= Kroksjö =

Kroksjö can mean:

- Kroksjö, Lycksele Municipality, Sweden
- Kroksjö, Umeå Municipality, Sweden
