= 2022 Rally Sweden =

69th edition of Rally Sweden

2022 Rally Sweden Swedish Rally 2022
Round 2 of 13 in the 2022 World Rally Championship
← Previous event	Next event →
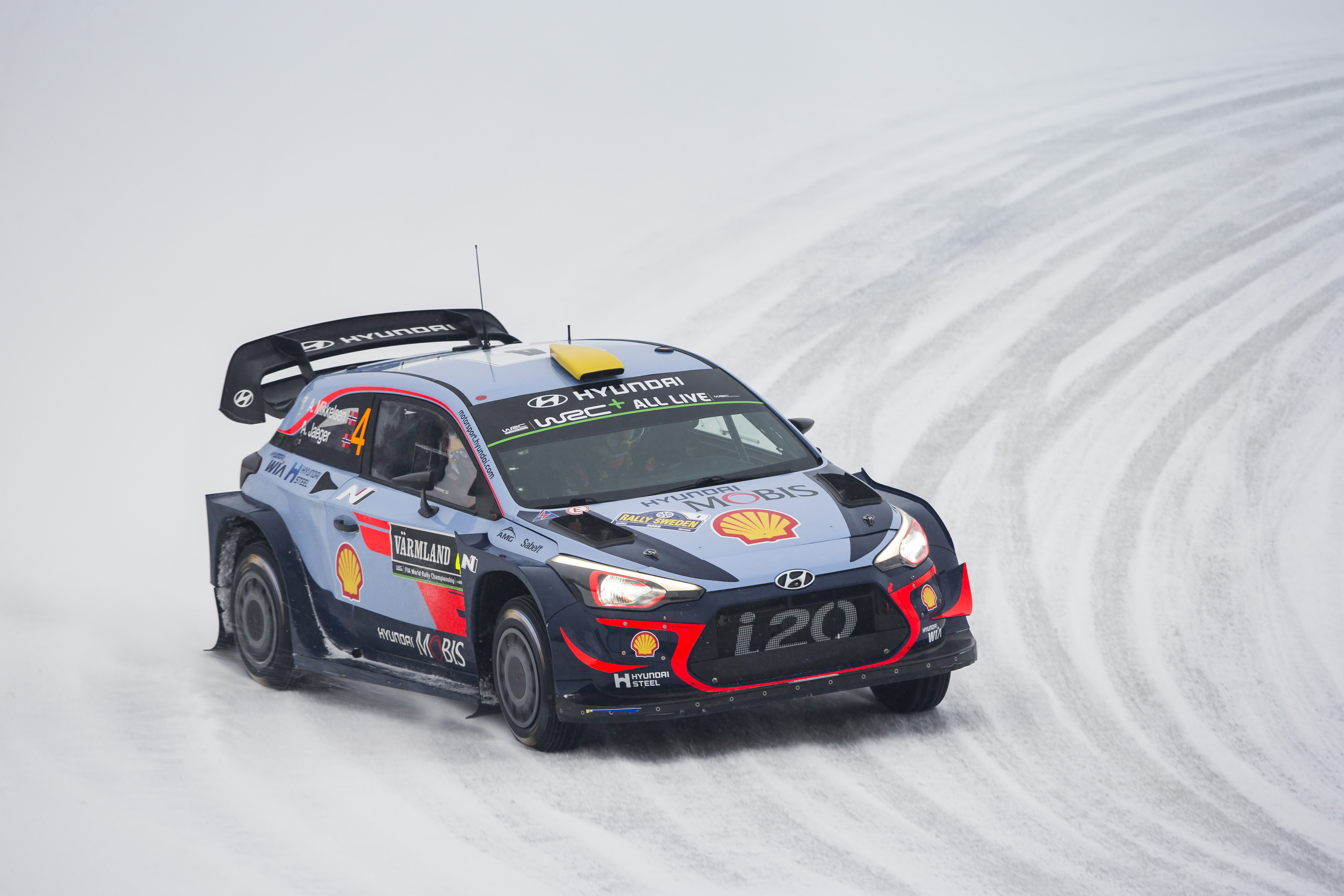
- Rally Sweden is the only snow event on the World Rally Championship calendar.
- Host country: Sweden
- Rally base: Umeå, Västerbotten County
- Dates run: 24 – 27 February 2022
- Start location: Kroksjö, Umeå Municipality
- Finish location: Sarsjöliden, Vindeln Municipality
- Stages: 17 (264.81 km; 164.55 miles)
- Stage surface: Snow
- Transport distance: 958.41 km (595.53 miles)
- Overall distance: 1,223.22 km (760.07 miles)

Statistics
- Crews registered: 50
- Crews: 45 at start, 36 at finish
- Cancellation: SS9 and SS13 cancelled due to reindeer movements.

Overall results
- Overall winner: (Finland) Kalle Rovanperä (Finland) Jonne Halttunen (Japan) Toyota Gazoo Racing WRT; 2:10:44.9
- Power Stage winner: (Estonia) Ott Tänak (Estonia) Martin Järveoja (South Korea) Hyundai Shell Mobis WRT; 6:29.8

Support category results
- WRC-2 winner: (Norway) Andreas Mikkelsen (Norway) Torstein Eriksen (Germany) Toksport WRT; 2:17:56.0
- WRC-3 winner: (Finland) Lauri Joona (Finland) Mikael Korhonen (Finland) Lauri Joona; 2:24:33.8
- J-WRC winner: (United Kingdom) Jon Armstrong (Republic of Ireland) Brian Hoy (United Kingdom) Jon Armstrong; 2:24:31.1

The 2022 Rally Sweden (also known as the Swedish Rally 2022) was a motor racing event for rally cars held over four days between 24 and 27 February 2022. It marked the 69th running of the Rally Sweden, and was the second round of the 2022 World Rally Championship, World Rally Championship-2 and World Rally Championship-3. The 2022 event was based in Umeå, in Västerbotten County. The rally was scheduled to cover a total competitive distance of 303.74 km (188.74 mi), but was shortened to 264.81 km (164.55 mi) prior to the start of the event due to unexpected reindeer movements in the Örträsk area.

Elfyn Evans and Scott Martin were the defending rally winners. Their team, Toyota Gazoo Racing WRT, were the defending manufacturers' winners. Mads Østberg and Torstein Eriksen were the defending rally winners in the WRC-2 category, while Jari Huttunen and Mikko Lukka were the defending rally winners in the WRC-3 category.

Kalle Rovanperä and Jonne Halttunen took their third WRC victory. Their team, Toyota Gazoo Racing WRT, successfully defended their title. Andreas Mikkelsen was the winner in the WRC-2 category and Eriksen successfully defended his title. The Finnish crew of Lauri Joona and Mikael Korhonen won the WRC-3 category, while Jon Armstrong and Brian Hoy won the junior class.

== Background ==
=== Entry list ===
The following crews are set to enter into the rally. The event will be opened to crews competing in the World Rally Championship, its support categories, the World Rally Championship-2 and World Rally Championship-3, and privateer entries that are not registered to score points in any championship. Eleven crews were entered under Rally1 regulations, as are twenty-four Rally2 crews in the World Rally Championship-2 and eight Rally3 crews in the World Rally Championship-3.

Rally1 entries competing in the World Rally Championship
No.	Driver	Co-Driver	Entrant	Car	Championship eligibility	Tyre
2	(Sweden) Oliver Solberg	(United Kingdom) Elliott Edmondson	(South Korea) Hyundai Shell Mobis WRT	Hyundai i20 N Rally1	Driver, Co-driver, Manufacturer	P
4	(Finland) Esapekka Lappi	(Finland) Janne Ferm	(Japan) Toyota Gazoo Racing WRT	Toyota GR Yaris Rally1	Driver, Co-driver, Manufacturer	P
8	(Estonia) Ott Tänak	(Estonia) Martin Järveoja	(South Korea) Hyundai Shell Mobis WRT	Hyundai i20 N Rally1	Driver, Co-driver, Manufacturer	P
11	(Belgium) Thierry Neuville	(Belgium) Martijn Wydaeghe	(South Korea) Hyundai Shell Mobis WRT	Hyundai i20 N Rally1	Driver, Co-driver, Manufacturer	P
16	(France) Adrien Fourmaux	(France) Alexandre Coria	(United Kingdom) M-Sport Ford WRT	Ford Puma Rally1	Driver, Co-driver, Manufacturer	P
18	(Japan) Takamoto Katsuta	(Republic of Ireland) Aaron Johnston	(Japan) Toyota Gazoo Racing WRT NG	Toyota GR Yaris Rally1	Driver, Co-driver, Manufacturer/Team	P
33	(United Kingdom) Elfyn Evans	(United Kingdom) Scott Martin	(Japan) Toyota Gazoo Racing WRT	Toyota GR Yaris Rally1	Driver, Co-driver, Manufacturer	P
37	(Italy) Lorenzo Bertelli	(Italy) Simone Scattolin	(United Kingdom) M-Sport Ford WRT	Ford Puma Rally1	Driver, Co-driver	—N/a
42	(Republic of Ireland) Craig Breen	(Republic of Ireland) Paul Nagle	(United Kingdom) M-Sport Ford WRT	Ford Puma Rally1	Driver, Co-driver, Manufacturer	P
44	(United Kingdom) Gus Greensmith	(Sweden) Jonas Andersson	(United Kingdom) M-Sport Ford WRT	Ford Puma Rally1	Driver, Co-driver, Manufacturer	P
69	(Finland) Kalle Rovanperä	(Finland) Jonne Halttunen	(Japan) Toyota Gazoo Racing WRT	Toyota GR Yaris Rally1	Driver, Co-driver, Manufacturer	P

Rally2 entries competing in the World Rally Championship-2
No.	Driver	Co-Driver	Entrant	Car	Championship eligibility	Tyre
20	(Norway) Andreas Mikkelsen	(Norway) Torstein Eriksen	(Germany) Toksport WRT	Škoda Fabia Rally2 evo	Driver, Co-driver, Team	P
21	Nikolay Gryazin (Note: Nikolay Gryazin is Russian, but he competes as a neutral competitor using the designation RAF (Russian Automobile Federation), as the Court of Arbitration for Sport upheld a ban on Russia competing at World Championships. The ban was implemented by the World Anti-Doping Agency in response to state-sponsored doping program of Russian athletes.)	Konstantin Aleksandrov (Note: Konstantin Aleksandrov is Russian, but he competes as a neutral competitor using the designation RAF (Russian Automobile Federation), as the Court of Arbitration for Sport upheld a ban on Russia competing at World Championships. The ban was implemented by the World Anti-Doping Agency in response to state-sponsored doping program of Russian athletes.)	(Germany) Toksport WRT 2	Škoda Fabia Rally2 evo	Junior Driver, Co-driver, Team	P
22	(Finland) Emil Lindholm	(Finland) Reeta Hämäläinen	(Germany) Toksport WRT 2	Škoda Fabia Rally2 evo	Junior Driver, Co-driver, Team	P
23	(Finland) Jari Huttunen	(Finland) Mikko Lukka	(United Kingdom) M-Sport Ford WRT	Ford Fiesta Rally2	Driver, Co-driver, Team	P
24	(Norway) Ole Christian Veiby	(Norway) Stig Rune Skjærmoen	(Norway) Ole Christian Veiby	Volkswagen Polo GTI R5	Driver, Co-driver	P
25	(Bolivia) Marco Bulacia	(Argentina) Marcelo Der Ohannesian	(Germany) Toksport WRT	Škoda Fabia Rally2 evo	Junior Driver, Co-driver, Team	P
26	(Sweden) Mattias Adielsson	(Sweden) David Arhusiander	(United Kingdom) M-Sport Ford WRT	Ford Fiesta Rally2	Driver, Co-driver, Team	P
27	(Finland) Eerik Pietarinen	(Finland) Antti Linnaketo	(Finland) Eerik Pietarinen	Volkswagen Polo GTI R5	Junior Driver, Co-driver	P
28	(Estonia) Egon Kaur	(Estonia) Silver Simm	(Estonia) Egon Kaur	Volkswagen Polo GTI R5	Driver, Co-driver	P
29	(Sweden) Per-Gunnar Andersson	(Sweden) Anders Fredriksson	(Sweden) Per-Gunnar Andersson	Ford Fiesta Rally2	Driver, Co-driver	P
30	(Sweden) Jörgen Jonasson	(Sweden) Nicklas Jonasson	(Sweden) Jörgen Jonasson	Škoda Fabia Rally2 evo	Driver, Co-driver	P
31	(Estonia) Georg Linnamäe	(United Kingdom) James Morgan	(Estonia) ALM Motorsport	Volkswagen Polo GTI R5	Junior Driver, Co-driver	P
32	(Republic of Ireland) Josh McErlean	(Republic of Ireland) James Fulton	(Republic of Ireland) Josh McErlean	Hyundai i20 N Rally2	Junior Driver, Junior Co-driver	P
34	(Saudi Arabia) Rakan Al-Rashed	(Portugal) Hugo Magalhães	(Saudi Arabia) Rakan Al-Rashed	Volkswagen Polo GTI R5	Driver, Co-driver	P
35	(Italy) Mauro Miele	(Italy) Luca Beltrame	(Italy) Mauro Miele	Škoda Fabia Rally2 evo	Masters Driver, Co-driver	P
36	(Poland) Jarosław Kołtun	(Poland) Ireneusz Pleskot	(Poland) Jarosław Kołtun	Ford Fiesta Rally2	Driver, Co-driver	P
38	(Poland) Michał Sołowow	(Poland) Maciej Baran	(Poland) Michał Sołowow	Volkswagen Polo GTI R5	Masters Driver, Co-driver	P
39	(Spain) Alexander Villanueva	(Spain) Rodrigo Sanjuan	(Spain) Alexander Villanueva	Citroën C3 Rally2	Masters Driver, Co-driver	P
40	(Bolivia) Bruno Bulacia	(Spain) Marc Martí	(Bolivia) Bruno Bulacia	Škoda Fabia Rally2 evo	Junior Driver, Co-driver	P
41	(United Kingdom) Kyle Tilley	(Republic of Ireland) Martin Brady	(United Kingdom) Kyle Tilley	Ford Fiesta Rally2	Driver, Co-driver	P
43	(Sweden) Joakim Roman	(Sweden) Jörgen Fornander	(Sweden) Joakim Roman	Škoda Fabia Rally2 evo	Masters Driver, Masters Co-driver	P
45	(Italy) Enrico Oldrati	(Italy) Elia De Guio	(Italy) Enrico Oldrati	Škoda Fabia Rally2 evo	Junior Driver, Junior Co-driver	P
46	(France) Frédéric Rosati	(Belgium) Stéphane Prévot	(France) Frédéric Rosati	Hyundai i20 N Rally2	Masters Driver, Masters Co-driver	P
47	(Republic of Ireland) Eamonn Boland	(Republic of Ireland) Michael Joseph Morrissey	(Republic of Ireland) Eamonn Boland	Ford Fiesta Rally2	Masters Driver, Masters Co-driver	P

Rally3 entries competing in the World Rally Championship-3
No.	Driver	Co-Driver	Entrant	Car	Championship eligibility	Tyre
48	(Finland) Sami Pajari	(Finland) Enni Mälkönen	(Finland) Sami Pajari	Ford Fiesta Rally3	Junior, Open	P
49	(Finland) Lauri Joona	(Finland) Mikael Korhonen	(Finland) Lauri Joona	Ford Fiesta Rally3	Junior, Open	P
50	(United Kingdom) Jon Armstrong	(Republic of Ireland) Brian Hoy	(United Kingdom) Jon Armstrong	Ford Fiesta Rally3	Junior	P
51	(Estonia) Robert Virves	(Estonia) Aleks Lesk	(Estonia) Starter Energy Racing	Ford Fiesta Rally3	Junior	P
52	(Republic of Ireland) William Creighton	(Republic of Ireland) Liam Regan	(Republic of Ireland) Motorsport Ireland Rally Academy	Ford Fiesta Rally3	Junior, Open	P
53	(France) Jean-Baptiste Franceschi	(France) Anthony Gorguilo	(France) Jean-Baptiste Franceschi	Ford Fiesta Rally3	Junior	—N/a
54	(Kenya) McRae Kimathi	(Kenya) Mwangi Kioni	(Kenya) McRae Kimathi	Ford Fiesta Rally3	Junior, Open	P
55	(Greece) Panagiotis Roustemis	(Greece) Christos Bakloris	(Greece) Panagiotis Roustemis	Ford Fiesta Rally3	Junior	—N/a

=== Itinerary ===
The rally was initially covered 303.74 km (188.7 mi) in nineteen special stages, but it was reduced to seventeen in a total of 264.81 km (164.5 mi) due to reindeer movements.

All dates and times are CET (UTC+1).

Date	Time	No.	Stage name	Distance
24 February	9:00	—	Klabböle [Shakedown]	6.80 km
25 February	8:42	SS1	Kroksjö 1	15.20 km
25 February	9:52	SS2	Kamsjön 1	24.88 km
25 February	11:29	SS3	Sävar 1	27.80 km
25 February	14:47	SS4	Kroksjö 2	17.24 km
25 February	15:57	SS5	Kamsjön 2	27.80 km
25 February	17:34	SS6	Sävar 2	17.24 km
25 February	18:38	SS7	Umeå Sprint	5.24 km
26 February	8:57	SS8	Brattby 1	10.49 km
26 February	~~9:29~~	~~SS9~~	~~Örträsk 1~~	~~20.52 km~~
26 February	10:54	SS10	Långed 1	19.44 km
26 February	12:08	SS11	Umeå 1	10.44 km
26 February	15:27	SS12	Brattby 2	10.49 km
26 February	~~15:59~~	~~SS13~~	~~Örträsk 2~~	~~20.52 km~~
26 February	17:24	SS14	Långed 2	19.44 km
26 February	18:38	SS15	Umeå 2	10.44 km
27 February	7:00	SS16	Vindeln 1	14.19 km
27 February	8:08	SS17	Sarsjöliden 1	13.93 km
27 February	9:36	SS18	Vindeln 2	14.19 km
27 February	12:18	SS19	Sarsjöliden 2 [Power Stage]	13.93 km

== Report ==
=== WRC Rally1 ===
==== Classification ====
Position		No.	Driver	Co-driver	Entrant	Car	Time	Difference	Points	
Event	Class	No.	Driver	Co-driver	Entrant	Car	Time	Difference	Event	Stage
1	1	69	Kalle Rovanperä	Jonne Halttunen	Toyota Gazoo Racing WRT	Toyota GR Yaris Rally1	2:10:44.9	0.0	25	4
2	2	11	Thierry Neuville	Martijn Wydaeghe	Hyundai Shell Mobis WRT	Hyundai i20 N Rally1	2:11:06.9	+22.0	18	3
3	3	4	Esapekka Lappi	Janne Ferm	Toyota Gazoo Racing WRT	Toyota GR Yaris Rally1	2:11:15.5	+30.6	15	0
4	4	18	Takamoto Katsuta	Aaron Johnston	Toyota Gazoo Racing WRT NG	Toyota GR Yaris Rally1	2:13:04.3	+2:19.4	12	2
5	5	44	Gus Greensmith	Jonas Andersson	M-Sport Ford WRT	Ford Puma Rally1	2:14:05.3	+3:20.4	10	0
6	6	2	Oliver Solberg	Elliott Edmondson	Hyundai Shell Mobis WRT	Hyundai i20 N Rally1	2:16:24.3	+5:39.4	8	0
20	7	8	Ott Tänak	Martin Järveoja	Hyundai Shell Mobis WRT	Hyundai i20 N Rally1	2:32:43.3	+21:58.4	0	5
36	8	42	Craig Breen	Paul Nagle	M-Sport Ford WRT	Ford Puma Rally1	3:32:41.2	+1:21:56.3	0	1
Retired SS16		33	Elfyn Evans	Scott Martin	Toyota Gazoo Racing WRT	Toyota GR Yaris Rally1	Crash		0	0
Retired SS15		16	Adrien Fourmaux	Alexandre Coria	M-Sport Ford WRT	Ford Puma Rally1	Mechanical		0	0
Did not start		37	Lorenzo Bertelli	Simone Scattolin	M-Sport Ford WRT	Ford Puma Rally1	Withdrawn		0	0

==== Special stages ====
Stage	Winners	Car	Time	Class leaders
SD	Rovanperä / Halttunen	Toyota GR Yaris Rally1	3:22.4	—N/a
SS1	Tänak / Järveoja	Hyundai i20 N Rally1	8:34.1	Tänak / Järveoja
SS2	Lappi / Ferm	Toyota GR Yaris Rally1	12:39.6	Lappi / Ferm
SS3	Rovanperä / Halttunen	Toyota GR Yaris Rally1	8:06.7	Rovanperä / Halttunen
SS4	Evans / Martin	Toyota GR Yaris Rally1	8:20.0	Evans / Martin
SS5	Tänak / Järveoja	Hyundai i20 N Rally1	12:31.0	Evans / Martin
SS6	Neuville / Wydaeghe	Hyundai i20 N Rally1	8:17.4	Evans / Martin
SS7	Rovanperä / Halttunen	Toyota GR Yaris Rally1	3:36.2	Neuville / Wydaeghe
SS8	Evans / Martin	Toyota GR Yaris Rally1	6:21.2	Rovanperä / Halttunen
SS10	Rovanperä / Halttunen	Toyota GR Yaris Rally1	8:51.6	Rovanperä / Halttunen
SS11	Breen / Nagle	Ford Puma Rally1	6:08.0	Rovanperä / Halttunen
SS12	Evans / Martin	Toyota GR Yaris Rally1	6:18.8	Rovanperä / Halttunen
SS14	Rovanperä / Halttunen	Toyota GR Yaris Rally1	8:53.7	Rovanperä / Halttunen
SS15	Rovanperä / Halttunen	Toyota GR Yaris Rally1	6:12.4	Rovanperä / Halttunen
SS16	Rovanperä / Halttunen	Toyota GR Yaris Rally1	6:03.0	Rovanperä / Halttunen
SS17	Tänak / Järveoja	Hyundai i20 N Rally1	6:35.0	Rovanperä / Halttunen
SS18	Neuville / Wydaeghe	Hyundai i20 N Rally1	6:02.1	Rovanperä / Halttunen
SS19	Tänak / Järveoja	Hyundai i20 N Rally1	6:29.8	Rovanperä / Halttunen

==== Championship standings ====
Pos.	Drivers' championships			Co-drivers' championships			Manufacturers' championships		
Pos.	Move	Driver	Points	Move	Co-driver	Points	Move	Manufacturer	Points
1	2	Kalle Rovanperä	46	2	Jonne Halttunen	46	1	Toyota Gazoo Racing WRT	83
2	3	Thierry Neuville	32	3	Martijn Wydaeghe	32	1	M-Sport Ford WRT	59
3	2	Sébastien Loeb	27	2	Isabelle Galmiche	27		Hyundai Shell Mobis WRT	47
4	2	Gus Greensmith	20	2	Jonas Andersson	20		Toyota Gazoo Racing WRT NG	22
5	3	Sébastien Ogier	19	3	Benjamin Veillas	19			

=== WRC-2 Rally2 ===
==== Classification ====
Position		No.	Driver	Co-driver	Entrant	Car	Time	Difference	Points		
Event	Class	No.	Driver	Co-driver	Entrant	Car	Time	Difference	Class	Stage	Event
7	1	20	Andreas Mikkelsen	Torstein Eriksen	Toksport WRT	Škoda Fabia Rally2 evo	2:17:56.0	0.0	25	0	6
8	2	24	Ole Christian Veiby	Stig Rune Skjærmoen	Ole Christian Veiby	Volkswagen Polo GTI R5	2:18:19.2	+23.2	18	0	4
9	3	23	Jari Huttunen	Mikko Lukka	M-Sport Ford WRT	Ford Fiesta Rally2	2:18:59.1	+1:03.1	15	0	2
10	4	28	Egon Kaur	Silver Simm	Egon Kaur	Volkswagen Polo GTI R5	2:19:09.7	+1:13.7	12	0	1
11	5	31	Georg Linnamäe	James Morgan	ALM Motorsport	Volkswagen Polo GTI R5	2:19:20.9	+1:24.9	10	2	0
12	6	27	Eerik Pietarinen	Antti Linnaketo	Eerik Pietarinen	Volkswagen Polo GTI R5	2:19:38.7	+1:42.7	8	1	0
13	7	30	Jörgen Jonasson	Nicklas Jonasson	Jörgen Jonasson	Škoda Fabia Rally2 evo	2:23:59.7	+6:03.7	6	0	0
16	8	38	Michał Sołowow	Maciej Baran	Michał Sołowow	Volkswagen Polo GTI R5	2:25:24.3	+7:28.3	4	0	0
19	9	40	Bruno Bulacia	Marc Martí	Bruno Bulacia	Škoda Fabia Rally2 evo	2:30:33.2	+12:37.2	2	0	0
23	10	35	Mauro Miele	Luca Beltrame	Mauro Miele	Škoda Fabia Rally2 evo	2:36:17.7	+18:21.7	1	0	0
25	11	43	Joakim Roman	Jörgen Fornander	Joakim Roman	Škoda Fabia Rally2 evo	2:38:40.1	+20:44.1	0	0	0
26	12	45	Enrico Oldrati	Elia De Guio	Enrico Oldrati	Škoda Fabia Rally2 evo	2:40:05.6	+22:09.6	0	0	0
29	13	32	Josh McErlean	James Fulton	Josh McErlean	Hyundai i20 N Rally2	2:52:04.1	+34:08.1	0	0	0
32	14	22	Emil Lindholm	Reeta Hämäläinen	Toksport WRT 2	Škoda Fabia Rally2 evo	3:18:02.4	+1:00:06.4	0	3	0
33	15	25	Marco Bulacia	Marcelo Der Ohannesian	Toksport WRT	Škoda Fabia Rally2 evo	3:21:47.5	+1:03:51.5	0	0	0
35	16	47	Eamonn Boland	Michael Joseph Morrissey	Eamonn Boland	Ford Fiesta Rally2	3:26:15.4	+1:08:19.4	0	0	0
Retired SS19		39	Alexander Villanueva	Rodrigo Sanjuan	Alexander Villanueva	Citroën C3 Rally2	Withdrawn		0	0	0
Retired SS18		21	Nikolay Gryazin	Konstantin Aleksandrov	Toksport WRT 2	Škoda Fabia Rally2 evo	Off-road		0	0	0
Retired SS18		34	Rakan Al-Rashed	Hugo Magalhães	Rakan Al-Rashed	Volkswagen Polo GTI R5	Crash		0	0	0
Retired SS17		26	Mattias Adielsson	David Arhusiander	M-Sport Ford WRT	Ford Fiesta Rally2	Mechanical		0	0	0
Retired SS17		46	Frédéric Rosati	Stéphane Prévot	Frédéric Rosati	Hyundai i20 N Rally2	Mechanical		0	0	0
Retired SS15		29	Per-Gunnar Andersson	Anders Fredriksson	Per-Gunnar Andersson	Ford Fiesta Rally2	Off-road		0	0	0

==== Special stages ====
Stage	Open Championship				Junior Championship				Masters Cup			
Stage	Winners	Car	Time	Class leaders	Winners	Car	Time	Class leaders	Winners	Car	Time	Class leaders
SD	Gryazin / Aleksandrov	Škoda Fabia Rally2 evo	3:33.4	—N/a	Gryazin / Aleksandrov	Škoda Fabia Rally2 evo	3:33.4	—N/a	Sołowow / Baran	Volkswagen Polo GTI R5	3:51.5	—N/a
SS1	Huttunen / Lukka	Ford Fiesta Rally2	8:55.2	Huttunen / Lukka	Pietarinen / Linnaketo	Volkswagen Polo GTI R5	8:58.1	Pietarinen / Linnaketo	Sołowow / Baran	Volkswagen Polo GTI R5	9:30.0	Sołowow / Baran
SS2	Veiby / Skjærmoen	Volkswagen Polo GTI R5	13:18.3	Veiby / Skjærmoen	Linnamäe / Morgan	Volkswagen Polo GTI R5	13:22.6	Gryazin / Aleksandrov	Sołowow / Baran	Volkswagen Polo GTI R5	13:42.2	Sołowow / Baran
SS3	Veiby / Skjærmoen	Volkswagen Polo GTI R5	8:38.5	Veiby / Skjærmoen	Linnamäe / Morgan	Volkswagen Polo GTI R5	8:41.2	Linnamäe / Morgan	Sołowow / Baran	Volkswagen Polo GTI R5	9:00.7	Sołowow / Baran
SS4	Veiby / Skjærmoen	Volkswagen Polo GTI R5	8:40.2	Veiby / Skjærmoen	Gryazin / Aleksandrov	Škoda Fabia Rally2 evo	8:43.2	Linnamäe / Morgan	Sołowow / Baran	Volkswagen Polo GTI R5	9:06.6	Sołowow / Baran
SS5	Mikkelsen / Eriksen	Škoda Fabia Rally2 evo	13:11.4	Veiby / Skjærmoen	Gryazin / Aleksandrov	Škoda Fabia Rally2 evo	13:15.1	Linnamäe / Morgan	Sołowow / Baran	Volkswagen Polo GTI R5	13:41.0	Sołowow / Baran
SS6	Huttunen / Lukka	Ford Fiesta Rally2	8:43.2	Veiby / Skjærmoen	Gryazin / Aleksandrov	Škoda Fabia Rally2 evo	8:48.9	Gryazin / Aleksandrov	Sołowow / Baran	Volkswagen Polo GTI R5	9:49.2	Sołowow / Baran
SS7	Huttunen / Lukka	Ford Fiesta Rally2	3:47.6	Mikkelsen / Eriksen	Gryazin / Aleksandrov	Škoda Fabia Rally2 evo	3:53.8	Gryazin / Aleksandrov	Sołowow / Baran	Volkswagen Polo GTI R5	4:00.5	Sołowow / Baran
SS8	Mikkelsen / Eriksen	Škoda Fabia Rally2 evo	6:43.7	Mikkelsen / Eriksen	Lindholm / Hämäläinen	Škoda Fabia Rally2 evo	6:47.9	Linnamäe / Morgan	Sołowow / Baran	Volkswagen Polo GTI R5	7:18.4	Sołowow / Baran
SS10	Veiby / Skjærmoen	Volkswagen Polo GTI R5	9:21.7	Veiby / Skjærmoen	Lindholm / Hämäläinen	Škoda Fabia Rally2 evo	9:30.5	Gryazin / Aleksandrov	Sołowow / Baran	Volkswagen Polo GTI R5	9:57.7	Sołowow / Baran
SS11	Mikkelsen / Eriksen	Škoda Fabia Rally2 evo	6:24.6	Mikkelsen / Eriksen	Gryazin / Aleksandrov	Škoda Fabia Rally2 evo	6:26.5	Gryazin / Aleksandrov	Villanueva / Sanjuan	Citroën C3 Rally2	6:52.8	Sołowow / Baran
SS12	Huttunen / Lukka	Ford Fiesta Rally2	6:37.3	Mikkelsen / Eriksen	Gryazin / Aleksandrov	Škoda Fabia Rally2 evo	6:41.0	Gryazin / Aleksandrov	Sołowow / Baran	Volkswagen Polo GTI R5	7:17.4	Sołowow / Baran
SS14	Gryazin / Aleksandrov	Škoda Fabia Rally2 evo	9:32.9	Mikkelsen / Eriksen	Gryazin / Aleksandrov	Škoda Fabia Rally2 evo	9:32.9	Gryazin / Aleksandrov	Sołowow / Baran	Volkswagen Polo GTI R5	10:26.7	Sołowow / Baran
SS15	Lindholm / Hämäläinen	Škoda Fabia Rally2 evo	6:30.5	Mikkelsen / Eriksen	Lindholm / Hämäläinen	Škoda Fabia Rally2 evo	6:30.5	Gryazin / Aleksandrov	Sołowow / Baran	Volkswagen Polo GTI R5	6:56.1	Sołowow / Baran
SS16	Veiby / Skjærmoen	Volkswagen Polo GTI R5	6:27.2	Mikkelsen / Eriksen	Pietarinen / Linnaketo	Volkswagen Polo GTI R5	6:31.4	Gryazin / Aleksandrov	Sołowow / Baran	Volkswagen Polo GTI R5	6:49.5	Sołowow / Baran
SS17	Veiby / Skjærmoen	Volkswagen Polo GTI R5	6:27.2	Mikkelsen / Eriksen	Lindholm / Hämäläinen	Škoda Fabia Rally2 evo	7:00.6	Gryazin / Aleksandrov	Sołowow / Baran	Volkswagen Polo GTI R5	7:17.9	Sołowow / Baran
SS18	Mikkelsen / Eriksen	Škoda Fabia Rally2 evo	6:24.3	Mikkelsen / Eriksen	Lindholm / Hämäläinen	Škoda Fabia Rally2 evo	6:27.9	Linnamäe / Morgan	Sołowow / Baran	Volkswagen Polo GTI R5	6:40.7	Sołowow / Baran
SS19	Lindholm / Hämäläinen	Škoda Fabia Rally2 evo	6:54.4	Mikkelsen / Eriksen	Lindholm / Hämäläinen	Škoda Fabia Rally2 evo	6:54.4	Linnamäe / Morgan	Sołowow / Baran	Volkswagen Polo GTI R5	7:16.4	Sołowow / Baran

==== Championship standings ====
Pos.	Open Drivers' championships			Open Co-drivers' championships			Teams' championships			Junior Drivers' championships			Junior Co-drivers' championships			Driver Masters' championships			Co-driver Masters' championships		
Pos.	Move	Driver	Points	Move	Co-driver	Points	Move	Manufacturer	Points	Move	Manufacturer	Points	Move	Driver	Points	Move	Driver	Points	Move	Driver	Points
1		Andreas Mikkelsen	51		Torstein Eriksen	51	1	Toksport WRT	62		Erik Cais	25		Louis Louka	25		Mauro Miele	43	1	Michael Joseph Morrissey	36
2		Erik Cais	18		Petr Těšínský	18	1	Yaco ACCR Team	30	New entry	Georg Linnamäe	25	New entry	Elia De Guio	25	New entry	Michał Sołowow	25	1	Laurent Magat	25
3	New entry	Ole Christian Veiby	18	New entry	Stig Rune Skjærmoen	18	New entry	M-Sport Ford WRT	18	1	Nikolay Gryazin	18	New entry	James Fulton	18	2	Eamonn Boland	22	New entry	Jörgen Fornander	25
4	1	Nikolay Gryazin	15	1	Konstantin Aleksandrov	15	1	Saintéloc Junior Team	15	New entry	Eerik Pietarinen	18				2	Olivier Burri	18	1	Philippe Marchetto	15
5	New entry	Jari Huttunen	15	New entry	Mikko Lukka	15	New entry	Toksport WRT 2	15	1	Grégoire Munster	15				2	Freddy Loix	15	1	Michela Lorigiola	12

=== WRC-3 Rally3 ===
==== Classification ====
Position		No.	Driver	Co-driver	Entrant	Car	Time	Difference	Points		
Event	Class	No.	Driver	Co-driver	Entrant	Car	Time	Difference	Open	Junior	Stage
14	1	50	Jon Armstrong	Brian Hoy	Jon Armstrong	Ford Fiesta Rally3	2:24:31.1	0.0	—N/a	25	5
15	2	49	Lauri Joona	Mikael Korhonen	Lauri Joona	Ford Fiesta Rally3	2:24:33.8	+2.7	25	18	3
17	3	52	William Creighton	Liam Regan	Motorsport Ireland Rally Academy	Ford Fiesta Rally3	2:26:53.6	+2:22.5	18	15	1
30	4	54	McRae Kimathi	Mwangi Kioni	McRae Kimathi	Ford Fiesta Rally3	3:11:55.3	+47:24.2	15	12	0
31	5	48	Sami Pajari	Enni Mälkönen	Sami Pajari	Ford Fiesta Rally3	3:13:59.5	+49:28.4	12	10	7
34	6	51	Robert Virves	Aleks Lesk	Starter Energy Racing	Ford Fiesta Rally3	3:25:05.4	+1:00:34.3	—N/a	8	0
Did not start		53	Jean-Baptiste Franceschi	Anthony Gorguilo	Jean-Baptiste Franceschi	Ford Fiesta Rally3	Withdrawn		—N/a	0	0
Did not start		55	Panagiotis Roustemis	Christos Bakloris	Panagiotis Roustemis	Ford Fiesta Rally3	Withdrawn		—N/a	0	0

==== Special stages ====
Stage	Open Championship				Junior Championship			
Stage	Winners	Car	Time	Class leaders	Winners	Car	Time	Class leaders
SD	Creighton / Regan	Ford Fiesta Rally3	3:51.9	—N/a	Armstrong / Hoy	Ford Fiesta Rally3	3:47.4	—N/a
SS1	Pajari / Mälkönen	Ford Fiesta Rally3	9:16.7	Pajari / Mälkönen	Virves / Lesk; Pajari / Mälkönen	Ford Fiesta Rally3	9:16.7	Virves / Lesk; Pajari / Mälkönen
SS2	Pajari / Mälkönen	Ford Fiesta Rally3	13:49.8	Pajari / Mälkönen	Pajari / Mälkönen	Ford Fiesta Rally3	13:49.8	Pajari / Mälkönen
SS3	Joona / Korhonen	Ford Fiesta Rally3	9:08.3	Joona / Korhonen	Armstrong / Hoy	Ford Fiesta Rally3	9:06.7	Joona / Korhonen
SS4	Joona / Korhonen	Ford Fiesta Rally3	9:01.9	Joona / Korhonen	Armstrong / Hoy	Ford Fiesta Rally3	8:58.5	Joona / Korhonen
SS5	Joona / Korhonen	Ford Fiesta Rally3	13:52.2	Joona / Korhonen	Joona / Korhonen	Ford Fiesta Rally3	13:52.2	Joona / Korhonen
SS6	Joona / Korhonen	Ford Fiesta Rally3	9:10.8	Joona / Korhonen	Joona / Korhonen	Ford Fiesta Rally3	9:10.8	Joona / Korhonen
SS7	Creighton / Regan	Ford Fiesta Rally3	3:58.8	Joona / Korhonen	Creighton / Regan	Ford Fiesta Rally3	3:58.8	Joona / Korhonen
SS8	Pajari / Mälkönen	Ford Fiesta Rally3	7:00.7	Joona / Korhonen	Pajari / Mälkönen	Ford Fiesta Rally3	7:00.7	Armstrong / Hoy
SS10	Pajari / Mälkönen	Ford Fiesta Rally3	7:00.7	Joona / Korhonen	Pajari / Mälkönen	Ford Fiesta Rally3	7:00.7	Joona / Korhonen
SS11	Pajari / Mälkönen	Ford Fiesta Rally3	6:45.5	Joona / Korhonen	Pajari / Mälkönen	Ford Fiesta Rally3	6:45.5	Joona / Korhonen
SS12	Pajari / Mälkönen	Ford Fiesta Rally3	6:51.7	Joona / Korhonen	Pajari / Mälkönen	Ford Fiesta Rally3	6:51.7	Joona / Korhonen
SS14	Pajari / Mälkönen	Ford Fiesta Rally3	9:54.7	Joona / Korhonen	Pajari / Mälkönen	Ford Fiesta Rally3	9:54.7	Joona / Korhonen
SS15	Pajari / Mälkönen	Ford Fiesta Rally3	6:51.2	Joona / Korhonen	Armstrong / Hoy	Ford Fiesta Rally3	6:47.0	Armstrong / Hoy
SS16	Joona / Korhonen	Ford Fiesta Rally3	6:48.8	Joona / Korhonen	Joona / Korhonen	Ford Fiesta Rally3	6:52.8	Joona / Korhonen
SS17	Joona / Korhonen	Ford Fiesta Rally3	7:22.0	Joona / Korhonen	Armstrong / Hoy	Ford Fiesta Rally3	7:21.0	Armstrong / Hoy
SS18	Joona / Korhonen	Ford Fiesta Rally3	6:47.7	Joona / Korhonen	Armstrong / Hoy	Ford Fiesta Rally3	6:45.2	Armstrong / Hoy
SS19	Pajari / Mälkönen	Ford Fiesta Rally3	7:18.3	Joona / Korhonen	Pajari / Mälkönen	Ford Fiesta Rally3	7:18.3	Armstrong / Hoy

==== Championship standings ====
Pos.	Open Drivers' championships			Open Co-drivers' championships			Junior Drivers' championships			Junior Co-drivers' championships		
Pos.	Move	Driver	Points	Move	Co-driver	Points	Move	Manufacturer	Points	Move	Manufacturer	Points
1		Sami Pajari	37		Enni Mälkönen	37	New entry	Jon Armstrong	30	New entry	Brian Hoy	30
2	New entry	Lauri Joona	25	New entry	Mikael Korhonen	25	New entry	Lauri Joona	21	New entry	Mikael Korhonen	21
3	1	Jan Černý	18	1	Petr Černohorský	18	New entry	Sami Pajari	17	New entry	Enni Mälkönen	17
4	New entry	William Creighton	18	New entry	Liam Regan	18	New entry	William Creighton	16	New entry	Liam Regan	16
5	2	Enrico Brazzoli	15	2	Manuel Fenoli	15	New entry	McRae Kimathi	12	New entry	Mwangi Kioni	12

== Notes ==
Previous rally: 2022 Monte Carlo Rally	2022 FIA World Rally Championship	Next rally: 2022 Croatia Rally
Previous rally: 2020 Rally Sweden; 2021 edition cancelled	2022 Rally Sweden	Next rally: 2023 Rally Sweden
