= 2022 Rally Estonia =

12th edition of Rally Estonia

2022 Rally Estonia Rally Estonia 2022
Round 7 of 13 in the 2022 World Rally Championship
← Previous event	Next event →
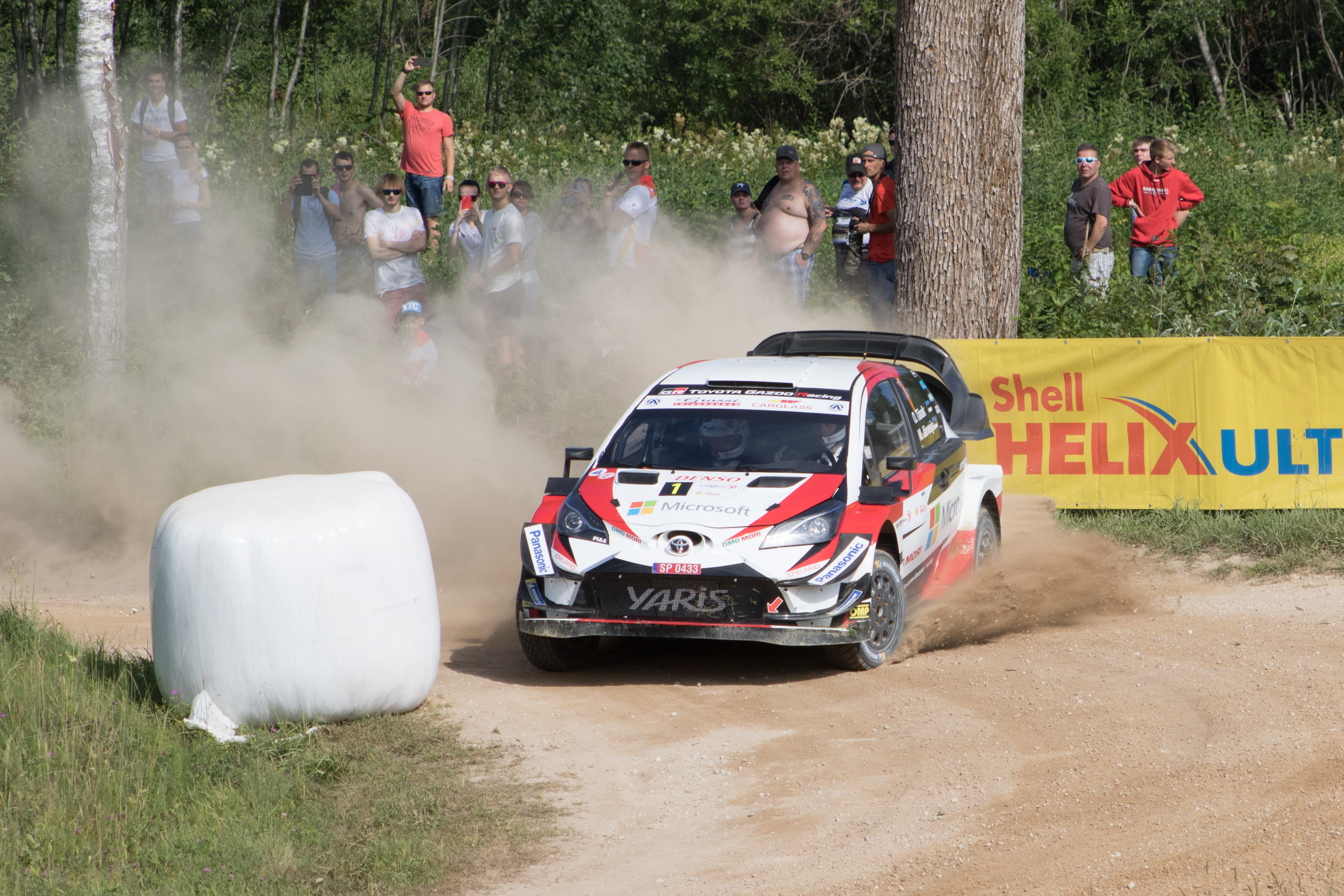
- Rally Estonia was the biggest motorsport event in the Baltic states.
- Host country: Estonia
- Rally base: Tartu, Tartu County
- Dates run: 14 – 17 July 2022
- Start location: Tartu, Tartu County
- Finish location: Leigo Lakes
- Stages: 24 (313.84 km; 195.01 miles)
- Stage surface: Gravel
- Transport distance: 1,172.93 km (728.82 miles)
- Overall distance: 1,486.77 km (923.84 miles)

Statistics
- Crews registered: 43
- Crews: 42 at start, 33 at finish

Overall results
- Overall winner: (Finland) Kalle Rovanperä (Finland) Jonne Halttunen (Japan) Toyota Gazoo Racing WRT; 2:54:29.0
- Power Stage winner: (Finland) Kalle Rovanperä (Finland) Jonne Halttunen (Japan) Toyota Gazoo Racing WRT; 9:18.2

Support category results
- WRC-2 winner: (Norway) Andreas Mikkelsen (Norway) Torstein Eriksen (Germany) Toksport WRT; 3:05:30.8
- WRC-3 winner: (Finland) Sami Pajari (Finland) Enni Mälkönen; 3:13:58.6
- J-WRC winner: (Finland) Sami Pajari (Finland) Enni Mälkönen; 3:13:58.6

The 2022 Rally Estonia was a motor racing event for rally cars held over four days between 14 and 17 July 2022. It marked the twelfth running of the Rally Estonia. The event was the seventh round of the 2022 World Rally Championship, World Rally Championship-2 and World Rally Championship-3. The 2022 event was based in Tartu of Tartu County and was contested over 24 special stages covering a total competitive distance of 313.84 km (195.01 mi).

Kalle Rovanperä and Jonne Halttunen were the defending rally winners. Their team, Toyota Gazoo Racing WRT, were the defending manufacturers' winners. Andreas Mikkelsen and Ola Fløene were the defending rally winners in the WRC-2 category. Aleksey Lukyanuk and Yaroslav Fedorov were the defending rally winners in the WRC-3 category. In the junior category, Sami Pajari and Marko Salminen were the defending winners.

Rovanperä and Halttunen successfully defended their titles, so as their team, Toyota Gazoo Racing WRT. Mikkelsen and Torstein Eriksen won the World Rally Championship-2 category. Pajari and Enni Mälkönen won the World Rally Championship-3 category as well as the junior class.

== Background ==
=== Entry list ===
The following crews entered into the rally. The event was opened to crews competing in the World Rally Championship, its support categories, the World Rally Championship-2 and World Rally Championship-3, and privateer entries that were not registered to score points in any championship. Eleven were entered under Rally1 regulations, as were nineteen Rally2 crews in the World Rally Championship-2 and seven Rally3 crews in the World Rally Championship-3.

Rally1 entries competing in the World Rally Championship
No.	Driver	Co-Driver	Entrant	Car	Championship eligibility	Tyre
2	(Sweden) Oliver Solberg	(United Kingdom) Elliott Edmondson	(South Korea) Hyundai Shell Mobis WRT	Hyundai i20 N Rally1	Driver, Co-driver, Manufacturer	P
4	(Finland) Esapekka Lappi	(Finland) Janne Ferm	(Japan) Toyota Gazoo Racing WRT	Toyota GR Yaris Rally1	Driver, Co-driver, Manufacturer	P
7	(France) Pierre-Louis Loubet	(France) Vincent Landais	(United Kingdom) M-Sport Ford WRT	Ford Puma Rally1	Driver, Co-driver	P
8	(Estonia) Ott Tänak	(Estonia) Martin Järveoja	(South Korea) Hyundai Shell Mobis WRT	Hyundai i20 N Rally1	Driver, Co-driver, Manufacturer	P
11	(Belgium) Thierry Neuville	(Belgium) Martijn Wydaeghe	(South Korea) Hyundai Shell Mobis WRT	Hyundai i20 N Rally1	Driver, Co-driver, Manufacturer	P
16	(France) Adrien Fourmaux	(France) Alexandre Coria	(United Kingdom) M-Sport Ford WRT	Ford Puma Rally1	Driver, Co-driver, Manufacturer	P
18	(Japan) Takamoto Katsuta	(Republic of Ireland) Aaron Johnston	(Japan) Toyota Gazoo Racing WRT NG	Toyota GR Yaris Rally1	Driver, Co-driver, Manufacturer/Team	P
33	(United Kingdom) Elfyn Evans	(United Kingdom) Scott Martin	(Japan) Toyota Gazoo Racing WRT	Toyota GR Yaris Rally1	Driver, Co-driver, Manufacturer	P
42	(Republic of Ireland) Craig Breen	(Republic of Ireland) Paul Nagle	(United Kingdom) M-Sport Ford WRT	Ford Puma Rally1	Driver, Co-driver, Manufacturer	P
44	(United Kingdom) Gus Greensmith	(Sweden) Jonas Andersson	(United Kingdom) M-Sport Ford WRT	Ford Puma Rally1	Driver, Co-driver, Manufacturer	P
69	(Finland) Kalle Rovanperä	(Finland) Jonne Halttunen	(Japan) Toyota Gazoo Racing WRT	Toyota GR Yaris Rally1	Driver, Co-driver, Manufacturer	P

Rally2 entries competing in the World Rally Championship-2
No.	Driver	Co-Driver	Entrant	Car	Championship eligibility	Tyre
20	(Finland) Teemu Suninen	(Finland) Mikko Markkula	(South Korea) Hyundai Motorsport N	Hyundai i20 N Rally2	Driver, Co-driver, Team	P
21	(Norway) Andreas Mikkelsen	(Norway) Torstein Eriksen	(Germany) Toksport WRT	Škoda Fabia Rally2 evo	Driver, Co-driver, Team	P
22	(Estonia) Egon Kaur	(Estonia) Silver Simm	(Estonia) Egon Kaur	Volkswagen Polo GTI R5	Driver, Co-driver	P
23	(New Zealand) Hayden Paddon	(New Zealand) John Kennard	(New Zealand) Hayden Paddon	Hyundai i20 N Rally2	Driver, Co-driver	P
24	(Estonia) Georg Linnamäe	(United Kingdom) Craig Drew	(Estonia) ALM Motorsport	Volkswagen Polo GTI R5	Junior Driver, Co-driver	P
25	(Poland) Kajetan Kajetanowicz	(Poland) Maciej Szczepaniak	(Poland) Kajetan Kajetanowicz	Škoda Fabia Rally2 evo	Driver, Co-driver	P
26	(Bolivia) Marco Bulacia	(Spain) Diego Vallejo	(Germany) Toksport WRT	Škoda Fabia Rally2 evo	Junior Driver, Co-driver, Team	P
27	(Finland) Emil Lindholm	(Finland) Reeta Hämäläinen	(Germany) Toksport WRT 2	Škoda Fabia Rally2 evo	Junior Driver, Co-driver, Team	P
28	Nikolay Gryazin (Note: Nikolay Gryazin is Russian, but he competes as a neutral competitor using the ANA flag as Russian national emblems were banned by the association due to the Russian invasion of Ukraine.)	Konstantin Aleksandrov (Note: Konstantin Aleksandrov is Russian, but he competes as a neutral competitor using the ANA flag as Russian national emblems were banned by the association due to the Russian invasion of Ukraine.)	(Germany) Toksport WRT 2	Škoda Fabia Rally2 evo	Junior Driver, Co-driver, Team	—N/a
29	(Finland) Jari Huttunen	(Finland) Mikko Lukka	(United Kingdom) M-Sport Ford WRT	Ford Fiesta Rally2	Driver, Co-driver	P
30	(Poland) Mikołaj Marczyk	(Poland) Szymon Gospodarczyk	(Poland) Mikołaj Marczyk	Škoda Fabia Rally2 evo	Junior Driver, Co-driver	P
31	(Chile) Emilio Fernández	(Spain) Axel Coronado	(Chile) Emilio Fernández	Škoda Fabia Rally2 evo	Driver, Co-driver	P
32	(United States) Sean Johnston	(United States) Alexander Kihurani	(France) Saintéloc Junior Team	Citroën C3 Rally2	Driver, Co-driver	P
34	(Paraguay) Fabrizio Zaldivar	(Argentina) Marcelo Der Ohannesian	(South Korea) Hyundai Motorsport N	Hyundai i20 N Rally2	Junior Driver, Co-driver, Team	P
35	(Estonia) Priit Koik	(Estonia) Kristo Tamm	(Estonia) Priit Koik	Ford Fiesta Rally2	Driver, Co-driver	P
36	(Estonia) Gregor Jeets	(Estonia) Timo Taniel	(Estonia) Gregor Jeets	Škoda Fabia Rally2 evo	Junior Driver, Co-driver	P
37	(Bolivia) Bruno Bulacia	(Spain) Marc Martí	(Bolivia) Bruno Bulacia	Škoda Fabia Rally2 evo	Junior Driver, Co-driver	P
38	(Republic of Ireland) Josh McErlean	(Republic of Ireland) James Fulton	(Republic of Ireland) Josh McErlean	Hyundai i20 N Rally2	Junior Driver, Co-driver	P
39	(Italy) Mauro Miele	(Italy) Luca Beltrame	(Italy) Mauro Miele	Škoda Fabia Rally2 evo	Masters Drivers, Co-driver	P
40	(Australia) Luke Anear	(Australia) Andrew Sarandis	(Australia) Luke Anear	Ford Fiesta Rally2	Driver, Co-driver	P

Rally3 entries competing in the World Rally Championship-3
No.	Driver	Co-Driver	Entrant	Car	Championship eligibility	Tyre
41	(United Kingdom) Jon Armstrong	(Republic of Ireland) Brian Hoy	(United Kingdom) Jon Armstrong	Ford Fiesta Rally3	Junior	P
43	(Finland) Lauri Joona	(Finland) Mikael Korhonen	(Finland) Lauri Joona	Ford Fiesta Rally3	Open, Junior	P
45	(Finland) Sami Pajari	(Finland) Enni Mälkönen	(Finland) Sami Pajari	Ford Fiesta Rally3	Open, Junior	P
46	(Estonia) Robert Virves	(Sweden) Julia Thulin	(Estonia) Starter Energy Racing	Ford Fiesta Rally3	Junior	P
47	(Republic of Ireland) William Creighton	(Republic of Ireland) Liam Regan	(Republic of Ireland) Motorsport Ireland Rally Academy	Ford Fiesta Rally3	Open, Junior	P
48	(Finland) Roope Korhonen	(Finland) Anssi Viinikka	(Finland) Roope Korhonen	Ford Fiesta Rally3	Open	P
49	(Kenya) McRae Kimathi	(Kenya) Mwangi Kioni	(Kenya) McRae Kimathi	Ford Fiesta Rally3	Open, Junior	P

=== Itinerary ===
All dates and times are EEST (UTC+3).

Date	Time	No.	Stage name	Distance
14 July	9:01	—	Abissaare [Shakedown]	6.23 km
14 July	20:38	SS1	Visit Estonia Tartu 1	1.66 km
15 July	7:45	SS2	Peipsiääre 1	24.35 km
15 July	8:43	SS3	Mustvee 1	17.09 km
15 July	10:26	SS4	Raanitsa 1	21.45 km
15 July	11:29	SS5	Vastsemõisa 1	6.70 km
15 July	15:16	SS6	Peipsiääre 2	24.35 km
15 July	16:14	SS7	Mustvee 2	17.09 km
15 July	17:57	SS8	Raanitsa 2	21.45 km
15 July	19:00	SS9	Vastsemõisa 2	6.70 km
16 July	9:03	SS10	Elva 1	11.73 km
16 July	10:16	SS11	Mäeküla 1	10.27 km
16 July	11:08	SS12	Otepää 1	17.08 km
16 July	12:02	SS13	Neeruti 1	7.60 km
16 July	15:08	SS14	Elva 2	11.73 km
16 July	16:16	SS15	Mäeküla 2	10.27 km
16 July	17:08	SS16	Otepää 2	17.08 km
16 July	18:02	SS17	Neeruti 2	7.60 km
16 July	19:08	SS18	Toyota Tartu 2	1.66 km
17 July	6:48	SS19	Tartu Vald 1	6.56 km
17 July	8:16	SS20	Kanepi 1	16.48 km
17 July	9:08	SS21	Kambja 1	15.95 km
17 July	11:00	SS22	Tartu Vald 2	6.56 km
17 July	12:28	SS23	Kanepi 2	16.48 km
17 July	14:18	SS24	Kambja 2 [Power Stage]	15.95 km

== Report ==
=== WRC Rally1 ===
==== Classification ====
Position		No.	Driver	Co-driver	Entrant	Car	Time	Difference	Points	
Event	Class	No.	Driver	Co-driver	Entrant	Car	Time	Difference	Event	Stage
1	1	69	Kalle Rovanperä	Jonne Halttunen	Toyota Gazoo Racing WRT	Toyota GR Yaris Rally1	2:54:29.0	0.0	25	5
2	2	33	Elfyn Evans	Scott Martin	Toyota Gazoo Racing WRT	Toyota GR Yaris Rally1	2:55:29.0	+1:00.9	18	4
3	3	8	Ott Tänak	Martin Järveoja	Hyundai Shell Mobis WRT	Hyundai i20 N Rally1	2:56:24.7	+1:55.7	15	0
4	4	11	Thierry Neuville	Martijn Wydaeghe	Hyundai Shell Mobis WRT	Hyundai i20 N Rally1	2:58:22.3	+3:53.3	12	0
5	5	18	Takamoto Katsuta	Aaron Johnston	Toyota Gazoo Racing WRT NG	Toyota GR Yaris Rally1	2:58:42.4	+4:13.4	10	1
6	6	4	Esapekka Lappi	Janne Ferm	Toyota Gazoo Racing WRT	Toyota GR Yaris Rally1	2:59:18.1	+4:49.1	8	2
7	7	16	Adrien Fourmaux	Alexandre Coria	M-Sport Ford WRT	Ford Puma Rally1	2:59:38.2	+5:09.2	6	0
13	9	2	Oliver Solberg	Elliott Edmondson	Hyundai Shell Mobis WRT	Hyundai i20 N Rally1	3:10:41.0	+16:12.0	0	0
30	10	42	Craig Breen	Paul Nagle	M-Sport Ford WRT	Ford Puma Rally1	4:00:09.2	+1:05:40.2	0	0
Retired SS21		44	Gus Greensmith	Jonas Andersson	M-Sport Ford WRT	Ford Puma Rally1	Transmission		0	0
Retired SS20		7	Pierre-Louis Loubet	Vincent Landais	M-Sport Ford WRT	Ford Puma Rally1	Suspension		0	0

==== Special stages ====
Stage	Winners	Car	Time	Class leaders
SD	Lappi / Ferm	Toyota GR Yaris Rally1	2:53.3	—N/a
SS1	Breen / Nagle	Ford Puma Rally1	1:38.7	Breen / Nagle
SS2	Evans / Martin	Toyota GR Yaris Rally1	13:24.7	Evans / Martin
SS3	Evans / Martin	Toyota GR Yaris Rally1	8:57.2	Evans / Martin
SS4	Evans / Martin	Toyota GR Yaris Rally1	10:18.5	Evans / Martin
SS5	Evans / Martin	Toyota GR Yaris Rally1	4:16.8	Evans / Martin
SS6	Evans / Martin	Toyota GR Yaris Rally1	13:37.5	Evans / Martin
SS7	Rovanperä / Halttunen	Toyota GR Yaris Rally1	8:58.6	Evans / Martin
SS8	Rovanperä / Halttunen	Toyota GR Yaris Rally1	10:24.4	Evans / Martin
SS9	Rovanperä / Halttunen	Toyota GR Yaris Rally1	4:23.2	Rovanperä / Halttunen
SS10	Evans / Martin	Toyota GR Yaris Rally1	5:57.2	Rovanperä / Halttunen
SS11	Rovanperä / Halttunen	Toyota GR Yaris Rally1	5:48.1	Rovanperä / Halttunen
SS12	Rovanperä / Halttunen	Toyota GR Yaris Rally1	8:30.5	Rovanperä / Halttunen
SS13	Rovanperä / Halttunen	Toyota GR Yaris Rally1	4:38.9	Rovanperä / Halttunen
SS14	Rovanperä / Halttunen	Toyota GR Yaris Rally1	5:57.5	Rovanperä / Halttunen
SS15	Rovanperä / Halttunen	Toyota GR Yaris Rally1	5:43.6	Rovanperä / Halttunen
SS16	Rovanperä / Halttunen	Toyota GR Yaris Rally1	8:34.9	Rovanperä / Halttunen
SS17	Rovanperä / Halttunen	Toyota GR Yaris Rally1	4:41.4	Rovanperä / Halttunen
SS18	Fourmaux / Coria	Ford Puma Rally1	1:39.8	Rovanperä / Halttunen
SS19	Rovanperä / Halttunen	Toyota GR Yaris Rally1	5:41.5	Rovanperä / Halttunen
SS20	Rovanperä / Halttunen; Tänak / Järveoja	Toyota GR Yaris Rally1; Hyundai i20 N Rally1	8:09.6	Rovanperä / Halttunen
SS21	Rovanperä / Halttunen	Toyota GR Yaris Rally1	8:48.8	Rovanperä / Halttunen
SS22	Lappi / Ferm	Toyota GR Yaris Rally1	5:38.7	Rovanperä / Halttunen
SS23	Lappi / Ferm	Toyota GR Yaris Rally1	8:16.4	Rovanperä / Halttunen
SS24	Rovanperä / Halttunen	Toyota GR Yaris Rally1	9:18.2	Rovanperä / Halttunen

==== Championship standings ====
Pos.	Drivers' championships			Co-drivers' championships			Manufacturers' championships		
Pos.	Move	Driver	Points	Move	Co-driver	Points	Move	Manufacturer	Points
1		Kalle Rovanperä	175		Jonne Halttunen	175		Toyota Gazoo Racing WRT	298
2		Thierry Neuville	92		Martijn Wydaeghe	92		Hyundai Shell Mobis WRT	211
3	3	Elfyn Evans	79	3	Scott Martin	79		M-Sport Ford WRT	156
4	1	Ott Tänak	77	1	Martin Järveoja	77		Toyota Gazoo Racing WRT NG	79
5	1	Takamoto Katsuta	73	1	Aaron Johnston	73			

=== WRC-2 Rally2 ===
==== Classification ====
Position		No.	Driver	Co-driver	Entrant	Car	Time	Difference	Points		
Event	Class	No.	Driver	Co-driver	Entrant	Car	Time	Difference	Class	Stage	Event
8	1	21	Andreas Mikkelsen	Torstein Eriksen	Toksport WRT	Škoda Fabia Rally2 evo	3:05:30.8	0.0	25	3	4+3
9	2	20	Teemu Suninen	Mikko Markkula	Hyundai Motorsport N	Hyundai i20 N Rally2	3:05:56.1	+25.3	18	2	2
10	3	27	Emil Lindholm	Reeta Hämäläinen	Toksport WRT 2	Škoda Fabia Rally2 evo	3:07:33.8	+2:03.0	15	1	1
11	4	29	Jari Huttunen	Mikko Lukka	M-Sport Ford WRT	Ford Fiesta Rally2	3:08:57.8	+3:27.0	12	0	0
12	5	25	Kajetan Kajetanowicz	Maciej Szczepaniak	Kajetan Kajetanowicz	Škoda Fabia Rally2 evo	3:10:37.7	+5:06.9	10	0	0
14	6	31	Emilio Fernández	Axel Coronado	Emilio Fernández	Škoda Fabia Rally2 evo	3:11:00.0	+5:29.2	8	0	0
15	7	24	Georg Linnamäe	Craig Drew	ALM Motorsport	Volkswagen Polo GTI R5	3:11:33.0	+6:02.2	6	0	0
19	8	38	Josh McErlean	James Fulton	Josh McErlean	Hyundai i20 N Rally2	3:15:36.7	+10:05.9	4	0	0
20	9	34	Fabrizio Zaldivar	Marcelo Der Ohannesian	Hyundai Motorsport N	Hyundai i20 N Rally2	3:15:52.8	+10:22.0	2	0	0
22	10	32	Sean Johnston	Alexander Kihurani	Saintéloc Junior Team	Citroën C3 Rally2	3:16:17.7	+10:46.9	1	0	0
24	11	36	Gregor Jeets	Timo Taniel	Gregor Jeets	Škoda Fabia Rally2 evo	3:17:47.7	+12:16.9	0	0	0
25	12	22	Egon Kaur	Silver Simm	Egon Kaur	Volkswagen Polo GTI R5	3:19:05.9	+13:35.1	0	0	0
26	13	39	Mauro Miele	Luca Beltrame	Mauro Miele	Škoda Fabia Rally2 evo	3:32:32.6	+27:01.8	0	0	0
27	14	40	Luke Anear	Andrew Sarandis	Luke Anear	Ford Fiesta Rally2	3:37:13.5	+31:42.7	0	0	0
31	15	30	Mikołaj Marczyk	Szymon Gospodarczyk	Mikołaj Marczyk	Škoda Fabia Rally2 evo	4:03:36.4	+58:05.6	0	0	0
Retired SS23		26	Marco Bulacia	Diego Vallejo	Toksport WRT	Škoda Fabia Rally2 evo	Accident		0	0	0
Retired SS12		35	Priit Koik	Kristo Tamm	Priit Koik	Ford Fiesta Rally2	Retired		0	0	0
Retired SS6		23	Hayden Paddon	John Kennard	Hayden Paddon	Hyundai i20 N Rally2	Medical		0	0	0
Retired SS4		37	Bruno Bulacia	Marc Martí	Bruno Bulacia	Škoda Fabia Rally2 evo	Mechanical		0	0	0
Did not start		82	Nikolay Gryazin	Konstantin Aleksandrov	Toksport WRT 2	Škoda Fabia Rally2 evo	Withdrawn		0	0	0

==== Special stages ====
Stage	Open Championship				Junior Championship				Masters Cup			
Stage	Winners	Car	Time	Class leaders	Winners	Car	Time	Class leaders	Winners	Car	Time	Class leaders
SD	Marczyk / Gospodarczyk	Škoda Fabia Rally2 evo	3:07.3	—N/a	Marczyk / Gospodarczyk	Škoda Fabia Rally2 evo	3:07.3	—N/a	Miele / Beltrame	Škoda Fabia Rally2 evo	3:30.5	—N/a
SS1	Huttunen / Lukka	Ford Fiesta Rally2	1:41.8	Huttunen / Lukka	M. Bulacia / Vallejo	Škoda Fabia Rally2 evo	1:42.7	M. Bulacia / Vallejo	Miele / Beltrame	Škoda Fabia Rally2 evo	1:51.8	Miele / Beltrame
SS2	Mikkelsen / Eriksen	Škoda Fabia Rally2 evo	14:19.2	Mikkelsen / Eriksen	Lindholm / Hämäläinen	Škoda Fabia Rally2 evo	14:21.4	Lindholm / Hämäläinen	Miele / Beltrame	Škoda Fabia Rally2 evo	16:20.7	Miele / Beltrame
SS3	Lindholm / Hämäläinen	Škoda Fabia Rally2 evo	9:31.3	Kaur / Simm	Lindholm / Hämäläinen	Škoda Fabia Rally2 evo	9:31.3	Lindholm / Hämäläinen	Miele / Beltrame	Škoda Fabia Rally2 evo	10:54.4	Miele / Beltrame
SS4	Lindholm / Hämäläinen	Škoda Fabia Rally2 evo	10:55.2	Lindholm / Hämäläinen	Lindholm / Hämäläinen	Škoda Fabia Rally2 evo	10:55.2	Lindholm / Hämäläinen	Miele / Beltrame	Škoda Fabia Rally2 evo	12:21.1	Miele / Beltrame
SS5	Mikkelsen / Eriksen	Škoda Fabia Rally2 evo	4:26.9	Lindholm / Hämäläinen	M. Bulacia / Vallejo	Škoda Fabia Rally2 evo	4:29.3	Lindholm / Hämäläinen	Miele / Beltrame	Škoda Fabia Rally2 evo	4:56.3	Miele / Beltrame
SS6	Mikkelsen / Eriksen	Škoda Fabia Rally2 evo	14:29.6	Mikkelsen / Eriksen	Lindholm / Hämäläinen	Škoda Fabia Rally2 evo	14:38.1	Lindholm / Hämäläinen	Miele / Beltrame	Škoda Fabia Rally2 evo	16:17.0	Miele / Beltrame
SS7	Suninen / Markkula	Hyundai i20 N Rally2	9:39.0	Lindholm / Hämäläinen	Lindholm / Hämäläinen	Škoda Fabia Rally2 evo	9:39.5	Lindholm / Hämäläinen	Miele / Beltrame	Škoda Fabia Rally2 evo	10:55.0	Miele / Beltrame
SS8	Suninen / Markkula	Hyundai i20 N Rally2	11:06.2	Mikkelsen / Eriksen	M. Bulacia / Vallejo	Škoda Fabia Rally2 evo	11:14.9	M. Bulacia / Vallejo	Miele / Beltrame	Škoda Fabia Rally2 evo	12:45.8	Miele / Beltrame
SS9	M. Bulacia / Vallejo	Škoda Fabia Rally2 evo	4:45.3	Mikkelsen / Eriksen	M. Bulacia / Vallejo	Škoda Fabia Rally2 evo	4:45.3	M. Bulacia / Vallejo	Miele / Beltrame	Škoda Fabia Rally2 evo	5:25.6	Miele / Beltrame
SS10	Suninen / Markkula	Hyundai i20 N Rally2	6:18.3	Mikkelsen / Eriksen	M. Bulacia / Vallejo	Škoda Fabia Rally2 evo	6:19.7	M. Bulacia / Vallejo	Miele / Beltrame	Škoda Fabia Rally2 evo	7:02.8	Miele / Beltrame
SS11	Suninen / Markkula; Mikkelsen / Eriksen	Hyundai i20 N Rally2; Škoda Fabia Rally2 evo	6:10.3	Mikkelsen / Eriksen	Lindholm / Hämäläinen	Škoda Fabia Rally2 evo	6:12.9	M. Bulacia / Vallejo	Miele / Beltrame	Škoda Fabia Rally2 evo	7:14.3	Miele / Beltrame
SS12	Mikkelsen / Eriksen	Škoda Fabia Rally2 evo	9:08.9	Mikkelsen / Eriksen	M. Bulacia / Vallejo	Škoda Fabia Rally2 evo	9:12.5	M. Bulacia / Vallejo	Miele / Beltrame	Škoda Fabia Rally2 evo	10:26.9	Miele / Beltrame
SS13	Zaldivar / Der Ohannesian	Hyundai i20 N Rally2	5:00.1	Mikkelsen / Eriksen	Zaldivar / Der Ohannesian	Hyundai i20 N Rally2	5:00.1	M. Bulacia / Vallejo	Miele / Beltrame	Škoda Fabia Rally2 evo	5:33.3	Miele / Beltrame
SS14	Lindholm / Hämäläinen	Škoda Fabia Rally2 evo	6:22.4	Mikkelsen / Eriksen	Lindholm / Hämäläinen	Škoda Fabia Rally2 evo	6:22.4	M. Bulacia / Vallejo	Miele / Beltrame	Škoda Fabia Rally2 evo	7:02.6	Miele / Beltrame
SS15	Mikkelsen / Eriksen	Škoda Fabia Rally2 evo	6:09.6	Mikkelsen / Eriksen	M. Bulacia / Vallejo	Škoda Fabia Rally2 evo	6:11.5	M. Bulacia / Vallejo	Miele / Beltrame	Škoda Fabia Rally2 evo	6:54.7	Miele / Beltrame
SS16	Mikkelsen / Eriksen	Škoda Fabia Rally2 evo	9:13.5	Mikkelsen / Eriksen	M. Bulacia / Vallejo	Škoda Fabia Rally2 evo	9:15.4	M. Bulacia / Vallejo	Miele / Beltrame	Škoda Fabia Rally2 evo	10:34.3	Miele / Beltrame
SS17	M. Bulacia / Vallejo	Škoda Fabia Rally2 evo	4:58.3	Mikkelsen / Eriksen	M. Bulacia / Vallejo	Škoda Fabia Rally2 evo	4:58.3	M. Bulacia / Vallejo	Miele / Beltrame	Škoda Fabia Rally2 evo	5:41.6	Miele / Beltrame
SS18	Huttunen / Lukka	Ford Fiesta Rally2	1:43.0	Mikkelsen / Eriksen	Linnamäe / Drew	Volkswagen Polo GTI R5	1:44.0	M. Bulacia / Vallejo	Miele / Beltrame	Škoda Fabia Rally2 evo	1:49.9	Miele / Beltrame
SS19	Kaur / Simm	Volkswagen Polo GTI R5	5:52.4	Mikkelsen / Eriksen	M. Bulacia / Vallejo	Škoda Fabia Rally2 evo	5:53.6	M. Bulacia / Vallejo	Miele / Beltrame	Škoda Fabia Rally2 evo	6:51.7	Miele / Beltrame
SS20	Kaur / Simm	Volkswagen Polo GTI R5	8:35.1	Mikkelsen / Eriksen	Lindholm / Hämäläinen	Škoda Fabia Rally2 evo	8:38.1	M. Bulacia / Vallejo	Miele / Beltrame	Škoda Fabia Rally2 evo	9:51.3	Miele / Beltrame
SS21	Suninen / Markkula	Hyundai i20 N Rally2	9:22.3	Mikkelsen / Eriksen	M. Bulacia / Vallejo	Škoda Fabia Rally2 evo	9:26.3	M. Bulacia / Vallejo	Miele / Beltrame	Škoda Fabia Rally2 evo	10:33.2	Miele / Beltrame
SS22	Kaur / Simm	Volkswagen Polo GTI R5	5:47.5	Mikkelsen / Eriksen	M. Bulacia / Vallejo	Škoda Fabia Rally2 evo	5:48.7	M. Bulacia / Vallejo	Miele / Beltrame	Škoda Fabia Rally2 evo	6:13.9	Miele / Beltrame
SS23	Kaur / Simm	Volkswagen Polo GTI R5	9:10.3	Mikkelsen / Eriksen	Linnamäe / Drew	Volkswagen Polo GTI R5	9:26.8	Lindholm / Hämäläinen	Miele / Beltrame	Škoda Fabia Rally2 evo	10:43.6	Miele / Beltrame
SS24	Mikkelsen / Eriksen	Škoda Fabia Rally2 evo	9:42.9	Mikkelsen / Eriksen	Lindholm / Hämäläinen	Škoda Fabia Rally2 evo	10:20.6	Lindholm / Hämäläinen	Miele / Beltrame	Škoda Fabia Rally2 evo	14:00.8	Miele / Beltrame

==== Championship standings ====
Pos.	Open Drivers' championships			Open Co-drivers' championships			Teams' championships			Junior Drivers' championships			Junior Co-drivers' championships			Driver Masters' championships			Co-driver Masters' championships		
Pos.	Move	Driver	Points	Move	Co-driver	Points	Move	Manufacturer	Points	Move	Manufacturer	Points	Move	Driver	Points	Move	Driver	Points	Move	Driver	Points
1	3	Andreas Mikkelsen	79	3	Torstein Eriksen	79		Toksport WRT	112		Chris Ingram	67		James Fulton	93		Mauro Miele	86		Laurent Magat	75
2	1	Kajetan Kajetanowicz	66	1	Maciej Szczepaniak	66	1	Hyundai Motorsport N	91		Nikolay Gryazin	61		Louis Louka	43		Jean-Michel Raoux	52		Michael Joseph Morrissey	36
3	1	Yohan Rossel	63	1	Valentin Sarreaud	52	1	Toksport WRT 2	58	3	Emil Lindholm	58		Elia De Guio	25		Freddy Loix	40		Michela Lorigiola	30
4	1	Nikolay Gryazin	52	1	Konstantin Aleksandrov	52		Yaco ACCR Team	50	3	Georg Linnamäe	47		Samu Vaaleri	25		Olivier Burri	33		Jörgen Fornander	25
5	1	Jari Huttunen	45	1	Mikko Lukka	45		Saintéloc Junior Team	40	2	Erik Cais	45					Fabrizio Arengi	28		Hans van Goor	25

=== WRC-3 Rally3 ===
==== Classification ====
Position		No.	Driver	Co-driver	Entrant	Car	Time	Difference	Points		
Event	Class	No.	Driver	Co-driver	Entrant	Car	Time	Difference	Open	Junior	Stage
16	1	45	Sami Pajari	Enni Mälkönen	Sami Pajari	Ford Fiesta Rally3	3:13:58.6	0.0	25	25	4
17	2	46	Robert Virves	Julia Thulin	Starter Energy Racing	Ford Fiesta Rally3	3:14:13.5	+14.9	—N/a	18	17
18	3	41	Jon Armstrong	Brian Hoy	Jon Armstrong	Ford Fiesta Rally3	3:14:58.0	+59.4	—N/a	15	3
21	4	43	Lauri Joona	Mikael Korhonen	Lauri Joona	Ford Fiesta Rally3	3:16:14.3	+2:15.7	18	12	1
23	5	47	William Creighton	Liam Regan	Motorsport Ireland Rally Academy	Ford Fiesta Rally3	3:17:44.9	+3:46.3	15	10	0
29	6	49	McRae Kimathi	Mwangi Kioni	McRae Kimathi	Ford Fiesta Rally3	3:53:12.2	+39:13.6	12	8	0
33	7	48	Roope Korhonen	Anssi Viinikka	Roope Korhonen	Ford Fiesta Rally3	4:28:46.9	+1:14:48.3	10	—N/a	—N/a

==== Special stages ====
Stage	Open Championship				Junior Championship			
Stage	Winners	Car	Time	Class leaders	Winners	Car	Time	Class leaders
SD	Pajari / Mälkönen	Ford Fiesta Rally3	3:19.1	—N/a	Virves / Thulin	Ford Fiesta Rally3	3:16.9	—N/a
SS1	Joona / Korhonen	Ford Fiesta Rally3	1:45.2	Joona / Korhonen	Joona / Korhonen	Ford Fiesta Rally3	1:45.2	Joona / Korhonen
SS2	Pajari / Mälkönen	Ford Fiesta Rally3	15:05.0	Pajari / Mälkönen	Virves / Thulin	Ford Fiesta Rally3	14:59.2	Virves / Thulin
SS3	Pajari / Mälkönen	Ford Fiesta Rally3	10:02.1	Pajari / Mälkönen	Pajari / Mälkönen	Ford Fiesta Rally3	10:02.1	Virves / Thulin
SS4	Pajari / Mälkönen	Ford Fiesta Rally3	11:25.6	Pajari / Mälkönen	Virves / Thulin	Ford Fiesta Rally3	11:24.7	Virves / Thulin
SS5	Pajari / Mälkönen	Ford Fiesta Rally3	4:37.0	Pajari / Mälkönen	Virves / Thulin	Ford Fiesta Rally3	4:36.4	Virves / Thulin
SS6	Pajari / Mälkönen	Ford Fiesta Rally3	15:05.2	Pajari / Mälkönen	Pajari / Mälkönen	Ford Fiesta Rally3	15:05.2	Pajari / Mälkönen
SS7	Pajari / Mälkönen	Ford Fiesta Rally3	10:09.5	Pajari / Mälkönen	Pajari / Mälkönen	Ford Fiesta Rally3	10:09.5	Pajari / Mälkönen
SS8	Pajari / Mälkönen	Ford Fiesta Rally3	11:34.9	Pajari / Mälkönen	Pajari / Mälkönen	Ford Fiesta Rally3	11:34.9	Pajari / Mälkönen
SS9	Pajari / Mälkönen	Ford Fiesta Rally3	4:51.6	Pajari / Mälkönen	Armstrong / Hoy	Ford Fiesta Rally3	4:49.8	Pajari / Mälkönen
SS10	Korhonen / Viinikka	Ford Fiesta Rally3	6:38.1	Pajari / Mälkönen	Virves / Thulin	Ford Fiesta Rally3	6:34.5	Pajari / Mälkönen
SS11	Korhonen / Viinikka	Ford Fiesta Rally3	6:26.0	Pajari / Mälkönen	Virves / Thulin	Ford Fiesta Rally3	6:25.2	Pajari / Mälkönen
SS12	Korhonen / Viinikka	Ford Fiesta Rally3	9:41.7	Pajari / Mälkönen	Virves / Thulin	Ford Fiesta Rally3	9:36.9	Pajari / Mälkönen
SS13	Korhonen / Viinikka	Ford Fiesta Rally3	5:09.6	Pajari / Mälkönen	Virves / Thulin	Ford Fiesta Rally3	5:05.4	Pajari / Mälkönen
SS14	Korhonen / Viinikka	Ford Fiesta Rally3	6:37.7	Pajari / Mälkönen	Virves / Thulin	Ford Fiesta Rally3	6:35.1	Pajari / Mälkönen
SS15	Korhonen / Viinikka	Ford Fiesta Rally3	6:29.5	Pajari / Mälkönen	Virves / Thulin	Ford Fiesta Rally3	6:28.1	Pajari / Mälkönen
SS16	Korhonen / Viinikka	Ford Fiesta Rally3	9:46.9	Pajari / Mälkönen	Virves / Thulin	Ford Fiesta Rally3	9:44.6	Pajari / Mälkönen
SS17	Creighton / Regan	Ford Fiesta Rally3	5:15.6	Pajari / Mälkönen	Armstrong / Hoy	Ford Fiesta Rally3	5:10.3	Pajari / Mälkönen
SS18	Korhonen / Viinikka	Ford Fiesta Rally3	1:46.8	Pajari / Mälkönen	Armstrong / Hoy; Virves / Thulin	Ford Fiesta Rally3; Ford Fiesta Rally3	1:46.9	Pajari / Mälkönen
SS19	Pajari / Mälkönen	Ford Fiesta Rally3	6:02.4	Pajari / Mälkönen	Virves / Thulin	Ford Fiesta Rally3	5:59.6	Pajari / Mälkönen
SS20	Pajari / Mälkönen	Ford Fiesta Rally3	8:59.2	Pajari / Mälkönen	Virves / Thulin	Ford Fiesta Rally3	8:53.0	Pajari / Mälkönen
SS21	Pajari / Mälkönen	Ford Fiesta Rally3	9:35.9	Pajari / Mälkönen	Virves / Thulin	Ford Fiesta Rally3	9:34.4	Pajari / Mälkönen
SS22	Pajari / Mälkönen	Ford Fiesta Rally3	6:01.7	Pajari / Mälkönen	Virves / Thulin	Ford Fiesta Rally3	5:58.4	Pajari / Mälkönen
SS23	Korhonen / Viinikka	Ford Fiesta Rally3	9:24.2	Pajari / Mälkönen	Virves / Thulin	Ford Fiesta Rally3	9:16.7	Pajari / Mälkönen
SS24	Korhonen / Viinikka	Ford Fiesta Rally3	10:43.6	Pajari / Mälkönen	Virves / Thulin	Ford Fiesta Rally3	10:49.9	Pajari / Mälkönen

==== Championship standings ====
Pos.	Open Drivers' championships			Open Co-drivers' championships			Junior Drivers' championships			Junior Co-drivers' championships		
Pos.	Move	Driver	Points	Move	Co-driver	Points	Move	Driver	Points	Move	Co-driver	Points
1		Sami Pajari	87		Enni Mälkönen	87	2	Sami Pajari	85	2	Enni Mälkönen	85
2	3	Lauri Joona	61		Mikael Korhonen	61	1	Jon Armstrong	85	1	Brian Hoy	85
3	1	McRae Kimathi	57	2	Liam Regan	45	1	Robert Virves	84	1	Mikael Korhonen	79
4	3	William Creighton	45		Tamás Kürti	43	2	Lauri Joona	79		Aleks Lesk	49
5	2	Jan Černý	43	1	Mwangi Kioni	42		William Creighton	38		Liam Regan	38

== Notes ==
Previous rally: 2022 Safari Rally	2022 FIA World Rally Championship	Next rally: 2022 Rally Finland
Previous rally: 2021 Rally Estonia	2022 Rally Estonia	Next rally: 2023 Rally Estonia
