= Mikko Lukka =

Finnish rally co-driver (born 1974)

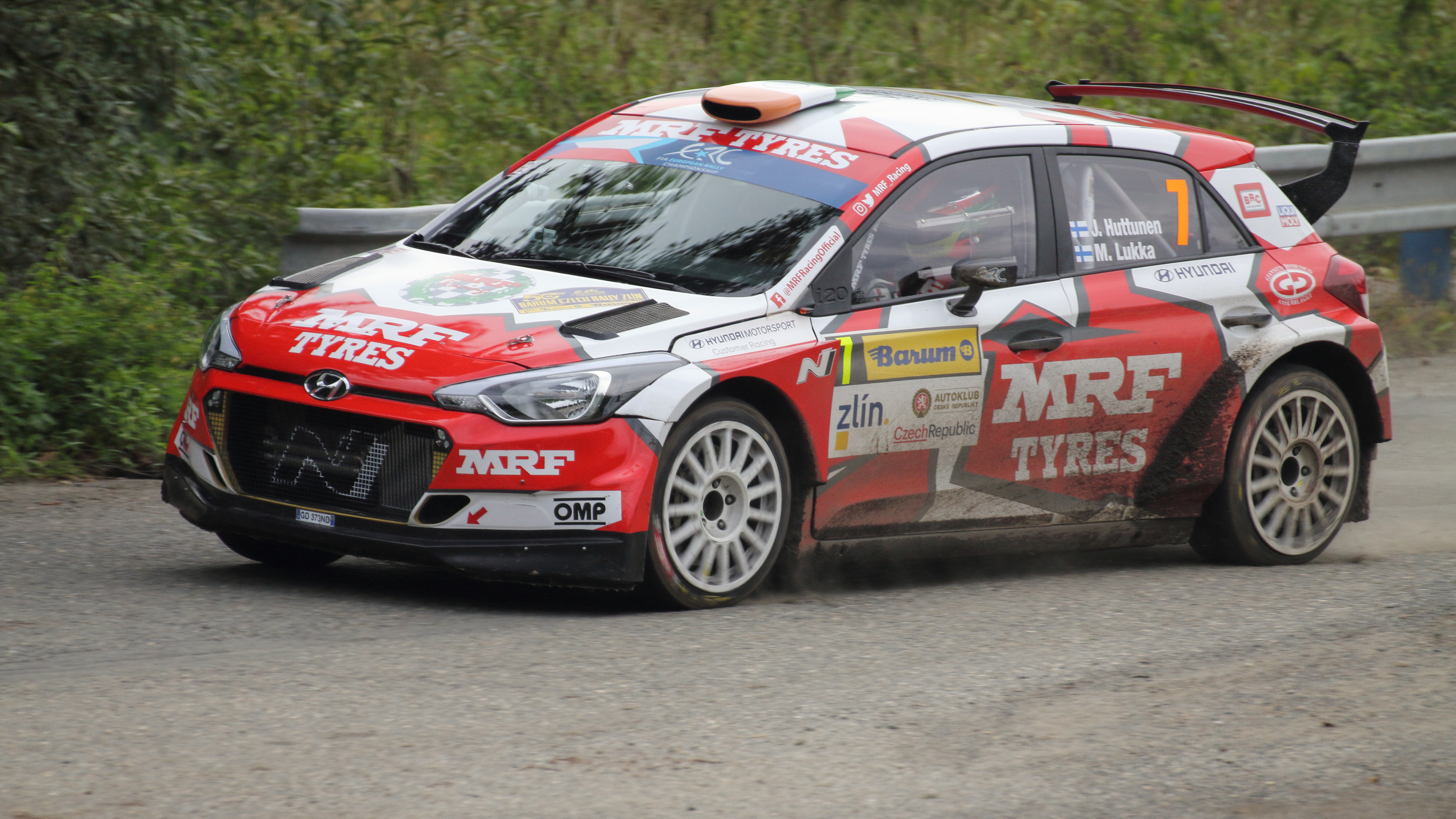

Personal information
- Nationality: Finland
- Born: May 25, 1974 (age 52)

World Rally Championship record
- Years active: 2005, 2007, 2009–2017, 2019–present
- Driver: (Finland) Jari Huttunen
- Teams: M-Sport Ford WRT
- Rallies: 38
- Championships: 0
- Rally wins: 0
- Podiums: 0
- Stage wins: 0
- First rally: 2005 Rally Finland

Mikko Lukka (born 25 May 1974) is a Finnish rally co-driver. He is the co-driver of compatriot Jari Huttunen. They are the champions of the 2020 World Rally Championship-3.

== Rally results ==
=== WRC results ===
Year	Entrant	Car	1	2	3	4	5	6	7	8	9	10	11	12	13	14	15	16	Pos.	Points
2005	Jarno Kinnunen	Mitsubishi Lancer Evo VIII	MON	SWE	MEX	NZL	ITA	CYP	TUR	GRE	ARG	FIN; 20	GER	GBR	JPN	FRA	ESP	AUS	NC	0
2007	Jarno Kinnunen	Subaru Impreza STi N12	MON	SWE	NOR	MEX	POR	ARG	ITA	GRE	FIN; 37	GER	NZL	ESP	FRA	JPN	IRE	GBR	NC	0
2009	Matti Rantanen	Ford Focus RS WRC	IRE	NOR	CYP	POR	ARG	ITA	GRE	POL	FIN; 5	AUS	ESP	GBR					15th	4
2010	Matti Rantanen	Škoda Fabia S2000	SWE	MEX	JOR	TUR	NZL	POR	BUL	FIN; Ret	GER	JPN	FRA	ESP	GBR				NC	0
2011	Matti Rantanen	Mitsubishi Lancer Evo X R4	SWE	MEX	POR	JOR	ITA; Ret	ARG	GRE										NC	0
2011	Matti Rantanen	Mini John Cooper Works WRC								FIN; Ret	GER	AUS	FRA	ESP	GBR				NC	0
2012	Matti Rantanen	Ford Fiesta RS WRC	MON	SWE	MEX	POR	ARG	GRE	NZL	FIN; 7	GER	GBR	FRA	ITA	ESP				23rd	6
2013	Andreas Amberg	Ford Fiesta R2	MON	SWE	MEX	POR; NC	ARG	GRE; Ret	ITA	FIN; NC	GER	AUS	FRA	ESP	GBR				NC	0
2014	Max Vatanen	Ford Fiesta R2	MON	SWE	MEX	POR; Ret	ARG	ITA	POL; 32	FIN; 27	GER; 40	AUS	FRA	ESP; 33	GBR				NC	0
2015	Alain Foulon	Mitsubishi Lancer Evo X	MON	SWE	MEX	ARG	POR	ITA	POL	FIN; 39	GER	AUS	FRA	ESP	GBR				NC	0
2017	Kees Burger	Škoda Fabia R5	MON	SWE	MEX	FRA	ARG	POR	ITA; 32	POL	FIN; 23	GER	ESP	GBR	AUS				NC	0
2019	Jari Huttunen	Hyundai i20 R5	MON	SWE	MEX	FRA	ARG	CHL	POR	ITA	FIN; 11	GER	TUR	GBR	ESP	AUS; C			NC	0
2020	Jari Huttunen	Hyundai i20 R5	MON	SWE; 10	MEX	EST; 11	TUR	ITA; 8	MNZ; 8										14th	9
2021	Hyundai Motorsport N	Hyundai i20 R5	MON	ARC; Ret	CRO	POR	ITA; 5	KEN	EST; Ret										19th	10
2021	Hyundai Motorsport N	Hyundai i20 N Rally2								BEL; 19	GRE	FIN; 11	ESP; Ret						19th	10
2021	Kees Burger	Škoda Fabia R5				POR; 34													19th	10
2021	M-Sport Ford WRT	Ford Fiesta Rally2												MNZ; 14					19th	10
2022	M-Sport Ford WRT	Ford Fiesta Rally2	MON	SWE; 9	CRO; 28	POR	ITA; 10	KEN	EST; 11		BEL; Ret	GRE	NZL	ESP; 15	JPN				26th	5
2022	M-Sport Ford WRT	Ford Puma Rally1								FIN; 9									26th	5

* Season still in progress.
