= 2022 Croatia Rally =

46th edition of Croatia Rally

2022 Croatia Rally Rally Croatia 2022
Round 3 of 13 in the 2022 World Rally Championship
← Previous event	Next event →
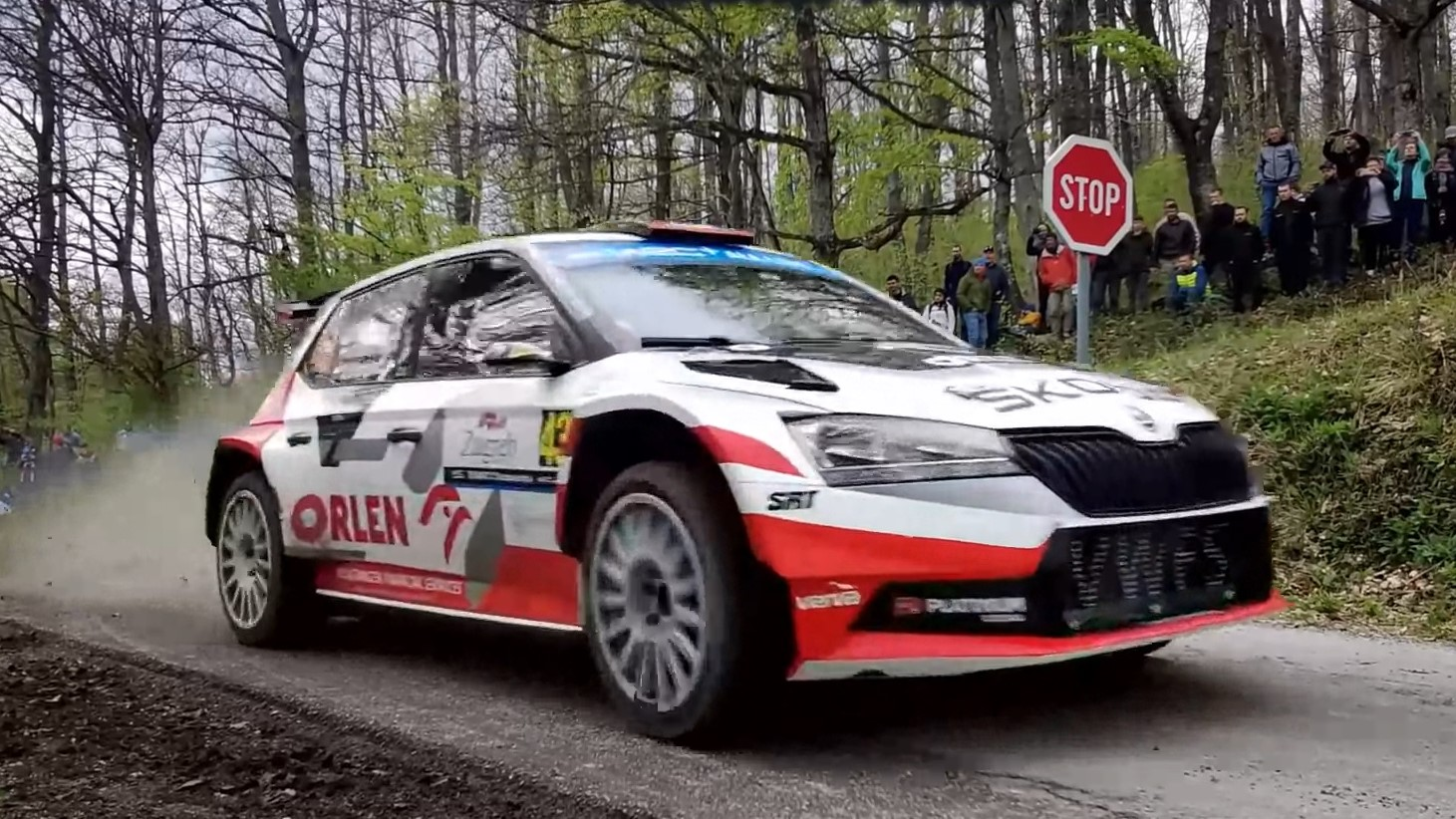
- The Croatia Rally was the first tarmac rally on the calendar.
- Host country: Croatia
- Rally base: Zagreb
- Dates run: 21 – 24 April 2022
- Start location: Samobor, Zagreb County
- Finish location: Kumrovec, Krapina-Zagorje
- Stages: 20 (291.84 km; 181.34 miles)
- Stage surface: Tarmac
- Transport distance: 979.55 km (608.66 miles)
- Overall distance: 1,356.29 km (842.76 miles)

Statistics
- Crews registered: 66
- Crews: 63 at start, 56 at finish
- Cancellation: SS15 cancelled due to safety concern.

Overall results
- Overall winner: (Finland) Kalle Rovanperä (Finland) Jonne Halttunen (Japan) Toyota Gazoo Racing WRT; 2:48:21.5
- Power Stage winner: (Finland) Kalle Rovanperä (Finland) Jonne Halttunen (Japan) Toyota Gazoo Racing WRT; 9:01.8

Support category results
- WRC-2 winner: (France) Yohan Rossel (France) Benjamin Boulloud (France) PH Sport; 2:58:22.5
- WRC-3 winner: (Hungary) Zoltán László (Hungary) Tamás Kürti; 3:32:47.0
- J-WRC winner: (Finland) Lauri Joona (Finland) Mikael Korhonen; 3:07:24.9

The 2022 Croatia Rally (also known as the Rally Croatia 2022) was a motor racing event for rally cars that was held over four days between 21 and 24 April 2022. It marked the 46th running of the Croatia Rally, and was the third round of the 2022 World Rally Championship, World Rally Championship-2 and World Rally Championship-3. The 2022 event was based in Zagreb in Central Croatia and was contested over 20 special stages, covering a total competitive distance of 291.84 km (181.34 mi).

Sébastien Ogier and Julien Ingrassia were the defending rally winners. However, they did not complete to defend their title as Ogier undertook a partial program in 2022 and Ingrassia retired from the sport at the end of 2021 season. Mads Østberg and Torstein Eriksen were the defending rally winners in the WRC-2 category. Kajetan Kajetanowicz and Maciej Szczepaniak were the defending rally winners in the WRC-3 category, with the British crew of Jon Armstrong and Phil Hall were the defending title-holders in the junior class.

Kalle Rovanperä and Jonne Halttunen won a back-to-back victory. Their team, Toyota Gazoo Racing WRT, successfully defended their title. Yohan Rossel and Valentin Sarreaud won the World Rally Championship-2 category. Zoltán László and Tamás Kürti won the World Rally Championship-3 category, while the Finnish crew of the Lauri Joona and Mikael Korhonen won the junior class.

== Background ==
=== Entry list ===
The following crews are set to enter into the rally. The event will be opened to crews competing in the World Rally Championship, its support categories, the World Rally Championship-2 and World Rally Championship-3, and privateer entries that are not registered to score points in any championship. Eleven crews were entered under Rally1 regulations, as are twenty-nine Rally2 crews in the World Rally Championship-2 and eleven Rally3 crews in the World Rally Championship-3.

Rally1 entries competing in the World Rally Championship
No.	Driver	Co-Driver	Entrant	Car	Championship eligibility	Tyre
2	(Sweden) Oliver Solberg	(United Kingdom) Elliott Edmondson	(South Korea) Hyundai Shell Mobis WRT	Hyundai i20 N Rally1	Driver, Co-driver, Manufacturer	P
4	(Finland) Esapekka Lappi	(Finland) Janne Ferm	(Japan) Toyota Gazoo Racing WRT	Toyota GR Yaris Rally1	Driver, Co-driver, Manufacturer	P
7	(France) Pierre-Louis Loubet	(France) Vincent Landais	(United Kingdom) M-Sport Ford WRT	Ford Puma Rally1	Driver, Co-driver	P
8	(Estonia) Ott Tänak	(Estonia) Martin Järveoja	(South Korea) Hyundai Shell Mobis WRT	Hyundai i20 N Rally1	Driver, Co-driver, Manufacturer	P
11	(Belgium) Thierry Neuville	(Belgium) Martijn Wydaeghe	(South Korea) Hyundai Shell Mobis WRT	Hyundai i20 N Rally1	Driver, Co-driver, Manufacturer	P
16	(France) Adrien Fourmaux	(France) Alexandre Coria	(United Kingdom) M-Sport Ford WRT	Ford Puma Rally1	Driver, Co-driver, Manufacturer	P
18	(Japan) Takamoto Katsuta	(Republic of Ireland) Aaron Johnston	(Japan) Toyota Gazoo Racing WRT NG	Toyota GR Yaris Rally1	Driver, Co-driver, Manufacturer/Team	P
33	(United Kingdom) Elfyn Evans	(United Kingdom) Scott Martin	(Japan) Toyota Gazoo Racing WRT	Toyota GR Yaris Rally1	Driver, Co-driver, Manufacturer	P
42	(Republic of Ireland) Craig Breen	(Republic of Ireland) Paul Nagle	(United Kingdom) M-Sport Ford WRT	Ford Puma Rally1	Driver, Co-driver, Manufacturer	P
44	(United Kingdom) Gus Greensmith	(Sweden) Jonas Andersson	(United Kingdom) M-Sport Ford WRT	Ford Puma Rally1	Driver, Co-driver, Manufacturer	P
69	(Finland) Kalle Rovanperä	(Finland) Jonne Halttunen	(Japan) Toyota Gazoo Racing WRT	Toyota GR Yaris Rally1	Driver, Co-driver, Manufacturer	P

Rally2 entries competing in the World Rally Championship-2
No.	Driver	Co-Driver	Entrant	Car	Championship eligibility	Tyre
20	(France) Stéphane Lefebvre	(France) Andy Malfoy	(Belgium) DG Sport Compétition	Citroën C3 Rally2	Driver, Co-driver	P
21	(France) Yohan Rossel	(France) Valentin Sarreaud	(France) PH Sport	Citroën C3 Rally2	Driver, Co-driver	P
22	(France) Eric Camilli	(France) Thibault de la Haye	(France) Saintéloc Junior Team	Citroën C3 Rally2	Driver, Co-driver, Team	P
23	Nikolay Gryazin (Note: Nikolay Gryazin is Russian, but he competes as a neutral competitor using the ANA flag as Russian national emblems were banned by the association due to the Russian invasion of Ukraine.)	Konstantin Aleksandrov (Note: Konstantin Aleksandrov is Russian, but he competes as a neutral competitor using the ANA flag as Russian national emblems were banned by the association due to the Russian invasion of Ukraine.)	(Germany) Toksport WRT 2	Škoda Fabia Rally2 evo	Junior Driver, Co-driver, Team	P
24	(Poland) Kajetan Kajetanowicz	(Poland) Maciej Szczepaniak	(Poland) Kajetan Kajetanowicz	Škoda Fabia Rally2 evo	Driver, Co-driver	P
25	(Czech Republic) Erik Cais	(Czech Republic) Petr Těšínský	(Czech Republic) Yacco ACCR Team	Ford Fiesta Rally2	Junior Driver, Co-driver, Team	P
26	(Finland) Emil Lindholm	(Finland) Reeta Hämäläinen	(Germany) Toksport WRT 2	Škoda Fabia Rally2 evo	Junior Driver, Co-driver, Team	P
27	(Finland) Jari Huttunen	(Finland) Mikko Lukka	(United Kingdom) M-Sport Ford WRT	Ford Fiesta Rally2	Driver, Co-driver	P
28	(Luxembourg) Grégoire Munster	(Belgium) Louis Louka	(Luxembourg) Grégoire Munster	Hyundai i20 N Rally2	Junior Driver, Junior Co-driver	P
29	(United Kingdom) Chris Ingram	(United Kingdom) Craig Drew	(United Kingdom) Chris Ingram	Škoda Fabia Rally2 evo	Junior Driver, Co-driver	P
30	(Estonia) Georg Linnamäe	(United Kingdom) James Morgan	(Estonia) ALM Motorsport	Volkswagen Polo GTI R5	Junior Driver, Co-driver	P
31	(Finland) Mikko Heikkilä	(Finland) Samu Vaaleri	(Finland) Mikko Heikkilä	Škoda Fabia Rally2 evo	Junior Driver, Junior Co-driver	P
32	(United States) Sean Johnston	(United States) Alexander Kihurani	(France) Saintéloc Junior Team	Citroën C3 Rally2	Driver, Co-driver, Team	P
34	(Mexico) Benito Guerra	(Spain) Daniel Cué	(Mexico) Benito Guerra	Škoda Fabia Rally2 evo	Driver, Co-driver	P
35	(Germany) Armin Kremer	(Germany) Timo Gottschalk	(Germany) Armin Kremer	Škoda Fabia Rally2 evo	Masters Driver, Co-driver	P
36	(United Kingdom) Neil Simpson	(United Kingdom) Michael Gibson	(United Kingdom) Neil Simpson	Škoda Fabia Rally2 evo	Driver, Co-driver	P
37	(Italy) Mauro Miele	(Italy) Luca Beltrame	(Italy) Mauro Miele	Škoda Fabia Rally2 evo	Masters Driver, Co-driver	P
38	(France) Pierre Ragues	(France) Julien Pesenti	(Czech Republic) Yacco ACCR Team	Volkswagen Polo GTI R5	Driver, Co-driver, Team	P
39	(Switzerland) Olivier Burri	(France) Anderson Levratti	(Switzerland) Olivier Burri	Volkswagen Polo GTI R5	Masters Driver, Co-driver	P
40	(Croatia) Niko Pulić	(Croatia) Aleksandra Kovačić	(Croatia) Niko Pulić	Škoda Fabia Rally2 evo	Masters Driver, Co-driver	P
41	(Austria) Johannes Keferböck	(Austria) Ilka Minor	(Austria) Johannes Keferböck	Škoda Fabia Rally2 evo	Driver, Co-driver	P
43	(Poland) Mikołaj Marczyk	(Poland) Szymon Gospodarczyk	(Poland) Mikołaj Marczyk	Škoda Fabia Rally2 evo	Junior Driver, Co-driver	P
45	(Italy) Fabrizio Arengi	(Italy) Massimiliano Bosi	(Italy) Fabrizio Arengi	Škoda Fabia Rally2 evo	Masters Driver, Co-driver	P
46	(Netherlands) Henk Vossen	(Netherlands) Hans van Goor	(Netherlands) Henk Vossen	Ford Fiesta R5	Masters Driver, Masters Co-driver	P
47	(Slovenia) Aljoša Novak	(Slovenia) Uroš Ocvirk	(Slovenia) Aljoša Novak	Škoda Fabia Rally2 evo	Junior Driver, Co-driver	P
48	(Brazil) Paulo Nobre	(Brazil) Gabriel Morales	(Brazil) Paulo Nobre	Škoda Fabia R5	Masters Driver, Co-driver	P
49	(Japan) Osamu Fukunaga	(Japan) Misako Saida	(Japan) Osamu Fukunaga	Škoda Fabia Rally2 evo	Masters Driver, Co-driver	P
50	(Italy) Carlo Covi	(Italy) Michela Lorigiola	(Italy) Carlo Covi	Škoda Fabia R5	Masters Driver, Masters Co-driver	P
51	(Italy) Filippo Marchino	(Italy) Roberto Briani	(Italy) Filippo Marchino	Škoda Fabia R5	Driver, Co-driver	P

Rally3 entries competing in the World Rally Championship-3
No.	Driver	Co-Driver	Entrant	Car	Championship eligibility	Tyre
52	(United Kingdom) Jon Armstrong	(Republic of Ireland) Brian Hoy	(United Kingdom) Jon Armstrong	Ford Fiesta Rally3	Junior	P
53	(Finland) Lauri Joona	(Finland) Mikael Korhonen	(Finland) Lauri Joona	Ford Fiesta Rally3	Junior	P
54	(Finland) Sami Pajari	(Finland) Enni Mälkönen	(Finland) Sami Pajari	Ford Fiesta Rally3	Junior, Open	P
55	(Czech Republic) Jan Černý	(Czech Republic) Petr Jindra	(Czech Republic) Jan Černý	Ford Fiesta Rally3	Open	—N/a
56	(Republic of Ireland) William Creighton	(Republic of Ireland) Liam Regan	(Republic of Ireland) Motorsport Ireland Rally Academy	Ford Fiesta Rally3	Junior, Open	P
57	(Estonia) Robert Virves	(Estonia) Aleks Lesk	(Estonia) Starter Energy Racing	Ford Fiesta Rally3	Junior	P
58	(France) Jean-Baptiste Franceschi	(France) Anthony Gorguilo	(France) Jean-Baptiste Franceschi	Ford Fiesta Rally3	Junior	P
59	(Italy) Enrico Brazzoli	(Italy) Manuel Fenoli	(Italy) Enrico Brazzoli	Ford Fiesta Rally3	Open	P
60	(Hungary) Zoltán László	(Hungary) Tamás Kürti	(Hungary) Zoltán László	Ford Fiesta Rally3	Open	P
61	(Croatia) Ivica Siladić	(Croatia) Jasna Durak	(Croatia) Ivica Siladić	Ford Fiesta Rally3	Open	P
62	(Kenya) McRae Kimathi	(Kenya) Mwangi Kioni	(Kenya) McRae Kimathi	Ford Fiesta Rally3	Junior, Open	P

=== Itinerary ===
All dates and times are CEST (UTC+2).

Date	Time	No.	Stage name	Distance
21 April	09:01	—	Okić [Shakedown]	3.65 km
22 April	8:33	SS1	Mali Lipovec – Grdanjci 1	19.20 km
22 April	9:26	SS2	Stojdraga – Gornja Vas 1	20.77 km
22 April	10:19	SS3	Krašić – Vrškovac 1	11.11 km
22 April	11:32	SS4	Pećurkovo Brdo – Mrežnički Novaki 1	9.11 km
22 April	15:05	SS5	Mali Lipovec – Grdanjci 2	19.20 km
22 April	15:58	SS6	Stojdraga – Gornja Vas 2	20.77 km
22 April	16:51	SS7	Krašić – Vrškovac 2	11.11 km
22 April	18:04	SS8	Pećurkovo Brdo – Mrežnički Novaki 2	9.11 km
23 April	7:43	SS9	Kostanjevac – Petruš Vrh 1	23.76 km
23 April	8:41	SS10	Jaškovo – Mali Modruš Potok 1	10.10 km
23 April	10:09	SS11	Platak 1	15.85 km
23 April	11:38	SS12	Vinski Vrh – Duga Resa 1	8.78 km
23 April	15:16	SS13	Kostanjevac – Petruš Vrh 2	23.76 km
23 April	16:14	SS14	Jaškovo – Mali Modruš Potok 2	10.10 km
23 April	17:42	SS15	Platak 2	15.85 km
23 April	19:08	SS16	Vinski Vrh – Duga Resa 2	8.78 km
24 April	7:18	SS17	Trakošćan – Vrbno 1	13.15 km
24 April	8:38	SS18	Zagorska Sela – Kumrovec 1	14.09 km
24 April	10:26	SS19	Trakošćan – Vrbno 2	13.15 km
24 April	13:18	SS20	Zagorska Sela – Kumrovec 2 [Power Stage]	14.09 km

== Report ==
=== WRC Rally1 ===
==== Classification ====
Position		No.	Driver	Co-driver	Entrant	Car	Time	Difference	Points	
Event	Class	No.	Driver	Co-driver	Entrant	Car	Time	Difference	Event	Stage
1	1	69	Kalle Rovanperä	Jonne Halttunen	Toyota Gazoo Racing WRT	Toyota GR Yaris Rally1	2:48:21.5	0.0	25	5
2	2	8	Ott Tänak	Martin Järveoja	Hyundai Shell Mobis WRT	Hyundai i20 N Rally1	2:48:25.8	+4.3	18	4
3	3	11	Thierry Neuville	Martijn Wydaeghe	Hyundai Shell Mobis WRT	Hyundai i20 N Rally1	2:50:42.5	+2:21.0	15	0
4	4	42	Craig Breen	Paul Nagle	M-Sport Ford WRT	Ford Puma Rally1	2:51:28.8	+3:07.3	12	2
5	5	33	Elfyn Evans	Scott Martin	Toyota Gazoo Racing WRT	Toyota GR Yaris Rally1	2:52:07.5	+3:46.0	10	3
6	6	18	Takamoto Katsuta	Aaron Johnston	Toyota Gazoo Racing WRT NG	Toyota GR Yaris Rally1	2:56:30.0	+8:08.5	8	0
15	7	44	Gus Greensmith	Jonas Andersson	M-Sport Ford WRT	Ford Puma Rally1	3:04:48.2	+16:26.7	6	0
47	8	7	Pierre-Louis Loubet	Vincent Landais	M-Sport Ford WRT	Ford Puma Rally1	3:55:58.0	+1:07:36.5	4	0
49	9	4	Esapekka Lappi	Janne Ferm	Toyota Gazoo Racing WRT	Toyota GR Yaris Rally1	4:09:53.2	+1:21:31.7	2	0
Retired SS9		2	Oliver Solberg	Elliott Edmondson	Hyundai Shell Mobis WRT	Hyundai i20 N Rally1	Fire		0	0
Retired SS3		16	Adrien Fourmaux	Alexandre Coria	M-Sport Ford WRT	Ford Puma Rally1	Crash		0	0

==== Special stages ====
Stage	Winners	Car	Time	Class leaders
SD	Rovanperä / Halttunen	Toyota GR Yaris Rally1	1:52.5	—N/a
SS1	Rovanperä / Halttunen	Toyota GR Yaris Rally1	12:44.6	Rovanperä / Halttunen
SS2	Rovanperä / Halttunen	Toyota GR Yaris Rally1	13:14.2	Rovanperä / Halttunen
SS3	Evans / Martin	Toyota GR Yaris Rally1	6:08.0	Rovanperä / Halttunen
SS4	Rovanperä / Halttunen	Toyota GR Yaris Rally1	5:11.2	Rovanperä / Halttunen
SS5	Rovanperä / Halttunen	Toyota GR Yaris Rally1	13:00.9	Rovanperä / Halttunen
SS6	Rovanperä / Halttunen	Toyota GR Yaris Rally1	13:32.8	Rovanperä / Halttunen
SS7	Rovanperä / Halttunen	Toyota GR Yaris Rally1	6:10.5	Rovanperä / Halttunen
SS8	Neuville / Wydaeghe	Hyundai i20 N Rally1	6:11.8	Rovanperä / Halttunen
SS9	Evans / Martin	Toyota GR Yaris Rally1	13:39.8	Rovanperä / Halttunen
SS10	Lappi / Ferm	Toyota GR Yaris Rally1	5:52.8	Rovanperä / Halttunen
SS11	Tänak / Järveoja	Hyundai i20 N Rally1	9:57.9	Rovanperä / Halttunen
SS12	Neuville / Wydaeghe	Hyundai i20 N Rally1	4:39.9	Rovanperä / Halttunen
SS13	Lappi / Ferm	Toyota GR Yaris Rally1	13:19.8	Rovanperä / Halttunen
SS14	Lappi / Ferm	Toyota GR Yaris Rally1	5:43.6	Rovanperä / Halttunen
SS15	Stage cancelled			
SS16	Rovanperä / Halttunen	Toyota GR Yaris Rally1	4:36.0	Rovanperä / Halttunen
SS17	Lappi / Ferm	Toyota GR Yaris Rally1	7:05.8	Rovanperä / Halttunen
SS18	Neuville / Wydaeghe	Hyundai i20 N Rally1	8:25.8	Rovanperä / Halttunen
SS19	Tänak / Järveoja	Hyundai i20 N Rally1	8:15.5	Tänak / Järveoja
SS20	Rovanperä / Halttunen	Toyota GR Yaris Rally1	9:01.8	Rovanperä / Halttunen

==== Championship standings ====
Pos.	Drivers' championships			Co-drivers' championships			Manufacturers' championships		
Pos.	Move	Driver	Points	Move	Co-driver	Points	Move	Manufacturer	Points
1		Kalle Rovanperä	76		Jonne Halttunen	76		Toyota Gazoo Racing WRT	126
2		Thierry Neuville	47		Martijn Wydaeghe	47	1	Hyundai Shell Mobis WRT	84
3	4	Craig Breen	30	4	Paul Nagle	30	1	M-Sport Ford WRT	79
4	1	Sébastien Loeb	27	1	Isabelle Galmiche	27		Toyota Gazoo Racing WRT NG	30
5	4	Ott Tänak	27	4	Martin Järveoja	27			

=== WRC-2 Rally2 ===
==== Classification ====
Position		No.	Driver	Co-driver	Entrant	Car	Time	Difference	Points		
Event	Class	No.	Driver	Co-driver	Entrant	Car	Time	Difference	Class	Stage	Event
7	1	21	Yohan Rossel	Valentin Sarreaud	PH Sport	Citroën C3 Rally2	2:58:22.5	0.0	25	0	6
8	2	24	Kajetan Kajetanowicz	Maciej Szczepaniak	Kajetan Kajetanowicz	Škoda Fabia Rally2 evo	2:59:22.7	+1:00.2	18	0	4
9	3	26	Emil Lindholm	Reeta Hämäläinen	Toksport WRT 2	Škoda Fabia Rally2 evo	2:59:33.4	+1:10.9	15	3	2+1
10	4	23	Nikolay Gryazin	Konstantin Aleksandrov	Toksport WRT 2	Škoda Fabia Rally2 evo	3:00:10.0	+1:47.5	12	0	1
11	5	29	Chris Ingram	Craig Drew	Chris Ingram	Škoda Fabia Rally2 evo	3:00:55.2	+2:32.7	10	0	0
12	6	20	Stéphane Lefebvre	Andy Malfoy	DG Sport Compétition	Citroën C3 Rally2	3:01:40.5	+3:18.0	8	2	0
13	7	22	Eric Camilli	Thibault de la Haye	Saintéloc Junior Team	Citroën C3 Rally2	3:01:43.4	+3:20.9	6	0	0
14	8	25	Erik Cais	Petr Těšínský	Yacco ACCR Team	Ford Fiesta Rally2	3:04:25.3	+6:02.8	4	0	0
16	9	43	Mikołaj Marczyk	Szymon Gospodarczyk	Mikołaj Marczyk	Škoda Fabia Rally2 evo	3:07:20.7	+8:58.2	2	0	0
18	10	31	Mikko Heikkilä	Samu Vaaleri	Mikko Heikkilä	Škoda Fabia Rally2 evo	3:08:22.0	+9:59.5	1	0	0
19	11	32	Sean Johnston	Alexander Kihurani	Saintéloc Junior Team	Citroën C3 Rally2	3:08:45.1	+10:22.6	0	0	0
20	12	35	Armin Kremer	Timo Gottschalk	Armin Kremer	Škoda Fabia Rally2 evo	3:11:11.8	+12:49.3	0	0	0
23	13	34	Benito Guerra	Daniel Cué	Benito Guerra	Škoda Fabia Rally2 evo	3:12:58.2	+14:35.7	0	0	0
24	14	37	Mauro Miele	Luca Beltrame	Mauro Miele	Škoda Fabia Rally2 evo	3:13:08.2	+14:45.7	0	0	0
25	15	39	Olivier Burri	Anderson Levratti	Olivier Burri	Volkswagen Polo GTI R5	3:16:06.0	+17:43.5	0	0	0
26	16	38	Pierre Ragues	Julien Pesenti	Yacco ACCR Team	Volkswagen Polo GTI R5	3:17:09.4	+18:46.9	0	0	0
27	17	47	Aljoša Novak	Uroš Ocvirk	Aljoša Novak	Škoda Fabia Rally2 evo	3:20:11.3	+21:48.8	0	0	0
28	18	27	Jari Huttunen	Mikko Lukka	M-Sport Ford WRT	Ford Fiesta Rally2	3:20:23.4	+22:00.9	0	0	0
33	19	35	Neil Simpson	Michael Gibson	Neil Simpson	Škoda Fabia Rally2 evo	3:30:06.0	+31:43.5	0	0	0
36	20	40	Niko Pulić	Aleksandra Kovačić	Niko Pulić	Škoda Fabia Rally2 evo	3:33:44.3	+35:21.8	0	0	0
37	21	30	Georg Linnamäe	James Morgan	ALM Motorsport	Volkswagen Polo GTI R5	3:34:22.6	+36:00.1	0	0	0
38	22	45	Fabrizio Arengi	Massimiliano Bosi	Fabrizio Arengi	Škoda Fabia Rally2 evo	3:34:33.0	+36:10.5	0	0	0
44	23	51	Filippo Marchino	Roberto Briani	Filippo Marchino	Škoda Fabia R5	3:47:02.0	+48:39.5	0	0	0
46	24	46	Henk Vossen	Hans van Goor	Henk Vossen	Ford Fiesta R5	3:52:25.7	+54:03.2	0	0	0
48	25	28	Grégoire Munster	Louis Louka	Grégoire Munster	Hyundai i20 N Rally2	4:01:05.3	+1:02:42.8	0	1	0
53	26	49	Osamu Fukunaga	Misako Saida	Osamu Fukunaga	Škoda Fabia Rally2 evo	4:29:49.9	+1:31:27.4	0	0	0
54	27	50	Carlo Covi	Michela Lorigiola	Carlo Covi	Škoda Fabia R5	4:32:30.9	+1:34:08.4	0	0	0
Retired SS18		41	Johannes Keferböck	Ilka Minor	Johannes Keferböck	Škoda Fabia Rally2 evo	Fuel pump		0	0	0

==== Special stages ====
Stage	Open Championship				Junior Championship				Masters Cup			
Stage	Winners	Car	Time	Class leaders	Winners	Car	Time	Class leaders	Winners	Car	Time	Class leaders
SD	Lefebvre / Malfoy	Citroën C3 Rally2	1:59.7	—N/a	Gryazin / Aleksandrov	Škoda Fabia Rally2 evo	2:00.9	—N/a	Kremer / Gottschalk	Škoda Fabia Rally2 evo	2:06.8	—N/a
SS1	Rossel / Sarreaud	Citroën C3 Rally2	13:45.6	Rossel / Sarreaud	Ingram / Drew	Škoda Fabia Rally2 evo	13:54.3	Ingram / Drew	Kremer / Gottschalk	Škoda Fabia Rally2 evo	14:44.8	Kremer / Gottschalk
SS2	Rossel / Sarreaud	Citroën C3 Rally2	14:16.7	Rossel / Sarreaud	Ingram / Drew	Škoda Fabia Rally2 evo	14:21.3	Ingram / Drew	Miele / Beltrame	Škoda Fabia Rally2 evo	15:04.4	Kremer / Gottschalk
SS3	Rossel / Sarreaud	Citroën C3 Rally2	6:28.3	Rossel / Sarreaud	Gryazin / Aleksandrov	Škoda Fabia Rally2 evo	6:31.2	Ingram / Drew	Kremer / Gottschalk	Škoda Fabia Rally2 evo	6:48.6	Kremer / Gottschalk
SS4	Lefebvre / Malfoy	Citroën C3 Rally2	5:36.8	Rossel / Sarreaud	Gryazin / Aleksandrov	Škoda Fabia Rally2 evo	5:41.2	Ingram / Drew	Kremer / Gottschalk	Škoda Fabia Rally2 evo	5:59.2	Kremer / Gottschalk
SS5	Huttunen / Lukka	Ford Fiesta Rally2	13:45.3	Rossel / Sarreaud	Gryazin / Aleksandrov	Škoda Fabia Rally2 evo	13:49.5	Gryazin / Aleksandrov	Miele / Beltrame	Škoda Fabia Rally2 evo	14:58.6	Kremer / Gottschalk
SS6	Camilli / de la Haye	Citroën C3 Rally2	14:09.6	Rossel / Sarreaud	Lindholm / Hämäläinen	Škoda Fabia Rally2 evo	14:18.7	Gryazin / Aleksandrov	Kremer / Gottschalk	Škoda Fabia Rally2 evo	14:43.7	Kremer / Gottschalk
SS7	Camilli / de la Haye	Citroën C3 Rally2	6:34.6	Rossel / Sarreaud	Gryazin / Aleksandrov	Škoda Fabia Rally2 evo	6:35.4	Gryazin / Aleksandrov	Kremer / Gottschalk	Škoda Fabia Rally2 evo	6:57.1	Kremer / Gottschalk
SS8	Lefebvre / Malfoy	Citroën C3 Rally2	5:47.4	Rossel / Sarreaud	Gryazin / Aleksandrov	Škoda Fabia Rally2 evo	5:49.9	Gryazin / Aleksandrov	Kremer / Gottschalk	Škoda Fabia Rally2 evo	6:08.6	Kremer / Gottschalk
SS9	Stage cancelled											
SS10	Gryazin / Aleksandrov	Škoda Fabia Rally2 evo	6:18.8	Rossel / Sarreaud	Gryazin / Aleksandrov	Škoda Fabia Rally2 evo	6:18.8	Gryazin / Aleksandrov	Kremer / Gottschalk	Škoda Fabia Rally2 evo	6:55.9	Kremer / Gottschalk
SS11	Lefebvre / Malfoy	Citroën C3 Rally2	10:30.1	Rossel / Sarreaud	Lindholm / Hämäläinen	Škoda Fabia Rally2 evo	10:54.9	Gryazin / Aleksandrov	Miele / Beltrame	Škoda Fabia Rally2 evo	11:15.1	Kremer / Gottschalk
SS12	Kajetanowicz / Szczepaniak	Škoda Fabia Rally2 evo	4:59.5	Rossel / Sarreaud	Lindholm / Hämäläinen	Škoda Fabia Rally2 evo	5:01.9	Gryazin / Aleksandrov	Kremer / Gottschalk	Škoda Fabia Rally2 evo	5:16.4	Kremer / Gottschalk
SS13	Kajetanowicz / Szczepaniak	Škoda Fabia Rally2 evo	14:16.2	Rossel / Sarreaud	Lindholm / Hämäläinen	Škoda Fabia Rally2 evo	14:17.4	Gryazin / Aleksandrov	Kremer / Gottschalk	Škoda Fabia Rally2 evo	15:15.7	Kremer / Gottschalk
SS14	Lefebvre / Malfoy	Citroën C3 Rally2	6:10.7	Rossel / Sarreaud	Gryazin / Aleksandrov	Škoda Fabia Rally2 evo	6:10.8	Gryazin / Aleksandrov	Kremer / Gottschalk	Škoda Fabia Rally2 evo	6:36.0	Kremer / Gottschalk
SS15	Stage cancelled											
SS16	Kajetanowicz / Szczepaniak	Škoda Fabia Rally2 evo	4:57.6	Rossel / Sarreaud	Gryazin / Aleksandrov	Škoda Fabia Rally2 evo	4:58.4	Gryazin / Aleksandrov	Kremer / Gottschalk	Škoda Fabia Rally2 evo	5:17.0	Kremer / Gottschalk
SS17	Camilli / de la Haye	Citroën C3 Rally2	7:40.0	Rossel / Sarreaud	Ingram / Drew	Škoda Fabia Rally2 evo	7:43.1	Gryazin / Aleksandrov	Miele / Beltrame	Škoda Fabia Rally2 evo	8:00.3	Kremer / Gottschalk
SS18	Lindholm / Hämäläinen	Škoda Fabia Rally2 evo	9:01.1	Rossel / Sarreaud	Lindholm / Hämäläinen	Škoda Fabia Rally2 evo	9:01.1	Gryazin / Aleksandrov	Miele / Beltrame	Škoda Fabia Rally2 evo	10:37.6	Kremer / Gottschalk
SS19	Lindholm / Hämäläinen	Škoda Fabia Rally2 evo	8:15.5	Rossel / Sarreaud	Lindholm / Hämäläinen	Škoda Fabia Rally2 evo	8:31.8	Lindholm / Hämäläinen	Miele / Beltrame	Škoda Fabia Rally2 evo	8:53.7	Kremer / Gottschalk
SS20	Lindholm / Hämäläinen	Škoda Fabia Rally2 evo	9:27.6	Rossel / Sarreaud	Lindholm / Hämäläinen	Škoda Fabia Rally2 evo	9:27.6	Lindholm / Hämäläinen	Miele / Beltrame	Škoda Fabia Rally2 evo	10:28.1	Kremer / Gottschalk

==== Championship standings ====
Pos.	Open Drivers' championships			Open Co-drivers' championships			Teams' championships			Junior Drivers' championships			Junior Co-drivers' championships			Driver Masters' championships			Co-driver Masters' championships		
Pos.	Move	Driver	Points	Move	Co-driver	Points	Move	Manufacturer	Points	Move	Manufacturer	Points	Move	Driver	Points	Move	Driver	Points	Move	Driver	Points
1		Andreas Mikkelsen	51		Torstein Eriksen	51	1	Toksport WRT	62		Erik Cais	37		Louis Louka	43		Mauro Miele	61	1	Michael Joseph Morrissey	36
2	8	Yohan Rossel	36	2	Konstantin Aleksandrov	27	3	Toksport WRT 2	58	1	Nikolay Gryazin	36	New entry	Elia De Guio	25	2	Olivier Burri	33	3	Michela Lorigiola	30
3	1	Nikolay Gryazin	27	New entry	Valentin Sarreaud	25	1	Yaco ACCR Team	50	7	Emil Lindholm	33	New entry	Samu Vaaleri	25	1	Michał Sołowow	25	1	Laurent Magat	25
4	2	Erik Cais	22	2	Petr Těšínský	22		Saintéloc Junior Team	40	2	Georg Linnamäe	29	1	James Fulton	18	New entry	Armin Kremer	25	1	Jörgen Fornander	25
5	11	Emil Lindholm	15	11	Reeta Hämäläinen	15	2	M-Sport Ford WRT	18	2	Chris Ingram	27				2	Eamonn Boland	22	New entry	Hans van Goor	25

=== WRC-3 Rally3 ===
==== Classification ====
Position		No.	Driver	Co-driver	Entrant	Car	Time	Difference	Points		
Event	Class	No.	Driver	Co-driver	Entrant	Car	Time	Difference	Open	Junior	Stage
17	1	53	Lauri Joona	Mikael Korhonen	Lauri Joona	Ford Fiesta Rally3	3:07:24.9	0.0	—N/a	25	1
21	2	57	Robert Virves	Aleks Lesk	Starter Energy Racing	Ford Fiesta Rally3	3:11:32.6	+4:07.7	—N/a	18	3
22	3	58	Jean-Baptiste Franceschi	Anthony Gorguilo	Jean-Baptiste Franceschi	Ford Fiesta Rally3	3:12:53.5	+5:28.6	—N/a	15	0
34	4	60	Zoltán László	Tamás Kürti	Zoltán László	Ford Fiesta Rally3	3:32:47.0	+25:22.1	25	—N/a	—N/a
35	5	59	Enrico Brazzoli	Manuel Fenoli	Enrico Brazzoli	Ford Fiesta Rally3	3:33:22.6	+25:57.7	18	—N/a	—N/a
40	6	61	Ivica Siladić	Jasna Durak	Ivica Siladić	Ford Fiesta Rally3	3:38:21.3	+30:56.4	15	—N/a	—N/a
51	7	52	Jon Armstrong	Brian Hoy	Jon Armstrong	Ford Fiesta Rally3	4:17:55.0	+1:10:30.1	—N/a	12	5
52	8	56	William Creighton	Liam Regan	Motorsport Ireland Rally Academy	Ford Fiesta Rally3	4:20:20.5	+1:12:55.6	12	10	1
Retired SS20		62	McRae Kimathi	Mwangi Kioni	McRae Kimathi	Ford Fiesta Rally3	Withdrawn		0	0	0
Retired SS18		54	Sami Pajari	Enni Mälkönen	Sami Pajari	Ford Fiesta Rally3	Crash		—N/a	0	8
Did not start		55	Jan Černý	Petr Jindra	Jan Černý	Ford Fiesta Rally3	Withdrawn		0	—N/a	—N/a

==== Special stages ====
Stage	Open Championship				Junior Championship			
Stage	Winners	Car	Time	Class leaders	Winners	Car	Time	Class leaders
SD	Creighton / Regan	Ford Fiesta Rally3	2:06.2	—N/a	Franceschi / Gorguilo	Ford Fiesta Rally3	2:05.2	—N/a
SS1	Pajari / Mälkönen	Ford Fiesta Rally3	14:51.5	Pajari / Mälkönen	Joona / Korhonen	Ford Fiesta Rally3	14:31.6	Joona / Korhonen
SS2	Pajari / Mälkönen	Ford Fiesta Rally3	15:08.2	Pajari / Mälkönen	Armstrong / Hoy	Ford Fiesta Rally3	14:30.1	Armstrong / Hoy
SS3	Pajari / Mälkönen	Ford Fiesta Rally3	6:47.9	Pajari / Mälkönen	Pajari / Mälkönen	Ford Fiesta Rally3	6:47.9	Armstrong / Hoy
SS4	Pajari / Mälkönen	Ford Fiesta Rally3	5:52.3	Pajari / Mälkönen	Armstrong / Hoy	Ford Fiesta Rally3	5:46.9	Armstrong / Hoy
SS5	Pajari / Mälkönen	Ford Fiesta Rally3	14:12.5	Pajari / Mälkönen	Pajari / Mälkönen	Ford Fiesta Rally3	14:12.5	Virves / Lesk
SS6	Pajari / Mälkönen	Ford Fiesta Rally3	14:37.9	Pajari / Mälkönen	Pajari / Mälkönen	Ford Fiesta Rally3	14:37.9	Virves / Lesk
SS7	Pajari / Mälkönen	Ford Fiesta Rally3	6:56.1	Pajari / Mälkönen	Pajari / Mälkönen	Ford Fiesta Rally3	6:56.1	Virves / Lesk
SS8	Pajari / Mälkönen	Ford Fiesta Rally3	6:05.6	Pajari / Mälkönen	Pajari / Mälkönen	Ford Fiesta Rally3	6:05.6	Virves / Lesk
SS9	Stage cancelled							
SS10	Pajari / Mälkönen	Ford Fiesta Rally3	6:39.0	Pajari / Mälkönen	Armstrong / Hoy	Ford Fiesta Rally3	6:33.9	Pajari / Mälkönen
SS11	Pajari / Mälkönen	Ford Fiesta Rally3	10:39.2	Pajari / Mälkönen	Pajari / Mälkönen	Ford Fiesta Rally3	10:39.2	Pajari / Mälkönen
SS12	Pajari / Mälkönen	Ford Fiesta Rally3	5:12.5	Pajari / Mälkönen	Virves / Lesk	Ford Fiesta Rally3	5:11.2	Pajari / Mälkönen
SS13	Pajari / Mälkönen	Ford Fiesta Rally3	14:58.0	Pajari / Mälkönen	Virves / Lesk	Ford Fiesta Rally3	14:55.6	Pajari / Mälkönen
SS14	Pajari / Mälkönen	Ford Fiesta Rally3	6:17.2	Pajari / Mälkönen	Pajari / Mälkönen	Ford Fiesta Rally3	6:17.2	Pajari / Mälkönen
SS15	Stage cancelled							
SS16	Pajari / Mälkönen	Ford Fiesta Rally3	5:08.5	Pajari / Mälkönen	Pajari / Mälkönen	Ford Fiesta Rally3	5:08.5	Pajari / Mälkönen
SS17	Pajari / Mälkönen	Ford Fiesta Rally3	8:07.8	Pajari / Mälkönen	Virves / Lesk	Ford Fiesta Rally3	7:53.3	Pajari / Mälkönen
SS18	Creighton / Regan	Ford Fiesta Rally3	10:27.5	Creighton / Regan	Armstrong / Hoy	Ford Fiesta Rally3	10:21.6	Pajari / Mälkönen
SS19	Creighton / Regan	Ford Fiesta Rally3	8:53.4	László / Kürti	Creighton / Regan	Ford Fiesta Rally3	8:53.4	Virves / Lesk
SS20	Creighton / Regan	Ford Fiesta Rally3	10:51.5	László / Kürti	Armstrong / Hoy	Ford Fiesta Rally3	9:55.9	Joona / Korhonen

==== Championship standings ====
Pos.	Open Drivers' championships			Open Co-drivers' championships			Junior Drivers' championships			Junior Co-drivers' championships		
Pos.	Move	Driver	Points	Move	Co-driver	Points	Move	Manufacturer	Points	Move	Manufacturer	Points
1		Sami Pajari	37		Enni Mälkönen	37	1	Lauri Joona	47	1	Mikael Korhonen	47
2	3	Enrico Brazzoli	33	3	Manuel Fenoli	33	1	Jon Armstrong	47	1	Brian Hoy	47
3	1	William Creighton	30	1	Liam Regan	30	3	Robert Virves	29	3	Aleks Lesk	29
4	3	Zoltán László	25	3	Tamás Kürti	25		William Creighton	27		Liam Regan	27
5		Lauri Joona	25		Mikael Korhonen	25	2	Sami Pajari	25	2	Enni Mälkönen	25

== Notes ==
Previous rally: 2022 Rally Sweden	2022 FIA World Rally Championship	Next rally: 2022 Rally de Portugal
Previous rally: 2021 Croatia Rally	2022 Croatia Rally	Next rally: 2023 Croatia Rally
