= Torstein Eriksen =

Norwegian rally co-driver (born 1990)

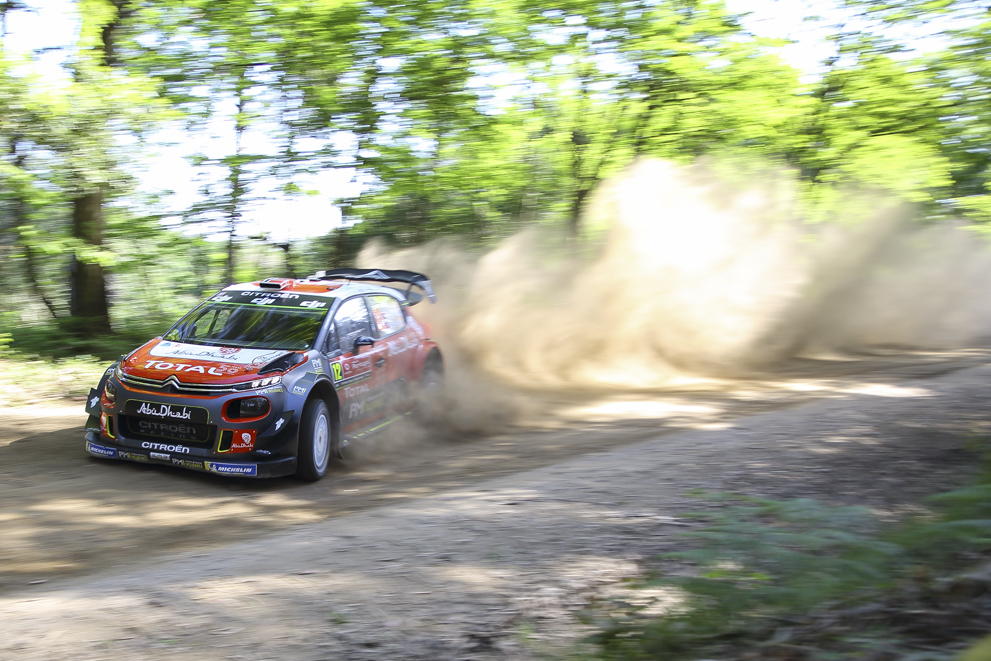

Personal information
- Nationality: (Norway) Norwegian
- Born: April 29, 1990 (age 36)

World Rally Championship record
- Years active: 2011–2012, 2015, 2017–2024
- Driver: (Norway) Frank Tore Larsen (Norway) Mads Østberg (Norway) Andreas Mikkelsen (Norway) Ole Christian Veiby
- Teams: Ford, Citroën, Hyundai
- Rallies: 53
- Championships: 0
- Rally wins: 0
- Podiums: 2
- Stage wins: 10
- Total points: 202
- First rally: 2011 Rally Finland
- Last rally: 2024 Rally Japan

Torstein Eriksen (born 29 April 1990) is a rallying co-driver from Norway. He is currently teamed with Andreas Mikkelsen and is competing for Toksport WRT in the World Rally Championship-2.

== Rally career ==
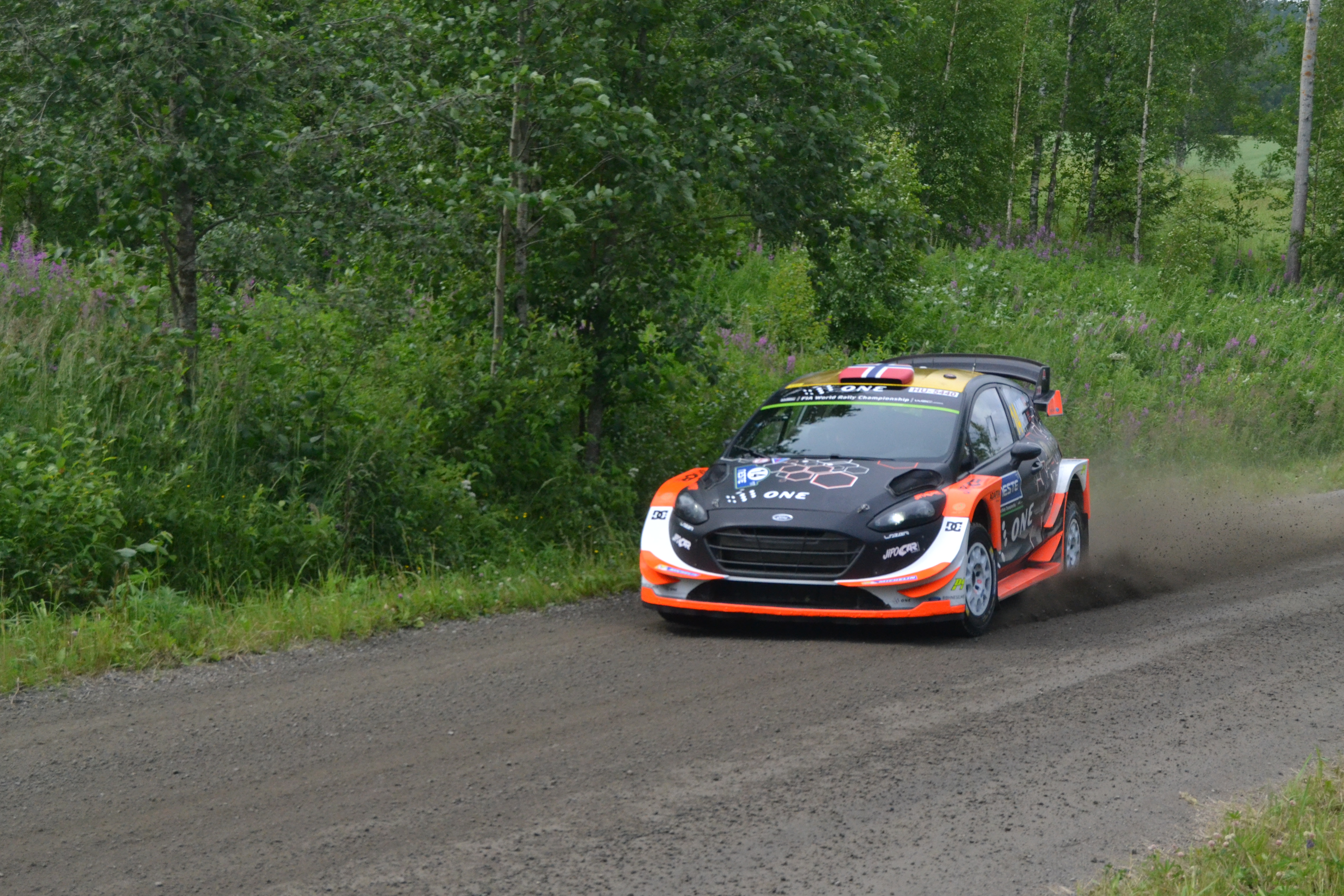
Mads Østberg and Torstein Eriksen in a Ford Fiesta WRC.

Eriksen began his rally career in 2009, co-driving for Frank Tore Larsen. In 2011 Rally Finland, he made his WRC debut but retired from the rally due to mechanical issue.

In the 2017 Rally Finland and 2017 Rally Catalunya, Eriksen partnered Mads Østberg and scored his first WRC points in Finland, where they finished tenth.

In 2018, the Norwegian crew were signed by Citroën for selected events. In the 2018 Rally Finland, Eriksen achieved his first WRC podium where he finished second overall in a Citroën C3 WRC.

== Results ==
=== WRC results ===
Year	Entrant	Car	1	2	3	4	5	6	7	8	9	10	11	12	13	14	WDC	Points
2011	Frank Tore Larsen	Ford Fiesta R2	SWE	MEX	POR	JOR	ITA	ARG	GRE	FIN; Ret	GER	AUS	FRA	ESP	GBR		NC	0
2012	Frank Tore Larsen	Ford Fiesta R2	MON	SWE; 30	MEX	POR	ARG	GRE	NZL	FIN; 32	GER	GBR	FRA	ITA	ESP		NC	0
2015	Frank Tore Larsen	Ford Fiesta R2	MON	SWE; Ret	MEX	ARG	POR	ITA	POL	FIN	GER	AUS	FRA	ESP	GBR		NC	0
2017	M-Sport	Ford Fiesta WRC	MON	SWE	MEX	FRA	ARG	POR	ITA	POL	FIN; 10	GER	ESP; 5	GBR	AUS		17th	11
2018	Citroën Total Abu Dhabi WRT	Citroën C3 WRC	MON	SWE; 6	MEX	FRA	ARG	POR; 6	ITA; 5	FIN; 2	GER; Ret	TUR; 23	GBR; 8	ESP	AUS; 3		9th	70
2019	Citroën Total WRT	Citroën C3 R5	MON	SWE; 11	MEX	FRA	ARG; 9	CHL; 9	POR; 24	ITA; 18	FIN	GER; 17	TUR	GBR; 45	ESP; 9		19th	6
2019	Citroën Total WRT	Citroën C3 WRC														AUS; C	19th	6
2020	PH Sport	Citroën C3 R5	MON; 10	SWE; 12	MEX	EST; 10	TUR	ITA; 14	MNZ; 9								21st	4
2021	TRT World Rally Team	Citroën C3 R5	MON	ARC	CRO; 9	POR; 9	ITA; 6	KEN	EST; 10	BEL	GRE; 31	FIN; 9	ESP; 15	MNZ			16th	15
2022	Toksport WRT	Škoda Fabia Rally2 evo	MON; 7	SWE; 7	CRO	POR; Ret	ITA; Ret	KEN	EST; 8	FIN	BEL; 7	GRE; 13	NZL	ESP	JPN		14th	25
2023	Toksport WRT 3	Škoda Fabia RS Rally2	MON	SWE	MEX	CRO	POR; 8	ITA; 5	KEN	EST; 9	FIN; 10	GRE; 7	CHL	EUR; 23	JPN; 7		11th	31
2024	Hyundai Shell Mobis WRT	Hyundai i20 N Rally1	MON; 6	SWE	KEN	CRO; 6	POR	ITA	POL; 6	LAT	FIN	GRE	CHL	EUR; 31	JPN; 31		11th	40
