= McRae Kimathi =

Kenyan rally driver (born 1995)

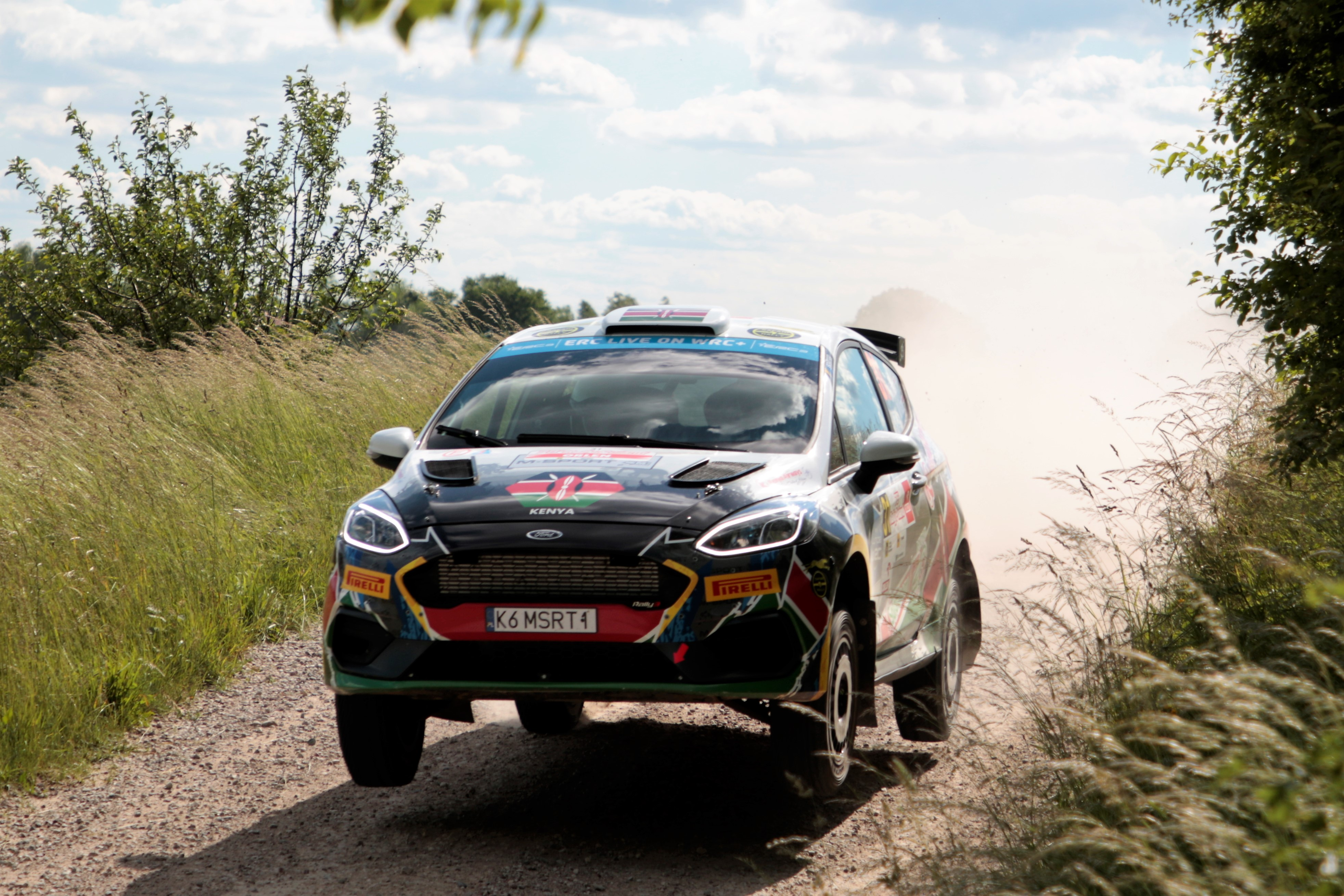
- Kimathi competing at 2022 Rally Poland in a Ford Fiesta Rally3
- Nationality: Kenyan
- Born: 4 January 1995 (age 31)

Awards
- 2021: 2021 Junior African Rally Championship Winner

McRae Kimathi (born 4 January 1995) is a Kenyan rally driver who participates in local and international events.

Named after Scottish rally driver and 1995 WRC champion Colin McRae, Kimathi made his FIA WRC Championship debut at the Junior WRC 2022 Rally Sweden. Co-driven by Mwangi Kioni, he finished fourth.

Kimathi started rallying in 2016 and has participated in the 2022 European Rally Championship, 2022 Rally de Portugal, 2022 World Rally Championship-3, and 2022 Croatia Rally.

Kimathi is the son of former Kenyan rally driver Phineas Kimathi.
