= Kroksjö, Lycksele Municipality =

Village in Lycksele Municipality, Sweden

Kroksjö
- Coordinates: 64°30′35″N 17°58′47″E
- Country: Sweden
- Municipality: Lycksele

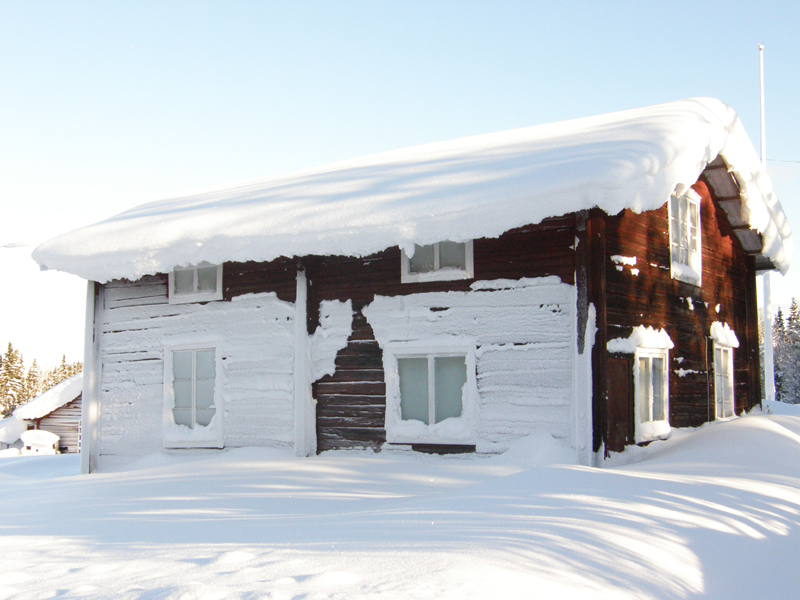
The house where the Post Office in Kroksjö was located in the 1950s.

Kroksjö is a village of about fifty houses located in Lycksele Municipality, Sweden, about forty kilometres west of Lycksele.
