= Kroksjö, Umeå Municipality =

Town in Umeå Municipality, Sweden

Kroksjö
- Coordinates: 64°04′59″N 20°11′15″E
- Country: Sweden
- Municipality: Umeå

Kroksjö is a small town in Umeå Municipality, Sweden. The resort is located along County Road 364 on Lake Kroksjön, about 3 km north of Umeå.
