= Norbert Maior =

Romanian rally driver

- Nationality: Romanian
- Born: July 27, 1998 (age 28) Brașov, Romania
- Co-driver: Francesca Maior

Championship titles
- 2023: European Rally Championship - Junior ERC

Norbert Maior (born 27 July 1998) is a Romanian rally driver. He won the 2023 Junior World Rally Championship.

== Results ==
=== European Rally Championship results ===
==== ERC-3 Junior results ====
Year	Entrant	Car	1	2	3	4	5	6	Pos.	Points
2021	Topp-Cars Rally Team	Peugeot 208 Rally4	POL; 2	LAT; 7	ITA; Ret	CZE; 2	HUN; Ret	ESP	5th	85

==== ERC-3 results ====
Year	Entrant	Car	1	2	3	4	5	6	7	8	Pos.	Points
2021	Topp-Cars Rally Team	Peugeot 208 Rally4	POL; 4	LAT; 13	ITA; Ret	CZE; 3	POR	POR	HUN; Ret	ESP	8th	56

==== ERC-4 Junior results ====
Year	Entrant	Car	1	2	3	4	5	6	Pos.	Points
2022	Sports & You Canarias	Opel Corsa Rally4	ESP; Ret						18th	9
2022	Topp-Cars Rally Team	Peugeot 208 Rally4		POL; 9	LAT	ITA	CZE	ESP	18th	9

==== ERC-4 results ====
Year	Entrant	Car	1	2	3	4	5	6	7	8	Pos.	Points
2022	Sports & You Canarias	Opel Corsa Rally4	POR	POR	ESP; Ret						34th	4
2022	Topp-Cars Rally Team	Peugeot 208 Rally4				POL; 12	LAT	ITA	CZE	ESP	34th	4
2023	Norbert Maior	Peugeot 208 Rally4	POR	ESP	POL; 2	LAT; 3	SWE; 3	ITA; 3	CZE; 5	HUN; 1	2nd	134

==== ERC Junior results ====
Year	Entrant	Car	1	2	3	4	5	6	Pos.	Points
2023	Norbert Maior	Peugeot 208 Rally4	POL; 2	LAT; 3	SWE; 3	ITA; 3	CZE; 4	HUN; 1	1st	136

==== European Rally Championship results ====
Year	Entrant	Car	1	2	3	4	5	6	7	8	Pos.	Points
2025	Norbert Maior	Citroën C3 Rally2	ESP	HUN; 6	SWE	POL	ITA	CZE	GBR	CRO; 8	19th	26

=== World Rally Championship results ===
==== Junior WRC results ====
Year	Entrant	Car	1	2	3	4	5	Pos.	Points
2024	Norbert Maior	Ford Fiesta Rally3	SWE; 9	CRO; 3	ITA; 5	FIN; Ret	GRC; 1	2nd	80

==== WRC3 results ====
Year	Entrant	Car	1	2	3	4	5	6	7	8	9	10	11	12	13	Pos.	Points
2024	Norbert Maior	Ford Fiesta Rally3	MON	SWE; 8	KEN	CRO; 5	POR	ITA; 5	POL	LAT	FIN; Ret	GRC; 1	CHL	EUR	JPN	6th	49
