= 2024 Acropolis Rally =

68th edition of Acropolis Rally

2024 Acropolis Rally EKO Acropolis Rally 2024
Round 10 of 13 in the 2024 World Rally Championship
← Previous event	Next event →
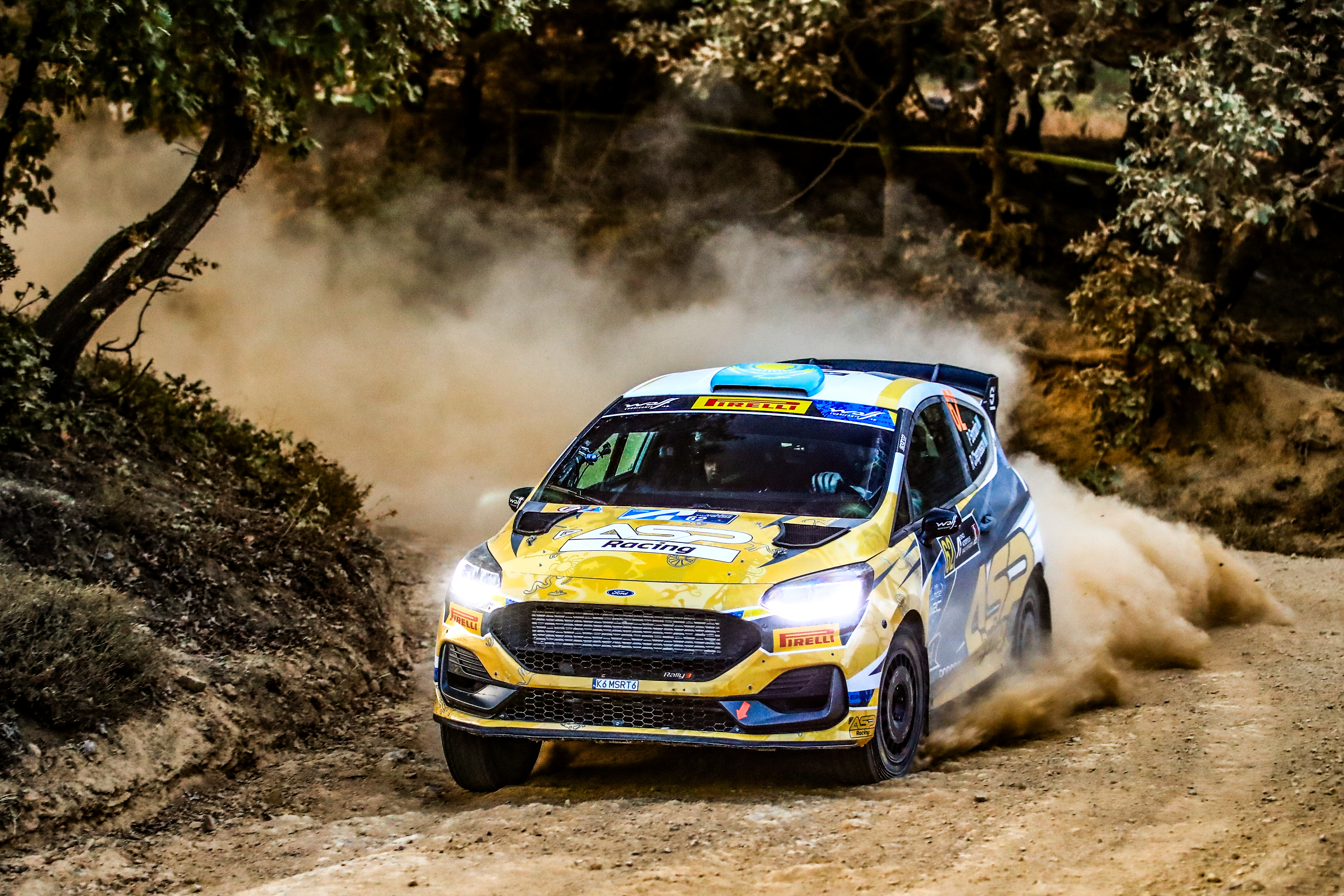
- Twisty gravel mountain roads, high temperatures and choking dust are the challenges of the event.
- Host country: Greece
- Rally base: Lamia, Central Greece
- Dates run: 5 – 8 September 2024
- Start location: Athens, Attica
- Finish location: Eleftherochori, Phthiotis
- Stages: 15 (305.30 km; 189.70 miles)
- Stage surface: Gravel
- Transport distance: 1,086.94 km (675.39 miles)
- Overall distance: 1,392.24 km (865.10 miles)

Statistics
- Crews registered: 72
- Crews: 70 at start, 52 at finish

Overall results
- Overall winner: (Belgium) Thierry Neuville (Belgium) Martijn Wydaeghe (South Korea) Hyundai Shell Mobis WRT; 3:38:04.2
- Saturday Overall leader: (Belgium) Thierry Neuville (Belgium) Martijn Wydaeghe (South Korea) Hyundai Shell Mobis WRT; 3:01:05.3
- Sunday Accumulated leader: (Estonia) Ott Tänak (Estonia) Martin Järveoja (South Korea) Hyundai Shell Mobis WRT; 36:37.0
- Power Stage winner: (France) Adrien Fourmaux (France) Alexandre Coria (United Kingdom) M-Sport Ford WRT; 10:43.8

Support category results
- WRC-2 winner: (Finland) Sami Pajari (Finland) Enni Mälkönen (Finland) Printsport; 3:45:05.3
- WRC-3 winner: (Romania) Norbert Maior (Romania) Francesca Maria Maior; 4:02:05.7
- J-WRC winner: (Romania) Norbert Maior (Romania) Francesca Maria Maior; 4:02:05.7

The 2024 Acropolis Rally (also known as the EKO Acropolis Rally 2024) was a motor racing event for rally cars held over four days from 5 to 8 September 2024. It marked the sixty-eighth running of the Acropolis Rally, and was the tenth round of the 2024 World Rally Championship, World Rally Championship-2 and World Rally Championship-3. The event was also the final round of the 2024 Junior World Rally Championship. The 2024 event was based in Lamia in Central Greece, and was contested over fifteen special stages, covering a total competitive distance of 305.30 km (189.70 mi).

Kalle Rovanperä and Jonne Halttunen were the defending rally winners, and their team, Toyota Gazoo Racing WRT, were the defending manufacturers' winners. Andreas Mikkelsen and Torstein Eriksen were the defending rally winners in the WRC-2 category. Diego Domínguez Jr. and Rogelio Peñate were the defending rally winners in the WRC-3 category, as well as the junior category.

Thierry Neuville and Martijn Wydaeghe won the rally, and their team, Hyundai Shell Mobis WRT, are the manufacturer's winners. Sami Pajari and Enni Mälkönen recorded identical total time with Robert Virves and Aleks Lesk, but Pajari and Mälkönen were the category winners as they were faster in SS1. Norbert Maior and Francesca Maria Maior were the winners in the World Rally Championship-3 category, as well as the junior championship. The Estonian crew of Romet Jürgenson and Siim Oja became the 2024 Junior Rally Champions.

== Background ==
=== Entry list ===
The following crews entered into the rally. The event was opened to crews competing in the World Rally Championship, its support categories, the World Rally Championship-2, World Rally Championship-3 as well as the Junior World Rally Championship, and privateer entries that were not registered to score points in any championship. Nine entered under Rally1 regulations, as were twenty-nine Rally2 crews in the World Rally Championship-2 and nineteen Rally3 crew in the World Rally Championship-3. A total of fourteen crews participated in the Junior World Rally Championship.

Rally1 entries competing in the World Rally Championship
No.	Driver	Co-Driver	Entrant	Car	Championship eligibility	Tyre
6	(Spain) Dani Sordo	(Spain) Cándido Carrera	(South Korea) Hyundai Shell Mobis WRT	Hyundai i20 N Rally1	Driver, Co-driver, Manufacturer	P
8	(Estonia) Ott Tänak	(Estonia) Martin Järveoja	(South Korea) Hyundai Shell Mobis WRT	Hyundai i20 N Rally1	Driver, Co-driver, Manufacturer	P
11	(Belgium) Thierry Neuville	(Belgium) Martijn Wydaeghe	(South Korea) Hyundai Shell Mobis WRT	Hyundai i20 N Rally1	Driver, Co-driver, Manufacturer	P
13	(Luxembourg) Grégoire Munster	(Belgium) Louis Louka	(United Kingdom) M-Sport Ford WRT	Ford Puma Rally1	Driver, Co-driver, Manufacturer	P
16	(France) Adrien Fourmaux	(France) Alexandre Coria	(United Kingdom) M-Sport Ford WRT	Ford Puma Rally1	Driver, Co-driver, Manufacturer	P
17	(France) Sébastien Ogier	(France) Vincent Landais	(Japan) Toyota Gazoo Racing WRT	Toyota GR Yaris Rally1	Driver, Co-driver, Manufacturer	P
18	(Japan) Takamoto Katsuta	(Republic of Ireland) Aaron Johnston	(Japan) Toyota Gazoo Racing WRT	Toyota GR Yaris Rally1	Driver, Co-driver, Manufacturer	P
19	(Greece) Jourdan Serderidis	(Belgium) Frédéric Miclotte	(United Kingdom) M-Sport Ford WRT	Ford Puma Rally1	Driver, Co-driver	P
33	(United Kingdom) Elfyn Evans	(United Kingdom) Scott Martin	(Japan) Toyota Gazoo Racing WRT	Toyota GR Yaris Rally1	Driver, Co-driver, Manufacturer	P

Rally2 entries competing in the World Rally Championship-2
No.	Driver	Co-Driver	Entrant	Car	Championship eligibility	Tyre
20	(Finland) Sami Pajari	(Finland) Enni Mälkönen	(Finland) Printsport	Toyota GR Yaris Rally2	Challenger Driver, Challenger Co-driver	P
21	(France) Yohan Rossel	(France) Florian Barral	(Belgium) DG Sport Compétition	Citroën C3 Rally2	Driver, Co-driver, Team	P
22	(Finland) Lauri Joona	(Finland) Janni Hussi	(Finland) Lauri Joona	Škoda Fabia RS Rally2	Challenger Driver, Challenger Co-driver	P
23	(Bulgaria) Nikolay Gryazin	Konstantin Aleksandrov (Note: Konstantin Aleksandrov is Russian, but he competes as a neutral competitor using the ANA flag as Russian national emblems were banned by the association due to the Russian invasion of Ukraine.)	(Belgium) DG Sport Compétition	Citroën C3 Rally2	Challenger Driver, Challenger Co-driver, Team	P
24	(Spain) Jan Solans	(Spain) Rodrigo Sanjuan de Eusebio	(Spain) Jan Solans	Toyota GR Yaris Rally2	Challenger Driver, Challenger Co-driver	P
25	(Estonia) Georg Linnamäe	(United Kingdom) James Morgan	(Estonia) Georg Linnamäe	Toyota GR Yaris Rally2	Challenger Driver, Challenger Co-driver	P
26	(Republic of Ireland) Josh McErlean	(Republic of Ireland) James Fulton	(Germany) Toksport WRT 2	Škoda Fabia RS Rally2	Challenger Driver, Challenger Co-driver, Team	P
27	(United Kingdom) Gus Greensmith	(Sweden) Jonas Andersson	(Germany) Toksport WRT	Škoda Fabia RS Rally2	Driver, Co-driver	P
28	(Estonia) Robert Virves	(Estonia) Aleks Lesk	(Estonia) Robert Virves	Škoda Fabia RS Rally2	Challenger Driver, Challenger Co-driver	P
29	(Poland) Kajetan Kajetanowicz	(Poland) Maciej Szczepaniak	(Poland) Kajetan Kajetanowicz	Škoda Fabia RS Rally2	Challenger Driver, Challenger Co-driver	P
30	(Paraguay) Fabrizio Zaldivar	(Italy) Marcelo Der Ohannesian	(Paraguay) Fabrizio Zaldivar	Škoda Fabia RS Rally2	Challenger Driver, Challenger Co-driver	P
31	(Czech Republic) Martin Prokop	(Czech Republic) Michal Ernst	(Czech Republic) Martin Prokop	Škoda Fabia RS Rally2	Challenger Driver, Challenger Co-driver	P
32	(Italy) Roberto Daprà	(Italy) Luca Guglielmetti	(Italy) Roberto Daprà	Škoda Fabia Rally2 evo	Challenger Driver, Challenger Co-driver	P
34	(France) Pierre-Louis Loubet	(France) Loris Pascaud	(Germany) Toksport WRT 2	Škoda Fabia RS Rally2	Driver, Co-driver, Team	P
35	(Germany) Armin Kremer	(Germany) Ella Kremer	(Germany) Armin Kremer	Škoda Fabia RS Rally2	Challenger/Masters Driver, Challenger Co-driver	P
36	(Greece) George Vassilakis	(United Kingdom) Tom Krawszik	(Greece) George Vassilakis	Ford Fiesta Rally2	Challenger/Masters Driver, Challenger Co-driver	P
37	(Oman) Hamed Al-Wahaibi	(Republic of Ireland) Niall Burns	(Lebanon) HW34 by Motortune	Škoda Fabia RS Rally2	Challenger Driver, Challenger Co-driver	P
38	(Greece) Lambros Athanassoulas	(Greece) Nikolaos Zakheos	(Greece) Lambros Athanassoulas	Škoda Fabia Rally2 evo	Challenger Driver, Challenger Co-driver	P
39	(Greece) Giorgos Kechagias	(Greece) Nikolaos Petropoulos	(Greece) Giorgos Kechagias	Škoda Fabia RS Rally2	Challenger Driver, Challenger Co-driver	P
40	(Greece) Panagiotis Roustemis	(Greece) Christos Bakloris	(Greece) Panagiotis Roustemis	Škoda Fabia RS Rally2	Challenger Driver, Challenger Co-driver	P
41	(Greece) Vassileios Velanis	(Greece) Elias Panagiotounis	(Greece) Vassileios Velanis	Škoda Fabia RS Rally2	Challenger Driver, Challenger Co-driver	P
43	(Greece) Giorgos Amoutzas	(Greece) Giorgos Eliopoulos	(Greece) Giorgos Amoutzas	Škoda Fabia Rally2 evo	Challenger Driver, Challenger Co-driver	P
44	(Turkey) Uğur Soylu	(Turkey) Sener Guray	(Turkey) Uğur Soylu	Škoda Fabia RS Rally2	Challenger/Masters Driver, Challenger Co-driver	P
45	(Mexico) Miguel Granados	(Spain) Marc Martí	(Mexico) Miguel Granados	Škoda Fabia RS Rally2	Challenger/Masters Driver, Challenger/Masters Co-driver	P
46	(Mexico) Juan Carlos Peralta	(Mexico) Víctor Pérez Couto	(Mexico) Juan Carlos Peralta	Škoda Fabia RS Rally2	Challenger Driver, Challenger Co-driver	P
47	(Italy) Enrico Brazzoli	(Italy) Martina Musiari	(Italy) Enrico Brazzoli	Škoda Fabia Rally2 evo	Challenger/Masters Driver, Challenger Co-driver	P
48	(Greece) Nikos Pavlidis	(United Kingdom) Allan Harryman	(Greece) Nikos Pavlidis	Škoda Fabia Rally2 evo	Challenger/Masters Driver, Challenger/Masters Co-driver	P
49	(Turkey) Burcu Çetinkaya	(Italy) Fabrizia Pons	(Germany) Toksport WRT	Škoda Fabia Rally2 evo	Challenger Driver, Challenger Co-driver	P
50	(Romania) Cristian Dolofan	(Romania) Traian Pavel	(Romania) Cristian Dolofan	Citroën C3 Rally2	Challenger Driver, Challenger Co-driver	P

Rally3 entries competing in the World Rally Championship-3 and/or the Junior World Rally Championship
No.	Driver	Co-Driver	Entrant	Car	Class eligibility	Tyre
51	(Greece) Epaminondas Karanikolas	(Greece) Giorgos Kakavas	(Greece) Epaminondas Karanikolas	Ford Fiesta Rally3	WRC-3	P
52	(Greece) Paschalis Chatzimarkos	(Greece) Marios Tsaoussoglou	(Greece) Paschalis Chatzimarkos	Renault Clio Rally3	WRC-3	P
53	(Greece) Efthimios Halkias	(Greece) Nikos Komnos	(Greece) Efthimios Halkias	Renault Clio Rally3	WRC-3	P
54	(Greece) Giorgos Delaportas	(Greece) Evangelos Panaritis	(Greece) Giorgos Delaportas	Ford Fiesta Rally3	WRC-3	P
55	(Greece) Manos Stefanis	(Greece) Konstantinos Stefanis	(Greece) Manos Stefanis	Ford Fiesta Rally3	WRC-3	P
56	(Greece) Stephanos Theocharopoulos	(Greece) Giorgos Kotsalis	(Greece) Stephanos Theocharopoulos	Ford Fiesta Rally3	WRC-3	P
57	(Croatia) Slaven Šekuljica	(Croatia) Damir Petrović	(Croatia) Slaven Šekuljica	Ford Fiesta Rally3	WRC-3	P
58	(Estonia) Romet Jürgenson	(Estonia) Siim Oja	FIA Rally Star	Ford Fiesta Rally3	WRC-3, Junior WRC	P
59	(Australia) Taylor Gill	(Australia) Daniel Brkic	FIA Rally Star	Ford Fiesta Rally3	WRC-3, Junior WRC	P
60	(Paraguay) Diego Dominguez Jr.	(Spain) Rogelio Peñate	(Paraguay) Diego Dominguez Jr.	Ford Fiesta Rally3	Junior WRC	P
61	(Turkey) Ali Türkkan	(Turkey) Burak Erdener	(Turkey) Castrol Ford Team Türkiye	Ford Fiesta Rally3	WRC-3, Junior WRC	P
62	(Kazakhstan) Petr Borodin	(Kazakhstan) Roman Cheprasov	(Kazakhstan) ASP Racing	Ford Fiesta Rally3	WRC-3, Junior WRC	P
63	(Romania) Norbert Maior	(Romania) Francesca Maria Maior	(Romania) Norbert Maior	Ford Fiesta Rally3	WRC-3, Junior WRC	P
64	(Belgium) Tom Rensonnet	(France) Manon Deliot	(Belgium) RACB National Team	Ford Fiesta Rally3	WRC-3, Junior WRC	P
65	(Republic of Ireland) Eamonn Kelly	(Republic of Ireland) Conor Mohan	(Republic of Ireland) Motorsport Ireland Rally Academy	Ford Fiesta Rally3	WRC-3, Junior WRC	P
66	(South Africa) Max Smart	(United Kingdom) Cameron Fair	FIA Rally Star	Ford Fiesta Rally3	WRC-3, Junior WRC	P
67	(Germany) Fabio Schwarz	(Austria) Bernhard Ettel	(Germany) Armin Schwarz Driving Experience	Ford Fiesta Rally3	WRC-3, Junior WRC	P
68	(Peru) Jose Abito Caparo	(Spain) Esther Gutiérrez Porras	FIA Rally Star	Ford Fiesta Rally3	WRC-3, Junior WRC	P
70	(Bolivia) Nataniel Bruun	(Argentina) Pablo Olmos	(Bolivia) Nataniel Bruun	Ford Fiesta Rally3	WRC-3, Junior WRC	P
71	(Peru) Andre Martinez	(Argentina) Fernando Mussano	(Peru) Andre Martinez	Ford Fiesta Rally3	Junior WRC	P
72	(Poland) Hubert Laskowski	(Poland) Michał Kuśnierz	(Poland) Hubert Laskowski	Ford Fiesta Rally3	WRC-3, Junior WRC	P

=== Itinerary ===
All dates and times are EEST (UTC+3).

Date	No.	Time span	Stage name	Distance
5 September	—	After 9:01	Lamia [Shakedown]	3.62 km
5 September		After 17:30	Opening ceremony, Lamia	—N/a
6 September	SS1	After 7:58	Ano Pavliani 1	22.47 km
6 September	SS2	After 9:09	Dafni 1	21.67 km
6 September	SS3	After 11:30	Tarzan 1	23.37 km
6 September		12:42 – 13:16	Regroup, Lamia	—N/a
6 September		13:16 – 13:46	Flexi service A, Lamia	—N/a
6 September	SS4	After 14:29	Ano Pavliani 2	22.47 km
6 September	SS5	After 15:40	Dafni 2	21.67 km
6 September	SS6	After 17:48	Tarzan 2	23.37 km
6 September		19:23 – 20:08	Flexi service B, Lamia	—N/a
7 September	SS7	After 8:16	Rengini	28.67 km
7 September	SS8	After 10:37	Thiva	20.95 km
7 September	SS9	After 13:05	Aghii Theodori 1	25.87 km
7 September		13:53 – 15:03	Regroup, Loutraki	—N/a
7 September		15:03 – 15:18	Tyre fitting zone, Loutraki	—N/a
7 September	SS10	After 15:46	Loutraki	12.90 km
7 September	SS11	After 17:05	Aghii Theodori 2	25.87 km
7 September		20:20 – 21:02	Regroup, Schimatari	—N/a
7 September	SS12	After 21:05	EKO SSS	1.97 km
8 September		6:00 – 6:45	Flexi service C, Lamia	—N/a
8 September	SS13	After 8:59	Inohori	17.47 km
8 September	SS14	After 10:05	Eleftherohori 1	18.29 km
8 September		11:20 – 12:15	Regroup, Lamia	—N/a
8 September		12:15 – 12:30	Flexi service D, Lamia	—N/a
8 September	SS15	After 13:15	Eleftherohori 2 [Power Stage]	18.29 km
8 September		After 14:55	Finish, Lamia	—N/a
8 September		After 16:00	Podium ceremony, Lamia	—N/a

== Report ==
=== WRC Rally1 ===
==== Classification ====
Position		No.	Driver	Co-driver	Entrant	Car	Time	Difference	Points			
Event	Class	No.	Driver	Co-driver	Entrant	Car	Time	Difference	SAT	SUN	WPS	Total
1	1	11	Thierry Neuville	Martijn Wydaeghe	Hyundai Shell Mobis WRT	Hyundai i20 N Rally1	3:38:04.2	0.0	18	4	2	24
2	2	6	Dani Sordo	Cándido Carrera	Hyundai Shell Mobis WRT	Hyundai i20 N Rally1	3:39:51.0	+1:46.8	15	2	0	17
3	3	8	Ott Tänak	Martin Järveoja	Hyundai Shell Mobis WRT	Hyundai i20 N Rally1	3:41:01.5	+2:57.3	10	7	4	21
14	4	19	Jourdan Serderidis	Frédéric Miclotte	M-Sport Ford WRT	Ford Puma Rally1	4:01:10.4	+23:06.2	0	0	0	0
16	5	17	Sébastien Ogier	Vincent Landais	Toyota Gazoo Racing WRT	Toyota GR Yaris Rally1	4:01:48.7	+23:44.5	13	0	0	13
18	6	33	Elfyn Evans	Scott Martin	Toyota Gazoo Racing WRT	Toyota GR Yaris Rally1	4:02:49.7	+24:45.5	0	5	3	8
21	7	16	Adrien Fourmaux	Alexandre Coria	M-Sport Ford WRT	Ford Puma Rally1	4:08:00.9	+29:56.7	0	6	5	11
30	8	18	Takamoto Katsuta	Aaron Johnston	Toyota Gazoo Racing WRT	Toyota GR Yaris Rally1	4:19:26.4	+41:22.2	0	3	1	4
Retired SS9		13	Grégoire Munster	Louis Louka	M-Sport Ford WRT	Ford Puma Rally1	Off-road		0	0	0	0

==== Special stages ====
Stage	Winners	Car	Time	Class leaders
SD	Katsuta / Johnston	Toyota GR Yaris Rally1	2:39.1	—N/a
SS1	Ogier / Landais	Toyota GR Yaris Rally1	16:33.2	Ogier / Landais
SS2	Katsuta / Johnston	Toyota GR Yaris Rally1	16:45.3	Tänak / Järveoja
SS3	Ogier / Landais	Toyota GR Yaris Rally1	17:06.3	Ogier / Landais
SS4	Ogier / Landais	Toyota GR Yaris Rally1	16:11.0	Ogier / Landais
SS5	Tänak / Järveoja	Hyundai i20 N Rally1	16:27.2	Tänak / Järveoja
SS6	Neuville / Wydaeghe	Hyundai i20 N Rally1	16:56.9	Tänak / Järveoja
SS7	Neuville / Wydaeghe	Hyundai i20 N Rally1	17:51.3	Sordo / Carrera
SS8	Ogier / Landais	Toyota GR Yaris Rally1	14:53.9	Sordo / Carrera
SS9	Ogier / Landais	Toyota GR Yaris Rally1	18:14.1	Neuville / Wydaeghe
SS10	Tänak / Järveoja	Hyundai i20 N Rally1	9:07.0	Neuville / Wydaeghe
SS11	Ogier / Landais	Toyota GR Yaris Rally1	17:49.0	Neuville / Wydaeghe
SS12	Neuville / Wydaeghe	Hyundai i20 N Rally1	1:44.6	Neuville / Wydaeghe
SS13	Ogier / Landais	Toyota GR Yaris Rally1	14:00.6	Neuville / Wydaeghe
SS14	Ogier / Landais	Toyota GR Yaris Rally1	11:38.6	Neuville / Wydaeghe
SS15	Fourmaux / Coria	Ford Puma Rally1	10:43.8	Neuville / Wydaeghe

==== Championship standings ====
Pos.	Drivers' championships			Co-drivers' championships			Manufacturers' championships		
Pos.	Move	Driver	Points	Move	Co-driver	Points	Move	Manufacturer	Points
1		Thierry Neuville	192		Martijn Wydaeghe	192		Hyundai Shell Mobis WRT	445
2	1	Ott Tänak	158	1	Martin Järveoja	158		Toyota Gazoo Racing WRT	410
3	1	Sébastien Ogier	154	1	Vincent Landais	154		M-Sport Ford WRT	226
4		Elfyn Evans	140		Scott Martin	140			
5		Adrien Fourmaux	130		Alexandre Coria	130			

=== WRC-2 Rally2 ===
==== Classification ====
Position		No.	Driver	Co-driver	Entrant	Car	Time	Difference	Points	
Event	Class	No.	Driver	Co-driver	Entrant	Car	Time	Difference	Class	Event
4	1	20	Sami Pajari	Enni Mälkönen	Printsport	Toyota GR Yaris Rally2	3:45:05.3	0.0	25	12
5	2	28	Robert Virves	Aleks Lesk	Robert Virves	Škoda Fabia RS Rally2	3:45:05.3	+0.0	18	7
6	3	21	Yohan Rossel	Florian Barral	DG Sport Compétition	Citroën C3 Rally2	3:45:36.1	+30.8	15	4
7	4	29	Kajetan Kajetanowicz	Maciej Szczepaniak	Kajetan Kajetanowicz	Škoda Fabia RS Rally2	3:47:58.2	+2:52.9	12	3
8	5	30	Fabrizio Zaldivar	Marcelo Der Ohannesian	Fabrizio Zaldivar	Škoda Fabia RS Rally2	3:49:32.1	+4:26.8	10	1
9	6	26	Josh McErlean	James Fulton	Toksport WRT 2	Škoda Fabia RS Rally2	3:50:31.4	+5:26.1	8	0
10	7	32	Roberto Daprà	Luca Guglielmetti	Roberto Daprà	Škoda Fabia Rally2 evo	3:51:49.1	+6:43.8	6	0
11	8	24	Jan Solans	Rodrigo Sanjuan de Eusebio	Jan Solans	Toyota GR Yaris Rally2	3:57:26.9	+12:21.6	4	0
12	9	40	Panagiotis Roustemis	Christos Bakloris	Panagiotis Roustemis	Škoda Fabia RS Rally2	3:58:28.2	+13:22.9	2	0
13	10	35	Armin Kremer	Ella Kremer	Armin Kremer	Škoda Fabia RS Rally2	3:59:54.7	+14:49.4	1	0
20	11	45	Miguel Granados	Marc Martí	Miguel Granados	Škoda Fabia RS Rally2	4:05:49.4	+20:44.1	0	0
24	12	44	Uğur Soylu	Sener Guray	Uğur Soylu	Škoda Fabia RS Rally2	4:12:30.1	+27:24.8	0	0
26	13	22	Lauri Joona	Janni Hussi	Lauri Joona	Škoda Fabia RS Rally2	4:15:03.1	+29:57.8	0	0
29	14	46	Juan Carlos Peralta	Víctor Pérez Couto	Juan Carlos Peralta	Škoda Fabia RS Rally2	4:18:53.3	+33:48.0	0	0
33	15	48	Nikos Pavlidis	Allan Harryman	Nikos Pavlidis	Škoda Fabia Rally2 evo	4:23:54.8	+38:49.5	0	0
39	16	36	George Vassilakis	Tom Krawszik	George Vassilakis	Ford Fiesta Rally2	4:27:22.8	+42:17.5	0	0
42	17	50	Cristian Dolofan	Traian Pavel	Cristian Dolofan	Citroën C3 Rally2	4:41:42.1	+56:36.8	0	0
43	18	49	Burcu Çetinkaya	Fabrizia Pons	Toksport WRT	Škoda Fabia Rally2 evo	4:48:24.2	+1:03:18.9	0	0
44	19	25	Georg Linnamäe	James Morgan	Georg Linnamäe	Toyota GR Yaris Rally2	4:51:52.8	+1:06:47.5	0	0
46	20	47	Enrico Brazzoli	Martina Musiari	Enrico Brazzoli	Škoda Fabia Rally2 evo	5:03:27.1	+1:18:21.8	0	0
48	21	23	Nikolay Gryazin	Konstantin Aleksandrov	DG Sport Compétition	Citroën C3 Rally2	5:09:21.9	+1:24:16.6	0	0
Retired SS15		41	Vassileios Velanis	Elias Panagiotounis	Vassileios Velanis	Škoda Fabia RS Rally2	Steering		0	0
Retired SS13		43	Giorgos Amoutzas	Giorgos Eliopoulos	Giorgos Amoutzas	Škoda Fabia Rally2 evo	Engine		0	0
Retired SS12		37	Hamed Al-Wahaibi	Niall Burns	HW34 by Motortune	Škoda Fabia RS Rally2	Engine		0	0
Retired SS11		39	Giorgos Kechagias	Nikolaos Petropoulos	Giorgos Kechagias	Škoda Fabia RS Rally2	Suspension		0	0
Retired SS7		27	Gus Greensmith	Jonas Andersson	Toksport WRT	Škoda Fabia RS Rally2	Mechanical		0	0
Retired SS1		34	Pierre-Louis Loubet	Loris Pascaud	Toksport WRT 2	Škoda Fabia RS Rally2	Accident		0	0
Retired SS1		38	Lambros Athanassoulas	Nikolaos Zakheos	Lambros Athanassoulas	Škoda Fabia Rally2 evo	Accident		0	0

==== Special stages ====
Overall
Stage	Winners	Car	Time	Class leaders
SD	Greensmith / Andersson	Škoda Fabia RS Rally2	2:45.0	—N/a
SS1	Rossel / Barral	Citroën C3 Rally2	16:54.4	Rossel / Barral
SS2	Rossel / Barral	Citroën C3 Rally2	17:08.9	Rossel / Barral
SS3	Rossel / Barral	Citroën C3 Rally2	17:34.9	Rossel / Barral
SS4	Rossel / Barral	Citroën C3 Rally2	16:45.4	Rossel / Barral
SS5	Rossel / Barral	Citroën C3 Rally2	16:49.6	Rossel / Barral
SS6	Virves / Lesk	Škoda Fabia RS Rally2	17:18.5	Virves / Lesk
SS7	Rossel / Barral	Citroën C3 Rally2	18:42.3	Pajari / Mälkönen
SS8	Rossel / Barral	Citroën C3 Rally2	15:21.3	Pajari / Mälkönen
SS9	Pajari / Mälkönen	Toyota GR Yaris Rally2	18:47.0	Pajari / Mälkönen
SS10	Rossel / Barral	Citroën C3 Rally2	9:19.1	Pajari / Mälkönen
SS11	Rossel / Barral	Citroën C3 Rally2	18:24.5	Pajari / Mälkönen
SS12	Kajetanowicz / Szczepaniak	Škoda Fabia RS Rally2	1:48.5	Pajari / Mälkönen
SS13	Gryazin / Aleksandrov	Citroën C3 Rally2	14:30.3	Pajari / Mälkönen
SS14	Rossel / Barral	Citroën C3 Rally2	12:12.1	Pajari / Mälkönen
SS15	Virves / Lesk	Škoda Fabia RS Rally2	11:26.8	Pajari / Mälkönen

Challenger
Stage	Winners	Car	Time	Class leaders
SD	Virves / Lesk	Škoda Fabia RS Rally2	2:46.7	—N/a
SS1	Pajari / Mälkönen	Toyota GR Yaris Rally2	17:02.0	Pajari / Mälkönen
SS2	Joona / Mannisenmäki	Škoda Fabia RS Rally2	17:15.7	Pajari / Mälkönen
SS3	Pajari / Mälkönen	Toyota GR Yaris Rally2	17:43.3	Pajari / Mälkönen
SS4	Virves / Lesk	Škoda Fabia RS Rally2	16:45.5	Pajari / Mälkönen
SS5	Virves / Lesk	Škoda Fabia RS Rally2	16:53.8	Pajari / Mälkönen
SS6	Virves / Lesk	Škoda Fabia RS Rally2	17:18.5	Virves / Lesk
SS7	Linnamäe / Morgan	Toyota GR Yaris Rally2	18:45.4	Pajari / Mälkönen
SS8	Linnamäe / Morgan	Toyota GR Yaris Rally2	15:29.1	Pajari / Mälkönen
SS9	Pajari / Mälkönen	Toyota GR Yaris Rally2	18:47.0	Pajari / Mälkönen
SS10	Joona / Mannisenmäki	Škoda Fabia RS Rally2	9:20.7	Pajari / Mälkönen
SS11	Pajari / Mälkönen	Toyota GR Yaris Rally2	18:29.9	Pajari / Mälkönen
SS12	Kajetanowicz / Szczepaniak	Škoda Fabia RS Rally2	1:48.5	Pajari / Mälkönen
SS13	Gryazin / Aleksandrov	Citroën C3 Rally2	14:30.3	Pajari / Mälkönen
SS14	Virves / Lesk	Škoda Fabia RS Rally2	12:14.4	Pajari / Mälkönen
SS15	Virves / Lesk	Škoda Fabia RS Rally2	11:26.8	Pajari / Mälkönen

==== Championship standings ====
Pos.	Open Drivers' championships			Open Co-drivers' championships			Teams' championships			Challenger Drivers' championships			Challenger Co-drivers' championships		
Pos.	Move	Driver	Points	Move	Co-driver	Points	Move	Manufacturer	Points	Move	Manufacturer	Points	Move	Driver	Points
1		Oliver Solberg	111		Elliott Edmondson	111	1	DG Sport Compétition	209		Sami Pajari	118		Enni Mälkönen	118
2		Sami Pajari	108		Enni Mälkönen	108	1	Toksport WRT	178		Lauri Joona	78		Janni Hussi	78
3		Yohan Rossel	86		Janni Hussi	58		Toyota Gazoo Racing WRT NG	73		Jan Solans	62		Rodrigo Sanjuan de Eusebio	62
4		Lauri Joona	58		Arnaud Dunand	53		Toksport WRT 2	72		Nikolay Gryazin	55		Konstantin Aleksandrov	55
5		Jan Solans	52		Rodrigo Sanjuan de Eusebio	52					Mikko Heikkilä	55		Kristian Temonen	55

=== WRC-3 Rally3 ===
==== Classification ====
Position		No.	Driver	Co-driver	Entrant	Car	Time	Difference	Points
Event	Class	No.	Driver	Co-driver	Entrant	Car	Time	Difference	Points
17	1	63	Norbert Maior	Francesca Maria Maior	Norbert Maior	Ford Fiesta Rally3	4:02:05.7	0.0	25
19	2	58	Romet Jürgenson	Siim Oja	FIA Rally Star	Ford Fiesta Rally3	4:03:11.8	+1:06.1	18
22	3	64	Tom Rensonnet	Manon Deliot	RACB National Team	Ford Fiesta Rally3	4:09:17.1	+7:11.4	15
23	4	68	Jose Abito Caparo	Esther Gutiérrez Porras	FIA Rally Star	Ford Fiesta Rally3	4:12:23.0	+10:17.3	12
25	5	61	Ali Türkkan	Burak Erdener	Castrol Ford Team Türkiye	Ford Fiesta Rally3	4:12:41.1	+10:35.4	10
27	6	70	Nataniel Bruun	Pablo Olmos	Nataniel Bruun	Ford Fiesta Rally3	4:15:21.5	+13:15.8	8
28	7	53	Efthimios Halkias	Nikos Komnos	Efthimios Halkias	Renault Clio Rally3	4:15:44.8	+13:39.1	6
31	8	66	Max Smart	Cameron Fair	FIA Rally Star	Ford Fiesta Rally3	4:19:52.1	+17:46.4	4
32	9	52	Paschalis Chatzimarkos	Marios Tsaoussoglou	Paschalis Chatzimarkos	Renault Clio Rally3	4:19:55.9	+17:50.2	2
34	10	59	Taylor Gill	Daniel Brkic	FIA Rally Star	Ford Fiesta Rally3	4:24:33.2	+22:27.5	1
35	11	55	Manos Stefanis	Konstantinos Stefanis	Manos Stefanis	Ford Fiesta Rally3	4:24:49.2	+22:43.5	0
36	12	56	Stephanos Theocharopoulos	Giorgos Kotsalis	Stephanos Theocharopoulos	Ford Fiesta Rally3	4:25:43.7	+23:38.0	0
37	13	51	Epaminondas Karanikolas	Giorgos Kakavas	Epaminondas Karanikolas	Ford Fiesta Rally3	4:26:29.0	+24:23.3	0
45	14	72	Hubert Laskowski	Michał Kuśnierz	Hubert Laskowski	Ford Fiesta Rally3	4:53:31.8	+51:26.1	0
Retired SS14		62	Petr Borodin	Roman Cheprasov	ASP Racing	Ford Fiesta Rally3	Crash		0
Retired SS13		67	Fabio Schwarz	Bernhard Ettel	Armin Schwarz Driving Experience	Ford Fiesta Rally3	Rolled		0
Retired SS7		57	Slaven Šekuljica	Damir Petrović	Slaven Šekuljica	Ford Fiesta Rally3	Withdrawn		0
Retired SS3		54	Giorgos Delaportas	Evangelos Panaritis	Giorgos Delaportas	Ford Fiesta Rally3	Rolled		0

==== Special stages ====
Stage	Winners	Car	Time	Class leaders
SD	Maior / Maior	Ford Fiesta Rally3	2:56.6	—N/a
SS1	Stage cancelled			
SS2	Türkkan / Erdener	Ford Fiesta Rally3	17:57.5	Türkkan / Erdener
SS3	Jürgenson / Oja	Ford Fiesta Rally3	18:36.1	Maior / Maior
SS4	Türkkan / Erdener	Ford Fiesta Rally3	17:58.0	Jürgenson / Oja
SS5	Türkkan / Erdener	Ford Fiesta Rally3	17:56.9	Jürgenson / Oja
SS6	Maior / Maior	Ford Fiesta Rally3	18:34.1	Maior / Maior
SS7	Jürgenson / Oja	Ford Fiesta Rally3	19:48.3	Jürgenson / Oja
SS8	Türkkan / Erdener	Ford Fiesta Rally3	16:07.8	Jürgenson / Oja
SS9	Borodin / Cheprassov	Ford Fiesta Rally3	20:14.7	Jürgenson / Oja
SS10	Türkkan / Erdener	Ford Fiesta Rally3	9:49.6	Jürgenson / Oja
SS11	Schwarz / Ettel	Ford Fiesta Rally3	19:58.4	Maior / Maior
SS12	Jürgenson / Oja	Ford Fiesta Rally3	1:56.2	Maior / Maior
SS13	Türkkan / Erdener	Ford Fiesta Rally3	15:05.2	Maior / Maior
SS14	Türkkan / Erdener	Ford Fiesta Rally3	12:50.2	Maior / Maior
SS15	Laskowski / Kuśnierz	Ford Fiesta Rally3	12:33.2	Maior / Maior

==== Championship standings ====
Pos.	Drivers' championships			Co-drivers' championships		
Pos.	Move	Driver	Points	Move	Co-driver	Points
1		Diego Dominguez Jr.	75		Rogelio Peñate	75
2	3	Romet Jürgenson	61	3	Siim Oja	61
3	11	Mattéo Chatillon	49	11	Maxence Cornuau	49
4	2	Mattéo Chatillon	48	2	Maxence Cornuau	48
5	2	Jan Černý	47	2	Ondřej Krajča	47

=== J-WRC Rally3 ===
==== Classification ====
Position		No.	Driver	Co-driver	Entrant	Car	Time	Difference	Points	
Event	Class	No.	Driver	Co-driver	Entrant	Car	Time	Difference	Class	Stage
17	1	63	Norbert Maior	Francesca Maria Maior	Norbert Maior	Ford Fiesta Rally3	4:02:05.7	0.0	50	1
19	2	58	Romet Jürgenson	Siim Oja	FIA Rally Star	Ford Fiesta Rally3	4:03:11.8	+1:06.1	36	3
22	3	64	Tom Rensonnet	Manon Deliot	RACB National Team	Ford Fiesta Rally3	4:09:17.1	+7:11.4	30	0
23	4	68	Jose Abito Caparo	Esther Gutiérrez Porras	FIA Rally Star	Ford Fiesta Rally3	4:12:23.0	+10:17.3	24	0
25	5	61	Ali Türkkan	Burak Erdener	Castrol Ford Team Türkiye	Ford Fiesta Rally3	4:12:41.1	+10:35.4	20	7
27	6	70	Nataniel Bruun	Pablo Olmos	Nataniel Bruun	Ford Fiesta Rally3	4:15:21.5	+13:15.8	16	0
31	7	66	Max Smart	Cameron Fair	FIA Rally Star	Ford Fiesta Rally3	4:19:52.1	+17:46.4	12	0
34	8	59	Taylor Gill	Daniel Brkic	FIA Rally Star	Ford Fiesta Rally3	4:24:33.2	+22:27.5	8	0
38	9	60	Diego Domínguez Jr.	Rogelio Peñate	Diego Domínguez Jr.	Ford Fiesta Rally3	4:27:06.1	+25:00.4	4	1
45	10	72	Hubert Laskowski	Michał Kuśnierz	Hubert Laskowski	Ford Fiesta Rally3	4:53:31.8	+51:26.1	2	1
47	11	71	Andre Martinez	Fernando Mussano	Andre Martinez	Ford Fiesta Rally3	5:08:16.0	+1:06:10.3	0	0
Retired SS14		62	Petr Borodin	Roman Cheprasov	ASP Racing	Ford Fiesta Rally3	Crash		0	0
Retired SS13		67	Fabio Schwarz	Bernhard Ettel	Armin Schwarz Driving Experience	Ford Fiesta Rally3	Rolled		0	0

==== Special stages ====
Stage	Winners	Car	Time	Class leaders
SD	Maior / Maior	Ford Fiesta Rally3	2:56.6	—N/a
SS1	Stage cancelled			
SS2	Türkkan / Erdener	Ford Fiesta Rally3	17:57.5	Türkkan / Erdener
SS3	Jürgenson / Oja	Ford Fiesta Rally3	18:36.1	Maior / Maior
SS4	Türkkan / Erdener	Ford Fiesta Rally3	17:58.0	Jürgenson / Oja
SS5	Türkkan / Erdener	Ford Fiesta Rally3	17:56.9	Jürgenson / Oja
SS6	Dominguez / Penãte	Ford Fiesta Rally3	18:25.0	Maior / Maior
SS7	Jürgenson / Oja	Ford Fiesta Rally3	19:48.3	Jürgenson / Oja
SS8	Türkkan / Erdener	Ford Fiesta Rally3	16:07.8	Jürgenson / Oja
SS9	Dominguez / Peñate	Ford Fiesta Rally3	20:13.4	Jürgenson / Oja
SS10	Türkkan / Erdener	Ford Fiesta Rally3	9:49.6	Jürgenson / Oja
SS11	Schwarz / Ettel	Ford Fiesta Rally3	19:58.4	Maior / Maior
SS12	Jürgenson / Oja	Ford Fiesta Rally3	1:56.2	Maior / Maior
SS13	Türkkan / Erdener	Ford Fiesta Rally3	15:05.2	Maior / Maior
SS13	Dominguez / Penãte	Ford Fiesta Rally3	15:05.2	Maior / Maior
SS14	Türkkan / Erdener	Ford Fiesta Rally3	12:50.2	Maior / Maior
SS15	Laskowski / Kuśnierz	Ford Fiesta Rally3	12:33.2	Maior / Maior

==== Championship standings ====
- **Bold text** indicates 2024 World Champions.

Pos.	Drivers' championships			Co-drivers' championships		
Pos.	Move	Driver	Points	Move	Co-driver	Points
1		**Romet Jürgenson**	108		**Siim Oja**	108
2	5	Norbert Maior	80	5	Francesca Maior	80
3	1	Taylor Gill	69	1	Daniel Brkic	69
4		Ali Türkkan	68		Burak Erdener	68
5	3	Tom Rensonnet	59	5	Conor Mohan	49

== Notes ==
Previous rally: 2024 Rally Finland	2024 FIA World Rally Championship	Next rally: 2024 Rally Chile
Previous rally: 2023 Acropolis Rally	2024 Acropolis Rally	Next rally: 2025 Acropolis Rally
