= 2024 Rally Chile =

3rd edition of Rally Chile

2024 Rally Chile Rally Chile BIOBÍO 2024
Round 11 of 13 in the 2024 World Rally Championship
← Previous event	Next event →
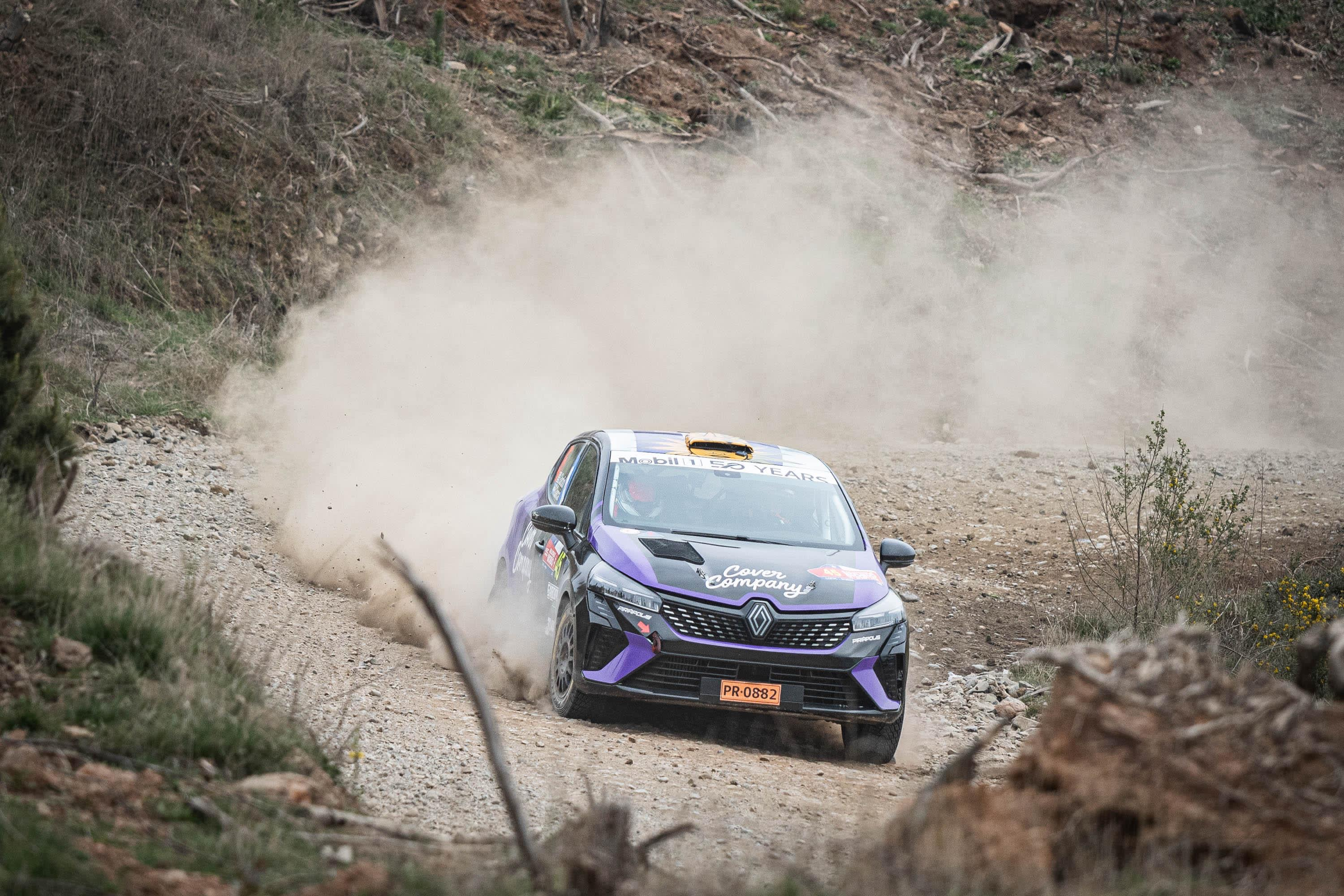
- Rally Chile was the final gravel rally on the 2024 calendar.
- Host country: Chile
- Rally base: Concepción, Biobío
- Dates run: 26 – 29 September 2024
- Start location: Coronel, Biobío
- Finish location: Concepción, Biobío
- Stages: 16 (307.48 km; 191.06 miles)
- Stage surface: Gravel
- Transport distance: 885.54 km (550.25 miles)
- Overall distance: 1,193.02 km (741.31 miles)

Statistics
- Crews registered: 45
- Crews: 42 at start, 37 at finish

Overall results
- Overall winner: (Finland) Kalle Rovanperä (Finland) Jonne Halttunen (Japan) Toyota Gazoo Racing WRT; 2:58:59.8
- Saturday Overall leader: (Finland) Kalle Rovanperä (Finland) Jonne Halttunen (Japan) Toyota Gazoo Racing WRT; 2:25:14.3
- Sunday Accumulated leader: (France) Sébastien Ogier (France) Vincent Landais (Japan) Toyota Gazoo Racing WRT; 33:37.3
- Power Stage winner: (France) Sébastien Ogier (France) Vincent Landais (Japan) Toyota Gazoo Racing WRT; 4:29.2

Support category results
- WRC-2 winner: (France) Yohan Rossel (France) Florian Barral (Belgium) DG Sport Compétition; 3:07:31.2
- WRC-3 winner: (Paraguay) Diego Dominguez Jr. (Spain) Rogelio Peñate; 3:26:06.6

The 2024 Rally Chile (also known as the Rally Chile BIOBÍO 2024) was a motor racing event for rally cars that was held over four days from 26 to 29 September 2024. It marked the third running of the Rally Chile, and was the eleventh round of the 2024 World Rally Championship, World Rally Championship-2 and World Rally Championship-3. The 2024 event was based in Concepción, Biobío, and was contested over sixteen special stages, covering a total competitive distance of 307.48 km (191.06 mi).

Ott Tänak and Martin Järveoja were the defending rally winners. The team they drove for in 2023, M-Sport Ford WRT, were the defending manufacturers' winners. Oliver Solberg and Elliott Edmondson were the defending rally winners in the WRC-2 category. Eduardo Castro and Fernando Mussano were the defending rally winners in the WRC-3 category.

Kalle Rovanperä and Jonne Halttunen won their fourth rally of the season, and their team, Toyota Gazoo Racing WRT, were the manufacturers' winners. Yohan Rossel and Florian Barral were the winners in the World Rally Championship-2 category. Diego Dominguez Jr. and Rogelio Peñate were the winners in the World Rally Championship-3 category, and crowned the category champions.

== Background ==
=== Entry list ===
The following crews entered into the rally. The event was open to crews competing in the World Rally Championship, its support categories, the World Rally Championship-2, World Rally Championship-3 and privateer entries that were not registered to score points in any championship. Ten entered under Rally1 regulations, as were sixteen Rally2 crews in the World Rally Championship-2 and three Rally3 crew in the World Rally Championship-3.

Rally1 entries competing in the World Rally Championship
No.	Driver	Co-Driver	Entrant	Car	Championship eligibility	Tyre
4	(Finland) Esapekka Lappi	(Finland) Janne Ferm	(South Korea) Hyundai Shell Mobis WRT	Hyundai i20 N Rally1	Driver, Co-driver, Manufacturer	P
5	(Finland) Sami Pajari	(Finland) Enni Mälkönen	(Japan) Toyota Gazoo Racing WRT	Toyota GR Yaris Rally1	Driver, Co-driver	P
8	(Estonia) Ott Tänak	(Estonia) Martin Järveoja	(South Korea) Hyundai Shell Mobis WRT	Hyundai i20 N Rally1	Driver, Co-driver, Manufacturer	P
11	(Belgium) Thierry Neuville	(Belgium) Martijn Wydaeghe	(South Korea) Hyundai Shell Mobis WRT	Hyundai i20 N Rally1	Driver, Co-driver, Manufacturer	P
13	(Luxembourg) Grégoire Munster	(Belgium) Louis Louka	(United Kingdom) M-Sport Ford WRT	Ford Puma Rally1	Driver, Co-driver, Manufacturer	P
16	(France) Adrien Fourmaux	(France) Alexandre Coria	(United Kingdom) M-Sport Ford WRT	Ford Puma Rally1	Driver, Co-driver, Manufacturer	P
17	(France) Sébastien Ogier	(France) Vincent Landais	(Japan) Toyota Gazoo Racing WRT	Toyota GR Yaris Rally1	Driver, Co-driver, Manufacturer	P
~~18~~	(Japan) ~~Takamoto Katsuta~~	(Republic of Ireland) ~~Aaron Johnston~~	(Japan) ~~Toyota Gazoo Racing WRT~~	~~Toyota GR Yaris Rally1~~	~~Driver, Co-driver~~	—N/a
22	(Latvia) Mārtiņš Sesks	(Latvia) Renārs Francis	(United Kingdom) M-Sport Ford WRT	Ford Puma Rally1	Driver, Co-driver	P
33	(United Kingdom) Elfyn Evans	(United Kingdom) Scott Martin	(Japan) Toyota Gazoo Racing WRT	Toyota GR Yaris Rally1	Driver, Co-driver, Manufacturer	P
69	(Finland) Kalle Rovanperä	(Finland) Jonne Halttunen	(Japan) Toyota Gazoo Racing WRT	Toyota GR Yaris Rally1	Driver, Co-driver, Manufacturer	P

Rally2 entries competing in the World Rally Championship-2
No.	Driver	Co-Driver	Entrant	Car	Championship eligibility	Tyre
20	(Sweden) Oliver Solberg	(United Kingdom) Elliott Edmondson	(Germany) Toksport WRT	Škoda Fabia RS Rally2	Driver, Co-driver, Team	P
21	(France) Yohan Rossel	(France) Florian Barral	(Belgium) DG Sport Compétition	Citroën C3 Rally2	Driver, Co-driver	P
23	(Bulgaria) Nikolay Gryazin	Konstantin Aleksandrov (Note: Konstantin Aleksandrov is Russian, but he competes as a neutral competitor using the ANA flag as Russian national emblems were banned by the association due to the Russian invasion of Ukraine.)	(Belgium) DG Sport Compétition	Citroën C3 Rally2	Challenger Driver, Challenger Co-driver	P
24	(Spain) Jan Solans	(Spain) Rodrigo Sanjuan de Eusebio	(Spain) Jan Solans	Toyota GR Yaris Rally2	Challenger Driver, Challenger Co-driver	P
25	(United Kingdom) Gus Greensmith	(Sweden) Jonas Andersson	(Germany) Toksport WRT 2	Škoda Fabia RS Rally2	Challenger Driver, Challenger Co-driver	P
26	(Poland) Kajetan Kajetanowicz	(Poland) Maciej Szczepaniak	(Poland) Kajetan Kajetanowicz	Škoda Fabia RS Rally2	Challenger Driver, Challenger Co-driver	P
27	(Paraguay) Fabrizio Zaldivar	(Italy) Marcelo Der Ohannesian	(Paraguay) Fabrizio Zaldivar	Škoda Fabia RS Rally2	Challenger Driver, Challenger Co-driver	P
28	(France) Pierre-Louis Loubet	(France) Loris Pascaud	(Germany) Toksport WRT	Škoda Fabia RS Rally2	Driver, Co-driver, Team	P
29	(Chile) Jorge Martínez Fontena	(Argentina) Alberto Alvarez Nicholson	(Chile) Jorge Martínez Fontena	Škoda Fabia RS Rally2	Challenger Driver, Challenger Co-driver	P
30	(Chile) Alberto Heller	(Argentina) Luis Ernesto Allende	(Chile) Alberto Heller	Citroën C3 Rally2	Driver, Co-driver	P
31	(Argentina) Martin Scuncio	(Chile) Javiera Roman	(Argentina) Martin Scuncio	Škoda Fabia Rally2 evo	Challenger Driver, Challenger Co-driver	P
32	(Chile) Pedro Heller	(Argentina) Pablo Olmos	(Chile) Pedro Heller	Citroën C3 Rally2	Challenger Driver, Challenger Co-driver	P
34	(Chile) Emilio Rosselot	(Chile) Tomas Cañete	(Chile) Emilio Rosselot	Citroën C3 Rally2	Challenger Driver, Challenger Co-driver	P
35	(Chile) Gerardo V. Rosselot	(Argentina) Marcelo Brizio	(Chile) Gerardo V. Rosselot	Citroën C3 Rally2	Challenger Driver, Challenger Co-driver	P
36	(Chile) Tadeo Rosselot	(Chile) Sebastián Olguín	(Chile) Tadeo Rosselot	Citroën C3 Rally2	Challenger Driver, Challenger Co-driver	P
37	(Chile) Eduardo Kovacs	(Argentina) Fernando Mussano	(Chile) Eduardo Kovacs	Škoda Fabia Rally2 evo	Challenger Driver, Challenger Co-driver	P

Rally3 entries competing in the World Rally Championship-3
No.	Driver	Co-Driver	Entrant	Car	Tyre
38	(Paraguay) Diego Dominguez Jr.	(Spain) Rogelio Peñate	(Paraguay) Diego Dominguez Jr.	Ford Fiesta Rally3	P
39	(France) Ghjuvanni Rossi	(France) Kylian Sarmezan	(France) Ghjuvanni Rossi	Renault Clio Rally3	P
40	(Peru) Eduardo Castro	(Spain) Diego Vallejo	(Peru) Eduardo Castro	Ford Fiesta Rally3	P

=== Itinerary ===
All dates and times are CLT (UTC-3).

Date	No.	Time span	Stage name	Distance
26 September	—	After 9:01	Conuco [Shakedown]	6.56 km
26 September		After 19:00	Opening ceremony, Concepción Bicentenario	—N/a
27 September	SS1	After 8:35	Pulperia 1	19.77 km
27 September	SS2	After 9:30	Rere 1	13.34 km
27 September	SS3	After 10:21	San Rosendo 1	23.32 km
27 September		12:21 – 13:11	Regroup, MDS Hotel Talcahuano	—N/a
27 September		13:11 – 13:41	Flexi service A, MDS Hotel Talcahuano	—N/a
27 September	SS4	After 14:46	Pulperia 2	19.77 km
27 September	SS5	After 15:41	Rere 2	13.34 km
27 September	SS6	After 16:32	San Rosendo 2	23.32 km
27 September		18:52 – 19:37	Flexi service B, MDS Hotel Talcahuano	—N/a
28 September	SS7	After 9:07	Pelun 1	15.68 km
28 September	SS8	After 10:01	Lota 1	25.58 km
28 September	SS9	After 11:05	Maria las Cruces 1	28.72 km
28 September		13:00 – 13:37	Regroup, MDS Hotel Talcahuano	—N/a
28 September		13:37 – 14:07	Flexi service C, MDS Hotel Talcahuano	—N/a
28 September	SS10	After 15:07	Pelun 2	15.68 km
28 September	SS11	After 16:01	Lota 2	25.58 km
28 September	SS12	After 17:05	Maria las Cruces 2	28.72 km
28 September		19:10 – 19:55	Flexi service D, MDS Hotel Talcahuano	—N/a
29 September	SS13	After 8:23	Laraquete 1	18.59 km
29 September	SS14	After 9:35	Bio Bio 1	8.74 km
29 September	SS15	After 10:33	Laraquete 2	18.59 km
29 September		11:19 – 12:19	Regroup, Arauco	—N/a
29 September	SS16	After 13:05	Bio Bio 2 [Power Stage]	8.74 km
29 September		After 15:30	Podium ceremony, Arauco	—N/a

== Report ==
=== WRC Rally1 ===
==== Classification ====
Position		No.	Driver	Co-driver	Entrant	Car	Time	Difference	Points			
Event	Class	No.	Driver	Co-driver	Entrant	Car	Time	Difference	SAT	SUN	WPS	Total
1	1	69	Kalle Rovanperä	Jonne Halttunen	Toyota Gazoo Racing WRT	Toyota GR Yaris Rally1	2:58:59.8	0.0	18	6	4	28
2	2	33	Elfyn Evans	Scott Martin	Toyota Gazoo Racing WRT	Toyota GR Yaris Rally1	2:59:23.2	+23.4	15	5	1	21
3	3	8	Ott Tänak	Martin Järveoja	Hyundai Shell Mobis WRT	Hyundai i20 N Rally1	2:59:43.7	+43.9	13	4	3	20
4	4	11	Thierry Neuville	Martijn Wydaeghe	Hyundai Shell Mobis WRT	Hyundai i20 N Rally1	3:00:00.9	+1:01.1	10	3	2	15
5	5	16	Adrien Fourmaux	Alexandre Coria	M-Sport Ford WRT	Ford Puma Rally1	3:01:02.5	+2:02.7	8	2	0	10
6	6	5	Sami Pajari	Enni Mälkönen	Toyota Gazoo Racing WRT	Toyota GR Yaris Rally1	3:01:39.5	+2:39.7	6	1	0	7
7	7	13	Grégoire Munster	Louis Louka	M-Sport Ford WRT	Ford Puma Rally1	3:01:47.5	+2:47.7	4	0	0	4
24	8	22	Mārtiņš Sesks	Renārs Francis	M-Sport Ford WRT	Ford Puma Rally1	3:37:54.5	+38:54.7	0	0	0	0
36	9	17	Sébastien Ogier	Vincent Landais	Toyota Gazoo Racing WRT	Toyota GR Yaris Rally1	4:26:02.9	+1:27:03.1	0	7	5	12
Retired SS16		4	Esapekka Lappi	Janne Ferm	Hyundai Shell Mobis WRT	Hyundai i20 N Rally1	Radiator		0	0	0	0
Did not start		18	Takamoto Katsuta	Aaron Johnston	Toyota Gazoo Racing WRT	Toyota GR Yaris Rally1	Withdrawn		0	0	0	0

==== Special stages ====
Stage	Winners	Car	Time	Class leaders
SD	Lappi / Ferm	Hyundai i20 N Rally1	3:18.2	—N/a
SS1	Ogier / Landais	Toyota GR Yaris Rally1	9:59.1	Ogier / Landais
SS2	Evans / Martin	Toyota GR Yaris Rally1	6:44.4	Ogier / Landais
SS3	Rovanperä / Halttunen	Toyota GR Yaris Rally1	12:20.5	Evans / Martin
SS4	Ogier / Landais	Toyota GR Yaris Rally1	9:52.3	Evans / Martin
SS5	Ogier / Landais	Toyota GR Yaris Rally1	6:35.9	Evans / Martin
SS6	Fourmaux / Coria	Ford Puma Rally1	12:05.4	Evans / Martin
SS7	Evans / Martin	Toyota GR Yaris Rally1	10:35.0	Evans / Martin
SS8	Rovanperä / Halttunen	Toyota GR Yaris Rally1	15:23.8	Evans / Martin
SS9	Evans / Martin	Toyota GR Yaris Rally1	17:04.3	Evans / Martin
SS10	Evans / Martin	Toyota GR Yaris Rally1	10:23.8	Evans / Martin
SS11	Neuville / Wydaeghe	Hyundai i20 N Rally1	15:57.1	Rovanperä / Halttunen
SS12	Fourmaux / Coria	Ford Puma Rally1	17:17.3	Rovanperä / Halttunen
SS13	Ogier / Landais	Toyota GR Yaris Rally1	12:12.8	Rovanperä / Halttunen
SS14	Ogier / Landais	Toyota GR Yaris Rally1	4:46.7	Rovanperä / Halttunen
SS15	Ogier / Landais	Toyota GR Yaris Rally1	12:08.6	Rovanperä / Halttunen
SS16	Ogier / Landais	Toyota GR Yaris Rally1	4:29.2	Rovanperä / Halttunen

==== Championship standings ====
Pos.	Drivers' championships			Co-drivers' championships			Manufacturers' championships		
Pos.	Move	Driver	Points	Move	Co-driver	Points	Move	Manufacturer	Points
1		Thierry Neuville	207		Martijn Wydaeghe	207		Hyundai Shell Mobis WRT	482
2		Ott Tänak	178		Martin Järveoja	178		Toyota Gazoo Racing WRT	465
3		Sébastien Ogier	166		Vincent Landais	166		M-Sport Ford WRT	245
4		Elfyn Evans	161		Scott Martin	161			
5		Adrien Fourmaux	140		Alexandre Coria	140			

=== WRC-2 Rally2 ===
==== Classification ====
Position		No.	Driver	Co-driver	Entrant	Car	Time	Difference	Points	
Event	Class	No.	Driver	Co-driver	Entrant	Car	Time	Difference	Class	Event
8	1	21	Yohan Rossel	Florian Barral	DG Sport Compétition	Citroën C3 Rally2	3:07:31.2	0.0	25	3
9	2	23	Nikolay Gryazin	Konstantin Aleksandrov	DG Sport Compétition	Citroën C3 Rally2	3:07:48.5	+17.3	18	2
10	3	25	Gus Greensmith	Jonas Andersson	Toksport WRT 2	Škoda Fabia RS Rally2	3:07:51.9	+20.7	15	1
11	4	20	Oliver Solberg	Elliott Edmondson	Toksport WRT	Škoda Fabia RS Rally2	3:07:57.3	+26.1	12	0
12	5	26	Kajetan Kajetanowicz	Maciej Szczepaniak	Kajetan Kajetanowicz	Škoda Fabia RS Rally2	3:10:57.8	+3:26.6	10	0
13	6	27	Fabrizio Zaldivar	Marcelo Der Ohannesian	Fabrizio Zaldivar	Škoda Fabia RS Rally2	3:12:34.4	+5:03.2	8	0
14	7	29	Jorge Martínez Fontena	Alberto Alvarez Nicholson	Jorge Martínez Fontena	Škoda Fabia RS Rally2	3:13:28.5	+5:57.3	6	0
15	8	30	Alberto Heller	Luis Ernesto Allende	Alberto Heller	Citroën C3 Rally2	3:14:43.5	+7:12.3	4	0
16	9	24	Jan Solans	Rodrigo Sanjuan de Eusebio	Jan Solans	Toyota GR Yaris Rally2	3:17:54.6	+10:23.4	2	0
17	10	32	Pedro Heller	Pablo Olmos	Pedro Heller	Citroën C3 Rally2	3:18:01.7	+10:30.5	1	0
18	11	34	Emilio Rosselot	Tomas Cañete	Emilio Rosselot	Citroën C3 Rally2	3:21:05.5	+13:34.3	0	0
25	12	37	Eduardo Kovacs	Fernando Mussano	Eduardo Kovacs	Škoda Fabia Rally2 evo	3:44:00.3	+36:29.1	0	0
32	13	35	Gerardo V. Rosselot	Marcelo Brizio	Gerardo V. Rosselot	Citroën C3 Rally2	4:11:00.3	+1:03:29.1	0	0
Retired SS15		31	Martin Scuncio	Javiera Roman	Martin Scuncio	Škoda Fabia Rally2 evo	Accident		0	0

==== Special stages ====
Overall
Stage	Winners	Car	Time	Class leaders
SD	Gryazin / Aleksandrov	Citroën C3 Rally2	3:37.2	—N/a
SS1	Stage cancelled			
SS2	Gryazin / Aleksandrov	Citroën C3 Rally2	7:00.7	Gryazin / Aleksandrov
SS3	Gryazin / Aleksandrov	Citroën C3 Rally2	12:44.7	Gryazin / Aleksandrov
SS4	Greensmith / Andersson	Škoda Fabia RS Rally2	10:22.1	Gryazin / Aleksandrov
SS5	Greensmith / Andersson	Škoda Fabia RS Rally2	6:53.2	Gryazin / Aleksandrov
SS6	Solberg / Edmondson	Škoda Fabia RS Rally2	12:32.5	Gryazin / Aleksandrov
SS7	Rossel / Barral	Citroën C3 Rally2	10:57.5	Rossel / Barral
SS8	Solans / Sanjuan de Eusebio	Toyota GR Yaris Rally2	16:00.8	Rossel / Barral
SS9	Solberg / Edmondson	Škoda Fabia RS Rally2	17:43.8	Solberg / Edmondson
SS10	Solans / Sanjuan de Eusebio	Toyota GR Yaris Rally2	10:42.3	Solberg / Edmondson
SS11	Gryazin / Aleksandrov	Citroën C3 Rally2	16:57.0	Rossel / Barral
SS12	Solberg / Edmondson	Škoda Fabia RS Rally2	17:54.1	Rossel / Barral
SS13	Solberg / Edmondson	Škoda Fabia RS Rally2	12:50.5	Rossel / Barral
SS14	Solberg / Edmondson	Škoda Fabia RS Rally2	4:59.0	Rossel / Barral
SS15	Solberg / Edmondson	Škoda Fabia RS Rally2	12:36.7	Rossel / Barral
SS16	Solberg / Edmondson	Škoda Fabia RS Rally2	4:48.3	Rossel / Barral

Challenger
Stage	Winners	Car	Time	Class leaders
SD	Gryazin / Aleksandrov	Citroën C3 Rally2	3:37.2	—N/a
SS1	Stage cancelled			
SS2	Gryazin / Aleksandrov	Citroën C3 Rally2	7:00.7	Gryazin / Aleksandrov
SS3	Gryazin / Aleksandrov	Citroën C3 Rally2	12:44.7	Gryazin / Aleksandrov
SS4	Gryazin / Aleksandrov	Citroën C3 Rally2	10:25.4	Gryazin / Aleksandrov
SS5	Gryazin / Aleksandrov	Citroën C3 Rally2	6:54.8	Gryazin / Aleksandrov
SS6	Gryazin / Aleksandrov	Citroën C3 Rally2	12:36.2	Gryazin / Aleksandrov
SS7	Solans / Sanjuan de Eusebio	Toyota GR Yaris Rally2	10:58.1	Gryazin / Aleksandrov
SS8	Solans / Sanjuan de Eusebio	Toyota GR Yaris Rally2	16:00.8	Gryazin / Aleksandrov
SS9	Gryazin / Aleksandrov	Citroën C3 Rally2	17:56.2	Gryazin / Aleksandrov
SS10	Solans / Sanjuan de Eusebio	Toyota GR Yaris Rally2	10:42.3	Gryazin / Aleksandrov
SS11	Gryazin / Aleksandrov	Citroën C3 Rally2	16:57.0	Gryazin / Aleksandrov
SS12	Gryazin / Aleksandrov	Citroën C3 Rally2	18:17.5	Gryazin / Aleksandrov
SS13	Gryazin / Aleksandrov	Citroën C3 Rally2	13:04.6	Gryazin / Aleksandrov
SS14	Solans / Sanjuan de Eusebio	Toyota GR Yaris Rally2	5:04.6	Gryazin / Aleksandrov
SS15	Solans / Sanjuan de Eusebio	Toyota GR Yaris Rally2	12:46.7	Gryazin / Aleksandrov
SS16	Solans / Sanjuan de Eusebio	Toyota GR Yaris Rally2	4:48.6	Gryazin / Aleksandrov

==== Championship standings ====
- **Bold text** indicates 2024 World Champions.

Pos.	Open Drivers' championships			Open Co-drivers' championships			Teams' championships			Challenger Drivers' championships			Challenger Co-drivers' championships		
Pos.	Move	Driver	Points	Move	Co-driver	Points	Move	Manufacturer	Points	Move	Manufacturer	Points	Move	Driver	Points
1		Oliver Solberg	123		Elliott Edmondson	123		**DG Sport Compétition**	252		Sami Pajari	118		Enni Mälkönen	118
2	1	Yohan Rossel	111		Enni Mälkönen	108		Toksport WRT	205	2	Nikolay Gryazin	80	2	Konstantin Aleksandrov	80
3	1	Sami Pajari	108	3	Konstantin Aleksandrov	66		Toyota Gazoo Racing WRT NG	73	1	Lauri Joona	78	1	Janni Hussi	78
4	2	Nikolay Gryazin	66	1	Janni Hussi	58		Toksport WRT 2	72	4	Kajetan Kajetanowicz	70	4	Maciej Szczepaniak	70
5	1	Lauri Joona	58		Rodrigo Sanjuan de Eusebio	54				2	Jan Solans	68	2	Rodrigo Sanjuan de Eusebio	68

=== WRC-3 Rally3 ===
==== Classification ====
Position		No.	Driver	Co-driver	Entrant	Car	Time	Difference	Points
Event	Class	No.	Driver	Co-driver	Entrant	Car	Time	Difference	Points
19	1	38	Diego Dominguez Jr.	Rogelio Peñate	Diego Dominguez Jr.	Ford Fiesta Rally3	3:26:06.6	0.0	**25**
20	2	40	Eduardo Castro	Diego Vallejo	Eduardo Castro	Ford Fiesta Rally3	3:30:18.8	+4:12.2	**18**
31	3	39	Ghjuvanni Rossi	Kylian Sarmezan	Ghjuvanni Rossi	Renault Clio Rally3	4:06:10.9	+40:04.3	**15**

==== Special stages ====
Stage	Winners	Car	Time	Class leaders
SD	Castro / Vallejo	Ford Fiesta Rally3	3:51.9	—N/a
SS1	Stage cancelled			
SS2	Dominguez / Peñate	Ford Fiesta Rally3	7:48.5	Dominguez / Peñate
SS3	Dominguez / Peñate	Ford Fiesta Rally3	14:19.6	Dominguez / Peñate
SS4	Dominguez / Peñate	Ford Fiesta Rally3	11:43.2	Dominguez / Peñate
SS5	Dominguez / Peñate	Ford Fiesta Rally3	7:44.0	Dominguez / Peñate
SS6	Dominguez / Peñate	Ford Fiesta Rally3	14:08.0	Dominguez / Peñate
SS7	Dominguez / Peñate	Ford Fiesta Rally3	12:00.2	Dominguez / Peñate
SS8	Dominguez / Peñate	Ford Fiesta Rally3	17:50.0	Dominguez / Peñate
SS9	Castro / Vallejo	Ford Fiesta Rally3	19:37.4	Dominguez / Peñate
SS10	Dominguez / Peñate	Ford Fiesta Rally3	11:41.2	Dominguez / Peñate
SS11	Stage cancelled			
SS12	Dominguez / Peñate	Ford Fiesta Rally3	19:51.7	Dominguez / Peñate
SS13	Castro / Vallejo	Ford Fiesta Rally3	14:25.3	Dominguez / Peñate
SS14	Rossi / Sarmezan	Renault Clio Rally3	5:36.9	Dominguez / Peñate
SS15	Rossi / Sarmezan	Renault Clio Rally3	14:03.9	Dominguez / Peñate
SS16	Dominguez / Peñate	Ford Fiesta Rally3	5:22.6	Dominguez / Peñate

==== Championship standings ====
- **Bold text** indicates 2024 World Champions.

Pos.	Drivers' championships			Co-drivers' championships		
Pos.	Move	Driver	Points	Move	Co-driver	Points
1		**Diego Dominguez Jr.**	100		**Rogelio Peñate**	100
2		Romet Jürgenson	61		Siim Oja	61
3		Norbert Maior	49		Francesca Maria Maior	49
4		Mattéo Chatillon	48		Maxence Cornuau	48
5		Jan Černý	47		Ondřej Krajča	47

== Notes ==
Previous rally: 2024 Acropolis Rally	2024 FIA World Rally Championship	Next rally: 2024 Central European Rally
Previous rally: 2023 Rally Chile	2024 Rally Chile	Next rally: 2025 Rally Chile
