= 2024 WRC3 Championship =

Motorsport championship

The 2024 FIA WRC3 Championship was the eleventh season of WRC3, a rallying championship for organised and governed by the Fédération Internationale de l'Automobile as the third-highest tier of international rallying. It was opened to privateers and teams using cars complying with Group Rally3 regulations. The championship began in January 2024 with the Monte Carlo Rally and concluded in November 2024 with the Rally Japan, and ran in support of the 2024 World Rally Championship.

Roope Korhonen and Anssi Viinikka were the defending drivers' and co-drivers' champions. Diego Dominguez Jr. and Rogelio Peñate became the 2024 WRC3 champions.

== Calendar ==
A map showing the locations of the rallies in the 2024 championship. Event headquarters are marked with black dots.

The 2024 season was contested over thirteen rounds across Europe, Africa, South America and Asia.

Round	Start date	Finish date	Rally	Rally headquarters	Surface	Stages	Distance	Ref.
1	25 January	28 January	(Monaco) Rallye Automobile Monte Carlo	Gap, Provence-Alpes-Côte d'Azur, France	Mixed (Note: The Monte Carlo Rally is run on a tarmac and snow surface.)	17	324.44 km	
2	15 February	18 February	Rally Sweden	Umeå, Västerbotten County, Sweden	Snow	18	300.10 km	
3	28 March	31 March	Safari Rally Kenya	Nairobi, Nakuru County, Kenya	Gravel	19	355.92 km	
4	18 April	21 April	Croatia Rally	Zagreb, Croatia	Tarmac	20	283.28 km	
5	9 May	12 May	Rally de Portugal	Matosinhos, Porto, Portugal	Gravel	22	337.04 km	
6	30 May	2 June	(Italy) Rally Italia Sardegna	Alghero, Sardinia, Italy	Gravel	16	266.12 km	
7	27 June	30 June	Rally Poland	Mikołajki, Warmian–Masurian, Poland	Gravel	19	304.10 km	
8	18 July	21 July	Rally Latvia	Liepāja, Kurzeme Planning Region, Latvia	Gravel	20	300.13 km	
9	1 August	4 August	Rally Finland	Jyväskylä, Central Finland, Finland	Gravel	20	305.69 km	
10	5 September	8 September	Acropolis Rally Greece	Lamia, Central Greece, Greece	Gravel	15	305.30 km	
11	26 September	29 September	Rally Chile	Concepción, Biobío, Chile	Gravel	16	306.76 km	
12	17 October	20 October	(Europe) Central European Rally	Bad Griesbach, Bavaria, Germany	Tarmac	18	302.51 km	
13	21 November	24 November	Rally Japan	Toyota, Aichi, Japan	Tarmac	21	302.59 km	

=== Calendar changes ===
The championship was expected to be expanded to 14 rounds, however WRC Promoter GmbH retained the existing total of 13 events with the reasoning that it would aid participation of more Rally1 cars.

- Rally Liepāja stepped up from the European Rally Championship to hold a World Rally Championship event under a new name, Rally Latvia. The rally was held on gravel roads that ranged from the cities of Rīga and Liepāja to the regions of Talsi, Tukums, Kuldīga and Dienvidkurzeme.
- Rally Poland returned to the championship. This marked the first time the event was held as a WRC event since 2017.
- Rally Estonia was replaced by Rally Latvia on the calendar in 2024, but the event returned in 2025.
- Rally Mexico dropped off the calendar.

The WRC Promoter GmbH was also working on the two key calendar expansions for the future.

- Progress had been made for the candidate event in the United States, a location that was also aiming to join the championship in 2024.
- The other key expansion was Rally China, which was last featured in 1999. The rally was also scheduled to be held in 2016, but it was ultimately cancelled due to the damage caused by the 2016 China floods.

In addition, the candidate list also included the event in Saudi Arabia, where it aimed at a 2025 calendar slot. The rally was a part of WRC Promoter GmbH's plan to deliver a desert event. Rally Argentina was also bidding to return to the championship.

=== Other changes ===
- The organizers of the Monte Carlo Rally relocated its headquarters back to Gap in France. The rally was previously based in Monaco.
- The Kenyan Rally, which took place in June in the previous three seasons, moved ahead to March at the weekend of Easter as the third round of the season.
- The running date of the Central European Rally was moved two weeks earlier with a headquarter change to avoid the clash with All Saints' Day.

== Entries ==
The following crews are set to enter the 2024 WRC3 Championship:

Car	Entrant	Driver name	Co-driver name	Rounds
Ford Fiesta Rally3	(Kenya) Hamza Anwar	(Kenya) Hamza Anwar	(Kenya) Adnan Din	3
Ford Fiesta Rally3	(Turkey) Atölye Kazaz	(Turkey) Kerem Kazaz	(France) Corentin Silvestre	8–9
Ford Fiesta Rally3	(Germany) Armin Schwarz Driving Experience	(Germany) Fabio Schwarz	(Austria) Bernhard Ettel	2, 4, 6, 9
Ford Fiesta Rally3	(Kazakhstan) ASP Racing	(Kazakhstan) Petr Borodin	(Kazakhstan) Roman Cheprasov	2, 4, 6, 9
Ford Fiesta Rally3	(Spain) Roberto Blach	(Spain) Roberto Blach	(Spain) Mauro Barreiro	2, 4
Ford Fiesta Rally3	(Poland) Grzegorz Bonder	(Poland) Grzegorz Bonder	(Poland) Paweł Pochroń	7, 9
Ford Fiesta Rally3	(Bolivia) Nataniel Bruun	(Bolivia) Nataniel Bruun	(Argentina) Pablo Olmos	2, 4, 6–7, 9
Ford Fiesta Rally3	(Bolivia) Bruno Bulacia	(Bolivia) Bruno Bulacia	(Brazil) Gabriel Morales	2, 5–6
Ford Fiesta Rally3	(Peru) Eduardo Castro	(Peru) Eduardo Castro	(Chile) Javiera Roman	6
Ford Fiesta Rally3	(Turkey) Castrol Ford Team Türkiye	(Turkey) Ali Türkkan	(Turkey) Burak Erdener	4, 6, 9
Ford Fiesta Rally3	(Portugal) Nuno Caetano	(Portugal) Nuno Caetano	(Portugal) Sofia Mouta	5
Ford Fiesta Rally3	(Czech Republic) Jan Černý	(Czech Republic) Jan Černý	(Czech Republic) Ondřej Krajča	1–2, 5, 7–8
Ford Fiesta Rally3	(France) Tristan Charpentier	(France) Tristan Charpentier	(France) Florian Barral	4–5
Ford Fiesta Rally3	(France) Tristan Charpentier	(France) Tristan Charpentier	(France) Alexis Maillefert	9
Ford Fiesta Rally3	(Italy) Carlo Covi	(Italy) Carlo Covi	(Italy) Simone Angi	1
Ford Fiesta Rally3	(Finland) Raoul Dahlqvist	(Finland) Raoul Dahlqvist	(Finland) Patric Öhman	9
Ford Fiesta Rally3	(Poland) Dantex Rally Team	(Poland) Marek Roefler	(Poland) Marek Bała	7
Ford Fiesta Rally3	(Paraguay) Diego Domínguez	(Paraguay) Diego Domínguez Jr.	(Spain) Rogelio Peñate	2, 4–7
Ford Fiesta Rally3	FIA Rally Star	(Peru) Jose Caparó	(Mexico) Esther Gutiérrez	2, 4, 6, 9
Ford Fiesta Rally3	FIA Rally Star	(Australia) Taylor Gill	(Australia) Daniel Brkic	2, 4, 6, 9
Ford Fiesta Rally3	FIA Rally Star	(Estonia) Romet Jürgenson	(Estonia) Siim Oja	2, 4, 6, 9
Ford Fiesta Rally3	FIA Rally Star	(South Africa) Max Smart	(United Kingdom) Cameron Fair	2, 4, 6, 9
Ford Fiesta Rally3	(Spain) Raúl Hernández	(Spain) Raúl Hernández	(Spain) José Murado	2, 4, 6, 9
Ford Fiesta Rally3	(Finland) Toni Herranen	(Finland) Toni Herranen	(Finland) Juho-Ville Koskela	9
Ford Fiesta Rally3	(Finland) Henri Hokkala	(Finland) Henri Hokkala	(Finland) Kimmo Pahkala	9
Ford Fiesta Rally3	(Sweden) Mille Johansson	(Sweden) Mille Johansson	(Sweden) Johan Grönvall	2
Ford Fiesta Rally3	(Finland) Jesse Kallio	(Finland) Jesse Kallio	(Finland) Ville Pynnönen	9
Ford Fiesta Rally3	(Czech Republic) Filip Kohn	(Czech Republic) Filip Kohn	(United Kingdom) Tom Woodburn	2, 4
Ford Fiesta Rally3	(Poland) Hubert Laskowski	(Poland) Hubert Laskowski	(Poland) Michał Kuśnierz	9
Ford Fiesta Rally3	(Republic of Ireland) Motorsport Ireland Rally Academy	(Republic of Ireland) Eamonn Kelly	(Republic of Ireland) Conor Mohan	2, 4, 6, 9
Ford Fiesta Rally3	(Romania) Norbert Maior	(Romania) Norbert Maior	(Romania) Francesca Maior	2, 4, 6, 9
Ford Fiesta Rally3	(Poland) Jakub Matulka	(Poland) Jakub Matulka	(Poland) Daniel Dymurski	2, 4, 6–7
Ford Fiesta Rally3	(Croatia) Jan Pokos	(Croatia) Jan Pokos	(Slovakia) Viljem Ošlaj	4
Ford Fiesta Rally3	(Croatia) Viliam Prodan	(Croatia) Viliam Prodan	(Croatia) Marko Stiperski	4
Ford Fiesta Rally3	(Belgium) RACB National Team	(Belgium) Tom Rensonnet	(Belgium) Loïc Dumont	2
Ford Fiesta Rally3	(Belgium) RACB National Team	(Belgium) Tom Rensonnet	(France) Manon Deliot	4, 6, 9
Ford Fiesta Rally3	(Croatia) Slaven Šekuljica	(Croatia) Slaven Šekuljica	(Croatia) Damir Petrović	4–6
Ford Fiesta Rally3	(Latvia) Sports Racing Technologies	(Chinese Taipei) Enola Hsieh	(Finland) Matias Peippo	8
Ford Fiesta Rally3	(Poland) Paweł Ważny	(Poland) Paweł Ważny	(Poland) Bartosz Dzienis	7
Renault Clio Rally3	(France) Mattéo Chatillon	(France) Mattéo Chatillon	(France) Maxence Cornuau	4–7, 9
Renault Clio Rally3	(Estonia) LightGrey	(Estonia) Joosep Ralf Nõgene	(Estonia) Hendrik Kraav	8
Renault Clio Rally3	(France) Ghjuvanni Rossi	(France) Ghjuvanni Rossi	(France) Kylian Sarmezan	1, 5–6
Renault Clio Rally3	(France) Tom Pieri	(France) Tom Pieri	(France) Alexis Maillefert	5–6

== Results and standings ==
=== Season summary ===
Round	Event	Winning driver	Winning co-driver	Winning entrant	Winning time	Report	Ref.
1	(Monaco) Rallye Automobile Monte Carlo	(Czech Republic) Jan Černý	(Czech Republic) Ondřej Krajča	(Czech Republic) Jan Černý	3:42:09.1	Report	
2	Rally Sweden	(Sweden) Mille Johansson	(Sweden) Johan Grönvall	(Sweden) Mille Johansson	2:49:33.8	Report	
3	Safari Rally Kenya	(Kenya) Hamza Anwar	(Kenya) Adnan Din	(Kenya) Hamza Anwar	6:16:11.8	Report	
4	Croatia Rally	(Estonia) Romet Jürgenson	(Estonia) Siim Oja	FIA Rally Star	3:02:44.1	Report	
5	Rally de Portugal	(Paraguay) Diego Dominguez Jr.	(Spain) Rogelio Peñate	(Paraguay) Diego Dominguez Jr.	4:09:54.7	Report	
6	(Italy) Rally Italia Sardegna	(Paraguay) Diego Dominguez Jr.	(Spain) Rogelio Peñate	(Paraguay) Diego Dominguez Jr.	3:33:09.3	Report	
7	Rally Poland	(Paraguay) Diego Dominguez Jr.	(Spain) Rogelio Peñate	(Paraguay) Diego Dominguez Jr.	2:53:28.9	Report	
8	Rally Latvia	(Estonia) Joosep Nõgene	(Estonia) Aleks Lesk	(Estonia) LightGrey	2:51:52.1	Report	
9	Rally Finland	(Finland) Jesse Kallio	(Finland) Ville Pynnönen	(Finland) Jesse Kallio	2:48:30.3	Report	
10	Acropolis Rally Greece	(Romania) Norbert Maior	(Romania) Francesca Maria Maior	(Romania) Norbert Maior	4:02:05.7	Report	
11	Rally Chile	(Paraguay) Diego Dominguez Jr.	(Spain) Rogelio Peñate	(Paraguay) Diego Dominguez Jr.	3:26:06.6	Report	
12	(Europe) Central European Rally	(France) Mattéo Chatillon	(France) Maxence Cornuau	(France) Mattéo Chatillon	2:58:43.2	Report	
13	Rally Japan	(Paraguay) Diego Dominguez Jr.	(Spain) Rogelio Peñate	(Paraguay) Diego Dominguez Jr.	3:49:22.2	Report	

=== Scoring system ===
Position	1st	2nd	3rd	4th	5th	6th	7th	8th	9th	10th
Points	25	18	15	12	10	8	6	4	2	1

=== FIA WRC3 Championship for Drivers ===
Pos.	Driver	MON (Monaco)	SWE (Sweden)	KEN (Kenya)	CRO (Croatia)	POR (Portugal)	ITA (Italy)	POL (Poland)	LAT (Latvia)	FIN (Finland)	GRE (Greece)	CHL (Chile)	EUR (Europe)	JPN (Japan)	Points
1	(Paraguay) Diego Dominguez Jr.		Ret		13	1	1	1				1		1	125
2	(France) Mattéo Chatillon				2	2	16	4		Ret			1		73
3	(Estonia) Romet Jürgenson		2		1		12			13	2				61
4	(France) Ghjuvanni Rossi	2				5	14					3		2	61
5	(Czech Republic) Jan Černý	1	Ret			4		5	WD				6		55
6	(Romania) Norbert Maior		8		5		5			Ret	1				49
7	(Australia) Taylor Gill		7		4		6			2	10				45
8	(Turkey) Ali Türkkan				Ret		2			3	5				43
9	(Belgium) Tom Rensonnet		5		14		10			4	3				38
10	(Czech Republic) Filip Kohn		11		3								2		33
11	(Bolivia) Nataniel Bruun		12		18		7	3		8	6				33
12	(Kazakhstan) Petr Borodin		6		Ret		4			5	Ret				30
13	(Sweden) Mille Johansson		1												25
14	(Kenya) Hamza Anwar			1											25
15	(Estonia) Joosep Ralf Nõgene								1						25
16	(Finland) Jesse Kallio									1					25
17	(South Africa) Max Smart		9		10		3			12	8				22
18	(France) Tristan Charpentier				8	6				WD			5		22
19	(Republic of Ireland) Eamonn Kelly		3		Ret		11			7	WD				21
20	(Turkey) Kerem Kazaz								2	10					19
21	(Bolivia) Bruno Bulacia		Ret		NC	3	8								19
22	(Poland) Jakub Matulka		13		12			2							18
23	(Peru) Eduardo Castro						15					2			18
24	(Peru) Jose Caparó		Ret		9		13			9	4				16
25	(Germany) Hermann Gaßner jr.												3		15
26	(Poland) Hubert Laskowski									DSQ	14		4		12
27	(Spain) Raúl Hernández		4		17		Ret			WD					12
28	(Germany) Fabio Schwarz		Ret		16		9			6	Ret				10
29	(Spain) Roberto Blach Núñez		10		6										9
30	(Poland) Marek Roefler							6							8
31	(Croatia) Viliam Prodan				7										6
32	(Poland) Paweł Ważny							7							6
33	(Greece) Efthimios Halkias										7				6
34	(Germany) Claire Schönborn												7		6
35	(Croatia) Slaven Šekuljica				11	Ret	WD				Ret		8		4
36	(Poland) Grzegorz Bonder							8		11					4
37	(Greece) Paschalis Chatzimarkos										9				2
38	(Belgium) Lyssia Baudet												9		2
Pos.	Driver	MON (Monaco)	SWE (Sweden)	KEN (Kenya)	CRO (Croatia)	POR (Portugal)	ITA (Italy)	POL (Poland)	LAT (Latvia)	FIN (Finland)	GRE (Greece)	CHL (Chile)	EUR (Europe)	JPN (Japan)	Points

Key
Colour	Result
Gold	Winner
Silver	2nd place
Bronze	3rd place
Green	Points finish
Blue	Non-points finish
Blue	Non-classified finish (NC)
Purple	Did not finish (Ret)
Black	Excluded (EX)
Black	Disqualified (DSQ)
White	Did not start (DNS)
White	Cancelled (C)
Blank	Withdrew entry from the event (WD)

=== FIA WRC3 Championship for Co-drivers ===
Pos.	Driver	MON (Monaco)	SWE (Sweden)	KEN (Kenya)	CRO (Croatia)	POR (Portugal)	ITA (Italy)	POL (Poland)	LAT (Latvia)	FIN (Finland)	GRE (Greece)	CHL (Chile)	EUR (Europe)	JPN (Japan)	Points
1	(Spain) Rogelio Peñate		Ret		13	1	1	1				1		1	125
2	(France) Maxence Cornuau				2	2	16	4		Ret			1		73
3	(Estonia) Siim Oja		2		1		12			13	2				61
4	(France) Kylian Sarmezan	2				5	14					3		2	61
5	(Czech Republic) Ondřej Krajča	1	Ret			4		5	WD				6		55
6	(Romania) Francesca Maria Maior		8		5		5			Ret	1				49
7	(Australia) Daniel Brkic		7		4		6			2	10				45
8	(Turkey) Burak Erdener				Ret		2			3	5				43
9	(Argentina) Pablo Olmos		12		18		7	3		8	6				33
10	(Kazakhstan) Roman Cheprasov		6		Ret		4			5	Ret				30
11	(France) Corentin Silvestre								2	10			5		29
12	(France) Manon Deliot				14		10			4	3				28
13	(Sweden) Johan Grönvall		1												25
14	(Kenya) Adnan Din			1											25
15	(Estonia) Aleks Lesk								1						25
16	(Finland) Ville Pynnönen									1					25
17	(United Kingdom) Cameron Fair		9		10		3			12	8				22
18	(Republic of Ireland) Conor Mohan		3		Ret		11			7	WD				21
19	(Brazil) Gabriel Morales		Ret		NC	3	8								19
20	(Poland) Daniel Dymurski		13		12			2							18
21	(Spain) Diego Vallejo											2			18
22	(United Kingdom) Ross Whittock												2		18
23	(Spain) Esther Gutiérrez Porras		Ret		9		13			9	4				16
24	(United Kingdom) Tom Woodburn		11		3										15
25	(Germany) Michael Wenzel												3		15
26	(Poland) Michał Kuśnierz									DSQ	14		4		12
27	(Spain) José Murado González		4		17		Ret			WD					12
28	(France) Florian Barral				8	6									12
29	(Belgium) Loïc Dumont		5												10
30	(Austria) Bernhard Ettel		Ret		16		9			6	Ret				10
31	(Spain) Mauro Barreiro		10		6										9
32	(Poland) Marek Bała							6							8
33	(Croatia) Marko Stiperski				7										6
34	(Poland) Bartosz Dzienis							7							6
35	(Greece) Nikos Komnos										7				6
36	(Germany) Jara Hain												7		6
37	(Croatia) Damir Petrović				11	Ret	WD				Ret		8		4
38	(Poland) Paweł Pochroń							8		11					4
39	(Greece) Marios Tsaoussoglou										9				2
40	(France) Léa Sam-Caw-Freve												9		2
Pos.	Driver	MON (Monaco)	SWE (Sweden)	KEN (Kenya)	CRO (Croatia)	POR (Portugal)	ITA (Italy)	POL (Poland)	LAT (Latvia)	FIN (Finland)	GRE (Greece)	CHL (Chile)	EUR (Europe)	JPN (Japan)	Points

Key
Colour	Result
Gold	Winner
Silver	2nd place
Bronze	3rd place
Green	Points finish
Blue	Non-points finish
Blue	Non-classified finish (NC)
Purple	Did not finish (Ret)
Black	Excluded (EX)
Black	Disqualified (DSQ)
White	Did not start (DNS)
White	Cancelled (C)
Blank	Withdrew entry from the event (WD)
