= Elliott Edmondson =

British rally co-driver (born 1994)

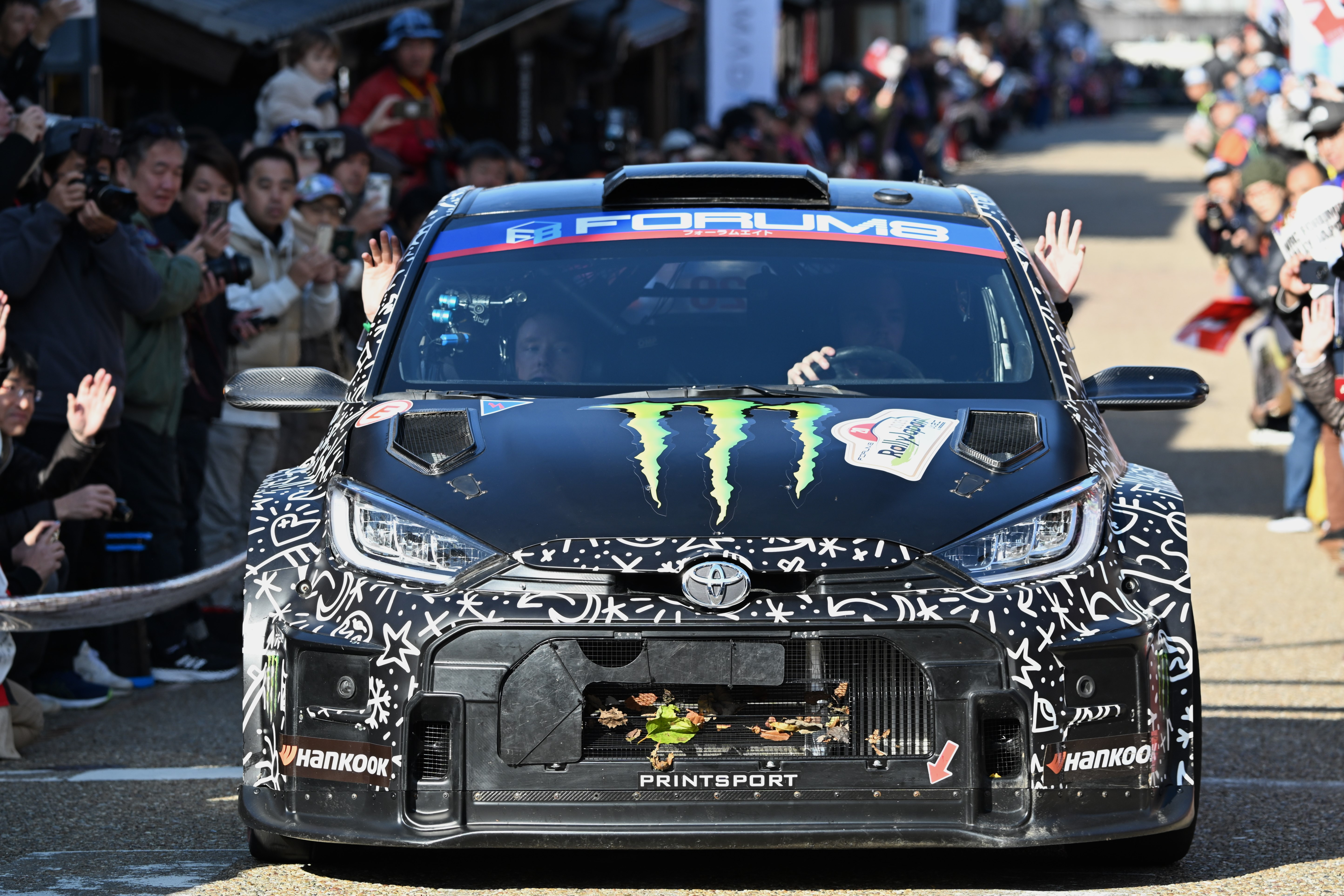
- Edmondson (left) at the 2025 Rally Japan

Personal information
- Nationality: Great Britain
- Full name: Elliott Andrew Edmondson
- Born: August 29, 1994 (age 32)

World Rally Championship record
- Years active: 2013, 2015–present
- Driver: (United Kingdom) John Pritchard (United Kingdom) Gus Greensmith (United Kingdom) Chris Ingram (United Kingdom) Callum Black (United Kingdom) Rhys Yates (Norway) Andreas Mikkelsen (Sweden) Oliver Solberg
- Teams: M-Sport Ford WRT, Toksport WRT, Hyundai Motorsport, Printsport, Toyota Gazoo Racing
- Championships: 0
- Rally wins: 2
- Podiums: 2
- First rally: 2013 Wales Rally GB
- First win: 2025 Rally Estonia
- Last win: 2026 Monte Carlo Rally
- Last rally: 2025 Rally Saudi Arabia

Elliott Andrew Edmondson (born 29 August 1994) is a British rally co-driver who competes alongside Oliver Solberg in the World Rally Championship (WRC) for Toyota Gazoo Racing.

== Rally results ==
Year	Entrant	Car	1	2	3	4	5	6	7	8	9	10	11	12	13	14	WDC	Points
2013	John Pritchard	Ford Fiesta ST	MON	SWE	MEX	POR	ARG	GRE	ITA	FIN	GER	AUS	FRA	ESP	GBR; Ret		NC	0
2015	Gus Greensmith	Ford Fiesta R2T	MON	SWE	MEX	ARG	POR; 36	ITA	POL; 40	FIN; Ret	GER; Ret	AUS	FRA	ESP; 57	GBR		NC	0
2016	Opel Rallye Junior Team	Opel Adam R2	MON	SWE	MEX	ARG	POR	ITA	POL	FIN	GER; Ret	CHN; C	FRA	ESP			NC	0
2016	Chris Ingram	Vauxhall Adam R2													GBR; 48	AUS	NC	0
2017	Callum Black	Ford Fiesta R5	MON	SWE	MEX	FRA	ARG	POR	ITA	POL	FIN	GER	ESP	GBR; 30	AUS		NC	0
2018	Rhys Yates	Škoda Fabia R5	MON	SWE	MEX	FRA	ARG	POR	ITA	FIN	GER	TUR	GBR; Ret				NC	0
2018	Toksport WRT	Škoda Fabia R5												ESP; 29	AUS		NC	0
2019	M-Sport Ford WRT	Ford Fiesta R5	MON; 7	SWE; 19	MEX	FRA	ARG; 15	CHL; 12		ITA; 42							16th	9
2019	M-Sport Ford WRT	Ford Fiesta WRC							POR; Ret		FIN; Ret	GER; 9					16th	9
2019	M-Sport Ford WRT	Ford Fiesta R5 Mk. II											TUR; 10	GBR; 33	ESP; 15	AUS; C	16th	9
2020	M-Sport Ford WRT	Ford Fiesta WRC	MON; 63	SWE	MEX; 9	EST; 8	TUR; 5	ITA; 25	MNZ; Ret								11th	16
2021	M-Sport Ford WRT	Ford Fiesta WRC	MON; 8	ARC; 9	CRO	POR	ITA	KEN	EST	BEL							14th	18
2021	Toksport WRT	Škoda Fabia R5 Evo									GRE; 9	FIN	ESP				14th	18
2021	Hyundai 2C Competition	Hyundai i20 Coupe WRC												MNZ; 5			14th	18
2022	Hyundai Shell Mobis WRT	Hyundai i20 N Rally1	MON; Ret	SWE; 6	CRO; Ret		ITA	KEN; 10	EST; 13	FIN; Ret	BEL; 4	GRE	NZL; 5	ESP	JPN		13th	33
2022	Hyundai Motorsport N	Hyundai i20 N Rally2				POR; 47											13th	33
2023	Oliver Solberg	Škoda Fabia RS Rally2	MON; 14	SWE; 8	MEX; 8	CRO; 10	POR; 7	ITA; 44	KEN; 9	EST; 38	FIN; 6	GRE; Ret	CHL; 6	EUR	JPN		10th	33
2024	Toksport WRT	Škoda Fabia RS Rally2	MON; 40	SWE; 5	KEN; 7	CRO	POR; Ret	ITA; DNS	POL; 10	LAT; 10	FIN; 5	GRE	CHL; 11	EUR; 7	JPN		13th	27
2025	Printsport	Toyota GR Yaris Rally2	MON; 15	SWE; 9	KEN; 12	ESP; 16	POR; 10	ITA; 6	GRE; 6		FIN; 49	PAR; 7	CHL; 9	EUR; 8	JPN; 7	SAU; 10	9th	71
2025	Toyota Gazoo Racing WRT	Toyota GR Yaris Rally1								EST; 1							9th	71

* Season still in progress.
