= Jan Solans =

Spanish rally driver

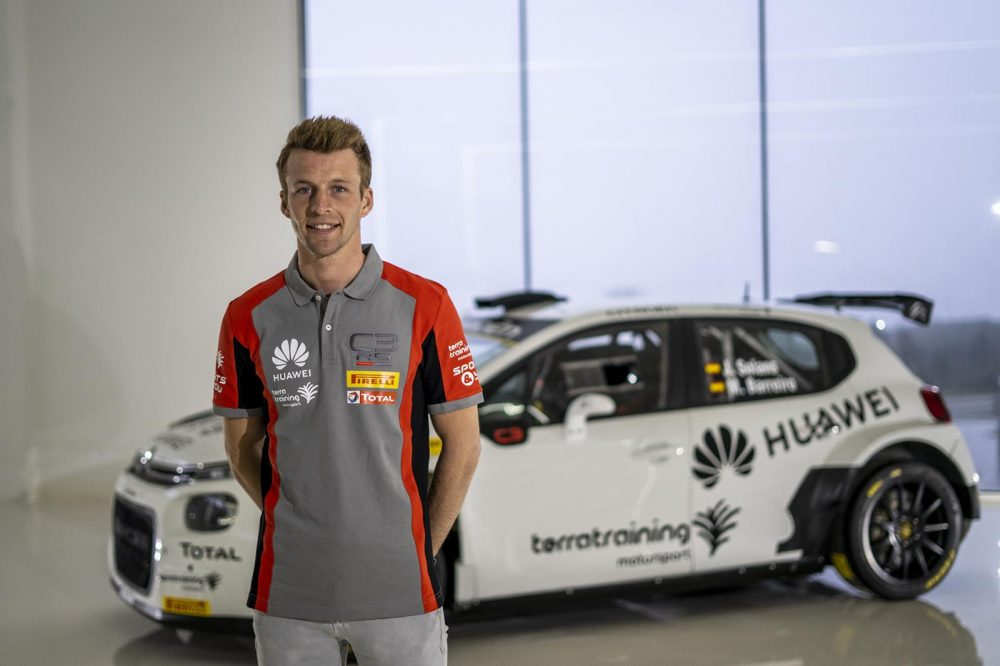
- Solans in 2021.

Personal information
- Nationality: Spain
- Full name: Jan Solans Baldó
- Born: 25 December 1997 (age 28); Matadepera, Spain

World Rally Championship record
- Years active: 2017–2022, 2024–present
- Rallies: 30
- Championships: 0
- Rally wins: 0
- Podiums: 0
- Stage wins: 0
- Total points: 16
- First rally: 2017 Rally Catalunya
- Last rally: 2025 Rally Finland
- Last updated on: 13 August 2025.

Jan Solans Baldó (Note: In this Spanish name, the first or paternal surname is Solans and the second or maternal family name is Baldó.) (born 25 December 1997) is a Spanish rally driver. He won the 2019 Junior World Rally Championship, Spanish champion of Group N in 2016, champion of two-wheel drive and Group R2 in the Spanish Rally Championship Gravel in 2018 and winner of the Iberian Rally Trophy in 2016.

Solans is the younger brother of Nil Solans, who is also a rally driver.

== Results ==
=== WRC results ===
Year	Entrant	Car	1	2	3	4	5	6	7	8	9	10	11	12	13	14	WDC	Points
2017	Escudería Motor Terrassa	Ford Fiesta R2T	MON	SWE	MEX	FRA	ARG	POR	ITA	POL	FIN	GER	ESP; 41	GBR	AUS		NC	0
2018	Escudería Motor Terrassa	Peugeot 208 R2	MON	SWE	MEX	FRA	ARG	POR; Ret	ITA	FIN	GER	TUR	GBR	ESP; 26	AUS		NC	0
2019	Rally Team Spain	Ford Fiesta R2	MON	SWE; 33	MEX	FRA; 28	ARG	CHL	POR	ITA; 21	FIN; 18	GER	TUR	GBR; 21			NC	0
2019	Jan Solans	Ford Fiesta R5 Mk. II													ESP; 22	AUS; C	NC	0
2020	Jan Solans	Ford Fiesta R5 Mk. II	MON	SWE	MEX	EST; 26	TUR; 14	ITA; Ret	MNZ								NC	0
2021	Jan Solans	Citroën C3 Rally2	MON	ARC	CRO	POR; Ret	ITA; 9	KEN	EST	BEL	GRE	FIN	ESP; Ret	MNZ			26th	2
2022	Jan Solans	Citroën C3 Rally2	MON	SWE	CRO	POR; 43	ITA; 9	KEN	EST	FIN	BEL	GRE	NZL	ESP; 19	JPN		31st	2
2024	Jan Solans	Toyota GR Yaris Rally2	MON; 14	SWE; 22	KEN	CRO	POR; 8	ITA; 8	POL	LAT	FIN; 15	GRE; 11	CHL; 16	EUR	JPN; 23		22nd	6
2025	PH.ph	Toyota GR Yaris Rally2	MON	SWE	KEN; 7	ESP	POR; 14	ITA; 12	GRE; 21	EST	FIN	PAR	CHL; 11	EUR	JPN; 10	SAU; Ret	16th	7
2026	PH.ph	Toyota GR Yaris Rally2	MON	SWE	KEN	CRO	ESP; 21	POR	JPN; Ret	GRE; 13	EST; 39	FIN	PAR	CHL	ITA; Ret	SAU; C	NC	0

* Season still in progress.

=== WRC-2 results ===
Year	Entrant	Car	1	2	3	4	5	6	7	8	9	10	11	12	13	14	WDC	Points
2019	Jan Solans	Ford Fiesta R5 Mk. II	MON	SWE	MEX	FRA	ARG	CHL	POR	ITA	FIN	GER	TUR	GBR	ESP; 10	AUS; C	48th	1
2022	Jan Solans	Citroën C3 Rally2	MON	SWE	CRO	POR; 21	ITA; 2	KEN	EST	FIN	BEL	GRE	NZL	ESP; 9	JPN		19th	21
2024	Jan Solans	Toyota GR Yaris Rally2	MON; 6	SWE; 12	KEN	CRO	POR; 1	ITA; 3	POL	LAT	FIN	GRE; 8	CHL; 9	EUR	JPN; 11		8th	54
2025	PH.ph	Toyota GR Yaris Rally2	MON	SWE	KEN; 2	ESP	POR; 5	ITA; 4	GRE; 14	EST	FIN	PAR	CHL; 3	EUR	JPN; 3	SAU; C	5th	69
2026	PH.ph	Toyota GR Yaris Rally2	MON	SWE	KEN	CRO	ESP; 7	POR; 4	JPN	GRE; 8	EST; 20	FIN	PAR	CHL	ITA; Ret	SAU; C	18th	22

* Season still in progress.

=== WRC-3 results ===
Year	Entrant	Car	1	2	3	4	5	6	7	8	9	10	11	12	WDC	Points
2020	Jan Solans	Ford Fiesta R5 Mk. II	MON	SWE	MEX	EST; 12	TUR; 6	ITA; Ret	MNZ						24th	8
2021	Jan Solans	Citroën C3 Rally2	MON	ARC	CRO	POR; Ret	ITA; 3	KEN	EST	BEL	GRE	FIN	ESP; Ret	MNZ	24th	16

=== JWRC results ===
Year	Entrant	Car	1	2	3	4	5	WDC	Points
2019	Rally Team Spain	Ford Fiesta R2	SWE; 3	FRA; 4	ITA; 1	FIN; 2	GBR; 1	1st	139
