= 2024 Rally Poland =

80th edition of Rally Poland

2024 Rally Poland ORLEN 80th Rally Poland 2024
Round 7 of 13 in the 2024 World Rally Championship
← Previous event	Next event →
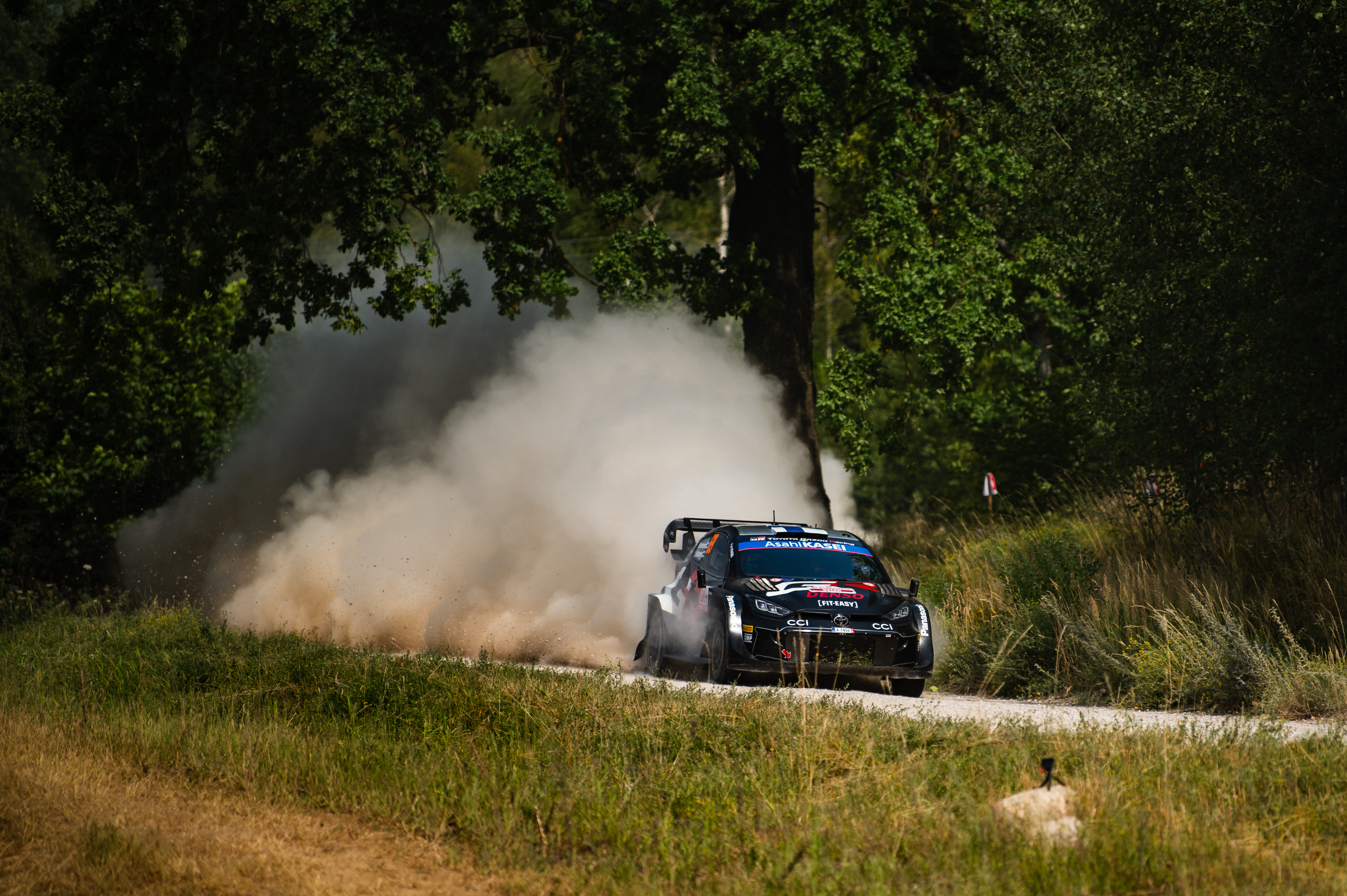
- Kalle Rovanperä and Jonne Halttunen during SS17 of Orlen 80th Rally Poland.
- Host country: Poland
- Rally base: Mikołajki, Warmian–Masurian
- Dates run: 27 – 30 June 2024
- Start location: Mikołajki, Warmian–Masurian
- Finish location: Mikołajki, Warmian–Masurian
- Stages: 19 (304.10 km; 188.96 miles)
- Stage surface: Gravel
- Transport distance: 1,071.46 km (665.77 miles)
- Overall distance: 1,375.56 km (854.73 miles)

Statistics
- Crews registered: 44
- Crews: 42 at start, 40 at finish

Overall results
- Overall winner: (Finland) Kalle Rovanperä (Finland) Jonne Halttunen (Japan) Toyota Gazoo Racing WRT; 2:33:07.6
- Saturday Overall leader: (Finland) Kalle Rovanperä (Finland) Jonne Halttunen (Japan) Toyota Gazoo Racing WRT; 2:00:44.0
- Sunday Accumulated leader: (Estonia) Ott Tänak (Estonia) Martin Järveoja (South Korea) Hyundai Shell Mobis WRT; 32:19.1
- Power Stage winner: (Belgium) Thierry Neuville (Belgium) Martijn Wydaeghe (South Korea) Hyundai Shell Mobis WRT; 5:27.6

Support category results
- WRC-2 winner: (Finland) Sami Pajari (Finland) Enni Mälkönen (Finland) Printsport; 2:40:58.3
- WRC-3 winner: (Paraguay) Diego Dominguez Jr. (Spain) Rogelio Peñate; 2:53:28.9

The 2024 Rally Poland (also known as the ORLEN 80th Rally Poland 2024) was a motor racing event for rally cars that was held over four days from 27 to 30 June 2024. It marked the eightieth running of the Rally Poland, and was the seventh round of the 2024 World Rally Championship, World Rally Championship-2 and World Rally Championship-3. The 2024 event was based in Mikołajki in Warmian–Masurian Voivodeship, and was contested over nineteen special stages, covering a total competitive distance of 304.10 km (188.96 mi).

Thierry Neuville and Nicolas Gilsoul were the defending rally winners, their team, Hyundai Shell Mobis WRT, were the defending manufacturer's winners, both of them in the WRC class.

Kalle Rovanperä and Jonne Halttunen won the rally, and their team, Toyota Gazoo Racing WRT, won the manufacturer's titles. Sami Pajari and Enni Mälkönen won the World Rally Championship-2 category. Diego Dominguez Jr. and Rogelio Peñate won the World Rally Championship-3 category.

After breaking the Mikolajki Arena stage record, the crew of Tänak and Järveoja was forced to retire on the second stage when they crashed onto a deer at 189 kilometres per hour (117 mph). Being first on the road, they still managed to win Super Sunday.

== Background ==
=== Entry list ===
The following crews entered into the rally. The event was opened to crews competing in the World Rally Championship, its support categories, the World Rally Championship-2, World Rally Championship-3 and privateer entries that were not registered to score points in any championship. Nine entered under Rally1 regulations, as were twenty-three Rally2 crews in the World Rally Championship-2 and ten Rally3 crew in the World Rally Championship-3.

Eight-time World Rally Champion Sébastien Ogier and his current co-driver Vincent Landais were to compete at the rally but were forced to withdraw after a traffic accident with a Ford Mondeo during a recce. Both the crew and passengers of the Mondeo were hospitalised. No one sustained any serious injuries initially, however the driver of the Mondeo died a week later. Fellow Toyota teammate Kalle Rovanperä and his co-driver Jonne Halttunen were immediately called upon to fill in for Ogier as a last-minute replacement following a decision from both the FIA and rally organisers.

Rally1 entries competing in the World Rally Championship
No.	Driver	Co-Driver	Entrant	Car	Championship eligibility	Tyre
8	(Estonia) Ott Tänak	(Estonia) Martin Järveoja	(South Korea) Hyundai Shell Mobis WRT	Hyundai i20 N Rally1	Driver, Co-driver, Manufacturer	P
9	(Norway) Andreas Mikkelsen	(Norway) Torstein Eriksen	(South Korea) Hyundai Shell Mobis WRT	Hyundai i20 N Rally1	Driver, Co-driver, Manufacturer	P
11	(Belgium) Thierry Neuville	(Belgium) Martijn Wydaeghe	(South Korea) Hyundai Shell Mobis WRT	Hyundai i20 N Rally1	Driver, Co-driver, Manufacturer	P
13	(Luxembourg) Grégoire Munster	(Belgium) Louis Louka	(United Kingdom) M-Sport Ford WRT	Ford Puma Rally1	Driver, Co-driver, Manufacturer	P
16	(France) Adrien Fourmaux	(France) Alexandre Coria	(United Kingdom) M-Sport Ford WRT	Ford Puma Rally1	Driver, Co-driver, Manufacturer	P
18	(Japan) Takamoto Katsuta	(Republic of Ireland) Aaron Johnston	(Japan) Toyota Gazoo Racing WRT	Toyota GR Yaris Rally1	Driver, Co-driver, Manufacturer	P
22	(Latvia) Mārtiņš Sesks	(Latvia) Renārs Francis	(United Kingdom) M-Sport Ford WRT	Ford Puma Rally1	Driver, Co-driver	P
33	(United Kingdom) Elfyn Evans	(United Kingdom) Scott Martin	(Japan) Toyota Gazoo Racing WRT	Toyota GR Yaris Rally1	Driver, Co-driver, Manufacturer	P
69	(Finland) Kalle Rovanperä	(Finland) Jonne Halttunen	(Japan) Toyota Gazoo Racing WRT	Toyota GR Yaris Rally1	Driver, Co-driver, Manufacturer	P

Rally2 entries competing in the World Rally Championship-2
No.	Driver	Co-Driver	Entrant	Car	Championship eligibility	Tyre
20	(Sweden) Oliver Solberg	(United Kingdom) Elliott Edmondson	(Germany) Toksport WRT	Škoda Fabia RS Rally2	Driver, Co-driver, Team	P
21	(Finland) Sami Pajari	(Finland) Enni Mälkönen	(Finland) Printsport	Toyota GR Yaris Rally2	Challenger Driver, Challenger Co-driver	P
23	(Bulgaria) Nikolay Gryazin	Konstantin Aleksandrov (Note: Konstantin Aleksandrov is Russian, but he competes as a neutral competitor using the ANA flag as Russian national emblems were banned by the association due to the Russian invasion of Ukraine.)	(Belgium) DG Sport Compétition	Citroën C3 Rally2	Challenger Driver, Challenger Co-driver	P
24	(Finland) Lauri Joona	(Finland) Janni Hussi	(Finland) Lauri Joona	Škoda Fabia RS Rally2	Challenger Driver, Challenger Co-driver	P
25	(United Kingdom) Gus Greensmith	(Sweden) Jonas Andersson	(Germany) Toksport WRT	Škoda Fabia RS Rally2	Driver, Co-driver, Team	P
26	(Poland) Kajetan Kajetanowicz	(Poland) Maciej Szczepaniak	(Poland) Kajetan Kajetanowicz	Škoda Fabia RS Rally2	Challenger Driver, Challenger Co-driver	P
27	(Republic of Ireland) Josh McErlean	(Republic of Ireland) James Fulton	(Germany) Toksport WRT 2	Škoda Fabia RS Rally2	Challenger Driver, Challenger Co-driver, Team	P
28	(Finland) Roope Korhonen	(Finland) Anssi Viinikka	(Finland) Roope Korhonen	Toyota GR Yaris Rally2	Challenger Driver, Challenger Co-driver	P
29	(Estonia) Georg Linnamäe	(United Kingdom) James Morgan	(Estonia) Georg Linnamäe	Toyota GR Yaris Rally2	Challenger Driver, Challenger Co-driver	P
30	(Czech Republic) Martin Prokop	(Czech Republic) Michal Ernst	(Czech Republic) Martin Prokop	Škoda Fabia RS Rally2	Challenger Driver, Challenger Co-driver	P
31	(Italy) Roberto Daprà	(Italy) Luca Guglielmetti	(Italy) Roberto Daprà	Škoda Fabia Rally2 evo	Challenger Driver, Challenger Co-driver	P
32	(Estonia) Robert Virves	(Estonia) Aleks Lesk	(Estonia) Robert Virves	Škoda Fabia RS Rally2	Challenger Driver, Challenger Co-driver	P
34	(Germany) Armin Kremer	(Germany) Ella Kremer	(Germany) Armin Kremer	Škoda Fabia RS Rally2	Challenger/Masters Driver, Challenger Co-driver	P
35	(Poland) Michał Sołowow	(Poland) Maciej Baran	(Finland) Printsport	Škoda Fabia RS Rally2	Challenger/Masters Driver, Challenger Co-driver	P
36	(France) Pierre-Louis Loubet	(France) Loris Pascaud	(Germany) Toksport WRT 2	Škoda Fabia RS Rally2	Driver, Co-driver, Team	P
37	(Finland) Teemu Suninen	(Finland) Mikko Markkula	(Finland) Teemu Suninen	Hyundai i20 N Rally2	Driver, Co-driver	P
38	(Poland) Mikołaj Marczyk	(Poland) Szymon Gospodarczyk	(Poland) Mikołaj Marczyk	Škoda Fabia RS Rally2	Challenger Driver, Challenger Co-driver	P
39	(Poland) Adrian Chwietczuk	(Poland) Damian Syty	(Poland) Adrian Chwietczuk	Škoda Fabia RS Rally2	Challenger Driver, Challenger Co-driver	P
40	(Estonia) Gregor Jeets	(Estonia) Timo Taniel	(Estonia) Gregor Jeets	Toyota GR Yaris Rally2	Challenger Driver, Challenger Co-driver	P
41	(Poland) Jarosław Kołtun	(Poland) Ireneusz Pleskot	(Poland) Jarosław Kołtun	Škoda Fabia RS Rally2	Challenger Driver, Challenger Co-driver	P
43	(Mexico) Ricardo Triviño	(Spain) Diego Fuentes Vega	(Mexico) Ricardo Triviño	Škoda Fabia RS Rally2	Challenger/Masters Driver, Challenger Co-driver	P
44	(Turkey) Uğur Soylu	(Turkey) Sener Guray	(Turkey) Uğur Soylu	Škoda Fabia RS Rally2	Challenger/Masters Driver, Challenger Co-driver	P
45	(Poland) Wojciech Musiał	(Poland) Konrad Dudziński	(Poland) Wojciech Musiał	Škoda Fabia Rally2 evo	Challenger/Masters Driver, Challenger Co-driver	P

Rally3 entries competing in the World Rally Championship-3
No.	Driver	Co-Driver	Entrant	Car	Tyre
46	(Paraguay) Diego Dominguez Jr.	(Spain) Rogelio Peñate	(Paraguay) Diego Dominguez Jr.	Ford Fiesta Rally3	P
47	(Czech Republic) Jan Černý	(Czech Republic) Ondřej Krajča	(Czech Republic) Jan Černý	Ford Fiesta Rally3	P
48	(France) Mattéo Chatillon	(France) Maxence Cornuau	(France) Mattéo Chatillon	Renault Clio Rally3	P
49	(Bolivia) Bruno Bulacia	(Brazil) Gabriel Morales	(Bolivia) Bruno Bulacia	Ford Fiesta Rally3	P
50	(Bolivia) Nataniel Bruun	(Argentina) Pablo Olmos	(Bolivia) Nataniel Bruun	Ford Fiesta Rally3	P
51	(Poland) Jakub Matulka	(Poland) Daniel Dymurski	(Poland) Jakub Matulka	Ford Fiesta Rally3	P
52	(Poland) Gracjan Predko	(Poland) Michał Jurgała	(Poland) Gracjan Predko	Renault Clio Rally3	P
53	(Poland) Grzegorz Bonder	(Poland) Paweł Pochroń	(Poland) Grzegorz Bonder	Ford Fiesta Rally3	P
54	(Poland) Marek Roefler	(Poland) Marek Bała	(Poland) Dantex Rally Team	Ford Fiesta Rally3	P
55	(Poland) Paweł Ważny	(Poland) Bartosz Dzienis	(Poland) Paweł Ważny	Ford Fiesta Rally3	P

=== Itinerary ===
All dates and times are CEST (UTC+2).

Date	No.	Time span	Stage name	Distance
27 June	—	After 10:01	Lubiewo [Shakedown]	5.10 km
27 June		After 17:00	Opening ceremony, Mikołajki	—N/a
27 June	SS1	After 19:05	Mikołajki Arena 1	2.50 km
28 June	SS2	After 8:45	Stańczyki 1	29.40 km
28 June	SS3	After 10:20	Wieliczki 1	12.90 km
28 June	SS4	After 11:10	Olecko 1	13.20 km
28 June		12:00 – 12:40	Regroup, Olecko	—N/a
28 June		12:40 – 12:55	Tyre fitting zone, Olecko	—N/a
28 June	SS5	After 14:05	Stańczyki 2	29.40 km
28 June	SS6	After 15:40	Wieliczki 2	12.90 km
28 June	SS7	After 16:30	Olecko 2	13.20 km
28 June		18:27 – 18:57	Regroup, Mikołajki	—N/a
28 June	SS8	After 19:00	Mikołajki Arena 2	2.50 km
28 June		19:30 – 20:15	Flexi service A, Mikołajki	—N/a
29 June	SS9	After 8:30	Świętajno 1	18.50 km
29 June	SS10	After 9:45	Gołdap 1	19.90 km
29 June	SS11	After 10:35	Świętajno 1	22.40 km
29 June	SS12	After 13:35	Mikołajki Arena 3	2.50 km
29 June		13:45 – 14:00	Regroup, Mikołajki	—N/a
29 June		14:00 – 14:40	Service B, Mikołajki	—N/a
29 June	SS13	After 16:00	Świętajno 2	18.50 km
29 June	SS14	After 17:15	Gołdap 2	19.90 km
29 June	SS15	After 18:05	Świętajno 2	22.40 km
29 June		20:55 – 21:40	Flexi service C, Mikołajki	—N/a
30 June	SS16	After 9:00	Gmina Mrągowo 1	20.80 km
30 June	SS17	After 10:05	Mikołajki 1	11.20 km
30 June		10:30 – 11:20	Regroup, Mikołajki	—N/a
30 June	SS18	After 12:20	Gmina Mrągowo 2	20.80 km
30 June		13:20 – 14:05	Regroup, Mikołajki	—N/a
30 June	SS19	After 14:15	Mikołajki 2 [Power Stage]	11.20 km
30 June		After 14:35	Finish, Mikołajki	—N/a
30 June		After 15:15	Podium ceremony, Mikołajki	—N/a

== Report ==
=== WRC Rally1 ===
==== Classification ====
Position		No.	Driver	Co-driver	Entrant	Car	Time	Difference	Points			
Event	Class	No.	Driver	Co-driver	Entrant	Car	Time	Difference	SAT	SUN	WPS	Total
1	1	69	Kalle Rovanperä	Jonne Halttunen	Toyota Gazoo Racing WRT	Toyota GR Yaris Rally1	2:33:07.6	0.0	18	6	3	27
2	2	33	Elfyn Evans	Scott Martin	Toyota Gazoo Racing WRT	Toyota GR Yaris Rally1	2:33:35.9	+28.3	13	4	0	17
3	3	16	Adrien Fourmaux	Alexandre Coria	M-Sport Ford WRT	Ford Puma Rally1	2:33:50.3	+42.7	10	5	2	17
4	4	11	Thierry Neuville	Martijn Wydaeghe	Hyundai Shell Mobis WRT	Hyundai i20 N Rally1	2:34:18.4	+1:10.8	6	3	5	14
5	5	22	Mārtiņš Sesks	Renārs Francis	M-Sport Ford WRT	Ford Puma Rally1	2:34:54.6	+1:47.0	8	1	0	9
6	6	9	Andreas Mikkelsen	Torstein Eriksen	Hyundai Shell Mobis WRT	Hyundai i20 N Rally1	2:35:24.2	+2:16.6	15	0	0	15
7	7	13	Grégoire Munster	Louis Louka	M-Sport Ford WRT	Ford Puma Rally1	2:35:25.6	+2:18.0	4	0	0	4
8	8	18	Takamoto Katsuta	Aaron Johnston	Toyota Gazoo Racing WRT	Toyota GR Yaris Rally1	2:35:34.3	+2:26.7	3	2	1	6
40	9	8	Ott Tänak	Martin Järveoja	Hyundai Shell Mobis WRT	Hyundai i20 N Rally1	4:12:54.6	+1:39:47.0	0	7	4	11

==== Special stages ====
Stage	Winners	Car	Time	Class leaders
SD	Tänak / Järveoja	Hyundai i20 N Rally1	2:12.5	—N/a
SS1	Tänak / Järveoja	Hyundai i20 N Rally1	1:42.5	Tänak / Järveoja
SS2	Mikkelsen / Eriksen	Hyundai i20 N Rally1	14:54.7	Mikkelsen / Eriksen
SS3	Neuville / Wydaeghe	Hyundai i20 N Rally1	5:56.0	Mikkelsen / Eriksen
SS4	Mikkelsen / Eriksen	Hyundai i20 N Rally1	7:27.5	Mikkelsen / Eriksen
SS5	Rovanperä / Halttunen	Toyota GR Yaris Rally1	14:32.5	Rovanperä / Halttunen
SS6	Neuville / Wydaeghe	Hyundai i20 N Rally1	5:49.3	Mikkelsen / Eriksen
SS7	Fourmaux / Coria	Ford Puma Rally1	7:16.7	Mikkelsen / Eriksen
SS8	Katsuta / Johnston	Toyota GR Yaris Rally1	1:43.4	Mikkelsen / Eriksen
SS9	Rovanperä / Halttunen	Toyota GR Yaris Rally1	9:21.9	Mikkelsen / Eriksen
SS10	Rovanperä / Halttunen	Toyota GR Yaris Rally1	9:33.9	Rovanperä / Halttunen
SS11	Mikkelsen / Eriksen	Hyundai i20 N Rally1	10:53.8	Rovanperä / Halttunen
SS12	Rovanperä / Halttunen	Toyota GR Yaris Rally1	1:40.8	Rovanperä / Halttunen
SS13	Rovanperä / Halttunen	Toyota GR Yaris Rally1	9:17.5	Rovanperä / Halttunen
SS14	Rovanperä / Halttunen	Toyota GR Yaris Rally1	9:25.2	Rovanperä / Halttunen
SS15	Rovanperä / Halttunen	Toyota GR Yaris Rally1	10:43.0	Rovanperä / Halttunen
SS16	Tänak / Järveoja	Hyundai i20 N Rally1	10:43.5	Rovanperä / Halttunen
SS17	Tänak / Järveoja	Hyundai i20 N Rally1	5:37.0	Rovanperä / Halttunen
SS18	Rovanperä / Halttunen	Toyota GR Yaris Rally1	10:28.8	Rovanperä / Halttunen
SS19	Neuville / Wydaeghe	Hyundai i20 N Rally1	5:27.6	Rovanperä / Halttunen

==== Championship standings ====
Pos.	Drivers' championships			Co-drivers' championships			Manufacturers' championships		
Pos.	Move	Driver	Points	Move	Co-driver	Points	Move	Manufacturer	Points
1		Thierry Neuville	136		Martijn Wydaeghe	136		Hyundai Shell Mobis WRT	311
2	1	Elfyn Evans	121	1	Scott Martin	121		Toyota Gazoo Racing WRT	301
3	1	Ott Tänak	115	1	Martin Järveoja	115		M-Sport Ford WRT	156
4		Sébastien Ogier	92		Vincent Landais	92			
5		Adrien Fourmaux	91		Alexandre Coria	91			

=== WRC-2 Rally2 ===
==== Classification ====
Position		No.	Driver	Co-driver	Entrant	Car	Time	Difference	Points	
Event	Class	No.	Driver	Co-driver	Entrant	Car	Time	Difference	Class	Event
9	1	25	Sami Pajari	Enni Mälkönen	Printsport	Toyota GR Yaris Rally2	2:40:58.3	0.0	25	2
10	2	25	Oliver Solberg	Elliott Edmondson	Toksport WRT	Škoda Fabia RS Rally2	2:41:20.3	+22.0	18	1
11	3	46	Robert Virves	Aleks Lesk	Robert Virves	Škoda Fabia RS Rally2	2:42:21.6	+1:23.3	15	0
12	4	27	Georg Linnamäe	James Morgan	Georg Linnamäe	Toyota GR Yaris Rally2	2:42:22.2	+1:23.9	12	0
13	5	40	Pierre-Louis Loubet	Loris Pascaud	Toksport WRT 2	Škoda Fabia RS Rally2	2:42:25.2	+1:26.9	10	0
14	6	23	Nikolay Gryazin	Konstantin Aleksandrov	DG Sport Compétition	Citroën C3 Rally2	2:42:30.4	+1:32.1	8	0
15	7	26	Lauri Joona	Janni Hussi	Lauri Joona	Škoda Fabia RS Rally2	2:42:34.3	+1:36.0	6	0
16	8	28	Roope Korhonen	Anssi Viinikka	Roope Korhonen	Toyota GR Yaris Rally2	2:42:35.0	+1:36.7	4	0
17	9	25	Gus Greensmith	Jonas Andersson	Toksport WRT	Škoda Fabia RS Rally2	2:43:13.1	+2:14.8	2	0
18	10	38	Mikołaj Marczyk	Szymon Gospodarczyk	Mikołaj Marczyk	Škoda Fabia RS Rally2	2:43:24.2	+2:25.9	1	0
19	11	41	Teemu Suninen	Mikko Markkula	Teemu Suninen	Hyundai i20 N Rally2	2:43:24.2	+2:25.9	0	0
20	12	48	Martin Prokop	Michal Ernst	Martin Prokop	Škoda Fabia RS Rally2	2:45:31.0	+4:32.7	0	0
21	13	34	Roberto Daprà	Luca Guglielmetti	Roberto Daprà	Škoda Fabia Rally2 evo	2:47:00.3	+6:02.0	0	0
22	14	37	Armin Kremer	Ella Kremer	Armin Kremer	Škoda Fabia RS Rally2	2:52:07.2	+11:08.9	0	0
27	15	35	Michał Sołowow	Maciej Baran	Printsport	Škoda Fabia RS Rally2	2:54:53.7	+13:55.4	0	0
28	16	41	Jarosław Kołtun	Ireneusz Pleskot	Jarosław Kołtun	Škoda Fabia RS Rally2	2:58:49.7	+17:51.4	0	0
30	17	54	Ricardo Triviño	Diego Fuentes Vega	Ricardo Triviño	Škoda Fabia RS Rally2	2:59:57.1	+18:58.8	0	0
32	18	59	Uğur Soylu	Sener Guray	Uğur Soylu	Škoda Fabia RS Rally2	3:01:33.5	+20:35.2	0	0
35	19	28	Kajetan Kajetanowicz	Maciej Szczepaniak	Kajetan Kajetanowicz	Škoda Fabia RS Rally2	3:43:39.0	+1:02:40.7	0	0
37	20	45	Wojciech Musiał	Konrad Dudziński	Wojciech Musiał	Škoda Fabia Rally2 evo	4:01:28.1	+1:20:29.8	0	0
Retired SS17		47	Josh McErlean	James Fulton	Toksport WRT 2	Škoda Fabia RS Rally2	Accident		0	0
Retired SS18		40	Gregor Jeets	Timo Taniel	Gregor Jeets	Toyota GR Yaris Rally2	Mechanical		0	0

==== Special stages ====
Overall
Stage	Winners	Car	Time	Class leaders
SD	Gryazin / Aleksandrov	Citroën C3 Rally2	2:24.1	—N/a
SS1	Solberg / Edmondson	Škoda Fabia RS Rally2	1:48.2	Solberg / Edmondson
SS2	Pajari / Mälkönen	Toyota GR Yaris Rally2	15:35.4	Pajari / Mälkönen
SS3	Stage cancelled			
SS4	Kajetanowicz / Szczepaniak	Škoda Fabia RS Rally2	7:44.9	Pajari / Mälkönen
SS5	Pajari / Mälkönen	Toyota GR Yaris Rally2	15:17.0	Pajari / Mälkönen
SS6	Kajetanowicz / Szczepaniak	Škoda Fabia RS Rally2	6:11.2	Pajari / Mälkönen
SS7	Stage cancelled			
SS8	Marczyk / Gospodarczyk	Škoda Fabia RS Rally2	1:47.3	Pajari / Mälkönen
SS9	Pajari / Mälkönen	Toyota GR Yaris Rally2	9:49.7	Pajari / Mälkönen
SS10	Pajari / Mälkönen	Toyota GR Yaris Rally2	10:08.8	Pajari / Mälkönen
SS11	Pajari / Mälkönen	Toyota GR Yaris Rally2	11:32.3	Pajari / Mälkönen
SS12	Marczyk / Gospodarczyk	Škoda Fabia RS Rally2	1:44.6	Pajari / Mälkönen
SS13	Pajari / Mälkönen	Toyota GR Yaris Rally2	9:48.7	Pajari / Mälkönen
SS14	Solberg / Edmondson	Škoda Fabia RS Rally2	9:59.8	Pajari / Mälkönen
SS15	Solberg / Edmondson	Škoda Fabia RS Rally2	11:16.9	Pajari / Mälkönen
SS16	Virves / Lesk	Škoda Fabia RS Rally2	11:12.8	Pajari / Mälkönen
SS17	Kajetanowicz / Szczepaniak	Škoda Fabia RS Rally2	5:52.6	Pajari / Mälkönen
SS18	Solberg / Edmondson	Škoda Fabia RS Rally2	11:04.8	Pajari / Mälkönen
SS19	Virves / Lesk	Škoda Fabia RS Rally2	5:50.6	Pajari / Mälkönen

Challenger
Stage	Winners	Car	Time	Class leaders
SD	Gryazin / Aleksandrov	Citroën C3 Rally2	2:24.1	—N/a
SS1	Daprà / Guglielmetti	Škoda Fabia Rally2 evo	1:49.6	Daprà / Guglielmetti
SS2	Pajari / Mälkönen	Toyota GR Yaris Rally2	15:35.4	Pajari / Mälkönen
SS3	Stage cancelled			
SS4	Kajetanowicz / Szczepaniak	Škoda Fabia RS Rally2	7:44.9	Pajari / Mälkönen
SS5	Pajari / Mälkönen	Toyota GR Yaris Rally2	15:17.9	Pajari / Mälkönen
SS6	Kajetanowicz / Szczepaniak	Škoda Fabia RS Rally2	6:11.2	Pajari / Mälkönen
SS7	Stage cancelled			
SS8	Marczyk / Gospodarczyk	Škoda Fabia RS Rally2	1:47.3	Pajari / Mälkönen
SS9	Pajari / Mälkönen	Toyota GR Yaris Rally2	9:49.7	Pajari / Mälkönen
SS10	Pajari / Mälkönen	Toyota GR Yaris Rally2	10:08.8	Pajari / Mälkönen
SS11	Pajari / Mälkönen	Toyota GR Yaris Rally2	11:32.3	Pajari / Mälkönen
SS12	Marczyk / Gospodarczyk	Škoda Fabia RS Rally2	1:44.6	Pajari / Mälkönen
SS13	Pajari / Mälkönen	Toyota GR Yaris Rally2	9:48.7	Pajari / Mälkönen
SS14	Virves / Lesk	Škoda Fabia RS Rally2	10:01.2	Pajari / Mälkönen
SS15	Virves / Lesk	Škoda Fabia RS Rally2	11:21.1	Pajari / Mälkönen
SS16	Virves / Lesk	Škoda Fabia RS Rally2	11:12.8	Pajari / Mälkönen
SS17	Kajetanowicz / Szczepaniak	Škoda Fabia RS Rally2	5:52.6	Pajari / Mälkönen
SS18	Joona / Hussi	Škoda Fabia RS Rally2	11:07.9	Pajari / Mälkönen
SS19	Virves / Lesk	Škoda Fabia RS Rally2	5:50.6	Pajari / Mälkönen

==== Championship standings ====
Pos.	Open Drivers' championships			Open Co-drivers' championships			Teams' championships			Challenger Drivers' championships			Challenger Co-drivers' championships		
Pos.	Move	Driver	Points	Move	Co-driver	Points	Move	Manufacturer	Points	Move	Manufacturer	Points	Move	Driver	Points
1		Yohan Rossel	71	3	Enni Mälkönen	68		DG Sport Compétition	169	1	Sami Pajari	75	1	Enni Mälkönen	75
2	2	Sami Pajari	68	1	Elliott Edmondson	61	1	Toksport WRT	110		Jan Solans	56		Rodrigo Sanjuan de Eusebio	56
3		Oliver Solberg	61	2	Arnaud Dunand	53	1	Toyota Gazoo Racing WRT NG	73	2	Nikolay Gryazin	55	2	Konstantin Aleksandrov	55
4	2	Jan Solans	48	2	Rodrigo Sanjuan de Eusebio	48		Toksport WRT 2	36	2	Lauri Joona	53	2	Janni Hussi	53
5		Nikolay Gryazin	48		Konstantin Aleksandrov	48				2	Nicolas Ciamin	48	2	Yannick Roche	48

=== WRC-3 Rally3 ===
==== Classification ====
Position		No.	Driver	Co-driver	Entrant	Car	Time	Difference	Points
Event	Class	No.	Driver	Co-driver	Entrant	Car	Time	Difference	Points
23	1	46	Diego Dominguez Jr.	Rogelio Peñate	Diego Dominguez Jr.	Ford Fiesta Rally3	2:53:28.9	0.0	25
24	2	51	Jakub Matulka	Daniel Dymurski	Jakub Matulka	Ford Fiesta Rally3	2:53:31.7	+2.8	18
25	3	50	Nataniel Bruun	Pablo Olmos	Nataniel Bruun	Ford Fiesta Rally3	2:54:18.9	+50.0	15
26	4	48	Mattéo Chatillon	Maxence Cornuau	Mattéo Chatillon	Renault Clio Rally3	2:54:41.7	+1:12.8	12
31	5	47	Jan Černý	Ondřej Krajča	Jan Černý	Ford Fiesta Rally3	3:00:45.2	+7:16.3	10
33	6	54	Marek Roefler	Marek Bała	Dantex Rally Team	Ford Fiesta Rally3	3:07:31.9	+14:03.0	8
34	7	55	Paweł Ważny	Bartosz Dzienis	Paweł Ważny	Ford Fiesta Rally3	3:10:10.8	+16:41.9	6
39	8	53	Grzegorz Bonder	Paweł Pochroń	Grzegorz Bonder	Ford Fiesta Rally3	4:11:40.8	+1:18:11.9	4

==== Special stages ====
Stage	Winners	Car	Time	Class leaders
SD	Chatillon / Cornuau	Renault Clio Rally3	2:35.9	—N/a
SS1	Matulka / Dymurski	Ford Fiesta Rally3	1:52.3	Matulka / Dymurski
SS2	Matulka / Dymurski	Ford Fiesta Rally3	16:55.6	Matulka / Dymurski
SS3	Stage cancelled			
SS4	Matulka / Dymurski	Ford Fiesta Rally3	8:24.2	Matulka / Dymurski
SS5	Dominguez Jr. / Peñate	Ford Fiesta Rally3	16:49.2	Matulka / Dymurski
SS6	Matulka / Dymurski	Ford Fiesta Rally3	6:41.6	Matulka / Dymurski
SS7	Stage cancelled			
SS8	Černý / Krajča	Ford Fiesta Rally3	1:51.3	Matulka / Dymurski
SS9	Bruun / Olmos	Ford Fiesta Rally3	10:46.6	Matulka / Dymurski
SS10	Chatillon / Cornuau	Ford Fiesta Rally3	11:03.0	Matulka / Dymurski
SS10	Matulka / Dymurski	Ford Fiesta Rally3	12:31.2	Matulka / Dymurski
SS11	Matulka / Dymurski	Ford Fiesta Rally3	12:31.2	Matulka / Dymurski
SS12	Matulka / Dymurski	Ford Fiesta Rally3	1:49.2	Matulka / Dymurski
SS13	Dominguez Jr. / Peñate	Ford Fiesta Rally3	10:42.6	Matulka / Dymurski
SS14	Dominguez Jr. / Peñate	Ford Fiesta Rally3	10:49.7	Matulka / Dymurski
SS15	Dominguez Jr. / Peñate	Ford Fiesta Rally3	12:13.7	Matulka / Dymurski
SS16	Bruun / Olmos	Ford Fiesta Rally3	12:10.6	Matulka / Dymurski
SS17	Dominguez Jr. / Peñate	Ford Fiesta Rally3	6:22.6	Matulka / Dymurski
SS18	Dominguez Jr. / Peñate	Ford Fiesta Rally3	12:01.3	Dominguez Jr. / Peñate
SS19	Dominguez Jr. / Peñate	Ford Fiesta Rally3	6:16.2	Dominguez Jr. / Peñate

==== Championship standings ====
Pos.	Drivers' championships			Co-drivers' championships		
Pos.	Move	Driver	Points	Move	Co-driver	Points
1		Diego Dominguez Jr.	75		Rogelio Peñate	75
2	2	Mattéo Chatillon	48	2	Maxence Cornuau	48
3		Jan Černý	47		Ondřej Krajča	47
4	2	Romet Jürgenson	43	2	Siim Oja	43
5		Ghjuvanni Rossi	28		Kylian Sarmezan	28

== Notes ==
Previous rally: 2024 Rally Italia Sardegna	2024 FIA World Rally Championship	Next rally: 2024 Rally Latvia
Previous rally: 2023 Rally Poland; WRC round: 2017 Rally Poland	2024 Rally Poland	Next rally: 2025 Rally Poland
