= Wahome =

Wahome is both a Kenyan given name and surname. Notable people with the name include:

== Given name ==
- Wahome Mutahi (1954–2003), Kenyan humorist

== Surname ==
- Alice Wahome (born 1959), Kenyan politician
- Jeremy Wahome (born 1998), Kenyan racing driver
- Maxine Wahome (born 1997), Kenyan racing driver
- QueenArrow (Sylvia Gathoni Wahome; born 1998), Kenyan esports player and content creator
