= 2022 WRC3 Championship =

Motorsport championship

The 2022 FIA WRC3 Championship was the ninth season of WRC3, a rallying championship organised and governed by the Fédération Internationale de l'Automobile as the third-highest tier of international rallying, running in support of the 2022 World Rally Championship. It was open to privateers and teams using cars complying with Group Rally3 regulations.

For the first time, WRC3 was split into Open and Junior championships with driver and co-driver titles awarded within each. The WRC3 Open Championship began in January 2022 with the Rallye Monte-Carlo and concluded in November 2022 with Rally Japan. The WRC3 Junior Championship started in February with Rally Sweden and the five-round championship concluded in September with Acropolis Rally. This was the FIA's new presentation of the previously existing Junior WRC Championship, which reverted to an FIA title in 2023.

In the open championships, Lauri Joona won the drivers' title. In the junior championships, Robert Virves won the drivers' title.

== Calendar ==
A map showing the locations of the rallies of the 2022 championship. Event headquarters are marked with black dots.

The 2022 season was contested over thirteen rounds across Europe, Africa, Oceania, and Asia.

Round	Start date	Finish date	Rally	Rally headquarters	Surface	Stages	Distance	Ref.
1	20 January	23 January	(Monaco) Rallye Automobile Monte Carlo	Monte Carlo, Monaco	Mixed (Note: The Monte Carlo Rally is run on a tarmac and snow surface.)	17	296.03 km	
2	24 February	27 February	Rally Sweden	Umeå, Västerbotten County	Snow	17	264.81 km	
3	21 April	24 April	Croatia Rally	Zagreb	Tarmac	20	291.84 km	
4	19 May	22 May	Rally de Portugal	Matosinhos, Porto	Gravel	21	338.34 km	
5	2 June	5 June	(Italy) Rally Italia Sardegna	Alghero, Sardinia	Gravel	21	307.91 km	
6	23 June	26 June	Safari Rally Kenya	Nairobi	Gravel	19	363.44 km	
7	14 July	17 July	Rally Estonia	Tartu, Tartu County	Gravel	24	314.26 km	
8	4 August	7 August	Rally Finland	Jyväskylä, Central Finland	Gravel	22	322.61 km	
9	18 August	21 August	Ypres Rally Belgium	Ypres, West Flanders	Tarmac	20	281.58 km	
10	8 September	11 September	Acropolis Rally Greece	Lamia, Central Greece	Gravel	16	303.30 km	
11	29 September	2 October	Rally New Zealand	Auckland, North Island	Gravel	17	279.80 km	
12	20 October	23 October	(Spain) RACC Rally Catalunya de España	Salou, Catalonia	Tarmac	19	293.77 km	
13	10 November	13 November	Rally Japan	Toyota, Chūbu region	Tarmac	19	283.27 km	

=== Location changes ===
The headquarters of the Monte Carlo Rally moved from Gap, Hautes-Alpes to Monaco alone. The rally was previously headquartered solely in Monaco in 2006. Rally Sweden returned to the championship after a one-year absence. Because of a lack of snow, the organisers moved the rally headquarters for the first time in WRC history. It relocated from Torsby, Värmland northwards to Umeå in Västerbotten County. The rally was initially scheduled to cover 303.74 km (188.7 mi) in nineteen special stages, but it was reduced to seventeen in a total of 264.81 km (164.5 mi) due to reindeer movements. Rally Italia Sardegna relocated its rally base back to Alghero following a one-off headquarter in Olbia for the 2021 event.

=== Calendar changes ===
Rally New Zealand returned to the championship for the first time since 2012. The rally had also secured a spot in the calendar in 2020, but the event was not held in response to the COVID-19 pandemic. Rally Japan took the final spot in the calendar. It was scheduled as the final round in 2020 and 2021, before being called off due to the COVID-19 pandemic. Rally Mexico had contracts to hold the WRC event in 2022 and 2023, but the rally was not included on the calendar. A national event was held in the bid of a 2023 return. Rally Chile found itself in a similar situation to Mexico as their contract with WRC Promoter GmbH lasted till 2022. Chile had previously hosted the event in 2019. Rally GB was bidding for a 2022 return as the event was planned to hold in Northern Ireland, but the proposal was ultimately failed.

=== WRC3 Junior calendar ===
Round	Dates	Rally
1	24–27 February	Rally Sweden
2	21–24 April	Croatia Rally
3	19–22 May	Rally de Portugal
4	14–17 July	Rally Estonia
5	8–11 September	(Greece) Acropolis Rally

== Entries ==
=== WRC3 Open ===
The following crews officially entered into the 2022 WRC3 Open Championship:

Car	Entrant	Driver name	Co-driver name	Rounds
Ford Fiesta Rally3	(Kenya) Hamza Anwar	(Kenya) Hamza Anwar	(Kenya) Adnan Din	6
Ford Fiesta Rally3	(Italy) Enrico Brazzoli	(Italy) Enrico Brazzoli	(Italy) Manuel Fenoli	1, 3, 5, 9
Ford Fiesta Rally3	(Czech Republic) Jan Černý	(Czech Republic) Jan Černý	(Czech Republic) Petr Černohorský	1, 12
Ford Fiesta Rally3	(Czech Republic) Jan Černý	(Czech Republic) Jan Černý	(Czech Republic) Petr Jindra	3
Ford Fiesta Rally3	(Czech Republic) Jan Černý	(Czech Republic) Jan Černý	(Czech Republic) Tomáš Střeska	5
Ford Fiesta Rally3	(Czech Republic) Jan Černý	(Czech Republic) Jan Černý	(Czech Republic) Jan Tománek	8
Ford Fiesta Rally3	(Czech Republic) Jan Černý	(Czech Republic) Jan Černý	(United Kingdom) Tom Woodburn	9
Ford Fiesta Rally3	(Paraguay) Diego Domínguez Jr.	(Paraguay) Diego Domínguez Jr.	(Spain) Rogelio Peñate	5–6, 10, 12
Ford Fiesta Rally3	(Finland) Tommi Heino	(Finland) Tommi Heino	(Finland) Patric Öhman	8
Ford Fiesta Rally3	(Finland) Toni Herranen	(Finland) Toni Herranen	(Finland) Sebastian Virtanen	8
Ford Fiesta Rally3	(Greece) Panagiotis Ismailos	(Greece) Panagiotis Ismailos	(United Kingdom) Allan Harryman	10
Ford Fiesta Rally3	(Finland) Lauri Joona	(Finland) Lauri Joona	(Finland) Mikael Korhonen	2, 4, 7, 12
Ford Fiesta Rally3	(Finland) Lauri Joona	(Finland) Lauri Joona	(Finland) Tuukka Shemeikka	8
Ford Fiesta Rally3	(Greece) Epameinondas Karanikolas	(Greece) Epameinondas Karanikolas	(Greece) Georgios Kakavas	10
Ford Fiesta Rally3	(Kenya) McRae Kimathi	(Kenya) McRae Kimathi	(Kenya) Mwangi Kioni	2–3, 6–7
Ford Fiesta Rally3	(Kenya) McRae Kimathi	(Kenya) McRae Kimathi	(United Kingdom) Stuart Loudon	4
Ford Fiesta Rally3	(Finland) Roope Korhonen	(Finland) Roope Korhonen	(Finland) Anssi Viinikka	7
Ford Fiesta Rally3	(Hungary) Zoltán László	(Hungary) Zoltán László	(Hungary) Tamás Begala	1
Ford Fiesta Rally3	(Hungary) Zoltán László	(Hungary) Zoltán László	(Hungary) Tamás Kürti	5, 9, 12
Ford Fiesta Rally3	(Hungary) M-Sport Racing Kft	(Hungary) Zoltán László	(Hungary) Tamás Kürti	3
Ford Fiesta Rally3	(Republic of Ireland) Motorsport Ireland Rally Academy	(Republic of Ireland) William Creighton	(Republic of Ireland) Liam Regan	2–4, 7, 10
Ford Fiesta Rally3	(Finland) Sami Pajari	(Finland) Sami Pajari	(Finland) Enni Mälkönen	1–4, 7
Ford Fiesta Rally3	(Croatia) Ivica Siladić	(Croatia) Ivica Siladić	(Croatia) Jasna Durak	3
Ford Fiesta Rally3	(Finland) Henri Timonen	(Finland) Henri Timonen	(Finland) Jussi Kärpijoki	8
Ford Fiesta Rally3	(Kenya) Jeremy Wahome	(Kenya) Jeremy Wahome	(Kenya) Victor Okundi	6
Ford Fiesta Rally3	(Kenya) Maxine Wahome	(Kenya) Maxine Wahome	(Kenya) Murage Waigwa	6

=== WRC3 Junior ===
The following crews officially entered into the 2022 WRC3 Junior Championship:

Car	Entrant	Driver name	Co-driver name	Rounds
Ford Fiesta Rally3	(United Kingdom) Jon Armstrong	(United Kingdom) Jon Armstrong	(Republic of Ireland) Brian Hoy	1–5
Ford Fiesta Rally3	(France) Jean-Baptiste Franceschi	(France) Jean-Baptiste Franceschi	(France) Anthony Gorguilo	1–3
Ford Fiesta Rally3	(Finland) Lauri Joona	(Finland) Lauri Joona	(Finland) Mikael Korhonen	1–5
Ford Fiesta Rally3	(Kenya) McRae Kimathi	(Kenya) McRae Kimathi	(Kenya) Mwangi Kioni	1–2, 4–5
Ford Fiesta Rally3	(Kenya) McRae Kimathi	(Kenya) McRae Kimathi	(United Kingdom) Stuart Loudon	3
Ford Fiesta Rally3	(Republic of Ireland) Motorsport Ireland Rally Academy	(Republic of Ireland) William Creighton	(Republic of Ireland) Liam Regan	1–5
Ford Fiesta Rally3	(Finland) Sami Pajari	(Finland) Sami Pajari	(Finland) Enni Mälkönen	1–5
Ford Fiesta Rally3	(Greece) Panagiotis Roustemis	(Greece) Panagiotis Roustemis	(Greece) Christos Bakloris	1
Ford Fiesta Rally3	(Estonia) Starter Energy Racing	(Estonia) Robert Virves	(Estonia) Aleks Lesk	1–3
Ford Fiesta Rally3	(Estonia) Starter Energy Racing	(Estonia) Robert Virves	(Sweden) Julia Thulin	4–5

== Regulation changes ==
=== Sporting Regulations ===
The following titles will be contested within WRC3 in 2022:

- Open Championship for Drivers
- Open Championship for Co-Drivers
- Championship for Teams
- Junior Championship for Drivers
- Junior Championship for Co-Drivers

In a change from the 2021 season, a teams championship will be contested but drivers will not be obliged to run in one. Points from the highest scoring 4 rounds of 5 entered will be considered for the championship.

The WRC3 Junior championship will be organised by M-Sport Ltd as an arrive-and-drive style competition as previously presented in Junior WRC Championship. Ford Fiesta Rally3 cars will be provided on 5 prescribed rounds for drivers born on or after 1 January 1993. Unlike the rules used in WRC2 Junior, drivers of Junior age who do not register and compete in this fashion will not be eligible for the WRC3 Junior championships.

== Results and standings ==
=== Season summary ===
==== WRC3 Open ====
Round	Event	Winning driver	Winning co-driver	Winning entrant	Winning time	Report	Ref.
1	(Monaco) Rallye Automobile Monte Carlo	(Finland) Sami Pajari	(Finland) Enni Mälkönen	(Finland) Sami Pajari	3:24:39.2	Report	
2	Rally Sweden	(Finland) Lauri Joona	(Finland) Mikael Korhonen	(Finland) Lauri Joona	2:24:33.8	Report	
3	Croatia Rally	(Hungary) Zoltán László	(Hungary) Tamás Kürti	(Hungary) Zoltán László	3:32:47.0	Report	
4	Rally de Portugal	(Finland) Sami Pajari	(Finland) Enni Mälkönen	(Finland) Sami Pajari	4:13:33.2	Report	
5	(Italy) Rally Italia Sardegna	(Czech Republic) Jan Černý	(Czech Republic) Tomáš Střeska	(Czech Republic) Jan Černý	3:44:23.5	Report	
6	Safari Rally Kenya	(Kenya) Maxine Wahome	(Kenya) Murage Waigwa	(Kenya) Maxine Wahome	5:20:21.6	Report	
7	Rally Estonia	(Finland) Sami Pajari	(Finland) Enni Mälkönen	(Finland) Sami Pajari	3:13:58.6	Report	
8	Rally Finland	(Finland) Lauri Joona	(Finland) Tuukka Shemeikka	(Finland) Lauri Joona	2:42:52.5	Report	
9	Ypres Rally Belgium	(Czech Republic) Jan Černý	(United Kingdom) Tom Woodburn	(Czech Republic) Jan Černý	2:53:14.2	Report	
10	Acropolis Rally Greece	(Paraguay) Diego Dominguez Jr	(Spain) Rogelio Peñate	(Paraguay) Diego Domínguez Jr.	4:02:20.1	Report	
11	Rally New Zealand	No WRC3 entries				Report	
12	(Spain) RACC Rally Catalunya de España	(Finland) Lauri Joona	(Finland) Mikael Korhonen	(Finland) Lauri Joona	3:04:36.1	Report	
13	Rally Japan	No WRC3 entries				Report	

==== WRC3 Junior ====
Round	Event	Winning driver	Winning co-driver	Winning entrant	Winning time	Report	Ref.
1	Rally Sweden	(United Kingdom) Jon Armstrong	(Republic of Ireland) Brian Hoy	(United Kingdom) Jon Armstrong	2:24:31.1	Report	
2	Croatia Rally	(Finland) Lauri Joona	(Finland) Mikael Korhonen	(Finland) Lauri Joona	3:07:24.9	Report	
3	Rally de Portugal	(Finland) Sami Pajari	(Finland) Enni Mälkönen	(Finland) Sami Pajari	4:13:33.2	Report	
4	Rally Estonia	(Finland) Sami Pajari	(Finland) Enni Mälkönen	(Finland) Sami Pajari	3:13:58.6	Report	
5	Acropolis Rally Greece	(Estonia) Robert Virves	(Sweden) Julia Thulin	(Estonia) Starter Energy Racing	3:55:38.4	Report	

=== Scoring system ===
Position	1st	2nd	3rd	4th	5th	6th	7th	8th	9th	10th
Points	25	18	15	12	10	8	6	4	2	1

==== Open ====
Crews were only allowed to enter a maximum of 5 events with the 4 best results scoring points in the championship.

==== Junior ====
Points were awarded to the top ten classified finishers. An additional point was given for every stage win. The best four results out of five counted towards the final drivers’ and co-drivers’ standings. However, all points gained from stage wins were retained. Double points were awarded at the season's finale to those with at least 3 previous 2022 JWRC round starts.

=== FIA WRC3 Open Championship for Drivers ===
Pos.	Driver	MON (Monaco)	SWE (Sweden)	CRO (Croatia)	POR (Portugal)	ITA (Italy)	KEN (Kenya)	EST (Estonia)	FIN (Finland)	BEL (Belgium)	GRC (Greece)	NZL (New Zealand)	ESP (Spain)	JPN (Japan)	Total points	Best 4
1	(Finland) Lauri Joona		1		2			2	1				1		111	93
2	(Finland) Sami Pajari	1	4	Ret	1			1							87	87
3	(Czech Republic) Jan Černý	2		WD		1			2	1			2		104	86
4	(Hungary) Zoltán László	Ret		1		2				2			4		73	73
5	(Republic of Ireland) William Creighton		2	4	Ret			3			2				63	63
6	(Kenya) McRae Kimathi		3	Ret	3		3	4							57	57
7	(Italy) Enrico Brazzoli	3		2		Ret				3					48	48
8	(Paraguay) Diego Domínguez Jr.										1		3		40	40
9	(Kenya) Maxine Wahome						1								25	25
10	(Kenya) Jeremy Wahome						2								18	18
11	(Croatia) Ivica Siladić			3											15	15
12	(Finland) Henri Timonen								3						15	15
13	(Greece) Epameinondas Karanikolas										3				15	15
14	(Finland) Toni Herranen								4						12	12
15	(Greece) Panagiotis Ismailos										4				12	12
16	(Finland) Roope Korhonen							5							10	10
Pos.	Driver	MON (Monaco)	SWE (Sweden)	CRO (Croatia)	POR (Portugal)	ITA (Italy)	KEN (Kenya)	EST (Estonia)	FIN (Finland)	BEL (Belgium)	GRC (Greece)	NZL (New Zealand)	ESP (Spain)	JPN (Japan)	Total points	Best 4

Key
Colour	Result
Gold	Winner
Silver	2nd place
Bronze	3rd place
Green	Points finish
Blue	Non-points finish
Blue	Non-classified finish (NC)
Purple	Did not finish (Ret)
Black	Excluded (EX)
Black	Disqualified (DSQ)
White	Did not start (DNS)
White	Cancelled (C)
Blank	Withdrew entry from the event (WD)

=== FIA WRC3 Open Championship for Co-Drivers ===
Pos.	Driver	MON (Monaco)	SWE (Sweden)	CRO (Croatia)	POR (Portugal)	ITA (Italy)	KEN (Kenya)	EST (Estonia)	FIN (Finland)	BEL (Belgium)	GRC (Greece)	NZL (New Zealand)	ESP (Spain)	JPN (Japan)	Total points	Best 4
1	(Finland) Enni Mälkönen	1	4	Ret	1			1							87	87
2	(Finland) Mikael Korhonen		1		2			2					1		76	76
3	(Hungary) Tamás Kürti			1		2				2			4		73	73
4	(Republic of Ireland) Liam Regan		2	4	Ret			3			2				63	63
5	(Italy) Manuel Fenoli	3		2		Ret				3					48	48
6	(Kenya) Mwangi Kioni		3	Ret			3	4							42	42
7	(Spain) Rogelio Peñate										1		3		40	40
8	(Czech Republic) Petr Černohorský	2		WD									2		36	36
9	(Czech Republic) Tomáš Střeska					1									25	25
10	(Kenya) Murage Waigwa						1								25	25
11	(Finland) Tuukka Shemeikka								1						25	25
12	(United Kingdom) Tom Woodburn									1					25	25
13	(Kenya) Victor Okundi						2								18	18
14	(Czech Republic) Jan Tománek								2						18	18
15	(Croatia) Jasna Durak			3											15	15
16	(United Kingdom) Stuart Loudon				3										15	15
17	(Finland) Jussi Kärpijoki								3						15	15
18	(Greece) Georgios Kakavas										3				15	15
19	(Finland) Sebastian Virtanen								4						12	12
20	(United Kingdom) Allan Harryman										4				12	12
21	(Finland) Anssi Viinikka							5							10	10
Pos.	Driver	MON (Monaco)	SWE (Sweden)	CRO (Croatia)	POR (Portugal)	ITA (Italy)	KEN (Kenya)	EST (Estonia)	FIN (Finland)	BEL (Belgium)	GRC (Greece)	NZL (New Zealand)	ESP (Spain)	JPN (Japan)	Total points	Best 4

Key
Colour	Result
Gold	Winner
Silver	2nd place
Bronze	3rd place
Green	Points finish
Blue	Non-points finish
Blue	Non-classified finish (NC)
Purple	Did not finish (Ret)
Black	Excluded (EX)
Black	Disqualified (DSQ)
White	Did not start (DNS)
White	Cancelled (C)
Blank	Withdrew entry from the event (WD)

=== FIA WRC3 Junior Championship for Drivers ===
Pos.	Driver	SWE (Sweden)	CRO (Croatia)	POR (Portugal)	EST (Estonia)	GRC (Greece)	Total Points	Best 4
1	(Estonia) Robert Virves	6	2^{3}	3^{5}	2^{17}	1^{4}	138	130
2	(United Kingdom) Jon Armstrong	1^{5}	4^{5}	4^{8}	3^{3}	2^{6}	127	115
3	(Finland) Sami Pajari	5^{7}	Ret^{8}	1^{6}	1^{4}	5^{6}	111	111
4	(Finland) Lauri Joona	2^{3}	1^{1}	2^{1}	4^{1}	6	95	83
5	(Republic of Ireland) William Creighton	3^{1}	5^{1}	Ret^{1}	5	3	68	68
6	(Kenya) McRae Kimathi	4	Ret	5	6	4	54	54
7	(France) Jean-Baptiste Franceschi		3	WD			15	15
Pos.	Driver	SWE (Sweden)	CRO (Croatia)	POR (Portugal)	EST (Estonia)	GRC (Greece)	Total points	Best 4

Key
Colour	Result
Gold	Winner
Silver	2nd place
Bronze	3rd place
Green	Points finish
Blue	Non-points finish
Blue	Non-classified finish (NC)
Purple	Did not finish (Ret)
Black	Excluded (EX)
Black	Disqualified (DSQ)
White	Did not start (DNS)
White	Cancelled (C)
Blank	Withdrew entry from the event (WD)

=== FIA WRC3 Junior Championship for Co-Drivers ===
Pos.	Driver	SWE (Sweden)	CRO (Croatia)	POR (Portugal)	EST (Estonia)	GRC (Greece)	Total points	Best 4
1	(Republic of Ireland) Brian Hoy	1^{5}	4^{5}	4^{8}	3^{3}	2^{6}	127	115
2	(Finland) Enni Mälkönen	5^{7}	Ret^{8}	1^{6}	1^{4}	5^{6}	111	111
3	(Finland) Mikael Korhonen	2^{3}	1^{1}	2^{1}	4^{1}	6	95	83
4	(Republic of Ireland) Liam Regan	3^{1}	5^{1}	Ret^{1}	5	3	68	68
5	(Sweden) Julia Thulin				2^{17}	1^{4}	64	64
6	(Estonia) Aleks Lesk	6	2^{3}	3^{5}			49	49
7	(Kenya) Mwangi Kioni	4	Ret		6	4	44	44
8	(France) Anthony Gorguilo		3	WD			15	15
9	(United Kingdom) Stuart Loudon			5			10	10
Pos.	Driver	SWE (Sweden)	CRO (Croatia)	POR (Portugal)	EST (Estonia)	GRC (Greece)	Total points	Best 4

Key
Colour	Result
Gold	Winner
Silver	2nd place
Bronze	3rd place
Green	Points finish
Blue	Non-points finish
Blue	Non-classified finish (NC)
Purple	Did not finish (Ret)
Black	Excluded (EX)
Black	Disqualified (DSQ)
White	Did not start (DNS)
White	Cancelled (C)
Blank	Withdrew entry from the event (WD)
