= Enni Mälkönen =

Finnish rally driver

Personal information
- Nationality: (Finland) Finnish
- Full name: Enni Marja Lyydia Mälkönen
- Born: 25 September 1990 (age 36)

World Rally Championship record
- Years active: 2018, 2021–present
- Teams: Toksport WRT, Printsport, Toyota Gazoo Racing WRT
- Rallies: 34
- Championships: 0
- Rally wins: 0
- Podiums: 0
- Stage wins: 1
- Total points: 56
- First rally: 2018 Rally Finland

Enni Marja Lyydia Mälkönen (born 25 September 1990) is a Finnish rally co-driver. She won the World Rally Championship-3 co-drivers' championship in 2022, and the World Rally Championship-2 co-drivers' championship in 2024.

== Career ==
Mälkönen previously competed in show jumping, but decided to take up rallying after her horse was injured. Her father was also a rally driver. Mälkönen made her rally debut in 2012.

Mälkönen won the WRC3 co-drivers' championship in 2022, making her the first woman to win the championship in any WRC class. The two top drivers in the class (Lauri Joona and Jan Černý) changed co-drivers during the season, while Mälkönen continued as Sami Pajari's co-driver throughout the season.

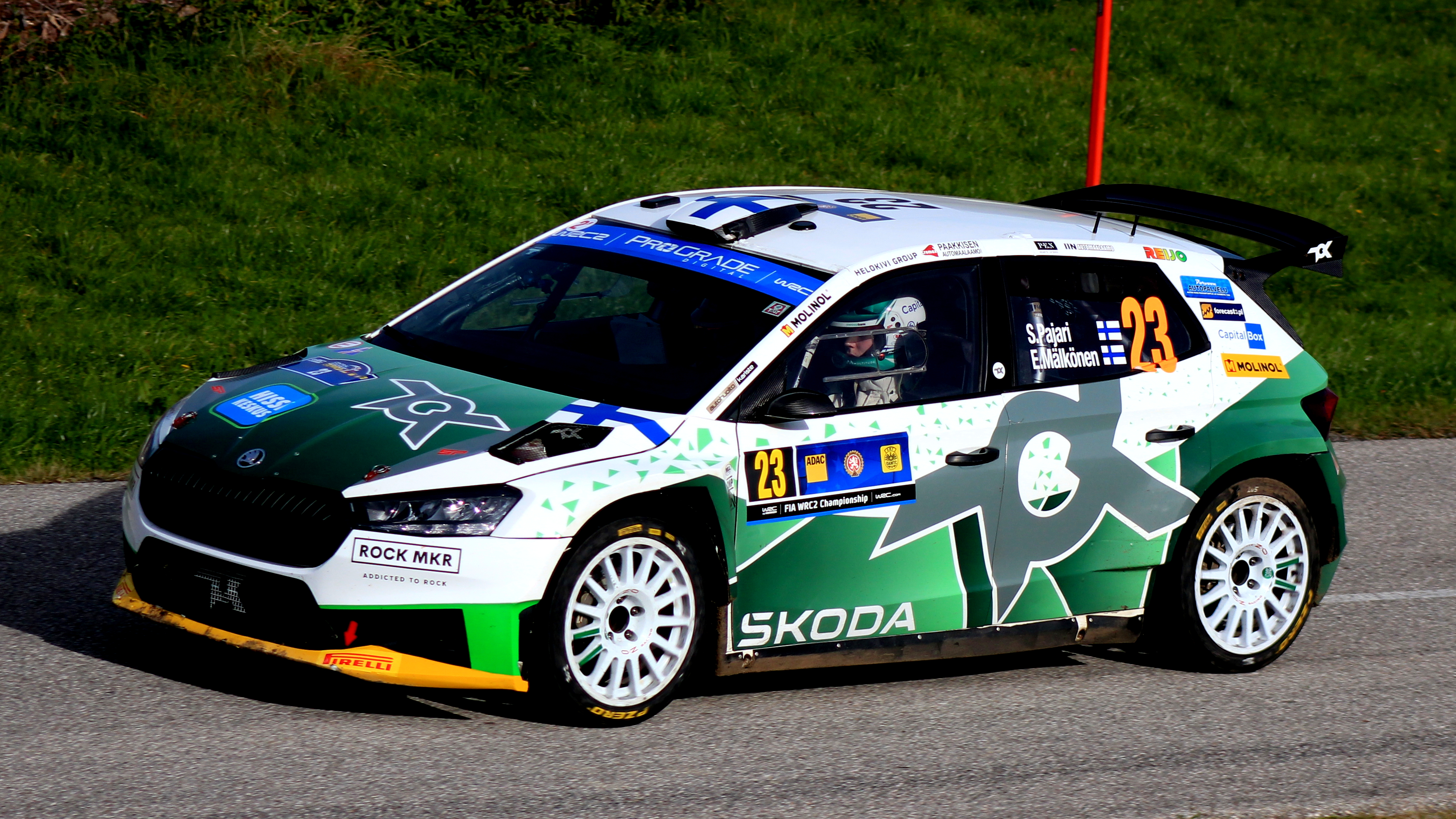
2023 WRC2 Central European Rally

In 2024, Mälkönen and Pajari won the WRC2 championship, where she became the second woman to win the co-drivers' championship in the category, after Reeta Hämäläinen in 2022. Following their win, Pajari announced that the duo would no longer be driving together, as he was moving up to the premier WRC class. Mälkönen was later announced to be co-driving for Esapekka Lappi in the 2025 Finnish Rally Championship.

== Results ==
=== WRC results ===
Year	Entrant	Car	1	2	3	4	5	6	7	8	9	10	11	12	13	Pos.	Points
2018	M-Sport Ford WRT	Ford Fiesta R5	MON	SWE	MEX	FRA	ARG	POR	ITA	FIN; 51	GER	TUR	GBR	ESP	AUS	NC	0
2021	Sami Pajari	Ford Fiesta Rally4	MON	ARC; 28	CRO	POR	ITA	KEN	EST	BEL	GRE	FIN	ESP	MNZ		NC	0
2022	Sami Pajari	Ford Fiesta Rally3	MON; 22	SWE; 31	CRO; Ret	POR; 17		KEN	EST; 16		BEL; 53	GRE; 43	NZL			NC	0
2022	Sami Pajari	Škoda Fabia Rally2 evo					ITA; 12			FIN; 21				ESP; 17	JPN; 11	NC	0
2023	Toksport WRT	Škoda Fabia RS Rally2	MON; WD	SWE; 10	MEX	CRO; 13	POR; 22	ITA; 29	KEN	EST; 10						17th	12
2023	Toksport WRT 2	Škoda Fabia RS Rally2									FIN; 7	GRE; Ret	CHL; 8	EUR; 13	JPN	17th	12
2024	Printsport	Toyota GR Yaris Rally2	MON; 12	SWE; 6	KEN	CRO; 10	POR; Ret	ITA; 6	POL; 9	LAT; 12		GRE; 4			JPN; 8	10th	44
2024	Toyota Gazoo Racing WRT	Toyota GR Yaris Rally1									FIN; 4		CHL; 6	EUR; Ret		10th	44

=== WRC-2 results ===
Year	Entrant	Car	1	2	3	4	5	6	7	8	9	10	11	12	13	Pos.	Points
2022	Sami Pajari	Škoda Fabia Rally2 evo	MON	SWE	CRO	POR	ITA; 5	KEN	EST	FIN; 10	BEL	GRE	NZL	ESP; 7	JPN; 5	14th	30
2023	Toksport WRT	Škoda Fabia RS Rally2	MON	SWE; 3	MEX	CRO; 5	POR	ITA; 19	KEN	EST; 2						7th	86
2023	Toksport WRT 2	Škoda Fabia RS Rally2									FIN; 1	GRE; Ret	CHL; 3	EUR	JPN	7th	86
2024	Printsport	Toyota GR Yaris Rally2	MON	SWE; 2	KEN	CRO	POR	ITA; 1	POL; 1	LAT; 3	FIN	GRE; 1	CHL	EUR	JPN; 2	1st	126

=== WRC-3 Open results ===
Year	Entrant	Car	1	2	3	4	5	6	7	8	9	10	11	12	13	Pos.	Points
2022	Sami Pajari	Ford Fiesta Rally3	MON; 1	SWE; 4	CRO; Ret	POR; 1	ITA	KEN	EST; 1	FIN	BEL	GRE	NZL	ESP	JPN	1st	87

* Season still in progress.
