= 2024 Rally de Portugal =

57th edition of Rally de Portugal

2024 Rally de Portugal Vodafone Rally de Portugal 2024
Round 5 of 13 in the 2024 World Rally Championship
← Previous event	Next event →
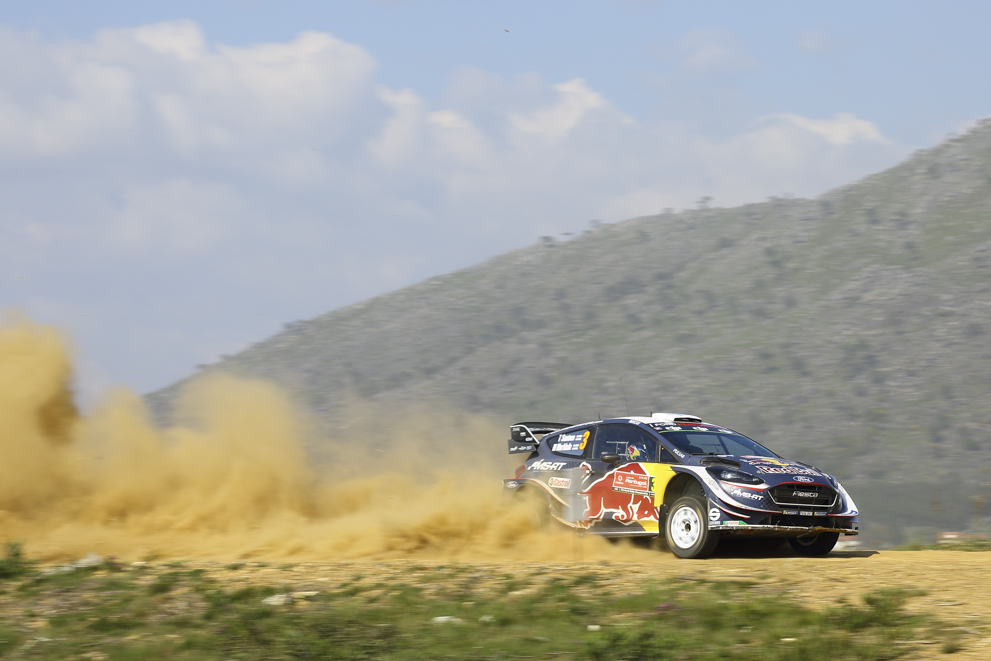
- Rocks and deep ruts are the features of the Rally de Portugal.
- Host country: Portugal
- Rally base: Matosinhos, Porto
- Dates run: 9 – 12 May 2024
- Start location: Figueira da Foz, Central Region
- Finish location: Fafe, Braga
- Stages: 22 (337.04 km; 209.43 miles)
- Stage surface: Gravel
- Transport distance: 1,353.08 km (840.76 miles)
- Overall distance: 1,690.12 km (1,050.19 miles)

Statistics
- Crews registered: 69
- Crews: 67 at start, 34 at finish

Overall results
- Overall winner: (France) Sébastien Ogier (France) Vincent Landais (Japan) Toyota Gazoo Racing WRT; 3:41:32.3
- Saturday Overall leader: (France) Sébastien Ogier (France) Vincent Landais (Japan) Toyota Gazoo Racing WRT; 3:01:55.8
- Sunday Accumulated leader: (Estonia) Ott Tänak (Estonia) Martin Järveoja (South Korea) Hyundai Shell Mobis WRT; 39:32.5
- Power Stage winner: (Belgium) Thierry Neuville (Belgium) Martijn Wydaeghe (South Korea) Hyundai Shell Mobis WRT; 6:23.7

Support category results
- WRC-2 winner: (Spain) Jan Solans (Spain) Rodrigo Sanjuan de Eusebio; 3:53:25.2
- WRC-3 winner: (Paraguay) Diego Dominguez Jr. (Spain) Rogelio Peñate; 4:09:54.7

The 2024 Rally de Portugal (also known as the Vodafone Rally de Portugal 2024) was a motor racing event for rally cars that was held over four days from 9 to 12 May 2024. It marked the fifty-seventh running of the Rally de Portugal, and was the fifth round of the 2024 World Rally Championship, World Rally Championship-2 and World Rally Championship-3. The 2024 event was based in Matosinhos in the Porto District and was contested over twenty-two special stages, covering a total competitive distance of 337.04 km (209.43 mi).

Kalle Rovanperä and Jonne Halttunen were the defending rally winners. Their team, Toyota Gazoo Racing WRT, were the defending manufacturer's winners. Gus Greensmith and Jonas Andersson were the defending rally winners in the WRC-2 category. Roope Korhonen and Anssi Viinikka were the defending rally winners in the WRC-3 category.

Sébastien Ogier and Vincent Landais won the rally, and their team, Toyota, successfully defended their manufacturer's title. Jan Solans and Rodrigo Sanjuan de Eusebio won the World Rally Championship-2 category. Diego Dominguez Jr. and Rogelio Peñate won the World Rally Championship-3 category.

== Background ==
=== Entry list ===
The following crews entered into the rally. The event was opened to crews competing in the World Rally Championship, its support categories, the World Rally Championship-2, World Rally Championship-3 and privateer entries that were not registered to score points in any championship. Nine entered under Rally1 regulations, as were thirty-nine Rally2 crews in the World Rally Championship-2 and nine Rally3 crew in the World Rally Championship-3.

Rally1 entries competing in the World Rally Championship
No.	Driver	Co-Driver	Entrant	Car	Championship eligibility	Tyre
6	(Spain) Dani Sordo	(Spain) Cándido Carrera	(South Korea) Hyundai Shell Mobis WRT	Hyundai i20 N Rally1	Driver, Co-driver, Manufacturer	P
8	(Estonia) Ott Tänak	(Estonia) Martin Järveoja	(South Korea) Hyundai Shell Mobis WRT	Hyundai i20 N Rally1	Driver, Co-driver, Manufacturer	P
11	(Belgium) Thierry Neuville	(Belgium) Martijn Wydaeghe	(South Korea) Hyundai Shell Mobis WRT	Hyundai i20 N Rally1	Driver, Co-driver, Manufacturer	P
13	(Luxembourg) Grégoire Munster	(Belgium) Louis Louka	(United Kingdom) M-Sport Ford WRT	Ford Puma Rally1	Driver, Co-driver, Manufacturer	P
16	(France) Adrien Fourmaux	(France) Alexandre Coria	(United Kingdom) M-Sport Ford WRT	Ford Puma Rally1	Driver, Co-driver, Manufacturer	P
17	(France) Sébastien Ogier	(France) Vincent Landais	(Japan) Toyota Gazoo Racing WRT	Toyota GR Yaris Rally1	Driver, Co-driver, Manufacturer	P
18	(Japan) Takamoto Katsuta	(Republic of Ireland) Aaron Johnston	(Japan) Toyota Gazoo Racing WRT	Toyota GR Yaris Rally1	Driver, Co-driver	P
33	(United Kingdom) Elfyn Evans	(United Kingdom) Scott Martin	(Japan) Toyota Gazoo Racing WRT	Toyota GR Yaris Rally1	Driver, Co-driver, Manufacturer	P
69	(Finland) Kalle Rovanperä	(Finland) Jonne Halttunen	(Japan) Toyota Gazoo Racing WRT	Toyota GR Yaris Rally1	Driver, Co-driver, Manufacturer	P

Rally2 entries competing in the World Rally Championship-2
No.	Driver	Co-Driver	Entrant	Car	Championship eligibility	Tyre
20	(Sweden) Oliver Solberg	(United Kingdom) Elliott Edmondson	(Germany) Toksport WRT	Škoda Fabia RS Rally2	Driver, Co-driver, Team	P
21	(France) Yohan Rossel	(France) Arnaud Dunand	(Belgium) DG Sport Compétition	Citroën C3 Rally2	Driver, Co-driver, Team	P
22	(United Kingdom) Gus Greensmith	(Sweden) Jonas Andersson	(Germany) Toksport WRT	Škoda Fabia RS Rally2	Driver, Co-driver, Team	P
23	(Spain) Pepe López	(Spain) David Vázquez Liste	(Spain) Pepe López	Škoda Fabia RS Rally2	Challenger Driver, Challenger Co-driver	P
24	(Finland) Sami Pajari	(Finland) Enni Mälkönen	(Finland) Printsport	Toyota GR Yaris Rally2	Challenger Driver, Challenger Co-driver	P
25	(Bulgaria) Nikolay Gryazin	Konstantin Aleksandrov (Note: Konstantin Aleksandrov is Russian, but he competes as a neutral competitor using the ANA flag as Russian national emblems were banned by the association due to the Russian invasion of Ukraine.)	(Belgium) DG Sport Compétition	Citroën C3 Rally2	Team	P
26	(Estonia) Georg Linnamäe	(United Kingdom) James Morgan	(Estonia) Georg Linnamäe	Toyota GR Yaris Rally2	Challenger Driver, Challenger Co-driver	P
27	(Finland) Roope Korhonen	(Finland) Anssi Viinikka	(Finland) Roope Korhonen	Toyota GR Yaris Rally2	Challenger Driver, Challenger Co-driver	P
28	(Spain) Jan Solans	(Spain) Rodrigo Sanjuan de Eusebio	(Spain) Jan Solans	Toyota GR Yaris Rally2	Challenger Driver, Challenger Co-driver	P
29	(Finland) Lauri Joona	(Finland) Janni Hussi	(Finland) Lauri Joona	Škoda Fabia RS Rally2	Challenger Driver, Challenger Co-driver	P
30	(Japan) Yuki Yamamoto	(Finland) Marko Salminen	(Japan) Toyota Gazoo Racing WRT NG	Toyota GR Yaris Rally2	Challenger Driver, Challenger Co-driver, Team	P
31	(France) Pierre-Louis Loubet	(France) Loris Pascaud	(Germany) Toksport WRT	Škoda Fabia RS Rally2	Driver, Co-driver, Team	P
32	(Finland) Teemu Suninen	(Finland) Mikko Markkula	(Finland) Teemu Suninen	Hyundai i20 N Rally2	Driver, Co-driver	P
34	(Bolivia) Marco Bulacia	(Spain) Diego Vallejo	(Bolivia) Marco Bulacia	Citroën C3 Rally2	Challenger Driver, Challenger Co-driver	P
35	(United Kingdom) Kris Meeke	(United Kingdom) Stuart Loudon	(United Kingdom) Kris Meeke	Hyundai i20 N Rally2	Driver, Co-driver	P
36	(Paraguay) Fabrizio Zaldivar	(Italy) Marcelo Der Ohannesian	(Paraguay) Fabrizio Zaldivar	Škoda Fabia RS Rally2	Challenger Driver, Challenger Co-driver	P
37	(Japan) Hikaru Kogure	(Finland) Topi Matias Luhtinen	(Japan) Toyota Gazoo Racing WRT NG	Toyota GR Yaris Rally2	Challenger Driver, Challenger Co-driver, Team	P
38	(Republic of Ireland) Josh McErlean	(Republic of Ireland) James Fulton	(Republic of Ireland) Josh McErlean	Škoda Fabia RS Rally2	Challenger Driver, Challenger Co-driver	P
39	(Republic of Ireland) William Creighton	(Republic of Ireland) Liam Regan	(Republic of Ireland) Motorsport Ireland Rally Academy	Ford Fiesta Rally2	Challenger Driver, Challenger Co-driver	P
40	(Czech Republic) Martin Prokop	(Czech Republic) Michal Ernst	(Czech Republic) Martin Prokop	Škoda Fabia RS Rally2	Challenger Driver, Challenger Co-driver	P
41	(Portugal) Armindo Araújo	(Portugal) Luís Ramalho	(Portugal) Armindo Araújo	Škoda Fabia RS Rally2	Challenger Driver, Challenger Co-driver	P
43	(Portugal) Ricardo Teodósio	(Portugal) José Teixeira	(Portugal) Ricardo Teodósio	Hyundai i20 N Rally2	Challenger Driver, Challenger Co-driver	P
44	(Portugal) José Pedro Fontes	(Portugal) Inês Ponte	(Portugal) José Pedro Fontes	Citroën C3 Rally2	Challenger Driver, Challenger Co-driver	P
45	(Italy) Roberto Daprà	(Italy) Luca Guglielmetti	(Italy) Roberto Daprà	Škoda Fabia Rally2 evo	Challenger Driver, Challenger Co-driver	P
46	(Australia) Lewis Bates	(Australia) Anthony McLoughlin	(Australia) Lewis Bates	Toyota GR Yaris Rally2	Challenger Driver, Challenger Co-driver	P
47	(Saudi Arabia) Rakan Al-Rashed	(Portugal) Hugo Magalhães	(Finland) Printsport	Škoda Fabia RS Rally2	Challenger Driver, Challenger Co-driver	P
48	(Portugal) Pedro Almeida	(Portugal) Mário Castro	(Portugal) Pedro Almeida	Škoda Fabia Rally2 evo	Challenger Driver, Challenger Co-driver	P
49	(Spain) Sergi Pérez Jr.	(Spain) Axel Coronado	(Spain) Sergi Pérez Jr.	Škoda Fabia RS Rally2	Challenger Driver, Challenger Co-driver	P
50	(Portugal) Paulo Neto	(Portugal) Nuno Mota Ribeiro	(Portugal) Paulo Neto	Škoda Fabia Rally2 evo	Challenger/Masters Driver, Challenger Co-driver	P
51	(France) Patrick Déjean	(France) Yannick Jammes	(France) Patrick Déjean	Ford Fiesta R5	Challenger/Masters Driver, Challenger Co-driver	P
52	(Portugal) Lucas Simões	(Portugal) Valter Cardoso	(Portugal) Lucas Simões	Ford Fiesta Rally2	Challenger Driver, Challenger Co-driver	P
53	(Mexico) Alejandro Mauro Sánchez	(Spain) Adrián Pérez Fernández	(Mexico) Alejandro Mauro Sánchez	Škoda Fabia RS Rally2	Challenger Driver, Challenger Co-driver	P
54	(Portugal) Diogo Salvi	(Portugal) Carlos Magalhães	(Portugal) Diogo Salvi	Škoda Fabia Rally2 evo	Challenger/Masters Driver, Challenger/Masters Co-driver	P
55	(Mexico) Miguel Granados	(Spain) Marc Martí	(Mexico) Miguel Granados	Škoda Fabia RS Rally2	Challenger/Masters Driver, Challenger/Masters Co-driver	P
56	(United Kingdom) James Leckey	(United Kingdom) Stephen McAuley	(United Kingdom) James Leckey	Citroën C3 Rally2	Challenger Driver, Challenger Co-driver	P
57	(France) Pierre Lafay	(France) Charlyne Quartini	(France) Pierre Lafay	Citroën C3 Rally2	Challenger/Masters Driver, Challenger Co-driver	P
58	(Portugal) Ernesto Cunha	(Portugal) Rui Raimundo	(Portugal) Ernesto Cunha	Škoda Fabia Rally2 evo	Challenger Driver, Challenger Co-driver	P
59	(Mexico) Juan Carlos Peralta	(Mexico) Víctor Pérez Couto	(Mexico) Juan Carlos Peralta	Škoda Fabia RS Rally2	Challenger Driver, Challenger Co-driver	P
60	(Spain) Daniel Alonso Villarón	(Spain) Alejandro López	(Spain) Past Racing	Ford Fiesta Rally2	Challenger/Masters Driver, Challenger Co-driver	P
61	(France) Jean-Michel Raoux	(France) Isabelle Galmiche	(France) Jean-Michel Raoux	Toyota GR Yaris Rally2	Challenger/Masters Driver, Challenger/Masters Co-driver	P

Rally3 entries competing in the World Rally Championship-3
No.	Driver	Co-Driver	Entrant	Car	Tyre
62	(Czech Republic) Jan Černý	(Czech Republic) Ondřej Krajča	(Czech Republic) Jan Černý	Ford Fiesta Rally3	P
63	(Paraguay) Diego Dominguez Jr.	(Spain) Rogelio Peñate	(Paraguay) Diego Dominguez Jr.	Ford Fiesta Rally3	P
64	(France) Mattéo Chatillon	(France) Maxence Cornuau	(France) Mattéo Chatillon	Renault Clio Rally3	P
65	(Bolivia) Bruno Bulacia	(Brazil) Gabriel Morales	(Bolivia) Bruno Bulacia	Ford Fiesta Rally3	P
66	(France) Ghjuvanni Rossi	(France) Kylian Sarmezan	(France) Ghjuvanni Rossi	Renault Clio Rally3	P
67	(France) Tristan Charpentier	(France) Florian Barral	(France) Tristan Charpentier	Ford Fiesta Rally3	P
68	(France) Tom Pieri	(France) Alexis Maillefert	(France) Tom Pieri	Renault Clio Rally3	P
70	(Portugal) Nuno Caetano	(Portugal) Sofia Mouta	(Portugal) Nuno Caetano	Ford Fiesta Rally3	P
71	(Croatia) Slaven Šekuljica	(Croatia) Damir Petrović	(Croatia) Slaven Šekuljica	Ford Fiesta Rally3	P

=== Itinerary ===
All dates and times are in WEST (UTC+1).

Date	No.	Time span	Stage name	Distance
9 May	—	After 8:01	Baltar [Shakedown]	4.61 km
9 May		After 17:00	Opening ceremony, Coimbra	—N/a
9 May	SS1	After 19:05	SSS Figueira da Foz	2.94 km
10 May	SS2	After 8:05	Mortágua 1	18.15 km
10 May	SS3	After 9:35	Lousã 1	12.28 km
10 May	SS4	After 10:35	Góis 1	14.30 km
10 May	SS5	After 11:35	Arganil 1	18.72 km
10 May		12:15 – 12:45	Regroup, Arganil	—N/a
10 May		12:45 – 13:00	Tyre fitting zone, Arganil	—N/a
10 May	SS6	After 14:05	Lousã 2	12.28 km
10 May	SS7	After 15:05	Góis 2	14.30 km
10 May	SS8	After 16:05	Arganil 2	18.72 km
10 May	SS9	After 17:35	Mortágua 2	18.15 km
10 May		20:15 – 21:04	Flexi service A, Exponor	—N/a
11 May	SS10	After 8:05	Felgueiras 1	8.81 km
11 May	SS11	After 9:05	Montim 1	8.69 km
11 May	SS12	After 10:05	Amarante 1	37.24 km
11 May	SS13	After 11:35	Paredes 1	16.09 km
11 May		12:26 – 12:46	Regroup, Exponor	—N/a
11 May		12:46 – 13:30	Service B, Exponor	—N/a
11 May	SS14	After 14:35	Felgueiras 2	8.81 km
11 May	SS15	After 15:35	Montim 2	8.69 km
11 May	SS16	After 16:35	Amarante 2	37.24 km
11 May	SS17	After 18:05	Paredes 2	16.09 km
11 May	SS18	After 19:05	SSS Lousada	3.36 km
11 May		20:15 – 21:04	Flexi service C, Exponor	—N/a
12 May	SS19	After 7:05	Cabeceiras de Basto 1	19.91 km
12 May	SS20	After 8:35	Fafe 1	11.18 km
12 May	SS21	After 9:35	Cabeceiras de Basto 2	19.91 km
12 May		10:35 – 11:20	Regroup, Vieira do Minho	—N/a
12 May	SS22	After 12:15	Fafe 2 [Power Stage]	11.18 km
12 May		13:53 – 14:07	Service D, Exponor	—N/a
12 May		After 14:25	Finish, Matosinhos	—N/a
12 May		After 15:45	Podium ceremony, Matosinhos	—N/a

== Report ==
=== WRC Rally1 ===
==== Classification ====
Position		No.	Driver	Co-driver	Entrant	Car	Time	Difference	Points			
Class	Event	No.	Driver	Co-driver	Entrant	Car	Time	Difference	SAT	SUN	WPS	Total
1	1	17	Sébastien Ogier	Vincent Landais	Toyota Gazoo Racing WRT	Toyota GR Yaris Rally1	3:41:32.3	0.0	18	5	2	25
2	2	8	Ott Tänak	Martin Järveoja	Hyundai Shell Mobis WRT	Hyundai i20 N Rally1	3:41:40.2	+7.9	15	7	4	26
3	3	11	Thierry Neuville	Martijn Wydaeghe	Hyundai Shell Mobis WRT	Hyundai i20 N Rally1	3:42:42.1	+1:09.8	13	6	5	24
4	4	16	Adrien Fourmaux	Alexandre Coria	M-Sport Ford WRT	Ford Puma Rally1	3:43:20.1	+1:47.8	8	4	0	12
5	5	6	Dani Sordo	Cándido Carrera	Hyundai Shell Mobis WRT	Hyundai i20 N Rally1	3:44:21.2	+2:48.9	10	1	0	11
6	6	33	Elfyn Evans	Scott Martin	Toyota Gazoo Racing WRT	Toyota GR Yaris Rally1	3:48:08.3	+6:36.0	6	0	0	6
7	29	18	Takamoto Katsuta	Aaron Johnston	Toyota Gazoo Racing WRT	Toyota GR Yaris Rally1	4:52:06.1	+1:10:33.8	0	3	1	4
8	31	69	Kalle Rovanperä	Jonne Halttunen	Toyota Gazoo Racing WRT	Toyota GR Yaris Rally1	5:02:26.7	+1:20:54.4	0	2	3	5
Retired SS21		13	Grégoire Munster	Louis Louka	M-Sport Ford WRT	Ford Puma Rally1	Off road		0	0	0	0

==== Special stages ====
Stage	Winners	Car	Time	Class leaders
SD	Sordo / Carrera	Hyundai i20 N Rally1	2:51.2	—N/a
SS1	Neuville / Wydaeghe	Hyundai i20 N Rally1	2:24.2	Neuville / Wydaeghe
SS2	Katsuta / Johnston	Toyota GR Yaris Rally1	11:30.4	Neuville / Wydaeghe
SS3	Sordo / Carrera	Hyundai i20 N Rally1	8:59.4	Katsuta / Johnston
SS4	Sordo / Carrera	Hyundai i20 N Rally1	9:07.2	Katsuta / Johnston
SS5	Neuville / Wydaeghe	Hyundai i20 N Rally1	11:40.5	Katsuta / Johnston
SS6	Ogier / Landais	Toyota GR Yaris Rally1	8:53.3	Rovanperä / Halttunen
SS7	Sordo / Carrera	Hyundai i20 N Rally1	9:03.1	Rovanperä / Halttunen
SS8	Rovanperä / Halttunen	Toyota GR Yaris Rally1	11:36.0	Rovanperä / Halttunen
SS9	Ogier / Landais	Toyota GR Yaris Rally1	11:24.2	Rovanperä / Halttunen
SS10	Rovanperä / Halttunen	Toyota GR Yaris Rally1	5:44.3	Rovanperä / Halttunen
SS11	Ogier / Landais	Toyota GR Yaris Rally1	5:32.7	Ogier / Landais
SS12	Tänak / Järveoja	Hyundai i20 N Rally1	24:06.4	Tänak / Järveoja
SS13	Ogier / Landais	Toyota GR Yaris Rally1	11:43.0	Ogier / Landais
SS14	Tänak / Järveoja	Hyundai i20 N Rally1	5:45.9	Ogier / Landais
SS15	Tänak / Järveoja	Hyundai i20 N Rally1	5:28.7	Ogier / Landais
SS16	Ogier / Landais	Toyota GR Yaris Rally1	24:09.6	Ogier / Landais
SS17	Ogier / Landais	Toyota GR Yaris Rally1	11:36.0	Ogier / Landais
SS18	Fourmaux / Coria	Ford Puma Rally1	2:30.8	Ogier / Landais
SS19	Ogier / Landais	Toyota GR Yaris Rally1	13:18.5	Ogier / Landais
SS20	Tänak / Järveoja	Hyundai i20 N Rally1	6:35.3	Ogier / Landais
SS21	Tänak / Järveoja	Hyundai i20 N Rally1	13:08.7	Ogier / Landais
SS22	Neuville / Wydaeghe	Hyundai i20 N Rally1	6:23.7	Ogier / Landais

==== Championship standings ====
Pos.	Drivers' championships			Co-drivers' championships			Manufacturers' championships		
Pos.	Move	Driver	Points	Move	Co-driver	Points	Move	Manufacturer	Points
1		Thierry Neuville	110		Martijn Wydaeghe	110	1	Hyundai Shell Mobis WRT	219
2		Elfyn Evans	86		Scott Martin	86	1	Toyota Gazoo Racing WRT	215
3	1	Ott Tänak	79	1	Martin Järveoja	79		M-Sport Ford WRT	110
4	1	Adrien Fourmaux	71	1	Alexandre Coria	71			
5		Sébastien Ogier	70		Vincent Landais	70			

=== WRC-2 Rally2 ===
==== Classification ====
Position		No.	Driver	Co-driver	Entrant	Car	Time	Difference	Points	
Event	Class	No.	Driver	Co-driver	Entrant	Car	Time	Difference	Class	Event
8	1	28	Jan Solans	Rodrigo Sanjuan de Eusebio	Jan Solans	Toyota GR Yaris Rally2	3:53:25.2	0.0	25	0
9	2	38	Josh McErlean	James Fulton	Josh McErlean	Škoda Fabia RS Rally2	3:53:28.4	+3.2	18	2
10	3	29	Lauri Joona	Janni Hussi	Lauri Joona	Škoda Fabia RS Rally2	3:55:12.6	+1:47.4	15	1
11	4	36	Fabrizio Zaldivar	Marcelo Der Ohannesian	Fabrizio Zaldivar	Škoda Fabia RS Rally2	3:55:39.6	+2:14.4	12	0
12	5	21	Yohan Rossel	Arnaud Dunand	DG Sport Compétition	Citroën C3 Rally2	3:55:55.8	+2:30.6	10	0
13	6	27	Roope Korhonen	Anssi Viinikka	Roope Korhonen	Toyota GR Yaris Rally2	3:56:38.5	+3:13.3	8	0
14	7	40	Martin Prokop	Michal Ernst	Martin Prokop	Škoda Fabia RS Rally2	3:58:18.4	+4:53.2	6	0
15	8	26	Georg Linnamäe	James Morgan	Georg Linnamäe	Toyota GR Yaris Rally2	4:00:02.9	+6:37.7	4	0
16	9	45	Roberto Daprà	Luca Guglielmetti	Roberto Daprà	Škoda Fabia Rally2 evo	4:01:31.6	+8:06.4	2	0
17	10	41	Armindo Araújo	Luís Ramalho	Armindo Araújo	Škoda Fabia RS Rally2	4:04:45.4	+11:20.2	1	0
21	11	61	Jean-Michel Raoux	Isabelle Galmiche	Jean-Michel Raoux	Toyota GR Yaris Rally2	4:16:10.6	+22:45.4	0	0
23	12	39	William Creighton	Liam Regan	Motorsport Ireland Rally Academy	Ford Fiesta Rally2	4:16:43.4	+23:18.2	0	0
25	13	43	Ricardo Teodósio	José Teixeira	Ricardo Teodósio	Hyundai i20 N Rally2	4:18:48.1	+25:22.9	0	0
30	14	46	Lewis Bates	Anthony McLoughlin	Lewis Bates	Toyota GR Yaris Rally2	4:53:15.0	+59:49.8	0	0
32	15	59	Juan Carlos Peralta	Víctor Pérez Couto	Juan Carlos Peralta	Škoda Fabia RS Rally2	5:07:59.8	+1:14:34.6	0	0
34	16	56	James Leckey	Stephen McAuley	James Leckey	Citroën C3 Rally2	5:40:10.6	+1:46:45.4	0	0
Retired SS22		51	Patrick Déjean	Yannick Jammes	Patrick Déjean	Ford Fiesta R5	Rolled		0	0
Retired SS22		53	Alejandro Mauro Sánchez	Adrián Pérez Fernández	Alejandro Mauro Sánchez	Škoda Fabia RS Rally2	Rolled		0	0
Retired SS21		24	Sami Pajari	Enni Mälkönen	Printsport	Toyota GR Yaris Rally2	Accident		0	0
Retired SS19		50	Paulo Neto	Nuno Mota Ribeiro	Paulo Neto	Škoda Fabia Rally2 evo	Medical reasons		0	0
Retired SS18		54	Diogo Salvi	Carlos Magalhães	Diogo Salvi	Škoda Fabia Rally2 evo	Personal reasons		0	0
Retired SS18		60	Daniel Alonso Villarón	Alejandro López	Past Racing	Ford Fiesta Rally2	Medical reasons		0	0
Retired SS17		35	Kris Meeke	Stuart Loudon	Kris Meeke	Hyundai i20 N Rally2	Accident		0	0
Retired SS15		57	Pierre Lafay	Charlyne Quartini	Pierre Lafay	Citroën C3 Rally2	Accident		0	0
Retired SS14		22	Gus Greensmith	Jonas Andersson	Toksport WRT	Škoda Fabia RS Rally2	Accident		0	0
Retired SS13		55	Miguel Granados	Marc Martí	Miguel Granados	Škoda Fabia RS Rally2	Mechanical		0	0
Retired SS13		58	Ernesto Cunha	Rui Raimundo	Ernesto Cunha	Škoda Fabia Rally2 evo	Accident		0	0
Retired SS11		20	Oliver Solberg	Elliott Edmondson	Toksport WRT	Škoda Fabia RS Rally2	Rolled		0	0
Retired SS8		34	Marco Bulacia	Diego Vallejo	Marco Bulacia	Citroën C3 Rally2	Withdrawn		0	0
Retired SS7		31	Pierre-Louis Loubet	Loris Pascaud	Toksport WRT	Škoda Fabia RS Rally2	Accident		0	0
Retired SS6		37	Hikaru Kogure	Topi Matias Luhtinen	Toyota Gazoo Racing WRT NG	Toyota GR Yaris Rally2	Engine		0	0
Retired SS5		32	Teemu Suninen	Mikko Markkula	Teemu Suninen	Hyundai i20 N Rally2	Rolled		0	0
Retired SS5		52	Lucas Simões	Valter Cardoso	Lucas Simões	Ford Fiesta Rally2	Rolled		0	0
Retired SS2		23	Pepe López	David Vázquez Liste	Pepe López	Škoda Fabia RS Rally2	Rolled		0	0
Retired SS2		30	Yuki Yamamoto	Marko Salminen	Toyota Gazoo Racing WRT NG	Toyota GR Yaris Rally2	Accident		0	0

==== Special stages ====
Overall
Stage	Winners	Car	Time	Class leaders
SD	Greensmith / Andersson	Škoda Fabia RS Rally2	2:57.7	—N/a
SS1	Rossel / Dunand	Citroën C3 Rally2	2:28.9	Rossel / Dunand
SS2	Solberg / Edmondson	Škoda Fabia RS Rally2	11:56.2	Solberg / Edmondson
SS3	Loubet / Pascaud	Škoda Fabia RS Rally2	9:18.8	Solberg / Edmondson
SS4	Greensmith / Andersson	Škoda Fabia RS Rally2	9:29.8	Greensmith / Andersson
SS5	Solberg / Edmondson	Škoda Fabia RS Rally2	12:10.9	Solberg / Edmondson
SS6	Loubet / Pascaud	Škoda Fabia RS Rally2	9:15.1	Solberg / Edmondson
SS7	Greensmith / Andersson	Škoda Fabia RS Rally2	9:30.2	Greensmith / Andersson
SS8	Solberg / Edmondson	Škoda Fabia RS Rally2	12:16.8	Solberg / Edmondson
SS9	Solberg / Edmondson	Škoda Fabia RS Rally2	11:55.5	Solberg / Edmondson
SS10	Pajari / Mälkönen	Toyota GR Yaris Rally2	6:01.8	Solberg / Edmondson
SS11	Meeke / Loudon	Hyundai i20 N Rally2	5:49.4	Rossel / Dunand
SS12	Rossel / Dunand	Citroën C3 Rally2	25:13.5	Rossel / Dunand
SS13	McErlean / Fulton	Škoda Fabia RS Rally2	12:15.9	Greensmith / Andersson
SS14	Pajari / Mälkönen	Toyota GR Yaris Rally2	6:00.1	McErlean / Fulton
SS15	Pajari / Mälkönen	Toyota GR Yaris Rally2	5:44.4	McErlean / Fulton
SS16	Pajari / Mälkönen	Toyota GR Yaris Rally2	25:19.5	McErlean / Fulton
SS17	Rossel / Dunand	Citroën C3 Rally2	11:57.1	Solans / Sanjuan de Eusebio
SS18	Rossel / Dunand	Citroën C3 Rally2	2:37.4	Solans / Sanjuan de Eusebio
SS19	Pajari / Mälkönen	Toyota GR Yaris Rally2	14:02.5	Solans / Sanjuan de Eusebio
SS20	Pajari / Mälkönen	Toyota GR Yaris Rally2	6:55.5	McErlean / Fulton
SS21	Solans / Sanjuan de Eusebio	Toyota GR Yaris Rally2	13:52.0	Solans / Sanjuan de Eusebio
SS22	Linnamäe / Morgan	Toyota GR Yaris Rally2	6:47.7	Solans / Sanjuan de Eusebio

Challenger
Stage	Winners	Car	Time	Class leaders
SD	Pajari / Mälkönen	Toyota GR Yaris Rally2	3:00.1	—N/a
SS1	Araújo / Ramalho	Škoda Fabia RS Rally2	2:30.7	Araújo / Ramalho
SS2	Pajari / Mälkönen	Toyota GR Yaris Rally2	12:05.7	Solans / Sanjuan de Eusebio
SS3	McErlean / Fulton	Škoda Fabia RS Rally2	9:18.9	McErlean / Fulton
SS4	Linnamäe / Morgan	Toyota GR Yaris Rally2	9:36.3	McErlean / Fulton
SS5	Pajari / Mälkönen	Toyota GR Yaris Rally2	12:24.4	McErlean / Fulton
SS6	Pajari / Mälkönen	Toyota GR Yaris Rally2	9:17.1	McErlean / Fulton
SS7	Pajari / Mälkönen	Toyota GR Yaris Rally2	9:32.1	Solans / Sanjuan de Eusebio
SS8	Linnamäe / Morgan	Toyota GR Yaris Rally2	12:23.7	Solans / Sanjuan de Eusebio
SS9	Pajari / Mälkönen	Toyota GR Yaris Rally2	12:00.7	Solans / Sanjuan de Eusebio
SS10	Pajari / Mälkönen	Toyota GR Yaris Rally2	6:01.8	McErlean / Fulton
SS11	Pajari / Mälkönen	Toyota GR Yaris Rally2	5:49.6	McErlean / Fulton
SS12	Pajari / Mälkönen	Toyota GR Yaris Rally2	25:21.5	McErlean / Fulton
SS13	McErlean / Fulton	Škoda Fabia RS Rally2	12:15.9	McErlean / Fulton
SS14	Pajari / Mälkönen	Toyota GR Yaris Rally2	6:00.1	McErlean / Fulton
SS15	Pajari / Mälkönen	Toyota GR Yaris Rally2	5:44.4	McErlean / Fulton
SS16	Pajari / Mälkönen	Toyota GR Yaris Rally2	25:19.5	McErlean / Fulton
SS17	Solans / Sanjuan de Eusebio	Toyota GR Yaris Rally2	12:04.1	Solans / Sanjuan de Eusebio
SS18	Pajari / Mälkönen	Toyota GR Yaris Rally2	2:38.0	Solans / Sanjuan de Eusebio
SS19	Pajari / Mälkönen	Toyota GR Yaris Rally2	14:02.5	Solans / Sanjuan de Eusebio
SS20	Pajari / Mälkönen	Toyota GR Yaris Rally2	6:55.5	McErlean / Fulton
SS21	Solans / Sanjuan de Eusebio	Toyota GR Yaris Rally2	13:52.0	Solans / Sanjuan de Eusebio
SS22	Linnamäe / Morgan	Toyota GR Yaris Rally2	6:47.7	Solans / Sanjuan de Eusebio

==== Championship standings ====
Pos.	Open Drivers' championships			Open Co-drivers' championships			Teams' championships			Challenger Drivers' championships			Challenger Co-drivers' championships		
Pos.	Move	Driver	Points	Move	Co-driver	Points	Move	Manufacturer	Points	Move	Manufacturer	Points	Move	Driver	Points
1		Yohan Rossel	53		Arnaud Dunand	53		DG Sport Compétition	129		Nicolas Ciamin	48		Yannick Roche	48
2		Oliver Solberg	43		Elliott Edmondson	43		Toksport WRT	70		Pepe López	43		David Vázquez Liste	43
3		Nikolay Gryazin	40		Konstantin Aleksandrov	40		Toyota Gazoo Racing WRT NG	61		Nikolay Gryazin	43		Konstantin Aleksandrov	43
4		Nicolas Ciamin	36		Yannick Roche	36				6	Jan Solans	38	6	Rodrigo Sanjuan de Eusebio	38
5	12	Jan Solans	33	12	Rodrigo Sanjuan de Eusebio	33				1	Lauri Joona	35	1	Janni Hussi	35

=== WRC-3 Rally3 ===
==== Classification ====
Position		No.	Driver	Co-driver	Entrant	Car	Time	Difference	Points
Event	Class	No.	Driver	Co-driver	Entrant	Car	Time	Difference	Points
18	1	63	Diego Dominguez Jr.	Rogelio Peñate	Diego Dominguez Jr.	Ford Fiesta Rally3	4:09:54.7	0.0	25
19	2	64	Mattéo Chatillon	Maxence Cornuau	Mattéo Chatillon	Renault Clio Rally3	4:10:43.6	+48.9	18
20	3	65	Bruno Bulacia	Gabriel Morales	Bruno Bulacia	Ford Fiesta Rally3	4:12:41.4	+2:46.7	15
22	4	62	Jan Černý	Ondřej Krajča	Jan Černý	Ford Fiesta Rally3	4:16:32.8	+6:38.1	12
24	5	66	Ghjuvanni Rossi	Kylian Sarmezan	Ghjuvanni Rossi	Renault Clio Rally3	4:18:39.3	+8:44.6	10
27	6	67	Tristan Charpentier	Florian Barral	Tristan Charpentier	Ford Fiesta Rally3	4:33:41.3	+23:46.6	8
Retired SS13		71	Slaven Šekuljica	Damir Petrović	Slaven Šekuljica	Ford Fiesta Rally3	Gearbox		0
Retired SS7		68	Tom Pieri	Alexis Maillefert	Tom Pieri	Renault Clio Rally3	Rolled		0

==== Special stages ====
Stage	Winners	Car	Time	Class leaders
SD	B. Bulacia / Morales	Ford Fiesta Rally3	3:09.8	—N/a
SS1	Chatillon / Cornuau	Renault Clio Rally3	2:40.0	Chatillon / Cornuau
SS2	Stage neutralized			
SS3	Pieri / Maillefert	Renault Clio Rally3	10:03.5	Chatillon / Cornuau
SS4	Chatillon / Cornuau	Renault Clio Rally3	10:17.5	Chatillon / Cornuau
SS5	Pieri / Maillefert	Renault Clio Rally3	13:20.4	Pieri / Maillefert
SS6	Chatillon / Cornuau	Renault Clio Rally3	10:00.3	Pieri / Maillefert
SS7	Dominguez Jr. / Peñate	Ford Fiesta Rally3	10:16.1	Bulacia / Morales
SS8	Bulacia / Morales	Ford Fiesta Rally3	13:18.8	Bulacia / Morales
SS9	Dominguez Jr. / Peñate	Ford Fiesta Rally3	12:56.2	Dominguez Jr. / Peñate
SS10	Bulacia / Morales	Ford Fiesta Rally3	6:32.7	Dominguez Jr. / Peñate
SS11	Bulacia / Morales	Ford Fiesta Rally3	6:12.1	Dominguez Jr. / Peñate
SS12	Dominguez Jr. / Peñate	Ford Fiesta Rally3	26:57.9	Dominguez Jr. / Peñate
SS13	Bulacia / Morales	Ford Fiesta Rally3	12:46.0	Bulacia / Morales
SS14	Dominguez Jr. / Peñate	Ford Fiesta Rally3	6:30.4	Dominguez Jr. / Peñate
SS15	Dominguez Jr. / Peñate	Ford Fiesta Rally3	6:07.6	Dominguez Jr. / Peñate
SS16	Dominguez Jr. / Peñate	Ford Fiesta Rally3	26:45.5	Dominguez Jr. / Peñate
SS17	Bulacia / Morales	Ford Fiesta Rally3	12:36.0	Dominguez Jr. / Peñate
SS18	Chatillon / Cornuau	Renault Clio Rally3	2:47.8	Dominguez Jr. / Peñate
SS19	Chatillon / Cornuau	Renault Clio Rally3	14:57.7	Dominguez Jr. / Peñate
SS20	Chatillon / Cornuau	Renault Clio Rally3	7:27.4	Dominguez Jr. / Peñate
SS21	Chatillon / Cornuau	Renault Clio Rally3	14:45.4	Dominguez Jr. / Peñate
SS22	Chatillon / Cornuau	Renault Clio Rally3	7:19.4	Dominguez Jr. / Peñate

==== Championship standings ====
Pos.	Drivers' championships			Co-drivers' championships		
Pos.	Move	Driver	Points	Move	Co-driver	Points
1		Romet Jürgenson	43		Siim Oja	43
2		Jan Černý	37		Ondřej Krajča	37
3	3	Mattéo Chatillon	36	3	Maxence Cornuau	36
4	1	Ghjuvanni Rossi	28	1	Kylian Sarmezan	28
5	14	Diego Dominguez Jr.	25	14	Rogelio Peñate	25

== Notes ==
Previous rally: 2024 Croatia Rally	2024 FIA World Rally Championship	Next rally: 2024 Rally Italia Sardegna
Previous rally: 2023 Rally de Portugal	2024 Rally de Portugal	Next rally: 2025 Rally de Portugal
