= 2022 Safari Rally =

70th edition of Safari Rally

2022 Safari Rally Safari Rally Kenya 2022
Round 6 of 13 in the 2022 World Rally Championship
← Previous event	Next event →
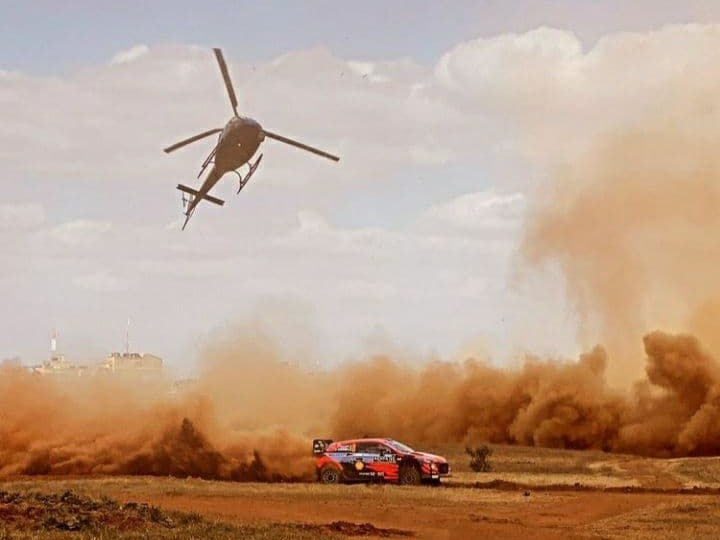
- The rally had rocky and rutted tracks and unpredictable weather.
- Host country: Kenya
- Rally base: Nairobi
- Dates run: 23 – 26 June 2022
- Start location: Kasarani, Nairobi
- Finish location: Hell's Gate National Park, Naivasha
- Stages: 19 (363.44 km; 225.83 miles)
- Stage surface: Gravel
- Transport distance: 860.33 km (534.58 miles)
- Overall distance: 1,223.77 km (760.42 miles)

Statistics
- Crews registered: 42
- Crews: 40 at start, 25 at finish

Overall results
- Overall winner: (Finland) Kalle Rovanperä (Finland) Jonne Halttunen (Japan) Toyota Gazoo Racing WRT; 3:40:24.9
- Power Stage winner: (Belgium) Thierry Neuville (Belgium) Martijn Wydaeghe (South Korea) Hyundai Shell Mobis WRT; 6:00.4

Support category results
- WRC-2 winner: (Poland) Kajetan Kajetanowicz (Poland) Maciej Szczepaniak; 4:16:02.5
- WRC-3 winner: (Kenya) Maxine Wahome (Kenya) Murage Waigwa; 5:20:21.6

The 2022 Safari Rally (also known as the Safari Rally Kenya 2022) was a motor racing event for rally cars held over four days between 23 and 26 June 2022. It would mark the sixty-ninth running of the Safari Rally. The event was the sixth round of the 2022 World Rally Championship, World Rally Championship-2 and World Rally Championship-3. The 2022 event was based in Nairobi and was contested over nineteen special stages covering a total competitive distance of 363.44 km (225.83 mi).

Sébastien Ogier and Julien Ingrassia are the defending rally winners. However, Ingrassia would not defend his title as he retired from the sport at the end of 2021 season. Onkar Rai and Drew Sturrock are the defending rally winners in the WRC-3 category.

Kalle Rovanperä and Jonne Halttunen won the event. Their team, Toyota Gazoo Racing WRT, successfully defended their title. Kajetan Kajetanowicz and Maciej Szczepaniak won the World Rally Championship-2 category. Maxine Wahome and Murage Waigwa won the World Rally Championship-3 category as well as the junior class.

== Background ==
=== Entry list ===
The following crews entered into the rally. The event was opened to crews competing in the World Rally Championship, its support categories, the World Rally Championship-2 and World Rally Championship-3, and privateer entries that are not registered to score points in any championship. Twelve were entered under Rally1 regulations, as are ten Rally2 crews in the World Rally Championship-2 and five Rally3 crews in the World Rally Championship-3.

Rally1 entries competing in the World Rally Championship
No.	Driver	Co-Driver	Entrant	Car	Championship eligibility	Tyre
1	(France) Sébastien Ogier	(France) Benjamin Veillas	(Japan) Toyota Gazoo Racing WRT	Toyota GR Yaris Rally1	Driver, Co-driver, Manufacturer	P
2	(Sweden) Oliver Solberg	(United Kingdom) Elliott Edmondson	(South Korea) Hyundai Shell Mobis WRT	Hyundai i20 N Rally1	Driver, Co-driver, Manufacturer	P
8	(Estonia) Ott Tänak	(Estonia) Martin Järveoja	(South Korea) Hyundai Shell Mobis WRT	Hyundai i20 N Rally1	Driver, Co-driver, Manufacturer	P
9	(Greece) Jourdan Serderidis	(Belgium) Frédéric Miclotte	(United Kingdom) M-Sport Ford WRT	Ford Puma Rally1	Driver, Co-driver	P
11	(Belgium) Thierry Neuville	(Belgium) Martijn Wydaeghe	(South Korea) Hyundai Shell Mobis WRT	Hyundai i20 N Rally1	Driver, Co-driver, Manufacturer	P
16	(France) Adrien Fourmaux	(France) Alexandre Coria	(United Kingdom) M-Sport Ford WRT	Ford Puma Rally1	Driver, Co-driver, Manufacturer	P
18	(Japan) Takamoto Katsuta	(Republic of Ireland) Aaron Johnston	(Japan) Toyota Gazoo Racing WRT NG	Toyota GR Yaris Rally1	Driver, Co-driver, Manufacturer/Team	P
19	(France) Sébastien Loeb	(France) Isabelle Galmiche	(United Kingdom) M-Sport Ford WRT	Ford Puma Rally1	Driver, Co-driver, Manufacturer	P
33	(United Kingdom) Elfyn Evans	(United Kingdom) Scott Martin	(Japan) Toyota Gazoo Racing WRT	Toyota GR Yaris Rally1	Driver, Co-driver, Manufacturer	P
42	(Republic of Ireland) Craig Breen	(Republic of Ireland) Paul Nagle	(United Kingdom) M-Sport Ford WRT	Ford Puma Rally1	Driver, Co-driver, Manufacturer	P
44	(United Kingdom) Gus Greensmith	(Sweden) Jonas Andersson	(United Kingdom) M-Sport Ford WRT	Ford Puma Rally1	Driver, Co-driver	P
69	(Finland) Kalle Rovanperä	(Finland) Jonne Halttunen	(Japan) Toyota Gazoo Racing WRT	Toyota GR Yaris Rally1	Driver, Co-driver, Manufacturer	P

Rally2 entries competing in the World Rally Championship-2
No.	Driver	Co-Driver	Entrant	Car	Championship eligibility	Tyre
20	(Poland) Kajetan Kajetanowicz	(Poland) Maciej Szczepaniak	(Poland) Kajetan Kajetanowicz	Škoda Fabia Rally2 evo	Driver, Co-driver	P
21	(Czech Republic) Martin Prokop	(Czech Republic) Michal Ernst	(Czech Republic) Martin Prokop	Ford Fiesta Rally2	Driver, Co-driver	P
22	(United States) Sean Johnston	(United States) Alexander Kihurani	(France) Saintéloc Junior Team	Citroën C3 Rally2	Driver, Co-driver	P
23	(Kenya) Raajpal Bharij	(Kenya) Jasneil Ghataure	(Kenya) Raajpal Bharij	Škoda Fabia R5	Driver, Co-driver	—N/a
24	(India) Gaurav Gill	(Brazil) Gabriel Morales	(India) Gaurav Gill	Škoda Fabia R5	Driver, Co-driver	P
25	(Kenya) Karan Patel	(Kenya) Tauseef Khan	(Kenya) Karan Patel	Ford Fiesta R5	Driver, Co-driver	P
26	(Zambia) Leroy Gomes	(Zambia) Urshlla Gomes	(Zambia) Leroy Gomes	Ford Fiesta R5	Driver, Co-driver	P
27	(Kenya) Amanraaj Rai	(United Kingdom) Gurdeep Panesar	(Kenya) Amanraaj Rai	Škoda Fabia Rally2 evo	Junior Driver, Co-driver	P
28	(Kenya) Aakif Virani	(Kenya) Azhar Bhatti	(Kenya) Aakif Virani	Škoda Fabia Rally2 evo	Driver, Co-driver	P
29	(Kenya) Piero Canobbio	(Italy) Fabrizia Pons	(Kenya) Piero Canobbio	Hyundai i20 R5	Driver, Co-driver	—N/a

Rally3 entries competing in the World Rally Championship-3
No.	Driver	Co-Driver	Entrant	Car	Championship eligibility	Tyre
30	(Kenya) Jeremy Wahome	(Kenya) Victor Okundi	(Kenya) Jeremy Wahome	Ford Fiesta Rally3	Open	P
31	(Kenya) Hamza Anwar	(Kenya) Adnan Din	(Kenya) Hamza Anwar	Ford Fiesta Rally3	Open	P
32	(Kenya) McRae Kimathi	(Kenya) Mwangi Kioni	(Kenya) McRae Kimathi	Ford Fiesta Rally3	Open	P
34	(Kenya) Maxine Wahome	(Kenya) Murage Waigwa	(Kenya) Maxine Wahome	Ford Fiesta Rally3	Open	P
35	(Paraguay) Diego Dominguez Jr.	(Spain) Rogelio Peñate	(Paraguay) Diego Dominguez Jr.	Ford Fiesta Rally3	Open	P

=== Itinerary ===
All dates and times are EAT (UTC+3).

Date	Time	No.	Stage name	Distance
22 June	10:01	—	Loldia [Shakedown]	5.40 km
23 June	14:08	SS1	Super Special Kasarani	4.84 km
24 June	8:00	SS2	Loldia 1	19.17 km
24 June	9:18	SS3	Geothermal 1	11.68 km
24 June	10:11	SS4	Kedong 1	31.25 km
24 June	13:09	SS5	Loldia 2	19.17 km
24 June	14:27	SS6	Geothermal 2	11.68 km
24 June	15:20	SS7	Kedong 2	31.25 km
25 June	8:06	SS8	Soysambu 1	29.32 km
25 June	9:08	SS9	Elmenteita 1	15.08 km
25 June	10:01	SS10	Sleeping Warrior 1	31.04 km
25 June	14:07	SS11	Soysambu 2	29.32 km
25 June	15:08	SS12	Elmenteita 2	15.08 km
25 June	16:01	SS13	Sleeping Warrior 2	31.04 km
26 June	7:05	SS14	Oserian 1	17.52 km
26 June	8:08	SS15	Narasha 1	13.30 km
26 June	9:08	SS16	Hell's Gate 1	10.53 km
26 June	11:29	SS17	Oserian 2	17.52 km
26 June	12:32	SS18	Narasha 2	13.30 km
26 June	14:18	SS18	Hell's Gate 2 [Power Stage]	10.53 km

== Report ==
=== WRC Rally1 ===
==== Classification ====
Position		No.	Driver	Co-driver	Entrant	Car	Time	Difference	Points	
Event	Class	No.	Driver	Co-driver	Entrant	Car	Time	Difference	Event	Stage
1	1	69	Kalle Rovanperä	Jonne Halttunen	Toyota Gazoo Racing WRT	Toyota GR Yaris Rally1	3:40:24.9	0.0	25	0
2	2	33	Elfyn Evans	Scott Martin	Toyota Gazoo Racing WRT	Toyota GR Yaris Rally1	3:41:17.7	+52.8	18	0
3	3	18	Takamoto Katsuta	Aaron Johnston	Toyota Gazoo Racing WRT NG	Toyota GR Yaris Rally1	3:42:07.6	+1:42.7	15	0
4	4	1	Sébastien Ogier	Benjamin Veillas	Toyota Gazoo Racing WRT	Toyota GR Yaris Rally1	3:42:35.2	+2:10.3	12	3
5	5	11	Thierry Neuville	Martijn Wydaeghe	Hyundai Shell Mobis WRT	Hyundai i20 N Rally1	3:51:05.8	+10:40.9	10	5
6	6	42	Craig Breen	Paul Nagle	M-Sport Ford WRT	Ford Puma Rally1	4:03:52.8	+23:27.9	8	0
7	7	9	Jourdan Serderidis	Frédéric Miclotte	M-Sport Ford WRT	Ford Puma Rally1	4:10:41.4	+30:16.5	6	0
8	8	19	Sébastien Loeb	Isabelle Galmiche	M-Sport Ford WRT	Ford Puma Rally1	4:12:37.5	+32:12.6	4	4
10	9	2	Oliver Solberg	Elliott Edmondson	Hyundai Shell Mobis WRT	Hyundai i20 N Rally1	4:18:01.5	+37:36.6	1	0
15	10	16	Adrien Fourmaux	Alexandre Coria	M-Sport Ford WRT	Ford Puma Rally1	4:59:52.6	+1:19:27.7	0	1
16	11	44	Gus Greensmith	Jonas Andersson	M-Sport Ford WRT	Ford Puma Rally1	4:59:57.0	+1:19:32.1	0	2
Retired SS18		8	Ott Tänak	Martin Järveoja	Hyundai Shell Mobis WRT	Hyundai i20 N Rally1	Steering		0	0

==== Special stages ====
Stage	Winners	Car	Time	Class leaders
SD	Rovanperä / Halttunen	Toyota GR Yaris Rally1	3:42.1	—N/a
SS1	Ogier / Veillas	Toyota GR Yaris Rally1	3:18.8	Ogier / Veillas
SS2	Loeb / Galmiche	Ford Puma Rally1	14:18.8	Ogier / Veillas
SS3	Rovanperä / Halttunen	Toyota GR Yaris Rally1	6:44.2	Ogier / Veillas
SS4	Rovanperä / Halttunen	Toyota GR Yaris Rally1	17:29.9	Evans / Martin
SS5	Ogier / Veillas	Toyota GR Yaris Rally1	14:05.2	Ogier / Veillas
SS6	Ogier / Veillas	Toyota GR Yaris Rally1	6:41.4	Ogier / Veillas
SS7	Rovanperä / Halttunen	Toyota GR Yaris Rally1	17:43.2	Rovanperä / Halttunen
SS8	Evans / Martin	Toyota GR Yaris Rally1	18:14.2	Rovanperä / Halttunen
SS9	Neuville / Wydaeghe	Hyundai i20 N Rally1	8:37.0	Rovanperä / Halttunen
SS10	Neuville / Wydaeghe	Hyundai i20 N Rally1	17:18.1	Rovanperä / Halttunen
SS11	Evans / Martin	Toyota GR Yaris Rally1	18:05.3	Rovanperä / Halttunen
SS12	Rovanperä / Halttunen	Toyota GR Yaris Rally1	9:47.1	Rovanperä / Halttunen
SS13	Ogier / Veillas	Toyota GR Yaris Rally1	19:19.1	Rovanperä / Halttunen
SS14	Fourmaux / Coria	Ford Puma Rally1	11:42.1	Rovanperä / Halttunen
SS15	Rovanperä / Halttunen	Toyota GR Yaris Rally1	6:56.6	Rovanperä / Halttunen
SS16	Tänak / Järveoja	Hyundai i20 N Rally1	5:51.5	Rovanperä / Halttunen
SS17	Loeb / Galmiche	Ford Puma Rally1	9:05.7	Rovanperä / Halttunen
SS18	Loeb / Galmiche	Ford Puma Rally1	6:59.2	Rovanperä / Halttunen
SS19	Neuville / Wydaeghe	Hyundai i20 N Rally1	6:00.4	Rovanperä / Halttunen

==== Championship standings ====
Pos.	Drivers' championships			Co-drivers' championships			Manufacturers' championships		
Pos.	Move	Driver	Points	Move	Co-driver	Points	Move	Manufacturer	Points
1		Kalle Rovanperä	145		Jonne Halttunen	145		Toyota Gazoo Racing WRT	246
2		Thierry Neuville	80		Martijn Wydaeghe	80		Hyundai Shell Mobis WRT	184
3	1	Ott Tänak	62	1	Martin Järveoja	62		M-Sport Ford WRT	142
4	1	Takamoto Katsuta	62	1	Aaron Johnston	62		Toyota Gazoo Racing WRT NG	68
5	1	Craig Breen	60	1	Paul Nagle	60			

=== WRC Rally2 ===
==== Classification ====
Position		No.	Driver	Co-driver	Entrant	Car	Time	Difference	Points		
Event	Class	No.	Driver	Co-driver	Entrant	Car	Time	Difference	Class	Stage	Event
9	1	20	Kajetan Kajetanowicz	Maciej Szczepaniak	Kajetan Kajetanowicz	Škoda Fabia Rally2 evo	4:16:02.5	0.0	25	0	2
11	2	22	Sean Johnston	Alexander Kihurani	Saintéloc Junior Team	Citroën C3 Rally2	4:35:10.7	+19:08.2	18	0	0
12	3	27	Amanraaj Rai	Gurdeep Panesar	Amanraaj Rai	Škoda Fabia Rally2 evo	4:45:16.4	+29:13.9	15	0	0
18	4	28	Aakif Virani	Azhar Bhatti	Aakif Virani	Škoda Fabia Rally2 evo	5:23:53.6	+1:07:51.1	12	0	0
Retired SS7		21	Martin Prokop	Michal Ernst	Martin Prokop	Ford Fiesta Rally2	Engine		0	0	0
Retired SS4		24	Gaurav Gill	Gabriel Morales	Gaurav Gill	Škoda Fabia R5	Mechanical		0	0	0
Retired SS13		25	Karan Patel	Tauseef Khan	Karan Patel	Ford Fiesta R5	Excluded		0	0	0
Retired SS13		26	Leroy Gomes	Urshlla Gomes	Leroy Gomes	Ford Fiesta R5	Mechanical		0	0	0

==== Special stages ====
Stage	Open Championship				Junior Championship			
Stage	Winners	Car	Time	Class leaders	Winners	Car	Time	Class leaders
SD	Gill / Morales	Škoda Fabia R5	4:04.0	—N/a	No stage winners			—N/a
SS1	Gill / Morales	Škoda Fabia R5	3:32.9	Kajetanowicz / Szczepaniak	Rai / Panesar	Škoda Fabia Rally2 evo	3:48.7	Rai / Panesar
SS2	Kajetanowicz / Szczepaniak	Škoda Fabia Rally2 evo	15:22.6	Kajetanowicz / Szczepaniak	Rai / Panesar	Škoda Fabia Rally2 evo	17:34.3	Rai / Panesar
SS3	Gill / Morales	Škoda Fabia R5	7:23.7	Kajetanowicz / Szczepaniak	Rai / Panesar	Škoda Fabia Rally2 evo	9:04.0	Rai / Panesar
SS4	Kajetanowicz / Szczepaniak	Škoda Fabia Rally2 evo	19:53.7	Kajetanowicz / Szczepaniak	Rai / Panesar	Škoda Fabia Rally2 evo	24:07.9	Rai / Panesar
SS5	Kajetanowicz / Szczepaniak	Škoda Fabia Rally2 evo	15:18.8	Kajetanowicz / Szczepaniak	Rai / Panesar	Škoda Fabia Rally2 evo	17:45.9	Rai / Panesar
SS6	Kajetanowicz / Szczepaniak	Škoda Fabia Rally2 evo	7:28.5	Kajetanowicz / Szczepaniak	Rai / Panesar	Škoda Fabia Rally2 evo	8:57.2	Rai / Panesar
SS7	Johnston / Kihurani	Citroën C3 Rally2	21:27.1	Kajetanowicz / Szczepaniak	Stage interrupted			
SS8	Kajetanowicz / Szczepaniak	Škoda Fabia Rally2 evo	21:30.9	Kajetanowicz / Szczepaniak	Rai / Panesar	Škoda Fabia Rally2 evo	24:05.7	Rai / Panesar
SS9	Kajetanowicz / Szczepaniak	Škoda Fabia Rally2 evo	9:45.4	Kajetanowicz / Szczepaniak	Rai / Panesar	Škoda Fabia Rally2 evo	11:12.9	Rai / Panesar
SS10	Kajetanowicz / Szczepaniak	Škoda Fabia Rally2 evo	20:09.9	Kajetanowicz / Szczepaniak	Rai / Panesar	Škoda Fabia Rally2 evo	22:08.1	Rai / Panesar
SS11	Kajetanowicz / Szczepaniak	Škoda Fabia Rally2 evo	21:03.8	Kajetanowicz / Szczepaniak	Rai / Panesar	Škoda Fabia Rally2 evo	23:20.6	Rai / Panesar
SS12	Kajetanowicz / Szczepaniak	Škoda Fabia Rally2 evo	11:59.0	Kajetanowicz / Szczepaniak	Rai / Panesar	Škoda Fabia Rally2 evo	13:08.2	Rai / Panesar
SS13	Kajetanowicz / Szczepaniak	Škoda Fabia Rally2 evo	24:56.2	Kajetanowicz / Szczepaniak	Rai / Panesar	Škoda Fabia Rally2 evo	26:38.7	Rai / Panesar
SS14	Stage interrupted							
SS15	Johnston / Kihurani	Citroën C3 Rally2	8:09.3	Kajetanowicz / Szczepaniak	Rai / Panesar	Škoda Fabia Rally2 evo	9:02.7	Rai / Panesar
SS16	Kajetanowicz / Szczepaniak	Škoda Fabia Rally2 evo	6:35.4	Kajetanowicz / Szczepaniak	Rai / Panesar	Škoda Fabia Rally2 evo	7:58.9	Rai / Panesar
SS17	Johnston / Kihurani	Citroën C3 Rally2	10:55.8	Kajetanowicz / Szczepaniak	Rai / Panesar	Škoda Fabia Rally2 evo	11:45.2	Rai / Panesar
SS18	Johnston / Kihurani	Citroën C3 Rally2	8:20.5	Kajetanowicz / Szczepaniak	Rai / Panesar	Škoda Fabia Rally2 evo	9:24.3	Rai / Panesar
SS19	Kajetanowicz / Szczepaniak	Škoda Fabia Rally2 evo	6:38.6	Kajetanowicz / Szczepaniak	Rai / Panesar	Škoda Fabia Rally2 evo	7:59.7	Rai / Panesar

==== Championship standings ====
Pos.	Open Drivers' championships			Open Co-drivers' championships			Teams' championships			Junior Drivers' championships			Junior Co-drivers' championships			Driver Masters' championships			Co-driver Masters' championships		
Pos.	Move	Driver	Points	Move	Co-driver	Points	Move	Manufacturer	Points	Move	Manufacturer	Points	Move	Driver	Points	Move	Driver	Points	Move	Driver	Points
1	4	Kajetan Kajetanowicz	66	3	Maciej Szczepaniak	66		Toksport WRT	87		Chris Ingram	67		James Fulton	68		Mauro Miele	61		Laurent Magat	75
2	1	Yohan Rossel	63	1	Valentin Sarreaud	52		Toksport WRT 2	58		Nikolay Gryazin	61		Louis Louka	43		Jean-Michel Raoux	52		Michael Joseph Morrissey	36
3	1	Nikolay Gryazin	52	1	Konstantin Aleksandrov	52		Hyundai Motorsport N	58		Erik Cais	45		Elia De Guio	25		Freddy Loix	40		Michela Lorigiola	30
4	1	Andreas Mikkelsen	51	1	Torstein Eriksen	51		Yaco ACCR Team	50		Eerik Pietarinen	40		Samu Vaaleri	25		Olivier Burri	33		Jörgen Fornander	25
5	1	Chris Ingram	44		Craig Drew	38		Saintéloc Junior Team	40		Mikołaj Marczyk	36					Fabrizio Arengi	28		Hans van Goor	25

=== WRC Rally3 ===
==== Classification ====
Position		No.	Driver	Co-driver	Entrant	Car	Time	Difference	Points
Event	Class	No.	Driver	Co-driver	Entrant	Car	Time	Difference	Open
17	1	34	Maxine Wahome	Murage Waigwa	Maxine Wahome	Ford Fiesta Rally3	5:20:21.6	0.0	25
21	2	30	Jeremy Wahome	Victor Okundi	Jeremy Wahome	Ford Fiesta Rally3	5:45:49.0	+25:27.4	18
23	3	32	McRae Kimathi	Mwangi Kioni	McRae Kimathi	Ford Fiesta Rally3	5:55:59.9	+35:37.7	15
Retired SS18		31	Hamza Anwar	Adnan Din	Hamza Anwar	Ford Fiesta Rally3	Mechanical		0
Retired SS4		35	Diego Dominguez Jr.	Rogelio Peñate	Diego Dominguez Jr.	Ford Fiesta Rally3	Accident		0

==== Special stages ====
Stage	Open Championship			
Stage	Winners	Car	Time	Class leaders
SD	Dominguez Jr. / Peñate	Ford Fiesta Rally3	4:49.8	—N/a
SS1	Dominguez Jr. / Peñate	Ford Fiesta Rally3	3:43.2	Dominguez Jr. / Peñate
SS2	Dominguez Jr. / Peñate	Ford Fiesta Rally3	16:53.4	Dominguez Jr. / Peñate
SS3	Dominguez Jr. / Peñate	Ford Fiesta Rally3	8:34.2	Dominguez Jr. / Peñate
SS4	Stage interrupted			
SS5	Kimathi / Kioni	Ford Fiesta Rally3	17:44.9	M. Wahome / Waigwa
SS6	Kimathi / Kioni	Ford Fiesta Rally3	9:06.5	M. Wahome / Waigwa
SS7	Stage interrupted			
SS8	J. Wahome / Okundi	Ford Fiesta Rally3	23:04.0	M. Wahome / Waigwa
SS9	J. Wahome / Okundi	Ford Fiesta Rally3	10:50.6	M. Wahome / Waigwa
SS10	J. Wahome / Okundi	Ford Fiesta Rally3	21:32.4	M. Wahome / Waigwa
SS11	J. Wahome / Okundi	Ford Fiesta Rally3	22:17.7	M. Wahome / Waigwa
SS12	J. Wahome / Okundi	Ford Fiesta Rally3	12:45.8	M. Wahome / Waigwa
SS13	Anwar / Din	Ford Fiesta Rally3	26:05.4	M. Wahome / Waigwa
SS14	Stage interrupted			
SS15	Anwar / Din	Ford Fiesta Rally3	9:20.3	M. Wahome / Waigwa
SS16	Anwar / Din	Ford Fiesta Rally3	8:11.1	M. Wahome / Waigwa
SS17	J. Wahome / Okundi	Ford Fiesta Rally3	11:59.7	M. Wahome / Waigwa
SS18	J. Wahome / Okundi	Ford Fiesta Rally3	10:24.4	M. Wahome / Waigwa
SS19	J. Wahome / Okundi	Ford Fiesta Rally3	8:29.4	M. Wahome / Waigwa

==== Championship standings ====
Pos.	Open Drivers' championships			Open Co-drivers' championships		
Pos.	Move	Driver	Points	Move	Co-driver	Points
1		Sami Pajari	62		Enni Mälkönen	62
2	5	McRae Kimathi	45		Mikael Korhonen	43
3	1	Jan Černý	43		Tamás Kürti	43
4	1	Zoltán László	43		Manuel Fenoli	33
5	1	Lauri Joona	43		Liam Regan	30

Previous rally: 2022 Rally Italia Sardegna	2022 FIA World Rally Championship	Next rally: 2022 Rally Estonia
Previous rally: 2021 Safari Rally	2022 Safari Rally	Next rally: 2023 Safari Rally
