= James Fulton (co-driver) =

Irish rally co-driver (born 1992)

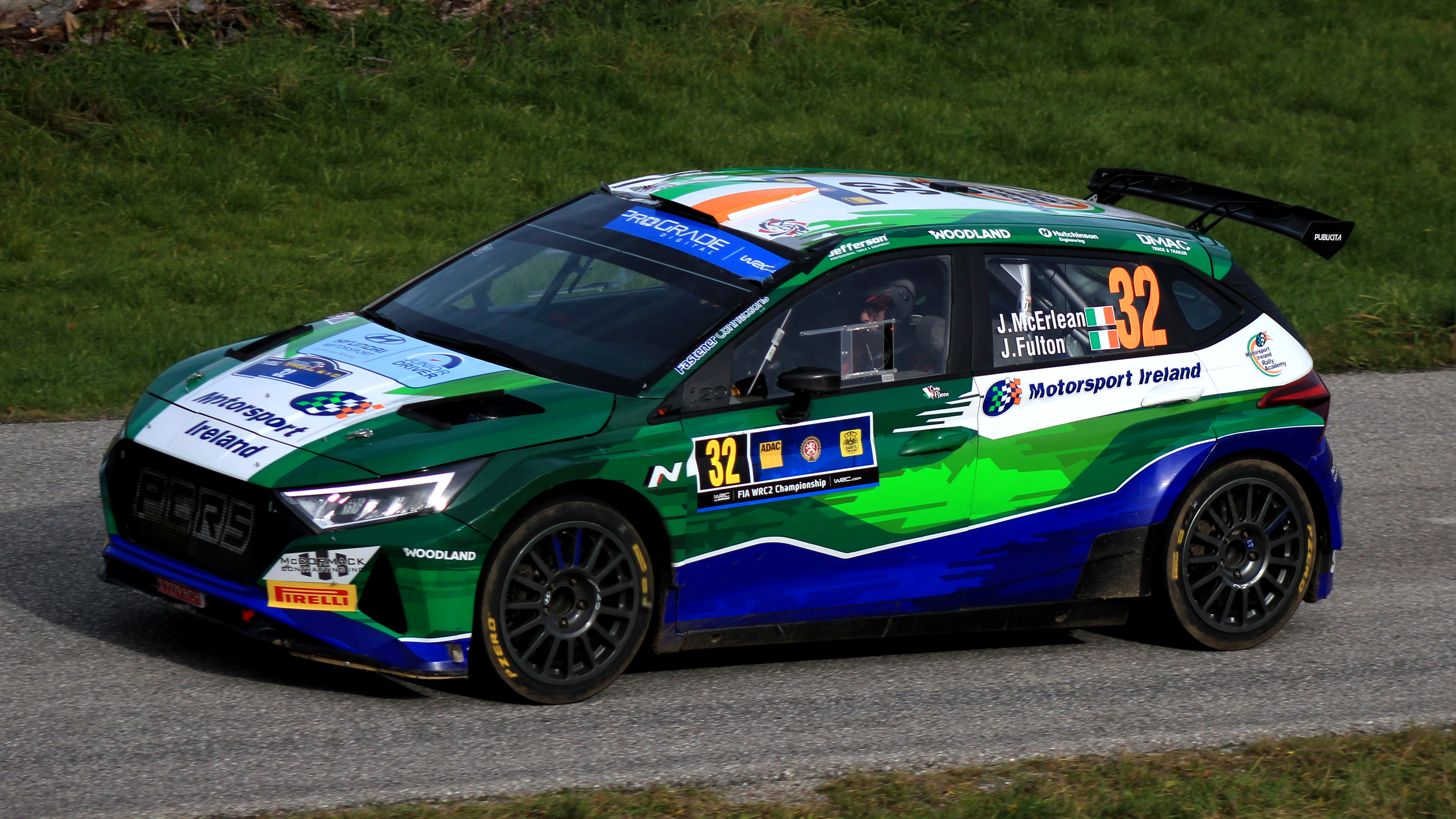

Personal information
- Nationality: (Republic of Ireland) Irish
- Born: 9 March 1992 (age 34)

World Rally Championship record
- Years active: 2020–present
- Driver: (Republic of Ireland) Barry McKenna (Republic of Ireland) Josh McErlean (Republic of Ireland) Craig Breen (United Kingdom) Kris Meeke (Japan) Yuki Yamamoto (Japan) Takamoto Katsuta
- Teams: M-Sport Ford World Rally Team, Hyundai Shell Mobis WRT, Toyota Gazoo Racing NG
- Rallies: 26
- Championships: 0
- Rally wins: 0
- Podiums: 1
- Stage wins: 7
- Total points: 26
- First rally: 2020 Rally Mexico

James Fulton (born 9 March 1992) is an Irish rally co-driver. He co-drove with Craig Breen for M-Sport Ford beginning with the 2022 Rally Japan, replacing Paul Nagle. Fulton was in the car when Breen died in a testing accident ahead of the 2023 Croatia Rally. Fulton was uninjured.

== Rally results ==
=== WRC results ===
Year	Entrant	Car	1	2	3	4	5	6	7	8	9	10	11	12	13	14	WDC	Points
2020	Barry McKenna	Škoda Fabia R5	MON	SWE	MEX; Ret	EST	TUR	ITA	MNZ								NC	0
2021	Josh McErlean	Hyundai i20 R5	MON	ARC	CRO	POR	ITA	KEN	EST	BEL; 12	GRE	FIN	ESP; 17				NC	0
2021	Josh McErlean	Hyundai i20 N Rally2												MNZ; 19			NC	0
2022	Josh McErlean	Hyundai i20 N Rally2	MON	SWE; 29	CRO	POR; 40	ITA; 28	KEN	EST; 19	FIN; 34	BEL; Ret	GRE	NZL	ESP; 21			27th	5
2022	M-Sport Ford WRT	Ford Puma Rally1													JPN; 24		27th	5
2023	Hyundai Shell Mobis WRT	Hyundai i20 N Rally1	MON	SWE; 2	MEX	CRO; WD											14th	19
2023	Kris Meeke	Hyundai i20 N Rally2					POR; Ret	ITA	KEN								14th	19
2023	Motorsport Ireland Rally Academy	Hyundai i20 N Rally2								EST; 16	FIN; 19	GRE	CHL	EUR; 45	JPN		14th	19
2024	Toksport WRT 2	Škoda Fabia RS Rally2	MON	SWE	KEN	CRO	POR; 9	ITA; 13	POL; Ret	LAT; 21	FIN; 12	GRE; 9	CHL	EUR; 11	JPN; 30		29th	2
2025	Toyota Gazoo Racing NG	Toyota GR Yaris Rally2	MON	SWE; 17	KEN	ESP	POR	ITA	GRE	EST	FIN	PAR	CHL	EUR	JPN	SAU	NC*	0*

* Season still in progress.
