= 2024 Rally Latvia =

12th edition of Rally Liepāja

2024 Rally Latvia Tet Rally Latvia 2024
Round 8 of 13 in the 2024 World Rally Championship
← Previous event	Next event →
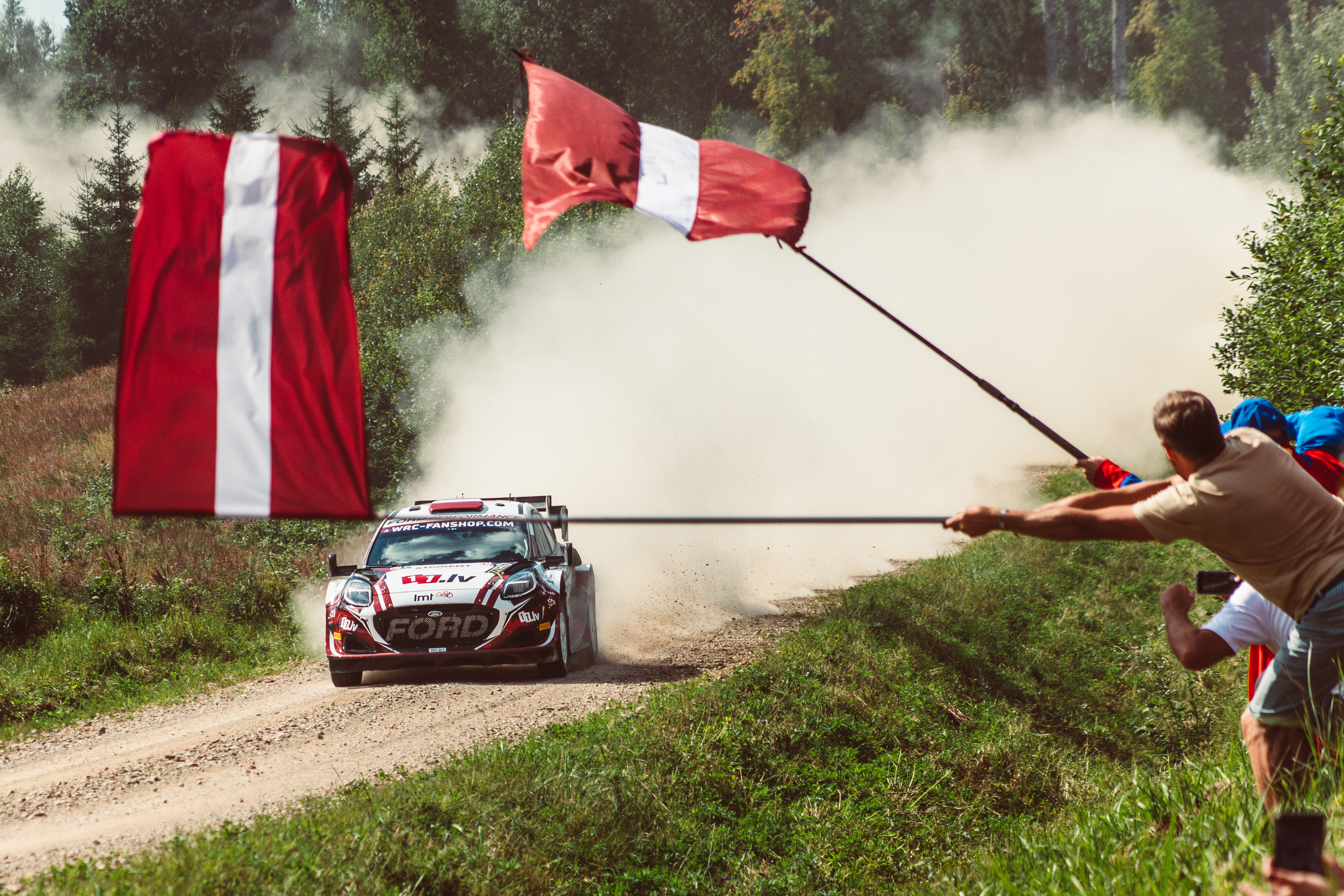
- Local heroes Mārtiņš Sesks and Renārs Francis during the event.
- Host country: Latvia
- Rally base: Liepāja, Kurzeme Planning Region
- Dates run: 18 – 21 July 2024
- Start location: Biķernieki Parish, Augšdaugava Municipality
- Finish location: Vecpils Parish, South Kurzeme Municipality
- Stages: 20 (300.13 km; 186.49 miles)
- Stage surface: Gravel
- Transport distance: 1,048.70 km (651.63 miles)
- Overall distance: 1,348.83 km (838.12 miles)

Statistics
- Crews registered: 40
- Crews: 38 at start, 32 at finish

Overall results
- Overall winner: (Finland) Kalle Rovanperä (Finland) Jonne Halttunen (Japan) Toyota Gazoo Racing WRT; 2:31:47.6
- Saturday Overall leader: (Finland) Kalle Rovanperä (Finland) Jonne Halttunen (Japan) Toyota Gazoo Racing WRT; 1:58:55.6
- Sunday Accumulated leader: (Estonia) Ott Tänak (Estonia) Martin Järveoja (South Korea) Hyundai Shell Mobis WRT; 32:48.5
- Power Stage winner: (Estonia) Ott Tänak (Estonia) Martin Järveoja (South Korea) Hyundai Shell Mobis WRT; 7:06.0

Support category results
- WRC-2 winner: (Sweden) Oliver Solberg (United Kingdom) Elliott Edmondson (Germany) Toksport WRT; 2:40:25.5
- WRC-3 winner: (Estonia) Joosep Ralf Nõgene (Estonia) Hendrik Kraav (Estonia) LightGrey; 2:51:52.1

The 2024 Rally Latvia (also known as the Tet Rally Latvia 2024) was a motor racing event for rally cars that was held over four days from 18 to 21 July 2024. It marked the twelfth running of the Rally Liepāja, and is the eighth round of the 2024 World Rally Championship, World Rally Championship-2 and World Rally Championship-3. The 2024 event was based in Liepāja in Kurzeme Planning Region, and was contested over twenty special stages, covering a total competitive distance of 300.13 km (186.49 mi).

Kalle Rovanperä and Jonne Halttunen won the rally, and their team, Toyota Gazoo Racing WRT, won the manufacturer's titles. Oliver Solberg and Elliott Edmondson won the World Rally Championship-2 category. Joosep Ralf Nõgene and Aleks Lesk won the World Rally Championship-3 category.

== Background ==
=== Entry list ===
The following crews entered into the rally. The event was opened to crews competing in the World Rally Championship, its support categories, the World Rally Championship-2, World Rally Championship-3 and privateer entries that were not registered to score points in any championship. Ten entered under Rally1 regulations, as were nineteen Rally2 crews in the World Rally Championship-2 and four Rally3 crew in the World Rally Championship-3.

Rally1 entries competing in the World Rally Championship
No.	Driver	Co-Driver	Entrant	Car	Championship eligibility	Tyre
4	(Finland) Esapekka Lappi	(Finland) Janne Ferm	(South Korea) Hyundai Shell Mobis WRT	Hyundai i20 N Rally1	Driver, Co-driver, Manufacturer	P
8	(Estonia) Ott Tänak	(Estonia) Martin Järveoja	(South Korea) Hyundai Shell Mobis WRT	Hyundai i20 N Rally1	Driver, Co-driver, Manufacturer	P
11	(Belgium) Thierry Neuville	(Belgium) Martijn Wydaeghe	(South Korea) Hyundai Shell Mobis WRT	Hyundai i20 N Rally1	Driver, Co-driver, Manufacturer	P
13	(Luxembourg) Grégoire Munster	(Belgium) Louis Louka	(United Kingdom) M-Sport Ford WRT	Ford Puma Rally1	Driver, Co-driver, Manufacturer	P
16	(France) Adrien Fourmaux	(France) Alexandre Coria	(United Kingdom) M-Sport Ford WRT	Ford Puma Rally1	Driver, Co-driver, Manufacturer	P
17	(France) Sébastien Ogier	(France) Vincent Landais	(Japan) Toyota Gazoo Racing WRT	Toyota GR Yaris Rally1	Driver, Co-driver, Manufacturer	P
18	(Japan) Takamoto Katsuta	(Republic of Ireland) Aaron Johnston	(Japan) Toyota Gazoo Racing WRT	Toyota GR Yaris Rally1	Driver, Co-driver	P
22	(Latvia) Mārtiņš Sesks	(Latvia) Renārs Francis	(United Kingdom) M-Sport Ford WRT	Ford Puma Rally1	Driver, Co-driver	P
33	(United Kingdom) Elfyn Evans	(United Kingdom) Scott Martin	(Japan) Toyota Gazoo Racing WRT	Toyota GR Yaris Rally1	Driver, Co-driver, Manufacturer	P
69	(Finland) Kalle Rovanperä	(Finland) Jonne Halttunen	(Japan) Toyota Gazoo Racing WRT	Toyota GR Yaris Rally1	Driver, Co-driver, Manufacturer	P

Rally2 entries competing in the World Rally Championship-2
No.	Driver	Co-Driver	Entrant	Car	Championship eligibility	Tyre
20	(Sweden) Oliver Solberg	(United Kingdom) Elliott Edmondson	(Germany) Toksport WRT	Škoda Fabia RS Rally2	Driver, Co-driver, Team	P
21	(Finland) Sami Pajari	(Finland) Enni Mälkönen	(Finland) Printsport	Toyota GR Yaris Rally2	Challenger Driver, Challenger Co-driver	P
24	(United Kingdom) Gus Greensmith	(Sweden) Jonas Andersson	(Germany) Toksport WRT	Škoda Fabia RS Rally2	Team	P
25	(Republic of Ireland) Josh McErlean	(Republic of Ireland) James Fulton	(Germany) Toksport WRT 2	Škoda Fabia RS Rally2	Challenger Driver, Challenger Co-driver, Team	P
26	(Paraguay) Fabrizio Zaldivar	(Italy) Marcelo Der Ohannesian	(Paraguay) Fabrizio Zaldivar	Škoda Fabia RS Rally2	Challenger Driver, Challenger Co-driver	P
27	(Finland) Mikko Heikkilä	(Finland) Kristian Temonen	(Finland) Mikko Heikkilä	Toyota GR Yaris Rally2	Challenger Driver, Challenger Co-driver	P
28	(Finland) Emil Lindholm	(Finland) Reeta Hämäläinen	(Finland) Emil Lindholm	Hyundai i20 N Rally2	Driver, Co-driver	P
29	(Italy) Roberto Daprà	(Italy) Luca Guglielmetti	(Italy) Roberto Daprà	Škoda Fabia Rally2 evo	Challenger Driver, Challenger Co-driver	P
30	(Italy) Mauro Miele	(Italy) Luca Beltrame	(Italy) Mauro Miele	Škoda Fabia RS Rally2	Challenger/Masters Driver, Challenger Co-driver	P
31	(Germany) Armin Kremer	(Germany) Ella Kremer	(Germany) Armin Kremer	Škoda Fabia RS Rally2	Challenger/Masters Driver, Challenger Co-driver	P
32	(Republic of Ireland) William Creighton	(Republic of Ireland) Liam Regan	(Republic of Ireland) Motorsport Ireland Rally Academy	Ford Fiesta Rally2	Challenger Driver, Challenger Co-driver	P
34	(Finland) Teemu Suninen	(Finland) Mikko Markkula	(Finland) Teemu Suninen	Hyundai i20 N Rally2	Driver, Co-driver	P
35	(Estonia) Gregor Jeets	(Estonia) Timo Taniel	(Estonia) Gregor Jeets	Toyota GR Yaris Rally2	Challenger Driver, Challenger Co-driver	P
36	(Paraguay) Miguel Zaldivar Jr.	(Argentina) Diego Cagnotti	(Paraguay) Miguel Zaldivar Jr.	Škoda Fabia RS Rally2	Challenger Driver, Challenger Co-driver	P
37	(Saudi Arabia) Rakan Al-Rashed	(Portugal) Hugo Magalhães	(Finland) Printsport	Škoda Fabia RS Rally2	Challenger Driver, Challenger Co-driver	P
38	(Turkey) Uğur Soylu	(Turkey) Sener Guray	(Turkey) Uğur Soylu	Škoda Fabia RS Rally2	Challenger/Masters Driver, Challenger Co-driver	P
39	(Latvia) Matīss Mežaks	(Latvia) Arnis Ronis	(Latvia) Matīss Mežaks	Škoda Fabia Rally2 evo	Challenger Driver, Challenger Co-driver	P
40	(Canada) Brandon Semenuk	(United Kingdom) Keaton Williams	(Canada) Brandon Semenuk	Toyota GR Yaris Rally2	Challenger Driver, Challenger Co-driver	P
41	(Latvia) Artūrs Priednieks	(Latvia) Janis Kirkovalds	(Latvia) Artūrs Priednieks	Škoda Fabia RS Rally2	Challenger/Masters Driver, Challenger Co-driver	P

Rally3 entries competing in the World Rally Championship-3
No.	Driver	Co-Driver	Entrant	Car	Tyre
43	(Czech Republic) Jan Černý	(Czech Republic) Ondřej Krajča	(Czech Republic) Jan Černý	Ford Fiesta Rally3	—N/a
44	(Estonia) Joosep Ralf Nõgene	(Estonia) Hendrik Kraav	(Estonia) LightGrey	Renault Clio Rally3	P
45	(Turkey) Kerem Kazaz	(France) Corentin Silvestre	(Turkey) Atölye Kazaz	Ford Fiesta Rally3	P
46	(Chinese Taipei) Enola Hsieh	(Finland) Matias Peippo	(Latvia) Sports Racing Technologies	Ford Fiesta Rally3	—N/a

Other major entries
No.	Driver	Co-Driver	Entrant	Car	Tyre
23	(Bulgaria) Nikolay Gryazin	(Latvia) Andris Mālnieks	(Bulgaria) Nikolay Gryazin	Citroën C3 Rally2	P

=== Itinerary ===
All dates and times are EEST (UTC+3).

Date	No.	Time span	Stage name	Distance
18 July	—	After 7:01	Cimdenieki [Shakedown]	3.58 km
18 July		After 18:15	Opening ceremony, Riga City Council	—N/a
18 July	SS1	After 20:05	Biķernieki Track	11.00 km
19 July		9:20 – 9:40	Tyre fitting zone A, Tukums	—N/a
19 July	SS2	After 10:00	Milzkalne 1	4.99 km
19 July	SS3	After 10:45	Tukums 1	27.56 km
19 July	SS4	After 12:00	Andumi	17.86 km
19 July		13:05 – 13:50	Regroup, Tukums	—N/a
19 July		13:50 – 14:10	Tyre fitting zone B, Tukums	—N/a
19 July	SS5	After 14:30	Milzkalne 2	4.99 km
19 July	SS6	After 15:15	Tukums 2	27.56 km
19 July	SS7	After 16:30	Strazde	17.44 km
19 July	SS8	After 17:20	Talsi	20.52 km
19 July		20:20 – 21:05	Flexi service A, Liepāja	—N/a
20 July	SS9	After 8:20	Pilskalns	18.87 km
20 July	SS10	After 9:35	Snēpele	17.52 km
20 July		10:30 – 11:00	Regroup, Kuldīga	—N/a
20 July	SS11	After 11:30	Īvande	23.04 km
20 July	SS12	After 13:05	Vecpils 1	12.64 km
20 July		14:10 – 14:30	Regroup, Liepāja	—N/a
20 July		14:30 – 15:10	Service B, Liepāja	—N/a
20 July	SS13	After 16:05	Podnieki	10.09 km
20 July	SS14	After 17:05	Vecpils 2	12.64 km
20 July		17:50 – 18:35	Regroup, Offroad track Vecpils	—N/a
20 July	SS15	After 19:00	Dinsdurbe	6.64 km
20 July	SS16	After 20:15	Liepāja City Stage	2.56 km
20 July		20:55 – 21:40	Flexi service C, Liepāja	—N/a
21 July	SS17	After 8:55	Krogzemji 1	18.70 km
21 July	SS18	After 10:05	Mazilmāja 1	13.34 km
21 July		10:20 – 10:55	Regroup, Offroad track Vecpils	—N/a
21 July	SS19	After 11:55	Krogzemji 2	18.70 km
21 July		12:55 – 13:52	Regroup, Offroad track Vecpils	—N/a
21 July	SS20	After 14:15	Mazilmāja 2 [Power Stage]	13.34 km
21 July		After 15:15	Podium ceremony, Offroad track Vecpils	—N/a

== Report ==
=== WRC Rally1 ===
==== Classification ====
Position		No.	Driver	Co-driver	Entrant	Car	Time	Difference	Points			
Event	Class	No.	Driver	Co-driver	Entrant	Car	Time	Difference	SAT	SUN	WPS	Total
1	1	69	Kalle Rovanperä	Jonne Halttunen	Toyota Gazoo Racing WRT	Toyota GR Yaris Rally1	2:31:47.6	0.0	18	5	0	23
2	2	17	Sébastien Ogier	Vincent Landais	Toyota Gazoo Racing WRT	Toyota GR Yaris Rally1	2:32:26.8	+39.2	15	6	4	25
3	3	8	Ott Tänak	Martin Järveoja	Hyundai Shell Mobis WRT	Hyundai i20 N Rally1	2:32:52.1	+1:04.5	10	7	5	22
4	4	16	Adrien Fourmaux	Alexandre Coria	M-Sport Ford WRT	Ford Puma Rally1	2:33:19.1	+1:31.5	8	2	0	10
5	5	33	Elfyn Evans	Scott Martin	Toyota Gazoo Racing WRT	Toyota GR Yaris Rally1	2:33:30.3	+1:42.7	6	4	1	11
6	6	18	Takamoto Katsuta	Aaron Johnston	Toyota Gazoo Racing WRT	Toyota GR Yaris Rally1	2:33:54.6	+2:07.0	4	1	2	7
7	7	22	Mārtiņš Sesks	Renārs Francis	M-Sport Ford WRT	Ford Puma Rally1	2:34:33.0	+2:45.4	13	0	0	13
8	8	11	Thierry Neuville	Martijn Wydaeghe	Hyundai Shell Mobis WRT	Hyundai i20 N Rally1	2:34:34.0	+2:46.4	3	3	3	9
9	9	13	Grégoire Munster	Louis Louka	M-Sport Ford WRT	Ford Puma Rally1	2:37:10.7	+5:23.1	2	0	0	2
Retired SS20		4	Esapekka Lappi	Janne Ferm	Hyundai Shell Mobis WRT	Hyundai i20 N Rally1	Technical		0	0	0	0

==== Special stages ====
Stage	Winners	Car	Time	Class leaders
SD	Tänak / Järveoja	Hyundai i20 N Rally1	1:33.6	—N/a
SS1	Rovanperä / Halttunen	Toyota GR Yaris Rally1	7:28.5	Rovanperä / Halttunen
SS2	Rovanperä / Halttunen	Toyota GR Yaris Rally1	2:31.8	Rovanperä / Halttunen
SS3	Sesks / Francis	Ford Puma Rally1	13:40.0	Rovanperä / Halttunen
SS4	Sesks / Francis	Ford Puma Rally1	9:12.5	Rovanperä / Halttunen
SS5	Ogier / Landais	Toyota GR Yaris Rally1	2:29.6	Rovanperä / Halttunen
SS6	Rovanperä / Halttunen	Toyota GR Yaris Rally1	13:27.5	Rovanperä / Halttunen
SS7	Rovanperä / Halttunen	Toyota GR Yaris Rally1	8:22.3	Rovanperä / Halttunen
SS8	Rovanperä / Halttunen	Toyota GR Yaris Rally1	11:30.4	Rovanperä / Halttunen
SS9	Rovanperä / Halttunen	Toyota GR Yaris Rally1	8:53.9	Rovanperä / Halttunen
SS10	Rovanperä / Halttunen	Toyota GR Yaris Rally1	8:15.6	Rovanperä / Halttunen
SS11	Tänak / Järveoja	Hyundai i20 N Rally1	11:23.3	Rovanperä / Halttunen
SS12	Rovanperä / Halttunen	Toyota GR Yaris Rally1	5:52.1	Rovanperä / Halttunen
SS13	Rovanperä / Halttunen	Toyota GR Yaris Rally1	5:06.1	Rovanperä / Halttunen
SS14	Rovanperä / Halttunen	Toyota GR Yaris Rally1	5:40.1	Rovanperä / Halttunen
SS15	Ogier / Landais	Toyota GR Yaris Rally1	2:54.4	Rovanperä / Halttunen
SS16	Rovanperä / Halttunen	Toyota GR Yaris Rally1	2:02.5	Rovanperä / Halttunen
SS17	Ogier / Landais	Toyota GR Yaris Rally1	9:19.2	Rovanperä / Halttunen
SS18	Tänak / Järveoja	Hyundai i20 N Rally1	7:09.0	Rovanperä / Halttunen
SS19	Tänak / Järveoja	Hyundai i20 N Rally1	9:12.2	Rovanperä / Halttunen
SS20	Tänak / Järveoja	Hyundai i20 N Rally1	7:06.0	Rovanperä / Halttunen

==== Championship standings ====
Pos.	Drivers' championships			Co-drivers' championships			Manufacturers' championships		
Pos.	Move	Driver	Points	Move	Co-driver	Points	Move	Manufacturer	Points
1		Thierry Neuville	145		Martijn Wydaeghe	145		Hyundai Shell Mobis WRT	351
2	1	Ott Tänak	137	1	Martin Järveoja	137		Toyota Gazoo Racing WRT	350
3	1	Elfyn Evans	132	1	Scott Martin	132		M-Sport Ford WRT	177
4		Sébastien Ogier	117		Vincent Landais	117			
5		Adrien Fourmaux	101		Alexandre Coria	101			

=== WRC-2 Rally2 ===
==== Classification ====
Position		No.	Driver	Co-driver	Entrant	Car	Time	Difference	Points	
Event	Class	No.	Driver	Co-driver	Entrant	Car	Time	Difference	Class	Event
10	1	25	Oliver Solberg	Elliott Edmondson	Toksport WRT	Škoda Fabia RS Rally2	2:40:25.5	0.0	25	1
11	2	27	Mikko Heikkilä	Kristian Temonen	Mikko Heikkilä	Toyota GR Yaris Rally2	2:41:02.9	+37.4	18	0
12	3	25	Sami Pajari	Enni Mälkönen	Printsport	Toyota GR Yaris Rally2	2:41:10.3	+44.8	15	0
15	4	26	Fabrizio Zaldivar	Marcelo Der Ohannesian	Fabrizio Zaldivar	Škoda Fabia RS Rally2	2:43:27.3	+3:01.8	12	0
16	5	32	William Creighton	Liam Regan	Motorsport Ireland Rally Academy	Ford Fiesta Rally2	2:44:53.2	+4:27.7	10	0
17	6	34	Roberto Daprà	Luca Guglielmetti	Roberto Daprà	Škoda Fabia Rally2 evo	2:45:10.8	+4:45.3	8	0
19	7	40	Gregor Jeets	Timo Taniel	Gregor Jeets	Toyota GR Yaris Rally2	2:49:47.9	+9:22.4	6	0
21	8	47	Josh McErlean	James Fulton	Toksport WRT 2	Škoda Fabia RS Rally2	2:52:00.4	+11:34.9	4	0
22	9	31	Armin Kremer	Ella Kremer	Armin Kremer	Škoda Fabia RS Rally2	2:52:14.6	+11:49.1	2	0
23	10	37	Rakan Al-Rashed	Hugo Magalhães	Printsport	Škoda Fabia RS Rally2	2:56:22.4	+15:56.9	1	0
26	11	39	Matīss Mežaks	Arnis Ronis	Matīss Mežaks	Škoda Fabia Rally2 evo	3:03:25.7	+23:00.2	0	0
28	12	41	Artūrs Priednieks	Janis Kirkovalds	Artūrs Priednieks	Škoda Fabia RS Rally2	3:14:08.4	+33:42.9	0	0
29	13	59	Uğur Soylu	Sener Guray	Uğur Soylu	Škoda Fabia RS Rally2	3:24:00.6	+43:35.1	0	0
30	14	36	Miguel Zaldivar Jr.	Diego Cagnotti	Miguel Zaldivar Jr.	Škoda Fabia RS Rally2	3:35:25.6	+55:00.1	0	0
32	15	41	Teemu Suninen	Mikko Markkula	Teemu Suninen	Hyundai i20 N Rally2	3:51:34.5	+1:11:09.0	0	0
Retired SS14		28	Emil Lindholm	Reeta Hämäläinen	Emil Lindholm	Hyundai i20 N Rally2	Rolled		0	0
Retired SS14		40	Brandon Semenuk	Keaton Williams	Brandon Semenuk	Toyota GR Yaris Rally2	Rolled		0	0
Retired SS12		30	Mauro Miele	Luca Beltrame	Mauro Miele	Škoda Fabia RS Rally2	Rolled		0	0

==== Special stages ====
Overall
Stage	Winners	Car	Time	Class leaders
SD	Solberg / Edmondson	Škoda Fabia RS Rally2	1:41.2	—N/a
SS1	Solberg / Edmondson	Škoda Fabia RS Rally2	7:45.1	Solberg / Edmondson
SS2	Solberg / Edmondson	Škoda Fabia RS Rally2	2:39.8	Solberg / Edmondson
SS3	Solberg / Edmondson	Škoda Fabia RS Rally2	14:16.5	Solberg / Edmondson
SS4	Solberg / Edmondson	Škoda Fabia RS Rally2	9:39.0	Solberg / Edmondson
SS5	Solberg / Edmondson	Škoda Fabia RS Rally2	2:38.5	Solberg / Edmondson
SS6	Solberg / Edmondson	Škoda Fabia RS Rally2	14:10.8	Solberg / Edmondson
SS7	Solberg / Edmonson	Škoda Fabia RS Rally2	8:53.1	Solberg / Edmondson
SS8	Pajari / Mälkönen	Toyota GR Yaris Rally2	12:06.5	Solberg / Edmondson
SS9	Pajari / Mälkönen	Toyota GR Yaris Rally2	9:24.4	Solberg / Edmondson
SS10	Pajari / Mälkönen	Toyota GR Yaris Rally2	8:48.3	Solberg / Edmondson
SS11	Heikkilä / Temonen	Toyota GR Yaris Rally2	12:02.6	Solberg / Edmondson
SS12	Solberg / Edmondson	Škoda Fabia RS Rally2	6:14.7	Solberg / Edmondson
SS13	Solberg / Edmondson	Škoda Fabia RS Rally2	5:27.0	Solberg / Edmondson
SS14	Pajari / Mälkönen	Toyota GR Yaris Rally2	6:03.3	Solberg / Edmondson
SS15	Heikkilä / Temonen	Toyota GR Yaris Rally2	3:05.9	Solberg / Edmondson
SS16	Pajari / Mälkönen	Toyota GR Yaris Rally2	2:07.8	Solberg / Edmondson
SS17	Solberg / Edmondson	Škoda Fabia RS Rally2	9:50.7	Solberg / Edmondson
SS18	Solberg / Edmondson	Škoda Fabia RS Rally2	7:34.5	Solberg / Edmondson
SS19	Heikkilä / Temonen	Toyota GR Yaris Rally2	9:45.8	Solberg / Edmondson
SS20	Solberg / Edmondson	Škoda Fabia RS Rally2	7:34.8	Solberg / Edmondson

Challenger
Stage	Winners	Car	Time	Class leaders
SD	Zaldivar Jr. / Cagnotti	Škoda Fabia RS Rally2	1:41.9	—N/a
SS1	Daprà / Guglielmetti	Škoda Fabia Rally2 evo	7:52.7	Daprà / Guglielmetti
SS2	McErlean / Fulton	Škoda Fabia RS Rally2	2:40.3	McErlean / Fulton
SS3	Heikkilä / Temonen	Toyota GR Yaris Rally2	14:22.0	Heikkilä / Temonen
SS4	Heikkilä / Temonen	Toyota GR Yaris Rally2	9:44.4	Heikkilä / Temonen
SS5	Pajari / Mälkönen	Toyota GR Yaris Rally2	2:38.8	Heikkilä / Temonen
SS6	Heikkilä / Temonen	Toyota GR Yaris Rally2	14:12.4	Heikkilä / Temonen
SS7	Pajari / Mälkönen	Toyota GR Yaris Rally2	8:54.2	Heikkilä / Temonen
SS8	Pajari / Mälkönen	Toyota GR Yaris Rally2	12:06.5	Heikkilä / Temonen
SS9	Pajari / Mälkönen	Toyota GR Yaris Rally2	9:24.4	Heikkilä / Temonen
SS10	Pajari / Mälkönen	Toyota GR Yaris Rally2	8:48.3	Heikkilä / Temonen
SS11	Heikkilä / Temonen	Toyota GR Yaris Rally2	12:02.6	Heikkilä / Temonen
SS12	Heikkilä / Temonen	Toyota GR Yaris Rally2	6:15.7	Heikkilä / Temonen
SS13	Heikkilä / Temonen; Pajari / Mälkönen	Toyota GR Yaris Rally2; Toyota GR Yaris Rally2	5:27.2	Heikkilä / Temonen
SS14	Pajari / Mälkönen	Toyota GR Yaris Rally2	6:03.3	Heikkilä / Temonen
SS15	Heikkilä / Temonen	Toyota GR Yaris Rally2	3:05.9	Heikkilä / Temonen
SS16	Pajari / Mälkönen	Toyota GR Yaris Rally2	2:07.8	Heikkilä / Temonen
SS17	Heikkilä / Temonen	Toyota GR Yaris Rally2	9:53.1	Heikkilä / Temonen
SS18	Pajari / Mälkönen	Toyota GR Yaris Rally2	7:37.6	Heikkilä / Temonen
SS19	Heikkilä / Temonen	Toyota GR Yaris Rally2	9:45.8	Heikkilä / Temonen
SS20	Pajari / Mälkönen	Toyota GR Yaris Rally2	7:38.1	Heikkilä / Temonen

==== Championship standings ====
Pos.	Open Drivers' championships			Open Co-drivers' championships			Teams' championships			Challenger Drivers' championships			Challenger Co-drivers' championships		
Pos.	Move	Driver	Points	Move	Co-driver	Points	Move	Manufacturer	Points	Move	Manufacturer	Points	Move	Driver	Points
1	2	Oliver Solberg	86	1	Elliott Edmondson	86		DG Sport Compétition	169		Sami Pajari	93		Enni Mälkönen	93
2		Sami Pajari	83	1	Enni Mälkönen	83		Toksport WRT	153		Jan Solans	56		Rodrigo Sanjuan de Eusebio	56
3	2	Yohan Rossel	71		Arnaud Dunand	53		Toyota Gazoo Racing WRT NG	73		Nikolay Gryazin	55		Konstantin Aleksandrov	55
4		Jan Solans	48		Rodrigo Sanjuan de Eusebio	48		Toksport WRT 2	36		Lauri Joona	53		Janni Hussi	53
5		Nikolay Gryazin	48		Konstantin Aleksandrov	48					Nicolas Ciamin	48		Yannick Roche	48

=== WRC-3 Rally3 ===
==== Classification ====
Position		No.	Driver	Co-driver	Entrant	Car	Time	Difference	Points
Event	Class	No.	Driver	Co-driver	Entrant	Car	Time	Difference	Points
20	1	44	Joosep Ralf Nõgene	Hendrik Kraav	LightGrey	Renault Clio Rally3	2:51:52.1	0.0	25
27	2	45	Kerem Kazaz	Corentin Silvestre	Atölye Kazaz	Ford Fiesta Rally3	3:11:10.4	+19:18.3	18
Did not start		43	Jan Černý	Ondřej Krajča	Jan Černý	Ford Fiesta Rally3	Withdrawn		0
Did not start		46	Enola Hsieh	Matias Peippo	Sports Racing Technologies	Ford Fiesta Rally3	Withdrawn		0

==== Special stages ====
Stage	Winners	Car	Time	Class leaders
SD	Kazaz / Silvestre	Ford Fiesta Rally3	1:49.3	—N/a
SS1	Nõgene / Kraav	Renault Clio Rally3	8:16.8	Nõgene / Kraav
SS2	Nõgene / Kraav	Renault Clio Rally3	2:52.3	Nõgene / Kraav
SS3	Nõgene / Kraav	Renault Clio Rally3	15:14.1	Nõgene / Kraav
SS4	Nõgene / Kraav	Renault Clio Rally3	10:26.5	Nõgene / Kraav
SS5	Nõgene / Kraav	Renault Clio Rally3	2:54.2	Nõgene / Kraav
SS6	Nõgene / Kraav	Renault Clio Rally3	15:06.8	Nõgene / Kraav
SS7	Nõgene / Kraav	Renault Clio Rally3	9:33.5	Nõgene / Kraav
SS8	Nõgene / Kraav	Renault Clio Rally3	13:02.3	Nõgene / Kraav
SS9	Nõgene / Kraav	Renault Clio Rally3	10:07.9	Nõgene / Kraav
SS10	Nõgene / Kraav	Renault Clio Rally3	9:37.1	Nõgene / Kraav
SS11	Nõgene / Kraav	Renault Clio Rally3	12:59.1	Nõgene / Kraav
SS12	Nõgene / Kraav	Renault Clio Rally3	6:39.8	Nõgene / Kraav
SS13	Nõgene / Kraav	Renault Clio Rally3	5:50.4	Nõgene / Kraav
SS14	Nõgene / Kraav	Renault Clio Rally3	6:33.2	Nõgene / Kraav
SS15	Nõgene / Kraav	Renault Clio Rally3	3:18.7	Nõgene / Kraav
SS16	Nõgene / Kraav	Renault Clio Rally3	2:15.5	Nõgene / Kraav
SS17	Nõgene / Kraav	Renault Clio Rally3	10:30.5	Nõgene / Kraav
SS18	Nõgene / Kraav	Renault Clio Rally3	8:05.7	Nõgene / Kraav
SS19	Nõgene / Kraav	Renault Clio Rally3	10:22.8	Nõgene / Kraav
SS20	Kazaz / Silvestre	Ford Fiesta Rally3	8:04.1	Nõgene / Kraav

==== Championship standings ====
Pos.	Drivers' championships			Co-drivers' championships		
Pos.	Move	Driver	Points	Move	Co-driver	Points
1		Diego Dominguez Jr.	75		Rogelio Peñate	75
2		Mattéo Chatillon	48		Maxence Cornuau	48
3		Jan Černý	47		Ondřej Krajča	47
4		Romet Jürgenson	43		Siim Oja	43
5		Ghjuvanni Rossi	28		Kylian Sarmezan	28

Previous rally: 2024 Rally Poland	2024 FIA World Rally Championship	Next rally: 2024 Rally Finland
Previous rally: 2023 Rally Liepāja	2024 Rally Latvia	Next rally: TBD
