= Lauri Joona =

Finnish rally driver

Personal information
- Nationality: (Finland) Finnish
- Full name: Lauri Samuli Joona
- Born: 7 December 1996 (age 29)

World Rally Championship record
- Years active: 2020–present
- Co-driver: (Finland) Antti Linnaketo (Finland) Samu Vaaleri (Finland) Janni Hussi (Finland) Tuukka Shemeikka (Finland) Mikael Korhonen (Finland) Koponen Ari (Finland) Markus Määttänen
- Rallies: 29
- Championships: 0
- Rally wins: 0
- Podiums: 0
- Stage wins: 0
- Total points: 5
- First rally: 2020 Rally Sweden

Lauri Samuli Joona (born 7 December 1996) is a Finnish rally driver.

== Career ==
Joona made Junior World Rally Championship debut at the 2020 Rally Sweden.

Joona participated the World Rally Championship-3 in 2022, and took the championship ahead of Jan Černý in the Catalunya Rally round.

== Results ==
=== WRC results ===
| Year | Entrant | Car | 1 | 2 | 3 | 4 | 5 | 6 | 7 | 8 | 9 | 10 | 11 | 12 | 13 | 14 | Pos. | Points |
|---|---|---|---|---|---|---|---|---|---|---|---|---|---|---|---|---|---|---|
| 2019 | Team Flying Finn | Ford Fiesta R2T19 | MON | SWE | MEX | FRA | ARG | CHL | POR | ITA | FIN; 21 | GER | TUR | GBR | ESP | AUS; C | NC | 0 |
| 2020 | Team Flying Finn | Ford Fiesta Rally4 | MON | SWE; 36 | MEX | EST | TUR | ITA | MNZ | | | | | | | | NC | 0 |
| 2021 | Team Flying Finn | Ford Fiesta Rally4 | MON | ARC; 31 | CRO; 20 | POR; 44 | ITA | KEN | EST; 24 | BEL; 23 | GRE | | ESP; 29 | MNZ | | | NC | 0 |
| 2021 | Lauri Joona | Škoda Fabia R5 | | | | | | | | | | FIN; 13 | | | | | NC | 0 |
| 2022 | Lauri Joona | Ford Fiesta Rally3 | MON | SWE; 15 | CRO; 17 | POR; 18 | ITA | KEN | EST; 21 | FIN; 16 | BEL | GRE; 47 | NZL | ESP; 30 | JPN | | NC | 0 |
| 2023 | Lauri Joona | Skoda Fabia R5 evo | MON | SWE; 17 | MEX | CRO | POR; 16 | ITA; 12 | KEN | EST | | | | | | | NC | 0 |
| 2023 | Lauri Joona | Škoda Fabia RS Rally2 | | | | | | | | | FIN; 14 | GRE; 14 | CHL | EUR; WD | JPN | | NC | 0 |
| 2024 | Lauri Joona | Škoda Fabia RS Rally2 | MON | SWE; 11 | KEN | CRO; 15 | POR; 10 | ITA; 12 | POL; 15 | LAT | FIN; 7 | GRE; 26 | CHL | EUR | JPN | | 23rd | 5 |
| 2025 | Lauri Joona | Škoda Fabia RS Rally2 | MON | SWE; 12 | KEN | ESP | POR; 49 | ITA; 14 | GRE; 17 | EST; 16 | FIN; 21 | PAR | CHL | EUR | JPN | SAU | 28th | 0 |
| 2026 | Lauri Joona | Škoda Fabia RS Rally2 | MON | SWE; 12 | KEN | CRO | ESP | POR | JPN | GRE | EST; 17 | FIN; 11 | PAR | CHL | ITA | SAU | NC | 0 |

* Season still in progress.

=== WRC-2 results ===
| Year | Entrant | Car | 1 | 2 | 3 | 4 | 5 | 6 | 7 | 8 | 9 | 10 | 11 | 12 | 13 | 14 | Pos. | Points |
|---|---|---|---|---|---|---|---|---|---|---|---|---|---|---|---|---|---|---|
| 2023 | Lauri Joona | Skoda Fabia R5 evo | MON | SWE; 8 | MEX | CRO | POR; 11 | ITA; 8 | KEN | EST | | | | | | | 18th | 21 |
| 2023 | Lauri Joona | Škoda Fabia RS Rally2 | | | | | | | | | FIN; 8 | GRE; 7 | CHL | EUR; WD | JPN | | 18th | 21 |
| 2024 | Lauri Joona | Škoda Fabia RS Rally2 | MON | SWE; 6 | KEN | CRO; 6 | POR; 3 | ITA; 7 | POL; 7 | LAT | FIN; 3 | GRE; 13 | CHL | EUR | JPN | | 6th | 58 |
| 2025 | Lauri Joona | Škoda Fabia RS Rally2 | MON | SWE; 4 | KEN | ESP | POR; 25 | ITA; 6 | GRE; 10 | EST; 6 | FIN; 8 | PAR | CHL | EUR | JPN | SAU | 14th | 33 |
| 2026 | Lauri Joona | Škoda Fabia RS Rally2 | MON | SWE; 3 | KEN | CRO | ESP | POR | JPN | GRE | EST; 7 | FIN; 3 | PAR | CHL | ITA | SAU | 13th | 36 |

* Season still in progress.

=== WRC-3 results ===
| Year | Entrant | Car | 1 | 2 | 3 | 4 | 5 | 6 | 7 | 8 | 9 | 10 | 11 | 12 | 13 | Pos. | Points |
|---|---|---|---|---|---|---|---|---|---|---|---|---|---|---|---|---|---|
| 2021 | Lauri Joona | Škoda Fabia R5 | MON | ARC | CRO | POR | ITA | KEN | EST | BEL | GRE | FIN; 3 | ESP | MNZ | | 22nd | 17 |
| 2022 | Lauri Joona | Ford Fiesta Rally3 | MON | SWE; 1 | CRO | POR; 2 | ITA | KEN | EST; 2 | FIN; 1 | BEL | GRE | NZL | ESP; 1 | JPN | 1st | 93 |

=== JWRC results ===
| Year | Entrant | Car | 1 | 2 | 3 | 4 | 5 | Pos. | Points |
|---|---|---|---|---|---|---|---|---|---|
| 2020 | Team Flying Finn | Ford Fiesta Rally4 | SWE; 9 | EST | ITA | MNZ | | 12th | 2 |
| 2021 | Team Flying Finn | Ford Fiesta Rally4 | CRO; 3 | POR; 6 | EST; 4 | BEL; 4 | ESP; 2 | 4th | 88 |
