= Jeremy Wahome =

Kenyan racing driver (born 1998)

Jeremiah Wahome
- Nationality: Kenyan
- Born: 14 December 1998 (age 27) Nairobi, Kenya
- Relatives: Maxine Wahome (sister)

BRDC British Formula 3 Championship
- Years active: 2016–2017
- Teams: Chris Dittmann Racing
- Starts: 44
- Wins: 0
- Poles: 0
- Fastest laps: 0
- Best finish: 14th in 2017

Previous series
- 2015 2018: Formula BMW Asia Cup; F3 Asian Championship

Jeremiah Wahome (born 14 December 1998 in Nairobi) is a racing driver from Kenya. He has competed in various open-wheel formulae, including the BRDC British Formula 3 Championship and F3 Asian Championship.

== Racing record ==
=== Career summary ===
Season	Series	Team	Races	Wins	Poles	W/Laps	Podiums	Points	Position
2015	Formula BMW Asia Cup	Meritus Grand Prix	?	?	?	?	?	?	?
2016	BRDC British Formula 3 Championship	Chris Dittmann Racing	22	0	0	0	0	98	21st
2017	BRDC British Formula 3 Championship	Chris Dittmann Racing	21	0	0	0	0	165	14th
2018	F3 Asian Championship	SVC Asia	12	0	0	0	0	32	12th
2022	World Rally Championship-3	Jeremy Wahome	1	0	N/A	N/A	1	18	10th
2023	World Rally Championship-3	Jeremiah Wahome							

=== Complete F3 Asian Championship results ===
(key) (Races in bold indicate pole position) (Races in italics indicate fastest lap)

Year	Entrant	1	2	3	4	5	6	7	8	9	10	11	12	13	14	15	Pos	Points
2018	SVC Asia	SEP1; 1; 8	SEP1; 2; 6	SEP1; 3; 9	NIS1; 1	NIS1; 2	NIS1; 3	SIC; 1; 8	SIC; 2 Ret	SIC; 3; 11	NIS2; 1; 7	NIS2; 2; 10	NIS2; 3; 10	SEP2; 1; 8	SEP2; 2; 9	SEP2; 3 Ret	12th	32

=== Complete World Rally Championship results ===
Year	Entrant	Car	1	2	3	4	5	6	7	8	9	10	11	12	13	Pos.	Points
2021	Jeremiah Wahome	Ford Fiesta R3	MCO	ARC	CRO	POR	ITA	KEN; 16	EST	BEL	GRE	FIN	ESP	MNZ		NC	0
2022	Jeremy Wahome	Ford Fiesta Rally3	MCO	SWE	CRO	POR	ITA	KEN; 21	EST	FIN	BEL	GRE	NZL	ESP	JPN	NC	0
2023	Jeremiah Wahome	Ford Fiesta Rally3	MCO	SWE	MEX	CRO	POR	ITA	KEN; Ret	EST	FIN	GRE	CHL	EUR	JPN	NC	0
