= Maxine Wahome =

Kenyan racing driver (born 1997)

- Nationality: Kenyan
- Born: 21 December 1997 (age 28) Kenya

Maxine Wahome (born 21 December 1997) is a Kenyan motocross rider and racing driver.

== Career ==
Maxine, daughter of retired Kenyan rally driver Jimmy Wahome and sister of rally driver Jeremy Wahome, she started out as a motocross participant at an early age before scaling up to autocross and rally.

In March 2022, Wahome won the inaugural Lioness Rally in Kasarani

In June 2022, Wahome made her maiden appearance in the Safari Rally held in Naivasha and went on to win the WRC3 class. She was navigated by co-driver Waigwa Murage.

== Personal life ==
In December 2022, Wahome was charged with assault and later murder following an altercation with her boyfriend, fellow rally driver Asad Khan, left him with leg injuries that ultimately proved fatal. Wahome was released on bail, but was dropped from the Safari Rally's Young Rally Stars Programme as a result of the upgraded charge. Wahome's defence claimed that Khan was abusive towards her, other partners and neighbours, and had injured himself in the altercation. Wahome was acquitted of all charges in July 2026.

== Career results ==
=== Complete World Rally Championship results ===
Year	Entrant	Car	1	2	3	4	5	6	7	8	9	10	11	12	13	Pos.	Points
2022	Maxine Wahome	Ford Fiesta Rally3	MON	SWE	CRO	POR	ITA	KEN; 17	EST	FIN	BEL	GRE	NZL	ESP	JPN	NC	0
