= 2024 Safari Rally =

72nd edition of Kenyan automobile rally

2024 Safari Rally Safari Rally Kenya 2024
Round 3 of 13 in the 2024 World Rally Championship
← Previous event	Next event →
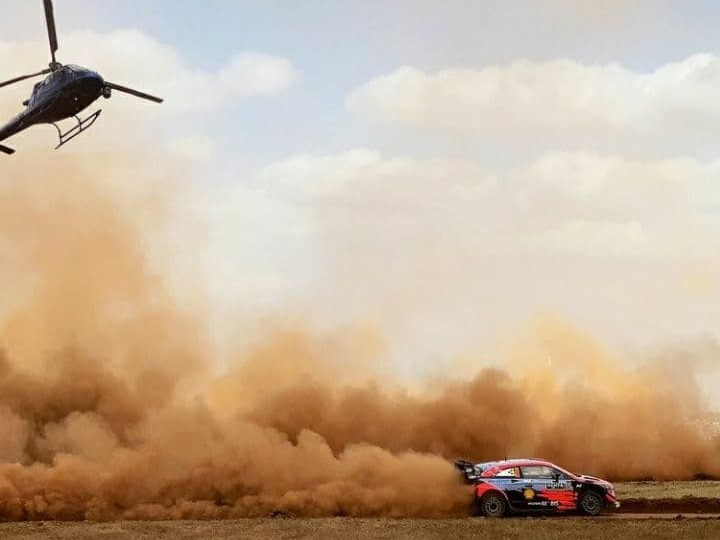
- Safari Rally moved ahead to March for 2024.
- Host country: Kenya
- Rally base: Naivasha, Nakuru County
- Dates run: 28 – 31 March 2024
- Start location: Kasarani, Nairobi
- Finish location: Hell's Gate National Park, Naivasha
- Stages: 19 (355.92 km; 221.16 miles)
- Stage surface: Sand
- Transport distance: 943.30 km (586.14 miles)
- Overall distance: 1,299.22 km (807.30 miles)

Statistics
- Crews registered: 29
- Crews: 28 at start, 22 at finish

Overall results
- Overall winner: (Finland) Kalle Rovanperä (Finland) Jonne Halttunen (Japan) Toyota Gazoo Racing WRT; 3:36:04.0
- Saturday Overall leader: (Finland) Kalle Rovanperä (Finland) Jonne Halttunen (Japan) Toyota Gazoo Racing WRT; 2:48:50.2
- Sunday Accumulated leader: (Estonia) Ott Tänak (Estonia) Martin Järveoja (South Korea) Hyundai Shell Mobis WRT; 45:27.7
- Power Stage winner: (Belgium) Thierry Neuville (Belgium) Martijn Wydaeghe (South Korea) Hyundai Shell Mobis WRT; 5:27.1

Support category results
- WRC-2 winner: (Sweden) Gus Greensmith (Sweden) Jonas Andersson (Germany) Toksport WRT; 3:54:09.4
- WRC-3 winner: (Kenya) Hamza Anwar (Kenya) Adnan Din; 6:16:11.8

The 2024 Safari Rally (also known as the 2024 Safari Rally Kenya) was a motor racing event for rally cars held over four days from 28 to 31 March 2024. It marked the seventy-second running of the Safari Rally, and was the third round of the 2024 World Rally Championship, World Rally Championship-2 and World Rally Championship-3. The event was based in Naivasha in the Nakuru County, and was contested over nineteen special stages, covering a total competitive distance of 355.92 km (221.16 mi).

Sébastien Ogier and Vincent Landais were the defending rally winners, and Toyota Gazoo Racing WRT, were the defending manufacturer's winners. Kajetan Kajetanowicz and Maciej Szczepaniak were the defending rally winners in the WRC-2 category. Diego Dominguez Jr. and Rogelio Peñate were the defending rally winners in the WRC-3 category.

Kalle Rovanperä and Jonne Halttunen won the rally, and their team, Toyota Gazoo Racing WRT, successfully defended their titles. Gus Greensmith and Jonas Andersson were the winners in the WRC-2 category. Hamza Anwar and Adnan Din were the winners in the WRC-3 category.

== Background ==
=== Entry list ===
The following crews entered into the rally. The event was opened to crews competing in the World Rally Championship, its support categories, the World Rally Championship-2, World Rally Championship-3 and privateer entries that were not registered to score points in any championship. Nine entered under Rally1 regulations, as were thirteen Rally2 crews in the World Rally Championship-2 and one Rally3 crew in the World Rally Championship-3.

Rally1 entries competing in the World Rally Championship
No.	Driver	Co-Driver	Entrant	Car	Championship eligibility	Tyre
4	(Finland) Esapekka Lappi	(Finland) Janne Ferm	(South Korea) Hyundai Shell Mobis WRT	Hyundai i20 N Rally1	Driver, Co-driver, Manufacturer	P
8	(Estonia) Ott Tänak	(Estonia) Martin Järveoja	(South Korea) Hyundai Shell Mobis WRT	Hyundai i20 N Rally1	Driver, Co-driver, Manufacturer	P
11	(Belgium) Thierry Neuville	(Belgium) Martijn Wydaeghe	(South Korea) Hyundai Shell Mobis WRT	Hyundai i20 N Rally1	Driver, Co-driver, Manufacturer	P
13	(Luxembourg) Grégoire Munster	(Belgium) Louis Louka	(United Kingdom) M-Sport Ford WRT	Ford Puma Rally1	Driver, Co-driver, Manufacturer	P
16	(France) Adrien Fourmaux	(France) Alexandre Coria	(United Kingdom) M-Sport Ford WRT	Ford Puma Rally1	Driver, Co-driver, Manufacturer	P
18	(Japan) Takamoto Katsuta	(Republic of Ireland) Aaron Johnston	(Japan) Toyota Gazoo Racing WRT	Toyota GR Yaris Rally1	Driver, Co-driver, Manufacturer	P
19	(Greece) Jourdan Serderidis	(Belgium) Frédéric Miclotte	(United Kingdom) M-Sport Ford WRT	Ford Puma Rally1	Driver, Co-driver	P
33	(United Kingdom) Elfyn Evans	(United Kingdom) Scott Martin	(Japan) Toyota Gazoo Racing WRT	Toyota GR Yaris Rally1	Driver, Co-driver, Manufacturer	P
69	(Finland) Kalle Rovanperä	(Finland) Jonne Halttunen	(Japan) Toyota Gazoo Racing WRT	Toyota GR Yaris Rally1	Driver, Co-driver, Manufacturer	P

Rally2 entries competing in the World Rally Championship-2
No.	Driver	Co-Driver	Entrant	Car	Championship eligibility	Tyre
20	(Sweden) Oliver Solberg	(United Kingdom) Elliott Edmondson	(Germany) Toksport WRT	Škoda Fabia RS Rally2	Driver, Co-driver, Team	P
21	(France) Nicolas Ciamin	(France) Yannick Roche	(France) Nicolas Ciamin	Hyundai i20 N Rally2	Challenger Driver, Challenger Co-driver	P
22	(United Kingdom) Gus Greensmith	(Sweden) Jonas Andersson	(Germany) Toksport WRT	Škoda Fabia RS Rally2	Driver, Co-driver, Team	P
23	(Poland) Kajetan Kajetanowicz	(Poland) Maciej Szczepaniak	(Poland) Kajetan Kajetanowicz	Škoda Fabia RS Rally2	Challenger Driver, Challenger Co-driver	P
24	(Kenya) Carl Tundo	(Kenya) Tim Jessop	(Kenya) Carl Tundo	Ford Fiesta R5	Challenger/Master Driver, Challenger Co-driver	P
25	(Luxembourg) Charles Munster	(Belgium) Loïc Dumont	(Luxembourg) Charles Munster	Hyundai i20 N Rally2	Challenger Driver, Challenger Co-driver	P
26	(Paraguay) Diego Dominguez Jr.	(Spain) Rogelio Peñate	(Paraguay) Diego Dominguez Jr.	Citroën C3 Rally2	Challenger Driver, Challenger Co-driver	P
27	(Poland) Daniel Chwist	(Poland) Kamil Heller	(Poland) Daniel Chwist	Škoda Fabia RS Rally2	Challenger Driver, Challenger Co-driver	P
28	(Kenya) Karan Patel	(Kenya) Tauseef Khan	(Kenya) Karan Patel	Škoda Fabia R5	Challenger Driver, Challenger Co-driver	P
29	(Kenya) Samman Singh Vohra	(Kenya) Alfir Khan	(Kenya) Samman Singh Vohra	Škoda Fabia Rally2 evo	Challenger Driver, Challenger Co-driver	P
30	(Kenya) Aakif Virani	(Kenya) Zahir Shah	(Kenya) Aakif Virani	Škoda Fabia R5	Challenger/Masters Driver, Challenger Co-driver	P
31	(Spain) Miguel Díaz-Aboitiz	(Spain) Rodrigo Sanjuan de Eusebio	(Spain) Miguel Díaz-Aboitiz	Škoda Fabia Rally2 evo	Challenger/Masters Driver, Challenger Co-driver	P
32	(Greece) George Vassilakis	(United Kingdom) Tom Krawszik	(Greece) George Vassilakis	Ford Fiesta Rally2	Challenger/Masters Driver, Challenger Co-driver, Team	P

Rally3 entries competing in the World Rally Championship-3
No.	Driver	Co-Driver	Entrant	Car	Tyre
34	(Kenya) Hamza Anwar	(Kenya) Adnan Din	(Kenya) Hamza Anwar	Ford Fiesta Rally3	P

=== Itinerary ===
All dates and times are EAT (UTC+3).

Date	No.	Time span	Stage name	Distance
27 March	—	After 10:01	Loldia [Shakedown]	5.40 km
28 March		After 12:26	Opening ceremony, Kenyatta International Convention Centre	—N/a
28 March	SS1	After 14:05	Super Special Kasarani	4.84 km
29 March		7:30 – 7:45	Service A, WSTI Naivasha	—N/a
29 March	SS2	After 8:30	Loldia 1	19.17 km
29 March	SS3	After 9:48	Geothermal 1	13.12 km
29 March	SS4	After 10:41	Kedong 1	30.62 km
29 March		12:31 – 13:11	Service B, WSTI Naivasha	—N/a
29 March	SS5	After 13:56	Loldia 2	19.17 km
29 March	SS6	After 15:14	Geothermal 2	13.12 km
29 March	SS7	After 16:07	Kedong 2	30.62 km
29 March		17:37 – 18:22	Flexi Service C, WSTI Naivasha	—N/a
30 March	SS8	After 8:01	Soysambu 1	29.32 km
30 March	SS9	After 9:05	Elmenteita 1	15.08 km
30 March	SS10	After 10:03	Sleeping Warrior 1	31.04 km
30 March		12:28 – 13:08	Service D, WSTI Naivasha	—N/a
30 March	SS11	After 14:34	Soysambu 2	29.32 km
30 March	SS12	After 15:35	Elmenteita 2	15.08 km
30 March	SS13	After 16:33	Sleeping Warrior 2	31.04 km
30 March		18:53 – 19:38	Flexi Service E, WSTI Naivasha	—N/a
31 March	SS14	After 7:02	Malewa 1	8.33 km
31 March	SS15	After 7:57	Oserian 1	18.33 km
31 March	SS16	After 9:05	Hell's Gate 1	10.53 km
31 March		10:18 – 10:33	Service F, WSTI Naivasha	—N/a
31 March	SS17	After 11:20	Malewa 2	8.33 km
31 March	SS18	After 12:10	Oserian 2	18.33 km
31 March		13:18 – 13:58	Regroup, WSTI Naivasha	—N/a
31 March	SS19	After 14:15	Hell's Gate 2 [Power Stage]	10.53 km
31 March		After 15:15	Podium ceremony, WSTI Naivasha	—N/a

== Report ==
=== WRC Rally1 ===
==== Classification ====
Position		No.	Driver	Co-driver	Entrant	Car	Time	Difference	Points			
Class	Event	No.	Driver	Co-driver	Entrant	Car	Time	Difference	SAT	SUN	WPS	Total
1	1	69	Kalle Rovanperä	Jonne Halttunen	Toyota Gazoo Racing WRT	Toyota GR Yaris Rally1	3:36:04.0	0.0	18	0	2	20
2	2	18	Takamoto Katsuta	Aaron Johnston	Toyota Gazoo Racing WRT	Toyota GR Yaris Rally1	3:37:41.8	+1:37.8	15	3	0	18
3	3	16	Adrien Fourmaux	Alexandre Coria	M-Sport Ford WRT	Ford Puma Rally1	3:38:29.1	+2:25.1	13	4	0	17
4	4	33	Elfyn Evans	Scott Martin	Toyota Gazoo Racing WRT	Toyota GR Yaris Rally1	3:40:24.2	+4:20.2	10	5	1	16
5	5	11	Thierry Neuville	Martijn Wydaeghe	Hyundai Shell Mobis WRT	Hyundai i20 N Rally1	3:46:21.5	+10:17.5	8	6	5	19
6	8	8	Ott Tänak	Martin Järveoja	Hyundai Shell Mobis WRT	Hyundai i20 N Rally1	3:57:06.0	+21:02.0	1	7	4	12
7	9	19	Jourdan Serderidis	Frédéric Miclotte	M-Sport Ford WRT	Ford Puma Rally1	4:02:17.3	+26:13.3	2	0	0	2
8	12	4	Esapekka Lappi	Janne Ferm	Hyundai Shell Mobis WRT	Hyundai i20 N Rally1	4:18:25.7	+42:21.7	0	1	3	4
9	15	13	Grégoire Munster	Louis Louka	M-Sport Ford WRT	Ford Puma Rally1	4:33:59.9	+57:55.9	0	2	0	2

==== Special stages ====
Stage	Winners	Car	Time	Class leaders
SD	Rovanperä / Halttunen	Toyota GR Yaris Rally1	3:32.1	—N/a
SS1	Neuville / Wydaeghe	Hyundai i20 N Rally1	3:19.9	Neuville / Wydaeghe
SS2	Rovanperä / Halttunen	Toyota GR Yaris Rally1	13:59.0	Rovanperä / Halttunen
SS3	Rovanperä / Halttunen	Toyota GR Yaris Rally1	6:51.3	Rovanperä / Halttunen
SS4	Rovanperä / Halttunen	Toyota GR Yaris Rally1	15:42.1	Rovanperä / Halttunen
SS5	Rovanperä / Halttunen	Toyota GR Yaris Rally1	13:56.7	Rovanperä / Halttunen
SS6	Rovanperä / Halttunen	Toyota GR Yaris Rally1	6:48.6	Rovanperä / Halttunen
SS7	Rovanperä / Halttunen	Toyota GR Yaris Rally1	15:44.2	Rovanperä / Halttunen
SS8	Katsuta / Johnston	Toyota GR Yaris Rally1	17:12.5	Rovanperä / Halttunen
SS9	Neuville / Wydaeghe	Hyundai i20 N Rally1	8:15.8	Rovanperä / Halttunen
SS10	Rovanperä / Halttunen	Toyota GR Yaris Rally1	20:23.8	Rovanperä / Halttunen
SS11	Katsuta / Johnston	Toyota GR Yaris Rally1	17:19.4	Rovanperä / Halttunen
SS12	Evans / Martin	Toyota GR Yaris Rally1	8:24.7	Rovanperä / Halttunen
SS13	Tänak / Järveoja	Hyundai i20 N Rally1	20:09.0	Rovanperä / Halttunen
SS14	Neuville / Wydaeghe	Hyundai i20 N Rally1	5:57.3	Rovanperä / Halttunen
SS15	Evans / Martin	Toyota GR Yaris Rally1	11:27.5	Rovanperä / Halttunen
SS16	Evans / Martin	Toyota GR Yaris Rally1	5:29.3	Rovanperä / Halttunen
SS17	Neuville / Wydaeghe	Hyundai i20 N Rally1	5:59.0	Rovanperä / Halttunen
SS18	Tänak / Järveoja	Hyundai i20 N Rally1	10:55.4	Rovanperä / Halttunen
SS19	Neuville / Wydaeghe	Hyundai i20 N Rally1	5:27.1	Rovanperä / Halttunen

==== Championship standings ====
Pos.	Drivers' championships			Co-drivers' championships			Manufacturers' championships		
Pos.	Move	Driver	Points	Move	Co-driver	Points	Move	Manufacturer	Points
1		Thierry Neuville	67		Martijn Wydaeghe	67	1	Toyota Gazoo Racing WRT	131
2		Elfyn Evans	61		Scott Martin	61	1	Hyundai Shell Mobis WRT	127
3		Adrien Fourmaux	46		Alexandre Coria	46		M-Sport Ford WRT	72
4	1	Ott Tänak	33	1	Martin Järveoja	33			
5	3	Kalle Rovanperä	31	3	Jonne Halttunen	31			

=== WRC-2 Rally2 ===
==== Classification ====
Position		No.	Driver	Co-driver	Entrant	Car	Time	Difference	Points	
Event	Class	No.	Driver	Co-driver	Entrant	Car	Time	Difference	Class	Event
6	1	22	Gus Greensmith	Jonas Andersson	Toksport WRT	Škoda Fabia RS Rally2	3:54:09.4	0.0	25	6
7	2	20	Oliver Solberg	Elliott Edmondson	Toksport WRT	Škoda Fabia RS Rally2	3:55:32.5	+1:23.1	18	4
10	3	23	Kajetan Kajetanowicz	Maciej Szczepaniak	Kajetan Kajetanowicz	Škoda Fabia RS Rally2	4:02:38.4	+8:29.0	15	3
11	4	21	Nicolas Ciamin	Yannick Roche	Nicolas Ciamin	Hyundai i20 N Rally2	4:07:49.3	+13:39.9	12	0
13	5	25	Charles Munster	Loïc Dumont	Charles Munster	Hyundai i20 N Rally2	4:21:49.0	+27:39.6	10	0
14	6	27	Daniel Chwist	Kamil Heller	Daniel Chwist	Škoda Fabia RS Rally2	4:26:11.0	+32:01.6	8	0
16	7	24	Carl Tundo	Tim Jessop	Carl Tundo	Ford Fiesta R5	4:41:09.6	+47:00.2	6	0
17	8	32	George Vassilakis	Tom Krawszik	George Vassilakis	Ford Fiesta Rally2	4:46:02.4	+51:53.0	4	0
18	9	28	Karan Patel	Tauseef Khan	Karan Patel	Škoda Fabia R5	5:09:33.1	+1:15:23.7	2	0
19	10	30	Aakif Virani	Azhar Bhatti	Aakif Virani	Škoda Fabia R5	5:29:01.9	+1:34:52.5	1	0
Retired SS15		31	Miguel Díaz-Aboitiz	Rodrigo Sanjuan de Eusebio	Miguel Díaz-Aboitiz	Škoda Fabia Rally2 evo	Withdrawn		0	0
Retired SS10		26	Diego Dominguez Jr.	Rogelio Peñate	Diego Dominguez Jr.	Citroën C3 Rally2	Withdrawn		0	0
Retired SS1		29	Samman Singh Vohra	Alfir Khan	Samman Singh Vohra	Škoda Fabia Rally2 evo	Accident damage		0	0

==== Special stages ====
Overall
Stage	Winners	Car	Time	Class leaders
SD	Greensmith / Andersson	Škoda Fabia RS Rally2	3:45.6	—N/a
SS1	Greensmith / Andersson	Škoda Fabia RS Rally2	3:26.5	Greensmith / Andersson
SS2	Greensmith / Andersson	Škoda Fabia RS Rally2	14:45.9	Greensmith / Andersson
SS3	Greensmith / Andersson	Škoda Fabia RS Rally2	7:29.5	Greensmith / Andersson
SS4	Greensmith / Andersson	Škoda Fabia RS Rally2	17:37.7	Greensmith / Andersson
SS5	Solberg / Edmondson	Škoda Fabia RS Rally2	14:45.2	Greensmith / Andersson
SS6	Greensmith / Andersson	Škoda Fabia RS Rally2	7:21.5	Greensmith / Andersson
SS7	Solberg / Edmondson	Škoda Fabia RS Rally2	17:31.3	Greensmith / Andersson
SS8	Solberg / Edmondson	Škoda Fabia RS Rally2	18:34.3	Greensmith / Andersson
SS9	Greensmith / Andersson	Škoda Fabia RS Rally2	9:03.4	Greensmith / Andersson
SS10	Solberg / Edmondson	Škoda Fabia RS Rally2	22:04.0	Greensmith / Andersson
SS11	Solberg / Edmondson	Škoda Fabia RS Rally2	18:26.0	Greensmith / Andersson
SS12	Greensmith / Andersson	Škoda Fabia RS Rally2	9:05.2	Greensmith / Andersson
SS13	Solberg / Edmondson	Škoda Fabia RS Rally2	21:39.1	Greensmith / Andersson
SS14	Greensmith / Andersson	Škoda Fabia RS Rally2	6:37.3	Greensmith / Andersson
SS15	Solberg / Edmondson	Škoda Fabia RS Rally2	12:14.1	Greensmith / Andersson
SS16	Solberg / Edmondson	Škoda Fabia RS Rally2	6:04.2	Greensmith / Andersson
SS17	Solberg / Edmondson	Škoda Fabia RS Rally2	6:43.1	Greensmith / Andersson
SS18	Solberg / Edmondson	Škoda Fabia RS Rally2	12:02.8	Greensmith / Andersson
SS19	Solberg / Edmondson	Škoda Fabia RS Rally2	5:57.3	Greensmith / Andersson

Challenger
Stage	Winners	Car	Time	Class leaders
SD	Kajetanowicz / Szczepaniak	Škoda Fabia RS Rally2	3:49.8	—N/a
SS1	Kajetanowicz / Szczepaniak	Škoda Fabia RS Rally2	3:29.6	Kajetanowicz / Szczepaniak
SS2	Kajetanowicz / Szczepaniak	Škoda Fabia RS Rally2	15:13.7	Kajetanowicz / Szczepaniak
SS3	Kajetanowicz / Szczepaniak	Škoda Fabia RS Rally2	7:39.6	Kajetanowicz / Szczepaniak
SS4	Munster / Dumont	Hyundai i20 N Rally2	18:37.0	Ciamin / Roche
SS5	Kajetanowicz / Szczepaniak	Škoda Fabia RS Rally2	15:00.3	Kajetanowicz / Szczepaniak
SS6	Ciamin / Roche	Hyundai i20 N Rally2	7:37.9	Kajetanowicz / Szczepaniak
SS7	Kajetanowicz / Szczepaniak	Škoda Fabia RS Rally2	18:03.2	Kajetanowicz / Szczepaniak
SS8	Dominguez Jr. / Peñate	Citroën C3 Rally2	19:28.4	Kajetanowicz / Szczepaniak
SS9	Kajetanowicz / Szczepaniak	Škoda Fabia RS Rally2	9:19.9	Kajetanowicz / Szczepaniak
SS10	Kajetanowicz / Szczepaniak	Škoda Fabia RS Rally2	23:23.2	Kajetanowicz / Szczepaniak
SS11	Kajetanowicz / Szczepaniak	Škoda Fabia RS Rally2	19:08.4	Kajetanowicz / Szczepaniak
SS12	Kajetanowicz / Szczepaniak	Škoda Fabia RS Rally2	9:25.3	Kajetanowicz / Szczepaniak
SS13	Kajetanowicz / Szczepaniak	Škoda Fabia RS Rally2	22:42.2	Kajetanowicz / Szczepaniak
SS14	Kajetanowicz / Szczepaniak	Škoda Fabia RS Rally2	6:55.8	Kajetanowicz / Szczepaniak
SS15	Ciamin / Roche	Hyundai i20 N Rally2	12:37.4	Kajetanowicz / Szczepaniak
SS16	Ciamin / Roche	Hyundai i20 N Rally2	6:23.1	Kajetanowicz / Szczepaniak
SS17	Munster / Dumont	Hyundai i20 N Rally2	7:01.7	Kajetanowicz / Szczepaniak
SS18	Ciamin / Roche	Hyundai i20 N Rally2	12:28.0	Kajetanowicz / Szczepaniak
SS19	Kajetanowicz / Szczepaniak	Škoda Fabia RS Rally2	6:10.6	Kajetanowicz / Szczepaniak

==== Championship standings ====
Pos.	Open Drivers' championships			Open Co-drivers' championships			Teams' championships			Challenger Drivers' championships			Challenger Co-drivers' championships		
Pos.	Move	Driver	Points	Move	Co-driver	Points	Move	Manufacturer	Points	Move	Manufacturer	Points	Move	Driver	Points
1	1	Oliver Solberg	43	1	Elliott Edmondson	43		DG Sport Compétition	43	2	Nicolas Ciamin	33	2	Yannick Roche	33
2	1	Yohan Rossel	25	1	Arnaud Dunand	25		Toyota Gazoo Racing WRT NG	43	1	Pepe López	25	1	David Vázquez Liste	25
3	New entry	Gus Greensmith	25	New entry	Jonas Andersson	25	New entry	Toksport WRT	43	1	Sami Pajari	25	1	Enni Mälkönen	25
4	3	Nicolas Ciamin	24	3	Yannick Roche	24				New entry	Kajetan Kajetanowicz	25	New entry	Maciej Szczepaniak	25
5	2	Pepe López	18	2	David Vázquez Liste	18				2	Nikolay Gryazin	18	2	Konstantin Aleksandrov	18

=== WRC-3 Rally3 ===
==== Classification ====
Position		No.	Driver	Co-driver	Entrant	Car	Time	Difference	Points
Event	Class	No.	Driver	Co-driver	Entrant	Car	Time	Difference	Points
22	1	34	Hamza Anwar	Adnan Din	Hamza Anwar	Ford Fiesta Rally3	6:16:11.8	0.0	25

==== Special stages ====
Stage	Winners	Car	Time	Class leaders
SD	Anwar / Din	Ford Fiesta Rally3	5:02.4	—N/a
SS1	Anwar / Din	Ford Fiesta Rally3	3:49.0	Anwar / Din
SS2	Anwar / Din	Ford Fiesta Rally3	23:46.7	Anwar / Din
SS3	Anwar / Din	Ford Fiesta Rally3	18:53.0	Anwar / Din
SS4	Anwar / Din	Ford Fiesta Rally3	30:54.8	Anwar / Din
SS5	Anwar / Din	Ford Fiesta Rally3	26:58.2	Anwar / Din
SS6	Anwar / Din	Ford Fiesta Rally3	19:00.5	Anwar / Din
SS7	Anwar / Din	Ford Fiesta Rally3	31:04.5	Anwar / Din
SS8	Anwar / Din	Ford Fiesta Rally3	22:29.3	Anwar / Din
SS9	Anwar / Din	Ford Fiesta Rally3	11:02.9	Anwar / Din
SS10	Anwar / Din	Ford Fiesta Rally3	27:08.0	Anwar / Din
SS11	Anwar / Din	Ford Fiesta Rally3	31:14.2	Anwar / Din
SS12	Anwar / Din	Ford Fiesta Rally3	20:26.9	Anwar / Din
SS13	Anwar / Din	Ford Fiesta Rally3	38:19.8	Anwar / Din
SS14	Anwar / Din	Ford Fiesta Rally3	8:08.4	Anwar / Din
SS15	Anwar / Din	Ford Fiesta Rally3	14:32.1	Anwar / Din
SS16	Anwar / Din	Ford Fiesta Rally3	7:27.0	Anwar / Din
SS17	Anwar / Din	Ford Fiesta Rally3	8:08.7	Anwar / Din
SS18	Anwar / Din	Ford Fiesta Rally3	15:15.8	Anwar / Din
SS19	Anwar / Din	Ford Fiesta Rally3	7:32.0	Anwar / Din

==== Championship standings ====
Pos.	Drivers' championships			Co-drivers' championships		
Pos.	Move	Driver	Points	Move	Co-driver	Points
1		Jan Černý	25		Ondřej Krajča	25
2		Mille Johansson	25		Johan Grönvall	25
3	New entry	Hamza Anwar	25	New entry	Adnan Din	25
4	1	Ghjuvanni Rossi	18	1	Kylian Sarmezan	18
5	1	Romet Jürgenson	18	1	Siim Oja	18

Previous rally: 2024 Rally Sweden	2024 FIA World Rally Championship	Next rally: 2024 Croatia Rally
Previous rally: 2023 Safari Rally	2024 Safari Rally	Next rally: 2025 Safari Rally
