= 2024 WRC2 Championship =

Motorsport championship

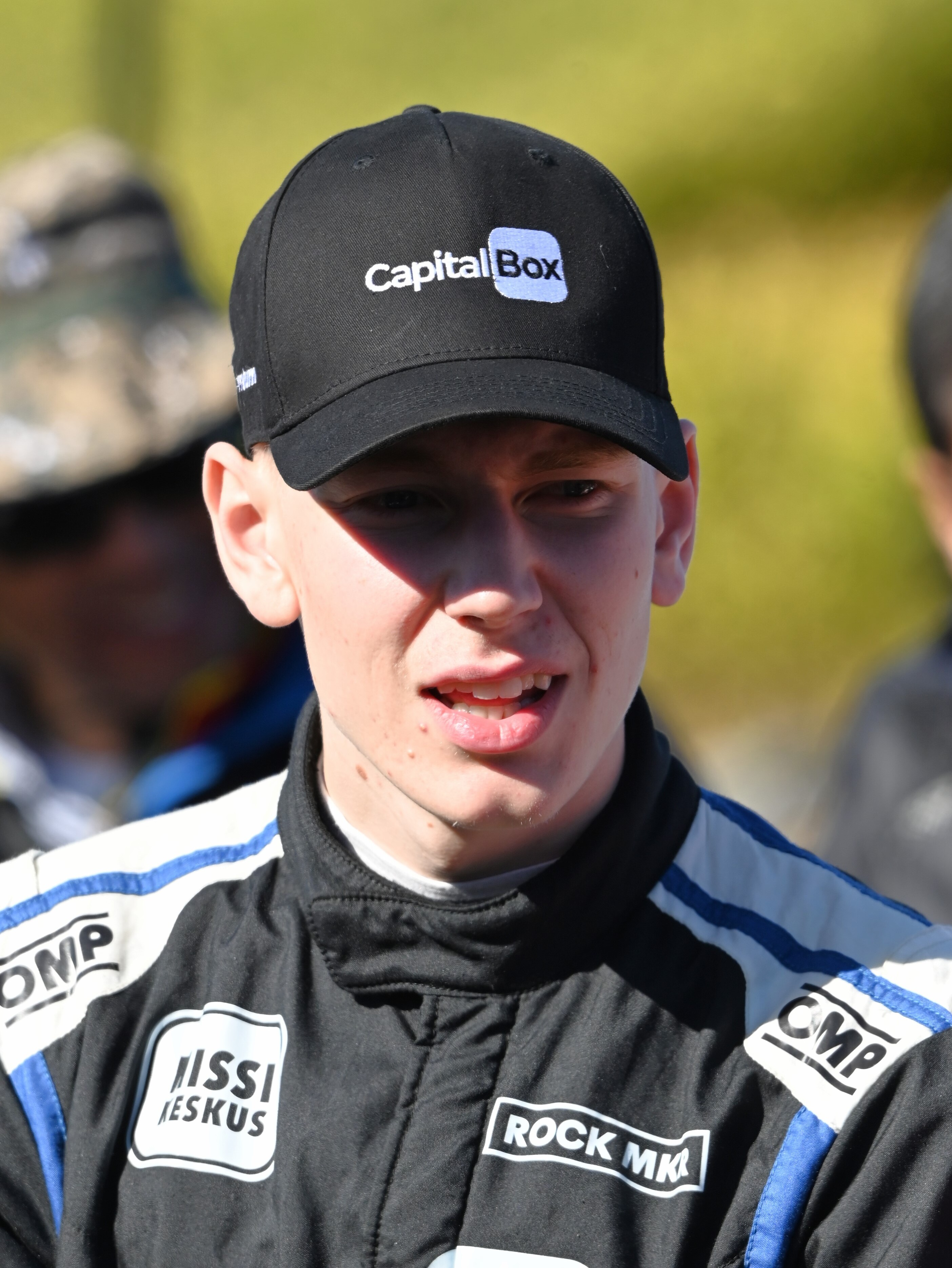
Sami Pajari won the 2024 WRC2 drivers' championship.

The 2024 FIA WRC2 Championship was the twelfth season of WRC2, a rallying championship organised and governed by the Fédération Internationale de l'Automobile as the second-highest tier of international rallying. The category was opened to crews with cars complying with Group Rally2 regulations. The championship began in January 2024 with the Monte Carlo Rally and concluded in November 2024 with the Rally Japan, and ran in support of the 2024 World Rally Championship.

Andreas Mikkelsen and Torstein Eriksen were the defending drivers' and co-drivers' champions. Sami Pajari and Enni Mälkönen became the 2024 WRC2 champions.

== Calendar ==
A map showing the locations of the rallies in the 2024 championship. Event headquarters are marked with black dots.

The 2024 season was contested over thirteen rounds across Europe, Africa, South America and Asia.

Round	Start date	Finish date	Rally	Rally headquarters	Surface	Stages	Distance	Ref.
1	25 January	28 January	(Monaco) Rallye Automobile Monte Carlo	Gap, Provence-Alpes-Côte d'Azur, France	Mixed (Note: The Monte Carlo Rally is run on a tarmac and snow surface.)	17	324.44 km	
2	15 February	18 February	Rally Sweden	Umeå, Västerbotten County, Sweden	Snow	18	300.10 km	
3	28 March	31 March	Safari Rally Kenya	Nairobi, Nakuru County, Kenya	Gravel	19	355.92 km	
4	18 April	21 April	Croatia Rally	Zagreb, Croatia	Tarmac	20	283.28 km	
5	9 May	12 May	Rally de Portugal	Matosinhos, Porto, Portugal	Gravel	22	337.04 km	
6	30 May	2 June	(Italy) Rally Italia Sardegna	Alghero, Sardinia, Italy	Gravel	16	266.12 km	
7	27 June	30 June	Rally Poland	Mikołajki, Warmian–Masurian, Poland	Gravel	19	304.10 km	
8	18 July	21 July	Rally Latvia	Liepāja, Kurzeme Planning Region, Latvia	Gravel	20	300.13 km	
9	1 August	4 August	Rally Finland	Jyväskylä, Central Finland, Finland	Gravel	20	305.69 km	
10	5 September	8 September	Acropolis Rally Greece	Lamia, Central Greece, Greece	Gravel	15	305.30 km	
11	26 September	29 September	Rally Chile	Concepción, Biobío, Chile	Gravel	16	306.76 km	
12	17 October	20 October	(Europe) Central European Rally	Bad Griesbach, Bavaria, Germany	Tarmac	18	302.51 km	
13	21 November	24 November	Rally Japan	Toyota, Aichi, Japan	Tarmac	21	302.59 km	

=== Calendar changes ===
The championship was expected to be expanded to 14 rounds, however WRC Promoter GmbH retained the existing total of 13 events with the reasoning that it would aid participation of more Rally1 cars.

- Rally Liepāja stepped up from the European Rally Championship to hold a World Rally Championship event under a new name, Rally Latvia. The rally was held on gravel roads that ranged from the cities of Rīga and Liepāja to the regions of Talsi, Tukums, Kuldīga and Dienvidkurzeme.
- Rally Poland returned to the championship. This marked the first time the event was held as a WRC event since 2017.
- Rally Estonia was replaced by Rally Latvia on the calendar in 2024, but the event returned in 2025.
- Rally Mexico dropped off the calendar.

The WRC Promoter GmbH was also working on the two key calendar expansions for the future.

- Progress had been made for the candidate event in the United States, a location that was also aiming to join the championship in 2024.
- The other key expansion was Rally China, which was last featured in 1999. The rally was also scheduled to be held in 2016, but it was ultimately cancelled due to the damage caused by the 2016 China floods.

In addition, the candidate list also included the event in Saudi Arabia, where it aimed at a 2025 calendar slot. The rally was a part of WRC Promoter GmbH's plan to deliver a desert event. Rally Argentina was also bidding to return to the championship.

=== Other changes ===
- The organizers of the Monte Carlo Rally relocated its headquarters back to Gap in France. The rally was previously based in Monaco.
- The Kenyan Rally, which took place in June in the previous three seasons, moved ahead to March at the weekend of Easter as the third round of the season.
- The running date of the Central European Rally was moved two weeks earlier with a headquarter change to avoid the clash with All Saints' Day.

== Entries ==
The following teams and crews are under contract to contest WRC2 in 2024. Teams must enter two crews to be eligible for Teams' Championship points.

Crews entered by or via teams
Entrant	Car	Driver		Co-Driver		Rounds
Entrant	Car	Driver name	Category	Co-Driver Name	Category	Rounds
(Czech Republic) ACCR Toyota Dolák	Toyota GR Yaris Rally2	(Czech Republic) Filip Mareš	Challenger	(Czech Republic) Radovan Bucha	Challenger	12
(Belgium) AEC – DG Sport Competition	Citroën C3 Rally2	(Bulgaria) Nikolay Gryazin	Challenger	Konstantin Aleksandrov (Note: Konstantin Aleksandrov is a Russian national, but competes as an Authorised Neutral Athlete in accordance with recommendations made by the International Olympic Committee, following a decision by the FIA to ban all connections with Russia following the Russian invasion of Ukraine.)	Challenger	1, 4, 7, 10–13
(Belgium) AEC – DG Sport Competition	Citroën C3 Rally2	(France) Yohan Rossel		(France) Arnaud Dunand		1, 4–5
(Belgium) AEC – DG Sport Competition	Citroën C3 Rally2	(France) Yohan Rossel		(France) Benjamin Boulloud		6
(Belgium) AEC – DG Sport Competition	Citroën C3 Rally2	(France) Yohan Rossel		(France) Florian Barral		10–12
Ahead Japan Racing Team	Škoda Fabia R5	(Japan) Hiroki Arai	Challenger	(Japan) Shunsuke Matsuo	Challenger	13
(Lebanon) HW34 by Motortune	Škoda Fabia RS Rally2	(Oman) Hamed Al-Wahaibi	Challenger	(Austria) Ilka Minor	Challenger	9
(Lebanon) HW34 by Motortune	Škoda Fabia RS Rally2	(Oman) Hamed Al-Wahaibi	Challenger	(Republic of Ireland) Niall Burns	Challenger	10
(Republic of Ireland) Motorsport Ireland Rally Academy	Ford Fiesta Rally2	(Republic of Ireland) William Creighton	Challenger	(Republic of Ireland) Liam Regan	Challenger	2, 4–6, 8–9, 12
(Spain) Past Racing	Ford Fiesta Rally2	(Spain) Daniel Alonso Villarón	Challenger	(Spain) Alejandro López	Challenger	5–6
(Finland) Printsport	Škoda Fabia R5	(Finland) Juha Liimatainen	Challenger	(Finland) Timo Hantunen	Challenger	9
(Finland) Printsport	Škoda Fabia RS Rally2	(Saudi Arabia) Rakan Al-Rashed	Challenger	(Portugal) Hugo Magalhães	Challenger	2, 5
(Finland) Printsport	Škoda Fabia RS Rally2	(Poland) Michał Sołowow	Challenger	(Poland) Maciej Baran	Challenger	2, 7
(Finland) Printsport	Toyota GR Yaris Rally2	(Saudi Arabia) Rakan Al-Rashed	Challenger	(Portugal) Hugo Magalhães	Challenger	8
(Finland) Printsport	Toyota GR Yaris Rally2	(Finland) Sami Pajari	Challenger	(Finland) Enni Mälkönen	Challenger	2, 5–8, 10, 13
(Portugal) Sports & You	Citroën C3 Rally2	(Bolivia) Marco Bulacia		(Spain) Vallejo Diego		5
(Germany) Toksport WRT	Škoda Fabia Rally2 evo	(Turkey) Burcu Çetinkaya	Challenger	(Italy) Fabrizia Pons	Challenger	10
(Germany) Toksport WRT	Škoda Fabia RS Rally2	(Norway) Eyvind Brynildsen	Challenger	(Norway) Jørn Listerud	Challenger	4
(Germany) Toksport WRT	Škoda Fabia RS Rally2	(United Kingdom) Gus Greensmith		(Sweden) Jonas Andersson		3, 5, 7–11, 13
(Germany) Toksport WRT	Škoda Fabia RS Rally2	(France) Pierre-Louis Loubet		(France) Loris Pascaud		5–6
(Germany) Toksport WRT	Škoda Fabia RS Rally2	(Republic of Ireland) Josh McErlean	Challenger	(Republic of Ireland) James Fulton	Challenger	6
(Germany) Toksport WRT	Škoda Fabia RS Rally2	(Sweden) Oliver Solberg		(United Kingdom) Elliott Edmondson		2–3, 7–9, 11
(Germany) Toksport WRT 2	Škoda Fabia RS Rally2	(France) Pierre-Louis Loubet		(France) Loris Pascaud		7, 9–10
(Germany) Toksport WRT 2	Škoda Fabia RS Rally2	(Republic of Ireland) Josh McErlean	Challenger	(Republic of Ireland) James Fulton	Challenger	7–10, 12
(Japan) Toyota Gazoo Racing WRJ	Toyota GR Yaris Rally2	(Japan) Norihiko Katsuta		(Japan) Yusuke Kimura		13
(Japan) Toyota Gazoo Racing WRT	Toyota GR Yaris Rally2	(Finland) Jari-Matti Latvala		(Finland) Juho Hänninen		9
(Japan) Toyota Gazoo Racing WRT NG	Toyota GR Yaris Rally2	(Japan) Hikaru Kogure	Challenger	(Finland) Topi Luhtinen	Challenger	2, 4–6, 9, 13
(Japan) Toyota Gazoo Racing WRT NG	Toyota GR Yaris Rally2	(Japan) Yuki Yamamoto	Challenger	(Finland) Marko Salminen	Challenger	2, 4–6, 9, 13

Private entries
Car	Driver		Co-driver		Rounds
Car	Driver name	Category	Co-driver name	Category	Rounds
Citroën C3 Rally2	(United Kingdom) James Leckey	Challenger	(United Kingdom) Stephen McAuley	Challenger	2, 5
Citroën C3 Rally2	(Paraguay) Diego Dominguez Jr.	Challenger	(Spain) Rogelio Peñate	Challenger	3
Citroën C3 Rally2	(Portugal) José Pedro Fontes	Challenger	(Portugal) Inês Ponte	Challenger	5
Citroën C3 Rally2	(France) Pierre Lafay	Challenger	(France) Charlyne Quartini	Challenger	5–6, 9
Citroën C3 Rally2	(Belgium) Maxime Potty	Challenger	(France) Jules Escartefigue	Challenger	6
Citroën C3 Rally2	(Belgium) Maxime Potty	Challenger	(Belgium) Renaud Herman	Challenger	12
Citroën C3 Rally2	(Romania) Cristian Dolofan	Challenger	(Romania) Traian Pavel	Challenger	10
Citroën C3 Rally2	(Chile) Alberto Heller	Challenger	(Argentina) Luis Ernesto Allende	Challenger	11
Citroën C3 Rally2	(Chile) Pedro Heller	Challenger	(Argentina) Pablo Olmos	Challenger	11
Citroën C3 Rally2	(Chile) Emilio Rosselot	Challenger	(Chile) Tomas Cañete	Challenger	11
Citroën C3 Rally2	(Chile) Gerardo Rosselot Valenzuela	Challenger	(Argentina) Marcelo Brizio	Challenger	11
Citroën C3 Rally2	(Japan) Satoshi Imai	Challenger	(New Zealand) Jason Farmer	Challenger	13
Ford Fiesta R5	(France) Patrick Déjean	Challenger	(France) Yannick Jammes	Challenger	5
Ford Fiesta Rally2	(Republic of Ireland) Eamonn Boland	Challenger	(Republic of Ireland) Michael Joseph Morrissey	Challenger	1, 4, 13
Ford Fiesta Rally2	(Belgium) John Wartique	Challenger	(Belgium) Maxime Andernack	Challenger	1
Ford Fiesta Rally2	(Poland) Jarosław Kołtun	Challenger	(Poland) Ireneusz Pleskot	Challenger	2
Ford Fiesta Rally2	(Kenya) Carl Tundo	Challenger	(Kenya) Tim Jessop	Challenger	3
Ford Fiesta Rally2	(Greece) George Vassilakis	Challenger	(United Kingdom) Tom Krawszik	Challenger	3, 6, 10
Ford Fiesta Rally2	(Greece) George Vassilakis	Challenger	(United Kingdom) Allan Harryman	Challenger	13
Ford Fiesta Rally2	(Portugal) Lucas Simões	Challenger	(Portugal) Valter Cardoso	Challenger	5
Ford Fiesta Rally2	(Spain) Pepe López	Challenger	(Spain) David Vázquez	Challenger	6
Hyundai i20 N Rally2	(France) Nicolas Ciamin	Challenger	(France) Yannick Roche	Challenger	1, 3–4, 6
Hyundai i20 N Rally2	(Netherlands) Henk Vossen	Challenger	(Netherlands) Willem Vissenberg	Challenger	1
Hyundai i20 N Rally2	(Netherlands) Henk Vossen	Challenger	(Netherlands) Wim Stupers	Challenger	4
Hyundai i20 N Rally2	(Netherlands) Henk Vossen	Challenger	(Netherlands) Harmen Scholtalbers	Challenger	12
Hyundai i20 N Rally2	(Finland) Emil Lindholm		(Finland) Reeta Hämäläinen		2, 4, 6, 8–9
Hyundai i20 N Rally2	(Luxembourg) Charles Munster	Challenger	(Belgium) Loïc Dumont	Challenger	3
Hyundai i20 N Rally2	(United Kingdom) Kris Meeke		(United Kingdom) Stuart Loudon		5
Hyundai i20 N Rally2	(Finland) Teemu Suninen		(Finland) Mikko Markkula		5–9
Hyundai i20 N Rally2	(Portugal) Ricardo Teodósio	Challenger	(Portugal) José Teixeira	Challenger	5
Hyundai i20 N Rally2	(Finland) Benjamin Korhola		(Finland) Sebastian Virtanen		9
Škoda Fabia R5	(Kenya) Karan Patel	Challenger	(Kenya) Tauseef Khan	Challenger	3
Škoda Fabia R5	(Kenya) Aakif Virani	Challenger	(Kenya) Azhar Bhatti	Challenger	3
Škoda Fabia R5	(Italy) Gianmarco Donetto	Challenger	(Switzerland) Marco Menchini	Challenger	6
Škoda Fabia R5	(Finland) Tommi Jylhä		(Finland) Kimmo Nevanpää		9
Škoda Fabia R5	(Finland) Anssi Rytkönen		(Finland) Mikael Korhonen		9
Škoda Fabia Rally2 evo	(Switzerland) Olivier Burri	Challenger	(France) Anderson Levratti	Challenger	1
Škoda Fabia Rally2 evo	(Italy) Maurizio Chiarani	Challenger	(Italy) Flavio Zanella	Challenger	1, 4, 9
Škoda Fabia Rally2 evo	(Italy) Roberto Daprà	Challenger	(Italy) Luca Guglielmetti	Challenger	1, 4–8, 10
Škoda Fabia Rally2 evo	(Italy) Federico Laurencich	Challenger	(Italy) Alberto Mlakar	Challenger	1
Škoda Fabia Rally2 evo	(Italy) Massimiliano Locatelli	Challenger	(Italy) Stefano Tiraboschi	Challenger	1
Škoda Fabia Rally2 evo	(Italy) Filippo Marchino	Challenger	(Italy) Pietro Elia Ometto	Challenger	1, 4
Škoda Fabia Rally2 evo	(Mexico) Alejandro Mauro	Challenger	(Spain) Adrián Pérez	Challenger	1–2
Škoda Fabia Rally2 evo	(Italy) Maurizio Morato	Challenger	(Italy) Massimiliano Bosi	Challenger	1
Škoda Fabia Rally2 evo	(Spain) Miguel Díaz-Aboitiz	Challenger	(Spain) Rodrigo Sanjuan de Eusebio	Challenger	3
Škoda Fabia Rally2 evo	(Spain) Miguel Díaz-Aboitiz	Challenger	(Spain) Diego Sanjuan de Eusebio	Challenger	12
Škoda Fabia Rally2 evo	(Italy) Enrico Brazzoli	Challenger	(Italy) Martina Musiari	Challenger	4, 6, 10
Škoda Fabia Rally2 evo	(Portugal) Pedro Almeida	Challenger	(Portugal) Mário Castro	Challenger	5
Škoda Fabia Rally2 evo	(Portugal) Ernesto Cunha	Challenger	(Portugal) Rui Raimundo	Challenger	5
Škoda Fabia Rally2 evo	(Portugal) Paulo Neto	Challenger	(Portugal) Nuno Mota Ribeiro	Challenger	5
Škoda Fabia Rally2 evo	(Portugal) Diogo Salvi	Challenger	(Portugal) Carlos Magalhães	Challenger	5
Škoda Fabia Rally2 evo	(Italy) Carlo Covi	Challenger	(Italy) Simone Angi	Challenger	6
Škoda Fabia Rally2 evo	(Italy) Luca Hoelbling	Challenger	(Italy) Mauro Grassi	Challenger	6
Škoda Fabia Rally2 evo	(Italy) Giuseppe Pozzo	Challenger	(Italy) Pier Paolo Cottu	Challenger	6
Škoda Fabia Rally2 evo	(Italy) Simone Romagna	Challenger	(Italy) Dino Lamonato	Challenger	6
Škoda Fabia Rally2 evo	(Italy) Christian Tiramani	Challenger	(Italy) Fabio Grimaldi	Challenger	6
Škoda Fabia Rally2 evo	(Poland) Wojciech Musiał	Challenger	(Poland) Konrad Dudziński	Challenger	7
Škoda Fabia Rally2 evo	(Latvia) Matīss Mežaks	Challenger	(Latvia) Arnis Ronis	Challenger	8
Škoda Fabia Rally2 evo	(Greece) Giorgos Amoutzas	Challenger	(Greece) Giorgos Eliopoulos	Challenger	10
Škoda Fabia Rally2 evo	(Greece) Lambros Athanassoulas	Challenger	(Greece) Nikolaos Zakheos	Challenger	10
Škoda Fabia Rally2 evo	(Greece) Nikos Pavlidis	Challenger	(United Kingdom) Allan Harryman	Challenger	10
Škoda Fabia Rally2 evo	(Chile) Eduardo Kovacs Bauer	Challenger	(Argentina) Fernando Mussano	Challenger	11
Škoda Fabia Rally2 evo	(Argentina) Martin Scuncio	Challenger	(Chile) Javiera Roman	Challenger	11
Škoda Fabia Rally2 evo	(Japan) Osamu Fukunaga	Challenger	(Japan) Misako Saida	Challenger	13
Škoda Fabia RS Rally2	(United Kingdom) Chris Ingram	Challenger	(Republic of Ireland) Hannah McKillop	Challenger	1
Škoda Fabia RS Rally2	(Spain) Pepe López	Challenger	(Spain) David Vázquez	Challenger	1, 4–5
Škoda Fabia RS Rally2	(Italy) Mauro Miele	Challenger	(Italy) Luca Beltrame	Challenger	1, 4, 6, 8–9
Škoda Fabia RS Rally2	(Estonia) Gregor Jeets	Challenger	(Estonia) Timo Taniel	Challenger	2
Škoda Fabia RS Rally2	(Finland) Lauri Joona	Challenger	(Finland) Janni Hussi	Challenger	2, 4–7, 9–10
Škoda Fabia RS Rally2	(Sweden) Isak Reiersen	Challenger	(Sweden) Lucas Karlsson	Challenger	2
Škoda Fabia RS Rally2	(Finland) Marko Viitanen	Challenger	(Finland) Tapio Suominen	Challenger	2
Škoda Fabia RS Rally2	(Paraguay) Fabrizio Zaldivar	Challenger	(Italy) Marcelo Der Ohannesian	Challenger	2, 5–6, 8–11
Škoda Fabia RS Rally2	(Poland) Daniel Chwist	Challenger	(Poland) Kamil Heller	Challenger	3, 6, 13
Škoda Fabia RS Rally2	(Poland) Kajetan Kajetanowicz	Challenger	(Poland) Maciej Szczepaniak	Challenger	3, 6–7, 10–13
Škoda Fabia RS Rally2	(Kenya) Samman Singh Vohra	Challenger	(Kenya) Alfir Khan	Challenger	3
Škoda Fabia RS Rally2	(Germany) Armin Kremer	Challenger	(Germany) Ella Kremer	Challenger	4, 6–8, 10, 12
Škoda Fabia RS Rally2	(Mexico) Ricardo Triviño	Challenger	(Spain) Diego Fuentes Vega	Challenger	4, 6–7, 9
Škoda Fabia RS Rally2	(Portugal) Armindo Araújo	Challenger	(Portugal) Luís Ramalho	Challenger	5
Škoda Fabia RS Rally2	(Mexico) Miguel Granados	Challenger	(Spain) Marc Martí	Challenger	5–6, 10
Škoda Fabia RS Rally2	(Mexico) Alejandro Mauro Sánchez	Challenger	(Spain) Adrián Pérez Fernández	Challenger	5–6
Škoda Fabia RS Rally2	(Republic of Ireland) Josh McErlean	Challenger	(Republic of Ireland) James Fulton	Challenger	5
Škoda Fabia RS Rally2	(Mexico) Juan Carlos Peralta	Challenger	(Mexico) Víctor Pérez Couto	Challenger	5, 10
Škoda Fabia RS Rally2	(Spain) Sergi Pérez Jr.	Challenger	(Spain) Axel Coronado	Challenger	5
Škoda Fabia RS Rally2	(Czech Republic) Martin Prokop	Challenger	(Czech Republic) Michal Ernst	Challenger	5–7, 9
Škoda Fabia RS Rally2	(Sweden) Oliver Solberg		(United Kingdom) Elliott Edmondson		5
Škoda Fabia RS Rally2	(Bolivia) Marco Bulacia	Challenger	(Spain) Diego Vallejo	Challenger	6
Škoda Fabia RS Rally2	(Turkey) Uğur Soylu	Challenger	(Turkey) Sener Guray	Challenger	6–10
Škoda Fabia RS Rally2	(Estonia) Robert Virves	Challenger	(Estonia) Aleks Lesk	Challenger	6–7, 9–10
Škoda Fabia RS Rally2	(Poland) Jarosław Kołtun	Challenger	(Poland) Ireneusz Pleskot	Challenger	7
Škoda Fabia RS Rally2	(Poland) Mikołaj Marczyk	Challenger	(Poland) Szymon Gospodarczyk	Challenger	7, 12
Škoda Fabia RS Rally2	(Latvia) Artūrs Priednieks	Challenger	(Latvia) Janis Kirkovalds	Challenger	8
Škoda Fabia RS Rally2	(Paraguay) Miguel Zaldivar Jr	Challenger	(Argentina) Diego Cagnotti	Challenger	8
Škoda Fabia RS Rally2	(Finland) Teemu Asunmaa	Challenger	(Finland) Ville Mannisenmäki	Challenger	9
Škoda Fabia RS Rally2	(Finland) Tuukka Kauppinen	Challenger	(Finland) Veli-Pekka Karttunen	Challenger	9
Škoda Fabia RS Rally2	(Greece) Giorgos Kechagias	Challenger	(Greece) Nikolaos Petropoulos	Challenger	10
Škoda Fabia RS Rally2	(Greece) Panagiotis Roustemis	Challenger	(Greece) Christos Bakloris	Challenger	10
Škoda Fabia RS Rally2	(Greece) Vassileios Velanis	Challenger	(Greece) Elias Panagiotounis	Challenger	10
Škoda Fabia RS Rally2	(Chile) Jorge Martínez Fontena	Challenger	(Argentina) Alberto Alvarez Nicholson	Challenger	11
Škoda Fabia RS Rally2	(Republic of Ireland) Eamonn Boland	Challenger	(Republic of Ireland) Tobias Braun	Challenger	12
Škoda Fabia RS Rally2	(Czech Republic) Věroslav Cvrček	Challenger	(Czech Republic) Petr Těšínský	Challenger	12
Škoda Fabia RS Rally2	(Germany) Marijan Griebel	Challenger	(Germany) Michael Joseph Morrissey	Challenger	12
Škoda Fabia RS Rally2	(Czech Republic) Petr Nešetřil	Challenger	(Czech Republic) Jiří Černoch	Challenger	12
Toyota GR Yaris Rally2	(France) Bryan Bouffier	Challenger	(France) Frédéric Vauclare	Challenger	1
Toyota GR Yaris Rally2	(France) Stéphane Lefebvre		(France) Andy Malfoy		1
Toyota GR Yaris Rally2	(Spain) Jan Solans	Challenger	(Spain) Rodrigo Sanjuan	Challenger	1–2, 5–6, 10–11, 13
Toyota GR Yaris Rally2	(Finland) Mikko Heikkilä	Challenger	(Finland) Kristian Temonen	Challenger	2, 8–9
Toyota GR Yaris Rally2	(Finland) Roope Korhonen	Challenger	(Finland) Anssi Viinikka	Challenger	2, 5–7, 9
Toyota GR Yaris Rally2	(Estonia) Georg Linnamäe	Challenger	(United Kingdom) James Morgan	Challenger	2, 5–7, 9–10
Toyota GR Yaris Rally2	(Australia) Lewis Bates	Challenger	(United Kingdom) Anthony McLoughlin	Challenger	5
Toyota GR Yaris Rally2	(France) Jean-Michel Raoux	Challenger	(France) Isabelle Galmiche	Challenger	5–6
Toyota GR Yaris Rally2	(Estonia) Gregor Jeets	Challenger	(Estonia) Timo Taniel	Challenger	7–9
Toyota GR Yaris Rally2	(Canada) Brandon Semenuk	Challenger	(United Kingdom) Keaton Williams	Challenger	8
Toyota GR Yaris Rally2	(Finland) Juhana Raitanen	Challenger	(Finland) Samu Vaaleri	Challenger	9
Toyota GR Yaris Rally2	(United Kingdom) Chris Ingram	Challenger	(United States) Alexander Kihurani	Challenger	13
Toyota GR Yaris Rally2	(Finland) Heikki Kovalainen	Challenger	(Japan) Sae Kitagawa	Challenger	13
Toyota GR Yaris Rally2	(Japan) Fumio Nutahara	Challenger	(Japan) Shungo Azuma	Challenger	13
Volkswagen Polo GTI R5	(Italy) Jacopo Bergamin	Challenger	(Italy) Alice Tasselli	Challenger	1
Volkswagen Polo GTI R5	(Greece) Jourdan Serderidis	Challenger	(Belgium) Frédéric Miclotte	Challenger	1

=== In detail ===
Citroën Racing announced three factory-supported entries in the category, retaining Yohan Rossel and signing Nikolay Gryazin and Marco Bulacia. Rossel and Gryazin's entries will be run in collaboration with Belgian outfit DG Sport Compétition, while Portuguese team Sports & You will run Bulacia's entry.

Toksport WRT will run three entries supported by Škoda Motorsport. The German team retains Oliver Solberg and Gus Greensmith from 2023, while Pierre-Louis Loubet returns to the category, moving over from the Rally1 category and M-Sport Ford.

Sami Pajari left Toksport WRT after the 2023 season. Instead, he will drive the new Toyota GR Yaris Rally2, his entry being run by Finnish team Printsport.

== Regulation changes ==
Power Stage points were removed from WRC2 for the 2024 season. The FIA cited complaints about the disparity in running order – where the top-five WRC2 competitors would run out of order from the other cars in class – as the primary reason for the regulation change.

== Results and standings ==
=== Season summary ===
Round	Event	Winning driver	Winning co-driver	Winning entrant	Winning time	Report	Ref.
1	(Monaco) Rallye Automobile Monte Carlo	(France) Yohan Rossel	(France) Arnaud Dunand	(Belgium) DG Sport Compétition	3:20:00.7	Report	
2	Rally Sweden	(Sweden) Oliver Solberg	(United Kingdom) Elliott Edmondson	(Germany) Toksport WRT	2:38:09.1	Report	
3	Safari Rally Kenya	(United Kingdom) Gus Greensmith	(Sweden) Jonas Andersson	(Germany) Toksport WRT	3:54:09.1	Report	
4	Croatia Rally	(Bulgaria) Nikolay Gryazin	Konstantin Aleksandrov	(Belgium) DG Sport Compétition	2:49:44.9	Report	
5	Rally de Portugal	(Spain) Jan Solans	(Spain) Rodrigo Sanjuan de Eusebio	(Spain) Jan Solans	3:53:25.2	Report	
6	(Italy) Rally Italia Sardegna	(Finland) Sami Pajari	(Finland) Enni Mälkönen	(Finland) Printsport	3:13:19.0	Report	
7	Rally Poland	(Finland) Sami Pajari	(Finland) Enni Mälkönen	(Finland) Printsport	2:40:58.3	Report	
8	Rally Latvia	(Sweden) Oliver Solberg	(United Kingdom) Elliott Edmondson	(Germany) Toksport WRT	2:40:25.5	Report	
9	Rally Finland	(Sweden) Oliver Solberg	(United Kingdom) Elliott Edmondson	(Germany) Toksport WRT	2:33:57.4	Report	
10	Acropolis Rally Greece	(Finland) Sami Pajari	(Finland) Enni Mälkönen	(Finland) Printsport	3:45:05.3	Report	
11	Rally Chile	(France) Yohan Rossel	(France) Florian Barral	(Belgium) DG Sport Compétition	3:07:31.2	Report	
12	(Europe) Central European Rally	(Bulgaria) Nikolay Gryazin	Konstantin Aleksandrov	(Belgium) DG Sport Compétition	2:46:52.2	Report	
13	Rally Japan	(Bulgaria) Nikolay Gryazin	Konstantin Aleksandrov	(Bulgaria) Nikolay Gryazin	3:33:45.3	Report	

=== Scoring system ===
A team has to enter two cars to score points in an event. Drivers and teams must nominate a scoring rally when they enter the event and the best six scores from seven nominated rallies will count towards the final classification. Registered drivers are able to enter additional rallies with Priority 2 status without scoring points.

Position	1st	2nd	3rd	4th	5th	6th	7th	8th	9th	10th
Points	25	18	15	12	10	8	6	4	2	1

=== FIA WRC2 Championship for Drivers ===
Pos.	Driver	MON (Monaco)	SWE (Sweden)	KEN (Kenya)	CRO (Croatia)	POR (Portugal)	ITA (Italy)	POL (Poland)	LAT (Latvia)	FIN (Finland)	GRE (Greece)	CHL (Chile)	EUR (Europe)	JPN (Japan)	Points
1	(Finland) Sami Pajari	NC	2		NC	Ret	1	1	3		1			2	126
2	(Sweden) Oliver Solberg	NC	1	2		Ret	DNS	2	1	1		4	NC		123
3	(Bulgaria) Nikolay Gryazin	3	NC		1	NC	NC	6	NC	NC	21	2	1	1	116
4	(France) Yohan Rossel	1			2	5	2			NC	3	1	11		111
5	(Poland) Kajetan Kajetanowicz			3			5	19			4	5	4	5	69
6	(Finland) Lauri Joona		6		6	3	7	7		3	13				58
7	(United Kingdom) Gus Greensmith			1	NC	Ret		9	NC	Ret	Ret	3		4	54
8	(Spain) Jan Solans	6	12			1	3			NC	8	9		11	54
9	(Republic of Ireland) Josh McErlean					2	8	Ret	8	6	6		5		50
10	(Estonia) Robert Virves						6	3		8	2				45
11	(Paraguay) Fabrizio Zaldivar		17			4	21		4	Ret	5	6			42
12	(Estonia) Georg Linnamäe		3		Ret	8	27	4		5	19				41
13	(Finland) Mikko Heikkilä		5						2	4					40
14	(France) Nicolas Ciamin	4		4	4		30								36
15	(Spain) Pepe López	2			3	Ret	WD								33
16	(Finland) Roope Korhonen		4			6	WD	8		6					32
17	(Italy) Roberto Daprà	14			7	9	9	13	6		7				24
18	(Finland) Jari-Matti Latvala									2					18
19	(Czech Republic) Filip Mareš												2		18
20	(Czech Republic) Martin Prokop					7	4	12		11	WD				18
21	(Poland) Mikołaj Marczyk							10					3		16
22	(Japan) Hiroki Arai													3	15
23	(Republic of Ireland) William Creighton		14		10	12	28		5	Ret			9		13
24	(France) Pierre-Louis Loubet					Ret	Ret	5		Ret	Ret				10
25	(France) Stéphane Lefebvre	5													10
26	(Luxembourg) Charles Munster			5											10
27	(Norway) Eyvind Brynildsen				5										10
28	(Poland) Daniel Chwist			6			14							9	10
29	(Finland) Emil Lindholm		7		8		24		Ret	Ret					10
30	(Germany) Armin Kremer				9		10	14	9		10		8		10
31	(Japan) Hikaru Kogure		20		12	Ret	Ret			Ret				6	8
32	(Germany) Marijan Griebel												6		8
33	(Estonia) Gregor Jeets		11					Ret	7	DNS					6
34	(Belgium) Maxime Potty						25						7		6
35	(Switzerland) Olivier Burri	7													6
36	(Kenya) Carl Tundo			7											6
37	(Chile) Jorge Martínez Fontena											7			6
38	(Japan) Norihiko Katsuta													7	6
39	(Italy) Mauro Miele	8			13		19		Ret	Ret					4
40	(Greece) George Vassilakis			8			22							12	4
41	(Sweden) Isak Reiersen		8												4
42	(Chile) Alberto Heller											8			4
43	(Japan) Fumio Nutahara													8	4
44	(Poland) Michał Sołowow		9					15							2
45	(Republic of Ireland) Eamonn Boland	9			Ret								12	13	2
46	(Kenya) Aakif Virani			9											2
47	(Finland) Teemu Asunmaa									9					2
48	(Greece) Panagiotis Roustemis										9				2
49	(Japan) Yuki Yamamoto		10		11	Ret	31								1
50	(Saudi Arabia) Rakan Al-Rashed		16						10						1
51	(Greece) Jourdan Serderidis	10													1
52	(Kenya) Karan Patel			10											1
53	(Portugal) Armindo Araújo					10									1
54	(Finland) Benjamin Korhola									10					1
55	(Chile) Pedro Heller											10			1
56	(Czech Republic) Věroslav Cvrček ml.												10		1
57	(Japan) Osamu Fukunaga													10	1
Pos.	Driver	MON (Monaco)	SWE (Sweden)	KEN (Kenya)	CRO (Croatia)	POR (Portugal)	ITA (Italy)	POL (Poland)	LAT (Latvia)	FIN (Finland)	GRE (Greece)	CHL (Chile)	EUR (Europe)	JPN (Japan)	Points

Key
Colour	Result
Gold	Winner
Silver	2nd place
Bronze	3rd place
Green	Points finish
Blue	Non-points finish
Blue	Non-classified finish (NC)
Purple	Did not finish (Ret)
Black	Excluded (EX)
Black	Disqualified (DSQ)
White	Did not start (DNS)
White	Cancelled (C)
Blank	Withdrew entry from the event (WD)

=== FIA WRC2 Championship for Co-drivers ===
Pos.	Driver	MON (Monaco)	SWE (Sweden)	KEN (Kenya)	CRO (Croatia)	POR (Portugal)	ITA (Italy)	POL (Poland)	LAT (Latvia)	FIN (Finland)	GRE (Greece)	CHL (Chile)	EUR (Europe)	JPN (Japan)	Points
1	(Finland) Enni Mälkönen	NC	2		NC	Ret	1	1	3		1			2	126
2	(United Kingdom) Elliott Edmondson	NC	1	2		Ret	DNS	2	1	1		4	NC		123
3	Konstantin Aleksandrov	3	NC		1	NC	NC	6			21	2	1	1	116
4	(Poland) Maciej Szczepaniak			3			5	19			4	5	4	5	69
5	(Finland) Janni Hussi		6		6	3	7	7		3					58
6	(Sweden) Jonas Andersson			1	NC	Ret		9	NC	Ret	Ret	3		4	54
7	(Spain) Rodrigo Sanjuan de Eusebio	6	12	Ret		1	3				8	9		11	54
8	(France) Arnaud Dunand	1			2	5									53
9	(Republic of Ireland) James Fulton					2	8	Ret	8	7	6		5		50
10	(Estonia) Aleks Lesk						6	3		8	2				45
11	(Italy) Marcelo Der Ohannesian		17			4	21		4	19	5	6			42
12	(United Kingdom) James Morgan		3		Ret	8	27	4			19				41
13	(France) Florian Barral										3	1	11		40
14	(Finland) Kristian Temonen		5						2	4					40
15	(France) Yannick Roche	4		4	4		30								36
16	(Spain) David Vázquez Liste	2			3	Ret	WD								33
17	(Finland) Anssi Viinikka		4			6	WD	8		6					32
18	(Italy) Luca Guglielmetti	14			7	9	9	13	6		7				24
19	(France) Benjamin Boulloud						2								18
20	(Finland) Juho Hänninen									2					18
21	(Czech Republic) Radovan Bucha												2		18
22	(Czech Republic) Michal Ernst					7	4	12		11	WD				18
23	(Poland) Szymon Gospodarczyk							10					3		16
24	(Japan) Shunsuke Matsuo													3	15
25	(Republic of Ireland) Liam Regan		14		10	12	28		5	18			9		13
26	(France) Loris Pascaud					Ret	Ret	5		Ret	Ret				10
27	(France) Andy Malfoy	5													10
28	(Belgium) Loïc Dumont			5											10
29	(Norway) Jørn Listerud				5										10
30	(Poland) Kamil Heller			6			14							9	10
31	(Finland) Reeta Hämäläinen		7		8		24		Ret	20					10
32	(Germany) Ella Kremer				9		10	14	9		10		8		10
33	(Finland) Topi Matias Luhtinen		20		12	Ret	Ret			Ret				6	8
34	(Germany) Tobias Braun												6		8
35	(Estonia) Timo Taniel		11					Ret	7	WD					6
36	(France) Anderson Levratti	7													6
37	(Kenya) Tim Jessop			7											6
38	(Argentina) Alberto Alvarez Nicholson											7			6
39	(Belgium) Renaud Herman												7		6
40	(Japan) Yusuke Kimura													7	6
41	(Italy) Luca Beltrame	8			13		19		Ret	WD					4
42	(United Kingdom) Tom Krawszik			8			22				16				4
43	(Sweden) Lucas Karlsson		8												4
44	(Argentina) Luis Ernesto Allende											8			4
45	(Japan) Shungo Azuma													8	4
46	(Poland) Maciej Baran		9					15							2
47	(Republic of Ireland) Michael Joseph Morrissey	9			Ret								12	13	2
48	(Kenya) Azhar Bhatti			9											2
49	(Finland) Ville Mannisenmäki									9					2
50	(Greece) Christos Bakloris														2
51	(Finland) Marko Salminen		10		11	Ret	31								1
52	(Portugal) Hugo Magalhães		16			WD			10						1
53	(Belgium) Frédéric Miclotte	10													1
54	(Kenya) Tauseef Khan			10											1
55	(Portugal) Luís Ramalho					10									1
56	(Finland) Sebastian Virtanen									10					1
57	(Argentina) Pablo Olmos											10			1
58	(Czech Republic) Petr Těšínský												10		1
59	(Japan) Misako Saida													10	1
Pos.	Driver	MON (Monaco)	SWE (Sweden)	KEN (Kenya)	CRO (Croatia)	POR (Portugal)	ITA (Italy)	POL (Poland)	LAT (Latvia)	FIN (Finland)	GRE (Greece)	CHL (Chile)	EUR (Europe)	JPN (Japan)	Points

Key
Colour	Result
Gold	Winner
Silver	2nd place
Bronze	3rd place
Green	Points finish
Blue	Non-points finish
Blue	Non-classified finish (NC)
Purple	Did not finish (Ret)
Black	Excluded (EX)
Black	Disqualified (DSQ)
White	Did not start (DNS)
White	Cancelled (C)
Blank	Withdrew entry from the event (WD)

=== FIA WRC2 Championship for Teams ===
Pos.	Driver	MON (Monaco)	SWE (Sweden)	KEN (Kenya)	CRO (Croatia)	POR (Portugal)	ITA (Italy)	POL (Poland)	LAT (Latvia)	FIN (Finland)	GRE (Greece)	CHL (Chile)	EUR (Europe)	JPN (Japan)	Points
1	(Belgium) DG Sport Compétition	1			1	1	1				1	1	1		289
1	(Belgium) DG Sport Compétition	2			2	2	3				3	2	4		289
2	(Germany) Toksport WRT			1	3	Ret		1	1	1		3			205
2	(Germany) Toksport WRT			2	4	Ret		3	2	Ret		4			205
3	(Germany) Toksport WRT 2						2	2		2	2		2	1	145
3	(Germany) Toksport WRT 2						Ret	Ret		Ret	Ret		3	3	145
4	(Japan) Toyota Gazoo Racing WRT NG		1		5	Ret	4			Ret				2	91
4	(Japan) Toyota Gazoo Racing WRT NG		2		6	Ret	Ret			Ret				Ret	91
Pos.	Driver	MON (Monaco)	SWE (Sweden)	KEN (Kenya)	CRO (Croatia)	POR (Portugal)	ITA (Italy)	POL (Poland)	LAT (Latvia)	FIN (Finland)	GRE (Greece)	CHL (Chile)	EUR (Europe)	JPN (Japan)	Points

Key
Colour	Result
Gold	Winner
Silver	2nd place
Bronze	3rd place
Green	Points finish
Blue	Non-points finish
Blue	Non-classified finish (NC)
Purple	Did not finish (Ret)
Black	Excluded (EX)
Black	Disqualified (DSQ)
White	Did not start (DNS)
White	Cancelled (C)
Blank	Withdrew entry from the event (WD)

=== FIA WRC2 Challenger Championship for Drivers ===
Pos.	Driver	MON (Monaco)	SWE (Sweden)	KEN (Kenya)	CRO (Croatia)	POR (Portugal)	ITA (Italy)	POL (Poland)	LAT (Latvia)	FIN (Finland)	GRE (Greece)	CHL (Chile)	EUR (Europe)	JPN (Japan)	Points
1	(Finland) Sami Pajari		1			Ret	1	1	2		1			2	136
2	(Bulgaria) Nikolay Gryazin	2			1			4			20	1	1	1	130
3	(Poland) Kajetan Kajetanowicz			1			4	15			3	2	4	4	94
4	(Finland) Lauri Joona		5		5	3	6	5		1	12				78
5	(Spain) Jan Solans	4	10			1	2				7	6		10	71
6	(Republic of Ireland) Josh McErlean					2	7	Ret	7	5	5		5		60
7	(Finland) Mikko Heikkilä		4						1	2					55
8	(Estonia) Robert Virves						5	2		6	2				54
9	(Estonia) Georg Linnamäe		2			7	25	3		3					54
10	(Paraguay) Fabrizio Zaldivar		15			4	20		3	17	4	3			54
11	(France) Nicolas Ciamin	3		2	3		28								48
12	(Finland) Roope Korhonen		3			5	WD	6		4					45
13	(Spain) Pepe López	1			2	Ret	WD								43
14	(Italy) Roberto Daprà	12			6	8	8	9	5		6				36
15	(Czech Republic) Martin Prokop					6	3	8		9	WD				29
16	(Poland) Mikołaj Marczyk							7					3		21
17	(Germany) Armin Kremer				7		9	10	8		9		8		19
18	(Czech Republic) Filip Mareš												2		18
19	(Republic of Ireland) William Creighton		12		8	11	26		4	16			9		18
20	(Poland) Daniel Chwist			4			13							8	16
21	(Luxembourg) Charles Munster			3											15
22	(Japan) Hiroki Arai													3	15
23	(Norway) Eyvind Brynildsen				4										12
24	(Chile) Jorge Martínez Fontena											4			12
25	(Japan) Hikaru Kogure		20		10	Ret	Ret			Ret				5	11
26	(Switzerland) Olivier Burri	5													10
27	(Kenya) Carl Tundo			5											10
28	(Chile) Alberto Heller											5			10
29	(Estonia) Gregor Jeets		9					Ret	6	WD					10
30	(Greece) George Vassilakis			6			21				15			11	8
31	(Italy) Mauro Miele	6			11		18		Ret	WD					8
32	(Sweden) Isak Reiersen		6												8
33	(Japan) Norihiko Katsuta													6	8
34	(Germany) Marijan Griebel												6		8
35	(Republic of Ireland) Eamonn Boland	7			Ret								11	12	6
36	(Poland) Michał Sołowow		7					11							6
37	(Belgium) Maxime Potty						23						7		6
38	(Kenya) Karan Patel			7											6
39	(Finland) Teemu Asunmaa									7					6
40	(Chile) Pedro Heller											7			6
41	(Japan) Fumio Nutahara													7	6
42	(Japan) Yuki Yamamoto		8		9	Ret	29			Ret				Ret	6
43	(Greece) Jourdan Serderidis	8													4
44	(Kenya) Aakif Virani			8											4
45	(Finland) Benjamin Korhola									8					4
46	(Greece) Panagiotis Roustemis										8				4
47	(Chile) Emilio Rosselot											8			4
48	(Mexico) Alejandro Mauro Sánchez	9	13			Ret	11								2
49	(Saudi Arabia) Rakan Al-Rashed		14			WD			9						2
50	(Portugal) Armindo Araújo					9									2
51	(Chile) Eduardo Kovacs											9			2
52	(Japan) Osamu Fukunaga													9	2
53	(Mexico) Miguel Granados					Ret	15				10				1
54	(France) Jean-Michel Raoux					10	Ret								1
55	(France) Pierre Lafay					Ret	10			Ret					1
56	(Italy) Federico Laurencich	10													1
57	(Latvia) Matīss Mežaks								10						1
58	(Finland) Juhana Raitanen									10					1
59	(Chile) Gerardo V. Rosselot											10			1
60	(Czech Republic) Věroslav Cvrček ml.												10		1
Pos.	Driver	MON (Monaco)	SWE (Sweden)	KEN (Kenya)	CRO (Croatia)	POR (Portugal)	ITA (Italy)	POL (Poland)	LAT (Latvia)	FIN (Finland)	GRE (Greece)	CHL (Chile)	EUR (Europe)	JPN (Japan)	Points

Key
Colour	Result
Gold	Winner
Silver	2nd place
Bronze	3rd place
Green	Points finish
Blue	Non-points finish
Blue	Non-classified finish (NC)
Purple	Did not finish (Ret)
Black	Excluded (EX)
Black	Disqualified (DSQ)
White	Did not start (DNS)
White	Cancelled (C)
Blank	Withdrew entry from the event (WD)

=== FIA WRC2 Challenger Championship for Co-drivers ===
Pos.	Driver	MON (Monaco)	SWE (Sweden)	KEN (Kenya)	CRO (Croatia)	POR (Portugal)	ITA (Italy)	POL (Poland)	LAT (Latvia)	FIN (Finland)	GRE (Greece)	CHL (Chile)	EUR (Europe)	JPN (Japan)	Points
1	(Finland) Enni Mälkönen		1			Ret	1	1	2		1			2	136
2	Konstantin Aleksandrov	2			1			4			20	1	1	1	130
4	(Poland) Maciej Szczepaniak			1			4	15			3	2	4	4	94
3	(Finland) Janni Hussi		5		5	3	6	5		1					78
5	(Spain) Rodrigo Sanjuan de Eusebio	4	10			1	2				7	6		10	71
6	(Republic of Ireland) James Fulton					2	7	Ret	7	5	5		5		60
7	(Finland) Kristian Temonen		4						1	2					55
8	(Estonia) Aleks Lesk						5	2		6	2				54
9	(United Kingdom) James Morgan		2			7	25	3		3	18				54
10	(Italy) Marcelo Der Ohannesian		15			4	20		3	17	4	3			54
11	(France) Yannick Roche	3		2	3		28								48
12	(Finland) Anssi Viinikka		3			5	WD	6		4					45
13	(Spain) David Vázquez Liste	1			2	Ret	WD								43
14	(Italy) Luca Guglielmetti	12			6	8	8	9	5		6				36
15	(Czech Republic) Michal Ernst					6	3	8		9	WD				29
16	(Poland) Szymon Gospodarczyk							7					3		21
17	(Germany) Ella Kremer				7		9	10	8		9		8		19
18	(Czech Republic) Radovan Bucha												2		18
19	(Republic of Ireland) Liam Regan		12		8	11	26		4	16			9		18
20	(Poland) Kamil Heller			4			13							8	16
21	(Belgium) Loïc Dumont			3											15
22	(Japan) Shunsuke Matsuo													3	15
23	(Norway) Jørn Listerud				4										12
24	(Argentina) Alberto Alvarez Nicholson											4			12
25	(Finland) Topi Matias Luhtinen		18		10	Ret	Ret			Ret				5	11
26	(France) Anderson Levratti	5													10
27	(Kenya) Tim Jessop			5											10
28	(Argentina) Luis Ernesto Allende											5			10
29	(Estonia) Timo Taniel		9					Ret	6	WD					10
30	(Italy) Luca Beltrame	6			11		18			WD					8
31	(United Kingdom) Tom Krawszik			6			21				15				8
32	(Sweden) Lucas Karlsson		6												8
33	(Germany) Tobias Braun												6		8
34	(Japan) Yusuke Kimura													6	8
35	(Republic of Ireland) Michael Joseph Morrissey	7			Ret								11	12	6
36	(Poland) Maciej Baran		7					11							6
37	(Finland) Ville Mannisenmäki									7	12				6
38	(Kenya) Tauseef Khan			7											6
39	(Argentina) Pablo Olmos											7			6
40	(Belgium) Renaud Herman												7		6
41	(Japan) Shungo Azuma													7	6
42	(Finland) Marko Salminen		8		9	Ret	29			Ret				Ret	6
43	(Belgium) Frédéric Miclotte	8													4
44	(Kenya) Zahir Shah			8											4
45	(Finland) Sebastian Virtanen									8					4
46	(Greece) Christos Bakloris										8				4
47	(Chile) Tomas Cañete											8			4
48	(Spain) Adrián Pérez Fernández	9	13			Ret	11								2
49	(Portugal) Hugo Magalhães		14			WD			9						2
50	(Portugal) Luís Ramalho					9									2
51	(Argentina) Fernando Mussano											9			2
52	(Japan) Misako Saida													9	2
53	(Spain) Marc Martí					Ret	15				10				1
54	(France) Isabelle Galmiche					10	Ret								1
55	(France) Charlyne Quartini					Ret	10			Ret					1
56	(Italy) Alberto Mlakar	10													1
57	(Latvia) Arnis Ronis								10						1
58	(Finland) Samu Vaaleri									10					1
59	(Argentina) Marcelo Brizio											10			1
60	(Czech Republic) Petr Těšínský												10		1
Pos.	Driver	MON (Monaco)	SWE (Sweden)	KEN (Kenya)	CRO (Croatia)	POR (Portugal)	ITA (Italy)	POL (Poland)	LAT (Latvia)	FIN (Finland)	GRE (Greece)	CHL (Chile)	EUR (Europe)	JPN (Japan)	Points

Key
Colour	Result
Gold	Winner
Silver	2nd place
Bronze	3rd place
Green	Points finish
Blue	Non-points finish
Blue	Non-classified finish (NC)
Purple	Did not finish (Ret)
Black	Excluded (EX)
Black	Disqualified (DSQ)
White	Did not start (DNS)
White	Cancelled (C)
Blank	Withdrew entry from the event (WD)
