= Nicolas Ciamin =

French rally driver

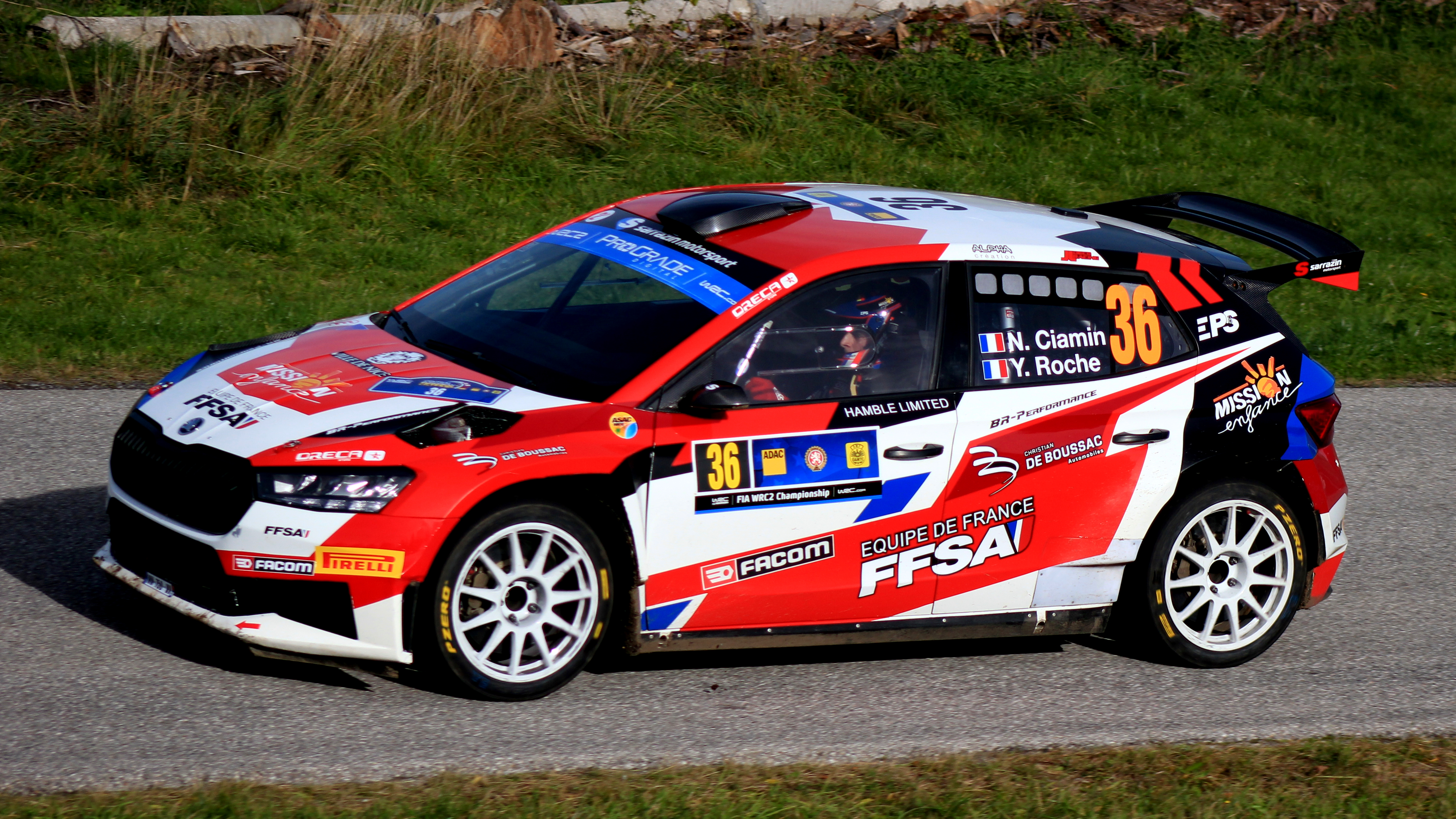
- Ciamin during the 2023 Central European Rally

Personal information
- Nationality: (France) French
- Born: 18 February 1998 (age 28); Nice, France

World Rally Championship record
- Years active: 2016–2021, 2023–present
- Co-driver: (France) Yannick Roche
- Rallies: 36
- Championships: 0
- Rally wins: 0
- Podiums: 0
- Stage wins: 0
- Total points: 2
- First rally: 2016 Rally de Portugal

Nicolas Ciamin (born 18 February 1998) is a French rally driver.

== Biography ==
Ciamin is the son of Gilles Ciamin, a French champion in motorcycle trials. He made his WRC debut in 2016.

== Rally results ==
=== WRC results ===
Year	Entrant	Car	1	2	3	4	5	6	7	8	9	10	11	12	13	14	WDC	Points
2016	Nicolas Ciamin	Ford Fiesta R2T	MON	SWE	MEX	ARG	POR; 38	ITA	POL; 42	FIN; Ret	GER; 47	CHN; C	FRA; Ret	ESP; Ret	GBR	AUS	NC	0
2017	Nicolas Ciamin	Ford Fiesta R2T	MON	SWE	MEX	FRA; 24	ARG	POR; Ret	ITA; 20	POL; 27	FIN; 24	GER; 47	ESP; 39	GBR	AUS		NC	0
2018	Nicolas Ciamin	Abarth 124 Rally R-GT	MON; Ret	SWE	MEX												NC	0
2018	Nicolas Ciamin	Hyundai i20 R5				FRA; Ret	ARG	POR	ITA; 13	FIN; Ret	GER; 15	TUR	GBR	ESP	AUS		NC	0
2019	Nicolas Ciamin	Volkswagen Polo GTI R5	MON; 16	SWE	MEX	FRA; Ret	ARG	CHL	POR	ITA	FIN	GER; Ret	TUR	GBR	ESP	AUS; C	NC	0
2020	Nicolas Ciamin	Citroën C3 R5	MON; 11	SWE	MEX	EST; 18	TUR	ITA; 36	MNZ								NC	0
2021	Nicolas Ciamin	Citroën C3 Rally2	MON; 14	ARC	CRO; 15	POR; 16	ITA; 14	KEN	EST	BEL	GRE	FIN	ESP	MNZ			NC	0
2023	Nicolas Ciamin	Volkswagen Polo GTI R5	MON	SWE; Ret	MEX	CRO	POR	ITA; 33	KEN	EST	FIN; 16	GRE	CHL				24th	2
2023	Nicolas Ciamin	Škoda Fabia RS Rally2												EUR; 9	JPN		24th	2
2024	Nicolas Ciamin	Hyundai i20 N Rally2	MON; 11	SWE	KEN; 11	CRO; 13	POR	ITA; 59	POL	LAT	FIN	GRE	CHL	EUR	JPN		NC*	0*

* Season still in progress.

=== WRC-2 results ===
Year	Entrant	Car	1	2	3	4	5	6	7	8	9	10	11	12	13	14	Pos.	Points
2018	Hyundai Motorsport	Hyundai i20 R5	MON	SWE	MEX	FRA; Ret	ARG	POR	ITA; 3	FIN; Ret	GER; 7	TUR	GBR	ESP	AUS		20th	21
2019	THX Racing	Volkswagen Polo GTI R5	MON; 5	SWE	MEX	FRA; Ret	ARG	CHL	POR	ITA	FIN	GER; Ret	TUR	GBR	ESP	AUS; C	29th	10
2023	Nicolas Ciamin	Volkswagen Polo GTI R5	MON	SWE	MEX	CRO; Ret	POR	ITA; 20	KEN	EST	FIN; 10	GRE	CHL				15th	27
2023	Nicolas Ciamin	Škoda Fabia RS Rally2												EUR; 1	JPN		15th	27
2024	Nicolas Ciamin	Hyundai i20 N Rally2	MON; 4	SWE	KEN; 4	CRO; 4	POR	ITA; 30	POL	LAT	FIN	GRE	CHL	EUR	JPN		9th*	36*

=== WRC-3 results ===
Year	Entrant	Car	1	2	3	4	5	6	7	8	9	10	11	12	13	Pos.	Points
2017	M-Sport	Ford Fiesta R2T	MON	SWE	MEX	FRA; 3	ARG	POR; Ret	ITA; 2	POL; 4	FIN; 1	GER; 5	ESP; 6	GBR	AUS	3rd	88
2020	DG Sport Compétition	Citroën C3 R5	MON; 2	SWE	MEX	EST; 6	TUR	ITA; 6	MNZ							6th	28
2021	DG Sport Compétition	Citroën C3 Rally2	MON; 3	ARC	CRO; 4	POR; 4	ITA; 6	KEN	EST	BEL	GRE	FIN	ESP	MNZ		5th	57

=== Drive DMACK Fiesta Trophy ===
Year	Entrant	Car	1	2	3	4	5	Pos.	Points
2016	Nicolas Ciamin	Ford Fiesta R2T	POR; 3	POL; 8	FIN; Ret	GER; 4	ESP; Ret	7th	34
