= 2016 Drive DMACK Fiesta Trophy =

The 2016 Drive DMACK Fiesta Trophy is the third season of the Drive DMACK Fiesta Trophy, an auto racing championship recognized by the Fédération Internationale de l'Automobile, running in support of the World Rally Championship. It uses Ford Fiesta R2Ts.

It was also the last season of the series, as the suppliers of the Junior WRC changed from Citroen to M-Sport in 2017.

== Drivers ==
The following drivers took part in the championship.

| No. | Driver | Co-driver | Rounds |
|---|---|---|---|
| 101 | (Portugal) Bernardo Sousa | (Portugal) Hugo Magalhães | 1–3 |
| 102 | (Finland) Max Vatanen | (France) Jacques-Julien Renucci | All |
| 103 | (United Kingdom) Osian Pryce | (United Kingdom) Dale Furniss | All |
| 104 | (United Kingdom) Gus Greensmith | (Italy) Alex Gelsomino | All |
| 106 | (United Kingdom) Jon Armstrong | (Republic of Ireland) Noel O'Sullivan | All |
| 107 | (Poland) Jakub Brzeziński | (Poland) Bartłomiej Boba | All |
| 108 | (United States) Dillon van Way | (United Kingdom) Andrew Edwards | 1 |
| 109 | (Norway) Oscar Solberg | (Sweden) Patrik Barth | All |
| 110 | (France) Nicolas Ciamin | (France) Thibault de la Haye | All |
| 111 | (Kenya) Karan Patel | (United Kingdom) Phil Hall | All |

=== FIA Drive DMACK Cup for Drivers ===
| Pos. | Driver | POR (Portugal) | POL (Poland) | FIN (Finland) | DEU (Germany) | ESP (Spain) | Points |
|---|---|---|---|---|---|---|---|
| 1 | (United Kingdom) Osian Pryce | 1 | 2 | 6 | 1 | 5 | 112 |
| 2 | (Finland) Max Vatanen | 2 | 5 | 1 | 2 | 3 | 105 |
| 3 | (United Kingdom) Jon Armstrong | 4 | 1 | Ret | 3 | 1 | 97 |
| 4 | (United Kingdom) Gus Greensmith | Ret | 4 | Ret | 6 | 2 | 52 |
| 5 | (Portugal) Bernardo Sousa | Ret | 3 | 2 | | | 47 |
| 6 | (Poland) Jakub Brzeziński | 6 | 6 | 3 | Ret | 4 | 43 |
| 7 | (France) Nicolas Ciamin | 3 | 8 | Ret | 4 | Ret | 34 |
| 8 | (Norway) Oscar Solberg | 7 | 7 | 4 | 5 | Ret | 34 |
| 9 | (Kenya) Karan Patel | Ret | 9 | 5 | Ret | Ret | 12 |
| 10 | (United States) Dillon van Way | 5 | | | | | 10 |
| Pos. | Driver | POR (Portugal) | POL (Poland) | FIN (Finland) | DEU (Germany) | ESP (Spain) | Points |

Key
| Colour | Result |
|---|---|
| Gold | Winner |
| Silver | 2nd place |
| Bronze | 3rd place |
| Green | Points finish |
| Blue | Non-points finish |
| Blue | Non-classified finish (NC) |
| Purple | Did not finish (Ret) |
| Black | Excluded (EX) |
| Black | Disqualified (DSQ) |
| White | Did not start (DNS) |
| White | Cancelled (C) |
| Blank | Withdrew entry from the event (WD) |
