= 2024 Croatia Rally =

48th edition of Croatia Rally

2024 Croatia Rally Croatia Rally 2024
Round 4 of 13 in the 2024 World Rally Championship
← Previous event	Next event →
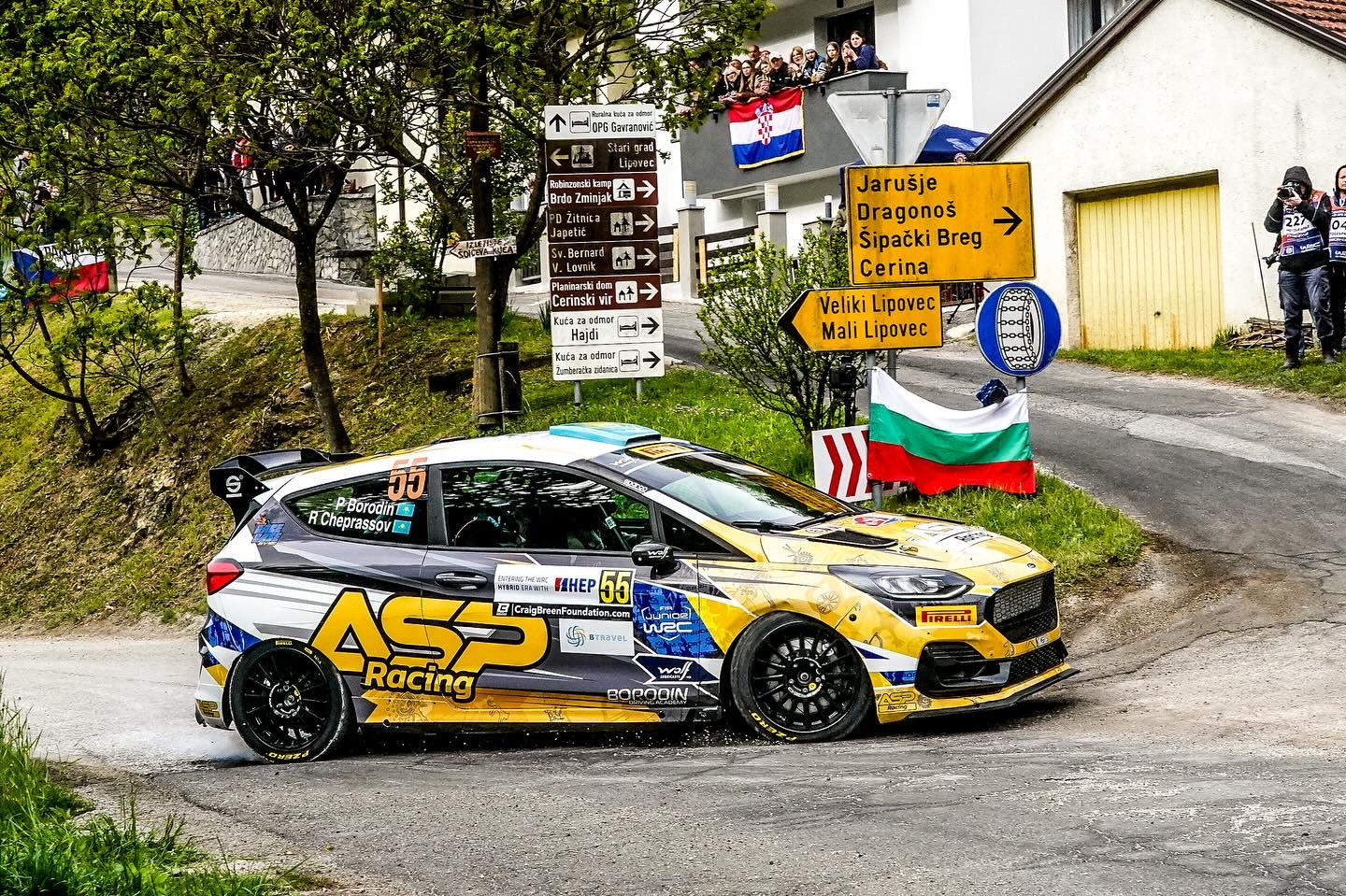
- The Croatia Rally is the first tarmac rally on the calendar.
- Host country: Croatia
- Rally base: Zagreb
- Dates run: 18 – 21 April 2024
- Start location: Krašić, Zagreb County
- Finish location: Kumrovec, Krapina-Zagorje
- Stages: 20 (283.28 km; 176.02 miles)
- Stage surface: Tarmac
- Transport distance: 1,118.65 km (695.10 miles)
- Overall distance: 1,401.93 km (871.12 miles)

Statistics
- Crews registered: 68
- Crews: 67 at start, 62 at finish

Overall results
- Overall winner: (France) Sébastien Ogier (France) Vincent Landais (Japan) Toyota Gazoo Racing WRT; 2:40:23.6
- Saturday Overall leader: (Belgium) Thierry Neuville (Belgium) Martijn Wydaeghe (South Korea) Hyundai Shell Mobis WRT; 2:09:46.0
- Sunday Accumulated leader: (Japan) Takamoto Katsuta (Republic of Ireland) Aaron Johnston (Japan) Toyota Gazoo Racing WRT; 30:18.9
- Power Stage winner: (France) Adrien Fourmaux (France) Alexandre Coria (United Kingdom) M-Sport Ford WRT; 8:01.7

Support category results
- WRC-2 winner: (Bulgaria) Nikolay Gryazin; Konstantin Aleksandrov (Belgium) DG Sport Compétition; 2:49:44.9
- WRC-3 winner: (Estonia) Romet Jürgenson (Estonia) Siim Oja; FIA Rally Star; 3:02:44.1
- J-WRC winner: (Estonia) Romet Jürgenson (Estonia) Siim Oja; FIA Rally Star; 3:02:44.1

The 2024 Croatia Rally was a motor racing event for rally cars held over four days from 18 to 21 April 2024. It marked the forty-eighth running of the Croatia Rally, and was the fourth round of the 2024 World Rally Championship, World Rally Championship-2 and World Rally Championship-3. The event was also the second round of the 2024 Junior World Rally Championship. The event was based in Zagreb, and was contested over twenty special stages, covering a total competitive distance of 283.28 km (176.02 mi).

Elfyn Evans and Scott Martin were the defending rally winners. Their team, Toyota Gazoo Racing WRT, were the defending manufacturer's winners. Yohan Rossel and Valentin Sarreaud were the defending rally winners in the WRC-2 category. Eamonn Kelly and Conor Mohan were the defending rally winners in the WRC-3 category and the junior championship.

Sébastien Ogier and Vincent Landais won the rally, and their team, Toyota, successfully defended their manufacturer's title. Nikolay Gryazin and Konstantin Aleksandrov won the World Rally Championship-2 category. Romet Jürgenson and Siim Oja won the World Rally Championship-3 category, as well as the junior championship.

== Background ==
=== Entry list ===
The following crews entered into the rally. The event is opened to crews competing in the World Rally Championship, its support categories, the World Rally Championship-2, World Rally Championship-3 as well as the Junior World Rally Championship, and privateer entries that are not registered to score points in any championship. Eight entered under Rally1 regulations, as were nineteen Rally2 crews in the World Rally Championship-2 and twenty-four Rally3 crew in the World Rally Championship-3. A total of eighteen crews participated in the Junior World Rally Championship.

Rally1 entries competing in the World Rally Championship
No.	Driver	Co-Driver	Entrant	Car	Championship eligibility	Tyre
8	(Estonia) Ott Tänak	(Estonia) Martin Järveoja	(South Korea) Hyundai Shell Mobis WRT	Hyundai i20 N Rally1	Driver, Co-driver, Manufacturer	P
9	(Norway) Andreas Mikkelsen	(Norway) Torstein Eriksen	(South Korea) Hyundai Shell Mobis WRT	Hyundai i20 N Rally1	Driver, Co-driver, Manufacturer	P
11	(Belgium) Thierry Neuville	(Belgium) Martijn Wydaeghe	(South Korea) Hyundai Shell Mobis WRT	Hyundai i20 N Rally1	Driver, Co-driver, Manufacturer	P
13	(Luxembourg) Grégoire Munster	(Belgium) Louis Louka	(United Kingdom) M-Sport Ford WRT	Ford Puma Rally1	Driver, Co-driver, Manufacturer	P
16	(France) Adrien Fourmaux	(France) Alexandre Coria	(United Kingdom) M-Sport Ford WRT	Ford Puma Rally1	Driver, Co-driver, Manufacturer	P
17	(France) Sébastien Ogier	(France) Vincent Landais	(Japan) Toyota Gazoo Racing WRT	Toyota GR Yaris Rally1	Driver, Co-driver, Manufacturer	P
18	(Japan) Takamoto Katsuta	(Republic of Ireland) Aaron Johnston	(Japan) Toyota Gazoo Racing WRT	Toyota GR Yaris Rally1	Driver, Co-driver, Manufacturer	P
33	(United Kingdom) Elfyn Evans	(United Kingdom) Scott Martin	(Japan) Toyota Gazoo Racing WRT	Toyota GR Yaris Rally1	Driver, Co-driver, Manufacturer	P

Rally2 entries competing in the World Rally Championship-2
No.	Driver	Co-Driver	Entrant	Car	Championship eligibility	Tyre
20	(France) Yohan Rossel	(France) Arnaud Dunand	(Belgium) DG Sport Compétition	Citroën C3 Rally2	Driver, Co-driver, Team	P
21	(Spain) Pepe López	(Spain) David Vázquez Liste	(Spain) Pepe López	Škoda Fabia RS Rally2	Challenger Driver, Challenger Co-driver	P
23	(Bulgaria) Nikolay Gryazin	Konstantin Aleksandrov (Note: Konstantin Aleksandrov is Russian, but he competes as a neutral competitor using the ANA flag as Russian national emblems were banned by the association due to the Russian invasion of Ukraine.)	(Belgium) DG Sport Compétition	Citroën C3 Rally2	Challenger Driver, Challenger Co-driver, Team	P
25	(France) Nicolas Ciamin	(France) Yannick Roche	(France) Nicolas Ciamin	Hyundai i20 N Rally2	Challenger Driver, Challenger Co-driver	P
26	(Finland) Lauri Joona	(Finland) Janni Hussi	(Finland) Lauri Joona	Škoda Fabia RS Rally2	Challenger Driver, Challenger Co-driver	P
27	(Finland) Emil Lindholm	(Finland) Reeta Hämäläinen	(Finland) Emil Lindholm	Hyundai i20 N Rally2	Driver, Co-driver	P
28	(Italy) Mauro Miele	(Italy) Luca Beltrame	(Italy) Mauro Miele	Škoda Fabia RS Rally2	Challenger/Masters Driver, Challenger Co-driver	P
29	(Republic of Ireland) Eamonn Boland	(Republic of Ireland) Michael Joseph Morrissey	(Republic of Ireland) Eamonn Boland	Ford Fiesta Rally2	Challenger/Masters Driver, Challenger/Masters Co-driver	P
30	(Japan) Yuki Yamamoto	(Finland) Marko Salminen	(Japan) Toyota Gazoo Racing WRT NG	Toyota GR Yaris Rally2	Challenger Driver, Challenger Co-driver, Team	P
31	(United Kingdom) Gus Greensmith	(Sweden) Jonas Andersson	(Germany) Toksport WRT	Škoda Fabia RS Rally2	Team	P
32	(Republic of Ireland) William Creighton	(Republic of Ireland) Liam Regan	(Republic of Ireland) Motorsport Ireland Rally Academy	Ford Fiesta Rally2	Challenger Driver, Challenger Co-driver	P
34	(Norway) Eyvind Brynildsen	(Norway) Jørn Listerud	(Germany) Toksport WRT	Škoda Fabia RS Rally2	Challenger Driver, Challenger Co-driver, Team	P
35	(Italy) Roberto Daprà	(Italy) Luca Guglielmetti	(Italy) Roberto Daprà	Škoda Fabia Rally2 evo	Challenger Driver, Challenger Co-driver	P
36	(Japan) Hikaru Kogure	(Finland) Topi Matias Luhtinen	(Japan) Toyota Gazoo Racing WRT NG	Toyota GR Yaris Rally2	Challenger Driver, Challenger Co-driver, Team	P
37	(Germany) Armin Kremer	(Germany) Ella Kremer	(Germany) Armin Kremer	Škoda Fabia RS Rally2	Challenger/Masters Driver, Challenger Co-driver	P
38	(Mexico) Ricardo Triviño	(Spain) Diego Fuentes Vega	(Mexico) Ricardo Triviño	Škoda Fabia RS Rally2	Challenger/Masters Driver, Challenger Co-driver	P
39	(Italy) Maurizio Chiarani	(Italy) Flavio Zanella	(Italy) Maurizio Chiarani	Škoda Fabia Rally2 evo	Challenger/Masters Driver, Challenger/Masters Co-driver	P
40	(Italy) Filippo Marchino	(Italy) Pietro Elia Ometto	(Italy) Filippo Marchino	Škoda Fabia Rally2 evo	Challenger Driver, Challenger Co-driver	P
41	(Italy) Enrico Brazzoli	(Italy) Martina Musiari	(Italy) Enrico Brazzoli	Škoda Fabia Rally2 evo	Challenger/Masters Driver, Challenger Co-driver	P
43	(Netherlands) Henk Vossen	(Netherlands) Wim Stupers	(Netherlands) Henk Vossen	Hyundai i20 N Rally2	Challenger/Masters Driver, Challenger Co-driver	P

Rally3 entries competing in the World Rally Championship-3 and/or the Junior World Rally Championship
No.	Driver	Co-Driver	Entrant	Car	Class eligibility	Tyre
44	(France) Mattéo Chatillon	(France) Maxence Cornuau	(France) Mattéo Chatillon	Renault Clio Rally3	WRC-3	P
45	(Czech Republic) Filip Kohn	(United Kingdom) Tom Woodburn	(Czech Republic) Filip Kohn	Ford Fiesta Rally3	WRC-3	P
46	(Croatia) Viliam Prodan	(Croatia) Marko Stiperski	(Croatia) Viliam Prodan	Ford Fiesta Rally3	WRC-3	P
47	(Croatia) Jan Pokos	(Slovakia) Viljem Ošlaj	(Croatia) Jan Pokos	Ford Fiesta Rally3	WRC-3	P
48	(France) Tristan Charpentier	(France) Florian Barral	(France) Tristan Charpentier	Ford Fiesta Rally3	WRC-3	P
49	(Croatia) Slaven Šekuljica	(Croatia) Damir Petrović	(Croatia) Slaven Šekuljica	Ford Fiesta Rally3	WRC-3	P
50	(Estonia) Romet Jürgenson	(Estonia) Siim Oja	FIA Rally Star	Ford Fiesta Rally3	WRC-3, Junior WRC	P
51	(Republic of Ireland) Eamonn Kelly	(Republic of Ireland) Conor Mohan	(Republic of Ireland) Motorsport Ireland Rally Academy	Ford Fiesta Rally3	WRC-3, Junior WRC	P
52	(Spain) Raúl Hernández	(Spain) José Murado González	(Spain) Raúl Hernández	Ford Fiesta Rally3	WRC-3, Junior WRC	P
53	(Belgium) Tom Rensonnet	(France) Manon Deliot	(Belgium) RACB National Team	Ford Fiesta Rally3	WRC-3, Junior WRC	P
54	(Paraguay) Diego Dominguez Jr.	(Spain) Rogelio Peñate	(Paraguay) Diego Dominguez Jr.	Ford Fiesta Rally3	WRC-3, Junior WRC	P
55	(Kazakhstan) Petr Borodin	(Kazakhstan) Roman Cheprasov	(Kazakhstan) ASP Racing	Ford Fiesta Rally3	WRC-3, Junior WRC	P
56	(Australia) Taylor Gill	(Australia) Daniel Brkic	FIA Rally Star	Ford Fiesta Rally3	WRC-3, Junior WRC	P
57	(Romania) Norbert Maior	(Romania) Francesca Maria Maior	(Romania) Norbert Maior	Ford Fiesta Rally3	WRC-3, Junior WRC	P
58	(South Africa) Max Smart	(United Kingdom) Cameron Fair	FIA Rally Star	Ford Fiesta Rally3	WRC-3, Junior WRC	P
59	(Poland) Jakub Matulka	(Poland) Daniel Dymurski	(Poland) Jakub Matulka	Ford Fiesta Rally3	WRC-3, Junior WRC	P
60	(Oman) Abdullah Al-Rawahi	(Jordan) Ata Al-Hmoud	(Oman) Abdullah Al-Rawahi	Ford Fiesta Rally3	Junior WRC	P
61	(Peru) Andre Martinez	(Peru) Guillermo Sierra Ovalle	(Peru) Andre Martinez	Ford Fiesta Rally3	Junior WRC	P
62	(Spain) Roberto Blach Núñez	(Spain) Mauro Barreiro	(Spain) Roberto Blach Núñez	Ford Fiesta Rally3	WRC-3, Junior WRC	P
63	(Bolivia) Nataniel Bruun	(Argentina) Pablo Olmos	(Bolivia) Nataniel Bruun	Ford Fiesta Rally3	WRC-3, Junior WRC	P
64	(Germany) Fabio Schwarz	(Austria) Bernhard Ettel	(Germany) Armin Schwarz Driving Experience	Ford Fiesta Rally3	WRC-3, Junior WRC	P
65	(Peru) Jose Abito Caparo	(Spain) Esther Gutiérrez Porras	FIA Rally Star	Ford Fiesta Rally3	WRC-3, Junior WRC	P
66	(Bolivia) Bruno Bulacia	(Brazil) Gabriel Morales	(Bolivia) Bruno Bulacia	Ford Fiesta Rally3	Junior WRC	P
67	(Turkey) Ali Türkkan	(Turkey) Burak Erdener	(Turkey) Castrol Ford Team Türkiye	Ford Fiesta Rally3	WRC-3, Junior WRC	P

Other major entries
No.	Driver	Co-Driver	Entrant	Car	Championship eligibility	Tyre
22	(Finland) Sami Pajari	(Finland) Enni Mälkönen	(Finland) Printsport	Toyota GR Yaris Rally2	—N/a	P
24	(Estonia) Georg Linnamäe	(United Kingdom) James Morgan	(Estonia) Georg Linnamäe	Toyota GR Yaris Rally2	—N/a	P
71	(Turkey) Uğur Soylu	(Turkey) Sener Guray	(Turkey) Uğur Soylu	Ford Fiesta Rally3	Masters Driver	P

=== Itinerary ===
All dates and times are CEST (UTC+2).

Date	No.	Time span	Stage name	Distance
18 April	—	After 16:01	Okić [Shakedown]	3.65 km
18 April		After 18:30	Opening ceremony, National and University Library in Zagreb	—N/a
19 April	SS1	After 8:28	Krašić – Sošice 1	23.63 km
19 April	SS2	After 9:41	Jaškovo – Mali Modruš Potok 1	9.48 km
19 April	SS3	After 10:39	Ravna Gora – Skrad 1	10.13 km
19 April	SS4	After 11:47	Platak 1	16.63 km
19 April		12:27 – 13:42	Regroup, Rijeka	—N/a
19 April		14:02 – 14:17	Tyre fitting zone, Cernik	—N/a
19 April	SS5	After 14:45	Platak 2	16.63 km
19 April	SS6	After 15:58	Ravna Gora – Skrad 2	10.13 km
19 April	SS7	After 17:16	Jaškovo – Mali Modruš Potok 2	9.48 km
19 April	SS8	After 18:09	Krašić – Sošice 2	23.63 km
19 April		19:54 – 20:39	Flexi service A, Westgate Shopping City	—N/a
20 April		6:28 – 6:43	Service B, Westgate Shopping City	—N/a
20 April	SS9	After 7:31	Smerovišće – Grdanjci 1	15.72 km
20 April	SS10	After 8:24	Stojdraga – Gornja Vas 1	20.77 km
20 April	SS11	After 10:05	Vinski Vrh – Duga Resa 1	8.78 km
20 April	SS12	After 11:03	Pećurkovo Brdo – Mrežnički Novaki 1	9.11 km
20 April		13:03 – 13:43	Service C, Westgate Shopping City	—N/a
20 April	SS13	After 14:31	Smerovišće – Grdanjci 2	15.72 km
20 April	SS14	After 15:24	Stojdraga – Gornja Vas 2	20.77 km
20 April	SS15	After 17:05	Vinski Vrh – Duga Resa 2	8.78 km
20 April	SS16	After 18:03	Pećurkovo Brdo – Mrežnički Novaki 2	9.11 km
20 April		19:43 – 20:28	Flexi service D, Westgate Shopping City	—N/a
21 April		5:40 – 5:55	Service E, Westgate Shopping City	—N/a
21 April	SS17	After 7:08	Trakošćan – Vrbno 1	13.15 km
21 April	SS18	After 8:35	Zagorska Sela – Kumrovec 1	14.24 km
21 April	SS19	After 10:23	Trakošćan – Vrbno 2	13.15 km
21 April		11:58 – 12:59	Regroup, Kumrovec	—N/a
21 April	SS20	After 13:15	Zagorska Sela – Kumrovec 2 [Power Stage]	14.24 km
21 April		After 15:15	Finish, INA	—N/a
21 April		After 16:00	Podium ceremony, INA	—N/a

== Report ==
=== WRC Rally1 ===
==== Classification ====
Position		No.	Driver	Co-driver	Entrant	Car	Time	Difference	Points			
Class	Event	No.	Driver	Co-driver	Entrant	Car	Time	Difference	SAT	SUN	WPS	Total
1	1	17	Sébastien Ogier	Vincent Landais	Toyota Gazoo Racing WRT	Toyota GR Yaris Rally1	2:40:23.6	0.0	13	5	3	21
2	2	33	Elfyn Evans	Scott Martin	Toyota Gazoo Racing WRT	Toyota GR Yaris Rally1	2:40:33.3	+9.7	15	3	1	19
3	3	11	Thierry Neuville	Martijn Wydaeghe	Hyundai Shell Mobis WRT	Hyundai i20 N Rally1	2:41:09.4	+45.8	18	1	0	19
4	4	8	Ott Tänak	Martin Järveoja	Hyundai Shell Mobis WRT	Hyundai i20 N Rally1	2:41:22.2	+58.6	10	6	4	20
5	5	18	Takamoto Katsuta	Aaron Johnston	Toyota Gazoo Racing WRT	Toyota GR Yaris Rally1	2:42:19.1	+1:55.5	6	7	2	15
6	6	9	Andreas Mikkelsen	Torstein Eriksen	Hyundai Shell Mobis WRT	Hyundai i20 N Rally1	2:44:24.6	+4:01.0	4	4	0	8
7	7	13	Grégoire Munster	Louis Louka	M-Sport Ford WRT	Ford Puma Rally1	2:45:34.6	+5:11.0	3	2	0	5
8	17	16	Adrien Fourmaux	Alexandre Coria	M-Sport Ford WRT	Ford Puma Rally1	2:57:28.4	+17:04.8	8	0	5	13

==== Special stages ====
Stage	Winners	Car	Time	Class leaders
SD	Ogier / Landais	Toyota GR Yaris Rally1	1:55.7	—N/a
SS1	Neuville / Wydaeghe	Hyundai i20 N Rally1	12:42.3	Neuville / Wydaeghe
SS2	Evans / Martin	Toyota GR Yaris Rally1	5:05.5	Neuville / Wydaeghe
SS3	Neuville / Wydaeghe	Hyundai i20 N Rally1	5:49.6	Neuville / Wydaeghe
SS4	Neuville / Wydaeghe	Hyundai i20 N Rally1	8:47.5	Neuville / Wydaeghe
SS5	Neuville / Wydaeghe	Hyundai i20 N Rally1	8:47.4	Neuville / Wydaeghe
SS6	Evans / Martin	Toyota GR Yaris Rally1	5:50.3	Neuville / Wydaeghe
SS7	Ogier / Landais	Toyota GR Yaris Rally1	5:00.3	Evans / Martin
SS8	Ogier / Landais	Toyota GR Yaris Rally1	12:49.8	Neuville / Wydaeghe; Evans / Martin
SS9	Fourmaux / Coria	Ford Puma Rally1	10:18.6	Neuville / Wydaeghe
SS10	Ogier / Landais	Toyota GR Yaris Rally1	12:29.6	Neuville / Wydaeghe
SS11	Neuville / Wydaeghe	Hyundai i20 N Rally1	4:31.9	Neuville / Wydaeghe
SS12	Neuville / Wydaeghe	Hyundai i20 N Rally1	4:47.5	Neuville / Wydaeghe
SS13	Evans / Martin	Toyota GR Yaris Rally1	10:27.7	Evans / Martin
SS14	Neuville / Wydaeghe	Hyundai i20 N Rally1	12:28.9	Neuville / Wydaeghe
SS15	Neuville / Wydaeghe	Hyundai i20 N Rally1	4:31.8	Neuville / Wydaeghe
SS16	Neuville / Wydaeghe	Hyundai i20 N Rally1	4:47.2	Neuville / Wydaeghe
SS17	Katsuta / Johnston	Toyota GR Yaris Rally1	6:55.9	Neuville / Wydaeghe
SS18	Tänak / Järveoja	Hyundai i20 N Rally1	8:11.9	Ogier / Landais
SS19	Katsuta / Johnston	Toyota GR Yaris Rally1	7:01.6	Ogier / Landais
SS20	Fourmaux / Coria	Ford Puma Rally1	8:01.7	Ogier / Landais

==== Championship standings ====
Pos.	Drivers' championships			Co-drivers' championships			Manufacturers' championships		
Pos.	Move	Driver	Points	Move	Co-driver	Points	Move	Manufacturer	Points
1		Thierry Neuville	86		Martijn Wydaeghe	86		Toyota Gazoo Racing WRT	176
2		Elfyn Evans	80		Scott Martin	80		Hyundai Shell Mobis WRT	169
3		Adrien Fourmaux	59		Alexandre Coria	59		M-Sport Ford WRT	96
4		Ott Tänak	53		Martin Järveoja	53			
5	2	Sébastien Ogier	45	2	Vincent Landais	45			

=== WRC-2 Rally2 ===
==== Classification ====
Position		No.	Driver	Co-driver	Entrant	Car	Time	Difference	Points	
Event	Class	No.	Driver	Co-driver	Entrant	Car	Time	Difference	Class	Event
8	1	23	Nikolay Gryazin	Konstantin Aleksandrov	DG Sport Compétition	Citroën C3 Rally2	2:49:44.9	0.0	25	2
9	2	20	Yohan Rossel	Arnaud Dunand	DG Sport Compétition	Citroën C3 Rally2	2:50:23.1	+38.2	18	1
12	3	21	Pepe López	David Vázquez Liste	Pepe López	Škoda Fabia RS Rally2	2:52:25.9	+2:41.0	15	0
13	4	25	Nicolas Ciamin	Yannick Roche	Nicolas Ciamin	Hyundai i20 N Rally2	2:52:45.6	+3:00.7	12	0
14	5	34	Eyvind Brynildsen	Jørn Listerud	Toksport WRT	Škoda Fabia RS Rally2	2:55:09.2	+5:24.3	10	0
15	6	26	Lauri Joona	Janni Hussi	Lauri Joona	Škoda Fabia RS Rally2	2:56:16.6	+6:31.7	8	0
16	7	35	Roberto Daprà	Luca Guglielmetti	Roberto Daprà	Škoda Fabia Rally2 evo	2:57:09.7	+7:24.8	6	0
18	8	27	Emil Lindholm	Reeta Hämäläinen	Emil Lindholm	Hyundai i20 N Rally2	2:58:44.8	+8:59.9	4	0
19	9	37	Armin Kremer	Ella Kremer	Armin Kremer	Škoda Fabia RS Rally2	3:01:58.7	+12:13.8	2	0
26	10	32	William Creighton	Liam Regan	Motorsport Ireland Rally Academy	Ford Fiesta Rally2	3:07:43.6	+17:58.7	1	0
29	11	30	Yuki Yamamoto	Marko Salminen	Toyota Gazoo Racing WRT NG	Toyota GR Yaris Rally2	3:12:21.7	+22:36.8	0	0
30	12	36	Hikaru Kogure	Topi Matias Luhtinen	Toyota Gazoo Racing WRT NG	Toyota GR Yaris Rally2	3:13:32.3	+23:47.4	0	0
31	13	28	Mauro Miele	Luca Beltrame	Mauro Miele	Škoda Fabia RS Rally2	3:13:36.2	+23:51.3	0	0
34	14	38	Ricardo Triviño	Diego Fuentes Vega	Ricardo Triviño	Škoda Fabia RS Rally2	3:13:50.3	+26:05.4	0	0
38	15	41	Enrico Brazzoli	Martina Musiari	Enrico Brazzoli	Škoda Fabia Rally2 evo	3:18:51.3	+29:06.4	0	0
43	16	40	Filippo Marchino	Pietro Elia Ometto	Filippo Marchino	Škoda Fabia Rally2 evo	3:29:15.0	+39:30.1	0	0
49	17	43	Henk Vossen	Wim Stupers	Henk Vossen	Hyundai i20 N Rally2	3:53:10.7	+1:03:25.8	0	0
56	18	39	Maurizio Chiarani	Flavio Zanella	Maurizio Chiarani	Škoda Fabia Rally2 evo	4:14:43.6	+1:24:58.7	0	0
Retired SS6		29	Eamonn Boland	Michael Joseph Morrissey	Eamonn Boland	Ford Fiesta Rally2	Accident		0	0

==== Special stages ====
Overall
Stage	Winners	Car	Time	Class leaders
SD	Rossel / Dunand	Citroën C3 Rally2	2:02.6	—N/a
SS1	Gryazin / Aleksandrov	Citroën C3 Rally2	13:35.3	Gryazin / Aleksandrov
SS2	Gryazin / Aleksandrov	Citroën C3 Rally2	5:24.8	Gryazin / Aleksandrov
SS3	Rossel / Dunand	Citroën C3 Rally2	6:14.8	Gryazin / Aleksandrov
SS4	Gryazin / Aleksandrov	Citroën C3 Rally2	9:17.1	Gryazin / Aleksandrov
SS5	Gryazin / Aleksandrov	Citroën C3 Rally2	9:28.1	Gryazin / Aleksandrov
SS6	Gryazin / Aleksandrov	Citroën C3 Rally2	6:12.3	Gryazin / Aleksandrov
SS7	Gryazin / Aleksandrov	Citroën C3 Rally2	5:21.5	Gryazin / Aleksandrov
SS8	Gryazin / Aleksandrov	Citroën C3 Rally2	13:28.0	Gryazin / Aleksandrov
SS9	Rossel / Dunand	Citroën C3 Rally2	10:52.1	Gryazin / Aleksandrov
SS10	Rossel / Dunand	Citroën C3 Rally2	13:03.8	Gryazin / Aleksandrov
SS11	Rossel / Dunand	Citroën C3 Rally2	4:48.8	Gryazin / Aleksandrov
SS12	Gryazin / Aleksandrov	Citroën C3 Rally2	5:02.7	Gryazin / Aleksandrov
SS13	Rossel / Dunand	Citroën C3 Rally2	10:53.9	Gryazin / Aleksandrov
SS14	Rossel / Dunand	Citroën C3 Rally2	13:07.2	Gryazin / Aleksandrov
SS15	Gryazin / Aleksandrov	Citroën C3 Rally2	4:47.7	Gryazin / Aleksandrov
SS16	Gryazin / Aleksandrov	Citroën C3 Rally2	5:02.5	Gryazin / Aleksandrov
SS17	Gryazin / Aleksandrov	Citroën C3 Rally2	7:28.8	Gryazin / Aleksandrov
SS18	Rossel / Dunand	Citroën C3 Rally2	8:42.8	Gryazin / Aleksandrov
SS19	Rossel / Dunand	Citroën C3 Rally2	7:29.8	Gryazin / Aleksandrov
SS20	Rossel / Dunand	Citroën C3 Rally2	8:33.7	Gryazin / Aleksandrov

Challenger
Stage	Winners	Car	Time	Class leaders
SD	Gryazin / Aleksandrov	Citroën C3 Rally2	2:03.0	—N/a
SS1	Gryazin / Aleksandrov	Citroën C3 Rally2	13:35.3	Gryazin / Aleksandrov
SS2	Gryazin / Aleksandrov	Citroën C3 Rally2	5:24.8	Gryazin / Aleksandrov
SS3	Gryazin / Aleksandrov	Citroën C3 Rally2	6:16.5	Gryazin / Aleksandrov
SS4	Gryazin / Aleksandrov	Citroën C3 Rally2	9:17.1	Gryazin / Aleksandrov
SS5	Gryazin / Aleksandrov	Citroën C3 Rally2	9:28.1	Gryazin / Aleksandrov
SS6	Gryazin / Aleksandrov	Citroën C3 Rally2	6:12.3	Gryazin / Aleksandrov
SS7	Gryazin / Aleksandrov	Citroën C3 Rally2	5:21.5	Gryazin / Aleksandrov
SS8	Gryazin / Aleksandrov	Citroën C3 Rally2	13:28.0	Gryazin / Aleksandrov
SS9	Gryazin / Aleksandrov	Citroën C3 Rally2	10:53.7	Gryazin / Aleksandrov
SS10	Gryazin / Aleksandrov	Citroën C3 Rally2	13:10.9	Gryazin / Aleksandrov
SS11	Gryazin / Aleksandrov	Citroën C3 Rally2	4:50.0	Gryazin / Aleksandrov
SS12	Gryazin / Aleksandrov	Citroën C3 Rally2	5:02.7	Gryazin / Aleksandrov
SS13	López / Vázquez Liste	Škoda Fabia RS Rally2	11:04.1	Gryazin / Aleksandrov
SS14	Ciamin / Roche	Hyundai i20 N Rally2	13:18.8	Gryazin / Aleksandrov
SS15	Gryazin / Aleksandrov	Citroën C3 Rally2	4:47.7	Gryazin / Aleksandrov
SS16	Gryazin / Aleksandrov	Citroën C3 Rally2	5:02.5	Gryazin / Aleksandrov
SS17	Gryazin / Aleksandrov	Citroën C3 Rally2	7:28.8	Gryazin / Aleksandrov
SS18	Rossel / Dunand	Citroën C3 Rally2	8:42.8	Gryazin / Aleksandrov
SS19	Rossel / Dunand	Citroën C3 Rally2	7:29.8	Gryazin / Aleksandrov
SS20	Ciamin / Roche	Hyundai i20 N Rally2	8:34.3	Gryazin / Aleksandrov

==== Championship standings ====
Pos.	Open Drivers' championships			Open Co-drivers' championships			Teams' championships			Challenger Drivers' championships			Challenger Co-drivers' championships		
Pos.	Move	Driver	Points	Move	Co-driver	Points	Move	Manufacturer	Points	Move	Manufacturer	Points	Move	Driver	Points
1	1	Yohan Rossel	43	1	Arnaud Dunand	43		DG Sport Compétition	86		Nicolas Ciamin	48		Yannick Roche	48
2	1	Oliver Solberg	43	1	Elliott Edmondson	43	1	Toksport WRT	70		Pepe López	43		David Vázquez Liste	43
3	4	Nikolay Gryazin	40	4	Konstantin Aleksandrov	40	1	Toyota Gazoo Racing WRT NG	61	2	Nikolay Gryazin	43	2	Konstantin Aleksandrov	43
4		Nicolas Ciamin	36		Yannick Roche	36				1	Sami Pajari	25	1	Enni Mälkönen	25
5	2	Pepe López	33	2	David Vázquez Liste	33				1	Kajetan Kajetanowicz	25	1	Maciej Szczepaniak	25

=== WRC-3 Rally3 ===
==== Classification ====
Position		No.	Driver	Co-driver	Entrant	Car	Time	Difference	Points
Event	Class	No.	Driver	Co-driver	Entrant	Car	Time	Difference	Points
20	1	50	Romet Jürgenson	Siim Oja	FIA Rally Star	Ford Fiesta Rally3	3:02:44.1	0.0	25
21	2	44	Mattéo Chatillon	Maxence Cornuau	Mattéo Chatillon	Renault Clio Rally3	3:04:17.8	+1:33.7	18
22	3	45	Filip Kohn	Tom Woodburn	Filip Kohn	Ford Fiesta Rally3	3:04:38.6	+1:54.5	15
23	4	56	Taylor Gill	Daniel Brkic	FIA Rally Star	Ford Fiesta Rally3	3:05:19.2	+2:35.1	12
24	5	57	Norbert Maior	Francesca Maria Maior	Norbert Maior	Ford Fiesta Rally3	3:06:39.9	+3:55.8	10
27	6	62	Roberto Blach Núñez	Mauro Barreiro	Roberto Blach Núñez	Ford Fiesta Rally3	3:09:44.0	+6:59.9	8
28	7	46	Viliam Prodan	Marko Stiperski	Viliam Prodan	Ford Fiesta Rally3	3:11:29.3	+8:45.2	6
32	8	48	Tristan Charpentier	Florian Barral	Tristan Charpentier	Ford Fiesta Rally3	3:14:23.7	+11:39.6	4
33	9	65	Jose Abito Caparo	Esther Gutiérrez Porras	FIA Rally Star	Ford Fiesta Rally3	3:14:57.8	+12:13.7	2
37	10	58	Max Smart	Cameron Fair	FIA Rally Star	Ford Fiesta Rally3	3:18:12.5	+15:28.4	1
48	11	49	Slaven Šekuljica	Damir Petrović	Slaven Šekuljica	Ford Fiesta Rally3	3:52:57.3	+50:13.2	0
51	12	59	Jakub Matulka	Daniel Dymurski	Jakub Matulka	Ford Fiesta Rally3	3:58:25.2	+55:41.1	0
52	13	54	Diego Dominguez Jr.	Rogelio Peñate	Diego Dominguez Jr.	Ford Fiesta Rally3	4:03:00.4	+1:00:16.3	0
53	14	53	Tom Rensonnet	Manon Deliot	RACB National Team	Ford Fiesta Rally3	4:03:12.0	+1:00:27.9	0
54	15	47	Jan Pokos	Viljem Ošlaj	Jan Pokos	Ford Fiesta Rally3	4:07:25.1	+1:04:41.0	0
59	16	64	Fabio Schwarz	Bernhard Ettel	Armin Schwarz Driving Experience	Ford Fiesta Rally3	4:24:32.4	+1:21:48.3	0
60	17	52	Raúl Hernández	José Murado González	Raúl Hernández	Ford Fiesta Rally3	4:33:44.3	+1:31:00.2	0
61	18	63	Nataniel Bruun	Pablo Olmos	Nataniel Bruun	Ford Fiesta Rally3	5:33:57.3	+2:31:13.2	0
Retired SS13		55	Petr Borodin	Roman Cheprasov	Petr Borodin	Ford Fiesta Rally3	Accident		0
Retired SS10		51	Eamonn Kelly	Conor Mohan	Motorsport Ireland Rally Academy	Ford Fiesta Rally3	Withdrawn		0
Retired SS3		67	Ali Türkkan	Burak Erdener	Castrol Ford Team Türkiye	Ford Fiesta Rally3	Accident		0

==== Special stages ====
Stage	Winners	Car	Time	Class leaders
SD	Türkkan / Erdener	Ford Fiesta Rally3	2:10.9	—N/a
SS1	Türkkan / Erdener	Ford Fiesta Rally3	14:31.7	Türkkan / Erdener
SS2	Jürgenson / Oja	Ford Fiesta Rally3	5:44.8	Türkkan / Erdener
SS3	Jürgenson / Oja	Ford Fiesta Rally3	6:41.0	Jürgenson / Oja
SS4	Jürgenson / Oja	Ford Fiesta Rally3	10:02.9	Jürgenson / Oja
SS5	Kohn / Woodburn	Ford Fiesta Rally3	10:08.9	Jürgenson / Oja
SS6	Gill / Brkic	Ford Fiesta Rally3	6:42.6	Jürgenson / Oja
SS7	Maior / Maior	Ford Fiesta Rally3	5:41.5	Jürgenson / Oja
SS8	Jürgenson / Oja	Ford Fiesta Rally3	14:44.2	Jürgenson / Oja
SS9	Jürgenson / Oja	Ford Fiesta Rally3	11:37.8	Jürgenson / Oja
SS10	Rensonnet / Deliot	Ford Fiesta Rally3	13:57.7	Jürgenson / Oja
SS11	Jürgenson / Oja	Ford Fiesta Rally3	5:08.9	Jürgenson / Oja
SS12	Jürgenson / Oja	Ford Fiesta Rally3	5:26.8	Jürgenson / Oja
SS13	Dominguez Jr. / Peñate	Ford Fiesta Rally3	11:35.5	Jürgenson / Oja
SS14	Gill / Brkic	Ford Fiesta Rally3	14:00.9	Jürgenson / Oja
SS15	Kohn / Woodburn	Ford Fiesta Rally3	5:09.2	Jürgenson / Oja
SS16	Dominguez Jr. / Peñate	Ford Fiesta Rally3	5:23.8	Jürgenson / Oja
SS17	Dominguez Jr. / Peñate	Ford Fiesta Rally3	7:56.7	Jürgenson / Oja
SS18	Dominguez Jr. / Peñate	Ford Fiesta Rally3	9:16.6	Jürgenson / Oja
SS19	Chatillon / Cornuau	Renault Clio Rally3	7:52.0	Jürgenson / Oja
SS20	Chatillon / Cornuau	Renault Clio Rally3	8:58.2	Jürgenson / Oja

==== Championship standings ====
Pos.	Drivers' championships			Co-drivers' championships		
Pos.	Move	Driver	Points	Move	Co-driver	Points
1	4	Romet Jürgenson	43	4	Siim Oja	43
2	1	Jan Černý	25	1	Ondřej Krajča	25
3	1	Mille Johansson	25	1	Johan Grönvall	25
4	1	Hamza Anwar	25	1	Adnan Din	25
5	1	Ghjuvanni Rossi	18	1	Kylian Sarmezan	18

=== J-WRC Rally3 ===
==== Classification ====
Position		No.	Driver	Co-driver	Entrant	Car	Time	Difference	Points	
Event	Class	No.	Driver	Co-driver	Entrant	Car	Time	Difference	Class	Stage
20	1	50	Romet Jürgenson	Siim Oja	FIA Rally Star	Ford Fiesta Rally3	3:02:44.1	0.0	25	9
23	2	56	Taylor Gill	Daniel Brkic	FIA Rally Star	Ford Fiesta Rally3	3:05:19.2	+2:35.1	18	3
24	3	57	Norbert Maior	Francesca Maria Maior	Norbert Maior	Ford Fiesta Rally3	3:06:39.9	+3:55.8	15	1
25	4	66	Bruno Bulacia	Gabriel Morales	Bruno Bulacia	Ford Fiesta Rally3	3:07:07.5	+4:23.4	12	0
27	5	62	Roberto Blach Núñez	Mauro Barreiro	Roberto Blach Núñez	Ford Fiesta Rally3	3:09:44.0	+6:59.9	10	0
33	6	65	Jose Abito Caparo	Esther Gutiérrez Porras	FIA Rally Star	Ford Fiesta Rally3	3:14:57.8	+12:13.7	8	0
37	7	58	Max Smart	Cameron Fair	FIA Rally Star	Ford Fiesta Rally3	3:18:12.5	+15:28.4	6	0
51	8	59	Jakub Matulka	Daniel Dymurski	Jakub Matulka	Ford Fiesta Rally3	3:58:25.2	+55:41.1	4	0
52	9	54	Diego Dominguez Jr.	Rogelio Peñate	Diego Dominguez Jr.	Ford Fiesta Rally3	4:03:00.4	+1:00:16.3	2	5
53	10	53	Tom Rensonnet	Manon Deliot	RACB National Team	Ford Fiesta Rally3	4:03:12.0	+1:00:27.9	1	1
58	11	61	Andre Martinez	Guillermo Sierra Ovalle	Andre Martinez	Ford Fiesta Rally3	4:20:29.5	+1:17:45.4	0	0
59	12	64	Fabio Schwarz	Bernhard Ettel	Armin Schwarz Driving Experience	Ford Fiesta Rally3	4:24:32.4	+1:21:48.3	0	0
60	13	52	Raúl Hernández	José Murado González	Raúl Hernández	Ford Fiesta Rally3	4:33:44.3	+1:31:00.2	0	1
61	14	63	Nataniel Bruun	Pablo Olmos	Nataniel Bruun	Ford Fiesta Rally3	5:33:57.3	+2:31:13.2	0	0
Retired SS13		55	Petr Borodin	Roman Cheprasov	Petr Borodin	Ford Fiesta Rally3	Accident		0	0
Retired SS10		51	Eamonn Kelly	Conor Mohan	Motorsport Ireland Rally Academy	Ford Fiesta Rally3	Accident		0	0
Retired SS3		67	Ali Türkkan	Burak Erdener	Castrol Ford Team Türkiye	Ford Fiesta Rally3	Accident		0	1

==== Special stages ====
Stage	Winners	Car	Time	Class leaders
SD	Türkkan / Erdener	Ford Fiesta Rally3	2:10.9	—N/a
SS1	Türkkan / Erdener	Ford Fiesta Rally3	14:31.7	Türkkan / Erdener
SS2	Jürgenson / Oja	Ford Fiesta Rally3	5:44.8	Türkkan / Erdener
SS3	Jürgenson / Oja	Ford Fiesta Rally3	6:41.0	Jürgenson / Oja
SS4	Jürgenson / Oja	Ford Fiesta Rally3	10:02.9	Jürgenson / Oja
SS5	Jürgenson / Oja	Ford Fiesta Rally3	10:09.3	Jürgenson / Oja
SS5	Gill / Brkic	Ford Fiesta Rally3	10:09.3	Jürgenson / Oja
SS6	Gill / Brkic	Ford Fiesta Rally3	6:42.6	Jürgenson / Oja
SS7	Maior / Maior	Ford Fiesta Rally3	5:41.5	Jürgenson / Oja
SS8	Jürgenson / Oja	Ford Fiesta Rally3	14:44.2	Jürgenson / Oja
SS9	Jürgenson / Oja	Ford Fiesta Rally3	11:37.8	Jürgenson / Oja
SS10	Rensonnet / Deliot	Ford Fiesta Rally3	13:57.7	Jürgenson / Oja
SS11	Jürgenson / Oja	Ford Fiesta Rally3	5:08.9	Jürgenson / Oja
SS12	Jürgenson / Oja	Ford Fiesta Rally3	5:26.8	Jürgenson / Oja
SS13	Domínguez Jr. / Peñate	Ford Fiesta Rally3	11:35.5	Jürgenson / Oja
SS14	Gill / Brkic	Ford Fiesta Rally3	14:00.9	Jürgenson / Oja
SS15	Jürgenson / Oja	Ford Fiesta Rally3	5:10.1	Jürgenson / Oja
SS16	Dominguez Jr. / Peñate	Ford Fiesta Rally3	5:23.8	Jürgenson / Oja
SS17	Dominguez Jr. / Peñate	Ford Fiesta Rally3	7:56.7	Jürgenson / Oja
SS18	Dominguez Jr. / Peñate	Ford Fiesta Rally3	9:16.6	Jürgenson / Oja
SS19	Hernández / Murado	Ford Fiesta Rally3	7:53.1	Jürgenson / Oja
SS20	Dominguez Jr. / Peñate	Ford Fiesta Rally3	8:58.3	Jürgenson / Oja

==== Championship standings ====
Pos.	Drivers' championships			Co-drivers' championships		
Pos.	Move	Driver	Points	Move	Co-driver	Points
1	1	Romet Jürgenson	55	1	Siim Oja	55
2	1	Mille Johansson	33	1	Johan Grönvall	33
3	5	Taylor Gill	25	5	Daniel Brkic	25
4	5	Norbert Maior	19	5	Francesca Maior	19
5	2	Eamonn Kelly	15	2	Conor Mohan	15

== Notes ==
Previous rally: 2024 Safari Rally	2024 FIA World Rally Championship	Next rally: 2024 Rally de Portugal
Previous rally: 2023 Croatia Rally	2024 Croatia Rally	Next rally: 2025 Croatia Rally
