= 2023 Rally Estonia =

13th edition of Rally Estonia

2023 Rally Estonia WRC Rally Estonia 2023
Round 8 of 13 in the 2023 World Rally Championship
| ← Previous event | Next event → |
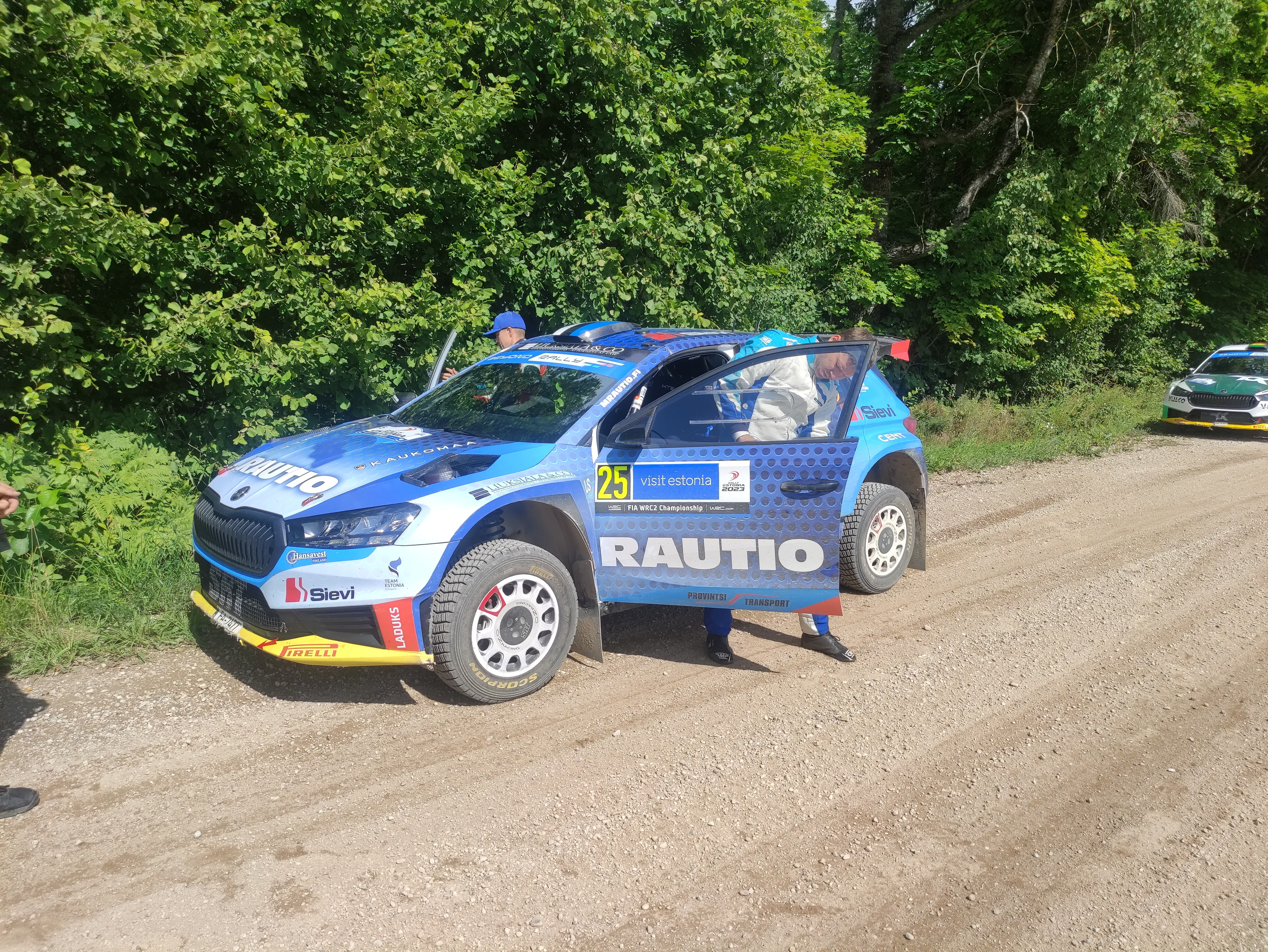
- Rally Estonia is the biggest motorsport event in the Baltic states.
- Host country: Estonia
- Rally base: Tartu, Tartu County
- Dates run: 20 – 23 July 2023
- Start location: Tartu, Tartu County
- Finish location: Leigo Lakes
- Stages: 21 (300.42 km; 186.67 miles)
- Stage surface: Gravel
- Transport distance: 1,064.42 km (661.40 miles)
- Overall distance: 1,364.84 km (848.07 miles)

Statistics
- Crews registered: 53
- Crews: 50 at start, 44 at finish

Overall results
- Overall winner: (Finland) Kalle Rovanperä (Finland) Jonne Halttunen (Japan) Toyota Gazoo Racing WRT; 2:36:03.2
- Power Stage winner: (Finland) Kalle Rovanperä (Finland) Jonne Halttunen (Japan) Toyota Gazoo Racing WRT; 2:36:03.2

Support category results
- WRC-2 winner: (Norway) Andreas Mikkelsen (Norway) Torstein Eriksen (Germany) Toksport WRT 3; 2:45:57.3
- WRC-3 winner: (Finland) Roope Korhonen (Finland) Anssi Viinikka (Finland) Rautio Motorsport; 2:57:16.2
- J-WRC winner: (Luxembourg) Grégoire Munster (Belgium) Louis Louka (Belgium) Louis Louka

The 2023 Rally Estonia (also known as the WRC Rally Estonia 2023) was a motor racing event for rally cars held from 20 July to 23 July 2023. It marked the thirteenth running of the Rally Estonia, and was the eighth round of the 2023 World Rally Championship, World Rally Championship-2 and World Rally Championship-3. The event was also the fourth round of the 2023 Junior World Rally Championship. The event was based in Tartu of Tartu County, and was contested over twenty-one special stages covering a total competitive distance of 300.42 km (186.67 mi).

Kalle Rovanperä and Jonne Halttunen were the defending rally winners. Their team, Toyota Gazoo Racing WRT, were the defending manufacturers' winners. Andreas Mikkelsen and Torstein Eriksen were the defending rally winners in the WRC-2 category. Sami Pajari and Enni Mälkönen were the defending rally winners in the WRC-3 category as well as the junior championship.

Rovanperä and Halttunen successfully defended their titles, so as their team, Toyota. Mikkelsen and Eriksen defended their titles in the World Rally Championship-2 category. Roope Korhonen and Anssi Viinikka won the World Rally Championship-3 category. Grégoire Munster and Grégoire Munster won the junior class.

== Background ==
=== Entry list ===
The following crews entered into the rally. The event was opened to crews competing in the World Rally Championship, its support categories, the World Rally Championship-2, World Rally Championship-3, Junior World Rally Championship and privateer entries that are not registered to score points in any championship. Eight entered under Rally1 regulations, as were twenty-four Rally2 crews in the World Rally Championship-2 and eleven Rally3 crews in the World Rally Championship-3. A total of eight crews registered to participate in the Junior World Rally Championship.

Rally1 entries competing in the World Rally Championship
| No. | Driver | Co-Driver | Entrant | Car | Championship eligibility | Tyre |
|---|---|---|---|---|---|---|
| 3 | (Finland) Teemu Suninen | (Finland) Mikko Markkula | (South Korea) Hyundai Shell Mobis WRT | Hyundai i20 N Rally1 | Driver, Co-driver, Manufacturer | P |
| 4 | (Finland) Esapekka Lappi | (Finland) Janne Ferm | (South Korea) Hyundai Shell Mobis WRT | Hyundai i20 N Rally1 | Driver, Co-driver, Manufacturer | P |
| 7 | (France) Pierre-Louis Loubet | (Belgium) Nicolas Gilsoul | (United Kingdom) M-Sport Ford WRT | Ford Puma Rally1 | Driver, Co-driver, Manufacturer | P |
| 8 | (Estonia) Ott Tänak | (Estonia) Martin Järveoja | (United Kingdom) M-Sport Ford WRT | Ford Puma Rally1 | Driver, Co-driver, Manufacturer | P |
| 11 | (Belgium) Thierry Neuville | (Belgium) Martijn Wydaeghe | (South Korea) Hyundai Shell Mobis WRT | Hyundai i20 N Rally1 | Driver, Co-driver, Manufacturer | P |
| 18 | (Japan) Takamoto Katsuta | (Republic of Ireland) Aaron Johnston | (Japan) Toyota Gazoo Racing WRT | Toyota GR Yaris Rally1 | Driver, Co-driver, Manufacturer | P |
| 33 | (United Kingdom) Elfyn Evans | (United Kingdom) Scott Martin | (Japan) Toyota Gazoo Racing WRT | Toyota GR Yaris Rally1 | Driver, Co-driver, Manufacturer | P |
| 69 | (Finland) Kalle Rovanperä | (Finland) Jonne Halttunen | (Japan) Toyota Gazoo Racing WRT | Toyota GR Yaris Rally1 | Driver, Co-driver, Manufacturer | P |

Rally2 entries competing in the World Rally Championship-2
| No. | Driver | Co-Driver | Entrant | Car | Championship eligibility | Tyre |
|---|---|---|---|---|---|---|
| 20 | (Sweden) Oliver Solberg | (United Kingdom) Elliott Edmondson | (Sweden) Oliver Solberg | Škoda Fabia RS Rally2 | Driver, Co-driver | P |
| 21 | (United Kingdom) Gus Greensmith | (Sweden) Jonas Andersson | (Germany) Toksport WRT 3 | Škoda Fabia RS Rally2 | Team | P |
| 22 | (Finland) Emil Lindholm | (Finland) Reeta Hämäläinen | (South Korea) Hyundai Motorsport N | Hyundai i20 N Rally2 | Driver, Co-driver, Team | P |
| 23 | (Norway) Andreas Mikkelsen | (Norway) Torstein Eriksen | (Germany) Toksport WRT 3 | Škoda Fabia RS Rally2 | Driver, Co-driver, Team | P |
| 24 | (Finland) Sami Pajari | (Finland) Enni Mälkönen | (Germany) Toksport WRT | Škoda Fabia RS Rally2 | Challenger Driver, Challenger Co-driver, Team | P |
| 25 | (Estonia) Egon Kaur | (Estonia) Jakko Viilo | (Estonia) Egon Kaur | Škoda Fabia RS Rally2 | Challenger Driver, Challenger Co-driver | P |
| 26 | (Estonia) Robert Virves | (United Kingdom) Craig Drew | (Estonia) Robert Virves | Ford Fiesta Rally2 | Challenger Driver, Challenger Co-driver | P |
| 27 | (Bolivia) Marco Bulacia | (Spain) Diego Vallejo | (Germany) Toksport WRT | Škoda Fabia RS Rally2 | Challenger Driver, Challenger Co-driver, Team | P |
| 28 | (Estonia) Georg Linnamäe | (United Kingdom) James Morgan | (Estonia) Georg Linnamäe | Hyundai i20 N Rally2 | Challenger Driver, Challenger Co-driver | P |
| 29 | (Poland) Mikołaj Marczyk | (Poland) Szymon Gospodarczyk | (Poland) Mikołaj Marczyk | Škoda Fabia RS Rally2 | Challenger Driver, Challenger Co-driver | P |
| 30 | (Paraguay) Fabrizio Zaldivar | (Argentina) Marcelo Der Ohannesian | (South Korea) Hyundai Motorsport N | Hyundai i20 N Rally2 | Challenger Driver, Challenger Co-driver, Team | P |
| 31 | (Republic of Ireland) Josh McErlean | (Republic of Ireland) James Fulton | (Republic of Ireland) Motorsport Ireland Rally Academy | Hyundai i20 N Rally2 | Challenger Driver, Challenger Co-driver | P |
| 32 | (Spain) Alejandro Cachón | (Spain) Alejandro López | (Spain) Alejandro Cachón | Citroën C3 Rally2 | Challenger Driver, Challenger Co-driver | —N/a |
| 34 | (Chile) Jorge Martínez Fontena | (Argentina) Alberto Alvarez Nicholson | (Chile) Jorge Martínez Fontena | Škoda Fabia Rally2 evo | Challenger Driver, Challenger Co-driver | P |
| 35 | (Bolivia) Bruno Bulacia | (Spain) Axel Coronado | (Bolivia) Bruno Bulacia | Škoda Fabia RS Rally2 | Challenger Driver, Challenger Co-driver | P |
| 36 | (Chile) Emilio Fernández | (Spain) Borja Rozada | (Chile) Emilio Fernández | Škoda Fabia Rally2 evo | Challenger Driver, Challenger Co-driver | P |
| 37 | (Estonia) Priit Koik | (Estonia) Kristo Tamm | (Estonia) Priit Koik | Škoda Fabia Rally2 evo | Challenger Driver, Challenger Co-driver | P |
| 38 | (Estonia) Kaspar Kasari | (Estonia) Rainis Raidma | (Estonia) Kaspar Kasari | Škoda Fabia R5 | Challenger Driver, Challenger Co-driver | P |
| 39 | (Spain) Alexander Villanueva | (Spain) José Murado González | (Spain) Alexander Villanueva | Škoda Fabia RS Rally2 | Challenger/Masters Driver, Challenger Co-driver | P |
| 40 | (Germany) Armin Kremer | (Germany) Ella Kremer | (Germany) Armin Kremer | Škoda Fabia RS Rally2 | Challenger/Masters Driver, Challenger Co-driver | P |
| 41 | (Italy) Mauro Miele | (Italy) Luca Beltrame | (Italy) Mauro Miele | Škoda Fabia RS Rally2 | Challenger/Masters Driver, Challenger Co-driver | P |
| 44 | (Paraguay) Miguel Zaldivar Sr. | (Argentina) José Luis Díaz | (Paraguay) Miguel Zaldivar Sr. | Hyundai i20 N Rally2 | Challenger/Masters Driver, Challenger Co-driver | —N/a |
| 45 | (Italy) Luciano Cobbe | (Italy) Roberto Mometti | (Italy) Luciano Cobbe | Škoda Fabia Rally2 evo | Challenger/Masters Driver, Challenger/Masters Co-driver | P |
| 46 | (Qatar) Nasser Khalifa Al-Attiyah | (Italy) Giovanni Bernacchini | (Qatar) Nasser Khalifa Al-Attiyah | Ford Fiesta Rally2 | Challenger/Masters Driver, Challenger Co-driver | —N/a |

Rally3 entries competing in the World Rally Championship-3 and/or the Junior World Rally Championship
| No. | Driver | Co-Driver | Entrant | Car | Class eligibility | Tyre |
|---|---|---|---|---|---|---|
| 47 | (Finland) Roope Korhonen | (Finland) Anssi Viinikka | (Finland) Rautio Motorsport | Ford Fiesta Rally3 | WRC-3 | P |
| 48 | (Finland) Toni Herranen | (Finland) Mikko Lukka | (Finland) Toni Herranen | Ford Fiesta Rally3 | WRC-3 | P |
| 49 | (Turkey) Ali Türkkan | (Turkey) Burak Erdener | (Turkey) Castrol Ford Team Türkiye | Ford Fiesta Rally3 | WRC-3 | P |
| 50 | (Finland) Benjamin Korhola | (Finland) Pekka Kelander | (Finland) Rautio Motorsport | Ford Fiesta Rally3 | WRC-3 | P |
| 51 | (Republic of Ireland) Brendan Cumiskey | (Republic of Ireland) Arthur Kierans | (Republic of Ireland) Brendan Cumiskey | Ford Fiesta Rally3 | WRC-3 | P |
| 52 | (Republic of Ireland) William Creighton | (Republic of Ireland) Liam Regan | (Republic of Ireland) Motorsport Ireland Rally Academy | Ford Fiesta Rally3 | WRC-3, Junior WRC | P |
| 53 | (Paraguay) Diego Dominguez Jr | (Spain) Rogelio Peñate | (Paraguay) Diego Dominguez Jr | Ford Fiesta Rally3 | Junior WRC | P |
| 54 | (France) Laurent Pellier | (France) Kévin Bronner | (France) Laurent Pellier | Ford Fiesta Rally3 | WRC-3, Junior WRC | P |
| 55 | (Spain) Roberto Blach Núñez | (Spain) Mauro Barreiro | (Spain) Roberto Blach Núñez | Ford Fiesta Rally3 | WRC-3, Junior WRC | P |
| 56 | (Belgium) Tom Rensonnet | (Belgium) Loïc Dumont | (Belgium) RACB National Team | Ford Fiesta Rally3 | WRC-3, Junior WRC | P |
| 57 | (Republic of Ireland) Eamonn Kelly | (Republic of Ireland) Conor Mohan | (Republic of Ireland) Motorsport Ireland Rally Academy | Ford Fiesta Rally3 | WRC-3, Junior WRC | P |
| 58 | (Luxembourg) Grégoire Munster | (Belgium) Louis Louka | (Luxembourg) Grégoire Munster | Ford Fiesta Rally3 | Junior WRC | P |
| 59 | (Kenya) Hamza Anwar | (United States) Alexander Kihurani | (Kenya) Hamza Anwar | Ford Fiesta Rally3 | WRC-3, Junior WRC | P |

=== Itinerary ===
All dates and times are EEST (UTC+3).

| Date | No. | Time span | Stage name | Distance |
|---|---|---|---|---|
| 20 July | — | After 9:01 | Kastre [Shakedown] | 4.08 km |
| 20 July | | After 18:30 | Opening ceremony, Tartu | —N/a |
| 20 July | SS1 | After 20:05 | Tartu 1 | 3.35 km |
| 20 July | | 20:23 – 20:38 | Flexi service A, Raadi | —N/a |
| 21 July | SS2 | After 9:08 | Peipsiääre 1 | 24.35 km |
| 21 July | SS3 | After 10:01 | Mustvee 1 | 17.09 km |
| 21 July | SS4 | After 11:44 | Raanitsa 1 | 21.45 km |
| 21 July | | 12:54 – 13:04 | Regroup, Raadi | —N/a |
| 21 July | | 13:04 – 13:44 | Service B, Raadi | —N/a |
| 21 July | SS5 | After 14:42 | Peipsiääre 2 | 24.35 km |
| 21 July | SS6 | After 15:35 | Mustvee 2 | 17.09 km |
| 21 July | SS7 | After 17:18 | Raanitsa 2 | 21.45 km |
| 21 July | SS8 | After 18:21 | Neeruti | 7.60 km |
| 21 July | | 19:31 – 19:41 | Regroup, Raadi | —N/a |
| 21 July | | 19:41 – 20:26 | Flexi service C, Raadi | —N/a |
| 22 July | SS9 | After 8:09 | Mäeküla 1 | 10.27 km |
| 22 July | SS10 | After 9:02 | Otepää 1 | 11.15 km |
| 22 July | | 9:37 – 10:17 | Regroup, Kanepi | —N/a |
| 22 July | SS11 | After 11:10 | Mäeküla 2 | 10.27 km |
| 22 July | SS12 | After 12:03 | Otepää 2 | 11.15 km |
| 22 July | | 13:18 – 13:28 | Regroup, Raadi | —N/a |
| 22 July | | 13:28 – 14:08 | Service D, Raadi | —N/a |
| 22 July | SS13 | After 14:56 | Elva 1 | 11.73 km |
| 22 July | SS14 | After 16:05 | Kanepi 1 | 16.48 km |
| 22 July | | 16:35 – 17:05 | Regroup, Kanepi | —N/a |
| 22 July | SS15 | After 17:56 | Elva 2 | 11.73 km |
| 22 July | SS16 | After 19:05 | Kanepi 2 | 16.48 km |
| 22 July | SS17 | After 20:24 | Tartu 2 | 3.35 km |
| 22 July | | 20:46 – 21:31 | Flexi service E, Raadi | —N/a |
| 23 July | SS18 | After 8:09 | Karaski 1 | 12.04 km |
| 23 July | SS19 | After 9:05 | Kambja 1 | 18.50 km |
| 23 July | | 10:00 – 10:33 | Regroup, Kanepi | —N/a |
| 23 July | SS20 | After 11:01 | Karaski 2 | 12.04 km |
| 23 July | | 11:26 – 12:42 | Regroup, Kanepi | —N/a |
| 23 July | SS21 | After 13:05 | Kambja 2 [Power Stage] | 18.50 km |
| 23 July | | After 16:30 | Podium ceremony, Tartu | —N/a |

== Report ==
=== WRC Rally1 ===
==== Classification ====
| Position | | No. | Driver | Co-driver | Entrant | Car | Time | Difference | Points | |
| Event | Class | No. | Driver | Co-driver | Entrant | Car | Time | Difference | Event | Stage |
|---|---|---|---|---|---|---|---|---|---|---|
| 1 | 1 | 69 | Kalle Rovanperä | Jonne Halttunen | Toyota Gazoo Racing WRT | Toyota GR Yaris Rally1 | 2:36:03.2 | 0.0 | 25 | 5 |
| 2 | 2 | 11 | Thierry Neuville | Martijn Wydaeghe | Hyundai Shell Mobis WRT | Hyundai i20 N Rally1 | 2:36:55.8 | +52.6 | 18 | 1 |
| 3 | 3 | 4 | Esapekka Lappi | Janne Ferm | Hyundai Shell Mobis WRT | Hyundai i20 N Rally1 | 2:37:02.7 | +59.5 | 15 | 3 |
| 4 | 4 | 33 | Elfyn Evans | Scott Martin | Toyota Gazoo Racing WRT | Toyota GR Yaris Rally1 | 2:37:09.9 | +1:06.7 | 12 | 4 |
| 5 | 5 | 3 | Teemu Suninen | Mikko Markkula | Hyundai Shell Mobis WRT | Hyundai i20 N Rally1 | 2:38:24.2 | +2:21.0 | 10 | 0 |
| 6 | 6 | 7 | Pierre-Louis Loubet | Nicolas Gilsoul | M-Sport Ford WRT | Ford Puma Rally1 | 2:39:13.1 | +3:09.9 | 8 | 0 |
| 7 | 7 | 18 | Takamoto Katsuta | Aaron Johnston | Toyota Gazoo Racing WRT | Toyota GR Yaris Rally1 | 2:39:13.4 | +3:10.2 | 6 | 0 |
| 8 | 8 | 8 | Ott Tänak | Martin Järveoja | M-Sport Ford WRT | Ford Puma Rally1 | 2:42:28.7 | +6:25.5 | 4 | 2 |

==== Special stages ====
| Stage | Winners | Car | Time | Class leaders |
|---|---|---|---|---|
| SD | Rovanperä / Halttunen | Toyota GR Yaris Rally1 | 1:58.8 | —N/a |
| SS1 | Tänak / Järveoja | Ford Puma Rally1 | 3:02.5 | Lappi / Ferm; Evans / Martin |
| SS2 | Tänak / Järveoja | Ford Puma Rally1 | 13:16.1 | Neuville / Wydaeghe |
| SS3 | Tänak / Järveoja | Ford Puma Rally1 | 8:47.4 | Neuville / Wydaeghe |
| SS4 | Tänak / Järveoja | Ford Puma Rally1 | 10:15.0 | Neuville / Wydaeghe |
| SS5 | Rovanperä / Halttunen | Toyota GR Yaris Rally1 | 13:18.7 | Neuville / Wydaeghe |
| SS6 | Rovanperä / Halttunen | Toyota GR Yaris Rally1 | 8:46.1 | Rovanperä / Halttunen |
| SS7 | Tänak / Järveoja | Ford Puma Rally1 | 10:02.2 | Rovanperä / Halttunen |
| SS8 | Tänak / Järveoja | Ford Puma Rally1 | 4:32.1 | Rovanperä / Halttunen |
| SS9 | Rovanperä / Halttunen | Toyota GR Yaris Rally1 | 5:39.3 | Rovanperä / Halttunen |
| SS10 | Rovanperä / Halttunen | Toyota GR Yaris Rally1 | 5:44.7 | Rovanperä / Halttunen |
| SS11 | Rovanperä / Halttunen | Toyota GR Yaris Rally1 | 5:34.2 | Rovanperä / Halttunen |
| SS12 | Rovanperä / Halttunen | Toyota GR Yaris Rally1 | 5:37.6 | Rovanperä / Halttunen |
| SS13 | Rovanperä / Halttunen | Toyota GR Yaris Rally1 | 5:55.1 | Rovanperä / Halttunen |
| SS14 | Rovanperä / Halttunen | Toyota GR Yaris Rally1 | 7:58.5 | Rovanperä / Halttunen |
| SS15 | Rovanperä / Halttunen | Toyota GR Yaris Rally1 | 5:48.7 | Rovanperä / Halttunen |
| SS16 | Rovanperä / Halttunen | Toyota GR Yaris Rally1 | 7:49.0 | Rovanperä / Halttunen |
| SS17 | Rovanperä / Halttunen | Toyota GR Yaris Rally1 | 3:00.0 | Rovanperä / Halttunen |
| SS18 | Rovanperä / Halttunen | Toyota GR Yaris Rally1 | 6:00.0 | Rovanperä / Halttunen |
| SS19 | Rovanperä / Halttunen | Toyota GR Yaris Rally1 | 9:23.6 | Rovanperä / Halttunen |
| SS20 | Rovanperä / Halttunen | Toyota GR Yaris Rally1 | 5:55.3 | Rovanperä / Halttunen |
| SS21 | Rovanperä / Halttunen | Toyota GR Yaris Rally1 | 9:14.9 | Rovanperä / Halttunen |

==== Championship standings ====
| Pos. | Drivers' championships | | | Co-drivers' championships | | | Manufacturers' championships | | |
| Pos. | Move | Driver | Points | Move | Co-driver | Points | Move | Manufacturer | Points |
|---|---|---|---|---|---|---|---|---|---|
| 1 | | Kalle Rovanperä | 170 | | Jonne Halttunen | 170 | | Toyota Gazoo Racing WRT | 331 |
| 2 | | Elfyn Evans | 115 | | Scott Martin | 115 | | Hyundai Shell Mobis WRT | 274 |
| 3 | 2 | Thierry Neuville | 112 | 2 | Martijn Wydaeghe | 112 | | M-Sport Ford WRT | 195 |
| 4 | | Ott Tänak | 104 | | Martin Järveoja | 104 | | | |
| 5 | 2 | Sébastien Ogier | 98 | 2 | Vincent Landais | 98 | | | |

=== WRC-2 Rally2 ===
==== Classification ====
| Position | | No. | Driver | Co-driver | Entrant | Car | Time | Difference | Points | | |
| Event | Class | No. | Driver | Co-driver | Entrant | Car | Time | Difference | Class | Stage | Event |
|---|---|---|---|---|---|---|---|---|---|---|---|
| 9 | 1 | 23 | Andreas Mikkelsen | Torstein Eriksen | Toksport WRT 3 | Škoda Fabia RS Rally2 | 2:45:57.3 | 0.0 | 25 | 2 | 2 |
| 10 | 2 | 24 | Sami Pajari | Enni Mälkönen | Toksport WRT | Škoda Fabia RS Rally2 | 2:46:07.0 | +9.7 | 18 | 3 | 1 |
| 11 | 3 | 22 | Emil Lindholm | Reeta Hämäläinen | Hyundai Motorsport N | Hyundai i20 N Rally2 | 2:47:19.0 | +1:21.7 | 15 | 0 | 0 |
| 12 | 4 | 27 | Marco Bulacia | Diego Vallejo | Toksport WRT | Škoda Fabia RS Rally2 | 2:48:00.9 | +2:03.6 | 12 | 0 | 0 |
| 13 | 5 | 29 | Mikołaj Marczyk | Szymon Gospodarczyk | Mikołaj Marczyk | Škoda Fabia RS Rally2 | 2:48:20.2 | +2:22.9 | 10 | 1 | 0 |
| 14 | 6 | 26 | Robert Virves | Craig Drew | Robert Virves | Ford Fiesta Rally2 | 2:48:32.5 | +2:35.2 | 8 | 0 | 0 |
| 15 | 7 | 25 | Egon Kaur | Jakko Viilo | Egon Kaur | Škoda Fabia RS Rally2 | 2:48:32.9 | +2:35.6 | 6 | 0 | 0 |
| 16 | 8 | 31 | Josh McErlean | James Fulton | Motorsport Ireland Rally Academy | Hyundai i20 N Rally2 | 2:49:56.4 | +3:59.1 | 4 | 0 | 0 |
| 19 | 9 | 38 | Kaspar Kasari | Rainis Raidma | Kaspar Kasari | Škoda Fabia R5 | 2:57:43.0 | +11:45.7 | 2 | 0 | 0 |
| 21 | 10 | 35 | Bruno Bulacia | Axel Coronado | Bruno Bulacia | Škoda Fabia RS Rally2 | 2:58:04.5 | +12:07.2 | 1 | 0 | 0 |
| 25 | 11 | 39 | Alexander Villanueva | José Murado González | Alexander Villanueva | Škoda Fabia RS Rally2 | 3:01:54.5 | +15:57.2 | 0 | 0 | 0 |
| 28 | 12 | 37 | Priit Koik | Kristo Tamm | Priit Koik | Škoda Fabia Rally2 evo | 3:05:25.9 | +19:28.6 | 0 | 0 | 0 |
| 29 | 13 | 41 | Mauro Miele | Luca Beltrame | Mauro Miele | Škoda Fabia RS Rally2 | 3:09:54.7 | +23:57.4 | 0 | 0 | 0 |
| 32 | 14 | 30 | Fabrizio Zaldivar | Marcelo Der Ohannesian | Hyundai Motorsport N | Hyundai i20 N Rally2 | 3:12:35.7 | +26:38.4 | 0 | 0 | 0 |
| 36 | 15 | 45 | Luciano Cobbe | Roberto Mometti | Luciano Cobbe | Škoda Fabia Rally2 evo | 3:21:04.4 | +35:07.1 | 0 | 0 | 0 |
| 38 | 16 | 20 | Oliver Solberg | Elliott Edmondson | Oliver Solberg | Škoda Fabia RS Rally2 | 3:26:56.2 | +40:58.9 | 0 | 0 | 0 |
| 39 | 17 | 28 | Georg Linnamäe | James Morgan | Georg Linnamäe | Hyundai i20 N Rally2 | 3:27:20.9 | +41:23.6 | 0 | 0 | 0 |
| 42 | 18 | 34 | Jorge Martínez Fontena | Alberto Alvarez Nicholson | Jorge Martínez Fontena | Škoda Fabia Rally2 evo | 3:42:58.7 | +57:01.4 | 0 | 0 | 0 |
| 43 | 19 | 40 | Armin Kremer | Ella Kremer | Armin Kremer | Škoda Fabia RS Rally2 | 3:49:37.7 | +1:03:40.4 | 0 | 0 | 0 |
| Retired SS21 | | 21 | Gus Greensmith | Jonas Andersson | Toksport WRT 3 | Škoda Fabia RS Rally2 | Suspension | | 0 | 0 | 0 |
| Retired SS19 | | 36 | Emilio Fernández | Borja Rozada | Emilio Fernández | Škoda Fabia Rally2 evo | Accident | | 0 | 0 | 0 |
| Did not start | | 32 | Alejandro Cachón | Alejandro López | Alejandro Cachón | Citroën C3 Rally2 | Withdrawn | | 0 | 0 | 0 |
| Did not start | | 44 | Miguel Zaldivar Sr. | José Luis Díaz | Miguel Zaldivar Sr. | Hyundai i20 N Rally2 | Withdrawn | | 0 | 0 | 0 |
| Did not start | | 46 | Nasser Khalifa Al-Attiyah | Giovanni Bernacchini | Nasser Khalifa Al-Attiyah | Ford Fiesta Rally2 | Withdrawn | | 0 | 0 | 0 |

==== Special stages ====
Overall
| Stage | Winners | Car | Time | Class leaders |
|---|---|---|---|---|
| SD | Solberg / Edmondson | Škoda Fabia RS Rally2 | 2:07.5 | —N/a |
| SS1 | Marczyk / Gospodarczyk | Škoda Fabia RS Rally2 | 3:09.0 | Marczyk / Gospodarczyk |
| SS2 | Solberg / Edmondson | Škoda Fabia RS Rally2 | 13:52.6 | Solberg / Edmondson |
| SS3 | Solberg / Edmondson | Škoda Fabia RS Rally2 | 9:16.9 | Solberg / Edmondson |
| SS4 | Linnamäe / Morgan | Hyundai i20 N Rally2 | 10:41.5 | Solberg / Edmondson |
| SS5 | Pajari / Mälkonen | Škoda Fabia RS Rally2 | 14:06.6 | Mikkelsen / Eriksen |
| SS6 | Mikkelsen / Eriksen | Škoda Fabia RS Rally2 | 9:29.2 | Mikkelsen / Eriksen |
| SS7 | Lindholm / Hämäläinen | Hyundai i20 N Rally2 | 10:45.4 | Mikkelsen / Eriksen |
| SS8 | Pajari / Mälkonen | Škoda Fabia RS Rally2 | 4:47.5 | Mikkelsen / Eriksen |
| SS9 | Solberg / Edmondson | Škoda Fabia RS Rally2 | 6:00.5 | Mikkelsen / Eriksen |
| SS10 | Solberg / Edmondson | Škoda Fabia RS Rally2 | 6:02.3 | Mikkelsen / Eriksen |
| SS11 | Solberg / Edmondson | Škoda Fabia RS Rally2 | 5:54.5 | Mikkelsen / Eriksen |
| SS12 | Solberg / Edmondson | Škoda Fabia RS Rally2 | 5:57.1 | Mikkelsen / Eriksen |
| SS13 | Solberg / Edmondson | Škoda Fabia RS Rally2 | 6:15.2 | Mikkelsen / Eriksen |
| SS14 | Solberg / Edmondson | Škoda Fabia RS Rally2 | 8:23.0 | Mikkelsen / Eriksen |
| SS15 | Solberg / Edmondson | Škoda Fabia RS Rally2 | 6:08.6 | Mikkelsen / Eriksen |
| SS16 | Pajari / Mälkönen | Škoda Fabia RS Rally2 | 8:17.1 | Mikkelsen / Eriksen |
| SS17 | Mikkelsen / Eriksen | Škoda Fabia RS Rally2 | 3:05.8 | Mikkelsen / Eriksen |
| SS18 | Pajari / Mälkönen | Škoda Fabia RS Rally2 | 6:25.7 | Mikkelsen / Eriksen |
| SS19 | Solberg / Edmondson | Škoda Fabia RS Rally2 | 10:01.3 | Mikkelsen / Eriksen |
| SS20 | Pajari / Mälkönen | Škoda Fabia RS Rally2 | 6:19.2 | Mikkelsen / Eriksen |
| SS21 | Pajari / Mälkönen | Škoda Fabia RS Rally2 | 9:56.7 | Mikkelsen / Eriksen |

Challenger
| Stage | Winners | Car | Time | Class leaders |
|---|---|---|---|---|
| SD | Pajari / Mälkönen | Škoda Fabia RS Rally2 | 2:09.6 | —N/a |
| SS1 | Marczyk / Gospodarczyk | Škoda Fabia RS Rally2 | 3:09.0 | Marczyk / Gospodarczyk |
| SS2 | Kaur / Viilo | Škoda Fabia RS Rally2 | 14:00.3 | Kaur / Viilo |
| SS3 | Linnamäe / Morgan | Hyundai i20 N Rally2 | 9:23.0 | Kaur / Viilo |
| SS4 | Linnamäe / Morgan | Hyundai i20 N Rally2 | 10:41.5 | Linnamäe / Morgan |
| SS5 | Pajari / Mälkonen | Škoda Fabia RS Rally2 | 14:06.6 | Pajari / Mälkonen |
| SS6 | Bulacia / Vallejo | Škoda Fabia RS Rally2 | 9:29.6 | Kaur / Viilo |
| SS7 | Pajari / Mälkonen | Škoda Fabia RS Rally2 | 10:48.1 | Pajari / Mälkonen |
| SS8 | Pajari / Mälkonen | Škoda Fabia RS Rally2 | 4:47.5 | Pajari / Mälkonen |
| SS9 | Pajari / Mälkonen | Škoda Fabia RS Rally2 | 6:02.4 | Pajari / Mälkonen |
| SS10 | Linnamäe / Morgan | Hyundai i20 N Rally2 | 6:06.7 | Pajari / Mälkonen |
| SS11 | Pajari / Mälkonen | Škoda Fabia RS Rally2 | 5:56.9 | Pajari / Mälkonen |
| SS12 | Pajari / Mälkonen; Marczyk / Gospodarczyk | Škoda Fabia RS Rally2; Škoda Fabia RS Rally2 | 6:01.5 | Pajari / Mälkonen |
| SS13 | Pajari / Mälkonen | Škoda Fabia RS Rally2 | 6:17.5 | Pajari / Mälkonen |
| SS14 | Marczyk / Gospodarczyk | Škoda Fabia RS Rally2 | 8:28.8 | Pajari / Mälkonen |
| SS15 | Pajari / Mälkonen | Škoda Fabia RS Rally2 | 6:11.7 | Pajari / Mälkonen |
| SS16 | Pajari / Mälkönen | Škoda Fabia RS Rally2 | 8:17.1 | Pajari / Mälkonen |
| SS17 | Pajari / Mälkönen | Škoda Fabia RS Rally2 | 3:06.5 | Pajari / Mälkonen |
| SS18 | Pajari / Mälkönen | Škoda Fabia RS Rally2 | 6:25.7 | Pajari / Mälkonen |
| SS19 | Pajari / Mälkönen | Škoda Fabia RS Rally2 | 10:03.2 | Pajari / Mälkonen |
| SS20 | Pajari / Mälkönen | Škoda Fabia RS Rally2 | 6:19.2 | Pajari / Mälkonen |
| SS21 | Pajari / Mälkönen | Škoda Fabia RS Rally2 | 9:56.7 | Pajari / Mälkonen |

==== Championship standings ====
| Pos. | Open Drivers' championships | | | Open Co-drivers' championships | | | Teams' championships | | | Challenger Drivers' championships | | | Challenger Co-drivers' championships | | |
| Pos. | Move | Driver | Points | Move | Co-driver | Points | Move | Manufacturer | Points | Move | Manufacturer | Points | Move | Driver | Points |
|---|---|---|---|---|---|---|---|---|---|---|---|---|---|---|---|
| 1 | | Yohan Rossel | 77 | 3 | Torstein Eriksen | 88 | 1 | Toksport WRT | 110 | | Kajetan Kajetanowicz | 75 | | Maciej Szczepaniak | 75 |
| 2 | 4 | Andreas Mikkelsen | 69 | 1 | Arnaud Dunand | 77 | 1 | Hyundai Motorsport N | 98 | 3 | Sami Pajari | 68 | 1 | Enni Mälkönen | 68 |
| 3 | 1 | Oliver Solberg | 64 | 1 | Elliott Edmondson | 64 | 1 | Toksport WRT 3 | 93 | | Marco Bulacia | 68 | 1 | Diego Vallejo | 58 |
| 4 | 1 | Gus Greensmith | 62 | 1 | Jonas Andersson | 62 | 3 | M-Sport Ford WRT | 91 | 2 | Nikolay Gryazin | 50 | 2 | Konstantin Aleksandrov | 50 |
| 5 | | Emil Lindholm | 59 | 1 | Reeta Hämäläinen | 59 | | Toksport WRT 2 | 65 | 2 | Mikołaj Marczyk | 45 | 2 | Szymon Gospodarczyk | 45 |

=== WRC-3 Rally3 ===
==== Classification ====
| Position | | No. | Driver | Co-driver | Entrant | Car | Time | Difference | Points |
| Event | Class | No. | Driver | Co-driver | Entrant | Car | Time | Difference | Points |
|---|---|---|---|---|---|---|---|---|---|
| 17 | 1 | 47 | Roope Korhonen | Anssi Viinikka | Rautio Motorsport | Ford Fiesta Rally3 | 2:57:16.2 | 0.0 | 25 |
| 20 | 2 | 54 | Laurent Pellier | Kévin Bronner | Laurent Pellier | Ford Fiesta Rally3 | 2:57:50.8 | +34.6 | 18 |
| 22 | 3 | 48 | Toni Herranen | Mikko Lukka | Toni Herranen | Ford Fiesta Rally3 | 2:59:59.0 | +2:42.8 | 15 |
| 24 | 4 | 49 | Ali Türkkan | Burak Erdener | Castrol Ford Team Türkiye | Ford Fiesta Rally3 | 3:01:51.6 | +4:35.4 | 12 |
| 31 | 5 | 55 | Roberto Blach Núñez | Mauro Barreiro | Roberto Blach Núñez | Ford Fiesta Rally3 | 3:10:56.5 | +13:40.3 | 10 |
| 33 | 6 | 59 | Hamza Anwar | Alexander Kihurani | Hamza Anwar | Ford Fiesta Rally3 | 3:12:47.0 | +15:30.8 | 8 |
| 34 | 7 | 51 | Brendan Cumiskey | Arthur Kierans | Brendan Cumiskey | Ford Fiesta Rally3 | 3:14:42.8 | +17:26.6 | 6 |
| 35 | 8 | 56 | Tom Rensonnet | Loïc Dumont | RACB National Team | Ford Fiesta Rally3 | 3:15:00.5 | +17:44.3 | 4 |
| 37 | 9 | 50 | Benjamin Korhola | Pekka Kelander | Rautio Motorsport | Ford Fiesta Rally3 | 3:26:41.8 | +29:25.6 | 2 |
| 41 | 10 | 52 | William Creighton | Liam Regan | Motorsport Ireland Rally Academy | Ford Fiesta Rally3 | 3:36:32.9 | +39:16.7 | 1 |
| Retired SS21 | | 57 | Eamonn Kelly | Conor Mohan | Motorsport Ireland Rally Academy | Ford Fiesta Rally3 | Mechanical | | 0 |

==== Special stages ====
| Stage | Winners | Car | Time | Class leaders |
|---|---|---|---|---|
| SD | Korhola / Kelander | Ford Fiesta Rally3 | 2:19.5 | —N/a |
| SS1 | Korhola / Kelander | Ford Fiesta Rally3 | 3:13.9 | Korhola / Kelander |
| SS2 | Korhola / Kelander | Ford Fiesta Rally3 | 14:46.9 | Korhola / Kelander |
| SS3 | Korhola / Kelander | Ford Fiesta Rally3 | 9:55.1 | Korhola / Kelander |
| SS4 | Korhonen / Viinikka | Ford Fiesta Rally3 | 11:21.3 | Korhola / Kelander |
| SS5 | Korhola / Kelander | Ford Fiesta Rally3 | 15:03.3 | Korhola / Kelander |
| SS6 | Korhonen / Viinikka | Ford Fiesta Rally3 | 10:07.7 | Korhonen / Viinikka |
| SS7 | Pellier / Bronner | Ford Fiesta Rally3 | 11:37.9 | Korhonen / Viinikka |
| SS8 | Korhonen / Viinikka | Ford Fiesta Rally3 | 5:02.0 | Korhonen / Viinikka |
| SS9 | Creighton / Regan | Ford Fiesta Rally3 | 6:20.9 | Korhonen / Viinikka |
| SS10 | Creighton / Regan | Ford Fiesta Rally3 | 6:28.3 | Korhonen / Viinikka |
| SS11 | Pellier / Bronner | Ford Fiesta Rally3 | 6:23.2 | Korhonen / Viinikka |
| SS12 | Korhola / Kelander | Ford Fiesta Rally3 | 6:26.1 | Korhonen / Viinikka |
| SS13 | Creighton / Regan | Ford Fiesta Rally3 | 6:36.8 | Korhonen / Viinikka |
| SS14 | Creighton / Regan | Ford Fiesta Rally3 | 8:54.9 | Korhonen / Viinikka |
| SS15 | Korhonen / Viinikka | Ford Fiesta Rally3 | 6:34.1 | Korhonen / Viinikka |
| SS16 | Korhola / Kelander | Ford Fiesta Rally3 | 8:50.1 | Korhonen / Viinikka |
| SS17 | Creighton / Regan | Ford Fiesta Rally3 | 3:14.6 | Korhonen / Viinikka |
| SS18 | Creighton / Regan | Ford Fiesta Rally3 | 6:50.1 | Korhonen / Viinikka |
| SS19 | Creighton / Regan | Ford Fiesta Rally3 | 10:37.6 | Korhonen / Viinikka |
| SS20 | Pellier / Bronner | Ford Fiesta Rally3 | 6:44.1 | Korhonen / Viinikka |
| SS21 | Creighton / Regan | Ford Fiesta Rally3 | 10:29.4 | Korhonen / Viinikka |

==== Championship standings ====
| Pos. | Drivers' championships | | | Co-drivers' championships | | |
| Pos. | Move | Driver | Points | Move | Co-driver | Points |
|---|---|---|---|---|---|---|
| 1 | | Roope Korhonen | 100 | | Anssi Viinikka | 100 |
| 2 | | Diego Dominguez Jr. | 62 | | Rogelio Peñate | 62 |
| 3 | | William Creighton | 47 | | Liam Regan | 47 |
| 4 | 4 | Laurent Pellier | 43 | | Loïc Dumont | 40 |
| 5 | | Tom Rensonnet | 40 | 2 | Mikko Lukka | 37 |

=== J-WRC Rally3 ===
==== Classification ====
| Position | | No. | Driver | Co-driver | Entrant | Car | Time | Difference | Points | |
| Event | Class | No. | Driver | Co-driver | Entrant | Car | Time | Difference | Class | Stage |
|---|---|---|---|---|---|---|---|---|---|---|
| 18 | 1 | 58 | Grégoire Munster | Louis Louka | Grégoire Munster | Ford Fiesta Rally3 | 2:57:42.7 | 0.0 | 25 | 5 |
| 20 | 2 | 54 | Laurent Pellier | Kévin Bronner | Laurent Pellier | Ford Fiesta Rally3 | 2:57:50.8 | +8.1 | 18 | 3 |
| 23 | 3 | 53 | Diego Dominguez Jr. | Rogelio Peñate | Diego Dominguez Jr. | Ford Fiesta Rally3 | 3:00:43.6 | +3:00.9 | 15 | 2 |
| 31 | 4 | 55 | Roberto Blach Núñez | Mauro Barreiro | Roberto Blach Núñez | Ford Fiesta Rally3 | 3:10:56.5 | +13:13.8 | 12 | 0 |
| 33 | 5 | 59 | Hamza Anwar | Alexander Kihurani | Hamza Anwar | Ford Fiesta Rally3 | 3:12:47.0 | +15:04.3 | 10 | 0 |
| 35 | 6 | 56 | Tom Rensonnet | Loïc Dumont | RACB National Team | Ford Fiesta Rally3 | 3:15:00.5 | +17:17.8 | 8 | 0 |
| 41 | 7 | 52 | William Creighton | Liam Regan | Motorsport Ireland Rally Academy | Ford Fiesta Rally3 | 3:36:32.9 | +38:50.2 | 6 | 11 |
| Retired SS21 | | 57 | Eamonn Kelly | Conor Mohan | Motorsport Ireland Rally Academy | Ford Fiesta Rally3 | Mechanical | | 0 | 0 |

==== Special stages ====
| Stage | Winners | Car | Time | Class leaders |
|---|---|---|---|---|
| SD | Munster / Louka | Ford Fiesta Rally3 | 2:20.8 | —N/a |
| SS1 | Dominguez Jr. / Peñate | Ford Fiesta Rally3 | 3:14.3 | Dominguez Jr. / Peñate |
| SS2 | Creighton / Regan | Ford Fiesta Rally3 | 14:53.9 | Creighton / Regan |
| SS3 | Creighton / Regan | Ford Fiesta Rally3 | 10:09.7 | Creighton / Regan |
| SS4 | Munster / Louka | Ford Fiesta Rally3 | 11:26.2 | Creighton / Regan |
| SS5 | Munster / Louka | Ford Fiesta Rally3 | 15:25.0 | Munster / Louka |
| SS6 | Pellier / Bronner | Ford Fiesta Rally3 | 10:10.5 | Munster / Louka |
| SS7 | Munster / Louka | Ford Fiesta Rally3 | 11:35.5 | Munster / Louka |
| SS8 | Munster / Louka | Ford Fiesta Rally3 | 5:01.6 | Munster / Louka |
| SS9 | Creighton / Regan | Ford Fiesta Rally3 | 6:20.9 | Munster / Louka |
| SS10 | Creighton / Regan | Ford Fiesta Rally3 | 6:28.3 | Munster / Louka |
| SS11 | Pellier / Bronner | Ford Fiesta Rally3 | 6:23.2 | Munster / Louka |
| SS12 | Creighton / Regan | Ford Fiesta Rally3 | 6:26.6 | Munster / Louka |
| SS13 | Creighton / Regan | Ford Fiesta Rally3 | 6:36.8 | Munster / Louka |
| SS14 | Creighton / Regan | Ford Fiesta Rally3 | 8:54.9 | Munster / Louka |
| SS15 | Creighton / Regan | Ford Fiesta Rally3 | 6:34.9 | Munster / Louka |
| SS16 | Munster / Louka | Ford Fiesta Rally3 | 8:49.1 | Munster / Louka |
| SS17 | Dominguez Jr. / Peñate | Ford Fiesta Rally3 | 3:14.0 | Munster / Louka |
| SS18 | Creighton / Regan | Ford Fiesta Rally3 | 6:50.1 | Munster / Louka |
| SS19 | Creighton / Regan | Ford Fiesta Rally3 | 10:37.6 | Munster / Louka |
| SS20 | Pellier / Bronner | Ford Fiesta Rally3 | 6:44.1 | Munster / Louka |
| SS21 | Creighton / Regan | Ford Fiesta Rally3 | 10:29.4 | Munster / Louka |

==== Championship standings ====
| Pos. | Drivers' championships | | | Co-drivers' championships | | |
| Pos. | Move | Driver | Points | Move | Co-driver | Points |
|---|---|---|---|---|---|---|
| 1 | | William Creighton | 96 | | Liam Regan | 96 |
| 2 | 1 | Laurent Pellier | 67 | | Rogelio Peñate | 64 |
| 3 | 1 | Diego Dominguez Jr. | 64 | | Mauro Barreiro | 53 |
| 4 | | Roberto Blach | 53 | 5 | Louis Louka | 45 |
| 5 | 4 | Grégoire Munster | 45 | 1 | Loïc Dumont | 44 |

| Previous rally: 2023 Safari Rally | 2023 FIA World Rally Championship | Next rally: 2023 Rally Finland |
| Previous rally: 2022 Rally Estonia | 2023 Rally Estonia | Next rally: 2024 Rally Estonia |
