= 2023 Rally Italia Sardegna =

20th edition of Rally Italia Sardegna

2023 Rally Italia Sardegna Rally Italia Sardegna 2023
Round 6 of 13 in the 2023 World Rally Championship
← Previous event	Next event →
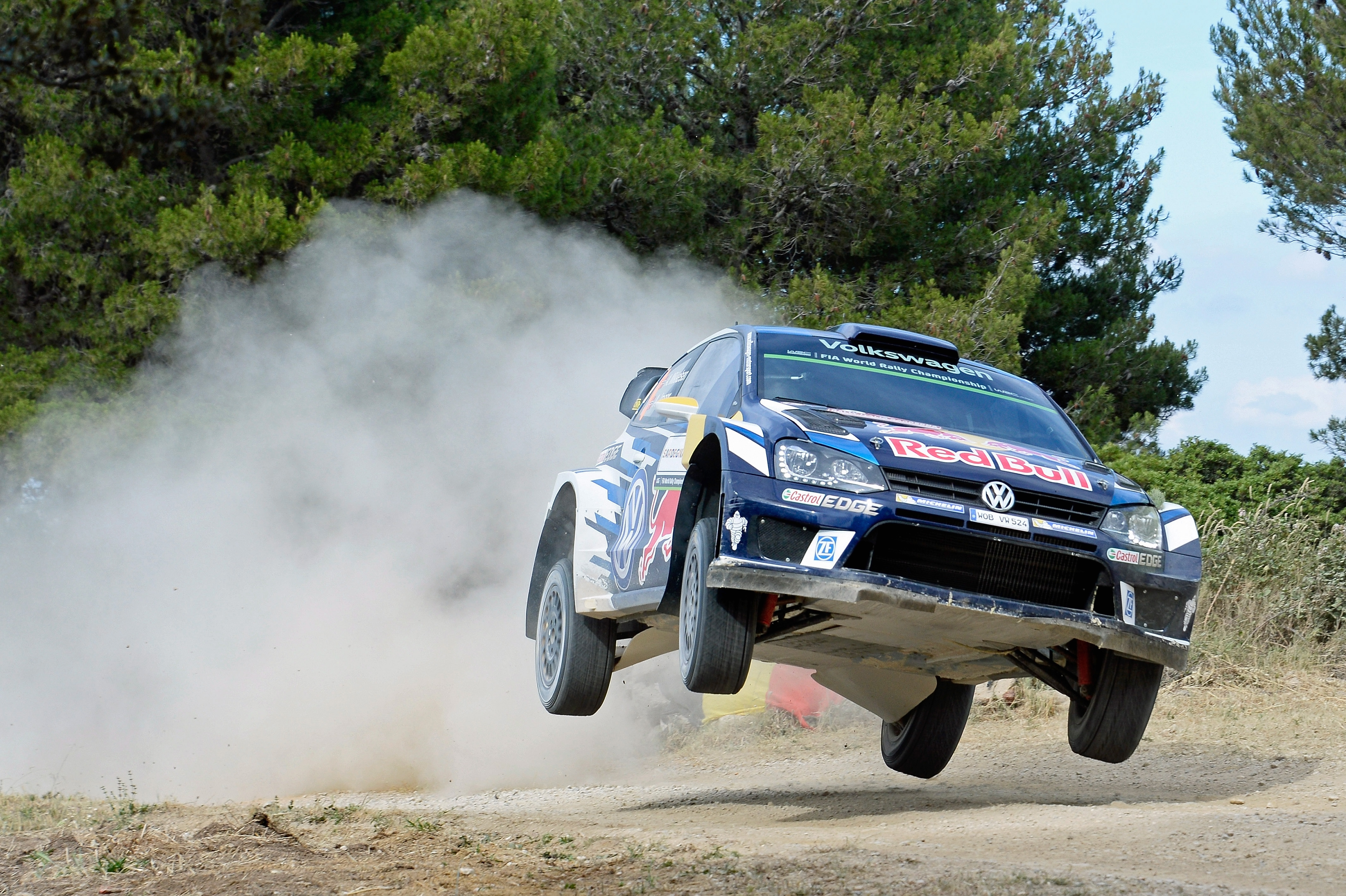
- The Sardinia Rally is known for its fast but narrow roads.
- Host country: Italy
- Rally base: Olbia, Sassari
- Dates run: 1 – 4 June 2023
- Start location: Olbia, Sassari
- Finish location: Sassari, Sassari
- Stages: 19 (322.79 km; 200.57 miles)
- Stage surface: Gravel
- Transport distance: 836.01 km (519.47 miles)
- Overall distance: 1,170.06 km (727.04 miles)

Statistics
- Crews registered: 74
- Crews: 71 at start, 59 at finish

Overall results
- Overall winner: (Belgium) Thierry Neuville (Belgium) Martijn Wydaeghe (South Korea) Hyundai Shell Mobis WRT; 3:40:01.4
- Power Stage winner: (Finland) Kalle Rovanperä (Finland) Jonne Halttunen (Japan) Toyota Gazoo Racing WRT; 5:55.0

Support category results
- WRC-2 winner: (Norway) Andreas Mikkelsen (Norway) Torstein Eriksen (Germany) Toksport WRT 3; 3:49:34.7
- WRC-3 winner: (Finland) Roope Korhonen (Finland) Anssi Viinikka (Finland) Rautio Motorsport; 4:14:20.0
- J-WRC winner: (Republic of Ireland) William Creighton (Republic of Ireland) Liam Regan (Republic of Ireland) Motorsport Ireland Rally Academy; 4:15:11.5

The 2023 Rally Italia Sardegna (also known as the Rally Italia Sardegna 2023) was a motor racing event for rally cars held from 1 June to 4 June 2023. It marked the twentieth running of the Rally Italia Sardegna, and was the sixth round of the 2023 World Rally Championship, World Rally Championship-2 and World Rally Championship-3. The event was also the third round of the 2023 Junior World Rally Championship. The event was based in Olbia in the Province of Sassari, and was contested over nineteen special stages covering a total competitive distance of 322.79 km (200.57 mi).

Ott Tänak and Martin Järveoja were the defending rally winners. Hyundai Shell Mobis WRT, the team they drove for in 2022, are the defending manufacturer's winners. Nikolay Gryazin and Konstantin Aleksandrov are the defending rally winners in the WRC-2 category. Jan Černý and Tomáš Střeska are the defending rally winners in the WRC-3 category.

Thierry Neuville and Martijn Wydaeghe won the rally. Their team, Hyundai Shell Mobis WRT, successfully defended their manufacturer's title. Andreas Mikkelsen and Torstein Eriksen won the World Rally Championship-2 category. Roope Korhonen and Anssi Viinikka won the World Rally Championship-3 category. The Motorsport Ireland Rally Academy crew of William Creighton and Liam Regan won the junior class.

== Background ==
=== Entry list ===
The following crews entered into the rally. The event was open to crews competing in the World Rally Championship, its support categories, the World Rally Championship-2, World Rally Championship-3, Junior World Rally Championship and privateer entries that were not registered to score points in any championship. Nine entered under Rally1 regulations, as were thirty-nine Rally2 crews in the World Rally Championship-2 and nine Rally3 crew in the World Rally Championship-3. A total of eight crews were registered to participate in the Junior World Rally Championship.

Rally1 entries competing in the World Rally Championship
No.	Driver	Co-Driver	Entrant	Car	Championship eligibility	Tyre
4	(Finland) Esapekka Lappi	(Finland) Janne Ferm	(South Korea) Hyundai Shell Mobis WRT	Hyundai i20 N Rally1	Driver, Co-driver, Manufacturer	P
6	(Spain) Dani Sordo	(Spain) Cándido Carrera	(South Korea) Hyundai Shell Mobis WRT	Hyundai i20 N Rally1	Driver, Co-driver, Manufacturer	P
7	(France) Pierre-Louis Loubet	(Belgium) Nicolas Gilsoul	(United Kingdom) M-Sport Ford WRT	Ford Puma Rally1	Driver, Co-driver, Manufacturer	P
8	(Estonia) Ott Tänak	(Estonia) Martin Järveoja	(United Kingdom) M-Sport Ford WRT	Ford Puma Rally1	Driver, Co-driver, Manufacturer	P
11	(Belgium) Thierry Neuville	(Belgium) Martijn Wydaeghe	(South Korea) Hyundai Shell Mobis WRT	Hyundai i20 N Rally1	Driver, Co-driver, Manufacturer	P
17	(France) Sébastien Ogier	(France) Vincent Landais	(Japan) Toyota Gazoo Racing WRT	Toyota GR Yaris Rally1	Driver, Co-driver, Manufacturer	P
18	(Japan) Takamoto Katsuta	(Republic of Ireland) Aaron Johnston	(Japan) Toyota Gazoo Racing WRT	Toyota GR Yaris Rally1	Driver, Co-driver	P
33	(United Kingdom) Elfyn Evans	(United Kingdom) Scott Martin	(Japan) Toyota Gazoo Racing WRT	Toyota GR Yaris Rally1	Driver, Co-driver, Manufacturer	P
69	(Finland) Kalle Rovanperä	(Finland) Jonne Halttunen	(Japan) Toyota Gazoo Racing WRT	Toyota GR Yaris Rally1	Driver, Co-driver, Manufacturer	P

Rally2 entries competing in the World Rally Championship-2
No.	Driver	Co-Driver	Entrant	Car	Championship eligibility	Tyre
20	(France) Yohan Rossel	(France) Arnaud Dunand	(France) PH Sport	Citroën C3 Rally2	Driver, Co-driver	P
21	(United Kingdom) Gus Greensmith	(Sweden) Jonas Andersson	(Germany) Toksport WRT 3	Škoda Fabia RS Rally2	Team	P
22	(Sweden) Oliver Solberg	(United Kingdom) Elliott Edmondson	(Sweden) Oliver Solberg	Škoda Fabia RS Rally2	Driver, Co-driver	P
23	(Norway) Andreas Mikkelsen	(Norway) Torstein Eriksen	(Germany) Toksport WRT 3	Škoda Fabia RS Rally2	Driver, Co-driver, Team	P
24	Nikolay Gryazin (Note: Nikolay Gryazin is Russian, but he competes as a neutral competitor using the ANA flag as Russian national emblems were banned by the association due to the Russian invasion of Ukraine.)	Konstantin Aleksandrov (Note: Konstantin Aleksandrov is Russian, but he competes as a neutral competitor using the ANA flag as Russian national emblems were banned by the association due to the Russian invasion of Ukraine.)	(Germany) Toksport WRT 2	Škoda Fabia RS Rally2	Challenger Driver, Challenger Co-driver	P
25	(Finland) Teemu Suninen	(Finland) Mikko Markkula	(South Korea) Hyundai Motorsport N	Hyundai i20 N Rally2	Driver, Co-driver, Team	P
27	(France) Adrien Fourmaux	(France) Alexandre Coria	(United Kingdom) M-Sport Ford WRT	Ford Fiesta Rally2	Driver, Co-driver, Team	P
28	(France) Nicolas Ciamin	(France) Yannick Roche	(France) Nicolas Ciamin	Volkswagen Polo GTI R5	Challenger Driver, Challenger Co-driver	P
29	(Poland) Kajetan Kajetanowicz	(Poland) Maciej Szczepaniak	(Poland) Kajetan Kajetanowicz	Škoda Fabia RS Rally2	Challenger Driver, Challenger Co-driver	P
30	(Luxembourg) Grégoire Munster	(Belgium) Louis Louka	(United Kingdom) M-Sport Ford WRT	Ford Fiesta Rally2	Challenger Driver, Challenger Co-driver, Team	P
31	(Paraguay) Fabrizio Zaldivar	(Italy) Marcelo Der Ohannesian	(South Korea) Hyundai Motorsport N	Hyundai i20 N Rally2	Challenger Driver, Challenger Co-driver, Team	P
32	(Finland) Sami Pajari	(Finland) Enni Mälkönen	(Germany) Toksport WRT	Škoda Fabia RS Rally2	Challenger Driver, Challenger Co-driver	P
34	(Bolivia) Bruno Bulacia	(Spain) Axel Coronado Jiménez	(Bolivia) Marco Bulacia	Škoda Fabia Rally2 evo	Challenger Driver, Challenger Co-driver	P
35	(Spain) Alejandro Cachón	(Spain) Alejandro López Fernández	(Spain) Alejandro Cachón	Citroën C3 Rally2	Challenger Driver, Challenger Co-driver	P
36	(Estonia) Georg Linnamäe	(United Kingdom) James Morgan	(Estonia) Georg Linnamäe	Hyundai i20 N Rally2	Challenger Driver, Challenger Co-driver	P
37	(Poland) Mikołaj Marczyk	(Poland) Szymon Gospodarczyk	(Poland) Mikołaj Marczyk	Škoda Fabia RS Rally2	Challenger Driver, Challenger Co-driver	P
38	(Republic of Ireland) Josh McErlean	(Republic of Ireland) John Rowan	(Republic of Ireland) Motorsport Ireland Rally Academy	Hyundai i20 N Rally2	Challenger Driver, Challenger Co-driver, Team	P
39	(Finland) Lauri Joona	(Finland) Tuukka Shemeikka	(Finland) Lauri Joona	Škoda Fabia Rally2 evo	Challenger Driver, Challenger Co-driver	P
40	(Estonia) Robert Virves	(Portugal) Hugo Magalhães	(Estonia) Robert Virves	Ford Fiesta Rally2	Challenger Driver, Challenger Co-driver	P
41	(Czech Republic) Erik Cais	(Czech Republic) Petr Těšínský	(Czech Republic) Erik Cais	Škoda Fabia RS Rally2	Challenger Driver, Challenger Co-driver	P
44	(Estonia) Gregor Jeets	(Estonia) Timo Taniel	(Estonia) Gregor Jeets	Hyundai i20 N Rally2	Challenger Driver, Challenger Co-driver	P
45	(Germany) Armin Kremer	(Germany) Timo Gottschalk	(Germany) Armin Kremer	Škoda Fabia RS Rally2	Challenger/Masters Driver, Challenger Co-driver	P
46	(Czech Republic) Martin Prokop	(Czech Republic) Michal Ernst	(Czech Republic) Martin Prokop	Škoda Fabia RS Rally2	Challenger Driver, Challenger Co-driver	P
47	(Italy) Mauro Miele	(Italy) Luca Beltrame	(Italy) Mauro Miele	Škoda Fabia RS Rally2	Challenger/Masters Driver, Challenger Co-driver	P
48	(Peru) Eduardo Castro	(Argentina) Fernando Mussano	(Peru) Eduardo Castro	Škoda Fabia Rally2 evo	Challenger Driver, Challenger Co-driver	P
49	(Republic of Ireland) Patrick O'Brien	(Republic of Ireland) Stephen O'Brien	(Republic of Ireland) Motorsport Ireland Rally Academy	Hyundai i20 N Rally2	Challenger Driver, Challenger Co-driver, Team	P
50	(Austria) Johannes Keferböck	(Austria) Ilka Minor	(Austria) Johannes Keferböck	Škoda Fabia Rally2 evo	Challenger/Masters Driver, Co-driver	P
51	(Paraguay) Miguel Zaldivar Sr.	(Argentina) José Luis Díaz	(Paraguay) Miguel Zaldivar Sr.	Hyundai i20 N Rally2	Challenger/Masters Driver, Challenger Co-driver	P
52	(Spain) Alexander Villanueva	(Spain) José Murado González	(Spain) Alexander Villanueva	Škoda Fabia RS Rally2	Challenger/Masters Driver, Challenger Co-driver	P
53	(Poland) Daniel Chwist	(Poland) Kamil Heller	(Poland) Daniel Chwist	Škoda Fabia Rally2 evo	Challenger/Masters Driver, Challenger Co-driver	P
54	(Hungary) Norbert Herczig	(Hungary) Ramón Ferencz	(Hungary) Norbert Herczig	Škoda Fabia Rally2 evo	Challenger Driver, Challenger Co-driver	P
55	(Qatar) Nasser Khalifa Al-Attiyah	(Italy) Giovanni Bernacchini	(Qatar) Nasser Khalifa Al-Attiyah	Ford Fiesta Rally2	Challenger/Masters Driver, Challenger Co-driver	P
56	(Italy) Giuseppe Dettori	(Italy) Carlo Pisano	(Italy) Giuseppe Dettori	Škoda Fabia R5	Challenger Driver, Challenger Co-driver	P
57	(Italy) Matteo Gamba	(Italy) Nicolò Gonella	(Italy) Matteo Gamba	Škoda Fabia Rally2 evo	Challenger Driver, Challenger Co-driver	P
58	(Italy) Nicola Tali	(Italy) Massimiliano Frau	(Italy) Nicola Tali	Škoda Fabia Rally2 evo	Challenger Driver, Challenger Co-driver	P
59	(Italy) Pablo Biolghini	(Italy) Stefano Pudda	(Italy) Pablo Biolghini	Škoda Fabia Rally2 evo	Challenger Driver, Challenger Co-driver	P
60	(Italy) Maurizio Morato	(Italy) Andrea Dal Maso	(Italy) Maurizio Morato	Škoda Fabia R5	Challenger Driver, Challenger Co-driver	P
61	(Italy) Carlo Covi	(Italy) Andrea Budoia	(Italy) Carlo Covi	Škoda Fabia Rally2 evo	Challenger Driver, Challenger Co-driver	P
62	(Italy) Francesco Tali	(Italy) Chiara Corso	(Italy) Francesco Tali	Ford Fiesta Rally2	Challenger Driver, Challenger Co-driver	P

Rally3 entries competing in the World Rally Championship-3 and/or the Junior World Rally Championship
No.	Driver	Co-Driver	Entrant	Car	Class eligibility	Tyre
63	(Turkey) Ali Türkkan	(Turkey) Burak Erdener	(Turkey) Ali Türkkan	Ford Fiesta Rally3	WRC-3	P
64	(Czech Republic) Filip Kohn	(United Kingdom) Tom Woodburn	(Czech Republic) Filip Kohn	Ford Fiesta Rally3	WRC-3	P
65	(Finland) Roope Korhonen	(Finland) Anssi Viinikka	(Finland) Rautio Motorsport	Ford Fiesta Rally3	WRC-3	P
66	(Republic of Ireland) William Creighton	(Republic of Ireland) Liam Regan	(Republic of Ireland) Motorsport Ireland Rally Academy	Ford Fiesta Rally3	WRC-3, Junior WRC	P
67	(France) Laurent Pellier	(France) Kévin Bronner	(France) Laurent Pellier	Ford Fiesta Rally3	WRC-3, Junior WRC	P
68	(Paraguay) Diego Dominguez Jr.	(Spain) Rogelio Peñate	(Paraguay) Diego Dominguez Jr.	Ford Fiesta Rally3	Junior WRC	P
70	(Belgium) Tom Rensonnet	(Belgium) Loïc Dumont	(Belgium) RACB National Team	Ford Fiesta Rally3	WRC-3, Junior WRC	P
71	(Spain) Roberto Blach Núñez	(Spain) Mauro Barreiro	(Spain) Roberto Blach Núñez	Ford Fiesta Rally3	WRC-3, Junior WRC	P
72	(Republic of Ireland) Eamonn Kelly	(Republic of Ireland) Conor Mohan	(Republic of Ireland) Motorsport Ireland Rally Academy	Ford Fiesta Rally3	WRC-3, Junior WRC	P
73	(Spain) Raúl Hernández	(Spain) Adrián Pérez Fernández	(Spain) Raúl Hernández	Ford Fiesta Rally3	Junior WRC	P
74	(Kenya) Hamza Anwar	(Kenya) Adnan Din	(Kenya) Hamza Anwar	Ford Fiesta Rally3	WRC-3, Junior WRC	P

Other major entries
No.	Driver	Co-Driver	Entrant	Car	Championship eligibility	Tyre
26	(Finland) Emil Lindholm	(Finland) Reeta Hämäläinen	(Germany) Toksport WRT	Škoda Fabia RS Rally2	—N/a	P
75	(Hungary) Zoltán László	(Hungary) Gábor Zsiros	(Hungary) Zoltán László	Škoda Fabia Rally2 evo	Masters Driver	P

=== Itinerary ===
All dates and times are CEST (UTC+2).

Date	No.	Time span	Stage name	Distance
1 June	—	After 9:01	Loiri Porto San Paolo [Shakedown]	2.87 km
1 June	SS1	After 18:05	Olbia – Cabu Abbas	3.23 km
2 June		7:40 – 8:00	Service A, Olbia	—N/a
2 June	SS2	After 8:40	Tantariles 20Ris 1	10.71 km
2 June	SS3	After 9:31	Terranova 1	8.41 km
2 June	SS4	After 10:21	Monte Lerno – Sa Conchedda 1	49.90 km
2 June		13:07 – 13:52	Service B, Olbia	—N/a
2 June	SS5	After 14:32	Tantariles 20Ris 2	10.71 km
2 June	SS6	After 15:23	Terranova 2	8.41 km
2 June	SS7	After 16:13	Monte Lerno – Sa Conchedda 2	49.90 km
2 June		18:19 – 19:04	Flexi service C, Olbia	—N/a
3 June	SS8	After 8:05	Coiluna – Loelle 1	16.28 km
3 June	SS9	After 9:03	Su Filigosu 1	19.57 km
3 June	SS10	After 10:08	Erula – Tula 1	21.92 km
3 June	SS11	After 11:22	Tempio Pausania 1	9.96 km
3 June		13:10 – 13:55	Service D, Olbia	—N/a
3 June	SS12	After 15:05	Coiluna – Loelle 2	16.28 km
3 June	SS13	After 16:03	Su Filigosu 2	19.57 km
3 June	SS14	After 17:30	Erula – Tula 2	21.92 km
3 June	SS15	After 18:44	Tempio Pausania 2	9.96 km
3 June		20:17 – 21:02	Flexi Service E, Olbia	—N/a
4 June	SS16	After 7:05	Arzachena – Braniatogghiu 1	15.22 km
4 June	SS17	After 8:05	Sardegna 1	7.79 km
4 June	SS18	After 10:09	Arzachena – Braniatogghiu 2	15.22 km
4 June	SS19	After 12:15	Sardegna 2 [Power Stage]	7.79 km
4 June		After 15:00	Podium ceremony, Olbia	—N/a

== Report ==
=== WRC Rally1 ===
==== Classification ====
Position		No.	Driver	Co-driver	Entrant	Car	Time	Difference	Points	
Event	Class	No.	Driver	Co-driver	Entrant	Car	Time	Difference	Event	Stage
1	1	11	Thierry Neuville	Martijn Wydaeghe	Hyundai Shell Mobis WRT	Hyundai i20 N Rally1	3:40:01.4	0.0	25	0
2	2	4	Esapekka Lappi	Janne Ferm	Hyundai Shell Mobis WRT	Hyundai i20 N Rally1	3:40:34.4	+33.0	18	0
3	3	69	Kalle Rovanperä	Jonne Halttunen	Toyota Gazoo Racing WRT	Toyota GR Yaris Rally1	3:41:56.7	+1:55.3	15	5
4	4	33	Elfyn Evans	Scott Martin	Toyota Gazoo Racing WRT	Toyota GR Yaris Rally1	3:45:21.9	+5:20.5	12	2
14	5	17	Sébastien Ogier	Vincent Landais	Toyota Gazoo Racing WRT	Toyota GR Yaris Rally1	3:59:51.8	+19:50.4	0	1
35	6	8	Ott Tänak	Martin Järveoja	M-Sport Ford WRT	Ford Puma Rally1	4:41:00.8	+1:00:59.4	0	4
40	7	18	Takamoto Katsuta	Aaron Johnston	Toyota Gazoo Racing WRT	Toyota GR Yaris Rally1	4:50:12.4	+1:10:11.0	0	3
Retired SS18		6	Dani Sordo	Cándido Carrera	Hyundai Shell Mobis WRT	Hyundai i20 N Rally1	Exhaust		0	0
Retired SS7		7	Pierre-Louis Loubet	Nicolas Gilsoul	M-Sport Ford WRT	Ford Puma Rally1	Accident		0	0

==== Special stages ====
Stage	Winners	Car	Time	Class leaders
SD	Lappi / Ferm	Hyundai i20 N Rally1	1:45.9	—N/a
SS1	Lappi / Ferm	Hyundai i20 N Rally1	2:24.9	Lappi / Ferm
SS2	Ogier / Landais	Toyota GR Yaris Rally1	7:19.2	Ogier / Landais
SS3	Katsuta / Johnston	Toyota GR Yaris Rally1	5:31.6	Lappi / Ferm
SS4	Ogier / Landais	Toyota GR Yaris Rally1	31:33.9	Ogier / Landais
SS5	Lappi / Ferm	Hyundai i20 N Rally1	7:08.9	Ogier / Landais
SS6	Neuville / Wydaeghe	Hyundai i20 N Rally1	5:29.1	Ogier / Landais
SS7	Rovanperä / Halttunen	Toyota GR Yaris Rally1	31:55.4	Lappi / Ferm
SS8	Neuville / Wydaeghe	Hyundai i20 N Rally1	10:01.6	Ogier / Landais
SS9	Neuville / Wydaeghe	Hyundai i20 N Rally1	12:45.0	Lappi / Ferm
SS10	Ogier / Landais	Toyota GR Yaris Rally1	18:45.7	Ogier / Landais
SS11	Neuville / Wydaeghe	Hyundai i20 N Rally1	6:53.2	Ogier / Landais
SS12	Lappi / Ferm	Hyundai i20 N Rally1	9:52.3	Ogier / Landais
SS13	Neuville / Wydaeghe	Hyundai i20 N Rally1	12:53.8	Ogier / Landais
SS14	Sordo / Carrera	Hyundai i20 N Rally1	19:31.6	Neuville / Wydaeghe
SS15	Neuville / Wydaeghe	Hyundai i20 N Rally1	7:23.1	Neuville / Wydaeghe
SS16	Tänak / Järveoja	Ford Puma Rally1	8:37.7	Neuville / Wydaeghe
SS17	Tänak / Järveoja	Ford Puma Rally1	5:37.1	Neuville / Wydaeghe
SS18	Katsuta / Johnston	Toyota GR Yaris Rally1	8:31.7	Neuville / Wydaeghe
SS19	Rovanperä / Halttunen	Toyota GR Yaris Rally1	5:55.0	Neuville / Wydaeghe

==== Championship standings ====
Pos.	Drivers' championships			Co-drivers' championships			Manufacturers' championships		
Pos.	Move	Driver	Points	Move	Co-driver	Points	Move	Manufacturer	Points
1		Kalle Rovanperä	118		Jonne Halttunen	118		Toyota Gazoo Racing WRT	235
2	2	Thierry Neuville	93	2	Martijn Wydaeghe	93		Hyundai Shell Mobis WRT	212
3	1	Ott Tänak	85	1	Martin Järveoja	85		M-Sport Ford WRT	148
4		Elfyn Evans	83		Scott Martin	83			
5	3	Sébastien Ogier	70	3	Vincent Landais	70			

=== WRC-2 Rally2 ===
==== Classification ====
Position		No.	Driver	Co-driver	Entrant	Car	Time	Difference	Points		
Event	Class	No.	Driver	Co-driver	Entrant	Car	Time	Difference	Class	Stage (Note: No Power Stage points were awarded for WRC-2 as the Power Stage was interrupted before all competitors could complete the stage.)	Event
5	1	23	Andreas Mikkelsen	Torstein Eriksen	Toksport WRT 3	Škoda Fabia RS Rally2	3:49:34.7	0.0	25	0	10
6	2	25	Teemu Suninen	Mikko Markkula	Hyundai Motorsport N	Hyundai i20 N Rally2	3:51:50.3	+2:15.6	18	0	8
7	3	29	Kajetan Kajetanowicz	Maciej Szczepaniak	Kajetan Kajetanowicz	Škoda Fabia RS Rally2	3:52:47.5	+3:12.8	15	0	6
8	4	20	Yohan Rossel	Arnaud Dunand	PH Sport	Citroën C3 Rally2	3:52:54.9	+3:20.2	12	0	4
9	5	37	Mikołaj Marczyk	Szymon Gospodarczyk	Mikołaj Marczyk	Škoda Fabia RS Rally2	3:55:35.2	+6:00.5	10	0	2
10	6	41	Erik Cais	Petr Těšínský	Erik Cais	Škoda Fabia RS Rally2	3:56:50.8	+7:16.1	8	0	1
11	7	30	Grégoire Munster	Louis Louka	M-Sport Ford WRT	Ford Fiesta Rally2	3:57:25.4	+7:50.7	6	0	0
12	8	39	Lauri Joona	Tuukka Shemeikka	Lauri Joona	Škoda Fabia Rally2 evo	3:58:08.4	+8:33.7	4	0	0
13	9	46	Martin Prokop	Michal Ernst	Martin Prokop	Škoda Fabia RS Rally2	3:59:23.9	+9:49.2	2	0	0
15	10	38	Josh McErlean	John Rowan	Motorsport Ireland Rally Academy	Hyundai i20 N Rally2	4:00:49.6	+11:14.9	1	0	0
16	11	57	Matteo Gamba	Nicolò Gonella	Matteo Gamba	Škoda Fabia Rally2 evo	4:12:17.4	+22:42.7	0	0	0
17	12	40	Robert Virves	Hugo Magalhães	Robert Virves	Ford Fiesta Rally2	4:13:11.3	+23:36.6	0	0	0
21	13	58	Nicola Tali	Massimiliano Frau	Nicola Tali	Škoda Fabia Rally2 evo	4:18:19.7	+28:45.0	0	0	0
22	14	50	Johannes Keferböck	Ilka Minor	Johannes Keferböck	Škoda Fabia Rally2 evo	4:20:03.1	+30:28.4	0	0	0
23	15	48	Eduardo Castro	Fernando Mussano	Eduardo Castro	Škoda Fabia Rally2 evo	4:22:20.5	+32:45.8	0	0	0
24	16	31	Fabrizio Zaldivar	Marcelo Der Ohannesian	Hyundai Motorsport N	Hyundai i20 N Rally2	4:25:59.1	+36:24.4	0	0	0
26	17	47	Mauro Miele	Luca Beltrame	Mauro Miele	Škoda Fabia RS Rally2	4:27:01.0	+37:26.3	0	0	0
28	18	59	Pablo Biolghini	Stefano Pudda	Pablo Biolghini	Škoda Fabia Rally2 evo	4:29:10.7	+39:36.0	0	0	0
29	19	32	Sami Pajari	Enni Mälkönen	Toksport WRT	Škoda Fabia RS Rally2	4:31:18.4	+41:43.7	0	0	0
33	20	28	Nicolas Ciamin	Yannick Roche	Nicolas Ciamin	Volkswagen Polo GTI R5	4:36:18.2	+46:43.5	0	0	0
34	21	24	Nikolay Gryazin	Konstantin Aleksandrov	Toksport WRT 2	Škoda Fabia RS Rally2	4:37:34.0	+47:59.3	0	0	0
36	22	53	Daniel Chwist	Kamil Heller	Daniel Chwist	Škoda Fabia Rally2 evo	4:42:43.3	+53:08.6	0	0	0
38	23	52	Alexander Villanueva	José Murado González	Alexander Villanueva	Škoda Fabia RS Rally2	4:45:25.8	+55:51.1	0	0	0
41	24	61	Carlo Covi	Andrea Budoia	Carlo Covi	Škoda Fabia Rally2 evo	4:50:50.9	+1:01:16.2	0	0	0
42	25	56	Giuseppe Dettori	Carlo Pisano	Giuseppe Dettori	Škoda Fabia R5	4:53:06.9	+1:03:32.2	0	0	0
44	26	22	Oliver Solberg	Elliott Edmondson	Oliver Solberg	Škoda Fabia RS Rally2	5:03:53.6	+1:14:18.9	0	0	0
48	27	55	Nasser Khalifa Al-Attiyah	Giovanni Bernacchini	Nasser Khalifa Al-Attiyah	Ford Fiesta Rally2	5:11:43.2	+1:22:08.5	0	0	0
54	28	49	Patrick O'Brien	Stephen O'Brien	Motorsport Ireland Rally Academy	Hyundai i20 N Rally2	5:51:29.7	+2:01:55.0	0	0	0
56	29	60	Maurizio Morato	Andrea Dal Maso	Maurizio Morato	Škoda Fabia R5	6:19:12.4	+2:29:37.7	0	0	0
Retired SS19		27	Adrien Fourmaux	Alexandre Coria	M-Sport Ford WRT	Ford Fiesta Rally2	Accident damage		0	0	0
Retired SS15		34	Bruno Bulacia	Axel Coronado Jiménez	Bruno Bulacia	Škoda Fabia Rally2 Evo	Mechanical		0	0	0
Retired SS11		45	Armin Kremer	Timo Gottschalk	Armin Kremer	Škoda Fabia RS Rally2	Brakes		0	0	0
Retired SS10		35	Alejandro Cachón	Alejandro López Fernández	Alejandro Cachón	Citroën C3 Rally2	Retired		0	0	0
Retired SS5		21	Gus Greensmith	Jonas Andersson	Toksport WRT 3	Škoda Fabia RS Rally2	Accident		0	0	0
Retired SS1		62	Francesco Tali	Chiara Corso	Francesco Tali	Ford Fiesta Rally2	Accident		0	0	0

==== Special stages ====
Overall
Stage	Winners	Car	Time	Class leaders
SD	Fourmaux / Coria	Ford Fiesta Rally2	1:50.7	—N/a
SS1	Solberg / Edmondson	Škoda Fabia RS Rally2	2:29.5	Solberg / Edmondson
SS2	Solberg / Edmondson	Škoda Fabia RS Rally2	7:30.5	Solberg / Edmondson
SS3	Suninen / Markkula	Hyundai i20 N Rally2	5:47.1	Mikkelsen / Eriksen
SS4	Suninen / Markkula	Hyundai i20 N Rally2	32:51.8	Suninen / Markkula
SS5	Stage interrupted			
SS6	Fourmaux / Coria	Ford Fiesta Rally2	5:48.7	Suninen / Markkula
SS7	Solberg / Edmondson	Škoda Fabia RS Rally2	33:16.3	Pajari / Mälkönen
SS8	Solberg / Edmondson	Škoda Fabia RS Rally2	10:24.9	Pajari / Mälkönen
SS9	Mikkelsen / Eriksen	Škoda Fabia RS Rally2	13:18.9	Fourmaux / Coria
SS10	Fourmaux / Coria	Ford Fiesta Rally2	19:28.4	Fourmaux / Coria
SS11	Mikkelsen / Eriksen	Škoda Fabia RS Rally2	7:09.2	Fourmaux / Coria
SS12	Solberg / Edmondson	Škoda Fabia RS Rally2	10:17.0	Fourmaux / Coria
SS13	Suninen / Markkula	Hyundai i20 N Rally2	13:36.1	Fourmaux / Coria
SS14	Fourmaux / Coria	Ford Fiesta Rally2	20:41.5	Fourmaux / Coria
SS15	Fourmaux / Coria	Ford Fiesta Rally2	7:32.1	Fourmaux / Coria
SS16	Pajari / Mälkönen	Škoda Fabia RS Rally2	8:46.2	Fourmaux / Coria
SS17	Gryazin / Aleksandrov	Škoda Fabia RS Rally2	5:51.1	Fourmaux / Coria
SS18	Pajari / Mälkönen	Škoda Fabia RS Rally2	8:39.9	Fourmaux / Coria
SS19	Munster / Louka	Ford Fiesta Rally2	6:26.3	Mikkelsen / Eriksen

Challenger
Stage	Winners	Car	Time	Class leaders
SD	Gryazin / Aleksandrov	Škoda Fabia RS Rally2	1:53.6	—N/a
SS1	Marczyk / Gospodarczyk	Škoda Fabia RS Rally2	2:29.7	Marczyk / Gospodarczyk
SS2	Marczyk / Gospodarczyk	Škoda Fabia RS Rally2	7:38.9	Marczyk / Gospodarczyk
SS3	Pajari / Mälkönen	Škoda Fabia RS Rally2	5:52.4	Marczyk / Gospodarczyk
SS4	Pajari / Mälkönen	Škoda Fabia RS Rally2	32:55.4	Pajari / Mälkönen
SS5	Stage interrupted			
SS6	Stage interrupted			
SS7	Pajari / Mälkönen	Škoda Fabia RS Rally2	33:16.7	Pajari / Mälkönen
SS8	Pajari / Mälkönen	Škoda Fabia RS Rally2	10:33.4	Pajari / Mälkönen
SS9	Kajetanowicz / Szczepaniak	Škoda Fabia RS Rally2	13:31.4	Pajari / Mälkönen
SS10	Kajetanowicz / Szczepaniak	Škoda Fabia RS Rally2	19:47.9	Pajari / Mälkönen
SS11	Kajetanowicz / Szczepaniak	Škoda Fabia RS Rally2	7:10.4	Kajetanowicz / Szczepaniak
SS12	Kajetanowicz / Szczepaniak	Škoda Fabia RS Rally2	10:22.7	Kajetanowicz / Szczepaniak
SS13	Virves / Magalhães	Ford Fiesta Rally2	13:44.5	Kajetanowicz / Szczepaniak
SS14	Gryazin / Aleksandrov	Škoda Fabia RS Rally2	21:17.1	Kajetanowicz / Szczepaniak
SS15	Kajetanowicz / Szczepaniak	Škoda Fabia RS Rally2	8:00.3	Kajetanowicz / Szczepaniak
SS16	Pajari / Mälkönen	Škoda Fabia RS Rally2	8:46.2	Kajetanowicz / Szczepaniak
SS17	Gryazin / Aleksandrov	Škoda Fabia RS Rally2	5:51.1	Kajetanowicz / Szczepaniak
SS18	Pajari / Mälkönen	Škoda Fabia RS Rally2	8:39.9	Kajetanowicz / Szczepaniak
SS19	Munster / Louka	Ford Fiesta Rally2	6:26.3	Kajetanowicz / Szczepaniak

==== Championship standings ====
Pos.	Open Drivers' championships			Open Co-drivers' championships			Teams' championships			Challenger Drivers' championships			Challenger Co-drivers' championships		
Pos.	Move	Driver	Points	Move	Co-driver	Points	Move	Manufacturer	Points	Move	Manufacturer	Points	Move	Driver	Points
1		Yohan Rossel	77		Arnaud Dunand	77	1	M-Sport Ford WRT	91		Nikolay Gryazin	50		Konstantin Aleksandrov	50
2	1	Oliver Solberg	64	1	Elliott Edmondson	64	1	Toksport WRT	80	2	Kajetan Kajetanowicz	50	3	Maciej Szczepaniak	50
3	1	Gus Greensmith	62	1	Jonas Andersson	62	1	Hyundai Motorsport N	73	1	Marco Bulacia	50	1	Enni Mälkönen	43
4		Emil Lindholm	44	7	Torstein Eriksen	61	1	Toksport WRT 3	68	1	Sami Pajari	43	1	Diego Vallejo	40
5	6	Andreas Mikkelsen	42	1	Reeta Hämäläinen	44	2	Toksport WRT 2	65		Lauri Joona	32	1	Borja Rozada	33

=== WRC-3 Rally3 ===
==== Classification ====
Position		No.	Driver	Co-driver	Entrant	Car	Time	Difference	Points
Event	Class	No.	Driver	Co-driver	Entrant	Car	Time	Difference	Points
18	1	65	Roope Korhonen	Anssi Viinikka	Rautio Motorsport	Ford Fiesta Rally3	4:14:20.0	0.0	25
19	2	66	William Creighton	Liam Regan	Motorsport Ireland Rally Academy	Ford Fiesta Rally3	4:15:11.5	+51.5	18
30	3	63	Ali Türkkan	Burak Erdener	Ali Türkkan	Ford Fiesta Rally3	4:34:08.7	+19:48.7	15
31	4	71	Roberto Blach Núñez	Mauro Barreiro	Roberto Blach Núñez	Ford Fiesta Rally3	4:34:15.1	+19:55.1	12
32	5	67	Laurent Pellier	Kévin Bronner	Laurent Pellier	Ford Fiesta Rally3	4:36:15.1	+21:55.1	10
37	6	70	Tom Rensonnet	Loïc Dumont	RACB National Team	Ford Fiesta Rally3	4:44:09.5	+29:49.5	8
43	7	72	Eamonn Kelly	Conor Mohan	Motorsport Ireland Rally Academy	Ford Fiesta Rally3	4:53:47.2	+39:27.2	6
50	8	74	Hamza Anwar	Adnan Din	Hamza Anwar	Ford Fiesta Rally3	5:22:22.6	+1:08:02.6	4
53	9	64	Filip Kohn	Tom Woodburn	Filip Kohn	Ford Fiesta Rally3	5:36:58.0	+1:22:38.0	2

==== Special stages ====
Stage	Winners	Car	Time	Class leaders
SD	Korhonen / Viinikka	Ford Fiesta Rally3	2:01.6	—N/a
SS1	Korhonen / Viinikka	Ford Fiesta Rally3	2:39.9	Korhonen / Viinikka
SS2	Pellier / Bronner	Ford Fiesta Rally3	8:13.4	Korhonen / Viinikka
SS3	Pellier / Bronner	Ford Fiesta Rally3	6:22.2	Pellier / Bronner
SS4	Kohn / Woodburn	Ford Fiesta Rally3	36:30.3	Korhonen / Viinikka
SS5	Stage interrupted			
SS6	Stage interrupted			
SS7	Kohn / Woodburn	Ford Fiesta Rally3	37:01.5	Korhonen / Viinikka
SS8	Pellier / Bronner	Ford Fiesta Rally3	11:16.8	Creighton / Regan
SS9	Creighton / Regan	Ford Fiesta Rally3	14:28.1	Creighton / Regan
SS10	Pellier / Bronner	Ford Fiesta Rally3	20:29.9	Creighton / Regan
SS11	Pellier / Bronner	Ford Fiesta Rally3	7:32.5	Creighton / Regan
SS12	Pellier / Bronner	Ford Fiesta Rally3	11:13.0	Creighton / Regan
SS13	Pellier / Bronner	Ford Fiesta Rally3	15:29.2	Korhonen / Viinikka
SS14	Creighton / Regan	Ford Fiesta Rally3	21:43.4	Korhonen / Viinikka
SS15	Creighton / Regan	Ford Fiesta Rally3	8:25.0	Korhonen / Viinikka
SS16	Korhonen / Viinikka	Ford Fiesta Rally3	9:32.9	Korhonen / Viinikka
SS17	Pellier / Bronner	Ford Fiesta Rally3	6:18.7	Korhonen / Viinikka
SS18	Pellier / Bronner	Ford Fiesta Rally3	9:29.9	Korhonen / Viinikka
SS19	Stage cancelled			

==== Championship standings ====
Pos.	Drivers' championships			Co-drivers' championships		
Pos.	Move	Driver	Points	Move	Co-driver	Points
1		Roope Korhonen	75		Anssi Viinikka	75
2	1	William Creighton	46	1	Liam Regan	46
3	1	Diego Dominguez Jr.	37	1	Rogelio Peñate	37
4		Tom Rensonnet	36		Loïc Dumont	36
5		Eamonn Kelly	31		Conor Mohan	31

=== J-WRC Rally3 ===
==== Classification ====
Position		No.	Driver	Co-driver	Entrant	Car	Time	Difference	Points	
Event	Class	No.	Driver	Co-driver	Entrant	Car	Time	Difference	Class	Stage
19	1	66	William Creighton	Liam Regan	Motorsport Ireland Rally Academy	Ford Fiesta Rally3	4:15:11.5	0.0	25	4
20	2	68	Diego Dominguez Jr.	Rogelio Peñate	Diego Dominguez Jr.	Ford Fiesta Rally3	4:16:57.4	+1:45.9	18	2
31	3	71	Roberto Blach Núñez	Mauro Barreiro	Roberto Blach Núñez	Ford Fiesta Rally3	4:34:15.1	+19:03.6	15	0
32	4	67	Laurent Pellier	Kévin Bronner	Laurent Pellier	Ford Fiesta Rally3	4:36:15.1	+21:03.6	12	5
37	5	70	Tom Rensonnet	Loïc Dumont	RACB National Team	Ford Fiesta Rally3	4:44:09.5	+28:58.0	10	0
43	6	72	Eamonn Kelly	Conor Mohan	Motorsport Ireland Rally Academy	Ford Fiesta Rally3	4:53:47.2	+35:35.7	8	0
47	7	73	Raúl Hernández	Adrián Pérez Fernández	Raúl Hernández	Ford Fiesta Rally3	5:10:47.7	+55:36.2	6	5
50	8	74	Hamza Anwar	Adnan Din	Hamza Anwar	Ford Fiesta Rally3	5:22:22.6	+1:07:11.1	4	0

==== Special stages ====
Stage	Winners	Car	Time	Class leaders
SD	Dominguez / Peñate	Ford Fiesta Rally3	2:02.5	—N/a
SS1	Creighton / Regan	Ford Fiesta Rally3	2:40.7	Creighton / Regan
SS2	Pellier / Bronner	Ford Fiesta Rally3	8:13.4	Dominguez / Peñate
SS3	Hernández / Pérez Fernández	Ford Fiesta Rally3	6:17.2	Dominguez / Peñate
SS4	Dominguez / Peñate	Ford Fiesta Rally3	35:27.8	Dominguez / Peñate
SS5	Stage interrupted			
SS6	Stage interrupted			
SS7	Hernández / Pérez Fernández	Ford Fiesta Rally3	38:59.7	Creighton / Regan
SS8	Pellier / Bronner	Ford Fiesta Rally3	11:16.8	Creighton / Regan
SS9	Creighton / Regan	Ford Fiesta Rally3	14:28.1	Creighton / Regan
SS10	Pellier / Bronner	Ford Fiesta Rally3	20:29.9	Creighton / Regan
SS11	Pellier / Bronner	Ford Fiesta Rally3	7:32.5	Creighton / Regan
SS12	Dominguez / Peñate	Ford Fiesta Rally3	11:11.5	Creighton / Regan
SS13	Pellier / Bronner	Ford Fiesta Rally3	15:29.2	Dominguez / Peñate
SS14	Creighton / Regan	Ford Fiesta Rally3	21:43.4	Creighton / Regan
SS15	Creighton / Regan	Ford Fiesta Rally3	8:25.0	Creighton / Regan
SS16	Hernández / Pérez Fernández	Ford Fiesta Rally3	9:40.2	Creighton / Regan
SS17	Hernández / Pérez Fernández	Ford Fiesta Rally3	6:11.7	Creighton / Regan
SS18	Hernández / Pérez Fernández	Ford Fiesta Rally3	9:27.9	Creighton / Regan
SS19	Stage cancelled			

==== Championship standings ====
Pos.	Drivers' championships			Co-drivers' championships		
Pos.	Move	Driver	Points	Move	Co-driver	Points
1		William Creighton	79		Liam Regan	79
2	1	Diego Dominguez Jr.	47	1	Rogelio Peñate	47
3	1	Laurent Pellier	46	2	Mauro Barreiro	41
4	1	Roberto Blach	41		Loïc Dumont	36
5	1	Tom Rensonnet	36	1	Conor Mohan	33

== Notes ==
Previous rally: 2023 Rally de Portugal	2023 FIA World Rally Championship	Next rally: 2023 Safari Rally
Previous rally: 2022 Rally Italia Sardegna	2023 Rally Italia Sardegna	Next rally: 2024 Rally Italia Sardegna
