= 2023 Acropolis Rally =

67th edition of Acropolis Rally

2023 Acropolis Rally EKO Acropolis Rally Greece 2023
Round 10 of 13 in the 2023 World Rally Championship
← Previous event	Next event →
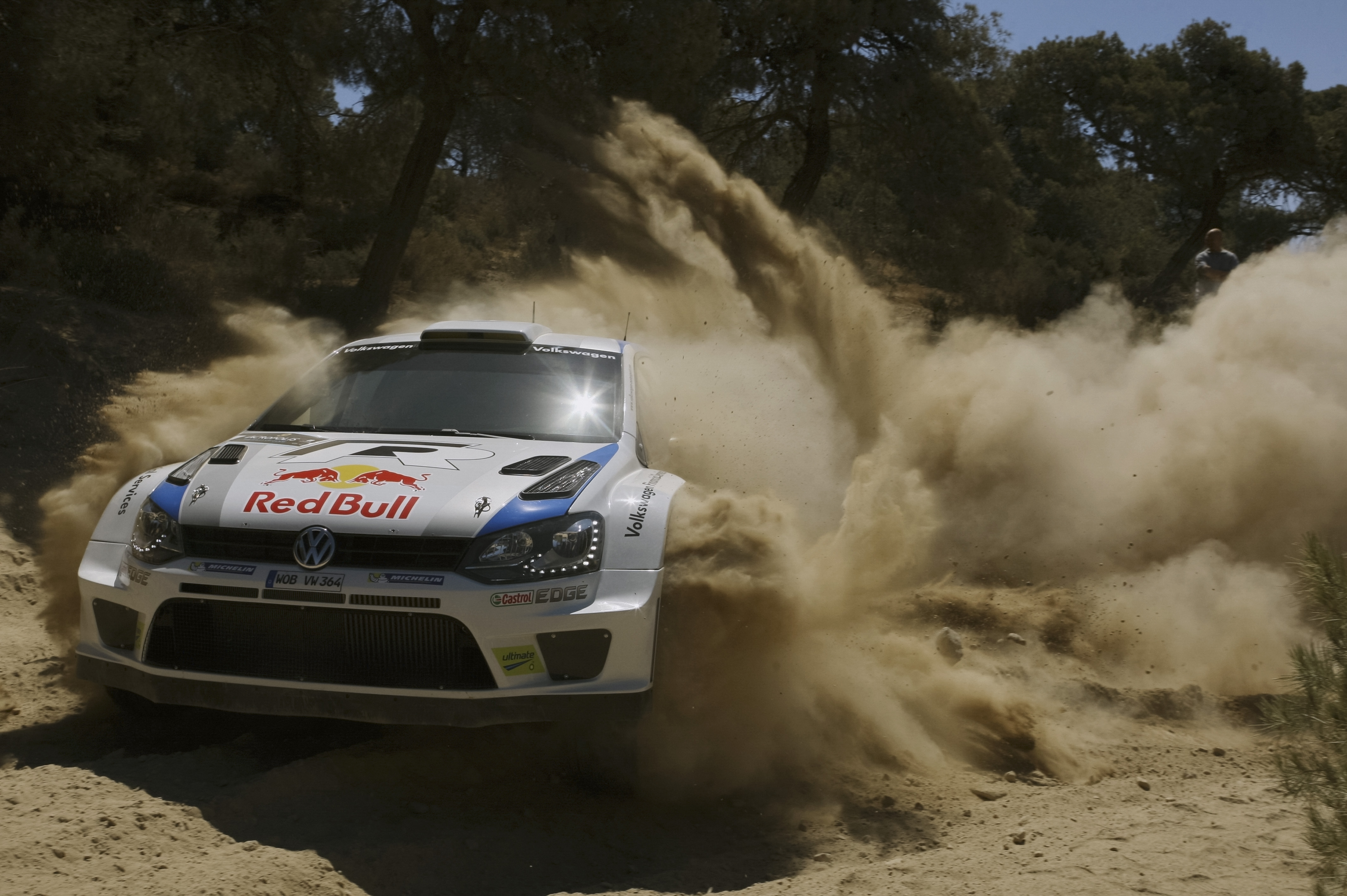
- Twisty gravel mountain roads, high temperatures and choking dust are the challenges of the event.
- Host country: Greece
- Rally base: Lamia, Central Greece
- Dates run: 7 – 10 September 2023
- Start location: Athens, Attica
- Finish location: Kalamaki, Central Greece
- Stages: 15 (270.89 km; 168.32 miles)
- Stage surface: Gravel
- Transport distance: 989.26 km (614.70 miles)
- Overall distance: 1,260.15 km (783.02 miles)

Statistics
- Crews registered: 72
- Crews: 69 at start, 52 at finish

Overall results
- Overall winner: (Finland) Kalle Rovanperä (Finland) Jonne Halttunen (Japan) Toyota Gazoo Racing WRT; 3:00:16.7
- Power Stage winner: (Finland) Kalle Rovanperä (Finland) Jonne Halttunen (Japan) Toyota Gazoo Racing WRT; 6:28.1

Support category results
- WRC-2 winner: (Norway) Andreas Mikkelsen (Norway) Torstein Eriksen (Germany) Toksport WRT 3; 3:09:57.7
- WRC-3 winner: (Paraguay) Diego Dominguez Jr (Spain) Rogelio Peñate; 3:24:38.9
- J-WRC winner: (Paraguay) Diego Dominguez Jr (Spain) Rogelio Peñate; 3:24:38.9

The 2023 Acropolis Rally (also known as the EKO Acropolis Rally Greece 2023) was a motor racing event for rally cars held from 7 September to 10 September 2023. It marked the sixty-seventh running of the Acropolis Rally, and was the tenth round of the 2023 World Rally Championship, World Rally Championship-2 and World Rally Championship-3. The event was also the final round of the 2023 Junior World Rally Championship. The event was based in Lamia in Central Greece, and was contested over fifteen special stages covering a total competitive distance of 307.69 km (191.19 mi).

Thierry Neuville and Martijn Wydaeghe were the defending rally winners. Hyundai Shell Mobis WRT, were the defending manufacturers' winners. Emil Lindholm and Reeta Hämäläinen were the defending rally winners in the WRC-2 category. Diego Dominguez Jr. and Rogelio Peñate were the defending rally winners in the WRC-3 category. Robert Virves and Julia Thulin were the defending rally winners in the junior championship.

Kalle Rovanperä and Jonne Halttunen won their third rally of the season. Their team, Toyota Gazoo Racing WRT, were the manufacturer's winners. Andreas Mikkelsen and Torstein Eriksen won the World Rally Championship-2 category. Dominguez Jr and Peñate successfully defended their titles in the World Rally Championship-3 category, as well as winning the junior class. At the conclusion of the junior championship, the Irish crew of William Creighton and Liam Regan became the 2023 Junior Rally Champions.

== Background ==
=== Entry list ===
The following crews entered into the rally. The event was opened to crews competing in the World Rally Championship, its support categories, the World Rally Championship-2, World Rally Championship-3, Junior World Rally Championship and privateer entries that were not registered to score points in any championship. Nine entered under Rally1 regulations, as were twenty-eight Rally2 crews in the World Rally Championship-2 and thirteen Rally3 crews in the World Rally Championship-3. A total of eight crews registered to participate in the Junior World Rally Championship.

Rally1 entries competing in the World Rally Championship
No.	Driver	Co-Driver	Entrant	Car	Championship eligibility	Tyre
4	(Finland) Esapekka Lappi	(Finland) Janne Ferm	(South Korea) Hyundai Shell Mobis WRT	Hyundai i20 N Rally1	Driver, Co-driver, Manufacturer	P
6	(Spain) Dani Sordo	(Spain) Cándido Carrera	(South Korea) Hyundai Shell Mobis WRT	Hyundai i20 N Rally1	Driver, Co-driver, Manufacturer	P
7	(France) Pierre-Louis Loubet	(Belgium) Nicolas Gilsoul	(United Kingdom) M-Sport Ford WRT	Ford Puma Rally1	Driver, Co-driver, Manufacturer	P
8	(Estonia) Ott Tänak	(Estonia) Martin Järveoja	(United Kingdom) M-Sport Ford WRT	Ford Puma Rally1	Driver, Co-driver, Manufacturer	P
9	(Greece) Jourdan Serderidis	(Belgium) Frédéric Miclotte	(United Kingdom) M-Sport Ford WRT	Ford Puma Rally1	Driver, Co-driver	P
11	(Belgium) Thierry Neuville	(Belgium) Martijn Wydaeghe	(South Korea) Hyundai Shell Mobis WRT	Hyundai i20 N Rally1	Driver, Co-driver, Manufacturer	P
17	(France) Sébastien Ogier	(France) Vincent Landais	(Japan) Toyota Gazoo Racing WRT	Toyota GR Yaris Rally1	Driver, Co-driver, Manufacturer	P
18	(Japan) Takamoto Katsuta	(Republic of Ireland) Aaron Johnston	(Japan) Toyota Gazoo Racing WRT	Toyota GR Yaris Rally1	Driver, Co-driver	P
33	(United Kingdom) Elfyn Evans	(United Kingdom) Scott Martin	(Japan) Toyota Gazoo Racing WRT	Toyota GR Yaris Rally1	Driver, Co-driver, Manufacturer	P
69	(Finland) Kalle Rovanperä	(Finland) Jonne Halttunen	(Japan) Toyota Gazoo Racing WRT	Toyota GR Yaris Rally1	Driver, Co-driver, Manufacturer	P

Rally2 entries competing in the World Rally Championship-2
No.	Driver	Co-Driver	Entrant	Car	Championship eligibility	Tyre
20	(Norway) Andreas Mikkelsen	(Norway) Torstein Eriksen	(Germany) Toksport WRT 3	Škoda Fabia RS Rally2	Driver, Co-driver, Team	P
21	(France) Yohan Rossel	(France) Arnaud Dunand	(France) PH Sport	Citroën C3 Rally2	Driver, Co-driver	P
22	(Finland) Sami Pajari	(Finland) Enni Mälkönen	(Germany) Toksport WRT 2	Škoda Fabia RS Rally2	Challenger Driver, Challenger Co-Driver, Team	P
23	(Sweden) Oliver Solberg	(United Kingdom) Elliott Edmondson	(Sweden) Oliver Solberg	Škoda Fabia RS Rally2	Driver, Co-driver	P
24	(United Kingdom) Gus Greensmith	(Sweden) Jonas Andersson	(Germany) Toksport WRT 3	Škoda Fabia RS Rally2	Driver, Co-driver, Team	P
25	(Poland) Kajetan Kajetanowicz	(Poland) Maciej Szczepaniak	(Poland) Kajetan Kajetanowicz	Škoda Fabia RS Rally2	Challenger Driver, Challenger Co-driver	P
26	Nikolay Gryazin (Note: Nikolay Gryazin is Russian, but he competes as a neutral competitor using the ANA flag as Russian national emblems were banned by the association due to the Russian invasion of Ukraine.)	Konstantin Aleksandrov (Note: Konstantin Aleksandrov is Russian, but he competes as a neutral competitor using the ANA flag as Russian national emblems were banned by the association due to the Russian invasion of Ukraine.)	(Germany) Toksport WRT 2	Škoda Fabia RS Rally2	Team	P
27	(France) Adrien Fourmaux	(France) Alexandre Coria	(United Kingdom) M-Sport Ford WRT	Ford Fiesta Rally2	Driver, Co-driver, Team	P
28	(Bolivia) Marco Bulacia	(Spain) Diego Vallejo	(Germany) Toksport WRT	Škoda Fabia RS Rally2	Challenger Driver, Challenger Co-driver	P
29	(Czech Republic) Martin Prokop	(Czech Republic) Michal Ernst	(Czech Republic) Martin Prokop	Ford Fiesta Rally2	Challenger Driver, Challenger Co-driver	P
30	(Poland) Mikołaj Marczyk	(Poland) Szymon Gospodarczyk	(Poland) Mikołaj Marczyk	Škoda Fabia RS Rally2	Challenger Driver, Challenger Co-driver	P
31	(Estonia) Georg Linnamäe	(United Kingdom) James Morgan	(Estonia) Georg Linnamäe	Hyundai i20 N Rally2	Challenger Driver, Challenger Co-driver	P
32	(Luxembourg) Grégoire Munster	(Belgium) Louis Louka	(United Kingdom) M-Sport Ford WRT	Ford Fiesta Rally2	Challenger Driver, Challenger Co-driver, Team	P
34	(Finland) Lauri Joona	(Finland) Tuukka Shemeikka	(Finland) Lauri Joona	Škoda Fabia RS Rally2	Challenger Driver, Challenger Co-driver	P
35	(Estonia) Robert Virves	(United Kingdom) Craig Drew	(Estonia) Robert Virves	Ford Fiesta Rally2	Challenger Driver, Challenger Co-driver	P
36	(Greece) Alexandros Tsouloftas	(Cyprus) Stelios Elia	(Greece) Alexandros Tsouloftas	Volkswagen Polo GTI R5	Challenger Driver, Challenger Co-driver	P
37	(Greece) Lambros Athanassoulas	(Greece) Nikolaos Zakheos	(Greece) Lambros Athanassoulas	Hyundai i20 N Rally2	Challenger Driver, Challenger Co-driver	P
38	(Spain) Alejandro Cachón	(Spain) Alejandro López Fernández	(Spain) Alejandro Cachón	Citroën C3 Rally2	Challenger Driver, Challenger Co-driver	P
39	(Spain) Alexander Villanueva	(Spain) José Murado González	(Spain) Alexander Villanueva	Škoda Fabia RS Rally2	Challenger/Masters Driver, Challenger Co-driver	P
40	(Austria) Johannes Keferböck	(Austria) Ilka Minor	(Austria) Johannes Keferböck	Škoda Fabia Rally2 evo	Challenger/Masters Driver, Co-driver	—N/a
41	(Saudi Arabia) Rakan Al-Rashed	(Portugal) Hugo Magalhães	(Saudi Arabia) Rakan Al-Rashed	Škoda Fabia RS Rally2	Challenger Driver, Challenger Co-driver	—N/a
44	(India) Gaurav Gill	(France) Florian Barral	(India) Gaurav Gill	Škoda Fabia Rally2 evo	Challenger Driver, Challenger Co-driver	P
45	(Greece) Giorgos Kechagias	(Greece) Christos Kouzionis	(Greece) Giorgos Kechagias	Škoda Fabia Rally2 evo	Challenger Driver, Challenger Co-driver	P
46	(Greece) Panagiotis Roustemis	(Greece) Nikolaos Petropoulos	(Greece) Panagiotis Roustemis	Škoda Fabia RS Rally2	Challenger Driver, Challenger Co-driver	P
47	(Greece) Vassileios Velanis	(Greece) Ioannis Velanis	(Greece) Vassileios Velanis	Škoda Fabia Rally2 evo	Challenger Driver, Challenger Co-driver	P
48	(Greece) Chrisostomos Karellis	(Greece) Elias Panagiotounis	(Greece) Chrisostomos Karellis	Citroën C3 Rally2	Challenger Driver, Challenger Co-driver	P
49	(Greece) Marios Xanthakos	(Greece) Nikos Karathanassis	(Greece) Marios Xanthakos	Škoda Fabia R5	Challenger Driver, Challenger Co-driver	P
50	(Spain) Miguel Díaz-Aboitiz	(Spain) Diego Sanjuan de Eusebio	(Spain) Miguel Díaz-Aboitiz	Škoda Fabia Rally2 evo	Challenger/Masters Driver, Challenger Co-driver	P
51	(Greece) George Vassilakis	(Greece) Nikos Intzoglou	(Greece) George Vassilakis	Ford Fiesta R5	Challenger/Masters Driver, Challenger Co-driver	P
52	(Qatar) Nasser Khalifa Al-Attiyah	(Italy) Giovanni Bernacchini	(Qatar) Nasser Khalifa Al-Attiyah	Ford Fiesta Rally2	Challenger/Masters Driver, Challenger Co-driver	—N/a
67	(Greece) Yorgo Philippedes	(United Kingdom) Stuart Loudon	(Greece) Yorgo Philippedes	Škoda Fabia Rally2 evo	Challenger Driver, Challenger Co-driver	P

Rally3 entries competing in the World Rally Championship-3 and/or the Junior World Rally Championship
No.	Driver	Co-Driver	Entrant	Car	Class eligibility	Tyre
53	(Greece) Epaminondas Karanikolas	(Greece) Giorgos Kakavas	(Greece) Epaminondas Karanikolas	Ford Fiesta Rally3	WRC-3	P
54	(Greece) Efthimios Halkias	(Greece) Nikos Komnos	(Greece) Efthimios Halkias	Renault Clio Rally3	WRC-3	P
55	(Greece) Spiros Galerakis	(Greece) Konstantinos Soukoulis	(Greece) Spiros Galerakis	Ford Fiesta Rally3	WRC-3	P
56	(Greece) Giorgos Delaportas	(Greece) Evangelos Panaritis	(Greece) Giorgos Delaportas	Ford Fiesta Rally3	WRC-3	P
57	(Peru) Eduardo Castro	(Spain) Carla Salvat Trías	(Peru) Eduardo Castro	Ford Fiesta Rally3	WRC-3	P
58	(Turkey) Ali Türkkan	(Turkey) Burak Erdener	(Turkey) Castrol Ford Team Türkiye	Ford Fiesta Rally3	WRC-3	P
59	(Paraguay) Diego Dominguez Jr	(Spain) Rogelio Peñate	(Paraguay) Diego Dominguez Jr	Ford Fiesta Rally3	WRC-3, Junior WRC	P
60	(Republic of Ireland) William Creighton	(Republic of Ireland) Liam Regan	(Republic of Ireland) Motorsport Ireland Rally Academy	Ford Fiesta Rally3	WRC-3, Junior WRC	P
61	(France) Laurent Pellier	(France) Kévin Bronner	(France) Laurent Pellier	Ford Fiesta Rally3	WRC-3, Junior WRC	P
62	(Belgium) Tom Rensonnet	(Belgium) Loïc Dumont	(Belgium) RACB National Team	Ford Fiesta Rally3	WRC-3, Junior WRC	P
63	(Spain) Roberto Blach Núñez	(Spain) Mauro Barreiro	(Spain) Roberto Blach Núñez	Ford Fiesta Rally3	WRC-3, Junior WRC	P
64	(Republic of Ireland) Eamonn Kelly	(Republic of Ireland) Conor Mohan	(Republic of Ireland) Motorsport Ireland Rally Academy	Ford Fiesta Rally3	WRC-3, Junior WRC	P
65	(Kenya) Hamza Anwar	(Sweden) Julia Thulin	(Kenya) Hamza Anwar	Ford Fiesta Rally3	WRC-3, Junior WRC	P
66	(Bolivia) Nataniel Bruun Sosa	(Argentina) Claudio Bustos	(Bolivia) Nataniel Bruun Sosa	Ford Fiesta Rally3	Junior WRC	P

=== Itinerary ===
All dates and times are EEST (UTC+3).

Date	No.	Time span	Stage name	Distance
7 September	—	After 8:01	Lamia [Shakedown]	3.62 km
7 September		After 17:30	Opening ceremony, Acropolis	—N/a
7 September	SS1	After 19:05	EKO Super Special Stage	1.48 km
8 September	SS2	After 8:23	Loutraki 1	18.10 km
8 September	SS3	After 9:26	Pissia	16.43 km
8 September		11:41 – 11:56	Tyre fitting zone, Casino Loutraki	—N/a
8 September	SS4	After 12:19	Loutraki 2	18.10 km
8 September	SS5	After 15:12	Livadia	21.03 km
8 September	SS6	After 16:45	Elatia	28.32 km
8 September		17:25 – 18:10	Flexi service A, Lamia	—N/a
9 September	SS7	After 7:08	Pavliani 1	24.25 km
9 September	SS8	After 8:41	Karoutes 1	28.49 km
9 September	SS9	After 11:05	Eleftherochori 1	18.02 km
9 September		12:30 – 13:00	Flexi service B, Lamia	—N/a
9 September	SS10	After 14:08	Pavliani 2	24.25 km
9 September	SS11	After 15:41	Karoutes 2	28.49 km
9 September	SS12	After 18:05	Eleftherochori 2	18.02 km
9 September		19:15 – 20:00	Flexi service C, Lamia	—N/a
10 September	SS13	After 8:52	Tarzan	23.37 km
10 September	SS14	After 10:05	Grammeni 1	19.67 km
10 September		12:17 – 12:32	Flexi service D, Lamia	—N/a
10 September	SS15	After 13:15	Grammeni 2 [Power Stage]	19.67 km
10 September		After 15:55	Podium ceremony, Lamia	—N/a

== Report ==
=== WRC Rally1 ===
==== Classification ====
Position		No.	Driver	Co-driver	Entrant	Car	Time	Difference	Points	
Event	Class	No.	Driver	Co-driver	Entrant	Car	Time	Difference	Event	Stage
1	1	69	Kalle Rovanperä	Jonne Halttunen	Toyota Gazoo Racing WRT	Toyota GR Yaris Rally1	3:00:16.7	0.0	25	5
2	2	33	Elfyn Evans	Scott Martin	Toyota Gazoo Racing WRT	Toyota GR Yaris Rally1	3:01:48.4	+1:31.7	18	4
3	3	6	Dani Sordo	Cándido Carrera	Hyundai Shell Mobis WRT	Hyundai i20 N Rally1	3:01:52.6	+1:35.9	15	2
4	4	8	Ott Tänak	Martin Järveoja	M-Sport Ford WRT	Ford Puma Rally1	3:04:45.1	+4:28.4	12	3
5	5	4	Esapekka Lappi	Janne Ferm	Hyundai Shell Mobis WRT	Hyundai i20 N Rally1	3:06:39.0	+6:22.3	10	1
6	6	18	Takamoto Katsuta	Aaron Johnston	Toyota Gazoo Racing WRT	Toyota GR Yaris Rally1	3:07:37.6	+7:20.9	8	0
10	7	17	Sébastien Ogier	Vincent Landais	Toyota Gazoo Racing WRT	Toyota GR Yaris Rally1	3:12:00.1	+11:43.4	1	0
17	8	9	Jourdan Serderidis	Frédéric Miclotte	M-Sport Ford WRT	Ford Puma Rally1	3:24:07.9	+23:51.2	0	0
20	9	11	Thierry Neuville	Martijn Wydaeghe	Hyundai Shell Mobis WRT	Hyundai i20 N Rally1	3:29:37.9	+29:21.2	0	0
Retired SS2		7	Pierre-Louis Loubet	Nicolas Gilsoul	M-Sport Ford WRT	Ford Puma Rally1	Mechanical		0	0

==== Special stages ====
Stage	Winners	Car	Time	Class leaders
SD	Shakedown cancelled			
SS1	Rovanperä / Halttunen	Toyota GR Yaris Rally1	1:32.9	Rovanperä / Halttunen
SS2	Neuville / Wydaeghe	Hyundai i20 N Rally1	5:34.4	Neuville / Wydaeghe
SS3	Rovanperä / Halttunen	Toyota GR Yaris Rally1	11:16.8	Neuville / Wydaeghe
SS4	Ogier / Landais	Toyota GR Yaris Rally1	5:32.1	Neuville / Wydaeghe
SS5	Tänak / Järveoja	Ford Puma Rally1	12:51.7	Neuville / Wydaeghe
SS6	Tänak / Järveoja	Ford Puma Rally1	18:01.4	Neuville / Wydaeghe
SS7	Rovanperä / Halttunen	Toyota GR Yaris Rally1	19:46.5	Ogier / Landais
SS8	Neuville / Wydaeghe	Hyundai i20 N Rally1	17:00.5	Neuville / Wydaeghe
SS9	Rovanperä / Halttunen	Toyota GR Yaris Rally1	10:47.6	Neuville / Wydaeghe
SS10	Rovanperä / Halttunen	Toyota GR Yaris Rally1	19:07.5	Ogier / Landais
SS11	Rovanperä / Halttunen	Toyota GR Yaris Rally1	16:43.5	Ogier / Landais
SS12	Rovanperä / Halttunen	Toyota GR Yaris Rally1	10:27.4	Rovanperä / Halttunen
SS13	Evans / Martin	Toyota GR Yaris Rally1	16:40.2	Rovanperä / Halttunen
SS14	Sordo / Carrera	Hyundai i20 N Rally1	6:46.4	Rovanperä / Halttunen
SS15	Rovanperä / Halttunen	Toyota GR Yaris Rally1	6:28.1	Rovanperä / Halttunen

==== Championship standings ====
Pos.	Drivers' championships			Co-drivers' championships			Manufacturers' championships		
Pos.	Move	Driver	Points	Move	Co-driver	Points	Move	Manufacturer	Points
1		Kalle Rovanperä	200		Jonne Halttunen	200		Toyota Gazoo Racing WRT	430
2		Elfyn Evans	167		Scott Martin	167		Hyundai Shell Mobis WRT	339
3		Thierry Neuville	134		Martijn Wydaeghe	134		M-Sport Ford WRT	220
4		Ott Tänak	119		Martin Järveoja	119			
5		Sébastien Ogier	99		Vincent Landais	99			

=== WRC-2 Rally2 ===
==== Classification ====
Position		No.	Driver	Co-driver	Entrant	Car	Time	Difference	Points		
Event	Class	No.	Driver	Co-driver	Entrant	Car	Time	Difference	Class	Stage	Event
7	1	20	Andreas Mikkelsen	Torstein Eriksen	Toksport WRT 3	Škoda Fabia RS Rally2	3:09:57.7	0.0	25	1	6
8	2	24	Gus Greensmith	Jonas Andersson	Toksport WRT 3	Škoda Fabia RS Rally2	3:10:08.0	+10.3	18	0	4
9	3	21	Yohan Rossel	Arnaud Dunand	PH Sport	Citroën C3 Rally2	3:11:23.7	+1:26.0	15	0	2
11	4	27	Adrien Fourmaux	Alexandre Coria	M-Sport Ford WRT	Ford Fiesta Rally2	3:12:13.8	+2:16.1	12	2	0
12	5	32	Grégoire Munster	Louis Louka	M-Sport Ford WRT	Ford Fiesta Rally2	3:12:32.4	+2:34.7	10	0	0
13	6	25	Kajetan Kajetanowicz	Maciej Szczepaniak	Kajetan Kajetanowicz	Škoda Fabia RS Rally2	3:12:52.5	+2:54.8	8	0	0
14	7	34	Lauri Joona	Tuukka Shemeikka	Lauri Joona	Škoda Fabia RS Rally2	3:13:05.1	+3:07.4	6	3	0
15	8	29	Martin Prokop	Michal Ernst	Martin Prokop	Ford Fiesta Rally2	3:17:15.6	+7:17.9	4	0	0
16	9	30	Mikołaj Marczyk	Szymon Gospodarczyk	Mikołaj Marczyk	Škoda Fabia RS Rally2	3:23:01.0	+13:03.3	2	0	0
19	10	38	Alejandro Cachón	Alejandro López Fernández	Alejandro Cachón	Citroën C3 Rally2	3:26:34.5	+16:36.8	1	0	0
22	11	48	Chrisostomos Karellis	Elias Panagiotounis	Chrisostomos Karellis	Citroën C3 Rally2	3:31:32.1	+21:34.4	0	0	0
31	12	28	Marco Bulacia	Diego Vallejo	Toksport WRT	Škoda Fabia RS Rally2	3:49:37.8	+39:40.1	0	0	0
33	13	50	Miguel Díaz-Aboitiz	Diego Sanjuan de Eusebio	Miguel Díaz-Aboitiz	Škoda Fabia Rally2 evo	3:56:09.8	+46:12.1	0	0	0
35	14	51	George Vassilakis	Nikos Intzoglou	George Vassilakis	Ford Fiesta Rally2	4:01:05.7	+51:08.0	0	0	0
39	15	47	Vassileios Velanis	Ioannis Velanis	Vassileios Velanis	Škoda Fabia Rally2 evo	4:09:11.9	+59:14.2	0	0	0
42	16	49	Marios Xanthakos	Nikos Karathanassis	Marios Xanthakos	Škoda Fabia R5	4:10:33.0	+1:00:35.3	0	0	0
45	17	44	Gaurav Gill	Florian Barral	Gaurav Gill	Škoda Fabia Rally2 evo	4:13:06.0	+1:03:08.3	0	0	0
Retired SS15		35	Robert Virves	Craig Drew	Robert Virves	Ford Fiesta Rally2	Accident		0	0	0
Retired SS15		39	Alexander Villanueva	José Murado González	Alexander Villanueva	Škoda Fabia RS Rally2	Rolled		0	0	0
Retired SS12		22	Sami Pajari	Enni Mälkönen	Toksport WRT 2	Škoda Fabia RS Rally2	Mechanical		0	0	0
Retired SS10		45	Giorgos Kehagias	Christos Kouzionis	Giorgos Kehagias	Škoda Fabia Rally2 evo	Withdrawn		0	0	0
Retired SS8		37	Lambros Athanassoulas	Nikolaos Zakheos	Lambros Athanassoulas	Hyundai i20 N Rally2	Accident		0	0	0
Retired SS7		46	Panagiotis Roustemis	Nikolaos Petropoulos	Panagiotis Roustemis	Škoda Fabia RS Rally2	Co-driver injury		0	0	0
Retired SS7		36	Alexandros Tsouloftas	Stelios Elia	Alexandros Tsouloftas	Volkswagen Polo GTI R5	Accident		0	0	0
Retired SS5		23	Oliver Solberg	Elliott Edmondson	Oliver Solberg	Škoda Fabia RS Rally2	Fuel system		0	0	0
Retired SS5		67	Yorgo Philippedes	Stuart Loudon	Yorgo Philippedes	Škoda Fabia Rally2 evo	Accident		0	0	0
Retired SS2		31	Georg Linnamäe	James Morgan	Georg Linnamäe	Hyundai i20 N Rally2	Rolled		0	0	0
Did not start		40	Johannes Keferböck	Ilka Minor	Johannes Keferböck	Škoda Fabia Rally2 evo	Withdrawn		0	0	0
Did not start		41	Rakan Al-Rashed	Hugo Magalhães	Rakan Al-Rashed	Škoda Fabia RS Rally2	Medical		0	0	0
Did not start		52	Nasser Khalifa Al-Attiyah	Giovanni Bernacchini	Nasser Khalifa Al-Attiyah	Ford Fiesta Rally2	Withdrawn		0	0	0

==== Special stages ====
Overall
Stage	Winners	Car	Time	Class leaders
SD	Shakedown cancelled			
SS1	Mikkelsen / Eriksen	Škoda Fabia RS Rally2	1:35.0	Mikkelsen / Eriksen
SS2	Pajari / Mälkönen	Škoda Fabia RS Rally2	5:58.4	Fourmaux / Coria
SS3	Fourmaux / Coria	Ford Fiesta Rally2	11:59.0	Fourmaux / Coria
SS4	Stage cancelled			
SS5	Joona / Shemeikka	Škoda Fabia RS Rally2	13:36.7	Fourmaux / Coria
SS6	Mikkelsen / Eriksen	Škoda Fabia RS Rally2	19:06.6	Rossel / Dunand
SS7	Mikkelsen / Eriksen	Škoda Fabia RS Rally2	20:30.8	Rossel / Dunand
SS8	Mikkelsen / Eriksen	Škoda Fabia RS Rally2	17:30.7	Rossel / Dunand
SS9	Mikkelsen / Eriksen	Škoda Fabia RS Rally2	11:30.5	Rossel / Dunand
SS10	Mikkelsen / Eriksen	Škoda Fabia RS Rally2	19:39.4	Greensmith / Andersson
SS11	Mikkelsen / Eriksen	Škoda Fabia RS Rally2	17:25.5	Greensmith / Andersson
SS12	Mikkelsen / Eriksen	Škoda Fabia RS Rally2	11:14.9	Mikkelsen / Eriksen
SS13	Mikkelsen / Eriksen	Škoda Fabia RS Rally2	17:26.9	Mikkelsen / Eriksen
SS14	Mikkelsen / Eriksen	Škoda Fabia RS Rally2	6:54.6	Mikkelsen / Eriksen
SS15	Joona / Shemeikka	Škoda Fabia RS Rally2	6:49.9	Mikkelsen / Eriksen

Challenger
Stage	Winners	Car	Time	Class leaders
SD	Shakedown cancelled			
SS1	Bulacia / Vallejo	Škoda Fabia RS Rally2	1:35.7	Bulacia / Vallejo
SS2	Pajari / Mälkönen	Škoda Fabia RS Rally2	5:58.4	Pajari / Mälkönen
SS3	Kajetanowicz / Szczepaniak	Škoda Fabia RS Rally2	12:09.2	Kajetanowicz / Szczepaniak
SS4	Stage cancelled			
SS5	Joona / Shemeikka	Škoda Fabia RS Rally2	13:36.7	Pajari / Mälkönen
SS6	Bulacia / Vallejo	Škoda Fabia RS Rally2	19:13.6	Bulacia / Vallejo
SS7	Bulacia / Vallejo	Škoda Fabia RS Rally2	20:52.3	Bulacia / Vallejo
SS8	Bulacia / Vallejo	Škoda Fabia RS Rally2	17:47.0	Bulacia / Vallejo
SS9	Pajari / Mälkönen	Škoda Fabia RS Rally2	11:39.0	Pajari / Mälkönen
SS10	Munster / Louka	Ford Fiesta Rally2	20:24.0	Munster / Louka
SS11	Munster / Louka	Ford Fiesta Rally2	17:31.6	Munster / Louka
SS12	Munster / Louka	Ford Fiesta Rally2	11:34.4	Munster / Louka
SS13	Bulacia / Vallejo	Škoda Fabia RS Rally2	18:00.6	Munster / Louka
SS14	Joona / Shemeikka	Škoda Fabia RS Rally2	7:00.8	Munster / Louka
SS15	Joona / Shemeikka	Škoda Fabia RS Rally2	6:49.9	Munster / Louka

==== Championship standings ====
Pos.	Open Drivers' championships			Open Co-drivers' championships			Teams' championships			Challenger Drivers' championships			Challenger Co-drivers' championships		
Pos.	Move	Driver	Points	Move	Co-driver	Points	Move	Manufacturer	Points	Move	Manufacturer	Points	Move	Driver	Points
1		Andreas Mikkelsen	108		Torstein Eriksen	127	2	Toksport WRT 3	148		Sami Pajari	93		Enni Mälkönen	93
2		Yohan Rossel	92		Arnaud Dunand	92	1	M-Sport Ford WRT	146		Kajetan Kajetanowicz	93		Maciej Szczepaniak	93
3	1	Gus Greensmith	80	1	Jonas Andersson	80	1	Toksport WRT 2	115	1	Marco Bulacia	72		Konstantin Aleksandrov	68
4	1	Sami Pajari	71	1	Jonas Andersson	71	2	Toksport WRT	110	1	Nikolay Gryazin	68	1	Szymon Gospodarczyk	65
5	4	Adrien Fourmaux	67	4	Alexandre Coria	67		Hyundai Motorsport N	104		Mikołaj Marczyk	65	1	Diego Vallejo	62

=== WRC-3 Rally3 ===
==== Classification ====
Position		No.	Driver	Co-driver	Entrant	Car	Time	Difference	Points
Event	Class	No.	Driver	Co-driver	Entrant	Car	Time	Difference	Points
18	1	59	Diego Dominguez Jr.	Rogelio Peñate	Diego Dominguez Jr.	Ford Fiesta Rally3	3:24:38.9	0.0	25
21	2	64	Eamonn Kelly	Conor Mohan	Motorsport Ireland Rally Academy	Ford Fiesta Rally3	3:31:31.5	+6:52.6	18
23	3	62	Tom Rensonnet	Loïc Dumont	RACB National Team	Ford Fiesta Rally3	3:32:37.6	+7:58.7	15
24	4	57	Eduardo Castro	Carla Salvat Trías	Eduardo Castro	Ford Fiesta Rally3	3:32:58.5	+8:19.6	12
25	5	63	Roberto Blach Núñez	Mauro Barreiro	Roberto Blach Núñez	Ford Fiesta Rally3	3:38:33.4	+13:54.5	10
26	6	54	Efthimios Halkias	Nikos Komnos	Efthimios Halkias	Renault Clio Rally3	3:41:16.9	+16:38.0	8
32	7	55	Spiros Galerakis	Konstantinos Soukoulis	Spiros Galerakis	Ford Fiesta Rally3	3:53:40.3	+29:01.4	6
34	8	60	William Creighton	Liam Regan	Motorsport Ireland Rally Academy	Ford Fiesta Rally3	3:57:39.9	+33:01.0	4
43	9	56	Giorgos Delaportas	Evangelos Panaritis	Giorgos Delaportas	Ford Fiesta Rally3	4:12:14.2	+47:35.3	2
44	10	61	Laurent Pellier	Kévin Bronner	Laurent Pellier	Ford Fiesta Rally3	4:13:03.0	+48:24.1	1
Retired SS13		53	Epaminondas Karanikolas	Giorgos Kakavas	Epaminondas Karanikolas	Ford Fiesta Rally3	Withdrawn		0
Retired SS11		65	Hamza Anwar	Julia Thulin	Hamza Anwar	Ford Fiesta Rally3	Rolled		0
Retired SS2		58	Ali Türkkan	Burak Erdener	Castrol Ford Team Türkiye	Ford Fiesta Rally3	Withdrawn		0

==== Special stages ====
Stage	Winners	Car	Time	Class leaders
SD	Shakedown cancelled			
SS1	Creighton / Regan	Ford Fiesta Rally3	1:41.7	Creighton / Regan
SS2	Dominguez Jr. / Peñate	Ford Fiesta Rally3	6:26.7	Pellier / Bronner
SS3	Dominguez Jr. / Peñate	Ford Fiesta Rally3	12:49.8	Dominguez Jr. / Peñate
SS4	Stage cancelled			
SS5	Pellier / Bronner	Ford Fiesta Rally3	14:32.7	Dominguez Jr. / Peñate
SS6	Pellier / Bronner	Ford Fiesta Rally3	20:14.5	Dominguez Jr. / Peñate; Pellier / Bronner
SS7	Creighton / Regan	Ford Fiesta Rally3	22:00.0	Dominguez Jr. / Peñate
SS8	Creighton / Regan	Ford Fiesta Rally3	18:52.6	Dominguez Jr. / Peñate
SS9	Stage cancelled			
SS10	Dominguez Jr. / Peñate	Ford Fiesta Rally3	21:15.0	Dominguez Jr. / Peñate
SS11	Creighton / Regan	Ford Fiesta Rally3	18:22.2	Dominguez Jr. / Peñate
SS12	Dominguez Jr. / Peñate	Ford Fiesta Rally3	12:44.7	Dominguez Jr. / Peñate
SS13	Pellier / Bronner	Ford Fiesta Rally3	18:43.6	Dominguez Jr. / Peñate
SS14	Pellier / Bronner	Ford Fiesta Rally3	7:22.0	Dominguez Jr. / Peñate
SS15	Stage cancelled			

==== Championship standings ====
Pos.	Drivers' championships			Co-drivers' championships		
Pos.	Move	Driver	Points	Move	Co-driver	Points
1		Roope Korhonen	100		Anssi Viinikka	100
2		Diego Dominguez Jr.	87		Rogelio Peñate	87
3	2	Tom Rensonnet	55	1	Loïc Dumont	55
4	1	William Creighton	51	1	Liam Regan	51
5	4	Eamonn Kelly	49	2	Conor Mohan	49

=== J-WRC Rally3 ===
==== Classification ====
Position		No.	Driver	Co-driver	Entrant	Car	Time	Difference	Points	
Event	Class	No.	Driver	Co-driver	Entrant	Car	Time	Difference	Class	Stage
18	1	59	Diego Dominguez Jr.	Rogelio Peñate	Diego Dominguez Jr.	Ford Fiesta Rally3	3:24:38.9	0.0	25	4
21	2	64	Eamonn Kelly	Conor Mohan	Motorsport Ireland Rally Academy	Ford Fiesta Rally3	3:31:31.5	+6:52.6	18	0
23	3	62	Tom Rensonnet	Loïc Dumont	RACB National Team	Ford Fiesta Rally3	3:32:37.6	+7:58.7	15	0
25	4	63	Roberto Blach Núñez	Mauro Barreiro	Roberto Blach Núñez	Ford Fiesta Rally3	3:38:33.4	+13:54.5	12	0
34	5	60	William Creighton	Liam Regan	Motorsport Ireland Rally Academy	Ford Fiesta Rally3	3:57:39.9	+33:01.0	10	4
44	6	61	Laurent Pellier	Kévin Bronner	Laurent Pellier	Ford Fiesta Rally3	4:13:03.0	+48:24.1	8	4
Retired SS14		66	Nataniel Bruun Sosa	Claudio Bustos	Nataniel Bruun Sosa	Ford Fiesta Rally3	Rolled		0	0
Retired SS11		65	Hamza Anwar	Julia Thulin	Hamza Anwar	Ford Fiesta Rally3	Rolled		0	0

==== Special stages ====
Stage	Winners	Car	Time	Class leaders
SD	Shakedown cancelled			
SS1	Creighton / Regan	Ford Fiesta Rally3	1:41.7	Creighton / Regan
SS2	Dominguez Jr / Peñate	Ford Fiesta Rally3	6:26.7	Pellier / Bronner
SS3	Dominguez Jr / Peñate	Ford Fiesta Rally3	12:49.8	Dominguez Jr / Peñate
SS4	Stage cancelled			
SS5	Pellier / Bronner	Ford Fiesta Rally3	14:32.7	Dominguez Jr. / Peñate
SS6	Pellier / Bronner	Ford Fiesta Rally3	20:14.5	Dominguez Jr. / Peñate; Pellier / Bronner
SS7	Creighton / Regan	Ford Fiesta Rally3	22:00.0	Dominguez Jr. / Peñate
SS8	Creighton / Regan	Ford Fiesta Rally3	18:52.6	Dominguez Jr. / Peñate
SS9	Stage cancelled			
SS10	Dominguez Jr. / Peñate	Ford Fiesta Rally3	21:15.0	Dominguez Jr. / Peñate
SS11	Creighton / Regan	Ford Fiesta Rally3	18:22.2	Dominguez Jr. / Peñate
SS12	Dominguez Jr. / Peñate	Ford Fiesta Rally3	12:44.7	Dominguez Jr. / Peñate
SS13	Pellier / Bronner	Ford Fiesta Rally3	18:43.6	Dominguez Jr. / Peñate
SS14	Pellier / Bronner	Ford Fiesta Rally3	7:22.0	Dominguez Jr. / Peñate
SS15	Stage cancelled			

==== Championship standings ====
- **Bold text** indicates 2023 World Champions.

Pos.	Drivers' championships			Co-drivers' championships		
Pos.	Move	Driver	Points	Move	Co-driver	Points
1		**William Creighton**	120		**Liam Regan**	120
2	1	Diego Dominguez Jr.	118		Rogelio Peñate	118
3	1	Laurent Pellier	87		Mauro Barreiro	77
4		Roberto Blach	77	1	Loïc Dumont	74
5	1	Tom Rensonnet	74	2	Conor Mohan	69

== Notes ==
Previous rally: 2023 Rally Finland	2023 FIA World Rally Championship	Next rally: 2023 Rally Chile
Previous rally: 2022 Acropolis Rally	2023 Acropolis Rally	Next rally: 2024 Acropolis Rally
