= Roope Korhonen =

Finnish rally driver

Personal information
- Nationality: (Finland) Finnish
- Full name: Roope Kalevi Antero Korhonen
- Born: 18 September 1998 (age 28)

World Rally Championship record
- Years active: 2022–present
- Co-driver: (Finland) Anssi Viinikka
- Rallies: 20
- Championships: 0
- Rally wins: 0
- Podiums: 0
- Stage wins: 0
- Total points: 9
- First rally: 2022 Rally Estonia

Roope Korhonen (born 18 September 1998) is a Finnish rally driver. He is the 2023 World Rally Championship-3 champion.

== Career ==
Korhonen made his World Rally Championship debut in the 2022 Rally Estonia.

In 2023, Korhonen contested a full World Rally Championship-3 campaign, winning four rallies and securing the championship victory with several rounds remaining. Korhonen also made his debut in the World Rally Championship-2 class, competing in Rally2 cars at the Rally Finland and Central European Rally.

== Results ==
=== WRC results ===
Year	Entrant	Car	1	2	3	4	5	6	7	8	9	10	11	12	13	14	Pos.	Points
2022	Roope Korhonen	Ford Fiesta Rally3	MON	SWE	CRO	POR	ITA	KEN	EST; 33	FIN	BEL	GRE	NZL	ESP	JPN		NC	0
2023	Rautio Motorsport	Ford Fiesta Rally3	MON	SWE; 22	MEX	CRO	POR; 21	ITA; 18	KEN	EST; 17							NC	0
2023	Rautio Motorsport	Volkswagen Polo GTI R5									FIN; 42	GRE	CHL				NC	0
2023	Roope Korhonen	Škoda Fabia Rally2 evo												EUR; Ret	JPN		NC	0
2024	Roope Korhonen	Toyota GR Yaris Rally2	MON	SWE; 8	KEN	CRO	POR; 13	ITA; WD	POL; 16	LAT	FIN; 11	GRE	CHI	EUR	JPN		25th	3
2025	Roope Korhonen	Toyota GR Yaris Rally2	MON	SWE; 10	KEN	ESP	POR; 13	ITA; 36	GRE	EST; 13	FIN; 11	PAR	CHL	EUR	JPN	SAU; 24	23rd	1
2026	Rautio Motorsport	Toyota GR Yaris Rally2	MON	SWE; 10	KEN	CRO; 8	ESP	POR; 12	JPN	GRE	EST	FIN	PAR	CHL	ITA	SAU	21st*	5*

* Season still in progress.

=== WRC2 results ===
Year	Entrant	Car	1	2	3	4	5	6	7	8	9	10	11	12	13	14	Pos.	Points
2023	Rautio Motorsport	Volkswagen Polo GTI R5	MON	SWE	MEX	CRO	POR	ITA	KEN	EST	FIN; 19	GRE	CHL				NC	0
2023	Roope Korhonen	Škoda Fabia Rally2 evo												EUR; Ret	JPN		NC	0
2024	Roope Korhonen	Toyota GR Yaris Rally2	MON	SWE; 4	KEN	CRO	POR; 6	ITA; WD	POL; 8	LAT	FIN; 6	GRE	CHI	EUR	JPN		16th	32
2025	Roope Korhonen	Toyota GR Yaris Rally2	MON	SWE; 2	KEN	ESP	POR; 4	ITA; 18	GRE	EST; 3	FIN; 1	PAR	CHL	EUR	JPN	SAU; 9	6th	71
2026	Rautio Motorsport	Toyota GR Yaris Rally2	MON	SWE; 1	KEN	CRO; 5	ESP	POR; 2	JPN	GRE	EST	FIN	PAR	CHL	ITA	SAU	3rd*	52*

* Season still in progress.

=== WRC3 results ===
Year	Entrant	Car	1	2	3	4	5	6	7	8	9	10	11	12	13	Pos.	Points
2022	Roope Korhonen	Ford Fiesta Rally3	MON	SWE	CRO	POR	ITA	KEN	EST; 5	FIN	BEL	GRE	NZL	ESP	JPN	16th	10
2023	Rautio Motorsport	Ford Fiesta Rally3	MON	SWE; 1	MEX	CRO	POR; 1	ITA; 1	KEN	EST; 1	FIN	GRE	CHL	EUR	JPN	1st	100

=== ERC results ===
Year	Entrant	Car	1	2	3	4	5	6	7	8	Pos.	Points
2025	Team MRF Tyres	Toyota GR Yaris Rally2	ESP	HUN; 1	SWE; 2	POL; Ret	ITA; Ret	CZE	GBR	CRO	5th	60
