= 2023 Junior WRC Championship =

WOC radio

The 2023 FIA Junior WRC Championship was the tenth season of Junior WRC, a rallying championship governed by the Fédération Internationale de l'Automobile, running in support of the World Rally Championship. The championship featured five events, beginning in February at the Rally Sweden and concluded in September at the Acropolis Rally.

Robert Virves and Brian Hoy were the reigning drivers' and co-drivers' champions. (Note: The FIA's junior category titles were awarded as part of the 2022 WRC3 Championship.) William Creighton and Liam Regan became the 2023 Junior WRC Champions.

== Calendar ==
A map showing the locations of the rallies in the 2023 Junior WRC Championship. Click on the dot to see the rally details.

Round	Start date	Finish date	Rally	Rally headquarters	Surface	Stages	Distance	Ref.
1	9 February	12 February	Rally Sweden	Umeå, Västerbotten County, Sweden	Snow	18	325.02 km	
2	20 April	23 April	Croatia Rally	Zagreb, Croatia	Tarmac	20	301.26 km	
3	1 June	4 June	(Italy) Rally Italia Sardegna	Olbia, Sardinia, Italy	Gravel	19	334.05 km	
4	20 July	23 July	Rally Estonia	Tartu, Tartu County, Estonia	Gravel	21	300.70 km	
5	7 September	10 September	Acropolis Rally Greece	Lamia, Central Greece, Greece	Gravel	15	270.89 km	

== Entries ==
The following crews entered into the Junior WRC Championship:

Car	Driver name	Co-driver name	Rounds
Ford Fiesta Rally3	(Kenya) Hamza Anwar	(Kenya) Adnan Din	1, 3
Ford Fiesta Rally3	(Kenya) Hamza Anwar	(Republic of Ireland) Martin Brady	2
Ford Fiesta Rally3	(Kenya) Hamza Anwar	(United States) Alexander Kihurani	4
Ford Fiesta Rally3	(Kenya) Hamza Anwar	(Sweden) Julia Thulin	5
Ford Fiesta Rally3	(Spain) Roberto Blach	(Spain) Mauro Barreiro	All
Ford Fiesta Rally3	(Bolivia) Nataniel Bruun Sosa	(Argentina) Claudio Bustos	5
Ford Fiesta Rally3	(Republic of Ireland) William Creighton	(Republic of Ireland) Liam Regan	All
Ford Fiesta Rally3	(Paraguay) Diego Domínguez Jr.	(Spain) Rogelio Peñate	All
Ford Fiesta Rally3	(Spain) Raúl Hernández	(Spain) Rodrigo Sanjuan	1–2
Ford Fiesta Rally3	(Spain) Raúl Hernández	(Spain) Adrián Pérez Fernández	3
Ford Fiesta Rally3	(Republic of Ireland) Eamonn Kelly	(Republic of Ireland) Conor Mohan	All
Ford Fiesta Rally3	(Luxembourg) Grégoire Munster	(Belgium) Louis Louka	1, 4
Ford Fiesta Rally3	(France) Laurent Pellier	(France) Marine Pelamourgues	1–2
Ford Fiesta Rally3	(France) Laurent Pellier	(France) Kévin Bronner	3–5
Ford Fiesta Rally3	(Belgium) Tom Rensonnet	(Belgium) Loïc Dumont	All

== Sporting Regulations ==
The Junior WRC was open for drivers born on or after 1 January 1994 and had not competed as a priority 1 (P1) driver designated to score Manufacturer points before the first JWRC round, no such restrictions were set for co-drivers. All crews once again contested identical Ford Fiesta Rally3 cars prepared by the M-Sport Poland for the winning prize of four fully-funded Ford Fiesta Rally2 drives with a tyre package and a pre-event test.

== Results and standings ==
=== Season summary ===
Round	Event	Winning driver	Winning co-driver	Winning time	Report	Ref.
1	Rally Sweden	(Republic of Ireland) William Creighton	(Republic of Ireland) Liam Regan	2:45:05.5	Report	
2	Croatia Rally	(Republic of Ireland) Eamonn Kelly	(Republic of Ireland) Conor Mohan	3:20:15.7	Report	
3	(Italy) Rally Italia Sardegna	(Republic of Ireland) William Creighton	(Republic of Ireland) Liam Regan	4:15:11.5	Report	
4	Rally Estonia	(Luxembourg) Grégoire Munster	(Belgium) Louis Louka	2:57:42.6	Report	
5	Acropolis Rally Greece	(Paraguay) Diego Domínguez Jr.	(Spain) Rogelio Peñate	3:24:38.9	Report	

=== Scoring system ===
Points were awarded to the top ten classified finishers. An additional point was given for every stage win. The best four results out of five counted towards the final drivers’ and co-drivers’ standings. However, all points gained from stage wins were retained. Double points were awarded at the season's finale to those with at least 3 previous 2023 JWRC round starts.

Position	1st	2nd	3rd	4th	5th	6th	7th	8th	9th	10th
Points	25	18	15	12	10	8	6	4	2	1

=== FIA Junior WRC Championship for Drivers ===
Pos.	Driver	SWE (Sweden)	CRO (Croatia)	ITA (Italy)	EST (Estonia)	GRC (Greece)	Total Points	Best 4
1	(Republic of Ireland) William Creighton	1^{9}	7^{10}	1^{4}	7^{11}	5^{4}	120	114
2	(Paraguay) Diego Domínguez Jr.	3	4	2^{2}	3^{2}	1^{4}	118	106
3	(France) Laurent Pellier	2^{6}	Ret^{5}	4^{5}	2^{3}	6^{4}	87	87
4	(Republic of Ireland) Eamonn Kelly	Ret	1	6	Ret	2	69	69
5	(Spain) Roberto Blach	6	3^{3}	3	4	4	77	69
6	(Belgium) Tom Rensonnet	7	2^{2}	5	6	3	74	68
7	(Luxembourg) Grégoire Munster	4^{3}			1^{5}		45	45
8	(Spain) Raúl Hernández	5	6	7^{5}			29	29
9	(Kenya) Hamza Anwar	8	5	8	5	Ret	28	28
10	(Bolivia) Nataniel Bruun Sosa					Ret	0	0
Pos.	Driver	SWE (Sweden)	CRO (Croatia)	ITA (Italy)	EST (Estonia)	GRC (Greece)	Total Points	Best 4

Key
Colour	Result
Gold	Winner
Silver	2nd place
Bronze	3rd place
Green	Points finish
Blue	Non-points finish
Blue	Non-classified finish (NC)
Purple	Did not finish (Ret)
Black	Excluded (EX)
Black	Disqualified (DSQ)
White	Did not start (DNS)
White	Cancelled (C)
Blank	Withdrew entry from the event (WD)

Notes:
Superscripts indicate the number of bonus points that drivers received for winning stages during each rally.

=== FIA Junior WRC Championship for Co-Drivers ===
Pos.	Co-Driver	SWE (Sweden)	CRO (Croatia)	ITA (Italy)	EST (Estonia)	GRC (Greece)	Total Points	Best 4
1	(Republic of Ireland) Liam Regan	1^{9}	7^{10}	1^{4}	7^{11}	5^{4}	120	114
2	(Spain) Rogelio Peñate	3	4	2^{2}	3^{2}	1^{4}	118	106
3	(Republic of Ireland) Conor Mohan	Ret	1	6	Ret	2	69	69
4	(Spain) Mauro Barreiro	6	3^{3}	3	4	4	77	69
5	(Belgium) Loïc Dumont	7	2^{2}	5	6	3	74	68
6	(France) Kévin Bronner			4^{5}	2^{3}	6^{4}	58	58
7	(Belgium) Louis Louka	4^{3}			1^{5}		45	45
8	(France) Marine Pelamourgues	2^{6}	Ret^{5}				29	29
9	(Spain) Rodrigo Sanjuan	5	6				18	18
10	(Spain) Adrián Pérez Fernández			7^{5}			11	11
11	(Republic of Ireland) Martin Brady		5				10	10
12	(United States) Alexander Kihurani				5		10	10
13	(Kenya) Adnan Din	8		8			8	8
14	(Sweden) Julia Thulin					Ret	0	0
15	(Argentina) Claudio Bustos					Ret	0	0
Pos.	Co-Driver	SWE (Sweden)	CRO (Croatia)	ITA (Italy)	EST (Estonia)	GRC (Greece)	Total Points	Best 4

Key
Colour	Result
Gold	Winner
Silver	2nd place
Bronze	3rd place
Green	Points finish
Blue	Non-points finish
Blue	Non-classified finish (NC)
Purple	Did not finish (Ret)
Black	Excluded (EX)
Black	Disqualified (DSQ)
White	Did not start (DNS)
White	Cancelled (C)
Blank	Withdrew entry from the event (WD)

Notes:
Superscripts indicate the number of bonus points that drivers received for winning stages during each rally.
