= William Creighton (rally driver) =

Irish rally driver (born 1997)

Personal information
- Nationality: (Republic of Ireland) Irish
- Born: 20 November 1997 (age 28); Moira

World Rally Championship record
- Years active: 2018–present
- Co-driver: (Republic of Ireland) Liam Regan
- Championships: Junior World Rally Championship

William Creighton (born 20 November 1997, in Moira, Ireland) is an Irish rally driver. He won the 2023 Junior World Rally Championship. Creighton has previously driven under a British license and has won the Junior British Rally Championship in 2021.

== Career ==
=== 2023 ===
In the 2023 season, Creighton competed in the WRC3 and JWRC with Liam Regan as co-driver. He won the JWRC drivers' championship after leading the series for much of the season. At the season finale of Acropolis Rally, where double points were available, he retired and re-entered with Super-rally. Finishing 5th and together with points for special stage victories was enough to win the Junior Championship.
