= Grégoire Munster =

Luxembourgish rally driver (born 1998)

- Grégoire Munster at East Belgian Rally

Personal information
- Nationality: (Belgium) Belgian (Luxembourg) Luxembourgish
- Born: 24 December 1998 (age 27)

World Rally Championship record
- Years active: 2019–present
- Co-driver: (Belgium) Louis Louka
- Teams: M-Sport Ford WRT
- Rallies: 52
- Championships: 0
- Rally wins: 0
- Podiums: 0
- Stage wins: 2
- Total points: 98
- First rally: 2019 Monte Carlo Rally
- Last rally: 2026 Monte Carlo Rally

Grégoire Munster (born 24 December 1998) is a professional rally driver. Munster holds dual-citizenship through his Belgian father and Luxembourgish mother, but he drives with a licence from Luxembourg because he receives some financial support from the Automobile Federation of Luxembourg. He lives in Belgium. He is the son of former Belgian rally icon Bernard Munster.

== Career ==
=== Early career ===
Munster started his rallying career as a co-driver for his father Bernard, with whom he debuted at the Terre de Lozère Rally in 2015. The following year, the Munster duo won the Rally Nationale Terre de Vaucluse, with Grégoire co-driving a Porsche 911 Carrera RS Proto. In 2017, Munster entered his first championship as a driver, finishing sixth in the ADAC Opel Rallye Cup. His 2018 season proved fruitful, as Munster progressed to win three rallies in the Opel Cup and ended up second in the standings. He also contested the Belgian Junior Championship, winning it with four rally triumphs at the wheel of an Opel Adam R2.

Having made his European Rally Championship debut in 2018, Munster entered the ERC with the ADAC Opel Rallye Junior Team in 2019, driving in the ERC-3 Junior category. He scored a best finish of fourth in Spain and finished seventh in the junior class standings. Munster also retained the Belgian Junior title by winning four of the opening five rounds, as well as finishing second again in the ADAC Opel Rallye Cup with three wins from four outings. During 2019, Munster also made his WRC debut, contesting the Monte Carlo Rally with a Škoda Fabia R5. He later also drove at the Rally Finland together with Louis Louka.

=== Years at Hyundai ===
For the 2020 season, Munster joined Hyundai and its junior programme to pilot the i20 R5 in the ERC on a full-time basis. He showed progress to his debut year, as Munster followed two top ten results up with his first podium, as well as first ERC stage win, in Portugal. Another strong result with second at Hungary followed, though Munster lost out on the ERC1 junior title after suffering an early puncture at the Rally Islas Canarias, leaving him third in the overall standings. During 2020, Munster again made several WRC starts in WRC2 machinery. He remained with Hyundai in 2021 and focused on the Belgian Rally Championship, where two victories helped him and Louka to place second overall. In addition, Munster raced in two events of the WRC3 Championship, notably winning seven stages (including the Power Stage) at the Ypres Rally.

Munster joined the Customer Racing Junior Driver programme of Hyundai Motorsport in 2022. As part of the programme, he and Louka competed in several WRC2 events, starting off with fifth in class at Monte Carlo. Five more rounds followed, as Munster took a maiden WRC2 victory in Japan on his way to ninth in the championship. He was later voted as the most improved driver of the WRC in 2022 by fans.

=== WRC top class ===
==== 2023 ====
In 2023, Munster left Hyundai to join M-Sport Ford ahead of another season focused on the WRC2. However, after co-driving with Jourdan Serderidis at the Malcolm Wilson Rally, Munster received the opportunity to make his Rally1 debut at the Rally Chile in the car owned by Serderidis. He then impressed by completing a secure drive in mixed conditions at the Central European Rally later in the month. Munster concluded the year by retiring late in the WRC2 class in Japan after competing for the win on dirty asphalt, leaving him 17th in the class standings.

==== 2024 ====
With Ott Tänak's departure from Ford, M-Sport promoted Munster to contest the 2024 WRC season in what was titled a learning year. Down on mileage compared to his more experienced WRC competitors, Serderidis-backed Munster struggled heavily, making defining errors in Monte Carlo, Portugal, and Finland among others. His performances improved towards the rest of the year, peaking with two successive fifth-place finishes in Central Europe and Japan.

==== 2025 ====
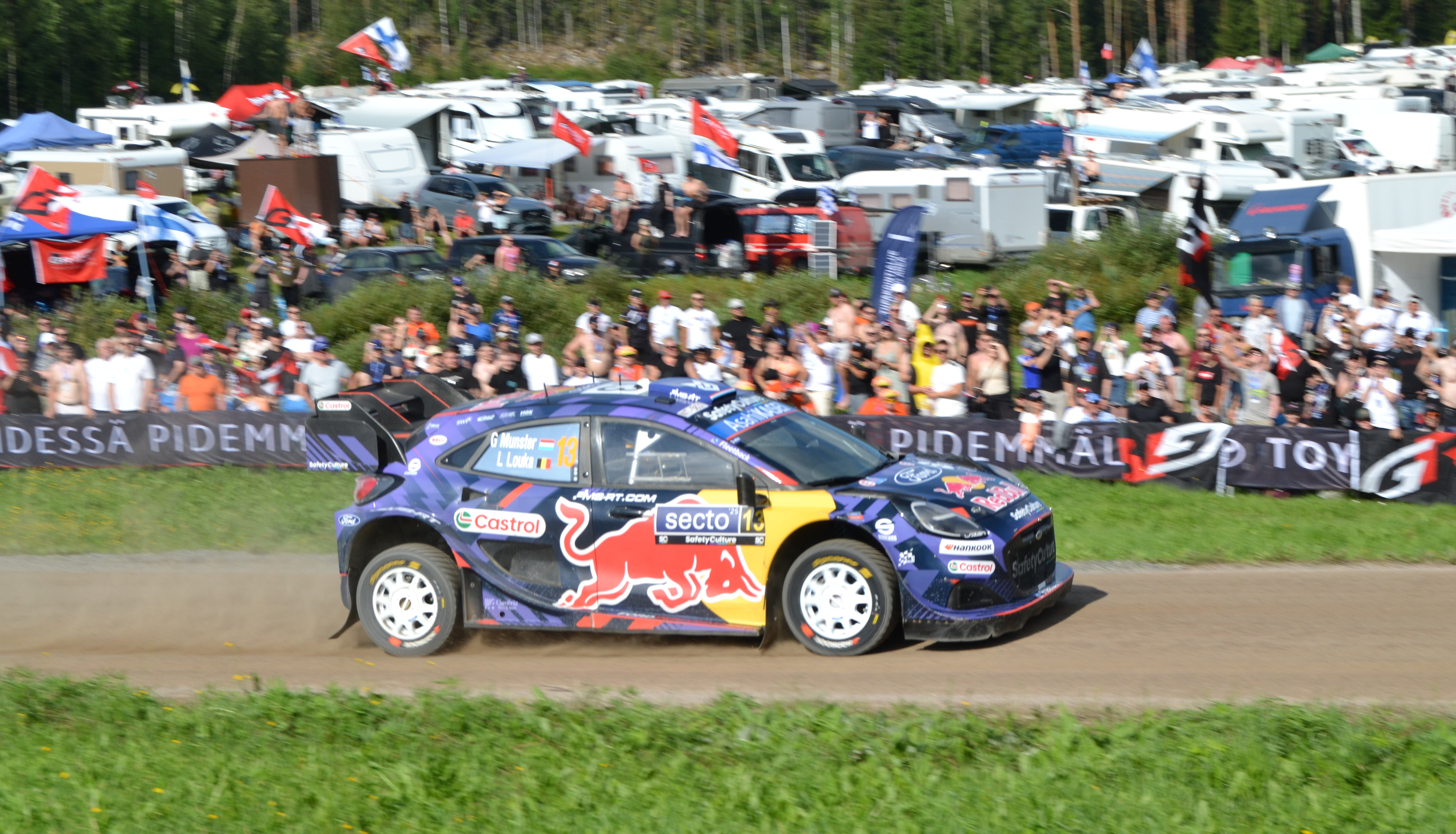
Munster at the 2025 Rally Finland.

Consequently, Munster and Louka were retained by M-Sport for 2025, this time being installed as team leaders as a consequence of Adrien Fourmaux leaving the team. Despite encountering a puncture on Friday and crashing out on black ice late at Monte Carlo, Munster impressed with his pace, as proven by his maiden stage win in SS10. Eighth at Sweden was followed by fifth in Kenya, where Munster overcame suspension damage and the death of his grandfather earlier in the week to win stage 15. An off at the Rally Islas Canarias caused a non-score, meanwhile a tricky run in Portugal earned him ninth. A disaster for M-Sport followed during stage 2 of the Sardinia event as all three cars incurred stage-ending damage; Munster broke his front-right suspension and went on to finish 32nd overall. Munster then ran sixth in Greece before being forced to retire on Sunday with a mechanical failure. He finished tenth in Estonia due to a puncture and a few mistakes, while similar circumstances left him ninth in Finland. At the start of the Paraguay Rally, Munster hit something that wasn't on the pace notes, which caused him to drop out of contention immediately. Issues with the starter motor on Saturday further cost Munster, as he finished 39th overall. A more consistent event in Chile earned Munster eighth place, his best result since March. Munster's final non-score came in Central Europe, where he retired from Friday's running after damaging his rear suspension. He bounced back by finishing fifth in Japan, before concluding the year with an eighth place in Saudi Arabia. Munster finished tenth in the championship, highest of the Ford drivers.

==== 2026 ====
Munster was replaced by Jon Armstrong for the 2026 season, but was given the chance to conclude his Rally1 tenure with a start at the Monte Carlo Rally.

== Rally results ==
=== ADAC Opel Rallye Cup results ===
Year	Entrant	Car	1	2	3	4	5	6	7	8	Pos.	Points
2017	Grégoire Munster	Opel Adam R2	VOG; 11	SUL; 5	SAC; 12	STE; 10	DEU1; 7	DEU2; 5	NIE; 4	3SR; 4	6th	122
2018	Grégoire Munster	Opel Adam R2	SAA; 3	SAC; 2	STE; 3	WAR; 1	DEU1; 1	DEU2; Ret	ERZ; 6	3SR; 1	2nd	233
2019	Grégoire Munster	Opel Adam R2	SAA; 14	SAC; C	STE; 1	SUL; 1	ERZ; Ret	3SR; 1			2nd	150

=== Belgian Rally Championship results ===
Year	Entrant	Car	1	2	3	4	5	6	7	8	9	10	Pos.	Points
2018	Hainaut Motor Club	Opel Adam R2	HAS; Ret	SPA; 7	TAC; Ret	WAL; 14	SEZ; 11	YPR; 18	OVV; 17	EBR	CON; Ret		7th	48
2019	East Belgian Racing Team	Škoda Fabia R5	HAS; 14	SPA; 7	TAC; Ret	WAL; 18	SEZ; 11	YPR	OVV	EBR; 6	CON; 11		8th	48
2020	Grégoire Munster	Hyundai i20 R5	HAS; 4	OUD; Ret									10th	38
2021	Grégoire Munster	Hyundai i20 N	SBR; Ret	YPR; 7	OVV; 4	EBR; 1	WAL; 2	SEZ; 1	CON; 3	SPA; 2			2nd	125
2022	East Belgian Racing Team	Hyundai i20 N	HAS	SBR; 2	TAC	WAL	SEZ; 2	YPR; 11	OVV	EBR	CON	SPA; 2	NC	0

=== ERC results ===
Year	Entrant	Car	Class	1	2	3	4	5	6	7	8	Pos.	Points
2018	EBRT	Opel Adam R2	ERC-3	AZO	CAN	GRC	CYP	ITA	CZE; 8	POL	LAT	23rd	7
2019	ADAC Opel Rallye Junior Team	Opel Adam R2	ERC-3	AZO; 11	CAN; 6	LAT; Ret	POL; Ret	ITA; 7	CZE; Ret	CYP	HUN	16th	20
2020	Hyundai Motorsport N	Hyundai i20 R5	ERC	ITA; 7	LAT; 6	PRT; 3	HUN; 2	CAN; 18				3rd	83
2021	Hyundai Motorsport N	Hyundai i20 R5	ERC	POL; 20	LAT; 17	ITA; 13	CZE	AZO	PRT	HUN	CAN	55th	3

=== WRC results ===
Year	Entrant	Car	1	2	3	4	5	6	7	8	9	10	11	12	13	14	Pos.	Points
2019	Grégoire Munster	Škoda Fabia R5	MON; Ret	SWE	MEX	FRA	ARG	CHL	POR	ITA	FIN; 45	GER	TUR	GBR	ESP	AUS; C	NC	0
2020	Grégoire Munster	Škoda Fabia R5	MON; 14														NC	0
2020	Grégoire Munster	Hyundai i20 R5		SWE; WD	MEX	EST; 24	TUR	ITA	MNZ; Ret								NC	0
2021	Grégoire Munster	Hyundai i20 R5	MON	ARC	CRO	POR	ITA	KEN	EST	BEL; 16	GRE	FIN	ESP				NC	0
2021	Grégoire Munster	Hyundai i20 N Rally2												MNZ; 15			NC	0
2022	Grégoire Munster	Hyundai i20 N Rally2	MON; 12	SWE	CRO; 48	POR	ITA	KEN	EST	FIN	BEL; 11	GRE; Ret	NZL	ESP; 22	JPN; 7		23rd	6
2023	M-Sport Ford WRT	Ford Fiesta Rally2	MON; 17			CRO; 26	POR; 42	ITA; 11	KEN; Ret		FIN; 15	GRE; 12			JPN; Ret		21st	6
2023	M-Sport Ford WRT	Ford Puma Rally1											CHL; 13	EUR; 7			21st	6
2023	Grégoire Munster	Ford Fiesta Rally3		SWE; 26	MEX					EST; 18							21st	6
2024	M-Sport Ford WRT	Ford Puma Rally1	MON; 20	SWE; 23	KEN; 15	CRO; 7	POR; Ret	ITA; 5	POL; 7	LAT; 9	FIN; 49	GRE; Ret	CHL; 7	EUR; 5	JPN; 5		8th	46
2025	M-Sport Ford WRT	Ford Puma Rally1	MON; Ret	SWE; 8	KEN; 5	ESP; 11	POR; 9	ITA; 32	GRE; Ret	EST; 10	FIN; 9	PAR; 39	CHL; 8	EUR; 27	JPN; 5	SAU; 8	10th	40
2026	M-Sport Ford WRT	Ford Puma Rally1	MON; Ret	SWE	KEN	CRO	ESP	POR	JPN	GRE	EST	FIN	PAR	CHL	ITA	SAU	NC	0

=== WRC2 results ===
Year	Entrant	Car	1	2	3	4	5	6	7	8	9	10	11	12	13	14	Pos.	Points
2019	BMA Autosport	Škoda Fabia R5	MON; Ret	SWE	MEX	FRA	ARG	CHL	POR	ITA	FIN; 8	GER	TUR	GBR	ESP	AUS; C	43rd	4
2022	Grégoire Munster	Hyundai i20 N Rally2	MON; 5	SWE	CRO; 25	POR	ITA	KEN	EST	FIN	BEL; 5	GRE; Ret	NZL	ESP; 12	JPN; 1		9th	48
2023	M-Sport Ford WRT	Ford Fiesta Rally2	MON; 8	SWE	MEX	CRO; 11	POR; 27	ITA; 7	KEN; Ret	EST	FIN; 9	GRE; 5	CHL	EUR	JPN; Ret		17th	22
