= Louis Louka =

Belgian rally co-driver (born 1993)

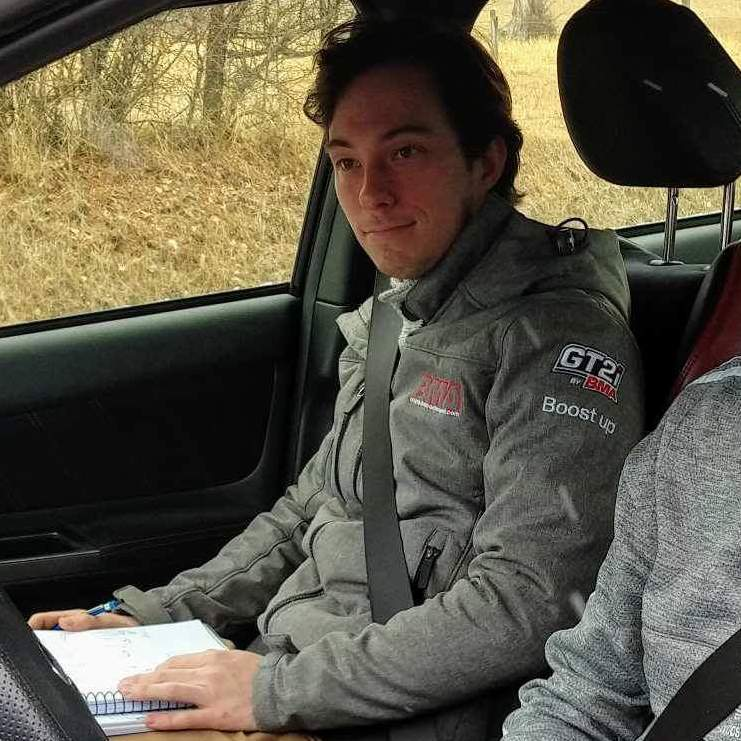
- Louka at the 2019 Monte Carlo Rally

Personal information
- Nationality: (Belgium) Belgian
- Born: 10 December 1993 (age 32); Charleroi, Belgium

World Rally Championship record
- Years active: 2019–present
- Driver: (Luxembourg) Grégoire Munster
- Teams: M-Sport Ford WRT
- Rallies: 53
- Championships: 0
- Rally wins: 0
- Podiums: 0
- Stage wins: 2
- Total points: 98
- First rally: 2019 Monte Carlo Rally
- Last rally: 2026 Monte Carlo Rally

Louis Louka (born 10 December 1993) is a Belgian rallying co-driver. His father, Thom Louka, is also a rally driver, driving an Alpine A110 in historic rallies. Louka began his career by washing car windscreens and slowly began to gain a passion for rallying.

== Career ==
Louka started working with Gregoire Munster in mid-2018. He then made his World Rally Championship debut in 2019, as Munster's co-driver during the 2019 Monte Carlo Rally. They were announced to continue their respective careers in the WRC for M-Sport as the team's lead crew in 2025, alongside Irish crew, Josh McErlean and his co-driver, Eoin Treacy.

== Rally results ==
=== Belgian Rally Championship results ===
Year	Entrant	Car	1	2	3	4	5	6	7	8	9	Pos.	Points
2015	Guillaume Dilley	Citroën DS3 R3T Max	HAS; 11	SPA; 7	TAC; 10	WAL; 10	SEZ; 6	YPR; 11	OVV; 5	EBR; 7	CON; 7	2nd	97
2016	Ecurie Le Perron	Opel Adam R2	HAS	SPA; Ret	TAC	WAL; 31	SEZ	YPR	OVV	EBR; Ret		NC	0
2016	Peugeot Belgium Luxembourg	Peugeot 208 R2									CON; 15	NC	0
2017	Peugeot Belgium Luxembourg	Peugeot 208 R2	HAS; 11	SPA; Ret	TAC; Ret	WAL; 16	SEZ; 5	YPR; 14	OVV	EBR		5th	45
2017	Peugeot Belgium Luxembourg	Peugeot 208 T16									CON; Ret	5th	45
2018	Peugeot Belgium Luxembourg	Peugeot 208 T16	HAS; 3	SPA; Ret	TAC	WAL; Ret	SEZ					?	28
2018	Grégoire Munster	Opel Adam R2						YPR; 18	OVV; 17	EBR	CON; Ret	?	28
2019	East Belgian Racing Team	Škoda Fabia R5	HAS; 14	SPA; 7	TAC; Ret	WAL; 18	SEZ; 11	YPR	OVV	EBR; 6	CON; 11	6th	48

=== WRC results ===
Year	Entrant	Car	1	2	3	4	5	6	7	8	9	10	11	12	13	14	Pos.	Points
2019	Grégoire Munster	Škoda Fabia R5	MON; Ret	SWE	MEX	FRA	ARG	CHL	POR	ITA	FIN; 45	GER	TUR	GBR	ESP	AUS; C	NC	0
2020	Grégoire Munster	Škoda Fabia R5	MON; 14														NC	0
2020	Grégoire Munster	Hyundai i20 R5		SWE; WD	MEX	EST; 24	TUR	ITA	MNZ; Ret								NC	0
2021	Grégoire Munster	Hyundai i20 R5	MON	ARC	CRO	POR	ITA	KEN	EST	BEL; 16	GRE	FIN	ESP				NC	0
2021	Grégoire Munster	Hyundai i20 N Rally2												MNZ; 15			NC	0
2022	Grégoire Munster	Hyundai i20 N Rally2	MON; 12	SWE	CRO; 48	POR	ITA	KEN	EST	FIN	BEL; 11	GRE; Ret	NZL	ESP; 22	JPN; 7		23rd	6
2023	M-Sport Ford WRT	Ford Fiesta Rally2	MON; 17			CRO; 26	POR; 42	ITA; 11	KEN; Ret		FIN; 15	GRE; 12			JPN; Ret		22nd	6
2023	M-Sport Ford WRT	Ford Puma Rally1											CHL; 13	EUR; 7			22nd	6
2023	Grégoire Munster	Ford Fiesta Rally3		SWE; 26	MEX					EST; 18							22nd	6
2024	M-Sport Ford WRT	Ford Puma Rally1	MON; 20	SWE; 23	KEN; 15	CRO; 7	POR; Ret	ITA; 5	POL; 7	LAT; 9	FIN; 49	GRE; Ret	CHL; 7	EUR; 5	JPN; 5		8th	46
2025	M-Sport Ford WRT	Ford Puma Rally1	MON; Ret	SWE; 8	KEN; 5	ESP; 11	POR; 9	ITA; 32	GRE; Ret	EST; 10	FIN; 9	PAR; 39	CHL; 8	EUR; 27	JPN; 5	SAU; 8	10th	40
2026	M-Sport Ford WRT	Ford Puma Rally1	MON; Ret	SWE	KEN	CRO	ESP	POR	JPN	GRE	EST	FIN	PAR	CHL	ITA	SAU	NC	0
