= 2023 Rally Japan =

8th edition of Rally Japan

2023 Rally Japan FORUM8 Rally Japan 2023
Round 13 of 13 in the 2023 World Rally Championship
← Previous event
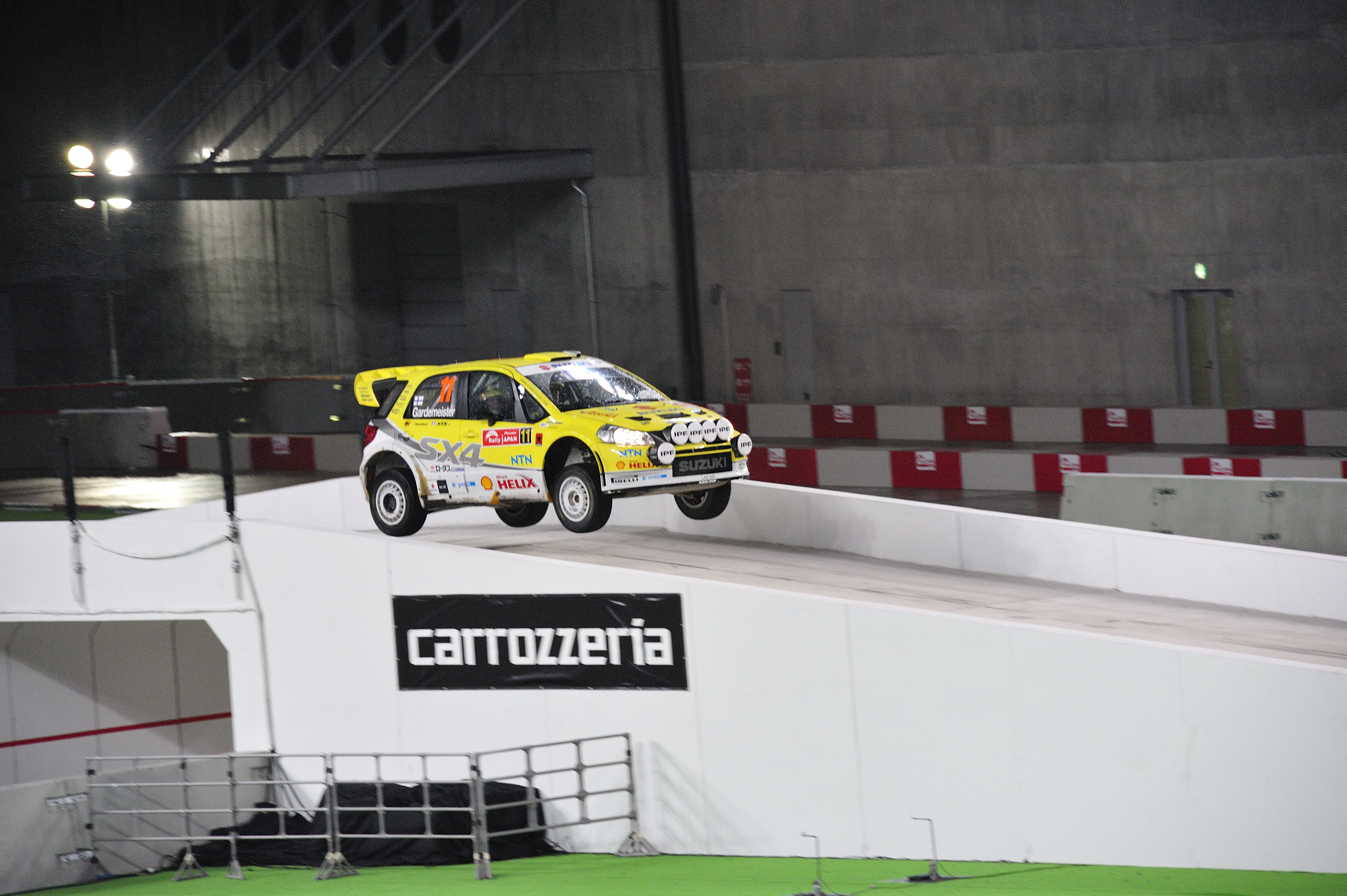
- The event would be featured with route through Toyota Stadium.
- Host country: Japan
- Rally base: Toyota, Aichi Prefecture
- Dates run: 16 – 19 November 2023
- Start location: Toyota Stadium, Toyota
- Finish location: Toyota Stadium, Toyota
- Stages: 22 (304.66 km; 189.31 miles)
- Stage surface: Tarmac
- Transport distance: 665.09 km (413.27 miles)
- Overall distance: 969.75 km (602.57 miles)

Statistics
- Crews registered: 36
- Crews: 34 at start, 28 at finish
- Cancellation: SS4 cancelled due to safety concern.

Overall results
- Overall winner: (United Kingdom) Elfyn Evans (United Kingdom) Scott Martin (Japan) Toyota Gazoo Racing WRT; 3:32:08.8
- Power Stage winner: (Belgium) Thierry Neuville (Belgium) Martijn Wydaeghe (South Korea) Hyundai Shell Mobis WRT; 4:48.8

Support category results
- WRC-2 winner: (Norway) Andreas Mikkelsen (Norway) Torstein Eriksen (Germany) Toksport WRT 3; 3:39:42.5
- WRC-3 winner: (Canada) Jason Bailey (Canada) Shayne Peterson; 5:03:05.7

The 2023 Rally Japan (also known as the FORUM8 Rally Japan 2023) was a motor racing event for rally cars held from 16 to 19 November 2023. It marked the eighth running of the Rally Japan, and was the final round of the 2023 World Rally Championship, World Rally Championship-2 and World Rally Championship-3. The event was based in Nagoya in Chūbu Region and was contested over twenty-two special stages covering a total competitive distance of 304.66 km (189.31 mi).

Thierry Neuville and Martijn Wydaeghe were the defending rally winners. Hyundai Shell Mobis WRT, were the defending manufacturers' winners. Grégoire Munster and Louis Louka were the defending rally winners in the WRC-2 category.

Elfyn Evans and Scott Martin won their second rally of the season. Their team, Toyota Gazoo Racing WRT, were the manufacturer's winners. Andreas Mikkelsen and Torstein Eriksen won the World Rally Championship-2 category, while Kajetan Kajetanowicz and Maciej Szczepaniak won the 2023 WRC-2 Challenger title. Jason Bailey and Shayne Peterson won the World Rally Championship-3 category.

== Background ==
=== Entry list ===
The following crews entered into the rally. The event was opened to crews competing in the World Rally Championship, its support categories, the World Rally Championship-2, World Rally Championship-3 and privateer entries that were not registered to score points in any championship. Nine entered under Rally1 regulations, as were ten Rally2 crews in the World Rally Championship-2 and one Rally3 crew in the World Rally Championship-3.

Rally1 entries competing in the World Rally Championship
No.	Driver	Co-Driver	Entrant	Car	Championship eligibility	Tyre
4	(Finland) Esapekka Lappi	(Finland) Janne Ferm	(South Korea) Hyundai Shell Mobis WRT	Hyundai i20 N Rally1	Driver, Co-driver, Manufacturer	P
6	(Spain) Dani Sordo	(Spain) Cándido Carrera	(South Korea) Hyundai Shell Mobis WRT	Hyundai i20 N Rally1	Driver, Co-driver, Manufacturer	P
8	(Estonia) Ott Tänak	(Estonia) Martin Järveoja	(United Kingdom) M-Sport Ford WRT	Ford Puma Rally1	Driver, Co-driver, Manufacturer	P
11	(Belgium) Thierry Neuville	(Belgium) Martijn Wydaeghe	(South Korea) Hyundai Shell Mobis WRT	Hyundai i20 N Rally1	Driver, Co-driver, Manufacturer	P
16	(France) Adrien Fourmaux	(France) Alexandre Coria	(United Kingdom) M-Sport Ford WRT	Ford Puma Rally1	Driver, Co-driver, Manufacturer	P
17	(France) Sébastien Ogier	(France) Vincent Landais	(Japan) Toyota Gazoo Racing WRT	Toyota GR Yaris Rally1	Driver, Co-driver, Manufacturer	P
18	(Japan) Takamoto Katsuta	(Republic of Ireland) Aaron Johnston	(Japan) Toyota Gazoo Racing WRT	Toyota GR Yaris Rally1	Driver, Co-driver	P
33	(United Kingdom) Elfyn Evans	(United Kingdom) Scott Martin	(Japan) Toyota Gazoo Racing WRT	Toyota GR Yaris Rally1	Driver, Co-driver, Manufacturer	P
69	(Finland) Kalle Rovanperä	(Finland) Jonne Halttunen	(Japan) Toyota Gazoo Racing WRT	Toyota GR Yaris Rally1	Driver, Co-driver, Manufacturer	P

Rally2 entries competing in the World Rally Championship-2
No.	Driver	Co-Driver	Entrant	Car	Championship eligibility	Tyre
20	(Norway) Andreas Mikkelsen	(Norway) Torstein Eriksen	(Germany) Toksport WRT 3	Škoda Fabia RS Rally2	Driver, Team	P
21	Nikolay Gryazin (Note: Nikolay Gryazin is Russian, but he competes as a neutral competitor using the ANA flag as Russian national emblems were banned by the association due to the Russian invasion of Ukraine.)	Konstantin Aleksandrov (Note: Konstantin Aleksandrov is Russian, but he competes as a neutral competitor using the ANA flag as Russian national emblems were banned by the association due to the Russian invasion of Ukraine.)	(Germany) Toksport WRT 3	Škoda Fabia RS Rally2	Challenger Driver, Challenger Co-driver, Team	P
22	(Poland) Kajetan Kajetanowicz	(Poland) Maciej Szczepaniak	(Poland) Kajetan Kajetanowicz	Škoda Fabia RS Rally2	Challenger Driver, Challenger Co-driver	P
23	(Finland) Heikki Kovalainen	(Japan) Sae Kitagawa	(Finland) Heikki Kovalainen	Škoda Fabia R5	Challenger Driver, Challenger Co-driver, Team	P
25	(Poland) Daniel Chwist	(Poland) Kamil Heller	(Poland) Daniel Chwist	Škoda Fabia Rally2 evo	Challenger Driver, Challenger Co-driver	P
26	(Japan) Osamu Fukunaga	(Japan) Misako Saida	(Japan) Osamu Fukunaga	Škoda Fabia Rally2 evo	Challenger/Masters Driver, Challenger Co-driver	P
27	(Spain) Alexander Villanueva	(Spain) José Murado González	(Spain) Alexander Villanueva	Škoda Fabia RS Rally2	Challenger/Masters Driver, Challenger Co-driver	—N/a
28	(Republic of Ireland) Eamonn Boland	(Republic of Ireland) Michael Joseph Morrissey	(Republic of Ireland) Eamonn Boland	Citroën C3 Rally2	Challenger/Masters Driver, Challenger/Masters Co-driver	P
29	(Spain) Miguel Díaz-Aboitiz	(Spain) Rodrigo Sanjuan de Eusebio	(Spain) Miguel Díaz-Aboitiz	Škoda Fabia RS Rally2	Challenger/Masters Driver, Challenger Co-driver	P
30	(Japan) Satoshi Imai	(New Zealand) Jason Farmer	(Japan) Satoshi Imai	Citroën C3 Rally2	Challenger Driver, Challenger Co-driver	P

Rally3 entries competing in the World Rally Championship-3
No.	Driver	Co-Driver	Entrant	Car	Tyre
31	(Canada) Jason Bailey	(Canada) Shayne Peterson	(Canada) Jason Bailey	Ford Fiesta Rally3	P

Other major entries
No.	Driver	Co-Driver	Entrant	Car	Tyre
24	(Luxembourg) Grégoire Munster	(Belgium) Louis Louka	(United Kingdom) M-Sport Ford WRT	Ford Fiesta Rally2	P

=== Itinerary ===
All dates and times are JST (UTC+9).

Date	No.	Time span	Stage name	Distance
16 November	—	After 9:01	Kuragaike Park [Shakedown]	2.75 km
16 November		After 18:52	Opening ceremony, Toyota Stadium	—N/a
16 November	SS1	After 19:05	Toyota Stadium SSS 1	2.10 km
17 November		5:34 – 5:49	Service A, Toyota Stadium	—N/a
17 November	SS2	After 7:04	Isegami's Tunnel 1	23.60 km
17 November	SS3	After 8:04	Inabu Dam 1	19.38 km
17 November	SS4	After 9:02	Shitara Town 1	22.53 km
17 November		11:11 – 11:41	Regroup, Toyota Stadium	—N/a
17 November		11:41 – 12:21	Service B, Toyota Stadium	—N/a
17 November	SS5	After 13:36	Isegami's Tunnel 2	23.60 km
17 November	SS6	After 14:36	Inabu Dam 2	19.38 km
17 November	SS7	After 15:34	Shitara Town 2	22.53 km
17 November		18:03 – 18:48	Flexi service C, Toyota Stadium	—N/a
17 November	SS8	After 19:35	Toyota Stadium SSS 2	2.10 km
18 November		6:45 – 7:00	Service D, Toyota Stadium	—N/a
18 November	SS9	After 8:04	Nukata Forest 1	20.32 km
18 November	SS10	After 9:05	Lake Mikawako 1	14.78 km
18 November		10:45 – 11:05	Regroup, Okazaki	—N/a
18 November	SS11	After 11:15	Okazaki City SSS 1	3.18 km
18 November	SS12	After 11:26	Okazaki City SSS 2	3.18 km
18 November		11:31 – 12:16	Regroup, Okazaki	—N/a
18 November		12:16 – 12:31	Tyre fitting zone, Okazaki	—N/a
18 November	SS13	After 13:04	Nukata Forest 2	20.32 km
18 November	SS14	After 14:05	Lake Mikawako 2	14.78 km
18 November	SS15	After 15:11	Shinshiro City	6.70 km
18 November		17:01 – 17:46	Flexi service E, Toyota Stadium	—N/a
18 November	SS16	After 19:35	Toyota Stadium SSS 3	2.10 km
19 November		5:39 – 5:54	Service F, Toyota Stadium	—N/a
19 November	SS17	After 7:05	Asahi Kougen 1	7.52 km
19 November	SS18	After 8:03	Ena City 1	22.92 km
19 November	SS19	After 8:56	Nenoue Kougen 1	11.60 km
19 November		9:31 – 10:01	Regroup, Nakatsugawa Park	—N/a
19 November		10:01 – 10:31	Tyre fitting zone, Nakatsugawa Park	—N/a
19 November	SS20	After 11:04	Ena City 2	22.92 km
19 November	SS21	After 11:57	Nenoue Kougen 2	11.60 km
19 November		13:32 – 14:12	Regroup, Asahi Government	—N/a
19 November	SS22	After 14:15	Asahi Kougen 2 [Power Stage]	7.52 km
19 November		After 16:00	Official finish, Toyota Stadium	—N/a

== Report ==
=== WRC Rally1 ===
==== Classification ====
Position		No.	Driver	Co-driver	Entrant	Car	Time	Difference	Points	
Event	Class	No.	Driver	Co-driver	Entrant	Car	Time	Difference	Event	Stage
1	1	33	Elfyn Evans	Scott Martin	Toyota Gazoo Racing WRT	Toyota GR Yaris Rally1	3:32:08.8	0.0	25	0
2	2	17	Sébastien Ogier	Vincent Landais	Toyota Gazoo Racing WRT	Toyota GR Yaris Rally1	3:33:26.5	+1:17.7	18	1
3	3	69	Kalle Rovanperä	Jonne Halttunen	Toyota Gazoo Racing WRT	Toyota GR Yaris Rally1	3:33:55.3	+1:46.5	15	0
4	4	4	Esapekka Lappi	Janne Ferm	Hyundai Shell Mobis WRT	Hyundai i20 N Rally1	3:34:59.1	+2:50.3	12	3
5	5	18	Takamoto Katsuta	Aaron Johnston	Toyota Gazoo Racing WRT	Toyota GR Yaris Rally1	3:35:19.1	+3:10.3	10	2
6	6	8	Ott Tänak	Martin Järveoja	M-Sport Ford WRT	Ford Puma Rally1	3:35:37.1	+3:28.3	8	4
13	7	11	Thierry Neuville	Martijn Wydaeghe	Hyundai Shell Mobis WRT	Hyundai i20 N Rally1	4:00:13.5	+28:04.7	0	5
Retired SS2		6	Dani Sordo	Cándido Carrera	Hyundai Shell Mobis WRT	Hyundai i20 N Rally1	Accident		0	0
Retired SS2		16	Adrien Fourmaux	Alexandre Coria	M-Sport Ford WRT	Ford Puma Rally1	Accident		0	0

==== Special stages ====
Stage	Winners	Car	Time	Class leaders
SD	Neuville / Wydaeghe	Hyundai i20 N Rally1	2:03.0	—N/a
SS1	Neuville / Wydaeghe	Hyundai i20 N Rally1	1:47.6	Neuville / Wydaeghe
SS2	Evans / Martin	Toyota GR Yaris Rally1	20:17.8	Evans / Martin
SS3	Evans / Martin	Toyota GR Yaris Rally1	14:20.0	Evans / Martin
SS4	Stage cancelled			
SS5	Katsuta / Johnston	Toyota GR Yaris Rally1	19:08.1	Evans / Martin
SS6	Katsuta / Johnston	Toyota GR Yaris Rally1	12:48.5	Evans / Martin
SS7	Katsuta / Johnston	Toyota GR Yaris Rally1	14:33.6	Evans / Martin
SS8	Lappi / Ferm	Hyundai i20 N Rally1	2:00.0	Evans / Martin
SS9	Neuville / Wydaeghe	Hyundai i20 N Rally1	15:15.2	Evans / Martin
SS10	Katsuta / Johnston	Toyota GR Yaris Rally1	11:14.8	Evans / Martin
SS11	Evans / Martin	Toyota GR Yaris Rally1	2:20.2	Evans / Martin
SS12	Evans / Martin	Toyota GR Yaris Rally1	2:18.7	Evans / Martin
SS13	Katsuta / Johnston	Toyota GR Yaris Rally1	14:33.5	Evans / Martin
SS14	Katsuta / Johnston	Toyota GR Yaris Rally1	10:35.8	Evans / Martin
SS15	Katsuta / Johnston	Toyota GR Yaris Rally1	3:19.7	Evans / Martin
SS16	Lappi / Ferm	Hyundai i20 N Rally1	1:47.0	Evans / Martin
SS17	Neuville / Wydaeghe	Hyundai i20 N Rally1	5:04.2	Evans / Martin
SS18	Neuville / Wydaeghe	Hyundai i20 N Rally1	18:09.9	Evans / Martin
SS19	Katsuta / Johnston	Toyota GR Yaris Rally1	8:16.3	Evans / Martin
SS20	Neuville / Wydaeghe	Hyundai i20 N Rally1	18:03.7	Evans / Martin
SS21	Katsuta / Johnston	Toyota GR Yaris Rally1	8:16.6	Evans / Martin
SS22	Neuville / Wydaeghe	Hyundai i20 N Rally1	4:48.8	Evans / Martin

==== Championship standings ====
- **Bold text** indicates 2023 World Champions.

Pos.	Drivers' championships			Co-drivers' championships			Manufacturers' championships		
Pos.	Move	Driver	Points	Move	Co-driver	Points	Move	Manufacturer	Points
1		**Kalle Rovanperä**	250		**Jonne Halttunen**	250		**Toyota Gazoo Racing WRT**	548
2		Elfyn Evans	216		Scott Martin	216		Hyundai Shell Mobis WRT	432
3		Thierry Neuville	189		Martijn Wydaeghe	189		M-Sport Ford WRT	287
4		Ott Tänak	174		Martin Järveoja	174			
5		Sébastien Ogier	133		Vincent Landais	133			

=== WRC-2 Rally2 ===
==== Classification ====
Position		No.	Driver	Co-driver	Entrant	Car	Time	Difference	Points		
Event	Class	No.	Driver	Co-driver	Entrant	Car	Time	Difference	Class	Stage	Event
7	1	20	Andreas Mikkelsen	Torstein Eriksen	Toksport WRT 3	Škoda Fabia RS Rally2	3:39:42.5	0.0	25	1	6
8	2	21	Nikolay Gryazin	Konstantin Aleksandrov	Toksport WRT 3	Škoda Fabia RS Rally2	3:40:58.4	+1:15.9	18	3	4
9	3	22	Kajetan Kajetanowicz	Maciej Szczepaniak	Kajetan Kajetanowicz	Škoda Fabia RS Rally2	3:51:34.7	+11:52.2	15	2	2
11	4	26	Osamu Fukunaga	Misako Saida	Osamu Fukunaga	Škoda Fabia Rally2 evo	3:56:47.8	+17:05.3	12	0	0
12	5	25	Daniel Chwist	Kamil Heller	Daniel Chwist	Škoda Fabia Rally2 evo	4:00:01.8	+20:19.3	10	0	0
14	6	28	Eamonn Boland	Michael Joseph Morrissey	Eamonn Boland	Citroën C3 Rally2	4:00:47.4	+21:04.9	8	0	0
18	7	29	Miguel Díaz-Aboitiz	Rodrigo Sanjuan de Eusebio	Miguel Díaz-Aboitiz	Škoda Fabia RS Rally2	4:32:39.2	+52:56.7	6	0	0
24	8	30	Satoshi Imai	Jason Farmer	Satoshi Imai	Citroën C3 Rally2	5:19:31.7	+1:39:49.2	4	0	0
Retired SS14		23	Heikki Kovalainen	Sae Kitagawa	Heikki Kovalainen	Škoda Fabia R5	Transmission		0	0	0
Did not start		27	Alexander Villanueva	José Murado González	Alexander Villanueva	Škoda Fabia RS Rally2	Withdrawn		0	0	0

==== Special stages ====
Overall
Stage	Winners	Car	Time	Class leaders
SD	Mikkelsen / Eriksen	Škoda Fabia RS Rally2	2:09.1	—N/a
SS1	Gryazin / Aleksandrov	Škoda Fabia RS Rally2	1:52.9	Gryazin / Aleksandrov
SS2	Mikkelsen / Eriksen	Škoda Fabia RS Rally2	20:44.6	Mikkelsen / Eriksen
SS3	Mikkelsen / Eriksen	Škoda Fabia RS Rally2	14:36.2	Mikkelsen / Eriksen
SS4	Stage cancelled			
SS5	Gryazin / Aleksandrov	Škoda Fabia RS Rally2	19:58.4	Mikkelsen / Eriksen
SS6	Mikkelsen / Eriksen	Škoda Fabia RS Rally2	13:30.9	Mikkelsen / Eriksen
SS7	Mikkelsen / Eriksen	Škoda Fabia RS Rally2	15:16.9	Mikkelsen / Eriksen
SS8	Mikkelsen / Eriksen	Škoda Fabia RS Rally2	2:05.9	Mikkelsen / Eriksen
SS9	Mikkelsen / Eriksen	Škoda Fabia RS Rally2	16:01.3	Mikkelsen / Eriksen
SS10	Mikkelsen / Eriksen	Škoda Fabia RS Rally2	11:45.4	Mikkelsen / Eriksen
SS11	Gryazin / Aleksandrov	Škoda Fabia RS Rally2	2:25.5	Mikkelsen / Eriksen
SS12	Gryazin / Aleksandrov	Škoda Fabia RS Rally2	2:24.3	Mikkelsen / Eriksen
SS13	Gryazin / Aleksandrov	Škoda Fabia RS Rally2	15:10.0	Mikkelsen / Eriksen
SS14	Mikkelsen / Eriksen	Škoda Fabia RS Rally2	11:48.6	Mikkelsen / Eriksen
SS15	Mikkelsen / Eriksen	Škoda Fabia RS Rally2	3:35.0	Mikkelsen / Eriksen
SS16	Mikkelsen / Eriksen	Škoda Fabia RS Rally2	1:52.1	Mikkelsen / Eriksen
SS17	Mikkelsen / Eriksen	Škoda Fabia RS Rally2	5:21.6	Mikkelsen / Eriksen
SS18	Mikkelsen / Eriksen	Škoda Fabia RS Rally2	18:53.1	Mikkelsen / Eriksen
SS19	Mikkelsen / Eriksen	Škoda Fabia RS Rally2	8:49.1	Mikkelsen / Eriksen
SS20	Mikkelsen / Eriksen	Škoda Fabia RS Rally2	18:47.0	Mikkelsen / Eriksen
SS21	Gryazin / Aleksandrov	Škoda Fabia RS Rally2	8:53.5	Mikkelsen / Eriksen
SS22	Gryazin / Aleksandrov	Škoda Fabia RS Rally2	5:10.2	Mikkelsen / Eriksen

Challenger
Stage	Winners	Car	Time	Class leaders
SD	Gryazin / Aleksandrov	Škoda Fabia RS Rally2	2:10.8	—N/a
SS1	Gryazin / Aleksandrov	Škoda Fabia RS Rally2	1:52.9	Gryazin / Aleksandrov
SS2	Gryazin / Aleksandrov	Škoda Fabia RS Rally2	21:11.1	Gryazin / Aleksandrov
SS3	Gryazin / Aleksandrov	Škoda Fabia RS Rally2	15:07.1	Gryazin / Aleksandrov
SS4	Stage cancelled			
SS5	Gryazin / Aleksandrov	Škoda Fabia RS Rally2	19:58.4	Gryazin / Aleksandrov
SS6	Gryazin / Aleksandrov	Škoda Fabia RS Rally2	13:32.1	Gryazin / Aleksandrov
SS7	Gryazin / Aleksandrov	Škoda Fabia RS Rally2	15:23.4	Gryazin / Aleksandrov
SS8	Gryazin / Aleksandrov	Škoda Fabia RS Rally2	2:06.0	Gryazin / Aleksandrov
SS9	Gryazin / Aleksandrov	Škoda Fabia RS Rally2	16:03.5	Gryazin / Aleksandrov
SS10	Gryazin / Aleksandrov	Škoda Fabia RS Rally2	11:52.9	Gryazin / Aleksandrov
SS11	Gryazin / Aleksandrov	Škoda Fabia RS Rally2	2:25.5	Gryazin / Aleksandrov
SS12	Gryazin / Aleksandrov	Škoda Fabia RS Rally2	2:24.3	Gryazin / Aleksandrov
SS13	Gryazin / Aleksandrov	Škoda Fabia RS Rally2	15:10.0	Gryazin / Aleksandrov
SS14	Gryazin / Aleksandrov	Škoda Fabia RS Rally2	11:55.7	Gryazin / Aleksandrov
SS15	Gryazin / Aleksandrov	Škoda Fabia RS Rally2	3:38.7	Gryazin / Aleksandrov
SS16	Gryazin / Aleksandrov	Škoda Fabia RS Rally2	1:52.5	Gryazin / Aleksandrov
SS17	Gryazin / Aleksandrov	Škoda Fabia RS Rally2	5:23.5	Gryazin / Aleksandrov
SS18	Gryazin / Aleksandrov	Škoda Fabia RS Rally2	19:15.9	Gryazin / Aleksandrov
SS19	Gryazin / Aleksandrov	Škoda Fabia RS Rally2	8:54.7	Gryazin / Aleksandrov
SS20	Gryazin / Aleksandrov	Škoda Fabia RS Rally2	19:05.2	Gryazin / Aleksandrov
SS21	Gryazin / Aleksandrov	Škoda Fabia RS Rally2	8:53.5	Gryazin / Aleksandrov
SS22	Gryazin / Aleksandrov	Škoda Fabia RS Rally2	5:10.2	Gryazin / Aleksandrov

==== Championship standings ====
- **Bold text** indicates 2023 World Champions.

Pos.	Open Drivers' championships			Open Co-drivers' championships			Teams' championships			Challenger Drivers' championships			Challenger Co-drivers' championships		
Pos.	Move	Driver	Points	Move	Co-driver	Points	Move	Manufacturer	Points	Move	Manufacturer	Points	Move	Driver	Points
1		**Andreas Mikkelsen**	134		**Torstein Eriksen**	130	1	**Toksport WRT 3**	207	1	**Kajetan Kajetanowicz**	126	1	**Maciej Szczepaniak**	126
2	1	Gus Greensmith	111	1	Jonas Andersson	111	1	Toksport WRT 2	188	1	Nikolay Gryazin	121	1	Konstantin Aleksandrov	121
3	1	Yohan Rossel	104	1	Arnaud Dunand	104	1	Toksport WRT	135	2	Sami Pajari	118	2	Enni Mälkönen	118
4	3	Nikolay Gryazin	96	3	Konstantin Aleksandrov	103	1	M-Sport Ford WRT	131	1	Mikołaj Marczyk	77		Szymon Gospodarczyk	65
5	1	Kajetan Kajetanowicz	95	1	Maciej Szczepaniak	98		Hyundai Motorsport N	122	1	Marco Bulacia	72		Diego Vallejo	62

=== WRC-3 Rally3 ===
==== Classification ====
Position		No.	Driver	Co-driver	Entrant	Car	Time	Difference	Points
Event	Class	No.	Driver	Co-driver	Entrant	Car	Time	Difference	Points
22	1	55	Jason Bailey	Shayne Peterson	Jason Bailey	Ford Fiesta Rally3	5:03:05.7	0.0	**25**

==== Special stages ====
Stage	Winners	Car	Time	Class leaders
SD	Bailey / Peterson	Ford Fiesta Rally3	2:35.4	—N/a
SS1	Bailey / Peterson	Ford Fiesta Rally3	2:21.0	Bailey / Peterson
SS2	Stage interrupted			
SS3	Bailey / Peterson	Ford Fiesta Rally3	16:53.4	Bailey / Peterson
SS4	Stage cancelled			
SS5	Bailey / Peterson	Ford Fiesta Rally3	24:13.5	Bailey / Peterson
SS6	Bailey / Peterson	Ford Fiesta Rally3	15:52.7	Bailey / Peterson
SS7	Bailey / Peterson	Ford Fiesta Rally3	17:51.1	Bailey / Peterson
SS8	Bailey / Peterson	Ford Fiesta Rally3	2:19.6	Bailey / Peterson
SS9	Bailey / Peterson	Ford Fiesta Rally3	18:36.4	Bailey / Peterson
SS10	Bailey / Peterson	Ford Fiesta Rally3	57:26.9	Bailey / Peterson
SS11	Bailey / Peterson	Ford Fiesta Rally3	3:02.6	Bailey / Peterson
SS12	Bailey / Peterson	Ford Fiesta Rally3	3:48.6	Bailey / Peterson
SS13	Bailey / Peterson	Ford Fiesta Rally3	18:58.6	Bailey / Peterson
SS14	Bailey / Peterson	Ford Fiesta Rally3	13:32.8	Bailey / Peterson
SS15	Bailey / Peterson	Ford Fiesta Rally3	4:19.0	Bailey / Peterson
SS16	Bailey / Peterson	Ford Fiesta Rally3	2:08.5	Bailey / Peterson
SS17	Bailey / Peterson	Ford Fiesta Rally3	6:19.4	Bailey / Peterson
SS18	Bailey / Peterson	Ford Fiesta Rally3	22:23.6	Bailey / Peterson
SS19	Bailey / Peterson	Ford Fiesta Rally3	10:15.7	Bailey / Peterson
SS20	Bailey / Peterson	Ford Fiesta Rally3	22:02.4	Bailey / Peterson
SS21	Bailey / Peterson	Ford Fiesta Rally3	9:59.4	Bailey / Peterson
SS22	Bailey / Peterson	Ford Fiesta Rally3	6:00.7	Bailey / Peterson

==== Championship standings ====
- **Bold text** indicates 2023 World Champions.

Pos.	Drivers' championships			Co-drivers' championships		
Pos.	Move	Driver	Points	Move	Co-driver	Points
1		**Roope Korhonen**	100		**Anssi Viinikka**	100
2		Diego Dominguez Jr.	87		Rogelio Peñate	87
3	8	Jason Bailey	61		Loïc Dumont	55
4	1	Tom Rensonnet	55		Liam Regan	51
5	1	Filip Kohn	52		Conor Mohan	49

== Notes ==
Previous rally: 2023 Central European Rally	2023 FIA World Rally Championship	Next rally: 2024 Monte Carlo Rally (2024)
Previous rally: 2022 Rally Japan	2023 Rally Japan	Next rally: 2024 Rally Japan
