= 2023 Safari Rally =

71st edition of Kenyan automobile rally

2023 Safari Rally Safari Rally Kenya 2023
Round 7 of 13 in the 2023 World Rally Championship
← Previous event	Next event →
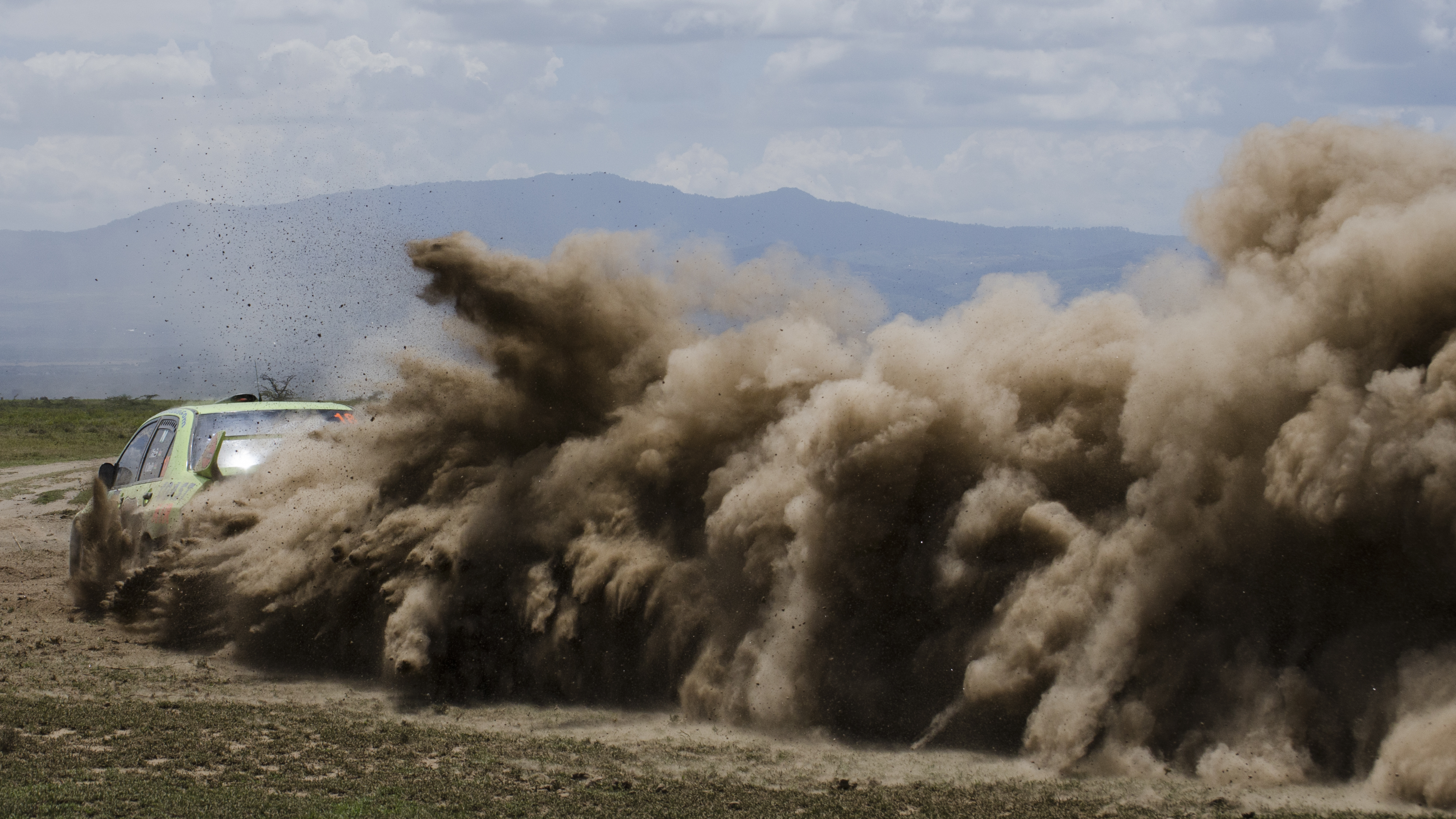
- The rally is featured with rocky and rutted tracks and unpredictable weather.
- Host country: Kenya
- Rally base: Naivasha, Nakuru County
- Dates run: 22 – 25 June 2023
- Start location: Kasarani, Nairobi
- Finish location: Hell's Gate National Park, Naivasha
- Stages: 19 (356.98 km; 221.82 miles)
- Stage surface: Gravel
- Transport distance: 835.49 km (519.15 miles)
- Overall distance: 1,192.47 km (740.97 miles)

Statistics
- Crews registered: 33
- Crews: 31 at start, 20 at finish

Overall results
- Overall winner: (France) Sébastien Ogier (France) Vincent Landais (Japan) Toyota Gazoo Racing WRT; 3:30:42.5
- Power Stage winner: (Estonia) Ott Tänak (Estonia) Martin Järveoja (United Kingdom) M-Sport Ford WRT; 5:35.0

Support category results
- WRC-2 winner: (Poland) Kajetan Kajetanowicz (Poland) Maciej Szczepaniak; 3:57:15.9
- WRC-3 winner: (Paraguay) Diego Dominguez Jr. (Spain) Rogelio Peñate; 4:37:57.1

The 2023 Safari Rally (also known as the Safari Rally Kenya 2023) was a motor racing event for rally cars that was held from 22 June to 25 June 2023. It marked the seventy-first running of the Safari Rally, and was the seventh round of the 2023 World Rally Championship, World Rally Championship-2 and World Rally Championship-3. The event was based in Naivasha in the Nakuru County, and was contested over nineteen special stages covering a total competitive distance of 356.98 km (221.82 mi).

Kalle Rovanperä and Jonne Halttunen were the defending rally winners. Their team, Toyota Gazoo Racing WRT, were the defending manufacturer's winners. Kajetan Kajetanowicz and Maciej Szczepaniak were the defending rally winners in the WRC-2 category. Maxine Wahome and Murage Waigwa were the defending rally winners in the WRC-3 category.

Sébastien Ogier and Vincent Landais won the rally. Their team, Toyota Gazoo Racing WRT, successfully defended their manufacturer's title. Kajetanowicz and Szczepaniak successfully defended their victory in the World Rally Championship-2 category. Diego Dominguez Jr. and Rogelio Peñate won the World Rally Championship-3 category.

The Hyundai Shell Mobis WRT crew of Thierry Neuville and Martijn Wydaeghe was disqualified from the rally post-event for unauthorized reconnaissance of stages, stripping them both of their eighth place finish and of the victory in the Power Stage. The disqualification instead gave the Power Stage victory to Ott Tänak and Martin Järveoja of the M-Sport Ford team.

== Background ==
=== Entry list ===
The following crews entered into the rally. The event was opened to crews competing in the World Rally Championship, its support categories, the World Rally Championship-2, World Rally Championship-3 and privateer entries that were not registered to score points in any championship. Ten entered under Rally1 regulations, as were eleven Rally2 crews in the World Rally Championship-2 and five Rally3 crew in the World Rally Championship-3.

Rally1 entries competing in the World Rally Championship
No.	Driver	Co-Driver	Entrant	Car	Championship eligibility	Tyre
4	(Finland) Esapekka Lappi	(Finland) Janne Ferm	(South Korea) Hyundai Shell Mobis WRT	Hyundai i20 N Rally1	Driver, Co-driver, Manufacturer	P
6	(Spain) Dani Sordo	(Spain) Cándido Carrera	(South Korea) Hyundai Shell Mobis WRT	Hyundai i20 N Rally1	Driver, Co-driver, Manufacturer	P
7	(France) Pierre-Louis Loubet	(Belgium) Nicolas Gilsoul	(United Kingdom) M-Sport Ford WRT	Ford Puma Rally1	Driver, Co-driver, Manufacturer	P
8	(Estonia) Ott Tänak	(Estonia) Martin Järveoja	(United Kingdom) M-Sport Ford WRT	Ford Puma Rally1	Driver, Co-driver, Manufacturer	P
9	(Greece) Jourdan Serderidis	(France) Andy Malfoy	(United Kingdom) M-Sport Ford WRT	Ford Puma Rally1	Driver, Co-driver	P
11	(Belgium) Thierry Neuville	(Belgium) Martijn Wydaeghe	(South Korea) Hyundai Shell Mobis WRT	Hyundai i20 N Rally1	Driver, Co-driver, Manufacturer	P
17	(France) Sébastien Ogier	(France) Vincent Landais	(Japan) Toyota Gazoo Racing WRT	Toyota GR Yaris Rally1	Driver, Co-driver, Manufacturer	P
18	(Japan) Takamoto Katsuta	(Republic of Ireland) Aaron Johnston	(Japan) Toyota Gazoo Racing WRT	Toyota GR Yaris Rally1	Driver, Co-driver	P
33	(United Kingdom) Elfyn Evans	(United Kingdom) Scott Martin	(Japan) Toyota Gazoo Racing WRT	Toyota GR Yaris Rally1	Driver, Co-driver, Manufacturer	P
69	(Finland) Kalle Rovanperä	(Finland) Jonne Halttunen	(Japan) Toyota Gazoo Racing WRT	Toyota GR Yaris Rally1	Driver, Co-driver, Manufacturer	P

Rally2 entries competing in the World Rally Championship-2
No.	Driver	Co-Driver	Entrant	Car	Championship eligibility	Tyre
21	(Poland) Kajetan Kajetanowicz	(Poland) Maciej Szczepaniak	(Poland) Kajetan Kajetanowicz	Škoda Fabia Rally2 evo	Challenger Driver, Challenger Co-driver	P
22	(Luxembourg) Grégoire Munster	(Belgium) Louis Louka	(United Kingdom) M-Sport Ford WRT	Ford Fiesta Rally2	Challenger Driver, Challenger Co-driver, Team	P
23	(Czech Republic) Martin Prokop	(Czech Republic) Zdeněk Jůrka	(Czech Republic) Martin Prokop	Ford Fiesta Rally2	Challenger Driver, Challenger Co-driver	P
24	(Germany) Armin Kremer	(Germany) Timo Gottschalk	(Germany) Armin Kremer	Škoda Fabia Rally2 evo	Challenger/Masters Driver, Challenger Co-driver	P
25	(Kenya) Karan Patel	(Kenya) Tauseef Khan	(Kenya) Karan Patel	Ford Fiesta R5	Challenger Driver, Challenger Co-driver	P
26	(Kenya) Carl Tundo	(Kenya) Tim Jessop	(Kenya) Carl Tundo	Škoda Fabia R5	Challenger Driver, Challenger Co-driver	P
27	(Poland) Daniel Chwist	(Poland) Kamil Heller	(Poland) Daniel Chwist	Škoda Fabia RS Rally2	Challenger Driver, Challenger Co-driver	P
28	(Spain) Miguel Díaz-Aboitiz	(Spain) Rodrigo Sanjuan de Eusebio	(Spain) Miguel Díaz-Aboitiz	Škoda Fabia Rally2 evo	Challenger/Masters Driver, Challenger Co-driver	P
29	(Greece) George Vassilakis	(United Kingdom) Tom Krawszik	(United Kingdom) M-Sport Ford WRT	Ford Fiesta Rally2	Challenger/Masters Driver, Challenger Co-driver, Team	P
30	(Kenya) Aakif Virani	(Kenya) Azhar Bhatti	(Kenya) Aakif Virani	Škoda Fabia R5	Challenger Driver, Challenger Co-driver	P
31	(Kenya) Piero Canobbio	(Italy) Flavio Zanella	(Kenya) Piero Canobbio	Hyundai i20 R5	Challenger/Masters Driver, Challenger/Masters Co-driver	—N/a
32	(Kenya) Samman Singh Vohra	(Kenya) Alfir Khan	(Kenya) Samman Singh Vohra	Škoda Fabia Rally2 evo	Challenger Driver, Challenger Co-driver	P

Rally3 entries competing in the World Rally Championship-3
No.	Driver	Co-Driver	Entrant	Car	Tyre
34	(Paraguay) Diego Dominguez Jr.	(Spain) Rogelio Peñate	(Paraguay) Diego Dominguez Jr.	Ford Fiesta Rally3	P
35	(Kenya) Hamza Anwar	(Kenya) Adnan Din	Rally Stars Program Kenya	Ford Fiesta Rally3	P
36	(Kenya) Jeremiah Wahome	(Kenya) Victor Okundi	(Kenya) Jeremiah Wahome	Ford Fiesta Rally3	P
37	(Kenya) McRae Kimathi	(Kenya) Mwangi Kioni	(Kenya) McRae Kimathi	Ford Fiesta Rally3	P
38	(Canada) Jason Bailey	(Canada) Jamie Willetts	(Canada) Jason Bailey	Ford Fiesta Rally3	P

Other major entries
No.	Driver	Co-Driver	Entrant	Car	Tyre
20	(Sweden) Oliver Solberg	(United Kingdom) Elliott Edmondson	(Sweden) Oliver Solberg	Škoda Fabia Rally2 evo	P

=== Itinerary ===
All dates and times are EAT (UTC+3).

Date	No.	Time span	Stage name	Distance
21 June	—	After 10:01	Loldia [Shakedown]	5.40 km
22 June	SS1	After 14:05	Super Special Kasarani	4.84 km
23 June		7:00 – 7:15	Service A, KWS Naivasha	—N/a
23 June	SS2	After 8:00	Loldia 1	19.17 km
23 June	SS3	After 9:18	Geothermal 1	13.12 km
23 June	SS4	After 10:11	Kedong 1	30.48 km
23 June		11:14 – 11:44	Regroup, KWS Naivasha	—N/a
23 June		11:44 – 12:24	Service B, KWS Naivasha	—N/a
23 June	SS5	After 13:09	Loldia 2	19.17 km
23 June	SS6	After 14:27	Geothermal 2	13.12 km
23 June	SS7	After 15:20	Kedong 2	30.48 km
23 June		16:33 – 17:18	Flexi Service C, KWS Naivasha	—N/a
24 June	SS8	After 8:01	Soysambu 1	19.17 km
24 June	SS9	After 9:05	Elmenteita 1	15.08 km
24 June	SS10	After 10:03	Sleeping Warrior 1	31.04 km
24 June		11:29 – 11:55	Regroup, KWS Naivasha	—N/a
24 June		11:55 – 12:35	Service D, KWS Naivasha	—N/a
24 June	SS11	After 14:01	Soysambu 2	19.17 km
24 June	SS12	After 15:05	Elmenteita 2	15.08 km
24 June	SS13	After 16:03	Sleeping Warrior 2	31.04 km
24 June		17:39 – 18:24	Flexi Service E, KWS Naivasha	—N/a
25 June	SS14	After 6:55	Malewa 1	9.00 km
25 June	SS15	After 7:51	Oserian 1	18.33 km
25 June	SS16	After 9:05	Hell's Gate 1	10.53 km
25 June		10:12 – 10:22	Regroup, KWS Naivasha	—N/a
25 June		10:22 – 10:37	Service F, KWS Naivasha	—N/a
25 June	SS17	After 11:12	Malewa 2	9.00 km
25 June	SS18	After 12:08	Oserian 2	18.33 km
25 June		13:16 – 14:07	Regroup, KWS Naivasha	—N/a
25 June	SS19	After 14:15	Hell's Gate 2 [Power Stage]	10.53 km
25 June		After 16:00	Podium ceremony, KWS Naivasha	—N/a

== Report ==
=== WRC Rally1 ===
==== Classification ====
Position		No.	Driver	Co-driver	Entrant	Car	Time	Difference	Points	
Event	Class	No.	Driver	Co-driver	Entrant	Car	Time	Difference	Event	Stage
1	1	17	Sébastien Ogier	Vincent Landais	Toyota Gazoo Racing WRT	Toyota GR Yaris Rally1	3:30:42.5	0.0	25	3
2	2	69	Kalle Rovanperä	Jonne Halttunen	Toyota Gazoo Racing WRT	Toyota GR Yaris Rally1	3:30:49.2	+6.7	18	4
3	3	33	Elfyn Evans	Scott Martin	Toyota Gazoo Racing WRT	Toyota GR Yaris Rally1	3:33:41.0	+2:58.5	15	1
4	4	18	Takamoto Katsuta	Aaron Johnston	Toyota Gazoo Racing WRT	Toyota GR Yaris Rally1	3:34:06.3	+3:23.8	12	0
5	5	6	Dani Sordo	Cándido Carrera	Hyundai Shell Mobis WRT	Hyundai i20 N Rally1	3:35:47.9	+5:05.4	10	0
6	6	8	Ott Tänak	Martin Järveoja	M-Sport Ford WRT	Ford Puma Rally1	3:39:56.9	+9:14.4	8	5
7	7	7	Pierre-Louis Loubet	Nicolas Gilsoul	M-Sport Ford WRT	Ford Puma Rally1	3:46:58.2	+16:15.7	6	0
12	8	4	Esapekka Lappi	Janne Ferm	Hyundai Shell Mobis WRT	Hyundai i20 N Rally1	4:12:57.4	+42:14.9	0	2
Retired SS12		9	Jourdan Serderidis	Andy Malfoy	M-Sport Ford WRT	Ford Puma Rally1	Engine		0	0
Disqualified		11	Thierry Neuville	Martijn Wydaeghe	Hyundai Shell Mobis WRT	Hyundai i20 N Rally1	Reconnaissance breach		0	0

==== Special stages ====
Stage	Winners	Car	Time	Class leaders
SD	Rovanperä / Halttunen	Toyota GR Yaris Rally1	3:32.4	—N/a
SS1	Tänak / Järveoja	Ford Puma Rally1	3:14.3	Tänak / Järveoja
SS2	Ogier / Landais	Toyota GR Yaris Rally1	13:50.3	Ogier / Landais
SS3	Lappi / Ferm	Hyundai i20 N Rally1	6:49.7	Ogier / Landais
SS4	Rovanperä / Halttunen	Toyota GR Yaris Rally1	14:52.4	Ogier / Landais
SS5	Ogier / Landais	Toyota GR Yaris Rally1	13:50.2	Ogier / Landais
SS6	Ogier / Landais	Toyota GR Yaris Rally1	6:46.5	Ogier / Landais
SS7	Ogier / Landais	Toyota GR Yaris Rally1	15:04.6	Ogier / Landais
SS8	Ogier / Landais	Toyota GR Yaris Rally1	17:30.0	Ogier / Landais
SS9	Rovanperä / Halttunen	Toyota GR Yaris Rally1	8:25.2	Ogier / Landais
SS10	Rovanperä / Halttunen	Toyota GR Yaris Rally1	17:57.7	Ogier / Landais
SS11	Ogier / Landais	Toyota GR Yaris Rally1	17:23.4	Ogier / Landais
SS12	Katsuta / Johnston	Toyota GR Yaris Rally1	8:20.6	Ogier / Landais
SS13	Rovanperä / Halttunen	Toyota GR Yaris Rally1	19:07.7	Ogier / Landais
SS14	Rovanperä / Halttunen	Toyota GR Yaris Rally1	6:05.1	Ogier / Landais
SS15	Ogier / Landais	Toyota GR Yaris Rally1	11:15.9	Ogier / Landais
SS16	Tänak / Järveoja	Ford Puma Rally1	5:29.7	Ogier / Landais
SS17	Rovanperä / Halttunen	Toyota GR Yaris Rally1	6:02.6	Ogier / Landais
SS18	Katsuta / Johnston	Toyota GR Yaris Rally1	11:53.6	Ogier / Landais
SS19	Tänak / Järveoja	Ford Puma Rally1	5:35.0	Ogier / Landais

==== Championship standings ====
Pos.	Drivers' championships			Co-drivers' championships			Manufacturers' championships		
Pos.	Move	Driver	Points	Move	Co-driver	Points	Move	Manufacturer	Points
1		Kalle Rovanperä	140		Jonne Halttunen	140		Toyota Gazoo Racing WRT	285
2	2	Elfyn Evans	99	2	Scott Martin	99		Hyundai Shell Mobis WRT	237
3	2	Sébastien Ogier	98	2	Vincent Landais	98		M-Sport Ford WRT	175
4	1	Ott Tänak	98	1	Martin Järveoja	98			
5	3	Thierry Neuville	93	3	Martijn Wydaeghe	93			

=== WRC-2 Rally2 ===
==== Classification ====
Position		No.	Driver	Co-driver	Entrant	Car	Time	Difference	Points		
Event	Class	No.	Driver	Co-driver	Entrant	Car	Time	Difference	Class	Stage	Event
8	1	21	Kajetan Kajetanowicz	Maciej Szczepaniak	Kajetan Kajetanowicz	Škoda Fabia Rally2 evo	3:57:15.9	0.0	25	3	4
10	2	23	Martin Prokop	Zdeněk Jůrka	Martin Prokop	Ford Fiesta Rally2	4:08:43.6	+11:27.7	18	2	1
11	3	26	Carl Tundo	Tim Jessop	Carl Tundo	Škoda Fabia R5	4:11:38.6	+14:22.7	15	0	0
13	4	24	Armin Kremer	Timo Gottschalk	Armin Kremer	Škoda Fabia Rally2 evo	4:14:40.8	+17:24.9	12	1	0
15	5	27	Daniel Chwist	Kamil Heller	Daniel Chwist	Škoda Fabia RS Rally2	4:52:52.1	+55:36.2	10	0	0
16	6	32	Samman Singh Vohra	Alfir Khan	Samman Singh Vohra	Škoda Fabia Rally2 evo	5:23:48.3	+1:26:32.4	8	0	0
Retired SS19		30	Aakif Virani	Azhar Bhatti	Aakif Virani	Škoda Fabia R5	Withdrawn		0	0	0
Retired SS17		22	Grégoire Munster	Louis Louka	M-Sport Ford WRT	Ford Fiesta Rally2	Fire		0	0	0
Retired SS17		25	Karan Patel	Tauseef Khan	Karan Patel	Ford Fiesta R5	Withdrawn		0	0	0
Retired SS13		29	George Vassilakis	Tom Krawszik	M-Sport Ford WRT	Ford Fiesta Rally2	Accident		0	0	0
Retired SS10		28	Miguel Díaz-Aboitiz	Rodrigo Sanjuan de Eusebio	Miguel Díaz-Aboitiz	Škoda Fabia Rally2 evo	Withdrawn		0	0	0
Did not start		31	Piero Canobbio	Flavio Zanella	Piero Canobbio	Hyundai i20 R5	Withdrawn		0	0	0

==== Special stages ====
Overall
Stage	Winners	Car	Time	Class leaders
SD	Kajetanowicz / Szczepaniak	Škoda Fabia Rally2 evo	3:57.3	—N/a
SS1	Kajetanowicz / Szczepaniak	Škoda Fabia Rally2 evo	3:27.2	Kajetanowicz / Szczepaniak
SS2	Kajetanowicz / Szczepaniak	Škoda Fabia Rally2 evo	15:08.3	Kajetanowicz / Szczepaniak
SS3	Kajetanowicz / Szczepaniak	Škoda Fabia Rally2 evo	7:35.0	Kajetanowicz / Szczepaniak
SS4	Munster / Louka	Ford Fiesta Rally2	17:16.3	Munster / Louka
SS5	Munster / Louka	Ford Fiesta Rally2	15:04.4	Munster / Louka
SS6	Kajetanowicz / Szczepaniak	Škoda Fabia Rally2 evo	7:29.0	Munster / Louka
SS7	Munster / Louka	Ford Fiesta Rally2	17:12.2	Munster / Louka
SS8	Kajetanowicz / Szczepaniak	Škoda Fabia Rally2 evo	19:48.5	Munster / Louka
SS9	Kajetanowicz / Szczepaniak	Škoda Fabia Rally2 evo	9:21.1	Munster / Louka
SS10	Kajetanowicz / Szczepaniak	Škoda Fabia Rally2 evo	19:40.7	Kajetanowicz / Szczepaniak
SS11	Munster / Louka	Ford Fiesta Rally2	18:56.0	Munster / Louka
SS12	Kajetanowicz / Szczepaniak	Škoda Fabia Rally2 evo	9:07.1	Kajetanowicz / Szczepaniak
SS13	Kajetanowicz / Szczepaniak	Škoda Fabia Rally2 evo	22:42.8	Kajetanowicz / Szczepaniak
SS14	Munster / Louka	Ford Fiesta Rally2	6:46.4	Kajetanowicz / Szczepaniak
SS15	Munster / Louka	Ford Fiesta Rally2	12:45.6	Kajetanowicz / Szczepaniak
SS16	Kajetanowicz / Szczepaniak	Škoda Fabia Rally2 evo	6:02.9	Kajetanowicz / Szczepaniak
SS17	Chwist / Heller	Škoda Fabia RS Rally2	6:39.1	Kajetanowicz / Szczepaniak
SS18	Kajetanowicz / Szczepaniak	Škoda Fabia Rally2 evo	13:25.0	Kajetanowicz / Szczepaniak
SS19	Kajetanowicz / Szczepaniak	Škoda Fabia Rally2 evo	6:14.6	Kajetanowicz / Szczepaniak

Challenger
Stage	Winners	Car	Time	Class leaders
SD	Kajetanowicz / Szczepaniak	Škoda Fabia Rally2 evo	3:57.3	—N/a
SS1	Kajetanowicz / Szczepaniak	Škoda Fabia Rally2 evo	3:27.2	Kajetanowicz / Szczepaniak
SS2	Kajetanowicz / Szczepaniak	Škoda Fabia Rally2 evo	15:08.3	Kajetanowicz / Szczepaniak
SS3	Kajetanowicz / Szczepaniak	Škoda Fabia Rally2 evo	7:35.0	Kajetanowicz / Szczepaniak
SS4	Munster / Louka	Ford Fiesta Rally2	17:16.3	Munster / Louka
SS5	Munster / Louka	Ford Fiesta Rally2	15:04.4	Munster / Louka
SS6	Kajetanowicz / Szczepaniak	Škoda Fabia Rally2 evo	7:29.0	Munster / Louka
SS7	Munster / Louka	Ford Fiesta Rally2	17:12.2	Munster / Louka
SS8	Kajetanowicz / Szczepaniak	Škoda Fabia Rally2 evo	19:48.5	Munster / Louka
SS9	Kajetanowicz / Szczepaniak	Škoda Fabia Rally2 evo	9:21.1	Munster / Louka
SS10	Kajetanowicz / Szczepaniak	Škoda Fabia Rally2 evo	19:40.7	Kajetanowicz / Szczepaniak
SS11	Munster / Louka	Ford Fiesta Rally2	18:56.0	Munster / Louka
SS12	Kajetanowicz / Szczepaniak	Škoda Fabia Rally2 evo	9:07.1	Kajetanowicz / Szczepaniak
SS13	Kajetanowicz / Szczepaniak	Škoda Fabia Rally2 evo	22:42.8	Kajetanowicz / Szczepaniak
SS14	Munster / Louka	Ford Fiesta Rally2	6:46.4	Kajetanowicz / Szczepaniak
SS15	Munster / Louka	Ford Fiesta Rally2	12:45.6	Kajetanowicz / Szczepaniak
SS16	Kajetanowicz / Szczepaniak	Škoda Fabia Rally2 evo	6:02.9	Kajetanowicz / Szczepaniak
SS17	Chwist / Heller	Škoda Fabia RS Rally2	6:39.1	Kajetanowicz / Szczepaniak
SS18	Kajetanowicz / Szczepaniak	Škoda Fabia Rally2 evo	13:25.0	Kajetanowicz / Szczepaniak
SS19	Kajetanowicz / Szczepaniak	Škoda Fabia Rally2 evo	6:14.6	Kajetanowicz / Szczepaniak

==== Championship standings ====
Pos.	Open Drivers' championships			Open Co-drivers' championships			Teams' championships			Challenger Drivers' championships			Challenger Co-drivers' championships		
Pos.	Move	Driver	Points	Move	Co-driver	Points	Move	Manufacturer	Points	Move	Manufacturer	Points	Move	Driver	Points
1		Yohan Rossel	77		Arnaud Dunand	77		M-Sport Ford WRT	91	1	Kajetan Kajetanowicz	75	1	Maciej Szczepaniak	75
2		Oliver Solberg	64		Elliott Edmondson	64		Toksport WRT	80	1	Nikolay Gryazin	50	1	Konstantin Aleksandrov	50
3		Gus Greensmith	62		Jonas Andersson	62		Hyundai Motorsport N	73		Marco Bulacia	50		Enni Mälkönen	43
4	5	Kajetan Kajetanowicz	55		Torstein Eriksen	61		Toksport WRT 3	68	5	Martin Prokop	44		Diego Vallejo	40
5	1	Emil Lindholm	44	4	Maciej Szczepaniak	55		Toksport WRT 2	65	1	Sami Pajari	43		Borja Rozada	33

=== WRC-3 Rally3 ===
==== Classification ====
Position		No.	Driver	Co-driver	Entrant	Car	Time	Difference	Points
Event	Class	No.	Driver	Co-driver	Entrant	Car	Time	Difference	Points
14	1	34	Diego Dominguez Jr.	Rogelio Peñate	Diego Dominguez Jr.	Ford Fiesta Rally3	4:37:57.1	0.0	25
17	2	38	Jason Bailey	Jamie Willetts	Jason Bailey	Ford Fiesta Rally3	5:33:05.9	+55:08.8	18
18	3	37	McRae Kimathi	Mwangi Kioni	McRae Kimathi	Ford Fiesta Rally3	5:43:54.7	+1:05:57.6	15
Retired SS14		36	Jeremiah Wahome	Victor Okundi	Jeremiah Wahome	Ford Fiesta Rally3	Withdrawn		0
Retired SS8		35	Hamza Anwar	Adnan Din	Rally Stars Program Kenya	Ford Fiesta Rally3	Withdrawn		0

==== Special stages ====
Stage	Winners	Car	Time	Class leaders
SD	Dominguez Jr. / Peñate	Ford Fiesta Rally3	4:30.0	—N/a
SS1	Dominguez Jr. / Peñate	Ford Fiesta Rally3	3:40.6	Dominguez Jr. / Peñate
SS2	Anwar / Din	Ford Fiesta Rally3	16:40.3	Dominguez Jr. / Peñate
SS3	Dominguez Jr. / Peñate	Ford Fiesta Rally3	8:19.6	Dominguez Jr. / Peñate
SS4	Anwar / Din	Ford Fiesta Rally3	18:43.7	Anwar / Din
SS5	Anwar / Din	Ford Fiesta Rally3	16:31.4	Anwar / Din
SS6	Dominguez Jr. / Peñate	Ford Fiesta Rally3	8:10.0	Anwar / Din
SS7	Dominguez Jr. / Peñate	Ford Fiesta Rally3	19:03.6	Dominguez Jr. / Peñate
SS8	Bailey / Willetts	Ford Fiesta Rally3	22:47.8	Dominguez Jr. / Peñate
SS9	Dominguez Jr. / Peñate	Ford Fiesta Rally3	11:14.7	Dominguez Jr. / Peñate
SS10	Dominguez Jr. / Peñate	Ford Fiesta Rally3	24:12.5	Dominguez Jr. / Peñate
SS11	Dominguez Jr. / Peñate	Ford Fiesta Rally3	23:52.8	Dominguez Jr. / Peñate
SS12	Dominguez Jr. / Peñate	Ford Fiesta Rally3	11:41.5	Dominguez Jr. / Peñate
SS13	Dominguez Jr. / Peñate	Ford Fiesta Rally3	26:56.8	Dominguez Jr. / Peñate
SS14	Bailey / Willetts	Ford Fiesta Rally3	8:00.8	Dominguez Jr. / Peñate
SS15	Dominguez Jr. / Peñate	Ford Fiesta Rally3	15:11.6	Dominguez Jr. / Peñate
SS16	Dominguez Jr. / Peñate	Ford Fiesta Rally3	7:19.5	Dominguez Jr. / Peñate
SS17	Bailey / Willetts	Ford Fiesta Rally3	7:58.3	Dominguez Jr. / Peñate
SS18	Dominguez Jr. / Peñate	Ford Fiesta Rally3	16:32.9	Dominguez Jr. / Peñate
SS19	Dominguez Jr. / Peñate	Ford Fiesta Rally3	7:46.1	Dominguez Jr. / Peñate

==== Championship standings ====
Pos.	Drivers' championships			Co-drivers' championships		
Pos.	Move	Driver	Points	Move	Co-driver	Points
1		Roope Korhonen	75		Anssi Viinikka	75
2	1	Diego Dominguez Jr.	62	1	Rogelio Peñate	62
3	1	William Creighton	46	1	Liam Regan	46
4	6	Jason Bailey	36		Loïc Dumont	36
5	1	Tom Rensonnet	36		Conor Mohan	31

Previous rally: 2023 Rally Italia Sardegna	2023 FIA World Rally Championship	Next rally: 2023 Rally Estonia
Previous rally: 2022 Safari Rally	2023 Safari Rally	Next rally: 2024 Safari Rally
