= 2023 WRC3 Championship =

The 2023 FIA WRC3 Championship was the tenth season of WRC3, a rallying championship organised and governed by the Fédération Internationale de l'Automobile as the third-highest tier of international rallying. It was open to privateers and teams using cars complying with Group Rally3 regulations. The championship began in January 2023 with the Rallye Monte-Carlo and concluded in November 2023 with Rally Japan, and ran in support of the 2023 World Rally Championship.

Lauri Joona and Enni Mälkönen entered as the defending drivers' and co-drivers' champions.

Roope Korhonen and Anssi Viinikka won the 2023 drivers and codrivers championships.

== Calendar ==
A map showing the locations of the rallies in the 2023 championship. Event headquarters are marked with black dots.

The 2023 season was contested over thirteen rounds crossing Europe, Africa, North and South America, and Asia.

| Round | Start date | Finish date | Rally | Rally headquarters | Surface | Stages | Distance | Ref. |
|---|---|---|---|---|---|---|---|---|
| 1 | 19 January | 22 January | (Monaco) Rallye Automobile Monte Carlo | Monte Carlo, Monaco | Mixed (Note: The Monte Carlo Rally is run on a tarmac and snow surface.) | 18 | 325.02 km | |
| 2 | 9 February | 12 February | Rally Sweden | Umeå, Västerbotten County, Sweden | Snow | 18 | 301.18 km | |
| 3 | 16 March | 19 March | (Mexico) Rally Guanajuato México | León, Guanajuato, Mexico | Gravel | 23 | 315.69 km | |
| 4 | 20 April | 23 April | Croatia Rally | Zagreb, Croatia | Tarmac | 20 | 301.26 km | |
| 5 | 11 May | 14 May | Rally de Portugal | Matosinhos, Porto, Portugal | Gravel | 19 | 329.06 km | |
| 6 | 1 June | 4 June | (Italy) Rally Italia Sardegna | Olbia, Sardinia, Italy | Gravel | 19 | 322.88 km | |
| 7 | 22 June | 25 June | Safari Rally Kenya | Naivasha, Nakuru County, Kenya | Gravel | 19 | 355.92 km | |
| 8 | 20 July | 23 July | Rally Estonia | Tartu, Estonia | Gravel | 21 | 300.41 km | |
| 9 | 3 August | 6 August | Rally Finland | Jyväskylä, Central Finland, Finland | Gravel | 22 | 320.56 km | |
| 10 | 7 September | 10 September | Acropolis Rally Greece | Lamia, Central Greece, Greece | Gravel | 15 | 270.89 km | |
| 11 | 28 September | 1 October | Rally Chile | Concepción, Biobío, Chile | Gravel | 16 | 321.06 km | |
| 12 | 26 October | 29 October | (Europe) Central European Rally | Passau, Bavaria, Germany | Tarmac | 18 | 310.01 km | |
| 13 | 16 November | 19 November | Rally Japan | Toyota, Aichi, Japan | Tarmac | 22 | 304.66 km | |

=== Calendar changes ===
The championship was expected to be expanded to fourteen rounds from the thirteen rounds in the previous season by WRC Promoter GmbH, with eight Europe-based rallies and six fly-away events covering the season. However, when the calendar was released in late November following a lengthy delay, the number of the events was reduced to thirteen with the anticipated Saudi Arabian rally based at Jeddah, absent from the calendar.

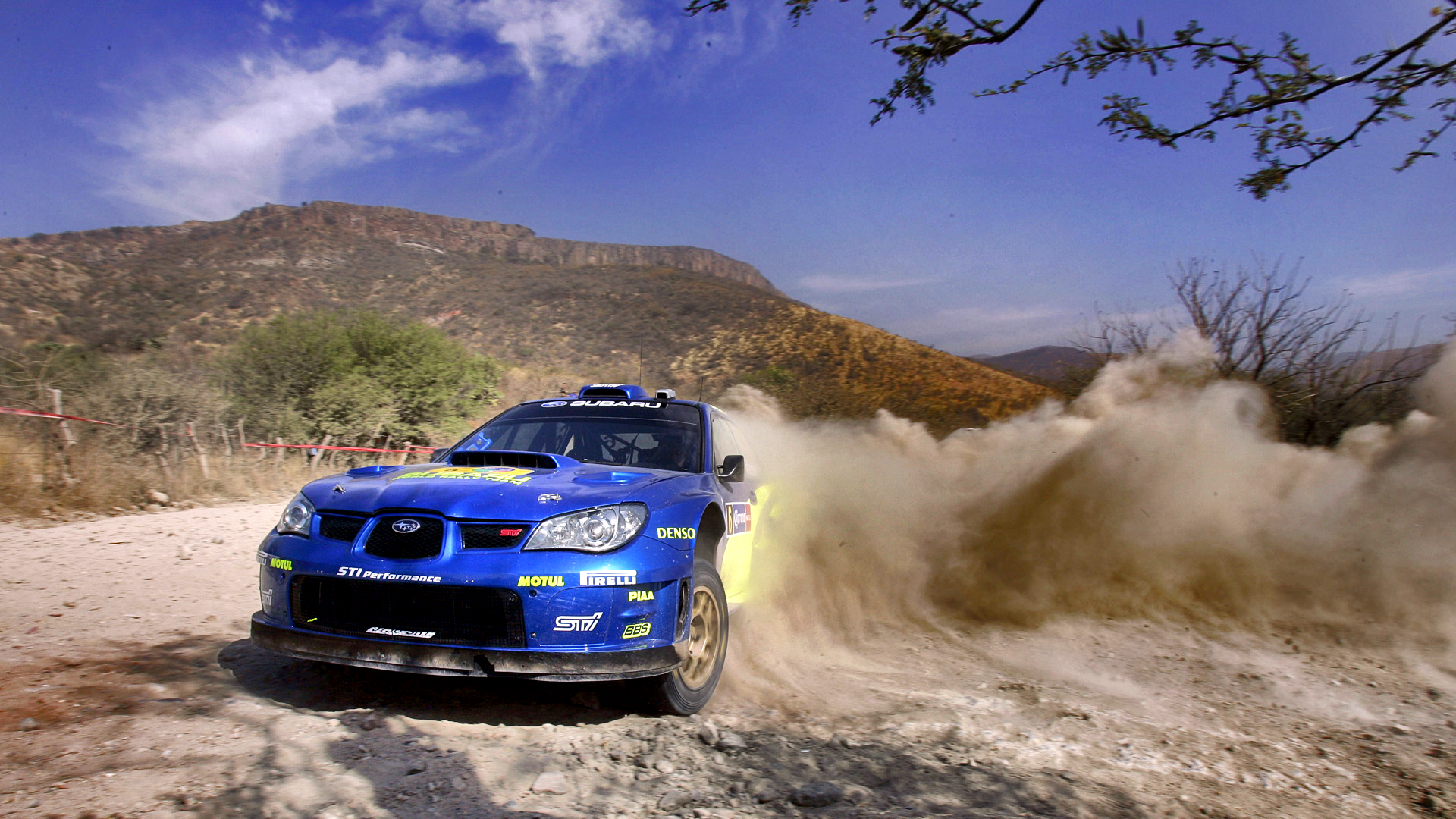
Rally Mexico (pictured in 2008 with a Subaru Impreza WRC) returned to the calendar.

- Rally Mexico returned to championship after missing the 2021 and 2022 championships. The organizers of the rally had previously held a national event in 2022 as a prelude for the 2023 return.
- Rally Chile rejoined the calendar after having been ruled out in 2020 and 2021 due to the Chilean protests and COVID-19 pandemic respectively.
- The Central European Rally, a tri-nation event held across Germany, Austria and the Czech Republic, was introduced into the championship, replacing the Catalonian Rally. The rally was based out of southeast Germany, in the city of Passau in Bavaria, and ran on tarmac.
- Rally New Zealand, a round of the 2022 season, was not included on the calendar, but the organizers tried to seek an opportunity for a 2024 return as a part of the rotation program with Rally Australia.
- Ypres Rally Belgium, which was a part of the championship for the prior two seasons, dropped off the calendar and instead formed part of the 2023 British Rally Championship.

Several rally organizers also expressed their interests to return to the championship, including Rally Argentina, Rally Australia, the German Rally, and an event in Northern Ireland. The Argentine, Australian and Northern Irish bids failed and Germany organized the Central European Rally along with Austria and the Czech Republic. In addition to the candidate events, the WRC Promoter GmbH was also working on the calendar expansion to the Middle East and United States, but no rallies were added for the 2023 season.

=== Location changes ===
- The headquarters of the Rally Italia Sardegna would be once again moved from Alghero to Olbia. The 2020 event was previously headquartered in Olbia as a result of major route revisions due to the COVID-19 pandemic.
- The 2023 edition of the Safari Rally was headquartered at the Lakeside town of Naivasha. The rally was previously headquartered in the Kenyan capital Nairobi.

== Entries ==
The following crews are set to enter into the 2023 WRC3 Championship:

| Car | Entrant | Driver name | Co-driver name | Rounds |
|---|---|---|---|---|
| Ford Fiesta Rally3 | (Kenya) Hamza Anwar | (Kenya) Hamza Anwar | (Kenya) Adnan Din | 2, 6–7 |
| Ford Fiesta Rally3 | (Kenya) Hamza Anwar | (Kenya) Hamza Anwar | (Republic of Ireland) Martin Brady | 4 |
| Ford Fiesta Rally3 | (Kenya) Hamza Anwar | (Kenya) Hamza Anwar | (United States) Alexander Kihurani | 8 |
| Ford Fiesta Rally3 | (Kenya) Hamza Anwar | (Kenya) Hamza Anwar | (Sweden) Julia Thulin | 10 |
| Ford Fiesta Rally3 | (Canada) Jason Bailey | (Canada) Jason Bailey | (Canada) Shayne Peterson | 3, 13 |
| Ford Fiesta Rally3 | (Canada) Jason Bailey | (Canada) Jason Bailey | (Canada) Jamie Willetts | 7 |
| Ford Fiesta Rally3 | (Spain) Roberto Blach | (Spain) Roberto Blach | (Spain) Mauro Barreiro | 4, 6, 8, 10 |
| Ford Fiesta Rally3 | (Kazakhstan) Petr Borodin | (Kazakhstan) Petr Borodin | (Kazakhstan) Roman Cheprassov | 9 |
| Ford Fiesta Rally3 | (Peru) Eduardo Castro | (Peru) Eduardo Castro | (Spain) Carla Salvat Trías | 10 |
| Ford Fiesta Rally3 | (Peru) Eduardo Castro | (Peru) Eduardo Castro | (Argentina) Fernando Mussano | 11 |
| Ford Fiesta Rally3 | (Republic of Ireland) Brendan Cumiskey | (Republic of Ireland) Brendan Cumiskey | (Republic of Ireland) Arthur Kierans | 8 |
| Ford Fiesta Rally3 | (Republic of Ireland) Brendan Cumiskey | (Republic of Ireland) Brendan Cumiskey | (Republic of Ireland) Martin Connolly | 9 |
| Ford Fiesta Rally3 | (Greece) Giorgos Delaportas | (Greece) Giorgos Delaportas | (Greece) Evangelos Panaritis | 10 |
| Ford Fiesta Rally3 | (Paraguay) Diego Domínguez Jr. | (Paraguay) Diego Domínguez Jr. | (Spain) Rogelio Peñate | 2–3, 7, 10–11 |
| Ford Fiesta Rally3 | (Greece) Spiros Galerakis | (Greece) Spiros Galerakis | (Greece) Konstantinos Soukoulis | 10 |
| Ford Fiesta Rally3 | (Finland) Toni Herranen | (Finland) Toni Herranen | (Finland) Mikko Lukka | 2, 5, 8–9 |
| Ford Fiesta Rally3 | (Finland) Jesse Kallio | (Finland) Jesse Kallio | (Finland) Jussi Lindberg | 2, 9 |
| Ford Fiesta Rally3 | (Greece) Epaminondas Karanikolas | (Greece) Epaminondas Karanikolas | (Greece) Giorgos Kakavas | 10 |
| Ford Fiesta Rally3 | (Kenya) McRae Kimathi | (Kenya) McRae Kimathi | (Kenya) Mwangi Kioni | 7 |
| Ford Fiesta Rally3 | (Czech Republic) Filip Kohn | (Czech Republic) Filip Kohn | (Czech Republic) Tomáš Střeska | 2, 4 |
| Ford Fiesta Rally3 | (Czech Republic) Filip Kohn | (Czech Republic) Filip Kohn | (United Kingdom) Tom Woodburn | 6, 9, 12 |
| Ford Fiesta Rally3 | (Finland) Benjamin Korhola | (Finland) Benjamin Korhola | (Finland) Pekka Kelander | 8–9 |
| Ford Fiesta Rally3 | (Finland) Roope Korhonen | (Finland) Roope Korhonen | (Finland) Anssi Viinikka | 2, 5–6, 8 |
| Ford Fiesta Rally3 | (Finland) Ville Laakso | (Finland) Ville Laakso | (Finland) Jani Luhtaniemi | 9 |
| Ford Fiesta Rally3 | (Republic of Ireland) Motorsport Ireland Rally Academy | (Republic of Ireland) William Creighton | (Republic of Ireland) Liam Regan | 2, 4, 6, 8, 10 |
| Ford Fiesta Rally3 | (Republic of Ireland) Motorsport Ireland Rally Academy | (Republic of Ireland) Eamonn Kelly | (Republic of Ireland) Conor Mohan | 2, 4, 6, 8, 10 |
| Ford Fiesta Rally3 | (Finland) Kristian Nieminen | (Finland) Kristian Nieminen | (Finland) Valtteri Nieminen | 9 |
| Ford Fiesta Rally3 | (Poland) Marek Paciorkowski | (Poland) Marek Paciorkowski | (Poland) Kamil Heller | 9 |
| Ford Fiesta Rally3 | (France) Laurent Pellier | (France) Laurent Pellier | (France) Marine Pelamourgues | 2, 4 |
| Ford Fiesta Rally3 | (France) Laurent Pellier | (France) Laurent Pellier | (France) Kévin Bronner | 6, 8, 10 |
| Ford Fiesta Rally3 | (Belgium) RACB National Team | (Belgium) Tom Rensonnet | (Belgium) Loïc Dumont | 2, 4, 6, 8, 10 |
| Ford Fiesta Rally3 | (Croatia) Martin Ravenščak | (Croatia) Martin Ravenščak | (Croatia) Dora Ravenščak | 4, 12 |
| Ford Fiesta Rally3 | (Germany) Fabio Schwarz | (Germany) Fabio Schwarz | (Austria) Bernhard Ettel | 12 |
| Ford Fiesta Rally3 | (Finland) Henri Timonen | (Finland) Henri Timonen | (Finland) Jussi Kärpijoki | 9 |
| Ford Fiesta Rally3 | (Turkey) Ali Türkkan | (Turkey) Ali Türkkan | (Turkey) Burak Erdener | 6, 8–10 |
| Ford Fiesta Rally3 | (Finland) Tuomas Vihtari | (Finland) Tuomas Vihtari | (Finland) Ville Harvia | 9 |
| Ford Fiesta Rally3 | (Kenya) Jeremiah Wahome | (Kenya) Jeremiah Wahome | (Kenya) Victor Okundi | 7 |
| Renault Clio Rally3 | (Greece) Efthimios Halkias | (Greece) Efthimios Halkias | (Greece) Nikos Komnos | 10 |

== Results and standings ==
=== Season summary ===
| Round | Event | Winning driver | Winning co-driver | Winning entrant | Winning time | Report | Ref. |
|---|---|---|---|---|---|---|---|
| 1 | (Monaco) Rallye Automobile Monte Carlo | No WRC3 entries | | | | Report | |
| 2 | Rally Sweden | (Finland) Roope Korhonen | (Finland) Anssi Viinikka | (Finland) Roope Korhonen | 2:44:25.9 | Report | |
| 3 | (Mexico) Rally Guanajuato México | (Paraguay) Diego Dominguez Jr. | (Spain) Rogelio Peñate | (Paraguay) Diego Dominguez Jr. | 3:46:34.2 | Report | |
| 4 | Croatia Rally | (Republic of Ireland) Eamonn Kelly | (Republic of Ireland) Conor Mohan | (Republic of Ireland) Motorsport Ireland Rally Academy | 3:20:15.7 | Report | |
| 5 | Rally de Portugal | (Finland) Roope Korhonen | (Finland) Anssi Viinikka | (Finland) Roope Korhonen | 4:11:51.5 | Report | |
| 6 | (Italy) Rally Italia Sardegna | (Finland) Roope Korhonen | (Finland) Anssi Viinikka | (Finland) Roope Korhonen | 4:14:20.0 | Report | |
| 7 | Safari Rally Kenya | (Paraguay) Diego Dominguez Jr. | (Spain) Rogelio Peñate | (Paraguay) Diego Dominguez Jr. | 4:37:57.1 | Report | |
| 8 | Rally Estonia | (Finland) Roope Korhonen | (Finland) Anssi Viinikka | (Finland) Roope Korhonen | 2:57:16.2 | Report | |
| 9 | Rally Finland | (Finland) Benjamin Korhola | (Finland) Pekka Kelander | (Finland) Benjamin Korhola | 2:54:27.0 | Report | |
| 10 | Acropolis Rally Greece | (Paraguay) Diego Dominguez Jr. | (Spain) Rogelio Peñate | (Paraguay) Diego Dominguez Jr. | 3:24:38.9 | Report | |
| 11 | Rally Chile | (Peru) Eduardo Castro | (Argentina) Fernando Mussano | (Peru) Eduardo Castro | 3:36:41.7 | Report | |
| 12 | (Europe) Central European Rally | (Czech Republic) Filip Kohn | (United Kingdom) Tom Woodburn | (Czech Republic) Filip Kohn | 3:23:04.4 | Report | |
| 13 | Rally Japan | (Canada) Jason Bailey | (Canada) Shayne Peterson | (Canada) Jason Bailey | 5:03:05.7 | Report | |

=== Scoring system ===
| Position | 1st | 2nd | 3rd | 4th | 5th | 6th | 7th | 8th | 9th | 10th |
| Points | 25 | 18 | 15 | 12 | 10 | 8 | 6 | 4 | 2 | 1 |

=== FIA WRC3 Championship for Drivers ===
| Pos. | Driver | MON (Monaco) | SWE (Sweden) | MEX (Mexico) | CRO (Croatia) | POR (Portugal) | ITA (Italy) | KEN (Kenya) | EST (Estonia) | FIN (Finland) | GRE (Greece) | CHL (Chile) | EUR (Europe) | JPN (Japan) | Points |
|---|---|---|---|---|---|---|---|---|---|---|---|---|---|---|---|
| 1 | (Finland) Roope Korhonen | | 1 | | | 1 | 1 | | 1 | | | | | | 100 |
| 2 | (Paraguay) Diego Domínguez Jr. | | 4 | 1 | | | NC | 1 | NC | | 1 | Ret | | | 87 |
| 3 | (Canada) Jason Bailey | | | 2 | | | | 2 | | | | | | 1 | 61 |
| 4 | (Belgium) Tom Rensonnet | | 5 | | 2 | | 6 | | 8 | | 3 | | | | 55 |
| 5 | (Czech Republic) Filip Kohn | | 9 | | 6 | | 9 | | NC | 3 | | | 1 | | 52 |
| 6 | (Republic of Ireland) William Creighton | | 2 | | 5 | | 2 | | 10 | | 8 | | | | 51 |
| 7 | (Republic of Ireland) Eamonn Kelly | | Ret | | 1 | | 7 | | Ret | | 2 | | | | 49 |
| 8 | (Spain) Roberto Blach Núñez | | | | 3 | | 4 | | 5 | | 5 | | | | 47 |
| 9 | (France) Laurent Pellier | | 3 | | Ret | | 5 | | 2 | | 10 | | | | 44 |
| 10 | (Peru) Eduardo Castro | | | | | | | | | | 4 | 1 | | | 37 |
| 11 | (Finland) Toni Herranen | | 8 | | | 2 | | | 3 | DNS | | | | | 37 |
| 12 | (Kenya) Hamza Anwar | | 7 | | 4 | | 8 | Ret | 6 | | Ret | | | | 30 |
| 13 | (Finland) Benjamin Korhola | | | | | | | | 9 | 1 | | | | | 27 |
| 14 | (Turkey) Ali Türkkan | | | | | | 3 | | 4 | Ret | Ret | | | | 27 |
| 15 | (Finland) Jesse Kallio | | 6 | | | | | | | 2 | | | | | 26 |
| 16 | (Germany) Fabio Schwarz | | | | | | | | | | | | 2 | | 18 |
| 17 | (Croatia) Martin Ravenščak | | | | Ret | | | | | | | | 3 | | 15 |
| 18 | (Kenya) McRae Kimathi | | | | | | | 3 | | | | | | | 15 |
| 19 | (Republic of Ireland) Brendan Cumiskey | | | | | | | | 7 | 6 | | | | | 14 |
| 20 | (Finland) Henri Timonen | | | | | | | | | 4 | | | | | 12 |
| 21 | (Finland) Tuomas Vihtari | | | | | | | | | 5 | | | | | 10 |
| 22 | (Greece) Efthimios Halkias | | | | | | | | | | 6 | | | | 8 |
| 23 | (Finland) Ville Laakso | | | | | | | | | 7 | | | | | 6 |
| 24 | (Greece) Spiros Galerakis | | | | | | | | | | 7 | | | | 6 |
| 25 | (Kazakhstan) Petr Borodin | | | | | | | | | 8 | | | | | 4 |
| 26 | (Greece) Giorgos Delaportas | | | | | | | | | | 9 | | | | 2 |
| Pos. | Driver | MON (Monaco) | SWE (Sweden) | MEX (Mexico) | CRO (Croatia) | POR (Portugal) | ITA (Italy) | KEN (Kenya) | EST (Estonia) | FIN (Finland) | GRE (Greece) | CHL (Chile) | EUR (Europe) | JPN (Japan) | Points |

Key
| Colour | Result |
|---|---|
| Gold | Winner |
| Silver | 2nd place |
| Bronze | 3rd place |
| Green | Points finish |
| Blue | Non-points finish |
| Blue | Non-classified finish (NC) |
| Purple | Did not finish (Ret) |
| Black | Excluded (EX) |
| Black | Disqualified (DSQ) |
| White | Did not start (DNS) |
| White | Cancelled (C) |
| Blank | Withdrew entry from the event (WD) |

=== FIA WRC3 Championship for Co-Drivers ===
| Pos. | Driver | MON (Monaco) | SWE (Sweden) | MEX (Mexico) | CRO (Croatia) | POR (Portugal) | ITA (Italy) | KEN (Kenya) | EST (Estonia) | FIN (Finland) | GRE (Greece) | CHL (Chile) | EUR (Europe) | JPN (Japan) | Points |
|---|---|---|---|---|---|---|---|---|---|---|---|---|---|---|---|
| 1 | (Finland) Anssi Viinikka | | 1 | | | 1 | 1 | | 1 | | | | | | 100 |
| 2 | (Spain) Rogelio Peñate | | 4 | 1 | | | NC | 1 | NC | | 1 | Ret | | | 87 |
| 3 | (Belgium) Loïc Dumont | | 5 | | 2 | | 6 | | 8 | | 3 | | | | 55 |
| 4 | (Republic of Ireland) Liam Regan | | 2 | | 5 | | 2 | | 10 | | 8 | | | | 51 |
| 5 | (Republic of Ireland) Conor Mohan | | Ret | | 1 | | 7 | | Ret | | 2 | | | | 49 |
| 6 | (Spain) Mauro Barreiro | | | | 3 | | 4 | | 5 | | 5 | | | | 47 |
| 7 | (Canada) Shayne Peterson | | | 2 | | | | | | | | | | 1 | 43 |
| 8 | (United Kingdom) Tom Woodburn | | | | | | 9 | | NC | 3 | | | 1 | | 42 |
| 9 | (Finland) Mikko Lukka | | 8 | | | 2 | | | 3 | DNS | | | | | 37 |
| 10 | (France) Kévin Bronner | | | | | | 5 | | 2 | | 10 | | | | 29 |
| 11 | (Finland) Pekka Kelander | | | | | | | | 9 | 1 | | | | | 27 |
| 12 | (Turkey) Burak Erdener | | | | | | 3 | | 4 | Ret | Ret | | | | 27 |
| 13 | (Finland) Jussi Lindberg | | 6 | | | | | | | 2 | | | | | 26 |
| 14 | (Argentina) Fernando Mussano | | | | | | | | | | | 1 | | | 25 |
| 15 | (Canada) Jamie Willetts | | | | | | | 2 | | | | | | | 18 |
| 16 | (Austria) Bernhard Ettel | | | | | | | | | | | | 2 | | 18 |
| 17 | (France) Marine Pelamourgues | | 3 | | Ret | | | | | | | | | | 15 |
| 18 | (Croatia) Dora Ravenščak | | | | Ret | | | | | | | | 3 | | 15 |
| 19 | (Kenya) Mwangi Kioni | | | | | | | 3 | | | | | | | 15 |
| 20 | (Republic of Ireland) Martin Brady | | | | 4 | | | | | | | | | | 12 |
| 21 | (Finland) Jussi Kärpijoki | | | | | | | | | 4 | | | | | 12 |
| 22 | (Spain) Carla Salvat Trías | | | | | | | | | | 4 | | | | 12 |
| 23 | (Finland) Ville Harvia | | | | | | | | | 5 | | | | | 10 |
| 24 | (Czech Republic) Tomáš Střeska | | 9 | | 6 | | | | | | | | | | 10 |
| 25 | (Kenya) Adnan Din | | 7 | | | | 8 | Ret | | | | | | | 10 |
| 26 | (United States) Alexander Kihurani | | | | | | | | 6 | | | | | | 8 |
| 27 | (Republic of Ireland) Martin Connolly | | | | | | | | | 6 | | | | | 8 |
| 28 | (Greece) Nikos Komnos | | | | | | | | | | 6 | | | | 8 |
| 29 | (Republic of Ireland) Arthur Kierans | | | | | | | | 7 | | | | | | 6 |
| 30 | (Finland) Jani Luhtaniemi | | | | | | | | | 7 | | | | | 6 |
| 31 | (Greece) Konstantinos Soukoulis | | | | | | | | | | 7 | | | | 6 |
| 32 | (Kazakhstan) Roman Cheprassov | | | | | | | | | 8 | | | | | 4 |
| 33 | (Greece) Evangelos Panaritis | | | | | | | | | | 9 | | | | 2 |
| Pos. | Driver | MON (Monaco) | SWE (Sweden) | MEX (Mexico) | CRO (Croatia) | POR (Portugal) | ITA (Italy) | KEN (Kenya) | EST (Estonia) | FIN (Finland) | GRE (Greece) | CHL (Chile) | EUR (Europe) | JPN (Japan) | Points |

Key
| Colour | Result |
|---|---|
| Gold | Winner |
| Silver | 2nd place |
| Bronze | 3rd place |
| Green | Points finish |
| Blue | Non-points finish |
| Blue | Non-classified finish (NC) |
| Purple | Did not finish (Ret) |
| Black | Excluded (EX) |
| Black | Disqualified (DSQ) |
| White | Did not start (DNS) |
| White | Cancelled (C) |
| Blank | Withdrew entry from the event (WD) |
