= 2023 Rally Mexico =

19th edition of Rally Mexico

2023 Rally Mexico Rally Guanajuato México 2023
Round 3 of 13 in the 2023 World Rally Championship
← Previous event	Next event →
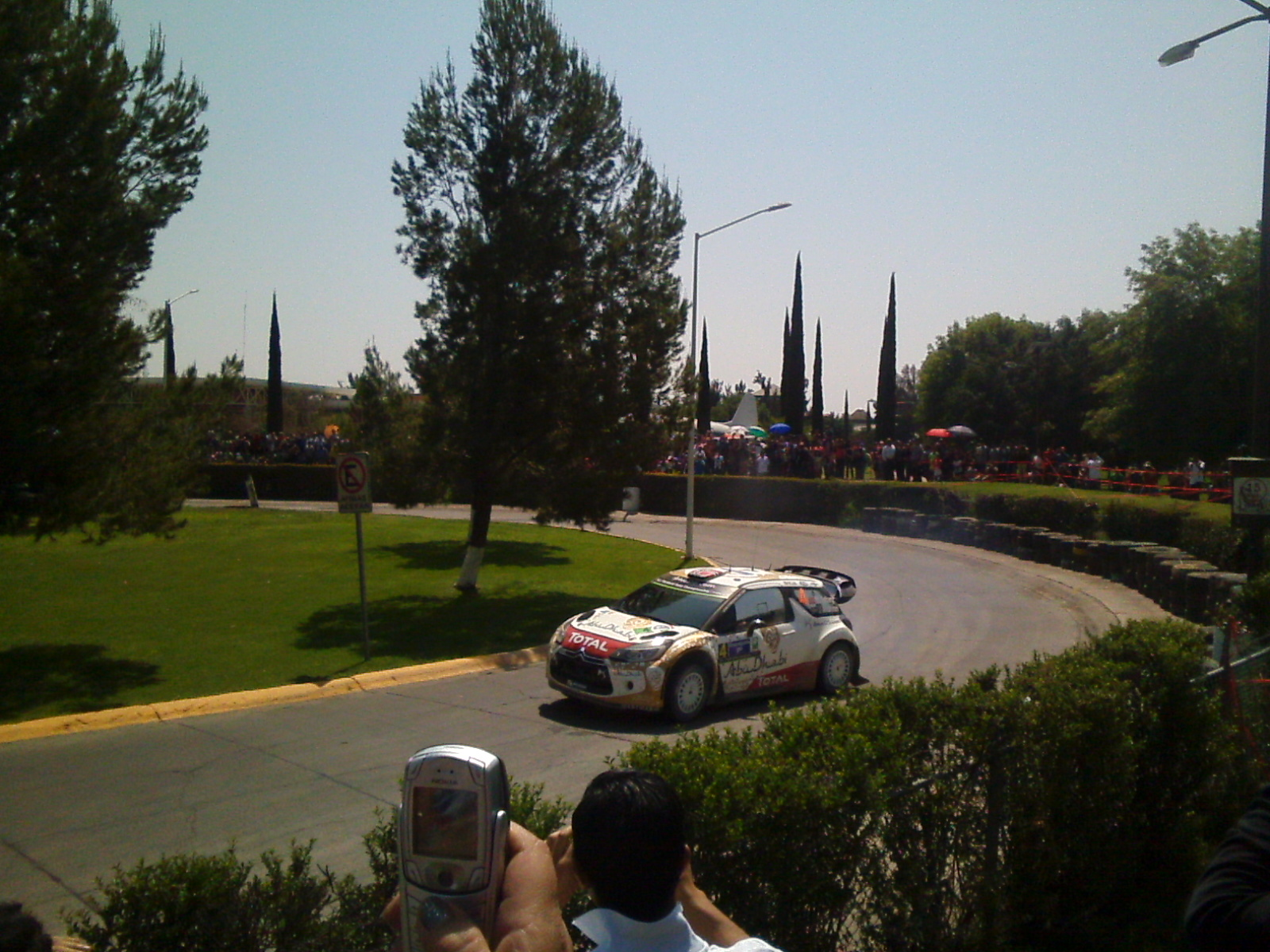
- The Rally Mexico returned to the championship after a two-year absence.
- Host country: Mexico
- Rally base: León, Guanajuato
- Dates run: 16 – 19 March 2023
- Start location: City of Guanajuato, Guanajuato
- Finish location: León, Guanajuato
- Stages: 23 (315.69 km; 196.16 miles)
- Stage surface: Gravel
- Transport distance: 653.93 km (406.33 miles)
- Overall distance: 969.62 km (602.49 miles)

Statistics
- Crews registered: 32
- Crews: 31 at start, 28 at finish
- Cancellation: SS15 cancelled due to the accident of Esapekka Lappi and Janne Ferm in the stage at the morning loop.

Overall results
- Overall winner: (France) Sébastien Ogier (France) Vincent Landais (Japan) Toyota Gazoo Racing WRT; 3:16:09.4
- Power Stage winner: (France) Sébastien Ogier (France) Vincent Landais (Japan) Toyota Gazoo Racing WRT; 5:14.8

Support category results
- WRC-2 winner: (United Kingdom) Gus Greensmith (Sweden) Jonas Andersson; 3:28:40.9
- WRC-3 winner: (Paraguay) Diego Dominguez Jr. (Spain) Rogelio Peñate; 3:46:34.2

The 2023 Rally Mexico (also known as the Rally Guanajuato México 2023) was a motor racing event for rally cars held over four days between 16 and 19 March 2023. It marked the nineteenth running of the Rally Mexico, and was the third round of the 2023 World Rally Championship, World Rally Championship-2 and World Rally Championship-3. The 2023 event was based in the city of León in Guanajuato and was consisted of twenty-three special stages, covering a total competitive distance of 315.69 km (196.16 mi).

Sébastien Ogier and Julien Ingrassia were the defending rally winners. However, Ingrassia did not defend his title as he retired from the sport at the end of 2021 season. Pontus Tidemand and Patrick Barth were the defending rally winners in the WRC-2 category. Marco Bulacia Wilkinson and Giovanni Bernacchini were the defending rally winners in the WRC-3 category.

Ogier and Vincent Landais won their second victory of the season. Their team, Toyota Gazoo Racing WRT, were the manufacturers' winners. Gus Greensmith and Jonas Andersson and Patrick Barth were the winners in the WRC-2 category, while Diego Dominguez Jr. and Rogelio Peñate were the winners in the WRC-3 category.

== Background ==
=== Entry list ===
The following crews were entered into the rally. The event was open to crews competing in the World Rally Championship, its support categories, the World Rally Championship-2, World Rally Championship-3 and privateer entries that were not registered to score points in any championship. Ten were entered under Rally1 regulations, as were ten Rally2 crews in the World Rally Championship-2 and one Rally3 crew in the World Rally Championship-3.

Rally1 entries competing in the World Rally Championship
No.	Driver	Co-Driver	Entrant	Car	Championship eligibility	Tyre
4	(Finland) Esapekka Lappi	(Finland) Janne Ferm	(South Korea) Hyundai Shell Mobis WRT	Hyundai i20 N Rally1	Driver, Co-driver, Manufacturer	P
6	(Spain) Dani Sordo	(Spain) Cándido Carrera	(South Korea) Hyundai Shell Mobis WRT	Hyundai i20 N Rally1	Driver, Co-driver, Manufacturer	P
7	(France) Pierre-Louis Loubet	(Belgium) Nicolas Gilsoul	(United Kingdom) M-Sport Ford WRT	Ford Puma Rally1	Driver, Co-driver, Manufacturer	P
8	(Estonia) Ott Tänak	(Estonia) Martin Järveoja	(United Kingdom) M-Sport Ford WRT	Ford Puma Rally1	Driver, Co-driver, Manufacturer	P
9	(Greece) Jourdan Serderidis	(Belgium) Frédéric Miclotte	(United Kingdom) M-Sport Ford WRT	Ford Puma Rally1	Driver, Co-driver	P
11	(Belgium) Thierry Neuville	(Belgium) Martijn Wydaeghe	(South Korea) Hyundai Shell Mobis WRT	Hyundai i20 N Rally1	Driver, Co-driver, Manufacturer	P
17	(France) Sébastien Ogier	(France) Vincent Landais	(Japan) Toyota Gazoo Racing WRT	Toyota GR Yaris Rally1	Driver, Co-driver, Manufacturer	P
18	(Japan) Takamoto Katsuta	(Republic of Ireland) Aaron Johnston	(Japan) Toyota Gazoo Racing WRT	Toyota GR Yaris Rally1	Driver, Co-driver	P
33	(United Kingdom) Elfyn Evans	(United Kingdom) Scott Martin	(Japan) Toyota Gazoo Racing WRT	Toyota GR Yaris Rally1	Driver, Co-driver, Manufacturer	P
69	(Finland) Kalle Rovanperä	(Finland) Jonne Halttunen	(Japan) Toyota Gazoo Racing WRT	Toyota GR Yaris Rally1	Driver, Co-driver, Manufacturer	P

Rally2 entries competing in the World Rally Championship-2
No.	Driver	Co-Driver	Entrant	Car	Championship eligibility	Tyre
20	(United Kingdom) Gus Greensmith	(Sweden) Jonas Andersson	(United Kingdom) Gus Greensmith	Škoda Fabia RS Rally2	Driver, Co-driver	P
21	(Sweden) Oliver Solberg	(United Kingdom) Elliott Edmondson	(Sweden) Oliver Solberg	Škoda Fabia RS Rally2	Driver, Co-driver	P
22	(France) Adrien Fourmaux	(France) Alexandre Coria	(United Kingdom) M-Sport Ford WRT	Ford Fiesta Rally2	Driver, Co-driver	P
23	Nikolay Gryazin (Note: Nikolay Gryazin is Russian, but he competes as a neutral competitor using the ANA flag as Russian national emblems were banned by the association due to the Russian invasion of Ukraine.)	Konstantin Aleksandrov (Note: Konstantin Aleksandrov is Russian, but he competes as a neutral competitor using the ANA flag as Russian national emblems were banned by the association due to the Russian invasion of Ukraine.)	(Germany) Toksport WRT 2	Škoda Fabia Rally2 evo	Team	P
24	(Finland) Emil Lindholm	(Finland) Reeta Hämäläinen	(Germany) Toksport WRT 2	Škoda Fabia Rally2 evo	Driver, Co-driver, Team	P
25	(Poland) Kajetan Kajetanowicz	(Poland) Maciej Szczepaniak	(Poland) Kajetan Kajetanowicz	Škoda Fabia Rally2 evo	Challenger Driver, Challenger Co-driver	P
26	(Czech Republic) Martin Prokop	(Czech Republic) Michal Ernst	(Czech Republic) Martin Prokop	Ford Fiesta Rally2	Challenger Driver, Challenger Co-driver	P
27	(Poland) Daniel Chwist	(Poland) Kamil Heller	(Poland) Daniel Chwist	Škoda Fabia Rally2 evo	Challenger Driver, Challenger Co-driver	P
28	(Peru) Eduardo Castro	(Argentina) Fernando Mussano	(Peru) Eduardo Castro	Škoda Fabia Rally2 evo	Challenger Driver, Challenger Co-driver	P
29	(Chile) Jorge Martínez Fontena	(Argentina) Alberto Alvarez Nicholson	(Chile) Jorge Martínez Fontena	Škoda Fabia R5	Challenger Driver, Challenger Co-driver	P

Rally3 entries competing in the World Rally Championship-3
No.	Driver	Co-Driver	Entrant	Car	Tyre
30	(Paraguay) Diego Dominguez Jr.	(Spain) Rogelio Peñate	(Paraguay) Diego Dominguez Jr.	Ford Fiesta Rally3	P
37	(Canada) Jason Bailey	(Canada) Shayne Peterson	(Canada) Jason Bailey	Ford Fiesta Rally3	P

=== Itinerary ===
All dates and times are CST (UTC-6).

Date	No.	Time span	Stage name	Distance
16 March	—N/a	After 10:01	Llano Grande [Shakedown]	5.52 km
16 March		After 17:40	Opening ceremony, León	—N/a
16 March	SS1	After 20:05	Street Stage GTO 1	1.12 km
16 March	SS2	After 20:28	Street Stage GTO 2	1.12 km
17 March		7:30 – 7:45	Service A, León	—N/a
17 March	SS3	After 8:43	El Chocolate 1	29.07 km
17 March	SS4	After 9:46	Ortega 1	15.71 km
17 March	SS5	After 10:39	Las Minas 1	13.79 km
17 March		12:49 – 13:19	Flexi service B, León	—N/a
17 March	SS6	After 14:17	El Chocolate 2	29.07 km
17 March	SS7	After 15:20	Ortega 2	15.71 km
17 March	SS8	After 16:13	Las Minas 2	13.79 km
17 March	SS9	After 17:16	Las Dunas Superspecial 1	3.70 km
17 March	SS10	After 18:16	Distrito León Mx SSS	2.73 km
17 March		21:00 – 21:45	Flexi service C, León	—N/a
18 March	SS11	After 8:13	Ibarrilla 1	14.82 km
18 March	SS12	After 9:04	El Mosquito 1	22.56 km
18 March	SS13	After 10:05	Derramadero 1	21.70 km
18 March	SS14	After 11:13	Las Dunas Superspecial 2	3.70 km
18 March		12:33 – 13:03	Flexi service D, León	—N/a
18 March	SS15	After 14:06	Ibarrilla 2	14.82 km
18 March	SS16	After 14:59	El Mosquito 2	22.56 km
18 March	SS17	After 16:05	Derramadero 2	21.70 km
18 March	SS18	After 17:18	Las Dunas Superspecial 3	3.70 km
18 March	SS19	After 18:08	Rock & Rally SSS	2.73 km
18 March		21:00 – 21:45	Flexi service E, León	—N/a
19 March	SS20	After 8:05	Las Dunas Superspecial 4	3.70 km
19 March	SS21	After 9:16	Otates	35.63 km
19 March	SS22	After 10:24	San Diego	12.61 km
19 March	SS23	After 12:18	El Brinco [Power Stage]	9.59 km
19 March		13:33 – 13:43	Flexi service F, León	—N/a
19 March		After 14:30	Podium ceremony, León	—N/a

== Report ==
=== WRC Rally1 ===
Rally Mexico opened with 2 runs around a superspecial stage in Guanajuato City, and it was Ott Tänak and Martin Järveoja who was fastest on both runs, taking a 1.7 second lead over Kalle Rovanpera and Jonne Halttunen into Friday. However, on the first stage of the day, the 29-kilometer El Chocolate stage, the Estonian crew's turbo failed, causing them to drop to twenty-ninth place and almost 8 minutes behind the leaders, Esapekka Lappi and Janne Ferm. Lappi and Ferm would lead the rally at the end of Friday by 5.3 seconds, ahead of 8-time World Champion Sébastien Ogier and his co-driver Vincent Landais.

The rally leaders had a serious accident on the opening stage of Saturday, their Hyundai i20 going rear first into a telegraph pole. The car then caught fire, causing the stage to be red-flagged. Thierry Neuville and Martin Wydaeghe won the following 3 stages, whilst Ogier and Landais had a 29 second lead over Toyota teammates Elfyn Evans and Scott Martin. Ogier would extend his lead to 36 seconds, as his teammates Evans and Martin's gap to third place Neuville and Wydaeghe was reduced to 4.3 seconcds.

Evans and Martin were locked in a battle with Neuville and Wydaeghe for second place, the Belgians closing the gap to 2.7 seconds as they began the Power Stage, a suspected bent suspension arm costing Evans and Martin on the penultimate stage. In Power Stage, Neuville and Wydaeghe gained 3.1 seconds on Evans and Martin to claim second place by 4 tenths of a second. Ogier and Landais won the rally by 27.5 seconds and also won the Power Stage by 2.1 seconds, meaning they led the championship by 3 points over Neuville and Wydaeghe.

==== Classification ====
Position		No.	Driver	Co-driver	Entrant	Car	Time	Difference	Points	
Event	Class	No.	Driver	Co-driver	Entrant	Car	Time	Difference	Event	Stage
1	1	17	Sébastien Ogier	Vincent Landais	Toyota Gazoo Racing WRT	Toyota GR Yaris Rally1	3:16:09.4	0.0	25	5
2	2	11	Thierry Neuville	Martijn Wydaeghe	Hyundai Shell Mobis WRT	Hyundai i20 N Rally1	3:16:36.9	+27.5	18	3
3	3	33	Elfyn Evans	Scott Martin	Toyota Gazoo Racing WRT	Toyota GR Yaris Rally1	3:16:37.3	+27.9	15	0
4	4	69	Kalle Rovanperä	Jonne Halttunen	Toyota Gazoo Racing WRT	Toyota GR Yaris Rally1	3:18:04.7	+1:55.3	12	2
5	5	6	Dani Sordo	Cándido Carrera	Hyundai Shell Mobis WRT	Hyundai i20 N Rally1	3:19:08.2	+2:58.8	10	1
9	6	8	Ott Tänak	Martin Järveoja	M-Sport Ford WRT	Ford Puma Rally1	3:31:29.0	+15:19.6	2	4
23	7	18	Takamoto Katsuta	Aaron Johnston	Toyota Gazoo Racing WRT	Toyota GR Yaris Rally1	4:20:43.9	+1:04:34.5	0	0
25	8	9	Jourdan Serderidis	Frédéric Miclotte	M-Sport Ford WRT	Ford Puma Rally1	4:51:05.0	+1:34:55.6	0	0
27	9	7	Pierre-Louis Loubet	Nicolas Gilsoul	M-Sport Ford WRT	Ford Puma Rally1	5:10:11.4	+1:54:02.0	0	0
Retired SS11		4	Esapekka Lappi	Janne Ferm	Hyundai Shell Mobis WRT	Hyundai i20 N Rally1	Accident		0	0

==== Special stages ====
Stage	Winners	Car	Time	Class leaders
SD	Rovanperä / Halttunen; Lappi / Ferm	Toyota GR Yaris Rally1; Hyundai i20 N Rally1	3:44.4	—N/a
SS1	Tänak / Järveoja	Ford Puma Rally1	58.0	Tänak / Järveoja
SS2	Tänak / Järveoja	Ford Puma Rally1	56.2	Tänak / Järveoja
SS3	Lappi / Ferm	Hyundai i20 N Rally1	22:00.2	Lappi / Ferm
SS4	Ogier / Landais	Toyota GR Yaris Rally1	8:27.8	Lappi / Ferm
SS5	Lappi / Ferm	Hyundai i20 N Rally1	8:55.6	Lappi / Ferm
SS6	Lappi / Ferm	Hyundai i20 N Rally1	21:54.1	Lappi / Ferm
SS7	Ogier / Landais	Toyota GR Yaris Rally1	8:20.8	Lappi / Ferm
SS8	Lappi / Ferm	Hyundai i20 N Rally1	8:47.7	Lappi / Ferm
SS9	Lappi / Ferm	Hyundai i20 N Rally1	3:15.0	Lappi / Ferm
SS10	Sordo / Carrera	Hyundai i20 N Rally1	1:29.9	Lappi / Ferm
SS11	Ogier / Landais	Toyota GR Yaris Rally1	8:35.6	Ogier / Landais
SS12	Neuville / Wydaeghe	Hyundai i20 N Rally1	14:38.1	Ogier / Landais
SS13	Neuville / Wydaeghe	Hyundai i20 N Rally1	12:23.1	Ogier / Landais
SS14	Neuville / Wydaeghe	Hyundai i20 N Rally1	3:11.4	Ogier / Landais
SS15	Stage cancelled			
SS16	Ogier / Landais	Toyota GR Yaris Rally1	14:24.8	Ogier / Landais
SS17	Neuville / Wydaeghe	Hyundai i20 N Rally1	12:16.0	Ogier / Landais
SS18	Tänak / Järveoja	Ford Puma Rally1	3:13.6	Ogier / Landais
SS19	Tänak / Järveoja	Ford Puma Rally1	1:29.6	Ogier / Landais
SS20	Neuville / Wydaeghe	Hyundai i20 N Rally1	3:10.9	Ogier / Landais
SS21	Evans / Martin	Toyota GR Yaris Rally1	24:37.7	Ogier / Landais
SS22	Neuville / Wydaeghe	Hyundai i20 N Rally1	7:11.8	Ogier / Landais
SS23	Ogier / Landais	Toyota GR Yaris Rally1	5:14.8	Ogier / Landais

==== Championship standings ====
Pos.	Drivers' championships			Co-drivers' championships			Manufacturers' championships		
Pos.	Move	Driver	Points	Move	Co-driver	Points	Move	Manufacturer	Points
1	4	Sébastien Ogier	56	4	Vincent Landais	56		Toyota Gazoo Racing WRT	127
2	1	Thierry Neuville	53	1	Martijn Wydaeghe	53		Hyundai Shell Mobis WRT	100
3	1	Kalle Rovanperä	52	1	Jonne Halttunen	52		M-Sport Ford WRT	73
4	3	Ott Tänak	47	3	Martin Järveoja	47			
5	1	Elfyn Evans	44	1	Scott Martin	44			

=== WRC-2 Rally2 ===
==== Classification ====
Position		No.	Driver	Co-driver	Entrant	Car	Time	Difference	Points		
Event	Class	No.	Driver	Co-driver	Entrant	Car	Time	Difference	Class	Stage	Event
6	1	20	Gus Greensmith	Jonas Andersson	Gus Greensmith	Škoda Fabia RS Rally2	3:28:40.9	0.0	25	1	8
7	2	24	Emil Lindholm	Reeta Hämäläinen	Toksport WRT 2	Škoda Fabia Rally2 evo	3:29:13.8	+32.9	18	2	6
8	3	21	Oliver Solberg	Elliott Edmondson	Oliver Solberg	Škoda Fabia RS Rally2	3:29:47.1	+1:06.2	15	0	4
10	4	25	Kajetan Kajetanowicz	Maciej Szczepaniak	Kajetan Kajetanowicz	Škoda Fabia Rally2 evo	3:32:06.0	+3:25.1	12	0	1
11	5	26	Martin Prokop	Michal Ernst	Martin Prokop	Ford Fiesta Rally2	3:35:05.5	+6:24.6	10	0	0
14	6	29	Jorge Martínez Fontena	Alberto Alvarez Nicholson	Jorge Martínez Fontena	Škoda Fabia R5	3:44:16.3	+15:35.4	8	0	0
16	7	22	Adrien Fourmaux	Alexandre Coria	M-Sport Ford WRT	Ford Fiesta Rally2	3:47:02.5	+18:21.6	6	3	0
18	8	27	Daniel Chwist	Kamil Heller	Daniel Chwist	Škoda Fabia Rally2 evo	3:52:27.1	+23:46.2	4	0	0
21	9	28	Eduardo Castro	Fernando Mussano	Eduardo Castro	Škoda Fabia Rally2 evo	4:09:38.9	+40:58.0	2	0	0
Retired SS4		24	Nikolay Gryazin	Konstantin Aleksandrov	Toksport WRT 2	Škoda Fabia Rally2 evo	Rolled		0	0	0

==== Special stages ====
Overall
Stage	Winners	Car	Time	Class leaders
SD	Greensmith / Andersson	Škoda Fabia RS Rally2	3:58.4	—N/a
SS1	Lindholm / Hämäläinen	Škoda Fabia Rally2 evo	1:00.8	Lindholm / Hämäläinen
SS2	Lindholm / Hämäläinen	Škoda Fabia Rally2 evo	59.5	Lindholm / Hämäläinen
SS3	Stage interrupted			
SS4	Lindholm / Hämäläinen	Škoda Fabia Rally2 evo	8:57.0	Lindholm / Hämäläinen
SS5	Solberg / Edmondson	Škoda Fabia RS Rally2	9:16.4	Lindholm / Hämäläinen
SS6	Greensmith / Andersson	Škoda Fabia RS Rally2	22:46.1	Greensmith / Andersson
SS7	Solberg / Edmondson	Škoda Fabia RS Rally2	8:46.6	Greensmith / Andersson
SS8	Greensmith / Andersson	Škoda Fabia RS Rally2	9:08.3	Greensmith / Andersson
SS9	Solberg / Edmondson	Škoda Fabia RS Rally2	3:17.9	Greensmith / Andersson
SS10	Solberg / Edmondson	Škoda Fabia RS Rally2	1:32.5	Greensmith / Andersson
SS11	Stage interrupted			
SS12	Stage interrupted			
SS13	Stage interrupted			
SS14	Solberg / Edmondson	Škoda Fabia RS Rally2	3:11.9	Greensmith / Andersson
SS15	Stage cancelled			
SS16	Solberg / Edmondson	Škoda Fabia RS Rally2	15:11.7	Greensmith / Andersson
SS17	Solberg / Edmondson	Škoda Fabia RS Rally2	12:52.2	Greensmith / Andersson
SS18	Solberg / Edmondson	Škoda Fabia RS Rally2	3:14.0	Greensmith / Andersson
SS19	Solberg / Edmondson; Fourmaux / Coria	Škoda Fabia RS Rally2; Ford Fiesta Rally2	1:32.8	Greensmith / Andersson
SS20	Lindholm / Hämäläinen	Škoda Fabia Rally2 evo	3:13.9	Greensmith / Andersson
SS21	Solberg / Edmondson	Škoda Fabia RS Rally2	25:24.2	Greensmith / Andersson
SS22	Lindholm / Hämäläinen	Škoda Fabia Rally2 evo	7:36.8	Greensmith / Andersson
SS23	Fourmaux / Coria	Ford Fiesta Rally2	5:40.4	Greensmith / Andersson

Challenger
Stage	Winners	Car	Time	Class leaders
SD	Martínez Fontena / Alvarez Nicholson	Škoda Fabia R5	4:07.7	—N/a
SS1	Kajetanowicz / Szczepaniak	Škoda Fabia Rally2 evo	1:01.8	Kajetanowicz / Szczepaniak
SS2	Kajetanowicz / Szczepaniak	Škoda Fabia Rally2 evo	1:01.1	Kajetanowicz / Szczepaniak
SS3	Stage interrupted			
SS4	Kajetanowicz / Szczepaniak	Škoda Fabia Rally2 evo	9:07.5	Kajetanowicz / Szczepaniak
SS5	Kajetanowicz / Szczepaniak	Škoda Fabia Rally2 evo	9:26.3	Kajetanowicz / Szczepaniak
SS6	Kajetanowicz / Szczepaniak	Škoda Fabia Rally2 evo	23:16.3	Kajetanowicz / Szczepaniak
SS7	Kajetanowicz / Szczepaniak	Škoda Fabia Rally2 evo	8:54.3	Kajetanowicz / Szczepaniak
SS8	Kajetanowicz / Szczepaniak	Škoda Fabia Rally2 evo	9:19.0	Kajetanowicz / Szczepaniak
SS9	Kajetanowicz / Szczepaniak	Škoda Fabia Rally2 evo	3:24.2	Kajetanowicz / Szczepaniak
SS10	Kajetanowicz / Szczepaniak	Škoda Fabia Rally2 evo	1:34.6	Kajetanowicz / Szczepaniak
SS11	Stage interrupted			
SS12	Stage interrupted			
SS13	Stage interrupted			
SS14	Kajetanowicz / Szczepaniak	Škoda Fabia Rally2 evo	3:19.7	Kajetanowicz / Szczepaniak
SS15	Stage cancelled			
SS16	Kajetanowicz / Szczepaniak	Škoda Fabia Rally2 evo	15:35.4	Kajetanowicz / Szczepaniak
SS17	Prokop / Ernst	Ford Fiesta Rally2	13:34.2	Kajetanowicz / Szczepaniak
SS18	Martínez Fontena / Alvarez Nicholson	Škoda Fabia R5	3:24.5	Kajetanowicz / Szczepaniak
SS19	Kajetanowicz / Szczepaniak	Škoda Fabia Rally2 evo	1:34.4	Kajetanowicz / Szczepaniak
SS20	Martínez Fontena / Alvarez Nicholson	Škoda Fabia R5	3:20.7	Kajetanowicz / Szczepaniak
SS21	Kajetanowicz / Szczepaniak	Škoda Fabia Rally2 evo	26:26.1	Kajetanowicz / Szczepaniak
SS22	Kajetanowicz / Szczepaniak	Škoda Fabia Rally2 evo	7:51.1	Kajetanowicz / Szczepaniak
SS23	Kajetanowicz / Szczepaniak	Škoda Fabia Rally2 evo	5:53.4	Kajetanowicz / Szczepaniak

==== Championship standings ====
Pos.	Open Drivers' championships			Open Co-drivers' championships			Teams' championships			Challenger Drivers' championships			Challenger Co-drivers' championships		
Pos.	Move	Driver	Points	Move	Co-driver	Points	Move	Manufacturer	Points	Move	Manufacturer	Points	Move	Driver	Points
1	1	Oliver Solberg	43	1	Elliott Edmondson	43		Toksport WRT 2	65		Nikolay Gryazin	25		Konstantin Aleksandrov	25
2	1	Yohan Rossel	28	1	Arnaud Dunand	28		Toksport WRT	40		Kajetan Kajetanowicz	25		Maciej Szczepaniak	25
3	10	Emil Lindholm	28	10	Reeta Hämäläinen	28		M-Sport Ford WRT	30	New entry	Sami Pajari	25	New entry	Enni Mälkönen	25
4	New entry	Gus Greensmith	26	New entry	Jonas Andersson	26		Hyundai Motorsport N	30	1	Marco Bulacia	25	1	Borja Rozada	18
5	2	Nikolay Gryazin	20	2	Konstantin Aleksandrov	20		Motorsport Ireland Rally Academy	18	1	Pepe López	18	1	James Morgan	18

=== WRC-3 Rally3 ===
==== Classification ====
Position		No.	Driver	Co-driver	Entrant	Car	Time	Difference	Points
Event	Class	No.	Driver	Co-driver	Entrant	Car	Time	Difference	Points
15	1	30	Diego Dominguez Jr.	Rogelio Peñate	Diego Dominguez Jr.	Ford Fiesta Rally3	3:46:34.2	0.0	25
20	2	37	Jason Bailey	Shayne Peterson	Jason Bailey	Ford Fiesta Rally3	4:05:59.9	+19:25.7	18

==== Special stages ====
Stage	Winners	Car	Time	Class leaders
SD	Dominguez Jr. / Peñate	Ford Fiesta Rally3	4:44.9	—N/a
SS1	Dominguez Jr. / Peñate	Ford Fiesta Rally3	1:06.7	Dominguez Jr. / Peñate
SS2	Dominguez Jr. / Peñate	Ford Fiesta Rally3	1:05.7	Dominguez Jr. / Peñate
SS3	Stage interrupted			
SS4	Dominguez Jr. / Peñate	Ford Fiesta Rally3	10:15.4	Dominguez Jr. / Peñate
SS5	Dominguez Jr. / Peñate	Ford Fiesta Rally3	10:30.7	Dominguez Jr. / Peñate
SS6	Dominguez Jr. / Peñate	Ford Fiesta Rally3	25:56.7	Dominguez Jr. / Peñate
SS7	Dominguez Jr. / Peñate	Ford Fiesta Rally3	10:04.6	Dominguez Jr. / Peñate
SS8	Dominguez Jr. / Peñate	Ford Fiesta Rally3	10:15.1	Dominguez Jr. / Peñate
SS9	Dominguez Jr. / Peñate	Ford Fiesta Rally3	3:36.1	Dominguez Jr. / Peñate
SS10	Dominguez Jr. / Peñate	Ford Fiesta Rally3	1:37.9	Dominguez Jr. / Peñate
SS11	Stage interrupted			
SS12	Stage interrupted			
SS13	Stage interrupted			
SS14	Dominguez Jr. / Peñate	Ford Fiesta Rally3	3:30.6	Dominguez Jr. / Peñate
SS15	Stage cancelled			
SS16	Dominguez Jr. / Peñate	Ford Fiesta Rally3	17:06.2	Dominguez Jr. / Peñate
SS17	Dominguez Jr. / Peñate	Ford Fiesta Rally3	14:51.8	Dominguez Jr. / Peñate
SS18	Dominguez Jr. / Peñate	Ford Fiesta Rally3	3:36.1	Dominguez Jr. / Peñate
SS19	Dominguez Jr. / Peñate	Ford Fiesta Rally3	1:38.8	Dominguez Jr. / Peñate
SS20	Dominguez Jr. / Peñate	Ford Fiesta Rally3	3:35.7	Dominguez Jr. / Peñate
SS21	Dominguez Jr. / Peñate	Ford Fiesta Rally3	28:54.7	Dominguez Jr. / Peñate
SS22	Dominguez Jr. / Peñate	Ford Fiesta Rally3	8:39.8	Dominguez Jr. / Peñate
SS23	Dominguez Jr. / Peñate	Ford Fiesta Rally3	6:27.7	Dominguez Jr. / Peñate

==== Championship standings ====
Pos.	Drivers' championships			Co-drivers' championships		
Pos.	Move	Driver	Points	Move	Co-driver	Points
1	3	Diego Dominguez Jr.	37	3	Rogelio Peñate	37
2	1	Roope Korhonen	25	1	Anssi Viinikka	25
3	1	William Creighton	18	1	Liam Regan	18
4	New entry	Jason Bailey	18	New entry	Shayne Peterson	18
5	2	Laurent Pellier	15	2	Marine Pelamourgues	15

== Notes ==
Previous rally: 2023 Rally Sweden	2023 FIA World Rally Championship	Next rally: 2023 Croatia Rally
Previous rally: 2020 Rally Mexico	2023 Rally Mexico	Next rally: 2024 Rally Mexico
