= Maciej Szczepaniak =

Polish rally driver and co-driver

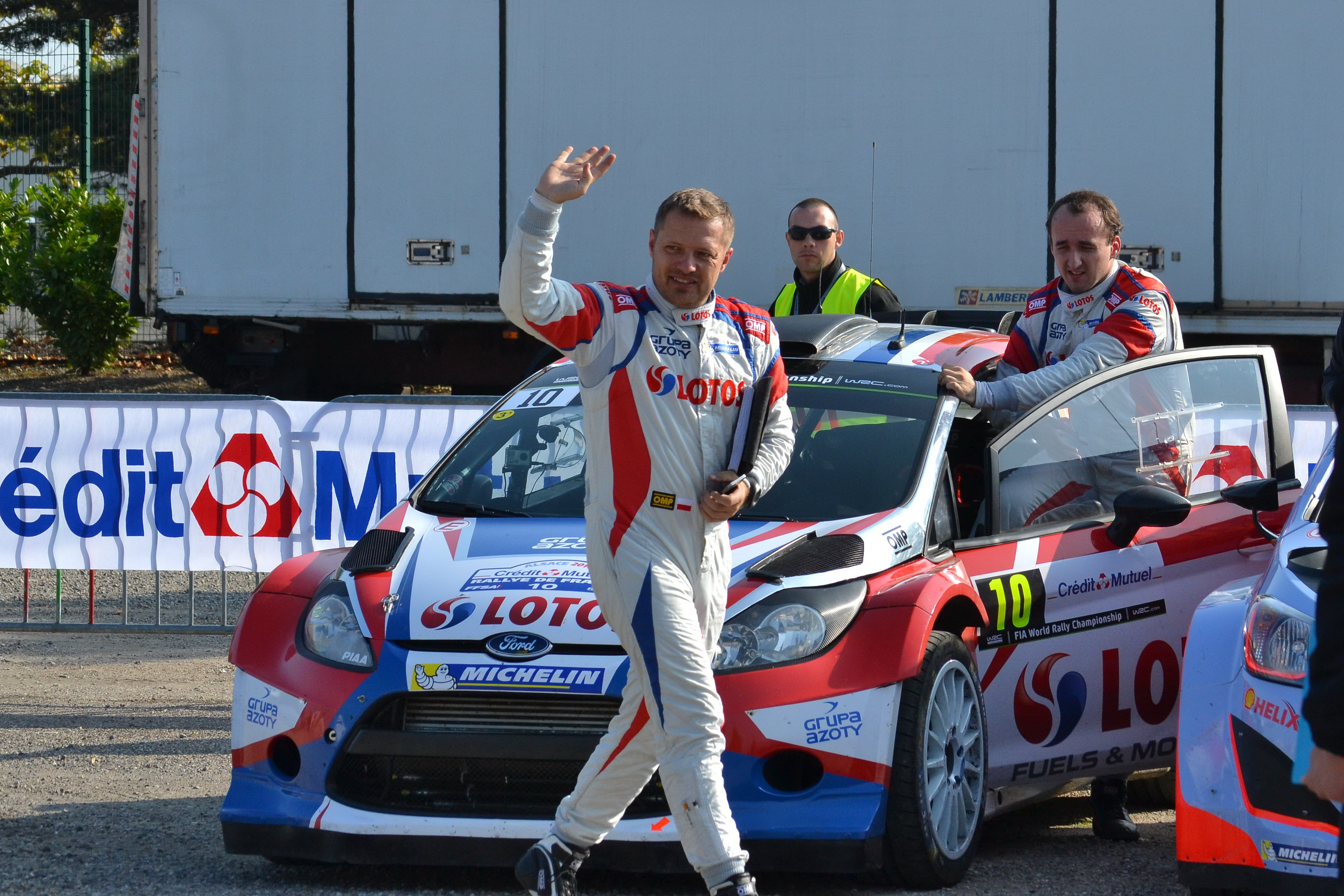
Maciej Szczepaniak during the 2014 Rallye de France-Alsace

Maciej Szczepaniak (Polish pronunciation: [ˈma.t͡ɕɛj ʂt͡ʂɛˈpa.ɲak]; born 16 December 1973 in Wałbrzych) is a Polish rally co-driver. In 2021 he became the WRC3 Co-Driver Champion as regular accomplice to driver Kajetan Kajetanowicz, who was himself beaten to the driver's championship title by Yohan Rossel. He has over one hundred WRC starts to his name in a career spanning over 25 years.

== Career ==
Szczepaniak started rallying in 1995 as a rally driver in his native Poland although has not competed as a driver since 1997. In 1998, he began his career as co-driver to Tomasz Kuchar on Polish national events enjoying some good results. The following year, the same crew became Polish F2 champions and also entered a round of the World Rally Championship, competing in the Rally San Remo finishing 37th overall and sixth in class in their Group A Volkswagen Golf kit car. Szczepaniak competed with Kuchar until 2003 on many rounds in Poland and around the globe on the WRC and European Rally Championship calendars.

Szczepaniak joined multiple-time Polish Champion Janusz Kulig on WRC rounds in 2003, but this cooperation was curtailed by Kulig's tragic death in 2004. Over the next three seasons of the Polish Rally Championship together with driver Leszek Kuzaj, Szczepaniak won the Polish championship in a Subaru Impreza. From 2007 to 2013, he was crewmate to Michał Kościuszko, entering rounds in the World Rally Championship and Poland in a variety of cars including a season in JWRC in 2009, SWRC in 2010, and PWRC in 2011. In 2011, he finished third in the PWRC championship.

In 2014, Szczepaniak became co-driver to ex-Formula One racer Robert Kubica, who had won WRC2 the previous year. They won their first rally together at Internationale Jänner Rallye in January. The crew entered in the WRC for the rest of the year in a Ford Fiesta RS WRC, Szczepaniak finished 17th overall in the co-driver championship and their best result, 6th position, came at Rally Argentina. Repeating the entry in 2015 improved their respective final championship standings to 12th. Their WRC partnership ended after Rally Monte Carlo 2016, where an accident forced their retirement and Kubica did not enter the WRC again. Szczepaniak would continue in WRC2 with youngster Hubert Ptaszek for the rest of the season despite sustaining an injury on the Rallye de Portugal. They would repeat the WRC2 campaign in four events of 2017 before contesting the ERC in 2018. Later that year, Szczepaniak began sitting with Kajetan Kajetanowicz in WRC2. A full season together in 2019 brought them second place in their WRC2 championship titles including one win at Rally Turkey. When WRC2 became WRC3 in 2020, the crew did not enjoy as much success, though in 2021, the championship fight went to the final round. Kajetanowicz was beaten in the driver's championship by Frenchman Yohan Rossel, but due to his use of multiple co-drivers through the season, Szczepaniak collected the WRC3 Co-driver Champion title.
