= 2023 Monte Carlo Rally =

91st edition of Rallye Automobile Monte-Carlo

2023 Monte Carlo Rally 91^{e} Rallye Automobile Monte-Carlo
Round 1 of 13 in the 2023 World Rally Championship
Next event →
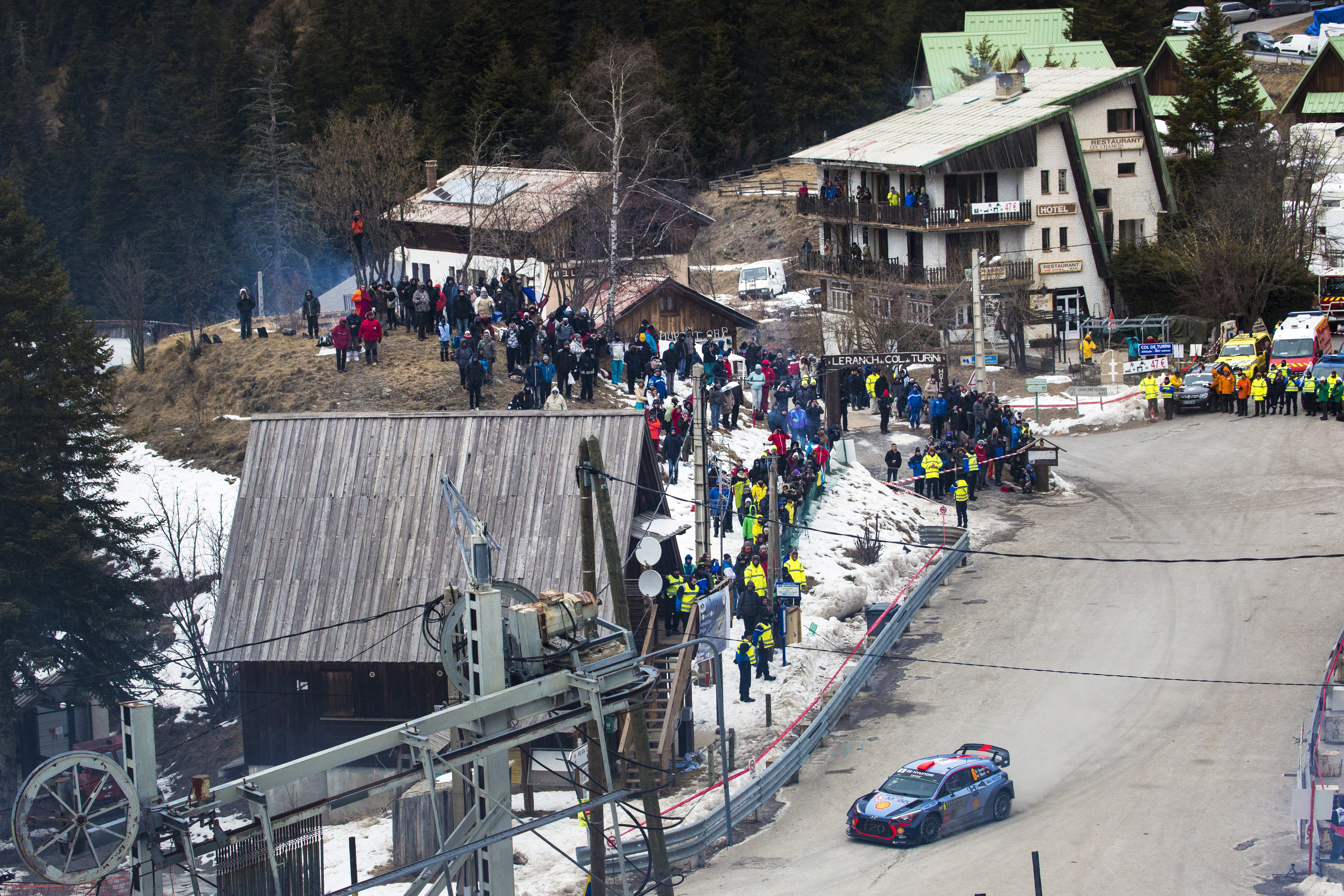
- The Monte Carlo Rally is run on a mixture of tarmac and snow stages.
- Host country: Monaco (Note: Although the rally was run in France, the Fédération Internationale de l'Automobile does not consider France to be the host nation.)
- Rally base: Monte Carlo, Monaco
- Dates run: 19 – 22 January 2023
- Start location: La Bollène-Vésubie, Alpes-Maritimes, France
- Finish location: Col de Turini, Alpes-Maritimes, France
- Stages: 18 (325.02 km; 201.96 miles)
- Stage surface: Tarmac and snow
- Transport distance: 1,209.77 km (751.72 miles)
- Overall distance: 1,534.79 km (953.67 miles)

Statistics
- Crews registered: 75
- Crews: 74 at start, 67 at finish

Overall results
- Overall winner: (France) Sébastien Ogier (France) Vincent Landais (Japan) Toyota Gazoo Racing WRT; 3:12:02.1
- Power Stage winner: (Finland) Kalle Rovanperä (Finland) Jonne Halttunen (Japan) Toyota Gazoo Racing WRT; 10:00.5

Support category results
- WRC-2 winner: (France) Yohan Rossel (France) Arnaud Dunand (France) PH Sport; 3:22:09.9
- WRC-3 winner: No classified finishers.

The 2023 Monte Carlo Rally (also known as the 91^{e} Rallye Automobile Monte-Carlo) was a motor racing event for rally cars that held over four days between 19 and 22 January 2023. It marked the ninety-first running of the Monte Carlo Rally, and was the first round of the 2023 World Rally Championship, World Rally Championship-2 and World Rally Championship-3. The 2023 event was based in Monte Carlo, Monaco and was consisted of eighteen special stages, covering a total competitive distance of 325.02 km (201.96 mi).

Sébastien Loeb and Isabelle Galmiche were the defending rally winners. However, they did not defend their titles as Loeb's schedule was conflict with the 2023 Dakar Rally. Andreas Mikkelsen and Torstein Eriksen were the defending rally winners in the WRC-2 category, while Sami Pajari and Enni Mälkönen were the defending rally winners in the WRC-3 category.

Sébastien Ogier and Vincent Landais won the rally. Their team, Toyota Gazoo Racing WRT, were the manufacturer's winners. Nikolay Gryazin and Konstantin Aleksandrov initially finished first in the World Rally Championship-2 category. However, they were given a five-second time penalty, handing the win to Yohan Rossel and Arnaud Dunand.

== Background ==
=== Entry list ===
The following crews entered into the rally. The event was opened to crews competing in the World Rally Championship, its support categories, the World Rally Championship-2 and World Rally Championship-3, and privateer entries that were not registered to score points in any championship. Ten entered under Rally1 regulations, as were twenty-seven Rally2 crews in the World Rally Championship-2.

Rally1 entries competing in the World Rally Championship
No.	Driver	Co-Driver	Entrant	Car	Championship eligibility	Tyre
4	(Finland) Esapekka Lappi	(Finland) Janne Ferm	(South Korea) Hyundai Shell Mobis WRT	Hyundai i20 N Rally1	Driver, Co-driver, Manufacturer	P
6	(Spain) Dani Sordo	(Spain) Cándido Carrera	(South Korea) Hyundai Shell Mobis WRT	Hyundai i20 N Rally1	Driver, Co-driver, Manufacturer	P
7	(France) Pierre-Louis Loubet	(Belgium) Nicolas Gilsoul	(United Kingdom) M-Sport Ford WRT	Ford Puma Rally1	Driver, Co-driver, Manufacturer	P
8	(Estonia) Ott Tänak	(Estonia) Martin Järveoja	(United Kingdom) M-Sport Ford WRT	Ford Puma Rally1	Driver, Co-driver, Manufacturer	P
9	(Greece) Jourdan Serderidis	(Belgium) Frédéric Miclotte	(United Kingdom) M-Sport Ford WRT	Ford Puma Rally1	Driver, Co-driver	P
11	(Belgium) Thierry Neuville	(Belgium) Martijn Wydaeghe	(South Korea) Hyundai Shell Mobis WRT	Hyundai i20 N Rally1	Driver, Co-driver, Manufacturer	P
17	(France) Sébastien Ogier	(France) Vincent Landais	(Japan) Toyota Gazoo Racing WRT	Toyota GR Yaris Rally1	Driver, Co-driver, Manufacturer	P
18	(Japan) Takamoto Katsuta	(Republic of Ireland) Aaron Johnston	(Japan) Toyota Gazoo Racing WRT	Toyota GR Yaris Rally1	Driver, Co-driver	P
33	(United Kingdom) Elfyn Evans	(United Kingdom) Scott Martin	(Japan) Toyota Gazoo Racing WRT	Toyota GR Yaris Rally1	Driver, Co-driver, Manufacturer	P
69	(Finland) Kalle Rovanperä	(Finland) Jonne Halttunen	(Japan) Toyota Gazoo Racing WRT	Toyota GR Yaris Rally1	Driver, Co-driver, Manufacturer	P

Rally2 entries competing in the World Rally Championship-2
No.	Driver	Co-Driver	Entrant	Car	Championship eligibility	Tyre
20	(France) Adrien Fourmaux	(France) Alexandre Coria	(United Kingdom) M-Sport Ford WRT	Ford Fiesta Rally2	Driver, Co-driver, Team	P
21	(France) Yohan Rossel	(France) Arnaud Dunand	(France) PH Sport	Citroën C3 Rally2	Driver, Co-driver	P
22	(France) Stéphane Lefebvre	(France) Andy Malfoy	(France) Stéphane Lefebvre	Citroën C3 Rally2	Driver, Co-driver	P
24	Nikolay Gryazin (Note: Nikolay Gryazin is Russian, but he competes as a neutral competitor using the ANA flag as Russian national emblems were banned by the association due to the Russian invasion of Ukraine.)	Konstantin Aleksandrov (Note: Konstantin Aleksandrov is Russian, but he competes as a neutral competitor using the ANA flag as Russian national emblems were banned by the association due to the Russian invasion of Ukraine.)	(Germany) Toksport WRT 2	Škoda Fabia RS Rally2	Challenger Driver, Challenger Co-driver, Team	P
25	(Luxembourg) Grégoire Munster	(Belgium) Louis Louka	(United Kingdom) M-Sport Ford WRT	Ford Fiesta Rally2	Challenger Driver, Challenger Co-driver, Team	P
26	(Bolivia) Marco Bulacia	(Spain) Axel Coronado Jiménez	(Germany) Toksport WRT 2	Škoda Fabia RS Rally2	Challenger Driver, Challenger Co-driver, Team	P
27	(Czech Republic) Erik Cais	(Czech Republic) Petr Těšínský	(Czech Republic) Erik Cais	Škoda Fabia RS Rally2	Challenger Driver, Challenger Co-driver	P
28	(United Kingdom) Chris Ingram	(United Kingdom) Craig Drew	(United Kingdom) Chris Ingram	Škoda Fabia Rally2 evo	Challenger Driver, Challenger Co-driver	P
29	(United States) Sean Johnston	(United States) Alexander Kihurani	(United States) Sean Johnston	Citroën C3 Rally2	Challenger Driver, Challenger Co-driver	P
31	(Republic of Ireland) Josh McErlean	(Republic of Ireland) John Rowan	(Republic of Ireland) Motorsport Ireland Rally Academy	Hyundai i20 N Rally2	Challenger Driver, Challenger Co-driver, Team	P
32	(Republic of Ireland) William Creighton	(Republic of Ireland) Liam Regan	(Republic of Ireland) Motorsport Ireland Rally Academy	Hyundai i20 N Rally2	Challenger Driver, Challenger Co-driver, Team	P
34	(Spain) Pepe López	(Spain) Borja Rozada	(Spain) Pepe López	Hyundai i20 N Rally2	Challenger Driver, Challenger Co-driver	P
35	(Spain) Alejandro Cachón	(Spain) Alejandro López Fernández	(Spain) Alejandro Cachón	Citroën C3 Rally2	Challenger Driver, Challenger Co-driver	P
36	(Italy) Mauro Miele	(Italy) Luca Beltrame	(Italy) Mauro Miele	Škoda Fabia RS Rally2	Challenger/Masters Driver, Challenger Co-driver	P
37	(France) François Delecour	(France) Sabrina De Castelli	(France) François Delecour	Škoda Fabia RS Rally2	Masters Driver, Co-driver	P
38	(Switzerland) Olivier Burri	(France) Anderson Levratti	(Switzerland) Olivier Burri	Hyundai i20 N Rally2	Driver, Co-driver	P
39	(Austria) Johannes Keferböck	(Austria) Ilka Minor	(Austria) Johannes Keferböck	Škoda Fabia Rally2 evo	Masters Driver, Co-driver	P
40	(Italy) Lorenzo Bontempelli	(Italy) Giovanni Pina	(Italy) Lorenzo Bontempelli	Škoda Fabia Rally2 evo	Driver, Co-driver	P
41	(Spain) Daniel Alonso Villarón	(Spain) Adrián Pérez Fernández	(Spain) Daniel Alonso Villarón	Citroën C3 Rally2	Masters Driver, Co-driver	P
42	(Republic of Ireland) Eamonn Boland	(Republic of Ireland) Michael Joseph Morrissey	(Republic of Ireland) Eamonn Boland	Citroën C3 Rally2	Masters Driver, Masters Co-driver	P
44	(France) Frédéric Rosati	(France) Philippe Marchetto	(France) Frédéric Rosati	Hyundai i20 N Rally2	Masters Driver, Masters Co-driver	P
45	(Italy) Silvano Patera	(Italy) Stefano Tiraboschi	(Italy) Silvano Patera	Škoda Fabia Rally2 evo	Masters Driver, Co-driver	P
46	(Italy) Simone Niboli	(Italy) Battista Brunetti	(Italy) Simone Niboli	Škoda Fabia Rally2 evo	Masters Driver, Masters Co-driver	P
47	(Italy) Filippo Marchino	(Italy) Pietro Elia Ometto	(Italy) Filippo Marchino	Škoda Fabia R5	Masters Driver, Masters Co-driver	P
48	(Italy) Fabrizio Arengi Bentivoglio	(Italy) Massimiliano Bosi	(Italy) Fabrizio Arengi Bentivoglio	Škoda Fabia Rally2 evo	Challenger/Masters Driver, Masters Co-driver	P
49	(Italy) Christian Merli	(Italy) Marco Zortea	(Italy) Christian Merli	Škoda Fabia Rally2 evo	Masters Driver, Masters Co-driver	P
50	(Netherlands) Henk Vossen	(Netherlands) Annemieke Hulzebos	(Netherlands) Henk Vossen	Ford Fiesta R5	Challenger/Masters Driver, Challenger/Masters Co-driver	P

Other major entries
No.	Driver	Co-Driver	Entrant	Car	Championship eligibility	Tyre
23	(Sweden) Oliver Solberg	(United Kingdom) Elliott Edmondson	(Sweden) Oliver Solberg	Škoda Fabia RS Rally2	—N/a	P
30	(Finland) Sami Pajari	(Finland) Enni Mälkönen	(Germany) Toksport WRT	Škoda Fabia RS Rally2	—N/a	—N/a
62	(Hungary) Zoltán László	(Hungary) Gábor Zsiros	(Hungary) Zoltán László	Škoda Fabia Rally2 evo	Masters Driver	P

=== Itinerary ===
All dates and times are CET (UTC+1).

Date	No.	Time span	Stage name	Distance
19 January	—N/a	After 9:31	Sainte-Agnès / Peille [Shakedown]	2.29 km
19 January		After 18:30	Opening ceremony, Monaco	—N/a
19 January	SS1	After 20:05	La Bollène-Vésubie / Col de Turini 1	15.12 km
19 January	SS2	After 21:03	La Cabanette / Col de Castillon	24.90 km
19 January		22:43 – 23:33	Flexi service A, Monaco	—N/a
20 January		7:01 – 7:21	Service B, Monaco	—N/a
20 January	SS3	After 9:09	Roure / Roubion / Beuil 1	18.33 km
20 January	SS4	After 10:22	Puget-Théniers / Saint-Antonin 1	19.79 km
20 January	SS5	After 11:25	Briançonnet / Entrevaux 1	14.55 km
20 January		12:40 – 12:55	Tyre fitting zone, Puget-Théniers	—N/a
20 January	SS6	After 14:23	Roure / Roubion / Beuil 2	18.33 km
20 January	SS7	After 15:36	Puget-Théniers / Saint-Antonin 2	19.79 km
20 January	SS8	After 16:39	Briançonnet / Entrevaux 2	14.55 km
20 January		18:54 – 19:44	Flexi service C, Monaco	—N/a
21 January		5:56 – 6:16	Service D, Monaco	—N/a
21 January	SS9	After 8:24	Le Fugeret / Thorame-Haute 1	16.80 km
21 January	SS10	After 10:05	Malijai / Puimichel 1	17.31 km
21 January	SS11	After 12:17	Ubraye / Entrevaux 1	21.78 km
21 January		13:36 – 13:51	Tyre fitting zone, Puget-Théniers	—N/a
21 January	SS12	After 14:31	Le Fugeret / Thorame-Haute 2	16.80 km
21 January	SS13	After 16:05	Malijai / Puimichel 2	17.31 km
21 January	SS14	After 18:23	Ubraye / Entrevaux 2	21.78 km
21 January		20:48 – 21:38	Flexi service E, Monaco	—N/a
22 January		6:34 – 6:54	Service F, Monaco	—N/a
22 January	SS15	After 7:57	Lucéram / Lantosque 1	18.82 km
22 January	SS16	After 9:05	La Bollène-Vésubie / Col de Turini 2	15.12 km
22 January	SS17	After 10:40	Lucéram / Lantosque 2	18.82 km
22 January	SS18	After 12:18	La Bollène-Vésubie / Col de Turini 3 [Power Stage]	15.12 km
22 January		After 16:15	Prize giving ceremony, Monaco	—N/a

== Report ==
=== WRC Rally1 ===
==== Classification ====
Position		No.	Driver	Co-driver	Entrant	Car	Time	Difference	Points	
Event	Class	No.	Driver	Co-driver	Entrant	Car	Time	Difference	Event	Stage
1	1	17	(France) Sébastien Ogier	(France) Vincent Landais	Toyota Gazoo Racing WRT	Toyota GR Yaris Rally1	3:12:02.1	0.0	25	1
2	2	69	(Finland) Kalle Rovanperä	(Finland) Jonne Halttunen	Toyota Gazoo Racing WRT	Toyota GR Yaris Rally1	3:12:20.8	+18.7	18	5
3	3	11	(Belgium) Thierry Neuville	(Belgium) Martijn Wydaeghe	Hyundai Shell Mobis WRT	Hyundai i20 N Rally1	3:12:46.7	+44.6	15	2
4	4	33	(United Kingdom) Elfyn Evans	(United Kingdom) Scott Martin	Toyota Gazoo Racing WRT	Toyota GR Yaris Rally1	3:13:14.4	+1:12.3	12	3
5	5	8	(Estonia) Ott Tänak	(Estonia) Martin Järveoja	M-Sport Ford WRT	Ford Puma Rally1	3:14:36.9	+2:34.8	10	4
6	6	18	(Japan) Takamoto Katsuta	(Republic of Ireland) Aaron Johnston	Toyota Gazoo Racing WRT	Toyota GR Yaris Rally1	2:46:03.6	+2:11.3	8	0
7	7	6	(Spain) Dani Sordo	(Spain) Cándido Carrera	Hyundai Shell Mobis WRT	Hyundai i20 N Rally1	3:15:49.5	+3:47.4	6	0
8	8	4	(Finland) Esapekka Lappi	(Finland) Janne Ferm	Hyundai Shell Mobis WRT	Hyundai i20 N Rally1	3:15:53.4	+3:51.3	4	0
24	9	9	(Greece) Jourdan Serderidis	(Belgium) Frédéric Miclotte	M-Sport Ford WRT	Ford Puma Rally1	3:38:52.3	+26:50.2	0	0
Retired SS17		7	(France) Pierre-Louis Loubet	(Belgium) Nicolas Gilsoul	M-Sport Ford WRT	Ford Puma Rally1	Mechanical		0	0

==== Special stages ====
Stage	Winners	Car	Time	Class leaders
SD	Ogier / Landais	Toyota GR Yaris Rally1	1:44.6	—N/a
SS1	Ogier / Landais	Toyota GR Yaris Rally1	10:22.9	(France) Ogier / (France) Landais
SS2	Ogier / Landais	Toyota GR Yaris Rally1	16:10.8	(France) Ogier / (France) Landais
SS3	Ogier / Landais	Toyota GR Yaris Rally1	9:54.7	(France) Ogier / (France) Landais
SS4	Ogier / Landais	Toyota GR Yaris Rally1	11:44.7	(France) Ogier / (France) Landais
SS5	Ogier / Landais	Toyota GR Yaris Rally1	8:30.7	(France) Ogier / (France) Landais
SS6	Evans / Martin	Toyota GR Yaris Rally1	9:49.3	(France) Ogier / (France) Landais
SS7	Ogier / Landais	Toyota GR Yaris Rally1	11:38.7	(France) Ogier / (France) Landais
SS8	Rovanperä / Halttunen	Toyota GR Yaris Rally1	8:24.0	(France) Ogier / (France) Landais
SS9	Rovanperä / Halttunen	Toyota GR Yaris Rally1	9:05.5	(France) Ogier / (France) Landais
SS10	Ogier / Landais	Toyota GR Yaris Rally1	9:27.1	(France) Ogier / (France) Landais
SS11	Rovanperä / Halttunen	Toyota GR Yaris Rally1	11:35.7	(France) Ogier / (France) Landais
SS12	Neuville / Wydaeghe	Hyundai i20 N Rally1	9:01.8	(France) Ogier / (France) Landais
SS13	Neuville / Wydaeghe	Hyundai i20 N Rally1	9:27.6	(France) Ogier / (France) Landais
SS14	Rovanperä / Halttunen	Toyota GR Yaris Rally1	11:30.2	(France) Ogier / (France) Landais
SS15	Ogier / Landais	Toyota GR Yaris Rally1	12:17.9	(France) Ogier / (France) Landais
SS16	Rovanperä / Halttunen	Toyota GR Yaris Rally1	10:08.9	(France) Ogier / (France) Landais
SS17	Ogier / Landais	Toyota GR Yaris Rally1	12:17.0	(France) Ogier / (France) Landais
SS18	Rovanperä / Halttunen	Toyota GR Yaris Rally1	10:00.5	(France) Ogier / (France) Landais

==== Championship standings ====
Pos.	Drivers' championships			Co-drivers' championships			Manufacturers' championships		
Pos.	Move	Driver	Points	Move	Co-driver	Points	Move	Manufacturer	Points
1	New entry	Sébastien Ogier	26	New entry	Vincent Landais	26	New entry	Toyota Gazoo Racing WRT	51
2	New entry	Kalle Rovanperä	23	New entry	Jonne Halttunen	23	New entry	Hyundai Shell Mobis WRT	27
3	New entry	Thierry Neuville	17	New entry	Martijn Wydaeghe	17	New entry	M-Sport Ford WRT	16
4	New entry	Elfyn Evans	15	New entry	Scott Martin	15			
5	New entry	Ott Tänak	14	New entry	Martin Järveoja	14			

=== WRC-2 Rally2 ===
==== Classification ====
Position		No.	Driver	Co-driver	Entrant	Car	Time	Difference	Points		
Event	Class	No.	Driver	Co-driver	Entrant	Car	Time	Difference	Class	Stage	Event
9	1	21	Yohan Rossel	Arnaud Dunand	PH Sport	Citroën C3 Rally2	3:22:09.9	0.0	25	3	2
10	2	24	Nikolay Gryazin	Konstantin Aleksandrov	Toksport WRT 2	Škoda Fabia RS Rally2	3:22:10.4	+0.5	18	2	1
11	3	34	Pepe López	Borja Rozada	Pepe López	Hyundai i20 N Rally2	3:23:16.1	+1:10.7	15	0	0
12	4	27	Erik Cais	Petr Těšínský	Erik Cais	Škoda Fabia RS Rally2	3:23:35.8	+1:30.4	12	0	0
13	5	20	Adrien Fourmaux	Alexandre Coria	M-Sport Ford WRT	Ford Fiesta Rally2	3:24:01.8	+1:56.4	10	0	0
15	6	28	Chris Ingram	Craig Drew	Chris Ingram	Škoda Fabia Rally2 evo	3:25:12.1	+3:06.7	8	0	0
16	7	26	Marco Bulacia	Axel Coronado	Toksport WRT 2	Škoda Fabia RS Rally2	3:26:50.4	+4:45.0	6	0	0
17	8	25	Grégoire Munster	Louis Louka	M-Sport Ford WRT	Ford Fiesta Rally2	3:26:54.9	+4:49.5	4	0	0
18	9	22	Stéphane Lefebvre	Andy Malfoy	Stéphane Lefebvre	Citroën C3 Rally2	3:27:45.9	+5:40.5	2	1	0
19	10	37	François Delecour	Sabrina De Castelli	François Delecour	Škoda Fabia RS Rally2	3:28:12.6	+6:07.2	1	0	0
20	11	35	Alejandro Cachón	Alejandro López Fernández	Alejandro Cachón	Citroën C3 Rally2	3:28:50.8	+6:45.4	0	0	0
22	12	36	Mauro Miele	Luca Beltrame	Mauro Miele	Škoda Fabia RS Rally2	3:32:46.6	+10:41.2	0	0	0
25	13	49	Christian Merli	Marco Zortea	Christian Merli	Škoda Fabia Rally2 evo	3:39:02.7	+16:57.3	0	0	0
27	14	39	Johannes Keferböck	Ilka Minor	Johannes Keferböck	Škoda Fabia Rally2 evo	3:40:24.0	+18:18.6	0	0	0
33	15	40	Lorenzo Bontempelli	Giovanni Pina	Lorenzo Bontempelli	Škoda Fabia Rally2 evo	3:47:24.3	+25:18.9	0	0	0
35	16	46	Simone Niboli	Battista Brunetti	Simone Niboli	Škoda Fabia Rally2 evo	3:49:02.6	+26:57.2	0	0	0
41	17	45	Silvano Patera	Stefano Tiraboschi	Silvano Patera	Škoda Fabia Rally2 evo	3:54:19.8	+32:14.4	0	0	0
45	18	32	William Creighton	Liam Regan	Motorsport Ireland Rally Academy	Hyundai i20 N Rally2	3:57:18.0	+35:12.6	0	0	0
48	19	47	Filippo Marchino	Pietro Elia Ometto	Filippo Marchino	Škoda Fabia R5	4:01:58.4	+39:53.0	0	0	0
52	20	48	Fabrizio Arengi Bentivoglio	Massimiliano Bosi	Fabrizio Arengi Bentivoglio	Škoda Fabia Rally2 evo	4:09:30.5	+47:25.1	0	0	0
56	21	50	Henk Vossen	Annemieke Hulzebos	Henk Vossen	Ford Fiesta R5	4:14:05.8	+52:00.4	0	0	0
57	22	31	Josh McErlean	John Rowan	Motorsport Ireland Rally Academy	Hyundai i20 N Rally2	4:15:45.1	+53:39.7	0	0	0
59	23	38	Olivier Burri	Anderson Levratti	Olivier Burri	Hyundai i20 N Rally2	4:23:05.9	+1:01:00.5	0	0	0
61	24	41	Daniel Alonso Villarón	Adrián Pérez Fernández	Daniel Alonso Villarón	Citroën C3 Rally2	4:34:35.1	+1:12:29.7	0	0	0
Retired SS17		44	Frédéric Rosati	Philippe Marchetto	Frédéric Rosati	Hyundai i20 N Rally2	Mechanical		0	0	0
Retired SS16		29	Sean Johnston	Alexander Kihurani	Sean Johnston	Citroën C3 Rally2	Accident		0	0	0
Retired SS15		42	Eamonn Boland	Michael Joseph Morrissey	Eamonn Boland	Citroën C3 Rally2	Withdrawn		0	0	0

==== Special stages ====
Overall
Stage	Winners	Car	Time	Class leaders
SS1	Gryazin / Aleksandrov	Škoda Fabia RS Rally2	10:46.9	Gryazin / Aleksandrov
SS2	Gryazin / Aleksandrov	Škoda Fabia RS Rally2	16:53.4	Gryazin / Aleksandrov
SS3	Rossel / Dunand	Citroën C3 Rally2	10:30.4	Gryazin / Aleksandrov
SS4	Gryazin / Aleksandrov	Škoda Fabia RS Rally2	12:20.6	Gryazin / Aleksandrov
SS5	Gryazin / Aleksandrov	Škoda Fabia RS Rally2	8:52.4	Gryazin / Aleksandrov
SS6	Gryazin / Aleksandrov	Škoda Fabia RS Rally2	10:19.7	Gryazin / Aleksandrov
SS7	Gryazin / Aleksandrov	Škoda Fabia RS Rally2	12:15.4	Gryazin / Aleksandrov
SS8	Cais / Těšínský	Škoda Fabia RS Rally2	8:51.6	Gryazin / Aleksandrov
SS9	Gryazin / Aleksandrov	Škoda Fabia RS Rally2	9:30.4	Gryazin / Aleksandrov
SS10	López / Rozada	Hyundai i20 N Rally2	10:01.7	Gryazin / Aleksandrov
SS11	Gryazin / Aleksandrov	Škoda Fabia RS Rally2	12:11.9	Gryazin / Aleksandrov
SS12	Cais / Těšínský	Škoda Fabia RS Rally2	9:32.8	Gryazin / Aleksandrov
SS13	López / Rozada	Hyundai i20 N Rally2	10:02.0	Gryazin / Aleksandrov
SS14	Cais / Těšínský	Škoda Fabia RS Rally2	12:03.8	Gryazin / Aleksandrov
SS15	Rossel / Dunand	Citroën C3 Rally2	12:51.0	Gryazin / Aleksandrov
SS16	Rossel / Dunand	Citroën C3 Rally2	10:33.7	Gryazin / Aleksandrov
SS17	Gryazin / Aleksandrov	Škoda Fabia RS Rally2	12:43.5	Gryazin / Aleksandrov
SS18	Rossel / Dunand	Citroën C3 Rally2	10:28.5	Gryazin / Aleksandrov

Challenger
Stage	Winners	Car	Time	Class leaders
SS1	Gryazin / Aleksandrov	Škoda Fabia RS Rally2	10:46.9	Gryazin / Aleksandrov
SS2	Gryazin / Aleksandrov	Škoda Fabia RS Rally2	16:53.4	Gryazin / Aleksandrov
SS3	Gryazin / Aleksandrov	Škoda Fabia RS Rally2	10:31.1	Gryazin / Aleksandrov
SS4	Gryazin / Aleksandrov	Škoda Fabia RS Rally2	12:20.6	Gryazin / Aleksandrov
SS5	Gryazin / Aleksandrov	Škoda Fabia RS Rally2	8:52.4	Gryazin / Aleksandrov
SS6	Gryazin / Aleksandrov	Škoda Fabia RS Rally2	10:19.7	Gryazin / Aleksandrov
SS7	Gryazin / Aleksandrov	Škoda Fabia RS Rally2	12:15.4	Gryazin / Aleksandrov
SS8	Cais / Těšínský	Škoda Fabia RS Rally2	8:51.6	Gryazin / Aleksandrov
SS9	Gryazin / Aleksandrov	Škoda Fabia RS Rally2	9:30.4	Gryazin / Aleksandrov
SS10	López / Rozada	Hyundai i20 N Rally2	10:01.7	Gryazin / Aleksandrov
SS11	Gryazin / Aleksandrov	Škoda Fabia RS Rally2	12:11.9	Gryazin / Aleksandrov
SS12	Cais / Těšínský	Škoda Fabia RS Rally2	9:32.8	Gryazin / Aleksandrov
SS13	López / Rozada	Hyundai i20 N Rally2	10:02.0	Gryazin / Aleksandrov
SS14	Cais / Těšínský	Škoda Fabia RS Rally2	12:03.8	Gryazin / Aleksandrov
SS15	Gryazin / Aleksandrov	Škoda Fabia RS Rally2	12:55.7	Gryazin / Aleksandrov
SS16	Gryazin / Aleksandrov	Škoda Fabia RS Rally2	10:34.5	Gryazin / Aleksandrov
SS17	Gryazin / Aleksandrov	Škoda Fabia RS Rally2	12:43.5	Gryazin / Aleksandrov
SS18	Gryazin / Aleksandrov	Škoda Fabia RS Rally2	10:34.2	Gryazin / Aleksandrov

==== Championship standings ====
Pos.	Open Drivers' championships			Open Co-drivers' championships			Teams' championships			Challenger Drivers' championships			Challenger Co-drivers' championships		
Pos.	Move	Driver	Points	Move	Co-driver	Points	Move	Manufacturer	Points	Move	Manufacturer	Points	Move	Driver	Points
1	New entry	Yohan Rossel	28	New entry	Arnaud Dunand	28	New entry	Toksport WRT 2	40	New entry	Nikolay Gryazin	25	New entry	Konstantin Aleksandrov	25
2	New entry	Nikolay Gryazin	20	New entry	Konstantin Aleksandrov	20	New entry	M-Sport Ford WRT	30	New entry	Pepe López	18	New entry	Borja Rozada	18
3	New entry	Pepe López	15	New entry	Borja Rozada	15	New entry	Motorsport Ireland Rally Academy	18	New entry	Erik Cais	15	New entry	Petr Těšínský	15
4	New entry	Erik Cais	12	New entry	Petr Těšínský	12				New entry	Chris Ingram	12	New entry	Craig Drew	12
5	New entry	Adrien Fourmaux	10	New entry	Alexandre Coria	10				New entry	Marco Bulacia	10	New entry	Axel Coronado	10

=== WRC-3 Rally3 ===
No Rally3 crews entered the round.

== Notes ==
Previous rally: 2022 Rally Japan (2022)	2023 FIA World Rally Championship	Next rally: 2023 Rally Sweden
Previous rally: 2022 Monte Carlo Rally	2023 Monte Carlo Rally	Next rally: 2024 Monte Carlo Rally
