= 2023 WRC2 Championship =

Motorsport championship

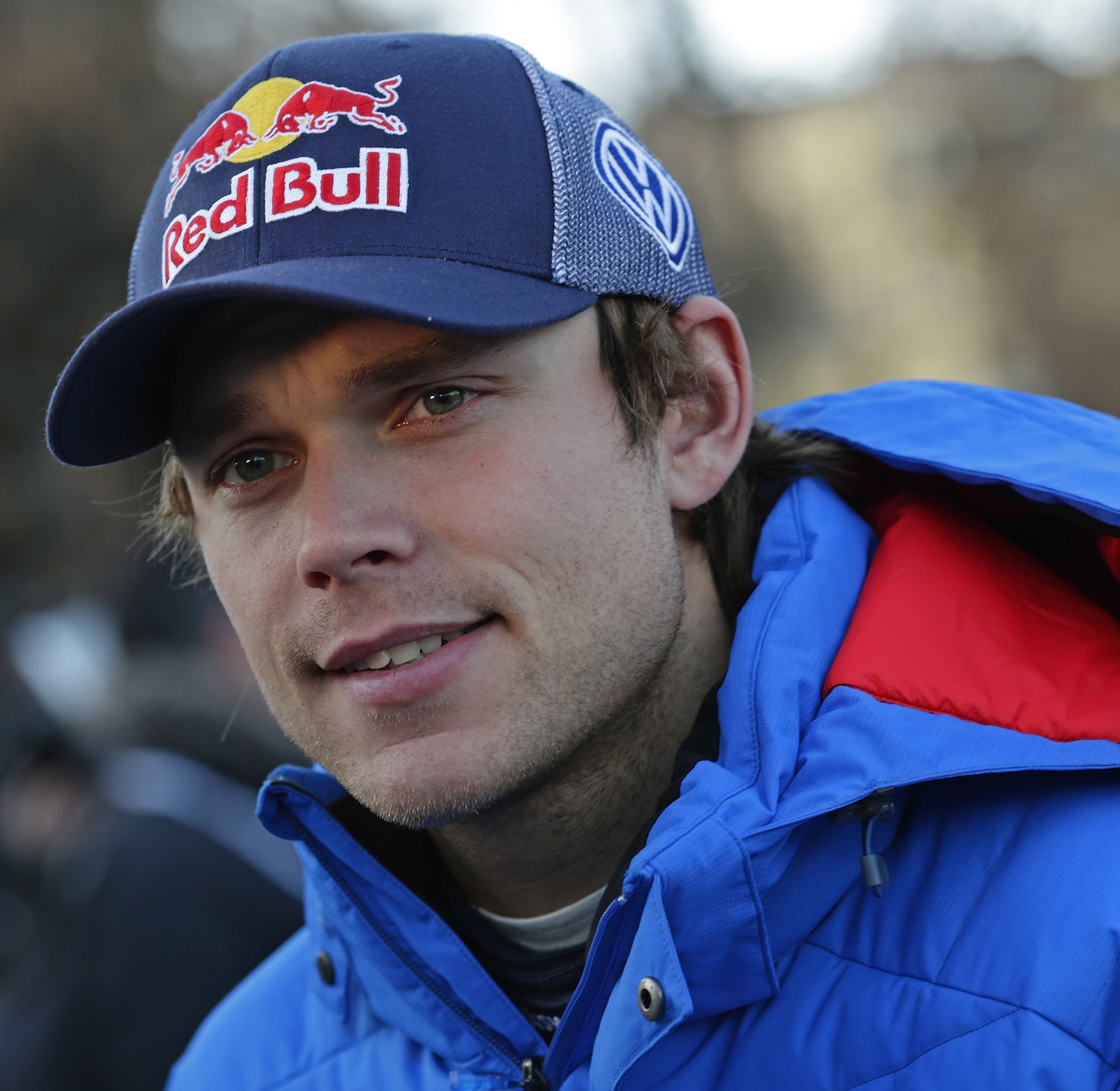
Andreas Mikkelsen won his second WRC-2 drivers championship.

The 2023 FIA WRC2 Championship was the eleventh season of WRC2, a rallying championship organised and governed by the Fédération Internationale de l'Automobile as the second-highest tier of international rallying. The category was open to crews with cars complying with Group Rally2 regulations. The championship began in January 2023 with the Rallye Monte-Carlo and concluded in November with Rally Japan, and ran in support of the 2023 World Rally Championship.

Emil Lindholm and Reeta Hämäläinen entered as the defending drivers' and co-drivers' champions, while Toksport WRT entered as the defending teams' champions.

Andreas Mikkelsen and Torstein Eriksen became the 2023 WRC-2 champions, their second title victories in the championship. Toksport WRT 3 took victory in the teams' championship.

== Calendar ==
A map showing the locations of the rallies in the 2023 championship. Event headquarters are marked with black dots.

The 2023 season was contested over thirteen rounds crossing Europe, Africa, North and South America, and Asia.

Round	Start date	Finish date	Rally	Rally headquarters	Surface	Stages	Distance	Ref.
1	19 January	22 January	(Monaco) Rallye Automobile Monte Carlo	Monte Carlo, Monaco	Mixed (Note: The Monte Carlo Rally is run on a tarmac and snow surface.)	18	325.02 km	
2	9 February	12 February	Rally Sweden	Umeå, Västerbotten County, Sweden	Snow	18	301.18 km	
3	16 March	19 March	(Mexico) Rally Guanajuato México	León, Guanajuato, Mexico	Gravel	23	315.69 km	
4	20 April	23 April	Croatia Rally	Zagreb, Croatia	Tarmac	20	301.26 km	
5	11 May	14 May	Rally de Portugal	Matosinhos, Porto, Portugal	Gravel	19	329.06 km	
6	1 June	4 June	(Italy) Rally Italia Sardegna	Olbia, Sardinia, Italy	Gravel	19	322.88 km	
7	22 June	25 June	Safari Rally Kenya	Naivasha, Nakuru County, Kenya	Gravel	19	355.92 km	
8	20 July	23 July	Rally Estonia	Tartu, Estonia	Gravel	21	300.41 km	
9	3 August	6 August	Rally Finland	Jyväskylä, Central Finland, Finland	Gravel	22	320.56 km	
10	7 September	10 September	Acropolis Rally Greece	Lamia, Central Greece, Greece	Gravel	15	270.89 km	
11	28 September	1 October	Rally Chile	Concepción, Biobío, Chile	Gravel	16	321.06 km	
12	26 October	29 October	(Europe) Central European Rally	Passau, Bavaria, Germany	Tarmac	18	310.01 km	
13	16 November	19 November	Rally Japan	Toyota, Aichi, Japan	Tarmac	22	304.66 km	

=== Calendar changes ===
The championship was expected to be expanded to fourteen rounds from the thirteen rounds in the previous season by WRC Promoter GmbH, with eight Europe-based rallies and six fly-away events covering the season. However, when the calendar was released in late November following a lengthy delay, the number of the events was reduced to thirteen with the anticipated Saudi Arabian rally based at Jeddah, absent from the calendar.

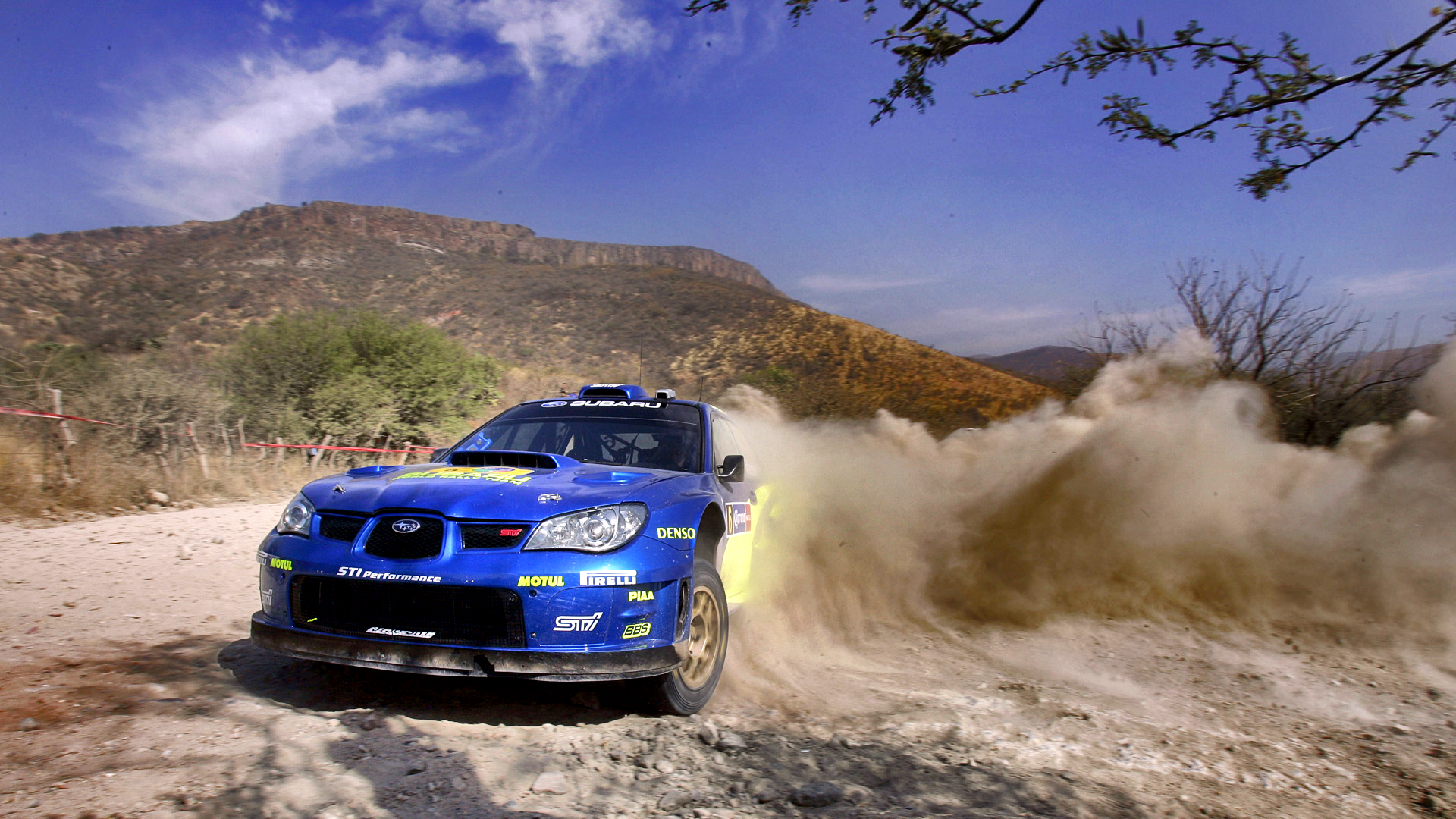
Rally Mexico (pictured in 2008 with a Subaru Impreza WRC) returned to the calendar.

- Rally Mexico returned to championship after missing the 2021 and 2022 championships. The organizers of the rally had previously held a national event in 2022 as a prelude for the 2023 return.
- Rally Chile rejoined the calendar after having been ruled out in 2020 and 2021 due to the Chilean protests and COVID-19 pandemic respectively.
- The Central European Rally, a tri-nation event held across Germany, Austria and the Czech Republic, was introduced into the championship, replacing the Catalonian Rally. The rally was based out of southeast Germany, in the city of Passau in Bavaria, and ran on tarmac.
- Rally New Zealand, a round of the 2022 season, was not included on the calendar, but the organizers tried to seek an opportunity for a 2024 return as a part of the rotation program with Rally Australia.
- Ypres Rally Belgium, which was a part of the championship for the prior two seasons, dropped off the calendar and instead formed part of the 2023 British Rally Championship.

Several rally organizers also expressed their interests to return to the championship, including Rally Argentina, Rally Australia, the German Rally, and an event in Northern Ireland. The Argentine, Australian and Northern Irish bids failed and Germany organized the Central European Rally along with Austria and the Czech Republic. In addition to the candidate events, the WRC Promoter GmbH was also working on the calendar expansion to the Middle East and United States, but no rallies were added for the 2023 season.

=== Location changes ===
- The headquarters of the Rally Italia Sardegna would be once again moved from Alghero to Olbia. The 2020 event was previously headquartered in Olbia as a result of major route revisions due to the COVID-19 pandemic.
- The 2023 edition of the Safari Rally was headquartered at the Lakeside town of Naivasha. The rally was previously headquartered in the Kenyan capital Nairobi.

== Entries ==
The following teams and crews contested the 2023 WRC2. Teams had to enter two crews to be eligible for Teams' Championship points.

Crews entered by or via teams
Entrant	Car	Driver		Co-driver		Rounds
Entrant	Car	Driver name	Category	Co-driver name	Category	Rounds
(South Korea) Hyundai Motorsport N	Hyundai i20 N Rally2	(Finland) Emil Lindholm		(Finland) Reeta Hämäläinen		8–9, 11–12
(South Korea) Hyundai Motorsport N	Hyundai i20 N Rally2	(Finland) Teemu Suninen		(Finland) Mikko Markkula		2, 5–6
(South Korea) Hyundai Motorsport N	Hyundai i20 N Rally2	(Paraguay) Fabrizio Zaldivar	Challenger	(Argentina) Marcelo Der Ohannesian	Challenger	2, 5–6, 8–9, 11–12
(United Kingdom) M-Sport Ford WRT	Ford Fiesta Rally2	(France) Adrien Fourmaux		(France) Alexandre Coria		1, 3–6, 9–10
(United Kingdom) M-Sport Ford WRT	Ford Fiesta Rally2	(Luxembourg) Grégoire Munster	Challenger	(Belgium) Louis Louka	Challenger	1, 4–7, 9–10
(United Kingdom) M-Sport Ford WRT	Ford Fiesta Rally2	(Greece) George Vassilakis	Challenger	(United Kingdom) Tom Krawszik	Challenger	7
(United Kingdom) M-Sport Ford WRT	Ford Fiesta Rally2	(Estonia) Robert Virves	Challenger	(Portugal) Hugo Magalhães	Challenger	2, 5–6, 10
(Republic of Ireland) Motorsport Ireland Rally Academy	Hyundai i20 N Rally2	(Republic of Ireland) William Creighton	Challenger	(Republic of Ireland) Liam Regan	Challenger	1
(Republic of Ireland) Motorsport Ireland Rally Academy	Hyundai i20 N Rally2	(Republic of Ireland) Eamonn Kelly	Challenger	(Republic of Ireland) Conor Mohan	Challenger	5, 9
(Republic of Ireland) Motorsport Ireland Rally Academy	Hyundai i20 N Rally2	(Republic of Ireland) Josh McErlean	Challenger	(Republic of Ireland) John Rowan	Challenger	1, 4–6
(Republic of Ireland) Motorsport Ireland Rally Academy	Hyundai i20 N Rally2	(Republic of Ireland) Josh McErlean	Challenger	(Republic of Ireland) James Fulton		8–9, 12
(Republic of Ireland) Motorsport Ireland Rally Academy	Hyundai i20 N Rally2	(Republic of Ireland) Patrick O'Brien	Challenger	(Republic of Ireland) Stephen O'Brien	Challenger	4, 6
(France) PH Sport	Citroën C3 Rally2	(France) Yohan Rossel		(France) Arnaud Dunand		1, 4–6, 10–12
(Germany) Toksport WRT	Škoda Fabia RS Rally2	(Bolivia) Marco Bulacia	Challenger	(Spain) Diego Vallejo	Challenger	8–11
(Germany) Toksport WRT	Škoda Fabia RS Rally2	(United Kingdom) Gus Greensmith		(Sweden) Jonas Andersson		11
(Germany) Toksport WRT	Škoda Fabia RS Rally2	(Finland) Emil Lindholm		(Finland) Reeta Hämäläinen		2, 4
(Germany) Toksport WRT	Škoda Fabia RS Rally2	(Finland) Sami Pajari	Challenger	(Finland) Enni Mälkönen	Challenger	2, 4, 6, 8
(Germany) Toksport WRT 2	Škoda Fabia RS Rally2	(Bolivia) Marco Bulacia	Challenger	(Spain) Axel Coronado	Challenger	1
(Germany) Toksport WRT 2	Škoda Fabia RS Rally2	(Bolivia) Marco Bulacia	Challenger	(Spain) Diego Vallejo	Challenger	2, 5
(Germany) Toksport WRT 2	Škoda Fabia RS Rally2	Nikolay Gryazin (Note: Nikolay Gryazin is a Russian national, but competes as an Authorised Neutral Athlete in accordance with recommendations made by the International Olympic Committee, following a decision by the FIA to ban all connections with Russia following the Russian invasion of Ukraine.)	Challenger	Konstantin Aleksandrov (Note: Konstantin Aleksandrov is a Russian national, but competes as an Authorised Neutral Athlete in accordance with recommendations made by the International Olympic Committee, following a decision by the FIA to ban all connections with Russia following the Russian invasion of Ukraine.)	Challenger	1, 4, 6, 9–12
(Germany) Toksport WRT 2	Škoda Fabia RS Rally2	(United Kingdom) Gus Greensmith		(Sweden) Jonas Andersson		4
(Germany) Toksport WRT 2	Škoda Fabia RS Rally2	(Finland) Sami Pajari	Challenger	(Finland) Enni Mälkönen	Challenger	9–12
(Germany) Toksport WRT 2	Škoda Fabia Rally2 evo	Nikolay Gryazin	Challenger	Konstantin Aleksandrov	Challenger	3
(Germany) Toksport WRT 2	Škoda Fabia Rally2 evo	(Finland) Emil Lindholm		(Finland) Reeta Hämäläinen		3
(Germany) Toksport WRT 3	Škoda Fabia RS Rally2	(United Kingdom) Gus Greensmith		(Sweden) Jonas Andersson		5, 8–10, 12
(Germany) Toksport WRT 3	Škoda Fabia RS Rally2	(Norway) Andreas Mikkelsen		(Norway) Torstein Eriksen		5–6, 8–10, 12–13
(Germany) Toksport WRT 3	Škoda Fabia RS Rally2	Nikolay Gryazin	Challenger	Konstantin Aleksandrov	Challenger	13

Private entries
Car	Driver		Co-driver		Rounds
Car	Driver name	Category	Co-driver name	Category	Rounds
Citroën C3 Rally2	(Spain) Daniel Alonso		(Spain) Adrián Pérez		1–2
Citroën C3 Rally2	(Republic of Ireland) Eamonn Boland		(Republic of Ireland) Michael Joseph Morrissey		1
Citroën C3 Rally2	(Republic of Ireland) Eamonn Boland	Challenger	(Republic of Ireland) Michael Joseph Morrissey	Challenger	4, 12–13
Citroën C3 Rally2	(Spain) Alejandro Cachón	Challenger	(Spain) Alejandro López	Challenger	1, 4–6, 10, 12
Citroën C3 Rally2	(Portugal) Paulo Caldeira	Challenger	(Portugal) Ana Gonçalves	Challenger	5
Citroën C3 Rally2	(Portugal) José Pedro Fontes	Challenger	(Portugal) Inês Ponte	Challenger	5
Citroën C3 Rally2	(Chile) Alberto Heller	Challenger	(Argentina) Luis Ernesto Allende	Challenger	5
Citroën C3 Rally2	(Chile) Pedro Heller	Challenger	(Argentina) Pablo Olmos	Challenger	11
Citroën C3 Rally2	(Japan) Satoshi Imai	Challenger	(New Zealand) Jason Farmer	Challenger	13
Citroën C3 Rally2	(Chile) Benjamin Israel	Challenger	(Argentina) Matias Ramos	Challenger	11
Citroën C3 Rally2	(United States) Sean Johnston	Challenger	(United States) Alex Kihurani	Challenger	1
Citroën C3 Rally2	(Greece) Chrisostomos Karellis	Challenger	(Greece) Elias Panagiotounis	Challenger	10
Citroën C3 Rally2	(France) Stéphane Lefebvre		(France) Andy Malfoy		1
Citroën C3 Rally2	(Chile) Germán Lyon	Challenger	(Chile) Sebastian Vera	Challenger	11
Citroën C3 Rally2	(Portugal) Nuno Pinto	Challenger	(Portugal) João Jardim Pereira	Challenger	5
Citroën C3 Rally2	(Chile) Emilio Rosselot	Challenger	(Chile) Tomas Cañete	Challenger	11
Citroën C3 Rally2	(Chile) Gerardo V. Rosselot	Challenger	(Argentina) Marcelo Brizio	Challenger	11
Citroën C3 Rally2	(Portugal) Bernardo Sousa	Challenger	(Portugal) Inês Veiga	Challenger	5
Ford Fiesta R5	(Kenya) Karan Patel	Challenger	(Kenya) Tauseef Khan	Challenger	7
Ford Fiesta R5	(Netherlands) Henk Vossen	Challenger	(Netherlands) Annemieke Hulzebos	Challenger	1
Ford Fiesta R5	(Greece) George Vassilakis	Challenger	(Greece) Nikos Intzoglou	Challenger	10
Ford Fiesta Rally2	(Qatar) Nasser Khalifa Al-Attiyah	Challenger	(Italy) Giovanni Bernacchini	Challenger	5–6
Ford Fiesta Rally2	(Czech Republic) Martin Prokop	Challenger	(Czech Republic) Michal Ernst	Challenger	3, 6, 10
Ford Fiesta Rally2	(Czech Republic) Martin Prokop	Challenger	(Czech Republic) Zdeněk Jůrka	Challenger	7
Ford Fiesta Rally2	(Portugal) Lucas Simões	Challenger	(Portugal) Nuno Almeida	Challenger	5
Ford Fiesta Rally2	(Italy) Francesco Tali	Challenger	(Italy) Chiara Corso	Challenger	6
Ford Fiesta Rally2	(Estonia) Robert Virves	Challenger	(Portugal) Hugo Magalhães	Challenger	6
Ford Fiesta Rally2	(Estonia) Robert Virves	Challenger	(United Kingdom) Craig Drew	Challenger	8–10
Ford Fiesta Rally2	(Netherlands) Henk Vossen	Challenger	(Netherlands) Radboud van Hoek	Challenger	12
Hyundai i20 N Rally2	(Greece) Lambros Athanassoulas	Challenger	(Greece) Nikolaos Zakheos	Challenger	10
Hyundai i20 N Rally2	(Switzerland) Olivier Burri		(France) Anderson Levratti		1
Hyundai i20 N Rally2	(Estonia) Gregor Jeets	Challenger	(Estonia) Timo Taniel	Challenger	5–6
Hyundai i20 N Rally2	(Estonia) Georg Linnamäe	Challenger	(United Kingdom) James Morgan	Challenger	2, 4–5, 8–10, 12
Hyundai i20 N Rally2	(Spain) Pepe López	Challenger	(Spain) Borja Rozada	Challenger	1
Hyundai i20 N Rally2	(United Kingdom) Kris Meeke		(Republic of Ireland) James Fulton		5
Hyundai i20 N Rally2	(Portugal) Pedro Meireles	Challenger	(Portugal) Pedro Alves	Challenger	5
Hyundai i20 N Rally2	(France) Frédéric Rosati		(France) Philippe Marchetto		1
Hyundai i20 N Rally2	(Czech Republic) Jan Skála	Challenger	(Czech Republic) Jiří Skořepa	Challenger	12
Hyundai i20 N Rally2	(Finland) Riku Tahko	Challenger	(Finland) Markus Soininen	Challenger	9
Hyundai i20 N Rally2	(Portugal) Ricardo Teodósio	Challenger	(Portugal) José Teixeira	Challenger	5
Hyundai i20 N Rally2	(Paraguay) Miguel Zaldivar Sr.		(Argentina) José Luis Díaz		2, 5–6
Škoda Fabia R5	(Italy) Giuseppe Dettori	Challenger	(Italy) Carlo Pisano	Challenger	6
Škoda Fabia R5	(Czech Republic) Michal Horák	Challenger	(Czech Republic) Ivan Horák	Challenger	12
Škoda Fabia R5	(Finland) Jari Huttunen		(Finland) Antti Linnaketo		2
Škoda Fabia R5	(Finland) Tommi Jylhä	Challenger	(Finland) Kimmo Nevanpää	Challenger	9
Škoda Fabia R5	(Estonia) Kaspar Kasari	Challenger	(Estonia) Rainis Raidma	Challenger	8
Škoda Fabia R5	(Chile) Eduardo Kovacs	Challenger	(Argentina) Ruben Garcia	Challenger	11
Škoda Fabia R5	(Finland) Heikki Kovalainen	Challenger	(Japan) Sae Kitagawa	Challenger	13
Škoda Fabia R5	(Italy) Filippo Marchino	Challenger	(Italy) Pietro Elia Ometto	Challenger	1, 12
Škoda Fabia R5	(Chile) Jorge Martínez Fontena	Challenger	(Argentina) Alberto Alvarez Nicholson	Challenger	3
Škoda Fabia R5	(Italy) Maurizio Morato	Challenger	(Italy) Andrea Dal Maso	Challenger	6
Škoda Fabia R5	(Sweden) Joakim Roman	Challenger	(Sweden) Ida Lidebjer-Granberg	Challenger	2
Škoda Fabia R5	(Finland) Anssi Rytkönen	Challenger	(Finland) Juho-Ville Koskela	Challenger	9
Škoda Fabia R5	(Portugal) Diogo Salvi	Challenger	(Portugal) António Costa	Challenger	5
Škoda Fabia R5	(Kenya) Carl Tundo	Challenger	(Kenya) Tim Jessop	Challenger	7
Škoda Fabia R5	(Kenya) Aakif Virani	Challenger	(Kenya) Azhar Bhatti	Challenger	7
Škoda Fabia R5	(Czech Republic) Štěpán Vojtěch	Challenger	(Czech Republic) Michal Ernst	Challenger	12
Škoda Fabia R5	(Greece) Marios Xanthakos	Challenger	(Greece) Nikos Karathanassis	Challenger	10
Škoda Fabia Rally2 evo	(Portugal) Pedro Almeida	Challenger	(Portugal) Mário Castro	Challenger	5
Škoda Fabia Rally2 evo	(Portugal) Armindo Araújo	Challenger	(Portugal) Luís Ramalho	Challenger	5
Škoda Fabia Rally2 evo	(Italy) Fabrizio Arengi	Challenger	(Italy) Massimiliano Bosi	Challenger	1–2
Škoda Fabia Rally2 evo	(Italy) Pablo Biolghini	Challenger	(Italy) Stefano Pudda	Challenger	6
Škoda Fabia Rally2 evo	(Italy) Lorenzo Bontempelli		(Italy) Giovanni Pina		1
Škoda Fabia Rally2 evo	(Czech Republic) Adam Březík	Challenger	(Czech Republic) Ondřej Krajča	Challenger	12
Škoda Fabia Rally2 evo	(Bolivia) Bruno Bulacia	Challenger	(Spain) Axel Coronado	Challenger	2, 5–6, 8, 11
Škoda Fabia Rally2 evo	(Peru) Eduardo Castro	Challenger	(Argentina) Fernando Mussano	Challenger	3, 5–6
Škoda Fabia Rally2 evo	(Poland) Daniel Chwist	Challenger	(Poland) Kamil Heller	Challenger	3, 6, 13
Škoda Fabia Rally2 evo	(Italy) Luciano Cobbe		(Italy) Roberto Mometti		2, 5, 8–9
Škoda Fabia Rally2 evo	(Portugal) Miguel Correia	Challenger	(Portugal) Jorge Eduardo Carvalho	Challenger	5
Škoda Fabia Rally2 evo	(Italy) Carlo Covi	Challenger	(Italy) Andrea Budoia	Challenger	6
Škoda Fabia Rally2 evo	(Spain) Miguel Díaz-Aboitiz	Challenger	(Spain) Rodolfo del Barrio	Challenger	2
Škoda Fabia Rally2 evo	(Spain) Miguel Díaz-Aboitiz	Challenger	(Spain) Rodrigo Sanjuan de Eusebio	Challenger	5, 7, 9
Škoda Fabia Rally2 evo	(Spain) Miguel Díaz-Aboitiz	Challenger	(Spain) Diego Sanjaun de Eusebio	Challenger	10
Škoda Fabia Rally2 evo	(Chile) Emilio Fernández	Challenger	(Spain) Borja Rozada	Challenger	5, 8
Škoda Fabia Rally2 evo	(Chile) Emilio Fernández	Challenger	(Spain) Borja Odriozola	Challenger	9
Škoda Fabia Rally2 evo	(Japan) Osamu Fukunaga	Challenger	(Japan) Misako Saida	Challenger	13
Škoda Fabia Rally2 evo	(Italy) Matteo Gamba	Challenger	(Italy) Nicolò Gonella	Challenger	6, 12
Škoda Fabia Rally2 evo	(India) Gaurav Gill	Challenger	(France) Florian Barral	Challenger	10
Škoda Fabia Rally2 evo	(Hungary) Norbert Herczig	Challenger	(Hungary) Ramón Ferencz	Challenger	4–6
Škoda Fabia Rally2 evo	(United Kingdom) Chris Ingram	Challenger	(United Kingdom) Craig Drew	Challenger	1
Škoda Fabia Rally2 evo	(Sweden) Jörgen Jonasson		(Sweden) Nicklas Jonasson		2
Škoda Fabia Rally2 evo	(Finland) Lauri Joona	Challenger	(Finland) Tuukka Shemeikka	Challenger	2, 5–6
Škoda Fabia Rally2 evo	(Poland) Kajetan Kajetanowicz	Challenger	(Poland) Maciej Szczepaniak	Challenger	3, 7
Škoda Fabia Rally2 evo	(Estonia) Egon Kaur	Challenger	(Estonia) Jakko Viilo	Challenger	2
Škoda Fabia Rally2 evo	(Austria) Johannes Keferböck		(Austria) Ilka Minor		1, 6
Škoda Fabia Rally2 evo	(Greece) Giorgos Kehagias	Challenger	(Greece) Christos Kouzionis	Challenger	10
Škoda Fabia Rally2 evo	(Estonia) Priit Koik	Challenger	(Estonia) Kristo Tamm	Challenger	8
Škoda Fabia Rally2 evo	(Finland) Roope Korhonen	Challenger	(Finland) Anssi Viinikka	Challenger	12
Škoda Fabia Rally2 evo	(Germany) Armin Kremer	Challenger	(Germany) Timo Gottschalk	Challenger	7
Škoda Fabia Rally2 evo	(Chile) Jorge Martínez Fontena	Challenger	(Argentina) Alberto Alvarez Nicholson	Challenger	8
Škoda Fabia Rally2 evo	(Italy) Christian Merli	Challenger	(Italy) Marco Zortea	Challenger	1
Škoda Fabia Rally2 evo	(Italy) Mauro Miele	Challenger	(Italy) Luca Beltrame	Challenger	2
Škoda Fabia Rally2 evo	(Italy) Simone Niboli	Challenger	(Italy) Battista Brunetti	Challenger	1
Škoda Fabia Rally2 evo	(Italy) Enrico Oldrati	Challenger	(Italy) Elia De Guio	Challenger	5
Škoda Fabia Rally2 evo	(Italy) Silvano Patera		(Italy) Stefano Tiraboschi		1
Škoda Fabia Rally2 evo	(Greece) Yorgo Philippedes	Challenger	(United Kingdom) Stuart Loudon	Challenger	10
Škoda Fabia Rally2 evo	(Austria) Martin Roßgatterer	Challenger	(Austria) Jürgen Heigl	Challenger	12
Škoda Fabia Rally2 evo	(Kenya) Samman Singh Vohra	Challenger	(Kenya) Alfir Khan	Challenger	7
Škoda Fabia Rally2 evo	(Italy) Nicola Tali	Challenger	(Italy) Massimiliano Frau	Challenger	6
Škoda Fabia Rally2 evo	(Portugal) Francisco Teixeira	Challenger	(Portugal) João Serôdio	Challenger	5
Škoda Fabia Rally2 evo	(Greece) Vassileios Velanis	Challenger	(Greece) Ioannis Velanis	Challenger	10
Škoda Fabia Rally2 evo	(Spain) Alexander Villanueva		(Spain) José Murado González		2, 5–6
Škoda Fabia Rally2 evo	(Spain) Alexander Villanueva	Challenger	(Spain) José Murado González	Challenger	13
Škoda Fabia Rally2 evo	(Netherlands) Henk Vossen	Challenger	(Netherlands) Radboud van Hoek	Challenger	4
Škoda Fabia RS Rally2	(Saudi Arabia) Rakan Al-Rashed	Challenger	(Australia) Dale Moscatt	Challenger	2, 5
Škoda Fabia RS Rally2	(Bolivia) Bruno Bulacia	Challenger	(Spain) Axel Coronado	Challenger	9
Škoda Fabia RS Rally2	(Czech Republic) Erik Cais	Challenger	(Czech Republic) Petr Těšínský	Challenger	1, 4–6
Škoda Fabia RS Rally2	(Czech Republic) Erik Cais	Challenger	(Czech Republic) Daniel Trunkát	Challenger	12
Škoda Fabia RS Rally2	(France) Nicolas Ciamin	Challenger	(France) Yannick Roche	Challenger	12
Škoda Fabia RS Rally2	(Poland) Daniel Chwist	Challenger	(Poland) Kamil Heller	Challenger	7
Škoda Fabia RS Rally2	(France) François Delecour		(France) Sabrina De Castelli		1
Škoda Fabia RS Rally2	(Spain) Miguel Díaz-Aboitiz	Challenger	(Spain) Rodrigo Sanjuan de Eusebio	Challenger	12–13
Škoda Fabia RS Rally2	(Japan) Osamu Fukunaga	Challenger	(Japan) Misako Saida	Challenger	12
Škoda Fabia RS Rally2	(United Kingdom) Gus Greensmith		(Sweden) Jonas Andersson		3
Škoda Fabia RS Rally2	(Finland) Mikko Heikkilä	Challenger	(Finland) Samu Vaaleri	Challenger	9
Škoda Fabia RS Rally2	(Finland) Jari Huttunen		(Finland) Antti Haapala		9
Škoda Fabia RS Rally2	(Finland) Lauri Joona	Challenger	(Finland) Tuukka Shemeikka	Challenger	9–10, 12
Škoda Fabia RS Rally2	(Poland) Kajetan Kajetanowicz	Challenger	(Poland) Maciej Szczepaniak	Challenger	6, 10–13
Škoda Fabia RS Rally2	(Estonia) Egon Kaur	Challenger	(Estonia) Jakko Viilo	Challenger	8
Škoda Fabia RS Rally2	(Austria) Johannes Keferböck	Challenger	(Austria) Ilka Minor	Challenger	4, 12
Škoda Fabia RS Rally2	(Germany) Armin Kremer	Challenger	(Germany) Ella Kremer	Challenger	4, 8, 12
Škoda Fabia RS Rally2	(Germany) Armin Kremer	Challenger	(Germany) Timo Gottschalk	Challenger	5–6
Škoda Fabia RS Rally2	(Poland) Mikołaj Marczyk	Challenger	(Poland) Szymon Gospodarczyk	Challenger	5–6, 8–10
Škoda Fabia RS Rally2	(Poland) Mikołaj Marczyk	Challenger	(Poland) Daniel Dymurski	Challenger	12
Škoda Fabia RS Rally2	(Chile) Jorge Martínez Fontena	Challenger	(Argentina) Alberto Alvarez Nicholson	Challenger	11
Škoda Fabia RS Rally2	(Italy) Mauro Miele	Challenger	(Italy) Luca Beltrame	Challenger	1, 4, 6, 8–9
Škoda Fabia RS Rally2	(Greece) Panagiotis Roustemis	Challenger	(Greece) Nikolaos Petropoulos	Challenger	10
Škoda Fabia RS Rally2	(Argentina) Martin Scuncio	Challenger	(Chile) Javiera Roman	Challenger	11
Škoda Fabia RS Rally2	(Sweden) Oliver Solberg		(United Kingdom) Elliott Edmondson		2–3, 5–6, 8, 10–11
Škoda Fabia RS Rally2	(Poland) Michał Sołowow		(Poland) Maciej Baran		2
Škoda Fabia RS Rally2	(Spain) Alexander Villanueva	Challenger	(Spain) José Murado González	Challenger	8–10
Škoda Fabia RS Rally2	(Germany) Albert von Thurn und Taxis	Challenger	(Germany) Jara Hain	Challenger	12
Škoda Fabia RS Rally2	(Austria) Simon Wagner	Challenger	(Austria) Gerald Winter	Challenger	12
Volkswagen Polo GTI R5	(Norway) Ole Christian Veiby		(Norway) Torstein Eriksen		2
Volkswagen Polo GTI R5	(France) Nicolas Ciamin	Challenger	(France) Yannick Roche	Challenger	4, 6, 9
Volkswagen Polo GTI R5	(Finland) Roope Korhonen	Challenger	(Finland) Anssi Viinikka	Challenger	9
Volkswagen Polo GTI R5	(Greece) Alexandros Tsouloftas	Challenger	(Cyprus) Stelios Elia	Challenger	10

== Regulation changes ==
The 2022 junior championships of the class, WRC-2 Junior, were renamed as WRC-2 Challenger to focus on the experience of the competitors instead of age, while the Masters series was opened to Rally2, Rally3, Rally4, Rally5 and R-GT competitors under the WRC framework, ceasing to be based on WRC2.

== Results and standings ==
=== Season summary ===
Round	Event	Winning driver	Winning co-driver	Winning entrant	Winning time	Report	Ref.
1	(Monaco) Rallye Automobile Monte Carlo	(France) Yohan Rossel	(France) Arnaud Dunand	(France) PH Sport	3:22:05.4	Report	
2	Rally Sweden	(Sweden) Oliver Solberg	(United Kingdom) Elliot Edmondson	(Sweden) Oliver Solberg	2:33:42.6	Report	
3	(Mexico) Rally Guanajuato México	(United Kingdom) Gus Greensmith	(Sweden) Jonas Andersson	(United Kingdom) Gus Greensmith	3:28:40.9	Report	
4	Croatia Rally	(France) Yohan Rossel	(France) Arnaud Dunand	(France) PH Sport	2:58:45.6	Report	
5	Rally de Portugal	(United Kingdom) Gus Greensmith	(Sweden) Jonas Andersson	(Germany) Toksport WRT 3	3:44:55.1	Report	
6	(Italy) Rally Italia Sardegna	(Norway) Andreas Mikkelsen	(Norway) Torstein Eriksen	(Germany) Toksport WRT 3	3:49:34.7	Report	
7	Safari Rally Kenya	(Poland) Kajetan Kajetanowicz	(Poland) Maciej Szczepaniak	(Poland) Kajetan Kajetanowicz	3:57:15.9	Report	
8	Rally Estonia	(Norway) Andreas Mikkelsen	(Norway) Torstein Eriksen	(Germany) Toksport WRT 3	2:45:57.3	Report	
9	Rally Finland	(Finland) Sami Pajari	(Finland) Enni Mälkönen	(Germany) Toksport WRT 2	2:43:15.0	Report	
10	Acropolis Rally Greece	(Norway) Andreas Mikkelsen	(Norway) Torstein Eriksen	(Germany) Toksport WRT 3	3:09:57.7	Report	
11	Rally Chile	(Sweden) Oliver Solberg	(United Kingdom) Elliot Edmondson	(Sweden) Oliver Solberg	3:14:56.6	Report	
12	(Europe) Central European Rally	(France) Nicolas Ciamin	(France) Yannick Roche	(France) Nicolas Ciamin	3:04:33.0	Report	
13	Rally Japan	(Norway) Andreas Mikkelsen	(Norway) Torstein Eriksen	(Germany) Toksport WRT 3	3:39:42.5	Report	

=== Scoring system ===
Points are awarded to the top ten classified finishers in each event. Power Stage points are also awarded in the drivers' and co-drivers' championships, with three points awarded to the first place finisher on the stage, two to second place, and one to third. A team has to enter two cars to score points in an event. Drivers and teams must nominate a scoring rally when they enter the event and the best six scores from seven nominated rallies will count towards the final classification. Registered drivers are able to enter additional rallies with Priority 2 status without scoring points.

Position	1st	2nd	3rd	4th	5th	6th	7th	8th	9th	10th
Points	25	18	15	12	10	8	6	4	2	1

=== FIA WRC2 Championship for Drivers ===
Pos.	Driver	MON (Monaco)	SWE (Sweden)	MEX (Mexico)	CRO (Croatia)	POR (Portugal)	ITA (Note: No Power Stage points were awarded for WRC-2 as the Power Stage was interrupted before all competitors could complete the stage.) (Italy)	KEN (Kenya)	EST (Estonia)	FIN (Finland)	GRE (Greece)	CHL (Chile)	EUR (Europe)	JPN (Japan)	Points
1	(Norway) Andreas Mikkelsen					3^{2}	1		1^{2}	4^{3}	1^{3}		13^{1}	1^{3}	134
2	(United Kingdom) Gus Greensmith			1^{3}	6^{1}	1	Ret		Ret	Ret	2	2^{3}	4		111
3	(France) Yohan Rossel	1^{1}			1	4	4			NC	3	4	Ret		104
4	Nikolay Gryazin	2^{2}	NC	Ret	2	NC	21			3^{2}	NC	5	6^{2}	2^{1}	96
5	(Poland) Kajetan Kajetanowicz			4			3	1^{1}			6	Ret	3	3^{2}	95
6	(Sweden) Oliver Solberg	NC	1^{1}	3	NC	2^{1}	26	NC	16	NC	Ret	1^{2}			91
7	(Finland) Sami Pajari	DNS	3		5	NC	19		2^{1}	1	Ret	3	NC		86
8	(France) Adrien Fourmaux	5		7^{1}	4^{2}	10^{3}	Ret			2	4^{2}		NC		67
9	(Finland) Emil Lindholm		7^{2}	2^{2}	3^{3}		Ret		3	13^{1}		Ret	Ret		62
10	(Poland) Mikołaj Marczyk					9	5		5^{3}	7	9		5		41
11	(Czech Republic) Erik Cais	4			16	23	6						2		38
12	(Finland) Teemu Suninen		6			5	2								36
13	(Czech Republic) Martin Prokop			5			9	2^{2}			8				36
14	(Bolivia) Marco Bulacia	7	5			6			4	Ret	12	Ret			36
15	(France) Nicolas Ciamin				Ret		20			10			1^{3}		27
16	(Poland) Daniel Chwist			8			22	5						5	24
17	(Luxembourg) Grégoire Munster	8			11	27	7	Ret		9	5			Ret	22
18	(Finland) Lauri Joona		8			11	8			8	7^{1}		WD		21
19	(Estonia) Georg Linnamäe		4		13	26	NC		17	6	Ret		Ret		20
20	(Germany) Armin Kremer				7	Ret	Ret	4^{3}	19				10		20
21	(Norway) Ole Christian Veiby		2^{3}												19
22	(Spain) Pepe López	3													15
23	(Kenya) Carl Tundo							3							15
24	(Chile) Jorge Martínez Fontena			6					18			9^{1}			13
25	(Japan) Osamu Fukunaga												Ret	4	12
26	(Republic of Ireland) Josh McErlean	22				7	10		8	12			19		11
27	(Finland) Mikko Heikkilä									5					10
28	(Estonia) Robert Virves		9			Ret	12		6	Ret	Ret				10
29	(Republic of Ireland) Eamonn Boland	Ret			12								Ret	6	8
30	(United Kingdom) Chris Ingram	6													8
31	(Kenya) Samman Singh Vohra							6							8
32	(Chile) Emilio Rosselot											6			8
33	(Estonia) Egon Kaur		11						7						6
34	(Spain) Miguel Díaz-Aboitiz		17			Ret		Ret		18	13		18	7	6
35	(Chile) Pedro Heller											7			6
36	(Austria) Simon Wagner												7		6
37	(Paraguay) Fabrizio Zaldivar		15			Ret	16		14	Ret		8	9		6
38	(Chile) Emilio Fernández					8			Ret	11		10			5
39	(Hungary) Norbert Herczig				8	Ret									4
40	(Czech Republic) Adam Březík												8		4
41	(Japan) Satoshi Imai													8	4
42	(France) Stéphane Lefebvre	9^{3}													3
43	(Austria) Johannes Keferböck	14			9		14				WD		14		2
44	(Peru) Eduardo Castro			9		Ret	15								2
45	(Estonia) Kaspar Kasari								9						2
46	(Bolivia) Bruno Bulacia		10			18	Ret		10	Ret		11			2
47	(Spain) Alejandro Cachón	11			15	13	Ret		WD		10		16		1
48	(Republic of Ireland) Patrick O'Brien				10		28								1
49	(France) François Delecour	10													1
Pos.	Driver	MON (Monaco)	SWE (Sweden)	MEX (Mexico)	CRO (Croatia)	POR (Portugal)	ITA (Italy)	KEN (Kenya)	EST (Estonia)	FIN (Finland)	GRE (Greece)	CHL (Chile)	EUR (Europe)	JPN (Japan)	Points

Key
Colour	Result
Gold	Winner
Silver	2nd place
Bronze	3rd place
Green	Points finish
Blue	Non-points finish
Blue	Non-classified finish (NC)
Purple	Did not finish (Ret)
Black	Excluded (EX)
Black	Disqualified (DSQ)
White	Did not start (DNS)
White	Cancelled (C)
Blank	Withdrew entry from the event (WD)

Notes:
^{1 2 3} – Power Stage position

=== FIA WRC2 Championship for Co-Drivers ===
Pos.	Driver	MON (Monaco)	SWE (Sweden)	MEX (Mexico)	CRO (Croatia)	POR (Portugal)	ITA (Italy)	KEN (Kenya)	EST (Estonia)	FIN (Finland)	GRE (Greece)	CHL (Chile)	EUR (Europe)	JPN (Japan)	Points
1	(Norway) Torstein Eriksen		2^{3}			3^{2}	1		1^{2}	4^{1}	1^{3}		13^{1}	NC	127
2	(Sweden) Jonas Andersson			1^{3}	6^{1}	1	Ret		Ret	Ret	2	2^{3}	4		111
3	(France) Arnaud Dunand	1^{1}			1	4	4			NC	3	4	Ret		104
4	Konstantin Aleksandrov	2^{2}	NC	Ret	2	NC	21			3^{2}	NC	5	6^{2}	1^{1}	103
5	(Poland) Maciej Szczepaniak			4			3	1^{1}			6	Ret	3	2^{2}	98
6	(United Kingdom) Elliott Edmondson	NC	1^{1}	3	NC	2^{1}	26	NC	16	NC	Ret	1^{2}			91
7	(Finland) Enni Mälkönen	DNS	3		5	NC	19		2^{1}	1	Ret	3	Ret		86
8	(France) Alexandre Coria	5		7^{1}	4^{2}	10^{3}	Ret			2	4^{2}		NC		67
9	(Finland) Reeta Hämäläinen		7^{2}	2^{2}	3^{3}		Ret		3	13^{1}		Ret	Ret		62
10	(Finland) Mikko Markkula		6			5	2								36
11	(Poland) Szymon Gospodarczyk					9	5		5^{3}	7	9				31
12	(Spain) Diego Vallejo		5			6			4	Ret	12	Ret			30
13	(France) Yannick Roche				Ret		20			10			1^{3}		27
14	(Poland) Kamil Heller			8			22	5						4	26
15	(Belgium) Louis Louka	8			11	27	7	Ret		9	5			Ret	22
16	(Finland) Tuukka Shemeikka		8			11	8			8	7^{1}		WD		21
17	(Czech Republic) Zdeněk Jůrka							2^{2}							20
18	(Spain) Borja Rozada	3				8			Ret			10			20
19	(United Kingdom) James Morgan		4		13	26	NC		17	6	Ret		Ret		20
20	(Czech Republic) Petr Těšínský	4			16	23	6								20
21	(Czech Republic) Daniel Trunkát												2		18
22	(Japan) Misako Saida												Ret	3^{3}	16
23	(Czech Republic) Michal Ernst			5			9				8		11		16
24	(United Kingdom) Craig Drew	6							6	Ret	Ret				16
25	(Kenya) Tim Jessop							3							15
26	(Germany) Timo Gottschalk					Ret	Ret	4^{3}							13
27	(Argentina) Alberto Alvarez Nicholson			6					18			9^{1}			13
28	(Republic of Ireland) Michael Joseph Morrissey	Ret			12								Ret	5	10
29	(Finland) Samu Vaaleri									5					10
30	(Poland) Daniel Dymurski												5		10
31	(Spain) Rodrigo Sanjuan de Eusebio					Ret		Ret		18			18	6	8
32	(Kenya) Alfir Khan							6							8
33	(Chile) Tomas Cañete											6			8
34	(Spain) Axel Coronado	7	10			18	Ret		10	Ret		11			8
35	(Germany) Ella Kremer				7				19				10		7
36	(Republic of Ireland) John Rowan	22				7	10								7
37	(Estonia) Jakko Viilo		11						7						6
38	(Argentina) Pablo Olmos											7			6
39	(Austria) Gerald Winter												7		6
40	(Italy) Marcelo Der Ohannesian		15			Ret	16		14	Ret		8	9		6
41	(New Zealand) Jason Farmer													7	6
42	(Republic of Ireland) James Fulton					Ret			8	12			19		4
43	(Hungary) Ramón Ferencz				8	Ret									4
44	(Czech Republic) Ondřej Krajča												8		4
45	(France) Andy Malfoy	9^{3}													3
46	(Portugal) Hugo Magalhães		9			Ret	12				WD				2
47	(Austria) Ilka Minor	14			9		14				WD		14		2
48	(Argentina) Fernando Mussano			9		Ret	15								2
49	(Estonia) Rainis Raidma								9						2
50	(Spain) Alejandro López Fernández	11	Ret		15	13	Ret		WD		10		16		1
51	(Republic of Ireland) Stephen O'Brien				10		28								1
52	(France) Sabrina De Castelli	10													1
Pos.	Driver	MON (Monaco)	SWE (Sweden)	MEX (Mexico)	CRO (Croatia)	POR (Portugal)	ITA (Italy)	KEN (Kenya)	EST (Estonia)	FIN (Finland)	GRE (Greece)	CHL (Chile)	EUR (Europe)	JPN (Japan)	Points

Key
Colour	Result
Gold	Winner
Silver	2nd place
Bronze	3rd place
Green	Points finish
Blue	Non-points finish
Blue	Non-classified finish (NC)
Purple	Did not finish (Ret)
Black	Excluded (EX)
Black	Disqualified (DSQ)
White	Did not start (DNS)
White	Cancelled (C)
Blank	Withdrew entry from the event (WD)

Notes:
^{1 2 3} – Power Stage position

=== FIA WRC2 Championship for Teams ===
Pos.	Team	MON (Monaco)	SWE (Sweden)	MEX (Mexico)	CRO (Croatia)	POR (Portugal)	ITA (Italy)	KEN (Kenya)	EST (Estonia)	FIN (Finland)	GRE (Greece)	CHL (Chile)	EUR (Europe)	JPN (Japan)	Points Dropped	Total Points
1	(Germany) Toksport WRT 3					1	1		1	4	1		2	1	12	207
1	(Germany) Toksport WRT 3					2	Ret		Ret	Ret	2		5	2	12	207
2	(Germany) Toksport WRT 2	1		1						1	5	2	1		0	188
2	(Germany) Toksport WRT 2	3		Ret						3	Ret	3	3		0	188
3	(Germany) Toksport WRT		1		1				2			1			0	135
3	(Germany) Toksport WRT		3		3				4			Ret			0	135
4	(United Kingdom) M-Sport Ford WRT	2			2	5	3	Ret		2	3				15	131
4	(United Kingdom) M-Sport Ford WRT	4			4	7	Ret	Ret		5	4				15	131
5	(South Korea) Hyundai Motorsport N		2			3	2		3	7		4	4		6	122
5	(South Korea) Hyundai Motorsport N		4			Ret	5		5	Ret		Ret	Ret		6	122
6	(Republic of Ireland) Motorsport Ireland Rally Academy	5				4	4			6					0	70
6	(Republic of Ireland) Motorsport Ireland Rally Academy	6				6	6			8					0	70
Pos.	Team	MON (Monaco)	SWE (Sweden)	MEX (Mexico)	CRO (Croatia)	POR (Portugal)	ITA (Italy)	KEN (Kenya)	EST (Estonia)	FIN (Finland)	GRE (Greece)	CHL (Chile)	EUR (Europe)	JPN (Japan)	Points Dropped	Total Points

Key
Colour	Result
Gold	Winner
Silver	2nd place
Bronze	3rd place
Green	Points finish
Blue	Non-points finish
Blue	Non-classified finish (NC)
Purple	Did not finish (Ret)
Black	Excluded (EX)
Black	Disqualified (DSQ)
White	Did not start (DNS)
White	Cancelled (C)
Blank	Withdrew entry from the event (WD)

=== FIA WRC2 Challenger Championship for Drivers ===
Pos.	Driver	MON (Monaco)	SWE (Sweden)	MEX (Mexico)	CRO (Croatia)	POR (Portugal)	ITA (Italy)	KEN (Kenya)	EST (Estonia)	FIN (Finland)	GRE (Greece)	CHL (Chile)	EUR (Europe)	JPN (Japan)	Points
1	(Poland) Kajetan Kajetanowicz			1			1	1			2	Ret	3	2	126
2	Nikolay Gryazin	1	NC	Ret	1	NC	18			2	NC	2	5	1	121
3	(Finland) Sami Pajari	DNS	1		2	NC	16		1	1	Ret	1			118
4	(Poland) Mikołaj Marczyk					4	2		3	5	5		4		77
5	(Bolivia) Marco Bulacia	5	3			1			2	Ret	8	Ret			72
6	(Luxembourg) Grégoire Munster	6			7	21	4	Ret		7	1				57
7	(Czech Republic) Martin Prokop			2			6	2			4				56
8	(Finland) Lauri Joona		4			5	5			6	3		WD		55
9	(Czech Republic) Erik Cais	3			12	17	3						2		48
10	(Poland) Daniel Chwist			4			19	5						4	34
11	(Republic of Ireland) Josh McErlean	15			WD	2	7		6	10			17		33
12	(Estonia) Georg Linnamäe		2		9	20			14	4	Ret		Ret		32
13	(France) Nicolas Ciamin						17			8			1		29
14	(Germany) Armin Kremer				3	Ret	Ret	4	16				9		29
15	(Estonia) Robert Virves		5			Ret	9		4	Ret	Ret				24
16	(Chile) Jorge Martínez Fontena			3					15			6			23
17	(Chile) Emilio Fernández					3			Ret	9		7			23
18	(Spain) Alejandro Cachón	7			11	7	Ret		WD		6		14		20
19	(Spain) Pepe López	2													18
20	(Paraguay) Fabrizio Zaldivar		8			Ret	13		12	Ret		5	8		18
21	(Estonia) Egon Kaur		7						5						16
22	(Bolivia) Bruno Bulacia		6			12	Ret		8	Ret		8			16
23	(Japan) Osamu Fukunaga												Ret	3	15
24	(Kenya) Carl Tundo							3							15
25	(Finland) Mikko Heikkilä									3					15
26	(Chile) Emilio Rosselot											3			15
27	(Republic of Ireland) Eamonn Boland				8									5	14
28	(Hungary) Norbert Herczig				4	Ret	DNS								12
29	(United Kingdom) Chris Ingram	4													12
30	(Chile) Pedro Heller											4			12
31	(Spain) Miguel Díaz-Aboitiz		10			Ret		Ret		15	9		16	6	11
32	(Peru) Eduardo Castro			5		Ret	12								10
33	(Austria) Johannes Keferböck	NC			5		11				WD		12		10
34	(Republic of Ireland) Patrick O'Brien				6		24								8
35	(Portugal) Armindo Araújo					6									8
36	(Kenya) Samman Singh Vohra							6							8
37	(Austria) Simon Wagner												6		8
38	(Estonia) Kaspar Kasari								7						6
39	(Greece) Chrisostomos Karellis										7				6
40	(Czech Republic) Adam Březík												7		6
41	(Japan) Satoshi Imai													7	6
42	(Spain) Alexander Villanueva					8	20		9	17	Ret				6
43	(Italy) Mauro Miele	8	Ret		Ret		14		11	WD					4
44	(Italy) Matteo Gamba						8						Ret		4
45	(Saudi Arabia) Rakan Al-Rashed		9			16					DNS				2
46	(Italy) Christian Merli	9													2
47	(Italy) Enrico Oldrati					9									2
48	(Chile) Gerardo V. Rosselot											9			2
49	(Netherlands) Henk Vossen	14			10								19		1
50	(Greece) George Vassilakis							Ret			10				1
51	(Italy) Simone Niboli	10													1
52	(Portugal) Nuno Pinto					10									1
53	(Italy) Nicola Tali						10								1
54	(Estonia) Priit Koik								10						1
55	(Chile) Eduardo Kovacs											10			1
56	(Netherlands) Henk Vossen												10		1
Pos.	Driver	MON (Monaco)	SWE (Sweden)	MEX (Mexico)	CRO (Croatia)	POR (Portugal)	ITA (Italy)	KEN (Kenya)	EST (Estonia)	FIN (Finland)	GRE (Greece)	CHL (Chile)	EUR (Europe)	JPN (Japan)	Points

Key
Colour	Result
Gold	Winner
Silver	2nd place
Bronze	3rd place
Green	Points finish
Blue	Non-points finish
Blue	Non-classified finish (NC)
Purple	Did not finish (Ret)
Black	Excluded (EX)
Black	Disqualified (DSQ)
White	Did not start (DNS)
White	Cancelled (C)
Blank	Withdrew entry from the event (WD)

=== FIA WRC2 Challenger Championship for Co-Drivers ===
Pos.	Driver	MON (Monaco)	SWE (Sweden)	MEX (Mexico)	CRO (Croatia)	POR (Portugal)	ITA (Italy)	KEN (Kenya)	EST (Estonia)	FIN (Finland)	GRE (Greece)	CHL (Chile)	EUR (Europe)	JPN (Japan)	Points
1	(Poland) Maciej Szczepaniak			1			1	1			2	Ret	3	2	126
2	Konstantin Aleksandrov	1	NC	Ret	1	NC	18			2	NC	2	5	1	121
3	(Finland) Enni Mälkönen	DNS	1		2	NC	16		1	1	Ret	1			118
4	(Poland) Szymon Gospodarczyk					4	2		3	5	5				65
5	(Spain) Diego Vallejo		3			1			2	Ret	8				62
6	(Belgium) Louis Louka	6			7	21	4	Ret		7	1				57
7	(Finland) Tuukka Shemeikka		4			5	5			6	3				55
8	(Spain) Borja Rozada	2				3			Ret			7			39
9	(Czech Republic) Michal Ernst			2			6				4		10		39
10	(Poland) Kamil Heller			4			19	5						4	34
11	(United Kingdom) James Morgan		2		9	20			14	4	Ret		Ret		32
12	(Czech Republic) Petr Těšínský	3			12	17	3								30
13	(France) Yannick Roche						17			8			1		29
14	(Republic of Ireland) John Rowan	15			WD	2	7								24
15	(United Kingdom) Craig Drew	4							4	Ret	Ret				24
16	(Argentina) Alberto Alvarez Nicholson			3					15			6			23
17	(Spain) Axel Coronado	5	6			12	Ret		8	Ret					22
18	(Spain) Alejandro López Fernández	7			11	7	Ret		WD		6		14		20
19	(Czech Republic) Zdeněk Jůrka							2							18
20	(Czech Republic) Daniel Trunkát												2		18
21	(Argentina) Marcelo Der Ohannesian		8			Ret	13		12	Ret		5	8		18
22	(Germany) Ella Kremer				3				16				9		17
23	(Estonia) Jakko Viilo		7						5						16
24	(Japan) Misako Saida												Ret	3	15
25	(Kenya) Tim Jessop							3							15
26	(Finland) Samu Vaaleri									3					15
27	(Chile) Tomas Cañete											3			15
28	(Republic of Ireland) Michael Joseph Morrissey				8								Ret	5	14
29	(Chile) Tomas Cañete											4			12
30	(Germany) Timo Gottschalk					Ret	Ret	4							12
31	(Hungary) Ramón Ferencz				4	Ret	DNS								12
32	(Poland) Daniel Dymurski												4		12
33	(Portugal) Hugo Magalhães		5			Ret	9				DNS				12
34	(Argentina) Fernando Mussano			5		Ret	12								10
35	(Austria) Ilka Minor	NC			5		11				WD		12		10
36	(Republic of Ireland) James Fulton							6		10			17		9
37	(Spain) Rodrigo Sanjuan de Eusebio					Ret		Ret		15			16	6	8
38	(Republic of Ireland) Stephen O'Brien				6		24								8
39	(Portugal) Luís Ramalho					6									8
40	(Kenya) Alfir Khan							6							8
41	(Austria) Gerald Winter												6		8
42	(Estonia) Rainis Raidma								7						6
43	(Greece) Elias Panagiotounis										7				6
44	(Czech Republic) Ondřej Krajča												7		6
45	(New Zealand) Jason Farmer													7	6
46	(Spain) José Murado González					8	20		9	13	Ret			WD	6
47	(Italy) Luca Beltrame	8	Ret		Ret	14		13		WD					4
48	(Chile) José Luis Díaz					Ret	WD		WD			8			4
49	(Italy) Nicolò Gonella						8						Ret		4
50	(Australia) Dale Moscatt		9			16									2
51	(Italy) Marco Zortea	9													2
52	(Italy) Elia De Guio					9									2
53	(Spain) Borja Odriozola									9					2
54	(Spain) Rodrigo Sanjuan de Eusebio										9				2
55	(Argentina) Marcelo Brizio											9			2
56	(Netherlands) Radboud van Hoek				10								19		1
57	(Italy) Battista Brunetti	10													1
58	(Spain) Rodolfo del Barrio		10												1
59	(Portugal) João Jardim Pereira					10									1
60	(Italy) Massimiliano Frau						10								1
61	(Estonia) Kristo Tamm								10						1
62	(Greece) Nikos Intzoglou										10				1
63	(Argentina) Ruben Garcia											10			1
Pos.	Driver	MON (Monaco)	SWE (Sweden)	MEX (Mexico)	CRO (Croatia)	POR (Portugal)	ITA (Italy)	KEN (Kenya)	EST (Estonia)	FIN (Finland)	GRE (Greece)	CHL (Chile)	EUR (Europe)	JPN (Japan)	Points

Key
Colour	Result
Gold	Winner
Silver	2nd place
Bronze	3rd place
Green	Points finish
Blue	Non-points finish
Blue	Non-classified finish (NC)
Purple	Did not finish (Ret)
Black	Excluded (EX)
Black	Disqualified (DSQ)
White	Did not start (DNS)
White	Cancelled (C)
Blank	Withdrew entry from the event (WD)
