= 2021 Rally de Portugal =

54th edition of Rally de Portugal

2021 Rally de Portugal Vodafone Rally de Portugal 2021
Round 4 of 12 in the 2021 World Rally Championship
← Previous event	Next event →
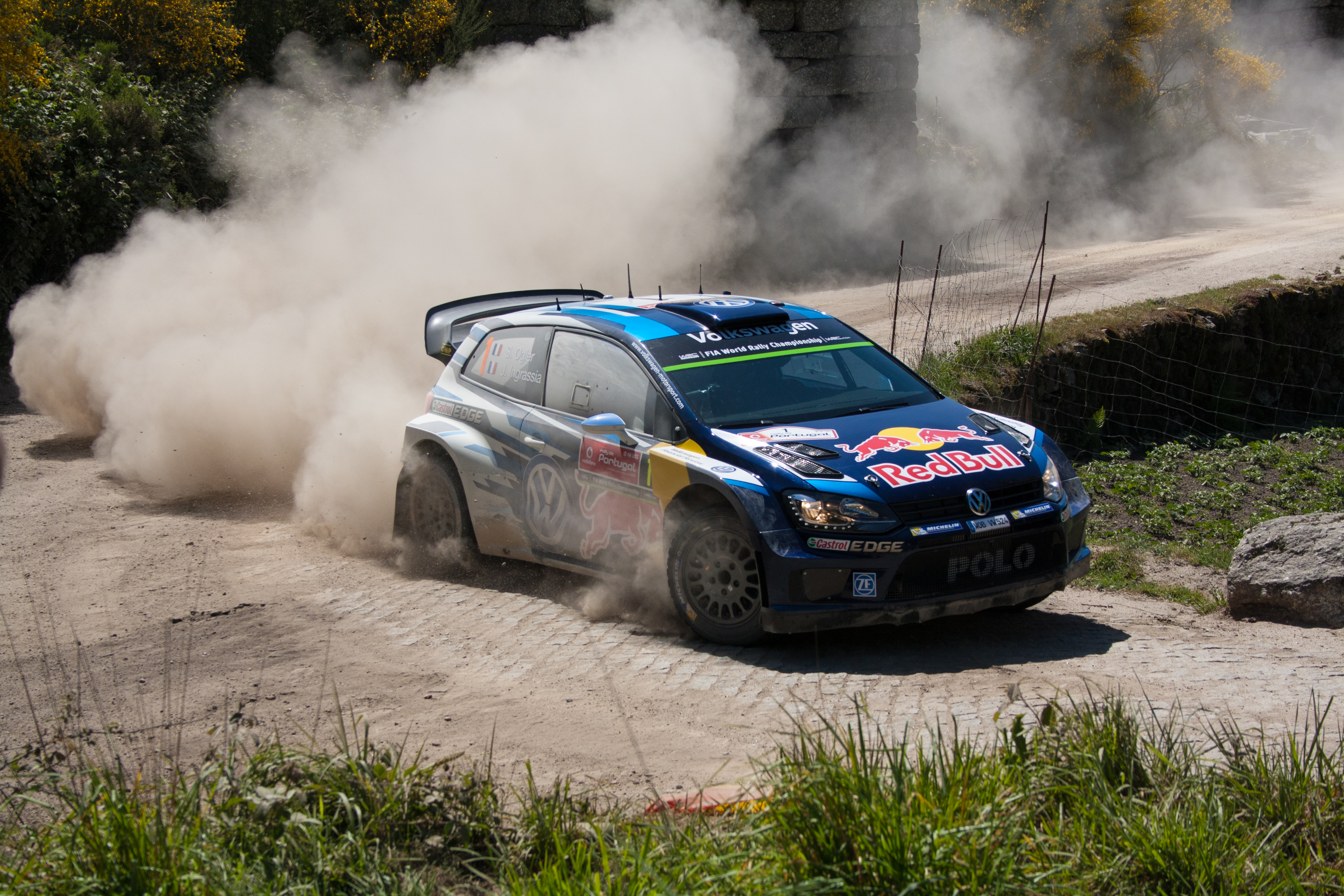
- Rally de Portugal is the first gravel event on the 2021 calendar.
- Host country: Portugal
- Rally base: Matosinhos, Porto
- Dates run: 20 – 23 May 2021
- Start location: Lousã, Coimbra
- Finish location: Fafe, Braga
- Stages: 20 (337.51 km; 209.72 miles)
- Stage surface: Gravel
- Transport distance: 1,175.56 km (730.46 miles)
- Overall distance: 1,514.07 km (940.80 miles)

Statistics
- Crews registered: 81
- Crews: 76 at start, 44 at finish

Overall results
- Overall winner: (United Kingdom) Elfyn Evans (United Kingdom) Scott Martin (Japan) Toyota Gazoo Racing WRT; 3:38:26.2
- Power Stage winner: (Estonia) Ott Tänak (Estonia) Martin Järveoja (South Korea) Hyundai Shell Mobis WRT; 6:27.2

Support category results
- WRC-2 winner: (Finland) Esapekka Lappi (Finland) Janne Ferm (Italy) Movisport; 3:48:03.4
- WRC-3 winner: (Poland) Kajetan Kajetanowicz (Poland) Maciej Szczepaniak; 3:52:49.7
- J-WRC winner: (Latvia) Mārtiņš Sesks (Latvia) Francis Renars (Latvia) LMT Autosporta Akademija; 4:15:52.7

The 2021 Rally de Portugal (also known as the Vodafone Rally de Portugal 2021) was a motor racing event for rally cars that was held over four days between 20 and 23 May 2021. It marked the fifty-fourth running of the Rally de Portugal. The event was the fourth round of the 2021 World Rally Championship, World Rally Championship-2 and World Rally Championship-3, as well as the second round of the 2021 Junior World Rally Championship. The 2021 event was based in Matosinhos in the Porto District and was contested over twenty special stages totalling 337.51 km (209.72 mi) in competitive distance.

Ott Tänak and Martin Järveoja were the defending rally winners. Toyota Gazoo Racing WRT, the team they drove for in 2019, were the defending manufacturers' winners. Kalle Rovanperä and Jonne Halttunen were the defending winners in the WRC-2 category, (Note: The championship was known as the World Rally Championship-2 Pro in 2019.) but they did not defend their titles as they were promoted to the top class by Toyota. In the WRC-3 category, Pierre-Louis Loubet and Vincent Landais were the reigning rally winners, (Note: The championship was known as the World Rally Championship-2 in 2019.) but they did not defend their titles neither as they were promoted to the top class by Hyundai 2C Competition.

Elfyn Evans and Scott Martin won the rally, the first of their season. Their team, Toyota Gazoo Racing WRT, successfully defended their titles. Esapekka Lappi and Janne Ferm won the World Rally Championship-2 category, while Kajetan Kajetanowicz and Maciej Szczepaniak won the World Rally Championship-3 category. The Latvian crew of Mārtiņš Sesks and Francis Renars was the winner in the junior class.

== Background ==
=== Championship standings prior to the event ===
Reigning World Champions Sébastien Ogier and Julien Ingrassia entered the round with an eight-point lead over Thierry Neuville and Martijn Wydaeghe. Elfyn Evans and Scott Martin were third, a further two points behind. In the World Rally Championship for Manufacturers, Toyota Gazoo Racing WRT held a twenty-seven-point lead over defending manufacturers' champions Hyundai Shell Mobis WRT, followed by M-Sport Ford WRT.

In the World Rally Championship-2 standings, Andreas Mikkelsen and Ola Fløene held a thirty-five-point lead ahead of Marco Bulacia Wilkinson and Marcelo Der Ohannesian in the drivers' and co-drivers' standings respectively, with Esapekka Lappi and Janne Ferm in third. In the teams' championship, Toksport WRT led Movisport by fifteen points, with M-Sport Ford WRT in third.

In the World Rally Championship-3 standings, Yohan Rossel led the drivers' championship, while Yannick Roche led the co-drivers' championship. Driver Nicolas Ciamin and co-driver Benoît Fulcrand set in second, followed by the crew of Teemu Asunmaa and Marko Salminen.

In the junior championship, Jon Armstrong and Phil Hall led Mārtiņš Sesks and Renars Francis by nine points. Sami Pajari and Marko Salminen were third, one point further back. In the Nations' standings, United Kingdom held aseven-point lead over Latvia, with Finland in third.

=== Entry list ===
The following crews entered the rally. The event was opened to crews competing in the World Rally Championship, its support categories, the World Rally Championship-2 and World Rally Championship-3, Junior World Rally Championship and privateer entries that were not registered to score points in any championship. Eleven entries for the World Rally Championship were received, as were twelve in the World Rally Championship-2 and twenty-five in the World Rally Championship-3. A further eight crews entered the Junior World Rally Championship in Ford Fiesta Rally4s.

Rally1 entries competing in the World Rally Championship
No.	Driver	Co-Driver	Entrant	Car	Tyre
1	(France) Sébastien Ogier	(France) Julien Ingrassia	(Japan) Toyota Gazoo Racing WRT	Toyota Yaris WRC	P
6	(Spain) Dani Sordo	(Spain) Borja Rozada	(South Korea) Hyundai Shell Mobis WRT	Hyundai i20 Coupe WRC	P
7	(France) Pierre-Louis Loubet	(France) Florian Haut-Labourdette	(France) Hyundai 2C Competition	Hyundai i20 Coupe WRC	P
8	(Estonia) Ott Tänak	(Estonia) Martin Järveoja	(South Korea) Hyundai Shell Mobis WRT	Hyundai i20 Coupe WRC	P
11	(Belgium) Thierry Neuville	(Belgium) Martijn Wydaeghe	(South Korea) Hyundai Shell Mobis WRT	Hyundai i20 Coupe WRC	P
16	(France) Adrien Fourmaux	(Belgium) Renaud Jamoul	(United Kingdom) M-Sport Ford WRT	Ford Fiesta WRC	P
18	(Japan) Takamoto Katsuta	(United Kingdom) Daniel Barritt	(Japan) Toyota Gazoo Racing WRT	Toyota Yaris WRC	P
33	(United Kingdom) Elfyn Evans	(United Kingdom) Scott Martin	(Japan) Toyota Gazoo Racing WRT	Toyota Yaris WRC	P
44	(United Kingdom) Gus Greensmith	(Republic of Ireland) Chris Patterson	(United Kingdom) M-Sport Ford WRT	Ford Fiesta WRC	P
67	(France) Cyrille Féraud	(France) Benoît Manzo	(France) Cyrille Féraud	Citroën DS3 WRC	P
69	(Finland) Kalle Rovanperä	(Finland) Jonne Halttunen	(Japan) Toyota Gazoo Racing WRT	Toyota Yaris WRC	P

Rally2 entries competing in the World Rally Championship-2
No.	Driver	Co-Driver	Entrant	Car	Tyre
20	(Norway) Andreas Mikkelsen	(Norway) Ola Fløene	(Germany) Toksport WRT	Škoda Fabia R5 Evo	—N/a
21	(Bolivia) Marco Bulacia Wilkinson	(Argentina) Marcelo Der Ohannesian	(Germany) Toksport WRT	Škoda Fabia R5 Evo	P
22	(Finland) Esapekka Lappi	(Finland) Janne Ferm	(Italy) Movisport	Volkswagen Polo GTI R5	P
23	(Norway) Mads Østberg	(Norway) Torstein Eriksen	(Hungary) TRT World Rally Team	Citroën C3 Rally2	P
24	(Finland) Teemu Suninen	(Finland) Mikko Markkula	(United Kingdom) M-Sport Ford WRT	Ford Fiesta R5 Mk. II	P
25	Nikolay Gryazin (Note: Nikolay Gryazin is Russian, but he competes as a neutral competitor using the designation RAF (Russian Automobile Federation), as the Court of Arbitration for Sport upheld a ban on Russia competing at World Championships. The ban was implemented by the World Anti-Doping Agency in response to state-sponsored doping program of Russian athletes.)	Konstantin Aleksandrov (Note: Konstantin Aleksandrov is Russian, but he competes as a neutral competitor using the designation RAF (Russian Automobile Federation), as the Court of Arbitration for Sport upheld a ban on Russia competing at World Championships. The ban was implemented by the World Anti-Doping Agency in response to state-sponsored doping program of Russian athletes.)	(Italy) Movisport	Volkswagen Polo GTI R5	P
26	(France) Eric Camilli	(France) Benjamin Veillas	(Portugal) Sports & You	Citroën C3 Rally2	P
27	(Norway) Ole Christian Veiby	(Sweden) Jonas Andersson	(South Korea) Hyundai Motorsport N	Hyundai i20 R5	—N/a
28	(Czech Republic) Martin Prokop	(Czech Republic) Viktor Chytka	(United Kingdom) M-Sport Ford WRT	Ford Fiesta R5 Mk. II	P
29	(Estonia) Georg Linnamäe	(Ukraine) Volodymyr Korsia	(Estonia) ALM Motorsport	Volkswagen Polo GTI R5	—N/a
30	(Sweden) Oliver Solberg	(Republic of Ireland) Aaron Johnston	(South Korea) Hyundai Motorsport N	Hyundai i20 R5	P
31	(Sweden) Tom Kristensson	(Sweden) David Arhusiander	(United Kingdom) M-Sport Ford WRT	Ford Fiesta R5 Mk. II	P

Rally2 entries competing in the World Rally Championship-3 (Note: Under the Sporting Regulations, each car competing in the World Rally Championship-3 is entered under the driver's name.)
No.	Driver	Co-Driver	Entrant	Car	Tyre
32	(France) Yohan Rossel	(France) Alexandre Coria	(France) Yohan Rossel	Citroën C3 Rally2	P
34	(France) Nicolas Ciamin	(France) Yannick Roche	(France) Nicolas Ciamin	Citroën C3 Rally2	P
35	(Poland) Kajetan Kajetanowicz	(Poland) Maciej Szczepaniak	(Poland) Kajetan Kajetanowicz	Škoda Fabia R5 Evo	P
36	(Estonia) Egon Kaur	(Estonia) Silver Simm	(Estonia) Kaur Motorsport	Volkswagen Polo GTI R5	P
37	(Finland) Emil Lindholm	(Finland) Reeta Hämäläinen	(Finland) Emil Lindholm	Škoda Fabia R5 Evo	P
38	(United Kingdom) Chris Ingram	(United Kingdom) Ross Whittock	(United Kingdom) Chris Ingram	Škoda Fabia R5 Evo	P
39	(Paraguay) Fabrizio Zaldívar	(Spain) Carlos del Barrio	(Paraguay) Fabrizio Zaldívar	Škoda Fabia R5 Evo	P
40	(Estonia) Gregor Jeets	(Estonia) Andrus Toom	(Estonia) Gregor Jeets	Škoda Fabia R5 Evo	P
41	(Austria) Niki Mayr-Melnhof	(Austria) Leopold Welsersheimb	(Austria) Niki Mayr-Melnhof	Ford Fiesta R5 Mk. II	P
42	(Portugal) Armindo Araújo	(Portugal) Luís Ramalho	(Portugal) Armindo Araújo	Škoda Fabia R5 Evo	P
43	(Portugal) Bruno Magalhães	(Portugal) Carlos Magalhães	(Portugal) Bruno Magalhães	Hyundai i20 R5	P
45	(Portugal) Ricardo Teodósio	(Portugal) José Teixeira	(Portugal) Ricardo Teodósio	Škoda Fabia R5 Evo	P
46	(Portugal) José Pedro Fontes	(Portugal) Inês Ponte	(Portugal) José Pedro Fontes	Citroën C3 Rally2	P
47	(Portugal) Bernardo Sousa	(Portugal) Victor Calado	(Portugal) Bernardo Sousa	Škoda Fabia R5	P
48	(Portugal) Miguel Correia	(Portugal) António Costa	(Portugal) Miguel Correia	Škoda Fabia R5 Evo	P
49	(Chile) Alberto Heller	(Spain) Marc Martí	(Chile) Alberto Heller	Citroën C3 Rally2	P
50	(Portugal) Pedro Meireles	(Portugal) Mário Castro	(Portugal) Pedro Meireles	Volkswagen Polo GTI R5	P
51	(Spain) Jan Solans	(Spain) Rodrigo Sanjuan de Eusebio	(Spain) Jan Solans	Citroën C3 Rally2	P
52	(Spain) Pepe López	(Spain) Diego Vallejo	(Spain) Pepe López	Škoda Fabia R5 Evo	P
53	(Portugal) Paulo Neto	(Portugal) Vítor Hugo	(Portugal) Paulo Neto	Škoda Fabia R5	P
54	(Chile) Emilio Fernández	(Argentina) Ruben Garcia	(Chile) Emilio Fernández	Škoda Fabia R5 Evo	P
55	(Portugal) Diogo Salvi	(Portugal) Jorge Eduardo Carvalho	(Portugal) Diogo Salvi	Škoda Fabia R5	P
56	(Republic of Ireland) Josh McErlean	(United Kingdom) Keaton Williams	(Republic of Ireland) Josh McErlean	Hyundai i20 R5	P
57	(Portugal) André Villas-Boas	(Portugal) Gonçalo Magalhães	(Portugal) André Villas-Boas	Citroën C3 Rally2	P
58	(Portugal) João Fernando Ramos	(Portugal) José Janela	(Portugal) João Fernando Ramos	Škoda Fabia R5	P

Rally4 entries competing in the Junior World Rally Championship
No.	Driver	Co-Driver	Entrant	Car	Tyre
59	(United Kingdom) Jon Armstrong	(United Kingdom) Phil Hall	(United Kingdom) Jon Armstrong	Ford Fiesta Rally4	P
60	(Latvia) Mārtiņš Sesks	(Latvia) Francis Renars	(Latvia) LMT Autosporta Akademija	Ford Fiesta Rally4	P
61	(Finland) Sami Pajari	(Finland) Marko Salminen	(Finland) Porvoon Autopalvelu	Ford Fiesta Rally4	P
62	(Finland) Lauri Joona	(Finland) Ari Koponen	(Finland) Team Flying Finn	Ford Fiesta Rally4	P
63	(Slovakia) Martin Koči	(Czech Republic) Petr Těšínský	(Slovakia) Styllex Motorsport	Ford Fiesta Rally4	P
64	(Republic of Ireland) William Creighton	(Republic of Ireland) Liam Regan	(Republic of Ireland) Motorsport Ireland Rally Academy	Ford Fiesta Rally4	P
65	(Romania) Raul Badiu	(Romania) Rareș Fetean	(Romania) Raul Badiu	Ford Fiesta Rally4	P
66	(Estonia) Robert Virves	(Estonia) Sander Pruul	Autosport Team Estonia	Ford Fiesta Rally4	P

=== Route ===
==== Itinerary ====
All dates and times are WEST (UTC+1).

Leg	Date	Time	No.	Stage name	Distance
—N/a	20 May	09:01	—	Paredes [Shakedown]	4.60 km
1	21 May	08:08	SS1	Lousã 1	12.35 km
1	21 May	09:08	SS2	Góis 1	19.51 km
1	21 May	10:08	SS3	Arganil 1	18.82 km
1	21 May	12:31	SS4	Lousã 2	12.35 km
1	21 May	13:31	SS5	Góis 2	19.51 km
1	21 May	14:38	SS6	Arganil 2	18.82 km
1	21 May	16:05	SS7	Mortágua	18.16 km
1	21 May	19:03	SS8	SSS Lousada	3.36 km
2	22 May	08:08	SS9	Vieira do Minho 1	20.64 km
2	22 May	09:08	SS10	Cabeceiras de Basto 1	22.37 km
2	22 May	10:24	SS11	Amarante 1	37.92 km
2	22 May	14:38	SS12	Vieira do Minho 2	20.64 km
2	22 May	15:38	SS13	Cabeceiras de Basto 2	22.37 km
2	22 May	16:54	SS14	Amarante 2	37.92 km
2	22 May	19:03	SS15	SSS Porto — Foz	3.30 km
3	23 May	07:08	SS16	Felgueiras 1	9.18 km
3	23 May	07:53	SS17	Montim	8.75 km
3	23 May	08:38	SS18	Fafe 1	11.18 km
3	23 May	10:04	SS19	Felgueiras 2	9.18 km
3	23 May	12:18	SS20	Fafe 2 [Power Stage]	11.18 km

== Report ==
=== World Rally Cars ===
==== Classification ====
Position		No.	Driver	Co-driver	Entrant	Car	Time	Difference	Points	
Event	Class	No.	Driver	Co-driver	Entrant	Car	Time	Difference	Event	Stage
1	1	33	Elfyn Evans	Scott Martin	Toyota Gazoo Racing WRT	Toyota Yaris WRC	3:38:26.2	0.0	25	1
2	2	6	Dani Sordo	Borja Rozada	Hyundai Shell Mobis WRT	Hyundai i20 Coupe WRC	3:38:54.5	+28.3	18	0
3	3	1	Sébastien Ogier	Julien Ingrassia	Toyota Gazoo Racing WRT	Toyota Yaris WRC	3:39:49.8	+1:23.6	15	3
4	4	18	Takamoto Katsuta	Daniel Barritt	Toyota Gazoo Racing WRT	Toyota Yaris WRC	3:40:54.6	+2:28.4	12	0
5	5	44	Gus Greensmith	Chris Patterson	M-Sport Ford WRT	Ford Fiesta WRC	3:43:18.9	+4:52.7	10	0
6	6	16	Adrien Fourmaux	Renaud Jamoul	M-Sport Ford WRT	Ford Fiesta WRC	3:43:29.6	+5:03.4	8	0
21	7	8	Ott Tänak	Martin Järveoja	Hyundai Shell Mobis WRT	Hyundai i20 Coupe WRC	3:59:04.0	+20:37.8	0	5
22	8	69	Kalle Rovanperä	Jonne Halttunen	Toyota Gazoo Racing WRT	Toyota Yaris WRC	4:00:36.4	+22:10.2	0	2
36	9	11	Thierry Neuville	Martijn Wydaeghe	Hyundai Shell Mobis WRT	Hyundai i20 Coupe WRC	4:37:50.3	+59:24.1	0	4
Retired SS2		7	Pierre-Louis Loubet	Florian Haut-Labourdette	Hyundai 2C Competition	Hyundai i20 Coupe WRC	Off-road		0	0

==== Special stages ====
Day	Stage	Stage name	Length	Winners	Car	Time	Class leaders
20 May	—	Paredes [Shakedown]	4.60 km	Evans / Martin	Toyota Yaris WRC	3:05.9	—N/a
21 May	SS1	Lousã 1	12.35 km	Tänak / Järveoja	Hyundai i20 Coupe WRC	9:04.7	Tänak / Järveoja
21 May	SS2	Góis 1	19.51 km	Sordo / Rozada	Hyundai i20 Coupe WRC	12:59.0	Sordo / Rozada
21 May	SS3	Arganil 1	18.82 km	Sordo / Rozada	Hyundai i20 Coupe WRC	11:54.4	Sordo / Rozada
21 May	SS4	Lousã 2	12.35 km	Rovanperä / Halttunen	Toyota Yaris WRC	9:02.6	Sordo / Rozada
21 May	SS5	Góis 2	19.51 km	Sordo / Rozada	Hyundai i20 Coupe WRC	13:04.4	Sordo / Rozada
21 May	SS6	Arganil 2	18.82 km	Tänak / Järveoja	Hyundai i20 Coupe WRC	11:52.4	Sordo / Rozada
21 May	SS7	Mortágua	18.16 km	Ogier / Ingrassia	Toyota Yaris WRC	11:42.7	Tänak / Järveoja
21 May	SS8	SSS Lousada	3.36 km	Tänak / Järveoja	Hyundai i20 Coupe WRC	2:31.4	Tänak / Järveoja
22 May	SS9	Vieira do Minho 1	20.64 km	Tänak / Järveoja	Hyundai i20 Coupe WRC	12:41.7	Tänak / Järveoja
22 May	SS10	Cabeceiras de Basto 1	22.37 km	Tänak / Järveoja	Hyundai i20 Coupe WRC	13:33.7	Tänak / Järveoja
22 May	SS11	Amarante 1	37.92 km	Tänak / Järveoja	Hyundai i20 Coupe WRC	24:11.9	Tänak / Järveoja
22 May	SS12	Vieira do Minho 2	20.64 km	Evans / Martin	Toyota Yaris WRC	12:36.6	Tänak / Järveoja
22 May	SS13	Cabeceiras de Basto 2	22.37 km	Tänak / Järveoja	Hyundai i20 Coupe WRC	13:36.4	Tänak / Järveoja
22 May	SS14	Amarante 2	37.92 km	Evans / Martin	Toyota Yaris WRC	24:21.0	Evans / Martin
22 May	SS15	SSS Porto — Foz	3.30 km	Sordo / Rozada	Hyundai i20 Coupe WRC	3:04.1	Evans / Martin
23 May	SS16	Felgueiras 1	9.18 km	Evans / Martin	Toyota Yaris WRC	6:05.1	Evans / Martin
23 May	SS17	Montim	8.75 km	Evans / Martin	Toyota Yaris WRC	5:44.6	Evans / Martin
23 May	SS18	Fafe 1	11.18 km	Neuville / Wydaeghe	Hyundai i20 Coupe WRC	6:39.2	Evans / Martin
23 May	SS19	Felgueiras 2	9.18 km	Evans / Martin	Toyota Yaris WRC	6:03.7	Evans / Martin
23 May	SS20	Fafe 2 [Power Stage]	11.18 km	Tänak / Järveoja	Hyundai i20 Coupe WRC	6:27.2	Evans / Martin

==== Championship standings ====
Pos.	Drivers' championships			Co-drivers' championships			Manufacturers' championships		
Pos.	Move	Driver	Points	Move	Co-driver	Points	Move	Manufacturer	Points
1		Sébastien Ogier	79		Julien Ingrassia	79		Toyota Gazoo Racing WRT	183
2	1	Elfyn Evans	77	1	Scott Martin	77		Hyundai Shell Mobis WRT	146
3	1	Thierry Neuville	57	1	Martijn Wydaeghe	57		M-Sport Ford WRT	64
4		Ott Tänak	45		Martin Järveoja	45		Hyundai 2C Competition	28
5		Kalle Rovanperä	41		Jonne Halttunen	41			

=== World Rally Championship-2 ===
==== Classification ====
Position		No.	Driver	Co-driver	Entrant	Car	Time	Difference	Points		
Event	Class	No.	Driver	Co-driver	Entrant	Car	Time	Difference	Class	Stage	Event
7	1	22	Esapekka Lappi	Janne Ferm	Movisport	Volkswagen Polo GTI R5	3:48:03.4	0.0	25	5	6
8	2	22	Teemu Suninen	Mikko Markkula	M-Sport Ford WRT	Ford Fiesta R5 Mk. II	3:49:46.2	+1:42.8	18	1	4
9	3	23	Mads Østberg	Torstein Eriksen	TRT World Rally Team	Citroën C3 Rally2	3:49:46.2	+1:42.8	15	2	2
10	4	25	Nikolay Gryazin	Konstantin Aleksandrov	Movisport	Volkswagen Polo GTI R5	3:51:02.0	+2:58.6	12	0	1
11	5	30	Oliver Solberg	Aaron Johnston	Hyundai Motorsport N	Hyundai i20 R5	3:51:16.9	+3:13.5	10	0	0
12	6	21	Marco Bulacia Wilkinson	Marcelo Der Ohannesian	Toksport WRT	Škoda Fabia R5 Evo	3:52:45.0	+4:41.6	8	4	0
20	7	28	Martin Prokop	Viktor Chytka	M-Sport Ford WRT	Ford Fiesta R5 Mk. II	3:58:32.7	+10:29.3	6	0	0
39	8	26	Eric Camilli	Benjamin Veillas	Sports & You	Citroën C3 Rally2	4:41:15.1	+53:11.7	4	3	0
40	9	31	Tom Kristensson	David Arhusiander	M-Sport Ford WRT	Ford Fiesta R5 Mk. II	4:52:19.9	+1:04:16.5	2	0	0
Did not start		20	Andreas Mikkelsen	Ola Fløene	Toksport WRT	Škoda Fabia R5 Evo	COVID-19 positive		0	0	0
Did not start		27	Ole Christian Veiby	Jonas Andersson	Hyundai Motorsport N	Hyundai i20 R5	COVID-19 positive		0	0	0
Did not start		29	Georg Linnamäe	Volodymyr Korsia	ALM Motorsport	Volkswagen Polo GTI R5	Withdrawn		0	0	0

==== Special stages ====
Day	Stage	Stage name	Length	Winners	Car	Time	Class leaders
20 May	—	Paredes [Shakedown]	4.60 km	Lappi / Ferm	Volkswagen Polo GTI R5	3:14.0	—N/a
21 May	SS1	Lousã 1	12.35 km	Gryazin / Aleksandrov	Volkswagen Polo GTI R5	9:23.3	Gryazin / Aleksandrov
21 May	SS2	Góis 1	19.51 km	Lappi / Ferm	Volkswagen Polo GTI R5	13:34.8	Suninen / Markkula
21 May	SS3	Arganil 1	18.82 km	Lappi / Ferm	Volkswagen Polo GTI R5	12:37.7	Lappi / Ferm
21 May	SS4	Lousã 2	12.35 km	Gryazin / Aleksandrov	Volkswagen Polo GTI R5	9:22.1	Gryazin / Aleksandrov
21 May	SS5	Góis 2	19.51 km	Suninen / Markkula	Ford Fiesta R5 Mk. II	13:36.3	Lappi / Ferm
21 May	SS6	Arganil 2	18.82 km	Gryazin / Aleksandrov	Volkswagen Polo GTI R5	12:25.7	Lappi / Ferm
21 May	SS7	Mortágua	18.16 km	Solberg / Johnston	Hyundai i20 R5	12:03.8	Lappi / Ferm
21 May	SS8	SSS Lousada	3.36 km	Solberg / Johnston; Lappi / Ferm	Hyundai i20 R5; Volkswagen Polo GTI R5	2:38.4	Lappi / Ferm
22 May	SS9	Vieira do Minho 1	20.64 km	Lappi / Ferm	Volkswagen Polo GTI R5	13:21.0	Lappi / Ferm
22 May	SS10	Cabeceiras de Basto 1	22.37 km	Lappi / Ferm	Volkswagen Polo GTI R5	14:26.3	Lappi / Ferm
22 May	SS11	Amarante 1	37.92 km	Lappi / Ferm	Volkswagen Polo GTI R5	25:24.2	Lappi / Ferm
22 May	SS12	Vieira do Minho 2	20.64 km	Solberg / Johnston	Hyundai i20 R5	13:14.7	Lappi / Ferm
22 May	SS13	Cabeceiras de Basto 2	22.37 km	Gryazin / Aleksandrov	Volkswagen Polo GTI R5	14:14.0	Lappi / Ferm
22 May	SS14	Amarante 2	37.92 km	Østberg / Eriksen	Citroën C3 Rally2	25:18.0	Lappi / Ferm
22 May	SS15	SSS Porto — Foz	3.30 km	Østberg / Eriksen	Citroën C3 Rally2	3:07.8	Lappi / Ferm
23 May	SS16	Felgueiras 1	9.18 km	Gryazin / Aleksandrov	Volkswagen Polo GTI R5	6:17.8	Lappi / Ferm
23 May	SS17	Montim	8.75 km	Østberg / Eriksen	Citroën C3 Rally2	5:58.6	Lappi / Ferm
23 May	SS18	Fafe 1	11.18 km	Østberg / Eriksen	Citroën C3 Rally2	6:58.4	Lappi / Ferm
23 May	SS19	Felgueiras 2	9.18 km	Østberg / Eriksen	Citroën C3 Rally2	6:16.5	Lappi / Ferm
23 May	SS20	Fafe 2 [Power Stage]	11.18 km	Lappi / Ferm	Volkswagen Polo GTI R5	6:52.1	Lappi / Ferm

==== Championship standings ====
Pos.	Drivers' championships			Co-drivers' championships			Teams' championships		
Pos.	Move	Driver	Points	Move	Co-driver	Points	Move	Manufacturer	Points
1		Andreas Mikkelsen	68		Ola Fløene	68	1	Movisport	125
2	1	Esapekka Lappi	59	1	Janne Ferm	59	1	Toksport WRT	100
3	1	Marco Bulacia Wilkinson	45	1	Marcelo Der Ohannesian	45		M-Sport Ford WRT	71
4		Mads Østberg	44		Torstein Eriksen	44	New entry	Hyundai Motorsport N	12
5	1	Teemu Suninen	41	1	Mikko Markkula	41			

=== World Rally Championship-3 ===
==== Classification ====
Position		No.	Driver	Co-driver	Entrant	Car	Time	Difference	Points		
Event	Class	No.	Driver	Co-driver	Entrant	Car	Time	Difference	Class	Stage	Event
13	1	35	Kajetan Kajetanowicz	Maciej Szczepaniak	Kajetan Kajetanowicz	Škoda Fabia R5 Evo	3:52:49.7	0.0	25	3	0
14	2	32	Yohan Rossel	Alexandre Coria	Yohan Rossel	Citroën C3 Rally2	3:52:55.3	+5.6	18	4	0
15	3	38	Chris Ingram	Ross Whittock	Chris Ingram	Škoda Fabia R5 Evo	3:53:45.0	+55.3	15	2	0
16	4	34	Nicolas Ciamin	Yannick Roche	Nicolas Ciamin	Citroën C3 Rally2	3:54:21.2	+1:31.5	12	1	0
17	5	56	Josh McErlean	Keaton Williams	Josh McErlean	Hyundai i20 R5	3:57:00.5	+4:10.8	10	0	0
18	6	39	Fabrizio Zaldívar	Carlos del Barrio	Fabrizio Zaldívar	Škoda Fabia R5 Evo	3:57:57.4	+5:07.7	8	0	0
19	7	42	Armindo Araújo	Luís Ramalho	Armindo Araújo	Škoda Fabia R5 Evo	3:58:14.6	+5:24.9	6	0	0
23	8	49	Alberto Heller	Marc Martí	Alberto Heller	Citroën C3 Rally2	4:02:48.2	+9:58.5	4	0	0
24	9	53	Paulo Neto	Vítor Hugo	Paulo Neto	Škoda Fabia R5	4:14:47.8	+21:58.1	2	0	0
27	10	37	Emil Lindholm	Reeta Hämäläinen	Emil Lindholm	Škoda Fabia R5 Evo	4:18:05.9	+25:16.2	1	5	0
30	11	40	Gregor Jeets	Andrus Toom	Gregor Jeets	Škoda Fabia R5 Evo	4:26:20.7	+33:31.0	0	0	0
32	12	57	André Villas-Boas	Gonçalo Magalhães	André Villas-Boas	Citroën C3 Rally2	4:27:53.3	+35:03.6	0	0	0
38	13	54	Emilio Fernández	Ruben Garcia	Emilio Fernández	Škoda Fabia R5 Evo	4:40:45.3	+47:55.6	0	0	0
Retired SS20		41	Niki Mayr-Melnhof	Leopold Welsersheimb	Niki Mayr-Melnhof	Ford Fiesta R5 Mk. II	Rolled		0	0	0
Retired SS19		43	Bruno Magalhães	Carlos Magalhães	Bruno Magalhães	Hyundai i20 R5	Engine		0	0	0
Retired SS12		51	Jan Solans	Rodrigo Sanjuan de Eusebio	Jan Solans	Citroën C3 Rally2	Fitness		0	0	0
Retired SS10		36	Egon Kaur	Silver Simm	Kaur Motorsport	Volkswagen Polo GTI R5	Rolled		0	0	0
Retired SS3		58	João Fernando Ramos	José Janela	João Fernando Ramos	Škoda Fabia R5	Rolled		0	0	0
Retired SS2		48	Miguel Correia	António Costa	Miguel Correia	Škoda Fabia R5 Evo	Crash		0	0	0
Retired SS2		52	Pepe López	Diego Vallejo	Pepe López	Škoda Fabia R5 Evo	Suspension		0	0	0
Did not start		50	Pedro Meireles	Mário Castro	Pedro Meireles	Volkswagen Polo GTI R5	Withdrawn		0	0	0

==== Special stages ====
Day	Stage	Stage name	Length	Winners	Car	Time	Class leaders
20 May	—	Paredes [Shakedown]	4.60 km	Teodósio / Teixeira	Škoda Fabia R5 Evo	3:15.7	—N/a
21 May	SS1	Lousã 1	12.35 km	López / Vallejo	Škoda Fabia R5 Evo	9:27.0	López / Vallejo
21 May	SS2	Góis 1	19.51 km	Solans / Sanjuan de Eusebio	Citroën C3 Rally2	13:47.2	Solans / Sanjuan de Eusebio
21 May	SS3	Arganil 1	18.82 km	Ciamin / Roche	Citroën C3 Rally2	12:41.2	Solans / Sanjuan de Eusebio
21 May	SS4	Lousã 2	12.35 km	Rossel / Coria	Citroën C3 Rally2	9:27.4	Solans / Sanjuan de Eusebio
21 May	SS5	Góis 2	19.51 km	Rossel / Coria	Citroën C3 Rally2	13:47.4	Rossel / Coria
21 May	SS6	Arganil 2	18.82 km	Kajetanowicz / Szczepaniak	Škoda Fabia R5 Evo	12:41.4	Rossel / Coria
21 May	SS7	Mortágua	18.16 km	Araújo / Ramalho	Škoda Fabia R5 Evo	12:27.2	Rossel / Coria
21 May	SS8	SSS Lousada	3.36 km	Kajetanowicz / Szczepaniak	Škoda Fabia R5 Evo	2:38.1	Rossel / Coria
22 May	SS9	Vieira do Minho 1	20.64 km	Kaur / Simm	Volkswagen Polo GTI R5	13:41.3	Rossel / Coria
22 May	SS10	Cabeceiras de Basto 1	22.37 km	Kajetanowicz / Szczepaniak	Škoda Fabia R5 Evo	14:48.9	Kajetanowicz / Szczepaniak
22 May	SS11	Amarante 1	37.92 km	Kajetanowicz / Szczepaniak	Škoda Fabia R5 Evo	26:00.0	Kajetanowicz / Szczepaniak
22 May	SS12	Vieira do Minho 2	20.64 km	Kajetanowicz / Szczepaniak	Škoda Fabia R5 Evo	13:36.8	Kajetanowicz / Szczepaniak
22 May	SS13	Cabeceiras de Basto 2	22.37 km	Kajetanowicz / Szczepaniak	Škoda Fabia R5 Evo	14:40.6	Kajetanowicz / Szczepaniak
22 May	SS14	Amarante 2	37.92 km	Rossel / Coria	Citroën C3 Rally2	25:40.5	Rossel / Coria
22 May	SS15	SSS Porto — Foz	3.30 km	Rossel / Coria	Citroën C3 Rally2	3:09.1	Rossel / Coria
23 May	SS16	Felgueiras 1	9.18 km	Ingram / Whittock	Škoda Fabia R5 Evo	6:24.4	Rossel / Coria
23 May	SS17	Montim	8.75 km	Kajetanowicz / Szczepaniak	Škoda Fabia R5 Evo	6:01.1	Kajetanowicz / Szczepaniak
23 May	SS18	Fafe 1	11.18 km	Ingram / Whittock	Škoda Fabia R5 Evo	7:04.6	Kajetanowicz / Szczepaniak
23 May	SS19	Felgueiras 2	9.18 km	Rossel / Coria	Citroën C3 Rally2	6:20.6	Kajetanowicz / Szczepaniak
23 May	SS20	Fafe 2 [Power Stage]	11.18 km	Lindholm / Hämäläinen	Škoda Fabia R5 Evo	6:53.0	Kajetanowicz / Szczepaniak

==== Championship standings ====
Pos.	Drivers' championships			Co-drivers' championships		
Pos.	Move	Driver	Points	Move	Co-driver	Points
1		Yohan Rossel	70	3	Maciek Szczepaniak	56
2	2	Kajetan Kajetanowicz	56	1	Yannick Roche	49
3	1	Nicolas Ciamin	49	5	Alexandre Coria	42
4	1	Teemu Asunmaa	28	2	Benoît Fulcrand	28
5	9	Chris Ingram	28	2	Marko Salminen	28

=== Junior World Rally Championship ===
==== Classification ====
Position		No.	Driver	Co-driver	Entrant	Car	Time	Difference	Points	
Event	Class	No.	Driver	Co-driver	Entrant	Car	Time	Difference	Class	Stage
25	1	60	Mārtiņš Sesks	Francis Renars	LMT Autosporta Akademija	Ford Fiesta Rally4	4:15:52.7	0.0	25	3
28	2	61	Sami Pajari	Marko Salminen	Porvoon Autopalvelu	Ford Fiesta Rally4	4:19:04.5	+3:11.8	18	2
33	3	66	Robert Virves	Sander Pruul	Autosport Team Estonia	Ford Fiesta Rally4	4:28:00.8	+12:08.1	15	2
41	4	63	Martin Koči	Petr Těšínský	Styllex Motorsport	Ford Fiesta Rally4	4:54:37.5	+38:44.8	12	2
43	5	64	William Creighton	Liam Regan	Motorsport Ireland Rally Academy	Ford Fiesta Rally4	4:56:37.6	+40:44.9	10	2
44	6	62	Lauri Joona	Ari Koponen	Team Flying Finn	Ford Fiesta Rally4	5:27:01.8	+1:11:09.1	8	2
Retired SS14		59	Jon Armstrong	Phil Hall	Jon Armstrong	Ford Fiesta Rally4	Engine		0	6
Retired SS4		65	Raul Badiu	Rareș Fetean	Raul Badiu	Ford Fiesta Rally4	Steering		0	0

==== Special stages ====
Day	Stage	Stage name	Length	Winners	Car	Time	Class leaders
20 May	—	Paredes [Shakedown]	4.60 km	Sesks / Renars	Ford Fiesta Rally4	3:37.3	—N/a
21 May	SS1	Lousã 1	12.35 km	Pajari / Salminen	Ford Fiesta Rally4	10:32.6	Pajari / Salminen
21 May	SS2	Góis 1	19.51 km	Armstrong / Hall	Ford Fiesta Rally4	15:04.2	Armstrong / Hall
21 May	SS3	Arganil 1	18.82 km	Armstrong / Hall	Ford Fiesta Rally4	13:53.3	Armstrong / Hall
21 May	SS4	Lousã 2	12.35 km	Armstrong / Hall	Ford Fiesta Rally4	10:30.0	Armstrong / Hall
21 May	SS5	Góis 2	19.51 km	Armstrong / Hall	Ford Fiesta Rally4	15:07.3	Armstrong / Hall
21 May	SS6	Arganil 2	18.82 km	Koči / Těšínský	Ford Fiesta Rally4	14:00.8	Pajari / Salminen
21 May	SS7	Mortágua	18.16 km	Armstrong / Hall	Ford Fiesta Rally4	13:28.1	Pajari / Salminen
21 May	SS8	SSS Lousada	3.36 km	Pajari / Salminen	Ford Fiesta Rally4	2:55.0	Pajari / Salminen
22 May	SS9	Vieira do Minho 1	20.64 km	Pajari / Salminen	Ford Fiesta Rally4	14:46.1	Pajari / Salminen
22 May	SS10	Cabeceiras de Basto 1	22.37 km	Sesks / Renars	Ford Fiesta Rally4	16:10.9	Pajari / Salminen
22 May	SS11	Amarante 1	37.92 km	Armstrong / Hall	Ford Fiesta Rally4	28:17.4	Sesks / Renars
22 May	SS12	Vieira do Minho 2	20.64 km	Joona / Koponen	Ford Fiesta Rally4	14:35.7	Sesks / Renars
22 May	SS13	Cabeceiras de Basto 2	22.37 km	Joona / Koponen	Ford Fiesta Rally4	15:48.8	Sesks / Renars
22 May	SS14	Amarante 2	37.92 km	Sesks / Renars	Ford Fiesta Rally4	28:25.8	Sesks / Renars
22 May	SS15	SSS Porto — Foz	3.30 km	Sesks / Renars	Ford Fiesta Rally4	3:38.4	Sesks / Renars
23 May	SS16	Felgueiras 1	9.18 km	Koči / Těšínský	Ford Fiesta Rally4	6:53.6	Sesks / Renars
23 May	SS17	Montim	8.75 km	Joona / Koponen	Ford Fiesta Rally4	6:31.2	Sesks / Renars
23 May	SS18	Fafe 1	11.18 km	Koči / Těšínský	Ford Fiesta Rally4	7:45.4	Sesks / Renars
23 May	SS19	Felgueiras 2	9.18 km	Koči / Těšínský	Ford Fiesta Rally4	6:46.9	Sesks / Renars
23 May	SS20	Fafe 2	11.18 km	Stage cancelled			

==== Championship standings ====
Pos.	Drivers' championships			Co-drivers' championships			Trophy for nations		
Pos.	Move	Driver	Points	Move	Co-driver	Points	Move	Manufacturer	Points
1	1	Mārtiņš Sesks	46	1	Renars Francis	46	1	Latvia	43
2	1	Sami Pajari	37	1	Marko Salminen	37	1	Finland	33
3	2	Jon Armstrong	33	2	Phil Hall	33	2	United Kingdom	25
4	1	Martin Koči	31	1	Petr Těšínský	31		Slovakia	24
5	1	Lauri Joona	28	1	Ari Koponen	28	1	Estonia	23

== Notes ==
Previous rally: 2021 Croatia Rally	2021 FIA World Rally Championship	Next rally: 2021 Rally Italia Sardegna
Previous rally: 2019 Rally de Portugal; 2020 edition cancelled	2021 Rally de Portugal	Next rally: 2022 Rally de Portugal
