= Pepe López =

Spanish rally driver

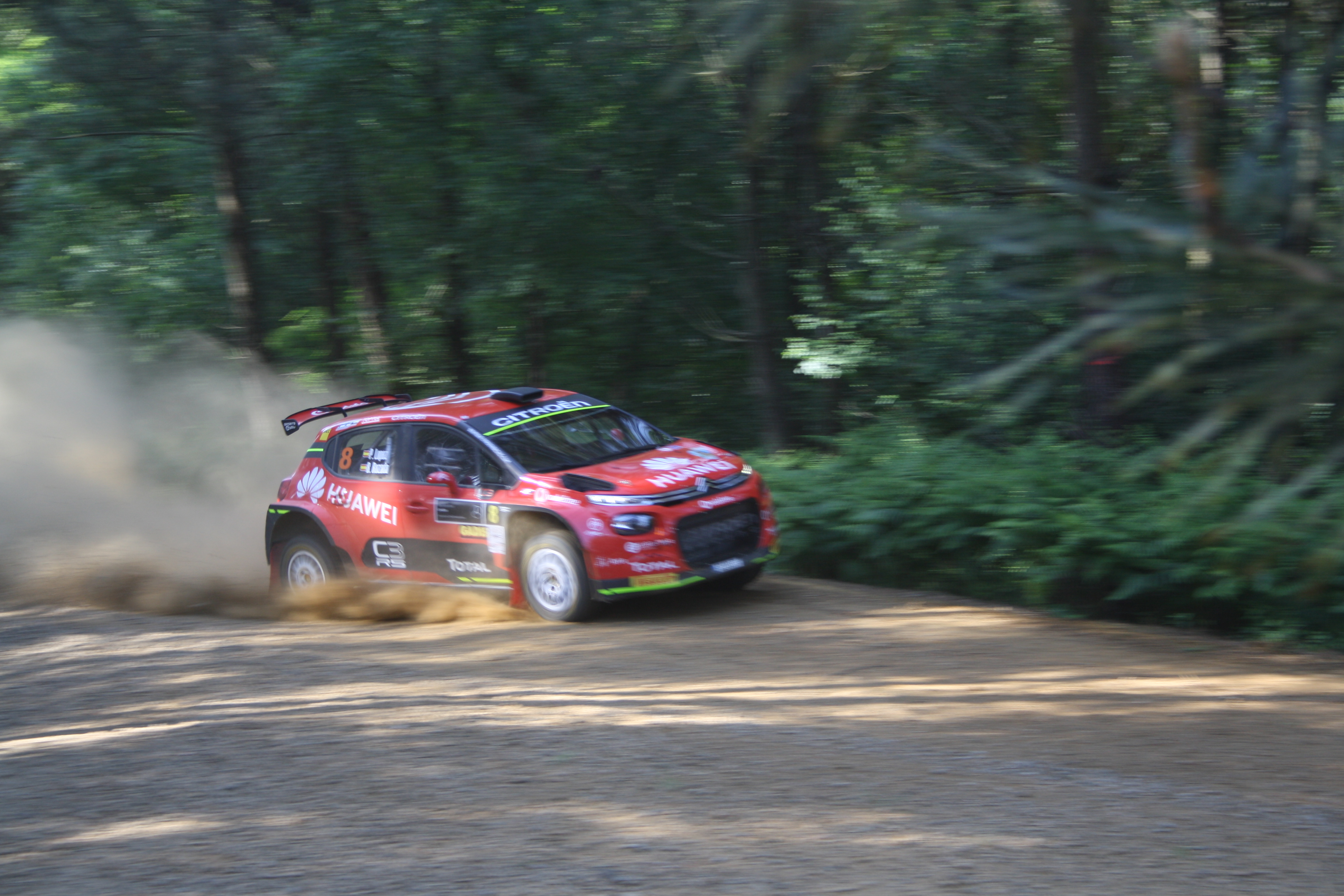

Personal information
- Nationality: (Spain) Spanish
- Born: August 17, 1995 (age 31); Madrid, Spain

World Rally Championship record
- Years active: 2014–2018, 2020–present
- Co-driver: Diego Vallejo; David Vázquez
- Rallies: 19
- Championships: 0
- Rally wins: 0
- Podiums: 0
- Stage wins: 0
- Total points: 7
- First rally: 2014 Rally Poland

Pepe López
Medal record
Rallying
Representing Spain
FIA Motorsport Games
Silver medal – second place	2022 France	Rally2

José María "Pepe" López Planelles (born on 17 August 1995 in Madrid) is a Spanish rally driver. He is the champion of the Spanish Rally Championship and Spanish Rally Super Championship.

== Rally results ==
=== WRC results ===
Year	Entrant	Car	1	2	3	4	5	6	7	8	9	10	11	12	13	14	WDC	Points
2014	RMC Motorsport	Ford Fiesta R2	MON	SWE	MEX	POR	ARG	ITA	POL; Ret	FIN; 53	GER	AUS	FRA	ESP; 29	GBR		NC	0
2015	Peugeot Sport España	Peugeot 208 R2	MON	SWE	MEX	ARG	POR	ITA	POL	FIN	GER	AUS	FRA	ESP; 33	GBR		NC	0
2016	Ya-Car Racing	Peugeot 208 R2	MON	SWE	MEX	ARG	POR	ITA	POL	FIN	GER	CHN; C	FRA	ESP; Ret	GBR; 35	AUS	NC	0
2017	Pepe López	Peugeot 208 T16	MON; Ret	SWE	MEX	FRA	ARG	POR	ITA	POL	FIN	GER	ESP	GBR	AUS		24th	1
2018	Sports and You	Citroën C3 R5	MON	SWE	MEX	FRA	ARG	POR	ITA	FIN	GER	TUR	GBR	ESP; 31	AUS		NC	0
2020	Pepe López	Citroën C3 R5	MON; Ret	SWE	MEX	EST	TUR	ITA	MNZ								NC	0
2021	Pepe López	Škoda Fabia R5 Evo	MON	ARC	CRO	POR; Ret	ITA; 8	KEN	EST; 15	BEL; WD	GRE	FIN; 14	ESP; Ret	MNZ			20th	4
2022	Pepe López	Hyundai i20 N Rally2	MON	SWE	CRO	POR; WD	ITA	KEN	EST	FIN	BEL	GRE	NZL	ESP; 25	JPN		NC	0
2023	Pepe López	Hyundai i20 N Rally2	MON; 11	SWE	MEX	CRO	POR	ITA	KEN	EST	FIN	GRE	CHL	EUR	JPN		NC	0
2024	Pepe López	Škoda Fabia RS Rally2	MON; 9	SWE	KEN	CRO; 12	POR; Ret	ITA; WD	POL	LAT	FIN	GRE	CHL	EUR	JPN		28th	2

=== WRC-2 results ===
Year	Entrant	Car	1	2	3	4	5	6	7	8	9	10	11	12	13	Pos.	Points
2018	Sports and You	Citroën C3 R5	MON	SWE	MEX	FRA	ARG	POR	ITA	FIN	GER	TUR	GBR	ESP; 14	AUS	NC	0
2022	Pepe López	Hyundai i20 N Rally2	MON	SWE	CRO	POR; WD	ITA	KEN	EST	FIN	BEL	GRE	NZL	ESP; 15	JPN	NC	0
2023	Pepe López	Hyundai i20 N Rally2	MON; 3	SWE	MEX	CRO	POR	ITA	KEN	EST	FIN	GRE	CHL	EUR	JPN	22nd	15
2024	Pepe López	Škoda Fabia RS Rally2	MON; 2	SWE	KEN	CRO; 3	POR; Ret	ITA; WD	POL	LAT	FIN	GRE	CHL	EUR	JPN	15th	33

=== WRC-3 results ===
Year	Entrant	Car	1	2	3	4	5	6	7	8	9	10	11	12	WRC3	Points
2020	Pepe López	Citroën C3 R5	MON; Ret	SWE	MEX	EST	TUR	ITA	MNZ						NC	0
2021	Pepe López	Škoda Fabia R5 Evo	MON	ARC	CRO	POR; Ret	ITA; 2	KEN	EST; 4	BEL; WD	GRE	FIN; 4	ESP; Ret	MNZ	6th	52
