= 2018 Monte Carlo Rally =

2018 Motorsport Event

2018 Monte Carlo Rally 86^{e} Rallye Automobile Monte-Carlo
Round 1 of 13 in the 2018 World Rally Championship
Next event →
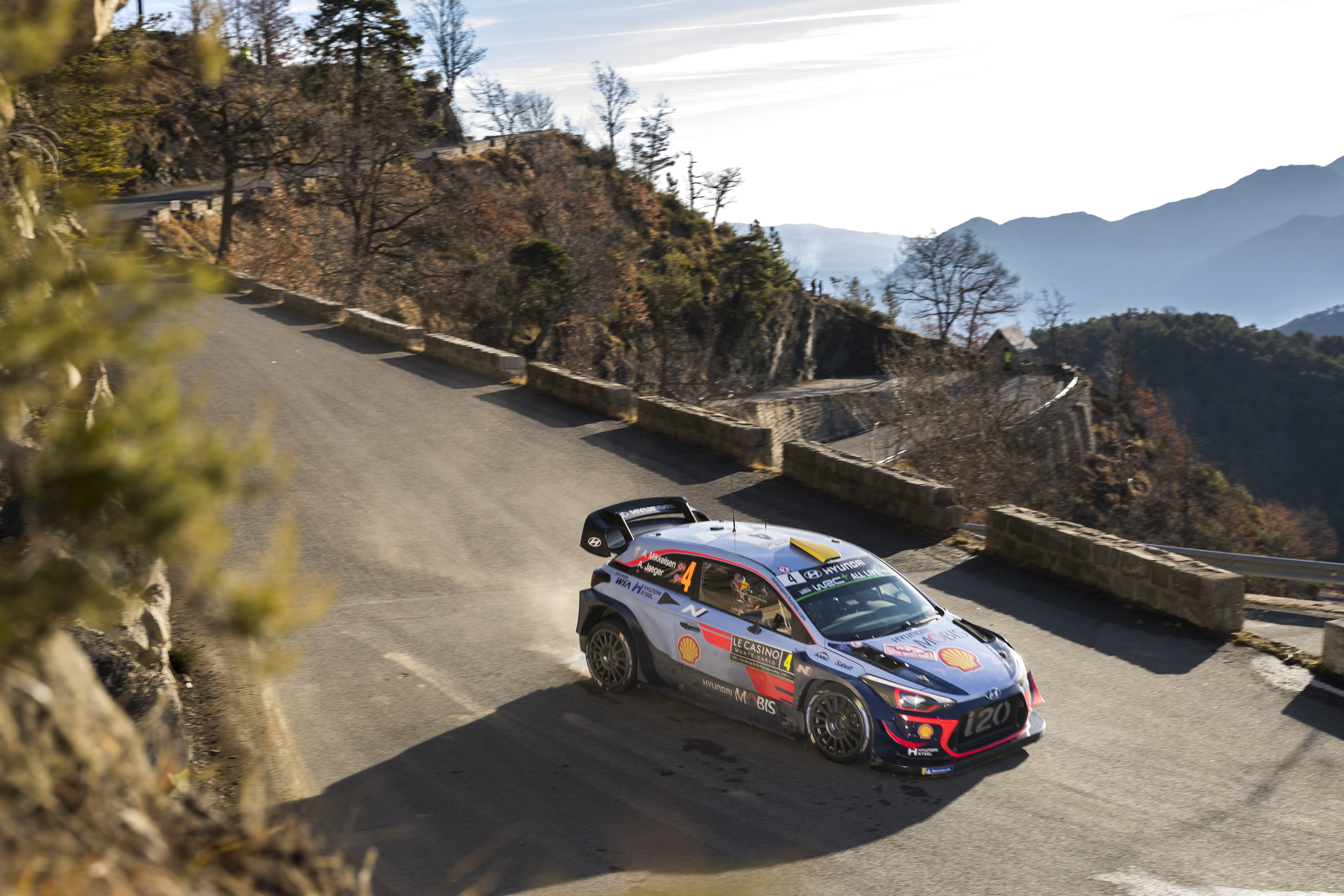
- Hyundai's Andreas Mikkelsen and Anders Jæger-Synnevaag on the Col de Braus mountain pass.
- Host country: Monaco / France
- Rally base: (France) Gap, Hautes-Alpes
- Dates run: 25 – 28 January 2018
- Start location: Casino Square, Monaco
- Finish location: Casino Square, Monaco
- Stages: 17 (394.74 km; 245.28 miles)
- Stage surface: Tarmac and snow
- Transport distance: 1,290.22 km (801.71 miles)
- Overall distance: 1,684.96 km (1,046.99 miles)

Statistics
- Crews registered: 73
- Crews: 67 at start, 47 at finish

Overall results
- Overall winner: (France) Sébastien Ogier (France) Julien Ingrassia (United Kingdom) M-Sport Ford WRT; 4:18:55.5
- Power Stage winner: (United Kingdom) Kris Meeke (Republic of Ireland) Paul Nagle (France) Citroën Total Abu Dhabi WRT

Support category results
- WRC-2 winner: (Czech Republic) Jan Kopecký (Czech Republic) Pavel Dresler (Czech Republic) Škoda Motorsport II; 4:35:38.5
- WRC-3 winner: (Italy) Enrico Brazzoli (Italy) Luca Beltrame (Italy) Enrico Brazzoli; 5:22:03.0

The 2018 Monte Carlo Rally (formally known as the 86^{e} Rallye Automobile Monte-Carlo) was a motor racing event for rally cars that was held over four days between 25 and 28 January 2018. It marked the eighty-sixth running of the Monte Carlo Rally, and was the first round of the 2018 FIA World Rally Championship and its support categories, the WRC-2 and WRC-3 championships. The event, which was based in the town of Gap in the Hautes-Alpes department of France, was contested over seventeen special stages totalling a competitive distance of 394.74 km (245.28 mi).

Reigning World Drivers' and World Co-Drivers Champions Sébastien Ogier and Julien Ingrassia were the defending rally winners. Their team, M-Sport Ford WRT, were the defending manufacturers' winners. Ogier and Ingrassis successfully defended their title to take their sixth win on the event, becoming the second most-successful crew in the event's history. The Škoda Motorsport crew of Jan Kopecký and Pavel Dresler won the World Rally Championship-2 category in a Škoda Fabia R5, while Italian privateers Enrico Brazzoli and Luca Beltrame won the World Rally Championship-3.

== Background ==
=== Entry list ===
The following crews were entered into the rally. The event was open to crews competing in the World Rally Championship, World Rally Championship-2, World Rally Championship-3 and the French national rally championship as well as privateer entries not registered to score points in any championship. The final entry list included twelve crews competing with World Rally Cars, six in the World Rally Championship-2 and four in the World Rally Championship-3.

No.	Entrant	Driver	Co-Driver	Car	Tyre
World Rally Car entries
1	(United Kingdom) M-Sport Ford WRT	(France) Sébastien Ogier	(France) Julien Ingrassia	Ford Fiesta WRC	M
2	(United Kingdom) M-Sport Ford WRT	(United Kingdom) Elfyn Evans	(United Kingdom) Daniel Barritt	Ford Fiesta WRC	M
3	(United Kingdom) M-Sport Ford WRT	(France) Bryan Bouffier	(France) Xavier Panseri	Ford Fiesta WRC	M
4	(South Korea) Hyundai Shell Mobis WRT	(Norway) Andreas Mikkelsen	(Norway) Anders Jæger-Synnevaag	Hyundai i20 Coupe WRC	M
5	(South Korea) Hyundai Shell Mobis WRT	(Belgium) Thierry Neuville	(Belgium) Nicolas Gilsoul	Hyundai i20 Coupe WRC	M
6	(South Korea) Hyundai Shell Mobis WRT	(Spain) Dani Sordo	(Spain) Carlos del Barrio	Hyundai i20 Coupe WRC	M
7	(Japan) Toyota Gazoo Racing WRT	(Finland) Jari-Matti Latvala	(Finland) Miikka Anttila	Toyota Yaris WRC	M
8	(Japan) Toyota Gazoo Racing WRT	(Estonia) Ott Tänak	(Estonia) Martin Järveoja	Toyota Yaris WRC	M
9	(Japan) Toyota Gazoo Racing WRT	(Finland) Esapekka Lappi	(Finland) Janne Ferm	Toyota Yaris WRC	M
10	(France) Citroën Total Abu Dhabi WRT	(United Kingdom) Kris Meeke	(Republic of Ireland) Paul Nagle	Citroën C3 WRC	M
11	(France) Citroën Total Abu Dhabi WRT	(Republic of Ireland) Craig Breen	(United Kingdom) Scott Martin	Citroën C3 WRC	M
18	(Italy) Manuel Villa	(Italy) Manuel Villa	(Italy) Daniele Michi	Ford Fiesta RS WRC	D
World Rally Championship-2 entries
31	(United Kingdom) M-Sport Ford WRT	(France) Eric Camilli	(France) Benjamin Veillas	Ford Fiesta R5	M
32	(Czech Republic) Škoda Motorsport II	(Czech Republic) Jan Kopecký	(Czech Republic) Pavel Dresler	Škoda Fabia R5	M
33	(United Kingdom) M-Sport Ford WRT	(Finland) Teemu Suninen	(Finland) Mikko Markkula	Ford Fiesta R5	M
34	(Netherlands) Kevin Abbring	(Netherlands) Kevin Abbring	(Belgium) Pieter Tsjoen	Ford Fiesta R5	P
35	(Belgium) Guillaume de Mevius	(Belgium) Guillaume de Mevius	(Belgium) Louis Louka	Peugeot 208 T16 R5	M
36	(Italy) Eddie Sciessere	(Italy) Eddie Sciessere	(Italy) Flavio Zanella	Citroën DS3 R5	M
World Rally Championship-3 entries
61	(Italy) Enrico Brazzoli	(Italy) Enrico Brazzoli	(Italy) Luca Beltrame	Peugeot 208 R2	D
62	(Finland) Taisko Lario	(Finland) Taisko Lario	(Finland) Tatu Hämäläinen	Peugeot 208 R2	M
63	(France) Jean-Baptiste Franceschi	(France) Jean-Baptiste Franceschi	(France) Romain Courbon	Ford Fiesta R2T	M
64	(Belgium) Amaury Molle	(Belgium) Amaury Molle	(Belgium) Renaud Herman	Peugeot 208 R2	M
Other major entries
71	(Netherlands) Wevers Sport (Note: Car owned and run by Wevers Sport, entered independently.)	(Norway) Ole Christian Veiby	(Norway) Stig Rune Skjærmoen	Škoda Fabia R5	M
73	(Finland) TGS Worldwide (Note: Car owned and run by TGS Worldwide, entered independently.)	(Finland) Kalle Rovanperä	(Finland) Jonne Halttunen	Škoda Fabia R5	M
76	(Hong Kong) KCMG (Note: Car owned and run by KCMG, entered independently.)	(France) Stéphane Sarrazin	(France) Jacques-Julien Renucci	Hyundai i20 R5	M

=== Route ===
The 2018 rally featured a heavily revised route from the 2017 event, with half the special stages being new additions. The 2018 rally included an additional 12.09 km (7.51 mi) of competitive kilometres compared to the route planned in 2017. It featured a mix of new and returning stages in addition to stages that were reconfigured from previous years. The service park was based in the town of Gap, which also featured parc fermé facilities. The itinerary also featured a short stage called "Gap" that allowed the teams to conduct a pre-event shakedown before the ceremonial start in Monaco.

==== Details ====
The first leg of the rally is the longest, with 213.21 km (132.48 mi) in competitive kilometres. The first two stages—including the famous stage between Sisteron and Thoard, which will be run in reverse as Thoard–Sisteron for the first time in the event's history—will be run on the night of 25 January before the crews return to the service park in Gap. The remaining six stages will be held on 26 January on roads to the west of Gap and features two passes over Vitrolles–Oze, which has featured on the route in previous years; and Roussieux–Eygalayes and Vaumeilh–Claret, both of which are new stages.

The second leg is 117.55 km (73.04 mi) long and is primarily made up of stages east of the town. It features two passes over Agnières-en-Dévoluy–Corps and St.-Leger-les-Mélèzes–La-Bâtie-Neuve, both of which are heavily revised from previous years. The second leg concludes with a pass over Bayons–Bréziers, which was previously run on the first night of competition. After completing service in Gap, the cars return to Monaco.

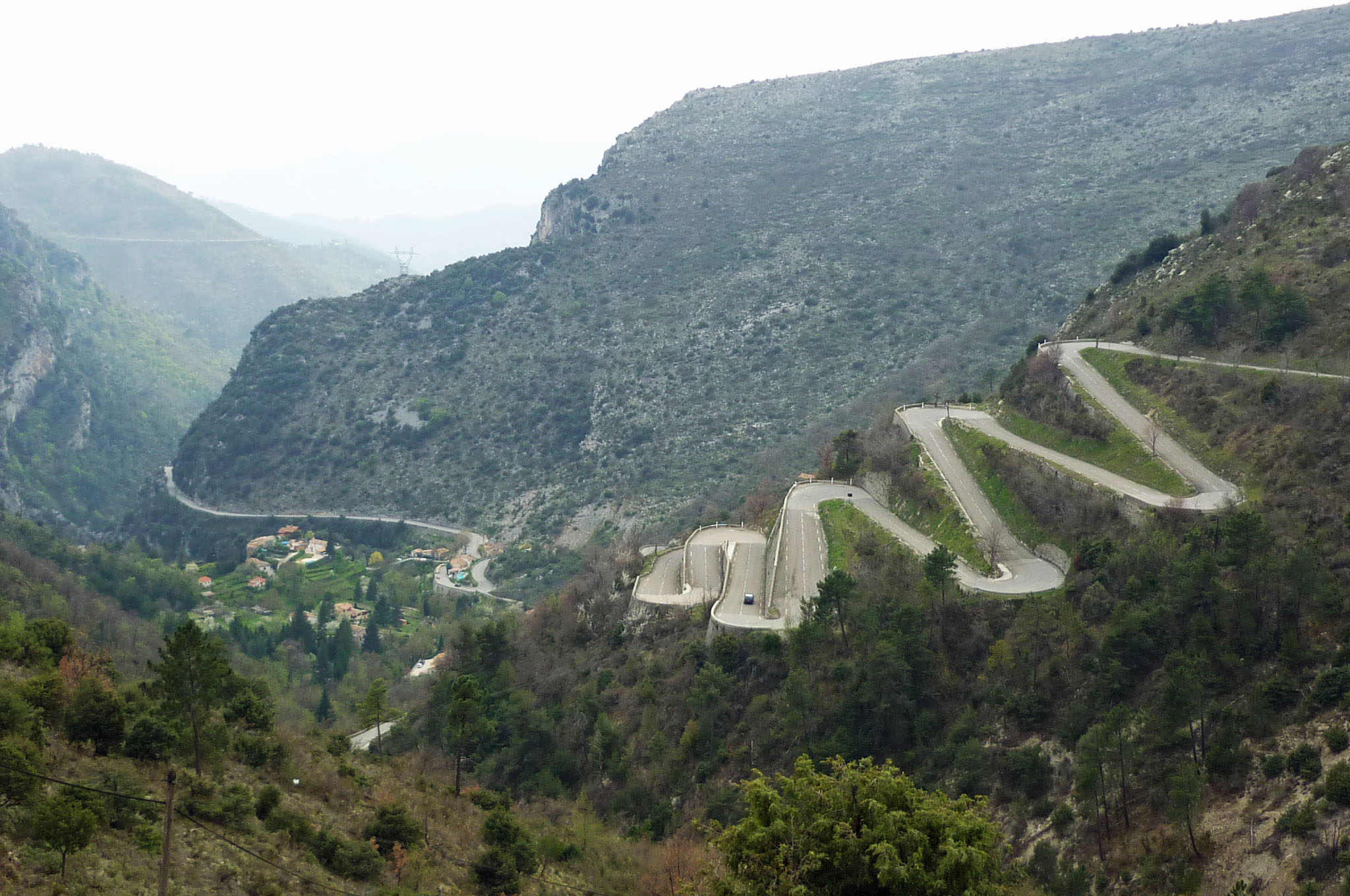
The Col de Braus mountain pass, which was contested as the rally's Power Stage.

The third and final leg is 63.98 km (39.76 mi) long and run on stages in the Alpes-Maritimes department close to the Italian border. The short Lucéram—Col St. Roch stage was replaced by a shortened version of La Bollène-Vésubie–Peïra Cava, which features the Col de Turini and was as the Power Stage in 2017. The new La Cabanette–Col de Braus stage, run as SS15 and again as SS17 will take its place as the Power Stage before the cars return to Monaco once more for the ceremonial finish.

==== Itinerary ====
Date	Time	No.	Stage name	Distance
24 Jan	16:00	—	Gap [Shakedown]	3.35 km
Leg 1 – 213.21 km
25 Jan	18:00	—	Ceremonial start – Casino Square, Monaco	—
25 Jan	21:40	SS1	Thoard–Sisteron	36.58 km
25 Jan	22:51	SS2	Bayons–Bréziers 1	25.49 km
25 Jan	23:45		Service Park – Gap	—
26 Jan	00:45		Parc fermé – Gap	—
26 Jan	08:00		Service Park – Gap	—
26 Jan	08:51	SS3	Vitrolles–Oze 1	26.72 km
26 Jan	10:04	SS4	Roussieux–Eygalayes 1	33.67 km
26 Jan	11:37	SS5	Vaumeilh–Claret 1	15.18 km
26 Jan	12:52		Service Park – Gap	—
26 Jan	13:58	SS6	Vitrolles–Oze 2	26.72 km
26 Jan	15:11	SS7	Roussieux–Eygalayes 2	33.67 km
26 Jan	16:44	SS8	Vaumeilh–Claret 2	15.18 km
26 Jan	17:49		Service Park – Gap	—
26 Jan	18:37		Parc fermé – Gap	—
Leg 2 – 117.55 km
27 Jan	06:57		Service Park – Gap	—
27 Jan	08:08	SS9	Agnières-en-Dévoluy–Corps 1	29.16 km
27 Jan	09:16	SS10	St.-Leger-les-Mélèzes–La-Bâtie-Neuve 1	16.87 km
27 Jan	10:31		Service Park – Gap	—
27 Jan	11:57	SS11	Agnières-en-Dévoluy–Corps 2	29.16 km
27 Jan	13:08	SS12	St.-Leger-les-Mélèzes–La-Bâtie-Neuve 2	16.87 km
27 Jan	14:23		Service Park – Gap	—
27 Jan	16:09	SS13	Bayons–Bréziers 2	25.49 km
27 Jan	17:29		Service Park – Gap	—
27 Jan	22:17		Parc fermé – Monaco	—
Leg 3 – 63.98 km
28 Jan.	09:02	SS14	La Bollène-Vésubie–Peïra Cava 1	18.41 km
28 Jan.	09:38	SS15	La Cabanette–Col de Braus 1	13.58 km
28 Jan.	11:15	SS16	La Bollène-Vésubie–Peïra Cava 2	18.41 km
28 Jan.	12:18	SS17	La Cabanette–Col de Braus 2 [Power Stage]	13.58 km
28 Jan.	13:58		Parc fermé – Monaco	—
28 Jan.	—		Ceremonial finish – Casino Square, Monaco	—

== Report ==
=== Pre-event ===
Jêromé Degout, who was due to compete as Bryan Bouffier's co-driver, was injured during shakedown. He was replaced by Xavier Panseri for the rally.

=== Thursday ===
The opening leg of the rally started on the evening of 25 January and featured two stages: Thoard–Sisteron and the first pass over Bayons–Bréziers. Conditions proved to be difficult as the forecasted rain and snow did not materialise; however, there were icy conditions on the roads in the first few kilometres of Thoard–Sisteron. Several crews struggled, with Thierry Neuville and Nicolas Gilsoul losing four minutes after sliding into a ditch. Ott Tänak and Martin Järveoja also spun, as did Sébastien Ogier and Julien Ingrassia; however, unlike Neuville and Gilsoul, both crews were able to recover quickly. Ogier and Ingrassia went on to win both stages to take the overnight lead ahead of Andreas Mikkelsen and Anders Jæger in second and Dani Sordo and Carlos del Barrio in third.

=== Friday ===
Defending world champion Sébastien Ogier led the rally despite he had a spun today and lost about 40 seconds. Ott Tänak, who was first represent for Toyota Gazoo Racing WRT in 2018 World Rally Championship, was second, 14.9 seconds off the pace. Andreas Mikkelsen, second overnight, conceded the position after overshooting a junction in the opening stage before retiring on the following liaison section with a broken alternator in his Hyundai i20 Coupe WRC. Team-mate Dani Sordo fell back to third and ended 59.7 seconds behind Tänak. Esapekka Lappi and Jari-Matti Latvala were fourth and fifth respectively to complete an impressive showing by the Japanese manufacturer. Thierry Neuville, who dropped over four minutes yesterday after sliding into a snow bank, moved up to ninth and set himself the target of a top-six finish.

=== Saturday ===
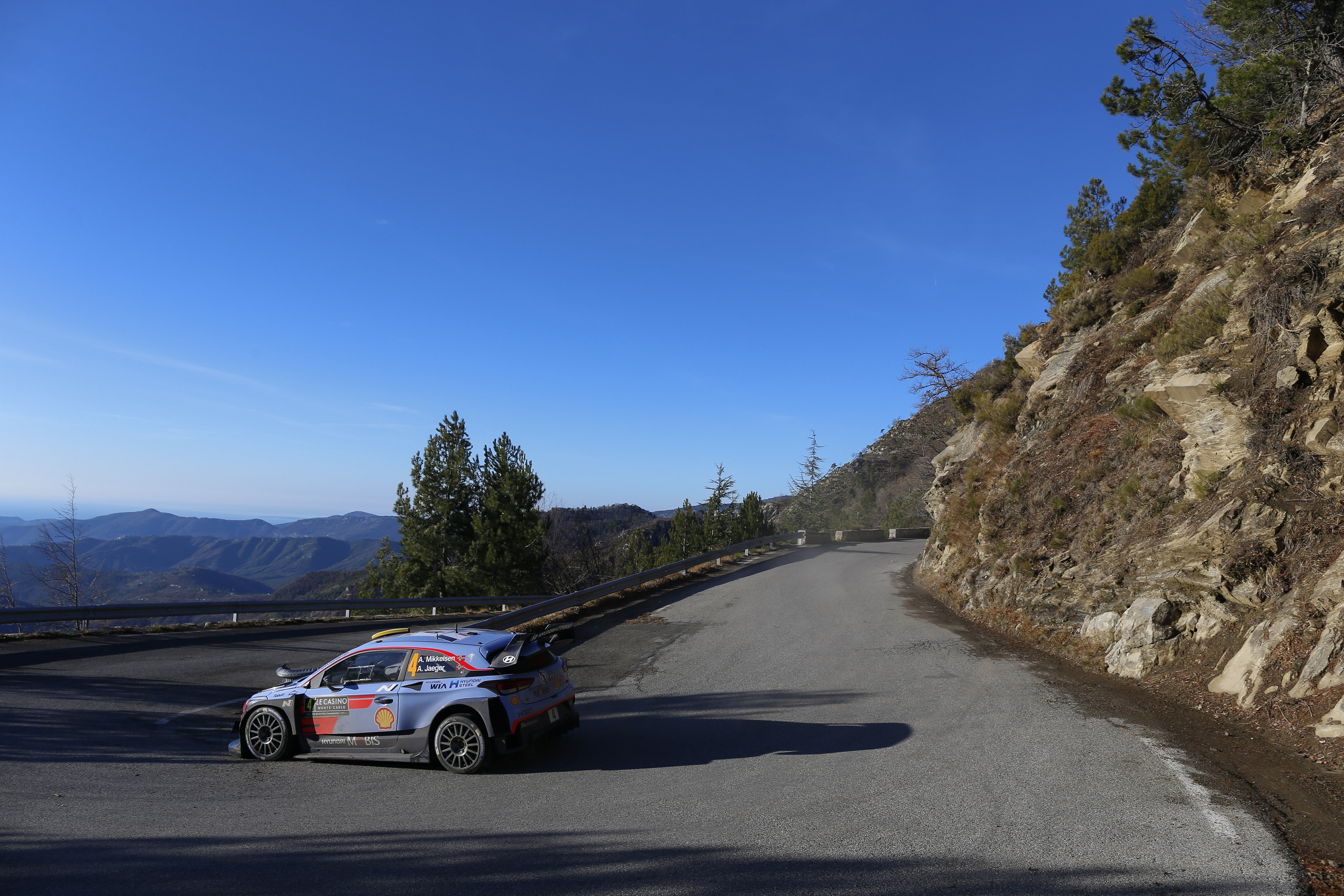
Andreas Mikkelsen and Anders Jæger-Synnevaag in a hairpin bend.

The Frenchman Sébastien Ogier had more than doubled that advantage to Ott Tänak come day's end, the figures do not paint the full picture of a see-saw scrap that at one point saw him more than a minute clear. Jari-Matti Latvala's cause was aided when his rival Dani Sordo crashed out of a podium position on Saturday's first stage. Esapekka Lappi in another Yaris as he moved up the order, with the younger Finn falling behind Britain's Kris Meeke when a mistake precipitated a puncture on SS11. Elfyn Evans sits sixth overnight in his Ford Fiesta, with Hyundai's similarly delayed Thierry Neuville recovering to seventh courtesy of a brace of stage wins on SS12 and SS13. Bryan Bouffier has slipped to eighth in the classification ahead of Citroën's Craig Breen, who suffered for being the "road-sweeper" through the snow of SS9. WRC 2 pace-setter Jan Kopecky completes the overall top ten.

=== Sunday ===
Five-time world champion Sébastien Ogier took the rally victory, recording their fifth win in the event. Ott Tänak and Martin Järveoja finished second, with teammate Jari-Matti Latvala and Miikka Anttila running out of the podium. The Power Stage this time was dominated by Kris Meeke, who salvaged some consolation for Citroën at the end of a troubled weekend with fourth overall – nearly three minutes behind Latvala – and five additional points. Hyundai star Thierry Neuville finished fifth and took four points from the power stage. Elfyn Evans and Esapekka Lappi were sixth and seventh overall, 1.0 second and 3.7 seconds behind the Belgian respectively. Bryan Bouffier came home eighth – the Frenchman losing time in a snow bank on SS16 – with Craig Breen ninth in the second Citroën C3, the Irishman never recovering from a significant time loss as the "snow plow" on Saturday morning. WRC 2 winner Jan Kopecky completed the final top ten.

== Results ==
=== World Rally Cars ===
==== Classification ====
Position		No.	Driver	Co-driver	Entrant	Car	Time	Difference	Points	
Event	Class	No.	Driver	Co-driver	Entrant	Car	Time	Difference	Class	Stage
1	1	1	Sébastien Ogier	Julien Ingrassia	M-Sport Ford WRT	Ford Fiesta WRC	4:18:55.5	0.0	25	1
2	2	8	Ott Tänak	Martin Järveoja	Toyota Gazoo Racing WRT	Toyota Yaris WRC	4:19:53.8	+58.3	18	0
3	3	7	Jari-Matti Latvala	Miikka Anttila	Toyota Gazoo Racing WRT	Toyota Yaris WRC	4:20:47.5	+1:52.0	15	2
4	4	10	Kris Meeke	Paul Nagle	Citroën Total Abu Dhabi WRT	Citroën C3 WRC	4:23:38.6	+4:43.1	12	5
5	5	5	Thierry Neuville	Nicolas Gilsoul	Hyundai Shell Mobis WRT	Hyundai i20 Coupe WRC	4:23:49.3	+4:53.8	10	4
6	6	2	Elfyn Evans	Daniel Barritt	M-Sport Ford WRT	Ford Fiesta WRC	4:23:50.3	+4:54.8	8	0
7	7	9	Esapekka Lappi	Janne Ferm	Toyota Gazoo Racing WRT	Toyota Yaris WRC	4:23:53.0	+4:57.5	6	0
8	8	3	Bryan Bouffier	Xavier Panseri	M-Sport Ford WRT	Ford Fiesta WRC	4:26:35.0	+7:39.5	4	0
9	9	11	Craig Breen	Scott Martin	Citroën Total Abu Dhabi WRT	Citroën C3 WRC	4:28:02.2	+9:06.7	2	0
13	10	4	Andreas Mikkelsen	Anders Jæger-Synnevaag	Hyundai Shell Mobis WRT	Hyundai i20 Coupe WRC	4:55:47.8	+36:52.3	0	3
Retired SS9		6	Dani Sordo	Carlos del Barrio	Hyundai Shell Mobis WRT	Hyundai i20 Coupe WRC	Off-road		0	0

==== Special stages ====
Date	No.	Stage Name	Distance	Winners	Car	Time	Class leaders
25 January	—	Gap [Shakedown]	3.35 km	Neuville / Gilsoul	Hyundai i20 Coupe WRC	2:00.2	—N/a
25 January	SS1	Thoard – Sisteron	36.58 km	Ogier / Ingrassia	Ford Fiesta WRC	23:16.6	Ogier / Ingrassia
25 January	SS2	Bayons – Bréziers 1	25.49 km	Ogier / Ingrassia	Ford Fiesta WRC	14:53.2	Ogier / Ingrassia
26 January	SS3	Vitrolles – Oze 1	26.72 km	Tänak / Järveoja	Toyota Yaris WRC	16:32.3	Ogier / Ingrassia
26 January	SS4	Roussieux–Eygalayes 1	33.67 km	Ogier / Ingrassia	Ford Fiesta WRC	18:25.3	Ogier / Ingrassia
26 January	SS5	Vaumeilh – Claret 1	15.18 km	Evans / Barritt	Ford Fiesta WRC	8:42.6	Ogier / Ingrassia
26 January	SS6	Vitrolles – Oze 2	26.72 km	Tänak / Järveoja	Toyota Yaris WRC	16:45.5	Ogier / Ingrassia
26 January	SS7	Roussieux – Eygalayes 2	33.67 km	Evans / Barritt	Ford Fiesta WRC	19:03.5	Ogier / Ingrassia
26 January	SS8	Vaumeilh – Claret 2	15.18 km	Neuville / Gilsoul	Hyundai i20 Coupe WRC	8:36.2	Ogier / Ingrassia
27 January	SS9	Agnières en Dévoluy – Corps 1	29.16 km	Mikkelsen / Jæger-Synnevaag	Hyundai i20 Coupe WRC	25:11.8	Ogier / Ingrassia
27 January	SS10	St. Leger les Mélèzes – La-Bâtie Neuve 1	16.87 km	Tänak / Järveoja	Toyota Yaris WRC	12:16.8	Ogier / Ingrassia
27 January	SS11	Agnières en Dévoluy – Corps 2	29.16 km	Tänak / Järveoja	Toyota Yaris WRC	19:06.4	Ogier / Ingrassia
27 January	SS12	St. Leger les Mélèzes – La-Bâtie Neuve 2	16.87 km	Neuville / Gilsoul	Hyundai i20 Coupe WRC	10:48.6	Ogier / Ingrassia
27 January	SS13	Bayons – Bréziers 2	25.49 km	Neuville / Gilsoul	Hyundai i20 Coupe WRC	14:32.8	Ogier / Ingrassia
28 January	SS14	La Bollène Vésubie – Peïra Cava 1	18.41 km	Ogier / Ingrassia	Ford Fiesta WRC	13:51.4	Ogier / Ingrassia
28 January	SS15	La Cabarette – Col de Braus 1	13.58 km	Neuville / Gilsoul	Hyundai i20 Coupe WRC	10:34.1	Ogier / Ingrassia
28 January	SS16	La Bollène Vésubie – Peïra Cava 2	18.41 km	Neuville / Gilsoul	Hyundai i20 Coupe WRC	13:07.8	Ogier / Ingrassia
28 January	SS17	La Cabarette – Col de Braus 2 [Power stage]	13.58 km	Meeke / Nagle	Citroën C3 WRC	10:06.7	Ogier / Ingrassia

==== Championship Standings ====
Pos.	Drivers' championships			Co-drivers' championships			Manufacturers' championships		
Pos.	Move	Driver	Points	Move	Co-driver	Points	Move	Manufacturer	Points
1		Sébastien Ogier	26		Julien Ingrassia	26		M-Sport Ford WRT	33
2		Ott Tänak	18		Martin Järveoja	18		Toyota Gazoo Racing WRT	33
3		Jari-Matti Latvala	17		Miikka Anttila	17		Citroën Total Abu Dhabi WRT	18
4		Kris Meeke	17		Paul Nagle	17		Hyundai Shell Mobis WRT	14
5		Thierry Neuville	14		Nicolas Gilsoul	14			

=== World Rally Championship-2 ===
==== Classification ====
Position		No.	Driver	Co-driver	Entrant	Car	Time	Difference	Points	
Event	Class	No.	Driver	Co-driver	Entrant	Car	Time	Difference	Class	Event
10	1	32	Jan Kopecký	Pavel Dresler	Škoda Motorsport	Škoda Fabia R5	4:35:38.5	0.0	25	1
14	2	36	Eddie Sciessere	Flavio Zanella	Eddie Sciessere	Citroën DS3 R5	4:58:26.2	+22:47.7	18	0
18	3	33	Teemu Suninen	Mikko Markkula	M-Sport Ford WRT	Ford Fiesta R5	5:09:09.6	+33:31.1	15	0
19	4	35	Guillaume de Mevius	Louis Louka	Guillaume de Mevius	Peugeot 208 T16	5:09:24.6	+33:46.1	12	0
Retired SS11		31	Eric Camilli	Benjamin Veillas	M-Sport Ford WRT	Ford Fiesta R5	Mechanical		0	0
Retired SS10		34	Kevin Abbring	Pieter Tsjoen	Kevin Abbring	Ford Fiesta R5	Radiator		0	0

==== Special stages ====
Date	No.	Stage name	Distance	Winners	Car	Time	Class leaders
25 January	—	Gap [Shakedown]	3.35 km	Camilli / Veillas	Ford Fiesta R5	2:13.9	—N/a
25 January	SS1	Thoard – Sisteron	36.58 km	Camilli / Veillas	Ford Fiesta R5	24:59.9	Camilli / Veillas
25 January	SS2	Bayons – Bréziers 1	25.49 km	Kopecký / Dresler	Škoda Fabia R5	15:49.3	Camilli / Veillas
26 January	SS3	Vitrolles – Oze 1	26.72 km	Abbring / Tsjoen	Ford Fiesta R5	17:22.1	Camilli / Veillas
26 January	SS4	Roussieux – Eygalayes 1	33.67 km	Kopecký / Dresler	Škoda Fabia R5	19:34.5	Kopecký / Dresler
26 January	SS5	Vaumeilh – Claret 1	15.18 km	Kopecký / Dresler	Škoda Fabia R5	9:08.6	Kopecký / Dresler
26 January	SS6	Vitrolles – Oze 2	26.72 km	Kopecký / Dresler	Škoda Fabia R5	17:42.4	Kopecký / Dresler
26 January	SS7	Roussieux – Eygalayes 2	33.67 km	Kopecký / Dresler	Škoda Fabia R5	20:57.7	Kopecký / Dresler
26 January	SS8	Vaumeilh – Claret 2	15.18 km	Abbring / Tsjoen	Ford Fiesta R5	9:28.5	Kopecký / Dresler
27 January	SS9	Agnières en Dévoluy – Corps 1	29.16 km	Abbring / Tsjoen	Ford Fiesta R5	27:04.7	Kopecký / Dresler
27 January	SS10	St. Leger les Mélèzes – La Bâtie Neuve 1	16.87 km	Camilli / Veillas	Ford Fiesta R5	12:57.5	Kopecký / Dresler
27 January	SS11	Agnières en Dévoluy – Corps 2	29.16 km	Suninen / Markkula	Ford Fiesta R5	19:55.9	Kopecký / Dresler
27 January	SS12	St. Leger les Mélèzes – La Bâtie Neuve 2	16.87 km	Suninen / Markkula	Ford Fiesta R5	11:37.2	Kopecký / Dresler
27 January	SS13	Bayons – Bréziers 2	25.49 km	Suninen / Markkula	Ford Fiesta R5	15:47.2	Kopecký / Dresler
28 January	SS14	La Bollène Vésubie – Peïra Cava 1	18.41 km	Suninen / Markkula	Ford Fiesta R5	14:42.1	Kopecký / Dresler
28 January	SS15	La Cabarette – Col de Braus 1	13.58 km	Suninen / Markkula	Ford Fiesta R5	11:07.6	Kopecký / Dresler
28 January	SS16	La Bollène Vésubie – Peïra Cava 2	18.41 km	Suninen / Markkula	Ford Fiesta R5	14:00.4	Kopecký / Dresler
28 January	SS17	La Cabarette – Col de Braus 2	13.58 km	Kopecký / Dresler	Škoda Fabia R5	10:40.8	Kopecký / Dresler

==== Championship standings ====
Pos.	Drivers' championships			Co-drivers' championships			Teams' championships		
Pos.	Move	Driver	Points	Move	Co-driver	Points	Move	Team	Points
1		Jan Kopecký	25		Pavel Dresler	25		Škoda Motorsport II	25
2		Eddie Sciessere	18		Flavio Zanella	18		M-Sport Ford WRT	18
3		Teemu Suninen	15		Mikko Markkula	15			
4		Guillaume de Meuvius	12		Louis Louka	12			

=== World Rally Championship-3 ===
==== Classification ====
Position		No.	Driver	Co-driver	Entrant	Car	Time	Difference	Points	
Event	Class	No.	Driver	Co-driver	Entrant	Car	Time	Difference	Class	Event
20	1	61	Enrico Brazzoli	Luca Beltrame	Enrico Brazzoli	Peugeot 208 R2	5:22:03.0	0.0	25	0
31	2	64	Amauri Molle	Renaud Herman	Amauri Molle	Peugeot 208 R2	5:44:27.9	+22:44.9	18	0
35	3	62	Taisko Lario	Tatu Hämäläinen	Taisko Lario	Peugeot 208 R2	5:55:00.2	+32:57.2	15	0
Retired SS11		63	Jean-Baptiste Franceschi	Romain Courbon	Jean-Baptiste Franceschi	Ford Fiesta R2T	Off-road		0	0

==== Special stages ====
Date	No.	Stage name	Distance	Winners	Car	Time	Class leaders
25 January	—	Gap [Shakedown]	3.35 km	Franceschi / Courbon	Ford Fiesta R2T	2:31.9	—N/a
25 January	SS1	Thoard – Sisteron	36.58 km	Franceschi / Courbon	Ford Fiesta R2T	28:07.4	Franceschi / Courbon
25 January	SS2	Bayons – Bréziers 1	25.49 km	Franceschi / Courbon	Ford Fiesta R2T	18:29.0	Franceschi / Courbon
26 January	SS3	Vitrolles – Oze 1	26.72 km	Franceschi / Courbon	Ford Fiesta R2T	18:57.8	Franceschi / Courbon
26 January	SS4	Roussieux – Eygalayes 1	33.67 km	Franceschi / Courbon	Ford Fiesta R2T	21:51.0	Franceschi / Courbon
26 January	SS5	Vaumeilh–Claret 1	15.18 km	Franceschi / Courbon	Ford Fiesta R2T	10:11.1	Franceschi / Courbon
26 January	SS6	Vitrolles – Oze 2	26.72 km	Franceschi / Courbon	Ford Fiesta R2T	19:27.5	Franceschi / Courbon
26 January	SS7	Roussieux – Eygalayes 2	33.67 km	Franceschi / Courbon	Ford Fiesta R2T	23:05.8	Franceschi / Courbon
26 January	SS8	Vaumeilh – Claret 2	15.18 km	Franceschi / Courbon	Ford Fiesta R2T	10:11.2	Franceschi / Courbon
27 January	SS9	Agnières en Dévoluy – Corps 1	29.16 km	Franceschi / Courbon	Ford Fiesta R2T	29:32.1	Franceschi / Courbon
27 January	SS10	St. Leger les Mélèzes – La Bâtie Neuve 1	16.87 km	Lario / Hämäläinen	Peugeot 208 R2	13:42.1	Franceschi / Courbon
27 January	SS11	Agnières en Dévoluy – Corps 2	29.16 km	Brazzoli / Beltrame	Peugeot 208 R2	23:46.9	Brazzoli / Beltrame
27 January	SS12	St. Leger les Mélèzes – La Bâtie Neuve 2	16.87 km	Lario / Hämäläinen	Peugeot 208 R2	13:16.5	Brazzoli / Beltrame
27 January	SS13	Bayons – Bréziers 2	25.49 km	Lario / Hämäläinen	Peugeot 208 R2	18:44.5	Brazzoli / Beltrame
28 January	SS14	La Bollène Vésubie – Peïra Cava 1	18.41 km	Lario / Hämäläinen	Peugeot 208 R2	16:32.6	Brazzoli / Beltrame
28 January	SS15	La Cabarette – Col de Braus 1	13.58 km	Brazzoli / Beltrame	Peugeot 208 R2	12:55.4	Brazzoli / Beltrame
28 January	SS16	La Bollène Vésubie – Peïra Cava 2	18.41 km	Lario / Hämäläinen	Peugeot 208 R2	15:57.0	Brazzoli / Beltrame
28 January	SS17	La Cabarette – Col de Braus 2	13.58 km	Brazzoli / Beltrame	Peugeot 208 R2	12:35.7	Brazzoli / Beltrame

==== Championship standings ====
Pos.	Drivers' championships			Co-drivers' championships		
Pos.	Move	Driver	Points	Move	Co-driver	Points
1		Enrico Brazzoli	25		Luca Beltrame	25
2		Amaury Molle	18		Renaud Herman	18
3		Taisko Lario	15		Tatu Hämäläinen	15

== Notes ==
Previous rally: 2017 Rally Australia (2017)	2018 FIA World Rally Championship	Next rally: 2018 Rally Sweden
Previous rally: 2017 Monte Carlo Rally	2018 Monte Carlo Rally	Next rally: 2019 Monte Carlo Rally
