= Power Stage =

World Rally Championship special stage

The Power Stage (abbreviated as PS) is a special stage that usually runs as the final stage of a rally in the World Rally Championship (WRC) (Note: 2018 Wales Rally GB used fourth to last stage as the power stage.) and European Rally Championship (ERC). Additional championship points are available to the fastest five crews through the stage regardless of where they actually finished in the rally. Unlike normal special stages, which are timed to a tenth of a second, the timing of the Power Stage is to a thousandth of a second.

== Points scoring systems ==
The bonus scoring system initially used at the 1999 Tour de Corse and 1999 Rally Finland, branded as the "TV stage". Drivers that had retired from the event could take part in the TV stage.

Re-introduced in 2011, the top three crews through the stage could score extra bonus points, with the fastest crew receiving three points, the second-fastest receiving two points, and the third-fastest receiving one point. In 2017, the scoring system was amended so the five fastest drivers through the stage were awarded points from five for first to one for fifth. Manufacturers, WRC-2 and WRC-3 categories were also eligible to score Power Stage points in 2021. From 2022, WRC-2 awarded Power Stage points from three for first place, to one for third place. However, it was axed from 2024 onwards. Power Stage points are no longer awarded in WRC-3.

Power Stages were also introduced during the 2022 European Rally Championship, using the final stage of each rally and awarding points to the five fastest crews in a similar fashion to the WRC.

Seasons	Category	1st	2nd	3rd	4th	5th
1999, 2011–2016	WRC	3	2	1		
2017–present	WRC	5	4	3	2	1
2022–2023	WRC-2	3	2	1		
2022–present	ERC	5	4	3	2	1

== Cancelled Power Stages ==
This list does not include cancelled rallies.

No.	Rally	Stage name	Reason	Ref
1.	(Monaco) 2013 Monte Carlo Rally	Lantosque – Lucéram 2	Increase in local traffic due to bad weather.	
2.	2020 Rally Mexico	El Brinco	The rally ended prematurely in response to increased travel restrictions stemming from the COVID-19 pandemic.	

== Most wins in WRC ==
Key
**Bold**	Drivers or co-drivers active in the World Rally Championship
	World Rally Championship Drivers' or Co-Drivers' champions

=== By drivers ===
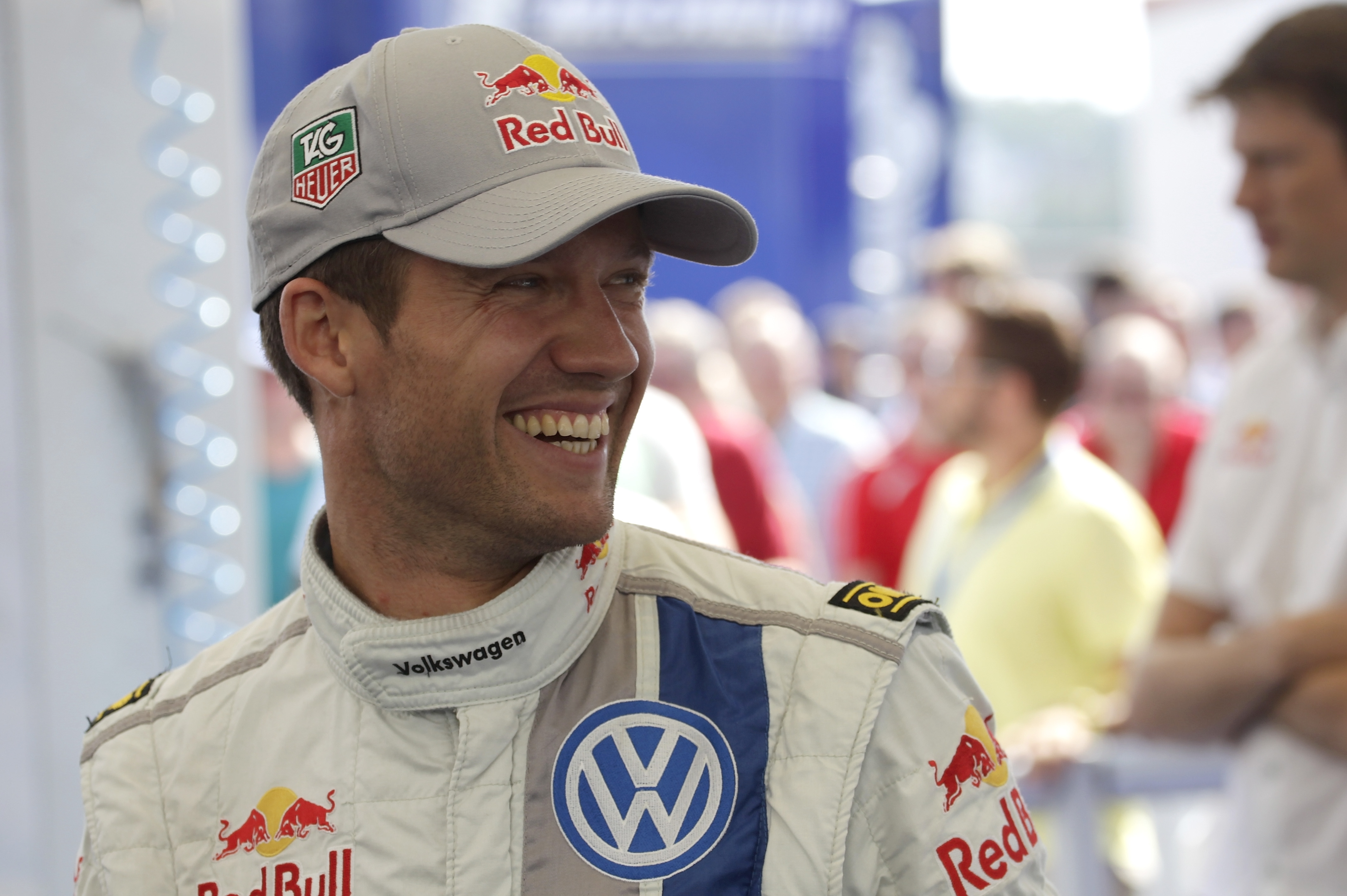
Eight-time world champion Sébastien Ogier has the most Power Stage victories.

No.	Driver	Active years	Wins	First win	Last win
1.	**(France) Sébastien Ogier**	2008–present	51	2011 Rally Sweden	(Greece) 2026 Acropolis Rally
2.	**(Belgium) Thierry Neuville**	2009–2010, 2012–present	29	2013 Rally Finland	(Italy) 2026 Rally Italia Sardegna
3.	(Estonia) Ott Tänak	2009–2012, 2014–2025	23	2012 Rallye de France	2025 Rally de Portugal
4.	(Finland) Kalle Rovanperä	2017–2025	22	2020 Rally Sweden	2025 Rally Finland
5.	**(Finland) Jari-Matti Latvala**	2002–2020, 2023–present	15	2011 Rallye de France	2018 Wales Rally GB
6.	**(United Kingdom) Elfyn Evans**	2007, 2011, 2013–present	9	(Germany) 2014 Rallye Deutschland	2026 Rally Finland
7.	(France) Sébastien Loeb	1999–2013, 2015, 2018–2020, 2022	7	2011 Rally de Portugal	(Germany) 2012 Rallye Deutschland
8.	(United Kingdom) (Andorra) Kris Meeke	2002–2008, 2011, 2013–2019	6	(Catalonia) 2011 Rally Catalunya	(France) 2019 Tour de Corse
8.	**(Sweden) Oliver Solberg**	2019–present	6	(Kenya) 2026 Safari Rally	2026 Rally Chile
10.	(Finland) Mikko Hirvonen	2002–2014	5	(Mexico) 2011 Rally México	2012 Wales Rally GB
10.	(Spain) Dani Sordo	2003–2024	5	2012 Rally de Portugal	(Catalonia) 2021 Rally Catalunya
10.	(Finland) Esapekka Lappi	2011–2013, 2015–2024	5	(Italy) 2017 Rally Italia Sardegna	2023 Rally Sweden
13.	(Norway) Petter Solberg	1998–2012, 2018–2019	4	2011 Rally Argentina	(Italy) 2012 Rally Italia Sardegna
13.	**(France) Adrien Fourmaux**	2009–present	4	2024 Croatia Rally	2026 Rally de Portugal
15.	(Norway) Andreas Mikkelsen	2006–2024	3	(Italy) 2014 Rally Italia Sardegna	(Italy) 2019 Rally Italia Sardegna
15.	**(Japan) Takamoto Katsuta**	2016–present	3	(Italy) 2020 Rally Monza	(Europe) 2024 Central European Rally
17.	(France) Didier Auriol	1984–2003, 2005	2	(France) 1999 Tour de Corse	1999 Rally Finland
18.	(Norway) Mads Østberg	2006–2021	1	2014 Rally Sweden	2014 Rally Sweden
18.	(New Zealand) Hayden Paddon	2007–2019, 2022	1	2016 Rally Argentina	2016 Rally Argentina
18.	(Republic of Ireland) Craig Breen	2009–2012, 2014–2023	1	2022 Rally Japan	2022 Rally Japan
Notes: (Note: Statistics updated as of the 2026 Rally Chile.)

=== By co-drivers ===
No.	Co-Driver	Active years	Wins	First win	Last win
1.	(France) Julien Ingrassia	2008–2021	41	2011 Rally Sweden	2021 Croatia Rally
2.	(Finland) Jonne Halttunen	2011–2014, 2017–2025	22	2020 Rally Sweden	2025 Rally Finland
3.	(Estonia) Martin Järveoja	2010–2025	21	2017 Rally de Portugal	2025 Rally de Portugal
4.	(Finland) Miikka Anttila	1999–2020	15	2011 Rallye de France	2018 Wales Rally GB
4.	(Belgium) Nicolas Gilsoul	2007–2008, 2012–2020, 2023	15	2013 Rally Finland	2020 Rally Turkey
6.	**(Belgium) Martijn Wydaeghe**	2013–2019, 2021–present	14	(Italy) 2021 Rally Italia Sardegna	(Italy) 2026 Rally Italia Sardegna
7.	**(France) Vincent Landais**	2012–present	9	2023 Rally Mexico	(Greece) 2026 Acropolis Rally
8.	**(United Kingdom) Scott Martin**	2004–present	8	2021 Rally Finland	2026 Rally Finland
9.	(Monaco) Daniel Elena	1998–2013, 2015, 2018–2020	7	2011 Rally de Portugal	(Germany) 2012 Rallye Deutschland
10.	**(United Kingdom) Elliott Edmondson**	2013, 2015–present	6	(Kenya) 2026 Safari Rally	2026 Rally Chile
11.	(Finland) Jarmo Lehtinen	1997–2014, 2018–2020	5	(Mexico) 2011 Rally México	2012 Wales Rally GB
11.	(Finland) Janne Ferm	2011–2013, 2015–2024	5	(Italy) 2017 Rally Italia Sardegna	2023 Rally Sweden
13.	(United Kingdom) / (Republic of Ireland) Chris Patterson	1993, 1997–2018, 2021	4	2011 Rally Argentina	(Italy) 2012 Rally Italia Sardegna
13.	(Republic of Ireland) Paul Nagle	2004, 2006–2008, 2011–2022	4	(Spain) 2011 Rally Catalunya	(Monaco) 2018 Monte Carlo Rally
13.	**(France) Alexandre Coria**	2016, 2019, 2021–present	4	2024 Croatia Rally	2026 Rally de Portugal
16.	(France) Denis Giraudet	1981–1984, 1989, 1991–1993, 1995–2017, 2019	2	(France) 1999 Tour de Corse	1999 Rally Finland
16.	(Spain) Carlos del Barrio	1991–1992, 1994–2000, 2002, 2004–2007, 2010–2014, 2018–2022	2	2012 Rally de Portugal	2013 Rallye de France-Alsace
16.	(Norway) Ola Fløene	1995, 2000–2019, 2021	2	(Italy) 2014 Rally Italia Sardegna	(Catalonia) 2015 Rally Catalunya
16.	(Spain) Marc Martí	1992–1993, 1995–2010, 2012, 2014–2022	2	(Germany) 2017 Rallye Deutschland	(Catalonia) 2017 Rally Catalunya
16.	(United Kingdom) Sebastian Marshall	2008, 2010–2019, 2021	2	(Monaco) 2019 Monte Carlo Rally	(France) 2019 Tour de Corse
16.	(United Kingdom) Daniel Barritt	2000, 2002–2021	2	(Germany) 2014 Rallye Deutschland	(Italy) 2020 Rally Monza
16.	**(Sweden) Jonas Andersson**	2002–present	2	2014 Rally Sweden	(Sweden) 2024 Rally Finland
16.	**(Republic of Ireland) Aaron Johnston**	2019–present	2	2024 Rally Finland	(Europe) 2024 Central European Rally
24.	(Estonia) Kuldar Sikk	2003–2015, 2017–2020	1	2012 Rallye de France	2012 Rallye de France
24.	(New Zealand) John Kennard	1985, 1987–1989, 1991, 1998, 2007–2017, 2019, 2022	1	2016 Rally Argentina	2016 Rally Argentina
24.	(Estonia) Raigo Mõlder	2009, 2014–2016, 2020	1	2016 Wales Rally GB	2016 Wales Rally GB
24.	(Norway) Anders Jæger-Amland	2014–2020	1	(Italy) 2019 Rally Italia Sardegna	(Italy) 2019 Rally Italia Sardegna
24.	**(Spain) Cándido Carrera**	2010–2016, 2018–2019, 2021–present	1	(Catalonia) 2021 Rally Catalunya	(Catalonia) 2021 Rally Catalunya
24.	(France) Benjamin Veillas	1999, 2008, 2015–2019, 2021–2024	1	(Catalonia) 2022 Rally Catalunya	(Catalonia) 2022 Rally Catalunya
24.	**(Republic of Ireland) James Fulton**	2020–present	1	2022 Rally Japan	2022 Rally Japan

=== Most wins per season ===
Key
**Bold**	Won the World Championship in the same year

Year	Driver(s)	Wins	Races
1999	(France) Didier Auriol	2	2 (Note: 1999 consisted of 14 rallies, but Power Stage was only run on two.)
2011	(France) Sébastien Ogier	4	13
2012	(France) **Sébastien Loeb**	4	13
2013	(France) **Sébastien Ogier**	7	12 (Note: 2013 consisted of 13 rallies, but Power Stage was cancelled in Monte Carlo.)
2014	(France) **Sébastien Ogier**	6	13
2015	(France) **Sébastien Ogier**	9	13
2016	(France) **Sébastien Ogier**	7	13
2017	(Belgium) Thierry Neuville	4	13
2018	(Belgium) Thierry Neuville (Estonia) Ott Tänak (Finland) Esapekka Lappi	3	13
2019	(Estonia) **Ott Tänak**	6	13
2020	(Belgium) Thierry Neuville (Finland) Kalle Rovanperä	2	6 (Note: 2020 consisted of seven rallies, but Power Stage was cancelled in Mexico.)
2021	(Estonia) Ott Tänak	4	12
2022	(Finland) **Kalle Rovanperä**	7	13
2023	(Finland) **Kalle Rovanperä**	6	13
2024	(Belgium) **Thierry Neuville**	5	13
2025	(France) **Sébastien Ogier**	5	14
2026	(Sweden) Oliver Solberg	6	13

== Points scored in WRC ==
Key
**Bold**	Drivers or co-drivers active in the World Rally Championship
	World Rally Championship Drivers' or Co-Drivers' champions

=== By drivers ===
No.	Driver	Active years	Times	First score	Last score	Points
1.	**(France) Sébastien Ogier**	2008–present	132	2011 Rally Sweden	2026 Rally Chile	392
2.	**(Belgium) Thierry Neuville**	2009–2010, 2012–present	112	2012 Rallye de France	(Italy) 2026 Rally Italia Sardegna	355
3.	(Estonia) Ott Tänak	2009–2012, 2014–2025	82	2012 Rally de Portugal	2025 Rally Saudi Arabia	275
4.	**(United Kingdom) Elfyn Evans**	2007, 2011, 2013–present	80	(Germany) 2014 Rallye Deutschland	(Italy) 2026 Rally Italia Sardegna	229
5.	(Finland) Kalle Rovanperä	2017–2025	49	2020 Rally Sweden	2025 Rally Saudi Arabia	194
6.	(Finland) **Jari-Matti Latvala**	2002-2020, 2023–present	72	2011 Rally Sweden	2023 Rally Finland	154
7.	**(Japan) Takamoto Katsuta**	2016–present	40	(Italy) 2020 Rally Monza	(Italy) 2026 Rally Italia Sardegna	87
8.	(Finland) **Esapekka Lappi**	2011–2013, 2015–2024, 2026–present	27	2017 Rally de Portugal	2026 Rally Sweden	79
9.	(Spain) Dani Sordo	2003–2024	36	2011 Rallye de France	(Greece) 2023 Acropolis Rally	75
10.	(Norway) Andreas Mikkelsen	2006–2024	30	(Germany) 2012 Rallye Deutschland	2024 Rally Japan	62
11.	(France) Sébastien Loeb	1999–2013, 2015, 2018–2020, 2022	27	2011 Rally Sweden	(Kenya) 2022 Safari Rally	57
12.	(United Kingdom) (Andorra) Kris Meeke	2002–2008, 2011, 2013–2019	23	(Catalonia) 2011 Rally Catalunya	(Germany) 2019 Rallye Deutschland	55
13.	**(Sweden) Oliver Solberg**	2019–present	12	2022 Rally New Zealand	2026 Rally Chile	47
14.	(France) **Adrien Fourmaux**	2022–present	17	(Kenya) 2022 Safari Rally	(Italy) 2026 Rally Italia Sardegna	44
15.	(Finland) Mikko Hirvonen	2002–2014	17	2011 Rally Mexico	(Germany) 2014 Rallye Deutschland	43
16.	(Republic of Ireland) Craig Breen	2009–2012, 2014–2023	14	(France) 2017 Tour de Corse	2023 Rally Sweden	32
17.	(Norway) Mads Østberg	2006–2021	12	(Mexico) 2012 Rally México	(Italy) 2023 Rally Italia Sardegna	25
18.	(Finland) Teemu Suninen	2014–2024	9	2018 Rally de Portugal	2023 Rally Finland	22
18.	**(Finland) Sami Pajari**	2019–present	10	(Kenya) 2025 Safari Rally	(Italy) 2026 Rally Italia Sardegna	22
20.	(Norway) Petter Solberg	1998–2012, 2018–2019	10	(Mexico) 2011 Rally México	(Italy) 2012 Rally Italia Sardegna	21
21.	(New Zealand) Hayden Paddon	2007–2019, 2022	4	2016 Rally Mexico	2017 Rally Sweden	7
22.	(France) Didier Auriol	1984–2003, 2005	2	(France) 1999 Tour de Corse	1999 Rally Finland	6
22.	(Finland) Juho Hänninen	2006–2011, 2013–2015, 2017, 2023	4	(Monaco) 2017 Monte Carlo Rally	2013 Rally Finland	6
22.	(Russia) Evgeny Novikov	2007–2009, 2011–2013	4	(Monaco) 2012 Monte Carlo Rally	2013 Wales Rally GB	6
22.	(France) Stéphane Lefebvre	2013–2024	2	(Monaco) 2017 Monte Carlo Rally	2017 Rally Poland	6
26.	(Finland) Tommi Mäkinen	1987–2003	2	(France) 1999 Tour de Corse	1999 Rally Finland	4
26.	(United Kingdom) **Gus Greensmith**	2022–present	2	(Kenya) 2022 Safari Rally	(Greece) 2022 Acropolis Rally	4
26.	**(Italy) Mauro Miele**	2018–present	1	2022 Rally Japan	2022 Rally Japan	4
29.	(Poland) Robert Kubica	2013–2016	2	(France) 2015 Tour de Corse	2015 Wales Rally GB	3
29.	**(Luxembourg) Grégoire Munster**	2019–present	2	(Kenya) 2025 Safari Rally	2025 Rally Japan	3
32.	(Republic of Ireland) **Jon Armstrong**	2026–present	1	2026 Croatia Rally	2026 Croatia Rally	3
32.	(Netherlands) Kevin Abbring	2007–2012, 2014–2018, 2020–2021	1	(Italy) 2016 Rally Italia Sardegna	(Italy) 2016 Rally Italia Sardegna	2
33.	(Spain) Carlos Sainz	1987–2005	1	(France) 1999 Tour de Corse	(France) 1999 Tour de Corse	1
33.	(Finland) Toni Gardemeister	1996–2008, 2010	1	1999 Rally Finland	1999 Rally Finland	1
33.	(Qatar) Nasser Al-Attiyah	2004–2015	1	2012 Rally Argentina	2012 Rally Argentina	1
33.	(France) **Yohan Rossel**	2014–2017, 2019–present	1	(Monaco) 2026 Monte Carlo Rally	(Monaco) 2026 Monte Carlo Rally	1
33.	**(Paraguay) Fabrizio Zaldivar**	2019–present	1	2022 Rally Japan	2022 Rally Japan	1
33.	(Finland) **Emil Lindholm**	2022–present	1	2022 Croatia Rally	2022 Croatia Rally	1

=== By co-drivers ===
No.	Co-Driver	Active years	Times	First score	Last score	Points
1.	(France) Julien Ingrassia	2008–2021	96	2011 Rally Sweden	(Italy) 2021 Rally Monza	276
2.	(Estonia) Martin Järveoja	2010–2025	78	2017 Rally Mexico	2025 Rally Saudi Arabia	266
3.	**(United Kingdom) Scott Martin**	2004–present	73	(France) 2017 Tour de Corse	(Italy) 2026 Rally Italia Sardegna	211
4.	**(Belgium) Martijn Wydaeghe**	2013–2019, 2021–present	58	(Monaco) 2021 Monte Carlo Rally	(Italy) 2026 Rally Italia Sardegna	196
5.	(Finland) Jonne Halttunen	2011–2014, 2017–2025	49	2020 Rally Sweden	2025 Rally Saudi Arabia	194
6.	(Belgium) Nicolas Gilsoul	2007–2008, 2012–2020, 2023	53	2012 Rallye de France	(Italy) 2020 Rally Italia Sardegna	159
7.	(Finland) Miikka Anttila	1999–2020	71	2011 Rally Sweden	2019 Rally Turkey	153
8.	**(France) Vincent Landais**	2012–present	32	(Monaco) 2023 Monte Carlo Rally	2026 Rally Chile	104
9.	**(Republic of Ireland) Aaron Johnston**	2019–present	38	2021 Rally Finland	(Italy) 2026 Rally Italia Sardegna	83
10.	(Finland) Janne Ferm	2011–2013, 2015–present	26	2017 Rally de Portugal	2024 Rally Finland	78
11.	(Republic of Ireland) Paul Nagle	2004, 2006–2008, 2011–2022	25	(Catalonia) 2011 Rally Catalunya	(Greece) 2022 Acropolis Rally	57
12.	(Finland) Jarmo Lehtinen	1997–2014, 2018–2020	20	2011 Rally Mexico	(Monaco) 2020 Monte Carlo Rally	51
12.	(Monaco) Daniel Elena	1998–2013, 2015, 2018–2020	24	2011 Rally Sweden	2020 Rally Turkey	51
14.	**(United Kingdom) Elliott Edmondson**	2013, 2015–present	12	2022 Rally New Zealand	2026 Rally Chile	47
15.	(France) **Alexandre Coria**	2022–present	17	(Kenya) 2022 Safari Rally	(Italy) 2026 Rally Italia Sardegna	44
16.	(Norway) Anders Jæger-Amland	2014–2020	15	(Monaco) 2016 Monte Carlo Rally	2019 Rally Finland	35
17.	(United Kingdom) Daniel Barritt	2000, 2002–2021	12	(Germany) 2014 Rallye Deutschland	(Italy) 2020 Rally Monza	30
16.	**(Spain) Carlos del Barrio**	1991–1992, 1994–2000, 2002, 2004–2007, 2010–2014, 2018–present	15	2011 Rallye de France	(Monaco) 2021 Monte Carlo Rally	30
19.	**(Finland) Marko Salminen**	2008, 2011–2021, 2023–present	13	(Monaco) 2019 Monte Carlo Rally	(Italy) 2026 Rally Italia Sardegna	28
20.	**(Spain) Marc Martí**	1992–1993, 1995–2010, 2012, 2014–present	12	2015 Rally Argentina	(Catalonia) 2017 Rally Catalunya	27
21.	(United Kingdom) / (Republic of Ireland) Chris Patterson	1993, 1997–2018, 2021	10	(Mexico) 2011 Rally México	(Italy) 2012 Rally Italia Sardegna	21
22.	(United Kingdom) Sebastian Marshall	2008, 2010–2019, 2021	6	(Italy) 2016 Rally Italia Sardegna	(Germany) 2019 Rallye Deutschland	19
23.	(Norway) Ola Fløene	1995, 2000–2019, 2021	10	(Italy) 2014 Rally Italia Sardegna	2015 Wales Rally GB	17
24.	**(Sweden) Jonas Andersson**	2002–present	14	(Mexico) 2012 Rally México	(Greece) 2022 Acropolis Rally	16
24.	**(Spain) Cándido Carrera**	2010–2016, 2018–2019, 2021–present	6	(Catalonia) 2021 Rally Catalunya	(Greece) 2023 Acropolis Rally	16
26.	(Norway) Torstein Eriksen	2011–2012, 2015, 2017–2024	5	2018 Rally Finland	2024 Rally Japan	15
27.	(France) Benjamin Veillas	1999, 2008, 2015–2019, 2021–2023	4	2022 Croatia Rally	(Catalonia) 2022 Rally Catalunya	12
28.	**(Finland) Mikko Markkula**	2001–2019, 2021–present	3	2018 Rally de Portugal	2023 Rally Finland	8
28.	**(Republic of Ireland) James Fulton**	2020–present	3	2022 Rally Japan	2026 Rally Chile	8
30.	(France) Denis Giraudet	1981–1984, 1989, 1991–1993, 1995–2017, 2019	3	(France) 1999 Tour de Corse	(Monaco) 2012 Monte Carlo Rally	7
30.	(New Zealand) John Kennard	1985, 1987–1989, 1991, 1998, 2007–2017, 2019, 2022	4	2016 Rally Mexico	2017 Rally Sweden	7
32.	(France) Gabin Moreau	2013–2018	2	(Monaco) 2017 Monte Carlo Rally	2017 Rally Poland	6
32.	(France) Isabelle Galmiche	2007, 2013, 2017, 2022	2	(Monaco) 2022 Monte Carlo Rally	(Kenya) 2022 Safari Rally	6
34.	**(Austria) Ilka Minor**	1997–2007, 2010–2016, 2018–present	3	(Greece) 2013 Acropolis Rally	2013 Wales Rally GB	5
34.	(Estonia) Raigo Mõlder	2009, 2014–2016, 2020	2	2015 Rally Poland	2016 Wales Rally GB	5
34.	(Finland) Kaj Lindström	1996–2006, 2009–2015, 2017, 2019	3	(Monaco) 2017 Monte Carlo Rally	(Catalonia) 2017 Rally Catalunya	5
37.	(Finland) Risto Mannisenmäki	1982, 1986–1990, 1992–2001, 2003	2	(France) 1999 Tour de Corse	1999 Rally Finland	4
37.	(Estonia) Kuldar Sikk	2003–2015, 2017–2020	2	2012 Rally de Portugal	2012 Rallye de France	4
37.	**(Italy) Luca Beltrame**	2007, 2017–present	1	2022 Rally Japan	2022 Rally Japan	4
40.	**(Belgium) Louis Louka**	2019–present	2	(Kenya) 2025 Safari Rally	2025 Rally Japan	3
40.	**(Poland) Maciej Szczepaniak**	1999–2000, 2002–2003, 2006–present	2	(France) 2015 Tour de Corse	2015 Wales Rally GB	3
40.	(Republic of Ireland) **Shane Byrne**	2026–present	1	2026 Croatia Rally	2026 Croatia Rally	3
43.	**(Spain) Borja Rozada**	2007, 2009–2018, 2020–present	2	(Italy) 2021 Rally Italia Sardegna	(Kenya) 2021 Safari Rally	2
44.	(Spain) Luis Moya	1988–2002	1	(France) 1999 Tour de Corse	(France) 1999 Tour de Corse	1
44.	(Finland) Paavo Lukander	1996–2004	1	1999 Rally Finland	1999 Rally Finland	1
44.	(Italy) Giovanni Bernacchini	1998–2017, 2020	1	2012 Rally Argentina	2012 Rally Argentina	1
44.	**(Italy) Marcelo Der Ohannesian**	2011, 2015, 2018–present	1	2022 Rally Japan	2022 Rally Japan	1
44.	(Finland) **Enni Mälkönen**	2012–present	1	2026 Rally Sweden	2026 Rally Sweden	1
44.	**(France) Arnaud Dunand**	2014-2015, 2017–present	1	(Monaco) 2026 Monte Carlo Rally	(Monaco) 2026 Monte Carlo Rally	1
44.	(Finland) **Reeta Hämäläinen**	2022–present	1	2022 Croatia Rally	2022 Croatia Rally	1

=== Most points per season ===
Key
**Bold**	Won the World Championship in the same year

Year	Driver(s)	Points	Races
1999	(France) Didier Auriol	6	2
2011	(France) **Sébastien Loeb**	19	13
2012	(France) **Sébastien Loeb**	19	13
2013	(France) **Sébastien Ogier**	28	12
2014	(Finland) Jari-Matti Latvala	25	13
2015	(France) **Sébastien Ogier**	27	13
2016	(France) **Sébastien Ogier**	26	13
2017	(France) **Sébastien Ogier** (Belgium) Thierry Neuville	34	13
2018	(France) **Sébastien Ogier**	37	13
2019	(France) Sébastien Ogier	41	13
2020	(Estonia) Ott Tänak (Belgium) Thierry Neuville	18	6
2021	(Belgium) Thierry Neuville	35	12
2022	(Finland) **Kalle Rovanperä**	50	13
2023	(Finland) **Kalle Rovanperä**	43	13
2024	(Belgium) **Thierry Neuville**	45	13
2025	(Finland) Kalle Rovanperä	44	14
2026	(United Kingdom) **Elfyn Evans**	43	13

== Gallery ==
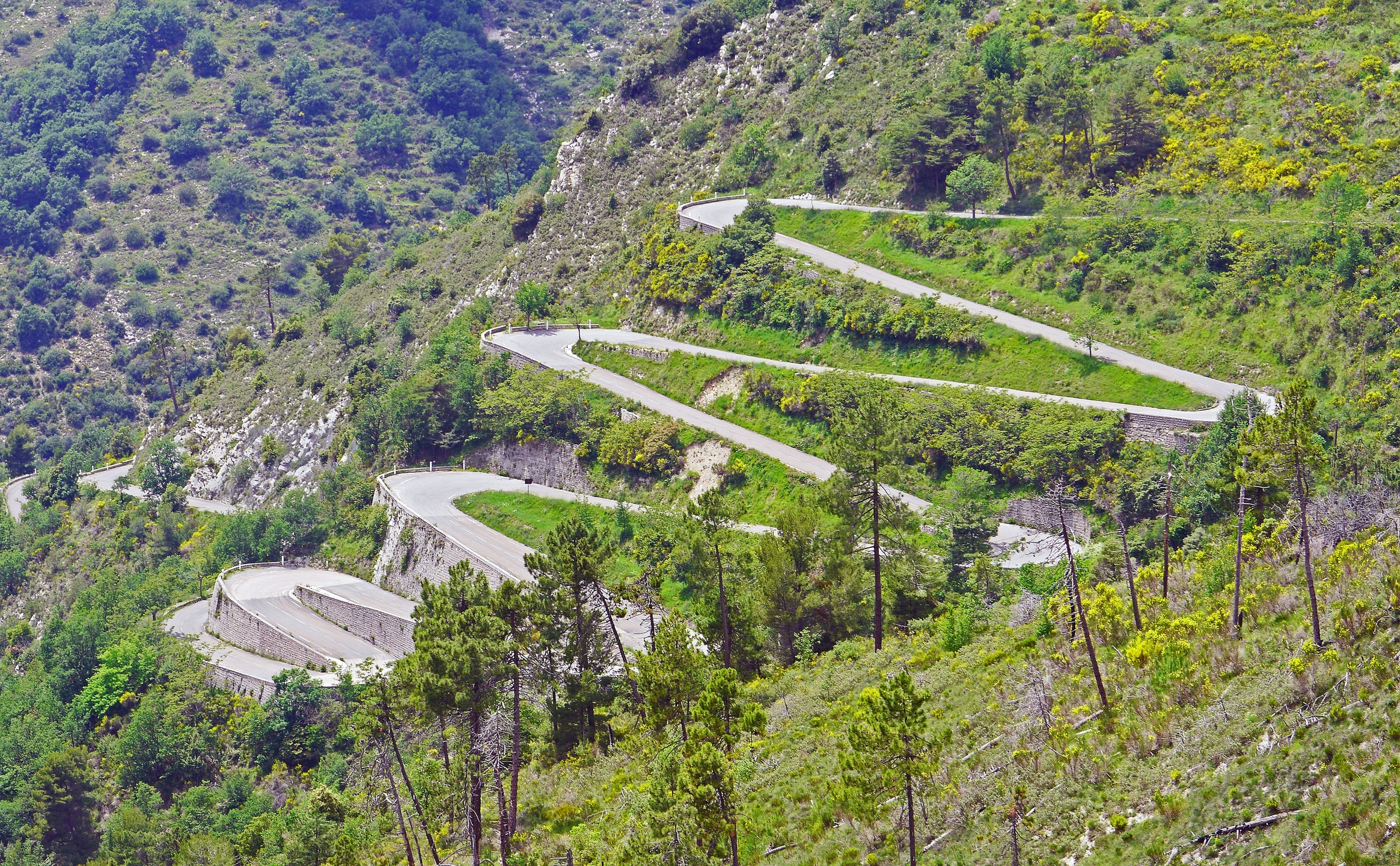
The Col de Braus mountain pass, which was contested as the power stage of Monte Carlo Rally.

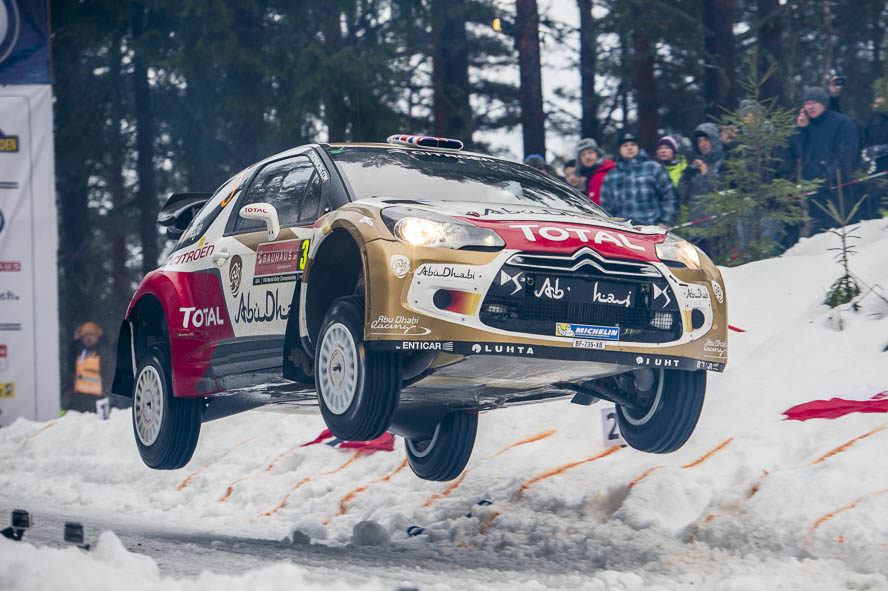
Kris Meeke and Paul Nagle driving a Citroën DS3 WRC at Vargåsen, which was the power stage of 2014 Rally Sweden.

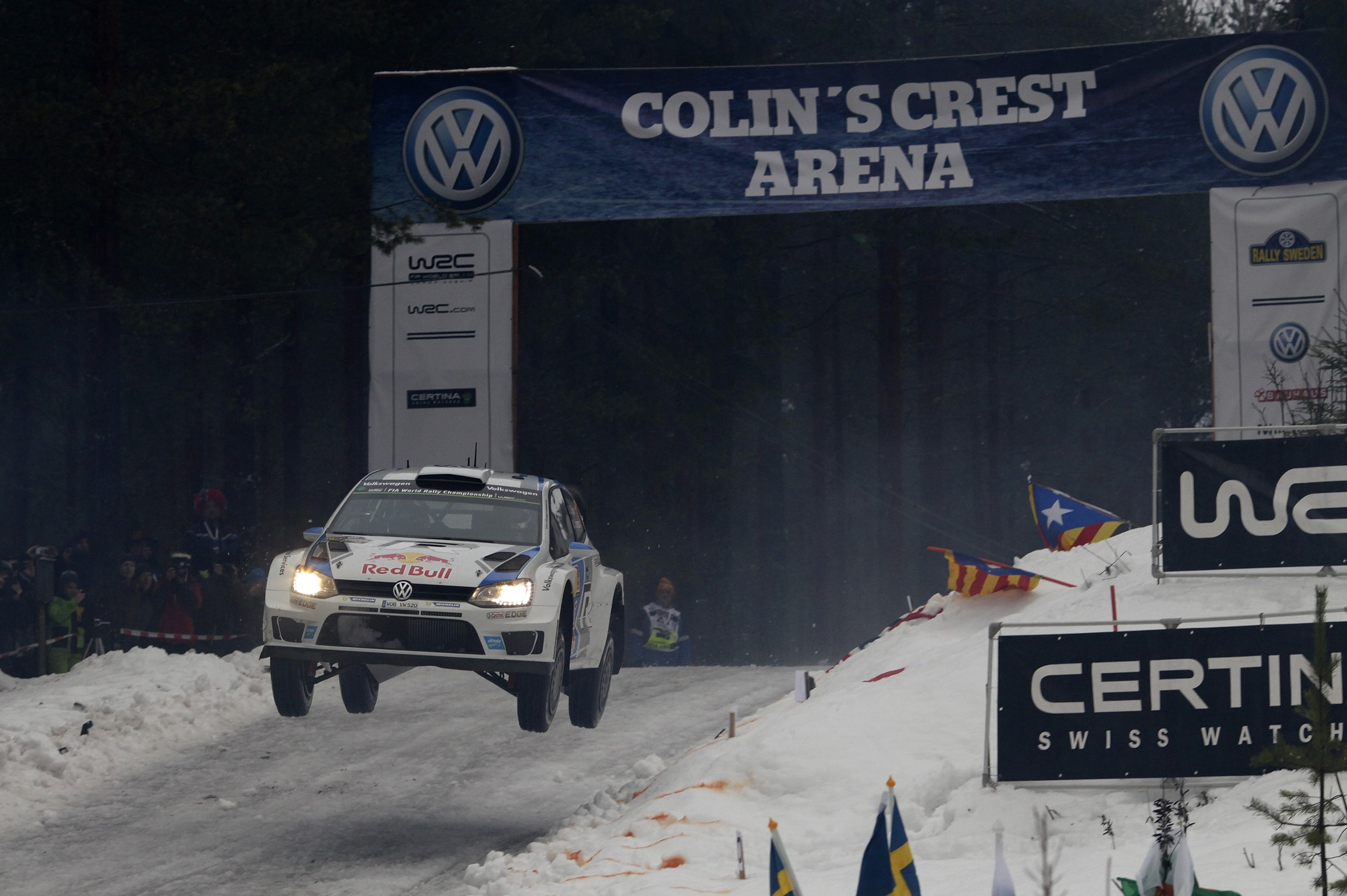
Sébastien Ogier and Julien Ingrassia driving a Volkswagen Polo R WRC at Colin's Crest Arena during 2014 Rally Sweden.

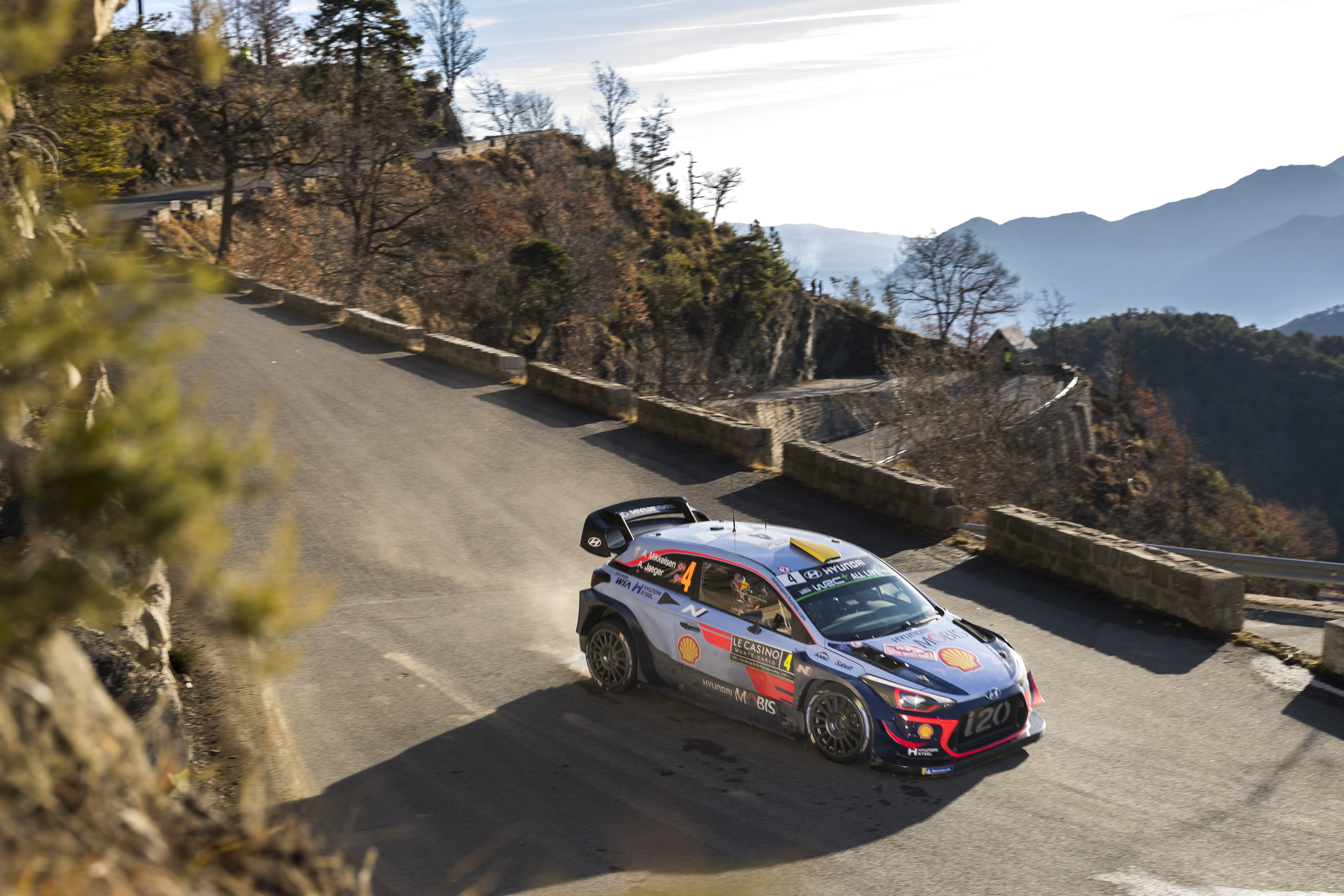
Hyundai's Andreas Mikkelsen and Anders Jæger-Synnevaag on the Col de Braus mountain pass in 2018.

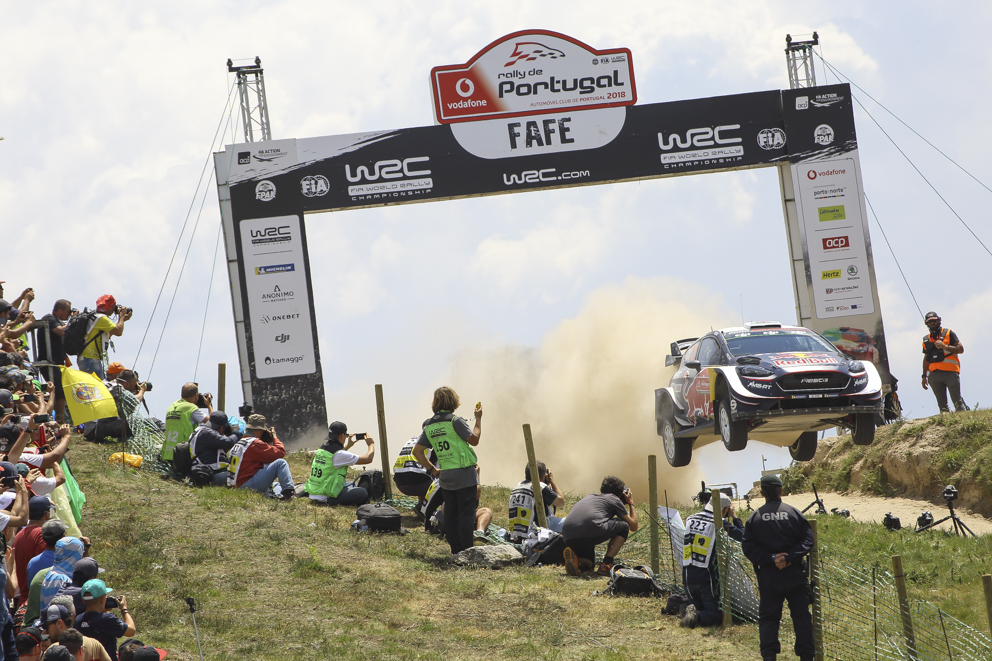
The Ford Fiesta WRC of Elfyn Evans and Daniel Barritt jumping at the Rally de Portugal's iconic Fafe stage.

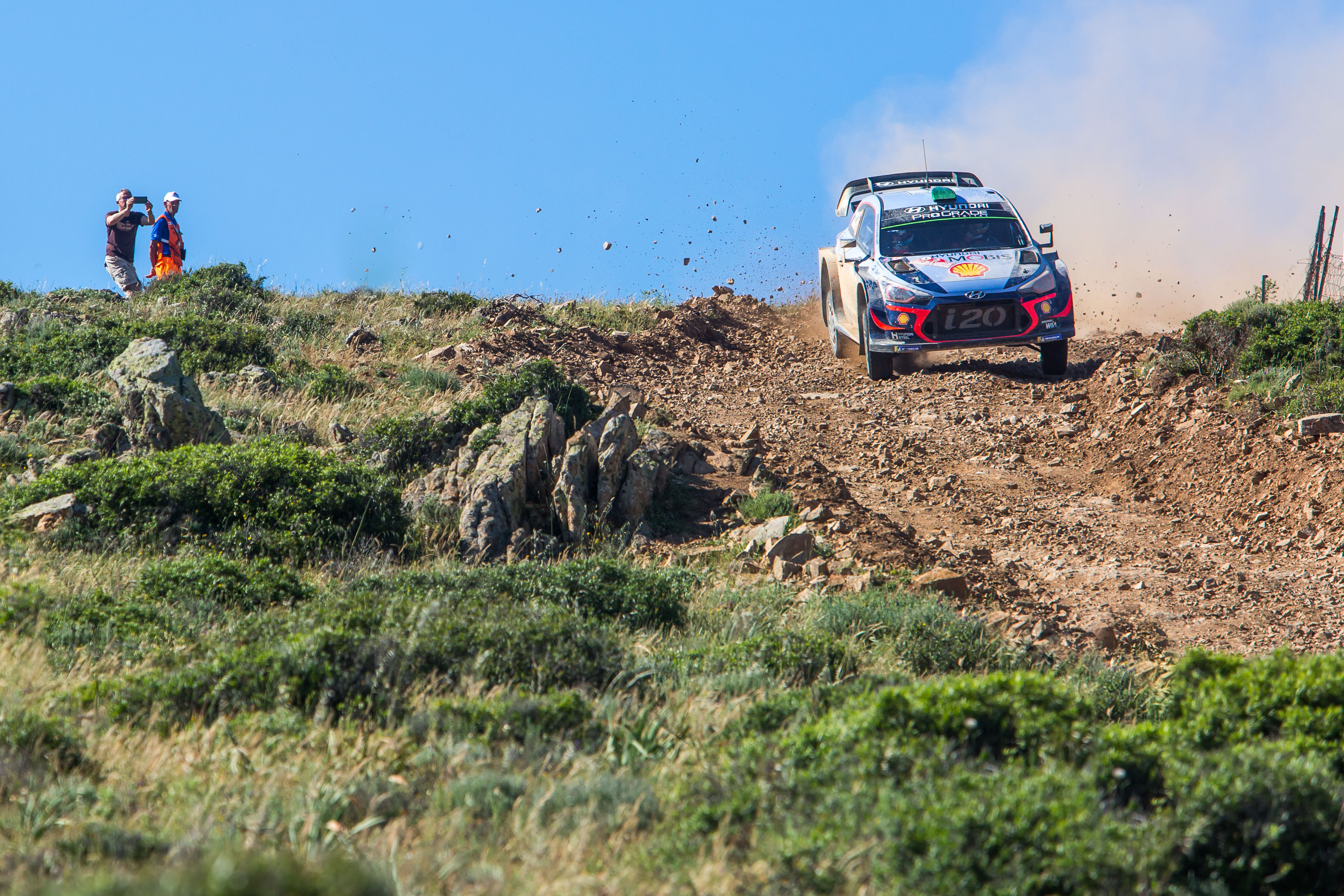
The Hyundai i20 Coupe WRC of Hayden Paddon and Sebastian Marshall during the power stage of 2018 Rally Italia Sardegna.

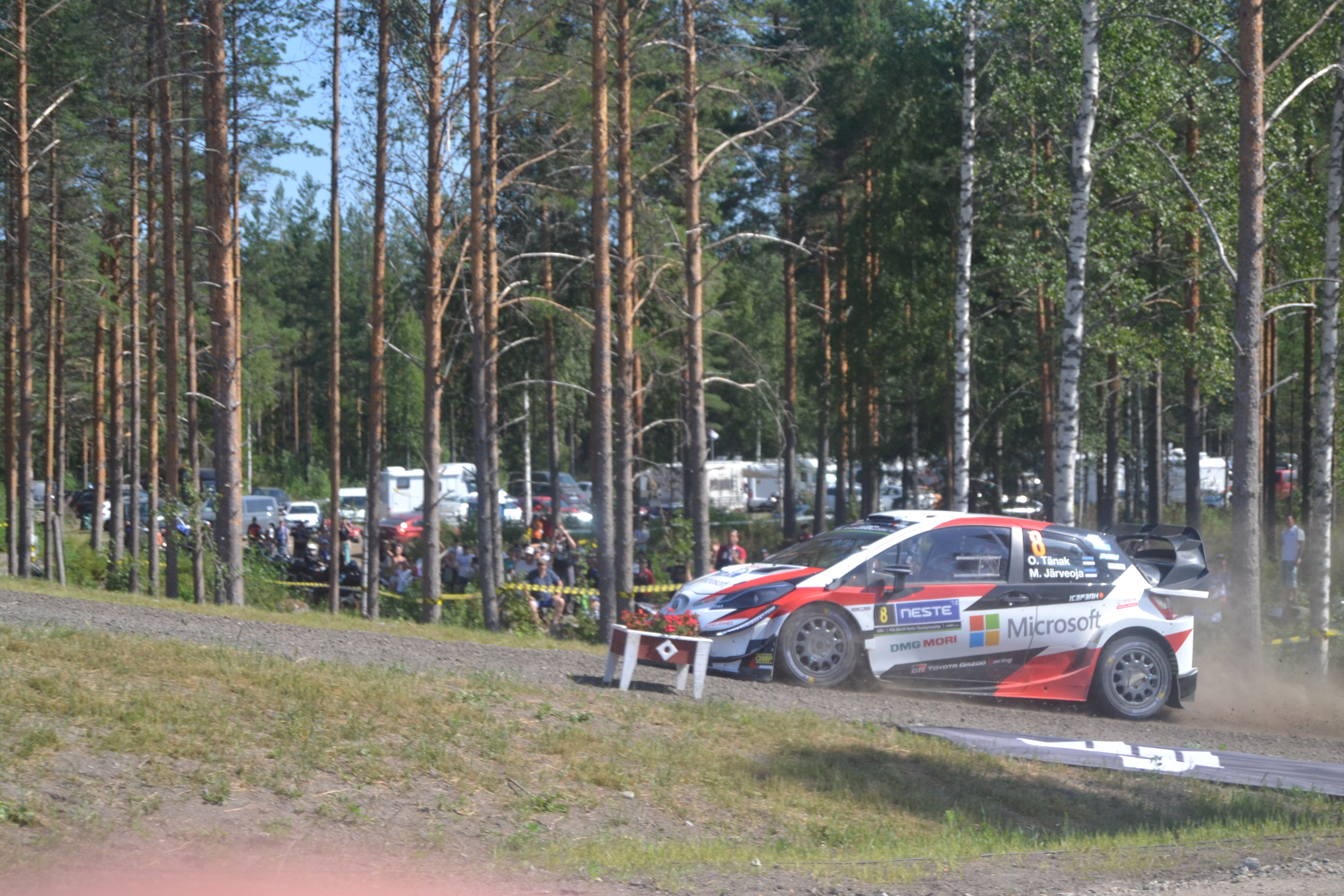
2018 Rally Finland winning crew Ott Tänak and Martin Järveoja driving through the power stage in a Toyota Yaris WRC.
