= 2023 Rally Sweden =

70th edition of Rally Sweden

2023 Rally Sweden Swedish Rally 2023
Round 2 of 13 in the 2023 World Rally Championship
← Previous event	Next event →
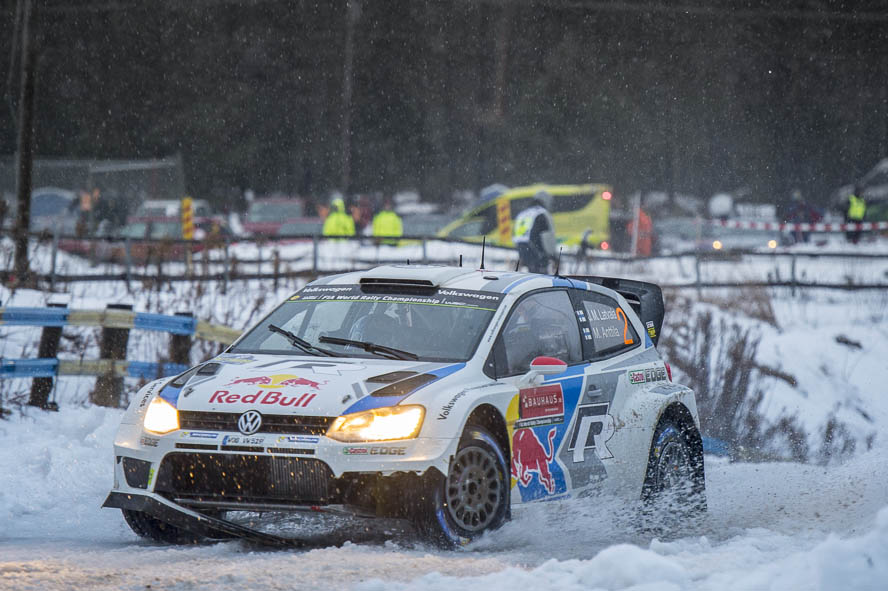
- Rally Sweden is the only snow event on the World Rally Championship calendar.
- Host country: Sweden
- Rally base: Umeå, Västerbotten County
- Dates run: 9 – 12 February 2023
- Start location: Umeå, Västerbotten County
- Finish location: Umeå, Västerbotten County
- Stages: 18 (301.18 km; 187.14 miles)
- Stage surface: Snow
- Transport distance: 892.98 km (554.87 miles)
- Overall distance: 1,194.16 km (742.02 miles)

Statistics
- Crews registered: 52
- Crews: 51 at start, 45 at finish

Overall results
- Overall winner: (Estonia) Ott Tänak (Estonia) Martin Järveoja (United Kingdom) M-Sport Ford WRT; 2:25:54.5
- Power Stage winner: (Finland) Esapekka Lappi (Finland) Janne Ferm (South Korea) Hyundai Shell Mobis WRT; 5:42.0

Support category results
- WRC-2 winner: (Sweden) Oliver Solberg (United Kingdom) Elliott Edmondson; 2:33:42.6
- WRC-3 winner: (Finland) Roope Korhonen (Finland) Anssi Viinikka; 2:44:25.9
- J-WRC winner: (Republic of Ireland) William Creighton (Republic of Ireland) Liam Regan (Republic of Ireland) Motorsport Ireland Rally Academy; 2:45:05.5

The 2023 Rally Sweden (also known as the Swedish Rally 2023) was a motor racing event for rally cars that held over four days between 9 and 12 February 2023. It marked the seventieth running of the Rally Sweden, and was the second round of the 2023 World Rally Championship, World Rally Championship-2 and World Rally Championship-3. The event was also the first round of the 2023 Junior World Rally Championship. The 2023 event was based in Umeå, Västerbotten County and was consisted of eighteen special stages, covering a total competitive distance of 302.52 km (187.98 mi).

Kalle Rovanperä and Jonne Halttunen were the defending rally winners. Their team, Toyota Gazoo Racing WRT, were the defending manufacturers' winners. Andreas Mikkelsen and Torstein Eriksen were the defending rally winners in the WRC-2 category. Lauri Joona and Mikael Korhonen were the defending rally winners in the WRC-3 category. Jon Armstrong and Brian Hoy were defending rally winners of the junior championship.

Ott Tänak and Martin Järveoja won the rally. Their team, M-Sport Ford WRT were the manufacturer's winners. Oliver Solberg and Elliott Edmondson won the World Rally Championship-2 category. Roope Korhonen and Anssi Viinikka won the World Rally Championship-3 category. The Motorsport Ireland Rally Academy crew of William Creighton and Liam Regan won the junior championship by only 0.6 second.

== Background ==
=== Entry list ===
The following crews entered into the rally. The event was open to crews competing in the World Rally Championship, its support categories, the World Rally Championship-2, World Rally Championship-3, Junior World Rally Championship and privateer entries that are not registered to score points in any championship. Nine entered under Rally1 regulations, as were twenty-five Rally2 crews in the World Rally Championship-2 and ten Rally3 crews in the World Rally Championship-3. A total of nine crews participated in the Junior World Rally Championship.

Rally1 entries competing in the World Rally Championship
No.	Driver	Co-Driver	Entrant	Car	Championship eligibility	Tyre
4	(Finland) Esapekka Lappi	(Finland) Janne Ferm	(South Korea) Hyundai Shell Mobis WRT	Hyundai i20 N Rally1	Driver, Co-driver, Manufacturer	P
7	(France) Pierre-Louis Loubet	(Belgium) Nicolas Gilsoul	(United Kingdom) M-Sport Ford WRT	Ford Puma Rally1	Driver, Co-driver, Manufacturer	P
8	(Estonia) Ott Tänak	(Estonia) Martin Järveoja	(United Kingdom) M-Sport Ford WRT	Ford Puma Rally1	Driver, Co-driver, Manufacturer	P
11	(Belgium) Thierry Neuville	(Belgium) Martijn Wydaeghe	(South Korea) Hyundai Shell Mobis WRT	Hyundai i20 N Rally1	Driver, Co-driver, Manufacturer	P
18	(Japan) Takamoto Katsuta	(Republic of Ireland) Aaron Johnston	(Japan) Toyota Gazoo Racing WRT	Toyota GR Yaris Rally1	Driver, Co-driver, Manufacturer	P
33	(United Kingdom) Elfyn Evans	(United Kingdom) Scott Martin	(Japan) Toyota Gazoo Racing WRT	Toyota GR Yaris Rally1	Driver, Co-driver, Manufacturer	P
37	(Italy) Lorenzo Bertelli	(Italy) Simone Scattolin	(Japan) Toyota Gazoo Racing WRT	Toyota GR Yaris Rally1	Driver, Co-driver	P
42	(Republic of Ireland) Craig Breen	(Republic of Ireland) James Fulton	(South Korea) Hyundai Shell Mobis WRT	Hyundai i20 N Rally1	Driver, Co-driver, Manufacturer	P
69	(Finland) Kalle Rovanperä	(Finland) Jonne Halttunen	(Japan) Toyota Gazoo Racing WRT	Toyota GR Yaris Rally1	Driver, Co-driver, Manufacturer	P

Rally2 entries competing in the World Rally Championship-2
No.	Driver	Co-Driver	Entrant	Car	Championship eligibility	Tyre
20	(Sweden) Oliver Solberg	(United Kingdom) Elliott Edmondson	(Sweden) Oliver Solberg	Škoda Fabia RS Rally2	Driver, Co-driver	P
21	(Norway) Ole Christian Veiby	(Norway) Torstein Eriksen	(Norway) Ole Christian Veiby	Volkswagen Polo GTI R5	Driver, Co-driver	P
22	(Finland) Emil Lindholm	(Finland) Reeta Hämäläinen	(Germany) Toksport WRT	Škoda Fabia RS Rally2	Driver, Co-driver, Team	P
23	(Finland) Teemu Suninen	(Finland) Mikko Markkula	(South Korea) Hyundai Motorsport N	Hyundai i20 N Rally2	Driver, Co-driver, Team	P
24	(Finland) Jari Huttunen	(Finland) Antti Linnaketo	(Finland) Jari Huttunen	Škoda Fabia R5	Driver, Co-driver	P
25	(Estonia) Georg Linnamäe	(United Kingdom) James Morgan	(Estonia) Georg Linnamäe	Hyundai i20 N Rally2	Challenger Driver, Challenger Co-driver	P
26	(Estonia) Egon Kaur	(Estonia) Jakko Viilo	(Estonia) Egon Kaur	Škoda Fabia Rally2 evo	Challenger Driver, Challenger Co-driver	P
28	(Finland) Sami Pajari	(Finland) Enni Mälkönen	(Germany) Toksport WRT	Škoda Fabia RS Rally2	Challenger Driver, Challenger Co-driver, Team	P
29	(Estonia) Robert Virves	(Portugal) Hugo Magalhães	(United Kingdom) M-Sport Ford WRT	Ford Fiesta Rally2	Challenger Driver, Challenger Co-driver	P
30	(Finland) Lauri Joona	(Finland) Tuukka Shemeikka	(Finland) Lauri Joona	Škoda Fabia Rally2 evo	Challenger Driver, Challenger Co-driver	P
31	(Bolivia) Marco Bulacia	(Spain) Diego Vallejo	(Germany) Toksport WRT 2	Škoda Fabia RS Rally2	Challenger Driver, Challenger Co-driver, Team	P
32	(Bolivia) Bruno Bulacia	(Spain) Axel Coronado Jiménez	(Bolivia) Marco Bulacia	Škoda Fabia Rally2 evo	Challenger Driver, Challenger Co-driver	P
34	(Paraguay) Fabrizio Zaldivar	(Italy) Marcelo Der Ohannesian	(South Korea) Hyundai Motorsport N	Hyundai i20 N Rally2	Challenger Driver, Challenger Co-driver, Team	P
35	(Saudi Arabia) Rakan Al-Rashed	(Australia) Dale Moscatt	(Saudi Arabia) Rakan Al-Rashed	Škoda Fabia RS Rally2	Challenger Driver, Challenger Co-driver	P
36	(Poland) Michał Sołowow	(Poland) Maciej Baran	(Poland) Michał Sołowow	Škoda Fabia RS Rally2	Masters Driver, Co-driver	P
38	(Italy) Mauro Miele	(Italy) Luca Beltrame	(Italy) Mauro Miele	Škoda Fabia Rally2 evo	Challenger/Masters Driver, Challenger Co-driver	P
39	(Italy) Fabrizio Arengi Bentivoglio	(Italy) Massimiliano Bosi	(Italy) Fabrizio Arengi Bentivoglio	Škoda Fabia Rally2 evo	Challenger/Masters Driver, Challenger/Masters Co-driver	P
40	(Spain) Daniel Alonso Villarón	(Spain) Adrián Pérez Fernández	(Spain) Daniel Alonso Villarón	Citroën C3 Rally2	Masters Driver, Co-driver	P
41	(Sweden) Jörgen Jonasson	(Sweden) Nicklas Jonasson	(Sweden) Jörgen Jonasson	Škoda Fabia Rally2 evo	Driver, Co-driver	P
44	(Italy) Luciano Cobbe	(Italy) Roberto Mometti	(Italy) Luciano Cobbe	Škoda Fabia Rally2 evo	Masters Driver, Masters Co-driver	P
45	(Sweden) Joakim Roman	(Sweden) Ida Lidebjer-Granberg	(Sweden) Joakim Roman	Škoda Fabia R5	Challenger/Masters Driver, Challenger Co-driver	P
46	(Paraguay) Miguel Zaldivar Sr.	(Argentina) José Luis Díaz	(Paraguay) Miguel Zaldivar Sr.	Hyundai i20 N Rally2	Masters Driver, Co-driver	P
47	(Spain) Miguel Díaz-Aboitiz	(Spain) Rodolfo del Barrio	(Spain) Miguel Díaz-Aboitiz	Škoda Fabia Rally2 evo	Challenger/Masters Driver, Challenger Co-driver	P
48	(Spain) Alexander Villanueva	(Spain) José Murado González	(Spain) Alexander Villanueva	Škoda Fabia Rally2 evo	Masters Driver, Co-driver	P

Rally3 entries competing in the World Rally Championship-3 and/or the Junior World Rally Championship
No.	Driver	Co-Driver	Entrant	Car	Class eligibility	Tyre
49	(Finland) Roope Korhonen	(Finland) Anssi Viinikka	(Finland) Roope Korhonen	Ford Fiesta Rally3	WRC-3	P
50	(Republic of Ireland) William Creighton	(Republic of Ireland) Liam Regan	(Republic of Ireland) Motorsport Ireland Rally Academy	Ford Fiesta Rally3	WRC-3, Junior WRC	P
51	(Luxembourg) Grégoire Munster	(Belgium) Louis Louka	(Luxembourg) Grégoire Munster	Ford Fiesta Rally3	Junior WRC	P
52	(France) Laurent Pellier	(France) Marine Pelamourgues	(France) Laurent Pellier	Ford Fiesta Rally3	WRC-3, Junior WRC	P
53	(Finland) Toni Herranen	(Finland) Mikko Lukka	(Finland) Toni Herranen	Ford Fiesta Rally3	WRC-3	P
54	(Paraguay) Diego Dominguez Jr.	(Spain) Rogelio Peñate	(Paraguay) Diego Dominguez Jr.	Ford Fiesta Rally3	WRC-3, Junior WRC	P
55	(Finland) Jesse Kallio	(Finland) Jussi Lindberg	(Finland) Jesse Kallio	Ford Fiesta Rally3	WRC-3	P
56	(Republic of Ireland) Eamonn Kelly	(Republic of Ireland) Conor Mohan	(Republic of Ireland) Motorsport Ireland Rally Academy	Ford Fiesta Rally3	WRC-3, Junior WRC	P
57	(Czech Republic) Filip Kohn	(Czech Republic) Tomáš Střeska	(Czech Republic) Filip Kohn	Ford Fiesta Rally3	WRC-3	P
58	(Spain) Raúl Hernández	(Spain) Rodrigo Sanjuan de Eusebio	(Spain) Raúl Hernández	Ford Fiesta Rally3	Junior WRC	P
59	(Belgium) Tom Rensonnet	(Belgium) Loïc Dumont	(Belgium) Tom Rensonnet	Ford Fiesta Rally3	WRC-3, Junior WRC	P
60	(Spain) Roberto Blach Núñez	(Spain) Mauro Barreiro	(Spain) Roberto Blach Núñez	Ford Fiesta Rally3	Junior WRC	P
61	(Kenya) Hamza Anwar	(Kenya) Adnan Din	(Kenya) Hamza Anwar	Ford Fiesta Rally3	WRC-3, Junior WRC	P

Other major entries
No.	Driver	Co-Driver	Entrant	Car	Championship eligibility	Tyre
27	Nikolay Gryazin (Note: Nikolay Gryazin is Russian, but he competes as a neutral competitor using the ANA flag as Russian national emblems were banned by the association due to the Russian invasion of Ukraine.)	Konstantin Aleksandrov (Note: Konstantin Aleksandrov is Russian, but he competes as a neutral competitor using the ANA flag as Russian national emblems were banned by the association due to the Russian invasion of Ukraine.)	(Germany) Toksport WRT 2	Škoda Fabia RS Rally2	—N/a	P
62	(Spain) José Luis García Molina	(Spain) Daniel Cué	(Spain) José Luis García Molina	Škoda Fabia Rally2 evo	Masters Driver	P

=== Itinerary ===
All dates and times are CET (UTC+1).

Date	No.	Time span	Stage name	Distance
9 February	—N/a	After 9:01	Håkmark [Shakedown]	5.45 km
9 February		After 18:30	Opening ceremony, Umeå	—N/a
9 February	SS1	After 19:05	Umeå Sprint 1	5.16 km
10 February	SS2	After 8:30	Brattby 1	10.76 km
10 February	SS3	After 9:31	Sarsjöliden 1	14.23 km
10 February	SS4	After 11:03	Botsmark 1	25.81 km
10 February		12:58 – 13:43	Regroup, Umeå	—N/a
10 February		13:43 – 14:13	Flexi service A, Umeå	—N/a
10 February	SS5	After 14:53	Brattby 2	10.76 km
10 February	SS6	After 15:54	Sarsjöliden 2	14.23 km
10 February	SS7	After 17:26	Botsmark 2	25.81 km
10 February	SS8	After 19:05	Umeå Sprint 2	5.16 km
10 February		19:45 – 20:45	Flexi service B, Umeå	—N/a
11 February	SS9	After 8:05	Norrby 1	12.54 km
11 February	SS10	After 9:00	Floda 1	28.25 km
11 February	SS11	After 10:37	Sävar 1	17.28 km
11 February		11:50 – 12:35	Regroup, Umeå	—N/a
11 February		12:35 – 13:05	Flexi service C, Umeå	—N/a
11 February	SS12	After 14:05	Norrby 2	12.54 km
11 February	SS13	After 15:00	Floda 2	28.25 km
11 February	SS14	After 16:37	Sävar 2	17.28 km
11 February	SS15	After 18:05	Umeå 1	10.08 km
11 February		18:52 – 19:52	Flexi service D, Umeå	—N/a
12 February	SS16	After 7:05	Västervik 1	26.48 km
12 February		8:10 – 8:50	Regroup, Umeå	—N/a
12 February		8:50 – 9:05	Flexi service E, Umeå	—N/a
12 February	SS17	After 10:05	Västervik 2	26.48 km
12 February		11:10 – 12:00	Regroup, Umeå	—N/a
12 February	SS18	After 12:18	Umeå 2 [Power Stage]	10.08 km
12 February		After 13:30	Podium ceremony, Umeå	—N/a

== Report ==
=== WRC Rally1 ===
==== Classification ====
Position		No.	Driver	Co-driver	Entrant	Car	Time	Difference	Points	
Event	Class	No.	Driver	Co-driver	Entrant	Car	Time	Difference	Event	Stage
1	1	8	Ott Tänak	Martin Järveoja	M-Sport Ford WRT	Ford Puma Rally1	2:25:54.5	0.0	25	2
2	2	42	Craig Breen	James Fulton	Hyundai Shell Mobis WRT	Hyundai i20 N Rally1	2:26:13.2	+18.7	18	1
3	3	11	Thierry Neuville	Martijn Wydaeghe	Hyundai Shell Mobis WRT	Hyundai i20 N Rally1	2:26:14.5	+20.0	15	0
4	4	69	Kalle Rovanperä	Jonne Halttunen	Toyota Gazoo Racing WRT	Toyota GR Yaris Rally1	2:26:19.6	+25.1	12	3
5	5	33	Elfyn Evans	Scott Martin	Toyota Gazoo Racing WRT	Toyota GR Yaris Rally1	2:27:18.5	+1:24.0	10	4
6	6	7	Pierre-Louis Loubet	Nicolas Gilsoul	M-Sport Ford WRT	Ford Puma Rally1	2:31:53.5	+5:59.0	8	0
7	7	4	Esapekka Lappi	Janne Ferm	Hyundai Shell Mobis WRT	Hyundai i20 N Rally1	2:33:36.9	+7:42.4	6	5
14	8	37	Lorenzo Bertelli	Simone Scattolin	Toyota Gazoo Racing WRT	Toyota GR Yaris Rally1	2:36:30.5	+10:36.0	0	0
Retired SS18		18	Takamoto Katsuta	Aaron Johnston	Toyota Gazoo Racing WRT	Toyota GR Yaris Rally1	Mechanical		0	0

==== Special stages ====
Stage	Winners	Car	Time	Class leaders
SD	Rovanperä / Halttunen	Toyota GR Yaris Rally1	2:50.9	—N/a
SS1	Rovanperä / Halttunen	Toyota GR Yaris Rally1	3:23.3	Rovanperä / Halttunen
SS2	Breen / Fulton	Hyundai i20 N Rally1	6:24.8	Tänak / Järveoja
SS3	Rovanperä / Halttunen	Toyota GR Yaris Rally1	6:28.3	Tänak / Järveoja
SS4	Katsuta / Johnston	Toyota GR Yaris Rally1	12:00.0	Tänak / Järveoja
SS5	Breen / Fulton	Hyundai i20 N Rally1	6:25.1	Breen / Fulton
SS6	Breen / Fulton	Hyundai i20 N Rally1	6:35.0	Breen / Fulton
SS7	Tänak / Järveoja	Ford Puma Rally1	12:02.3	Breen / Fulton
SS8	Rovanperä / Halttunen	Toyota GR Yaris Rally1	3:28.1	Breen / Fulton
SS9	Neuville / Wydaeghe	Hyundai i20 N Rally1	5:20.2	Breen / Fulton
SS10	Breen / Fulton	Hyundai i20 N Rally1	12:11.5	Breen / Fulton
SS11	Rovanperä / Halttunen	Toyota GR Yaris Rally1	8:07.2	Breen / Fulton
SS12	Rovanperä / Halttunen	Toyota GR Yaris Rally1	5:23.6	Breen / Fulton
SS13	Neuville / Wydaeghe	Hyundai i20 N Rally1	12:10.0	Breen / Fulton
SS14	Neuville / Wydaeghe	Hyundai i20 N Rally1	8:21.8	Tänak / Järveoja
SS15	Neuville / Wydaeghe	Hyundai i20 N Rally1	5:49.2	Tänak / Järveoja
SS16	Rovanperä / Halttunen	Toyota GR Yaris Rally1	12:41.0	Tänak / Järveoja
SS17	Neuville / Wydaeghe	Hyundai i20 N Rally1	12:37.0	Tänak / Järveoja
SS18	Lappi / Ferm	Hyundai i20 N Rally1	5:42.0	Tänak / Järveoja

==== Championship standings ====
Pos.	Drivers' championships			Co-drivers' championships			Manufacturers' championships		
Pos.	Move	Driver	Points	Move	Co-driver	Points	Move	Manufacturer	Points
1	4	Ott Tänak	41	4	Martin Järveoja	41		Toyota Gazoo Racing WRT	80
2		Kalle Rovanperä	38		Jonne Halttunen	38		Hyundai Shell Mobis WRT	66
3		Thierry Neuville	32		Martijn Wydaeghe	32		M-Sport Ford WRT	51
4		Elfyn Evans	29		Scott Martin	29			
5	4	Sébastien Ogier	26	4	Vincent Landais	26			

=== WRC-2 Rally2 ===
==== Classification ====
Position		No.	Driver	Co-driver	Entrant	Car	Time	Difference	Points		
Event	Class	No.	Driver	Co-driver	Entrant	Car	Time	Difference	Class	Stage	Event
8	1	20	Oliver Solberg	Elliott Edmondson	Oliver Solberg	Škoda Fabia RS Rally2	2:33:42.6	0.0	25	3	4
9	2	21	Ole Christian Veiby	Torstein Eriksen	Ole Christian Veiby	Volkswagen Polo GTI R5	2:34:24.9	+42.3	18	1	2
10	3	28	Sami Pajari	Enni Mälkönen	Toksport WRT	Škoda Fabia RS Rally2	2:34:57.7	+1:15.1	15	0	1
12	4	25	Georg Linnamäe	James Morgan	Georg Linnamäe	Hyundai i20 N Rally2	2:36:03.7	+2:21.1	12	0	0
13	5	31	Marco Bulacia	Diego Vallejo	Toksport WRT 2	Škoda Fabia RS Rally2	2:36:24.1	+2:41.5	10	0	0
15	6	23	Teemu Suninen	Mikko Markkula	Hyundai Motorsport N	Hyundai i20 N Rally2	2:36:30.6	+2:48.0	8	0	0
16	7	22	Emil Lindholm	Reeta Hämäläinen	Toksport WRT	Škoda Fabia RS Rally2	2:36:44.1	+3:01.5	6	2	0
17	8	30	Lauri Joona	Tuukka Shemeikka	Lauri Joona	Škoda Fabia Rally2 evo	2:36:53.2	+3:10.6	4	0	0
18	9	29	Robert Virves	Hugo Magalhães	M-Sport Ford WRT	Ford Fiesta Rally2	2:38:15.6	+4:33.0	2	0	0
19	10	32	Bruno Bulacia	Axel Coronado	Bruno Bulacia	Škoda Fabia Rally2 evo	2:38:17.9	+4:35.3	1	0	0
20	11	26	Egon Kaur	Jakko Viilo	Egon Kaur	Škoda Fabia Rally2 evo	2:40:17.8	+6:35.2	0	0	0
21	12	36	Michał Sołowow	Maciej Baran	Michał Sołowow	Škoda Fabia Rally2 evo	2:42:21.3	+8:38.7	0	0	0
27	13	46	Miguel Zaldivar Sr.	José Luis Díaz	Miguel Zaldivar Sr.	Hyundai i20 N Rally2	2:51:52.3	+18:09.7	0	0	0
29	14	48	Alexander Villanueva	José Murado González	Alexander Villanueva	Škoda Fabia Rally2 evo	2:53:11.4	+19:28.8	0	0	0
31	15	34	Fabrizio Zaldivar	Marcelo Der Ohannesian	Hyundai Motorsport N	Hyundai i20 N Rally2	2:57:57.2	+24:14.6	0	0	0
34	16	35	Rakan Al-Rashed	Dale Moscatt	Rakan Al-Rashed	Škoda Fabia RS Rally2	3:00:16.4	+26:33.8	0	0	0
37	17	47	Miguel Díaz-Aboitiz	Rodolfo del Barrio	Miguel Díaz-Aboitiz	Škoda Fabia Rally2 evo	3:11:06.4	+37:23.8	0	0	0
38	18	44	Luciano Cobbe	Roberto Mometti	Luciano Cobbe	Škoda Fabia Rally2 evo	3:11:35.6	+37:53.0	0	0	0
39	19	45	Joakim Roman	Ida Lidebjer-Granberg	Joakim Roman	Škoda Fabia R5	3:14:54.5	+41:11.9	0	0	0
Retired SS17		24	Jari Huttunen	Antti Linnaketo	Jari Huttunen	Škoda Fabia R5	Withdrawn		0	0	0
Retired SS17		40	Daniel Alonso Villarón	Adrián Pérez Fernández	Daniel Alonso Villarón	Citroën C3 Rally2	Withdrawn		0	0	0
Retired SS13		38	Mauro Miele	Luca Beltrame	Mauro Miele	Škoda Fabia Rally2 evo	Withdrawn		0	0	0
Retired SS11		41	Jörgen Jonasson	Nicklas Jonasson	Jörgen Jonasson	Škoda Fabia Rally2 evo	Withdrawn		0	0	0

==== Special stages ====
Overall
Stage	Winners	Car	Time	Class leaders
SD	Solberg / Edmondson	Škoda Fabia RS Rally2	3:01.4	—N/a
SS1	Huttunen / Linnaketo	Škoda Fabia R5	3:34.7	Huttunen / Linnaketo
SS2	Lindholm / Hämäläinen	Škoda Fabia RS Rally2	6:46.1	Lindholm / Hämäläinen
SS3	Solberg / Edmondson	Škoda Fabia RS Rally2	6:51.1	Solberg / Edmondson
SS4	Pajari / Mälkönen	Škoda Fabia RS Rally2	12:41.6	Solberg / Edmondson
SS5	Solberg / Edmondson	Škoda Fabia RS Rally2	6:45.0	Solberg / Edmondson
SS6	Pajari / Mälkönen	Škoda Fabia RS Rally2	6:58.1	Solberg / Edmondson
SS7	Pajari / Mälkönen	Škoda Fabia RS Rally2	12:42.7	Solberg / Edmondson
SS8	Solberg / Edmondson	Škoda Fabia RS Rally2	3:35.0	Solberg / Edmondson
SS9	Solberg / Edmondson	Škoda Fabia RS Rally2	5:40.9	Solberg / Edmondson
SS10	Veiby / Eriksen	Volkswagen Polo GTI R5	12:54.3	Solberg / Edmondson
SS11	Veiby / Eriksen	Volkswagen Polo GTI R5	8:35.2	Solberg / Edmondson
SS12	Lindholm / Hämäläinen	Škoda Fabia RS Rally2	5:41.6	Solberg / Edmondson
SS13	Solberg / Edmondson	Škoda Fabia RS Rally2	12:49.0	Solberg / Edmondson
SS14	Solberg / Edmondson	Škoda Fabia RS Rally2	8:44.5	Solberg / Edmondson
SS15	Solberg / Edmondson	Škoda Fabia RS Rally2	6:05.1	Solberg / Edmondson
SS16	Veiby / Eriksen	Volkswagen Polo GTI R5	13:29.0	Solberg / Edmondson
SS17	Pajari / Mälkönen	Škoda Fabia RS Rally2	13:19.1	Solberg / Edmondson
SS18	Solberg / Edmondson	Škoda Fabia RS Rally2	5:57.7	Solberg / Edmondson

Challenger
Stage	Winners	Car	Time	Class leaders
SD	Linnamäe / Morgan	Hyundai i20 N Rally2	3:02.9	—N/a
SS1	Pajari / Mälkönen	Škoda Fabia RS Rally2	3:35.9	Pajari / Mälkönen
SS2	Pajari / Mälkönen	Škoda Fabia RS Rally2	6:47.2	Pajari / Mälkönen
SS3	M. Bulacia / Vallejo	Škoda Fabia RS Rally2	6:59.0	Pajari / Mälkönen
SS4	Pajari / Mälkönen	Škoda Fabia RS Rally2	12:41.6	Pajari / Mälkönen
SS5	Virves / Magalhães	Ford Fiesta Rally2	6:47.2	Pajari / Mälkönen
SS6	Pajari / Mälkönen	Škoda Fabia RS Rally2	6:58.1	Pajari / Mälkönen
SS7	Pajari / Mälkönen	Škoda Fabia RS Rally2	12:42.7	Pajari / Mälkönen
SS8	Kaur / Viilo	Škoda Fabia Rally2 evo	3:36.8	Pajari / Mälkönen
SS9	Pajari / Mälkönen	Škoda Fabia RS Rally2	5:45.0	Pajari / Mälkönen
SS10	Kaur / Viilo	Škoda Fabia Rally2 evo	12:57.1	Pajari / Mälkönen
SS11	Pajari / Mälkönen	Škoda Fabia RS Rally2	8:41.6	Pajari / Mälkönen
SS12	Pajari / Mälkönen	Škoda Fabia RS Rally2	5:42.5	Pajari / Mälkönen
SS13	Pajari / Mälkönen	Škoda Fabia RS Rally2	12:59.8	Pajari / Mälkönen
SS14	Pajari / Mälkönen	Škoda Fabia RS Rally2	8:45.6	Pajari / Mälkönen
SS15	Pajari / Mälkönen	Škoda Fabia RS Rally2	6:10.2	Pajari / Mälkönen
SS16	M. Bulacia / Vallejo	Škoda Fabia RS Rally2	13:35.9	Pajari / Mälkönen
SS17	Pajari / Mälkönen	Škoda Fabia RS Rally2	13:19.1	Pajari / Mälkönen
SS18	Linnamäe / Morgan	Hyundai i20 N Rally2	6:03.7	Pajari / Mälkönen

==== Championship standings ====
Pos.	Open Drivers' championships			Open Co-drivers' championships			Teams' championships			Challenger Drivers' championships			Challenger Co-drivers' championships		
Pos.	Move	Driver	Points	Move	Co-driver	Points	Move	Manufacturer	Points	Move	Manufacturer	Points	Move	Driver	Points
1		Yohan Rossel	28		Arnaud Dunand	28		Toksport WRT 2	40		Nikolay Gryazin	25		Konstantin Aleksandrov	25
2	New entry	Oliver Solberg	28	New entry	Elliott Edmondson	28	New entry	Toksport WRT	40	New entry	Sami Pajari	25	New entry	Enni Mälkönen	25
3	1	Nikolay Gryazin	20	1	Konstantin Aleksandrov	20	1	M-Sport Ford WRT	30	2	Marco Bulacia	25	1	Borja Rozada	18
4	New entry	Ole Christian Veiby	19	New entry	Torstein Eriksen	19	New entry	Hyundai Motorsport N	30	2	Pepe López	18	New entry	James Morgan	18
5	2	Marco Bulacia	16	2	Borja Rozada	15	2	Motorsport Ireland Rally Academy	18	New entry	Georg Linnamäe	18		Axel Coronado	18

=== WRC-3 Rally3 ===
==== Classification ====
Position		No.	Driver	Co-driver	Entrant	Car	Time	Difference	Points
Event	Class	No.	Driver	Co-driver	Entrant	Car	Time	Difference	Points
22	1	49	Roope Korhonen	Anssi Viinikka	Roope Korhonen	Ford Fiesta Rally3	2:44:25.9	0.0	25
23	2	50	William Creighton	Liam Regan	Motorsport Ireland Rally Academy	Ford Fiesta Rally3	2:45:05.5	+39.6	18
24	3	52	Laurent Pellier	Marine Pelamourgues	Laurent Pellier	Ford Fiesta Rally3	2:45:06.1	+40.2	15
25	4	54	Diego Dominguez Jr.	Rogelio Peñate	Diego Dominguez Jr.	Ford Fiesta Rally3	2:47:33.9	+3:08.0	12
33	5	59	Tom Rensonnet	Loïc Dumont	Tom Rensonnet	Ford Fiesta Rally3	2:59:51.5	+15:25.6	10
35	6	55	Jesse Kallio	Jussi Lindberg	Jesse Kallio	Ford Fiesta Rally3	3:00:21.6	+15:55.7	8
36	7	61	Hamza Anwar	Adnan Din	Hamza Anwar	Ford Fiesta Rally3	3:04:12.5	+19:46.6	6
40	8	53	Toni Herranen	Mikko Lukka	Toni Herranen	Ford Fiesta Rally3	3:15:02.2	+30:36.1	4
44	9	57	Filip Kohn	Tomáš Střeska	Filip Kohn	Ford Fiesta Rally3	3:48:42.0	+1:04:16.1	2
Retired SS16		56	Eamonn Kelly	Conor Mohan	Motorsport Ireland Rally Academy	Ford Fiesta Rally3	Withdrawn		0

==== Special stages ====
Stage	Winners	Car	Time	Class leaders
SD	Korhonen / Viinikka	Ford Fiesta Rally3	3:17.6	—N/a
SS1	Creighton / Regan	Ford Fiesta Rally3	3:45.5	Creighton / Regan
SS2	Creighton / Regan	Ford Fiesta Rally3	7:16.5	Creighton / Regan
SS3	Korhonen / Viinikka	Ford Fiesta Rally3	7:20.9	Creighton / Regan
SS4	Korhonen / Viinikka	Ford Fiesta Rally3	13:19.2	Korhonen / Viinikka
SS5	Pellier / Pelamourgues	Ford Fiesta Rally3	7:16.6	Korhonen / Viinikka
SS6	Korhonen / Viinikka	Ford Fiesta Rally3	7:20.3	Korhonen / Viinikka
SS7	Pellier / Pelamourgues	Ford Fiesta Rally3	13:40.2	Korhonen / Viinikka
SS8	Creighton / Regan	Ford Fiesta Rally3	3:46.4	Creighton / Regan
SS9	Korhonen / Viinikka	Ford Fiesta Rally3	6:05.3	Korhonen / Viinikka
SS10	Herranen / Lukka	Ford Fiesta Rally3	13:46.0	Creighton / Regan
SS11	Korhonen / Viinikka	Ford Fiesta Rally3	9:11.8	Creighton / Regan
SS12	Korhonen / Viinikka	Ford Fiesta Rally3	6:01.7	Korhonen / Viinikka
SS13	Herranen / Lukka	Ford Fiesta Rally3	13:51.5	Korhonen / Viinikka
SS14	Pellier / Pelamourgues	Ford Fiesta Rally3	9:22.6	Korhonen / Viinikka
SS15	Korhonen / Viinikka	Ford Fiesta Rally3	6:28.2	Korhonen / Viinikka
SS16	Creighton / Regan	Ford Fiesta Rally3	14:13.3	Korhonen / Viinikka
SS17	Creighton / Regan	Ford Fiesta Rally3	14:03.4	Korhonen / Viinikka
SS18	Korhonen / Viinikka	Ford Fiesta Rally3	6:18.3	Korhonen / Viinikka

==== Championship standings ====
Pos.	Drivers' championships			Co-drivers' championships		
Pos.	Move	Driver	Points	Move	Co-driver	Points
1	New entry	Roope Korhonen	25	New entry	Anssi Viinikka	25
2	New entry	William Creighton	18	New entry	Liam Regan	18
3	New entry	Laurent Pellier	15	New entry	Marine Pelamourgues	15
4	New entry	Diego Dominguez Jr.	12	New entry	Rogelio Peñate	12
5	New entry	Tom Rensonnet	10	New entry	Loïc Dumont	10

=== J-WRC Rally3 ===
==== Classification ====
Position		No.	Driver	Co-driver	Entrant	Car	Time	Difference	Points	
Event	Class	No.	Driver	Co-driver	Entrant	Car	Time	Difference	Class	Stage
23	1	50	William Creighton	Liam Regan	Motorsport Ireland Rally Academy	Ford Fiesta Rally3	2:45:05.5	0.0	25	9
24	2	52	Laurent Pellier	Marine Pelamourgues	Laurent Pellier	Ford Fiesta Rally3	2:45:06.1	+0.6	18	6
25	3	54	Diego Dominguez Jr.	Rogelio Peñate	Diego Dominguez Jr.	Ford Fiesta Rally3	2:47:33.9	+2:28.4	15	0
26	4	51	Grégoire Munster	Louis Louka	Grégoire Munster	Ford Fiesta Rally3	2:48:08.1	+3:02.6	12	3
28	5	58	Raúl Hernández	Rodrigo Sanjuan de Eusebio	Raúl Hernández	Ford Fiesta Rally3	2:52:50.4	+7:44.9	10	0
30	6	60	Roberto Blach Núñez	Mauro Barreiro	Roberto Blach Núñez	Ford Fiesta Rally3	2:55:41.4	+10:35.9	8	0
33	7	59	Tom Rensonnet	Loïc Dumont	Tom Rensonnet	Ford Fiesta Rally3	2:59:51.5	+14:46.0	6	0
36	8	61	Hamza Anwar	Adnan Din	Hamza Anwar	Ford Fiesta Rally3	3:04:12.5	+19:07.0	4	0
Retired SS16		56	Eamonn Kelly	Conor Mohan	Motorsport Ireland Rally Academy	Ford Fiesta Rally3	Withdrawn		0	0

==== Special stages ====
Stage	Winners	Car	Time	Class leaders
SD	Munster / Louka	Ford Fiesta Rally3	3:21.7	—N/a
SS1	Creighton / Regan	Ford Fiesta Rally3	3:45.5	Creighton / Regan
SS2	Creighton / Regan	Ford Fiesta Rally3	7:16.5	Creighton / Regan
SS3	Creighton / Regan	Ford Fiesta Rally3	7:24.0	Creighton / Regan
SS4	Creighton / Regan	Ford Fiesta Rally3	13:25.6	Creighton / Regan
SS5	Pellier / Pelamourgues	Ford Fiesta Rally3	7:16.6	Creighton / Regan
SS6	Creighton / Regan	Ford Fiesta Rally3	7:24.3	Creighton / Regan
SS7	Pellier / Pelamourgues	Ford Fiesta Rally3	13:40.2	Creighton / Regan
SS8	Creighton / Regan	Ford Fiesta Rally3	3:46.4	Creighton / Regan
SS9	Munster / Louka	Ford Fiesta Rally3	6:09.0	Creighton / Regan
SS10	Munster / Louka	Ford Fiesta Rally3	13:44.4	Creighton / Regan
SS11	Creighton / Regan	Ford Fiesta Rally3	9:13.4	Creighton / Regan
SS12	Pellier / Pelamourgues	Ford Fiesta Rally3	6:04.2	Creighton / Regan
SS13	Munster / Louka	Ford Fiesta Rally3	13:57.6	Pellier / Pelamourgues
SS14	Pellier / Pelamourgues	Ford Fiesta Rally3	9:22.6	Pellier / Pelamourgues
SS15	Pellier / Pelamourgues	Ford Fiesta Rally3	6:29.6	Pellier / Pelamourgues
SS16	Creighton / Regan	Ford Fiesta Rally3	14:13.3	Pellier / Pelamourgues
SS17	Creighton / Regan	Ford Fiesta Rally3	14:03.4	Creighton / Regan
SS18	Pellier / Pelamourgues	Ford Fiesta Rally3	6:19.5	Creighton / Regan

==== Championship standings ====
Pos.	Drivers' championships			Co-drivers' championships		
Pos.	Move	Driver	Points	Move	Co-driver	Points
1	New entry	William Creighton	34	New entry	Liam Regan	34
2	New entry	Laurent Pellier	24	New entry	Marine Pelamourgues	24
3	New entry	Diego Dominguez Jr.	15	New entry	Rogelio Peñate	15
4	New entry	Grégoire Munster	15	New entry	Louis Louka	15
5	New entry	Raúl Hernández	10	New entry	Raúl Hernández	10

== Notes ==
Previous rally: 2023 Monte Carlo Rally	2023 FIA World Rally Championship	Next rally: 2023 Rally Mexico
Previous rally: 2022 Rally Sweden	2023 Rally Sweden	Next rally: 2024 Rally Sweden
