= Col de Braus =

Mountain pass in France

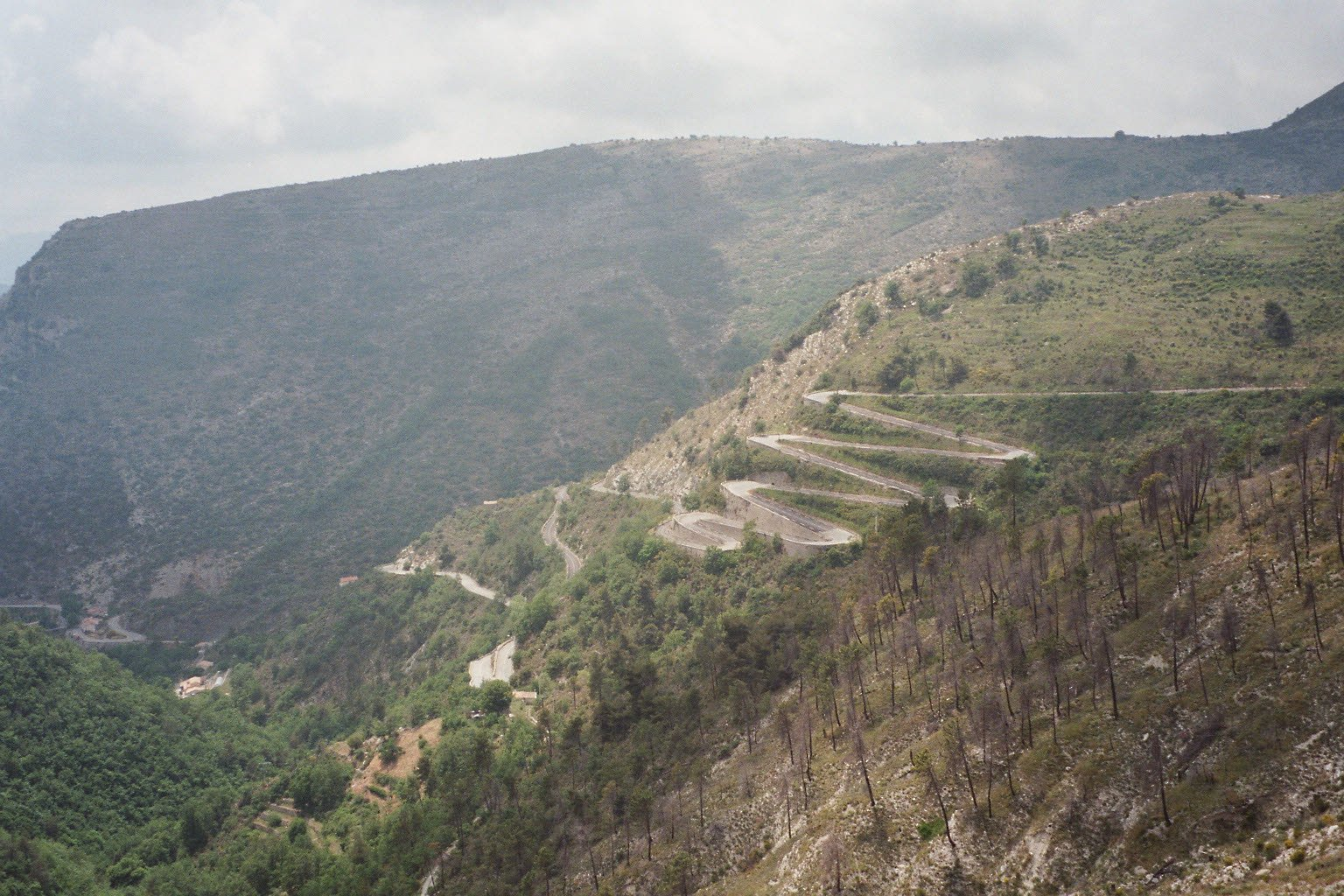
- Hairpin bends on the pass road
- Interactive map of Col de Braus
- Elevation: 1,002 metres (3,287 ft)

Third Approach
- Location: Alpes-Maritimes, France
- Range: Alps
- Coordinates: 43°52′18″N 7°23′48″E

Col de Braus (1002 m) is a high mountain pass in the Alps in the department of Alpes-Maritimes in France.

It connects Sospel and L'Escarène. A railway tunnel has been dug under the pass.

== See also ==
- List of highest paved roads in Europe
- List of mountain passes
