= 2026 Croatia Rally =

50th edition of the Croatia Rally

2026 Croatia Rally Croatia Rally 2026
Round 4 of 13 in the 2026 World Rally Championship
← Previous event	Next event →
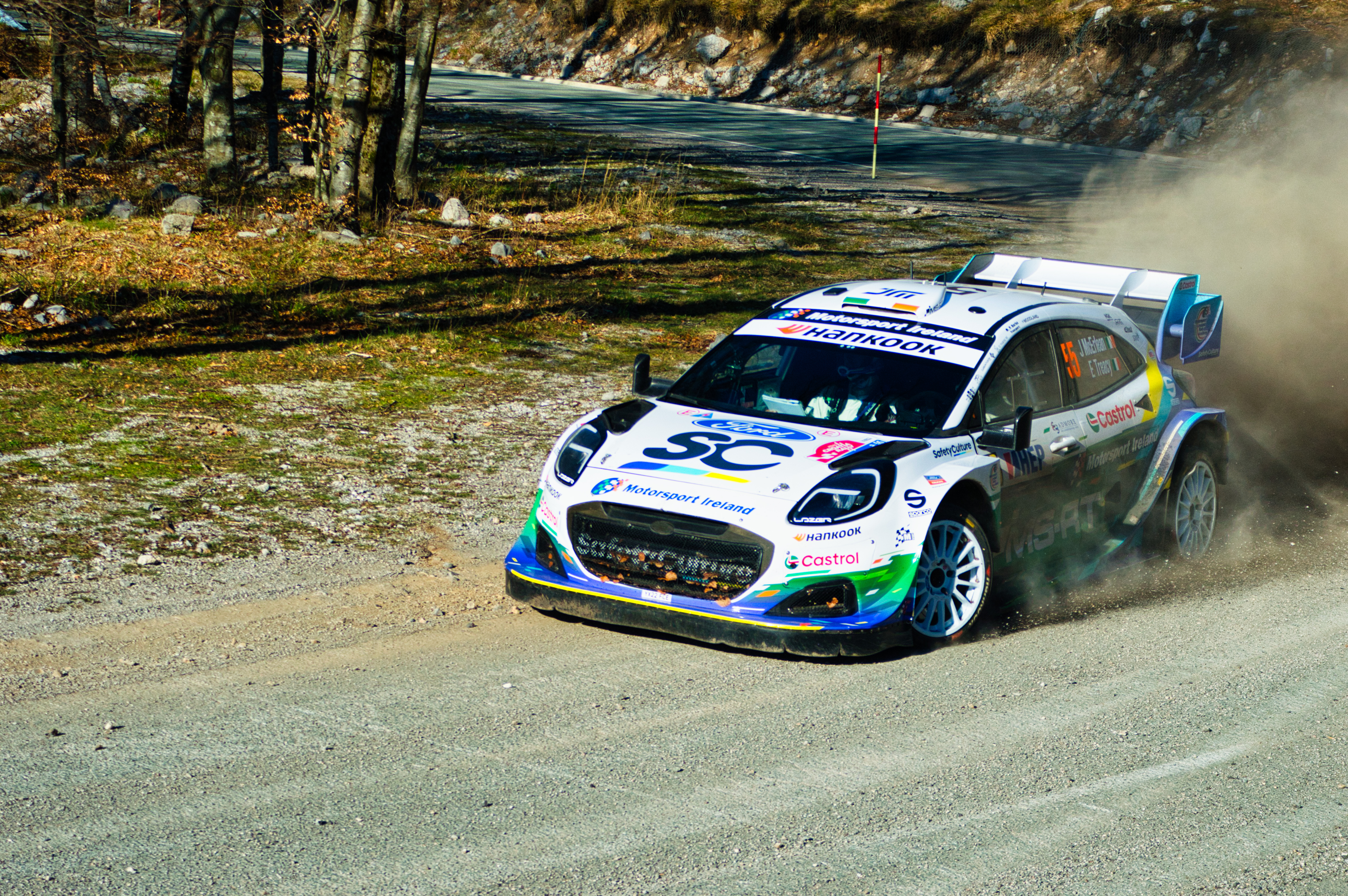
- The rally would return to the championship after missing 2025.
- Host country: Croatia
- Rally base: Rijeka, Primorje-Gorski Kotar County
- Dates run: 9 – 12 April 2026
- Start location: Rijeka, Primorje-Gorski Kotar County
- Finish location: Opatija, Primorje-Gorski Kotar County
- Stages: 20 (300.28 km; 186.59 miles)
- Stage surface: Tarmac
- Transport distance: 536.04 km (333.08 miles)
- Overall distance: 836.32 km (519.67 miles)

Statistics
- Crews registered: 51
- Crews: 51 at start, 44 at finish

Overall results
- Overall winner: (Japan) Takamoto Katsuta (Republic of Ireland) Aaron Johnston (Japan) Toyota Gazoo Racing WRT; 2:51:15.8
- Sunday Accumulated leader: (Sweden) Oliver Solberg (United Kingdom) Elliott Edmondson (Japan) Toyota Gazoo Racing WRT; 28:33.6
- Power Stage winner: (Sweden) Oliver Solberg (United Kingdom) Elliott Edmondson (Japan) Toyota Gazoo Racing WRT; 7:03.3

Support category results
- WRC-2 winner: (France) Yohan Rossel (France) Arnaud Dunand (Italy) Lancia Corse HF; 2:56:35.7
- WRC-3 winner: (Turkey) Ali Türkkan (Turkey) Oytun Albayrak (Turkey) Castrol Ford Team Türkiye; 3:07:01.1
- J-WRC winner: (Turkey) Ali Türkkan (Turkey) Oytun Albayrak (Turkey) Castrol Ford Team Türkiye; 3:07:01.1

The 2026 Croatia Rally was a motor racing event for rally cars held over four days from 9 to 12 April 2026. It marked the fiftieth running of the Croatia Rally, and was the fourth round of the 2026 World Rally Championship, 2026 WRC2 Championship and 2026 WRC3 Championship. The event was also the second round of the 2026 Junior WRC Championship. The 2026 event was based in Rijeka in Primorje-Gorski Kotar County, and consisted of twenty special stages, covering a total competitive distance of 300.28 km (186.59 mi).

Sébastien Ogier and Vincent Landais were the defending rally winners, and Toyota Gazoo Racing WRT, were the defending manufacturer's winners. Nikolay Gryazin and Konstantin Aleksandrov were the defending rally winners in the WRC2 championship. Romet Jürgenson and Siim Oja were the defending rally winners in the WRC3 championship and the junior category.

Takamoto Katsuta and Aaron Johnston won their second rally of the season, and their team, Toyota, successfully defended their titles. Yohan Rossel and Arnaud Dunand were the winners in the WRC2 category. Ali Türkkan and Oytun Albayrak were the winners in the WRC3 category as well as the junior championship.

== Background ==
=== Entry list ===
The following crews entered into the rally. The event opened to crews competing in the World Rally Championship, its support categories, the WRC2 Championship, the WRC3 Championship and privateer entries that were not registered to score points in any championship. Nine crews were set to enter under Rally1 regulations, as were twenty Rally2 crews in the WRC2 Championship and seven Rally3 crews in the WRC3 Championship. A total of seven crews participated in the Junior World Rally Championship.

Rally1 entries competing in the World Rally Championship
No.	Driver	Co-Driver	Entrant	Car	Championship eligibility	Tyre
5	(Finland) Sami Pajari	(Finland) Marko Salminen	(Japan) Toyota Gazoo Racing WRT2	Toyota GR Yaris Rally1	Driver, Co-driver, Manufacturer, Team	H
11	(Belgium) Thierry Neuville	(Belgium) Martijn Wydaeghe	(South Korea) Hyundai Shell Mobis WRT	Hyundai i20 N Rally1	Driver, Co-driver, Manufacturer	H
16	(France) Adrien Fourmaux	(France) Alexandre Coria	(South Korea) Hyundai Shell Mobis WRT	Hyundai i20 N Rally1	Driver, Co-driver, Manufacturer	H
18	(Japan) Takamoto Katsuta	(Republic of Ireland) Aaron Johnston	(Japan) Toyota Gazoo Racing WRT	Toyota GR Yaris Rally1	Driver, Co-driver, Manufacturer	H
20	(New Zealand) Hayden Paddon	(New Zealand) John Kennard	(South Korea) Hyundai Shell Mobis WRT	Hyundai i20 N Rally1	Driver, Co-driver, Manufacturer	H
33	(United Kingdom) Elfyn Evans	(United Kingdom) Scott Martin	(Japan) Toyota Gazoo Racing WRT	Toyota GR Yaris Rally1	Driver, Co-driver, Manufacturer	H
55	(Republic of Ireland) Josh McErlean	(Republic of Ireland) Eoin Treacy	(United Kingdom) M-Sport Ford WRT	Ford Puma Rally1	Driver, Co-driver, Manufacturer	H
95	(Republic of Ireland) Jon Armstrong	(Republic of Ireland) Shane Byrne	(United Kingdom) M-Sport Ford WRT	Ford Puma Rally1	Driver, Co-driver, Manufacturer	H
99	(Sweden) Oliver Solberg	(United Kingdom) Elliott Edmondson	(Japan) Toyota Gazoo Racing WRT	Toyota GR Yaris Rally1	Driver, Co-driver, Manufacturer	H

Rally2 entries competing in the WRC2 Championship
No.	Driver	Co-Driver	Entrant	Car	Championship eligibility	Tyre
21	(France) Léo Rossel	(France) Guillaume Mercoiret	(France) 2C Junior Team	Citroën C3 Rally2	Challenger Driver, Challenger Co-driver	H
22	(Finland) Roope Korhonen	(Finland) Anssi Viinikka	(Finland) Rautio Motorsport	Toyota GR Yaris Rally2	Challenger Driver, Challenger Co-driver	H
23	(Italy) Roberto Daprà	(Italy) Luca Guglielmetti	(Italy) Roberto Daprà	Škoda Fabia RS Rally2	Challenger Driver, Challenger Co-driver	H
24	(France) Arthur Pelamourges	(France) Bastien Pouget	(France) Arthur Pelamourges	Hyundai i20 N Rally2	Challenger Driver, Challenger Co-driver	H
25	(France) Eric Camilli	(France) Thibault de la Haye	(France) Eric Camilli	Škoda Fabia RS Rally2	Driver, Co-driver	H
26	(Norway) Andreas Mikkelsen	(Norway) Jørn Listerud	(Germany) Toksport WRT	Škoda Fabia RS Rally2	Driver, Co-driver, Team	H
27	(Australia) Taylor Gill	(Australia) Daniel Brkic	(Australia) Taylor Gill	Toyota GR Yaris Rally2	Challenger Driver, Challenger Co-driver	H
28	(Bulgaria) Nikolay Gryazin	(Kyrgyzstan) Konstantin Aleksandrov	(Italy) Lancia Corse HF	Lancia Ypsilon Rally2 HF Integrale	Challenger Driver, Challenger Co-driver, Team	H
29	(France) Yohan Rossel	(France) Arnaud Dunand	(Italy) Lancia Corse HF	Lancia Ypsilon Rally2 HF Integrale	Driver, Co-driver, Team	H
30	(Spain) Alejandro Cachón	(Spain) Borja Rozada	(Spain) Toyota España	Toyota GR Yaris Rally2	Challenger Driver, Challenger Co-driver	H
31	(Finland) Emil Lindholm	(Brazil) Gabriel Morales	(Germany) Toksport WRT	Škoda Fabia RS Rally2	Driver, Co-driver, Team	H
32	(Estonia) Romet Jürgenson	(Estonia) Siim Oja	(United Kingdom) M-Sport Ford WRT	Ford Fiesta Rally2	Challenger Driver, Challenger Co-driver, Team	H
34	(Sweden) Mille Johansson	(Sweden) Johan Grönvall	(United Kingdom) M-Sport Ford WRT	Ford Fiesta Rally2	Challenger Driver, Challenger Co-driver, Team	H
36	(Poland) Kajetan Kajetanowicz	(Poland) Maciej Szczepaniak	(Poland) Kajetan Kajetanowicz	Toyota GR Yaris Rally2	Challenger Driver, Challenger Co-driver	H
37	(France) Pablo Sarrazin	(France) Geoffrey Combe	(France) Pablo Sarrazin	Citroën C3 Rally2	Challenger Driver, Challenger Co-driver	H
38	(Netherlands) Bernhard ten Brinke	(United Kingdom) Tom Woodburn	(Netherlands) Bernhard ten Brinke	Toyota GR Yaris Rally2	Challenger Driver, Challenger Co-driver	H
39	(Croatia) Viliam Prodan	(Croatia) Marko Stiperski	(Croatia) Viliam Prodan	Toyota GR Yaris Rally2	Challenger Driver, Challenger Co-driver	H
40	(Turkey) Uğur Soylu	(Turkey) Onur Vatansever	(Turkey) GP Garage My Team	Škoda Fabia RS Rally2	Challenger/Masters Driver, Challenger Co-driver	H
41	(Austria) Johannes Keferböck	(Austria) Ilka Minor	(Austria) Johannes Keferböck	Toyota GR Yaris Rally2	Challenger/Masters Driver, Masters Co-driver	H
42	(Netherlands) Henk Vossen	(Netherlands) Radboud van Hoek	(Netherlands) Henk Vossen	Hyundai i20 N Rally2	Challenger/Masters Driver, Challenger/Masters Co-driver	H

Rally3 entries competing in the WRC3 Championship and/or the Junior World Rally Championship
No.	Driver	Co-Driver	Entrant	Car	Class eligibility	Tyre
43	(Italy) Matteo Fontana	(Italy) Alessandro Arnaboldi	(Italy) Matteo Fontana	Ford Fiesta Rally3	WRC3	H
44	(France) Ghjuvanni Rossi	(France) Kylian Sarmezan	(France) Ghjuvanni Rossi	Ford Fiesta Rally3	WRC3	H
45	(Germany) Nicolas Otto Boehringer	(Portugal) Hugo Magalhães	(Germany) Nicolas Otto Boehringer	Ford Fiesta Rally3	WRC3	H
46	(Sweden) Calle Carlberg	(Norway) Jørgen Eriksen	(Sweden) Calle Carlberg	Ford Fiesta Rally3	Junior WRC	H
47	(Finland) Leevi Lassila	(Finland) Mikko Lukka	(Finland) Leevi Lassila	Ford Fiesta Rally3	Junior WRC	H
48	(Spain) Raúl Hernández	(Spain) José Murado	(Spain) Raúl Hernández	Ford Fiesta Rally3	WRC3, Junior WRC	H
49	(Turkey) Ali Türkkan	(Turkey) Oytun Albayrak	(Turkey) Castrol Ford Team Türkiye	Ford Fiesta Rally3	WRC3, Junior WRC	H
50	(Spain) Gil Membrado	(Spain) Adrián Pérez	(Spain) Gil Membrado	Ford Fiesta Rally3	WRC3, Junior WRC	H
51	(Turkey) Kerem Kazaz	(France) Corentin Silvestre	(Turkey) Team Petrol Ofisi	Ford Fiesta Rally3	WRC3, Junior WRC	H
52	(Republic of Ireland) Craig Rahill	(Republic of Ireland) Conor Smith	(Republic of Ireland) Motorsport Ireland Rally Academy	Ford Fiesta Rally3	Junior WRC	H

Other major entries
No.	Driver	Co-Driver	Entrant	Car	Tyre
35	(Japan) Yuki Yamamoto	(Republic of Ireland) James Fulton	(Finland) Printsport	Toyota GR Yaris Rally2	H

=== Itinerary ===
All dates and times are CEST (UTC+2).

Date	No.	Time span	Stage name	Distance
9 April	—	After 10:01	[Shakedown]	3.65 km
9 April		After 18:30	Opening ceremony, Rijeka Korzo	—N/a
10 April	SS1	After 9:03	Vodice – Brest 1	14.12 km
10 April	SS2	After 10:11	Lake Butoniga – Motovun 1	13.78 km
10 April	SS3	After 11:14	Beram – Cerovlje 1	23.78 km
10 April	SS4	After 12:02	Učka 1	11.75 km
10 April		13:02 – 13:32	Regroup, Automotodrom Grobnik	—N/a
10 April		13:32 – 14:02	Service A, Automotodrom Grobnik	—N/a
10 April	SS5	After 15:15	Vodice – Brest 2	14.12 km
10 April	SS6	After 16:13	Lake Butoniga – Motovun 2	13.78 km
10 April	SS7	After 17:16	Beram – Cerovlje 2	23.78 km
10 April	SS8	After 18:04	Učka 2	11.75 km
10 April		19:14 – 19:59	Flexi service B, Automotodrom Grobnik	—N/a
11 April		7:52 – 8:07	Service C, Automotodrom Grobnik	—N/a
11 April	SS9	After 8:43	Platak 1	16.26 km
11 April	SS10	After 9:41	Ravna Gora – Skrad 1	10.13 km
11 April	SS11	After 11:05	Generalski Stol – Zdihovo 1	22.48 km
11 April	SS12	After 12:03	Pećurkovo Brdo – Mrežnički Novaki 1	9.11 km
11 April		12:48 – 13:26	Regroup, Karlovac	—N/a
11 April		13:26 – 13:41	Tyre fitting zone, Karlovac	—N/a
11 April	SS13	After 14:12	Pećurkovo Brdo – Mrežnički Novaki 2	9.11 km
11 April	SS14	After 15:05	Generalski Stol – Zdihovo 2	22.48 km
11 April	SS15	After 16:23	Ravna Gora – Skrad 2	10.13 km
11 April	SS16	After 17:22	Platak 2	16.26 km
11 April		18:12 – 18:57	Flexi service D, Automotodrom Grobnik	—N/a
12 April		6:52 – 7:07	Service E, Automotodrom Grobnik	—N/a
12 April	SS17	After 8:05	Bribir – Novi Vinodolski 1	14.17 km
12 April	SS18	After 9:05	Alan – Senj 1	14.56 km
12 April	SS19	After 10:38	Bribir – Novi Vinodolski 2	14.17 km
12 April		11:08 – 12:28	Regroup, Novi Vinodolski	—N/a
12 April	SS20	After 13:15	Alan – Senj 2 [Power Stage]	14.56 km
12 April		After 15:30	Finish, Opatija	—N/a
12 April		After 16:00	Podium ceremony, Opatija	—N/a

== Report ==
=== WRC Rally1 ===
==== Classification ====
Position		No.	Driver	Co-driver	Entrant	Car	Time	Difference	Points			
Event	Class	No.	Driver	Co-driver	Entrant	Car	Time	Difference	Event	Sunday	Stage	Total
1	1	18	Takamoto Katsuta	Aaron Johnston	Toyota Gazoo Racing WRT	Toyota GR Yaris Rally1	2:51:15.8	0.0	25	0	1	26
2	2	5	Sami Pajari	Marko Salminen	Toyota Gazoo Racing WRT2	Toyota GR Yaris Rally1	2:51:36.5	+20.7	17	1	2	20
3	3	20	Hayden Paddon	John Kennard	Hyundai Shell Mobis WRT	Hyundai i20 N Rally1	2:53:23.5	+2:07.7	15	0	0	15
15	4	55	Josh McErlean	Eoin Treacy	M-Sport Ford WRT	Ford Puma Rally1	3:03:38.9	+12:23.1	0	0	0	0
30	5	16	Adrien Fourmaux	Alexandre Coria	Hyundai Shell Mobis WRT	Hyundai i20 N Rally1	3:40:37.3	+49:21.5	0	2	0	2
32	6	95	Jon Armstrong	Shane Byrne	M-Sport Ford WRT	Ford Puma Rally1	3:40:46.9	+49:31.1	0	3	3	6
34	7	33	Elfyn Evans	Scott Martin	Toyota Gazoo Racing WRT	Toyota GR Yaris Rally1	3:47:30.6	+56:14.8	0	4	4	8
42	8	99	Oliver Solberg	Elliott Edmondson	Toyota Gazoo Racing WRT	Toyota GR Yaris Rally1	4:10:18.0	+1:19:02.2	0	5	5	10
Retired SS20		11	Thierry Neuville	Martijn Wydaeghe	Hyundai Shell Mobis WRT	Hyundai i20 N Rally1	Accident damage		0	0	0	0

==== Special stages ====
Stage	Winners	Car	Time	Class leaders
SD	Solberg / Edmondson	Toyota GR Yaris Rally1	2:17.7	—N/a
SS1	Evans / Martin	Toyota GR Yaris Rally1	7:59.7	Evans / Martin
SS2	Evans / Martin	Toyota GR Yaris Rally1	7:33.9	Evans / Martin
SS3	Neuville / Wydaeghe	Hyundai i20 N Rally1	13:20.5	Pajari / Salminen
SS4	Pajari / Salminen	Toyota GR Yaris Rally1	6:55.3	Pajari / Salminen
SS5	Pajari / Salminen	Toyota GR Yaris Rally1	8:14.6	Pajari / Salminen
SS6	Neuville / Wydaeghe	Hyundai i20 N Rally1	7:39.0	Pajari / Salminen
SS7	Neuville / Wydaeghe	Hyundai i20 N Rally1	13:19.8	Pajari / Salminen
SS8	Pajari / Salminen	Toyota GR Yaris Rally1	6:50.2	Pajari / Salminen
SS9	Solberg / Edmondson	Toyota GR Yaris Rally1	8:36.8	Pajari / Salminen
SS10	Solberg / Edmondson	Toyota GR Yaris Rally1	5:43.0	Pajari / Salminen
SS11	Solberg / Edmondson	Toyota GR Yaris Rally1	13:44.9	Pajari / Salminen
SS12	Solberg / Edmondson	Toyota GR Yaris Rally1	4:49.0	Pajari / Salminen
SS13	Katsuta / Johnston	Toyota GR Yaris Rally1	4:47.0	Pajari / Salminen
SS14	Solberg / Edmondson	Toyota GR Yaris Rally1	13:59.5	Neuville / Wydaeghe
SS15	Solberg / Edmondson	Toyota GR Yaris Rally1	5:46.9	Neuville / Wydaeghe
SS16	Evans / Martin	Toyota GR Yaris Rally1	8:49.5	Neuville / Wydaeghe
SS17	Solberg / Edmondson	Toyota GR Yaris Rally1	7:10.7	Neuville / Wydaeghe
SS18	Solberg / Edmondson	Toyota GR Yaris Rally1	7:03.2	Neuville / Wydaeghe
SS19	Solberg / Edmondson	Toyota GR Yaris Rally1	7:16.4	Neuville / Wydaeghe
SS20	Solberg / Edmondson	Toyota GR Yaris Rally1	7:03.3	Katsuta / Johnston

==== Championship standings ====
Drivers' Standings
Move	Pos.	Driver	Points
2	1	Takamoto Katsuta	81
1	2	Elfyn Evans	74
1	3	Oliver Solberg	68
1	4	Sami Pajari	52
1	5	Adrien Fourmaux	49

Co-drivers' Standings
Move	Pos.	Driver	Points
2	1	Aaron Johnston	81
1	2	Scott Martin	74
1	3	Elliott Edmondson	68
1	4	Marko Salminen	52
1	5	Alexandre Coria	49

Manufacturers' Standings
Move	Pos.	Driver	Points
	1	Toyota Gazoo Racing WRT	206
	2	Hyundai Shell Mobis WRT	141
	3	Toyota Gazoo Racing WRT2	55
	4	M-Sport Ford WRT	49

=== WRC2 Rally2 ===
==== Classification ====
Position		No.	Driver	Co-driver	Entrant	Car	Time	Difference	Points	
Event	Class	No.	Driver	Co-driver	Entrant	Car	Time	Difference	Class	Event
4	1	29	Yohan Rossel	Arnaud Dunand	Lancia Corsa HF	Lancia Ypsilon Rally2 HF Integrale	2:56:35.7	0.0	25	12
5	2	21	Léo Rossel	Guillaume Mercoiret	2C Junior Team	Citroën C3 Rally2	2:57:14.5	+38.8	17	10
6	3	28	Nikolay Gryazin	Konstantin Aleksandrov	Lancia Corsa HF	Lancia Ypsilon Rally2 HF Integrale	2:57:33.6	+57.9	15	8
7	4	30	Alejandro Cachón	Borja Rozada	Toyota España	Toyota GR Yaris Rally2	2:57:58.6	+1:22.9	12	6
8	5	22	Roope Korhonen	Anssi Viinikka	Rautio Motorsport	Toyota GR Yaris Rally2	2:58:09.18	+1:34.1	10	4
9	6	23	Roberto Daprà	Luca Guglielmetti	Roberto Daprà	Škoda Fabia RS Rally2	2:58:53.9	+2:18.2	8	2
10	7	31	Emil Lindholm	Gabriel Morales	Toksport WRT	Škoda Fabia RS Rally2	3:00:36.3	+4:00.6	6	1
11	8	36	Kajetan Kajetanowicz	Maciej Szczepaniak	Kajetan Kajetanowicz	Toyota GR Yaris Rally2	3:01:24.7	+4:49.0	4	0
12	9	27	Taylor Gill	Daniel Brkic	Taylor Gill	Toyota GR Yaris Rally2	3:01:30.2	+4:54.5	2	0
13	10	32	Romet Jürgenson	Siim Oja	M-Sport Ford WRT	Ford Fiesta Rally2	3:01:37.1	+5:01.4	1	0
14	11	26	Andreas Mikkelsen	Jørn Listerud	Toksport WRT	Škoda Fabia RS Rally2	3:03:33.9	+6:58.2	0	0
18	12	39	Viliam Prodan	Marko Stiperski	Viliam Prodan	Škoda Fabia RS Rally2	3:09:55.4	+13:19.7	0	0
23	13	41	Johannes Keferböck	Ilka Minor	Johannes Keferböck	Toyota GR Yaris Rally2	3:15:47.4	+19:11.7	0	0
24	14	40	Uğur Soylu	Onur Vatansever	GP Garage My Team	Škoda Fabia RS Rally2	3:23:01.5	+26:25.8	0	0
37	15	38	Bernhard ten Brinke	Tom Woodburn	Bernhard ten Brinke	Toyota GR Yaris Rally2	3:55:20.1	+58:44.4	0	0
40	16	42	Henk Vossen	Radboud van Hoek	Henk Vossen	Hyundai i20 N Rally2	3:58:56.6	+1:02:20.9	0	0
41	17	34	Mille Johansson	Johan Grönvall	M-Sport Ford WRT	Ford Fiesta Rally2	4:06:47.9	+1:10:12.2	0	0
Retired SS20		37	Pablo Sarrazin	Geoffrey Combe	Pablo Sarrazin	Citroën C3 Rally2	Retired		0	0
Retired SS15		25	Eric Camilli	Thibault de la Haye	Eric Camilli	Škoda Fabia RS Rally2	Off road		0	0
Retired SS14		24	Arthur Pelamourges	Bastien Pouget	Arthur Pelamourges	Hyundai i20 N Rally2	Off road		0	0

==== Special stages ====
Overall
Stage	Winners	Car	Time	Class leaders
SD	Camilli / de la Haye	Škoda Fabia RS Rally2	2:24.1	—N/a
SS1	Gryazin / Aleksandrov	Lancia Ypsilon Rally2 HF Integrale	8:34.7	Gryazin / Aleksandrov
SS2	Jürgenson / Oja	Ford Fiesta Rally2	7:58.1	Gryazin / Aleksandrov
SS3	Y. Rossel / Dunand	Lancia Ypsilon Rally2 HF Integrale	13:49.6	Y. Rossel / Dunand
SS4	Y. Rossel / Dunand	Lancia Ypsilon Rally2 HF Integrale	7:12.8	Y. Rossel / Dunand
SS5	Gryazin / Aleksandrov	Lancia Ypsilon Rally2 HF Integrale	8:38.1	Y. Rossel / Dunand
SS6	Jürgenson / Oja	Ford Fiesta Rally2	7:50.2	Y. Rossel / Dunand
SS7	Y. Rossel / Dunand	Lancia Ypsilon Rally2 HF Integrale	13:41.8	Y. Rossel / Dunand
SS8	Y. Rossel / Dunand	Lancia Ypsilon Rally2 HF Integrale	7:08.7	Y. Rossel / Dunand
SS9	Y. Rossel / Dunand	Lancia Ypsilon Rally2 HF Integrale	9:15.3	Y. Rossel / Dunand
SS10	Y. Rossel / Dunand	Lancia Ypsilon Rally2 HF Integrale	6:05.3	Y. Rossel / Dunand
SS11	Gill / Brkic	Toyota GR Yaris Rally2	14:38.3	Y. Rossel / Dunand
SS12	Mikkelsen / Listerud	Škoda Fabia RS Rally2	5:03.5	Y. Rossel / Dunand
SS13	Korhonen / Viinikka	Toyota GR Yaris Rally2	4:59.9	Y. Rossel / Dunand
SS14	Lindholm / Morales	Škoda Fabia RS Rally2	14:44.8	Y. Rossel / Dunand
SS15	Gryazin / Aleksandrov	Lancia Ypsilon Rally2 HF Integrale	6:01.8	Y. Rossel / Dunand
SS16	Cachón / Rozada	Toyota GR Yaris Rally2	9:11.7	Y. Rossel / Dunand
SS17	Gryazin / Aleksandrov	Lancia Ypsilon Rally2 HF Integrale	7:42.7	Y. Rossel / Dunand
SS18	Gryazin / Aleksandrov	Lancia Ypsilon Rally2 HF Integrale	7:29.5	Y. Rossel / Dunand
SS19	Gryazin / Aleksandrov	Lancia Ypsilon Rally2 HF Integrale	7:43.5	Y. Rossel / Dunand
SS20	Gryazin / Aleksandrov	Lancia Ypsilon Rally2 HF Integrale	7:31.3	Y. Rossel / Dunand

Challenger
Stage	Winners	Car	Time	Class leaders
SD	Daprà / Guglielmetti	Škoda Fabia RS Rally2	2:24.6	—N/a
SS1	Gryazin / Aleksandrov	Lancia Ypsilon Rally2 HF Integrale	8:34.7	Gryazin / Aleksandrov
SS2	Jürgenson / Oja	Ford Fiesta Rally2	7:58.1	Gryazin / Aleksandrov
SS3	Jürgenson / Oja	Ford Fiesta Rally2	13:53.6	Jürgenson / Oja
SS4	L. Rossel / Mercoiret	Citroën C3 Rally2	7:13.4	Gryazin / Aleksandrov
SS5	Gryazin / Aleksandrov	Lancia Ypsilon Rally2 HF Integrale	8:38.1	Gryazin / Aleksandrov
SS6	Jürgenson / Oja	Ford Fiesta Rally2	7:50.2	Gryazin / Aleksandrov
SS7	Gryazin / Aleksandrov	Lancia Ypsilon Rally2 HF Integrale	13:49.7	Gryazin / Aleksandrov
SS8	Daprà / Guglielmetti	Škoda Fabia RS Rally2	7:11.9	Gryazin / Aleksandrov
SS9	L. Rossel / Mercoiret	Citroën C3 Rally2	9:17.1	Gryazin / Aleksandrov
SS10	Gill / Brkic	Toyota GR Yaris Rally2	6:06.2	Gryazin / Aleksandrov
SS11	Gill / Brkic	Toyota GR Yaris Rally2	14:38.3	Gryazin / Aleksandrov
SS12	Korhonen / Viinikka	Toyota GR Yaris Rally2	5:05.6	Gryazin / Aleksandrov
SS13	Korhonen / Viinikka	Toyota GR Yaris Rally2	4:59.9	Gryazin / Aleksandrov
SS14	L. Rossel / Mercoiret	Citroën C3 Rally2	14:46.4	L. Rossel / Mercoiret
SS15	Gryazin / Aleksandrov	Lancia Ypsilon Rally2 HF Integrale	6:01.8	L. Rossel / Mercoiret
SS16	Cachón / Rozada	Toyota GR Yaris Rally2	9:11.7	L. Rossel / Mercoiret
SS17	Gryazin / Aleksandrov	Lancia Ypsilon Rally2 HF Integrale	7:42.7	L. Rossel / Mercoiret
SS18	Gryazin / Aleksandrov	Lancia Ypsilon Rally2 HF Integrale	7:29.5	L. Rossel / Mercoiret
SS19	Gryazin / Aleksandrov	Lancia Ypsilon Rally2 HF Integrale	7:43.5	L. Rossel / Mercoiret
SS20	Gryazin / Aleksandrov	Lancia Ypsilon Rally2 HF Integrale	7:31.3	L. Rossel / Mercoiret

==== Championship standings ====
Drivers' Standings
Move	Pos.	Driver	Points
	1	Léo Rossel	42
	2	Roope Korhonen	35
22	3	Yohan Rossel	27
1	4	Robert Virves	25
1	5	Roberto Daprà	25

Co-drivers' Standings
Move	Pos.	Driver	Points
	1	Guillaume Mercoiret	42
	2	Anssi Viinikka	35
22	3	Arnaud Dunand	27
1	4	Jakko Viilo	25
1	5	Luca Guglielmetti	25

Manufacturers' Standings
Move	Pos.	Driver	Points
	1	Lancia Corse HF	84
	2	Toksport WRT	67
	3	M-Sport Ford WRT	45

Challenger Drivers' Standings
Move	Pos.	Driver	Points
	1	Léo Rossel	50
	2	Roope Korhonen	37
1	3	Roberto Daprà	27
12	4	Nikolay Gryazin	27
2	5	Robert Virves	25

Challenger Co-drivers' Standings
Move	Pos.	Driver	Points
	1	Guillaume Mercoiret	50
	2	Anssi Viinikka	40
1	3	Luca Guglielmetti	29
12	4	Konstantin Aleksandrov	27
2	5	Jakko Viilo	25

=== WRC3 Rally3 ===
==== Classification ====
Position		No.	Driver	Co-driver	Entrant	Car	Time	Difference	Points
Event	Class	No.	Driver	Co-driver	Entrant	Car	Time	Difference	Points
16	1	49	Ali Türkkan	Oytun Albayrak	Castrol Ford Team Türkiye	Ford Fiesta Rally3	3:07:01.1	0.0	25
20	2	50	Gil Membrado	Adrián Pérez	Gil Membrado	Ford Fiesta Rally3	3:11:49.0	+4:47.9	17
21	3	51	Kerem Kazaz	Corentin Silvestre	Team Petrol Ofisi	Ford Fiesta Rally3	3:13:26.0	+6:24.9	15
22	4	48	Raúl Hernández	José Murado	Raúl Hernández	Ford Fiesta Rally3	3:15:31.0	+8:29.9	12
26	5	45	Nicolas Otto Boehringer	Hugo Magalhães	Nicolas Otto Boehringer	Ford Fiesta Rally3	3:26:27.1	+19:26.0	10
35	6	43	Matteo Fontana	Alessandro Arnaboldi	Matteo Fontana	Ford Fiesta Rally3	3:48:13.3	+41:12.2	8
Retired SS17		44	Ghjuvanni Rossi	Kylian Sarmezan	Ghjuvanni Rossi	Ford Fiesta Rally3	Mechanical		0

==== Special stages ====
Stage	Winners	Car	Time	Class leaders
SD	Fontana / Arnaboldi	Ford Fiesta Rally3	2:35.8	—N/a
SS1	Fontana / Arnaboldi	Ford Fiesta Rally3	9:11.6	Fontana / Arnaboldi
SS2	Fontana / Arnaboldi	Ford Fiesta Rally3	8:24.3	Fontana / Arnaboldi
SS3	Fontana / Arnaboldi	Ford Fiesta Rally3	14:42.4	Fontana / Arnaboldi
SS4	Türkkan / Albayrak	Ford Fiesta Rally3	7:35.7	Fontana / Arnaboldi
SS5	Türkkan / Albayrak	Ford Fiesta Rally3	9:08.2	Türkkan / Albayrak
SS6	Fontana / Arnaboldi	Ford Fiesta Rally3	8:31.1	Türkkan / Albayrak
SS7	Fontana / Arnaboldi	Ford Fiesta Rally3	14:44.1	Türkkan / Albayrak
SS8	Türkkan / Albayrak	Ford Fiesta Rally3	7:32.3	Türkkan / Albayrak
SS9	Türkkan / Albayrak	Ford Fiesta Rally3	9:42.0	Türkkan / Albayrak
SS10	Fontana / Arnaboldi	Ford Fiesta Rally3	6:29.7	Türkkan / Albayrak
SS11	Türkkan / Albayrak	Ford Fiesta Rally3	15:35.5	Türkkan / Albayrak
SS12	Fontana / Arnaboldi	Ford Fiesta Rally3	5:26.0	Türkkan / Albayrak
SS13	Fontana / Arnaboldi	Ford Fiesta Rally3	5:17.8	Türkkan / Albayrak
SS14	Fontana / Arnaboldi	Ford Fiesta Rally3	15:21.1	Türkkan / Albayrak
SS15	Türkkan / Albayrak	Ford Fiesta Rally3	6:28.3	Türkkan / Albayrak
SS16	Türkkan / Albayrak	Ford Fiesta Rally3	9:38.8	Türkkan / Albayrak
SS17	Türkkan / Albayrak	Ford Fiesta Rally3	8:12.0	Türkkan / Albayrak
SS18	Türkkan / Albayrak	Ford Fiesta Rally3	7:46.8	Türkkan / Albayrak
SS19	Türkkan / Albayrak	Ford Fiesta Rally3	8:05.2	Türkkan / Albayrak
SS20	Fontana / Arnaboldi	Ford Fiesta Rally3	7:54.8	Türkkan / Albayrak

==== Championship standings ====
Drivers' Standings
Move	Pos.	Driver	Points
	1	Matteo Fontana	50
	2	Eric Royère	33
	3	Georgios Vasilakis	31
8	4	Ali Türkkan	29
4	5	Gil Membrado	29

Co-drivers' Standings
Move	Pos.	Driver	Points
	1	Alessandro Arnaboldi	50
	2	Alexis Grenier	33
	3	Allan Harryman	31
8	4	Oytun Albayrak	29
4	5	Adrián Pérez	29

=== Junior WRC Rally3 ===
==== Classification ====
Position		No.	Driver	Co-driver	Entrant	Car	Time	Difference	Points	
Event	Class	No.	Driver	Co-driver	Entrant	Car	Time	Difference	Class	Stage
16	1	49	Ali Türkkan	Oytun Albayrak	Castrol Ford Team Türkiye	Ford Fiesta Rally3	3:07:01.1	0.0	25	4
17	2	47	Calle Carlberg	Jørgen Eriksen	Calle Carlberg	Ford Fiesta Rally3	3:07:18.4	+17.3	17	14
19	3	52	Craig Rahill	Conor Smith	Motorsport Ireland Rally Academy	Ford Fiesta Rally3	3:10:29.4	+3:28.3	15	2
20	4	50	Gil Membrado	Adrián Pérez	Gil Membrado	Ford Fiesta Rally3	3:11:49.0	+4:47.9	12	0
21	5	51	Kerem Kazaz	Corentin Silvestre	Team Petrol Ofisi	Ford Fiesta Rally3	3:13:26.0	+6:24.9	10	0
22	6	48	Raúl Hernández	José Murado	Raúl Hernández	Ford Fiesta Rally3	3:15:31.0	+8:29.9	8	0
31	7	47	Leevi Lassila	Mikko Lukka	Leevi Lassila	Ford Fiesta Rally3	3:40:39.1	+33:38.0	6	0

==== Special stages ====
Stage	Winners	Car	Time	Class leaders
SD	Türkkan / Albayrak	Ford Fiesta Rally3	2:37.3	—N/a
SS1	Carlberg / Eriksen	Ford Fiesta Rally3	9:09.2	Carlberg / Eriksen
SS2	Carlberg / Eriksen	Ford Fiesta Rally3	8:34.9	Carlberg / Eriksen
SS3	Rahill / Smith	Ford Fiesta Rally3	14:48.3	Carlberg / Eriksen
SS4	Carlberg / Eriksen	Ford Fiesta Rally3	7:34.5	Carlberg / Eriksen
SS5	Türkkan / Albayrak	Ford Fiesta Rally3	9:08.2	Carlberg / Eriksen
SS6	Carlberg / Eriksen	Ford Fiesta Rally3	8:26.2	Carlberg / Eriksen
SS7	Carlberg / Eriksen	Ford Fiesta Rally3	14:42.2	Carlberg / Eriksen
SS8	Türkkan / Albayrak	Ford Fiesta Rally3	7:32.3	Carlberg / Eriksen
SS9	Türkkan / Albayrak	Ford Fiesta Rally3	9:42.0	Carlberg / Eriksen
SS10	Carlberg / Eriksen	Ford Fiesta Rally3	6:30.6	Carlberg / Eriksen
SS11	Rahill / Smith	Ford Fiesta Rally3	15:30.6	Türkkan / Albayrak
SS12	Carlberg / Eriksen	Ford Fiesta Rally3	5:16.4	Türkkan / Albayrak
SS13	Carlberg / Eriksen	Ford Fiesta Rally3	5:13.9	Türkkan / Albayrak
SS14	Carlberg / Eriksen	Ford Fiesta Rally3	15:24.4	Türkkan / Albayrak
SS15	Carlberg / Eriksen	Ford Fiesta Rally3	6:21.7	Türkkan / Albayrak
SS16	Carlberg / Eriksen	Ford Fiesta Rally3	9:35.4	Türkkan / Albayrak
SS17	Carlberg / Eriksen	Ford Fiesta Rally3	8:04.3	Türkkan / Albayrak
SS18	Türkkan / Albayrak	Ford Fiesta Rally3	7:46.8	Türkkan / Albayrak
SS19	Carlberg / Eriksen	Ford Fiesta Rally3	8:03.9	Türkkan / Albayrak
SS20	Carlberg / Eriksen	Ford Fiesta Rally3	7:54.0	Türkkan / Albayrak

==== Championship standings ====
Drivers' Standings
Move	Pos.	Driver	Points
	1	Calle Carlberg	68
2	2	Ali Türkkan	43
1	3	Leevi Lassila	24
1	4	Gil Membrado	24
2	5	Raúl Hernández	23

Co-drivers' Standings
Move	Pos.	Driver	Points
	1	Jørgen Eriksen	68
2	2	Oytun Albaykar	43
1	3	Mikko Lukka	24
1	4	Adrián Pérez	24
2	5	José Murado	23

Previous rally: 2026 Safari Rally	2026 FIA World Rally Championship	Next rally: 2026 Rally Islas Canarias
Previous rally: 2025 Croatia Rally	2026 Croatia Rally	Next rally: 2027 Croatia Rally
