= 2026 Rally Chile =

5th edition of the Rally Chile

2026 Rally Chile Rally Chile BIOBÍO 2026
Round 12 of 13 in the 2026 World Rally Championship
← Previous event	Next event →
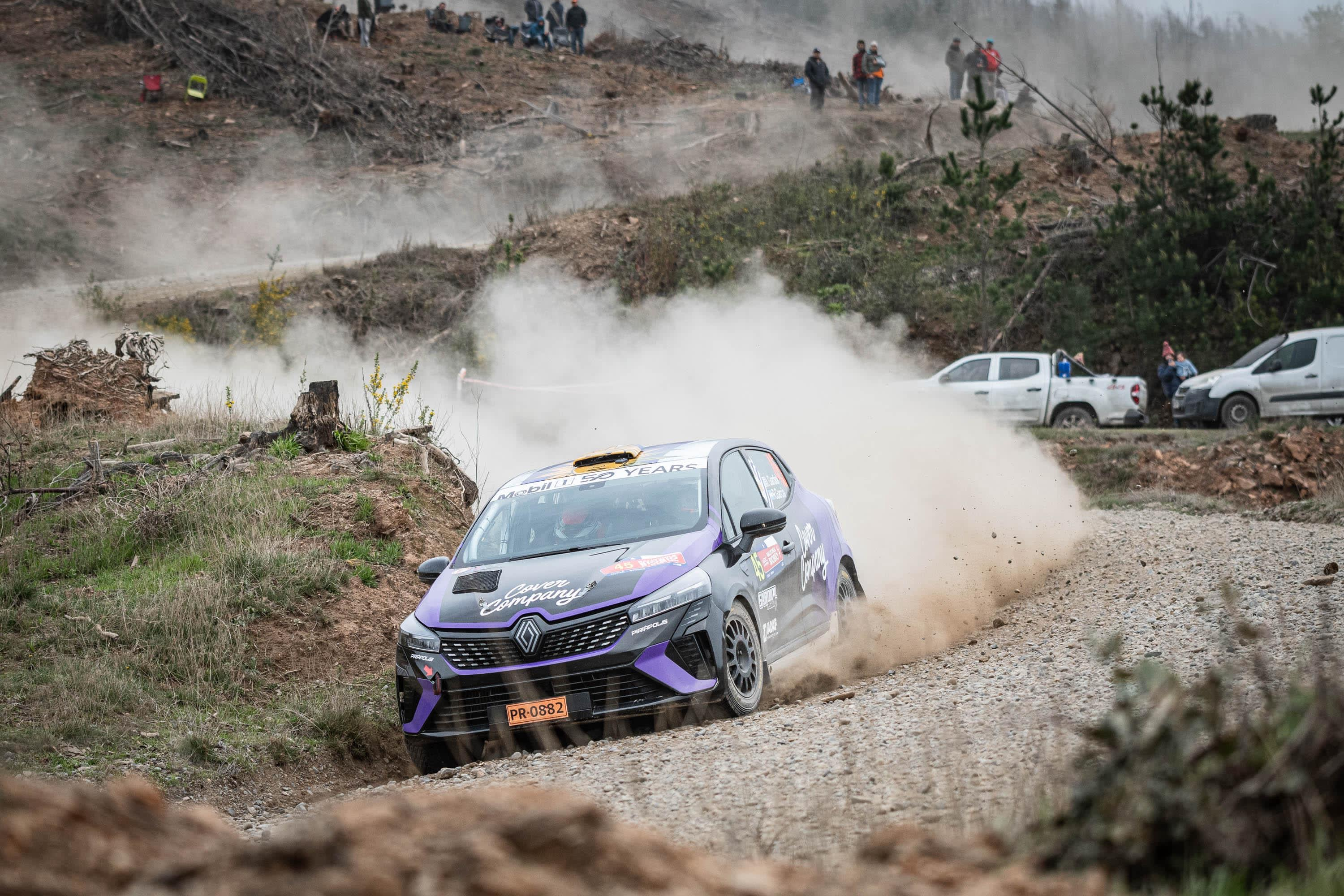
- The rally features smooth and well-built roads but requires demand precision.
- Host country: Chile
- Rally base: Talcahuano, Biobío
- Dates run: 10 – 13 September 2026
- Start location: Talcahuano, Biobío
- Finish location: Talcahuano, Biobío
- Stages: 16 (311.70 km; 193.68 miles)
- Stage surface: Gravel
- Transport distance: 865.91 km (538.05 miles)
- Overall distance: 1,177.61 km (731.73 miles)

Statistics
- Crews registered: 56
- Crews: 51 at start, 36 at finish

Overall results
- Overall winner: (Sweden) Oliver Solberg (United Kingdom) Elliott Edmondson (Japan) Toyota Gazoo Racing WRT; 2:57:08.2
- Sunday Accumulated leader: (France) Sébastien Ogier (France) Vincent Landais (Japan) Toyota Gazoo Racing WRT; 39:54.9
- Power Stage winner: (Sweden) Oliver Solberg (United Kingdom) Elliott Edmondson (Japan) Toyota Gazoo Racing WRT; 4:26.4

Support category results
- WRC-2 winner: (France) Yohan Rossel (France) Arnaud Dunand (Italy) Lancia Corse HF; 3:06:39.2
- WRC-3 winner: (Turkey) Ali Türkkan (Turkey) Bilge Ayan (Turkey) Castrol Ford Team Türkiye; 3:19:14.9
- J-WRC winner: (Finland) Leevi Lassila (Finland) Mikko Lukka; 3:17:54.6

The 2026 Rally Chile (also known as the Rally Chile BIOBÍO 2026) was a motor racing event for rally cars that was held over four days from 10 to 13 September 2026. It marked the fifth running of the Rally Chile, and was the twelfth round of the 2026 World Rally Championship, 2026 WRC2 Championship and 2026 WRC3 Championship. The event was also the final round of the 2026 Junior WRC Championship. The 2026 event was based in Talcahuano in the region of Biobío, and consisted of sixteen special stages, covering a total competitive distance of 311.70 km (193.68 mi).

Sébastien Ogier and Vincent Landais were the defending rally winners, and their team, Toyota Gazoo Racing WRT, were the defending manufacturer's winners. Oliver Solberg and Elliott Edmondson were the defending rally winners in the WRC2 championship, but they did not defend their titles as they were signed by Toyota to contest the top tier this season. Matteo Fontana and Alessandro Arnaboldi were the defending rally winners in the WRC3 championship.

Oliver Solberg and Elliott Edmondson won their second rally of the season, and Toyota successfully defended their manufacturer's title and become the 2026 Manufacturer's champion. Yohan Rossel and Arnaud Dunand were the winners in the WRC2 category. Ali Türkkan and Bilge Ayan were the winners in the WRC3 category. Ali Türkkan and Bilge Ayan were the winners in the junior category, while Türkkan's second-place finish in the category helped him secured the junior title.

== Background ==
=== Entry list ===
The following crews were entered into the rally. The event was opened to crews competing in the World Rally Championship, its support categories, the WRC2 Championship, the WRC3 Championship and privateer entries that were not registered to score points in any championship. Ten crews entered under Rally1 regulations, as were seventeen Rally2 crews in the WRC2 Championship and sixteen Rally3 crews in the WRC3 Championship. A total of seven crews participated in the Junior World Rally Championship.

Rally1 entries competing in the World Rally Championship
No.	Driver	Co-Driver	Entrant	Car	Championship eligibility	Tyre
1	(France) Sébastien Ogier	(France) Vincent Landais	(Japan) Toyota Gazoo Racing WRT	Toyota GR Yaris Rally1	Driver, Co-driver, Manufacturer	H
4	(Finland) Esapekka Lappi	(Finland) Enni Mälkönen	(South Korea) Hyundai Shell Mobis WRT	Hyundai i20 N Rally1	Driver, Co-driver, Manufacturer	H
5	(Finland) Sami Pajari	(Finland) Marko Salminen	(Japan) Toyota Gazoo Racing WRT2	Toyota GR Yaris Rally1	Driver, Co-driver, Manufacturer, Team	H
11	(Belgium) Thierry Neuville	(Belgium) Martijn Wydaeghe	(South Korea) Hyundai Shell Mobis WRT	Hyundai i20 N Rally1	Driver, Co-driver, Manufacturer	H
16	(France) Adrien Fourmaux	(France) Alexandre Coria	(South Korea) Hyundai Shell Mobis WRT	Hyundai i20 N Rally1	Driver, Co-driver, Manufacturer	H
18	(Japan) Takamoto Katsuta	(Republic of Ireland) James Fulton	(Japan) Toyota Gazoo Racing WRT	Toyota GR Yaris Rally1	Driver, Co-driver	H
33	(United Kingdom) Elfyn Evans	(United Kingdom) Scott Martin	(Japan) Toyota Gazoo Racing WRT	Toyota GR Yaris Rally1	Driver, Co-driver, Manufacturer	H
55	(Republic of Ireland) Josh McErlean	(Republic of Ireland) Eoin Treacy	(United Kingdom) M-Sport Ford WRT	Ford Puma Rally1	Driver, Co-driver, Manufacturer	H
95	(Republic of Ireland) Jon Armstrong	(Republic of Ireland) Shane Byrne	(United Kingdom) M-Sport Ford WRT	Ford Puma Rally1	Driver, Co-driver, Manufacturer	H
99	(Sweden) Oliver Solberg	(United Kingdom) Elliott Edmondson	(Japan) Toyota Gazoo Racing WRT	Toyota GR Yaris Rally1	Driver, Co-driver, Manufacturer	H

Rally2 entries competing in the WRC2 Championship
No.	Driver	Co-Driver	Entrant	Car	Championship eligibility	Tyre
20	(Estonia) Robert Virves	(Estonia) Jakko Viilo	(Germany) Toksport WRT 2	Škoda Fabia RS Rally2	Challenger Driver, Challenger Co-driver, Team	H
21	(Spain) Alejandro Cachón	(Spain) Borja Rozada	(Spain) Toyota España	Toyota GR Yaris Rally2	Challenger Driver, Co-driver	H
22	(Bulgaria) Nikolay Gryazin	(Kyrgyzstan) Konstantin Aleksandrov	(Italy) Lancia Corse HF	Lancia Ypsilon Rally2 HF Integrale	Challenger Driver, Challenger Co-driver, Team	H
23	(France) Yohan Rossel	(France) Arnaud Dunand	(Italy) Lancia Corse HF	Lancia Ypsilon Rally2 HF Integrale	Driver, Co-driver, Team	H
24	(Paraguay) Fabrizio Zaldivar	(Italy) Marcelo Der Ohannesian	(Paraguay) Fabrizio Zaldivar	Škoda Fabia RS Rally2	Challenger Driver, Challenger Co-driver	H
25	(Paraguay) Diego Domínguez Jr.	(Spain) Rogelio Peñate	(Paraguay) Diego Domínguez Jr.	Toyota GR Yaris Rally2	Challenger Driver, Challenger Co-driver	H
26	(United Kingdom) Gus Greensmith	(Sweden) Jonas Andersson	(United Kingdom) Gus Greensmith	Toyota GR Yaris Rally2	Driver, Co-driver	H
27	(Japan) Yuki Yamamoto	(Finland) Topi Luhtinen	(Finland) Printsport	Toyota GR Yaris Rally2	Challenger Driver, Co-driver	H
28	(Australia) Taylor Gill	(Australia) Daniel Brkic	(Germany) Toksport WRT 2	Škoda Fabia RS Rally2	Challenger Driver, Challenger Co-driver, Team	H
30	(Paraguay) Andrea Lafarja	(Paraguay) Germán Maune	(Paraguay) Andrea Lafarja	Toyota GR Yaris Rally2	Challenger/Masters Driver, Challenger Co-driver	H
31	(Chile) Jorge Martínez Fontena	(Argentina) Rubén García	(Chile) Jorge Martínez Fontena	Škoda Fabia RS Rally2	Challenger Driver, Challenger Co-driver	H
32	(Chile) Alberto Heller	(Argentina) Luis Allende	(Chile) Alberto Heller	Toyota GR Yaris Rally2	Driver, Co-driver	H
34	(Chile) Pedro Heller	(Argentina) Pablo Olmos	(Chile) Pedro Heller	Toyota GR Yaris Rally2	Challenger Driver, Challenger Co-driver	H
35	(Chile) Emilio Rosselot	(Chile) Matias Leiva	(Chile) Emilio Rosselot	Citroën C3 Rally2	Challenger Driver, Challenger Co-driver	H
36	(Chile) Tadeo Rosselot	(Chile) Matias Amestica	(Chile) Tadeo Rosselot	Citroën C3 Rally2	Challenger Driver, Challenger Co-driver	H
37	(France) Adrien Mosca	(France) Julie Amblard	(Finland) Printsport	Toyota GR Yaris Rally2	Challenger Driver, Challenger Co-driver	H
38	(Mexico) Miguel Granados	(Spain) Marc Martí	(Mexico) Miguel Granados	Škoda Fabia RS Rally2	Challenger/Masters Driver, Masters Co-driver	H

Rally3 entries competing in the WRC3 Championship and/or the Junior World Rally Championship
No.	Driver	Co-Driver	Entrant	Car	Class eligibility	Tyre
39	(France) Eric Royère	(Belgium) Maxime Andernack	(France) Eric Royère	Ford Fiesta Rally3	WRC3	H
40	(Peru) André Martinez	(Argentina) Matias Aranguren	(Peru) André Martinez	Ford Fiesta Rally3	WRC3	H
41	(Bolivia) Nataniel Bruun	(Argentina) Mario Javier del Riego	(Bolivia) Nataniel Bruun	Ford Fiesta Rally3	WRC3	H
42	(Greece) Georgios Vasilakis	(Republic of Ireland) Allan Harryman	(Greece) Georgios Vasilakis	Ford Fiesta Rally3	WRC3, Masters Driver, Masters Co-Driver	H
43	(India) Naveen Puligilla	(India) Musa Sherif	(India) Naveen Puligilla	Ford Fiesta Rally3	WRC3	H
44	(India) Dean Mascarenhas	(India) Gagan Karumbaiah	(India) Dean Mascarenhas	Ford Fiesta Rally3	WRC3	H
45	(Peru) Eduardo Castro	(Chile) Javiera Roman	(Peru) Eduardo Castro	Ford Fiesta Rally3	WRC3	H
46	(Uruguay) Ignacio Gardiol	(Argentina) Gonzalo Díaz	(Uruguay) Ignacio Gardiol	Ford Fiesta Rally3	WRC3	H
47	(Chile) Carlos Prieto	(Argentina) Juan Cruz Varela	(Chile) Carlos Prieto	Ford Fiesta Rally3	WRC3	H
48	(Chile) Eduardo Kovacs Bauer	(Argentina) Juan Pablo Carrera	(Chile) Eduardo Kovacs Bauer	Ford Fiesta Rally3	WRC3	H
49	(Chile) Patricio Muñoz	(Argentina) Miguel Recalt	(Chile) Patricio Muñoz	Ford Fiesta Rally3	WRC3	H
50	(Chile) Felipe Padilla	(Chile) Sebastián Olguín	(Chile) Felipe Padilla	Ford Fiesta Rally3	WRC3	H
51	(Sweden) Calle Carlberg	(Norway) Jørgen Eriksen	(Sweden) Calle Carlberg	Ford Fiesta Rally3	Junior WRC	H
52	(Turkey) Ali Türkkan	(Turkey) Bilge Ayan	(Turkey) Castrol Ford Team Türkiye	Ford Fiesta Rally3	WRC3, Junior WRC	H
53	(Spain) Gil Membrado	(Spain) Adrián Pérez	(Spain) Gil Membrado	Ford Fiesta Rally3	WRC3, Junior WRC	H
54	(Finland) Leevi Lassila	(Finland) Mikko Lukka	(Finland) Leevi Lassila	Ford Fiesta Rally3	Junior WRC	H
56	(Turkey) Kerem Kazaz	(France) Corentin Silvestre	(Turkey) Team Petrol Ofisi	Ford Fiesta Rally3	WRC3, Junior WRC	H
57	(Republic of Ireland) Craig Rahill	(Republic of Ireland) Conor Smith	(Republic of Ireland) Motorsport Ireland Rally Academy	Ford Fiesta Rally3	Junior WRC	H
58	(Chile) Gerardo V. Rosselot	(Argentina) Marcelo Brizio	(Chile) Gerardo V. Rosselot	Ford Fiesta Rally3	WRC3, Junior WRC	H
59	(Peru) Alex Heilbrunn	(Peru) Juan Pedro Cilloniz	(Peru) Alex Heilbrunn	Ford Fiesta Rally3	WRC3	H

Other major entries
No.	Driver	Co-Driver	Entrant	Car	Championship eligibility	Tyre
29	(Estonia) Romet Jürgenson	(Estonia) Siim Oja	(United Kingdom) M-Sport Ford WRT	Ford Fiesta Rally2	—N/a	H
61	(Peru) Jorge Martínez	(Argentina) Juan Pablo Monasterolo	(Peru) Jorge Martínez	Ford Fiesta Rally3	Masters Driver	H

=== Itinerary ===
All dates and times are CLT (UTC−3).

Date	No.	Time span	Stage name	Distance
10 September	—	After 9:01	El Manzano [Shakedown]	5.74 km
10 September		After 19:00	Ceremonial Start, Concepción	—N/a
11 September		After 7:00	Official Start, Talcahuano	—N/a
11 September	SS1	After 8:53	Turquía 1	22.94 km
11 September	SS2	After 9:48	Nuevo Rere 1	10.92 km
11 September	SS3	After 10:36	Hualqui 1	16.79 km
11 September		12:16 – 12:46	Regroup, Talcahuano	—N/a
11 September		12:46 – 13:16	Service A, Talcahuano	—N/a
11 September	SS4	After 15:09	Turquía 2	22.94 km
11 September	SS5	After 16:04	Nuevo Rere 2	10.92 km
11 September	SS6	After 16:52	Hualqui 2	16.79 km
11 September		18:32 – 18:42	Regroup, Talcahuano	—N/a
11 September		18:42 – 19:27	Flexi service B, Talcahuano	—N/a
11 September		After 19:27	Parc Fermé IN, Talcahuano	—N/a
12 September		After 8:05	Parc Fermé OUT, Talcahuano	—N/a
12 September	SS7	After 9:08	Pelún 1	15.65 km
12 September	SS8	After 10:01	Lota 1	25.64 km
12 September	SS9	After 11:05	Maria las Cruces 1	28.31 km
12 September		12:50 – 13:35	Regroup, Talcahuano	—N/a
12 September		13:35 – 14:05	Service C, Talcahuano	—N/a
12 September	SS10	After 9:08	Pelún 2	15.65 km
12 September	SS11	After 10:01	Lota 2	25.64 km
12 September	SS12	After 11:05	Maria las Cruces 2	28.31 km
12 September		18:50 – 19:00	Regroup, Talcahuano	—N/a
12 September		19:00 – 19:45	Flexi service D, Talcahuano	—N/a
12 September		After 19:45	Parc Fermé IN, Talcahuano	—N/a
13 September		After 7:20	Parc Fermé OUT, Talcahuano	—N/a
13 September	SS13	After 9:00	Carampangue 1	26.82 km
13 September	SS14	After 10:05	BioBio 1	8.78 km
13 September	SS15	After 11:13	Carampangue 2	26.82 km
13 September	SS16	After 13:15	BioBio 2 [Power Stage]	8.78 km
13 September		After 15:10	Official finish, Talcahuano	—N/a

== Report ==
=== WRC Rally1 ===
==== Classification ====
Position		No.	Driver	Co-driver	Entrant	Car	Time	Difference	Points			
Event	Class	No.	Driver	Co-driver	Entrant	Car	Time	Difference	Event	Sunday	Stage	Total
1	1	99	Oliver Solberg	Elliott Edmondson	Toyota Gazoo Racing WRT	Toyota GR Yaris Rally1	2:57:08.2	0.0	25	4	5	34
2	2	1	Sébastien Ogier	Julien Ingrassia	Toyota Gazoo Racing WRT	Toyota GR Yaris Rally1	2:57:24.8	+16.6	17	5	1	23
3	3	16	Adrien Fourmaux	Alexandre Coria	Hyundai Shell Mobis WRT	Hyundai i20 N Rally1	2:57:41.5	+33.3	15	3	0	18
4	4	5	Sami Pajari	Marko Salminen	Toyota Gazoo Racing WRT2	Toyota GR Yaris Rally1	2:58:42.1	+1:33.9	12	2	3	17
5	5	33	Elfyn Evans	Scott Martin	Toyota Gazoo Racing WRT	Toyota GR Yaris Rally1	2:59:30.5	+2:22.3	10	0	4	14
6	6	4	Esapekka Lappi	Enni Mälkönen	Hyundai Shell Mobis WRT	Hyundai i20 N Rally1	3:02:15.2	+5:07.0	8	0	0	8
7	7	55	Josh McErlean	Eoin Treacy	M-Sport Ford WRT	Ford Puma Rally1	3:04:39.7	+7:31.5	6	0	0	6
33	8	95	Jon Armstrong	Shane Byrne	M-Sport Ford WRT	Ford Puma Rally1	3:48:16.4	+51:08.2	0	0	0	0
36	9	18	Takamoto Katsuta	James Fulton	Toyota Gazoo Racing WRT	Toyota GR Yaris Rally1	3:59:26.4	+1:02:18.2	0	1	2	3
Retired SS7		11	Thierry Neuville	Martijn Wydaeghe	Hyundai Shell Mobis WRT	Hyundai i20 N Rally1	Rolled		0	0	0	0

==== Special stages ====
Stage	Winners	Car	Time	Class leaders
SD	Katsuta / Fulton	Toyota GR Yaris Rally1	4:16.2	—N/a
SS1	Solberg / Edmondson	Toyota GR Yaris Rally1	12:49.8	Solberg / Edmondson
SS2	Evans / Martin	Toyota GR Yaris Rally1	5:25.3	Evans / Martin
SS3	Neuville / Wydaeghe	Hyundai i20 N Rally1	8:51.7	Solberg / Edmondson
SS4	Pajari / Salminen	Toyota GR Yaris Rally1	12:03.2	Solberg / Edmondson
SS5	Ogier / Landais	Toyota GR Yaris Rally1	5:10.3	Solberg / Edmondson
SS6	Solberg / Edmondson	Toyota GR Yaris Rally1	8:15.0	Solberg / Edmondson
SS7	Ogier / Landais	Toyota GR Yaris Rally1	10:24.3	Solberg / Edmondson
SS8	Ogier / Landais	Toyota GR Yaris Rally1	15:18.7	Solberg / Edmondson
SS9	Solberg / Edmondson	Toyota GR Yaris Rally1	16:39.6	Solberg / Edmondson
SS10	Ogier / Landais	Toyota GR Yaris Rally1	10:14.6	Solberg / Edmondson
SS11	Ogier / Landais	Toyota GR Yaris Rally1	15:08.9	Solberg / Edmondson
SS12	Solberg / Edmondson	Toyota GR Yaris Rally1	16:26.6	Solberg / Edmondson
SS13	Evans / Martin	Toyota GR Yaris Rally1	15:30.9	Solberg / Edmondson
SS14	Solberg / Edmondson	Toyota GR Yaris Rally1	04:31.5	Solberg / Edmondson
SS15	Ogier / Landais	Toyota GR Yaris Rally1	15:16.5	Solberg / Edmondson
SS16	Solberg / Edmondson	Toyota GR Yaris Rally1	04:26.4	Solberg / Edmondson

==== Championship standings ====
- **Bold text** indicates 2026 World Champions.

Drivers' Standings
Move	Pos.	Driver	Points
	1	Elfyn Evans	230
	2	Sami Pajari	213
	3	Oliver Solberg	209
2	4	Sébastien Ogier	171
	5	Adrien Fourmaux	167

Co-drivers' Standings
Move	Pos.	Driver	Points
	1	Scott Martin	230
	2	Marko Salminen	213
	3	Elliott Edmondson	209
2	4	Aaron Johnston	171
	5	Alexandre Coria	167

Manufacturers' Standings
Move	Pos.	Driver	Points
	1	**Toyota Gazoo Racing WRT**	614
	2	Hyundai Shell Mobis WRT	410
	3	Toyota Gazoo Racing WRT2	227
	4	M-Sport Ford WRT	152

=== WRC2 Rally2 ===
==== Classification ====
Position		No.	Driver	Co-driver	Entrant	Car	Time	Difference	Points	
Event	Class	No.	Driver	Co-driver	Entrant	Car	Time	Difference	Class	Event
8	1	23	Yohan Rossel	Arnaud Dunand	Lancia Corse HF	Lancia Ypsilon Rally2 HF Integrale	3:21:09.0	0.0	25	4
9	2	20	Robert Virves	Jakko Viilo	Toksport WRT 2	Škoda Fabia RS Rally2	3:07:32.2	+53.0	17	2
10	3	26	Gus Greensmith	Jonas Andersson	Gus Greensmith	Toyota GR Yaris Rally2	3:08:06.4	+1:27.2	15	1
11	4	28	Taylor Gill	Daniel Brkic	Toksport WRT 2	Škoda Fabia RS Rally2	3:08:29.4	+1:50.2	12	0
12	5	31	Jorge Martínez Fontena	Rubén García	Jorge Martínez Fontena	Škoda Fabia RS Rally2	3:10:56.3	+4:17.1	10	0
13	6	25	Diego Domínguez Jr.	Rogelio Peñate	Diego Domínguez Jr.	Toyota GR Yaris Rally2	3:11:03.4	+4:24.2	8	0
14	7	32	Alberto Heller	Luis Allende	Alberto Heller	Toyota GR Yaris Rally2	3:11:43.5	+5:04.3	6	0
15	8	35	Emilio Rosselot	Matias Leiva	Emilio Rosselot	Citroën C3 Rally2	3:15:26.1	+8:46.9	4	0
16	9	34	Pedro Heller	Pablo Olmos	Pedro Heller	Toyota GR Yaris Rally2	3:15:29.7	+8:50.5	2	0
17	10	37	Adrien Mosca	Julie Amblard	Printsport	Toyota GR Yaris Rally2	3:16:37.4	+9:58.2	1	0
22	11	38	Miguel Granados	Marc Martí	Miguel Granados	Škoda Fabia RS Rally2	3:24:09.9	+17:30.7	0	0
Retired SS9		36	Tadeo Rosselot	Matias Amestica	Tadeo Rosselot	Citroën C3 Rally2	Withdrawn		0	0
Retired SS7		22	Nikolay Gryazin	Konstantin Aleksandrov	Lancia Corse HF	Lancia Ypsilon Rally2 HF Integrale	Rolled		0	0
Retired SS6		27	Yuki Yamamoto	Topi Luhtinen	Printsport	Toyota GR Yaris Rally2	Rolled		0	0
Retired SS6		21	Alejandro Cachón	Borja Rozada	Toyota España	Toyota GR Yaris Rally2	Accident		0	0
Retired SS5		24	Fabrizio Zaldivar	Marcelo Der Ohannesian	Fabrizio Zaldivar	Škoda Fabia RS Rally2	Rolled		0	0

==== Special stages ====
Overall
Stage	Winners	Car	Time	Class leaders
SD	Greensmith / Andersson	Toyota GR Yaris Rally2	4:28.4	—N/a
SS1	Gryazin / Aleksandrov	Lancia Ypsilon Rally2 HF Integrale	13:40.1	Gryazin / Aleksandrov
SS2	Gryazin / Aleksandrov	Lancia Ypsilon Rally2 HF Integrale	5:46.7	Gryazin / Aleksandrov
SS3	Rossel / Dunand	Lancia Ypsilon Rally2 HF Integrale	9:21.5	Gryazin / Aleksandrov
SS4	Rossel / Dunand	Lancia Ypsilon Rally2 HF Integrale	12:45.2	Gryazin / Aleksandrov
SS5	Virves / Viilo	Škoda Fabia RS Rally2	5:27.9	Gryazin / Aleksandrov
SS6	Virves / Viilo	Škoda Fabia RS Rally2	8:41.8	Gryazin / Aleksandrov
SS7	Rossel / Dunand	Lancia Ypsilon Rally2 HF Integrale	10:44.8	Rossel / Dunand
SS8	Rossel / Dunand	Lancia Ypsilon Rally2 HF Integrale	15:56.3	Rossel / Dunand
SS9	Rossel / Dunand	Lancia Ypsilon Rally2 HF Integrale	17:27.7	Rossel / Dunand
SS10	Rossel / Dunand	Lancia Ypsilon Rally2 HF Integrale	10:37.8	Rossel / Dunand
SS11	Rossel / Dunand	Lancia Ypsilon Rally2 HF Integrale	15:49.0	Rossel / Dunand
SS12	Rossel / Dunand	Lancia Ypsilon Rally2 HF Integrale	17:17.0	Rossel / Dunand
SS13	Rossel / Dunand	Lancia Ypsilon Rally2 HF Integrale	16:30.4	Rossel / Dunand
SS14	Greensmith / Andersson	Toyota GR Yaris Rally2	4:49.7	Rossel / Dunand
SS15	Virves / Viilo	Škoda Fabia RS Rally2	16:08.9	Rossel / Dunand
SS16	Virves / Viilo	Škoda Fabia RS Rally2	4:48.7	Rossel / Dunand

Challenger
Stage	Winners	Car	Time	Class leaders
SD	Gill / Brkic	Škoda Fabia RS Rally2	4:31.2	—N/a
SS1	Gryazin / Aleksandrov	Lancia Ypsilon Rally2 HF Integrale	13:40.1	Gryazin / Aleksandrov
SS2	Gryazin / Aleksandrov	Lancia Ypsilon Rally2 HF Integrale	5:46.7	Gryazin / Aleksandrov
SS3	Virves / Viilo	Škoda Fabia RS Rally2	9:24.9	Gryazin / Aleksandrov
SS4	Gryazin / Aleksandrov	Lancia Ypsilon Rally2 HF Integrale	12:46.5	Gryazin / Aleksandrov
SS5	Virves / Viilo	Škoda Fabia RS Rally2	5:27.9	Gryazin / Aleksandrov
SS6	Virves / Viilo	Škoda Fabia RS Rally2	8:41.8	Gryazin / Aleksandrov
SS7	Gill / Brkic	Škoda Fabia RS Rally2	11:00.6	Virves / Viilo
SS8	Virves / Viilo	Škoda Fabia RS Rally2	16:05.0	Virves / Viilo
SS9	Gill / Brkic	Škoda Fabia RS Rally2	17:44.3	Virves / Viilo
SS10	Virves / Viilo	Škoda Fabia RS Rally2	10:46.7	Virves / Viilo
SS11	Virves / Viilo	Škoda Fabia RS Rally2	15:54.6	Virves / Viilo
SS12	Gill / Brkic	Škoda Fabia RS Rally2	17:27.7	Virves / Viilo
SS13	Gill / Brkic	Škoda Fabia RS Rally2	16:31.2	Virves / Viilo
SS14	Gill / Brkic	Škoda Fabia RS Rally2	4:50.5	Virves / Viilo
SS15	Virves / Viilo	Škoda Fabia RS Rally2	16:08.9	Virves / Viilo
SS16	Virves / Viilo	Škoda Fabia RS Rally2	4:48.7	Virves / Viilo

==== Championship standings ====
Drivers' Standings
Move	Pos.	Driver	Points
	1	Robert Virves	117
5	2	Yohan Rossel	85
1	3	Roope Korhonen	79
1	4	Teemu Suninen	76
1	5	Nikolay Gryazin	66

Co-drivers' Standings
Move	Pos.	Driver	Points
	1	Jakko Viilo	117
5	2	Arnaud Dunand	85
1	3	Anssi Viinikka	79
1	4	Janni Hussi	76
1	5	Konstantin Aleksandrov	66

Manufacturers' Standings
Move	Pos.	Driver	Points
1	1	Lancia Corse HF	227
1	2	Toksport WRT	235
1	3	Toksport WRT 2	69
1	4	M-Sport Ford WRT	45
	5	2C Junior Team	37

Challenger Drivers' Standings
Move	Pos.	Driver	Points
	1	Robert Virves	125
	2	Roope Korhonen	94
	3	Léo Rossel	81
	4	Nikolay Gryazin	76
	5	Alejandro Cachón	74

Challenger Co-drivers' Standings
Move	Pos.	Driver	Points
	1	Jakko Viilo	125
	2	Anssi Viinikka	99
	3	Guillaume Mercoiret	85
	4	Konstantin Aleksandrov	79
	5	Rogelio Peñate	71

=== WRC3 Rally3 ===
==== Classification ====
Position		No.	Driver	Co-driver	Entrant	Car	Time	Difference	Points
Event	Class	No.	Driver	Co-driver	Entrant	Car	Time	Difference	Points
19	1	52	Ali Türkkan	Bilge Ayan	Castrol Ford Team Türkiye	Ford Fiesta Rally3	3:19:14.9	0.0	25
21	2	50	Felipe Padilla	Sebastián Olguín	Felipe Padilla	Ford Fiesta Rally3	3:23:03.2	+3:48.3	17
23	3	59	Alex Heilbrunn	Juan Pedro Cilloniz	Alex Heilbrunn	Ford Fiesta Rally3	3:25:20.2	+6:05.3	15
24	4	40	André Martinez	Matias Aranguren	André Martinez	Ford Fiesta Rally3	3:25:36.6	+6:21.7	12
25	5	45	Eduardo Castro	Javiera Roman	Eduardo Castro	Ford Fiesta Rally3	3:26:14.9	+7:00.0	10
26	6	53	Gil Membrado	Adrián Pérez	Gil Membrado	Ford Fiesta Rally3	3:26:27.8	+7:12.9	8
27	7	49	Patricio Muñoz	Miguel Recalt	Patricio Muñoz	Ford Fiesta Rally3	3:28:35.2	+9:20.3	6
28	8	44	Dean Mascarenhas	Gagan Karumbaiah	Dean Mascarenhas	Ford Fiesta Rally3	3:32:29.0	+13:14.1	4
30	9	47	Carlos Prieto	Juan Cruz Varela	Carlos Prieto	Ford Fiesta Rally3	3:37:08.8	+17:53.9	2
31	10	39	Eric Royère	Maxime Andernack	Eric Royère	Ford Fiesta Rally3	3:39:11.7	+19:56.8	1
32	11	42	Georgios Vasilakis	Allan Harryman	Georgios Vasilakis	Ford Fiesta Rally3	3:43:16.2	+24:01.3	0
34	12	43	Naveen Puligilla	Musa Sherif	Naveen Puligilla	Ford Fiesta Rally3	3:52:53.8	+33:38.9	0
Retired SS15		46	Ignacio Gardiol	Gonzalo Díaz	Ignacio Gardiol	Ford Fiesta Rally3	Withdrawn		0
Retired SS6		58	Gerardo V. Rosselot	Marcelo Brizio	Gerardo V. Rosselot	Ford Fiesta Rally3	Mechanical		0
Retired SS3		48	Eduardo Kovacs Bauer	Juan Pablo Carrera	Eduardo Kovacs Bauer	Ford Fiesta Rally3	Medical reasons		0
Retired SS1		56	Kerem Kazaz	Corentin Silvestre	Team Petrol Ofisi	Ford Fiesta Rally3	Mechanical		0

==== Special stages ====
Stage	Winners	Car	Time	Class leaders
SD	Kazaz / Silvestre	Ford Fiesta Rally3	4:39.2	—N/a
SS1	Membrado / Pérez	Ford Fiesta Rally3	14:11.4	Membrado / Pérez
SS2	Membrado / Pérez	Ford Fiesta Rally3	6:06.2	Membrado / Pérez
SS3	Membrado / Pérez	Ford Fiesta Rally3	9:46.8	Membrado / Pérez
SS4	Türkkan / Ayan	Ford Fiesta Rally3	13:28.1	Membrado / Pérez
SS5	Türkkan / Ayan	Ford Fiesta Rally3	5:51.6	Membrado / Pérez
SS6	stage cancelled			
SS7	Türkkan / Ayan	Ford Fiesta Rally3	11:22.5	Türkkan / Ayan
SS8	Türkkan / Ayan	Ford Fiesta Rally3	16:46.2	Türkkan / Ayan
SS9	Türkkan / Ayan	Ford Fiesta Rally3	18:26.9	Türkkan / Ayan
SS10	Türkkan / Ayan	Ford Fiesta Rally3	11:08.3	Türkkan / Ayan
SS11	Türkkan / Ayan	Ford Fiesta Rally3	16:28.8	Türkkan / Ayan
SS12	Membrado / Pérez	Ford Fiesta Rally3	18:34.7	Türkkan / Ayan
SS13	Membrado / Pérez	Ford Fiesta Rally3	17:32.8	Türkkan / Ayan
SS14	Membrado / Pérez	Ford Fiesta Rally3	5:10.9	Türkkan / Ayan
SS15	Membrado / Pérez	Ford Fiesta Rally3	17:10.3	Türkkan / Ayan
SS16	Membrado / Pérez	Ford Fiesta Rally3	5:05.1	Türkkan / Ayan

==== Championship standings ====
Drivers' Standings
Move	Pos.	Driver	Points
	1	Matteo Fontana	117
	2	Gil Membrado	99
	3	Tymoteusz Abramowski	91
4	4	Ali Türkkan	77
1	5	Nataniel Bruun	61

Co-drivers' Standings
Move	Pos.	Driver	Points
	1	Alessandro Arnaboldi	117
	2	Adrián Pérez	99
	3	Jakub Wróbel	91
	4	Oytun Albayrak	56
	5	Kylian Sarmezan	55

=== Junior WRC Rally3 ===
==== Classification ====
Position		No.	Driver	Co-driver	Entrant	Car	Time	Difference	Points	
Event	Class	No.	Driver	Co-driver	Entrant	Car	Time	Difference	Class	Stage
18	1	54	Leevi Lassila	Mikko Lukka	Leevi Lassila	Ford Fiesta Rally3	3:17:54.6	0.0	50	2
19	2	52	Ali Türkkan	Bilge Ayan	Castrol Ford Team Türkiye	Ford Fiesta Rally3	3:19:14.9	+1:20.3	34	4
20	3	57	Craig Rahill	Conor Smith	Motorsport Ireland Rally Academy	Ford Fiesta Rally3	3:21:52.9	+3:58.3	30	1
26	4	53	Gil Membrado	Adrián Pérez	Gil Membrado	Ford Fiesta Rally3	3:26:27.8	+8:33.2	24	5
Retired SS11		51	Calle Carlberg	Jørgen Eriksen	Calle Carlberg	Ford Fiesta Rally3	Accident		0	3
Retired SS6		58	Gerardo V. Rosselot	Marcelo Brizio	Gerardo V. Rosselot	Ford Fiesta Rally3	Mechanical		0	0
Retired SS1		56	Kerem Kazaz	Corentin Silvestre	Team Petrol Ofisi	Ford Fiesta Rally3	Medical reasons		0	0

==== Special stages ====
Stage	Winners	Car	Time	Class leaders
SD	Kazaz / Silvestre	Ford Fiesta Rally3	4:39.2	—N/a
SS1	Membrado / Pérez	Ford Fiesta Rally3	14:11.4	Membrado / Pérez
SS2	Membrado / Pérez	Ford Fiesta Rally3	6:06.2	Membrado / Pérez
SS3	Membrado / Pérez	Ford Fiesta Rally3	9:46.8	Membrado / Pérez
SS4	Lassila / Lukka	Ford Fiesta Rally3	13:28.1	Lassila / Lukka
SS5	Carlberg / Eriksen	Ford Fiesta Rally3	5:51.6	Lassila / Lukka
SS6	stage cancelled			
SS7	Türkkan / Ayan	Ford Fiesta Rally3	11:22.5	Lassila / Lukka
SS8	Türkkan / Ayan	Ford Fiesta Rally3	16:46.2	Lassila / Lukka
SS9	Carlberg / Eriksen	Ford Fiesta Rally3	18:13.6	Lassila / Lukka
SS10	Türkkan / Ayan	Ford Fiesta Rally3	11:08.3	Lassila / Lukka
SS11	Türkkan / Ayan	Ford Fiesta Rally3	16:28.8	Türkkan / Ayan
SS12	Rahill / Smith	Ford Fiesta Rally3	18:24.1	Türkkan / Ayan
SS13	Membrado / Pérez	Ford Fiesta Rally3	17:32.8	Lassila / Lukka
SS14	Membrado / Pérez	Ford Fiesta Rally3	5:10.9	Lassila / Lukka
SS15	Membrado / Pérez	Ford Fiesta Rally3	17:10.3	Lassila / Lukka
SS16	Membrado / Pérez	Ford Fiesta Rally3	5:05.1	Lassila / Lukka

==== Championship standings ====
- **Bold text** indicates 2026 World Champions.

Drivers' Standings
Move	Pos.	Driver	Points
1	1	**Ali Türkkan**	130
2	2	Leevi Lassila	113
	3	Gil Membrado	100
3	4	Calle Carlberg	98
2	5	Craig Rahill	58

Co-drivers' Standings
Move	Pos.	Driver	Points
3	1	**Mikko Lukka**	113
1	2	Adrián Pérez	100
1	3	Jørgen Eriksen	98
2	4	Oytun Albaykar	74
2	5	Conor Smith	58

Previous rally: 2026 Rally del Paraguay	2026 FIA World Rally Championship	Next rally: 2026 Rally Italia Sardegna
Previous rally: 2025 Rally Chile	2026 Rally Chile	Next rally: 2027 Rally Chile
