= Léo Rossel =

French rally driver

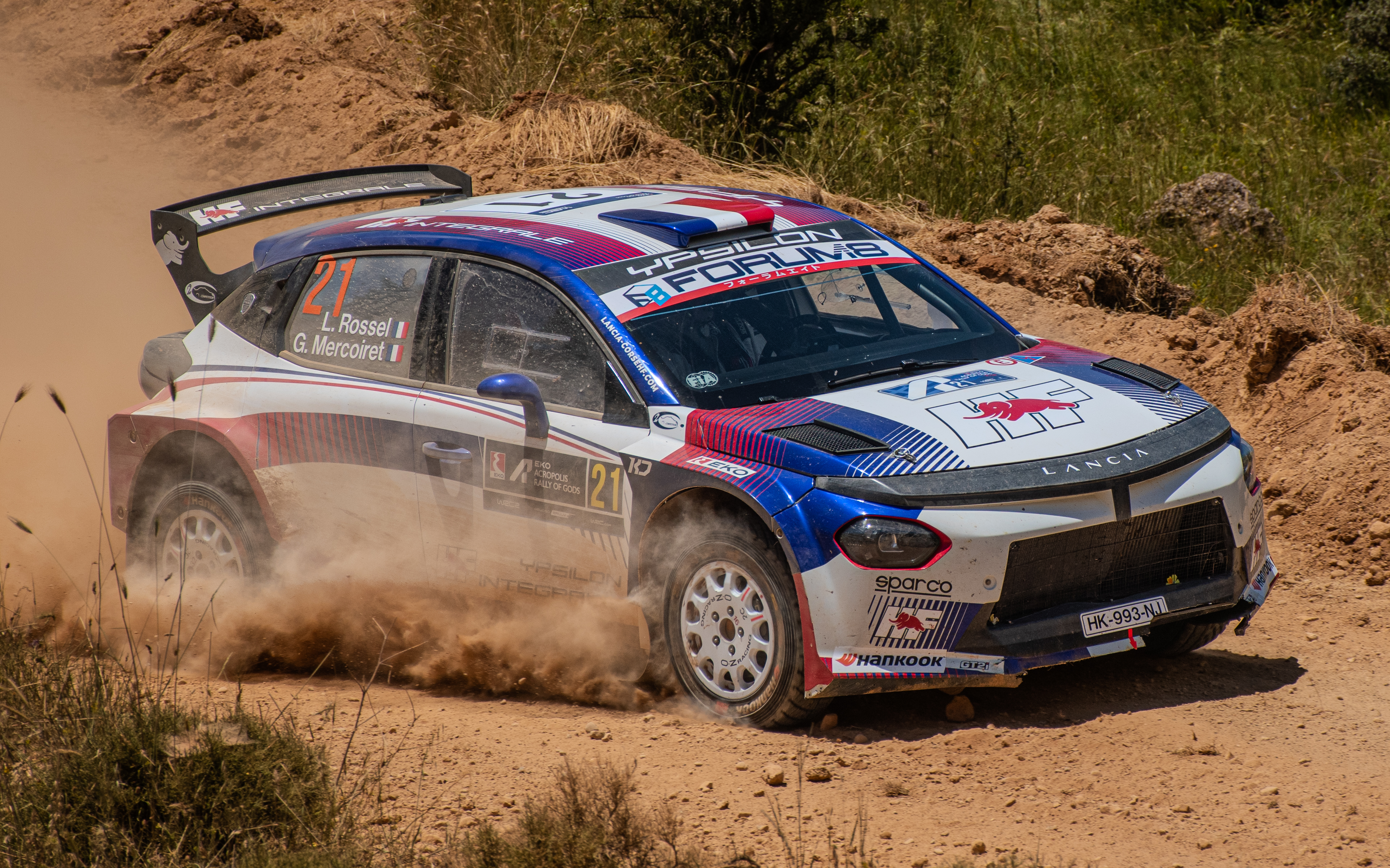
- Léo Rossel and co-driver Guillaume Mercoiret on Lancia Ypsilon Rally2 HF Integrale at the 2026 Acropolis Rally
- Nationality: (France) French
- Born: 20 November 1997 (age 28) Nîmes, France
- Relatives: Yohan Rossel (brother)
World Rally Championship record
- Years active: 2025–present
- Co-driver: Guillaume Mercoiret
- Teams: PH Sport, 2C Junior Team
- Rallies: 10
- Championships: 0
- Rally wins: 0
- Podiums: 0
- Stage wins: 0
- Total points: 18
- First rally: 2025 Monte Carlo Rally
- Last rally: 2026 Croatia Rally

Léo Rossel (born 20 November 1997) is a French rally driver. He is the younger brother of Yohan Rossel, and competes for PH Sport in the WRC2 Championship.

== Biography ==
Rossel made his rally career debut in 2016. He was signed by Citroën Racing in 2023, and won the French Rally Championship in the following year. He made his WRC debut at the 2025 Monte Carlo Rally, joining his brother Yohan Rossel to drive for PH Sport to compete in the WRC2 category.

== Rally results ==
=== WRC results ===
Year	Entrant	Car	1	2	3	4	5	6	7	8	9	10	11	12	13	14	Pos.	Points
2025	PH Sport	Citroën C3 Rally2	MON; 11	SWE	KEN	ESP; Ret	POR; 23	ITA; Ret	GRE; 16	EST	FIN; Ret	PAR	CHL	EUR; Ret	JPN	SAU	NC	0
2026	2C Junior Team	Citroën C3 Rally2	MON; 6	SWE	KEN	CRO; 5	ESP; 14	POR	JPN	GRE; 14	EST	FIN; 19	PAR	CHL	ITA; Ret	SAU; C	14th	18

=== WRC2 results ===
Year	Entrant	Car	1	2	3	4	5	6	7	8	9	10	11	12	13	14	Pos.	Points
2025	PH Sport	Citroën C3 Rally2	MON; 3	SWE	KEN	ESP; Ret	POR; 13	ITA; Ret	GRE; 9	EST	FIN; Ret	PAR	CHL	EUR; Ret	JPN	SAU	20th	17
2026	2C Junior Team	Citroën C3 Rally2	MON; 1	SWE	KEN	CRO; 2	ESP; 5	POR	JPN	GRE; 6	EST	FIN; 8	PAR	CHL	ITA; Ret	SAU; C	7th	64

* Season still in progress.
