= 2026 Rally Japan =

11th edition of the Rally Japan

2026 Rally Japan FORUM8 Rally Japan 2026
Round 7 of 13 in the 2026 World Rally Championship
← Previous event	Next event →
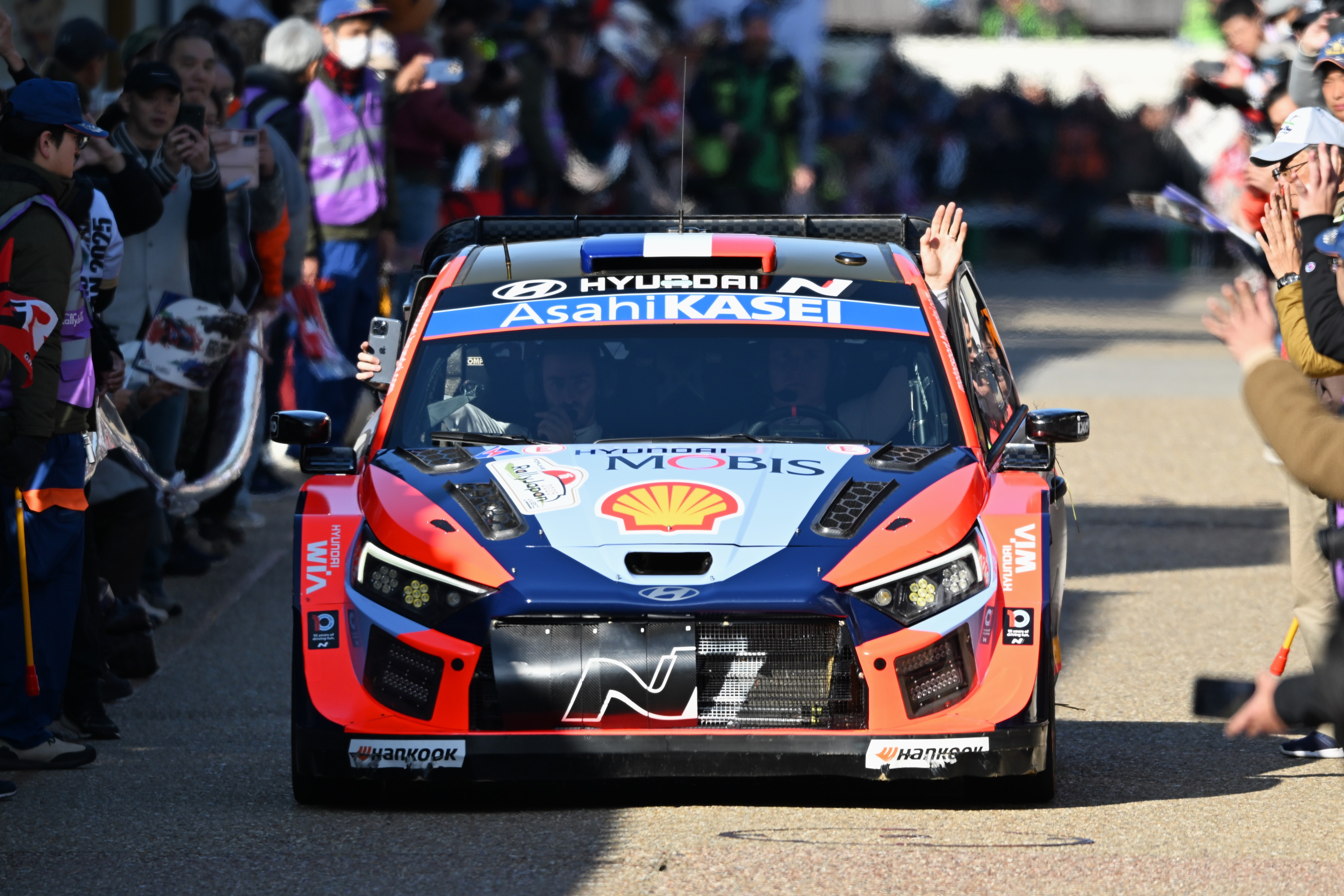
- The schedule of Rally Japan has moved ahead to May.
- Host country: Japan
- Rally base: Toyota, Aichi Prefecture
- Dates run: 28 – 31 May 2026
- Start location: Asuke, Higashikamo, Aichi
- Finish location: Shimoyama, Higashikamo, Aichi
- Stages: 20 (302.82 km; 188.16 miles)
- Stage surface: Tarmac
- Transport distance: 602.45 km (374.35 miles)
- Overall distance: 905.27 km (562.51 miles)

Statistics
- Crews registered: 32
- Crews: 32 at start, 29 at finish

Overall results
- Overall winner: (United Kingdom) Elfyn Evans (United Kingdom) Scott Martin (Japan) Toyota Gazoo Racing WRT; 3:17:08.0
- Sunday Accumulated leader: (Sweden) Oliver Solberg (United Kingdom) Elliott Edmondson (Japan) Toyota Gazoo Racing WRT; 44:46.0
- Power Stage winner: (Sweden) Oliver Solberg (United Kingdom) Elliott Edmondson (Japan) Toyota Gazoo Racing WRT; 8:36.2

Support category results
- WRC-2 winner: (Bulgaria) Nikolay Gryazin (Kyrgyzstan) Konstantin Aleksandrov; 3:26:29.3
- WRC-3 winner: (France) Ghjuvanni Rossi (France) Kylian Sarmezan; 3:45:52.5

The 2026 Rally Japan (also known as the FORUM8 Rally Japan 2026) was a motor racing event for rally cars held over four days from 28 to 31 May 2026. It marked the eleventh running of the Rally Japan, and was the seventh round of the 2026 World Rally Championship, 2026 WRC2 Championship and 2026 WRC3 Championship. The 2026 event was based in Nagoya in Chūbu Region, and was consisted of twenty special stages, covering a total competitive distance of 302.82 km (188.16 mi).

Sébastien Ogier and Vincent Landais were the defending rally winners, and Toyota Gazoo Racing WRT, were the defending manufacturer's winners. Alejandro Cachón and Borja Rozada were the defending rally winners in the WRC2 championship. Ghjuvanni Rossi and Kylian Sarmezan were the defending rally winners in the WRC3 championship.

Elfyn Evans and Scott Martin won their second rally of the season, and their team, Toyota, successfully defended their titles. Nikolay Gryazin and Konstantin Aleksandrov were the winners in the WRC2 category. Rossi and Sarmezan successfully defended their titles in the WRC3 category.

== Background ==
=== Entry list ===
The following crews entered into the rally. The event was opened to crews competing in the World Rally Championship, its support categories, the WRC2 Championship, the WRC3 Championship and privateer entries that were not registered to score points in any championship. Ten crews entered under Rally1 regulations, as were eleven Rally2 crews in the WRC2 Championship and three Rally3 crews in the WRC3 Championship.

Rally1 entries competing in the World Rally Championship
No.	Driver	Co-Driver	Entrant	Car	Championship eligibility	Tyre
1	(France) Sébastien Ogier	(France) Vincent Landais	(Japan) Toyota Gazoo Racing WRT	Toyota GR Yaris Rally1	Driver, Co-driver, Manufacturer	H
5	(Finland) Sami Pajari	(Finland) Marko Salminen	(Japan) Toyota Gazoo Racing WRT2	Toyota GR Yaris Rally1	Driver, Co-driver, Manufacturer, Team	H
11	(Belgium) Thierry Neuville	(Belgium) Martijn Wydaeghe	(South Korea) Hyundai Shell Mobis WRT	Hyundai i20 N Rally1	Driver, Co-driver, Manufacturer	H
16	(France) Adrien Fourmaux	(France) Alexandre Coria	(South Korea) Hyundai Shell Mobis WRT	Hyundai i20 N Rally1	Driver, Co-driver, Manufacturer	H
18	(Japan) Takamoto Katsuta	(Republic of Ireland) Aaron Johnston	(Japan) Toyota Gazoo Racing WRT	Toyota GR Yaris Rally1	Driver, Co-driver	H
20	(New Zealand) Hayden Paddon	(New Zealand) John Kennard	(South Korea) Hyundai Shell Mobis WRT	Hyundai i20 N Rally1	Driver, Co-driver, Manufacturer	H
33	(United Kingdom) Elfyn Evans	(United Kingdom) Scott Martin	(Japan) Toyota Gazoo Racing WRT	Toyota GR Yaris Rally1	Driver, Co-driver, Manufacturer	H
55	(Republic of Ireland) Josh McErlean	(Republic of Ireland) Eoin Treacy	(United Kingdom) M-Sport Ford WRT	Ford Puma Rally1	Driver, Co-driver, Manufacturer	H
95	(Republic of Ireland) Jon Armstrong	(Republic of Ireland) Shane Byrne	(United Kingdom) M-Sport Ford WRT	Ford Puma Rally1	Driver, Co-driver, Manufacturer	H
99	(Sweden) Oliver Solberg	(United Kingdom) Elliott Edmondson	(Japan) Toyota Gazoo Racing WRT	Toyota GR Yaris Rally1	Driver, Co-driver, Manufacturer	H

Rally2 entries competing in the WRC2 Championship
No.	Driver	Co-Driver	Entrant	Car	Championship eligibility	Tyre
21	(Bulgaria) Nikolay Gryazin	(Kyrgyzstan) Konstantin Aleksandrov	(Bulgaria) Nikolay Gryazin	Lancia Ypsilon Rally2 HF Integrale	Challenger Driver, Challenger Co-driver	H
22	(Spain) Alejandro Cachón	(Spain) Borja Rozada	(Spain) Toyota España	Toyota GR Yaris Rally2	Challenger Driver, Co-driver	H
23	(Finland) Emil Lindholm	(Brazil) Gabriel Morales	(Germany) Toksport WRT	Škoda Fabia RS Rally2	Driver, Co-driver	H
24	(Paraguay) Diego Domínguez Jr.	(Spain) Rogelio Peñate	(Paraguay) Diego Domínguez Jr.	Toyota GR Yaris Rally2	Challenger Driver, Challenger Co-driver	H
26	(Paraguay) Andrea Lafarja	(Spain) Andrés Blanco	(Paraguay) Andrea Lafarja	Toyota GR Yaris Rally2	Challenger/Masters Driver, Challenger Co-driver	H
27	(Japan) Yuki Yamamoto	(Republic of Ireland) James Fulton	(Finland) Printsport	Toyota GR Yaris Rally2	Challenger Driver, Co-driver	H
28	(Japan) Hiroki Arai	(Japan) Hiroki Tachikui	(Japan) R2R×YAHAGI Racing Team	Toyota GR Yaris Rally2	Challenger Driver, Challenger Co-driver	H
29	(Japan) Norihiko Katsuta	(Japan) Takahiro Yasui	(Japan) Toyota Gazoo Racing WRJ	Toyota GR Yaris Rally2	Challenger/Masters Driver, Challenger Co-driver	H
30	(Japan) Fumio Nutahara	(Japan) Shungo Azuma	(Japan) Fumio Nutahara	Toyota GR Yaris Rally2	Challenger/Masters Driver, Challenger Co-driver	H
31	(Japan) Osamu Fukunaga	(Japan) Misako Saida	(Japan) Osamu Fukunaga	Škoda Fabia RS Rally2	Challenger/Masters Driver, Challenger/Masters Co-driver	H
32	(Japan) Satoshi Imai	(Japan) Yuki Ogawa	(Japan) Satoshi Imai	Citroën C3 Rally2	Challenger/Masters Driver, Challenger Co-driver	H

Rally3 entries competing in the WRC3 Championship
No.	Driver	Co-Driver	Entrant	Car	Class/Championship eligibility	Tyre
34	(Greece) Georgios Vasilakis	(Republic of Ireland) Allan Harryman	(Greece) Georgios Vasilakis	Ford Fiesta Rally3	WRC3, Masters Driver, Masters Co-Driver	H
35	(France) Ghjuvanni Rossi	(France) Kylian Sarmezan	(France) Ghjuvanni Rossi	Ford Fiesta Rally3	WRC3	H
36	(Germany) Nicolas Otto Boehringer	(Portugal) Hugo Magalhães	(Germany) Nicolas Otto Boehringer	Ford Fiesta Rally3	WRC3	H

Other major entries
No.	Driver	Co-Driver	Entrant	Car	Tyre
25	(Estonia) Romet Jürgenson	(Estonia) Siim Oja	(United Kingdom) M-Sport Ford WRT	Ford Fiesta Rally2	H

=== Itinerary ===
All dates and times are JST (UTC+9).

Date	No.	Time span	Stage name	Distance
28 May	—	After 8:01	Kuragaike Park [Shakedown]	2.53 km
28 May		After 18:00	Opening ceremony	—N/a
29 May	SS1	After 8:03	Asuke 1	12.90 km
29 May	SS2	After 8:46	Isegami's Tunnel 1	24.29 km
29 May	SS3	After 10:09	Inabu / Shitara 1	17.08 km
29 May		11:54 – 12:24	Regroup, Toyota Stadium	—N/a
29 May		12:24 – 12:54	Service A, Toyota Stadium	—N/a
29 May	SS4	After 13:57	Asuke 2	12.90 km
29 May	SS5	After 14:40	Isegami's Tunnel 2	24.29 km
29 May	SS6	After 16:03	Inabu / Shitara 2	17.08 km
29 May		18:28 – 19:13	Flexi service B, Toyota Stadium	—N/a
30 May		6:18 – 6:33	Service C, Toyota Stadium	—N/a
30 May	SS7	After 7:41	Obara 1	16.44 km
30 May	SS8	After 8:54	Ena 1	21.16 km
30 May	SS9	After 10:35	Obara 1	19.32 km
30 May		11:15 – 12:04	Regroup, Enakyo Park	—N/a
30 May		12:04 – 12:19	Tyre fitting zone, Enakyo Park	—N/a
30 May	SS10	After 13:05	Obara 2	19.32 km
30 May	SS11	After 14:38	Ena 2	21.16 km
30 May	SS12	After 15:56	Obara 2	16.44 km
30 May		16:56 – 17:09	Regroup, Aichi Greenery Center	—N/a
30 May	SS13	After 17:15	Fujioka SSS 1	3.19 km
30 May	SS14	After 17:38	Fujioka SSS 2	3.19 km
30 May		18:33 – 19:18	Flexi service D, Toyota Stadium	—N/a
31 May		7:01 – 7:16	Service E, Toyota Stadium	—N/a
31 May	SS15	After 8:14	Nukata 1	20.49 km
31 May	SS16	After 9:05	Lake Mikawako 1	13.98 km
31 May	SS17	After 10:13	Kuragaike SSS 1	2.56 km
31 May	SS18	After 10:32	Kuragaike SSS 2	2.56 km
31 May		10:57 – 11:17	Regroup, Toyota Stadium	—N/a
31 May		11:17 – 11:32	Service F, Toyota Stadium	—N/a
31 May	SS19	After 12:30	Nukata 2	20.49 km
31 May		13:15 – 14:10	Regroup, Mikawako Enchi	—N/a
31 May	SS20	After 14:15	Lake Mikawako 2 [Power Stage]	13.98 km
31 May		After 15:15	Podium ceremony, Shimoyama Health Centre	—N/a
31 May		After 15:45	Official finish	—N/a

== Report ==
=== WRC Rally1 ===
==== Classification ====
Position		No.	Driver	Co-driver	Entrant	Car	Time	Difference	Points			
Event	Class	No.	Driver	Co-driver	Entrant	Car	Time	Difference	Event	Sunday	Stage	Total
1	1	33	Elfyn Evans	Scott Martin	Toyota Gazoo Racing WRT	Toyota GR Yaris Rally1	3:17:08.0	0.0	25	2	1	28
2	2	1	Sébastien Ogier	Vincent Landais	Toyota Gazoo Racing WRT	Toyota GR Yaris Rally1	3:17:20.8	+12.8	17	3	3	23
3	3	5	Sami Pajari	Marko Salminen	Toyota Gazoo Racing WRT2	Toyota GR Yaris Rally1	3:17:59.4	+51.4	15	1	2	18
4	4	18	Takamoto Katsuta	Aaron Johnston	Toyota Gazoo Racing WRT	Toyota GR Yaris Rally1	3:18:11.5	+1:03.5	12	4	4	20
5	5	16	Adrien Fourmaux	Alexandre Coria	Hyundai Shell Mobis WRT	Hyundai i20 N Rally1	3:19:42.8	+2:34.8	10	0	0	10
6	6	11	Thierry Neuville	Martijn Wydaeghe	Hyundai Shell Mobis WRT	Hyundai i20 N Rally1	3:20:21.6	+3:13.6	8	0	0	8
7	7	20	Hayden Paddon	John Kennard	Hyundai Shell Mobis WRT	Hyundai i20 N Rally1	3:21:52.8	+4:44.8	6	0	0	6
8	8	95	Jon Armstrong	Shane Byrne	M-Sport Ford WRT	Ford Puma Rally1	3:22:53.2	+5:45.2	4	0	0	4
10	9	55	Josh McErlean	Eoin Treacy	M-Sport Ford WRT	Ford Puma Rally1	3:26:31.0	+9:23.0	1	0	0	1
21	10	99	Oliver Solberg	Elliott Edmondson	Toyota Gazoo Racing WRT	Toyota GR Yaris Rally1	4:06:51.6	+49:43.6	0	5	5	10

==== Special stages ====
Stage	Winners	Car	Time	Class leaders
SD	Ogier / Landais	Toyota GR Yaris Rally1	1:55.3	—N/a
SS1	Solberg / Edmondson	Toyota GR Yaris Rally1	7:29.0	Solberg / Edmondson
SS2	Evans / Martin	Toyota GR Yaris Rally1	19:00.2	Evans / Martin
SS3	Evans / Martin	Toyota GR Yaris Rally1	10:42.9	Evans / Martin
SS4	Solberg / Edmondson	Toyota GR Yaris Rally1	7:10.5	Evans / Martin
SS5	Evans / Martin	Toyota GR Yaris Rally1	18:15.0	Evans / Martin
SS6	Pajari / Salminen	Toyota GR Yaris Rally1	10:22.8	Evans / Martin
SS7	Solberg / Edmondson	Toyota GR Yaris Rally1	9:59.5	Evans / Martin
SS8	Evans / Martin	Toyota GR Yaris Rally1	15:00.3	Evans / Martin
SS9	Solberg / Edmondson	Toyota GR Yaris Rally1	12:34.7	Evans / Martin
SS10	Ogier / Landais	Toyota GR Yaris Rally1	12:30.2	Evans / Martin
SS11	Pajari / Salminen	Toyota GR Yaris Rally1	14:58.1	Evans / Martin
SS12	Evans / Martin	Toyota GR Yaris Rally1	9:59.7	Evans / Martin
SS13	Pajari / Salminen	Toyota GR Yaris Rally1	1:50.4	Evans / Martin
SS14	Pajari / Salminen	Toyota GR Yaris Rally1	1:48.6	Evans / Martin
SS15	Solberg / Edmondson	Toyota GR Yaris Rally1	11:52.4	Evans / Martin
SS16	Katsuta / Johnston	Toyota GR Yaris Rally1	8:40.8	Evans / Martin
SS17	Ogier / Landais	Toyota GR Yaris Rally1	1:55.8	Evans / Martin
SS18	Ogier / Landais	Toyota GR Yaris Rally1	1:54.5	Evans / Martin
SS19	Solberg / Edmondson	Toyota GR Yaris Rally1	11:45.0	Evans / Martin
SS20	Solberg / Edmondson	Toyota GR Yaris Rally1	8:36.2	Evans / Martin

==== Championship standings ====
Drivers' Standings
Move	Pos.	Driver	Points
	1	Elfyn Evans	151
	2	Takamoto Katsuta	131
	3	Oliver Solberg	102
1	4	Sami Pajari	96
1	5	Sébastien Ogier	90

Co-drivers' Standings
Move	Pos.	Driver	Points
	1	Scott Martin	151
	2	Aaron Johnston	131
	3	Elliott Edmondson	102
1	4	Marko Salminen	96
1	5	Vincent Landais	90

Manufacturers' Standings
Move	Pos.	Driver	Points
	1	Toyota Gazoo Racing WRT	370
	2	Hyundai Shell Mobis WRT	243
	3	Toyota Gazoo Racing WRT2	106
	4	M-Sport Ford WRT	85

=== WRC2 Rally2 ===
==== Classification ====
Position		No.	Driver	Co-driver	Entrant	Car	Time	Difference	Points	
Event	Class	No.	Driver	Co-driver	Entrant	Car	Time	Difference	Class	Event
9	1	21	Nikolay Gryazin	Konstantin Aleksandrov	Nikolay Gryazin	Lancia Ypsilon Rally2 HF Integrale	3:26:29.3	0.0	25	2
11	2	22	Alejandro Cachón	Borja Rozada	Toyota España	Toyota GR Yaris Rally2	3:26:47.6	+18.3	17	0
12	3	27	Yuki Yamamoto	James Fulton	Printsport	Toyota GR Yaris Rally2	3:29:23.7	+2:54.4	15	0
13	4	23	Emil Lindholm	Gabriel Morales	Toksport WRT	Škoda Fabia RS Rally2	3:30:19.6	+3:50.3	12	0
15	5	28	Hiroki Arai	Hiroki Tachikui	R2R×YAHAGI Racing Team	Toyota GR Yaris Rally2	3:34:06.9	+7:37.6	10	0
16	6	29	Norihiko Katsuta	Takahiro Yasui	Toyota Gazoo Racing WRJ	Toyota GR Yaris Rally2	3:40:41.4	+14:12.1	8	0
17	7	30	Fumio Nutahara	Shungo Azuma	Fumio Nutahara	Toyota GR Yaris Rally2	3:44:46.3	+18:17.0	6	0
19	8	26	Andrea Lafarja	Andrés Blanco	Andrea Lafarja	Toyota GR Yaris Rally2	4:00:35.3	+34:06.0	4	0
20	9	32	Satoshi Imai	Yuki Ogawa	Satoshi Imai	Citroën C3 Rally2	4:01:56.2	+35:26.9	2	0
24	10	31	Osamu Fukunaga	Misako Saida	Osamu Fukunaga	Škoda Fabia RS Rally2	4:10:01.6	+43:32.3	1	0
Retired SS10		24	Diego Domínguez Jr.	Rogelio Peñate	Diego Domínguez Jr.	Toyota GR Yaris Rally2	Accident		0	0

==== Special stages ====
Overall
Stage	Winners	Car	Time	Class leaders
SD	Gryazin / Aleksandrov	Lancia Ypsilon Rally2 HF Integrale	2:00.8	—N/a
SS1	Cachón / Rozada	Toyota GR Yaris Rally2	7:45.0	Cachón / Rozada
SS2	Gryazin / Aleksandrov	Lancia Ypsilon Rally2 HF Integrale	19:49.1	Gryazin / Aleksandrov
SS3	Cachón / Rozada	Toyota GR Yaris Rally2	11:08.0	Gryazin / Aleksandrov
SS4	Cachón / Rozada	Toyota GR Yaris Rally2	7:34.4	Cachón / Rozada
SS5	Gryazin / Aleksandrov	Lancia Ypsilon Rally2 HF Integrale	19:09.0	Gryazin / Aleksandrov
SS6	Cachón / Rozada	Toyota GR Yaris Rally2	10:48.9	Cachón / Rozada
SS7	Gryazin / Aleksandrov	Lancia Ypsilon Rally2 HF Integrale	10:33.0	Cachón / Rozada
SS8	Gryazin / Aleksandrov	Lancia Ypsilon Rally2 HF Integrale	15:41.1	Gryazin / Aleksandrov
SS9	Gryazin / Aleksandrov	Lancia Ypsilon Rally2 HF Integrale	13:10.1	Gryazin / Aleksandrov
SS10	Gryazin / Aleksandrov	Lancia Ypsilon Rally2 HF Integrale	13:06.8	Gryazin / Aleksandrov
SS11	Cachón / Rozada	Toyota GR Yaris Rally2	15:42.2	Gryazin / Aleksandrov
SS12	Cachón / Rozada	Toyota GR Yaris Rally2	10:30.1	Gryazin / Aleksandrov
SS13	Lindholm / Morales	Škoda Fabia RS Rally2	1:56.9	Gryazin / Aleksandrov
SS14	Cachón / Rozada	Toyota GR Yaris Rally2	1:55.2	Gryazin / Aleksandrov
SS14	Lindholm / Morales	Škoda Fabia RS Rally2	1:55.2	Gryazin / Aleksandrov
SS15	Cachón / Rozada	Toyota GR Yaris Rally2	12:32.8	Gryazin / Aleksandrov
SS16	Gryazin / Aleksandrov	Lancia Ypsilon Rally2 HF Integrale	9:04.6	Gryazin / Aleksandrov
SS17	Gryazin / Aleksandrov	Lancia Ypsilon Rally2 HF Integrale	2:00.0	Gryazin / Aleksandrov
SS17	Cachón / Rozada	Toyota GR Yaris Rally2	2:00.0	Gryazin / Aleksandrov
SS18	Gryazin / Aleksandrov	Lancia Ypsilon Rally2 HF Integrale	1:59.2	Gryazin / Aleksandrov
SS19	Cachón / Rozada	Toyota GR Yaris Rally2	12:24.9	Gryazin / Aleksandrov
SS20	Gryazin / Aleksandrov	Lancia Ypsilon Rally2 HF Integrale	9:00.1	Gryazin / Aleksandrov

Challenger
Stage	Winners	Car	Time	Class leaders
SD	Gryazin / Aleksandrov	Lancia Ypsilon Rally2 HF Integrale	2:00.8	—N/a
SS1	Cachón / Rozada	Toyota GR Yaris Rally2	7:45.0	Cachón / Rozada
SS2	Gryazin / Aleksandrov	Lancia Ypsilon Rally2 HF Integrale	19:49.1	Gryazin / Aleksandrov
SS3	Cachón / Rozada	Toyota GR Yaris Rally2	11:08.0	Gryazin / Aleksandrov
SS4	Cachón / Rozada	Toyota GR Yaris Rally2	7:34.4	Cachón / Rozada
SS5	Gryazin / Aleksandrov	Lancia Ypsilon Rally2 HF Integrale	19:09.0	Gryazin / Aleksandrov
SS6	Cachón / Rozada	Toyota GR Yaris Rally2	10:48.9	Cachón / Rozada
SS7	Gryazin / Aleksandrov	Lancia Ypsilon Rally2 HF Integrale	10:33.0	Cachón / Rozada
SS8	Gryazin / Aleksandrov	Lancia Ypsilon Rally2 HF Integrale	15:41.1	Gryazin / Aleksandrov
SS9	Gryazin / Aleksandrov	Lancia Ypsilon Rally2 HF Integrale	13:10.1	Gryazin / Aleksandrov
SS10	Gryazin / Aleksandrov	Lancia Ypsilon Rally2 HF Integrale	13:06.8	Gryazin / Aleksandrov
SS11	Cachón / Rozada	Toyota GR Yaris Rally2	15:42.2	Gryazin / Aleksandrov
SS12	Cachón / Rozada	Toyota GR Yaris Rally2	10:30.1	Gryazin / Aleksandrov
SS13	Lindholm / Morales	Škoda Fabia RS Rally2	1:56.9	Gryazin / Aleksandrov
SS14	Cachón / Rozada	Toyota GR Yaris Rally2	1:55.2	Gryazin / Aleksandrov
SS15	Cachón / Rozada	Toyota GR Yaris Rally2	12:32.8	Gryazin / Aleksandrov
SS16	Gryazin / Aleksandrov	Lancia Ypsilon Rally2 HF Integrale	9:04.6	Gryazin / Aleksandrov
SS17	Gryazin / Aleksandrov	Lancia Ypsilon Rally2 HF Integrale	2:00.0	Gryazin / Aleksandrov
SS17	Cachón / Rozada	Toyota GR Yaris Rally2	2:00.0	Gryazin / Aleksandrov
SS18	Gryazin / Aleksandrov	Lancia Ypsilon Rally2 HF Integrale	1:59.2	Gryazin / Aleksandrov
SS19	Cachón / Rozada	Toyota GR Yaris Rally2	12:24.9	Gryazin / Aleksandrov
SS20	Gryazin / Aleksandrov	Lancia Ypsilon Rally2 HF Integrale	9:00.1	Gryazin / Aleksandrov

==== Championship standings ====
Drivers' Standings
Move	Pos.	Driver	Points
6	1	Nikolay Gryazin	56
1	2	Yohan Rossel	52
1	3	Léo Rossel	52
1	4	Roope Korhonen	52
3	5	Alejandro Cachón	46

Co-drivers' Standings
Move	Pos.	Driver	Points
6	1	Konstantin Aleksandrov	56
1	2	Arnaud Dunand	52
1	3	Guillaume Mercoiret	52
1	4	Anssi Viinikka	52
3	5	Borja Rozada	46

Manufacturers' Standings
Move	Pos.	Driver	Points
	1	Lancia Corse HF	163
	2	Toksport WRT	126
	3	M-Sport Ford WRT	45

Challenger Drivers' Standings
Move	Pos.	Driver	Points
	1	Léo Rossel	65
3	2	Nikolay Gryazin	64
1	3	Roope Korhonen	62
	4	Alejandro Cachón	57
2	5	Roberto Daprà	46

Challenger Co-drivers' Standings
Move	Pos.	Driver	Points
	1	Guillaume Mercoiret	67
2	2	Konstantin Aleksandrov	67
1	3	Anssi Viinikka	65
1	4	Luca Guglielmetti	56
	5	Marcelo Der Ohannesian	32

=== WRC3 Rally3 ===
==== Classification ====
Position		No.	Driver	Co-driver	Entrant	Car	Time	Difference	Points
Event	Class	No.	Driver	Co-driver	Entrant	Car	Time	Difference	Points
18	1	35	Ghjuvanni Rossi	Kylian Sarmezan	Ghjuvanni Rossi	Ford Fiesta Rally3	3:45:52.5	0.0	25
22	2	36	Nicolas Otto Boehringer	Hugo Magalhães	Nicolas Otto Boehringer	Ford Fiesta Rally3	4:08:20.9	+22:28.4	17
Retired SS17		34	Georgios Vasilakis	Allan Harryman	Georgios Vasilakis	Ford Fiesta Rally3	Accident		0

==== Special stages ====
Stage	Winners	Car	Time	Class leaders
SD	Otto Boehringer / Magalhães	Ford Fiesta Rally3	2:06.2	—N/a
SS1	Otto Boehringer / Magalhães	Ford Fiesta Rally3	8:33.2	Otto Boehringer / Magalhães
SS2	Rossi / Sarmezan	Ford Fiesta Rally3	21:39.1	Rossi / Sarmezan
SS3	Otto Boehringer / Magalhães	Ford Fiesta Rally3	12:14.9	Rossi / Sarmezan
SS4	Rossi / Sarmezan	Ford Fiesta Rally3	8:15.9	Rossi / Sarmezan
SS5	Rossi / Sarmezan	Ford Fiesta Rally3	20:42.7	Rossi / Sarmezan
SS6	Rossi / Sarmezan	Ford Fiesta Rally3	11:48.8	Rossi / Sarmezan
SS7	Rossi / Sarmezan	Ford Fiesta Rally3	11:33.8	Rossi / Sarmezan
SS8	Rossi / Sarmezan	Ford Fiesta Rally3	17:17.8	Rossi / Sarmezan
SS9	Rossi / Sarmezan	Ford Fiesta Rally3	14:31.0	Rossi / Sarmezan
SS10	Rossi / Sarmezan	Ford Fiesta Rally3	14:26.0	Rossi / Sarmezan
SS11	Rossi / Sarmezan	Ford Fiesta Rally3	17:08.3	Rossi / Sarmezan
SS12	Rossi / Sarmezan	Ford Fiesta Rally3	11:34.3	Rossi / Sarmezan
SS13	Rossi / Sarmezan	Ford Fiesta Rally3	2:06.4	Rossi / Sarmezan
SS14	Rossi / Sarmezan	Ford Fiesta Rally3	2:05.8	Rossi / Sarmezan
SS15	Rossi / Sarmezan	Ford Fiesta Rally3	13:55.7	Rossi / Sarmezan
SS16	Rossi / Sarmezan	Ford Fiesta Rally3	9:52.3	Rossi / Sarmezan
SS17	Rossi / Sarmezan	Ford Fiesta Rally3	2:10.1	Rossi / Sarmezan
SS18	Rossi / Sarmezan	Ford Fiesta Rally3	2:11.9	Rossi / Sarmezan
SS19	Rossi / Sarmezan	Ford Fiesta Rally3	13:49.7	Rossi / Sarmezan
SS20	Rossi / Sarmezan	Ford Fiesta Rally3	9:48.7	Rossi / Sarmezan

==== Championship standings ====
Drivers' Standings
Move	Pos.	Driver	Points
	1	Matteo Fontana	75
	2	Gil Membrado	66
5	3	Ghjuvanni Rossi	55
1	4	Ali Türkkan	46
1	5	Raúl Hernández	45

Co-drivers' Standings
Move	Pos.	Driver	Points
	1	Alessandro Arnaboldi	75
	2	Adrián Pérez	66
5	3	Kylian Sarmezan	55
1	4	Oytun Albayrak	46
1	5	José Murado	45

Previous rally: 2026 Rally de Portugal	2026 FIA World Rally Championship	Next rally: 2026 Acropolis Rally
Previous rally: 2025 Rally Japan	2026 Rally Japan	Next rally: 2027 Rally Japan
