= 2026 Junior WRC Championship =

Motorsport championship

The 2026 FIA Junior WRC Championship was the thirteenth season of Junior WRC, a rallying championship governed by the Fédération Internationale de l'Automobile, running in support of the World Rally Championship. The championship featured five events, beginning in February at the Rally Sweden and concluding in September at the Rally Chile.

== Calendar ==
A map showing the locations of the rallies in the 2026 Junior WRC Championship. Click on the dot to see the rally details.

Round	Start date	Finish date	Rally	Rally headquarters	Surface	Stages	Distance	Ref.
1	12 February	15 February	Rally Sweden	Umeå, Västerbotten County, Sweden	Snow	18	300.10 km	
2	9 April	12 April	Croatia Rally	Rijeka, Croatia	Tarmac	20	300.28 km	
3	7 May	10 May	Rally de Portugal	Matosinhos, Porto, Portugal	Gravel	23	348.70 km	
4	30 July	2 August	Rally Finland	Jyväskylä, Central Finland, Finland	Gravel	20	316.60 km	
5	10 September	13 September	Rally Chile	Concepción, Biobío, Chile	Gravel	16	311.70 km	

== Entrants ==
The following crews are set to enter the 2026 Junior WRC Championship:

Car	Entrant	Driver name	Co-driver name	Rounds
Ford Fiesta Rally3	(Turkey) Castrol Ford Team Türkiye	(Turkey) Ali Türkkan	(Turkey) Oytun Albayrak	1–3
Ford Fiesta Rally3	(Turkey) Castrol Ford Team Türkiye	(Turkey) Ali Türkkan	(Turkey) Bilge Ayan	4–5
Ford Fiesta Rally3	(Republic of Ireland) Motorsport Ireland Rally Academy	(Republic of Ireland) Craig Rahill	(Republic of Ireland) Conor Smith	All
Ford Fiesta Rally3	(Turkey) Team Petrol Ofisi	(Turkey) Kerem Kazaz	(France) Corentin Silvestre	All
Ford Fiesta Rally3	Entered under driver's name	(Sweden) Calle Carlberg	(Norway) Jørgen Eriksen	All
Ford Fiesta Rally3	Entered under driver's name	(Finland) Leevi Lassila	(Finland) Mikko Lukka	All
Ford Fiesta Rally3	Entered under driver's name	(Spain) Gil Membrado	(Spain) Adrián Pérez	All
Ford Fiesta Rally3	Entered under driver's name	(Spain) Raúl Hernández	(Spain) José Murado	1–3

== Results and standings ==
=== Season summary ===
Round	Event	Winning driver	Winning co-driver	Winning time	Report	Ref.
1	Rally Sweden	(Sweden) Calle Carlberg	(Norway) Jørgen Eriksen	2:54:58.1	Report	
2	Croatia Rally	(Turkey) Ali Türkkan	(Turkey) Oytun Albayrak	3:07:01.1	Report	
3	Rally de Portugal	(Turkey) Ali Türkkan	(Turkey) Oytun Albayrak	4:24:45.4	Report	
4	Rally Finland	(Spain) Gil Membrado	(Spain) Adrián Pérez	2:48:29.0	Report	
5	Rally Chile	(Finland) Leevi Lassila	(Finland) Mikko Lukka	3:17:54.6	Report	

=== Scoring system ===
Points are awarded to the top ten classified finishers. An additional point is given for every stage win during a rally. Double points for the final round.

Position	1st	2nd	3rd	4th	5th	6th	7th	8th	9th	10th
Points	25	17	15	12	10	8	6	4	2	1

=== FIA Junior WRC Championship for Drivers ===
Pos.	Driver	SWE (Sweden)	CRO (Croatia)	POR (Portugal)	FIN (Finland)	CHL (Chile)	Total points
1	(Turkey) Ali Türkkan	5^{4}	1^{4}	1^{6}	5^{8}	2^{4}	130
2	(Finland) Leevi Lassila	2^{1}	7	2	2^{3}	1^{2}	113
3	(Spain) Gil Membrado	4	4	3^{5}	1^{2}	4^{5}	100
4	(Sweden) Calle Carlberg	1^{12}	2^{14}	Ret^{8}	3^{4}	Ret^{3}	98
5	(Republic of Ireland) Craig Rahill	Ret	3^{2}	5	Ret	3^{1}	58
6	(Spain) Raúl Hernández	3	6	4^{1}			36
7	(Turkey) Kerem Kazaz	6	5	Ret^{1}	4^{1}	Ret	32
Pos.	Driver	SWE (Sweden)	CRO (Croatia)	POR (Portugal)	FIN (Finland)	CHL (Chile)	Total points

Key
Colour	Result
Gold	Winner
Silver	2nd place
Bronze	3rd place
Green	Points finish
Blue	Non-points finish
Blue	Non-classified finish (NC)
Purple	Did not finish (Ret)
Black	Excluded (EX)
Black	Disqualified (DSQ)
White	Did not start (DNS)
White	Cancelled (C)
Blank	Withdrew entry from the event (WD)

Notes:
Superscripts indicate the number of bonus points that drivers received for winning stages during each rally.

=== FIA Junior WRC Championship for Co-Drivers ===
Pos.	Co-driver	SWE (Sweden)	CRO (Croatia)	POR (Portugal)	FIN (Finland)	CHL (Chile)	Total points
1	(Finland) Mikko Lukka	2^{1}	7	2	2^{3}	1^{2}	113
2	(Spain) Adrián Pérez	4	4	3^{5}	1^{2}	4^{5}	100
3	(Norway) Jørgen Eriksen	1^{12}	2^{14}	Ret^{8}	3^{4}	Ret^{3}	98
4	(Turkey) Oytun Albayrak	5^{4}	1^{4}	1^{6}			74
5	(Republic of Ireland) Conor Smith	Ret	3^{2}	5	Ret	3^{1}	58
6	(Turkey) Bilge Ayan				5^{8}	2^{4}	56
7	(Spain) José Murado	3	6	4^{1}			36
8	(France) Corentin Silvestre	6	5	Ret^{1}	4^{1}	Ret	32
Pos.	Co-driver	SWE (Sweden)	CRO (Croatia)	POR (Portugal)	FIN (Finland)	CHL (Chile)	Total points

Key
Colour	Result
Gold	Winner
Silver	2nd place
Bronze	3rd place
Green	Points finish
Blue	Non-points finish
Blue	Non-classified finish (NC)
Purple	Did not finish (Ret)
Black	Excluded (EX)
Black	Disqualified (DSQ)
White	Did not start (DNS)
White	Cancelled (C)
Blank	Withdrew entry from the event (WD)

Notes:
Superscripts indicate the number of bonus points that drivers received for winning stages during each rally.
