= Alejandro Cachón =

Spanish rally driver

Personal information
- Nationality: (Spain) Spanish
- Born: 28 January 1999 (age 27)

World Rally Championship record
- Years active: 2022–2023, 2025–present
- Co-driver: (Spain) Alejandro López (Spain) Borja Rozada
- Rallies: 16
- Championships: 0
- Rally wins: 0
- Podiums: 0
- Stage wins: 0
- Total points: 13
- First rally: 2022 Ypres Rally
- Last rally: 2026 Croatia Rally

Alejandro Cachón (born 28 January 1999) is a Spanish rally driver.

== Biography ==
Cachón started his rally career in 2017, competing in Asturias. He won the Supercampeonato de España de Rally championship in 2024. At the 2025 Rally Islas Canarias, he scored his first WRC points.

== Rally results ==
=== WRC results ===
Year	Entrant	Car	1	2	3	4	5	6	7	8	9	10	11	12	13	14	Pos.	Points
2022	Citroën Rally Team	Citroën C3 Rally2	MON	SWE	CRO	POR	ITA	KEN	EST	FIN	BEL; 57	GRE	NZL	ESP	JPN		NC	0
2023	Alejandro Cachón	Citroën C3 Rally2	MON; 20	SWE	MEX	CRO; 43	POR; 18	ITA; Ret	KEN	EST	FIN	GRE; 19	CHL	EUR; 34	JPN		NC	0
2025	Toyota España	Toyota GR Yaris Rally2	MON	SWE	KEN	ESP; 9	POR; Ret	ITA; 28	GRE; 10	EST	FIN	PAR	CHL	EUR; Ret	JPN; 8	SAU; Ret	17th	7
2026	Toyota España	Toyota GR Yaris Rally2	MON	SWE; 37	KEN	CRO; 7	ESP; 10	POR; Ret	JPN; 11	GRE; 11	EST	FIN	PAR; Ret	CHL; Ret	ITA	SAU; C	21st	7

* Season still in progress.

=== WRC-2 results ===
Year	Entrant	Car	1	2	3	4	5	6	7	8	9	10	11	12	13	14	Pos.	Points
2022	Citroën Rally Team	Citroën C3 Rally2	MON	SWE	CRO	POR	ITA	KEN	EST	FIN	BEL	GRE	NZL	ESP; 24	JPN		61st	1
2023	Alejandro Cachón	Citroën C3 Rally2	MON; 11	SWE	MEX	CRO; 15	POR; 13	ITA; Ret	KEN	EST; WD	FIN	GRE; 10	CHL	EUR; 16	JPN		47th	1
2025	Toyota España	Toyota GR Yaris Rally2	MON	SWE	KEN	ESP; 2	POR; Ret	ITA; 14	GRE; 5	EST	FIN	PAR	CHL	EUR; Ret	JPN; 1	SAU; Ret	10th	52
2026	Toyota España	Toyota GR Yaris Rally2	MON	SWE; NC	KEN	CRO; 4	ESP; 2	POR; Ret	JPN; 2	GRE; 3	EST	FIN	PAR; Ret	CHL; Ret	ITA	SAU; C	8th	61

* Season still in progress.

=== ERC results ===
Year	Entrant	Car	1	2	3	4	5	6	7	8	Pos.	Points
2021	Rally Team Spain	Peugeot 208 Rally4	POL; Ret	LAT	ITA; 32	CZE; Ret	PRT1	PRT2	HUN; 14	ESP	60th	2
2024	Toyota España	Toyota GR Yaris Rally2	HUN	ESP; 3	SWE	EST	ITA	CZE	GBR	SIL	20th	26
