= Lancia Ypsilon Rally2 HF Integrale =

Lancia Rally2 rally car

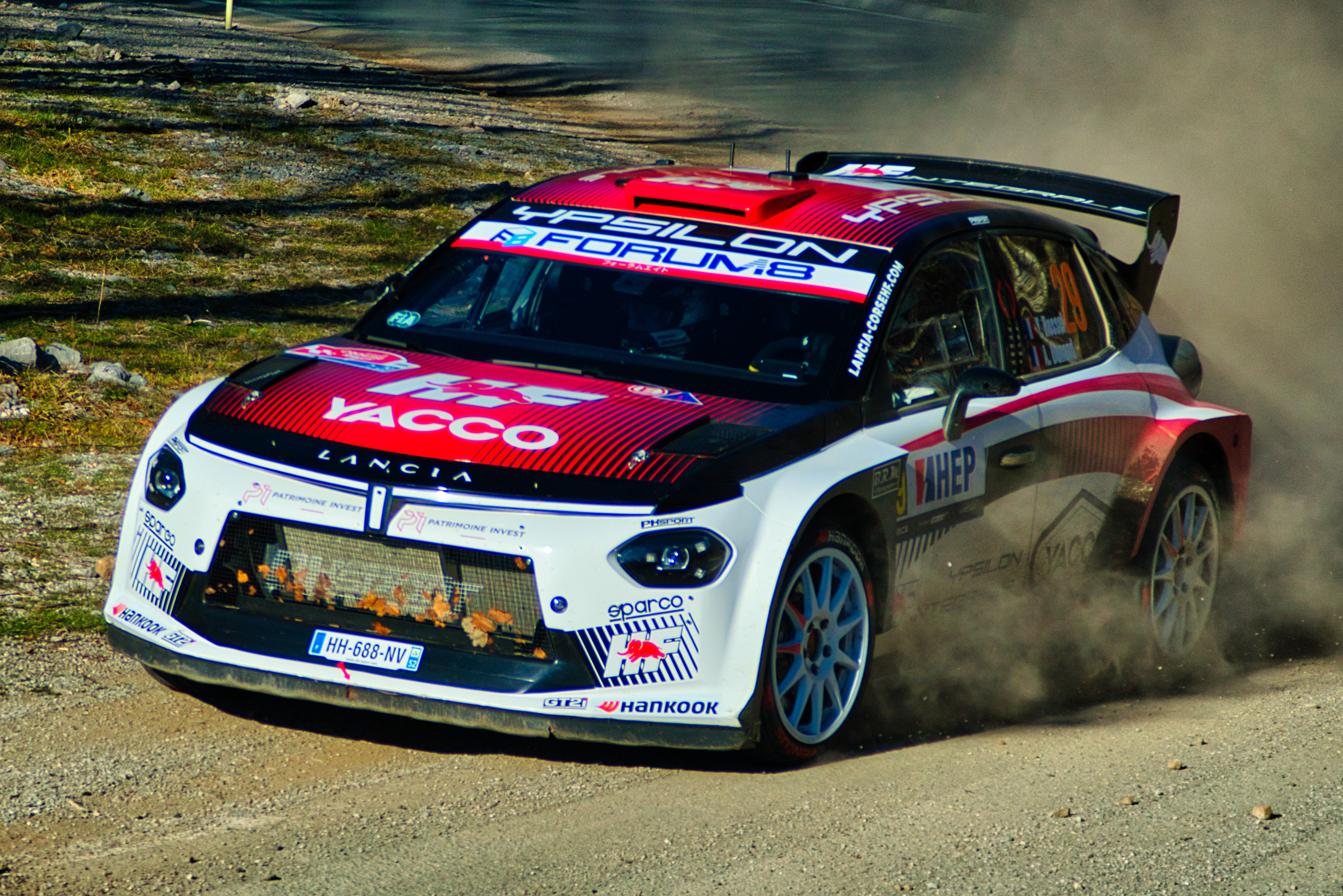
- Yohan Rossel's Ypsilon Rally2 HF Integrale at the 2026 Croatia Rally
- Category: Rally2
- Constructor: Lancia
- Designers: Eugenio Franzetti (Director, Lancia Corse HF)
- Predecessor: Citroën C3 Rally2 (for many official and private teams)

Technical specifications
- Engine: 1,598 cc (97.5 cu in) Straight-four engine turbocharged
- Transmission: five-speed sequential 4-wheel drive
- Power: 287 hp (214 kW; 291 PS)
- Weight: 1,230 kg (2,712 lb)

Competition history
- Competition: World Rally Championship 2
- Notable entrants: Lancia Corse HF
- Notable drivers: (France) Yohan Rossel (Bulgaria) Nikolay Gryazin
- Debut: 2026 Monte Carlo Rally
- First win: 2026 Croatia Rally
- Last win: 2026 Rally Chile
Races	Wins	Podiums
7	4	6
- Teams' Championships: 1 (Lancia Corse HF in 2026)

The Lancia Ypsilon Rally2 HF Integrale is a rally car developed and built by Lancia to FIA's Group Rally2 regulations. It is based upon the Lancia Ypsilon road car and debuted at the 2026 Monte Carlo Rally for the 2026 WRC2 Championship.

== Development history ==
The Rally2 version of the car is powered by a 1.6-litre turbocharged petrol engine. It features an upgraded version of engine and gearbox utilised by the Citroën C3 Rally2 car.

The car was in development in 2025 and was unveiled during testing in August and September 2025 by Stellantis.

On 27 February 2026, Stellantis has announced that Italian driver Andrea Crugnola, multiple Italian rally champion, will participate in the 2026 Italian Rally Championship with the Lancia Ypsilon Rally2 HF Integrale, which he helped develop.

== Competition history ==
=== FIA WRC2 Championship ===
The car has been announced as the competition car to contest the 2026 WRC2 Championship under the name of Lancia Corse HF, with operation by PH Sport. This would mark Lancia's comeback to the World Rally Championship after decades. Two factory-backed entries would be entered into the championship and is set to be debuted at the 2026 Monte Carlo Rally. Yohan Rossel and Nikolay Gryazin are under contract to drive the car for the team. The Lancia Ypsilon Rally2 HF Integrale competed as scheduled in the 2026 Monte Carlo Rally, a rally considered this year, one of the most challenging edition due to environmental and weather conditions. Despite some minor errors by drivers from both teams, the car proved to be fast and competitive. The Lancia Ypsilon Rally2 HF Integrale won eight Special Stages and the Shakedown Special. Nikolay Gryazin won SD and SS1, which were the two stages of the season, while Yohan Rossel won SS6, SS10, SS11, SS14, SS15, SS16, and the final SS17. On 12 April 2026, the Lancia Ypsilon Rally2 HF Integrale achieved its first victory in the World Rally Championship 2, in the 2026 Croatia Rally, won by driver Yohan Rossel and co-driver Arnaud Dunand. Lancia Ypsilon Rally2 HF finished 4th, with Yohan Rossel - Arnaud Dunand and 6th, Nikolay Gryazin - Konstantin Aleksandrov in the 2026 Croatia Rally, behind only the Rally1 cars, confirming its quality as a fast, precise and reliable car. This rally victory for Lancia marks Lancia's return to victory in the World Rally Championship after 34 years.

=== WRC2 victories ===
Year	No.	Event	Surface	Driver	Co-driver
2026	1	2026 Croatia Rally	Tarmac	(France) Yohan Rossel	(France) Arnaud Dunand
2026	2	(Spain) 2026 Rally Islas Canarias	Tarmac	(France) Yohan Rossel	(France) Arnaud Dunand
2026	3	2026 Rally Japan	Tarmac	(Bulgaria) Nikolay Gryazin	(Kyrgyzstan) Konstantin Aleksandrov
2026	4	2026 Rally Chile	Gravel	(France) Yohan Rossel	(France) Arnaud Dunand

=== FIA European Rally Championship ===
The car also competes in the 2026 European Rally Championship with Lancia Corse HF composed of the driver Andrea Mabellini and co-driver Virginia Lenzi. Furthermore, the car also competes with the Finnish team, Rautio Motorsport composed of driver Tuukka Kauppinen and co-driver Topi Luhtinen. On 19 April 2026, in the first rally round of the European championship, the 43rd Andalucía Rally - Sierra Morena - Córdoba World Heritage Site 2026, the Lancia Ypsilon Rally2 HF Integrale of driver Mabellini and co-driver Lenzi took sixth place, +51.6 from the winner.

=== Italian Rally Championship ===
The car competes in the 2026 Italian Rally Championship with the E.A. Sport Investment team, composed of driver Andrea Crugnola and co-driver Luca Beltrame. The car proved to be very fast and competitive and won the first rally of the championship, a first victory for Lancia in the championship that had been missing for over 30 years. Lancia's last victory, at the Rally Il Ciocco e Valle del Serchio, was back in 1993, when driver Gilberto Pianezzola and co-driver Loris Roggia won in a Lancia Delta Integrale. Exactly 33 years ago.

==== Rally victories ====
Year	No.	Event	Surface	Driver	Co-driver
2026	1	(Italy) 49° Rally Il Ciocco e Valle del Serchio	Tarmac	(Italy) Andrea Crugnola	(Italy) Luca Beltrame
2026	2	(Italy) 20° Rally Regione Piemonte	Tarmac	(Italy) Andrea Crugnola	(Italy) Luca Beltrame
2026	3	(Italy) 73° Rally Sanremo	Tarmac	(Italy) Fabio Andolfi	(Switzerland) Marco Menchini

=== French Rally Championship ===
The car competes in the 2026 French Rally Championship with the Trajectus Motorsport team, composed of driver Yoann Bonato and co-driver Benjamin Boulloud. The car wins incredibly, as happened for the 2026 Italian Rally Championship with the victory in the first rally, the first rally of the 2026 French Rally Championship. A double victory in the debut in the Italian and French championship that highlights the excellent performance of the car.

==== Rally victories ====
Year	No.	Event	Surface	Driver	Co-driver
2026	1	(France) 66º Rallye Le Touquet Pas-De-Calais	Tarmac	(France) Yoann Bonato	(France) Benjamin Boulloud
2026	2	(France) 41º Rallye Vosges - Grand-Est	Tarmac	(France) Yoann Bonato	(France) Benjamin Boulloud
2026	3	(France) 78º Rallye Mont-Blanc Morzine	Tarmac	(France) Yoann Bonato	(France) Benjamin Boulloud
2026	4	(France) 67º Critérium des Cévennes	Tarmac	(France) Yohan Rossel	(France) Alexis Maillefert

=== Italian Rally victories ===
Rallies that are not part of the 2026 Italian Rally Championship and do not count towards the awarding of the title.

Year	No.	Event	Surface	Driver	Co-driver
2026	1	(Italy) 34º Rally dei Laghi	Tarmac	(Italy) Andrea Crugnola	(Italy) Andrea Sassi
2026	2	(Italy) 49º Rally 1000 Miglia	Tarmac	(Italy) Andrea Crugnola	(Italy) Luca Beltrame
2026	3	(Italy) 45° Trofeo Villa d'Este	Tarmac	(Italy) Fabio Andolfi	(Switzerland) Marco Menchini

=== Rally2 victories ===
Year	No.	Event	Surface	Driver	Co-driver
2026	1	(San Marino) 24º Rallylegend	Tarmac	(Bulgaria) Nikolay Gryazin	(Kyrgyzstan) Konstantin Aleksandrov
