= Shakedown (testing) =

Period of testing of a vehicle

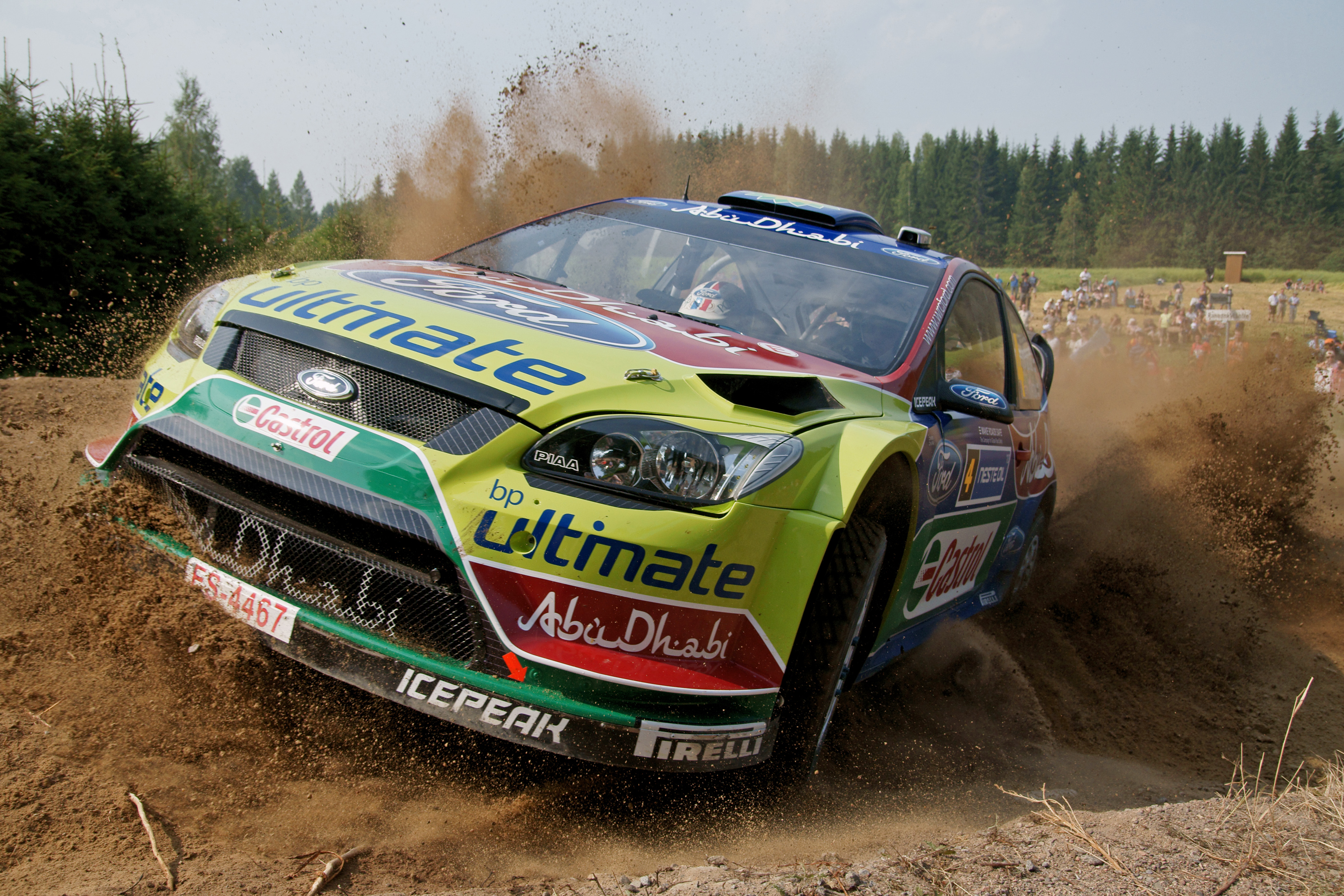
Jari-Matti Latvala, winner of the Neste Oil Rally Finland 2010, driving his car in Muurame shakedown

A shakedown is a period of testing or a trial journey undergone by a ship, aircraft or other craft and its crew before being declared operational. Statistically, a proportion of the components will fail after a relatively short period of use, and those that survive this period can be expected to last for a much longer, and more importantly, predictable life-span. For example, if a bolt has a hidden flaw introduced during manufacturing, it will not be as reliable as other bolts of the same type.

== Example procedures ==
=== Racing cars ===
Most racing cars require a "shakedown" test before being used at a race meeting. For example, on May 3, 2006, Luca Badoer performed shakedowns on all three of Ferrari's Formula One cars at the Fiorano Circuit, in preparation for the European Grand Prix at the Nürburgring. Badoer was the Ferrari F1 team's test driver at the time, while the main drivers were Michael Schumacher and Felipe Massa.

=== Aircraft ===
Aircraft shakedowns check avionics, flight controls, all systems, and the general airframe's airworthiness. In aircraft there are two forms of shakedown testing: shakedown testing of the design as a whole with flight-tests, and shakedown testing of individual aircraft.

Shakedown testing of an aircraft design involves test flights of the prototypes, a process that actually starts months or years before first flight with simulator flights and hardware testing. This process often incorporates an iron bird test rig in which all the flight control systems are brought together in an engineering lab, while test-articles of the physical structure will be subjected to stress and fatigue loads beyond anything the aircraft is likely to encounter in service (sometimes, although not necessarily, testing one or more articles to destruction). The aircraft systems are gradually commissioned on board the prototypes; first on external power, then, once engines are fitted, on internal power, progressing to taxi trials and eventually first flight. Flight-testing proceeds conservatively, demonstrating that each test condition can be safely achieved before proceeding to the next. Prototype aircraft are generally heavily instrumented in order to support these flight-test objectives by capturing large amounts of data for both live analysis (which on larger aircraft such as airliners may happen at dedicated flight-test engineer stations on board) and for analysis post-flight. The ultimate aim of testing is to demonstrate the aircraft can operate safely throughout its flight envelope and that all regulatory requirements of the relevant civil aviation authorities have been met, allowing the design to receive its Certificate of Airworthiness.

Shakedown testing of production aircraft is a simplified version of prototype testing. The design has been demonstrated to be safe and the objective is to now demonstrate that the components on an individual aircraft operate appropriately. Shakedown now comprises the general power-on trials, followed by one or more pre-delivery test flights carried out by the aircraft builder's personnel, and generally culminating in a final acceptance test also involving the purchaser's own flight crew and engineering personnel.

=== Ship ===
A shakedown for a ship is generally referred to as a sea trial. The maiden voyage takes place after a successful shakedown. However, for warships, the shakedown period extends post-commissioning as the new crew familiarise themselves with the ship and with operating together as a single unit, raising their proficiency until the warship can be considered operational.

=== Hiking ===
A shakedown hike is when a backpacker, in preparation for a long hike such as the Appalachian Trail, Pacific Crest Trail or the Continental Divide Trail, takes their selection of equipment on a shorter backpacking trip with the intention of testing its trail worthiness. A related term, the pack shakedown, is when a novice hiker has a more experienced hiker suggest changes to the novice's equipment, often simply suggesting things to leave out.

== See also ==
- Bathtub curve, the engineering concept behind shakedowns
- Demonstration and Shakedown Operation, tests performed by the United States Navy for submarine certification
- Burn-in
