= Alexandre Coria =

French rally co-driver (born 1993)

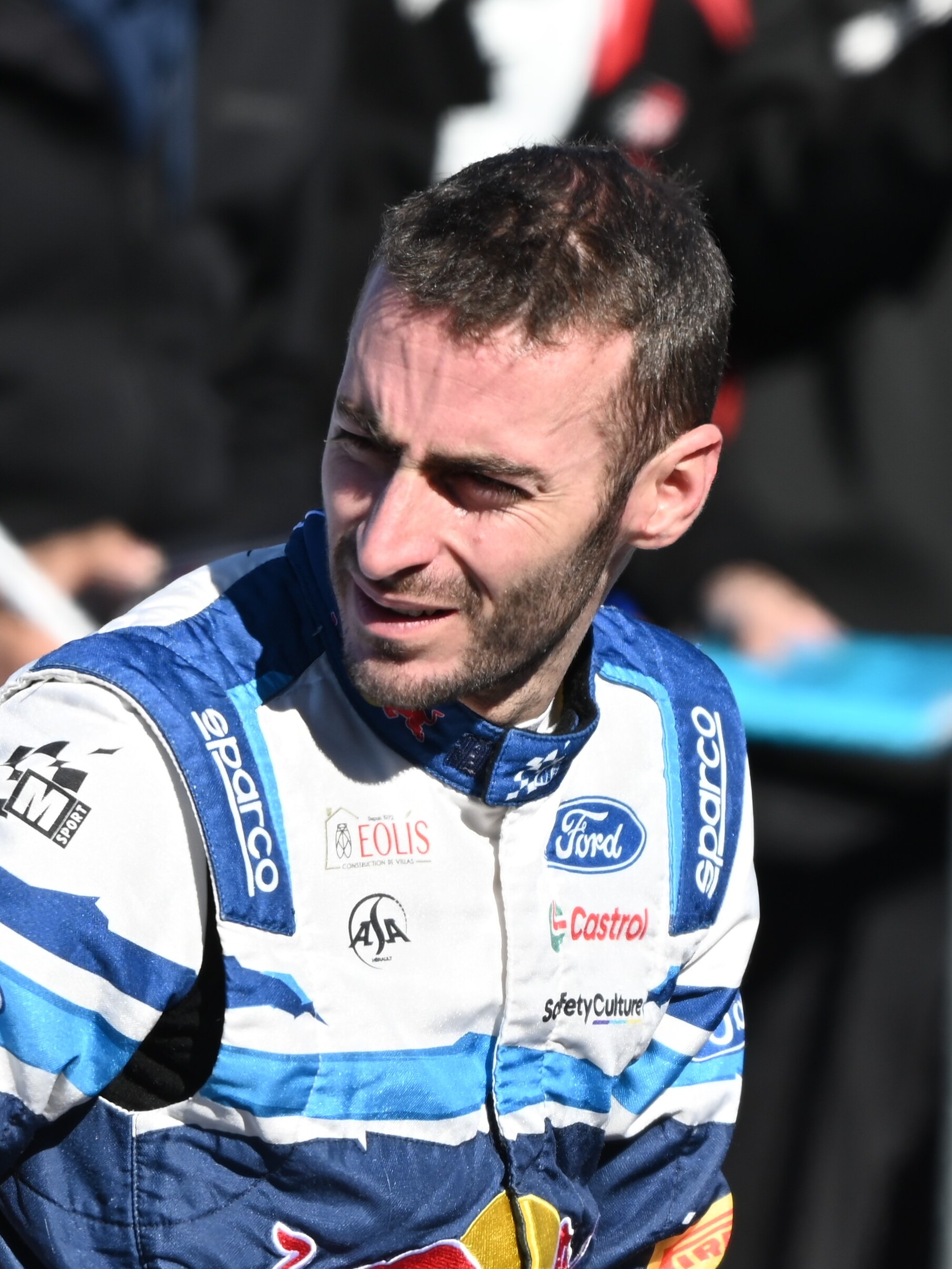
- Alexandre Coria at the 2024 Rally Japan

Personal information
- Nationality: (France) French
- Born: January 22, 1993 (age 33)

World Rally Championship record
- Years active: 2016, 2019, 2021–present
- Driver: (France) Vincent Dubert (France) Emmanuel Guigou (France) Yohan Rossel (France) Adrien Fourmaux
- Teams: M-Sport Ford
- Rallies: 50
- Championships: 0
- Rally wins: 0
- Podiums: 6
- Stage wins: 21
- Total points: 232
- First rally: 2016 Rally de Portugal
- Last rally: 2026 Rally Italia Sardegna

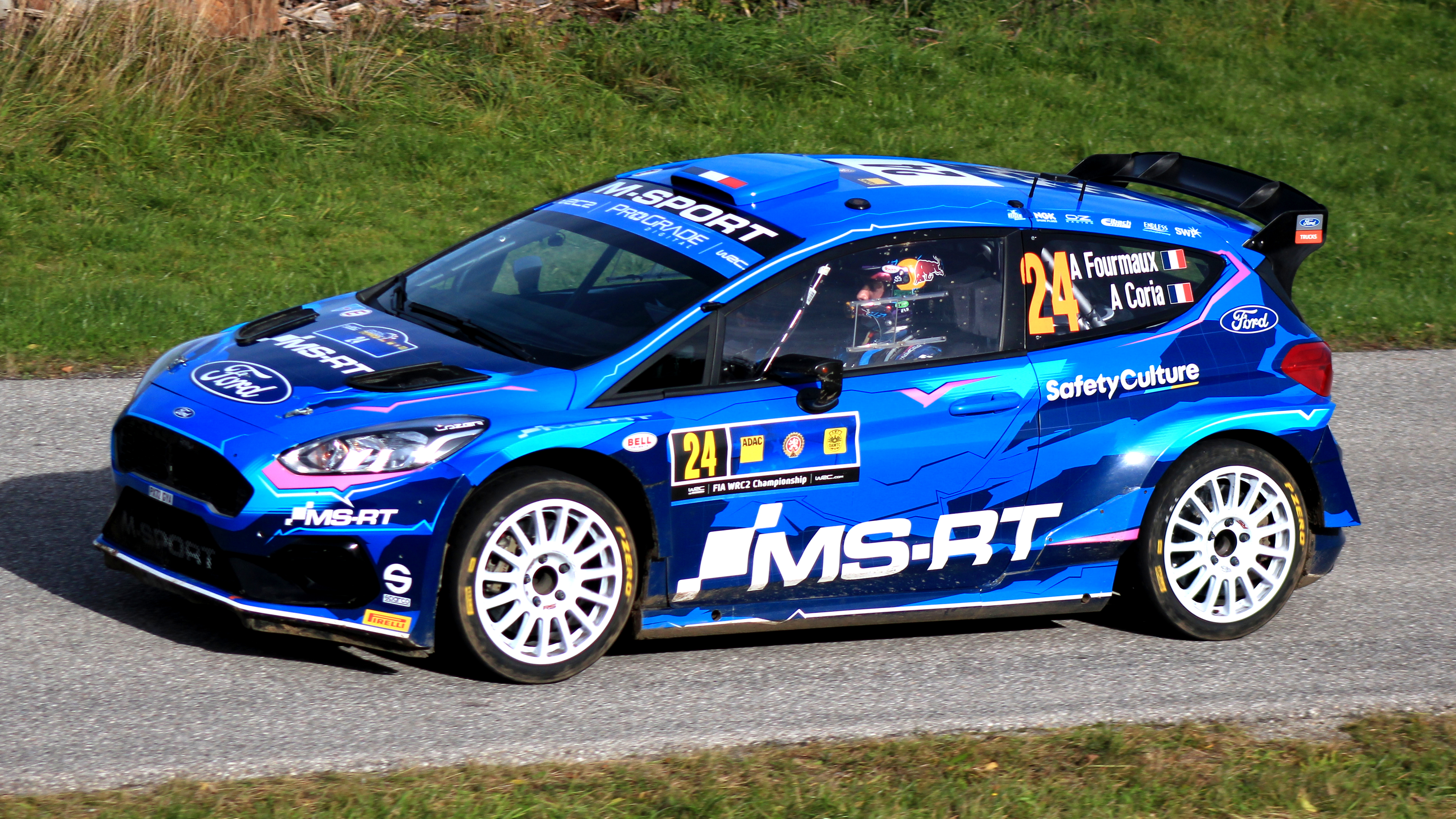
A 2023 Ford Fiesta Rally2 co-driven by Coria.

Alexandre Coria (born 22 January 1993) is a French rally co-driver. He is the co-driver of Adrien Fourmaux for M-Sport Ford in the World Rally Championship.

== Rally results ==
Year	Entrant	Car	1	2	3	4	5	6	7	8	9	10	11	12	13	14	WDC	Points
2016	Vincent Dubert	Citroën DS3 R3T Max	MON	SWE	MEX	ARG	POR; 33	ITA	POL; 27	FIN; 28	GER; 32	CHN; C	FRA; 30	ESP	GBR; 44	AUS	NC	0
2019	Emmanuel Guigou	Renault Clio RS R3T	MON	SWE	MEX	FRA; 18	ARG	CHL	POR	ITA	FIN	GER	TUR	GBR	ESP	AUS; C	NC	0
2021	Emmanuel Guigou	Alpine A110 Rally RGT	MON; 22	ARC													15th	18
2021	Yohan Rossel	Citroën C3 Rally2			CRO; 14	POR; 14	ITA; 7	KEN	EST	BEL; 7	GRE; DSQ						15th	18
2021	M-Sport Ford WRT	Ford Fiesta WRC										FIN; 7	ESP; 16	MNZ; 55			15th	18
2022	M-Sport Ford WRT	Ford Puma Rally1	MON; Ret	SWE; Ret	CRO; Ret	POR; 9	ITA; Ret	KEN; 13	EST; 7	FIN; 18	BEL; Ret	GRE; WD	NZL; WD	ESP; 8	JPN; WD		16th	13
2023	M-Sport Ford WRT	Ford Fiesta Rally2	MON; 13	SWE	MEX; 16	CRO; 12	POR; 15	ITA; Ret	KEN	EST	FIN; 8	GRE; 11	CHL	EUR; 8			20th	8
2023	M-Sport Ford WRT	Ford Puma Rally1													JPN; Ret		20th	8
2024	M-Sport Ford WRT	Ford Puma Rally1	MON; 5	SWE; 3	KEN; 3	CRO; 17	POR; 4	ITA; 14	POL; 3	LAT; 4	FIN; 3	GRE; 21	CHL; 5	EUR; 32	JPN; 3		5th	162
2025	Hyundai Shell Mobis WRT	Hyundai i20 N Rally1	MON; 3	SWE; 40	KEN; 16	ESP; 5	POR; Ret	ITA; 20	GRE; 3	EST; 5	FIN; Ret	PAR; Ret	CHL; 3	EUR; 5	JPN; Ret	SAU; 2	7th	115
2026	Hyundai Shell Mobis WRT	Hyundai i20 N Rally1	MON; 4	SWE; 5	KEN; 2	CRO; 30	ESP; 5	POR; 4	JPN; 5	GRE; 7	EST; 3	FIN; 4	PAR; 3	CHL; 3	ITA; 4		5th	183

* Season still in progress.
