= Jan Černý (rally driver) =

Czech rally driver (born 1990)

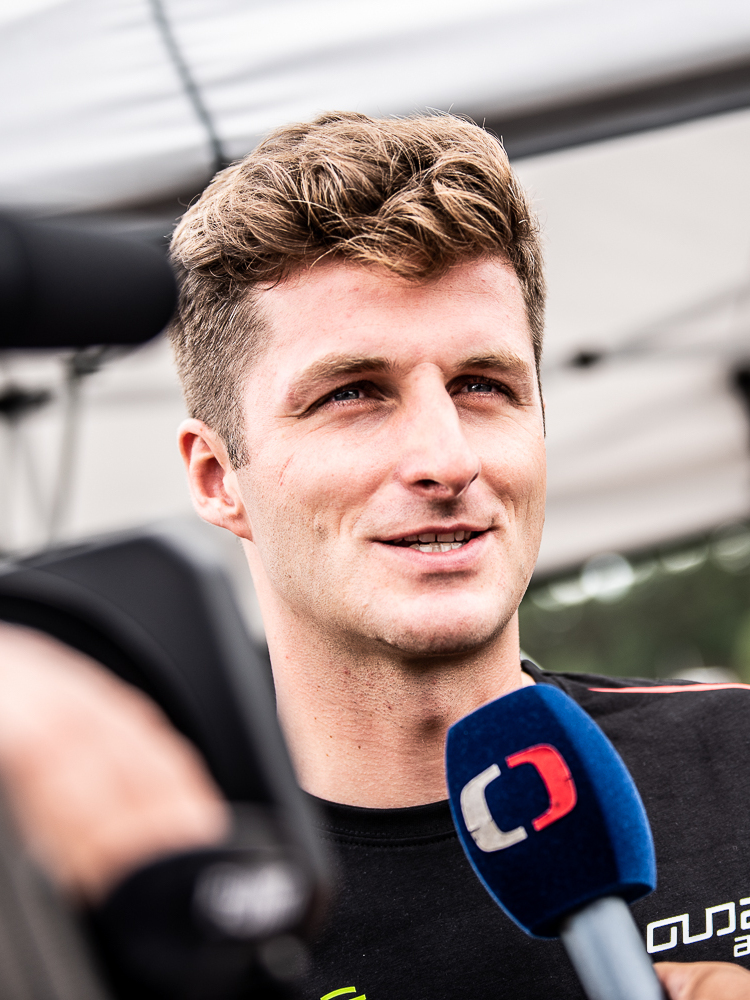
- Černý in 2021

Personal information
- Nationality: (Czech Republic) Czech
- Born: 6 June 1990 (age 36); Příbram, Czechoslovakia

World Rally Championship record
- Years active: 2011, 2014, 2022, 2024–present
- Co-driver: Ondřej Krajča
- Rallies: 21
- Championships: 0
- Rally wins: 0
- Podiums: 0
- Stage wins: 0
- Total points: 0
- First rally: 2014 Rally de Portugal

Jan Černý (born 6 June 1990) is a Czech rally driver.

== Biography ==
Černý made his rally debut in 2006. He made his rallycross debut in 2020, driving a front-wheel-drive Škoda Citigo prepared by Pajr Motorsport.

Černý won the WRC3 category at the 2024 Monte Carlo Rally, ahead of Ghjuvanni Rossi. He stepped up to the WRC2 category in 2025, driving a Citroën C3 Rally2 prepared by LMP Racing. Fellow compatriot Ondřej Krajča would continue to co-drive with him. At the 2025 Central European Rally, he became the winner of the category, scoring his first WRC points as well.

== Rally results ==
=== WRC results ===
Year	Entrant	Car	1	2	3	4	5	6	7	8	9	10	11	12	13	14	WDC	Points
2011	Jan Černý	Ford Fiesta R2	SWE	MEX	POR; Ret	JOR	ITA; NC	ARG	GRE	FIN; NC	GER; NC	AUS	FRA; Ret	ESP	GBR; Ret		NC	0
2014	Jan Černý	Citroën DS3 R3T	MON	SWE	MEX	POR	ARG	ITA	POL; 36	FIN	GER	AUS	FRA	ESP	GBR		NC	0
2022	Jan Černý	Ford Fiesta Rally3	MON; 23	SWE	CRO	POR	ITA; 25	KEN	EST	FIN; 19	BEL; 34	GRE	NZL	ESP; 31	JPN		NC	0
2024	Jan Černý	Ford Fiesta Rally3	MON; 18	SWE; Ret	KEN	CRO	POR; 22	ITA	POL; 31	LAT	FIN	GRE	CHL	EUR; 25	JPN		NC	0
2025	Jan Černý	Citroën C3 Rally2	MON; 13	SWE	KEN	ESP; 18	POR	ITA	GRE	EST	FIN; 22	PAR	CHL	EUR; 9	JPN	SAU	22nd	2

* Season still in progress.
