= 2024 Monte Carlo Rally =

92nd edition of the Monte Carlo Rally

2024 Monte Carlo Rally 92^{e} Rallye Automobile Monte-Carlo
Round 1 of 13 in the 2024 World Rally Championship
Next event →
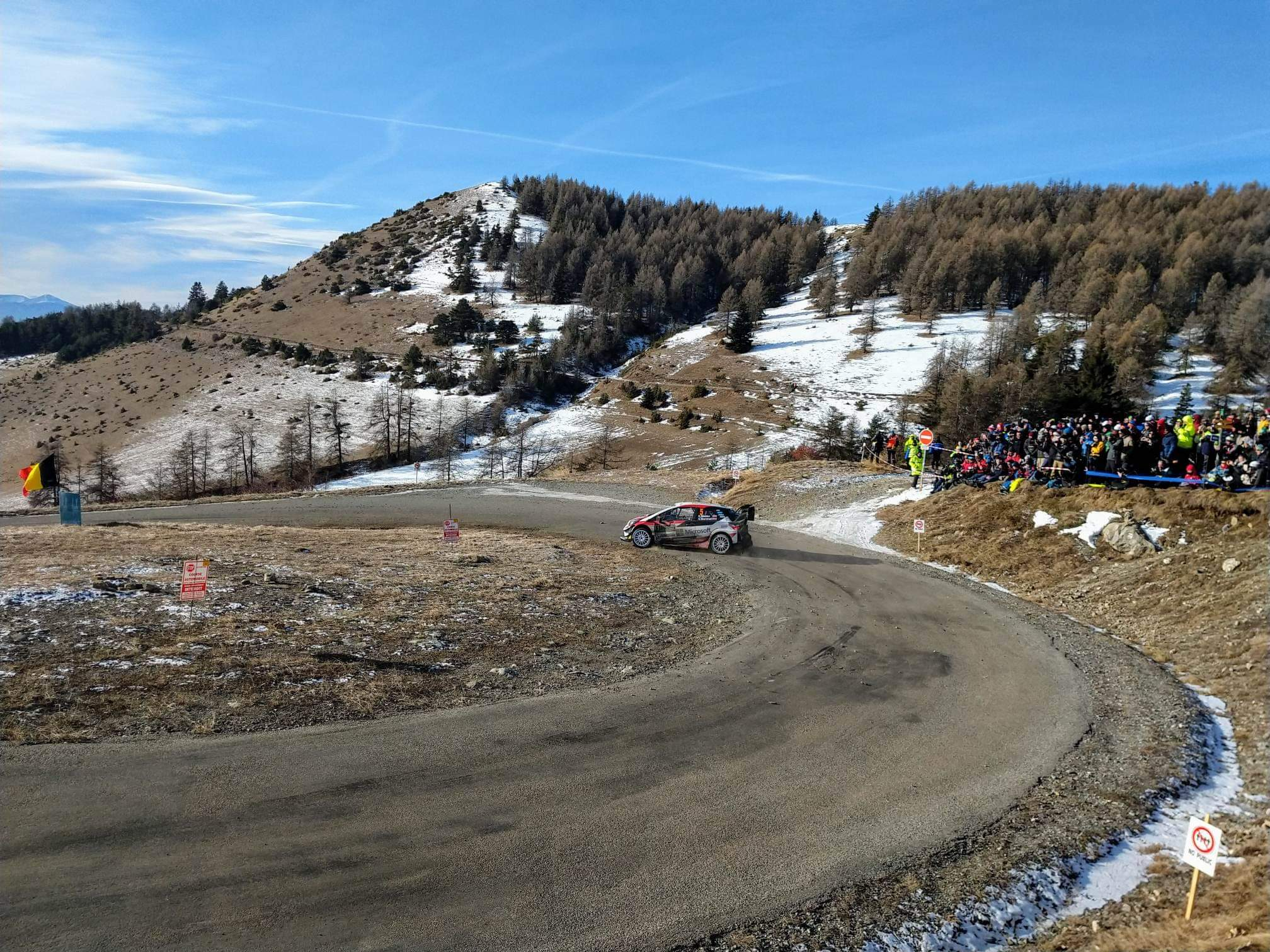
- The Monte Carlo Rally is run on a mixture of tarmac and snow stages.
- Host country: Monaco (Note: Although the rally was run in France, the Fédération Internationale de l'Automobile does not consider France to be the host nation.)
- Rally base: Gap, Provence-Alpes-Côte d'Azur, France
- Dates run: 25 – 28 January 2024
- Start location: Thoard, Provence-Alpes-Côte d'Azur, France
- Finish location: Col de Turini, Alpes-Maritimes, France
- Stages: 17 (324.44 km; 201.60 miles)
- Stage surface: Tarmac and snow
- Transport distance: 1,325.45 km (823.60 miles)
- Overall distance: 1,649.89 km (1,025.19 miles)

Statistics
- Crews registered: 70
- Crews: 68 at start, 64 at finish

Overall results
- Overall winner: (Belgium) Thierry Neuville (Belgium) Martijn Wydaeghe (South Korea) Hyundai Shell Mobis WRT; 3:09:30.9
- Saturday Overall leader: (Belgium) Thierry Neuville (Belgium) Martijn Wydaeghe (South Korea) Hyundai Shell Mobis WRT; 2:37:58.5
- Sunday Accumulated leader: (Belgium) Thierry Neuville (Belgium) Martijn Wydaeghe (South Korea) Hyundai Shell Mobis WRT; 31:32.4
- Power Stage winner: (Belgium) Thierry Neuville (Belgium) Martijn Wydaeghe (South Korea) Hyundai Shell Mobis WRT; 9:50.4

Support category results
- WRC-2 winner: (France) Yohan Rossel (France) Arnaud Dunand (Belgium) DG Sport Compétition; 3:20:00.7
- WRC-3 winner: (Czech Republic) Jan Černý (Czech Republic) Ondřej Krajča; 3:42:09.1

The 2024 Monte Carlo Rally (also known as the 92^{e} Rallye Automobile Monte-Carlo) was a motor racing event for rally cars held over four days from 25 to 28 January 2024. It marked the ninety-second running of the Monte Carlo Rally, and was the first round of the 2024 World Rally Championship, World Rally Championship-2 and World Rally Championship-3. The 2024 event was based in Gap, Provence-Alpes-Côte d'Azur in France and consisted of seventeen special stages, covering a total competitive distance of 324.44 km (201.60 mi).

Sébastien Ogier and Vincent Landais were the defending rally winners, and Toyota Gazoo Racing WRT were the manufacturer's winners. Yohan Rossel and Arnaud Dunand were the defending rally winners in the WRC-2 category.

Thierry Neuville and Martijn Wydaeghe won the rally. Their team, Hyundai Shell Mobis WRT, were the manufacturer's winners. Rossel and Dunand successfully defended their titles in the WRC-2 category. Jan Černý and Ondřej Krajča were the winners in the WRC-3 category.

== Background ==
=== Entry list ===
The following crews entered into the rally. The event was opened to crews competing in the World Rally Championship, its support categories, the World Rally Championship-2 and World Rally Championship-3, and privateer entries that were not registered to score points in any championship. Eight entered under Rally1 regulations, as were twenty-two Rally2 crews in the World Rally Championship-2 and three Rally3 crews in the World Rally Championship-3.

Rally1 entries competing in the World Rally Championship
No.	Driver	Co-Driver	Entrant	Car	Championship eligibility	Tyre
8	(Estonia) Ott Tänak	(Estonia) Martin Järveoja	(South Korea) Hyundai Shell Mobis WRT	Hyundai i20 N Rally1	Driver, Co-driver, Manufacturer	P
9	(Norway) Andreas Mikkelsen	(Norway) Torstein Eriksen	(South Korea) Hyundai Shell Mobis WRT	Hyundai i20 N Rally1	Driver, Co-driver, Manufacturer	P
11	(Belgium) Thierry Neuville	(Belgium) Martijn Wydaeghe	(South Korea) Hyundai Shell Mobis WRT	Hyundai i20 N Rally1	Driver, Co-driver, Manufacturer	P
13	(Luxembourg) Grégoire Munster	(Belgium) Louis Louka	(United Kingdom) M-Sport Ford WRT	Ford Puma Rally1	Driver, Co-driver, Manufacturer	P
16	(France) Adrien Fourmaux	(France) Alexandre Coria	(United Kingdom) M-Sport Ford WRT	Ford Puma Rally1	Driver, Co-driver, Manufacturer	P
17	(France) Sébastien Ogier	(France) Vincent Landais	(Japan) Toyota Gazoo Racing WRT	Toyota GR Yaris Rally1	Driver, Co-driver, Manufacturer	P
18	(Japan) Takamoto Katsuta	(Republic of Ireland) Aaron Johnston	(Japan) Toyota Gazoo Racing WRT	Toyota GR Yaris Rally1	Driver, Co-driver, Manufacturer	P
33	(United Kingdom) Elfyn Evans	(United Kingdom) Scott Martin	(Japan) Toyota Gazoo Racing WRT	Toyota GR Yaris Rally1	Driver, Co-driver, Manufacturer	P

Rally2 entries competing in the World Rally Championship-2
No.	Driver	Co-Driver	Entrant	Car	Championship eligibility	Tyre
20	(France) Yohan Rossel	(France) Arnaud Dunand	(Belgium) DG Sport Compétition	Citroën C3 Rally2	Driver, Co-driver, Team	P
21	(Bulgaria) Nikolay Gryazin	Konstantin Aleksandrov (Note: Konstantin Aleksandrov is Russian, but he competes as a neutral competitor using the ANA flag as Russian national emblems were banned by the association due to the Russian invasion of Ukraine.)	(Belgium) DG Sport Compétition	Citroën C3 Rally2	Challenger Driver, Challenger Co-driver, Team	P
24	(France) Nicolas Ciamin	(France) Yannick Roche	(France) Nicolas Ciamin	Hyundai i20 N Rally2	Challenger Driver, Challenger Co-driver	P
25	(Spain) Pepe López	(Spain) David Vázquez Liste	(Spain) Pepe López	Škoda Fabia RS Rally2	Challenger Driver, Challenger Co-driver	P
26	(United Kingdom) Chris Ingram	(Republic of Ireland) Hannah McKillop	(United Kingdom) Chris Ingram	Škoda Fabia RS Rally2	Challenger Driver, Challenger Co-driver	P
27	(France) Stéphane Lefebvre	(France) Andy Malfoy	(France) Stéphane Lefebvre	Toyota GR Yaris Rally2	Driver, Co-driver	P
28	(France) Bryan Bouffier	(France) Frédéric Vauclare	(France) Bryan Bouffier	Toyota GR Yaris Rally2	Challenger Driver, Challenger Co-driver	P
29	(Spain) Jan Solans	(Spain) Rodrigo Sanjuan de Eusebio	(Spain) Jan Solans	Toyota GR Yaris Rally2	Challenger Driver, Challenger Co-driver	P
30	(Mexico) Alejandro Mauro Sánchez	(Spain) Adrián Pérez Fernández	(Mexico) Alejandro Mauro Sánchez	Škoda Fabia Rally2 evo	Challenger Driver, Challenger Co-driver	P
31	(Belgium) John Wartique	(Belgium) Maxime Andernack	(Belgium) John Wartique	Ford Fiesta Rally2	Challenger Driver, Challenger Co-driver	P
32	(Italy) Mauro Miele	(Italy) Luca Beltrame	(Italy) Mauro Miele	Škoda Fabia RS Rally2	Challenger/Masters Driver, Challenger Co-driver	P
34	(Italy) Roberto Daprà	(Italy) Luca Guglielmetti	(Italy) Roberto Daprà	Škoda Fabia Rally2 evo	Challenger Driver, Challenger Co-driver	P
35	(Switzerland) Olivier Burri	(France) Anderson Levratti	(Switzerland) Olivier Burri	Škoda Fabia Rally2 evo	Challenger Driver, Challenger Co-driver	P
36	(Italy) Jacopo Bergamin	(Italy) Alice Tasselli	(Italy) Jacopo Bergamin	Volkswagen Polo GTI R5	Challenger Driver, Challenger Co-driver	P
37	(Italy) Federico Laurencich	(Italy) Alberto Mlakar	(Italy) Federico Laurencich	Škoda Fabia Rally2 evo	Challenger Driver, Challenger Co-driver	P
38	(Italy) Massimiliano Locatelli	(Italy) Stefano Tiraboschi	(Italy) Massimiliano Locatelli	Škoda Fabia Rally2 evo	Challenger Driver, Challenger Co-driver	P
39	(Republic of Ireland) Eamonn Boland	(Republic of Ireland) Michael Joseph Morrissey	(Republic of Ireland) Eamonn Boland	Ford Fiesta Rally2	Challenger/Masters Driver, Challenger/Masters Co-driver	P
40	(Greece) Jourdan Serderidis	(Belgium) Frédéric Miclotte	(Greece) Jourdan Serderidis	Volkswagen Polo GTI R5	Challenger/Masters Driver, Challenger/Masters Co-driver	P
41	(Italy) Maurizio Morato	(Italy) Massimiliano Bosi	(Italy) Maurizio Morato	Škoda Fabia Rally2 evo	Challenger Driver, Challenger Co-driver	P
43	(Italy) Maurizio Chiarani	(Italy) Flavio Zanella	(Italy) Maurizio Chiarani	Škoda Fabia Rally2 evo	Challenger/Masters Driver, Challenger/Masters Co-driver	P
44	(Italy) Filippo Marchino	(Italy) Pietro Elia Ometto	(Italy) Filippo Marchino	Škoda Fabia Rally2 evo	Challenger Driver, Challenger Co-driver	P
45	(Netherlands) Henk Vossen	(Netherlands) Willem Vissenberg	(Netherlands) Henk Vossen	Hyundai i20 N Rally2	Challenger/Masters Driver, Challenger Co-driver	P

Rally3 entries competing in the World Rally Championship-3
No.	Driver	Co-Driver	Entrant	Car	Tyre
46	(Czech Republic) Jan Černý	(Czech Republic) Ondřej Krajča	(Czech Republic) Jan Černý	Ford Fiesta Rally3	P
47	(France) Ghjuvanni Rossi	(France) Kylian Sarmezan	(France) Ghjuvanni Rossi	Renault Clio Rally3	P
48	(Italy) Carlo Covi	(Italy) Simone Angi	(Italy) Carlo Covi	Ford Fiesta Rally3	P

Other major entries
No.	Driver	Co-Driver	Entrant	Car	Championship eligibility	Tyre
22	(Sweden) Oliver Solberg	(United Kingdom) Elliott Edmondson	(Germany) Toksport WRT	Škoda Fabia RS Rally2	—N/a	P
23	(Finland) Sami Pajari	(Finland) Enni Mälkönen	(Finland) Printsport	Toyota GR Yaris Rally2	—N/a	P
60	(Belgium) Armand Fumal	(France) Jules Escartefigue	(Belgium) Armand Fumal	Alpine A110 Rally RGT	Masters Driver	P

=== Itinerary ===
All dates and times are CET (UTC+1).

Date	No.	Time span	Stage name	Distance
24 January	—N/a	After 16:31	Route de la Garde [Shakedown]	3.28 km
25 January		After 16:52	Opening ceremony, Monaco	—N/a
25 January		19:37 – 19:52	Tyre fitting zone, Digne-les-Bains	—N/a
25 January	SS1	After 20:35	Thoard / Saint-Geniez	21.01 km
25 January	SS2	After 21:58	Bayons / Bréziers	25.19 km
25 January		23:11 – 23:59	Flexi service A, Gap	—N/a
26 January		7:45 – 8:03	Service B, Gap	—N/a
26 January	SS3	After 8:51	Saint-Léger-les-Mélèzes / La Bâtie-Neuve 1	16.68 km
26 January	SS4	After 10:24	Champcella / Saint-Clément 1	17.87 km
26 January	SS5	After 11:57	La Bréole / Selonnet 1	18.31 km
26 January		13:25 – 14:08	Service C, Gap	—N/a
26 January	SS6	After 14:56	Saint-Léger-les-Mélèzes / La Bâtie-Neuve 2	16.68 km
26 January	SS7	After 16:29	Champcella / Saint-Clément 2	17.87 km
26 January	SS8	After 18:02	La Bréole / Selonnet 2	18.31 km
26 January		19:30 – 20:18	Flexi service D, Gap	—N/a
27 January		6:54 – 7:12	Service E, Gap	—N/a
27 January	SS9	After 8:51	Esparron / Oze 1	18.79 km
27 January	SS10	After 9:53	Les Nonières / Chichilianne 1	20.04 km
27 January	SS11	After 11:06	Pellafol / Agnières-en-Dévoluy 1	21.37 km
27 January		12:39 – 13:22	Service F, Gap	—N/a
27 January	SS12	After 14:05	Esparron / Oze 2	18.79 km
27 January	SS13	After 15:53	Les Nonières / Chichilianne 2	20.04 km
27 January	SS14	After 17:06	Pellafol / Agnières-en-Dévoluy 2	21.37 km
27 January		18:39 – 19:27	Flexi service G, Gap	—N/a
28 January		6:03 – 6:21	Service H, Gap	—N/a
28 January	SS15	After 7:04	La Bréole / Selonnet 3	18.31 km
28 January	SS16	After 8:35	Digne-les-Bains / Chaudon-Norante	19.01 km
28 January		11:17 – 12:02	Regroup, Roquebillière	—N/a
28 January	SS17	After 12:15	La Bollène-Vésubie / Col de Turini [Power Stage]	14.80 km

== Report ==
=== WRC Rally1 ===
==== Classification ====
Position		No.	Driver	Co-driver	Entrant	Car	Time	Difference	Points			
Class	Event	No.	Driver	Co-driver	Entrant	Car	Time	Difference	SAT	SUN	WPS	Total
1	1	11	Thierry Neuville	Martijn Wydaeghe	Hyundai Shell Mobis WRT	Hyundai i20 N Rally1	3:09:30.9	0.0	18	7	5	30
2	2	17	Sébastien Ogier	Vincent Landais	Toyota Gazoo Racing WRT	Toyota GR Yaris Rally1	3:09:47.0	+16.1	15	5	4	24
3	3	33	Elfyn Evans	Scott Martin	Toyota Gazoo Racing WRT	Toyota GR Yaris Rally1	3:10:16.1	+45.2	13	6	2	21
4	4	8	Ott Tänak	Martin Järveoja	Hyundai Shell Mobis WRT	Hyundai i20 N Rally1	3:11:30.7	+1:59.8	10	4	1	15
5	5	16	Adrien Fourmaux	Alexandre Coria	M-Sport Ford WRT	Ford Puma Rally1	3:13:07.8	+3:36.9	8	3	0	11
6	6	9	Andreas Mikkelsen	Torstein Eriksen	Hyundai Shell Mobis WRT	Hyundai i20 N Rally1	3:15:05.5	+5:34.6	6	0	0	6
7	7	18	Takamoto Katsuta	Aaron Johnston	Toyota Gazoo Racing WRT	Toyota GR Yaris Rally1	3:17:59.4	+8:58.5	4	2	3	9
8	20	13	Grégoire Munster	Louis Louka	M-Sport Ford WRT	Ford Puma Rally1	3:44:10.9	+34:40.0	0	1	0	1

==== Special stages ====
Stage	Winners	Car	Time	Class leaders
SD	Tänak / Järveoja	Hyundai i20 N Rally1	2:00.5	—N/a
SS1	Evans / Martin	Toyota GR Yaris Rally1	12:12.9	Evans / Martin
SS2	Evans / Martin	Toyota GR Yaris Rally1	14:00.0	Evans / Martin
SS3	Neuville / Wydaeghe	Hyundai i20 N Rally1	9:18.3	Evans / Martin
SS4	Ogier / Landais	Toyota GR Yaris Rally1	9:53.2	Evans / Martin
SS5	Ogier / Landais	Toyota GR Yaris Rally1	10:10.8	Evans / Martin
SS6	Neuville / Wydaeghe	Hyundai i20 N Rally1	9:09.0	Evans / Martin
SS7	Neuville / Wydaeghe	Hyundai i20 N Rally1	9:49.6	Evans / Martin
SS8	Ogier / Landais	Toyota GR Yaris Rally1	10:26.3	Evans / Martin
SS9	Neuville / Wydaeghe	Hyundai i20 N Rally1	12:12.5	Evans / Martin
SS10	Ogier / Landais	Toyota GR Yaris Rally1	11:27.2	Neuville / Wydaeghe
SS11	Tänak / Järveoja	Hyundai i20 N Rally1	12:40.0	Neuville / Wydaeghe
SS11	Neuville / Wydaeghe	Hyundai i20 N Rally1	12:40.0	Neuville / Wydaeghe
SS12	Ogier / Landais	Toyota GR Yaris Rally1	11:23.0	Neuville / Wydaeghe
SS13	Ogier / Landais	Toyota GR Yaris Rally1	11:32.4	Ogier / Landais
SS14	Neuville / Wydaeghe	Hyundai i20 N Rally1	12:47.8	Neuville / Wydaeghe
SS15	Neuville / Wydaeghe	Hyundai i20 N Rally1	10:31.8	Neuville / Wydaeghe
SS16	Neuville / Wydaeghe	Hyundai i20 N Rally1	11:10.2	Neuville / Wydaeghe
SS17	Neuville / Wydaeghe	Hyundai i20 N Rally1	9:50.4	Neuville / Wydaeghe

==== Championship standings ====
Pos.	Drivers' championships			Co-drivers' championships			Manufacturers' championships		
Pos.	Move	Driver	Points	Move	Co-driver	Points	Move	Manufacturer	Points
1	New entry	Thierry Neuville	30	New entry	Martijn Wydaeghe	30	New entry	Toyota Gazoo Racing WRT	46
2	New entry	Sébastien Ogier	24	New entry	Vincent Landais	24	New entry	Hyundai Shell Mobis WRT	45
3	New entry	Elfyn Evans	21	New entry	Scott Martin	21	New entry	M-Sport Ford WRT	13
4	New entry	Ott Tänak	15	New entry	Martin Järveoja	15			
5	New entry	Adrien Fourmaux	11	New entry	Alexandre Coria	11			

=== WRC-2 Rally2 ===
==== Classification ====
Position		No.	Driver	Co-driver	Entrant	Car	Time	Difference	Points	
Event	Class	No.	Driver	Co-driver	Entrant	Car	Time	Difference	Class	Event
8	1	20	Yohan Rossel	Arnaud Dunand	DG Sport Compétition	Citroën C3 Rally2	3:20:00.7	0.0	25	1
9	2	25	Pepe López	David Vázquez Liste	Pepe López	Škoda Fabia RS Rally2	3:20:04.7	+4.0	18	2
10	3	21	Nikolay Gryazin	Konstantin Aleksandrov	DG Sport Compétition	Citroën C3 Rally2	3:20:16.1	+15.4	15	3
11	4	24	Nicolas Ciamin	Yannick Roche	Nicolas Ciamin	Hyundai i20 N Rally2	3:24:15.0	+4:14.3	12	0
13	5	27	Stéphane Lefebvre	Andy Malfoy	Stéphane Lefebvre	Toyota GR Yaris Rally2	3:25:59.2	+5:58.5	10	0
14	6	29	Jan Solans	Rodrigo Sanjuan de Eusebio	Jan Solans	Toyota GR Yaris Rally2	3:29:14.2	+9:13.5	8	0
16	7	35	Olivier Burri	Anderson Levratti	Olivier Burri	Škoda Fabia Rally2 evo	3:40:17.5	+20:16.8	6	0
17	8	32	Mauro Miele	Luca Beltrame	Mauro Miele	Škoda Fabia RS Rally2	3:41:19.9	+21:19.2	4	0
24	9	39	Eamonn Boland	Michael Joseph Morrissey	Eamonn Boland	Ford Fiesta Rally2	3:50:35.5	+30:34.8	2	0
25	10	40	Jourdan Serderidis	Frédéric Miclotte	Jourdan Serderidis	Volkswagen Polo GTI R5	3:51:19.0	+31:18.3	1	0
30	11	30	Alejandro Mauro Sánchez	Adrián Pérez Fernández	Alejandro Mauro Sánchez	Škoda Fabia Rally2 evo	3:58:08.6	+38:07.9	0	0
31	12	37	Federico Laurencich	Alberto Mlakar	Federico Laurencich	Škoda Fabia Rally2 evo	3:58:24.9	+38:24.2	0	0
32	13	43	Maurizio Chiarani	Flavio Zanella	Maurizio Chiarani	Škoda Fabia Rally2 evo	4:00:07.6	+40:06.9	0	0
33	14	34	Roberto Daprà	Luca Guglielmetti	Roberto Daprà	Škoda Fabia Rally2 evo	4:00:17.9	+40:17.2	0	0
36	15	44	Filippo Marchino	Pietro Elia Ometto	Filippo Marchino	Škoda Fabia Rally2 evo	4:02:31.1	+42:30.4	0	0
52	16	38	Massimiliano Locatelli	Stefano Tiraboschi	Massimiliano Locatelli	Škoda Fabia Rally2 evo	4:21:46.1	+1:01:45.4	0	0
53	17	41	Maurizio Morato	Massimiliano Bosi	Maurizio Morato	Škoda Fabia Rally2 evo	4:23:47.4	+1:03:46.7	0	0
55	18	28	Bryan Bouffier	Frédéric Vauclare	Bryan Bouffier	Toyota GR Yaris Rally2	4:27:02.6	+1:07:01.9	0	0
60	19	45	Henk Vossen	Willem Vissenberg	Henk Vossen	Hyundai i20 N Rally2	4:36:34.5	+1:16:30.8	0	0
Retired SS8		26	Chris Ingram	Hannah McKillop	Chris Ingram	Škoda Fabia RS Rally2	Mechanical		0	0
Retired SS3		31	John Wartique	Maxime Andernack	John Wartique	Ford Fiesta Rally2	Engine		0	0

==== Special stages ====
Overall
Stage	Winners	Car	Time	Class leaders
SD	Gryazin / Aleksandrov	Citroën C3 Rally2	2:08.8	—N/a
SS1	López / Vázquez Liste	Škoda Fabia RS Rally2	12:55.3	López / Vázquez Liste
SS2	López / Vázquez Liste	Škoda Fabia RS Rally2	14:54.1	López / Vázquez Liste
SS3	Gryazin / Aleksandrov	Citroën C3 Rally2	10:03.5	Gryazin / Aleksandrov
SS4	López / Vázquez Liste	Škoda Fabia RS Rally2	10:25.0	Gryazin / Aleksandrov
SS5	López / Vázquez Liste	Škoda Fabia RS Rally2	10:46.6	López / Vázquez Liste
SS6	Gryazin / Aleksandrov	Citroën C3 Rally2	9:46.1	Gryazin / Aleksandrov
SS7	López / Vázquez Liste	Škoda Fabia RS Rally2	10:29.3	López / Vázquez Liste
SS8	Gryazin / Aleksandrov	Citroën C3 Rally2	11:05.8	Gryazin / Aleksandrov
SS9	López / Vázquez Liste	Škoda Fabia RS Rally2	12:52.1	Gryazin / Aleksandrov
SS10	Gryazin / Aleksandrov	Citroën C3 Rally2	12:06.4	Gryazin / Aleksandrov
SS11	Rossel / Dunand	Citroën C3 Rally2	13:19.5	Gryazin / Aleksandrov
SS12	López / Vázquez Liste	Škoda Fabia RS Rally2	11:56.5	López / Vázquez Liste
SS13	Rossel / Dunand	Citroën C3 Rally2	12:08.5	López / Vázquez Liste
SS14	Rossel / Dunand	Citroën C3 Rally2	13:27.3	Gryazin / Aleksandrov
SS15	Rossel / Dunand	Citroën C3 Rally2	11:06.7	López / Vázquez Liste
SS16	Rossel / Dunand	Citroën C3 Rally2	11:39.1	López / Vázquez Liste
SS17	Rossel / Dunand	Citroën C3 Rally2	10:13.8	Rossel / Dunand

Challenger
Stage	Winners	Car	Time	Class leaders
SD	Gryazin / Aleksandrov	Citroën C3 Rally2	2:08.8	—N/a
SS1	López / Vázquez Liste	Škoda Fabia RS Rally2	12:55.3	López / Vázquez Liste
SS2	López / Vázquez Liste	Škoda Fabia RS Rally2	14:54.1	López / Vázquez Liste
SS3	Gryazin / Aleksandrov	Citroën C3 Rally2	10:03.5	Gryazin / Aleksandrov
SS4	López / Vázquez Liste	Škoda Fabia RS Rally2	10:25.0	Gryazin / Aleksandrov
SS5	López / Vázquez Liste	Škoda Fabia RS Rally2	10:46.6	López / Vázquez Liste
SS6	Gryazin / Aleksandrov	Citroën C3 Rally2	9:46.1	Gryazin / Aleksandrov
SS7	López / Vázquez Liste	Škoda Fabia RS Rally2	10:29.3	López / Vázquez Liste
SS8	Gryazin / Aleksandrov	Citroën C3 Rally2	11:05.8	Gryazin / Aleksandrov
SS9	López / Vázquez Liste	Škoda Fabia RS Rally2	12:52.1	Gryazin / Aleksandrov
SS10	Gryazin / Aleksandrov	Citroën C3 Rally2	12:06.4	Gryazin / Aleksandrov
SS11	Gryazin / Aleksandrov	Citroën C3 Rally2	13:21.3	Gryazin / Aleksandrov
SS12	López / Vázquez Liste	Škoda Fabia RS Rally2	11:56.5	López / Vázquez Liste
SS13	Gryazin / Aleksandrov	Citroën C3 Rally2	12:11.3	López / Vázquez Liste
SS14	Gryazin / Aleksandrov	Citroën C3 Rally2	13:27.8	Gryazin / Aleksandrov
SS15	López / Vázquez Liste	Škoda Fabia RS Rally2	11:06.7	López / Vázquez Liste
SS16	López / Vázquez Liste	Škoda Fabia RS Rally2	11:44.9	López / Vázquez Liste
SS17	López / Vázquez Liste	Škoda Fabia RS Rally2	10:18.7	López / Vázquez Liste

==== Championship standings ====
Pos.	Open Drivers' championships			Open Co-drivers' championships			Teams' championships			Challenger Drivers' championships			Challenger Co-drivers' championships		
Pos.	Move	Driver	Points	Move	Co-driver	Points	Move	Manufacturer	Points	Move	Manufacturer	Points	Move	Driver	Points
1	New entry	Yohan Rossel	25	New entry	Arnaud Dunand	25	New entry	DG Sport Compétition	43	New entry	Pepe López	25	New entry	David Vázquez Liste	25
2	New entry	Pepe López	18	New entry	David Vázquez Liste	18				New entry	Nikolay Gryazin	18	New entry	Konstantin Aleksandrov	18
3	New entry	Pepe López	15	New entry	Borja Rozada	15				New entry	Nicolas Ciamin	15	New entry	Yannick Roche	15
4	New entry	Nicolas Ciamin	12	New entry	Yannick Roche	12				New entry	Jan Solans	12	New entry	Rodrigo Sanjuan de Eusebio	12
5	New entry	Stéphane Lefebvre	10	New entry	Andy Malfoy	10				New entry	Olivier Burri	10	New entry	Anderson Levratti	10

=== WRC-3 Rally3 ===
==== Classification ====
Position		No.	Driver	Co-driver	Entrant	Car	Time	Difference	Points
Event	Class	No.	Driver	Co-driver	Entrant	Car	Time	Difference	Points
18	1	46	Jan Černý	Ondřej Krajča	Jan Černý	Ford Fiesta Rally3	3:42:09.1	0.0	25
26	2	47	Ghjuvanni Rossi	Kylian Sarmezan	Ghjuvanni Rossi	Renault Clio Rally3	3:52:51.7	+10:42.6	18

==== Special stages ====
Stage	Winners	Car	Time	Class leaders
SD	Černý / Krajča	Ford Fiesta Rally3	2:21.8	—N/a
SS1	Rossi / Sarmezan	Renault Clio Rally3	14:34.1	Rossi / Sarmezan
SS2	Černý / Krajča	Ford Fiesta Rally3	16:40.1	Černý / Krajča
SS3	Černý / Krajča	Ford Fiesta Rally3	11:20.5	Černý / Krajča
SS4	Černý / Krajča	Ford Fiesta Rally3	11:33.7	Černý / Krajča
SS5	Černý / Krajča	Ford Fiesta Rally3	12:14.9	Černý / Krajča
SS6	Černý / Krajča	Ford Fiesta Rally3	10:41.2	Černý / Krajča
SS7	Černý / Krajča	Ford Fiesta Rally3	11:49.9	Černý / Krajča
SS8	Černý / Krajča	Ford Fiesta Rally3	12:57.8	Černý / Krajča
SS9	Černý / Krajča	Ford Fiesta Rally3	14:45.4	Černý / Krajča
SS10	Černý / Krajča	Ford Fiesta Rally3	13:15.4	Černý / Krajča
SS11	Černý / Krajča	Ford Fiesta Rally3	14:35.1	Černý / Krajča
SS12	Černý / Krajča	Ford Fiesta Rally3	13:07.6	Černý / Krajča
SS13	Černý / Krajča	Ford Fiesta Rally3	13:16.1	Černý / Krajča
SS14	Černý / Krajča	Ford Fiesta Rally3	14:53.8	Černý / Krajča
SS15	Černý / Krajča	Ford Fiesta Rally3	12:13.2	Černý / Krajča
SS16	Černý / Krajča	Ford Fiesta Rally3	12:59.2	Černý / Krajča
SS17	Černý / Krajča	Ford Fiesta Rally3	11:04.0	Černý / Krajča

==== Championship standings ====
Pos.	Drivers' championships			Co-drivers' championships		
Pos.	Move	Driver	Points	Move	Co-driver	Points
1	New entry	Jan Černý	25	New entry	Ondřej Krajča	25
2	New entry	Ghjuvanni Rossi	18	New entry	Kylian Sarmezan	18

== Notes ==
Previous rally: 2023 Rally Japan (2023)	2024 FIA World Rally Championship	Next rally: 2024 Rally Sweden
Previous rally: 2023 Monte Carlo Rally	2024 Monte Carlo Rally	Next rally: 2025 Monte Carlo Rally
