= 2024 Rally Sweden =

71st edition of Rally Sweden

2024 Rally Sweden Swedish Rally 2024
Round 2 of 13 in the 2024 World Rally Championship
← Previous event	Next event →
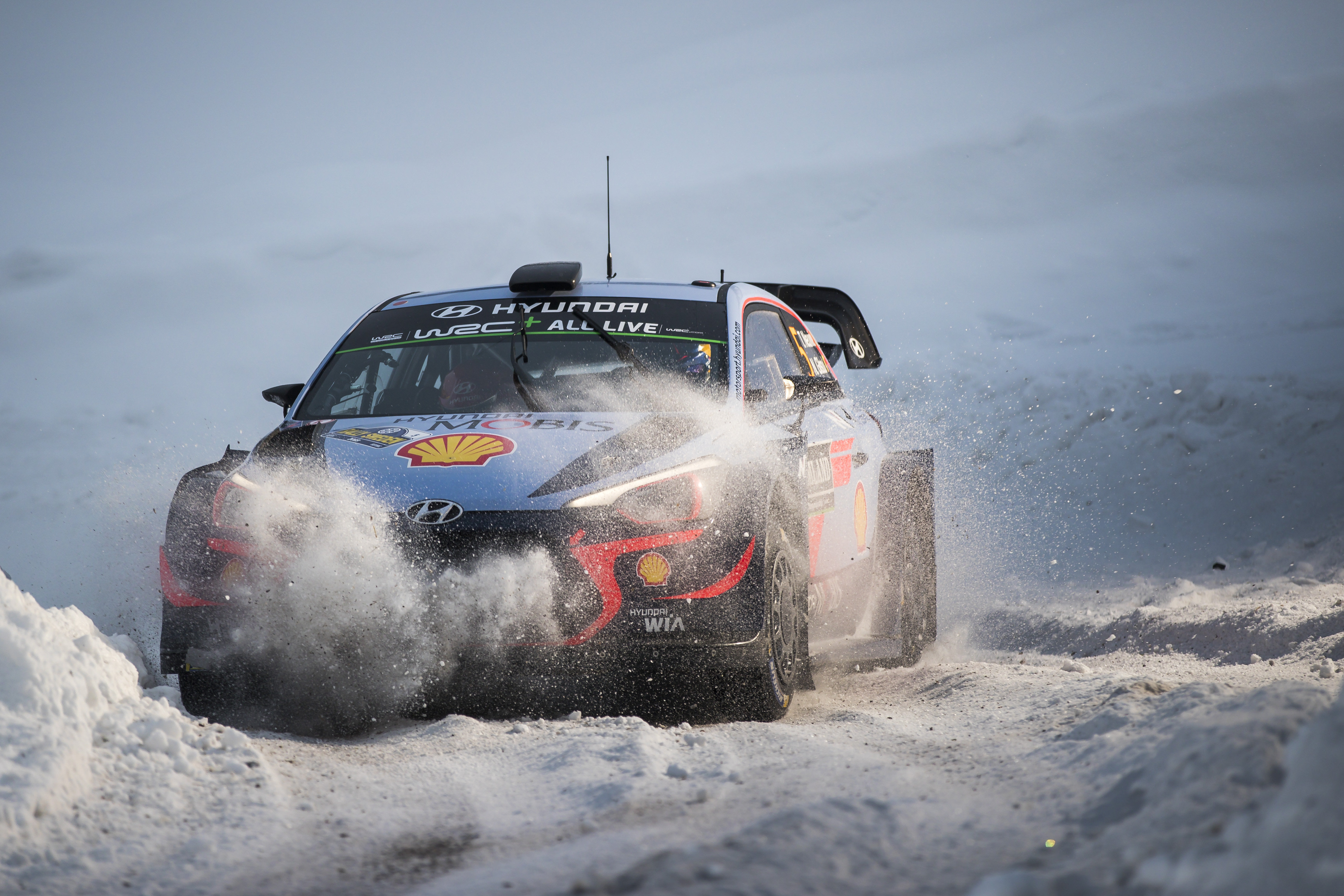
- Rally Sweden is the only snow event on the World Rally Championship calendar.
- Host country: Sweden
- Rally base: Umeå, Västerbotten County
- Dates run: 15 – 18 February 2024
- Start location: Umeå, Västerbotten County
- Finish location: Umeå, Västerbotten County
- Stages: 18 (300.10 km; 186.47 miles)
- Stage surface: Snow
- Transport distance: 902.01 km (560.48 miles)
- Overall distance: 1,202.11 km (746.96 miles)

Statistics
- Crews registered: 57
- Crews: 56 at start, 50 at finish

Overall results
- Overall winner: (Finland) Esapekka Lappi (Finland) Janne Ferm (South Korea) Hyundai Shell Mobis WRT; 2:33:04.9
- Saturday Overall leader: (Finland) Esapekka Lappi (Finland) Janne Ferm (South Korea) Hyundai Shell Mobis WRT; 2:03:52.0
- Sunday Accumulated leader: (United Kingdom) Elfyn Evans (United Kingdom) Scott Martin (Japan) Toyota Gazoo Racing WRT; 28:19.5
- Power Stage winner: (Finland) Kalle Rovanperä (Finland) Jonne Halttunen (Japan) Toyota Gazoo Racing WRT; 5:33.8

Support category results
- WRC-2 winner: (Sweden) Oliver Solberg (United Kingdom) Elliott Edmondson (Germany) Toksport WRT; 2:38:09.1
- WRC-3 winner: (Sweden) Mille Johansson (Sweden) Johan Grönvall; 2:49:33.8
- J-WRC winner: (Sweden) Mille Johansson (Sweden) Johan Grönvall; 2:49:33.8

The 2024 Rally Sweden (also known as the 2024 Swedish Rally) was a motor racing event for rally cars held over four days from 15 to 18 February 2024. It marked the seventy-first running of the Rally Sweden, and is the second round of the 2024 World Rally Championship, World Rally Championship-2 and World Rally Championship-3. The event was the first round of the 2024 Junior World Rally Championship. The 2024 event was based in Umeå in the Västerbotten County and consisted of eighteen special stages, covering a total competitive distance of 300.10 km (186.47 mi).

Ott Tänak and Martin Järveoja were the defending rally winners. The team they drove for in 2023, M-Sport Ford WRT, were the defending manufacturer's winners. Oliver Solberg and Elliott Edmondson were the defending rally winners in the WRC-2 category. Roope Korhonen and Anssi Viinikka were the defending rally winners in the WRC-3 category. William Creighton and Liam Regan were the defending rally winners in the junior championship.

Esapekka Lappi and Janne Ferm won the rally, ending their victory drought over six years. Their team, Hyundai Shell Mobis WRT were the manufacturer's winners. Oliver Solberg and Elliott Edmondson successfully defended their titles in the World Rally Championship-2 category. Mille Johansson and Johan Grönvall won the World Rally Championship-3 category, as well as the junior class.

== Background ==
=== Entry list ===
The following crews entered the rally. The event was opened to crews competing in the World Rally Championship, its support categories, the World Rally Championship-2 and World Rally Championship-3 as well as the Junior World Rally Championship, and privateer entries that were not registered to score points in any championship. Nine entered under Rally1 regulations, as were twenty Rally2 crews in the World Rally Championship-2 and eighteen Rally3 crews in the World Rally Championship-3. A total of nineteen crews participated in the Junior World Rally Championship.

Rally1 entries competing in the World Rally Championship
No.	Driver	Co-Driver	Entrant	Car	Championship eligibility	Tyre
4	(Finland) Esapekka Lappi	(Finland) Janne Ferm	(South Korea) Hyundai Shell Mobis WRT	Hyundai i20 N Rally1	Driver, Co-driver, Manufacturer	P
8	(Estonia) Ott Tänak	(Estonia) Martin Järveoja	(South Korea) Hyundai Shell Mobis WRT	Hyundai i20 N Rally1	Driver, Co-driver, Manufacturer	P
11	(Belgium) Thierry Neuville	(Belgium) Martijn Wydaeghe	(South Korea) Hyundai Shell Mobis WRT	Hyundai i20 N Rally1	Driver, Co-driver, Manufacturer	P
13	(Luxembourg) Grégoire Munster	(Belgium) Louis Louka	(United Kingdom) M-Sport Ford WRT	Ford Puma Rally1	Driver, Co-driver, Manufacturer	P
16	(France) Adrien Fourmaux	(France) Alexandre Coria	(United Kingdom) M-Sport Ford WRT	Ford Puma Rally1	Driver, Co-driver, Manufacturer	P
18	(Japan) Takamoto Katsuta	(Republic of Ireland) Aaron Johnston	(Japan) Toyota Gazoo Racing WRT	Toyota GR Yaris Rally1	Driver, Co-driver, Manufacturer	P
33	(United Kingdom) Elfyn Evans	(United Kingdom) Scott Martin	(Japan) Toyota Gazoo Racing WRT	Toyota GR Yaris Rally1	Driver, Co-driver, Manufacturer	P
37	(Italy) Lorenzo Bertelli	(Italy) Simone Scattolin	(Japan) Toyota Gazoo Racing WRT	Toyota GR Yaris Rally1	Driver, Co-driver	P
69	(Finland) Kalle Rovanperä	(Finland) Jonne Halttunen	(Japan) Toyota Gazoo Racing WRT	Toyota GR Yaris Rally1	Driver, Co-driver, Manufacturer	P

Rally2 entries competing in the World Rally Championship-2
No.	Driver	Co-Driver	Entrant	Car	Championship eligibility	Tyre
21	(Sweden) Oliver Solberg	(United Kingdom) Elliott Edmondson	(Germany) Toksport WRT	Škoda Fabia RS Rally2	Driver, Co-driver	P
22	(Finland) Sami Pajari	(Finland) Enni Mälkönen	(Finland) Printsport	Toyota GR Yaris Rally2	Challenger Driver, Challenger Co-driver	P
23	(Finland) Emil Lindholm	(Finland) Reeta Hämäläinen	(Finland) Emil Lindholm	Hyundai i20 N Rally2	Driver, Co-driver	P
24	(Finland) Lauri Joona	(Finland) Janni Hussi	(Finland) Lauri Joona	Škoda Fabia RS Rally2	Challenger Driver, Challenger Co-driver	P
25	(Estonia) Georg Linnamäe	(United Kingdom) James Morgan	(Estonia) Georg Linnamäe	Toyota GR Yaris Rally2	Challenger Driver, Challenger Co-driver	P
26	(Finland) Mikko Heikkilä	(Finland) Kristian Temonen	(Finland) Mikko Heikkilä	Toyota GR Yaris Rally2	Challenger Driver, Challenger Co-driver	P
27	(Paraguay) Fabrizio Zaldivar	(Italy) Marcelo Der Ohannesian	(Paraguay) Fabrizio Zaldivar	Škoda Fabia RS Rally2	Challenger Driver, Challenger Co-driver	P
28	(Estonia) Gregor Jeets	(Estonia) Timo Taniel	(Estonia) Gregor Jeets	Škoda Fabia RS Rally2	Challenger Driver, Challenger Co-driver	P
29	(Finland) Roope Korhonen	(Finland) Anssi Viinikka	(Finland) Roope Korhonen	Toyota GR Yaris Rally2	Challenger Driver, Challenger Co-driver	P
30	(Republic of Ireland) William Creighton	(Republic of Ireland) Liam Regan	(Republic of Ireland) William Creighton	Ford Fiesta Rally2	Challenger Driver, Challenger Co-driver	P
31	(Spain) Jan Solans	(Spain) Rodrigo Sanjuan de Eusebio	(Spain) Jan Solans	Toyota GR Yaris Rally2	Challenger Driver, Challenger Co-driver	P
32	(Sweden) Isak Reiersen	(Sweden) Lucas Karlsson	(Sweden) Isak Reiersen	Škoda Fabia RS Rally2	Challenger Driver, Challenger Co-driver	P
34	(Japan) Yuki Yamamoto	(Finland) Marko Salminen	(Japan) Toyota Gazoo Racing WRT NG	Toyota GR Yaris Rally2	Challenger Driver, Challenger Co-driver, Team	P
35	(Japan) Hikaru Kogure	(Finland) Topi Matias Luhtinen	(Japan) Toyota Gazoo Racing WRT NG	Toyota GR Yaris Rally2	Challenger Driver, Challenger Co-driver, Team	P
36	(Poland) Michał Sołowow	(Poland) Maciej Baran	(Finland) Printsport	Škoda Fabia RS Rally2	Challenger/Masters Driver, Challenger Co-driver	P
38	(Saudi Arabia) Rakan Al-Rashed	(Portugal) Hugo Magalhães	(Finland) Printsport	Škoda Fabia RS Rally2	Challenger Driver, Challenger Co-driver	P
39	(Finland) Marko Viitanen	(Finland) Tapio Suominen	(Finland) Marko Viitanen	Škoda Fabia RS Rally2	Challenger/Masters Driver, Challenger Co-driver	P
40	(Mexico) Alejandro Mauro Sánchez	(Spain) Adrián Pérez Fernández	(Mexico) Alejandro Mauro Sánchez	Škoda Fabia Rally2 evo	Challenger Driver, Challenger Co-driver	P
41	(United Kingdom) James Leckey	(United Kingdom) Stephen McAuley	(United Kingdom) James Leckey	Citroën C3 Rally2	Challenger Driver, Challenger Co-driver	P
66	(Poland) Jarosław Kołtun	(Poland) Ireneusz Pleskot	(Poland) Jarosław Kołtun	Ford Fiesta Rally2	Challenger Driver, Challenger Co-driver	P

Rally3 entries competing in the World Rally Championship-3 and/or the Junior World Rally Championship
No.	Driver	Co-Driver	Entrant	Car	Class eligibility	Tyre
43	(Czech Republic) Jan Černý	(Czech Republic) Ondřej Krajča	(Czech Republic) Jan Černý	Ford Fiesta Rally3	WRC-3	P
44	(Czech Republic) Filip Kohn	(United Kingdom) Tom Woodburn	(Czech Republic) Filip Kohn	Ford Fiesta Rally3	WRC-3	P
45	(Paraguay) Diego Dominguez Jr.	(Spain) Rogelio Peñate	(Paraguay) Diego Dominguez Jr.	Ford Fiesta Rally3	WRC-3, Junior WRC	P
46	(Romania) Norbert Maior	(Romania) Francesca Maria Maior	(Romania) Norbert Maior	Ford Fiesta Rally3	WRC-3, Junior WRC	P
47	(Estonia) Romet Jürgenson	(Estonia) Siim Oja	FIA Rally Star	Ford Fiesta Rally3	WRC-3, Junior WRC	P
48	(Bolivia) Bruno Bulacia	(Brazil) Gabriel Morales	(Bolivia) Bruno Bulacia	Ford Fiesta Rally3	WRC-3, Junior WRC	P
49	(Republic of Ireland) Eamonn Kelly	(Republic of Ireland) Conor Mohan	(Republic of Ireland) Motorsport Ireland Rally Academy	Ford Fiesta Rally3	WRC-3, Junior WRC	P
50	(Poland) Jakub Matulka	(Poland) Daniel Dymurski	(Poland) Jakub Matulka	Ford Fiesta Rally3	WRC-3, Junior WRC	P
51	(Sweden) Mille Johansson	(Sweden) Johan Grönvall	(Sweden) Mille Johansson	Ford Fiesta Rally3	WRC-3, Junior WRC	P
52	(Germany) Fabio Schwarz	(Austria) Bernhard Ettel	(Germany) Armin Schwarz Driving Experience	Ford Fiesta Rally3	WRC-3, Junior WRC	P
53	(Spain) Roberto Blach Núñez	(Spain) Mauro Barreiro	(Spain) Roberto Blach Núñez	Ford Fiesta Rally3	WRC-3, Junior WRC	P
54	(Belgium) Tom Rensonnet	(Belgium) Loïc Dumont	(Belgium) RACB National Team	Ford Fiesta Rally3	WRC-3, Junior WRC	P
55	(Australia) Taylor Gill	(Australia) Daniel Brkic	FIA Rally Star	Ford Fiesta Rally3	WRC-3, Junior WRC	P
56	(Spain) Raúl Hernández	(Spain) José Murado González	(Spain) Raúl Hernández	Ford Fiesta Rally3	WRC-3, Junior WRC	P
57	(Bolivia) Nataniel Bruun	(Argentina) Pablo Olmos	(Bolivia) Nataniel Bruun	Ford Fiesta Rally3	WRC-3, Junior WRC	P
58	(Kazakhstan) Petr Borodin	(Kazakhstan) Roman Cheprasov	(Kazakhstan) ASP Racing	Ford Fiesta Rally3	WRC-3, Junior WRC	P
59	(Oman) Abdullah Al-Rawahi	(Jordan) Ata Al-Hmoud	(Oman) Abdullah Al-Rawahi	Ford Fiesta Rally3	Junior WRC	P
60	(Chile) Gerardo V. Rosselot	(Argentina) Marcelo Brizio	(Chile) Gerardo V. Rosselot	Ford Fiesta Rally3	Junior WRC	P
61	(Peru) Jose Abito Caparo	(Spain) Esther Gutiérrez Porras	FIA Rally Star	Ford Fiesta Rally3	WRC-3, Junior WRC	P
62	(South Africa) Max Smart	(United Kingdom) Cameron Fair	FIA Rally Star	Ford Fiesta Rally3	WRC-3, Junior WRC	P
63	(Peru) Andre Martinez	(Peru) Guillermo Sierra Ovalle	(Peru) Andre Martinez	Ford Fiesta Rally3	Junior WRC	P

Other major entries
No.	Driver	Co-Driver	Entrant	Car	Championship eligibility	Tyre
20	(Bulgaria) Nikolay Gryazin	Konstantin Aleksandrov (Note: Konstantin Aleksandrov is Russian, but he competes as a neutral competitor using the ANA flag as Russian national emblems were banned by the association due to the Russian invasion of Ukraine.)	(Bulgaria) Nikolay Gryazin	Citroën C3 Rally2	—N/a	P
64	(Mexico) Ricardo Triviño	(Spain) Diego Fuentes Vega	(Mexico) Ricardo Triviño	Škoda Fabia RS Rally2	Masters Driver	P

=== Itinerary ===
All dates and times are CET (UTC+1).

Date	No.	Time span	Stage name	Distance
15 February	—N/a	After 9:01	Håkmark [Shakedown]	5.42 km
15 February		After 18:40	Opening ceremony, Red Barn Arena	—N/a
15 February	SS1	After 19:05	Umeå Sprint 1	5.16 km
16 February	SS2	After 8:58	#42 Brattby 1	10.76 km
16 February	SS3	After 9:52	Norrby 1	12.36 km
16 February	SS4	After 10:55	Floda 1	28.25 km
16 February		13:28 – 13:58	Flexi service A, Umeå	—N/a
16 February	SS5	After 14:36	#42 Brattby 2	10.76 km
16 February	SS6	After 15:30	Norrby 2	12.36 km
16 February	SS7	After 16:33	Floda 2	28.25 km
16 February		18:02 – 18:22	Regroup, Red Barn	—N/a
16 February	SS8	After 19:05	Umeå Sprint 2	5.16 km
16 February		19:37 – 20:22	Flexi service B, Umeå	—N/a
17 February	SS9	After 7:45	Vännäs 1	15.65 km
17 February	SS10	After 8:35	Sarsjöliden 1	14.23 km
17 February	SS11	After 10:08	Bygdsiljum 1	28.06 km
17 February		13:00 – 13:30	Flexi service C, Umeå	—N/a
17 February	SS12	After 14:15	Vännäs 2	15.65 km
17 February	SS13	After 15:05	Sarsjöliden 2	14.23 km
17 February	SS14	After 16:38	Bygdsiljum 2	28.06 km
17 February		18:15 – 18:40	Regroup, Red Barn	—N/a
17 February	SS15	After 19:05	Umeå 1	10.08 km
17 February		19:52 – 20:37	Flexi service D, Umeå	—N/a
18 February	SS16	After 7:27	Västervik 1	25.50 km
18 February		8:10 – 8:50	Regroup, Umeå	—N/a
18 February		9:06 – 9:21	Flexi service E, Umeå	—N/a
18 February	SS17	After 10:03	Västervik 1	25.50 km
18 February		11:10 – 11:55	Regroup, Red Barn	—N/a
18 February	SS18	After 12:15	Umeå 2 [Power Stage]	10.08 km
18 February		After 13:30	Podium ceremony, Red Barn Arena	—N/a

== Report ==
=== WRC Rally1 ===
==== Classification ====
Position		No.	Driver	Co-driver	Entrant	Car	Time	Difference	Points			
Class	Event	No.	Driver	Co-driver	Entrant	Car	Time	Difference	SAT	SUN	WPS	Total
1	1	4	Esapekka Lappi	Janne Ferm	Hyundai Shell Mobis WRT	Hyundai i20 N Rally1	2:33:04.9	0.0	18	1	0	19
2	2	33	Elfyn Evans	Scott Martin	Toyota Gazoo Racing WRT	Toyota GR Yaris Rally1	2:33:34.5	+29.6	13	7	4	24
3	3	16	Adrien Fourmaux	Alexandre Coria	M-Sport Ford WRT	Ford Puma Rally1	2:33:52.8	+47.9	15	3	0	18
4	4	11	Thierry Neuville	Martijn Wydaeghe	Hyundai Shell Mobis WRT	Hyundai i20 N Rally1	2:34:51.2	+1:46.3	10	5	3	18
5	10	37	Lorenzo Bertelli	Simone Scattolin	Toyota Gazoo Racing WRT	Toyota GR Yaris Rally1	2:40:42.6	+7:37.7	0	0	0	0
6	23	13	Grégoire Munster	Louis Louka	M-Sport Ford WRT	Ford Puma Rally1	2:56:21.0	+23:16.1	0	0	0	0
7	39	69	Kalle Rovanperä	Jonne Halttunen	Toyota Gazoo Racing WRT	Toyota GR Yaris Rally1	3:21:36.8	+48:31.9	0	6	5	11
8	41	8	Ott Tänak	Martin Järveoja	Hyundai Shell Mobis WRT	Hyundai i20 N Rally1	3:22:33.8	+49:28.9	0	4	2	6
9	45	18	Takamoto Katsuta	Aaron Johnston	Toyota Gazoo Racing WRT	Toyota GR Yaris Rally1	3:32:09.4	+59:04.5	0	2	1	3

==== Special stages ====
Stage	Winners	Car	Time	Class leaders
SD	Lappi / Ferm	Hyundai i20 N Rally1	2:45.9	—N/a
SS1	Rovanperä / Halttunen	Toyota GR Yaris Rally1	3:18.3	Rovanperä / Halttunen
SS2	Rovanperä / Halttunen	Toyota GR Yaris Rally1	6:12.7	Rovanperä / Halttunen
SS3	Lappi / Ferm	Hyundai i20 N Rally1	5:47.1	Rovanperä / Halttunen
SS4	Katsuta / Johnston	Toyota GR Yaris Rally1	12:40.6	Katsuta / Johnston
SS5	Lappi / Ferm	Hyundai i20 N Rally1	6:56.4	Katsuta / Johnston
SS6	Lappi / Ferm	Hyundai i20 N Rally1	6:11.8	Katsuta / Johnston
SS7	Lappi / Ferm	Hyundai i20 N Rally1	13:26.3	Lappi / Ferm
SS8	Lappi / Ferm	Hyundai i20 N Rally1	3:27.3	Lappi / Ferm
SS9	Tänak / Järveoja	Hyundai i20 N Rally1	9:00.5	Lappi / Ferm
SS10	Rovanperä / Halttunen	Toyota GR Yaris Rally1	6:36.1	Lappi / Ferm
SS11	Fourmaux / Coria	Ford Puma Rally1	13:56.6	Lappi / Ferm
SS12	Evans / Martin	Toyota GR Yaris Rally1	8:54.5	Lappi / Ferm
SS13	Neuville / Wydaeghe	Hyundai i20 N Rally1	6:40.6	Lappi / Ferm
SS14	Neuville / Wydaeghe	Hyundai i20 N Rally1	13:46.8	Lappi / Ferm
SS15	Neuville / Wydaeghe	Hyundai i20 N Rally1	5:48.8	Lappi / Ferm
SS16	Rovanperä / Halttunen	Toyota GR Yaris Rally1	11:19.3	Lappi / Ferm
SS17	Evans / Martin	Toyota GR Yaris Rally1	11:20.0	Lappi / Ferm
SS18	Rovanperä / Halttunen	Toyota GR Yaris Rally1	5:33.8	Lappi / Ferm

==== Championship standings ====
Pos.	Drivers' championships			Co-drivers' championships			Manufacturers' championships		
Pos.	Move	Driver	Points	Move	Co-driver	Points	Move	Manufacturer	Points
1		Thierry Neuville	48		Martijn Wydaeghe	48	1	Hyundai Shell Mobis WRT	87
2	1	Elfyn Evans	45	1	Scott Martin	45	1	Toyota Gazoo Racing WRT	87
3	2	Adrien Fourmaux	29	2	Alexandre Coria	29		M-Sport Ford WRT	47
4	2	Sébastien Ogier	24	2	Vincent Landais	24			
5	1	Ott Tänak	21	1	Martin Järveoja	21			

=== WRC-2 Rally2 ===
==== Classification ====
Position		No.	Driver	Co-driver	Entrant	Car	Time	Difference	Points	
Event	Class	No.	Driver	Co-driver	Entrant	Car	Time	Difference	Class	Event
5	1	21	Oliver Solberg	Elliott Edmondson	Toksport WRT	Škoda Fabia RS Rally2	2:38:09.1	0.0	25	8
6	2	22	Sami Pajari	Enni Mälkönen	Printsport	Toyota GR Yaris Rally2	2:39:28.8	+1:19.7	18	6
7	3	25	Georg Linnamäe	James Morgan	Georg Linnamäe	Toyota GR Yaris Rally2	2:39:31.3	+1:22.2	15	4
8	4	29	Roope Korhonen	Anssi Viinikka	Roope Korhonen	Toyota GR Yaris Rally2	2:39:53.0	+1:43.9	12	3
9	5	26	Mikko Heikkilä	Kristian Temonen	Mikko Heikkilä	Toyota GR Yaris Rally2	2:40:30.6	+2:21.5	10	2
11	6	24	Lauri Joona	Janni Hussi	Lauri Joona	Škoda Fabia RS Rally2	2:41:07.7	+2:58.6	8	1
12	7	23	Emil Lindholm	Reeta Hämäläinen	Emil Lindholm	Hyundai i20 N Rally2	2:42:28.7	+4:19.6	6	0
13	8	32	Isak Reiersen	Lucas Karlsson	Isak Reiersen	Škoda Fabia RS Rally2	2:43:34.4	+5:25.3	4	0
14	9	36	Michał Sołowow	Maciej Baran	Printsport	Škoda Fabia RS Rally2	2:47:46.2	+9:37.1	2	0
15	10	34	Yuki Yamamoto	Marko Salminen	Toyota Gazoo Racing WRT NG	Toyota GR Yaris Rally2	2:48:25.1	+10:16.0	1	0
18	11	28	Gregor Jeets	Timo Taniel	Gregor Jeets	Škoda Fabia RS Rally2	2:51:31.4	+13:22.3	0	0
22	12	31	Jan Solans	Rodrigo Sanjuan de Eusebio	Jan Solans	Toyota GR Yaris Rally2	2:54:35.2	+16:26.1	0	0
25	13	66	Jarosław Kołtun	Ireneusz Pleskot	Jarosław Kołtun	Ford Fiesta Rally2	2:57:53.0	+19:43.9	0	0
26	14	30	William Creighton	Liam Regan	William Creighton	Ford Fiesta Rally2	2:59:41.8	+21:32:7	0	0
34	15	40	Alejandro Mauro Sánchez	Adrián Pérez Fernández	Alejandro Mauro Sánchez	Škoda Fabia Rally2 evo	3:02:59.0	+24:49.9	0	0
36	16	38	Rakan Al-Rashed	Hugo Magalhães	Printsport	Škoda Fabia RS Rally2	3:05:27.1	+27:18.0	0	0
40	17	27	Fabrizio Zaldivar	Marcelo Der Ohannesian	Fabrizio Zaldivar	Škoda Fabia RS Rally2	3:22:23.3	+44:14.2	0	0
42	18	41	James Leckey	Stephen McAuley	James Leckey	Citroën C3 Rally2	3:24:37.2	+46:28.1	0	0
44	19	39	Marko Viitanen	Tapio Suominen	Marko Viitanen	Škoda Fabia RS Rally2	3:31:45.9	+53:36.8	0	0
46	20	35	Hikaru Kogure	Topi Matias Luhtinen	Toyota Gazoo Racing WRT NG	Toyota GR Yaris Rally2	3:32:21.4	+54:12.3	0	0

==== Special stages ====
Overall
Stage	Winners	Car	Time	Class leaders
SD	Solberg / Edmondson	Škoda Fabia RS Rally2	2:56.1	—N/a
SS1	Solberg / Edmondson	Škoda Fabia RS Rally2	3:27.1	Solberg / Edmondson
SS2	Solberg / Edmondson	Škoda Fabia RS Rally2	6:32.0	Solberg / Edmondson
SS3	Solberg / Edmondson	Škoda Fabia RS Rally2	6:08.0	Solberg / Edmondson
SS4	Solberg / Edmondson	Škoda Fabia RS Rally2	13:07.7	Solberg / Edmondson
SS5	Linnamäe / Morgan	Toyota GR Yaris Rally2	6:50.6	Solberg / Edmondson
SS6	Linnamäe / Morgan	Toyota GR Yaris Rally2	6:14.4	Solberg / Edmondson
SS7	Solberg / Edmondson	Škoda Fabia RS Rally2	13:38.7	Solberg / Edmondson
SS8	Solberg / Edmondson	Škoda Fabia RS Rally2	3:32.8	Solberg / Edmondson
SS9	Solberg / Edmondson	Škoda Fabia RS Rally2	9:24.1	Solberg / Edmondson
SS10	Heikkilä / Temonen	Toyota GR Yaris Rally2	7:02.6	Solberg / Edmondson
SS11	Solberg / Edmondson	Škoda Fabia RS Rally2	14:27.7	Solberg / Edmondson
SS12	Pajari / Mälkönen	Toyota GR Yaris Rally2	9:16.1	Solberg / Edmondson
SS13	Solans / Sanjuan	Toyota GR Yaris Rally2	7:06.2	Solberg / Edmondson
SS14	Linnamäe / Morgan	Toyota GR Yaris Rally2	14:38.5	Solberg / Edmondson
SS15	Solberg / Edmondson	Škoda Fabia RS Rally2	6:05.4	Solberg / Edmondson
SS16	Solberg / Edmondson	Škoda Fabia RS Rally2	12:13.4	Solberg / Edmondson
SS17	Pajari / Mälkönen	Toyota GR Yaris Rally2	12:05.9	Solberg / Edmondson
SS18	Solberg / Edmondson	Škoda Fabia RS Rally2	5:51.3	Solberg / Edmondson

Challenger
Stage	Winners	Car	Time	Class leaders
SD	Linnamäe / Morgan	Toyota GR Yaris Rally2	2:56.7	—N/a
SS1	Korhonen / Viinikka	Toyota GR Yaris Rally2	3:30.1	Korhonen / Viinikka
SS2	Pajari / Mälkönen	Toyota GR Yaris Rally2	6:34.1	Pajari / Mälkönen
SS3	Linnamäe / Morgan	Toyota GR Yaris Rally2	6:08.8	Pajari / Mälkönen
SS4	Pajari / Mälkönen	Toyota GR Yaris Rally2	13:16.5	Pajari / Mälkönen
SS5	Linnamäe / Morgan	Toyota GR Yaris Rally2	6:50.6	Linnamäe / Morgan
SS6	Linnamäe / Morgan	Toyota GR Yaris Rally2	6:14.4	Linnamäe / Morgan
SS7	Heikkilä / Temonen	Toyota GR Yaris Rally2	13:44.8	Linnamäe / Morgan
SS8	Linnamäe / Morgan	Toyota GR Yaris Rally2	3:36.7	Linnamäe / Morgan
SS9	Pajari / Mälkönen	Toyota GR Yaris Rally2	9:25.8	Linnamäe / Morgan
SS10	Heikkilä / Temonen	Toyota GR Yaris Rally2	7:02.6	Linnamäe / Morgan
SS11	Solans / Sanjuan	Toyota GR Yaris Rally2	14:30.6	Pajari / Mälkönen
SS12	Pajari / Mälkönen	Toyota GR Yaris Rally2	9:16.1	Pajari / Mälkönen
SS13	Solans / Sanjuan	Toyota GR Yaris Rally2	7:06.2	Pajari / Mälkönen
SS14	Linnamäe / Morgan	Toyota GR Yaris Rally2	14:38.5	Pajari / Mälkönen
SS15	Linnamäe / Morgan	Toyota GR Yaris Rally2	6:17.0	Pajari / Mälkönen
SS16	Korhonen / Viinikka	Toyota GR Yaris Rally2	12:17.3	Pajari / Mälkönen
SS17	Pajari / Mälkönen	Toyota GR Yaris Rally2	12:05.9	Pajari / Mälkönen
SS18	Linnamäe / Morgan	Toyota GR Yaris Rally2	5:56.1	Pajari / Mälkönen

==== Championship standings ====
Pos.	Open Drivers' championships			Open Co-drivers' championships			Teams' championships			Challenger Drivers' championships			Challenger Co-drivers' championships		
Pos.	Move	Driver	Points	Move	Co-driver	Points	Move	Manufacturer	Points	Move	Manufacturer	Points	Move	Driver	Points
1		Yohan Rossel	25		Arnaud Dunand	25		DG Sport Compétition	43		Pepe López	25		David Vázquez Liste	25
2	New entry	Oliver Solberg	25	New entry	Elliott Edmondson	25	New entry	Toyota Gazoo Racing WRT NG	43	New entry	Sami Pajari	25	New entry	Enni Mälkönen	25
3	1	Pepe López	18	1	David Vázquez Liste	18				1	Nikolay Gryazin	18	1	Konstantin Aleksandrov	18
4	New entry	Sami Pajari	18	New entry	Enni Mälkönen	18				New entry	Georg Linnamäe	18	New entry	James Morgan	18
5	2	Nikolay Gryazin	15	2	Konstantin Aleksandrov	15				2	Nicolas Ciamin	15	2	Yannick Roche	15

=== WRC-3 Rally3 ===
==== Classification ====
Position		No.	Driver	Co-driver	Entrant	Car	Time	Difference	Points
Event	Class	No.	Driver	Co-driver	Entrant	Car	Time	Difference	Points
16	1	51	Mille Johansson	Johan Grönvall	Mille Johansson	Ford Fiesta Rally3	2:49:33.8	0.0	25
17	2	47	Romet Jürgenson	Siim Oja	FIA Rally Star	Ford Fiesta Rally3	2:50:22.7	+48.9	18
20	3	49	Eamonn Kelly	Conor Mohan	Motorsport Ireland Rally Academy	Ford Fiesta Rally3	2:53:34.6	+4:00.8	15
21	4	56	Raúl Hernández	José Murado González	Raúl Hernández	Ford Fiesta Rally3	2:54:03.0	+4:29.2	12
24	5	54	Tom Rensonnet	Loïc Dumont	RACB National Team	Ford Fiesta Rally3	2:56:33.9	+7:00.1	10
28	6	58	Petr Borodin	Roman Cheprasov	ASP Racing	Ford Fiesta Rally3	3:00:42.5	+11:08.7	8
30	7	55	Taylor Gill	Daniel Brkic	FIA Rally Star	Ford Fiesta Rally3	3:02:03.9	+12:30.1	6
31	8	46	Norbert Maior	Francesca Maria Maior	Norbert Maior	Ford Fiesta Rally3	3:02:04.5	+12:30.7	4
35	9	62	Max Smart	Cameron Fair	FIA Rally Star	Ford Fiesta Rally3	3:03:15.1	+13:41.3	2
37	10	53	Roberto Blach Núñez	Mauro Barreiro	Roberto Blach Núñez	Ford Fiesta Rally3	3:09:32.7	+19:58.9	1
38	11	44	Filip Kohn	Tom Woodburn	Filip Kohn	Ford Fiesta Rally3	3:12:04.1	+22:30.3	0
43	12	57	Nataniel Bruun	Pablo Olmos	Nataniel Bruun	Ford Fiesta Rally3	3:26:29.0	+36:55.2	0
49	13	50	Jakub Matulka	Daniel Dymurski	Jakub Matulka	Ford Fiesta Rally3	3:58:26.1	+1:08:52.3	0
Retired SS16		45	Diego Dominguez Jr.	Rogelio Peñate	Diego Dominguez Jr.	Ford Fiesta Rally3	Retired		0
Retired SS16		52	Fabio Schwarz	Bernhard Ettel	Armin Schwarz Driving Experience	Ford Fiesta Rally3	Retired		0
Retired SS14		61	Jose Abito Caparo	Esther Gutiérrez Porras	FIA Rally Star	Ford Fiesta Rally3	Retired		0
Retired SS13		43	Jan Černý	Ondřej Krajča	Jan Černý	Ford Fiesta Rally3	Mechanical		0
Did not start		48	Bruno Bulacia	Gabriel Morales	Bruno Bulacia	Ford Fiesta Rally3	Rolled on Shakedown		0

==== Special stages ====
Stage	Winners	Car	Time	Class leaders
SD	Johansson / Grönvall	Ford Fiesta Rally3	3:05.0	—N/a
SS1	Černý / Krajča	Ford Fiesta Rally3	3:37.7	Černý / Krajča
SS2	Johansson / Grönvall	Ford Fiesta Rally3	6:56.0	Černý / Krajča
SS3	Matulka / Dymurski	Ford Fiesta Rally3	6:33.5	Černý / Krajča
SS4	Johansson / Grönvall	Ford Fiesta Rally3	14:14.9	Černý / Krajča
SS5	Jürgenson / Oja	Ford Fiesta Rally3	7:12.5	Johansson / Grönvall
SS6	Johansson / Grönvall	Ford Fiesta Rally3	6:37.9	Johansson / Grönvall
SS7	Johansson / Grönvall	Ford Fiesta Rally3	14:34.6	Johansson / Grönvall
SS8	Kohn / Woodburn	Ford Fiesta Rally3	3:41.4	Johansson / Grönvall
SS9	Jürgenson / Oja	Ford Fiesta Rally3	10:01.6	Johansson / Grönvall
SS10	Dominguez Jr. / Peñate	Ford Fiesta Rally3	7:30.1	Johansson / Grönvall
SS11	Johansson / Grönvall	Ford Fiesta Rally3	15:19.7	Johansson / Grönvall
SS12	Dominguez Jr. / Peñate	Ford Fiesta Rally3	9:48.3	Johansson / Grönvall
SS13	Johansson / Grönvall	Ford Fiesta Rally3	7:27.6	Johansson / Grönvall
SS14	Jürgenson / Oja	Ford Fiesta Rally3	15:31.2	Johansson / Grönvall
SS15	Johansson / Grönvall	Ford Fiesta Rally3	6:34.6	Johansson / Grönvall
SS16	Johansson / Grönvall	Ford Fiesta Rally3	13:03.6	Johansson / Grönvall
SS17	Kohn / Woodburn	Ford Fiesta Rally3	12:57.7	Johansson / Grönvall
SS18	Smart / Fair	Ford Fiesta Rally3	6:15.5	Johansson / Grönvall

==== Championship standings ====
Pos.	Drivers' championships			Co-drivers' championships		
Pos.	Move	Driver	Points	Move	Co-driver	Points
1		Jan Černý	25		Ondřej Krajča	25
2	New entry	Mille Johansson	25	New entry	Johan Grönvall	25
3	1	Ghjuvanni Rossi	18	1	Kylian Sarmezan	18
4	New entry	Romet Jürgenson	18	New entry	Siim Oja	18
5	New entry	Eamonn Kelly	15	New entry	Conor Mohan	15

=== J-WRC Rally3 ===
==== Classification ====
Position		No.	Driver	Co-driver	Entrant	Car	Time	Difference	Points	
Event	Class	No.	Driver	Co-driver	Entrant	Car	Time	Difference	Class	Stage
16	1	51	Mille Johansson	Johan Grönvall	Mille Johansson	Ford Fiesta Rally3	2:49:33.8	0.0	25	8
17	2	47	Romet Jürgenson	Siim Oja	FIA Rally Star	Ford Fiesta Rally3	2:50:22.7	+48.9	18	3
20	3	49	Eamonn Kelly	Conor Mohan	Motorsport Ireland Rally Academy	Ford Fiesta Rally3	2:53:34.6	+4:00.8	15	0
21	4	56	Raúl Hernández	José Murado González	Raúl Hernández	Ford Fiesta Rally3	2:54:03.0	+4:29.2	12	1
24	5	54	Tom Rensonnet	Loïc Dumont	RACB National Team	Ford Fiesta Rally3	2:56:33.9	+7:00.1	10	0
27	6	60	Gerardo V. Rosselot	Marcelo Brizio	Gerardo V. Rosselot	Ford Fiesta Rally3	3:00:18.0	+10:44.2	8	1
28	7	58	Petr Borodin	Roman Cheprasov	ASP Racing	Ford Fiesta Rally3	3:00:42.5	+11:08.7	6	0
30	8	55	Taylor Gill	Daniel Brkic	FIA Rally Star	Ford Fiesta Rally3	3:02:03.9	+12:30.1	4	0
31	9	46	Norbert Maior	Francesca Maria Maior	Norbert Maior	Ford Fiesta Rally3	3:02:04.5	+12:30.7	2	1
35	10	62	Max Smart	Cameron Fair	FIA Rally Star	Ford Fiesta Rally3	3:03:15.1	+13:41.3	1	0
37	11	53	Roberto Blach Núñez	Mauro Barreiro	Roberto Blach Núñez	Ford Fiesta Rally3	3:09:32.7	+19:58.3	0	0
43	12	57	Nataniel Bruun	Pablo Olmos	Nataniel Bruun	Ford Fiesta Rally3	3:26:29.0	+36:55.2	0	0
47	13	63	Andre Martinez	Guillermo Sierra Ovalle	Andre Martinez	Ford Fiesta Rally3	3:35:30.0	+45:56.2	0	0
48	14	59	Abdullah Al-Rawahi	Ata Al-Hmoud	Abdullah Al-Rawahi	Ford Fiesta Rally3	3:46:50.8	+57:17.0	0	0
49	15	50	Jakub Matulka	Daniel Dymurski	Jakub Matulka	Ford Fiesta Rally3	3:58:26.1	+1:08:52.3	0	1
Retired SS16		45	Diego Dominguez Jr.	Rogelio Peñate	Diego Dominguez Jr.	Ford Fiesta Rally3	Retired		0	3
Retired SS16		52	Fabio Schwarz	Bernhard Ettel	Armin Schwarz Driving Experience	Ford Fiesta Rally3	Retired		0	0
Retired SS14		61	Jose Abito Caparo	Esther Gutiérrez Porras	FIA Rally Star	Ford Fiesta Rally3	Retired		0	0
Did not start		48	Bruno Bulacia	Gabriel Morales	Bruno Bulacia	Ford Fiesta Rally3	Rolled on shakedown		0	0

==== Special stages ====
Stage	Winners	Car	Time	Class leaders
SD	Johansson / Grönvall	Ford Fiesta Rally3	3:05.0	—N/a
SS1	Hernández / González	Ford Fiesta Rally3	3:39.6	Hernández / González
SS2	Johansson / Grönvall	Ford Fiesta Rally3	6:56.0	Gill / Brkic
SS3	Matulka / Dymurski	Ford Fiesta Rally3	6:33.5	Gill / Brkic
SS4	Johansson / Grönvall	Ford Fiesta Rally3	14:14.9	Schwarz / Ettel
SS5	Jürgenson / Oja	Ford Fiesta Rally3	7:12.5	Johansson / Grönvall
SS6	Johansson / Grönvall	Ford Fiesta Rally3	6:37.9	Johansson / Grönvall
SS7	Johansson / Grönvall	Ford Fiesta Rally3	14:34.6	Johansson / Grönvall
SS8	Dominguez Jr. / Peñate	Ford Fiesta Rally3	3:42.8	Johansson / Grönvall
SS9	Jürgenson / Oja	Ford Fiesta Rally3	10:01.6	Johansson / Grönvall
SS10	Dominguez Jr. / Peñate	Ford Fiesta Rally3	7:30.1	Johansson / Grönvall
SS11	Johansson / Grönvall	Ford Fiesta Rally3	15:19.7	Johansson / Grönvall
SS12	Dominguez Jr. / Peñate	Ford Fiesta Rally3	9:48.3	Johansson / Grönvall
SS13	Johansson / Grönvall	Ford Fiesta Rally3	7:27.6	Johansson / Grönvall
SS14	Jürgenson / Oja	Ford Fiesta Rally3	15:31.2	Johansson / Grönvall
SS15	Johansson / Grönvall	Ford Fiesta Rally3	6:34.6	Johansson / Grönvall
SS16	Johansson / Grönvall	Ford Fiesta Rally3	13:03.6	Johansson / Grönvall
SS17	Maior / Maior	Ford Fiesta Rally3	12:58.2	Johansson / Grönvall
SS18	Rosselot / Brizio	Ford Fiesta Rally3	6:14.6	Johansson / Grönvall

==== Championship standings ====
Pos.	Drivers' championships			Co-drivers' championships		
Pos.	Move	Driver	Points	Move	Co-driver	Points
1	New entry	Mille Johansson	33	New entry	Johan Grönvall	33
2	New entry	Romet Jürgenson	21	New entry	Siim Oja	21
3	New entry	Eamonn Kelly	15	New entry	Conor Mohan	15
4	New entry	Raúl Hernández	13	New entry	José Murado González	13
5	New entry	Tom Rensonnet	10	New entry	Loïc Dumont	10

== Notes ==
Previous rally: 2024 Monte Carlo Rally	2024 FIA World Rally Championship	Next rally: 2024 Safari Rally
Previous rally: 2023 Rally Sweden	2024 Rally Sweden	Next rally: 2025 Rally Sweden
