= 2025 Monte Carlo Rally =

93rd edition of the Monte Carlo Rally

2025 Monte Carlo Rally 93^{e} Rallye Automobile Monte-Carlo
Round 1 of 14 in the 2025 World Rally Championship
Next event →
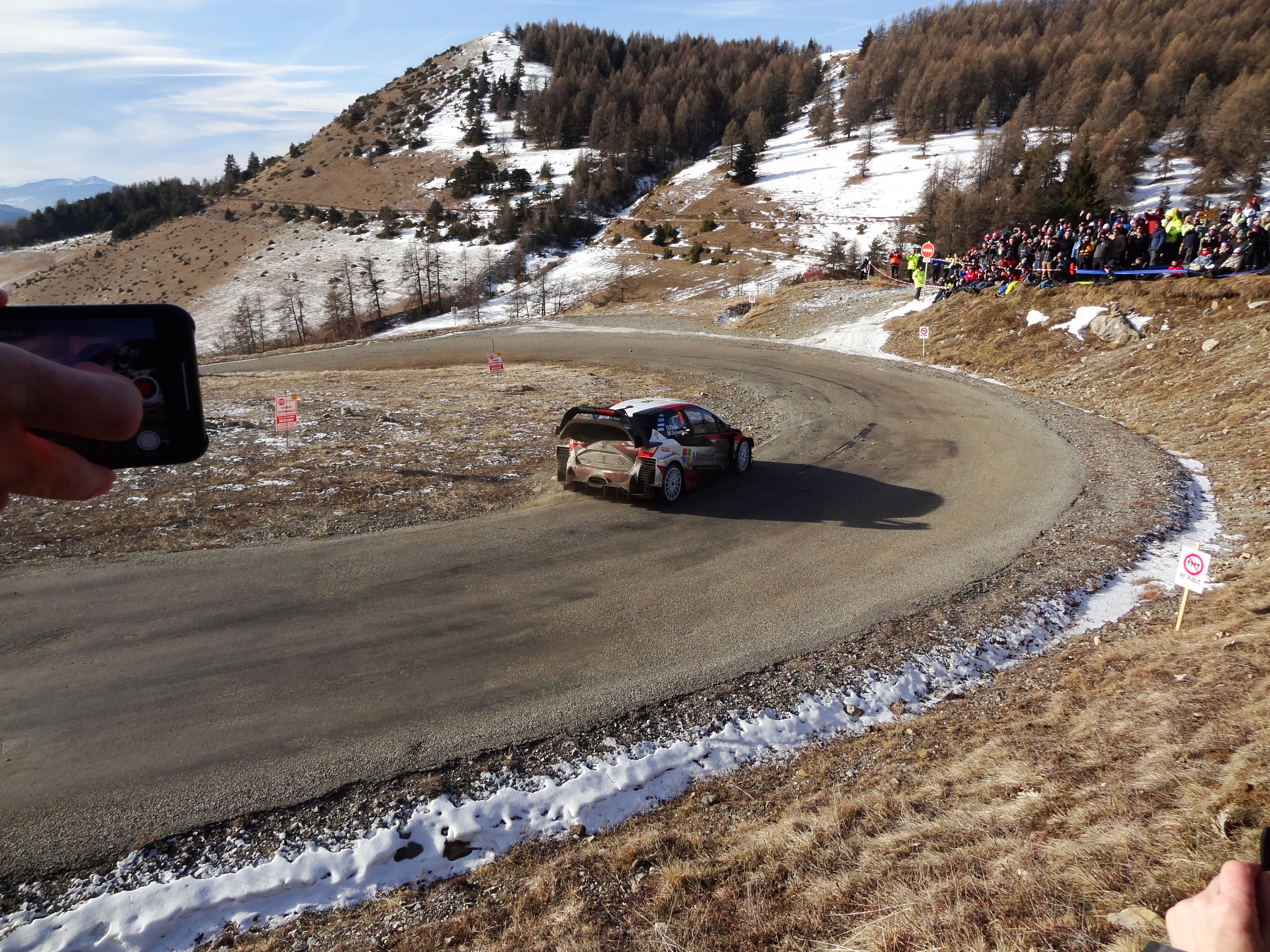
- The Monte Carlo Rally is run on a mixture of tarmac and snow stages.
- Host country: Monaco (Note: Although the rally was run in France, the Fédération Internationale de l'Automobile does not consider France to be the host nation.)
- Rally base: Gap, Provence-Alpes-Côte d'Azur, France
- Dates run: 23 – 26 January 2025
- Start location: Thoard, Provence-Alpes-Côte d'Azur, France
- Finish location: Col de Turini, Alpes-Maritimes, France
- Stages: 18 (343.80 km; 213.63 miles)
- Stage surface: Tarmac and snow
- Transport distance: 1,285.57 km (798.82 miles)
- Overall distance: 1,629.37 km (1,012.44 miles)

Statistics
- Crews registered: 70
- Crews: 69 at start, 62 at finish

Overall results
- Overall winner: (France) Sébastien Ogier (France) Vincent Landais (Japan) Toyota Gazoo Racing WRT; 3:19:06.1
- Sunday Accumulated leader: (United Kingdom) Elfyn Evans (United Kingdom) Scott Martin (Japan) Toyota Gazoo Racing WRT; 36:16.1
- Power Stage winner: (France) Sébastien Ogier (France) Vincent Landais (Japan) Toyota Gazoo Racing WRT; 12:58.5

Support category results
- WRC-2 winner: (France) Yohan Rossel (France) Arnaud Dunand (France) PH Sport; 3:29:32.9
- WRC-3 winner: (France) Arthur Pelamourges (France) Bastien Pouget; 3:44:44.9

The 2025 Monte Carlo Rally (also known as the 93^{e} Rallye Automobile Monte-Carlo) was a motor racing event for rally cars held over four days from 23 to 26 January 2025. It marked the ninety-third running of the Monte Carlo Rally, and was the opening round of the 2025 World Rally Championship, 2025 WRC2 Championship and 2025 WRC3 Championship. The 2025 event was based in Gap, Provence-Alpes-Côte d'Azur in France and consisted of eighteen special stages, covering a total competitive distance of 343.80 km (213.63 mi).

Thierry Neuville and Martijn Wydaeghe were the defending rally winners, and Hyundai Shell Mobis WRT were the manufacturer's winners. Yohan Rossel and Arnaud Dunand were the defending rally winners in the WRC2 championship. Jan Černý and Ondřej Krajča were the defending rally winners in the WRC3 championship.

Sébastien Ogier and Vincent Landais won the rally, and their team, Toyota Gazoo Racing WRT, were the manufacturer's winners. Rossel and Dunand successfully defended their titles in the WRC2 category. Arthur Pelamourges and Bastien Pouget were the winners in the WRC3 category.

== Background ==
=== Entry list ===
The following crews were entered into the rally. The event was opened to crews competing in the World Rally Championship, its support categories, the WRC2 Championship, the WRC3 Championship and privateer entries that were not registered to score points in any championship. Ten crews entered under Rally1 regulations, as were twenty-four Rally2 crews in the WRC2 Championship and eight Rally3 crews in the WRC3 Championship.

Rally1 entries competing in the World Rally Championship
No.	Driver	Co-Driver	Entrant	Car	Championship eligibility	Tyre
1	(Belgium) Thierry Neuville	(Belgium) Martijn Wydaeghe	(South Korea) Hyundai Shell Mobis WRT	Hyundai i20 N Rally1	Driver, Co-driver, Manufacturer	H
5	(Finland) Sami Pajari	(Finland) Marko Salminen	(Japan) Toyota Gazoo Racing WRT2	Toyota GR Yaris Rally1	Driver, Co-driver, Manufacturer, Team	H
8	(Estonia) Ott Tänak	(Estonia) Martin Järveoja	(South Korea) Hyundai Shell Mobis WRT	Hyundai i20 N Rally1	Driver, Co-driver, Manufacturer	H
13	(Luxembourg) Grégoire Munster	(Belgium) Louis Louka	(United Kingdom) M-Sport Ford WRT	Ford Puma Rally1	Driver, Co-driver, Manufacturer	H
16	(France) Adrien Fourmaux	(France) Alexandre Coria	(South Korea) Hyundai Shell Mobis WRT	Hyundai i20 N Rally1	Driver, Co-driver, Manufacturer	H
17	(France) Sébastien Ogier	(France) Vincent Landais	(Japan) Toyota Gazoo Racing WRT	Toyota GR Yaris Rally1	Driver, Co-driver, Manufacturer	H
18	(Japan) Takamoto Katsuta	(Republic of Ireland) Aaron Johnston	(Japan) Toyota Gazoo Racing WRT	Toyota GR Yaris Rally1	Driver, Co-driver	H
33	(United Kingdom) Elfyn Evans	(United Kingdom) Scott Martin	(Japan) Toyota Gazoo Racing WRT	Toyota GR Yaris Rally1	Driver, Co-driver, Manufacturer	H
55	(Republic of Ireland) Josh McErlean	(Republic of Ireland) Eoin Treacy	(United Kingdom) M-Sport Ford WRT	Ford Puma Rally1	Driver, Co-driver, Manufacturer	H
69	(Finland) Kalle Rovanperä	(Finland) Jonne Halttunen	(Japan) Toyota Gazoo Racing WRT	Toyota GR Yaris Rally1	Driver, Co-driver, Manufacturer	H

Rally2 entries competing in the WRC2 Championship
No.	Driver	Co-Driver	Entrant	Car	Championship eligibility	Tyre
22	(France) Yohan Rossel	(France) Arnaud Dunand	(France) PH Sport	Citroën C3 Rally2	Driver, Co-driver, Team	H
24	(Italy) Roberto Daprà	(Italy) Luca Guglielmetti	(Italy) Roberto Daprà	Škoda Fabia RS Rally2	Challenger Driver, Challenger Co-driver	H
25	(Luxembourg) Charles Munster	(France) Loris Pascaud	(Luxembourg) Charles Munster	Hyundai i20 N Rally2	Challenger Driver, Challenger Co-driver	H
27	(Switzerland) Olivier Burri	(France) Anderson Levratti	(Switzerland) Olivier Burri	Škoda Fabia Rally2 evo	Challenger Driver, Challenger Co-driver	H
28	(Belgium) Maxime Potty	(Belgium) Renaud Herman	(Belgium) Maxime Potty	Škoda Fabia RS Rally2	Challenger Driver, Challenger Co-driver	H
29	(Republic of Ireland) Eamonn Boland	(Republic of Ireland) Michael Joseph Morrissey	(Republic of Ireland) Eamonn Boland	Ford Fiesta Rally2	Challenger/Masters Driver, Challenger/Masters Co-driver	H
31	(France) Eric Camilli	(France) Thibault de la Haye	(France) Eric Camilli	Hyundai i20 N Rally2	Driver, Co-driver	H
32	(France) Matthieu Margaillan	(France) Mathilde Margaillan	(France) Matthieu Margaillan	Škoda Fabia RS Rally2	Challenger Driver, Challenger Co-driver	H
34	(France) Léo Rossel	(France) Guillaume Mercoiret	(France) PH Sport	Citroën C3 Rally2	Challenger Driver, Challenger Co-driver, Team	H
35	(Italy) Alberto Roveta	(Italy) Nicolò Gonella	(Italy) Alberto Roveta	Škoda Fabia RS Rally2	Challenger Driver, Challenger Co-driver	H
36	(Italy) Flavio Brega	(Italy) Marco Zegna	(Italy) Flavio Brega	Škoda Fabia RS Rally2	Challenger Driver, Challenger Co-driver	H
37	(Czech Republic) Jan Černý	(Czech Republic) Ondřej Krajča	(Czech Republic) Jan Černý	Citroën C3 Rally2	Challenger Driver, Challenger Co-driver	H
38	(Czech Republic) Filip Kohn	(United Kingdom) Ross Whittock	(Czech Republic) Filip Kohn	Škoda Fabia RS Rally2	Challenger Driver, Challenger Co-driver	H
39	(France) Pablo Sarrazin	(France) Geoffrey Combe	(Italy) Sarrazin Motorsport – Iron Lynx	Citroën C3 Rally2	Challenger Driver, Challenger Co-driver, Team	H
42	(France) Sarah Rumeau	(France) Julie Amblard	(Italy) Sarrazin Motorsport – Iron Lynx	Citroën C3 Rally2	Challenger Driver, Challenger Co-driver, Team	H
43	(Switzerland) Jonathan Michellod	(Switzerland) Stéphane Fellay	(Switzerland) Jonathan Michellod	Škoda Fabia R5	Challenger Driver, Challenger Co-driver	H
44	(Italy) Rachele Somaschini	(Italy) Nicola Arena	(Italy) Rachele Somaschini	Citroën C3 Rally2	Challenger Driver, Challenger Co-driver	H
45	(Switzerland) Daniel Guex	(France) Christopher Guieu	(Switzerland) Daniel Guex	Hyundai i20 N Rally2	Challenger Driver, Challenger Co-driver	H
46	(Italy) Enrico Brazzoli	(Italy) Martina Musiari	(Italy) Enrico Brazzoli	Škoda Fabia RS Rally2	Challenger/Masters Driver, Challenger Co-driver	H
47	(Italy) Maurizio Chiarani	(Italy) Flavio Zanella	(Italy) Maurizio Chiarani	Škoda Fabia RS Rally2	Challenger/Masters Driver, Challenger/Masters Co-driver	H
48	(Italy) Filippo Marchino	(Italy) Pietro Elia Ometto	(Italy) Filippo Marchino	Škoda Fabia Rally2 evo	Challenger Driver, Challenger Co-driver	H
49	(Netherlands) Henk Vossen	(Netherlands) Harmen Scholtalbers	(Netherlands) Henk Vossen	Hyundai i20 N Rally2	Challenger/Masters Driver, Challenger/Masters Co-driver	H

Rally3 entries competing in the WRC3 Championship
No.	Driver	Co-Driver	Entrant	Car	Tyre
50	(Paraguay) Diego Dominguez Jr.	(Spain) Rogelio Peñate	(Paraguay) Diego Dominguez Jr.	Ford Fiesta Rally3	H
51	(France) Mattéo Chatillon	(France) Maxence Cornuau	(France) Mattéo Chatillon	Renault Clio Rally3	H
52	(France) Ghjuvanni Rossi	(France) Kylian Sarmezan	(France) Ghjuvanni Rossi	Ford Fiesta Rally3	H
53	(Croatia) Slaven Šekuljica	(Croatia) Damir Petrović	(Croatia) Slaven Šekuljica	Ford Fiesta Rally3	H
54	(Italy) Matteo Fontana	(Italy) Alessandro Arnaboldi	(Italy) Matteo Fontana	Ford Fiesta Rally3	H
56	(France) Arthur Pelamourges	(France) Bastien Pouget	(France) Arthur Pelamourges	Renault Clio Rally3	H
57	(France) Yanis Desangles	(France) Nicolas Théron	(France) Yanis Desangles	Renault Clio Rally3	H
58	(France) Eric Royère	(France) Alexis Grenier	(France) Eric Royère	Renault Clio Rally3	H

Other major entries
No.	Driver	Co-Driver	Entrant	Car	Tyre
20	(Sweden) Oliver Solberg	(United Kingdom) Elliott Edmondson	(Finland) Printsport	Toyota GR Yaris Rally2	H
21	(Bulgaria) Nikolay Gryazin	(Kyrgyzstan) Konstantin Aleksandrov	(Bulgaria) Nikolay Gryazin	Škoda Fabia RS Rally2	H
22	(United Kingdom) Gus Greensmith	(Sweden) Jonas Andersson	(United Kingdom) Gus Greensmith	Škoda Fabia RS Rally2	H
26	(Japan) Hikaru Kogure	(Finland) Topi Matias Luhtinen	(Japan) Toyota Gazoo Racing WRT NG	Toyota GR Yaris Rally2	H
30	(Japan) Yuki Yamamoto	(Republic of Ireland) James Fulton	(Japan) Toyota Gazoo Racing WRT NG	Toyota GR Yaris Rally2	H

=== Itinerary ===
All dates and times are CET (UTC+1).

Date	No.	Time span	Stage name	Distance
22 January	—N/a	After 16:01	Route de la Garde [Shakedown]	3.28 km
23 January		After 14:30	Opening ceremony, Casino Square	—N/a
23 January		17:15 – 17:30	Tyre fitting zone, Digne-les-Bains	—N/a
23 January	SS1	After 18:05	Digne-les-Bains / Chaudon-Norante 1	19.01 km
23 January	SS2	After 19:53	Faucon-du-Caire / Bréziers	21.18 km
23 January	SS3	After 21:06	Avançon / Notre-Dame-du-Laus 1	13.97 km
23 January		22:06 – 22:54	Flexi service A, Gap	—N/a
24 January		8:00 – 8:18	Service B, Gap	—N/a
24 January	SS4	After 9:31	Saint-Maurice / Aubessagne 1	18.68 km
24 January	SS5	After 10:34	Saint-Léger-les-Mélèzes / La Bâtie-Neuve 1	16.68 km
24 January	SS6	After 11:42	La Bréole / Selonnet 1	18.31 km
24 January		13:27 – 14:10	Service C, Gap	—N/a
24 January	SS7	After 15:23	Saint-Maurice / Aubessagne 2	18.68 km
24 January	SS8	After 16:26	Saint-Léger-les-Mélèzes / La Bâtie-Neuve 2	16.68 km
24 January	SS9	After 17:34	La Bréole / Selonnet 2	18.31 km
24 January		18:59 – 19:47	Flexi service D, Gap	—N/a
25 January		6:58 – 7:16	Service E, Gap	—N/a
25 January	SS10	After 8:59	La Motte-Chalancon / Saint-Nazaire 1	27.00 km
25 January	SS11	After 10:05	Aucelon / Recoubeau-Jansac 1	20.85 km
25 January	SS12	After 11:08	La Bâtie-des-Fonts / Aspremont 1	17.85 km
25 January		12:33 – 13:16	Service F, Gap	—N/a
25 January	SS13	After 14:59	La Motte-Chalancon / Saint-Nazaire 2	27.00 km
25 January	SS14	After 16:05	Aucelon / Recoubeau-Jansac 2	20.85 km
25 January	SS15	After 17:08	La Bâtie-des-Fonts / Aspremont 2	17.85 km
25 January		18:33 – 19:21	Flexi service G, Gap	—N/a
26 January		6:03 – 6:21	Service H, Gap	—N/a
26 January	SS16	After 6:39	Avançon / Notre-Dame-du-Laus 2	13.97 km
26 January	SS17	After 8:32	Digne-les-Bains / Chaudon-Norante 2	19.01 km
26 January	SS18	After 12:15	La Bollène-Vésubie / Peïra-Cava [Power Stage]	17.92 km
26 January		After 16:15	Podium ceremony, Casino Square	—N/a

== Report ==
=== WRC Rally1 ===
==== Classification ====
Position		No.	Driver	Co-driver	Entrant	Car	Time	Difference	Points			
Event	Class	No.	Driver	Co-driver	Entrant	Car	Time	Difference	Event	Sunday	Stage	Total
1	1	17	Sébastien Ogier	Vincent Landais	Toyota Gazoo Racing WRT	Toyota GR Yaris Rally1	3:19:06.1	0.0	25	3	5	33
2	2	33	Elfyn Evans	Scott Martin	Toyota Gazoo Racing WRT	Toyota GR Yaris Rally1	3:19:24.6	+18.5	17	5	4	26
3	3	16	Adrien Fourmaux	Alexandre Coria	Hyundai Shell Mobis WRT	Hyundai i20 N Rally1	3:19:32.1	+26.0	15	2	3	20
4	4	69	Kalle Rovanperä	Jonne Halttunen	Toyota Gazoo Racing WRT	Toyota GR Yaris Rally1	3:20:00.4	+54.3	12	4	2	18
5	5	8	Ott Tänak	Martin Järveoja	Hyundai Shell Mobis WRT	Hyundai i20 N Rally1	3:20:05.1	+59.0	10	0	1	11
6	6	1	Thierry Neuville	Martijn Wydaeghe	Hyundai Shell Mobis WRT	Hyundai i20 N Rally1	3:24:50.3	+5:44.2	8	1	0	9
7	7	55	Josh McErlean	Eoin Treacy	M-Sport Ford WRT	Ford Puma Rally1	3:29:21.2	+10:15.1	6	0	0	6
Retired SS17		13	Grégoire Munster	Louis Louka	M-Sport Ford WRT	Ford Puma Rally1	Accident		0	0	0	0
Retired SS16		5	Sami Pajari	Marko Salminen	Toyota Gazoo Racing WRT2	Toyota GR Yaris Rally1	Accident		0	0	0	0
Retired SS16		18	Takamoto Katsuta	Aaron Johnston	Toyota Gazoo Racing WRT	Toyota GR Yaris Rally1	Off road		0	0	0	0

==== Special stages ====
Stage	Winners	Car	Time	Class leaders
SD	Tänak / Järveoja	Hyundai i20 N Rally1	2:09.8	—N/a
SS1	Ogier / Landais	Toyota GR Yaris Rally1	11:30.4	Ogier / Landais
SS2	Ogier / Landais	Toyota GR Yaris Rally1	11:11.4	Ogier / Landais
SS3	Evans / Martin	Toyota GR Yaris Rally1	10:06.3	Neuville / Wydaeghe
SS4	Rovanperä / Halttunen	Toyota GR Yaris Rally1	11:38.3	Evans / Martin
SS5	Stage cancelled			
SS6	Fourmaux / Coria	Hyundai i20 N Rally1	11:00.8	Evans / Martin
SS7	Evans / Martin	Toyota GR Yaris Rally1	10:35.6	Evans / Martin
SS8	Ogier / Landais	Toyota GR Yaris Rally1	9:31.7	Ogier / Landais
SS9	Ogier / Landais	Toyota GR Yaris Rally1	10:35.6	Ogier / Landais
SS10	Munster / Louka	Ford Puma Rally1	16:28.6	Ogier / Landais
SS11	Tänak / Järveoja	Hyundai i20 N Rally1	10:36.9	Ogier / Landais
SS12	Katsuta / Johnston	Toyota GR Yaris Rally1	10:37.6	Ogier / Landais
SS13	Tänak / Järveoja	Hyundai i20 N Rally1	16:07.9	Ogier / Landais
SS14	Tänak / Järveoja	Hyundai i20 N Rally1	10:39.6	Ogier / Landais
SS15	Tänak / Järveoja	Hyundai i20 N Rally1	10:41.5	Ogier / Landais
SS16	Ogier / Landais	Toyota GR Yaris Rally1	10:50.0	Ogier / Landais
SS17	Fourmaux / Coria	Hyundai i20 N Rally1	12:05.5	Ogier / Landais
SS18	Ogier / Landais	Toyota GR Yaris Rally1	12:58.6	Ogier / Landais

==== Championship standings ====
Drivers' Standings
Move	Pos.	Driver	Points
New entry	1	Sébastien Ogier	33
New entry	2	Elfyn Evans	26
New entry	3	Adrien Fourmaux	20
New entry	4	Kalle Rovanperä	18
New entry	5	Ott Tänak	11

Co-drivers' Standings
Move	Pos.	Driver	Points
New entry	1	Vincent Landais	33
New entry	2	Scott Martin	26
New entry	3	Alexandre Coria	20
New entry	4	Jonne Halttunen	18
New entry	5	Martin Järveoja	11

Manufacturers' Standings
Move	Pos.	Driver	Points
New entry	1	Toyota Gazoo Racing WRT	60
New entry	2	Hyundai Shell Mobis WRT	36
New entry	3	M-Sport Ford WRT	11

=== WRC2 Rally2 ===
==== Classification ====
Position		No.	Driver	Co-driver	Entrant	Car	Time	Difference	Points	
Event	Class	No.	Driver	Co-driver	Entrant	Car	Time	Difference	Class	Event
8	1	22	Yohan Rossel	Arnaud Dunand	PH Sport	Citroën C3 Rally2	3:29:32.9	0.0	25	4
9	2	31	Eric Camilli	Thibault de la Haye	Eric Camilli	Hyundai i20 N Rally2	3:32:20.7	+2:47.8	17	2
10	3	34	Léo Rossel	Guillaume Mercoiret	PH Sport	Citroën C3 Rally2	3:32:26.8	+2:53.9	15	1
13	4	37	Jan Černý	Ondřej Krajča	Jan Černý	Citroën C3 Rally2	3:36:06.9	+6:34.0	12	0
14	5	24	Roberto Daprà	Luca Guglielmetti	Roberto Daprà	Škoda Fabia RS Rally2	3:36:33.8	+7:00.9	10	0
16	6	39	Pablo Sarrazin	Geoffrey Combe	Sarrazin Motorsport – Iron Lynx	Citroën C3 Rally2	3:42:53.8	+13:20.9	8	0
18	7	25	Charles Munster	Loris Pascaud	Charles Munster	Hyundai i20 N Rally2	3:43:49.5	+14:16.6	6	0
19	8	28	Maxime Potty	Renaud Herman	Maxime Potty	Škoda Fabia RS Rally2	3:44:33.3	+15:00.4	4	0
20	9	42	Sarah Rumeau	Julie Amblard	Sarrazin Motorsport – Iron Lynx	Citroën C3 Rally2	3:44:41.1	+15:08.2	2	0
23	10	38	Filip Kohn	Ross Whittock	Filip Kohn	Škoda Fabia RS Rally2	3:48:20.2	+18:47.3	1	0
24	11	27	Olivier Burri	Anderson Levratti	Olivier Burri	Škoda Fabia Rally2 evo	3:48:36.6	+19:03.7	0	0
27	12	43	Jonathan Michellod	Stéphane Fellay	Jonathan Michellod	Škoda Fabia R5	3:54:55.7	+25:22.8	0	0
35	13	47	Maurizio Chiarani	Flavio Zanella	Maurizio Chiarani	Škoda Fabia RS Rally2	4:06:27.4	+36:54.5	0	0
38	14	36	Flavio Brega	Marco Zegna	Flavio Brega	Škoda Fabia RS Rally2	4:08:48.1	+39:15.2	0	0
39	15	46	Enrico Brazzoli	Martina Musiari	Enrico Brazzoli	Škoda Fabia RS Rally2	4:08:56.4	+39:23.5	0	0
43	16	29	Eamonn Boland	Michael Joseph Morrissey	Eamonn Boland	Ford Fiesta Rally2	4:12:13.5	+42:40.6	0	0
53	17	45	Daniel Guex	Christopher Guieu	Daniel Guex	Hyundai i20 N Rally2	4:25:12.9	+55:40.0	0	0
57	18	44	Rachele Somaschini	Nicola Arena	Rachele Somaschini	Citroën C3 Rally2	4:49:09.3	+1:19:36.4	0	0
59	19	48	Filippo Marchino	Pietro Elia Ometto	Filippo Marchino	Škoda Fabia Rally2 evo	4:54:48.3	+1:25:15.4	0	0
62	20	49	Henk Vossen	Harmen Scholtalbers	Henk Vossen	Hyundai i20 N Rally2	5:08:41.0	+1:39:08.1	0	0
Retired SS2		35	Alberto Roveta	Nicolò Gonella	Alberto Roveta	Škoda Fabia RS Rally2	Accident		0	0
Did not start		32	Matthieu Margaillan	Mathilde Margaillan	Matthieu Margaillan	Škoda Fabia RS Rally2	Shakedown accident		0	0

==== Special stages ====
Overall
Stage	Winners	Car	Time	Class leaders
SD	Y. Rossel / Dunand	Citroën C3 Rally2	2:21.3	—N/a
SS1	Y. Rossel / Dunand	Citroën C3 Rally2	12:24.5	Y. Rossel / Dunand
SS2	Y. Rossel / Dunand	Citroën C3 Rally2	12:02.7	Y. Rossel / Dunand
SS3	Y. Rossel / Dunand	Citroën C3 Rally2	10:55.5	Y. Rossel / Dunand
SS4	Y. Rossel / Dunand	Citroën C3 Rally2	12:04.4	Y. Rossel / Dunand
SS5	Stage cancelled			
SS6	Y. Rossel / Dunand	Citroën C3 Rally2	11:34.7	Y. Rossel / Dunand
SS7	Y. Rossel / Dunand	Citroën C3 Rally2	11:19.7	Y. Rossel / Dunand
SS8	Y. Rossel / Dunand	Citroën C3 Rally2	10:25.7	Y. Rossel / Dunand
SS9	Y. Rossel / Dunand	Citroën C3 Rally2	11:17.4	Y. Rossel / Dunand
SS10	Y. Rossel / Dunand	Citroën C3 Rally2	17:16.3	Y. Rossel / Dunand
SS11	Y. Rossel / Dunand	Citroën C3 Rally2	11:13.1	Y. Rossel / Dunand
SS12	Y. Rossel / Dunand	Citroën C3 Rally2	11:14.5	Y. Rossel / Dunand
SS13	Y. Rossel / Dunand	Citroën C3 Rally2	17:02.8	Y. Rossel / Dunand
SS14	Y. Rossel / Dunand	Citroën C3 Rally2	11:15.7	Y. Rossel / Dunand
SS15	Y. Rossel / Dunand	Citroën C3 Rally2	11:19.0	Y. Rossel / Dunand
SS16	Camilli / de la Haye	Hyundai i20 N Rally2	11:08.1	Y. Rossel / Dunand
SS17	L. Rossel / Mercoiret	Citroën C3 Rally2	13:06.7	Y. Rossel / Dunand
SS18	Y. Rossel / Dunand	Citroën C3 Rally2	13:26.5	Y. Rossel / Dunand

Challenger
Stage	Winners	Car	Time	Class leaders
SD	Potty / Herman	Škoda Fabia RS Rally2	2:22.1	—N/a
SS1	L. Rossel / Mercoiret	Citroën C3 Rally2	12:29.4	L. Rossel / Mercoiret
SS2	L. Rossel / Mercoiret	Citroën C3 Rally2	12:23.9	L. Rossel / Mercoiret
SS3	Stage cancelled			
SS4	Černý / Krajča	Citroën C3 Rally2	12:08.8	L. Rossel / Mercoiret
SS5	Stage cancelled			
SS6	L. Rossel / Mercoiret	Citroën C3 Rally2	11:52.0	L. Rossel / Mercoiret
SS7	Černý / Krajča	Citroën C3 Rally2	11:38.8	L. Rossel / Mercoiret
SS8	L. Rossel / Mercoiret	Citroën C3 Rally2	10:41.9	L. Rossel / Mercoiret
SS9	Černý / Krajča	Citroën C3 Rally2	11:46.3	L. Rossel / Mercoiret
SS10	L. Rossel / Mercoiret	Citroën C3 Rally2	17:19.5	L. Rossel / Mercoiret
SS11	L. Rossel / Mercoiret	Citroën C3 Rally2	11:23.5	L. Rossel / Mercoiret
SS12	L. Rossel / Mercoiret	Citroën C3 Rally2	11:19.9	L. Rossel / Mercoiret
SS13	Černý / Krajča	Citroën C3 Rally2	17:08.1	L. Rossel / Mercoiret
SS14	L. Rossel / Mercoiret	Citroën C3 Rally2	11:19.9	L. Rossel / Mercoiret
SS15	L. Rossel / Mercoiret	Citroën C3 Rally2	11:20.7	L. Rossel / Mercoiret
SS16	L. Rossel / Mercoiret	Citroën C3 Rally2	11:24.5	L. Rossel / Mercoiret
SS17	L. Rossel / Mercoiret	Citroën C3 Rally2	13:06.7	L. Rossel / Mercoiret
SS18	L. Rossel / Mercoiret	Citroën C3 Rally2	13:40.0	L. Rossel / Mercoiret

==== Championship standings ====
Drivers' Standings
Move	Pos.	Driver	Points
New entry	1	Yohan Rossel	25
New entry	2	Eric Camilli	17
New entry	3	Léo Rossel	15
New entry	4	Jan Černý	12
New entry	5	Roberto Daprà	10

Co-drivers' Standings
Move	Pos.	Driver	Points
New entry	1	Arnaud Dunand	25
New entry	2	Thibault de la Haye	17
New entry	3	Guillaume Mercoiret	15
New entry	4	Ondřej Krajča	12
New entry	5	Luca Guglielmetti	10

Manufacturers' Standings
Move	Pos.	Driver	Points
New entry	1	PH Sport	42
New entry	2	Sarrazin Motorsport – Iron Lynx	27

Challenger Drivers' Standings
Move	Pos.	Driver	Points
New entry	1	Léo Rossel	25
New entry	2	Jan Černý	17
New entry	3	Roberto Daprà	15
New entry	4	Pablo Sarrazin	12
New entry	5	Charles Munster	10

Challenger Co-drivers' Standings
Move	Pos.	Driver	Points
New entry	1	Guillaume Mercoiret	25
New entry	2	Ondřej Krajča	17
New entry	3	Luca Guglielmetti	15
New entry	4	Geoffrey Combe	12
New entry	5	Loris Pascaud	10

=== WRC3 Rally3 ===
==== Classification ====
Position		No.	Driver	Co-driver	Entrant	Car	Time	Difference	Points
Event	Class	No.	Driver	Co-driver	Entrant	Car	Time	Difference	Points
21	1	56	Arthur Pelamourges	Bastien Pouget	Arthur Pelamourges	Renault Clio Rally3	3:44:44.9	0.0	25
25	2	54	Matteo Fontana	Alessandro Arnaboldi	Matteo Fontana	Ford Fiesta Rally3	3:49:47.6	+5:02.7	17
26	3	52	Ghjuvanni Rossi	Kylian Sarmezan	Ghjuvanni Rossi	Ford Fiesta Rally3	3:50:56.0	+6:11.1	15
30	4	50	Diego Dominguez Jr.	Rogelio Peñate	Diego Dominguez Jr.	Ford Fiesta Rally3	3:58:26.0	+13:41.1	12
45	5	57	Yanis Desangles	Nicolas Théron	Yanis Desangles	Renault Clio Rally3	4:16:25.7	+31:40.8	10
46	6	58	Eric Royère	Alexis Grenier	Eric Royère	Renault Clio Rally3	4:17:55.0	+33:10.1	8
60	7	53	Slaven Šekuljica	Damir Petrović	Slaven Šekuljica	Ford Fiesta Rally3	5:02:47.2	+1:18:02.3	6
Retired SS4		51	Mattéo Chatillon	Maxence Cornuau	Mattéo Chatillon	Renault Clio Rally3	Rolled		0

==== Special stages ====
Stage	Winners	Car	Time	Class leaders
SD	Pelamourges / Pouget	Renault Clio Rally3	2:24.8	—N/a
SS1	Pelamourges / Pouget	Renault Clio Rally3	13:26.0	Pelamourges / Pouget
SS2	Rossi / Sarmezan	Ford Fiesta Rally3	13:16.9	Rossi / Sarmezan
SS3	Stage cancelled			
SS4	Pelamourges / Pouget	Renault Clio Rally3	12:22.3	Pelamourges / Pouget
SS5	Stage cancelled			
SS6	Pelamourges / Pouget	Renault Clio Rally3	12:22.5	Pelamourges / Pouget
SS7	Pelamourges / Pouget	Renault Clio Rally3	12:09.7	Pelamourges / Pouget
SS8	Pelamourges / Pouget	Renault Clio Rally3	11:22.5	Pelamourges / Pouget
SS9	Pelamourges / Pouget	Renault Clio Rally3	12:37.1	Pelamourges / Pouget
SS10	Stage cancelled			
SS11	Pelamourges / Pouget	Renault Clio Rally3	11:57.7	Pelamourges / Pouget
SS12	Fontana / Arnaboldi	Ford Fiesta Rally3	12:12.3	Pelamourges / Pouget
SS13	Pelamourges / Pouget	Renault Clio Rally3	17:57.3	Pelamourges / Pouget
SS14	Pelamourges / Pouget	Renault Clio Rally3	12:00.6	Pelamourges / Pouget
SS15	Pelamourges / Pouget	Renault Clio Rally3	12:23.5	Pelamourges / Pouget
SS16	Pelamourges / Pouget	Renault Clio Rally3	12:17.7	Pelamourges / Pouget
SS17	Pelamourges / Pouget	Renault Clio Rally3	14:14.2	Pelamourges / Pouget
SS18	Pelamourges / Pouget	Renault Clio Rally3	14:10.9	Pelamourges / Pouget

==== Championship standings ====
Drivers' Standings
Move	Pos.	Driver	Points
New entry	1	Arthur Pelamourges	25
New entry	2	Matteo Fontana	17
New entry	3	Ghjuvanni Rossi	15
New entry	4	Diego Dominguez Jr.	12
New entry	5	Yanis Desangles	10

Co-drivers' Standings
Move	Pos.	Driver	Points
New entry	1	Bastien Pouget	25
New entry	2	Alessandro Arnaboldi	17
New entry	3	Kylian Sarmezan	15
New entry	4	Rogelio Peñate	12
New entry	5	Nicolas Théron	10

== Notes ==
Previous rally: 2024 Rally Japan (2024)	2025 FIA World Rally Championship	Next rally: 2025 Rally Sweden
Previous rally: 2024 Monte Carlo Rally	2025 Monte Carlo Rally	Next rally: 2026 Monte Carlo Rally
