= Hyundai i20 N Rally1 =

Hyundai Rally1 rally car

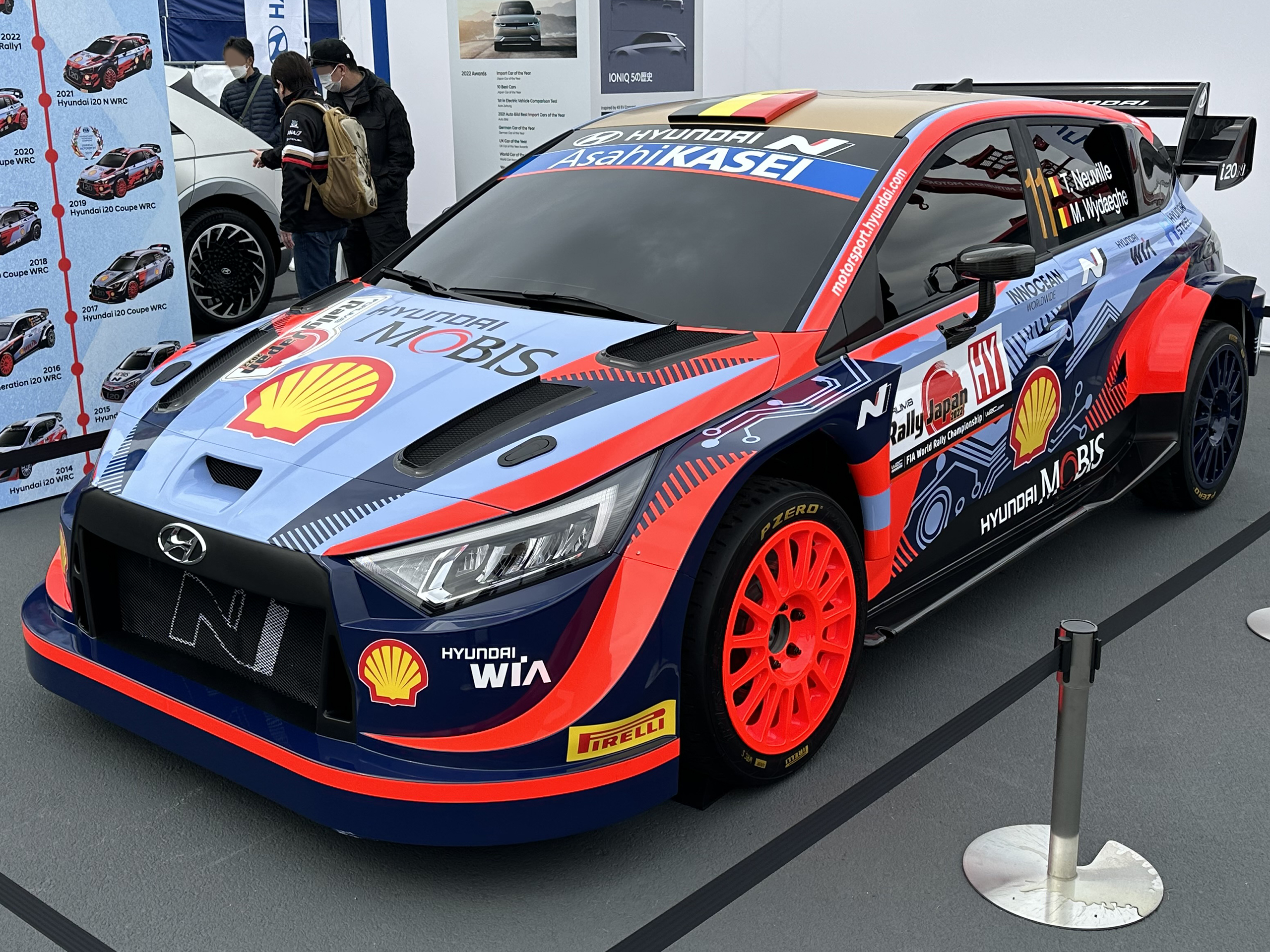
- Category: Rally1
- Constructor: Hyundai
- Designer: Stefano Sangiorgi
- Predecessor: Hyundai i20 Coupe WRC

Technical specifications
- Chassis: Tubular spaceframe with FIA safety cell
- Suspension: MacPherson strut
- Length: 4,100 mm
- Width: 1,875 mm
- Axle track: 1,665 mm
- Wheelbase: 2,630 mm
- Engine: Hyundai Motorsport Global Race Engine 1,600 cc (98 cu in) I4 386 PS turbocharged direct injection with a 100 kW electric motor and 3.9 kWh plug in hybrid battery
- Transmission: Five-speed semi-automatic transmission Mechanical front and rear
- Weight: 1,180 kg (1,260 with hybrid unit)
- Fuel: TotalEnergies WRC-spec sustainable fossil-free fuel
- Lubricants: Shell Helix-Ultra
- Brakes: 300-370 mm ventilated disc brakes and air cooled 4-piston callipers
- Tyres: 2022–2024: Pirelli P Zero (for tarmac); Pirelli Cinturato (for wet tarmac); Pirelli Sottozero (for ice/snow); Pirelli Scorpion (for gravel, clay and rest of dirt-type surfaces); 2025–present: Hankook
- Clutch: Cerametallic twin-disk

Competition history (WRC)
- Notable entrants: (South Korea) Hyundai Shell Mobis WRT
- Notable drivers: (Republic of Ireland) Craig Breen; (France) Adrien Fourmaux; (Finland) Esapekka Lappi; (Norway) Andreas Mikkelsen; (Belgium) Thierry Neuville; (Spain) Dani Sordo; (Sweden) Oliver Solberg; (Estonia) Ott Tänak
- Debut: (Monaco) 2022 Monte Carlo Rally
- First win: (Italy) 2022 Rally Italia Sardegna
- Last win: 2025 Rally Saudi Arabia
- Last event: 2025 Rally Saudi Arabia
| Races | Wins | Podiums |
|---|---|---|
| 49 | 15 | 57 |
- Constructors' Championships: 0
- Drivers' Championships: 1 (2024)

The Hyundai i20 N Rally1 is a Rally1 car built by the Hyundai Motorsport that is driven in the World Rally Championship starting in 2022. The prototype car is based on the Hyundai i20 N production car and was first revealed to public during testing in the south of France in May 2021.

== World Rally Championship results ==
=== Championship titles ===
| Year | Title | Competitor | Entries | Wins | Podiums | Points |
|---|---|---|---|---|---|---|
| 2024 | FIA World Rally Championship for Drivers | (Belgium) Thierry Neuville | 13 | 2 | 6 | 242 |
| 2024 | FIA World Rally Championship for Co-Drivers | (Belgium) Martijn Wydaeghe | 13 | 2 | 6 | 242 |

=== WRC victories ===
| Year | No. | Event | Surface | Driver | Co-driver | Entrant | Ref. |
|---|---|---|---|---|---|---|---|
| 2022 | 1 | (Italy) 2022 Rally Italia Sardegna | Gravel | (Estonia) Ott Tänak | (Estonia) Martin Järveoja | (South Korea) Hyundai Shell Mobis WRT | |
| 2022 | 2 | 2022 Rally Finland | Gravel | (Estonia) Ott Tänak | (Estonia) Martin Järveoja | (South Korea) Hyundai Shell Mobis WRT | |
| 2022 | 3 | (Belgium) 2022 Ypres Rally | Tarmac | (Estonia) Ott Tänak | (Estonia) Martin Järveoja | (South Korea) Hyundai Shell Mobis WRT | |
| 2022 | 4 | (Greece) 2022 Acropolis Rally | Gravel | (Belgium) Thierry Neuville | (Belgium) Martijn Wydaeghe | (South Korea) Hyundai Shell Mobis WRT | |
| 2022 | 5 | 2022 Rally Japan | Tarmac | (Belgium) Thierry Neuville | (Belgium) Martijn Wydaeghe | (South Korea) Hyundai Shell Mobis WRT | |
| 2023 | 6 | (Italy) 2023 Rally Italia Sardegna | Gravel | (Belgium) Thierry Neuville | (Belgium) Martijn Wydaeghe | (South Korea) Hyundai Shell Mobis WRT | |
| 2023 | 7 | (Europe) 2023 Central European Rally | Tarmac | (Belgium) Thierry Neuville | (Belgium) Martijn Wydaeghe | (South Korea) Hyundai Shell Mobis WRT | |
| 2024 | 8 | (Monaco) 2024 Monte Carlo Rally | Mixed | (Belgium) Thierry Neuville | (Belgium) Martijn Wydaeghe | (South Korea) Hyundai Shell Mobis WRT | |
| 2024 | 9 | 2024 Rally Sweden | Snow | (Finland) Esapekka Lappi | (Finland) Janne Ferm | (South Korea) Hyundai Shell Mobis WRT | |
| 2024 | 10 | (Italy) 2024 Rally Italia Sardegna | Gravel | (Estonia) Ott Tänak | (Estonia) Martin Järveoja | (South Korea) Hyundai Shell Mobis WRT | |
| 2024 | 11 | (Greece) 2024 Acropolis Rally | Gravel | (Belgium) Thierry Neuville | (Belgium) Martijn Wydaeghe | (South Korea) Hyundai Shell Mobis WRT | |
| 2024 | 12 | (Europe) 2024 Central European Rally | Tarmac | (Estonia) Ott Tänak | (Estonia) Martin Järveoja | (South Korea) Hyundai Shell Mobis WRT | |
| 2025 | 13 | (Greece) 2025 Acropolis Rally | Gravel | (Estonia) Ott Tänak | (Estonia) Martin Järveoja | (South Korea) Hyundai Shell Mobis WRT | |
| 2025 | 14 | 2025 Rally Saudi Arabia | Gravel | (Belgium) Thierry Neuville | (Belgium) Martijn Wydaeghe | (South Korea) Hyundai Shell Mobis WRT | |
| 2026 | 15 | 2026 Rally de Portugal | Gravel | (Belgium) Thierry Neuville | (Belgium) Martijn Wydaeghe | (South Korea) Hyundai Shell Mobis WRT | |

== Rally results ==
=== Complete World Rally Championship results ===
| Year | Entrant | Driver | Rounds | | | | | | | | | | | | | | Points | WCM pos. |
| Year | Entrant | Driver | 1 | 2 | 3 | 4 | 5 | 6 | 7 | 8 | 9 | 10 | 11 | 12 | 13 | 14 | Points | WCM pos. |
|---|---|---|---|---|---|---|---|---|---|---|---|---|---|---|---|---|---|---|
| 2022 | Hyundai Shell Mobis WRT | (Belgium) Thierry Neuville | MON; 6 | SWE; 2 | CRO; 3 | POR; 5 | ITA; 41 | KEN; 5 | EST; 4 | FIN; 5 | BEL; 20 | GRE; 1 | NZL; 4 | ESP; 2 | JPN; 1 | | 455 | 2nd |
| 2022 | Hyundai Shell Mobis WRT | (Estonia) Ott Tänak | MON; Ret | SWE; 20 | CRO; 2 | POR; 6 | ITA; 1 | KEN; Ret | EST; 3 | FIN; 1 | BEL; 1 | GRE; 2 | NZL; 3 | ESP; 4 | JPN; 2 | | 455 | 2nd |
| 2022 | Hyundai Shell Mobis WRT | (Sweden) Oliver Solberg | MON; Ret | SWE; 6 | CRO; Ret | POR | ITA | KEN; 10 | EST; 13 | FIN; Ret | BEL; 4 | GRE | NZL; 5 | ESP | JPN | | 455 | 2nd |
| 2022 | Hyundai Shell Mobis WRT | (Spain) Dani Sordo | MON | SWE | CRO | POR; 3 | ITA; 3 | KEN | EST | FIN | BEL | GRE; 3 | NZL | ESP; 5 | JPN; Ret | | 455 | 2nd |
| 2023 | Hyundai Shell Mobis WRT | (Belgium) Thierry Neuville | MON; 3 | SWE; 3 | MEX; 2 | CRO; 33 | POR; 5 | ITA; 1 | KEN; DSQ | EST; 2 | FIN; 2 | GRE; 20 | CHI; 2 | EUR; 1 | JPN; 13 | | 432 | 2nd |
| 2023 | Hyundai Shell Mobis WRT | (Finland) Esapekka Lappi | MON; 8 | SWE; 7 | MEX; Ret | CRO; 3 | POR; 3 | ITA; 2 | KEN; 12 | EST; 3 | FIN; Ret | GRE; 5 | CHI; Ret | EUR; Ret | JPN; 4 | | 432 | 2nd |
| 2023 | Hyundai Shell Mobis WRT | (Spain) Dani Sordo | MON; 7 | SWE | MEX; 5 | CRO | POR; 2 | ITA; Ret | KEN; 5 | EST | FIN | GRE; 3 | CHI | EUR | JPN; Ret | | 432 | 2nd |
| 2023 | Hyundai Shell Mobis WRT | (Republic of Ireland) Craig Breen | MON | SWE; 2 | MEX | CRO; WD | POR | ITA | KEN | EST | FIN | GRE | CHI | EUR | JPN | | 432 | 2nd |
| 2023 | Hyundai Shell Mobis WRT | (Finland) Teemu Suninen | MON | SWE | MEX | CRO | POR | ITA | KEN | EST; 5 | FIN; 4 | GRE | CHI; Ret | EUR; 6 | JPN | | 432 | 2nd |
| 2024 | Hyundai Shell Mobis WRT | (Belgium) Thierry Neuville | MON; 1 | SWE; 4 | KEN; 5 | CRO; 3 | POR; 3 | ITA; 41 | POL; 4 | LAT; 8 | FIN; 2 | GRE; 1 | CHL; 4 | EUR; 3 | JPN; 6 | | 558 | 2nd |
| 2024 | Hyundai Shell Mobis WRT | (Estonia) Ott Tänak | MON; 4 | SWE; 41 | KEN; 8 | CRO; 4 | POR; 2 | ITA; 1 | POL; 40 | LAT; 3 | FIN; Ret | GRE; 3 | CHL; 3 | EUR; 1 | JPN; Ret | | 558 | 2nd |
| 2024 | Hyundai Shell Mobis WRT | (Finland) Esapekka Lappi | MON | SWE; 1 | KEN; 12 | CRO | POR | ITA | POL | LAT; Ret | FIN; 43 | GRE | CHL; Ret | EUR | JPN | | 558 | 2nd |
| 2024 | Hyundai Shell Mobis WRT | (Norway) Andreas Mikkelsen | MON; 6 | SWE | KEN | CRO; 6 | POR | ITA | POL; 6 | LAT | FIN | GRE | CHL | EUR; 31 | JPN; 31 | | 558 | 2nd |
| 2024 | Hyundai Shell Mobis WRT | (Spain) Dani Sordo | MON | SWE | KEN | CRO | POR; 4 | ITA; 3 | POL | LAT | FIN | GRE; 2 | CHL | EUR | JPN | | 558 | 2nd |
| 2025 | Hyundai Shell Mobis WRT | (France) Adrien Fourmaux | MON; 3 | SWE; 40 | KEN; 16 | ESP; 5 | POR; Ret | ITA; 20 | GRE; 3 | EST; 5 | FIN; Ret | PAR; Ret | CHL; 3 | EUR; 5 | JPN; Ret | SAU; 2 | 511 | 2nd |
| 2025 | Hyundai Shell Mobis WRT | (Belgium) Thierry Neuville | MON; 6 | SWE; 3 | KEN; 3 | ESP; 7 | POR; 4 | ITA; 19 | GRE; 5 | EST; 3 | FIN; 6 | PAR; 3 | CHL; 4 | EUR; Ret | JPN; Ret | SAU; 1 | 511 | 2nd |
| 2025 | Hyundai Shell Mobis WRT | (Estonia) Ott Tänak | MON; 5 | SWE; 4 | KEN; 2 | ESP; 6 | POR; 2 | ITA; 2 | GRE; 1 | EST; 2 | FIN; 10 | PAR; 4 | CHL; 34 | EUR; 3 | JPN; 4 | SAU; 11 | 511 | 2nd |
| 2026 | Hyundai Shell Mobis WRT | (France) Adrien Fourmaux | MON; 4 | SWE; 5 | KEN; 2 | CRO; 30 | ESP; 5 | POR; 4 | JPN; 5 | GRE; 7 | EST; 3 | FIN; 4 | PAR; 3 | CHL; 3 | ITA; 4 | | 440 | 2nd |
| 2026 | Hyundai Shell Mobis WRT | (Belgium) Thierry Neuville | MON; 5 | SWE; 7 | KEN; 12 | CRO; Ret | ESP; 6 | POR; 1 | JPN; 6 | GRE; 2 | EST; 4 | FIN; 5 | PAR; 37 | CHL; Ret | ITA; 15 | | 440 | 2nd |
| 2026 | Hyundai Shell Mobis WRT | (New Zealand) Hayden Paddon | MON; 11 | SWE | KEN | CRO; 3 | ESP | POR | JPN; 7 | GRE | EST | FIN | PAR; 2 | CHL | ITA | | 440 | 2nd |
| 2026 | Hyundai Shell Mobis WRT | (Finland) Esapekka Lappi | MON | SWE; 6 | KEN; 4 | CRO | ESP | POR | JPN | GRE | EST; 8 | FIN; Ret | PAR | CHL; 6 | ITA | | 440 | 2nd |
| 2026 | Hyundai Shell Mobis WRT | (Spain) Dani Sordo | MON | SWE | KEN | CRO | ESP; 7 | POR; 8 | JPN | GRE; Ret | EST | FIN | PAR | CHL | ITA; Ret | | 440 | 2nd |

* Season still in progress.
