= 2026 Safari Rally =

74th edition of the Safari Rally

2026 Safari Rally Safari Rally Kenya 2026
Round 3 of 13 in the 2026 World Rally Championship
← Previous event	Next event →
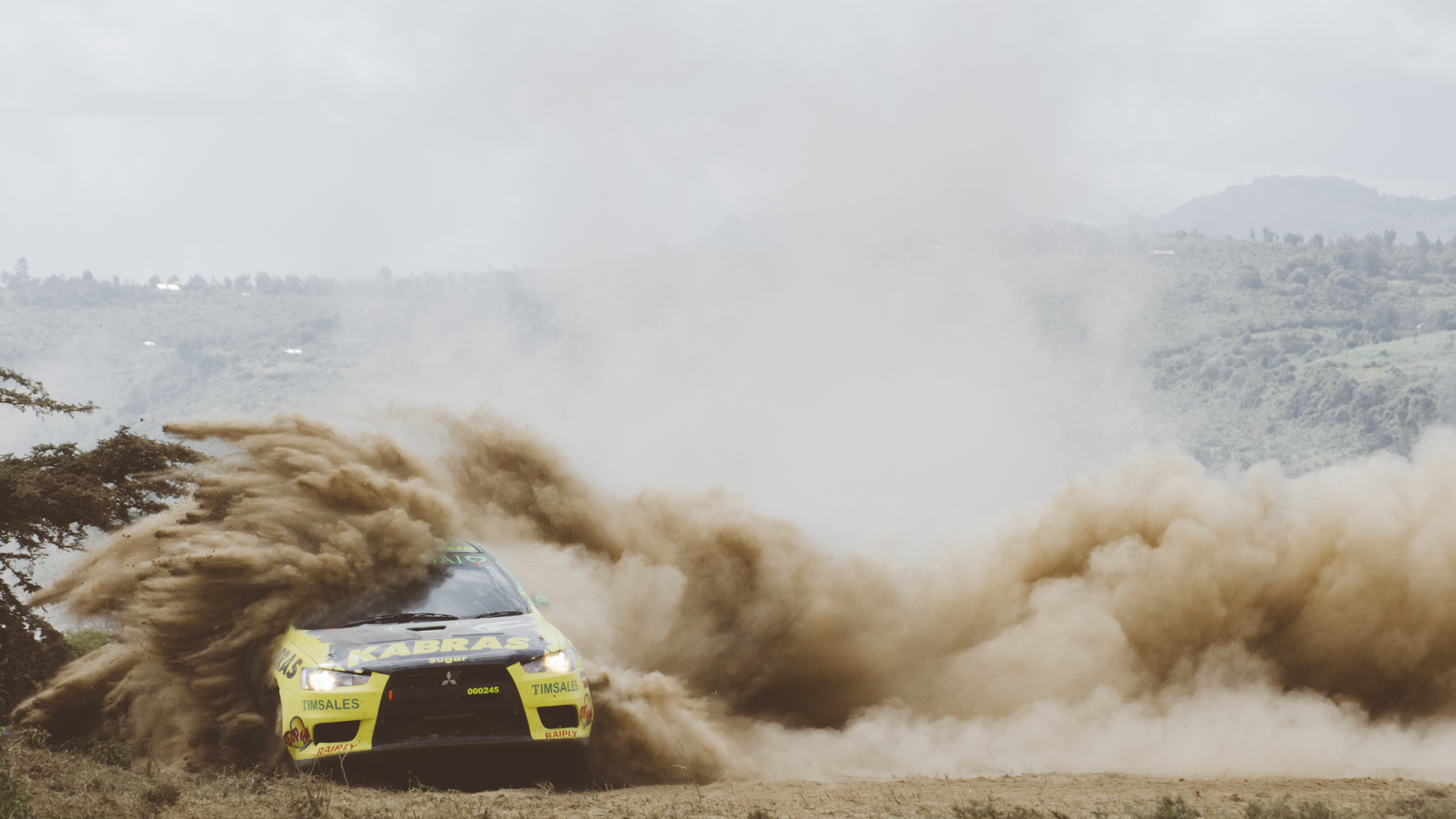
- The rally is featured with rocky and rutted tracks and unpredictable weather.
- Host country: Kenya
- Rally base: Naivasha, Nakuru County
- Dates run: 12 – 15 March 2026
- Start location: Kasarani, Nairobi
- Finish location: Hell's Gate National Park, Naivasha
- Stages: 20 (350.52 km; 217.80 miles)
- Stage surface: Gravel
- Transport distance: 877.34 km (545.15 miles)
- Overall distance: 1,227.86 km (762.96 miles)

Statistics
- Crews registered: 46
- Crews: 40 at start, 29 at finish

Overall results
- Overall winner: (Japan) Takamoto Katsuta (Republic of Ireland) Aaron Johnston (Japan) Toyota Gazoo Racing WRT; 3:16:05.6
- Sunday Accumulated leader: (Sweden) Oliver Solberg (United Kingdom) Elliott Edmondson (Japan) Toyota Gazoo Racing WRT; 33:28.9
- Power Stage winner: (Sweden) Oliver Solberg (United Kingdom) Elliott Edmondson (Japan) Toyota Gazoo Racing WRT; 5:32.2

Support category results
- WRC-2 winner: (Estonia) Robert Virves (Estonia) Jakko Viilo (Germany) Toksport WRT; 3:27:44.3
- WRC-3 winner: (Greece) Georgios Vasilakis (Republic of Ireland) Allan Harryman; 4:25:07.7

The 2026 Safari Rally (also known as the Safari Rally Kenya 2026) was a motor racing event for rally cars held over four days from 12 to 15 March 2026. It marked the seventy-fourth running of the Safari Rally, and was the third round of the 2026 World Rally Championship, 2026 WRC2 Championship and 2026 WRC3 Championship. The 2026 event was based in Naivasha in the Nakuru County, and was consisted of twenty special stages, covering a total competitive distance of 350.52 km (217.80 mi).

Elfyn Evans and Scott Martin were the defending rally winners, and Toyota Gazoo Racing WRT, were the defending manufacturer's winners. Gus Greensmith and Jonas Andersson were the defending rally winners in the WRC2 championship. Nikhil Sachania and Deep Patel were the defending rally winners in the WRC3 championship.

Takamoto Katsuta and Aaron Johnston took their maiden victory, and Toyota successfully defended their title. Robert Virves and Jakko Viilo were the winners in the WRC2 category. Georgios Vasilakis and Allan Harryman were the winners in the WRC3 category.

== Background ==
=== Entry list ===
The following crews entered into the rally. The event was open to crews competing in the World Rally Championship, its support categories, the WRC2 Championship, the WRC3 Championship and privateer entries that were not registered to score points in any championship. Ten crews entered under Rally1 regulations, as were fifteen Rally2 crews in the WRC2 Championship and four Rally3 crews in the WRC3 Championship.

Rally1 entries competing in the World Rally Championship
No.	Driver	Co-Driver	Entrant	Car	Championship eligibility	Tyre
1	(France) Sébastien Ogier	(France) Vincent Landais	(Japan) Toyota Gazoo Racing WRT	Toyota GR Yaris Rally1	Driver, Co-driver, Manufacturer	H
4	(Finland) Esapekka Lappi	(Finland) Enni Mälkönen	(South Korea) Hyundai Shell Mobis WRT	Hyundai i20 N Rally1	Driver, Co-driver, Manufacturer	H
5	(Finland) Sami Pajari	(Finland) Marko Salminen	(Japan) Toyota Gazoo Racing WRT2	Toyota GR Yaris Rally1	Driver, Co-driver, Manufacturer, Team	H
11	(Belgium) Thierry Neuville	(Belgium) Martijn Wydaeghe	(South Korea) Hyundai Shell Mobis WRT	Hyundai i20 N Rally1	Driver, Co-driver, Manufacturer	H
16	(France) Adrien Fourmaux	(France) Alexandre Coria	(South Korea) Hyundai Shell Mobis WRT	Hyundai i20 N Rally1	Driver, Co-driver, Manufacturer	H
18	(Japan) Takamoto Katsuta	(Republic of Ireland) Aaron Johnston	(Japan) Toyota Gazoo Racing WRT	Toyota GR Yaris Rally1	Driver, Co-driver	H
33	(United Kingdom) Elfyn Evans	(United Kingdom) Scott Martin	(Japan) Toyota Gazoo Racing WRT	Toyota GR Yaris Rally1	Driver, Co-driver, Manufacturer	H
55	(Republic of Ireland) Josh McErlean	(Republic of Ireland) Eoin Treacy	(United Kingdom) M-Sport Ford WRT	Ford Puma Rally1	Driver, Co-driver, Manufacturer	H
95	(Republic of Ireland) Jon Armstrong	(Republic of Ireland) Shane Byrne	(United Kingdom) M-Sport Ford WRT	Ford Puma Rally1	Driver, Co-driver, Manufacturer	H
99	(Sweden) Oliver Solberg	(United Kingdom) Elliott Edmondson	(Japan) Toyota Gazoo Racing WRT	Toyota GR Yaris Rally1	Driver, Co-driver, Manufacturer	H

Rally2 entries competing in the WRC2 Championship
No.	Driver	Co-Driver	Entrant	Car	Championship eligibility	Tyre
20	(United Kingdom) Gus Greensmith	(Sweden) Jonas Andersson	(United Kingdom) Gus Greensmith	Toyota GR Yaris Rally2	Driver, Co-driver	H
21	(Estonia) Robert Virves	(Estonia) Jakko Viilo	(Germany) Toksport WRT	Škoda Fabia RS Rally2	Challenger Driver, Challenger Co-driver, Team	H
22	(Norway) Andreas Mikkelsen	(Norway) Jørn Listerud	(Germany) Toksport WRT	Škoda Fabia RS Rally2	Challenger Driver, Challenger Co-driver, Team	H
23	(Paraguay) Fabrizio Zaldivar	(Italy) Marcelo Der Ohannesian	(Paraguay) Fabrizio Zaldivar	Škoda Fabia RS Rally2	Challenger Driver, Challenger Co-driver	H
24	(Estonia) Romet Jürgenson	(Estonia) Siim Oja	(United Kingdom) M-Sport Ford WRT	Ford Fiesta Rally2	Challenger Driver, Challenger Co-driver	H
25	(Paraguay) Diego Domínguez Jr.	(Spain) Rogelio Peñate	(Paraguay) Diego Domínguez Jr.	Toyota GR Yaris Rally2	Challenger Driver, Challenger Co-driver	H
26	(Poland) Daniel Chwist	(Poland) Kamil Heller	(Poland) Daniel Chwist	Škoda Fabia RS Rally2	Challenger Driver, Challenger Co-driver	H
27	(Kenya) Karan Patel	(Kenya) Tauseef Khan	(Kenya) Karan Patel	Škoda Fabia R5	Challenger Driver, Challenger Co-driver	H
28	(Kenya) Carl Tundo	(Kenya) Tim Jessop	(Kenya) Carl Tundo	Ford Fiesta R5	Challenger/Master Driver, Challenger Co-driver	H
29	(Kenya) Samman Singh Vohra	(United Kingdom) Drew Sturrock	(Kenya) Samman Singh Vohra	Škoda Fabia Rally2 evo	Challenger Driver, Challenger Co-driver	H
30	(Kenya) Jeremiah Wahome	(Kenya) Victor Okundi	(Kenya) Jeremiah Wahome	Škoda Fabia RS Rally2	Challenger Driver, Challenger Co-driver	H
31	(Paraguay) Andrea Lafarja	(Paraguay) Germán Maune	(Paraguay) Andrea Lafarja	Toyota GR Yaris Rally2	Challenger/Masters Driver, Challenger Co-driver	H
32	(Kenya) Issa Amwari	(Kenya) Dennis Mwenda	(Kenya) Issa Amwari	Škoda Fabia R5	Challenger Driver, Challenger Co-driver	H
34	(Kenya) Aakif Virani	(Kenya) Zahir Shah	(Kenya) Aakif Virani	Škoda Fabia R5	Challenger/Masters Driver, Challenger Co-driver	H
40	(Kenya) Hamza Anwar	(Kenya) Chaudry Mudasar	(Kenya) Hamza Anwar	Ford Fiesta R5	Challenger Driver, Challenger Co-driver	H

Rally3 entries competing in the WRC3 Championship
No.	Driver	Co-Driver	Entrant	Car	Class/Championship eligibility	Tyre
36	(Bolivia) Nataniel Bruun	(Spain) Sergio Fernández Guerra	(Bolivia) Nataniel Bruun	Ford Fiesta Rally3	WRC3	H
37	(Greece) Georgios Vasilakis	(Republic of Ireland) Allan Harryman	(Greece) Georgios Vasilakis	Ford Fiesta Rally3	WRC3, Masters Driver, Masters Co-Driver	H
38	(India) Naveen Puligilla	(India) Musa Sherif	(India) Naveen Puligilla	Ford Fiesta Rally3	WRC3	H
39	(Kenya) Nikhil Sachania	(Kenya) Deep Patel	(Kenya) Nikhil Sachania	Ford Fiesta Rally3	WRC3	H

=== Itinerary ===
All dates and times are EAT (UTC+3).

Date	No.	Time span	Stage name	Distance
12 March	—	After 8:01	Nawisa [Shakedown]	6.31 km
12 March		After 15:00	Opening ceremony, WRTI Naivasha	—N/a
12 March	SS1	After 16:05	Camp Moran 1	24.35 km
12 March	SS2	After 17:23	Mzabibu 1	8.86 km
12 March		18:23 – 19:08	Service A, WRTI Naivasha	—N/a
13 March	SS3	After 8:03	Camp Moran 2	24.35 km
13 March	SS4	After 9:06	Loldia 1	25.04 km
13 March	SS5	After 10:24	Kengen Geothermal 1	13.16 km
13 March	SS6	After 11:17	Kedong 1	13.79 km
13 March		11:57 – 12:57	Regroup, WRTI Naivasha	—N/a
13 March		12:57 – 13:27	Service B, WRTI Naivasha	—N/a
13 March	SS7	After 14:00	Kedong 1	13.79 km
13 March	SS8	After 14:58	Kengen Geothermal 1	13.16 km
13 March	SS9	After 15:56	Loldia 1	25.04 km
13 March	SS10	After 16:59	Mzabibu 2	8.86 km
13 March		17:59 – 18:44	Flexi service C, WRTI Naivasha	—N/a
14 March	SS11	After 8:35	Soysambu 1	24.94 km
14 March	SS12	After 9:35	Elmenteita 1	18.01 km
14 March	SS13	After 10:33	Sleeping Warrior 1	18.01 km
14 March		12:30 – 13:15	Regroup, WRTI Naivasha	—N/a
14 March		13:15 – 13:45	Service D, WRTI Naivasha	—N/a
14 March	SS14	After 15:05	Soysambu 2	24.94 km
14 March	SS15	After 16:05	Elmenteita 2	18.01 km
14 March	SS16	After 17:03	Sleeping Warrior 2	18.01 km
14 March		19:28 – 20:13	Flexi service E, WRTI Naivasha	—N/a
15 March	SS17	After 8:09	Oserengoni 1	18.22 km
15 March	SS18	After 9:35	Hell's Gate 1	10.48 km
15 March	SS19	After 10:38	Oserengoni 2	18.22 km
15 March		11:47 – 12:50	Regroup, WRTI Naivasha	—N/a
15 March	SS20	After 13:15	Hell's Gate 2 [Power Stage]	10.53 km
15 March		After 14:15	Podium ceremony, WSTI Naivasha	—N/a
15 March		After 15:50	Finish, WSTI Naivasha	—N/a

== Report ==
=== WRC Rally1 ===
==== Classification ====
Position		No.	Driver	Co-driver	Entrant	Car	Time	Difference	Points			
Event	Class	No.	Driver	Co-driver	Entrant	Car	Time	Difference	Event	Sunday	Stage	Total
1	1	18	Takamoto Katsuta	Aaron Johnston	Toyota Gazoo Racing WRT	Toyota GR Yaris Rally1	3:16:05.6	0.0	25	0	0	25
2	2	16	Adrien Fourmaux	Alexandre Coria	Hyundai Shell Mobis WRT	Hyundai i20 N Rally1	3:16:33.0	+27.4	17	1	1	19
3	3	5	Sami Pajari	Marko Salminen	Toyota Gazoo Racing WRT2	Toyota GR Yaris Rally1	3:20:31.7	+4:26.1	15	0	0	15
4	4	4	Esapekka Lappi	Enni Mälkönen	Hyundai Shell Mobis WRT	Hyundai i20 N Rally1	3:22:12.9	+6:07.3	12	0	0	12
10	5	99	Oliver Solberg	Elliott Edmondson	Toyota Gazoo Racing WRT	Toyota GR Yaris Rally1	3:32:50.1	+16:44.5	1	5	5	11
11	6	1	Sébastien Ogier	Vincent Landais	Toyota Gazoo Racing WRT	Toyota GR Yaris Rally1	3:33:36.3	+17:30.7	0	4	4	8
12	7	11	Thierry Neuville	Martijn Wydaeghe	Hyundai Shell Mobis WRT	Hyundai i20 N Rally1	3:35:58.0	+19:52.4	0	2	2	4
13	8	33	Elfyn Evans	Scott Martin	Toyota Gazoo Racing WRT	Toyota GR Yaris Rally1	3:42:26.5	+26:20.9	0	3	3	6
15	9	95	Jon Armstrong	Shane Byrne	M-Sport Ford WRT	Ford Puma Rally1	4:04:06.7	+48:01.1	0	0	0	0
Retired SS17		55	Josh McErlean	Eoin Treacy	M-Sport Ford WRT	Ford Puma Rally1	Engine		0	0	0	0

==== Special stages ====
Stage	Winners	Car	Time	Class leaders
SD	Neuville / Wydaeghe	Hyundai i20 N Rally1	4:33.1	—N/a
SS1	Solberg / Edmondson	Toyota GR Yaris Rally1	22:56.2	Solberg / Edmondson
SS2	Ogier / Landais	Toyota GR Yaris Rally1	7:18.2	Solberg / Edmondson
SS3	Stage cancelled			
SS4	Ogier / Landais	Toyota GR Yaris Rally1	14:18.8	Solberg / Edmondson
SS5	Pajari / Salminen	Toyota GR Yaris Rally1	6:53.3	Solberg / Edmondson
SS6	Pajari / Salminen	Toyota GR Yaris Rally1	6:22.6	Solberg / Edmondson
SS7	Ogier / Landais	Toyota GR Yaris Rally1	6:24.4	Solberg / Edmondson
SS8	Pajari / Salminen	Toyota GR Yaris Rally1	6:50.2	Solberg / Edmondson
SS9	Ogier / Landais	Toyota GR Yaris Rally1	14:14.1	Solberg / Edmondson
SS10	Pajari / Salminen	Toyota GR Yaris Rally1	7:07.8	Solberg / Edmondson
SS11	Solberg / Edmondson	Toyota GR Yaris Rally1	15:18.9	Solberg / Edmondson
SS12	Ogier / Landais	Toyota GR Yaris Rally1	11:16.3	Solberg / Edmondson
SS13	Ogier / Landais	Toyota GR Yaris Rally1	11:32.3	Solberg / Edmondson
SS14	Fourmaux / Coria	Hyundai i20 N Rally1	15:12.8	Katsuta / Johnston
SS15	Pajari / Salminen	Toyota GR Yaris Rally1	10:45.3	Katsuta / Johnston
SS16	Stage cancelled			
SS17	Ogier / Landais	Toyota GR Yaris Rally1	11:18.9	Katsuta / Johnston
SS18	Evans / Martin	Toyota GR Yaris Rally1	5:32.4	Katsuta / Johnston
SS19	Solberg / Edmondson	Toyota GR Yaris Rally1	10:58.1	Katsuta / Johnston
SS20	Solberg / Edmondson	Toyota GR Yaris Rally1	5:32.2	Katsuta / Johnston

==== Championship standings ====
Drivers' Standings
Move	Pos.	Driver	Points
	1	Elfyn Evans	66
	2	Oliver Solberg	58
	3	Takamoto Katsuta	55
	4	Adrien Fourmaux	47
2	5	Sami Pajari	32

Co-drivers' Standings
Move	Pos.	Driver	Points
	1	Scott Martin	66
	2	Elliott Edmondson	58
	3	Aaron Johnston	55
	4	Alexandre Coria	47
2	5	Marko Salminen	32

Manufacturers' Standings
Move	Pos.	Driver	Points
	1	Toyota Gazoo Racing WRT	157
	2	Hyundai Shell Mobis WRT	114
	3	Toyota Gazoo Racing WRT2	35
	4	M-Sport Ford WRT	23

=== WRC2 Rally2 ===
==== Classification ====
Position		No.	Driver	Co-driver	Entrant	Car	Time	Difference	Points	
Event	Class	No.	Driver	Co-driver	Entrant	Car	Time	Difference	Class	Event
5	1	21	Robert Virves	Jakko Viilo	Toksport WRT	Škoda Fabia RS Rally2	3:27:44.3	0.0	25	10
6	2	20	Gus Greensmith	Jonas Andersson	Gus Greensmith	Toyota GR Yaris Rally2	3:28:14.6	+30.3	17	8
7	3	23	Fabrizio Zaldivar	Marcelo Der Ohannesian	Fabrizio Zaldivar	Škoda Fabia RS Rally2	3:28:25.6	+41.3	15	6
8	4	22	Andreas Mikkelsen	Jørn Listerud	Toksport WRT	Škoda Fabia RS Rally2	3:28:36.3	+52.0	12	4
9	5	25	Diego Domínguez Jr.	Rogelio Peñate	Diego Domínguez Jr.	Toyota GR Yaris Rally2	3:29:34.0	+1:49.7	10	2
14	6	26	Daniel Chwist	Kamil Heller	Daniel Chwist	Škoda Fabia RS Rally2	4:01:42.3	+33:58.0	8	0
17	7	27	Karan Patel	Tauseef Khan	Karan Patel	Škoda Fabia R5	4:26:54.7	+59:10.4	6	0
18	8	34	Aakif Virani	Zahir Shah	Aakif Virani	Škoda Fabia R5	4:43:06.7	+1:15:22.4	4	0
19	9	29	Samman Singh Vohra	Drew Sturrock	Samman Singh Vohra	Škoda Fabia Rally2 evo	4:46:47.1	+1:19:02.8	2	0
20	10	31	Andrea Lafarja	Germán Maune	Andrea Lafarja	Toyota GR Yaris Rally2	5:04:23.9	+1:36:39.6	1	0
Retired SS19		24	Romet Jürgenson	Siim Oja	M-Sport Ford WRT	Ford Fiesta Rally2	Technical		0	0
Retired SS17		40	Hamza Anwar	Chaudry Mudasar	Hamza Anwar	Ford Fiesta R5	Mechanical		0	0

==== Special stages ====
Overall
Stage	Winners	Car	Time	Class leaders
SD	Mikkelsen / Listerud	Škoda Fabia RS Rally2	4:53.9	—N/a
SS1	Zaldivar / Der Ohannesian	Škoda Fabia RS Rally2	26:10.9	Zaldivar / Der Ohannesian
SS2	Domínguez Jr. / Peñate	Toyota GR Yaris Rally2	7:40.8	Greensmith / Andersson
SS3	Stage cancelled			
SS4	Mikkelsen / Listerud	Škoda Fabia RS Rally2	14:53.5	Greensmith / Andersson
SS5	Greensmith / Andersson	Toyota GR Yaris Rally2	7:29.8	Greensmith / Andersson
SS6	Mikkelsen / Listerud	Škoda Fabia RS Rally2	6:52.9	Greensmith / Andersson
SS7	Zaldivar / Der Ohannesian	Škoda Fabia RS Rally2	6:32.2	Virves / Viilo
SS8	Zaldivar / Der Ohannesian	Škoda Fabia RS Rally2	7:23.0	Virves / Viilo
SS9	Mikkelsen / Listerud	Škoda Fabia RS Rally2	14:52.3	Virves / Viilo
SS10	Domínguez Jr. / Peñate	Toyota GR Yaris Rally2	7:22.7	Virves / Viilo
SS11	Mikkelsen / Listerud	Škoda Fabia RS Rally2	16:28.2	Virves / Viilo
SS12	Mikkelsen / Listerud	Škoda Fabia RS Rally2	11:58.9	Virves / Viilo
SS13	Stage cancelled			
SS14	Mikkelsen / Listerud	Škoda Fabia RS Rally2	15:53.9	Virves / Viilo
SS15	Domínguez Jr. / Peñate	Toyota GR Yaris Rally2	11:10.3	Virves / Viilo
SS16	Stage cancelled			
SS17	Mikkelsen / Listerud	Škoda Fabia RS Rally2	12:03.7	Virves / Viilo
SS18	Mikkelsen / Listerud	Škoda Fabia RS Rally2	6:02.4	Virves / Viilo
SS19	Domínguez Jr. / Peñate	Toyota GR Yaris Rally2	11:55.2	Virves / Viilo
SS20	Zaldivar / Der Ohannesian	Škoda Fabia RS Rally2	6:02.3	Virves / Viilo

Challenger
Stage	Winners	Car	Time	Class leaders
SD	Jürgenson / Oja	Ford Fiesta Rally2	4:54.5	—N/a
SS1	Zaldivar / Der Ohannesian	Škoda Fabia RS Rally2	26:10.9	Zaldivar / Der Ohannesian
SS2	Domínguez Jr. / Peñate	Toyota GR Yaris Rally2	7:40.8	Domínguez Jr. / Peñate
SS3	Stage cancelled			
SS4	Virves / Viilo	Škoda Fabia RS Rally2	15:18.2	Domínguez Jr. / Peñate
SS5	Virves / Viilo	Škoda Fabia RS Rally2	7:31.4	Domínguez Jr. / Peñate
SS6	Virves / Viilo	Škoda Fabia RS Rally2	6:53.3	Virves / Viilo
SS7	Zaldivar / Der Ohannesian	Škoda Fabia RS Rally2	6:53.2	Virves / Viilo
SS8	Zaldivar / Der Ohannesian	Škoda Fabia RS Rally2	7:23.0	Virves / Viilo
SS9	Domínguez Jr. / Peñate	Toyota GR Yaris Rally2	14:55.1	Virves / Viilo
SS10	Domínguez Jr. / Peñate	Toyota GR Yaris Rally2	7:22.7	Virves / Viilo
SS11	Virves / Viilo	Škoda Fabia RS Rally2	16:33.2	Virves / Viilo
SS12	Virves / Viilo	Škoda Fabia RS Rally2	11:59.0	Virves / Viilo
SS13	Stage cancelled			
SS14	Virves / Viilo	Škoda Fabia RS Rally2	15:54.7	Virves / Viilo
SS15	Domínguez Jr. / Peñate	Toyota GR Yaris Rally2	11:10.3	Virves / Viilo
SS16	Stage cancelled			
SS17	Domínguez Jr. / Peñate	Toyota GR Yaris Rally2	12:13.7	Virves / Viilo
SS18	Virves / Viilo	Škoda Fabia RS Rally2	6:09.3	Virves / Viilo
SS19	Domínguez Jr. / Peñate	Toyota GR Yaris Rally2	11:55.2	Virves / Viilo
SS20	Zaldivar / Der Ohannesian	Škoda Fabia RS Rally2	6:02.3	Virves / Viilo

==== Championship standings ====
Drivers' Standings
Move	Pos.	Driver	Points
	1	Léo Rossel	25
	2	Roope Korhonen	25
New entry	3	Robert Virves	25
1	4	Roberto Daprà	17
1	5	Teemu Suninen	17

Co-drivers' Standings
Move	Pos.	Driver	Points
	1	Guillaume Mercoiret	25
	2	Anssi Viinikka	25
New entry	3	Jakko Viilo	25
1	4	Luca Guglielmetti	17
1	5	Janni Hussi	17

Manufacturers' Standings
Move	Pos.	Driver	Points
	1	Lancia Corse HF	42
New entry	2	Toksport WRT	42
1	3	M-Sport Ford WRT	25

Challenger Drivers' Standings
Move	Pos.	Driver	Points
	1	Léo Rossel	25
	2	Roope Korhonen	25
New entry	3	Robert Virves	25
1	4	Roberto Daprà	17
1	5	Lauri Joona	17

Challenger Co-drivers' Standings
Move	Pos.	Driver	Points
	1	Guillaume Mercoiret	25
	2	Anssi Viinikka	25
New entry	3	Jakko Viilo	25
1	4	Luca Guglielmetti	17
1	5	Antti Linnaketo	17

=== WRC3 Rally3 ===
==== Classification ====
Position		No.	Driver	Co-driver	Entrant	Car	Time	Difference	Points
Event	Class	No.	Driver	Co-driver	Entrant	Car	Time	Difference	Points
16	1	37	Georgios Vasilakis	Allan Harryman	Georgios Vasilakis	Ford Fiesta Rally3	4:25:07.7	0.0	25
23	2	39	Nikhil Sachania	Deep Patel	Nikhil Sachania	Ford Fiesta Rally3	5:15:33.4	+50:25.7	17
25	3	38	Naveen Puligilla	Musa Sherif	Naveen Puligilla	Ford Fiesta Rally3	5:22:17.9	+57:10.2	15
26	4	36	Nataniel Bruun	Sergio Fernández Guerra	Nataniel Bruun	Ford Fiesta Rally3	5:25:37.4	+1:00:29.7	12

==== Special stages ====
Stage	Winners	Car	Time	Class leaders
SD	Bruun / Guerra	Ford Fiesta Rally3	5:24.0	—N/a
SS1	Puligilla / Sherif	Ford Fiesta Rally3	34:40.4	Puligilla / Sherif
SS2	Vasilakis / Harryman	Ford Fiesta Rally3	10:14.5	Vasilakis / Harryman
SS3	Stage cancelled			
SS4	Bruun / Guerra	Ford Fiesta Rally3	17:36.4	Vasilakis / Harryman
SS5	Bruun / Guerra	Ford Fiesta Rally3	8:52.8	Vasilakis / Harryman
SS6	Bruun / Guerra	Ford Fiesta Rally3	8:21.0	Vasilakis / Harryman
SS7	Bruun / Guerra	Ford Fiesta Rally3	8:16.9	Vasilakis / Harryman
SS8	Bruun / Guerra	Ford Fiesta Rally3	8:33.6	Vasilakis / Harryman
SS9	Vasilakis / Harryman	Ford Fiesta Rally3	18:11.9	Vasilakis / Harryman
SS10	Vasilakis / Harryman	Ford Fiesta Rally3	8:36.4	Vasilakis / Harryman
SS11	Bruun / Guerra	Ford Fiesta Rally3	19:29.1	Vasilakis / Harryman
SS12	Bruun / Guerra	Ford Fiesta Rally3	14:28.8	Vasilakis / Harryman
SS13	Stage cancelled			
SS14	Bruun / Guerra	Ford Fiesta Rally3	18:58.8	Vasilakis / Harryman
SS15	Bruun / Guerra	Ford Fiesta Rally3	14:23.8	Vasilakis / Harryman
SS16	Stage cancelled			
SS17	Bruun / Guerra	Ford Fiesta Rally3	14:02.8	Vasilakis / Harryman
SS18	Bruun / Guerra	Ford Fiesta Rally3	7:02.8	Vasilakis / Harryman
SS19	Bruun / Guerra	Ford Fiesta Rally3	14:44.2	Vasilakis / Harryman
SS20	Bruun / Guerra	Ford Fiesta Rally3	7:04.4	Vasilakis / Harryman

==== Championship standings ====
Drivers' Standings
Move	Pos.	Driver	Points
	1	Matteo Fontana	42
	2	Eric Royère	33
5	3	Georgios Vasilakis	31
1	4	Tymoteusz Abramowski	17
New entry	5	Nikhil Sachania	17

Co-drivers' Standings
Move	Pos.	Driver	Points
	1	Alessandro Arnaboldi	42
	2	Alexis Grenier	33
5	3	Allan Harryman	31
1	4	Jakub Wróbel	17
New entry	5	Deep Patel	17

Previous rally: 2026 Rally Sweden	2026 FIA World Rally Championship	Next rally: 2026 Croatia Rally
Previous rally: 2025 Safari Rally	2026 Safari Rally	Next rally: 2027 Safari Rally
