= 2026 Rally del Paraguay =

3rd edition of the Rally del Paraguay

2026 Rally del Paraguay Ueno Rally del Paraguay 2026
Round 11 of 13 in the 2026 World Rally Championship
← Previous event	Next event →
- Host country: Paraguay
- Rally base: Encarnación, Itapúa
- Dates run: 27 – 30 August 2026
- Start location: Cambyretá, Itapúa
- Finish location: Encarnación, Itapúa
- Stages: 22 (358.88 km; 223.00 miles)
- Stage surface: Gravel
- Transport distance: 578.88 km (359.70 miles)
- Overall distance: 937.76 km (582.70 miles)

Statistics
- Crews registered: 60
- Crews: 58 at start, 44 at finish

Overall results
- Overall winner: (Finland) Sami Pajari (Finland) Marko Salminen (Japan) Toyota Gazoo Racing WRT; 3:13:28.5
- Sunday Accumulated leader: (France) Sébastien Ogier (France) Vincent Landais (Japan) Toyota Gazoo Racing WRT; 24:30.1
- Power Stage winner: (Sweden) Oliver Solberg (United Kingdom) Elliott Edmondson (Japan) Toyota Gazoo Racing WRT; 5:42.2

Support category results
- WRC-2 winner: (Paraguay) Diego Domínguez Jr. (Spain) Rogelio Peñate (Paraguay) Diego Domínguez Jr. 3:21:09.0
- WRC-3 winner: (Bolivia) Nataniel Bruun (Argentina) Mario Javier del Riego (Bolivia) Nataniel Bruun; 3:42:02.3

The 2026 Rally del Paraguay (also known as the Ueno Rally del Paraguay 2026) was a motor racing event for rally cars that was held over four days from 27 to 30 August 2026. It would mark the third running of the Rally del Paraguay, and was the eleventh round of the 2026 World Rally Championship, 2026 WRC2 Championship and 2026 WRC3 Championship. The 2026 event was based in Encarnación in Itapúa, and consisted of twenty-two special stages, covering a total competitive distance of 358.88 km (223.00 mi).

Sébastien Ogier and Vincent Landais are the defending rally winners, and their team, Toyota Gazoo Racing WRT, are the defending manufacturer's winners. Oliver Solberg and Elliott Edmondson were the defending rally winners in the WRC2 championship, but they did not defend their titles as they were signed by Toyota to contest the top tier this season. Matteo Fontana and Alessandro Arnaboldi were the defending rally winners in the WRC3 championship.

Sami Pajari and Marko Salminen won their third rally of the season, and Toyota successfully defended their manufacturer's title. Diego Domínguez Jr. and Rogelio Peñate were the winners in the WRC2 category. Nataniel Bruun and Mario Javier del Riego were the winners in the WRC3 category.

== Background ==
=== Entry list ===
The following crews were entered into the rally. The event was opened to crews competing in the World Rally Championship, its support categories, the WRC2 Championship, the WRC3 Championship and privateer entries that are not registered to score points in any championship. Ten crews are set to enter under Rally1 regulations, as were twenty-five Rally2 crews in the WRC2 Championship and seven Rally3 crews in the WRC3 Championship.

Rally1 entries competing in the World Rally Championship
No.	Driver	Co-Driver	Entrant	Car	Championship eligibility	Tyre
1	(France) Sébastien Ogier	(France) Vincent Landais	(Japan) Toyota Gazoo Racing WRT	Toyota GR Yaris Rally1	Driver, Co-driver, Manufacturer	H
5	(Finland) Sami Pajari	(Finland) Marko Salminen	(Japan) Toyota Gazoo Racing WRT2	Toyota GR Yaris Rally1	Driver, Co-driver, Manufacturer, Team	H
11	(Belgium) Thierry Neuville	(Belgium) Martijn Wydaeghe	(South Korea) Hyundai Shell Mobis WRT	Hyundai i20 N Rally1	Driver, Co-driver, Manufacturer	H
16	(France) Adrien Fourmaux	(France) Alexandre Coria	(South Korea) Hyundai Shell Mobis WRT	Hyundai i20 N Rally1	Driver, Co-driver, Manufacturer	H
18	(Japan) Takamoto Katsuta	(Republic of Ireland) Aaron Johnston	(Japan) Toyota Gazoo Racing WRT	Toyota GR Yaris Rally1	Driver, Co-driver	H
20	(New Zealand) Hayden Paddon	(New Zealand) John Kennard	(South Korea) Hyundai Shell Mobis WRT	Hyundai i20 N Rally1	Driver, Co-driver, Manufacturer	H
33	(United Kingdom) Elfyn Evans	(United Kingdom) Scott Martin	(Japan) Toyota Gazoo Racing WRT	Toyota GR Yaris Rally1	Driver, Co-driver, Manufacturer	H
55	(Republic of Ireland) Josh McErlean	(Republic of Ireland) Eoin Treacy	(United Kingdom) M-Sport Ford WRT	Ford Puma Rally1	Driver, Co-driver, Manufacturer	H
95	(Republic of Ireland) Jon Armstrong	(Republic of Ireland) Shane Byrne	(United Kingdom) M-Sport Ford WRT	Ford Puma Rally1	Driver, Co-driver, Manufacturer	H
99	(Sweden) Oliver Solberg	(United Kingdom) Elliott Edmondson	(Japan) Toyota Gazoo Racing WRT	Toyota GR Yaris Rally1	Driver, Co-driver, Manufacturer	H

Rally2 entries competing in the WRC2 Championship
No.	Driver	Co-Driver	Entrant	Car	Championship eligibility	Tyre
21	(Estonia) Robert Virves	(Estonia) Jakko Viilo	(Germany) Toksport WRT 2	Škoda Fabia RS Rally2	Challenger Driver, Challenger Co-driver, Team	H
22	(Spain) Alejandro Cachón	(Spain) Borja Rozada	(Spain) Toyota España	Toyota GR Yaris Rally2	Challenger Driver, Co-driver	H
23	(Bulgaria) Nikolay Gryazin	(Kyrgyzstan) Konstantin Aleksandrov	(Italy) Lancia Corse HF	Lancia Ypsilon Rally2 HF Integrale	Challenger Driver, Challenger Co-driver, Team	H
24	(France) Yohan Rossel	(France) Arnaud Dunand	(Italy) Lancia Corse HF	Lancia Ypsilon Rally2 HF Integrale	Driver, Co-driver, Team	H
25	(Paraguay) Fabrizio Zaldivar	(Italy) Marcelo Der Ohannesian	(Paraguay) Fabrizio Zaldivar	Škoda Fabia RS Rally2	Challenger Driver, Challenger Co-driver	H
26	(United Kingdom) Gus Greensmith	(Sweden) Jonas Andersson	(United Kingdom) Gus Greensmith	Toyota GR Yaris Rally2	Driver, Co-driver	H
27	(Paraguay) Diego Domínguez Jr.	(Spain) Rogelio Peñate	(Paraguay) Diego Domínguez Jr.	Toyota GR Yaris Rally2	Challenger Driver, Challenger Co-driver	H
28	(Japan) Yuki Yamamoto	(Republic of Ireland) James Fulton	(Finland) Printsport	Toyota GR Yaris Rally2	Challenger Driver, Co-driver	H
29	(Australia) Taylor Gill	(Australia) Daniel Brkic	(Germany) Toksport WRT 2	Škoda Fabia RS Rally2	Challenger Driver, Challenger Co-driver, Team	H
30	(Estonia) Romet Jürgenson	(Estonia) Siim Oja	(United Kingdom) M-Sport Ford WRT	Ford Fiesta Rally2	Challenger Driver, Challenger Co-driver	H
31	(Paraguay) Andrea Lafarja	(Paraguay) Germán Maune	(Paraguay) Andrea Lafarja	Toyota GR Yaris Rally2	Challenger/Masters Driver, Challenger Co-driver	H
32	(Bolivia) Marco Bulacia	(Spain) José Murado	(Bolivia) Marco Bulacia	Škoda Fabia RS Rally2	Challenger Driver, Challenger Co-driver	H
34	(Paraguay) Alejandro Galanti	(Argentina) Marcelo Toyotoshi	(Paraguay) Alejandro Galanti	Toyota GR Yaris Rally2	Challenger Driver, Challenger Co-driver	H
35	(Paraguay) Miguel Zaldivar Jr.	(Argentina) Luis Allende	(Paraguay) Miguel Zaldivar Jr.	Škoda Fabia RS Rally2	Challenger Driver, Challenger Co-driver	H
36	(Paraguay) Gustavo Saba	(Argentina) Pablo Olmos	(Paraguay) Gustavo Saba	Toyota GR Yaris Rally2	Challenger Driver, Challenger Co-driver	H
38	(Paraguay) Augusto Bestard	(Argentina) José Díaz	(Paraguay) Augusto Bestard	Toyota GR Yaris Rally2	Challenger Driver, Challenger Co-driver	H
39	(Paraguay) Miguel Ortega	(Argentina) Diego Cagnotti	(Paraguay) Miguel Ortega	Škoda Fabia RS Rally2	Challenger/Masters Driver, Challenger/Masters Co-driver	H
40	(Paraguay) Miguel Zaldivar Sr.	(Paraguay) Juan José Sánchez	(Paraguay) Miguel Zaldivar Sr.	Škoda Fabia RS Rally2	Challenger/Masters Driver, Challenger Co-driver	H
41	(Paraguay) Franco Pappalardo	(Argentina) Juan Pablo Carrera	(Paraguay) Franco Pappalardo	Toyota GR Yaris Rally2	Challenger Driver, Challenger Co-driver	H
42	(Paraguay) Sebastian Barchini	(Argentina) Rubén García	(Paraguay) Sebastian Barchini	Škoda Fabia RS Rally2	Challenger Driver, Challenger Co-driver	H
43	(Paraguay) Eugen Gotze	(Paraguay) Juan José Bilbao	(Paraguay) Eugen Gotze	Škoda Fabia Rally2 evo	Challenger Driver, Challenger Co-driver	H
44	(Paraguay) Matías Domínguez	(Argentina) Diego Cagnotti	(Paraguay) Matías Domínguez	Škoda Fabia R5	Challenger/Masters Driver, Challenger/Masters Co-driver	H
45	(Mexico) Miguel Granados	(Spain) Marc Martí	(Mexico) Miguel Granados	Škoda Fabia RS Rally2	Challenger/Masters Driver, Masters Co-driver	H
46	(Paraguay) Miguel María García	(Paraguay) Hernán Vargas Peña	(Paraguay) Miguel María García	Toyota GR Yaris Rally2	Challenger Driver, Challenger Co-driver	H
47	(Paraguay) Cesar Pedotti	(Paraguay) Nicolas Elizaur	(Paraguay) Cesar Pedotti	Volkswagen Polo GTI R5	Challenger/Masters Driver, Challenger Co-driver	H

Rally3 entries competing in the WRC3 Championship
No.	Driver	Co-Driver	Entrant	Car	Tyre
48	(France) Ghjuvanni Rossi	(France) Kylian Sarmezan	(France) Ghjuvanni Rossi	Ford Fiesta Rally3	H
49	(France) Eric Royère	(Belgium) Maxime Andernack	(France) Eric Royère	Ford Fiesta Rally3	H
50	(Peru) André Martinez	(Peru) Matias Aranguren	(Peru) André Martinez	Ford Fiesta Rally3	H
51	(Bolivia) Nataniel Bruun	(Argentina) Mario Javier del Riego	(Bolivia) Nataniel Bruun	Ford Fiesta Rally3	H
52	(India) Naveen Puligilla	(India) Musa Sherif	(India) Naveen Puligilla	Ford Fiesta Rally3	H
53	(India) Dean Mascarenhas	(India) Gagan Karumbaiah	(India) Dean Mascarenhas	Ford Fiesta Rally3	H
54	(Peru) Eduardo Castro	(Chile) Javiera Roman	(Peru) Eduardo Castro	Ford Fiesta Rally3	H

Other major entries
No.	Driver	Co-Driver	Entrant	Car	Championship eligibility	Tyre
37	(Paraguay) Fabrizio Galanti	(Uruguay) Sebastián González	(Paraguay) Fabrizio Galanti	Toyota GR Yaris Rally2	—N/a	H
60	(Peru) Jorge Martínez	(Argentina) Marcelo Brizio	(Peru) Jorge Martínez	Ford Fiesta Rally3	Masters Driver, Masters Co-driver	H

=== Itinerary ===
All dates and times are UYT (UTC-3).

Date	No.	Time span	Stage name	Distance
27 August	—	After 11:01	Carmen del Parana [Shakedown]	5.60 km
27 August		After 19:00	Opening ceremony, Encarnación	—N/a
28 August	SS1	After 9:03	Cambyretá 1	24.65 km
28 August	SS2	After 9:56	Nueva Alborada 1	15.66 km
28 August	SS3	After 10:49	Yerbatera 1	33.88 km
28 August	SS4	After 11:50	Autódromo 1	2.50 km
28 August		12:26 – 13:06	Regroup, Encarnación	—N/a
28 August		13:06 – 13:36	Service A, Encarnación	—N/a
28 August	SS5	After 13:34	Cambyretá 2	24.65 km
28 August	SS6	After 14:32	Nueva Alborada 2	15.66 km
28 August	SS7	After 15:31	Yerbatera 2	33.88 km
28 August	SS8	After 16:44	Autódromo 2	2.50 km
28 August		18:04 – 18:49	Flexi service B, Encarnación	—N/a
29 August	SS9	After 8:19	Bella Vista 1	21.15 km
29 August	SS10	After 9:12	Bella Vista Sur 1	11.57 km
29 August	SS11	After 10:05	Hohenau 1	19.40 km
29 August	SS12	After 11:02	Trinidad 1	15.00 km
29 August		11:57 – 12:17	Regroup, Encarnación	—N/a
29 August		12:17 – 12:47	Service C, Encarnación	—N/a
29 August	SS13	After 14:16	Bella Vista 2	21.15 km
29 August	SS14	After 15:09	Bella Vista Sur 2	11.57 km
29 August	SS15	After 16:05	Hohenau 2	19.40 km
29 August	SS16	After 17:02	Trinidad 2	15.00 km
29 August	SS17	After 18:05	Encarnación Costanera	3.10 km
29 August		18:37 – 19:22	Flexi service D, Encarnación	—N/a
30 August	SS18	After 7:05	Encarnación 1	10.26 km
30 August	SS19	After 8:38	Artigas 1	19.60 km
30 August		9:18 – 10:28	Regroup, Artigas	—N/a
30 August	SS20	After 10:51	Artigas Oeste	8.44 km
30 August	SS21	After 11:43	Artigas 2	19.60 km
30 August		13:09 – 13:59	Regroup, Encarnación	—N/a
30 August	SS22	After 14:15	Encarnación 2 [Power Stage]	10.26 km
30 August		After 14:35	Podium ceremony, Molino San Jose	—N/a
30 August		After 14:55	Official finish, Molino San Jose	—N/a

== Report ==
=== WRC Rally1 ===
==== Classification ====
Position		No.	Driver	Co-driver	Entrant	Car	Time	Difference	Points			
Event	Class	No.	Driver	Co-driver	Entrant	Car	Time	Difference	Event	Sunday	Stage	Total
1	1	5	Sami Pajari	Marko Salminen	Toyota Gazoo Racing WRT2	Toyota GR Yaris Rally1	3:13:28.5	0.0	25	0	0	25
2	2	20	Hayden Paddon	John Kennard	Hyundai Shell Mobis WRT	Hyundai i20 N Rally1	3:13:54.3	+25.8	17	0	0	17
3	3	16	Adrien Fourmaux	Alexandre Coria	Hyundai Shell Mobis WRT	Hyundai i20 N Rally1	3:14:08.5	+40.0	15	2	3	20
4	4	33	Elfyn Evans	Scott Martin	Toyota Gazoo Racing WRT	Toyota GR Yaris Rally1	3:14:13.6	+45.1	12	1	2	15
5	5	99	Oliver Solberg	Elliott Edmondson	Toyota Gazoo Racing WRT	Toyota GR Yaris Rally1	3:16:25.5	+2:57.0	10	4	5	19
6	6	55	Josh McErlean	Eoin Treacy	M-Sport Ford WRT	Ford Puma Rally1	3:17:47.5	+4:19.0	8	0	0	8
34	7	1	Sébastien Ogier	Julien Ingrassia	Toyota Gazoo Racing WRT	Toyota GR Yaris Rally1	4:17:10.1	+1:03:41.6	0	5	4	9
37	8	11	Thierry Neuville	Martijn Wydaeghe	Hyundai Shell Mobis WRT	Hyundai i20 N Rally1	4:25:17.8	+1:11:49.3	0	3	1	4
Retired SS21		18	Takamoto Katsuta	Aaron Johnston	Toyota Gazoo Racing WRT	Toyota GR Yaris Rally1	Accident		0	0	0	0
Retired SS21		95	Jon Armstrong	Shane Byrne	M-Sport Ford WRT	Ford Puma Rally1	Suspension		0	0	0	0

==== Special stages ====
Stage	Winners	Car	Time	Class leaders
SD	Katsuta / Johnston	Toyota GR Yaris Rally1	2:59.5	—N/a
SS1	Solberg / Edmondson	Toyota GR Yaris Rally1	14:06.4	Solberg / Edmondson
SS2	Solberg / Edmondson	Toyota GR Yaris Rally1	8:52.1	Solberg / Edmondson
SS3	Paddon / Kennard	Hyundai i20 N Rally1	19:22.0	Paddon / Kennard
SS4	Fourmaux / Coria	Hyundai i20 N Rally1	1:53.0	Paddon / Kennard
SS5	Fourmaux / Coria	Hyundai i20 N Rally1	13:53.1	Paddon / Kennard
SS6	Fourmaux / Coria	Hyundai i20 N Rally1	8:39.3	Paddon / Kennard
SS7	Pajari / Salminen	Toyota GR Yaris Rally1	19:00.8	Pajari / Salminen
SS8	Fourmaux / Coria	Hyundai i20 N Rally1	1:51.0	Pajari / Salminen
SS9	Evans / Martin	Toyota GR Yaris Rally1	11:12.1	Pajari / Salminen
SS10	Fourmaux / Coria	Hyundai i20 N Rally1	7:40.6	Pajari / Salminen
SS11	Fourmaux / Coria	Hyundai i20 N Rally1	10:27.4	Pajari / Salminen
SS12	Ogier / Landais	Toyota GR Yaris Rally1	9:03.2	Pajari / Salminen
SS13	Fourmaux / Coria	Hyundai i20 N Rally1	11:08.5	Pajari / Salminen
SS14	Fourmaux / Coria	Hyundai i20 N Rally1	7:33.6	Pajari / Salminen
SS15	Fourmaux / Coria	Hyundai i20 N Rally1	10:16.6	Pajari / Salminen
SS16	Ogier / Landais	Toyota GR Yaris Rally1	8:48.1	Pajari / Salminen
SS17	Katsuta / Johnston	Toyota GR Yaris Rally1	2:48.7	Pajari / Salminen
SS18	Ogier / Landais	Toyota GR Yaris Rally1	5:46.6	Pajari / Salminen
SS19	Solberg / Edmondson	Toyota GR Yaris Rally1	9:25.3	Pajari / Salminen
SS20	Solberg / Edmondson	Toyota GR Yaris Rally1	3:30.9	Pajari / Salminen
SS21	stage cancelled			
SS22	Solberg / Edmondson	Toyota GR Yaris Rally1	5:42.2	Pajari / Salminen

==== Championship standings ====
Drivers' Standings
Move	Pos.	Driver	Points
	1	Elfyn Evans	216
	2	Sami Pajari	196
1	3	Oliver Solberg	175
1	4	Takamoto Katsuta	160
1	5	Adrien Fourmaux	149

Co-drivers' Standings
Move	Pos.	Driver	Points
	1	Scott Martin	216
	2	Marko Salminen	196
1	3	Elliott Edmondson	175
1	4	Aaron Johnston	160
1	5	Alexandre Coria	149

Manufacturers' Standings
Move	Pos.	Driver	Points
	1	Toyota Gazoo Racing WRT	554
	2	Hyundai Shell Mobis WRT	381
	3	Toyota Gazoo Racing WRT2	210
	4	M-Sport Ford WRT	138

=== WRC2 Rally2 ===
==== Classification ====
Position		No.	Driver	Co-driver	Entrant	Car	Time	Difference	Points	
Event	Class	No.	Driver	Co-driver	Entrant	Car	Time	Difference	Class	Event
7	1	27	Diego Domínguez Jr.	Rogelio Peñate	Diego Domínguez Jr.	Toyota GR Yaris Rally2	3:21:09.0	0.0	25	6
8	2	26	Gus Greensmith	Jonas Andersson	Gus Greensmith	Toyota GR Yaris Rally2	3:21:31.7	+22.7	17	4
9	3	34	Alejandro Galanti	Marcelo Toyotoshi	Alejandro Galanti	Toyota GR Yaris Rally2	3:23:51.5	+2:42.5	15	2
10	4	29	Taylor Gill	Daniel Brkic	Toksport WRT 2	Škoda Fabia RS Rally2	3:24:05.4	+2:56.4	12	1
11	5	23	Nikolay Gryazin	Konstantin Aleksandrov	Lancia Corse HF	Lancia Ypsilon Rally2 HF Integrale	3:25:25.3	+4:16.3	10	0
12	6	24	Yohan Rossel	Arnaud Dunand	Lancia Corse HF	Lancia Ypsilon Rally2 HF Integrale	3:25:35.4	+4:26.4	8	0
13	7	35	Miguel Zaldivar Jr.	Luis Allende	Miguel Zaldivar Jr.	Škoda Fabia RS Rally2	3:26:55.0	+5:46.0	6	0
14	8	38	Augusto Bestard	José Díaz	Augusto Bestard	Toyota GR Yaris Rally2	3:30:07.2	+8:58.2	4	0
15	9	25	Fabrizio Zaldivar	Marcelo Der Ohannesian	Fabrizio Zaldivar	Škoda Fabia RS Rally2	3:31:16.3	+10:07.3	2	0
16	10	40	Miguel Zaldivar Sr.	Juan José Sánchez	Miguel Zaldivar Sr.	Škoda Fabia RS Rally2	3:34:52.1	+13:43.1	1	0
17	11	39	Miguel Ortega	Diego Cagnotti	Miguel Ortega	Škoda Fabia RS Rally2	3:35:17.3	+14:08.3	0	0
18	12	45	Miguel Granados	Marc Martí	Miguel Granados	Škoda Fabia RS Rally2	3:38:18.1	+17:09.1	0	0
20	13	31	Andrea Lafarja	Germán Maune	Andrea Lafarja	Toyota GR Yaris Rally2	3:51:31.1	+30:22.1	0	0
21	14	28	Yuki Yamamoto	James Fulton	Printsport	Toyota GR Yaris Rally2	3:52:23.7	+31:14.7	0	0
22	15	42	Sebastian Barchini	Rubén García	Sebastian Barchini	Škoda Fabia RS Rally2	3:54:10.6	+33:01.6	0	0
30	16	43	Eugen Gotze	Juan José Bilbao	Eugen Gotze	Škoda Fabia Rally2 evo	4:06:13.5	+45:04.5	0	0
33	17	47	Cesar Pedotti	Nicolas Elizaur	Cesar Pedotti	Volkswagen Polo GTI R5	4:14:48.1	+53:39.1	0	0
36	18	21	Robert Virves	Jakko Viilo	Toksport WRT 2	Škoda Fabia RS Rally2	4:23:54.1	+1:02:45.1	0	0
Retired SS22		30	Romet Jürgenson	Siim Oja	M-Sport Ford WRT	Ford Fiesta Rally2	Accident		0	0
Retired SS20		32	Marco Bulacia	José Murado	Marco Bulacia	Škoda Fabia RS Rally2	Withdrawn		0	0
Retired SS20		36	Gustavo Saba	Pablo Olmos	Gustavo Saba	Toyota GR Yaris Rally2	Withdrawn		0	0
Retired SS5		44	Matías Domínguez	Diego Cagnotti	Matías Domínguez	Škoda Fabia R5	Withdrawn		0	0
Retired SS1		22	Alejandro Cachón	Borja Rozada	Toyota España	Toyota GR Yaris Rally2	Rolled		0	0

==== Special stages ====
Overall
Stage	Winners	Car	Time	Class leaders
SD	Jürgenson / Oja	Ford Fiesta Rally2	3:08.2	—N/a
SS1	Domínguez Jr. / Peñate	Toyota GR Yaris Rally2	14:39.5	Domínguez Jr. / Peñate
SS2	Domínguez Jr. / Peñate	Toyota GR Yaris Rally2	9:11.0	Domínguez Jr. / Peñate
SS3	Domínguez Jr. / Peñate	Toyota GR Yaris Rally2	20:02.5	Domínguez Jr. / Peñate
SS4	Saba / Olmos	Toyota GR Yaris Rally2	1:56.7	Domínguez Jr. / Peñate
SS5	Domínguez Jr. / Peñate	Toyota GR Yaris Rally2	14:28.8	Domínguez Jr. / Peñate
SS6	Rossel / Dunand	Lancia Ypsilon Rally2 HF Integrale	9:02.2	Domínguez Jr. / Peñate
SS7	Zaldivar / Der Ohannesian	Škoda Fabia RS Rally2	19:42.3	Domínguez Jr. / Peñate
SS8	Rossel / Dunand	Lancia Ypsilon Rally2 HF Integrale	1:54.4	Domínguez Jr. / Peñate
SS9	Zaldivar / Der Ohannesian	Škoda Fabia RS Rally2	11:36.	Domínguez Jr. / Peñate
SS10	Virves / Viilo	Škoda Fabia RS Rally2	7:54.7	Domínguez Jr. / Peñate
SS11	Virves / Viilo	Škoda Fabia RS Rally2	10:52.1	Domínguez Jr. / Peñate
SS12	Virves / Viilo	Škoda Fabia RS Rally2	9:23.3	Domínguez Jr. / Peñate
SS13	Virves / Viilo	Škoda Fabia RS Rally2	11:35.8	Domínguez Jr. / Peñate
SS14	Gryazin / Aleksandrov	Lancia Ypsilon Rally2 HF Integrale	7:48.3	Domínguez Jr. / Peñate
SS15	Virves / Viilo	Škoda Fabia RS Rally2	10:40.8	Domínguez Jr. / Peñate
SS16	Virves / Viilo	Škoda Fabia RS Rally2	9:10.4	Domínguez Jr. / Peñate
SS17	Domínguez Jr. / Peñate	Toyota GR Yaris Rally2	3:11.9	Domínguez Jr. / Peñate
SS18	Rossel / Dunand	Lancia Ypsilon Rally2 HF Integrale	6:12.9	Domínguez Jr. / Peñate
SS19	Virves / Viilo	Škoda Fabia RS Rally2	9:52.9	Domínguez Jr. / Peñate
SS20	Virves / Viilo	Škoda Fabia RS Rally2	3:41.2	Domínguez Jr. / Peñate
SS21	stage cancelled			
SS22	Virves / Viilo	Škoda Fabia RS Rally2	5:59.1	Domínguez Jr. / Peñate

Challenger
Stage	Winners	Car	Time	Class leaders
SD	Jürgenson / Oja	Ford Fiesta Rally2	3:08.2	—N/a
SS1	Domínguez Jr. / Peñate	Toyota GR Yaris Rally2	14:39.5	Domínguez Jr. / Peñate
SS2	Domínguez Jr. / Peñate	Toyota GR Yaris Rally2	9:11.0	Domínguez Jr. / Peñate
SS3	Domínguez Jr. / Peñate	Toyota GR Yaris Rally2	20:02.5	Domínguez Jr. / Peñate
SS4	Saba / Olmos	Toyota GR Yaris Rally2	1:56.7	Domínguez Jr. / Peñate
SS5	Domínguez Jr. / Peñate	Toyota GR Yaris Rally2	14:28.8	Domínguez Jr. / Peñate
SS6	Zaldivar / Der Ohannesian	Škoda Fabia RS Rally2	9:02.8	Domínguez Jr. / Peñate
SS7	Zaldivar / Der Ohannesian	Škoda Fabia RS Rally2	19:42.3	Domínguez Jr. / Peñate
SS8	Gryazin / Aleksandrov	Lancia Ypsilon Rally2 HF Integrale	1:54.4	Domínguez Jr. / Peñate
SS9	Zaldivar / Der Ohannesian	Škoda Fabia RS Rally2	11:36.	Domínguez Jr. / Peñate
SS10	Virves / Viilo	Škoda Fabia RS Rally2	7:54.7	Domínguez Jr. / Peñate
SS11	Virves / Viilo	Škoda Fabia RS Rally2	10:52.1	Domínguez Jr. / Peñate
SS12	Virves / Viilo	Škoda Fabia RS Rally2	9:23.3	Domínguez Jr. / Peñate
SS13	Virves / Viilo	Škoda Fabia RS Rally2	11:35.8	Domínguez Jr. / Peñate
SS14	Gryazin / Aleksandrov	Lancia Ypsilon Rally2 HF Integrale	7:48.3	Domínguez Jr. / Peñate
SS15	Virves / Viilo	Škoda Fabia RS Rally2	10:40.8	Domínguez Jr. / Peñate
SS16	Virves / Viilo	Škoda Fabia RS Rally2	9:10.4	Domínguez Jr. / Peñate
SS17	Domínguez Jr. / Peñate	Toyota GR Yaris Rally2	3:11.9	Domínguez Jr. / Peñate
SS18	Galanti / Toyotoshi	Toyota GR Yaris Rally2	6:14.1	Domínguez Jr. / Peñate
SS19	Virves / Viilo	Škoda Fabia RS Rally2	9:52.9	Domínguez Jr. / Peñate
SS20	Virves / Viilo	Škoda Fabia RS Rally2	3:41.2	Domínguez Jr. / Peñate
SS21	stage cancelled			
SS22	Virves / Viilo	Škoda Fabia RS Rally2	5:59.1	Domínguez Jr. / Peñate

==== Championship standings ====
Drivers' Standings
Move	Pos.	Driver	Points
	1	Robert Virves	100
	2	Roope Korhonen	79
	3	Teemu Suninen	76
2	4	Nikolay Gryazin	66
1	5	Léo Rossel	64

Co-drivers' Standings
Move	Pos.	Driver	Points
	1	Jakko Viilo	100
	2	Anssi Viinikka	79
	3	Janni Hussi	76
2	4	Konstantin Aleksandrov	66
1	5	Guillaume Mercoiret	64

Manufacturers' Standings
Move	Pos.	Driver	Points
	1	Toksport WRT	235
	2	Lancia Corse HF	227
	3	M-Sport Ford WRT	45
New entry	4	Toksport WRT 2	37
1	5	2C Junior Team	37

Challenger Drivers' Standings
Move	Pos.	Driver	Points
	1	Robert Virves	100
	2	Roope Korhonen	94
	3	Léo Rossel	81
1	4	Nikolay Gryazin	76
1	5	Alejandro Cachón	74

Challenger Co-drivers' Standings
Move	Pos.	Driver	Points
	1	Jakko Viilo	100
	2	Anssi Viinikka	99
	3	Guillaume Mercoiret	85
	4	Konstantin Aleksandrov	79
4	5	Rogelio Peñate	59

=== WRC3 Rally3 ===
==== Classification ====
Position		No.	Driver	Co-driver	Entrant	Car	Time	Difference	Points
Event	Class	No.	Driver	Co-driver	Entrant	Car	Time	Difference	Points
19	1	51	Nataniel Bruun	Mario Javier del Riego	Nataniel Bruun	Ford Fiesta Rally3	2:48:29.0	0.0	25
23	2	49	Eric Royère	Maxime Andernack	Eric Royère	Ford Fiesta Rally3	3:57:05.2	+15:02.9	17
42	3	52	Naveen Puligilla	Musa Sherif	Naveen Puligilla	Ford Fiesta Rally3	5:10:54.9	+1:28:52.6	15
Retired SS20		53	Dean Mascarenhas	Gagan Karumbaiah	Dean Mascarenhas	Ford Fiesta Rally3	Accident		0
Retired SS16		50	André Martinez	Matias Aranguren	André Martinez	Ford Fiesta Rally3	Withdrawn		0
Retired SS9		48	Ghjuvanni Rossi	Kylian Sarmezan	Ghjuvanni Rossi	Ford Fiesta Rally3	Withdrawn		0
Retired SS1		54	Eduardo Castro	Javiera Roman	Eduardo Castro	Ford Fiesta Rally3	Mechanical		0

==== Special stages ====
Stage	Winners	Car	Time	Class leaders
SD	Martinez / Aranguren	Ford Fiesta Rally3	3:25.3	—N/a
SS1	Bruun / del Riego	Ford Fiesta Rally3	16:10.5	Bruun / del Riego
SS2	Bruun / del Riego	Ford Fiesta Rally3	10:06.7	Bruun / del Riego
SS3	Bruun / del Riego	Ford Fiesta Rally3	22:15.4	Bruun / del Riego
SS4	Rossi / Sarmezan	Ford Fiesta Rally3	2:03.1	Bruun / del Riego
SS5	Rossi / Sarmezan	Ford Fiesta Rally3	16:08.9	Bruun / del Riego
SS6	Rossi / Sarmezan	Ford Fiesta Rally3	9:50.6	Bruun / del Riego
SS7	Rossi / Sarmezan	Ford Fiesta Rally3	21:38.7	Bruun / del Riego
SS8	Rossi / Sarmezan	Ford Fiesta Rally3	2:00.4	Bruun / del Riego
SS9	Bruun / del Riego	Ford Fiesta Rally3	12:36.5	Bruun / del Riego
SS10	Bruun / del Riego	Ford Fiesta Rally3	8:50.0	Bruun / del Riego
SS11	Martinez / Aranguren	Ford Fiesta Rally3	11:55.3	Bruun / del Riego
SS12	Martinez / Aranguren	Ford Fiesta Rally3	10:20.7	Bruun / del Riego
SS13	Bruun / del Riego	Ford Fiesta Rally3	12:44.3	Bruun / del Riego
SS14	Martinez / Aranguren	Ford Fiesta Rally3	8:38.9	Bruun / del Riego
SS15	Martinez / Aranguren	Ford Fiesta Rally3	11:49.5	Bruun / del Riego
SS16	Bruun / del Riego	Ford Fiesta Rally3	10:38.3	Bruun / del Riego
SS17	Bruun / del Riego	Ford Fiesta Rally3	3:45.0	Bruun / del Riego
SS18	Mascarenhas / Karumbaiah	Ford Fiesta Rally3	7:04.1	Bruun / del Riego
SS19	Bruun / del Riego	Ford Fiesta Rally3	11:06.9	Bruun / del Riego
SS20	Bruun / del Riego	Ford Fiesta Rally3	4:03.6	Bruun / del Riego
SS21	stage cancelled			
SS22	Bruun / del Riego	Ford Fiesta Rally3	6:39.2	Bruun / del Riego

==== Championship standings ====
Drivers' Standings
Move	Pos.	Driver	Points
	1	Matteo Fontana	117
	2	Gil Membrado	91
	3	Tymoteusz Abramowski	91
6	4	Nataniel Bruun	61
3	5	Eric Royère	58

Co-drivers' Standings
Move	Pos.	Driver	Points
	1	Alessandro Arnaboldi	117
	2	Adrián Pérez	91
	3	Jakub Wróbel	91
	4	Oytun Albayrak	56
	5	Kylian Sarmezan	55

Previous rally: 2026 Rally Finland	2026 FIA World Rally Championship	Next rally: 2026 Rally Chile
Previous rally: 2025 Rally del Paraguay	2026 Rally del Paraguay	Next rally: 2027 Rally del Paraguay
