= 2025 Safari Rally =

73rd edition of Kenyan automobile rally

2025 Safari Rally Safari Rally Kenya 2025
Round 3 of 14 in the 2025 World Rally Championship
← Previous event	Next event →
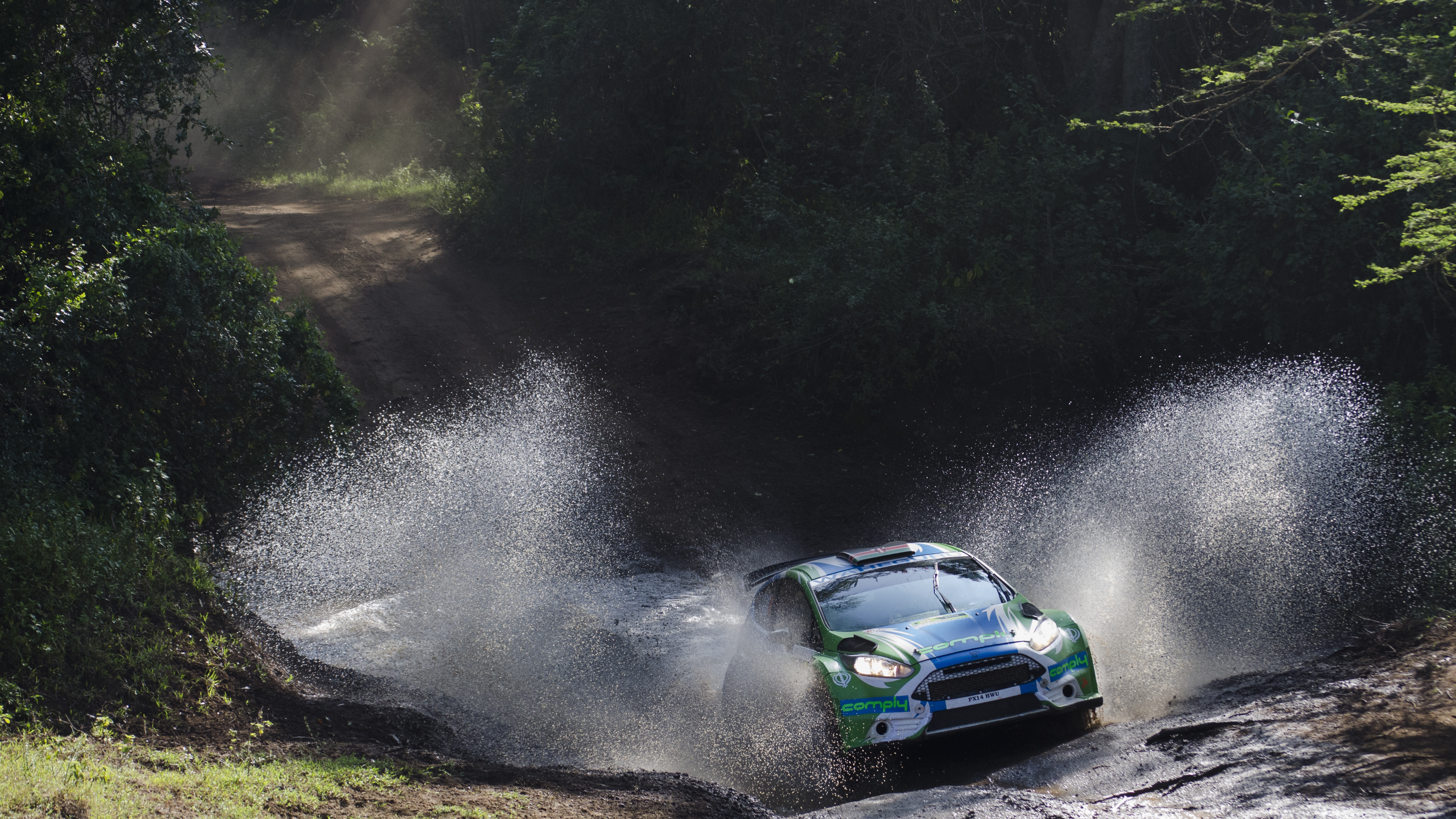
- The rally is featured with rocky and rutted tracks and unpredictable weather.
- Host country: Kenya
- Rally base: Naivasha, Nakuru County
- Dates run: 20 – 23 March 2025
- Start location: Kasarani, Nairobi
- Finish location: Hell's Gate National Park, Naivasha
- Stages: 21 (384.86 km; 239.14 miles)
- Stage surface: Gravel
- Transport distance: 1,018.77 km (633.03 miles)
- Overall distance: 1,403.63 km (872.18 miles)

Statistics
- Crews registered: 39
- Crews: 30 at start, 21 at finish

Overall results
- Overall winner: (United Kingdom) Elfyn Evans (United Kingdom) Scott Martin (Japan) Toyota Gazoo Racing WRT; 4:20:03.8
- Sunday Accumulated leader: (France) Adrien Fourmaux (France) Alexandre Coria (South Korea) Hyundai Shell Mobis WRT; 40:21.2
- Power Stage winner: (France) Adrien Fourmaux (France) Alexandre Coria (South Korea) Hyundai Shell Mobis WRT; 5:38.2

Support category results
- WRC-2 winner: (United Kingdom) Gus Greensmith (Sweden) Jonas Andersson; 4:34:15.4
- WRC-3 winner: (Kenya) Nikhil Sachania (Kenya) Deep Patel; 7:04:36.9

The 2025 Safari Rally (also known as the Safari Rally Kenya 2025) was a motor racing event for rally cars held over four days from 20 to 23 March 2025. It marked the seventy-third running of the Safari Rally, and was the third round of the 2025 World Rally Championship, 2025 WRC2 Championship and 2025 WRC3 Championship. The 2025 event was based in Naivasha in the Nakuru County, and was consisted of twenty-one special stages, covering a total competitive distance of 384.86 km (239.14 mi).

Kalle Rovanperä and Jonne Halttunen were the defending rally winners, and Toyota Gazoo Racing WRT were the defending manufacturer's winners. Gus Greensmith and Jonas Andersson were the defending rally winners in the WRC2 championship. Hamza Anwar and Adnan Din were the defending rally winners in the WRC3 championship.

Elfyn Evans and Scott Martin won the rally, and their team, Toyota Gazoo Racing WRT successfully defended their titles. Greensmith and Andersson successfully defended their titles in the WRC2 category. Nikhil Sachania and Deep Patel were the winners in the WRC3 category.

== Background ==
=== Entry list ===
The following crews entered into the rally. The event was opened to crews competing in the World Rally Championship, its support categories, the WRC2 Championship, the WRC3 Championship and privateer entries that were not registered to score points in any championship. Ten entered under Rally1 regulations, as were sixteen Rally2 crews in the WRC2 Championship and two Rally3 crew in the WRC3 Championship.

Rally1 entries competing in the World Rally Championship
No.	Driver	Co-Driver	Entrant	Car	Championship eligibility	Tyre
1	(Belgium) Thierry Neuville	(Belgium) Martijn Wydaeghe	(South Korea) Hyundai Shell Mobis WRT	Hyundai i20 N Rally1	Driver, Co-driver, Manufacturer	H
5	(Finland) Sami Pajari	(Finland) Marko Salminen	(Japan) Toyota Gazoo Racing WRT2	Toyota GR Yaris Rally1	Driver, Co-driver, Manufacturer	H
8	(Estonia) Ott Tänak	(Estonia) Martin Järveoja	(South Korea) Hyundai Shell Mobis WRT	Hyundai i20 N Rally1	Driver, Co-driver, Manufacturer	H
9	(Greece) Jourdan Serderidis	(Belgium) Frédéric Miclotte	(United Kingdom) M-Sport Ford WRT	Ford Puma Rally1	Driver, Co-driver	H
13	(Luxembourg) Grégoire Munster	(Belgium) Louis Louka	(United Kingdom) M-Sport Ford WRT	Ford Puma Rally1	Driver, Co-driver, Manufacturer	H
16	(France) Adrien Fourmaux	(France) Alexandre Coria	(South Korea) Hyundai Shell Mobis WRT	Hyundai i20 N Rally1	Driver, Co-driver, Manufacturer	H
18	(Japan) Takamoto Katsuta	(Republic of Ireland) Aaron Johnston	(Japan) Toyota Gazoo Racing WRT	Toyota GR Yaris Rally1	Driver, Co-driver, Manufacturer	H
33	(United Kingdom) Elfyn Evans	(United Kingdom) Scott Martin	(Japan) Toyota Gazoo Racing WRT	Toyota GR Yaris Rally1	Driver, Co-driver, Manufacturer	H
55	(Republic of Ireland) Josh McErlean	(Republic of Ireland) Eoin Treacy	(United Kingdom) M-Sport Ford WRT	Ford Puma Rally1	Driver, Co-driver, Manufacturer	H
69	(Finland) Kalle Rovanperä	(Finland) Jonne Halttunen	(Japan) Toyota Gazoo Racing WRT	Toyota GR Yaris Rally1	Driver, Co-driver, Manufacturer	H

Rally2 entries competing in the WRC2 Championship
No.	Driver	Co-Driver	Entrant	Car	Championship eligibility	Tyre
20	(Sweden) Oliver Solberg	(United Kingdom) Elliott Edmondson	(Finland) Printsport	Toyota GR Yaris Rally2	Driver, Co-driver	H
21	(Paraguay) Fabrizio Zaldivar	(Italy) Marcelo Der Ohannesian	(Paraguay) Fabrizio Zaldivar	Škoda Fabia RS Rally2	Challenger Driver, Challenger Co-driver	H
22	(United Kingdom) Gus Greensmith	(Sweden) Jonas Andersson	(United Kingdom) Gus Greensmith	Škoda Fabia RS Rally2	Driver, Co-driver	H
23	(Spain) Jan Solans	(Spain) Rodrigo Sanjuan de Eusebio	(Spain) PH.Ph	Toyota GR Yaris Rally2	Driver, Co-driver	H
24	(Poland) Kajetan Kajetanowicz	(Poland) Maciej Szczepaniak	(Poland) Kajetan Kajetanowicz	Toyota GR Yaris Rally2	Challenger Driver, Challenger Co-driver	H
25	(Paraguay) Diego Dominguez Jr.	(Spain) Rogelio Peñate	(Paraguay) Diego Dominguez Jr.	Toyota GR Yaris Rally2	Challenger Driver, Challenger Co-driver	H
26	(Kenya) Karan Patel	(Kenya) Tauseef Khan	(Kenya) Karan Patel	Škoda Fabia R5	Challenger Driver, Challenger Co-driver	H
27	(Poland) Daniel Chwist	(Poland) Kamil Heller	(Poland) Daniel Chwist	Škoda Fabia RS Rally2	Challenger Driver, Challenger Co-driver	H
28	(Kenya) Carl Tundo	(Kenya) Tim Jessop	(Kenya) Carl Tundo	Ford Fiesta R5	Challenger/Master Driver, Challenger Co-driver	H
29	(Kenya) Jeremiah Wahome	(Kenya) Victor Okundi	(Kenya) Jeremiah Wahome	Škoda Fabia RS Rally2	Challenger Driver, Challenger Co-driver	H
30	(Kenya) Hamza Anwar	(Kenya) Adnan Din	(Kenya) Hamza Anwar	Ford Fiesta R5	Challenger Driver, Challenger Co-driver	H
31	(Spain) Miguel Díaz-Aboitiz	(Spain) Miquel Ibáñez Sotos	(Spain) Miguel Díaz-Aboitiz	Škoda Fabia Rally2 evo	Challenger/Masters Driver, Challenger Co-driver	H
32	(Greece) George Vassilakis	(United Kingdom) Allan Harryman	(Greece) George Vassilakis	Ford Fiesta Rally2	Challenger/Masters Driver, Challenger/Masters Co-driver	H
34	(Kenya) Samman Singh Vohra	(United Kingdom) Drew Sturrock	(Kenya) Samman Singh Vohra	Škoda Fabia Rally2 evo	Challenger Driver, Challenger Co-driver	H
35	(Argentina) Fernando Álvarez Castellano	(Argentina) José Luis Díaz	(Argentina) Fernando Álvarez Castellano	Škoda Fabia RS Rally2	Challenger Driver, Challenger Co-driver	H
36	(Kenya) Aakif Virani	(Kenya) Zahir Shah	(Kenya) Aakif Virani	Škoda Fabia R5	Challenger/Masters Driver, Challenger Co-driver	H

Rally3 entries competing in the WRC3 Championship
No.	Driver	Co-Driver	Entrant	Car	Tyre
37	(Kenya) Nikhil Sachania	(Kenya) Deep Patel	(Kenya) Nikhil Sachania	Ford Fiesta Rally3	H
38	(India) Naveen Puligilla	(India) Musa Sherif	(India) Naveen Puligilla	Ford Fiesta Rally3	H

=== Itinerary ===
All dates and times are EAT (UTC+3).

Date	No.	Time span	Stage name	Distance
19 March	—	After 10:01	Sleeping Warrior [Shakedown]	5.00 km
20 March		After 11:26	Opening ceremony, Kenyatta International Convention Centre	—N/a
20 March	SS1	After 13:05	Super Special Kasarani	4.76 km
20 March	SS2	After 15:58	Mzabibu 1	8.15 km
21 March		6:15 – 6:30	Service A, WRTI Naivasha	—N/a
21 March	SS3	After 7:08	Camp Moran 1	32.20 km
21 March	SS4	After 8:56	Loldia 1	19.11 km
21 March	SS5	After 10:14	Geothermal 1	13.12 km
21 March	SS6	After 11:02	Kedong 1	15.10 km
21 March		10:49 – 11:19	Regroup, WRTI Naivasha	—N/a
21 March		11:19 – 11:59	Service B, WRTI Naivasha	—N/a
21 March	SS7	After 12:57	Camp Moran 2	32.20 km
21 March	SS8	After 14:25	Loldia 2	19.11 km
21 March	SS9	After 15:43	Geothermal 2	13.12 km
21 March	SS10	After 16:31	Kedong 2	15.10 km
21 March		17:16 – 18:01	Flexi Service C, WRTI Naivasha	—N/a
22 March	SS11	After 8:41	Sleeping Warrior 1	26.88 km
22 March	SS12	After 9:35	Elmenteita 1	17.31 km
22 March	SS13	After 10:33	Soysambu 1	29.32 km
22 March		12:38 – 12:53	Regroup, WRTI Naivasha	—N/a
22 March		12:53 – 13:33	Service D, WSTI Naivasha	—N/a
22 March	SS14	After 14:59	Sleeping Warrior 2	26.88 km
22 March	SS15	After 16:05	Elmenteita 2	17.31 km
22 March	SS16	After 17:07	Soysambu 2	29.32 km
22 March		19:22 – 20:07	Flexi Service E, WSTI Naivasha	—N/a
23 March	SS17	After 7:53	Oserengoni 1	18.33 km
23 March	SS18	After 9:05	Hell's Gate 1	10.53 km
23 March		10:12 – 10:18	Regroup, WRTI Naivasha	—N/a
23 March		10:18 – 10:33	Service F, WSTI Naivasha	—N/a
23 March	SS19	After 10:56	Mzabibu 2	8.15 km
23 March	SS20	After 12:07	Oserengoni 2	18.33 km
23 March		13:16 – 13:56	Regroup, WRTI Naivasha	—N/a
23 March	SS21	After 14:15	Hell's Gate 2 [Power Stage]	10.53 km
23 March		After 15:30	Podium ceremony, WSTI Naivasha	—N/a
23 March		After 17:05	Finish, WSTI Naivasha	—N/a

== Report ==
=== WRC Rally1 ===
==== Classification ====
Position		No.	Driver	Co-driver	Entrant	Car	Time	Difference	Points			
Event	Class	No.	Driver	Co-driver	Entrant	Car	Time	Difference	Event	Sunday	Stage	Total
1	1	33	Elfyn Evans	Scott Martin	Toyota Gazoo Racing WRT	Toyota GR Yaris Rally1	4:20:03.8	0.0	25	2	0	27
2	2	8	Ott Tänak	Martin Järveoja	Hyundai Shell Mobis WRT	Hyundai i20 N Rally1	4:21:13.7	+1:09.9	17	3	3	23
3	3	1	Thierry Neuville	Martijn Wydaeghe	Hyundai Shell Mobis WRT	Hyundai i20 N Rally1	4:23:35.8	+3:32.0	15	4	4	23
4	4	5	Sami Pajari	Marko Salminen	Toyota Gazoo Racing WRT2	Toyota GR Yaris Rally1	4:27:22.5	+7:18.7	12	0	1	13
5	5	13	Grégoire Munster	Louis Louka	M-Sport Ford WRT	Ford Puma Rally1	4:31:39.1	+11:35.3	10	0	2	12
8	6	9	Jourdan Serderidis	Frédéric Miclotte	M-Sport Ford WRT	Ford Puma Rally1	4:48:49.3	+28:45.5	4	0	0	4
10	7	55	Josh McErlean	Eoin Treacy	M-Sport Ford WRT	Ford Puma Rally1	4:57:19.6	+37:15.8	1	1	0	2
16	8	16	Adrien Fourmaux	Alexandre Coria	Hyundai Shell Mobis WRT	Hyundai i20 N Rally1	6:05:53.6	+1:45:49.8	0	5	5	10
Retired SS21		18	Takamoto Katsuta	Aaron Johnston	Toyota Gazoo Racing WRT	Toyota GR Yaris Rally1	Rolled		0	0	0	0
Retired SS18		69	Kalle Rovanperä	Jonne Halttunen	Toyota Gazoo Racing WRT	Toyota GR Yaris Rally1	Technical		0	0	0	0

==== Special stages ====
Stage	Winners	Car	Time	Class leaders
SD	Rovanperä / Halttunen	Toyota GR Yaris Rally1	4:34.5	—N/a
SS1	Evans / Martin	Toyota GR Yaris Rally1	3:09.0	Evans / Martin
SS2	Tänak / Järveoja	Hyundai i20 N Rally1	6:41.1	Tänak / Järveoja
SS3	Tänak / Järveoja	Hyundai i20 N Rally1	25:57.3	Tänak / Järveoja
SS4	Tänak / Järveoja	Hyundai i20 N Rally1	14:29.8	Tänak / Järveoja
SS5	Rovanperä / Halttunen	Toyota GR Yaris Rally1	7:03.4	Tänak / Järveoja
SS6	Tänak / Järveoja	Hyundai i20 N Rally1	7:21.4	Tänak / Järveoja
SS7	Neuville / Wydaeghe	Hyundai i20 N Rally1	25:56.9	Tänak / Järveoja
SS8	Tänak / Järveoja	Hyundai i20 N Rally1	14:23.6	Tänak / Järveoja
SS9	Rovanperä / Halttunen	Toyota GR Yaris Rally1	6:57.9	Evans / Martin
SS10	Rovanperä / Halttunen	Toyota GR Yaris Rally1	7:24.2	Evans / Martin
SS11	Evans / Martin	Toyota GR Yaris Rally1	16:20.0	Evans / Martin
SS12	Evans / Martin	Toyota GR Yaris Rally1	11:31.7	Evans / Martin
SS13	Katsuta / Johnston	Toyota GR Yaris Rally1	17:36.0	Evans / Martin
SS14	Katsuta / Johnston	Toyota GR Yaris Rally1	18:23.2	Evans / Martin
SS15	Munster / Louka	Ford Puma Rally1	11:11.4	Evans / Martin
SS16	Tänak / Järveoja	Hyundai i20 N Rally1	20:19.1	Evans / Martin
SS17	Tänak / Järveoja	Hyundai i20 N Rally1	6:43.4	Evans / Martin
SS18	Katsuta / Johnston	Toyota GR Yaris Rally1	11:11.1	Evans / Martin
SS19	Fourmaux / Coria	Hyundai i20 N Rally1	5:34.8	Evans / Martin
SS20	Katsuta / Johnston	Toyota GR Yaris Rally1	11:00.5	Evans / Martin
SS21	Fourmaux / Coria	Hyundai i20 N Rally1	5:38.2	Evans / Martin

==== Championship standings ====
Drivers' Standings
Move	Pos.	Driver	Points
	1	Elfyn Evans	88
2	2	Thierry Neuville	52
2	3	Ott Tänak	49
2	4	Sébastien Ogier	33
2	5	Adrien Fourmaux	31

Co-drivers' Standings
Move	Pos.	Driver	Points
	1	Scott Martin	88
2	2	Martijn Wydaeghe	52
2	3	Martin Järveoja	49
2	4	Vincent Landais	33
2	5	Alexandre Coria	31

Manufacturers' Standings
Move	Pos.	Driver	Points
	1	Toyota Gazoo Racing WRT	148
	2	Hyundai Shell Mobis WRT	122
	3	M-Sport Ford WRT	47
	4	Toyota Gazoo Racing WRT2	25

=== WRC2 Rally2 ===
==== Classification ====
Position		No.	Driver	Co-driver	Entrant	Car	Time	Difference	Points	
Event	Class	No.	Driver	Co-driver	Entrant	Car	Time	Difference	Class	Event
6	1	22	Gus Greensmith	Jonas Andersson	Gus Greensmith	Škoda Fabia RS Rally2	4:34:15.4	0.0	25	8
7	2	23	Jan Solans	Rodrigo Sanjuan de Eusebio	PH.Ph	Toyota GR Yaris Rally2	4:37:30.4	+3:15.0	17	6
9	3	21	Fabrizio Zaldivar	Marcelo Der Ohannesian	Fabrizio Zaldivar	Škoda Fabia RS Rally2	4:55:42.6	+21:27.2	15	2
11	4	27	Daniel Chwist	Kamil Heller	Daniel Chwist	Škoda Fabia RS Rally2	5:05:13.5	+30:58.1	12	0
12	5	20	Oliver Solberg	Elliott Edmondson	Printsport	Toyota GR Yaris Rally2	5:09:23.7	+35:08.3	10	0
13	6	24	Kajetan Kajetanowicz	Maciej Szczepaniak	Kajetan Kajetanowicz	Toyota GR Yaris Rally2	5:27:47.0	+53:31.6	8	0
14	7	28	Carl Tundo	Tim Jessop	Carl Tundo	Ford Fiesta R5	5:31:02.0	+56:46.6	6	0
15	8	29	Jeremiah Wahome	Victor Okundi	Jeremiah Wahome	Škoda Fabia RS Rally2	5:49:32.8	+1:15:17.4	4	0
17	9	31	Miguel Díaz-Aboitiz	Miquel Ibáñez Sotos	Miguel Díaz-Aboitiz	Škoda Fabia Rally2 evo	6:36:30.5	+2:02:15.1	2	0
19	10	34	Samman Singh Vohra	Drew Sturrock	Samman Singh Vohra	Škoda Fabia Rally2 evo	6:53:59.8	+2:19:44.4	1	0
Retired SS18		30	Hamza Anwar	Adnan Din	Hamza Anwar	Ford Fiesta R5	Mechanical		0	0
Retired SS17		36	Aakif Virani	Zahir Shah	Aakif Virani	Škoda Fabia R5	Retired		0	0
Retired SS14		25	Diego Dominguez Jr.	Rogelio Peñate	Diego Dominguez Jr.	Toyota GR Yaris Rally2	Engine		0	0
Retired SS13		32	George Vassilakis	Allan Harryman	George Vassilakis	Ford Fiesta Rally2	Medical reasons		0	0

==== Special stages ====
Overall
Stage	Winners	Car	Time	Class leaders
SD	Solberg / Edmondson	Toyota GR Yaris Rally2	4:47.1	—N/a
SS1	Solberg / Edmondson	Toyota GR Yaris Rally2	3:17.3	Solberg / Edmondson
SS2	Kajetanowicz / Szczepaniak	Toyota GR Yaris Rally2	6:55.0	Kajetanowicz / Szczepaniak
SS3	Solberg / Edmondson	Toyota GR Yaris Rally2	26:57.4	Solberg / Edmondson
SS4	Solberg / Edmondson	Toyota GR Yaris Rally2	15:01.5	Solberg / Edmondson
SS5	Kajetanowicz / Szczepaniak	Toyota GR Yaris Rally2	7:26.7	Solberg / Edmondson
SS6	Solberg / Edmondson	Toyota GR Yaris Rally2	7:55.0	Solberg / Edmondson
SS7	Solans / R. Sanjuan de Eusebio	Toyota GR Yaris Rally2	27:39.1	Kajetanowicz / Szczepaniak
SS8	Kajetanowicz / Szczepaniak	Toyota GR Yaris Rally2	15:02.0	Kajetanowicz / Szczepaniak
SS9	Greensmith / Andersson	Škoda Fabia RS Rally2	7:25.6	Kajetanowicz / Szczepaniak
SS10	Solans / R. Sanjuan de Eusebio	Toyota GR Yaris Rally2	7:57.4	Kajetanowicz / Szczepaniak
SS11	Zaldivar / Der Ohannesian	Škoda Fabia RS Rally2	17:14.9	Greensmith / Andersson
SS12	Zaldivar / Der Ohannesian	Škoda Fabia RS Rally2	12:01.1	Greensmith / Andersson
SS13	Solberg / Edmondson	Toyota GR Yaris Rally2	18:32.8	Solans / R. Sanjuan de Eusebio
SS14	Solberg / Edmondson	Toyota GR Yaris Rally2	19:11.1	Solans / R. Sanjuan de Eusebio
SS15	Solans / R. Sanjuan de Eusebio	Toyota GR Yaris Rally2	12:37.2	Solans / R. Sanjuan de Eusebio
SS16	Solberg / Edmondson	Toyota GR Yaris Rally2	20:46.6	Greensmith / Andersson
SS17	Solberg / Edmondson	Toyota GR Yaris Rally2	6:52.3	Greensmith / Andersson
SS18	Solberg / Edmondson	Toyota GR Yaris Rally2	11:36.7	Greensmith / Andersson
SS19	Solberg / Edmondson	Toyota GR Yaris Rally2	5:58.3	Greensmith / Andersson
SS20	Solberg / Edmondson	Toyota GR Yaris Rally2	11:33.5	Greensmith / Andersson
SS21	Solberg / Edmondson	Toyota GR Yaris Rally2	6:03.8	Greensmith / Andersson

Challenger
Stage	Winners	Car	Time	Class leaders
SD	Solans / R. Sanjuan de Eusebio	Toyota GR Yaris Rally2	4:54.5	—N/a
SS1	Zaldivar / Der Ohannesian	Škoda Fabia RS Rally2	3:18.8	Zaldivar / Der Ohannesian
SS2	Kajetanowicz / Szczepaniak	Toyota GR Yaris Rally2	6:55.0	Kajetanowicz / Szczepaniak
SS3	Kajetanowicz / Szczepaniak	Toyota GR Yaris Rally2	27:34.0	Kajetanowicz / Szczepaniak
SS4	Solans / R. Sanjuan de Eusebio	Toyota GR Yaris Rally2	15:04.5	Kajetanowicz / Szczepaniak
SS5	Kajetanowicz / Szczepaniak	Toyota GR Yaris Rally2	7:26.7	Kajetanowicz / Szczepaniak
SS6	Solans / R. Sanjuan de Eusebio	Toyota GR Yaris Rally2	7:56.3	Kajetanowicz / Szczepaniak
SS7	Solans / R. Sanjuan de Eusebio	Toyota GR Yaris Rally2	27:39.1	Kajetanowicz / Szczepaniak
SS8	Kajetanowicz / Szczepaniak	Toyota GR Yaris Rally2	15:02.0	Kajetanowicz / Szczepaniak
SS9	Kajetanowicz / Szczepaniak	Toyota GR Yaris Rally2	7:27.3	Kajetanowicz / Szczepaniak
SS10	Solans / R. Sanjuan de Eusebio	Toyota GR Yaris Rally2	7:57.4	Kajetanowicz / Szczepaniak
SS11	Zaldivar / Der Ohannesian	Škoda Fabia RS Rally2	17:14.9	Solans / R. Sanjuan de Eusebio
SS12	Zaldivar / Der Ohannesian	Škoda Fabia RS Rally2	12:01.1	Solans / R. Sanjuan de Eusebio
SS13	Zaldivar / Der Ohannesian	Škoda Fabia RS Rally2	19:01.1	Solans / R. Sanjuan de Eusebio
SS14	Zaldivar / Der Ohannesian	Škoda Fabia RS Rally2	19:52.2	Solans / R. Sanjuan de Eusebio
SS15	Solans / R. Sanjuan de Eusebio	Toyota GR Yaris Rally2	12:37.2	Solans / R. Sanjuan de Eusebio
SS16	Solans / R. Sanjuan de Eusebio	Toyota GR Yaris Rally2	22:00.2	Solans / R. Sanjuan de Eusebio
SS17	Solans / R. Sanjuan de Eusebio	Toyota GR Yaris Rally2	6:59.5	Solans / R. Sanjuan de Eusebio
SS18	Kajetanowicz / Szczepaniak	Toyota GR Yaris Rally2	12:11.9	Solans / R. Sanjuan de Eusebio
SS19	Kajetanowicz / Szczepaniak	Toyota GR Yaris Rally2	6:11.4	Solans / R. Sanjuan de Eusebio
SS20	Solans / R. Sanjuan de Eusebio	Toyota GR Yaris Rally2	12:08.1	Solans / R. Sanjuan de Eusebio
SS21	Solans / R. Sanjuan de Eusebio	Toyota GR Yaris Rally2	6:23.5	Solans / R. Sanjuan de Eusebio

==== Championship standings ====
Drivers' Standings
Move	Pos.	Driver	Points
1	1	Oliver Solberg	35
1	2	Yohan Rossel	25
New entry	3	Gus Greensmith	25
8	4	Fabrizio Zaldivar	23
2	5	Eric Camilli	17

Co-drivers' Standings
Move	Pos.	Driver	Points
1	1	Elliott Edmondson	35
1	1	Arnaud Dunand	25
New entry	3	Jonas Andersson	25
8	4	Marcelo Der Ohannesian	23
2	5	Thibault de la Haye	17

Manufacturers' Standings
Move	Pos.	Driver	Points
	1	PH Sport	42
	2	Toyota Gazoo Racing WRT NG	42
	3	Sarrazin Motorsport – Iron Lynx	27

Challenger Drivers' Standings
Move	Pos.	Driver	Points
9	1	Fabrizio Zaldivar	27
1	2	Léo Rossel	25
1	3	Roope Korhonen	25
New entry	4	Jan Solans	25
2	5	Jan Černý	17

Challenger Co-drivers' Standings
Move	Pos.	Driver	Points
9	1	Marcelo Der Ohannesian	27
1	2	Guillaume Mercoiret	25
1	3	Anssi Viinikka	25
New entry	4	Diego Sanjuan de Eusebio	25
2	5	Ondřej Krajča	17

=== WRC3 Rally3 ===
==== Classification ====
Position		No.	Driver	Co-driver	Entrant	Car	Time	Difference	Points
Event	Class	No.	Driver	Co-driver	Entrant	Car	Time	Difference	Points
20	1	37	Nikhil Sachania	Deep Patel	Nikhil Sachania	Ford Fiesta Rally3	7:04:36.9	+2:44:33.1	25
Retired SS20		38	Naveen Puligilla	Musa Sherif	Naveen Puligilla	Ford Fiesta Rally3	Mechanical		0

==== Special stages ====
Stage	Winners	Car	Time	Class leaders
SD	Puligilla / Sherif	Ford Fiesta Rally3	6:18.8	—N/a
SS1	Sachania / Patel	Ford Fiesta Rally3	4:02.1	Sachania / Patel
SS2	Puligilla / Sherif	Ford Fiesta Rally3	8:30.2	Puligilla / Sherif
SS3	Puligilla / Sherif	Ford Fiesta Rally3	35:12.4	Puligilla / Sherif
SS4	Puligilla / Sherif	Ford Fiesta Rally3	19:12.5	Puligilla / Sherif
SS5	Puligilla / Sherif	Ford Fiesta Rally3	10:08.7	Puligilla / Sherif
SS6	Puligilla / Sherif	Ford Fiesta Rally3	11:00.4	Puligilla / Sherif
SS7	Not run			Puligilla / Sherif
SS8	Not run			Puligilla / Sherif
SS9	Not run			Puligilla / Sherif
SS10	Not run			Puligilla / Sherif
SS11	Sachania / Patel	Ford Fiesta Rally3	25:01.6	Puligilla / Sherif
SS12	Puligilla / Sherif	Ford Fiesta Rally3	16:59.9	Puligilla / Sherif
SS13	Sachania / Patel	Ford Fiesta Rally3	25:21.0	Puligilla / Sherif
SS14	Sachania / Patel	Ford Fiesta Rally3	30:00.4	Puligilla / Sherif
SS15	Sachania / Patel	Ford Fiesta Rally3	17:44.8	Puligilla / Sherif
SS16	Sachania / Patel	Ford Fiesta Rally3	29:22.4	Puligilla / Sherif
SS17	Sachania / Patel	Ford Fiesta Rally3	9:03.3	Puligilla / Sherif
SS18	Sachania / Patel	Ford Fiesta Rally3	16:02.4	Puligilla / Sherif
SS19	Sachania / Patel	Ford Fiesta Rally3	8:09.9	Puligilla / Sherif
SS20	Sachania / Patel	Ford Fiesta Rally3	16:35.0	Sachania / Patel
SS21	Sachania / Patel	Ford Fiesta Rally3	8:46.0	Sachania / Patel

==== Championship standings ====
Drivers' Standings
Move	Pos.	Driver	Points
	1	Matteo Fontana	34
	2	Arthur Pelamourges	25
	3	Taylor Gill	25
New entry	4	Nikhil Sachania	25
1	5	Ghjuvanni Rossi	15

Co-drivers' Standings
Move	Pos.	Driver	Points
	1	Alessandro Arnaboldi	34
	2	Bastien Pouget	25
	3	Daniel Brkic	25
New entry	4	Deep Patel	25
1	5	Kylian Sarmezan	15

Previous rally: 2025 Rally Sweden	2025 FIA World Rally Championship	Next rally: 2025 Rally Islas Canarias
Previous rally: 2024 Safari Rally	2025 Safari Rally	Next rally: 2026 Safari Rally
