= Matteo Fontana =

Italian rally driver

Personal information
- Nationality: (Italy) Italian
- Born: 25 June 2003 (age 23)

World Rally Championship record
- Years active: 2023–present
- Co-driver: Alessandro Arnaboldi
- Rallies: 27
- Championships: 0
- Rally wins: 0
- Podiums: 0
- Stage wins: 2
- Total points: 2
- First rally: 2023 Monte Carlo Rally
- Last rally: 2026 Monte Carlo Rally

Matteo Fontana (born 25 June 2003) is an Italian rally driver. He is the champion of the 2025 WRC3 Championship.

== Biography ==
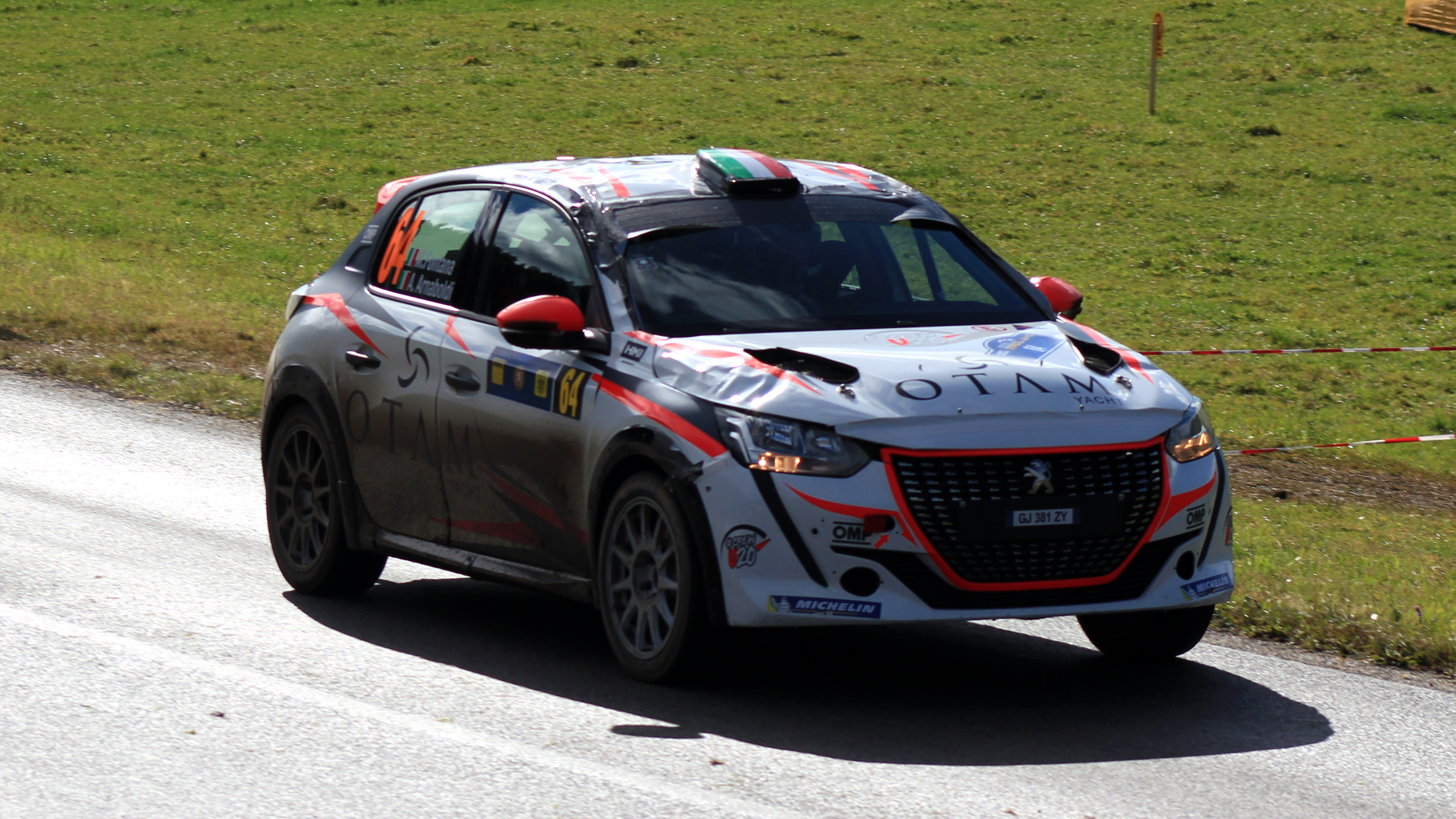
Fontana driving a Peugeot 208 Rally4 during the 2023 Central European Rally.

Fontana made his rallying debut in 2021. He started to participate in the WRC3 Championship since 2023, and won the category in 2025. Thanks to road advantages, he won his first stage wins at the 2026 Monte Carlo Rally, becoming the first driver who records a stage win in a Rally3 car. He also scored his first WRC points as well. In Rally Italia Sardegna 2026, he debuted with a Rally2 machine alongside his national campaign in the 2026 season

== Rally results ==
=== WRC results ===
Year	Entrant	Car	1	2	3	4	5	6	7	8	9	10	11	12	13	14	Pos.	Points
2023	Matteo Fontana	Peugeot 208 Rally4	MON; 44	SWE; 41	MEX	CRO; 37	POR; 39	ITA; 39	KEN	EST	FIN; 34	GRE; 28	CHL	EUR; 29	JPN		NC	0
2024	Matteo Fontana	Peugeot 208 Rally4	MON; 23	SWE; 33	KEN	CRO; 57	POR; 26			LAT; 25	FIN; 33						NC	0
2024	Matteo Fontana	Ford Fiesta Rally3						ITA; Ret	POL			GRE; 15	CHL; 33	EUR; 23	JPN		NC	0
2025	Matteo Fontana	Ford Fiesta Rally3	MON; 25	SWE; 20	KEN	ESP	POR; 62	ITA; 22	GRE; 34	EST	FIN; 25	PAR; 17	CHL; 19	EUR	JPN; 19	SAU; 17	NC	0
2026	Matteo Fontana	Ford Fiesta Rally3	MON; 31^{4}	SWE; 16	KEN	CRO; 35	ESP	POR 25	JPN	GRE 23	EST	FIN 28	PAR	CHL	ITA	SAU	16th	2
