= 2025 WRC3 Championship =

Motor racing competition

The 2025 FIA WRC3 Championship was the twelfth season of WRC3, a rallying championship for organised and governed by the Fédération Internationale de l'Automobile as the third-highest tier of international rallying. It is open to privateers and teams using cars complying with Group Rally3 regulations. The championship began in January 2025 with the Monte Carlo Rally and would conclude in November 2025 with the Rally Saudi Arabia, and runs in support of the 2025 World Rally Championship.

Diego Dominguez Jr. and Rogelio Peñate were the defending drivers' and co-drivers' champions. Matteo Fontana and Alessandro Arnaboldi became the 2025 WRC3 champions.

== Calendar ==
The 2025 season was contested over fourteen rounds across Europe, Africa, South America and Asia.

Round	Start date	Finish date	Rally	Rally headquarters	Surface	Stages	Distance	Ref.
1	23 January	26 January	(Monaco) Rallye Automobile Monte Carlo	Gap, Provence-Alpes-Côte d'Azur, France	Mixed (Note: The Monte Carlo Rally is run on a tarmac and snow surface.)	18	343.80 km	
2	13 February	16 February	Rally Sweden	Umeå, Västerbotten County, Sweden	Snow	18	300.22 km	
3	20 March	23 March	Safari Rally Kenya	Nairobi, Nairobi County, Kenya	Gravel	21	383.10 km	
4	24 April	27 April	(Spain) Rally Islas Canarias	Las Palmas, Gran Canaria, Spain	Tarmac	18	301.30 km	
5	15 May	18 May	Rally de Portugal	Matosinhos, Porto, Portugal	Gravel	24	344.50 km	
6	5 June	8 June	(Italy) Rally Italia Sardegna	Olbia, Sardinia, Italy	Gravel	16	320.24 km	
7	26 June	29 June	Acropolis Rally Greece	Lamia, Central Greece, Greece	Gravel	17	345.76 km	
8	17 July	20 July	Rally Estonia	Tartu, Tartu County, Estonia	Gravel	20	308.35 km	
9	31 July	3 August	Rally Finland	Jyväskylä, Central Finland, Finland	Gravel	20	307.22 km	
10	28 August	31 August	Rally del Paraguay	Encarnación, Itapúa, Paraguay	Gravel	19	333.18 km	
11	11 September	14 September	Rally Chile	Concepción, Biobío, Chile	Gravel	16	306.76 km	
12	16 October	19 October	(Europe) Central European Rally	Bad Griesbach, Bavaria, Germany	Tarmac	18	306.08 km	
13	6 November	9 November	Rally Japan	Toyota, Aichi, Japan	Tarmac	20	305.34 km	
14	26 November	29 November	Rally Saudi Arabia	Jeddah, Mecca Province, Saudi Arabia	Gravel	17	319.44 km	

A map showing the locations of the rallies in the 2025 championship. Event headquarters are marked with black dots.

=== Calendar changes ===
The calendar was expanded to fourteen rounds, including five flyaway events. This was originally planned for the 2024 season, but WRC Promoter GmbH retained the total of thirteen events in the hopes of attracting more Rally1 entries.

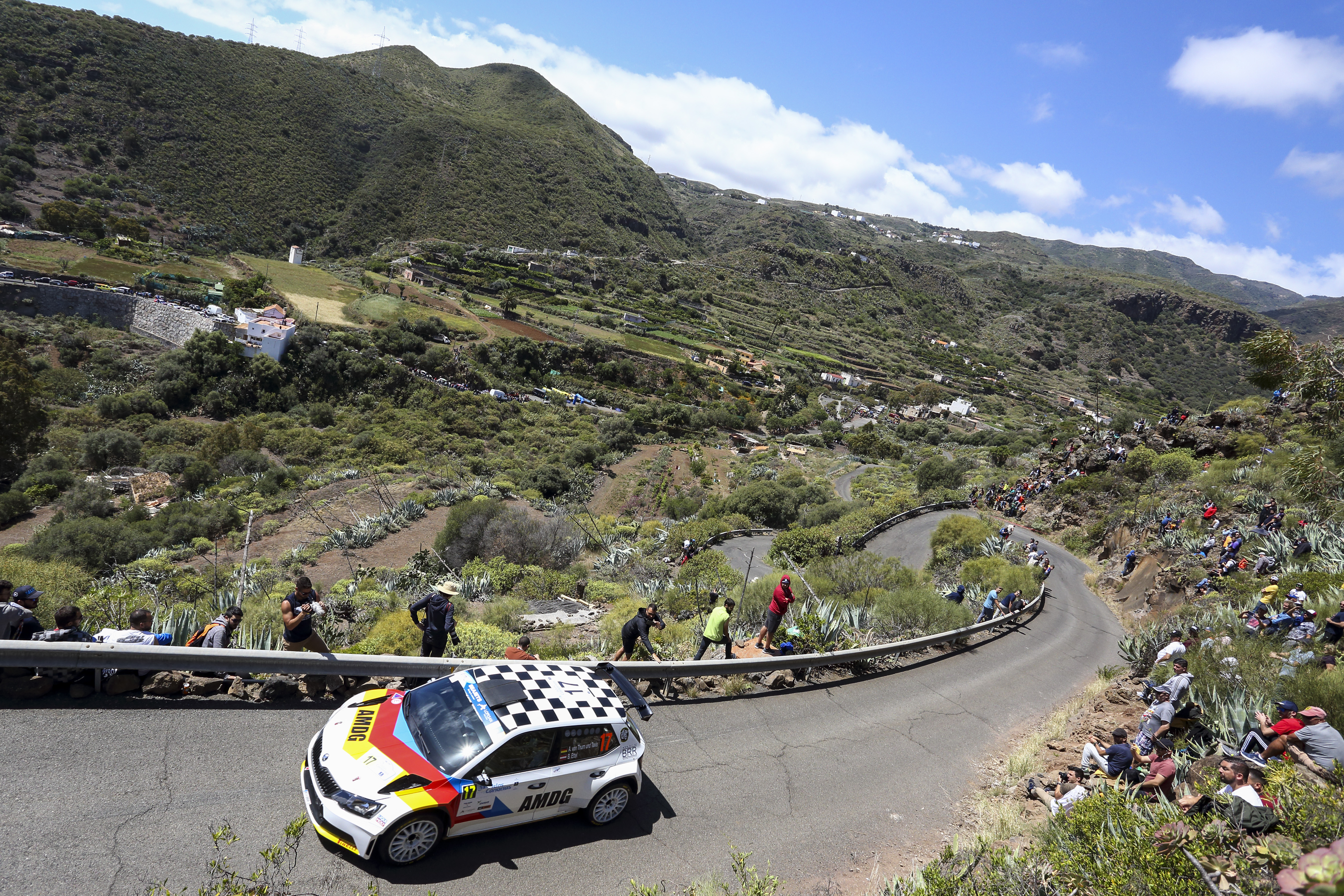
Rally Islas Canarias joined the WRC calendar.

- Rally Estonia returned to the championship after missing the 2024 season. The event replaced Rally Latvia on the calendar.
- Rally Islas Canarias was promoted from the European Rally Championship and became a World Championship event under a two-year deal. The event ran on tarmac roads.
- Rally Saudi Arabia joined the championship calendar after signing a ten-year contract with WRC Promoter GmbH. The rally was based in Jeddah, and was the season finale.
- Rally del Paraguay became a WRC event from 2025 after signing a multi-year deal, making Paraguay the thirty-eighth nation to host a WRC championship round.
- The Croatia Rally was not featured on the calendar for the first time since the event joined the championship in 2021. However, the event is set to return in 2026.
- Rally Poland was also removed from the calendar after making a one-year return to the championship in 2024.

== Entries ==
The following crews are set to enter the 2025 WRC3 Championship:

Car	Entrant	Driver name	Co-driver name	Rounds
Ford Fiesta Rally3	(Turkey) Castrol Ford Team Türkiye	(Turkey) Ali Türkkan	(Turkey) Oytun Albayrak	2, 5, 7, 9, 12
Ford Fiesta Rally3	FIA Rally Star	(Australia) Taylor Gill	(Australia) Daniel Brkic	2, 5, 7, 9, 12
Ford Fiesta Rally3	FIA Rally Star	(South Africa) Max Smart	(United Kingdom) Cameron Fair	2
Ford Fiesta Rally3	FIA Rally Star	(South Africa) Max Smart	(New Zealand) Malcolm Read	5, 7, 9, 12
Ford Fiesta Rally3	(Estonia) LightGrey Team	(Estonia) Joosep Ralf Nõgene	(Estonia) Aleks Lesk	2, 5
Ford Fiesta Rally3	(Turkey) Team Petrol Ofisi	(Turkey) Kerem Kazaz	(France) Corentin Silvestre	2, 5–9, 12
Ford Fiesta Rally3	WRC Young Driver Team	(Germany) Claire Schönborn	(Germany) Jara Hain	2, 5
Ford Fiesta Rally3	WRC Young Driver Team	(Germany) Claire Schönborn	(Germany) Michael Wenzel	7, 9, 12
Ford Fiesta Rally3	WRC Young Driver Team	(Belgium) Lyssia Baudet	(France) Léa Sam-Caw-Freve	2
Ford Fiesta Rally3	(Spain) Past Racing	(Uruguay) Federico Ensslin	(Spain) Alejandro López	5
Ford Fiesta Rally3	(Republic of Ireland) Motorsport Ireland Rally Academy	(Republic of Ireland) John Coyne	(Republic of Ireland) Killian McArdle	9
Ford Fiesta Rally3	(Finland) Team Flying Finn	(Finland) Aatu Hakalehto	(Finland) Joonas Ojala	9
Ford Fiesta Rally3	Entered under driver's name	(Paraguay) Diego Domínguez Jr.	(Spain) Rogelio Peñate	1–2, 5, 7, 9, 12
Ford Fiesta Rally3	Entered under driver's name	(France) Ghjuvanni Rossi	(France) Kylian Sarmezan	1, 4–5, 10–11
Ford Fiesta Rally3	Entered under driver's name	(Croatia) Slaven Šekuljica	(Croatia) Damir Petrović	1
Ford Fiesta Rally3	Entered under driver's name	(Croatia) Slaven Šekuljica	(Slovenia) Viljem Ošlaj	6
Ford Fiesta Rally3	Entered under driver's name	(Croatia) Slaven Šekuljica	(Croatia) Marko Šivak	12
Ford Fiesta Rally3	Entered under driver's name	(Italy) Matteo Fontana	(Italy) Alessandro Arnaboldi	1–2, 6, 10–11
Ford Fiesta Rally3	Entered under driver's name	(Sweden) Adam Grahn	(Sweden) Maja Bengtsson	2
Ford Fiesta Rally3	Entered under driver's name	(Greece) Georgios Vasilakis	(Republic of Ireland) Allan Harryman	2, 7, 10–11
Ford Fiesta Rally3	Entered under driver's name	(Peru) André Martínez	(Argentina) Matías Aranguren	2, 5–6, 8, 10–11
Ford Fiesta Rally3	Entered under driver's name	(France) Tristan Charpentier	(France) Florian Barral	2, 5
Ford Fiesta Rally3	Entered under driver's name	(Kenya) Nikhil Sachania	(Kenya) Deep Patel	3
Ford Fiesta Rally3	Entered under driver's name	(India) Naveen Puligilla	(India) Musa Sherif	3
Ford Fiesta Rally3	Entered under driver's name	(Bolivia) Nataniel Bruun	(Argentina) Pablo Olmos	4–6, 8, 10–11
Ford Fiesta Rally3	Entered under driver's name	(Poland) Igor Widłak	(Poland) Michał Marczewski	4
Ford Fiesta Rally3	Entered under driver's name	(Greece) Giorgos Delaportas	(Greece) Evangelos Panaritis	7
Ford Fiesta Rally3	Entered under driver's name	(Greece) Stephanos Theocharopoulos	(Greece) Giorgos Kotsalis	7
Ford Fiesta Rally3	Entered under driver's name	(Poland) Tymoteusz Abramowski	(Poland) Jakub Wróbel	8
Ford Fiesta Rally3	Entered under driver's name	(Poland) Grzegorz Bonder	(Poland) Łukasz Jastrzębski	8–9
Ford Fiesta Rally3	Entered under driver's name	(Peru) Eduardo Castro	(Peru) Julio Echazú	10–11
Ford Fiesta Rally3	Entered under driver's name	(Uruguay) Ignacio Gardiol	(Argentina) Ignacio Uez	11
Ford Fiesta Rally3	Entered under driver's name	(Chile) Felipe Padilla	(Chile) Sebastián Olguín	11
Ford Fiesta Rally3	Entered under driver's name	(Chile) Patricio Muñoz	(Argentina) Miguel Recalt	11
Ford Fiesta Rally3	Entered under driver's name	(Chile) Carlos Prieto	(Argentina) Juan Cruz Varela	11
Ford Fiesta Rally3	Entered under driver's name	(Chile) Eduardo Kovacs	(Argentina) Alberto Alvarez	11
Renault Clio Rally3	(Japan) Toyota Gazoo Racing WRT NG	(Japan) Takumi Matsushita	(Finland) Pekka Kelander	2, 4–5, 9
Renault Clio Rally3	(Japan) Toyota Gazoo Racing WRT NG	(Japan) Takumi Matsushita	(Finland) Ville Mannisenmäki	8
Renault Clio Rally3	(Japan) Toyota Gazoo Racing WRT NG	(Japan) Shotaro Goto	(Finland) Jussi Lindberg	2, 4–5, 8–9
Renault Clio Rally3	(Spain) C.D. Todo Sport	(Spain) Jonás Pérez	(Spain) Benito Sacramento	4
Renault Clio Rally3	Entered under driver's name	(France) Mattéo Chatillon	(France) Maxence Cornuau	1–2, 4–6, 9
Renault Clio Rally3	Entered under driver's name	(France) Arthur Pelamourgues	(France) Bastien Pouget	1, 4–5, 8–9
Renault Clio Rally3	Entered under driver's name	(France) Yanis Desangles	(France) Nicolas Théron	1
Renault Clio Rally3	Entered under driver's name	(France) Eric Royère	(France) Alexis Grenier	1–2
Renault Clio Rally3	Entered under driver's name	(Finland) Ville Vatanen	(Finland) Jarno Ottman	2, 9
Renault Clio Rally3	Entered under driver's name	(Finland) Leevi Lassila	(Finland) Antti Linnaketo	2, 9
Renault Clio Rally3	Entered under driver's name	(France) Tom Pellerey	(France) Hervé Faucher	5–6, 9, 12
Renault Clio Rally3	Entered under driver's name	(Greece) Efthimios Halkias	(Greece) Nikos Komnos	7
Renault Clio Rally3	Entered under driver's name	(Greece) Giorgos Dodos	(Greece) Nikos Intzoglou	7
Renault Clio Rally3	Entered under driver's name	(Estonia) Joosep Ralf Nõgene	(Estonia) Aleks Lesk	9
Renault Clio Rally3	Entered under driver's name	(Finland) Ville Pynnönen	(Finland) Niklas Heino	9
Renault Clio Rally3	Entered under driver's name	(Germany) Timo Weigert	(Germany) Jasmin Weigert	9

== Results and standings ==
=== Season summary ===
Round	Event	Winning driver	Winning co-driver	Winning entrant	Winning time	Report	Ref.
1	(Monaco) Rallye Automobile Monte Carlo	(France) Arthur Pelamourges	(France) Bastien Pouget	(France) Arthur Pelamourges	3:44:44.9	Report	
2	Rally Sweden	(Australia) Taylor Gill	(Australia) Daniel Brkic	FIA Rally Star	2:51:17.7	Report	
3	Safari Rally Kenya	(Kenya) Nikhil Sachania	(Kenya) Deep Patel	(Kenya) Nikhil Sachania	7:04:36.9	Report	
4	(Spain) Rally Islas Canarias	(France) Mattéo Chatillon	(France) Maxence Cornuau	(France) Mattéo Chatillon	3:14:39.9	Report	
5	Rally de Portugal	(Australia) Taylor Gill	(Australia) Daniel Brkic	FIA Rally Star	4:15:07.3	Report	
6	(Italy) Rally Italia Sardegna	(Italy) Matteo Fontana	(Italy) Alessandro Arnaboldi	(Italy) Matteo Fontana	4:03:55.4	Report	
7	Acropolis Rally Greece	(Turkey) Ali Türkkan	(Turkey) Oytun Albayrak	(Turkey) Castrol Ford Team Türkiye	4:39:31.7	Report	
8	Rally Estonia	(Japan) Takumi Matsushita	(Finland) Ville Mannisenmäki	(Japan) Toyota Gazoo Racing WRT NG	3:00:39.2	Report	
9	Rally Finland	(Australia) Taylor Gill	(Australia) Daniel Brkic	FIA Rally Star	2:41:29.9	Report	
10	Rally del Paraguay	(Italy) Matteo Fontana	(Italy) Alessandro Arnaboldi	(Italy) Matteo Fontana	3:25:35.7	Report	
11	Rally Chile	(Italy) Matteo Fontana	(Italy) Alessandro Arnaboldi	(Italy) Matteo Fontana	3:21:07.2	Report	
12	(Europe) Central European Rally	(Australia) Taylor Gill	(Australia) Daniel Brkic	FIA Rally Star	2:54:29.4	Report	
13	Rally Japan	(France) Ghjuvanni Rossi	(France) Kylian Sarmezan	(France) Ghjuvanni Rossi	3:51:56.6	Report	
14	Rally Saudi Arabia	(Italy) Matteo Fontana	(Italy) Alessandro Arnaboldi	(Italy) Matteo Fontana	3:50:14.8	Report	

=== Scoring system ===
Position	1st	2nd	3rd	4th	5th	6th	7th	8th	9th	10th
Points	25	17	15	12	10	8	6	4	2	1

=== FIA WRC3 Championship for Drivers ===
Pos.	Driver	MON (Monaco)	SWE (Sweden)	KEN (Kenya)	ESP (Spain)	POR (Portugal)	ITA (Italy)	GRE (Greece)	EST (Estonia)	FIN (Finland)	PAR (Paraguay)	CHL (Chile)	EUR (Europe)	JPN (Japan)	SAU (Saudi Arabia)	Points
1	(Italy) Matteo Fontana	2	2				1				1	1		2	1	134
2	(Australia) Taylor Gill		1			1		2		1			1			117
3	(France) Ghjuvanni Rossi	3			3	7					2	Ret		1		77
4	(Turkey) Kerem Kazaz		5			2	5	4	Ret	7			2			72
5	(France) Arthur Pelamourges	1			2	11			5	6						60
6	(Bolivia) Nataniel Bruun				8	4	2		Ret		5	2				60
7	(Turkey) Ali Türkkan		3			9		1		2			Ret			59
8	(Japan) Takumi Matsushita		4		4	6			1	Ret						57
9	(Paraguay) Diego Domínguez Jr.	4	13			8		3		8			3			50
10	(Peru) André Martinez		14			17	3		3		6	6				46
11	(Greece) Georgios Vasilakis		12					10			4	9		4	5	37
12	(Peru) Eduardo Castro										3	3				30
13	(France) Mattéo Chatillon	Ret	8		1	Ret	Ret			16						29
14	(Kenya) Nikhil Sachania			1												25
15	(South Africa) Max Smart		12			3		6		10			Ret			24
16	(France) Eric Royère	6	11											3		23
17	(Japan) Shotaro Goto	Ret			5	WD			4	11						22
18	(Germany) Claire Schönborn		7			13		8		12			4			22
19	(Poland) Grzegorz Bonder								2	15						17
20	(India) Naveen Puligilla			Ret											2	17
21	(Finland) Ville Vatanen		15							3						15
22	(Saudi Arabia) Saeed Al-Mouri														3	15
23	(Germany) Timo Weigert						4			14						12
24	(Finland) Aatu Hakalehto									4						12
25	(Uruguay) Ignacio Gardiol											4				12
26	(Turkey) Burcu Çetinkaya														4	12
27	(Estonia) Joosep Ralf Nõgene		16			5				Ret						10
28	(Finland) Leevi Lassila		Ret							5						10
29	(France) Yanis Desangles	5														10
30	(Greece) Efthimios Halkias							5								10
31	(Chile) Felipe Padilla											5				10
32	(Sweden) Adam Grahn		6													8
33	(Poland) Igor Widłak				6											8
34	(Croatia) Slaven Šekuljica	7					Ret									6
35	(Spain) Jonás Pérez				7											6
36	(Greece) Giorgos Delaportas							7								6
37	(Chile) Carlos Prieto											7				6
38	(Chile) Eduardo Kovacs Bauer											8				4
39	(Belgium) Lyssia Baudet		9													2
40	(Greece) Giorgos Dodos							9								2
41	(Finland) Ville Pynnönen									9						2
42	(France) Tristan Charpentier		10			12										1
43	(France) Tom Pellerey					10				13			Ret			1
Pos.	Driver	MON (Monaco)	SWE (Sweden)	KEN (Kenya)	ESP (Spain)	POR (Portugal)	ITA (Italy)	GRE (Greece)	EST (Estonia)	FIN (Finland)	PAR (Paraguay)	CHL (Chile)	EUR (Europe)	JPN (Japan)	SAU (Saudi Arabia)	Points

Key
Colour	Result
Gold	Winner
Silver	2nd place
Bronze	3rd place
Green	Points finish
Blue	Non-points finish
Blue	Non-classified finish (NC)
Purple	Did not finish (Ret)
Black	Excluded (EX)
Black	Disqualified (DSQ)
White	Did not start (DNS)
White	Cancelled (C)
Blank	Withdrew entry from the event (WD)

=== FIA WRC3 Championship for Co-drivers ===
Pos.	Co-driver	MON (Monaco)	SWE (Sweden)	KEN (Kenya)	ESP (Spain)	POR (Portugal)	ITA (Italy)	GRE (Greece)	EST (Estonia)	FIN (Finland)	PAR (Paraguay)	CHL (Chile)	EUR (Europe)	JPN (Japan)	SAU (Saudi Arabia)	Points
1	(Italy) Alessandro Arnaboldi	2	2				1				1	1		2	1	134
2	(Australia) Daniel Brkic		1			1		2		1			1			117
3	(France) Kylian Sarmezan	3			3	7					2	Ret		1		78
4	(France) Corentin Silvestre		5			2	5	4	Ret	7			2			72
5	(France) Bastien Pouget	1			2	11			5	6						60
6	(Argentina) Pablo Olmos				8	4	2		Ret		5	2				60
7	(Turkey) Oytun Albaykar		3			9		1		2			Ret			59
8	(Spain) Rogelio Peñate	4	13			8		3		8			3			50
9	(Argentina) Matias Aranguren		14			17	3		3		6	6				46
10	(United Kingdom) Allan Harryman		12					10			4	9		4	5	37
11	(Finland) Pekka Kelander		4		4	6				Ret						32
12	(Peru) Julio Echazú										3	3				30
13	(France) Maxence Cornuau	Ret	8		1	Ret	Ret			16						29
14	(Kenya) Deep Patel			1												25
15	(Finland) Ville Mannisenmäki								1							25
16	(New Zealand) Malcolm Read					3		6		10			Ret			24
17	(France) Alexis Grenier	6	11											3		23
18	(India) Musa Sherif			Ret											2	17
19	(Poland) Łukasz Jastrzębski								2							17
20	(Germany) Michael Wenzel							8		12			4			16
21	(Finland) Jarno Ottman		15							3						15
22	(Saudi Arabia) Saeed Al-Mouri														3	15
23	(Germany) Jasmine Weigert						4									12
24	(Finland) Joonas Ojala									4						12
25	(Argentina) Ignacio Uez Ahumada											4				12
26	(Italy) Fabrizia Pons														4	12
27	(Finland) Jussi Lindberg	Ret			5	WD				11						10
28	(Estonia) Aleks Lesk		16			5				Ret						10
29	(Finland) Antti Linnaketo		Ret							5						10
30	(France) Nicolas Théron	5														10
31	(Greece) Nikos Komnos							5								10
32	(Chile) Sebastián Olguín											5				10
33	(Sweden) Maja Bengtsson		6													8
34	(Poland) Michał Marczewski				6											8
35	(Germany) Jara Hain		7			13										6
36	(Croatia) Damir Petrović	7					Ret									6
37	(Spain) Damián Sacramento				7											6
38	(Greece) Evangelos Panaritis							7								6
39	(Argentina) Juan Cruz Varela											7				6
40	(Argentina) Alberto Alvarez											8				4
41	(France) Léa Sam-Caw-Freve		9													2
42	(Greece) Nikos Intzoglou							9								2
43	(Finland) Niklas Heino									9						2
44	(France) Florian Barral		10			12										1
45	(France) Hervé Faucher					10				13			Ret			1
Pos.	Co-driver	MON (Monaco)	SWE (Sweden)	KEN (Kenya)	ESP (Spain)	POR (Portugal)	ITA (Italy)	GRE (Greece)	EST (Estonia)	FIN (Finland)	PAR (Paraguay)	CHL (Chile)	EUR (Europe)	JPN (Japan)	SAU (Saudi Arabia)	Points

Key
Colour	Result
Gold	Winner
Silver	2nd place
Bronze	3rd place
Green	Points finish
Blue	Non-points finish
Blue	Non-classified finish (NC)
Purple	Did not finish (Ret)
Black	Excluded (EX)
Black	Disqualified (DSQ)
White	Did not start (DNS)
White	Cancelled (C)
Blank	Withdrew entry from the event (WD)
