= Diego Domínguez Jr. =

Paraguayan rally driver (born 2000)

Personal information
- Nationality: (Paraguay) Paraguayan
- Born: 17 April 2000 (age 26)

World Rally Championship record
- Years active: 2019, 2022–present
- Co-driver: (Spain) Rogelio Peñate
- Teams: Teo Martín Motorsport
- Rallies: 38
- Rally wins: 0
- Podiums: 0
- Stage wins: 0
- Total points: 2
- First rally: 2019 Wales Rally GB

Diego Hugo Domínguez Bejarano (born 17 April 2000), also known as Diego Domínguez Jr., is a Paraguayan rally driver. He won the 2024 WRC3 Championship with Rogelio Peñate as his co-driver. He is the son of Diego Domínguez.

== Career ==
In the 2023 season, Domínguez won Rally Mexico, Safari Rally and Acropolis Rally in the WRC3. At Rally Chile, he retired from the round after he suffered a technical fault, which meant the driver's championship of the WRC3 was won by Roope Korhonen.

In the 2024 season, Domínguez was leading the WRC3 before the Rally Chile. In the race, the other participants in the WRC3 suffered from technical problems and Domínguez was able to drive in a strong lead position and secured the WRC3 driver's championship by driving to victory.

Domínguez entered a triple campaign in 2025, driving a Ford Fiesta Rally3 in the Junior WRC and WRC3, as well as a Toyota GR Yaris Rally2 in the WRC2.

== Rally results ==
=== Complete World Rally Championship results ===
Year	Entrant	Car	1	2	3	4	5	6	7	8	9	10	11	12	13	14	Pos.	Points
2019	Diego Domínguez Jr.	Ford Fiesta R2T	MON	SWE	MEX	FRA	ARG	CHL	POR	ITA	FIN	GER	TUR	GBR; 31	ESP; Ret	AUS; C	NC	0
2022	Diego Domínguez Jr.	Ford Fiesta Rally3	MON	SWE	CRO	POR	ITA; Ret	KEN; Ret	EST	FIN	BEL	GRE; 26	NZL	ESP; 37	JPN		NC	0
2023	Diego Domínguez Jr.	Ford Fiesta Rally3	MON	SWE; 25	MEX; 15	CRO; 38	POR	ITA; 20	KEN; 14	EST; 23	FIN	GRE; 18	CHL; Ret	EUR	JPN		NC	0
2024	Diego Domínguez Jr.	Ford Fiesta Rally3	MON	SWE; Ret		CRO; 52	POR; 18	ITA; 20	POL; 23	LAT	FIN; 29	GRE; 38	CHI; 19	EUR	JPN; 15		NC	0
2024	Diego Domínguez Jr.	Citroën C3 Rally2			KEN; Ret												NC	0
2025	Diego Domínguez Jr.	Toyota GR Yaris Rally2	MON; 30	SWE; 47	KEN; Ret	ESP; 19	POR; 48	ITA; 21	GRE; 22	EST	FIN; 36	PAR; 30	CHL; Ret	EUR; 15	JPN; 13	SAU; 16	NC	0
2026	Diego Domínguez Jr.	Toyota GR Yaris Rally2	MON	SWE	KEN; 9	CRO	ESP; 21	POR	JPN; Ret	GRE; 13	EST	FIN	PAR; 7	CHL; 13	ITA	SAU; C	20th	8

* Season still in progress.

=== WRC2 Results ===
Year	Entrant	Car	1	2	3	4	5	6	7	8	9	10	11	12	13	14	Pos.	Points
2024	Diego Dominguez Jr.	Citroën C3 Rally2	MON	SWE	KEN; Ret	CRO	POR	ITA	POL	LAT	FIN	GRE	CHL	EUR	JPN		NC	0
2025	Diego Domínguez Jr.	Toyota GR Yaris Rally2	MON	SWE	KEN; Ret	ESP; 9	POR	ITA; 10	GRE	EST	FIN	PAR; 17	CHL	EUR	JPN; 6	SAU; 4	18th	23
2026	Diego Domínguez Jr.	Toyota GR Yaris Rally2	MON	SWE	KEN; 5	CRO	ESP; 12	POR	JPN; Ret	GRE; 5	EST	FIN	PAR; 1	CHL; 6	ITA	SAU; C	9th	53

* Season still in progress.

=== WRC3 Results ===
Year	Entrant	Car	1	2	3	4	5	6	7	8	9	10	11	12	13	14	Pos.	Points
2022	Diego Domínguez Jr.	Ford Fiesta Rally3	MON	SWE	CRO	POR	ITA; Ret	KEN; Ret	EST	FIN	BEL	GRE; 1	NZL	ESP; 3	JPN		8th	40
2023	Diego Domínguez Jr.	Ford Fiesta Rally3	MON	SWE; 4	MEX; 1	CRO	POR	ITA	KEN; 1	EST	FIN	GRE; 1	CHL; Ret	EUR	JPN		2nd	87
2024	Diego Domínguez Jr.	Ford Fiesta Rally3	MON	SWE; Ret	KEN	CRO; 13	POR; 1	ITA; 1	POL; 1	LAT	FIN	GRE	CHI; 1	EUR	JPN; 1		1st	125
2025	Diego Domínguez Jr.	Ford Fiesta Rally3	MON; 4	SWE; 13	KEN	ESP	POR; 8	ITA	GRE; 3	EST	FIN; 8	PAR	CHL	EUR; 3	JPN	SAU	9th	50

=== JWRC Results ===
Year	Entrant	Car	1	2	3	4	5	Pos.	Points
2023	Diego Domínguez Jr.	Ford Fiesta Rally3	SWE; 3	CRO; 4	ITA; 2	EST; 3	GRE; 1	2nd	118
2024	Diego Domínguez Jr.	Ford Fiesta Rally3	SWE; Ret	CRO; 9	ITA; 1	FIN; 7	GRE; 9	6th	46
2025	Diego Domínguez Jr.	Ford Fiesta Rally3	SWE; 10	POR; 8	GRE; 3	FIN; 7	EUR; 4	6th	52
