= Toyota GR Yaris Rally2 =

Toyota Rally2 rally car

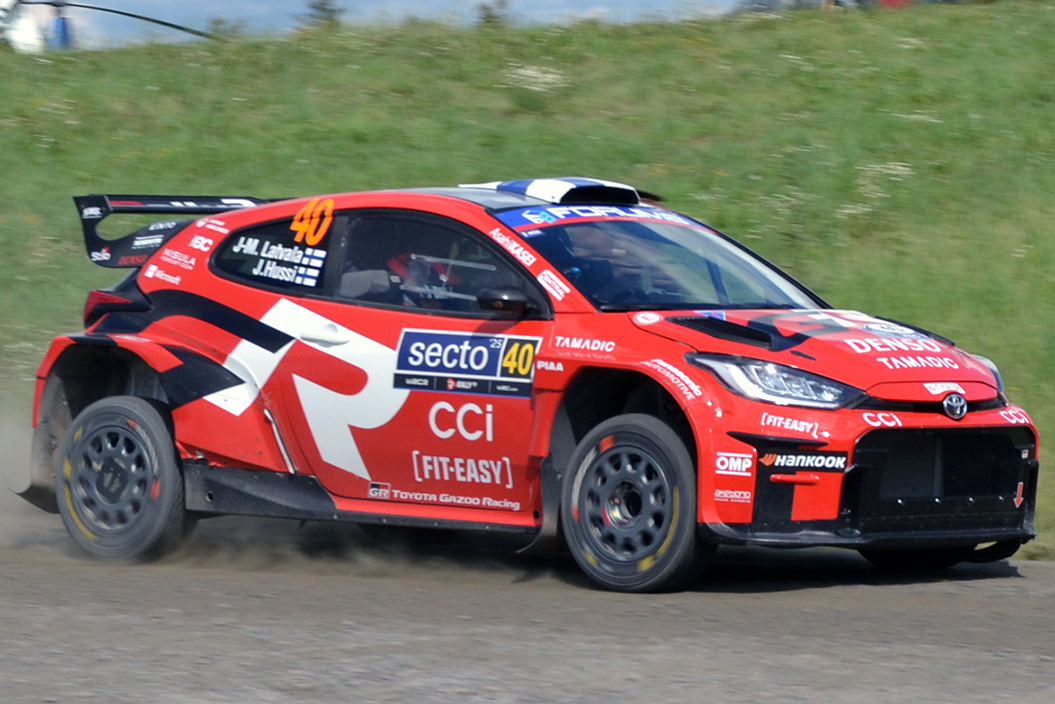
- The No. 40 GR Yaris Rally2 of Jari-Matti Latvala at the 2025 Rally Finland.
- Category: Rally2
- Constructor: Toyota
- Designers: Tom Fowler (Technical Director, Toyota Gazoo Racing WRT)
- Predecessor: Toyota Etios R5

Technical specifications
- Suspension (front): MacPherson strut
- Suspension (rear): MacPherson strut
- Length: 3,995 mm (157.3 in)
- Width: 1,820 mm (71.7 in)
- Height: 1,345 mm (53.0 in)
- Wheelbase: 2,556 mm (100.6 in)
- Engine: G16E-GTS 1.6 L (98 cu in) 3-cylinder turbocharged, Front-mounted
- Transmission: Sadev 5-speed sequential 4-wheel drive
- Power: 300 hp (224 kW; 304 PS)
- Weight: 1,230 kg (2,711.7 lb)
- Lubricants: ExxonMobil
- Tyres: Pirelli (2024); Hankook (2025-Present)

Competition history
- Notable drivers: (Finland) Sami Pajari (Finland) Jari-Matti Latvala (Finland) Roope Korhonen (Finland) Tuukka Kauppinen (Finland) Teemu Suninen (Sweden) Oliver Solberg (Spain) Jan Solans (Spain) Alejandro Cachón (Norway) Eyvind Brynildsen (Estonia) Georg Linnamäe (Japan) Yuki Yamamoto (Japan) Hikaru Kogure (Australia) Taylor Gill (Poland) Kajetan Kajetanowicz (Paraguay) Diego Domínguez Jr. (United Kingdom) Gus Greensmith (United Kingdom) Chris Ingram (United Kingdom) Kris Meeke
- Debut: (Monaco) 2024 Monte Carlo Rally
- First win: 2024 Rally de Portugal
- Last win: 2026 Rally del Paraguay
Wins
15 (WRC2)
4 (ERC)

The Toyota GR Yaris Rally2 is a Rally2 car built by Toyota Gazoo Racing WRT based on the GR Yaris production car. The car made its first public appearance at the 2022 Rally Japan, with Juha Kankkunen as the driver. The car debuted at the 2024 Monte Carlo Rally in WRC2.

== Rally victories ==
=== WRC2 ===
| Year | No. | Event | Surface | Driver | Co-driver |
|---|---|---|---|---|---|
| 2024 | 1 | 2024 Rally de Portugal | Gravel | (Spain) Jan Solans | (Spain) Rodrigo Sanjuan |
| 2024 | 2 | (Italy) 2024 Rally Italia Sardegna | Gravel | (Finland) Sami Pajari | (Finland) Enni Mälkönen |
| 2024 | 3 | 2024 Rally Poland | Gravel | (Finland) Sami Pajari | (Finland) Enni Mälkönen |
| 2024 | 4 | (Greece) 2024 Acropolis Rally | Gravel | (Finland) Sami Pajari | (Finland) Enni Mälkönen |
| 2025 | 5 | 2025 Rally Sweden | Snow | (Sweden) Oliver Solberg | (United Kingdom) Elliott Edmondson |
| 2025 | 6 | 2025 Rally de Portugal | Gravel | (Sweden) Oliver Solberg | (United Kingdom) Elliott Edmondson |
| 2025 | 7 | (Greece) 2025 Acropolis Rally | Gravel | (Sweden) Oliver Solberg | (United Kingdom) Elliott Edmondson |
| 2025 | 8 | 2025 Rally Finland | Gravel | (Finland) Roope Korhonen | (Finland) Anssi Viinikka |
| 2025 | 9 | 2025 Rally del Paraguay | Gravel | (Sweden) Oliver Solberg | (United Kingdom) Elliott Edmondson |
| 2025 | 10 | 2025 Rally Chile | Gravel | (Sweden) Oliver Solberg | (United Kingdom) Elliott Edmondson |
| 2025 | 11 | 2025 Rally Japan | Tarmac | (Spain) Alejandro Cachón | (Spain) Borja Rozada |
| 2026 | 12 | 2026 Rally Sweden | Snow | (Finland) Roope Korhonen | (Finland) Anssi Viinikka |
| 2026 | 13 | 2026 Rally de Portugal | Gravel | (Finland) Teemu Suninen | (Finland) Janni Hussi |
| 2026 | 14 | 2026 Rally del Paraguay | Gravel | (Paraguay) Diego Domínguez Jr. | (Spain) Rogelio Peñate |
| 2026 | 15 | (Italy) 2026 Rally Italia Sardegna | Gravel | (Finland) Roope Korhonen | (Finland) Anssi Viinikka |

=== European Rally Championship ===
| Year | No. | Event | Surface | Driver | Co-driver |
|---|---|---|---|---|---|
| 2024 | 1 | 2024 Rally Estonia | Gravel | (Estonia) Georg Linnamäe | (United Kingdom) James Morgan |
| 2025 | 2 | 2025 Rally Hungary | Gravel | (Finland) Roope Korhonen | (Finland) Anssi Viinikka |
| 2025 | 3 | (Sweden) 2025 Royal Rally of Scandinavia | Gravel | (Norway) Eyvind Brynildsen | (Norway) Jørn Listerud |
| 2026 | 4 | (United Kingdom) 2026 Rali Ceredigion | Tarmac | (United Kingdom) Kris Meeke | (Republic of Ireland) Noel O'Sullivan Jr. |
