= Naveen Puligilla =

Indian rally driver

Naveen Puligilla is an Indian rally driver from Hyderabad. He competes in the WRC3 class of the World Rally Championship and in the Indian National Rally Championship. He became the first Indian driver to win a podium in a WRC class at Saudi Arabia in November 2025. Along with Musa Sherif, the duo also became the first Indian pair of driver and co-driver, to win a class podium in WRC.

== Career ==
Puligilla started as an off-roader who won the Hampi Utsav three times. Later, he entered for a full season in the Indian National Rally Championship (INRC) in 2024. And he won the National championship in the INRC 3T class in 2025.

Puligilla made his international debut in the Asia Pacific Rally Championship (APRC) at the New Zealand round 2024. In March 2025, he made his debut at the World Rally Championship round, in the WRC3 class, at the 2025 Safari Rally, Kenya, along with co-driver Musa Sherif.

In November 2025, Puligilla claimed a second place in the WRC3 class, along with co-driver Sherif in the 2025 Rally Saudi Arabia at Jeddah. The Indian duo representing Duran Racing team, then claimed a third place, also in the WRC3 class at 2026 Safari Rally, Kenya in March 2026. The duo scored another podium in their third consecutive WRC round, a WRC3 third place at 2026 Rally del Paraguay in August 2026.

In July 2026, Puligilla, along with Sherif, won the ARC3 class, while finishing fourth overall in the 2026 Rwanda Mountain Gorilla Rally, the third round of the FIA African Rally Championship (ARC) at Kigali City, Rwanda.
