= Shane Byrne (co-driver) =

Irish rally co-driver (born 1992)

Personal information
- Nationality: (Republic of Ireland) Irish
- Born: 29 December 1992 (age 33); Donegal, Ireland

World Rally Championship record
- Years active: 2026–present
- Driver: (Republic of Ireland) Jon Armstrong
- Teams: M-Sport Ford WRT
- Rallies: 11
- Championships: 0
- Rally wins: 0
- Podiums: 0
- Stage wins: 1
- Total points: 16
- First rally: 2026 Monte Carlo Rally
- Last rally: 2026 Rally del Paraguay

Shane Byrne (born 29 December 1992) is an Irish rally co-driver who currently competes in the World Rally Championship for M-Sport Ford WRT alongside Jon Armstrong.

== Biography ==
Byrne was born in Bruckless in the county of Donegal. He became the co-driver of Jon Armstrong in 2025, competing in the European Rally Championship. They would step up to contest the 2026 World Rally Championship for M-Sport Ford WRT, marking Byrne's debut in the championship.

== Rally results ==
=== WRC results ===
Year	Entrant	Car	1	2	3	4	5	6	7	8	9	10	11	12	13	14	WDC	Points
2026	M-Sport Ford WRT	Ford Puma Rally1	MON; Ret	SWE; 8	KEN; 15	CRO; 32	ESP; 11	POR; Ret	JPN	GRE	EST	FIN	PAR	CHL	ITA	SAU	14th	10

- Season still in progress.
