= 2026 Monte Carlo Rally =

94th edition of the Monte Carlo Rally

2026 Monte Carlo Rally 94^{e} Rallye Automobile Monte-Carlo
Round 1 of 13 in the 2026 World Rally Championship
Next event →
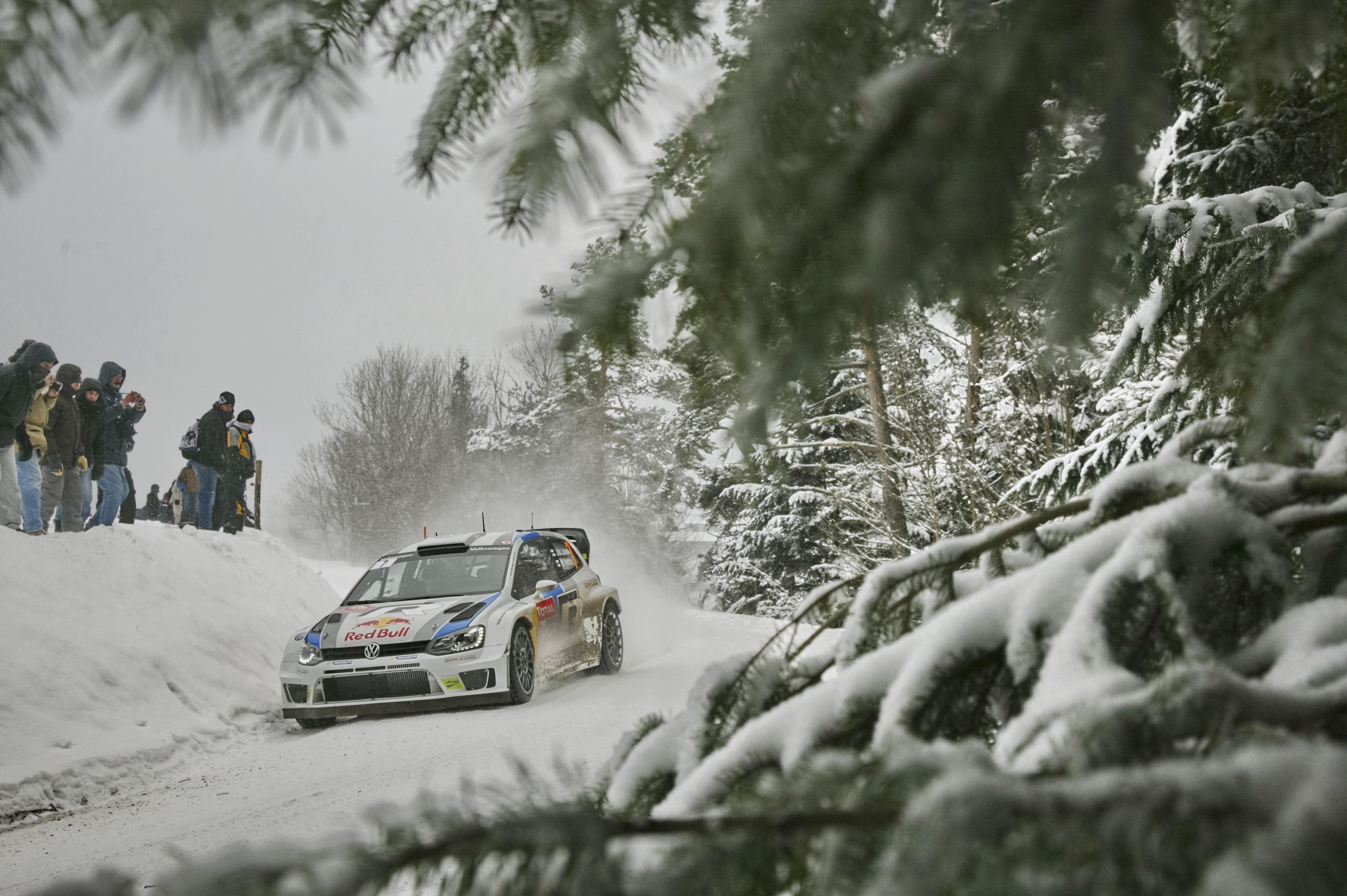
- The Monte Carlo Rally is run on a mixture of tarmac and snow stages.
- Host country: Monaco (Note: Although the rally was run in France, the Fédération Internationale de l'Automobile does not consider France to be the host nation.)
- Rally base: Gap, Provence-Alpes-Côte d'Azur, France
- Dates run: 22 – 25 January 2026
- Start location: Monaco, Monte Carlo
- Finish location: Moulinet, Alpes-Maritimes, France
- Stages: 17 (339.15 km; 210.74 miles)
- Stage surface: Tarmac and snow
- Transport distance: 1,214.07 km (754.39 miles)
- Overall distance: 1,553.22 km (965.13 miles)

Statistics
- Crews registered: 66
- Crews: 65 at start, 48 at finish

Overall results
- Overall winner: (Sweden) Oliver Solberg (United Kingdom) Elliott Edmondson (Japan) Toyota Gazoo Racing WRT; 4:24:59.0
- Sunday Accumulated leader: (France) Yohan Rossel (France) Arnaud Dunand (Italy) Lancia Corse HF; 1:07:55.0
- Power Stage winner: (United Kingdom) Elfyn Evans (United Kingdom) Scott Martin (Japan) Toyota Gazoo Racing WRT; 20:06.7

Support category results
- WRC-2 winner: (France) Léo Rossel (France) Guillaume Mercoiret (France) 2C Junior Team; 4:37:57.4
- WRC-3 winner: (France) Eric Royère (France) Alexis Grenier; 5:36:47.5

The 2026 Monte Carlo Rally (also known as the 94^{e} Rallye Automobile Monte-Carlo) was a motor racing event for rally cars held over four days from 22 to 25 January 2026. It marked the ninety-fourth running of the Monte Carlo Rally, and was the opening round of the 2026 World Rally Championship, 2026 WRC2 Championship and 2026 WRC3 Championship. The 2026 event was based in Gap, Provence-Alpes-Côte d'Azur in France and was consisted of seventeen special stages, covering a total competitive distance of 339.15 km (210.74 mi).

Sébastien Ogier and Vincent Landais were the defending rally winners, and Toyota Gazoo Racing WRT were the manufacturer's winners. Yohan Rossel and Arnaud Dunand were the defending rally winners in the WRC2 championship. Arthur Pelamourges and Bastien Pouget were the defending rally winners in the WRC3 championship.

Oliver Solberg and Elliott Edmondson won the rally, and Toyota successfully defended their titles. Léo Rossel and Guillaume Mercoiret were the winners in the WRC2 category. Eric Royère and Alexis Grenier were the winners in the WRC3 category.

== Background ==
=== Entry list ===
The following crews entered into the rally. The event was open to crews competing in the World Rally Championship, its support categories, the WRC2 Championship, the WRC3 Championship and privateer entries that were not registered to score points in any championship. Eleven crews entered under Rally1 regulations, as were twenty-five Rally2 crews in the WRC2 Championship and five Rally3 crews in the WRC3 Championship.

Rally1 entries competing in the World Rally Championship
| No. | Driver | Co-Driver | Entrant | Car | Championship eligibility | Tyre |
|---|---|---|---|---|---|---|
| 1 | (France) Sébastien Ogier | (France) Vincent Landais | (Japan) Toyota Gazoo Racing WRT | Toyota GR Yaris Rally1 | Driver, Co-driver, Manufacturer | H |
| 5 | (Finland) Sami Pajari | (Finland) Marko Salminen | (Japan) Toyota Gazoo Racing WRT2 | Toyota GR Yaris Rally1 | Driver, Co-driver, Manufacturer, Team | H |
| 11 | (Belgium) Thierry Neuville | (Belgium) Martijn Wydaeghe | (South Korea) Hyundai Shell Mobis WRT | Hyundai i20 N Rally1 | Driver, Co-driver, Manufacturer | H |
| 13 | (Luxembourg) Grégoire Munster | (Belgium) Louis Louka | (United Kingdom) M-Sport Ford WRT | Ford Puma Rally1 | Driver, Co-driver | H |
| 16 | (France) Adrien Fourmaux | (France) Alexandre Coria | (South Korea) Hyundai Shell Mobis WRT | Hyundai i20 N Rally1 | Driver, Co-driver, Manufacturer | H |
| 18 | (Japan) Takamoto Katsuta | (Republic of Ireland) Aaron Johnston | (Japan) Toyota Gazoo Racing WRT | Toyota GR Yaris Rally1 | Driver, Co-driver | H |
| 20 | (New Zealand) Hayden Paddon | (New Zealand) John Kennard | (South Korea) Hyundai Shell Mobis WRT | Hyundai i20 N Rally1 | Driver, Co-driver, Manufacturer | H |
| 33 | (United Kingdom) Elfyn Evans | (United Kingdom) Scott Martin | (Japan) Toyota Gazoo Racing WRT | Toyota GR Yaris Rally1 | Driver, Co-driver, Manufacturer | H |
| 55 | (Republic of Ireland) Josh McErlean | (Republic of Ireland) Eoin Treacy | (United Kingdom) M-Sport Ford WRT | Ford Puma Rally1 | Driver, Co-driver, Manufacturer | H |
| 95 | (Republic of Ireland) Jon Armstrong | (Republic of Ireland) Shane Byrne | (United Kingdom) M-Sport Ford WRT | Ford Puma Rally1 | Driver, Co-driver, Manufacturer | H |
| 99 | (Sweden) Oliver Solberg | (United Kingdom) Elliott Edmondson | (Japan) Toyota Gazoo Racing WRT | Toyota GR Yaris Rally1 | Driver, Co-driver, Manufacturer | H |

Rally2 entries competing in the WRC2 Championship
| No. | Driver | Co-Driver | Entrant | Car | Championship eligibility | Tyre |
|---|---|---|---|---|---|---|
| 21 | (France) Yohan Rossel | (France) Arnaud Dunand | (Italy) Lancia Corse HF | Lancia Ypsilon Rally2 HF Integrale | Driver, Co-driver, Team | H |
| 22 | (Bulgaria) Nikolay Gryazin | (Kyrgyzstan) Konstantin Aleksandrov | (Italy) Lancia Corse HF | Lancia Ypsilon Rally2 HF Integrale | Challenger Driver, Challenger Co-driver, Team | H |
| 23 | (Italy) Roberto Daprà | (Italy) Luca Guglielmetti | (Italy) Roberto Daprà | Škoda Fabia RS Rally2 | Challenger Driver, Challenger Co-driver | H |
| 26 | (France) Eric Camilli | (France) Thibault de la Haye | (France) Eric Camilli | Škoda Fabia RS Rally2 | Driver, Co-driver | H |
| 27 | (Czech Republic) Filip Mareš | (Czech Republic) Radovan Bucha | (Czech Republic) Filip Mareš | Toyota GR Yaris Rally2 | Challenger Driver, Challenger Co-driver | H |
| 28 | (France) Léo Rossel | (France) Guillaume Mercoiret | (France) 2C Junior Team | Citroën C3 Rally2 | Challenger Driver, Challenger Co-driver | H |
| 29 | (France) Pablo Sarrazin | (France) Yannick Roche | (France) Pablo Sarrazin | Citroën C3 Rally2 | Challenger Driver, Challenger Co-driver | H |
| 30 | (Czech Republic) Filip Kohn | (United Kingdom) Ross Whittock | (Czech Republic) Filip Kohn | Škoda Fabia RS Rally2 | Challenger Driver, Challenger Co-driver | H |
| 31 | (United Kingdom) Chris Ingram | (United States) Alexander Kihurani | (United Kingdom) Chris Ingram | Toyota GR Yaris Rally2 | Challenger Driver, Challenger Co-driver | H |
| 32 | (France) Mattéo Chatillon | (France) Maxence Cornuau | (France) Mattéo Chatillon | Škoda Fabia RS Rally2 | Challenger Driver, Challenger Co-driver | H |
| 34 | (France) Eliott Delecour | (France) Sabrina De Castelli | (France) Eliott Delecour | Toyota GR Yaris Rally2 | Challenger Driver, Challenger Co-driver | H |
| 35 | (France) Arthur Pelamourges | (France) Bastien Pouget | (France) Arthur Pelamourges | Hyundai i20 N Rally2 | Challenger Driver, Challenger Co-driver | H |
| 36 | (Poland) Jarosław Kołtun | (Poland) Ireneusz Pleskot | (Poland) Jarosław Kołtun | Škoda Fabia RS Rally2 | Challenger Driver, Challenger Co-driver | H |
| 37 | (Belgium) Amaury Molle | (France) Alex Dubois | (Belgium) Amaury Molle | Škoda Fabia RS Rally2 | Challenger Driver, Challenger Co-driver | H |
| 38 | (Switzerland) Olivier Burri | (Switzerland) Stéphane Fellay | (Switzerland) Olivier Burri | Toyota GR Yaris Rally2 | Challenger Driver, Challenger Co-driver | H |
| 39 | (Belgium) John Wartique | (Belgium) Maxime Andernack | (Belgium) John Wartique | Škoda Fabia RS Rally2 | Challenger Driver, Challenger Co-driver | H |
| 40 | (France) Julien Piguet | (Lebanon) Marc Haddad | (France) Julien Piguet | Citroën C3 Rally2 | Challenger Driver, Challenger Co-driver | H |
| 41 | (Switzerland) Stefano Mella | (Switzerland) Veronica Tramontin | (Switzerland) Stefano Mella | Škoda Fabia RS Rally2 | Challenger Driver, Challenger Co-driver | H |
| 42 | (Austria) Johannes Keferböck | (Austria) Ilka Minor | (Austria) Johannes Keferböck | Toyota GR Yaris Rally2 | Challenger/Masters Driver, Challenger Co-driver | H |
| 43 | (Republic of Ireland) Eamonn Boland | (Republic of Ireland) Michael Joseph Morrissey | (Republic of Ireland) Eamonn Boland | Ford Fiesta Rally2 | Challenger/Masters Driver, Challenger/Masters Co-driver | H |
| 44 | (Italy) Luciano Cobbe | (Italy) Roberto Mometti | (Italy) Luciano Cobbe | Škoda Fabia RS Rally2 | Challenger/Masters Driver, Challenger/Masters Co-driver | H |
| 45 | (Greece) Dimitris Drivakos | (Greece) Ekaterini Bante | (Greece) Dimitris Drivakos | Hyundai i20 R5 | Challenger Driver, Challenger Co-driver | H |
| 46 | (United States) Filippo Marchino | (Italy) Pietro Elia Ometto | (United States) Filippo Marchino | Citroën C3 Rally2 | Challenger Driver, Challenger Co-driver | H |
| 47 | (Netherlands) Henk Vossen | (Netherlands) Saskia Bleijenberg | (Netherlands) Henk Vossen | Hyundai i20 N Rally2 | Challenger Driver, Challenger Co-driver | H |
| 48 | (Italy) Carlo Covi | (Italy) Michela Lorigiola | (Italy) Carlo Covi | Škoda Fabia R5 | Challenger Driver, Challenger Co-driver | H |

Rally3 entries competing in the WRC3 Championship
| No. | Driver | Co-Driver | Entrant | Car | Tyre |
|---|---|---|---|---|---|
| 49 | (Italy) Matteo Fontana | (Italy) Alessandro Arnaboldi | (Italy) Matteo Fontana | Ford Fiesta Rally3 | H |
| 50 | (France) Ghjuvanni Rossi | (France) Kylian Sarmezan | (France) Ghjuvanni Rossi | Ford Fiesta Rally3 | H |
| 51 | (France) Eric Royère | (France) Alexis Grenier | (France) Eric Royère | Ford Fiesta Rally3 | H |
| 52 | (France) Jean-Christophe Guibert | (France) Laurent Gracial | (France) Jean-Christophe Guibert | Ford Fiesta Rally3 | H |
| 53 | (France) Olivier Courtois | (France) Hubert Risser | (France) Olivier Courtois | Renault Clio Rally3 | H |

Other major entries
| No. | Driver | Co-Driver | Entrant | Car | Tyre |
|---|---|---|---|---|---|
| 24 | (Estonia) Romet Jürgenson | (Estonia) Siim Oja | (United Kingdom) M-Sport Ford WRT | Ford Fiesta Rally2 | H |
| 25 | (Japan) Yuki Yamamoto | (Republic of Ireland) James Fulton | (Finland) Printsport | Toyota GR Yaris Rally2 | H |
| 56 | (Germany) Albert von Thurn und Taxis | (Germany) Jara Hain | (Germany) Albert von Thurn und Taxis | Škoda Fabia RS Rally2 | H |

=== Itinerary ===
All dates and times are CET (UTC+1).

| Date | No. | Time span | Stage name | Distance |
|---|---|---|---|---|
| 21 January | —N/a | After 14:01 | Gap [Shakedown] | 4.25 km |
| 22 January | | After 14:30 | Opening ceremony, Monaco | —N/a |
| 22 January | SS1 | After 16:05 | Toudon / Saint-Antonin | 21.90 km |
| 22 January | SS2 | After 18:35 | Esclangon / Seyne-les-Alpes | 23.80 km |
| 22 January | SS3 | After 20:35 | Vaumeilh / Claret 1 | 15.06 km |
| 22 January | | 21:39 – 22:27 | Flexi service A, Gap | —N/a |
| 23 January | | 7:28 – 7:46 | Service B, Gap | —N/a |
| 23 January | SS4 | After 9:04 | Laborel / Chauvac-Laux-Montaux 1 | 17.95 km |
| 23 January | SS5 | After 10:32 | Saint-Nazaire-le-Désert / La Motte-Chalancon 1 | 28.70 km |
| 23 January | SS6 | After 11:50 | La-Bâtie-des-Fontes / Aspremont 1 | 17.79 km |
| 23 January | | 12:55 – 13:25 | Regroup, Gap | —N/a |
| 23 January | | 13:25 – 13:58 | Service C, Gap | —N/a |
| 23 January | SS7 | After 15:16 | Laborel / Chauvac-Laux-Montaux 2 | 17.95 km |
| 23 January | SS8 | After 16:44 | Saint-Nazaire-le-Désert / La Motte-Chalancon 2 | 28.70 km |
| 23 January | SS9 | After 18:05 | La-Bâtie-des-Fontes / Aspremont 2 | 17.79 km |
| 23 January | | 19:20 – 20:08 | Flexi service D, Gap | —N/a |
| 24 January | | 7:30 – 7:48 | Service E, Gap | —N/a |
| 24 January | SS10 | After 8:31 | La Bréole / Bellaffaire 1 | 29.93 km |
| 24 January | SS11 | After 9:55 | Vaumeilh / Claret 2 | 15.06 km |
| 24 January | | 10:45 – 11:15 | Regroup, Gap | —N/a |
| 24 January | | 11:15 – 11:48 | Service F, Gap | —N/a |
| 24 January | SS12 | After 12:31 | La Bréole / Bellaffaire 2 | 29.93 km |
| 24 January | | 14:00 – 14:20 | Remote Service G, Château-Arnoux-Saint-Auban | —N/a |
| 24 January | | 17:40 – 18:25 | Regroup, Monaco | —N/a |
| 24 January | SS13 | After 18:35 | Monaco Circuit | 2.69 km |
| 25 January | | 6:22 – 6:42 | Remote Service H, Château-Arnoux-Saint-Auban | —N/a |
| 25 January | SS14 | After 8:05 | Col de Braus / La Cabanette 1 | 12.50 km |
| 25 January | SS15 | After 9:35 | La Bollène-Vésubie / Moulinet 1 | 23.45 km |
| 25 January | SS16 | After 11:09 | Col de Braus / La Cabanette 2 | 12.50 km |
| 25 January | SS17 | After 13:15 | La Bollène-Vésubie / Moulinet 2 [Power Stage] | 23.45 km |
| 25 January | | After 15:00 | Finish, Moulinet, Alpes-Maritimes | —N/a |
| 25 January | | After 17:00 | Podium ceremony, Monaco | —N/a |

== Report ==
=== WRC Rally1 ===
==== Classification ====
| Position | | No. | Driver | Co-driver | Entrant | Car | Time | Difference | Points | | | |
| Event | Class | No. | Driver | Co-driver | Entrant | Car | Time | Difference | Event | Sunday | Stage | Total |
|---|---|---|---|---|---|---|---|---|---|---|---|---|
| 1 | 1 | 99 | Oliver Solberg | Elliott Edmondson | Toyota Gazoo Racing WRT | Toyota GR Yaris Rally1 | 4:24:59.0 | 0.0 | 25 | 1 | 4 | 30 |
| 2 | 2 | 33 | Elfyn Evans | Scott Martin | Toyota Gazoo Racing WRT | Toyota GR Yaris Rally1 | 4:25:50.8 | +51.8 | 17 | 4 | 5 | 26 |
| 3 | 3 | 1 | Sébastien Ogier | Vincent Landais | Toyota Gazoo Racing WRT | Toyota GR Yaris Rally1 | 4:27:01.2 | +2:02.1 | 15 | 0 | 3 | 18 |
| 4 | 4 | 16 | Adrien Fourmaux | Alexandre Coria | Hyundai Shell Mobis WRT | Hyundai i20 N Rally1 | 4:30:58.3 | +5:59.3 | 12 | 3 | 2 | 17 |
| 5 | 5 | 11 | Thierry Neuville | Martijn Wydaeghe | Hyundai Shell Mobis WRT | Hyundai i20 N Rally1 | 4:35:28.8 | +10:29.7 | 10 | 0 | 0 | 10 |
| 7 | 6 | 18 | Takamoto Katsuta | Aaron Johnston | Toyota Gazoo Racing WRT | Toyota GR Yaris Rally1 | 4:38:04.4 | +13:05.3 | 6 | 0 | 0 | 6 |
| 11 | 7 | 20 | Hayden Paddon | John Kennard | Hyundai Shell Mobis WRT | Hyundai i20 N Rally1 | 4:43:46.5 | +18:47.5 | 0 | 0 | 0 | 0 |
| Retired SS17 | | 55 | Josh McErlean | Eoin Treacy | M-Sport Ford WRT | Ford Puma Rally1 | Accident damage | | 0 | 0 | 0 | 0 |
| Retired SS16 | | 95 | Jon Armstrong | Shane Byrne | M-Sport Ford WRT | Ford Puma Rally1 | Accident | | 0 | 0 | 0 | 0 |
| Retired SS14 | | 13 | Grégoire Munster | Louis Louka | M-Sport Ford WRT | Ford Puma Rally1 | Mechanical | | 0 | 0 | 0 | 0 |
| Retired SS12 | | 5 | Sami Pajari | Marko Salminen | Toyota Gazoo Racing WRT2 | Toyota GR Yaris Rally1 | Accident | | 0 | 0 | 0 | 0 |

==== Special stages ====
| Stage | Winners | Car | Time | Class leaders |
|---|---|---|---|---|
| SD | Katsuta / Johnston | Toyota GR Yaris Rally1 | 2:31.8 | —N/a |
| SS1 | Evans / Martin | Toyota GR Yaris Rally1 | 16:05.7 | Evans / Martin |
| SS2 | Solberg / Edmondson | Toyota GR Yaris Rally1 | 16:47.3 | Solberg / Edmondson |
| SS3 | Ogier / Landais | Toyota GR Yaris Rally1 | 10:04.7 | Solberg / Edmondson |
| SS4 | Solberg / Edmondson | Toyota GR Yaris Rally1 | 13:48.5 | Solberg / Edmondson |
| SS5 | Evans / Martin | Toyota GR Yaris Rally1 | 17:58.7 | Solberg / Edmondson |
| SS6 | Solberg / Edmondson | Toyota GR Yaris Rally1 | 12:57.1 | Solberg / Edmondson |
| SS7 | Solberg / Edmondson | Toyota GR Yaris Rally1 | 12:10.0 | Solberg / Edmondson |
| SS8 | Ogier / Landais | Toyota GR Yaris Rally1 | 18:05.1 | Solberg / Edmondson |
| SS9 | Ogier / Landais | Toyota GR Yaris Rally1 | 12:09.3 | Solberg / Edmondson |
| SS10 | Ogier / Landais | Toyota GR Yaris Rally1 | 27:27.8 | Solberg / Edmondson |
| SS11 | Solberg / Edmondson | Toyota GR Yaris Rally1 | 11:56.1 | Solberg / Edmondson |
| SS12 | Solberg / Edmondson | Toyota GR Yaris Rally1 | 23:06.4 | Solberg / Edmondson |
| SS13 | Fourmaux / Coria | Hyundai i20 N Rally1 | 2:19.3 | Solberg / Edmondson |
| SS14 | Fourmaux / Coria | Hyundai i20 N Rally1 | 13:55.3 | Solberg / Edmondson |
| SS15 | Evans / Martin | Toyota GR Yaris Rally1 | 23:17.5 | Solberg / Edmondson |
| SS16 | Fourmaux / Coria | Hyundai i20 N Rally1 | 10:36.2 | Solberg / Edmondson |
| SS17 | Evans / Martin | Toyota GR Yaris Rally1 | 20:06.7 | Solberg / Edmondson |

==== Championship standings ====
Drivers' Standings
| Move | Pos. | Driver | Points |
|---|---|---|---|
| New entry | 1 | Oliver Solberg | 30 |
| New entry | 2 | Elfyn Evans | 26 |
| New entry | 3 | Sébastien Ogier | 18 |
| New entry | 4 | Adrien Fourmaux | 17 |
| New entry | 5 | Thierry Neuville | 10 |

Co-drivers' Standings
| Move | Pos. | Driver | Points |
|---|---|---|---|
| New entry | 1 | Elliott Edmondson | 30 |
| New entry | 2 | Scott Martin | 26 |
| New entry | 3 | Vincent Landais | 18 |
| New entry | 4 | Alexandre Coria | 17 |
| New entry | 5 | Martijn Wydaeghe | 10 |

Manufacturers' Standings
| Move | Pos. | Driver | Points |
|---|---|---|---|
| New entry | 1 | Toyota Gazoo Racing WRT | 59 |
| New entry | 2 | Hyundai Shell Mobis WRT | 35 |

=== WRC2 Rally2 ===
==== Classification ====
| Position | | No. | Driver | Co-driver | Entrant | Car | Time | Difference | Points | |
| Event | Class | No. | Driver | Co-driver | Entrant | Car | Time | Difference | Class | Event |
|---|---|---|---|---|---|---|---|---|---|---|
| 6 | 1 | 28 | Léo Rossel | Guillaume Mercoiret | 2C Junior Team | Citroën C3 Rally2 | 4:37:57.4 | 0.0 | 25 | 8 |
| 8 | 2 | 23 | Roberto Daprà | Luca Guglielmetti | Roberto Daprà | Škoda Fabia RS Rally2 | 4:40:06.9 | +2:09.5 | 17 | 4 |
| 9 | 3 | 35 | Arthur Pelamourges | Bastien Pouget | Arthur Pelamourges | Hyundai i20 N Rally2 | 4:43:08.4 | +5:11.0 | 15 | 2 |
| 10 | 4 | 26 | Eric Camilli | Thibault de la Haye | Eric Camilli | Škoda Fabia RS Rally2 | 4:43:35.4 | +5:38.0 | 12 | 1 |
| 12 | 5 | 31 | Chris Ingram | Alexander Kihurani | Chris Ingram | Toyota GR Yaris Rally2 | 4:46:41.7 | +8:44.3 | 10 | 0 |
| 13 | 6 | 22 | Nikolay Gryazin | Konstantin Aleksandrov | Lancia Corse HF | Lancia Ypsilon Rally2 HF Integrale | 4:56:55.2 | +18:57.8 | 8 | 0 |
| 15 | 7 | 36 | Jarosław Kołtun | Ireneusz Pleskot | Jarosław Kołtun | Škoda Fabia RS Rally2 | 5:00:21.1 | +22:23.7 | 6 | 0 |
| 17 | 8 | 30 | Filip Kohn | Ross Whittock | Filip Kohn | Škoda Fabia RS Rally2 | 5:05:38.3 | +27:40.9 | 4 | 0 |
| 18 | 9 | 21 | Yohan Rossel | Arnaud Dunand | Lancia Corse HF | Lancia Ypsilon Rally2 HF Integrale | 5:07:41.1 | +29:43.7 | 2 | 6 |
| 19 | 10 | 39 | John Wartique | Maxime Andernack | John Wartique | Škoda Fabia RS Rally2 | 5:11:36.2 | +33:38.8 | 1 | 0 |
| 20 | 11 | 32 | Mattéo Chatillon | Maxence Cornuau | Mattéo Chatillon | Škoda Fabia RS Rally2 | 5:12:01.9 | +34:04.5 | 0 | 0 |
| 21 | 12 | 34 | Eliott Delecour | Sabrina De Castelli | Eliott Delecour | Toyota GR Yaris Rally2 | 5:12:06.5 | +34:09.1 | 0 | 0 |
| 22 | 13 | 37 | Amaury Molle | Alex Dubois | Amaury Molle | Škoda Fabia RS Rally2 | 5:16:20.5 | +38:23.1 | 0 | 0 |
| 23 | 14 | 42 | Johannes Keferböck | Ilka Minor | Johannes Keferböck | Toyota GR Yaris Rally2 | 5:18:03.1 | +40:05.7 | 0 | 0 |
| 27 | 15 | 38 | Olivier Burri | Stéphane Fellay | Olivier Burri | Toyota GR Yaris Rally2 | 5:33:32.1 | +55:34.7 | 0 | 0 |
| 29 | 16 | 46 | Filippo Marchino | Pietro Elia Ometto | Filippo Marchino | Citroën C3 Rally2 | 5:39:10.7 | +1:01:13.3 | 0 | 0 |
| 30 | 17 | 43 | Eamonn Boland | Michael Joseph Morrissey | Eamonn Boland | Ford Fiesta Rally2 | 5:39:38.6 | +1:01:41.2 | 0 | 0 |
| 37 | 18 | 41 | Stefano Mella | Veronica Tramontin | Stefano Mella | Škoda Fabia RS Rally2 | 6:05:58.0 | +1:28:00.6 | 0 | 0 |
| 40 | 19 | 45 | Dimitris Drivakos | Ekaterini Bante | Dimitris Drivakos | Hyundai i20 R5 | 6:13:40.1 | +1:35:42.7 | 0 | 0 |
| 41 | 20 | 40 | Julien Piguet | Marc Haddad | Julien Piguet | Citroën C3 Rally2 | 6:16:35.1 | +1:38:37.7 | 0 | 0 |
| 44 | 21 | 47 | Henk Vossen | Saskia Bleijenberg | Henk Vossen | Hyundai i20 N Rally2 | 6:26:16.9 | +1:48:19.5 | 0 | 0 |
| Retired SS16 | | 29 | Pablo Sarrazin | Yannick Roche | Pablo Sarrazin | Citroën C3 Rally2 | Accident | | 0 | 0 |
| Retired SS3 | | 27 | Filip Mareš | Radovan Bucha | Filip Mareš | Toyota GR Yaris Rally2 | Accident | | 0 | 0 |
| Retired SS2 | | 44 | Luciano Cobbe | Roberto Mometti | Luciano Cobbe | Škoda Fabia RS Rally2 | Accident | | 0 | 0 |

==== Special stages ====
Overall
| Stage | Winners | Car | Time | Class leaders |
|---|---|---|---|---|
| SD | Gryazin / Aleksandrov | Lancia Ypsilon Rally2 HF Integrale | 2:42.9 | —N/a |
| SS1 | Gryazin / Aleksandrov | Lancia Ypsilon Rally2 HF Integrale | 16:44.8 | Gryazin / Aleksandrov |
| SS2 | Camilli / de la Haye | Škoda Fabia RS Rally2 | 17:52.1 | Camilli / de la Haye |
| SS3 | Stage cancelled | | | |
| SS4 | Pelamourges / Pouget | Hyundai i20 N Rally2 | 14:39.9 | L. Rossel / Mercoiret |
| SS5 | L. Rossel / Mercoiret | Citroën C3 Rally2 | 19:10.0 | L. Rossel / Mercoiret |
| SS6 | Y. Rossel / Dunand | Lancia Ypsilon Rally2 HF Integrale | 13:28.3 | L. Rossel / Mercoiret |
| SS7 | L. Rossel / Mercoiret | Citroën C3 Rally2 | 12:47.2 | L. Rossel / Mercoiret |
| SS8 | Camilli / de la Haye | Škoda Fabia RS Rally2 | 19:14.6 | L. Rossel / Mercoiret |
| SS9 | L. Rossel / Mercoiret | Citroën C3 Rally2 | 12:54.0 | L. Rossel / Mercoiret |
| SS10 | Y. Rossel / Dunand | Lancia Ypsilon Rally2 HF Integrale | 27:56.5 | L. Rossel / Mercoiret |
| SS11 | Y. Rossel / Dunand | Lancia Ypsilon Rally2 HF Integrale | 11:57.2 | L. Rossel / Mercoiret |
| SS12 | Daprà / Guglielmetti | Škoda Fabia RS Rally2 | 23:42.0 | L. Rossel / Mercoiret |
| SS13 | L. Rossel / Mercoiret | Citroën C3 Rally2 | 2:26.1 | L. Rossel / Mercoiret |
| SS14 | Y. Rossel / Dunand | Lancia Ypsilon Rally2 HF Integrale | 13:34.8 | L. Rossel / Mercoiret |
| SS15 | Y. Rossel / Dunand | Lancia Ypsilon Rally2 HF Integrale | 23:08.3 | L. Rossel / Mercoiret |
| SS16 | Y. Rossel / Dunand | Lancia Ypsilon Rally2 HF Integrale | 10:44.8 | L. Rossel / Mercoiret |
| SS17 | Y. Rossel / Dunand | Lancia Ypsilon Rally2 HF Integrale | 20:27.1 | L. Rossel / Mercoiret |

Challenger
| Stage | Winners | Car | Time | Class leaders |
|---|---|---|---|---|
| SD | Gryazin / Aleksandrov | Lancia Ypsilon Rally2 HF Integrale | 2:42.9 | —N/a |
| SS1 | Gryazin / Aleksandrov | Lancia Ypsilon Rally2 HF Integrale | 16:44.8 | Gryazin / Aleksandrov |
| SS2 | L. Rossel / Mercoiret | Citroën C3 Rally2 | 17:55.1 | L. Rossel / Mercoiret |
| SS3 | Stage cancelled | | | |
| SS4 | Pelamourges / Pouget | Hyundai i20 N Rally2 | 14:39.9 | L. Rossel / Mercoiret |
| SS5 | L. Rossel / Mercoiret | Citroën C3 Rally2 | 19:10.0 | L. Rossel / Mercoiret |
| SS6 | Daprà / Guglielmetti | Škoda Fabia RS Rally2 | 13:30.6 | L. Rossel / Mercoiret |
| SS7 | L. Rossel / Mercoiret | Citroën C3 Rally2 | 12:47.2 | L. Rossel / Mercoiret |
| SS8 | L. Rossel / Mercoiret | Citroën C3 Rally2 | 19:29.7 | L. Rossel / Mercoiret |
| SS9 | L. Rossel / Mercoiret | Citroën C3 Rally2 | 12:54.0 | L. Rossel / Mercoiret |
| SS10 | Gryazin / Aleksandrov | Lancia Ypsilon Rally2 HF Integrale | 28:23.8 | L. Rossel / Mercoiret |
| SS11 | Pelamourges / Pouget | Hyundai i20 N Rally2 | 12:23.6 | L. Rossel / Mercoiret |
| SS12 | Daprà / Guglielmetti | Škoda Fabia RS Rally2 | 23:42.0 | L. Rossel / Mercoiret |
| SS13 | L. Rossel / Mercoiret | Citroën C3 Rally2 | 2:26.1 | L. Rossel / Mercoiret |
| SS14 | Chatillon / Cornuau | Škoda Fabia RS Rally2 | 13:58.1 | L. Rossel / Mercoiret |
| SS15 | Gryazin / Aleksandrov | Lancia Ypsilon Rally2 HF Integrale | 23:37.0 | L. Rossel / Mercoiret |
| SS16 | L. Rossel / Mercoiret | Citroën C3 Rally2 | 10:58.7 | L. Rossel / Mercoiret |
| SS17 | Gryazin / Aleksandrov | Lancia Ypsilon Rally2 HF Integrale | 20:49.3 | L. Rossel / Mercoiret |

==== Championship standings ====
Drivers' Standings
| Move | Pos. | Driver | Points |
|---|---|---|---|
| New entry | 1 | Léo Rossel | 25 |
| New entry | 2 | Roberto Daprà | 17 |
| New entry | 3 | Arthur Pelamourges | 15 |
| New entry | 4 | Eric Camilli | 12 |
| New entry | 5 | Chris Ingram | 10 |

Co-drivers' Standings
| Move | Pos. | Driver | Points |
|---|---|---|---|
| New entry | 1 | Guillaume Mercoiret | 25 |
| New entry | 2 | Luca Guglielmetti | 17 |
| New entry | 3 | Bastien Pouget | 15 |
| New entry | 4 | Thibault de la Haye | 12 |
| New entry | 5 | Alexander Kihurani | 10 |

Manufacturers' Standings
| Move | Pos. | Driver | Points |
|---|---|---|---|
| New entry | 1 | Lancia Corse HF | 42 |

Challenger Drivers' Standings
| Move | Pos. | Driver | Points |
|---|---|---|---|
| New entry | 1 | Léo Rossel | 25 |
| New entry | 2 | Roberto Daprà | 17 |
| New entry | 3 | Arthur Pelamourges | 15 |
| New entry | 4 | Chris Ingram | 12 |
| New entry | 5 | Nikolay Gryazin | 10 |

Challenger Co-drivers' Standings
| Move | Pos. | Driver | Points |
|---|---|---|---|
| New entry | 1 | Guillaume Mercoiret | 25 |
| New entry | 2 | Luca Guglielmetti | 17 |
| New entry | 3 | Bastien Pouget | 15 |
| New entry | 4 | Alexander Kihurani | 12 |
| New entry | 5 | Konstantin Aleksandrov | 10 |

=== WRC3 Rally3 ===
==== Classification ====
| Position | | No. | Driver | Co-driver | Entrant | Car | Time | Difference | Points | |
| Event | Class | No. | Driver | Co-driver | Entrant | Car | Time | Difference | Class | Event |
|---|---|---|---|---|---|---|---|---|---|---|
| 28 | 1 | 51 | Eric Royère | Alexis Grenier | Eric Royère | Ford Fiesta Rally3 | 5:36:47.5 | 0.0 | 25 | 0 |
| 31 | 2 | 49 | Matteo Fontana | Alessandro Arnaboldi | Matteo Fontana | Ford Fiesta Rally3 | 5:40:46.6 | +3:59.1 | 17 | 2 |
| 33 | 3 | 50 | Ghjuvanni Rossi | Kylian Sarmezan | Ghjuvanni Rossi | Ford Fiesta Rally3 | 5:55:37.9 | +18:50.4 | 15 | 0 |
| Retired SS13 | | 52 | Jean-Christophe Guibert | Laurent Gracial | Jean-Christophe Guibert | Ford Fiesta Rally3 | Oil pressure | | 0 | 0 |
| Retired SS3 | | 53 | Olivier Courtois | Hubert Risser | Olivier Courtois | Renault Clio Rally3 | Accident damage | | 0 | 0 |

==== Special stages ====
| Stage | Winners | Car | Time | Class leaders |
|---|---|---|---|---|
| SD | Fontana / Arnaboldi | Ford Fiesta Rally3 | 2:53.3 | —N/a |
| SS1 | Fontana / Arnaboldi | Ford Fiesta Rally3 | 18:01.7 | Fontana / Arnaboldi |
| SS2 | Rossi / Sarmezan | Ford Fiesta Rally3 | 20:00.5 | Rossi / Sarmezan |
| SS3 | Stage cancelled | | | |
| SS4 | Fontana / Arnaboldi | Ford Fiesta Rally3 | 15:40.6 | Rossi / Sarmezan |
| SS5 | Fontana / Arnaboldi | Ford Fiesta Rally3 | 21:08.8 | Rossi / Sarmezan |
| SS6 | Fontana / Arnaboldi | Ford Fiesta Rally3 | 14:36.2 | Rossi / Sarmezan |
| SS7 | Fontana / Arnaboldi | Ford Fiesta Rally3 | 14:04.6 | Rossi / Sarmezan |
| SS8 | Fontana / Arnaboldi | Ford Fiesta Rally3 | 29:45.9 | Rossi / Sarmezan |
| SS9 | Stage cancelled | | | |
| SS10 | Fontana / Arnaboldi | Ford Fiesta Rally3 | 28:37.3 | Rossi / Sarmezan |
| SS11 | Fontana / Arnaboldi | Ford Fiesta Rally3 | 12:03.4 | Royère / Grenier |
| SS12 | Fontana / Arnaboldi | Ford Fiesta Rally3 | 24:39.8 | Royère / Grenier |
| SS13 | Fontana / Arnaboldi | Ford Fiesta Rally3 | 2:38.5 | Royère / Grenier |
| SS14 | Fontana / Arnaboldi | Ford Fiesta Rally3 | 13:32.6 | Royère / Grenier |
| SS15 | Fontana / Arnaboldi | Ford Fiesta Rally3 | 23:07.2 | Royère / Grenier |
| SS16 | Fontana / Arnaboldi | Ford Fiesta Rally3 | 10:42.6 | Royère / Grenier |
| SS17 | Fontana / Arnaboldi | Ford Fiesta Rally3 | 21:02.3 | Royère / Grenier |

==== Championship standings ====
Drivers' Standings
| Move | Pos. | Driver | Points |
|---|---|---|---|
| New entry | 1 | Eric Royère | 25 |
| New entry | 2 | Matteo Fontana | 17 |
| New entry | 3 | Ghjuvanni Rossi | 15 |

Co-drivers' Standings
| Move | Pos. | Driver | Points |
|---|---|---|---|
| New entry | 1 | Alexis Grenier | 25 |
| New entry | 2 | Alessandro Arnaboldi | 17 |
| New entry | 3 | Kylian Sarmezan | 15 |

== Notes ==
| Previous rally: 2025 Rally Saudi Arabia (2025) | 2026 FIA World Rally Championship | Next rally: 2026 Rally Sweden |
| Previous rally: 2025 Monte Carlo Rally | 2026 Monte Carlo Rally | Next rally: 2027 Monte Carlo Rally |
