= 2026 Acropolis Rally =

70th edition of the Acropolis Rally

2026 Acropolis Rally EKO Acropolis Rally Greece 2026
Round 8 of 13 in the 2026 World Rally Championship
← Previous event	Next event →
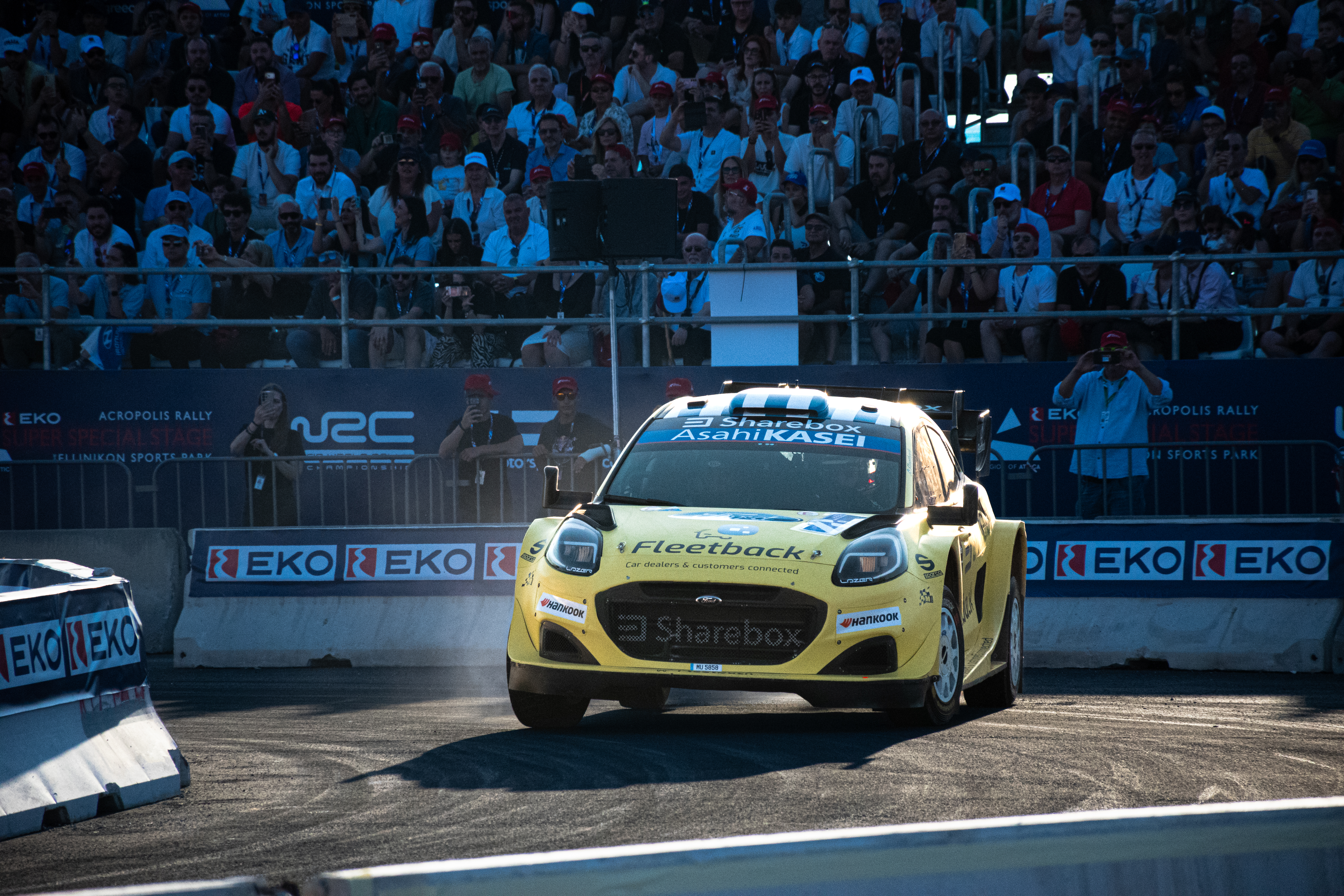
- Local hero Jourdan Serderidis driving a Ford Puma Rally1 during the rally.
- Host country: Greece
- Rally base: Loutraki, Corinthia
- Dates run: 25 – 28 June 2026
- Start location: Loutraki, Corinthia
- Finish location: Loutraki, Corinthia
- Stages: 17 (323.31 km; 200.90 miles)
- Stage surface: Gravel
- Transport distance: 1,165.32 km (724.10 miles)
- Overall distance: 1,488.63 km (924.99 miles)

Statistics
- Crews registered: 58
- Crews: 57 at start, 45 at finish

Overall results
- Overall winner: (France) Sébastien Ogier (France) Vincent Landais (Japan) Toyota Gazoo Racing WRT; 3:36:40.7
- Sunday Accumulated leader: (France) Sébastien Ogier (France) Vincent Landais (Japan) Toyota Gazoo Racing WRT; 56:17.9
- Power Stage winner: (France) Sébastien Ogier (France) Vincent Landais (Japan) Toyota Gazoo Racing WRT; 11:10.9

Support category results
- WRC-2 winner: (Estonia) Robert Virves (Estonia) Jakko Viilo (Germany) Toksport WRT; 3:46:30.8
- WRC-3 winner: (Italy) Matteo Fontana (Italy) Alessandro Arnaboldi; 4:08:21.5

The 2026 Acropolis Rally (also known as the EKO Acropolis Rally Greece 2026) was a motor racing event for rally cars held over four days from 25 to 28 June 2026. It marked the seventieth running of the Acropolis Rally, and was the eighth round of the 2026 World Rally Championship, 2026 WRC2 Championship and 2026 WRC3 Championship. The 2026 event was based in Loutraki in Corinthia and consisted of seventeen special stages, covering a total competitive distance of 323.31 km (200.90 mi).

Ott Tänak and Martin Järveoja were the defending rally winners, but they did not defend their titles as Tänak announced his indefinite break from the championship following the end of the 2025 season. Hyundai Shell Mobis WRT, The team they drove for in 2025, were the defending manufacturer's winners. Oliver Solberg and Elliott Edmondson were the defending rally winners in the WRC2 championship, but they did not defend their titles as they were signed by Toyota to contest the top tier this season. Ali Türkkan and Oytun Albayrak were the defending rally winners in the WRC3 championship.

Sébastien Ogier and Vincent Landais won their second rally of the season, and Toyota Gazoo Racing WRT were the manufacturer's winners. Robert Virves and Jakko Viilo were the winners in the WRC2 category. Matteo Fontana and Alessandro Arnaboldi were the winners in the WRC3 category.

== Background ==
=== Entry list ===
The following crews entered into the rally. The event was opened to crews competing in the World Rally Championship, its support categories, the WRC2 Championship, the WRC3 Championship and privateer entries that were not registered to score points in any championship. Twelve crews entered under Rally1 regulations, as were twenty-nine Rally2 crews in the WRC2 Championship and seven Rally3 crews in the WRC3 Championship.

Rally1 entries competing in the World Rally Championship
No.	Driver	Co-Driver	Entrant	Car	Championship eligibility	Tyre
1	(France) Sébastien Ogier	(France) Vincent Landais	(Japan) Toyota Gazoo Racing WRT	Toyota GR Yaris Rally1	Driver, Co-driver, Manufacturer	H
5	(Finland) Sami Pajari	(Finland) Marko Salminen	(Japan) Toyota Gazoo Racing WRT2	Toyota GR Yaris Rally1	Driver, Co-driver, Manufacturer, Team	H
6	(Spain) Dani Sordo	(Spain) Cándido Carrera	(South Korea) Hyundai Shell Mobis WRT	Hyundai i20 N Rally1	Driver, Co-driver, Manufacturer	H
9	(Greece) Jourdan Serderidis	(Belgium) Frédéric Miclotte	(United Kingdom) M-Sport Ford WRT	Ford Puma Rally1	Driver, Co-driver	H
11	(Belgium) Thierry Neuville	(Belgium) Martijn Wydaeghe	(South Korea) Hyundai Shell Mobis WRT	Hyundai i20 N Rally1	Driver, Co-driver, Manufacturer	H
16	(France) Adrien Fourmaux	(France) Alexandre Coria	(South Korea) Hyundai Shell Mobis WRT	Hyundai i20 N Rally1	Driver, Co-driver, Manufacturer	H
18	(Japan) Takamoto Katsuta	(Republic of Ireland) Aaron Johnston	(Japan) Toyota Gazoo Racing WRT	Toyota GR Yaris Rally1	Driver, Co-driver	H
22	(Latvia) Mārtiņš Sesks	(Latvia) Renārs Francis	(United Kingdom) M-Sport Ford WRT	Ford Puma Rally1	Driver, Co-driver	H
33	(United Kingdom) Elfyn Evans	(United Kingdom) Scott Martin	(Japan) Toyota Gazoo Racing WRT	Toyota GR Yaris Rally1	Driver, Co-driver, Manufacturer	H
55	(Republic of Ireland) Josh McErlean	(Republic of Ireland) Eoin Treacy	(United Kingdom) M-Sport Ford WRT	Ford Puma Rally1	Driver, Co-driver, Manufacturer	H
95	(Republic of Ireland) Jon Armstrong	(Republic of Ireland) Shane Byrne	(United Kingdom) M-Sport Ford WRT	Ford Puma Rally1	Driver, Co-driver, Manufacturer	H
99	(Sweden) Oliver Solberg	(United Kingdom) Elliott Edmondson	(Japan) Toyota Gazoo Racing WRT	Toyota GR Yaris Rally1	Driver, Co-driver, Manufacturer	H

Rally2 entries competing in the WRC2 Championship
No.	Driver	Co-Driver	Entrant	Car	Championship eligibility	Tyre
20	(France) Yohan Rossel	(France) Arnaud Dunand	(Italy) Lancia Corse HF	Lancia Ypsilon Rally2 HF Integrale	Driver, Co-driver	H
21	(France) Léo Rossel	(France) Guillaume Mercoiret	(France) 2C Junior Team	Lancia Ypsilon Rally2 HF Integrale	Challenger Driver, Challenger Co-driver, Team	H
23	(Finland) Roope Korhonen	(Finland) Anssi Viinikka	(Finland) Rautio Motorsport	Toyota GR Yaris Rally2	Challenger Driver, Challenger Co-driver	H
24	(Spain) Alejandro Cachón	(Spain) Borja Rozada	(Spain) Toyota España	Toyota GR Yaris Rally2	Challenger Driver, Challenger Co-driver	H
25	(Italy) Roberto Daprà	(Italy) Luca Guglielmetti	(Italy) Roberto Daprà	Škoda Fabia RS Rally2	Challenger Driver, Challenger Co-driver	H
26	(Norway) Andreas Mikkelsen	(Norway) Jørn Listerud	(Germany) Toksport WRT	Škoda Fabia RS Rally2	Driver, Co-driver, Team	H
27	(Estonia) Robert Virves	(Estonia) Jakko Viilo	(Germany) Toksport WRT	Škoda Fabia RS Rally2	Challenger Driver, Challenger Co-driver, Team	H
28	(United Kingdom) Gus Greensmith	(Sweden) Jonas Andersson	(United Kingdom) Gus Greensmith	Toyota GR Yaris Rally2	Driver, Co-driver	H
29	(Spain) Jan Solans	(Spain) Rodrigo Sanjuan de Eusebio	(Spain) PH.Ph	Toyota GR Yaris Rally2	Challenger Driver, Challenger Co-driver	H
30	(Japan) Yuki Yamamoto	(Republic of Ireland) James Fulton	(Finland) Printsport	Toyota GR Yaris Rally2	Challenger Driver, Co-driver	H
31	(Paraguay) Diego Domínguez Jr.	(Spain) Rogelio Peñate	(Paraguay) Diego Domínguez Jr.	Toyota GR Yaris Rally2	Challenger Driver, Challenger Co-driver	H
32	(Sweden) Mille Johansson	(Sweden) Johan Grönvall	(Sweden) Mille Johansson	Škoda Fabia RS Rally2	Challenger Driver, Challenger Co-driver	H
34	(France) Mattéo Chatillon	(France) Maxence Cornuau	(France) Mattéo Chatillon	Škoda Fabia RS Rally2	Challenger Driver, Challenger Co-driver	H
35	(Netherlands) Bernhard ten Brinke	(United Kingdom) Tom Woodburn	(Netherlands) Bernhard ten Brinke	Toyota GR Yaris Rally2	Challenger Driver, Challenger Co-driver	H
37	(Paraguay) Andrea Lafarja	(Paraguay) Germán Maune	(Paraguay) Andrea Lafarja	Toyota GR Yaris Rally2	Challenger/Masters Driver, Challenger Co-driver	H
38	(Czech Republic) Martin Prokop	(Czech Republic) Michal Ernst	(Czech Republic) Martin Prokop	Škoda Fabia RS Rally2	Challenger Driver, Challenger Co-driver	H
39	(Greece) Lambros Athanassoulas	(Greece) Nikolaos Zakheos	(Greece) Lambros Athanassoulas	Hyundai i20 N Rally2	Challenger Driver, Challenger Co-driver	H
40	(France) Pablo Sarrazin	(France) Yannick Roche	(France) Pablo Sarrazin	Lancia Ypsilon Rally2 HF Integrale	Challenger Driver, Challenger Co-driver	H
41	(Turkey) Ali Türkkan	(Turkey) Oytun Albaykar	(Turkey) TOSFED	Ford Fiesta Rally2	Challenger Driver, Challenger Co-driver	H
42	(Paraguay) Alejandro Galanti	(Argentina) Marcelo Toyotoshi	(Paraguay) Alejandro Galanti	Toyota GR Yaris Rally2	Challenger Driver, Challenger Co-driver	H
43	(Greece) Panagiotis Roustemis	(Greece) Christos Bakloris	(Greece) Panagiotis Roustemis	Škoda Fabia RS Rally2	Challenger Driver, Challenger Co-driver	H
44	(Greece) Epaminondas Karanikolas	(Greece) Giorgos Kakavas	(Greece) Epaminondas Karanikolas	Ford Fiesta Rally2	Challenger Driver, Challenger Co-driver	H
45	(United States) Conner Martell	(Italy) Alex Gelsomino	(France) 2C Junior Team	Lancia Ypsilon Rally2 HF Integrale	Challenger Driver, Challenger Co-driver, Team	H
46	(Mexico) Alejandro Mauro	(Spain) Ariday Bonilla	(Mexico) Alejandro Mauro	Škoda Fabia RS Rally2	Challenger Driver, Challenger Co-driver	H
47	(Mexico) Miguel Granados	(Spain) Marc Martí	(Mexico) Miguel Granados	Škoda Fabia RS Rally2	Challenger/Masters Driver, Masters Co-driver	H
48	(France) Adrien Mosca	(France) Julie Amblard	(Finland) Printsport	Toyota GR Yaris Rally2	Challenger Driver, Challenger Co-driver	H
49	(Turkey) Uğur Soylu	(Turkey) Mehmet Akif Yalçın	(Turkey) GP Garage My Team	Škoda Fabia RS Rally2	Challenger/Masters Driver, Challenger Co-driver	H
50	(Austria) Johannes Keferböck	(Austria) Ilka Minor	(Austria) Johannes Keferböck	Toyota GR Yaris Rally2	Challenger/Masters Driver, Masters Co-driver	H
51	(Romania) Cristian Dolofan	(Romania) Traian Pavel	(Romania) Cristian Dolofan	Citroën C3 Rally2	Challenger Driver, Challenger Co-driver	H

Rally3 entries competing in the WRC3 Championship and/or the Junior World Rally Championship
No.	Driver	Co-Driver	Entrant	Car	Class eligibility	Tyre
52	(Italy) Matteo Fontana	(Italy) Alessandro Arnaboldi	(Italy) Matteo Fontana	Ford Fiesta Rally3	WRC3	H
53	(Poland) Tymoteusz Abramowski	(Poland) Jakub Wróbel	(Poland) Tymoteusz Abramowski	Ford Fiesta Rally3	WRC3	H
54	(Greece) Georgios Vasilakis	(Republic of Ireland) Allan Harryman	(Greece) Georgios Vasilakis	Ford Fiesta Rally3	WRC3, Masters Driver, Masters Co-Driver	H
56	(Bolivia) Nataniel Bruun	(Spain) Javier Martínez	(Bolivia) Nataniel Bruun	Ford Fiesta Rally3	WRC3	H
57	(Poland) Grzegorz Bonder	(Poland) Kamil Heller	(Poland) Grzegorz Bonder	Ford Fiesta Rally3	WRC3	H
58	(Greece) Andreas Vardinogiannis	(Greece) Konstantinos Stefanis	(Greece) Andreas Vardinogiannis	Ford Fiesta Rally3	WRC3	H
59	(Greece) Nikos Davaris	(Greece) Konstantinos Makris	(Greece) Nikos Davaris	Ford Fiesta Rally3	WRC3, Masters Driver, Masters Co-Driver	H

Other major entries
No.	Driver	Co-Driver	Entrant	Car	Tyre
36	(Estonia) Romet Jürgenson	(Estonia) Siim Oja	(United Kingdom) M-Sport Ford WRT	Ford Fiesta Rally2	H

=== Itinerary ===
All dates and times are EEST (UTC+3).

Date	No.	Time span	Stage name	Distance
25 June	—	After 9:01	[Shakedown]	3.34 km
25 June	SS1	After 19:05	EKO SSS	1.86 km
25 June		21:04 – 21:19	Service A, Loutraki	—N/a
26 June	SS2	After 8:48	Bauxites	22.97 km
26 June	SS3	After 9:51	Parnassos Mt	22.28 km
26 June	SS4	After 11:14	Stiri 1	24.18 km
26 June		12:02 – 12:32	Regroup, Livadeia	—N/a
26 June		12:32 – 12:52	Remote service B, Livadeia	—N/a
26 June	SS5	After 13:35	Elikon Mt	17.80 km
26 June	SS6	After 14:46	Stiri 2	24.18 km
26 June	SS7	After 16:56	Thiva	17.81 km
26 June		19:40 – 20:25	Flexi service C, Loutraki	—N/a
27 June	SS8	After 7:54	Ghymno 1	19.60 km
27 June	SS9	After 9:19	Kolines	21.30 km
27 June	SS10	After 11:05	Menalo Mt 1	14.78 km
27 June	SS11	After 12:58	Kefalari	18.17 km
27 June		14:20 – 14:59	Regroup, Loutraki	—N/a
27 June		14:59 – 15:29	Service D, Loutraki	—N/a
27 June	SS12	After 16:39	Ghymno 2	19.60 km
27 June	SS13	After 19:05	Menalo Mt 1	14.78 km
27 June		21:30 – 22:15	Flexi service E, Loutraki	—N/a
28 June	SS14	After 8:28	Aghii Theodori 1	25.39 km
28 June	SS15	After 9:35	Loutraki 1	16.61 km
28 June		10:17 – 10:52	Regroup, Loutraki	—N/a
28 June		10:52 – 11:22	Service F, Loutraki	—N/a
28 June	SS16	After 12:10	Aghii Theodori 2	25.39 km
28 June		12:50 – 13:39	Regroup, Loutraki	—N/a
28 June	SS17	After 14:15	Loutraki 2 [Power Stage]	16.61 km
28 June		After 14:35	Podium ceremony, Loutraki	—N/a

== Report ==
=== WRC Rally1 ===
==== Classification ====
Position		No.	Driver	Co-driver	Entrant	Car	Time	Difference	Points			
Event	Class	No.	Driver	Co-driver	Entrant	Car	Time	Difference	Event	Sunday	Stage	Total
1	1	1	Sébastien Ogier	Vincent Landais	Toyota Gazoo Racing WRT	Toyota GR Yaris Rally1	3:36:40.7	0.0	25	5	5	35
2	2	11	Thierry Neuville	Martijn Wydaeghe	Hyundai Shell Mobis WRT	Hyundai i20 N Rally1	3:37:39.0	+58.3	17	2	3	22
3	3	18	Takamoto Katsuta	Aaron Johnston	Toyota Gazoo Racing WRT	Toyota GR Yaris Rally1	3:39:45.5	+3:04.8	15	3	2	20
4	4	5	Sami Pajari	Marko Salminen	Toyota Gazoo Racing WRT2	Toyota GR Yaris Rally1	3:41:42.9	+5:02.2	12	4	4	20
5	5	33	Elfyn Evans	Scott Martin	Toyota Gazoo Racing WRT	Toyota GR Yaris Rally1	3:42:35.6	+5:54.9	10	0	1	11
6	6	55	Josh McErlean	Eoin Treacy	M-Sport Ford WRT	Ford Puma Rally1	3:42:36.2	+5:55.5	8	0	0	8
7	7	16	Adrien Fourmaux	Alexandre Coria	Hyundai Shell Mobis WRT	Hyundai i20 N Rally1	3:42:49.4	+6:08.7	6	0	0	6
8	8	22	Mārtiņš Sesks	Renārs Francis	M-Sport Ford WRT	Ford Puma Rally1	3:44:46.5	+8:05.8	4	0	0	4
16	9	99	Oliver Solberg	Elliott Edmondson	Toyota Gazoo Racing WRT	Toyota GR Yaris Rally1	3:52:11.9	+15:31.2	0	1	0	1
20	10	95	Jon Armstrong	Shane Byrne	M-Sport Ford WRT	Ford Puma Rally1	3:54:44.3	+18:03.6	0	0	0	0
32	11	9	Jourdan Serderidis	Frédéric Miclotte	M-Sport Ford WRT	Ford Puma Rally1	4:21:27.9	+44:47.2	0	0	0	0
Retired SS17		6	Dani Sordo	Cándido Carrera	Hyundai Shell Mobis WRT	Hyundai i20 N Rally1	Withdrawn		0	0	0	0

==== Special stages ====
Stage	Winners	Car	Time	Class leaders
SD	Neuville / Wydaeghe	Hyundai i20 N Rally1	2:13.4	—N/a
SS1	Ogier / Landais	Toyota GR Yaris Rally1	1:38.2	Ogier / Landais
SS2	Fourmaux / Coria	Hyundai i20 N Rally1	13:42.8	Neuville / Wydaeghe
SS3	Fourmaux / Coria	Hyundai i20 N Rally1	17:44.3	Fourmaux / Coria
SS4	Ogier / Landais	Toyota GR Yaris Rally1	14:52.9	Neuville / Wydaeghe
SS5	Armstrong / Byrne	Ford Puma Rally1	11:34.6	Neuville / Wydaeghe
SS6	Neuville / Wydaeghe	Hyundai i20 N Rally1	14:38.1	Neuville / Wydaeghe
SS7	Fourmaux / Coria	Hyundai i20 N Rally1	12:24.6	Neuville / Wydaeghe
SS8	Ogier / Landais	Toyota GR Yaris Rally1	13:47.8	Neuville / Wydaeghe
SS9	Fourmaux / Coria	Hyundai i20 N Rally1	16:54.5	Neuville / Wydaeghe
SS10	Neuville / Wydaeghe	Hyundai i20 N Rally1	9:51.2	Neuville / Wydaeghe
SS11	Ogier / Landais	Toyota GR Yaris Rally1	12:57.6	Neuville / Wydaeghe
SS12	Neuville / Wydaeghe	Hyundai i20 N Rally1	10:14.5	Neuville / Wydaeghe
SS13	Ogier / Landais	Toyota GR Yaris Rally1	9:29.3	Neuville / Wydaeghe
SS14	Fourmaux / Coria	Hyundai i20 N Rally1	16:58.1	Ogier / Landais
SS15	Ogier / Landais	Toyota GR Yaris Rally1	11:19.6	Ogier / Landais
SS15	Neuville / Wydaeghe	Hyundai i20 N Rally1	11:19.6	Ogier / Landais
SS16	Ogier / Landais	Toyota GR Yaris Rally1	16:49.0	Ogier / Landais
SS17	Ogier / Landais	Toyota GR Yaris Rally1	11:10.9	Ogier / Landais

==== Championship standings ====
Drivers' Standings
Move	Pos.	Driver	Points
	1	Elfyn Evans	162
	2	Takamoto Katsuta	151
2	3	Sébastien Ogier	125
	4	Sami Pajari	116
2	5	Oliver Solberg	103

Co-drivers' Standings
Move	Pos.	Driver	Points
	1	Scott Martin	162
	2	Aaron Johnston	151
2	3	Vincent Landais	125
	4	Marko Salminen	116
2	5	Elliott Edmondson	103

Manufacturers' Standings
Move	Pos.	Driver	Points
	1	Toyota Gazoo Racing WRT	420
	2	Hyundai Shell Mobis WRT	274
	3	Toyota Gazoo Racing WRT2	129
	4	M-Sport Ford WRT	102

=== WRC2 Rally2 ===
==== Classification ====
Position		No.	Driver	Co-driver	Entrant	Car	Time	Difference	Points	
Event	Class	No.	Driver	Co-driver	Entrant	Car	Time	Difference	Class	Event
9	1	27	Robert Virves	Jakko Viilo	Toksport WRT	Škoda Fabia RS Rally2	3:46:30.8	0.0	25	2
10	2	26	Andreas Mikkelsen	Jørn Listerud	Toksport WRT	Škoda Fabia RS Rally2	3:47:33.2	+1:02.4	17	1
11	3	24	Alejandro Cachón	Borja Rozada	Toyota España	Toyota GR Yaris Rally2	3:48:34.0	+2:03.2	15	0
12	4	23	Roope Korhonen	Anssi Viinikka	Rautio Motorsport	Toyota GR Yaris Rally2	3:49:24.1	+2:53.3	12	0
13	5	31	Diego Domínguez Jr.	Rogelio Peñate	Diego Domínguez Jr.	Toyota GR Yaris Rally2	3:50:13.9	+3:43.1	10	0
14	6	21	Roope Korhonen	Anssi Viinikka	Rautio Motorsport	Toyota GR Yaris Rally2	3:50:41.4	+4:10.6	8	0
15	7	40	Pablo Sarrazin	Yannick Roche	Pablo Sarrazin	Lancia Ypsilon Rally2 HF Integrale	3:51:00.0	+4:29.2	6	0
17	8	29	Jan Solans	Rodrigo Sanjuan de Eusebio	PH.Ph	Toyota GR Yaris Rally2	3:52:51.7	+6:20.9	4	0
18	9	34	Mattéo Chatillon	Maxence Cornuau	Mattéo Chatillon	Škoda Fabia RS Rally2	3:53:33.6	+7:02.8	2	0
19	10	30	Yuki Yamamoto	James Fulton	Printsport	Toyota GR Yaris Rally2	3:54:28.4	+7:57.6	1	0
21	11	46	Alejandro Mauro	Ariday Bonilla	Alejandro Mauro	Škoda Fabia RS Rally2	4:04:57.6	+18:26.8	0	0
22	12	47	Yuki Yamamoto	James Fulton	Printsport	Toyota GR Yaris Rally2	4:06:23.4	+19:52.6	0	0
24	13	49	Uğur Soylu	Mehmet Akif Yalçın	GP Garage My Team	Škoda Fabia RS Rally2	4:08:40.5	+22:09.7	0	0
27	14	44	Epaminondas Karanikolas	Giorgos Kakavas	Epaminondas Karanikolas	Ford Fiesta Rally2	4:10:56.3	+24:25.5	0	0
28	15	42	Alejandro Galanti	Marcelo Toyotoshi	Alejandro Galanti	Toyota GR Yaris Rally2	4:10:58.5	+24:27.7	0	0
31	16	51	Cristian Dolofan	Traian Pavel	Cristian Dolofan	Citroën C3 Rally2	4:20:28.7	+33:57.9	0	0
35	17	25	Roberto Daprà	Luca Guglielmetti	Roberto Daprà	Škoda Fabia RS Rally2	4:40:39.2	+54:08.4	0	0
36	18	37	Andrea Lafarja	Germán Maune	Andrea Lafarja	Toyota GR Yaris Rally2	4:44:56.1	+58:25.3	0	0
37	19	28	Gus Greensmith	Jonas Andersson	Gus Greensmith	Toyota GR Yaris Rally2	4:47:23.7	+1:00:52.9	0	0
41	20	48	Adrien Mosca	Julie Amblard	Printsport	Toyota GR Yaris Rally2	4:53:25.3	+1:06:54.5	0	0
42	21	50	Johannes Keferböck	Ilka Minor	Johannes Keferböck	Toyota GR Yaris Rally2	5:03:08.7	+1:16:37.9	0	0
Retired SS15		32	Mille Johansson	Johan Grönvall	Mille Johansson	Škoda Fabia RS Rally2	Co-driver injury		0	0
Retired SS15		43	Panagiotis Roustemis	Christos Bakloris	Panagiotis Roustemis	Škoda Fabia RS Rally2	Electrical		0	0
Retired SS14		45	Conner Martell	Alex Gelsomino	2C Junior Team	Lancia Ypsilon Rally2 HF Integrale	Rolled		0	0
Retired SS13		41	Ali Türkkan	Oytun Albaykar	TOSFED	Ford Fiesta Rally2	Rolled		0	0
Retired SS10		20	Yohan Rossel	Arnaud Dunand	Lancia Corse HF	Lancia Ypsilon Rally2 HF Integrale	Engine		0	0
Retired SS8		38	Martin Prokop	Michal Ernst	Martin Prokop	Škoda Fabia RS Rally2	Engine		0	0
Retired SS8		39	Lambros Athanassoulas	Nikolaos Zakheos	Lambros Athanassoulas	Hyundai i20 N Rally2	Engine		0	0
Retired SS3		35	Bernhard ten Brinke	Tom Woodburn	Bernhard ten Brinke	Toyota GR Yaris Rally2	Mechanical		0	0

==== Special stages ====
Overall
Stage	Winners	Car	Time	Class leaders
SD	Mikkelsen / Listerud	Škoda Fabia RS Rally2	2:22.7	—N/a
SS1	Y. Rossel / Dunand	Lancia Ypsilon Rally2 HF Integrale	1:41.1	Rossel / Dunand
SS2	Mikkelsen / Listerud	Škoda Fabia RS Rally2	14:17.9	Mikkelsen / Listerud
SS3	Mikkelsen / Listerud	Škoda Fabia RS Rally2	18:13.6	Mikkelsen / Listerud
SS4	Virves / Viilo	Škoda Fabia RS Rally2	15:24.0	Mikkelsen / Listerud
SS5	Mikkelsen / Listerud	Škoda Fabia RS Rally2	11:57.2	Mikkelsen / Listerud
SS6	Solans / Sanjuan	Toyota GR Yaris Rally2	15:18.9	Mikkelsen / Listerud
SS7	Cachón / Rozada	Toyota GR Yaris Rally2	12:53.2	Mikkelsen / Listerud
SS8	Mikkelsen / Listerud	Škoda Fabia RS Rally2	14:18.2	Mikkelsen / Listerud
SS9	Virves / Viilo	Škoda Fabia RS Rally2	17:30.5	Mikkelsen / Listerud
SS10	Virves / Viilo	Škoda Fabia RS Rally2	10:13.4	Mikkelsen / Listerud
SS11	Virves / Viilo	Škoda Fabia RS Rally2	13:31.0	Mikkelsen / Listerud
SS12	Virves / Viilo	Škoda Fabia RS Rally2	10:44.3	Mikkelsen / Listerud
SS13	Mikkelsen / Listerud	Škoda Fabia RS Rally2	9:52.8	Mikkelsen / Listerud
SS14	Virves / Viilo	Škoda Fabia RS Rally2	17:52.0	Mikkelsen / Listerud
SS15	Virves / Viilo	Škoda Fabia RS Rally2	11:58.4	Virves / Viilo
SS16	Mikkelsen / Listerud	Škoda Fabia RS Rally2	17:42.3	Virves / Viilo
SS17	Yamamoto / Fulton	Toyota GR Yaris Rally2	12:01.0	Virves / Viilo

Challenger
Stage	Winners	Car	Time	Class leaders
SD	Virves / Viilo	Škoda Fabia RS Rally2	2:22.9	—N/a
SS1	L. Rossel / Mercoiret	Lancia Ypsilon Rally2 HF Integrale	1:41.2	L. Rossel / Mercoiret
SS2	Cachón / Rozada	Toyota GR Yaris Rally2	14:22.1	Cachón / Rozada
SS3	Virves / Viilo	Škoda Fabia RS Rally2	18:14.7	Virves / Viilo
SS4	Virves / Viilo	Škoda Fabia RS Rally2	15:24.0	Virves / Viilo
SS5	Virves / Viilo	Škoda Fabia RS Rally2	11:58.6	Virves / Viilo
SS6	Solans / Sanjuan	Toyota GR Yaris Rally2	15:18.9	Virves / Viilo
SS7	Cachón / Rozada	Toyota GR Yaris Rally2	12:53.2	Virves / Viilo
SS8	Virves / Viilo	Škoda Fabia RS Rally2	14:25.7	Virves / Viilo
SS9	Virves / Viilo	Škoda Fabia RS Rally2	17:30.5	Virves / Viilo
SS10	Virves / Viilo	Škoda Fabia RS Rally2	10:13.4	Virves / Viilo
SS11	Virves / Viilo	Škoda Fabia RS Rally2	13:31.0	Virves / Viilo
SS12	Virves / Viilo	Škoda Fabia RS Rally2	10:44.3	Virves / Viilo
SS13	Virves / Viilo	Škoda Fabia RS Rally2	9:55.3	Virves / Viilo
SS14	Virves / Viilo	Škoda Fabia RS Rally2	17:52.0	Virves / Viilo
SS15	Virves / Viilo	Škoda Fabia RS Rally2	11:58.4	Virves / Viilo
SS16	Daprà / Guglielmetti	Škoda Fabia RS Rally2	17:50.7	Virves / Viilo
SS17	Yamamoto / Fulton	Toyota GR Yaris Rally2	12:01.0	Virves / Viilo

==== Championship standings ====
Drivers' Standings
Move	Pos.	Driver	Points
3	1	Roope Korhonen	64
3	2	Alejandro Cachón	61
	3	Léo Rossel	60
3	4	Nikolay Gryazin	56
3	5	Yohan Rossel	52

Co-drivers' Standings
Move	Pos.	Driver	Points
3	1	Anssi Viinikka	64
3	2	Borja Rozada	61
	3	Guillaume Mercoiret	52
3	4	Konstantin Aleksandrov	56
3	5	Arnaud Dunand	52

Manufacturers' Standings
Move	Pos.	Driver	Points
1	1	Toksport WRT	168
1	2	Lancia Corse HF	163
	3	M-Sport Ford WRT	45
New entry	4	2C Junior Team	15

Challenger Drivers' Standings
Move	Pos.	Driver	Points
2	1	Roope Korhonen	77
1	2	Léo Rossel	75
1	3	Alejandro Cachón	74
2	4	Nikolay Gryazin	64
3	5	Robert Virves	50

Challenger Co-drivers' Standings
Move	Pos.	Driver	Points
2	1	Anssi Viinikka	82
1	2	Guillaume Mercoiret	79
1	3	Konstantin Aleksandrov	67
	4	Luca Guglielmetti	56
2	5	Jakko Viilo	50

=== WRC3 Rally3 ===
==== Classification ====
Position		No.	Driver	Co-driver	Entrant	Car	Time	Difference	Points
Event	Class	No.	Driver	Co-driver	Entrant	Car	Time	Difference	Points
23	1	52	Matteo Fontana	Alessandro Arnaboldi	Matteo Fontana	Ford Fiesta Rally3	4:08:21.5	0.0	25
25	2	53	Tymoteusz Abramowski	Jakub Wróbel	Tymoteusz Abramowski	Ford Fiesta Rally3	4:09:03.2	+41.7	17
30	3	58	Andreas Vardinogiannis	Konstantinos Stefanis	Andreas Vardinogiannis	Ford Fiesta Rally3	4:19:11.7	+10:50.2	15
33	4	56	Nataniel Bruun	Javier Martínez	Nataniel Bruun	Ford Fiesta Rally3	4:24:06.0	+15:44.5	12
40	5	59	Nikos Davaris	Konstantinos Makris	Nikos Davaris	Ford Fiesta Rally3	4:50:49.1	+42:27.6	10
44	6	57	Grzegorz Bonder	Kamil Heller	Grzegorz Bonder	Ford Fiesta Rally3	5:29:53.4	+1:21:31.9	8

==== Special stages ====
Stage	Winners	Car	Time	Class leaders
SD	Fontana / Arnaboldi	Ford Fiesta Rally3	2:35.6	—N/a
SS1	Fontana / Arnaboldi	Ford Fiesta Rally3	1:46.3	Fontana / Arnaboldi
SS2	Fontana / Arnaboldi	Ford Fiesta Rally3	15:24.9	Fontana / Arnaboldi
SS3	Bruun / Martínez	Ford Fiesta Rally3	19:37.7	Fontana / Arnaboldi
SS4	Bruun / Martínez	Ford Fiesta Rally3	16:58.6	Bruun / Martínez
SS5	Fontana / Arnaboldi	Ford Fiesta Rally3	12:48.4	Bruun / Martínez
SS6	Fontana / Arnaboldi	Ford Fiesta Rally3	16:41.2	Fontana / Arnaboldi
SS7	Fontana / Arnaboldi	Ford Fiesta Rally3	13:46.4	Fontana / Arnaboldi
SS8	Abramowski / Wróbel	Ford Fiesta Rally3	15:49.9	Fontana / Arnaboldi
SS9	Fontana / Arnaboldi	Ford Fiesta Rally3	18:43.8	Fontana / Arnaboldi
SS10	Bruun / Martínez	Ford Fiesta Rally3	10:51.4	Fontana / Arnaboldi
SS11	Bruun / Martínez	Ford Fiesta Rally3	14:15.6	Fontana / Arnaboldi
SS12	Stage cancelled			
SS13	Bruun / Martínez	Ford Fiesta Rally3	10:34.4	Fontana / Arnaboldi
SS14	Bruun / Martínez	Ford Fiesta Rally3	19:41.3	Fontana / Arnaboldi
SS15	Bruun / Martínez	Ford Fiesta Rally3	12:56.6	Fontana / Arnaboldi
SS16	Bruun / Martínez	Ford Fiesta Rally3	19:24.8	Fontana / Arnaboldi
SS17	Bruun / Martínez	Ford Fiesta Rally3	13:15.2	Fontana / Arnaboldi

==== Championship standings ====
Drivers' Standings
Move	Pos.	Driver	Points
	1	Matteo Fontana	100
	2	Gil Membrado	66
	3	Ghjuvanni Rossi	55
3	4	Tymoteusz Abramowski	51
1	5	Ali Türkkan	46

Co-drivers' Standings
Move	Pos.	Driver	Points
	1	Alessandro Arnaboldi	100
	2	Adrián Pérez	66
	3	Kylian Sarmezan	55
3	4	Jakub Wróbel	51
1	5	Oytun Albayrak	46

Previous rally: 2026 Rally Japan	2026 FIA World Rally Championship	Next rally: 2026 Rally Estonia
Previous rally: 2025 Acropolis Rally	2026 Acropolis Rally	Next rally: 2027 Acropolis Rally
