= 2026 Rally Islas Canarias =

50th edition of the Rally Islas Canarias

2026 Rally Islas Canarias Rally Islas Canarias – Rally of Spain 2026
Round 5 of 13 in the 2026 World Rally Championship
← Previous event	Next event →
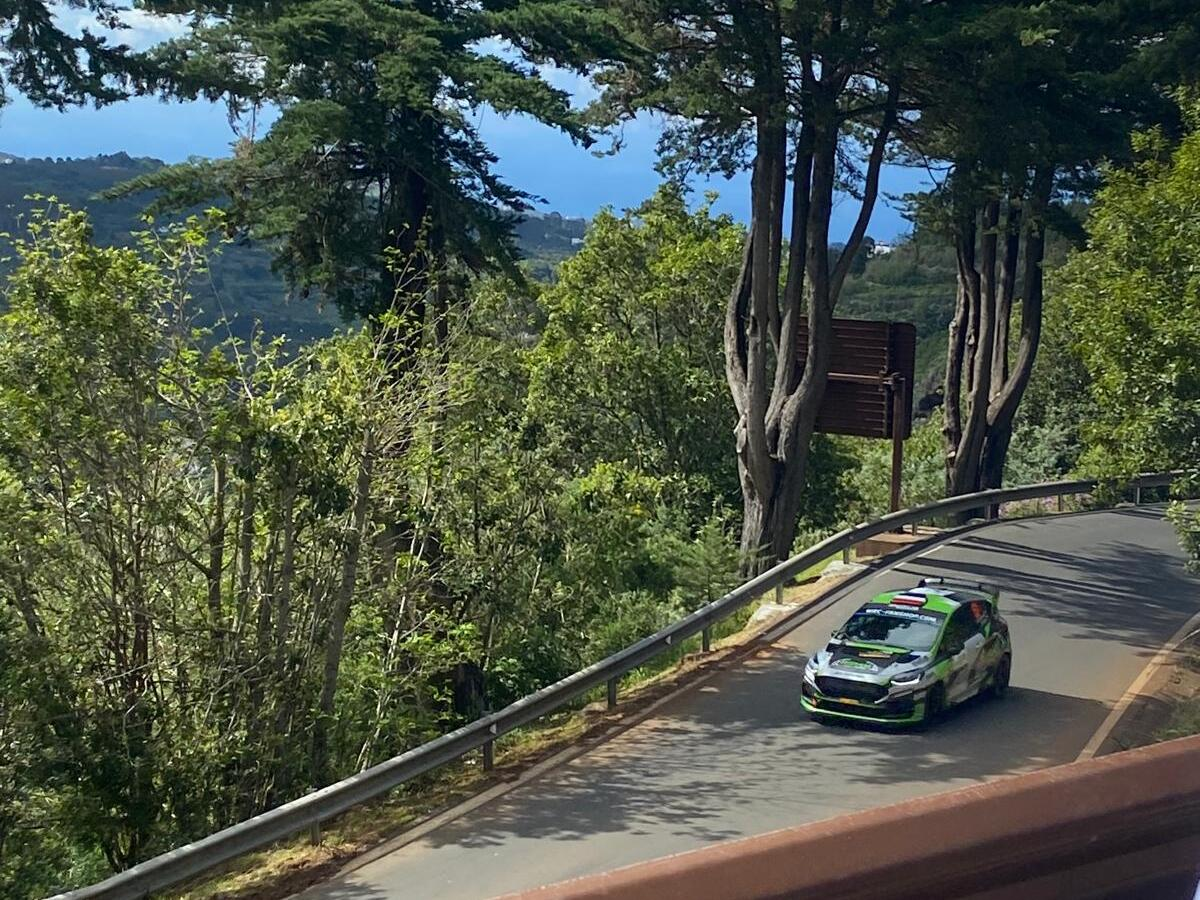
- The rally features routes across Gran Canaria Island.
- Host country: Spain
- Rally base: Las Palmas, Gran Canaria
- Dates run: 23 – 26 April 2026
- Start location: Santa Brígida, Las Palmas
- Finish location: Agüimes, Las Palmas
- Stages: 18 (322.04 km; 200.11 miles)
- Stage surface: Tarmac
- Transport distance: 846.59 km (526.05 miles)
- Overall distance: 1,168.63 km (726.15 miles)

Statistics
- Crews registered: 59
- Crews: 58 at start, 51 at finish

Overall results
- Overall winner: (France) Sébastien Ogier (France) Vincent Landais (Japan) Toyota Gazoo Racing WRT; 2:43:18.9
- Sunday Accumulated leader: (United Kingdom) Elfyn Evans (United Kingdom) Scott Martin (Japan) Toyota Gazoo Racing WRT; 45:11.2
- Power Stage winner: (United Kingdom) Elfyn Evans (United Kingdom) Scott Martin (Japan) Toyota Gazoo Racing WRT; 7:03.9

Support category results
- WRC-2 winner: (France) Yohan Rossel (France) Arnaud Dunand (Italy) Lancia Corse HF; 2:50:43.2
- WRC-3 winner: (Spain) Gil Membrado (Spain) Adrián Pérez; 3:03:28.2

The 2026 Rally Islas Canarias (also known as the Rally Islas Canarias – Rally of Spain 2026) was a motor racing event for rally cars that took place over four days from 23 to 26 April 2026. It marked the fiftieth running of the Rally Islas Canarias, and it was the fifth round of the 2026 World Rally Championship, 2026 WRC2 Championship and 2026 WRC3 Championship. The 2026 event was based in Las Palmas on the island of Gran Canaria, and consisted of eighteen special stages, covering a total competitive distance of 322.04 km (200.11 mi).

Kalle Rovanperä and Jonne Halttunen were the defending rally winners, and Toyota Gazoo Racing WRT, were the defending manufacturer's winners. However, Rovanperä and Halttunen did not defend their titles as Rovanperä moved to the Super Formula Championship. Yohan Rossel and Arnaud Dunand were the defending rally winners in the WRC2 championship. Mattéo Chatillon and Maxence Cornuau were the defending rally winners in the WRC3 championship.

Sébastien Ogier and Vincent Landais won their second rally of the season, and their team, Toyota, successfully defended their titles. Yohan Rossel and Arnaud Dunand were the winners in the WRC2 category. Gil Membrado and Adrián Pérez were the winners in the WRC3 category as well as the junior championship.

== Background ==
=== Entry list ===
The following crews entered into the rally. The event was open to all crews competing in the World Rally Championship, its support categories, the WRC2 Championship, the WRC3 Championship and privateer entries that are not registered to score points in any championship. Prior to the event, ten crews were set to enter under Rally1 regulations, twenty-six Rally2 crews in the WRC2 Championship and seven Rally3 crews in the WRC3 Championship.

Rally1 entries competing in the World Rally Championship
No.	Driver	Co-Driver	Entrant	Car	Championship eligibility	Tyre
1	(France) Sébastien Ogier	(France) Vincent Landais	(Japan) Toyota Gazoo Racing WRT	Toyota GR Yaris Rally1	Driver, Co-driver, Manufacturer	H
5	(Finland) Sami Pajari	(Finland) Marko Salminen	(Japan) Toyota Gazoo Racing WRT2	Toyota GR Yaris Rally1	Driver, Co-driver, Manufacturer, Team	H
6	(Spain) Dani Sordo	(Spain) Cándido Carrera	(South Korea) Hyundai Shell Mobis WRT	Hyundai i20 N Rally1	Driver, Co-driver, Manufacturer	H
11	(Belgium) Thierry Neuville	(Belgium) Martijn Wydaeghe	(South Korea) Hyundai Shell Mobis WRT	Hyundai i20 N Rally1	Driver, Co-driver, Manufacturer	H
16	(France) Adrien Fourmaux	(France) Alexandre Coria	(South Korea) Hyundai Shell Mobis WRT	Hyundai i20 N Rally1	Driver, Co-driver, Manufacturer	H
18	(Japan) Takamoto Katsuta	(Republic of Ireland) Aaron Johnston	(Japan) Toyota Gazoo Racing WRT	Toyota GR Yaris Rally1	Driver, Co-driver	H
33	(United Kingdom) Elfyn Evans	(United Kingdom) Scott Martin	(Japan) Toyota Gazoo Racing WRT	Toyota GR Yaris Rally1	Driver, Co-driver, Manufacturer	H
55	(Republic of Ireland) Josh McErlean	(Republic of Ireland) Eoin Treacy	(United Kingdom) M-Sport Ford WRT	Ford Puma Rally1	Driver, Co-driver, Manufacturer	H
95	(Republic of Ireland) Jon Armstrong	(Republic of Ireland) Shane Byrne	(United Kingdom) M-Sport Ford WRT	Ford Puma Rally1	Driver, Co-driver, Manufacturer	H
99	(Sweden) Oliver Solberg	(United Kingdom) Elliott Edmondson	(Japan) Toyota Gazoo Racing WRT	Toyota GR Yaris Rally1	Driver, Co-driver, Manufacturer	H

Rally2 entries competing in the WRC2 Championship
No.	Driver	Co-Driver	Entrant	Car	Championship eligibility	Tyre
20	(France) Léo Rossel	(France) Guillaume Mercoiret	(France) 2C Junior Team	Citroën C3 Rally2	Challenger Driver, Challenger Co-driver	H
21	(Estonia) Robert Virves	(Estonia) Jakko Viilo	(Germany) Toksport WRT	Škoda Fabia RS Rally2	Team	H
22	(Italy) Roberto Daprà	(Italy) Luca Guglielmetti	(Italy) Roberto Daprà	Škoda Fabia RS Rally2	Challenger Driver, Challenger Co-driver	H
23	(France) Arthur Pelamourges	(France) Bastien Pouget	(France) Arthur Pelamourges	Hyundai i20 N Rally2	Challenger Driver, Challenger Co-driver	H
25	(France) Eric Camilli	(France) Thibault de la Haye	(France) Eric Camilli	Škoda Fabia RS Rally2	Driver, Co-driver	H
26	(Paraguay) Diego Domínguez Jr.	(Spain) Rogelio Peñate	(Paraguay) Diego Domínguez Jr.	Toyota GR Yaris Rally2	Challenger Driver, Challenger Co-driver	H
27	(Bulgaria) Nikolay Gryazin	(Kyrgyzstan) Konstantin Aleksandrov	(Italy) Lancia Corse HF	Lancia Ypsilon Rally2 HF Integrale	Challenger Driver, Challenger Co-driver, Team	H
28	(Italy) Giovanni Trentin	(Italy) Pietro Elia Ometto	(Italy) MT Racing SRL	Škoda Fabia RS Rally2	Challenger Driver, Challenger Co-driver	H
29	(France) Yohan Rossel	(France) Arnaud Dunand	(Italy) Lancia Corse HF	Lancia Ypsilon Rally2 HF Integrale	Driver, Co-driver, Team	H
30	(Paraguay) Andrea Lafarja	(Paraguay) Germán Maune	(Paraguay) Andrea Lafarja	Toyota GR Yaris Rally2	Challenger/Masters Driver, Challenger Co-driver	H
31	(Spain) Alejandro Cachón	(Spain) Borja Rozada	(Spain) Toyota España	Toyota GR Yaris Rally2	Challenger Driver, Challenger Co-driver	H
32	(Spain) Jan Solans	(Spain) Rodrigo Sanjuan de Eusebio	(Spain) PH.Ph	Toyota GR Yaris Rally2	Challenger Driver, Challenger Co-driver	H
34	(Finland) Emil Lindholm	(Brazil) Gabriel Morales	(Germany) Toksport WRT	Škoda Fabia RS Rally2	Driver, Co-driver, Team	H
35	Alexey Lukyanuk (Note: Alexey Lukyanuk is Russian, but he competes as a neutral competitor using the AIN flag as Russian national emblems were banned by the association due to the Russian invasion of Ukraine.)	Yuriy Kulikov (Note: Yuriy Kulikov is Russian, but he competes as a neutral competitor using the AIN flag as Russian national emblems were banned by the association due to the Russian invasion of Ukraine.)	Alexey Lukyanuk	Škoda Fabia RS Rally2	Challenger Driver, Challenger Co-driver	H
36	(Spain) Enrique Cruz	(Spain) Yeray Mújica Eugenio	(Spain) C.D. Seventen	Toyota GR Yaris Rally2	Challenger Driver, Challenger Co-driver	H
37	(Spain) Armide Martín	(Spain) Eduardo González Delgado	(Spain) Auto-Laca Competición	Škoda Fabia R5	Challenger Driver, Challenger Co-driver	H
39	(Sweden) Mille Johansson	(Sweden) Johan Grönvall	(Sweden) Mille Johansson	Škoda Fabia RS Rally2	Challenger Driver, Challenger Co-driver	H
40	(Japan) Yuki Yamamoto	(Republic of Ireland) James Fulton	(Finland) Printsport	Toyota GR Yaris Rally2	Challenger Driver, Co-driver	H
41	(United Kingdom) Philip Allen	(United Kingdom) Craig Drew	(United Kingdom) Philip Allen	Toyota GR Yaris Rally2	Challenger Driver, Challenger Co-driver	H
42	(France) Pablo Sarrazin	(France) Yannick Roche	(France) Pablo Sarrazin	Citroën C3 Rally2	Challenger Driver, Challenger Co-driver	H
43	(Mexico) Alejandro Mauro	(Spain) Ariday Bonilla	(Mexico) Alejandro Mauro	Škoda Fabia RS Rally2	Challenger Driver, Challenger Co-driver	H
44	(Spain) Antonio Forné	(Spain) Axel Coronado	(Spain) Escudería Costa Brava	Škoda Fabia Rally2 evo	Challenger Driver, Challenger Co-driver	H
45	(Spain) Julio Martínez Cazorla	(Spain) Eduardo González Delgado	(Spain) Escudería Drago Rallye	Ford Fiesta R5	Challenger Driver, Challenger Co-driver	H
46	(Spain) Zósimo Hernández	(Spain) Mayte Gutiérrez Febles	(Spain) Escudería Hierro Sur	Citroën C3 Rally2	Challenger Driver, Challenger Co-driver	H
47	(Austria) Johannes Keferböck	(Austria) Ilka Minor	(Austria) Johannes Keferböck	Toyota GR Yaris Rally2	Challenger/Masters Driver, Masters Co-driver	H
48	(France) Adrien Mosca	(France) Julie Amblard	(Finland) Printsport	Toyota GR Yaris Rally2	Challenger Driver, Challenger Co-driver	H
49	(Spain) Carlos Moreno Córdoba	(Spain) Diego Fuentes	(Spain) Automóvil Club de Murcia	Škoda Fabia RS Rally2	Challenger Driver, Challenger Co-driver	H
50	(Mexico) Miguel Granados	(Spain) Marc Martí	(Mexico) Miguel Granados	Škoda Fabia RS Rally2	Challenger/Masters Driver, Masters Co-driver	H
51	(Italy) Maurizio Chiarani	(Italy) Flavio Zanella	(Italy) Maurizio Chiarani	Citroën C3 Rally2	Challenger/Masters Driver, Challenger/Masters Co-driver	H
52	(United States) Filippo Marchino	(United States) Alexander Kihurani	(United States) Filippo Marchino	Citroën C3 Rally2	Challenger Driver, Challenger Co-driver	H

Rally3 entries competing in the WRC3 Championship
No.	Driver	Co-Driver	Entrant	Car	Tyre
53	(Poland) Tymoteusz Abramowski	(Poland) Jakub Wróbel	(Poland) Tymoteusz Abramowski	Ford Fiesta Rally3	H
54	(Spain) Raúl Hernández	(Spain) José Murado	(Spain) Raúl Hernández	Ford Fiesta Rally3	H
56	(France) Ghjuvanni Rossi	(France) Kylian Sarmezan	(France) Ghjuvanni Rossi	Ford Fiesta Rally3	H
57	(Spain) Gil Membrado	(Spain) Adrián Pérez	(Spain) Gil Membrado	Ford Fiesta Rally3	H
58	(Germany) Nicolas Otto Boehringer	(Portugal) Hugo Magalhães	(Germany) Nicolas Otto Boehringer	Ford Fiesta Rally3	H
59	(Spain) Sergio Fernández Guerra	(Spain) Benito Sacramento	(Spain) Escudería Daute-Realejos	Renault Clio Rally3	H
60	(India) Dean Mascarenhas	(India) Gagan Karumbaiah	(India) Dean Mascarenhas	Ford Fiesta Rally3	H

Other major entries
No.	Driver	Co-Driver	Entrant	Car	Tyre
24	(Paraguay) Fabrizio Zaldivar	(Italy) Marcelo Der Ohannesian	(Paraguay) Fabrizio Zaldivar	Škoda Fabia RS Rally2	H
38	(Estonia) Romet Jürgenson	(Estonia) Siim Oja	(United Kingdom) M-Sport Ford WRT	Ford Fiesta Rally2	H

=== Itinerary ===
All dates and times are WEST (UTC+1).

Date	No.	Time span	Stage name	Distance
23 April	—	After 9:01	Santa Brígida [Shakedown]	6.26 km
23 April	SS1	After 17:35	BP Ultimate – Circuito Islas Canarias	2.27 km
24 April		8:15 – 8:30	Service B, Gran Canaria Stadium	—N/a
24 April	SS2	After 9:20	Valleseco – Artenara 1	15.27 km
24 April	SS3	After 10:48	La Aldea – Mogán 1	21.42 km
24 April	SS4	After 12:11	Tejeda – San Mateo 1	26.05 km
24 April		13:16 – 13:46	Regroup, Gran Canaria Stadium	—N/a
24 April		13:46 – 14:16	Service C, Gran Canaria Stadium	—N/a
24 April	SS5	After 15:06	Valleseco – Artenara 2	15.27 km
24 April	SS6	After 16:34	La Aldea – Mogán 2	21.42 km
24 April	SS7	After 17:57	Tejeda – San Mateo 2	26.05 km
24 April		19:12 – 19:57	Flexi service D, Gran Canaria Stadium	—N/a
25 April		6:30 – 6:45	Service E, Gran Canaria Stadium	—N/a
25 April	SS8	After 8:20	Maspalomas 1	13.47 km
25 April	SS9	After 9:35	Arucas – Teror 1	13.74 km
25 April	SS10	After 10:51	Moya – Gáldar 1	28.90 km
25 April		12:15 – 12:45	Regroup, Gran Canaria Stadium	—N/a
25 April		12:45 – 13:15	Service F, Gran Canaria Stadium	—N/a
25 April	SS11	After 14:50	Maspalomas 2	13.47 km
25 April	SS12	After 16:05	Arucas – Teror 2	13.74 km
25 April	SS13	After 17:21	Moya – Gáldar 2	28.90 km
25 April		12:15 – 12:45	Regroup, Avenida José Mesa y López	—N/a
25 April	SS14	After 19:25	BP Ultimate – Las Palmas de Gran Canaria	2.55 km
25 April		20:05 – 20:50	Flexi service G, Gran Canaria Stadium	—N/a
26 April		6:30 – 6:45	Service H, Gran Canaria Stadium	—N/a
26 April	SS15	After 7:35	Ingenio – Valsequillo 1	26.49 km
26 April	SS16	After 9:05	Santa Lucía – Agüimes 1	13.27 km
26 April		9:40 – 10:15	Regroup, Hotel Las Tirajanas	—N/a
26 April	SS17	After 10:50	Ingenio – Valsequillo 2	26.49 km
26 April		12:12 – 12:57	Regroup, Vecindario	—N/a
26 April	SS18	After 13:15	Santa Lucía – Agüimes 2 [Power Stage]	13.15 km
26 April		After 13:35	Podium ceremony, Agüimes	—N/a

== Report ==
=== WRC Rally1 ===
==== Classification ====
Position		No.	Driver	Co-driver	Entrant	Car	Time	Difference	Points			
Event	Class	No.	Driver	Co-driver	Entrant	Car	Time	Difference	Event	Sunday	Stage	Total
1	1	1	Sébastien Ogier	Vincent Landais	Toyota Gazoo Racing WRT	Toyota GR Yaris Rally1	2:43:18.9	0.0	25	4	3	32
2	2	33	Elfyn Evans	Scott Martin	Toyota Gazoo Racing WRT	Toyota GR Yaris Rally1	2:43:38.8	+19.9	17	5	5	27
3	3	5	Sami Pajari	Marko Salminen	Toyota Gazoo Racing WRT2	Toyota GR Yaris Rally1	2:44:59.7	+1:40.8	15	3	2	20
4	4	18	Takamoto Katsuta	Aaron Johnston	Toyota Gazoo Racing WRT	Toyota GR Yaris Rally1	2:45:10.1	+1:51.2	12	2	4	18
5	5	16	Adrien Fourmaux	Alexandre Coria	Hyundai Shell Mobis WRT	Hyundai i20 N Rally1	2:46:48.4	+3:29.5	10	0	0	10
6	6	11	Thierry Neuville	Martijn Wydaeghe	Hyundai Shell Mobis WRT	Hyundai i20 N Rally1	2:46:59.9	+3:41.0	8	1	1	10
7	7	20	Hayden Paddon	John Kennard	Hyundai Shell Mobis WRT	Hyundai i20 N Rally1	2:47:16.6	+3:57.7	6	0	0	6
8	8	55	Josh McErlean	Eoin Treacy	M-Sport Ford WRT	Ford Puma Rally1	2:49:04.3	+5:45.4	4	0	0	4
11	9	95	Jon Armstrong	Shane Byrne	M-Sport Ford WRT	Ford Puma Rally1	2:51:11.1	+7:52.2	0	0	0	0
Retired SS17		99	Oliver Solberg	Elliott Edmondson	Toyota Gazoo Racing WRT	Toyota GR Yaris Rally1	Accident damage		0	0	0	0

==== Special stages ====
Stage	Winners	Car	Time	Class leaders
SD	Solberg / Edmondson	Toyota GR Yaris Rally1	4:06.9	—N/a
SS1	Katsuta / Johnston	Toyota GR Yaris Rally1	1:54.2	Katsuta / Johnston
SS2	Ogier / Landais	Toyota GR Yaris Rally1	7:38.3	Ogier / Landais
SS3	Stage cancelled			
SS4	Ogier / Landais	Toyota GR Yaris Rally1	12:24.5	Ogier / Landais
SS5	Solberg / Edmondson	Toyota GR Yaris Rally1	7:38.3	Ogier / Landais
SS6	Ogier / Landais	Toyota GR Yaris Rally1	10:35.0	Ogier / Landais
SS7	Ogier / Landais	Toyota GR Yaris Rally1	12:21.4	Ogier / Landais
SS8	Pajari / Salminen	Toyota GR Yaris Rally1	1:53.5	Ogier / Landais
SS8	Katsuta / Johnston	Toyota GR Yaris Rally1	1:53.5	Ogier / Landais
SS9	Evans / Martin	Toyota GR Yaris Rally1	6:42.3	Ogier / Landais
SS10	Evans / Martin	Toyota GR Yaris Rally1	8:07.4	Ogier / Landais
SS11	Solberg / Edmondson	Toyota GR Yaris Rally1	17:14.7	Ogier / Landais
SS12	Evans / Martin	Toyota GR Yaris Rally1	6:39.8	Ogier / Landais
SS13	Ogier / Landais	Toyota GR Yaris Rally1	7:43.8	Ogier / Landais
SS13	Solberg / Edmondson	Toyota GR Yaris Rally1	7:43.8	Ogier / Landais
SS14	Solberg / Edmondson	Toyota GR Yaris Rally1	17:01.9	Ogier / Landais
SS15	Solberg / Edmondson	Toyota GR Yaris Rally1	15:56.8	Ogier / Landais
SS16	Solberg / Edmondson	Toyota GR Yaris Rally1	7:03.8	Ogier / Landais
SS17	Ogier / Landais	Toyota GR Yaris Rally1	15:02.7	Ogier / Landais
SS18	Evans / Martin	Toyota GR Yaris Rally1	7:03.9	Ogier / Landais

==== Championship standings ====
Drivers' Standings
Move	Pos.	Driver	Points
1	1	Elfyn Evans	101
1	2	Takamoto Katsuta	99
1	3	Sami Pajari	72
1	4	Oliver Solberg	68
	5	Adrien Fourmaux	59

Co-drivers' Standings
Move	Pos.	Driver	Points
1	1	Scott Martin	101
1	2	Aaron Johnston	99
1	3	Marko Salminen	72
1	4	Elliott Edmondson	68
	5	Alexandre Coria	59

Manufacturers' Standings
Move	Pos.	Driver	Points
	1	Toyota Gazoo Racing WRT	265
	2	Hyundai Shell Mobis WRT	167
	3	Toyota Gazoo Racing WRT2	75
	4	M-Sport Ford WRT	63

=== WRC2 Rally2 ===
==== Classification ====
Position		No.	Driver	Co-driver	Entrant	Car	Time	Difference	Points	
Event	Class	No.	Driver	Co-driver	Entrant	Car	Time	Difference	Class	Event
9	1	29	Yohan Rossel	Arnaud Dunand	Lancia Corsa HF	Lancia Ypsilon Rally2 HF Integrale	2:50:43.2	0.0	25	2
10	2	31	Alejandro Cachón	Borja Rozada	Toyota España	Toyota GR Yaris Rally2	2:51:08.3	+25.1	17	1
12	3	25	Eric Camilli	Thibault de la Haye	Eric Camilli	Škoda Fabia RS Rally2	2:51:34.4	+51.2	15	0
13	4	22	Roberto Daprà	Luca Guglielmetti	Roberto Daprà	Škoda Fabia RS Rally2	2:51:43.8	+1:00.6	12	0
14	5	20	Léo Rossel	Guillaume Mercoiret	2C Junior Team	Citroën C3 Rally2	2:51:45.5	+1:02.3	10	0
15	6	27	Nikolay Gryazin	Konstantin Aleksandrov	Lancia Corsa HF	Lancia Ypsilon Rally2 HF Integrale	2:51:52.7	+1:09.5	8	0
16	7	32	Jan Solans	Rodrigo Sanjuan de Eusebio	PH.Ph	Toyota GR Yaris Rally2	2:52:36.2	+1:53.0	6	0
17	8	34	Emil Lindholm	Gabriel Morales	Toksport WRT	Škoda Fabia RS Rally2	2:52:48.8	+2:05.6	4	0
18	9	36	Enrique Cruz	Yeray Mújica Eugenio	C.D. Seventen	Toyota GR Yaris Rally2	2:53:24.8	+2:41.6	2	0
19	10	39	Mille Johansson	Johan Grönvall	Mille Johansson	Škoda Fabia RS Rally2	2:53:27.6	+2:44.4	1	0
20	11	42	Pablo Sarrazin	Yannick Roche	Pablo Sarrazin	Citroën C3 Rally2	2:53:41.9	+2:58.7	0	0
21	12	26	Diego Domínguez Jr.	Rogelio Peñate	Diego Domínguez Jr.	Toyota GR Yaris Rally2	2:53:53.8	+3:10.6	0	0
22	13	23	Arthur Pelamourges	Bastien Pouget	Arthur Pelamourges	Hyundai i20 N Rally2	2:54:28.6	+3:45.4	0	0
25	14	28	Giovanni Trentin	Pietro Elia Ometto	MT Racing SRL	Škoda Fabia RS Rally2	2:55:07.6	+4:24.4	0	0
26	15	40	Yuki Yamamoto	James Fulton	Printsport	Toyota GR Yaris Rally2	2:55:24.5	+4:41.3	0	0
27	16	37	Armide Martín	Eduardo González Delgado	Auto-Laca Competición	Škoda Fabia R5	2:56:34.5	+5:51.3	0	0
29	17	49	Carlos Moreno Córdoba	Diego Fuentes	Automóvil Club de Murcia	Škoda Fabia RS Rally2	3:02:31.4	+11:48.2	0	0
30	18	50	Miguel Granados	Marc Martí	Miguel Granados	Škoda Fabia RS Rally2	3:02:56.6	+12:13.4	0	0
33	19	47	Johannes Keferböck	Ilka Minor	Johannes Keferböck	Toyota GR Yaris Rally2	3:04:10.0	+13:26.8	0	0
35	20	52	Filippo Marchino	Alexander Kihurani	Filippo Marchino	Citroën C3 Rally2	3:07:45.4	+17:02.2	0	0
37	21	35	Alexey Lukyanuk	Yuriy Kulikov	Alexey Lukyanuk	Škoda Fabia RS Rally2	3:13:04.9	+22:21.7	0	0
42	22	46	Zósimo Hernández	Mayte Gutiérrez Febles	Escudería Hierro Sur	Citroën C3 Rally2	3:21:01.5	+30:18.3	0	0
43	23	30	Andrea Lafarja	Germán Maune	Andrea Lafarja	Toyota GR Yaris Rally2	3:28:45.9	+38:02.7	0	0
47	24	48	Adrien Mosca	Julie Amblard	Printsport	Toyota GR Yaris Rally2	3:38:05.0	+47:21.8	0	0
Retired SS17		41	Philip Allen	Craig Drew	Philip Allen	Toyota GR Yaris Rally2	Accident		0	0
Retired SS15		44	Antonio Forné	Axel Coronado	Escudería Costa Brava	Škoda Fabia Rally2 evo	Withdrawn		0	0
Retired SS15		51	Maurizio Chiarani	Flavio Zanella	Maurizio Chiarani	Citroën C3 Rally2	Withdrawn		0	0
Retired SS4		43	Alejandro Mauro	Ariday Bonilla	Alejandro Mauro	Škoda Fabia RS Rally2	Accident		0	0
Retired SS2		45	Julio Martínez Cazorla	Eduardo González Delgado	Escudería Drago Rallye	Ford Fiesta R5	Mechanical		0	0

==== Special stages ====
Overall
Stage	Winners	Car	Time	Class leaders
SD	Daprà / Guglielmetti	Škoda Fabia RS Rally2	4:18.3	—N/a
SS1	Daprà / Guglielmetti	Škoda Fabia RS Rally2	1:55.0	Daprà / Guglielmetti
SS2	Y. Rossel / Dunand	Lancia Ypsilon Rally2 HF Integrale	7:55.6	Y. Rossel / Dunand
SS3	Stage cancelled			
SS4	Y. Rossel / Dunand	Lancia Ypsilon Rally2 HF Integrale	12:52.7	Y. Rossel / Dunand
SS5	Y. Rossel / Dunand	Lancia Ypsilon Rally2 HF Integrale	7:55.6	Y. Rossel / Dunand
SS6	Y. Rossel / Dunand	Lancia Ypsilon Rally2 HF Integrale	10:59.0	Y. Rossel / Dunand
SS7	Y. Rossel / Dunand	Lancia Ypsilon Rally2 HF Integrale	12:50.3	Y. Rossel / Dunand
SS8	Trentin / Ometto	Škoda Fabia RS Rally2	1:56.1	Y. Rossel / Dunand
SS8	Lindholm / Morales	Škoda Fabia RS Rally2	1:56.1	Y. Rossel / Dunand
SS9	Lindholm / Morales	Škoda Fabia RS Rally2	7:01.5	Y. Rossel / Dunand
SS10	Gryazin / Aleksandrov	Lancia Ypsilon Rally2 HF Integrale	8:27.4	Y. Rossel / Dunand
SS11	Y. Rossel / Dunand	Lancia Ypsilon Rally2 HF Integrale	17:56.5	Y. Rossel / Dunand
SS12	Cachón / Rozada	Toyota GR Yaris Rally2	6:59.1	Y. Rossel / Dunand
SS13	L. Rossel / Mercoiret	Citroën C3 Rally2	8:02.5	Y. Rossel / Dunand
SS14	L. Rossel / Mercoiret	Citroën C3 Rally2	17:44.3	Y. Rossel / Dunand
SS15	L. Rossel / Mercoiret	Citroën C3 Rally2	16:36.2	Y. Rossel / Dunand
SS16	Lukyanuk / Kulikov	Škoda Fabia RS Rally2	7:24.2	Y. Rossel / Dunand
SS17	Lukyanuk / Kulikov	Škoda Fabia RS Rally2	15:48.5	Y. Rossel / Dunand
SS18	Johansson / Grönvall	Škoda Fabia RS Rally2	7:27.2	Y. Rossel / Dunand

Challenger
Stage	Winners	Car	Time	Class leaders
SD	Daprà / Guglielmetti	Škoda Fabia RS Rally2	4:18.3	—N/a
SS1	Daprà / Guglielmetti	Škoda Fabia RS Rally2	1:55.0	Daprà / Guglielmetti
SS2	L. Rossel / Mercoiret	Citroën C3 Rally2	7:56.4	L. Rossel / Mercoiret
SS3	Stage cancelled			
SS4	Cachón / Rozada	Toyota GR Yaris Rally2	12:56.5	L. Rossel / Mercoiret
SS5	L. Rossel / Mercoiret	Citroën C3 Rally2	7:58.4	L. Rossel / Mercoiret
SS6	Cachón / Rozada	Toyota GR Yaris Rally2	11:01.7	Cachón / Rozada
SS7	Cachón / Rozada	Toyota GR Yaris Rally2	12:54.0	Cachón / Rozada
SS8	Trentin / Ometto	Škoda Fabia RS Rally2	1:56.1	Cachón / Rozada
SS9	Lukyanuk / Kulikov	Škoda Fabia RS Rally2	7:04.3	Cachón / Rozada
SS10	Gryazin / Aleksandrov	Lancia Ypsilon Rally2 HF Integrale	8:27.4	Cachón / Rozada
SS11	Cachón / Rozada	Toyota GR Yaris Rally2	18:00.8	Cachón / Rozada
SS12	Cachón / Rozada	Toyota GR Yaris Rally2	6:59.1	Cachón / Rozada
SS13	L. Rossel / Mercoiret	Citroën C3 Rally2	8:02.5	Cachón / Rozada
SS14	L. Rossel / Mercoiret	Citroën C3 Rally2	17:44.3	Cachón / Rozada
SS15	Cachón / Rozada	Toyota GR Yaris Rally2	16:40.2	Cachón / Rozada
SS16	Lukyanuk / Kulikov	Škoda Fabia RS Rally2	7:24.2	Cachón / Rozada
SS17	Lukyanuk / Kulikov	Škoda Fabia RS Rally2	15:48.5	Cachón / Rozada
SS18	Johansson / Grönvall	Škoda Fabia RS Rally2	7:27.2	Cachón / Rozada

==== Championship standings ====
Drivers' Standings
Move	Pos.	Driver	Points
2	1	Yohan Rossel	52
2	2	Léo Rossel	52
2	3	Roberto Daprà	25
2	4	Roope Korhonen	35
1	5	Nikolay Gryazin	25

Co-drivers' Standings
Move	Pos.	Driver	Points
2	1	Arnaud Dunand	52
1	2	Guillaume Mercoiret	52
2	3	Luca Guglielmetti	37
2	4	Anssi Viinikka	35
1	5	Konstantin Aleksandrov	31

Manufacturers' Standings
Move	Pos.	Driver	Points
	1	Lancia Corse HF	126
	2	Toksport WRT	94
	3	M-Sport Ford WRT	45

Challenger Drivers' Standings
Move	Pos.	Driver	Points
	1	Léo Rossel	65
1	2	Roberto Daprà	44
8	3	Alejandro Cachón	40
	4	Nikolay Gryazin	39
3	5	Roope Korhonen	37

Challenger Co-drivers' Standings
Move	Pos.	Driver	Points
	1	Guillaume Mercoiret	67
1	2	Luca Guglielmetti	54
1	3	Konstantin Aleksandrov	42
2	4	Anssi Viinikka	40
2	5	Jakko Viilo	25

=== WRC3 Rally3 ===
==== Classification ====
Position		No.	Driver	Co-driver	Entrant	Car	Time	Difference	Points
Event	Class	No.	Driver	Co-driver	Entrant	Car	Time	Difference	Points
31	1	57	Gil Membrado	Adrián Pérez	Gil Membrado	Ford Fiesta Rally3	3:03:28.2	0.0	25
32	2	53	Tymoteusz Abramowski	Jakub Wróbel	Tymoteusz Abramowski	Ford Fiesta Rally3	3:03:41.9	+13.7	17
34	3	56	Ghjuvanni Rossi	Kylian Sarmezan	Ghjuvanni Rossi	Ford Fiesta Rally3	3:05:46.0	+2:17.8	15
36	4	58	Nicolas Otto Boehringer	Hugo Magalhães	Nicolas Otto Boehringer	Ford Fiesta Rally3	3:08:38.7	+5:10.5	12
41	5	59	Sergio Fernández Guerra	Benito Sacramento	Escudería Daute-Realejos	Renault Clio Rally3	3:16:22.0	+12:53.8	10
45	6	54	Raúl Hernández	José Murado	Raúl Hernández	Ford Fiesta Rally3	3:34:56.3	+31:28.1	8
48	7	60	Dean Mascarenhas	Gagan Karumbaiah	Dean Mascarenhas	Ford Fiesta Rally3	3:41:50.6	+38:22.4	6

==== Special stages ====
Stage	Winners	Car	Time	Class leaders
SD	Hernández / Murado	Ford Fiesta Rally3	4:35.8	—N/a
SS1	Abramowski / Wróbel	Ford Fiesta Rally3	2:04.0	Abramowski / Wróbel
SS2	Membrado / Pérez	Ford Fiesta Rally3	8:28.7	Membrado / Pérez
SS3	Stage cancelled			
SS4	Membrado / Pérez	Ford Fiesta Rally3	13:46.9	Membrado / Pérez
SS5	Membrado / Pérez	Ford Fiesta Rally3	8:27.6	Membrado / Pérez
SS6	Membrado / Pérez	Ford Fiesta Rally3	11:43.7	Membrado / Pérez
SS7	Membrado / Pérez	Ford Fiesta Rally3	13:39.4	Membrado / Pérez
SS8	Membrado / Pérez	Ford Fiesta Rally3	2:03.6	Membrado / Pérez
SS9	Stage cancelled			
SS10	Abramowski / Wróbel	Ford Fiesta Rally3	8:54.7	Membrado / Pérez
SS11	Membrado / Pérez	Ford Fiesta Rally3	19:05.5	Membrado / Pérez
SS12	Abramowski / Wróbel	Ford Fiesta Rally3	7:32.8	Membrado / Pérez
SS13	Membrado / Pérez	Ford Fiesta Rally3	8:37.1	Membrado / Pérez
SS14	Abramowski / Wróbel	Ford Fiesta Rally3	18:58.8	Abramowski / Wróbel
SS15	Hernández / Murado	Ford Fiesta Rally3	17:44.0	Membrado / Pérez
SS16	Abramowski / Wróbel	Ford Fiesta Rally3	7:52.9	Membrado / Pérez
SS17	Stage cancelled			
SS18	Abramowski / Wróbel	Ford Fiesta Rally3	7:57.1	Membrado / Pérez

==== Championship standings ====
Drivers' Standings
Move	Pos.	Driver	Points
4	1	Gil Membrado	54
1	2	Matteo Fontana	50
3	3	Raúl Hernández	35
3	4	Tymoteusz Abramowski	34
3	5	Eric Royère	33

Co-drivers' Standings
Move	Pos.	Driver	Points
4	1	Adrián Pérez	54
1	2	Alessandro Arnaboldi	50
3	3	José Murado	35
3	4	Jakub Wróbel	34
3	5	Alexis Grenier	33

== Notes ==
Previous rally: 2026 Croatia Rally	2026 FIA World Rally Championship	Next rally: 2026 Rally de Portugal
Previous rally: 2025 Rally Islas Canarias	2026 Rally Islas Canarias	Next rally: 2027 Rally Islas Canarias
