= Jon Armstrong (rally driver) =

Rally driver from Northern Ireland

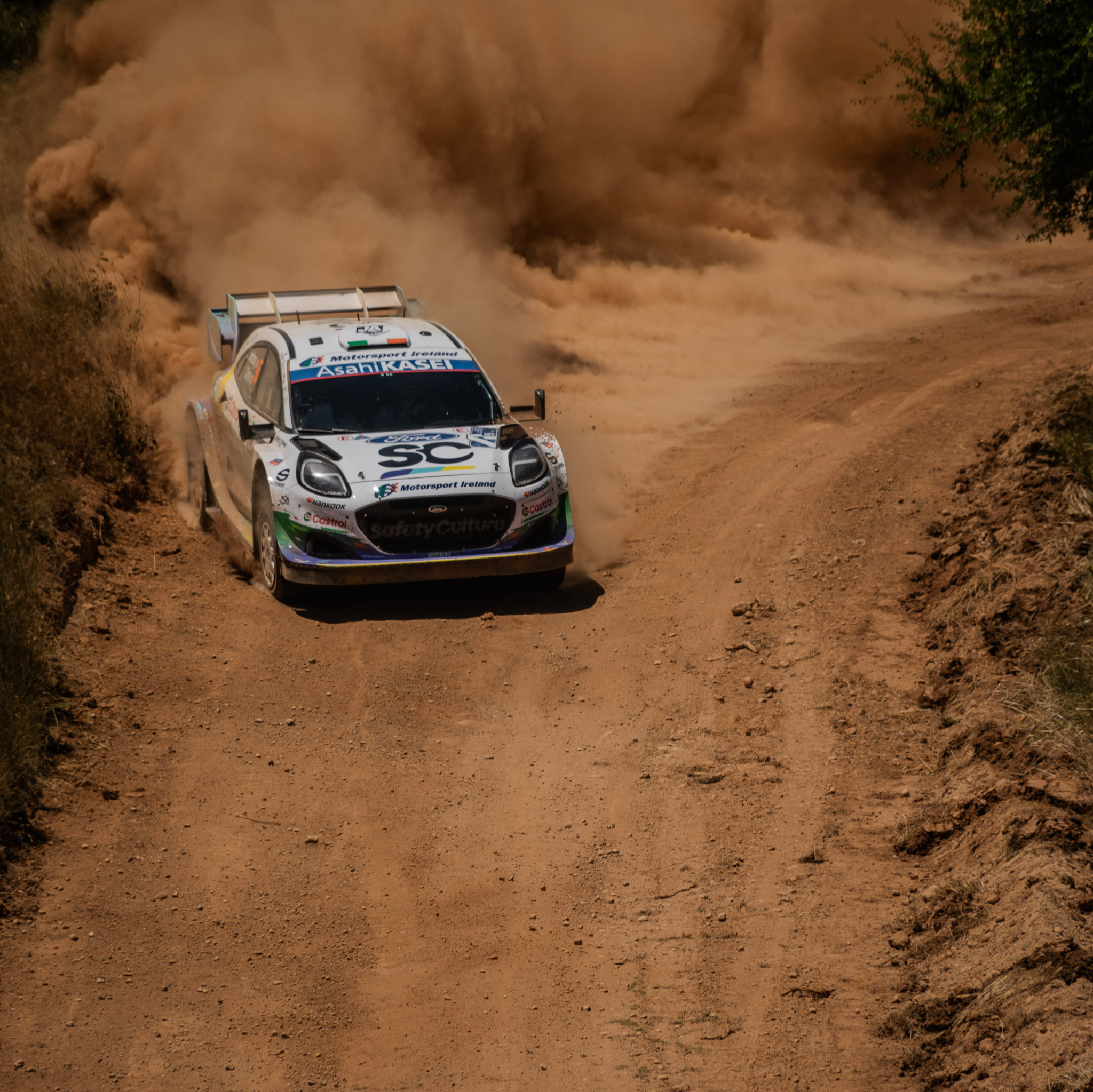
- Ford Puma Rally1 of Armstrong at the 2026 Acropolis Rally.

Personal information
- Nationality: (United Kingdom) British (Republic of Ireland) Irish
- Full name: Jon Edward Ernest Armstrong
- Born: 18 December 1994 (age 31); Kesh, County Fermanagh, Northern Ireland

World Rally Championship record
- Years active: 2026–present
- Co-driver: (Republic of Ireland) Shane Byrne
- Teams: M-Sport Ford
- Rallies: 13
- Championships: 0
- Rally wins: 0
- Podiums: 0
- Stage wins: 1
- Total points: 22
- First rally: 2026 Monte Carlo Rally
- Last rally: 2026 Rally Italia Sardegna
- Last updated on: 22/10/2026.

Jon Edward Ernest Armstrong (born 11 December 1994) is a Northern Irish rally driver who currently competes in the World Rally Championship for M-Sport Ford WRT. His current co-driver is County Donegal native, Shane Byrne, who he started working with in 2025. This change in co-drivers was due to Eoin Treacy leaving Armstrong, for his future M-Sport Ford teammate, Josh McErlean.

== Biography ==
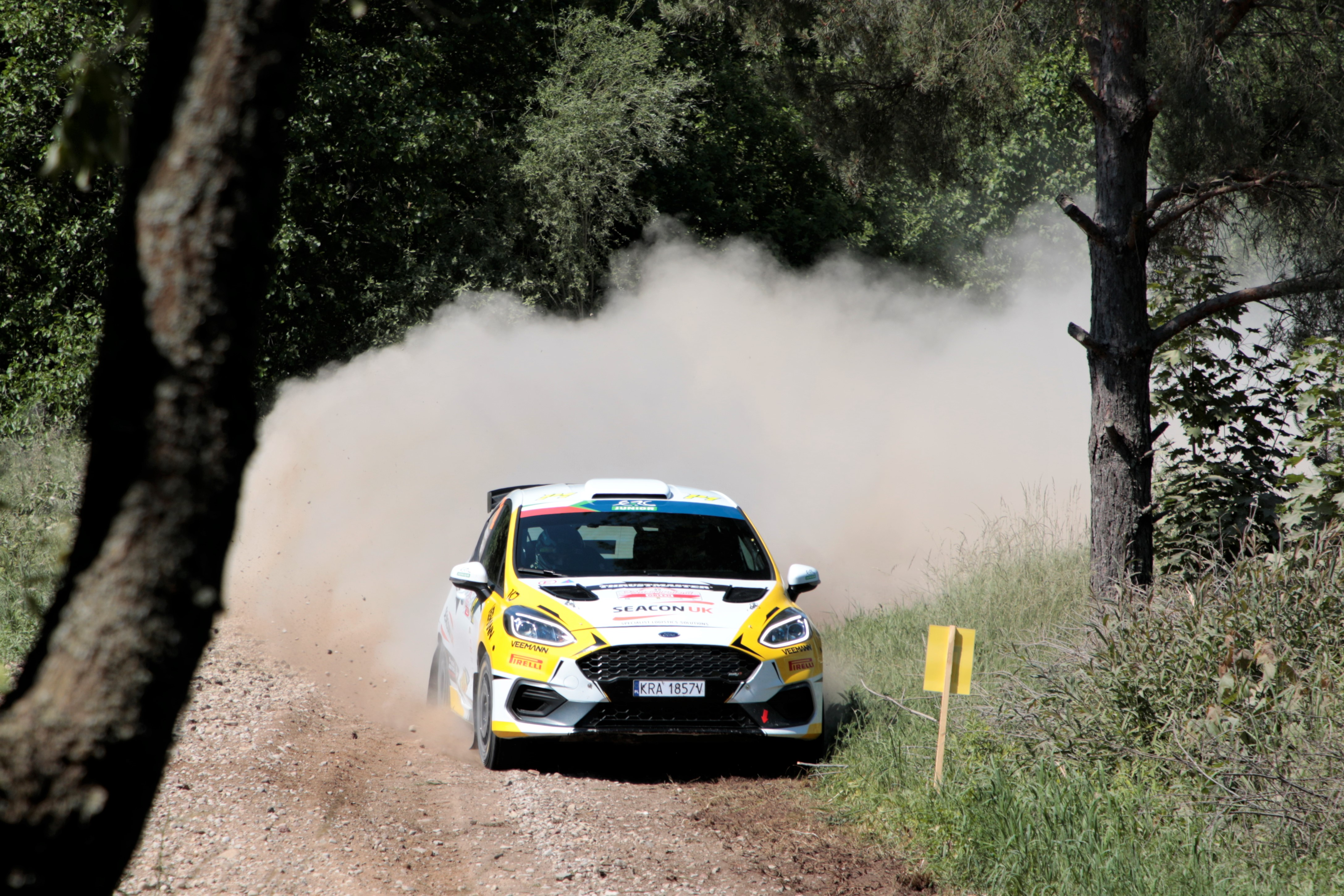
Armstrong driving a Ford Fiesta Rally3 at the Rally Poland.

Armstrong was born in County Fermanagh. He began rallying at the age of 13 and won the World Rally Esports Championship in 2018. He was also the runner-up of the 2021 Junior WRC Championship. After years competing in the European Rally Championship, he would step up to the top tier of the World Rally Championship with Shane Byrne, driving a works Rally1 car for M-Sport Ford WRT in 2026.

Outside rallying, Armstrong was one of the game designers of EA Sports WRC by Codemasters and EA Sports.

Armstrong is in a relationship with Colin McRae's daughter, Hollie McRae. she notably let him drive her late father Colin McRae`s title winning Subaru Impreza 555

== Rally results ==
=== WRC results ===
Year	Entrant	Car	1	2	3	4	5	6	7	8	9	10	11	12	13	14	WDC	Points
2015	Jon Armstrong	Ford Fiesta R2	MON	SWE	MEX	ARG	POR	ITA	POL	FIN	GER	AUS	FRA	ESP; 44	GBR		NC	0
2016	Jon Armstrong	Ford Fiesta R2	MON	SWE	MEX	ARG	POR; 39	ITA	POL; 30	FIN; Ret	GER; 41	CHN; C	FRA	ESP; 42	GBR	AUS	NC	0
2017	Drive Dmack	Ford Fiesta R5	MON	SWE	MEX	FRA	ARG	POR	ITA	POL	FIN	GER; 32	ESP; 23	GBR	AUS		NC	0
2020	Jon Armstrong	Ford Fiesta R2T	MON	SWE; Ret	MEX	EST	TUR	ITA	MNZ								NC	0
2021	Jon Armstrong	Ford Fiesta Rally4	MON	ARC	CRO; 18	POR; Ret	ITA	KEN	EST; 22	BEL; 20	GRE	FIN	ESP; 43	MNZ			NC	0
2022	Jon Armstrong	Ford Fiesta Rally3	MON	SWE; 14	CRO; 51	POR; 32	ITA	KEN	EST; 18	FIN	BEL	GRE; 20	NZL	ESP	JPN		NC	0
2026	M-Sport Ford WRT	Ford Puma Rally1	MON; Ret	SWE; 8	KEN; 15	CRO; 32	ESP; 11	POR; Ret	JPN; 8	GRE; 20	EST; 9	FIN; 46	PAR; Ret	CHL; 33	ITA; 7		12th	22
