= Ford Puma Rally1 =

Ford Rally1 rally car

Ford Puma Hybrid Rally1
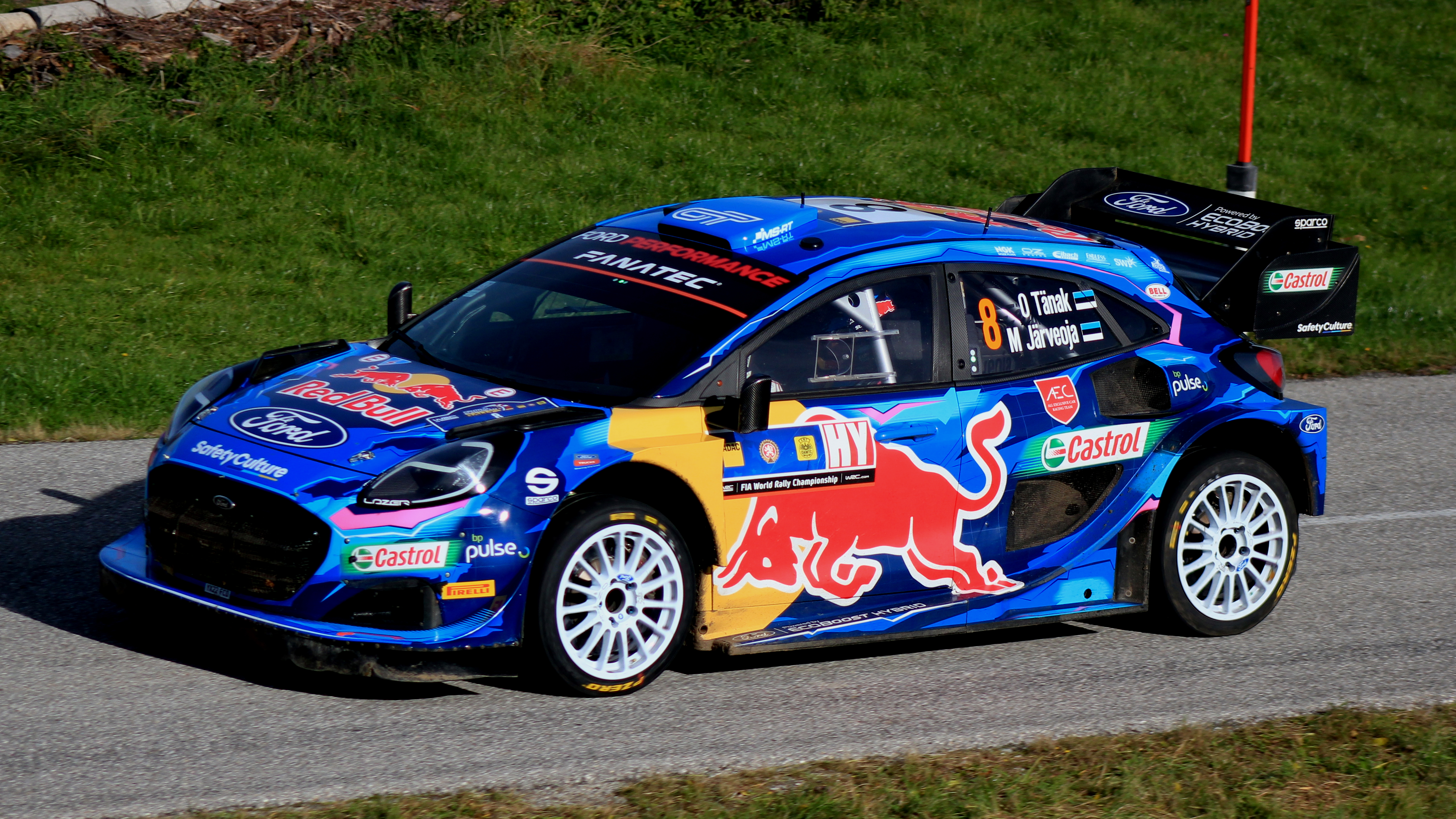
- Ott Tänak at the 2023 Central European Rally
- Category: Rally1
- Constructor: M-Sport
- Designer: Chris Williams
- Predecessor: Ford Fiesta WRC

Technical specifications
- Chassis: Tubular spaceframe with FIA multi-point roll cage
- Wheelbase: 2,600 mm
- Engine: Ford EcoBoost 1.6 L (1,600 cc; 98 cu in) I4 386 PS turbo direct injection with a 100 kW electric motor and 3.9 kWh plug in hybrid battery
- Transmission: Five-speed semi-automatic transmission Mechanical front and rear limited-slip differentials
- Weight: 1,260 kg
- Brakes: 300-370 mm brake discs with four-piston callipers
- Tyres: 2022–2024: Pirelli P Zero (for tarmac); Pirelli Cinturato (for wet tarmac); Pirelli Sottozero (for ice/snow); Pirelli Scorpion (for gravel, clay and rest of dirt-type surfaces); 2025–2026: Hankook
- Clutch: Double-plate, sintered clutch

Competition history (WRC)
- Notable entrants: (United Kingdom) M-Sport Ford WRT
- Notable drivers: (Republic of Ireland) Craig Breen; (France) Adrien Fourmaux; (United Kingdom) Gus Greensmith; (France) Sébastien Loeb; (Estonia) Ott Tänak; (Luxembourg) Grégoire Munster; (Latvia) Mārtiņš Sesks; (Republic of Ireland) Josh McErlean; (Republic of Ireland) Jon Armstrong
- Debut: (Monaco) 2022 Monte Carlo Rally
- First win: (Monaco) 2022 Monte Carlo Rally
- Last win: 2023 Rally Chile
- Last event: (Italy) 2026 Rally Italia Sardegna
Races	Wins	Podiums	Titles
41	3	12	0
- Constructors' Championships: 0
- Drivers' Championships: 0

The Ford Puma Rally1 is a Rally1 car built by the M-Sport Ford World Rally Team that was used in the World Rally Championship in 2022. It is based upon the road car version of Ford Puma crossover, and was developed for the purpose of replacing the Ford Fiesta WRC, which competed between 2017 and 2021. The car was revealed at the 2021 Goodwood Festival of Speed.

== World Rally Championship results ==
=== WRC victories ===
Year	No.	Event	Surface	Driver	Co-driver	Entrant	Ref.
2022	1	(Monaco) 2022 Monte Carlo Rally	Mixed	(France) Sébastien Loeb	(France) Isabelle Galmiche	(United Kingdom) M-Sport Ford World Rally Team	
2023	2	2023 Rally Sweden	Snow	(Estonia) Ott Tänak	(Estonia) Martin Järveoja	(United Kingdom) M-Sport Ford World Rally Team	
2023	3	2023 Rally Chile	Gravel	(Estonia) Ott Tänak	(Estonia) Martin Järveoja	(United Kingdom) M-Sport Ford World Rally Team	

== Rally results ==
=== World Rally Championship results ===
Year	Entrant	Driver	Rounds														Points	WCM pos.
Year	Entrant	Driver	1	2	3	4	5	6	7	8	9	10	11	12	13	14	Points	WCM pos.
2022	M-Sport Ford WRT	(Republic of Ireland) Craig Breen	MON; 3	SWE; 36	CRO; 4	POR; 8	ITA; 2	KEN; 6	EST; 30	FIN; 32	BEL; 63	GRE; 5	NZL; 19	ESP; 9	JPN; 24		257	3rd
2022	M-Sport Ford WRT	(France) Adrien Fourmaux	MON; Ret	SWE; Ret	CRO; Ret	POR; 9	ITA; Ret	KEN; 13	EST; 7	FIN; 18	BEL; Ret	GRE; WD	NZL; WD	ESP; 8	JPN; WD		257	3rd
2022	M-Sport Ford WRT	(United Kingdom) Gus Greensmith	MON; 5	SWE; 5	CRO; 15	POR; 19	ITA; 7	KEN; 14	EST; Ret	FIN; 7	BEL; 19	GRE; 29	NZL; Ret	ESP; Ret	JPN; 6		257	3rd
2022	M-Sport Ford WRT	(France) Sébastien Loeb	MON; 1	SWE	CRO	POR; Ret	ITA	KEN; 8	EST	FIN	BEL	GRE; Ret	NZL	ESP	JPN		257	3rd
2022	M-Sport Ford WRT	(Italy) Lorenzo Bertelli	MON	SWE; WD	CRO	POR	ITA	KEN	EST	FIN	BEL	GRE	NZL; 7	ESP	JPN		—N/a	—N/a
2022	M-Sport Ford WRT	(France) Pierre-Louis Loubet	MON	SWE	CRO; 47	POR; 7	ITA; 4	KEN	EST; Ret	FIN; Ret	BEL	GRE; 4	NZL	ESP; 10	JPN		—N/a	—N/a
2022	M-Sport Ford WRT	(Greece) Jourdan Serderidis	MON	SWE	CRO	POR	ITA	KEN; 7	EST	FIN	BEL	GRE; Ret	NZL	ESP; 28	JPN; WD		—N/a	—N/a
2022	M-Sport Ford WRT	(Finland) Jari Huttunen	MON	SWE	CRO	POR	ITA	KEN	EST	FIN; 9	BEL	GRE	NZL	ESP	JPN		—N/a	—N/a
2023	M-Sport Ford WRT	(France) Pierre-Louis Loubet	MON; Ret	SWE; 6	MEX; 26	CRO; 7	POR; 32	ITA; Ret	KEN; 7	EST; 6	FIN; 45	GRE; Ret	CHI; Ret	EUR; 10	JPN		287	3rd
2023	M-Sport Ford WRT	(Estonia) Ott Tänak	MON; 5	SWE; 1	MEX; 9	CRO; 2	POR; 4	ITA; 35	KEN; 6	EST; 8	FIN; Ret	GRE; 4	CHI; 1	EUR; 3	JPN; 6		287	3rd
2023	M-Sport Ford WRT	(Greece) Jourdan Serderidis	MON; 24	SWE	MEX; 25	CRO	POR	ITA	KEN; Ret	EST	FIN	GRE; 17	CHI	EUR	JPN		—N/a	—N/a
2023	M-Sport Ford WRT	(Luxembourg) Grégoire Munster	MON	SWE	MEX	CRO	POR	ITA	KEN	EST	FIN	GRE	CHI; 13	EUR; 7	JPN		—N/a	—N/a
2023	M-Sport Ford WRT	(Chile) Alberto Heller	MON	SWE	MEX	CRO	POR	ITA	KEN	EST	FIN	GRE	CHI; 15	EUR	JPN		—N/a	—N/a
2023	M-Sport Ford WRT	(France) Adrien Fourmaux	MON	SWE	MEX	CRO	POR	ITA	KEN	EST	FIN	GRE	CHI	EUR	JPN; Ret		—N/a	—N/a
2024	M-Sport Ford WRT	(France) Adrien Fourmaux	MON; 5	SWE; 3	KEN; 3	CRO; 17	POR; 4	ITA; 14	POL; 3	LAT; 4	FIN; 3	GRE; 21	CHL; 5	EUR; 32	JPN; 3		295	3rd
2024	M-Sport Ford WRT	(Luxembourg) Grégoire Munster	MON; 20	SWE; 23	KEN; 15	CRO; 7	POR; Ret	ITA; 5	POL; 7	LAT; 9	FIN; 49	GRE; Ret	CHL; 7	EUR; 5	JPN; 5		295	3rd
2024	M-Sport Ford WRT	(Greece) Jourdan Serderidis	MON	SWE	KEN; 9	CRO	POR	ITA	POL	LAT	FIN	GRE; 14	CHL	EUR; 20	JPN		—N/a	—N/a
2024	M-Sport Ford WRT	(Latvia) Mārtiņš Sesks	MON	SWE	KEN	CRO	POR	ITA	POL; 5	LAT; 7	FIN	GRE	CHL; 24	EUR	JPN		—N/a	—N/a
2025	M-Sport Ford WRT	(Luxembourg) Grégoire Munster	MON; Ret	SWE; 8	KEN; 5	ESP; 11	POR; 9	ITA; 32	GRE; Ret	EST; 10	FIN; 9	PAR; 39	CHL; 8	EUR; 27	JPN; 5	SAU; 8	205	3rd
2025	M-Sport Ford WRT	(Republic of Ireland) Josh McErlean	MON; 7	SWE; 46	KEN; 10	ESP; Ret	POR; 8	ITA; 34	GRE; 12	EST; 9	FIN; 7	PAR; 29	CHL; 37	EUR; 7	JPN; Ret	SAU; 9	205	3rd
2025	M-Sport Ford WRT	(Latvia) Mārtiņš Sesks	MON	SWE; 6	KEN	ESP	POR; 15	ITA; Ret	GRE; 15	EST; 8	FIN; 8	PAR	CHL	EUR	JPN	SAU; Ret	–	–
2025	M-Sport Ford WRT	(Greece) Jourdan Serderidis	MON	SWE; 33	KEN; 8	ESP	POR	ITA; 25	GRE; Ret	EST	FIN	PAR	CHL	EUR	JPN	SAU	–	–
2025	M-Sport Ford WRT	(Portugal) Diogo Salvi	MON	SWE	KEN	ESP	POR; 31	ITA	GRE	EST	FIN	PAR	CHL	EUR	JPN	SAU	–	–
2025	M-Sport Ford WRT	(Chile) Alberto Heller	MON	SWE	KEN	ESP	POR	ITA	GRE	EST	FIN	PAR	CHL; 38	EUR	JPN	SAU	–	–
2025	M-Sport Ford WRT	(Qatar) Nasser Al-Attiyah	MON	SWE	KEN	ESP	POR	ITA	GRE	EST	FIN	PAR	CHL	EUR	JPN	SAU; 15	–	–
2026	M-Sport Ford WRT	(Republic of Ireland) Josh McErlean	MON; Ret	SWE; 9	KEN; Ret	CRO; 15	ESP; 8	POR; 18	JPN; 10	GRE; 4	EST; 43	FIN; 7	PAR; 6	CHL; 7	ITA; 22	SAU; C	168	4th
2026	M-Sport Ford WRT	(Republic of Ireland) Jon Armstrong	MON; Ret	SWE; 8	KEN; 15	CRO; 32	ESP; 11	POR; Ret	JPN; 8	GRE; 20	EST; 9	FIN; 46	PAR; Ret	CHL; 33	ITA; 7	SAU; C	168	4th
2026	M-Sport Ford WRT	(Luxembourg) Grégoire Munster	MON; Ret	SWE	KEN	CRO	ESP	POR	JPN	GRE	EST	FIN	PAR	CHL	ITA	SAU; C	–	–
2026	M-Sport Ford WRT	(Latvia) Mārtiņš Sesks	MON	SWE; 35	KEN	CRO	ESP	POR; 9	JPN	GRE; 8	EST; 7	FIN; 42	PAR	CHL	ITA; 18	SAU; C	–	–
2026	M-Sport Ford WRT	(Greece) Jourdan Serderidis	MON	SWE	KEN	CRO	ESP	POR	JPN	GRE; 32	EST	FIN	PAR	CHL	ITA	SAU; C	–	–

* Season still in progress.
