= Eoin Treacy =

Irish rally co-driver

Personal information
- Born: 28 October 1998 (age 28)

World Rally Championship record
- Years active: 2023, 2025–present
- Driver: Josh McErlean
- Teams: M-Sport Ford WRT
- Rallies: 14
- Championships: 0
- Rally wins: 0
- Podiums: 0
- Stage wins: 0
- Total points: 26
- First rally: 2023 Rally Mexico
- Last rally: 2025 Central European Rally

Eoin Treacy (born 28 October 1998) is an Irish rally co-driver.

== Biography ==
Having debuted as a co-driver on the international scene in 2022, Treacy completed a meteoric rise from a Ford Fiesta Rally4 car in the 2022 British Rally Championship through a European Rally Championship placement alongside Jon Armstrong in a Ford Fiesta Rally2 car in 2024. At the end of 2024, Treacy was announced as the co-driver of Josh McErlean to compete for M-Sport Ford in the 2025 World Rally Championship. This would also be his WRC top level debut.

== Rally results ==
=== WRC results ===
Year	Entrant	Car	1	2	3	4	5	6	7	8	9	10	11	12	13	14	Pos.	Points
2023	John Coyne	Ford Fiesta Rally2	MON	SWE	MEX; 24	CRO	POR	ITA	KEN	EST							NC	0
2023	John Coyne	Hyundai i20 N Rally2									FIN; 38	GRE	CHL	EUR	JPN		NC	0
2025	M-Sport Ford WRT	Ford Puma Rally1	MON; 7	SWE; 46	KEN; 10	ESP; Ret	POR; 8	ITA; 34	GRE; 12	EST; 9	FIN; 7	PAR; 29	CHL; 37	EUR; 7	JPN; Ret	SAU; 9	11th	28
2026	M-Sport Ford WRT	Ford Puma Rally1	MON; Ret	SWE; 9	KEN; Ret	CRO; 15	ESP; 8	POR; 18	JPN; 10	GRE; 6	EST; 43	FIN; 7	PAR; 6	CHL; 7	ITA; 22		9th	35

* Season still in progress.

=== ERC results ===
Year	Entrant	Car	1	2	3	4	5	6	7	8	Pos.	Points
2024	Jon Armstrong	Ford Fiesta Rally2	HUN; 8	CAN; 8	SWE; Ret	EST; 6	ITA; 17	CZE; 26	GBR; 6	POL; 2	5th	88

* Season still in progress.
