= 2025 Central European Rally =

3rd edition of the Central European Rally

2025 Central European Rally Central European Rally 2025
Round 12 of 14 in the 2025 World Rally Championship
| ← Previous event | Next event → |
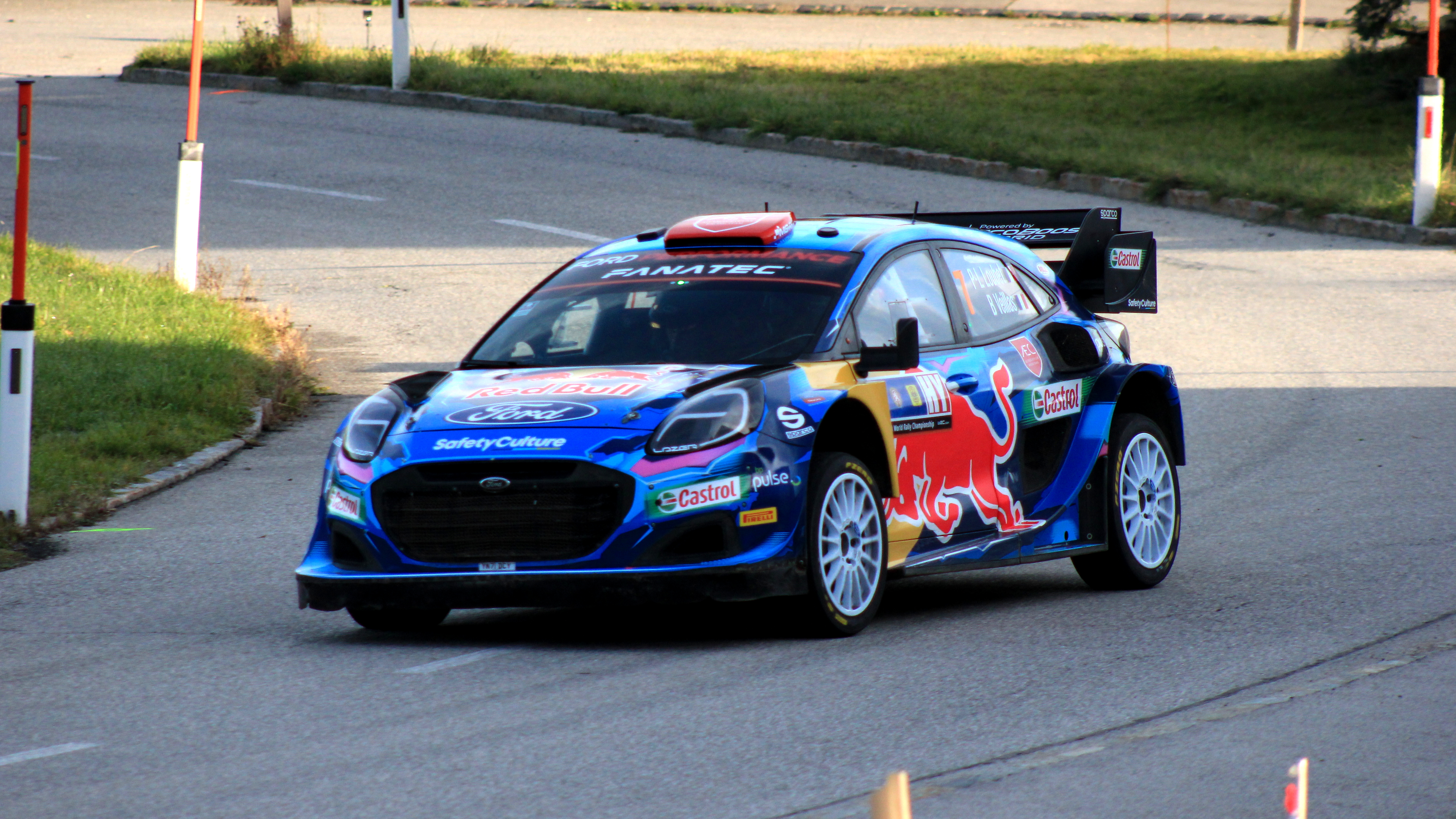
- The Central European Rally features routes across three nations.
- Host country: Austria; Czech Republic; Germany
- Rally base: Passau, Bavaria, Germany
- Dates run: 16 – 19 October 2025
- Start location: Passau, Bavaria, Germany
- Finish location: Peilstein im Mühlviertel, Rohrbach District, Austria
- Stages: 18 (306.08 km; 190.19 miles)
- Stage surface: Tarmac
- Transport distance: 1,138.61 km (707.50 miles)
- Overall distance: 1,444.69 km (897.69 miles)

Statistics
- Crews registered: 47
- Crews: 46 at start, 36 at finish

Overall results
- Overall winner: (Finland) Kalle Rovanperä (Finland) Jonne Halttunen (Japan) Toyota Gazoo Racing WRT; 2:36:20.1
- Sunday Accumulated leader: (France) Sébastien Ogier (France) Vincent Landais (Japan) Toyota Gazoo Racing WRT; 39:56.4
- Power Stage winner: (France) Sébastien Ogier (France) Vincent Landais (Japan) Toyota Gazoo Racing WRT; 13:58.2

Support category results
- WRC-2 winner: (Czech Republic) Jan Černý (Czech Republic) Ondřej Krajča; 2:47:11.2
- WRC-3 winner: (Australia) Taylor Gill (Australia) Daniel Brkic; FIA Rally Star; 2:54:29.4
- J-WRC winner: (Sweden) Mille Johansson (Sweden) Johan Grönvall; 2:54:27.8

The 2025 Central European Rally (also known as the Central Europe Rally 2025) was a motor racing event for rally cars held over four days from 16 to 19 October 2025. It marked the third running of the Central European Rally and the twelfth round of the 2025 World Rally Championship, 2025 WRC2 Championship and 2025 WRC3 Championship. The event was the final round of the 2025 Junior WRC Championship. The 2025 event was based in Passau, Bavaria in Germany and contested over eighteen special stages, covering a total competitive distance of 306.08 km (190.19 mi).

Ott Tänak and Martin Järveoja were the defending rally winners, and their team, Hyundai Shell Mobis WRT, were the defending manufacturers' winners. Nikolay Gryazin and Konstantin Aleksandrov were the defending rally winners in the WRC2 category. Mattéo Chatillon and Maxence Cornuau were the defending rally winners in the WRC3 category.

Kalle Rovanperä and Jonne Halttunen won the rally, and their team, Toyota Gazoo Racing WRT, were the manufacturer's winner and became the 2025 manufacturer's champion. Jan Černý and Ondřej Krajča were the winners in the WRC2 category, and secured their category titles. Taylor Gill and Daniel Brkic were the winners in the WRC3 category. Mille Johansson and Johan Grönvall were the winners in the junior category and became the 2025 Junior WRC champion.

== Background ==
=== Entry list ===
The following crews were entered into the rally. The event was opened to crews competing in the World Rally Championship, its support categories, the WRC2 Championship, the WRC3 Championship and privateer entries that were not registered to score points in any championship. Ten were entered under Rally1 regulations, as were nine Rally2 crews in the WRC2 Championship and nine Rally3 crew in the WRC3 Championship. A total of eight crews participated in the Junior World Rally Championship.

Rally1 entries competing in the World Rally Championship
| No. | Driver | Co-Driver | Entrant | Car | Championship eligibility | Tyre |
|---|---|---|---|---|---|---|
| 1 | (Belgium) Thierry Neuville | (Belgium) Martijn Wydaeghe | (South Korea) Hyundai Shell Mobis WRT | Hyundai i20 N Rally1 | Driver, Co-driver, Manufacturer | H |
| 5 | (Finland) Sami Pajari | (Finland) Marko Salminen | (Japan) Toyota Gazoo Racing WRT2 | Toyota GR Yaris Rally1 | Driver, Co-driver, Manufacturer, Team | H |
| 8 | (Estonia) Ott Tänak | (Estonia) Martin Järveoja | (South Korea) Hyundai Shell Mobis WRT | Hyundai i20 N Rally1 | Driver, Co-driver | H |
| 13 | (Luxembourg) Grégoire Munster | (Belgium) Louis Louka | (United Kingdom) M-Sport Ford WRT | Ford Puma Rally1 | Driver, Co-driver, Manufacturer | H |
| 16 | (France) Adrien Fourmaux | (France) Alexandre Coria | (South Korea) Hyundai Shell Mobis WRT | Hyundai i20 N Rally1 | Driver, Co-driver, Manufacturer | H |
| 17 | (France) Sébastien Ogier | (France) Vincent Landais | (Japan) Toyota Gazoo Racing WRT | Toyota GR Yaris Rally1 | Driver, Co-driver, Manufacturer | H |
| 18 | (Japan) Takamoto Katsuta | (Republic of Ireland) Aaron Johnston | (Japan) Toyota Gazoo Racing WRT | Toyota GR Yaris Rally1 | Driver, Co-driver | H |
| 33 | (United Kingdom) Elfyn Evans | (United Kingdom) Scott Martin | (Japan) Toyota Gazoo Racing WRT | Toyota GR Yaris Rally1 | Driver, Co-driver, Manufacturer | H |
| 55 | (Republic of Ireland) Josh McErlean | (Republic of Ireland) Eoin Treacy | (United Kingdom) M-Sport Ford WRT | Ford Puma Rally1 | Driver, Co-driver, Manufacturer | H |
| 69 | (Finland) Kalle Rovanperä | (Finland) Jonne Halttunen | (Japan) Toyota Gazoo Racing WRT | Toyota GR Yaris Rally1 | Driver, Co-driver, Manufacturer | H |

Rally2 entries competing in the WRC2 Championship
| No. | Driver | Co-Driver | Entrant | Car | Championship eligibility | Tyre |
|---|---|---|---|---|---|---|
| 21 | (Italy) Roberto Daprà | (Italy) Luca Guglielmetti | (Italy) Roberto Daprà | Škoda Fabia RS Rally2 | Challenger Driver, Challenger Co-driver | H |
| 22 | (Bulgaria) Nikolay Gryazin | (Kyrgyzstan) Konstantin Aleksandrov | (Germany) Toksport WRT | Škoda Fabia RS Rally2 | Challenger Driver, Challenger Co-driver | H |
| 23 | (Spain) Alejandro Cachón | (Spain) Borja Rozada | (Spain) Toyota España | Toyota GR Yaris Rally2 | Challenger Driver, Challenger Co-driver | H |
| 24 | (Czech Republic) Jan Černý | (Czech Republic) Ondřej Krajča | (Czech Republic) Jan Černý | Citroën C3 Rally2 | Challenger Driver, Challenger Co-driver | H |
| 25 | (France) Léo Rossel | (France) Guillaume Mercoiret | (France) PH Sport | Citroën C3 Rally2 | Challenger Driver, Challenger Co-driver | H |
| 26 | (Spain) Diego Ruiloba | (Spain) Ángel Vela | (Spain) Diego Ruiloba | Citroën C3 Rally2 | Challenger Driver, Challenger Co-driver | H |
| 27 | (Czech Republic) Filip Mareš | (Czech Republic) Radovan Bucha | (Czech Republic) Filip Mareš | Toyota GR Yaris Rally2 | Challenger Driver, Challenger Co-driver | H |
| 28 | (Germany) Fabio Schwarz | (Germany) Pascal Raabe | (Germany) Armin Schwarz Driving Experience | Toyota GR Yaris Rally2 | Challenger Driver, Challenger Co-driver | H |
| 29 | (Republic of Ireland) Eamonn Boland | (Republic of Ireland) Michael Joseph Morrissey | (Republic of Ireland) Eamonn Boland | Ford Fiesta Rally2 | Challenger/Masters Driver, Challenger/Masters Co-driver | H |

Rally3 entries competing in the WRC3 Championship and/or the Junior World Rally Championship
| No. | Driver | Co-Driver | Entrant | Car | Class/Championship eligibility | Tyre |
|---|---|---|---|---|---|---|
| 30 | (Croatia) Slaven Šekuljica | (Croatia) Marko Šivak | (Croatia) Slaven Šekuljica | Ford Fiesta Rally3 | WRC3 | H |
| 31 | (France) Tom Pellerey | (France) Hervé Faucher | (France) Tom Pellerey | Renault Clio Rally3 | WRC3 | H |
| 32 | (Australia) Taylor Gill | (Australia) Daniel Brkic | FIA Rally Star | Ford Fiesta Rally3 | WRC3, Junior WRC | H |
| 34 | (Sweden) Mille Johansson | (Sweden) Johan Grönvall | (Sweden) Mille Johansson | Ford Fiesta Rally3 | Junior WRC | H |
| 35 | (Turkey) Ali Türkkan | (Turkey) Oytun Albayrak | (Turkey) Castrol Ford Team Türkiye | Ford Fiesta Rally3 | WRC3, Junior WRC | H |
| 36 | (Republic of Ireland) Eamonn Kelly | (Republic of Ireland) Conor Mohan | (Republic of Ireland) Motorsport Ireland Rally Academy | Ford Fiesta Rally3 | Junior WRC | H |
| 37 | (Turkey) Kerem Kazaz | (France) Corentin Silvestre | (Turkey) Team Petrol Ofisi | Ford Fiesta Rally3 | WRC3, Junior WRC | H |
| 38 | (Paraguay) Diego Dominguez Jr. | (Spain) Rogelio Peñate | (Paraguay) Diego Dominguez Jr. | Ford Fiesta Rally3 | WRC3, Junior WRC | H |
| 39 | (South Africa) Max Smart | (New Zealand) Malcolm Read | FIA Rally Star | Ford Fiesta Rally3 | WRC3, Junior WRC | H |
| 40 | (Germany) Claire Schönborn | (Germany) Michael Wenzel | WRC Young Driver Program | Ford Fiesta Rally3 | WRC3, Junior WRC | H |

Other major entries
| No. | Driver | Co-Driver | Entrant | Car | Tyre |
|---|---|---|---|---|---|
| 20 | (Sweden) Oliver Solberg | (United Kingdom) Elliott Edmondson | (Finland) Printsport | Toyota GR Yaris Rally2 | H |

=== Itinerary ===
All dates and times are CEST (UTC+2).

| Date | No. | Time span | Stage name | Distance |
|---|---|---|---|---|
| 16 October | — | After 9:01 | (Germany) Shakedown [Shakedown] | 4.57 km |
| 16 October | | After 13:55 | (Germany) Opening ceremony, Passau | —N/a |
| 16 October | SS1 | After 14:30 | (Germany) Golf und Therme 1 | 12.83 km |
| 16 October | | 14:55 – 17:37 | (Germany) Regroup, Bad Griesbach | —N/a |
| 16 October | SS2 | After 18:05 | (Germany) Golf und Therme 2 | 12.83 km |
| 16 October | | 19:10 – 19:55 | (Germany) Flexi service A, Passau | —N/a |
| 17 October | | 7:11 – 7:26 | (Germany) Service B, Passau | —N/a |
| 17 October | SS3 | After 8:30 | (Germany) Granit und Wald 1 | 10.86 km |
| 17 October | SS4 | After 9:20 | (Austria) Böhmerwald 1 | 15.27 km |
| 17 October | SS5 | After 11:25 | (Czech Republic) Col de Jan 1 | 23.37 km |
| 17 October | | 13:40 – 13:55 | (Czech Republic) Tyre fitting zone, Kaplice | —N/a |
| 17 October | SS6 | After 14:45 | (Czech Republic) Col de Jan 2 | 23.37 km |
| 17 October | SS7 | After 17:20 | (Austria) Böhmerwald 2 | 15.27 km |
| 17 October | SS8 | After 18:15 | (Germany) Granit und Wald 2 | 10.86 km |
| 17 October | | 19:25 – 20:10 | (Germany) Flexi service C, Passau | —N/a |
| 18 October | | 7:00 – 7:15 | (Germany) Service D, Passau | —N/a |
| 18 October | SS9 | After 8:15 | (Germany) Made in FRG 1 | 14.30 km |
| 18 October | SS10 | After 10:35 | (Czech Republic) Keply 1 | 21.95 km |
| 18 October | SS11 | After 11:35 | (Czech Republic) Klatovy 1 | 15.57 km |
| 18 October | | 12:15 – 12:45 | (Czech Republic) Regroup, Klatovy | —N/a |
| 18 October | | 12:50 – 13:05 | (Czech Republic) Tyre fitting zone, Klatovy | —N/a |
| 18 October | SS12 | After 14:05 | (Czech Republic) Keply 2 | 21.95 km |
| 18 October | SS13 | After 15:05 | (Czech Republic) Klatovy 2 | 15.57 km |
| 18 October | SS14 | After 18:25 | (Germany) Made in FRG 2 | 14.30 km |
| 18 October | | 19:45 – 20:30 | (Germany) Flexi service E, Passau | —N/a |
| 19 October | | 7:00 – 7:15 | (Germany) Service F, Passau | —N/a |
| 19 October | SS15 | After 8:25 | (Germany) / (Austria) Beyond Borders 1 | 12.37 km |
| 19 October | SS16 | After 10:05 | (Austria) Mühltal 1 | 26.52 km |
| 19 October | SS17 | After 11:10 | (Germany) / (Austria) Beyond Borders 2 | 12.37 km |
| 19 October | | 11:52 – 12:32 | (Austria) Regroup, Rohrbach | —N/a |
| 19 October | SS18 | After 13:15 | (Austria) Mühltal 2 [Power Stage] | 26.52 km |
| 19 October | | After 16:30 | (Germany) Podium ceremony, Passau | —N/a |

== Report ==
=== WRC Rally1 ===
==== Classification ====
| Position | | No. | Driver | Co-driver | Entrant | Car | Time | Difference | Points | | | |
| Event | Class | No. | Driver | Co-driver | Entrant | Car | Time | Difference | Event | Sunday | Stage | Total |
|---|---|---|---|---|---|---|---|---|---|---|---|---|
| 1 | 1 | 69 | Kalle Rovanperä | Jonne Halttunen | Toyota Gazoo Racing WRT | Toyota GR Yaris Rally1 | 2:36:20.1 | 0.0 | 25 | 3 | 3 | 31 |
| 2 | 2 | 33 | Elfyn Evans | Scott Martin | Toyota Gazoo Racing WRT | Toyota GR Yaris Rally1 | 2:37:03.8 | +43.7 | 17 | 4 | 4 | 25 |
| 3 | 3 | 10 | Ott Tänak | Martin Järveoja | Hyundai Shell Mobis WRT | Hyundai i20 N Rally1 | 2:37:09.4 | +49.3 | 15 | 1 | 0 | 16 |
| 4 | 4 | 18 | Takamoto Katsuta | Aaron Johnston | Toyota Gazoo Racing WRT | Toyota GR Yaris Rally1 | 2:37:26.9 | +1:06.8 | 12 | 2 | 2 | 16 |
| 5 | 5 | 16 | Adrien Fourmaux | Alexandre Coria | Hyundai Shell Mobis WRT | Hyundai i20 N Rally1 | 2:38:24.7 | +2:04.6 | 10 | 0 | 0 | 10 |
| 6 | 6 | 5 | Sami Pajari | Marko Salminen | Toyota Gazoo Racing WRT2 | Toyota GR Yaris Rally1 | 2:38:34.0 | +2:13.9 | 8 | 0 | 1 | 9 |
| 7 | 7 | 55 | Josh McErlean | Eoin Treacy | M-Sport Ford WRT | Ford Puma Rally1 | 2:42:08.9 | +5:48.8 | 6 | 0 | 0 | 6 |
| 27 | 8 | 13 | Grégoire Munster | Louis Louka | M-Sport Ford WRT | Ford Puma Rally1 | 3:19:08.5 | +42:48.4 | 0 | 0 | 0 | 0 |
| 29 | 9 | 17 | Sébastien Ogier | Vincent Landais | Toyota Gazoo Racing WRT | Toyota GR Yaris Rally1 | 3:26:01.0 | +49:40.9 | 0 | 5 | 5 | 10 |
| Retired SS15 | | 1 | Thierry Neuville | Martijn Wydaeghe | Hyundai Shell Mobis WRT | Hyundai i20 N Rally1 | Accident | | 0 | 0 | 0 | 0 |

==== Special stages ====
| Stage | Winners | Car | Time | Class leaders |
|---|---|---|---|---|
| SD | Neuville / Wydaeghe | Hyundai i20 N Rally1 | 2:15.5 | —N/a |
| SS1 | Ogier / Landais | Toyota GR Yaris Rally1 | 6:24.5 | Ogier / Landais |
| SS2 | Rovanperä / Halttunen | Toyota GR Yaris Rally1 | 6:23.8 | Ogier / Landais |
| SS3 | Neuville / Wydaeghe | Hyundai i20 N Rally1 | 5:30.9 | Ogier / Landais |
| SS4 | Rovanperä / Halttunen | Toyota GR Yaris Rally1 | 7:36.3 | Ogier / Landais |
| SS5 | Ogier / Landais | Toyota GR Yaris Rally1 | 12:12.1 | Ogier / Landais |
| SS6 | Rovanperä / Halttunen | Toyota GR Yaris Rally1 | 12:10.5 | Ogier / Landais |
| SS7 | Rovanperä / Halttunen | Toyota GR Yaris Rally1 | 7:33.2 | Ogier / Landais |
| SS8 | Evans / Martin | Toyota GR Yaris Rally1 | 5:30.9 | Ogier / Landais |
| SS9 | Rovanperä / Halttunen | Toyota GR Yaris Rally1 | 7:17.1 | Rovanperä / Halttunen |
| SS10 | Rovanperä / Halttunen | Toyota GR Yaris Rally1 | 11:17.4 | Rovanperä / Halttunen |
| SS11 | Katsuta / Johnston | Toyota GR Yaris Rally1 | 7:55.7 | Rovanperä / Halttunen |
| SS12 | Tänak / Järveoja | Hyundai i20 N Rally1 | 11:03.6 | Rovanperä / Halttunen |
| SS13 | Katsuta / Johnston | Toyota GR Yaris Rally1 | 7:47.5 | Rovanperä / Halttunen |
| SS14 | Neuville / Wydaeghe | Hyundai i20 N Rally1 | 7:12.2 | Rovanperä / Halttunen |
| SS15 | stage cancelled | | | |
| SS16 | Ogier / Landais | Toyota GR Yaris Rally1 | 14:05.7 | Rovanperä / Halttunen |
| SS17 | Ogier / Landais | Toyota GR Yaris Rally1 | 5:55.0 | Rovanperä / Halttunen |
| SS18 | Ogier / Landais | Toyota GR Yaris Rally1 | 13:58.2 | Rovanperä / Halttunen |

==== Championship standings ====
- **Bold text** indicates 2025 World Champions.

Drivers' Standings
| Move | Pos. | Driver | Points |
|---|---|---|---|
| 1 | 1 | Elfyn Evans | 247 |
| 1 | 2 | Sébastien Ogier | 234 |
| | 3 | Kalle Rovanperä | 234 |
| | 4 | Ott Tänak | 197 |
| | 5 | Thierry Neuville | 166 |

Co-drivers' Standings
| Move | Pos. | Driver | Points |
|---|---|---|---|
| 1 | 1 | Scott Martin | 247 |
| 1 | 2 | Vincent Landais | 234 |
| 1 | 3 | Jonne Halttunen | 234 |
| | 4 | Martin Järveoja | 197 |
| | 5 | Martijn Wydaeghe | 166 |

Manufacturers' Standings
| Move | Pos. | Driver | Points |
|---|---|---|---|
| | 1 | **Toyota Gazoo Racing WRT** | 632 |
| | 2 | Hyundai Shell Mobis WRT | 464 |
| | 3 | M-Sport Ford WRT | 176 |
| | 4 | Toyota Gazoo Racing WRT2 | 127 |

=== WRC2 Rally2 ===
==== Classification ====
| Position | | No. | Driver | Co-driver | Entrant | Car | Time | Difference | Points | |
| Event | Class | No. | Driver | Co-driver | Entrant | Car | Time | Difference | Class | Event |
|---|---|---|---|---|---|---|---|---|---|---|
| 9 | 1 | 24 | Jan Černý | Ondřej Krajča | Jan Černý | Citroën C3 Rally2 | 2:47:11.2 | 0.0 | 25 | 2 |
| 10 | 2 | 27 | Filip Mareš | Radovan Bucha | Filip Mareš | Toyota GR Yaris Rally2 | 2:47:41.3 | +30.1 | 17 | 1 |
| 11 | 3 | 21 | Roberto Daprà | Luca Guglielmetti | Roberto Daprà | Škoda Fabia RS Rally2 | 2:50:11.5 | +3:00.3 | 15 | 0 |
| 20 | 4 | 29 | Eamonn Boland | Michael Joseph Morrissey | Eamonn Boland | Ford Fiesta Rally2 | 3:08:56.3 | +21:45.1 | 12 | 0 |
| 25 | 5 | 22 | Nikolay Gryazin | Konstantin Aleksandrov | Toksport WRT | Škoda Fabia RS Rally2 | 3:17:10.5 | +29:59.3 | 10 | 0 |
| 34 | 6 | 28 | Fabio Schwarz | Pascal Raabe | Armin Schwarz Driving Experience | Toyota GR Yaris Rally2 | 3:31:39.4 | +44:28.2 | 8 | 0 |
| Retired SS18 | | 26 | Diego Ruiloba | Ángel Vela | Diego Ruiloba | Citroën C3 Rally2 | Accident | | 0 | 0 |
| Retired SS14 | | 23 | Alejandro Cachón | Borja Rozada | Toyota España | Toyota GR Yaris Rally2 | Rear suspension | | 0 | 0 |
| Retired SS14 | | 25 | Léo Rossel | Guillaume Mercoiret | PH Sport | Citroën C3 Rally2 | Electrical | | 0 | 0 |

==== Special stages ====
Overall
| Stage | Winners | Car | Time | Class leaders |
|---|---|---|---|---|
| SD | Cachón / Rozada | Toyota GR Yaris Rally2 | 2:23.8 | —N/a |
| SS1 | Cachón / Rozada | Toyota GR Yaris Rally2 | 6:45.4 | Cachón / Rozada |
| SS2 | Cachón / Rozada | Toyota GR Yaris Rally2 | 6:46.3 | Cachón / Rozada |
| SS3 | Cachón / Rozada | Toyota GR Yaris Rally2 | 5:51.6 | Cachón / Rozada |
| SS4 | Cachón / Rozada | Toyota GR Yaris Rally2 | 7:57.3 | Cachón / Rozada |
| SS5 | Mareš / Bucha | Toyota GR Yaris Rally2 | 13:09.9 | Cachón / Rozada |
| SS6 | Cachón / Rozada | Toyota GR Yaris Rally2 | 12:58.3 | Cachón / Rozada |
| SS7 | Gryazin / Aleksandrov | Škoda Fabia RS Rally2 | 7:58.9 | Cachón / Rozada |
| SS8 | Rossel / Mercoiret | Citroën C3 Rally2 | 5:51.2 | Cachón / Rozada |
| SS9 | Gryazin / Aleksandrov | Škoda Fabia RS Rally2 | 7:37.4 | Cachón / Rozada |
| SS10 | Gryazin / Aleksandrov | Škoda Fabia RS Rally2 | 12:03.9 | Cachón / Rozada |
| SS11 | Gryazin / Aleksandrov | Škoda Fabia RS Rally2 | 8:16.7 | Cachón / Rozada |
| SS12 | Mareš / Bucha | Toyota GR Yaris Rally2 | 11:42.9 | Cachón / Rozada |
| SS13 | Cachón / Rozada | Toyota GR Yaris Rally2 | 8:14.3 | Cachón / Rozada |
| SS14 | Mareš / Bucha | Toyota GR Yaris Rally2 | 7:39.4 | Černý / Krajča |
| SS15 | stage cancelled | | | |
| SS16 | Gryazin / Aleksandrov | Škoda Fabia RS Rally2 | 14:55.3 | Černý / Krajča |
| SS17 | Mareš / Bucha | Toyota GR Yaris Rally2 | 6:21.6 | Černý / Krajča |
| SS18 | Mareš / Bucha | Toyota GR Yaris Rally2 | 14:49.7 | Černý / Krajča |

Challenger
| Stage | Winners | Car | Time | Class leaders |
|---|---|---|---|---|
| SD | Cachón / Rozada | Toyota GR Yaris Rally2 | 2:23.8 | —N/a |
| SS1 | Cachón / Rozada | Toyota GR Yaris Rally2 | 6:45.4 | Cachón / Rozada |
| SS2 | Cachón / Rozada | Toyota GR Yaris Rally2 | 6:46.3 | Cachón / Rozada |
| SS3 | Cachón / Rozada | Toyota GR Yaris Rally2 | 5:51.6 | Cachón / Rozada |
| SS4 | Cachón / Rozada | Toyota GR Yaris Rally2 | 7:57.3 | Cachón / Rozada |
| SS5 | Mareš / Bucha | Toyota GR Yaris Rally2 | 13:09.9 | Cachón / Rozada |
| SS6 | Cachón / Rozada | Toyota GR Yaris Rally2 | 12:58.3 | Cachón / Rozada |
| SS7 | Gryazin / Aleksandrov | Škoda Fabia RS Rally2 | 7:58.9 | Cachón / Rozada |
| SS8 | Rossel / Mercoiret | Citroën C3 Rally2 | 5:51.2 | Cachón / Rozada |
| SS9 | Gryazin / Aleksandrov | Škoda Fabia RS Rally2 | 7:37.4 | Cachón / Rozada |
| SS10 | Gryazin / Aleksandrov | Škoda Fabia RS Rally2 | 12:03.9 | Cachón / Rozada |
| SS11 | Gryazin / Aleksandrov | Škoda Fabia RS Rally2 | 8:16.7 | Cachón / Rozada |
| SS12 | Mareš / Bucha | Toyota GR Yaris Rally2 | 11:42.9 | Cachón / Rozada |
| SS13 | Cachón / Rozada | Toyota GR Yaris Rally2 | 8:14.3 | Cachón / Rozada |
| SS14 | Mareš / Bucha | Toyota GR Yaris Rally2 | 7:39.4 | Černý / Krajča |
| SS15 | stage cancelled | | | |
| SS16 | Gryazin / Aleksandrov | Škoda Fabia RS Rally2 | 14:55.3 | Černý / Krajča |
| SS17 | Mareš / Bucha | Toyota GR Yaris Rally2 | 6:21.6 | Černý / Krajča |
| SS18 | Mareš / Bucha | Toyota GR Yaris Rally2 | 14:49.7 | Černý / Krajča |

==== Championship standings ====
- **Bold text** indicates 2025 World Champions.

Drivers' Standings
| Move | Pos. | Driver | Points |
|---|---|---|---|
| | 1 | **Oliver Solberg** | 135 |
| | 2 | Yohan Rossel | 99 |
| | 3 | Roope Korhonen | 69 |
| | 4 | Jakko Viilo | 60 |
| | 5 | Jonas Andersson | 57 |

Co-drivers' Standings
| Move | Pos. | Driver | Points |
|---|---|---|---|
| | 1 | **Elliott Edmondson** | 135 |
| | 2 | Arnaud Dunand | 99 |
| | 3 | Anssi Viinikka | 69 |
| 3 | 4 | Roberto Daprà | 64 |
| 1 | 5 | Jakko Viilo | 60 |

Manufacturers' Standings
| Move | Pos. | Driver | Points |
|---|---|---|---|
| | 1 | Toksport WRT | 198 |
| | 2 | PH Sport | 178 |
| | 3 | Toyota Gazoo Racing WRT NG | 89 |
| | 4 | Sarrazin Motorsport – Iron Lynx | 64 |

Challenger Drivers' Standings
| Move | Pos. | Driver | Points |
|---|---|---|---|
| | 1 | Roope Korhonen | 90 |
| 3 | 2 | Roberto Daprà | 86 |
| 3 | 3 | Nikolay Gryazin | 77 |
| 2 | 4 | Robert Virves | 75 |
| 2 | 5 | Jan Solans | 72 |

Challenger Co-drivers' Standings
| Move | Pos. | Driver | Points |
|---|---|---|---|
| | 1 | Anssi Viinikka | 90 |
| 3 | 2 | Konstantin Aleksandrov | 77 |
| 1 | 3 | Jakko Viilo | 75 |
| 1 | 4 | Diego Sanjuan de Eusebio | 72 |
| 1 | 5 | Maciej Szczepaniak | 72 |

=== WRC3 Rally3 ===
==== Classification ====
| Position | | No. | Driver | Co-driver | Entrant | Car | Time | Difference | Points |
| Event | Class | No. | Driver | Co-driver | Entrant | Car | Time | Difference | Points |
|---|---|---|---|---|---|---|---|---|---|
| 12 | 1 | 34 | Mille Johansson | Johan Grönvall | Mille Johansson | Ford Fiesta Rally3 | 2:54:27.8 | 0.0 | 25 |
| 13 | 2 | 32 | Taylor Gill | Daniel Brkic | FIA Rally Star | Ford Fiesta Rally3 | 2:54:29.4 | +1.6 | 17 |
| 14 | 3 | 37 | Kerem Kazaz | Luca Guglielmetti | Team Petrol Ofisi | Ford Fiesta Rally3 | 2:58:52.7 | +4:24.9 | 15 |
| 15 | 4 | 38 | Diego Dominguez Jr. | Rogelio Peñate | Diego Dominguez Jr. | Ford Fiesta Rally3 | 2:59:06.7 | +4:38.9 | 12 |
| 16 | 5 | 40 | Claire Schönborn | Michael Wenzel | WRC Young Driver Program | Ford Fiesta Rally3 | 3:00:21.5 | +5:53.7 | 10 |
| 34 | 6 | 28 | Fabio Schwarz | Pascal Raabe | Armin Schwarz Driving Experience | Toyota GR Yaris Rally2 | 3:31:39.4 | +55:19.3 | 8 |
| Retired SS17 | | 35 | Ali Türkkan | Oytun Albayrak | Castrol Ford Team Türkiye | Ford Fiesta Rally3 | Accident | | 0 |
| Retired SS5 | | 39 | Max Smart | Malcolm Read | FIA Rally Star | Ford Fiesta Rally3 | Front suspension | | 0 |
| Retired SS1 | | 31 | Tom Pellerey | Hervé Faucher | Tom Pellerey | Renault Clio Rally3 | Rolled | | 0 |

==== Special stages ====
| Stage | Winners | Car | Time | Class leaders |
|---|---|---|---|---|
| SD | Gill / Brkic | Ford Fiesta Rally3 | 2:35.3 | —N/a |
| SS1 | Gill / Brkic | Ford Fiesta Rally3 | 7:09.8 | Gill / Brkic |
| SS2 | Türkkan / Albayrak | Ford Fiesta Rally3 | 7:11.8 | Türkkan / Albayrak |
| SS3 | Gill / Brkic | Ford Fiesta Rally3 | 6:14.5 | Türkkan / Albayrak |
| SS4 | Türkkan / Albayrak | Ford Fiesta Rally3 | 8:29.5 | Türkkan / Albayrak |
| SS5 | Gill / Brkic | Ford Fiesta Rally3 | 13:46.6 | Türkkan / Albayrak |
| SS6 | Türkkan / Albayrak | Ford Fiesta Rally3 | 13:33.8 | Türkkan / Albayrak |
| SS7 | Türkkan / Albayrak | Ford Fiesta Rally3 | 8:26.9 | Türkkan / Albayrak |
| SS8 | Gill / Brkic | Ford Fiesta Rally3 | 6:17.6 | Türkkan / Albayrak |
| SS9 | Gill / Brkic | Ford Fiesta Rally3 | 8:02.7 | Türkkan / Albayrak |
| SS10 | Gill / Brkic | Ford Fiesta Rally3 | 12:29.8 | Türkkan / Albayrak |
| SS11 | Türkkan / Albayrak | Ford Fiesta Rally3 | 8:43.1 | Türkkan / Albayrak |
| SS12 | Gill / Brkic | Ford Fiesta Rally3 | 11:59.4 | Türkkan / Albayrak |
| SS13 | Gill / Brkic | Ford Fiesta Rally3 | 8:36.4 | Türkkan / Albayrak |
| SS14 | Türkkan / Albayrak | Ford Fiesta Rally3 | 8:03.0 | Türkkan / Albayrak |
| SS15 | stage cancelled | | | |
| SS16 | Türkkan / Albayrak | Ford Fiesta Rally3 | 15:38.3 | Türkkan / Albayrak |
| SS17 | Gill / Brkic | Ford Fiesta Rally3 | 6:38.6 | Gill / Brkic |
| SS18 | Gill / Brkic | Ford Fiesta Rally3 | 15:32.8 | Gill / Brkic |

==== Championship standings ====
Drivers' Standings
| Move | Pos. | Driver | Points |
|---|---|---|---|
| 1 | 1 | Taylor Gill | 117 |
| 1 | 2 | Matteo Fontana | 109 |
| 4 | 3 | Kerem Kazaz | 72 |
| 1 | 4 | Arthur Pelamourges | 60 |
| 1 | 5 | Nataniel Bruun | 60 |

Co-drivers' Standings
| Move | Pos. | Driver | Points |
|---|---|---|---|
| 1 | 1 | Daniel Brkic | 117 |
| 1 | 2 | Alessandro Arnaboldi | 109 |
| 3 | 3 | Corentin Silvestre | 72 |
| 1 | 4 | Bastien Pouget | 60 |
| 1 | 5 | Pablo Olmos | 60 |

=== JWRC Rally3 ===
==== Classification ====
| Position | | No. | Driver | Co-driver | Entrant | Car | Time | Difference | Points | |
| Event | Class | No. | Driver | Co-driver | Entrant | Car | Time | Difference | Class | Stage |
|---|---|---|---|---|---|---|---|---|---|---|
| 12 | 1 | 34 | Mille Johansson | Johan Grönvall | Mille Johansson | Ford Fiesta Rally3 | 2:54:27.8 | 0.0 | 50 | 7 |
| 13 | 2 | 32 | Taylor Gill | Daniel Brkic | FIA Rally Star | Ford Fiesta Rally3 | 2:54:29.4 | +1.6 | 34 | 5 |
| 14 | 3 | 37 | Kerem Kazaz | Luca Guglielmetti | Team Petrol Ofisi | Ford Fiesta Rally3 | 2:58:52.7 | +4:24.9 | 30 | 0 |
| 15 | 4 | 38 | Diego Dominguez Jr. | Rogelio Peñate | Diego Dominguez Jr. | Ford Fiesta Rally3 | 2:59:06.7 | +4:38.9 | 24 | 0 |
| 16 | 5 | 40 | Claire Schönborn | Michael Wenzel | WRC Young Driver Program | Ford Fiesta Rally3 | 3:00:21.5 | +5:53.7 | 20 | 0 |
| Retired SS17 | | 35 | Ali Türkkan | Oytun Albayrak | Castrol Ford Team Türkiye | Ford Fiesta Rally3 | Accident | | 0 | 4 |
| Retired SS5 | | 31 | Max Smart | Malcolm Read | FIA Rally Star | Ford Fiesta Rally3 | Front suspension | | 0 | 0 |
| Retired SS1 | | 31 | Tom Pellerey | Hervé Faucher | Tom Pellerey | Renault Clio Rally3 | Rolled | | 0 | 0 |

==== Special stages ====
| Stage | Winners | Car | Time | Class leaders |
|---|---|---|---|---|
| SD | Gill / Brkic | Ford Fiesta Rally3 | 2:35.3 | —N/a |
| SS1 | Johansson / Grönvall | Ford Fiesta Rally3 | 7:09.3 | Johansson / Grönvall |
| SS2 | Johansson / Grönvall | Ford Fiesta Rally3 | 7:11.0 | Johansson / Grönvall |
| SS3 | Gill / Brkic | Ford Fiesta Rally3 | 6:14.5 | Johansson / Grönvall |
| SS4 | Türkkan / Albayrak | Ford Fiesta Rally3 | 8:29.5 | Johansson / Grönvall |
| SS5 | Gill / Brkic | Ford Fiesta Rally3 | 13:46.6 | Türkkan / Albayrak |
| SS6 | Türkkan / Albayrak | Ford Fiesta Rally3 | 13:33.8 | Türkkan / Albayrak |
| SS7 | Türkkan / Albayrak | Ford Fiesta Rally3 | 8:26.9 | Türkkan / Albayrak |
| SS8 | Johansson / Grönvall | Ford Fiesta Rally3 | 6:16.3 | Türkkan / Albayrak |
| SS9 | Gill / Brkic | Ford Fiesta Rally3 | 8:02.7 | Türkkan / Albayrak |
| SS10 | Gill / Brkic | Ford Fiesta Rally3 | 12:29.8 | Türkkan / Albayrak |
| SS11 | Türkkan / Albayrak | Ford Fiesta Rally3 | 8:43.1 | Türkkan / Albayrak |
| SS12 | Gill / Brkic | Ford Fiesta Rally3 | 11:59.4 | Türkkan / Albayrak |
| SS13 | Gill / Brkic | Ford Fiesta Rally3 | 8:36.4 | Türkkan / Albayrak |
| SS14 | Türkkan / Albayrak | Ford Fiesta Rally3 | 8:03.0 | Türkkan / Albayrak |
| SS15 | stage cancelled | | | |
| SS16 | Türkkan / Albayrak | Ford Fiesta Rally3 | 15:38.3 | Türkkan / Albayrak |
| SS17 | Gill / Brkic | Ford Fiesta Rally3 | 6:38.6 | Gill / Brkic |
| SS18 | Gill / Brkic | Ford Fiesta Rally3 | 15:32.8 | Gill / Brkic |

==== Championship standings ====
- **Bold text** indicates 2025 World Champions.

Drivers' Standings
| Move | Pos. | Driver | Points |
|---|---|---|---|
| 1 | 1 | **Mille Johansson** | 135 |
| 1 | 2 | Taylor Gill | 123 |
| | 3 | Ali Türkkan | 69 |
| 1 | 4 | Kerem Kazaz | 68 |
| 1 | 5 | Eamonn Kelly | 60 |

Co-drivers' Standings
| Move | Pos. | Driver | Points |
|---|---|---|---|
| 1 | 1 | **Johan Grönvall** | 135 |
| 1 | 2 | Daniel Brkic | 123 |
| | 3 | Oytun Albayrak | 69 |
| 1 | 4 | Corentin Silvestre | 68 |
| 1 | 5 | Conor Mohan | 60 |

| Previous rally: 2025 Rally Chile | 2025 FIA World Rally Championship | Next rally: 2025 Rally Japan |
| Previous rally: 2024 Central European Rally | 2025 Central European Rally | Next rally: none |
