= Toyota GR Yaris Rally1 =

Toyota Rally1 rally car

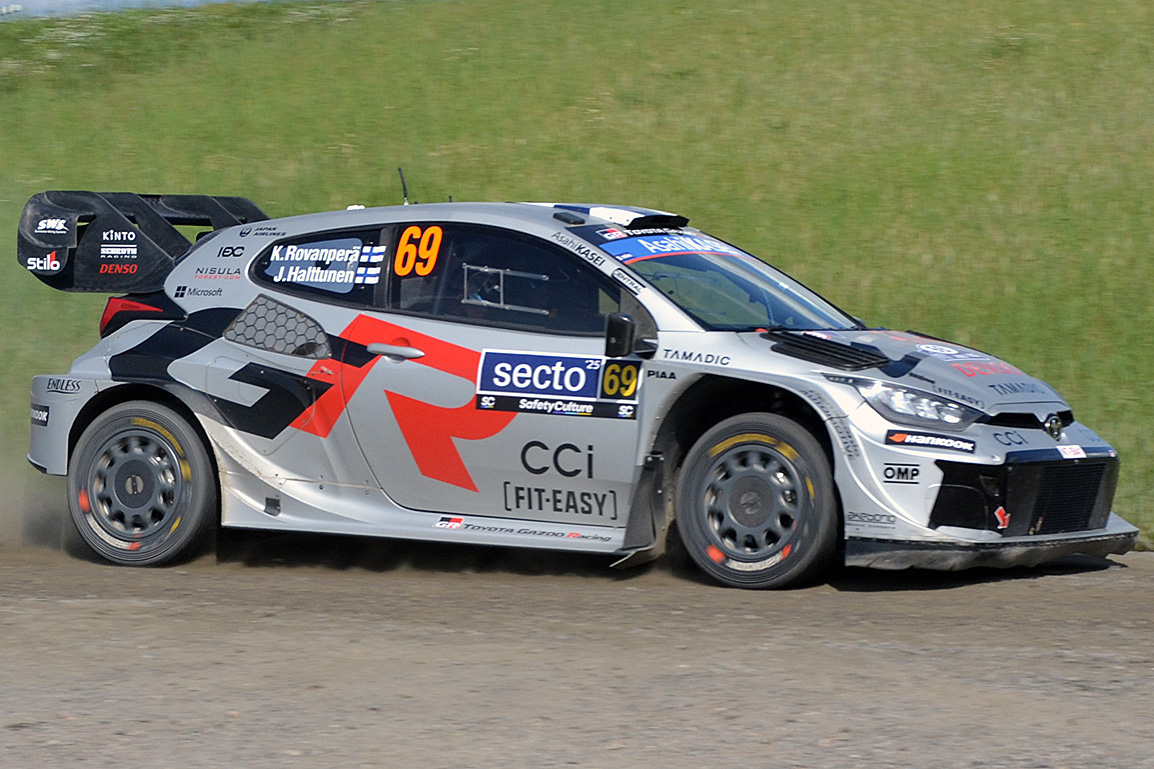
- GR Yaris Rally1 of Kalle Rovanperä at the 2025 Rally Finland.
- Category: Rally1
- Constructor: Toyota
- Designer: Tom Fowler (technical director)
- Predecessor: Toyota Yaris WRC
- Successor: Toyota GR Celica Rally1

Technical specifications
- Chassis: Tubular spaceframe
- Suspension: MacPherson strut
- Length: 4,225 mm
- Width: 1,875 mm
- Axle track: Adjustable
- Wheelbase: 2,630 mm
- Engine: Toyota GI4B 1,600 cc (97.6 cu in) I4 turbocharged direct injection 386 PS plug-in hybrid with a 100 kW (134 hp; 136 PS) electric motor and 3.9 kWh battery (Note: Hybrid unit was removed for the 2025 season onwards.) transversally front-mounted
- Transmission: 5-speed sequential manual mechanical front and rear differential
- Weight: 1,260 kg (1,180 kg with hybrid unit removed)
- Fuel: P1 Racing Fuels WRC-spec sustainable fossil-free fuel
- Lubricants: Mobil 1
- Brakes: 300–370 mm disc brakes
- Tyres: 2022–2024: Pirelli P Zero (for tarmac); Pirelli Cinturato (for wet tarmac); Pirelli Sottozero (for ice/snow); Pirelli Scorpion (for gravel, clay and rest of dirt-type surfaces); 2025–present: Hankook
- Clutch: Double plate sintered clutch

Competition history
- Notable entrants: (Japan) Toyota Gazoo Racing WRT; (Japan) Toyota Gazoo Racing WRT NG; (Japan) Toyota Gazoo Racing WRT2
- Notable drivers: (United Kingdom) Elfyn Evans; (Japan) Takamoto Katsuta; (Finland) Esapekka Lappi; (France) Sébastien Ogier; (Finland) Kalle Rovanperä; (Italy) Lorenzo Bertelli; (Finland) Sami Pajari; (Sweden) Oliver Solberg
- Debut: (Monaco) 2022 Monte Carlo Rally
- First win: 2022 Rally Sweden
- Last win: (Italy) 2026 Rally Italia Sardegna
- Last event: (Italy) 2026 Rally Italia Sardegna
Races	Wins	Podiums	Titles
65	48	114	12
- Constructors' Championships: 5 (2022, 2023, 2024, 2025, 2026)
- Drivers' Championships: 4 (2022, 2023, 2025, 2026)

The Toyota GR Yaris Rally1 is a Rally1 car built by Toyota Gazoo Racing WRT that has been driven in the World Rally Championship since 2022. The prototype car is based on the GR Yaris production car. The car won the Autosport Awards Rally Car of the Year in 2022.

== World Rally Championship results ==
=== Championship titles ===
Year	Title	Competitor	Entries	Wins	Podiums	Points	Ref.
2022	FIA World Rally Championship for Drivers	(Finland) Kalle Rovanperä	13	6	8	255	
2022	FIA World Rally Championship for Co-Drivers	(Finland) Jonne Halttunen	13	6	8	255	
2022	FIA World Rally Championship for Manufacturers	(Japan) Toyota Gazoo Racing WRT	39	7	20	525	
2023	FIA World Rally Championship for Drivers	(Finland) Kalle Rovanperä	13	3	8	250	
2023	FIA World Rally Championship for Co-Drivers	(Finland) Jonne Halttunen	13	3	8	250	
2023	FIA World Rally Championship for Manufacturers	(Japan) Toyota Gazoo Racing WRT	39	8	17	548	
2024	FIA World Rally Championship for Manufacturers	(Japan) Toyota Gazoo Racing WRT	39	8	19	561	
2025	FIA World Rally Championship for Drivers	(France) Sébastien Ogier	11	6	10	293	
2025	FIA World Rally Championship for Co-Drivers	(France) Vincent Landais	11	6	10	293	
2025	FIA World Rally Championship for Manufacturers	(Japan) Toyota Gazoo Racing WRT	42	11	26	735	
2026	FIA World Rally Championship for Drivers	(United Kingdom) Elfyn Evans	12	2	6	243	
2026	FIA World Rally Championship for Co-Drivers	(United Kingdom) Scott Martin	12	2	6	243	
2026	FIA World Rally Championship for Manufacturers	(Japan) Toyota Gazoo Racing WRT	48	12	22	662	

=== WRC victories ===
Year	Po.	Event	Surface	Driver	Co-driver	Entrant	Ref.
2022	1	2022 Rally Sweden	Snow	(Finland) Kalle Rovanperä	(Finland) Jonne Halttunen	(Japan) Toyota Gazoo Racing WRT	
2022	2	2022 Croatia Rally	Tarmac	(Finland) Kalle Rovanperä	(Finland) Jonne Halttunen	(Japan) Toyota Gazoo Racing WRT	
2022	3	2022 Rally de Portugal	Gravel	(Finland) Kalle Rovanperä	(Finland) Jonne Halttunen	(Japan) Toyota Gazoo Racing WRT	
2022	4	(Kenya) 2022 Safari Rally	Gravel	(Finland) Kalle Rovanperä	(Finland) Jonne Halttunen	(Japan) Toyota Gazoo Racing WRT	
2022	5	2022 Rally Estonia	Gravel	(Finland) Kalle Rovanperä	(Finland) Jonne Halttunen	(Japan) Toyota Gazoo Racing WRT	
2022	6	2022 Rally New Zealand	Gravel	(Finland) Kalle Rovanperä	(Finland) Jonne Halttunen	(Japan) Toyota Gazoo Racing WRT	
2022	7	(Spain) 2022 Rally Catalunya	Tarmac	(France) Sébastien Ogier	(France) Benjamin Veillas	(Japan) Toyota Gazoo Racing WRT	
2023	8	(Monaco) 2023 Monte Carlo Rally	Mixed	(France) Sébastien Ogier	(France) Vincent Landais	(Japan) Toyota Gazoo Racing WRT	
2023	9	2023 Rally Mexico	Gravel	(France) Sébastien Ogier	(France) Vincent Landais	(Japan) Toyota Gazoo Racing WRT	
2023	10	2023 Croatia Rally	Tarmac	(United Kingdom) Elfyn Evans	(United Kingdom) Scott Martin	(Japan) Toyota Gazoo Racing WRT	
2023	11	2023 Rally de Portugal	Gravel	(Finland) Kalle Rovanperä	(Finland) Jonne Halttunen	(Japan) Toyota Gazoo Racing WRT	
2023	12	(Kenya) 2023 Safari Rally	Gravel	(France) Sébastien Ogier	(France) Vincent Landais	(Japan) Toyota Gazoo Racing WRT	
2023	13	2023 Rally Estonia	Gravel	(Finland) Kalle Rovanperä	(Finland) Jonne Halttunen	(Japan) Toyota Gazoo Racing WRT	
2023	14	2023 Rally Finland	Gravel	(United Kingdom) Elfyn Evans	(United Kingdom) Scott Martin	(Japan) Toyota Gazoo Racing WRT	
2023	15	(Greece) 2023 Acropolis Rally	Gravel	(Finland) Kalle Rovanperä	(Finland) Jonne Halttunen	(Japan) Toyota Gazoo Racing WRT	
2023	16	2023 Rally Japan	Tarmac	(United Kingdom) Elfyn Evans	(United Kingdom) Scott Martin	(Japan) Toyota Gazoo Racing WRT	
2024	17	(Kenya) 2024 Safari Rally	Gravel	(Finland) Kalle Rovanperä	(Finland) Jonne Halttunen	(Japan) Toyota Gazoo Racing WRT	
2024	18	2024 Croatia Rally	Tarmac	(France) Sébastien Ogier	(France) Vincent Landais	(Japan) Toyota Gazoo Racing WRT	
2024	19	2024 Rally de Portugal	Gravel	(France) Sébastien Ogier	(France) Vincent Landais	(Japan) Toyota Gazoo Racing WRT	
2024	20	2024 Rally Poland	Gravel	(Finland) Kalle Rovanperä	(Finland) Jonne Halttunen	(Japan) Toyota Gazoo Racing WRT	
2024	21	2024 Rally Latvia	Gravel	(Finland) Kalle Rovanperä	(Finland) Jonne Halttunen	(Japan) Toyota Gazoo Racing WRT	
2024	22	2024 Rally Finland	Gravel	(France) Sébastien Ogier	(France) Vincent Landais	(Japan) Toyota Gazoo Racing WRT	
2024	23	2024 Rally Chile	Gravel	(Finland) Kalle Rovanperä	(Finland) Jonne Halttunen	(Japan) Toyota Gazoo Racing WRT	
2024	24	2024 Rally Japan	Tarmac	(United Kingdom) Elfyn Evans	(United Kingdom) Scott Martin	(Japan) Toyota Gazoo Racing WRT	
2025	25	(Monaco) 2025 Monte Carlo Rally	Mixed	(France) Sébastien Ogier	(France) Vincent Landais	(Japan) Toyota Gazoo Racing WRT	
2025	26	2025 Rally Sweden	Snow	(United Kingdom) Elfyn Evans	(United Kingdom) Scott Martin	(Japan) Toyota Gazoo Racing WRT	
2025	27	(Kenya) 2025 Safari Rally	Gravel	(United Kingdom) Elfyn Evans	(United Kingdom) Scott Martin	(Japan) Toyota Gazoo Racing WRT	
2025	28	(Spain) 2025 Rally Islas Canarias	Tarmac	(Finland) Kalle Rovanperä	(Finland) Jonne Halttunen	(Japan) Toyota Gazoo Racing WRT	
2025	29	2025 Rally de Portugal	Gravel	(France) Sébastien Ogier	(France) Vincent Landais	(Japan) Toyota Gazoo Racing WRT	
2025	30	(Italy) 2025 Rally Italia Sardegna	Gravel	(France) Sébastien Ogier	(France) Vincent Landais	(Japan) Toyota Gazoo Racing WRT	
2025	31	2025 Rally Estonia	Gravel	(Sweden) Oliver Solberg	(United Kingdom) Elliott Edmondson	(Japan) Toyota Gazoo Racing WRT	
2025	32	2025 Rally Finland	Gravel	(Finland) Kalle Rovanperä	(Finland) Jonne Halttunen	(Japan) Toyota Gazoo Racing WRT	
2025	33	2025 Rally del Paraguay	Gravel	(France) Sébastien Ogier	(France) Vincent Landais	(Japan) Toyota Gazoo Racing WRT	
2025	34	2025 Rally Chile	Gravel	(France) Sébastien Ogier	(France) Vincent Landais	(Japan) Toyota Gazoo Racing WRT	
2025	35	(Europe) 2025 Central European Rally	Tarmac	(Finland) Kalle Rovanperä	(Finland) Jonne Halttunen	(Japan) Toyota Gazoo Racing WRT	
2025	36	2025 Rally Japan	Tarmac	(France) Sébastien Ogier	(France) Vincent Landais	(Japan) Toyota Gazoo Racing WRT	
2026	37	(Monaco) 2026 Monte Carlo Rally	Mixed	(Sweden) Oliver Solberg	(United Kingdom) Elliott Edmondson	(Japan) Toyota Gazoo Racing WRT	
2026	38	2026 Rally Sweden	Snow	(United Kingdom) Elfyn Evans	(United Kingdom) Scott Martin	(Japan) Toyota Gazoo Racing WRT	
2026	39	(Kenya) 2026 Safari Rally	Gravel	(Japan) Takamoto Katsuta	(Republic of Ireland) Aaron Johnston	(Japan) Toyota Gazoo Racing WRT	
2026	40	2026 Croatia Rally	Tarmac	(Japan) Takamoto Katsuta	(Republic of Ireland) Aaron Johnston	(Japan) Toyota Gazoo Racing WRT	
2026	41	(Spain) 2026 Rally Islas Canarias	Tarmac	(France) Sébastien Ogier	(France) Vincent Landais	(Japan) Toyota Gazoo Racing WRT	
2026	42	2026 Rally Japan	Tarmac	(United Kingdom) Elfyn Evans	(United Kingdom) Scott Martin	(Japan) Toyota Gazoo Racing WRT	
2026	43	(Greece) 2026 Acropolis Rally	Gravel	(France) Sébastien Ogier	(France) Vincent Landais	(Japan) Toyota Gazoo Racing WRT	
2026	44	2026 Rally Estonia	Gravel	(Finland) Sami Pajari	(Finland) Marko Salminen	(Japan) Toyota Gazoo Racing WRT2	
2026	45	2026 Rally Finland	Gravel	(Finland) Sami Pajari	(Finland) Marko Salminen	(Japan) Toyota Gazoo Racing WRT2	
2026	46	2026 Rally del Paraguay	Gravel	(Finland) Sami Pajari	(Finland) Marko Salminen	(Japan) Toyota Gazoo Racing WRT2	
2026	47	2026 Rally Chile	Gravel	(Sweden) Oliver Solberg	(United Kingdom) Elliott Edmondson	(Japan) Toyota Gazoo Racing WRT	
2026	48	(Italy) 2026 Rally Italia Sardegna	Gravel	(Sweden) Oliver Solberg	(United Kingdom) Elliott Edmondson	(Japan) Toyota Gazoo Racing WRT	

== Rally results ==
=== Complete World Rally Championship results ===
Year	Entrant	Driver	Rounds														Points	WCM pos.
Year	Entrant	Driver	1	2	3	4	5	6	7	8	9	10	11	12	13	14	Points	WCM pos.
2022	Toyota Gazoo Racing WRT	(United Kingdom) Elfyn Evans	MON; 21	SWE; Ret	CRO; 5	POR; 2	ITA; 40	KEN; 2	EST; 2	FIN; 4	BEL; 2	GRE; Ret	NZL; Ret	ESP; 6	JPN; 5		525	1st
2022	Toyota Gazoo Racing WRT	(Finland) Esapekka Lappi	MON	SWE; 3	CRO; 49	POR	ITA; 44	KEN	EST; 6	FIN; 3	BEL; 3	GRE; 22	NZL	ESP	JPN		525	1st
2022	Toyota Gazoo Racing WRT	(France) Sébastien Ogier	MON; 2	SWE	CRO	POR; 51	ITA	KEN; 4	EST	FIN	BEL	GRE	NZL; 2	ESP; 1	JPN; 4		525	1st
2022	Toyota Gazoo Racing WRT	(Finland) Kalle Rovanperä	MON; 4	SWE; 1	CRO; 1	POR; 1	ITA; 5	KEN; 1	EST; 1	FIN; 2	BEL; 62	GRE; 15	NZL; 1	ESP; 3	JPN; 12		525	1st
2022	Toyota Gazoo Racing WRT NG	(Japan) Takamoto Katsuta	MON; 8	SWE; 4	CRO; 6	POR; 4	ITA; 6	KEN; 3	EST; 5	FIN; 6	BEL; 5	GRE; 6	NZL; Ret	ESP; 7	JPN; 3		138	4th
2023	Toyota Gazoo Racing WRT	(United Kingdom) Elfyn Evans	MON; 4	SWE; 5	MEX; 3	CRO; 1	POR; Ret	ITA; 4	KEN; 3	EST; 4	FIN; 1	GRE; 2	CHL; 3	EUR; 31	JPN; 1		548	1st
2023	Toyota Gazoo Racing WRT	(France) Sébastien Ogier	MON; 1	SWE	MEX; 1	CRO; 5	POR	ITA; 14	KEN; 1	EST	FIN	GRE; 10	CHL	EUR; 4	JPN; 2		548	1st
2023	Toyota Gazoo Racing WRT	(Finland) Kalle Rovanperä	MON; 2	SWE; 4	MEX; 4	CRO; 4	POR; 1	ITA; 3	KEN; 2	EST; 1	FIN; Ret	GRE; 1	CHL; 4	EUR; 2	JPN; 3		548	1st
2023	Toyota Gazoo Racing WRT	(Japan) Takamoto Katsuta	MON; 6	SWE; Ret	MEX; 23	CRO; 6	POR; 33	ITA; 40	KEN; 4	EST; 7	FIN; 3	GRE; 6	CHL; 5	EUR; 5	JPN; 5		548	1st
2023	Toyota Gazoo Racing WRT	(Italy) Lorenzo Bertelli	MON	SWE; 14	MEX	CRO	POR	ITA	KEN	EST	FIN	GRE	CHL	EUR	JPN		–	–
2023	Toyota Gazoo Racing WRT	(Finland) Jari-Matti Latvala	MON	SWE	MEX	CRO	POR	ITA	KEN	EST	FIN; 5	GRE	CHL	EUR	JPN		–	–
2024	Toyota Gazoo Racing WRT																–	–
2024	Toyota Gazoo Racing WRT	(France) Sébastien Ogier	MON; 2	SWE	SAF	CRO; 1	POR; 1	ITA; 2	POL; WD	LAT; 2	FIN; 1	GRE; 16	CHL; 36	EUR; Ret	JPN; 2		561	1st
2024	Toyota Gazoo Racing WRT	(Japan) Takamoto Katsuta	MON; 7	SWE; 45	SAF; 2	CRO; 5	POR; 29	ITA; 35	POL; 8	LAT; 6	FIN; 41	GRE; 30	CHL; WD	EUR; 4	JPN; 4		561	1st
2024	Toyota Gazoo Racing WRT	(United Kingdom) Elfyn Evans	MON; 3	SWE; 2	SAF; 4	CRO; 2	POR; 6	ITA; 4	POL; 2	LAT; 5	FIN; Ret	GRE; 18	CHL; 2	EUR; 2	JPN; 1		561	1st
2024	Toyota Gazoo Racing WRT	(Finland) Kalle Rovanperä	MON	SWE; 39	SAF; 1	CRO	POR; 31	ITA	POL; 1	LAT; 1	FIN; Ret	GRE	CHL; 1	EUR	JPN		561	1st
2024	Toyota Gazoo Racing WRT	(Italy) Lorenzo Bertelli	MON	SWE; 10	SAF	CRO	POR	ITA	POL	LAT	FIN	GRE	CHL	EUR	JPN		–	–
2024	Toyota Gazoo Racing WRT	(Finland) Sami Pajari	MON	SWE	SAF	CRO	POR	ITA	POL	LAT	FIN; 4	GRE	CHL; 6	EUR; Ret	JPN		–	–
2025	Toyota Gazoo Racing WRT																	
2025	Toyota Gazoo Racing WRT	(Finland) Kalle Rovanperä	MON; 4	SWE; 5	KEN; Ret	ESP; 1	POR; 3	ITA; 3	GRE; 26	EST; 4	FIN; 1	PAR; 5	CHL; 6	EUR; 1	JPN; 6	SAU; 7	735	1st
2025	Toyota Gazoo Racing WRT	(United Kingdom) Elfyn Evans	MON; 2	SWE; 1	KEN; 1	ESP; 3	POR; 6	ITA; 4	GRE; 4	EST; 6	FIN; 4	PAR; 2	CHL; 2	EUR; 2	JPN; 2	SAU; 6	735	1st
2025	Toyota Gazoo Racing WRT	(France) Sébastien Ogier	MON; 1	SWE	KEN	ESP; 2	POR; 1	ITA; 1	GRE; 2	EST	FIN; 3	PAR; 1	CHL; 1	EUR; 29	JPN; 1	SAU; 3	735	1st
2025	Toyota Gazoo Racing WRT	(Japan) Takamoto Katsuta	MON; Ret	SWE; 2	KEN; Ret	ESP; 4	POR; 5	ITA; 5	GRE; 30	EST; Ret	FIN; 2	PAR; 16	CHL; 7	EUR; 4	JPN; 14	SAU; 5	735	1st
2025	Toyota Gazoo Racing WRT	(Sweden) Oliver Solberg	MON	SWE	KEN	ESP	POR	ITA	GRE	EST; 1	FIN	PAR	CHL	EUR	JPN	SAU	–	–
2025	Toyota Gazoo Racing WRT2	(Finland) Sami Pajari	MON; Ret	SWE; 7	KEN; 4	ESP; Ret	POR; 7	ITA; 7	GRE; 46	EST; 7	FIN; 5	PAR; 6	CHL; 5	EUR; 6	JPN; 3	SAU; 4	158	4th
2026	Toyota Gazoo Racing WRT	(France) Sébastien Ogier	MON; 3	SWE	KEN; 11	CRO	ESP; 1	POR; 6	JPN; 2	GRE; 1	EST; 5	FIN; Ret	PAR; 34	CHL; 2	ITA; 2	SAU; C	1st	662
2026	Toyota Gazoo Racing WRT	(Japan) Takamoto Katsuta	MON; 7	SWE; 2	KEN; 1	CRO; 1	ESP; 4	POR; 5	JPN; 4	GRE; 3	EST; 21	FIN; 6	PAR; Ret	CHL; 36	ITA; 6	SAU; C	1st	662
2026	Toyota Gazoo Racing WRT	(United Kingdom) Elfyn Evans	MON; 2	SWE; 1	KEN; 13	CRO; 34	ESP; 2	POR; 3	JPN; 1	GRE; 5	EST; 6	FIN; 3	PAR; 4	CHL; 5	ITA; 5	SAU; C	1st	662
2026	Toyota Gazoo Racing WRT	(Italy) Lorenzo Bertelli	MON	SWE; 15	KEN	CRO	ESP	POR	JPN	GRE	EST	FIN	PAR	CHL	ITA	SAU; C	1st	662
2026	Toyota Gazoo Racing WRT	(Sweden) Oliver Solberg	MON; 1	SWE; 4	KEN; 10	CRO; 42	ESP; Ret	POR; 2	JPN; 21	GRE; 16	EST; 2	FIN; 2	PAR; 5	CHL; 1	ITA; 1	SAU; C	1st	662
2026	Toyota Gazoo Racing WRT2	(Finland) Sami Pajari	MON; Ret	SWE; 3	KEN; 3	CRO; 2	ESP; 3	POR; 7	JPN; 3	GRE; 4	EST; 1	FIN; 1	PAR; 1	CHL; 4	ITA; 3	SAU; C	3rd	251

* Season still in progress.

== Notes ==
Awards
Preceded by Toyota Yaris WRC	Autosport Awards; Rally Car of the Year; 2022	Succeeded by Incumbent
