= 2026 Rally de Portugal =

59th edition of the Rally de Portugal

2026 Rally de Portugal Vodafone Rally de Portugal 2026
Round 6 of 13 in the 2026 World Rally Championship
← Previous event	Next event →
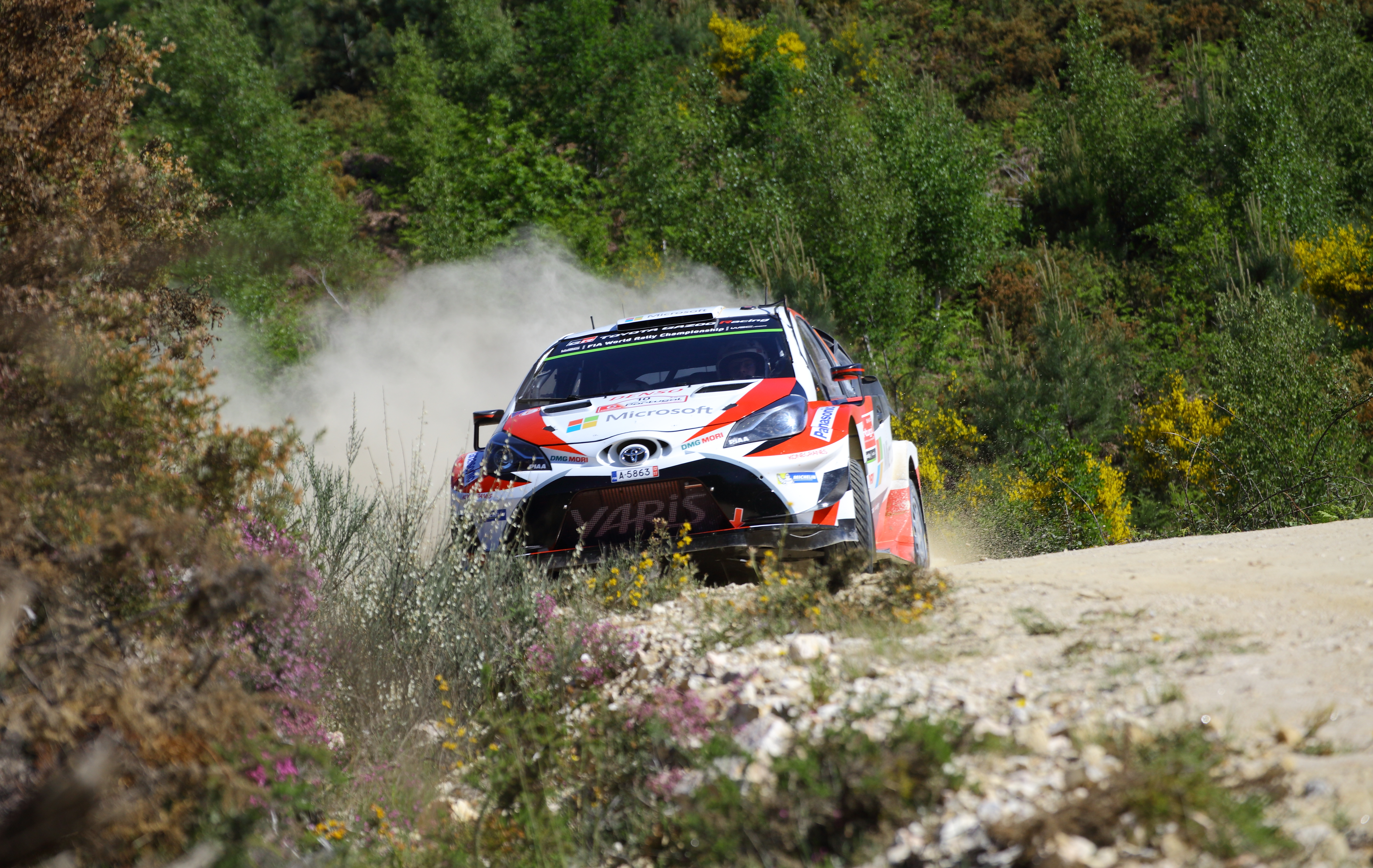
- Rocks and deep ruts were the features of the Rally de Portugal.
- Host country: Portugal
- Rally base: Matosinhos, Porto
- Dates run: 7 – 10 May 2026
- Start location: Coimbra, Central Region
- Finish location: Fafe, Braga
- Stages: 23 (345.14 km; 214.46 miles)
- Stage surface: Gravel
- Transport distance: 1,516.55 km (942.34 miles)
- Overall distance: 1,861.69 km (1,156.80 miles)

Statistics
- Crews registered: 70
- Crews: 67 at start, 47 at finish

Overall results
- Overall winner: (Belgium) Thierry Neuville (Belgium) Martijn Wydaeghe (South Korea) Hyundai Shell Mobis WRT; 3:53:01.7
- Sunday Accumulated leader: (Sweden) Oliver Solberg (United Kingdom) Elliott Edmondson (Japan) Toyota Gazoo Racing WRT; 43:15.1
- Power Stage winner: (France) Adrien Fourmaux (France) Alexandre Coria (South Korea) Hyundai Shell Mobis WRT; 6:52.1

Support category results
- WRC-2 winner: (Finland) Teemu Suninen (Finland) Janni Hussi; 4:04:15.5
- WRC-3 winner: (Italy) Matteo Fontana (Italy) Alessandro Arnaboldi; 4:23:26.8
- J-WRC winner: (Turkey) Ali Türkkan (Turkey) Oytun Albaykar (Turkey) Castrol Ford Team Türkiye; 4:24:45.4

The 2026 Rally de Portugal (also known as the Vodafone Rally de Portugal 2026) was a motor racing event for rally cars that was held over four days from 7 to 10 May 2026. It marked the fifty-ninth running of the Rally de Portugal, and was the sixth round of the 2026 World Rally Championship, 2026 WRC2 Championship and 2026 WRC3 Championship. The event was also the third round of the 2026 Junior WRC Championship. The 2026 event was based in Matosinhos in the Porto District, and consisted of twenty-three special stages, covering a total competitive distance of 345.14 km (214.46 mi).

Sébastien Ogier and Vincent Landais were the defending rally winners and Toyota Gazoo Racing WRT were the defending manufacturer's winners. Oliver Solberg and Elliott Edmondson were the defending rally winners in the WRC2 championship, but they did not defend their titles as they were signed by Toyota to contest the top tier this season. Taylor Gill and Daniel Brkic were the defending rally winners in the WRC3 championship and the junior category.

Thierry Neuville and Martijn Wydaeghe won their first rally of the season, and Hyundai Shell Mobis WRT are their manufacturer's winner. Teemu Suninen and Janni Hussi were the winners in the WRC2 category. Matteo Fontana and Alessandro Arnaboldi were the winners in the WRC3 category. Ali Türkkan and Oytun Albaykar were the winners in the junior championship.

== Background ==
=== Entry list ===
The following crews were entered into the rally. The event was opened to crews competing in the World Rally Championship, its support categories, the WRC2 Championship, the WRC3 Championship and privateer entries that were not registered to score points in any championship. Eleven crews were entered under Rally1 regulations, as were thirty-four Rally2 crews in the WRC2 Championship and nine Rally3 crews in the WRC3 Championship. A total of seven crews participated in the Junior World Rally Championship.

Rally1 entries competing in the World Rally Championship
No.	Driver	Co-Driver	Entrant	Car	Championship eligibility	Tyre
1	(France) Sébastien Ogier	(France) Vincent Landais	(Japan) Toyota Gazoo Racing WRT	Toyota GR Yaris Rally1	Driver, Co-driver, Manufacturer	H
5	(Finland) Sami Pajari	(Finland) Marko Salminen	(Japan) Toyota Gazoo Racing WRT2	Toyota GR Yaris Rally1	Driver, Co-driver, Manufacturer, Team	H
6	(Spain) Dani Sordo	(Spain) Cándido Carrera	(South Korea) Hyundai Shell Mobis WRT	Hyundai i20 N Rally1	Driver, Co-driver, Manufacturer	H
11	(Belgium) Thierry Neuville	(Belgium) Martijn Wydaeghe	(South Korea) Hyundai Shell Mobis WRT	Hyundai i20 N Rally1	Driver, Co-driver, Manufacturer	H
16	(France) Adrien Fourmaux	(France) Alexandre Coria	(South Korea) Hyundai Shell Mobis WRT	Hyundai i20 N Rally1	Driver, Co-driver, Manufacturer	H
18	(Japan) Takamoto Katsuta	(Republic of Ireland) Aaron Johnston	(Japan) Toyota Gazoo Racing WRT	Toyota GR Yaris Rally1	Driver, Co-driver	H
22	(Latvia) Mārtiņš Sesks	(Latvia) Renārs Francis	(United Kingdom) M-Sport Ford WRT	Ford Puma Rally1	Driver, Co-driver	H
33	(United Kingdom) Elfyn Evans	(United Kingdom) Scott Martin	(Japan) Toyota Gazoo Racing WRT	Toyota GR Yaris Rally1	Driver, Co-driver, Manufacturer	H
55	(Republic of Ireland) Josh McErlean	(Republic of Ireland) Eoin Treacy	(United Kingdom) M-Sport Ford WRT	Ford Puma Rally1	Driver, Co-driver, Manufacturer	H
95	(Republic of Ireland) Jon Armstrong	(Republic of Ireland) Shane Byrne	(United Kingdom) M-Sport Ford WRT	Ford Puma Rally1	Driver, Co-driver, Manufacturer	H
99	(Sweden) Oliver Solberg	(United Kingdom) Elliott Edmondson	(Japan) Toyota Gazoo Racing WRT	Toyota GR Yaris Rally1	Driver, Co-driver, Manufacturer	H

Rally2 entries competing in the WRC2 Championship
No.	Driver	Co-Driver	Entrant	Car	Championship eligibility	Tyre
20	(Finland) Roope Korhonen	(Finland) Anssi Viinikka	(Finland) Rautio Motorsport	Toyota GR Yaris Rally2	Challenger Driver, Challenger Co-driver	H
21	(France) Yohan Rossel	(France) Arnaud Dunand	(Italy) Lancia Corse HF	Lancia Ypsilon Rally2 HF Integrale	Driver, Co-driver, Team	H
23	(Estonia) Robert Virves	(Estonia) Jakko Viilo	(Germany) Toksport WRT	Škoda Fabia RS Rally2	Team	H
24	(Italy) Roberto Daprà	(Italy) Luca Guglielmetti	(Italy) Roberto Daprà	Škoda Fabia RS Rally2	Challenger Driver, Challenger Co-driver	H
25	(Bulgaria) Nikolay Gryazin	(Kyrgyzstan) Konstantin Aleksandrov	(Italy) Lancia Corse HF	Lancia Ypsilon Rally2 HF Integrale	Team	H
26	(United Kingdom) Gus Greensmith	(Sweden) Jonas Andersson	(United Kingdom) Gus Greensmith	Toyota GR Yaris Rally2	Driver, Co-driver	H
27	(Finland) Teemu Suninen	(Finland) Janni Hussi	(Finland) Teemu Suninen	Toyota GR Yaris Rally2	Driver, Co-driver	H
28	(Paraguay) Fabrizio Zaldivar	(Italy) Marcelo Der Ohannesian	(Paraguay) Fabrizio Zaldivar	Škoda Fabia RS Rally2	Challenger Driver, Challenger Co-driver	H
29	(Norway) Andreas Mikkelsen	(Norway) Jørn Listerud	(Germany) Toksport WRT	Škoda Fabia RS Rally2	Driver, Co-driver, Team	H
30	(France) Eric Camilli	(France) Thibault de la Haye	(France) Eric Camilli	Škoda Fabia RS Rally2	Driver, Co-driver	H
31	(Spain) Alejandro Cachón	(Spain) Borja Rozada	(Spain) Toyota España	Toyota GR Yaris Rally2	Challenger Driver, Challenger Co-driver	H
32	(Italy) Giovanni Trentin	(Italy) Pietro Elia Ometto	(Italy) MT Racing SRL	Škoda Fabia RS Rally2	Challenger Driver, Challenger Co-driver	H
34	(France) Mattéo Chatillon	(France) Maxence Cornuau	(France) Mattéo Chatillon	Škoda Fabia RS Rally2	Challenger Driver, Challenger Co-driver	H
35	(Estonia) Romet Jürgenson	(Estonia) Siim Oja	(United Kingdom) M-Sport Ford WRT	Ford Fiesta Rally2	Challenger Driver, Challenger Co-driver	H
36	(Spain) Jan Solans	(Spain) Rodrigo Sanjuan de Eusebio	(Spain) PH.Ph	Toyota GR Yaris Rally2	Challenger Driver, Challenger Co-driver	H
37	(Sweden) Mille Johansson	(Sweden) Johan Grönvall	(United Kingdom) M-Sport Ford WRT	Ford Fiesta Rally2	Challenger Driver, Challenger Co-driver	H
39	(France) Pablo Sarrazin	(France) Geoffrey Combe	(France) Pablo Sarrazin	Citroën C3 Rally2	Challenger Driver, Challenger Co-driver	H
40	(France) Eliott Delecour	(France) Sabrina De Castelli	(France) Eliott Delecour	Toyota GR Yaris Rally2	Challenger Driver, Challenger Co-driver	H
41	(France) Tristan Charpentier	(France) Loris Pascaud	(Czech Republic) Orsák Rallysport	Škoda Fabia RS Rally2	Challenger Driver, Challenger Co-driver	H
42	(Mexico) Alejandro Mauro	(Spain) Ariday Bonilla	(Mexico) Alejandro Mauro	Škoda Fabia RS Rally2	Challenger Driver, Challenger Co-driver	H
43	(Australia) Harry Bates	(United Kingdom) Keaton Williams	(Australia) Harry Bates	Toyota GR Yaris Rally2	Challenger Driver, Challenger Co-driver	H
44	(Portugal) Armindo Araújo	(Portugal) Luís Ramalho	(Portugal) Armindo Araújo	Škoda Fabia RS Rally2	Challenger Driver, Challenger Co-driver	H
46	(Spain) Ferrán Jubany	(Spain) Alejandro López	(Spain) Ferrán Jubany	Škoda Fabia RS Rally2	Challenger Driver, Challenger Co-driver	H
48	(Portugal) Pedro Meireles	(Portugal) Mário Castro	(Portugal) Pedro Meireles	Škoda Fabia RS Rally2	Challenger/Master Driver, Challenger/Master Co-driver	H
49	(Portugal) Rúben Rodrigues	(Portugal) Rui Raimundo	(Portugal) Rúben Rodrigues	Toyota GR Yaris Rally2	Challenger Driver, Challenger Co-driver	H
52	(Portugal) Diogo Marujo	(Portugal) Jorge Carvalho	(Portugal) Diogo Marujo	Škoda Fabia Rally2 evo	Challenger Driver, Challenger Co-driver	H
54	(Portugal) Paulo Neto	(Portugal) Carlos Magalhães	(Portugal) Paulo Neto	Škoda Fabia RS Rally2	Challenger Driver, Challenger Co-driver	H
56	(Portugal) Diogo Salvi	(Portugal) Gonçalo Cunha	(Portugal) Diogo Salvi	Škoda Fabia RS Rally2	Challenger/Master Driver, Challenger Co-driver	H
57	(Portugal) Ricardo Filipe	(Portugal) Filipe Carvalho	(Portugal) Ricardo Filipe	Škoda Fabia R5	Challenger Driver, Challenger Co-driver	H
58	(Netherlands) Bernhard ten Brinke	(United Kingdom) Tom Woodburn	(Netherlands) Bernhard ten Brinke	Toyota GR Yaris Rally2	Challenger Driver, Challenger Co-driver	H
59	(France) Adrien Mosca	(France) Julie Amblard	(Finland) Printsport	Toyota GR Yaris Rally2	Challenger Driver, Challenger Co-driver	H
60	(Mexico) Miguel Granados	(Spain) Marc Martí	(Mexico) Miguel Granados	Škoda Fabia RS Rally2	Challenger/Masters Driver, Challenger/Masters Co-driver	H
61	(Portugal) Tiago Silva	(Portugal) Jorge Henriques	(Portugal) Tiago Silva	Škoda Fabia R5	Challenger Driver, Challenger Co-driver	H
62	(Turkey) Uğur Soylu	(Turkey) Sener Güray	(Turkey) GP Garage My Team	Škoda Fabia RS Rally2	Challenger/Masters Driver, Challenger Co-driver	H
63	(Romania) Eugen Cărăgui	(Romania) Robert Patrick Fus	(Romania) Eugen Cărăgui	Citroën C3 Rally2	Challenger Driver, Challenger Co-driver	H
64	(Peru) Jorge Martínez	(Argentina) Marcelo Brizio	(Peru) Jorge Martínez	Hyundai i20 N Rally2	Challenger/Masters Driver, Challenger/Masters Co-driver	H

Rally3 entries competing in the WRC3 Championship and/or the Junior World Rally Championship
No.	Driver	Co-Driver	Entrant	Car	Class eligibility	Tyre
65	(Italy) Matteo Fontana	(Italy) Alessandro Arnaboldi	(Italy) Matteo Fontana	Ford Fiesta Rally3	WRC3	H
66	(France) Eric Royère	(Belgium) Maxime Andernack	(France) Eric Royère	Ford Fiesta Rally3	WRC3	H
67	(Bolivia) Nataniel Bruun	(Spain) Javier Martínez Martínez	(Bolivia) Nataniel Bruun	Ford Fiesta Rally3	WRC3	H
68	(Peru) André Martinez	(Argentina) Matias Aranguren	(Peru) André Martinez	Ford Fiesta Rally3	WRC3	H
69	(Finland) Jarkko Nikara	(Japan) Tomiya Maekawa	(Japan) Toyota Gazoo Racing WRT NG	Renault Clio Rally3	WRC3	H
70	(Sweden) Calle Carlberg	(Norway) Jørgen Eriksen	(Sweden) Calle Carlberg	Ford Fiesta Rally3	Junior WRC	H
71	(Turkey) Ali Türkkan	(Turkey) Oytun Albaykar	(Turkey) Castrol Ford Team Türkiye	Ford Fiesta Rally3	WRC3, Junior WRC	H
72	(Finland) Leevi Lassila	(Finland) Mikko Lukka	(Finland) Leevi Lassila	Ford Fiesta Rally3	Junior WRC	H
73	(Spain) Gil Membrado	(Spain) Adrián Pérez	(Spain) Gil Membrado	Ford Fiesta Rally3	WRC3, Junior WRC	H
74	(Spain) Raúl Hernández	(Spain) José Murado	(Spain) Raúl Hernández	Ford Fiesta Rally3	WRC3, Junior WRC	H
75	(Turkey) Kerem Kazaz	(France) Corentin Silvestre	(Turkey) Team Petrol Ofisi	Ford Fiesta Rally3	WRC3, Junior WRC	H
76	(Republic of Ireland) Craig Rahill	(Republic of Ireland) Conor Smith	(Republic of Ireland) Motorsport Ireland Rally Academy	Ford Fiesta Rally3	Junior WRC	H

Other major entries
No.	Driver	Co-Driver	Entrant	Car	Tyre
38	(Japan) Yuki Yamamoto	(Republic of Ireland) James Fulton	(Finland) Printsport	Toyota GR Yaris Rally2	H
45	(Portugal) José Pedro Fontes	(Portugal) Inês Ponte	(Portugal) José Pedro Fontes	Lancia Ypsilon Rally2 HF Integrale	H
47	(Portugal) Ricardo Teodósio	(Portugal) José Teixeira	(Portugal) Ricardo Teodósio	Citroën C3 Rally2	H
50	(Portugal) Gonçalo Henriques	(Portugal) Inês Veiga	(Portugal) Gonçalo Henriques	Hyundai i20 N Rally2	H
51	(Portugal) Pedro Almeida	(Portugal) António Costa	(Portugal) Pedro Almeida	Škoda Fabia RS Rally2	H
53	(Portugal) Hugo Lopes	(Portugal) Magda Oliveira	(Portugal) Hugo Lopes	Hyundai i20 N Rally2	H

=== Itinerary ===
All dates and times are in WEST (UTC+1).

Date	No.	Time span	Stage name	Distance
6 May	—	After 8:01	Baltar [Shakedown]	5.72 km
7 May		After 14:00	Opening ceremony, Coimbra	—N/a
7 May	SS1	After 15:05	Águeda / Sever	15.08 km
7 May	SS2	After 16:05	Sever / Albergaria	20.24 km
7 May	SS3	After 18:05	SSS Figueira da Foz	2.10 km
7 May		18:18 – 18:33	Tyre fitting zone, Figueira da Foz	—N/a
8 May	SS4	After 7:05	Mortágua 1	14.59 km
8 May	SS5	After 8:55	Arganil 1	20.24 km
8 May	SS6	After 10:13	Lousã 1	7.07 km
8 May		11:27 – 11:47	Regroup, Arganil	—N/a
8 May		11:47 – 12:07	Remote service, Arganil	—N/a
8 May	SS7	After 12:25	Arganil 2	20.24 km
8 May	SS8	After 13:20	Góis	15.50 km
8 May	SS9	After 14:03	Lousã 2	7.07 km
8 May	SS10	After 15:40	Mortágua 2	14.59 km
8 May		18:10 – 18:58	Flexi service A, Exponor	—N/a
9 May	SS11	After 7:05	Felgueiras 1	8.81 km
9 May	SS12	After 8:05	Cabeceiras de Basto 1	19.91 km
9 May	SS13	After 9:35	Amarante 1	25.95 km
9 May	SS14	After 11:05	Paredes 1	16.09 km
9 May		12:00 – 12:30	Regroup, Exponor	—N/a
9 May		12:30 – 13:03	Service B, Exponor	—N/a
9 May	SS15	After 14:05	Felgueiras 2	8.81 km
9 May	SS16	After 15:05	Cabeceiras de Basto 2	19.91 km
9 May	SS17	After 16:35	Amarante 2	25.95 km
9 May	SS18	After 18:05	Paredes 2	16.09 km
9 May	SS19	After 19:05	SSS Lousada	3.52 km
9 May		20:10 – 20:58	Flexi service C, Exponor	—N/a
10 May	SS20	After 8:05	Vieira do Minho 1	21.72 km
10 May	SS21	After 9:35	Fafe 1	11.18 km
10 May	SS22	After 10:35	Vieira do Minho 2	21.72 km
10 May		11:55 – 12:50	Regroup, Fafe	—N/a
10 May	SS23	After 13:15	Fafe 2 [Power Stage]	11.18 km
10 May		After 14:15	Podium ceremony, Fafe	—N/a
10 May		After 15:05	Finish, Exponor	—N/a

== Report ==
=== WRC Rally1 ===
==== Classification ====
Position		No.	Driver	Co-driver	Entrant	Car	Time	Difference	Points			
Event	Class	No.	Driver	Co-driver	Entrant	Car	Time	Difference	Event	Sunday	Stage	Total
1	1	11	Thierry Neuville	Martijn Wydaeghe	Hyundai Shell Mobis WRT	Hyundai i20 N Rally1	3:53:01.7	0.0	25	1	4	30
2	2	99	Oliver Solberg	Elliott Edmondson	Toyota Gazoo Racing WRT	Toyota GR Yaris Rally1	3:53:18.0	+16.3	17	5	2	24
3	3	33	Elfyn Evans	Scott Martin	Toyota Gazoo Racing WRT	Toyota GR Yaris Rally1	3:53:30.8	+29.1	15	4	3	22
4	4	16	Adrien Fourmaux	Alexandre Coria	Hyundai Shell Mobis WRT	Hyundai i20 N Rally1	3:53:56.5	+54.8	12	3	5	20
5	5	18	Takamoto Katsuta	Aaron Johnston	Toyota Gazoo Racing WRT	Toyota GR Yaris Rally1	3:54:14.3	+1:12.6	10	2	0	12
6	6	1	Sébastien Ogier	Vincent Landais	Toyota Gazoo Racing WRT	Toyota GR Yaris Rally1	3:54:28.3	+1:26.6	8	0	1	9
7	7	5	Sami Pajari	Marko Salminen	Toyota Gazoo Racing WRT2	Toyota GR Yaris Rally1	3:55:52.6	+2:50.9	6	0	0	6
8	8	6	Dani Sordo	Cándido Carrera	Hyundai Shell Mobis WRT	Hyundai i20 N Rally1	3:57:11.7	+4:10.0	4	0	0	4
9	9	22	Mārtiņš Sesks	Renārs Francis	M-Sport Ford WRT	Ford Puma Rally1	3:59:50.9	+6:49.2	2	0	0	2
18	10	55	Josh McErlean	Eoin Treacy	M-Sport Ford WRT	Ford Puma Rally1	4:13:09.6	+20:07.9	0	0	0	0
Retired SS15		95	Jon Armstrong	Shane Byrne	M-Sport Ford WRT	Ford Puma Rally1	Accident		0	0	0	0

==== Special stages ====
Stage	Winners	Car	Time	Class leaders
SD	Neuville / Wydaeghe	Hyundai i20 N Rally1	3:51.2	—N/a
SS1	Fourmaux / Coria	Hyundai i20 N Rally1	11:06.6	Fourmaux / Coria
SS2	Solberg / Edmondson	Toyota GR Yaris Rally1	15:13.2	Solberg / Edmondson
SS3	Evans / Martin	Toyota GR Yaris Rally1	1:39.3	Solberg / Edmondson
SS3	Ogier / Landais	Toyota GR Yaris Rally1	1:39.3	Solberg / Edmondson
SS4	Pajari / Salminen	Toyota GR Yaris Rally1	9:12.6	Fourmaux / Coria
SS5	Pajari / Salminen	Toyota GR Yaris Rally1	12:28.5	Fourmaux / Coria
SS6	Neuville / Wydaeghe	Hyundai i20 N Rally1	4:32.5	Fourmaux / Coria
SS7	Ogier / Landais	Toyota GR Yaris Rally1	11:22.8	Fourmaux / Coria
SS8	Ogier / Landais	Toyota GR Yaris Rally1	9:53.5	Ogier / Landais
SS9	Ogier / Landais	Toyota GR Yaris Rally1	4:30.3	Ogier / Landais
SS10	Neuville / Wydaeghe	Hyundai i20 N Rally1	9:10.1	Ogier / Landais
SS11	Pajari / Salminen	Toyota GR Yaris Rally1	5:45.5	Ogier / Landais
SS12	Fourmaux / Coria	Hyundai i20 N Rally1	13:03.5	Ogier / Landais
SS13	Solberg / Edmondson	Toyota GR Yaris Rally1	16:42.3	Ogier / Landais
SS14	Solberg / Edmondson	Toyota GR Yaris Rally1	11:53.2	Solberg / Edmondson
SS15	Ogier / Landais	Toyota GR Yaris Rally1	5:44.4	Ogier / Landais
SS16	Fourmaux / Coria	Hyundai i20 N Rally1	13:04.2	Ogier / Landais
SS17	Ogier / Landais	Toyota GR Yaris Rally1	18:20.1	Ogier / Landais
SS18	Ogier / Landais	Toyota GR Yaris Rally1	12:34.1	Ogier / Landais
SS19	Solberg / Edmondson	Toyota GR Yaris Rally1	3:07.2	Ogier / Landais
SS20	Evans / Martin	Toyota GR Yaris Rally1	14:12.0	Ogier / Landais
SS21	McErlean / Treacy	Ford Puma Rally1	7:19.8	Ogier / Landais
SS22	Fourmaux / Coria	Hyundai i20 N Rally1	14:32.8	Neuville / Wydaeghe
SS23	Fourmaux / Coria	Hyundai i20 N Rally1	6:52.1	Neuville / Wydaeghe

==== Championship standings ====
Drivers' Standings
Move	Pos.	Driver	Points
	1	Elfyn Evans	123
	2	Takamoto Katsuta	111
1	3	Oliver Solberg	92
1	4	Adrien Fourmaux	79
2	5	Sami Pajari	78

Co-drivers' Standings
Move	Pos.	Driver	Points
	1	Scott Martin	123
	2	Aaron Johnston	111
1	3	Elliott Edmondson	92
1	4	Alexandre Coria	79
2	5	Marko Salminen	78

Manufacturers' Standings
Move	Pos.	Driver	Points
	1	Toyota Gazoo Racing WRT	311
	2	Hyundai Shell Mobis WRT	218
	3	Toyota Gazoo Racing WRT2	86
	4	M-Sport Ford WRT	75

=== WRC2 Rally2 ===
==== Classification ====
Position		No.	Driver	Co-driver	Entrant	Car	Time	Difference	Points	
Event	Class	No.	Driver	Co-driver	Entrant	Car	Time	Difference	Class	Event
10	1	27	Teemu Suninen	Janni Hussi	Teemu Suninen	Toyota GR Yaris Rally2	4:04:15.5	0.0	25	1
12	2	20	Roope Korhonen	Anssi Viinikka	Rautio Motorsport	Toyota GR Yaris Rally2	4:05:01.1	+45.6	17	0
13	3	29	Andreas Mikkelsen	Jørn Listerud	Toksport WRT	Škoda Fabia RS Rally2	4:05:29.7	+1:14.2	15	0
14	4	36	Jan Solans	Rodrigo Sanjuan de Eusebio	PH.Ph	Toyota GR Yaris Rally2	4:07:02.5	+2:47.0	12	0
15	5	28	Fabrizio Zaldivar	Marcelo Der Ohannesian	Fabrizio Zaldivar	Škoda Fabia RS Rally2	4:09:20.2	+5:04.7	10	0
16	6	37	Mille Johansson	Johan Grönvall	M-Sport Ford WRT	Ford Fiesta Rally2	4:09:33.3	+5:17.8	8	0
17	7	30	Eric Camilli	Thibault de la Haye	Eric Camilli	Škoda Fabia RS Rally2	4:10:29.3	+6:13.8	6	0
20	8	34	Mattéo Chatillon	Maxence Cornuau	Mattéo Chatillon	Škoda Fabia RS Rally2	4:17:06.8	+12:51.3	4	0
21	9	58	Bernhard ten Brinke	Tom Woodburn	Bernhard ten Brinke	Toyota GR Yaris Rally2	4:19:28.4	+15:12.9	2	0
22	10	26	Gus Greensmith	Jonas Andersson	Gus Greensmith	Toyota GR Yaris Rally2	4:20:33.0	+16:17.5	1	0
23	11	35	Romet Jürgenson	Siim Oja	M-Sport Ford WRT	Ford Fiesta Rally2	4:21:11.1	+16:55.6	0	0
24	12	44	Armindo Araújo	Luís Ramalho	Armindo Araújo	Škoda Fabia RS Rally2	4:22:55.4	+18:39.9	0	0
27	13	24	Roberto Daprà	Luca Guglielmetti	Roberto Daprà	Škoda Fabia RS Rally2	4:27:38.9	+23:23.4	0	0
29	14	46	Ferrán Jubany	Alejandro López	Ferrán Jubany	Škoda Fabia RS Rally2	4:32:27.6	+28:12.1	0	0
30	15	54	Paulo Neto	Carlos Magalhães	Paulo Neto	Škoda Fabia RS Rally2	4:34:16.8	+30:01.3	0	0
33	16	32	Giovanni Trentin	Pietro Elia Ometto	Giovanni Trentin	Škoda Fabia RS Rally2	4:37:43.6	+33:28.1	0	0
36	17	39	Pablo Sarrazin	Geoffrey Combe	Pablo Sarrazin	Citroën C3 Rally2	4:40:50.3	+36:34.8	0	0
38	18	21	Yohan Rossel	Arnaud Dunand	Lancia HF Corse	Lancia Ypsilon Rally2 HF Integrale	4:45:16.7	+41:01.2	0	0
40	19	61	Tiago Silva	Jorge Henriques	Tiago Silva	Škoda Fabia R5	4:47:01.0	+42:45.5	0	0
42	20	43	Harry Bates	Keaton Williams	Harry Bates	Toyota GR Yaris Rally2	4:59:48.2	+55:32.7	0	0
43	21	59	Adrien Mosca	Julie Amblard	Adrien Mosca	Toyota GR Yaris Rally2	5:14:41.7	+1:10:26.2	0	0
Retired SS22		41	Tristan Charpentier	Loris Pascaud	Orsák Rallysport	Škoda Fabia RS Rally2	Accident		0	0
Retired SS21		57	Ricardo Filipe	Filipe Carvalho	Ricardo Filipe	Škoda Fabia R5	Mechanical		0	0
Retired SS21		62	Uğur Soylu	Sener Güray	GP Garage My Team	Škoda Fabia RS Rally2	Stuck in ditch		0	0
Retired SS20		64	Jorge Martínez	Marcelo Brizio	Jorge Martínez	Hyundai i20 N Rally2	Accident		0	0
Retired SS19		52	Diogo Marujo	Jorge Carvalho	Diogo Marujo	Škoda Fabia Rally2 evo	Accident		0	0
Retired SS17		31	Alejandro Cachón	Borja Rozada	Toyota España	Toyota GR Yaris Rally2	Mechanical		0	0
Retired SS15		40	Eliott Delecour	Sabrina De Castelli	Eliott Delecour	Toyota GR Yaris Rally2	Accident		0	0
Retired SS15		56	Diogo Salvi	Gonçalo Cunha	Diogo Salvi	Škoda Fabia RS Rally2	Mechanical		0	0
Retired SS11		63	Eugen Cărăgui	Robert Patrick Fus	Eugen Cărăgui	Citroën C3 Rally2	Medical reasons		0	0

==== Special stages ====
Overall
Stage	Winners	Car	Time	Class leaders
SD	Suninen / Hussi	Toyota GR Yaris Rally2	4:02.0	—N/a
SS1	Suninen / Hussi	Toyota GR Yaris Rally2	11:30.1	Suninen / Hussi
SS2	Solans / Sanjuan	Skoda Fabia RS Rally2	15:43.0	Solans / Sanjuan
SS3	Mikkelsen / Listerund	Skoda Fabia RS Rally2	1:42.5	Solans / Sanjuan
SS4	Suninen / Hussi	Toyota GR Yaris Rally2	9:45.5	Solans / Sanjuan
SS5	Suninen / Hussi	Toyota GR Yaris Rally2	12:13.4	Suninen / Hussi
SS6	Rossel / Dunand	Lancia Ypsilon Rally2 HF Integrale	4:46.1	Cachón / Rozada
SS7	Stage cancelled			
SS8	Solans / Sanjuan	Skoda Fabia RS Rally2	10:20.5	Solans / Sanjuan
SS9	Solans / Sanjuan	Skoda Fabia RS Rally2	4:40.8	Solans / Sanjuan
SS10	Korhonen / Viinikka	Toyota GR Yaris Rally2	9:37.8	Solans / Sanjuan
SS11	Suninen / Hussi	Toyota GR Yaris Rally2	6:06.6	Solans / Sanjuan
SS12	Greensmith / Andersson	Toyota GR Yaris Rally2	13:48.7	Solans / Sanjuan
SS13	Suninen / Hussi	Toyota GR Yaris Rally2	17:29.0	Suninen / Hussi
SS14	Greensmith / Andersson	Toyota GR Yaris Rally2	12:08.7	Suninen / Hussi
SS15	Korhonen / Viinikka	Toyota GR Yaris Rally2	6:00.3	Suninen / Hussi
SS16	Korhonen / Viinikka	Toyota GR Yaris Rally2	13:47.9	Suninen / Hussi
SS17	Solans / Sanjuan	Skoda Fabia RS Rally2	18:57.9	Suninen / Hussi
SS18	Solans / Sanjuan	Skoda Fabia RS Rally2	12:58.4	Solans / Sanjuan
SS19	Suninen / Hussi	Toyota GR Yaris Rally2	3:19.4	Suninen / Hussi
SS20	Suninen / Hussi	Toyota GR Yaris Rally2	14:53.5	Suninen / Hussi
SS21	Jürgenson / Oja	Ford Fiesta Rally2	7:21.2	Suninen / Hussi
SS22	Korhonen / Viinikka	Toyota GR Yaris Rally2	15:25.5	Suninen / Hussi
SS23	Rossel / Dunand	Lancia Ypsilon Rally2 HF Integrale	7:21.6	Suninen / Hussi

Challenger
Stage	Winners	Car	Time	Class leaders
SD	Daprà / Guglielmetti	Skoda Fabia RS Rally2	4:04.1	—N/a
SS1	Solans / Sanjuan	Skoda Fabia RS Rally2	11:33.7	Solans / Sanjuan
SS2	Solans / Sanjuan	Skoda Fabia RS Rally2	15:43.0	Solans / Sanjuan
SS3	Cachón / Rozada	Toyota GR Yaris Rally2	1:43.1	Solans / Sanjuan
SS4	Korhonen / Viinikka	Toyota GR Yaris Rally2	9:48.7	Solans / Sanjuan
SS5	Cachón / Rozada	Toyota GR Yaris Rally2	12:17.4	Solans / Sanjuan
SS6	Daprà / Guglielmetti	Skoda Fabia RS Rally2	4:47.2	Cachón / Rozada
SS7	Stage cancelled			
SS8	Solans / Sanjuan	Skoda Fabia RS Rally2	10:20.5	Solans / Sanjuan
SS9	Solans / Sanjuan	Skoda Fabia RS Rally2	4:40.8	Solans / Sanjuan
SS10	Korhonen / Viinikka	Toyota GR Yaris Rally2	9:37.8	Solans / Sanjuan
SS11	Zaldivar / Der Ohannesian	Škoda Fabia RS Rally2	6:08.4	Solans / Sanjuan
SS12	Solans / Sanjuan	Skoda Fabia RS Rally2	13:50.4	Solans / Sanjuan
SS13	Solans / Sanjuan	Skoda Fabia RS Rally2	17:38.8	Solans / Sanjuan
SS14	Cachón / Rozada	Toyota GR Yaris Rally2	12:18.1	Solans / Sanjuan
SS15	Korhonen / Viinikka	Toyota GR Yaris Rally2	6:00.3	Solans / Sanjuan
SS16	Korhonen / Viinikka	Toyota GR Yaris Rally2	13:47.9	Solans / Sanjuan
SS17	Solans / Sanjuan	Skoda Fabia RS Rally2	18:57.9	Solans / Sanjuan
SS18	Solans / Sanjuan	Skoda Fabia RS Rally2	12:58.4	Solans / Sanjuan
SS19	Zaldivar / Der Ohannesian	Škoda Fabia RS Rally2	3:19.8	Solans / Sanjuan
SS20	Solans / Sanjuan	Skoda Fabia RS Rally2	15:04.1	Solans / Sanjuan
SS21	Jürgenson / Oja	Ford Fiesta Rally2	7:21.2	Solans / Sanjuan
SS22	Korhonen / Viinikka	Toyota GR Yaris Rally2	15:25.5	Korhonen / Viinikka
SS23	Bates / Williams	Toyota GR Yaris Rally2	7:24.2	Korhonen / Viinikka

==== Championship standings ====
Drivers' Standings
Move	Pos.	Driver	Points
	1	Yohan Rossel	52
	2	Léo Rossel	52
1	3	Roope Korhonen	52
5	4	Teemu Suninen	42
2	5	Roberto Daprà	37

Co-drivers' Standings
Move	Pos.	Driver	Points
	1	Arnaud Dunand	52
	2	Guillaume Mercoiret	52
1	3	Anssi Viinikka	52
4	4	Janni Hussi	42
2	5	Luca Guglielmetti	37

Manufacturers' Standings
Move	Pos.	Driver	Points
	1	Lancia Corse HF	163
	2	Toksport WRT	126
	3	M-Sport Ford WRT	45

Challenger Drivers' Standings
Move	Pos.	Driver	Points
	1	Léo Rossel	65
3	2	Roope Korhonen	62
1	3	Roberto Daprà	46
1	4	Alejandro Cachón	40
1	5	Nikolay Gryazin	39

Challenger Co-drivers' Standings
Move	Pos.	Driver	Points
	1	Guillaume Mercoiret	67
2	2	Anssi Viinikka	65
1	3	Luca Guglielmetti	56
1	4	Konstantin Aleksandrov	42
7	5	Marcelo Der Ohannesian	32

=== WRC3 Rally3 ===
==== Classification ====
Position		No.	Driver	Co-driver	Entrant	Car	Time	Difference	Points
Event	Class	No.	Driver	Co-driver	Entrant	Car	Time	Difference	Points
25	1	65	Matteo Fontana	Alessandro Arnaboldi	Matteo Fontana	Ford Fiesta Rally3	4:23:26.8	0.0	25
26	2	71	Ali Türkkan	Oytun Albaykar	Castrol Ford Team Türkiye	Ford Fiesta Rally3	4:24:45.4	+1:18.6	17
31	3	68	André Martinez	Matias Aranguren	André Martinez	Ford Fiesta Rally3	4:35:42.2	+12:15.4	15
34	4	73	Gil Membrado	Adrián Pérez	Gil Membrado	Ford Fiesta Rally3	4:39:39.3	+16:12.5	12
37	5	74	Raúl Hernández	José Murado	Raúl Hernández	Ford Fiesta Rally3	4:41:32.4	+18:05.6	10
39	6	66	Eric Royère	Maxime Andernack	Eric Royère	Ford Fiesta Rally3	4:46:53.5	+23:26.7	8
46	7	69	Jarkko Nikara	Tomiya Maekawa	Toyota Gazoo Racing WRT NG	Renault Clio Rally3	6:04:48.3	+1:41:21.5	6
Retired SS23		75	Kerem Kazaz	Corentin Silvestre	Team Petrol Ofisi	Ford Fiesta Rally3	Mechanical		0

==== Special stages ====
Stage	Winners	Car	Time	Class leaders
SD	Fontana / Arnaboldi	Ford Fiesta Rally3	4:16.4	—N/a
SS1	Türkkan / Albayrak	Ford Fiesta Rally3	12:10.4	Türkkan / Albayrak
SS2	Stage cancelled			
SS3	Fontana / Arnaboldi	Ford Fiesta Rally3	1:47.3	Türkkan / Albayrak
SS4	Türkkan / Albayrak	Ford Fiesta Rally3	10:21.2	Türkkan / Albayrak
SS5	Türkkan / Albayrak	Ford Fiesta Rally3	12:55.4	Türkkan / Albayrak
SS6	Fontana / Arnaboldi	Ford Fiesta Rally3	5:00.1	Türkkan / Albayrak
SS7	Stage cancelled			
SS8	Membrado / Pérez	Ford Fiesta Rally3	10:52.8	Türkkan / Albayrak
SS9	Türkkan / Albayrak	Ford Fiesta Rally3	4:56.7	Türkkan / Albayrak
SS10	Fontana / Arnaboldi	Ford Fiesta Rally3	10:12.5	Fontana / Arnaboldi
SS11	Fontana / Arnaboldi	Ford Fiesta Rally3	6:24.9	Fontana / Arnaboldi
SS12	Türkkan / Albayrak	Ford Fiesta Rally3	14:35.4	Fontana / Arnaboldi
SS13	Türkkan / Albayrak	Ford Fiesta Rally3	18:28.6	Fontana / Arnaboldi
SS14	Nikara / Maekawa	Renault Clio Rally3	12:39.3	Türkkan / Albayrak
SS15	Fontana / Arnaboldi	Ford Fiesta Rally3	7:07.1	Türkkan / Albayrak
SS16	Nikara / Maekawa	Renault Clio Rally3	16:48.6	Membrado / Pérez
SS17	Fontana / Arnaboldi	Ford Fiesta Rally3	20:16.2	Membrado / Pérez
SS18	Membrado / Pérez	Ford Fiesta Rally3	14:28.4	Membrado / Pérez
SS19	Membrado / Pérez	Ford Fiesta Rally3	3:35.8	Membrado / Pérez
SS20	Fontana / Arnaboldi	Ford Fiesta Rally3	15:51.4	Membrado / Pérez
SS21	Fontana / Arnaboldi	Ford Fiesta Rally3	7:38.9	Membrado / Pérez
SS22	Nikara / Maekawa	Renault Clio Rally3	16:08.1	Fontana / Arnaboldi
SS23	Hernández / Murado	Ford Fiesta Rally3	7:45.4	Fontana / Arnaboldi

==== Championship standings ====
Drivers' Standings
Move	Pos.	Driver	Points
1	1	Matteo Fontana	75
1	2	Gil Membrado	66
5	3	Ali Türkkan	46
1	4	Raúl Hernández	45
	5	Eric Royère	41

Co-drivers' Standings
Move	Pos.	Driver	Points
1	1	Alessandro Arnaboldi	75
1	2	Adrián Pérez	66
5	3	Oytun Albayrak	46
1	4	José Murado	45
	5	Alexis Grenier	41

=== Junior WRC Rally3 ===
==== Classification ====
Position		No.	Driver	Co-driver	Entrant	Car	Time	Difference	Points	
Event	Class	No.	Driver	Co-driver	Entrant	Car	Time	Difference	Class	Stage
26	1	71	Ali Türkkan	Oytun Albaykar	Castrol Ford Team Türkiye	Ford Fiesta Rally3	4:24:45.4	0.0	25	6
28	2	72	Leevi Lassila	Mikko Lukka	Leevi Lassila	Ford Fiesta Rally3	4:28:17.0	+3:31.6	17	0
34	3	73	Gil Membrado	Adrián Pérez	Gil Membrado	Ford Fiesta Rally3	4:39:39.3	+4:53.9	15	5
37	4	74	Raúl Hernández	José Murado	Raúl Hernández	Ford Fiesta Rally3	4:41:32.4	+16:47.0	12	1
45	5	76	Craig Rahill	Conor Smith	Motorsport Ireland Rally Academy	Ford Fiesta Rally3	5:41:14.0	+1:16:28.6	10	0
Retired SS23		75	Kerem Kazaz	Corentin Silvestre	Team Petrol Ofisi	Ford Fiesta Rally3	Mechanical		0	1
Retired SS22		70	Calle Carlberg	Jørgen Eriksen	Calle Carlberg	Ford Fiesta Rally3	Accident		0	8

==== Special stages ====
Stage	Winners	Car	Time	Class leaders
SD	Türkkan / Albayrak	Ford Fiesta Rally3	4:17.3	—N/a
SS1	Türkkan / Albayrak	Ford Fiesta Rally3	12:10.4	Türkkan / Albayrak
SS2	Stage cancelled			
SS3	Türkkan / Albayrak	Ford Fiesta Rally3	1:48.2	Türkkan / Albayrak
SS4	Carlberg / Eriksen	Ford Fiesta Rally3	10:14.9	Türkkan / Albayrak
SS5	Carlberg / Eriksen	Ford Fiesta Rally3	12:48.2	Türkkan / Albayrak
SS6	Carlberg / Eriksen	Ford Fiesta Rally3	5:00.7	Carlberg / Eriksen
SS7	Stage cancelled			
SS8	Membrado / Pérez	Ford Fiesta Rally3	10:52.8	Carlberg / Eriksen
SS9	Türkkan / Albayrak	Ford Fiesta Rally3	4:56.7	Carlberg / Eriksen
SS10	Carlberg / Eriksen	Ford Fiesta Rally3	10:17.9	Carlberg / Eriksen
SS11	Türkkan / Albayrak	Ford Fiesta Rally3	6:27.6	Carlberg / Eriksen
SS12	Türkkan / Albayrak	Ford Fiesta Rally3	14:35.4	Carlberg / Eriksen
SS13	Türkkan / Albayrak	Ford Fiesta Rally3	18:28.6	Türkkan / Albayrak
SS14	Carlberg / Eriksen	Ford Fiesta Rally3	12:36.3	Carlberg / Eriksen
SS15	Carlberg / Eriksen	Ford Fiesta Rally3	7:23.1	Carlberg / Eriksen
SS16	Carlberg / Eriksen	Ford Fiesta Rally3	17:02.2	Carlberg / Eriksen
SS17	Membrado / Pérez	Ford Fiesta Rally3	20:24.0	Carlberg / Eriksen
SS18	Membrado / Pérez	Ford Fiesta Rally3	14:28.4	Carlberg / Eriksen
SS19	Membrado / Pérez	Ford Fiesta Rally3	3:35.8	Carlberg / Eriksen
SS20	Membrado / Pérez	Ford Fiesta Rally3	15:56.3	Carlberg / Eriksen
SS21	Carlberg / Eriksen	Ford Fiesta Rally3	7:36.9	Carlberg / Eriksen
SS22	Kazaz / Silvestre	Ford Fiesta Rally3	16:26.0	Türkkan / Albayrak
SS23	Hernández / Murado	Ford Fiesta Rally3	7:45.4	Türkkan / Albayrak

==== Championship standings ====
Drivers' Standings
Move	Pos.	Driver	Points
	1	Calle Carlberg	76
	2	Ali Türkkan	74
1	3	Gil Membrado	44
1	4	Leevi Lassila	41
	5	Raúl Hernández	36

Co-drivers' Standings
Move	Pos.	Driver	Points
	1	Jørgen Eriksen	76
	2	Oytun Albaykar	74
1	3	Adrián Pérez	44
1	4	Mikko Lukka	41
	5	José Murado	36

Previous rally: 2026 Rally Islas Canarias	2026 FIA World Rally Championship	Next rally: 2026 Rally Japan
Previous rally: 2025 Rally de Portugal	2026 Rally de Portugal	Next rally: 2027 Rally de Portugal
