= 2025 Rally Chile =

4th edition of the Rally Chile

2025 Rally Chile Rally Chile BIOBÍO 2025
Round 11 of 14 in the 2025 World Rally Championship
← Previous event	Next event →
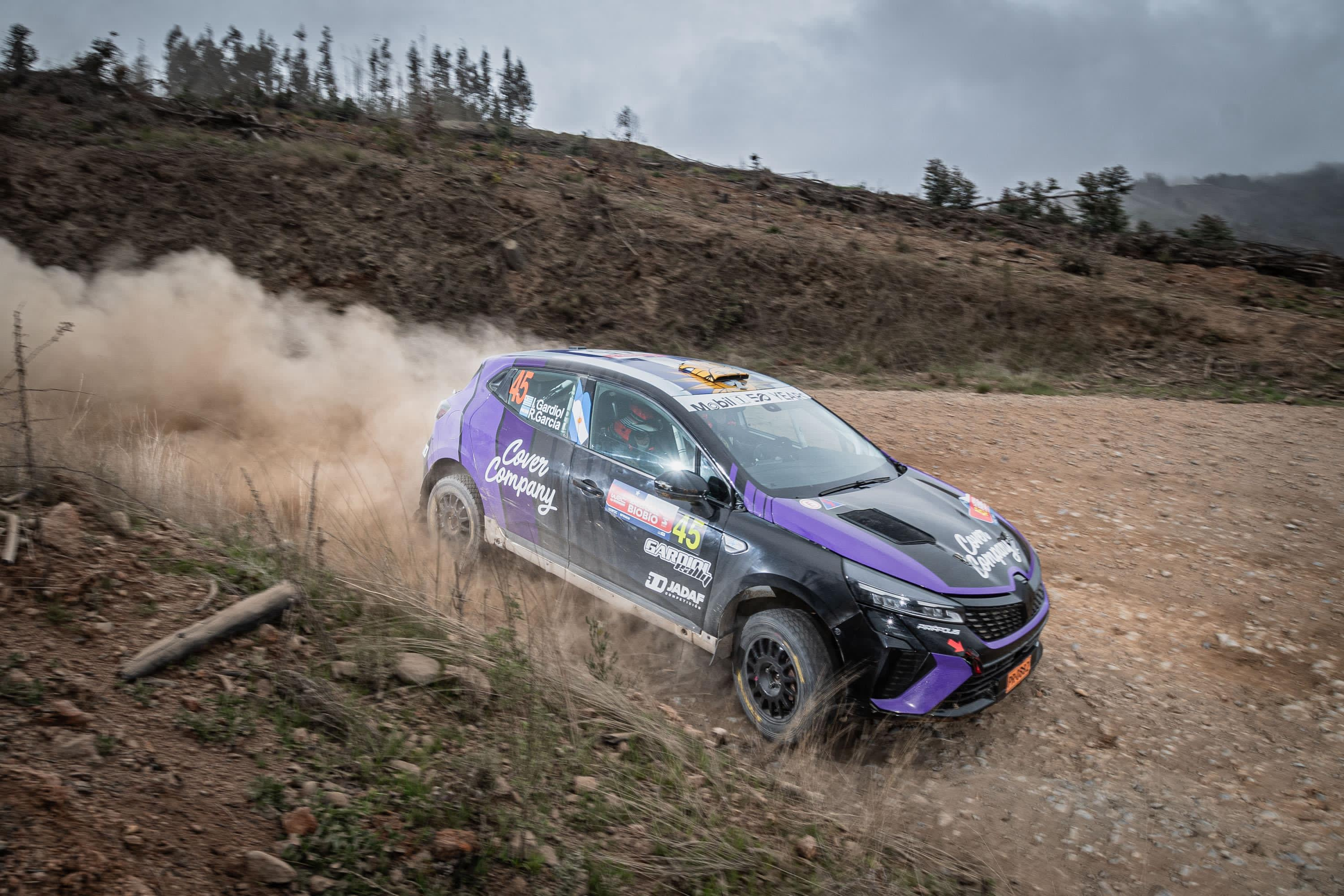
- The rally features smooth and well-built roads but requires demand precision.
- Host country: Chile
- Rally base: Concepción, Biobío
- Dates run: 11 – 14 September 2025
- Start location: Coronel, Biobío
- Finish location: Concepción, Biobío
- Stages: 16 (306.76 km; 190.61 miles)
- Stage surface: Gravel
- Transport distance: 932.87 km (579.66 miles)
- Overall distance: 1,239.63 km (770.27 miles)

Statistics
- Crews registered: 49
- Crews: 46 at start, 39 at finish

Overall results
- Overall winner: (France) Sébastien Ogier (France) Vincent Landais (Japan) Toyota Gazoo Racing WRT; 2:55:42.1
- Sunday Accumulated leader: (France) Sébastien Ogier (France) Vincent Landais (Japan) Toyota Gazoo Racing WRT; 32:28.2
- Power Stage winner: (France) Sébastien Ogier (France) Vincent Landais (Japan) Toyota Gazoo Racing WRT; 4:25.6

Support category results
- WRC-2 winner: (Sweden) Oliver Solberg (United Kingdom) Elliott Edmondson (Finland) Printsport; 3:04:00.7
- WRC-3 winner: (Italy) Matteo Fontana (Italy) Alessandro Arnaboldi; 3:21:07.2

The 2025 Rally Chile (also known as the Rally Chile BIOBÍO 2025) was a motor racing event for rally cars scheduled to be held over four days from 11 to 14 September 2025. It marked the fourth running of the Rally Chile, and was the eleventh round of the 2025 World Rally Championship, 2025 WRC2 Championship and 2025 WRC3 Championship. The 2025 event was based in Concepción, Biobío and was contested over sixteen special stages, covering a total competitive distance of 306.76 km (190.61 mi).

Kalle Rovanperä and Jonne Halttunen were the defending rally winners, and their team, Toyota Gazoo Racing WRT, were the defending manufacturer's winners. Yohan Rossel and Florian Barral were the defending rally winners in the WRC2 category. Diego Dominguez Jr. and Rogelio Peñate were the defending rally winners in the WRC3 category.

Sébastien Ogier and Vincent Landais won the rally, and their team, Toyota Gazoo Racing WRT, were the manufacturer's winner. Oliver Solberg and Elliott Edmondson were the winners in the WRC2 category, and secured their category titles. Matteo Fontana and Alessandro Arnaboldi were the winners in the WRC3 category.

== Background ==
=== Entry list ===
The following crews entered into the rally. The event was opened to crews competing in the World Rally Championship, its support categories, the WRC2 Championship, the WRC3 Championship and privateer entries that were not registered to score points in any championship. Eleven entered under Rally1 regulations, as were nineteen Rally2 crews in the WRC2 Championship and twelve Rally3 crew in the WRC3 Championship.

Rally1 entries competing in the World Rally Championship
No.	Driver	Co-Driver	Entrant	Car	Championship eligibility	Tyre
1	(Belgium) Thierry Neuville	(Belgium) Martijn Wydaeghe	(South Korea) Hyundai Shell Mobis WRT	Hyundai i20 N Rally1	Driver, Co-driver, Manufacturer	H
5	(Finland) Sami Pajari	(Finland) Marko Salminen	(Japan) Toyota Gazoo Racing WRT2	Toyota GR Yaris Rally1	Driver, Co-driver, Manufacturer, Team	H
8	(Estonia) Ott Tänak	(Estonia) Martin Järveoja	(South Korea) Hyundai Shell Mobis WRT	Hyundai i20 N Rally1	Driver, Co-driver, Manufacturer	H
13	(Luxembourg) Grégoire Munster	(Belgium) Louis Louka	(United Kingdom) M-Sport Ford WRT	Ford Puma Rally1	Driver, Co-driver, Manufacturer	H
16	(France) Adrien Fourmaux	(France) Alexandre Coria	(South Korea) Hyundai Shell Mobis WRT	Hyundai i20 N Rally1	Driver, Co-driver, Manufacturer	H
17	(France) Sébastien Ogier	(France) Vincent Landais	(Japan) Toyota Gazoo Racing WRT	Toyota GR Yaris Rally1	Driver, Co-driver, Manufacturer	H
18	(Japan) Takamoto Katsuta	(Republic of Ireland) Aaron Johnston	(Japan) Toyota Gazoo Racing WRT	Toyota GR Yaris Rally1	Driver, Co-driver	H
28	(Chile) Alberto Heller	(Argentina) Luis Allende	(United Kingdom) M-Sport Ford WRT	Ford Puma Rally1	Driver, Co-driver	H
33	(United Kingdom) Elfyn Evans	(United Kingdom) Scott Martin	(Japan) Toyota Gazoo Racing WRT	Toyota GR Yaris Rally1	Driver, Co-driver, Manufacturer	H
55	(Republic of Ireland) Josh McErlean	(Republic of Ireland) Eoin Treacy	(United Kingdom) M-Sport Ford WRT	Ford Puma Rally1	Driver, Co-driver, Manufacturer	H
69	(Finland) Kalle Rovanperä	(Finland) Jonne Halttunen	(Japan) Toyota Gazoo Racing WRT	Toyota GR Yaris Rally1	Driver, Co-driver, Manufacturer	H

Rally2 entries competing in the WRC2 Championship
No.	Driver	Co-Driver	Entrant	Car	Championship eligibility	Tyre
20	(Sweden) Oliver Solberg	(United Kingdom) Elliott Edmondson	(Finland) Printsport	Toyota GR Yaris Rally2	Driver, Co-driver	H
21	(France) Yohan Rossel	(France) Arnaud Dunand	(France) PH Sport	Citroën C3 Rally2	Driver, Co-driver	H
22	(United Kingdom) Gus Greensmith	(Sweden) Jonas Andersson	(United Kingdom) Gus Greensmith	Škoda Fabia RS Rally2	Driver, Co-driver	H
23	(Spain) Jan Solans	(Spain) Rodrigo Sanjuan de Eusebio	(Spain) PH.Ph	Toyota GR Yaris Rally2	Challenger Driver, Challenger Co-driver	H
24	(Poland) Kajetan Kajetanowicz	(Poland) Maciej Szczepaniak	(Poland) Kajetan Kajetanowicz	Toyota GR Yaris Rally2	Challenger Driver, Challenger Co-driver	H
25	(Finland) Emil Lindholm	(Finland) Reeta Hämäläinen	(Germany) Toksport WRT	Škoda Fabia RS Rally2	Driver, Co-driver, Team	H
26	(Paraguay) Fabrizio Zaldivar	(Italy) Marcelo Der Ohannesian	(Paraguay) Fabrizio Zaldivar	Škoda Fabia RS Rally2	Challenger Driver, Challenger Co-driver	H
27	(Bulgaria) Nikolay Gryazin	(Kyrgyzstan) Konstantin Aleksandrov	(Germany) Toksport WRT	Škoda Fabia RS Rally2	Challenger Driver, Challenger Co-driver, Team	H
29	(Paraguay) Diego Domínguez Jr.	(Spain) Rogelio Peñate	(Paraguay) Diego Domínguez Jr.	Toyota GR Yaris Rally2	Challenger Driver, Challenger Co-driver	H
30	(Bolivia) Marco Bulacia	(Brazil) Gabriel Morales	(Bolivia) Marco Bulacia	Toyota GR Yaris Rally2	Challenger Driver, Challenger Co-driver	H
31	(Argentina) Martin Scuncio	(Chile) Javiera Roman	(Argentina) Martin Scuncio	Škoda Fabia Rally2 evo	Challenger Driver, Challenger Co-driver	H
32	(Chile) Jorge Martínez Fontena	(Argentina) Rubén García	(Chile) Jorge Martínez Fontena	Škoda Fabia RS Rally2	Challenger Driver, Challenger Co-driver	H
34	(Chile) Gerardo V. Rosselot	(Argentina) Marcelo Brizio	(Chile) Gerardo V. Rosselot	Citroën C3 Rally2	Challenger Driver, Challenger Co-driver	H
35	(Chile) Emilio Rosselot	(Chile) Matias Leiva	(Chile) Emilio Rosselot	Citroën C3 Rally2	Challenger Driver, Challenger Co-driver	H
36	(Chile) Pedro Heller	(Chile) Matias Amestica	(Chile) Pedro Heller	Citroën C3 Rally2	Challenger Driver, Challenger Co-driver	H
37	(Paraguay) Alejandro Galanti	(Paraguay) Marcelo Toyotoshi	(Paraguay) Alejandro Galanti	Toyota GR Yaris Rally2	Challenger Driver, Challenger Co-driver	H
38	(Paraguay) Miguel Zaldivar	(Argentina) Matías Ramos	(Paraguay) Miguel Zaldivar	Škoda Fabia RS Rally2	Challenger Driver, Challenger Co-driver	H
39	(Mexico) Miguel Granados	(Spain) Marc Martí	(Mexico) Miguel Granados	Škoda Fabia RS Rally2	Challenger/Masters Driver, Challenger/Masters Co-driver	H
40	(Peru) Jorge Martínez Merizalde	(Chile) José Alberto Aros	(Peru) Jorge Martínez Merizalde	Hyundai i20 N Rally2	Challenger/Masters Driver, Challenger Co-driver	H

Rally3 entries competing in the WRC3 Championship
No.	Driver	Co-Driver	Entrant	Car	Class/Championship eligibility	Tyre
41	(Italy) Matteo Fontana	(Italy) Alessandro Arnaboldi	(Italy) Matteo Fontana	Ford Fiesta Rally3	WRC3	H
42	(France) Ghjuvanni Rossi	(France) Kylian Sarmezan	(France) Ghjuvanni Rossi	Ford Fiesta Rally3	WRC3	H
43	(Bolivia) Nataniel Bruun	(Argentina) Pablo Olmos	(Bolivia) Nataniel Bruun	Ford Fiesta Rally3	WRC3	H
44	(Peru) André Martinez	(Argentina) Matias Aranguren	(Peru) André Martinez	Ford Fiesta Rally3	WRC3	H
45	(Greece) Georgios Vasilakis	(Republic of Ireland) Allan Harryman	(Greece) Georgios Vasilakis	Ford Fiesta Rally3	WRC3, Masters Driver, Masters Co-Driver	H
46	(Peru) Eduardo Castro	(Peru) Julio Echazú	(Peru) Eduardo Castro	Ford Fiesta Rally3	WRC3	H
47	(Uruguay) Ignacio Gardiol	(Argentina) Ignacio Uez Ahumada	(Uruguay) Ignacio Gardiol	Ford Fiesta Rally3	WRC3	H
48	(Chile) Felipe Padilla	(Chile) Sebastián Olguín	(Chile) Felipe Padilla	Ford Fiesta Rally3	WRC3	H
49	(Chile) Patricio Muñoz	(Argentina) Miguel Recalt	(Chile) Patricio Muñoz	Ford Fiesta Rally3	WRC3	H
50	(Chile) Carlos Prieto	(Argentina) Juan Cruz Varela	(Chile) Carlos Prieto	Ford Fiesta Rally3	WRC3	H
51	(Chile) Luis Nuñez	(Chile) Sebastian Medrano	(Chile) Luis Nuñez	Ford Fiesta Rally3	WRC3, Masters Driver	H
52	(Chile) Eduardo Kovacs Bauer	(Argentina) Alberto Alvarez	(Chile) Eduardo Kovacs Bauer	Ford Fiesta Rally3	WRC3, Masters Driver	H

=== Itinerary ===
All dates and times are CLT (UTC−3).

Date	No.	Time span	Stage name	Distance
11 September	—	After 9:01	Conuco [Shakedown]	6.79 km
11 September		After 19:00	Opening ceremony, Concepción Bicentenario	—N/a
12 September	SS1	After 8:15	Pulperia 1	19.72 km
12 September	SS2	After 9:10	Rere 1	13.34 km
12 September	SS3	After 10:01	San Rosendo 1	23.32 km
12 September		12:16 – 12:56	Regroup, MDS Hotel Talcahuano	—N/a
12 September		12:56 – 13:36	Flexi service A, MDS Hotel Talcahuano	—N/a
12 September	SS4	After 14:41	Pulperia 2	19.72 km
12 September	SS5	After 15:36	Rere 2	13.34 km
12 September	SS6	After 16:27	San Rosendo 2	23.32 km
12 September		18:52 – 19:37	Flexi service B, MDS Hotel Talcahuano	—N/a
13 September	SS7	After 9:07	Pelun 1	15.65 km
13 September	SS8	After 10:01	Lota 1	25.64 km
13 September	SS9	After 11:05	Maria las Cruces 1	28.31 km
13 September		13:00 – 13:37	Regroup, MDS Hotel Talcahuano	—N/a
13 September		13:37 – 14:07	Flexi service C, MDS Hotel Talcahuano	—N/a
13 September	SS10	After 15:07	Pelun 2	15.65 km
13 September	SS11	After 16:01	Lota 2	25.64 km
13 September	SS12	After 17:05	Maria las Cruces 2	28.31 km
13 September		19:10 – 19:55	Flexi service D, MDS Hotel Talcahuano	—N/a
14 September	SS13	After 8:23	Laraquete 1	18.62 km
14 September	SS14	After 9:35	BioBío 1	8.78 km
14 September	SS15	After 10:35	Laraquete 2	18.62 km
14 September		11:25 – 12:29	Regroup, Arauco	—N/a
14 September	SS16	After 13:15	BioBío 2 [Power Stage]	8.78 km
14 September		After 15:10	Podium ceremony, Arauco	—N/a

== Report ==
=== WRC Rally1 ===
==== Classification ====
Position		No.	Driver	Co-driver	Entrant	Car	Time	Difference	Points			
Event	Class	No.	Driver	Co-driver	Entrant	Car	Time	Difference	Event	Sunday	Stage	Total
1	1	17	Sébastien Ogier	Vincent Landais	Toyota Gazoo Racing WRT	Toyota GR Yaris Rally1	2:55:42.1	0.0	25	5	5	35
2	2	33	Elfyn Evans	Scott Martin	Toyota Gazoo Racing WRT	Toyota GR Yaris Rally1	2:55:53.1	++11.0	17	4	3	24
3	3	16	Adrien Fourmaux	Alexandre Coria	Hyundai Shell Mobis WRT	Hyundai i20 N Rally1	2:56:28.6	+46.5	15	0	0	15
4	4	1	Thierry Neuville	Martijn Wydaeghe	Hyundai Shell Mobis WRT	Hyundai i20 N Rally1	2:56:41.1	+59.0	12	0	4	16
5	5	5	Sami Pajari	Marko Salminen	Toyota Gazoo Racing WRT2	Toyota GR Yaris Rally1	2:56:45.5	+1:03.4	10	2	2	14
6	6	69	Kalle Rovanperä	Jonne Halttunen	Toyota Gazoo Racing WRT	Toyota GR Yaris Rally1	2:57:17.8	+1:35.7	8	3	1	12
7	7	18	Takamoto Katsuta	Aaron Johnston	Toyota Gazoo Racing WRT	Toyota GR Yaris Rally1	2:57:56.1	+2:14.0	6	0	0	6
8	8	13	Grégoire Munster	Louis Louka	M-Sport Ford WRT	Ford Puma Rally1	2:58:26.2	+2:44.1	4	0	0	4
34	9	10	Ott Tänak	Martin Järveoja	Hyundai Shell Mobis WRT	Hyundai i20 N Rally1	3:44:57.5	+49:15.4	0	1	0	1
37	10	55	Josh McErlean	Eoin Treacy	M-Sport Ford WRT	Ford Puma Rally1	3:58:51.6	+1:03:09.5	0	0	0	0
38	11	28	Alberto Heller	Luis Allende	M-Sport Ford WRT	Ford Puma Rally1	3:59:18.7	+1:03:36.6	0	0	0	0

==== Special stages ====
Stage	Winners	Car	Time	Class leaders
SD	Tänak / Järveoja	Hyundai i20 N Rally1	3:21.5	—N/a
SS1	Rovanperä / Halttunen	Toyota GR Yaris Rally1	10:00.4	Rovanperä / Halttunen
SS2	Rovanperä / Halttunen	Toyota GR Yaris Rally1	6:45.6	Rovanperä / Halttunen
SS3	Evans / Martin	Toyota GR Yaris Rally1	12:13.7	Evans / Martin
SS4	Pajari / Salminen	Toyota GR Yaris Rally1	9:46.1	Tänak / Järveoja
SS5	Tänak / Järveoja	Hyundai i20 N Rally1	6:35.4	Tänak / Järveoja
SS6	Ogier / Landais	Toyota GR Yaris Rally1	12:02.8	Fourmaux / Coria
SS7	Tanak / Järveoja	Hyundai i20 N Rally1	10:37.7	Fourmaux / Coria
SS8	Tanak / Järveoja	Hyundai i20 N Rally1	15:20.8	Fourmaux / Coria
SS9	Rovanpera / Halttunen	Toyota GR Yaris Rally1	16:43.7	Evans / Martin
SS10	Ogier / Landais	Toyota GR Yaris Rally1	10:20.7	Evans / Martin
SS11	Ogier / Landais	Toyota GR Yaris Rally1	15:08.1	Ogier / Landais
SS12	Ogier / Landais	Toyota GR Yaris Rally1	16:31.2	Ogier / Landais
SS13	Ogier / Landais	Toyota GR Yaris Rally1	11:50.0	Ogier / Landais
SS14	Evans / Martin	Toyota GR Yaris Rally1	4:29.5	Ogier / Landais
SS15	Ogier / Landais	Toyota GR Yaris Rally1	11:41.8	Ogier / Landais
SS16	Ogier / Landais	Toyota GR Yaris Rally1	4:25.6	Ogier / Landais

==== Championship standings ====
Drivers' Standings
Move	Pos.	Driver	Points
2	1	Sébastien Ogier	224
1	2	Elfyn Evans	222
1	3	Kalle Rovanperä	203
	4	Ott Tänak	181
	5	Thierry Neuville	166

Co-drivers' Standings
Move	Pos.	Driver	Points
2	1	Vincent Landais	224
1	2	Scott Martin	222
1	3	Jonne Halttunen	203
	4	Martin Järveoja	181
	5	Martijn Wydaeghe	166

Manufacturers' Standings
Move	Pos.	Driver	Points
	1	Toyota Gazoo Racing WRT	572
	2	Hyundai Shell Mobis WRT	447
	3	M-Sport Ford WRT	157
	4	Toyota Gazoo Racing WRT2	111

=== WRC2 Rally2 ===
==== Classification ====
Position		No.	Driver	Co-driver	Entrant	Car	Time	Difference	Points	
Event	Class	No.	Driver	Co-driver	Entrant	Car	Time	Difference	Class	Event
9	1	20	Oliver Solberg	Elliott Edmondson	Printsport	Toyota GR Yaris Rally2	3:04:00.7	0.0	25	2
10	2	27	Nikolay Gryazin	Konstantin Aleksandrov	Toksport WRT	Škoda Fabia RS Rally2	3:04:41.1	+40.4	17	1
11	3	23	Nikolay Gryazin	Konstantin Aleksandrov	Toksport WRT	Škoda Fabia RS Rally2	3:05:48.5	+1:47.8	15	0
12	4	32	Jorge Martínez Fontena	Rubén García	Jorge Martínez Fontena	Škoda Fabia RS Rally2	3:08:09.7	+4:09.0	12	0
13	5	26	Fabrizio Zaldivar	Marcelo Der Ohannesian	Fabrizio Zaldivar	Škoda Fabia RS Rally2	3:08:11.2	+4:10.5	10	0
14	6	24	Kajetan Kajetanowicz	Maciej Szczepaniak	Kajetan Kajetanowicz	Toyota GR Yaris Rally2	3:12:37.2	+8:36.5	8	0
15	7	34	Gerardo V. Rosselot	Marcelo Brizio	Gerardo V. Rosselot	Citroën C3 Rally2	3:12:52.3	+8:51.6	6	0
16	8	31	Martin Scuncio	Javiera Roman	Martin Scuncio	Škoda Fabia Rally2 evo	3:16:50.3	+12:49.6	4	0
17	9	35	Emilio Rosselot	Matias Leiva	Emilio Rosselot	Citroën C3 Rally2	3:20:53.9	+16:53.2	2	0
18	10	37	Alejandro Galanti	Marcelo Toyotoshi	Alejandro Galanti	Toyota GR Yaris Rally2	3:20:54.1	+16:53.4	1	0
23	11	21	Yohan Rossel	Arnaud Dunand	PH Sport	Citroën C3 Rally2	3:24:59.4	+20:58.7	0	0
25	12	36	Pedro Heller	Matias Amestica	Pedro Heller	Citroën C3 Rally2	3:25:31.8	+21:31.1	0	0
26	13	22	Gus Greensmith	Jonas Andersson	Gus Greensmith	Škoda Fabia RS Rally2	3:25:36.4	+21:35.7	0	0
28	14	39	Miguel Granados	Marc Martí	Miguel Granados	Škoda Fabia RS Rally2	3:28:34.9	+24:34.2	0	0
31	15	40	Jorge Martínez Merizalde	José Alberto Aros	Jorge Martínez Merizalde	Hyundai i20 N Rally2	3:39:55.4	+35:54.7	0	0
Retired SS15		25	Emil Lindholm	Reeta Hämäläinen	Toksport WRT	Škoda Fabia RS Rally2	Withdrawn		0	0
Retired SS6		29	Diego Domínguez Jr.	Rogelio Peñate	Diego Domínguez Jr.	Toyota GR Yaris Rally2	Accident		0	0

==== Special stages ====
Overall
Stage	Winners	Car	Time	Class leaders
SD	Gryazin / Aleksandrov	Skoda Fabia RS Rally2	3:35.1	—N/a
SS1	Gryazin / Aleksandrov	Skoda Fabia RS Rally2	10:32.2	Gryazin / Aleksandrov
SS2	Gryazin / Aleksandrov	Skoda Fabia RS Rally2	7:02.8	Gryazin / Aleksandrov
SS3	Solberg / Edmondson	Toyota GR Yaris Rally2	12:50.7	Solberg / Edmondson
SS4	Gryazin / Aleksandrov	Skoda Fabia RS Rally2	10:10.4	Solberg / Edmondson
SS5	Gryazin / Aleksandrov	Skoda Fabia RS Rally2	6:53.0	Solberg / Edmondson
SS6	Solberg / Edmondson	Toyota GR Yaris Rally2	12:31.8	Solberg / Edmondson
SS7	Solberg / Edmondson	Toyota GR Yaris Rally2	11:06.3	Solberg / Edmondson
SS8	Solberg / Edmondson	Toyota GR Yaris Rally2	16:18.1	Solberg / Edmondson
SS9	Solberg / Edmondson	Toyota GR Yaris Rally2	17:39.7	Solberg / Edmondson
SS10	Rossel / Dunand	Citroën C3 Rally2	10:46.7	Solberg / Edmondson
SS11	Gryazin / Aleksandrov	Skoda Fabia RS Rally2	15:57.1	Solberg / Edmondson
SS12	Solberg / Edmondson	Toyota GR Yaris Rally2	17:11.6	Solberg / Edmondson
SS13	Greensmith / Andersson	Škoda Fabia RS Rally2	12:30.0	Solberg / Edmondson
SS14	Greensmith / Andersson	Škoda Fabia RS Rally2	4:48.1	Solberg / Edmondson
SS14	Gryazin / Aleksandrov	Skoda Fabia RS Rally2	4:48.1	Solberg / Edmondson
SS15	Greensmith / Andersson	Škoda Fabia RS Rally2	12:23.0	Solberg / Edmondson
SS16	Rossel / Dunand	Citroën C3 Rally2	4:46.2	Solberg / Edmondson

Challenger
Stage	Winners	Car	Time	Class leaders
SD	Gryazin / Aleksandrov	Skoda Fabia RS Rally2	3:35.1	—N/a
SS1	Gryazin / Aleksandrov	Skoda Fabia RS Rally2	10:32.2	Gryazin / Aleksandrov
SS2	Gryazin / Aleksandrov	Skoda Fabia RS Rally2	7:02.8	Gryazin / Aleksandrov
SS3	Lindholm / Hämäläinen	Škoda Fabia RS Rally2	13:02.2	Gryazin / Aleksandrov
SS4	Gryazin / Aleksandrov	Skoda Fabia RS Rally2	10:10.4	Gryazin / Aleksandrov
SS5	Gryazin / Aleksandrov	Skoda Fabia RS Rally2	6:53.0	Gryazin / Aleksandrov
SS6	Gryazin / Aleksandrov	Skoda Fabia RS Rally2	12:38.7	Gryazin / Aleksandrov
SS7	Gryazin / Aleksandrov	Skoda Fabia RS Rally2	11:10.4	Gryazin / Aleksandrov
SS8	Solans / Sanjuan de Eusebio	Toyota GR Yaris Rally2	16:24.4	Gryazin / Aleksandrov
SS9	Gryazin / Aleksandrov	Skoda Fabia RS Rally2	17:45.2	Gryazin / Aleksandrov
SS10	Solans / Sanjuan de Eusebio	Toyota GR Yaris Rally2	10:50.4	Gryazin / Aleksandrov
SS11	Gryazin / Aleksandrov	Skoda Fabia RS Rally2	15:57.1	Gryazin / Aleksandrov
SS12	Gryazin / Aleksandrov	Skoda Fabia RS Rally2	17:19.5	Gryazin / Aleksandrov
SS13	Gryazin / Aleksandrov	Skoda Fabia RS Rally2	12:32.7	Gryazin / Aleksandrov
SS14	Gryazin / Aleksandrov	Skoda Fabia RS Rally2	4:48.1	Gryazin / Aleksandrov
SS15	Zaldivar / Der Ohannesian	Škoda Fabia RS Rally2	12:33.8	Gryazin / Aleksandrov
SS16	Gryazin / Aleksandrov	Skoda Fabia RS Rally2	4:47.2	Gryazin / Aleksandrov

==== Championship standings ====
- **Bold text** indicates 2025 World Champions.

Drivers' Standings
Move	Pos.	Driver	Points
	1	**Oliver Solberg**	135
	2	Yohan Rossel	99
	3	Roope Korhonen	69
	4	Robert Virves	60
	5	Gus Greensmith	57

Co-drivers' Standings
Move	Pos.	Driver	Points
	1	**Elliott Edmondson**	135
	2	Arnaud Dunand	99
	3	Anssi Viinikka	69
	4	Jakko Viilo	60
	5	Jonas Andersson	57

Manufacturers' Standings
Move	Pos.	Driver	Points
1	1	Toksport WRT	198
1	2	PH Sport	178
	3	Toyota Gazoo Racing WRT NG	89
	4	Sarrazin Motorsport – Iron Lynx	64

Challenger Drivers' Standings
Move	Pos.	Driver	Points
	1	Roope Korhonen	90
	2	Robert Virves	75
2	3	Jan Solans	72
	4	Kajetan Kajetanowicz	72
2	5	Roberto Daprà	71

Challenger Co-drivers' Standings
Move	Pos.	Driver	Points
	1	Anssi Viinikka	90
	2	Jakko Viilo	75
2	3	Diego Sanjuan de Eusebio	72
1	4	Maciej Szczepaniak	72
5	5	Konstantin Aleksandrov	67

=== WRC3 Rally3 ===
==== Classification ====
Position		No.	Driver	Co-driver	Entrant	Car	Time	Difference	Points
Event	Class	No.	Driver	Co-driver	Entrant	Car	Time	Difference	Points
19	1	41	Matteo Fontana	Alessandro Arnaboldi	Matteo Fontana	Ford Fiesta Rally3	3:21:07.2	0.0	25
20	2	43	Nataniel Bruun	Pablo Olmos	Nataniel Bruun	Ford Fiesta Rally3	3:21:16.5	+9.3	17
21	3	46	Eduardo Castro	Julio Echazú	Eduardo Castro	Ford Fiesta Rally3	3:23:54.6	+2:47.4	15
22	4	47	Ignacio Gardiol	Ignacio Uez Ahumada	Ignacio Gardiol	Ford Fiesta Rally3	3:24:13.2	+3:06.0	12
24	5	48	Felipe Padilla	Sebastián Olguín	Felipe Padilla	Ford Fiesta Rally3	3:25:22.1	+4:14.9	10
28	6	44	André Martinez	Matias Aranguren	André Martinez	Ford Fiesta Rally3	3:26:47.9	+5:40.7	8
29	7	50	Carlos Prieto	Juan Cruz Varela	Carlos Prieto	Ford Fiesta Rally3	3:36:38.7	+15:31.5	6
30	8	52	Eduardo Kovacs Bauer	Alberto Alvarez	Eduardo Kovacs Bauer	Ford Fiesta Rally3	3:36:51.7	+15:44.5	4
36	9	54	Georgios Vasilakis	Allan Harryman	Georgios Vasilakis	Ford Fiesta Rally3	3:53:15.9	+32:08.7	2
Retired SS14		49	Patricio Muñoz	Miguel Recalt	Patricio Muñoz	Ford Fiesta Rally3	Withdarwn		0
Retired SS10		42	Ghjuvanni Rossi	Kylian Sarmezan	Ghjuvanni Rossi	Ford Fiesta Rally3	Mechanical		0

==== Special stages ====
Stage	Winners	Car	Time	Class leaders
SD	Castro / Echazú	Ford Fiesta Rally3	3:52.7	—N/a
SS1	Bruun / Olmos	Ford Fiesta Rally3	11:38.2	Bruun / Olmos
SS2	Fontana / Arnaboldi	Ford Fiesta Rally3	7:42.6	Fontana / Arnaboldi
SS3	Fontana / Arnaboldi	Ford Fiesta Rally3	14:04.5	Fontana / Arnaboldi
SS4	Fontana / Arnaboldi	Ford Fiesta Rally3	11:13.0	Fontana / Arnaboldi
SS4	Bruun / Olmos	Ford Fiesta Rally3	11:13.0	Fontana / Arnaboldi
SS5	Fontana / Arnaboldi	Ford Fiesta Rally3	7:31.9	Fontana / Arnaboldi
SS6	Fontana / Arnaboldi	Ford Fiesta Rally3	13:46.7	Fontana / Arnaboldi
SS7	Muñoz / Recalt	Ford Fiesta Rally3	12:08.6	Fontana / Arnaboldi
SS8	Gardiol / Uez Ahumada	Ford Fiesta Rally3	17:45.2	Bruun / Olmos
SS9	Muñoz / Recalt	Ford Fiesta Rally3	19:17.3	Bruun / Olmos
SS10	Fontana / Arnaboldi	Ford Fiesta Rally3	11:22.8	Bruun / Olmos
SS11	Fontana / Arnaboldi	Ford Fiesta Rally3	16:52.6	Bruun / Olmos
SS12	Fontana / Arnaboldi	Ford Fiesta Rally3	18:19.2	Bruun / Olmos
SS13	Bruun / Olmos	Ford Fiesta Rally3	13:22.5	Bruun / Olmos
SS14	Fontana / Arnaboldi	Ford Fiesta Rally3	5:02.0	Bruun / Olmos
SS15	Fontana / Arnaboldi	Ford Fiesta Rally3	12:59.2	Fontana / Arnaboldi
SS16	Fontana / Arnaboldi	Ford Fiesta Rally3	5:05.3	Fontana / Arnaboldi

==== Championship standings ====
Drivers' Standings
Move	Pos.	Driver	Points
1	1	Matteo Fontana	109
1	2	Taylor Gill	92
	3	Arthur Pelamourges	60
4	4	Nataniel Bruun	60
1	5	Ali Türkkan	59

Co-drivers' Standings
Move	Pos.	Driver	Points
1	1	Alessandro Arnaboldi	109
1	2	Daniel Brkic	92
	3	Bastien Pouget	60
3	4	Pablo Olmos	60
1	5	Oytun Albaykar	59

Previous rally: 2025 Rally del Paraguay	2025 FIA World Rally Championship	Next rally: 2025 Central European Rally
Previous rally: 2024 Rally Chile	2025 Rally Chile	Next rally: 2026 Rally Chile
