= 2026 Rally Finland =

75th edition of the Rally Finland

2026 Rally Finland Secto Rally Finland 2026
Round 10 of 13 in the 2026 World Rally Championship
| ← Previous event | Next event → |
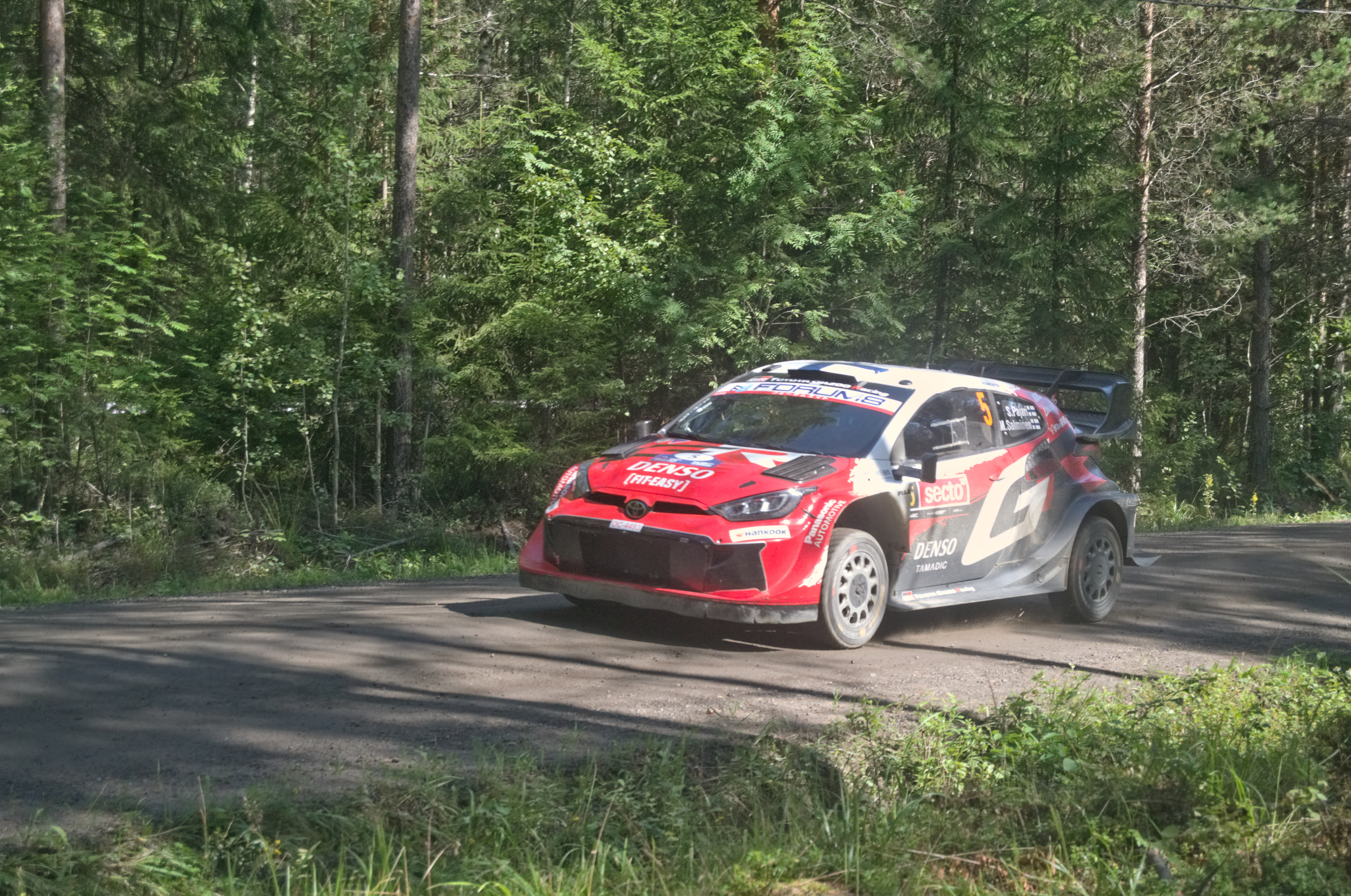
- Rally winners Sami Pajari and Marko Salminen driving a Toyota GR Yaris Rally1 druing the event.
- Host country: Finland
- Rally base: Jyväskylä, Central Finland
- Dates run: 30 July – 2 August 2026
- Start location: Jyväskylä, Central Finland
- Finish location: Jämsä, Central Finland
- Stages: 20 (316.04 km; 196.38 miles)
- Stage surface: Gravel
- Transport distance: 962.02 km (597.77 miles)
- Overall distance: 1,278.06 km (794.15 miles)

Statistics
- Crews registered: 61
- Crews: 61 at start, 48 at finish

Overall results
- Overall winner: (Finland) Sami Pajari (Finland) Marko Salminen (Japan) Toyota Gazoo Racing WRT2; 2:27:58.0
- Sunday Accumulated leader: (Sweden) Oliver Solberg (United Kingdom) Elliott Edmondson (Japan) Toyota Gazoo Racing WRT; 27:00.3
- Power Stage winner: (United Kingdom) Elfyn Evans (United Kingdom) Scott Martin (Japan) Toyota Gazoo Racing WRT; 13:22.2

Support category results
- WRC-2 winner: (Estonia) Robert Virves (Estonia) Jakko Viilo (Germany) Toksport WRT; 2:36:44.9
- WRC-3 winner: (Spain) Gil Membrado (Spain) Adrián Pérez; 2:48:29.0
- J-WRC winner: (Spain) Gil Membrado (Spain) Adrián Pérez; 2:48:29.0

The 2026 Rally Finland (also known as the Secto Rally Finland 2026) was a motor racing event for rally cars held over four days from 30 July to 2 August 2026. It marked the seventy-fifth running of the Rally Finland, and was the tenth round of the 2026 World Rally Championship, 2026 WRC2 Championship and 2026 WRC3 Championship. The event was also the fourth round of the 2026 Junior WRC Championship. The 2026 event was based in Jyväskylä in Central Finland, and consisted of twenty special stages, covering a total competitive distance of 316.04 km (196.38 mi).

Kalle Rovanperä and Jonne Halttunen were the defending rally winners, and their team, Toyota Gazoo Racing WRT, were the defending manufacturer's winners. However, they did not defend their titles as Rovanperä moved to the Super Formula Championship. Roope Korhonen and Anssi Viinikka were the defending rally winners in the WRC2 championship. Taylor Gill and Daniel Brkic were the defending rally winners in the WRC3 championship. Eamonn Kelly and Conor Mohan were the defending rally winners in the junior championship.

Sami Pajari and Marko Salminen won their second rally of the season, and Toyota successfully defended their manufacturer's title. Robert Virves and Jakko Viilo were the winners in the WRC2 category. Gil Membrado and Adrián Pérez were the winners in the WRC3 category as well as the junior championship.

== Background ==
=== Entry list ===
The following crews entered into the rally. The event was opened to crews competing in the World Rally Championship, its support categories, the WRC2 Championship, the WRC3 Championship and privateer entries that were not registered to score points in any championship. Eleven crews entered under Rally1 regulations, as were twenty-seven Rally2 crews in the WRC2 Championship and twelve Rally3 crews in the WRC3 Championship. A total of six crews participated in the Junior World Rally Championship.

Rally1 entries competing in the World Rally Championship
| No. | Driver | Co-Driver | Entrant | Car | Championship eligibility | Tyre |
|---|---|---|---|---|---|---|
| 1 | (France) Sébastien Ogier | (France) Julien Ingrassia | (Japan) Toyota Gazoo Racing WRT | Toyota GR Yaris Rally1 | Driver, Co-driver, Manufacturer | H |
| 4 | (Finland) Esapekka Lappi | (Finland) Enni Mälkönen | (South Korea) Hyundai Shell Mobis WRT | Hyundai i20 N Rally1 | Driver, Co-driver, Manufacturer | H |
| 5 | (Finland) Sami Pajari | (Finland) Marko Salminen | (Japan) Toyota Gazoo Racing WRT2 | Toyota GR Yaris Rally1 | Driver, Co-driver, Manufacturer, Team | H |
| 11 | (Belgium) Thierry Neuville | (Belgium) Martijn Wydaeghe | (South Korea) Hyundai Shell Mobis WRT | Hyundai i20 N Rally1 | Driver, Co-driver, Manufacturer | H |
| 16 | (France) Adrien Fourmaux | (France) Alexandre Coria | (South Korea) Hyundai Shell Mobis WRT | Hyundai i20 N Rally1 | Driver, Co-driver, Manufacturer | H |
| 18 | (Japan) Takamoto Katsuta | (Republic of Ireland) Aaron Johnston | (Japan) Toyota Gazoo Racing WRT | Toyota GR Yaris Rally1 | Driver, Co-driver | H |
| 22 | (Latvia) Mārtiņš Sesks | (Latvia) Renārs Francis | (United Kingdom) M-Sport Ford WRT | Ford Puma Rally1 | Driver, Co-driver | H |
| 33 | (United Kingdom) Elfyn Evans | (United Kingdom) Scott Martin | (Japan) Toyota Gazoo Racing WRT | Toyota GR Yaris Rally1 | Driver, Co-driver, Manufacturer | H |
| 55 | (Republic of Ireland) Josh McErlean | (Republic of Ireland) Eoin Treacy | (United Kingdom) M-Sport Ford WRT | Ford Puma Rally1 | Driver, Co-driver, Manufacturer | H |
| 95 | (Republic of Ireland) Jon Armstrong | (Republic of Ireland) Shane Byrne | (United Kingdom) M-Sport Ford WRT | Ford Puma Rally1 | Driver, Co-driver, Manufacturer | H |
| 99 | (Sweden) Oliver Solberg | (United Kingdom) Elliott Edmondson | (Japan) Toyota Gazoo Racing WRT | Toyota GR Yaris Rally1 | Driver, Co-driver, Manufacturer | H |

Rally2 entries competing in the WRC2 Championship
| No. | Driver | Co-Driver | Entrant | Car | Championship eligibility | Tyre |
|---|---|---|---|---|---|---|
| 20 | (Finland) Roope Korhonen | (Finland) Anssi Viinikka | (Finland) Rautio Motorsport | Toyota GR Yaris Rally2 | Challenger Driver, Challenger Co-driver | H |
| 21 | (France) Léo Rossel | (France) Guillaume Mercoiret | (France) 2C Junior Team | Lancia Ypsilon Rally2 HF Integrale | Challenger Driver, Challenger Co-driver, Team | H |
| 23 | (Bulgaria) Nikolay Gryazin | (Kyrgyzstan) Konstantin Aleksandrov | (Italy) Lancia Corse HF | Lancia Ypsilon Rally2 HF Integrale | Team | H |
| 24 | (France) Yohan Rossel | (France) Arnaud Dunand | (Italy) Lancia Corse HF | Lancia Ypsilon Rally2 HF Integrale | Team | H |
| 25 | (Estonia) Robert Virves | (Estonia) Jakko Viilo | (Germany) Toksport WRT | Škoda Fabia RS Rally2 | Challenger Driver, Challenger Co-driver, Team | H |
| 26 | (Finland) Teemu Suninen | (Finland) Janni Hussi | (Finland) Teemu Suninen | Toyota GR Yaris Rally2 | Driver, Co-driver | H |
| 27 | (Paraguay) Fabrizio Zaldivar | (Italy) Marcelo Der Ohannesian | (Paraguay) Fabrizio Zaldivar | Škoda Fabia RS Rally2 | Challenger Driver, Challenger Co-driver | H |
| 28 | (Finland) Emil Lindholm | (Brazil) Gabriel Morales | (Germany) Toksport WRT | Škoda Fabia RS Rally2 | Driver, Co-driver, Team | H |
| 30 | (Japan) Yuki Yamamoto | (Republic of Ireland) James Fulton | (Finland) Printsport | Toyota GR Yaris Rally2 | Challenger Driver, Co-driver | H |
| 31 | (Finland) Lauri Joona | (Finland) Antti Linnaketo | (Finland) Lauri Joona | Škoda Fabia RS Rally2 | Challenger Driver, Challenger Co-driver | H |
| 32 | (France) Arthur Pelamourges | (France) Bastien Pouget | (France) Arthur Pelamourges | Hyundai i20 N Rally2 | Challenger Driver, Challenger Co-driver | H |
| 34 | (Australia) Taylor Gill | (Australia) Daniel Brkic | (Australia) Taylor Gill | Toyota GR Yaris Rally2 | Challenger Driver, Challenger Co-driver | H |
| 35 | (Sweden) Mille Johansson | (Sweden) Johan Grönvall | (United Kingdom) M-Sport Ford WRT | Ford Fiesta Rally2 | Challenger Driver, Challenger Co-driver | H |
| 36 | (France) Mattéo Chatillon | (France) Maxence Cornuau | (France) Mattéo Chatillon | Škoda Fabia RS Rally2 | Challenger Driver, Challenger Co-driver | H |
| 38 | (Italy) Giovanni Trentin | (Italy) Pietro Elia Ometto | (Italy) MT Racing SRL | Škoda Fabia RS Rally2 | Challenger Driver, Challenger Co-driver | H |
| 39 | (Estonia) Romet Jürgenson | (Estonia) Siim Oja | (United Kingdom) M-Sport Ford WRT | Ford Fiesta Rally2 | Challenger Driver, Challenger Co-driver | H |
| 41 | (Estonia) Jaspar Vaher | (Estonia) Rait Jansen | (Japan) Toyota Gazoo Racing NG | Toyota GR Yaris Rally2 | Challenger Driver, Challenger Co-driver | H |
| 42 | (Finland) Mikko Heikkilä | (Finland) Kristian Temonen | (Finland) Mikko Heikkilä | Škoda Fabia RS Rally2 | Challenger Driver, Challenger Co-driver | H |
| 43 | (Estonia) Patrick Enok | (Estonia) Silver Simm | (Finland) Printsport | Škoda Fabia RS Rally2 | Challenger Driver, Challenger Co-driver | H |
| 44 | (Finland) Tuukka Kauppinen | (Finland) Sebastian Virtanen | (Finland) Rautio Motorsport | Toyota GR Yaris Rally2 | Challenger Driver, Challenger Co-driver | H |
| 45 | (Estonia) Joosep Ralf Nõgene | (Estonia) Aleks Lesk | (Estonia) Joosep Ralf Nõgene | Toyota GR Yaris Rally2 | Challenger Driver, Challenger Co-driver | H |
| 46 | (Japan) Takumi Matsushita | (Finland) Pekka Kelander | (Japan) Toyota Gazoo Racing NG | Toyota GR Yaris Rally2 | Challenger Driver, Challenger Co-driver | H |
| 47 | (Japan) Shotaro Goto | (Finland) Jussi Lindberg | (Japan) Toyota Gazoo Racing NG | Toyota GR Yaris Rally2 | Challenger Driver, Challenger Co-driver | H |
| 48 | (Czech Republic) Martin Prokop | (Czech Republic) Michal Ernst | (Czech Republic) Martin Prokop | Škoda Fabia RS Rally2 | Challenger Driver, Challenger Co-driver | H |
| 49 | (France) Eliott Delecour | (France) Fabrice Gordon | (France) Eliott Delecour | Toyota GR Yaris Rally2 | Challenger Driver, Challenger Co-driver | H |
| 50 | (United States) Conner Martell | (Italy) Alex Gelsomino | (France) 2C Junior Team | Lancia Ypsilon Rally2 HF Integrale | Challenger Driver, Challenger Co-driver, Team | H |
| 51 | (France) Adrien Mosca | (France) Julie Amblard | (Finland) Printsport | Toyota GR Yaris Rally2 | Challenger Driver, Challenger Co-driver | H |
| 52 | (Turkey) Uğur Soylu | (Turkey) Mehmet Akif Yalçın | (Turkey) GP Garage My Team | Škoda Fabia RS Rally2 | Challenger/Masters Driver, Challenger Co-driver | H |
| 53 | (Austria) Johannes Keferböck | (Austria) Ilka Minor | (Austria) Johannes Keferböck | Toyota GR Yaris Rally2 | Challenger/Masters Driver, Masters Co-driver | H |

Rally3 entries competing in the WRC3 Championship and/or the Junior World Rally Championship
| No. | Driver | Co-Driver | Entrant | Car | Class eligibility | Tyre |
|---|---|---|---|---|---|---|
| 54 | (Italy) Matteo Fontana | (Italy) Alessandro Arnaboldi | (Italy) Matteo Fontana | Ford Fiesta Rally3 | WRC3 | H |
| 56 | (Poland) Tymoteusz Abramowski | (Poland) Jakub Wróbel | (Poland) Tymoteusz Abramowski | Ford Fiesta Rally3 | WRC3 | H |
| 57 | (Bolivia) Nataniel Bruun | (Spain) Javier Martínez | (Bolivia) Nataniel Bruun | Ford Fiesta Rally3 | WRC3 | H |
| 58 | (Finland) Jarkko Nikara | (Japan) Tomiya Maekawa | (Japan) Toyota Gazoo Racing WRT NG | Renault Clio Rally3 | WRC3 | H |
| 59 | (Japan) Rio Ogata | (Finland) Mikael Korhonen | (Japan) Toyota Gazoo Racing WRT NG | Renault Clio Rally3 | WRC3 | H |
| 60 | (Japan) Kanta Yanaguida | (Finland) Ville Mannisenmäki | (Japan) Toyota Gazoo Racing WRT NG | Renault Clio Rally3 | WRC3 | H |
| 61 | (Finland) Ville Pynnönen | (Finland) Niklas Heino | (Finland) Ville Pynnönen | Renault Clio Rally3 | WRC3 | H |
| 62 | (Finland) Riku Tahko | (Finland) Markus Soininen | (Finland) Riku Tahko | Ford Fiesta Rally3 | WRC3 | H |
| 63 | (Finland) Ismo Leikola | (Finland) Tuomo Hannonen | (Finland) Ismo Leikola | Ford Fiesta Rally3 | WRC3 | H |
| 64 | (Sweden) Calle Carlberg | (Norway) Jørgen Eriksen | (Sweden) Calle Carlberg | Ford Fiesta Rally3 | Junior WRC | H |
| 65 | (Turkey) Ali Türkkan | (Turkey) Bilge Ayan | (Turkey) Castrol Ford Team Türkiye | Ford Fiesta Rally3 | WRC3, Junior WRC | H |
| 66 | (Spain) Gil Membrado | (Spain) Adrián Pérez | (Spain) Gil Membrado | Ford Fiesta Rally3 | WRC3, Junior WRC | H |
| 67 | (Finland) Leevi Lassila | (Finland) Mikko Lukka | (Finland) Leevi Lassila | Ford Fiesta Rally3 | Junior WRC | H |
| 68 | (Republic of Ireland) Craig Rahill | (Republic of Ireland) Conor Smith | (Republic of Ireland) Motorsport Ireland Rally Academy | Ford Fiesta Rally3 | Junior WRC | H |
| 69 | (Turkey) Kerem Kazaz | (France) Corentin Silvestre | (Turkey) Team Petrol Ofisi | Ford Fiesta Rally3 | WRC3, Junior WRC | H |

Other major entries
| No. | Driver | Co-Driver | Entrant | Car | Tyre |
|---|---|---|---|---|---|
| 29 | (United Kingdom) Gus Greensmith | (Sweden) Jonas Andersson | (United Kingdom) Gus Greensmith | Toyota GR Yaris Rally2 | H |
| 37 | (France) Pablo Sarrazin | (France) Yannick Roche | (France) Pablo Sarrazin | Lancia Ypsilon Rally2 HF Integrale | H |
| 40 | (Finland) Jari-Matti Latvala | (Finland) Juho Hänninen | (Finland) JML-Sports Oy | Toyota GR Yaris Rally2 | H |

=== Itinerary ===
All dates and times are EEST (UTC+3).

| Date | No. | Time span | Stage name | Distance |
|---|---|---|---|---|
| 30 July | — | After 9:01 | Ruuhimäki [Shakedown] | 4.12 km |
| 30 July | | After 18:45 | Opening ceremony, Jyväskylä Paviljonki | —N/a |
| 30 July | SS1 | After 19:05 | Harju 1 | 2.58 km |
| 30 July | | 19:40 – 19:55 | Service A, Jyväskylä Paviljonki | —N/a |
| 31 July | SS2 | After 8:44 | Laukaa 1 | 18.16 km |
| 31 July | SS3 | After 9:45 | Saarikas 1 | 15.82 km |
| 31 July | SS4 | After 10:50 | Sydänmaa 1 | 19.04 km |
| 31 July | SS5 | After 11:58 | Hoho 1 | 9.55 km |
| 31 July | | 12:48 – 13:14 | Regroup, Jyväskylä Paviljonki | —N/a |
| 31 July | | 13:14 – 13:44 | Service B, Jyväskylä Paviljonki | —N/a |
| 31 July | SS6 | After 14:48 | Laukaa 2 | 18.16 km |
| 31 July | SS7 | After 15:49 | Saarikas 2 | 15.82 km |
| 31 July | SS8 | After 16:54 | Sydänmaa 2 | 19.04 km |
| 31 July | SS9 | After 18:05 | Hoho 2 | 9.55 km |
| 31 July | SS10 | After 19:05 | Harju 2 | 2.58 km |
| 31 July | | 19:40 – 20:25 | Flexi service C, Jyväskylä Paviljonki | —N/a |
| 1 August | SS11 | After 8:01 | Parkkola 1 | 16.76 km |
| 1 August | SS12 | After 9:42 | Päijälä 1 | 10.55 km |
| 1 August | SS13 | After 10:36 | Västilä 1 | 19.10 km |
| 1 August | SS14 | After 12:05 | Leustu 1 | 16.44 km |
| 1 August | | 13:05 – 13:45 | Regroup, Jyväskylä Paviljonki | —N/a |
| 1 August | | 13:45 – 14:15 | Service D, Jyväskylä Paviljonki | —N/a |
| 1 August | SS15 | After 15:01 | Parkkola 2 | 16.76 km |
| 1 August | SS16 | After 16:42 | Päijälä 2 | 10.55 km |
| 1 August | SS17 | After 17:36 | Västilä 2 | 19.10 km |
| 1 August | SS18 | After 19:05 | Leustu 2 | 16.44 km |
| 1 August | | 20:15 – 21:00 | Flexi service E, Jyväskylä Paviljonki | —N/a |
| 2 August | SS19 | After 10:35 | Himos-Jämsä 1 | 30.02 km |
| 2 August | | 11:10 – 12:50 | Regroup, Himos | —N/a |
| 2 August | SS20 | After 13:15 | Himos-Jämsä 2 [Power Stage] | 30.02 km |
| 2 August | | After 14:15 | Podium ceremony, Himos | —N/a |

== Report ==
=== WRC Rally1 ===
==== Classification ====
| Position | | No. | Driver | Co-driver | Entrant | Car | Time | Difference | Points | | | |
| Event | Class | No. | Driver | Co-driver | Entrant | Car | Time | Difference | Event | Sunday | Stage | Total |
|---|---|---|---|---|---|---|---|---|---|---|---|---|
| 1 | 1 | 5 | Sami Pajari | Marko Salminen | Toyota Gazoo Racing WRT2 | Toyota GR Yaris Rally1 | 2:27:58.0 | 0.0 | 25 | 1 | 1 | 27 |
| 2 | 2 | 99 | Oliver Solberg | Elliott Edmondson | Toyota Gazoo Racing WRT | Toyota GR Yaris Rally1 | 2:28:24.7 | +26.7 | 17 | 5 | 4 | 26 |
| 3 | 3 | 33 | Elfyn Evans | Scott Martin | Toyota Gazoo Racing WRT | Toyota GR Yaris Rally1 | 2:29:17.5 | +1:19.5 | 15 | 4 | 5 | 24 |
| 4 | 4 | 16 | Adrien Fourmaux | Alexandre Coria | Hyundai Shell Mobis WRT | Hyundai i20 N Rally1 | 2:29:33.9 | +1:35.9 | 12 | 3 | 3 | 18 |
| 5 | 5 | 11 | Thierry Neuville | Martijn Wydaeghe | Hyundai Shell Mobis WRT | Hyundai i20 N Rally1 | 2:31:50.5 | +3:52.5 | 10 | 2 | 2 | 14 |
| 6 | 6 | 18 | Takamoto Katsuta | Aaron Johnston | Toyota Gazoo Racing WRT | Toyota GR Yaris Rally1 | 2:32:16.2 | +4:18.2 | 8 | 0 | 0 | 8 |
| 7 | 7 | 55 | Josh McErlean | Eoin Treacy | M-Sport Ford WRT | Ford Puma Rally1 | 2:32:30.7 | +4:32.7 | 6 | 0 | 0 | 6 |
| 42 | 8 | 22 | Mārtiņš Sesks | Renārs Francis | M-Sport Ford WRT | Ford Puma Rally1 | 3:19:50.4 | +51:52.4 | 0 | 0 | 0 | 0 |
| 46 | 9 | 95 | Jon Armstrong | Shane Byrne | M-Sport Ford WRT | Ford Puma Rally1 | 3:49:37.6 | +1:21:39.6 | 0 | 0 | 0 | 0 |
| Retired SS17 | | 1 | Sébastien Ogier | Julien Ingrassia | Toyota Gazoo Racing WRT | Toyota GR Yaris Rally1 | Accident | | 0 | 0 | 0 | 0 |
| Retired SS5 | | 4 | Esapekka Lappi | Enni Mälkönen | Hyundai Shell Mobis WRT | Hyundai i20 N Rally1 | Rolled | | 0 | 0 | 0 | 0 |

==== Special stages ====
| Stage | Winners | Car | Time | Class leaders |
|---|---|---|---|---|
| SD | Katsuta / Johnston | Toyota GR Yaris Rally1 | 2:11.7 | —N/a |
| SS1 | Fourmaux / Coria | Hyundai i20 N Rally1 | 2:06.7 | Fourmaux / Coria |
| SS2 | Ogier / Ingrassia | Toyota GR Yaris Rally1 | 8:26.9 | Ogier / Ingrassia |
| SS3 | Pajari / Salminen | Toyota GR Yaris Rally1 | 7:14.9 | Ogier / Ingrassia |
| SS4 | Ogier / Ingrassia | Toyota GR Yaris Rally1 | 8:34.7 | Ogier / Ingrassia |
| SS5 | Ogier / Ingrassia | Toyota GR Yaris Rally1 | 4:53.8 | Ogier / Ingrassia |
| SS6 | Pajari / Salminen | Toyota GR Yaris Rally1 | 8:17.3 | Ogier / Ingrassia |
| SS7 | Evans / Martin | Toyota GR Yaris Rally1 | 7:12.9 | Ogier / Ingrassia |
| SS8 | Solberg / Edmondson | Toyota GR Yaris Rally1 | 9:10.3 | Ogier / Ingrassia |
| SS9 | Fourmaux / Coria | Hyundai i20 N Rally1 | 5:05.3 | Ogier / Ingrassia |
| SS10 | Neuville / Wydaeghe | Hyundai i20 N Rally1 | 2:11.5 | Ogier / Ingrassia |
| SS10 | Katsuta / Johnston | Toyota GR Yaris Rally1 | 2:11.5 | Ogier / Ingrassia |
| SS11 | Evans / Martin | Toyota GR Yaris Rally1 | 7:48.2 | Ogier / Ingrassia |
| SS12 | Pajari / Salminen | Toyota GR Yaris Rally1 | 4:54.5 | Ogier / Ingrassia |
| SS13 | Pajari / Salminen | Toyota GR Yaris Rally1 | 8:25.0 | Ogier / Ingrassia |
| SS14 | Ogier / Ingrassia | Toyota GR Yaris Rally1 | 7:12.2 | Ogier / Ingrassia |
| SS15 | Pajari / Salminen | Toyota GR Yaris Rally1 | 7:44.5 | Ogier / Ingrassia |
| SS16 | Ogier / Ingrassia | Toyota GR Yaris Rally1 | 4:50.4 | Ogier / Ingrassia |
| SS17 | Pajari / Salminen | Toyota GR Yaris Rally1 | 8:17.8 | Pajari / Salminen |
| SS18 | Evans / Martin | Toyota GR Yaris Rally1 | 7:06.7 | Pajari / Salminen |
| SS19 | Solberg / Edmondson | Toyota GR Yaris Rally1 | 13:38.1 | Pajari / Salminen |
| SS20 | Evans / Martin | Toyota GR Yaris Rally1 | 13:22.2 | Pajari / Salminen |

==== Championship standings ====
Drivers' Standings
| Move | Pos. | Driver | Points |
|---|---|---|---|
| | 1 | Elfyn Evans | 201 |
| 1 | 2 | Sami Pajari | 171 |
| 1 | 3 | Takamoto Katsuta | 160 |
| 1 | 4 | Oliver Solberg | 156 |
| 1 | 5 | Sébastien Ogier | 139 |

Co-drivers' Standings
| Move | Pos. | Driver | Points |
|---|---|---|---|
| | 1 | Scott Martin | 201 |
| 1 | 2 | Marko Salminen | 171 |
| 1 | 3 | Aaron Johnston | 160 |
| 1 | 4 | Elliott Edmondson | 156 |
| 1 | 5 | Vincent Landais | 139 |

Manufacturers' Standings
| Move | Pos. | Driver | Points |
|---|---|---|---|
| | 1 | Toyota Gazoo Racing WRT | 514 |
| | 2 | Hyundai Shell Mobis WRT | 340 |
| | 3 | Toyota Gazoo Racing WRT2 | 184 |
| | 4 | M-Sport Ford WRT | 130 |

=== WRC2 Rally2 ===
==== Classification ====
| Position | | No. | Driver | Co-driver | Entrant | Car | Time | Difference | Points | |
| Event | Class | No. | Driver | Co-driver | Entrant | Car | Time | Difference | Class | Event |
|---|---|---|---|---|---|---|---|---|---|---|
| 9 | 1 | 23 | Robert Virves | Jakko Viilo | Toksport WRT | Škoda Fabia RS Rally2 | 2:36:44.9 | 0.0 | 25 | 2 |
| 10 | 2 | 21 | Teemu Suninen | Janni Hussi | Teemu Suninen | Toyota GR Yaris Rally2 | 2:37:01.0 | +16.1 | 17 | 1 |
| 11 | 3 | 31 | Lauri Joona | Antti Linnaketo | Lauri Joona | Škoda Fabia RS Rally2 | 2:37:39.2 | +54.3 | 15 | 0 |
| 12 | 4 | 41 | Jaspar Vaher | Rait Jansen | Toyota Gazoo Racing NG | Toyota GR Yaris Rally2 | 2:37:40.6 | +55.7 | 12 | 0 |
| 13 | 5 | 39 | Romet Jürgenson | Siim Oja | M-Sport Ford WRT | Ford Fiesta Rally2 | 2:37:50.6 | +1:05.7 | 10 | 0 |
| 15 | 6 | 35 | Mille Johansson | Johan Grönvall | M-Sport Ford WRT | Ford Fiesta Rally2 | 2:38:26.9 | +1:42.0 | 8 | 0 |
| 17 | 7 | 38 | Giovanni Trentin | Pietro Elia Ometto | MT Racing SRL | Škoda Fabia RS Rally2 | 2:39:14.0 | +2:29.1 | 6 | 0 |
| 19 | 8 | 21 | Léo Rossel | Guillaume Mercoiret | 2C Junior Team | Lancia Ypsilon Rally2 HF Integrale | 2:40:23.5 | +3:38.6 | 4 | 0 |
| 20 | 9 | 46 | Takumi Matsushita | Pekka Kelander | Toyota Gazoo Racing NG | Toyota GR Yaris Rally2 | 2:41:17.2 | +4:32.3 | 2 | 0 |
| 21 | 10 | 34 | Taylor Gill | Daniel Brkic | Taylor Gill | Toyota GR Yaris Rally2 | 2:42:55.0 | +6:10.1 | 1 | 0 |
| 22 | 11 | 36 | Mattéo Chatillon | Maxence Cornuau | Mattéo Chatillon | Škoda Fabia RS Rally2 | 2:43:05.4 | +6:20.5 | 0 | 0 |
| 23 | 12 | 50 | Conner Martell | Alex Gelsomino | 2C Junior Team | Lancia Ypsilon Rally2 HF Integrale | 2:44:03.7 | +7:18.8 | 0 | 0 |
| 24 | 13 | 47 | Shotaro Goto | Jussi Lindberg | Toyota Gazoo Racing NG | Toyota GR Yaris Rally2 | 2:44:44.8 | +7:59.9 | 0 | 0 |
| 25 | 14 | 48 | Martin Prokop | Michal Ernst | Martin Prokop | Škoda Fabia RS Rally2 | 2:45:06.1 | +8:21.2 | 0 | 0 |
| 33 | 15 | 51 | Adrien Mosca | Julie Amblard | Printsport | Toyota GR Yaris Rally2 | 2:51:06.1 | +14:21.2 | 0 | 0 |
| 38 | 16 | 52 | Uğur Soylu | Mehmet Akif Yalçın | GP Garage My Team | Škoda Fabia RS Rally2 | 3:03:14.9 | +26:30.0 | 0 | 0 |
| 39 | 17 | 53 | Johannes Keferböck | Ilka Minor | Johannes Keferböck | Toyota GR Yaris Rally2 | 3:03:32.2 | +26:47.3 | 0 | 0 |
| 44 | 18 | 20 | Roope Korhonen | Anssi Viinikka | Rautio Motorsport | Toyota GR Yaris Rally2 | 3:36:03.3 | +59:18.4 | 0 | 0 |
| 45 | 19 | 30 | Yuki Yamamoto | James Fulton | Printsport | Toyota GR Yaris Rally2 | 3:37:13.7 | +1:00:28.8 | 0 | 0 |
| 47 | 20 | 43 | Patrick Enok | Silver Simm | Printsport | Škoda Fabia RS Rally2 | 3:58:28.1 | +1:21:43.2 | 0 | 0 |
| Retired SS20 | | 27 | Fabrizio Zaldivar | Marcelo Der Ohannesian | Fabrizio Zaldivar | Škoda Fabia RS Rally2 | Withdrawn | | 0 | 0 |
| Retired SS20 | | 49 | Eliott Delecour | Fabrice Gordon | Eliott Delecour | Toyota GR Yaris Rally2 | Withdrawn | | 0 | 0 |
| Retired SS14 | | 32 | Arthur Pelamourges | Bastien Pouget | Arthur Pelamourges | Hyundai i20 N Rally2 | Accident | | 0 | 0 |
| Retired SS12 | | 42 | Mikko Heikkilä | Kristian Temonen | Mikko Heikkilä | Škoda Fabia RS Rally2 | Accident | | 0 | 0 |
| Retired SS8 | | 44 | Tuukka Kauppinen | Sebastian Virtanen | Rautio Motorsport | Toyota GR Yaris Rally2 | Rolled | | 0 | 0 |
| Retired SS8 | | 45 | Joosep Ralf Nõgene | Aleks Lesk | Joosep Ralf Nõgene | Toyota GR Yaris Rally2 | Accident | | 0 | 0 |
| Retired SS4 | | 28 | Emil Lindholm | Gabriel Morales | Toksport WRT | Škoda Fabia RS Rally2 | Rolled | | 0 | 0 |

==== Special stages ====
Overall
| Stage | Winners | Car | Time | Class leaders |
|---|---|---|---|---|
| SD | Suninen / Hussi | Toyota GR Yaris Rally2 | 2:19.8 | —N/a |
| SS1 | Virves / Viilo | Škoda Fabia RS Rally2 | 2:10.8 | Virves / Viilo |
| SS2 | Lindholm / Morales | Škoda Fabia RS Rally2 | 8:49.4 | Lindholm / Morales |
| SS3 | Lindholm / Morales | Škoda Fabia RS Rally2 | 7:35.0 | Lindholm / Morales |
| SS4 | Virves / Viilo | Škoda Fabia RS Rally2 | 9:00.0 | Virves / Viilo |
| SS5 | Suninen / Hussi | Toyota GR Yaris Rally2 | 5:07.6 | Korhonen / Viinikka |
| SS6 | Suninen / Hussi | Toyota GR Yaris Rally2 | 8:42.7 | Suninen / Hussi |
| SS7 | Kauppinen / Virtanen | Toyota GR Yaris Rally2 | 8:03.7 | Virves / Viilo |
| SS8 | Joona / Linnaketo | Škoda Fabia RS Rally2 | 9:26.6 | Virves / Viilo |
| SS9 | Virves / Viilo | Škoda Fabia RS Rally2 | 5:18.6 | Virves / Viilo |
| SS10 | Virves / Viilo | Škoda Fabia RS Rally2 | 2:16.0 | Virves / Viilo |
| SS11 | Korhonen / Viinikka | Toyota GR Yaris Rally2 | 8:19.0 | Virves / Viilo |
| SS12 | Suninen / Hussi | Toyota GR Yaris Rally2 | 5:13.7 | Virves / Viilo |
| SS13 | Suninen / Hussi | Toyota GR Yaris Rally2 | 8:57.8 | Virves / Viilo |
| SS14 | Virves / Viilo | Škoda Fabia RS Rally2 | 7:44.9 | Virves / Viilo |
| SS15 | Suninen / Hussi | Toyota GR Yaris Rally2 | 8:10.0 | Virves / Viilo |
| SS16 | Suninen / Hussi | Toyota GR Yaris Rally2 | 5:08.1 | Virves / Viilo |
| SS17 | Suninen / Hussi | Toyota GR Yaris Rally2 | 8:53.5 | Virves / Viilo |
| SS18 | Suninen / Hussi | Toyota GR Yaris Rally2 | 7:34.0 | Virves / Viilo |
| SS19 | Suninen / Hussi | Toyota GR Yaris Rally2 | 14:32.4 | Virves / Viilo |
| SS20 | Korhonen / Viinikka | Toyota GR Yaris Rally2 | 14:18.6 | Virves / Viilo |

Challenger
| Stage | Winners | Car | Time | Class leaders |
|---|---|---|---|---|
| SD | Korhonen / Viinikka | Toyota GR Yaris Rally2 | 2:21.6 | —N/a |
| SS1 | Virves / Viilo | Škoda Fabia RS Rally2 | 2:10.8 | Virves / Viilo |
| SS2 | Heikkilä / Temonen | Škoda Fabia RS Rally2 | 8:54.3 | Heikkilä / Temonen |
| SS3 | Heikkilä / Temonen | Škoda Fabia RS Rally2 | 7:36.4 | Heikkilä / Temonen |
| SS4 | Virves / Viilo | Škoda Fabia RS Rally2 | 9:00.0 | Virves / Viilo |
| SS5 | Korhonen / Viinikka | Toyota GR Yaris Rally2 | 5:08.7 | Korhonen / Viinikka |
| SS6 | Virves / Viilo | Škoda Fabia RS Rally2 | 8:45.2 | Korhonen / Viinikka |
| SS7 | Kauppinen / Virtanen | Toyota GR Yaris Rally2 | 8:03.7 | Virves / Viilo |
| SS8 | Joona / Linnaketo | Škoda Fabia RS Rally2 | 9:26.6 | Virves / Viilo |
| SS9 | Virves / Viilo | Škoda Fabia RS Rally2 | 5:18.6 | Virves / Viilo |
| SS10 | Virves / Viilo | Škoda Fabia RS Rally2 | 2:16.0 | Virves / Viilo |
| SS11 | Korhonen / Viinikka | Toyota GR Yaris Rally2 | 8:19.0 | Virves / Viilo |
| SS12 | Korhonen / Viinikka | Toyota GR Yaris Rally2 | 5:15.3 | Virves / Viilo |
| SS13 | Virves / Viilo | Škoda Fabia RS Rally2 | 9:00.0 | Virves / Viilo |
| SS14 | Virves / Viilo | Škoda Fabia RS Rally2 | 7:44.9 | Virves / Viilo |
| SS15 | Virves / Viilo | Škoda Fabia RS Rally2 | 8:16.4 | Virves / Viilo |
| SS16 | Vaher / Jansen | Toyota GR Yaris Rally2 | 5:09.2 | Virves / Viilo |
| SS17 | stage cacnelled | | | |
| SS18 | Virves / Viilo | Škoda Fabia RS Rally2 | 7:36.2 | Virves / Viilo |
| SS19 | Korhonen / Viinikka | Toyota GR Yaris Rally2 | 14:33.5 | Virves / Viilo |
| SS20 | Korhonen / Viinikka | Toyota GR Yaris Rally2 | 14:18.6 | Virves / Viilo |

==== Championship standings ====
Drivers' Standings
| Move | Pos. | Driver | Points |
|---|---|---|---|
| 1 | 1 | Robert Virves | 100 |
| 1 | 2 | Roope Korhonen | 79 |
| 2 | 3 | Teemu Suninen | 76 |
| | 4 | Léo Rossel | 64 |
| 2 | 5 | Alejandro Cachón | 61 |

Co-drivers' Standings
| Move | Pos. | Driver | Points |
|---|---|---|---|
| 1 | 1 | Jakko Viilo | 100 |
| 1 | 2 | Anssi Viinikka | 79 |
| 2 | 3 | Janni Hussi | 76 |
| | 4 | Guillaume Mercoiret | 64 |
| 2 | 5 | Borja Rozada | 61 |

Manufacturers' Standings
| Move | Pos. | Driver | Points |
|---|---|---|---|
| | 1 | Toksport WRT | 235 |
| | 2 | Lancia Corse HF | 195 |
| | 3 | M-Sport Ford WRT | 45 |
| | 4 | 2C Junior Team | 37 |

Challenger Drivers' Standings
| Move | Pos. | Driver | Points |
|---|---|---|---|
| 1 | 1 | Robert Virves | 100 |
| 1 | 2 | Roope Korhonen | 94 |
| | 3 | Léo Rossel | 81 |
| | 4 | Alejandro Cachón | 74 |
| | 5 | Nikolay Gryazin | 64 |

Challenger Co-drivers' Standings
| Move | Pos. | Driver | Points |
|---|---|---|---|
| 2 | 1 | Jakko Viilo | 75 |
| 1 | 2 | Anssi Viinikka | 99 |
| 1 | 3 | Guillaume Mercoiret | 85 |
| | 4 | Konstantin Aleksandrov | 67 |
| | 5 | Luca Guglielmetti | 56 |

=== WRC3 Rally3 ===
==== Classification ====
| Position | | No. | Driver | Co-driver | Entrant | Car | Time | Difference | Points |
| Event | Class | No. | Driver | Co-driver | Entrant | Car | Time | Difference | Points |
|---|---|---|---|---|---|---|---|---|---|
| 26 | 1 | 66 | Gil Membrado | Adrián Pérez | Gil Membrado | Ford Fiesta Rally3 | 2:48:29.0 | 0.0 | 25 |
| 28 | 2 | 54 | Matteo Fontana | Alessandro Arnaboldi | Matteo Fontana | Ford Fiesta Rally3 | 2:48:33.7 | +4.7 | 17 |
| 29 | 3 | 56 | Tymoteusz Abramowski | Jakub Wróbel | Tymoteusz Abramowski | Ford Fiesta Rally3 | 2:48:34.8 | +5.8 | 15 |
| 31 | 4 | 58 | Jarkko Nikara | Tomiya Maekawa | Toyota Gazoo Racing WRT NG | Renault Clio Rally3 | 2:49:52.4 | +1:23.4 | 12 |
| 32 | 5 | 69 | Kerem Kazaz | Corentin Silvestre | Team Petrol Ofisi | Ford Fiesta Rally3 | 2:51:00.9 | +2:31.9 | 10 |
| 34 | 6 | 61 | Ville Pynnönen | Niklas Heino | Ville Pynnönen | Renault Clio Rally3 | 2:53:00.0 | +4:31.0 | 8 |
| 35 | 7 | 65 | Ali Türkkan | Bilge Ayan | Castrol Ford Team Türkiye | Ford Fiesta Rally3 | 2:54:58.7 | +6:29.7 | 6 |
| 36 | 8 | 62 | Riku Tahko | Markus Soininen | Riku Tahko | Ford Fiesta Rally3 | 2:55:18.2 | +6:49.2 | 4 |
| 41 | 9 | 63 | Ismo Leikola | Tuomo Hannonen | Ismo Leikola | Ford Fiesta Rally3 | 3:09:33.5 | +21:04.5 | 2 |
| 43 | 10 | 59 | Rio Ogata | Mikael Korhonen | Toyota Gazoo Racing WRT NG | Renault Clio Rally3 | 3:27:33.0 | +39:04.0 | 1 |
| 48 | 11 | 57 | Nataniel Bruun | Pablo Olmos | Nataniel Bruun | Ford Fiesta Rally3 | 4:09:47.3 | +1:21:18.3 | 0 |
| Retired SS3 | | 60 | Kanta Yanaguida | Juho Koski-Lammi | Toyota Gazoo Racing WRT NG | Renault Clio Rally3 | Rolled | | 0 |

==== Special stages ====
| Stage | Winners | Car | Time | Class leaders |
|---|---|---|---|---|
| SD | Kazaz / Silvestre | Ford Fiesta Rally3 | 2:28.6 | —N/a |
| SS1 | Ogata / Korhonen | Renault Clio Rally3 | 2:20.0 | Ogata / Korhonen |
| SS2 | Abramowski / Wróbel | Ford Fiesta Rally3 | 9:25.6 | Türkkan / Albaykar |
| SS3 | Kazaz / Silvestre | Ford Fiesta Rally3 | 8:11.5 | Türkkan / Albaykar |
| SS4 | Nikara / Maekawa | Renault Clio Rally3 | 9:32.7 | Abramowski / Wróbel |
| SS5 | Abramowski / Wróbel | Ford Fiesta Rally3 | 5:28.5 | Abramowski / Wróbel |
| SS6 | Fontana / Arnaboldi | Ford Fiesta Rally3 | 10:20.5 | Abramowski / Wróbel |
| SS7 | Fontana / Arnaboldi | Ford Fiesta Rally3 | 8:34.1 | Abramowski / Wróbel |
| SS8 | Nikara / Maekawa | Renault Clio Rally3 | 10:13.9 | Membrado / Pérez |
| SS9 | Türkkan / Albaykar | Ford Fiesta Rally3 | 5:46.1 | Membrado / Pérez |
| SS10 | Fontana / Arnaboldi | Ford Fiesta Rally3 | 2:25.2 | Membrado / Pérez |
| SS11 | Türkkan / Albaykar | Ford Fiesta Rally3 | 8:49.4 | Membrado / Pérez |
| SS12 | Fontana / Arnaboldi | Ford Fiesta Rally3 | 5:34.1 | Membrado / Pérez |
| SS13 | Türkkan / Albaykar | Ford Fiesta Rally3 | 9:29.6 | Membrado / Pérez |
| SS14 | stage cancelled | | | |
| SS15 | Türkkan / Albaykar | Ford Fiesta Rally3 | 8:45.0 | Membrado / Pérez |
| SS16 | Türkkan / Albaykar | Ford Fiesta Rally3 | 5:26.9 | Membrado / Pérez |
| SS17 | stage cancelled | | | |
| SS18 | Türkkan / Albaykar | Ford Fiesta Rally3 | 8:09.2 | Membrado / Pérez |
| SS19 | Abramowski / Wróbel | Ford Fiesta Rally3 | 15:14.0 | Membrado / Pérez |
| SS20 | Fontana / Arnaboldi | Ford Fiesta Rally3 | 15:08.5 | Membrado / Pérez |

==== Championship standings ====
Drivers' Standings
| Move | Pos. | Driver | Points |
|---|---|---|---|
| | 1 | Matteo Fontana | 117 |
| 1 | 2 | Gil Membrado | 91 |
| 1 | 3 | Tymoteusz Abramowski | 91 |
| | 4 | Nicolas Otto | 56 |
| | 5 | Ghjuvanni Rossi | 55 |

Co-drivers' Standings
| Move | Pos. | Driver | Points |
|---|---|---|---|
| | 1 | Alessandro Arnaboldi | 117 |
| 1 | 2 | Adrián Pérez | 91 |
| 1 | 3 | Jakub Wróbel | 91 |
| | 4 | Oytun Albayrak | 56 |
| | 5 | Kylian Sarmezan | 55 |

=== Junior WRC Rally3 ===
==== Classification ====
| Position | | No. | Driver | Co-driver | Entrant | Car | Time | Difference | Points | |
| Event | Class | No. | Driver | Co-driver | Entrant | Car | Time | Difference | Class | Stage |
|---|---|---|---|---|---|---|---|---|---|---|
| 26 | 1 | 66 | Gil Membrado | Adrián Pérez | Gil Membrado | Ford Fiesta Rally3 | 2:48:29.0 | 0.0 | 25 | 2 |
| 27 | 2 | 67 | Leevi Lassila | Mikko Lukka | Leevi Lassila | Ford Fiesta Rally3 | 2:48:31.0 | +2.0 | 17 | 3 |
| 30 | 3 | 64 | Calle Carlberg | Jørgen Eriksen | Calle Carlberg | Ford Fiesta Rally3 | 2:49:33.7 | +1:04.7 | 15 | 4 |
| 32 | 4 | 69 | Kerem Kazaz | Corentin Silvestre | Team Petrol Ofisi | Ford Fiesta Rally3 | 2:51:00.9 | +2:31.9 | 12 | 1 |
| 35 | 5 | 65 | Ali Türkkan | Bilge Ayan | Castrol Ford Team Türkiye | Ford Fiesta Rally3 | 2:54:58.7 | +6:29.7 | 10 | 8 |
| Retired SS5 | | 68 | Craig Rahill | Conor Smith | Motorsport Ireland Rally Academy | Ford Fiesta Rally3 | Rolled | | 0 | 0 |

==== Special stages ====
| Stage | Winners | Car | Time | Class leaders |
|---|---|---|---|---|
| SD | Kazaz / Silvestre | Ford Fiesta Rally3 | 2:28.6 | —N/a |
| SS1 | Kazaz / Silvestre | Ford Fiesta Rally3 | 2:21.9 | Kazaz / Silvestre |
| SS2 | Kazaz / Silvestre | Ford Fiesta Rally3 | 9:26.2 | Kazaz / Silvestre |
| SS3 | Lassila / Lukka | Ford Fiesta Rally3 | 8:10.7 | Kazaz / Silvestre |
| SS4 | Carlberg / Eriksen | Ford Fiesta Rally3 | 9:32.5 | Lassila / Lukka |
| SS5 | Lassila / Lukka | Ford Fiesta Rally3 | 5:30.7 | Lassila / Lukka |
| SS6 | Kazaz / Silvestre | Ford Fiesta Rally3 | 10:41.4 | Membrado / Pérez |
| SS7 | Türkkan / Albaykar | Ford Fiesta Rally3 | 8:38.1 | Membrado / Pérez |
| SS8 | Membrado / Pérez | Ford Fiesta Rally3 | 10:14.1 | Membrado / Pérez |
| SS9 | Türkkan / Albaykar | Ford Fiesta Rally3 | 5:46.1 | Membrado / Pérez |
| SS10 | Lassila / Lukka | Ford Fiesta Rally3 | 2:26.4 | Membrado / Pérez |
| SS11 | Türkkan / Albaykar | Ford Fiesta Rally3 | 8:49.4 | Membrado / Pérez |
| SS12 | Carlberg / Eriksen | Ford Fiesta Rally3 | 5:32.9 | Membrado / Pérez |
| SS13 | Carlberg / Eriksen | Ford Fiesta Rally3 | 9:23.4 | Membrado / Pérez |
| SS14 | stage cancelled | | | |
| SS15 | Türkkan / Albaykar | Ford Fiesta Rally3 | 8:45.0 | Membrado / Pérez |
| SS16 | Türkkan / Albaykar | Ford Fiesta Rally3 | 5:26.9 | Membrado / Pérez |
| SS17 | stage cancelled | | | |
| SS18 | Türkkan / Albaykar | Ford Fiesta Rally3 | 8:09.2 | Membrado / Pérez |
| SS19 | Carlberg / Eriksen | Ford Fiesta Rally3 | 15:18.9 | Lassila / Lukka |
| SS20 | Membrado / Pérez | Ford Fiesta Rally3 | 15:11.9 | Membrado / Pérez |

==== Championship standings ====
Drivers' Standings
| Move | Pos. | Driver | Points |
|---|---|---|---|
| | 1 | Calle Carlberg | 95 |
| | 2 | Ali Türkkan | 92 |
| | 3 | Gil Membrado | 71 |
| | 4 | Leevi Lassila | 61 |
| | 5 | Raúl Hernández | 36 |

Co-drivers' Standings
| Move | Pos. | Driver | Points |
|---|---|---|---|
| | 1 | Jørgen Eriksen | 95 |
| | 2 | Oytun Albaykar | 74 |
| 1 | 3 | Adrián Pérez | 71 |
| 1 | 4 | Mikko Lukka | 61 |
| | 5 | José Murado | 36 |

| Previous rally: 2026 Rally Estonia | 2026 FIA World Rally Championship | Next rally: 2026 Rally del Paraguay |
| Previous rally: 2025 Rally Finland | 2026 Rally Finland | Next rally: 2027 Rally Finland |
