= 2026 Rally Estonia =

16th edition of the Rally Estonia

2026 Rally Estonia Delfi Rally Estonia 2026
Round 9 of 13 in the 2026 World Rally Championship
← Previous event	Next event →
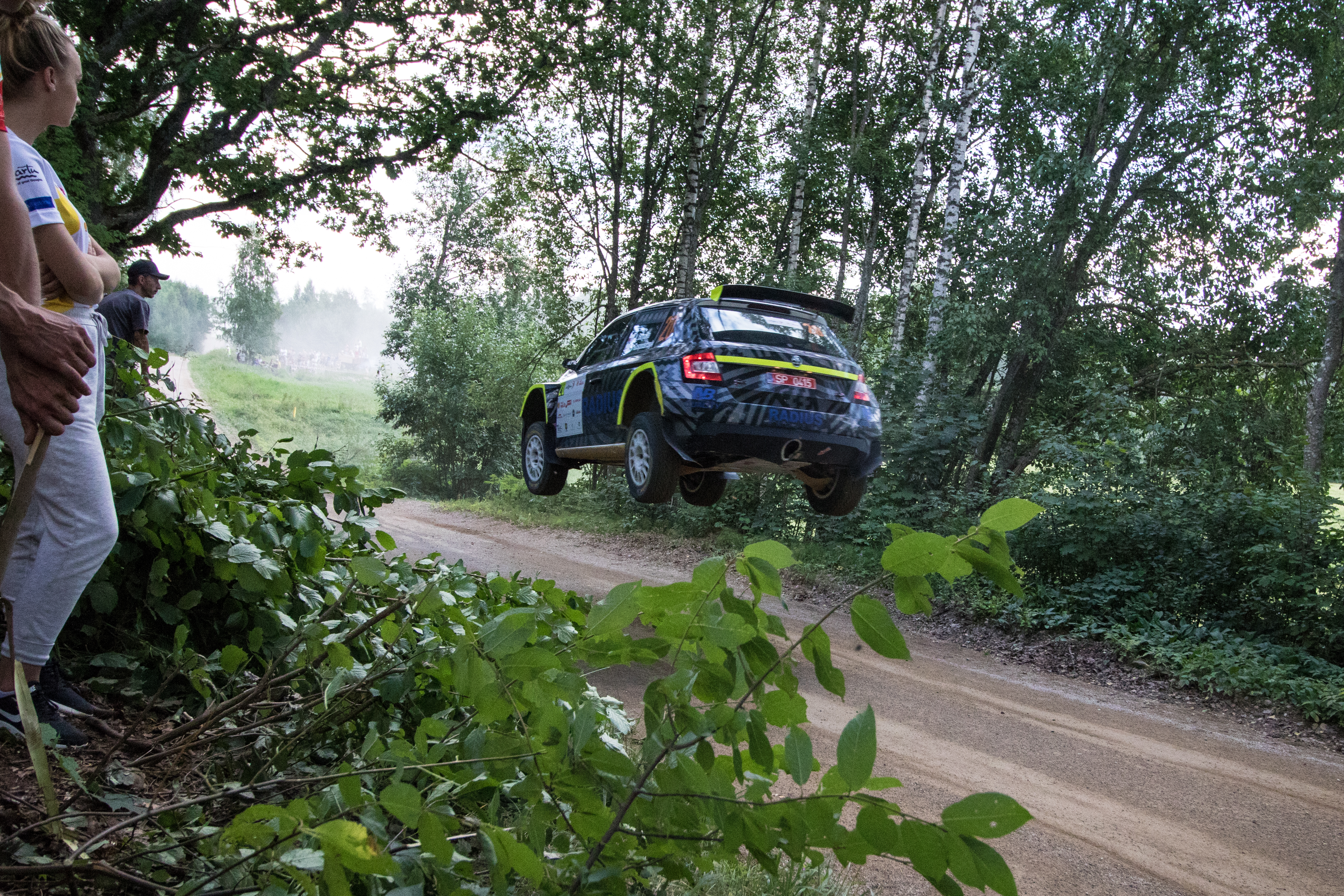
- Rally Estonia is the biggest motorsport event in the Baltic states.
- Host country: Estonia
- Rally base: Tartu, Tartu County
- Dates run: 16 – 19 July 2026
- Start location: Tartu, Tartu County
- Finish location: Kääriku, Otepää Parish, Valga County
- Stages: 18 (301.80 km; 187.53 miles)
- Stage surface: Gravel
- Transport distance: 720.56 km (447.74 miles)
- Overall distance: 1,022.36 km (635.27 miles)

Statistics
- Crews registered: 53
- Crews: 50 at start, 46 at finish

Overall results
- Overall winner: (Finland) Sami Pajari (Finland) Marko Salminen (Japan) Toyota Gazoo Racing WRT2; 2:31:16.5
- Sunday Accumulated leader: (Sweden) Oliver Solberg (United Kingdom) Elliott Edmondson (Japan) Toyota Gazoo Racing WRT; 22:37.0
- Power Stage winner: (Sweden) Oliver Solberg (United Kingdom) Elliott Edmondson (Japan) Toyota Gazoo Racing WRT; 11:11.9

Support category results
- WRC-2 winner: (Estonia) Robert Virves (Estonia) Jakko Viilo (Germany) Toksport WRT; 2:39:49.6
- WRC-3 winner: (Poland) Tymoteusz Abramowski (Poland) Jakub Wróbel; 2:52:35.5

The 2026 Rally Estonia (also known as the Delfi Rally Estonia 2026) was a motor racing event for rally cars held over four days from 16 to 19 July 2026. It marked the sixteenth running of the Rally Estonia, and was the ninth round of the 2026 World Rally Championship, 2026 WRC2 Championship and 2026 WRC3 Championship. The 2026 event was based in Tartu in Tartu County, and was consisted of eighteen special stages, covering a total competitive distance of 301.80 km (187.53 mi).

Oliver Solberg and Elliott Edmondson were the defending rally winners, and their team, Toyota Gazoo Racing WRT, were the defending manufacturer's winners. Robert Virves and Jakko Viilo were the defending rally winners in the WRC2 championship. Takumi Matsushita and Ville Mannisenmäki were the defending rally winners in the WRC3 championship.

Sami Pajari and Marko Salminen took the first victory of their careers, and Toyota successfully defended their manufacturer's title. Virves and Viilo successfully defended their titles in the WRC2 category. Tymoteusz Abramowski and Jakub Wróbel were the winners in the WRC3 category.

== Background ==
=== Entry list ===
The following crews entered into the rally. The event was open to crews competing in the World Rally Championship, its support categories, the WRC2 Championship, the WRC3 Championship and privateer entries that were not registered to score points in any championship. Eleven crews entered under Rally1 regulations, as were twenty-four Rally2 crews in the WRC2 Championship and ten Rally3 crews in the WRC3 Championship.

Rally1 entries competing in the World Rally Championship
No.	Driver	Co-Driver	Entrant	Car	Championship eligibility	Tyre
1	(France) Sébastien Ogier	(France) Vincent Landais	(Japan) Toyota Gazoo Racing WRT	Toyota GR Yaris Rally1	Driver, Co-driver, Manufacturer	H
4	(Finland) Esapekka Lappi	(Finland) Enni Mälkönen	(South Korea) Hyundai Shell Mobis WRT	Hyundai i20 N Rally1	Driver, Co-driver, Manufacturer	H
5	(Finland) Sami Pajari	(Finland) Marko Salminen	(Japan) Toyota Gazoo Racing WRT2	Toyota GR Yaris Rally1	Driver, Co-driver, Manufacturer, Team	H
11	(Belgium) Thierry Neuville	(Belgium) Martijn Wydaeghe	(South Korea) Hyundai Shell Mobis WRT	Hyundai i20 N Rally1	Driver, Co-driver, Manufacturer	H
16	(France) Adrien Fourmaux	(France) Alexandre Coria	(South Korea) Hyundai Shell Mobis WRT	Hyundai i20 N Rally1	Driver, Co-driver, Manufacturer	H
18	(Japan) Takamoto Katsuta	(Republic of Ireland) Aaron Johnston	(Japan) Toyota Gazoo Racing WRT	Toyota GR Yaris Rally1	Driver, Co-driver	H
22	(Latvia) Mārtiņš Sesks	(Latvia) Renārs Francis	(United Kingdom) M-Sport Ford WRT	Ford Puma Rally1	Driver, Co-driver	H
33	(United Kingdom) Elfyn Evans	(United Kingdom) Scott Martin	(Japan) Toyota Gazoo Racing WRT	Toyota GR Yaris Rally1	Driver, Co-driver, Manufacturer	H
55	(Republic of Ireland) Josh McErlean	(Republic of Ireland) Eoin Treacy	(United Kingdom) M-Sport Ford WRT	Ford Puma Rally1	Driver, Co-driver, Manufacturer	H
95	(Republic of Ireland) Jon Armstrong	(Republic of Ireland) Shane Byrne	(United Kingdom) M-Sport Ford WRT	Ford Puma Rally1	Driver, Co-driver, Manufacturer	H
99	(Sweden) Oliver Solberg	(United Kingdom) Elliott Edmondson	(Japan) Toyota Gazoo Racing WRT	Toyota GR Yaris Rally1	Driver, Co-driver, Manufacturer	H

Rally2 entries competing in the WRC2 Championship
No.	Driver	Co-Driver	Entrant	Car	Championship eligibility	Tyre
20	(Finland) Roope Korhonen	(Finland) Anssi Viinikka	(Finland) Rautio Motorsport	Toyota GR Yaris Rally2	Challenger Driver, Challenger Co-driver	H
21	(Finland) Teemu Suninen	(Finland) Janni Hussi	(Finland) Teemu Suninen	Toyota GR Yaris Rally2	Driver, Co-driver	H
23	(Estonia) Robert Virves	(Estonia) Jakko Viilo	(Germany) Toksport WRT	Škoda Fabia RS Rally2	Challenger Driver, Challenger Co-driver, Team	H
24	(Paraguay) Fabrizio Zaldivar	(Italy) Marcelo Der Ohannesian	(Paraguay) Fabrizio Zaldivar	Škoda Fabia RS Rally2	Challenger Driver, Challenger Co-driver	H
25	(Finland) Emil Lindholm	(Brazil) Gabriel Morales	(Germany) Toksport WRT	Škoda Fabia RS Rally2	Driver, Co-driver, Team	H
27	(Spain) Jan Solans	(Spain) Rodrigo Sanjuan de Eusebio	(Spain) PH.Ph	Toyota GR Yaris Rally2	Challenger Driver, Challenger Co-driver	H
28	(Finland) Lauri Joona	(Finland) Antti Linnaketo	(Finland) Lauri Joona	Škoda Fabia RS Rally2	Challenger Driver, Challenger Co-driver	H
29	(Japan) Yuki Yamamoto	(Republic of Ireland) James Fulton	(Finland) Printsport	Toyota GR Yaris Rally2	Challenger Driver, Co-driver	H
30	(France) Arthur Pelamourges	(France) Bastien Pouget	(France) Arthur Pelamourges	Hyundai i20 N Rally2	Challenger Driver, Challenger Co-driver	H
31	(Sweden) Mille Johansson	(Sweden) Johan Grönvall	(Sweden) Mille Johansson	Škoda Fabia RS Rally2	Challenger Driver, Challenger Co-driver	H
32	(Italy) Giovanni Trentin	(Italy) Pietro Elia Ometto	(Italy) MT Racing SRL	Škoda Fabia RS Rally2	Challenger Driver, Challenger Co-driver	H
34	(Netherlands) Bernhard ten Brinke	(United Kingdom) Tom Woodburn	(Netherlands) Bernhard ten Brinke	Toyota GR Yaris Rally2	Challenger Driver, Challenger Co-driver	H
35	(Estonia) Romet Jürgenson	(Estonia) Siim Oja	(United Kingdom) M-Sport Ford WRT	Ford Fiesta Rally2	Challenger Driver, Challenger Co-driver	H
36	(Estonia) Jaspar Vaher	(Estonia) Rait Jansen	(Japan) Toyota Gazoo Racing NG	Toyota GR Yaris Rally2	Challenger Driver, Challenger Co-driver	H
37	(Finland) Mikko Heikkilä	(Finland) Kristian Temonen	(Finland) Mikko Heikkilä	Škoda Fabia RS Rally2	Challenger Driver, Challenger Co-driver	H
38	(Estonia) Patrick Enok	(Estonia) Silver Simm	(Finland) Printsport	Škoda Fabia RS Rally2	Challenger Driver, Challenger Co-driver	H
39	(Estonia) Egon Kaur	(Estonia) Ermo Veltson	(Estonia) Egon Kaur	Škoda Fabia RS Rally2	Challenger Driver, Challenger Co-driver	H
41	(Estonia) Joosep Ralf Nõgene	(Estonia) Aleks Lesk	(Estonia) Joosep Ralf Nõgene	Toyota GR Yaris Rally2	Challenger Driver, Challenger Co-driver	H
42	(Finland) Tuukka Kauppinen	(Finland) Sebastian Virtanen	(Finland) Rautio Motorsport	Toyota GR Yaris Rally2	Challenger Driver, Challenger Co-driver	H
43	(Japan) Takumi Matsushita	(Finland) Pekka Kelander	(Japan) Toyota Gazoo Racing NG	Toyota GR Yaris Rally2	Challenger Driver, Challenger Co-driver	H
44	(Japan) Shotaro Goto	(Finland) Jussi Lindberg	(Japan) Toyota Gazoo Racing NG	Toyota GR Yaris Rally2	Challenger Driver, Challenger Co-driver	H
45	(Austria) Johannes Keferböck	(Austria) Ilka Minor	(Austria) Johannes Keferböck	Toyota GR Yaris Rally2	Challenger/Masters Driver, Masters Co-driver	H
46	(Turkey) Uğur Soylu	(Turkey) Mehmet Akif Yalçın	(Turkey) GP Garage My Team	Škoda Fabia RS Rally2	Challenger/Masters Driver, Challenger Co-driver	H
47	(Peru) Jorge Martínez	(Argentina) Marcelo Brizio	(Peru) Jorge Martínez	Hyundai i20 N Rally2	Challenger/Masters Driver, Challenger/Masters Co-driver	H

Rally3 entries competing in the WRC3 Championship
No.	Driver	Co-Driver	Entrant	Car	Tyre
48	(Japan) Rio Ogata	(Finland) Mikael Korhonen	(Japan) Toyota Gazoo Racing WRT NG	Renault Clio Rally3	H
49	(Japan) Kanta Yanaguida	(Finland) Juho Koski-Lammi	(Japan) Toyota Gazoo Racing WRT NG	Renault Clio Rally3	H
50	(Poland) Tymoteusz Abramowski	(Poland) Jakub Wróbel	(Poland) Tymoteusz Abramowski	Ford Fiesta Rally3	H
51	(Bolivia) Nataniel Bruun	(Argentina) Pablo Olmos	(Bolivia) Nataniel Bruun	Ford Fiesta Rally3	H
52	(Estonia) Priit Koik	(Estonia) Allan Birjukov	(Estonia) Priit Koik	Renault Clio Rally3	H
53	(Turkey) Kerem Kazaz	(France) Corentin Silvestre	(Turkey) Team Petrol Ofisi	Ford Fiesta Rally3	H
54	(Finland) Jarkko Nikara	(Japan) Tomiya Maekawa	(Japan) Toyota Gazoo Racing WRT NG	Renault Clio Rally3	H
56	(Poland) Grzegorz Bonder	(Poland) Kamil Heller	(Poland) Grzegorz Bonder	Ford Fiesta Rally3	H
57	(Germany) Nicolas Otto Boehringer	(Portugal) Hugo Magalhães	(Germany) Nicolas Otto Boehringer	Ford Fiesta Rally3	H
58	(Peru) André Martinez	(Argentina) Matias Aranguren	(Peru) André Martinez	Ford Fiesta Rally3	H

Other major entries
No.	Driver	Co-Driver	Entrant	Car	Tyre
26	(United Kingdom) Gus Greensmith	(Sweden) Jonas Andersson	(United Kingdom) Gus Greensmith	Toyota GR Yaris Rally2	H
40	(Estonia) Karl Martin Volver	(Estonia) Annika Sõna	(Estonia) Karl Martin Volver	Toyota GR Yaris Rally2	H
59	(Estonia) Urmo Aava	(Estonia) Silver Kütt	(Estonia) RedGrey Team	Toyota GR Yaris Rally2	H

=== Itinerary ===
All dates and times are EEST (UTC+3).

Date	No.	Time span	Stage name	Distance
17 July	—	After 9:01	Kastre [Shakedown]	4.08 km
17 July		After 12:10	Opening ceremony, Tartu	—N/a
17 July	SS1	After 13:03	Raanitsa 1	21.45 km
17 July	SS2	After 13:56	Karaski 1	11.97 km
17 July	SS3	After 14:49	Kanepi 1	17.43 km
17 July		15:29 – 15:48	Regroup, Tehvandi	—N/a
17 July		15:48 – 16:03	Tyre fitting zone, Tehvandi	—N/a
17 July	SS4	After 16:46	Raanitsa 2	21.45 km
17 July	SS5	After 17:39	Karaski 2	11.97 km
17 July	SS6	After 18:32	Kanepi 2	17.43 km
17 July	SS7	After 19:35	Elva Linn	1.72 km
17 July		20:45 – 21:30	Flexi service A, Raadi	—N/a
18 July	SS8	After 9:56	Peipsiääre 1	24.35 km
18 July	SS9	After 10:49	Mustvee 1	10.67 km
18 July	SS10	After 12:10	Peipsiääre 2	24.35 km
18 July	SS11	After 13:03	Mustvee 2	10.67 km
18 July		14:03 – 14:18	Regroup, Raadi	—N/a
18 July		14:18 – 14:48	Service B, Raadi	—N/a
18 July	SS12	After 15:48	Kambja 1	23.74 km
18 July		16:23 – 16:44	Regroup, Tehvandi	—N/a
18 July	SS13	After 17:05	Otepää 1	15.16 km
18 July	SS14	After 17:58	Kambja 2	23.74 km
18 July		18:33 – 18:44	Regroup, Tehvandi	—N/a
18 July	SS15	After 19:05	Otepää 2	15.16 km
18 July	SS16	After 20:35	Tartu vald	1.76 km
18 July		21:03 – 21:48	Flexi service C, Raadi	—N/a
19 July	SS17	After 11:05	Kääriku 1	24.39 km
19 July		11:50 – 12:37	Regroup, Tehvandi	—N/a
19 July	SS18	After 13:15	Kääriku 2 [Power Stage]	24.39 km
19 July		After 14:20	Podium ceremony, Kääriku	—N/a
19 July		After 16:20	Finish	—N/a

== Report ==
=== WRC Rally1 ===
==== Classification ====
Position		No.	Driver	Co-driver	Entrant	Car	Time	Difference	Points			
Event	Class	No.	Driver	Co-driver	Entrant	Car	Time	Difference	Event	Sunday	Stage	Total
1	1	5	Sami Pajari	Marko Salminen	Toyota Gazoo Racing WRT2	Toyota GR Yaris Rally1	2:31:16.5	0.0	25	3	0	28
2	2	99	Oliver Solberg	Elliott Edmondson	Toyota Gazoo Racing WRT	Toyota GR Yaris Rally1	2:31:36.0	+19.5	17	5	5	27
3	3	16	Adrien Fourmaux	Alexandre Coria	Hyundai Shell Mobis WRT	Hyundai i20 N Rally1	2:32:10.3	+53.8	15	1	0	16
4	4	11	Thierry Neuville	Martijn Wydaeghe	Hyundai Shell Mobis WRT	Hyundai i20 N Rally1	2:32:16.2	+59.7	12	0	4	16
5	5	1	Sébastien Ogier	Vincent Landais	Toyota Gazoo Racing WRT	Toyota GR Yaris Rally1	2:32:49.4	+1:32.9	10	2	2	14
6	6	33	Elfyn Evans	Scott Martin	Toyota Gazoo Racing WRT	Toyota GR Yaris Rally1	2:33:17.5	+2:01.0	8	4	3	15
7	7	22	Mārtiņš Sesks	Renārs Francis	M-Sport Ford WRT	Ford Puma Rally1	2:33:51.8	+2:35.3	6	0	0	6
8	8	4	Esapekka Lappi	Enni Mälkönen	Hyundai Shell Mobis WRT	Hyundai i20 N Rally1	2:34:18.8	+3:02.3	4	0	0	4
9	9	95	Jon Armstrong	Shane Byrne	M-Sport Ford WRT	Ford Puma Rally1	2:34:44.5	+3:28.0	2	0	0	2
10	21	18	Takamoto Katsuta	Aaron Johnston	Toyota Gazoo Racing WRT	Toyota GR Yaris Rally1	2:44:40.1	+13:23.6	0	0	1	1
11	43	55	Josh McErlean	Eoin Treacy	M-Sport Ford WRT	Ford Puma Rally1	3:53:11.5	+1:21:55.0	0	0	0	0

==== Special stages ====
Stage	Winners	Car	Time	Class leaders
SD	Pajari / Salminen	Toyota GR Yaris Rally1	1:55.6	—N/a
SS1	Pajari / Salminen	Toyota GR Yaris Rally1	10:04.0	Pajari / Salminen
SS2	Pajari / Salminen	Toyota GR Yaris Rally1	5:56.8	Pajari / Salminen
SS3	Pajari / Salminen	Toyota GR Yaris Rally1	8:26.0	Pajari / Salminen
SS4	Pajari / Salminen	Toyota GR Yaris Rally1	9:49.2	Pajari / Salminen
SS5	Pajari / Salminen	Toyota GR Yaris Rally1	5:48.9	Pajari / Salminen
SS6	Pajari / Salminen	Toyota GR Yaris Rally1	8:12.4	Pajari / Salminen
SS7	Pajari / Salminen	Toyota GR Yaris Rally1	1:26.2	Pajari / Salminen
SS8	Pajari / Salminen	Toyota GR Yaris Rally1	12:58.2	Pajari / Salminen
SS9	Pajari / Salminen	Toyota GR Yaris Rally1	5:26.1	Pajari / Salminen
SS10	Solberg / Edmondson	Toyota GR Yaris Rally1	12:50.4	Pajari / Salminen
SS11	Solberg / Edmondson	Toyota GR Yaris Rally1	5:19.9	Pajari / Salminen
SS12	Pajari / Salminen	Toyota GR Yaris Rally1	12:36.2	Pajari / Salminen
SS13	Pajari / Salminen	Toyota GR Yaris Rally1	7:45.1	Pajari / Salminen
SS14	Pajari / Salminen	Toyota GR Yaris Rally1	12:23.6	Pajari / Salminen
SS15	Neuville / Wydaeghe	Hyundai i20 N Rally1	7:38.5	Pajari / Salminen
SS16	Solberg / Edmondson	Toyota GR Yaris Rally1	1:45.9	Pajari / Salminen
SS17	Solberg / Edmondson	Toyota GR Yaris Rally1	11:25.1	Pajari / Salminen
SS18	Solberg / Edmondson	Toyota GR Yaris Rally1	11:11.9	Pajari / Salminen

==== Championship standings ====
Drivers' Standings
Move	Pos.	Driver	Points
	1	Elfyn Evans	177
	2	Takamoto Katsuta	152
1	3	Sami Pajari	144
1	4	Sébastien Ogier	139
	5	Oliver Solberg	130

Co-drivers' Standings
Move	Pos.	Driver	Points
	1	Scott Martin	177
	2	Aaron Johnston	152
1	3	Marko Salminen	144
1	4	Vincent Landais	139
	5	Elliott Edmondson	130

Manufacturers' Standings
Move	Pos.	Driver	Points
	1	Toyota Gazoo Racing WRT	464
	2	Hyundai Shell Mobis WRT	308
	3	Toyota Gazoo Racing WRT2	157
	4	M-Sport Ford WRT	116

=== WRC2 Rally2 ===
==== Classification ====
Position		No.	Driver	Co-driver	Entrant	Car	Time	Difference	Points	
Event	Class	No.	Driver	Co-driver	Entrant	Car	Time	Difference	Class	Event
10	1	23	Robert Virves	Jakko Viilo	Toksport WRT	Škoda Fabia RS Rally2	2:39:49.6	0.0	25	1
11	2	21	Teemu Suninen	Janni Hussi	Teemu Suninen	Toyota GR Yaris Rally2	2:39:57.2	+7.6	17	0
12	3	20	Roope Korhonen	Anssi Viinikka	Rautio Motorsport	Toyota GR Yaris Rally2	2:39:58.4	+8.8	15	0
13	4	25	Emil Lindholm	Gabriel Morales	Toksport WRT	Škoda Fabia RS Rally2	2:40:40.9	+51.3	12	0
14	5	31	Mille Johansson	Johan Grönvall	Mille Johansson	Škoda Fabia RS Rally2	2:41:38.0	+1:48.4	10	0
15	6	38	Patrick Enok	Silver Simm	Printsport	Škoda Fabia RS Rally2	2:41:52.0	+2:02.4	8	0
17	7	28	Lauri Joona	Antti Linnaketo	Lauri Joona	Škoda Fabia RS Rally2	2:42:01.1	+2:11.5	6	0
18	8	35	Romet Jürgenson	Siim Oja	M-Sport Ford WRT	Ford Fiesta Rally2	2:42:03.5	+2:13.9	4	0
19	9	41	Joosep Ralf Nõgene	Aleks Lesk	Joosep Ralf Nõgene	Toyota GR Yaris Rally2	2:42:20.5	+2:30.9	2	0
22	10	43	Takumi Matsushita	Pekka Kelander	Toyota Gazoo Racing NG	Toyota GR Yaris Rally2	2:44:42.2	+4:52.6	1	0
24	11	44	Shotaro Goto	Jussi Lindberg	Toyota Gazoo Racing NG	Toyota GR Yaris Rally2	2:45:54.0	+6:04.4	0	0
25	12	32	Giovanni Trentin	Pietro Elia Ometto	MT Racing SRL	Škoda Fabia RS Rally2	2:46:29.5	+6:39.9	0	0
26	13	24	Fabrizio Zaldivar	Marcelo Der Ohannesian	Fabrizio Zaldivar	Škoda Fabia RS Rally2	2:47:58.4	+8:08.8	0	0
27	14	42	Tuukka Kauppinen	Sebastian Virtanen	Rautio Motorsport	Toyota GR Yaris Rally2	2:49:15.1	+9:25.5	0	0
28	15	30	Arthur Pelamourges	Bastien Pouget	Arthur Pelamourges	Hyundai i20 N Rally2	2:51:38.1	+11:48.5	0	0
31	16	29	Yuki Yamamoto	James Fulton	Printsport	Toyota GR Yaris Rally2	3:02:35.1	+22:45.5	0	0
33	17	34	Bernhard ten Brinke	Tom Woodburn	Bernhard ten Brinke	Toyota GR Yaris Rally2	3:03:09.0	+23:19.4	0	0
34	18	45	Johannes Keferböck	Ilka Minor	Johannes Keferböck	Toyota GR Yaris Rally2	3:06:31.9	+26:42.3	0	0
38	19	46	Uğur Soylu	Mehmet Akif Yalçın	GP Garage My Team	Škoda Fabia RS Rally2	3:21:38.0	+41:48.4	0	0
39	20	27	Jan Solans	Rodrigo Sanjuan de Eusebio	PH.Ph	Toyota GR Yaris Rally2	3:32:21.6	+52:32.0	0	0
Retired SS18		37	Mikko Heikkilä	Kristian Temonen	Mikko Heikkilä	Škoda Fabia RS Rally2	Damper		0	0
Retired SS8		36	Jaspar Vaher	Rait Jansen	Toyota Gazoo Racing NG	Toyota GR Yaris Rally2	Accident		0	0
Retired SS4		39	Egon Kaur	Ermo Veltson	Egon Kaur	Škoda Fabia RS Rally2	Accident		0	0

==== Special stages ====
Overall
Stage	Winners	Car	Time	Class leaders
SD	Virves / Viilo	Škoda Fabia RS Rally2	2:02.8	—N/a
SS1	Heikkilä / Temonen	Škoda Fabia RS Rally2	10:35.1	Heikkilä / Temonen
SS2	Virves / Viilo	Škoda Fabia RS Rally2	6:13.2	Virves / Viilo
SS3	Vaher / Jansen	Toyota GR Yaris Rally2	8:49.3	Virves / Viilo
SS3	Heikkilä / Temonen	Škoda Fabia RS Rally2	8:49.3	Virves / Viilo
SS4	Suninen / Hussi	Toyota GR Yaris Rally2	10:23.4	Virves / Viilo
SS5	Virves / Viilo	Škoda Fabia RS Rally2	6:07.1	Virves / Viilo
SS6	Korhonen / Viinikka	Toyota GR Yaris Rally2	8:41.0	Virves / Viilo
SS7	Korhonen / Viinikka	Toyota GR Yaris Rally2	1:29.4	Virves / Viilo
SS8	Korhonen / Viinikka	Toyota GR Yaris Rally2	13:43.9	Virves / Viilo
SS9	Lindholm / Morales	Škoda Fabia RS Rally2	5:44.8	Virves / Viilo
SS10	Kauppinen / Virtanen	Toyota GR Yaris Rally2	13:37.7	Virves / Viilo
SS11	Virves / Viilo	Škoda Fabia RS Rally2	5:41.2	Virves / Viilo
SS12	Teemu Suninen / Janni Hussi	Toyota GR Yaris Rally2	13:12.4	Virves / Viilo
SS13	Teemu Suninen / Janni Hussi	Toyota GR Yaris Rally2	8:09.8	Virves / Viilo
SS14	Virves / Viilo	Škoda Fabia RS Rally2	13:03.0	Virves / Viilo
SS15	Korhonen / Viinikka	Toyota GR Yaris Rally2	8:04.6	Virves / Viilo
SS16	Virves / Viilo	Škoda Fabia RS Rally2	1:48.8	Virves / Viilo
SS17	Korhonen / Viinikka	Toyota GR Yaris Rally2	12:06.0	Virves / Viilo
SS18	Virves / Viilo	Škoda Fabia RS Rally2	11:58.0	Virves / Viilo

Challenger
Stage	Winners	Car	Time	Class leaders
SD	Virves / Viilo	Škoda Fabia RS Rally2	2:02.8	—N/a
SS1	Heikkilä / Temonen	Škoda Fabia RS Rally2	10:35.1	Heikkilä / Temonen
SS2	Virves / Viilo	Škoda Fabia RS Rally2	6:13.2	Virves / Viilo
SS3	Vaher / Jansen	Toyota GR Yaris Rally2	8:49.3	Virves / Viilo
SS3	Heikkilä / Temonen	Škoda Fabia RS Rally2	8:49.3	Virves / Viilo
SS4	Vaher / Jansen	Toyota GR Yaris Rally2	10:24.4	Virves / Viilo
SS5	Virves / Viilo	Škoda Fabia RS Rally2	6:07.1	Virves / Viilo
SS6	Korhonen / Viinikka	Toyota GR Yaris Rally2	8:41.0	Virves / Viilo
SS7	Korhonen / Viinikka	Toyota GR Yaris Rally2	1:29.4	Virves / Viilo
SS8	Korhonen / Viinikka	Toyota GR Yaris Rally2	13:43.9	Virves / Viilo
SS9	Lindholm / Morales	Škoda Fabia RS Rally2	5:44.8	Virves / Viilo
SS10	Kauppinen / Virtanen	Toyota GR Yaris Rally2	13:37.7	Virves / Viilo
SS11	Virves / Viilo	Škoda Fabia RS Rally2	5:41.2	Virves / Viilo
SS12	Korhonen / Viinikka	Toyota GR Yaris Rally2	13:13.2	Virves / Viilo
SS13	Virves / Viilo	Škoda Fabia RS Rally2	8:10.0	Virves / Viilo
SS14	Virves / Viilo	Škoda Fabia RS Rally2	13:03.0	Virves / Viilo
SS15	Korhonen / Viinikka	Toyota GR Yaris Rally2	8:04.6	Virves / Viilo
SS16	Virves / Viilo	Škoda Fabia RS Rally2	1:48.8	Virves / Viilo
SS17	Korhonen / Viinikka	Toyota GR Yaris Rally2	12:06.0	Virves / Viilo
SS18	Virves / Viilo	Škoda Fabia RS Rally2	11:58.0	Virves / Viilo

==== Championship standings ====
Drivers' Standings
Move	Pos.	Driver	Points
	1	Roope Korhonen	79
4	2	Robert Virves	75
1	3	Alejandro Cachón	61
1	4	Léo Rossel	60
3	5	Teemu Suninen	59

Co-drivers' Standings
Move	Pos.	Driver	Points
	1	Anssi Viinikka	79
4	2	Jakko Viilo	75
1	3	Borja Rozada	61
1	4	Guillaume Mercoiret	60
3	5	Arnaud Dunand	59

Manufacturers' Standings
Move	Pos.	Driver	Points
	1	Toksport WRT	210
	2	Lancia Corse HF	163
	3	M-Sport Ford WRT	45
New entry	4	2C Junior Team	15

Challenger Drivers' Standings
Move	Pos.	Driver	Points
	1	Roope Korhonen	94
3	2	Robert Virves	75
1	3	Léo Rossel	75
1	4	Alejandro Cachón	74
1	5	Nikolay Gryazin	64

Challenger Co-drivers' Standings
Move	Pos.	Driver	Points
	1	Anssi Viinikka	99
	2	Guillaume Mercoiret	79
2	3	Jakko Viilo	75
1	4	Konstantin Aleksandrov	67
1	5	Luca Guglielmetti	56

=== WRC3 Rally3 ===
==== Classification ====
Position		No.	Driver	Co-driver	Entrant	Car	Time	Difference	Points
Event	Class	No.	Driver	Co-driver	Entrant	Car	Time	Difference	Points
29	1	50	Tymoteusz Abramowski	Jakub Wróbel	Tymoteusz Abramowski	Ford Fiesta Rally3	2:52:35.5	0.0	25
30	2	57	Nicolas Otto Boehringer	Hugo Magalhães	Nicolas Otto Boehringer	Ford Fiesta Rally3	3:00:33.0	+7:57.5	17
37	3	58	André Martinez	Matias Aranguren	André Martinez	Ford Fiesta Rally3	3:13:43.6	+21:08.1	15
41	4	51	Nataniel Bruun	Pablo Olmos	Nataniel Bruun	Ford Fiesta Rally3	3:39:26.3	+46:50.8	12
42	5	49	Kanta Yanaguida	Juho Koski-Lammi	Toyota Gazoo Racing WRT NG	Renault Clio Rally3	3:42:37.5	+50:02.0	10
44	6	53	Kerem Kazaz	Corentin Silvestre	Team Petrol Ofisi	Ford Fiesta Rally3	4:06:52.4	+1:14:16.9	8
46	7	54	Jarkko Nikara	Tomiya Maekawa	Toyota Gazoo Racing WRT NG	Renault Clio Rally3	4:22:32.6	+1:29:57.1	6
Retired SS3		48	Rio Ogata	Mikael Korhonen	Toyota Gazoo Racing WRT NG	Renault Clio Rally3	Accident		0
Did not start		52	Priit Koik	Allan Birjukov	Priit Koik	Renault Clio Rally3	Accident		0

==== Special stages ====
Stage	Winners	Car	Time	Class leaders
SD	Abramowski / Wróbel	Ford Fiesta Rally3	2:13.9	—N/a
SS1	Ogata / Korhonen	Renault Clio Rally3	11:16.5	Ogata / Korhonen
SS2	Ogata / Korhonen	Renault Clio Rally3	6:36.7	Ogata / Korhonen
SS3	Abramowski / Wróbel	Ford Fiesta Rally3	9:24.7	Abramowski / Wróbel
SS4	Abramowski / Wróbel	Ford Fiesta Rally3	11:15.2	Abramowski / Wróbel
SS5	Nikara / Maekawa	Renault Clio Rally3	11:15.2	Abramowski / Wróbel
SS6	Nikara / Maekawa	Renault Clio Rally3	9:22.2	Abramowski / Wróbel
SS7	Abramowski / Wróbel	Ford Fiesta Rally3	1:32.9	Abramowski / Wróbel
SS8	Abramowski / Wróbel	Ford Fiesta Rally3	14:47.6	Abramowski / Wróbel
SS9	Ogata / Korhonen	Renault Clio Rally3	6:08.3	Abramowski / Wróbel
SS10	Ogata / Korhonen	Renault Clio Rally3	14:51.0	Abramowski / Wróbel
SS11	Abramowski / Wróbel	Ford Fiesta Rally3	6:08.8	Abramowski / Wróbel
SS12	Abramowski / Wróbel	Ford Fiesta Rally3	14:09.6	Abramowski / Wróbel
SS13	Abramowski / Wróbel	Ford Fiesta Rally3	8:48.4	Abramowski / Wróbel
SS14	Abramowski / Wróbel	Ford Fiesta Rally3	14:11.0	Abramowski / Wróbel
SS15	Bruun / Olmos	Ford Fiesta Rally3	8:45.7	Abramowski / Wróbel
SS16	Bruun / Olmos	Ford Fiesta Rally3	1:53.2	Abramowski / Wróbel
SS17	Yanaguida / Koski-Lammi	Renault Clio Rally3	13:00.4	Abramowski / Wróbel
SS18	Yanaguida / Koski-Lammi	Renault Clio Rally3	12:49.6	Abramowski / Wróbel

==== Championship standings ====
Drivers' Standings
Move	Pos.	Driver	Points
	1	Matteo Fontana	100
2	2	Tymoteusz Abramowski	76
1	3	Gil Membrado	66
4	4	Nicolas Otto	56
2	5	Ghjuvanni Rossi	55

Co-drivers' Standings
Move	Pos.	Driver	Points
	1	Alessandro Arnaboldi	100
2	2	Jakub Wróbel	76
1	3	Adrián Pérez	66
3	4	Oytun Albayrak	56
2	5	Kylian Sarmezan	55

Previous rally: 2026 Acropolis Rally	2026 FIA World Rally Championship	Next rally: 2026 Rally Finland
Previous rally: 2025 Rally Estonia	2026 Rally Estonia	Next rally: 2027 Rally Estonia
