= 2025 Rally Estonia =

15th edition of the Rally Estonia

2025 Rally Estonia WRC Delfi Rally Estonia 2025
Round 8 of 14 in the 2025 World Rally Championship
← Previous event	Next event →
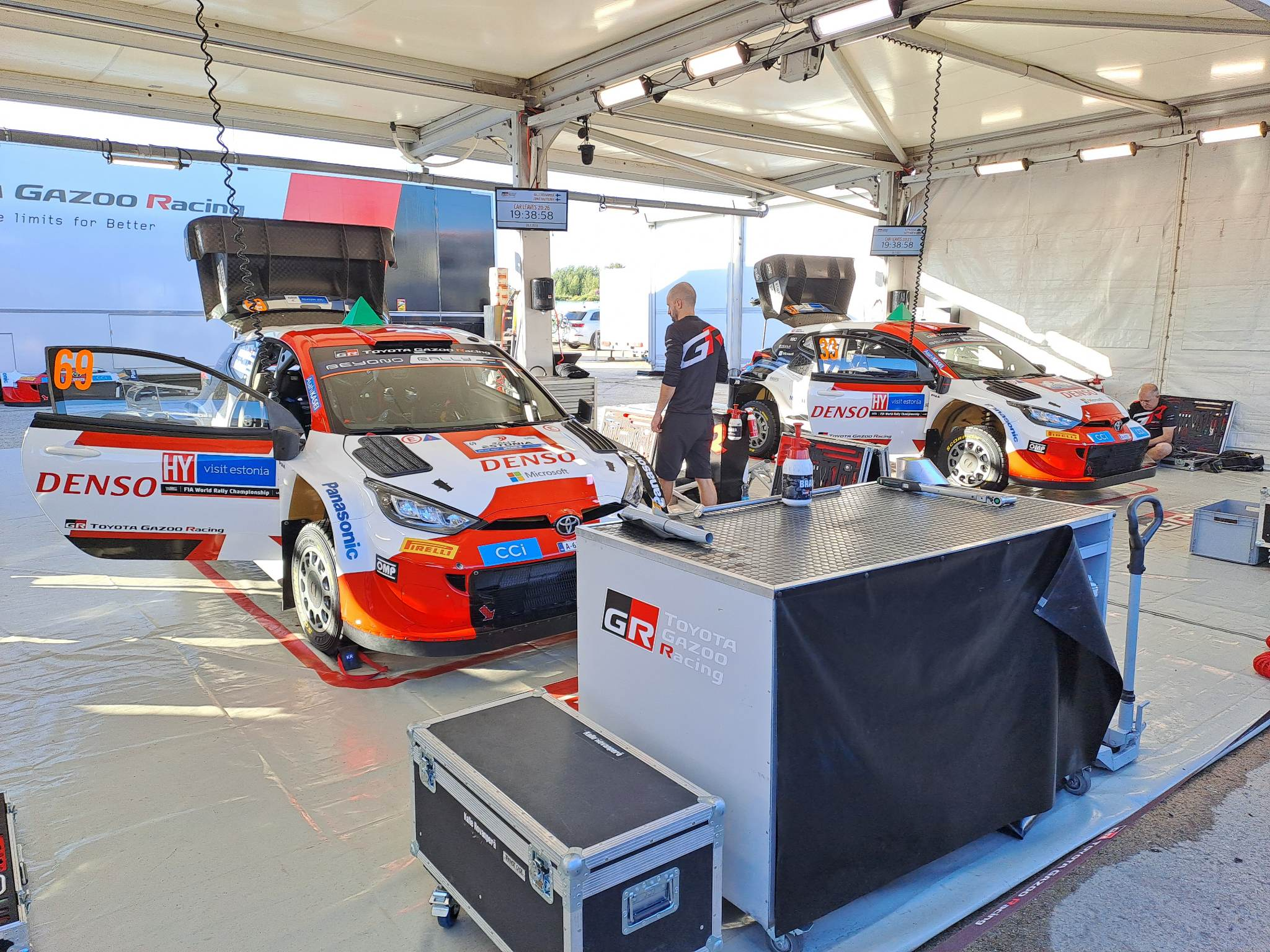
- Rally Estonia is the biggest motorsport event in the Baltic states.
- Host country: Estonia
- Rally base: Tartu, Tartu County
- Dates run: 17 – 20 July 2025
- Start location: Tartu, Tartu County
- Finish location: Kääriku, Otepää Parish, Valga County
- Stages: 20 (308.35 km; 191.60 miles)
- Stage surface: Gravel
- Transport distance: 932.19 km (579.24 miles)
- Overall distance: 1,240.54 km (770.84 miles)

Statistics
- Crews registered: 41
- Crews: 37 at start, 30 at finish

Overall results
- Overall winner: (Sweden) Oliver Solberg (United Kingdom) Elliott Edmondson (Japan) Toyota Gazoo Racing WRT; 2:36:35.1
- Sunday Accumulated leader: (Sweden) Oliver Solberg (United Kingdom) Elliott Edmondson (Japan) Toyota Gazoo Racing WRT; 28:29.7
- Power Stage winner: (Finland) Kalle Rovanperä (Finland) Jonne Halttunen (Japan) Toyota Gazoo Racing WRT; 11:12.5

Support category results
- WRC-2 winner: (Estonia) Robert Virves (Estonia) Jakko Viilo (Germany) Toksport WRT; 2:45:18.5
- WRC-3 winner: (Japan) Takumi Matsushita (Finland) Ville Mannisenmäki (Japan) Toyota Gazoo Racing WRT NG; 3:00:39.2

The 2025 Rally Estonia (also known as the WRC Delfi Rally Estonia 2025) was a motor racing event for rally cars held over four days from 17 to 20 July 2025. It marked the fifteenth running of the Rally Estonia, and was the eighth round of the 2025 World Rally Championship, 2025 WRC2 Championship and 2025 WRC3 Championship. The 2025 event was based in Tartu in Tartu County and was contested over twenty special stages, covering a total competitive distance of 308.35 km (191.60 mi).

Kalle Rovanperä and Jonne Halttunen were the defending rally winners, and their team, Toyota Gazoo Racing WRT, were the defending manufacturer's winners. Andreas Mikkelsen and Torstein Eriksen were the defending rally winners in the WRC2 category. Roope Korhonen and Anssi Viinikka were the defending rally winners in the WRC3 category.

Oliver Solberg and Elliott Edmondson claimed their maiden rally victory, and their team, Toyota, successfully defended their titles. Robert Virves and Jakko Viilo were the winners in the WRC2 category. Takumi Matsushita and Ville Mannisenmäki were the winners in the WRC3 category.

== Background ==
=== Entry list ===
The following crews entered into the rally. The event was opened to crews competing in the World Rally Championship, its support categories, the WRC2 Championship, the WRC3 Championship and privateer entries that were not registered to score points in any championship. Eleven entered under Rally1 regulations, as were twenty Rally2 crews in the WRC2 Championship and eight Rally3 crew in the WRC3 Championship.

Rally1 entries competing in the World Rally Championship
No.	Driver	Co-Driver	Entrant	Car	Championship eligibility	Tyre
1	(Belgium) Thierry Neuville	(Belgium) Martijn Wydaeghe	(South Korea) Hyundai Shell Mobis WRT	Hyundai i20 N Rally1	Driver, Co-driver, Manufacturer	H
5	(Finland) Sami Pajari	(Finland) Marko Salminen	(Japan) Toyota Gazoo Racing WRT2	Toyota GR Yaris Rally1	Driver, Co-driver, Manufacturer, Team	H
8	(Estonia) Ott Tänak	(Estonia) Martin Järveoja	(South Korea) Hyundai Shell Mobis WRT	Hyundai i20 N Rally1	Driver, Co-driver, Manufacturer	H
13	(Luxembourg) Grégoire Munster	(Belgium) Louis Louka	(United Kingdom) M-Sport Ford WRT	Ford Puma Rally1	Driver, Co-driver, Manufacturer	H
16	(France) Adrien Fourmaux	(France) Alexandre Coria	(South Korea) Hyundai Shell Mobis WRT	Hyundai i20 N Rally1	Driver, Co-driver, Manufacturer	H
18	(Japan) Takamoto Katsuta	(Republic of Ireland) Aaron Johnston	(Japan) Toyota Gazoo Racing WRT	Toyota GR Yaris Rally1	Driver, Co-driver, Manufacturer	H
22	(Latvia) Mārtiņš Sesks	(Latvia) Renārs Francis	(United Kingdom) M-Sport Ford WRT	Ford Puma Rally1	Driver, Co-driver	H
33	(United Kingdom) Elfyn Evans	(United Kingdom) Scott Martin	(Japan) Toyota Gazoo Racing WRT	Toyota GR Yaris Rally1	Driver, Co-driver, Manufacturer	H
55	(Republic of Ireland) Josh McErlean	(Republic of Ireland) Eoin Treacy	(United Kingdom) M-Sport Ford WRT	Ford Puma Rally1	Driver, Co-driver, Manufacturer	H
69	(Finland) Kalle Rovanperä	(Finland) Jonne Halttunen	(Japan) Toyota Gazoo Racing WRT	Toyota GR Yaris Rally1	Driver, Co-driver, Manufacturer	H
99	(Sweden) Oliver Solberg	(United Kingdom) Elliott Edmondson	(Japan) Toyota Gazoo Racing WRT	Toyota GR Yaris Rally1	Driver, Co-driver	H

Rally2 entries competing in the WRC2 Championship
No.	Driver	Co-Driver	Entrant	Car	Championship eligibility	Tyre
21	(Finland) Roope Korhonen	(Finland) Anssi Viinikka	(Finland) Roope Korhonen	Toyota GR Yaris Rally2	Challenger Driver, Challenger Co-driver	H
23	(Paraguay) Fabrizio Zaldivar	(Italy) Marcelo Der Ohannesian	(Germany) Toksport WRT	Škoda Fabia RS Rally2	Team	H
24	(Finland) Lauri Joona	(Finland) Samu Vaaleri	(Finland) Lauri Joona	Škoda Fabia RS Rally2	Challenger Driver, Challenger Co-driver	H
25	(Finland) Mikko Heikkilä	(Finland) Kristian Temonen	(Finland) Mikko Heikkilä	Škoda Fabia RS Rally2	Challenger Driver, Challenger Co-driver	H
26	(Estonia) Romet Jürgenson	(Estonia) Siim Oja	FIA Rally Star	Ford Fiesta Rally2	Challenger Driver, Challenger Co-driver	H
27	(Bulgaria) Nikolay Gryazin	(Kyrgyzstan) Konstantin Aleksandrov	(Germany) Toksport WRT	Škoda Fabia RS Rally2	Challenger Driver, Challenger Co-driver, Team	H
28	(Spain) Diego Ruiloba	(Spain) Ángel Vela	(Spain) Diego Ruiloba	Citroën C3 Rally2	Challenger Driver, Challenger Co-driver	H
29	(Estonia) Robert Virves	(Estonia) Jakko Viilo	(Germany) Toksport WRT	Škoda Fabia RS Rally2	Challenger Driver, Challenger Co-driver, Team	H
30	(Bolivia) Marco Bulacia	(Spain) Diego Vallejo	(Bolivia) Marco Bulacia	Toyota GR Yaris Rally2	Challenger Driver, Challenger Co-driver	H
31	(Japan) Yuki Yamamoto	(Republic of Ireland) James Fulton	(Japan) Toyota Gazoo Racing WRT NG	Toyota GR Yaris Rally2	Challenger Driver, Challenger Co-driver, Team	H
32	(Mexico) Alejandro Mauro	(Spain) Adrián Pérez	(Mexico) Alejandro Mauro	Škoda Fabia RS Rally2	Challenger Driver, Challenger Co-driver	H
34	(Estonia) Georg Linnamäe	(United Kingdom) James Morgan	(Estonia) Georg Linnamäe	Toyota GR Yaris Rally2	Challenger Driver, Challenger Co-driver	H
35	(Estonia) Egon Kaur	(Estonia) Ermo Veltson	(Estonia) Egon Kaur	Škoda Fabia RS Rally2	Challenger Driver, Challenger Co-driver	H
36	(Finland) Tuukka Kauppinen	(Finland) Sebastian Virtanen	(Finland) Tuukka Kauppinen	Toyota GR Yaris Rally2	Challenger Driver, Challenger Co-driver	H
37	(Estonia) Joosep Ralf Nõgene	(Estonia) Aleks Lesk	(Estonia) Joosep Ralf Nõgene	Toyota GR Yaris Rally2	Challenger Driver, Challenger Co-driver	H
38	(Paraguay) Miguel Zaldivar	(Argentina) Luis Allende	(Germany) Toksport WRT	Škoda Fabia RS Rally2	Challenger Driver, Challenger Co-driver	H
39	(Japan) Hikaru Kogure	(Finland) Topi Matias Luhtinen	(Japan) Toyota Gazoo Racing WRT NG	Toyota GR Yaris Rally2	Challenger Driver, Challenger Co-driver, Team	H
40	(Germany) Fabio Schwarz	(Austria) Bernhard Ettel	(Germany) Armin Schwarz Driving Experience	Toyota GR Yaris Rally2	Challenger Driver, Challenger Co-driver	H
41	(Netherlands) Bernhard ten Brinke	(United Kingdom) Tom Woodburn	(Netherlands) Bernhard ten Brinke	Škoda Fabia RS Rally2	Challenger Driver, Challenger Co-driver	H
42	(Turkey) Uğur Soylu	(Turkey) Sener Güray	(Turkey) GP Garage My Team	Škoda Fabia RS Rally2	Challenger/Masters Driver, Challenger Co-driver	H

Rally3 entries competing in the WRC3 Championship
No.	Driver	Co-Driver	Entrant	Car	Tyre
43	(France) Arthur Pelamourges	(France) Bastien Pouget	(France) Arthur Pelamourges	Renault Clio Rally3	H
44	(Bolivia) Nataniel Bruun	(Argentina) Pablo Olmos	(Bolivia) Nataniel Bruun	Ford Fiesta Rally3	H
45	(Japan) Takumi Matsushita	(Finland) Ville Mannisenmäki	(Japan) Toyota Gazoo Racing WRT NG	Renault Clio Rally3	H
46	(Turkey) Kerem Kazaz	(France) Corentin Silvestre	(Turkey) Team Petrol Ofisi	Ford Fiesta Rally3	H
47	(Peru) André Martinez	(Argentina) Matias Aranguren	(Peru) André Martinez	Ford Fiesta Rally3	H
48	(Japan) Shotaro Goto	(Finland) Jussi Lindberg	(Japan) Toyota Gazoo Racing WRT NG	Renault Clio Rally3	H
49	(Poland) Tymoteusz Abramowski	(Poland) Jakub Wróbel	(Poland) Tymoteusz Abramowski	Ford Fiesta Rally3	H
50	(Poland) Grzegorz Bonder	(Poland) Łukasz Jastrzębski	(Poland) Grzegorz Bonder	Ford Fiesta Rally3	H

=== Itinerary ===
All dates and times are EEST (UTC+3).

Date	No.	Time span	Stage name	Distance
17 July	—	After 9:01	Kastre [Shakedown]	4.08 km
17 July		After 18:30	Opening ceremony, Tartu	—N/a
17 July	SS1	After 20:05	Tartu vald 1	1.76 km
17 July		20:30 – 20:45	Flexi service A, Raadi	—N/a
18 July	SS2	After 9:16	Peipsiääre 1	24.35 km
18 July	SS3	After 10:09	Mustvee 1	11.37 km
18 July	SS4	After 11:53	Peipsiääre 2	24.35 km
18 July	SS5	After 12:46	Mustvee 2	11.37 km
18 July		13:46 – 14:46	Regroup, Raadi	—N/a
18 July		14:01 – 14:41	Service B, Raadi	—N/a
18 July	SS6	After 15:44	Kambja 1	23.74 km
18 July		19:31 – 19:41	Regroup, Raadi	—N/a
18 July	SS7	After 18:04	Kambja 2	23.74 km
18 July	SS8	After 19:15	Elva Linn	1.72 km
18 July		20:35 – 21:20	Flexi service C, Raadi	—N/a
19 July	SS9	After 8:23	Raanitsa 1	21.45 km
19 July	SS10	After 9:16	Kanepi 1	17.43 km
19 July		9:51 – 10:06	Regroup, Tehvandi	—N/a
19 July	SS11	After 10:54	Raanitsa 2	21.45 km
19 July	SS12	After 11:47	Kanepi 2	17.43 km
19 July		13:02 – 13:22	Regroup, Raadi	—N/a
19 July		13:22 – 14:02	Service D, Raadi	—N/a
19 July	SS13	After 15:05	Otepää 1	11.15 km
19 July	SS14	After 16:00	Karaski 1	11.97 km
19 July		16:50 – 17:17	Regroup, Tehvandi	—N/a
19 July	SS15	After 17:35	Otepää 2	11.15 km
19 July	SS16	After 18:30	Karaski 2	11.97 km
19 July	SS18	After 19:51	Tartu vald 2	1.76 km
19 July		20:26 – 21:11	Flexi service E, Raadi	—N/a
20 July	SS18	After 9:39	Hellenurme	11.79 km
20 July	SS19	After 10:35	Kääriku 1	24.20 km
20 July		11:25 – 12:45	Regroup, Tehvandi	—N/a
20 July	SS20	After 13:15	Kääriku 2 [Power Stage]	24.20 km
20 July		After 14:20	Podium ceremony, Kääriku	—N/a
20 July		After 16:00	Finish	—N/a

== Report ==
=== WRC Rally1 ===
==== Classification ====
Position		No.	Driver	Co-driver	Entrant	Car	Time	Difference	Points			
Event	Class	No.	Driver	Co-driver	Entrant	Car	Time	Difference	Event	Sunday	Stage	Total
1	1	99	Oliver Solberg	Elliott Edmondson	Toyota Gazoo Racing WRT	Toyota GR Yaris Rally1	4:12:20.1	0.0	25	5	3	33
2	2	8	Ott Tänak	Martin Järveoja	Hyundai Shell Mobis WRT	Hyundai i20 N Rally1	4:37:00.3	+25.2	17	3	4	24
3	3	1	Thierry Neuville	Martijn Wydaeghe	Hyundai Shell Mobis WRT	Hyundai i20 N Rally1	2:37:23.4	+48.3	15	1	2	18
4	4	69	Kalle Rovanperä	Jonne Halttunen	Toyota Gazoo Racing WRT	Toyota GR Yaris Rally1	2:37:30.7	+55.6	12	4	5	21
5	5	16	Adrien Fourmaux	Alexandre Coria	Hyundai Shell Mobis WRT	Hyundai i20 N Rally1	2:38:08.1	+1:33.0	10	0	0	10
6	6	33	Elfyn Evans	Scott Martin	Toyota Gazoo Racing WRT	Toyota GR Yaris Rally1	2:38:18.5	+1:43.4	8	2	1	11
7	7	5	Sami Pajari	Marko Salminen	Toyota Gazoo Racing WRT2	Toyota GR Yaris Rally1	2:39:30.7	+2:55.6	6	0	0	6
8	8	22	Mārtiņš Sesks	Renārs Francis	M-Sport Ford WRT	Ford Puma Rally1	2:40:11.1	+3:36.0	4	0	0	4
9	9	55	Josh McErlean	Eoin Treacy	M-Sport Ford WRT	Ford Puma Rally1	2:42:04.9	+5:29.8	2	0	0	2
10	10	13	Grégoire Munster	Louis Louka	M-Sport Ford WRT	Ford Puma Rally1	2:42:32.6	+5:57.5	1	0	0	1
Retired SS20		18	Takamoto Katsuta	Aaron Johnston	Toyota Gazoo Racing WRT	Toyota GR Yaris Rally1	Mechanical		0	0	0	0

==== Special stages ====
Stage	Winners	Car	Time	Class leaders
SD	Rovanperä / Halttunen	Toyota GR Yaris Rally1	1:56.3	—N/a
SS1	Neuville / Wydaeghe	Hyundai i20 N Rally1	1:42.9	Neuville / Wydaeghe
SS2	Solberg / Edmondson	Toyota GR Yaris Rally1	13:09.0	Solberg / Edmondson
SS3	Tänak / Järveoja	Hyundai i20 N Rally1	5:54.1	Solberg / Edmondson
SS4	Solberg / Edmondson	Toyota GR Yaris Rally1	12:57.6	Solberg / Edmondson
SS5	Tänak / Järveoja	Hyundai i20 N Rally1	5:46.7	Solberg / Edmondson
SS6	Fourmaux / Coria	Hyundai i20 N Rally1	12:51.6	Solberg / Edmondson
SS7	Solberg / Edmondson	Toyota GR Yaris Rally1	12:36.7	Solberg / Edmondson
SS8	Neuville / Wydaeghe	Hyundai i20 N Rally1	1:26.6	Solberg / Edmondson
SS8	Katsuta / Johnston	Toyota GR Yaris Rally1	1:26.6	Solberg / Edmondson
SS9	Solberg / Edmondson	Toyota GR Yaris Rally1	10:06.2	Solberg / Edmondson
SS10	Solberg / Edmondson	Toyota GR Yaris Rally1	8:21.2	Solberg / Edmondson
SS11	Solberg / Edmondson	Toyota GR Yaris Rally1	9:57.0	Solberg / Edmondson
SS12	Tänak / Järveoja	Hyundai i20 N Rally1	8:15.2	Solberg / Edmondson
SS13	Neuville / Wydaeghe	Hyundai i20 N Rally1	5:43.2	Solberg / Edmondson
SS14	Tänak / Järveoja	Hyundai i20 N Rally1	5:56.3	Solberg / Edmondson
SS15	Solberg / Edmondson	Toyota GR Yaris Rally1	5:37.4	Solberg / Edmondson
SS16	Tänak / Järveoja	Hyundai i20 N Rally1	5:50.4	Solberg / Edmondson
SS17	Neuville / Wydaeghe	Hyundai i20 N Rally1	1:41.8	Solberg / Edmondson
SS18	Solberg / Edmondson	Toyota GR Yaris Rally1	5:46.0	Solberg / Edmondson
SS19	Solberg / Edmondson	Toyota GR Yaris Rally1	11:28.7	Solberg / Edmondson
SS20	Rovanperä / Halttunen	Toyota GR Yaris Rally1	11:12.5	Solberg / Edmondson

==== Championship standings ====
Drivers' Standings
Move	Pos.	Driver	Points
2	1	Ott Tänak	162
1	2	Elfyn Evans	161
1	3	Sébastien Ogier	141
	4	Kalle Rovanperä	138
	5	Thierry Neuville	114

Co-drivers' Standings
Move	Pos.	Driver	Points
2	1	Martin Järveoja	162
1	2	Scott Martin	161
1	3	Vincent Landais	141
	4	Jonne Halttunen	138
	5	Martijn Wydaeghe	114

Manufacturers' Standings
Move	Pos.	Driver	Points
	1	Toyota Gazoo Racing WRT	399
	2	Hyundai Shell Mobis WRT	347
	3	M-Sport Ford WRT	111
	4	Toyota Gazoo Racing WRT2	68

=== WRC2 Rally2 ===
==== Classification ====
Position		No.	Driver	Co-driver	Entrant	Car	Time	Difference	Points	
Event	Class	No.	Driver	Co-driver	Entrant	Car	Time	Difference	Class	Event
11	1	44	Robert Virves	Jakko Viilo	Toksport WRT	Škoda Fabia RS Rally2	2:45:18.5	0.0	25	0
12	2	34	Georg Linnamäe	James Morgan	Georg Linnamäe	Toyota GR Yaris Rally2	2:45:36.9	+18.4	17	0
13	3	21	Roope Korhonen	Anssi Viinikka	Roope Korhonen	Toyota GR Yaris Rally2	2:46:07.9	+49.4	15	0
14	4	25	Mikko Heikkilä	Kristian Temonen	Mikko Heikkilä	Škoda Fabia RS Rally2	2:46:11.2	+52.7	12	0
15	5	26	Romet Jürgenson	Siim Oja	FIA Rally Star	Ford Fiesta Rally2	2:46:30.0	+1:11.5	10	0
16	6	31	Lauri Joona	Samu Vaaleri	Lauri Joona	Škoda Fabia RS Rally2	2:46:54.5	+1:36.0	8	0
17	7	31	Yuki Yamamoto	James Fulton	Toyota Gazoo Racing WRT NG	Toyota GR Yaris Rally2	2:47:24.8	+2:06.3	6	0
18	8	37	Joosep Ralf Nõgene	Aleks Lesk	Joosep Ralf Nõgene	Toyota GR Yaris Rally2	2:48:26.9	+3:08.4	4	0
20	9	28	Diego Ruiloba	Ángel Vela	Diego Ruiloba	Citroën C3 Rally2	2:59:16.9	+13:58.4	1	0
21	10	41	Bernhard ten Brinke	Tom Woodburn	Bernhard ten Brinke	Škoda Fabia RS Rally2	3:00:35.6	+15:17.1	0	0
27	11	36	Tuukka Kauppinen	Sebastian Virtanen	Tuukka Kauppinen	Toyota GR Yaris Rally2	3:40:06.8	+54:48.3	0	0
Retired SS15		42	Marco Bulacia	Diego Vallejo	Marco Bulacia	Toyota GR Yaris Rally2	Accident		0	0
Retired SS12		35	Egon Kaur	Ermo Veltson	Egon Kaur	Škoda Fabia RS Rally2	Retired		0	0
Retired SS4		38	Miguel Zaldivar	Luis Allende	Toksport WRT	Škoda Fabia RS Rally2	Accident		0	0
Retired SS3		27	Nikolay Gryazin	Konstantin Aleksandrov	Toksport WRT	Škoda Fabia RS Rally2	Suspension		0	0

==== Special stages ====
Overall
Stage	Winners	Car	Time	Class leaders
SD	Virves / Viilo	Škoda Fabia RS Rally2	2:06.1	—N/a
SS1	Virves / Viilo	Škoda Fabia RS Rally2	1:44.1	Virves / Viilo
SS2	Virves / Viilo	Škoda Fabia RS Rally2	13:42.3	Virves / Viilo
SS3	Virves / Viilo	Škoda Fabia RS Rally2	6:07.5	Virves / Viilo
SS4	Virves / Viilo	Škoda Fabia RS Rally2	13:34.3	Virves / Viilo
SS5	Jürgenson / Oja	Ford Fiesta Rally2	6:09.5	Virves / Viilo
SS6	Virves / Viilo	Škoda Fabia RS Rally2	13:24.0	Virves / Viilo
SS7	Virves / Viilo	Škoda Fabia RS Rally2	13:16.9	Virves / Viilo
SS8	Virves / Viilo	Škoda Fabia RS Rally2	1:28.8	Virves / Viilo
SS9	Virves / Viilo	Škoda Fabia RS Rally2	10:41.2	Virves / Viilo
SS10	Heikkilä / Temonen	Škoda Fabia RS Rally2	8:50.6	Virves / Viilo
SS11	Linnamäe / Morgan	Toyota GR Yaris Rally2	10:32.2	Virves / Viilo
SS12	Heikkilä / Temonen	Škoda Fabia RS Rally2	8:42.3	Virves / Viilo
SS13	stage cancelled			
SS14	Linnamäe / Morgan	Toyota GR Yaris Rally2	6:15.0	Virves / Viilo
SS15	Linnamäe / Morgan	Toyota GR Yaris Rally2	5:59.0	Virves / Viilo
SS16	Linnamäe / Morgan	Toyota GR Yaris Rally2	6:11.2	Virves / Viilo
SS17	Jürgenson / Oja	Ford Fiesta Rally2	1:44.5	Virves / Viilo
SS18	Heikkilä / Temonen	Škoda Fabia RS Rally2	6:09.1	Virves / Viilo
SS19	Korhonen / Viinikka	Toyota GR Yaris Rally2	12:08.1	Virves / Viilo
SS20	Heikkilä / Temonen	Škoda Fabia RS Rally2	11:57.3	Virves / Viilo

Challenger
Stage	Winners	Car	Time	Class leaders
SD	Virves / Viilo	Škoda Fabia RS Rally2	2:06.1	—N/a
SS1	Virves / Viilo	Škoda Fabia RS Rally2	1:44.1	Virves / Viilo
SS2	Virves / Viilo	Škoda Fabia RS Rally2	13:42.3	Virves / Viilo
SS3	Virves / Viilo	Škoda Fabia RS Rally2	6:07.5	Virves / Viilo
SS4	Virves / Viilo	Škoda Fabia RS Rally2	13:34.3	Virves / Viilo
SS5	Jürgenson / Oja	Ford Fiesta Rally2	6:09.5	Virves / Viilo
SS6	Virves / Viilo	Škoda Fabia RS Rally2	13:24.0	Virves / Viilo
SS7	Virves / Viilo	Škoda Fabia RS Rally2	13:16.9	Virves / Viilo
SS8	Virves / Viilo	Škoda Fabia RS Rally2	1:28.8	Virves / Viilo
SS9	Virves / Viilo	Škoda Fabia RS Rally2	10:41.2	Virves / Viilo
SS10	Heikkilä / Temonen	Škoda Fabia RS Rally2	8:50.6	Virves / Viilo
SS11	Linnamäe / Morgan	Toyota GR Yaris Rally2	10:32.2	Virves / Viilo
SS12	Heikkilä / Temonen	Škoda Fabia RS Rally2	8:42.3	Virves / Viilo
SS13	stage cancelled			
SS14	Linnamäe / Morgan	Toyota GR Yaris Rally2	6:15.0	Virves / Viilo
SS15	Linnamäe / Morgan	Toyota GR Yaris Rally2	5:59.0	Virves / Viilo
SS16	Linnamäe / Morgan	Toyota GR Yaris Rally2	6:11.2	Virves / Viilo
SS17	Jürgenson / Oja	Ford Fiesta Rally2	1:44.5	Virves / Viilo
SS18	Heikkilä / Temonen	Škoda Fabia RS Rally2	6:09.1	Virves / Viilo
SS19	Korhonen / Viinikka	Toyota GR Yaris Rally2	12:08.1	Virves / Viilo
SS20	Heikkilä / Temonen	Škoda Fabia RS Rally2	11:57.3	Virves / Viilo

==== Championship standings ====
Drivers' Standings
Move	Pos.	Driver	Points
	1	Oliver Solberg	85
	2	Yohan Rossel	82
	3	Gus Greensmith	57
	4	Roberto Daprà	49
2	5	Roope Korhonen	44

Co-drivers' Standings
Move	Pos.	Driver	Points
	1	Elliott Edmondson	85
	2	Arnaud Dunand	82
	3	Jonas Andersson	57
3	4	Anssi Viinikka	44
1	5	Luca Guglielmetti	41

Manufacturers' Standings
Move	Pos.	Driver	Points
	1	PH Sport	163
2	2	Toksport WRT	89
1	3	Toyota Gazoo Racing WRT NG	89
1	4	Sarrazin Motorsport – Iron Lynx	64

Challenger Drivers' Standings
Move	Pos.	Driver	Points
	1	Roberto Daprà	71
2	2	Roope Korhonen	65
1	3	Kajetan Kajetanowicz	62
1	4	Jan Solans	55
8	5	Robert Virves	43

Challenger Co-drivers' Standings
Move	Pos.	Driver	Points
3	1	Anssi Viinikka	65
1	2	Maciej Szczepaniak	62
1	3	Luca Guglielmetti	56
1	4	Diego Sanjuan de Eusebio	55
7	5	Jakko Viilo	43

=== WRC3 Rally3 ===
==== Classification ====
Position		No.	Driver	Co-driver	Entrant	Car	Time	Difference	Points
Event	Class	No.	Driver	Co-driver	Entrant	Car	Time	Difference	Points
22	1	45	Takumi Matsushita	Ville Mannisenmäki	Toyota Gazoo Racing WRT NG	Renault Clio Rally3	3:00:39.2	0.0	25
23	2	50	Grzegorz Bonder	Łukasz Jastrzębski	Grzegorz Bonder	Ford Fiesta Rally3	3:08:22.3	+7:43.1	17
24	3	47	André Martinez	Matias Aranguren	André Martinez	Ford Fiesta Rally3	3:15:56.0	+15:16.8	15
28	4	48	Shotaro Goto	Jussi Lindberg	Toyota Gazoo Racing WRT NG	Renault Clio Rally3	3:45:08.3	+44:29.1	12
29	5	43	Arthur Pelamourges	Bastien Pouget	Arthur Pelamourges	Renault Clio Rally3	3:51:14.6	+50:35.4	10
Retired SS19		49	Tymoteusz Abramowski	Jakub Wróbel	Tymoteusz Abramowski	Ford Fiesta Rally3	Engine		0
Retired SS6		46	Kerem Kazaz	Corentin Silvestre	Team Petrol Ofisi	Ford Fiesta Rally3	Accident		0
Retired SS3		44	Nataniel Bruun	Pablo Olmos	Nataniel Bruun	Ford Fiesta Rally3	Accident		0

==== Special stages ====
Stage	Winners	Car	Time	Class leaders
SD	Abramowski / Wróbel	Ford Fiesta Rally3	2:13.0	—N/a
SS1	Abramowski / Wróbel	Ford Fiesta Rally3	1:50.2	Abramowski / Wróbel
SS2	Abramowski / Wróbel	Ford Fiesta Rally3	14:35.7	Abramowski / Wróbel
SS3	Abramowski / Wróbel	Ford Fiesta Rally3	6:35.1	Abramowski / Wróbel
SS4	Goto / Lindberg	Renault Clio Rally3	14:54.9	Abramowski / Wróbel
SS5	Matsushita / Mannisenmäki	Renault Clio Rally3	6:46.2	Abramowski / Wróbel
SS6	Abramowski / Wróbel	Ford Fiesta Rally3	14:14.2	Abramowski / Wróbel
SS7	Abramowski / Wróbel	Ford Fiesta Rally3	14:07.4	Abramowski / Wróbel
SS8	Matsushita / Mannisenmäki	Renault Clio Rally3	1:34.1	Abramowski / Wróbel
SS9	Abramowski / Wróbel	Ford Fiesta Rally3	11:20.9	Abramowski / Wróbel
SS10	Abramowski / Wróbel	Ford Fiesta Rally3	9:24.3	Abramowski / Wróbel
SS11	Abramowski / Wróbel	Ford Fiesta Rally3	11:13.6	Abramowski / Wróbel
SS12	Goto / Lindberg	Renault Clio Rally3	9:23.9	Abramowski / Wróbel
SS13	stage cancelled			
SS14	Abramowski / Wróbel	Ford Fiesta Rally3	6:41.4	Abramowski / Wróbel
SS15	Goto / Lindberg	Renault Clio Rally3	6:39.3	Matsushita / Mannisenmäki
SS16	Goto / Lindberg	Renault Clio Rally3	6:43.4	Matsushita / Mannisenmäki
SS17	Pelamourges / Pouget	Renault Clio Rally3	1:48.5	Matsushita / Mannisenmäki
SS18	Goto / Lindberg	Renault Clio Rally3	6:56.9	Matsushita / Mannisenmäki
SS19	Goto / Lindberg	Renault Clio Rally3	13:14.9	Matsushita / Mannisenmäki
SS20	Goto / Lindberg	Renault Clio Rally3	13:07.0	Matsushita / Mannisenmäki

==== Championship standings ====
Drivers' Standings
Move	Pos.	Driver	Points
	1	Taylor Gill	67
	2	Matteo Fontana	59
5	3	Takumi Matsushita	57
	4	Arthur Pelamourges	52
2	5	Kerem Kazaz	49

Co-drivers' Standings
Move	Pos.	Driver	Points
	1	Daniel Brkic	67
	2	Alessandro Arnaboldi	59
1	3	Bastien Pouget	52
1	4	Corentin Silvestre	49
	5	Oytun Albaykar	42

Previous rally: 2025 Acropolis Rally	2025 FIA World Rally Championship	Next rally: 2025 Rally Finland
Previous rally: 2024 Rally Estonia	2025 Rally Estonia	Next rally: 2026 Rally Estonia
