= Škoda Fabia RS Rally2 =

Škoda Rally2 rally car

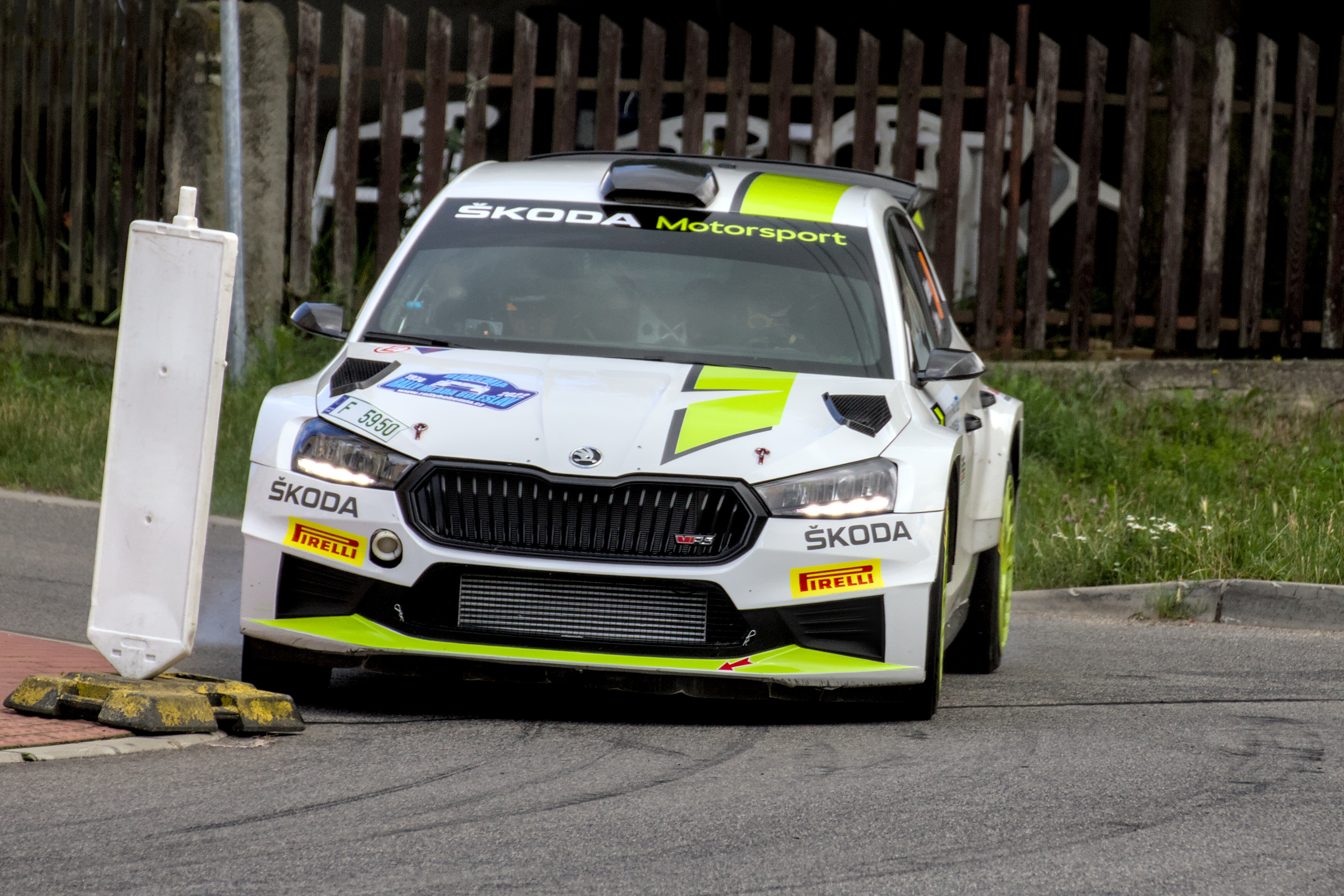
- Category: Group Rally2
- Constructor: Škoda Motorsport
- Designers: Aleš Rada (Technical Head, Škoda Motorsport)
- Predecessor: Škoda Fabia R5/Rally2 evo

Technical specifications
- Length: 3,999 mm (157.4 in)
- Width: 1,820 mm (71.7 in)
- Wheelbase: 2,563 mm (100.9 in)
- Engine: VW EA888 1.6 L (98 cu in) 4-cylinder, 16-valve turbocharged
- Transmission: 5-speed sequential 4-wheel drive
- Power: 289 hp (216 kW; 293 PS)
- Weight: 1,230 kg (2,711.7 lb)

Competition history

The Škoda Fabia RS Rally2 is a rally car built by Škoda Motorsport that is based on the fourth generation Škoda Fabia production car. It is the second upgraded generational update of the original Fabia R5, replacing the Fabia Rally2 evo.

== Development ==
Four notable drivers helped to develop the Fabia RS Rally2; Andreas Mikkelsen, UK's Kris Meeke, Czech Republic's Jan Kopecký and Finland's Emil Lindholm. The car was tested extensively on various surfaces such as gravel, snow and asphalt, and in locations such as Finland, Spain, France and Italy.

The car was launched on 14 June 2022 at a presentation at Škoda Auto headquarters in Mladá Boleslav, Czech Republic, before winning on its competitive debut on the Lausitz Rally held in Germany in November 2022 with Norwegian crew Andreas Mikkelsen and Torstein Eriksen.

== Rally victories ==
=== WRC2 ===
Year	No.	Event	Surface	Driver	Co-driver
2023	1	2023 Rally Sweden	Snow	(Sweden) Oliver Solberg	(United Kingdom) Elliott Edmondson
2023	2	2023 Rally Mexico	Gravel	(United Kingdom) Gus Greensmith	(Sweden) Jonas Andersson
2023	3	2023 Rally de Portugal	Gravel	(United Kingdom) Gus Greensmith	(Sweden) Jonas Andersson
2023	4	(Italy) 2023 Rally Italia Sardegna	Gravel	(Norway) Andreas Mikkelsen	(Norway) Torstein Eriksen
2023	5	2023 Rally Estonia	Gravel	(Norway) Andreas Mikkelsen	(Norway) Torstein Eriksen
2023	6	2023 Rally Finland	Gravel	(Finland) Sami Pajari	(Finland) Enni Mälkönen
2023	7	(Greece) 2023 Acropolis Rally	Gravel	(Norway) Andreas Mikkelsen	(Norway) Torstein Eriksen
2023	8	2023 Rally Chile	Gravel	(Sweden) Oliver Solberg	(United Kingdom) Elliott Edmondson
2023	9	(Europe) 2023 Central European Rally	Tarmac	(France) Nicolas Ciamin	(France) Yannick Roche
2023	10	2023 Rally Japan	Tarmac	(Norway) Andreas Mikkelsen	(Norway) Torstein Eriksen
2024	11	2024 Rally Sweden	Snow	(Sweden) Oliver Solberg	(United Kingdom) Elliott Edmondson
2024	12	(Kenya) 2024 Safari Rally	Gravel	(United Kingdom) Gus Greensmith	(Sweden) Jonas Andersson
2024	13	2024 Rally Latvia	Gravel	(Sweden) Oliver Solberg	(United Kingdom) Elliott Edmondson
2024	14	2024 Rally Finland	Gravel	(Sweden) Oliver Solberg	(United Kingdom) Elliott Edmondson
2025	15	(Kenya) 2025 Safari Rally	Gravel	(United Kingdom) Gus Greensmith	(Sweden) Jonas Andersson
2025	16	(Italy) 2025 Rally Italia Sardegna	Gravel	(Italy) Roberto Daprà	(Italy) Luca Guglielmetti
2025	17	2025 Rally Estonia	Gravel	(Estonia) Robert Virves	(Estonia) Jakko Viilo
2025	18	(Europe) 2025 Central European Rally	Tarmac	(Czech Republic) Jan Černý	(Czech Republic) Ondřej Krajča
2025	19	2025 Rally Saudi Arabia	Gravel	(United Kingdom) Gus Greensmith	(Sweden) Jonas Andersson
2026	20	(Kenya) 2026 Safari Rally	Gravel	(Estonia) Robert Virves	(Estonia) Jakko Viilo
2026	21	(Greece) 2026 Acropolis Rally	Gravel	(Estonia) Robert Virves	(Estonia) Jakko Viilo
2026	22	2026 Rally Estonia	Gravel	(Estonia) Robert Virves	(Estonia) Jakko Viilo
2026	23	2026 Rally Finland	Gravel	(Estonia) Robert Virves	(Estonia) Jakko Viilo

=== European Rally Championship ===
Year	No.	Event	Surface	Driver	Co-driver
2023	1	2023 Rally Poland	Gravel	(Latvia) Mārtiņš Sesks	(Latvia) Renārs Francis
2023	2	(Latvia) 2023 Rally Liepāja	Gravel	(Latvia) Mārtiņš Sesks	(Latvia) Renārs Francis
2023	3	(Czech Republic) 2023 Barum Czech Rally Zlín	Tarmac	(Czech Republic) Jan Kopecký	(Czech Republic) Jan Hloušek
2024	4	2024 Rally Hungary	Gravel	(Romania) Simone Tempestini	(Romania) Sergiu Itu
2024	5	(Sweden) 2024 Royal Rally of Scandinavia	Gravel	(Sweden) Oliver Solberg	(United Kingdom) Elliott Edmondson
2024	6	(Czech Republic) 2024 Barum Czech Rally Zlín	Tarmac	(Czech Republic) Dominik Stříteský	(Czech Republic) Jiří Hovorka
2024	7	(Poland) 2024 Rally Silesia	Tarmac	(Italy) Andrea Mabellini	(Italy) Virginia Lenzi
2025	8	(Spain) 2025 Rally Sierra Morena	Tarmac	(Bulgaria) Nikolay Gryazin	(Kyrgyzstan) Konstantin Aleksandrov
2025	9	2025 Rally Poland	Gravel	(Latvia) Mārtiņš Sesks	(Latvia) Renārs Francis
2025	10	(Italy) 2025 Rally di Roma Capitale	Tarmac	(Italy) Giandomenico Basso	(Italy) Lorenzo Granai
2025	11	(Czech Republic) 2025 Barum Czech Rally Zlín	Tarmac	(Czech Republic) Jan Kopecký	(Czech Republic) Jiří Hovorka
2026	12	(Spain) 2026 Rally Sierra Morena	Tarmac	(Spain) José António Suárez	(Spain) Alberto Iglesias Pin
2026	13	(Sweden) 2026 Royal Rally of Scandinavia	Gravel	(Finland) Mikko Heikkilä	(Finland) Kristian Temonen
2026	14	(Italy) 2026 Rally di Roma Capitale	Tarmac	(Italy) Roberto Daprà	(Italy) Luca Guglielmetti
2026	15	2026 Rally Poland	Tarmac	(Finland) Teemu Suninen	(Finland) Antti Haapala
2026	16	(Czech Republic) 2026 Barum Czech Rally Zlín	Tarmac	(Czech Republic) Adam Březík	(Czech Republic) Zdeněk Bělák jun.
2026	17	2026 Rally Six Cities North of Portugal	Gravel	(Latvia) Mārtiņš Sesks	(Latvia) Renārs Francis
