= Robert Virves =

Estonian rally driver

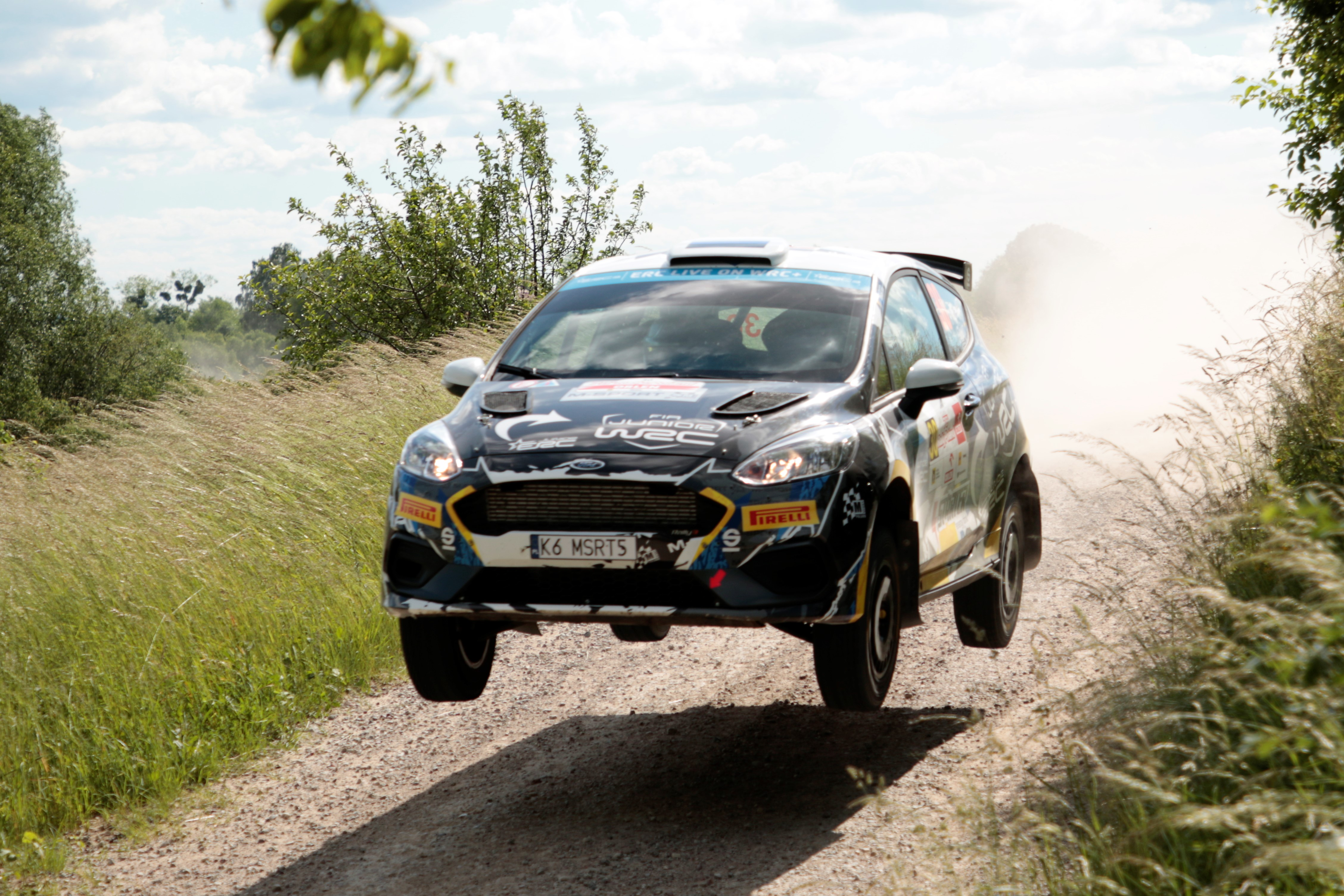

Personal information
- Nationality: (Estonia) Estonian
- Born: 8 July 2000 (age 26); Estonia

World Rally Championship record
- Years active: 2020–present
- Co-driver: (Estonia) Jakko Viilo (Estonia) Aleks Lesk (Estonia) Sander Pruul (Sweden) Julia Thulin (Portugal) Hugo Magalhães (United Kingdom) Craig Drew
- Teams: Toksport WRT
- Rallies: 39
- Championships: 1 ( 2026)
- Rally wins: 8
- Podiums: 17
- Stage wins: 90
- Total points: 246
- First rally: 2020 Rally Estonia
- Last rally: 2026 Rally Italia Sardegna

Robert Virves (born 8 July 2000) is an Estonian rally driver. He won the 2022 Junior World Rally Championship. Virves competes for Toksport WRT in the World Rally Championship. In 2026 he won the WRC2 title, becoming the first Estonian driver to do so.

== Career ==
=== 2022 ===
At the Rally Estonia, Virves set a new record with most stage wins in the Junior WRC class in a single rally event. He won 17 stages, one more than Sébastien Ogier at the 2008 Jordan Rally.

After winning the Acropolis Rally Greece, Virves become the 2022 FIA Junior WRC Champion.

=== 2023 ===
For winning the 2022 JWRC championship he earned six rallies with Ford Fiesta Rally2 car, supported by M-Sport. He also partnered with RedGrey Team to participate in more rallies outside World Rally Championship. His 2023 World Rally Championship season mostly was a failure. Finishing in points only in two rounds out of six with his best result in Estonia, when he finished in sixth place in WRC2 class. He ended the season with two retirements in Finland and Greece and leaving him in 28th place overall in WRC2 class.

=== 2024 ===
Having trouble of finding sponsors, Virves made his first start of the season in Rally Sardegna. He finished both rallies in Sardegna and Poland in 11th place overall, but in Poland, he got his first WRC2 podium finishing in third place. Showing great speed and consistency, he also got to drive in Finland. In Finland, he was holding third place when his bonnet came up during the stage and lost many places. After that, the Estonian rally fans started a campaign to fund Virves driving in Greece. Virves was fighting for the victory in Greece and finished the rally exactly the same time as Sami Pajari. Since Pajari was faster than him in the SS1, Virves was left second. Regardless, he finished the rally in fifth place overall.

=== 2025 ===
In January 2025, it was announced that Virves signed a contract for a full season drive in 2025 WRC with Toksport WRT. He had a terrible start to the season as he had not scored a single point after Portugal. Virves finally scored his seasons first points in Sardegna and Greece, finishing seventh and eighth in WRC2 class. For next round in Estonia in his home event, Virves won the rally in front of Linnamäe and took eight stage wins. It was his first win WRC2. Virves scored another podium in Finland, finishing third. In Rally Paraguay he was holding third place, but he had to change a tire on the penultimate stage which dropped him to fifth place.

=== 2026 ===
Virves extended his contract with Toksport and continued driving with Škoda Fabia RS Rally2 in the WRC. He made his first start of the season at Rally Kenya where he finished fifth overall and winning the rally in WRC2 class, which was his second win in WRC2. He went on to win the WRC2 category at the Acropolis Rally and at his home event, Rally Estonia, recording third win of the season and increasing his career total to four WRC2 wins. On 17 September 2026, the FIA and WRC Promoter withdrew Rally Saudi Arabia from the championship calendar without a replacement, making Rally Italia Sardegna the season finale. As WRC2 drivers count their best six results from seven nominated events, the removal of the round left Teemu Suninen, the only driver still mathematically in contention and 41 points behind, unable to close the gap. Virves and co-driver Jakko Viilo were therefore confirmed as the 2026 WRC2 champions before the final round. He is the first Estonian driver to win the WRC2 title, and the first Škoda driver to do so since Andreas Mikkelsen in 2023.

== Rally victories ==
=== WRC2 victories ===
#	Event	Season	Co-driver	Car
1	2025 Rally Estonia	2025	(Estonia) Jakko Viilo	Škoda Fabia RS Rally2
2	(Kenya) 2026 Safari Rally	2026	(Estonia) Jakko Viilo	Škoda Fabia RS Rally2
3	(Greece) 2026 Acropolis Rally	2026	(Estonia) Jakko Viilo	Škoda Fabia RS Rally2
4	2026 Rally Estonia	2026	(Estonia) Jakko Viilo	Škoda Fabia RS Rally2
5	2026 Rally Finland	2026	(Estonia) Jakko Viilo	Škoda Fabia RS Rally2

=== WRC2 Challenger victories ===
#	Event	Season	Co-driver	Car
1	2025 Rally Estonia	2025	(Estonia) Jakko Viilo	Škoda Fabia RS Rally2
2	(Kenya) 2026 Safari Rally	2026	(Estonia) Jakko Viilo	Škoda Fabia RS Rally2
3	(Greece) 2026 Acropolis Rally	2026	(Estonia) Jakko Viilo	Škoda Fabia RS Rally2
4	2026 Rally Estonia	2026	(Estonia) Jakko Viilo	Škoda Fabia RS Rally2
5	2026 Rally Finland	2026	(Estonia) Jakko Viilo	Škoda Fabia RS Rally2
6	2026 Rally Chile	2026	(Estonia) Jakko Viilo	Škoda Fabia RS Rally2

=== JWRC victories ===
#	Event	Season	Co-driver	Car
1	(Greece) 2022 Acropolis Rally	2022	(Sweden) Julia Thulin	Ford Fiesta Rally3

=== Other notable victories ===
#	Event	Season	Co-driver	Car
1	Rally Estonia Nationals 2024	2024	(United Kingdom) Craig Drew	Škoda Fabia RS Rally2

== Results ==
=== WRC summary ===
Season	Team	Starts	Victories	Podiums	Stage wins	DNF	Points	Final result
2020	Private	1	0	0	0	0	0	NC
2021	Private	5	0	0	0	0	0	NC
2022	Private	5	0	0	0	0	0	NC
2023	M-Sport	6	0	0	0	3	0	NC
2024	Private	4	0	0	0	0	7	19th
2025	Private/Toksport	9	0	0	0	2	0	NC
2026	Toksport	9	0	0	1	0	19	13th
Total		39	0	0	1	5	26	

=== WRC results ===
Year	Entrant	Car	1	2	3	4	5	6	7	8	9	10	11	12	13	14	Pos.	Points
2020	Robert Virves	Ford Fiesta Rally4	MON	SWE	MEX	EST; 30	TUR	ITA	MNZ								NC	0
2021	Autosport Team Estonia	Ford Fiesta Rally4	MON	FIN	CRO; 51	POR; 33	ITA	KEN	EST; 34	BEL; 22	GRE	FIN	ESP; 30	MNZ			NC	0
2022	Starter Energy Racing	Ford Fiesta Rally3	MON	SWE; 34	CRO; 21	POR; 27	ITA	KEN	EST; 17	FIN	BEL	GRE; 19	NZL	ESP	JPN		NC	0
2023	M-Sport Ford WRT	Ford Fiesta Rally2	MON	SWE; 18	MEX	CRO	POR; Ret	ITA; 17	KEN	EST; 14	FIN; Ret	GRE; Ret	CHL	EUR	JPN		NC	0
2024	Robert Virves	Škoda Fabia RS Rally2	MON	SWE	KEN	CRO	POR	ITA; 11	POL; 11	LAT	FIN; 14	GRE; 5	CHI	EUR	JPN		19th	7
2025	Robert Virves	Škoda Fabia RS Rally2	MON	SWE; 32	KEN	ESP; Ret											NC	0
2025	Toksport WRT	Škoda Fabia RS Rally2					POR; Ret	ITA; 15	GRE; 14	EST; 11	FIN; 13	PAR; 11	CHL	EUR	JPN	SAU; 14	NC	0
2026	Toksport WRT	Škoda Fabia RS Rally2	MON	SWE	KEN; 5	CRO	ESP; 24	POR; 32	JPN	GRE; 9	EST; 10	FIN; 9	PAR; 36	CHL; 9	ITA; 9		13th	19

* Season still in progress.

=== WRC-2 results ===
Year	Entrant	Car	1	2	3	4	5	6	7	8	9	10	11	12	13	14	Pos.	Points
2023	M-Sport Ford WRT	Ford Fiesta Rally2	MON	SWE; 9	MEX	CRO	POR; Ret	ITA; 12	KEN	EST; 6	FIN; Ret	GRE; Ret	CHL	EUR	JPN		27th	10
2024	Robert Virves	Škoda Fabia RS Rally2	MON	SWE	KEN	CRO	POR	ITA; 6	POL; 3	LAT	FIN; 8	GRE; 2	CHI	EUR	JPN		10th	45
2025	Toksport WRT	Škoda Fabia RS Rally2	MON	SWE	KEN	ESP	POR; Ret	ITA; 7	GRE; 8	EST; 1	FIN; 3	PAR; 5	CHL	EUR	JPN	SAU; 3	5th	75
2026	Toksport WRT	Škoda Fabia RS Rally2	MON	SWE	KEN; 1	CRO	ESP	POR	JPN	GRE; 1	EST; 1	FIN; 1	PAR; 18	CHL; 2	ITA; 2		1st	117

* Season still in progress.

=== WRC-2 Challenger ===
Year	Entrant	Car	1	2	3	4	5	6	7	8	9	10	11	12	13	14	Pos.	Points
2023	M-Sport Ford WRT	Ford Fiesta Rally2	MON	SWE; 5	MEX	CRO	POR; Ret	ITA; 9	KEN	EST; 4	FIN; Ret	GRE; Ret	CHL	EUR	JPN		15th	24
2024	Robert Virves	Škoda Fabia RS Rally2	MON	SWE	KEN	CRO	POR	ITA; 5	POL; 2	LAT	FIN; 6	GRE; 2	CHI	EUR	JPN		8th	54
2025	Toksport WRT	Škoda Fabia RS Rally2	MON	SWE	KEN	ESP	POR; Ret	ITA; 7	GRE; 4	EST; 1	FIN; 2	PAR; 3	CHL	EUR	JPN	SAU; 2	3rd	92
2026	Toksport WRT	Škoda Fabia RS Rally2	MON	SWE	KEN; 1	CRO	ESP	POR	JPN	GRE; 1	EST; 1	FIN; 1	PAR; 16	CHL; 1	ITA; 2		1st	125

=== ERC results ===
Year	Entrant	Car	1	2	3	4	5	6	7	8	Pos.	Points
2022	M-Sport Poland	Ford Fiesta Rally3	PRT1	PRT2	ESP1	POL; 13	LAT	ITA; 15	CZE	ESP2	50th	4
2023	RedGrey Team	Ford Fiesta Rally2	PRT; 16	CAN	POL	LAT; 5	SWE	ITA	CZE	HUN	26th	19
2024	Robert Virves	Škoda Fabia RS Rally2	HUN	CAN	SWE	EST; 2	ITA	CZE	GBR	POL	18th	28
2025	Robert Virves	Škoda Fabia RS Rally2	ESP; Ret	HUN	SWE	POL	ITA	CZE	GBR	CRO; 5	26th	18

=== JWRC results/WRC-3 Junior ===
Year	Entrant	Car	1	2	3	4	5	WDC	Points
2020	Robert Virves	Ford Fiesta Rally4	SWE	EST; 3	ITA	MNZ		9th	17
2021	Autosport Team Estonia	Ford Fiesta Rally4	CRO; 7	POR; 3	EST; 7	BEL; 3	ESP; 3	5th	78
2022	Starter Energy Racing	Ford Fiesta Rally3	SWE; 6	CRO; 2	POR; 3	EST; 2	GRE; 1	1st	130

Sporting positions
Preceded by Sami Pajari	Junoir WRC Champion; 2022	Succeeded by William Creighton
Preceded by Oliver Solberg	WRC2 Champion; 2026	Succeeded by TBD
