= Taylor Gill =

Australian rally driver

- Nationality: (Australia) Australian
- Born: 30 October 2003 (age 23) Lake Macquarie, New South Wales, Australia

World Rally Championship
- Years active: 2024–
- Co-driver: Daniel Brkic
- Former teams: FIA Rally Star
- Starts: 15

Previous series
- Junior World Rally Championship; Australian Rally Championship

Awards
- 2025 2022: Sir Jack Brabham Award; Motorsport Australia Young Driver of the Year

Taylor Gill (born 30 October 2003) is an Australian rally driver.

Gill drove for the FIA Rally Star team in the FIA Junior WRC after being selected as the winner of the Asia-Pacific section of the worldwide talent search program in 2022.

== Career ==
=== FIA Rally Star and Junior WRC/WRC3 (2022–2025) ===
Gill won the Asia-Pacific division of the Worldwide talent search in October 2022, in the same year he also won the Australian Rally Championship in the Production Cup category. As one of six drivers selected from around the world, he competed in six events of the FIA Rally Star Training Season in 2023, driving a Ford Fiesta Rally3, prepared by M-Sport Poland. He progressed to the 2024 Junior WRC Championship to make his rally debut alongside three other drivers in the programme.

Gill's debut season included a podium at the Croatian Rally and a win at Rally Finland, he ended the season in fourth. Gill was selected to continue in the final season of the FIA Rally Star programme in 2025. He came runner-up to both the Junior WRC Championship, and the WRC3 Championship and stepped up to the 2026 WRC2 Championship the following year.

== Personal life ==
Gill is based in Vääksy, Finland.

== Results ==
=== JWRC results ===
Year	Entrant	Car	1	2	3	4	5	WDC	Points
2024	FIA Rally Star	Ford Fiesta Rally3	SWE; 8	CRO; 2^{3}	ITA; 6^{1}	FIN; 1^{2}	GRE; 8	4th	69
2025	FIA Rally Star	Ford Fiesta Rally3	SWE; 1^{2}	POR; 1^{7}	GRE; 2^{2}	FIN; 2^{5}	EUR; 2^{5}	2nd	140
