= FIA Rally Star =

Rally driver detection and development program by FIA

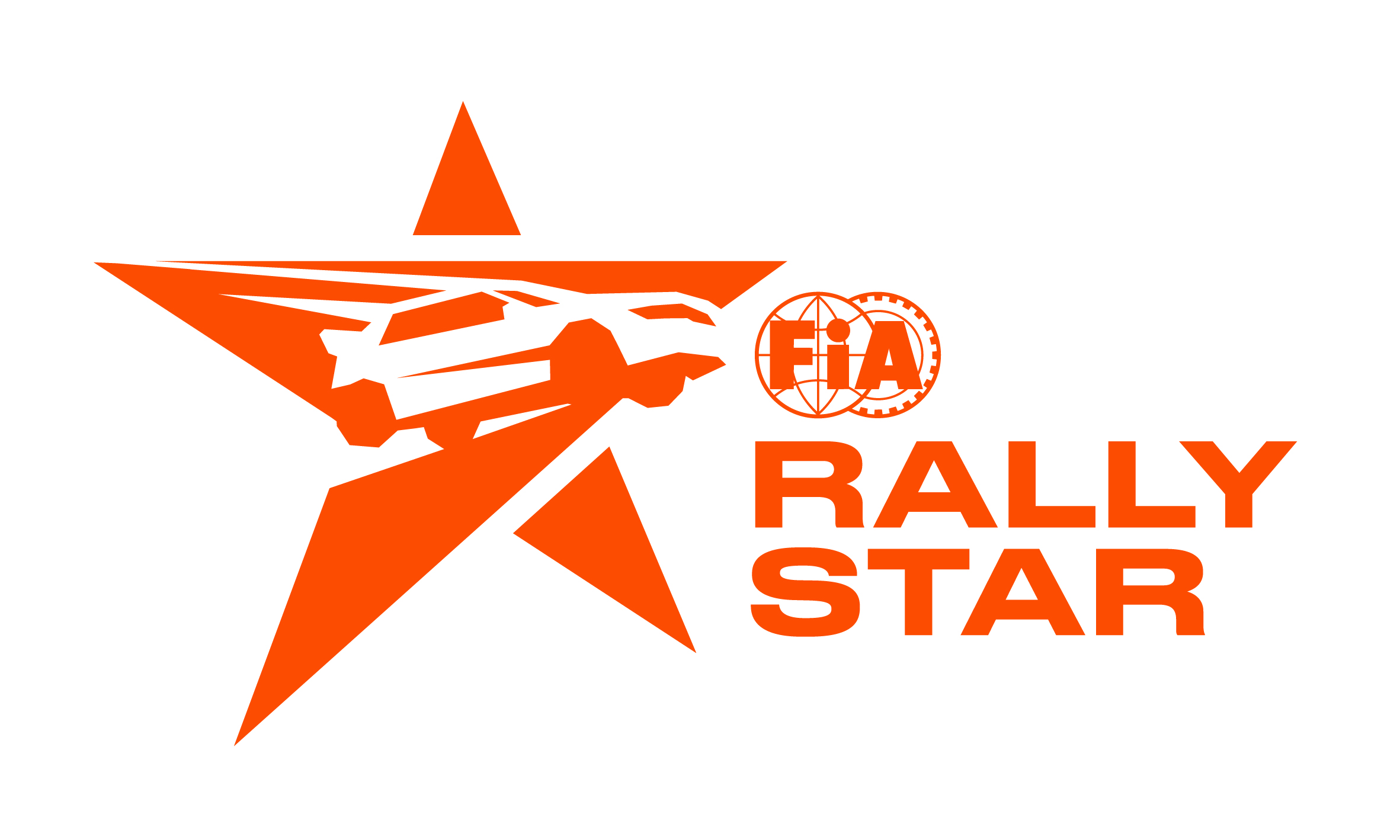
- Category: Rally
- Region: Worldwide
- Inaugural season: 2021
- Drivers: 6400
- Official website: www.fia.com/fia-rally-star

FIA Rally Star is the first global talent detection program, initiated to support young rally drivers, organised by the Fédération Internationale de l'Automobile (FIA).

== History ==
FIA Rally Star talent search initiative used the WRC9 video game, along with Gymkhana events to identify prospects for its new Rally Star program. The driver selection process was conducted with national motorsport associations in each individual FIA region. Following national selection events, Continental Finals were organised using Autocross cars to select the best talent of each region. The six drivers then competed in six events of the FIA Rally Star Training Season in 2023, driving in identical Ford Fiesta Rally3, prepared by M-Sport Poland. Four drivers were chosen from these six drivers and who competed in the 2024 JWRC. In 2024, Romet Jürgenson won the Junior WRC title in his debut season.

== Drivers ==
Year	Drivers	Representing
2023	(Estonia) Romet Jürgenson	Europe
2023	(Oman) Abdullah Al Tawqi	Asia
2023	(South Africa) Max Smart	Africa
2023	(Australia) Taylor Gill	Oceania
2023	(Peru) Jose Caparó	South America
2023	(Peru) Annia Cilloniz	Women's Final

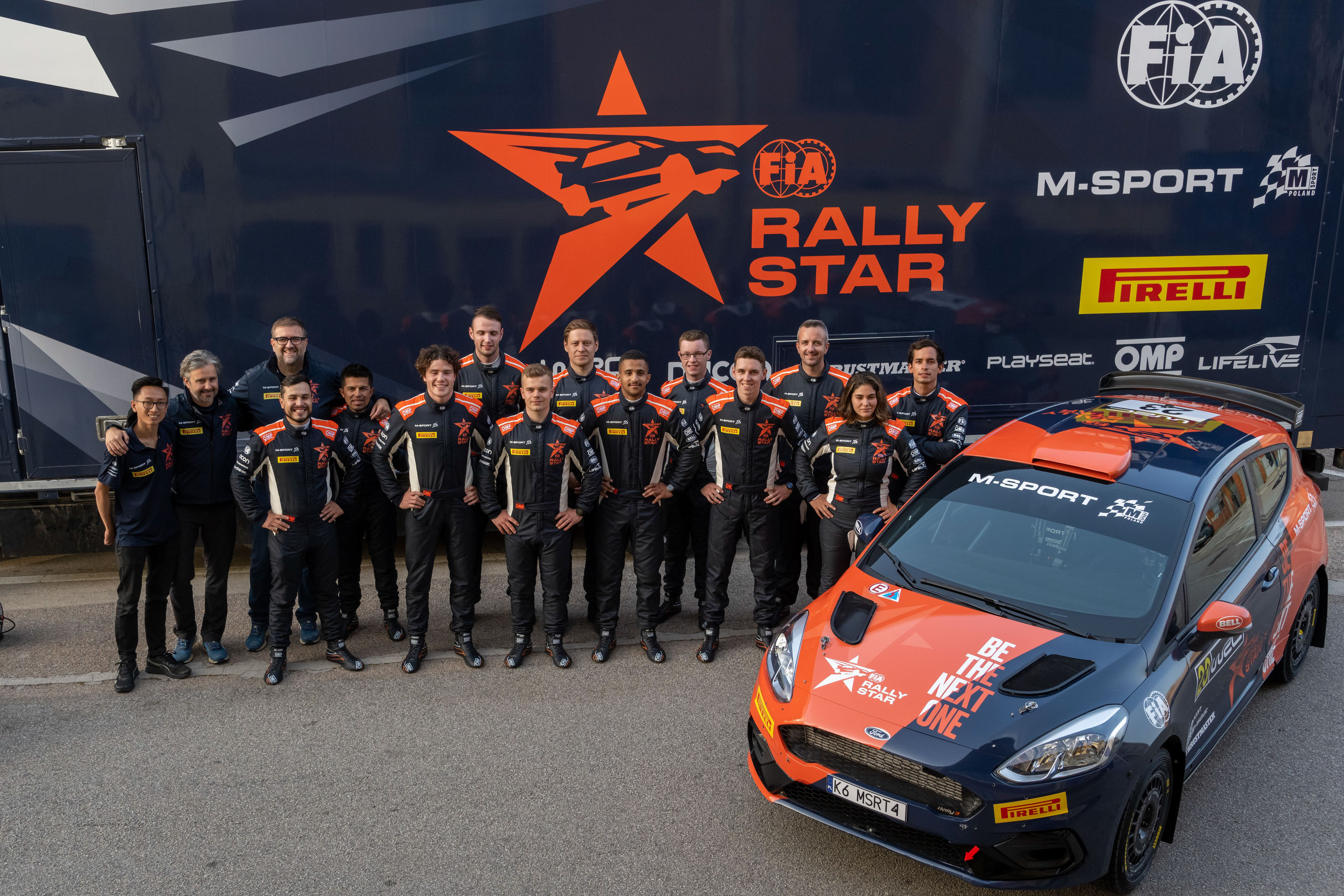
FIA Rally Star team at the training camp in Sardinia 2023

== WRC results ==
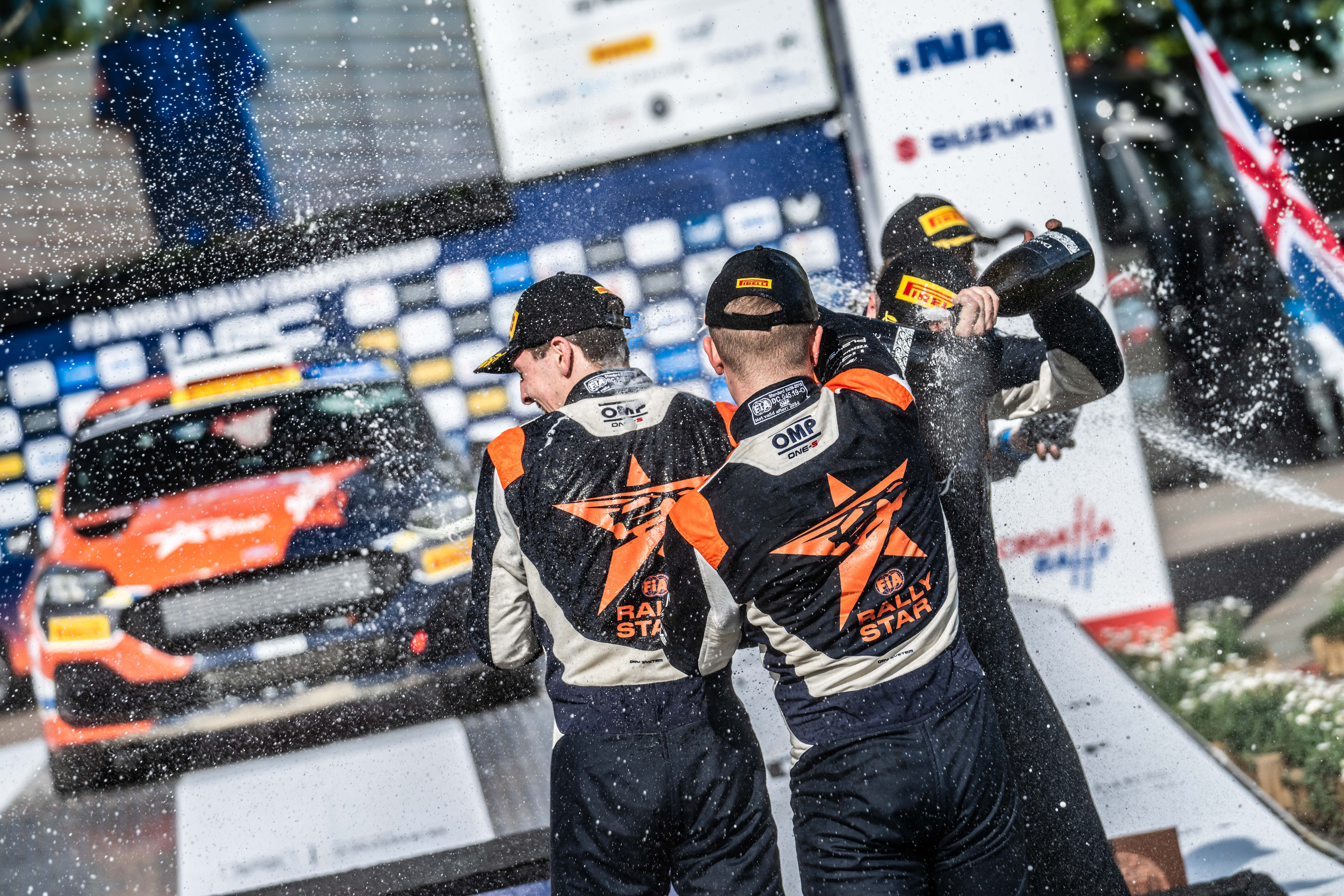
Romet Jürgenson and Taylor Gill celebrating a one-two finish at WRC Croatia Rally 2024

=== WRC2 results ===
Year	Driver	Car	1	2	3	4	5	6	7	8	9	10	11	12	13	14	Pos.	Points
2025	(Estonia) Romet Jürgenson	Ford Fiesta Rally2	MON	SWE; 7	KEN	ESP; 27	POR; 11	ITA; 5	GRE	EST; 5	FIN; 6	PAR	CHL	EUR	JPN	SAU	13th	34

=== JWRC results ===
Year	Driver	Car	1	2	3	4	5	Pos.	Points
2024	(Estonia) Romet Jürgenson	Ford Fiesta Rally3	SWE; 2	CRO; 1	ITA; 14	FIN; 12	GRE; 2	1st	108
2024	(Australia) Taylor Gill	Ford Fiesta Rally3	SWE; 8	CRO; 2	ITA; 6	FIN; 1	GRE; 8	4th	65
2024	(South Africa) Max Smart	Ford Fiesta Rally3	SWE; 10	CRO; 7	ITA; 3	FIN; 11	GRE; 7	7th	34
2024	(Peru) Jose Caparó	Ford Fiesta Rally3	SWE; Ret	CRO; 6	ITA; 15	FIN; 9	GRE; 4	8th	34
2025
2025	(Australia) Taylor Gill	Ford Fiesta Rally3	SWE; 1	POR; 1	GRE; 2	FIN; 2	EUR; 2	2nd	123

== See also ==
- Pirelli Star Driver
- Drive DMACK Fiesta Trophy
- FIA
