= 2025 Rally Sweden =

72nd edition of the Rally Sweden

2025 Rally Sweden Swedish Rally 2025
Round 2 of 14 in the 2025 World Rally Championship
| ← Previous event | Next event → |
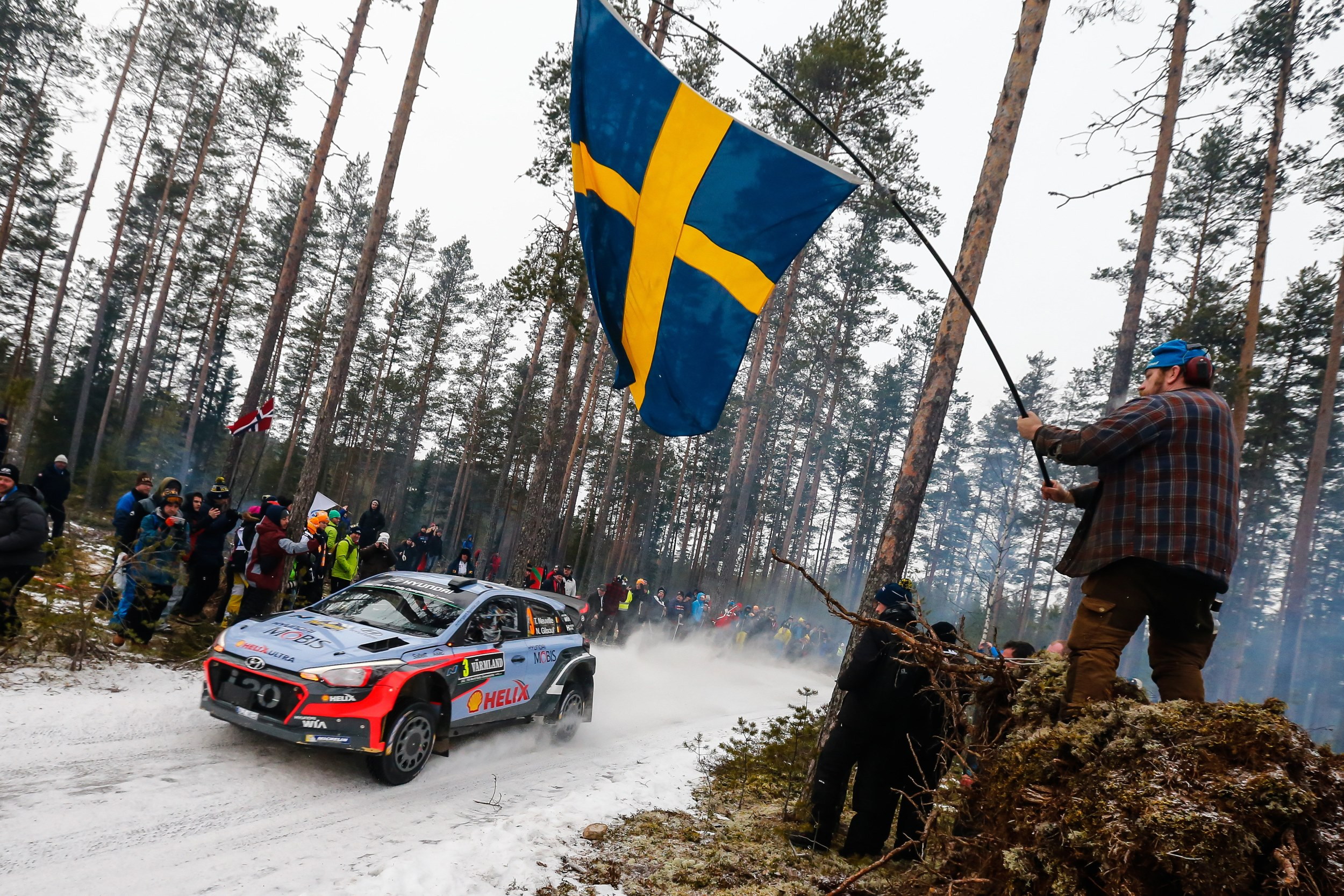
- Rally Sweden is the only snow event on the World Rally Championship calendar.
- Host country: Sweden
- Rally base: Umeå, Västerbotten County
- Dates run: 13 – 16 February 2025
- Start location: Umeå, Västerbotten County
- Finish location: Umeå, Västerbotten County
- Stages: 18 (300.22 km; 186.55 miles)
- Stage surface: Snow
- Transport distance: 759.83 km (472.14 miles)
- Overall distance: 1,060.05 km (658.68 miles)

Statistics
- Crews registered: 62
- Crews: 60 at start, 56 at finish

Overall results
- Overall winner: (United Kingdom) Elfyn Evans (United Kingdom) Scott Martin (Japan) Toyota Gazoo Racing WRT; 2:33:39.2
- Sunday Accumulated leader: (United Kingdom) Elfyn Evans (United Kingdom) Scott Martin (Japan) Toyota Gazoo Racing WRT; 33:35.0
- Power Stage winner: (United Kingdom) Elfyn Evans (United Kingdom) Scott Martin (Japan) Toyota Gazoo Racing WRT; 4:58.9

Support category results
- WRC-2 winner: (Sweden) Oliver Solberg (United Kingdom) Elliott Edmondson (Finland) Printsport; 2:42:02.3
- WRC-3 winner: (Australia) Taylor Gill (Australia) Daniel Brkic; FIA Rally Star; 2:51:17.7
- J-WRC winner: (Australia) Taylor Gill (Australia) Daniel Brkic; FIA Rally Star; 2:51:17.7

The 2025 Rally Sweden (also known as the 2025 Swedish Rally) was a motor racing event for rally cars held over four days from 13 to 16 February 2025. It marked the seventy-second running of the Rally Sweden, and was the second round of the 2025 World Rally Championship, 2025 WRC2 Championship and 2025 WRC3 Championship. The event was also the first round of the 2025 Junior WRC Championship. The 2025 event was based in Umeå in Västerbotten County and was consisted of eighteen special stages, covering a total competitive distance of 300.22 km (186.55 mi).

Esapekka Lappi and Janne Ferm were the defending rally winners, and Hyundai Shell Mobis WRT, were the defending manufacturer's winners. Oliver Solberg and Elliott Edmondson were the defending rally winners in the WRC2 championship. Mille Johansson and Johan Grönvall were the defending rally winners in the WRC3 championship as well as the junior championship.

Elfyn Evans and Scott Martin won the rally, and their team, Toyota Gazoo Racing WRT were the manufacturer's winners. Oliver Solberg and Elliott Edmondson successfully defended their titles in the WRC2 category. Taylor Gill and Daniel Brkic were the winners in the WRC3 category, as well as the junior class.

== Background ==
=== Entry list ===
The following crews entered into the rally. The event was opened to crews competing in the World Rally Championship, its support categories, the WRC2 Championship, the WRC3 Championship and privateer entries that were not registered to score points in any championship. Twelve entered under Rally1 regulations, as were twenty Rally2 crews in the WRC2 Championship and nineteen Rally3 crew in the WRC3 Championship. A total of twelve crews participated in the Junior World Rally Championship.

Rally1 entries competing in the World Rally Championship
| No. | Driver | Co-Driver | Entrant | Car | Championship eligibility | Tyre |
|---|---|---|---|---|---|---|
| 1 | (Belgium) Thierry Neuville | (Belgium) Martijn Wydaeghe | (South Korea) Hyundai Shell Mobis WRT | Hyundai i20 N Rally1 | Driver, Co-driver, Manufacturer | H |
| 5 | (Finland) Sami Pajari | (Finland) Marko Salminen | (Japan) Toyota Gazoo Racing WRT2 | Toyota GR Yaris Rally1 | Driver, Co-driver, Manufacturer | H |
| 8 | (Estonia) Ott Tänak | (Estonia) Martin Järveoja | (South Korea) Hyundai Shell Mobis WRT | Hyundai i20 N Rally1 | Driver, Co-driver, Manufacturer | H |
| 9 | (Greece) Jourdan Serderidis | (Belgium) Frédéric Miclotte | (United Kingdom) M-Sport Ford WRT | Ford Puma Rally1 | Driver, Co-driver | H |
| 13 | (Luxembourg) Grégoire Munster | (Belgium) Louis Louka | (United Kingdom) M-Sport Ford WRT | Ford Puma Rally1 | Driver, Co-driver, Manufacturer | H |
| 16 | (France) Adrien Fourmaux | (France) Alexandre Coria | (South Korea) Hyundai Shell Mobis WRT | Hyundai i20 N Rally1 | Driver, Co-driver, Manufacturer | H |
| 18 | (Japan) Takamoto Katsuta | (Republic of Ireland) Aaron Johnston | (Japan) Toyota Gazoo Racing WRT | Toyota GR Yaris Rally1 | Driver, Co-driver, Manufacturer | H |
| 22 | (Latvia) Mārtiņš Sesks | (Latvia) Renārs Francis | (United Kingdom) M-Sport Ford WRT | Ford Puma Rally1 | Driver, Co-driver | H |
| 33 | (United Kingdom) Elfyn Evans | (United Kingdom) Scott Martin | (Japan) Toyota Gazoo Racing WRT | Toyota GR Yaris Rally1 | Driver, Co-driver, Manufacturer | H |
| ~~37~~ | (Italy) ~~Lorenzo Bertelli~~ | (Italy) ~~Simone Scattolin~~ | (Japan) ~~Toyota Gazoo Racing WRT~~ | ~~Toyota GR Yaris Rally1~~ | ~~Driver, Co-driver~~ | —N/a |
| 55 | (Republic of Ireland) Josh McErlean | (Republic of Ireland) Eoin Treacy | (United Kingdom) M-Sport Ford WRT | Ford Puma Rally1 | Driver, Co-driver, Manufacturer | H |
| 69 | (Finland) Kalle Rovanperä | (Finland) Jonne Halttunen | (Japan) Toyota Gazoo Racing WRT | Toyota GR Yaris Rally1 | Driver, Co-driver, Manufacturer | H |

Rally2 entries competing in the WRC2 Championship
| No. | Driver | Co-Driver | Entrant | Car | Championship eligibility | Tyre |
|---|---|---|---|---|---|---|
| 20 | (Sweden) Oliver Solberg | (United Kingdom) Elliott Edmondson | (Finland) Printsport | Toyota GR Yaris Rally2 | Driver, Co-driver | H |
| 21 | (Estonia) Georg Linnamäe | (United Kingdom) James Morgan | (Estonia) Georg Linnamäe | Toyota GR Yaris Rally2 | Challenger Driver, Challenger Co-driver | H |
| 23 | (Finland) Roope Korhonen | (Finland) Anssi Viinikka | (Finland) Roope Korhonen | Toyota GR Yaris Rally2 | Challenger Driver, Challenger Co-driver | H |
| 24 | (Sweden) Pontus Tidemand | (Norway) Jørgen Eriksen | (Sweden) Pontus Tidemand | Škoda Fabia RS Rally2 | Driver, Co-driver | H |
| 25 | (Finland) Mikko Heikkilä | (Finland) Kristian Temonen | (Finland) Mikko Heikkilä | Škoda Fabia RS Rally2 | Challenger Driver, Challenger Co-driver | H |
| 26 | (Finland) Lauri Joona | (Finland) Samu Vaaleri | (Finland) Lauri Joona | Škoda Fabia RS Rally2 | Challenger Driver, Challenger Co-driver | H |
| 27 | (Paraguay) Fabrizio Zaldivar | (Italy) Marcelo Der Ohannesian | (Germany) Toksport WRT | Škoda Fabia RS Rally2 | Challenger Driver, Challenger Co-driver | H |
| 29 | (Sweden) Isak Reiersen | (Sweden) Stefan Gustavsson | (Sweden) Isak Reiersen | Škoda Fabia RS Rally2 | Challenger Driver, Challenger Co-driver | H |
| 30 | (Estonia) Romet Jürgenson | (Estonia) Siim Oja | FIA Rally Star | Ford Fiesta Rally2 | Challenger Driver, Challenger Co-driver | H |
| 31 | (Japan) Hikaru Kogure | (Finland) Topi Matias Luhtinen | (Japan) Toyota Gazoo Racing WRT NG | Toyota GR Yaris Rally2 | Challenger Driver, Challenger Co-driver, Team | H |
| 32 | (Japan) Yuki Yamamoto | (Republic of Ireland) James Fulton | (Japan) Toyota Gazoo Racing WRT NG | Toyota GR Yaris Rally2 | Challenger Driver, Challenger Co-driver, Team | H |
| 34 | (Finland) Tuukka Kauppinen | (Finland) Sebastian Virtanen | (Finland) Tuukka Kauppinen | Toyota GR Yaris Rally2 | Challenger Driver, Challenger Co-driver | H |
| 35 | (Poland) Michał Sołowow | (Poland) Maciej Baran | (Finland) Printsport | Toyota GR Yaris Rally2 | Challenger/Masters Driver, Challenger/Masters Co-driver | H |
| 36 | (Czech Republic) Filip Kohn | (United Kingdom) Ross Whittock | (Czech Republic) Filip Kohn | Škoda Fabia RS Rally2 | Challenger Driver, Challenger Co-driver | H |
| 38 | (Netherlands) Bernhard ten Brinke | (United Kingdom) Tom Woodburn | (Netherlands) Bernhard ten Brinke | Škoda Fabia RS Rally2 | Challenger Driver, Challenger Co-driver | H |
| 39 | (Poland) Jarosław Kołtun | (Poland) Ireneusz Pleskot | (Poland) Jarosław Kołtun | Škoda Fabia RS Rally2 | Challenger Driver, Challenger Co-driver | H |
| 40 | (Mexico) Alejandro Mauro | (Spain) Adrián Pérez | (Mexico) Alejandro Mauro | Škoda Fabia RS Rally2 | Challenger Driver, Challenger Co-driver | H |
| 41 | (Turkey) Uğur Soylu | (Turkey) Sener Güray | (Turkey) GP Garage My Team | Škoda Fabia RS Rally2 | Challenger/Masters Driver, Challenger Co-driver | H |
| 42 | (Mexico) Miguel Granados | (Spain) Marc Martí | (Mexico) Miguel Granados | Škoda Fabia RS Rally2 | Challenger/Masters Driver, Challenger/Masters Co-driver | H |
| 43 | (Italy) Rachele Somaschini | (Italy) Nicola Arena | (Italy) Rachele Somaschini | Citroën C3 Rally2 | Challenger Driver, Challenger Co-driver | H |

Rally3 entries competing in the WRC3 Championship and/or the Junior World Rally Championship
| No. | Driver | Co-Driver | Entrant | Car | Class/Championship eligibility | Tyre |
|---|---|---|---|---|---|---|
| 44 | (France) Mattéo Chatillon | (France) Maxence Cornuau | (France) Mattéo Chatillon | Renault Clio Rally3 | WRC3 | H |
| 45 | (Italy) Matteo Fontana | (Italy) Alessandro Arnaboldi | (Italy) Matteo Fontana | Ford Fiesta Rally3 | WRC3 | H |
| 46 | (Finland) Ville Vatanen | (Finland) Jarno Ottman | (Finland) Ville Vatanen | Renault Clio Rally3 | WRC3 | H |
| 47 | (Japan) Takumi Matsushita | (Finland) Pekka Kelander | (Japan) Toyota Gazoo Racing WRT NG | Renault Clio Rally3 | WRC3 | H |
| 48 | (Japan) Shotaro Goto | (Finland) Jussi Lindberg | (Japan) Toyota Gazoo Racing WRT NG | Renault Clio Rally3 | WRC3 | H |
| 49 | (Finland) Leevi Lassila | (Finland) Antti Linnaketo | (Finland) Leevi Lassila | Renault Clio Rally3 | WRC3 | H |
| 50 | (Sweden) Adam Grahn | (Sweden) Maja Bengtsson | (Sweden) Adam Grahn | Ford Fiesta Rally3 | WRC3 | H |
| 51 | (Greece) Georgios Vasilakis | (United Kingdom) Allan Harryman | (Greece) Georgios Vasilakis | Ford Fiesta Rally3 | WRC3, Masters Driver, Masters Co-Driver | H |
| 52 | (France) Eric Royère | (France) Alexis Grenier | (France) Eric Royère | Renault Clio Rally3 | WRC3 | H |
| 53 | (Peru) André Martinez | (Argentina) Matias Aranguren | (Peru) André Martinez | Ford Fiesta Rally3 | WRC3 | H |
| 54 | (Turkey) Ali Türkkan | (Turkey) Oytun Albaykar | (Turkey) Castrol Ford Team Türkiye | Ford Fiesta Rally3 | WRC3, Junior WRC | H |
| 56 | (Australia) Taylor Gill | (Australia) Daniel Brkic | FIA Rally Star | Ford Fiesta Rally3 | WRC3, Junior WRC | H |
| 57 | (Paraguay) Diego Dominguez Jr. | (Spain) Rogelio Peñate | (Paraguay) Diego Dominguez Jr. | Ford Fiesta Rally3 | WRC3, Junior WRC | H |
| 58 | (Sweden) Mille Johansson | (Sweden) Johan Grönvall | (Sweden) Mille Johansson | Ford Fiesta Rally3 | Junior WRC | H |
| 59 | (South Africa) Max Smart | (United Kingdom) Cameron Fair | FIA Rally Star | Ford Fiesta Rally3 | WRC3, Junior WRC | H |
| 60 | (Republic of Ireland) Eamonn Kelly | (Republic of Ireland) Conor Mohan | (Republic of Ireland) Motorsport Ireland Rally Academy | Ford Fiesta Rally3 | Junior WRC | H |
| 61 | (France) Tristan Charpentier | (France) Florian Barral | (France) Tristan Charpentier | Ford Fiesta Rally3 | WRC3, Junior WRC | H |
| 62 | (Estonia) Joosep Ralf Nõgene | (Estonia) Aleks Lesk | (Estonia) LightGrey | Ford Fiesta Rally3 | WRC3, Junior WRC | H |
| 63 | (Belgium) Thomas Martens | (United Kingdom) Max Freeman | (Belgium) Thomas Martens | Ford Fiesta Rally3 | Junior WRC | H |
| 64 | (Turkey) Kerem Kazaz | (France) Corentin Silvestre | (Turkey) Team Petrol Ofisi | Ford Fiesta Rally3 | WRC3, Junior WRC | H |
| 65 | (Germany) Claire Schönborn | (Germany) Jara Hain | WRC Young Driver Program | Ford Fiesta Rally3 | WRC3, Junior WRC | H |
| 66 | (Belgium) Lyssia Baudet | (France) Léa Sam-Caw-Freve | WRC Young Driver Program | Ford Fiesta Rally3 | WRC3, Junior WRC | H |

Other major entries
| No. | Driver | Co-Driver | Entrant | Car | Championship eligibility | Tyre |
|---|---|---|---|---|---|---|
| 28 | (Estonia) Robert Virves | (Estonia) Jakko Viilo | (Estonia) Robert Virves | Škoda Fabia RS Rally2 | —N/a | H |
| 68 | (Spain) Alexander Villanueva | (Spain) Alberto Chamorro | (Spain) Alexander Villanueva | Škoda Fabia RS Rally2 | Masters Driver | H |
| 70 | (Peru) Jorge Martínez | (Chile) José Alberto Aros | (Peru) Jorge Martínez | Hyundai i20 N Rally2 | Masters Driver | H |

=== Itinerary ===
All dates and times are CET (UTC+1).

| Date | No. | Time span | Stage name | Distance |
|---|---|---|---|---|
| 13 February | —N/a | After 9:01 | Umeå City [Shakedown] | 3.44 km |
| 13 February | | After 18:40 | Opening ceremony, Red Barn Arena | —N/a |
| 13 February | SS1 | After 19:05 | Umeå Sprint 1 | 5.16 km |
| 14 February | SS2 | After 9:18 | Bygdsiljum 1 | 28.27 km |
| 14 February | SS3 | After 10:19 | Andersvattnet 1 | 20.51 km |
| 14 February | SS4 | After 11:27 | Bäck 1 | 10.80 km |
| 14 February | | 12:35 – 12:55 | Regroup, Red Barn | —N/a |
| 14 February | | 12:55 – 13:35 | Service A, Umeå | —N/a |
| 14 February | SS5 | After 14:48 | Bygdsiljum 2 | 28.27 km |
| 14 February | SS6 | After 15:49 | Andersvattnet 2 | 20.51 km |
| 14 February | SS7 | After 16:57 | Bäck 2 | 10.80 km |
| 14 February | | 18:00 – 18:40 | Regroup, Red Barn | —N/a |
| 14 February | SS8 | After 19:05 | Umeå Sprint 2 | 5.16 km |
| 14 February | | 19:45 – 20:30 | Flexi service B, Umeå | —N/a |
| 15 February | SS9 | After 9:10 | Vännäs 1 | 15.65 km |
| 15 February | SS10 | After 10:05 | Sarsjöliden 1 | 14.23 km |
| 15 February | SS11 | After 11:08 | Kolksele 1 | 16.06 km |
| 15 February | | 12:07 – 12:45 | Regroup, Red Barn | —N/a |
| 15 February | | 12:45 – 13:25 | Service C, Umeå | —N/a |
| 15 February | SS12 | After 14:10 | Vännäs 2 | 15.65 km |
| 15 February | SS13 | After 15:05 | Sarsjöliden 2 | 14.23 km |
| 15 February | SS14 | After 16:08 | Kolksele 2 | 16.06 km |
| 15 February | | 18:15 – 18:40 | Regroup, Red Barn | —N/a |
| 15 February | SS15 | After 18:05 | Umeå Sprint 3 | 5.16 km |
| 15 February | | 18:52 – 19:37 | Flexi service D, Umeå | —N/a |
| 16 February | SS16 | After 7:27 | Västervik 1 | 29.35 km |
| 16 February | | 8:45 – 9:00 | Regroup, Umeå | —N/a |
| 16 February | | 9:00 – 9:15 | Service E, Umeå | —N/a |
| 16 February | SS17 | After 9:57 | Västervik 2 | 29.35 km |
| 16 February | | 11:15 – 11:55 | Regroup, Red Barn | —N/a |
| 16 February | SS18 | After 12:15 | Umeå [Power Stage] | 8.62 km |
| 16 February | | After 12:45 | Finish, Umeå | —N/a |
| 16 February | | After 13:30 | Podium ceremony, Red Barn Arena | —N/a |

== Report ==
=== WRC Rally1 ===
==== Classification ====
| Position | | No. | Driver | Co-driver | Entrant | Car | Time | Difference | Points | | | |
| Event | Class | No. | Driver | Co-driver | Entrant | Car | Time | Difference | Event | Sunday | Stage | Total |
|---|---|---|---|---|---|---|---|---|---|---|---|---|
| 1 | 1 | 33 | Elfyn Evans | Scott Martin | Toyota Gazoo Racing WRT | Toyota GR Yaris Rally1 | 2:33:39.2 | 0.0 | 25 | 5 | 5 | 35 |
| 2 | 2 | 18 | Takamoto Katsuta | Aaron Johnston | Toyota Gazoo Racing WRT | Toyota GR Yaris Rally1 | 2:33:43.0 | +3.8 | 17 | 4 | 4 | 25 |
| 3 | 3 | 1 | Thierry Neuville | Martijn Wydaeghe | Hyundai Shell Mobis WRT | Hyundai i20 N Rally1 | 2:33:51.1 | +11.9 | 15 | 2 | 3 | 20 |
| 4 | 4 | 8 | Ott Tänak | Martin Järveoja | Hyundai Shell Mobis WRT | Hyundai i20 N Rally1 | 2:33:56.0 | +16.8 | 12 | 3 | 0 | 15 |
| 5 | 5 | 69 | Kalle Rovanperä | Jonne Halttunen | Toyota Gazoo Racing WRT | Toyota GR Yaris Rally1 | 2:34:12.0 | +32.8 | 10 | 1 | 2 | 13 |
| 6 | 6 | 22 | Mārtiņš Sesks | Renārs Francis | M-Sport Ford WRT | Ford Puma Rally1 | 2:35:48.6 | +2:09.4 | 8 | 0 | 0 | 8 |
| 7 | 7 | 5 | Sami Pajari | Marko Salminen | Toyota Gazoo Racing WRT2 | Toyota GR Yaris Rally1 | 2:36:06.2 | +2:27.0 | 6 | 0 | 0 | 6 |
| 8 | 8 | 13 | Grégoire Munster | Louis Louka | M-Sport Ford WRT | Ford Puma Rally1 | 2:37:47.8 | +4:08.6 | 4 | 0 | 0 | 4 |
| 33 | 9 | 9 | Jourdan Serderidis | Frédéric Miclotte | M-Sport Ford WRT | Ford Puma Rally1 | 3:00:16.4 | +26:37.2 | 0 | 0 | 0 | 0 |
| 40 | 10 | 16 | Adrien Fourmaux | Alexandre Coria | Hyundai Shell Mobis WRT | Hyundai i20 N Rally1 | 3:06:44.8 | +33:05.6 | 0 | 0 | 1 | 1 |
| 46 | 11 | 55 | Josh McErlean | Eoin Treacy | M-Sport Ford WRT | Ford Puma Rally1 | 3:29:11.1 | +55:31.9 | 0 | 0 | 0 | 0 |

==== Special stages ====
| Stage | Winners | Car | Time | Class leaders |
|---|---|---|---|---|
| SD | Neuville / Wydaeghe | Hyundai i20 N Rally1 | 2:06.5 | —N/a |
| SS1 | Evans / Martin | Toyota GR Yaris Rally1 | 3:21.6 | Evans / Martin |
| SS2 | Evans / Martin | Toyota GR Yaris Rally1 | 13:58.8 | Evans / Martin |
| SS3 | Fourmaux / Coria | Hyundai i20 N Rally1 | 10:43.8 | Evans / Martin |
| SS4 | Fourmaux / Coria | Hyundai i20 N Rally1 | 5:54.6 | Evans / Martin |
| SS5 | Katsuta / Johnston | Toyota GR Yaris Rally1 | 13:50.1 | Katsuta / Johnston |
| SS6 | Tänak / Järveoja | Hyundai i20 N Rally1 | 10:49.2 | Evans / Martin |
| SS7 | Neuville / Wydaeghe | Hyundai i20 N Rally1 | 6:02.5 | Tänak / Järveoja |
| SS8 | Evans / Martin | Toyota GR Yaris Rally1 | 3:29.9 | Evans / Martin |
| SS9 | Rovanperä / Halttunen | Toyota GR Yaris Rally1 | 9:00.5 | Evans / Martin |
| SS10 | Evans / Martin | Toyota GR Yaris Rally1 | 6:37.5 | Evans / Martin |
| SS11 | Neuville / Wydaeghe | Hyundai i20 N Rally1 | 8:06.5 | Evans / Martin |
| SS12 | Fourmaux / Coria | Hyundai i20 N Rally1 | 8:59.1 | Evans / Martin |
| SS13 | Evans / Martin | Toyota GR Yaris Rally1 | 6:42.4 | Evans / Martin |
| SS14 | Neuville / Wydaeghe | Hyundai i20 N Rally1 | 8:14.9 | Evans / Martin |
| SS15 | Neuville / Wydaeghe | Hyundai i20 N Rally1 | 3:29.5 | Evans / Martin |
| SS16 | Katsuta / Johnston | Toyota GR Yaris Rally1 | 14:15.3 | Katsuta / Johnston |
| SS17 | Evans / Martin | Toyota GR Yaris Rally1 | 14:13.3 | Evans / Martin |
| SS18 | Evans / Martin | Toyota GR Yaris Rally1 | 4:58.9 | Evans / Martin |

==== Championship standings ====
Drivers' Standings
| Move | Pos. | Driver | Points |
|---|---|---|---|
| 1 | 1 | Elfyn Evans | 61 |
| 1 | 2 | Sébastien Ogier | 33 |
| 1 | 3 | Kalle Rovanperä | 31 |
| 2 | 4 | Thierry Neuville | 29 |
| | 5 | Ott Tänak | 26 |

Co-drivers' Standings
| Move | Pos. | Driver | Points |
|---|---|---|---|
| 1 | 1 | Scott Martin | 61 |
| 1 | 2 | Vincent Landais | 33 |
| 1 | 3 | Jonne Halttunen | 31 |
| 2 | 4 | Martijn Wydaeghe | 29 |
| | 5 | Martin Järveoja | 26 |

Manufacturers' Standings
| Move | Pos. | Driver | Points |
|---|---|---|---|
| | 1 | Toyota Gazoo Racing WRT | 120 |
| | 2 | Hyundai Shell Mobis WRT | 72 |
| | 3 | M-Sport Ford WRT | 25 |
| New entry | 4 | Toyota Gazoo Racing WRT2 | 11 |

=== WRC2 Rally2 ===
==== Classification ====
| Position | | No. | Driver | Co-driver | Entrant | Car | Time | Difference | Points | |
| Event | Class | No. | Driver | Co-driver | Entrant | Car | Time | Difference | Class | Event |
|---|---|---|---|---|---|---|---|---|---|---|
| 9 | 1 | 20 | Oliver Solberg | Elliott Edmondson | Printsport | Toyota GR Yaris Rally2 | 2:42:02.3 | 0.0 | 25 | 2 |
| 10 | 2 | 23 | Roope Korhonen | Anssi Viinikka | Roope Korhonen | Toyota GR Yaris Rally2 | 2:42:44.8 | +42.5 | 17 | 1 |
| 11 | 3 | 25 | Mikko Heikkilä | Kristian Temonen | Mikko Heikkilä | Škoda Fabia RS Rally2 | 2:43:10.6 | +1:08.3 | 15 | 0 |
| 12 | 4 | 26 | Lauri Joona | Samu Vaaleri | Lauri Joona | Škoda Fabia RS Rally2 | 2:43:46.2 | +1:43.9 | 12 | 0 |
| 13 | 5 | 29 | Isak Reiersen | Stefan Gustavsson | Isak Reiersen | Škoda Fabia RS Rally2 | 2:45:05.7 | +3:03.4 | 10 | 0 |
| 14 | 6 | 27 | Fabrizio Zaldivar | Marcelo Der Ohannesian | Toksport WRT | Škoda Fabia RS Rally2 | 2:45:37.6 | +3:35.3 | 8 | 0 |
| 15 | 7 | 30 | Romet Jürgenson | Siim Oja | FIA Rally Star | Ford Fiesta Rally2 | 2:45:47.9 | +3:45.6 | 6 | 0 |
| 16 | 8 | 24 | Pontus Tidemand | Jørgen Eriksen | Pontus Tidemand | Škoda Fabia RS Rally2 | 2:46:51.3 | +4:49.0 | 4 | 0 |
| 17 | 9 | 32 | Yuki Yamamoto | James Fulton | Toyota Gazoo Racing WRT NG | Toyota GR Yaris Rally2 | 2:49:19.6 | +7:17.3 | 2 | 0 |
| 23 | 10 | 40 | Alejandro Mauro | Adrián Pérez | Alejandro Mauro | Škoda Fabia RS Rally2 | 2:52:56.1 | +10:53.8 | 1 | 0 |
| 27 | 11 | 36 | Filip Kohn | Ross Whittock | Filip Kohn | Škoda Fabia RS Rally2 | 2:55:08.6 | +13:06.3 | 0 | 0 |
| 29 | 12 | 35 | Michał Sołowow | Maciej Baran | Printsport | Toyota GR Yaris Rally2 | 2:58:02.5 | +16:00.2 | 0 | 0 |
| 31 | 13 | 39 | Jarosław Kołtun | Ireneusz Pleskot | Jarosław Kołtun | Škoda Fabia RS Rally2 | 2:59:55.9 | +17:53.6 | 0 | 0 |
| 35 | 14 | 21 | Georg Linnamäe | James Morgan | Georg Linnamäe | Toyota GR Yaris Rally2 | 3:02:38.5 | +20:36.2 | 0 | 0 |
| 39 | 15 | 42 | Miguel Granados | Marc Martí | Miguel Granados | Škoda Fabia RS Rally2 | 3:05:28.0 | +23:25.7 | 0 | 0 |
| 43 | 16 | 43 | Rachele Somaschini | Nicola Arena | Rachele Somaschini | Citroën C3 Rally2 | 3:15:26.4 | +33:24.1 | 0 | 0 |
| 44 | 17 | 31 | Hikaru Kogure | Topi Matias Luhtinen | Toyota Gazoo Racing WRT NG | Toyota GR Yaris Rally2 | 3:16:40.3 | +34:38.0 | 0 | 0 |
| 50 | 18 | 34 | Tuukka Kauppinen | Sebastian Virtanen | Tuukka Kauppinen | Toyota GR Yaris Rally2 | 3:49:19.2 | +1:07:16.9 | 0 | 0 |
| 55 | 19 | 41 | Uğur Soylu | Sener Güray | GP Garage My Team | Škoda Fabia RS Rally2 | 4:03:57.7 | +1:21:55.4 | 0 | 0 |
| Retired SS17 | | 38 | Bernhard ten Brinke | Tom Woodburn | Bernhard ten Brinke | Škoda Fabia RS Rally2 | Off road | | 0 | 0 |

==== Special stages ====
Overall
| Stage | Winners | Car | Time | Class leaders |
|---|---|---|---|---|
| SD | Tidemand / Eriksen | Škoda Fabia RS Rally2 | 2:14.4 | —N/a |
| SS1 | Solberg / Edmondson | Toyota GR Yaris Rally2 | 3:35.3 | Solberg / Edmondson |
| SS2 | Solberg / Edmondson | Toyota GR Yaris Rally2 | 14:40.2 | Solberg / Edmondson |
| SS3 | Solberg / Edmondson | Toyota GR Yaris Rally2 | 11:16.6 | Solberg / Edmondson |
| SS4 | Solberg / Edmondson | Toyota GR Yaris Rally2 | 6:13.6 | Solberg / Edmondson |
| SS5 | Solberg / Edmondson | Toyota GR Yaris Rally2 | 14:37.6 | Solberg / Edmondson |
| SS6 | Linnamäe / Morgan | Toyota GR Yaris Rally2 | 11:27.7 | Solberg / Edmondson |
| SS7 | Korhonen / Viinikka | Toyota GR Yaris Rally2 | 6:21.3 | Solberg / Edmondson |
| SS8 | Solberg / Edmondson | Toyota GR Yaris Rally2 | 3:38.1 | Solberg / Edmondson |
| SS9 | Heikkilä / Temonen | Škoda Fabia RS Rally2 | 9:30.7 | Solberg / Edmondson |
| SS10 | Solberg / Edmondson | Toyota GR Yaris Rally2 | 7:04.2 | Solberg / Edmondson |
| SS11 | Solberg / Edmondson | Toyota GR Yaris Rally2 | 8:36.8 | Solberg / Edmondson |
| SS12 | Solberg / Edmondson | Toyota GR Yaris Rally2 | 9:27.1 | Solberg / Edmondson |
| SS13 | Heikkilä / Temonen | Škoda Fabia RS Rally2 | 7:12.0 | Solberg / Edmondson |
| SS14 | Linnamäe / Morgan | Toyota GR Yaris Rally2 | 8:42.1 | Solberg / Edmondson |
| SS15 | Solberg / Edmondson | Toyota GR Yaris Rally2 | 3:39.0 | Solberg / Edmondson |
| SS16 | Heikkilä / Temonen | Škoda Fabia RS Rally2 | 15:15.8 | Solberg / Edmondson |
| SS17 | Korhonen / Viinikka | Toyota GR Yaris Rally2 | 15:13.9 | Solberg / Edmondson |
| SS18 | Solberg / Edmondson | Toyota GR Yaris Rally2 | 5:12.9 | Solberg / Edmondson |

Challenger
| Stage | Winners | Car | Time | Class leaders |
|---|---|---|---|---|
| SD | Jürgenson / Oja | Ford Fiesta Rally2 | 2:14.7 | —N/a |
| SS1 | Korhonen / Viinikka | Toyota GR Yaris Rally2 | 3:37.6 | Korhonen / Viinikka |
| SS2 | Linnamäe / Morgan | Toyota GR Yaris Rally2 | 14:44.1 | Korhonen / Viinikka |
| SS3 | Korhonen / Viinikka | Toyota GR Yaris Rally2 | 11:21.0 | Korhonen / Viinikka |
| SS4 | Korhonen / Viinikka | Toyota GR Yaris Rally2 | 6:20.4 | Korhonen / Viinikka |
| SS5 | Korhonen / Viinikka | Toyota GR Yaris Rally2 | 14:38.8 | Korhonen / Viinikka |
| SS6 | Linnamäe / Morgan | Toyota GR Yaris Rally2 | 11:27.7 | Korhonen / Viinikka |
| SS7 | Korhonen / Viinikka | Toyota GR Yaris Rally2 | 6:21.3 | Korhonen / Viinikka |
| SS8 | Linnamäe / Morgan | Toyota GR Yaris Rally2 | 3:39.7 | Korhonen / Viinikka |
| SS9 | Heikkilä / Temonen | Škoda Fabia RS Rally2 | 9:30.7 | Korhonen / Viinikka |
| SS10 | Korhonen / Viinikka | Toyota GR Yaris Rally2 | 7:06.3 | Korhonen / Viinikka |
| SS11 | Heikkilä / Temonen | Škoda Fabia RS Rally2 | 8:39.5 | Korhonen / Viinikka |
| SS12 | Korhonen / Viinikka | Toyota GR Yaris Rally2 | 9:28.5 | Korhonen / Viinikka |
| SS13 | Heikkilä / Temonen | Škoda Fabia RS Rally2 | 7:12.0 | Korhonen / Viinikka |
| SS14 | Linnamäe / Morgan | Toyota GR Yaris Rally2 | 8:42.1 | Korhonen / Viinikka |
| SS15 | Linnamäe / Morgan | Toyota GR Yaris Rally2 | 3:39.2 | Korhonen / Viinikka |
| SS16 | Heikkilä / Temonen | Škoda Fabia RS Rally2 | 15:15.8 | Korhonen / Viinikka |
| SS17 | Korhonen / Viinikka | Toyota GR Yaris Rally2 | 15:13.9 | Korhonen / Viinikka |
| SS18 | Korhonen / Viinikka | Toyota GR Yaris Rally2 | 5:15.0 | Korhonen / Viinikka |

==== Championship standings ====
Drivers' Standings
| Move | Pos. | Driver | Points |
|---|---|---|---|
| | 1 | Yohan Rossel | 25 |
| New entry | 2 | Oliver Solberg | 25 |
| 1 | 3 | Eric Camilli | 17 |
| New entry | 4 | Roope Korhonen | 17 |
| 2 | 5 | Léo Rossel | 15 |

Co-drivers' Standings
| Move | Pos. | Driver | Points |
|---|---|---|---|
| | 1 | Arnaud Dunand | 25 |
| New entry | 2 | Elliott Edmondson | 25 |
| 1 | 3 | Thibault de la Haye | 17 |
| New entry | 4 | Anssi Viinikka | 17 |
| 2 | 5 | Guillaume Mercoiret | 15 |

Manufacturers' Standings
| Move | Pos. | Driver | Points |
|---|---|---|---|
| | 1 | PH Sport | 42 |
| New entry | 2 | Toyota Gazoo Racing WRT NG | 42 |
| 1 | 3 | Sarrazin Motorsport – Iron Lynx | 27 |

Challenger Drivers' Standings
| Move | Pos. | Driver | Points |
|---|---|---|---|
| | 1 | Léo Rossel | 25 |
| New entry | 2 | Roope Korhonen | 25 |
| 1 | 3 | Jan Černý | 17 |
| New entry | 4 | Mikko Heikkilä | 17 |
| 2 | 5 | Roberto Daprà | 15 |

Challenger Co-drivers' Standings
| Move | Pos. | Driver | Points |
|---|---|---|---|
| | 1 | Guillaume Mercoiret | 25 |
| New entry | 2 | Anssi Viinikka | 25 |
| 1 | 3 | Ondřej Krajča | 17 |
| New entry | 4 | Kristian Temonen | 17 |
| 2 | 5 | Luca Guglielmetti | 15 |

=== WRC3 Rally3 ===
==== Classification ====
| Position | | No. | Driver | Co-driver | Entrant | Car | Time | Difference | Points |
| Event | Class | No. | Driver | Co-driver | Entrant | Car | Time | Difference | Points |
|---|---|---|---|---|---|---|---|---|---|
| 18 | 1 | 56 | Taylor Gill | Daniel Brkic | FIA Rally Star | Ford Fiesta Rally3 | 2:51:17.7 | 0.0 | 25 |
| 20 | 2 | 45 | Matteo Fontana | Alessandro Arnaboldi | Matteo Fontana | Ford Fiesta Rally3 | 2:52:30.8 | +1:13.1 | 17 |
| 22 | 3 | 54 | Ali Türkkan | Oytun Albaykar | Castrol Ford Team Türkiye | Ford Fiesta Rally3 | 2:52:48.8 | +1:31.1 | 15 |
| 24 | 4 | 47 | Takumi Matsushita | Pekka Kelander | Toyota Gazoo Racing WRT NG | Renault Clio Rally3 | 2:53:07.7 | +1:50.0 | 12 |
| 25 | 5 | 64 | Kerem Kazaz | Corentin Silvestre | Team Petrol Ofisi | Ford Fiesta Rally3 | 2:54:06.0 | +2:48.3 | 10 |
| 30 | 6 | 50 | Adam Grahn | Maja Bengtsson | Adam Grahn | Ford Fiesta Rally3 | 2:58:07.9 | +6:50.2 | 8 |
| 34 | 7 | 65 | Claire Schönborn | Jara Hain | WRC Young Driver Program | Ford Fiesta Rally3 | 3:01:46.3 | +10:28.6 | 6 |
| 36 | 8 | 44 | Mattéo Chatillon | Maxence Cornuau | Mattéo Chatillon | Renault Clio Rally3 | 3:03:27.8 | +12:10.1 | 4 |
| 37 | 9 | 66 | Lyssia Baudet | Léa Sam-Caw-Freve | WRC Young Driver Program | Ford Fiesta Rally3 | 3:04:42.6 | +13:24.9 | 2 |
| 38 | 10 | 61 | Tristan Charpentier | Florian Barral | Tristan Charpentier | Ford Fiesta Rally3 | 3:05:01.4 | +13:43.7 | 1 |
| 42 | 11 | 52 | Eric Royère | Alexis Grenier | Eric Royère | Renault Clio Rally3 | 3:15:20.6 | +24:02.9 | 0 |
| 45 | 12 | 51 | Georgios Vasilakis | Allan Harryman | Georgios Vasilakis | Ford Fiesta Rally3 | 3:18:48.0 | +27:30.3 | 0 |
| 47 | 13 | 57 | Diego Dominguez Jr. | Rogelio Peñate | Diego Dominguez Jr. | Ford Fiesta Rally3 | 3:31:27.5 | +40:09.8 | 0 |
| 49 | 14 | 59 | Max Smart | Cameron Fair | FIA Rally Star | Ford Fiesta Rally3 | 3:39:04.9 | +47:47.2 | 0 |
| 52 | 15 | 46 | Ville Vatanen | Jarno Ottman | Ville Vatanen | Renault Clio Rally3 | 4:00:09.5 | +1:08:51.8 | 0 |
| 53 | 16 | 62 | Joosep Ralf Nõgene | Aleks Lesk | LightGrey | Ford Fiesta Rally3 | 4:01:00.2 | +1:09:42.5 | 0 |
| 56 | 17 | 53 | André Martinez | Matias Aranguren | André Martinez | Ford Fiesta Rally3 | 4:08:50.6 | +1:17:32.9 | 0 |
| Retired SS17 | | 48 | Shotaro Goto | Jussi Lindberg | Toyota Gazoo Racing WRT NG | Renault Clio Rally3 | Mechanical | | 0 |
| Retired SS17 | | 49 | Leevi Lassila | Antti Linnaketo | Leevi Lassila | Renault Clio Rally3 | Mechanical | | 0 |

==== Special stages ====
| Stage | Winners | Car | Time | Class leaders |
|---|---|---|---|---|
| SD | Gill / Brkic | Ford Fiesta Rally3 | 2:18.1 | —N/a |
| SS1 | Vatanen / Ottman | Renault Clio Rally3 | 3:46.9 | Vatanen / Ottman |
| SS2 | Vatanen / Ottman | Renault Clio Rally3 | 15:18.7 | Vatanen / Ottman |
| SS3 | Vatanen / Ottman | Renault Clio Rally3 | 11:48.5 | Vatanen / Ottman |
| SS3 | Lassila / Linnaketo | Renault Clio Rally3 | 11:48.5 | Vatanen / Ottman |
| SS4 | Vatanen / Ottman | Renault Clio Rally3 | 6:31.5 | Vatanen / Ottman |
| SS5 | Lassila / Linnaketo | Renault Clio Rally3 | 15:21.6 | Vatanen / Ottman |
| SS6 | Vatanen / Ottman | Renault Clio Rally3 | 11:54.6 | Vatanen / Ottman |
| SS7 | Lassila / Linnaketo | Renault Clio Rally3 | 6:35.2 | Vatanen / Ottman |
| SS8 | Smart / Fair | Ford Fiesta Rally3 | 3:50.9 | Vatanen / Ottman |
| SS9 | Gill / Brkic | Ford Fiesta Rally3 | 9:54.0 | Lassila / Linnaketo |
| SS10 | Lassila / Linnaketo | Renault Clio Rally3 | 7:31.3 | Lassila / Linnaketo |
| SS11 | Charpentier / Barral | Ford Fiesta Rally3 | 9:10.1 | Lassila / Linnaketo |
| SS12 | Dominguez Jr. / Peñate | Ford Fiesta Rally3 | 9:55.4 | Lassila / Linnaketo |
| SS13 | Chatillon / Cornuau | Renault Clio Rally3 | 7:32.7 | Lassila / Linnaketo |
| SS14 | Chatillon / Cornuau | Renault Clio Rally3 | 9:08.5 | Lassila / Linnaketo |
| SS15 | Chatillon / Cornuau | Renault Clio Rally3 | 3:47.7 | Lassila / Linnaketo |
| SS16 | Vatanen / Ottman | Renault Clio Rally3 | 16:10.9 | Lassila / Linnaketo |
| SS17 | Vatanen / Ottman | Renault Clio Rally3 | 15:59.7 | Gill / Brkic |
| SS18 | Türkkan / Albaykar | Ford Fiesta Rally3 | 5:28.1 | Gill / Brkic |

==== Championship standings ====
Drivers' Standings
| Move | Pos. | Driver | Points |
|---|---|---|---|
| 1 | 1 | Matteo Fontana | 34 |
| 1 | 2 | Arthur Pelamourges | 25 |
| New entry | 3 | Taylor Gill | 25 |
| 1 | 4 | Ghjuvanni Rossi | 15 |
| New entry | 5 | Ali Türkkan | 15 |

Co-drivers' Standings
| Move | Pos. | Driver | Points |
|---|---|---|---|
| 1 | 1 | Alessandro Arnaboldi | 34 |
| 1 | 2 | Bastien Pouget | 25 |
| New entry | 3 | Bastien Pouget | 25 |
| 1 | 4 | Kylian Sarmezan | 15 |
| New entry | 5 | Kylian Sarmezan | 15 |

=== JWRC Rally3 ===
==== Classification ====
| Position | | No. | Driver | Co-driver | Entrant | Car | Time | Difference | Points | |
| Event | Class | No. | Driver | Co-driver | Entrant | Car | Time | Difference | Class | Stage |
|---|---|---|---|---|---|---|---|---|---|---|
| 18 | 1 | 56 | Taylor Gill | Daniel Brkic | FIA Rally Star | Ford Fiesta Rally3 | 2:51:17.7 | 0.0 | 25 | 2 |
| 19 | 2 | 58 | Mille Johansson | Johan Grönvall | Mille Johansson | Ford Fiesta Rally3 | 2:51:40.5 | +22.8 | 17 | 12 |
| 21 | 3 | 60 | Eamonn Kelly | Conor Mohan | Motorsport Ireland Rally Academy | Ford Fiesta Rally3 | 2:52:40.4 | +1:22.7 | 15 | 0 |
| 22 | 4 | 54 | Ali Türkkan | Oytun Albaykar | Castrol Ford Team Türkiye | Ford Fiesta Rally3 | 2:52:48.8 | +1:31.1 | 12 | 1 |
| 25 | 5 | 64 | Kerem Kazaz | Corentin Silvestre | Team Petrol Ofisi | Ford Fiesta Rally3 | 2:54:06.0 | +2:48.3 | 10 | 1 |
| 26 | 6 | 63 | Thomas Martens | Max Freeman | Thomas Martens | Ford Fiesta Rally3 | 2:54:21.9 | +3:04.2 | 8 | 0 |
| 34 | 7 | 65 | Claire Schönborn | Jara Hain | WRC Young Driver Program | Ford Fiesta Rally3 | 3:01:46.3 | +10:28.6 | 6 | 0 |
| 37 | 8 | 66 | Lyssia Baudet | Léa Sam-Caw-Freve | WRC Young Driver Program | Ford Fiesta Rally3 | 3:04:42.6 | +13:24.9 | 4 | 0 |
| 38 | 9 | 61 | Tristan Charpentier | Florian Barral | Tristan Charpentier | Ford Fiesta Rally3 | 3:05:01.4 | +13:43.7 | 2 | 1 |
| 47 | 10 | 57 | Diego Dominguez Jr. | Rogelio Peñate | Diego Dominguez Jr. | Ford Fiesta Rally3 | 3:31:27.5 | +40:09.8 | 1 | 0 |
| 49 | 11 | 59 | Max Smart | Cameron Fair | FIA Rally Star | Ford Fiesta Rally3 | 3:39:04.9 | +47:47.2 | 0 | 1 |
| 53 | 12 | 62 | Joosep Ralf Nõgene | Aleks Lesk | LightGrey | Ford Fiesta Rally3 | 4:01:00.2 | +1:09:42.5 | 0 | 0 |

==== Special stages ====
| Stage | Winners | Car | Time | Class leaders |
|---|---|---|---|---|
| SD | Gill / Brkic | Ford Fiesta Rally3 | 2:18.1 | —N/a |
| SS1 | Johansson / Grönvall | Ford Fiesta Rally3 | 3:48.4 | Johansson / Grönvall |
| SS2 | Gill / Brkic | Ford Fiesta Rally3 | 15:29.0 | Johansson / Grönvall |
| SS3 | Johansson / Grönvall | Ford Fiesta Rally3 | 11:43.2 | Johansson / Grönvall |
| SS4 | Johansson / Grönvall | Ford Fiesta Rally3 | 6:31.4 | Johansson / Grönvall |
| SS5 | Johansson / Grönvall | Ford Fiesta Rally3 | 15:10.8 | Johansson / Grönvall |
| SS6 | Johansson / Grönvall | Ford Fiesta Rally3 | 11:47.3 | Johansson / Grönvall |
| SS7 | Kazaz / Silvestre | Ford Fiesta Rally3 | 6:37.7 | Johansson / Grönvall |
| SS8 | Smart / Fair | Ford Fiesta Rally3 | 3:50.9 | Johansson / Grönvall |
| SS9 | Gill / Brkic | Ford Fiesta Rally3 | 9:54.0 | Johansson / Grönvall |
| SS10 | Johansson / Grönvall | Ford Fiesta Rally3 | 7:28.4 | Johansson / Grönvall |
| SS11 | Charpentier / Barral | Ford Fiesta Rally3 | 9:10.1 | Gill / Brkic |
| SS12 | Johansson / Grönvall | Ford Fiesta Rally3 | 9:48.2 | Gill / Brkic |
| SS13 | Johansson / Grönvall | Ford Fiesta Rally3 | 7:30.9 | Gill / Brkic |
| SS14 | Johansson / Grönvall | Ford Fiesta Rally3 | 9:06.5 | Gill / Brkic |
| SS15 | Johansson / Grönvall | Ford Fiesta Rally3 | 3:47.5 | Gill / Brkic |
| SS16 | Johansson / Grönvall | Ford Fiesta Rally3 | 15:51.5 | Gill / Brkic |
| SS17 | Johansson / Grönvall | Ford Fiesta Rally3 | 15:46.1 | Gill / Brkic |
| SS18 | Türkkan / Albaykar | Ford Fiesta Rally3 | 5:28.1 | Gill / Brkic |

==== Championship standings ====
Drivers' Standings
| Move | Pos. | Driver | Points |
|---|---|---|---|
| New entry | 1 | Mille Johansson | 29 |
| New entry | 2 | Taylor Gill | 27 |
| New entry | 3 | Eamonn Kelly | 15 |
| New entry | 4 | Ali Türkkan | 13 |
| New entry | 5 | Kerem Kazaz | 11 |

Co-drivers' Standings
| Move | Pos. | Driver | Points |
|---|---|---|---|
| New entry | 1 | Johan Grönvall | 29 |
| New entry | 2 | Daniel Brkic | 27 |
| New entry | 3 | Conor Mohan | 15 |
| New entry | 4 | Oytun Albayrak | 13 |
| New entry | 5 | Corentin Silvestre | 11 |

| Previous rally: 2025 Monte Carlo Rally | 2025 FIA World Rally Championship | Next rally: 2025 Safari Rally |
| Previous rally: 2024 Rally Sweden | 2025 Rally Sweden | Next rally: 2026 Rally Sweden |
