= 2025 Junior WRC Championship =

Motorsport season

The 2025 FIA Junior WRC Championship was the twelfth season of Junior WRC, a rallying championship governed by the Fédération Internationale de l'Automobile, running in support of the World Rally Championship. The championship featured five events, beginning in February at the Rally Sweden and concluding in October at the Central European Rally.

Mille Johansson and Johan Grönvall won the drivers' and co-drivers' championships.

== Calendar ==
A map showing the locations of the rallies in the 2025 Junior WRC Championship. Click on the dot to see the rally details.

Round	Start date	Finish date	Rally	Rally headquarters	Surface	Stages	Distance	Ref.
1	13 February	16 February	Rally Sweden	Umeå, Västerbotten County, Sweden	Snow	18	301.16 km	
2	15 May	18 May	Rally de Portugal	Matosinhos, Porto, Portugal	Gravel	24	344.50 km	
3	26 June	29 June	Acropolis Rally Greece	Lamia, Central Greece, Greece	Gravel	17	345.76 km	
4	31 July	3 August	Rally Finland	Jyväskylä, Central Finland, Finland	Gravel	20	307.22 km	
5	16 October	19 October	(Europe) Central European Rally	Bad Griesbach, Bavaria, Germany	Tarmac	18	306.08 km	

== Entries ==
The following crews are set to enter the 2025 Junior WRC Championship:

Car	Entrant	Driver name	Co-driver name	Rounds
Ford Fiesta Rally3	(Turkey) Castrol Ford Team Türkiye	(Turkey) Ali Türkkan	(Turkey) Oytun Albayrak	All
Ford Fiesta Rally3	FIA Rally Star	(Australia) Taylor Gill	(Australia) Daniel Brkic	All
Ford Fiesta Rally3	FIA Rally Star	(South Africa) Max Smart	(United Kingdom) Cameron Fair	1
Ford Fiesta Rally3	FIA Rally Star	(South Africa) Max Smart	(New Zealand) Malcolm Read	2–5
Ford Fiesta Rally3	WRC Young Driver Team	(Germany) Claire Schönborn	(Germany) Jara Hain	1–2
Ford Fiesta Rally3	WRC Young Driver Team	(Germany) Claire Schönborn	(Germany) Michael Wenzel	3–5
Ford Fiesta Rally3	WRC Young Driver Team	(Belgium) Lyssia Baudet	(France) Léa Sam-Caw-Freve	1
Ford Fiesta Rally3	(Republic of Ireland) Motorsport Ireland Rally Academy	(Republic of Ireland) Eamonn Kelly	(Republic of Ireland) Conor Mohan	All
Ford Fiesta Rally3	(Estonia) LightGrey Team	(Estonia) Joosep Ralf Nõgene	(Estonia) Aleks Lesk	1–2
Ford Fiesta Rally3	(Turkey) Team Petrol Ofisi	(Turkey) Kerem Kazaz	(France) Corentin Silvestre	All
Ford Fiesta Rally3	(Finland) Team Flying Finn	(Finland) Aatu Hakalehto	(Finland) Joonas Ojala	4
Ford Fiesta Rally3	Entered under driver's name	(Paraguay) Diego Domínguez Jr.	(Spain) Rogelio Peñate	All
Ford Fiesta Rally3	Entered under driver's name	(Sweden) Mille Johansson	(Sweden) Johan Grönvall	All
Ford Fiesta Rally3	Entered under driver's name	(France) Tristan Charpentier	(France) Florian Barral	1–2
Ford Fiesta Rally3	Entered under driver's name	(Belgium) Thomas Martens	(United Kingdom) Max Freeman	1–4
Ford Fiesta Rally3	Entered under driver's name	(Jordan) Shaker Jweihan	(Lithuania) Aisvydas Paliukėnas	2

== Results and standings ==
=== Season summary ===
Round	Event	Winning driver	Winning co-driver	Winning time	Report	Ref.
1	Rally Sweden	(Australia) Taylor Gill	(Australia) Daniel Brkic	2:51:17.7	Report	
2	Rally de Portugal	(Australia) Taylor Gill	(Australia) Daniel Brkic	4:15:07.3	Report	
3	Acropolis Rally Greece	(Turkey) Ali Türkkan	(Turkey) Oytun Albayrak	4:39:31.7	Report	
4	Rally Finland	(Republic of Ireland) Eamonn Kelly	(Republic of Ireland) Conor Mohan	2:41:21.6	Report	
5	(Europe) Central European Rally	(Sweden) Mille Johansson	(Sweden) Johan Grönvall	2:54:27.8	Report	

=== Scoring system ===
Points are awarded to the top ten classified finishers. An additional point is given for every stage win during a rally. Double points for the final round. The best four results out of five counts towards the final drivers’ and co-drivers’ standings. However, all points gained from stage wins are retained.

Position	1st	2nd	3rd	4th	5th	6th	7th	8th	9th	10th
Points	25	17	15	12	10	8	6	4	2	1

=== FIA Junior WRC Championship for Drivers ===
Pos.	Driver	SWE (Sweden)	POR (Portugal)	GRC (Greece)	FIN (Finland)	EUR (Europe)	Total points	Best 4
1	(Sweden) Mille Johansson	2^{12}	2^{13}	6^{4}	6^{7}	1^{7}	143	135
2	(Australia) Taylor Gill	1^{2}	1^{7}	2^{2}	2^{5}	2^{5}	140	123
3	(Turkey) Ali Türkkan	4^{1}	9	1^{7}	3^{3}	Ret^{4}	69	69
4	(Turkey) Kerem Kazaz	5^{1}	3	4	5	3	78	68
5	(Republic of Ireland) Eamonn Kelly	3	7^{1}	5	1^{3}	Ret	60	60
6	(Paraguay) Diego Domínguez Jr.	10	8^{1}	3^{1}	7	4	52	51
7	(Germany) Claire Schönborn	7	11	8	9	5	32	32
8	(Belgium) Thomas Martens	6	4	Ret^{1}	10		22	22
9	(South Africa) Max Smart	11^{1}	5	7	8	Ret	21	21
10	(Finland) Aatu Hakalehto				4^{2}		14	14
11	(Estonia) Joosep Ralf Nõgene	12	6				8	8
12	(France) Tristan Charpentier	9^{1}	10^{1}				5	5
13	(Belgium) Lyssia Baudet	8					4	4
Pos.	Driver	SWE (Sweden)	POR (Portugal)	GRC (Greece)	FIN (Finland)	EUR (Europe)	Total points	Best 4

Key
Colour	Result
Gold	Winner
Silver	2nd place
Bronze	3rd place
Green	Points finish
Blue	Non-points finish
Blue	Non-classified finish (NC)
Purple	Did not finish (Ret)
Black	Excluded (EX)
Black	Disqualified (DSQ)
White	Did not start (DNS)
White	Cancelled (C)
Blank	Withdrew entry from the event (WD)

Notes:
Superscripts indicate the number of bonus points that drivers received for winning stages during each rally.

=== FIA Junior WRC Championship for Co-Drivers ===
Pos.	Co-driver	SWE (Sweden)	POR (Portugal)	GRC (Greece)	FIN (Finland)	EUR (Europe)	Total points	Best 4
1	(Sweden) Johan Grönvall	2^{12}	2^{17}	6^{4}	6^{7}	1^{7}	143	135
2	(Australia) Daniel Brkic	1^{2}	1^{7}	2^{2}	2^{5}	2^{6}	140	123
3	(Turkey) Oytun Albayrak	4^{1}	9	1^{7}	3^{3}	Ret^{4}	69	69
4	(France) Corentin Silvestre	5^{1}	3	4	5	3	78	68
5	(Republic of Ireland) Conor Mohan	3	7^{1}	5	1^{3}	Ret	60	60
6	(Spain) Rogelio Peñate	10	8^{1}	3^{1}	7	4	52	51
7	(Germany) Michael Wenzel			8	9	5	26	26
8	(United Kingdom) Max Freeman	6	4	Ret^{1}	10		22	22
9	(New Zealand) Malcolm Read		5	7	8	Ret	20	20
10	(Finland) Joonas Ojala				4^{2}		14	14
11	(Estonia) Aleks Lesk	12	6				8	8
12	(Germany) Jara Hain	7	11				6	6
13	(France) Florian Barral	9^{1}	10^{1}				5	5
14	(France) Léa Sam-Caw-Freve	8					4	4
15	(United Kingdom) Cameron Fair	11^{1}					1	1
Pos.	Co-driver	SWE (Sweden)	POR (Portugal)	GRC (Greece)	FIN (Finland)	EUR (Europe)	Total points	Best 4

Key
Colour	Result
Gold	Winner
Silver	2nd place
Bronze	3rd place
Green	Points finish
Blue	Non-points finish
Blue	Non-classified finish (NC)
Purple	Did not finish (Ret)
Black	Excluded (EX)
Black	Disqualified (DSQ)
White	Did not start (DNS)
White	Cancelled (C)
Blank	Withdrew entry from the event (WD)

Notes:
Superscripts indicate the number of bonus points that drivers received for winning stages during each rally.
