= 2025 British Rally Championship =

Rallying series

The British Rally Championship is a rallying series run over the course of a year, that comprises six tarmac and gravel surface events. 2025 is to be the 67th season of the series. The season will commence in Yorkshire on 23 February and is due to conclude on 25 October in the Welsh forests.

Following the Cambrian Rally in October driver William Creighton and regular co-driver Liam Regan were declared champions.

== Calendar ==
For season 2025 there will be six events, three on gravel and three on closed road tarmac surfaces.

In mid-January 2025 the organisers announced the cancellation of the second round of the series, the Severn Valley Stages which was originally scheduled for 12 April 2025. Natural Resources Wales had confirmed to the organisers that due to extensive storm damage, many parts of the forestry estate were inaccessible. Championship organisers will provide further information as it develops.

Jim Clark Rally On 24 May during the Jim Clark Rally based in Duns, a tragic accident involving a competing car resulted in the death of the co-driver. As a result the event was abandoned.

Round	Dates	Event	Rally HQ	Surface	Website
1	23 February	(England) East Riding Stages Rally	Beverley	Tarmac	(website)
-	Cancelled	(Wales) Severn Valley Stages	Builth Wells	Gravel	
2	12 April	(England) Carlisle Stages Rally	Carlisle	Gravel	(website)
3	23-24 May	(Scotland) Jim Clark Rally	Duns	Tarmac	(website)
4	8–9 August	(Scotland) Grampian Forest Rally	Banchory	Gravel	(website)
5	5–7 September	(Wales) Rali Ceredigion	Aberystwyth	Tarmac	(website)
6	25 October	(Wales) Cambrian Rally	Llandudno	Gravel	(website)

== Results ==
Round	Rally name	Podium finishers			
Round	Rally name	Placing	Driver / Co-Driver	Car	Time / Diff leader
1	East Riding Stages Rally (23 February)	1	William Creighton / Liam Regan	Toyota GR Yaris Rally2	47:13.5
1	East Riding Stages Rally (23 February)	2	Keith Cronin / Mikie Galvin	Citroën C3 Rally2	+ 00:23.8
1	East Riding Stages Rally (23 February)	3	James Williams / Ross Whittock	Hyundai i20 N Rally2	+ 00:33.0
2	Carlisle Stages Rally (12 April)	1	Romet Jürgenson / Siim Oja	Ford Fiesta Rally2	45:43.8
2	Carlisle Stages Rally (12 April)	2	William Creighton / Liam Regan	Toyota GR Yaris Rally2	+ 00:14.4
2	Carlisle Stages Rally (12 April)	3	Garry Pearson / Hannah McKillop	Ford Fiesta Rally2	+ 1:05.3
3	Jim Clark Rally (23/24 May) Abandoned after SS8	1	Meirion Evans / Dale Furniss	Toyota GR Yaris Rally2	46:09.7
3	Jim Clark Rally (23/24 May) Abandoned after SS8	2	Callum Black / Jack Morton	Ford Fiesta Rally2	+51.6
3	Jim Clark Rally (23/24 May) Abandoned after SS8	3	Max McRae / Cameron Fair	Citroën C3 Rally2	+1:02.3
4	Grampian Forest Rally (8/9 August)	1	William Creighton / Liam Regan	Toyota GR Yaris Rally2	51:40.0
4	Grampian Forest Rally (8/9 August)	2	Max McRae / Cameron Fair	Citroën C3 Rally2	+ 0:32.5
4	Grampian Forest Rally (8/9 August)	3	Meirion Evans / Dale Furniss	Toyota GR Yaris Rally2	+ 0:42.7
5	Rali Ceredigion (5/7 September)	1	Jon Armmstrong / Shane Byrne	Ford Fiesta Rally2	1:34:52.0
5	Rali Ceredigion (5/7 September)	2	Romet Jürgenson / Siim Oja	Ford Fiesta Rally2	+29.2
5	Rali Ceredigion (5/7 September)	3	William Creighton / Liam Regan	Toyota GR Yaris Rally2	+1:15.2
6	Cambrian Rally (25 October)	1	Max McRae / Cameron Fair	Škoda Fabia RS Rally2	42:29.2
6	Cambrian Rally (25 October)	2	Romet Jürgenson / Siim Oja	Ford Fiesta Rally2	+ +5.6
6	Cambrian Rally (25 October)	3	Meirion Evans / Dale Furniss	Toyota GR Yaris Rally2	+ 23.9

== Championship standings ==
=== Scoring system ===
Top finishing crews score points as follows: 25, 18, 15, 12, 10, 8, 6, 4, 2.

Drivers may nominate one event as their 'joker', on which if they finish in the top five they will score additional points: 5, 4, 3, 2, 1.

Position	1st	2nd	3rd	4th	5th	6th	7th	8th	9th	10th
Points	25	18	15	12	10	8	6	4	2	1
Joker Points	5	4	3	2	1					

For 'Rali Ceredigion' the points total for that rally will be multiplied by 1.5. Joker points will not be effected by this multiplier

Competitors five best scores will count towards their championship total.

Any driver who starts all 6 rallies will be awarded an additional 5 points

=== 2025 BRC Championship Standings ===
Drivers

Pos	Driver	ERS	CSR	JCR	GFR	RCD	CAM	Points
1	William Creighton	25	18		25	22.5	14*	104.5
2	Romet Jürgenson	8	25	1*	8	27	18	86
3	Meirion Evans	12	6	25	15	16*	15	83
4	Callum Black	11*	10	18	10	18		67
5	Max McRae			15	18		25	58
6	Garry Pearson	Ret	15	14*	12	3	10	54
Pos	Driver	ERS	CSR	JCR	GFR	RCD	CAM	Pts

Key
Colour	Result
Gold	Winner
Silver	2nd place
Bronze	3rd place
Green	Non-podium finish
Purple	Did not finish (Ret)
Black	Disqualified (DSQ)
Black	Excluded (EXC)
White	Did not start (DNS)
*	Joker played

Co-Drivers

Pos	Co-Driver	ERS	CSR	JCR	GFR	RCD	CAM	Points
1	Liam Regan	25	18	Ret	25	22.5	14*	90.5
2	Dale Furniss	12	6	25	15	16*		74
3	Siim Oja	8	25	1*	8	27	18	69
4	Jack Morton	11*	10	18	10	18		67
5	Hannah McKillop	Ret	15	14*	12	3	10	44
Pos	Co-Driver	ERS	CSR	JCR	GFR	RCD	CAM	Pts
