= 2024 Junior WRC Championship =

The 2024 FIA Junior WRC Championship was the eleventh season of Junior WRC, a rallying championship governed by the Fédération Internationale de l'Automobile, running in support of the World Rally Championship. The championship featured five events, beginning in February at the Rally Sweden and concluding in September at the Acropolis Rally.

Romet Jürgenson and Siim Oja became the 2024 Junior WRC Champions.

== Calendar ==
A map showing the locations of the rallies in the 2024 Junior WRC Championship. Click on the dot to see the rally details.

Round	Start date	Finish date	Rally	Rally headquarters	Surface	Stages	Distance	Ref.
1	15 February	18 February	Rally Sweden	Umeå, Västerbotten County, Sweden	Snow	18	301.76 km	
2	18 April	21 April	Croatia Rally	Zagreb, Croatia	Tarmac	20	283.28 km	
3	30 May	2 June	(Italy) Rally Italia Sardegna	Olbia, Sardinia, Italy	Gravel	16	266.48 km	
4	1 August	4 August	Rally Finland	Jyväskylä, Central Finland, Finland	Gravel	20	304.81 km	
5	5 September	8 September	Acropolis Rally Greece	Lamia, Central Greece, Greece	Gravel	15	303.17 km	

== Entries ==
The following crews entered into the 2024 Junior WRC Championship:

Car	Driver name	Co-driver name	Rounds
Ford Fiesta Rally3	(Oman) Abdullah Al-Rawahi	(Jordan) Ata Al-Hmoud	1–2
Ford Fiesta Rally3	(Oman) Abdullah Al-Rawahi	(United Kingdom) Ross Whittock	3
Ford Fiesta Rally3	(Spain) Roberto Blach	(Spain) Mauro Barreiro	1–2
Ford Fiesta Rally3	(Kazakhstan) Petr Borodin	(Kazakhstan) Roman Cheprasov	All
Ford Fiesta Rally3	(Bolivia) Bruno Bulacia	(Brazil) Gabriel Morales	1–3
Ford Fiesta Rally3	(Bolivia) Nataniel Bruun	(Argentina) Pablo Olmos	All
Ford Fiesta Rally3	(Republic of Ireland) Eamonn Kelly	(Republic of Ireland) Conor Mohan	All
Ford Fiesta Rally3	(Peru) Jose Caparó	(Mexico) Esther Gutiérrez	All
Ford Fiesta Rally3	(Paraguay) Diego Domínguez Jr.	(Spain) Rogelio Peñate	All
Ford Fiesta Rally3	(Australia) Taylor Gill	(Australia) Daniel Brkic	All
Ford Fiesta Rally3	(Spain) Raúl Hernández	(Spain) José Murado	1–4
Ford Fiesta Rally3	(Sweden) Mille Johansson	(Sweden) Johan Grönvall	1
Ford Fiesta Rally3	(Estonia) Romet Jürgenson	(Estonia) Siim Oja	All
Ford Fiesta Rally3	(Romania) Norbert Maior	(Romania) Francesca Maior	All
Ford Fiesta Rally3	(Peru) André Martinez	(Peru) Guillermo Sierra	1–2
Ford Fiesta Rally3	(Peru) André Martinez	(Argentina) Fernando Mussano	3
Ford Fiesta Rally3	(Peru) André Martinez	(Argentina) Matías Aranguren	4–5
Ford Fiesta Rally3	(Poland) Jakub Matulka	(Poland) Daniel Dymurski	1–3
Ford Fiesta Rally3	(Belgium) Tom Rensonnet	(Belgium) Loïc Dumont	1
Ford Fiesta Rally3	(Belgium) Tom Rensonnet	(France) Manon Deliot	2–5
Ford Fiesta Rally3	(Chile) Gerardo Rosselot	(Argentina) Marcelo Brizio	1, 3–4
Ford Fiesta Rally3	(Germany) Fabio Schwarz	(Austria) Bernhard Ettel	All
Ford Fiesta Rally3	(South Africa) Max Smart	(United Kingdom) Cameron Fair	All
Ford Fiesta Rally3	(Turkey) Ali Türkkan	(Turkey) Burak Erdener	2–5
Ford Fiesta Rally3	(Finland) Leevi Lassila	(Finland) Antti Linnaketo	4
Ford Fiesta Rally3	(Poland) Hubert Laskowski	(Poland) Michał Kuśnierz	4–5

== Results and standings ==
=== Season summary ===
Round	Event	Winning driver	Winning co-driver	Winning time	Report	Ref.
1	Rally Sweden	(Sweden) Mille Johansson	(Sweden) Johan Grönvall	2:49:33.8	Report	
2	Croatia Rally	(Estonia) Romet Jürgenson	(Estonia) Siim Oja	3:02:44.1	Report	
3	(Italy) Rally Italia Sardegna	(Paraguay) Diego Dominguez Jr.	(Spain) Rogelio Peñate	3:33:09.3	Report	
4	Rally Finland	(Australia) Taylor Gill	(Australia) Daniel Brkic	2:49:07.5	Report	
5	Acropolis Rally Greece	(Romania) Norbert Maior	(Romania) Francesca Maria Maior	4:02:05.7	Report	

=== Scoring system ===
Points were awarded to the top ten classified finishers. An additional point was given for every stage win. The best four results out of five counted towards the final drivers’ and co-drivers’ standings. However, all points gained from stage wins were retained.

Position	1st	2nd	3rd	4th	5th	6th	7th	8th	9th	10th
Points	25	18	15	12	10	8	6	4	2	1

=== FIA Junior WRC Championship for Drivers ===
Pos.	Driver	SWE (Sweden)	CRO (Croatia)	ITA (Italy)	FIN (Finland)	GRC (Greece)	Total Points	Best 4
1	(Estonia) Romet Jürgenson	2^{3}	1^{9}	14^{5}	12^{9}	2^{3}	108	108
2	(Romania) Norbert Maior	9^{1}	3^{1}	5	Ret	1^{1}	80	80
3	(Turkey) Ali Türkkan		Ret^{1}	2^{1}	2^{3}	5^{7}	68	68
4	(Australia) Taylor Gill	8	2^{3}	6^{1}	1^{2}	8	69	65
5	(Belgium) Tom Rensonnet	5	10^{1}	12^{2}	3	3	59	59
6	(Paraguay) Diego Domínguez Jr.	Ret^{3}	9^{5}	1	7	9^{1}	46	46
7	(South Africa) Max Smart	10	7	3	11	7	34	34
8	(Peru) Jose Caparó	Ret	6	15	9	4	34	34
9	(Sweden) Mille Johansson	1^{8}					33	33
10	(Kazakhstan) Petr Borodin	7	Ret	4	4^{3}	Ret	33	33
11	(Bolivia) Nataniel Bruun	12	14	8	8	6	24	24
12	(Republic of Ireland) Eamonn Kelly	3	Ret	13	6	WD	23	23
13	(Bolivia) Bruno Bulacia	DNS	4	9^{4}			18	18
14	(Spain) Raúl Hernández	4^{1}	13^{1}	Ret^{1}	WD		15	15
15	(Chile) Gerardo Rosselot	6^{1}		7	Ret		15	15
16	(Germany) Fabio Schwarz	Ret	12	11	5	Ret^{1}	11	11
17	(Spain) Roberto Blach	11	5				10	10
18	(Poland) Jakub Matulka	15^{1}	8	WD			5	5
19	(Peru) Andre Martinez	13	11	10	10	11	2	2
20	(Poland) Hubert Laskowski				DSQ	10^{1}	2	2
Pos.	Driver	SWE (Sweden)	CRO (Croatia)	ITA (Italy)	FIN (Finland)	GRC (Greece)	Total Points	Best 4

Key
Colour	Result
Gold	Winner
Silver	2nd place
Bronze	3rd place
Green	Points finish
Blue	Non-points finish
Blue	Non-classified finish (NC)
Purple	Did not finish (Ret)
Black	Excluded (EX)
Black	Disqualified (DSQ)
White	Did not start (DNS)
White	Cancelled (C)
Blank	Withdrew entry from the event (WD)

Notes:
Superscripts indicate the number of bonus points that drivers received for winning stages during each rally.

=== FIA Junior WRC Championship for Co-Drivers ===
Pos.	Driver	SWE (Sweden)	CRO (Croatia)	ITA (Italy)	FIN (Finland)	GRC (Greece)	Total Points	Best 4
1	(Estonia) Siim Oja	2^{3}	1^{9}	14^{5}	12^{9}	2^{3}	108	108
2	(Romania) Francesca Maior	9^{1}	3^{1}	5	Ret	1^{1}	80	80
3	(Turkey) Burak Erdener		Ret^{1}	2^{1}	2^{3}	5^{7}	68	68
4	(Australia) Daniel Brkic	8	2^{3}	6^{1}	1^{2}	8	69	65
5	(France) Manon Deliot		10^{1}	12^{2}	3	3	49	49
6	(Spain) Rogelio Peñate	Ret^{3}	9^{5}	1	7	9^{1}	46	46
7	(United Kingdom) Cameron Fair	10	7	3	11	7	34	34
8	(Spain) Esther Gutiérrez Porras	Ret	6	15	9	4	34	34
9	(Sweden) Johan Grönvall	1^{8}					33	33
10	(Kazakhstan) Roman Cheprasov	7	Ret	4	4^{3}		33	33
11	(Argentina) Pablo Olmos	12	14	8	8	6	24	24
12	(Republic of Ireland) Conor Mohan	3	Ret	13	7	WD	23	23
13	(Brazil) Gabriel Morales	DNS	4	9^{4}			18	18
14	(Spain) José Murado	4^{1}	13^{1}	Ret^{1}	WD		15	15
15	(Argentina) Marcelo Brizio	6^{1}		7	Ret		15	15
16	(Spain) Mauro Barreiro	11	5				10	10
17	(Austria) Bernhard Ettel	Ret	12	11	5		10	10
18	(Belgium) Loïc Dumont	5					10	10
19	(Poland) Daniel Dymurski	15^{1}	8	WD			5	5
20	(Poland) Michał Kuśnierz				DSQ	10^{1}	2	2
21	(Argentina) Matías Aranguren				10	11	1	1
22	(Argentina) Fernando Mussano			10			1	1
Pos.	Driver	SWE (Sweden)	CRO (Croatia)	ITA (Italy)	FIN (Finland)	GRC (Greece)	Total Points	Best 4

Key
Colour	Result
Gold	Winner
Silver	2nd place
Bronze	3rd place
Green	Points finish
Blue	Non-points finish
Blue	Non-classified finish (NC)
Purple	Did not finish (Ret)
Black	Excluded (EX)
Black	Disqualified (DSQ)
White	Did not start (DNS)
White	Cancelled (C)
Blank	Withdrew entry from the event (WD)

Notes:
Superscripts indicate the number of bonus points that drivers received for winning stages during each rally.

== See also ==
- FIA Rally Star
