= Romet Jürgenson =

Estonian rally driver

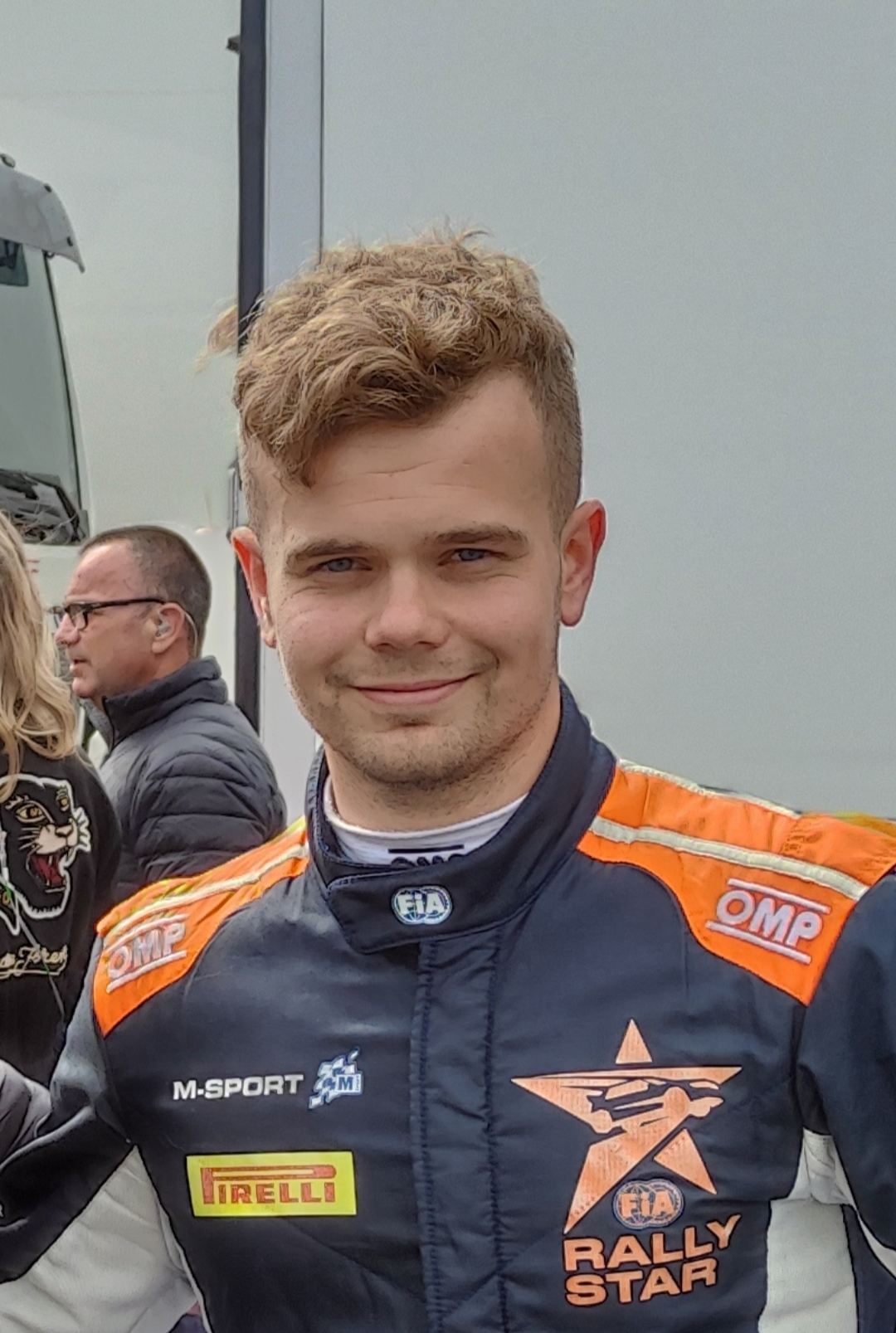
- Jürgenson at the 2024 Rally Estonia

Personal information
- Nationality: (Estonia) Estonian
- Born: 22 December 1999 (age 26); Paide, Estonia

World Rally Championship record
- Years active: 2023–present
- Co-driver: (Estonia) Siim Oja
- Teams: M-Sport Ford WRT
- Rallies: 25
- Championships: 0
- Rally wins: 0
- Podiums: 0
- Stage wins: 0
- Total points: 0
- First rally: 2023 Croatia Rally

Romet Jürgenson (born 22 December 1999) is an Estonian rally driver who currently competes in the World Rally Championship for M-Sport Ford WRT. He won the 2024 Junior World Rally Championship. Jürgenson is also 2023 European Rally Trophy Junior champion.

== Career ==
=== 2022 ===
Jürgenson won the WRC 9 video game Europe competition. Thanks to that, he got a chance to compete in FIA Rally Star program final in Germany, Estering rallycross circuit, where he was selected as the winner. The prize was six rallys with Ford Fiesta Rally3.

=== 2023 ===
In 2023, Jürgenson started the FIA Rally Star season with five other competitors. He made his WRC debut at the 2023 Croatia Rally with Ford Fiesta Rally4. Showing great speed and pace, Jürgenson was selected one of four FIA Rally Star drivers to compete full season in 2024 JWRC.

=== 2024 ===
Jürgenson started 2024 JWRC season in Rally Sweden. He finished in second place behind Mille Johansson. In Croatia, he won the rally by two minutes over second place and gaining nine stage wins. The following rounds in Sardegna and Finland were a disappointment for Jürgenson due to technical problem in Sardegna and a driving mistake in Finland. Jürgenson still maintained the lead in the championship due to the points gained from the stage wins. At the final round in Greece, Jürgenson achieved a second place finish, therefore becoming a 2024 JWRC champion. For winning the JWRC championship, he was rewarded a prize to drive in six rallies in 2025 WRC2 with Ford Fiesta Rally2.

=== 2025 ===
Jürgenson's JWRC title ensured him a prize supplied by M-Sport of tackling at least four WRC2 rounds in the Ford Fiesta Rally2, and Rally Star redirected its budget to supplement the M-Sport prize and enable its standard bearer to contest a full WRC2 campaign. Along with this, Jürgenson competed in the 2025 British Rally Championship in the same Ford Fiesta Rally2 machine alongside Elliot Payne in another M-Sport funded venture. He opened the season with an extremely strong sixth place at the East Riding Stages Rally, almost taking a stage win on the fourth stage. Since the Ford Rally2 car was not competitive anymore, he ended the WRC2 season in 13th place and scoring 34 points. In the British Rally Championship, Jürgenson finished second in overall standings.

=== 2026 ===
In December 2025, it was announced that Jürgenson will continue with M-Sport in the 2026, driving with newly upgraded Ford Fiesta Rally2.

== Rally victories ==
=== WRC3 victories ===
#	Event	Season	Co-driver	Car
1	2024 Croatia Rally	2024	(Estonia) Siim Oja	Ford Fiesta Rally3

=== JWRC victories ===
#	Event	Season	Co-driver	Car
1	2024 Croatia Rally	2024	(Estonia) Siim Oja	Ford Fiesta Rally3

=== ERC3 victories ===
#	Event	Season	Co-driver	Car
1	2024 Rally Estonia	2024	(Estonia) Siim Oja	Ford Fiesta Rally3

=== Other notable victories ===
#	Event	Season	Co-driver	Car
1	(England) 11th Carlisle Stages Rally	2025	(Estonia) Siim Oja	Ford Fiesta Rally2
2	(Spain) 62nd Rally Blendio Princesa de Asturias	2025	(Estonia) Aleks Lesk	Ford Fiesta Rally2

== Results ==
=== WRC results ===
Year	Entrant	Car	1	2	3	4	5	6	7	8	9	10	11	12	13	14	Pos.	Points
2023	Romet Jürgenson	Ford Fiesta Rally4	MON	SWE	MEX	CRO; 24	POR	ITA	KEN								NC	0
2023	Team Estonia Autosport	Ford Fiesta Rally4								EST; 30	FIN	GRE	CHL	EUR	JPN		NC	0
2024	FIA Rally Star	Ford Fiesta Rally3	MON	SWE; 17	KEN	CRO; 20	POR	ITA; 56	POL	LAT	FIN; 52	GRE; 19	CHL	EUR	JPN		NC	0
2025	FIA Rally Star	Ford Fiesta Rally2	MON	SWE; 15	KEN	ESP; 53	POR; 21	ITA; 13	GRE	EST; 15	FIN; 17	PAR	CHL	EUR	JPN	SAU	NC	0
2026	M-Sport Ford WRT	Ford Fiesta Rally2	MON; 16	SWE; 36	KEN; Ret	CRO; 13	ESP; 23	POR; 23	JPN; 14	GRE; 38	EST; 18	FIN; 13	PAR; Ret	CHL; Ret	ITA		NC	0

* Season still in progress.

=== WRC2 results ===
Year	Entrant	Car	1	2	3	4	5	6	7	8	9	10	11	12	13	14	Pos.	Points
2025	FIA Rally Star	Ford Fiesta Rally2	MON	SWE; 7	KEN	ESP; 27	POR; 11	ITA; 5	GRE	EST; 5	FIN; 6	PAR	CHL	EUR	JPN	SAU	13th	34
2026	M-Sport Ford WRT	Ford Fiesta Rally2	MON	SWE; 14	KEN; Ret	CRO; 10	ESP	POR; 11	JPN	GRE	EST; 8	FIN; 5	PAR; Ret	CHL	ITA		23rd	15

* Season still in progress.

=== ERC results ===
Year	Entrant	Car	1	2	3	4	5	6	7	8	Pos.	Points
2025	M-Sport Ford WRT	Ford Fiesta Rally2	ESP	HUN	SWE	POL	ITA	CZE	GBR; 2	CRO; 4	7th	50

* Season still in progress.

=== WRC3 results ===
Year	Entrant	Car	1	2	3	4	5	6	7	8	9	10	11	12	13	Pos.	Points
2024	FIA Rally Star	Ford Fiesta Rally3	MON	SWE; 2	KEN	CRO; 1	POR	ITA; 12	POL	LAT	FIN; 13	GRE; 2	CHL	EUR	JPN	3rd	61

=== JWRC results ===
Year	Entrant	Car	1	2	3	4	5	WDC	Points
2024	FIA Rally Star	Ford Fiesta Rally3	SWE; 2	CRO; 1	ITA; 14	FIN; 12	GRE; 2	1st	108

=== ERC3 results ===
Year	Entrant	Car	1	2	3	4	5	6	7	8	Pos.	Points
2024	Team Estonia Autosport	Ford Fiesta Rally3	HUN	CAN	SWE	EST; 1	ITA	CZE	GBR	POL	6th	30
