= 2025 Rally Finland =

Motor rally competition

2025 Rally Finland Secto Rally Finland 2025
Round 9 of 14 in the 2025 World Rally Championship
← Previous event	Next event →
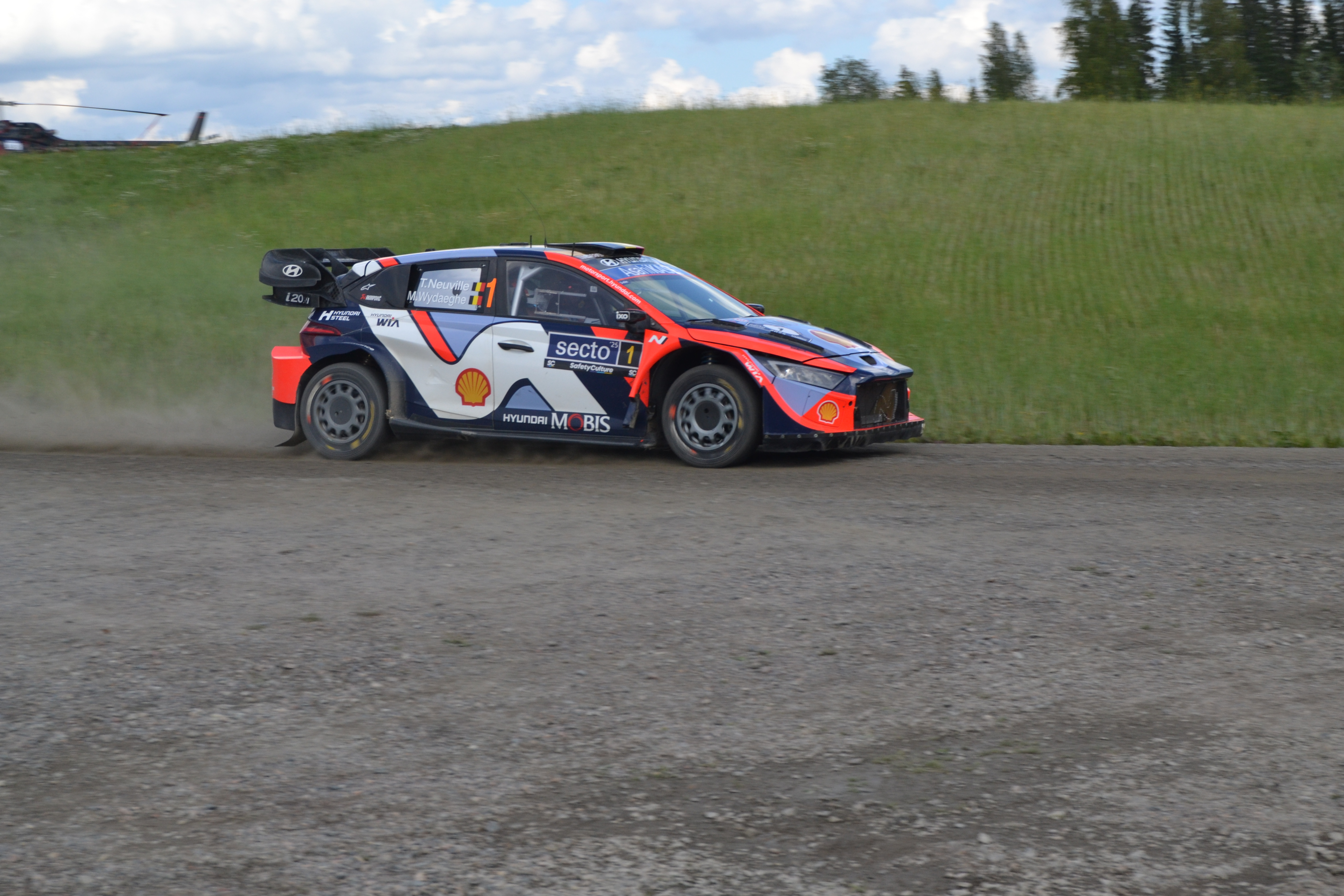
- Rally Finland has the fastest average speed of any event on the calendar.
- Host country: Finland
- Rally base: Jyväskylä, Central Finland
- Dates run: 31 July – 3 August 2025
- Start location: Jyväskylä, Central Finland
- Finish location: Jyväskylä, Central Finland
- Stages: 20 (307.22 km; 190.90 miles)
- Stage surface: Gravel
- Transport distance: 1,093.17 km (679.26 miles)
- Overall distance: 1,400.39 km (870.16 miles)

Statistics
- Crews registered: 66
- Crews: 65 at start, 54 at finish

Overall results
- Overall winner: (Finland) Kalle Rovanperä (Finland) Jonne Halttunen (Japan) Toyota Gazoo Racing WRT; 2:21:51.4
- Sunday Accumulated leader: (Finland) Kalle Rovanperä (Finland) Jonne Halttunen (Japan) Toyota Gazoo Racing WRT; 20:22.6
- Power Stage winner: (Finland) Kalle Rovanperä (Finland) Jonne Halttunen (Japan) Toyota Gazoo Racing WRT; 10:04.9

Support category results
- WRC-2 winner: (Finland) Roope Korhonen (Finland) Anssi Viinikka; 2:29:47.8
- WRC-3 winner: (Australia) Taylor Gill (Australia) Daniel Brkic; FIA Rally Star; 2:41:29.9
- J-WRC winner: (Republic of Ireland) Eamonn Kelly (Republic of Ireland) Conor Mohan (Republic of Ireland) Motorsport Ireland Rally Academy; 2:41:21.6

The 2025 Rally Finland (also known as the Secto Rally Finland 2025) was a motor racing event for rally cars held over four days from 31 July to 3 August 2025. It marked the seventy-fourth running of the Rally Finland, and was the ninth round of the 2025 World Rally Championship, 2025 WRC2 Championship and 2025 WRC3 Championship. The event also was the fourth round of the 2025 Junior WRC Championship. The 2025 event was based in Jyväskylä in Central Finland and was contested over twenty special stages, covering a total competitive distance of 307.22 km (190.90 mi).

Sébastien Ogier and Vincent Landais were the defending rally winners, and their team, Toyota Gazoo Racing WRT, were the defending manufacturer's winners. Oliver Solberg and Elliott Edmondson were the defending rally winners in the WRC2 category. Jesse Kallio and Ville Pynnönen were the defending rally winners in the WRC3 category. Taylor Gill and Daniel Brkic were the defending rally winners in the junior championship.

Kalle Rovanperä and Jonne Halttunen won the rally, and their team, Toyota, successfully defended their titles. Roope Korhonen and Anssi Viinikka were the winners in the WRC2 category. Taylor Gill and Daniel Brkic were the winners in the WRC3 category. Eamonn Kelly and Conor Mohan were the winners in the junior category.

== Background ==
=== Entry list ===
The following crews entered into the rally. The event was opened to crews competing in the World Rally Championship, its support categories, the WRC2 Championship, the WRC3 Championship and privateer entries that were not registered to score points in any championship. Eleven entered under Rally1 regulations, as were twenty-three Rally2 crews in the WRC2 Championship and nineteen Rally3 crew in the WRC3 Championship. A total of ten crews participated in the Junior World Rally Championship.

Rally1 entries competing in the World Rally Championship
No.	Driver	Co-Driver	Entrant	Car	Championship eligibility	Tyre
1	(Belgium) Thierry Neuville	(Belgium) Martijn Wydaeghe	(South Korea) Hyundai Shell Mobis WRT	Hyundai i20 N Rally1	Driver, Co-driver, Manufacturer	H
5	(Finland) Sami Pajari	(Finland) Marko Salminen	(Japan) Toyota Gazoo Racing WRT2	Toyota GR Yaris Rally1	Driver, Co-driver, Manufacturer, Team	H
8	(Estonia) Ott Tänak	(Estonia) Martin Järveoja	(South Korea) Hyundai Shell Mobis WRT	Hyundai i20 N Rally1	Driver, Co-driver, Manufacturer	H
13	(Luxembourg) Grégoire Munster	(Belgium) Louis Louka	(United Kingdom) M-Sport Ford WRT	Ford Puma Rally1	Driver, Co-driver, Manufacturer	H
16	(France) Adrien Fourmaux	(France) Alexandre Coria	(South Korea) Hyundai Shell Mobis WRT	Hyundai i20 N Rally1	Driver, Co-driver, Manufacturer	H
17	(France) Sébastien Ogier	(France) Vincent Landais	(Japan) Toyota Gazoo Racing WRT	Toyota GR Yaris Rally1	Driver, Co-driver, Manufacturer	H
18	(Japan) Takamoto Katsuta	(Republic of Ireland) Aaron Johnston	(Japan) Toyota Gazoo Racing WRT	Toyota GR Yaris Rally1	Driver, Co-driver	H
22	(Latvia) Mārtiņš Sesks	(Latvia) Renārs Francis	(United Kingdom) M-Sport Ford WRT	Ford Puma Rally1	Driver, Co-driver	H
33	(United Kingdom) Elfyn Evans	(United Kingdom) Scott Martin	(Japan) Toyota Gazoo Racing WRT	Toyota GR Yaris Rally1	Driver, Co-driver, Manufacturer	H
55	(Republic of Ireland) Josh McErlean	(Republic of Ireland) Eoin Treacy	(United Kingdom) M-Sport Ford WRT	Ford Puma Rally1	Driver, Co-driver, Manufacturer	H
69	(Finland) Kalle Rovanperä	(Finland) Jonne Halttunen	(Japan) Toyota Gazoo Racing WRT	Toyota GR Yaris Rally1	Driver, Co-driver, Manufacturer	H

Rally2 entries competing in the WRC2 Championship
No.	Driver	Co-Driver	Entrant	Car	Championship eligibility	Tyre
20	(Sweden) Oliver Solberg	(United Kingdom) Elliott Edmondson	(Finland) Printsport	Toyota GR Yaris Rally2	Driver, Co-driver, Team	H
21	(France) Yohan Rossel	(France) Arnaud Dunand	(France) PH Sport	Citroën C3 Rally2	Team	H
24	(Finland) Roope Korhonen	(Finland) Anssi Viinikka	(Finland) Roope Korhonen	Toyota GR Yaris Rally2	Challenger Driver, Challenger Co-driver	H
25	(Czech Republic) Martin Prokop	(Czech Republic) Michal Ernst	(Czech Republic) Martin Prokop	Škoda Fabia RS Rally2	Challenger Driver, Challenger Co-driver	H
26	(Finland) Lauri Joona	(Finland) Samu Vaaleri	(Finland) Lauri Joona	Škoda Fabia RS Rally2	Challenger Driver, Challenger Co-driver	H
27	(Finland) Mikko Heikkilä	(Finland) Kristian Temonen	(Finland) Mikko Heikkilä	Škoda Fabia RS Rally2	Challenger Driver, Challenger Co-driver	H
28	(France) Léo Rossel	(France) Guillaume Mercoiret	(France) PH Sport	Citroën C3 Rally2	Challenger Driver, Challenger Co-driver, Team	H
29	(Estonia) Romet Jürgenson	(Estonia) Siim Oja	FIA Rally Star	Ford Fiesta Rally2	Challenger Driver, Challenger Co-driver	H
30	(Czech Republic) Jan Černý	(Czech Republic) Jan Hloušek	(Czech Republic) Jan Černý	Citroën C3 Rally2	Challenger Driver, Challenger Co-driver	H
32	(Finland) Emil Lindholm	(Finland) Reeta Hämäläinen	(Germany) Toksport WRT	Škoda Fabia RS Rally2	Driver, Co-driver, Team	H
34	(France) Pablo Sarrazin	(France) Geoffrey Combe	(Italy) Sarrazin Motorsport – Iron Lynx	Citroën C3 Rally2	Challenger Driver, Challenger Co-driver	H
35	(Estonia) Robert Virves	(Estonia) Jakko Viilo	(Germany) Toksport WRT	Škoda Fabia RS Rally2	Challenger Driver, Challenger Co-driver	H
36	(France) Sarah Rumeau	(France) Julie Amblard	(Italy) Sarrazin Motorsport – Iron Lynx	Citroën C3 Rally2	Challenger Driver, Challenger Co-driver	H
37	(Italy) Giovanni Trentin	(Italy) Alessandro Franco	(Italy) MT Racing SRL	Škoda Fabia RS Rally2	Challenger Driver, Challenger Co-driver	H
38	(Japan) Yuki Yamamoto	(Finland) Topi Luhtinen	(Japan) Toyota Gazoo Racing WRT NG	Toyota GR Yaris Rally2	Challenger Driver, Challenger Co-driver	H
39	(Bolivia) Marco Bulacia	(Spain) Diego Vallejo	(Bolivia) Marco Bulacia	Toyota GR Yaris Rally2	Challenger Driver, Challenger Co-driver	H
40	(Finland) Jari-Matti Latvala	(Finland) Janni Hussi	(Finland) JML-WRT Oy	Toyota GR Yaris Rally2	Driver, Co-driver	H
41	(Finland) Tuukka Kauppinen	(Finland) Sebastian Virtanen	(Finland) Tuukka Kauppinen	Toyota GR Yaris Rally2	Challenger Driver, Challenger Co-driver	H
42	(Estonia) Georg Linnamäe	(United Kingdom) James Morgan	(Estonia) Georg Linnamäe	Toyota GR Yaris Rally2	Challenger Driver, Challenger Co-driver	H
43	(Finland) Anssi Rytkönen	(Finland) Juho-Ville Koskela	(Finland) Anssi Rytkönen	Škoda Fabia RS Rally2	Challenger Driver, Challenger Co-driver	H
44	(Finland) Tommi Jylhä	(Finland) Kimmo Nevanpää	(Finland) Tommi Jylhä	Škoda Fabia R5	Challenger Driver, Challenger Co-driver	H
45	(Turkey) Uğur Soylu	(Turkey) Sener Güray	(Turkey) GP Garage My Team	Škoda Fabia RS Rally2	Challenger/Masters Driver, Challenger Co-driver	H
46	(Italy) Maurizio Chiarani	(Italy) Flavio Zanella	(Italy) Maurizio Chiarani	Škoda Fabia RS Rally2	Challenger/Masters Driver, Challenger/Masters Co-driver	H

Rally3 entries competing in the WRC3 Championship and/or the Junior World Rally Championship
No.	Driver	Co-Driver	Entrant	Car	Class eligibility	Tyre
47	(France) Arthur Pelamourges	(France) Bastien Pouget	(France) Arthur Pelamourges	Renault Clio Rally3	WRC3	H
48	(Japan) Takumi Matsushita	(Finland) Pekka Kelander	(Japan) Toyota Gazoo Racing WRT NG	Renault Clio Rally3	WRC3	H
49	(France) Mattéo Chatillon	(France) Maxence Cornuau	(France) Mattéo Chatillon	Renault Clio Rally3	WRC3	H
50	(Japan) Shotaro Goto	(Finland) Jussi Lindberg	(Japan) Toyota Gazoo Racing WRT NG	Renault Clio Rally3	WRC3	H
51	(Estonia) Joosep Ralf Nõgene	(Estonia) Aleks Lesk	(Estonia) Joosep Ralf Nõgene	Renault Clio Rally3	WRC3	H
52	(France) Tom Pellerey	(France) Hervé Faucher	(France) Tom Pellerey	Renault Clio Rally3	WRC3	H
53	(Finland) Ville Vatanen	(Finland) Jarno Ottman	(Finland) Ville Vatanen	Renault Clio Rally3	WRC3	H
54	(Finland) Leevi Lassila	(Finland) Antti Linnaketo	(Finland) Leevi Lassila	Renault Clio Rally3	WRC3	H
56	(Finland) Ville Pynnönen	(Finland) Niklas Heino	(Finland) Ville Pynnönen	Renault Clio Rally3	WRC3	H
57	(Poland) Grzegorz Bonder	(Poland) Łukasz Jastrzębski	(Poland) Grzegorz Bonder	Ford Fiesta Rally3	WRC3	H
58	(Germany) Timo Weigert	(Germany) Jasmin Weigert	(Germany) Timo Weigert	Renault Clio Rally3	WRC3	H
59	(Republic of Ireland) John Coyne	(Republic of Ireland) Killian McArdle	(Republic of Ireland) Motorsport Ireland Rally Academy	Ford Fiesta Rally3	WRC3	H
60	(Australia) Taylor Gill	(Australia) Daniel Brkic	FIA Rally Star	Ford Fiesta Rally3	WRC3, Junior WRC	H
61	(Sweden) Mille Johansson	(Sweden) Johan Grönvall	(Sweden) Mille Johansson	Ford Fiesta Rally3	Junior WRC	H
62	(Turkey) Ali Türkkan	(Turkey) Oytun Albayrak	(Turkey) Castrol Ford Team Türkiye	Ford Fiesta Rally3	WRC3, Junior WRC	H
63	(Turkey) Kerem Kazaz	(France) Corentin Silvestre	(Turkey) Team Petrol Ofisi	Ford Fiesta Rally3	WRC3, Junior WRC	H
64	(Republic of Ireland) Eamonn Kelly	(Republic of Ireland) Conor Mohan	(Republic of Ireland) Motorsport Ireland Rally Academy	Ford Fiesta Rally3	Junior WRC	H
65	(Paraguay) Diego Dominguez Jr.	(Spain) Rogelio Peñate	(Paraguay) Diego Dominguez Jr.	Ford Fiesta Rally3	WRC3, Junior WRC	H
66	(Belgium) Thomas Martens	(United Kingdom) Max Freeman	(Belgium) Thomas Martens	Ford Fiesta Rally3	Junior WRC	H
67	(South Africa) Max Smart	(New Zealand) Malcolm Read	FIA Rally Star	Ford Fiesta Rally3	WRC3, Junior WRC	H
68	(Germany) Claire Schönborn	(Germany) Michael Wenzel	WRC Young Driver Program	Ford Fiesta Rally3	WRC3, Junior WRC	H
70	(Finland) Aatu Hakalehto	(Finland) Joonas Ojala	(Finland) Team Flying Finn	Ford Fiesta Rally3	WRC3, Junior WRC	H

Other major entries
No.	Driver	Co-Driver	Entrant	Car	Tyre
23	(United Kingdom) Gus Greensmith	(Sweden) Jonas Andersson	(United Kingdom) Gus Greensmith	Škoda Fabia RS Rally2	H
31	(Bulgaria) Nikolay Gryazin	(Kyrgyzstan) Konstantin Aleksandrov	(Bulgaria) Nikolay Gryazin	Škoda Fabia RS Rally2	H

=== Itinerary ===
All dates and times are EEST (UTC+3).

Date	No.	Time span	Stage name	Distance
31 July	—	After 9:01	Ruuhimäki [Shakedown]	4.12 km
31 July		After 18:45	Opening ceremony, Jyväskylä Paviljonki	—N/a
31 July	SS1	After 19:05	Harju 1	2.58 km
31 July		19:40 – 19:55	Flexi service A, Jyväskylä Paviljonki	—N/a
1 August	SS2	After 8:03	Laukaa 1	17.96 km
1 August	SS3	After 9:03	Saarikas 1	15.78 km
1 August	SS4	After 10:23	Myhinpää 1	14.47 km
1 August	SS5	After 11:51	Ruuhimäki 1	7.76 km
1 August		12:36 – 13:01	Regroup, Jyväskylä Paviljonki	—N/a
1 August		13:01 – 13:41	Service B, Jyväskylä Paviljonki	—N/a
1 August	SS6	After 14:44	Laukaa 2	17.96 km
1 August	SS7	After 15:44	Saarikas 2	15.78 km
1 August	SS8	After 17:04	Myhinpää 2	14.47 km
1 August	SS9	After 18:35	Ruuhimäki 2	7.76 km
1 August	SS10	After 19:30	Harju 2	2.58 km
1 August		20:05 – 20:50	Flexi service C, Jyväskylä Paviljonki	—N/a
2 August	SS11	After 8:01	Parkkola 1	15.51 km
2 August	SS12	After 9:42	Västilä 1	18.94 km
2 August	SS13	After 10:36	Päijälä 1	20.19 km
2 August	SS14	After 12:05	Leustu 1	16.44 km
2 August		13:05 – 13:35	Regroup, Paviljonki	—N/a
2 August		13:35 – 14:15	Service D, Paviljonki	—N/a
2 August	SS15	After 15:01	Parkkola 2	15.51 km
2 August	SS16	After 16:42	Västilä 2	18.94 km
2 August	SS17	After 17:36	Päijälä 2	20.19 km
2 August	SS18	After 19:05	Leustu 2	16.44 km
2 August		20:15 – 21:00	Flexi service E, Paviljonki	—N/a
3 August	SS19	After 10:35	Ouninpohja 1	23.98 km
3 August		11:15 – 12:35	Regroup, Kakaristo	—N/a
3 August	SS20	After 13:15	Ouninpohja 2 [Power Stage]	23.98 km
3 August		After 14:15	Podium ceremony, Kakaristo	—N/a

== Report ==
=== WRC Rally1 ===
==== Classification ====
Position		No.	Driver	Co-driver	Entrant	Car	Time	Difference	Points			
Event	Class	No.	Driver	Co-driver	Entrant	Car	Time	Difference	Event	Sunday	Stage	Total
1	1	69	Kalle Rovanperä	Jonne Halttunen	Toyota Gazoo Racing WRT	Toyota GR Yaris Rally1	2:21:51.4	0.0	25	5	5	35
2	2	18	Takamoto Katsuta	Aaron Johnston	Toyota Gazoo Racing WRT	Toyota GR Yaris Rally1	2:22:30.6	+39.2	17	3	4	24
3	3	17	Sébastien Ogier	Vincent Landais	Toyota Gazoo Racing WRT	Toyota GR Yaris Rally1	2:22:36.5	+45.1	15	4	3	22
4	4	33	Elfyn Evans	Scott Martin	Toyota Gazoo Racing WRT	Toyota GR Yaris Rally1	2:22:39.5	+48.1	12	2	1	15
5	5	5	Sami Pajari	Marko Salminen	Toyota Gazoo Racing WRT2	Toyota GR Yaris Rally1	2:23:10.2	+1:18.8	10	0	0	10
6	6	1	Thierry Neuville	Martijn Wydaeghe	Hyundai Shell Mobis WRT	Hyundai i20 N Rally1	2:23:52.9	+2:01.5	8	1	2	11
7	7	55	Josh McErlean	Eoin Treacy	M-Sport Ford WRT	Ford Puma Rally1	2:25:58.8	+4:07.4	6	0	0	6
8	8	22	Mārtiņš Sesks	Renārs Francis	M-Sport Ford WRT	Ford Puma Rally1	2:27:08.6	+5:17.2	4	0	0	4
9	9	13	Grégoire Munster	Louis Louka	M-Sport Ford WRT	Ford Puma Rally1	2:27:16.3	+5:24.9	2	0	0	2
10	10	10	Ott Tänak	Martin Järveoja	Hyundai Shell Mobis WRT	Hyundai i20 N Rally1	2:29:29.8	+7:38.4	1	0	0	1
Retired SS20		16	Adrien Fourmaux	Alexandre Coria	Hyundai Shell Mobis WRT	Hyundai i20 N Rally1	Withdrawn		0	0	0	0

==== Special stages ====
Stage	Winners	Car	Time	Class leaders
SD	Katsuta / Johnston	Toyota GR Yaris Rally1	2:13.8	—N/a
SS1	Tänak / Järveoja	Hyundai i20 N Rally1	2:04.0	Tänak / Järveoja
SS2	Pajari / Salminen	Toyota GR Yaris Rally1	8:27.6	Katsuta / Johnston
SS3	Rovanperä / Halttunen	Toyota GR Yaris Rally1	7:19.4	Rovanperä / Halttunen
SS4	Rovanperä / Halttunen	Toyota GR Yaris Rally1	6:31.4	Rovanperä / Halttunen
SS5	Pajari / Salminen	Toyota GR Yaris Rally1	3:51.1	Rovanperä / Halttunen
SS6	Katsuta / Johnston	Toyota GR Yaris Rally1	8:28.8	Rovanperä / Halttunen
SS7	Rovanperä / Halttunen	Toyota GR Yaris Rally1	7:16.2	Rovanperä / Halttunen
SS8	Fourmaux / Coria	Hyundai i20 N Rally1	6:23.3	Rovanperä / Halttunen
SS9	Neuville / Wydaeghe	Hyundai i20 N Rally1	3:54.9	Rovanperä / Halttunen
SS10	Fourmaux / Coria	Hyundai i20 N Rally1	2:08.3	Rovanperä / Halttunen
SS11	Rovanperä / Halttunen	Toyota GR Yaris Rally1	7:22.2	Rovanperä / Halttunen
SS12	Rovanperä / Halttunen	Toyota GR Yaris Rally1	8:16.3	Rovanperä / Halttunen
SS13	Neuville / Wydaeghe	Hyundai i20 N Rally1	9:35.3	Rovanperä / Halttunen
SS14	Rovanperä / Halttunen	Toyota GR Yaris Rally1	7:15.9	Rovanperä / Halttunen
SS15	Ogier / Landais	Toyota GR Yaris Rally1	7:41.3	Rovanperä / Halttunen
SS16	Pajari / Salminen	Toyota GR Yaris Rally1	8:05.3	Rovanperä / Halttunen
SS17	Rovanperä / Halttunen	Toyota GR Yaris Rally1	9:22.6	Rovanperä / Halttunen
SS18	Rovanperä / Halttunen	Toyota GR Yaris Rally1	7:14.0	Rovanperä / Halttunen
SS19	Evans / Martin	Toyota GR Yaris Rally1	10:17.1	Rovanperä / Halttunen
SS20	Rovanperä / Halttunen	Toyota GR Yaris Rally1	10:04.9	Rovanperä / Halttunen

==== Championship standings ====
Drivers' Standings
Move	Pos.	Driver	Points
1	1	Elfyn Evans	176
2	2	Kalle Rovanperä	173
	3	Sébastien Ogier	163
3	4	Ott Tänak	163
	5	Thierry Neuville	125

Co-drivers' Standings
Move	Pos.	Driver	Points
1	1	Scott Martin	176
2	2	Jonne Halttunen	173
	3	Vincent Landais	163
3	4	Martin Järveoja	163
	5	Martijn Wydaeghe	125

Manufacturers' Standings
Move	Pos.	Driver	Points
	1	Toyota Gazoo Racing WRT	458
	2	Hyundai Shell Mobis WRT	371
	3	M-Sport Ford WRT	129
	4	Toyota Gazoo Racing WRT2	85

=== WRC2 Rally2 ===
==== Classification ====
Position		No.	Driver	Co-driver	Entrant	Car	Time	Difference	Points	
Event	Class	No.	Driver	Co-driver	Entrant	Car	Time	Difference	Class	Event
11	1	24	Roope Korhonen	Anssi Viinikka	Roope Korhonen	Toyota GR Yaris Rally2	2:29:47.8	0.0	25	0
12	2	40	Jari-Matti Latvala	Janni Hussi	JML-WRT Oy	Toyota GR Yaris Rally2	2:29:48.9	+1.1	17	0
13	3	44	Robert Virves	Jakko Viilo	Toksport WRT	Škoda Fabia RS Rally2	2:30:30.9	+43.1	15	0
15	4	34	Emil Lindholm	Reeta Hämäläinen	Toksport WRT	Škoda Fabia RS Rally2	2:31:23.1	+1:35.3	12	0
16	5	39	Yuki Yamamoto	James Fulton	Toyota Gazoo Racing WRT NG	Toyota GR Yaris Rally2	2:31:24.6	+1:36.8	10	0
17	6	39	Romet Jürgenson	Siim Oja	FIA Rally Star	Ford Fiesta Rally2	2:31:31.2	+1:43.4	8	0
20	7	43	Martin Prokop	Michal Ernst	Martin Prokop	Škoda Fabia RS Rally2	2:35:08.0	+5:20.1	6	0
21	8	31	Lauri Joona	Samu Vaaleri	Lauri Joona	Škoda Fabia RS Rally2	2:36:15.0	+6:27.2	4	0
22	9	30	Jan Černý	Jan Hloušek	Jan Černý	Citroën C3 Rally2	2:40:24.4	+10:36.6	2	0
28	10	48	Giovanni Trentin	Pietro Elia Ometto	MT Racing SRL	Škoda Fabia RS Rally2	2:42:04.6	+12:16.8	1	0
33	11	36	Pablo Sarrazin	Yannick Roche	Sarrazin Motorsport – Iron Lynx	Citroën C3 Rally2	2:43:45.5	+13:57.7	0	0
34	12	40	Sarah Rumeau	Julie Amblard	Sarrazin Motorsport – Iron Lynx	Citroën C3 Rally2	2:43:50.5	+14:02.7	0	0
41	13	44	Tommi Jylhä	Kimmo Nevanpää	Tommi Jylhä	Škoda Fabia R5	2:52:45.0	+22:57.2	0	0
42	14	54	Uğur Soylu	Sener Güray	GP Garage My Team	Škoda Fabia RS Rally2	2:54:58.3	+25:10.5	0	0
43	15	43	Anssi Rytkönen	Juho-Ville Koskela	Anssi Rytkönen	Škoda Fabia RS Rally2	3:07:21.0	+37:33.2	0	0
47	16	21	Oliver Solberg	Elliott Edmondson	Printsport	Toyota GR Yaris Rally2	3:13:13.7	+43:25.9	0	0
51	17	46	Maurizio Chiarani	Flavio Zanella	Maurizio Chiarani	Škoda Fabia RS Rally2	3:39:45.7	+1:09:57.9	0	0
Retired SS18		44	Georg Linnamäe	James Morgan	Georg Linnamäe	Toyota GR Yaris Rally2	Lost wheel		0	0
Retired SS16		27	Mikko Heikkilä	Kristian Temonen	Mikko Heikkilä	Škoda Fabia RS Rally2	Accident		0	0
Retired SS10		41	Tuukka Kauppinen	Sebastian Virtanen	Tuukka Kauppinen	Toyota GR Yaris Rally2	Engine		0	0
Retired SS4		28	Léo Rossel	Guillaume Mercoiret	PH Sport	Citroën C3 Rally2	Mechanical		0	0

==== Special stages ====
Overall
Stage	Winners	Car	Time	Class leaders
SD	Solberg / Edmondson	Toyota GR Yaris Rally2	2:21.5	—N/a
SS1	Virves / Viilo	Škoda Fabia RS Rally2	2:09.4	Virves / Viilo
SS2	Latvala / Hussi	Toyota GR Yaris Rally2	8:48.3	Latvala / Hussi
SS3	Lindholm / Hämäläinen	Škoda Fabia RS Rally2	7:39.0	Latvala / Hussi
SS4	Latvala / Hussi	Toyota GR Yaris Rally2	6:49.3	Latvala / Hussi
SS5	Virves / Viilo	Škoda Fabia RS Rally2	4:02.4	Lindholm / Hämäläinen
SS6	Latvala / Hussi	Toyota GR Yaris Rally2	8:47.2	Latvala / Hussi
SS7	Korhonen / Viinikka	Toyota GR Yaris Rally2	7:41.1	Linnamäe / Morgan
SS8	Korhonen / Viinikka	Toyota GR Yaris Rally2	6:42.0	Korhonen / Viinikka
SS9	Latvala / Hussi	Toyota GR Yaris Rally2	4:07.0	Korhonen / Viinikka
SS10	Korhonen / Viinikka	Toyota GR Yaris Rally2	2:12.6	Korhonen / Viinikka
SS11	Latvala / Hussi	Toyota GR Yaris Rally2	7:49.3	Korhonen / Viinikka
SS12	Latvala / Hussi	Toyota GR Yaris Rally2	8:47.1	Korhonen / Viinikka
SS13	Korhonen / Viinikka	Toyota GR Yaris Rally2	10:07.9	Korhonen / Viinikka
SS14	Latvala / Hussi	Toyota GR Yaris Rally2	7:44.0	Korhonen / Viinikka
SS15	Solberg / Edmondson	Toyota GR Yaris Rally2	7:49.5	Korhonen / Viinikka
SS16	Solberg / Edmondson	Toyota GR Yaris Rally2	8:33.0	Korhonen / Viinikka
SS17	Korhonen / Viinikka	Toyota GR Yaris Rally2	9:52.9	Korhonen / Viinikka
SS18	Latvala / Hussi	Toyota GR Yaris Rally2	7:39.8	Korhonen / Viinikka
SS19	Latvala / Hussi	Toyota GR Yaris Rally2	10:50.9	Korhonen / Viinikka
SS20	Solberg / Edmondson	Toyota GR Yaris Rally2	10:43.6	Korhonen / Viinikka

Challenger
Stage	Winners	Car	Time	Class leaders
SD	Kauppinen / Virtanen	Toyota GR Yaris Rally2	2:23.5	—N/a
SS1	Virves / Viilo	Škoda Fabia RS Rally2	2:09.4	Virves / Viilo
SS2	Linnamäe / Morgan	Toyota GR Yaris Rally2	8:51.2	Virves / Viilo
SS3	Heikkilä / Temonen	Škoda Fabia RS Rally2	7:40.1	Virves / Viilo
SS4	Virves / Viilo	Škoda Fabia RS Rally2	6:50.8	Virves / Viilo
SS5	Virves / Viilo	Škoda Fabia RS Rally2	4:02.4	Virves / Viilo
SS6	Kauppinen / Virtanen	Toyota GR Yaris Rally2	8:51.2	Linnamäe / Morgan
SS7	Korhonen / Viinikka	Toyota GR Yaris Rally2	7:41.1	Linnamäe / Morgan
SS8	Korhonen / Viinikka	Toyota GR Yaris Rally2	6:42.0	Korhonen / Viinikka
SS9	Yamamoto / Luhtinen	Toyota GR Yaris Rally2	4:07.0	Korhonen / Viinikka
SS10	Korhonen / Viinikka	Toyota GR Yaris Rally2	2:12.6	Korhonen / Viinikka
SS11	Virves / Viilo	Škoda Fabia RS Rally2	7:50.6	Korhonen / Viinikka
SS12	Linnamäe / Morgan	Toyota GR Yaris Rally2	8:49.1	Korhonen / Viinikka
SS13	Korhonen / Viinikka	Toyota GR Yaris Rally2	10:07.9	Korhonen / Viinikka
SS14	Korhonen / Viinikka	Toyota GR Yaris Rally2	7:44.3	Korhonen / Viinikka
SS15	Heikkilä / Temonen	Škoda Fabia RS Rally2	8:01.0	Korhonen / Viinikka
SS16	Virves / Viilo	Škoda Fabia RS Rally2	8:36.4	Korhonen / Viinikka
SS17	Korhonen / Viinikka	Toyota GR Yaris Rally2	9:52.9	Korhonen / Viinikka
SS18	Korhonen / Viinikka	Toyota GR Yaris Rally2	7:39.8	Korhonen / Viinikka
SS19	Korhonen / Viinikka	Toyota GR Yaris Rally2	10:51.4	Korhonen / Viinikka
SS20	Korhonen / Viinikka	Toyota GR Yaris Rally2	10:47.2	Korhonen / Viinikka

==== Championship standings ====
Drivers' Standings
Move	Pos.	Driver	Points
	1	Oliver Solberg	85
	2	Yohan Rossel	82
2	3	Roope Korhonen	69
1	4	Gus Greensmith	57
3	5	Robert Virves	50

Co-drivers' Standings
Move	Pos.	Driver	Points
	1	Elliott Edmondson	85
	2	Arnaud Dunand	82
1	3	Anssi Viinikka	69
1	4	Jonas Andersson	57
3	5	Jakko Viilo	50

Manufacturers' Standings
Move	Pos.	Driver	Points
	1	PH Sport	178
	2	Toksport WRT	131
	3	Toyota Gazoo Racing WRT NG	89
	4	Sarrazin Motorsport – Iron Lynx	64

Challenger Drivers' Standings
Move	Pos.	Driver	Points
1	1	Roope Korhonen	90
1	2	Roberto Daprà	71
	3	Kajetan Kajetanowicz	62
1	4	Robert Virves	60
1	5	Jan Solans	55

Challenger Co-drivers' Standings
Move	Pos.	Driver	Points
	1	Anssi Viinikka	90
	2	Maciej Szczepaniak	62
2	3	Jakko Viilo	60
1	4	Luca Guglielmetti	56
1	5	Diego Sanjuan de Eusebio	55

=== WRC3 Rally3 ===
==== Classification ====
Position		No.	Driver	Co-driver	Entrant	Car	Time	Difference	Points
Event	Class	No.	Driver	Co-driver	Entrant	Car	Time	Difference	Points
24	1	60	Taylor Gill	Daniel Brkic	FIA Rally Star	Ford Fiesta Rally3	2:41:29.9	+8.3	25
26	2	62	Ali Türkkan	Oytun Albayrak	Castrol Ford Team Türkiye	Ford Fiesta Rally3	2:41:43.3	+21.7	17
27	3	53	Ville Vatanen	Jarno Ottman	Ville Vatanen	Renault Clio Rally3	2:41:58.9	+37.3	15
29	4	70	Aatu Hakalehto	Joonas Ojala	Team Flying Finn	Ford Fiesta Rally3	2:42:12.0	+50.4	12
30	5	54	Leevi Lassila	Antti Linnaketo	Leevi Lassila	Renault Clio Rally3	2:42:20.3	+58.7	10
31	6	47	Arthur Pelamourges	Bastien Pouget	Arthur Pelamourges	Renault Clio Rally3	2:42:53.6	+1:32.0	8
32	7	63	Kerem Kazaz	Corentin Silvestre	Team Petrol Ofisi	Renault Clio Rally3	2:43:36.5	+2:14.9	6
36	8	64	Diego Dominguez Jr.	Rogelio Peñate	Diego Dominguez Jr.	Ford Fiesta Rally3	2:44:16.7	+2:55.1	4
37	9	56	Ville Pynnönen	Niklas Heino	Ville Pynnönen	Renault Clio Rally3	2:45:00.9	+3:39.3	2
38	10	67	Max Smart	Malcolm Read	FIA Rally Star	Ford Fiesta Rally3	2:46:21.6	+5:00.0	1
39	11	50	Shotaro Goto	Jussi Lindberg	Toyota Gazoo Racing WRT NG	Renault Clio Rally3	2:48:25.7	+7:04.1	0
40	12	68	Claire Schönborn	Michael Wenzel	WRC Young Driver Program	Ford Fiesta Rally3	2:49:34.4	+8:12.8	0
46	13	52	Tom Pellerey	Hervé Faucher	Tom Pellerey	Renault Clio Rally3	3:13:01.8	+31:40.2	0
48	14	58	Timo Weigert	Jasmin Weigert	Timo Weigert	Renault Clio Rally3	3:14:09.3	+32:47.7	0
50	15	57	Grzegorz Bonder	Łukasz Jastrzębski	Grzegorz Bonder	Ford Fiesta Rally3	3:20:31.1	+39:09.5	0
53	16	66	Thomas Martens	Max Freeman	Thomas Martens	Ford Fiesta Rally3	4:04:08.2	+1:22:46.6	0
54	17	49	Mattéo Chatillon	Maxence Cornuau	Mattéo Chatillon	Renault Clio Rally3	4:13:42.8	+1:32:21.2	0
Retired SS20		51	Joosep Ralf Nõgene	Aleks Lesk	Joosep Ralf Nõgene	Renault Clio Rally3	Retired		0
Retired SS12		59	John Coyne	Killian McArdle	Motorsport Ireland Rally Academy	Ford Fiesta Rally3	Accident		0
Retired SS4		48	Takumi Matsushita	Pekka Kelander	Toyota Gazoo Racing WRT NG	Renault Clio Rally3	Mechanical		0

==== Special stages ====
Stage	Winners	Car	Time	Class leaders
SD	Pelamourges / Pouget	Renault Clio Rally3	2:30.0	—N/a
SS1	Chatillon / Cornuau	Renault Clio Rally3	2:19.6	Chatillon / Cornuau
SS2	Nõgene / Lesk	Renault Clio Rally3	9:24.9	Türkkan / Albayrak
SS3	Nõgene / Lesk	Renault Clio Rally3	8:13.1	Nõgene / Lesk
SS4	Hakalehto / Ojala	Ford Fiesta Rally3	7:17.2	Gill / Brkic
SS5	Gill / Brkic	Ford Fiesta Rally3	4:31.2	Gill / Brkic
SS6	Pellerey / Faucher	Renault Clio Rally3	9:23.4	Gill / Brkic
SS7	Gill / Brkic	Ford Fiesta Rally3	8:24.5	Gill / Brkic
SS8	Gill / Brkic	Ford Fiesta Rally3	7:14.6	Gill / Brkic
SS9	Gill / Brkic	Ford Fiesta Rally3	4:25.3	Gill / Brkic
SS10	Gill / Brkic	Ford Fiesta Rally3	2:20.8	Gill / Brkic
SS11	Vatanen / Ottman	Renault Clio Rally3	8:15.8	Gill / Brkic
SS12	Vatanen / Ottman	Renault Clio Rally3	9:18.4	Gill / Brkic
SS13	Vatanen / Ottman	Renault Clio Rally3	10:48.7	Gill / Brkic
SS14	Gill / Brkic	Ford Fiesta Rally3	8:43.9	Gill / Brkic
SS15	Vatanen / Ottman	Renault Clio Rally3	8:28.6	Gill / Brkic
SS16	Vatanen / Ottman	Renault Clio Rally3	9:10.5	Gill / Brkic
SS17	Lassila / Linnaketo	Renault Clio Rally3	10:43.8	Türkkan / Albayrak
SS18	Türkkan / Albayrak	Ford Fiesta Rally3	8:18.1	Türkkan / Albayrak
SS19	Gill / Brkic	Ford Fiesta Rally3	11:28.9	Gill / Brkic
SS20	Gill / Brkic	Ford Fiesta Rally3	11:22.8	Gill / Brkic

==== Championship standings ====
Drivers' Standings
Move	Pos.	Driver	Points
	1	Taylor Gill	92
2	2	Arthur Pelamourges	60
1	3	Matteo Fontana	59
2	4	Ali Türkkan	59
2	5	Takumi Matsushita	57

Co-drivers' Standings
Move	Pos.	Driver	Points
	1	Daniel Brkic	92
1	2	Bastien Pouget	60
1	3	Alessandro Arnaboldi	59
1	4	Oytun Albaykar	59
1	5	Corentin Silvestre	55

=== JWRC Rally3 ===
==== Classification ====
Position		No.	Driver	Co-driver	Entrant	Car	Time	Difference	Points	
Event	Class	No.	Driver	Co-driver	Entrant	Car	Time	Difference	Class	Stage
23	1	64	Eamonn Kelly	Conor Mohan	Motorsport Ireland Rally Academy	Ford Fiesta Rally3	2:41:21.6	0.0	25	3
24	2	60	Taylor Gill	Daniel Brkic	FIA Rally Star	Ford Fiesta Rally3	2:41:29.9	+8.3	17	5
26	3	62	Ali Türkkan	Oytun Albayrak	Castrol Ford Team Türkiye	Ford Fiesta Rally3	2:41:43.3	+21.7	15	3
29	4	70	Aatu Hakalehto	Joonas Ojala	Team Flying Finn	Ford Fiesta Rally3	2:42:12.0	+50.4	12	2
32	5	63	Kerem Kazaz	Corentin Silvestre	Team Petrol Ofisi	Renault Clio Rally3	2:43:36.5	+2:14.9	10	0
36	6	61	Diego Dominguez Jr.	Rogelio Peñate	Diego Dominguez Jr.	Ford Fiesta Rally3	2:43:53.0	+2:31.4	8	7
37	7	65	Ville Pynnönen	Niklas Heino	Ville Pynnönen	Renault Clio Rally3	2:44:16.7	+2:55.1	6	0
38	8	67	Max Smart	Malcolm Read	FIA Rally Star	Ford Fiesta Rally3	2:46:21.6	+5:00.0	4	0
40	9	68	Claire Schönborn	Michael Wenzel	WRC Young Driver Program	Ford Fiesta Rally3	2:49:34.4	+8:12.8	2	0
53	10	66	Thomas Martens	Max Freeman	Thomas Martens	Ford Fiesta Rally3	4:04:08.2	+1:22:46.6	1	0

==== Special stages ====
Stage	Winners	Car	Time	Class leaders
SD	Kazaz / Silvestre	Ford Fiesta Rally3	2:32.5	—N/a
SS1	Türkkan / Albayrak	Ford Fiesta Rally3	2:20.2	Türkkan / Albayrak
SS2	Hakalehto / Ojala	Ford Fiesta Rally3	9:25.4	Türkkan / Albayrak
SS3	Kelly / Mohan	Ford Fiesta Rally3	8:08.5	Johansson / Grönvall
SS4	Hakalehto / Ojala	Ford Fiesta Rally3	7:17.2	Johansson / Grönvall
SS5	Johansson / Grönvall	Ford Fiesta Rally3	4:30.6	Johansson / Grönvall
SS6	Johansson / Grönvall	Ford Fiesta Rally3	9:23.2	Johansson / Grönvall
SS7	Johansson / Grönvall	Ford Fiesta Rally3	8:24.1	Johansson / Grönvall
SS8	Gill / Brkic	Ford Fiesta Rally3	7:14.6	Gill / Brkic
SS9	Johansson / Grönvall	Ford Fiesta Rally3	4:24.8	Gill / Brkic
SS10	Gill / Brkic	Ford Fiesta Rally3	2:20.8	Gill / Brkic
SS11	Johansson / Grönvall	Ford Fiesta Rally3	8:20.7	Gill / Brkic
SS12	Gill / Brkic	Ford Fiesta Rally3	9:19.1	Gill / Brkic
SS13	Türkkan / Albayrak	Ford Fiesta Rally3	10:49.8	Gill / Brkic
SS14	Kelly / Mohan	Ford Fiesta Rally3	8:42.3	Gill / Brkic
SS15	Johansson / Grönvall	Ford Fiesta Rally3	8:29.5	Gill / Brkic
SS16	Johansson / Grönvall	Ford Fiesta Rally3	9:10.5	Gill / Brkic
SS17	Kelly / Mohan	Ford Fiesta Rally3	10:41.4	Kelly / Mohan
SS18	Türkkan / Albayrak	Ford Fiesta Rally3	8:18.1	Kelly / Mohan
SS19	Gill / Brkic	Ford Fiesta Rally3	11:28.9	Kelly / Mohan
SS20	Gill / Brkic	Ford Fiesta Rally3	11:22.8	Kelly / Mohan

==== Championship standings ====
Drivers' Standings
Move	Pos.	Driver	Points
	1	Taylor Gill	100
	2	Mille Johansson	86
	3	Ali Türkkan	65
1	4	Eamonn Kelly	60
1	5	Kerem Kazaz	48

Co-drivers' Standings
Move	Pos.	Driver	Points
	1	Daniel Brkic	100
	2	Johan Grönvall	86
	3	Oytun Albayrak	65
1	4	Conor Mohan	60
1	5	Corentin Silvestre	48

Previous rally: 2025 Rally Estonia	2025 FIA World Rally Championship	Next rally: 2025 Rally del Paraguay
Previous rally: 2024 Rally Finland	2025 Rally Finland	Next rally: 2026 Rally Finland
