= Ford Fiesta Rally3 =

Ford Rally3 rally car

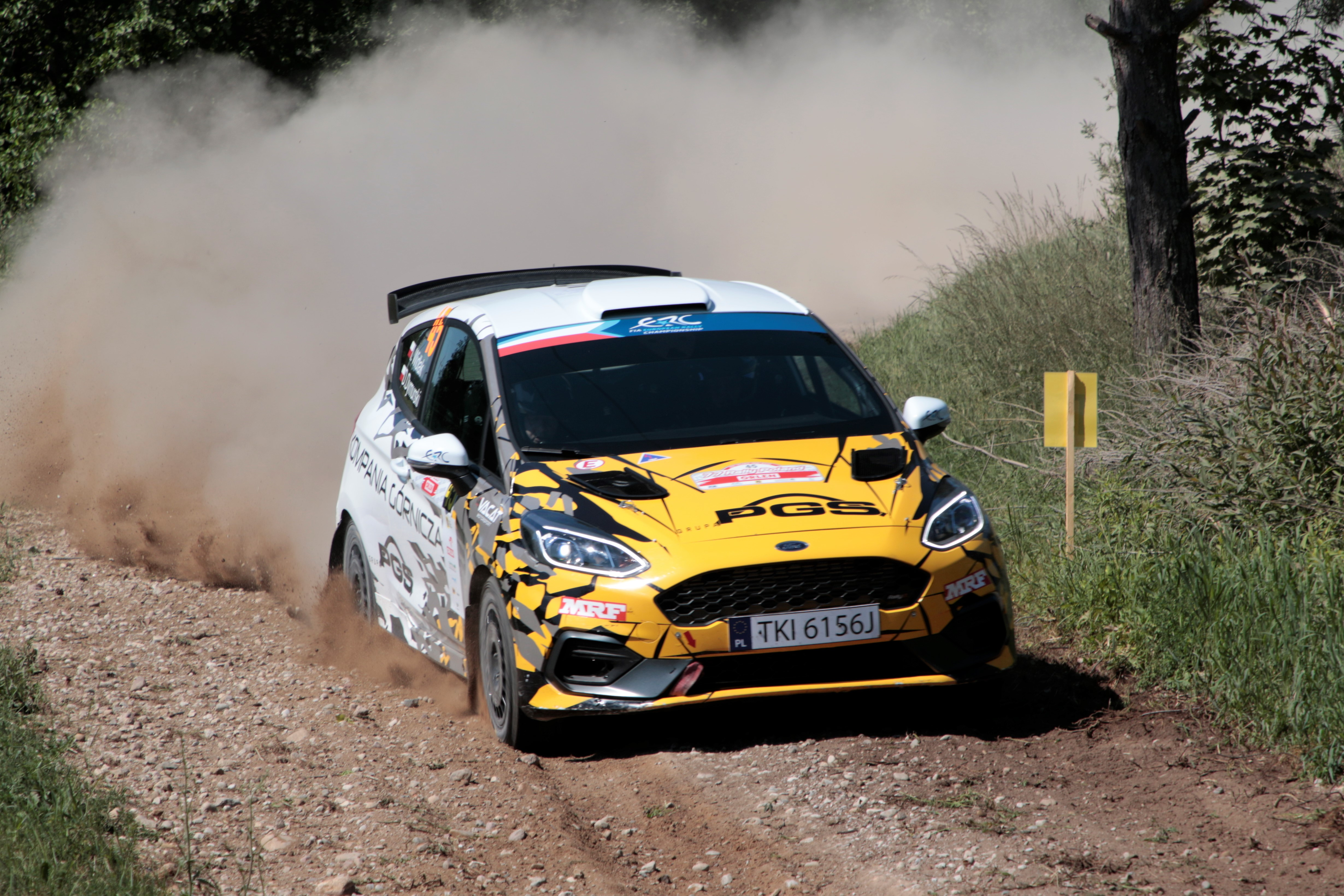
- A Fiesta Rally3 at the 2021 Rally Poland
- Category: Group Rally3
- Constructor: M-Sport
- Designer: Maciej Woda

Technical specifications
- Length: 4065 mm
- Width: 1735 mm
- Wheelbase: 2490 mm
- Engine: Ecoboost 1,497 cubic centimetres (1.497 L; 91.4 cu in) Inline 3 12-valve turbocharged
- Transmission: Sadev 5-speed sequential 4-wheel drive
- Power: 240 brake horsepower (240 PS; 180 kW); 400 newton-metres (300 lbf⋅ft)
- Weight: 1,210 kg (2,667.6 lb)

Competition history
- Debut: 2021

The Ford Fiesta Rally3 is a rally car developed and built by M-Sport to FIA Group Rally3 regulations for use at tier 3 of the FIA Rally Pyramid. It is based upon the Ford Fiesta road car and debuted in 2021.

== Competition history ==
The car was debuted by Estonian driver Ken Torn at SM O.K. Auto-Ralli in Finland, finishing eleventh overall. The car made its WRC debut at the 2021 Croatia Rally with Zoltan Laszlo behind the wheel.

The Fiesta Rally3 made its WRC return during 2021 Rally Estonia, driven by Extreme E regular Molly Taylor with Sebastian Marshall co-driving. The crew crashed out on SS5.

Since 2022, the car is used as the selected vehicle for the Junior WRC Championship. It was the only car in the Rally3 class until 2023 when the Renault Clio Rally3 was homologated by the FIA.

== Rally victories ==
=== WRC3 ===
| Year | No. | Event | Surface | Driver | Co-driver |
|---|---|---|---|---|---|
| 2022 | 1 | (Monaco) 2022 Monte Carlo Rally | Mixed | (Finland) Sami Pajari | (Finland) Enni Mälkönen |
| 2022 | 2 | 2022 Rally Sweden | Snow | (Finland) Lauri Joona | (Finland) Mikael Korhonen |
| 2022 | 3 | 2022 Croatia Rally | Tarmac | (Hungary) Zoltán László | (Hungary) Tamás Kürti |
| 2022 | 4 | 2022 Rally de Portugal | Gravel | (Finland) Sami Pajari | (Finland) Enni Mälkönen |
| 2022 | 5 | (Italy) 2022 Rally Italia Sardegna | Gravel | (Czech Republic) Jan Černý | (Czech Republic) Tomáš Střeska |
| 2022 | 6 | (Kenya) 2022 Safari Rally | Gravel | (Kenya) Maxine Wahome | (Kenya) Murage Waigwa |
| 2022 | 7 | 2022 Rally Estonia | Gravel | (Finland) Sami Pajari | (Finland) Enni Mälkönen |
| 2022 | 8 | 2022 Rally Finland | Gravel | (Finland) Lauri Joona | (Finland) Tuukka Shemeikka |
| 2022 | 9 | (Belgium) 2022 Ypres Rally | Tarmac | (Czech Republic) Jan Černý | (United Kingdom) Tom Woodburn |
| 2022 | 10 | (Greece) 2022 Acropolis Rally | Gravel | (Paraguay) Diego Domínguez Jr. | (Spain) Rogelio Peñate |
| 2022 | 11 | (Spain) 2022 Rally Catalunya | Tarmac | (Finland) Lauri Joona | (Finland) Mikael Korhonen |
| 2023 | 12 | 2023 Rally Sweden | Snow | (Finland) Roope Korhonen | (Finland) Anssi Viinikka |
| 2023 | 13 | 2023 Rally Mexico | Gravel | (Paraguay) Diego Domínguez Jr. | (Spain) Rogelio Peñate |
| 2023 | 14 | 2023 Croatia Rally | Tarmac | (Republic of Ireland) Eamonn Kelly | (Republic of Ireland) Conor Mohan |
| 2023 | 15 | 2023 Rally de Portugal | Gravel | (Finland) Roope Korhonen | (Finland) Anssi Viinikka |
| 2023 | 16 | (Italy) 2023 Rally Italia Sardegna | Gravel | (Finland) Roope Korhonen | (Finland) Anssi Viinikka |
| 2023 | 17 | (Kenya) 2023 Safari Rally | Gravel | (Paraguay) Diego Domínguez Jr. | (Spain) Rogelio Peñate |
| 2023 | 18 | 2023 Rally Estonia | Gravel | (Finland) Roope Korhonen | (Finland) Anssi Viinikka |
| 2023 | 19 | 2023 Rally Finland | Gravel | (Finland) Benjamin Korhola | (Finland) Pekka Kelander |
| 2023 | 20 | (Greece) 2023 Acropolis Rally | Gravel | (Paraguay) Diego Domínguez Jr. | (Spain) Rogelio Peñate |
| 2023 | 21 | 2023 Rally Chile | Gravel | (Peru) Eduardo Castro | (Argentina) Fernando Mussano |
| 2023 | 22 | (Europe) 2023 Central European Rally | Tarmac | (Czech Republic) Filip Kohn | (United Kingdom) Tom Woodburn |
| 2023 | 23 | 2023 Rally Japan | Tarmac | (Canada) Jason Bailey | (Canada) Shayne Peterson |
| 2024 | 24 | (Monaco) 2024 Monte Carlo Rally | Mixed | (Czech Republic) Jan Černý | (Czech Republic) Ondřej Krajča |
| 2024 | 25 | 2024 Rally Sweden | Snow | (Sweden) Mille Johansson | (Sweden) Johan Grönvall |
| 2024 | 26 | (Kenya) 2024 Safari Rally | Gravel | (Kenya) Hamza Anwar | (Kenya) Adnan Din |
| 2024 | 27 | 2024 Croatia Rally | Tarmac | (Estonia) Romet Jürgenson | (Estonia) Siim Oja |
| 2024 | 28 | 2024 Rally de Portugal | Gravel | (Paraguay) Diego Domínguez Jr. | (Spain) Rogelio Peñate |
| 2024 | 29 | (Italy) 2024 Rally Italia Sardegna | Gravel | (Paraguay) Diego Domínguez Jr. | (Spain) Rogelio Peñate |
| 2024 | 30 | 2024 Rally Poland | Gravel | (Paraguay) Diego Domínguez Jr. | (Spain) Rogelio Peñate |
| 2024 | 31 | 2024 Rally Finland | Gravel | (Finland) Jesse Kallio | (Finland) Ville Pynnönen |
| 2024 | 32 | (Greece) 2024 Acropolis Rally | Gravel | (Romania) Norbert Maior | (Romania) Francesca Maior |
| 2024 | 33 | 2024 Rally Chile | Gravel | (Paraguay) Diego Domínguez Jr. | (Spain) Rogelio Peñate |
| 2025 | 34 | 2025 Rally Sweden | Snow | (Australia) Taylor Gill | (Australia) Daniel Brkic |
| 2025 | 35 | (Kenya) 2025 Safari Rally | Gravel | (Kenya) Nikhil Sachania | (Kenya) Deep Patel |
| 2025 | 36 | 2025 Rally de Portugal | Gravel | (Australia) Taylor Gill | (Australia) Daniel Brkic |
| 2025 | 37 | (Italy) 2025 Rally Italia Sardegna | Gravel | (Italy) Matteo Fontana | (Italy) Alessandro Arnaboldi |
| 2025 | 38 | (Greece) 2025 Acropolis Rally | Gravel | (Turkey) Ali Türkkan | (Turkey) Oytun Albayrak |
| 2025 | 39 | 2025 Rally Finland | Gravel | (Australia) Taylor Gill | (Australia) Daniel Brkic |
| 2025 | 40 | 2025 Rally del Paraguay | Gravel | (Italy) Matteo Fontana | (Italy) Alessandro Arnaboldi |
| 2025 | 41 | 2025 Rally Chile | Gravel | (Italy) Matteo Fontana | (Italy) Alessandro Arnaboldi |

=== Junior WRC ===
| Year | No. | Event | Surface | Driver | Co-driver |
|---|---|---|---|---|---|
| 2022 (Note: In 2022, instead of being its own separate championship, the Junior category of the WRC was a class of WRC3.) | 1 | 2022 Rally Sweden | Snow | (United Kingdom) Jon Armstrong | (Republic of Ireland) Brian Hoy |
| 2022 | 2 | 2022 Croatia Rally | Tarmac | (Finland) Lauri Joona | (Finland) Mikael Korhonen |
| 2022 | 3 | 2022 Rally de Portugal | Gravel | (Finland) Sami Pajari | (Finland) Enni Mälkönen |
| 2022 | 4 | 2022 Rally Estonia | Gravel | (Finland) Sami Pajari | (Finland) Enni Mälkönen |
| 2022 | 5 | (Greece) 2022 Acropolis Rally | Gravel | (Estonia) Robert Virves | (Sweden) Julia Thulin |
| 2023 | 6 | 2023 Rally Sweden | Snow | (Republic of Ireland) William Creighton | (Republic of Ireland) Liam Regan |
| 2023 | 7 | 2023 Croatia Rally | Tarmac | (Republic of Ireland) Eamonn Kelly | (Republic of Ireland) Conor Mohan |
| 2023 | 8 | (Italy) 2023 Rally Italia Sardegna | Gravel | (Republic of Ireland) William Creighton | (Republic of Ireland) Liam Regan |
| 2023 | 9 | 2023 Rally Estonia | Gravel | (Luxembourg) Grégoire Munster | (Belgium) Louis Louka |
| 2023 | 10 | (Greece) 2023 Acropolis Rally | Gravel | (Paraguay) Diego Domínguez Jr. | (Spain) Rogelio Peñate |
| 2024 | 11 | 2024 Rally Sweden | Snow | (Sweden) Mille Johansson | (Sweden) Johan Grönvall |
| 2024 | 12 | 2024 Croatia Rally | Tarmac | (Estonia) Romet Jürgenson | (Estonia) Siim Oja |
| 2024 | 13 | (Italy) 2024 Rally Italia Sardegna | Gravel | (Paraguay) Diego Domínguez Jr. | (Spain) Rogelio Peñate |
| 2024 | 14 | 2024 Rally Finland | Gravel | (Australia) Taylor Gill | (Australia) Daniel Brkic |
| 2024 | 15 | (Greece) 2024 Acropolis Rally | Gravel | (Romania) Norbert Maior | (Romania) Francesca Maior |
| 2025 | 16 | 2025 Rally Sweden | Snow | (Australia) Taylor Gill | (Australia) Daniel Brkic |
| 2025 | 17 | 2025 Rally de Portugal | Gravel | (Australia) Taylor Gill | (Australia) Daniel Brkic |
| 2025 | 18 | (Greece) 2025 Acropolis Rally | Gravel | (Turkey) Ali Türkkan | (Turkey) Oytun Albayrak |
| 2025 | 19 | 2025 Rally Finland | Gravel | (Republic of Ireland) Eamonn Kelly | (Republic of Ireland) Conor Mohan |

=== ERC Junior ===
| Year | No. | Event | Surface | Driver | Co-driver |
|---|---|---|---|---|---|
| 2021 | 1 | 2021 Rally Poland | Gravel | (United Kingdom) Jon Armstrong | (United Kingdom) Phil Hall |
| 2021 | 2 | (Latvia) 2021 Rally Liepāja | Gravel | (Estonia) Ken Torn | (Estonia) Kauri Pannas |
| 2021 | 3 | (Italy) 2021 Rally di Roma Capitale | Tarmac | (Estonia) Ken Torn | (Estonia) Timo Taniel |
| 2021 | 4 | (Czech Republic) 2021 Barum Czech Rally Zlín | Tarmac | (Estonia) Ken Torn | (Estonia) Kauri Pannas |
| 2021 | 5 | (Spain) 2021 Rally Islas Canarias | Tarmac | (Estonia) Ken Torn | (Estonia) Kauri Pannas |

=== ERC3 ===
| Year | No. | Event | Surface | Driver | Co-driver |
|---|---|---|---|---|---|
| 2022 | 1 | (Portugal) 2022 Rally Serras de Fafe e Felgueiras | Gravel | (Estonia) Kaspar Kasari | (Estonia) Rainis Raidma |
| 2022 | 2 | (Portugal) 2022 Azores Rallye | Gravel | (United Kingdom) Jon Armstrong | (Republic of Ireland) Brian Hoy |
| 2022 | 3 | (Italy) 2022 Rally Islas Canarias | Tarmac | (Poland) Igor Widłak | (Poland) Daniel Dymurski |
| 2022 | 4 | 2022 Rally Poland | Gravel | (Estonia) Robert Virves | (Sweden) Julia Thulin |
| 2022 | 5 | (Latvia) 2022 Rally Liepāja | Gravel | (Estonia) Kaspar Kasari | (Estonia) Rainis Raidma |
| 2022 | 6 | (Italy) 2022 Rally di Roma Capitale | Tarmac | (Estonia) Robert Virves | (Portugal) Hugo Magalhães |
| 2022 | 7 | (Czech Republic) 2022 Barum Czech Rally Zlín | Tarmac | (Poland) Igor Widłak | (Poland) Daniel Dymurski |
| 2023 | 8 | (Portugal) 2023 Rally Serras de Fafe e Felgueiras | Gravel | (United Kingdom) Jon Armstrong | (Republic of Ireland) Andrew Browne |
| 2023 | 9 | (Spain) 2023 Rally Islas Canarias | Tarmac | (United Kingdom) Jon Armstrong | (United Kingdom) Cameron Fair |
| 2023 | 10 | 2023 Rally Poland | Gravel | (United Kingdom) Jon Armstrong | (United Kingdom) Cameron Fair |
| 2023 | 11 | (Latvia) 2023 Rally Liepāja | Gravel | (United Kingdom) Jon Armstrong | (United Kingdom) Cameron Fair |
| 2023 | 12 | (Sweden) 2023 Royal Rally of Scandinavia | Gravel | (Republic of Ireland) William Creighton | (Republic of Ireland) Liam Regan |
| 2023 | 13 | (Italy) 2023 Rally di Roma Capitale | Tarmac | (United Kingdom) Jon Armstrong | (United Kingdom) Cameron Fair |
| 2023 | 14 | (Czech Republic) 2023 Barum Czech Rally Zlín | Tarmac | (Poland) Igor Widłak | (Poland) Mateusz Pawłowski |
| 2024 | 15 | 2024 Rally Hungary | Gravel | (Czech Republic) Filip Kohn | (United Kingdom) Tom Woodburn |
| 2024 | 16 | (Spain) 2024 Rally Islas Canarias | Tarmac | (Poland) Igor Widłak | (Poland) Daniel Dymurski |
| 2024 | 17 | (Sweden) 2024 Royal Rally of Scandinavia | Gravel | (Czech Republic) Filip Kohn | (United Kingdom) Tom Woodburn |
| 2024 | 18 | 2024 Rally Estonia | Gravel | (Estonia) Romet Jürgenson | (Estonia) Siim Oja |
| 2024 | 19 | (Italy) 2024 Rally di Roma Capitale | Tarmac | (Czech Republic) Filip Kohn | (United Kingdom) Tom Woodburn |
| 2024 | 20 | (Czech Republic) 2024 Barum Czech Rally Zlín | Tarmac | (Czech Republic) Filip Kohn | (United Kingdom) Tom Woodburn |
| 2024 | 21 | (United Kingdom) 2024 Rali Ceredigion | Tarmac | (Poland) Jakub Matulka | (Poland) Daniel Dymurski |
| 2024 | 22 | (Poland) 2024 Rally Silesia | Tarmac | (Sweden) Mille Johansson | (Sweden) Johan Grönvall |
| 2025 | 23 | (Spain) 2025 Rally Sierra Morena | Tarmac | (France) Tristan Charpentier | (France) Florian Barral |
| 2025 | 24 | 2025 Rally Hungary | Gravel | (Poland) Igor Widłak | (Poland) Daniel Dymurski |
| 2025 | 25 | (Sweden) 2025 Royal Rally of Scandinavia | Gravel | (Poland) Tymoteusz Abramowski | (Poland) Jakub Wróbel |
| 2025 | 26 | 2025 Rally Poland | Gravel | (Poland) Tymoteusz Abramowski | (Poland) Jakub Wróbel |
| 2025 | 27 | (Italy) 2025 Rally di Roma Capitale | Tarmac | (Poland) Tymoteusz Abramowski | (Poland) Jakub Wróbel |
| 2025 | 28 | (United Kingdom) 2025 Rali Ceredigion | Tarmac | (Republic of Ireland) Eamonn Kelly | (Republic of Ireland) Lorcan Moore |
