= Tristan Charpentier =

French racing driver

- Nationality: (France) French
- Born: 12 August 2000 (age 26) Béthune, France

Indy Pro 2000 Championship career
- Current team: Exclusive Autosport
- Car number: 90

Tristan Charpentier (born 12 August 2000) is a French race car driver from Béthune.

== Racing record ==
=== Career summary ===
| Season | Series | Team | Races | Wins | Poles | F/Laps | Podiums | Points | Position |
|---|---|---|---|---|---|---|---|---|---|
| 2015 | Ginetta Junior Championship | Tollbar Racing | 3 | 0 | 0 | 0 | 0 | –13 | 28th |
| 2016 | French F4 Championship | FFSA Academy | 23 | 1 | 0 | 1 | 6 | 204 | 5th |
| 2017 | BRDC British Formula 3 Championship | Chris Dittmann Racing | 5 | 0 | 0 | 0 | 0 | 53 | 18th |
| 2017 | SMP F4 Championship | MP Motorsport | 3 | 0 | 0 | 0 | 0 | 0 | 27th |
| 2018 | BRDC British Formula 3 Championship | Fortec Motorsports | 13 | 0 | 0 | 0 | 2 | 166 | 12th |
| 2019 | Super Formula | REAL Racing | 1 | 0 | 0 | 0 | 0 | 0 | 24th |
| 2020 | Indy Pro 2000 Championship | Exclusive Autosport | 2 | 0 | 0 | 0 | 0 | 20 | 21st |
| 2024 | World Rally Championship-3 | Tristan Charpentier | 3 | 0 | N/A | N/A | 0 | 22 | 18th |
| 2024 | European Rally Championship - ERC3 | Tristan Charpentier | 2 | 0 | N/A | N/A | 1 | 24 | 6th |
| 2025 | World Rally Championship-3 | Tristan Charpentier | 1 | 0 | N/A | N/A | 0 | 1 | 17th* |
| 2025 | European Rally Championship - ERC3 | Tristan Charpentier | 0 | 0 | N/A | N/A | 0 | 0 | NC* |
| 2026 | European Rally Championship | Orsák Rallysport | | | | | | | |
| 2026 | European Rally Championship | Equipe de France Espoir FFSA | | | | | | | |

* Season still in progress.

=== Complete Ginetta Junior Championship results ===
(key) (Races in bold indicate pole position) (Races in italics indicate fastest lap)

| Year | Team | 1 | 2 | 3 | 4 | 5 | 6 | 7 | 8 | 9 | 10 | 11 | 12 | 13 | 14 | 15 | 16 | 17 | 18 | 19 | 20 | Pos | Points |
|---|---|---|---|---|---|---|---|---|---|---|---|---|---|---|---|---|---|---|---|---|---|---|---|
| 2015 | Tollbar Racing | BHI; 1; 16 | BHI; 2; 22 | DON; 1 DSQ | DON; 2 DNS | THR; 1 | THR; 2 | OUL; 1 | OUL; 2 | CRO; 1 | CRO; 2 | SNE; 1 | SNE; 2 | KNO; 1 | KNO; 2 | ROC; 1 | ROC; 2 | SIL; 1 | SIL; 2 | BHGP; 1 | BHGP; 2 | 28th | 5 |

=== Complete French F4 Championship results ===
(key) (Races in bold indicate pole position) (Races in italics indicate fastest lap)

| Year | 1 | 2 | 3 | 4 | 5 | 6 | 7 | 8 | 9 | 10 | 11 | 12 | 13 | 14 | 15 | 16 | 17 | 18 | 19 | 20 | 21 | 22 | 23 | Pos | Points |
|---|---|---|---|---|---|---|---|---|---|---|---|---|---|---|---|---|---|---|---|---|---|---|---|---|---|
| 2016 | LEC; 1; 5 | LEC; 2; 9 | LEC; 3; 3 | LEC; 4; 3 | PAU; 1; 8 | PAU; 2 Ret | PAU; 3; 5 | PAU; 4; 7 | LÉD; 1; 9 | LÉD; 2; 3 | LÉD; 3; 14 | LÉD; 4; 7 | MAG; 1; 13 | MAG; 2; 9 | MAG; 3; 7 | MAG; 4; 7 | LMS; 1; 3 | LMS; 2; 4 | LMS; 3; 2 | LMS; 4; 1 | CAT; 1; 5 | CAT; 2; 5 | CAT; 3; 4 | 5th | 204 |

=== Complete SMP F4 Championship results ===
(key) (Races in bold indicate pole position) (Races in italics indicate fastest lap)

| Year | Team | 1 | 2 | 3 | 4 | 5 | 6 | 7 | 8 | 9 | 10 | 11 | 12 | 13 | 14 | 15 | 16 | 17 | 18 | 19 | 20 | 21 | Pos | Points |
|---|---|---|---|---|---|---|---|---|---|---|---|---|---|---|---|---|---|---|---|---|---|---|---|---|
| 2017 | MP Motorsport | SOC; 1; 16 | SOC; 2; 17 | SOC; 3 Ret | SMO; 1 | SMO; 2 | SMO; 3 | AHV; 1 WD | AHV; 2 WD | AHV; 3 WD | AUD; 1 | AUD; 2 | AUD; 3 | MSC1; 1 | MSC1; 2 | MSC1; 3 | MSC2; 1 | MSC2; 2 | MSC2; 3 | ASS; 1 | ASS; 2 | ASS; 3 | 27th | 0 |

=== Complete BRDC British Formula 3 Championship results ===
(key) (Races in bold indicate pole position) (Races in italics indicate fastest lap)

| Year | Team | 1 | 2 | 3 | 4 | 5 | 6 | 7 | 8 | 9 | 10 | 11 | 12 | 13 | 14 | 15 | 16 | 17 | 18 | 19 | 20 | 21 | 22 | 23 | 24 | Pos | Points |
|---|---|---|---|---|---|---|---|---|---|---|---|---|---|---|---|---|---|---|---|---|---|---|---|---|---|---|---|
| 2017 | Chris Dittmann Racing | OUL; 1; 10 | OUL; 2; 9 | OUL; 3 DNS | ROC; 1 | ROC; 2 | ROC; 3 | SNE; 1 | SNE; 2 | SNE; 3 | SIL; 1 | SIL; 2 | SIL; 3 | SPA; 1; 17 | SPA; 2; 8 | SPA; 3; 8 | BRH; 1 | BRH; 2 | BRH; 3 | SNE; 1 | SNE; 2 | SNE; 3 | DON; 1 | DON; 2 | DON; 3 | 18th | 53 |
| 2018 | Fortec Motorsports | OUL; 1; 16 | OUL; 2; 2 | OUL; 3; 6 | ROC; 1 DNS | ROC; 2; 12^{7} | ROC; 3 DNS | SNE; 1; 6 | SNE; 2; 10^{2} | SNE; 3; 4 | SIL; 1; 11 | SIL; 2; 5^{2} | SIL; 3; 9 | SPA; 1; 16 | SPA; 2; 3 | SPA; 3; 7 | BRH; 1 | BRH; 2 | BRH; 3 | DON; 1 | DON; 2 | DON; 3 | SIL; 1 | SIL; 2 | SIL; 3 | 12th | 166 |

=== Complete Super Formula results ===
(key) (Races in bold indicate pole position) (Races in italics indicate fastest lap)

| Year | Team | Engine | 1 | 2 | 3 | 4 | 5 | 6 | 7 | DC | Points |
|---|---|---|---|---|---|---|---|---|---|---|---|
| 2019 | REAL Racing | Honda | SUZ; Ret | AUT | SUG | FUJ | MOT | OKA | SUZ | 24th | 0 |

=== American open–wheel racing results ===
==== Indy Pro 2000 Championship ====
| Year | Team | 1 | 2 | 3 | 4 | 5 | 6 | 7 | 8 | 9 | 10 | 11 | 12 | 13 | 14 | 15 | 16 | 17 | Rank | Points |
|---|---|---|---|---|---|---|---|---|---|---|---|---|---|---|---|---|---|---|---|---|
| 2020 | Exclusive Autosport | ROA | ROA | MOH | MOH | MOH | LOR | GMP | IMS | IMS | IMS | MOH | MOH | NJM | NJM | NJM | STP; 11 | STP; 11 | 21st | 20 |

=== World Rally Championship results ===
| Year | Entrant | Car | 1 | 2 | 3 | 4 | 5 | 6 | 7 | 8 | 9 | 10 | 11 | 12 | 13 | 14 | Pos. | Points |
|---|---|---|---|---|---|---|---|---|---|---|---|---|---|---|---|---|---|---|
| 2024 | Tristan Charpentier | Ford Fiesta Rally3 | MON | SWE | KEN | CRO; 32 | POR; 27 | ITA | POL | LAT | FIN; WD | GRE | CHI | EUR; 24 | JPN | | NC | 0 |
| 2025 | Tristan Charpentier | Ford Fiesta Rally3 | MON | SWE; 38 | KEN | ESP | POR | ITA | GRE | EST | FIN | PAR | CHL | EUR | JPN | SAU | NC* | 0* |

* Season still in progress.
