= 2024 Rally Finland =

Motor rally competition

2024 Rally Finland Secto Rally Finland 2024
Round 9 of 13 in the 2024 World Rally Championship
← Previous event	Next event →
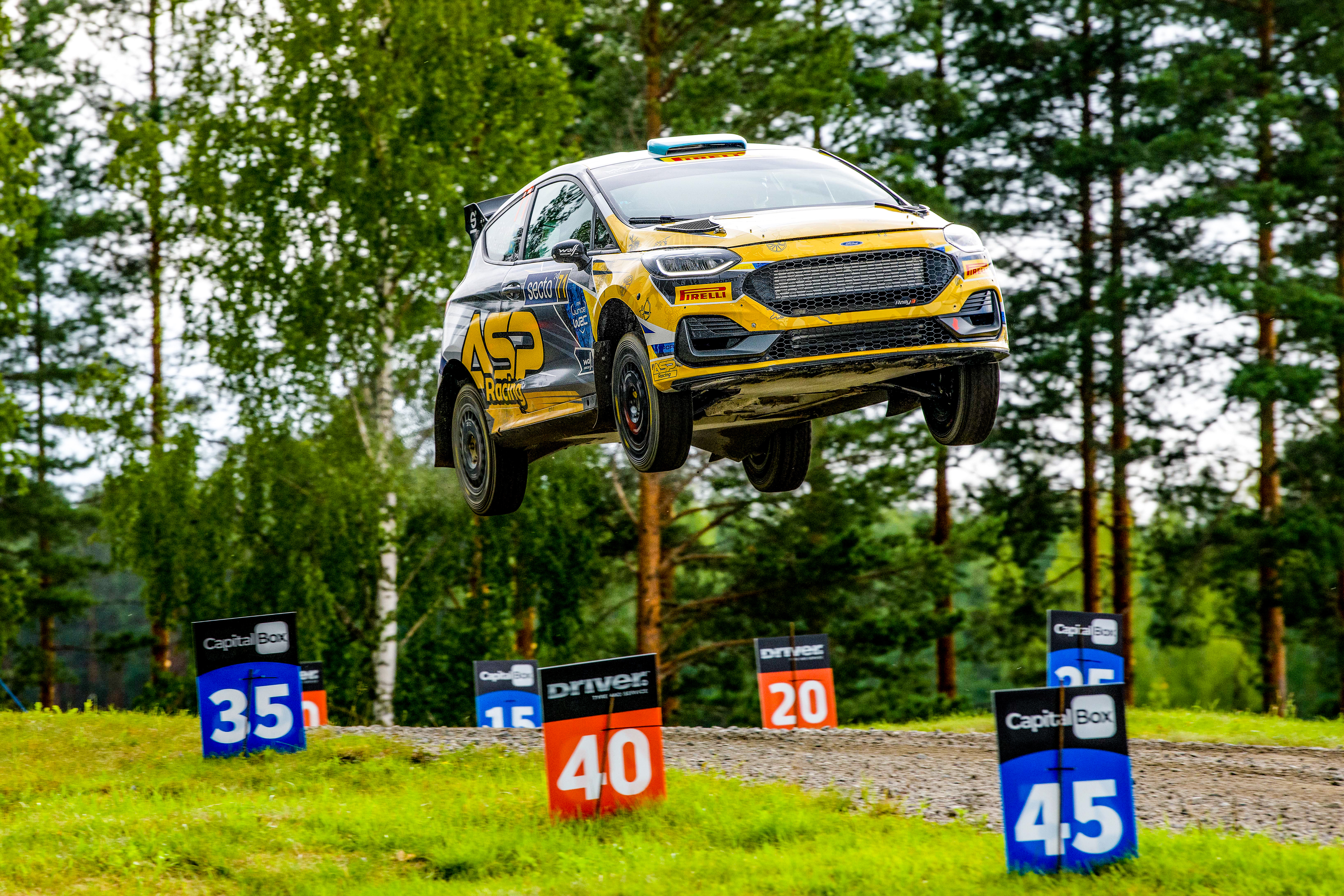
- Rally Finland has the fastest average speed of any event on the calendar.
- Host country: Finland
- Rally base: Jyväskylä, Central Finland
- Dates run: 1 – 4 August 2024
- Start location: Jyväskylä, Central Finland
- Finish location: Jyväskylä, Central Finland
- Stages: 20 (305.69 km; 189.95 miles)
- Stage surface: Gravel
- Transport distance: 1,066.87 km (662.92 miles)
- Overall distance: 1,372.56 km (852.87 miles)

Statistics
- Crews registered: 80
- Crews: 77 at start, 55 at finish

Overall results
- Overall winner: (France) Sébastien Ogier (France) Vincent Landais (Japan) Toyota Gazoo Racing WRT; 2:25:41.9
- Saturday Overall leader: (France) Sébastien Ogier (France) Vincent Landais (Japan) Toyota Gazoo Racing WRT; 2:04:38.0
- Sunday Accumulated leader: (Finland) Esapekka Lappi (Finland) Janne Ferm (South Korea) Hyundai Shell Mobis WRT; 21:02.4
- Power Stage winner: (Japan) Takamoto Katsuta (Republic of Ireland) Aaron Johnston (Japan) Toyota Gazoo Racing WRT; 5:12.5

Support category results
- WRC-2 winner: (Sweden) Oliver Solberg (United Kingdom) Elliott Edmondson (Germany) Toksport WRT; 2:33:57.4
- WRC-3 winner: (Finland) Jesse Kallio (Finland) Ville Pynnönen; 2:48:30.3
- J-WRC winner: (Australia) Taylor Gill (Australia) Daniel Brkic; FIA Rally Star; 2:49:07.5

The 2024 Rally Finland (also known as the Secto Rally Finland 2024) was a motor racing event for rally cars that was held over four days from 1 to 4 August 2024. It marked the seventy-third running of the Rally Finland, and was the ninth round of the 2024 World Rally Championship, World Rally Championship-2 and World Rally Championship-3. The event was also the fourth round of the 2024 Junior World Rally Championship. The 2024 event was based in Jyväskylä in Central Finland, and was contested over twenty special stages, covering a total competitive distance of 305.69 km (189.95 mi).

Elfyn Evans and Scott Martin were the defending rally winners. Their team, Toyota Gazoo Racing WRT, were the defending manufacturer's winners. Sami Pajari and Enni Mälkönen were the defending rally winners in the WRC-2 category, but they did not defend their titles as they debuted in the top tier. Benjamin Korhola and Pekka Kelander were the defending rally winners in the WRC-3 category.

Sébastien Ogier and Vincent Landais won the rally, and their team, Toyota, successfully defended their manufacturer's title. Oliver Solberg and Elliott Edmondson were the winners in the World Rally Championship-2 category. Jesse Kallio and Ville Pynnönen were the winners in the World Rally Championship-3 category. Taylor Gill and Daniel Brkic were the winners in the junior category.

== Background ==
=== Entry list ===
The following crews entered into the rally. The event was opened to crews competing in the World Rally Championship, its support categories, the World Rally Championship-2, World Rally Championship-3 as well as the Junior World Rally Championship, and privateer entries that were not registered to score points in any championship. Ten entered under Rally1 regulations, as were thirty-three Rally2 crews in the World Rally Championship-2 and twenty-two Rally3 crew in the World Rally Championship-3. A total of seventeen crews participated in the Junior World Rally Championship.

Rally1 entries competing in the World Rally Championship
No.	Driver	Co-Driver	Entrant	Car	Championship eligibility	Tyre
4	(Finland) Esapekka Lappi	(Finland) Janne Ferm	(South Korea) Hyundai Shell Mobis WRT	Hyundai i20 N Rally1	Driver, Co-driver, Manufacturer	P
5	(Finland) Sami Pajari	(Finland) Enni Mälkönen	(Japan) Toyota Gazoo Racing WRT	Toyota GR Yaris Rally1	Driver, Co-driver	P
8	(Estonia) Ott Tänak	(Estonia) Martin Järveoja	(South Korea) Hyundai Shell Mobis WRT	Hyundai i20 N Rally1	Driver, Co-driver, Manufacturer	P
11	(Belgium) Thierry Neuville	(Belgium) Martijn Wydaeghe	(South Korea) Hyundai Shell Mobis WRT	Hyundai i20 N Rally1	Driver, Co-driver, Manufacturer	P
13	(Luxembourg) Grégoire Munster	(Belgium) Louis Louka	(United Kingdom) M-Sport Ford WRT	Ford Puma Rally1	Driver, Co-driver, Manufacturer	P
16	(France) Adrien Fourmaux	(France) Alexandre Coria	(United Kingdom) M-Sport Ford WRT	Ford Puma Rally1	Driver, Co-driver, Manufacturer	P
17	(France) Sébastien Ogier	(France) Vincent Landais	(Japan) Toyota Gazoo Racing WRT	Toyota GR Yaris Rally1	Driver, Co-driver, Manufacturer	P
18	(Japan) Takamoto Katsuta	(Republic of Ireland) Aaron Johnston	(Japan) Toyota Gazoo Racing WRT	Toyota GR Yaris Rally1	Driver, Co-driver	P
33	(United Kingdom) Elfyn Evans	(United Kingdom) Scott Martin	(Japan) Toyota Gazoo Racing WRT	Toyota GR Yaris Rally1	Driver, Co-driver, Manufacturer	P
69	(Finland) Kalle Rovanperä	(Finland) Jonne Halttunen	(Japan) Toyota Gazoo Racing WRT	Toyota GR Yaris Rally1	Driver, Co-driver, Manufacturer	P

Rally2 entries competing in the World Rally Championship-2
No.	Driver	Co-Driver	Entrant	Car	Championship eligibility	Tyre
21	(Sweden) Oliver Solberg	(United Kingdom) Elliott Edmondson	(Germany) Toksport WRT	Škoda Fabia RS Rally2	Driver, Co-driver, Team	P
24	(Finland) Lauri Joona	(Finland) Janni Hussi	(Finland) Lauri Joona	Škoda Fabia RS Rally2	Challenger Driver, Challenger Co-driver	P
25	(Estonia) Georg Linnamäe	(United Kingdom) James Morgan	(Estonia) Georg Linnamäe	Toyota GR Yaris Rally2	Challenger Driver, Challenger Co-driver	P
26	(United Kingdom) Gus Greensmith	(Sweden) Jonas Andersson	(Germany) Toksport WRT	Škoda Fabia RS Rally2	Driver, Co-driver, Team	P
27	(Finland) Roope Korhonen	(Finland) Anssi Viinikka	(Finland) Roope Korhonen	Toyota GR Yaris Rally2	Challenger Driver, Challenger Co-driver	P
28	(Estonia) Robert Virves	(Estonia) Aleks Lesk	(Estonia) Robert Virves	Škoda Fabia RS Rally2	Challenger Driver, Challenger Co-driver	P
29	(Republic of Ireland) Josh McErlean	(Republic of Ireland) James Fulton	(Germany) Toksport WRT 2	Škoda Fabia RS Rally2	Challenger Driver, Challenger Co-driver, Team	P
30	(Czech Republic) Martin Prokop	(Czech Republic) Michal Ernst	(Czech Republic) Martin Prokop	Škoda Fabia RS Rally2	Challenger Driver, Challenger Co-driver	P
31	(Paraguay) Fabrizio Zaldivar	(Italy) Marcelo Der Ohannesian	(Paraguay) Fabrizio Zaldivar	Škoda Fabia RS Rally2	Challenger Driver, Challenger Co-driver	P
32	(Finland) Mikko Heikkilä	(Finland) Kristian Temonen	(Finland) Mikko Heikkilä	Toyota GR Yaris Rally2	Challenger Driver, Challenger Co-driver	P
34	(France) Pierre-Louis Loubet	(France) Loris Pascaud	(Germany) Toksport WRT 2	Škoda Fabia RS Rally2	Driver, Co-driver, Team	P
35	(Finland) Emil Lindholm	(Finland) Reeta Hämäläinen	(Finland) Emil Lindholm	Hyundai i20 N Rally2	Driver, Co-driver	P
36	(Italy) Mauro Miele	(Italy) Luca Beltrame	(Italy) Mauro Miele	Škoda Fabia RS Rally2	Challenger/Masters Driver, Challenger Co-driver	P
37	(Japan) Yuki Yamamoto	(Finland) Marko Salminen	(Japan) Toyota Gazoo Racing WRT NG	Toyota GR Yaris Rally2	Challenger Driver, Challenger Co-driver, Team	P
38	(Republic of Ireland) William Creighton	(Republic of Ireland) Liam Regan	(Republic of Ireland) Motorsport Ireland Rally Academy	Ford Fiesta Rally2	Challenger Driver, Challenger Co-driver	P
39	(Finland) Jari-Matti Latvala	(Finland) Juho Hänninen	(Japan) Toyota Gazoo Racing WRT	Toyota GR Yaris Rally2	Driver, Co-driver	P
40	(Finland) Teemu Suninen	(Finland) Mikko Markkula	(Finland) Teemu Suninen	Hyundai i20 N Rally2	Driver, Co-driver	P
41	(Finland) Teemu Asunmaa	(Finland) Ville Mannisenmäki	(Finland) Teemu Asunmaa	Škoda Fabia RS Rally2	Challenger/Masters Driver, Challenger Co-driver	P
43	(Finland) Benjamin Korhola	(Finland) Sebastian Virtanen	(Finland) Benjamin Korhola	Hyundai i20 N Rally2	Driver, Co-driver	P
44	(Japan) Hikaru Kogure	(Finland) Topi Matias Luhtinen	(Japan) Toyota Gazoo Racing WRT NG	Toyota GR Yaris Rally2	Challenger Driver, Challenger Co-driver, Team	P
45	(Estonia) Gregor Jeets	(Estonia) Timo Taniel	(Estonia) Gregor Jeets	Toyota GR Yaris Rally2	Challenger Driver, Challenger Co-driver	P
46	(Finland) Juhana Raitanen	(Finland) Samu Vaaleri	(Finland) Juhana Raitanen	Toyota GR Yaris Rally2	Challenger Driver, Challenger Co-driver	P
47	(Finland) Anssi Rytkönen	(Finland) Mikael Korhonen	(Finland) Anssi Rytkönen	Škoda Fabia R5	Challenger Driver, Challenger Co-driver	P
48	(Finland) Tuukka Kauppinen	(Finland) Veli-Pekka Karttunen	(Finland) Tuukka Kauppinen	Škoda Fabia RS Rally2	Challenger Driver, Challenger Co-driver	P
49	(Finland) Tommi Jylhä	(Finland) Kimmo Nevanpää	(Finland) Tommi Jylhä	Škoda Fabia R5	Challenger Driver, Challenger Co-driver	P
50	(Oman) Hamed Al-Wahaibi	(Austria) Ilka Minor	(Lebanon) HW34 by Motortune	Škoda Fabia RS Rally2	Challenger Driver, Challenger Co-driver	P
51	(France) Pierre Lafay	(France) Charlyne Quartini	(France) Pierre Lafay	Citroën C3 Rally2	Challenger/Masters Driver, Challenger Co-driver	P
52	(Mexico) Ricardo Triviño	(Spain) Diego Fuentes Vega	(Mexico) Ricardo Triviño	Škoda Fabia RS Rally2	Challenger/Masters Driver, Challenger Co-driver	P
53	(Turkey) Uğur Soylu	(Turkey) Sener Guray	(Turkey) Uğur Soylu	Škoda Fabia RS Rally2	Challenger/Masters Driver, Challenger Co-driver	P
54	(Finland) Juha Liimatainen	(Finland) Timo Hantunen	(Finland) Printsport	Škoda Fabia R5	Challenger/Masters Driver, Challenger/Masters Co-driver	P
55	(Italy) Maurizio Chiarani	(Italy) Flavio Zanella	(Italy) Maurizio Chiarani	Škoda Fabia Rally2 evo	Challenger/Masters Driver, Challenger/Masters Co-driver	P

Rally3 entries competing in the World Rally Championship-3 and/or the Junior World Rally Championship
No.	Driver	Co-Driver	Entrant	Car	Class eligibility	Tyre
56	(France) Mattéo Chatillon	(France) Maxence Cornuau	(France) Mattéo Chatillon	Renault Clio Rally3	WRC-3	P
57	(France) Tristan Charpentier	(France) Alexis Maillefert	(France) Tristan Charpentier	Ford Fiesta Rally3	WRC-3	P
58	(Poland) Grzegorz Bonder	(Poland) Paweł Pochroń	(Poland) Grzegorz Bonder	Ford Fiesta Rally3	WRC-3	P
59	(Finland) Henri Hokkala	(Finland) Kimmo Pahkala	(Finland) Henri Hokkala	Ford Fiesta Rally3	WRC-3	P
60	(Finland) Jesse Kallio	(Finland) Ville Pynnönen	(Finland) Jesse Kallio	Ford Fiesta Rally3	WRC-3	P
61	(Finland) Toni Herranen	(Finland) Juho-Ville Koskela	(Finland) Toni Herranen	Ford Fiesta Rally3	WRC-3	P
62	(Turkey) Kerem Kazaz	(France) Corentin Silvestre	(Turkey) Atölye Kazaz	Ford Fiesta Rally3	WRC-3	P
63	(Finland) Raoul Dahlqvist	(Finland) Patric Öhman	(Finland) Raoul Dahlqvist	Ford Fiesta Rally3	WRC-3	P
64	(Estonia) Romet Jürgenson	(Estonia) Siim Oja	FIA Rally Star	Ford Fiesta Rally3	WRC-3, Junior WRC	P
65	(Paraguay) Diego Dominguez Jr.	(Spain) Rogelio Peñate	(Paraguay) Diego Dominguez Jr.	Ford Fiesta Rally3	Junior WRC	P
66	(Australia) Taylor Gill	(Australia) Daniel Brkic	FIA Rally Star	Ford Fiesta Rally3	WRC-3, Junior WRC	P
67	(Romania) Norbert Maior	(Romania) Francesca Maria Maior	(Romania) Norbert Maior	Ford Fiesta Rally3	WRC-3, Junior WRC	P
68	(South Africa) Max Smart	(United Kingdom) Cameron Fair	FIA Rally Star	Ford Fiesta Rally3	WRC-3, Junior WRC	P
70	(Turkey) Ali Türkkan	(Turkey) Burak Erdener	(Turkey) Castrol Ford Team Türkiye	Ford Fiesta Rally3	WRC-3, Junior WRC	P
71	(Kazakhstan) Petr Borodin	(Kazakhstan) Roman Cheprasov	(Kazakhstan) ASP Racing	Ford Fiesta Rally3	WRC-3, Junior WRC	P
72	(Republic of Ireland) Eamonn Kelly	(Republic of Ireland) Conor Mohan	(Republic of Ireland) Motorsport Ireland Rally Academy	Ford Fiesta Rally3	WRC-3, Junior WRC	P
73	(Spain) Raúl Hernández	(Spain) José Murado González	(Spain) Raúl Hernández	Ford Fiesta Rally3	WRC-3, Junior WRC	P
74	(Chile) Gerardo V. Rosselot	(Argentina) Marcelo Brizio	(Chile) Gerardo V. Rosselot	Ford Fiesta Rally3	Junior WRC	P
75	(Belgium) Tom Rensonnet	(France) Manon Deliot	(Belgium) RACB National Team	Ford Fiesta Rally3	WRC-3, Junior WRC	P
76	(Peru) Jose Abito Caparo	(Spain) Esther Gutiérrez Porras	FIA Rally Star	Ford Fiesta Rally3	WRC-3, Junior WRC	P
77	(Bolivia) Nataniel Bruun	(Argentina) Pablo Olmos	(Bolivia) Nataniel Bruun	Ford Fiesta Rally3	WRC-3, Junior WRC	P
78	(Peru) Andre Martinez	(Argentina) Matías Aranguren	(Peru) Andre Martinez	Ford Fiesta Rally3	Junior WRC	P
79	(Germany) Fabio Schwarz	(Austria) Bernhard Ettel	(Germany) Armin Schwarz Driving Experience	Ford Fiesta Rally3	WRC-3, Junior WRC	P
80	(Finland) Leevi Lassila	(Finland) Antti Linnaketo	(Finland) Leevi Lassila	Ford Fiesta Rally3	WRC-3, Junior WRC	P
81	(Poland) Hubert Laskowski	(Poland) Michał Kuśnierz	(Poland) Hubert Laskowski	Ford Fiesta Rally3	WRC-3, Junior WRC	P

Other major entries
No.	Driver	Co-Driver	Entrant	Car	Tyre
20	(France) Yohan Rossel	(France) Florian Barral	(Belgium) DG Sport Compétition	Citroën C3 Rally2	P
22	(Bulgaria) Nikolay Gryazin	Konstantin Aleksandrov (Note: Konstantin Aleksandrov is Russian, but he competes as a neutral competitor using the ANA flag as Russian national emblems were banned by the association due to the Russian invasion of Ukraine.)	(Belgium) DG Sport Compétition	Citroën C3 Rally2	P
23	(Spain) Jan Solans	(Spain) Rodrigo Sanjuan de Eusebio	(Spain) Jan Solans	Toyota GR Yaris Rally2	P

=== Itinerary ===
All dates and times are EEST (UTC+3).

Date	No.	Time span	Stage name	Distance
31 July		After 19:00	Opening ceremony, Paviljonki	—N/a
1 August	—	After 10:01	Ruuhimäki [Shakedown]	4.12 km
1 August	SS1	After 19:05	Harju 1	3.48 km
1 August		19:40 – 19:55	Flexi service A, Paviljonki	—N/a
2 August	SS2	After 8:13	Laukaa 1	17.96 km
2 August	SS3	After 9:20	Saarikas 1	15.93 km
2 August	SS4	After 10:35	Myhinpää 1	15.51 km
2 August	SS5	After 12:05	Ruuhimäki 1	7.76 km
2 August		12:52 – 13:27	Regroup, Paviljonki	—N/a
2 August		13:27 – 14:07	Service B, Paviljonki	—N/a
2 August	SS6	After 15:10	Laukaa 2	17.96 km
2 August	SS7	After 16:17	Saarikas 2	15.93 km
2 August	SS8	After 17:32	Myhinpää 2	15.51 km
2 August	SS9	After 19:05	Ruuhimäki 2	7.76 km
2 August	SS10	After 20:05	Harju 2	2.01 km
2 August		20:40 – 21:25	Flexi service C, Paviljonki	—N/a
3 August	SS11	After 9:05	Västilä 1	18.94 km
3 August	SS12	After 10:05	Päijälä 1	20.19 km
3 August	SS13	After 11:05	Ouninpohja 1	32.98 km
3 August		12:50 – 13:10	Regroup, Paviljonki	—N/a
3 August		13:10 – 13:50	Service D, Paviljonki	—N/a
3 August	SS14	After 15:35	Västilä 2	18.94 km
3 August	SS15	After 16:35	Päijälä 2	20.19 km
3 August	SS16	After 17:35	Ouninpohja 2	32.98 km
3 August		19:30 – 20:15	Flexi service E, Jyväskylä Paviljonki	—N/a
4 August	SS17	After 8:55	Sahloinen-Moksi 1	14.27 km
4 August	SS18	After 10:05	Laajavuori 1	4.35 km
4 August	SS19	After 11:17	Sahloinen-Moksi 2	14.27 km
4 August	SS20	After 13:15	Laajavuori 2 [Power Stage]	8.77 km
4 August		After 15:00	Podium ceremony, Paviljonki	—N/a

== Report ==
=== WRC Rally1 ===
==== Classification ====
Position		No.	Driver	Co-driver	Entrant	Car	Time	Difference	Points			
Event	Class	No.	Driver	Co-driver	Entrant	Car	Time	Difference	SAT	SUN	WPS	Total
1	1	17	Sébastien Ogier	Vincent Landais	Toyota Gazoo Racing WRT	Toyota GR Yaris Rally1	2:25:41.9	0.0	18	5	1	24
2	2	11	Thierry Neuville	Martijn Wydaeghe	Hyundai Shell Mobis WRT	Hyundai i20 N Rally1	2:26:22.0	+40.1	15	4	4	23
3	3	16	Adrien Fourmaux	Alexandre Coria	M-Sport Ford WRT	Ford Puma Rally1	2:26:56.0	+1:14.1	13	3	2	18
4	4	5	Sami Pajari	Enni Mälkönen	Toyota Gazoo Racing WRT	Toyota GR Yaris Rally1	2:27:36.4	+1:54.5	10	2	0	14
41	5	18	Takamoto Katsuta	Aaron Johnston	Toyota Gazoo Racing WRT	Toyota GR Yaris Rally1	3:17:26.7	+51:44.8	0	6	5	11
43	6	4	Esapekka Lappi	Janne Ferm	Hyundai Shell Mobis WRT	Hyundai i20 N Rally1	3:20:39.8	+54:47.9	0	7	3	10
49	7	13	Grégoire Munster	Louis Louka	M-Sport Ford WRT	Ford Puma Rally1	3:27:34.0	+1:01:52.1	0	1	0	1
Retired SS19		33	Elfyn Evans	Scott Martin	Toyota Gazoo Racing WRT	Toyota GR Yaris Rally1	Accident		0	0	0	0
Retired SS19		69	Kalle Rovanperä	Jonne Halttunen	Toyota Gazoo Racing WRT	Toyota GR Yaris Rally1	Rolled		0	0	0	0
Retired SS3		8	Ott Tänak	Martin Järveoja	Hyundai Shell Mobis WRT	Hyundai i20 N Rally1	Rolled		0	0	0	0

==== Special stages ====
Stage	Winners	Car	Time	Class leaders
SD	Lappi / Ferm	Hyundai i20 N Rally1	2:15.4	—N/a
SS1	Neuville / Wydaeghe	Hyundai i20 N Rally1	2:46.1	Neuville / Wydaeghe
SS2	Evans / Martin	Toyota GR Yaris Rally1	8:35.4	Ogier / Landais
SS3	Rovanperä / Halttunen	Toyota GR Yaris Rally1	7:36.4	Rovanperä / Halttunen
SS4	Evans / Martin	Toyota GR Yaris Rally1	6:54.4	Evans / Martin
SS5	Rovanperä / Halttunen	Toyota GR Yaris Rally1	3:52.8	Rovanperä / Halttunen
SS6	Rovanperä / Halttunen	Toyota GR Yaris Rally1	8:26.9	Rovanperä / Halttunen
SS7	Rovanperä / Halttunen	Toyota GR Yaris Rally1	7:39.3	Rovanperä / Halttunen
SS8	Neuville / Wydaeghe	Hyundai i20 N Rally1	7:00.0	Rovanperä / Halttunen
SS9	Pajari / Mälkönen	Toyota GR Yaris Rally1	3:46.7	Rovanperä / Halttunen
SS10	Ogier / Landais	Toyota GR Yaris Rally1	1:36.7	Rovanperä / Halttunen
SS11	Rovanperä / Halttunen	Toyota GR Yaris Rally1	8:20.3	Rovanperä / Halttunen
SS12	Rovanperä / Halttunen	Toyota GR Yaris Rally1	9:37.5	Rovanperä / Halttunen
SS13	Rovanperä / Halttunen	Toyota GR Yaris Rally1	14:52.6	Rovanperä / Halttunen
SS14	Rovanperä / Halttunen	Toyota GR Yaris Rally1	8:18.9	Rovanperä / Halttunen
SS15	Lappi / Ferm	Hyundai i20 N Rally1	9:46.7	Rovanperä / Halttunen
SS16	Rovanperä / Halttunen	Toyota GR Yaris Rally1	14:32.6	Rovanperä / Halttunen
SS17	Rovanperä / Halttunen	Toyota GR Yaris Rally1	6:33.6	Rovanperä / Halttunen
SS18	Rovanperä / Halttunen	Toyota GR Yaris Rally1	2:40.4	Rovanperä / Halttunen
SS19	Katsuta / Johnston	Toyota GR Yaris Rally1	6:31.6	Ogier / Landais
SS20	Katsuta / Johnston	Toyota GR Yaris Rally1	5:12.5	Ogier / Landais

==== Championship standings ====
Pos.	Drivers' championships			Co-drivers' championships			Manufacturers' championships		
Pos.	Move	Driver	Points	Move	Co-driver	Points	Move	Manufacturer	Points
1		Thierry Neuville	168		Martijn Wydaeghe	168		Hyundai Shell Mobis WRT	395
2	2	Sébastien Ogier	141	2	Vincent Landais	141		Toyota Gazoo Racing WRT	375
3	1	Ott Tänak	137	1	Martin Järveoja	137		M-Sport Ford WRT	207
4	1	Elfyn Evans	132	1	Scott Martin	132			
5		Adrien Fourmaux	119		Alexandre Coria	119			

=== WRC-2 Rally2 ===
==== Classification ====
Position		No.	Driver	Co-driver	Entrant	Car	Time	Difference	Points	
Event	Class	No.	Driver	Co-driver	Entrant	Car	Time	Difference	Class	Event
5	1	21	Oliver Solberg	Elliott Edmondson	Toksport WRT	Škoda Fabia RS Rally2	2:33:57.4	0.0	25	8
6	2	39	Jari-Matti Latvala	Juho Hänninen	Toyota Gazoo Racing WRT	Toyota GR Yaris Rally2	2:34:36.4	+39.0	18	6
7	3	24	Lauri Joona	Janni Hussi	Lauri Joona	Škoda Fabia RS Rally2	2:35:11.3	+1:13.9	15	4
8	4	32	Mikko Heikkilä	Kristian Temonen	Mikko Heikkilä	Toyota GR Yaris Rally2	2:35:13.9	+1:16.5	12	2
10	5	25	Georg Linnamäe	James Morgan	Georg Linnamäe	Toyota GR Yaris Rally2	2:35:48.9	+1:51.5	10	1
11	6	27	Roope Korhonen	Anssi Viinikka	Roope Korhonen	Toyota GR Yaris Rally2	2:36:29.4	+2:32.0	8	0
12	7	29	Josh McErlean	James Fulton	Toksport WRT 2	Škoda Fabia RS Rally2	2:37:13.2	+3:15.8	6	0
14	8	28	Robert Virves	Aleks Lesk	Robert Virves	Škoda Fabia RS Rally2	2:38:35.7	+4:38.3	4	0
16	9	41	Teemu Asunmaa	Ville Mannisenmäki	Teemu Asunmaa	Škoda Fabia RS Rally2	2:38:55.9	+4:58.5	2	0
17	10	43	Benjamin Korhola	Sebastian Virtanen	Benjamin Korhola	Hyundai i20 N Rally2	2:39:00.0	+5:02.6	1	0
18	11	30	Martin Prokop	Michal Ernst	Martin Prokop	Škoda Fabia RS Rally2	2:39:55.7	+5:58.3	0	0
19	12	46	Juhana Raitanen	Samu Vaaleri	Juhana Raitanen	Toyota GR Yaris Rally2	2:40:17.9	+6:20.5	0	0
20	13	48	Tuukka Kauppinen	Veli-Pekka Karttunen	Tuukka Kauppinen	Škoda Fabia RS Rally2	2:41:30.1	+7:32.7	0	0
26	14	49	Tommi Jylhä	Kimmo Nevanpää	Tommi Jylhä	Škoda Fabia R5	2:51:09.1	+17:11.7	0	0
32	15	52	Ricardo Triviño	Diego Fuentes Vega	Ricardo Triviño	Škoda Fabia RS Rally2	2:59:20.6	+25:32.3	0	0
34	16	53	Uğur Soylu	Sener Guray	Uğur Soylu	Škoda Fabia RS Rally2	3:01:18.0	+27:20.6	0	0
42	17	55	Maurizio Chiarani	Flavio Zanella	Maurizio Chiarani	Škoda Fabia Rally2 evo	3:18:14.7	+44:17.3	0	0
46	18	38	William Creighton	Liam Regan	Motorsport Ireland Rally Academy	Ford Fiesta Rally2	3:24:36.4	+50:39.0	0	0
50	19	31	Fabrizio Zaldivar	Marcelo Der Ohannesian	Fabrizio Zaldivar	Škoda Fabia RS Rally2	3:27:39.0	+53:41.6	0	0
55	20	35	Emil Lindholm	Reeta Hämäläinen	Emil Lindholm	Hyundai i20 N Rally2	3:44:49.6	+1:10:52.2	0	0
Retired SS18		47	Anssi Rytkönen	Mikael Korhonen	Anssi Rytkönen	Škoda Fabia R5	Mechanical		0	0
Retired SS14		26	Gus Greensmith	Jonas Andersson	Toksport WRT	Škoda Fabia RS Rally2	Mechanical		0	0
Retired SS14		36	Mauro Miele	Luca Beltrame	Mauro Miele	Škoda Fabia RS Rally2	Mechanical		0	0
Retired SS14		40	Teemu Suninen	Mikko Markkula	Teemu Suninen	Hyundai i20 N Rally2	Power steering		0	0
Retired SS11		54	Juha Liimatainen	Timo Hantunen	Printsport	Škoda Fabia R5	Accident		0	0
Retired SS7		44	Hikaru Kogure	Topi Matias Luhtinen	Toyota Gazoo Racing WRT NG	Toyota GR Yaris Rally2	Accident		0	0
Retired SS5		34	Pierre-Louis Loubet	Loris Pascaud	Toksport WRT 2	Škoda Fabia RS Rally2	Accident		0	0
Retired SS4		50	Hamed Al-Wahaibi	Ilka Minor	HW34 by Motortune	Škoda Fabia RS Rally2	Accident		0	0
Retired SS4		51	Pierre Lafay	Charlyne Quartini	Pierre Lafay	Citroën C3 Rally2	Accident		0	0
Did not start		45	Gregor Jeets	Timo Taniel	Gregor Jeets	Toyota GR Yaris Rally2	Injury		0	0

==== Special stages ====
Overall
Stage	Winners	Car	Time	Class leaders
SD	Solberg / Edmondson	Škoda Fabia RS Rally2	2:23.1	—N/a
SS1	Solberg / Edmondson	Škoda Fabia RS Rally2	2:55.9	Solberg / Edmondson
SS2	Virves / Lesk	Škoda Fabia RS Rally2	9:04.1	Solberg / Edmondson
SS3	Solberg / Edmondson	Škoda Fabia RS Rally2	8:02.4	Solberg / Edmondson
SS4	Latvala / Hänninen	Toyota GR Yaris Rally2	7:24.3	Solberg / Edmondson
SS5	Virves / Lesk	Škoda Fabia RS Rally2	4:07.1	Solberg / Edmondson
SS6	Solberg / Edmondson	Škoda Fabia RS Rally2	8:53.7	Solberg / Edmondson
SS7	Solberg / Edmondson	Škoda Fabia RS Rally2	8:03.2	Solberg / Edmondson
SS8	Latvala / Hänninen	Toyota GR Yaris Rally2	7:26.4	Solberg / Edmondson
SS9	Solberg / Edmondson	Škoda Fabia RS Rally2	4:02.5	Solberg / Edmondson
SS10	Solberg / Edmondson	Škoda Fabia RS Rally2	1:42.8	Solberg / Edmondson
SS11	Heikkilä / Temonen	Toyota GR Yaris Rally2	8:51.4	Solberg / Edmondson
SS12	Latvala / Hänninen	Toyota GR Yaris Rally2	10:15.6	Solberg / Edmondson
SS13	Linnamäe / Morgan	Toyota GR Yaris Rally2	15:43.3	Solberg / Edmondson
SS14	Solberg / Edmondson	Škoda Fabia RS Rally2	8:51.2	Solberg / Edmondson
SS15	Virves / Lesk	Škoda Fabia RS Rally2	10:18.5	Solberg / Edmondson
SS16	Solberg / Edmondson	Škoda Fabia RS Rally2	15:25.9	Solberg / Edmondson
SS17	Latvala / Hänninen	Toyota GR Yaris Rally2	6:59.6	Solberg / Edmondson
SS18	Heikkilä / Temonen	Toyota GR Yaris Rally2	2:47.4	Solberg / Edmondson
SS19	Heikkilä / Temonen	Toyota GR Yaris Rally2	6:55.9	Solberg / Edmondson
SS20	Heikkilä / Temonen	Toyota GR Yaris Rally2	5:28.3	Solberg / Edmondson

Challenger
Stage	Winners	Car	Time	Class leaders
SD	Kauppinen / Karttunen	Škoda Fabia RS Rally2	2:24.8	—N/a
SS1	Linnamäe / Morgan	Toyota GR Yaris Rally2	2:57.0	Linnamäe / Morgan
SS2	Virves / Lesk	Škoda Fabia RS Rally2	9:04.1	Linnamäe / Morgan
SS3	Stage cancelled			
SS4	Virves / Lesk	Škoda Fabia RS Rally2	7:25.4	Virves / Lesk
SS5	Virves / Lesk	Škoda Fabia RS Rally2	4:07.1	Virves / Lesk
SS6	Heikkilä / Temonen	Toyota GR Yaris Rally2	9:03.7	Virves / Lesk
SS7	Korhonen / Viinikka	Toyota GR Yaris Rally2	8:07.6	Virves / Lesk
SS7	Virves / Lesk	Škoda Fabia RS Rally2	8:07.6	Virves / Lesk
SS8	Virves / Lesk	Škoda Fabia RS Rally2	7:27.0	Virves / Lesk
SS9	Virves / Lesk	Škoda Fabia RS Rally2	4:03.8	Virves / Lesk
SS10	Yamamoto / Salminen	Toyota GR Yaris Rally2	1:43.1	Virves / Lesk
SS11	Heikkilä / Temonen	Toyota GR Yaris Rally2	8:51.4	Virves / Lesk
SS12	Heikkilä / Temonen	Toyota GR Yaris Rally2	10:20.4	Heikkilä / Temonen
SS13	Linnamäe / Morgan	Toyota GR Yaris Rally2	15:43.3	Virves / Lesk
SS14	Heikkilä / Temonen	Toyota GR Yaris Rally2	8:58.2	Virves / Lesk
SS15	Virves / Lesk	Škoda Fabia RS Rally2	10:18.5	Virves / Lesk
SS16	Linnamäe / Morgan	Toyota GR Yaris Rally2	15:30.1	Joona / Hussi
SS17	Virves / Lesk	Škoda Fabia RS Rally2	7:00.5	Joona / Hussi
SS18	Heikkilä / Temonen	Toyota GR Yaris Rally2	2:47.4	Joona / Hussi
SS19	Heikkilä / Temonen	Toyota GR Yaris Rally2	6:55.9	Joona / Hussi
SS20	Heikkilä / Temonen	Toyota GR Yaris Rally2	5:28.3	Joona / Hussi

==== Championship standings ====
Pos.	Open Drivers' championships			Open Co-drivers' championships			Teams' championships			Challenger Drivers' championships			Challenger Co-drivers' championships		
Pos.	Move	Driver	Points	Move	Co-driver	Points	Move	Manufacturer	Points	Move	Manufacturer	Points	Move	Driver	Points
1		Oliver Solberg	111		Elliott Edmondson	111	1	Toksport WRT	178		Sami Pajari	93		Enni Mälkönen	93
2		Sami Pajari	83	1	Enni Mälkönen	83	1	DG Sport Compétition	169	2	Lauri Joona	78	2	Janni Hussi	78
3	2	Yohan Rossel	71	3	Janni Hussi	58		Toyota Gazoo Racing WRT NG	73	1	Jan Solans	56	1	Rodrigo Sanjuan de Eusebio	56
4	2	Lauri Joona	58	1	Arnaud Dunand	53		Toksport WRT 2	54	1	Nikolay Gryazin	55	1	Konstantin Aleksandrov	55
5	1	Jan Solans	48	1	Rodrigo Sanjuan de Eusebio	48				5	Mikko Heikkilä	55	5	Kristian Temonen	55

=== WRC-3 Rally3 ===
==== Classification ====
Position		No.	Driver	Co-driver	Entrant	Car	Time	Difference	Points
Event	Class	No.	Driver	Co-driver	Entrant	Car	Time	Difference	Points
21	1	60	Jesse Kallio	Ville Pynnönen	Jesse Kallio	Ford Fiesta Rally3	2:48:30.3	0.0	25
22	2	66	Taylor Gill	Daniel Brkic	FIA Rally Star	Ford Fiesta Rally3	2:49:07.5	+37.2	18
23	3	70	Ali Türkkan	Burak Erdener	Castrol Ford Team Türkiye	Ford Fiesta Rally3	2:49:09.6	+39.3	15
24	4	75	Tom Rensonnet	Manon Deliot	RACB National Team	Ford Fiesta Rally3	2:50:40.6	+2:10.3	12
25	5	71	Petr Borodin	Roman Cheprasov	ASP Racing	Ford Fiesta Rally3	2:51:07.6	+2:37.3	10
27	6	79	Fabio Schwarz	Bernhard Ettel	Armin Schwarz Driving Experience	Ford Fiesta Rally3	2:51:14.8	+2:44.5	8
28	7	72	Eamonn Kelly	Conor Mohan	Motorsport Ireland Rally Academy	Ford Fiesta Rally3	2:51:43.8	+3:13.5	6
30	8	77	Nataniel Bruun	Pablo Olmos	Nataniel Bruun	Ford Fiesta Rally3	2:55:19.5	+6:49.2	4
31	9	76	Jose Abito Caparo	Esther Gutiérrez Porras	FIA Rally Star	Ford Fiesta Rally3	2:58:55.7	+10:25.4	2
35	10	62	Kerem Kazaz	Corentin Silvestre	Atölye Kazaz	Ford Fiesta Rally3	3:03:38.7	+15:08.4	1
39	11	58	Grzegorz Bonder	Paweł Pochroń	Grzegorz Bonder	Ford Fiesta Rally3	3:07:48.9	+19:18.6	0
44	12	68	Max Smart	Cameron Fair	FIA Rally Star	Ford Fiesta Rally3	3:23:46.4	+35:16.1	0
52	13	64	Romet Jürgenson	Siim Oja	FIA Rally Star	Ford Fiesta Rally3	3:36:03.1	+47:32.8	0
54	14	80	Leevi Lassila	Antti Linnaketo	Leevi Lassila	Ford Fiesta Rally3	3:39:08.7	+50:38.4	0
Retired SS14		56	Mattéo Chatillon	Maxence Cornuau	Mattéo Chatillon	Renault Clio Rally3	Rolled		0
Retired SS14		61	Toni Herranen	Juho-Ville Koskela	Toni Herranen	Ford Fiesta Rally3	Mechanical		0
Retired SS13		67	Norbert Maior	Francesca Maria Maior	Norbert Maior	Ford Fiesta Rally3	Accident		0
Retired SS6		59	Henri Hokkala	Kimmo Pahkala	Henri Hokkala	Ford Fiesta Rally3	Accident		0
Retired SS2		63	Raoul Dahlqvist	Patric Öhman	Raoul Dahlqvist	Ford Fiesta Rally3	Accident		0
Disqualified SS17		81	Hubert Laskowski	Michał Kuśnierz	Hubert Laskowski	Ford Fiesta Rally3	Driving on puncture		0

==== Special stages ====
Stage	Winners	Car	Time	Class leaders
SD	Chatillon / Cornuau	Renault Clio Rally3	2:32.6	—N/a
SS1	Chatillon / Cornuau	Renault Clio Rally3	3:06.8	Chatillon / Cornuau
SS1	Jürgenson / Oja	Ford Fiesta Rally3	3:06.8	Jürgenson / Oja
SS2	Hokkala / Pahkala	Ford Fiesta Rally3	9:34.7	Hokkala / Pahkala
SS3	Stage cancelled			
SS4	Hokkala / Pahkala	Ford Fiesta Rally3	7:54.6	Hokkala / Pahkala
SS5	Hokkala / Pahkala	Ford Fiesta Rally3	4:21.0	Hokkala / Pahkala
SS6	Kazaz / Silvestre	Ford Fiesta Rally3	9:50.0	Gill / Brkic
SS7	Chatillon / Cornuau	Renault Clio Rally3	8:59.2	Borodin / Cheprasov
SS7	Borodin / Cheprasov	Ford Fiesta Rally3	8:59.2	Borodin / Cheprasov
SS8	Türkkan / Erdener	Ford Fiesta Rally3	8:00.6	Borodin / Cheprasov
SS9	Kazaz / Silvestre	Ford Fiesta Rally3	4:26.1	Borodin / Cheprasov
SS10	Borodin / Cheprasov	Ford Fiesta Rally3	1:49.5	Borodin / Cheprasov
SS11	Gill / Brkic	Ford Fiesta Rally3	9:24.2	Borodin / Cheprasov
SS12	Jürgenson / Oja	Ford Fiesta Rally3	10:53.8	Türkkan / Erdener
SS13	Kallio / Pynnönen	Ford Fiesta Rally3	16:39.0	Kallio / Pynnönen
SS14	Jürgenson / Oja	Ford Fiesta Rally3	9:28.9	Kallio / Pynnönen
SS15	Kallio / Pynnönen	Ford Fiesta Rally3	11:13.4	Kallio / Pynnönen
SS16	Jürgenson / Oja	Ford Fiesta Rally3	16:53.3	Kallio / Pynnönen
SS17	Jürgenson / Oja	Ford Fiesta Rally3	7:24.6	Kallio / Pynnönen
SS18	Türkkan / Erdener	Ford Fiesta Rally3	2:56.5	Kallio / Pynnönen
SS19	Jürgenson / Oja	Ford Fiesta Rally3	7:20.3	Kallio / Pynnönen
SS20	Jürgenson / Oja	Ford Fiesta Rally3	5:50.5	Kallio / Pynnönen

==== Championship standings ====
Pos.	Drivers' championships			Co-drivers' championships		
Pos.	Move	Driver	Points	Move	Co-driver	Points
1		Diego Dominguez Jr.	75		Rogelio Peñate	75
2		Mattéo Chatillon	48		Maxence Cornuau	48
3		Jan Černý	47		Ondřej Krajča	47
4	2	Taylor Gill	44	2	Daniel Brkic	44
5	1	Romet Jürgenson	43	1	Siim Oja	43

=== J-WRC Rally3 ===
==== Classification ====
Position		No.	Driver	Co-driver	Entrant	Car	Time	Difference	Points	
Event	Class	No.	Driver	Co-driver	Entrant	Car	Time	Difference	Class	Stage
22	1	66	Taylor Gill	Daniel Brkic	FIA Rally Star	Ford Fiesta Rally3	2:49:07.5	0.0	25	2
23	2	70	Ali Türkkan	Burak Erdener	Castrol Ford Team Türkiye	Ford Fiesta Rally3	2:49:09.6	+2.1	18	3
24	3	75	Tom Rensonnet	Manon Deliot	RACB National Team	Ford Fiesta Rally3	2:50:40.6	+1:33.1	15	0
25	4	71	Petr Borodin	Roman Cheprasov	ASP Racing	Ford Fiesta Rally3	2:51:07.6	+2:37.3	12	3
27	5	79	Fabio Schwarz	Bernhard Ettel	Armin Schwarz Driving Experience	Ford Fiesta Rally3	2:51:14.8	+2:07.3	10	0
28	6	72	Eamonn Kelly	Conor Mohan	Motorsport Ireland Rally Academy	Ford Fiesta Rally3	2:51:43.8	+2:36.3	8	0
29	7	65	Diego Dominguez Jr.	Rogelio Peñate	Diego Dominguez Jr.	Ford Fiesta Rally3	2:51:48.4	+2:40.9	6	0
30	8	77	Nataniel Bruun	Pablo Olmos	Nataniel Bruun	Ford Fiesta Rally3	2:55:19.5	+6:12.0	4	0
31	9	76	Jose Abito Caparo	Esther Gutiérrez Porras	FIA Rally Star	Ford Fiesta Rally3	2:58:55.7	+9:48.2	2	0
38	10	78	Andre Martinez	Matías Aranguren	Andre Martinez	Ford Fiesta Rally3	3:07:40.2	+18:32.7	1	0
44	11	68	Max Smart	Cameron Fair	FIA Rally Star	Ford Fiesta Rally3	+34:38.9	+35:16.1	0	0
52	12	64	Romet Jürgenson	Siim Oja	FIA Rally Star	Ford Fiesta Rally3	3:36:03.1	+46:55.6	0	9
54	13	80	Leevi Lassila	Antti Linnaketo	Leevi Lassila	Ford Fiesta Rally3	3:39:08.7	+50:01.2	0	0
Retired SS14		74	Gerardo V. Rosselot	Marcelo Brizio	Gerardo V. Rosselot	Ford Fiesta Rally3	Accident		0	0
Retired SS13		67	Norbert Maior	Francesca Maria Maior	Norbert Maior	Ford Fiesta Rally3	Accident		0	0
Disqualified SS17		81	Hubert Laskowski	Michał Kuśnierz	Hubert Laskowski	Ford Fiesta Rally3	Driving on puncture		0	0

==== Special stages ====
Stage	Winners	Car	Time	Class leaders
SD	Türkkan / Erdener	Ford Fiesta Rally3	2:33.6	—N/a
SS1	Jürgenson / Oja	Ford Fiesta Rally3	3:06.8	Jürgenson / Oja
SS2	Stage cancelled			
SS3	Stage cancelled			
SS4	Jürgenson / Oja	Ford Fiesta Rally3	8:03.9	Jürgenson / Oja
SS5	Jürgenson / Oja	Ford Fiesta Rally3	4:22.2	Jürgenson / Oja
SS6	Borodin / Cheprasov	Ford Fiesta Rally3	9:55.6	Gill / Brkic
SS7	Borodin / Cheprasov	Ford Fiesta Rally3	8:59.2	Borodin / Cheprasov
SS8	Türkkan / Erdener	Ford Fiesta Rally3	8:00.6	Borodin / Cheprasov
SS9	Türkkan / Erdener	Ford Fiesta Rally3	4:26.5	Borodin / Cheprasov
SS10	Borodin / Cheprasov	Ford Fiesta Rally3	1:49.5	Borodin / Cheprasov
SS11	Gill / Brkic	Ford Fiesta Rally3	9:24.2	Borodin / Cheprasov
SS12	Jürgenson / Oja	Ford Fiesta Rally3	10:53.8	Türkkan / Erdener
SS13	Jürgenson / Oja	Ford Fiesta Rally3	16:39.0	Borodin / Cheprasov
SS14	Jürgenson / Oja	Ford Fiesta Rally3	9:28.9	Borodin / Cheprasov
SS15	Gill / Brkic	Ford Fiesta Rally3	11:20.5	Türkkan / Erdener
SS16	Jürgenson / Oja	Ford Fiesta Rally3	16:53.3	Gill / Brkic
SS17	Jürgenson / Oja	Ford Fiesta Rally3	7:24.6	Gill / Brkic
SS18	Türkkan / Erdener	Ford Fiesta Rally3	2:56.5	Gill / Brkic
SS19	Jürgenson / Oja	Ford Fiesta Rally3	7:20.3	Gill / Brkic
SS20	Jürgenson / Oja	Ford Fiesta Rally3	5:50.5	Gill / Brkic

==== Championship standings ====
Pos.	Drivers' championships			Co-drivers' championships		
Pos.	Move	Driver	Points	Move	Co-driver	Points
1		Romet Jürgenson	69		Siim Oja	69
2	1	Taylor Gill	61	1	Daniel Brkic	61
3	1	Diego Dominguez Jr.	41	1	Rogelio Peñate	41
4	3	Ali Türkkan	41	3	Burak Erdener	41
5	1	Mille Johansson	33	1	Johan Grönvall	33

== Notes ==
Previous rally: 2024 Rally Latvia	2024 FIA World Rally Championship	Next rally: 2024 Acropolis Rally
Previous rally: 2023 Rally Finland	2024 Rally Finland	Next rally: 2025 Rally Finland
