= 2025 Rally de Portugal =

58th edition of the Rally de Portugal

2025 Rally de Portugal Vodafone Rally de Portugal 2025
Round 5 of 14 in the 2025 World Rally Championship
← Previous event	Next event →
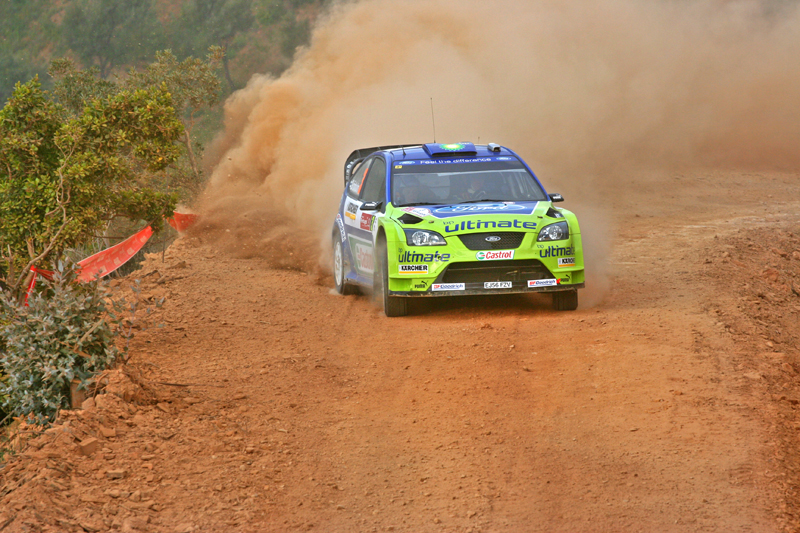
- Rocks and deep ruts were the features of the Rally de Portugal.
- Host country: Portugal
- Rally base: Matosinhos, Porto
- Dates run: 15 – 18 May 2025
- Start location: Figueira da Foz, Central Region
- Finish location: Fafe, Braga
- Stages: 24 (344.50 km; 214.06 miles)
- Stage surface: Gravel
- Transport distance: 1,446.15 km (898.60 miles)
- Overall distance: 1,790.65 km (1,112.66 miles)

Statistics
- Crews registered: 95
- Crews: 89 at start, 66 at finish

Overall results
- Overall winner: (France) Sébastien Ogier (France) Vincent Landais (Japan) Toyota Gazoo Racing WRT; 3:48:35.9
- Sunday Accumulated leader: (Estonia) Ott Tänak (Estonia) Martin Järveoja (South Korea) Hyundai Shell Mobis WRT; 47:03.8
- Power Stage winner: (Estonia) Ott Tänak (Estonia) Martin Järveoja (South Korea) Hyundai Shell Mobis WRT; 6:22.7

Support category results
- WRC-2 winner: (Sweden) Oliver Solberg (United Kingdom) Elliott Edmondson (Finland) Printsport; 3:57:51.0
- WRC-3 winner: (Australia) Taylor Gill (Australia) Daniel Brkic; FIA Rally Star; 4:15:07.3
- J-WRC winner: (Australia) Taylor Gill (Australia) Daniel Brkic; FIA Rally Star; 4:15:07.3

The 2025 Rally de Portugal (also known as the Vodafone Rally de Portugal 2025) was a motor racing event for rally cars that was held over four days from 15 to 18 May 2025. It marked the fifty-eighth running of the Rally de Portugal, and was the fifth round of the 2025 World Rally Championship, 2025 WRC2 Championship and 2025 WRC3 Championship. The event was also second round of the 2025 Junior WRC Championship. The 2025 event was based in Matosinhos in the Porto District and was contested over twenty-four special stages, covering a total competitive distance of 344.50 km (214.06 mi).

Sébastien Ogier and Vincent Landais were the defending rally winners. Their team, Toyota Gazoo Racing WRT, were the defending manufacturer's winners. Jan Solans and Rodrigo Sanjuan de Eusebio were the defending rally winners in the WRC2 category. Diego Dominguez Jr. and Rogelio Peñate were the defending rally winners in the WRC3 category.

Ogier and Landais, and their team, Toyota Gazoo Racing WRT, successfully defended their titles. Oliver Solberg and Elliott Edmondson were the winners in the WRC2 category. Taylor Gill and Daniel Brkic were the winners in the WRC3 category, as well as the junior class.

== Background ==
=== Entry list ===
The following crews were entered into the rally. The event was opened to crews competing in the World Rally Championship, its support categories, the WRC2 Championship, the WRC3 Championship and privateer entries that are not registered to score points in any championship. Twelve were entered under Rally1 regulations, as were forty-seven Rally2 crews in the WRC2 Championship and eighteen Rally3 crew in the WRC3 Championship. A total of twelve crews participated in the Junior World Rally Championship.

Rally1 entries competing in the World Rally Championship
No.	Driver	Co-Driver	Entrant	Car	Championship eligibility	Tyre
1	(Belgium) Thierry Neuville	(Belgium) Martijn Wydaeghe	(South Korea) Hyundai Shell Mobis WRT	Hyundai i20 N Rally1	Driver, Co-driver, Manufacturer	H
2	(Portugal) Diogo Salvi	(Spain) Axel Coronado	(United Kingdom) M-Sport Ford WRT	Ford Puma Rally1	Driver, Co-driver	H
5	(Finland) Sami Pajari	(Finland) Marko Salminen	(Japan) Toyota Gazoo Racing WRT2	Toyota GR Yaris Rally1	Driver, Co-driver, Manufacturer, Team	H
8	(Estonia) Ott Tänak	(Estonia) Martin Järveoja	(South Korea) Hyundai Shell Mobis WRT	Hyundai i20 N Rally1	Driver, Co-driver, Manufacturer	H
13	(Luxembourg) Grégoire Munster	(Belgium) Louis Louka	(United Kingdom) M-Sport Ford WRT	Ford Puma Rally1	Driver, Co-driver, Manufacturer	H
16	(France) Adrien Fourmaux	(France) Alexandre Coria	(South Korea) Hyundai Shell Mobis WRT	Hyundai i20 N Rally1	Driver, Co-driver, Manufacturer	H
17	(France) Sébastien Ogier	(France) Vincent Landais	(Japan) Toyota Gazoo Racing WRT	Toyota GR Yaris Rally1	Driver, Co-driver, Manufacturer	H
18	(Japan) Takamoto Katsuta	(Republic of Ireland) Aaron Johnston	(Japan) Toyota Gazoo Racing WRT	Toyota GR Yaris Rally1	Driver, Co-driver	H
22	(Latvia) Mārtiņš Sesks	(Latvia) Renārs Francis	(United Kingdom) M-Sport Ford WRT	Ford Puma Rally1	Driver, Co-driver	H
33	(United Kingdom) Elfyn Evans	(United Kingdom) Scott Martin	(Japan) Toyota Gazoo Racing WRT	Toyota GR Yaris Rally1	Driver, Co-driver, Manufacturer	H
55	(Republic of Ireland) Josh McErlean	(Republic of Ireland) Eoin Treacy	(United Kingdom) M-Sport Ford WRT	Ford Puma Rally1	Driver, Co-driver, Manufacturer	H
69	(Finland) Kalle Rovanperä	(Finland) Jonne Halttunen	(Japan) Toyota Gazoo Racing WRT	Toyota GR Yaris Rally1	Driver, Co-driver, Manufacturer	H

Rally2 entries competing in the WRC2 Championship
No.	Driver	Co-Driver	Entrant	Car	Championship eligibility	Tyre
20	(Sweden) Oliver Solberg	(United Kingdom) Elliott Edmondson	(Finland) Printsport	Toyota GR Yaris Rally2	Driver, Co-driver	H
21	(France) Yohan Rossel	(France) Arnaud Dunand	(France) PH Sport	Citroën C3 Rally2	Driver, Co-driver, Team	H
23	(United Kingdom) Gus Greensmith	(Sweden) Jonas Andersson	(United Kingdom) Gus Greensmith	Škoda Fabia RS Rally2	Driver, Co-driver	H
24	(Paraguay) Fabrizio Zaldivar	(Italy) Marcelo Der Ohannesian	(Paraguay) Fabrizio Zaldivar	Škoda Fabia RS Rally2	Challenger Driver, Challenger Co-driver	H
25	(Spain) Jan Solans	(Spain) Rodrigo Sanjuan de Eusebio	(Spain) PH.Ph	Toyota GR Yaris Rally2	Driver, Co-driver	H
26	(Finland) Roope Korhonen	(Finland) Anssi Viinikka	(Finland) Roope Korhonen	Toyota GR Yaris Rally2	Challenger Driver, Challenger Co-driver	H
27	(France) Léo Rossel	(France) Guillaume Mercoiret	(France) PH Sport	Citroën C3 Rally2	Challenger Driver, Challenger Co-driver, Team	H
28	(Finland) Mikko Heikkilä	(Finland) Kristian Temonen	(Finland) Mikko Heikkilä	Škoda Fabia RS Rally2	Challenger Driver, Challenger Co-driver	H
29	(Finland) Lauri Joona	(Finland) Samu Vaaleri	(Finland) Lauri Joona	Škoda Fabia RS Rally2	Challenger Driver, Challenger Co-driver	H
30	(Italy) Roberto Daprà	(Italy) Luca Beltrame	(Italy) Roberto Daprà	Škoda Fabia RS Rally2	Challenger Driver, Challenger Co-driver	H
31	(Poland) Kajetan Kajetanowicz	(Poland) Maciej Szczepaniak	(Poland) Kajetan Kajetanowicz	Toyota GR Yaris Rally2	Challenger Driver, Challenger Co-driver	H
32	(France) Pablo Sarrazin	(France) Geoffrey Combe	(Italy) Sarrazin Motorsport – Iron Lynx	Citroën C3 Rally2	Challenger Driver, Challenger Co-driver, Team	H
34	(Estonia) Romet Jürgenson	(Estonia) Siim Oja	FIA Rally Star	Ford Fiesta Rally2	Challenger Driver, Challenger Co-driver	H
36	(Japan) Yuki Yamamoto	(Republic of Ireland) James Fulton	(Japan) Toyota Gazoo Racing WRT NG	Toyota GR Yaris Rally2	Challenger Driver, Challenger Co-driver, Team	H
37	(France) Sarah Rumeau	(France) Julie Amblard	(Italy) Sarrazin Motorsport – Iron Lynx	Citroën C3 Rally2	Challenger Driver, Challenger Co-driver, Team	H
38	(Mexico) Alejandro Mauro	(Spain) Adrián Pérez	(Mexico) Alejandro Mauro	Škoda Fabia RS Rally2	Challenger Driver, Challenger Co-driver	H
42	(Estonia) Robert Virves	(Estonia) Jakko Viilo	(Germany) Toksport WRT	Škoda Fabia RS Rally2	Challenger Driver, Challenger Co-driver	H
43	(France) Pierre-Louis Loubet	(France) Loris Pascaud	(United Kingdom) M-Sport Ford WRT	Ford Fiesta Rally2	Driver, Co-driver	H
44	(Estonia) Georg Linnamäe	(United Kingdom) James Morgan	(Estonia) Georg Linnamäe	Toyota GR Yaris Rally2	Challenger Driver, Challenger Co-driver	H
45	(Bolivia) Marco Bulacia	(Spain) Diego Vallejo	(Bolivia) Marco Bulacia	Toyota GR Yaris Rally2	Challenger Driver, Challenger Co-driver	H
48	(Bolivia) Bruno Bulacia	(Brazil) Gabriel Morales	(Bolivia) Bruno Bulacia	Toyota GR Yaris Rally2	Challenger Driver, Challenger Co-driver	H
50	(Portugal) Pedro Almeida	(Portugal) António Costa	(Portugal) Pedro Almeida	Škoda Fabia RS Rally2	Challenger Driver, Challenger Co-driver	H
52	(Portugal) Pedro Meireles	(Portugal) Mário Castro	(Portugal) Pedro Meireles	Škoda Fabia RS Rally2	Challenger/Master Driver, Challenger Co-driver	H
53	(Spain) Alejandro Cachón	(Spain) Borja Rozada	(Spain) Toyota España	Toyota GR Yaris Rally2	Challenger Driver, Challenger Co-driver	H
54	(Japan) Hikaru Kogure	(Finland) Topi Matias Luhtinen	(Japan) Toyota Gazoo Racing WRT NG	Toyota GR Yaris Rally2	Challenger Driver, Challenger Co-driver, Team	H
56	(Netherlands) Bernhard ten Brinke	(United Kingdom) Tom Woodburn	(Netherlands) Bernhard ten Brinke	Škoda Fabia RS Rally2	Challenger Driver, Challenger Co-driver	H
57	(Portugal) Armindo Araújo	(Portugal) Luís Ramalho	(Portugal) Armindo Araújo	Škoda Fabia RS Rally2	Challenger Driver, Challenger Co-driver	H
58	(Germany) Fabio Schwarz	(Austria) Bernhard Ettel	(Germany) Fabio Schwarz	Toyota GR Yaris Rally2	Challenger Driver, Challenger Co-driver	H
59	(Italy) Giovanni Trentin	(Italy) Alessandro Franco	(Italy) MT Racing SRL	Škoda Fabia RS Rally2	Challenger Driver, Challenger Co-driver	H
60	(Spain) Diego Ruiloba	(Spain) Ángel Vela	(Spain) Diego Ruiloba	Citroën C3 Rally2	Challenger Driver, Challenger Co-driver	H
61	(Portugal) Ernesto Cunha	(Portugal) Valter Cardoso	(Portugal) Ernesto Cunha	Škoda Fabia Rally2 evo	Challenger Driver, Challenger Co-driver	H
64	(Saudi Arabia) Rakan Al-Rashed	(Portugal) Hugo Magalhães	(Finland) Printsport	Škoda Fabia RS Rally2	Challenger Driver, Challenger Co-driver	H
65	(Spain) Alexander Villanueva	(Spain) Alberto Chamorro	(Spain) Alexander Villanueva	Škoda Fabia RS Rally2	Challenger/Master Driver, Challenger Co-driver	H
66	(Mexico) Miguel Granados	(Spain) Marc Martí	(Mexico) Miguel Granados	Škoda Fabia RS Rally2	Challenger/Masters Driver, Challenger/Masters Co-driver	H
67	(Italy) Rachele Somaschini	(Italy) Nicola Arena	(Italy) Rachele Somaschini	Citroën C3 Rally2	Challenger Driver, Challenger Co-driver	H
68	(Turkey) Uğur Soylu	(Turkey) Sener Güray	(Turkey) GP Garage My Team	Škoda Fabia RS Rally2	Challenger/Masters Driver, Challenger Co-driver	H
70	(Portugal) Diogo Marujo	(Portugal) Jorge Carvalho	(Portugal) Diogo Marujo	Škoda Fabia Rally2 evo	Challenger Driver, Challenger Co-driver	H
71	(Romania) Eugen Cărăgui	(Romania) Robert Patrick Fus	(Romania) Eugen Cărăgui	Citroën C3 Rally2	Challenger Driver, Challenger Co-driver	H
72	(Romania) Cristian Dolofan	(Romania) Traian Pavel	(Romania) Cristian Dolofan	Citroën C3 Rally2	Challenger Driver, Challenger Co-driver	H
73	(Netherlands) Peter van Merksteijn Jr.	(Netherlands) Erwin Berkhof	(Netherlands) Peter van Merksteijn Jr.	Volkswagen Polo GTI R5	Challenger Driver, Challenger Co-driver	H
74	(Mexico) Juan Carlos Peralta	(Mexico) Victor Peréz	(Mexico) Juan Carlos Peralta	Škoda Fabia RS Rally2	Challenger Driver, Challenger Co-driver	H
75	(Peru) Jorge Martínez	(Chile) José Alberto Aros	(Peru) Jorge Martínez	Hyundai i20 N Rally2	Challenger/Masters Driver, Challenger Co-driver	H
76	(Portugal) Francisco Teixeira	(Portugal) João Serôdio	(Portugal) Francisco Teixeira	Škoda Fabia Rally2 evo	Challenger/Masters Driver, Challenger Co-driver	H

Rally3 entries competing in the WRC3 Championship and/or the Junior World Rally Championship
No.	Driver	Co-Driver	Entrant	Car	Class eligibility	Tyre
77	(France) Arthur Pelamourges	(France) Bastien Pouget	(France) Arthur Pelamourges	Renault Clio Rally3	WRC3	H
78	(France) Ghjuvanni Rossi	(France) Kylian Sarmezan	(France) Ghjuvanni Rossi	Ford Fiesta Rally3	WRC3	H
79	(Japan) Takumi Matsushita	(Finland) Pekka Kelander	(Japan) Toyota Gazoo Racing WRT NG	Renault Clio Rally3	WRC3	H
80	(France) Mattéo Chatillon	(France) Maxence Cornuau	(France) Mattéo Chatillon	Renault Clio Rally3	WRC3	H
81	(France) Tom Pellerey	(France) Hervé Faucher	(France) Tom Pellerey	Renault Clio Rally3	WRC3	H
82	(Japan) Shotaro Goto	(Finland) Jussi Lindberg	(Japan) Toyota Gazoo Racing WRT NG	Renault Clio Rally3	WRC3	H
83	(Bolivia) Nataniel Bruun	(Argentina) Pablo Olmos	(Bolivia) Nataniel Bruun	Ford Fiesta Rally3	WRC3	H
84	(Uruguay) Federico Ensslin	(Spain) Alejandro López	(Spain) Past Racing	Ford Fiesta Rally3	WRC3	H
85	(Peru) André Martinez	(Argentina) Matias Aranguren	(Peru) André Martinez	Ford Fiesta Rally3	WRC3	H
86	(Sweden) Mille Johansson	(Sweden) Johan Grönvall	(Sweden) Mille Johansson	Ford Fiesta Rally3	Junior WRC	H
87	(Australia) Taylor Gill	(Australia) Daniel Brkic	FIA Rally Star	Ford Fiesta Rally3	WRC3, Junior WRC	H
88	(Republic of Ireland) Eamonn Kelly	(Republic of Ireland) Conor Mohan	(Republic of Ireland) Motorsport Ireland Rally Academy	Ford Fiesta Rally3	Junior WRC	H
89	(Turkey) Ali Türkkan	(Turkey) Oytun Albaykar	(Turkey) Castrol Ford Team Türkiye	Ford Fiesta Rally3	WRC3, Junior WRC	H
90	(Turkey) Kerem Kazaz	(France) Corentin Silvestre	(Turkey) Team Petrol Ofisi	Ford Fiesta Rally3	WRC3, Junior WRC	H
91	(Belgium) Thomas Martens	(United Kingdom) Max Freeman	(Belgium) Thomas Martens	Ford Fiesta Rally3	Junior WRC	H
92	(Germany) Claire Schönborn	(Germany) Jara Hain	WRC Young Driver Program	Ford Fiesta Rally3	WRC3, Junior WRC	H
93	(France) Tristan Charpentier	(France) Florian Barral	(France) Tristan Charpentier	Ford Fiesta Rally3	WRC3, Junior WRC	H
94	(Paraguay) Diego Dominguez Jr.	(Spain) Rogelio Peñate	(Paraguay) Diego Dominguez Jr.	Ford Fiesta Rally3	WRC3, Junior WRC	H
95	(South Africa) Max Smart	(United Kingdom) Cameron Fair	FIA Rally Star	Ford Fiesta Rally3	WRC3, Junior WRC	H
96	(Estonia) Joosep Ralf Nõgene	(Estonia) Aleks Lesk	(Estonia) LightGrey	Ford Fiesta Rally3	WRC3, Junior WRC	H
97	(Jordan) Shaker Jweihan	(Lithuania) Aisvydas Paliukėnas	(Jordan) Shaker Jweihan	Ford Fiesta Rally3	Junior WRC	H

Other major entries
No.	Driver	Co-Driver	Entrant	Car	Tyre
39	(Bulgaria) Nikolay Gryazin	(Kyrgyzstan) Konstantin Aleksandrov	(Bulgaria) Nikolay Gryazin	Škoda Fabia RS Rally2	H
40	(Spain) Dani Sordo	(Spain) Cándido Carrera	(Spain) Dani Sordo	Hyundai i20 N Rally2	H
41	(United Kingdom) Kris Meeke	(United Kingdom) Stuart Loudon	(United Kingdom) Kris Meeke	Toyota GR Yaris Rally2	H
46	(Portugal) Gonçalo Henriques	(Portugal) Inês Veiga	(Portugal) Gonçalo Henriques	Hyundai i20 N Rally2	H
49	(Portugal) Ricardo Teodósio	(Portugal) José Teixeira	(Portugal) Ricardo Teodósio	Toyota GR Yaris Rally2	H
51	(Portugal) José Pedro Fontes	(Portugal) Inês Ponte	(Portugal) José Pedro Fontes	Citroën C3 Rally2	H

=== Itinerary ===
All dates and times are in WEST (UTC+1).

Date	No.	Time span	Stage name	Distance
15 May	—	After 8:01	Baltar [Shakedown]	5.72 km
15 May		After 17:00	Opening ceremony, Coimbra	—N/a
15 May	SS1	After 19:05	SSS Figueira da Foz	2.94 km
15 May		After 19:18	Tyre fitting zone, Figueira da Foz	—N/a
16 May	SS2	After 7:35	Mortágua 1	14.59 km
16 May	SS3	After 9:05	Lousã 1	12.28 km
16 May	SS4	After 9:53	Góis 1	14.30 km
16 May	SS5	After 10:41	Arganil 1	14.41 km
16 May		11:16 – 11:31	Regroup, Arganil	—N/a
16 May		11:31 – 11:51	Remote service 1, Arganil	—N/a
16 May	SS6	After 9:05	Lousã 2	12.28 km
16 May	SS7	After 9:53	Góis 2	14.30 km
16 May	SS8	After 10:41	Arganil 2	14.41 km
16 May		15:16 – 15:31	Regroup, Arganil	—N/a
16 May		15:31 – 15:51	Remote service 2, Arganil	—N/a
16 May	SS9	After 17:05	Mortágua 2	14.59 km
16 May	SS10	After 18:35	Águeda / Sever	15.08 km
16 May	SS11	After 19:20	Sever / Albergaria	20.24 km
16 May		21:15 – 22:04	Flexi service A, Exponor	—N/a
17 May	SS12	After 7:35	Vieira do Minho 1	17.69 km
17 May	SS13	After 8:35	Cabeceiras de Basto 1	19.91 km
17 May	SS14	After 10:25	Amarante 1	22.10 km
17 May		12:16 – 12:46	Regroup, Exponor	—N/a
17 May		12:46 – 13:30	Service B, Exponor	—N/a
17 May	SS15	After 15:05	Vieira do Minho 2	17.69 km
17 May	SS16	After 16:05	Cabeceiras de Basto 2	19.91 km
17 May	SS17	After 17:55	Amarante 2	22.10 km
17 May	SS18	After 19:05	SSS Lousada	3.52 km
17 May		20:15 – 21:04	Flexi service C, Exponor	—N/a
18 May	SS19	After 6:43	Paredes 1	16.09 km
18 May	SS20	After 7:48	Felgueiras 1	8.81 km
18 May	SS21	After 8:35	Fafe 1	11.18 km
18 May	SS22	After 9:58	Paredes 2	16.09 km
18 May	SS23	After 11:03	Felgueiras 2	8.81 km
18 May		11:30 – 12:50	Regroup, Fafe	—N/a
18 May	SS24	After 13:15	Fafe 2 [Power Stage]	11.18 km
18 May		After 15:00	Finish, Matosinhos	—N/a
18 May		After 16:00	Podium ceremony, Matosinhos	—N/a

== Report ==
=== WRC Rally1 ===
==== Classification ====
Position		No.	Driver	Co-driver	Entrant	Car	Time	Difference	Points			
Event	Class	No.	Driver	Co-driver	Entrant	Car	Time	Difference	Event	Sunday	Stage	Total
1	1	17	Sébastien Ogier	Vincent Landais	Toyota Gazoo Racing WRT	Toyota GR Yaris Rally1	3:48:35.9	0.0	25	2	1	28
2	2	8	Ott Tänak	Martin Järveoja	Hyundai Shell Mobis WRT	Hyundai i20 N Rally1	3:48:44.6	+8.7	17	5	5	27
3	3	69	Kalle Rovanperä	Jonne Halttunen	Toyota Gazoo Racing WRT	Toyota GR Yaris Rally1	3:48:48.1	+12.2	15	4	3	22
4	4	1	Thierry Neuville	Martijn Wydaeghe	Hyundai Shell Mobis WRT	Hyundai i20 N Rally1	3:49:14.4	+38.5	12	3	4	19
5	5	18	Takamoto Katsuta	Aaron Johnston	Toyota Gazoo Racing WRT	Toyota GR Yaris Rally1	3:50:17.8	+1:41.9	10	0	0	10
6	6	33	Elfyn Evans	Scott Martin	Toyota Gazoo Racing WRT	Toyota GR Yaris Rally1	3:51:06.9	+2:31.0	8	1	0	9
7	7	5	Sami Pajari	Marko Salminen	Toyota Gazoo Racing WRT2	Toyota GR Yaris Rally1	3:51:14.2	+2:38.3	6	0	0	6
8	8	55	Josh McErlean	Eoin Treacy	M-Sport Ford WRT	Ford Puma Rally1	3:53:48.2	+5:12.3	4	0	0	4
9	9	13	Grégoire Munster	Louis Louka	M-Sport Ford WRT	Ford Puma Rally1	3:54:33.4	+5:57.5	2	0	0	2
15	10	22	Mārtiņš Sesks	Renārs Francis	M-Sport Ford WRT	Ford Puma Rally1	4:01:04.1	+12:28.2	0	0	0	0
31	11	2	Diogo Salvi	Axel Coronado	M-Sport Ford WRT	Ford Puma Rally1	4:17:30.7	+28:54.8	0	0	0	0
Retired SS24		16	Adrien Fourmaux	Alexandre Coria	Hyundai Shell Mobis WRT	Hyundai i20 N Rally1	Withdrawn		0	0	0	0

==== Special stages ====
Stage	Winners	Car	Time	Class leaders
SD	Sesks / Francis	Ford Puma Rally1	3:52.3	—N/a
SS1	Evans / Martin	Toyota GR Yaris Rally1	2:18.1	Evans / Martin
SS2	Tänak / Järveoja	Hyundai i20 N Rally1	9:14.9	Tänak / Järveoja
SS3	Tänak / Järveoja	Hyundai i20 N Rally1	9:04.6	Tänak / Järveoja
SS4	Fourmaux / Coria	Hyundai i20 N Rally1	9:07.1	Tänak / Järveoja
SS5	Fourmaux / Coria	Hyundai i20 N Rally1	8:55.8	Tänak / Järveoja
SS6	Ogier / Landais	Toyota GR Yaris Rally1	8:59.8	Tänak / Järveoja
SS7	Katsuta / Johnston	Toyota GR Yaris Rally1	9:02.5	Tänak / Järveoja
SS8	Neuville / Wydaeghe	Hyundai i20 N Rally1	8:41.4	Tänak / Järveoja
SS9	Tänak / Järveoja	Hyundai i20 N Rally1	9:11.6	Tänak / Järveoja
SS10	Ogier / Landais	Toyota GR Yaris Rally1	11:10.8	Tänak / Järveoja
SS11	Tänak / Järveoja	Hyundai i20 N Rally1	15:26.5	Tänak / Järveoja
SS12	Ogier / Landais	Toyota GR Yaris Rally1	10:35.7	Tänak / Järveoja
SS13	Ogier / Landais	Toyota GR Yaris Rally1	13:18.1	Tänak / Järveoja
SS14	Tänak / Järveoja	Hyundai i20 N Rally1	14:36.8	Tänak / Järveoja
SS15	Tänak / Järveoja	Hyundai i20 N Rally1	10:31.0	Tänak / Järveoja
SS16	Tänak / Järveoja	Hyundai i20 N Rally1	13:08.1	Tänak / Järveoja
SS17	Rovanperä / Halttunen	Toyota GR Yaris Rally1	14:35.8	Ogier / Landais
SS18	Ogier / Landais	Toyota GR Yaris Rally1	2:30.5	Ogier / Landais
SS19	Rovanperä / Halttunen	Toyota GR Yaris Rally1	11:22.4	Ogier / Landais
SS20	Tänak / Järveoja	Hyundai i20 N Rally1	5:45.9	Ogier / Landais
SS21	Tänak / Järveoja	Hyundai i20 N Rally1	6:29.7	Ogier / Landais
SS22	Tänak / Järveoja	Hyundai i20 N Rally1	11:15.7	Ogier / Landais
SS23	Tänak / Järveoja	Hyundai i20 N Rally1	5:42.1	Ogier / Landais
SS24	Tänak / Järveoja	Hyundai i20 N Rally1	6:22.7	Ogier / Landais

==== Championship standings ====
Drivers' Standings
Move	Pos.	Driver	Points
	1	Elfyn Evans	118
	2	Kalle Rovanperä	88
1	3	Sébastien Ogier	86
1	4	Ott Tänak	84
2	5	Thierry Neuville	78

Co-drivers' Standings
Move	Pos.	Driver	Points
	1	Scott Martin	118
	2	Jonne Halttunen	88
1	3	Vincent Landais	86
1	4	Martin Järveoja	84
2	5	Martijn Wydaeghe	78

Manufacturers' Standings
Move	Pos.	Driver	Points
	1	Toyota Gazoo Racing WRT	258
	2	Hyundai Shell Mobis WRT	203
	3	M-Sport Ford WRT	72
	4	Toyota Gazoo Racing WRT2	36

=== WRC2 Rally2 ===
==== Classification ====
Position		No.	Driver	Co-driver	Entrant	Car	Time	Difference	Points	
Event	Class	No.	Driver	Co-driver	Entrant	Car	Time	Difference	Class	Event
10	1	20	Oliver Solberg	Elliott Edmondson	Printsport	Toyota GR Yaris Rally2	3:57:51.0	0.0	25	1
11	2	21	Yohan Rossel	Arnaud Dunand	PH Sport	Citroën C3 Rally2	3:58:42.8	+51.8	17	0
12	3	23	Gus Greensmith	Jonas Andersson	Gus Greensmith	Škoda Fabia RS Rally2	3:58:59.2	+1:08.2	15	0
13	4	26	Roope Korhonen	Anssi Viinikka	Roope Korhonen	Toyota GR Yaris Rally2	3:59:55.7	+2:04.7	12	0
14	5	25	Jan Solans	Rodrigo Sanjuan de Eusebio	PH.Ph	Toyota GR Yaris Rally2	4:01:02.4	+3:11.4	10	0
16	6	30	Roberto Daprà	Luca Beltrame	Roberto Daprà	Škoda Fabia RS Rally2	4:01:32.1	+4:41.1	8	0
17	7	43	Pierre-Louis Loubet	Loris Pascaud	M-Sport Ford WRT	Ford Fiesta Rally2	4:01:58.3	+4:07.3	6	0
18	8	28	Mikko Heikkilä	Kristian Temonen	Mikko Heikkilä	Škoda Fabia RS Rally2	4:02:04.7	+4:13.7	4	0
19	9	45	Marco Bulacia	Diego Vallejo	Marco Bulacia	Toyota GR Yaris Rally2	4:02:48.1	+4:57.1	2	0
20	10	31	Kajetan Kajetanowicz	Maciej Szczepaniak	Kajetan Kajetanowicz	Toyota GR Yaris Rally2	4:04:02.7	+6:11.7	1	0
21	11	34	Romet Jürgenson	Siim Oja	FIA Rally Star	Ford Fiesta Rally2	4:04:25.5	+6:34.5	0	0
22	12	24	Fabrizio Zaldivar	Marcelo Der Ohannesian	Fabrizio Zaldivar	Škoda Fabia RS Rally2	4:06:47.1	+8:56.1	0	0
23	13	27	Léo Rossel	Guillaume Mercoiret	PH Sport	Citroën C3 Rally2	4:07:03.2	+9:12.2	0	0
24	14	48	Bruno Bulacia	Gabriel Morales	Bruno Bulacia	Toyota GR Yaris Rally2	4:07:52.2	+10:01.2	0	0
25	15	54	Hikaru Kogure	Topi Matias Luhtinen	Toyota Gazoo Racing WRT NG	Toyota GR Yaris Rally2	4:09:42.8	+11:51.8	0	0
26	16	57	Armindo Araújo	Luís Ramalho	Armindo Araújo	Škoda Fabia RS Rally2	4:11:18.1	+13:27.1	0	0
27	17	37	Sarah Rumeau	Julie Amblard	Sarrazin Motorsport – Iron Lynx	Citroën C3 Rally2	4:13:05.0	+15:14.0	0	0
30	18	52	Pedro Meireles	Mário Castro	Pedro Meireles	Škoda Fabia RS Rally2	4:17:03.0	+19:12.0	0	0
32	19	64	Rakan Al-Rashed	Hugo Magalhães	Printsport	Škoda Fabia RS Rally2	4:18:10.1	+20:19.1	0	0
40	20	56	Bernhard ten Brinke	Tom Woodburn	Bernhard ten Brinke	Škoda Fabia RS Rally2	4:24:14.6	+26:23.6	0	0
41	21	68	Uğur Soylu	Sener Güray	GP Garage My Team	Škoda Fabia RS Rally2	4:25:31.8	+27:40.8	0	0
43	22	70	Diogo Marujo	Jorge Carvalho	Diogo Marujo	Škoda Fabia Rally2 evo	4:26:05.6	+28:14.6	0	0
45	23	36	Yuki Yamamoto	James Fulton	Toyota Gazoo Racing WRT NG	Toyota GR Yaris Rally2	4:27:47.6	+29:56.6	0	0
47	24	74	Juan Carlos Peralta	Victor Peréz	Juan Carlos Peralta	Škoda Fabia RS Rally2	4:31:09.2	+33:18.2	0	0
49	25	29	Lauri Joona	Samu Vaaleri	Lauri Joona	Škoda Fabia RS Rally2	4:36:28.7	+38:37.7	0	0
50	26	67	Rachele Somaschini	Nicola Arena	Rachele Somaschini	Citroën C3 Rally2	4:38:27.5	+40:36.5	0	0
53	27	76	Francisco Teixeira	João Serôdio	Francisco Teixeira	Škoda Fabia Rally2 evo	4:52:13.7	+54:22.7	0	0
54	28	72	Cristian Dolofan	Traian Pavel	Cristian Dolofan	Citroën C3 Rally2	5:02:25.8	+1:04:34.8	0	0
55	29	38	Alejandro Mauro	Adrián Pérez	Alejandro Mauro	Škoda Fabia RS Rally2	5:05:33.7	+1:07:42.7	0	0
57	30	44	Georg Linnamäe	James Morgan	Georg Linnamäe	Toyota GR Yaris Rally2	5:09:31.5	+1:11:40.5	0	0
63	31	66	Miguel Granados	Marc Martí	Miguel Granados	Škoda Fabia RS Rally2	5:51:17.7	+1:53:26.7	0	0
Retired SS23		75	Jorge Martínez	José Alberto Aros	Jorge Martínez	Hyundai i20 N Rally2	Withdrawn		0	0
Retired SS20		71	Eugen Cărăgui	Robert Patrick Fus	Eugen Cărăgui	Citroën C3 Rally2	Withdrawn		0	0
Completed SS12		50	Pedro Almeida	António Costa	Pedro Almeida	Škoda Fabia RS Rally2	National Only		0	0
Retired SS12		32	Pablo Sarrazin	Geoffrey Combe	Sarrazin Motorsport – Iron Lynx	Citroën C3 Rally2	Mechanical		0	0
Retired SS12		42	Robert Virves	Jakko Viilo	Toksport WRT	Škoda Fabia RS Rally2	Accident		0	0
Retired SS12		59	Giovanni Trentin	Alessandro Franco	MT Racing SRL	Škoda Fabia RS Rally2	Mechanical		0	0
Retired SS12		65	Alexander Villanueva	Alberto Chamorro	Alexander Villanueva	Škoda Fabia RS Rally2	Mechanical		0	0
Retired SS10		58	Fabio Schwarz	Bernhard Ettel	Fabio Schwarz	Toyota GR Yaris Rally2	Gearbox		0	0
Retired SS9		60	Diego Ruiloba	Ángel Vela	Diego Ruiloba	Citroën C3 Rally2	Mechanical		0	0
Retired SS6		61	Ernesto Cunha	Valter Cardoso	Ernesto Cunha	Škoda Fabia Rally2 evo	Accident		0	0
Retired SS4		73	Peter van Merksteijn Jr.	Erwin Berkhof	Peter van Merksteijn Jr.	Volkswagen Polo GTI R5	Rolled		0	0

==== Special stages ====
Overall
Stage	Winners	Car	Time	Class leaders
SD	Solberg / Edmondson	Toyota GR Yaris Rally2	4:02.9	—N/a
SS1	Greensmith / Andersson	Škoda Fabia RS Rally2	2:23.6	Greensmith / Andersson
SS2	Solberg / Edmondson	Toyota GR Yaris Rally2	9:38.4	Solberg / Edmondson
SS3	Solberg / Edmondson	Toyota GR Yaris Rally2	9:22.4	Solberg / Edmondson
SS4	Solberg / Edmondson	Toyota GR Yaris Rally2	9:28.1	Solberg / Edmondson
SS5	Solberg / Edmondson	Toyota GR Yaris Rally2	9:10.6	Solberg / Edmondson
SS6	Y. Rossel / Dunand	Citroën C3 Rally2	9:22.2	Solberg / Edmondson
SS7	Solberg / Edmondson	Toyota GR Yaris Rally2	9:28.4	Solberg / Edmondson
SS8	Solberg / Edmondson	Toyota GR Yaris Rally2	9:05.7	Solberg / Edmondson
SS9	Solberg / Edmondson	Toyota GR Yaris Rally2	9:37.5	Solberg / Edmondson
SS10	Solberg / Edmondson	Toyota GR Yaris Rally2	11:26.9	Solberg / Edmondson
SS11	Solberg / Edmondson	Toyota GR Yaris Rally2	15:42.4	Solberg / Edmondson
SS12	Y. Rossel / Dunand	Citroën C3 Rally2	11:08.4	Solberg / Edmondson
SS13	Greensmith / Andersson	Škoda Fabia RS Rally2	13:49.8	Solberg / Edmondson
SS14	Korhonen / Viinikka	Toyota GR Yaris Rally2	15:15.5	Solberg / Edmondson
SS15	Korhonen / Viinikka	Toyota GR Yaris Rally2	11:00.0	Solberg / Edmondson
SS16	Solberg / Edmondson	Toyota GR Yaris Rally2	13:47.2	Solberg / Edmondson
SS17	Y. Rossel / Dunand	Citroën C3 Rally2	15:13.3	Solberg / Edmondson
SS18	Y. Rossel / Dunand	Citroën C3 Rally2	2:36.5	Solberg / Edmondson
SS19	Solberg / Edmondson	Toyota GR Yaris Rally2	11:54.6	Solberg / Edmondson
SS20	Y. Rossel / Dunand	Citroën C3 Rally2	6:04.2	Solberg / Edmondson
SS21	Solberg / Edmondson	Toyota GR Yaris Rally2	6:52.0	Solberg / Edmondson
SS22	Y. Rossel / Dunand	Citroën C3 Rally2	11:46.7	Solberg / Edmondson
SS23	Y. Rossel / Dunand	Citroën C3 Rally2	6:01.0	Solberg / Edmondson
SS24	Solberg / Edmondson	Toyota GR Yaris Rally2	6:50.6	Solberg / Edmondson

Challenger
Stage	Winners	Car	Time	Class leaders
SD	Virves / Viilo	Škoda Fabia RS Rally2	4:03.7	—N/a
SS1	Daprà / Beltrame	Škoda Fabia RS Rally2	2:23.7	Daprà / Beltrame
SS2	Solans / Sanjuan de Eusebio	Toyota GR Yaris Rally2	9:47.6	Korhonen / Viinikka
SS3	Korhonen / Viinikka	Toyota GR Yaris Rally2	9:32.1	Korhonen / Viinikka
SS4	Korhonen / Viinikka	Toyota GR Yaris Rally2	9:31.2	Korhonen / Viinikka
SS5	Virves / Viilo	Škoda Fabia RS Rally2	9:18.9	Korhonen / Viinikka
SS6	Virves / Viilo	Škoda Fabia RS Rally2	9:22.7	Virves / Viilo
SS7	Solans / Sanjuan de Eusebio	Toyota GR Yaris Rally2	9:28.7	Virves / Viilo
SS8	Virves / Viilo	Škoda Fabia RS Rally2	9:12.5	Virves / Viilo
SS9	Virves / Viilo	Škoda Fabia RS Rally2	9:38.2	Virves / Viilo
SS10	Korhonen / Viinikka	Toyota GR Yaris Rally2	11:40.9	Korhonen / Viinikka
SS11	Daprà / Beltrame	Škoda Fabia RS Rally2	16:04.1	Korhonen / Viinikka
SS12	Heikkilä / Temonen	Škoda Fabia RS Rally2	11:13.8	Korhonen / Viinikka
SS13	Korhonen / Viinikka	Toyota GR Yaris Rally2	13:51.8	Korhonen / Viinikka
SS14	Korhonen / Viinikka	Toyota GR Yaris Rally2	15:15.5	Korhonen / Viinikka
SS15	Korhonen / Viinikka	Toyota GR Yaris Rally2	11:00.0	Korhonen / Viinikka
SS16	Korhonen / Viinikka	Toyota GR Yaris Rally2	13:55.9	Korhonen / Viinikka
SS17	Korhonen / Viinikka	Toyota GR Yaris Rally2	15:15.9	Korhonen / Viinikka
SS18	L. Rossel / Mercoiret	Citroën C3 Rally2	2:37.1	Korhonen / Viinikka
SS19	Joona / Vaaleri	Škoda Fabia RS Rally2	11:54.9	Korhonen / Viinikka
SS20	Joona / Vaaleri	Škoda Fabia RS Rally2	6:06.2	Korhonen / Viinikka
SS21	Joona / Vaaleri	Škoda Fabia RS Rally2	6:54.4	Korhonen / Viinikka
SS22	Joona / Vaaleri	Škoda Fabia RS Rally2	11:50.1	Korhonen / Viinikka
SS23	Heikkilä / Temonen	Škoda Fabia RS Rally2	6:03.4	Korhonen / Viinikka
SS24	Joona / Vaaleri	Škoda Fabia RS Rally2	6:51.3	Korhonen / Viinikka

==== Championship standings ====
Drivers' Standings
Move	Pos.	Driver	Points
	1	Yohan Rossel	67
	2	Oliver Solberg	60
	3	Gus Greensmith	40
2	4	Roope Korhonen	29
2	5	Jan Solans	27

Co-drivers' Standings
Move	Pos.	Driver	Points
	1	Arnaud Dunand	67
	2	Elliott Edmondson	60
	3	Jonas Andersson	40
2	4	Anssi Viinikka	29
2	5	Rodrigo Sanjuan de Eusebio	27

Manufacturers' Standings
Move	Pos.	Driver	Points
	1	PH Sport	109
	2	Toyota Gazoo Racing WRT NG	79
1	3	Sarrazin Motorsport – Iron Lynx	39
1	4	Toksport WRT	32

Challenger Drivers' Standings
Move	Pos.	Driver	Points
2	1	Roope Korhonen	50
2	2	Jan Solans	42
4	3	Roberto Daprà	40
3	4	Fabrizio Zaldivar	31
3	5	Mikko Heikkilä	29

Challenger Co-drivers' Standings
Move	Pos.	Driver	Points
2	1	Anssi Viinikka	50
2	2	Diego Sanjuan de Eusebio	42
2	3	Marcelo Der Ohannesian	31
4	4	Kristian Temonen	29
3	5	Guillaume Mercoiret	27

=== WRC3 Rally3 ===
==== Classification ====
Position		No.	Driver	Co-driver	Entrant	Car	Time	Difference	Points
Event	Class	No.	Driver	Co-driver	Entrant	Car	Time	Difference	Points
28	1	87	Taylor Gill	Daniel Brkic	FIA Rally Star	Ford Fiesta Rally3	4:15:07.3	0.0	25
33	2	90	Kerem Kazaz	Corentin Silvestre	Team Petrol Ofisi	Ford Fiesta Rally3	4:19:19.0	+4:11.7	17
35	3	95	Max Smart	Cameron Fair	FIA Rally Star	Ford Fiesta Rally3	4:19:52.5	+4:45.2	15
36	4	83	Nataniel Bruun	Pablo Olmos	Nataniel Bruun	Ford Fiesta Rally3	4:20:29.7	+5:22.4	12
37	5	96	Joosep Ralf Nõgene	Aleks Lesk	LightGrey	Ford Fiesta Rally3	4:21:00.9	+5:53.6	10
38	6	79	Takumi Matsushita	Pekka Kelander	Toyota Gazoo Racing WRT NG	Renault Clio Rally3	4:21:26.9	+6:19.6	8
39	7	78	Ghjuvanni Rossi	Kylian Sarmezan	Ghjuvanni Rossi	Ford Fiesta Rally3	4:22:10.4	+7:03.1	6
48	8	94	Diego Dominguez Jr.	Rogelio Peñate	Diego Dominguez Jr.	Ford Fiesta Rally3	4:35:17.6	+20:10.3	4
51	9	89	Ali Türkkan	Oytun Albaykar	Castrol Ford Team Türkiye	Ford Fiesta Rally3	4:49:14.4	+34:07.1	2
52	10	81	Tom Pellerey	Hervé Faucher	Tom Pellerey	Renault Clio Rally3	4:51:10.7	+36:03.4	1
58	11	77	Arthur Pelamourges	Bastien Pouget	Arthur Pelamourges	Renault Clio Rally3	5:09:47.7	+54:40.4	0
61	12	93	Tristan Charpentier	Florian Barral	Tristan Charpentier	Ford Fiesta Rally3	5:39:22.6	+1:24:15.3	0
64	13	92	Claire Schönborn	Jara Hain	WRC Young Driver Program	Ford Fiesta Rally3	6:05:22.5	+1:50:15.2	0
66	14	85	André Martinez	Matias Aranguren	André Martinez	Ford Fiesta Rally3	6:42:09.6	+2:27:02.3	0
Retired SS19		84	Federico Ensslin	Alejandro López	Past Racing	Ford Fiesta Rally3	Mechanical		0
Retired SS19		80	Mattéo Chatillon	Maxence Cornuau	Mattéo Chatillon	Renault Clio Rally3	Mechanical		0
Did not start		82	Shotaro Goto	Jussi Lindberg	Toyota Gazoo Racing WRT NG	Renault Clio Rally3	Shakedown rolled		0

==== Special stages ====
Stage	Winners	Car	Time	Class leaders
SD	Charpentier / Barral	Ford Fiesta Rally3	4:14.7	—N/a
SS1	Chatillon / Cornuau	Renault Clio Rally3	2:34.3	Chatillon / Cornuau
SS2	Gill / Brkic	Ford Fiesta Rally3	10:19.2	Gill / Brkic
SS3	Pelamourges / Pouget	Renault Clio Rally3	9:59.1	Pelamourges / Pouget
SS4	Gill / Brkic	Ford Fiesta Rally3	10:03.8	Gill / Brkic
SS5	Gill / Brkic	Ford Fiesta Rally3	9:59.1	Gill / Brkic
SS6	Domínguez / Peñate	Ford Fiesta Rally3	10:08.0	Gill / Brkic
SS7	Gill / Brkic	Ford Fiesta Rally3	10:09.2	Gill / Brkic
SS8	Gill / Brkic	Ford Fiesta Rally3	9:52.8	Gill / Brkic
SS9	Gill / Brkic	Ford Fiesta Rally3	10:30.1	Gill / Brkic
SS10	Gill / Brkic	Ford Fiesta Rally3	12:25.4	Gill / Brkic
SS11	Kazaz / Silvestre	Ford Fiesta Rally3	17:04.0	Gill / Brkic
SS12	Gill / Brkic	Ford Fiesta Rally3	11:48.7	Gill / Brkic
SS13	Gill / Brkic	Ford Fiesta Rally3	14:43.1	Gill / Brkic
SS14	Charpentier / Barral	Ford Fiesta Rally3	16:10.7	Gill / Brkic
SS15	Charpentier / Barral	Ford Fiesta Rally3	11:47.7	Gill / Brkic
SS16	Bruun / Olmos	Ford Fiesta Rally3	15:05.1	Gill / Brkic
SS17	Gill / Brkic	Ford Fiesta Rally3	16:09.0	Gill / Brkic
SS18	Matsushita / Kelander	Renault Clio Rally3	2:44.0	Gill / Brkic
SS18	Charpentier / Barral	Ford Fiesta Rally3	2:44.0	Gill / Brkic
SS19	Domínguez / Peñate	Ford Fiesta Rally3	12:35.2	Gill / Brkic
SS20	Domínguez / Peñate	Ford Fiesta Rally3	6:27.8	Gill / Brkic
SS21	Charpentier / Barral	Ford Fiesta Rally3	7:19.1	Gill / Brkic
SS22	Gill / Brkic	Ford Fiesta Rally3	12:29.5	Gill / Brkic
SS23	Charpentier / Barral	Ford Fiesta Rally3	6:22.5	Gill / Brkic
SS24	Domínguez / Peñate	Ford Fiesta Rally3	7:14.5	Gill / Brkic

==== Championship standings ====
Drivers' Standings
Move	Pos.	Driver	Points
4	1	Taylor Gill	50
1	2	Arthur Pelamourges	42
1	3	Ghjuvanni Rossi	36
1	4	Matteo Fontana	34
2	5	Takumi Matsushita	32

Co-drivers' Standings
Move	Pos.	Driver	Points
4	1	Daniel Brkic	50
1	2	Bastien Pouget	42
1	3	Kylian Sarmezan	36
1	4	Alessandro Arnaboldi	34
2	5	Pekka Kelander	32

=== JWRC Rally3 ===
==== Classification ====
Position		No.	Driver	Co-driver	Entrant	Car	Time	Difference	Points	
Event	Class	No.	Driver	Co-driver	Entrant	Car	Time	Difference	Class	Stage
28	1	87	Taylor Gill	Daniel Brkic	FIA Rally Star	Ford Fiesta Rally3	4:15:07.3	0.0	25	7
29	2	86	Mille Johansson	Johan Grönvall	Mille Johansson	Ford Fiesta Rally3	4:15:20.7	+13.4	17	12
33	3	90	Kerem Kazaz	Corentin Silvestre	Team Petrol Ofisi	Ford Fiesta Rally3	4:19:19.0	+4:11.7	15	0
34	4	91	Thomas Martens	Max Freeman	Thomas Martens	Ford Fiesta Rally3	4:19:25.9	+4:18.6	12	0
35	5	95	Max Smart	Cameron Fair	FIA Rally Star	Ford Fiesta Rally3	4:19:52.5	+4:45.2	10	0
37	6	96	Joosep Ralf Nõgene	Aleks Lesk	LightGrey	Ford Fiesta Rally3	4:21:00.9	+5:53.6	8	0
42	7	88	Eamonn Kelly	Conor Mohan	Motorsport Ireland Rally Academy	Ford Fiesta Rally3	4:25:53.6	+10:46.3	6	1
48	8	94	Diego Dominguez Jr.	Rogelio Peñate	Diego Dominguez Jr.	Ford Fiesta Rally3	4:35:17.6	+20:10.3	4	1
51	9	89	Ali Türkkan	Oytun Albaykar	Castrol Ford Team Türkiye	Ford Fiesta Rally3	4:49:14.4	+34:07.1	2	0
61	10	93	Tristan Charpentier	Florian Barral	Tristan Charpentier	Ford Fiesta Rally3	5:39:22.6	+1:24:15.3	1	1
64	11	92	Claire Schönborn	Jara Hain	WRC Young Driver Program	Ford Fiesta Rally3	6:05:22.5	+1:50:15.2	0	0
Retired SS2		82	Shaker Jweihan	Aisvydas Paliukėnas	Shaker Jweihan	Ford Fiesta Rally3	Personal		0	0

==== Special stages ====
Stage	Winners	Car	Time	Class leaders
SD	Charpentier / Barral	Ford Fiesta Rally3	4:14.7	—N/a
SS1	Johansson / Grönvall	Ford Fiesta Rally3	2:34.7	Johansson / Grönvall
SS2	Gill / Brkic	Ford Fiesta Rally3	10:19.2	Gill / Brkic
SS3	Johansson / Grönvall	Ford Fiesta Rally3	10:07.6	Gill / Brkic
SS4	Gill / Brkic	Ford Fiesta Rally3	10:03.8	Gill / Brkic
SS5	Gill / Brkic	Ford Fiesta Rally3	9:59.1	Gill / Brkic
SS6	Domínguez / Peñate	Ford Fiesta Rally3	10:08.0	Gill / Brkic
SS7	Johansson / Grönvall	Ford Fiesta Rally3	10:07.8	Gill / Brkic
SS8	Gill / Brkic	Ford Fiesta Rally3	9:52.8	Gill / Brkic
SS9	Stage cancelled			
SS10	Johansson / Grönvall	Ford Fiesta Rally3	12:21.9	Gill / Brkic
SS11	Johansson / Grönvall	Ford Fiesta Rally3	17:02.9	Gill / Brkic
SS12	Gill / Brkic	Ford Fiesta Rally3	11:48.7	Gill / Brkic
SS13	Gill / Brkic	Ford Fiesta Rally3	14:43.1	Gill / Brkic
SS14	Johansson / Grönvall	Ford Fiesta Rally3	16:10.6	Gill / Brkic
SS15	Johansson / Grönvall	Ford Fiesta Rally3	11:42.9	Gill / Brkic
SS16	Johansson / Grönvall	Ford Fiesta Rally3	14:52.2	Gill / Brkic
SS17	Johansson / Grönvall	Ford Fiesta Rally3	16:08.1	Gill / Brkic
SS18	Johansson / Grönvall	Ford Fiesta Rally3	2:41.8	Gill / Brkic
SS19	Johansson / Grönvall	Ford Fiesta Rally3	12:32.5	Gill / Brkic
SS20	Kelly / Mohan	Ford Fiesta Rally3	6:25.2	Gill / Brkic
SS21	Johansson / Grönvall	Ford Fiesta Rally3	7:16.7	Gill / Brkic
SS22	Gill / Brkic	Ford Fiesta Rally3	12:29.5	Gill / Brkic
SS23	Charpentier / Barral	Ford Fiesta Rally3	6:22.5	Gill / Brkic
SS24	Johansson / Grönvall	Ford Fiesta Rally3	7:14.5	Gill / Brkic

==== Championship standings ====
Drivers' Standings
Move	Pos.	Driver	Points
1	1	Taylor Gill	59
1	2	Mille Johansson	59
2	3	Kerem Kazaz	26
1	4	Eamonn Kelly	22
1	5	Thomas Martens	20

Co-drivers' Standings
Move	Pos.	Driver	Points
1	1	Daniel Brkic	59
1	2	Johan Grönvall	59
2	3	Corentin Silvestre	26
1	4	Conor Mohan	22
1	5	Max Freeman	20

Previous rally: 2025 Safari Rally	2025 FIA World Rally Championship	Next rally: 2025 Rally Italia Sardegna
Previous rally: 2024 Rally de Portugal	2025 Rally de Portugal	Next rally: 2026 Rally de Portugal
