= Adrien Fourmaux =

French rally driver (born 1995)

- Fourmaux at the 2025 Monte Carlo Rally

Personal information
- Nationality: (France) French
- Full name: Adrien Jean Marc Fourmaux
- Born: 3 May 1995 (age 31); Seclin, France

World Rally Championship record
- Years active: 2019–present
- Co-driver: (Belgium) Renaud Jamoul (France) Alexandre Coria
- Teams: M-Sport (2020–2024); Hyundai (2025–present)
- Rallies: 75
- Championships: 0
- Rally wins: 0
- Podiums: 10
- Stage wins: 40
- Total points: 390
- First rally: 2019 Monte Carlo Rally
- Last rally: 2026 Rally Italia Sardegna

Adrien Jean Marc Fourmaux (born 3 May 1995) is a French professional rally driver. After contesting the 2024 FIA World Rally Championship (WRC) for M-Sport Ford in the WRC Rally1 category driving the Ford Puma, Fourmaux joined Hyundai Motorsport for 2025 to pilot a Hyundai i20 N Rally1, alongside his co-driver, Alexandre Coria.

Fourmaux won the British Rally Championship in 2023 in the Ford Fiesta Rally2 as well as competing in the WRC2 Championship for the 2023 season. Fourmaux achieved his first WRC podium at the 2024 Rally Sweden, securing a third-place finish in challenging conditions.

== Rally career ==
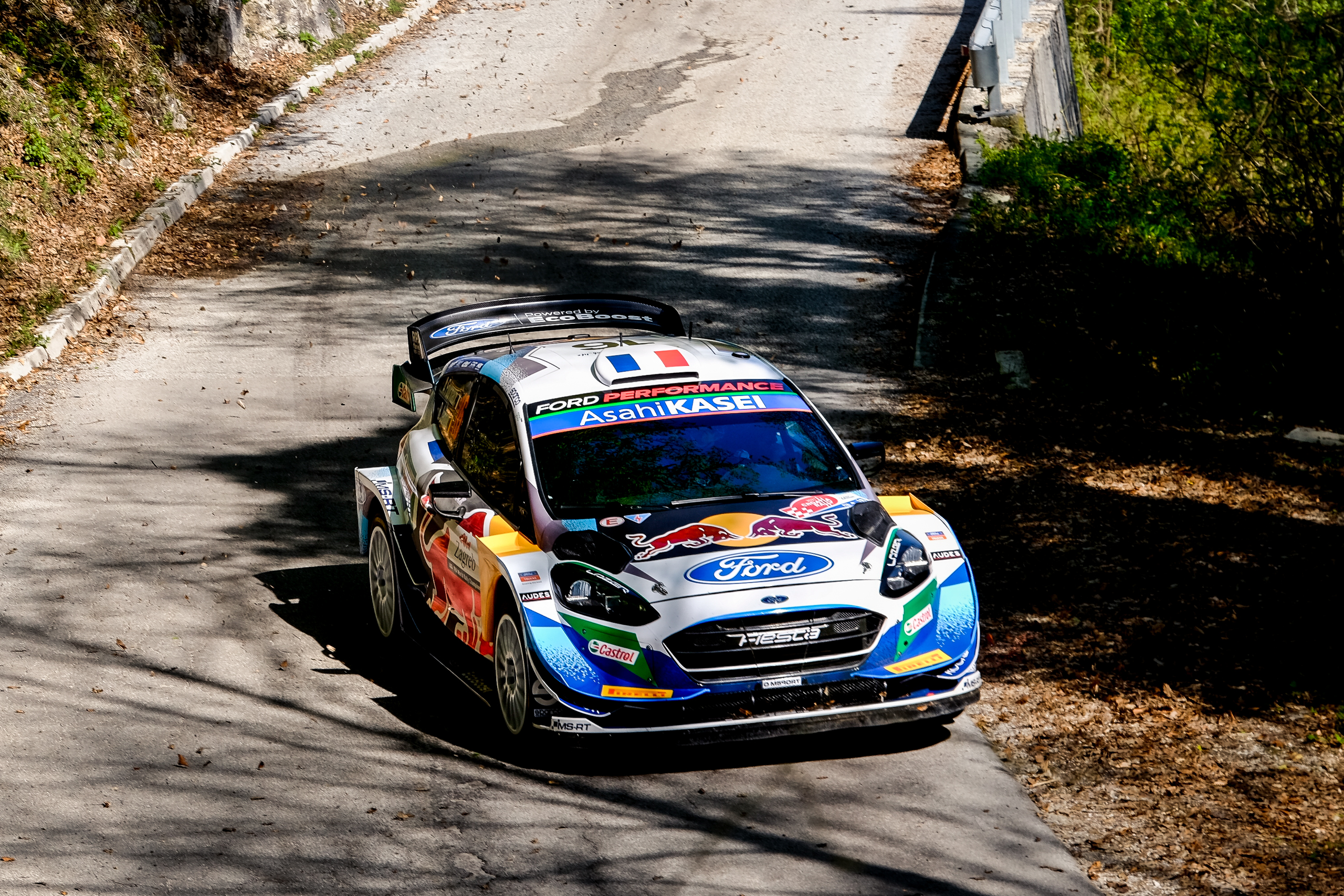
Adrien Fourmaux in the 2021 Croatia Rally.

=== Early years ===
Fourmaux first came into contact with rally driving when he took part in the Rallye Jeunes scouting programme organised by the FFSA in 2016. He won the competition and received help from the French federation from that point onwards; in parallel, Fourmaux began studying to become an orthopedic surgeon at the Lille Faculty of Medicine. Fourmaux made his rally debut in the French junior championship in 2017 and finished third in the drivers' standings after a solid season. He returned in 2018 and dominated the opening five rounds, thus winning the title with two events to spare.

With full backing of the FFSA and having abandoned his studies during his fourth year, Fourmaux joined experienced co-driver Renaud Jamoul in the WRC2 Championship, driving a Ford Fiesta R5 at M-Sport Ford. He made his WRC debut at the 2019 Monte Carlo Rally, finishing second in the WRC2 class and taking his first WRC career point by placing tenth overall. He scored another WRC2 podium later in the year with third place at the Wales Rally GB.

In 2020, Fourmaux was signed by M-Sport Ford WRT to compete in the WRC2. He started the campaign by winning seven stages at Monte Carlo, before a puncture dropped him to second. Fourth in Sweden preceded an early crash at the Rally di Roma Capitale in the ERC, though he regrouped to take two further WRC2 runner-up finishes in Estonia and Turkey. He ended up third in the standings alongside Jamoul. Fourmaux also won the Rally Islas Canarias at the end of the year in the final event of the ERC calendar.

=== WRC step-up, demotion, re-promotion ===
Fourmaux then progressed to the World Rally Championship in 2021, driving selected events in a Ford Fiesta WRC and partaking in the WRC-2 class during the remainder of the calendar. His WRC debut came in Croatia, where a fifth place caused him to be likened to rally legend Sébastien Ogier by team principal Richard Millener. He then scored his maiden WRC stage win in Kenya. Following the withdrawal of Teemu Suninen, Fourmaux contested the final five events of the WRC season together with Alexandre Coria, his new co-driver.

The pair remained at Ford M-Sport for the 2022 season, this time to contest the full campaign. The season began poorly, as Fourmaux retired from the first three events, experiencing a huge accident in stage three at Monte Carlo and crashing out in a garden in Croatia. Another crash came later in the year at the Ypres Rally; as a consequence of the chassis damage, Fourmaux was not entered in the following two events, while budget issues forced him to miss the season finale in Japan.

Fourmaux's lacklustre full-season debut led to M-Sport demoting him to the WRC2 for the 2023 season. Before embarking on his WRC2 campaign, he won the Jänner Rallye in Austria. In the WRC2, Fourmaux took part in eight rallies and finished a season-best second at the Rally Finland. In addition, he came close to winning the class at the Rally Italia Sardegna before crashing out during the Power Stage and won the Central European Rally, though he was ineligible for points. Parallel to his WRC2 commitments, Fourmaux and Coria won the British Rally Championship by winning all five of the events they entered. He also won the Ypres Rally in June. At the end of 2023, Fourmaux was recalled to Ford's WRC team to substitute for Pierre-Louis Loubet at the Rally Japan, though he would crash out of the event.

=== Final Ford season ===
Fourmaux, along with Coria, returned to M-Sport to contest the 2024 WRC season. After finishing fifth in Monte Carlo, Fourmaux scored his first WRC podium with third place in Sweden. Another podium followed at the Safari Rally in Kenya after a reliable drive. Fourmaux then won his maiden Power Stage in Croatia, finished fourth in Portugal, and scored his third podium in Poland. Fourth in Latvia and third in Finland came next, as Fourmaux benefited from a late crash for leader Kalle Rovanperä to inherit a spot on the rostrum. In Greece, Fourmaux clipped a rock on the opening day and fell out of contention, though he later won the Power Stage. After finishing fifth in Chile and encountering issues at the Central European Rally, Fourmaux capped off his season by finishing third in Japan. He ended up fifth in the drivers' standings. To cap off his tenure at Ford, whom he would leave for Hyundai, Fourmaux won the Monza Rally Show. On his Hyundai debut meanwhile, Fourmaux won the Rallye National Hivernal du Dévoluy.

=== Hyundai tenure ===
==== 2025 ====
Fourmaux started the 2025 campaign by finishing third at Monte Carlo, losing out on the rally win in a tight battle with Sébastien Ogier and Elfyn Evans. In Sweden, Fourmaux lost a podium place on Saturday morning by stopping for over 20 seconds to fasten his helmet strap, before crashing out on that day's stage 13. Having used the words "we fucked up yesterday" to describe his crash during a stage-end interview on Sunday, Fourmaux was fined 10,000 euros in light of the FIA's new anti-swearing guidelines. Fourmaux's competitors co-authored and signed a joint statement which criticised the fine; they later protested the FIA by staying silent or speaking only in their native tongue during stage-end interviews at the subsequent event in Kenya. At the event itself, Fourmaux suffered electrical trouble on the road section during the opening day and retired. A broken suspension caused by an earlier puncture forced another retirement the following day. During a difficult weekend for Hyundai at the Rally Islas Canarias, Fourmaux beat his teammates and finished fifth. He then fought for victory in Portugal, only to retire outright on Friday with a front-left suspension failure. In Italy, Fourmaux ran second before encountering a puncture early on during Saturday's running; his day ended in stage 11 when he flipped over his car.

At the Acropolis Rally, Fourmaux bounced back by finishing third, despite damaging his right-rear suspension by clipping a gravel bank during stage 10. He finished fifth in Estonia but retired late from the next two events in Finland and Paraguay. At the Rally Chile, Fourmaux took the lead on Friday night. He ended up third overall. Fourmaux finished fifth in the Central European Rally and fought for a podium in Japan, before retiring after crashing out amidst poor visibility in heavy rain. He capped off the season by finishing second in Saudi Arabia, being denied victory by a 1-minute time penalty for checking in ten seconds early for Friday's time control. Fourmaux finished seventh in the drivers' standings.

== Rally results ==
=== French Junior (F) Championship results ===
Year	Entrant	Car	1	2	3	4	5	6	7	Pos.	Points
2017	Adrien Fourmaux	Ford Fiesta R2T	LYO; 5	LIM; 4	LAN; Ret	LOZ; 5	CAR; 2	CÉV; Ret		3rd	50
2018	Adrien Fourmaux	Ford Fiesta R2T	LET; 1	ANT; 1	VOS; 1	LAN; 1	LOZ; 1	COE	CAR	1st	100

=== WRC results ===
Year	Entrant	Car	1	2	3	4	5	6	7	8	9	10	11	12	13	14	WDC	Points
2019	Adrien Fourmaux	Ford Fiesta R5	MON; 10			FRA; 30	ARG	CHL	POR; 13			GER; 23	TUR	GBR; 15			28th	1
2019	Adrien Fourmaux	Ford Fiesta R2		SWE; 45	MEX					ITA; 36	FIN; 23						28th	1
2019	Adrien Fourmaux	Ford Fiesta R5 Mk. II													ESP; 32	AUS; C	28th	1
2020	M-Sport Ford WRT	Ford Fiesta R5 Mk. II	MON; 15	SWE; 18	MEX	EST; 13	TUR; 9	ITA; Ret	MNZ; 49								22nd	2
2021	M-Sport Ford WRT	Ford Fiesta R5 Mk. II	MON; 9	ARC; 48			ITA; 30		EST; 12								10th	42
2021	M-Sport Ford WRT	Ford Fiesta WRC			CRO; 5	POR; 6		KEN; 5		BEL; Ret	GRE; 7	FIN; 7	ESP; 16	MNZ; 55			10th	42
2022	M-Sport Ford WRT	Ford Puma Rally1	MON; Ret	SWE; Ret	CRO; Ret	POR; 9	ITA; Ret	KEN; 13	EST; 7	FIN; 18	BEL; Ret	GRE; WD	NZL; WD	ESP; 8	JPN; WD		16th	13
2023	M-Sport Ford WRT	Ford Fiesta Rally2	MON; 13	SWE	MEX; 16	CRO; 12	POR; 15	ITA; Ret	KEN	EST	FIN; 8	GRE; 11	CHL	EUR; 8			20th	8
2023	M-Sport Ford WRT	Ford Puma Rally1													JPN; Ret		20th	8
2024	M-Sport Ford WRT	Ford Puma Rally1	MON; 5	SWE; 3	KEN; 3	CRO; 17	POR; 4	ITA; 14	POL; 3	LAT; 4	FIN; 3	GRE; 21	CHL; 5	EUR; 32	JPN; 3		5th	162
2025	Hyundai Shell Mobis WRT	Hyundai i20 N Rally1	MON; 3	SWE; 40	KEN; 16	ESP; 5	POR; Ret	ITA; 20	GRE; 3	EST; 5	FIN; Ret	PAR; Ret	CHL; 3	EUR; 5	JPN; Ret	SAU; 2	7th	115
2026	Hyundai Shell Mobis WRT	Hyundai i20 N Rally1	MON; 4	SWE; 5	KEN; 2	CRO; 30	ESP; 5	POR; 4	JPN; 5	GRE; 7	EST; 3	FIN; 4	PAR; 3	CHL; 3	ITA; 4		5th	183

* Season still in progress.

=== WRC-2 results ===
Year	Entrant	Car	1	2	3	4	5	6	7	8	9	10	11	12	13	14	WDC	Points
2019	Adrien Fourmaux	Ford Fiesta R5	MON; 2	SWE	MEX	FRA; 9	ARG	CHL	POR	ITA	FIN	GER; 8	TUR	GBR; 3			13th	39
2019	Adrien Fourmaux	Ford Fiesta R5 Mk. II													ESP; 13	AUS; C	13th	39
2020	M-Sport Ford WRT	Ford Fiesta R5 Mk. II	MON; 2	SWE; 4	MEX	EST; 2	TUR; 2	ITA; Ret	MNZ; 4								3rd	78
2021	M-Sport Ford WRT	Ford Fiesta R5 Mk. II	MON; 2	ARC; 9	CRO	POR	ITA; 6	KEN	EST; 4	BEL	GRE	FIN	ESP	MNZ			10th	48
2023	M-Sport Ford WRT	Ford Fiesta Rally2	MON; 5	SWE	MEX; 7	CRO; 4	POR; 10	ITA; Ret	KEN	EST	FIN; 2	GRE; 4	CHL	EUR; NC	JPN		8th	67

=== ERC results ===
Year	Entrant	Car	1	2	3	4	5	WDC	Points
2020	M-Sport Ford WRT	Ford Fiesta R5 Mk. II	ITA; Ret	LAT	PRT	HUN	ESP; 1	10th	37
