= Thierry Neuville =

Belgian rally driver (born 1988)

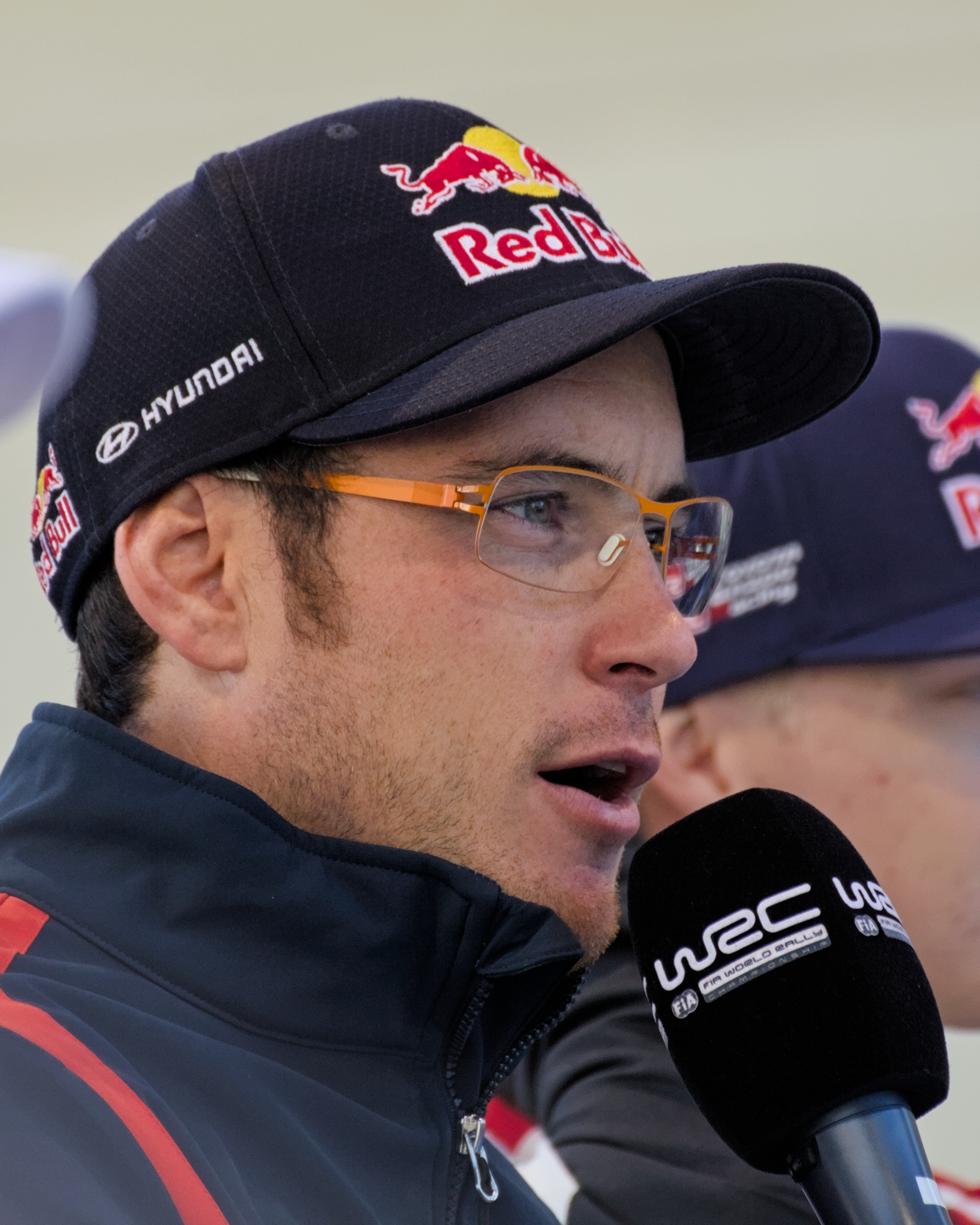
- Neuville at the 2023 Central European Rally

Personal information
- Nationality: (Belgium) Belgian
- Full name: Thierry Jean Neuville
- Born: 16 June 1988 (age 38); St. Vith, Belgium

World Rally Championship record
- Years active: 2009–2010, 2012–present
- Co-driver: (France) Nicolas Klinger (Belgium) Nicolas Gilsoul (Belgium) Martijn Wydaeghe
- Teams: Citroën Junior (2012); Qatar (2012–2013); Hyundai (2014–present)
- Rallies: 195
- Championships: 1 (2024)
- Rally wins: 23
- Podiums: 76
- Stage wins: 450
- Total points: 2435
- First rally: 2009 Rally Catalunya
- First win: 2014 Rallye Deutschland
- Last win: 2026 Rally de Portugal
- Last rally: 2026 Rally Italia Sardegna

Thierry Jean Neuville (French pronunciation: [tjɛʁi ʒɑ̃ nøvil], German pronunciation: [tjɛˈʁi ˈʒɑ̃ː ˈnøːvɪl]; born 16 June 1988) is a Belgian rally driver who is competing in the World Rally Championship for Hyundai Motorsport. During his career, he has finished as runner-up five times (2013, 2016–2019) and achieved his maiden drivers' world title in 2024, making him the first Belgian to win the driver's championship. He helped Hyundai win their first manufacturers' title in 2019, as well as repeating the feat in 2020. His current co-driver is compatriot Martijn Wydaeghe.

Born in St. Vith, Neuville started rallying in 2007. Between 2009 and 2011 he competed in the Intercontinental Rally Challenge; in 2009 he also made his World Rally Championship debut at the Rally Catalunya and in 2010 he competed in the Junior World Rally Championship. With promising results across the categories between 2009 and 2011, he was signed by the Citroën Junior Team and made his World Rally Car debut in 2012. In 2013, driving for the Qatar World Rally Team, he was a surprise runner-up in the championship, having scored his first podiums in the sport, finishing 114 points behind Sébastien Ogier.

When Hyundai Motorsport re-entered the sport in 2014, the Korean manufacturer signed Neuville as their lead driver. Neuville won his first World Rally Championship event, as well as Hyundai's first, at the 2014 Rallye Deutschland. In addition to his first victory, he had aided Hyundai score their first podium earlier in the season. Neuville finished the 2014 and 2015 seasons in sixth place, but finished runner-up in the drivers' championship from 2016 to 2019. In 2016, he was again a distant second to Ogier, but since new regulations for World Rally Cars were introduced in 2017 he has been battling closely for the drivers' title with rivals Ogier and Ott Tänak. In 2017 and 2018, he narrowly missed out on the title to Ogier, while in 2019 he was second to Tänak. Despite being second in the drivers' championship in 2019, Neuville's results helped Hyundai win their first manufacturers' title.

In total, Neuville has won 22 world rallies, all for Hyundai. Initially known as an asphalt specialist, he has won events on asphalt and gravel. He has also won on snow, winning the Rally Sweden in 2018 and he became one of the few non-Nordic drivers to win the event. In addition to rallying, Neuville has also contested circuit racing, debuting in the 2019 ADAC TCR Germany Touring Car Championship.

== Rally career ==
=== Early career ===
Neuville was born in the German-speaking municipality St. Vith. He drove his first rally when he was 19 years of age, in 2007, his debut rally car was an Opel Corsa he piloted on an event in Luxembourg. In 2008, he was the winner of the Royal Automobil Club of Belgium Rally Contest, which initiated his rally career. The following year, he won the Citroën Rally Trophy Belux, in a Citroën C2 R2 Max.

Neuville made his Intercontinental Rally Challenge debut in 2009 when he was handed a drive at the 2009 Ypres Rally by the BF Goodrich Drivers Team in a Peugeot 207 S2000. He crashed out of the rally while lying fourth.

For the 2008 Rally Finland, Neuville was entered in a Ford Fiesta ST and would have made his WRC debut, but he did not start the event. Instead, he made his WRC debut at the 2009 Rally Catalunya with a Citroën C2 R2 with Nicolas Klinger as his co-driver, an event he eventually would retire in.

=== Private career (2010–11) ===
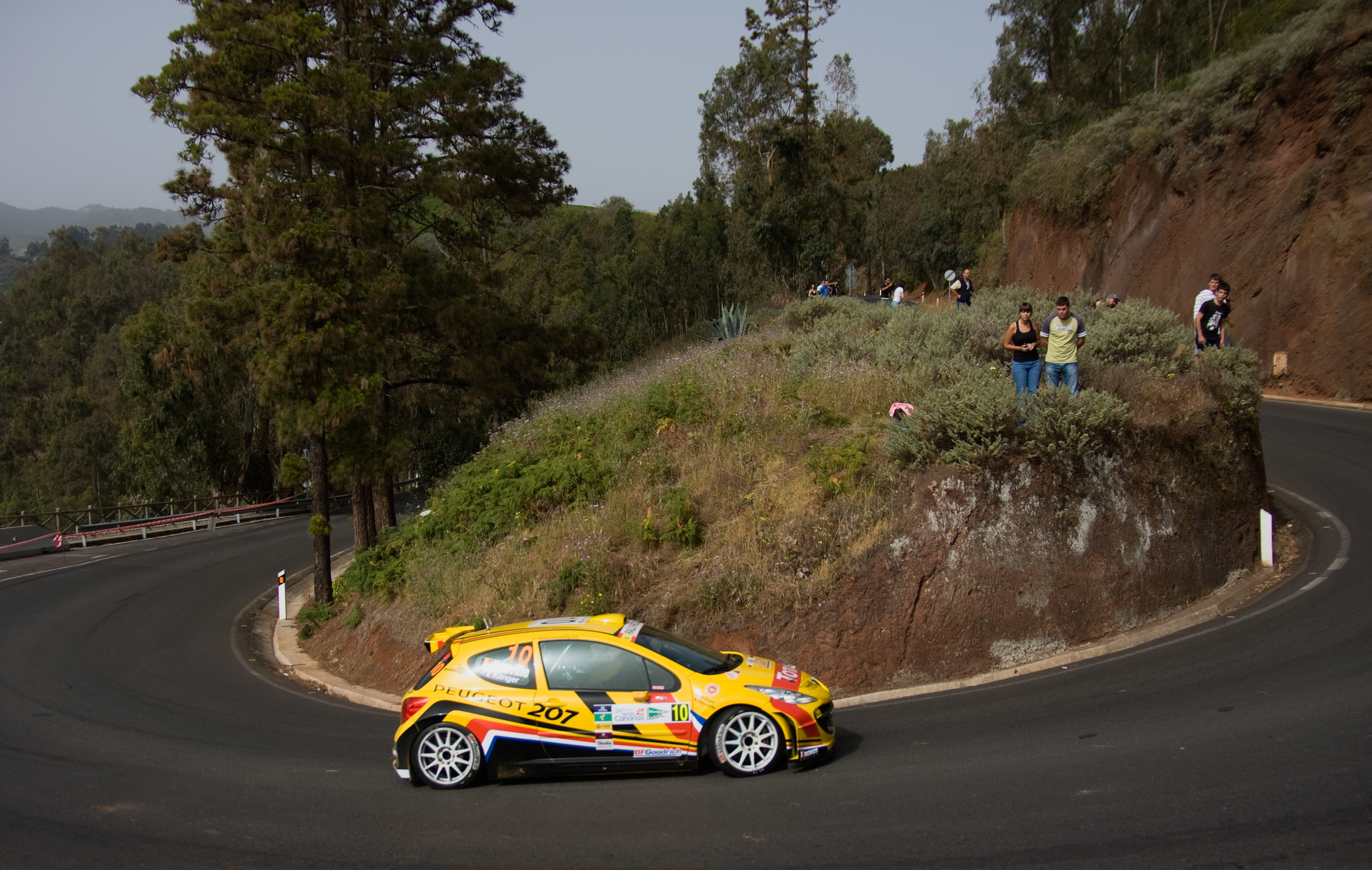
Neuville at the 2010 Rally Islas Canarias driving a Peugeot 207 S2000.

==== 2010 ====
Neuville drove a self-entered Citroën C2 S1600 in five of the six rounds of 2010 Junior World Rally Championship, alongside Klinger. In the two opening rounds, on gravel, 2010 Rally of Turkey and 2010 Rally de Portugal, Neuville retired in both events while leading the category, in Turkey it was due to a mechanical fault while in Portugal he crashed out. It was not until the third round in 2010 Rally Bulgaria, on asphalt, Neuville won his first event in the category. Retirement followed in the next event in Germany after an engine failure. His final event of the campaign was the 2010 Rallye de France where he was third in the category. Despite leading many of the events, along with many stage wins, of the season, Neuville would finish the championship in seventh position, due to the many retirements.

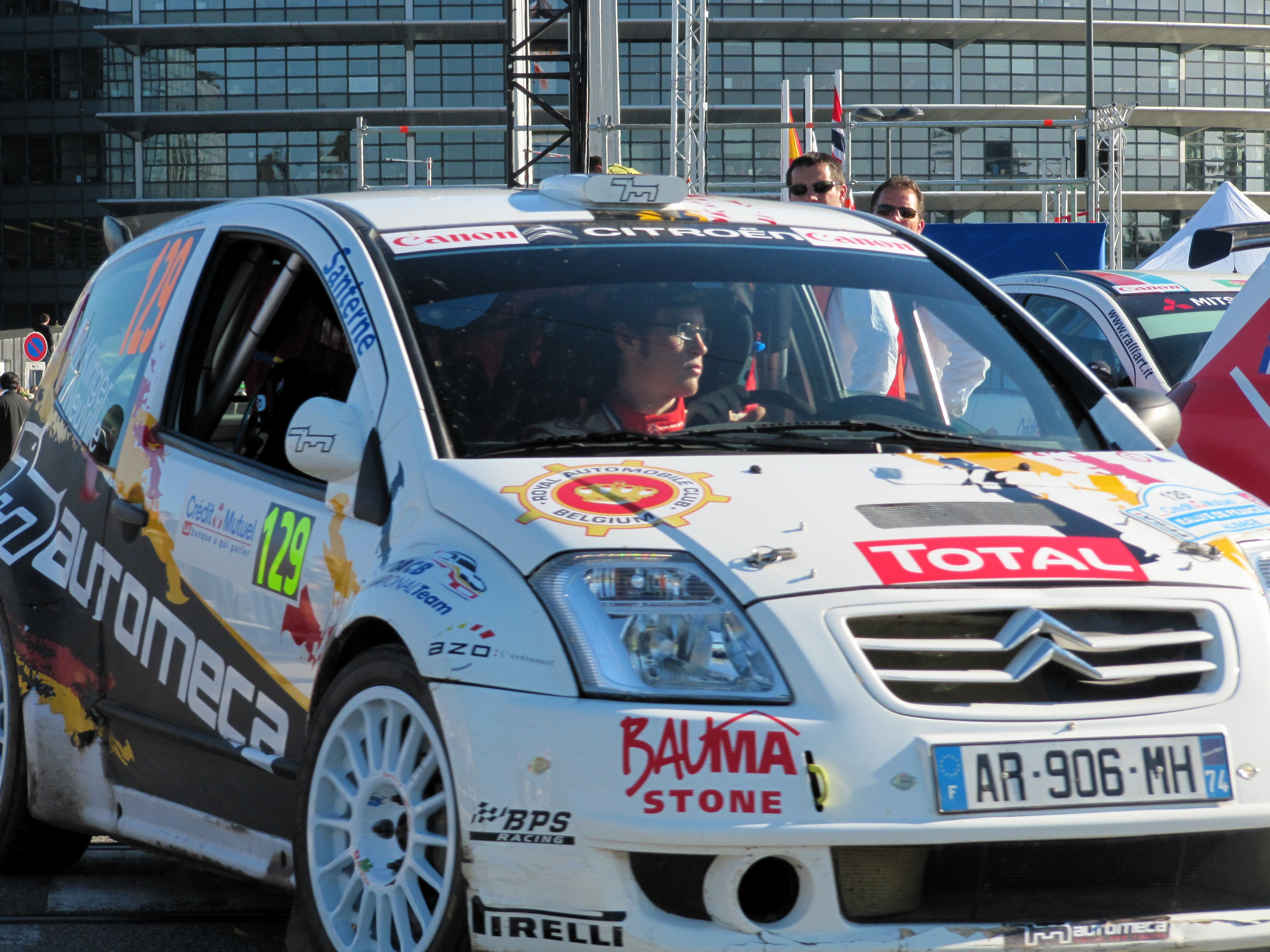
Neuville at the 2010 Rallye de France.

The same year, Neuville, with Klinger as co-driver, was signed to drive a Peugeot 207 S2000 at six events in the 2010 Intercontinental Rally Challenge for Peugeot Belgium-Luxembourg (Bel-Lux), a team supported by Kronos Racing. His first event was the 2010 Rally Islas Canarias, where he retired due to suspension damage while running in seventh position. Having so far only contested asphalt rallies in the 207 S2000, he contested his first gravel rally in the car, at the 2010 Rally d'Italia Sardegna, where he secured fourth. He was a career-best third at his country event, the 2010 Ypres Rally. His final three events for the season were the 2010 Czech Rally, 2010 Rallye Sanremo and 2010 Rally Scotland. He retired in the Czech and Scottish rallies. In Sanremo, he was eighth, securing the final points position. Neuville finished the season in ninth place, collecting twelve points across his six events.

==== 2011 ====
Neuville continued with the Peugeot Bel-Lux team in the 2011 Intercontinental Rally Challenge. At the season opener in Monte Carlo he crashed his 207 S2000 in the first stage and retired. After Monte Carlo, co-driver Klinger was replaced with Nicolas Gilsoul for the rest of the season. In the next event, 2011 Rally Islas Canarias, Neuville battled for the win but finished third behind winner Juho Hänninen and second placed Jan Kopecký. First victory came in the following at event in 2011 Tour de Corse with a convincing drive, finishing 15.5 seconds in front of Kopecký. He was the early pacesetter at the following 2011 Prime Yalta Rally but going off-road and a puncture meant the Belgian could only finish in sixth position. At the 2011 Ypres Rally, suspension damage resulted in retirement. At the following 2011 Czech Rally, Neuville was fourth. In Hungary, the 2011 Mecsek Rallye, Neuville was just 0.8 seconds shy of winning the rally, behind winner Kopecký. His second victory would arrive in 2011 Rallye Sanremo, winning by just 1.5 seconds. In the penultimate round in Scotland, Neuville was sixth, having spun and dropped time to the leaders. Heading into the finale in Cyprus, Neuville was one of five drivers who were able to win the title. Neuville held the rally lead early on, but soon after, an issue with the alternator on his car developed and the Belgian had to retire. The title eventually went to Andreas Mikkelsen, who won the rally, while Neuville finished fifth in the standings.

=== Citroën Junior (2012) ===
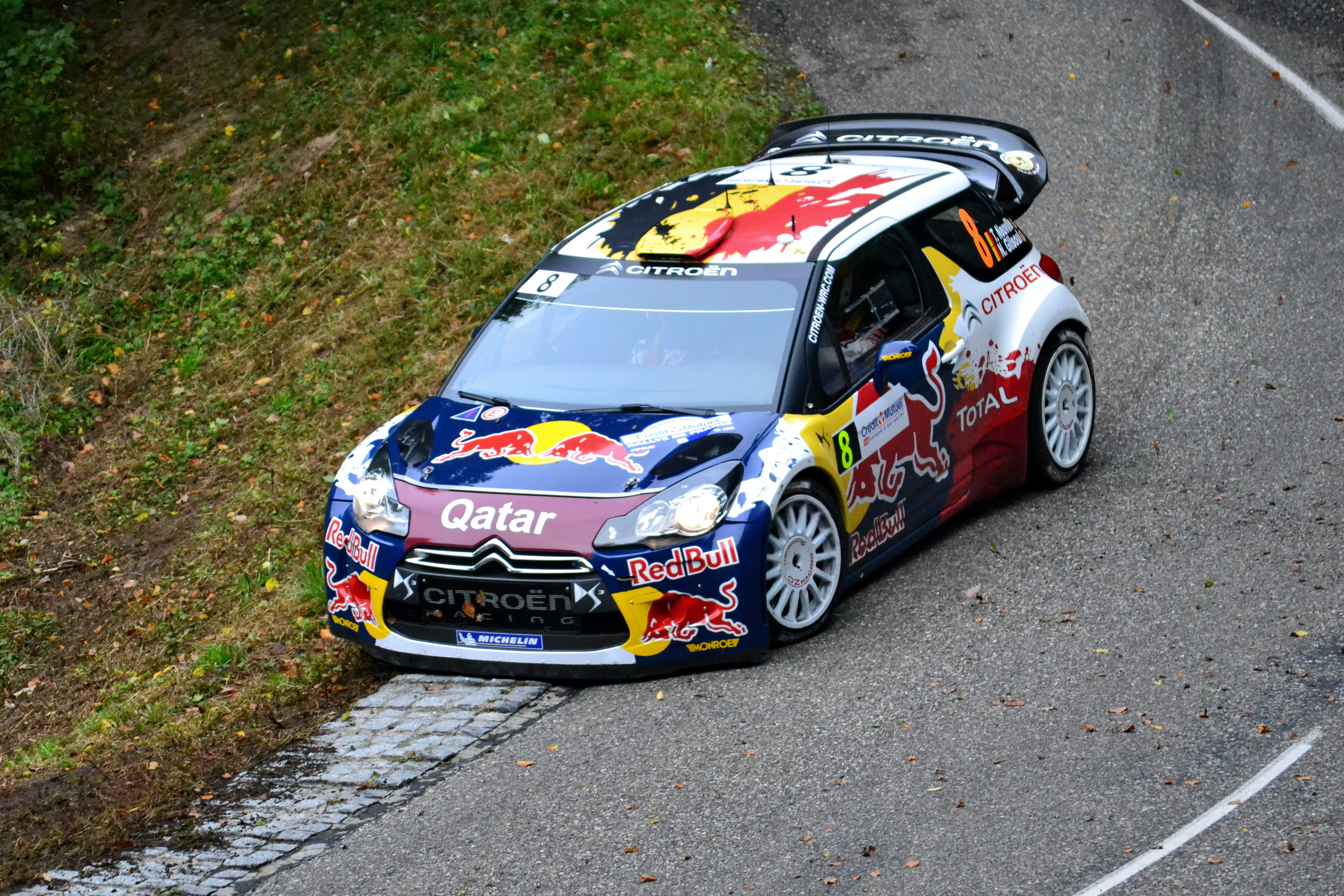
Neuville driving a Citroën DS3 WRC at the 2012 Rallye de France.

Citroën signed Neuville for the 2012 World Rally Championship, driving selected races in a Citroën DS3 WRC for their junior team. The season saw Neuville make his World Rally Car-debut. At the season opener in Monte Carlo, Neuville crashed out of the event early. He remained scoreless until the fourth round in Portugal where he finished in eight position. Prior to Portugal, he had won his first stage win in Mexico. In Argentina, he was fifth, despite rolling his car early in the event. Neuville's results had so far been plagued by the use of Rally 2-rules, his first error-free event was in Acropolis where he was sixth. Neuville's season did not include New Zealand with the Citroën Junior Team, but as Nasser Al-Attiyah in the Qatar World Rally Team was injured and unable to compete, Neuville replaced him for the Qatari team in the event. He was battling for fifth place with fellow World Rally Car-rookie Ott Tänak, with Neuville eventually securing the position due to Tänak retiring. He scored no points in Finland after crashing from sixth place. He was running close of a podium finish in the following event in Germany, but, like in Finland, he was outside the points due to a crash. He returned to the points by finishing seventh in Wales. His best result of the season came in France, where he led a World Rally-event for the first time in his career and eventually finished fourth, after many stage wins. Another outing for the Qatar team in Sardinia, the penultimate event of the season, meant Neuville contested the full season. He was outside the points in Sardinia, as well as in Catalunya, the final event of the season, due to incidents on both rallies. He finished the season in seventh position.

=== Qatar (2013) ===
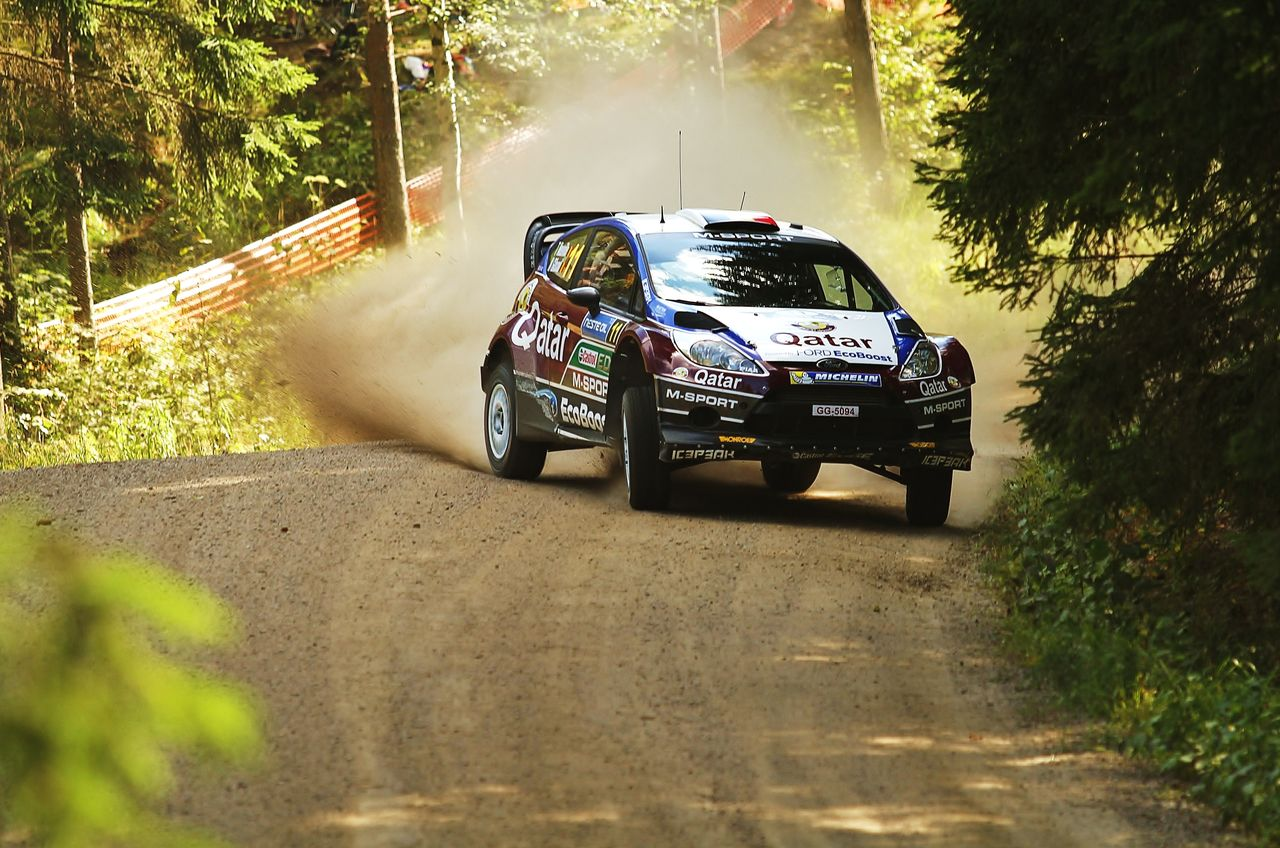
Neuville en route to second place at the 2013 Rally Finland.

Neuville joined Qatar for the 2013 season, now driving a Ford Fiesta RS WRC. He retired for the third time in Rallye Monte-Carlo, after going off track on the third stage. In Rally Sweden, he got off the mark by scoring a fifth place on a surface he lacked experience on. Then, in Mexico, he was one of the men of the rally, getting his maiden podium finish (third place). Round four, Portugal, was disappointing, since he finished out of the points, after returning to the rally in Rally 2 after retiring from fifth place. Fifth place was again for Neuville, in Argentina. Then came a streak of podiums which turned Neuville into the surprise driver of the season: third place in Greece and second place in Italy, Finland, Germany and Australia.

At Rallye Deutschland, which Neuville considers his home rally, the Belgian was in second place during the second day, trailing Jari-Matti Latvala just for a few seconds. But in a surprise twist, Latvala left the road and Neuville did the same thing right after him. Neuville led the rally for a stage, but eventually, and in the second to last stage of the day, he lost the lead to Dani Sordo. The next stage of the day was cancelled, so the drivers entered the final two stages separated by just eight tenths of a second. The penultimate stage was won by Sordo, which left the Spaniard three seconds ahead of Neuville in the overall classification. Both gave everything in the PowerStage and Neuville eventually had a small off in the very last section of the stage, therefore losing the chance to win. He ended in second place, 53.0 seconds behind Sordo.

At Rally Australia, Neuville was in third place, 25.2 seconds behind Mikko Hirvonen, before the PowerStage. With Sébastien Ogier comfortably in the lead, he needed to finish in second place overall and in the PowerStage in order to still have a mathematical chance at the title. Hirvonen punctured in the stage, allowing Thierry to finish in second overall and second in the PowerStage. After this dramatic finish, a frustrated Ogier and Neuville were the only ones still with a chance for the title, although Ogier only needed to score a single point in the remaining three rounds. Ogier eventually secured the title in the next rally in Alsace by taking a point on the Power stage, which ran as the opening stage of the rally. A podium for Neuville in the last rally of the season in Wales secured his spot as second in the championship, ahead of Latvala.

=== Hyundai (2014–present) ===
==== 2014 ====
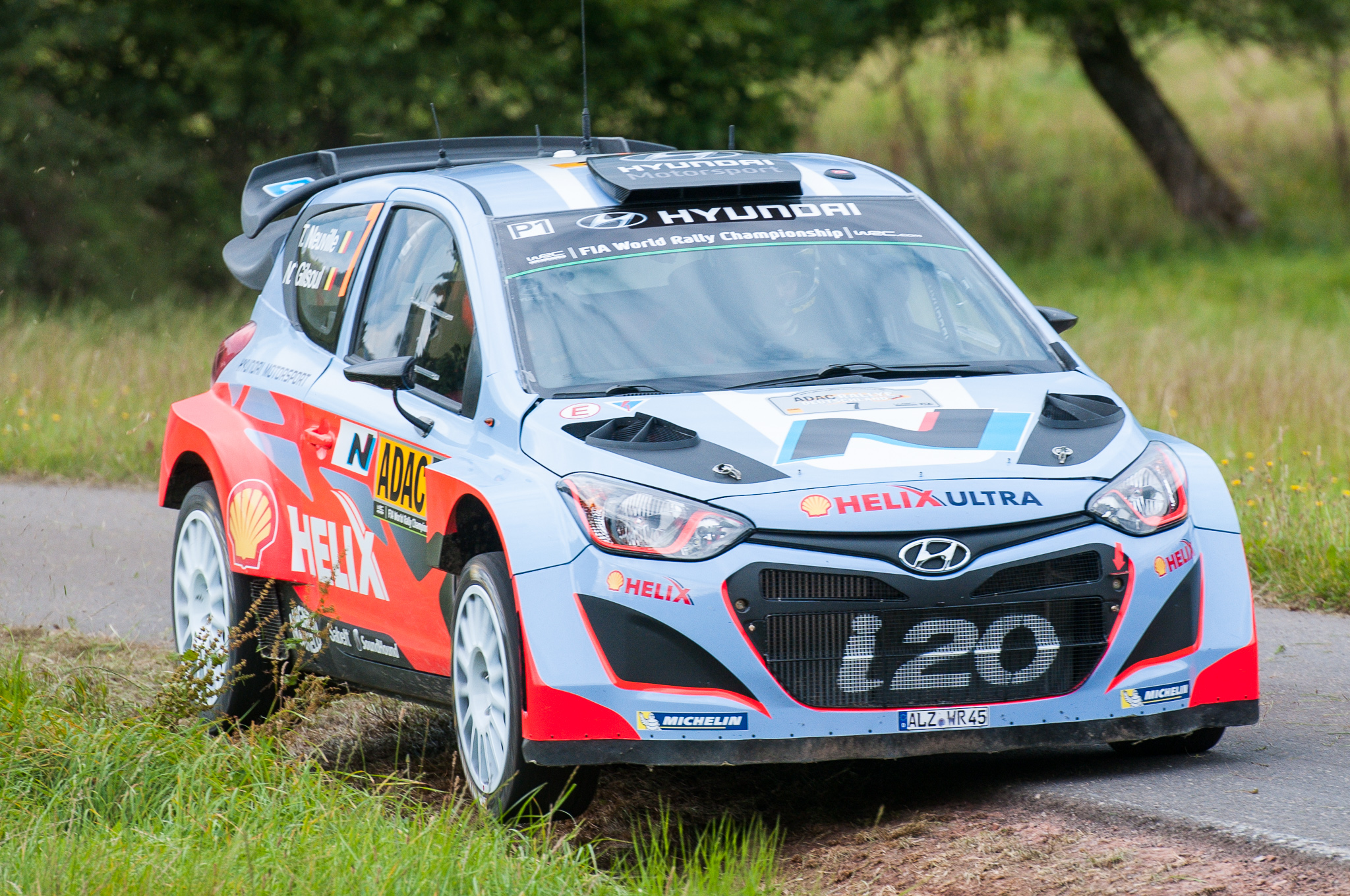
Neuville at the 2014 Rallye Deutschland.

On 5 November 2013, Hyundai Motorsport GmbH confirmed it had signed Neuville on a multi-year deal to lead its entry into the WRC from 2014. After the halfway point of the 2014 season Neuville had scored two podiums for Hyundai and ran sixth in the overall standings.

Neuville rolled six times during the shakedown of the ADAC Rally of Germany, stopping in the vineyards. The car was repaired and Thierry Neuville and co-driver Nicolas Gilsoul finished the rally in first position. That was Neuville and Hyundai Motorsport GmbH's maiden win in the WRC. Previous year's winner Dani Sordo, who was now his teammate, finished second, so it was not just Hyundai's first win, but also a double victory.

==== 2015 ====
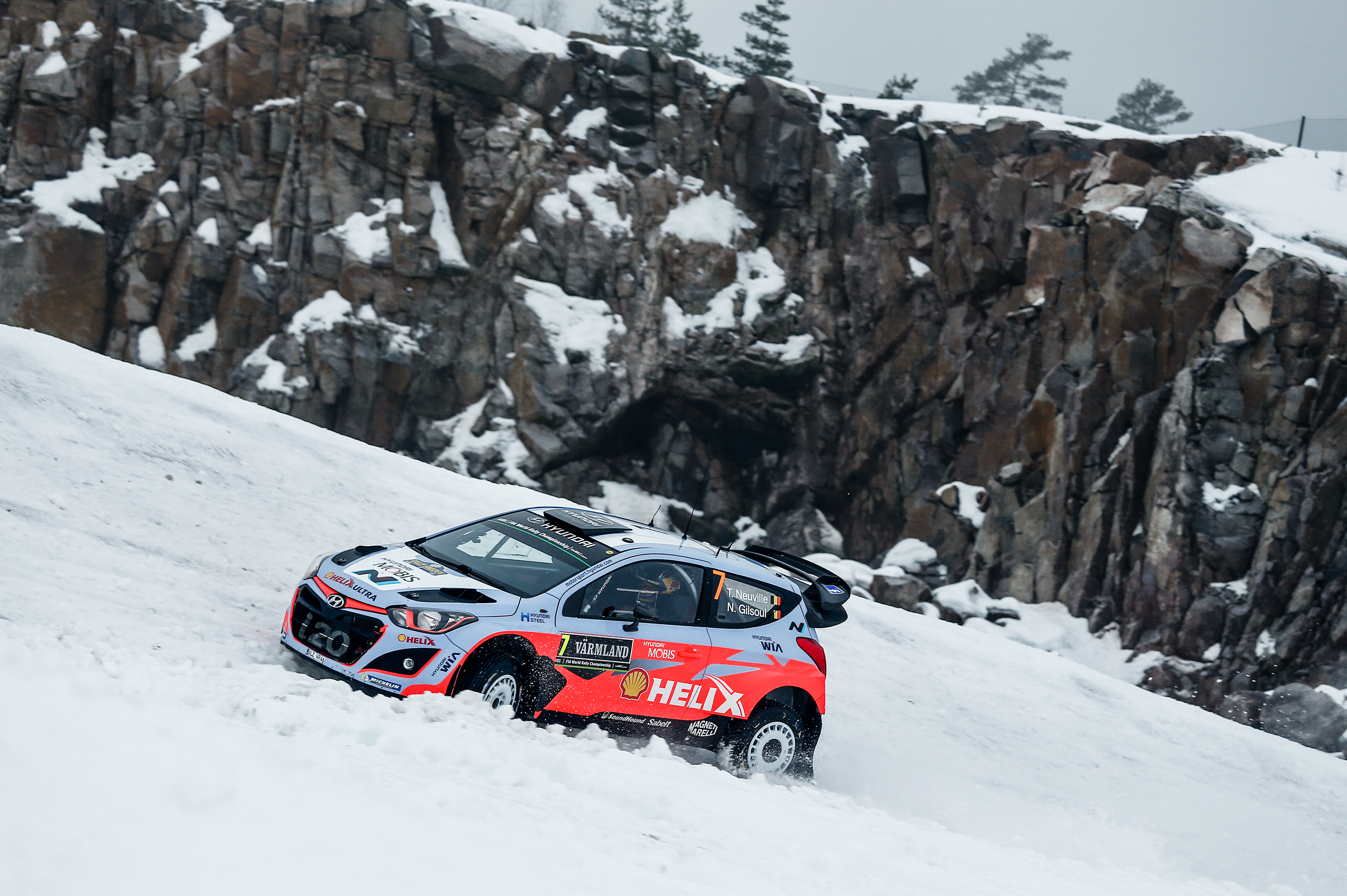
Neuville at the 2015 Rally Sweden where he finished second.

Neuville started the 2015 season strongly, finishing fifth and second in Monte Carlo and Sweden respectively. He finished eighth in the third round in Mexico but had been battling for lead with Ogier during the first day before going off the road.

The remaining events of the season were disappointing for Neuville. After a crash on the last stage of Rally Argentina, his confidence took a knock and he could only manage one more podium, which came in Italy. His teammates, Sordo and Hayden Paddon, outperformed Neuville during the last events of the season but he still managed to finish above them in the standings. He finished the season in sixth place.

==== 2016 ====
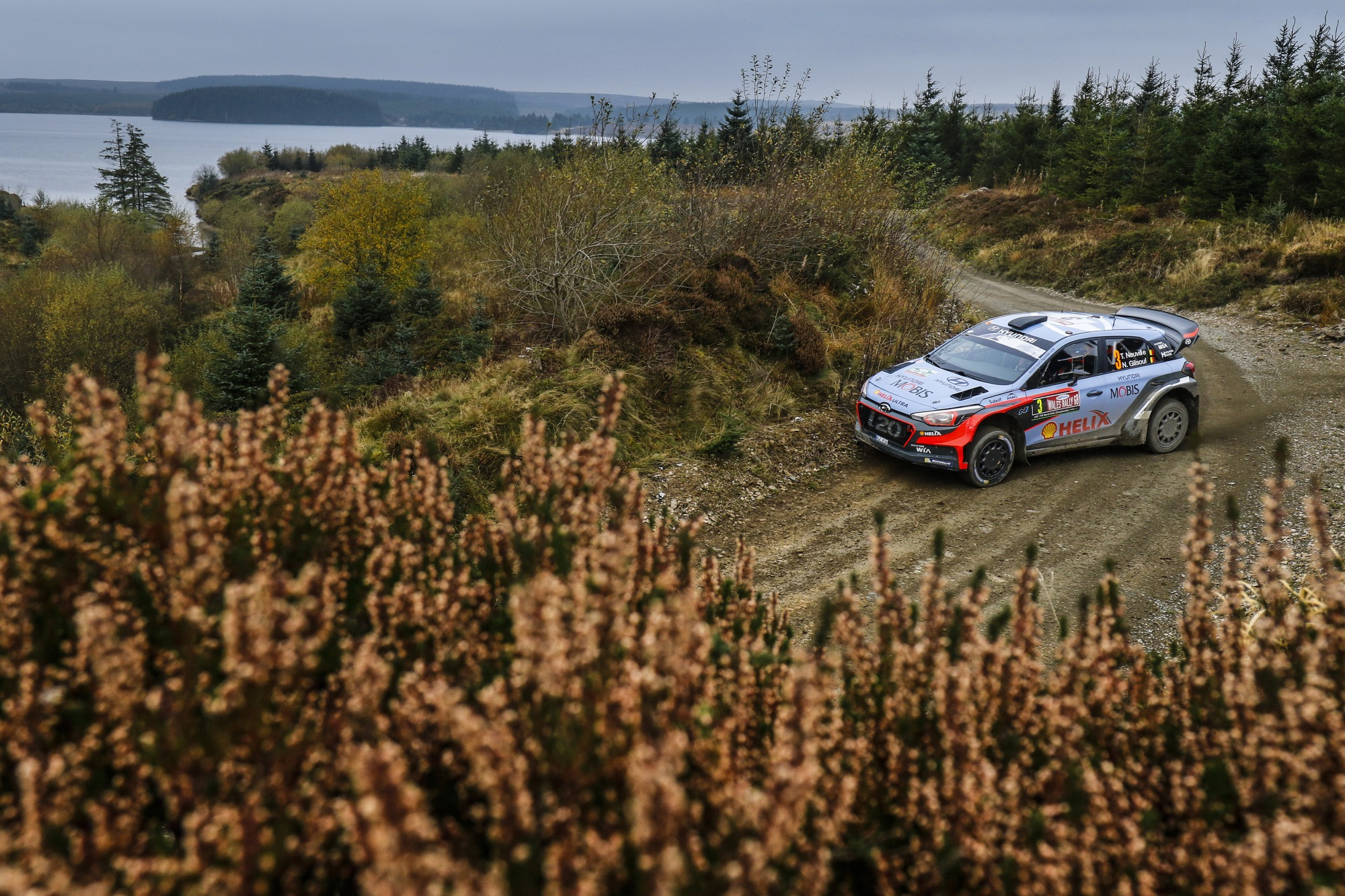
Neuville at the 2016 Wales Rally GB.

The 2016 season started with a podium in Monte Carlo, as Neuville finished third with a new rendition of the i20. But the podium was followed by a mechanical issue in Sweden and crashing out in Mexico, meaning he would score no points in those events. In Portugal, while lying fifth, he ran out of fuel while on a stage caused by a miscalculation by Hyundai and his car ended up stranded.

But in Sardinia, Neuville was back in form. By winning nine of the 19 stages, he won the rally and finished roughly 25 seconds ahead of a pushing Jari-Matti Latvala. After the rally, Neuville paid tribute to his former mentors, Philippe Bugalski and Jean-Pierre Mondron. Bugalski, who died in 2012, was born on the same date Neuville won the rally, while Mondron had died two weeks before the rally.

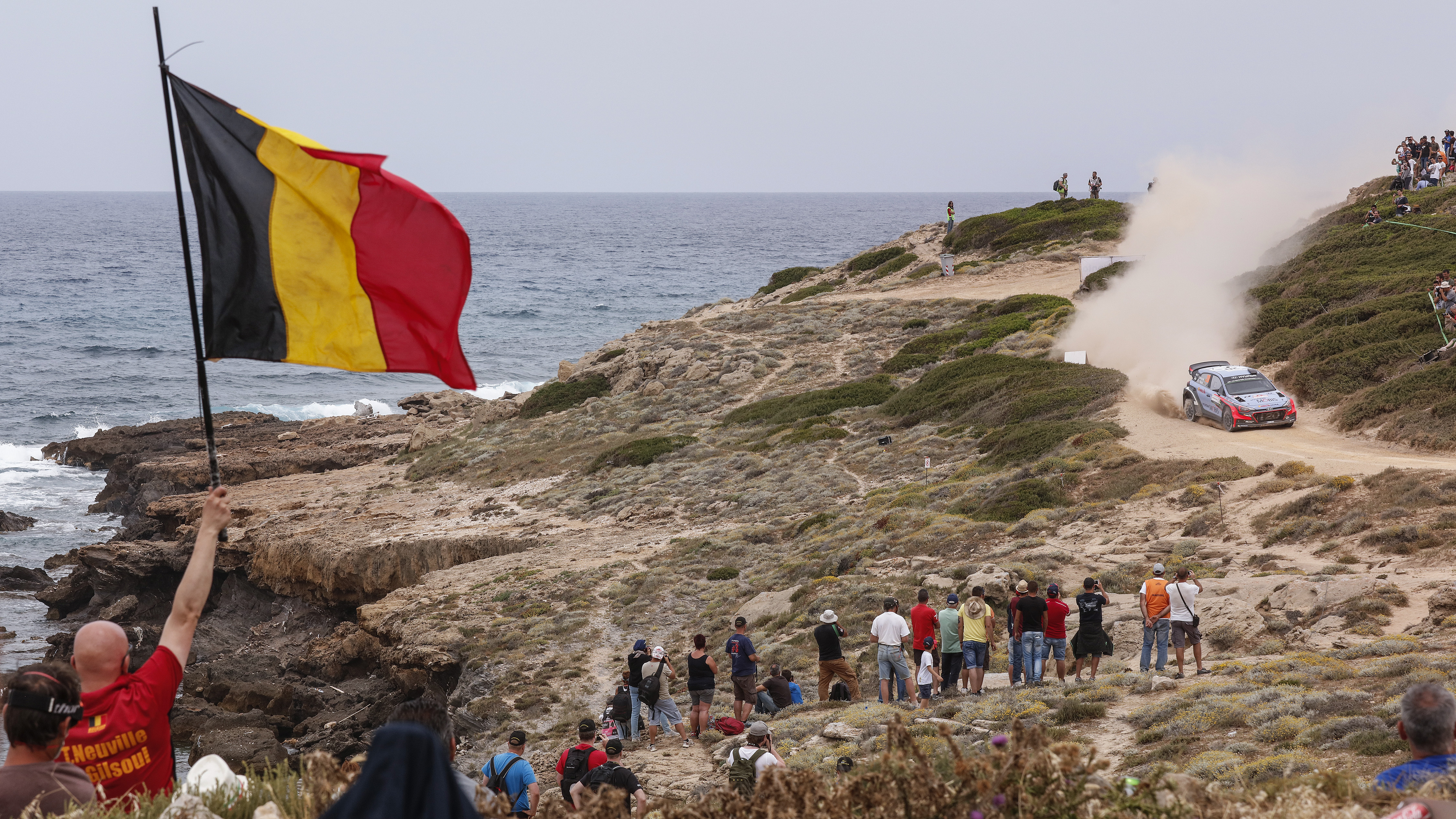
Neuville on a stage at the 2016 Rally Sardinia.

On 5 October, it was confirmed Neuville would extend his deal with Hyundai until the end of 2018. Despite rumours suggesting him considering other options, he decided to stay with the Alzenau-based team for 2017 and 2018 when new regulations for the competing cars would enter.

Neuville finished the season with five podiums out of the last five events, securing the position as runner up in the championship with 160 points.

==== 2017 ====
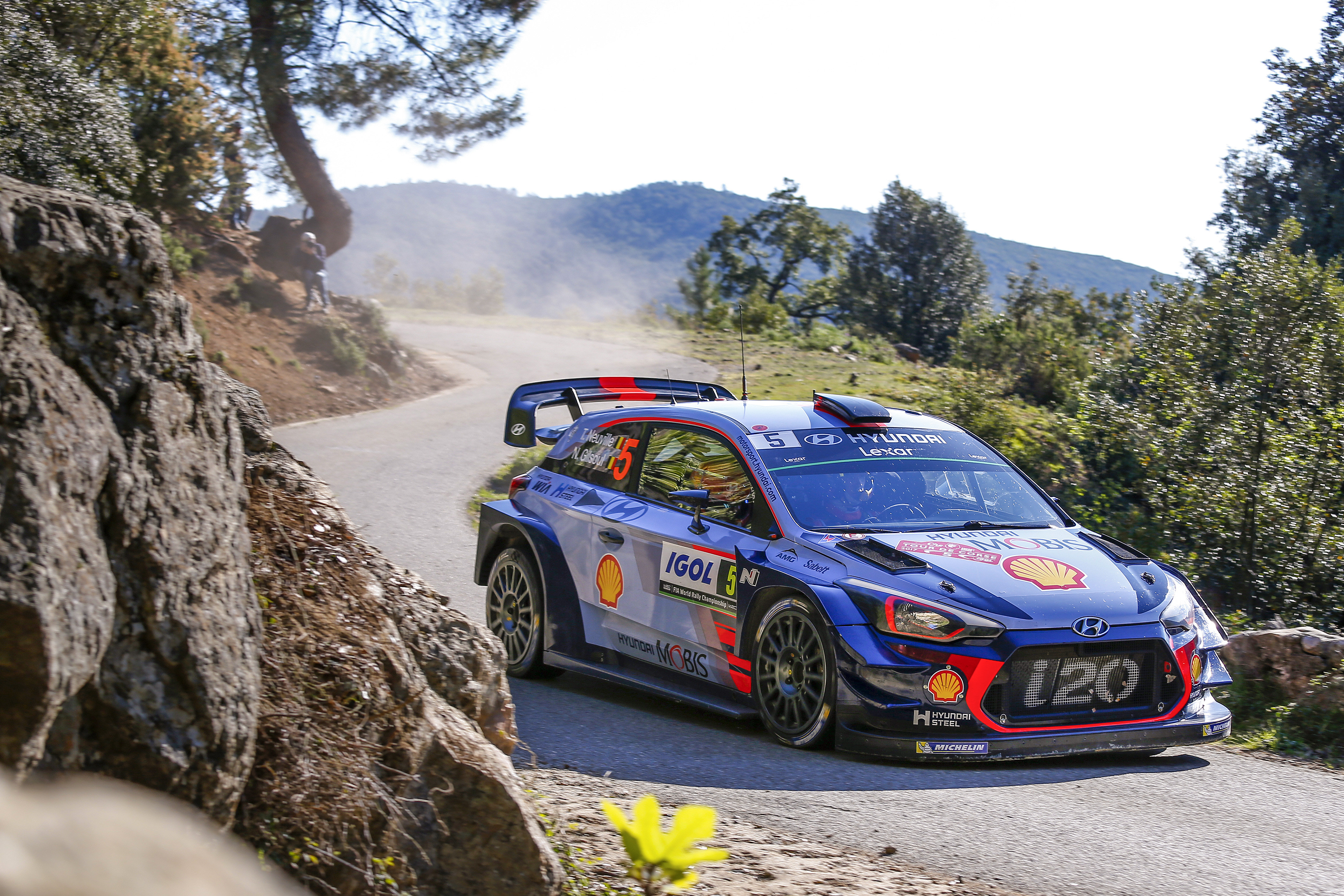
Neuville won the 2017 Tour de Corse, his first rally victory of the 2017 season.

In 2017, Neuville and his teammates Paddon and Sordo started with yet another new version of the i20, the i20 Coupe.

The season however started badly for the Belgian, finishing the first two rallies in 15th and 13th, having led both rallies before crashing. He finished the power stages in both rallies in first and third, still scoring eight points. After finishing the Rally Mexico in third place Neuville won the Tour de Corse and the Rally Argentina, becoming a world championship contender against Sébastien Ogier. In Portugal, both fought for the victory and Ogier won. Then, in Sardinia, where he had won in the previous season, Neuville only finished third, however, ahead of Ogier who finished fifth. His next victory came in Poland, and then, in Finland, Neuville only finished sixth, however, after his arch rival Ogier retired, it was enough for Neuville to take the championship lead for the first time in his career.

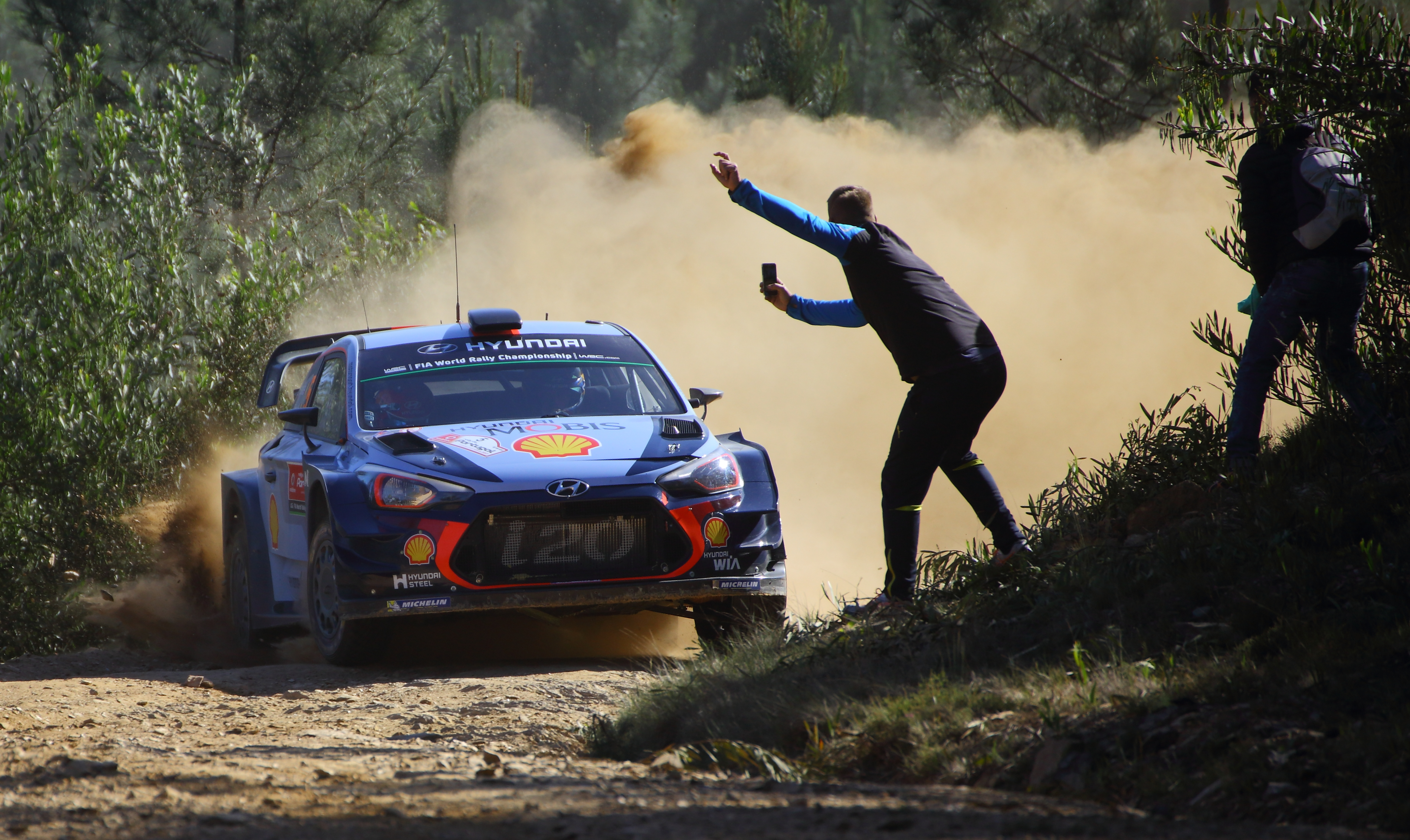
Neuville and the Hyundai i20 Coupe WRC at the 2017 Rally de Portugal.

Heading into the 2017 Rallye Deutschland, Neuville's goal was to retain the championship lead. However, a small impact on the first stage of the second day was enough to damage suspension and transmission of his car which resulted in having to retire from the day. Neuville was third before the accident and in front of Ogier who was fourth after the first day. He aimed to salvage points on the Power stage but could only manage sixth fastest, meaning he would score no points for the first time in 2017. Ogier retook the championship after finishing third and opened a 17-point lead over Neuville. Lightning then struck twice for the Belgian, as a lackluster performance in Spain ended when he clipped a rock on stage 16 and broke the steering, leaving him pointless for the second rally in a row and dropping him to third in the standings behind Ott Tänak.

Neuville retook second place in the driver's standings in Wales, as he finished the rally in second position while Tänak finished sixth. Unable to match the pace set by rally winner Elfyn Evans, who used DMACK tyres, Neuville was the fastest of the drivers competing on Michelin. He finished ahead of Ogier, who was third, but the two extra points Ogier scored on the Power stage meant the Frenchman was crowned world champion for a fifth consecutive time.

At the final rally of the season in Australia, Neuville took his fourth win of the season. The event was characterized by changeable conditions but after initial leader Andreas Mikkelsen suffered a double puncture, Neuville held off Latvala who was his closest challenger for most of the rally, the Finn eventually crashed on the last stage. The win meant Neuville secured the runners-up spot in the standings for the third time in his career.

==== 2018 ====
Just as in 2017, Neuville's season started with a mistake at the season opener in Monte Carlo. On the first stage of the rally he lost control of his i20 and got stuck in a ditch, the excursion cost the Belgian four minutes and ruined his chance of a rally win. As the rally progressed, he fought his way up the standings and eventually finished fifth.

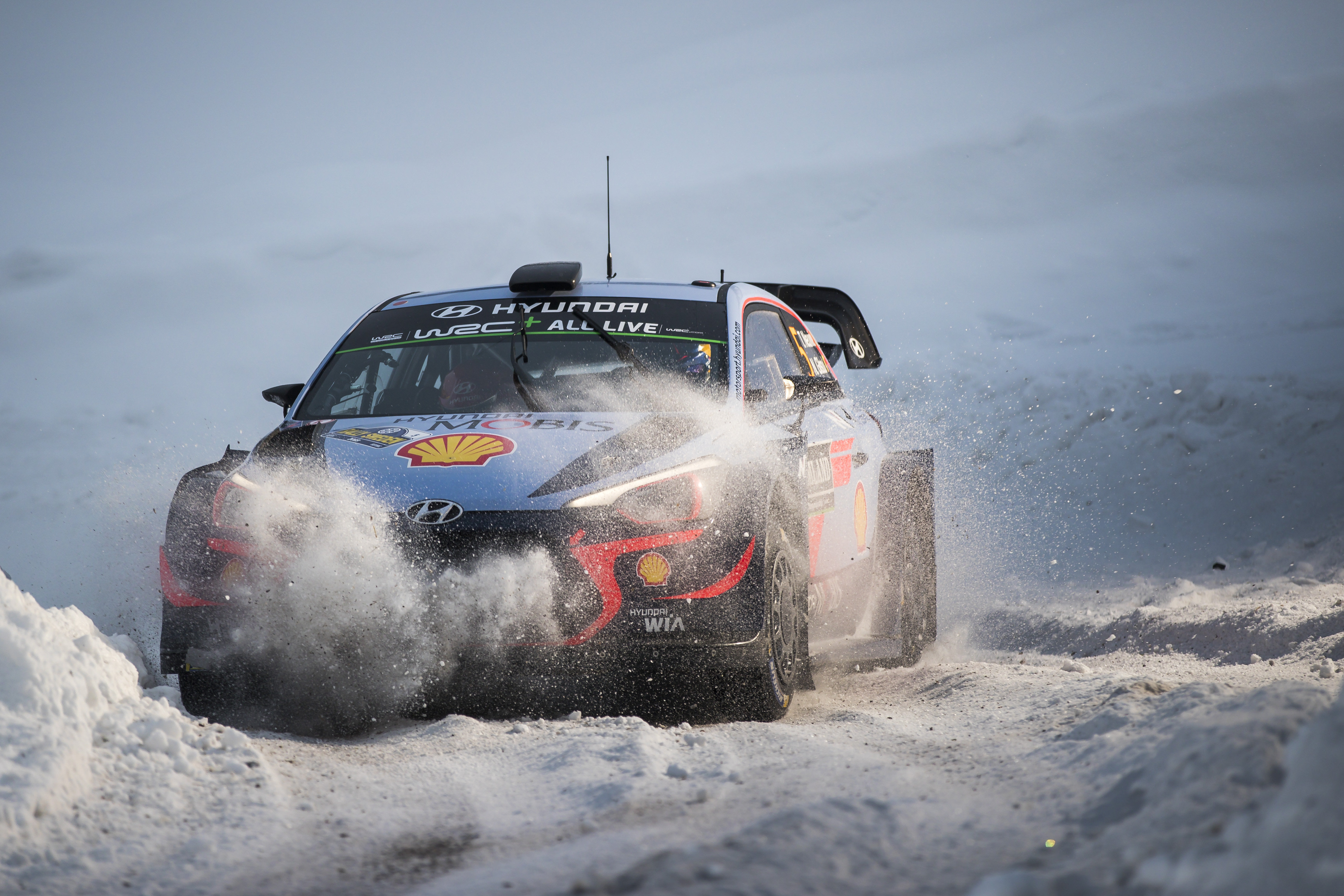
Neuville won the 2018 Rally Sweden.

In Rally Sweden, Neuville was the fifth on the road at the opening day, which meant he had more grips than the drivers who start ahead of him. That gave him a chance to fight for the victory. Eventually, he took his seventh win and first on the snow in the WRC, though he had an electrical glitch with his Hyundai's paddle shift gearchange system in Saturday morning and made a few small mistakes. After winning the rally, he led the championship by ten points, ahead of defending world champion, Sébastien Ogier. The win meant Neuville became the third non-Nordic driver to win the Swedish Rally.

The lead of the standings was short-lived, as Ogier won the next rounds in Mexico and Corsica. In Mexico, Neuville endured many technical issues with his i20 Coupe and achieved sixth as a result. While in Corsica, Ogier extended his lead in the championship further when Neuville finished behind him in third.

Neuville beat Ogier to the podium in Argentina when he finished second, but the rally was won by Tänak. After Tänak's mixed start to the season, the Estonian's win in Argentina meant Tänak had emerged as a title contender along with Neuville and Ogier.

In Portugal, Neuville secured his eight win in the WRC and inherited the lead of the championship when both title rivals Ogier and Tänak hit trouble and scored zero points. Along with four extra points from the Power stage, Neuville's victory lifted him to first place in the standings, 19 and 47 points clear of Ogier and Tänak, respectively. In the next event, Rally d'Italia Sardinia, Neuville won again. Ogier had led most of the Sardinian rally but Neuville eventually beat the Frenchman to the win on the very last stage with a margin of seven tenths of a second, equalling the third closest win in the WRC which was set by Neuville in Argentina, 2017.

Just before Rally Turkey, it was announced that Neuville, along with Gilsoul, had signed an extension with Hyundai to drive for the team until the end of 2021.

Neuville's advantage in the standings was reduced when his suspension broke in Turkey while he was leading, with Tänak eventually winning the event, and when he slid off the road in the next rally in Wales from second place. He lost the lead in the standings to Ogier when he finished fourth at the 2018 Rally Catalunya while Ogier was second, the result meant Ogier headed Neuville by three points in the championship.

Heading into the 2018 Rally Australia, Neuville, Ogier and Tänak had a chance to win the championship. Neuville punctured on the first day and dropped down to last place of the World Rally car drivers which meant he had to run first on the road on the second day. As a result of sweeping the loose gravel roads by running first, making up time proved to be difficult for the Belgian and he could not pass Ogier who was sixth, which was also enough for Ogier to secure the title if the rally was to end without any change of positions. On the final day, Neuville hit a tree and lost a wheel of his i20 Coupe and ultimately had to retire from the event, ending his title bid. Soon after Neuville's retirement, Tänak also damaged his car and had to retire which subsequently handed the title to Ogier. Neuville finished as runner up in the standings for a third consecutive time and his fourth time overall.

==== 2019 ====
Neuville battled with Ogier throughout the season opener in Monte Carlo and finished second, with Ogier taking the victory by a few seconds over the Belgian. He followed up the podium in Monte Carlo with another in Sweden, settling for the final podium position in a battle with Esapekka Lappi who was second, while rally was won by Tänak. Neuville could only manage fourth in the next event in Mexico while Ogier was victorious and Tänak finished second. His first victory of 2019 was achieved at the Tour de Corse, Elfyn Evans had been leading most of the rally but a puncture on the last stage dropped the Welshman to third and Neuville was able to win the event. After the Tour de Corse, Neuville, Ogier and Tänak were separated by five points in the standings. He was victorious at the next event in Argentina while Ogier was third and Tänak eighth. When the championship headed to Rally Chile for the first time, Neuville crashed heavily after misjudging a fast crest which saw the Belgian require medical assistance. Both Neuville and co-driver Gilsoul escaped major injuries from the accident. While he had to retire, the rally was won by Tänak and Ogier was second, Neuville dropped to third in the points standings. With no major injury sustained from the crash in Chile, Neuville contested the next event in Portugal and finished second behind Tänak.

Neuville did not score big points in the next couple of events, in Sardinia and Finland, when he finished both events in sixth place. Both title rivals, Tänak and Ogier, suffered from issues in Sardinia and also did not score well while the event was won by Neuville's teammate Dani Sordo. In Finland, Tänak won while Ogier was fifth, one position above Neuville, and the Estonian opened a 22-point lead in the standings. Since Tänak was pulling away in the title fight, Neuville needed to beat the Estonian in the next event in Germany. He was battling with the points leader through the first leg as the pair were closely matched the whole leg. Disaster struck on the second leg when Neuville had to change a puncture during a stage, a recovery drive afterwards saw Neuville finish fourth while Tänak could cruise to victory. He lost further ground in the title race in the following event in Turkey, as he rolled his car and could only finish eighth while Ogier won.

Tänak pulled further away when the Estonian won in Wales Rally GB while Neuville finished behind him in second. In Spain, the penultimate round, Neuville had to win and finish well above Tänak to prevent Tänak from securing the title. Neuville duly won the event, securing his twelfth win in the WRC. However, with Tänak finishing second, the 2019 World Rally Championship was won by Tänak after taking an unassailable lead in the standings. Heading into the final round in Australia, the battle for second place in the standings between Neuville and Ogier still had to be settled. When the round was cancelled after bushfires in Australia affecting the rally route, Neuville thereby finished second in the overall standings. Neuville's results over the season, along with his teammates', helped Hyundai win their first manufacturers' title.

==== 2020 ====
Neuville started his seventh season with Hyundai by winning the Monte Carlo Rally, battling with Ogier and Evans throughout the rally. However, he would drop the lead of the standings after a sixth-place finish in the following round in Sweden. Neuville would drop more points to Ogier and Evans due to not scoring in the next two events, Mexico and Estonia, due to mechanical troubles in both. In a shortened season due to the COVID-19 pandemic, Neuville was 37 points behind leader Ogier with three events remaining. He led most of the next event in Turkey but had to settle for second after Evans due to a puncture on the final day. He was second again in the next event in Sardinia, finishing second in a close podium behind winner Sordo and ahead of Ogier in third. In the finale in Monza Neuville would need to win and score maximum power stage points to be champion, while his rivals could not score big points. Instead, Neuville crashed out of the event early, while Ogier went on to win his seventh title. However, with Neuville's teammates Tänak and Sordo finishing in second and third, Hyundai was manufacturers champions for the second time. In the drivers championship, Neuville was fourth, ending his streak of finishing as the runner-up which begun in 2016.

==== 2021–2024: First World Rally Championship title ====
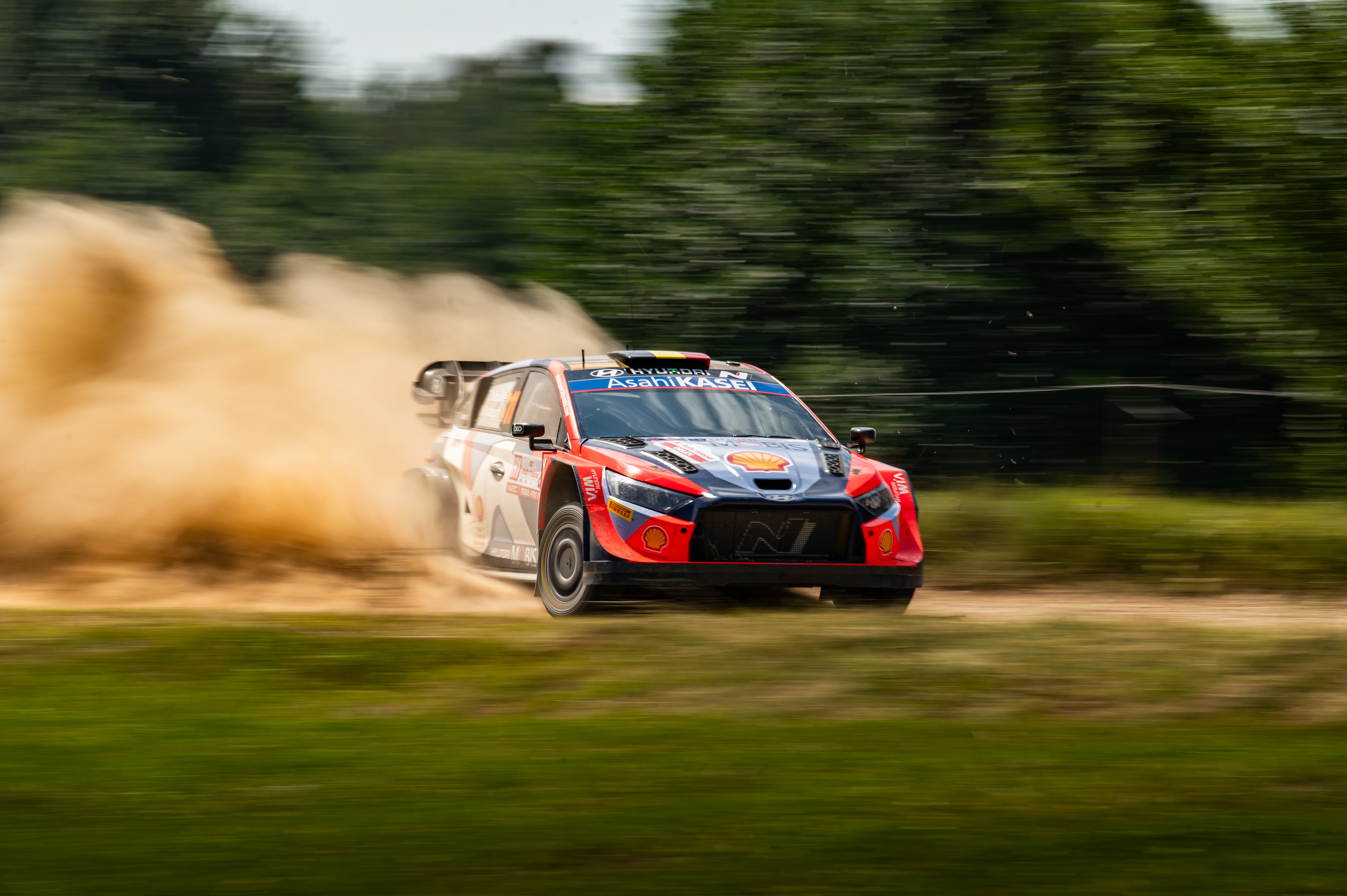
Neuville during 2024 Rally Poland.

After three consecutive seasons finishing third from 2021 to 2023, Neuville finally claimed his first World Rally Championship title in 2024. He, alongside his co-driver Martijn Wydaeghe, also secured Hyundai's first Drivers' Championship title after over a decade in the WRC. Neuville started the season strongly, winning the season-opening Monte Carlo Rally and Acropolis Rally, and remained consistent throughout the campaign. Despite some challenges, including mechanical issues at the season finale in Japan, he secured enough points to confirm his championship victory before the final stage, becoming the first Belgian to win the WRC Drivers' title.

== Circuit racing ==
Neuville made his Touring car racing-debut in the 2019 ADAC TCR Germany Touring Car Championship, driving a Hyundai i30 for Engstler Motorsport in two races at the Nürburgring as a guest driver. In race one, Neuville took pole position, set the fastest lap, led every lap and won the race. For the second race Neuville started tenth, as the starting grid was reversed, and eventually finished sixth in rainy conditions.

After the event, Neuville expressed his desire to contest more circuit races in the future, especially the 24 Hours Nürburgring.

== Rally victories ==
=== WRC victories ===
| # | Event | Season | Co-driver | Car |
|---|---|---|---|---|
| 1 | (Germany) Rally Deutschland | 2014 | (Belgium) Nicolas Gilsoul | Hyundai i20 WRC |
| 2 | (Italy) Rally d'Italia Sardegna | 2016 | (Belgium) Nicolas Gilsoul | Hyundai i20 WRC |
| 3 | (France) Tour de Corse | 2017 | (Belgium) Nicolas Gilsoul | Hyundai i20 Coupe WRC |
| 4 | Rally Argentina | 2017 | (Belgium) Nicolas Gilsoul | Hyundai i20 Coupe WRC |
| 5 | Rally Poland | 2017 | (Belgium) Nicolas Gilsoul | Hyundai i20 Coupe WRC |
| 6 | Rally Australia | 2017 | (Belgium) Nicolas Gilsoul | Hyundai i20 Coupe WRC |
| 7 | Rally Sweden | 2018 | (Belgium) Nicolas Gilsoul | Hyundai i20 Coupe WRC |
| 8 | Rally de Portugal | 2018 | (Belgium) Nicolas Gilsoul | Hyundai i20 Coupe WRC |
| 9 | (Italy) Rally d'Italia Sardegna | 2018 | (Belgium) Nicolas Gilsoul | Hyundai i20 Coupe WRC |
| 10 | (France) Tour de Corse | 2019 | (Belgium) Nicolas Gilsoul | Hyundai i20 Coupe WRC |
| 11 | Rally Argentina | 2019 | (Belgium) Nicolas Gilsoul | Hyundai i20 Coupe WRC |
| 12 | (Spain) Rally Catalunya | 2019 | (Belgium) Nicolas Gilsoul | Hyundai i20 Coupe WRC |
| 13 | (Monaco) Monte Carlo Rally | 2020 | (Belgium) Nicolas Gilsoul | Hyundai i20 Coupe WRC |
| 14 | (Belgium) Ypres Rally | 2021 | (Belgium) Martijn Wydaeghe | Hyundai i20 Coupe WRC |
| 15 | (Spain) Rally Catalunya | 2021 | (Belgium) Martijn Wydaeghe | Hyundai i20 Coupe WRC |
| 16 | (Greece) Acropolis Rally | 2022 | (Belgium) Martijn Wydaeghe | Hyundai i20 N Rally1 |
| 17 | Rally Japan | 2022 | (Belgium) Martijn Wydaeghe | Hyundai i20 N Rally1 |
| 18 | (Italy) Rally d'Italia Sardegna | 2023 | (Belgium) Martijn Wydaeghe | Hyundai i20 N Rally1 |
| 19 | (Europe) Central European Rally | 2023 | (Belgium) Martijn Wydaeghe | Hyundai i20 N Rally1 |
| 20 | (Monaco) Monte Carlo Rally | 2024 | (Belgium) Martijn Wydaeghe | Hyundai i20 N Rally1 |
| 21 | (Greece) Acropolis Rally | 2024 | (Belgium) Martijn Wydaeghe | Hyundai i20 N Rally1 |
| 22 | Rally Saudi Arabia | 2025 | (Belgium) Martijn Wydaeghe | Hyundai i20 N Rally1 |
| 23 | Rally de Portugal | 2026 | (Belgium) Martijn Wydaeghe | Hyundai i20 N Rally1 |

=== JWRC victories ===
| # | Event | Season | Co-driver | Car |
|---|---|---|---|---|
| 1 | Rally Bulgaria | 2010 | (France) Nicolas Klinger | Citroën C2 S1600 |

=== IRC victories ===
| # | Event | Season | Co-driver | Car |
|---|---|---|---|---|
| 1 | (France) Tour de Corse | 2011 | (Belgium) Nicolas Gilsoul | Peugeot 207 S2000 |
| 2 | (Italy) Rallye Sanremo | 2011 | (Belgium) Nicolas Gilsoul | Peugeot 207 S2000 |

== Results ==
=== WRC results ===
| Year | Entrant | Car | 1 | 2 | 3 | 4 | 5 | 6 | 7 | 8 | 9 | 10 | 11 | 12 | 13 | 14 | 15 | WDC | Points |
|---|---|---|---|---|---|---|---|---|---|---|---|---|---|---|---|---|---|---|---|
| 2008 | Thierry Neuville | Ford Fiesta ST | MON | SWE | MEX | ARG | JOR | ITA | GRC | TUR | FIN; DNS | GER | NZL | ESP | FRA | JPN | GBR | NC | 0 |
| 2009 | Thierry Neuville | Citroën C2 R2 Max | IRE | NOR | CYP | POR | ARG | ITA | GRE | POL | FIN | AUS | ESP; Ret | GBR | | | | NC | 0 |
| 2010 | Thierry Neuville | Citroën C2 S1600 | SWE | MEX | JOR | TUR; Ret | NZL | POR; Ret | BUL; 12 | FIN | GER; Ret | JPN | FRA; 27 | ESP | GBR | | | NC | 0 |
| 2012 | Citroën Junior World Rally Team | Citroën DS3 WRC | MON; Ret | SWE; 12 | MEX; 13 | POR; 8 | ARG; 5 | GRE; 6 | | FIN; 16 | GER; 12 | GBR; 7 | FRA; 4 | | ESP; 12 | | | 7th | 53 |
| 2012 | Qatar World Rally Team | Citroën DS3 WRC | | | | | | | NZL; 5 | | | | | ITA; 18 | | | | 7th | 53 |
| 2013 | Qatar World Rally Team | Ford Fiesta RS WRC | MON; Ret | SWE; 5 | MEX; 3 | POR; 17 | ARG; 5 | GRE; 3 | ITA; 2 | FIN; 2 | GER; 2 | AUS; 2 | FRA; 4 | ESP; 4 | GBR; 3 | | | 2nd | 176 |
| 2014 | Hyundai Shell World Rally Team | Hyundai i20 WRC | MON; Ret | SWE; 28 | MEX; 3 | POR; 7 | ARG; 5 | ITA; 16 | POL; 3 | FIN; Ret | GER; 1 | AUS; 7 | FRA; 8 | ESP; 6 | GBR; 4 | | | 6th | 105 |
| 2015 | Hyundai Motorsport | Hyundai i20 WRC | MON; 5 | SWE; 2 | MEX; 8 | ARG; Ret | POR; 38 | ITA; 3 | POL; 6 | FIN; 4 | GER; 5 | AUS; 7 | FRA; 23 | ESP; 8 | | | | 6th | 90 |
| 2015 | Hyundai Motorsport N | Hyundai i20 WRC | | | | | | | | | | | | | GBR; Ret | | | 6th | 90 |
| 2016 | Hyundai Motorsport | Hyundai i20 WRC | MON; 3 | SWE; 14 | MEX; Ret | ARG; 6 | | | POL; 4 | FIN; 4 | GER; 3 | CHN; C | FRA; 2 | ESP; 3 | GBR; 3 | AUS; 3 | | 2nd | 160 |
| 2016 | Hyundai Motorsport N | Hyundai i20 WRC | | | | | POR; 29 | ITA; 1 | | | | | | | | | | 2nd | 160 |
| 2017 | Hyundai Motorsport | Hyundai i20 Coupe WRC | MON; 15 | SWE; 13 | MEX; 3 | FRA; 1 | ARG; 1 | POR; 2 | ITA; 3 | POL; 1 | FIN; 6 | GER; 44 | ESP; Ret | GBR; 2 | AUS; 1 | | | 2nd | 208 |
| 2018 | Hyundai Shell Mobis WRT | Hyundai i20 Coupe WRC | MON; 5 | SWE; 1 | MEX; 6 | FRA; 3 | ARG; 2 | POR; 1 | ITA; 1 | FIN; 9 | GER; 2 | TUR; 16 | GBR; 5 | ESP; 4 | AUS; Ret | | | 2nd | 201 |
| 2019 | Hyundai Shell Mobis WRT | Hyundai i20 Coupe WRC | MON; 2 | SWE; 3 | MEX; 4 | FRA; 1 | ARG; 1 | CHL; Ret | POR; 2 | ITA; 6 | FIN; 6 | GER; 4 | TUR; 8 | GBR; 2 | ESP; 1 | AUS; C | | 2nd | 227 |
| 2020 | Hyundai Shell Mobis WRT | Hyundai i20 Coupe WRC | MON; 1 | SWE; 6 | MEX; 16 | EST; Ret | TUR; 2 | ITA; 2 | MNZ; Ret | | | | | | | | | 4th | 87 |
| 2021 | Hyundai Shell Mobis WRT | Hyundai i20 Coupe WRC | MON; 3 | ARC; 3 | CRO; 3 | POR; 36 | ITA; 3 | KEN; Ret | EST; 3 | BEL; 1 | GRE; 8 | FIN; Ret | ESP; 1 | MNZ; 4 | | | | 3rd | 176 |
| 2022 | Hyundai Shell Mobis WRT | Hyundai i20 N Rally1 | MON; 6 | SWE; 2 | CRO; 3 | POR; 5 | ITA; 41 | KEN; 5 | EST; 4 | FIN; 5 | BEL; 20 | GRE; 1 | NZL; 4 | ESP; 2 | JPN; 1 | | | 3rd | 193 |
| 2023 | Hyundai Shell Mobis WRT | Hyundai i20 N Rally1 | MON; 3 | SWE; 3 | MEX; 2 | CRO; 33 | POR; 5 | ITA; 1 | KEN; DSQ | EST; 2 | FIN; 2 | GRE; 20 | CHL; 2 | EUR; 1 | JPN; 13 | | | 3rd | 189 |
| 2024 | Hyundai Shell Mobis WRT | Hyundai i20 N Rally1 | MON; 1 | SWE; 4 | KEN; 5 | CRO; 3 | POR; 3 | ITA; 41 | POL; 4 | LAT; 8 | FIN; 2 | GRE; 1 | CHL; 4 | EUR; 3 | JPN; 6 | | | 1st | 242 |
| 2025 | Hyundai Shell Mobis WRT | Hyundai i20 N Rally1 | MON; 6 | SWE; 3 | KEN; 3 | ESP; 7 | POR; 4 | ITA; 19 | GRE; 5 | EST; 3 | FIN; 6 | PAR; 3 | CHL; 4 | EUR; Ret | JPN; Ret | SAU; 1 | | 5th | 194 |
| 2026 | Hyundai Shell Mobis WRT | Hyundai i20 N Rally1 | MON; 5 | SWE; 7 | KEN; 12 | CRO; Ret | ESP; 6 | POR; 1 | JPN; 6 | GRE; 2 | EST; 4 | FIN; 5 | PAR; 37 | CHL; Ret | ITA; 15 | | | 7th | 134 |

* Season still in progress.

=== JWRC results ===
| Year | Entrant | Car | 1 | 2 | 3 | 4 | 5 | 6 | Pos. | Points |
|---|---|---|---|---|---|---|---|---|---|---|
| 2010 | Thierry Neuville | Citroën C2 S1600 | TUR; Ret | POR; Ret | BUL; 1 | GER; Ret | FRA; 3 | ESP | 7th | 40 |

=== IRC results ===
| Year | Entrant | Car | 1 | 2 | 3 | 4 | 5 | 6 | 7 | 8 | 9 | 10 | 11 | 12 | WDC | Points |
|---|---|---|---|---|---|---|---|---|---|---|---|---|---|---|---|---|
| 2009 | BF Goodrich Drivers Team | Peugeot 207 S2000 | MON | BRA | KEN | POR | BEL; Ret | RUS | POR | CZE | ESP | ITA | SCO | | NC | 0 |
| 2010 | Peugeot Team Bel-Lux | Peugeot 207 S2000 | MON | BRA | ARG | CAN; Ret | ITA; 4 | BEL; 3 | AZO | MAD | CZE; Ret | ITA; 8 | SCO; Ret | CYP | 9th | 12 |
| 2011 | Peugeot Team Bel-Lux | Peugeot 207 S2000 | MON; Ret | CAN; 3 | COR; 1 | YAL; 6 | YPR; Ret | AZO | ZLI; 4 | MEC; 2 | SAN; 1 | SCO; 6 | CYP; Ret | | 5th | 115 |

=== TCR Germany results ===
(Races in bold indicate pole position; races in italics indicate fastest lap)

| Year | Team | Car | 1 | 2 | 3 | 4 | 5 | 6 | 7 | 8 | 9 | 10 | 11 | 12 | 13 | 14 | DC | Points |
|---|---|---|---|---|---|---|---|---|---|---|---|---|---|---|---|---|---|---|
| 2019 | Team Engstler | Hyundai i30 N TCR | OSC; 1 | OSC; 2 | MST; 1 | MST; 2 | RBR; 1 | RBR; 2 | ZAN; 1 | ZAN; 2 | **NÜR**; **1**; 1 | NÜR; 2; 6 | HOC; 1 | HOC; 2 | SAC; 1 | SAC; 2 | NC† | 0† |

† As Neuville was a guest driver, he was ineligible to score points.

=== WRC summary ===
| Season | Team | Starts | Victories | Podiums | Stage wins | DNF | Points | Final result |
|---|---|---|---|---|---|---|---|---|
| 2009 | Private | 1 | 0 | 0 | 0 | 1 | 0 | NC |
| 2010 | Private | 5 | 0 | 0 | 0 | 3 | 0 | NC |
| 2012 | Citroën Junior | 11 | 0 | 0 | 8 | 1 | 42 | 7th |
| 2012 | Qatar | 2 | 0 | 0 | 3 | 0 | 11 | 7th |
| 2013 | Qatar | 13 | 0 | 7 | 22 | 1 | 176 | 2nd |
| 2014 | Hyundai | 13 | 1 | 3 | 6 | 2 | 105 | 6th |
| 2015 | Hyundai | 13 | 0 | 2 | 10 | 2 | 90 | 6th |
| 2016 | Hyundai | 13 | 1 | 7 | 30 | 1 | 160 | 2nd |
| 2017 | Hyundai | 13 | 4 | 8 | 56 | 1 | 208 | 2nd |
| 2018 | Hyundai | 13 | 3 | 6 | 40 | 1 | 201 | 2nd |
| 2019 | Hyundai | 13 | 3 | 7 | 42 | 1 | 227 | 2nd |
| 2020 | Hyundai | 7 | 1 | 3 | 28 | 2 | 87 | 4th |
| 2021 | Hyundai | 12 | 2 | 7 | 44 | 2 | 176 | 3rd |
| 2022 | Hyundai | 13 | 2 | 5 | 34 | 0 | 193 | 3rd |
| 2023 | Hyundai | 13 | 2 | 8 | 40 | 1 | 189 | 3rd |
| 2024 | Hyundai | 13 | 2 | 6 | 50 | 0 | 242 | 1st |
| 2025 | Hyundai | 14 | 1 | 5 | 17 | 2 | 194 | 5th |
| 2026 | Hyundai | 13 | 1 | 2 | 20 | 2 | 134 | 7th |
| Total | | 195 | 23 | 76 | 450 | 23 | 2435 | |

== Personal life ==
Although he uses French pacenotes, he is a native German speaker. His younger brothers Yannick Neuville and Tom Heindrichs are also rally drivers.

Neuville became a father on 8 July 2019, as he and his girlfriend Déborah Ghys have a daughter, Camille. Both later married.

Sporting positions
| Preceded by Kalle Rovanperä | World Rally Champion; 2024 | Succeeded by Sébastien Ogier |
