= 2025 Rally del Paraguay =

2nd edition of the Rally del Paraguay

2025 Rally del Paraguay Ueno Rally del Paraguay 2025
Round 10 of 14 in the 2025 World Rally Championship
| ← Previous event | Next event → |
- Host country: Paraguay
- Rally base: Encarnación, Itapúa
- Dates run: 28 – 31 August 2025
- Start location: Cambyretá, Itapúa
- Finish location: Hohenau, Itapúa
- Stages: 19 (335.22 km; 208.30 miles)
- Stage surface: Gravel
- Transport distance: 664.41 km (412.85 miles)
- Overall distance: 999.63 km (621.14 miles)

Statistics
- Crews registered: 48
- Crews: 47 at start, 40 at finish

Overall results
- Overall winner: (France) Sébastien Ogier (France) Vincent Landais (Japan) Toyota Gazoo Racing WRT; 3:00:06.6
- Sunday Accumulated leader: (Belgium) Thierry Neuville (Belgium) Martijn Wydaeghe (South Korea) Hyundai Shell Mobis WRT; 42:26.5
- Power Stage winner: (Belgium) Thierry Neuville (Belgium) Martijn Wydaeghe (South Korea) Hyundai Shell Mobis WRT; 9:41.9

Support category results
- WRC-2 winner: (Sweden) Oliver Solberg (United Kingdom) Elliott Edmondson (Finland) Printsport; 3:07:00.4
- WRC-3 winner: (Italy) Matteo Fontana (Italy) Alessandro Arnaboldi; 3:25:35.7

The 2025 Rally del Paraguay (also known as the Ueno Rally del Paraguay 2025) was a motor racing event for rally cars held over four days from 28 to 31 August 2025. It marked the second running of the Rally del Paraguay, and was the tenth round of the 2025 World Rally Championship, 2025 WRC2 Championship and 2025 WRC3 Championship. The 2025 event was based in Encarnación in Itapúa and was contested over nineteen special stages, covering a total competitive distance of 335.22 km (208.30 mi).

Sébastien Ogier and Vincent Landais won the rally, and their team, Toyota Gazoo Racing WRT, were the manufacturer's winner. Oliver Solberg and Elliott Edmondson were the winners in the WRC2 category. Matteo Fontana and Alessandro Arnaboldi were the winners in the WRC3 category.

== Background ==
=== Entry list ===
The following crews entered into the rally. The event was opened to crews competing in the World Rally Championship, its support categories, the WRC2 Championship, the WRC3 Championship and privateer entries that were not registered to score points in any championship. Ten were entered under Rally1 regulations, as were twenty-nine Rally2 crews in the WRC2 Championship and six Rally3 crew in the WRC3 Championship.

Rally1 entries competing in the World Rally Championship
| No. | Driver | Co-Driver | Entrant | Car | Championship eligibility | Tyre |
|---|---|---|---|---|---|---|
| 1 | (Belgium) Thierry Neuville | (Belgium) Martijn Wydaeghe | (South Korea) Hyundai Shell Mobis WRT | Hyundai i20 N Rally1 | Driver, Co-driver, Manufacturer | H |
| 5 | (Finland) Sami Pajari | (Finland) Marko Salminen | (Japan) Toyota Gazoo Racing WRT2 | Toyota GR Yaris Rally1 | Driver, Co-driver, Manufacturer, Team | H |
| 8 | (Estonia) Ott Tänak | (Estonia) Martin Järveoja | (South Korea) Hyundai Shell Mobis WRT | Hyundai i20 N Rally1 | Driver, Co-driver, Manufacturer | H |
| 13 | (Luxembourg) Grégoire Munster | (Belgium) Louis Louka | (United Kingdom) M-Sport Ford WRT | Ford Puma Rally1 | Driver, Co-driver, Manufacturer | H |
| 16 | (France) Adrien Fourmaux | (France) Alexandre Coria | (South Korea) Hyundai Shell Mobis WRT | Hyundai i20 N Rally1 | Driver, Co-driver, Manufacturer | H |
| 17 | (France) Sébastien Ogier | (France) Vincent Landais | (Japan) Toyota Gazoo Racing WRT | Toyota GR Yaris Rally1 | Driver, Co-driver, Manufacturer | H |
| 18 | (Japan) Takamoto Katsuta | (Republic of Ireland) Aaron Johnston | (Japan) Toyota Gazoo Racing WRT | Toyota GR Yaris Rally1 | Driver, Co-driver | H |
| 33 | (United Kingdom) Elfyn Evans | (United Kingdom) Scott Martin | (Japan) Toyota Gazoo Racing WRT | Toyota GR Yaris Rally1 | Driver, Co-driver, Manufacturer | H |
| 55 | (Republic of Ireland) Josh McErlean | (Republic of Ireland) Eoin Treacy | (United Kingdom) M-Sport Ford WRT | Ford Puma Rally1 | Driver, Co-driver, Manufacturer | H |
| 69 | (Finland) Kalle Rovanperä | (Finland) Jonne Halttunen | (Japan) Toyota Gazoo Racing WRT | Toyota GR Yaris Rally1 | Driver, Co-driver, Manufacturer | H |

Rally2 entries competing in the WRC2 Championship
| No. | Driver | Co-Driver | Entrant | Car | Championship eligibility | Tyre |
|---|---|---|---|---|---|---|
| 20 | (Sweden) Oliver Solberg | (United Kingdom) Elliott Edmondson | (Finland) Printsport | Toyota GR Yaris Rally2 | Driver, Co-driver | H |
| 21 | (France) Yohan Rossel | (France) Arnaud Dunand | (France) PH Sport | Citroën C3 Rally2 | Driver, Co-driver | H |
| 22 | (United Kingdom) Gus Greensmith | (Sweden) Jonas Andersson | (United Kingdom) Gus Greensmith | Škoda Fabia RS Rally2 | Driver, Co-driver | H |
| 23 | (Estonia) Robert Virves | (Estonia) Jakko Viilo | (Germany) Toksport WRT | Škoda Fabia RS Rally2 | Challenger Driver, Challenger Co-driver, Team | H |
| 24 | (Poland) Kajetan Kajetanowicz | (Poland) Maciej Szczepaniak | (Poland) Kajetan Kajetanowicz | Toyota GR Yaris Rally2 | Challenger Driver, Challenger Co-driver | H |
| 25 | (Paraguay) Fabrizio Zaldivar | (Italy) Marcelo Der Ohannesian | (Paraguay) Fabrizio Zaldivar | Škoda Fabia RS Rally2 | Challenger Driver, Challenger Co-driver | H |
| 26 | (Bulgaria) Nikolay Gryazin | (Kyrgyzstan) Konstantin Aleksandrov | (Germany) Toksport WRT | Škoda Fabia RS Rally2 | Challenger Driver, Challenger Co-driver, Team | H |
| 27 | (Paraguay) Diego Domínguez Jr. | (Spain) Rogelio Peñate | (Paraguay) Diego Domínguez Jr. | Toyota GR Yaris Rally2 | Challenger Driver, Challenger Co-driver | H |
| 28 | (Bolivia) Marco Bulacia | (Brazil) Gabriel Morales | (Bolivia) Marco Bulacia | Toyota GR Yaris Rally2 | Challenger Driver, Challenger Co-driver | H |
| 29 | (Paraguay) Miguel Zaldivar | (Argentina) Luis Allende | (Paraguay) Miguel Zaldivar | Škoda Fabia RS Rally2 | Challenger Driver, Challenger Co-driver | H |
| 30 | (Paraguay) Alejandro Galanti | (Paraguay) Marcelo Toyotoshi | (Paraguay) Alejandro Galanti | Toyota GR Yaris Rally2 | Challenger Driver, Challenger Co-driver | H |
| 31 | (Paraguay) Agustín Alonso | (Paraguay) Edgardo Galindo | (Paraguay) Agustín Alonso | Škoda Fabia RS Rally2 | Challenger Driver, Challenger Co-driver | H |
| 32 | (Paraguay) Gustavo Saba | (Argentina) José Díaz | (Paraguay) Gustavo Saba | Toyota GR Yaris Rally2 | Challenger Driver, Challenger Co-driver | H |
| 34 | (Paraguay) Tiago Weiler | (Paraguay) Juan Sánchez | (Paraguay) Tiago Weiler | Toyota GR Yaris Rally2 | Challenger Driver, Challenger Co-driver | H |
| 35 | (Paraguay) Diego Domínguez | (Argentina) Fernando Mussano | (Paraguay) Diego Domínguez | Toyota GR Yaris Rally2 | Challenger/Masters Driver, Challenger Co-driver | H |
| 36 | (Paraguay) Augusto Bestard | (Spain) Borja Rozada | (Paraguay) Augusto Bestard | Škoda Fabia RS Rally2 | Challenger Driver, Challenger Co-driver | H |
| 37 | (Paraguay) Juan Masi | (Paraguay) Matías Ramos | (Paraguay) Juan Masi | Škoda Fabia Rally2 evo | Challenger Driver, Challenger Co-driver | H |
| 38 | (Paraguay) Miguel Zaldivar | (Argentina) Rubén García | (Paraguay) Miguel Zaldivar | Škoda Fabia RS Rally2 | Challenger/Masters Driver, Challenger/Masters Co-driver | H |
| 39 | (Paraguay) Matías Domínguez | (Argentina) Diego Cagnotti | (Paraguay) Matías Domínguez | Škoda Fabia R5 | Challenger/Masters Driver, Challenger/Masters Co-driver | H |
| 40 | (Paraguay) Franco Pappalardo | (Paraguay) Juan Pablo Carrera | (Paraguay) Franco Pappalardo | Škoda Fabia RS Rally2 | Challenger Driver, Challenger Co-driver | H |
| 41 | (Paraguay) Didier Arias | (Paraguay) Hector Nunes | (Paraguay) Didier Arias | Volkswagen Polo GTI R5 | Challenger Driver, Challenger Co-driver | H |
| 42 | (Paraguay) Miguel María García | (Paraguay) Juan José Bilbao | (Paraguay) Miguel María García | Hyundai i20 N Rally2 | Challenger Driver, Challenger Co-driver | H |
| 43 | (Paraguay) Miguel Ángel García | (Paraguay) Hernán Vargas Peña | (Paraguay) Miguel Ángel García | Škoda Fabia RS Rally2 | Challenger Driver, Challenger Co-driver | H |
| 44 | (Paraguay) Luis Ortega | (Argentina) Leonardo Suaya | (Paraguay) Luis Ortega | Volkswagen Polo GTI R5 | Challenger/Masters Driver, Challenger Co-driver | H |
| 45 | (Peru) Jorge Martínez Merizalde | (Chile) José Alberto Aros | (Peru) Jorge Martínez Merizalde | Hyundai i20 N Rally2 | Challenger/Masters Driver, Challenger Co-driver | H |
| 46 | (Paraguay) Mauricio González | (Paraguay) Fernando Mendonca | (Paraguay) Mauricio González | Škoda Fabia RS Rally2 | Challenger Driver, Challenger Co-driver | H |
| 47 | (Paraguay) Sebastián González | (Paraguay) Diego Fabiani | (Paraguay) Sebastián González | Škoda Fabia Rally2 evo | Challenger Driver, Challenger Co-driver | H |
| 48 | (Paraguay) Blas Zapag | (Paraguay) Enrique Fratta | (Paraguay) Blas Zapag | Volkswagen Polo GTI R5 | Challenger/Masters Driver, Challenger Co-driver | H |
| 49 | (Paraguay) Cesar Pedotti | (Paraguay) Nicolas Elizaur | (Paraguay) Cesar Pedotti | Volkswagen Polo GTI R5 | Challenger/Masters Driver, Challenger Co-driver | H |

Rally3 entries competing in the WRC3 Championship
| No. | Driver | Co-Driver | Entrant | Car | Class/Championship eligibility | Tyre |
|---|---|---|---|---|---|---|
| 50 | (Italy) Matteo Fontana | (Italy) Alessandro Arnaboldi | (Italy) Matteo Fontana | Ford Fiesta Rally3 | WRC3 | H |
| 51 | (France) Ghjuvanni Rossi | (France) Kylian Sarmezan | (France) Ghjuvanni Rossi | Ford Fiesta Rally3 | WRC3 | H |
| 52 | (Bolivia) Nataniel Bruun | (Argentina) Pablo Olmos | (Bolivia) Nataniel Bruun | Ford Fiesta Rally3 | WRC3 | H |
| 53 | (Peru) André Martinez | (Argentina) Matias Aranguren | (Peru) André Martinez | Ford Fiesta Rally3 | WRC3 | H |
| 54 | (Greece) Georgios Vasilakis | (Republic of Ireland) Allan Harryman | (Greece) Georgios Vasilakis | Ford Fiesta Rally3 | WRC3, Masters Driver, Masters Co-Driver | H |
| 56 | (Peru) Eduardo Castro | (Peru) Julio Echazú | (Peru) Eduardo Castro | Ford Fiesta Rally3 | WRC3 | H |

=== Itinerary ===
All dates and times are UYT (UTC-3).

| Date | No. | Time span | Stage name | Distance |
|---|---|---|---|---|
| 28 August | — | After 9:01 | Trinidad [Shakedown] | 4.92 km |
| 28 August | | After 19:00 | Opening ceremony, Encarnación | —N/a |
| 29 August | SS1 | After 8:03 | Cambyretá 1 | 18.70 km |
| 29 August | SS2 | After 9:01 | Nueva Alborada 1 | 19.25 km |
| 29 August | SS3 | After 10:00 | Yerbatera 1 | 30.00 km |
| 29 August | SS4 | After 11:01 | Autódromo 1 | 2.50 km |
| 29 August | | 11:41 – 12:11 | Regroup, Encarnación | —N/a |
| 29 August | | 12:11 – 12:51 | Service A, Encarnación | —N/a |
| 29 August | SS5 | After 13:34 | Cambyretá 2 | 18.70 km |
| 29 August | SS6 | After 14:32 | Nueva Alborada 2 | 19.25 km |
| 29 August | SS7 | After 15:31 | Yerbatera 2 | 30.00 km |
| 29 August | SS8 | After 16:44 | Autódromo 2 | 2.50 km |
| 29 August | | 17:34 – 18:19 | Flexi service B, Encarnación | —N/a |
| 30 August | SS9 | After 7:35 | Carmen del Paraná 1 | 18.67 km |
| 30 August | SS10 | After 8:38 | Artigas 1 | 23.14 km |
| 30 August | SS11 | After 10:16 | Cantera 1 | 13.74 km |
| 30 August | SS12 | After 11:35 | Autódromo 3 | 2.50 km |
| 30 August | | 12:15 – 12:35 | Regroup, Encarnación | —N/a |
| 30 August | | 12:35 – 13:15 | Service C, Encarnación | —N/a |
| 30 August | SS13 | After 14:05 | Carmen del Paraná 2 | 18.67 km |
| 30 August | SS14 | After 15:08 | Artigas 2 | 23.14 km |
| 30 August | SS15 | After 16:46 | Cantera 2 | 13.74 km |
| 30 August | | 18:01 – 18:46 | Flexi service D, Encarnación | —N/a |
| 31 August | SS16 | After 8:29 | Bella Vista 1 | 21.86 km |
| 31 August | | 9:22 – 9:37 | Regroup, Hohenau | —N/a |
| 31 August | SS17 | After 10:05 | Misión Jesuítica Trinidad 1 | 18.50 km |
| 31 August | SS18 | After 11:02 | Bella Vista 2 | 21.86 km |
| 31 August | | 11:55 – 12:45 | Regroup, Hohenau | —N/a |
| 31 August | SS19 | After 13:15 | Misión Jesuítica Trinidad 2 [Power Stage] | 18.50 km |
| 31 August | | After 13:35 | Podium ceremony, Misiones Jesuíticas Trinidad | —N/a |

== Report ==
=== WRC Rally1 ===
==== Classification ====
| Position | | No. | Driver | Co-driver | Entrant | Car | Time | Difference | Points | | | |
| Event | Class | No. | Driver | Co-driver | Entrant | Car | Time | Difference | Event | Sunday | Stage | Total |
|---|---|---|---|---|---|---|---|---|---|---|---|---|
| 1 | 1 | 17 | Sébastien Ogier | Vincent Landais | Toyota Gazoo Racing WRT | Toyota GR Yaris Rally1 | 3:00:06.6 | 0.0 | 25 | 1 | 0 | 26 |
| 2 | 2 | 33 | Elfyn Evans | Scott Martin | Toyota Gazoo Racing WRT | Toyota GR Yaris Rally1 | 3:00:32.8 | +26.2 | 17 | 3 | 2 | 22 |
| 3 | 3 | 1 | Thierry Neuville | Martijn Wydaeghe | Hyundai Shell Mobis WRT | Hyundai i20 N Rally1 | 3:00:33.8 | +27.2 | 15 | 5 | 5 | 25 |
| 4 | 4 | 10 | Ott Tänak | Martin Järveoja | Hyundai Shell Mobis WRT | Hyundai i20 N Rally1 | 3:00:37.2 | +30.6 | 12 | 2 | 3 | 17 |
| 5 | 5 | 69 | Kalle Rovanperä | Jonne Halttunen | Toyota Gazoo Racing WRT | Toyota GR Yaris Rally1 | 3:02:11.8 | +2:05.2 | 10 | 4 | 4 | 18 |
| 6 | 6 | 5 | Sami Pajari | Marko Salminen | Toyota Gazoo Racing WRT2 | Toyota GR Yaris Rally1 | 3:03:42.1 | +3:35.5 | 8 | 0 | 0 | 8 |
| 16 | 7 | 18 | Takamoto Katsuta | Aaron Johnston | Toyota Gazoo Racing WRT | Toyota GR Yaris Rally1 | 3:22:17.5 | +22:10.9 | 0 | 0 | 0 | 0 |
| 29 | 8 | 55 | Josh McErlean | Eoin Treacy | M-Sport Ford WRT | Ford Puma Rally1 | 4:02:13.3 | +1:02:06.7 | 0 | 0 | 0 | 0 |
| 39 | 9 | 13 | Grégoire Munster | Louis Louka | M-Sport Ford WRT | Ford Puma Rally1 | 4:39:03.8 | +1:38:57.2 | 0 | 0 | 0 | 0 |
| Retired SS19 | | 16 | Adrien Fourmaux | Alexandre Coria | Hyundai Shell Mobis WRT | Hyundai i20 N Rally1 | Withdrawn | | 0 | 0 | 0 | 0 |

==== Special stages ====
| Stage | Winners | Car | Time | Class leaders |
|---|---|---|---|---|
| SD | Katsuta / Johnston | Toyota GR Yaris Rally1 | 2:24.4 | —N/a |
| SS1 | Rovanperä / Halttunen | Toyota GR Yaris Rally1 | 9:30.7 | Rovanperä / Halttunen |
| SS2 | Fourmaux / Coria | Hyundai i20 N Rally1 | 10:46.7 | Rovanperä / Halttunen |
| SS3 | Ogier / Landais | Toyota GR Yaris Rally1 | 15:55.5 | Fourmaux / Coria |
| SS4 | Fourmaux / Coria | Hyundai i20 N Rally1 | 1:50.5 | Fourmaux / Coria |
| SS5 | Ogier / Landais | Toyota GR Yaris Rally1 | 9:30.8 | Fourmaux / Coria |
| SS6 | Tänak / Järveoja | Hyundai i20 N Rally1 | 10:40.1 | Fourmaux / Coria |
| SS7 | Ogier / Landais | Toyota GR Yaris Rally1 | 15:42.4 | Rovanperä / Halttunen |
| SS8 | Ogier / Landais | Toyota GR Yaris Rally1 | 1:49.7 | Rovanperä / Halttunen |
| SS9 | Rovanperä / Halttunen | Toyota GR Yaris Rally1 | 10:23.3 | Rovanperä / Halttunen |
| SS10 | Ogier / Landais | Toyota GR Yaris Rally1 | 10:28.8 | Rovanperä / Halttunen |
| SS11 | Rovanperä / Halttunen | Toyota GR Yaris Rally1 | 8:47.0 | Rovanperä / Halttunen |
| SS12 | Ogier / Landais | Toyota GR Yaris Rally1 | 1:47.8 | Rovanperä / Halttunen |
| SS13 | Ogier / Landais | Toyota GR Yaris Rally1 | 10:13.9 | Rovanperä / Halttunen |
| SS14 | Ogier / Landais | Toyota GR Yaris Rally1 | 10:25.3 | Ogier / Landais |
| SS15 | Rovanperä / Halttunen | Toyota GR Yaris Rally1 | 8:38.6 | Ogier / Landais |
| SS16 | Ogier / Landais | Toyota GR Yaris Rally1 | 11:49.7 | Ogier / Landais |
| SS17 | Neuville / Wydaeghe | Hyundai i20 N Rally1 | 9:50.7 | Ogier / Landais |
| SS18 | Rovanperä / Halttunen | Toyota GR Yaris Rally1 | 11:00.7 | Ogier / Landais |
| SS19 | Neuville / Wydaeghe | Hyundai i20 N Rally1 | 9:41.9 | Ogier / Landais |

==== Championship standings ====
Drivers' Standings
| Move | Pos. | Driver | Points |
|---|---|---|---|
| | 1 | Elfyn Evans | 198 |
| | 2 | Kalle Rovanperä | 191 |
| | 3 | Sébastien Ogier | 189 |
| | 4 | Ott Tänak | 180 |
| | 5 | Thierry Neuville | 150 |

Co-drivers' Standings
| Move | Pos. | Driver | Points |
|---|---|---|---|
| | 1 | Scott Martin | 198 |
| | 2 | Jonne Halttunen | 191 |
| | 3 | Vincent Landais | 189 |
| | 4 | Martin Järveoja | 180 |
| | 5 | Martijn Wydaeghe | 150 |

Manufacturers' Standings
| Move | Pos. | Driver | Points |
|---|---|---|---|
| | 1 | Toyota Gazoo Racing WRT | 513 |
| | 2 | Hyundai Shell Mobis WRT | 413 |
| | 3 | M-Sport Ford WRT | 143 |
| | 4 | Toyota Gazoo Racing WRT2 | 96 |

=== WRC2 Rally2 ===
==== Classification ====
| Position | | No. | Driver | Co-driver | Entrant | Car | Time | Difference | Points | |
| Event | Class | No. | Driver | Co-driver | Entrant | Car | Time | Difference | Class | Event |
|---|---|---|---|---|---|---|---|---|---|---|
| 7 | 1 | 20 | Oliver Solberg | Elliott Edmondson | Printsport | Toyota GR Yaris Rally2 | 3:07:00.4 | 0.0 | 25 | 6 |
| 8 | 2 | 21 | Yohan Rossel | Arnaud Dunand | PH Sport | Citroën C3 Rally2 | 3:07:22.9 | +22.5 | 17 | 4 |
| 9 | 3 | 26 | Nikolay Gryazin | Konstantin Aleksandrov | Toksport WRT | Škoda Fabia RS Rally2 | 3:08:54.8 | +1:54.4 | 15 | 2 |
| 10 | 4 | 25 | Fabrizio Zaldivar | Marcelo Der Ohannesian | Fabrizio Zaldivar | Škoda Fabia RS Rally2 | 3:09:23.6 | +2:23.2 | 12 | 1 |
| 11 | 5 | 23 | Robert Virves | Jakko Viilo | Toksport WRT | Škoda Fabia RS Rally2 | 3:09:32.6 | +2:32.2 | 10 | 0 |
| 12 | 6 | 36 | Augusto Bestard | Borja Rozada | Augusto Bestard | Škoda Fabia RS Rally2 | 3:13:33.6 | +6:33.2 | 8 | 0 |
| 13 | 7 | 34 | Tiago Weiler | Juan Sánchez | Tiago Weiler | Toyota GR Yaris Rally2 | 3:18:00.0 | +10:59.6 | 6 | 0 |
| 14 | 8 | 40 | Franco Pappalardo | Juan Pablo Carrera | Franco Pappalardo | Škoda Fabia RS Rally2 | 3:18:11.3 | +11:10.9 | 4 | 0 |
| 15 | 9 | 38 | Miguel Zaldivar | Rubén García | Miguel Zaldivar | Škoda Fabia RS Rally2 | 3:20:28.9 | +13:28.5 | 2 | 0 |
| 20 | 10 | 30 | Alejandro Galanti | Marcelo Toyotoshi | Alejandro Galanti | Toyota GR Yaris Rally2 | 3:31:31.8 | +24:31.4 | 1 | 0 |
| 21 | 11 | 43 | Miguel Ángel García | Hernán Vargas Peña | Miguel Ángel García | Škoda Fabia RS Rally2 | 3:34:08.5 | +27:08.1 | 0 | 0 |
| 22 | 12 | 32 | Gustavo Saba | José Díaz | Gustavo Saba | Toyota GR Yaris Rally2 | 3:34:43.2 | +27:42.8 | 0 | 0 |
| 23 | 13 | 24 | Kajetan Kajetanowicz | Maciej Szczepaniak | Kajetan Kajetanowicz | Toyota GR Yaris Rally2 | 3:38:34.0 | +31:33.6 | 0 | 0 |
| 24 | 14 | 45 | Jorge Martínez Merizalde | José Alberto Aros | Jorge Martínez Merizalde | Hyundai i20 N Rally2 | 3:40:54.0 | +33:53.6 | 0 | 0 |
| 27 | 15 | 22 | Gus Greensmith | Jonas Andersson | Gus Greensmith | Škoda Fabia RS Rally2 | 3:48:33.5 | +41:33.1 | 0 | 0 |
| 28 | 16 | 48 | Blas Zapag | Enrique Fratta | Blas Zapag | Volkswagen Polo GTI R5 | 3:50:15.8 | +43:15.4 | 0 | 0 |
| 30 | 17 | 27 | Diego Domínguez Jr. | Rogelio Peñate | Diego Domínguez Jr. | Toyota GR Yaris Rally2 | 4:07:11.8 | +1:00:11.4 | 0 | 0 |
| 31 | 18 | 41 | Didier Arias | Hector Nunes | Didier Arias | Volkswagen Polo GTI R5 | 4:15:01.6 | +1:08:01.2 | 0 | 0 |
| 32 | 19 | 46 | Mauricio González | Fernando Mendonca | Mauricio González | Škoda Fabia RS Rally2 | 4:20:38.7 | +1:13:38.3 | 0 | 0 |
| 33 | 20 | 42 | Miguel María García | Juan José Bilbao | Miguel María García | Hyundai i20 N Rally2 | 4:24:12.1 | +1:17:11.7 | 0 | 0 |
| 37 | 21 | 49 | Cesar Pedotti | Nicolas Elizaur | Cesar Pedotti | Volkswagen Polo GTI R5 | 4:29:43.8 | +1:22:43.4 | 0 | 0 |
| 38 | 22 | 31 | Agustín Alonso | Edgardo Galindo | Agustín Alonso | Škoda Fabia RS Rally2 | 4:34:53.3 | +1:27:52.9 | 0 | 0 |
| Retired SS19 | | 44 | Luis Ortega | Leonardo Suaya | Luis Ortega | Volkswagen Polo GTI R5 | Withdrawn | | 0 | 0 |
| Retired SS18 | | 35 | Diego Domínguez | Fernando Mussano | Diego Domínguez | Toyota GR Yaris Rally2 | Withdrawn | | 0 | 0 |
| Retired SS16 | | 37 | Juan Masi | Matías Ramos | Juan Masi | Škoda Fabia Rally2 evo | Withdrawn | | 0 | 0 |
| Retired SS9 | | 29 | Miguel Zaldivar | Luis Allende | Miguel Zaldivar | Škoda Fabia RS Rally2 | Mechanical | | 0 | 0 |
| Retired SS3 | | 39 | Matías Domínguez | Diego Cagnotti | Matías Domínguez | Škoda Fabia R5 | Withdrawn | | 0 | 0 |
| Retired SS1 | | 47 | Sebastián González | Diego Fabiani | Sebastián González | Škoda Fabia Rally2 evo | Accident | | 0 | 0 |

==== Special stages ====
Overall
| Stage | Winners | Car | Time | Class leaders |
|---|---|---|---|---|
| SD | Gryazin / Aleksandrov | Skoda Fabia RS Rally2 | 2:32.3 | —N/a |
| SS1 | Solberg / Edmondson | Toyota GR Yaris Rally2 | 9:59.0 | Solberg / Edmondson |
| SS2 | D. Domínguez Jr. / Peñate | Toyota GR Yaris Rally2 | 11:03.9 | D. Domínguez Jr. / Peñate |
| SS3 | D. Domínguez Jr. / Peñate | Toyota GR Yaris Rally2 | 16:37.3 | D. Domínguez Jr. / Peñate |
| SS4 | Solberg / Edmondson | Toyota GR Yaris Rally2 | 1:54.5 | D. Domínguez Jr. / Peñate |
| SS4 | D. Domínguez Jr. / Peñate | Toyota GR Yaris Rally2 | 1:54.5 | D. Domínguez Jr. / Peñate |
| SS4 | Alonso / Galindo | Toyota GR Yaris Rally2 | 1:54.5 | D. Domínguez Jr. / Peñate |
| SS5 | Solberg / Edmondson | Toyota GR Yaris Rally2 | 9:54.9 | Rossel / Dunand |
| SS6 | Solberg / Edmondson | Toyota GR Yaris Rally2 | 11:03.1 | Rossel / Dunand |
| SS7 | Solberg / Edmondson | Toyota GR Yaris Rally2 | 16:21.3 | Rossel / Dunand |
| SS8 | Solberg / Edmondson | Toyota GR Yaris Rally2 | 1:52.5 | Rossel / Dunand |
| SS9 | Solberg / Edmondson | Toyota GR Yaris Rally2 | 10:38.9 | Rossel / Dunand |
| SS10 | Solberg / Edmondson | Toyota GR Yaris Rally2 | 10:56.0 | Gryazin / Aleksandrov |
| SS11 | Solberg / Edmondson | Toyota GR Yaris Rally2 | 9:00.7 | Gryazin / Aleksandrov |
| SS12 | Solberg / Edmondson | Toyota GR Yaris Rally2 | 1:51.6 | Gryazin / Aleksandrov |
| SS13 | Solberg / Edmondson | Toyota GR Yaris Rally2 | 10:37.3 | Gryazin / Aleksandrov |
| SS14 | Solberg / Edmondson | Toyota GR Yaris Rally2 | 10:57.1 | Virves / Viilo |
| SS15 | Solberg / Edmondson | Toyota GR Yaris Rally2 | 8:51.7 | Virves / Viilo |
| SS16 | Greensmith / Andersson | Škoda Fabia RS Rally2 | 12:03.6 | Solberg / Edmondson |
| SS17 | Solberg / Edmondson | Toyota GR Yaris Rally2 | 10:12.3 | Solberg / Edmondson |
| SS18 | Gryazin / Aleksandrov | Skoda Fabia RS Rally2 | 11:29.4 | Solberg / Edmondson |
| SS19 | Solberg / Edmondson | Toyota GR Yaris Rally2 | 10:05.1 | Solberg / Edmondson |

Challenger
| Stage | Winners | Car | Time | Class leaders |
|---|---|---|---|---|
| SD | Gryazin / Aleksandrov | Skoda Fabia RS Rally2 | 2:35.0 | —N/a |
| SS1 | Gryazin / Aleksandrov | Skoda Fabia RS Rally2 | 10:01.5 | Gryazin / Aleksandrov |
| SS2 | D. Domínguez Jr. / Peñate | Toyota GR Yaris Rally2 | 11:03.9 | D. Domínguez Jr. / Peñate |
| SS3 | D. Domínguez Jr. / Peñate | Toyota GR Yaris Rally2 | 16:37.3 | D. Domínguez Jr. / Peñate |
| SS4 | D. Domínguez Jr. / Peñate | Toyota GR Yaris Rally2 | 1:54.5 | D. Domínguez Jr. / Peñate |
| SS4 | Alonso / Galindo | Toyota GR Yaris Rally2 | 1:54.5 | D. Domínguez Jr. / Peñate |
| SS5 | Gryazin / Aleksandrov | Skoda Fabia RS Rally2 | 10:00.5 | D. Domínguez Jr. / Peñate |
| SS6 | Virves / Viilo | Škoda Fabia RS Rally2 | 11:03.8 | D. Domínguez Jr. / Peñate |
| SS7 | Virves / Viilo | Škoda Fabia RS Rally2 | 16:22.9 | Gryazin / Aleksandrov |
| SS8 | D. Domínguez Jr. / Peñate | Toyota GR Yaris Rally2 | 1:52.9 | Gryazin / Aleksandrov |
| SS9 | Gryazin / Aleksandrov | Skoda Fabia RS Rally2 | 10:46.3 | Gryazin / Aleksandrov |
| SS10 | Gryazin / Aleksandrov | Skoda Fabia RS Rally2 | 10:59.6 | Gryazin / Aleksandrov |
| SS11 | Zaldivar / Der Ohannesian | Skoda Fabia RS Rally2 | 9:01.7 | Gryazin / Aleksandrov |
| SS12 | Zaldivar / Der Ohannesian | Skoda Fabia RS Rally2 | 1:52.2 | Gryazin / Aleksandrov |
| SS13 | Virves / Viilo | Škoda Fabia RS Rally2 | 10:40.2 | Gryazin / Aleksandrov |
| SS14 | Virves / Viilo | Škoda Fabia RS Rally2 | 11:02.4 | Virves / Viilo |
| SS15 | Zaldivar / Der Ohannesian | Skoda Fabia RS Rally2 | 8:54.4 | Virves / Viilo |
| SS16 | D. Domínguez Jr. / Peñate | Toyota GR Yaris Rally2 | 12:02.5 | Virves / Viilo |
| SS17 | Gryazin / Aleksandrov | Skoda Fabia RS Rally2 | 10:15.2 | Virves / Viilo |
| SS18 | Gryazin / Aleksandrov | Skoda Fabia RS Rally2 | 11:29.4 | Gryazin / Aleksandrov |
| SS19 | Virves / Viilo | Škoda Fabia RS Rally2 | 10:11.7 | Gryazin / Aleksandrov |

==== Championship standings ====
Drivers' Standings
| Move | Pos. | Driver | Points |
|---|---|---|---|
| | 1 | Oliver Solberg | 110 |
| | 2 | Yohan Rossel | 99 |
| | 3 | Roope Korhonen | 69 |
| 1 | 4 | Robert Virves | 60 |
| 1 | 5 | Gus Greensmith | 57 |

Co-drivers' Standings
| Move | Pos. | Driver | Points |
|---|---|---|---|
| | 1 | Elliott Edmondson | 110 |
| | 2 | Arnaud Dunand | 99 |
| | 3 | Anssi Viinikka | 69 |
| 1 | 4 | Jakko Viilo | 60 |
| 1 | 5 | Jonas Andersson | 57 |

Manufacturers' Standings
| Move | Pos. | Driver | Points |
|---|---|---|---|
| | 1 | PH Sport | 178 |
| | 2 | Toksport WRT | 173 |
| | 3 | Toyota Gazoo Racing WRT NG | 89 |
| | 4 | Sarrazin Motorsport – Iron Lynx | 64 |

Challenger Drivers' Standings
| Move | Pos. | Driver | Points |
|---|---|---|---|
| | 1 | Roope Korhonen | 90 |
| 2 | 2 | Robert Virves | 75 |
| 1 | 3 | Roberto Daprà | 71 |
| 1 | 4 | Kajetan Kajetanowicz | 62 |
| | 5 | Jan Solans | 55 |

Challenger Co-drivers' Standings
| Move | Pos. | Driver | Points |
|---|---|---|---|
| | 1 | Anssi Viinikka | 90 |
| 1 | 2 | Jakko Viilo | 75 |
| 1 | 3 | Maciej Szczepaniak | 62 |
| | 4 | Luca Guglielmetti | 56 |
| | 5 | Diego Sanjuan de Eusebio | 55 |

=== WRC3 Rally3 ===
==== Classification ====
| Position | | No. | Driver | Co-driver | Entrant | Car | Time | Difference | Points |
| Event | Class | No. | Driver | Co-driver | Entrant | Car | Time | Difference | Points |
|---|---|---|---|---|---|---|---|---|---|
| 17 | 1 | 50 | Matteo Fontana | Alessandro Arnaboldi | Matteo Fontana | Ford Fiesta Rally3 | 3:25:35.7 | 0.0 | 25 |
| 18 | 2 | 51 | Ghjuvanni Rossi | Kylian Sarmezan | Ghjuvanni Rossi | Ford Fiesta Rally3 | 3:27:26.6 | +1:50.9 | 17 |
| 19 | 3 | 56 | Eduardo Castro | Julio Echazú | Eduardo Castro | Ford Fiesta Rally3 | 3:30:42.0 | +5:06.3 | 15 |
| 25 | 4 | 54 | Georgios Vasilakis | Allan Harryman | Georgios Vasilakis | Ford Fiesta Rally3 | 3:45:55.1 | +20:19.4 | 12 |
| 35 | 5 | 52 | Nataniel Bruun | Pablo Olmos | Nataniel Bruun | Ford Fiesta Rally3 | 4:27:39.5 | +1:02:03.8 | 10 |
| 36 | 6 | 53 | André Martinez | Matias Aranguren | André Martinez | Ford Fiesta Rally3 | 4:28:25.0 | +1:02:49.3 | 8 |

==== Special stages ====
| Stage | Winners | Car | Time | Class leaders |
|---|---|---|---|---|
| SD | Bruun / Olmos | Ford Fiesta Rally3 | 2:47.5 | —N/a |
| SS1 | Bruun / Olmos | Ford Fiesta Rally3 | 10:58.0 | Bruun / Olmos |
| SS2 | Bruun / Olmos | Ford Fiesta Rally3 | 12:07.5 | Bruun / Olmos |
| SS3 | Fontana / Arnaboldi | Ford Fiesta Rally3 | 18:00.1 | Fontana / Arnaboldi |
| SS4 | Rossi / Sarmezan | Ford Fiesta Rally3 | 2:00.5 | Fontana / Arnaboldi |
| SS5 | Fontana / Arnaboldi | Ford Fiesta Rally3 | 11:06.9 | Fontana / Arnaboldi |
| SS6 | Fontana / Arnaboldi | Ford Fiesta Rally3 | 12:03.2 | Fontana / Arnaboldi |
| SS7 | Fontana / Arnaboldi | Ford Fiesta Rally3 | 17:57.2 | Fontana / Arnaboldi |
| SS8 | Fontana / Arnaboldi | Ford Fiesta Rally3 | 1:59.6 | Fontana / Arnaboldi |
| SS9 | Fontana / Arnaboldi | Ford Fiesta Rally3 | 11:51.2 | Fontana / Arnaboldi |
| SS10 | Martinez / Aranguren | Ford Fiesta Rally3 | 12:15.7 | Fontana / Arnaboldi |
| SS11 | Rossi / Sarmezan | Ford Fiesta Rally3 | 9:44.1 | Fontana / Arnaboldi |
| SS12 | Fontana / Arnaboldi | Ford Fiesta Rally3 | 1:59.0 | Fontana / Arnaboldi |
| SS13 | Martinez / Aranguren | Ford Fiesta Rally3 | 11:38.6 | Fontana / Arnaboldi |
| SS14 | Martinez / Aranguren | Ford Fiesta Rally3 | 11:57.2 | Fontana / Arnaboldi |
| SS15 | Rossi / Sarmezan | Ford Fiesta Rally3 | 9:36.5 | Fontana / Arnaboldi |
| SS16 | Bruun / Olmos | Ford Fiesta Rally3 | 12:46.0 | Fontana / Arnaboldi |
| SS17 | Bruun / Olmos | Ford Fiesta Rally3 | 11:16.5 | Fontana / Arnaboldi |
| SS18 | Rossi / Sarmezan | Ford Fiesta Rally3 | 13:08.6 | Fontana / Arnaboldi |
| SS19 | Martinez / Aranguren | Ford Fiesta Rally3 | 11:20.8 | Fontana / Arnaboldi |

==== Championship standings ====
Drivers' Standings
| Move | Pos. | Driver | Points |
|---|---|---|---|
| | 1 | Taylor Gill | 92 |
| 1 | 2 | Matteo Fontana | 84 |
| 1 | 3 | Arthur Pelamourges | 60 |
| | 4 | Ali Türkkan | 59 |
| | 5 | Takumi Matsushita | 57 |

Co-drivers' Standings
| Move | Pos. | Driver | Points |
|---|---|---|---|
| | 1 | Daniel Brkic | 92 |
| 1 | 2 | Alessandro Arnaboldi | 84 |
| 1 | 3 | Bastien Pouget | 60 |
| | 4 | Oytun Albaykar | 59 |
| | 5 | Corentin Silvestre | 55 |

| Previous rally: 2025 Rally Finland | 2025 FIA World Rally Championship | Next rally: 2025 Rally Chile |
| Previous rally: 2024 Rally del Paraguay | 2025 Rally del Paraguay | Next rally: 2026 Rally del Paraguay |
