= 2023 British Rally Championship =

Rallying series

The British Rally Championship was a rallying series run over the course of a year, that comprised seven tarmac and gravel surface events. 2023 was the 65th season of the series. The season began in Cumbria on 11 March and was due to conclude on 27/28 October in the Welsh forests.

Following the Trackrod Rally event in September, French driver Adrien Fourmaux and regular co-driver Alexandre Coria were declared champions having won 5 of the 6 events thus far.

== 2023 calendar ==
For season 2023 there were seven events, four on gravel and three on closed road tarmac surfaces.

Round	Dates	Event	Rally HQ	Surface	Website
1	11 March	(England) Malcolm Wilson Rally	Cockermouth	Gravel	(website)
2	26/27 May	(Scotland) Jim Clark Rally	Duns	Tarmac	(website)
3	23/24 June	Ypres Rally Belgium	Ypres, Belgium	Tarmac	(website)
4	18/19 August	(Northern Ireland) Ulster Rally	Newry	Gravel	(website)
5	2/3 September	(Wales) Rali Bae Ceredigion	Aberystwyth	Tarmac	(website)
6	22/23 September	(England) Trackrod Rally Yorkshire	Filey	Gravel	(website)
7	27/28 October	(Wales) Cambrian Rally	Llandudno	Gravel	(website)

== 2023 events podium ==
Round	Rally name	Podium finishers			
Round	Rally name	Placing	Driver / Co-Driver	Car	Time / Diff leader
1	Malcolm Wilson Rally (11 March)	1	Adrien Fourmaux / Alexandre Coria	Ford Fiesta Rally2	42:16.0
1	Malcolm Wilson Rally (11 March)	2	Keith Cronin / Mikie Galvin	Volkswagen Polo GTI R5	+ 00:53.5
1	Malcolm Wilson Rally (11 March)	3	Elliot Payne / Tom Woodburn	Ford Fiesta Rally2	+ 01:22.1
2	Jim Clark Rally (26/27 May)	1	Adrien Fourmaux / Alexandre Coria	Ford Fiesta Rally2	0:57:41.0
2	Jim Clark Rally (26/27 May)	2	Keith Cronin / Mikie Galvin	Volkswagen Polo GTI R5	+ 0:00:29.0
2	Jim Clark Rally (26/27 May)	3	Callum Black / Jack Morton	Ford Fiesta Rally2	+ 0:03:04.7
3	Ypres Rally Belgium (23/24 June)	1	Adrien Fourmaux / Alexandre Coria	Ford Fiesta Rally2	2:02:44.1
3	Ypres Rally Belgium (23/24 June)	2	Dany Vanneste / Kris D'alleine	Volkswagen Polo GTI R5	+01:34.3
3	Ypres Rally Belgium (23/24 June)	3	Garry Pearson / Daniel Barritt	Volkswagen Polo GTI R5	+07:36.0
4	Ulster Rally (18/19 August)	1	Adrien Fourmaux / Alexandre Coria	Ford Fiesta Rally2	1:35:30.9
4	Ulster Rally (18/19 August)	2	Garry Pearson / Daniel Barritt	Volkswagen Polo GTI R5	+04:57.5
4	Ulster Rally (18/19 August)	3	Kyle White / Sean Topping	Peugeot 208 Rally4	+11:18.0
5	Rali Bae Ceredigion (2/3 September)	1	James Williams / Dai Roberts	Hyundai i20 N Rally2	1:25:02.3
5	Rali Bae Ceredigion (2/3 September)	2	Garry Pearson / Daniel Barritt	Volkswagen Polo GTI R5	+03:16.7
5	Rali Bae Ceredigion (2/3 September)	3	Kyle White / Sean Topping	Peugeot 208 Rally4	+08:45.5
6	Trackrod Rally (22/23 September	1	Adrien Fourmaux / Alexandre Coria	Ford Fiesta Rally2	54:18.3
6	Trackrod Rally (22/23 September	2	Garry Pearson / Daniel Barritt	Volkswagen Polo GTI R5	+0:44.6
6	Trackrod Rally (22/23 September	3	Stephen Petch / Michael Wilkinson	Škoda Fabia Rally2 Evo	+2:23.5
7	Cambrian Rally (27/28 October)	1	Garry Pearson / Daniel Barritt	Volkswagen Polo GTI R5	43:46.0
7	Cambrian Rally (27/28 October)	2	Kyle Mcbride / Liam McIntyre	Ford Fiesta Rally4	+1:11.5
7	Cambrian Rally (27/28 October)	3	Kyle White / Sean Topping	Peugeot 208 Rally4	+9:12.3

== 2023 British Rally Championship for Drivers ==
=== Scoring system ===
Points were awarded as follows: 25, 18, 15, 12, 10, 8, 6, 4, 2, 1. Drivers were allowed to nominate one event as their 'joker', on which they will score additional points: 5, 4, 3, 2, 1. For the final round of the Championship, the points total for that rally were doubled (Joker points were not be doubled.) Competitors' five best scores would count towards their championship total.

Position	1st	2nd	3rd	4th	5th	6th	7th	8th	9th	10th
Points	25	18	15	12	10	8	6	4	2	1
Joker Points	5	4	3	2	1					

=== 2023 BRC Championship for Drivers ===
Pos	Driver	MWR	JCR	YPR	ULS	RBC	TRA	CAM	Points
1	Adrien Fourmaux	30*	25	25	25	DNS	25	DNS	130
2	Garry Pearson	8	Ret	15	22*	18	18	50	123
3	Kyle White	1	10	6	15	15	DNS	33*	79
4	Kyle McBride	Ret	2	8	12	Ret	10	36	68
5	James Williams	12	Ret	12	DNS	30*	DNS	DNS	54
Pos	Driver	MWR	JCR	YPR	ULS	RBC	TRA	CAM	Pts

Key
Colour	Result
Gold	Winner
Silver	2nd place
Bronze	3rd place
Green	Non-podium finish
Purple	Did not finish (Ret)
Black	Disqualified (DSQ)
Black	Excluded (EXC)
White	Did not start (DNS)
*	Joker played

=== 2023 BRC Championship for Co-Drivers ===
Pos	Co-Driver	MWR	JCR	YPR	ULS	RBC	TRA	CAM	Points
1	Alexandre Coria	25	25	25	25	DNS	25	DNS	125
2	Sean Topping	1	10	6	15	15	DNS	30	76
3	Daniel Barritt	DNS	Ret	15	18	18	18	DNS	69
4	Liam McIntyre	Ret	2	8	12	Ret	10	36	68
5	Hannah McKillop	8	DNS	DNS	DNS	DNS	DNS	50	58
Pos	Co-Driver	MWR	JCR	YPR	ULS	RBC	TRA	CAM	Pts
