= Henri Warembourg Faculty of Medicine =

Faculty of Medicine of the University of Lille

- Faculté de médecine Henri Warembourg
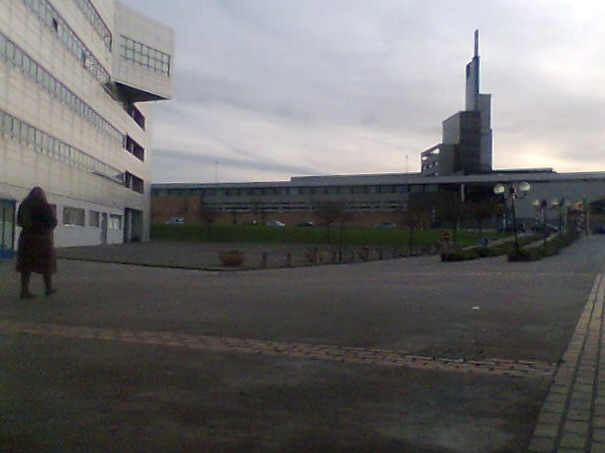
- Photo of the Henri Warembour Faculty of Medicine
- Other name: Faculté de médecine de Lille (Faculty of Medicine of Lille)
- Type: Training and Research Unit
- Established: 1876
- Parent institution: University of Lille
- Director: Marc Hazzan
- Location: 2 Av. Eugène Avinée, 59120 Loos, Lille, France
- Website: medecine.univ-lille.fr/faculte-medecine

The Henri Warembourg Faculty of Medicine or Faculty of Medicine of Lille is a training and research unit located on the University of Lille campus. With more than 12,000 students, it is the largest medical training and research unit in France. It bears the name of Henri Warembourg, former dean of the faculty. It is part of the UFR3S: Health and Sports Sciences.

== Background ==
=== Deans ===
Mandate	Deans
1876 - 1880	Valentin-Bertrand Cazeneuve
1880 - 1889	Emile Wannebroucq
1889 - 1892	Henri Folet
1892 - 1900	Félix de Lapersonne
1900 - 1919	Frédéric Combemale
1919 - 1928	Pr Charmeil
1928 - 1941	Charles Dubois
1941 - 1944	Jules Leclercq
1944 - 1963	Pierre Combemale
1963 - 1969	Henri Warembourg
1982 - 1990	André Fourrier
1990 - 2000	Bernard Devulder
2000 - 2010	Jean-Paul Francke
2010 - 2020	Didier Gosset
2020 - 2021	Dominique Lacroix
Since 2021	Marc Hazzan

== Notable alumni ==
- Iris Mittenaere, model
- Karl Legris, musician
