= List of World Rally Championship driver numbers =

This is a list of seasonally allocated competition numbers that crews of WRC manufacturers opt to use. The option to choose was introduced into the World Rally Championship since 2019. Similar to the regulation that was implemented in Formula One, only the reigning world champion is allowed to use No.1.

== WRC driver numbers ==
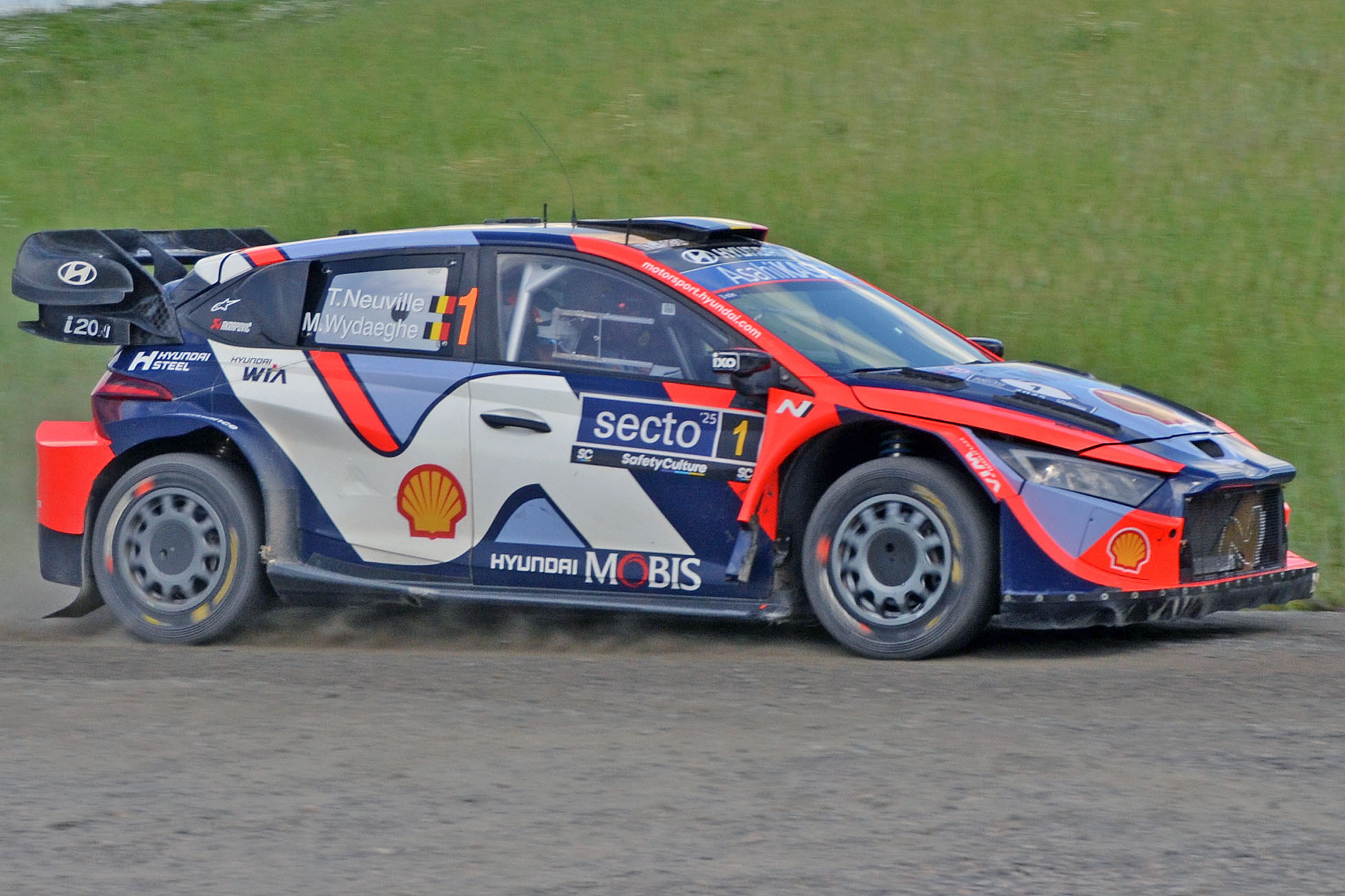
Thierry Neuville during the 2025 Rally Finland, with car number 1 on his Hyundai i20 N Rally1.

No.	Driver	First used	Last used
1	Reserved for champion	2019	2026
2	(Sweden) Oliver Solberg	2021	2022
2	(Portugal) Diogo Salvi	2025	2025
3	(Finland) Teemu Suninen	2019	2023
4	(Finland) Esapekka Lappi	2019	2026
5	(United Kingdom) Kris Meeke	2019	2019
5	(Finland) Sami Pajari	2024	2026
6	(Spain) Dani Sordo	2019	2026
7	(Sweden) Pontus Tidemand	2019	2019
7	(France) Pierre-Louis Loubet	2020	2023
8	(Estonia) Ott Tänak	2019	2025
9	(France) Sébastien Loeb	2020	2020
9	(Norway) Andreas Mikkelsen	2024	2024
9	(Greece) Jourdan Serderidis	2021	2026
10	(Finland) Jari-Matti Latvala	2019	2020
11	(Belgium) Thierry Neuville	2019	2026
13	(Luxembourg) Grégoire Munster	2023	2026
14	(Spain) Nil Solans	2021	2021
16	(Republic of Ireland) Craig Breen	2020	2020
16	(France) Adrien Fourmaux	2021	2026
17	(France) Sébastien Ogier	2019	2025
18	(Republic of Ireland) Craig Breen	2019	2019
18	(Japan) Takamoto Katsuta	2020	2026
19	(France) Sébastien Loeb	2019	2022
19	(Greece) Jourdan Serderidis	2024	2024
20	(New Zealand) Hayden Paddon	2019	2026
20	(Qatar) Nasser Al-Attiyah	2025	2025
21	(Czech Republic) Martin Prokop	2019	2020
22	(Latvia) Mārtiņš Sesks	2024	2026
28	(Chile) Alberto Heller	2023	2025
33	(United Kingdom) Elfyn Evans	2019	2026
37	(Italy) Lorenzo Bertelli	2019	2026
42 (Note: Number retired for 2023 by the Fédération Internationale de l'Automobile following the death of Craig Breen in the pre-event test of the 2023 Croatia Rally.)	(Republic of Ireland) Craig Breen	2019	2023
43 (Note: Number retired for 2023 by the Fédération Internationale de l'Automobile following the death of Ken Block.)	(United States) Ken Block	2019	2019
44	(United Kingdom) Gus Greensmith	2019	2022
55	(Republic of Ireland) Josh McErlean	2025	2026
68	(Finland) Marcus Grönholm	2019	2019
68	(Finland) Jari Huttunen	2022	2022
69	(Finland) Kalle Rovanperä	2020	2025
89	(Norway) Andreas Mikkelsen	2019	2019
95	(Republic of Ireland) Jon Armstrong	2026	2026
96	(Norway) Ole Christian Veiby	2020	2020
97	(Finland) Jari-Matti Latvala	2023	2023
99	(Sweden) Oliver Solberg	2025	2026
