= Rally Chile =

Chilean rally competition

- the first edition logo
- Status: active
- Genre: motorsporting event
- Frequency: annual
- Locations: Concepción, Biobio
- Country: Chile
- Years active: 3
- Inaugurated: 2019
- Website: www.rallymobil.cl

Rally Chile is a rally competition based in Concepción and held throughout the Biobío region of Chile. It was first held in 2018 when it was run as a candidate event as part of a bid to join the World Rally Championship schedule. The candidate event was deemed successful and the rally was added to the 2019 calendar. The rally made Chile the thirty-second country to host the WRC since the championship was launched in 1973.

== Winners ==
| Season | Name | Winning crew | | Team | Car | Ref |
|---|---|---|---|---|---|---|
| 2019 | 1. Copec Rally Chile | (Estonia) Ott Tänak | (Estonia) Martin Järveoja | (Japan) Toyota Gazoo Racing WRT | Toyota Yaris WRC | |
| 2020 | —N/a | Cancelled due to the Chilean protests. | | | | |
| 2021 | —N/a | Cancelled due to the COVID-19 pandemic. | | | | |
| 2022 | Not held | | | | | |
| 2023 | 2. Rally Chile BIOBÍO | (Estonia) Ott Tänak | (Estonia) Martin Järveoja | (United Kingdom) M-Sport World Rally Team | Ford Puma Rally1 | |
| 2024 | 3. Rally Chile BIOBÍO | (Finland) Kalle Rovanperä | (Finland) Jonne Halttunen | (Japan) Toyota Gazoo Racing WRT | Toyota GR Yaris Rally1 | |
| 2025 | 4. Rally Chile BIOBÍO | (France) Sébastien Ogier | (France) Vincent Landais | (Japan) Toyota Gazoo Racing WRT | Toyota GR Yaris Rally1 | |
