= 2025 World Rally Championship =

53rd running of the World Rally Championship

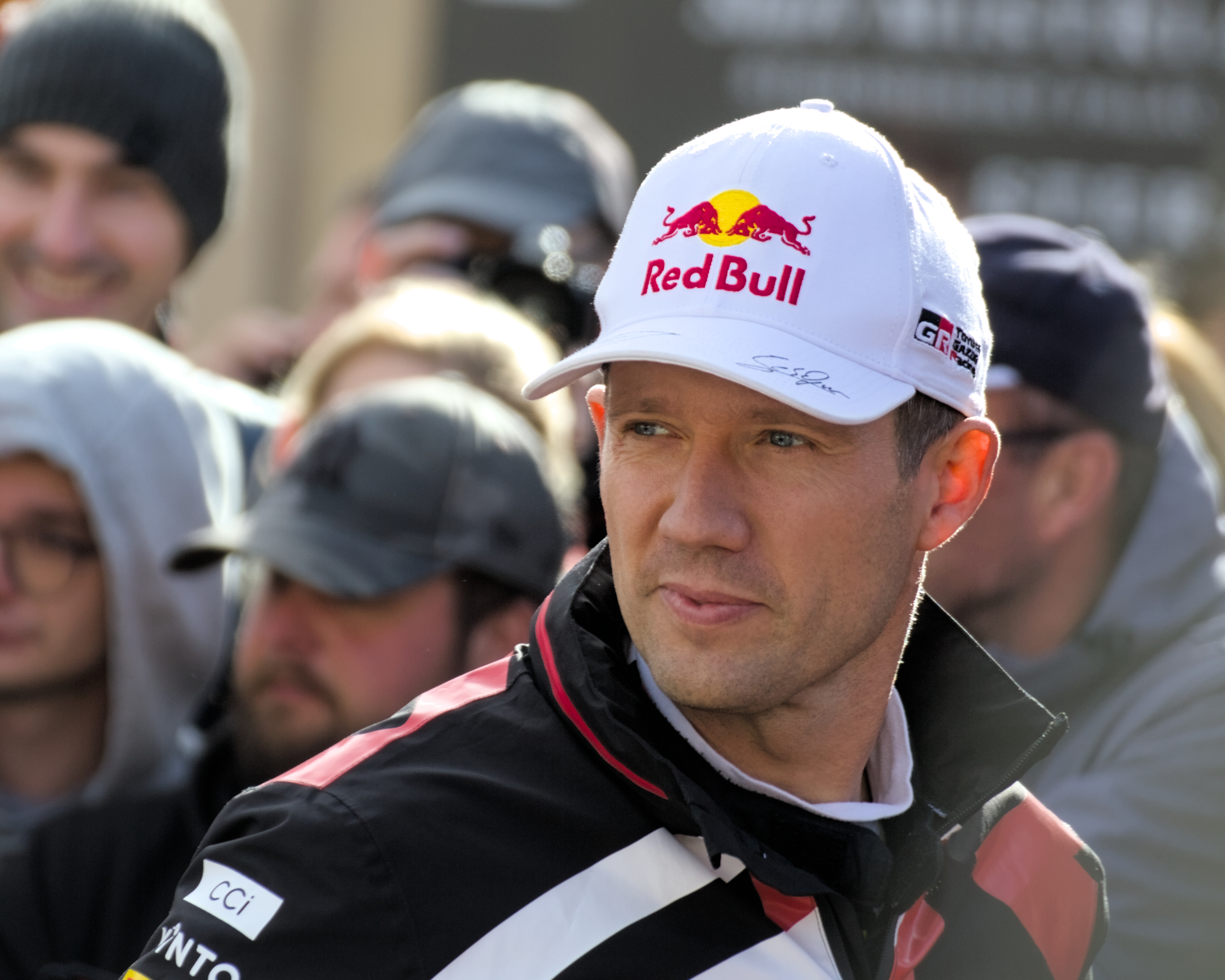
Sébastien Ogier won his ninth drivers' championship title, equalling the record for the most Championships in the WRC.

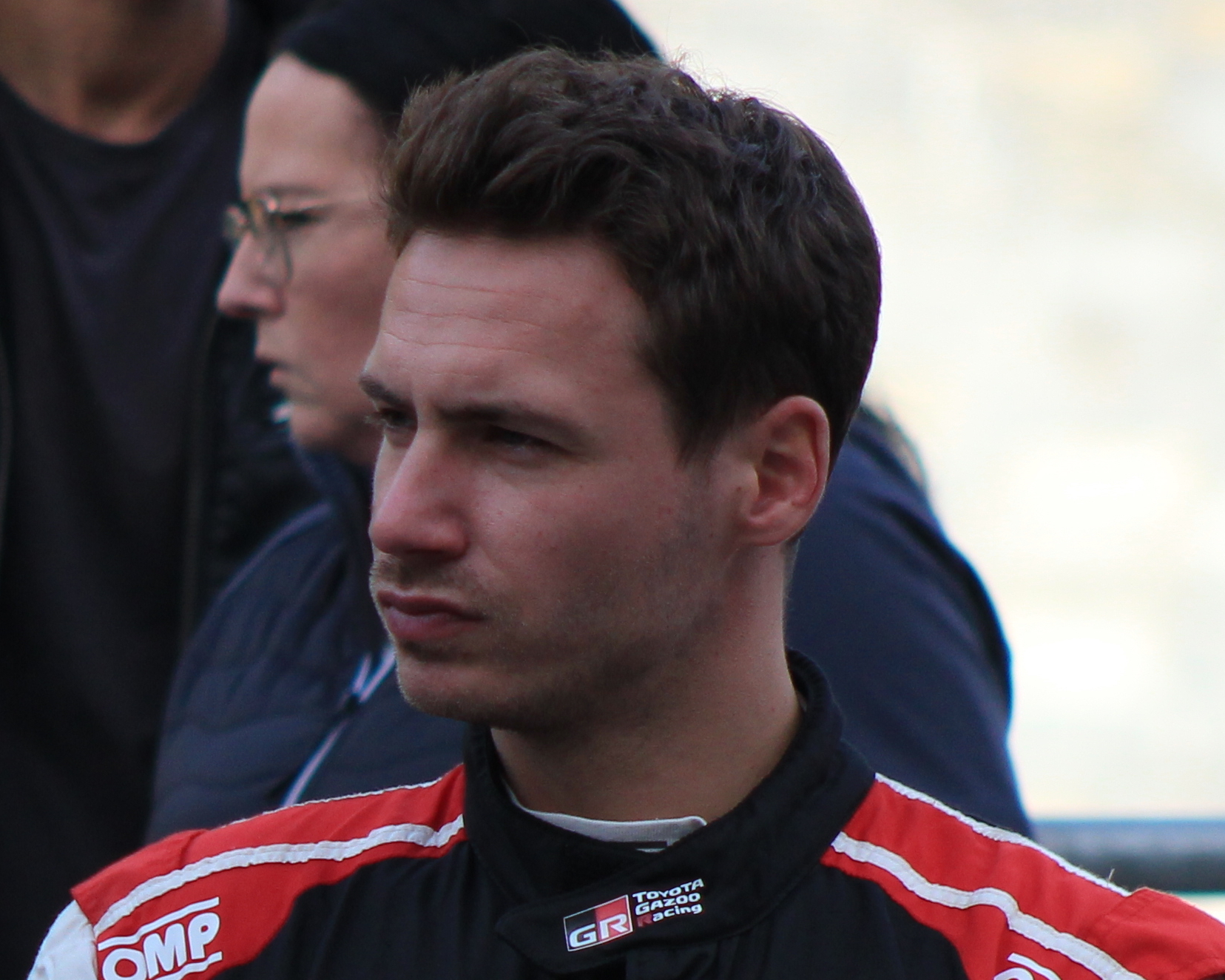
Vincent Landais won his first co-drivers' championship title.

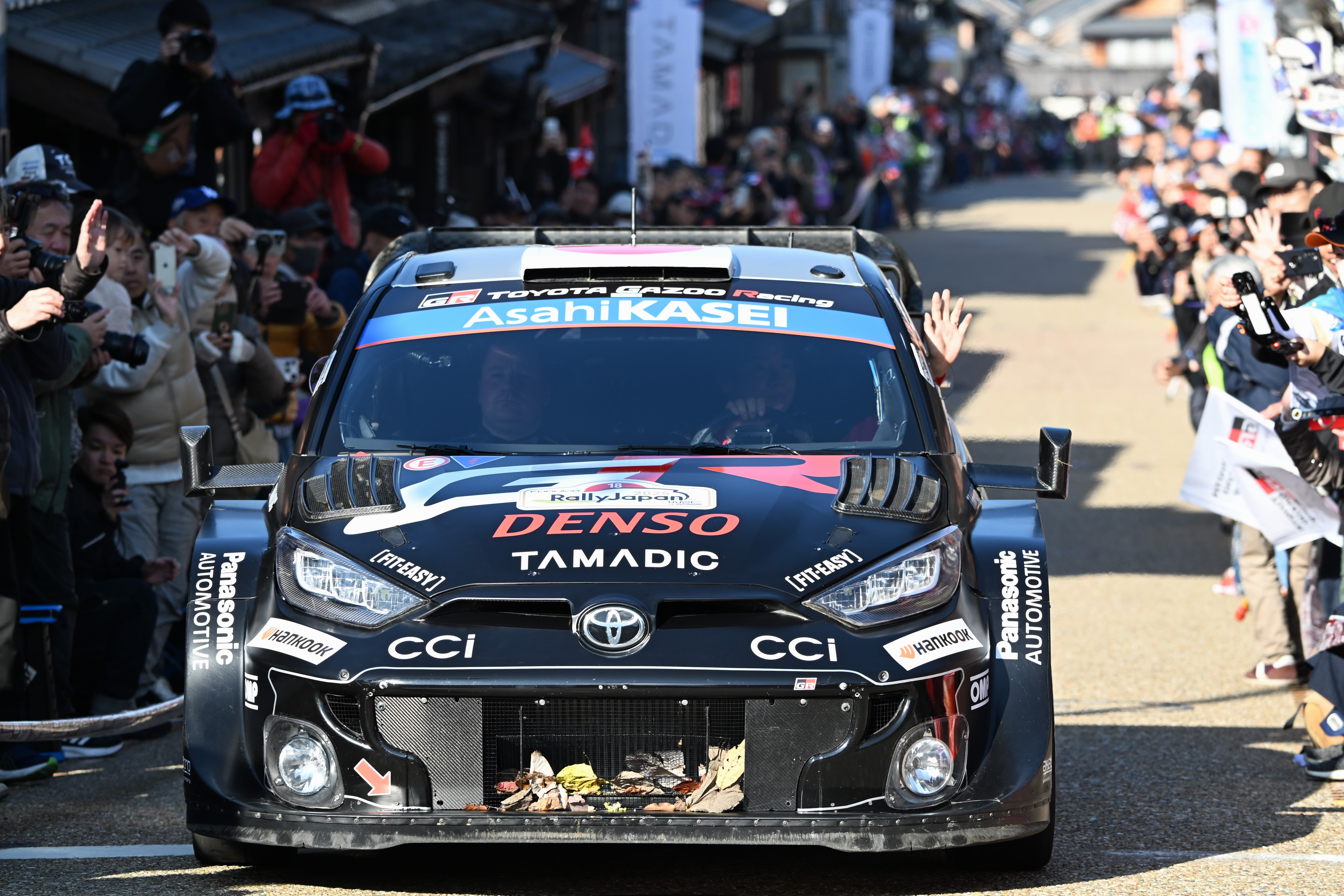
Toyota Gazoo Racing WRT (GR Yaris Rally1 pictured) were the manufacturers' champions.

The 2025 FIA World Rally Championship was the 53rd season of the World Rally Championship, an international rallying series organised by the Fédération Internationale de l'Automobile (FIA) and WRC Promoter GmbH. Teams and crews compete for the World Rally Championships for Drivers, Co-drivers and Manufacturers. Crews were free to compete in cars complying with Groups Rally1 to Rally5 regulations; however, only manufacturers competing with Rally1 cars were eligible to score points in the manufacturers' championship. The championship began in January 2025 with the Monte Carlo Rally and concluded in November 2025 with the calendar newcomer Rally Saudi Arabia. The series was supported by the WRC2 and WRC3 categories at every round of the championship and by Junior WRC at selected events.

Thierry Neuville and Martijn Wydaeghe were the reigning drivers' and co-drivers' champions, having secured their first championship titles at the 2024 Rally Japan. Toyota were the defending manufacturers' champions.

At the conclusion of the championship, Sébastien Ogier and Vincent Landais won the World Rally Championship titles at the 2025 Rally Saudi Arabia. It was Ogier's ninth title, which tied him with Sébastien Loeb for the most championships won, and Landais' first. Elfyn Evans and Scott Martin were second, trailing by four points. Kalle Rovanperä and Jonne Halttunen were third, a further twenty-one points behind. In the manufacturers' championship, Toyota Gazoo Racing WRT successfully defended their title, holding a 224-point advantage over Hyundai Shell Mobis WRT, with M-Sport Ford WRT in third.

== Calendar ==
The 2025 season was contested over fourteen rounds across Europe, Africa, South America and Asia.

Round	Start date	Finish date	Rally	Rally headquarters	Surface	Stages	Distance	Ref.
1	23 January	26 January	(Monaco) Rallye Automobile Monte Carlo	Gap, Provence-Alpes-Côte d'Azur, France	Mixed (Note: The Monte Carlo Rally is run on a tarmac and snow surface.)	18	343.80 km	
2	13 February	16 February	Rally Sweden	Umeå, Västerbotten County, Sweden	Snow	18	300.22 km	
3	20 March	23 March	Safari Rally Kenya	Nairobi, Nairobi County, Kenya	Gravel	21	383.10 km	
4	24 April	27 April	(Spain) Rally Islas Canarias	Las Palmas, Gran Canaria, Spain	Tarmac	18	301.30 km	
5	15 May	18 May	Rally de Portugal	Matosinhos, Porto, Portugal	Gravel	24	344.50 km	
6	5 June	8 June	(Italy) Rally Italia Sardegna	Olbia, Sardinia, Italy	Gravel	16	320.24 km	
7	26 June	29 June	Acropolis Rally Greece	Lamia, Central Greece, Greece	Gravel	17	345.76 km	
8	17 July	20 July	Rally Estonia	Tartu, Tartu County, Estonia	Gravel	20	308.35 km	
9	31 July	3 August	Rally Finland	Jyväskylä, Central Finland, Finland	Gravel	20	307.22 km	
10	28 August	31 August	Rally del Paraguay	Encarnación, Itapúa, Paraguay	Gravel	19	333.18 km	
11	11 September	14 September	Rally Chile	Concepción, Biobío, Chile	Gravel	16	306.76 km	
12	16 October	19 October	(Europe) Central European Rally	Bad Griesbach, Bavaria, Germany	Tarmac	18	306.08 km	
13	6 November	9 November	Rally Japan	Toyota, Aichi, Japan	Tarmac	20	305.34 km	
14	26 November	29 November	Rally Saudi Arabia	Jeddah, Mecca Province, Saudi Arabia	Gravel	17	319.44 km	

A map showing the locations of the rallies in the 2025 championship. Event headquarters are marked with black dots.

=== Calendar changes ===
The calendar was expanded to fourteen rounds, including five flyaway events. This was originally planned for the 2024 season, but WRC Promoter GmbH retained the total of thirteen events in the hopes of attracting more Rally1 entries.

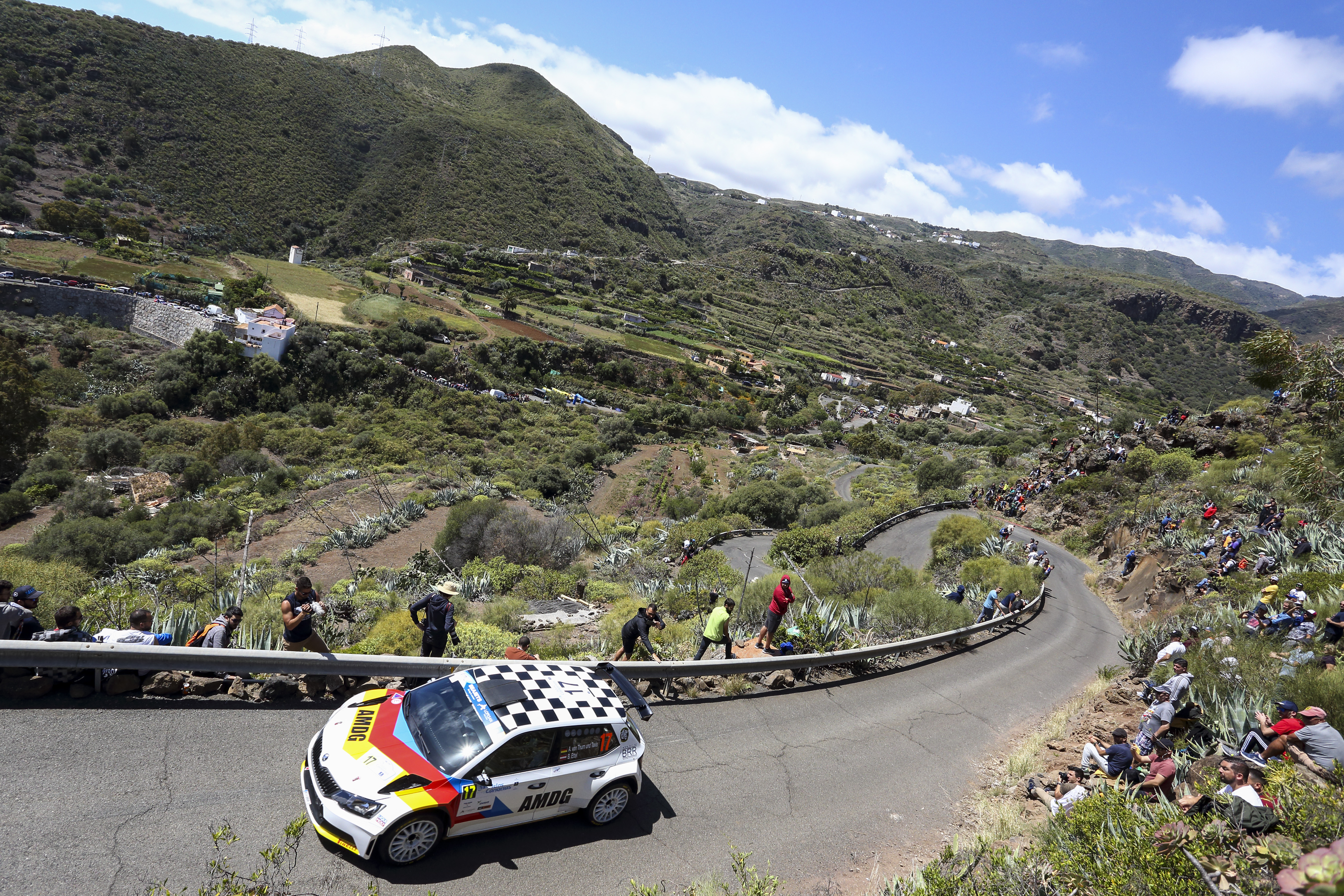
Rally Islas Canarias joined the WRC calendar.

- Rally Estonia returned to the championship after missing the 2024 season. The event replaced Rally Latvia on the calendar.
- Rally Islas Canarias was promoted from the European Rally Championship and became a World Championship event under a two-year deal. The event ran on tarmac roads.
- Rally Saudi Arabia joined the championship calendar after signing a ten-year contract with WRC Promoter GmbH. The rally was based in Jeddah, and was the season finale.
- Rally del Paraguay became a WRC event from 2025 after signing a multi-year deal, making Paraguay the thirty-eighth nation to host a WRC championship round.
- The Croatia Rally was not featured on the calendar for the first time since the event joined the championship in 2021. However, the event is set to return in 2026.
- Rally Poland was also removed from the calendar after making a one-year return to the championship in 2024.

== Entrants ==
The following manufacturers contested the championship under Rally1 regulations.

Rally1 entries eligible to score manufacturer points
Manufacturer	Entrant	Car	No.	Driver name	Co-driver name	Rounds
Ford	(United Kingdom) M-Sport Ford WRT	Ford Puma Rally1	13	(Luxembourg) Grégoire Munster	(Belgium) Louis Louka	All
Ford	(United Kingdom) M-Sport Ford WRT	Ford Puma Rally1	55	(Republic of Ireland) Josh McErlean	(Republic of Ireland) Eoin Treacy	All
Hyundai	(South Korea) Hyundai Shell Mobis WRT	Hyundai i20 N Rally1	1	(Belgium) Thierry Neuville	(Belgium) Martijn Wydaeghe	All
Hyundai	(South Korea) Hyundai Shell Mobis WRT	Hyundai i20 N Rally1	8	(Estonia) Ott Tänak	(Estonia) Martin Järveoja	1–11
Hyundai	(South Korea) Hyundai Shell Mobis WRT	Hyundai i20 N Rally1	16	(France) Adrien Fourmaux	(France) Alexandre Coria	All
Toyota	(Japan) Toyota Gazoo Racing WRT	Toyota GR Yaris Rally1	17	(France) Sébastien Ogier	(France) Vincent Landais	1, 4–7, 9–14
Toyota	(Japan) Toyota Gazoo Racing WRT	Toyota GR Yaris Rally1	18	(Japan) Takamoto Katsuta	(Republic of Ireland) Aaron Johnston	2–3, 8
Toyota	(Japan) Toyota Gazoo Racing WRT	Toyota GR Yaris Rally1	33	(United Kingdom) Elfyn Evans	(United Kingdom) Scott Martin	All
Toyota	(Japan) Toyota Gazoo Racing WRT	Toyota GR Yaris Rally1	69	(Finland) Kalle Rovanperä	(Finland) Jonne Halttunen	All
Toyota	(Japan) Toyota Gazoo Racing WRT2	Toyota GR Yaris Rally1	5	(Finland) Sami Pajari	(Finland) Marko Salminen	All

The following crews entered in Rally1 cars as privateers or under arrangement with the manufacturers.

Rally1 entries ineligible to score manufacturer points
Manufacturer	Entrant	Car	No.	Driver name	Co-driver name	Rounds
Ford	(United Kingdom) M-Sport Ford WRT	Ford Puma Rally1	2	(Portugal) Diogo Salvi	(Spain) Axel Coronado	5
Ford	(United Kingdom) M-Sport Ford WRT	Ford Puma Rally1	9	(Greece) Jourdan Serderidis	(Belgium) Frédéric Miclotte	2–3, 6–7
Ford	(United Kingdom) M-Sport Ford WRT	Ford Puma Rally1	20	(Qatar) Nasser Al-Attiyah	(Spain) Cándido Carrera	14
Ford	(United Kingdom) M-Sport Ford WRT	Ford Puma Rally1	22	(Latvia) Mārtiņš Sesks	(Latvia) Renārs Francis	2, 5–9, 14
Ford	(United Kingdom) M-Sport Ford WRT	Ford Puma Rally1	28	(Chile) Alberto Heller	(Argentina) Luis Allende	11
Hyundai	(South Korea) Hyundai Shell Mobis WRT	Hyundai i20 N Rally1	8	(Estonia) Ott Tänak	(Estonia) Martin Järveoja	12–14
Toyota	(Japan) Toyota Gazoo Racing WRT	Toyota GR Yaris Rally1	18	(Japan) Takamoto Katsuta	(Republic of Ireland) Aaron Johnston	1, 4–7, 9–14
Toyota	(Japan) Toyota Gazoo Racing WRT	Toyota GR Yaris Rally1	37	(Italy) Lorenzo Bertelli	(Italy) Simone Scattolin	~~2~~
Toyota	(Japan) Toyota Gazoo Racing WRT	Toyota GR Yaris Rally1	99	(Sweden) Oliver Solberg	(United Kingdom) Elliott Edmondson	8

=== In detail ===
M-Sport retained the crew of Grégoire Munster and Louis Louka for another complete season. They were joined by Josh McErlean and Eoin Treacy as the team's second full-time crew, in collaboration with Motorsport Ireland Rally Academy. The crew of Mārtiņš Sesks and Renārs Francis also competed on a part-time basis, with the pair starting their season at Rally Sweden.

Hyundai team chief Cyril Abiteboul confirmed in July 2024 that Ott Tänak and Martin Järveoja would continue driving for their team in 2025. Thierry Neuville and Martijn Wydaeghe also extended their contract for one year with the team. They drove with competition number 1, a right earned by their 2024 championship title win. Adrien Fourmaux and Alexandre Coria moved from M-Sport to drive a third car for the full season.

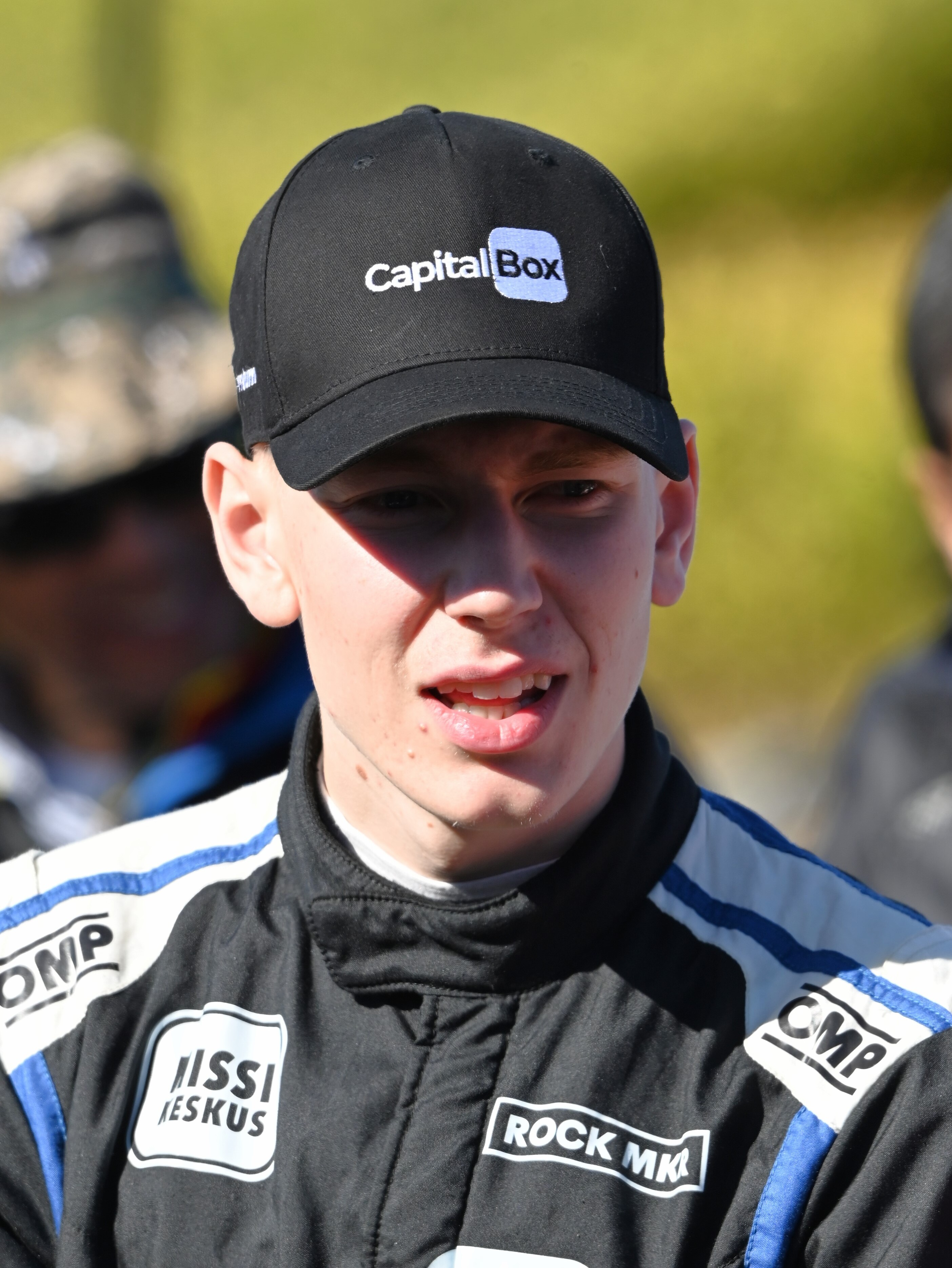
Sami Pajari was promoted to the top tier by Toyota Gazoo Racing WRT to contest a full season.

Toyota retained the crew of Kalle Rovanperä and Jonne Halttunen, who returned full-time after a partial season in 2024. They joined the crews of Elfyn Evans and Scott Martin, and Takamoto Katsuta and Aaron Johnston as the team's full-time competitors. Newly-crowned WRC2 champion Sami Pajari, who had also ran selected rallies with the team in a Rally1 car in 2024, was signed with a full-time programme with the team. However, he would be joined with new co-driver Marko Salminen, following the departure of Enni Mälkönen. Sébastien Ogier and Vincent Landais continued to run a partial season with the team.

== Regulation changes ==
=== Technical regulations ===
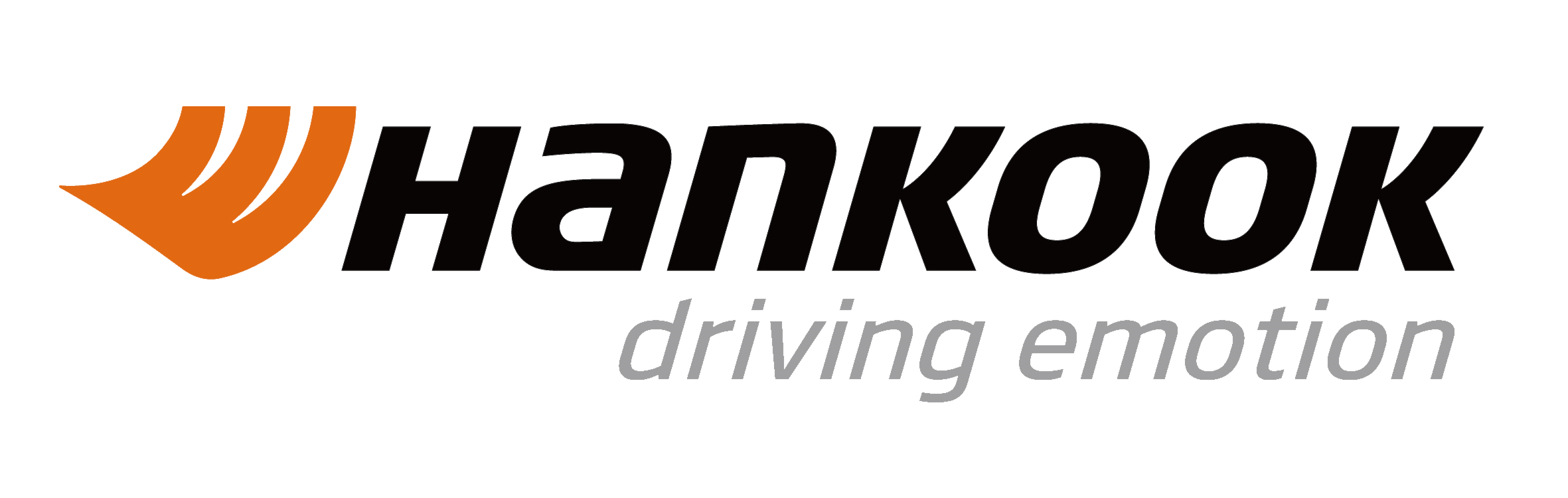
Hankook (top) have replaced Pirelli (bottom) as the new official tyre supplier.

South Korean tyre manufacturer Hankook became the official tyre supplier of the championship, providing tyres to all entrants of four wheel drive cars. The company replaced Pirelli, who supplied tyres to the championship between 2021 and 2024. Under the terms of the agreement with WRC Promoter, Hankook will supply tyres until the end of the 2027 championship.

Ahead of the season, it was announced Rally1 cars would no longer use the hybrid system introduced in 2022. The minimum weight of the cars and the width of the air intake was also reduced to compensate for the change so that cars maintain the same power-to-weight ratio that they had when using the hybrid system. The decision was made to relieve concerns of the increasing costs of repairing the hybrid system.

=== Sporting regulations ===
The points distribution system was revised for the second consecutive season following widespread criticism of the 2024 point system. Points were awarded based on the general top ten classification at the end of the rally in a scale of 25–17–15–12–10–8–6–4–2–1, with additional points awarded to the five fastest crews on Sunday, with further points for the five fastest crews in the Power Stage. Points awarded on the general classification after Saturday had finished as in 2024, were dropped.

== Season report ==
=== Opening rounds ===
The 2025 championship commenced with the Monte Carlo Rally, held in changeable conditions. Sébastien Ogier and co-driver Vincent Landais took victory, fending off a late challenge from the Hyundai crew of Adrien Fourmaux and Alexandre Coria. This was Ogier's tenth victory at Monte Carlo—nine in the WRC and one in the IRC. At the following round in Sweden, the Toyota car of Elfyn Evans and Scott Martin won by 3.8 seconds over Takamoto Katsuta and Aaron Johnston (also Toyota), giving Evans a twenty-eight-point lead in the drivers' championship. At the Safari Rally in Kenya, the early leader was the Hyundai of Ott Tänak and Martin Järveoja, however a driveshaft failure on Friday's second loop forced them to retire. Evans and Martin inherited the lead and held it until the finish, extending their championship lead to thirty-six points. Katsuta and Johnston, who had been running second, rolled their Yaris on the final Power Stage; although they finished the stage, the car was too damaged to continue, forcing their retirement. At the inaugural Rally Islas Canarias, Toyota dominated by taking the top four positions. Kalle Rovanperä and Jonne Halttunen won their first event of the season, having set the fastest time on fifteen of the eighteen special stages.

=== Mid-season gravel events ===
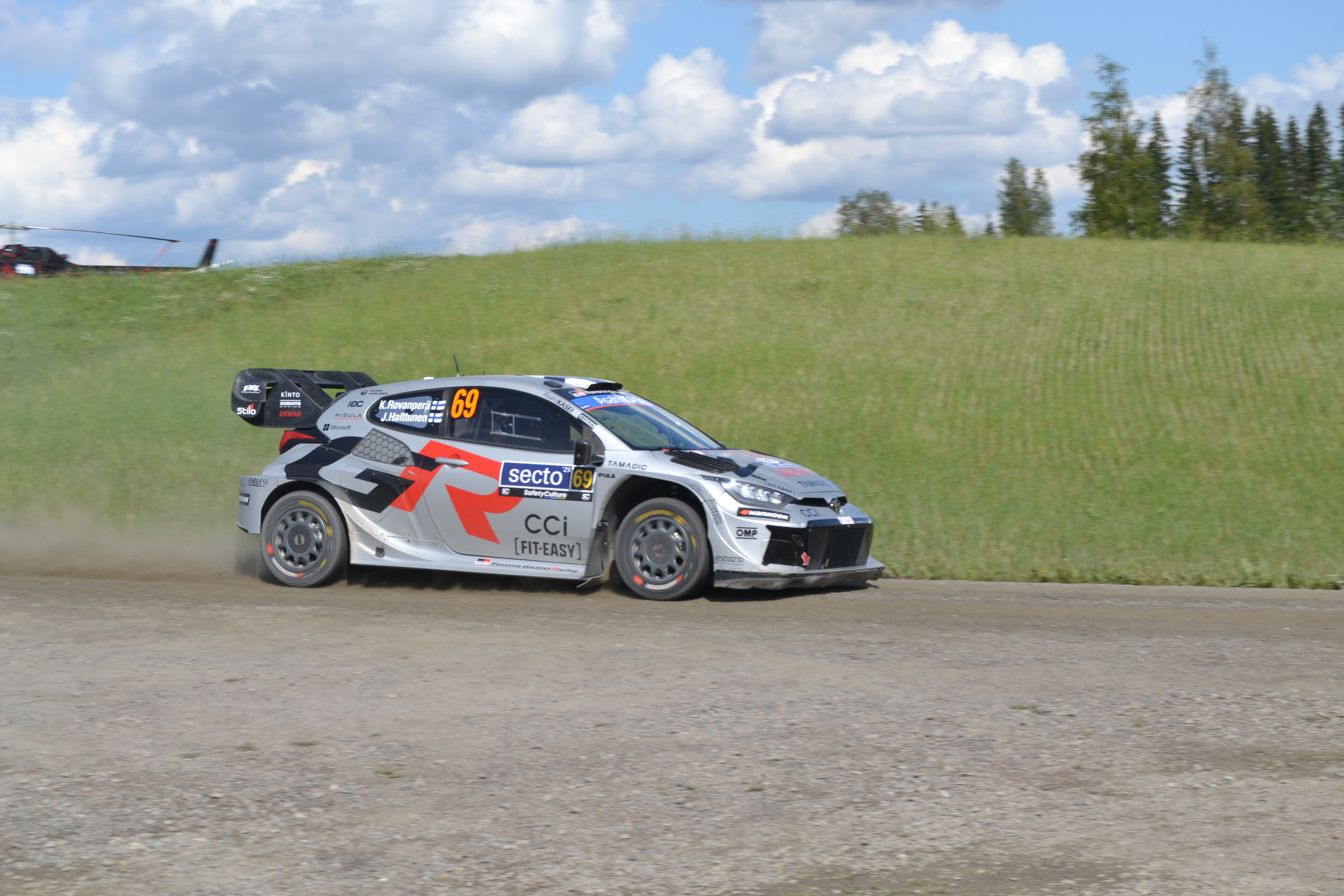
Kalle Rovanperä and Jonne Halttunen won their home rally, Rally Finland, for the first time in their careers.

Toyota's dominance continued on gravel at the Rally de Portugal. Ogier and Landais secured their seventh win at the event, extending their own record. Their closest rival, the Hyundai i20 of Tänak and Järveoja, experienced a power steering failure. Ogier also won the Sardinia Rally for the fifth time, setting a record for that event. Hyundai finally won a stage when Tänak and Järveoja triumphed at the Acropolis Rally in Greece. At Rally Estonia, Oliver Solberg and Elliott Edmondson returned to the Rally1 category with Toyota, having been dropped by Hyundai after the 2022 season, surprising other teams by claiming their maiden Rally1 victory. At Rally Finland, the five Toyota cars took the top five places. Rovanperä and Halttunen secured their first victory at their home event, taking them within three points of the championship lead. The championship then moved to South America, where Ogier and Landais won the inaugural Rally del Paraguay, bringing them to nine points behind to the championship leader. The pair also won Rally Chile, taking them into the championship lead.

=== Closing rounds ===
At the Central European Rally, Rovanperä and Halttunen secured their third win of the season, shortly after Rovanperä announced he would retire from WRC at the end of the season. Ogier and Landais had been leading but crashed out, allowing Evans and Martin to finish second, which was sufficient to reclaim the championship lead. This 1–2 finish also secured Toyota their fifth consecutive manufacturers' world title. Ogier and Landais responded with their sixth win of the season at a rain-hit Rally Japan, reducing the championship lead to three points with one event remaining.

The championship was decided at the inaugural Rally Saudi Arabia. The rally was won by the outgoing champions Thierry Neuville and Martijn Wydaeghe, who led a Hyundai 1–2 finish ahead of teammates Fourmaux and Coria. Ogier and Landais finished third, ahead of Evans and Martin in sixth, gaining seven points more – enough to take the world title. This was Ogier's ninth world championship, equalling Sébastien Loeb's record.

== Results and standings ==
=== Season summary ===
Round	Event	Winning driver	Winning co-driver	Winning entrant	Winning time	Report	Ref.
1	(Monaco) Rallye Automobile Monte Carlo	(France) Sébastien Ogier	(France) Vincent Landais	(Japan) Toyota Gazoo Racing WRT	3:19:06.2	Report	
2	Rally Sweden	(United Kingdom) Elfyn Evans	(United Kingdom) Scott Martin	(Japan) Toyota Gazoo Racing WRT	2:33:39.2	Report	
3	Safari Rally Kenya	(United Kingdom) Elfyn Evans	(United Kingdom) Scott Martin	(Japan) Toyota Gazoo Racing WRT	4:20:03.8	Report	
4	(Spain) Rally Islas Canarias	(Finland) Kalle Rovanperä	(Finland) Jonne Halttunen	(Japan) Toyota Gazoo Racing WRT	2:54:39.8	Report	
5	Rally de Portugal	(France) Sébastien Ogier	(France) Vincent Landais	(Japan) Toyota Gazoo Racing WRT	3:48:35.9	Report	
6	(Italy) Rally Italia Sardegna	(France) Sébastien Ogier	(France) Vincent Landais	(Japan) Toyota Gazoo Racing WRT	3:34:24.5	Report	
7	Acropolis Rally Greece	(Estonia) Ott Tänak	(Estonia) Martin Järveoja	(South Korea) Hyundai Shell Mobis WRT	4:12:20.1	Report	
8	Rally Estonia	(Sweden) Oliver Solberg	(United Kingdom) Elliott Edmondson	(Japan) Toyota Gazoo Racing WRT	2:36:35.1	Report	
9	Rally Finland	(Finland) Kalle Rovanperä	(Finland) Jonne Halttunen	(Japan) Toyota Gazoo Racing WRT	2:21:51.4	Report	
10	Rally del Paraguay	(France) Sébastien Ogier	(France) Vincent Landais	(Japan) Toyota Gazoo Racing WRT	3:00:06.6	Report	
11	Rally Chile	(France) Sébastien Ogier	(France) Vincent Landais	(Japan) Toyota Gazoo Racing WRT	2:55:42.1	Report	
12	(Europe) Central European Rally	(Finland) Kalle Rovanperä	(Finland) Jonne Halttunen	(Japan) Toyota Gazoo Racing WRT	2:36:20.1	Report	
13	Rally Japan	(France) Sébastien Ogier	(France) Vincent Landais	(Japan) Toyota Gazoo Racing WRT	3:21:08.9	Report	
14	Rally Saudi Arabia	(Belgium) Thierry Neuville	(Belgium) Martijn Wydaeghe	(South Korea) Hyundai Shell Mobis WRT	3:21:17.3	Report	

=== Scoring system ===
Points were awarded to the top ten classified finishers in each event. In the manufacturers' championship, teams were eligible to nominate three crews to score points, but these points were only awarded to the top two classified finishers representing a manufacturer and driving a 2025-specification Rally1 car. There were also five bonus points awarded to the winners in an accumulated standings across all Sunday stages, four points for second place, three for third, two for fourth and one for fifth. The same points scale was awarded to the five fastest crews of the Power Stage as well.

Position	1st	2nd	3rd	4th	5th	6th	7th	8th	9th	10th
Overall	25	17	15	12	10	8	6	4	2	1
Sunday	5	4	3	2	1	—N/a				
Power Stage	5	4	3	2	1	—N/a				

=== FIA World Rally Championship for Drivers ===
The driver who recorded a points-scoring classification would be taken into account for the championship regardless of the categories.

Pos.	Driver	MON (Monaco)	SWE (Sweden)	KEN (Kenya)	ESP (Spain)	POR (Portugal)	ITA (Italy)	GRE (Greece)	EST (Estonia)	FIN (Finland)	PAR (Paraguay)	CHL (Chile)	EUR (Europe)	JPN (Japan)	SAU (Saudi Arabia)	Points
1	(France) Sébastien Ogier															293
2	(United Kingdom) Elfyn Evans															289
3	(Finland) Kalle Rovanperä															256
4	(Estonia) Ott Tänak															216
5	(Belgium) Thierry Neuville															194
6	(Japan) Takamoto Katsuta															122
7	(France) Adrien Fourmaux															115
8	(Finland) Sami Pajari															107
9	(Sweden) Oliver Solberg															71
10	(Luxembourg) Grégoire Munster															40
11	(Republic of Ireland) Josh McErlean															28
12	(Latvia) Mārtiņš Sesks															16
13	(France) Yohan Rossel															16
14	(United Kingdom) Gus Greensmith															14
15	(Bulgaria) Nikolay Gryazin															12
16	(Spain) Jan Solans															7
17	(Spain) Alejandro Cachón															7
18	(Greece) Jourdan Serderidis															4
19	(Poland) Kajetan Kajetanowicz															3
20	(Paraguay) Fabrizio Zaldivar															3
21	(Italy) Roberto Daprà															2
22	(Czech Republic) Jan Černý															2
23	(Finland) Roope Korhonen															1
24	(France) Eric Camilli															1
25	(Czech Republic) Filip Mareš															1
Pos.	Driver	MON (Monaco)	SWE (Sweden)	KEN (Kenya)	ESP (Spain)	POR (Portugal)	ITA (Italy)	GRE (Greece)	EST (Estonia)	FIN (Finland)	PAR (Paraguay)	CHL (Chile)	EUR (Europe)	JPN (Japan)	SAU (Saudi Arabia)	Points

Key
Colour	Result
Gold	Winner
Silver	2nd place
Bronze	3rd place
Green	Top 10 finish
Blue	Non-top 10 finish
Blue	Non-classified finish (NC)
Purple	Did not finish (Ret)
Black	Excluded (EX)
Black	Disqualified (DSQ)
White	Did not start (DNS)
White	Cancelled (C)
Blank	Withdrew entry from the event (WD)

Notes:
Main script – Final position
Text below – Points scored from overall, Sunday and the Power Stage

=== FIA World Rally Championship for Co-Drivers ===
The co-driver who recorded a points-scoring classification would be taken into account for the championship regardless of the categories.

Pos.	Co-driver	MON (Monaco)	SWE (Sweden)	KEN (Kenya)	ESP (Spain)	POR (Portugal)	ITA (Italy)	GRE (Greece)	EST (Estonia)	FIN (Finland)	PAR (Paraguay)	CHL (Chile)	EUR (Europe)	JPN (Japan)	SAU (Saudi Arabia)	Points
1	(France) Vincent Landais															293
2	(United Kingdom) Scott Martin															289
3	(Finland) Jonne Halttunen															256
4	(Estonia) Martin Järveoja															216
5	(Belgium) Martijn Wydaeghe															194
6	(Republic of Ireland) Aaron Johnston															122
7	(France) Alexandre Coria															115
8	(Finland) Marko Salminen															107
9	(United Kingdom) Elliott Edmondson															71
10	(Belgium) Louis Louka															40
11	(Republic of Ireland) Eoin Treacy															28
12	(Latvia) Renārs Francis															16
13	(France) Arnaud Dunand															16
14	(Sweden) Jonas Andersson															14
15	(Kyrgyzstan) Konstantin Aleksandrov															12
16	(Spain) Rodrigo Sanjuan de Eusebio															7
17	(Spain) Borja Rozada															7
18	(Belgium) Frédéric Miclotte															4
19	(Poland) Maciej Szczepaniak															3
20	(Italy) Marcelo Der Ohannesian															3
21	(Italy) Luca Guglielmetti															2
22	(Czech Republic) Ondřej Krajča															2
23	(Finland) Anssi Viinikka															1
24	(France) Thibault de la Haye															1
25	(Czech Republic) Radovan Bucha															1
Pos.	Co-driver	MON (Monaco)	SWE (Sweden)	KEN (Kenya)	ESP (Spain)	POR (Portugal)	ITA (Italy)	GRE (Greece)	EST (Estonia)	FIN (Finland)	PAR (Paraguay)	CHL (Chile)	EUR (Europe)	JPN (Japan)	SAU (Saudi Arabia)	Points

Key
Colour	Result
Gold	Winner
Silver	2nd place
Bronze	3rd place
Green	Top 10 finish
Blue	Non-top 10 finish
Blue	Non-classified finish (NC)
Purple	Did not finish (Ret)
Black	Excluded (EX)
Black	Disqualified (DSQ)
White	Did not start (DNS)
White	Cancelled (C)
Blank	Withdrew entry from the event (WD)

Notes:
Main script – Final position
Text below – Points scored from overall, Sunday and the Power Stage

=== FIA World Rally Championship for Manufacturers ===
Only the best two results of each manufacturer in the respective overall classification by the end of each rally, accumulated position of all Sunday stages and Power Stage at each rally were taken into account for the championship.

Pos.	Manufacturer	MON (Monaco)	SWE (Sweden)	KEN (Kenya)	ESP (Spain)	POR (Portugal)	ITA (Italy)	GRE (Greece)	EST (Estonia)	FIN (Finland)	PAR (Paraguay)	CHL (Chile)	EUR (Europe)	JPN (Japan)	SAU (Saudi Arabia)	Points
1	(Japan) Toyota Gazoo Racing WRT															735
2	(South Korea) Hyundai Shell Mobis WRT															511
3	(United Kingdom) M-Sport Ford WRT															205
4	(Japan) Toyota Gazoo Racing WRT2															158
Pos.	Manufacturer	MON (Monaco)	SWE (Sweden)	KEN (Kenya)	ESP (Spain)	POR (Portugal)	ITA (Italy)	GRE (Greece)	EST (Estonia)	FIN (Finland)	PAR (Paraguay)	CHL (Chile)	EUR (Europe)	JPN (Japan)	SAU (Saudi Arabia)	Points

Key
Colour	Result
Gold	Winner
Silver	2nd place
Bronze	3rd place
Green	Top 10 finish
Blue	Non-top 10 finish
Blue	Non-classified finish (NC)
Purple	Did not finish (Ret)
Black	Excluded (EX)
Black	Disqualified (DSQ)
White	Did not start (DNS)
White	Cancelled (C)
Blank	Withdrew entry from the event (WD)

Notes:
Main script – Final position
Text below – Points scored from overall, Sunday and the Power Stage
