= 2024 World Rally Championship =

52nd running of the World Rally Championship

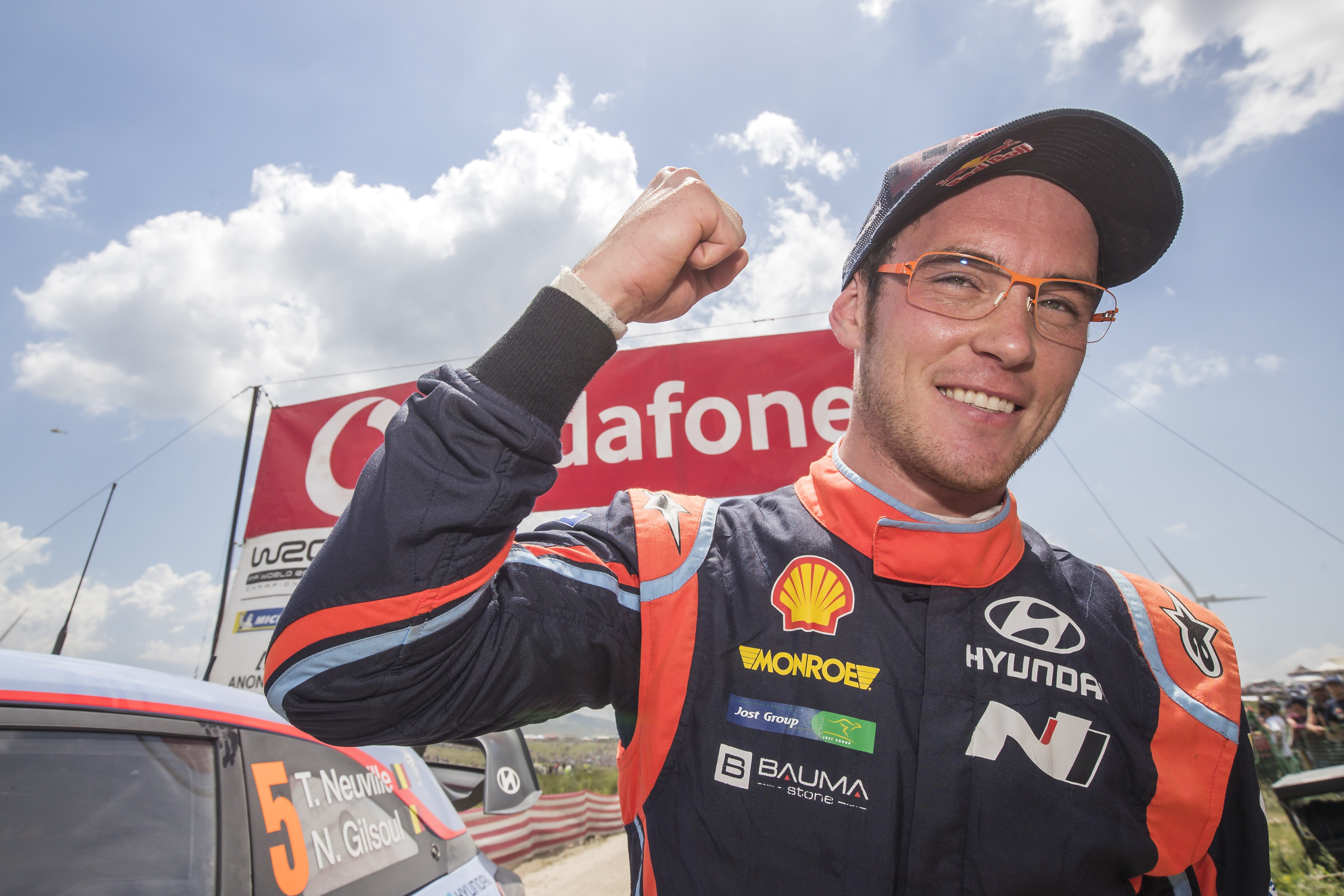
Thierry Neuville won his first drivers' championship title.

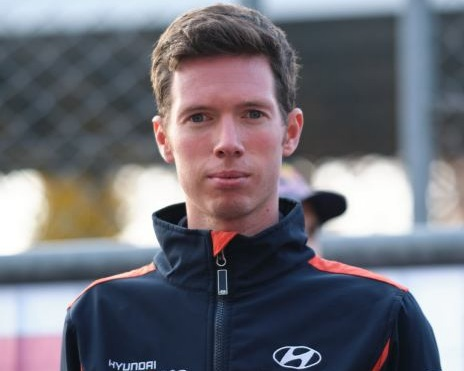
Martijn Wydaeghe won his first co-drivers' championship title.

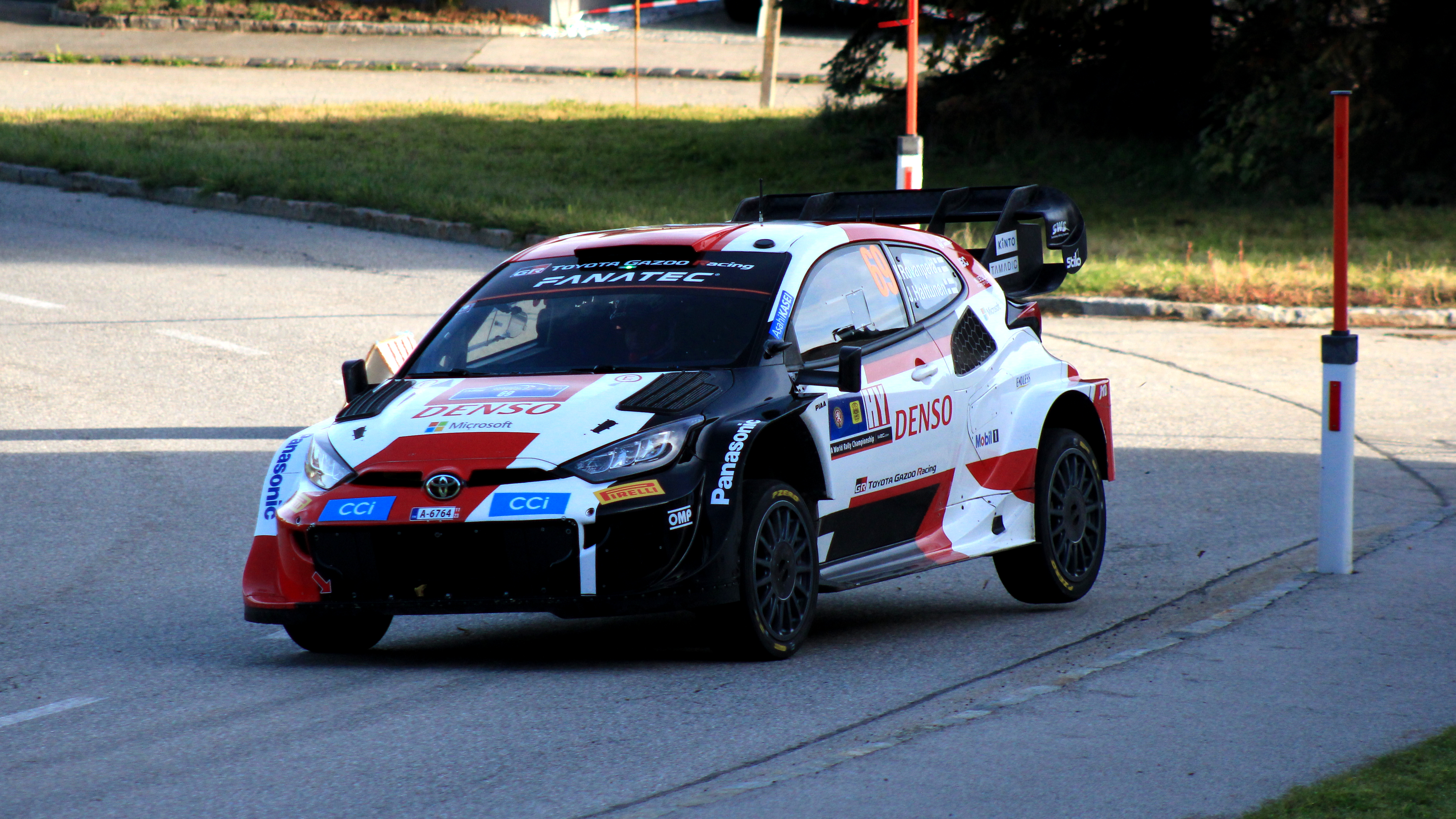
Toyota Gazoo Racing WRT (GR Yaris Rally1 pictured) were the manufacturers' champions.

The 2024 FIA World Rally Championship was the 52nd season of the World Rally Championship, an international rallying series organised by the Fédération Internationale de l'Automobile (FIA) and WRC Promoter GmbH. Teams and crews competed for the World Rally Championships for Drivers, Co-drivers and Manufacturers. Crews were free to compete in cars complying with Groups Rally1 to Rally5 regulations; however, only manufacturers competing with Rally1 cars were eligible to score points in the manufacturers' championship. The championship began in January 2024 with the Monte Carlo Rally and concluded in November 2024 with the Rally Japan. The series was supported by the WRC2 and WRC3 categories at every round of the championship, and by Junior WRC at selected events.

Kalle Rovanperä and Jonne Halttunen were the reigning drivers' and co-drivers' champions, having secured their second championship titles at the 2023 Central European Rally. However, they only contested at selected events. Toyota were the defending manufacturers' champions.

At the conclusion of the championship, Thierry Neuville and Martijn Wydaeghe won their first World Rally Championship titles at the 2024 Rally Japan. Elfyn Evans and Scott Martin were second, trailing by 32 points. Ott Tänak and Martin Järveoja were third, a further ten points behind. In the manufacturers' championship, Toyota Gazoo Racing WRT successfully defended their title, holding only a three-point advantage over Hyundai Shell Mobis WRT, with M-Sport Ford WRT in third.

== Calendar ==
A map showing the locations of the rallies in the 2024 championship. Event headquarters are marked with black dots.

The 2024 season was contested over thirteen rounds across Europe, Africa, South America and Asia.

Round	Start date	Finish date	Rally	Rally headquarters	Surface	Stages	Distance	Ref.
1	25 January	28 January	(Monaco) Rallye Automobile Monte Carlo	Gap, Provence-Alpes-Côte d'Azur, France	Mixed (Note: The Monte Carlo Rally is run on a tarmac and snow surface.)	17	324.44 km	
2	15 February	18 February	Rally Sweden	Umeå, Västerbotten County, Sweden	Snow	18	300.10 km	
3	28 March	31 March	Safari Rally Kenya	Nairobi, Nakuru County, Kenya	Gravel	19	355.92 km	
4	18 April	21 April	Croatia Rally	Zagreb, Croatia	Tarmac	20	283.28 km	
5	9 May	12 May	Rally de Portugal	Matosinhos, Porto, Portugal	Gravel	22	337.04 km	
6	30 May	2 June	(Italy) Rally Italia Sardegna	Alghero, Sardinia, Italy	Gravel	16	266.12 km	
7	27 June	30 June	Rally Poland	Mikołajki, Warmian–Masurian, Poland	Gravel	19	304.10 km	
8	18 July	21 July	Rally Latvia	Liepāja, Kurzeme Planning Region, Latvia	Gravel	20	300.13 km	
9	1 August	4 August	Rally Finland	Jyväskylä, Central Finland, Finland	Gravel	20	305.69 km	
10	5 September	8 September	Acropolis Rally Greece	Lamia, Central Greece, Greece	Gravel	15	305.30 km	
11	26 September	29 September	Rally Chile	Concepción, Biobío, Chile	Gravel	16	306.76 km	
12	17 October	20 October	(Europe) Central European Rally	Bad Griesbach, Bavaria, Germany	Tarmac	18	302.51 km	
13	21 November	24 November	Rally Japan	Toyota, Aichi, Japan	Tarmac	21	302.59 km	

=== Calendar changes ===
The championship was expected to be expanded to 14 rounds, however WRC Promoter GmbH retained the existing total of 13 events with the reasoning that it would aid participation of more Rally1 cars.

- Rally Liepāja stepped up from the European Rally Championship to hold a World Rally Championship event under a new name, Rally Latvia. The rally was held on gravel roads that ranged from the cities of Rīga and Liepāja to the regions of Talsi, Tukums, Kuldīga and Dienvidkurzeme.
- Rally Poland returned to the championship. This marked the first time the event was held as a WRC event since 2017.
- Rally Estonia was replaced by Rally Latvia on the calendar in 2024, but the event returned in 2025.
- Rally Mexico dropped off the calendar.

The WRC Promoter GmbH was also working on the two key calendar expansions for the future.

- Progress had been made for the candidate event in the United States, a location that was also aiming to join the championship in 2024.
- The other key expansion was Rally China, which was last featured in 1999. The rally was also scheduled to be held in 2016, but it was ultimately cancelled due to the damage caused by the 2016 China floods.

In addition, the candidate list also included the event in Saudi Arabia, where it aimed at a 2025 calendar slot. The rally was a part of WRC Promoter GmbH's plan to deliver a desert event. Rally Argentina was also bidding to return to the championship.

=== Other changes ===
- The organizers of the Monte Carlo Rally relocated its headquarters back to Gap in France. The rally was previously based in Monaco.
- The Kenyan Rally, which took place in June in the previous three seasons, moved ahead to March at the weekend of Easter as the third round of the season.
- The running date of the Central European Rally was moved two weeks earlier with a headquarter change to avoid the clash with All Saints' Day.

== Entrants ==
The following manufacturers contested the championship under Rally1 regulations. All crews use tyres provided by Pirelli.

Rally1 entries eligible to score manufacturer points
Manufacturer	Entrant	Car	No.	Driver name	Co-driver name	Rounds
Ford	(United Kingdom) M-Sport Ford WRT	Ford Puma Rally1	13	(Luxembourg) Grégoire Munster	(Belgium) Louis Louka	All
Ford	(United Kingdom) M-Sport Ford WRT	Ford Puma Rally1	16	(France) Adrien Fourmaux	(France) Alexandre Coria	All
Hyundai	(South Korea) Hyundai Shell Mobis WRT	Hyundai i20 N Rally1	4	(Finland) Esapekka Lappi	(Finland) Janne Ferm	2–3, 8–9, 11
Hyundai	(South Korea) Hyundai Shell Mobis WRT	Hyundai i20 N Rally1	6	(Spain) Dani Sordo	(Spain) Cándido Carrera	5–6, 10
Hyundai	(South Korea) Hyundai Shell Mobis WRT	Hyundai i20 N Rally1	8	(Estonia) Ott Tänak	(Estonia) Martin Järveoja	All
Hyundai	(South Korea) Hyundai Shell Mobis WRT	Hyundai i20 N Rally1	9	(Norway) Andreas Mikkelsen	(Norway) Torstein Eriksen	1, 4, 7, 12–13
Hyundai	(South Korea) Hyundai Shell Mobis WRT	Hyundai i20 N Rally1	11	(Belgium) Thierry Neuville	(Belgium) Martijn Wydaeghe	All
Toyota	(Japan) Toyota Gazoo Racing WRT	Toyota GR Yaris Rally1	17	(France) Sébastien Ogier	(France) Vincent Landais	1, 4–13 (Note: The crew of Sébastien Ogier and Vincent Landais was registered for the 2024 Rally Poland, but they were withdrawn by the team after being involved in a road accident during recce.)
Toyota	(Japan) Toyota Gazoo Racing WRT	Toyota GR Yaris Rally1	18	(Japan) Takamoto Katsuta	(Republic of Ireland) Aaron Johnston	1–4, 6–7, 10, 12–13
Toyota	(Japan) Toyota Gazoo Racing WRT	Toyota GR Yaris Rally1	33	(United Kingdom) Elfyn Evans	(United Kingdom) Scott Martin	All
Toyota	(Japan) Toyota Gazoo Racing WRT	Toyota GR Yaris Rally1	69	(Finland) Kalle Rovanperä	(Finland) Jonne Halttunen	2–3, 5, 7–9, 11

The following crews entered in Rally1 cars as privateers or under arrangement with the manufacturers.

Rally1 entries ineligible to score manufacturer points
Manufacturer	Entrant	Car	No.	Driver name	Co-driver name	Rounds
Ford	(United Kingdom) M-Sport Ford WRT	Ford Puma Rally1	19	(Greece) Jourdan Serderidis	(Belgium) Frédéric Miclotte	3, 10, 12
Ford	(United Kingdom) M-Sport Ford WRT	Ford Puma Rally1	22	(Latvia) Mārtiņš Sesks	(Latvia) Renārs Francis	7–8, 11
Toyota	(Japan) Toyota Gazoo Racing WRT	Toyota GR Yaris Rally1	5	(Finland) Sami Pajari	(Finland) Enni Mälkönen	9, 11–12 (Note: The crew of Takamoto Katsuta and Aaron Johnston was registered for the 2024 Rally Chile, but they were replaced by Sami Pajari and Enni Mälkönen as a consequence of the lack of form.)
Toyota	(Japan) Toyota Gazoo Racing WRT	Toyota GR Yaris Rally1	18	(Japan) Takamoto Katsuta	(Republic of Ireland) Aaron Johnston	5, 8–9, ~~11~~
Toyota	(Japan) Toyota Gazoo Racing WRT	Toyota GR Yaris Rally1	37	(Italy) Lorenzo Bertelli	(Italy) Simone Scattolin	2

=== In detail ===
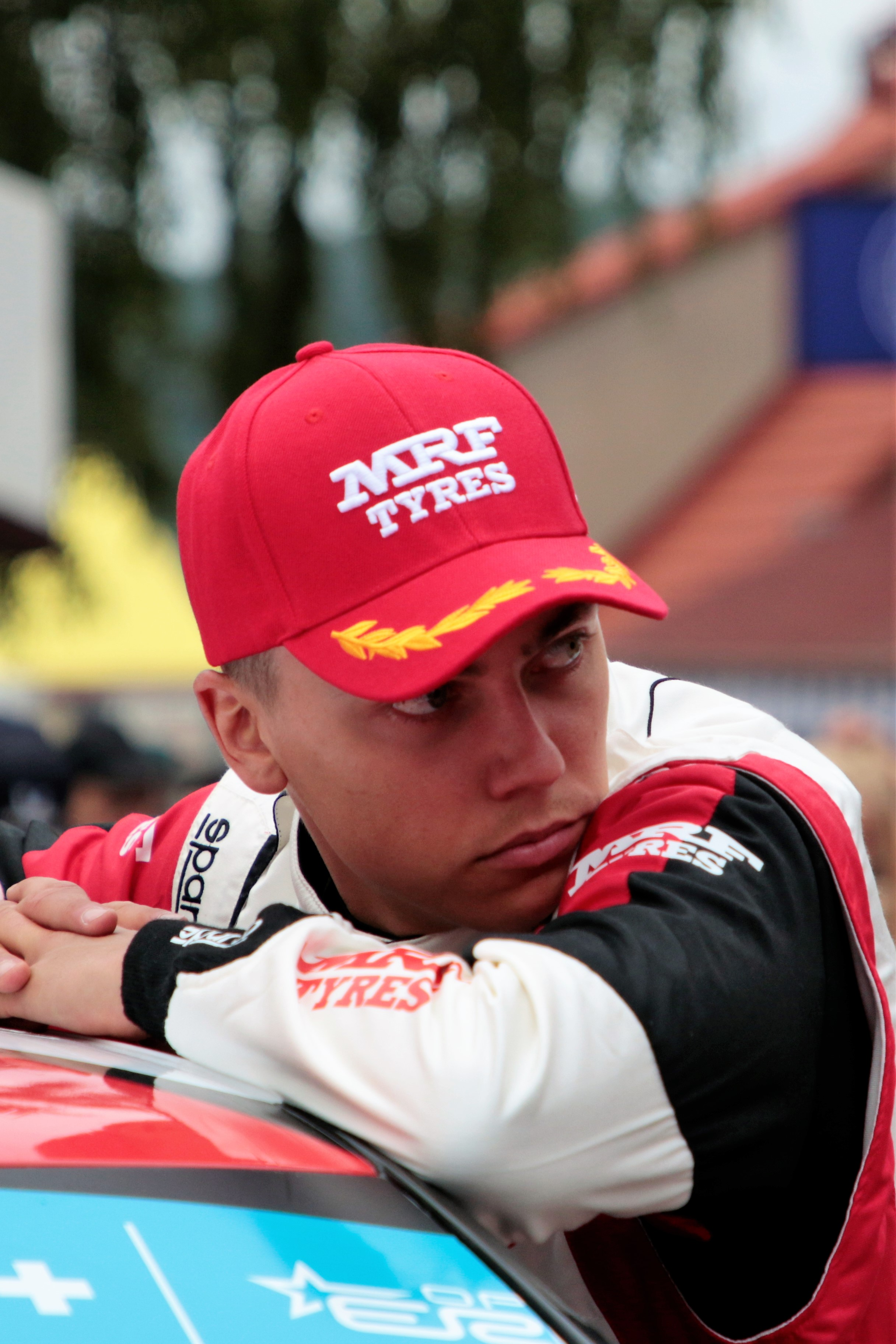
Mārtiņš Sesks made his first top tier run at the 2024 Rally Poland.

M-Sport featured a new line-up, with the crews led by Adrien Fourmaux and Grégoire Munster becoming the two full-time competitors. Pierre-Louis Loubet, who drove for the team over the previous two seasons, was announced to compete in the WRC2 category with Toksport. Latvian driver Mārtiņš Sesks made his top tier debut with the team as a part of the collaboration program with WRC Promoter GmbH.

Hyundai retained the crew of Thierry Neuville and Martijn Wydaeghe. Ott Tänak and Martin Järveoja rejoined the team after spending one year with M-Sport. Esapekka Lappi was also remained with the team, but his program was reduced. His co-driver Janne Ferm announced to end his WRC career after completing the 2024 Rally Chile. Andreas Mikkelsen returned to Hyundai for his second stint the team, sharing a third car with the crew led by Dani Sordo and Lappi.

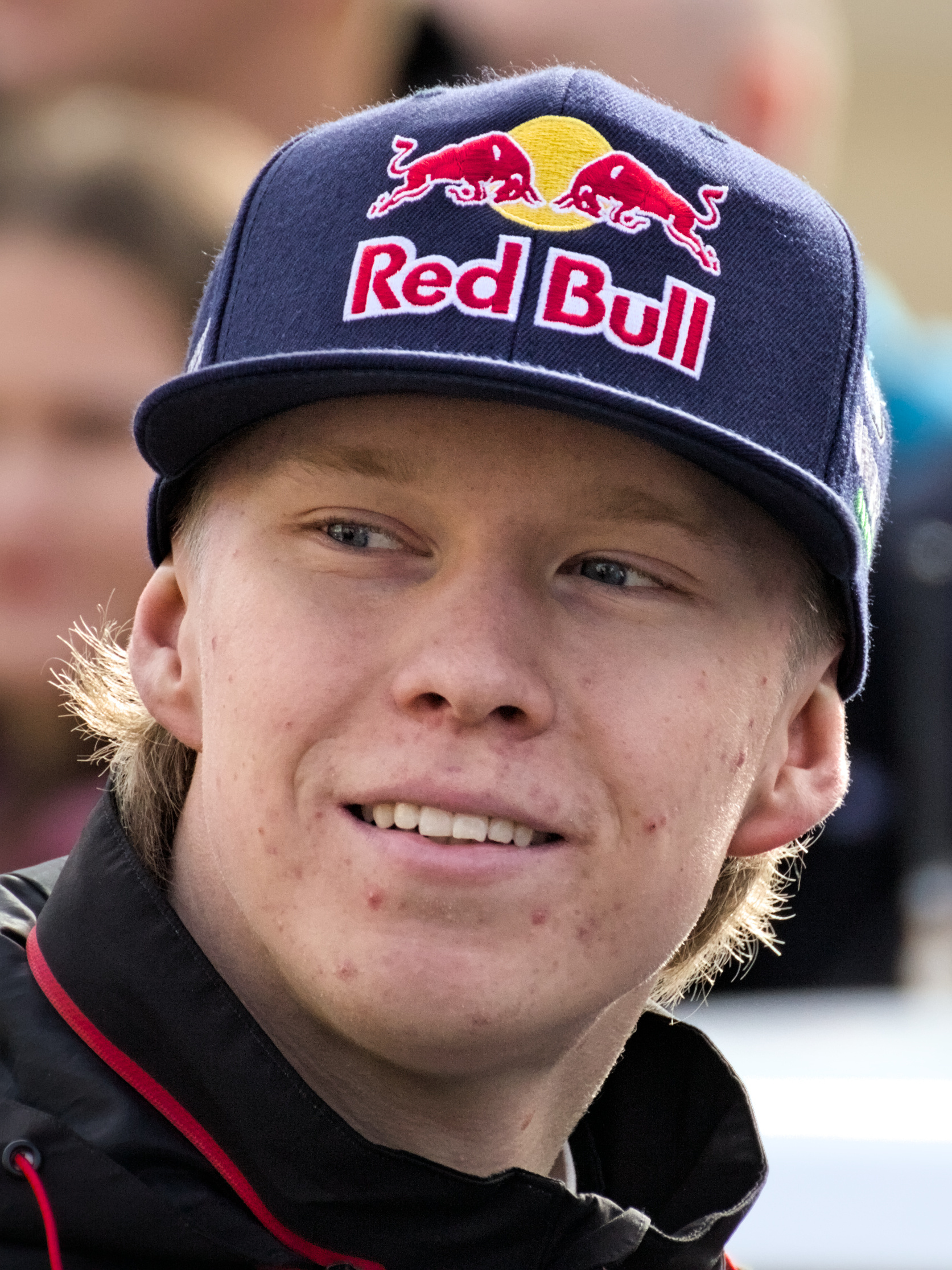
Double defending champion Kalle Rovanperä contested at selected events.

Toyota kept the lineup from 2023, with the crews led by Elfyn Evans and by Takamoto Katsuta becoming the two full-time competitors for the team. Reigning world champion Kalle Rovanperä signed a multi-year contract with the team, but he only contested a partial program this season. Eight-time world champion Sébastien Ogier continued his approach to the championship, competing at selected events. They did not share a third car. Sami Pajari and Enni Mälkönen made their top class debut at the 2024 Rally Finland.

== Regulation changes ==
The points system had a major revision to prevent saving tyres for the Power Stage. The top ten competitors in the overall classification by the end of Saturday were subject to score 18–15–13–10–8–6–4–3–2–1 points respectively as long as they completed a classified rally finish, otherwise these points would be pass to the next eligible competitor. The top seven runners of Sunday's stages would receive 7–6–5–4–3–2–1 points respectively. Points for Power Stage remained unchanged.

A shorter itinerary of 48 hours was featured at the Rally Italia Sardegna, which was a trial run of the compact weekend format that was proposed by the FIA.

== Season report ==
=== Opening rounds ===
Neuville and Wydaeghe won the season opener, where they received thirty points, the maximum under the new points system, after leading by the end of Saturday, recording the shortest time on Sunday and winning the Power Stage. As championship leaders, Neuville and Wydaeghe were supposed to be first on road at the first leg of the next round, but their i20 was unable to start because of a fuel pressure issue before the first stage of the afternoon. This led to title rivals Evans and Martin being first on the road, who lost time due to the conditions. Nevertheless, Evans and Martin still outscored Neuville and Wydaeghe at the conclusion of the event, closing the gap to only three points in the championships. Lappi and Ferm took the victory, ending their winning drought stretching six-and-a-half years, with Fourmaux and Coria achieved their first podium finish.

After Hyundai had won the first two races, Toyota responded with a 1–2 finish at Rally Safari, extending their manufacturers' championship lead to four points. Neuville and Wydaeghe had a troublesome weekend, but a successful run on Sunday saw the Belgian crew rebuild their driver's championship lead back to six points. Toyota's Ogier and Landais won in Croatia, after snatching the rally lead when the crews ahead (Neuville and Wydaeghe, Evans and Martin) made mistakes.

=== Mid-season gravel events ===
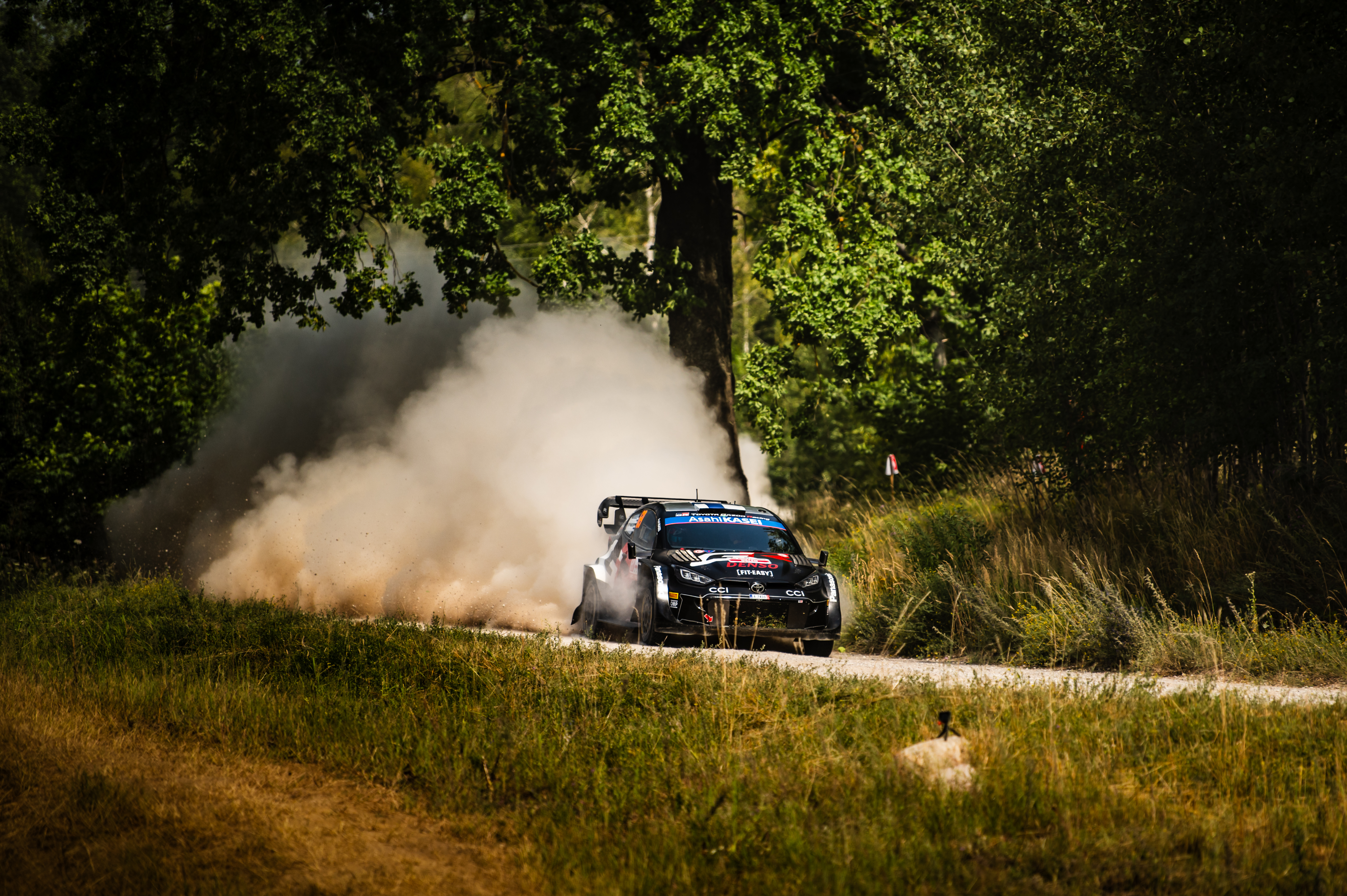
Kalle Rovanperä and Jonne Halttunen won the 2024 Rally Poland after replacing the injured Sébastien Ogier and Vincent Landais.

The first gravel rally of the season was Portugal, where Ogier and Landais won, and it was Ogier's sixth Portugal win. They were on course for a hat-trick of victories at Sardegna, but a puncture at the Power Stage meant Tänak and Järveoja overtook them to win. The winning margin was only 0.2 seconds, the joint closest win (with the 2011 Jordan Rally) in WRC. Ogier and Landais withdrew from the Polish Rally before it began, due to a road accident during recce. Rovanperä and Halttunen were their replacements for Toyota, who won the rally despite limited preparation. They also won the following round in Latvia, leading the rally from start to finish and taking their 200th stage victory. Having debuted in Poland, the Latvian pair, Sesks and Francis, won their first stage early in their home rally. They were on course for a maiden podium finish, but a differential issue on the final day caused them to drop out of contention.

In Finland, Rovanperä and Halttunen were leading their home event, but rolled their car on the event's penultimate stage. Tänak and Järveoja withdrew after experiencing a violent crash at the rally, which hospitalized Järveoja. Evans and Martin suffered a transmission issue which caused them to drop out of the top ten, before they crashed out during the penultimate stage. With their main rivals not scoring, championship leaders Neuville and Wydaeghe extended their championship lead to 27 points, with the rally winners Ogier and Vincent rising to second place. The event also saw Pajari and Mälkönen make their WRC debut, where they won a stage on their ninth attempt.

With great speed from second on the road, we took 45 seconds to the championship leader, so maybe he [Neuville] should learn to open the road because he's not really fast from first on the road, he just cries all the time.

— Ogier's comments at the end of the first day

At the Acropolis Rally, the Toyotas of Ogier & Landais and Evans & Martin both suffered turbocharger issues. Toyota's third crew of Katsuta and Johnston crashed out whist competing for the rally lead, leaving Hyundai occupying the top three places at the end of first day. Ogier had been 45 seconds ahead of championship leader Neuville, but ended almost two minutes behind; Ogier publicly stated that Neuville should "stop crying" and "learn to drive first on the road". Neuville and Wydaeghe won the rally, with Hyundai occupying all three places on the podium, as they had done two years ago at the same event. Ogier and Landais had recovered to second place before rolling their Yaris during the Power Stage. Hyundai's dominance meant they built a 35-point lead in the constructor's championship. Toyota struck back at the following round in Chile, taking the top three places themselves for a maximum point haul which halved the championship lead. The winners in Chile were Rovanperä and Halttunen.

=== Closing rounds ===
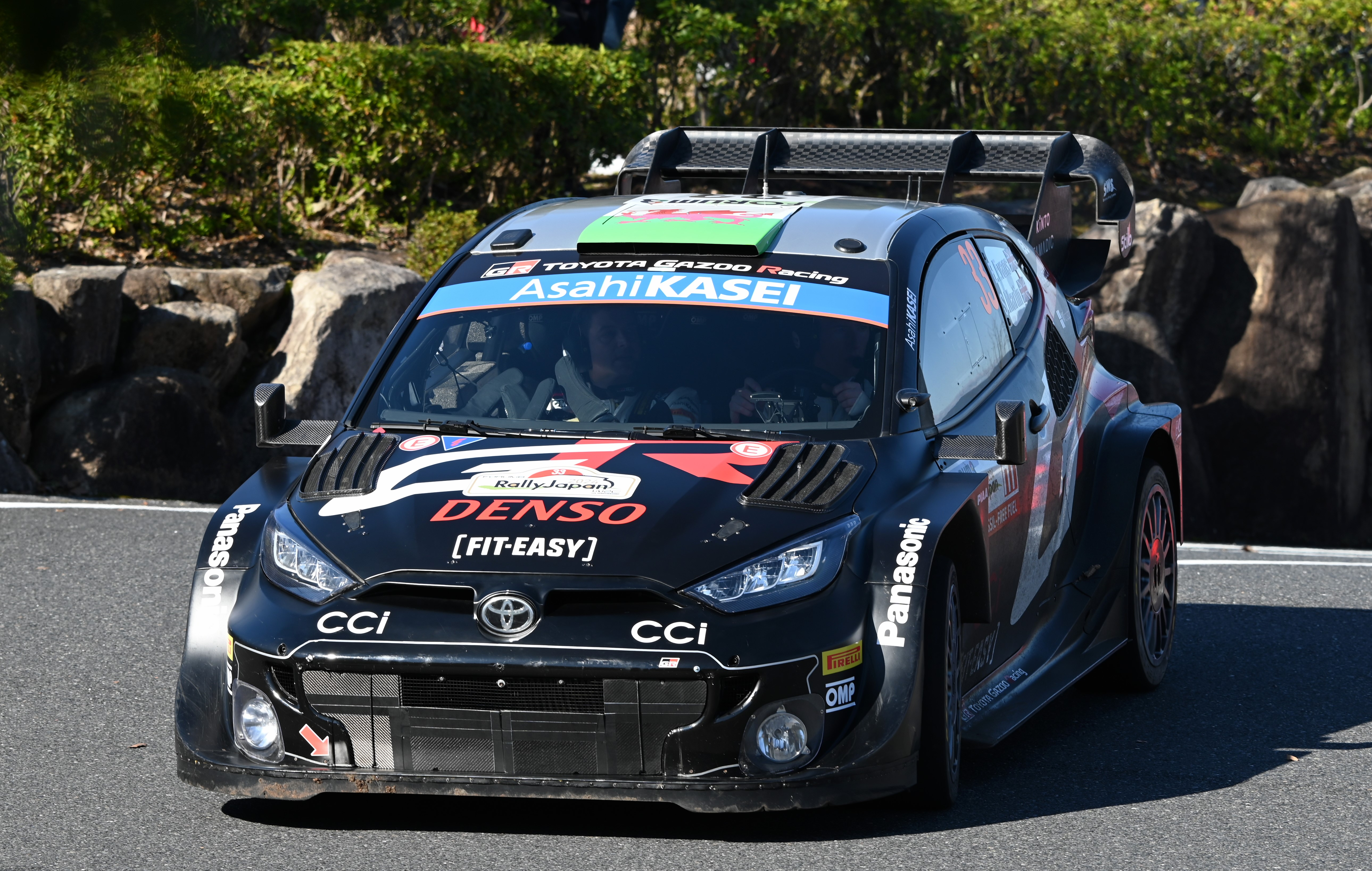
Elfyn Evans and Scott Martin's victory at the 2024 Rally Japan helped Toyota to snatch their fourth consecutive manufacturer's title.

Tänak and Järveoja won the penultimate round in Germany; Ogier and Landais had been leading but crashed out on the penultimate stage. The victory reduced the gap for the driver's championship to 25 points, ensuring the title would be decided at the final event. At the final rally in Japan, Tänak and Järveoja crashed out on the final day while leading the rally, handing Neuville and Wydaeghe the championship. An engine issue had left Neuville and Wydaeghe outside the top ten. The retirement of Tänak and Järveoja left the manufacturers' title undecided, with Hyundai and Toyota level on 553 points based on the provisional standings before the Power Stage. Toyota outperformed Hyundai at the stage, plus a 1–2 event-finish led by Evans and Martin, meaning Toyota won the manufacturers' championship for the fourth straight year. The winning margin was only three points, the tightest since 1983 (when Lancia won by two points).

== Results and standings ==
=== Season summary ===
Round	Event	Winning driver	Winning co-driver	Winning entrant	Winning time	Report	Ref.
1	(Monaco) Rallye Automobile Monte Carlo	(Belgium) Thierry Neuville	(Belgium) Martijn Wydaeghe	(South Korea) Hyundai Shell Mobis WRT	3:09:30.9	Report	
2	Rally Sweden	(Finland) Esapekka Lappi	(Finland) Janne Ferm	(South Korea) Hyundai Shell Mobis WRT	2:33:04.9	Report	
3	Safari Rally Kenya	(Finland) Kalle Rovanperä	(Finland) Jonne Halttunen	(Japan) Toyota Gazoo Racing WRT	3:36:04.0	Report	
4	Croatia Rally	(France) Sébastien Ogier	(France) Vincent Landais	(Japan) Toyota Gazoo Racing WRT	2:40:23.6	Report	
5	Rally de Portugal	(France) Sébastien Ogier	(France) Vincent Landais	(Japan) Toyota Gazoo Racing WRT	3:41:32.3	Report	
6	(Italy) Rally Italia Sardegna	(Estonia) Ott Tänak	(Estonia) Martin Järveoja	(South Korea) Hyundai Shell Mobis WRT	3:06:05.6	Report	
7	Rally Poland	(Finland) Kalle Rovanperä	(Finland) Jonne Halttunen	(Japan) Toyota Gazoo Racing WRT	2:33:07.6	Report	
8	Rally Latvia	(Finland) Kalle Rovanperä	(Finland) Jonne Halttunen	(Japan) Toyota Gazoo Racing WRT	2:31:47.6	Report	
9	Rally Finland	(France) Sébastien Ogier	(France) Vincent Landais	(Japan) Toyota Gazoo Racing WRT	2:25:41.9	Report	
10	Acropolis Rally Greece	(Belgium) Thierry Neuville	(Belgium) Martijn Wydaeghe	(South Korea) Hyundai Shell Mobis WRT	3:38:04.2	Report	
11	Rally Chile	(Finland) Kalle Rovanperä	(Finland) Jonne Halttunen	(Japan) Toyota Gazoo Racing WRT	2:58:59.8	Report	
12	(Europe) Central European Rally	(Estonia) Ott Tänak	(Estonia) Martin Järveoja	(South Korea) Hyundai Shell Mobis WRT	2:37:34.6	Report	
13	Rally Japan	(United Kingdom) Elfyn Evans	(United Kingdom) Scott Martin	(Japan) Toyota Gazoo Racing WRT	3:23:41.0	Report	

=== Scoring system ===
Points were awarded to the top ten crews in the overall classification by the end of Saturday, and top seven crews in an accumulated overall classification of all Sunday stages in each event. In the manufacturers' championship, teams were eligible to nominate three crews to score points, but these points were only awarded to the top two classified finishers representing a manufacturer and driving a 2024-specification Rally1 car. There were also five bonus points awarded to the winners of the Power Stage, four points for second place, three for third, two for fourth and one for fifth. Power Stage points were awarded in the drivers', co-drivers' and manufacturers' championships.

Position	1st	2nd	3rd	4th	5th	6th	7th	8th	9th	10th
Saturday	18	15	13	10	8	6	4	3	2	1
Sunday	7	6	5	4	3	2	1	—N/a		
Power Stage	5	4	3	2	1	—N/a				

=== FIA World Rally Championship for Drivers ===
The driver who recorded a points-scoring classification would be taken into account for the championship regardless of the categories.

Pos.	Driver	MON (Monaco)	SWE (Sweden)	KEN (Kenya)	CRO (Croatia)	POR (Portugal)	ITA (Italy)	POL (Poland)	LAT (Latvia)	FIN (Finland)	GRE (Greece)	CHL (Chile)	EUR (Europe)	JPN (Japan)	Points
1	(Belgium) Thierry Neuville														242
2	(United Kingdom) Elfyn Evans														210
3	(Estonia) Ott Tänak														200
4	(France) Sébastien Ogier														191
5	(France) Adrien Fourmaux														162
6	(Japan) Takamoto Katsuta														116
7	(Finland) Kalle Rovanperä														114
8	(Luxembourg) Grégoire Munster														46
9	(Spain) Dani Sordo														44
10	(Finland) Sami Pajari														44
11	(Norway) Andreas Mikkelsen														40
12	(Finland) Esapekka Lappi														33
13	(Sweden) Oliver Solberg														27
14	(Bulgaria) Nikolay Gryazin														24
15	(Latvia) Mārtiņš Sesks														22
16	(France) Yohan Rossel														14
17	(Poland) Kajetan Kajetanowicz														9
18	(United Kingdom) Gus Greensmith														8
19	(Estonia) Robert Virves														7
20	(Estonia) Georg Linnamäe														7
21	(Finland) Jari-Matti Latvala														6
22	(Spain) Jan Solans														6
23	(Finland) Lauri Joona														5
24	(Finland) Mikko Heikkilä														4
25	(Finland) Roope Korhonen														3
26	(Czech Republic) Filip Mareš														3
27	(Republic of Ireland) Josh McErlean														2
28	(Spain) Pepe López														2
29	(Greece) Jourdan Serderidis														2
30	(Poland) Mikołaj Marczyk														2
31	(Japan) Hiroki Arai														2
32	(Paraguay) Fabrizio Zaldivar														1
33	(Czech Republic) Martin Prokop														1
Pos.	Driver	MON (Monaco)	SWE (Sweden)	KEN (Kenya)	CRO (Croatia)	POR (Portugal)	ITA (Italy)	POL (Poland)	LAT (Latvia)	FIN (Finland)	GRE (Greece)	CHL (Chile)	EUR (Europe)	JPN (Japan)	Points

Key
Colour	Result
Gold	Winner
Silver	2nd place
Bronze	3rd place
Green	Top 10 finish
Blue	Non-top 10 finish
Blue	Non-classified finish (NC)
Purple	Did not finish (Ret)
Black	Excluded (EX)
Black	Disqualified (DSQ)
White	Did not start (DNS)
White	Cancelled (C)
Blank	Withdrew entry from the event (WD)

Notes:
Main script – Final position
Text below – Points scored from Saturday, Sunday and the Power Stage

=== FIA World Rally Championship for Co-Drivers ===
The co-driver who recorded a points-scoring classification would be taken into account for the championship regardless of the categories.

Pos.	Co-driver	MON (Monaco)	SWE (Sweden)	KEN (Kenya)	CRO (Croatia)	POR (Portugal)	ITA (Italy)	POL (Poland)	LAT (Latvia)	FIN (Finland)	GRE (Greece)	CHL (Chile)	EUR (Europe)	JPN (Japan)	Points
1	(Belgium) Martijn Wydaeghe														242
2	(United Kingdom) Scott Martin														210
3	(Estonia) Martin Järveoja														200
4	(France) Vincent Landais														191
5	(France) Alexandre Coria														162
6	(Republic of Ireland) Aaron Johnston														116
7	(Finland) Jonne Halttunen														114
8	(Belgium) Louis Louka														46
9	(Spain) Cándido Carrera														42
10	(Finland) Enni Mälkönen														44
11	(Finland) Janne Ferm														33
12	(Norway) Torstein Eriksen														40
13	(Sweden) Elliott Edmondson														27
14	Konstantin Aleksandrov (Note: Konstantin Aleksandrov is a Russian national, but competes as an Authorised Neutral Athlete in accordance with recommendations made by the International Olympic Committee, after a decision by the FIA to ban all connections with Russia following the Russian invasion of Ukraine.)														24
15	(Latvia) Renārs Francis														22
16	(Poland) Maciej Szczepaniak														9
17	(Sweden) Jonas Andersson														8
18	(Estonia) Aleks Lesk														7
19	(France) Florian Barral														7
20	(United Kingdom) James Morgan														7
21	(Finland) Juho Hänninen														6
22	(Spain) Rodrigo Sanjuan														6
23	(Finland) Janni Hussi														5
24	(France) Benjamin Boulloud														4
25	(Finland) Kristian Temonen														4
26	(France) Arnaud Dunand														3
27	(Czech Republic) Filip Mareš														3
28	(Finland) Anssi Viinikka														3
29	(Republic of Ireland) James Fulton														2
30	(Spain) David Vázquez Liste														2
31	(Belgium) Frédéric Miclotte														2
32	(Poland) Szymon Gospodarczyk														2
33	(Japan) Shunsuke Matsuo														2
34	(Italy) Marcelo Der Ohannesian														1
35	(Czech Republic) Michal Ernst														1
Pos.	Co-driver	MON (Monaco)	SWE (Sweden)	KEN (Kenya)	CRO (Croatia)	POR (Portugal)	ITA (Italy)	POL (Poland)	LAT (Latvia)	FIN (Finland)	GRE (Greece)	CHL (Chile)	EUR (Europe)	JPN (Japan)	Points

Key
Colour	Result
Gold	Winner
Silver	2nd place
Bronze	3rd place
Green	Top 10 finish
Blue	Non-top 10 finish
Blue	Non-classified finish (NC)
Purple	Did not finish (Ret)
Black	Excluded (EX)
Black	Disqualified (DSQ)
White	Did not start (DNS)
White	Cancelled (C)
Blank	Withdrew entry from the event (WD)

Notes:
Main script – Final position
Text below – Points scored from Saturday, Sunday and the Power Stage

=== FIA World Rally Championship for Manufacturers ===
Only the best two results of each manufacturer in the respective overall classification by the end of Saturday, accumulated position of all Sunday stages and Power Stage at each rally were taken into account for the championship.

Pos.	Manufacturer	MON (Monaco)	SWE (Sweden)	KEN (Kenya)	CRO (Croatia)	POR (Portugal)	ITA (Italy)	POL (Poland)	LAT (Latvia)	FIN (Finland)	GRE (Greece)	CHL (Chile)	EUR (Europe)	JPN (Japan)	Points
1	(Japan) Toyota Gazoo Racing WRT														561
2	(South Korea) Hyundai Shell Mobis WRT														558
3	(United Kingdom) M-Sport Ford WRT														295
Pos.	Manufacturer	MON (Monaco)	SWE (Sweden)	KEN (Kenya)	CRO (Croatia)	POR (Portugal)	ITA (Italy)	POL (Poland)	LAT (Latvia)	FIN (Finland)	GRE (Greece)	CHL (Chile)	EUR (Europe)	JPN (Japan)	Points

Key
Colour	Result
Gold	Winner
Silver	2nd place
Bronze	3rd place
Green	Top 10 finish
Blue	Non-top 10 finish
Blue	Non-classified finish (NC)
Purple	Did not finish (Ret)
Black	Excluded (EX)
Black	Disqualified (DSQ)
White	Did not start (DNS)
White	Cancelled (C)
Blank	Withdrew entry from the event (WD)

Notes:
Main script – Final position
Text below – Points scored from Saturday, Sunday and the Power Stage
