= Vincent Landais =

French rally co-driver (born 1991)

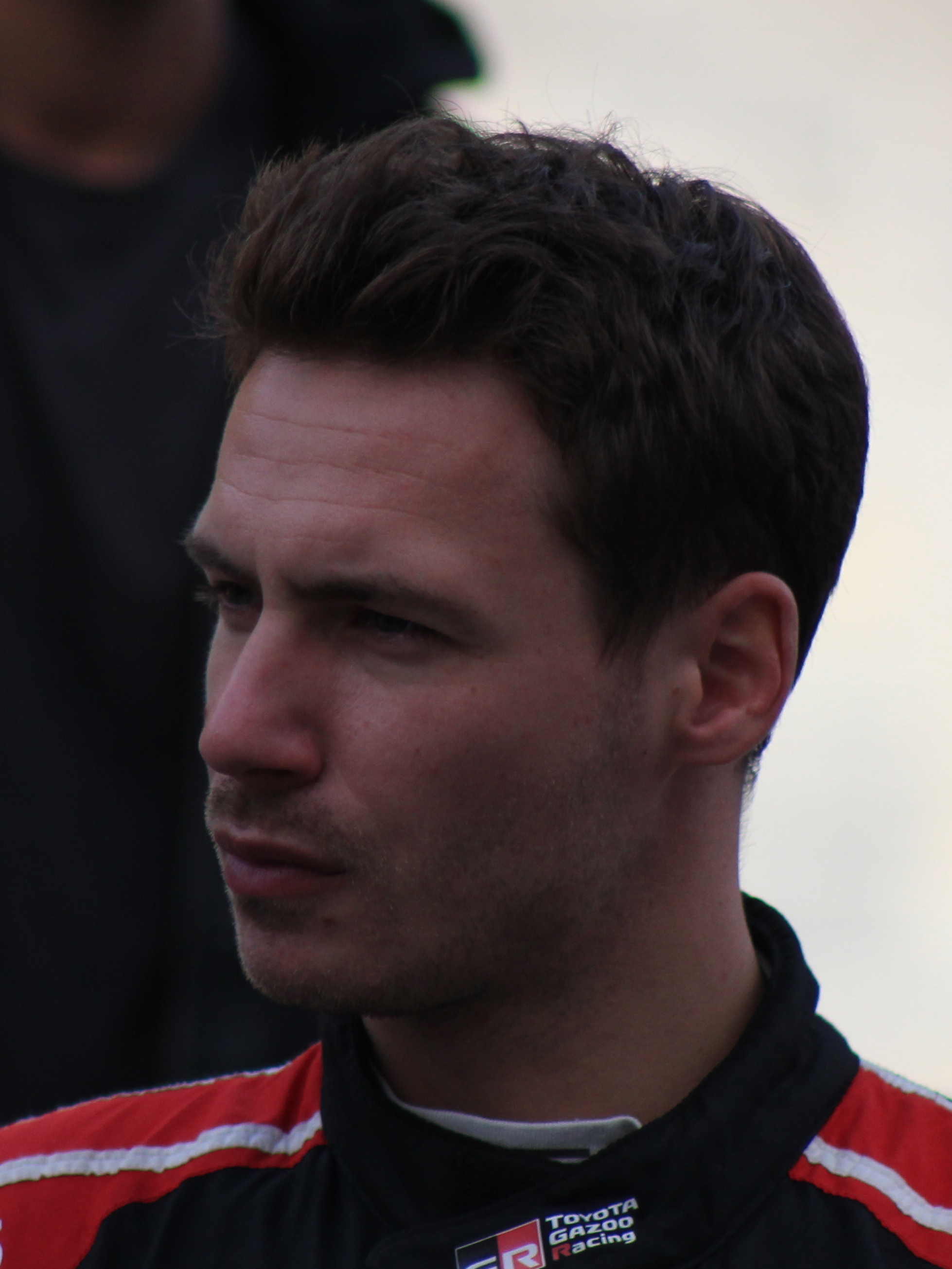
- Landais at the 2023 Central European Rally

Personal information
- Nationality: (France) French
- Born: 17 October 1991 (age 35); Jarville-la-Malgrange, France

World Rally Championship record
- Years active: 2012–present
- Driver: (France) Laurent Gracial (France) Robert Consani (Switzerland) Jonathan Hirschi (France) Pierre-Louis Loubet (France) Quentin Giordano (France) Sébastien Ogier
- Teams: Hyundai 2C Competition, M-Sport Ford WRT, Toyota Gazoo Racing WRT
- Rallies: 94 (93 starts)
- Championships: 1 (2025)
- Rally wins: 14
- Podiums: 27
- Stage wins: 103
- Total points: 857
- First rally: 2012 Rallye de France
- First win: 2023 Monte Carlo Rally
- Last win: 2026 Acropolis Rally
- Last rally: 2026 Rally Italia Sardegna

Vincent Landais (born 17 October 1991) is a French rally co-driver. He is the co-driver of the French rally driver Sébastien Ogier, racing for Toyota Gazoo Racing WRT.

== Rally career ==
=== Early career ===
Landais began his competitive career in rallying at the age of 21, debuting as co-driver to Laurent Gracial at the 2012 Rallye de France-Alsace. He joined the FIA European Rally Championship in 2014, partnering with Robert Consani in a Peugeot 207 S2000 for the first four rounds of the season. In 2015, Landais teamed up with Jonathan Hirschi, and the pair stepped up to the WRC2 category, achieving a best finish of fifth in class at the Monte Carlo Rally.

=== Partnership with Pierre-Louis Loubet ===
The partnership with Hirschi concluded at the end of the 2015 season. For 2016, Landais began a successful collaboration with fellow French driver Pierre-Louis Loubet. The duo's most significant achievement came in 2019 when they secured the WRC2 Championship title driving a Škoda Fabia R5. This success led to their entry into the top-tier World Rally Championship class in 2020 with 2C Competition. Their WRC debut occurred at the Rally Estonia, although they retired due to a steering rack failure. They went on to score their first WRC points later that season in Sardinia.

Loubet and Landais were initially handed a full-season entry with Hyundai 2C Competition for 2021, but they parted ways after the first three rounds, with Florian Haut-Labourdette taking over as Loubet's co-driver.

Landais and Loubet reunited to compete in the Ford Puma Rally1 during 2022. The pair scored a season best of fourth place in Italy and Greece.

=== Toyota and championship victory ===
When Benjamin Veillas stepped down as co-driver for eight-time World Champion Sébastien Ogier ahead of the final round of the 2022 season, Landais was selected to join the Toyota Gazoo Racing WRT team alongside Ogier. Their partnership quickly yielded results, Landais secured his first career WRC victory at the opening round of the 2023 season, the Monte Carlo Rally. The pair followed this up with wins at Rally Mexico and the Safari Rally, where they led a dominant 1-2-3-4 finish for the Toyota team.

Heading into 2024, Ogier and Landais committed to a partial programme, competing in all but two rounds. They achieved three more victories that season in Croatia, Portugal, and Finland. Their campaign was marked by an incident at Rally Poland where they were forced to withdraw following a car accident on a recce run prior to the official event. Their Toyota collided with a Ford, hospitalizing both Ogier and Landais. The driver of the Ford later died in hospital.

Heading into 2025, Landais and Ogier continued with a part schedule. They won the opening round in Monte Carlo, before winning a further five events during the season. Landais achieved the ultimate success by winning his first World Rally Championship title alongside Ogier who won his ninth. Their efforts also helped Toyota Gazoo Racing WRT secure the World Constructors' Championship. Landais will continue as Ogier's co-driver at Toyota Gazoo Racing WRT for 2026, completing a partial season consisting of over half the championship events.

== WRC victories ==
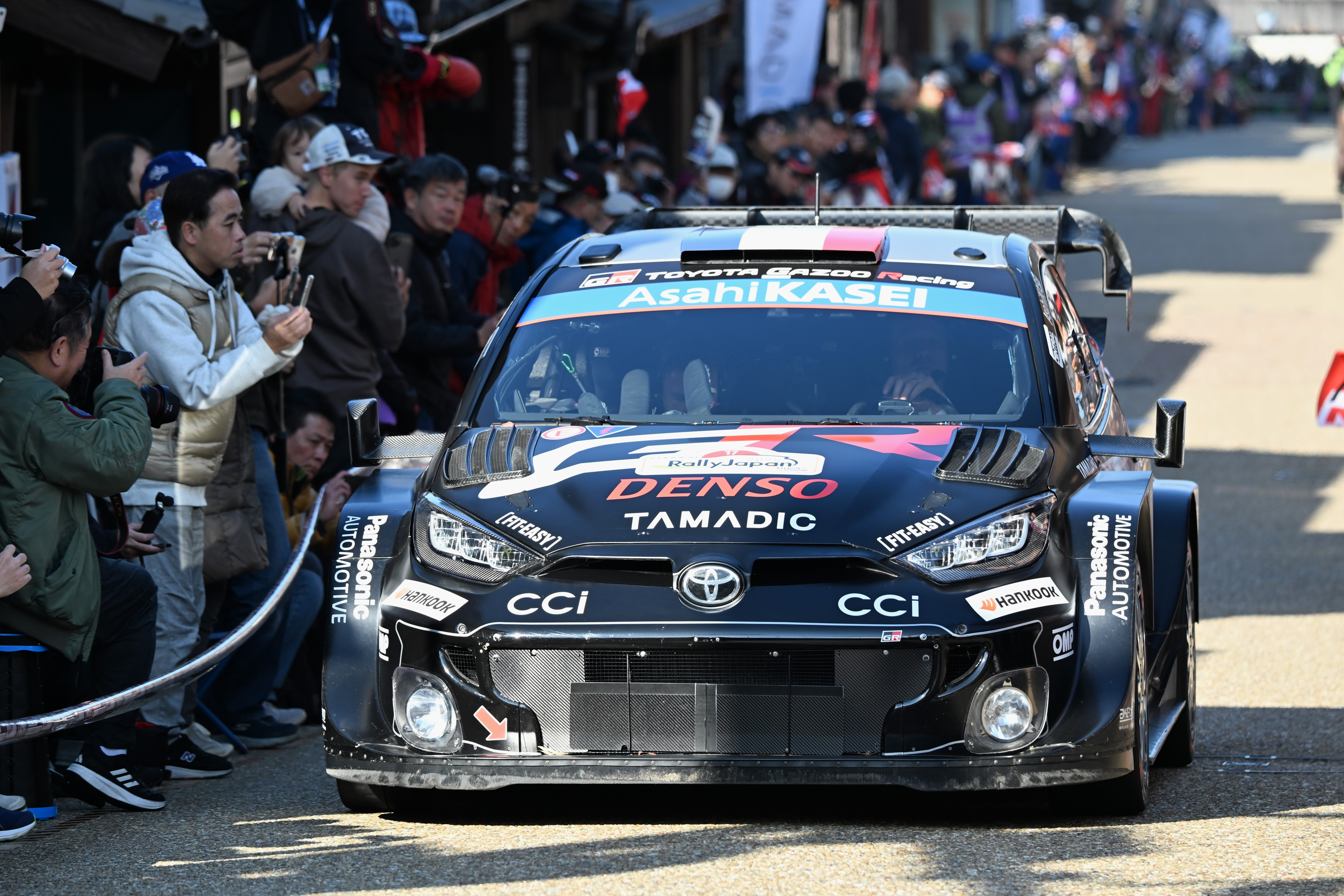
Ogier and Landais at the 2025 Rally Japan

#	Event	Season	Driver	Car
1	(Monaco) 91e Rallye Automobile Monte-Carlo	2023	(France) Sébastien Ogier	Toyota GR Yaris Rally1
2	(Mexico) Rally Guanajuato México 2023	2023	(France) Sébastien Ogier	Toyota GR Yaris Rally1
3	Safari Rally Kenya 2023	2023	(France) Sébastien Ogier	Toyota GR Yaris Rally1
4	2024 Croatia Rally	2024	(France) Sébastien Ogier	Toyota GR Yaris Rally1
5	Vodafone Rally de Portugal 2024	2024	(France) Sébastien Ogier	Toyota GR Yaris Rally1
6	Secto Rally Finland 2024	2024	(France) Sébastien Ogier	Toyota GR Yaris Rally1
7	(Monaco) 93e Rallye Automobile Monte-Carlo	2025	(France) Sébastien Ogier	Toyota GR Yaris Rally1
8	Vodafone Rally de Portugal 2025	2025	(France) Sébastien Ogier	Toyota GR Yaris Rally1
9	(Italy) Rally di Sardegna 2025	2025	(France) Sébastien Ogier	Toyota GR Yaris Rally1
10	Ueno Rally del Paraguay 2025	2025	(France) Sébastien Ogier	Toyota GR Yaris Rally1
11	Rally Chile BIOBÍO 2025	2025	(France) Sébastien Ogier	Toyota GR Yaris Rally1
12	FORUM8 Rally Japan 2025	2025	(France) Sébastien Ogier	Toyota GR Yaris Rally1
13	(Spain) 50th Rally Islas Canarias	2026	(France) Sébastien Ogier	Toyota GR Yaris Rally1
14	(Greece) 70th Acropolis Rally	2026	(France) Sébastien Ogier	Toyota GR Yaris Rally1

== Rally results ==
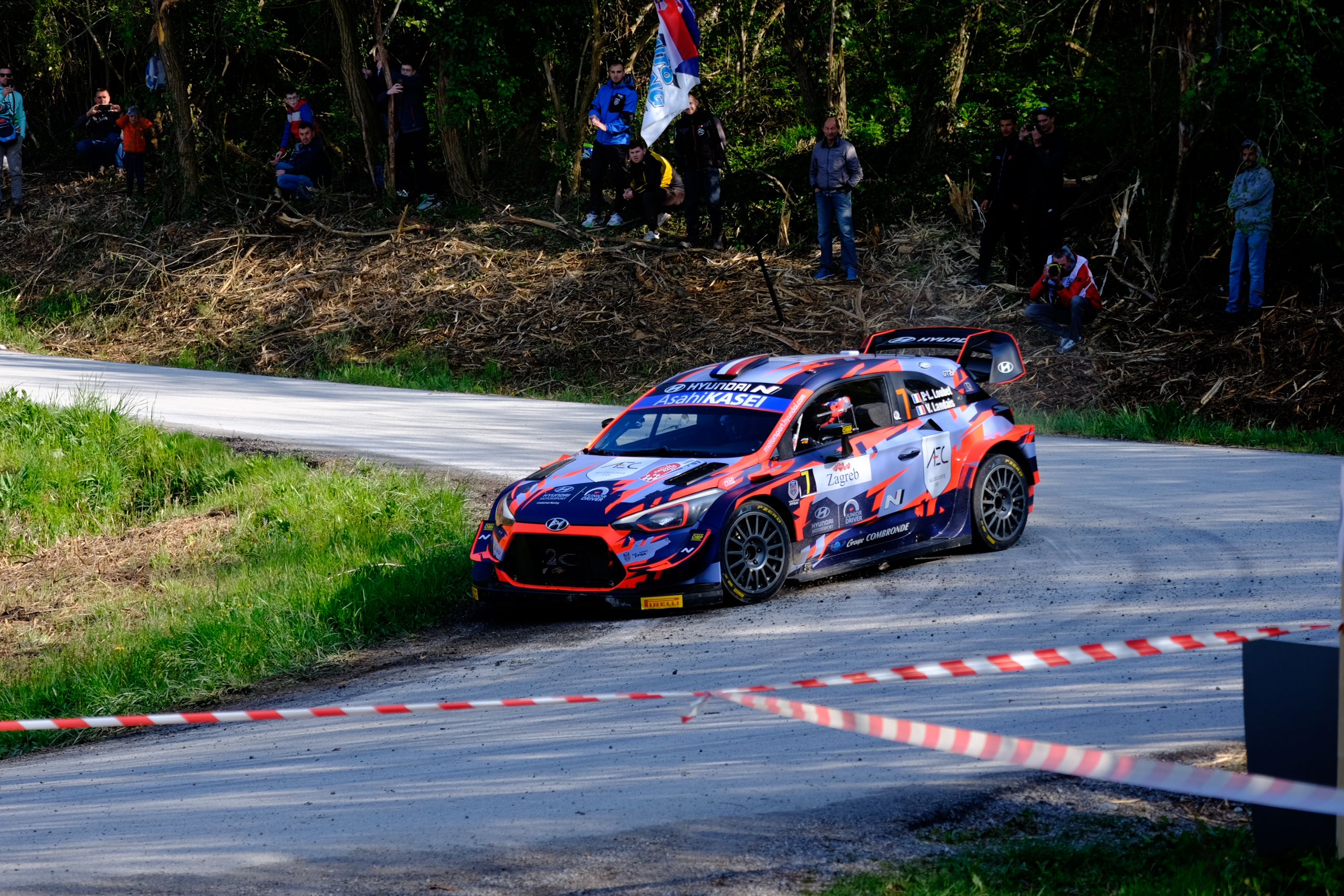
Landais and Loubet at the 2021 Croatia Rally

=== WRC results ===
Year	Entrant	Car	1	2	3	4	5	6	7	8	9	10	11	12	13	14	WDC	Points
2012	Laurent Gracial	Suzuki Swift Sport	MON	SWE	MEX	POR	ARG	GRE	NZL	FIN	GER	GBR	FRA; 40	ITA	ESP		NC	0
2013	Laurent Gracial	Renault Mégane RS	MON	SWE	MEX	POR	ARG	GRE	ITA	FIN	GER	AUS	FRA; Ret	ESP	GBR		NC	0
2014	HRT Rally Team	Peugeot 208 T16	MON	SWE	MEX	POR	ARG	ITA	POL	FIN	GER	AUS	FRA; 50	ESP	GBR		NC	0
2015	Jonathan Hirschi	Peugeot 208 T16	MON; 28	SWE	MEX	ARG	POR; Ret	ITA	POL; Ret	FIN	GER; Ret	AUS					NC	0
2015	Pierre-Louis Loubet	Citroën DS3 R3T Max											FRA; Ret	ESP; 32	GBR; 34		NC	0
2015	Pierre-Louis Loubet	Peugeot 207 S2000	MON	SWE	MEX	ARG	POR; Ret										NC	0
2015	Pierre-Louis Loubet	Citroën DS3 R5						ITA; 17	POL; 18	FIN; Ret	GER; 12	CHN; C	FRA; 25	ESP; 13	GBR; 41	AUS	NC	0
2017	Pierre-Louis Loubet	Citroën DS3 R5	MON	SWE; Ret	MEX												NC	0
2017	Pierre-Louis Loubet	Ford Fiesta R5				FRA; 15	ARG	POR; 25	ITA; 19	POL; 21	FIN; 31	GER; 14	ESP; 11	GBR; 20	AUS		NC	0
2018	BRC Racing Team	Hyundai i20 R5	MON	SWE	MEX	FRA; 23	ARG	POR; 11	ITA; Ret	FIN; 15	GER; Ret	TUR	GBR; Ret	ESP; 18	AUS		NC	0
2019	Pierre-Louis Loubet	Škoda Fabia R5	MON	SWE	MEX	FRA; 44	ARG	CHL	POR; 9	ITA; 11	FIN; 14	GER	TUR				22nd	2
2019	Pierre-Louis Loubet	Škoda Fabia R5 Evo												GBR; 12	ESP; 17	AUS; C	22nd	2
2020	Hyundai 2C Competition	Hyundai i20 Coupe WRC	MON	SWE	MEX	EST; Ret	TUR; Ret	ITA; 7	MNZ								19th	6
2021	Hyundai 2C Competition	Hyundai i20 Coupe WRC	MON; 16	ARC; 39	CRO; 29	POR	ITA	KEN	EST	BEL	FIN	GRE	ESP	MNZ			NC	0
2022	M-Sport Ford WRT	Ford Puma Rally1	MON	SWE	CRO; 47	POR; 7	ITA; 4	KEN	EST; Ret	FIN; Ret	BEL	GRE; 4	NZL	ESP; 10			11th	43
2022	Toyota Gazoo Racing WRT	Toyota GR Yaris Rally1													JPN; 4		11th	43
2023	Toyota Gazoo Racing WRT	Toyota GR Yaris Rally1	MON; 1	SWE	MEX; 1	CRO; 5	POR	ITA; 14	KEN; 1	EST	FIN	GRE; 10	CHL	EUR; 4	JPN; 2		5th	133
2024	Toyota Gazoo Racing WRT	Toyota GR Yaris Rally1	MON; 2	SWE	KEN	CRO; 1	POR; 1	ITA; 2	POL; WD	LAT; 2	FIN; 1	GRE; 16	CHL; 36	EUR; Ret	JPN; 2		4th	191
2025	Toyota Gazoo Racing WRT	Toyota GR Yaris Rally1	MON; 1	SWE	KEN	ESP; 2	POR; 1	ITA; 1	GRE; 2	EST	FIN; 3	PAR; 1	CHL; 1	EUR; 29	JPN; 1	SAU; 3	1st	293
2026	Toyota Gazoo Racing WRT	Toyota GR Yaris Rally1	MON; 3	SWE	KEN; 11	CRO	ESP; 1	POR; 6	JPN; 2	GRE; 1	EST; 5	FIN; WD	PAR; 34	CHL; 2	ITA; 2		4th	189

* Season still in progress.

=== WRC-2 results ===
Year	Entrant	Car	1	2	3	4	5	6	7	8	9	10	11	12	13	14	WDC	Points
2015	Jonathan Hirschi	Peugeot 208 T16	MON; 19	SWE	MEX	ARG	POR; Ret	ITA	POL; Ret	FIN	GER; Ret	AUS	FRA	ESP	GBR		NC	0
2016	Pierre-Louis Loubet	Peugeot 207 S2000	MON	SWE	MEX	ARG	POR; Ret										10th	36
2016	Pierre-Louis Loubet	Citroën DS3 R5						ITA; 6	POL; 6	FIN; Ret	GER; 5	CHN; C	FRA; 5	ESP	GBR	AUS	10th	36
2017	Pierre-Louis Loubet	Citroën DS3 R5	MON	SWE; Ret	MEX												10th	39
2017	Pierre-Louis Loubet	Ford Fiesta R5				FRA; 6	ARG	POR; 10	ITA; 5	POL	FIN; 7	GER; 5	ESP	GBR; 8	AUS		10th	39
2018	Pierre-Louis Loubet	Hyundai i20 R5	MON	SWE	MEX	FRA; 6	ARG	POR; 4	ITA; Ret	FIN; 5	GER; Ret	TUR	GBR; Ret	ESP; 7	AUS		11th	36
2019	Pierre-Louis Loubet	Škoda Fabia R5	MON	SWE	MEX	FRA; 10	ARG	CHL	POR; 1	ITA; 1	FIN; 4	GER	TUR				1st	91
2019	Pierre-Louis Loubet	Škoda Fabia R5 Evo												GBR; 2	ESP; 5	AUS; C	1st	91
