= Jourdan Serderidis =

Greek rally driver (born 1964)

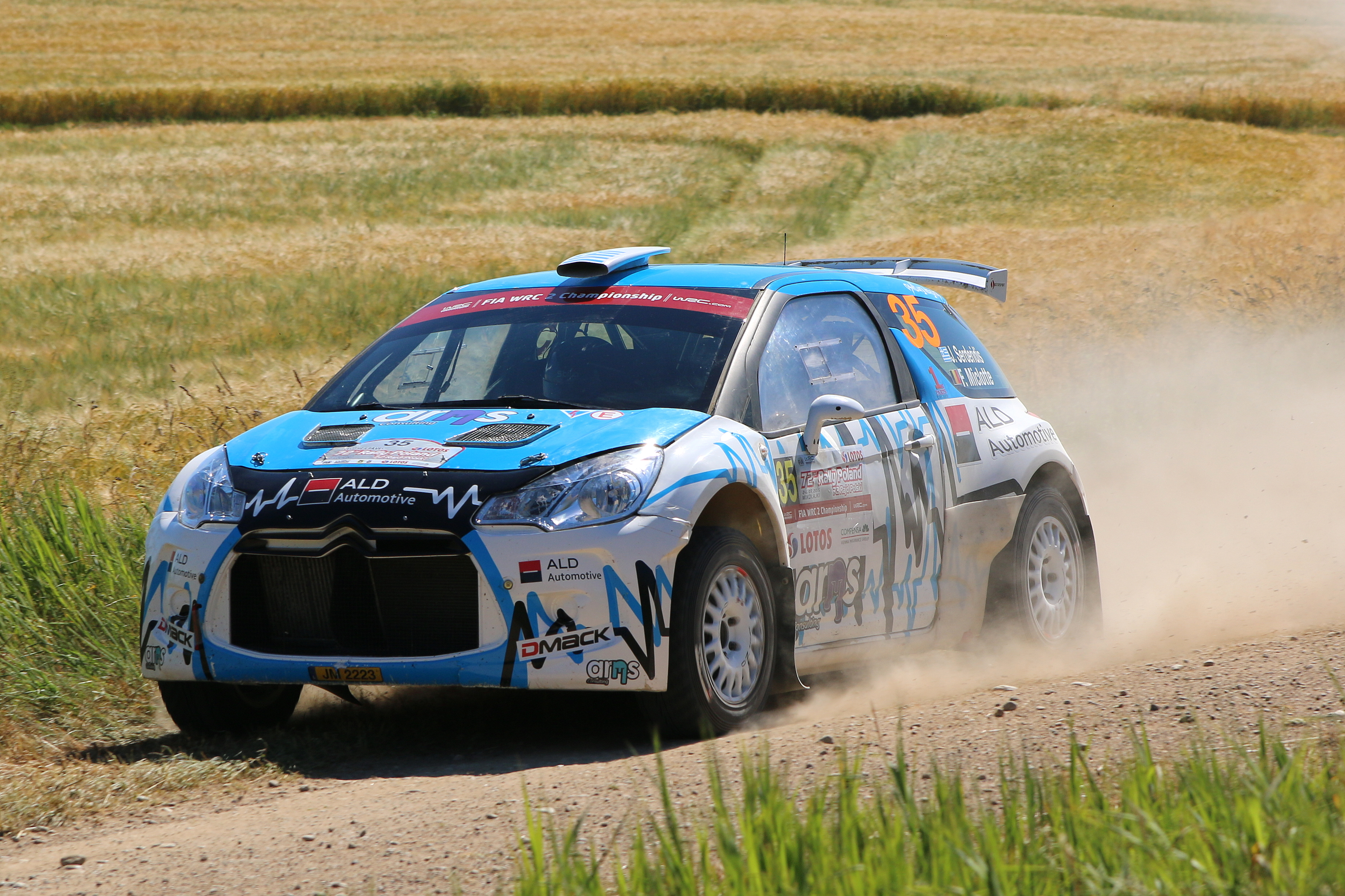

Personal information
- Nationality: (Greece) Greek
- Full name: Iordánis Serderídis
- Born: 29 January 1964 (age 62)

World Rally Championship record
- Years active: 2013–2018, 2021–present
- Co-driver: (Belgium) Erwin Mombaerts (Belgium) Morgane Rose (Belgium) Frédéric Miclotte (Belgium) William Mergny (Belgium) Lara Vanneste (France) Andy Malfoy
- Teams: M-Sport Ford World Rally Team
- Rallies: 40
- Championships: 0
- Rally wins: 0
- Podiums: 0
- Stage wins: 0
- Total points: 15
- First rally: 2013 Rally GB
- Last rally: 2026 Acropolis Rally

Iordánis Serderídis (Greek: Ιορδάνης Σερδερίδης), better known as Jourdan Serderidis (born 21 January 1964) is a Belgian-Greek pay-per-drive rally driver from Dorinne, Yvoir. He came tenth at the 2018 Rally Australia, then took a three-year break, returning for the 2021 Acropolis Rally. He finished seventh on the 2022 Safari Rally. He drives a Ford Puma Rally1. He won the WRC Trophy Champion title in 2017.

According to his eWRC-results.com profile, Serderidis' first recorded rally was in 2012. He has taken a number of overall wins, especially in the Belgium, such as his 2017 Rallye des Ardennes win or his 2022 Rallye de Hannut victory.

In 2025, Serderidis finished third on the MRF Tyres East African Safari Classic Rally, driving a Porsche 911 SC and co-driven by former WRC driver Grégoire Munster.

== Rally results ==
=== WRC results ===
Year	Entrant	Car	1	2	3	4	5	6	7	8	9	10	11	12	13	14	WDC	Points
2013	Jourdan Serderidis	Ford Fiesta R5	MON	SWE	MEX	POR	ARG	GRE	ITA	FIN	GER	AUS	FRA	ESP	GBR; 32		NC	0
2014	Jourdan Serderidis	Ford Fiesta R5	MON; 31	SWE; Ret	MEX	POR	ARG	ITA	POL; 30	FIN	GER	AUS; Ret	FRA; 53	ESP; 40	GBR; 33		NC	0
2015	Jourdan Serderidis	Citroën DS3 R5	MON; Ret	SWE	MEX; 19	ARG	POR	ITA	POL; 45	FIN	GER; 40	AUS	FRA; 50	ESP	GBR		NC	0
2016	Jourdan Serderidis	Citroën DS3 R5	MON; Ret	SWE	MEX	ARG	POR	ITA	POL	FIN	GER; 37	CHN; C	FRA	ESP	GBR	AUS; 32	NC	0
2017	Jourdan Serderidis	Citroën DS3 WRC	MON; 29	SWE	MEX	FRA	ARG	POR	ITA	POL; 30	FIN	GER; 25	ESP; 33	GBR; 42	AUS; 9		22nd	2
2018	M-Sport Ford WRT	Ford Fiesta WRC	MON	SWE	MEX	FRA	ARG	POR	ITA	FIN	GER; 18	TUR	GBR	ESP	AUS; 10		30th	1
2021	M-Sport Ford WRT	Ford Fiesta WRC	MON	ARC	CRO	POR	ITA	KEN	EST	BEL	GRE; 23	FIN	ESP	MNZ			NC	0
2022	Jourdan Serderidis	Škoda Fabia Rally2 evo	MON	SWE	CRO	POR	ITA; 20										23rd	6
2022	M-Sport Ford WRT	Ford Puma Rally1						KEN; 7	EST	FIN	BEL	GRE; Ret	NZL	ESP; 28	JPN; WD		23rd	6
2023	M-Sport Ford WRT	Ford Puma Rally1	MON; 24	SWE	MEX; 25	CRO	POR	ITA	KEN	EST	FIN	GRE; 17	CHL	EUR	JPN		NC	0
2024	M-Sport Ford WRT	Ford Puma Rally1	MON; 25	SWE	KEN; 9	CRO	POR	ITA	POL	LAT	FIN	GRE; 14	CHL	EUR; 20	JPN		29th	2
2025	M-Sport Ford WRT	Ford Puma Rally1	MON	SWE; 33	KEN; 8	ESP	POR	ITA; 25	GRE; Ret	EST	FIN	PAR	CHL	EUR	JPN	SAU	17th	4
2026	M-Sport Ford WRT	Ford Puma Rally1	MON	SWE	KEN	CRO	ESP	POR	JPN	GRE; 32	EST	FIN	PAR	CHL	ITA	SAU; C	NC*	0*
