= List of World Rally Championship manufacturers =

This list includes manufacturers and teams that entered the World Rally Championship for Manufacturers in the seasons where it was necessary to register or nominate teams, and/or where it was possible to have non-manufacturer teams. A true list of all marques entered over the entire WRC history could potentially number into the hundreds, indeed the FIA historic database of homologated cars includes thousands of models from hundreds of manufacturers up to 2006, many of which would have been eligible for inclusion. Cars from 34 different manufacturers entered the first WRC event alone, the 1973 Monte Carlo Rally.

In this list the manufacturer is presented in the first column, this is the entity that would be responsible for car homologations (and approving any third party to act as competitor in its name). In the second column is the names of teams, which may not necessarily be a company, and may have sponsors included. The 2023 WRC sporting regulation defines a team as "made up of the competitor, the crew and support personnel."

== History ==
From the inception of the WRC in 1973 to 1992 the World Rally Championship for Manufacturers functioned more like a championship for makes or marques. 'Official' teams were not necessary as independent entries would score without direct involvement of the manufacturer. Championship points were scored by the best finishing car of each manufacturer within the top 10 overall classified finishers. The 1986 season was an exceptional year in this time period as the requirement for manufacturers to directly register teams eligible for the championship was used for one year only, before being reintroduced permanently in 1993.

Therefore, any manufacturer with cars homologated in the following groups could be considered a 'WRC manufacturer' subject to their car being entered into a WRC rally by any party at any time. This would also include cars entered into support championships such as the Production World Rally Championship and 2-Litre Cup; and of such formulae as kit-cars, Super 2000, etc:

- Group 1
- Group 2
- Group 3
- Group 4
- Group A
- Group B
- Group N
- Group R
- Plus others of non-FIA standard potentially permitted by national ASNs

== 1986 World Rally Championship for Manufacturers ==
Manufacturers had to register teams to be eligible to score points towards the 1986 manufacturer's championship.

| Manufacturer | Entrant(s) |
|---|---|
| (Germany) Audi | Audi Sport |
| (United Kingdom) Austin Rover | Austin Rover WRT |
| (France) Citroën | Citroën Compétitions |
| (United Kingdom) Ford | Ford Motor Co Ltd |
| (Italy) Lancia | Martini Lancia |
| (Japan) Mazda | Mazda Rally Team Europe |
| (Germany) Opel | |
| (France) Peugeot | Peugeot Talbot Sport |
| (France) Renault | Philips Renault Elf |
| (Czech Republic) Škoda | Škoda Team/Škoda GB |
| (Japan) Subaru | Fuji Heavy Industries |
| (Japan) Toyota | Toyota Team Europe |
| (Germany) Volkswagen | Volkswagen Motorsport |

== 1993–2009 World Rally Championships for Manufacturers ==
From the 1993 season until 2006 inclusive, the manufacturers championship could be entered by manufacturers, teams designated by a manufacturer, or by other teams willing to contest every round using cars of the same make. All were considered as 'manufacturers' by the FIA and two cars had to be entered in all cases. From 1999 the two cars entered by manufacturers or teams new to the championship had to be World Rally Cars. Only Mitsubishi continued past 1997 with Group A cars, contesting in World Rally Cars only from 2002.

In 2006, manufacturers could be of two categories: Manufacturer 1 or Manufacturer 2. The first required commitment to all rounds using the most recently homologated World Rally Car and parts. The latter required commitment to a minimum number of rounds, had restrictions on who could drive and could not use cars or parts homologated that year. In 2007 these two categories were renamed Manufacturer and Manufacturer Team.

| Manufacturer | Team | Type | 93 | 94 | 95 | 96 | 97 | 98 | 99 | 00 | 01 | 02 | 03 | 04 | 05 | 06 | 07 | 08 | 09 |
|---|---|---|---|---|---|---|---|---|---|---|---|---|---|---|---|---|---|---|---|
| (United Kingdom) Ford | (BP) Ford (Abu Dhabi) (Motor Co Ltd/WRT) | M | | | | | | | | | | | | | | | | | |
| (United Kingdom) Ford | Mike Little Preparations | D | | | | | | | | | | | | | | | | | |
| (United Kingdom) Ford | SMS AG Revo Ingenieure | D | | | | | | | | | | | | | | | | | |
| (United Kingdom) Ford | R.A.S. Ford | M | | | | | | | | | | | | | | | | | |
| (United Kingdom) Ford | Stobart (VK) Ford Rally Team | M2 | | | | | | | | | | | | | | | | | |
| (United Kingdom) Ford | Munchi's Ford WRT | M2 | | | | | | | | | | | | | | | | | |
| (Italy) Lancia | Jolly Club, Astra Racing | D | | | | | | | | | | | | | | | | | |
| (Japan) Mitsubishi | (Marlboro) Mitsubishi Ralliart | M | | | | | | | | | | | | | | | | | |
| (Japan) Mitsubishi | Mitsubishi Oil Ralliart, Mitsubishi Ralliart Australia | D | | | | | | | | | | | | | | | | | |
| (Japan) Mitsubishi | Mitsubishi Ralliart Germany | D | | | | | | | | | | | | | | | | | |
| (Japan) Mitsubishi | Les Walkden Racing | D | | | | | | | | | | | | | | | | | |
| (Japan) Mitsubishi | Mitsubishi Ralliart Sweden, Mitsubishi Lancer Team, Mitsubishi Ralliart Zushi, Mitsubishi Ralliart Finland, Petronas Mitsubishi Ralliart | D | | | | | | | | | | | | | | | | | |
| (Japan) Mitsubishi | Mitsubishi Motors | M | | | | | | | | | | | | | | | | | |
| (Japan) Subaru | (555) Subaru WRT | M | | | | | | | | | | | | | | | | | |
| (Japan) Subaru | Eklund Team Europe, Subaru M.S.G., A.R.T. Engineering | D | | | | | | | | | | | | | | | | | |
| (Japan) Subaru | Subaru Rally Team Australia | D | | | | | | | | | | | | | | | | | |
| (Japan) Toyota (Note: Toyota were excluded from the 1995 championship) | Toyota Castrol Team | M | | | | | | | | | | | | | | | | | |
| (Japan) Toyota | Grifone | D | | | | | | | | | | | | | | | | | |
| (France) Renault | Société Diac | D | | | | | | | | | | | | | | | | | |
| (Czech Republic) Škoda | Škoda Motorsport | M | | | | | | | | | | | | | | | | | |
| (Czech Republic) Škoda | Red Bull Škoda | M2 | | | | | | | | | | | | | | | | | |
| (Spain) Seat | Seat Sport | M | | | | | | | | | | | | | | | | | |
| (France) Peugeot | Peugeot Esso / (Marlboro) Peugeot Total | M | | | | | | | | | | | | | | | | | |
| (France) Peugeot | OMV Peugeot Norway | M2 | | | | | | | | | | | | | | | | | |
| (South Korea) Hyundai | Hyundai (Castrol) WRT | M | | | | | | | | | | | | | | | | | |
| (France) Citroën | Citroën Total WRT | M | | | | | | | | | | | | | | | | | |
| (France) Citroën | Kronos Total Citroën WRT | M | | | | | | | | | | | | | | | | | |
| (France) Citroën | OMV Kronos Citroën WRT | M2 | | | | | | | | | | | | | | | | | |
| (France) Citroën | Citroën Junior Team | M2 | | | | | | | | | | | | | | | | | |
| (Japan) Suzuki | Suzuki World Rally Team | M | | | | | | | | | | | | | | | | | |
| Manufacturer | Team | Type | 93 | 94 | 95 | 96 | 97 | 98 | 99 | 00 | 01 | 02 | 03 | 04 | 05 | 06 | 07 | 08 | 09 |
Types: M = Manufacturer, D = Designated team, M2 = Manufacturer 2 / Manufacturer Team

== 2010–2016 World Rally Championships for Manufacturers ==
From 2010, Manufacturer Team became WRC Team with similar terms although running only one car was permitted. From 2012, WRC Teams could only score if a corresponding Manufacturer was also running the same car homologation, however this doesn't appear to have been enforced in the case of Mini and Lotos Team WRC in 2013.

| Manufacturer | Team | Type | 10 | 11 | 12 | 13 | 14 | 15 | 16 |
|---|---|---|---|---|---|---|---|---|---|
| (France) Citroën | Citroën Total (Abu Dhabi) WRT | M | | | | | | | |
| (France) Citroën | Ice 1 Racing | T | | | | | | | |
| (France) Citroën | Petter Solberg WRT | T | | | | | | | |
| (France) Citroën | Van Merksteijn Motorsport | T | | | | | | | |
| (France) Citroën | Citroën Junior WRT | T | | | | | | | |
| (France) Citroën | Qatar World Rally Team | T | | | | | | | |
| (France) Citroën | Abu Dhabi Citroën Total WRT | T | | | | | | | |
| (United Kingdom) Ford | (BP) Ford (Abu Dhabi) WRT | M | | | | | | | |
| (United Kingdom) Ford | Ferm Powertools WRT | T | | | | | | | |
| (United Kingdom) Ford | Monster WRT | T | | | | | | | |
| (United Kingdom) Ford | Munchi's Ford WRT | T | | | | | | | |
| (United Kingdom) Ford | (Stobart) M-Sport Ford RT | T | | | | | | | |
| (United Kingdom) Ford | Team Abu Dhabi | T | | | | | | | |
| (United Kingdom) Ford | Adapta World Rally Team | T | | | | | | | |
| (United Kingdom) Ford | Brazil WRT | T | | | | | | | |
| (United Kingdom) Ford | (Qatar) M-Sport WRT (Note: Allowed to compete without manufacturer 'Ford' in the name under a waiver from the FIA) | M | | | | | | | |
| (United Kingdom) Ford | Qatar World Rally Team | T | | | | | | | |
| (United Kingdom) Ford | Jipocar Czech National Team | T | | | | | | | |
| (United Kingdom) Ford | Lotos Team WRC | T | | | | | | | |
| (United Kingdom) Ford | RK M-Sport WRT | T | | | | | | | |
| (United Kingdom) Ford | FWRT s.r.l. | T | | | | | | | |
| (United Kingdom) Ford | DMACK World Rally Team | T | | | | | | | |
| (United Kingdom) Ford | Yazeed Racing | T | | | | | | | |
| (United Kingdom) MINI | Mini WRC Team | M | | | | | | | |
| (United Kingdom) MINI | Brazil WRT | T | | | | | | | |
| (United Kingdom) MINI | Lotos Team WRC (Note: Were allowed to compete without a corresponding manufacturer team under a waiver from the FIA) | T | | | | | | | |
| (Germany) Volkswagen | Volkswagen Motorsport | M | | | | | | | |
| (Germany) Volkswagen | Volkswagen Motorsport II | T | | | | | | | |
| (South Korea) Hyundai | Hyundai Motorsport | M | | | | | | | |
| (South Korea) Hyundai | Hyundai Motorsport N | T | | | | | | | |
Types: M = Manufacturer, T = WRC Team

== 2017–present World Rally Championships for Manufacturers ==
From 2017 to 2019 no WRC Teams could run, only manufacturer entries. This was reverted in 2020, however teams needed to have an affiliation with a corresponding manufacturer.

| Manufacturer | Team | Type | 2017 | 2018 | 2019 | 2020 | 2021 | 2022 | 2023 | 2024 | 2025 |
|---|---|---|---|---|---|---|---|---|---|---|---|
| (France) Citroën | Citroën Total (Abu Dhabi) WRT | M | | | | | | | | | |
| (United Kingdom) Ford | M-Sport Ford World Rally Team | M | | | | | | | | | |
| (South Korea) Hyundai | Hyundai Shell Mobis WRT | M | | | | | | | | | |
| (South Korea) Hyundai | Hyundai 2C Compétition | T | | | | | | | | | |
| (Japan) Toyota | Toyota Gazoo Racing WRT | M | | | | | | | | | |
| (Japan) Toyota | Toyota Gazoo Racing WRT NG | T | | | | | | | | | |
| (Japan) Toyota | Toyota Gazoo Racing WRT2 | T | | | | | | | | | |
Types: M = Manufacturer, T = WRC Team

== See also ==
- List of World Rally Championship Manufacturers' champions
- List of World Rally Championship Drivers' champions
- List of World Rally Championship Co-Drivers' champions
