= 2026 WRC3 Championship =

Motor racing competition

The 2026 FIA WRC3 Championship was the thirteenth season of WRC3, a rallying championship for organised and governed by the Fédération Internationale de l'Automobile as the third-highest tier of international rallying. It was opened to privateers and teams using cars complying with Group Rally3 regulations. The championship began in January 2026 with the Monte Carlo Rally and concluded in October 2026 with the Rally Italia Sardegna, and run in support of the 2026 World Rally Championship.

== Calendar ==
The 2026 season was scheduled to be contested over fourteen rounds across Europe, Africa, South America and Asia, but it was ultimately reduced to thirteen rounds.

Round	Start date	Finish date	Rally	Rally headquarters	Surface	Stages	Distance	Ref.
1	22 January	25 January	(Monaco) Rallye Automobile Monte Carlo	Gap, Provence-Alpes-Côte d'Azur, France	Mixed (Note: The Monte Carlo Rally was run on a tarmac and snow surface.)	17	339.15 km	
2	12 February	15 February	Rally Sweden	Umeå, Västerbotten County, Sweden	Snow	18	300.66 km	
3	12 March	15 March	Safari Rally Kenya	Nairobi, Nakuru County, Kenya	Gravel	20	350.52 km	
4	9 April	12 April	Croatia Rally	Rijeka, Primorje-Gorski Kotar County, Croatia	Tarmac	20	300.28 km	
5	23 April	26 April	(Spain) Rally Islas Canarias	Las Palmas, Gran Canaria, Spain	Tarmac	18	322.04 km	
6	7 May	10 May	Rally de Portugal	Matosinhos, Porto, Portugal	Gravel	23	344.91 km	
7	28 May	31 May	Rally Japan	Toyota, Aichi, Japan	Tarmac	20	302.82 km	
8	25 June	28 June	Acropolis Rally Greece	Loutraki, Corinthia, Greece	Gravel	17	323.31 km	
9	16 July	19 July	Rally Estonia	Tartu, Estonia	Gravel	18	301.80 km	
10	30 July	2 August	Rally Finland	Jyväskylä, Central Finland, Finland	Gravel	20	316.60 km	
11	27 August	30 August	Rally del Paraguay	Encarnación, Itapúa, Paraguay	Gravel	22	358.88 km	
12	10 September	13 September	Rally Chile	Talcahuano, Biobío, Chile	Gravel	16	311.70 km	
13	1 October	4 October	(Italy) Rally Italia Sardegna	Alghero, Sardinia, Italy	Gravel	17	306.92 km	

The 2026 Rally Saudi Arabia was included on the original calendar published by WRC Promoter GmbH and was scheduled to be the fourteenth round of the championship, but was later removed from the season:

Start date	Finish date	Rally	Rally headquarters	Surface	Stages	Distance	Removal reason	Ref.
11 November	14 November	Rally Saudi Arabia	Jeddah, Mecca Province, Saudi Arabia	Gravel	16	320.34 km	2026 Iran war	

A map showing the locations of the rallies in the 2026 championship. Event headquarters were marked with black dots. Removed event was marked with a red dot.

=== Calendar changes ===
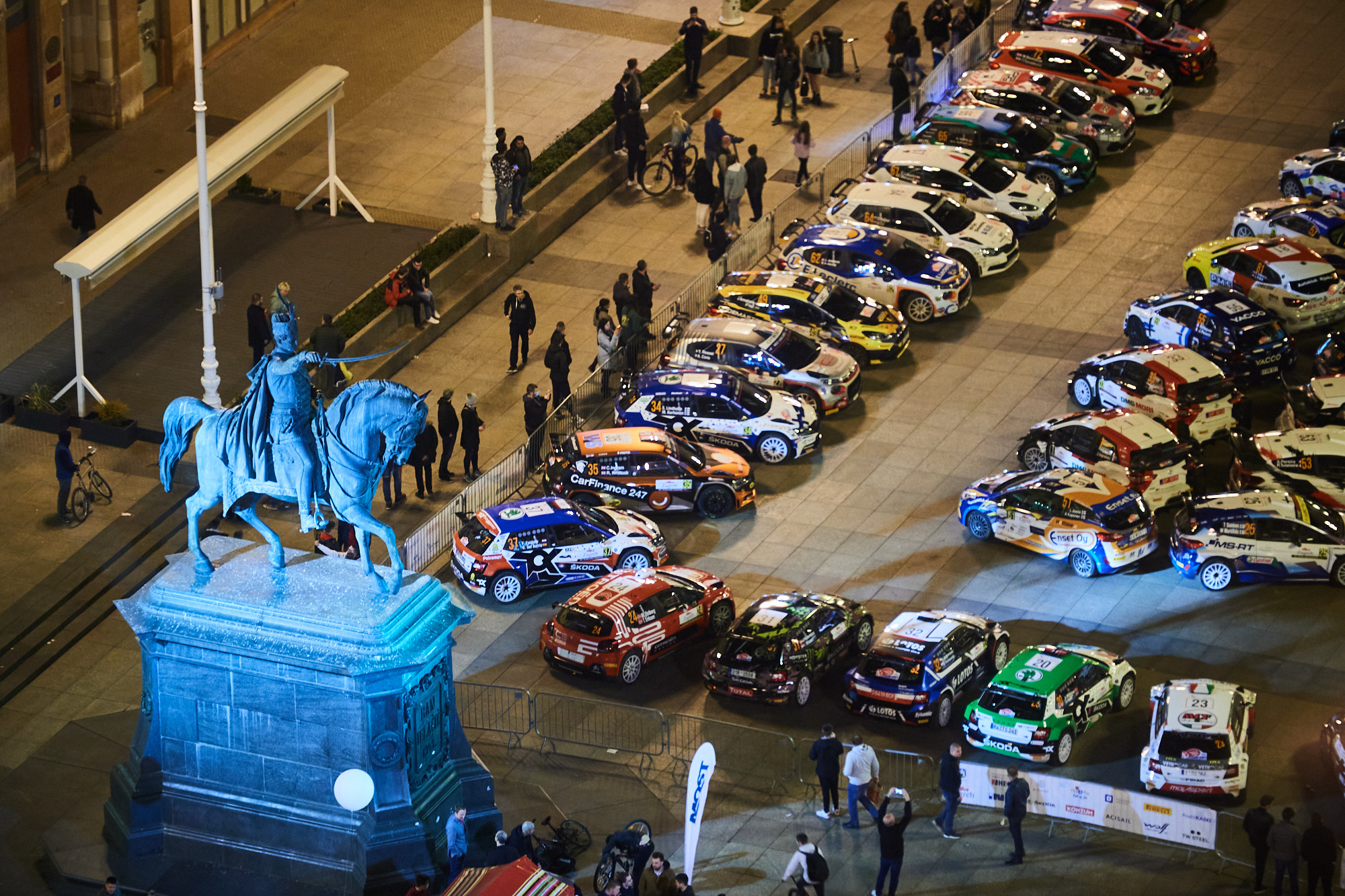
The Croatia Rally returned to the championship after being held as a European Rally Championship event in 2025.

- The Croatia Rally returned to the championship after missing the 2025 season, replacing the Central European Rally. The rally featured new headquarters in Rijeka, instead of Zagreb and brand new set of mixed tarmac stages.
- The Italian Rally and Rally Japan swapped calendar slots, and the new Rally di Roma Capitale was confirmed to replace the Rally Italia Sardegna from 2027 onwards.
- The organisers of the Acropolis Rally announced the change of its headquarters, with Loutraki served as the new base after five years in Lamia.
- The Rally Saudi Arabia was set to hold the season finale, but it was removed from the calendar in September due to the 2026 Iran war. An all-gravel round in Catalunya was reportedly mooted as a replacement, however this did not materialise as a deadline for its confirmation was not met.

== Entrants ==
The following crews were set to enter the WRC3 Championship in 2026:

Car	Entrant	Driver name	Co-driver name	Rounds
Ford Fiesta Rally3	(Turkey) Castrol Ford Team Türkiye	(Turkey) Ali Türkkan	(Turkey) Oytun Albayrak	2, 4, 6
Ford Fiesta Rally3	(Turkey) Team Petrol Ofisi	(Turkey) Kerem Kazaz	(France) Corentin Silvestre	2, 4, 6
Ford Fiesta Rally3	Entered under driver's name	(Italy) Matteo Fontana	(Italy) Alessandro Arnaboldi	1–2, 4, 6, 8
Ford Fiesta Rally3	Entered under driver's name	(France) Ghjuvanni Rossi	(France) Kylian Sarmezan	1, 4–5, 7
Ford Fiesta Rally3	Entered under driver's name	(France) Eric Royère	(France) Alexis Grenier	1–2
Ford Fiesta Rally3	Entered under driver's name	(France) Eric Royère	(Belgium) Maxime Andernack	6
Ford Fiesta Rally3	Entered under driver's name	(France) Jean-Christophe Guibert	(France) Laurent Gracial	1
Ford Fiesta Rally3	Entered under driver's name	(Poland) Tymoteusz Abramowski	(Poland) Jakub Wróbel	2, 5
Ford Fiesta Rally3	Entered under driver's name	(Peru) André Martínez	(Argentina) Matías Aranguren	2, 6
Ford Fiesta Rally3	Entered under driver's name	(Greece) Georgios Vasilakis	(Republic of Ireland) Allan Harryman	2–3, 7–8
Ford Fiesta Rally3	Entered under driver's name	(Germany) Nicolas Otto	(Portugal) Hugo Magalhães	2, 4–5, 7
Ford Fiesta Rally3	Entered under driver's name	(Spain) Raúl Hernández	(Spain) José Murado	2, 4–6
Ford Fiesta Rally3	Entered under driver's name	(Spain) Gil Membrado	(Spain) Adrián Pérez	2, 4–6
Ford Fiesta Rally3	Entered under driver's name	(Bolivia) Nataniel Bruun	(Spain) Sergio Fernández	3
Ford Fiesta Rally3	Entered under driver's name	(Bolivia) Nataniel Bruun	(Spain) Javier Martínez	6, 8
Ford Fiesta Rally3	Entered under driver's name	(India) Naveen Puligilla	(India) Musa Sherif	3
Ford Fiesta Rally3	Entered under driver's name	(Kenya) Nikhil Sachania	(Kenya) Deep Patel	3
Ford Fiesta Rally3	Entered under driver's name	(India) Dean Mascarenhas	(India) Gagan Karumbaiah	5
Ford Fiesta Rally3	Entered under driver's name	(Poland) Tymek Abramowski	(Poland) Jakub Wróbel	8
Ford Fiesta Rally3	Entered under driver's name	(Poland) Grzegorz Bonder	(Poland) Kamil Heller	8
Ford Fiesta Rally3	Entered under driver's name	(Greece) "Flandy"	(Greece) Konstantinos Stefanis	8
Ford Fiesta Rally3	Entered under driver's name	(Greece) Nikolaos Ntavaris	(Greece) Konstantinos Makris	8
Renault Clio Rally3	(Spain) Escudería Daute Realejos	(Spain) Santiago Pérez	(Spain) Benito Sacramento	5
Renault Clio Rally3	(Japan) Toyota Gazoo Racing WRT NG	(Finland) Jarkko Nikara	(Japan) Tomiya Maekawa	6
Renault Clio Rally3	Entered under driver's name	(France) Olivier Courtois	(France) Hubert Risser	1

== Results and standings ==
=== Season summary ===
Round	Event	Winning driver	Winning co-driver	Winning entrant	Winning time	Report	Ref.
1	(Monaco) Rallye Automobile Monte Carlo	(France) Eric Royère	(France) Alexis Grenier	(France) Eric Royère	5:36:47.5	Report	
2	Rally Sweden	(Italy) Matteo Fontana	(Italy) Alessandro Arnaboldi	(Italy) Matteo Fontana	2:54:30.5	Report	
3	Safari Rally Kenya	(Greece) Georgios Vasilakis	(Republic of Ireland) Allan Harryman	(Greece) Georgios Vasilakis	4:25:07.7	Report	
4	Croatia Rally	(Turkey) Ali Türkkan	(Turkey) Oytun Albayrak	(Turkey) Castrol Ford Team Türkiye	3:07:01.1	Report	
5	(Spain) Rally Islas Canarias	(Spain) Gil Membrado	(Spain) Adrián Pérez	(Spain) Gil Membrado	3:03:28.2	Report	
6	Rally de Portugal	(Italy) Matteo Fontana	(Italy) Alessandro Arnaboldi	(Italy) Matteo Fontana	4:23:26.8	Report	
7	Rally Japan	(France) Ghjuvanni Rossi	(France) Kylian Sarmezan	(France) Ghjuvanni Rossi	3:45:52.5	Report	
8	Acropolis Rally Greece	(Italy) Matteo Fontana	(Italy) Alessandro Arnaboldi	(Italy) Matteo Fontana	4:08:21.5	Report	
9	Rally Estonia	(Poland) Tymoteusz Abramowski	(Poland) Jakub Wróbel	(Poland) Tymoteusz Abramowski	2:52:35.5	Report	
10	Rally Finland	(Spain) Gil Membrado	(Spain) Adrián Pérez	(Spain) Gil Membrado	2:48:29.0	Report	
11	Rally del Paraguay	(Bolivia) Nataniel Bruun	(Argentina) Mario Javier del Riego	(Bolivia) Nataniel Bruun	3:42:02.3	Report	
12	Rally Chile	(Turkey) Ali Türkkan	(Turkey) Bilge Ayan	(Turkey) Castrol Ford Team Türkiye	3:19:14.9	Report	
13	(Italy) Rally Italia Sardegna	(France) Eric Royère	(Belgium) Maxime Andernack	(France) Eric Royère	4:17:49.2	Report	
–	Rally Saudi Arabia	Rally removed (due to the 2026 Iran war)				Report	

=== Scoring system ===
Position	1st	2nd	3rd	4th	5th	6th	7th	8th	9th	10th
Points	25	17	15	12	10	8	6	4	2	1

=== FIA WRC3 Championship for Drivers ===
Pos.	Driver	MON (Monaco)	SWE (Sweden)	KEN (Kenya)	CRO (Croatia)	ESP (Spain)	POR (Portugal)	JPN (Japan)	GRE (Greece)	EST (Estonia)	FIN (Finland)	PAR (Paraguay)	CHL (Chile)	ITA (Italy)	Points
1	(Italy) Matteo Fontana	2	1		6		1		1		2				117
2	(Spain) Gil Membrado		4		2	1	4				1		6		99
3	(Poland) Tymoteusz Abramowski		2			2			2	1	3			WD	91
4	(France) Eric Royère	1	6				6					2	10	1	84
5	(Turkey) Ali Türkkan		8		1		2				7		1		77
6	(Bolivia) Nataniel Bruun			4			WD		4	4	11	1	WD		61
7	(Germany) Nicolas Otto		Ret		5	4		2		2					56
8	(France) Ghjuvanni Rossi	3			Ret	3		1				Ret			55
9	(Peru) André Martinez		5				3			3		Ret	4		52
10	(Greece) Georgios Vasilakis		7	1				Ret	WD				11	2	48
11	(Spain) Raúl Hernández		3		4	6	5								45
12	(Turkey) Kerem Kazaz		9		3		Ret			6	5		Ret		35
13	(India) Naveen Puligilla			3								3	12		30
14	(Finland) Jarkko Nikara						7			7	4				24
15	(Kenya) Nikhil Sachania			2											17
16	(Chile) Felipe Padilla												2		17
17	(Greece) Andreas Vardinogiannis								3						15
18	(Peru) Alex Heilbrunn												3		15
19	(Japan) Kanta Yanaguida									5	Ret				10
20	(Peru) Eduardo Castro											Ret	5		10
21	(Spain) Santiago Pérez					5									10
22	(Greece) Nikos Davaris								5						10
23	(India) Dean Mascarenhas					7						Ret	8		10
24	(Poland) Grzegorz Bonder								6	WD					8
25	(Finland) Ville Pynnönen										6				8
26	(Chile) Patricio Muñoz												7		6
27	(Finland) Riku Tahko										8				4
28	(Finland) Ismo Leikola										9				2
29	(Chile) Carlos Prieto												9		2
30	(Japan) Rio Ogata									Ret	10				1
Pos.	Driver	MON (Monaco)	SWE (Sweden)	KEN (Kenya)	CRO (Croatia)	ESP (Spain)	POR (Portugal)	JPN (Japan)	GRE (Greece)	EST (Estonia)	FIN (Finland)	PAR (Paraguay)	CHL (Chile)	ITA (Italy)	Points

Key
Colour	Result
Gold	Winner
Silver	2nd place
Bronze	3rd place
Green	Points finish
Blue	Non-points finish
Blue	Non-classified finish (NC)
Purple	Did not finish (Ret)
Black	Excluded (EX)
Black	Disqualified (DSQ)
White	Did not start (DNS)
White	Cancelled (C)
Blank	Withdrew entry from the event (WD)

=== FIA WRC3 Championship for Co-Drivers ===
Pos.	Co-driver	MON (Monaco)	SWE (Sweden)	KEN (Kenya)	CRO (Croatia)	ESP (Spain)	POR (Portugal)	JPN (Japan)	GRE (Greece)	EST (Estonia)	FIN (Finland)	PAR (Paraguay)	CHL (Chile)	ITA (Italy)	Points
1	(Italy) Alessandro Arnaboldi	2	1		6		1		1		2				117
2	(Spain) Adrián Pérez		4		2	1	4				1		6		99
3	(Poland) Jakub Wróbel		2			2			2	1	3			WD	91
4	(Portugal) Hugo Magalhães		Ret		5	4		2		2					56
5	(France) Kylian Sarmezan	3			Ret	3		1				Ret			55
6	(Argentina) Matias Aranguren		5				3			3		Ret	4		52
7	(Belgium) Maxime Andernack						6					2	10	1	51
8	(Republic of Ireland) Allan Harryman		7	1				Ret	WD				11	2	48
9	(Turkey) Oytun Albayrak		8		1		2								46
10	(Spain) José Murado		3		4	6	5								45
11	(France) Corentin Silvestre		9		3		Ret			6	5		Ret		35
12	(France) Alexis Grenier	1	6												33
13	(Turkey) Bilge Ayan										7		1		31
14	(India) Musa Sherif			3								3	12		30
15	(Argentina) Mario Javier del Riego											1	WD		25
16	(Japan) Tomiya Maekawa						7			7	4				24
17	(Kenya) Deep Patel			2											17
18	(Chile) Sebastián Olguín												2		17
19	(Greece) Konstantinos Stefanis								3						15
20	(Peru) Juan Pedro Cilloniz												3		15
21	(Spain) Javier Martínez						WD		4						12
22	(Spain) Sergio Fernández Guerra			4											12
23	(Argentina) Pablo Olmos									4	11				12
24	(Spain) Benito Sacramento					5									10
25	(Greece) Konstantinos Makris								5						10
26	(Finland) Juho Koski-Lammi									5					10
27	(Chile) Javiera Roman											Ret	5		10
28	(India) Gagan Karumbaiah					7						Ret	8		10
29	(Poland) Kamil Heller								6	WD					8
30	(Finland) Niklas Heino										6				8
31	(Argentina) Miguel Recalt												7		6
32	(Finland) Markus Soininen										8				4
33	(Finland) Tuomo Hannonen										9				2
34	(Argentina) Juan Cruz Varela												9		2
35	(Finland) Mikael Korhonen									Ret	10				1
Pos.	Co-driver	MON (Monaco)	SWE (Sweden)	KEN (Kenya)	CRO (Croatia)	ESP (Spain)	POR (Portugal)	JPN (Japan)	GRE (Greece)	EST (Estonia)	FIN (Finland)	PAR (Paraguay)	CHL (Chile)	ITA (Italy)	Points

Key
Colour	Result
Gold	Winner
Silver	2nd place
Bronze	3rd place
Green	Points finish
Blue	Non-points finish
Blue	Non-classified finish (NC)
Purple	Did not finish (Ret)
Black	Excluded (EX)
Black	Disqualified (DSQ)
White	Did not start (DNS)
White	Cancelled (C)
Blank	Withdrew entry from the event (WD)
