= Patricia Sáiz =

Spanish rally co-driver

Personal information
- Nationality: (Spain) Spanish
- Full name: Patricia Sáiz Ruiloba
- Born: 6 October 1998 (age 28)

World Rally Championship record
- Years active: 2026–present
- Teams: Hyundai Shell Mobis WRT
- Rallies: 1
- Championships: 0
- Rally wins: 0
- Podiums: 0
- Stage wins: 0
- Total points: 0
- First rally: 2026 Rally Italia Sardegna

Patricia Sáiz Ruiloba (born 6 October 1998) is a Spanish rally co-driver.

== Biography ==
Sáiz made her rallying debut in 2020, and started co-driving for Dani Sordo. She made her WRC debut at the 2026 Rally Italia Sardegna, representing Hyundai Shell Mobis WRT alongside Sordo.

== Rally results ==
=== WRC results ===
Year	Entrant	Car	1	2	3	4	5	6	7	8	9	10	11	12	13	14	WDC	Points
2026	Hyundai Shell Mobis WRT	Hyundai i20 N Rally1	MON	SWE	KEN	CRO	ESP	POR	JPN	GRE	EST	FIN	PAR	CHL	ITA	SAU; C	14th	10

- Season still in progress.
