= Rally del Paraguay =

Paraguayan rallying competition

- Genre: Motorsporting event
- Frequency: Annual
- Location: Encarnación
- Country: Paraguay
- Inaugurated: 2024

Rally del Paraguay is a rally competition in Encarnación, Itapúa Department in south-east Paraguay, based on the long existing Rally Trans Itapúa. The rally is set to hold the WRC event from 2025 after signing a multi-year deal, meaning Paraguay would become the thirty-eighth nation to stage a WRC championship round.

== History ==
Conversations have been held between Paraguayan authorities and WRC Promoter before the confirmation in June 2024. The Rally Trans Itapúa has been held annually in March since 1981 and has been chosen as the event to be promoted to the WRC. In 2024 a trial event has been held in September, named 1st Rally del Paraguay, that was the last test before the WRC debut in the following year. Rally Trans Itapúa keeps been running in March as opening round of Paraguayan and CODASUR championships.

== Results ==
Year	Designation	Winner	Car	Team	Tyre	Series	Refs
2024	1° Petrobras Rally del Paraguay	(Bolivia) Marco Bulacia Wilkinson (Spain) Diego Vallejo	Volkswagen Polo GTI R5	(Paraguay) ABR South America by MG Rally Works	M	Paraguayan championship	
2025	2° ueno Rally de Paraguay	(France) Sébastien Ogier (France) Vincent Landais	Toyota GR Yaris Rally1	(Japan) Toyota Gazoo Racing WRT	H	World Rally Championship	
2026	3° ueno Rally de Paraguay	(Finland) Sami Pajari (Finland) Marko Salminen	Toyota GR Yaris Rally1	(Japan) Toyota Gazoo Racing WRT	H	World Rally Championship	
