= 2026 Rally Saudi Arabia =

2nd edition of the Rally Saudi Arabia

2026 Rally Saudi Arabia Rally Saudi Arabia 2026
- Part of the Middle East Rally Championship
- Host country: Saudi Arabia
- Rally base: Jeddah, Mecca Province
- Dates run: 11 – 14 November 2026
- Start location: Jeddah, Mecca Province
- Finish location: Jeddah, Mecca Province
- Stages: 16 (320.34 km; 199.05 miles)
- Stage surface: Gravel

Statistics
- Cancellation: WRC event cancelled due to the 2026 Iran war.

The 2026 Rally Saudi Arabia is a planned motor racing event for rally cars that is scheduled to be held over four days from 11 to 14 November 2026. It would mark the second running of the Rally Saudi Arabia, and was due to be the final round of the 2026 World Rally Championship, 2026 WRC2 Championship and 2026 WRC3 Championship. The event was ultimately removed from the WRC calendar due to concerns raised amidst the 2026 Iran war, but it would remain as a part of the Middle East Rally Championship. The 2026 event is set to be based in Jeddah, Mecca Province, and is set to be consisted of sixteen special stages, covering a total competitive distance of 320.34 km (199.05 mi).

Thierry Neuville and Martijn Wydaeghe were the defending rally winners, and their team, Hyundai Shell Mobis WRT, were the defending manufacturers' winners.

== Background ==
=== Itinerary ===
All dates and times are AST (UTC+3).

Date	No.	Time span	Stage name	Distance
11 November	—	After 11:01	Thabhan [Shakedown]	4.49 km
12 November	SS1	After 8:03	Al Faisaliyah 1	21.58 km
12 November	SS2	After 9:16	Khulays 1	11.14 km
12 November	SS3	After 10:10	Moon Stage 1	19.96 km
12 November		12:15 – 12:45	Service A, Jeddah Corniche Circuit	—N/a
12 November	SS4	After 14:13	Al Faisaliyah 2	21.58 km
12 November	SS5	After 15:26	Khulays 2	11.14 km
12 November	SS6	After 16:20	Moon Stage 2	19.96 km
12 November		18:15 – 19:00	Flexi service B, Jeddah Corniche Circuit	—N/a
13 November	SS7	After 7:50	Bryman 1	13.10 km
13 November	SS8	After 8:45	Wadi Almatwi 1	29.73 km
13 November	SS9	After 10:01	Um Al Jerem 1	29.74 km
13 November		12:04 – 12:34	Service C, Jeddah Corniche Circuit	—N/a
13 November	SS10	After 13:24	Bryman 2	13.10 km
13 November	SS11	After 14:19	Wadi Almatwi 2	29.73 km
13 November	SS12	After 15:35	Um Al Jerem 2	29.74 km
13 November		17:25 – 18:10	Flexi service D, Jeddah Corniche Circuit	—N/a
13 November	SS13	After 20:05	Jameel Motorsport Stage	2.00 km
14 November		7:51 – 8:06	Service E, Jeddah Corniche Circuit	—N/a
14 November	SS14	After 9:19	Asfan	35.00 km
14 November	SS15	After 11:05	Thabhan 1	16.42 km
14 November		13:24 – 13:54	Service F, Jeddah Corniche Circuit	—N/a
14 November	SS16	After 14:15	Thabhan 2 [Power Stage]	16.42 km

=== Removal from the World Rally Championship ===
The event was set to hold the season finale of the 2026 World Rally Championship, but it was removed from the calendar due to concerns over the 2026 Iran war. However, the event would remain on the Middle East Rally Championship calendar.

Previous rally: N/A	2026 FIA World Rally Championship	Next rally: N/A
Previous rally: 2025 Rally Saudi Arabia	Rally Saudi Arabia	Next rally: 2027 Rally Saudi Arabia
