= 2026 World Rally Championship =

54th running of the World Rally Championship

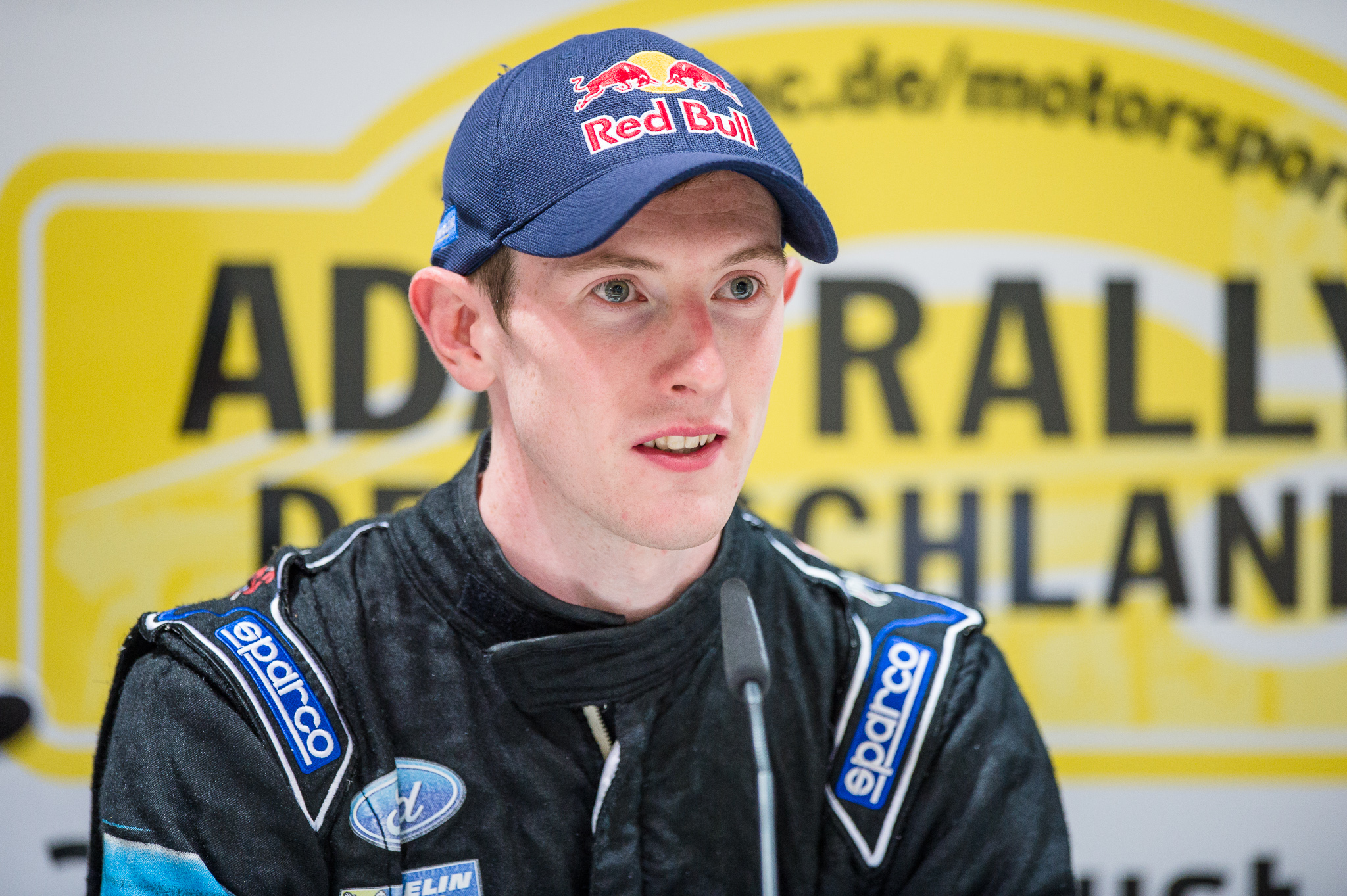
Elfyn Evans won his first drivers' championship title.

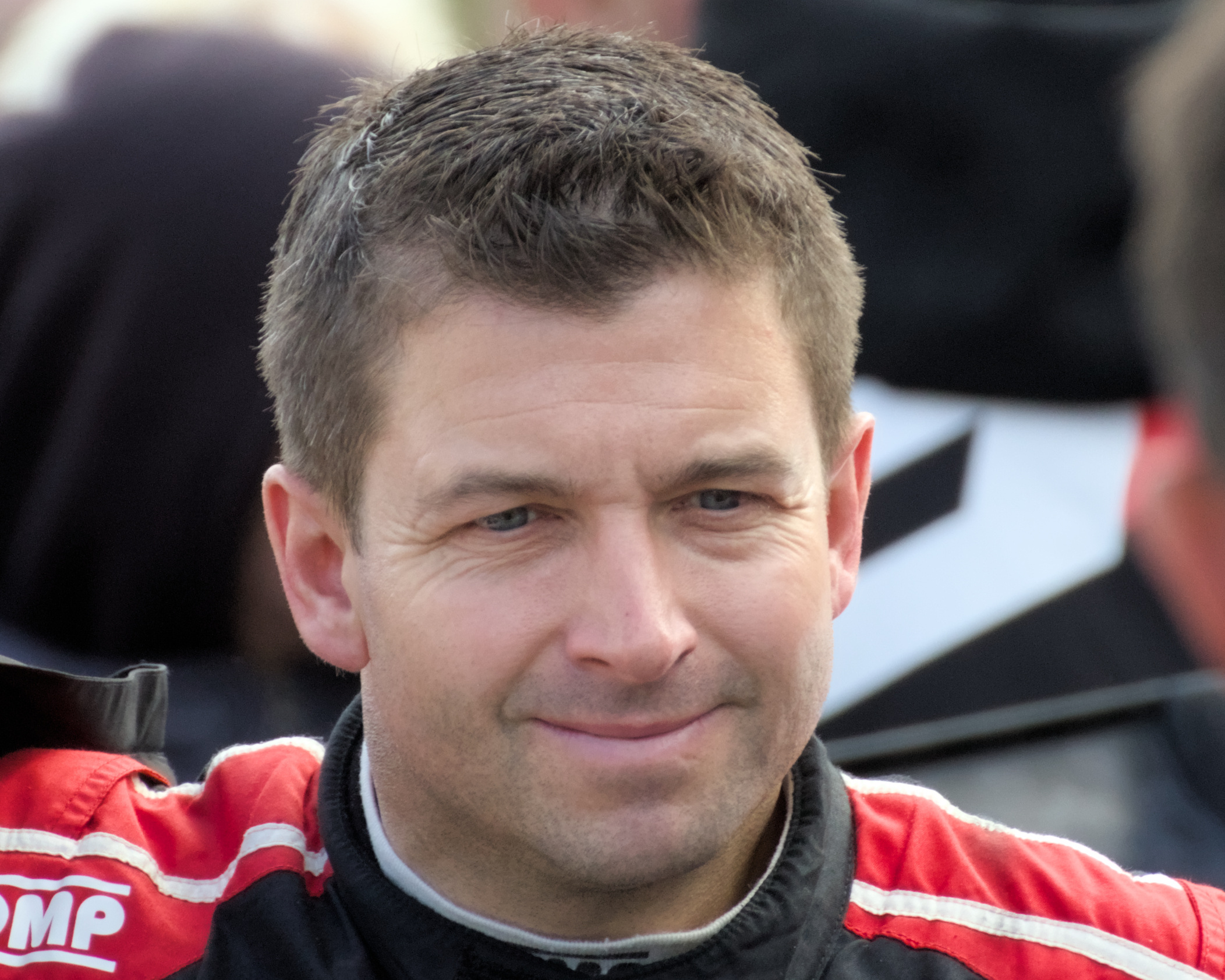
Scott Martin won his first co-drivers' championship title.

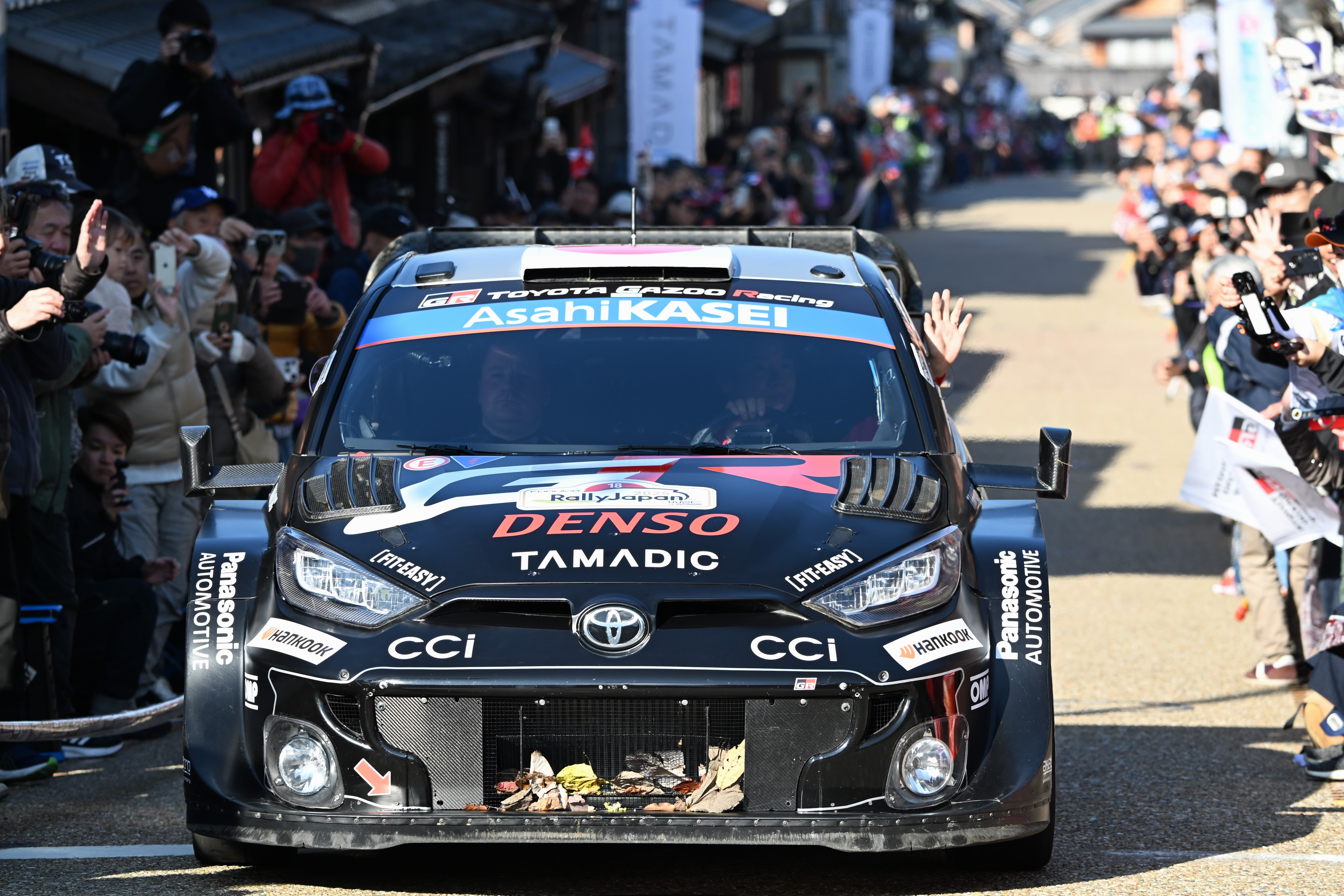
Toyota Gazoo Racing WRT (GR Yaris Rally1 pictured) are the manufacturers' champions.

The 2026 FIA World Rally Championship was the 54th season of the World Rally Championship, an international rallying series organised by the Fédération Internationale de l'Automobile (FIA) and WRC Promoter GmbH. Teams and crews competed for the World Rally Championships for Drivers, Co-drivers and Manufacturers. Crews were free to compete in cars complying with Groups Rally1 to Rally5 regulations; however, only manufacturers competing with Rally1 cars were eligible to score points in the manufacturers' championship. The championship began in January 2026 with the Monte Carlo Rally and was set to conclude in November 2026 with the Rally Saudi Arabia, until the event was removed due to the 2026 Iran war. The Rally Italia Sardegna subsequently became the season finale. The series was supported by the WRC2 and WRC3 categories at every round of the championship and by Junior WRC at selected events.

Sébastien Ogier and Vincent Landais were the reigning drivers' and co-drivers' champions, having secured the 2025 championship at the 2025 Rally Saudi Arabia. Toyota were the defending manufacturers' champions.

At the conclusion of the championship, Elfyn Evans and Scott Martin won their first World Rally Championship titles at the 2026 Rally Italia Sardegna. Oliver Solberg and Elliott Edmondson were second, trailing by five points. Sami Pajari and Marko Salminen were third, a further one point behind. In the manufacturers' championship, Toyota Gazoo Racing WRT has successfully defended their title, holding a 222-point advantage over Hyundai Shell Mobis WRT.

== Calendar ==
The 2026 season was scheduled to be contested over fourteen rounds across Europe, Africa, South America and Asia, but it was ultimately reduced to thirteen rounds.

Round	Start date	Finish date	Rally	Rally headquarters	Surface	Stages	Distance	Ref.
1	22 January	25 January	(Monaco) Rallye Automobile Monte Carlo	Gap, Provence-Alpes-Côte d'Azur, France	Mixed (Note: The Monte Carlo Rally was run on a tarmac and snow surface.)	17	339.15 km	
2	12 February	15 February	Rally Sweden	Umeå, Västerbotten County, Sweden	Snow	18	300.66 km	
3	12 March	15 March	Safari Rally Kenya	Nairobi, Nakuru County, Kenya	Gravel	20	350.52 km	
4	9 April	12 April	Croatia Rally	Rijeka, Primorje-Gorski Kotar County, Croatia	Tarmac	20	300.28 km	
5	23 April	26 April	(Spain) Rally Islas Canarias	Las Palmas, Gran Canaria, Spain	Tarmac	18	322.04 km	
6	7 May	10 May	Rally de Portugal	Matosinhos, Porto, Portugal	Gravel	23	344.91 km	
7	28 May	31 May	Rally Japan	Toyota, Aichi, Japan	Tarmac	20	302.82 km	
8	25 June	28 June	Acropolis Rally Greece	Loutraki, Corinthia, Greece	Gravel	17	323.31 km	
9	16 July	19 July	Rally Estonia	Tartu, Estonia	Gravel	18	301.80 km	
10	30 July	2 August	Rally Finland	Jyväskylä, Central Finland, Finland	Gravel	20	316.60 km	
11	27 August	30 August	Rally del Paraguay	Encarnación, Itapúa, Paraguay	Gravel	22	358.88 km	
12	10 September	13 September	Rally Chile	Talcahuano, Biobío, Chile	Gravel	16	311.70 km	
13	1 October	4 October	(Italy) Rally Italia Sardegna	Alghero, Sardinia, Italy	Gravel	17	306.92 km	

The 2026 Rally Saudi Arabia was included on the original calendar published by WRC Promoter GmbH and was scheduled to be the fourteenth round of the championship, but was later removed from the season:

Start date	Finish date	Rally	Rally headquarters	Surface	Stages	Distance	Removal reason	Ref.
11 November	14 November	Rally Saudi Arabia	Jeddah, Mecca Province, Saudi Arabia	Gravel	16	320.34 km	2026 Iran war	

A map showing the locations of the rallies in the 2026 championship. Event headquarters were marked with black dots. Removed event was marked with a red dot.

=== Calendar changes ===
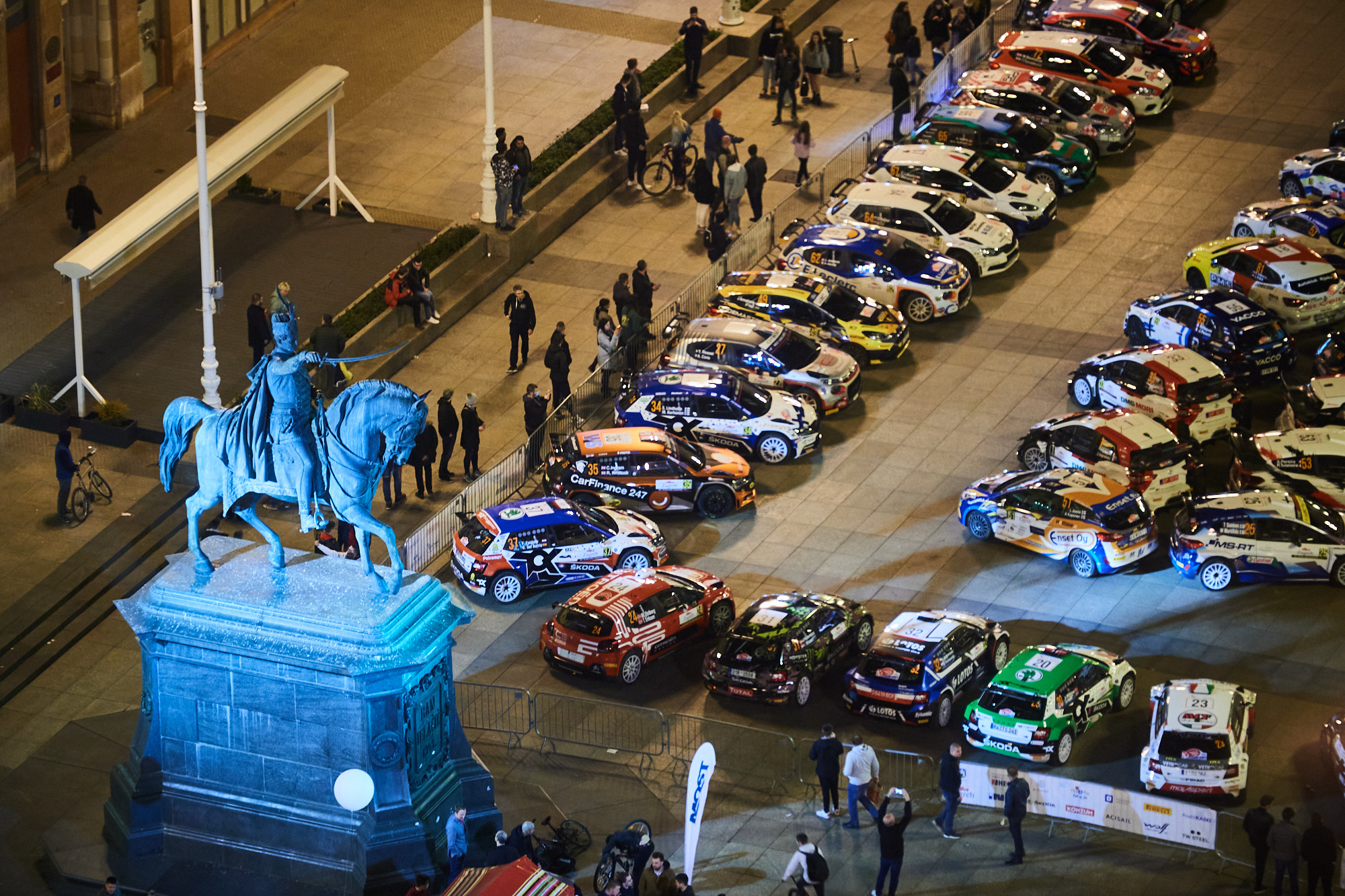
The Croatia Rally returned to the championship after being held as a European Rally Championship event in 2025.

- The Croatia Rally returned to the championship after missing the 2025 season, replacing the Central European Rally. The rally featured new headquarters in Rijeka, instead of Zagreb and a brand new set of mixed tarmac stages.
- The Italian Rally and Rally Japan swapped calendar slots, and the new Rally di Roma Capitale was confirmed to replace the Rally Italia Sardegna from 2027 onwards.
- The organisers of the Acropolis Rally announced a change of its headquarters, with Loutraki serving as the new base after five years in Lamia.
- The Rally Saudi Arabia was set to hold the season finale, but it was removed from the calendar in September due to the 2026 Iran war. An all-gravel round in Catalonia, Spain was reportedly mooted as a replacement, however this did not materialise as the deadline for its confirmation was not met.

== Entrants ==
The following manufacturers contested the championship under Rally1 regulations. All crews used tyres provided by Hankook.

Rally1 entries eligible to score manufacturer points
Manufacturer	Entrant	Car	No.	Driver name	Co-driver name	Rounds
Ford	(United Kingdom) M-Sport Ford WRT	Ford Puma Rally1	55	(Republic of Ireland) Josh McErlean	(Republic of Ireland) Eoin Treacy	All
Ford	(United Kingdom) M-Sport Ford WRT	Ford Puma Rally1	95	(Republic of Ireland) Jon Armstrong	(Republic of Ireland) Shane Byrne	All
Hyundai	(South Korea) Hyundai Shell Mobis WRT	Hyundai i20 N Rally1	4	(Finland) Esapekka Lappi	(Finland) Enni Mälkönen	2–3, 9–10, 12
Hyundai	(South Korea) Hyundai Shell Mobis WRT	Hyundai i20 N Rally1	6	(Spain) Dani Sordo	(Spain) Cándido Carrera	5–6, 8
Hyundai	(South Korea) Hyundai Shell Mobis WRT	Hyundai i20 N Rally1	6	(Spain) Dani Sordo	(Spain) Patricia Sáiz	13
Hyundai	(South Korea) Hyundai Shell Mobis WRT	Hyundai i20 N Rally1	11	(Belgium) Thierry Neuville	(Belgium) Martijn Wydaeghe	All
Hyundai	(South Korea) Hyundai Shell Mobis WRT	Hyundai i20 N Rally1	16	(France) Adrien Fourmaux	(France) Alexandre Coria	All
Hyundai	(South Korea) Hyundai Shell Mobis WRT	Hyundai i20 N Rally1	20	(New Zealand) Hayden Paddon	(New Zealand) John Kennard	1, 4, 7, 11
Toyota	(Japan) Toyota Gazoo Racing WRT	Toyota GR Yaris Rally1	1	(France) Sébastien Ogier	(France) Vincent Landais	1, 3, 5–9, 11–13
Toyota	(Japan) Toyota Gazoo Racing WRT	Toyota GR Yaris Rally1	1	(France) Sébastien Ogier	(France) Julien Ingrassia	10
Toyota	(Japan) Toyota Gazoo Racing WRT	Toyota GR Yaris Rally1	18	(Japan) Takamoto Katsuta	(Republic of Ireland) Aaron Johnston	2, 4
Toyota	(Japan) Toyota Gazoo Racing WRT	Toyota GR Yaris Rally1	33	(United Kingdom) Elfyn Evans	(United Kingdom) Scott Martin	1–12
Toyota	(Japan) Toyota Gazoo Racing WRT	Toyota GR Yaris Rally1	99	(Sweden) Oliver Solberg	(United Kingdom) Elliott Edmondson	All
Toyota	(Japan) Toyota Gazoo Racing WRT2	Toyota GR Yaris Rally1	5	(Finland) Sami Pajari	(Finland) Marko Salminen	All

The following crews entered in Rally1 cars as privateers or under arrangement with the manufacturers.

Rally1 entries ineligible to score manufacturer points
Manufacturer	Entrant	Car	No.	Driver name	Co-driver name	Rounds
Ford	(United Kingdom) M-Sport Ford WRT	Ford Puma Rally1	9	(Greece) Jourdan Serderidis	(Belgium) Frédéric Miclotte	8
Ford	(United Kingdom) M-Sport Ford WRT	Ford Puma Rally1	13	(Luxembourg) Grégoire Munster	(Belgium) Louis Louka	1
Ford	(United Kingdom) M-Sport Ford WRT	Ford Puma Rally1	22	(Latvia) Mārtiņš Sesks	(Latvia) Renārs Francis	2, 6, 8–10, 13
Toyota	(Japan) Toyota Gazoo Racing WRT	Toyota GR Yaris Rally1	18	(Japan) Takamoto Katsuta	(Republic of Ireland) Aaron Johnston	1, 3, 5–11, 13
Toyota	(Japan) Toyota Gazoo Racing WRT	Toyota GR Yaris Rally1	18	(Japan) Takamoto Katsuta	(Republic of Ireland) James Fulton	12
Toyota	(Japan) Toyota Gazoo Racing WRT	Toyota GR Yaris Rally1	33	(United Kingdom) Elfyn Evans	(United Kingdom) Scott Martin	13
Toyota	(Japan) Toyota Gazoo Racing WRT	Toyota GR Yaris Rally1	37	(Italy) Lorenzo Bertelli	(Italy) Simone Scattolin	2

=== In detail ===
M-Sport kept the crew of Josh McErlean and Eoin Treacy. Jon Armstrong and Shane Byrne stepped up from the European Rally Championship to complete a full Motorsport Ireland Rally Academy lineup for the team, replacing Grégoire Munster and Louis Louka in the second full-time seat. Munster was later confirmed to contest the season opener in a third Rally1 car with the team. Mārtiņš Sesks continued to run a partial program with the team, contesting seven events during the season.

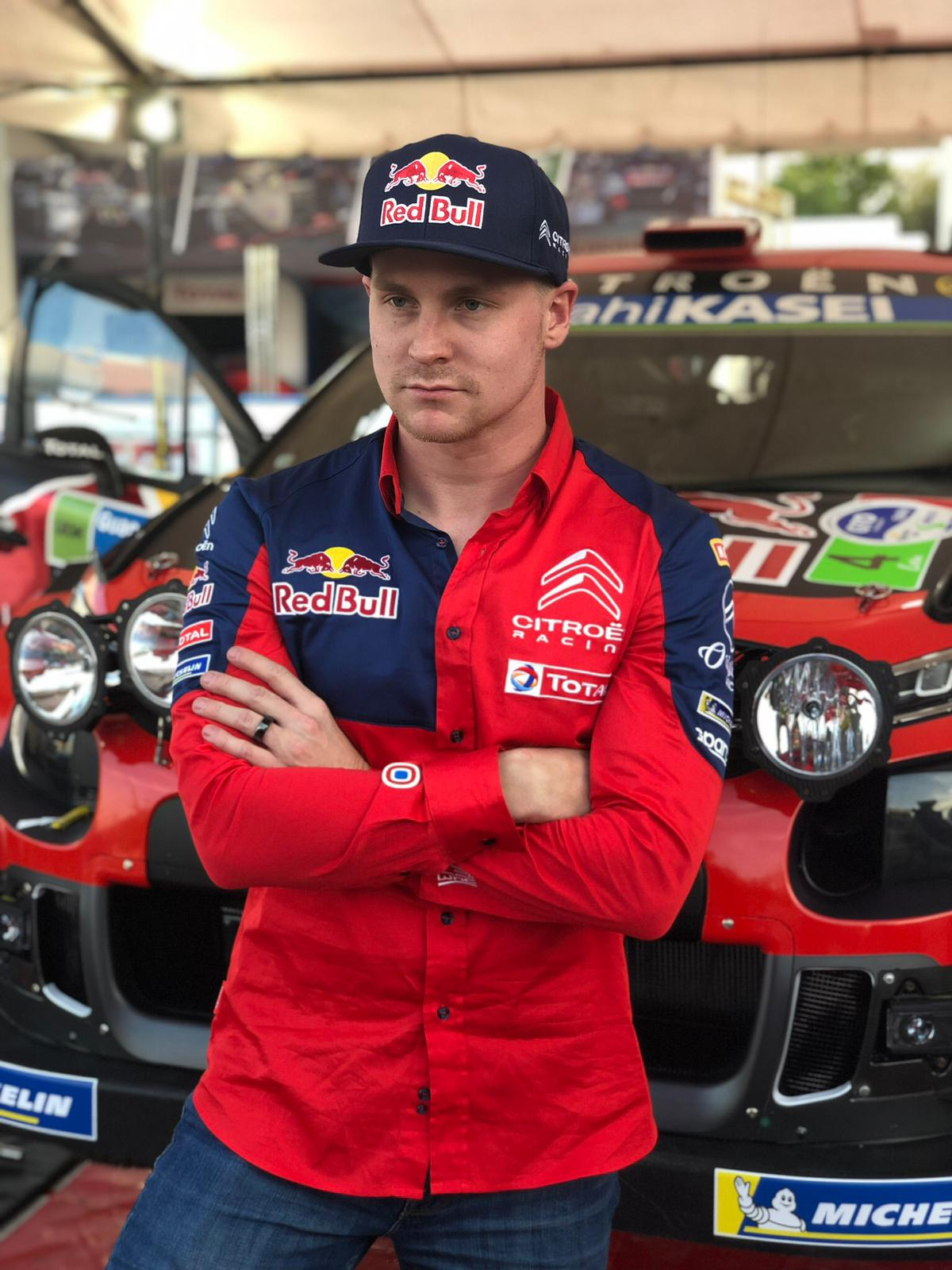
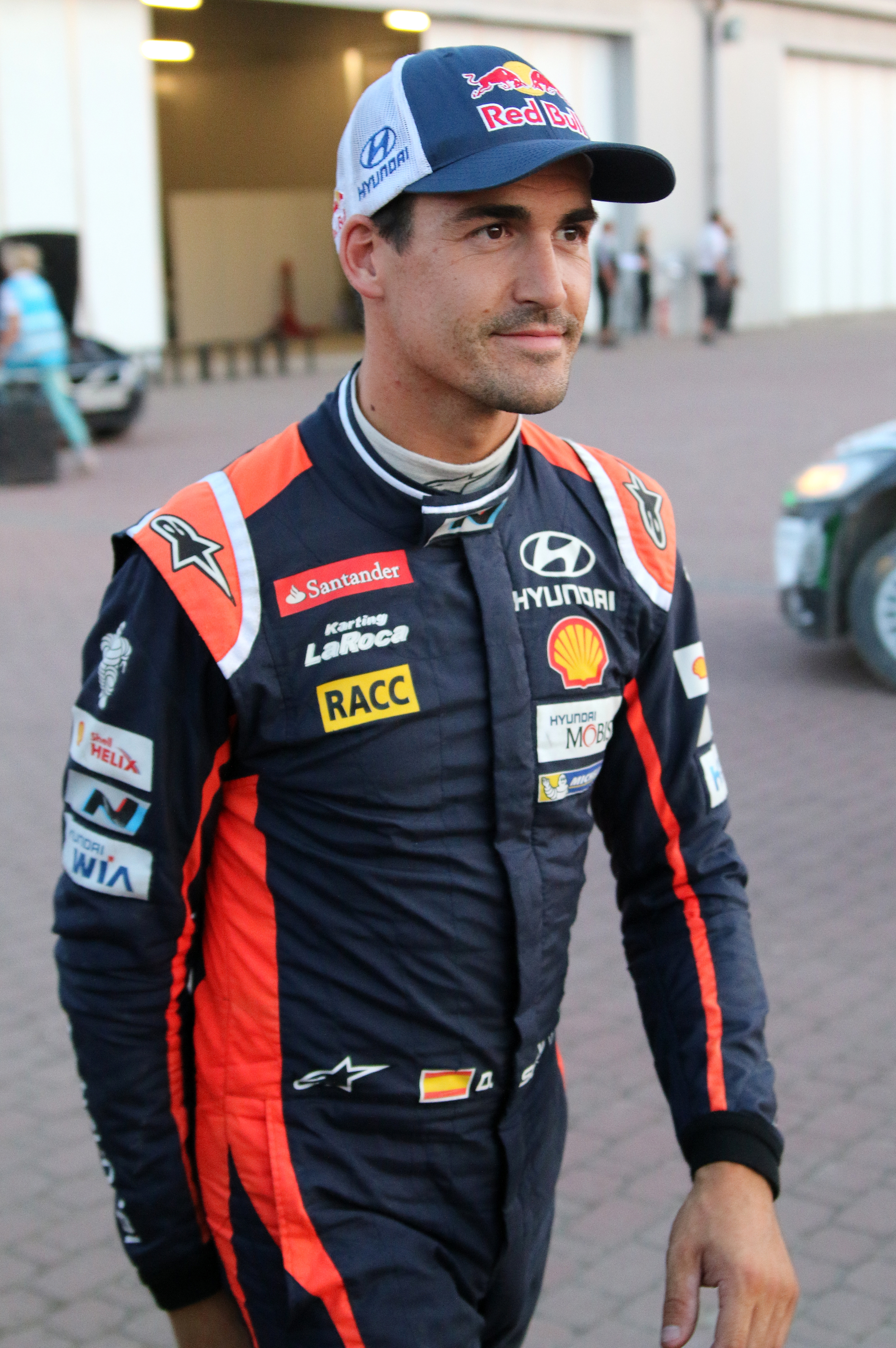
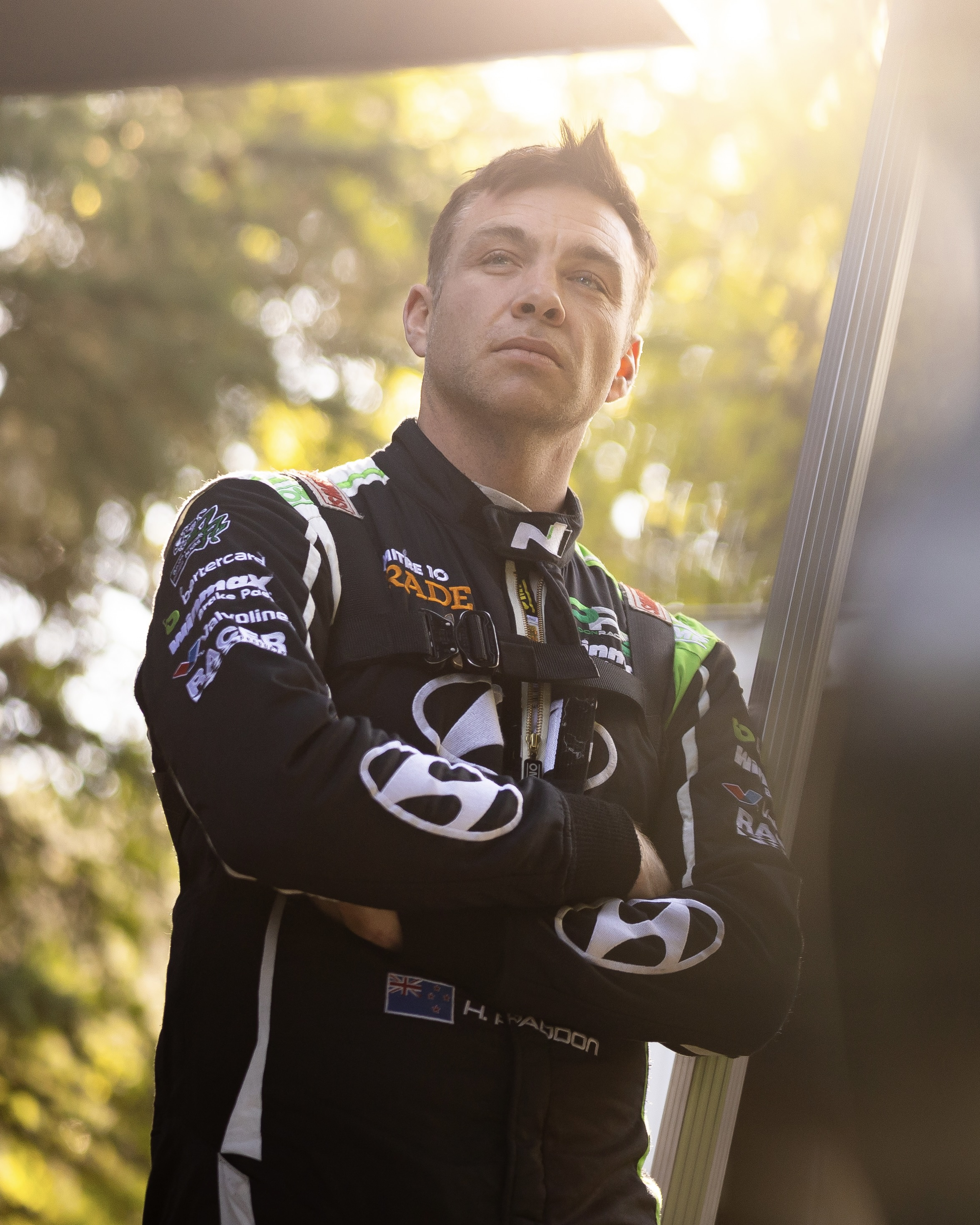
Esapekka Lappi (left), Dani Sordo (middle) and Hayden Paddon (right) returned to the top tier for part-time campaigns.

Hyundai maintained the services of Thierry Neuville and Martijn Wydaeghe, and of Adrien Fourmaux and Alexandre Coria for entry in all rallies. A third car was shared by crews led by drivers Esapekka Lappi, Dani Sordo and Hayden Paddon. Paddon made his first appearance in the premium level of the championship since the 2018 Rally Australia. Lappi and Sordo also returned after their previous partial campaigns with the team in 2024. Ott Tänak announced his indefinite break from the championship following the end of the 2025 season. Co-driver Patricia Sáiz made her WRC debut at the 2026 Rally Italia Sardegna, partnering with Sordo.

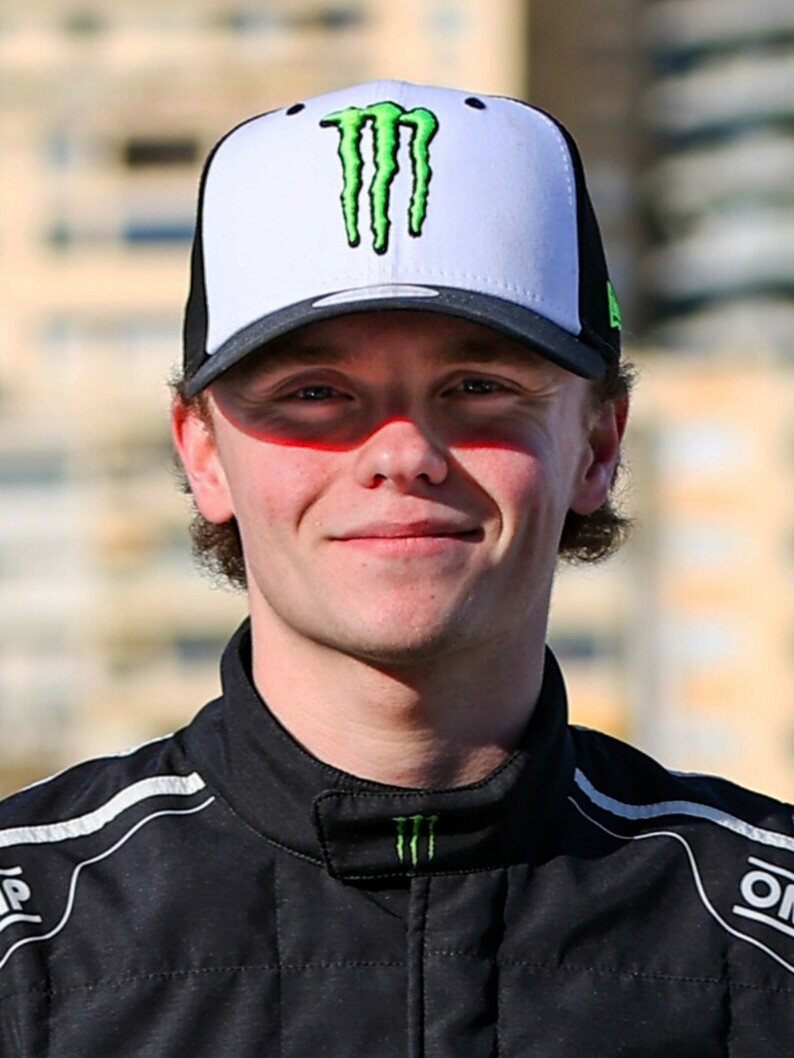
Oliver Solberg returned to the top tier for his first full-time campaign.

Toyota retained Elfyn Evans and Scott Martin as their full-time competitor, while Sami Pajari and Marko Salminen, as well as Takamoto Katsuta and Aaron Johnston were also retained. James Fulton stepped in alongside Katsuta at the 2026 Rally Chile as Johnston spent additional time recovering from the crash at the 2026 Rally del Paraguay. Sébastien Ogier and Vincent Landais continued to run a partial program to contest ten rallies with the team. Julien Ingrassia, Ogier's former co-driver, substituted Landais, who withdrew from the 2026 Rally Finland due to personal reasons. Kalle Rovanperä announced that he would leave the championship to pursue a career in open-wheel racing, having signed a contract with Toyota Gazoo Racing to compete in the Super Formula Championship. However, he did not rule out a return to rallying in the future. His seat at Toyota was filled by Oliver Solberg, who ran his first full-time season in the class, having previously run on a part-time basis for Hyundai in 2022.

== Regulation changes ==
Following the wide criticism of lengthy itinerary, a minimum of 10 rest hours was introduced into every rally weekends. Engines were also allowed to change after the start of a rally, but in doing so, crews would incur a 60-minute time penalty.

== Season report ==
=== Opening rounds ===
The season opener took place in difficult weather conditions, which affected several crews, including both M-Sport crews of McErlean and Treacy and of Armstrong and Byrne, ending M-Sport's 24-year run of point-scoring finishes. The rally was won by Solberg and Edmondson in their first event of their first full-time season in the top tier. Toyota continued its dominance in the following round, securing a 1–2–3–4 finish, with Evans and Martin winning the event.

The Safari Rally was difficult, and all three Toyota crews nominated to score points retired on Saturday. Despite running outside the top five after the first leg, Katsuta and Johnston took their maiden career victory. A similar situation occurred in Croatia, as both championship contenders Solberg and Evans exited early. Benefiting from avoiding punctures, Neuville and Wydaeghe took the lead, a position they held until the final Power Stage, where they retired after crashing off-road. Katsuta and Johnston inherited the win and led the championship for the first time in their careers. Paddon returned to the podium for the first time since the 2018 Rally Australia by finishing third.

=== Mid-season events ===
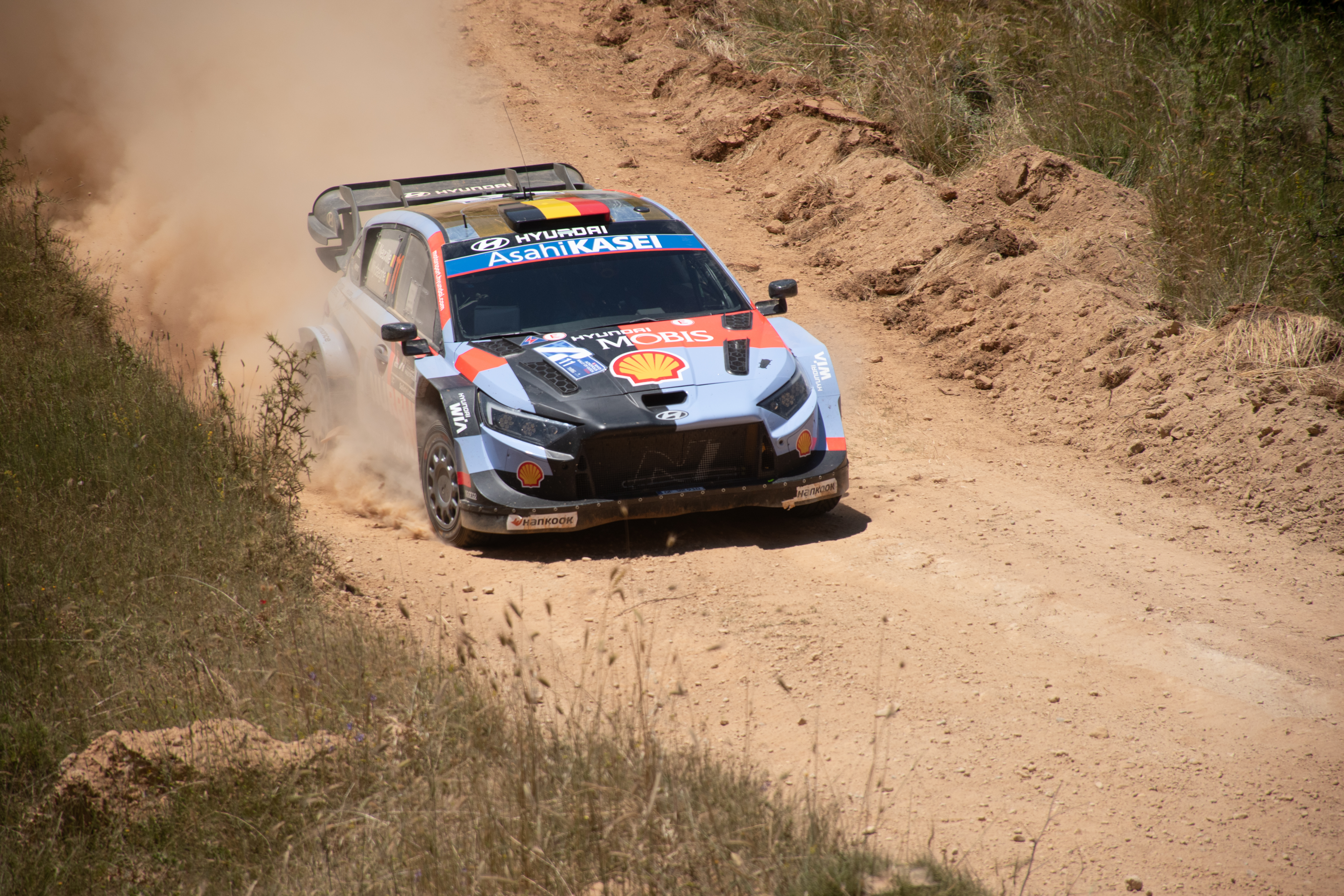
Thierry Neuville and Martijn Wydaeghe were leading the 2026 Acropolis Rally, until double punctures denied their chances of victory.

Toyota dominated the rally of Spain, with Ogier and Landais winning the event. Title contenders Solberg and Edmondson retired on the penultimate stage while in second place after crashing into the barrier. Ogier and Landais had been on course for a second consecutive victory at the Rally de Portugal until a puncture on the penultimate stage denied them the win. Neuville and Wydaeghe became the new rally leaders and won the event, Hyundai's first and only win of the season. Back on tarmac in Japan, Toyota dominated again, winning all twenty stages, with Evans and Martin taking their second victory of the season to extend their championship leads. Ogier and Landais won the Acropolis Rally after a battle with Neuville and Wydaeghe, who were affected by double punctures on the penultimate stage.

The Estonian Rally featured a dominant performance by Pajari and Salminen, who took their first victory after leading from start to finish. They secured back-to-back wins at their home event after rally leader Ogier retired on Saturday evening following a major crash. Evans and Martin secured a podium finish to extend their championship leads to thirty points, despite also rolling on Saturday. Pajari and Salminen completed a historic hat trick at the Rally del Paraguay, becoming the first crew to take their first three top-flight wins at consecutive rallies.

=== Closing rounds ===
Solberg and Edmondson won their second rally of the season in Chile, but the main story of the event was Toyota's sixth consecutive manufacturers' title, tying Lancia with ten world titles. Following the removal of the Rally Saudi Arabia, Evans and Martin entered the final round of the season as championship leaders. However, a puncture and Solberg and Edmondson leading the event meant the lead was reduced to only one point going into the final Power Stage. Whoever finished ahead would be crowned champions. Solberg and Edmondson performed well and were up on Evans and Martin until the very last sector, where they went off the road in their Yaris. Although they recovered and secured the rally victory, they ultimately lost the stage and therefore the world titles to Evans and Martin. Evans became the first British WRC drivers' champion since Richard Burns in 2001.

== Results and standings ==
=== Season summary ===
Round	Event	Winning driver	Winning co-driver	Winning entrant	Winning time	Report	Ref.
1	(Monaco) Rallye Automobile Monte Carlo	(Sweden) Oliver Solberg	(United Kingdom) Elliott Edmondson	(Japan) Toyota Gazoo Racing WRT	4:24:59.0	Report	
2	Rally Sweden	(United Kingdom) Elfyn Evans	(United Kingdom) Scott Martin	(Japan) Toyota Gazoo Racing WRT	2:35:53.1	Report	
3	Safari Rally Kenya	(Japan) Takamoto Katsuta	(Republic of Ireland) Aaron Johnston	(Japan) Toyota Gazoo Racing WRT	3:16:05.6	Report	
4	Croatia Rally	(Japan) Takamoto Katsuta	(Republic of Ireland) Aaron Johnston	(Japan) Toyota Gazoo Racing WRT	2:51:15.8	Report	
5	(Spain) Rally Islas Canarias	(France) Sébastien Ogier	(France) Vincent Landais	(Japan) Toyota Gazoo Racing WRT	2:43:18.9	Report	
6	Rally de Portugal	(Belgium) Thierry Neuville	(Belgium) Martijn Wydaeghe	(South Korea) Hyundai Shell Mobis WRT	3:53:01.7	Report	
7	Rally Japan	(United Kingdom) Elfyn Evans	(United Kingdom) Scott Martin	(Japan) Toyota Gazoo Racing WRT	3:17:08.0	Report	
8	Acropolis Rally Greece	(France) Sébastien Ogier	(France) Vincent Landais	(Japan) Toyota Gazoo Racing WRT	3:36:40.7	Report	
9	Rally Estonia	(Finland) Sami Pajari	(Finland) Marko Salminen	(Japan) Toyota Gazoo Racing WRT2	2:31:16.5	Report	
10	Rally Finland	(Finland) Sami Pajari	(Finland) Marko Salminen	(Japan) Toyota Gazoo Racing WRT2	2:27:58.0	Report	
11	Rally del Paraguay	(Finland) Sami Pajari	(Finland) Marko Salminen	(Japan) Toyota Gazoo Racing WRT2	3:13:28.5	Report	
12	Rally Chile	(Sweden) Oliver Solberg	(United Kingdom) Elliott Edmondson	(Japan) Toyota Gazoo Racing WRT	2:57:08.2	Report	
13	(Italy) Rally Italia Sardegna	(Sweden) Oliver Solberg	(United Kingdom) Elliott Edmondson	(Japan) Toyota Gazoo Racing WRT	3:24:57.0	Report	
–	Rally Saudi Arabia	Rally removed (due to the 2026 Iran war)				Report	

=== Scoring system ===
Points were awarded to the top ten classified finishers in each event. In the manufacturers' championship, teams were eligible to nominate three crews to score points, but these points were only awarded to the top two classified finishers representing a manufacturer and driving a 2026-specification Rally1 car. There were also five bonus points awarded to the winners in an accumulated standings across all Sunday stages, four points for second place, three for third, two for fourth and one for fifth. The same points scale was awarded to the five fastest crews of the Power Stage as well.

Position	1st	2nd	3rd	4th	5th	6th	7th	8th	9th	10th
Overall	25	17	15	12	10	8	6	4	2	1
Sunday	5	4	3	2	1	—N/a				
Power Stage	5	4	3	2	1	—N/a				

=== FIA World Rally Championship for Drivers ===
The driver who recorded a points-scoring classification was taken into account for the championship regardless of the categories.

Pos.	Driver	MON (Monaco)	SWE (Sweden)	KEN (Kenya)	CRO (Croatia)	ESP (Spain)	POR (Portugal)	JPN (Japan)	GRE (Greece)	EST (Estonia)	FIN (Finland)	PAR (Paraguay)	CHL (Chile)	ITA (Italy)	Points
1	(United Kingdom) Elfyn Evans														243
2	(Sweden) Oliver Solberg														238
3	(Finland) Sami Pajari														237
4	(France) Sébastien Ogier														189
5	(France) Adrien Fourmaux														183
6	(Japan) Takamoto Katsuta														175
7	(Belgium) Thierry Neuville														134
8	(New Zealand) Hayden Paddon														38
9	(Republic of Ireland) Josh McErlean														35
10	(Finland) Esapekka Lappi														33
11	(France) Yohan Rossel														24
12	(Republic of Ireland) Jon Armstrong														22
13	(Estonia) Robert Virves														19
14	(France) Léo Rossel														18
15	(United Kingdom) Gus Greensmith														14
16	(Latvia) Mārtiņš Sesks														12
17	(Bulgaria) Nikolay Gryazin														10
18	(Spain) Dani Sordo														10
19	(Finland) Roope Korhonen														9
20	(Paraguay) Diego Domínguez Jr.														8
21	(Spain) Alejandro Cachón														7
22	(Paraguay) Fabrizio Zaldivar														6
23	(Italy) Roberto Daprà														6
24	(Norway) Andreas Mikkelsen														5
25	(Finland) Jari-Matti Latvala														4
26	(France) Arthur Pelamourgues														2
27	(Paraguay) Alejandro Galanti														2
28	(Finland) Teemu Suninen														2
29	(Italy) Matteo Fontana														2
30	(Australia) Taylor Gill														1
31	(France) Eric Camilli														1
32	(Finland) Emil Lindholm														1
Pos.	Driver	MON (Monaco)	SWE (Sweden)	KEN (Kenya)	CRO (Croatia)	ESP (Spain)	POR (Portugal)	JPN (Japan)	GRE (Greece)	EST (Estonia)	FIN (Finland)	PAR (Paraguay)	CHL (Chile)	ITA (Italy)	Points

Key
Colour	Result
Gold	Winner
Silver	2nd place
Bronze	3rd place
Green	Top 10 finish
Blue	Non-top 10 finish
Blue	Non-classified finish (NC)
Purple	Did not finish (Ret)
Black	Excluded (EX)
Black	Disqualified (DSQ)
White	Did not start (DNS)
White	Cancelled (C)
Blank	Withdrew entry from the event (WD)

Notes:
Main script – Final position
Text below – Points scored from overall, Sunday and the Power Stage

=== FIA World Rally Championship for Co-Drivers ===
The co-driver who recorded a points-scoring classification was taken into account for the championship regardless of the categories.

Pos.	Co-driver	MON (Monaco)	SWE (Sweden)	KEN (Kenya)	CRO (Croatia)	ESP (Spain)	POR (Portugal)	JPN (Japan)	GRE (Greece)	EST (Estonia)	FIN (Finland)	PAR (Paraguay)	CHL (Chile)	ITA (Italy)	Points
1	(United Kingdom) Scott Martin														243
2	(United Kingdom) Elliott Edmondson														238
3	(Finland) Marko Salminen														237
4	(France) Vincent Landais														189
5	(France) Alexandre Coria														183
6	(Republic of Ireland) Aaron Johnston														172
7	(Belgium) Martijn Wydaeghe														134
8	(New Zealand) John Kennard														38
9	(Republic of Ireland) Eoin Treacy														35
10	(Finland) Enni Mälkönen														33
11	(France) Arnaud Dunand														24
12	(Republic of Ireland) Shane Byrne														22
13	(Estonia) Jakko Viilo														19
14	(France) Guillaume Mercoiret														18
15	(Sweden) Jonas Andersson														14
16	(Latvia) Renārs Francis														12
17	(Kyrgyzstan) Konstantin Aleksandrov														10
18	(Spain) Cándido Carrera														10
19	(Finland) Anssi Viinikka														9
20	(Spain) Rogelio Peñate														8
21	(Spain) Borja Rozada														7
22	(Italy) Marcelo Der Ohannesian														6
23	(Italy) Luca Guglielmetti														6
24	(Norway) Jørn Listerud														5
25	(Finland) Juho Hänninen														4
26	(Republic of Ireland) James Fulton														3
27	(France) Bastien Pouget														2
28	(Argentina) Marcelo Toyotoshi														2
29	(Finland) Janni Hussi														2
30	(Italy) Alessandro Arnaboldi														2
31	(Australia) Daniel Brkic														1
32	(France) Thibault de la Haye														1
33	(Brazil) Gabriel Morales														1
Pos.	Co-driver	MON (Monaco)	SWE (Sweden)	KEN (Kenya)	CRO (Croatia)	ESP (Spain)	POR (Portugal)	JPN (Japan)	GRE (Greece)	EST (Estonia)	FIN (Finland)	PAR (Paraguay)	CHL (Chile)	ITA (Italy)	Points

Key
Colour	Result
Gold	Winner
Silver	2nd place
Bronze	3rd place
Green	Top 10 finish
Blue	Non-top 10 finish
Blue	Non-classified finish (NC)
Purple	Did not finish (Ret)
Black	Excluded (EX)
Black	Disqualified (DSQ)
White	Did not start (DNS)
White	Cancelled (C)
Blank	Withdrew entry from the event (WD)

Notes:
Main script – Final position
Text below – Points scored from overall, Sunday and the Power Stage

=== FIA World Rally Championship for Manufacturers ===
Only the best two results of each manufacturer in the respective overall classification by the end of each rally, accumulated position of all Sunday stages and Power Stage at each rally were taken into account for the championship.

Pos.	Manufacturer	MON (Monaco)	SWE (Sweden)	KEN (Kenya)	CRO (Croatia)	ESP (Spain)	POR (Portugal)	JPN (Japan)	GRE (Greece)	EST (Estonia)	FIN (Finland)	PAR (Paraguay)	CHL (Chile)	ITA (Italy)	Points
1	(Japan) Toyota Gazoo Racing WRT														662
2	(South Korea) Hyundai Shell Mobis WRT														440
3	(Japan) Toyota Gazoo Racing WRT2														251
4	(United Kingdom) M-Sport Ford WRT														168
Pos.	Manufacturer	MON (Monaco)	SWE (Sweden)	KEN (Kenya)	CRO (Croatia)	ESP (Spain)	POR (Portugal)	JPN (Japan)	GRE (Greece)	EST (Estonia)	FIN (Finland)	PAR (Paraguay)	CHL (Chile)	ITA (Italy)	Points

Key
Colour	Result
Gold	Winner
Silver	2nd place
Bronze	3rd place
Green	Top 10 finish
Blue	Non-top 10 finish
Blue	Non-classified finish (NC)
Purple	Did not finish (Ret)
Black	Excluded (EX)
Black	Disqualified (DSQ)
White	Did not start (DNS)
White	Cancelled (C)
Blank	Withdrew entry from the event (WD)

Notes:
Main script – Final position
Text below – Points scored from overall, Sunday and the Power Stage
