= 2026 Rally Sweden =

73rd edition of the Rally Sweden

2026 Rally Sweden Swedish Rally 2026
Round 2 of 13 in the 2026 World Rally Championship
← Previous event	Next event →
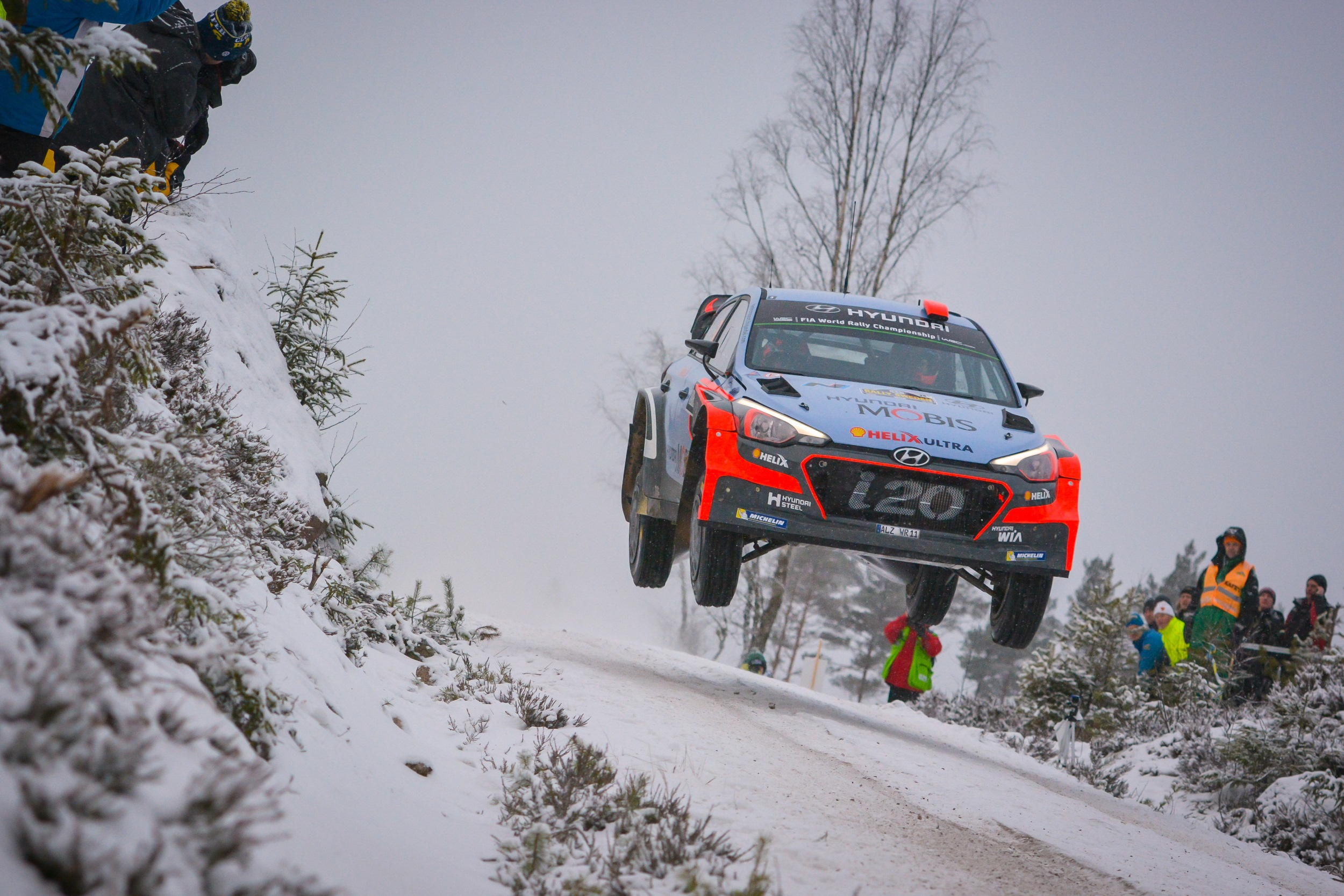
- Rally Sweden is the only snow event on the World Rally Championship calendar.
- Host country: Sweden
- Rally base: Umeå, Västerbotten County
- Dates run: 12 – 15 February 2026
- Start location: Umeå, Västerbotten County
- Finish location: Umeå, Västerbotten County
- Stages: 18 (300.66 km; 186.82 miles)
- Stage surface: Snow
- Transport distance: 768.78 km (477.70 miles)
- Overall distance: 1,069.44 km (664.52 miles)

Statistics
- Crews registered: 59
- Crews: 55 at start, 48 at finish

Overall results
- Overall winner: (United Kingdom) Elfyn Evans (United Kingdom) Scott Martin (Japan) Toyota Gazoo Racing WRT; 2:35:53.1
- Sunday Accumulated leader: (United Kingdom) Elfyn Evans (United Kingdom) Scott Martin (Japan) Toyota Gazoo Racing WRT; 30:38.5
- Power Stage winner: (Belgium) Thierry Neuville (Belgium) Martijn Wydaeghe (South Korea) Hyundai Shell Mobis WRT; 5:56.0

Support category results
- WRC-2 winner: (Finland) Roope Korhonen (Finland) Anssi Viinikka (Finland) Rautio Motorsport; 2:46:29.3
- WRC-3 winner: (Italy) Matteo Fontana (Italy) Alessandro Arnaboldi; 2:54:30.5
- J-WRC winner: (Sweden) Calle Carlberg (Norway) Jørgen Eriksen; 2:54:58.1

The 2026 Rally Sweden (also known as the 2026 Swedish Rally) was a motor racing event for rally cars held over four days from 12 to 15 February 2026. It marked the seventy-third running of the Rally Sweden, and was the second round of the 2026 World Rally Championship, 2026 WRC2 Championship and 2026 WRC3 Championship. The event was also the first round of the 2026 Junior WRC Championship. The 2026 event was based in Umeå in Västerbotten County and it consisted of eighteen special stages, covering a total competitive distance of 300.66 km (186.82 mi).

Elfyn Evans and Scott Martin were the defending rally winners, and Toyota Gazoo Racing WRT, were the defending manufacturer's winners. Oliver Solberg and Elliott Edmondson were the defending rally winners in the WRC2 championship, but as they were already signed by Toyota, to compete in the WRC this season, they did not defend their titles (same event, but for the category above). Taylor Gill and Daniel Brkic were the defending rally winners for both the WRC3, and in the Junior WRC championship.

Evans and Martin successfully defended their titles, so as Toyota. The events power stage (PS; also known as the Wolf Power Stage) winners were Thierry Neuville and Martijn Wydaeghe, and the manufacturer's PS winner were Hyundai Shell Mobis WRT.

Roope Korhonen and Anssi Viinikka were the winners in the WRC2 category. Matteo Fontana and Alessandro Arnaboldi were the winners in the WRC3 category. Calle Carlberg and Jørgen Eriksen were the winners in the junior category.

== Background ==
=== Entry list ===
The following crews entered into the rally. The event was open to crews competing in the World Rally Championship, its support categories, the WRC2 Championship, the WRC3 Championship and privateer entries that were not registered to score points in any championship. Eleven crews entered under Rally1 regulations, as were twenty-eight Rally2 crews in the WRC2 Championship and ten Rally3 crews in the WRC3 Championship. A total of seven crews participated in the Junior World Rally Championship.

Rally1 entries competing in the World Rally Championship
No.	Driver	Co-Driver	Entrant	Car	Championship eligibility	Tyre
4	(Finland) Esapekka Lappi	(Finland) Enni Mälkönen	(South Korea) Hyundai Shell Mobis WRT	Hyundai i20 N Rally1	Driver, Co-driver, Manufacturer	H
5	(Finland) Sami Pajari	(Finland) Marko Salminen	(Japan) Toyota Gazoo Racing WRT2	Toyota GR Yaris Rally1	Driver, Co-driver, Manufacturer, Team	H
11	(Belgium) Thierry Neuville	(Belgium) Martijn Wydaeghe	(South Korea) Hyundai Shell Mobis WRT	Hyundai i20 N Rally1	Driver, Co-driver, Manufacturer	H
16	(France) Adrien Fourmaux	(France) Alexandre Coria	(South Korea) Hyundai Shell Mobis WRT	Hyundai i20 N Rally1	Driver, Co-driver, Manufacturer	H
18	(Japan) Takamoto Katsuta	(Republic of Ireland) Aaron Johnston	(Japan) Toyota Gazoo Racing WRT	Toyota GR Yaris Rally1	Driver, Co-driver, Manufacturer	H
22	(Latvia) Mārtiņš Sesks	(Latvia) Renārs Francis	(United Kingdom) M-Sport Ford WRT	Ford Puma Rally1	Driver, Co-driver	H
33	(United Kingdom) Elfyn Evans	(United Kingdom) Scott Martin	(Japan) Toyota Gazoo Racing WRT	Toyota GR Yaris Rally1	Driver, Co-driver, Manufacturer	H
37	(Italy) Lorenzo Bertelli	(Italy) Simone Scattolin	(Japan) Toyota Gazoo Racing WRT	Toyota GR Yaris Rally1	Driver, Co-driver	H
55	(Republic of Ireland) Josh McErlean	(Republic of Ireland) Eoin Treacy	(United Kingdom) M-Sport Ford WRT	Ford Puma Rally1	Driver, Co-driver, Manufacturer	H
95	(Republic of Ireland) Jon Armstrong	(Republic of Ireland) Shane Byrne	(United Kingdom) M-Sport Ford WRT	Ford Puma Rally1	Driver, Co-driver, Manufacturer	H
99	(Sweden) Oliver Solberg	(United Kingdom) Elliott Edmondson	(Japan) Toyota Gazoo Racing WRT	Toyota GR Yaris Rally1	Driver, Co-driver, Manufacturer	H

Rally2 entries competing in the WRC2 Championship
No.	Driver	Co-Driver	Entrant	Car	Championship eligibility	Tyre
20	(Finland) Roope Korhonen	(Finland) Anssi Viinikka	(Finland) Rautio Motorsport	Toyota GR Yaris Rally2	Challenger Driver, Challenger Co-driver	H
21	(Finland) Mikko Heikkilä	(Finland) Kristian Temonen	(Finland) Mikko Heikkilä	Škoda Fabia RS Rally2	Challenger Driver, Challenger Co-driver	H
23	(Finland) Lauri Joona	(Finland) Antti Linnaketo	(Finland) Lauri Joona	Škoda Fabia RS Rally2	Challenger Driver, Challenger Co-driver	H
24	(Finland) Teemu Suninen	(Finland) Janni Hussi	(Finland) Teemu Suninen	Toyota GR Yaris Rally2	Driver, Co-driver	H
25	(Sweden) Isak Reiersen	(Sweden) Stefan Gustavsson	(Sweden) Isak Reiersen	Škoda Fabia RS Rally2	Challenger Driver, Challenger Co-driver	H
26	(Sweden) Mille Johansson	(Sweden) Johan Grönvall	(United Kingdom) M-Sport Ford WRT	Ford Fiesta Rally2	Challenger Driver, Challenger Co-driver, Team	H
27	(Estonia) Romet Jürgenson	(Estonia) Siim Oja	(United Kingdom) M-Sport Ford WRT	Ford Fiesta Rally2	Challenger Driver, Challenger Co-driver, Team	H
28	(Finland) Tuukka Kauppinen	(Finland) Topi Luhtinen	(Finland) Rautio Motorsport	Toyota GR Yaris Rally2	Challenger Driver, Challenger Co-driver	H
29	(Australia) Taylor Gill	(Australia) Daniel Brkic	(Australia) Taylor Gill	Toyota GR Yaris Rally2	Challenger Driver, Challenger Co-driver	H
31	(France) Mattéo Chatillon	(France) Maxence Cornuau	(France) Mattéo Chatillon	Škoda Fabia RS Rally2	Challenger Driver, Challenger Co-driver	H
32	(Sweden) Adam Grahn	(Sweden) Christoffer Bäck	(Sweden) Adam Grahn	Škoda Fabia RS Rally2	Challenger Driver, Challenger Co-driver	H
34	(France) Eliott Delecour	(France) Sabrina De Castelli	(France) Eliott Delecour	Toyota GR Yaris Rally2	Challenger Driver, Challenger Co-driver	H
36	(Norway) Jens Hvaal	(France) Stig Rune Skjærmoen	(Norway) Jens Hvaal	Škoda Fabia RS Rally2	Challenger Driver, Challenger Co-driver	H
38	(Finland) Tommi Jylhä	(Finland) Kimmo Nevanpää	(Finland) Tommi Jylhä	Toyota GR Yaris Rally2	Challenger Driver, Challenger Co-driver	H
39	(Italy) Giovanni Trentin	(Italy) Pietro Elia Ometto	(Italy) MT Racing SRL	Škoda Fabia RS Rally2	Challenger Driver, Challenger Co-driver	H
40	(Germany) Fabio Schwarz	(Germany) Pascal Raabe	(Germany) Armin Schwarz Driving Experience	Toyota GR Yaris Rally2	Challenger Driver, Challenger Co-driver	H
41	(Netherlands) Bernhard ten Brinke	(United Kingdom) Tom Woodburn	(Netherlands) Bernhard ten Brinke	Toyota GR Yaris Rally2	Challenger Driver, Challenger Co-driver	H
42	(Mexico) Alejandro Mauro	(Spain) Ariday Bonilla	(Mexico) Alejandro Mauro	Škoda Fabia RS Rally2	Challenger Driver, Challenger Co-driver	H
43	(Poland) Jarosław Kołtun	(Poland) Ireneusz Pleskot	(Poland) Jarosław Kołtun	Škoda Fabia RS Rally2	Challenger Driver, Challenger Co-driver	H
44	(Poland) Michał Sołowow	(Poland) Maciej Baran	(Finland) Printsport	Toyota GR Yaris Rally2	Challenger/Masters Driver, Challenger/Masters Co-driver	H
45	(Finland) Marko Viitanen	(Finland) Tapio Suominen	(Finland) Marko Viitanen	Toyota GR Yaris Rally2	Challenger/Masters Driver, Challenger Co-driver	H
46	(Spain) Alexander Villanueva	(Spain) Axel Coronado	(Spain) Alexander Villanueva	Toyota GR Yaris Rally2	Challenger/Masters Driver, Challenger Co-driver	H
47	(Brazil) Cristian Baumgart	(Brazil) Luis Felipe Eckel	(Brazil) Cristian Baumgart	Škoda Fabia RS Rally2	Challenger/Masters Driver, Challenger Co-driver	H
48	(Belgium) John Wartique	(Belgium) Maxime Andernack	(Belgium) John Wartique	Škoda Fabia RS Rally2	Challenger Driver, Challenger Co-driver	H
49	(Slovakia) Robert Kolčák	(Czech Republic) Petr Černohorský	(Slovakia) Chooligan Racing Team	Hyundai i20 N Rally2	Challenger Driver, Challenger Co-driver	H
50	(Turkey) Uğur Soylu	(Turkey) Onur Vatansever	(Turkey) GP Garage My Team	Škoda Fabia RS Rally2	Challenger/Masters Driver, Challenger Co-driver	H
51	(Mexico) Miguel Granados	(Spain) Marc Martí	(Mexico) Miguel Granados	Škoda Fabia RS Rally2	Challenger/Masters Driver, Challenger/Masters Co-driver	H
52	(Italy) Luciano Cobbe	(Italy) Roberto Mometti	(Italy) Luciano Cobbe	Škoda Fabia RS Rally2	Challenger/Masters Driver, Challenger/Masters Co-driver	H

Rally3 entries competing in the WRC3 Championship and/or the Junior World Rally Championship
No.	Driver	Co-Driver	Entrant	Car	Class/Championship eligibility	Tyre
53	(Italy) Matteo Fontana	(Italy) Alessandro Arnaboldi	(Italy) Matteo Fontana	Ford Fiesta Rally3	WRC3	H
54	(Poland) Tymoteusz Abramowski	(Poland) Jakub Wróbel	(Poland) Tymoteusz Abramowski	Ford Fiesta Rally3	WRC3	H
56	(Peru) André Martinez	(Argentina) Matias Aranguren	(Peru) André Martinez	Ford Fiesta Rally3	WRC3	H
57	(France) Eric Royère	(France) Alexis Grenier	(France) Eric Royère	Ford Fiesta Rally3	WRC3	H
58	(Greece) Georgios Vasilakis	(Republic of Ireland) Allan Harryman	(Greece) Georgios Vasilakis	Ford Fiesta Rally3	WRC3, Masters Driver, Masters Co-Driver	H
59	(Spain) Nicolas Otto Boehringer	(Portugal) Hugo Magalhães	(Spain) Nicolas Otto Boehringer	Ford Fiesta Rally3	WRC3	H
60	(Turkey) Ali Türkkan	(Turkey) Oytun Albaykar	(Turkey) Castrol Ford Team Türkiye	Ford Fiesta Rally3	WRC3, Junior WRC	H
61	(Republic of Ireland) Craig Rahill	(Republic of Ireland) Conor Smith	(Republic of Ireland) Motorsport Ireland Rally Academy	Ford Fiesta Rally3	Junior WRC	H
62	(Sweden) Calle Carlberg	(Norway) Jørgen Eriksen	(Sweden) Calle Carlberg	Ford Fiesta Rally3	Junior WRC	H
63	(Turkey) Kerem Kazaz	(France) Corentin Silvestre	(Turkey) Team Petrol Ofisi	Ford Fiesta Rally3	WRC3, Junior WRC	H
64	(Finland) Leevi Lassila	(Finland) Mikko Lukka	(Finland) Leevi Lassila	Ford Fiesta Rally3	Junior WRC	H
65	(Spain) Raúl Hernández	(Spain) José Murado	(Spain) Raúl Hernández	Ford Fiesta Rally3	WRC3, Junior WRC	H
66	(Spain) Gil Membrado	(Spain) Adrián Pérez	(Spain) Gil Membrado	Ford Fiesta Rally3	WRC3, Junior WRC	H

Other major entries
No.	Driver	Co-Driver	Entrant	Car	Championship eligibility	Tyre
30	(Spain) Alejandro Cachón	(Spain) Borja Rozada	(Spain) Toyota España	Toyota GR Yaris Rally2	—N/a	H
35	(Japan) Yuki Yamamoto	(Republic of Ireland) James Fulton	(Finland) Printsport	Toyota GR Yaris Rally2	—N/a	H
69	(Peru) Jorge Martínez	(Argentina) Marcelo Brizio	(Peru) Jorge Martínez	Hyundai i20 N Rally2	Masters Driver, Masters Co-driver	H

=== Itinerary ===
All dates and times are CET (UTC+1).

Date	No.	Time span	Stage name	Distance
12 February	—N/a	After 9:01	Umeå City [Shakedown]	3.44 km
12 February		After 18:40	Opening ceremony, Red Barn Arena	—N/a
12 February	SS1	After 19:05	Umeå 1	10.23 km
13 February	SS2	After 10:07	Bygdsiljum 1	27.55 km
13 February	SS3	After 11:08	Andersvattnet 1	20.51 km
13 February	SS4	After 12:16	Bäck 1	11.53 km
13 February		13:24 – 13:48	Regroup, Umeå	—N/a
13 February		13:48 – 14:18	Service A, Umeå	—N/a
13 February	SS5	After 15:40	Bygdsiljum 2	27.55 km
13 February	SS6	After 16:41	Andersvattnet 2	20.51 km
13 February	SS7	After 17:49	Bäck 2	11.53 km
13 February	SS8	After 19:05	Umeå Sprint 1	5.70 km
13 February		19:45 – 20:30	Flexi service B, Umeå	—N/a
14 February	SS9	After 10:10	Vännäs 1	15.70 km
14 February	SS10	After 11:05	Sarsjöliden 1	16.72 km
14 February	SS11	After 11:59	Kolksele 1	16.94 km
14 February		13:09 – 13:50	Regroup, Umeå	—N/a
14 February		13:50 – 14:20	Service C, Umeå	—N/a
14 February	SS12	After 14:10	Vännäs 2	15.70 km
14 February	SS13	After 15:05	Sarsjöliden 2	16.72 km
14 February	SS14	After 16:08	Kolksele 2	16.94 km
14 February	SS15	After 18:05	Umeå Sprint 2	5.16 km
14 February		18:45 – 19:30	Flexi service D, Umeå	—N/a
15 February	SS16	After 7:33	Västervik 1	25.45 km
15 February		8:33 – 8:48	Regroup, Umeå	—N/a
15 February		8:48 – 9:03	Service E, Umeå	—N/a
15 February	SS17	After 10:11	Västervik 2	25.45 km
15 February		11:11 – 11:41	Regroup, Red Barn	—N/a
15 February	SS18	After 12:15	Umeå 2 [Power Stage]	10.23 km
15 February		After 12:45	Finish, Umeå	—N/a
15 February		After 13:30	Podium ceremony, Red Barn Arena	—N/a

== Report ==
=== WRC Rally1 ===
==== Classification ====
Position		No.	Driver	Co-driver	Entrant	Car	Time	Difference	Points			
Event	Class	No.	Driver	Co-driver	Entrant	Car	Time	Difference	Event	Sunday	Stage	Total
1	1	33	Elfyn Evans	Scott Martin	Toyota Gazoo Racing WRT	Toyota GR Yaris Rally1	2:35:53.1	0.0	25	5	4	34
2	2	18	Takamoto Katsuta	Aaron Johnston	Toyota Gazoo Racing WRT	Toyota GR Yaris Rally1	2:36:07.4	+14.3	17	4	3	24
3	3	5	Sami Pajari	Marko Salminen	Toyota Gazoo Racing WRT2	Toyota GR Yaris Rally1	2:36:39.1	+46.0	15	2	0	17
4	4	99	Oliver Solberg	Elliott Edmondson	Toyota Gazoo Racing WRT	Toyota GR Yaris Rally1	2:37:04.7	+1:11.6	12	3	2	17
5	5	16	Adrien Fourmaux	Alexandre Coria	Hyundai Shell Mobis WRT	Hyundai i20 N Rally1	2:37:43.4	+1:50.3	10	1	0	11
6	6	4	Esapekka Lappi	Enni Mälkönen	Hyundai Shell Mobis WRT	Hyundai i20 N Rally1	2:37:46.3	+1:53.2	8	0	1	9
7	7	11	Thierry Neuville	Martijn Wydaeghe	Hyundai Shell Mobis WRT	Hyundai i20 N Rally1	2:39:39.0	+3:45.9	6	0	5	11
8	8	95	Jon Armstrong	Shane Byrne	M-Sport Ford WRT	Ford Puma Rally1	2:39:58.6	+4:05.5	4	0	0	4
9	9	55	Josh McErlean	Eoin Treacy	M-Sport Ford WRT	Ford Puma Rally1	2:41:58.5	+6:05.4	2	0	0	2
15	10	37	Lorenzo Bertelli	Simone Scattolin	Toyota Gazoo Racing WRT	Toyota GR Yaris Rally1	2:53:33.6	+17:40.5	0	0	0	0
35	11	22	Mārtiņš Sesks	Renārs Francis	M-Sport Ford WRT	Ford Puma Rally1	3:27:14.6	+51:21.5	0	0	0	0

==== Special stages ====
Stage	Winners	Car	Time	Class leaders
SD	Neuville / Wydaeghe	Hyundai i20 N Rally1	1:51.8	—N/a
SS1	Solberg / Edmondson	Toyota GR Yaris Rally1	5:53.1	Solberg / Edmondson
SS2	Evans / Martin	Toyota GR Yaris Rally1	12:43.2	Evans / Martin
SS3	Evans / Martin	Toyota GR Yaris Rally1	10:33.8	Evans / Martin
SS4	Solberg / Edmondson	Toyota GR Yaris Rally1	6:40.7	Evans / Martin
SS5	Katsuta / Johnston	Toyota GR Yaris Rally1	12:50.9	Evans / Martin
SS6	Katsuta / Johnston	Toyota GR Yaris Rally1	10:45.0	Evans / Martin
SS7	Neuville / Wydaeghe	Hyundai i20 N Rally1	6:54.8	Katsuta / Johnston
SS8	Solberg / Edmondson	Toyota GR Yaris Rally1	3:49.1	Katsuta / Johnston
SS9	Evans / Martin	Toyota GR Yaris Rally1	8:40.7	Evans / Martin
SS10	Sesks / Francis	Ford Puma Rally1	7:56.5	Evans / Martin
SS11	Solberg / Edmondson	Toyota GR Yaris Rally1	8:28.4	Evans / Martin
SS12	Pajari / Salminen	Toyota GR Yaris Rally1	8:47.0	Evans / Martin
SS13	Evans / Martin	Toyota GR Yaris Rally1	8:02.9	Evans / Martin
SS14	Pajari / Salminen	Toyota GR Yaris Rally1	8:43.5	Evans / Martin
SS15	Katsuta / Johnston	Toyota GR Yaris Rally1	3:48.4	Evans / Martin
SS16	Evans / Martin	Toyota GR Yaris Rally1	12:21.1	Evans / Martin
SS17	Katsuta / Johnston	Toyota GR Yaris Rally1	12:20.6	Evans / Martin
SS18	Neuville / Wydaeghe	Hyundai i20 N Rally1	5:56.0	Evans / Martin

==== Championship standings ====
Drivers' Standings
Move	Pos.	Driver	Points
1	1	Elfyn Evans	60
1	2	Oliver Solberg	47
4	3	Takamoto Katsuta	30
	4	Adrien Fourmaux	28
	5	Thierry Neuville	21

Co-drivers' Standings
Move	Pos.	Driver	Points
1	1	Scott Martin	60
1	2	Elliott Edmondson	47
4	3	Vincent Landais	30
	4	Alexandre Coria	28
	5	Martijn Wydaeghe	21

Manufacturers' Standings
Move	Pos.	Driver	Points
	1	Toyota Gazoo Racing WRT	117
	2	Hyundai Shell Mobis WRT	66
New entry	3	Toyota Gazoo Racing WRT2	18
New entry	4	M-Sport Ford WRT	14

=== WRC2 Rally2 ===
==== Classification ====
Position		No.	Driver	Co-driver	Entrant	Car	Time	Difference	Points	
Event	Class	No.	Driver	Co-driver	Entrant	Car	Time	Difference	Class	Event
10	1	20	Roope Korhonen	Anssi Viinikka	Rautio Motorsport	Toyota GR Yaris Rally2	2:46:29.3	0.0	25	1
11	2	24	Teemu Suninen	Janni Hussi	Teemu Suninen	Toyota GR Yaris Rally2	2:46:39.5	+10.2	17	0
12	3	23	Lauri Joona	Antti Linnaketo	Lauri Joona	Škoda Fabia RS Rally2	2:47:27.7	+58.4	15	0
13	4	29	Taylor Gill	Daniel Brkic	Taylor Gill	Toyota GR Yaris Rally2	2:49:03.5	+2:34.2	12	0
14	5	25	Isak Reiersen	Stefan Gustavsson	Isak Reiersen	Škoda Fabia RS Rally2	2:49:26.2	+2:56.9	10	0
18	6	44	Michał Sołowow	Maciej Baran	Printsport	Toyota GR Yaris Rally2	2:55:24.1	+8:54.8	8	0
19	7	38	Tommi Jylhä	Kimmo Nevanpää	Tommi Jylhä	Toyota GR Yaris Rally2	2:56:39.9	+10:10.6	6	0
22	8	39	Giovanni Trentin	Pietro Elia Ometto	MT Racing SRL	Škoda Fabia RS Rally2	2:58:55.0	+12:25.7	4	0
24	9	45	Marko Viitanen	Tapio Suominen	Marko Viitanen	Toyota GR Yaris Rally2	3:03:52.6	+17:23.3	2	0
25	10	31	Mattéo Chatillon	Maxence Cornuau	Mattéo Chatillon	Škoda Fabia RS Rally2	3:06:23.5	+19:54.2	1	0
27	11	47	Cristian Baumgart	Luis Felipe Eckel	Cristian Baumgart	Škoda Fabia RS Rally2	3:09:20.5	+22:51.2	0	0
28	12	51	Miguel Granados	Marc Martí	Miguel Granados	Škoda Fabia RS Rally2	3:09:20.8	+22:51.5	0	0
29	13	48	John Wartique	Maxime Andernack	John Wartique	Škoda Fabia RS Rally2	3:10:35.5	+24:06.2	0	0
36	14	27	Romet Jürgenson	Siim Oja	M-Sport Ford WRT	Ford Fiesta Rally2	3:29:02.7	+42:33.4	0	0
38	15	41	Bernhard ten Brinke	Tom Woodburn	Bernhard ten Brinke	Toyota GR Yaris Rally2	3:31:25.6	+44:56.3	0	0
39	16	52	Luciano Cobbe	Roberto Mometti	Luciano Cobbe	Škoda Fabia RS Rally2	3:31:51.3	+45:22.0	0	0
40	17	50	Uğur Soylu	Onur Vatansever	GP Garage My Team	Škoda Fabia RS Rally2	3:33:33.6	+47:04.3	0	0
41	18	34	Eliott Delecour	Sabrina De Castelli	Eliott Delecour	Toyota GR Yaris Rally2	3:34:17.4	+47:48.1	0	0
44	19	49	Robert Kolčák	Petr Černohorský	Chooligan Racing Team	Hyundai i20 N Rally2	3:48:16.1	+1:01:46.8	0	0
45	20	43	Jarosław Kołtun	Ireneusz Pleskot	Jarosław Kołtun	Škoda Fabia RS Rally2	3:53:27.7	+1:06:58.4	0	0
46	21	42	Alejandro Mauro	Ariday Bonilla	Alejandro Mauro	Škoda Fabia RS Rally2	4:22:43.5	+1:36:14.2	0	0
Retired SS16		28	Tuukka Kauppinen	Topi Luhtinen	Rautio Motorsport	Toyota GR Yaris Rally2	Engine		0	0
Retired SS9		21	Mikko Heikkilä	Kristian Temonen	Mikko Heikkilä	Škoda Fabia RS Rally2	Personal		0	0
Retired SS9		26	Mille Johansson	Johan Grönvall	M-Sport Ford WRT	Ford Fiesta Rally2	Rollcage damage		0	0
Retired SS6		46	Alexander Villanueva	Axel Coronado	Alexander Villanueva	Toyota GR Yaris Rally2	Accident		0	0
Retired SS1		32	Adam Grahn	Christoffer Bäck	Adam Grahn	Škoda Fabia RS Rally2	Accident		0	0
Retired SS1		40	Fabio Schwarz	Pascal Raabe	Armin Schwarz Driving Experience	Toyota GR Yaris Rally2	Mechanical		0	0

==== Special stages ====
Overall
Stage	Winners	Car	Time	Class leaders
SD	Kauppinen / Luhtinen	Toyota GR Yaris Rally2	1:57.2	—N/a
SS1	Joona / Vaaleri	Škoda Fabia RS Rally2	6:24.4	Joona / Vaaleri
SS2	Korhonen / Viinikka	Toyota GR Yaris Rally2	13:41.9	Korhonen / Viinikka
SS3	Korhonen / Viinikka	Toyota GR Yaris Rally2	11:22.7	Korhonen / Viinikka
SS4	Heikkilä / Temonen	Škoda Fabia RS Rally2	7:09.8	Korhonen / Viinikka
SS5	Suninen / Hussi	Toyota GR Yaris Rally2	13:45.1	Korhonen / Viinikka
SS6	Suninen / Hussi	Toyota GR Yaris Rally2	11:26.3	Korhonen / Viinikka
SS6	Jürgenson / Oja	Ford Fiesta Rally2	11:26.3	Korhonen / Viinikka
SS7	Korhonen / Viinikka	Toyota GR Yaris Rally2	7:10.9	Korhonen / Viinikka
SS8	Korhonen / Viinikka	Toyota GR Yaris Rally2	4:00.2	Korhonen / Viinikka
SS9	Korhonen / Viinikka	Toyota GR Yaris Rally2	9:26.4	Korhonen / Viinikka
SS10	Korhonen / Viinikka	Toyota GR Yaris Rally2	8:34.9	Korhonen / Viinikka
SS11	Korhonen / Viinikka	Toyota GR Yaris Rally2	9:07.7	Korhonen / Viinikka
SS12	Kauppinen / Luhtinen	Toyota GR Yaris Rally2	9:20.5	Korhonen / Viinikka
SS13	Suninen / Hussi	Toyota GR Yaris Rally2	8:38.3	Korhonen / Viinikka
SS14	Korhonen / Viinikka	Toyota GR Yaris Rally2	9:15.8	Korhonen / Viinikka
SS15	Korhonen / Viinikka	Toyota GR Yaris Rally2	3:56.4	Korhonen / Viinikka
SS16	Korhonen / Viinikka	Toyota GR Yaris Rally2	13:18.5	Korhonen / Viinikka
SS17	Suninen / Hussi	Toyota GR Yaris Rally2	13:10.8	Korhonen / Viinikka
SS18	Suninen / Hussi	Toyota GR Yaris Rally2	6:13.8	Korhonen / Viinikka

Challenger
Stage	Winners	Car	Time	Class leaders
SD	Kauppinen / Luhtinen	Toyota GR Yaris Rally2	1:57.2	—N/a
SS1	Joona / Vaaleri	Škoda Fabia RS Rally2	6:24.4	Joona / Vaaleri
SS2	Korhonen / Viinikka	Toyota GR Yaris Rally2	13:41.9	Korhonen / Viinikka
SS3	Korhonen / Viinikka	Toyota GR Yaris Rally2	11:22.7	Korhonen / Viinikka
SS4	Heikkilä / Temonen	Škoda Fabia RS Rally2	7:09.8	Korhonen / Viinikka
SS5	Kauppinen / Luhtinen	Toyota GR Yaris Rally2	13:45.6	Korhonen / Viinikka
SS6	Jürgenson / Oja	Ford Fiesta Rally2	11:26.3	Korhonen / Viinikka
SS7	Korhonen / Viinikka	Toyota GR Yaris Rally2	7:10.9	Korhonen / Viinikka
SS8	Korhonen / Viinikka	Toyota GR Yaris Rally2	4:00.2	Korhonen / Viinikka
SS9	Korhonen / Viinikka	Toyota GR Yaris Rally2	9:26.4	Korhonen / Viinikka
SS10	Korhonen / Viinikka	Toyota GR Yaris Rally2	8:34.9	Korhonen / Viinikka
SS11	Korhonen / Viinikka	Toyota GR Yaris Rally2	9:07.7	Korhonen / Viinikka
SS12	Kauppinen / Luhtinen	Toyota GR Yaris Rally2	9:20.5	Korhonen / Viinikka
SS13	Korhonen / Viinikka	Toyota GR Yaris Rally2	8:40.0	Korhonen / Viinikka
SS14	Korhonen / Viinikka	Toyota GR Yaris Rally2	9:15.8	Korhonen / Viinikka
SS15	Korhonen / Viinikka	Toyota GR Yaris Rally2	3:56.4	Korhonen / Viinikka
SS16	Korhonen / Viinikka	Toyota GR Yaris Rally2	13:18.5	Korhonen / Viinikka
SS17	Trentin / Ometto	Škoda Fabia RS Rally2	13:10.9	Korhonen / Viinikka
SS18	Korhonen / Viinikka	Toyota GR Yaris Rally2	6:14.8	Korhonen / Viinikka

==== Championship standings ====
Drivers' Standings
Move	Pos.	Driver	Points
	1	Léo Rossel	25
New entry	2	Roope Korhonen	25
1	3	Roberto Daprà	17
New entry	4	Teemu Suninen	17
2	5	Arthur Pelamourges	15

Co-drivers' Standings
Move	Pos.	Driver	Points
	1	Guillaume Mercoiret	25
New entry	2	Anssi Viinikka	25
1	3	Luca Guglielmetti	17
New entry	4	Janni Hussi	17
2	5	Bastien Pouget	15

Manufacturers' Standings
Move	Pos.	Driver	Points
	1	Lancia Corse HF	42
New entry	2	M-Sport Ford WRT	25

Challenger Drivers' Standings
Move	Pos.	Driver	Points
	1	Léo Rossel	25
New entry	2	Roope Korhonen	25
1	3	Roberto Daprà	17
New entry	4	Lauri Joona	17
2	5	Arthur Pelamourges	15

Challenger Co-drivers' Standings
Move	Pos.	Driver	Points
	1	Guillaume Mercoiret	25
New entry	2	Anssi Viinikka	25
1	3	Luca Guglielmetti	17
New entry	4	Antti Linnaketo	17
2	5	Bastien Pouget	15

=== WRC3 Rally3 ===
==== Classification ====
Position		No.	Driver	Co-driver	Entrant	Car	Time	Difference	Points
Event	Class	No.	Driver	Co-driver	Entrant	Car	Time	Difference	Points
16	1	53	Matteo Fontana	Alessandro Arnaboldi	Matteo Fontana	Ford Fiesta Rally3	2:54:30.5	0.0	25
21	2	54	Tymoteusz Abramowski	Jakub Wróbel	Tymoteusz Abramowski	Ford Fiesta Rally3	2:57:21.8	+2:51.3	17
23	3	65	Raúl Hernández	José Murado	Raúl Hernández	Ford Fiesta Rally3	2:59:00.4	+4:29.9	15
26	4	66	Gil Membrado	Adrián Pérez	Gil Membrado	Ford Fiesta Rally3	3:07:05.8	+12:35.3	12
30	5	56	André Martinez	Matias Aranguren	André Martinez	Ford Fiesta Rally3	3:14:00.6	+19:30.1	10
32	6	57	Eric Royère	Alexis Grenier	Eric Royère	Ford Fiesta Rally3	3:20:41.9	+26:11.4	8
33	7	58	Georgios Vasilakis	Allan Harryman	Georgios Vasilakis	Ford Fiesta Rally3	3:21:16.9	+26:46.4	6
42	8	60	Ali Türkkan	Oytun Albaykar	Castrol Ford Team Türkiye	Ford Fiesta Rally3	3:35:27.8	+40:57.3	4
43	9	63	Kerem Kazaz	Corentin Silvestre	Team Petrol Ofisi	Ford Fiesta Rally3	3:36:59.6	+42:29.1	2
Retired SS13		59	Nicolas Otto Boehringer	Hugo Magalhães	Nicolas Otto Boehringer	Ford Fiesta Rally3	Rolled		0

==== Special stages ====
Stage	Winners	Car	Time	Class leaders
SD	Fontana / Arnaboldi	Ford Fiesta Rally3	2:05.0	—N/a
SS1	Türkkan / Albaykar	Ford Fiesta Rally3	6:43.9	Türkkan / Albaykar
SS2	Türkkan / Albaykar	Ford Fiesta Rally3	14:31.2	Türkkan / Albaykar
SS3	Kazaz / Silvestre	Ford Fiesta Rally3	11:53.5	Türkkan / Albaykar
SS4	Türkkan / Albaykar	Ford Fiesta Rally3	7:28.9	Türkkan / Albaykar
SS5	Fontana / Arnaboldi	Ford Fiesta Rally3	14:32.4	Fontana / Arnaboldi
SS6	Stage cancelled			
SS7	Fontana / Arnaboldi	Ford Fiesta Rally3	7:21.7	Fontana / Arnaboldi
SS8	Hernández / Murado	Ford Fiesta Rally3	4:08.5	Fontana / Arnaboldi
SS9	Fontana / Arnaboldi	Ford Fiesta Rally3	9:46.3	Fontana / Arnaboldi
SS10	Fontana / Arnaboldi	Ford Fiesta Rally3	9:02.9	Fontana / Arnaboldi
SS11	Fontana / Arnaboldi	Ford Fiesta Rally3	9:33.8	Fontana / Arnaboldi
SS12	Fontana / Arnaboldi; Türkkan / Albaykar	Ford Fiesta Rally3; Ford Fiesta Rally3	9:43.8	Fontana / Arnaboldi
SS13	Fontana / Arnaboldi	Ford Fiesta Rally3	9:02.3	Fontana / Arnaboldi
SS14	Fontana / Arnaboldi	Ford Fiesta Rally3	9:47.1	Fontana / Arnaboldi
SS15	Fontana / Arnaboldi	Ford Fiesta Rally3	4:05.8	Fontana / Arnaboldi
SS16	Türkkan / Albaykar	Ford Fiesta Rally3	13:53.0	Fontana / Arnaboldi
SS17	Fontana / Arnaboldi	Ford Fiesta Rally3	13:53.3	Fontana / Arnaboldi
SS18	Abramowski / Wróbel	Ford Fiesta Rally3	6:32.8	Fontana / Arnaboldi

==== Championship standings ====
Drivers' Standings
Move	Pos.	Driver	Points
1	1	Matteo Fontana	42
1	2	Eric Royère	33
New entry	3	Tymoteusz Abramowski	17
1	4	Ghjuvanni Rossi	15
New entry	5	Raúl Hernández	15

Co-drivers' Standings
Move	Pos.	Driver	Points
1	1	Alessandro Arnaboldi	42
1	2	Alexis Grenier	33
New entry	3	Jakub Wróbel	17
1	4	Kylian Sarmezan	15
New entry	5	José Murado	15

=== Junior WRC Rally3 ===
==== Classification ====
Position		No.	Driver	Co-driver	Entrant	Car	Time	Difference	Points	
Event	Class	No.	Driver	Co-driver	Entrant	Car	Time	Difference	Class	Stage
17	1	62	Calle Carlberg	Jørgen Eriksen	Calle Carlberg	Ford Fiesta Rally3	2:54:58.1	0.0	25	12
20	2	64	Leevi Lassila	Mikko Lukka	Leevi Lassila	Ford Fiesta Rally3	2:56:50.6	+1:52.5	17	1
23	3	65	Raúl Hernández	José Murado	Raúl Hernández	Ford Fiesta Rally3	2:59:00.4	+4:02.3	15	0
26	4	66	Gil Membrado	Adrián Pérez	Gil Membrado	Ford Fiesta Rally3	3:07:05.8	+12:07.7	12	0
42	5	60	Ali Türkkan	Oytun Albaykar	Castrol Ford Team Türkiye	Ford Fiesta Rally3	3:35:27.8	+40:29.7	10	4
43	6	63	Kerem Kazaz	Corentin Silvestre	Team Petrol Ofisi	Ford Fiesta Rally3	3:36:59.6	+42:01.5	8	0
Retired SS17		61	Craig Rahill	Conor Smith	Motorsport Ireland Rally Academy	Ford Fiesta Rally3	Accident		0	0

==== Special stages ====
Stage	Winners	Car	Time	Class leaders
SD	Türkkan / Albaykar	Ford Fiesta Rally3	2:05.3	—N/a
SS1	Türkkan / Albaykar	Ford Fiesta Rally3	6:43.9	Türkkan / Albaykar
SS2	Türkkan / Albaykar	Ford Fiesta Rally3	14:31.2	Türkkan / Albaykar
SS3	Carlberg / Eriksen	Ford Fiesta Rally3	11:47.8	Türkkan / Albaykar
SS4	Carlberg / Eriksen	Ford Fiesta Rally3	7:21.9	Carlberg / Eriksen
SS5	Lassila / Lukka	Ford Fiesta Rally3	14:39.2	Carlberg / Eriksen
SS6	Stage cancelled			
SS7	Carlberg / Eriksen	Ford Fiesta Rally3	7:25.7	Carlberg / Eriksen
SS8	Carlberg / Eriksen	Ford Fiesta Rally3	4:05.7	Carlberg / Eriksen
SS9	Carlberg / Eriksen	Ford Fiesta Rally3	9:49.6	Carlberg / Eriksen
SS10	Carlberg / Eriksen	Ford Fiesta Rally3	9:04.1	Carlberg / Eriksen
SS11	Carlberg / Eriksen	Ford Fiesta Rally3	9:35.6	Carlberg / Eriksen
SS12	Türkkan / Albaykar	Ford Fiesta Rally3	9:43.8	Carlberg / Eriksen
SS13	Carlberg / Eriksen	Ford Fiesta Rally3	9:07.4	Carlberg / Eriksen
SS14	Carlberg / Eriksen	Ford Fiesta Rally3	9:42.9	Carlberg / Eriksen
SS15	Carlberg / Eriksen	Ford Fiesta Rally3	4:05.5	Carlberg / Eriksen
SS16	Türkkan / Albaykar	Ford Fiesta Rally3	13:53.0	Carlberg / Eriksen
SS17	Carlberg / Eriksen	Ford Fiesta Rally3	13:54.5	Carlberg / Eriksen
SS18	Carlberg / Eriksen	Ford Fiesta Rally3	6:28.3	Carlberg / Eriksen

==== Championship standings ====
Drivers' Standings
Move	Pos.	Driver	Points
New entry	1	Calle Carlberg	37
New entry	2	Leevi Lassila	18
New entry	3	Raúl Hernández	15
New entry	4	Ali Türkkan	14
New entry	5	Gil Membrado	12

Co-drivers' Standings
Move	Pos.	Driver	Points
New entry	1	Jørgen Eriksen	37
New entry	2	Mikko Lukka	18
New entry	3	José Murado	15
New entry	4	Oytun Albaykar	14
New entry	5	Adrián Pérez	12

Previous rally: 2026 Monte Carlo Rally	2026 FIA World Rally Championship	Next rally: 2026 Safari Rally
Previous rally: 2025 Rally Sweden	2026 Rally Sweden	Next rally: 2027 Rally Sweden
