= Martijn Wydaeghe =

Belgian rally co-driver (born 1992)

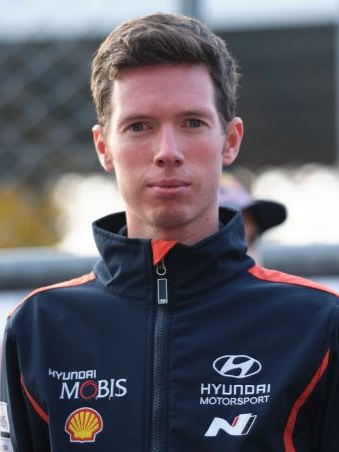
- Wydaeghe in 2023

Personal information
- Nationality: (Belgium) Belgian
- Born: 1 September 1992 (age 34); Izegem, Belgium

World Rally Championship record
- Years active: 2013–2019, 2021–present
- Driver: (Belgium) Philip Cracco (Belgium) Pieter Jan Michiel Cracco (Netherlands) Mats van den Brand (South Korea) Chewon Lim (Netherlands) Kevin Abbring (Italy) Tamara Molinaro (Belgium) Guillaume De Mévius (Belgium) Thierry Neuville
- Teams: Hyundai Motorsport
- Rallies: 89
- Championships: 1 (2024)
- Rally wins: 10
- Podiums: 32
- Stage wins: 192
- First rally: 2013 Rallye de France-Alsace
- First win: 2021 Ypres Rally
- Last win: 2026 Rally de Portugal
- Last rally: 2026 Rally Italia Sardegna

Martijn Wydaeghe (Dutch pronunciation: [mɑrˈtɛiɱ ˈʋidaːxə]; born 1 September 1992) is a Belgian rallying co-driver. He is partnered with Thierry Neuville for Hyundai Motorsport in the World Rally Championship category.

== Rally career ==
Wydaeghe made his WRC debut at the 2013 Rallye de France-Alsace with Philip Cracco. He currently co-drives with 2024 champion Thierry Neuville, after having worked with compatriot Nicolas Gilsoul until 2020.

== Rally victories ==
=== WRC victories ===
| # | Event | Season | Driver | Car |
|---|---|---|---|---|
| 1 | (Belgium) Ypres Rally | 2021 | (Belgium) Thierry Neuville | Hyundai i20 Coupe WRC |
| 2 | (Spain) Rally Catalunya | 2021 | (Belgium) Thierry Neuville | Hyundai i20 Coupe WRC |
| 3 | (Greece) Acropolis Rally | 2022 | (Belgium) Thierry Neuville | Hyundai i20 N Rally1 |
| 4 | Rally Japan | 2022 | (Belgium) Thierry Neuville | Hyundai i20 N Rally1 |
| 5 | (Italy) Rally d'Italia Sardegna | 2023 | (Belgium) Thierry Neuville | Hyundai i20 N Rally1 |
| 6 | (Europe) Central European Rally | 2023 | (Belgium) Thierry Neuville | Hyundai i20 N Rally1 |
| 7 | (Monaco) Monte Carlo Rally | 2024 | (Belgium) Thierry Neuville | Hyundai i20 N Rally1 |
| 8 | (Greece) Acropolis Rally | 2024 | (Belgium) Thierry Neuville | Hyundai i20 N Rally1 |
| 9 | Rally Saudi Arabia | 2025 | (Belgium) Thierry Neuville | Hyundai i20 N Rally1 |
| 10 | Rally de Portugal | 2026 | (Belgium) Thierry Neuville | Hyundai i20 N Rally1 |

== Rally results ==
=== WRC results ===
| Year | Entrant | Car | 1 | 2 | 3 | 4 | 5 | 6 | 7 | 8 | 9 | 10 | 11 | 12 | 13 | 14 | WDC | Points |
|---|---|---|---|---|---|---|---|---|---|---|---|---|---|---|---|---|---|---|
| 2013 | Philip Cracco | Ford Fiesta R5 | MON | SWE | MEX | POR | ARG | GRE | ITA | FIN | GER | AUS | FRA; 22 | ESP | GBR | | NC | 0 |
| 2014 | Autostal Duindistel | Ford Fiesta R2 | MON | SWE | MEX | POR | ARG | ITA | POL | FIN | GER; Ret | AUS | FRA | ESP | GBR | | NC | 0 |
| 2015 | Mats van den Brand | Ford Fiesta R2T | MON | SWE | MEX | ARG | POR; 50 | ITA | POL; Ret | FIN; 53 | GER; 31 | AUS | FRA | ESP; Ret | GBR | | NC | 0 |
| 2016 | Chewon Lim | Opel Adam R2 | MON | SWE | MEX | ARG | POR | ITA | POL | FIN | GER; Ret | CHN; C | FRA | ESP | GBR | AUS | NC | 0 |
| 2017 | Hyundai Motorsport N | Hyundai i20 R5 | MON; 31 | SWE | MEX | FRA | ARG | POR | ITA | POL | FIN | GER; 22 | ESP | GBR | AUS | | NC | 0 |
| 2018 | Tamara Molinaro | Ford Fiesta R5 | MON | SWE; 35 | MEX | FRA | ARG | POR | ITA | FIN | GER | TUR | GBR | ESP | AUS | | NC | 0 |
| 2019 | Guillaume De Mévius | Citroën C3 R5 | MON; Ret | SWE | MEX | FRA; 19 | ARG | CHL | POR; 17 | ITA; 34 | FIN | GER; 35 | TUR | GBR; 34 | ESP; 20 | AUS; C | NC | 0 |
| 2021 | Hyundai Shell Mobis WRT | Hyundai i20 Coupe WRC | MON; 3 | ARC; 3 | CRO; 3 | POR; 36 | ITA; 3 | KEN; Ret | EST; 3 | BEL; 1 | GRE; 8 | FIN; Ret | ESP; 1 | MNZ; 4 | | | 3rd | 176 |
| 2022 | Hyundai Shell Mobis WRT | Hyundai i20 N Rally1 | MON; 6 | SWE; 2 | CRO; 3 | POR; 5 | ITA; 41 | KEN; 5 | EST; 4 | FIN; 5 | BEL; 20 | GRE; 1 | NZL; 4 | ESP; 2 | JPN; 1 | | 3rd | 193 |
| 2023 | Hyundai Shell Mobis WRT | Hyundai i20 N Rally1 | MON; 3 | SWE; 3 | MEX; 2 | CRO; 33 | POR; 5 | ITA; 1 | KEN; DSQ | EST; 2 | FIN; 2 | GRE; 20 | CHL; 2 | EUR; 1 | JPN; 13 | | 3rd | 189 |
| 2024 | Hyundai Shell Mobis WRT | Hyundai i20 N Rally1 | MON; 1 | SWE; 4 | KEN; 5 | CRO; 3 | POR; 3 | ITA; 41 | POL; 4 | LAT; 8 | FIN; 2 | GRE; 1 | CHL; 4 | EUR; 3 | JPN; 6 | | 1st | 242 |
| 2025 | Hyundai Shell Mobis WRT | Hyundai i20 N Rally1 | MON; 6 | SWE; 3 | KEN; 3 | ESP; 7 | POR; 4 | ITA; 19 | GRE; 5 | EST; 3 | FIN; 6 | PAR; 3 | CHL; 4 | EUR; Ret | JPN; Ret | SAU; 1 | 5th | 194 |
| 2026 | Hyundai Shell Mobis WRT | Hyundai i20 N Rally1 | MON; 5 | SWE; 7 | KEN; 12 | CRO; Ret | ESP; 6 | POR; 1 | JPN; 6 | GRE; 2 | EST; 4 | FIN; 5 | PAR; 37 | CHL; Ret | ITA; 15 | | 7th | 134 |

* Season still in progress.
