= Marko Salminen =

Finnish rally co-driver (born 1978)

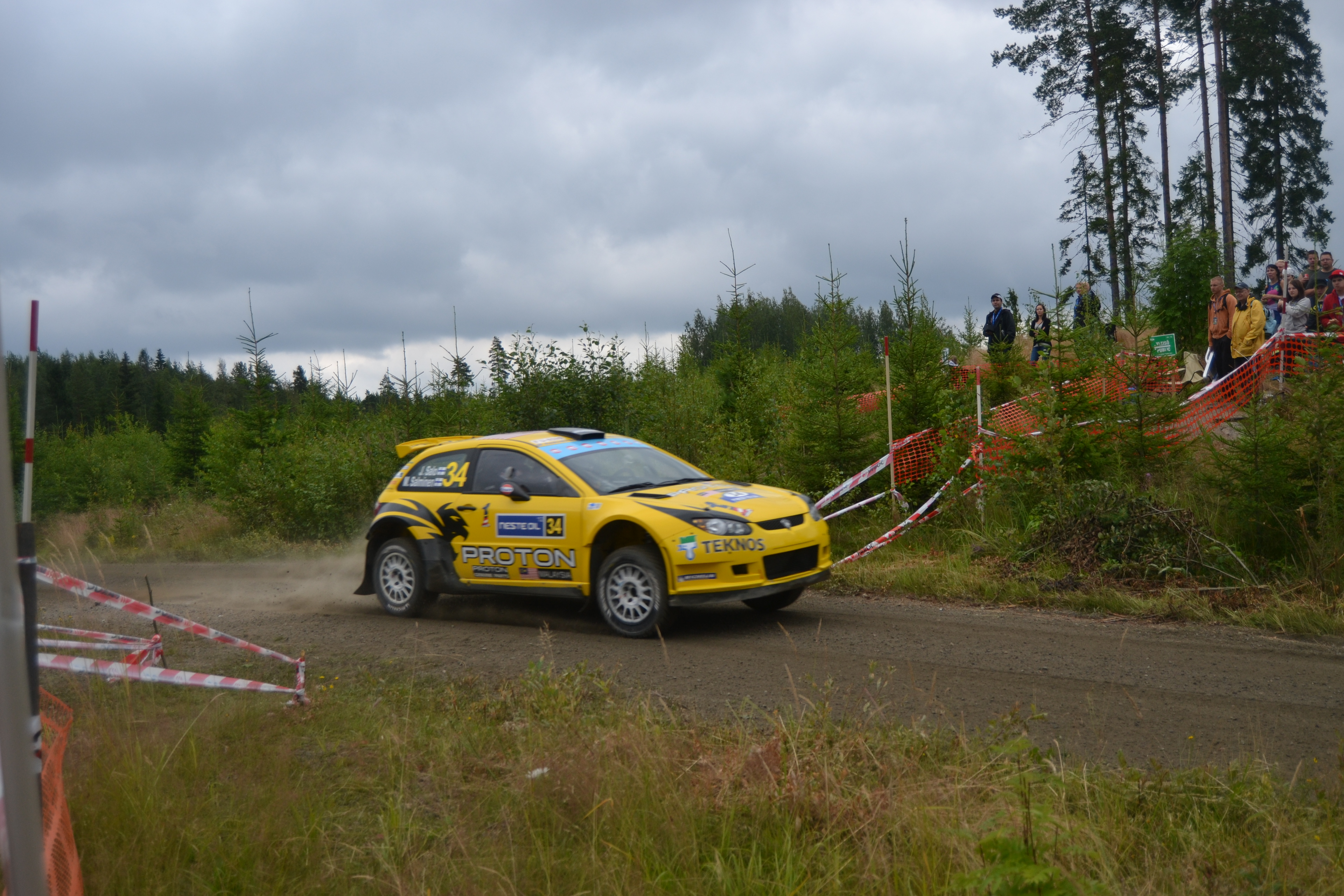

Personal information
- Nationality: (Finland) Finnish
- Born: October 10, 1978 (age 48)

World Rally Championship record
- Years active: 2008, 2011–2021, 2023–present
- Driver: (Finland) Jussi Tiippana (Finland) Juha Salo (Finland) Jukka Korhonen (Finland) Henri Haapamäki (Japan) Takamoto Katsuta (Finland) Teemu Suninen (Finland) Sami Pajari (Finland) Teemu Asunmaa (Japan) Nao Otake (Japan) Yuki Yamamoto
- Teams: M-Sport Ford WRT, Toyota Gazoo Racing WRT
- Rallies: 63
- Championships: 0
- Rally wins: 3
- Podiums: 9
- Stage wins: 7
- Total points: 138
- First rally: 2008 Rally Sweden
- First win: 2026 Rally Estonia
- Last win: 2026 Rally del Paraguay
- Last rally: 2026 Rally Italia Sardegna

Marko Salminen (born 10 October 1978) is a Finnish rally co-driver. He has been competing in the Junior World Rally Championship as the co-driver of Sami Pajari and in the Finnish Rally Championship alongside Teemu Asunmaa, Teemu Suninen and Valtteri Bottas. As announced on the 3 December 2024, Salminen returned to co-drive Sami Pajari 2025, driving for the Toyota Gazoo Racing WRC team in a GR Yaris Rally1 car.

== Rally career ==
Salminen began his rally career in the 2008 Rally Sweden, co-driving for Jussi Tiippana in a Subaru Impreza STi N12.

Starting from 2019 season, Salminen partnered with Teemu Suninen in M-Sport Ford WRT. Before the season began, the Finnish crew made their debut cooperation in the 2018 Monza Rally Show, where they finished as the runner-up, just behind the MotoGP legend Valentino Rossi.

In Corsica, Salminen scored his first WRC points, finishing fifth overall. Only days before the start of Rally Sardinia 2019, Salminen was replaced as co-driver for Suninen in favour of the more experienced Jarmo Lehtinen.

Salminen was the co-driver of Sami Pajari in 2020 Junior WRC, and is set to resume their partnership from 2024 onwards.

== Rally victories ==
=== WRC victories ===
#	Event	Season	Driver	Car	Ref.
1	2026 Rally Estonia	2026	(Finland) Sami Pajari	Toyota GR Yaris Rally1	
2	2026 Rally Finland	2026	(Finland) Sami Pajari	Toyota GR Yaris Rally1	
3	2026 Rally del Paraguay	2026	(Finland) Sami Pajari	Toyota GR Yaris Rally1	

== Rally results ==
=== WRC results ===
Year	Entrant	Car	1	2	3	4	5	6	7	8	9	10	11	12	13	14	15	WDC	Points
2008	Motoring Club	Subaru Impreza STi N14	MON	SWE; 27	MEX	ARG	JOR	ITA	GRE	TUR								NC	0
2008	Subaru Rally Team USA	Subaru Impreza STi N14									FIN; 24	GER	NZL	ESP	FRA	JPN	GBR	NC	0
2011	Juha Salo	Mitsubishi Lancer Evolution X	SWE	MEX	POR	JOR	ITA; 30	ARG	GRE									NC	0
2011	Juha Salo	Mitsubishi Lancer Evolution X R4								FIN; 35	GER	AUS	FRA	ESP	GBR			NC	0
2012	Proton Motorsports	Proton Satria Neo S2000	MON	SWE	MEX	POR	ARG	GRE	NZL	FIN; 18	GER	GBR	FRA	ITA	ESP			NC	0
2013	Hannu's Rally Team	Subaru Impreza STi R4	MON	SWE	MEX	POR	ARG	GRE	ITA; 14	FIN	GER	AUS	FRA	ESP				NC	0
2013	ADAC Weser-Ems	Citroën DS3 R3T													GBR; 28			NC	0
2014	Henri Haapamäki	Citroën C2 R2	MON	SWE	MEX	POR	ARG	ITA	POL	FIN; 15	GER	AUS	FRA	ESP				NC	0
2014	Hannu's Rally Team	Citroën DS3 R3T													GBR; 31			NC	0
2015	Hannu's Rally Team	Citroën DS3 R3T Max	MON	SWE	MEX	ARG	POR; 30	ITA	POL; 28	FIN; 19	GER	AUS	FRA	ESP	GBR			NC	0
2016	Juha Salo	Peugeot 208 T16	MON	SWE	MEX	ARG	POR	ITA	POL	FIN; Ret	GER	CHN; C	FRA	ESP	GBR	AUS		NC	0
2017	Tommi Mäkinen Racing	Ford Fiesta R5	MON	SWE; 22	MEX	FRA	ARG	POR; 36	ITA; 14	POL	FIN; Ret	GER	ESP; 51	GBR	AUS			NC	0
2018	Tommi Mäkinen Racing	Ford Fiesta R5	MON	SWE; 11	MEX	FRA; 35	ARG	POR; 26	ITA; Ret	FIN; Ret	GER	TUR	GBR	ESP; 24	AUS			NC	0
2019	M-Sport Ford WRT	Ford Fiesta WRC	MON; 11	SWE; 23	MEX; Ret	FRA; 5	ARG; 7	CHL; 5	POR; 4	ITA	FIN	GER	TUR	GBR	ESP	AUS; C		12th	44
2020	Team Flying Finn	Ford Fiesta R2T	MON	SWE; 30	MEX	EST; 29	TUR	ITA; 44	MNZ; 71									NC	0
2021	Teemu Asunmaa	Škoda Fabia R5 Evo	MON	ARC; 13								FIN; Ret						NC	0
2021	Porvoon Autopalvelu	Ford Fiesta Rally4			CRO; 25	POR; 28	ITA	KEN	EST; 21	BEL; 21	GRE		ESP; 28	MNZ				NC	0
2023	Toyota Gazoo Racing WRT NG	Renault Clio Rally4	MON	SWE; 32	MEX	CRO	POR	ITA	KEN	EST	FIN; 43	GRE	CHL	EUR	JPN			NC	0
2024	Toyota Gazoo Racing WRT NG	Toyota GR Yaris Rally2	MON	SWE; 15	KEN	CRO; 29	POR; Ret	ITA; 60	POL	LAT	FIN; Ret	GRE	CHL	EUR	JPN; Ret			NC	0
2025	Toyota Gazoo Racing WRT2	Toyota GR Yaris Rally1	MON; Ret	SWE; 7	KEN; 4	ESP; Ret	POR; 7	ITA; 7	GRE; 46	EST; 7	FIN; 5	PAR; 6	CHL; 5	EUR; 6	JPN; 3	SAU; 4		8th	107
2026	Toyota Gazoo Racing WRT2	Toyota GR Yaris Rally1	MON; Ret	SWE; 3	KEN; 3	CRO; 2	ESP; 3	POR; 7	JPN; 3	GRE; 4	EST; 1	FIN; 1	PAR; 1	CHL; 4	ITA; 3			3rd	237

* Season still in progress.
