= Rally Saudi Arabia =

Saudi Arabian rallying competition

- Status: Ongoing
- Genre: Motorsporting event
- Frequency: Annual
- Location: Jeddah
- Country: Saudi Arabia
- Inaugurated: 2025
- Website: rally-saudiarabia.com

Rally Saudi Arabia is a rally competition headquartered in Jeddah. Signing a ten-year contract with WRC Promoter GmbH, the rally joined the World Rally Championship calendar from 2025.

== History ==
Saudi Arabia's bid to join the World Rally Championship could date back to 2023, when a candidate event was held. However, it missed out the 2024 calendar.

During the 2024 Rally Italia Sardegna, it was announced that the organisers of Rally Saudi Arabia signed a contract that would last a decade, meaning the rally would become a World Rally Championship event in 2025. The rally would be based in Jeddah, and was held as the finale of the season.

The 2026 edition was originally scheduled to serve as the final round of the World Rally Championship from 12-15 November. However, on 17 September 2026, the FIA and WRC Promoter announced that the event would be removed from the WRC calendar due to regional instability and associated logistical challenges. As a result, Rally Italia Sardegna became the final round of the 2026 championship. Rally Saudi Arabia remained scheduled to take place as a part of the FIA Middle East Rally Championship. The rally was subsequently included in the 2027 World Rally Championship calendar, once again as the season finale.

== Winners ==
Season	Driver	Co-driver	Team	Car	Tyre	Category	Report	Ref
2025	(Belgium) Thierry Neuville	(Belgium) Martijn Wydaeghe	(South Korea) Hyundai Shell Mobis WRT	Hyundai i20 N Rally1	H	WRC	Report	
2026						MERC	Report	
