= Central European Rally =

Rally competition between multiple countries

- Status: Active
- Genre: Motorsport
- Frequency: Annual
- Locations: Passau, Bavaria, Germany
- Country: Germany; Austria; Czech Republic
- Inaugurated: 2023
- Most recent: 2025
- Website: centraleuropeanrally.eu

The Central European Rally was a European rally competition held over 4 days that debuted during the 2023 World Rally Championship season, co-hosted between Germany, Austria and Czech Republic. The rally is based in southeast Germany, in the city of Passau in Bavaria, and is run on tarmac.

== Winners ==
Season	Driver	Co-driver	Team	Car	Tyre	Event report	Championship	Ref
2023	(Belgium) Thierry Neuville	(Belgium) Martijn Wydaeghe	(South Korea) Hyundai Shell Mobis WRT	Hyundai i20 N Rally1	P	Report	WRC	
2024	(Estonia) Ott Tänak	(Estonia) Martin Järveoja	(South Korea) Hyundai Shell Mobis WRT	Hyundai i20 N Rally1	P	Report	WRC	
2025	(Finland) Kalle Rovanperä	(Finland) Jonne Halttunen	(Japan) Toyota Gazoo Racing WRT	Toyota GR Yaris Rally1	H	Report	WRC	

== See also ==
- Czech Republic–Germany border
- Austria–Germany border
