= 2023 Central European Rally =

1st edition of Central European Rally

2023 Central European Rally Central Europe Rally 2023
Round 12 of 13 in the 2023 World Rally Championship
← Previous event	Next event →
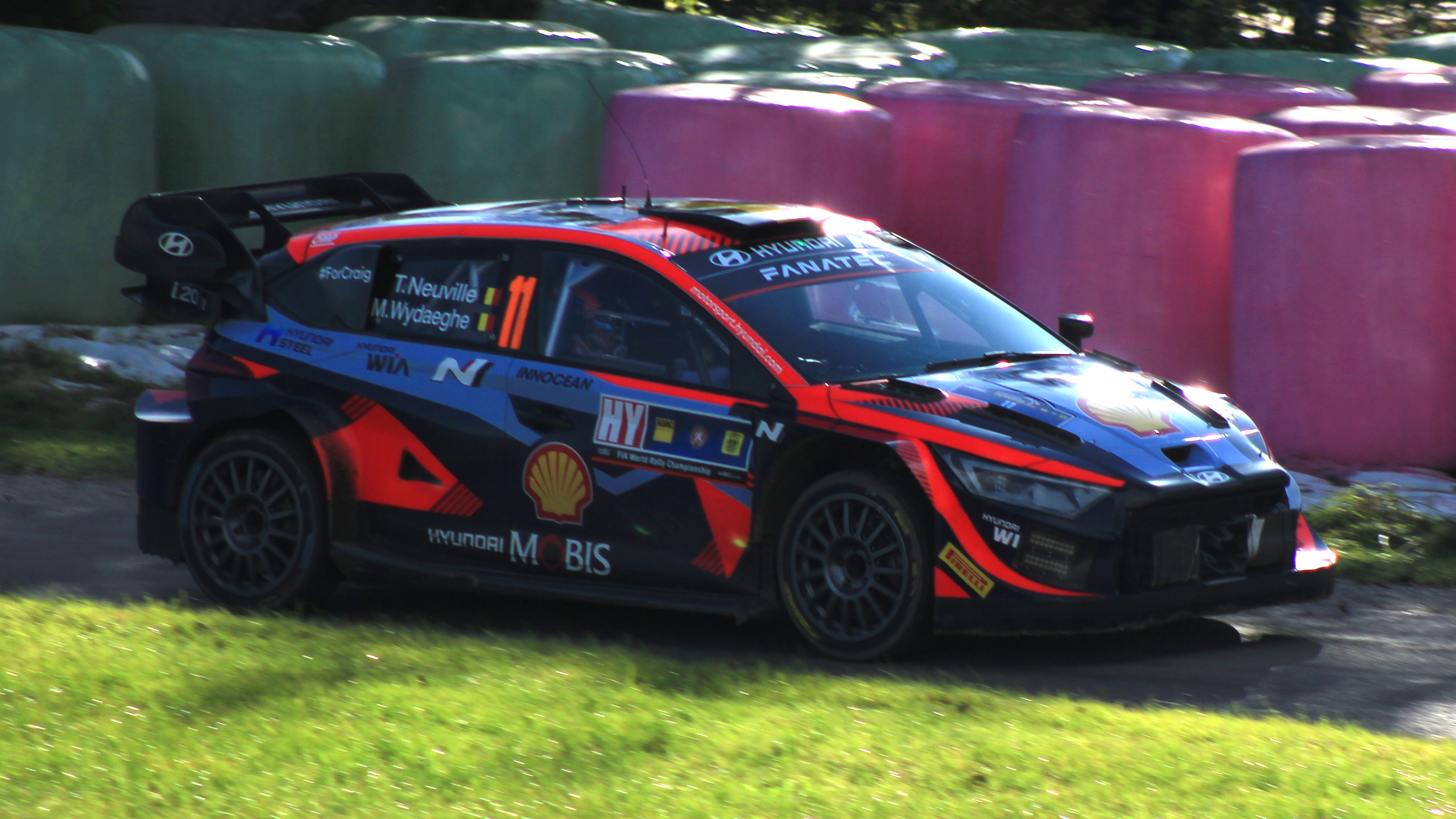
- Rally winners Thierry Neuville and Martijn Wydaeghe during the event.
- Host country: Czech Republic (leg 1); Austria (leg 2 & 3); Germany (leg 2 & 3)
- Rally base: Passau, Bavaria, Germany
- Dates run: 26 – 29 October 2023
- Start location: Velká Chuchle, Prague, Czech Republic
- Finish location: Passau, Bavaria, Germany
- Stages: 18 (311.79 km; 193.74 miles)
- Stage surface: Tarmac
- Transport distance: 1,355.29 km (842.14 miles)
- Overall distance: 1,667.08 km (1,035.88 miles)

Statistics
- Crews registered: 68
- Crews: 67 at start, 54 at finish

Overall results
- Overall winner: (Belgium) Thierry Neuville (Belgium) Martijn Wydaeghe (South Korea) Hyundai Shell Mobis WRT; 2:52:39.9
- Power Stage winner: (United Kingdom) Elfyn Evans (United Kingdom) Scott Martin (Japan) Toyota Gazoo Racing WRT; 8:42.3

Support category results
- WRC-2 winner: (France) Nicolas Ciamin (France) Yannick Roche; 3:04:33.0
- WRC-3 winner: (Czech Republic) Filip Kohn (United Kingdom) Tom Woodburn; 3:23:04.4

The 2023 Central European Rally (also known as the Central Europe Rally 2023) was a motor racing event for rally cars which was held from 26 to 29 October 2023. It marked the first running of the Central European Rally, and was the twelfth round of the 2023 World Rally Championship, World Rally Championship-2 and World Rally Championship-3. The event was based in Passau, Bavaria, Germany, and was contested over eighteen special stages covering a total competitive distance of 311.79 km (193.74 mi).

Thierry Neuville and Martijn Wydaeghe won their second rally of the season. Their team, Hyundai Shell Mobis WRT, were the manufacturer's winners. Kalle Rovanperä and Jonne Halttunen became the 2023 World Rally Champions after finishing second. Nicolas Ciamin and Yannick Roche won the World Rally Championship-2 category, while Andreas Mikkelsen and Torstein Eriksen won the 2023 WRC-2 title. Filip Kohn and Tom Woodburn won the World Rally Championship-3 category.

== Background ==
=== Entry list ===
The following crews entered into the rally. The event was opened to crews competing in the World Rally Championship, its support categories, the World Rally Championship-2, World Rally Championship-3 and privateer entries that were not registered to score points in any championship. Ten entered under Rally1 regulations, as were thirty-one Rally2 crews in the World Rally Championship-2 and three Rally3 crews in the World Rally Championship-3.

Rally1 entries competing in the World Rally Championship
No.	Driver	Co-Driver	Entrant	Car	Championship eligibility	Tyre
3	(Finland) Teemu Suninen	(Finland) Mikko Markkula	(South Korea) Hyundai Shell Mobis WRT	Hyundai i20 N Rally1	Driver, Co-driver, Manufacturer	P
4	(Finland) Esapekka Lappi	(Finland) Janne Ferm	(South Korea) Hyundai Shell Mobis WRT	Hyundai i20 N Rally1	Driver, Co-driver, Manufacturer	P
7	(France) Pierre-Louis Loubet	(France) Benjamin Veillas	(United Kingdom) M-Sport Ford WRT	Ford Puma Rally1	Driver, Co-driver, Manufacturer	P
8	(Estonia) Ott Tänak	(Estonia) Martin Järveoja	(United Kingdom) M-Sport Ford WRT	Ford Puma Rally1	Driver, Co-driver, Manufacturer	P
11	(Belgium) Thierry Neuville	(Belgium) Martijn Wydaeghe	(South Korea) Hyundai Shell Mobis WRT	Hyundai i20 N Rally1	Driver, Co-driver, Manufacturer	P
13	(Luxembourg) Grégoire Munster	(Belgium) Louis Louka	(United Kingdom) M-Sport Ford WRT	Ford Puma Rally1	Driver, Co-driver	P
17	(France) Sébastien Ogier	(France) Vincent Landais	(Japan) Toyota Gazoo Racing WRT	Toyota GR Yaris Rally1	Driver, Co-driver, Manufacturer	P
18	(Japan) Takamoto Katsuta	(Republic of Ireland) Aaron Johnston	(Japan) Toyota Gazoo Racing WRT	Toyota GR Yaris Rally1	Driver, Co-driver	P
33	(United Kingdom) Elfyn Evans	(United Kingdom) Scott Martin	(Japan) Toyota Gazoo Racing WRT	Toyota GR Yaris Rally1	Driver, Co-driver, Manufacturer	P
69	(Finland) Kalle Rovanperä	(Finland) Jonne Halttunen	(Japan) Toyota Gazoo Racing WRT	Toyota GR Yaris Rally1	Driver, Co-driver, Manufacturer	P

Rally2 entries competing in the World Rally Championship-2
No.	Driver	Co-Driver	Entrant	Car	Championship eligibility	Tyre
20	(Norway) Andreas Mikkelsen	(Norway) Torstein Eriksen	(Germany) Toksport WRT 3	Škoda Fabia RS Rally2	Driver, Co-driver, Team	P
21	(France) Yohan Rossel	(France) Arnaud Dunand	(France) PH Sport	Citroën C3 Rally2	Driver, Co-driver	P
22	(United Kingdom) Gus Greensmith	(Sweden) Jonas Andersson	(Germany) Toksport WRT 3	Škoda Fabia RS Rally2	Driver, Co-driver, Team	P
23	(Finland) Sami Pajari	(Finland) Enni Mälkönen	(Germany) Toksport WRT 2	Škoda Fabia RS Rally2	Team	P
25	Nikolay Gryazin (Note: Nikolay Gryazin is Russian, but he competes as a neutral competitor using the ANA flag as Russian national emblems were banned by the association due to the Russian invasion of Ukraine.)	Konstantin Aleksandrov (Note: Konstantin Aleksandrov is Russian, but he competes as a neutral competitor using the ANA flag as Russian national emblems were banned by the association due to the Russian invasion of Ukraine.)	(Germany) Toksport WRT 2	Škoda Fabia RS Rally2	Challenger Driver, Challenger Co-driver, Team	P
26	(Poland) Kajetan Kajetanowicz	(Poland) Maciej Szczepaniak	(Poland) Kajetan Kajetanowicz	Škoda Fabia RS Rally2	Challenger Driver, Challenger Co-driver	P
27	(Finland) Emil Lindholm	(Finland) Reeta Hämäläinen	(South Korea) Hyundai Motorsport N	Hyundai i20 N Rally2	Driver, Co-driver, Team	P
28	(Poland) Mikołaj Marczyk	(Poland) Daniel Dymurski	(Poland) Mikołaj Marczyk	Škoda Fabia RS Rally2	Challenger Driver, Challenger Co-driver	P
29	(Finland) Lauri Joona	(Finland) Tuukka Shemeikka	(Finland) Lauri Joona	Škoda Fabia RS Rally2	Challenger Driver, Challenger Co-driver	—N/a
30	(Estonia) Georg Linnamäe	(United Kingdom) James Morgan	(Estonia) Georg Linnamäe	Hyundai i20 N Rally2	Challenger Driver, Challenger Co-driver	P
31	(Czech Republic) Erik Cais	(Czech Republic) Daniel Trunkát	(Czech Republic) Erik Cais	Škoda Fabia RS Rally2	Challenger Driver, Challenger Co-driver	P
32	(Republic of Ireland) Josh McErlean	(Republic of Ireland) James Fulton	(Republic of Ireland) Motorsport Ireland Rally Academy	Hyundai i20 N Rally2	Challenger Driver, Challenger Co-driver	P
34	(Paraguay) Fabrizio Zaldivar	(Italy) Marcelo Der Ohannesian	(South Korea) Hyundai Motorsport N	Hyundai i20 N Rally2	Challenger Driver, Challenger Co-driver, Team	P
35	(Spain) Alejandro Cachón	(Spain) Alejandro López	(Spain) Alejandro Cachón	Citroën C3 Rally2	Challenger Driver, Challenger Co-driver	P
36	(France) Nicolas Ciamin	(France) Yannick Roche	(France) Nicolas Ciamin	Škoda Fabia RS Rally2	Challenger Driver, Challenger Co-driver	P
37	(Finland) Roope Korhonen	(Finland) Anssi Viinikka	(Finland) Roope Korhonen	Škoda Fabia Rally2 evo	Challenger Driver, Challenger Co-driver	P
38	(Czech Republic) Jan Skála	(Czech Republic) Jiří Skořepa	(Czech Republic) Jan Skála	Hyundai i20 N Rally2	Challenger Driver, Challenger Co-driver	P
39	(Austria) Simon Wagner	(Austria) Gerald Winter	(Austria) Simon Wagner	Škoda Fabia RS Rally2	Challenger Driver, Challenger Co-driver	P
40	(Italy) Matteo Gamba	(Italy) Nicolò Gonella	(Italy) Matteo Gamba	Škoda Fabia RS Rally2	Challenger Driver, Challenger Co-driver	P
41	(Czech Republic) Adam Březík	(Czech Republic) Ondřej Krajča	(Czech Republic) Adam Březík	Škoda Fabia Rally2 evo	Challenger Driver, Challenger Co-driver	P
44	(Czech Republic) Štěpán Vojtěch	(Czech Republic) Michal Ernst	(Czech Republic) Štěpán Vojtěch	Škoda Fabia R5	Challenger Driver, Challenger Co-driver	P
45	(Germany) Albert von Thurn und Taxis	(Germany) Jara Hain	(Germany) Albert von Thurn und Taxis	Škoda Fabia RS Rally2	Challenger Driver, Challenger Co-driver	P
46	(Austria) Martin Roßgatterer	(Austria) Jürgen Heigl	(Austria) Martin Roßgatterer	Škoda Fabia Rally2 evo	Challenger Driver, Challenger Co-driver	P
47	(Czech Republic) Michal Horák	(Czech Republic) Ivan Horák	(Czech Republic) Michal Horák	Škoda Fabia R5	Challenger Driver, Challenger Co-driver	P
48	(Germany) Armin Kremer	(Germany) Ella Kremer	(Germany) Armin Kremer	Škoda Fabia RS Rally2	Challenger/Masters Driver, Challenger Co-driver	P
49	(Austria) Johannes Keferböck	(Austria) Ilka Minor	(Austria) Johannes Keferböck	Škoda Fabia RS Rally2	Challenger/Masters Driver, Challenger Co-driver	P
50	(Japan) Osamu Fukunaga	(Japan) Misako Saida	(Japan) Osamu Fukunaga	Škoda Fabia RS Rally2	Challenger/Masters Driver, Challenger Co-driver	P
51	(Republic of Ireland) Eamonn Boland	(Republic of Ireland) Michael Joseph Morrissey	(Republic of Ireland) Eamonn Boland	Citroën C3 Rally2	Challenger/Masters Driver, Challenger/Masters Co-driver	P
52	(Spain) Miguel Díaz-Aboitiz	(Spain) Rodrigo Sanjuan de Eusebio	(Spain) Miguel Díaz-Aboitiz	Škoda Fabia RS Rally2	Challenger/Masters Driver, Challenger Co-driver	P
53	(Italy) Filippo Marchino	(Italy) Pietro Ometto	(Italy) Filippo Marchino	Škoda Fabia R5	Challenger Driver, Challenger Co-driver	P
54	(Netherlands) Henk Vossen	(Netherlands) Radboud van Hoek	(Netherlands) Henk Vossen	Ford Fiesta Rally2	Challenger/Masters Driver, Challenger/Masters Co-driver	P

Rally3 entries competing in the World Rally Championship-3
No.	Driver	Co-Driver	Entrant	Car	Tyre
55	(Czech Republic) Filip Kohn	(United Kingdom) Tom Woodburn	(Czech Republic) Filip Kohn	Ford Fiesta Rally3	P
56	(Germany) Fabio Schwarz	(Austria) Bernhard Ettel	(Germany) Fabio Schwarz	Ford Fiesta Rally3	P
57	(Croatia) Martin Ravenščak	(Croatia) Dora Ravenščak	(Croatia) Marin Ravenščak	Ford Fiesta Rally3	P

Other major entries
No.	Driver	Co-Driver	Entrant	Car	Championship eligibility	Tyre
24	(France) Adrien Fourmaux	(France) Alexandre Coria	(United Kingdom) M-Sport Ford WRT	Ford Fiesta Rally2	—N/a	P
63	(Hungary) Zoltán László	(Hungary) Gábor Zsiros	(Hungary) Zoltán László	Škoda Fabia RS Rally2	Masters Driver	P

=== Route ===
The route was initially revealed in July 2023. The first leg would be competed in the Czech Republic, while the second and third leg would be run across Austria and Germany.

=== Itinerary ===
All dates and times are CEST (UTC+2) from 25 to 28 October 2023 and CET (UTC+1) on 29 October 2023.

Date	No.	Time span	Stage name	Distance
25 October	—	After 16:01	(Germany) Tittling [Shakedown]	3.38 km
26 October		After 13:00	(Czech Republic) Opening ceremony, Hradčany Square	—N/a
26 October	SS1	After 14:05	(Czech Republic) Velká Chuchle	2.37 km
26 October	SS2	After 18:05	(Czech Republic) Klatovy	8.92 km
26 October		20:45 – 21:33	(Germany) Flexi service A, Passau	—N/a
27 October		7:00 – 7:10	(Germany) Service B, Passau	—N/a
27 October	SS3	After 9:50	(Czech Republic) Vlachovo Březí 1	13.66 km
27 October	SS4	After 10:42	(Czech Republic) Zvotoky 1	23.81 km
27 October	SS5	After 12:15	(Czech Republic) Šumavské Hoštice 1	23.43 km
27 October		13:52 – 14:07	(Czech Republic) Tyre fitting zone, Prachatice	—N/a
27 October	SS6	After 14:32	(Czech Republic) Vlachovo Březí 2	13.66 km
27 October	SS7	After 15:24	(Czech Republic) Zvotoky 2	23.81 km
27 October	SS8	After 16:57	(Czech Republic) Šumavské Hoštice 2	23.43 km
27 October		19:22 – 20:10	(Germany) Flexi service C, Passau	—N/a
28 October		7:00 – 7:16	(Germany) Service D, Passau	—N/a
28 October	SS9	After 8:15	(Austria) Schärdinger Innviertel 1	16.02 km
28 October	SS10	After 10:01	(Austria) Mühltal 1	27.83 km
28 October	SS11	After 11:05	(Germany) Knaus Tabbert Bayerischer Wald 1	11.88 km
28 October		13:45 – 14:16	(Germany) Service E, Passau	—N/a
28 October	SS12	After 15:15	(Austria) Schärdinger Innviertel 2	16.02 km
28 October	SS13	After 17:01	(Austria) Mühltal 2	27.83 km
28 October	SS14	After 18:05	(Germany) Knaus Tabbert Bayerischer Wald 2	11.88 km
28 October		19:35 – 19:23	(Germany) Flexi service F, Passau	—N/a
29 October		6:30 – 6:46	(Germany) Service G, Passau	—N/a
29 October	SS15	After 8:15	(Austria) Böhmerwald 1	17.25 km
29 October		After 8:33	(Austria) Regroup, Ulrichsberg	—N/a
29 October	SS16	After 9:35	(Germany) Passauer Land 1	16.37 km
29 October	SS17	After 10:33	(Austria) Böhmerwald 2	17.25 km
29 October		After 11:01	(Austria) Regroup, Ulrichsberg	—N/a
29 October	SS18	After 12:15	(Germany) Passauer Land 2 [Power Stage]	16.37 km
29 October		After 14:30	(Germany) Official finish, Passau	—N/a

== Report ==
=== WRC Rally1 ===
==== Classification ====
Position		No.	Driver	Co-driver	Entrant	Car	Time	Difference	Points	
Event	Class	No.	Driver	Co-driver	Entrant	Car	Time	Difference	Event	Stage
1	1	11	Thierry Neuville	Martijn Wydaeghe	Hyundai Shell Mobis WRT	Hyundai i20 N Rally1	2:52:39.9	0.0	25	4
2	2	69	Kalle Rovanperä	Jonne Halttunen	Toyota Gazoo Racing WRT	Toyota GR Yaris Rally1	2:53:37.5	+57.6	18	0
3	3	8	Ott Tänak	Martin Järveoja	M-Sport Ford WRT	Ford Puma Rally1	2:54:32.7	+1:52.8	15	1
4	4	17	Sébastien Ogier	Vincent Landais	Toyota Gazoo Racing WRT	Toyota GR Yaris Rally1	2:54:48.5	+2:08.6	12	3
5	5	18	Takamoto Katsuta	Aaron Johnston	Toyota Gazoo Racing WRT	Toyota GR Yaris Rally1	2:55:28.2	+2:48.3	10	2
6	6	3	Teemu Suninen	Mikko Markkula	Hyundai Shell Mobis WRT	Hyundai i20 N Rally1	2:55:46.2	+3:06.3	8	0
7	7	13	Grégoire Munster	Louis Louka	M-Sport Ford WRT	Ford Puma Rally1	2:57:02.2	+4:22.3	4	0
10	8	7	Pierre-Louis Loubet	Benjamin Veillas	M-Sport Ford WRT	Ford Puma Rally1	3:04:44.2	+12:04.3	1	0
31	9	33	Elfyn Evans	Scott Martin	Toyota Gazoo Racing WRT	Toyota GR Yaris Rally1	3:32:38.1	+39:58.2	0	5
Retired SS5		4	Esapekka Lappi	Janne Ferm	Hyundai Shell Mobis WRT	Hyundai i20 N Rally1	Accident		0	0

==== Special stages ====
Stage	Winners	Car	Time	Class leaders
SD	Neuville / Wydaeghe	Hyundai i20 N Rally1	1:57.5	—N/a
SS1	Tänak / Järveoja	Ford Puma Rally1	1:51.2	Tänak / Järveoja
SS2	Neuville / Wydaeghe	Hyundai i20 N Rally1	4:14.7	Neuville / Wydaeghe
SS3	Rovanperä / Halttunen	Toyota GR Yaris Rally1	7:08.2	Neuville / Wydaeghe
SS4	Rovanperä / Halttunen	Toyota GR Yaris Rally1	12:30.8	Rovanperä / Halttunen
SS5	Rovanperä / Halttunen	Toyota GR Yaris Rally1	13:13.5	Rovanperä / Halttunen
SS6	Evans / Martin	Toyota GR Yaris Rally1	7:15.0	Rovanperä / Halttunen
SS7	Rovanperä / Halttunen	Toyota GR Yaris Rally1	12:55.5	Rovanperä / Halttunen
SS8	Neuville / Wydaeghe	Hyundai i20 N Rally1	13:46.5	Rovanperä / Halttunen
SS9	Evans / Martin	Toyota GR Yaris Rally1	8:17.4	Rovanperä / Halttunen
SS10	Neuville / Wydaeghe	Hyundai i20 N Rally1	16:06.7	Rovanperä / Halttunen
SS11	Neuville / Wydaeghe	Hyundai i20 N Rally1	7:38.4	Neuville / Wydaeghe
SS12	Ogier / Landais	Toyota GR Yaris Rally1	8:15.0	Neuville / Wydaeghe
SS13	Ogier / Landais	Toyota GR Yaris Rally1	16:24.2	Neuville / Wydaeghe
SS14	Rovanperä / Halttunen	Toyota GR Yaris Rally1	8:04.5	Neuville / Wydaeghe
SS15	Ogier / Landais	Toyota GR Yaris Rally1	8:14.4	Neuville / Wydaeghe
SS16	Evans / Martin	Toyota GR Yaris Rally1	8:36.5	Neuville / Wydaeghe
SS17	Ogier / Landais	Toyota GR Yaris Rally1	8:11.1	Neuville / Wydaeghe
SS18	Evans / Martin	Toyota GR Yaris Rally1	8:42.3	Neuville / Wydaeghe

==== Championship standings ====
- **Bold text** indicates 2023 World Champions.

Pos.	Drivers' championships			Co-drivers' championships			Manufacturers' championships		
Pos.	Move	Driver	Points	Move	Co-driver	Points	Move	Manufacturer	Points
1		**Kalle Rovanperä**	235		**Jonne Halttunen**	235		**Toyota Gazoo Racing WRT**	504
2		Elfyn Evans	191		Scott Martin	191		Hyundai Shell Mobis WRT	399
3		Thierry Neuville	184		Martijn Wydaeghe	184		M-Sport Ford WRT	271
4		Ott Tänak	162		Martin Järveoja	162			
5		Sébastien Ogier	114		Vincent Landais	114			

=== WRC-2 Rally2 ===
==== Classification ====
Position		No.	Driver	Co-driver	Entrant	Car	Time	Difference	Points		
Event	Class	No.	Driver	Co-driver	Entrant	Car	Time	Difference	Class	Stage	Event
9	1	36	Nicolas Ciamin	Yannick Roche	Nicolas Ciamin	Škoda Fabia RS Rally2	3:04:33.0	0.0	25	1	2
11	2	31	Erik Cais	Daniel Trunkát	Erik Cais	Škoda Fabia RS Rally2	3:05:05.7	+32.7	18	0	0
12	3	26	Kajetan Kajetanowicz	Maciej Szczepaniak	Kajetan Kajetanowicz	Škoda Fabia RS Rally2	3:06:39.9	+2:06.9	15	0	0
14	4	22	Gus Greensmith	Jonas Andersson	Toksport WRT 3	Škoda Fabia RS Rally2	3:07:34.6	+3:01.6	12	0	0
15	5	28	Mikołaj Marczyk	Daniel Dymurski	Mikołaj Marczyk	Škoda Fabia RS Rally2	3:08:07.5	+3:34.5	10	0	0
16	6	25	Nikolay Gryazin	Konstantin Aleksandrov	Toksport WRT 2	Škoda Fabia RS Rally2	3:08:32.0	+3:59.0	8	2	0
17	7	39	Simon Wagner	Gerald Winter	Simon Wagner	Škoda Fabia RS Rally2	3:09:04.1	+4:31.1	6	0	0
18	8	41	Adam Březík	Ondřej Krajča	Adam Březík	Škoda Fabia Rally2 evo	3:09:55.0	+5:22.0	4	0	0
19	9	34	Fabrizio Zaldivar	Marcelo Der Ohannesian	Hyundai Motorsport N	Hyundai i20 N Rally2	3:12:13.8	+7:40.8	2	0	0
20	10	48	Armin Kremer	Ella Kremer	Armin Kremer	Škoda Fabia RS Rally2	3:14:08.0	+9:35.0	1	0	0
21	11	44	Štěpán Vojtěch	Michal Ernst	Štěpán Vojtěch	Škoda Fabia R5	3:15:58.1	+11:25.1	0	0	0
22	12	46	Martin Roßgatterer	Jürgen Heigl	Martin Roßgatterer	Škoda Fabia Rally2 evo	3:17:19.7	+12:46.7	0	0	0
23	13	20	Andreas Mikkelsen	Torstein Eriksen	Toksport WRT 3	Škoda Fabia RS Rally2	3:17:57.2	+13:24.2	0	3	0
25	14	49	Johannes Keferböck	Ilka Minor	Johannes Keferböck	Škoda Fabia RS Rally2	3:24:01.0	+19:28.0	0	0	0
28	15	47	Michal Horák	Ivan Horák	Michal Horák	Škoda Fabia R5	3:28:37.5	+24:04.5	0	0	0
34	16	35	Alejandro Cachón	Alejandro López	Alejandro Cachón	Citroën C3 Rally2	3:41:12.7	+36:39.7	0	0	0
37	17	53	Filippo Marchino	Pietro Ometto	Filippo Marchino	Škoda Fabia R5	3:44:43.8	+40:10.8	0	0	0
43	18	52	Miguel Díaz-Aboitiz	Rodrigo Sanjuan de Eusebio	Miguel Díaz-Aboitiz	Škoda Fabia RS Rally2	3:54:24.4	+49:51.4	0	0	0
44	19	32	Josh McErlean	James Fulton	Motorsport Ireland Rally Academy	Hyundai i20 N Rally2	3:55:56.2	+51:23.2	0	0	0
46	20	45	Albert von Thurn und Taxis	Jara Hain	Albert von Thurn und Taxis	Škoda Fabia RS Rally2	3:58:30.5	+53:57.5	0	0	0
47	21	54	Henk Vossen	Radboud van Hoek	Henk Vossen	Ford Fiesta Rally2	4:03:34.4	+59:01.4	0	0	0
Retired SS16		30	Georg Linnamäe	James Morgan	Georg Linnamäe	Hyundai i20 N Rally2	Withdrawn		0	0	0
Retired SS16		38	Jan Skála	Jiří Skořepa	Jan Skála	Hyundai i20 N Rally2	Accident		0	0	0
Retired SS15		27	Emil Lindholm	Reeta Hämäläinen	Hyundai Motorsport N	Hyundai i20 N Rally2	Alternator		0	0	0
Retired SS10		50	Osamu Fukunaga	Misako Saida	Osamu Fukunaga	Škoda Fabia RS Rally2	Accident		0	0	0
Retired SS3		21	Yohan Rossel	Arnaud Dunand	PH Sport	Citroën C3 Rally2	Accident		0	0	0
Retired SS3		37	Roope Korhonen	Anssi Viinikka	Roope Korhonen	Škoda Fabia Rally2 evo	Administrative reasons		0	0	0
Retired SS3		40	Matteo Gamba	Nicolò Gonella	Matteo Gamba	Škoda Fabia RS Rally2	Administrative reasons		0	0	0
Retired SS3		51	Eamonn Boland	Michael Joseph Morrissey	Eamonn Boland	Citroën C3 Rally2	Administrative reasons		0	0	0
Did not start		29	Lauri Joona	Tuukka Shemeikka	Lauri Joona	Škoda Fabia RS Rally2	Withdrawn		0	0	0

==== Special stages ====
Overall
Stage	Winners	Car	Time	Class leaders
SD	Rossel / Dunand	Citroën C3 Rally2	2:06.7	—N/a
SS1	Mikkelsen / Eriksen	Škoda Fabia RS Rally2	1:55.0	Mikkelsen / Eriksen
SS2	Rossel / Dunand	Citroën C3 Rally2	4:35.0	Rossel / Dunand
SS3	Lindholm / Hämäläinen	Hyundai i20 N Rally2	7:39.6	Mikkelsen / Eriksen
SS4	Gryazin / Aleksandrov	Škoda Fabia RS Rally2	13:26.8	Lindholm / Hämäläinen
SS5	Gryazin / Aleksandrov	Škoda Fabia RS Rally2	14:09.7	Lindholm / Hämäläinen
SS6	Stage cancelled			
SS7	Ciamin / Roche	Škoda Fabia RS Rally2	13:48.9	Lindholm / Hämäläinen
SS8	Gryazin / Aleksandrov	Škoda Fabia RS Rally2	14:26.6	Lindholm / Hämäläinen
SS9	Ciamin / Roche	Škoda Fabia RS Rally2	8:51.5	Lindholm / Hämäläinen
SS10	Lindholm / Hämäläinen	Hyundai i20 N Rally2	17:16.2	Lindholm / Hämäläinen
SS11	Ciamin / Roche	Škoda Fabia RS Rally2	8:09.5	Lindholm / Hämäläinen
SS12	Greensmith / Andersson	Škoda Fabia RS Rally2	8:45.7	Lindholm / Hämäläinen
SS13	Lindholm / Hämäläinen	Hyundai i20 N Rally2	17:26.1	Lindholm / Hämäläinen
SS14	Lindholm / Hämäläinen	Hyundai i20 N Rally2	8:27.2	Lindholm / Hämäläinen
SS15	Ciamin / Roche	Škoda Fabia RS Rally2	8:49.9	Ciamin / Roche
SS16	Mikkelsen / Eriksen	Škoda Fabia RS Rally2	9:18.3	Ciamin / Roche
SS17	Gryazin / Aleksandrov	Škoda Fabia RS Rally2	8:43.6	Ciamin / Roche
SS18	Mikkelsen / Eriksen	Škoda Fabia RS Rally2	9:15.1	Ciamin / Roche

Challenger
Stage	Winners	Car	Time	Class leaders
SD	Gryazin / Aleksandrov	Škoda Fabia RS Rally2	2:08.9	—N/a
SS1	Marczyk / Dymurski	Škoda Fabia RS Rally2	1:55.2	Marczyk / Dymurski
SS2	Kajetanowicz / Szczepaniak	Škoda Fabia RS Rally2	4:37.9	Gryazin / Aleksandrov
SS3	Ciamin / Roche	Škoda Fabia RS Rally2	7:46.1	Ciamin / Roche
SS4	Gryazin / Aleksandrov	Škoda Fabia RS Rally2	13:26.8	Cais / Trunkát
SS5	Gryazin / Aleksandrov	Škoda Fabia RS Rally2	14:09.7	Cais / Trunkát
SS6	Stage cancelled			
SS7	Ciamin / Roche	Škoda Fabia RS Rally2	13.4839	Cais / Trunkát
SS8	Gryazin / Aleksandrov	Škoda Fabia RS Rally2	14:26.6	Cais / Trunkát
SS9	Ciamin / Roche	Škoda Fabia RS Rally2	8:51.5	Cais / Trunkát
SS10	Ciamin / Roche	Škoda Fabia RS Rally2	17:19.4	Ciamin / Roche
SS11	Ciamin / Roche	Škoda Fabia RS Rally2	8:09.5	Ciamin / Roche
SS12	Gryazin / Aleksandrov	Škoda Fabia RS Rally2	8:46.7	Ciamin / Roche
SS13	Gryazin / Aleksandrov	Škoda Fabia RS Rally2	17:27.3	Ciamin / Roche
SS14	Cais / Trunkát	Škoda Fabia RS Rally2	8:28.8	Ciamin / Roche
SS15	Ciamin / Roche	Škoda Fabia RS Rally2	8:49.9	Ciamin / Roche
SS16	Gryazin / Aleksandrov	Škoda Fabia RS Rally2	9:19.2	Ciamin / Roche
SS17	Gryazin / Aleksandrov	Škoda Fabia RS Rally2	8:43.6	Ciamin / Roche
SS18	Gryazin / Aleksandrov	Škoda Fabia RS Rally2	9:15.1	Ciamin / Roche

==== Championship standings ====
- **Bold text** indicates 2023 World Champions.

Pos.	Open Drivers' championships			Open Co-drivers' championships			Teams' championships			Challenger Drivers' championships			Challenger Co-drivers' championships		
Pos.	Move	Driver	Points	Move	Co-driver	Points	Move	Manufacturer	Points	Move	Manufacturer	Points	Move	Driver	Points
1		**Andreas Mikkelsen**	111		**Torstein Eriksen**	130	1	Toksport WRT 2	188		Sami Pajari	118		Enni Mälkönen	118
2	1	Gus Greensmith	111	1	Jonas Andersson	111	1	Toksport WRT 3	176		Kajetan Kajetanowicz	108		Maciej Szczepaniak	108
3	1	Yohan Rossel	104	1	Arnaud Dunand	104		M-Sport Ford WRT	146		Nikolay Gryazin	96		Konstantin Aleksandrov	96
4		Oliver Solberg	91		Elliott Edmondson	91		Toksport WRT	135	1	Mikołaj Marczyk	77		Szymon Gospodarczyk	65
5		Sami Pajari	86		Enni Mälkönen	86		Hyundai Motorsport N	128	1	Marco Bulacia	72		Diego Vallejo	62

=== WRC-3 Rally3 ===
==== Classification ====
Position		No.	Driver	Co-driver	Entrant	Car	Time	Difference	Points
Event	Class	No.	Driver	Co-driver	Entrant	Car	Time	Difference	Points
24	1	55	Filip Kohn	Tom Woodburn	Filip Kohn	Ford Fiesta Rally3	3:23:04.4	0.0	**25**
51	2	56	Fabio Schwarz	Bernhard Ettel	Fabio Schwarz	Ford Fiesta Rally3	4:24:35.4	+1:01:31.0	**18**
53	3	57	Martin Ravenščak	Dora Ravenščak	Martin Ravenščak	Ford Fiesta Rally3	5:15:43.8	+1:52:39.4	**15**

==== Special stages ====
Stage	Winners	Car	Time	Class leaders
SD	Kohn / Woodburn	Ford Fiesta Rally3	2:27.2	—N/a
SS1	Schwarz / Ettel	Ford Fiesta Rally3	2:05.8	Schwarz / Ettel
SS2	Kohn / Woodburn	Ford Fiesta Rally3	5:01.6	Kohn / Woodburn
SS3	Schwarz / Ettel	Ford Fiesta Rally3	8:36.6	Kohn / Woodburn
SS4	Schwarz / Ettel	Ford Fiesta Rally3	14:40.4	Kohn / Woodburn
SS5	Kohn / Woodburn	Ford Fiesta Rally3	15:19.1	Kohn / Woodburn
SS6	Stage cancelled			
SS7	Kohn / Woodburn	Ford Fiesta Rally3	14:45.4	Kohn / Woodburn
SS8	Kohn / Woodburn	Ford Fiesta Rally3	16:09.8	Kohn / Woodburn
SS9	Kohn / Woodburn	Ford Fiesta Rally3	9:56.7	Kohn / Woodburn
SS10	Kohn / Woodburn	Ford Fiesta Rally3	19:18.0	Kohn / Woodburn
SS11	Kohn / Woodburn	Ford Fiesta Rally3	10:27.6	Kohn / Woodburn
SS12	Kohn / Woodburn	Ford Fiesta Rally3	9:47.8	Kohn / Woodburn
SS13	Kohn / Woodburn	Ford Fiesta Rally3	19:24.4	Kohn / Woodburn
SS14	Kohn / Woodburn	Ford Fiesta Rally3	9:23.8	Kohn / Woodburn
SS15	Schwarz / Ettel	Ford Fiesta Rally3	9:35.6	Kohn / Woodburn
SS16	Schwarz / Ettel	Ford Fiesta Rally3	10:07.7	Kohn / Woodburn
SS17	Schwarz / Ettel	Ford Fiesta Rally3	9:27.5	Kohn / Woodburn
SS18	Schwarz / Ettel	Ford Fiesta Rally3	10:04.7	Kohn / Woodburn

==== Championship standings ====
- **Bold text** indicates 2023 World Champions.

Pos.	Drivers' championships			Co-drivers' championships		
Pos.	Move	Driver	Points	Move	Co-driver	Points
1		**Roope Korhonen**	100		**Anssi Viinikka**	100
2		Diego Dominguez Jr.	87		Rogelio Peñate	87
3		Tom Rensonnet	55		Loïc Dumont	55
4	10	Filip Kohn	52		Liam Regan	51
5	1	William Creighton	51		Conor Mohan	49

== Notes ==
Previous rally: 2023 Rally Chile	2023 FIA World Rally Championship	Next rally: 2023 Rally Japan
Previous rally: New event	2023 Central European Rally	Next rally: 2024 Central European Rally
