= 2023 World Rally Championship =

51st running of the World Rally Championship

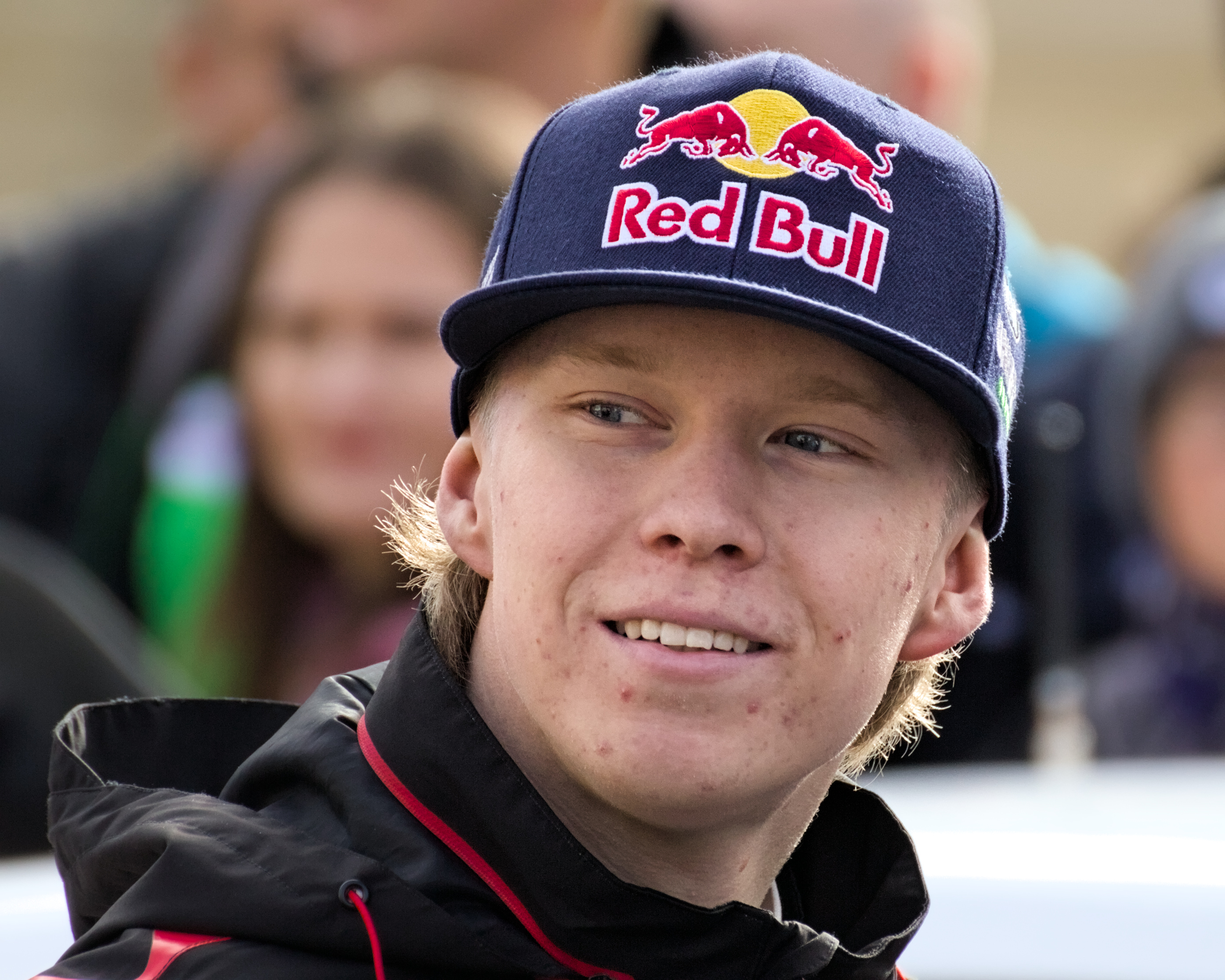
Kalle Rovanperä won his second drivers' championship title.

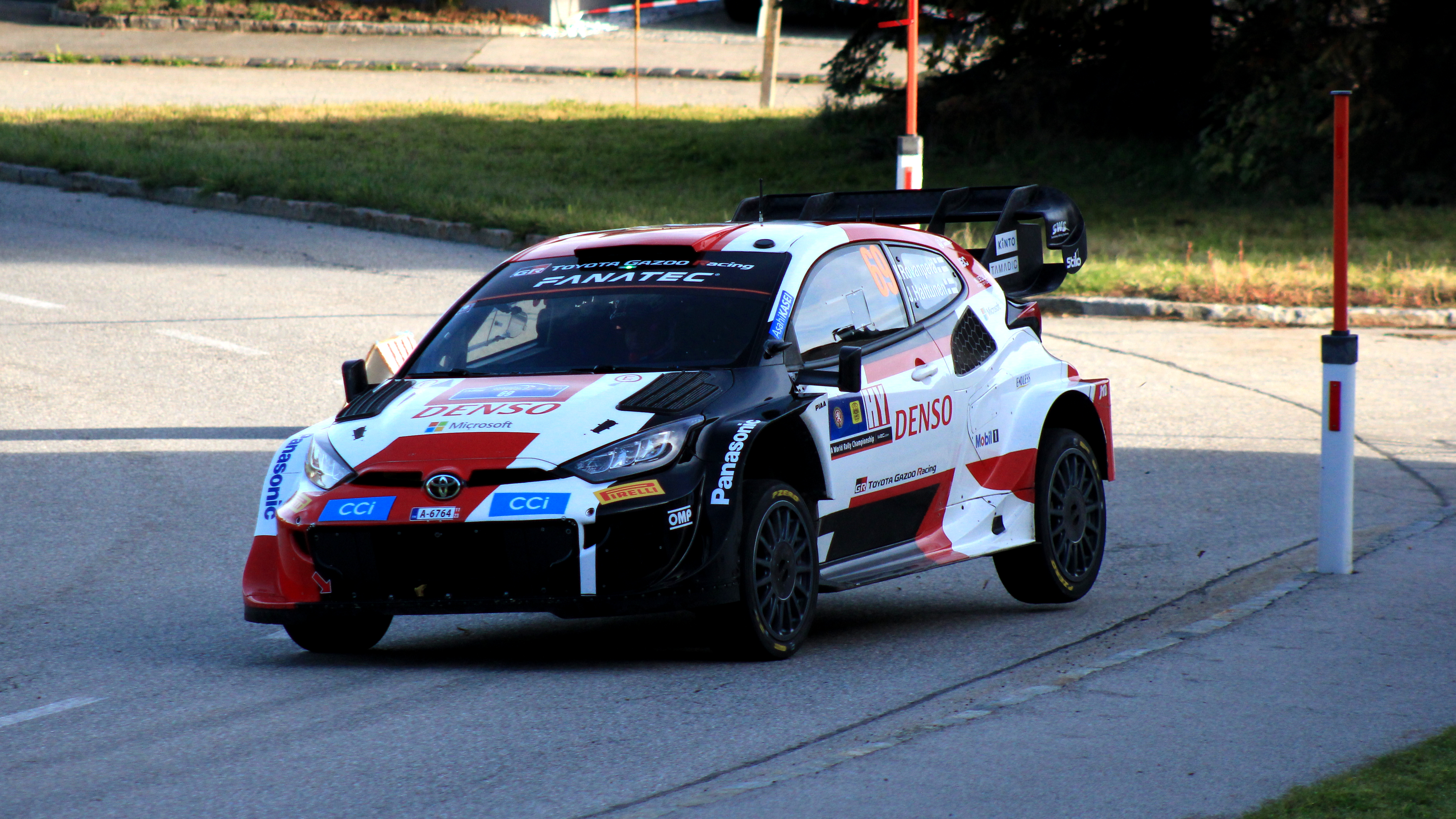
Toyota Gazoo Racing WRT (GR Yaris Rally1 pictured) were the manufacturers' champions.

The 2023 FIA World Rally Championship was the 51st season of the World Rally Championship, an international rallying series organised by the Fédération Internationale de l'Automobile (FIA) and WRC Promoter GmbH. Teams and crews competed for the World Rally Championships for Drivers, Co-drivers and Manufacturers. Crews were free to compete in cars complying with Groups Rally1 to Rally5 regulations; however, only manufacturers competing with Rally1 cars homologated were eligible to score points in the manufacturers' championship. The championship began in January 2023 with the Monte Carlo Rally and concluded in November 2023 with the Rally Japan. The series was supported by WRC2 and WRC3 categories at every round of the championship and by the Junior WRC at selected events.

Kalle Rovanperä and Jonne Halttunen were the reigning drivers' and co-drivers' champions, having secured their first championship titles at the 2022 Rally New Zealand. Toyota were the defending manufacturers' champions.

At the conclusion of the championship, Rovanperä and Halttunen won their second World Rally Championship titles at the 2023 Central European Rally. Elfyn Evans and Scott Martin were second, trailing by thirty-four points. Thierry Neuville and Martijn Wydaeghe were third, a further twenty-seven points behind. In the manufacturers' championship, Toyota Gazoo Racing WRT successfully defended their title at the 2023 Rally Chile, holding over-one-hundred-point lead over Hyundai Shell Mobis WRT, with M-Sport Ford WRT in third.

The season was marred by the death of Craig Breen in a pre-event test prior to the 2023 Croatia Rally.

== Calendar ==
A map showing the locations of the rallies in the 2023 championship. Event headquarters are marked with black dots.

The 2023 season was contested over thirteen rounds crossing Europe, Africa, North and South America, and Asia.

| Round | Start date | Finish date | Rally | Rally headquarters | Surface | Stages | Distance | Ref. |
|---|---|---|---|---|---|---|---|---|
| 1 | 19 January | 22 January | (Monaco) Rallye Automobile Monte Carlo | Monte Carlo, Monaco | Mixed (Note: The Monte Carlo Rally is run on a tarmac and snow surface.) | 18 | 325.02 km | |
| 2 | 9 February | 12 February | Rally Sweden | Umeå, Västerbotten County, Sweden | Snow | 18 | 301.18 km | |
| 3 | 16 March | 19 March | (Mexico) Rally Guanajuato México | León, Guanajuato, Mexico | Gravel | 23 | 315.69 km | |
| 4 | 20 April | 23 April | Croatia Rally | Zagreb, Croatia | Tarmac | 20 | 301.26 km | |
| 5 | 11 May | 14 May | Rally de Portugal | Matosinhos, Porto, Portugal | Gravel | 19 | 329.06 km | |
| 6 | 1 June | 4 June | (Italy) Rally Italia Sardegna | Olbia, Sardinia, Italy | Gravel | 19 | 322.88 km | |
| 7 | 22 June | 25 June | Safari Rally Kenya | Naivasha, Nakuru County, Kenya | Gravel | 19 | 355.92 km | |
| 8 | 20 July | 23 July | Rally Estonia | Tartu, Estonia | Gravel | 21 | 300.41 km | |
| 9 | 3 August | 6 August | Rally Finland | Jyväskylä, Central Finland, Finland | Gravel | 22 | 320.56 km | |
| 10 | 7 September | 10 September | Acropolis Rally Greece | Lamia, Central Greece, Greece | Gravel | 15 | 270.89 km | |
| 11 | 28 September | 1 October | Rally Chile | Concepción, Biobío, Chile | Gravel | 16 | 321.06 km | |
| 12 | 26 October | 29 October | (Europe) Central European Rally | Passau, Bavaria, Germany | Tarmac | 18 | 310.01 km | |
| 13 | 16 November | 19 November | Rally Japan | Toyota, Aichi, Japan | Tarmac | 22 | 304.66 km | |

=== Calendar changes ===
The championship was expected to be expanded to fourteen rounds from the thirteen rounds in the previous season by WRC Promoter GmbH, with eight Europe-based rallies and six fly-away events covering the season. However, when the calendar was released in late November following a lengthy delay, the number of the events was reduced to thirteen with the anticipated Saudi Arabian rally based at Jeddah, absent from the calendar.

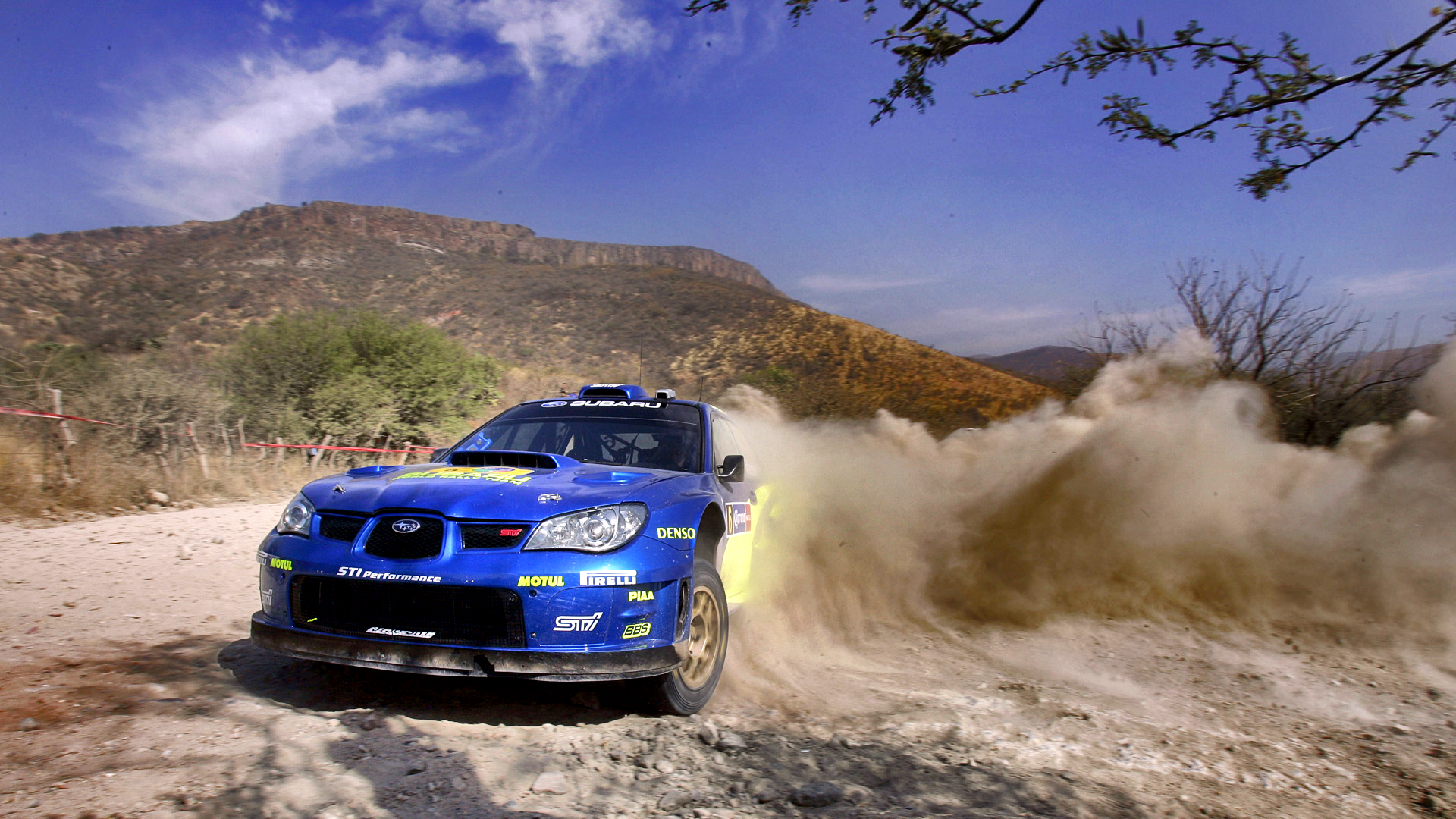
Rally Mexico (pictured in 2008 with a Subaru Impreza WRC) returned to the calendar.

- Rally Mexico returned to championship after missing the 2021 and 2022 championships. The organizers of the rally had previously held a national event in 2022 as a prelude for the 2023 return.
- Rally Chile rejoined the calendar after having been ruled out in 2020 and 2021 due to the Chilean protests and COVID-19 pandemic respectively.
- The Central European Rally, a tri-nation event held across Germany, Austria and the Czech Republic, was introduced into the championship, replacing the Catalonian Rally. The rally was based out of southeast Germany, in the city of Passau in Bavaria, and ran on tarmac.
- Rally New Zealand, a round of the 2022 season, was not included on the calendar, but the organizers tried to seek an opportunity for a 2024 return as a part of the rotation program with Rally Australia.
- Ypres Rally Belgium, which was a part of the championship for the prior two seasons, dropped off the calendar and instead formed part of the 2023 British Rally Championship.

Several rally organizers also expressed their interests to return to the championship, including Rally Argentina, Rally Australia, the German Rally, and an event in Northern Ireland. The Argentine, Australian and Northern Irish bids failed and Germany organized the Central European Rally along with Austria and the Czech Republic. In addition to the candidate events, the WRC Promoter GmbH was also working on the calendar expansion to the Middle East and United States, but no rallies were added for the 2023 season.

=== Location changes ===
- The headquarters of the Rally Italia Sardegna would be once again moved from Alghero to Olbia. The 2020 event was previously headquartered in Olbia as a result of major route revisions due to the COVID-19 pandemic.
- The 2023 edition of the Safari Rally was headquartered at the Lakeside town of Naivasha. The rally was previously headquartered in the Kenyan capital Nairobi.

== Entrants ==
The following teams, drivers and co-drivers contested the championship under Rally1 regulations. All crews use tyres provided by Pirelli.

Rally1 entries eligible to score manufacturer points
| Manufacturer | Entrant | Car | No. | Driver name | Co-driver name | Rounds |
|---|---|---|---|---|---|---|
| Ford | (United Kingdom) M-Sport Ford WRT | Ford Puma Rally1 | 7 | (France) Pierre-Louis Loubet | (Belgium) Nicolas Gilsoul | 1–11 |
| Ford | (United Kingdom) M-Sport Ford WRT | Ford Puma Rally1 | 7 | (France) Pierre-Louis Loubet | (France) Benjamin Veillas | 12 |
| Ford | (United Kingdom) M-Sport Ford WRT | Ford Puma Rally1 | 8 | (Estonia) Ott Tänak | (Estonia) Martin Järveoja | All |
| Ford | (United Kingdom) M-Sport Ford WRT | Ford Puma Rally1 | 16 | (France) Adrien Fourmaux | (France) Alexandre Coria | 13 |
| Hyundai | (South Korea) Hyundai Shell Mobis WRT | Hyundai i20 N Rally1 | 3 | (Finland) Teemu Suninen | (Finland) Mikko Markkula | 8–9, 11–12 |
| Hyundai | (South Korea) Hyundai Shell Mobis WRT | Hyundai i20 N Rally1 | 4 | (Finland) Esapekka Lappi | (Finland) Janne Ferm | All |
| Hyundai | (South Korea) Hyundai Shell Mobis WRT | Hyundai i20 N Rally1 | 6 | (Spain) Dani Sordo | (Spain) Cándido Carrera | 1, 3, 5–7, 10, 13 |
| Hyundai | (South Korea) Hyundai Shell Mobis WRT | Hyundai i20 N Rally1 | 11 | (Belgium) Thierry Neuville | (Belgium) Martijn Wydaeghe | All |
| Hyundai | (South Korea) Hyundai Shell Mobis WRT | Hyundai i20 N Rally1 | 42 | (Republic of Ireland) Craig Breen | (Republic of Ireland) James Fulton | 2, 4 (Note: The crew of Craig Breen and James Fulton was registered for the 2023 Croatia Rally before Breen's fatal accident in the pre-event test.) |
| Toyota | (Japan) Toyota Gazoo Racing WRT | Toyota GR Yaris Rally1 | 17 | (France) Sébastien Ogier | (France) Vincent Landais | 1, 3–4, 6–7, 10, 12–13 |
| Toyota | (Japan) Toyota Gazoo Racing WRT | Toyota GR Yaris Rally1 | 18 | (Japan) Takamoto Katsuta | (Republic of Ireland) Aaron Johnston | 2, 5, 8–9, 11 |
| Toyota | (Japan) Toyota Gazoo Racing WRT | Toyota GR Yaris Rally1 | 33 | (United Kingdom) Elfyn Evans | (United Kingdom) Scott Martin | 1–3, 5–13 (Note: The crew of Elfyn Evans and Scott Martin was initially nominated to score manufacturer points at the 2023 Croatia Rally, but Toyota amended their championship eligibility to not score manufacturer points to match Hyundai and M-Sport following Breen's death ahead of the event as a mark of solidarity.) |
| Toyota | (Japan) Toyota Gazoo Racing WRT | Toyota GR Yaris Rally1 | 69 | (Finland) Kalle Rovanperä | (Finland) Jonne Halttunen | All |

The below crews were not entered to score manufacturer points and were entered in Rally1 cars as privateers or under arrangement with the manufacturers.

Rally1 entries ineligible to score manufacturer points
| Manufacturer | Entrant | Car | No. | Driver name | Co-driver name | Rounds |
|---|---|---|---|---|---|---|
| Ford | (United Kingdom) M-Sport Ford WRT | Ford Puma Rally1 | 9 | (Greece) Jourdan Serderidis | (Belgium) Frédéric Miclotte | 1, 3, 10 |
| Ford | (United Kingdom) M-Sport Ford WRT | Ford Puma Rally1 | 9 | (Greece) Jourdan Serderidis | (France) Andy Malfoy | 7 |
| Ford | (United Kingdom) M-Sport Ford WRT | Ford Puma Rally1 | 13 | (Luxembourg) Grégoire Munster | (Belgium) Louis Louka | 11–12 |
| Ford | (United Kingdom) M-Sport Ford WRT | Ford Puma Rally1 | 28 | (Chile) Alberto Heller | (Argentina) Luis Ernesto Allende | 11 |
| Toyota | (Japan) Toyota Gazoo Racing WRT | Toyota GR Yaris Rally1 | 18 | (Japan) Takamoto Katsuta | (Republic of Ireland) Aaron Johnston | 1, 3–4, 6–7, 10, 12–13 |
| Toyota | (Japan) Toyota Gazoo Racing WRT | Toyota GR Yaris Rally1 | 33 | (United Kingdom) Elfyn Evans | (United Kingdom) Scott Martin | 4 |
| Toyota | (Japan) Toyota Gazoo Racing WRT | Toyota GR Yaris Rally1 | 37 | (Italy) Lorenzo Bertelli | (Italy) Simone Scattolin | 2 |
| Toyota | (Japan) Toyota Gazoo Racing WRT | Toyota GR Yaris Rally1 | 97 | (Finland) Jari-Matti Latvala | (Finland) Juho Hänninen | 9 |

=== In detail ===
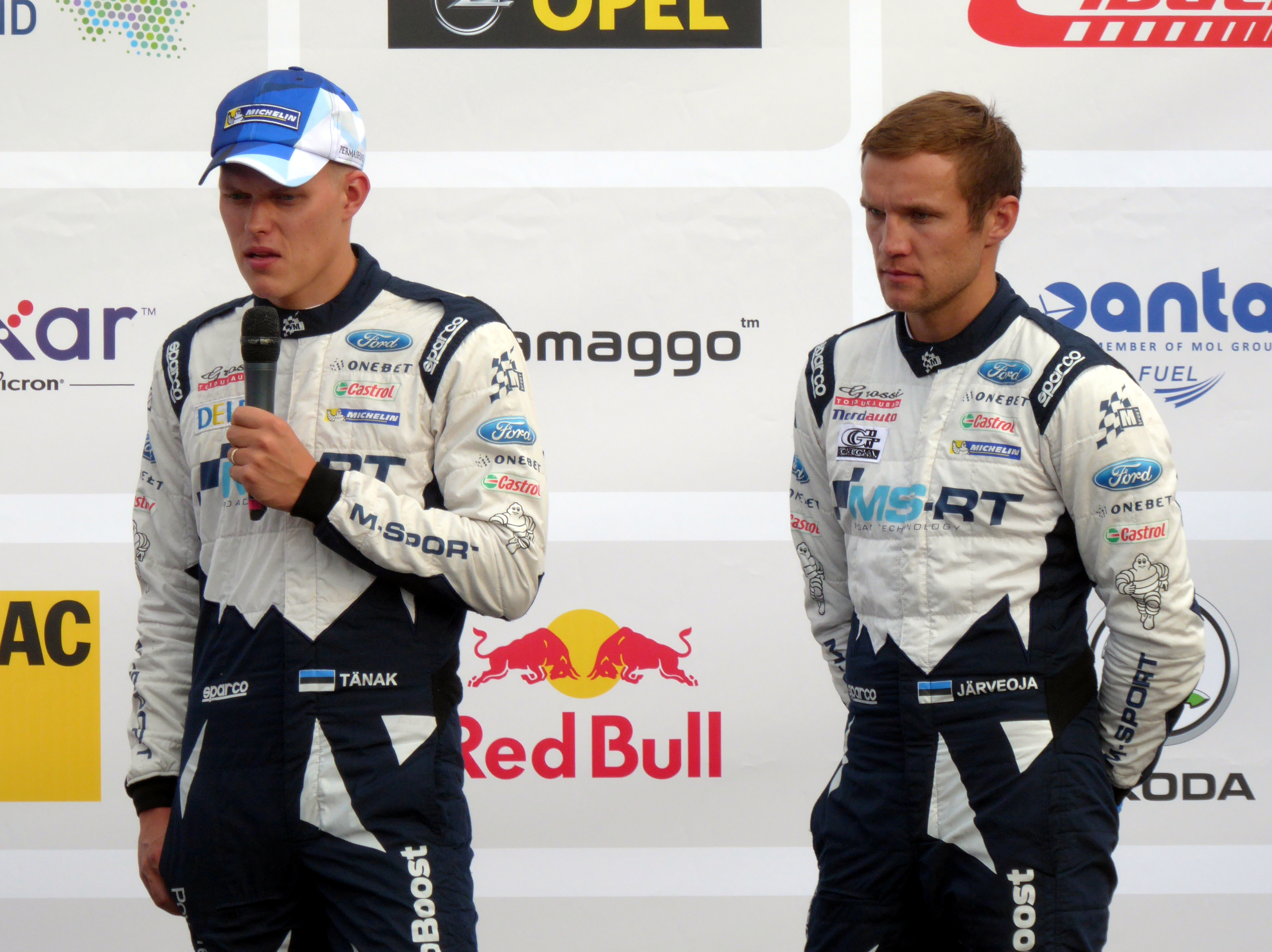
Ott Tänak (left) and Martin Järveoja (right) left Hyundai and returned to M-Sport.

M-Sport signed a full-year deal with Ott Tänak and Martin Järveoja after they terminated their multi-year contract with Hyundai. Pierre-Louis Loubet's programme with M-Sport was expanded, with Loubet entered every round as a manufacturer-registered points scorer. Nicolas Gilsoul, who was formerly Thierry Neuville's navigator, became Loubet's new co-driver. However, their partnership ended before the 2023 Central European Rally. Benjamin Veillas, the ex co-driver of Sébastien Ogier, replaced Gilsoul. Adrien Fourmaux, who drove as M-Sport's Rally1 entry in 2022, was demoted to the team's WRC2 program, though he would substitute for Loubet at the season finale. Jourdan Serderidis continued to drive a privately funded entry for the team at selected events. Chilean rally driver Alberto Heller made his debut at his home event with the team. So was the Luxembourgish driver Grégoire Munster at the event. Gus Greensmith left the team after eight years, and drove for Toksport in the WRC2 championship.

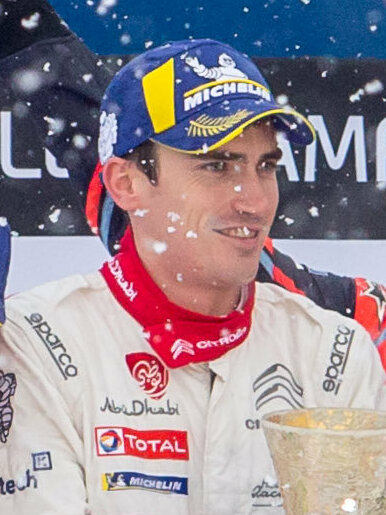
Craig Breen was killed in an accident ahead of the 2023 Croatia Rally.

Hyundai retained Neuville and Martijn Wydaeghe. They were joined by Esapekka Lappi and Janne Ferm as the team's full-time crews. Craig Breen, who had previously driven for Hyundai from 2019 to 2021, rejoined the team despite having a two-year contract with M-Sport. He shared the third car with Dani Sordo, who had previously planned to retire at the end of 2022 season. However, Breen died in an accident during a test before the 2023 Croatia Rally. The FIA subsequently announced that his car number 42 would be retired for the rest of the season. Teemu Suninen succeeded his position with co-driver Mikko Markkula. Oliver Solberg and Elliott Edmondson were dropped from the team. They moved to Toksport to compete the WRC2 category. Former Renault Formula One Team manager Cyril Abiteboul became Hyundai's new team boss.

Toyota retained the crews of Elfyn Evans and Scott Martin and of Kalle Rovanperä and Jonne Halttunen as their two full-time competitors. Rovanperä and Halttunen retained the car number 69 for the season, despite the no.1 plate being available to them as defending champions. Takamoto Katsuta and Aaron Johnston stepped up to the works team to share the third car with Ogier and Vincent Landais. The team's fourth car was made available for privately funded competitors when Ogier did not compete, the first of whom were Lorenzo Bertelli and Simone Scattolin at the 2023 Rally Sweden. Team principal Jari-Matti Latvala also made a one-off private return at the 2023 Rally Finland, which was announced after the Safari Rally.

== Regulation changes ==
Rally organisers can include an optional Tyre Warming Zone (TWZ) between the Time Control (TC) and the start of a Special Stage. The evening flexi-service for Rally1 cars was limited to a maximum of two hours every rally weekend. Morning service on gravel rallies was also removed.

The allocation of pre-event test days for the manufacturers was also reduced from 28 days to 21. This change was intended to reduce cost.

== Season report ==
=== Opening rounds ===
At the season opener at Monte Carlo, Ogier took his ninth Monte Carlo Rally win, surpassing Sébastien Loeb to become the driver with the most victories at the event. His navigator Landais took his first overall victory in a World Rally Championship round. The second round, Rally Sweden, saw Tänak and Järveoja take an early lead, before being surpassed by Breen and Fulton on Friday evening. However, Tänak and Järveoja fought back on Saturday evening, and eventually won the event. After being absent from Sweden, Ogier and Landais returned at Rally Mexico, where they took another victory after capitalizing on their relative late road position and led the championships, despite only competing in two of the three rounds.

"We promised the [Breen] family we'd enjoy the weekend, we've done that. I'm sure they were following us, but we're definitely thinking of you."

— Evans' comments at the end of the rally

Before the Croatia Rally, Hyundai driver Breen was killed during an accident at the pre-event test after the front-left of his i20 collided with a pole. His co-driver Fulton was unharmed. The rally was led by Neuville and Wydaeghe at early stage, but they crashing out on Saturday morning. Evans and Martin inherited the lead, and eventually won the rally, their first since the 2021 Rally Finland and dedicated the win to Breen.

=== Mid-season gravel events ===
The Portuguese Rally marked the start of a sequence of seven consecutive gravel events. Rovanperä and Halttunen dominated the rally, taking their first victory the season as well as winning the Power Stage to add a full thirty points to their championship defence. The Sardinian Rally saw a rainy weekend. Ogier and Landais fought for the lead until they went off the road on Saturday evening. This left the Hyundais of Neuville and Wydaeghe and of Lappi and Ferm out in front before they eventually secured a 1–2 finish for the team. Toyota responded with a 1–2–3–4 finish at the Safari Rally, (their third at the Safari Rally and fourth in the WRC), with Ogier and Landais claiming their third win of the season. Meanwhile, Neuville and Wydaeghe were disqualified from eighth place at the event, due to a reconnaissance breach, having already retired from two of Friday afternoon's stages with suspension damage.

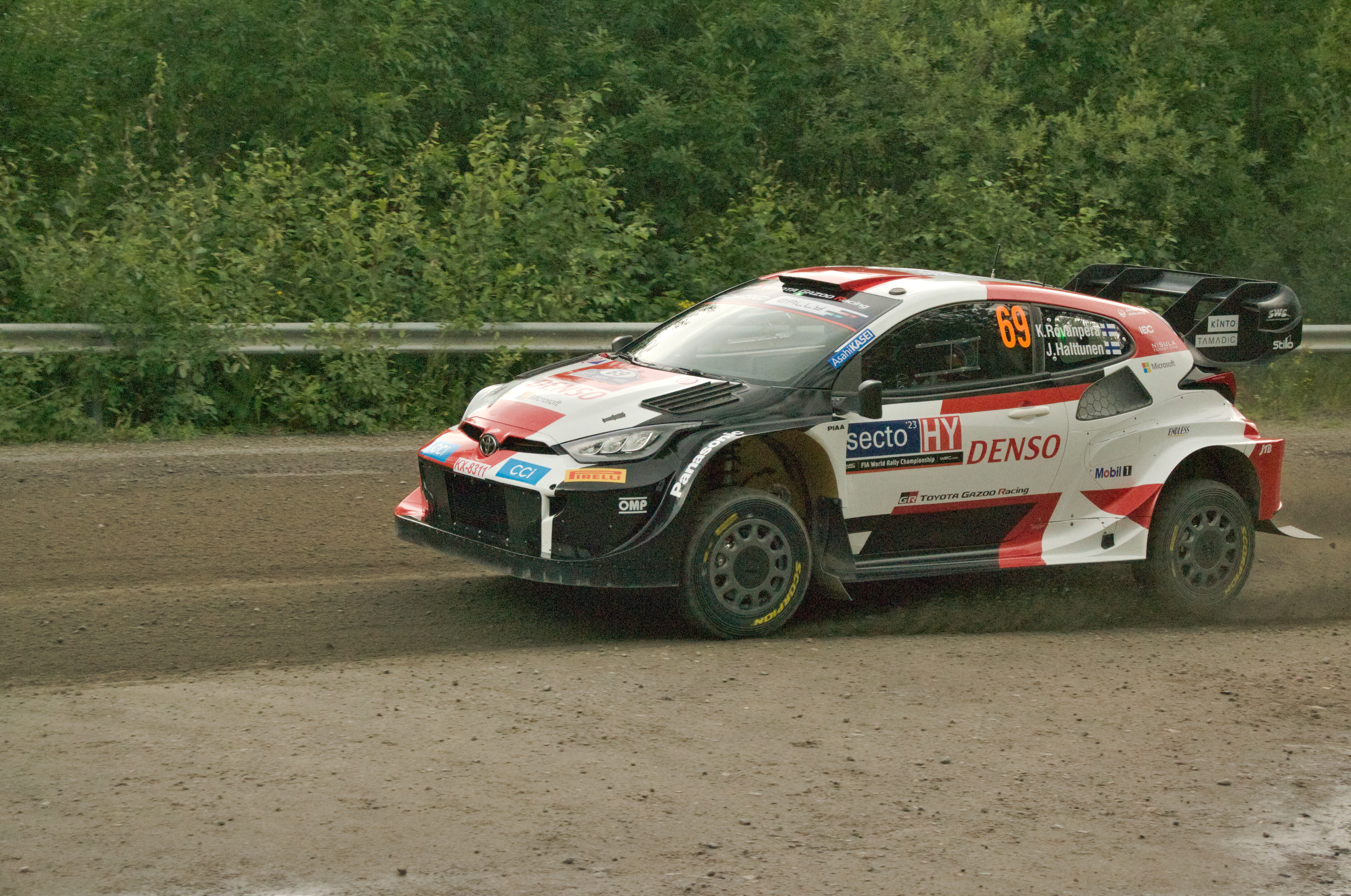
Kalle Rovanperä and Jonne Halttunen driving a Toyota GR Yaris Rally1 at the shakedown of the 2023 Rally Finland.

Heading into the second half of the season, Rovanperä and Halttunen did a Rally Estonia hat-trick, winning the rally as well as the Power Stage to extend their championship leads beyond fifty points. However, they retired from their home rally on the first day after they rolled their Yaris out of contention when leading the event. Evans and Martin capitalized on the opportunity to win the event and the Power Stage to cut the championship leads down to twenty-five points. The retirement did not stop Rovanperä and Halttunen from winning the following event at Greece and the respective Power Stage to score maximum points for the third time in 2023. On the other hand, the crew of Neuville and Wydaeghe retired from the rally with suspension damage, whilst the Finnish crew's other main championship rivals in Evans and Martin finished second, further solidifying Rovanperä and Halttunen's chances of securing a second consecutive world title. The final gravel event of the season at Chile, saw Toyota outscore Hyundai by more than thirteen points after Suninen and Markkula retired from second, which meant Toyota secured a third consecutive manufacturer's title. The rally was won by Tänak and Järveoja, their second of the season.

=== Closing rounds ===
At the calendar newcomer, the Central European Rally, Rovanperä and Halttunen finished second after title rival and teammates Evans and Martin crashed out on Saturday, which meant Rovanperä and Halttunen successfully defended their world titles. Meanwhile, Neuville and Wydaeghe won the rally, closing the gap to the second placed Evans and Martin in the championships. However, the battle for the runner-up spot was over when Neuville and Wydaeghe crashed out at the Rally Japan, meaning Evans and Martin became the crew who came out in front. They ended the season with a victory as a part of Toyota 1–2–3 finish.

== Results and standings ==
=== Season summary ===
| Round | Event | Winning driver | Winning co-driver | Winning entrant | Winning time | Report | Ref. |
|---|---|---|---|---|---|---|---|
| 1 | (Monaco) Rallye Automobile Monte Carlo | (France) Sébastien Ogier | (France) Vincent Landais | (Japan) Toyota Gazoo Racing WRT | 3:12:02.0 | Report | |
| 2 | Rally Sweden | (Estonia) Ott Tänak | (Estonia) Martin Järveoja | (United Kingdom) M-Sport Ford WRT | 2:25:54.5 | Report | |
| 3 | (Mexico) Rally Guanajuato México | (France) Sébastien Ogier | (France) Vincent Landais | (Japan) Toyota Gazoo Racing WRT | 3:16:09.4 | Report | |
| 4 | Croatia Rally | (United Kingdom) Elfyn Evans | (United Kingdom) Scott Martin | (Japan) Toyota Gazoo Racing WRT | 2:50:54.3 | Report | |
| 5 | Rally de Portugal | (Finland) Kalle Rovanperä | (Finland) Jonne Halttunen | (Japan) Toyota Gazoo Racing WRT | 3:35:11.7 | Report | |
| 6 | (Italy) Rally Italia Sardegna | (Belgium) Thierry Neuville | (Belgium) Martijn Wydaeghe | (South Korea) Hyundai Shell Mobis WRT | 3:40:01.4 | Report | |
| 7 | Safari Rally Kenya | (France) Sébastien Ogier | (France) Vincent Landais | (Japan) Toyota Gazoo Racing WRT | 3:30:42.5 | Report | |
| 8 | Rally Estonia | (Finland) Kalle Rovanperä | (Finland) Jonne Halttunen | (Japan) Toyota Gazoo Racing WRT | 2:36:03.2 | Report | |
| 9 | Rally Finland | (United Kingdom) Elfyn Evans | (United Kingdom) Scott Martin | (Japan) Toyota Gazoo Racing WRT | 2:33:11.3 | Report | |
| 10 | Acropolis Rally Greece | (Finland) Kalle Rovanperä | (Finland) Jonne Halttunen | (Japan) Toyota Gazoo Racing WRT | 3:00:16.7 | Report | |
| 11 | Rally Chile | (Estonia) Ott Tänak | (Estonia) Martin Järveoja | (United Kingdom) M-Sport Ford WRT | 3:06:38.1 | Report | |
| 12 | (Europe) Central European Rally | (Belgium) Thierry Neuville | (Belgium) Martijn Wydaeghe | (South Korea) Hyundai Shell Mobis WRT | 2:52:39.9 | Report | |
| 13 | Rally Japan | (United Kingdom) Elfyn Evans | (United Kingdom) Scott Martin | (Japan) Toyota Gazoo Racing WRT | 3:32:08.8 | Report | |

=== Scoring system ===
Points were awarded to the top ten classified finishers in each event. In the manufacturers' championship, teams were eligible to nominate three crews to score points, but these points were only awarded to the top two classified finishers representing a manufacturer and driving a 2023-specification Rally1 car. There were also five bonus points awarded to the winners of the Power Stage, four points for second place, three for third, two for fourth and one for fifth. Power Stage points were awarded in the drivers', co-drivers' and manufacturers' championships.

| Position | 1st | 2nd | 3rd | 4th | 5th | 6th | 7th | 8th | 9th | 10th |
| Points | 25 | 18 | 15 | 12 | 10 | 8 | 6 | 4 | 2 | 1 |

=== FIA World Rally Championship for Drivers ===
The driver who recorded a top-ten finish was taken into account for the championship regardless of the categories.

| Pos. | Driver | MON (Monaco) | SWE (Sweden) | MEX (Mexico) | CRO (Croatia) | POR (Portugal) | ITA (Italy) | KEN (Kenya) | EST (Estonia) | FIN (Finland) | GRE (Greece) | CHL (Chile) | EUR (Europe) | JPN (Japan) | Points |
|---|---|---|---|---|---|---|---|---|---|---|---|---|---|---|---|
| 1 | (Finland) Kalle Rovanperä | 2^{1} | 4^{3} | 4^{4} | 4^{2} | 1^{1} | 3^{1} | 2^{2} | 1^{1} | Ret | 1^{1} | 4^{1} | 2 | 3 | 250 |
| 2 | (United Kingdom) Elfyn Evans | 4^{3} | 5^{2} | 3 | 1 | Ret | 4^{4} | 3^{5} | 4^{2} | 1^{1} | 2^{2} | 3^{2} | 31^{1} | 1 | 216 |
| 3 | (Belgium) Thierry Neuville | 3^{4} | 3 | 2^{3} | 33^{1} | 5 | 1 | DSQ | 2^{5} | 2^{2} | 20 | 2^{3} | 1^{2} | 13^{1} | 189 |
| 4 | (Estonia) Ott Tänak | 5^{2} | 1^{4} | 9^{2} | 2 | 4^{2} | 35^{2} | 6^{1} | 8^{4} | Ret | 4^{3} | 1^{4} | 3^{5} | 6^{2} | 174 |
| 5 | (France) Sébastien Ogier | 1^{5} | | 1^{1} | 5^{3} | | 14^{5} | 1^{3} | | | 10 | | 4^{3} | 2^{5} | 133 |
| 6 | (Finland) Esapekka Lappi | 8 | 7^{1} | Ret | 3^{5} | 3^{3} | 2 | 12^{4} | 3^{3} | Ret | 5^{5} | Ret | Ret | 4^{3} | 113 |
| 7 | (Japan) Takamoto Katsuta | 6 | Ret | 23 | 6^{4} | 33^{4} | 40^{3} | 4 | 7 | 3^{4} | 6 | 5^{5} | 5^{4} | 5^{4} | 101 |
| 8 | (Spain) Dani Sordo | 7 | | 5^{5} | | 2^{5} | Ret | 5 | | | 3^{4} | | | Ret | 63 |
| 9 | (Finland) Teemu Suninen | | 15 | | | 10 | 6 | | 5 | 4^{3} | | Ret | 6 | | 42 |
| 10 | (Sweden) Oliver Solberg | 14 | 8 | 8 | 10 | 7 | 44 | 9 | 38 | 6 | Ret | 6 | | | 33 |
| 11 | (Norway) Andreas Mikkelsen | | | | | 8 | 5 | | 9 | 10 | 7 | | 23 | 7 | 29 |
| 12 | (France) Pierre-Louis Loubet | Ret | 6 | 27 | 7 | 32 | Ret | 7 | 6 | 45 | Ret | Ret | 10 | | 29 |
| 13 | (United Kingdom) Gus Greensmith | | | 6 | 14 | 6 | Ret | | Ret | Ret | 8 | 7 | 14 | | 26 |
| 14 | (Republic of Ireland) Craig Breen | | 2^{5} | | WD | | | | | | | | | | 19 |
| 15 | (France) Yohan Rossel | 9 | | | 8 | 9 | 8 | | | 17 | 9 | 9 | Ret | | 16 |
| 16 | (Poland) Kajetan Kajetanowicz | | | 10 | | | 7 | 8 | | | 13 | Ret | 12 | 9 | 13 |
| 17 | (Finland) Sami Pajari | DNS | 10 | | 13 | 22 | 29 | | 10 | 7 | Ret | 8 | 13 | | 12 |
| 18 | (Finland) Jari-Matti Latvala | | | | | | | | | 5^{5} | | | | | 11 |
| 19 | Nikolay Gryazin (Note: Nikolay Gryazin is a Russian national, but competes as an Authorised Neutral Athlete in accordance with recommendations made by the International Olympic Committee, after a decision by the FIA to ban all connections with Russia following the Russian invasion of Ukraine.) | 10 | 11 | Ret | 9 | 30 | 34 | | | 9 | 47 | 10 | 16 | 8 | 10 |
| 20 | (France) Adrien Fourmaux | 13 | | 16 | 12 | 15 | Ret | | | 8 | 11 | | 8 | Ret | 8 |
| 21 | (Finland) Emil Lindholm | | 16 | 7 | 11 | | Ret | | 11 | 20 | | Ret | Ret | | 6 |
| 22 | (Luxembourg) Grégoire Munster | 17 | 26 | | 26 | 42 | 11 | Ret | 18 | 15 | 12 | Ret | 7 | Ret | 6 |
| 23 | (Poland) Mikołaj Marczyk | | | | | 14 | 9 | | 13 | 13 | 16 | | 15 | | 2 |
| 24 | (France) Nicolas Ciamin | | Ret | | | | 33 | | | 16 | | | 9 | | 2 |
| 25 | (Norway) Ole Christian Veiby | | 9 | | | | | | | | | | | | 2 |
| 26 | (Czech Republic) Erik Cais | 12 | | 44 | | 34 | 10 | | | | | | 11 | | 1 |
| 27 | (Czech Republic) Martin Prokop | | | 11 | | | 13 | 10 | | | 15 | | | | 1 |
| 28 | (Japan) Hiroki Arai | | | | | | | | | | | | | 10 | 1 |
| Pos. | Driver | MON (Monaco) | SWE (Sweden) | MEX (Mexico) | CRO (Croatia) | POR (Portugal) | ITA (Italy) | KEN (Kenya) | EST (Estonia) | FIN (Finland) | GRE (Greece) | CHL (Chile) | EUR (Europe) | JPN (Japan) | Points |

Key
| Colour | Result |
|---|---|
| Gold | Winner |
| Silver | 2nd place |
| Bronze | 3rd place |
| Green | Points finish |
| Blue | Non-points finish |
| Blue | Non-classified finish (NC) |
| Purple | Did not finish (Ret) |
| Black | Excluded (EX) |
| Black | Disqualified (DSQ) |
| White | Did not start (DNS) |
| White | Cancelled (C) |
| Blank | Withdrew entry from the event (WD) |

Notes:
^{1 2 3 4 5} – Power Stage position

=== FIA World Rally Championship for Co-Drivers ===
The co-driver who recorded a top-ten finish was taken into account for the championship regardless of the categories.

| Pos. | Co-driver | MON (Monaco) | SWE (Sweden) | MEX (Mexico) | CRO (Croatia) | POR (Portugal) | ITA (Italy) | KEN (Kenya) | EST (Estonia) | FIN (Finland) | GRE (Greece) | CHL (Chile) | EUR (Europe) | JPN (Japan) | Points |
|---|---|---|---|---|---|---|---|---|---|---|---|---|---|---|---|
| 1 | (Finland) Jonne Halttunen | 2^{1} | 4^{3} | 4^{4} | 4^{2} | 1^{1} | 3^{1} | 2^{2} | 1^{1} | Ret | 1^{1} | 4^{1} | 2 | 3 | 250 |
| 2 | (United Kingdom) Scott Martin | 4^{3} | 5^{2} | 3 | 1 | Ret | 4^{4} | 3^{5} | 4^{2} | 1^{1} | 2^{2} | 3^{2} | 31^{1} | 1 | 216 |
| 3 | (Belgium) Martijn Wydaeghe | 3^{4} | 3 | 2^{3} | 33^{1} | 5 | 1 | DSQ | 2^{5} | 2^{2} | 20 | 2^{3} | 1^{2} | 13^{1} | 189 |
| 4 | (Estonia) Martin Järveoja | 5^{2} | 1^{4} | 9^{2} | 2 | 4^{2} | 35^{2} | 6^{1} | 8^{4} | Ret | 4^{3} | 1^{4} | 3^{5} | 6^{2} | 174 |
| 5 | (France) Vincent Landais | 1^{5} | | 1^{1} | 5^{3} | | 14^{5} | 1^{3} | | | 10 | | 4^{3} | 2^{5} | 133 |
| 6 | (Finland) Janne Ferm | 8 | 7^{1} | Ret | 3^{5} | 3^{3} | 2 | 12^{4} | 3^{3} | Ret | 5^{5} | Ret | Ret | 4^{3} | 113 |
| 7 | (Republic of Ireland) Aaron Johnston | 6 | Ret | 23 | 6^{4} | 33^{4} | 40^{3} | 4 | 7 | 3^{4} | 6 | 5^{5} | 5^{4} | 5^{4} | 101 |
| 8 | (Spain) Cándido Carrera | 7 | | 5^{5} | | 2^{5} | Ret | 5 | | | 3^{4} | | | Ret | 63 |
| 9 | (Finland) Mikko Markkula | | 15 | | | 10 | 6 | | 5 | 4^{3} | | Ret | 6 | | 42 |
| 10 | (United Kingdom) Elliott Edmondson | 14 | 8 | 8 | 10 | 7 | 44 | 9 | 38 | 6 | Ret | 6 | | | 33 |
| 11 | (Norway) Torstein Eriksen | | 9 | | | 8 | 5 | | 9 | 10 | 7 | | 23 | 7 | 31 |
| 12 | (Belgium) Nicolas Gilsoul | Ret | 6 | 27 | 7 | 32 | Ret | 7 | 6 | 45 | Ret | Ret | WD | | 28 |
| 13 | (Sweden) Jonas Andersson | | | 6 | 14 | 6 | Ret | | Ret | Ret | 8 | 7 | 14 | | 26 |
| 14 | (Republic of Ireland) James Fulton | | 2^{5} | | WD | Ret | | | 16 | 19 | | | 45 | | 19 |
| 15 | (France) Arnaud Dunand | 9 | | | 8 | 9 | 8 | | | 17 | 9 | 9 | Ret | | 16 |
| 16 | (Poland) Maciej Szczepaniak | | | 10 | | | 7 | 8 | | | 13 | Ret | 12 | 9 | 13 |
| 17 | (Finland) Enni Mälkönen | DNS | 10 | | 13 | 22 | 29 | | 10 | 7 | Ret | 8 | 13 | | 12 |
| 18 | (Finland) Juho Hänninen | | | | | | | | | 5^{5} | | | | | 11 |
| 19 | Konstantin Aleksandrov (Note: Konstantin Aleksandrov is a Russian national, but competes as an Authorised Neutral Athlete in accordance with recommendations made by the International Olympic Committee, after a decision by the FIA to ban all connections with Russia following the Russian invasion of Ukraine.) | 10 | 11 | Ret | 9 | 30 | 34 | | | 9 | 47 | 10 | 12 | 8 | 10 |
| 20 | (France) Alexandre Coria | 13 | | 16 | 12 | 15 | Ret | | | 8 | 11 | | 8 | Ret | 8 |
| 21 | (Finland) Reeta Hämäläinen | | 16 | 7 | 11 | | Ret | | 11 | 20 | | Ret | Ret | | 6 |
| 22 | (Belgium) Louis Louka | 17 | 26 | | 26 | 42 | 11 | Ret | 18 | 15 | 12 | Ret | 7 | Ret | 6 |
| 23 | (Poland) Szymon Gospodarczyk | | | | | 14 | 9 | | 13 | 13 | 16 | | | | 2 |
| 24 | (France) Yannick Roche | | Ret | | | | 33 | | | 16 | | | 9 | | 2 |
| 25 | (Czech Republic) Petr Těšínský | 12 | | 44 | | 34 | 10 | | | | | | | | 1 |
| 26 | (Czech Republic) Zdeněk Jůrka | | | | | | | 10 | | | | | | | 1 |
| 27 | (France) Benjamin Veillas | | | | | | | | | | | | 10 | | 1 |
| 28 | (Japan) Hiroki Tachikui | | | | | | | | | | | | | 10 | 1 |
| Pos. | Co-driver | MON (Monaco) | SWE (Sweden) | MEX (Mexico) | CRO (Croatia) | POR (Portugal) | ITA (Italy) | KEN (Kenya) | EST (Estonia) | FIN (Finland) | GRE (Greece) | CHL (Chile) | EUR (Europe) | JPN (Japan) | Points |

Key
| Colour | Result |
|---|---|
| Gold | Winner |
| Silver | 2nd place |
| Bronze | 3rd place |
| Green | Points finish |
| Blue | Non-points finish |
| Blue | Non-classified finish (NC) |
| Purple | Did not finish (Ret) |
| Black | Excluded (EX) |
| Black | Disqualified (DSQ) |
| White | Did not start (DNS) |
| White | Cancelled (C) |
| Blank | Withdrew entry from the event (WD) |

Notes:
^{1 2 3 4 5} – Power Stage position

=== FIA World Rally Championship for Manufacturers ===
Only the best two results of each manufacturer in the respective overall classification and Power Stage at each rally were taken into account for the championship.

| Pos. | Manufacturer | MON (Monaco) | SWE (Sweden) | MEX (Mexico) | CRO (Croatia) | POR (Portugal) | ITA (Italy) | KEN (Kenya) | EST (Estonia) | FIN (Finland) | GRE (Greece) | CHL (Chile) | EUR (Europe) | JPN (Japan) | Points |
|---|---|---|---|---|---|---|---|---|---|---|---|---|---|---|---|
| 1 | (Japan) Toyota Gazoo Racing WRT | 1 | 4^{2} | 1^{1} | 3^{2} | 1^{1} | 3^{1} | 1^{3} | 1^{1} | 1^{1} | 1^{1} | 3^{2} | 2 | 1 | 548 |
| 1 | (Japan) Toyota Gazoo Racing WRT | 2^{1} | 5^{3} | 3 | 4^{3} | 6^{4} | 4^{4} | 2^{2} | 4^{2} | 3^{4} | 2^{2} | 4^{1} | 4^{3} | 2^{5} | 548 |
| 1 | (Japan) Toyota Gazoo Racing WRT | NC^{3} | Ret | NC^{4} | WD | Ret | NC | NC | NC | Ret | NC | NC | NC^{1} | NC | 548 |
| 2 | (South Korea) Hyundai Shell Mobis WRT | 3^{4} | 2^{5} | 2^{3} | 2^{5} | 2^{5} | 1 | 3 | 2^{5} | 2^{2} | 3^{4} | 2^{3} | 1^{2} | 3^{3} | 432 |
| 2 | (South Korea) Hyundai Shell Mobis WRT | 5 | 3 | 4^{5} | 6^{1} | 3^{3} | 2 | 6^{4} | 3^{3} | 4^{3} | 5^{5} | Ret | 5 | 5^{1} | 432 |
| 2 | (South Korea) Hyundai Shell Mobis WRT | NC | NC^{1} | Ret | WD | NC | Ret | DSQ | NC | Ret | NC | Ret | Ret | Ret | 432 |
| 3 | (United Kingdom) M-Sport Ford WRT | 4^{2} | 1^{4} | 5^{2} | 1 | 4^{2} | 5^{2} | 4^{1} | 5 | 5 | 4^{3} | 1^{4} | 3^{5} | 4^{2} | 287 |
| 3 | (United Kingdom) M-Sport Ford WRT | Ret | 6 | 6 | 5 | 5 | Ret | 5 | 6^{4} | Ret | Ret | Ret | 6 | Ret | 287 |
| Pos. | Manufacturer | MON (Monaco) | SWE (Sweden) | MEX (Mexico) | CRO (Croatia) | POR (Portugal) | ITA (Italy) | KEN (Kenya) | EST (Estonia) | FIN (Finland) | GRE (Greece) | CHL (Chile) | EUR (Europe) | JPN (Japan) | Points |

Key
| Colour | Result |
|---|---|
| Gold | Winner |
| Silver | 2nd place |
| Bronze | 3rd place |
| Green | Points finish |
| Blue | Non-points finish |
| Blue | Non-classified finish (NC) |
| Purple | Did not finish (Ret) |
| Black | Excluded (EX) |
| Black | Disqualified (DSQ) |
| White | Did not start (DNS) |
| White | Cancelled (C) |
| Blank | Withdrew entry from the event (WD) |

Notes:
^{1 2 3 4 5} – Power Stage position

== Participants ==
Esapekka Lappi, who had returned to Toyota Gazoo Racing in 2022 after three years away, was set to move to Hyundai Motorsport for a full season in 2023, taking the seat vacated by Ott Tänak, who departed before the end of his contract. Hyundai would be Lappi's fourth official team in six seasons, having previously raced for Citroën before rejoining Toyota. In 2022, he contested seven rounds of the WRC calendar and took three podium finishes, in Sweden, Finland and Belgium.
