= Kalle Rovanperä =

Finnish rally driver (born 2000)

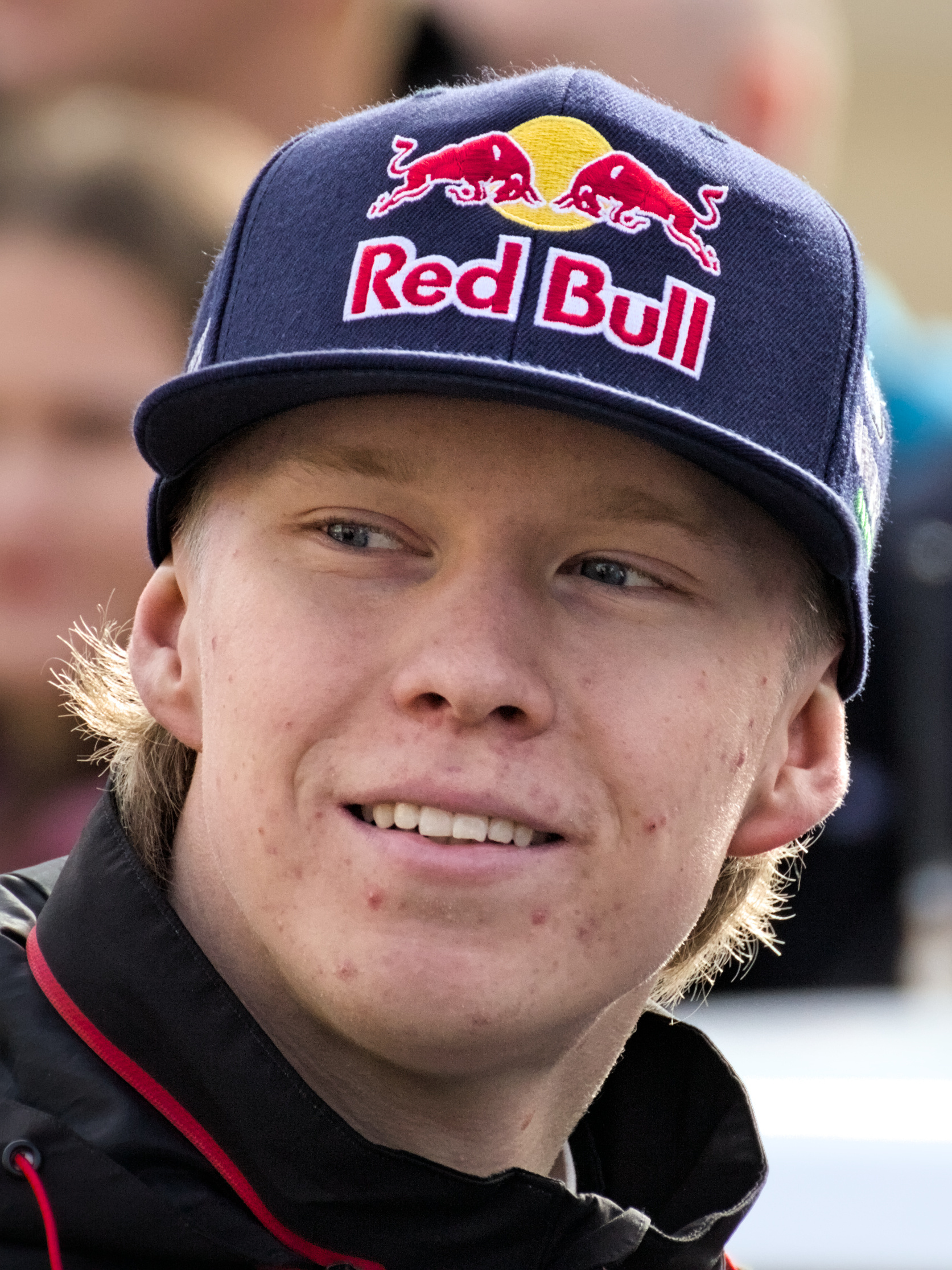
- Rovanperä at the 2023 Central European Rally
- Nationality: (Finland) Finnish
- Born: Kalle Alex Rovanperä; 1 October 2000 (age 26) Jyväskylä, Finland
- Relatives: Harri Rovanperä (father)
World Rally Championship record
- Years active: 2017–2025
- Co-driver: (Finland) Jonne Halttunen
- Teams: Toyota Gazoo Racing WRT
- Rallies: 86
- Championships: 2 (2022, 2023)
- Rally wins: 18
- Podiums: 30
- Stage wins: 269
- Total points: 1119
- First rally: 2017 Wales Rally GB
- First win: 2021 Rally Estonia
- Last win: 2025 Central European Rally
- Last rally: 2025 Rally Saudi Arabia
- Last updated on: 1 December 2025.

Kalle Alex Rovanperä (Finnish: [ˈkɑlːe ˈroʋɑmˌperæ]; born 1 October 2000) is a Finnish professional rally and racing driver who last competed in the Formula Regional Oceania Trophy with Hitech. He is a double World Rally Championship (WRC) champion, having won the 2022 and 2023 World Championships consecutively. As the son of former WRC driver Harri Rovanperä, he garnered international attention by starting rallying at an exceptionally young age.

Rovanperä won two titles in Latvia, before making his WRC debut in 2017. He won the World Rally Championship-2 Pro in 2019, and was promoted to the top tier by Toyota as their works driver in 2020. In 2021, Rovanperä became the youngest driver to win a World Rally Championship event by winning the 2021 Rally Estonia. In 2022, he became the youngest ever World Champion after winning the 2022 Rally New Zealand a day after his 22nd birthday.

== Early life and background ==
Kalle Alex Rovanperä was born on 1 October 2000 in Jyväskylä, Central Finland. He is the son of former WRC driver Harri Rovanperä, who was a factory driver for several teams and won a WRC round in Sweden in 2001. He garnered international attention at the age of eight, when footage of him driving a rally car was uploaded to the Internet, and participated his first rally at just ten years old. before he participated in the professional championships, he was coached by many compatriots, including Esapekka Lappi, who commented that a young Rovanperä already knew as much as him.

== Career ==
=== 2015–2017: Success in Latvia and WRC debut ===
In 2015, at the age of 14, Rovanperä competed in Latvia, where having a driver's license is not a requirement to take part in rallying. He won the Latvian rally championship with his Citroën C2 R2 Max car in the R2 class.

For the first three rallies of the 2016 Latvian rally series, Rovanperä drove a 220 kW (300 hp) four-wheel-drive Škoda Fabia S2000, which was a completely new WRC-2 class rally car with a two-litre naturally aspirated engine. He won the first rally, setting the fastest time at every stage. He finished as the runner-up the second rally despite a power steering issue. Rovanperä switched to a new Škoda Fabia R5 following another second-place finish in the Kurzeme rally. He scored four more podiums, including two victories for the rest of the season. Rovanperä eventually won the championship and became the youngest driver ever to win a national open class rally championship in any country at the age of 16.

In January 2017, the Finnish motorsport association AKK-Motorsport granted the 16-year-old Rovanperä special permission to take part in Finnish rally races and the Ralli SM national championship series. In addition to entering the rallies in the Finnish Rally Championship, he also participated in two other national championships: Latvia and Italy. Rovanperä also made his European Rally Championship debut in 2017 by entering the Rally Liepāja, where he finished second overall. He also successfully defended his title in Latvia by finishing every rally on the podium.

Having acquired his driving licence, Rovanperä made his WRC debut at the 2017 Wales Rally GB, driving an M-Sport-entered Ford Fiesta R5, as well as competing at the 2017 Rally Australia. He won the event in the WRC-2 category, becoming the youngest winner of a WRC-2 round, though he was the only contestant in the class.

=== 2018–2019: Steady improvement and WRC-2 Pro crown ===
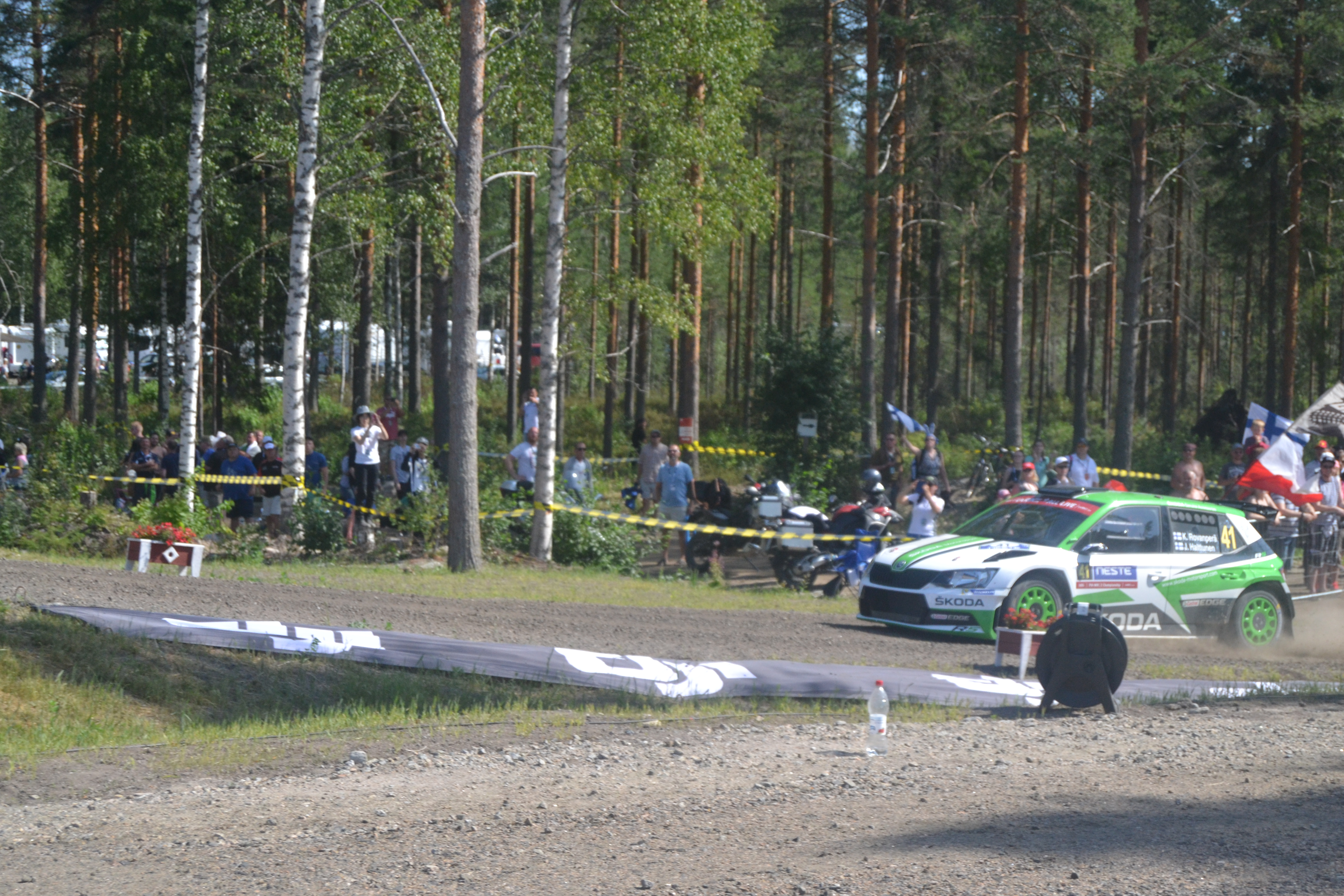
Rovanperä at the 2018 Rally Finland

Rovanperä joined Škoda Motorsport for the 2018 season. He recorded two victories at the 2018 Wales Rally GB and the 2018 Rally Catalunya, completing the championship third. Rovanperä also contested some events in the Asia Pacific Championship series.

Rovanperä was retained by the team for the 2019 season. He took his first victory of the season at the 2019 Rally Chile, and took over the championship a round later at the 2019 Rally de Portugal. He would go on to win three more rallies during the rest of the season and eventually sealed the title at the 2019 Wales Rally GB. His only retirement of the season was at the 2019 Tour de Corse, where he crashed out during the ninth special stage.

In November 2019, Toyota announced that Rovanperä would drive for the Japanese manufacturer in 2020, alongside world champion Sébastien Ogier and Elfyn Evans.

=== 2020–2021: Top-tier debut and youngest WRC event winner ===
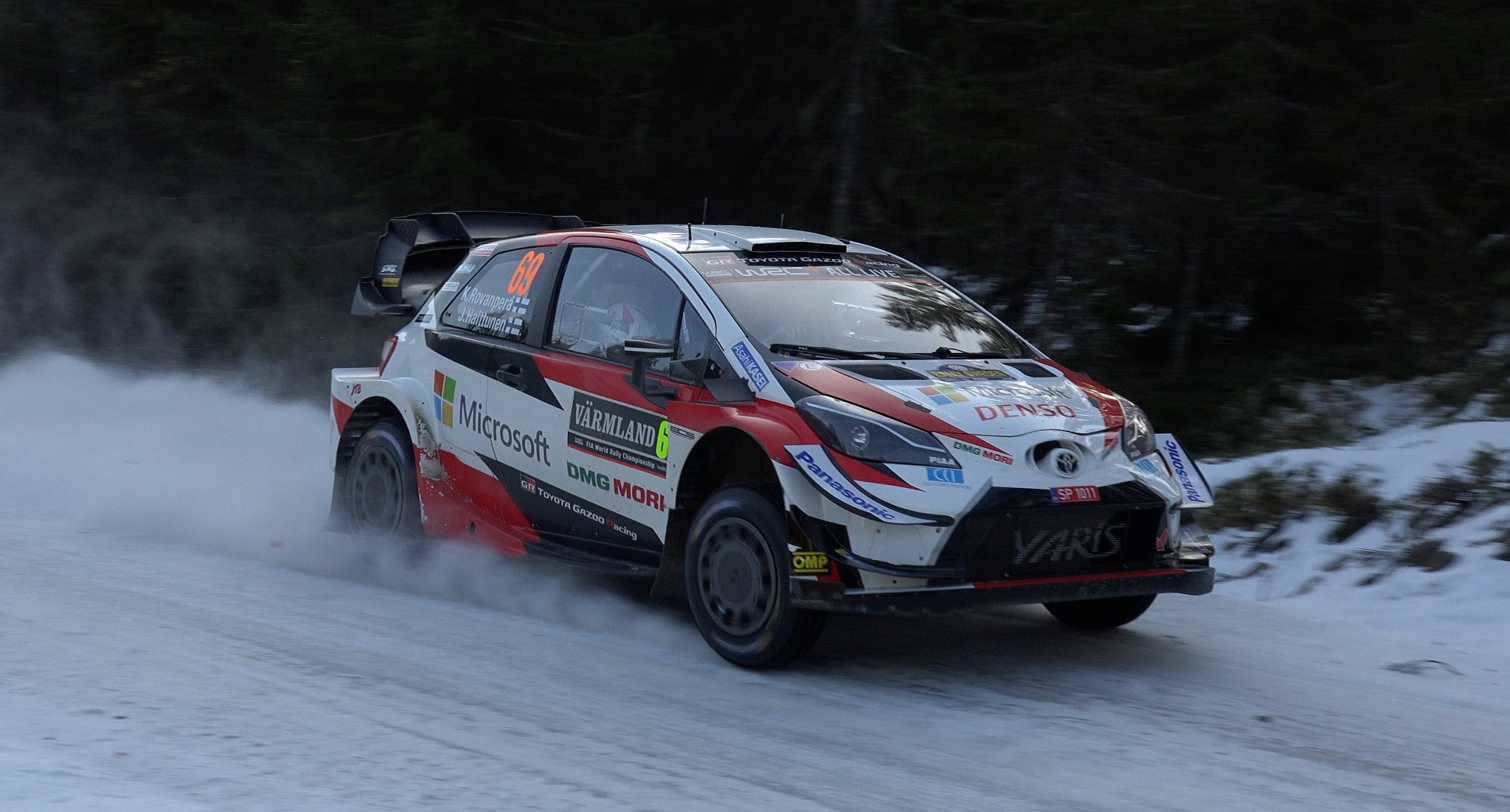
Rovanperä at the 2020 Rally Sweden.

Rovanperä chose 69 as his car number. He scored his first podium at his second outing in the top class at the 2020 Rally Sweden by finishing third. At 19 years, 4 months and 16 days, Rovanperä became the youngest WRC podium finisher. Rovanperä eventually finished fifth at the end of season.

Rovanperä's 2021 campaign started with a fourth at the 2021 Monte Carlo Rally and a second at the 2021 Arctic Rally Finland, which was enough to lead the WRC championship for the first time in his career. Following a series of troublesome events, Rovanperä took his first WRC career victory at the 2021 Rally Estonia. The victory saw him become the youngest driver to win a World Rally Championship event at 21 years and 289 days, breaking the previous record of 22 years and 313 days held by his team boss Jari-Matti Latvala. Later in 2021, he also won the 2021 Acropolis Rally. Rovanperä eventually finished fourth at the conclusion of the championship.

=== 2022–2023: Youngest World Rally Champion ===
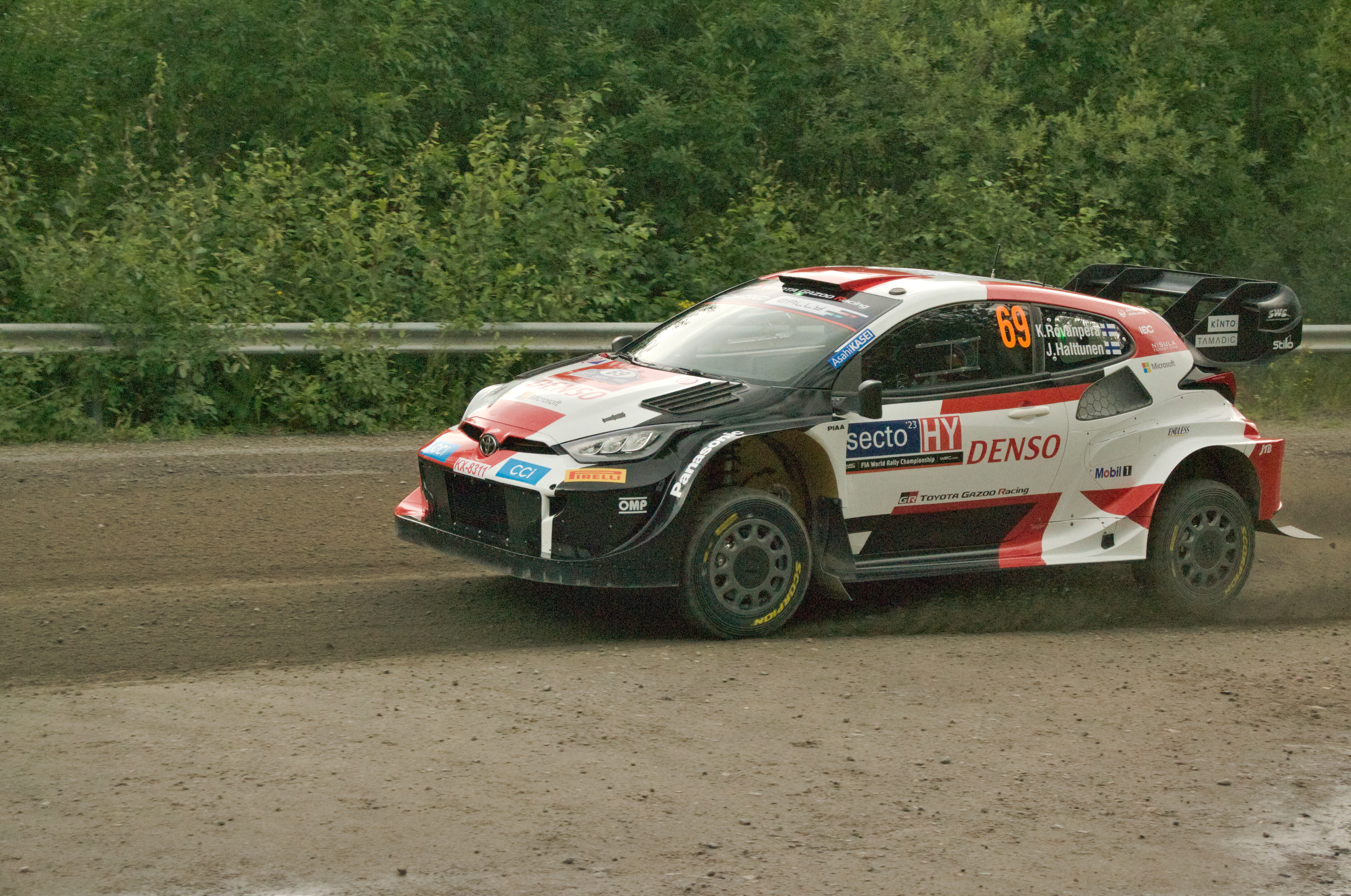
Rovanperä at the 2023 Rally Finland

Rovanperä started 2022 with a fourth place at the 2022 Monte Carlo Rally, before he went on to win a hat-trick events. Following a fifth place at the 2022 Rally Italia Sardegna, he secured back-to-back victories to build a commanding lead in the championship. Despite a number of eventful rallies, he returned to form to claim his sixth rally of the season at the 2022 Rally New Zealand. The performance was enough to secure the first world title of his career. At the age of 22 years and 1 day, Rovanperä became the youngest World Rally Champion, breaking the previous record set by Colin McRae at the age of 27 years and 89 days in 1995. He also became the first Finnish World Rally Champion since Marcus Grönholm in 2002.

Rovanperä did not win a rally until the fifth round of the championship, the 2023 Rally de Portugal, which helped him to lead the championship. He won two more events later in the year, consolidating his championship lead. At the 2023 Central European Rally, major title rival Elfyn Evans was out of contention, whist Rovanperä finished second, which was enough to seal a back-to-back world title.

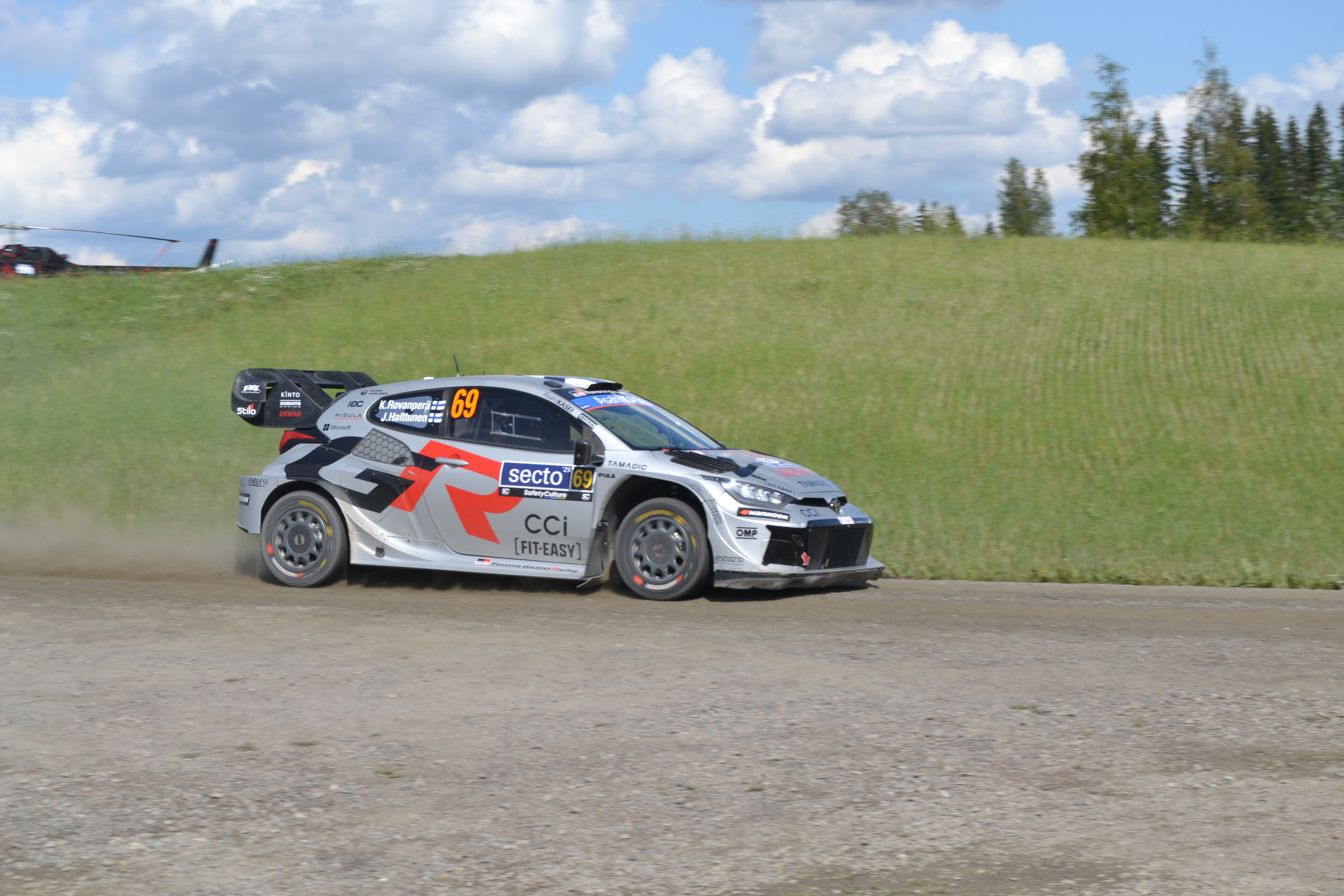
Rovanperä and Jonne Halttunen won 2025 Rally Finland for the first time in their career.

Rovanperä signed a multi-year contract with Toyota following the end of 2023 season. However, it was announced that Rovanperä would only contest a partial season in 2024 before returning full time in 2025.

=== 2024–present: WRC retirement, curtailed move to Super Formula ===
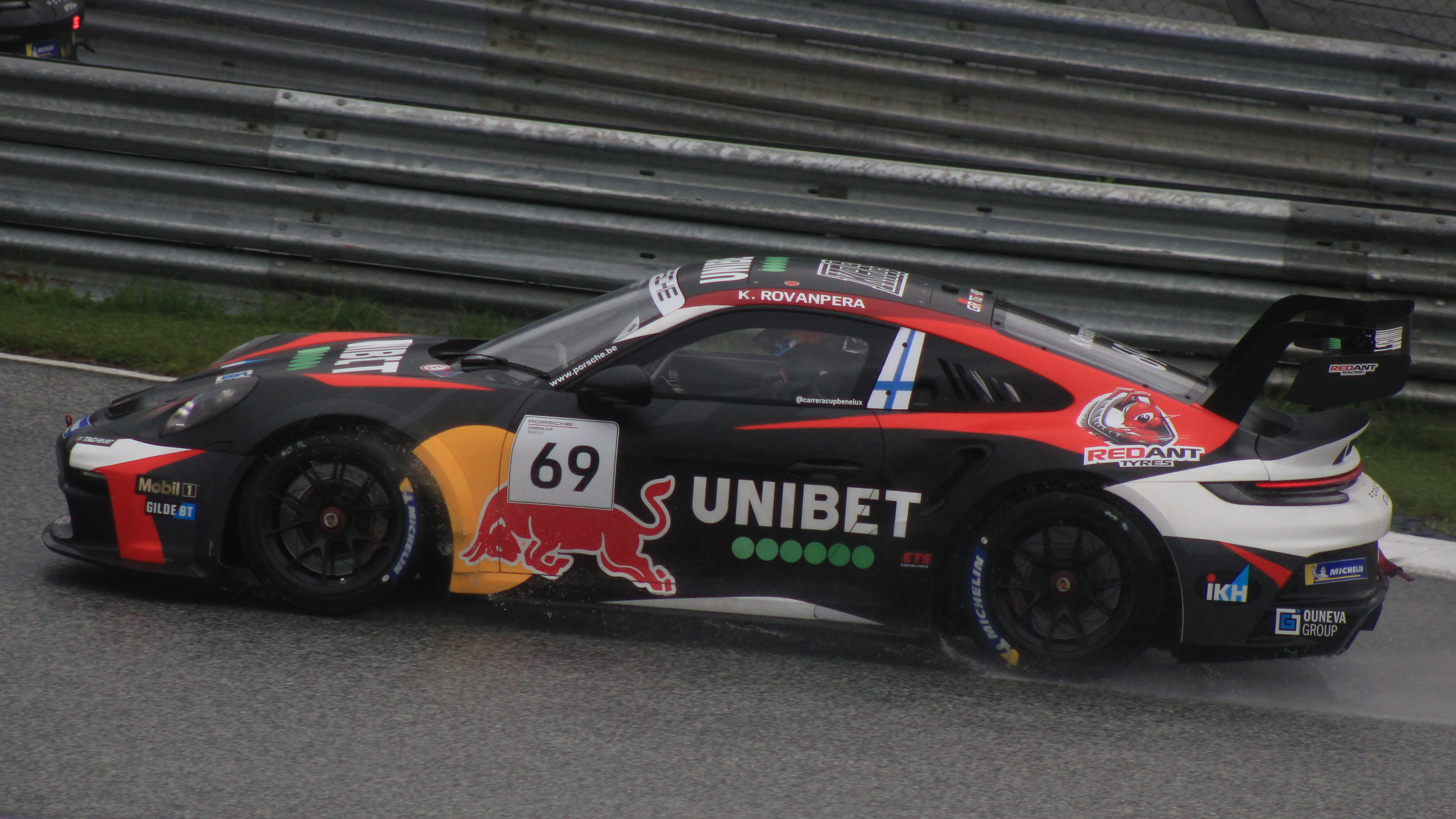
Rovanperä at the Red Bull Ring in 2024

Rovanperä made his racing outside rally debut in 2024, where he competed in Porsche Carrera Cup Benelux. He ended in fourth place with three wins to his name, although he missed two rounds. He made his endurance debut in 2025 where he competed in 2025 Middle East Trophy with Proton Huber Competition.

On 9 October 2025, Rovanperä announced his retirement from the World Rally Championship at the end of the 2025 season, and that he would be moving on to single seater racing in 2026. During the off-season, he entered the 2026 Formula Regional Oceania Trophy with Hitech. Rovanperä was slated to compete in the Super Formula Championship with KCMG with support of his rally manufacturer Toyota Gazoo Racing. Ultimately, he withdrew from the championship prior to the first race after he was diagnosed with benign paroxysmal positional vertigo.

== Other activities ==
In 2022, Rovanperä competed at the Mondello Park round of the Drift Masters European Championship with a Toyota Supra, where he reached the round of 16. In 2023, he entered two rounds of the Formula Drift Japan with a Toyota GR Corolla, claiming a win at Ebisu and a second place at Okayama. He also entered three rounds of the Drift Masters European Championship with a Toyota Supra.

Rovanperä entered four rounds of the 2024 Porsche Carrera Cup Benelux. He finished his first race weekend in Zandvoort in fourth and fifth place, and afterwards took his first circuit victory in Imola, finishing 2nd and 1st.

In November 2024, Rovanperä was able to test an F1 car with Red Bull Racing at the Austrian Red Bull Ring. Also in November 2024, Rovanperä competed in the Killarney Historic Rally.

Rovanperä said on Instagram on Christmas Eve that he would be seen in the Dubai 24 Hour race from 10 to 12 January 2025.

In October 2025, Rovanperä was able to test an F2 car with Hitech at the Circuito de Jerez in Spain.

== Personal life ==
In June 2017, the Finnish transport safety agency Trafi granted Rovanperä special permission to apply for a driver's license when he turned 17. On 2 October 2017, a day after his 17th birthday, Rovanperä successfully completed the mandatory driving test after having completed the theory part beforehand.

In 2020, Rovanperä moved to Estonia. He has lived in Monaco since 2022.

== Awards and honours ==
- Autosport Awards International Rally Driver of the Year: 2022–2023

== Rally victories ==
=== WRC victories ===
#	Event	Season	Co-driver	Car	Ref.
1	2021 Rally Estonia	2021	(Finland) Jonne Halttunen	Toyota Yaris WRC	
2	(Greece) 2021 Acropolis Rally	2021	(Finland) Jonne Halttunen	Toyota Yaris WRC	
3	2022 Rally Sweden	2022	(Finland) Jonne Halttunen	Toyota GR Yaris Rally1	
4	2022 Croatia Rally	2022	(Finland) Jonne Halttunen	Toyota GR Yaris Rally1	
5	2022 Rally de Portugal	2022	(Finland) Jonne Halttunen	Toyota GR Yaris Rally1	
6	(Kenya) 2022 Safari Rally	2022	(Finland) Jonne Halttunen	Toyota GR Yaris Rally1	
7	2022 Rally Estonia	2022	(Finland) Jonne Halttunen	Toyota GR Yaris Rally1	
8	2022 Rally New Zealand	2022	(Finland) Jonne Halttunen	Toyota GR Yaris Rally1	
9	2023 Rally de Portugal	2023	(Finland) Jonne Halttunen	Toyota GR Yaris Rally1	
10	2023 Rally Estonia	2023	(Finland) Jonne Halttunen	Toyota GR Yaris Rally1	
11	(Greece) 2023 Acropolis Rally	2023	(Finland) Jonne Halttunen	Toyota GR Yaris Rally1	
12	(Kenya) 2024 Safari Rally	2024	(Finland) Jonne Halttunen	Toyota GR Yaris Rally1	
13	2024 Rally Poland	2024	(Finland) Jonne Halttunen	Toyota GR Yaris Rally1	
14	2024 Rally Latvia	2024	(Finland) Jonne Halttunen	Toyota GR Yaris Rally1	
15	2024 Rally Chile	2024	(Finland) Jonne Halttunen	Toyota GR Yaris Rally1	
16	(Spain) 2025 Rally Islas Canarias	2025	(Finland) Jonne Halttunen	Toyota GR Yaris Rally1	
17	2025 Rally Finland	2025	(Finland) Jonne Halttunen	Toyota GR Yaris Rally1	
18	(Europe) 2025 Central European Rally	2025	(Finland) Jonne Halttunen	Toyota GR Yaris Rally1	

=== WRC-2 victories ===
#	Event	Season	Co-driver	Car	Ref.
1	2017 Rally Australia	2017	(Finland) Jonne Halttunen	Ford Fiesta R5	
2	(United Kingdom) 2018 Wales Rally GB	2018	(Finland) Jonne Halttunen	Škoda Fabia R5	
3	(Spain) 2018 Rally Catalunya	2018	(Finland) Jonne Halttunen	Škoda Fabia R5	

=== WRC-2 Pro victories ===
#	Event	Season	Co-driver	Car	Ref.
1	2019 Rally Chile	2019	(Finland) Jonne Halttunen	Škoda Fabia R5	
2	2019 Rally de Portugal	2019	(Finland) Jonne Halttunen	Škoda Fabia R5 evo	
3	(Italy) 2019 Rally Italia Sardegna	2019	(Finland) Jonne Halttunen	Škoda Fabia R5 evo	
4	2019 Rally Finland	2019	(Finland) Jonne Halttunen	Škoda Fabia R5 evo	
5	(United Kingdom) 2019 Wales Rally GB	2019	(Finland) Jonne Halttunen	Škoda Fabia R5 evo	

== Rally career results ==
=== WRC results ===
Year	Entrant	Car	1	2	3	4	5	6	7	8	9	10	11	12	13	14	Pos.	Points
2017	Kalle Rovanperä	Ford Fiesta R5	MON	SWE	MEX	FRA	ARG	POR	ITA	POL	FIN	GER	ESP	GBR; 35	AUS; 10		25th	1
2018	Kalle Rovanperä	Škoda Fabia R5	MON; 11	SWE													22nd	3
2018	Škoda Motorsport	Škoda Fabia R5			MEX; 35	FRA	ARG; Ret	POR	ITA	FIN; 14							22nd	3
2018	Škoda Motorsport II	Škoda Fabia R5									GER; 10	TUR	GBR; 9	ESP; 12	AUS		22nd	3
2019	Škoda Motorsport	Škoda Fabia R5	MON; 18	SWE; 18	MEX	FRA; Ret	ARG	CHL; 8									12th	18
2019	Škoda Motorsport	Skoda Fabia R5 evo							POR; 6	ITA; 9	FIN; 9	GER; 16	TUR; 18	GBR; 9	ESP; 12	AUS; C	12th	18
2020	Toyota Gazoo Racing WRT	Toyota Yaris WRC	MON; 5	SWE; 3	MEX; 5	EST; 5	TUR; 4	ITA; Ret	MNZ; 5								5th	80
2021	Toyota Gazoo Racing WRT	Toyota Yaris WRC	MON; 4	ARC; 2	CRO; Ret	POR; 22	ITA; 25	KEN; 6	EST; 1	BEL; 3	GRE; 1	FIN; 34	ESP; 5	MNZ; 9			4th	142
2022	Toyota Gazoo Racing WRT	Toyota GR Yaris Rally1	MON; 4	SWE; 1	CRO; 1	POR; 1	ITA; 5	KEN; 1	EST; 1	FIN; 2	BEL; 62	GRE; 15	NZL; 1	ESP; 3	JPN; 12		1st	255
2023	Toyota Gazoo Racing WRT	Toyota GR Yaris Rally1	MON; 2	SWE; 4	MEX; 4	CRO; 4	POR; 1	ITA; 3	KEN; 2	EST; 1	FIN; Ret	GRE; 1	CHL; 4	EUR; 2	JPN; 3		1st	250
2024	Toyota Gazoo Racing WRT	Toyota GR Yaris Rally1	MON	SWE; 39	KEN; 1	CRO	POR; 31	ITA	POL; 1	LAT; 1	FIN; Ret	GRE	CHL; 1	EUR	JPN		7th	114
2025	Toyota Gazoo Racing WRT	Toyota GR Yaris Rally1	MON; 4	SWE; 5	KEN; Ret	ESP; 1	POR; 3	ITA; 3	GRE; 26	EST; 4	FIN; 1	PAR; 5	CHL; 6	EUR; 1	JPN; 6	SAU; 7	3rd	256

=== WRC-2 results ===
Year	Entrant	Car	1	2	3	4	5	6	7	8	9	10	11	12	13	Pos.	Points
2017	Kalle Rovanperä	Ford Fiesta R5	MON	SWE	MEX	FRA	ARG	POR	ITA	POL	FIN	GER	ESP	GBR; 15	AUS; 1	15th	25
2018	Škoda Motorsport	Škoda Fabia R5	MON	SWE	MEX; 5	FRA	ARG; Ret	POR	ITA	FIN; 4						3rd	90
2018	Škoda Motorsport II	Škoda Fabia R5									GER; 2	TUR	GBR; 1	ESP; 1	AUS	3rd	90

=== WRC-2 Pro results ===
Year	Entrant	Car	1	2	3	4	5	6	7	8	9	10	11	12	13	14	Pos.	Points
2019	Škoda Motorsport	Škoda Fabia R5	MON; 2	SWE; 2	MEX	FRA; Ret	ARG	CHL; 1									1st	176
2019	Škoda Motorsport	Skoda Fabia R5 evo							POR; 1	ITA; 1	FIN; 1	GER; 3	TUR; 3	GBR; 1	ESP; 3	AUS; C	1st	176

=== ERC results ===
Year	Entrant	Car	1	2	3	4	5	6	7	8	Pos.	Points
2017	Kalle Rovanperä	Ford Fiesta R5	ACO	ESP	GRC	CYP	POL	CZE	ROM	LVA; 2	12th	30

== Circuit racing career results ==
Season	Series	Team	Races	Wins	Poles	F/Laps	Podiums	Points	Position
2024	Porsche Carrera Cup Benelux	RedAnt Racing	8	3	0	0	5	134.5	4th
2024	Porsche Carrera Cup Italia	Prima Ghinzani Motorsport	2	0	0	0	0	18	19th
2025	Middle East Trophy - GT3	Proton Huber Competition	1	0	0	0	0	—	NC
2026	Formula Regional Oceania Trophy	Hitech	11	0	0	0	1	107	16th

=== Porsche Carrera Cup Benelux results ===
Year	Team	Car	1	2	3	4	5	6	7	8	9	10	11	12	Pos.	Points
2024	RedAnt Racing	Porsche 911 GT3	Spa	Spa	Zand; 4	Zand; 5	Imo; 2	Imo; 1	Ass	Ass	Rbr; 1	Rbr; 6	Zol; 3	Zol; 1	4th	134.5

=== Porsche Carrera Cup Italy results ===
Year	Team	Car	1	2	3	4	5	6	7	8	9	10	11	12	Pos.	Points
2024	Prima Ghinzani Motorsport	Porsche 911 GT3	MIS	MIS	IMO1	IMO1	MUG	MUG	IMO2	IMO2	VAL	VAL	MON; 6	MON; 8	19th	18

=== Complete Formula Regional Oceania Trophy results ===
(key) (Races in bold indicate pole position) (Races in italics indicate fastest lap)

Year	Team	1	2	3	4	5	6	7	8	9	10	11	12	13	14	15	16	DC	Points
2026	Hitech	HMP; 1; 17	HMP; 2; 12	HMP; 3; 13	HMP; 4 Ret	TAU; 1; 16	TAU; 2; 10	TAU; 3; 12	TAU; 4; 9	TER; 1; 3	TER; 2; 5	TER; 3 C	TER; 4; 7	HIG; 1 DNS	HIG; 2 WD	HIG; 3 WD	HIG; 4 WD	16th	107

Awards and achievements
Preceded by Sébastien Ogier	Autosport; International Rally Driver Award; 2022–2023	Succeeded by Sébastien Ogier
Sporting positions
Preceded by Sébastien Ogier	World Rally Champion; 2022–2023	Succeeded by Thierry Neuville
Records
Preceded by Jari-Matti Latvala; 22 years, 313 days (2008 Swedish Rally)	Youngest rally winner 20 years, 289 days (2021 Rally Estonia)	Succeeded by Incumbent
Preceded by Colin McRae; 27 years, 109 days (1995 season)	Youngest World Rally Champion; 22 years, 1 day (2022 season)	Succeeded by Incumbent
