= Matteo Gamba =

Italian rally driver

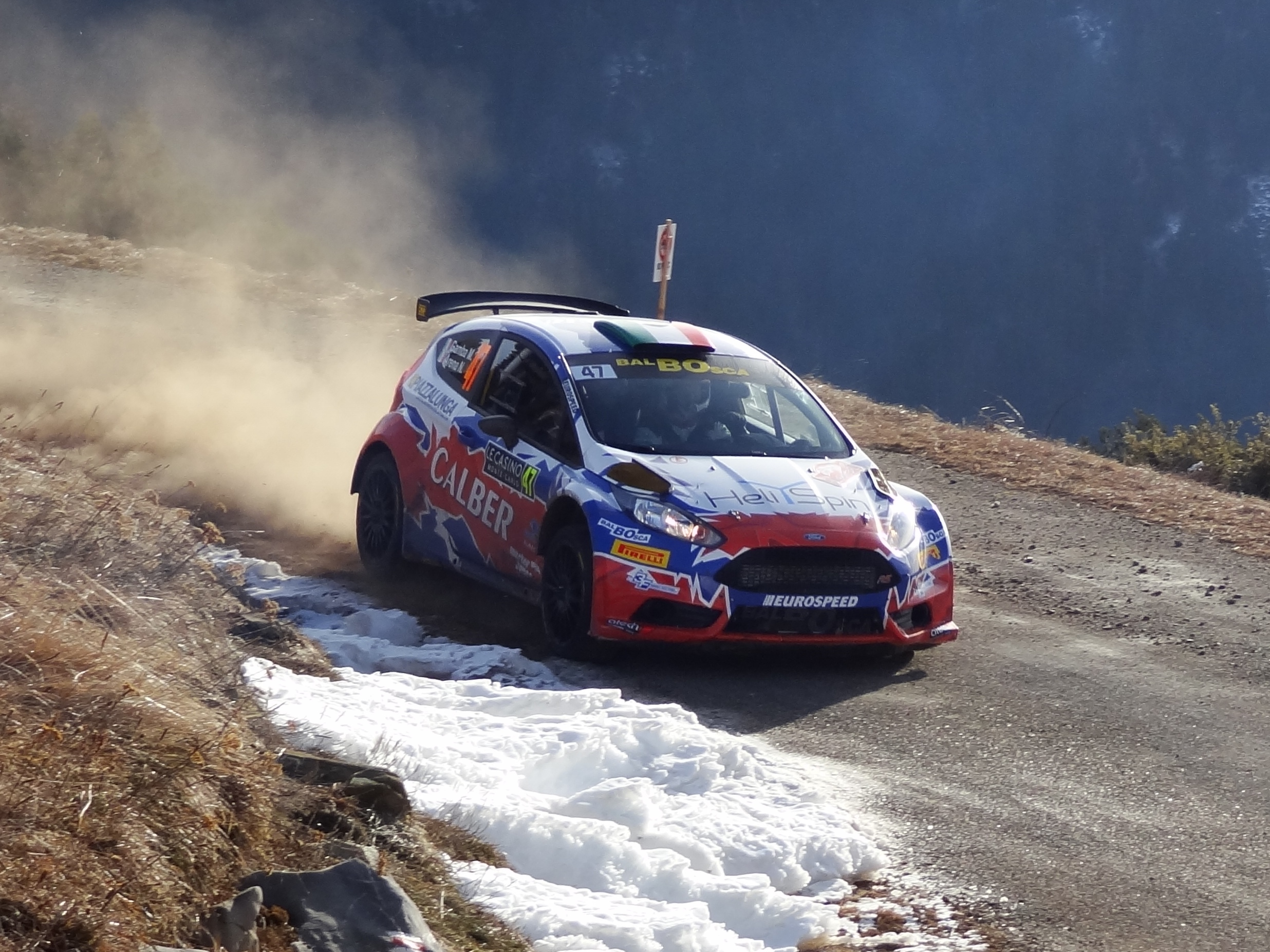

Personal information
- Nationality: (Italy) Italian
- Born: October 19, 1979 (age 47); Bergamo, Italy

World Rally Championship record
- Years active: 2014-2015
- Teams: Privateer
- Rallies: 3
- Championships: 0
- Rally wins: 0
- Podiums: 0
- Stage wins: 0
- Total points: 2
- First rally: 2014 Monte Carlo Rally
- Last rally: 2015 Monte Carlo Rally

Matteo Gamba (born 19 October 1979) is an Italian rally driver from Bergamo.

== Career ==
In his WRC debut, Gamba achieved a personal best ninth place as a privateer entry and his first-ever points. He drove a Peugeot 207 S2000.

== Career results ==
=== WRC results ===
Year	Entrant	Car	1	2	3	4	5	6	7	8	9	10	11	12	13	Pos.	Points
2014	Matteo Gamba	Peugeot 207 S2000	MON; 9	SWE	MEX	POR	ARG	ITA	POL	FIN	GER	AUS	FRA; Ret	ESP	GBR	24th	2
2015	Matteo Gamba	Ford Fiesta R5	MON; Ret	SWE	MEX	ARG	POR	ITA	POL	FIN	GER	AUS	FRA	ESP	GBR	NC	0
