= Filip Mareš =

Czech rally driver

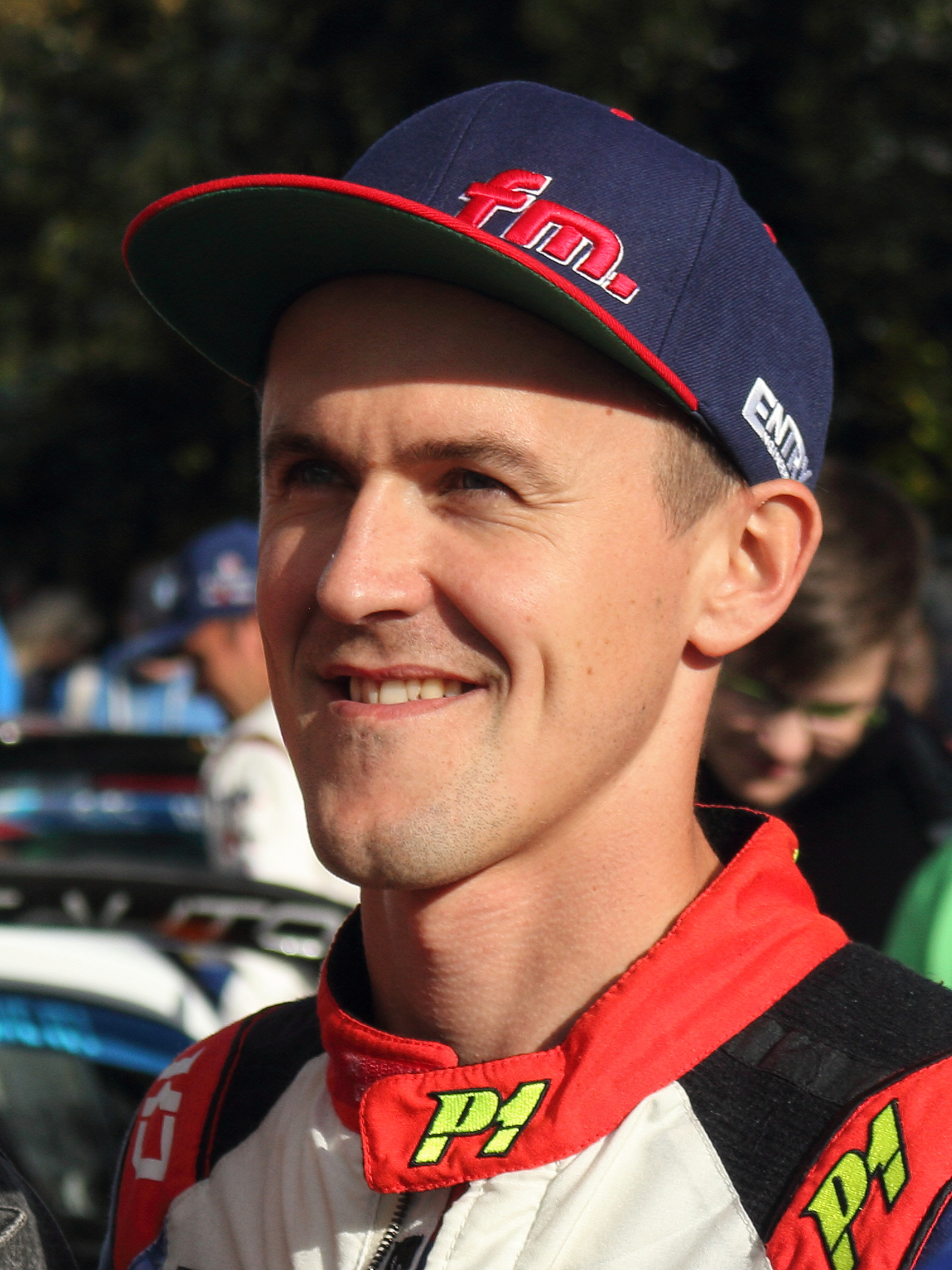
- Mareš in 2021

Personal information
- Nationality: (Czech Republic) Czech
- Born: 22 August 1991 (age 35); Mladá Boleslav, Czechoslovakia

World Rally Championship record
- Years active: 2020, 2024–present
- Co-driver: Radovan Bucha
- Rallies: 2
- Championships: 0
- Rally wins: 0
- Podiums: 0
- Stage wins: 0
- Total points: 0
- First rally: 2020 Rally Sweden

Filip Mareš (born 22 August 1991) is a Czech rally driver.

== Rally career ==
Mareš made his WRC debut at the 2020 Rally Sweden in a Škoda Fabia Rally2 evo, which was supported by Škoda Motorsport. He scored his first WRC points at the 2024 Central European Rally.

== Rally results ==
=== WRC results ===
Year	Entrant	Car	1	2	3	4	5	6	7	8	9	10	11	12	13	Pos.	Points
2020	Filip Mareš	Škoda Fabia Rally2 evo	MON	SWE; 20	MEX	EST	TUR	ITA	MNZ							NC	0
2024	ACCR Toyota Dolák	Toyota GR Yaris Rally2	MON	SWE	KEN	CRO	POR	ITA	POL	LAT	FIN	GRE	CHL	EUR; 8	JPN	26th	3
