= 2017 ADAC Opel Rallye Cup =

The 2017 ADAC Opel Rallye Cup season is the fifth season of the one-make series for Opel Adam rally cars.

== Calendar ==
No.	Rally	Date	Winner
1	ADAC Hessen Rallye Vogelsberg	7–8 April	Jacob Madsen
2	ADAC Rallye – Rund um die Sulinger Bärenklaue	5–6 May	Tom Kristensson
3	AvD Sachsen-Rallye	26–27 May	Tom Kristensson
4	ADAC Rallye Stemweder Berg	23–24 June	Jacob Madsen
5	ADAC Rallye Deutschland National Day 1	17–18 August	
6	ADAC Rallye Deutschland National Day 2	19–20 August	
7	ADAC Rallye Niedersachsen	8–9 September	
8	ADAC 3-Städte-Rallye	20–21 October	

== Drivers ==
Team	No.	Driver	Rounds
AC Maikammer	38	(Germany) Tim Wacker	1
ADAC Ostwestfalen Lippe e.V.	44	(Germany) Tom Kässer	1
ADAC Ostwestfalen Lippe e.V.	50	(Sweden) Tom Kristensson	1
ADAC Ostwestfalen Lippe e.V.	53	(Germany) Maximilian Schmidt	1
ADAC Pfalz	46	(Germany) Lukas Hein	1
MSC Laichingen e.V.	30	(Germany) Tobias Pohlner	1

== Championship standings ==
Points were awarded to the top 20 finishers on the basis below:

Position	1st	2nd	3rd	4th	5th	6th	7th	8th	9th	10th	11th	12th	13th	14th	15th	16th	17th	18th	19th	20th
Points	35	27	21	17	16	15	14	13	12	11	10	9	8	7	6	5	4	3	2	1

- Additional points were awarded to the top three finishers on each event's Power Stage, on a 3–2–1 basis. Five points were also awarded to the driver with most stage wins at an event.

Pos	Driver	HES	SUL	SAC	STE	DEU	NIE	3ST	Pts
1	(Sweden) Tom Kristensson	2	1	1	2				170
2	(Republic of Ireland) Calvin Beattie	3	2	2	3				199
3	(Denmark) Jacob Madsen	1			1				98
4	(Germany) Nico Knacker	4	14	3	4				76
5	(Slovenia) Tim Novak	7	4	5	8				68
6	(France) Frédéric Hauswald	Ret	3	9	Ret				47
6	(Luxembourg) Gregoire Munster	11	5	12	10				47
8	(Germany) Johannes Dambach	6	Ret	7	6				45
9	(Germany) Philipp Hetz	5	Ret	4	14				44
10	(Italy) Nicola Sartor	Ret	12	6	9				38
11	(Germany) Fabian Rotter	16	10	14	12				32
12	(United Kingdom) Fred Field	Ret	6	17	11				29
13	(Germany) Nino Weiland	14	8	13					28
13	(Germany) Maximilian Schmidt	18	7	10	Ret				28
15	(Germany) Ricardo Sobkowski	17	11	16	13				27
15	(Czech Republic) David Štefan	10	15	11	Ret				27
17	(Belgium) Romain Delhez	12	Ret	Ret	5				26
18	(Germany) Christoph Hilmes	9	Ret	8	Ret				25
19	(Germany) Tom Kässer	8	Ret	Ret	15				22
20	(Belgium) Simon Habran	15	9						18
21	(Germany) Lukas Hein	19	13	15					16
22	(Liechtenstein) Thomas Weirather	Ret	Ret		7				14
23	(Germany) Tim Wacker	13	Ret		16				13
	(Germany) Tobias Pohlner	Ret	Ret	Ret	Ret				0
Pos	Driver	SAA	HES	THÜ	COS	DEU	OST	3ST	Pts

Colour	Result
Gold	Winner
Silver	Second place
Bronze	Third place
Green	Points classification
Blue	Non-points classification
Blue	Non-classified finish (NC)
Purple	Retired, not classified (Ret)
Red	Did not qualify (DNQ)
Red	Did not pre-qualify (DNPQ)
Black	Disqualified (DSQ)
White	Did not start (DNS)
White	Withdrew (WD)
White	Race cancelled (C)
Blank	Did not practice (DNP)
Blank	Did not arrive (DNA)
Blank	Excluded (EX)
