= ADAC Opel Rallye Cup =

- Category: Rallying
- Country: Germany
- Inaugural season: 2013
- Constructors: Opel
- Drivers' champion: (Sweden) Tom Kristensson (2017)
- Official website: ADAC Motorsport

The ADAC Opel Rallye Cup is a rally series in Germany for Opel Adam rally cars, inaugurated in 2013.

The first title was won by Markus Fahrner. In 2014, the title was won by Swede Emil Bergkvist.

The ADAC Opel Rallye Cup has continued to be a key fixture in the German rallying scene, with the Opel Adam R2 remaining a significant car for up-and-coming drivers. The series has since evolved to include more events and higher levels of competition, continuing to offer opportunities for young drivers to showcase their talents.

In 2021, the Opel Adam R2 was replaced by the Opel Corsa Rally4 as the car of choice in the series. This was part of Opel's continued efforts to stay competitive with newer cars that comply with current rally regulations.

The 2025 season of the ADAC Opel Electric Rally Cup, powered by GSE, was highly competitive, with Tom Heindrichs claiming the overall victory. He will now move up to the ADAC Opel Rally Junior Team, competing in the FIA Junior European Rally Championship (JERC).

The 2026 season will feature seven rounds in six countries, including events in the Netherlands, France, Austria, Germany, Italy, and Belgium. Notable highlights include the Rally Sanremo in Italy and the season finale at Rally Spa in Belgium. The new charging infrastructure for the Mokka GSE Rally will allow longer special stage distances and enhance the sustainability of the event.

== 2026 ADAC Opel GSE Rally Cup Schedule ==
1. ELE Rally (Netherlands) - May
2. Rallye Vosges Grand-Est (France) - June
3. Rallye Weiz (Austria) - July
4. ADAC Saarland-Pfalz Rallye (Germany) - August
5. ADAC Rallye Stemweder Berg (Germany) - September
6. Rally Sanremo (Italy) - October
7. Rally Spa (Belgium) - November

Jörg Schrott, Head of Opel Motorsport, highlighted that this schedule is among the most attractive in the series' history. The season promises more international appeal and electrifying rally action.

== Champions ==
Season	Driver	Co-Driver
2013	(Germany) Markus Fahrner	(Germany) Michael Wenzel
2014	(Sweden) Emil Bergkvist	(Sweden) Joakim Sjöberg
2015	(Germany) Julius Tannert	(Luxembourg) Jennifer Thielen
2016	(Finland) Jari Huttunen	(Finland) Antti Linnaketo
2017	(Sweden) Tom Kristensson	(Sweden) Henrik Appelskog
