= 2019 Rally Finland =

Motor rally competition

2019 Rally Rally Finland: 69. Neste Rally Finland
Round 9 of 14 in the 2019 World Rally Championship
← Previous event	Next event →
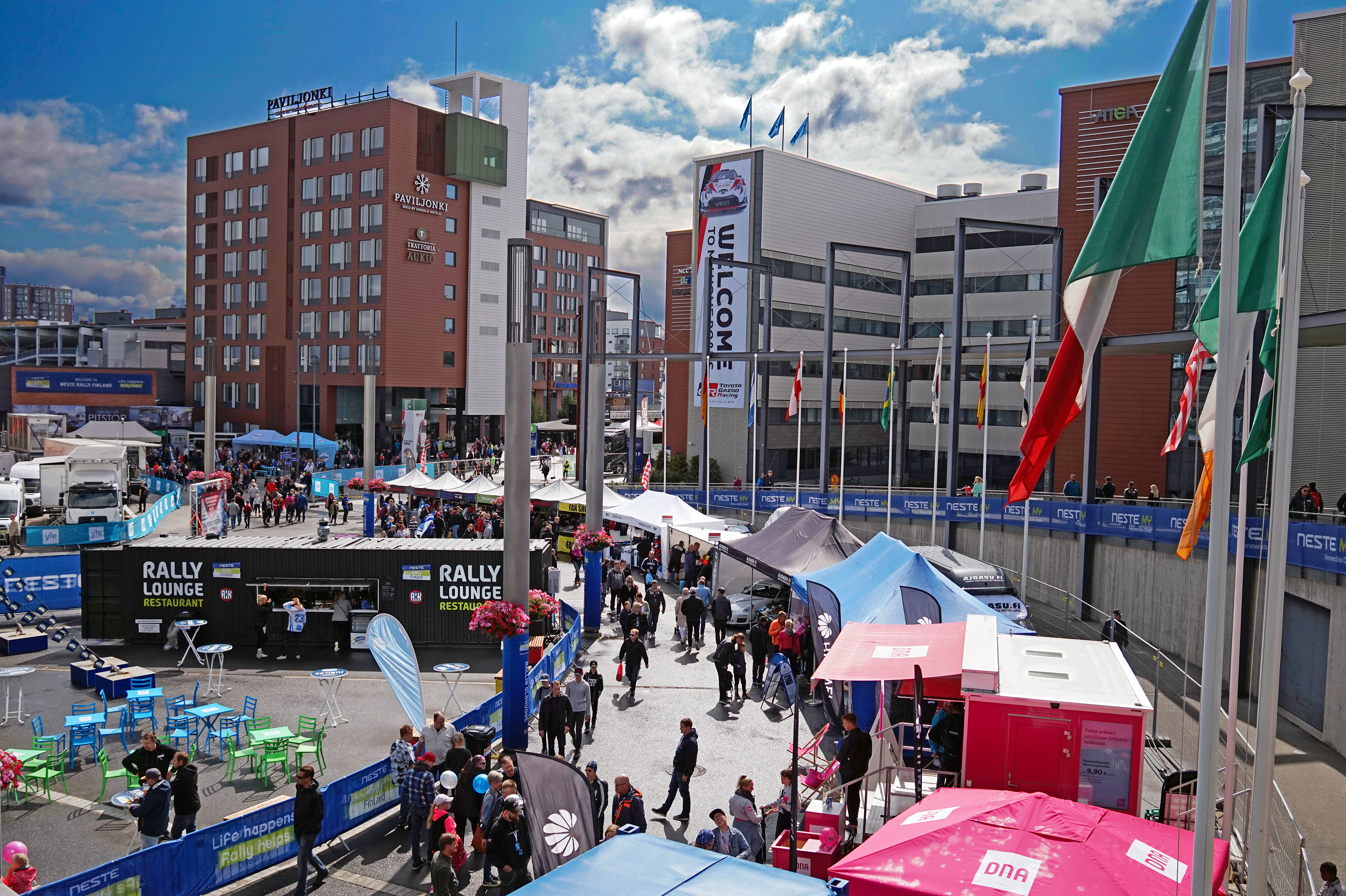
- Rally Finland has the fastest average speed of any event on the calendar.
- Host country: Finland
- Rally base: Jyväskylä, Keski-Suomi
- Dates run: 1 – 4 August 2019
- Start location: Jyväskylä, Keski-Suomi
- Finish location: Ruuhimäki, Toivakka
- Stages: 23 (307.58 km; 191.12 miles)
- Stage surface: Gravel
- Transport distance: 1,066.09 km (662.44 miles)
- Overall distance: 1,373.67 km (853.56 miles)

Statistics
- Crews registered: 65
- Crews: 61 at start, 49 at finish

Overall results
- Overall winner: (Estonia) Ott Tänak (Estonia) Martin Järveoja (Japan) Toyota Gazoo Racing WRT; 2:30:40.3
- Power Stage winner: (Estonia) Ott Tänak (Estonia) Martin Järveoja (Japan) Toyota Gazoo Racing WRT

Support category results
- WRC-2 winner: (Russia) Nikolay Gryazin (Russia) Yaroslav Fedorov (Russia) Nikolay Gryazin; 2:41:09.0
- J-WRC winner: (Sweden) Tom Kristensson (Sweden) Henrik Appelskog (Sweden) Tom Kristensson; 2:55:17.2

The 2019 Rally Finland (also known as Neste Rally Finland 2019) was a motor racing event for rally cars held over four days between 1 and 4 August 2019. It marked the sixty-ninth running of Rally Finland and was the ninth round of the 2019 World Rally Championship, World Rally Championship-2 and the newly created WRC-2 Pro class. It was also the fourth round of the Junior World Rally Championship. The 2019 event was based in Jyväskylä in Keski-Suomi, and was contested over twenty-three special stages with a total a competitive distance of 307.58 km (191.12 mi).

Ott Tänak and Martin Järveoja were the defending rally winners. Their team, Toyota Gazoo Racing WRT, were the defending manufacturers' winners. The local crew of Eerik Pietarinen and Juhana Raitanen were the defending winners in the World Rally Championship-2 category, but they did not defend their titles as they were promoted to the newly created WRC-2 Pro class by Škoda Motorsport. The Estonian crew of Ken Torn and Kuldar Sikk were the reigning winners of the Junior World Rally Championship, but they did not compete the rally.

Tänak and Järveoja successfully defended their titles, adding their winning number to double figures. Their team, Toyota Gazoo Racing WRT, won the rally three years in a row. Local youngster Kalle Rovanperä and Jonne Halttunen took their fourth consecutive victory in the WRC-2 Pro category, finishing first in the combined WRC-2 category, while the Russian crew of Nikolay Gryazin and Yaroslav Fedorov won the wider WRC-2 class as well as snatching their first WRC point. Tom Kristensson and Henrik Appelskog took their second victory of the season in the junior category to regain the championship lead.

== Background ==
=== Championship standings prior to the event ===
Ott Tänak and Martin Järveoja led both the drivers' and co-drivers' championships by three-points ahead of defending world champions Sébastien Ogier and Julien Ingrassia. Thierry Neuville and Nicolas Gilsoul were third, a further three points behind. In the World Rally Championship for Manufacturers, Hyundai Shell Mobis WRT held a forty-four-point lead over Toyota Gazoo Racing WRT.

In the World Rally Championship-2 Pro standings, Kalle Rovanperä and Jonne Halttunen held a thirteen-point lead ahead of Mads Østberg and Torstein Eriksen in the drivers' and co-drivers' standings respectively. Gus Greensmith and Elliott Edmondson were third, another thirteen points further back. In the manufacturers' championship, Škoda Motorsport and M-Sport Ford WRT tied with same points, with Citroën Total sixty-one points behind in third.

In the World Rally Championship-2 standings, Benito Guerra and Jaime Zapata led the drivers' and co-drivers' standings by eighteen points respectively. Pierre-Louis Loubet and Vincent Landais were second, following by Ole Christian Veiby and Jonas Andersson in third.

In the Junior-World Rally Championship standings, Jan Solans and Mauro Barreiro led Tom Kristensson and Henrik Appelskog by nine points in the drivers' and co-drivers' standings respectively, with Dennis Rådström and Johan Johansson six points further behind in third in their own standings. In the Nations' standings, Sweden were first, six points cleared of Spain, with Germany eighteen points further behind in third.

=== Entry list ===
The following crews entered into the rally. The event opened to crews competing in the World Rally Championship, World Rally Championship-2, WRC-2 Pro, Junior World Rally Championship and privateer entries not registered to score points in any championship. A total of sixty-five entries were received, with eleven crews entered with World Rally Cars and thirteen entered the World Rally Championship-2. Three crews were nominated to score points in the Pro class. A further fourteen entries were received for the Junior World Rally Championship.

No.	Driver	Co-Driver	Entrant	Car	Tyre
World Rally Car entries
1	(France) Sébastien Ogier	(France) Julien Ingrassia	(France) Citroën Total WRT	Citroën C3 WRC	MI
3	(Finland) Teemu Suninen	(Finland) Jarmo Lehtinen	(United Kingdom) M-Sport Ford WRT	Ford Fiesta WRC	MI
4	(Finland) Esapekka Lappi	(Finland) Janne Ferm	(France) Citroën Total WRT	Citroën C3 WRC	MI
5	(United Kingdom) Kris Meeke	(United Kingdom) Sebastian Marshall	(Japan) Toyota Gazoo Racing WRT	Toyota Yaris WRC	MI
8	(Estonia) Ott Tänak	(Estonia) Martin Järveoja	(Japan) Toyota Gazoo Racing WRT	Toyota Yaris WRC	MI
10	(Finland) Jari-Matti Latvala	(Finland) Miikka Anttila	(Japan) Toyota Gazoo Racing WRT	Toyota Yaris WRC	MI
11	(Belgium) Thierry Neuville	(Belgium) Nicolas Gilsoul	(South Korea) Hyundai Shell Mobis WRT	Hyundai i20 Coupe WRC	MI
18	(Finland) Jouni Virtanen	(Finland) Risto Pietiläinen	(Finland) JanPro	Ford Fiesta WRC	MI
33	(United Kingdom) Gus Greensmith	(United Kingdom) Elliott Edmondson	(United Kingdom) M-Sport Ford WRT	Ford Fiesta WRC	MI
42	(Republic of Ireland) Craig Breen	(Republic of Ireland) Paul Nagle	(South Korea) Hyundai Shell Mobis WRT	Hyundai i20 Coupe WRC	MI
89	(Norway) Andreas Mikkelsen	(Norway) Anders Jæger-Amland	(South Korea) Hyundai Shell Mobis WRT	Hyundai i20 Coupe WRC	MI
World Rally Championship-2 Pro entries
21	(Finland) Kalle Rovanperä	(Finland) Jonne Halttunen	(Czech Republic) Škoda Motorsport	Škoda Fabia R5 Evo	MI
23	(Finland) Eerik Pietarinen	(Finland) Juhana Raitanen	(Czech Republic) Škoda Motorsport (Note: Entry run in conjunction with TGS Worldwide.)	Škoda Fabia R5 Evo	MI
24	(France) Eric Camilli	(France) Benjamin Veillas	(United Kingdom) M-Sport Ford WRT	Ford Fiesta R5	MI
World Rally Championship-2 entries
41	(France) Pierre-Louis Loubet	(France) Vincent Landais	(France) Pierre-Louis Loubet (Note: Entry operated by Qatar 2C World Rally Team.)	Škoda Fabia R5 Evo	MI
43	(Japan) Takamoto Katsuta	(United Kingdom) Daniel Barritt	(Japan) Takamoto Katsuta (Note: Entry operated by Tommi Mäkinen Racing.)	Ford Fiesta R5	P
44	(Russia) Nikolay Gryazin	(Russia) Yaroslav Fedorov	(Russia) Nikolay Gryazin (Note: Entry operated by Sports Racing Technologies.)	Škoda Fabia R5	MI
45	(Norway) Henning Solberg	(Austria) Ilka Minor	(Norway) Henning Solberg (Note: Entry operated by Toksport World Rally Team.)	Škoda Fabia R5	MI
46	(Brazil) Paulo Nobre	(Brazil) Gabriel Morales	(Brazil) Paulo Nobre (Note: Entry operated by Palmeirinha Rally.)	Škoda Fabia R5	P
47	(Finland) Emil Lindholm	(Finland) Mikael Korhonen	(Finland) Emil Lindholm (Note: Entry operated by Printsport.)	Volkswagen Polo GTI R5	MI
48	(Sweden) Johan Kristoffersson	(Norway) Stig Rune Skjærmoen	(Sweden) Johan Kristoffersson (Note: Entry operated by Volkswagen Dealerteam Bauhaus.)	Volkswagen Polo GTI R5	P
49	(Finland) Jari Huttunen	(Finland) Antti Linnaketo	(Finland) Jari Huttunen (Note: Entry operated by Hyundai Slovenija.)	Hyundai i20 R5	P
50	(Finland) Tomi Tukiainen	(Finland) Mikko Pohjanharju	(Finland) Tomi Tukiainen	Škoda Fabia R5	MI
51	(Belgium) Grégoire Munster	(Belgium) Louis Louka	(Belgium) Grégoire Munster	Škoda Fabia R5	P
Junior World Rally Championship entries
71	(Spain) Jan Solans	(Spain) Mauro Barreiro	Rally Team Spain	Ford Fiesta R2	P
72	(Sweden) Tom Kristensson	(Sweden) Henrik Appelskog	(Sweden) Tom Kristensson	Ford Fiesta R2	P
73	(Sweden) Dennis Rådström	(Sweden) Johan Johansson	(Sweden) Dennis Rådström	Ford Fiesta R2	P
74	(Germany) Julius Tannert	(Austria) Jürgen Heigl	(Germany) ADAC Sachsen	Ford Fiesta R2	P
75	(Estonia) Roland Poom	(Estonia) Ken Järveoja	(Estonia) Roland Poom	Ford Fiesta R2	P
76	(United Kingdom) Tom Williams	(United Kingdom) Phil Hall	(United Kingdom) Tom Williams	Ford Fiesta R2	P
77	(Latvia) Mārtiņš Sesks	(Latvia) Krišjānis Caune	(Latvia) LMT Autosporta Akadēmija	Ford Fiesta R2	P
78	(Romania) Raul Badiu	(Romania) Gabriel Lazăr	(Romania) Raul Badiu	Ford Fiesta R2	P
79	(Italy) Enrico Oldrati	(Italy) Elia De Guio	(Italy) Enrico Oldrati	Ford Fiesta R2	P
80	(United States) Sean Johnston	(United States) Alex Kihurani	(United States) Sean Johnston	Ford Fiesta R2	P
81	(Paraguay) Fabrizio Zaldivar	(Argentina) Fernando Mussano	(Paraguay) Fabrizio Zaldivar	Ford Fiesta R2	P
82	(Germany) Nico Knacker	(Germany) Michael Wenzel	(Germany) ADAC Weser-Ems	Ford Fiesta R2	P
83	(Finland) Sami Pajari	(Finland) Antti Haapala	(Finland) Team Flying Finn	Ford Fiesta R2	P
84	(Finland) Aleksi Röyhkiö	(Finland) Ville Mannisenmäki	(Finland) Aleksi Röyhkiö	Ford Fiesta R2	P
Other Major Entries
105	(France) Adrien Fourmaux	(Belgium) Renaud Jamoul	(France) Adrien Fourmaux	Ford Fiesta R2	MI

=== Route ===
There were no significant changes to the route for the 2019 event outside some slight length reductions to selected stages.

==== Itinerary ====
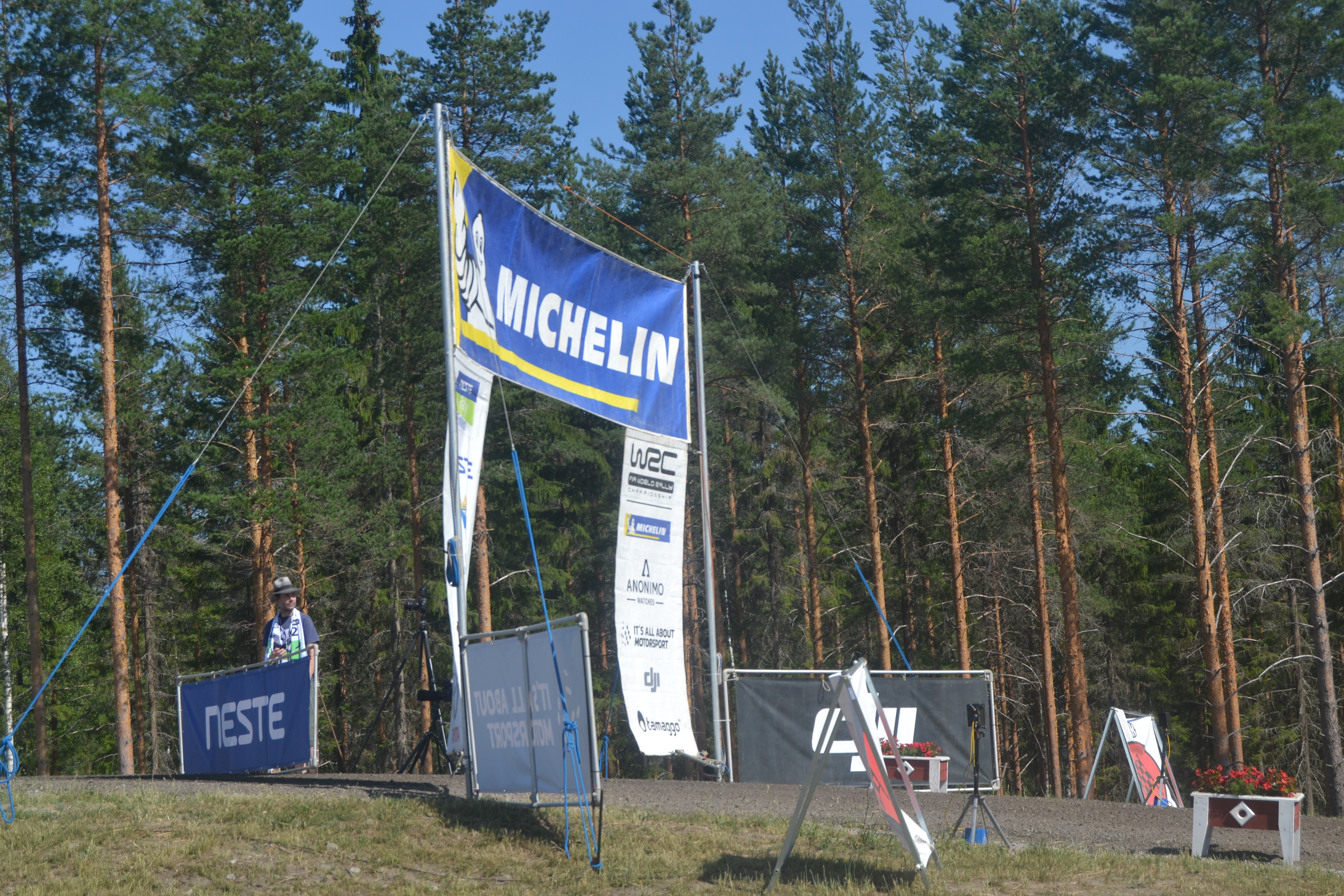
The finishing line of the Ruuhimäki stage, marking as end location of Rally Finland.

All dates and times are EEST (UTC+3).

Date	Time	No.	Stage name	Distance
1 August	09:00	—	Vesala [Shakedown]	4.26 km
Leg 1 — 128.86 km
1 August	19:00	SS1	Harju 1	2.31 km
2 August	8:18	SS2	Oittila	19.34 km
2 August	9:21	SS3	Moksi 1	20.04 km
2 August	10:24	SS4	Urria 1	12.28 km
2 August	11:16	SS5	Ässämäki 1	12.33 km
2 August	12:39	SS6	Äänekoski 1	7.80 km
2 August	15:24	SS7	Moksi 2	20.04 km
2 August	16:27	SS8	Urria 2	12.28 km
2 August	17:19	SS9	Ässämäki 2	12.33 km
2 August	18:42	SS10	Äänekoski 2	7.80 km
2 August	20:00	SS11	Harju 2	2.31 km
Leg 2 — 132.98 km
3 August	8:08	SS12	Pihlajakoski 1	14.42 km
3 August	9:10	SS13	Päijälä 1	22.87 km
3 August	10:08	SS14	Kakaristo 1	18.70 km
3 August	11:34	SS15	Leustu 1	10.50 km
3 August	15:08	SS16	Pihlajakoski 2	14.42 km
3 August	16:10	SS17	Päijälä 2	22.87 km
3 August	17:08	SS18	Kakaristo 2	18.70 km
3 August	18:34	SS19	Leustu 2	10.50 km
Leg 3 — 45.74 km
4 August	8:38	SS20	Laukaa 1	11.75 km
4 August	9:38	SS21	Ruuhimäki 1	11.12 km
4 August	11:01	SS22	Laukaa 2	11.75 km
4 August	13:18	SS23	Ruuhimäki 2 [Power Stage]	11.12 km

== Report ==
=== World Rally Cars ===
Elfyn Evans and Scott Martin were entered by M-Sport Ford WRT, but were later withdrawn when Evans was injured contesting Rally Estonia as part of their pre-event preparations. Gus Greensmith and Elliott Edmondson were withdrawn from the WRC 2-Pro category and re-entered in Evans' and Martin's place. Hayden Paddon and John Kennard were entered into the rally by M-Sport Ford WRT, but they were withdrawn after a heavy crash during testing that caused irreparable damage their car.

It was a drama-free Friday for front runners, with Jari-Matti Latvala took a narrow lead into the second leg. However, the local Finn punctured his rear-left tyre in a right-hand corner, which dropped him down to third. Teammate Kris Meeke also ran into trouble at the same corner, but damage to the rear-left suspension forced the Northern Irishman retired from the day. Despite re-entering the rally on the final day, he still had to retire as he stopped again when he hit a rock. Gus Greensmith's rally ended his rally on SS20 after crashing into a tree.

The rally was easily won by Ott Tänak, who won his tenth rally in his WRC career as well as winning his 200th stage victory during the event.

==== Classification ====
Position		No.	Driver	Co-driver	Entrant	Car	Time	Difference	Points	
Event	Class	No.	Driver	Co-driver	Entrant	Car	Time	Difference	Event	Stage
1	1	8	Ott Tänak	Martin Järveoja	Toyota Gazoo Racing WRT	Toyota Yaris WRC	2:30:40.3	0.0	25	5
2	2	4	Esapekka Lappi	Janne Ferm	Citroën Total WRT	Citroën C3 WRC	2:31:05.9	+25.6	18	0
3	3	10	Jari-Matti Latvala	Miikka Anttila	Toyota Gazoo Racing WRT	Toyota Yaris WRC	2:31:13.5	+33.2	15	1
4	4	89	Andreas Mikkelsen	Anders Jæger-Amland	Hyundai Shell Mobis WRT	Hyundai i20 Coupe WRC	2:31:33.7	+53.4	12	3
5	5	1	Sébastien Ogier	Julien Ingrassia	Citroën Total WRT	Citroën C3 WRC	2:31:36.4	+56.1	10	2
6	6	11	Thierry Neuville	Nicolas Gilsoul	Hyundai Shell Mobis WRT	Hyundai i20 Coupe WRC	2:32:12.7	+1:32.4	8	4
7	7	42	Craig Breen	Paul Nagle	Hyundai Shell Mobis WRT	Hyundai i20 Coupe WRC	2:32:18.5	+1:38.2	6	0
8	8	3	Teemu Suninen	Marko Salminen	M-Sport Ford WRT	Ford Fiesta WRC	2:33:14.1	+2:33.8	4	0
Retired SS22		5	Kris Meeke	Sebastian Marshall	Toyota Gazoo Racing WRT	Toyota Yaris WRC	Off road		0	0
Retired SS21		33	Gus Greensmith	Elliott Edmondson	M-Sport Ford WRT	Ford Fiesta WRC	Off road		0	0

==== Special stages ====
Date	No.	Stage name	Distance	Winners	Car	Time	Class leaders
1 August	—	Vesala [Shakedown]	4.26 km	Tänak / Järveoja	Toyota Yaris WRC	1:53.8	—N/a
1 August	SS1	Harju 1	2.31 km	Neuville / Gilsoul	Hyundai i20 Coupe WRC	1:47.3	Neuville / Gilsoul
2 August	SS2	Oittila	19.34 km	Latvala / Anttila	Toyota Yaris WRC	9:36.6	Tänak / Järveoja
2 August	SS3	Moksi 1	20.04 km	Meeke / Marshall	Toyota Yaris WRC	9:56.3	Tänak / Järveoja
2 August	SS4	Urria 1	12.28 km	Latvala / Anttila	Toyota Yaris WRC	6:08.0	Tänak / Järveoja
2 August	SS5	Ässämäki 1	12.33 km	Tänak / Järveoja	Toyota Yaris WRC	5:49.7	Tänak / Järveoja
2 August	SS6	Äänekoski 1	7.80 km	Latvala / Anttila	Toyota Yaris WRC	3:38.1	Tänak / Järveoja
2 August	SS7	Moksi 2	20.04 km	Latvala / Anttila	Toyota Yaris WRC	9:45.7	Latvala / Anttila
2 August	SS8	Urria 2	12.28 km	Mikkelsen / Jæger-Amland	Hyundai i20 Coupe WRC	6:02.8	Latvala / Anttila
2 August	SS9	Ässämäki 2	12.33 km	Latvala / Anttila	Toyota Yaris WRC	5:43.8	Latvala / Anttila
2 August	SS10	Äänekoski 2	7.80 km	Meeke / Marshall	Toyota Yaris WRC	3:33.1	Latvala / Anttila
2 August	SS11	Harju 2	2.31 km	Neuville / Gilsoul	Hyundai i20 Coupe WRC	1:48.3	Latvala / Anttila
3 August	SS12	Pihlajakoski 1	14.42 km	Tänak / Järveoja	Toyota Yaris WRC	7:30.0	Tänak / Järveoja
3 August	SS13	Päijälä 1	22.87 km	Meeke / Marshall	Toyota Yaris WRC	10:37.4	Latvala / Anttila
3 August	SS14	Kakaristo 1	18.70 km	Tänak / Järveoja	Toyota Yaris WRC	9:00.1	Tänak / Järveoja
3 August	SS15	Leustu 1	10.50 km	Latvala / Anttila	Toyota Yaris WRC	5:27.2	Tänak / Järveoja
3 August	SS16	Pihlajakoski 2	14.42 km	Lappi / Ferm	Citroën C3 WRC	7:21.5	Tänak / Järveoja
3 August	SS17	Päijälä 2	22.87 km	Tänak / Järveoja	Toyota Yaris WRC	10:28.9	Tänak / Järveoja
3 August	SS18	Kakaristo 2	18.70 km	Lappi / Ferm	Citroën C3 WRC	8:51.5	Tänak / Järveoja
3 August	SS19	Leustu 2	10.50 km	Mikkelsen / Jæger-Amland	Hyundai i20 Coupe WRC	5:22.9	Tänak / Järveoja
4 August	SS20	Laukaa 1	11.75 km	Tänak / Järveoja	Toyota Yaris WRC	5:29.7	Tänak / Järveoja
4 August	SS21	Ruuhimäki 1	11.12 km	Latvala / Anttila	Toyota Yaris WRC	5:30.9	Tänak / Järveoja
4 August	SS22	Laukaa 2	11.75 km	Mikkelsen / Jæger-Amland	Hyundai i20 Coupe WRC	5:23.1	Tänak / Järveoja
4 August	SS23	Ruuhimäki 2 [Power Stage]	11.12 km	Tänak / Järveoja	Toyota Yaris WRC	5:24.3	Tänak / Järveoja

==== Championship standings ====
Pos.	Drivers' championships			Co-drivers' championships			Manufacturers' championships		
Pos.	Move	Driver	Points	Move	Co-driver	Points	Move	Manufacturer	Points
1		Ott Tänak	180		Martin Järveoja	180		Hyundai Shell Mobis WRT	262
2		Sébastien Ogier	158		Julien Ingrassia	158		Toyota Gazoo Racing WRT	238
3		Thierry Neuville	155		Nicolas Gilsoul	155		Citroën Total WRT	198
4		Elfyn Evans	78		Scott Martin	78		M-Sport Ford WRT	158
5	2	Andreas Mikkelsen	71	1	Anders Jæger-Amland	71			

=== World Rally Championship-2 Pro ===
Defending WRC-2 winner Eerik Pietarinen crashed out at the very first of the day and was unable to continue. Kalle Rovanperä was comfortable in the lead and collected his fourth straight WRC-2 Pro victory.

==== Classification ====
Position		No.	Driver	Co-driver	Entrant	Car	Time	Difference	Points	
Event	Class	No.	Driver	Co-driver	Entrant	Car	Time	Difference	Class	Event
9	1	21	Kalle Rovanperä	Jonne Halttunen	Škoda Motorsport	Škoda Fabia R5 Evo	2:38:34.4	0.0	**25**	**2**
13	2	24	Eric Camilli	Benjamin Veillas	M-Sport Ford WRT	Ford Fiesta R5	2:43:21.4	+4:47.0	**18**	**0**
Retired SS2		23	Eerik Pietarinen	Juhana Raitanen	Škoda Motorsport	Škoda Fabia R5 Evo	Accident		**0**	**0**

==== Special stages ====
Results in bold denote first in the RC2 class, the class which both the WRC-2 Pro and WRC-2 championships run to.

Date	No.	Stage name	Distance	Winners	Car	Time	Class leaders
1 August	—	Vesala [Shakedown]	4.26 km	**Rovanperä / Halttunen**	Škoda Fabia R5 Evo	2:01.1	—N/a
1 August	SS1	Harju 1	2.31 km	**Rovanperä / Halttunen**	Škoda Fabia R5 Evo	1:52.1	Rovanperä / Halttunen
2 August	SS2	Oittila	19.34 km	Rovanperä / Halttunen	Škoda Fabia R5 Evo	10:05.5	Rovanperä / Halttunen
2 August	SS3	Moksi 1	20.04 km	**Rovanperä / Halttunen**	Škoda Fabia R5 Evo	10:26.3	Rovanperä / Halttunen
2 August	SS4	Urria 1	12.28 km	**Rovanperä / Halttunen**	Škoda Fabia R5 Evo	6:28.1	Rovanperä / Halttunen
2 August	SS5	Ässämäki 1	12.33 km	**Rovanperä / Halttunen**	Škoda Fabia R5 Evo	6:09.9	Rovanperä / Halttunen
2 August	SS6	Äänekoski 1	7.80 km	**Rovanperä / Halttunen**	Škoda Fabia R5 Evo	3:50.4	Rovanperä / Halttunen
2 August	SS7	Moksi 2	20.04 km	**Rovanperä / Halttunen**	Škoda Fabia R5 Evo	10:12.9	Rovanperä / Halttunen
2 August	SS8	Urria 2	12.28 km	**Rovanperä / Halttunen**	Škoda Fabia R5 Evo	6:22.1	Rovanperä / Halttunen
2 August	SS9	Ässämäki 2	12.33 km	**Rovanperä / Halttunen**	Škoda Fabia R5 Evo	6:04.4	Rovanperä / Halttunen
2 August	SS10	Äänekoski 2	7.80 km	**Rovanperä / Halttunen**	Škoda Fabia R5 Evo	3:46.2	Rovanperä / Halttunen
2 August	SS11	Harju 2	2.31 km	Rovanperä / Halttunen	Škoda Fabia R5 Evo	1:51.8	Rovanperä / Halttunen
3 August	SS12	Pihlajakoski 1	14.42 km	Rovanperä / Halttunen	Škoda Fabia R5 Evo	7:51.5	Rovanperä / Halttunen
3 August	SS13	Päijälä 1	22.87 km	**Rovanperä / Halttunen**	Škoda Fabia R5 Evo	11:16.6	Rovanperä / Halttunen
3 August	SS14	Kakaristo 1	18.70 km	Rovanperä / Halttunen	Škoda Fabia R5 Evo	9:32.7	Rovanperä / Halttunen
3 August	SS15	Leustu 1	10.50 km	**Rovanperä / Halttunen**	Škoda Fabia R5 Evo	5:44.7	Rovanperä / Halttunen
3 August	SS16	Pihlajakoski 2	14.42 km	**Rovanperä / Halttunen**	Škoda Fabia R5 Evo	7:43.9	Rovanperä / Halttunen
3 August	SS17	Päijälä 2	22.87 km	**Rovanperä / Halttunen**	Škoda Fabia R5 Evo	11:04.2	Rovanperä / Halttunen
3 August	SS18	Kakaristo 2	18.70 km	Rovanperä / Halttunen	Škoda Fabia R5 Evo	9:19.1	Rovanperä / Halttunen
3 August	SS19	Leustu 2	10.50 km	**Rovanperä / Halttunen**	Škoda Fabia R5 Evo	5:40.5	Rovanperä / Halttunen
4 August	SS20	Laukaa 1	11.75 km	Rovanperä / Halttunen	Škoda Fabia R5 Evo	5:49.2	Rovanperä / Halttunen
4 August	SS21	Ruuhimäki 1	11.12 km	Rovanperä / Halttunen	Škoda Fabia R5 Evo	5:50.9	Rovanperä / Halttunen
4 August	SS22	Laukaa 2	11.75 km	Rovanperä/ Halttunen	Škoda Fabia R5 Evo	5:42:4	Rovanperä / Halttunen
4 August	SS23	Ruuhimäki 2	11.12 km	Rovanperä/ Halttunen	Škoda Fabia R5 Evo	5:49.0	Rovanperä / Halttunen

==== Championship standings ====
Pos.	Drivers' championships			Co-drivers' championships			Manufacturers' championships		
Pos.	Move	Driver	Points	Move	Co-driver	Points	Move	Manufacturer	Points
1		Kalle Rovanperä	136		Jonne Halttunen	136		Škoda Motorsport	184
2		Mads Østberg	98		Torstein Eriksen	98		M-Sport Ford WRT	177
3		Gus Greensmith	85		Elliott Edmondson	85		Citroën Total	98
4		Łukasz Pieniążek	74		Kamil Heller	62			
5		Jan Kopecký	36		Pavel Dresler	36			

=== World Rally Championship-2 ===
Local driver Emil Lindholm led the category before he crashed out in the second stage. Pierre-Louis Loubet led the class until the last stage of leg two, when he misheard a pace note and smashed into a tree. Eventually, Nikolay Gryazin snatched his first victory of the class after a consistent weekend.

==== Classification ====
Position		No.	Driver	Co-driver	Entrant	Car	Time	Difference	Points	
Event	Class	No.	Driver	Co-driver	Entrant	Car	Time	Difference	Class	Event
10	1	44	Nikolay Gryazin	Yaroslav Fedorov	Nikay Gryazin	Škoda Fabia R5	2:41:09.0	0.0	25	1
11	2	48	Jari Huttunen	Antti Linnaketo	Jari Huttunen	Hyundai i20 R5	2:41:23.0	+14.0	18	0
12	3	49	Johan Kristoffersson	Stig Rune Skjærmoen	Johan Kristoffersson	Volkswagen Polo GTI R5	2:43:12.8	+1:49.8	15	0
14	4	41	Pierre-Louis Loubet	Vincent Landais	Pierre-Louis Loubet	Škoda Fabia R5 Evo	2:47:53.5	+4:40.7	12	0
15	5	45	Henning Solberg	Ilka Minor	Henning Solberg	Škoda Fabia R5 Evo	2:51:55.8	+10:46.8	10	0
31	6	46	Paulo Nobre	Gabriel Morales	Paulo Nobre	Škoda Fabia R5	3:16:20.0	+35:11.0	8	0
43	7	47	Emil Lindholm	Mikael Korhonen	Emil Lindholm	Volkswagen Polo GTI R5	3:53:43.9	+1:12:34.9	6	0
45	8	51	Grégoire Munster	Louis Louka	Grégoire Munster	Škoda Fabia R5	4:06:54.8	+1:25:45.8	4	0
Retired SS12		43	Takamoto Katsuta	Daniel Barritt	Takamoto Katsuta	Ford Fiesta R5	Lost wheel		0	0
Retired SS6		50	Tomi Tukiainen	Mikko Pohjanharju	Tomi Tukiainen	Škoda Fabia R5	Accident		0	0

==== Special stages ====
Results in bold denote first in the RC2 class, the class which both the WRC-2 Pro and WRC-2 championships run to.

Date	No.	Stage name	Distance	Winners	Car	Time	Class leaders
1 August	—	Vesala [Shakedown]	4.26 km	Loubet / Landais	Škoda Fabia R5	2:02.9	—N/a
1 August	SS1	Harju 1	2.31 km	Kristoffersson / Skjærmoen	Volkswagen Polo GTI R5	1:53.2	Kristoffersson / Skjærmoen
2 August	SS2	Oittila	19.34 km	**Lindholm / Korhonen**	Volkswagen Polo GTI R5	10:02.7	Lindholm / Korhonen
2 August	SS3	Moksi 1	20.04 km	Loubet / Landais	Škoda Fabia R5	10:29.2	Loubet / Landais
2 August	SS4	Urria 1	12.28 km	Loubet / Landais	Škoda Fabia R5	6:31.4	Loubet / Landais
2 August	SS5	Ässämäki 1	12.33 km	Loubet / Landais	Škoda Fabia R5	6:11.2	Loubet / Landais
2 August	SS6	Äänekoski 1	7.80 km	Loubet / Landais	Škoda Fabia R5	3:50.5	Loubet / Landais
2 August	SS7	Moksi 2	20.04 km	Loubet / Landais	Škoda Fabia R5	10:17.8	Loubet / Landais
2 August	SS8	Urria 2	12.28 km	Loubet / Landais	Škoda Fabia R5	6:25.8	Loubet / Landais
2 August	SS9	Ässämäki 2	12.33 km	Gryazin / Fedorov	Škoda Fabia R5	6:07.1	Loubet / Landais
2 August	SS10	Äänekoski 2	7.80 km	Landais / Loubet; Huttunen / Linnaketo	Škoda Fabia R5 Evo; Hyundai i20 R5	3:46.7	Loubet / Landais
2 August	SS11	Harju 2	2.31 km	**Kristoffersson / Skjærmoen**	Volkswagen Polo GTI R5	1:51.6	Loubet / Landais
3 August	SS12	Pihlajakoski 1	14.42 km	**Lindholm / Korhonen**	Volkswagen Polo GTI R5	7:50.6	Loubet / Landais
3 August	SS13	Päijälä 1	22.87 km	Huttunen / Linnaketo	Hyundai i20 R5	11:19.4	Loubet / Landais
3 August	SS14	Kakaristo 1	18.70 km	**Lindholm / Korhonen**	Volkswagen Polo GTI R5	9:28.7	Loubet / Landais
3 August	SS15	Leustu 1	10.50 km	Huttunen / Linnaketo	Hyundai i20 R5	5:46.0	Loubet / Landais
3 August	SS16	Pihlajakoski 2	14.42 km	Lindholm / Korhonen	Volkswagen Polo GTI R5	7:45.2	Loubet / Landais
3 August	SS17	Päijälä 2	22.87 km	**Lindholm / Korhonen**	Volkswagen Polo GTI R5	11:04.2	Loubet / Landais
3 August	SS18	Kakaristo 2	18.70 km	**Lindholm / Korhonen**	Volkswagen Polo GTI R5	9:18.7	Loubet / Landais
3 August	SS19	Leustu 2	10.50 km	Gryazin / Fedorov	Škoda Fabia R5	5:46.2	Gryazin / Fedorov
4 August	SS20	Laukaa 1	11.75 km	**Lindholm / Korhonen**	Volkswagen Polo GTI R5	5:46.8	Gryazin / Fedorov
4 August	SS21	Ruuhimäki 1	11.12 km	**Lindholm / Korhonen**	Volkswagen Polo GTI R5	5:49.2	Gryazin / Fedorov
4 August	SS22	Laukaa 2	11.75 km	**Lindholm / Korhonen**	Volkswagen Polo GTI R5	5:40.8	Gryazin / Fedorov
4 August	SS23	Ruuhimäki 2	11.12 km	**Lindholm / Korhonen**	Volkswagen Polo GTI R5	5:46.6	Gryazin / Fedorov

==== Championship standings ====
Pos.	Drivers' championships			Co-drivers' championships		
Pos.	Move	Driver	Points	Move	Co-driver	Points
1		Benito Guerra	69		Jaime Zapata	69
2		Pierre-Louis Loubet	63		Vincent Landais	63
3	2	Nikolay Gryazin	63	2	Yaroslav Fedorov	63
4	1	Ole Christian Veiby	50	1	Jonas Andersson	50
5	1	Takamoto Katsuta	47	1	Daniel Barritt	47

=== Junior World Rally Championship ===
Raul Badiu heavily crashed his Ford Fiesta R2, suffering two fractured ribs and a concussion. The Romanian was forced to retire from the rally and received medical treatment. Roland Poom and Jürgen Heigl was the two major retirements in the second leg. Dennis Rådström could have taken some good points from the event, but the crash in the penultimate stage means he was thirty-four points off the lead. Compatriot Tom Kristensson took the victory with eight stage victories to retake the championship lead.

==== Classification ====
Position		No.	Driver	Co-driver	Entrant	Car	Time	Difference	Points	
Event	Class	No.	Driver	Co-driver	Entrant	Car	Time	Difference	Class	Stage
17	1	72	Tom Kristensson	Henrik Appelskog	Tom Kristensson	Ford Fiesta R2	2:55:17.2	0.0	25	8
18	2	71	Jan Solans	Mauro Barreiro	Rally Team Spain	Ford Fiesta R2	2:56:45.2	+1:28.0	18	5
24	3	75	Roland Poom	Ken Järveoja	Roland Poom	Ford Fiesta R2	3:07:12.0	+11:54.8	15	0
26	4	84	Aleksi Röyhkiö	Ville Mannisenmäki	Aleksi Röyhkiö	Ford Fiesta R5	3:08:42.4	+13:25.2	12	0
27	5	80	Sean Johnston	Alex Kihurani	Sean Johnston	Ford Fiesta R5	3:08:59.5	+13:42.3	10	0
30	6	79	Enrico Oldrati	Elia De Guio	Enrico Oldrati	Ford Fiesta R2	3:14:55.6	+19:38.4	8	0
37	7	82	Nico Knacker	Tobias Braun	ADAC Weser-Ems	Ford Fiesta R2	3:34:09.8	+38:52.6	6	0
41	8	81	Fabrizio Zaldívar	Fernando Mussano	Fabrizio Zaldívar	Ford Fiesta R2	3:48:56.5	+53:39.3	4	0
42	9	77	Mārtiņš Sesks	Krišjānis Caune	LMT Autosporta Akadēmija	Ford Fiesta R5	3:51:48.9	+56:31.7	2	2
48	10	76	Tom Williams	Phil Hall	Tom Williams	Ford Fiesta R2	4:15:19.9	+1:20:02.7	1	0
Retired SS21		73	Dennis Rådström	Johan Johansson	Dennis Rådström	Ford Fiesta R2	Mechanical		0	5
Retired SS18		74	Julius Tannert	Jürgen Heigl	ADAC Sachsen E.V	Ford Fiesta R2	Rolled		0	1
Retired SS16		83	Sami Pajari	Antti Haapala	Team Flying Finn	Ford Fiesta R2	Lost Wheel		0	2
Retired SS6		78	Raul Badiu	Gabriel Lazăr	Raul Badiu	Ford Fiesta R2	Accident		0	0

==== Special stages ====
Date	No.	Stage name	Distance	Winners	Car	Time	Class leaders
1 August	—	Vesala [Shakedown]	4.26 km	Kristensson / Appelskog	Ford Fiesta R2	2:16.7	—N/a
1 August	SS1	Harju 1	2.31 km	Tannert / Heigl	Ford Fiesta R2	2:08.9	Tannert / Heigl
2 August	SS2	Oittila	19.34 km	Kristensson / Appelskog	Ford Fiesta R2	11:03.9	Kristensson / Appelskog
2 August	SS3	Moksi 1	20.04 km	Pajari / Haapala	Ford Fiesta R2	11:30.1	Kristensson / Appelskog
2 August	SS4	Urria 1	12.28 km	Solans / Barreiro	Ford Fiesta R2	7:08.8	Kristensson / Appelskog
2 August	SS5	Ässämäki 1	12.33 km	Kristensson / Appelskog	Ford Fiesta R2	6:47.4	Kristensson / Appelskog
2 August	SS6	Äänekoski 1	7.80 km	Kristensson / Appelskog	Ford Fiesta R2	4:09.7	Kristensson / Appelskog
2 August	SS7	Moksi 2	20.04 km	Rådström / Johansson	Ford Fiesta R2	11:20.6	Kristensson / Appelskog
2 August	SS8	Urria 2	12.28 km	Solans / Barreiro	Ford Fiesta R2	7:05.8	Kristensson / Appelskog
2 August	SS9	Ässämäki 2	12.33 km	Kristensson / Appelskog	Ford Fiesta R2	6:37.5	Kristensson / Appelskog
2 August	SS10	Äänekoski 2	7.80 km	Solans / Barreiro	Ford Fiesta R2	4:07.2	Kristensson / Appelskog
2 August	SS11	Harju 2	2.31 km	Sesks / Caune	Ford Fiesta R2	2:05.4	Kristensson / Appelskog
3 August	SS12	Pihlajakoski 1	14.42 km	Rådström / Johansson	Ford Fiesta R2	8:39.5	Kristensson / Appelskog
3 August	SS13	Päijälä 1	22.87 km	Pajari / Haapala	Ford Fiesta R2	12:10.8	Kristensson / Appelskog
3 August	SS14	Kakaristo 1	18.70 km	Kristensson / Appelskog	Ford Fiesta R2	10:23.2	Kristensson / Appelskog
3 August	SS15	Leustu 1	10.50 km	Solans / Barreiro	Ford Fiesta R2	6:20.0	Kristensson / Appelskog
3 August	SS16	Pihlajakoski 2	14.42 km	Rådström / Johansson	Ford Fiesta R2	8:32.8	Kristensson / Appelskog
3 August	SS17	Päijälä 2	22.87 km	Rådström / Johansson	Ford Fiesta R2	12:06.6	Kristensson / Appelskog
3 August	SS18	Kakaristo 2	18.70 km	Rådström / Johansson	Ford Fiesta R2	10:13.4	Kristensson / Appelskog
3 August	SS19	Leustu 2	10.50 km	Kristensson / Appelskog	Ford Fiesta R2	6:19.7	Kristensson / Appelskog
4 August	SS20	Laukaa 1	11.75 km	Kristensson / Appelskog	Ford Fiesta R2	6:25.2	Kristensson / Appelskog
4 August	SS21	Ruuhimäki 1	11.12 km	Solans / Barreiro	Ford Fiesta R2	6:29.0	Kristensson / Appelskog
4 August	SS22	Laukaa 2	11.75 km	Kristensson / Appelskog	Ford Fiesta R2	6:14.1	Kristensson / Appelskog
4 August	SS23	Ruuhimäki 2	11.12 km	Sesks / Caune	Ford Fiesta R2	6:26.0	Kristensson / Appelskog

==== Championship standings ====
Pos.	Drivers' championships			Co-drivers' championships			Nations' championships		
Pos.	Move	Driver	Points	Move	Co-driver	Points	Move	Country	Points
1	1	Tom Kristensson	95	1	Henrik Appelskog	95		Sweden	86
2	1	Jan Solans	94	1	Mauro Barreiro	94		Spain	73
3		Dennis Rådström	61		Johan Johansson	61	1	Germany	43
4	1	Roland Poom	41	1	Ken Järveoja	41	1	Estonia	43
5	1	Julius Tannert	36	1	Jürgen Heigl	36	3	Italy	26

== Notes ==
Previous rally: 2019 Rally Italia Sardegna	2019 FIA World Rally Championship	Next rally: 2019 Rallye Deutschland
Previous rally: 2018 Rally Finland	2019 Rally Finland	Next rally: 2021 Rally Finland; 2020 edition cancelled
