= Tom Kristensson =

Swedish rally driver

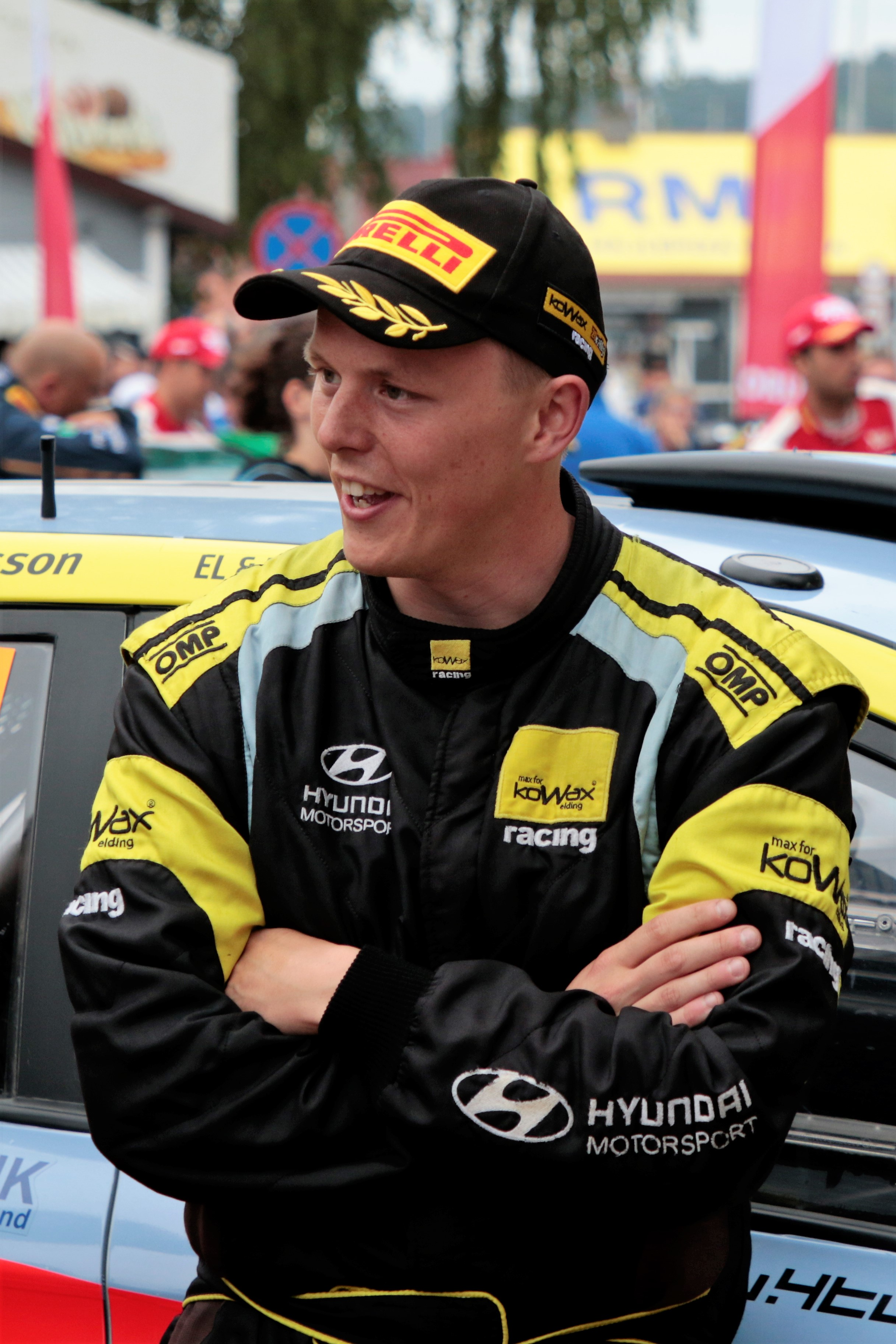
- Kristensson at the 2022 Rally Poland

Personal information
- Nationality: Swedish
- Born: 30 April 1991 (age 35); Lund, Sweden

World Rally Championship record
- Years active: 2018–present
- Teams: M-Sport
- Rallies: 15
- Championships: 0
- Rally wins: 0
- Podiums: 0
- Stage wins: 0
- Total points: 0
- First rally: 2018 Rallye Deutschland

Tom Krister Kristensson (born 30 April 1991) is a Swedish rally driver, who drives in the Junior World Rally Championship. He is originally from Lund, but now lives in Hörby.

In 2016 and 2017, Kristensson competed in the ADAC Opel Rallye Cup, finishing second in 2016 and winning 2017 championship.

In the 2019 season of JWRC, Kristensson finished second behind Jan Solans. The next season, he went on to become the 2020 Junior World Rally champion.

In 2022, Kristensson transitioned to the ERC where in his first season he finished sixteenth. He continued to race in the ERC in 2023 however, after his retirement in Poland, he decided to drop out of the championship.

== Career results ==
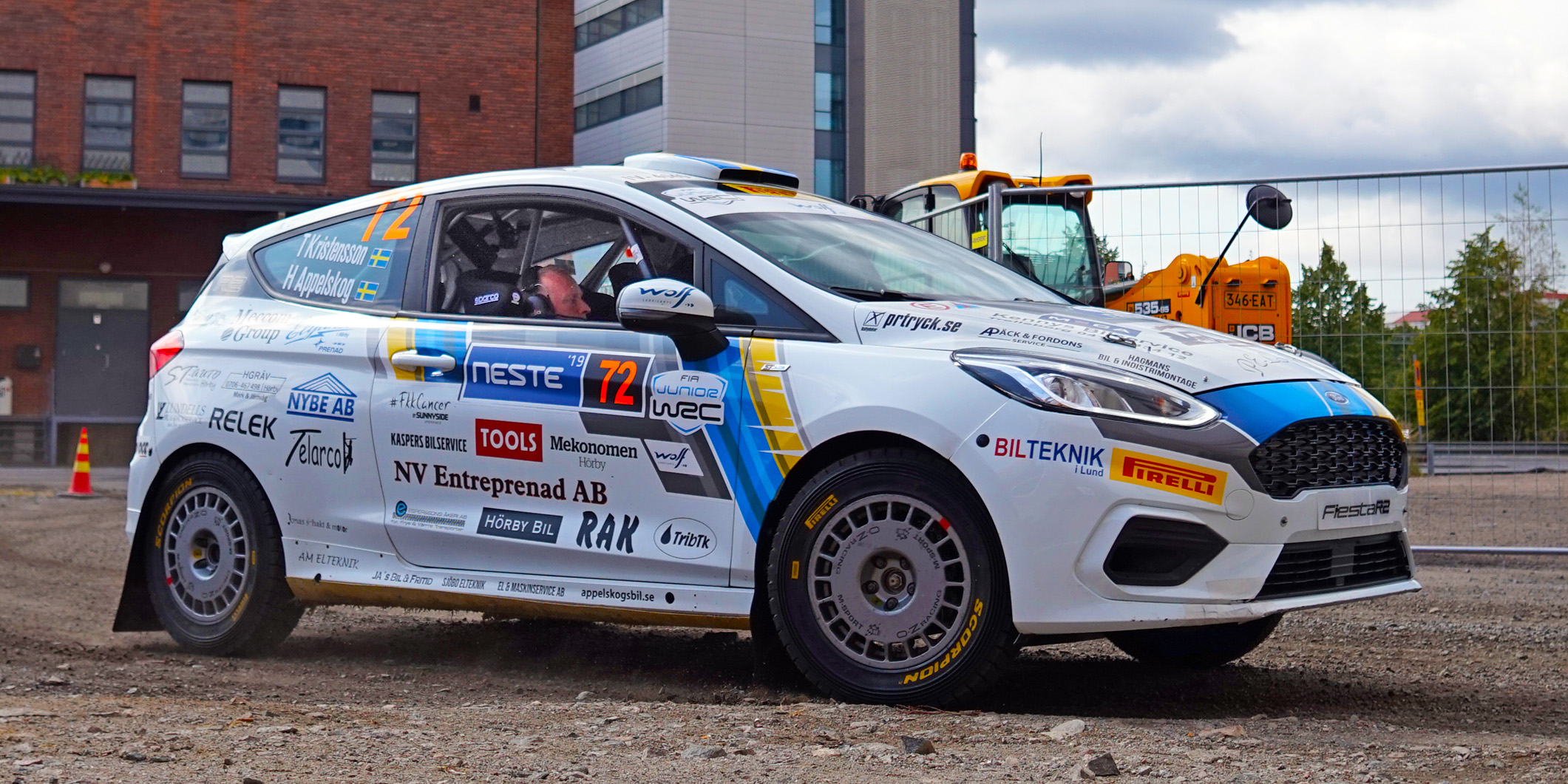
Kristensson's Ford Fiesta R2 in the service park at 2019 Rally Finland.

=== ADAC Opel Rallye Cup results ===
Year	Entrant	Car	1	2	3	4	5	6	7	8	Pos.	Points
2016	ADAC Ostwestfalen Lippe e.V.	Opel Adam R2	SAA; 3	HES; Ret	SUL; 2	THÜ; 2	DEU; 2	DEU; 6	3ST; 2		2nd	152
2017	ADAC Ostwestfalen Lippe e.V.	Opel Adam R2	HES; 2	SUL; 1	SAC; 1	STE; 2	DEU; Ret	DEU; 8	NIE; 2	3ST; 2	1st	170

=== JWRC results ===
Year	Entrant	Car	1	2	3	4	5	Pos.	Points
2019	Tom Kristensson	Ford Fiesta R2	SWE; 1	FRA; 2	ITA; 3	FIN; 1	GBR; 2	2nd	118
2020	Tom Kristensson Motorsport	Ford Fiesta R2	SWE; 1	EST; Ret	ITA; 1	MNZ; 1		1st	100.5

=== WRC-2 results ===
Year	Entrant	Car	1	2	3	4	5	6	7	8	9	10	11	12	Pos.	Points
2021	M-Sport Ford WRT	Ford Fiesta R5	MON	ARC	CRO; Ret	POR; 9	ITA	KEN	EST; 5	BEL; Ret	GRE	FIN; Ret	ESP	MNZ	15th	13

=== WRC results ===
Year	Entrant	Car	1	2	3	4	5	6	7	8	9	10	11	12	13	14	Pos.	Points
2018	ADAC Opel Rallye Junior Team	Opel Adam R2	MON	SWE	MEX	FRA	ARG	POR	ITA	FIN	GER; Ret	TUR	GBR	ESP	AUS		NC	0
2019	Tom Kristensson	Ford Fiesta R2	MON	SWE; 30	MEX	FRA; 22	ARG	CHL	POR	ITA; 23	FIN; 17	GER	TUR	GBR; 23	ESP	AUS; C	NC	0
2020	Tom Kristensson Motorsport	Ford Fiesta R2	MON	SWE; 26	MEX	EST; Ret	TUR	ITA; 22	MNZ; 27								NC	0
2021	M-Sport Ford WRT	Ford Fiesta R5 Mk. II	MON	ARC	CRO; Ret	POR; 40	ITA	KEN	EST; 16	BEL; Ret	GRE	FIN; Ret	ESP	MNZ			NC	0

=== ERC results ===
Year	Entrant	Car	1	2	3	4	5	6	7	8	Pos.	Points
2022	Kowax 2BRally Racing	Hyundai i20 R5	PRT1	PRT2	ESP1	POL; 2	LAT; 12	ITA	CZE; 25	ESP2	16th	31
2023	Bilteknik TRT Citroën Rally Team	Citroën C3 Rally2	PRT; 9	CAN; 12	POL; Ret	LAT	SWE	ITA	CZE	HUN	31st	13

=== Swedish Championship results ===
Year	Entrant	Car	1	2	3	4	5	6	Pos.	Points
*2024	Keane Motorsport	Skoda Fabia RS Rally2	HAL; 3	VIN; 4	NYK; 2	UPP	ESR	VAS	3rd	53

*season still in progress
