= 2020 Rally Sweden =

68th edition of Rally Sweden

2020 Rally Sweden: 68. Rally Sweden
Round 2 of 7 in the 2020 World Rally Championship
← Previous event	Next event →
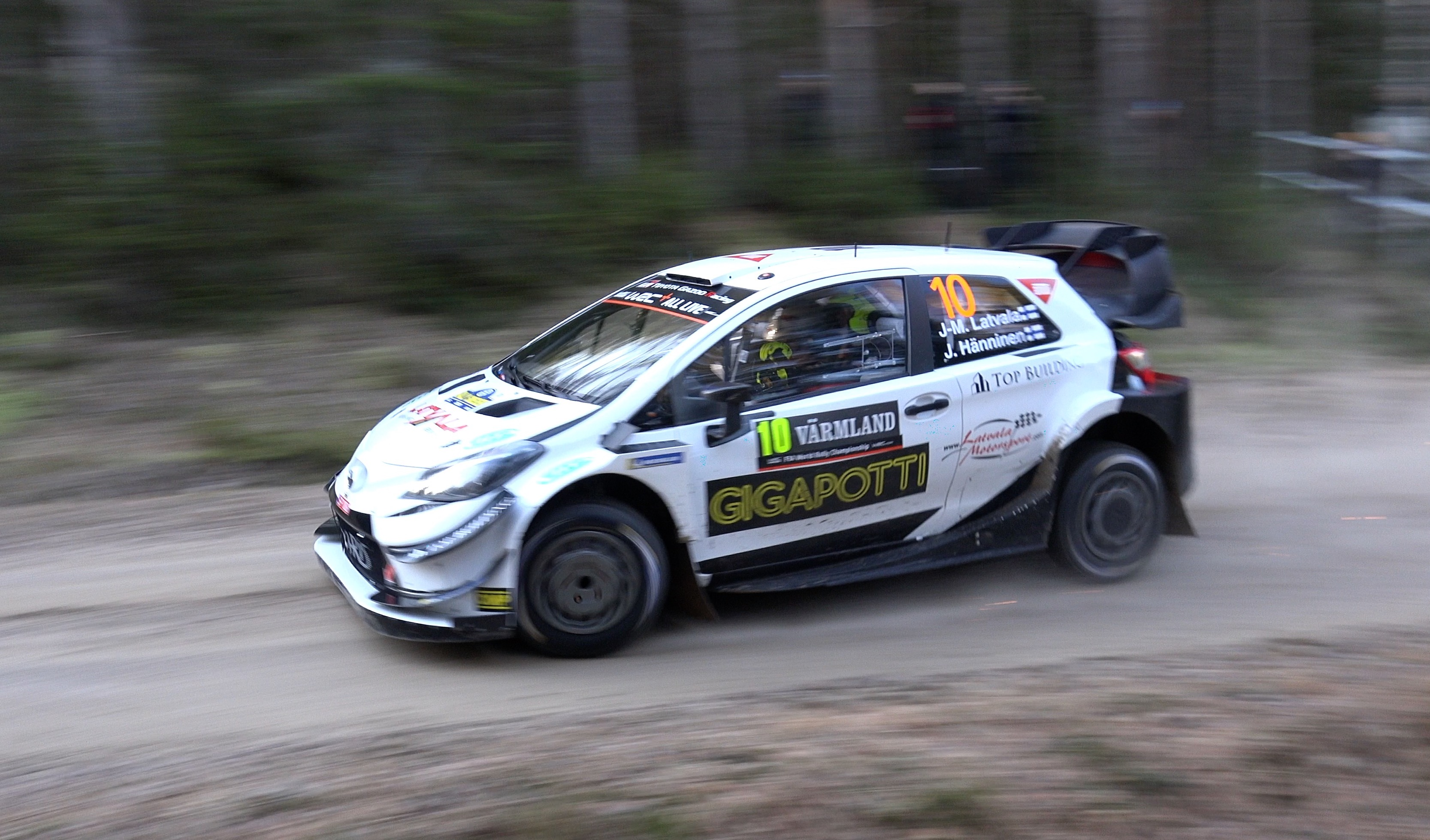
- A lack of snow forced the rally to be shortened.
- Host country: Sweden
- Rally base: Torsby, Värmland
- Dates run: 13 – 16 February 2020
- Start location: Karlstad trotting track, Karlstad
- Finish location: Torsby, Värmland
- Stages: 10 (169.74 km; 105.47 miles) (Note: The route of Rally Sweden was shortened from 301.26 km over 19 stages to 11 stages totalling 171.64 km. The route was shortened due to a lack of snow.)
- Stage surface: Snow
- Transport distance: 643.83 km (400.06 miles)
- Overall distance: 815.47 km (506.71 miles)

Statistics
- Crews registered: 55
- Crews: 46 at start, 42 at finish

Overall results
- Overall winner: (United Kingdom) Elfyn Evans (United Kingdom) Scott Martin (Japan) Toyota Gazoo Racing WRT; 1:11:43.1
- Power Stage winner: (Finland) Kalle Rovanperä (Finland) Jonne Halttunen (Japan) Toyota Gazoo Racing WRT; 10:55.1

Support category results
- WRC-2 winner: (Norway) Mads Østberg (Norway) Torstein Eriksen (France) PH-Sport; 1:15:53.1
- WRC-3 winner: (Finland) Jari Huttunen (Finland) Mikko Lukka; 1:15:46.1
- J-WRC winner: (Sweden) Tom Kristensson (Sweden) Joakim Sjöberg (Sweden) Tom Kristensson Motorsport; 1:22:51.3

The 2020 Rally Sweden (also known as the Rally Sweden 2020) (Swedish: Svenska Rallyt 2020) was a motor racing event for rally cars that was held over four days between 13 and 16 February 2020. It marked the sixty-eighth running of Rally Sweden and was the second round of the 2020 World Rally Championship, World Rally Championship-2 and World Rally Championship-3. It was also the first round of the Junior World Rally Championship. The 2020 event was based in the town of Torsby in Värmland County and consists of eleven special stages. The rally was scheduled to cover a total competitive distance of 301.26 km (187.19 mi), but was shortened to 171.64 km (106.65 mi) due to a lack of snow.

Ott Tänak and Martin Järveoja were the defending rally winners. Toyota Gazoo Racing WRT, the team they drove for in 2019, were the defending manufacturers' winners. Mads Østberg and Torstein Eriksen were the defending winners in the World Rally Championship-2 category. (Note: The championship was known as the World Rally Championship-2 Pro in 2019.) Ole Christian Veiby and Jonas Andersson were the reigning World Rally Championship-3 winners, but are not defending their WRC-3 title as they joined the WRC-2 category in 2020. (Note: The championship was known as the World Rally Championship-2 in 2019.) Tom Kristensson and Henrik Appelskog were the defending winners in the Junior World Rally Championship.

Elfyn Evans and Scott Martin were the overall winners of the rally, winning the Rally Sweden for the first time. Their team, Toyota Gazoo Racing WRT, were the manufacturers' winners. Mads Østberg and Torstein Eriksen successfully defended their titles in the WRC-2 category. Jari Huttunen and Mikko Lukka were the winners in the WRC-3 category, while Tom Kristensson and Henrik Appelskog won the junior class.

== Background ==
=== Championship standings prior to the event ===
Thierry Neuville and Nicolas Gilsoul entered the round with an eight-point lead over the six-time world champions Sébastien Ogier and Julien Ingrassia. Elfyn Evans and Scott Martin were third, a further five points behind. In the World Rally Championship for Manufacturers, defending manufacturers' champions Hyundai Shell Mobis WRT held a two-point lead over Toyota Gazoo Racing WRT, followed by M-Sport Ford WRT.

In the World Rally Championship-2 standings, Mads Østberg and Torstein Eriksen held a seven-point lead ahead of Adrien Fourmaux and Renaud Jamoul in the drivers' and co-drivers' standings respectively, with Nikolay Gryazin and Yaroslav Fedorov in third. In the manufacturer' championship, M-Sport Ford WRT led PH-Sport by five points.

In the World Rally Championship-3 standings, Eric Camilli and François-Xavier Buresi led the drivers' and co-drivers' standings by seven points respectively. Nicolas Ciamin and Yannick Roche were second, with Yoann Bonato and Benjamin Boulloud in third in both standings, a further three points behind.

=== Entry list ===
The following crews were entered into the rally. The event was open to crews competing in the World Rally Championship, its support categories, the World Rally Championship-2, World Rally Championship-3, and Junior World Rally Championship and privateer entries that were not registered to score points in any championship. Fifty-five entries were received, with eleven crews entered in World Rally Cars, six Group R5 cars entered in the World Rally Championship-2, sixteen in the World Rally Championship-3. A further sixteen crews were entered in the Junior World Rally Championship in Ford Fiesta R2s.

No.	Driver	Co-Driver	Entrant	Car	Tyre
World Rally Championship entries
3	(Finland) Teemu Suninen	(Finland) Jarmo Lehtinen	(United Kingdom) M-Sport Ford WRT	Ford Fiesta WRC	MI
4	(Finland) Esapekka Lappi	(Finland) Janne Ferm	(United Kingdom) M-Sport Ford WRT	Ford Fiesta WRC	MI
8	(Estonia) Ott Tänak	(Estonia) Martin Järveoja	(South Korea) Hyundai Shell Mobis WRT	Hyundai i20 Coupe WRC	MI
10	(Finland) Jari-Matti Latvala	(Finland) Juho Hänninen	(Finland) Latvala Motorsport	Toyota Yaris WRC	MI
11	(Belgium) Thierry Neuville	(Belgium) Nicolas Gilsoul	(South Korea) Hyundai Shell Mobis WRT	Hyundai i20 Coupe WRC	MI
16	(Republic of Ireland) Craig Breen	(Republic of Ireland) Paul Nagle	(South Korea) Hyundai Shell Mobis WRT	Hyundai i20 Coupe WRC	MI
17	(France) Sébastien Ogier	(France) Julien Ingrassia	(Japan) Toyota Gazoo Racing WRT	Toyota Yaris WRC	MI
18	(Japan) Takamoto Katsuta	(United Kingdom) Daniel Barritt	(Japan) Toyota Gazoo Racing WRT	Toyota Yaris WRC	MI
19	(Lithuania) Deividas Jocius	(Lithuania) Mindaugas Varža	(United Kingdom) M-Sport Ford WRT	Ford Fiesta WRC	—N/a
33	(United Kingdom) Elfyn Evans	(United Kingdom) Scott Martin	(Japan) Toyota Gazoo Racing WRT	Toyota Yaris WRC	MI
69	(Finland) Kalle Rovanperä	(Finland) Jonne Halttunen	(Japan) Toyota Gazoo Racing WRT	Toyota Yaris WRC	MI
World Rally Championship-2 entries
20	(Norway) Mads Østberg	(Norway) Torstein Eriksen	(France) PH-Sport (Note: Entry supported by Citroën World Rally Team.)	Citroën C3 R5	MI
21	(Russia) Nikolay Gryazin	(Russia) Yaroslav Fedorov	(South Korea) Hyundai Motorsport N (Note: Entry prepared by RedGrey Rally Team.)	Hyundai NG i20 R5	P
22	(Norway) Ole Christian Veiby	(Sweden) Jonas Andersson	(South Korea) Hyundai Motorsport N	Hyundai NG i20 R5	P
23	(France) Adrien Fourmaux	(Belgium) Renaud Jamoul	(United Kingdom) M-Sport Ford WRT	Ford Fiesta R5 Mk. II	MI
24	(United Kingdom) Rhys Yates	(United Kingdom) James Morgan	(United Kingdom) M-Sport Ford WRT	Ford Fiesta R5 Mk. II	MI
25	(Sweden) Pontus Tidemand	(Sweden) Patrick Barth	(Germany) Toksport WRT	Škoda Fabia R5 Evo	MI
World Rally Championship-3 entries
26	(Sweden) Johan Kristoffersson	(Norway) Stig Rune Skjærmoen	(Sweden) Kristoffersson Motorsport	Volkswagen Polo GTI R5	P
27	(Finland) Eerik Pietarinen	(Finland) Miikka Anttila	(Finland) Eerik Pietarinen (Note: Entry operated by TGS Worldwide.)	Škoda Fabia R5 Evo	P
28	(Finland) Emil Lindholm	(Finland) Mikael Korhonen	(Finland) Emil Lindholm	Škoda Fabia R5 Evo	MI
29	(Sweden) Oliver Solberg	(Republic of Ireland) Aaron Johnston	(Sweden) Oliver Solberg (Note: Entry supported by Škoda Motorsport.)	Škoda Fabia R5 Evo	P
30	(Estonia) Raul Jeets	(Estonia) Andrus Toom	(Estonia) Raul Jeets	Škoda Fabia R5 Evo	MI
31	(Estonia) Roland Poom	(Estonia) Ken Järveoja	(Estonia) Roland Poom	Ford Fiesta R5	P
32	(Italy) Andrea Nucita	(Italy) Bernardo Di Caro	(Italy) Andrea Nucita	Hyundai NG i20 R5	—N/a
34	(Czech Republic) Filip Mareš	(Czech Republic) Jan Hloušek	(Czech Republic) Filip Mareš (Note: Entry operated by ACCR Czech Rally Team.)	Škoda Fabia R5 Evo	MI
35	(Poland) Michał Sołowow	(Poland) Maciej Baran	(Poland) Barlinek Synthos RT	Škoda Fabia R5	MI
36	(Sweden) Joakim Roman	(Sweden) Alexander Glavsjö Holm	(Sweden) Joakim Roman	Škoda Fabia R5	P
37	(Brazil) Paulo Nobre	(Brazil) Gabriel Morales	(Brazil) Paulo Nobre (Note: Entry operated by Palmeirinha Rally.)	Škoda Fabia R5	—N/a
38	(Spain) Miguel Díaz-Aboitiz	(Spain) Diego Sanjuan De Eusebio	(Spain) Miguel Díaz-Aboitiz	Škoda Fabia R5	—N/a
39	(Italy) Giacomo Costenaro	(Italy) Justin Bardini	(Italy) Giacomo Costenaro	Škoda Fabia R5	—N/a
40	(Italy) Alberto Battistolli	(Italy) Fabrizia Pons	(Italy) Alberto Battistolli	Škoda Fabia R5	—N/a
41	(Luxembourg) Grégoire Munster	(Belgium) Louis Louka	(Luxembourg) Grégoire Munster	Hyundai NG i20 R5	—N/a
58	(Finland) Jari Huttunen	(Finland) Mikko Lukka	(Finland) Jari Huttunen	Hyundai NG i20 R5	MI
Junior World Rally Championship entries
42	(Sweden) Tom Kristensson	(Sweden) Joakim Sjöberg	(Sweden) Tom Kristensson Motorsport	Ford Fiesta R2	P
43	(Latvia) Mārtiņš Sesks	(Latvia) Renars Francis	(Latvia) LMT Autosporta Akadēmija	Ford Fiesta R2	P
44	(Estonia) Ken Torn	(Estonia) Kauri Pannas	(Estonia) Estonian Autosport Junior Team	Ford Fiesta R2	P
45	(Italy) Fabio Andolfi	(Italy) Stefano Savoia	(Italy) Fabio Andolfi	Ford Fiesta R2	P
46	(Finland) Sami Pajari	(Finland) Marko Salminen	(Finland) Team Flying Finn	Ford Fiesta R2	P
47	(Romania) Raul Baidu	(Romania) Gabriel Lazar	(Romania) Raul Baidu	Ford Fiesta R2	P
48	(Sweden) Pontus Lönnström	(Sweden) Stefan Gustavsson	(Sweden) Pontus Lönnström	Ford Fiesta R2	P
49	(United Kingdom) Jon Armstrong	(Republic of Ireland) Noel O'Sullivan	(United Kingdom) Jon Armstrong	Ford Fiesta R2	P
50	(Finland) Lauri Joona	(Finland) Ari Koponen	(Finland) Lauri Joona	Ford Fiesta R2	P
51	(Paraguay) Fabrizio Zaldívar	(Argentina) Fernando Mussano	(Paraguay) Fabrizio Zaldívar	Ford Fiesta R2	P
52	(Norway) Oscar Solberg	(Sweden) Jim Hjerpe	(Norway) PS 110% AB	Ford Fiesta R2	P
53	(United Kingdom) Ruairi Bell	(United Kingdom) Darren Garrod	(United Kingdom) Ruairi Bell	Ford Fiesta R2	P
54	(Italy) Enrico Oldrati	(Italy) Elia De Guio	(Italy) Enrico Oldrati	Ford Fiesta R2	P
55	(Italy) Tommaso Ciuffi	(Italy) Nicolò Gonella	(Italy) Tommaso Ciuffi	Ford Fiesta R2	P
56	(Italy) Marco Pollara	(Italy) Maurizio Messina	(Italy) Marco Pollara	Ford Fiesta R2	P
57	(United Kingdom) Catie Munnings	(Sweden) Ida Lidebjer-Granberg	(United Kingdom) Catie Munnings	Ford Fiesta R2	P
Other major entries
61	(Sweden) Dennis Rådström	(Sweden) Johan Johansson	(Sweden) Dennis Rådström	Ford Fiesta R2	MI

=== Route ===
The brand-new 18.94 km (11.77 mi) Nyckelvattnet stage was introduced into the rally. The Finnskogen stage, which runs across the border in Norway, returned to the itinerary. The Svullrya, Röjden and Rämmen stages, which were featured in the 2019 rally, were not included in the 2020 route.

The route was heavily revised in the week before the rally. Eight stages were cancelled due to unseasonably light snowfall in the region; tyre supplier Pirelli provided teams with studded tyres designed for driving on snow and ice, but without the expected snowfalls, the winter studs would be unable to properly grip the road surface. The changes to the route saw the second leg of the rally cancelled and the first leg split in two and run over separate days.

==== Original itinerary ====
All dates and times are CET (UTC+1).

Date	Time	No.	Stage name	Distance
13 February	09:01	—	Skalla [Shakedown]	6.86 km
Leg 1 — 133.01 km
13 February	20:08	SS1	Karlstad SSS	1.90 km
14 February	08:00	SS2	Hof-Finnskog 1	21.26 km
14 February	09:01	SS3	Finnskogen 1	20.89 km
14 February	09:57	SS4	Nyckelvattnet 1	18.94 km
14 February	13:49	SS5	Hof-Finnskog 2	21.26 km
14 February	14:55	SS6	Finnskogen 2	20.89 km
14 February	15:51	SS7	Nyckelvattnet 2	18.94 km
14 February	17:04	SS8	Torsby 1	8.93 km
Leg 2 — 116.94 km
15 February	08:13	SS9	Torntorp 1	19.92 km
15 February	09:04	SS10	Hagfors 1	19.80 km
15 February	10:08	SS11	Vargåsen 1	16.40 km
15 February	13:02	SS12	Torntorp 2	19.92 km
15 February	13:53	SS13	Hagfors 2	19.80 km
15 February	15:08	SS14	Vargåsen 2	16.40 km
15 February	17:45	SS15	Karlstad SSS 2	1.90 km
15 February	19:30	SS16	Torsby Sprint	2.80 km
Leg 3 — 51.31 km
16 February	07:50	SS16	Likenäs 1	21.19 km
16 February	09:51	SS17	Likenäs 2	21.19 km
16 February	12:18	SS18	Torsby 2 [Power Stage]	8.93 km

==== Revised itinerary ====
All dates and times are CET (UTC+1).

Date	Time	No.	Stage name	Distance
13 February	09:01	—	Skalla [Shakedown 1]	7.21 km
Leg 1 — 65.58 km
13 February	20:08	—	Karlstad SSS [Shakedown 2] (Note: The stage was changed to Shakedown before the rally began.)	1.90 km
14 February	08:42	SS1	Hof-Finnskog 1	21.26 km
14 February	10:08	SS2	Finnskogen 1	20.68 km
14 February	11:08	SS3	Nyckelvattnet 1	18.94 km
14 February	15:00	SS4	Torsby Sprint 1	2.80 km
Leg 2 — 63.68 km
15 February	08:42	SS5	Hof-Finnskog 2	21.26 km
15 February	10:08	SS6	Finnskogen 2	20.68 km
15 February	11:08	SS7	Nyckelvattnet 2	18.94 km
15 February	15:00	SS8	Torsby Sprint 2	2.80 km
Leg 3 — 42.38 km
16 February	10:08	SS9	Likenäs 1	21.19 km
16 February	12:18	SS10	Likenäs 2 [Power Stage]	21.19 km

== Report ==
=== World Rally Cars ===
Elfyn Evans and Scott Martin broke clear in the lead to win the rally. Defending world champions Ott Tänak and Martin Järveoja inherited second after Kalle Rovanperä and Jonne Halttunen dropping vital seconds when he stalled his engine in the final test of Friday. Jari-Matti Latvala made his championship return with ex-driver Juho Hänninen, but they retired from the rally due to mechanical issue.

==== Classification ====
Position		No.	Driver	Co-driver	Entrant	Car	Time	Difference	Points	
Event	Class	No.	Driver	Co-driver	Entrant	Car	Time	Difference	Event	Stage
1	1	33	Elfyn Evans	Scott Martin	Toyota Gazoo Racing WRT	Toyota Yaris WRC	1:11:43.1	0.0	25	0
2	2	8	Ott Tänak	Martin Järveoja	Hyundai Shell Mobis WRT	Hyundai i20 Coupe WRC	1:11:55.8	+12.7	18	2
3	3	69	Kalle Rovanperä	Jonne Halttunen	Toyota Gazoo Racing WRT	Toyota Yaris WRC	1:12:03.3	+20.2	15	5
4	4	17	Sébastien Ogier	Julien Ingrassia	Toyota Gazoo Racing WRT	Toyota Yaris WRC	1:12:06.7	+23.6	12	3
5	5	4	Esapekka Lappi	Janne Ferm	M-Sport Ford WRT	Ford Fiesta WRC	1:12:15.5	+32.4	10	1
6	6	11	Thierry Neuville	Nicolas Gilsoul	Hyundai Shell Mobis WRT	Hyundai i20 Coupe WRC	1:12:16.9	+33.8	8	4
7	7	16	Craig Breen	Paul Nagle	Hyundai Shell Mobis WRT	Hyundai i20 Coupe WRC	1:12:44.0	+1:00.9	6	0
8	8	3	Teemu Suninen	Jarmo Lehtinen	M-Sport Ford WRT	Ford Fiesta WRC	1:13:07.6	+1:24.5	4	0
9	9	18	Takamoto Katsuta	Daniel Barritt	Toyota Gazoo Racing WRT	Toyota Yaris WRC	1:13:42.7	+1:59.6	2	0
Retired SS5		10	Jari-Matti Latvala	Juho Hänninen	Latvala Motorsport	Toyota Yaris WRC	Mechanical		0	0
Did not start		19	Deividas Jocius	Mindaugas Varža	M-Sport Ford WRT	Ford Fiesta WRC	Withdrawn		0	0

==== Special stages ====
Date	No.	Stage name	Distance	Winners	Car	Time	Class leaders
13 February	—	Skalla [Shakedown 1]	7.21 km	Rovanperä / Halttunen	Toyota Yaris WRC	3:57.7	—N/a
13 February	—	Karlstad SSS [Shakedown 2]	1.90 km	Latvala / Hänninen	Toyota Yaris WRC	1:26.1	—N/a
14 February	SS1	Hof-Finnskog 1	21.26 km	Evans / Martin	Toyota Yaris WRC	9:43.9	Evans / Martin
14 February	SS2	Finnskogen 1	20.68 km	Tänak / Järveoja	Hyundai i20 Coupe WRC	10:13.4	Evans / Martin
14 February	SS3	Nyckelvattnet 1	18.94 km	Evans / Martin	Toyota Yaris WRC	9:02.9	Evans / Martin
14 February	SS4	Torsby Sprint 1	2.80 km	Tänak / Järveoja	Hyundai i20 Coupe WRC	1:42.4	Evans / Martin
15 February	SS5	Hof-Finnskog 2	21.26 km	Evans / Martin	Toyota Yaris WRC	9:25.2	Evans / Martin
15 February	SS6	Finnskogen 2	20.68 km	Evans / Martin	Toyota Yaris WRC	9:53.7	Evans / Martin
15 February	SS7	Nyckelvattnet 2	18.94 km	Evans / Martin	Toyota Yaris WRC	8:53.1	Evans / Martin
15 February	SS8	Torsby Sprint 2	2.80 km	Neuville / Gilsoul	Hyundai i20 Coupe WRC	1:42.4	Evans / Martin
16 February	SS9	Likenäs 1	21.19 km	Stage cancelled			
16 February	SS10	Likenäs 2 [Power Stage]	21.19 km	Rovanperä / Halttunen	Toyota Yaris WRC	10:55.1	Evans / Martin

==== Championship standings ====
Pos.	Drivers' championships			Co-drivers' championships			Manufacturers' championships		
Pos.	Move	Driver	Points	Move	Co-driver	Points	Move	Manufacturer	Points
1	2	Elfyn Evans	42	2	Scott Martin	42	1	Toyota Gazoo Racing WRT	73
2	1	Thierry Neuville	42	1	Nicolas Gilsoul	42	1	Hyundai Shell Mobis WRT	63
3	1	Sébastien Ogier	37	1	Julien Ingrassia	37		M-Sport Ford WRT	40
4	1	Kalle Rovanperä	30	1	Jonne Halttunen	30			
5	1	Esapekka Lappi	24	1	Janne Ferm	24			

=== World Rally Championship-2 ===
Ole Christian Veiby and Jonas Andersson took an early lead, but Mads Østberg and Torstein Eriksen gained the top spot after they overcame brake issues to win the class.

==== Classification ====
Position		No.	Driver	Co-driver	Entrant	Car	Time	Difference	Points	
Event	Class	No.	Driver	Co-driver	Entrant	Car	Time	Difference	Class	Event
12	1	20	Mads Østberg	Torstein Eriksen	PH-Sport	Citroën C3 R5	1:15:53.1	+23.4	25	0
13	2	22	Ole Christian Veiby	Jonas Andersson	Hyundai Motorsport N	Hyundai i20 R5	1:16:16.5	+23.4	18	0
15	3	25	Pontus Tidemand	Patrick Barth	Toksport WRT	Škoda Fabia R5 Evo	1:16:30.8	+37.7	15	0
18	4	23	Adrien Fourmaux	Renaud Jamoul	M-Sport Ford WRT	Ford Fiesta R5 Mk. II	1:18:59.6	+3:06.5	12	0
19	5	24	Rhys Yates	James Morgan	M-Sport Ford WRT	Ford Fiesta R5 Mk. II	1:19:07.3	+3:14.2	10	0
21	6	21	Nikolay Gryazin	Yaroslav Fedorov	Hyundai Motorsport N	Hyundai i20 R5	1:20:03.7	+4:10.6	8	0

==== Special stages ====
Date	No.	Stage name	Distance	Winners	Car	Time	Class leaders
13 February	—	Skalla [Shakedown 1]	7.21 km	Østberg / Eriksen	Citroën C3 R5	4:16.1	—N/a
13 February	—	Karlstad SSS [Shakedown 2]	1.90 km	Tidemand / Barth	Škoda Fabia R5 Evo	1:31.0	—N/a
14 February	SS1	Hof-Finnskog 1	21.26 km	Veiby / Andersson	Hyundai i20 R5	10:14.5	Veiby / Andersson
14 February	SS2	Finnskogen 1	20.68 km	Østberg / Eriksen	Citroën C3 R5	10:48.2	Østberg / Eriksen
14 February	SS3	Nyckelvattnet 1	18.94 km	Østberg / Eriksen	Citroën C3 R5	9:38.1	Østberg / Eriksen
14 February	SS4	Torsby Sprint 1	2.80 km	Østberg / Eriksen	Citroën C3 R5	1:46.6	Østberg / Eriksen
15 February	SS5	Hof-Finnskog 2	21.26 km	Veiby / Andersson	Hyundai i20 R5	10:03.2	Østberg / Eriksen
15 February	SS6	Finnskogen 2	20.68 km	Østberg / Eriksen	Citroën C3 R5	10:30.8	Østberg / Eriksen
15 February	SS7	Nyckelvattnet 2	18.94 km	Østberg / Eriksen	Citroën C3 R5	9:25.5	Østberg / Eriksen
15 February	SS8	Torsby Sprint 2	2.80 km	Østberg / Eriksen	Citroën C3 R5	1:46.8	Østberg / Eriksen
16 February	SS9	Likenäs 1	21.19 km	Stage cancelled			
16 February	SS10	Likenäs 2	21.19 km	Østberg / Eriksen	Citroën C3 R5	11:29.2	Østberg / Eriksen

==== Championship standings ====
Pos.	Drivers' championships			Co-drivers' championships			Manufacturers' championships		
Pos.	Move	Driver	Points	Move	Co-driver	Points	Move	Manufacturer	Points
1		Mads Østberg	50		Torstein Eriksen	50		M-Sport Ford WRT	52
2		Adrien Fourmaux	30		Renaud Jamoul	30		PH-Sport	50
3		Nikolay Gryazin	23		Yaroslav Fedorov	23		Hyundai Motorsport N	41
4		Rhys Yates	22		James Morgan	22		Toksport WRT	15
5		Ole Christian Veiby	18		Jonas Andersson	18			

=== World Rally Championship-3 ===
Emil Lindholm and Mikael Korhonen led WRC-3 after a trouble-free run, but they lost their lead to the eventual category winners Jari Huttunen and Mikko Lukka. Roland Poom and Ken Järveoja retired from the rally with a big accident.

==== Classification ====
Position		No.	Driver	Co-driver	Entrant	Car	Time	Difference	Points	
Event	Class	No.	Driver	Co-driver	Entrant	Car	Time	Difference	Class	Event
10	1	58	Jari Huttunen	Mikko Lukka	Jari Huttunen	Hyundai i20 R5	1:15:46.1	0.0	25	1
11	2	28	Emil Lindholm	Mikael Korhonen	Emil Lindholm	Škoda Fabia R5 Evo	1:15:51.1	+5.0	18	0
14	3	26	Johan Kristoffersson	Stig Rune Skjærmoen	Kristoffersson Motorsport	Volkswagen Polo GTI R5	1:16:17.4	+31.3	15	0
16	4	27	Eerik Pietarinen	Miikka Anttila	Eerik Pietarinen	Škoda Fabia R5 Evo	1:16:58.3	+1:12.2	12	0
17	5	29	Oliver Solberg	Aaron Johnston	Oliver Solberg	Škoda Fabia R5 Evo	1:18:09.3	+2:23.2	10	0
20	6	34	Filip Mareš	Jan Hloušek	Filip Mareš	Škoda Fabia R5 Evo	1:18:09.3	+3:41.9	8	0
22	7	30	Raul Jeets	Andrus Toom	Raul Jeets	Škoda Fabia R5 Evo	1:19:28.0	+4:37.2	6	0
24	8	35	Michał Sołowow	Maciej Baran	Barlinek Synthos RT	Škoda Fabia R5	1:22:06.0	+6:19.9	4	0
35	9	36	Joakim Roman	Alexander Glavsjö Holm	Joakim Roman	Škoda Fabia R5	1:27:06.1	+11:20.0	2	0
Retired SS3		31	Roland Poom	Ken Järveoja	Roland Poom	Ford Fiesta R5	Accident		0	0
Did not start		32	Andrea Nucita	Bernardo Di Caro	Andrea Nucita	Hyundai i20 R5	Withdrawn		0	0
Did not start		37	Paulo Nobre	Gabriel Morales	Paulo Nobre	Škoda Fabia R5	Withdrawn		0	0
Did not start		38	Miguel Díaz-Aboitiz	Diego Sanjuan De Eusebio	Miguel Díaz-Aboitiz	Škoda Fabia R5	Withdrawn		0	0
Did not start		39	Giacomo Costenaro	Justin Bardini	Giacomo Costenaro	Škoda Fabia R5	Withdrawn		0	0
Did not start		40	Alberto Battistolli	Fabrizia Pons	Alberto Battistolli	Škoda Fabia R5	Withdrawn		0	0
Did not start		41	Grégoire Munster	Louis Louka	Grégoire Munster	Hyundai i20 R5	Withdrawn		0	0

==== Special stages ====
Date	No.	Stage name	Distance	Winners	Car	Time	Class leaders
13 February	—	Skalla [Shakedown 1]	7.21 km	Huttunen / Lukka	Hyundai i20 R5	4:15.2	—N/a
13 February	—	Karlstad SSS [Shakedown 2]	1.90 km	Kristoffersson / Skjærmoen	Volkswagen Polo GTI R5	1:30.4	—N/a
14 February	SS1	Hof-Finnskog 1	21.26 km	Lindholm / Korhonen	Škoda Fabia R5 Evo	10:21.3	Lindholm / Korhonen
14 February	SS2	Finnskogen 1	20.68 km	Lindholm / Korhonen	Škoda Fabia R5 Evo	10:47.1	Lindholm / Korhonen
14 February	SS3	Nyckelvattnet 1	18.94 km	Lindholm / Korhonen	Škoda Fabia R5 Evo	9:33.6	Lindholm / Korhonen
14 February	SS4	Torsby Sprint 1	2.80 km	Huttunen / Lukka	Hyundai i20 R5	1:46.2	Lindholm / Korhonen
15 February	SS5	Hof-Finnskog 2	21.26 km	Solberg / Johnston	Škoda Fabia R5 Evo	10:04.1	Lindholm / Korhonen
15 February	SS6	Finnskogen 2	20.68 km	Huttunen / Lukka	Hyundai i20 R5	10:26.9	Lindholm / Korhonen
15 February	SS7	Nyckelvattnet 2	18.94 km	Huttunen / Lukka	Hyundai i20 R5	9:21.5	Huttunen / Lukka
15 February	SS8	Torsby Sprint 2	2.80 km	Huttunen / Lukka	Hyundai i20 R5	1:46.4	Huttunen / Lukka
16 February	SS9	Likenäs 1	21.19 km	Stage cancelled			
16 February	SS10	Likenäs 2	21.19 km	Kristoffersson / Skjærmoen	Volkswagen Polo GTI R5	11:26.8	Huttunen / Lukka

==== Championship standings ====
Pos.	Drivers' championships			Co-drivers' championships		
Pos.	Move	Driver	Points	Move	Co-driver	Points
1		Eric Camilli	25		François-Xavier Buresi	25
2		Jari Huttunen	25		Mikko Lukka	25
3	1	Nicolas Ciamin	18	1	Yannick Roche	18
4		Emil Lindholm	18		Mikael Korhonen	18
5	2	Yoann Bonato	15	2	Benjamin Boulloud	15

=== Junior World Rally Championship ===
Tom Kristensson and Joakim Sjöberg held a healthy lead throughout the rally to seal the win. Jon Armstrong and Noel O'Sullivan suffered a horrible high-speed crash, but they both walked away unharmed.

==== Classification ====
Position		No.	Driver	Co-driver	Entrant	Car	Time	Difference	Points	
Event	Class	No.	Driver	Co-driver	Entrant	Car	Time	Difference	Class	Stage
26	1	42	Tom Kristensson	Joakim Sjöberg	Tom Kristensson Motorsport	Ford Fiesta R2	1:22:51.3	0.0	25	3
28	2	43	Mārtiņš Sesks	Renars Francis	LMT Autosporta Akadēmija	Ford Fiesta R2	1:23:29.1	+37.8	18	1
29	3	44	Ken Torn	Kauri Pannas	Estonian Autosport Junior Team	Ford Fiesta R2	1:23:51.7	+1:00.4	15	0
30	4	46	Sami Pajari	Marko Salminen	Team Flying Finn	Ford Fiesta R2	1:24:02.9	+1:11.6	12	1
31	5	47	Raul Baidu	Gabriel Lazar	Raul Baidu	Ford Fiesta R2	1:26:15.1	+3:23.8	10	2
32	6	51	Fabrizio Zaldívar	Fernando Mussano	Fabrizio Zaldívar	Ford Fiesta R2	1:26:45.3	+3:54.0	8	0
33	7	53	Ruairi Bell	Darren Garrod	Ruairi Bell	Ford Fiesta R2	1:26:52.3	+4:01.0	6	0
34	8	48	Pontus Lönnström	Stefan Gustavsson	Pontus Lönnström	Ford Fiesta R2	1:27:05.4	+4:14.1	4	0
36	9	50	Lauri Joona	Ari Koponen	Lauri Joona	Ford Fiesta R2	1:27:06.8	+4:15.5	2	0
37	10	56	Marco Pollara	Maurizio Messina	Marco Pollara	Ford Fiesta R2	1:29:01.5	+6:10.2	1	0
38	11	54	Enrico Oldrati	Elia De Guio	Enrico Oldrati	Ford Fiesta R2	1:29:05.7	+6:14.4	0	0
40	12	55	Tommaso Ciuffi	Nicolò Gonella	Tommaso Ciuffi	Ford Fiesta R2	1:33:02.7	+10:11.4	0	0
41	13	52	Oscar Solberg	Jim Hjerpe	PS 110% AB	Ford Fiesta R2	1:33:56.4	+11:05.1	0	0
42	14	57	Catie Munnings	Ida Lidebjer-Granberg	Catie Munnings	Ford Fiesta R2	1:34:07.5	+11:16.2	0	0
Retired SS7		45	Fabio Andolfi	Stefano Savoia	Fabio Andolfi	Ford Fiesta R2	Radiator		0	0
Retired SS4		49	Jon Armstrong	Noel O'Sullivan	Jon Armstrong	Ford Fiesta R2	Accident		0	0

==== Special stages ====
Date	No.	Stage name	Distance	Winners	Car	Time	Class leaders
13 February	—	Skalla [Shakedown 1]	7.21 km	Sesks / Francis	Ford Fiesta R2	4:45.6	—N/a
13 February	—	Karlstad SSS [Shakedown 2]	1.90 km	Kristensson / Sjöberg	Ford Fiesta R2	1:41.0	—N/a
14 February	SS1	Hof-Finnskog 1	21.26 km	Kristensson / Sjöberg	Ford Fiesta R2	11:09.3	Kristensson / Sjöberg
14 February	SS2	Finnskogen 1	20.68 km	Kristensson / Sjöberg	Ford Fiesta R2	11:46.1	Kristensson / Sjöberg
14 February	SS3	Nyckelvattnet 1	18.94 km	Sesks / Francis	Ford Fiesta R2	10:31.2	Kristensson / Sjöberg
14 February	SS4	Torsby Sprint 1	2.80 km	Baidu / Lazar	Ford Fiesta R2	1:58.0	Kristensson / Sjöberg
15 February	SS5	Hof-Finnskog 2	21.26 km	Kristensson / Sjöberg	Ford Fiesta R2	10:45.6	Kristensson / Sjöberg
15 February	SS6	Finnskogen 2	20.68 km	Lönnström / Gustavsson	Ford Fiesta R2	11:29.5	Kristensson / Sjöberg
15 February	SS7	Nyckelvattnet 2	18.94 km	Pajari / Salminen	Ford Fiesta R2	10:11.0	Kristensson / Sjöberg
15 February	SS8	Torsby Sprint 2	2.80 km	Pajari / Salminen	Ford Fiesta R2	2:01.6	Kristensson / Sjöberg
16 February	SS9	Likenäs 1	21.19 km	Stage cancelled			
16 February	SS10	Likenäs 2	21.19 km	Lönnström / Gustavsson	Ford Fiesta R2	12:40.0	Kristensson / Sjöberg

==== Championship standings ====
Pos.	Drivers' championships			Co-drivers' championships			Nations' championships		
Pos.	Move	Driver	Points	Move	Co-driver	Points	Move	Country	Points
1		Tom Kristensson	28		Joakim Sjöberg	28		Sweden	25
2		Mārtiņš Sesks	19		Renars Francis	19		Latvia	18
3		Ken Torn	15		Kauri Pannas	15		Estonia	15
4		Sami Pajari	13		Marko Salminen	13		Finland	12
5		Raul Baidu	12		Gabriel Lazar	12		Romania	10

== Notes ==
Previous rally: 2020 Monte Carlo Rally	2020 FIA World Rally Championship	Next rally: 2020 Rally Mexico
Previous rally: 2019 Rally Sweden	2020 Rally Sweden	Next rally: 2022 Rally Sweden
