= 2020 Rally Monza =

41st edition of ACI Rally Monza

2020 ACI Rally Monza: 41. ACI Rally Monza 2020
Round 7 of 7 in the 2020 World Rally Championship
← Previous event
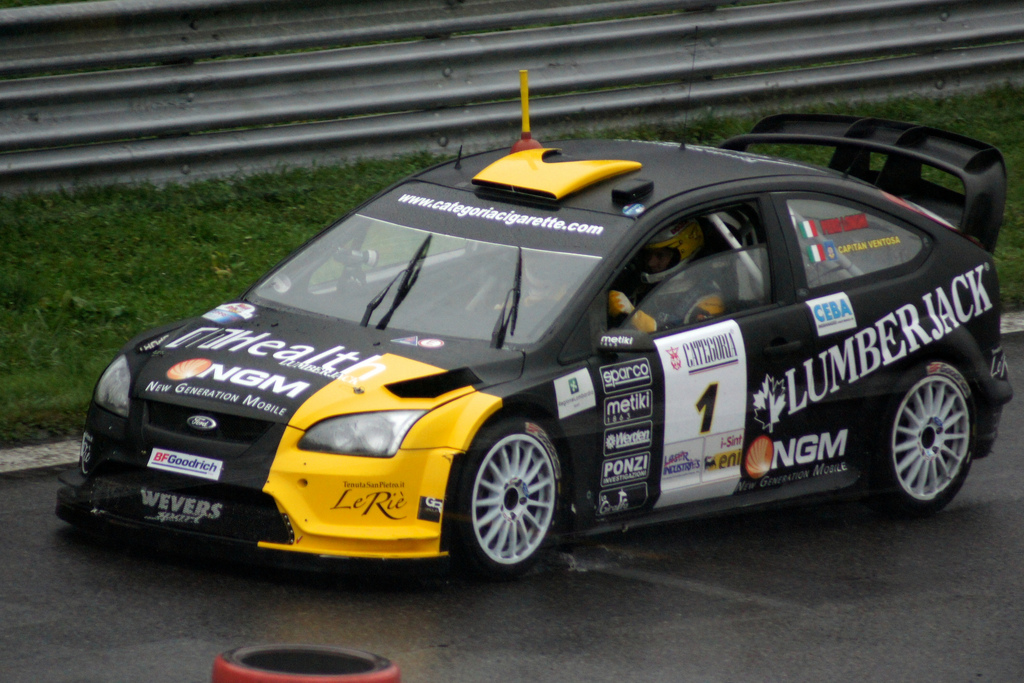
- Rally Monza marked the end of the 2020 season.
- Host country: Italy
- Rally base: Monza, Brianza
- Dates run: 3 – 6 December 2020
- Start location: Monza, Brianza
- Finish location: Monza, Brianza
- Stages: 16 (239.20 km; 148.63 miles)
- Stage surface: Tarmac
- Transport distance: 272.84 km (169.53 miles)
- Overall distance: 512.04 km (318.17 miles)

Statistics
- Crews registered: 95
- Crews: 91 at start, 71 at finish
- Cancellation: SS10 cancelled due to a road-blocked crash. SS12 cancelled due to heavy snow.

Overall results
- Overall winner: (France) Sébastien Ogier (France) Julien Ingrassia (Japan) Toyota Gazoo Racing WRT; 2:15:51.0
- Power Stage winner: (Japan) Takamoto Katsuta (United Kingdom) Daniel Barritt (Japan) Toyota Gazoo Racing WRT; 11:05.5

Support category results
- WRC-2 winner: (Norway) Mads Østberg (Norway) Torstein Eriksen (France) PH-Sport; 2:21:18.4
- WRC-3 winner: (Norway) Andreas Mikkelsen (Norway) Anders Jæger-Amland; 2:19:47.2
- J-WRC winner: (Sweden) Tom Kristensson (Sweden) Joakim Sjöberg (Sweden) Tom Kristensson Motorsport; 2:35:21.4

The 2020 Rally Monza (also known as ACI Rally Monza 2020) was a motor racing event for rally cars that was scheduled to hold between 3 and 6 December 2020. It marked the forty-first running of Monza Rally Show and was the final round of the 2020 World Rally Championship, World Rally Championship-2, World Rally Championship-3. It was also the final round of the Junior World Rally Championship. The event was based in the famous Autodromo Nazionale di Monza circuit near Milan, where the Italian Grand Prix is held. The rally covered a total competitive distance of 239.20 km (148.63 mi).

Sébastien Ogier and Julien Ingrassia won the rally. Their team, Toyota Gazoo Racing WRT, were the manufacturers' rally winners. Mads Østberg and Torstein Eriksen were the winners in the WRC-2 category. Andreas Mikkelsen and Anders Jæger-Amland winners in the WRC-3 category. Tom Kristensson and Henrik Appelskog won the junior class.

Ogier and Ingrassia won their seventh world titles, while Hyundai Shell Mobis WRT secured their second consecutive manufacturers' titles. Østberg and Eriksen won the WRC-2 championship, while Toksport WRT claimed the teams' titles. Jari Huttunen and Mikko Lukka became WRC-3 crowned champions. Kristensson and Appelskog sealed junior world titles.

== Background ==
=== Championship standings prior to the event ===
Elfyn Evans and Scott Martin entered the round with a fourteen-point lead over six-time world champions Sébastien Ogier and Julien Ingrassia. Thierry Neuville and Nicolas Gilsoul are third, a further ten points behind. In the World Rally Championship for Manufacturers, defending manufacturers' champions Hyundai Shell Mobis WRT held a seven-point lead over Toyota Gazoo Racing WRT, following by M-Sport Ford WRT.

In the World Rally Championship-2 standings, Pontus Tidemand and Patrick Barth held an eighteen-point lead ahead of Mads Østberg and Torstein Eriksen in the drivers' and co-drivers' standings respectively, with Adrien Fourmaux and Renaud Jamoul in third. In the manufacturer' championship, Toksport WRT led Hyundai Motorsport N by forty-five points. M-Sport Ford WRT sit in third, a further fourteen points behind.

In the World Rally Championship-3 standings, Marco Bulacia Wilkinson led Jari Huttunen by two points in the drivers' standing, with Kajetan Kajetanowicz in third. The co-drivers' standing was led by Mikko Lukka. Maciek Szczepaniak and Marcelo Der Ohannesian hold second and third respectively.

In the Junior championship, Mārtiņš Sesks and Renars Francis led Tom Kristensson and Joakim Sjöberg by eight points. Sami Pajari and Marko Salminen were third, four points further back. In the Nations' championships, Latvia held an eight-point lead over Sweden, with Finland in third.

=== Schedule changes and event inclusion ===
The event was included in the 2020 World Rally Championship as the final round of the season due to the COVID-19 pandemic.

=== Entry list ===
The following crews entered into the rally. The event was open to crews competing in the World Rally Championship, its support categories, the World Rally Championship-2, World Rally Championship-3, and Junior World Rally Championship and privateer entries that were not registered to score points in any championship. Ninety-five entries were received, with eleven crews entered World Rally Cars, four Group R5 cars entered in the World Rally Championship-2 and thirteen in the World Rally Championship-3. A further six crews entered in the Junior World Rally Championship in Ford Fiesta R2s.

No.	Driver	Co-Driver	Entrant	Car	Tyre
World Rally Championship entries
3	(Finland) Teemu Suninen	(Finland) Jarmo Lehtinen	(United Kingdom) M-Sport Ford WRT	Ford Fiesta WRC	M
4	(Finland) Esapekka Lappi	(Finland) Janne Ferm	(United Kingdom) M-Sport Ford WRT	Ford Fiesta WRC	M
6	(Spain) Dani Sordo	(Spain) Carlos del Barrio	(South Korea) Hyundai Shell Mobis WRT	Hyundai i20 Coupe WRC	M
8	(Estonia) Ott Tänak	(Estonia) Martin Järveoja	(South Korea) Hyundai Shell Mobis WRT	Hyundai i20 Coupe WRC	M
11	(Belgium) Thierry Neuville	(Belgium) Nicolas Gilsoul	(South Korea) Hyundai Shell Mobis WRT	Hyundai i20 Coupe WRC	M
17	(France) Sébastien Ogier	(France) Julien Ingrassia	(Japan) Toyota Gazoo Racing WRT	Toyota Yaris WRC	M
18	(Japan) Takamoto Katsuta	(United Kingdom) Daniel Barritt	(Japan) Toyota Gazoo Racing WRT	Toyota Yaris WRC	M
33	(United Kingdom) Elfyn Evans	(United Kingdom) Scott Martin	(Japan) Toyota Gazoo Racing WRT	Toyota Yaris WRC	M
44	(United Kingdom) Gus Greensmith	(United Kingdom) Elliott Edmondson	(United Kingdom) M-Sport Ford WRT	Ford Fiesta WRC	M
69	(Finland) Kalle Rovanperä	(Finland) Jonne Halttunen	(Japan) Toyota Gazoo Racing WRT	Toyota Yaris WRC	M
96	(Norway) Ole Christian Veiby	(Sweden) Jonas Andersson	(France) Hyundai 2C Competition	Hyundai i20 Coupe WRC	M
World Rally Championship-2 entries
20	(Sweden) Pontus Tidemand	(Sweden) Patrik Barth	(Germany) Toksport WRT	Škoda Fabia R5 Evo	P
21	(Norway) Mads Østberg	(Norway) Torstein Eriksen	(France) PH-Sport	Citroën C3 R5	M
22	(France) Adrien Fourmaux	(Belgium) Renaud Jamoul	(United Kingdom) M-Sport Ford WRT	Ford Fiesta R5 Mk. II	M
23	(Czech Republic) Jan Kopecký	(Czech Republic) Jan Hloušek	(Germany) Toksport WRT	Škoda Fabia R5 Evo	P
World Rally Championship-3 entries
24	(Bolivia) Marco Bulacia Wilkinson	(Argentina) Marcelo Der Ohannesian	(Bolivia) Marco Bulacia Wilkinson	Citroën C3 R5	P
25	(Finland) Jari Huttunen	(Finland) Mikko Lukka	(Finland) Jari Huttunen	Hyundai NG i20 R5	M
26	(Poland) Kajetan Kajetanowicz	(Poland) Maciej Szczepaniak	(Poland) Kajetan Kajetanowicz	Škoda Fabia R5 Evo	P
27	(Sweden) Oliver Solberg	(Republic of Ireland) Aaron Johnston	(Sweden) Oliver Solberg	Škoda Fabia R5 Evo	P
28	(Finland) Emil Lindholm	(Finland) Mikael Korhonen	(Finland) Emil Lindholm	Škoda Fabia R5 Evo	M
29	(Italy) Umberto Scandola	(Italy) Guido D'Amore	(Italy) Umberto Scandola	Hyundai NG i20 R5	M
30	(France) Yohan Rossel	(France) Benoît Fulcrand	(France) PH-Sport	Citroën C3 R5	M
31	(Luxembourg) Grégoire Munster	(Belgium) Louis Louka	(Luxembourg) Grégoire Munster	Hyundai NG i20 R5	P
32	(Italy) Enrico Brazzoli	(Italy) Maurizio Barone	(Italy) Enrico Brazzoli	Škoda Fabia R5 Evo	P
34	(Norway) Andreas Mikkelsen	(Norway) Anders Jæger-Amland	(Norway) Andreas Mikkelsen	Škoda Fabia R5 Evo	P
35	(Belgium) Cédric De Cecco	(Belgium) Jérôme Humblet	(Belgium) Cédric De Cecco	Škoda Fabia R5	P
36	(Republic of Ireland) Josh McErlean	(United Kingdom) Keaton Williams	(Republic of Ireland) Motorsport Ireland Rally Academy	Hyundai i20 R5	P
37	(Italy) Giacomo Ogliari	(Italy) Giacomo Ciucci	(Italy) Giacomo Ogliari	Citroën C3 R5	P
Junior World Rally Championship entries
38	(Latvia) Mārtiņš Sesks	(Latvia) Renars Francis	(Latvia) LMT Autosporta Akadēmija	Ford Fiesta R2	P
39	(Sweden) Tom Kristensson	(Sweden) Joakim Sjöberg	(Sweden) Tom Kristensson Motorsport	Ford Fiesta R2	P
40	(Finland) Sami Pajari	(Finland) Marko Salminen	(Finland) Team Flying Finn	Ford Fiesta R2	P
41	(Paraguay) Fabrizio Zaldívar	(Spain) Rogelio Peñate	(Paraguay) Fabrizio Zaldívar	Ford Fiesta R2	P
42	(United Kingdom) Ruairi Bell	(United Kingdom) Darren Garrod	(United Kingdom) Ruairi Bell	Ford Fiesta R2	P
43	(Italy) Fabio Andolfi	(Italy) Stefano Savoia	(Italy) Fabio Andolfi	Ford Fiesta R2	P
Other Major Entries
54	(Italy) Matteo Gamba	(Italy) Nicola Arena	(Italy) Matteo Gamba	Škoda Fabia R5 Evo	P
55	(Netherlands) Kevin Abbring	(Belgium) Pieter Tsjoen	(Netherlands) Kevin Abbring	Volkswagen Polo GTI R5	P
56	(France) Stéphane Lefebvre	(France) Thomas Dubois	(France) D-Max Suisse	Citroën C3 R5	P
57	(Monaco) Stéphane Richelmi	(France) Romain Haut-Labourdette	(Monaco) Stéphane Richelmi	Volkswagen Polo GTI R5	P
58	(Finland) Niclas Grönholm	(Finland) Antti Linnaketo	(Finland) Niclas Grönholm	Škoda Fabia R5 Evo	P
59	(Italy) Giacomo Scattolon	(Italy) Giovanni Bernacchini	(Italy) Giacomo Scattolon	Škoda Fabia R5 Evo	P
66	(Italy) Franco Morbidelli	(Italy) Simone Scattolin	(Italy) Franco Morbidelli	Hyundai NG i20 R5	M
72	(Greece) Nikos Pavlidis	(United Kingdom) Allan Harryman	(Greece) Step Racing	Škoda Fabia R5 Evo	P
77	(United Kingdom) Tom Williams	(Italy) Giorgia Ascalone	(United Kingdom) Tom Williams	Ford Fiesta R5	P
78	(Germany) Maro Engel	(Austria) Ilka Minor	(Germany) Toksport WRT	Škoda Fabia R5 Evo	P
79	(Belgium) Maxime Potty	(Belgium) Loïc Dumont	(Belgium) Maxime Potty	Škoda Fabia R5	M
91	(France) Pierre Ragues	(France) Julien Pesenti	(France) Pierre Ragues	Alpine A110 Rally	M
105	(Italy) Carlo Covi	(Italy) Michela Lorigiola	(Italy) Carlo Covi	Peugeot 208 R2	M

=== Route ===
The first and last day of action, including the Power Stage, followed Monza Rally Show to take place in stages inside the Autodromo Nazionale di Monza, while the second leg was focused on public stages north of Bergamo in the foothills of the Alps.

==== Itinerary ====
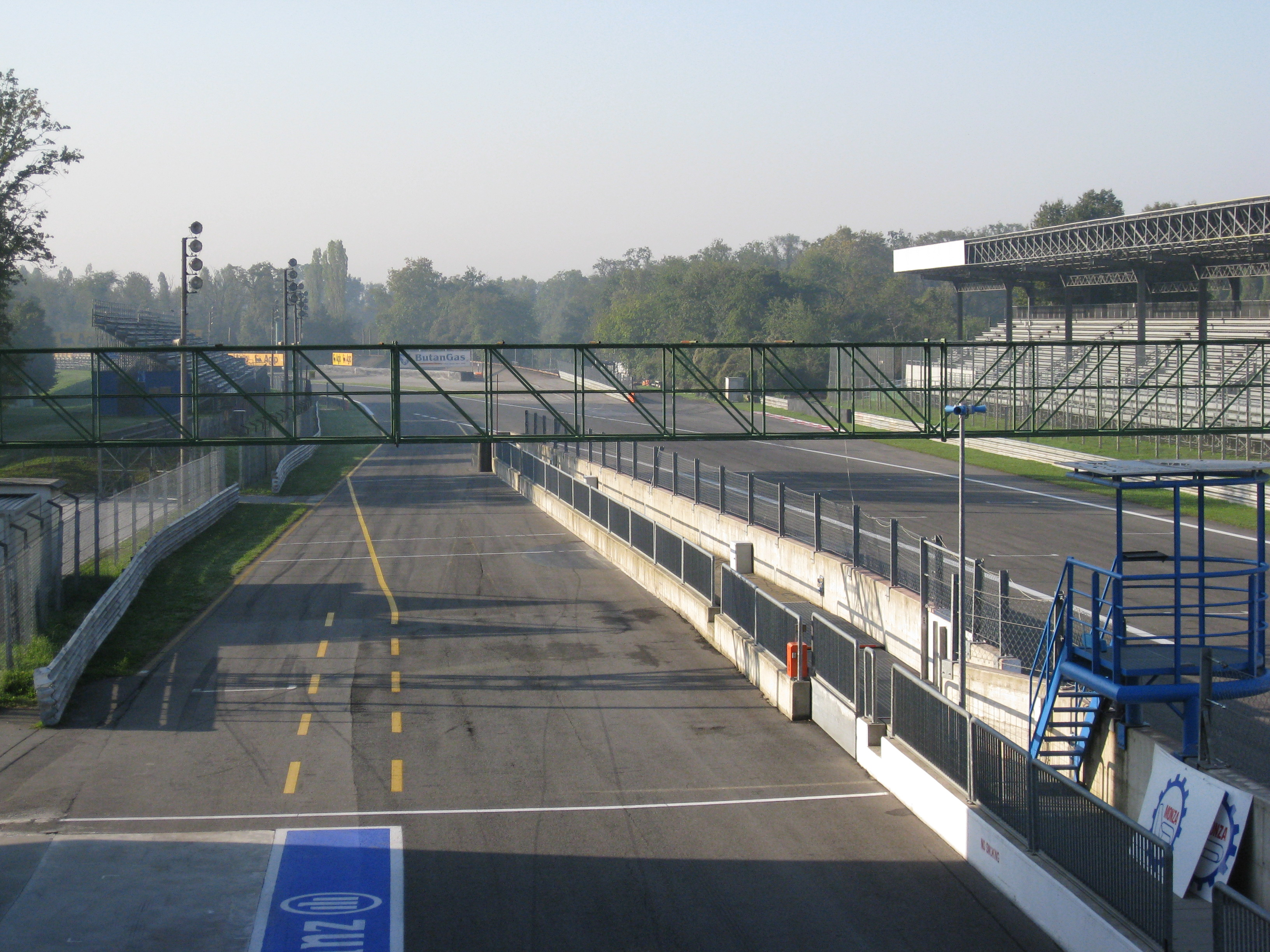
The rally featured the Autodromo Nazionale di Monza race track.

All dates and times were CEST (UTC+2).

Date	Time	No.	Stage name	Distance
3 December	10:01	—	Monza Circuit [Shakedown]	4.00 km
Leg 1 — 73.94 km
3 December	14:08	SS1	Sottozero The Monza Legacy	4.33 km
4 December	07:58	SS2	Scorpion 1	13.43 km
4 December	10:08	SS3	Scorpion 2	13.43 km
4 December	12:38	SS4	Cinturato 1	16.22 km
4 December	15:08	SS5	Cinturato 2	16.22 km
4 December	17:38	SS6	PZero Grand Prix 1	10.31 km
Leg 2 — 126.95 km
5 December	07:52	SS7	Selvino 1	25.06 km
5 December	09:08	SS8	Gerosa 1	11.09 km
5 December	10:02	SS9	Costa Valle Imagna 1	22.17 km
5 December	13:22	SS10	Selvino 2	25.06 km
5 December	14:38	SS11	Gerosa 2	11.09 km
5 December	15:32	SS12	Costa Valle Imagna 2	22.17 km
5 December	17:38	SS13	PZero Grand Prix 2	10.31 km
Leg 3 — 38.31 km
6 December	07:48	SS14	PZero Grand Prix 3	10.31 km
6 December	10:08	SS15	Serraglio 1	14.00 km
6 December	12:18	SS16	Serraglio 2 [Power Stage]	14.00 km

== Report ==
=== World Rally Cars ===
Dani Sordo and Carlos del Barrio held a narrow lead going onto Saturday, despite a ten-second time penalty for cutting a chicane. Teammate Thierry Neuville and Nicolas Gilsoul's title hope was washed away as their i20 was drawn out when the engine expired in heavy standing water after damaging their right-front suspension. Teemu Suninen and Jarmo Lehtinen retired from the rally because of an unfixable misfiring engine. Championship situation was shifted on Saturday as Elfyn Evans and Scott Martin went off-road in the afternoon loop. Other major retirements of the day included Gus Greensmith and Elliott Edmondson, and Ole Christian Veiby and Jonas Andersson. Eventually, Sébastien Ogier and Julien Ingrassia won the event, which was enough to overhaul their teammate Evans and Martin to snatch their seventh world titles.

==== Classification ====
Position		No.	Driver	Co-driver	Entrant	Car	Time	Difference	Points	
Event	Class	No.	Driver	Co-driver	Entrant	Car	Time	Difference	Event	Stage
1	1	17	Sébastien Ogier	Julien Ingrassia	Toyota Gazoo Racing WRT	Toyota Yaris WRC	2:15:51.0	0.0	25	0
2	2	8	Ott Tänak	Martin Järveoja	Hyundai Shell Mobis WRT	Hyundai i20 Coupe WRC	2:16:04.9	+13.9	18	4
3	3	6	Dani Sordo	Carlos del Barrio	Hyundai Shell Mobis WRT	Hyundai i20 Coupe WRC	2:16:06.3	+15.3	15	1
4	4	4	Esapekka Lappi	Janne Ferm	M-Sport Ford WRT	Ford Fiesta WRC	2:16:36.7	+45.7	12	2
5	5	69	Kalle Rovanperä	Jonne Halttunen	Toyota Gazoo Racing WRT	Toyota Yaris WRC	2:17:02.1	+1:11.1	10	0
20	6	18	Takamoto Katsuta	Daniel Barritt	Toyota Gazoo Racing WRT	Toyota Yaris WRC	2:27:41.3	+11:50.3	0	5
29	7	33	Elfyn Evans	Scott Martin	Toyota Gazoo Racing WRT	Toyota Yaris WRC	2:36:03.6	+20:12.6	0	3
Retired SS10		44	Gus Greensmith	Elliott Edmondson	M-Sport Ford WRT	Ford Fiesta WRC	Accident		0	0
Retired SS10		96	Ole Christian Veiby	Jonas Andersson	Hyundai 2C Competition	Hyundai i20 Coupe WRC	Accident		0	0
Retired SS5		3	Teemu Suninen	Jarmo Lehtinen	M-Sport Ford WRT	Ford Fiesta WRC	Engine		0	0
Retired SS4		11	Thierry Neuville	Nicolas Gilsoul	Hyundai Shell Mobis WRT	Hyundai i20 Coupe WRC	Suspension		0	0

==== Special stages ====
Date	No.	Stage name	Distance	Winners	Car	Time	Class leaders
3 December	—	Monza Circuit [Shakedown]	4.00 km	Neuville / Gilsoul	Hyundai i20 Coupe WRC	3:08.7	—N/a
3 December	SS1	Sottozero The Monza Legacy	4.33 km	Ogier / Ingrassia	Toyota Yaris WRC	3:31.5	Ogier / Ingrassia
4 December	SS2	Scorpion 1	13.43 km	Sordo / del Barrio	Hyundai i20 Coupe WRC	9:54.5	Sordo / del Barrio
4 December	SS3	Scorpion 2	13.43 km	Lappi / Ferm	Ford Fiesta WRC	9:56.8	Lappi / Ferm
4 December	SS4	Cinturato 1	16.22 km	Evans / Martin	Toyota Yaris WRC	11:56.5	Lappi / Ferm
4 December	SS5	Cinturato 2	16.22 km	Ogier / Ingrassia	Toyota Yaris WRC	11:53.5	Lappi / Ferm
4 December	SS6	PZero Grand Prix 1	10.31 km	Sordo / del Barrio	Hyundai i20 Coupe WRC	5:52.5	Sordo / del Barrio
5 December	SS7	Selvino 1	25.06 km	Ogier / Ingrassia	Toyota Yaris WRC	3:31.5	Ogier / Ingrassia
5 December	SS8	Gerosa 1	11.09 km	Sordo / del Barrio	Hyundai i20 Coupe WRC	7:05.0	Sordo / del Barrio
5 December	SS9	Costa Valle Imagna 1	22.17 km	Evans / Martin	Toyota Yaris WRC	14:35.5	Ogier / Ingrassia
5 December	SS10	Selvino 2	25.06 km	Stage cancelled			
5 December	SS11	Gerosa 2	11.09 km	Ogier / Ingrassia (Note: Umberto Scandola and Guido D'Amore were placed first overall on the stage.)	Toyota Yaris WRC	8:25.6	Ogier / Ingrassia
5 December	SS12	Costa Valle Imagna 2	22.17 km	Stage cancelled			
5 December	SS13	PZero Grand Prix 2	10.31 km	Sordo / del Barrio	Hyundai i20 Coupe WRC	5:47.8	Ogier / Ingrassia
6 December	SS14	PZero Grand Prix 3	10.31 km	Ogier / Ingrassia	Toyota Yaris WRC	5:32.2	Ogier / Ingrassia
6 December	SS15	Serraglio 1	14.00 km	Sordo / del Barrio	Hyundai i20 Coupe WRC	11:10.2	Ogier / Ingrassia
6 December	SS16	Serraglio 2 [Power Stage]	14.00 km	Katsuta / Barritt	Toyota Yaris WRC	11:05.5	Ogier / Ingrassia

==== Championship standings ====
- **Bold text** indicates 2020 World Champions.

Pos.	Drivers' championships			Co-drivers' championships			Manufacturers' championships		
Pos.	Move	Driver	Points	Move	Co-driver	Points	Move	Manufacturer	Points
1	1	**Sébastien Ogier**	122	1	**Julien Ingrassia**	122		**Hyundai Shell Mobis WRT**	241
2	1	Elfyn Evans	114	1	Scott Martin	114		Toyota Gazoo Racing WRT	236
3	1	Ott Tänak	105	1	Martin Järveoja	105		M-Sport Ford WRT	129
4	1	Thierry Neuville	87	1	Nicolas Gilsoul	87		Hyundai 2C Competition	8
5		Kalle Rovanperä	80		Jonne Halttunen	80			

=== World Rally Championship-2 ===
Adrien Fourmaux and Renaud Jamoul led the category, but a right-rear puncture lost their lead to Pontus Tidemand and Patrik Barth. Mads Østberg and Torstein Eriksen turned the tables to their favour on Saturday. The Norwegian crew eventually won the class to seal the WRC-2 titles.

==== Classification ====
Position		No.	Driver	Co-driver	Entrant	Car	Time	Difference	Points	
Event	Class	No.	Driver	Co-driver	Entrant	Car	Time	Difference	Class	Event
9	1	21	Mads Østberg	Torstein Eriksen	PH-Sport	Citroën C3 R5	2:21:18.4	0.0	**25**	**2**
10	2	20	Pontus Tidemand	Patrik Barth	Toksport WRT	Škoda Fabia R5 Evo	2:21:44.0	+25.6	**18**	**1**
13	3	23	Jan Kopecký	Jan Hloušek	Toksport WRT	Škoda Fabia R5 Evo	2:22:41.8	+1:23.4	**15**	**0**
49	4	22	Adrien Fourmaux	Renaud Jamoul	M-Sport Ford WRT	Ford Fiesta R5 Mk. II	2:50:38.8	+29:20.4	**12**	**0**

==== Special stages ====
Date	No.	Stage name	Distance	Winners	Car	Time	Class leaders
3 December	—	Monza Circuit [Shakedown]	4.00 km	Østberg / Eriksen	Citroën C3 R5	3:19.0	—N/a
3 December	SS1	Sottozero The Monza Legacy	4.33 km	Fourmaux / Jamoul	Ford Fiesta R5 Mk. II	3:39.9	Fourmaux / Jamoul
4 December	SS2	Scorpion 1	13.43 km	Fourmaux / Jamoul	Ford Fiesta R5 Mk. II	10:13.8	Fourmaux / Jamoul
4 December	SS3	Scorpion 2	13.43 km	Fourmaux / Jamoul	Ford Fiesta R5 Mk. II	10:10.3	Fourmaux / Jamoul
4 December	SS4	Cinturato 1	16.22 km	Tidemand / Barth	Škoda Fabia R5 Evo	12:29.9	Fourmaux / Jamoul
4 December	SS5	Cinturato 2	16.22 km	Tidemand / Barth	Škoda Fabia R5 Evo	12:26.6	Tidemand / Barth
4 December	SS6	PZero Grand Prix 1	10.31 km	Fourmaux / Jamoul	Ford Fiesta R5 Mk. II	6:03.4	Tidemand / Barth
5 December	SS7	Selvino 1	25.06 km	Østberg / Eriksen	Citroën C3 R5	18:32.3	Fourmaux / Jamoul
5 December	SS8	Gerosa 1	11.09 km	Fourmaux / Jamoul	Ford Fiesta R5 Mk. II	7:15.2	Fourmaux / Jamoul
5 December	SS9	Costa Valle Imagna 1	22.17 km	Østberg / Eriksen	Citroën C3 R5	14:55.8	Østberg / Eriksen
5 December	SS10	Selvino 2	25.06 km	Stage cancelled			
5 December	SS11	Gerosa 2	11.09 km	Tidemand / Barth	Škoda Fabia R5 Evo	9:09.1	Østberg / Eriksen
5 December	SS12	Costa Valle Imagna 2	22.17 km	Stage cancelled			
5 December	SS13	PZero Grand Prix 2	10.31 km	Fourmaux / Jamoul	Ford Fiesta R5 Mk. II	5:54.6	Østberg / Eriksen
6 December	SS14	PZero Grand Prix 3	10.31 km	Fourmaux / Jamoul	Ford Fiesta R5 Mk. II	5:43.5	Østberg / Eriksen
6 December	SS15	Serraglio 1	14.00 km	Tidemand / Barth	Škoda Fabia R5 Evo	11:24.0	Østberg / Eriksen
6 December	SS16	Serraglio 2	14.00 km	Østberg / Eriksen	Citroën C3 R5	11:27.2	Østberg / Eriksen

==== Championship standings ====
- **Bold text** indicates 2020 World Champions.

Pos.	Drivers' championships			Co-drivers' championships			Manufacturers' championships		
Pos.	Move	Driver	Points	Move	Co-driver	Points	Move	Manufacturer	Points
1	1	**Mads Østberg**	112	1	**Torstein Eriksen**	112		**Toksport WRT**	147
2	1	Pontus Tidemand	108	1	Patrick Barth	108	2	PH-Sport	112
3		Adrien Fourmaux	78		Renaud Jamoul	78	1	Hyundai Motorsport N	102
4		Ole Christian Veiby	51		Jonas Andersson	51	1	M-Sport Ford WRT	88
5		Nikolay Gryazin	51		Yaroslav Fedorov	41			

=== World Rally Championship-3 ===
Andreas Mikkelsen and Anders Jæger-Amland avoided any drama to lead the class. The Norwegian crew ran as high as third in the overall standings. However, their lead was narrowed by Oliver Solberg and Aaron Johnston by the end of the second leg. Mikkelsen and Jæger-Amland refused to give their lead away and eventually won the category. Jari Huttunen and Mikko Lukka became WRC-3 crowned champions.

==== Classification ====
Position		No.	Driver	Co-driver	Entrant	Car	Time	Difference	Points	
Event	Class	No.	Driver	Co-driver	Entrant	Car	Time	Difference	Class	Event
6	1	34	Andreas Mikkelsen	Anders Jæger-Amland	Andreas Mikkelsen	Škoda Fabia R5 Evo	2:19:47.2	0.0	25	8
7	2	27	Oliver Solberg	Aaron Johnston	Oliver Solberg	Škoda Fabia R5 Evo	2:20:03.1	+15.9	18	6
8	3	25	Jari Huttunen	Mikko Lukka	Jari Huttunen	Hyundai NG i20 R5	2:21:06.5	+1:19.2	15	4
11	4	28	Emil Lindholm	Mikael Korhonen	Emil Lindholm	Škoda Fabia R5 Evo	2:21:45.0	+1:57.8	12	0
14	5	26	Kajetan Kajetanowicz	Maciej Szczepaniak	Kajetan Kajetanowicz	Škoda Fabia R5 Evo	2:23:25.5	+3:38.3	10	0
16	6	24	Marco Bulacia Wilkinson	Marcelo Der Ohannesian	Marco Bulacia Wilkinson	Citroën C3 R5	2:24:38.8	+4:51.6	8	0
17	7	36	Josh McErlean	Keaton Williams	Motorsport Ireland Rally Academy	Hyundai i20 R5	2:24:55.3	+5:08.1	6	0
18	8	35	Cédric De Cecco	Jérôme Humblet	Cédric De Cecco	Škoda Fabia R5	2:26:53.7	+7:06.5	4	0
23	9	37	Giacomo Ogliari	Giacomo Ciucci	Giacomo Ogliari	Citroën C3 R5	2:30:08.8	+10:21.6	2	0
35	10	30	Yohan Rossel	Benoît Fulcrand	PH-Sport	Citroën C3 R5	2:40:52.1	+21:04.9	1	0
39	11	32	Enrico Brazzoli	Maurizio Barone	Enrico Brazzoli	Škoda Fabia R5 Evo	2:42:58.0	+23:10.8	0	0
Retired SS16		31	Grégoire Munster	Louis Louka	Grégoire Munster	Hyundai NG i20 R5	Rolled		0	0
Retired SS14		29	Umberto Scandola	Guido D'Amore	Umberto Scandola	Hyundai NG i20 R5	Mechanical		0	0

==== Special stages ====
Date	No.	Stage name	Distance	Winners	Car	Time	Class leaders
3 December	—	Monza Circuit [Shakedown]	4.00 km	Scandola / D'Amore	Hyundai NG i20 R5	3:18.4	—N/a
3 December	SS1	Sottozero The Monza Legacy	4.33 km	Huttunen / Lukka	Hyundai NG i20 R5	3:37.3	Huttunen / Lukka
4 December	SS2	Scorpion 1	13.43 km	Mikkelsen / Jæger-Amland	Škoda Fabia R5 Evo	10:08.5	Mikkelsen / Jæger-Amland
4 December	SS3	Scorpion 2	13.43 km	Mikkelsen / Jæger-Amland	Škoda Fabia R5 Evo	10:06.8	Mikkelsen / Jæger-Amland
4 December	SS4	Cinturato 1	16.22 km	Mikkelsen / Jæger-Amland	Škoda Fabia R5 Evo	12:12.3	Mikkelsen / Jæger-Amland
4 December	SS5	Cinturato 2	16.22 km	Mikkelsen / Jæger-Amland	Škoda Fabia R5 Evo	12:21.6	Mikkelsen / Jæger-Amland
4 December	SS6	PZero Grand Prix 1	10.31 km	Mikkelsen / Jæger-Amland	Škoda Fabia R5 Evo	6:06.3	Mikkelsen / Jæger-Amland
5 December	SS7	Selvino 1	25.06 km	Lindholm / Korhonen	Škoda Fabia R5 Evo	18:40.1	Mikkelsen / Jæger-Amland
5 December	SS8	Gerosa 1	11.09 km	Scandola / D'Amore	Hyundai NG i20 R5	7:18.7	Mikkelsen / Jæger-Amland
5 December	SS9	Costa Valle Imagna 1	22.17 km	Solberg / Johnston	Škoda Fabia R5 Evo	15:00.1	Mikkelsen / Jæger-Amland
5 December	SS10	Selvino 2	25.06 km	Stage cancelled			
5 December	SS11	Gerosa 2	11.09 km	Scandola / D'Amore	Hyundai NG i20 R5	8:13.4	Mikkelsen / Jæger-Amland
5 December	SS12	Costa Valle Imagna 2	22.17 km	Stage cancelled			
5 December	SS13	PZero Grand Prix 2	10.31 km	Huttunen / Lukka	Hyundai NG i20 R5	5:53.3	Mikkelsen / Jæger-Amland
6 December	SS14	PZero Grand Prix 3	10.31 km	Mikkelsen / Jæger-Amland	Škoda Fabia R5 Evo	5:44.3	Mikkelsen / Jæger-Amland
6 December	SS15	Serraglio 1	14.00 km	Mikkelsen / Jæger-Amland	Škoda Fabia R5 Evo	11:25.5	Mikkelsen / Jæger-Amland
6 December	SS16	Serraglio 2	14.00 km	Solberg / Johnston	Škoda Fabia R5 Evo	11:22.0	Mikkelsen / Jæger-Amland

==== Championship standings ====
- **Bold text** indicates 2020 World Champions.

Pos.	Drivers' championships			Co-drivers' championships		
Pos.	Move	Driver	Points	Move	Co-driver	Points
1		**Jari Huttunen**	83		**Mikko Lukka**	83
2		Marco Bulacia Wilkinson	78		Maciek Szczepaniak	65
3		Kajetan Kajetanowicz	65	1	Aaron Johnston	61
4		Oliver Solberg	61	1	Marcelo Der Ohannesian	53
5		Nicolas Ciamin	28		Marc Martí	37

=== Junior World Rally Championship ===
Tom Kristensson and Joakim Sjöberg comfortably led the class, while their title rivals Mārtiņš Sesks and Renars Francis, and Sami Pajari and Marko Salminen both in trouble. Championship leader Sesks and Francis' rally went even worse when they crashed out on Saturday. Kristensson and Sjöberg comfortably brought the car home to put the victory in their pockets, and with that, junior world titles in hands.

==== Classification ====
Position		No.	Driver	Co-driver	Entrant	Car	Time	Difference	Points	
Event	Class	No.	Driver	Co-driver	Entrant	Car	Time	Difference	Class	Stage
27	1	39	Tom Kristensson	Joakim Sjöberg	Tom Kristensson Motorsport	Ford Fiesta R2	2:35:21.4	0.0	37.5	7
33	2	41	Fabrizio Zaldívar	Rogelio Peñate	Fabrizio Zaldívar	Ford Fiesta R2	2:38:22.9	+3:01.5	27	0
34	3	42	Ruairi Bell	Darren Garrod	Ruairi Bell	Ford Fiesta R2	2:39:42.4	+4:21.0	22.5	2
71	4	40	Sami Pajari	Marko Salminen	Team Flying Finn	Ford Fiesta R2	3:13:26.3	+38:04.9	18	4
Retired SS7		38	Mārtiņš Sesks	Renars Francis	LMT Autosporta Akadēmija	Ford Fiesta R2	Accident		0	1
Retired SS6		43	Fabio Andolfi	Stefano Savoia	Fabio Andolfi	Ford Fiesta R2	Mechanical		0	0

==== Special stages ====
Date	No.	Stage name	Distance	Winners	Car	Time	Class leaders
3 December	—	Monza Circuit [Shakedown]	4.00 km	Pajari / Salminen	Ford Fiesta R2	3:37.6	—N/a
3 December	SS1	Sottozero The Monza Legacy	4.33 km	Pajari / Salminen	Ford Fiesta R2	4:01.3	Pajari / Salminen
4 December	SS2	Scorpion 1	13.43 km	Pajari / Salminen	Ford Fiesta R2	11:03.7	Pajari / Salminen
4 December	SS3	Scorpion 2	13.43 km	Sesks / Francis	Ford Fiesta R2	11:03.9	Kristensson / Sjöberg
4 December	SS4	Cinturato 1	16.22 km	Kristensson / Sjöberg	Ford Fiesta R2	13:22.9	Kristensson / Sjöberg
4 December	SS5	Cinturato 2	16.22 km	Kristensson / Sjöberg	Ford Fiesta R2	13:36.7	Kristensson / Sjöberg
4 December	SS6	PZero Grand Prix 1	10.31 km	Kristensson / Sjöberg	Ford Fiesta R2	6:37.7	Kristensson / Sjöberg
5 December	SS7	Selvino 1	25.06 km	Kristensson / Sjöberg	Ford Fiesta R2	21:23.7	Kristensson / Sjöberg
5 December	SS8	Gerosa 1	11.09 km	Bell / Garrod	Ford Fiesta R2	8:10.3	Kristensson / Sjöberg
5 December	SS9	Costa Valle Imagna 1	22.17 km	Pajari / Salminen	Ford Fiesta R2	16:22.7	Kristensson / Sjöberg
5 December	SS10	Selvino 2	25.06 km	Stage cancelled			
5 December	SS11	Gerosa 2	11.09 km	Bell / Garrod	Ford Fiesta R2	8:52.4	Kristensson / Sjöberg
5 December	SS12	Costa Valle Imagna 2	22.17 km	Stage cancelled			
5 December	SS13	PZero Grand Prix 2	10.31 km	Kristensson / Sjöberg	Ford Fiesta R2	6:34.9	Kristensson / Sjöberg
6 December	SS14	PZero Grand Prix 3	10.31 km	Pajari / Salminen	Ford Fiesta R2	6:15.6	Kristensson / Sjöberg
6 December	SS15	Serraglio 1	14.00 km	Kristensson / Sjöberg	Ford Fiesta R2	12:53.6	Kristensson / Sjöberg
6 December	SS16	Serraglio 2	14.00 km	Kristensson / Sjöberg	Ford Fiesta R2	12:49.2	Kristensson / Sjöberg

==== Championship standings ====
- **Bold text** indicates 2020 World Champions.

Pos.	Drivers' championships			Co-drivers' championships			Nations' championships		
Pos.	Move	Driver	Points	Move	Co-driver	Points	Move	Country	Points
1	1	**Tom Kristensson**	100.5	1	**Joakim Sjöberg**	100.5	1	**Sweden**	75
2	1	Sami Pajari	76	1	Marko Salminen	76	1	Latvia	58
3	2	Mārtiņš Sesks	69	2	Renars Francis	69	1	Paraguay	52
4		Fabrizio Zaldívar	61		Fernando Mussano	34	1	Finland	52
5	2	Marco Pollara	42.5	6	Maurizio Messina	30.5	2	United Kingdom	33

== Notes ==
Previous rally: 2020 Rally Italia Sardegna	2020 FIA World Rally Championship	Next rally: 2021 Monte Carlo Rally (2021)
Previous rally: 2019 Monza Rally Show	2020 Rally Monza	Next rally: 2021 Rally Monza
