= 2019 Rally Sweden =

67th edition of Rally Sweden

2019 Rally Sweden: 67. Rally Sweden
Round 2 of 14 in the 2019 World Rally Championship
← Previous event	Next event →
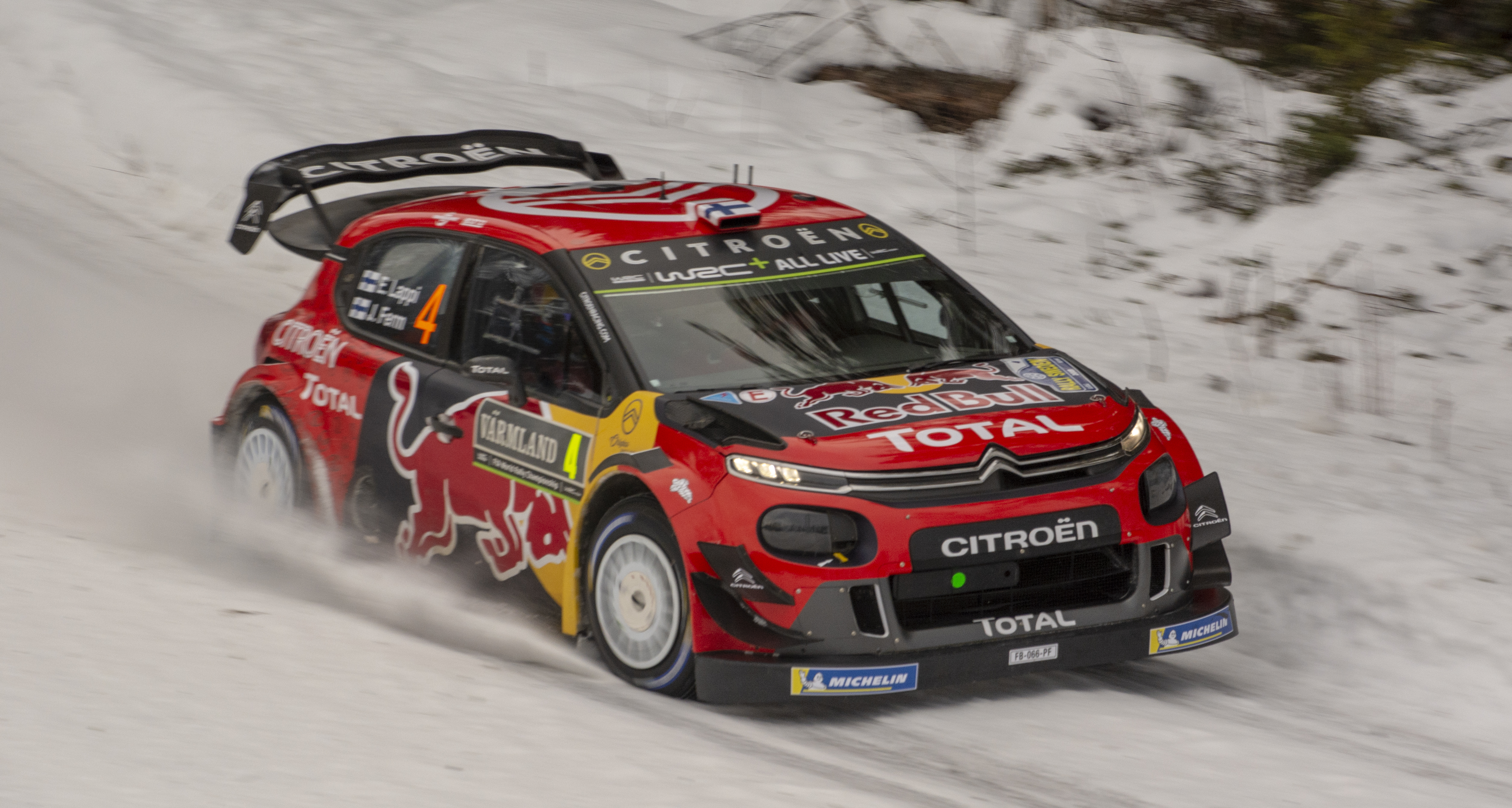
- Rally Sweden was the only snow event on the World Rally Championship calendar.
- Host country: Sweden
- Rally base: Torsby, Värmland
- Dates run: 14 – 17 February 2019
- Start location: Karlstad trotting track, Karlstad
- Finish location: Torsby, Värmland
- Stages: 19 (316.80 km; 196.85 miles)
- Stage surface: Snow
- Transport distance: 1,141.42 km (709.25 miles)
- Overall distance: 1,460.59 km (907.57 miles)

Statistics
- Crews registered: 62
- Crews: 61 at start, 55 at finish

Overall results
- Overall winner: (Estonia) Ott Tänak (Estonia) Martin Järveoja (Japan) Toyota Gazoo Racing WRT; 2:47:30.0
- Power Stage winner: (Estonia) Ott Tänak (Estonia) Martin Järveoja (Japan) Toyota Gazoo Racing WRT

Support category results
- WRC-2 winner: (Norway) Ole Christian Veiby (Sweden) Jonas Andersson (Norway) Ole Christian Veiby; 2:54:04.0
- J-WRC winner: (Sweden) Tom Kristensson (Sweden) Henrik Appelskog (Sweden) Tom Kristensson; 3:14:48.9

The 2019 Rally Sweden (also known as the Rally Sweden 2019) (Swedish: Svenska Rallyt 2019) was a motor racing event for rally cars that was held over four days between 14 and 17 February 2019. It marked the sixty-seventh running of Rally Sweden and was the second round of the 2019 World Rally Championship. It was also the second round of the World Rally Championship-2 and the newly created WRC-2 Pro class, and the first round of the Junior World Rally Championship. The 2019 event was based in the town of Torsby in Värmland County and consists of nineteen special stages. The rally covered a total competitive distance of 319.17 km (198.32 mi).

Thierry Neuville and Nicolas Gilsoul were the defending rally winners. Their team, Hyundai Shell Mobis WRT, were the defending manufacturers' winners. Takamoto Katsuta and Marko Salminen were the defending winners in the World Rally Championship-2 category. Denis Rådström and Johan Johansson were the reigning World Rally Championship-3 and defending Junior World Rally Championship winners, but didn't defend their WRC-3 title as the category was discontinued in 2019.

Ott Tänak and Martin Järveoja became the fourth non-Nordic crew to win the event. Their team, Toyota Gazoo Racing WRT, were the manufacturers' winners. The Citroën Total crew of Mads Østberg and Torstein Eriksen took the victory in the WRC-2 Pro category, while Ole Christian Veiby and Jonas Andersson won the wider WRC-2 class, finishing first in the combined WRC-2 category. This marked the first R5 class victory in the WRC for the new Volkswagen Polo GTI R5. The first round of the J-WRC championship was taken by Tom Kristensson and Henrik Appelskog crew in their maiden appearances.

Jari-Matti Latvala surpassed the record for most starts in the history of the World Rally Championship with his 197th start. The previous record was set by Carlos Sainz, with 196 starts.

== Background ==
=== Championship standings prior to the event ===
Defending world champions Sébastien Ogier and Julien Ingrassia entered the round with an eight-point lead over the defending rally winners Thierry Neuville and Nicolas Gilsoul. Ott Tänak and Martin Järveoja were third, a further four points behind. In the World Rally Championship for Manufacturers, Hyundai Shell Mobis WRT held a five-point lead over Citroën World Rally Team and the defending manufacturers' champions Toyota Gazoo Racing WRT.

In the newly created World Rally Championship-2 Pro standings, Gus Greensmith and Elliott Edmondson held a seven-point lead ahead of Kalle Rovanperä and Jonne Halttunen in the drivers' and co-drivers' standings respectively. In the teams' championship, M-Sport Ford WRT led Škoda Motorsport by seven points.

In the World Rally Championship-2 standings, Yoann Bonato and Benjamin Boulloud led the drivers' and co-drivers' standings by seven points respectively. Adrien Fourmaux and Renaud Jamoul were second, with Ole Christian Veiby and Jonas Andersson in third in each standings, another slender three points behind.

=== Entry list ===
The following crews were entered into the rally. The event was open to crews competing in the World Rally Championship, World Rally Championship-2 and WRC-2 Pro, the Junior World Rally Championship, and privateer entries not registered to score points in any championship. A total of sixty-two entries were received, with fourteen crews entered with World Rally Cars and twenty-three entered the World Rally Championship-2; of these, five were nominated to score points in the Pro class. A further thirteen entries were received for the Junior World Rally Championship.

No.	Driver	Co-Driver	Entrant	Car	Tyre
World Rally Car entries
1	(France) Sébastien Ogier	(France) Julien Ingrassia	(France) Citroën Total WRT	Citroën C3 WRC	MI
3	(Finland) Teemu Suninen	(Finland) Marko Salminen	(United Kingdom) M-Sport Ford WRT	Ford Fiesta WRC	MI
4	(Finland) Esapekka Lappi	(Finland) Janne Ferm	(France) Citroën Total WRT	Citroën C3 WRC	MI
5	(United Kingdom) Kris Meeke	(United Kingdom) Sebastian Marshall	(Japan) Toyota Gazoo Racing WRT	Toyota Yaris WRC	MI
7	(Sweden) Pontus Tidemand	(Norway) Ola Fløene	(United Kingdom) M-Sport Ford WRT	Ford Fiesta WRC	MI
8	(Estonia) Ott Tänak	(Estonia) Martin Järveoja	(Japan) Toyota Gazoo Racing WRT	Toyota Yaris WRC	MI
10	(Finland) Jari-Matti Latvala	(Finland) Miikka Anttila	(Japan) Toyota Gazoo Racing WRT	Toyota Yaris WRC	MI
11	(Belgium) Thierry Neuville	(Belgium) Nicolas Gilsoul	(South Korea) Hyundai Shell Mobis WRT	Hyundai i20 Coupe WRC	MI
19	(France) Sébastien Loeb	(Monaco) Daniel Elena	(South Korea) Hyundai Shell Mobis WRT	Hyundai i20 Coupe WRC	MI
33	(United Kingdom) Elfyn Evans	(United Kingdom) Scott Martin	(United Kingdom) M-Sport Ford WRT	Ford Fiesta WRC	MI
37	(Italy) Lorenzo Bertelli	(Italy) Simone Scattolin	(United Kingdom) M-Sport Ford WRT	Ford Fiesta WRC	MI
68	(Finland) Marcus Grönholm	(Finland) Timo Rautiainen	(Finland) GRX Team (Note: Car entered by GRX Team, but operated by Toyota Gazoo Racing WRT.)	Toyota Yaris WRC	MI
89	(Norway) Andreas Mikkelsen	(Norway) Anders Jæger-Synnevaag	(South Korea) Hyundai Shell Mobis WRT	Hyundai i20 Coupe WRC	MI
92	(Finland) Janne Tuohino	(Finland) Mikko Markkula	(Finland) Janne Tuohino	Ford Fiesta WRC	MI
World Rally Championship-2 Pro entries
21	(Norway) Mads Østberg	(Norway) Torstein Eriksen	(France) Citroën Total (Note: Entry run in conjunction with DG Sport.)	Citroën C3 R5	MI
25	(Finland) Kalle Rovanperä	(Finland) Jonne Halttunen	(Czech Republic) Škoda Motorsport	Škoda Fabia R5	MI
26	(Finland) Eerik Pietarinen	(Finland) Juhana Raitanen	(Czech Republic) Škoda Motorsport (Note: Entry run in conjunction with TGS Worldwide.)	Škoda Fabia R5	P
34	(United Kingdom) Gus Greensmith	(United Kingdom) Elliott Edmondson	(United Kingdom) M-Sport Ford WRT	Ford Fiesta R5	MI
35	(Poland) Łukasz Pieniążek	(Poland) Kamil Heller	(United Kingdom) M-Sport Ford WRT	Ford Fiesta R5	MI
World Rally Championship-2 entries
41	(Japan) Takamoto Katsuta	(United Kingdom) Daniel Barritt	(Japan) Takamoto Katsuta (Note: Entry operated by Tommi Mäkinen Racing.)	Ford Fiesta R5	P
42	(Norway) Ole Christian Veiby	(Sweden) Jonas Andersson	(Norway) Ole Christian Veiby (Note: Entry operated by Baumschlager Rallye & Racing.)	Volkswagen Polo GTI R5	MI
43	(Norway) Henning Solberg	(Austria) Ilka Minor	(Norway) Henning Solberg (Note: Entry operated by Toksport World Rally Team.)	Škoda Fabia R5	MI
44	(Russia) Nikolay Gryazin	(Russia) Yaroslav Fedorov	(Russia) Nikolay Gryazin (Note: Entry operated by Sports Racing Technologies.)	Škoda Fabia R5	P
45	(Sweden) Emil Bergkvist	(Sweden) Patrik Barth	(Sweden) Emil Bergkvist (Note: Entry operated by J-Motorsport.)	Ford Fiesta R5	P
46	(Finland) Jari Huttunen	(Finland) Antti Linnaketo	(Finland) Jari Huttunen (Note: Entry operated by Printsport.)	Škoda Fabia R5	MI
47	(Sweden) Johan Kristoffersson	(Norway) Stig Rune Skjærmoen	(Sweden) Johan Kristoffersson (Note: Entry operated by Volkswagen Dealer Team Bauhaus.)	Volkswagen Polo GTI R5	P
48	(Finland) Emil Lindholm	(Finland) Mikael Korhonen	(Finland) Emil Lindholm	Volkswagen Polo GTI R5	MI
49	(Sweden) Martin Berglund	(Sweden) Joakim Gevert	(Sweden) Martin Berglund	Škoda Fabia R5	P
50	(Sweden) Patrik Flodin	(Sweden) Göran Bergsten	(Sweden) Patrik Flodin	Škoda Fabia R5	P
51	(Sweden) Mattias Monelius	(Sweden) Nicklas Edvardsson	(Sweden) Mattias Monelius	Škoda Fabia R5	P
52	(Sweden) Anton Eriksson	(Sweden) Lars Andersson	(Sweden) Anton Eriksson	Škoda Fabia R5	P
53	(Sweden) Lars Stugemo	(Sweden) Kalle Lexe	(Sweden) Lars Stugemo	Volkswagen Polo GTI R5	MI
54	(Sweden) Joakim Roman	(Sweden) Ida Lidebjer Granberg	(Sweden) Joakim Roman	Škoda Fabia R5	P
55	(United Kingdom) Rhys Yates	(United Kingdom) James Morgan	(United Kingdom) Rhys Yates	Škoda Fabia R5	P
56	(Italy) Tamara Molinaro	(Italy) Lorenzo Granai	(Italy) Tamara Molinaro (Note: Entry operated by Ravasi Corse.)	Citroën C3 R5	P
57	(Turkey) Yigit Timur	(France) Maxime Vilmot	(Turkey) Yigit Timur	Škoda Fabia R5	MI
93	(Norway) Eyvind Brynildsen	(Norway) Veronica Engan	(Norway) Eyvind Brynildsen	Škoda Fabia R5	P
Junior World Rally Championship entries
71	(Sweden) Dennis Rådström	(Sweden) Johan Johansson	(Sweden) Dennis Rådström	Ford Fiesta R2	P
72	(Estonia) Ken Torn	(Estonia) Kuldar Sikk	(Estonia) OT Racing	Ford Fiesta R2	P
73	(Germany) Julius Tannert	(Germany) Helmar Hinneberg	(Germany) ADAC Sachsen	Ford Fiesta R2	P
74	(Sweden) Tom Kristensson	(Sweden) Henrik Appelskog	(Sweden) Tom Kristensson	Ford Fiesta R2	P
75	(Estonia) Roland Poom	(Estonia) Ken Järveoja	(Estonia) Roland Poom	Ford Fiesta R2	P
76	(Latvia) Mārtiņš Sesks	(Latvia) Krišjānis Caune	(Latvia) LMT Autosporta Akadēmija	Ford Fiesta R2	P
77	(United Kingdom) Tom Williams	(United Kingdom) Phil Hall	(United Kingdom) Tom Williams	Ford Fiesta R2	P
78	(Spain) Jan Solans	(Spain) Mauro Barreiro	Rally Team Spain	Ford Fiesta R2	P
79	(Romania) Raul Badiu	(Romania) Gabriel Lazar	(Romania) Raul Badiu	Ford Fiesta R2	P
80	(Germany) Nico Knacker	(Germany) Tobias Braun	(Germany) ADAC Weiser-Ems	Ford Fiesta R2	P
81	(Italy) Enrico Oldrati	(Italy) Elia De Guio	(Italy) Enrico Oldrati	Ford Fiesta R2	P
82	(Paraguay) Fabrizio Zaldívar	(Argentina) Fernando Mussano	(Paraguay) Fabrizio Zaldívar	Ford Fiesta R2	P
83	(United States) Sean Johnston	(United States) Alex Kihurani	(United States) Sean Johnston	Ford Fiesta R2	P
Other Major Entries
104	(France) Adrien Fourmaux	(Belgium) Renaud Jamoul	(France) Adrien Fourmaux	Ford Fiesta R2	P

=== Route ===
The route of the 2019 rally is made up of 319.17 km (198.32 mi) in competitive stages, some 4.92 km (3.06 mi) longer than the 2018 event. The Rämmen stage will return replace the Torntorp stage. Rämmen is due to be run as SS9 and SS12 and will run in the opposite direction to previous years.

==== Itinerary ====
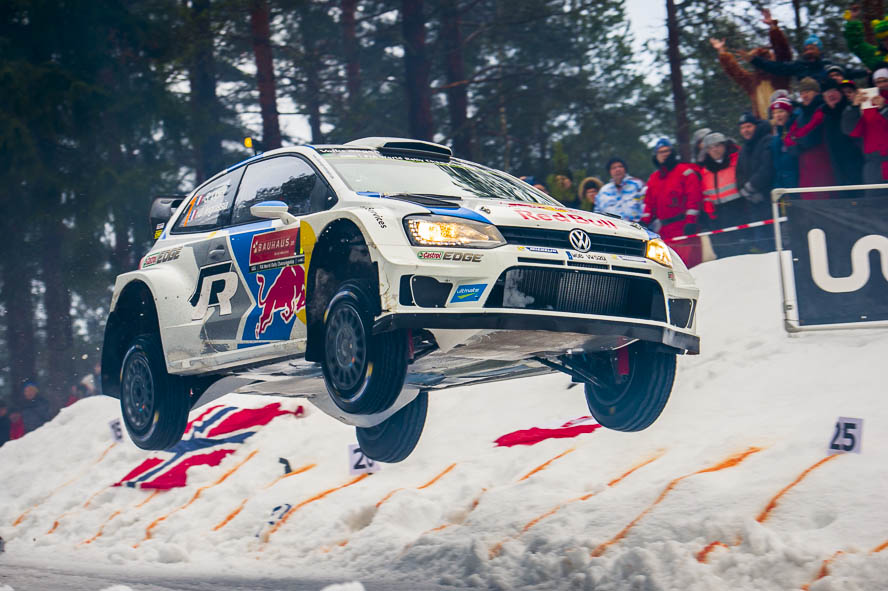
Sébastien Ogier and Julien Ingrassia driving a Volkswagen Polo R WRC at Colin's Crest Arena during Vargåsen.

All dates and times are CET (UTC+1).

Date	Time	No.	Stage name	Distance
14 February	9:00	—	Skalla [Shakedown]	6.86 km
Leg 1 — 139.31 km
14 February	20:08	SS1	Karlstad SSS 1	1.90 km
15 February	7:55	SS2	Hof-Finnskog 1	21.26 km
15 February	9:08	SS3	Svullrya 1	24.88 km
15 February	9:59	SS4	Röjden 1	18.10 km
15 February	13:54	SS5	Hof-Finnskog 2	21.26 km
15 February	15:17	SS6	Svullrya 2	24.88 km
15 February	16:08	SS7	Röjden 2	18.10 km
15 February	17:04	SS8	Torsby 1	8.93 km
Leg 2 — 126.18 km
16 February	7:44	SS9	Rämmen 1	23.13 km
16 February	8:35	SS10	Hagfors 1	23.40 km
16 February	9:37	SS11	Vargåsen 1	14.21 km
16 February	13:02	SS12	Rämmen 2	23.13 km
16 February	13:53	SS13	Hagfors 2	23.40 km
16 February	15:08	SS14	Vargåsen 2	14.21 km
16 February	17:45	SS15	Karlstad SSS 2	1.90 km
16 February	19:30	SS16	Torsby Sprint	2.80 km
Leg 3 — 51.31 km
17 February	7:50	SS16	Likenäs 1	21.19 km
17 February	9:51	SS17	Likenäs 2	21.19 km
17 February	12:18	SS18	Torsby 2 [Power Stage]	8.93 km

== Report ==
=== World Rally Cars ===
Being first on the road meant Sébastien Ogier and Julien Ingrassia have to endure changeable conditions and unpredictable grip. As it turned out, it is highly risky. The six-time World Champions went off the road on Svullrya and stuck in the snowbank, which forced them to retire from the first leg. The other major victim was Jari-Matti Latvala and Miikka Anttila crew, who went wide over a crest on the final stage of Friday and cost them nearly twenty-four minutes to get unstuck. They chose to run under Rally2 regulation so that they reduced the time loss to ten minutes.

The second leg of the rally appeared to be a total disaster for Teemu Suninen and Marko Salminen. Having led a rally for the first time ever, they beached their Fiesta at a left-hand corner, which dropped them down to eighth. Worse still, at the afternoon loop, they hit a tree and damaged their roll cage, which forced them to retire from the day. Following the retirement of Suninen and Salminen, Ott Tänak and Martin Järveoja were comfortable in the lead.

Eventually, The Estonian crew comfortably took their first snow-surfaced rally victory. With the win, they led in both the drivers' and co-drivers' standings for the first time ever in their career by seven points. Their team, defending manufacturers' champions Toyota Gazoo Racing WRT also led the championship by one point. Esapekka Lappi and Janne Ferm crew managed to keep themselves ahead of Thierry Neuville and Nicolas Gilsoul with just a three seconds of advantage.

==== Classification ====
Position		No.	Driver	Co-driver	Entrant	Car	Time	Difference	Points	
Event	Class	No.	Driver	Co-driver	Entrant	Car	Time	Difference	Event	Stage
1	1	8	Ott Tänak	Martin Järveoja	Toyota Gazoo Racing WRT	Toyota Yaris WRC	2:47:30.0	0.0	25	5
2	2	4	Esapekka Lappi	Janne Ferm	Citroën Total WRT	Citroën C3 WRC	2:48:23.7	+53.7	18	1
3	3	11	Thierry Neuville	Nicolas Gilsoul	Hyundai Shell Mobis WRT	Hyundai i20 Coupe WRC	2:48:26.7	+56.7	15	4
4	4	89	Andreas Mikkelsen	Anders Jæger-Synnevaag	Hyundai Shell Mobis WRT	Hyundai i20 Coupe WRC	2:48:35.4	+1:05.4	12	0
5	5	33	Elfyn Evans	Scott Martin	M-Sport Ford WRT	Ford Fiesta WRC	2:48:38.2	+1:08.2	10	3
6	6	5	Kris Meeke	Sebastian Marshall	Toyota Gazoo Racing WRT	Toyota Yaris WRC	2:49:08.8	+1:38.8	8	0
7	7	19	Sébastien Loeb	Daniel Elena	Hyundai Shell Mobis WRT	Hyundai i20 Coupe WRC	2:49:19.7	+1:49.7	6	0
8	8	7	Pontus Tidemand	Ola Fløene	M-Sport Ford WRT	Ford Fiesta WRC	2:51:07.7	+3:37.7	4	0
21	9	10	Jari-Matti Latvala	Miikka Anttila	Toyota Gazoo Racing WRT	Toyota Yaris WRC	3:02:14.4	+14:44.4	0	0
23	10	3	Teemu Suninen	Marko Salminen	M-Sport Ford WRT	Ford Fiesta WRC	3:03:54.5	+16:24.5	0	0
29	11	1	Sébastien Ogier	Julien Ingrassia	Citroën Total WRT	Citroën C3 WRC	3:11:49.0	+24:19.0	0	2

==== Special stages ====
Date	No.	Stage name	Distance	Winners	Car	Time	Class leaders
14 February	—	Skalla [Shakedown]	6.86 km	Neuville / Gilsoul	Hyundai i20 Coupe WRC	4:05.0	—N/a
14 February	SS1	Karlstad SSS 1	1.90 km	Neuville / Gilsoul	Hyundai i20 Coupe WRC	1:34.9	Neuville / Gilsoul
15 February	SS2	Hof-Finnskog 1	21.26 km	Tänak / Järveoja	Toyota Yaris WRC	10:09.1	Tänak / Järveoja
15 February	SS3	Svullrya 1	24.88 km	Suninen / Salminen	Ford Fiesta WRC	12:47.0	Tänak / Järveoja
15 February	SS4	Röjden 1	18.10 km	Tänak / Järveoja	Toyota Yaris WRC	8:42.5	Tänak / Järveoja
15 February	SS5	Hof-Finnskog 2	21.26 km	Evans / Martin	Ford Fiesta WRC	10:02.8	Latvala / Anttila
15 February	SS6	Svullrya 2	24.88 km	Suninen / Salminen	Ford Fiesta WRC	12:43.9	Suninen / Salminen
15 February	SS7	Röjden 2	18.10 km	Evans / Martin	Ford Fiesta WRC	10:02.8	Suninen / Salminen
15 February	SS8	Torsby 1	8.93 km	Lappi / Ferm (Note: Jari Huttunen and Antti Linnaketo were placed first overall on the stage.)	Citroën C3 WRC	5:50.0	Suninen / Salminen
16 February	SS9	Rämmen 1	23.13 km	Latvala / Anttila	Toyota Yaris WRC	11:23.1	Tänak / Järveoja
16 February	SS10	Hagfors 1	23.40 km	Ogier / Ingrassia	Citroën C3 WRC	12:33.1	Tänak / Järveoja
16 February	SS11	Vargåsen 1	14.21 km	Ogier / Ingrassia	Citroën C3 WRC	8:14.9	Tänak / Järveoja
16 February	SS12	Rämmen 2	23.13 km	Tänak / Järveoja	Toyota Yaris WRC	11:21.4	Tänak / Järveoja
16 February	SS13	Hagfors 2	23.40 km	Tänak / Järveoja	Toyota Yaris WRC	12:36.8	Tänak / Järveoja
16 February	SS14	Vargåsen 2	14.21 km	Ogier / Ingrassia	Citroën C3 WRC	8:20.1	Tänak / Järveoja
16 February	SS15	Karlstad SSS 2	1.90 km	Tänak / Järveoja	Toyota Yaris WRC	1:36.0	Tänak / Järveoja
16 February	SS16	Torsby Sprint	2.80 km	Neuville / Gilsoul	Hyundai i20 Coupe WRC	1:56.8	Tänak / Järveoja
17 February	SS17	Likenäs 1	21.19 km	Latvala / Anttila	Toyota Yaris WRC	11:06.3	Tänak / Järveoja
17 February	SS18	Likenäs 2	21.19 km	Evans / Martin	Ford Fiesta WRC	11:22.0	Tänak / Järveoja
17 February	SS19	Torsby 2 [Power Stage]	8.93 km	Tänak / Järveoja	Toyota Yaris WRC	5:15.1	Tänak / Järveoja

==== Championship standings ====
Pos.	Drivers' championships			Co-drivers' championships			Manufacturers' championships		
Pos.	Move	Driver	Points	Move	Co-driver	Points	Move	Manufacturer	Points
1	2	Ott Tänak	47	2	Martin Järveoja	47	2	Toyota Gazoo Racing WRT	58
2		Thierry Neuville	40		Nicolas Gilsoul	40	1	Hyundai Shell Mobis WRT	57
3	2	Sébastien Ogier	31	2	Julien Ingrassia	31	1	Citroën Total WRT	47
4		Kris Meeke	21		Sebastian Marshall	21		M-Sport Ford WRT	30
5	9	Esapekka Lappi	19	9	Janne Ferm	19			

=== World Rally Championship-2 Pro ===
==== Classification ====
Position		No.	Driver	Co-driver	Entrant	Car	Time	Difference	Points	
Event	Class	No.	Driver	Co-driver	Entrant	Car	Time	Difference	Class	Event
11	1	21	Mads Østberg	Torstein Eriksen	Citroën Total	Citroën C3 R5	2:55:54.5	0.0	**25**	**0**
18	2	25	Kalle Rovanperä	Jonne Halttunen	Škoda Motorsport	Škoda Fabia R5	2:59:13.7	+3:19.2	**18**	**0**
19	3	34	Gus Greensmith	Elliott Edmondson	M-Sport Ford WRT	Ford Fiesta R5	3:00:43.4	+4:48.9	**15**	**0**
50	4	35	Łukasz Pieniążek	Kamil Heller	M-Sport Ford WRT	Ford Fiesta R5	3:52:56.7	+57:02.2	**12**	**0**
Retired SS19		26	Eerik Pietarinen	Juhana Raitanen	Škoda Motorsport	Škoda Fabia R5	Accident		**0**	**0**

==== Special stages ====
Results in bold denote first in the RC2 class, the class which both the WRC-2 Pro and WRC-2 championships run to.

Date	No.	Stage name	Distance	Winners	Car	Time	Class leaders
14 February	—	Skalla [Shakedown]	6.86 km	Rovanperä / Halttunen	Škoda Fabia R5	4:14.7	—N/a
14 February	SS1	Karlstad SSS 1	1.90 km	**Pietarinen / Raitanen**	Škoda Fabia R5	1:39.3	Pietarinen / Raitanen
15 February	SS2	Hof-Finnskog 1	21.26 km	Rovanperä / Halttunen	Škoda Fabia R5	10:40.6	Rovanperä / Halttunen
15 February	SS3	Svullrya 1	24.88 km	Østberg / Eriksen	Citroën C3 R5	13:29.9	Østberg / Eriksen
15 February	SS4	Röjden 1	18.10 km	Østberg / Eriksen; Rovanperä / Halttunen	Citroën C3 R5; Škoda Fabia R5	9:11.9	Østberg / Eriksen
15 February	SS5	Hof-Finnskog 2	21.26 km	Rovanperä / Halttunen	Škoda Fabia R5	10:31.1	Østberg / Eriksen
15 February	SS6	Svullrya 2	24.88 km	**Rovanperä / Halttunen**	Škoda Fabia R5	13:06.8	Østberg / Eriksen
15 February	SS7	Röjden 2	18.10 km	**Rovanperä / Halttunen**	Škoda Fabia R5	9:01.3	Østberg / Eriksen
15 February	SS8	Torsby 1	8.93 km	Østberg / Eriksen	Citroën C3 R5	5:57.5	Østberg / Eriksen
16 February	SS9	Rämmen 1	23.13 km	Rovanperä / Halttunen	Škoda Fabia R5	12:02.8	Østberg / Eriksen
16 February	SS10	Hagfors 1	23.40 km	Rovanperä / Halttunen	Škoda Fabia R5	13:11.8	Østberg / Eriksen
16 February	SS11	Vargåsen 1	14.21 km	Rovanperä / Halttunen	Škoda Fabia R5	8:32.4	Østberg / Eriksen
16 February	SS12	Rämmen 2	23.13 km	**Rovanperä / Halttunen**	Škoda Fabia R5	11:48.2	Østberg / Eriksen
16 February	SS13	Hagfors 2	23.40 km	Pietarinen / Raitanen	Škoda Fabia R5	13:08.7	Østberg / Eriksen
16 February	SS14	Vargåsen 2	14.21 km	Rovanperä / Halttunen	Škoda Fabia R5	8:37.2	Østberg / Eriksen
16 February	SS15	Karlstad SSS 2	1.90 km	Rovanperä / Halttunen	Škoda Fabia R5	1:38.5	Østberg / Eriksen
16 February	SS16	Torsby Sprint	2.80 km	Rovanperä / Halttunen	Škoda Fabia R5	2:01.2	Østberg / Eriksen
17 February	SS17	Likenäs 1	21.19 km	Rovanperä / Halttunen	Škoda Fabia R5	11:51.3	Østberg / Eriksen
17 February	SS18	Likenäs 2	21.19 km	Rovanperä / Halttunen	Škoda Fabia R5	11:51.9	Østberg / Eriksen
17 February	SS19	Torsby 2	8.93 km	Østberg / Eriksen	Citroën C3 R5	5:35.1	Østberg / Eriksen

==== Championship standings ====
Pos.	Drivers' championships			Co-drivers' championships			Manufacturers' championships		
Pos.	Move	Driver	Points	Move	Co-driver	Points	Move	Manufacturer	Points
1		Gus Greensmith	40		Elliott Edmondson	40		M-Sport Ford WRT	52
2		Kalle Rovanperä	36		Jonne Halttunen	36		Škoda Motorsport	36
3		Mads Østberg	25		Torstein Eriksen	25		Citroën Total	25
4		Łukasz Pieniążek	12		Kamil Heller	12			
5		Eerik Pietarinen	0		Juhana Raitanen	0			

=== World Rally Championship-2 ===
==== Classification ====
Position		No.	Driver	Co-driver	Entrant	Car	Time	Difference	Points	
Event	Class	No.	Driver	Co-driver	Entrant	Car	Time	Difference	Class	Event
9	1	42	Ole Christian Veiby	Jonas Andersson	Ole Christian Veiby	Volkswagen Polo GTI R5	2:54:04.0	0.0	25	2
12	2	48	Emil Lindholm	Mikael Korhonen	Emil Lindholm	Volkswagen Polo GTI R5	2:56:07.5	+2:03.5	18	0
13	3	47	Johan Kristoffersson	Stig Rune Skjærmoen	Johan Kristoffersson	Volkswagen Polo GTI R5	2:56:23.6	+2:19.6	15	0
14	4	45	Emil Bergkvist	Patrik Barth	Emil Bergkvist	Ford Fiesta R5	2:56:32.8	+2:28.8	12	0
15	5	44	Nikolay Gryazin	Yaroslav Fedorov	Nikolay Gryazin	Škoda Fabia R5	2:57:08.4	+3:04.4	10	0
16	6	93	Eyvind Brynildsen	Veronica Engan	Eyvind Brynildsen	Škoda Fabia R5	2:58:38.3	+4:34.3	8	0
17	7	43	Henning Solberg	Ilka Minor	Henning Solberg	Škoda Fabia R5	2:58:39.5	+4:35.5	6	0
22	8	50	Patrik Flodin	Göran Bergsten	Patrik Flodin	Škoda Fabia R5	3:03:10.1	+9:06.1	4	0
24	9	51	Mattias Monelius	Nicklas Edvardsson	Mattias Monelius	Škoda Fabia R5	3:06:07.7	+12:03.7	2	0
25	10	55	Rhys Yates	James Morgan	Rhys Yates	Škoda Fabia R5	3:06:53.4	+12:49.4	1	0
28	11	56	Tamara Molinaro	Lorenzo Granai	Tamara Molinaro	Citroën C3 R5	3:11:00.0	+16:56.0	0	0
32	12	54	Joakim Roman	Ida Lidebjer Granberg	Joakim Roman	Škoda Fabia R5	3:16:22.0	+22:18.0	0	0
40	13	52	Anton Eriksson	Lars Andersson	Anton Eriksson	Škoda Fabia R5	3:31:41.4	+37:37.4	0	0
48	14	57	Yigit Timur	Maxime Vilmot	Yigit Timur	Škoda Fabia R5	3:50:56.1	+56:52.1	0	0
51	15	53	Lars Stugemo	Kalle Lexe	Lars Stugemo	Volkswagen Polo GTI R5	3:54:19.5	+1:00:15.5	0	0
Retired SS19		41	Takamoto Katsuta	Daniel Barritt	Takamoto Katsuta	Ford Fiesta R5	Accident		0	0
Retired SS18		46	Jari Huttunen	Antti Linnaketo	Jari Huttunen	Ford Fiesta R5	Accident		0	0
Retired SS6		49	Martin Berglund	Joakim Gevert	Martin Berglund	Ford Fiesta R5	Mechanical		0	0

==== Special stages ====
Results in bold denote first in the RC2 class, the class which both the WRC-2 Pro and WRC-2 championships run to.

Date	No.	Stage name	Distance	Winners	Car	Time	Class leaders
14 February	—	Skalla [Shakedown]	6.86 km	**Kristoffersson / Skjærmoen**	Volkswagen Polo GTI R5	4:14.1	—N/a
14 February	SS1	Karlstad SSS 1	1.90 km	**Huttunen / Linnaketo**	Škoda Fabia R5	1:39.3	Huttunen / Linnaketo
15 February	SS2	Hof-Finnskog 1	21.26 km	**Kristoffersson / Skjærmoen**	Volkswagen Polo GTI R5	10:39.5	Kristoffersson / Skjærmoen
15 February	SS3	Svullrya 1	24.88 km	**Veiby / Andersson**	Volkswagen Polo GTI R5	13:21.6	Veiby / Andersson
15 February	SS4	Röjden 1	18.10 km	**Veiby / Andersson**	Volkswagen Polo GTI R5	9:08.0	Veiby / Andersson
15 February	SS5	Hof-Finnskog 2	21.26 km	**Veiby / Andersson**	Volkswagen Polo GTI R5	10:25.9	Veiby / Andersson
15 February	SS6	Svullrya 2	24.88 km	Huttunen / Linnaketo	Škoda Fabia R5	13:14.8	Veiby / Andersson
15 February	SS7	Röjden 2	18.10 km	Huttunen / Linnaketo	Škoda Fabia R5	9:02.3	Veiby / Andersson
15 February	SS8	Torsby 1	8.93 km	**Huttunen / Linnaketo**	Škoda Fabia R5	5:50.0	Veiby / Andersson
16 February	SS9	Rämmen 1	23.13 km	**Veiby / Andersson**	Volkswagen Polo GTI R5	12:00.0	Veiby / Andersson
16 February	SS10	Hagfors 1	23.40 km	**Huttunen / Linnaketo**	Škoda Fabia R5	13:09.4	Veiby / Andersson
16 February	SS11	Vargåsen 1	14.21 km	**Veiby / Andersson**	Volkswagen Polo GTI R5	8:32.2	Veiby / Andersson
16 February	SS12	Rämmen 2	23.13 km	Veiby / Andersson	Volkswagen Polo GTI R5	11:49.8	Veiby / Andersson
16 February	SS13	Hagfors 2	23.40 km	**Huttunen / Linnaketo**	Škoda Fabia R5	13:05.0	Veiby / Andersson
16 February	SS14	Vargåsen 2	14.21 km	**Huttunen / Linnaketo**	Škoda Fabia R5	8:31.8	Veiby / Andersson
16 February	SS15	Karlstad SSS 2	1.90 km	**Huttunen / Linnaketo**	Škoda Fabia R5	1:37.4	Veiby / Andersson
16 February	SS16	Torsby Sprint	2.80 km	**Huttunen / Linnaketo**	Škoda Fabia R5	1:58.9	Veiby / Andersson
17 February	SS17	Likenäs 1	21.19 km	**Veiby / Andersson**	Volkswagen Polo GTI R5	11:39.9	Veiby / Andersson
17 February	SS18	Likenäs 2	21.19 km	**Veiby / Andersson**	Volkswagen Polo GTI R5	11:42.4	Veiby / Andersson
17 February	SS19	Torsby 2	8.93 km	**Kristoffersson / Skjærmoen**	Volkswagen Polo GTI R5	5:34.2	Veiby / Andersson

==== Championship standings ====
Pos.	Drivers' championships			Co-drivers' championships		
Pos.	Move	Driver	Points	Move	Co-driver	Points
1	2	Ole Christian Veiby	40	2	Jonas Andersson	40
2	1	Yoann Bonato	25	1	Benjamin Boulloud	25
3	1	Adrien Fourmaux	18	1	Renaud Jamoul	18
4		Emil Bergkvist	18		Patrik Barth	18
5		Johan Kristoffersson	15		Stig Rune Skjærmoen	15

=== Junior World Rally Championship ===
==== Classification ====
Position		No.	Driver	Co-driver	Entrant	Car	Time	Difference	Points	
Event	Class	No.	Driver	Co-driver	Entrant	Car	Time	Difference	Class	Stage
30	1	74	Tom Kristensson	Henrik Appelskog	Tom Kristensson	Ford Fiesta R2	3:14:48.9	0.0	25	1
31	2	75	Roland Poom	Ken Järveoja	Roland Poom	Ford Fiesta R2	3:16:20.1	+1:31.2	18	0
33	3	78	Jan Solans	Mauro Barreiro	Rally Team Spain	Ford Fiesta R2	3:18:58.1	+4:09.2	15	1
34	4	77	Tom Williams	Phil Hall	Tom Williams	Ford Fiesta R2	3:21:42.3	+6:53.4	12	0
35	5	83	Sean Johnston	Alex Kihurani	Sean Johnston	Ford Fiesta R2	3:26:32.0	+11:43.1	10	0
37	6	76	Mārtiņš Sesks	Krišjānis Caune	LMT Autosporta Akadēmija	Ford Fiesta R2	3:28:09.8	+13:20.9	8	3
39	7	81	Enrico Oldrati	Elia De Guio	Enrico Oldrati	Ford Fiesta R2	3:31:12.7	+16:23.8	6	0
42	8	71	Dennis Rådström	Johan Johansson	Dennis Rådström	Ford Fiesta R2	3:38:20.0	+23:31.1	4	12
43	9	82	Fabrizio Zaldívar	Fernando Mussano	Fabrizio Zaldívar	Ford Fiesta R2	3:38:35.9	+23:47.0	2	0
44	10	72	Ken Torn	Kuldar Sikk	OT Racing	Ford Fiesta R2	3:38:48.9	+24:00.0	1	2
52	11	73	Julius Tannert	Helmar Hinneberg	ADAC Sachsen	Ford Fiesta R2	3:56:13.7	+41:24.8	0	0
53	12	80	Nico Knacker	Tobias Braun	ADAC Weiser-Ems	Ford Fiesta R2	4:03:58.2	+49:09.3	0	0
54	13	79	Raul Badiu	Gabriel Lazar	Raul Badiu	Ford Fiesta R2	4:08:27.7	+53:38.8	0	0

==== Special stages ====
Date	No.	Stage name	Distance	Winners	Car	Time	Class leaders
14 February	—	Skalla [Shakedown]	6.86 km	Torn / Sikk	Ford Fiesta R2	4:38.3	—N/a
14 February	SS1	Karlstad SSS 1	1.90 km	Rådström / Johansson	Ford Fiesta R2	1:50.9	Rådström / Johansson
15 February	SS2	Hof-Finnskog 1	21.26 km	Sesks / Caune	Ford Fiesta R2	11:33.9	Sesks / Caune
15 February	SS3	Svullrya 1	24.88 km	Kristensson / Appelskog	Ford Fiesta R2	14:36.5	Sesks / Caune
15 February	SS4	Röjden 1	18.10 km	Rådström / Johansson	Ford Fiesta R2	10:00.5	Kristensson / Appelskog
15 February	SS5	Hof-Finnskog 2	21.26 km	Rådström / Johansson	Ford Fiesta R2	11:27.3	Kristensson / Appelskog
15 February	SS6	Svullrya 2	24.88 km	Rådström / Johansson	Ford Fiesta R2	14:36.1	Rådström / Johansson
15 February	SS7	Röjden 2	18.10 km	Rådström / Johansson	Ford Fiesta R2	9:54.1	Rådström / Johansson
15 February	SS8	Torsby 1	8.93 km	Rådström / Johansson	Ford Fiesta R2	6:31.6	Rådström / Johansson
16 February	SS9	Rämmen 1	23.13 km	Rådström / Johansson	Ford Fiesta R2	13:00.9	Rådström / Johansson
16 February	SS10	Hagfors 1	23.40 km	Rådström / Johansson	Ford Fiesta R2	14:18.2	Rådström / Johansson
16 February	SS11	Vargåsen 1	14.21 km	Rådström / Johansson	Ford Fiesta R2	9:22.2	Rådström / Johansson
16 February	SS12	Rämmen 2	23.13 km	Rådström / Johansson	Ford Fiesta R2	12:51.3	Rådström / Johansson
16 February	SS13	Hagfors 2	23.40 km	Sesks / Caune	Ford Fiesta R2	14:20.2	Kristensson / Appelskog
16 February	SS14	Vargåsen 2	14.21 km	Torn / Sikk	Ford Fiesta R2	9:27.3	Kristensson / Appelskog
16 February	SS15	Karlstad SSS 2	1.90 km	Torn / Sikk	Ford Fiesta R2	1:48.2	Kristensson / Appelskog
16 February	SS16	Torsby Sprint	2.80 km	Solans / Barreiro	Ford Fiesta R2	2:14.6	Kristensson / Appelskog
17 February	SS17	Likenäs 1	21.19 km	Rådström / Johansson	Ford Fiesta R2	13:05.0	Kristensson / Appelskog
17 February	SS18	Likenäs 2	21.19 km	Sesks / Caune	Ford Fiesta R2	12:49.9	Kristensson / Appelskog
17 February	SS19	Torsby 2	8.93 km	Rådström / Johansson	Ford Fiesta R2	6:01.5	Kristensson / Appelskog

==== Championship standings ====
Pos.	Drivers' championships			Co-drivers' championships			Nations' championships		
Pos.	Move	Driver	Points	Move	Co-driver	Points	Move	Country	Points
1		Tom Kristensson	26		Henrik Appelskog	26		Sweden	25
2		Roland Poom	18		Ken Järveoja	18		Estonia	18
3		Jan Solans	16		Mauro Barreiro	16		Spain	15
4		Dennis Rådström	16		Johan Johansson	16		United Kingdom	12
5		Tom Williams	12		Phil Hall	12		United States	10

== Notes ==
Previous rally: 2019 Monte Carlo Rally	2019 FIA World Rally Championship	Next rally: 2019 Rally Mexico
Previous rally: 2018 Rally Sweden	2019 Rally Sweden	Next rally: 2020 Rally Sweden
