= Sean Johnston (rally driver) =

American rally driver

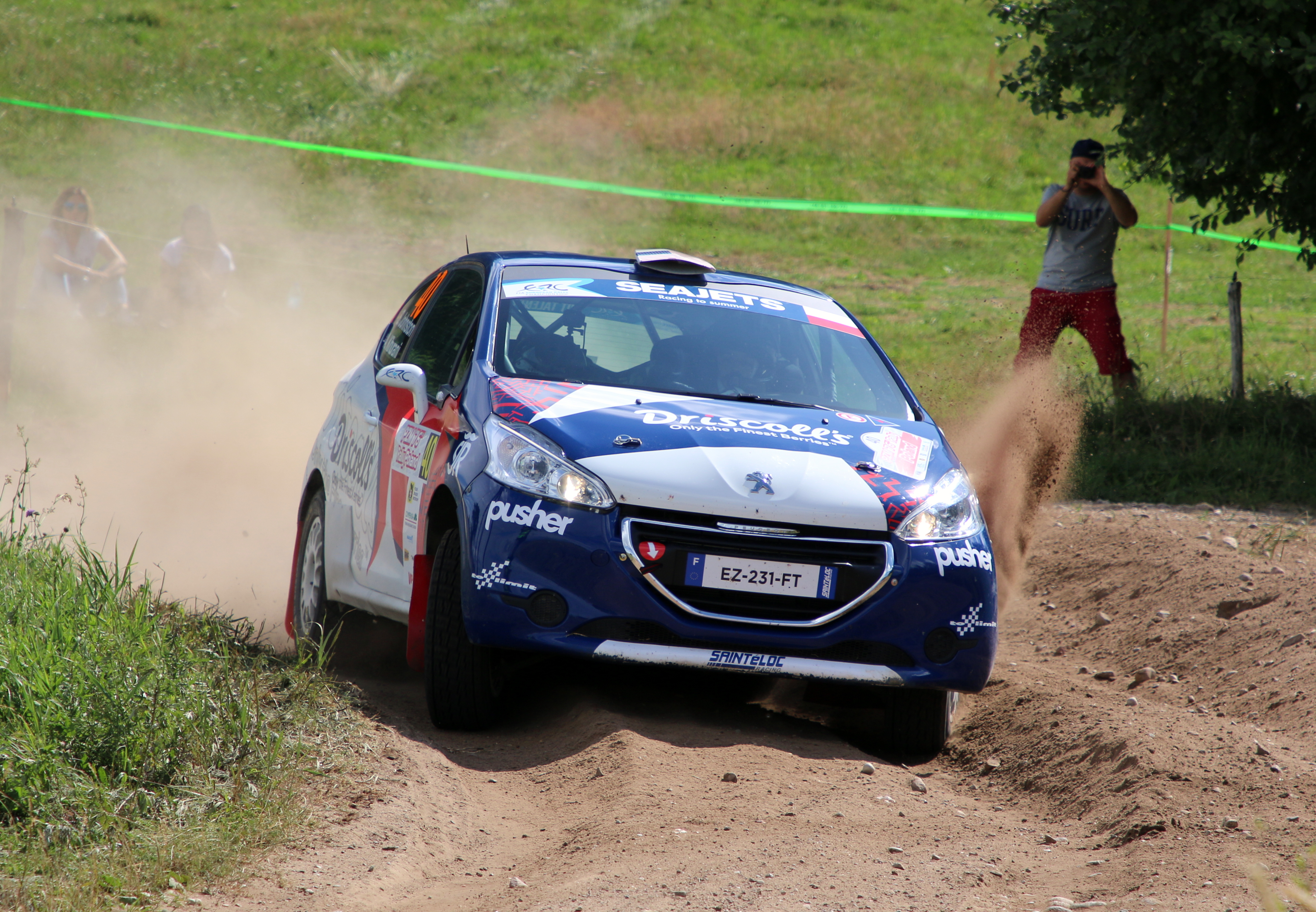

Personal information
- Nationality: (United States) American
- Born: 17 November 1990 (age 35)

World Rally Championship record
- Years active: 2019–present
- Co-driver: (United States) Alex Kihurani
- Rallies: 21
- Championships: 0
- Rally wins: 0
- Podiums: 0
- Stage wins: 0
- Total points: 0
- First rally: 2019 Rally Sweden

Sean Johnston (born 17 November 1990) is an American rally driver who last competed in World Rally Championship-2. He began his racing career in 2011 in the North American Nissan GT Academy, a televised competition that took the fastest sim racers in Gran Turismo to compete in real cars to win a professional racing contract with Nissan. After finishing second in the competition, Johnston competed in the IMSA GT3 Cup Challenge the following year, claiming 14 podiums from 15 races and winning the championship. In 2013, Johnston moved to Europe to compete in the Porsche Carrera Cup Germany and Porsche Mobil 1 Supercup. In 2018, Johnston switched to rallying, competing alongside co-driver Alex Kihurani. Johnston's first rallying win came at the 2020 Rallye Automobile Monte Carlo, where he won the RC4 class, becoming the first American with a class win at the event. Johnston and Kihurani drove the Citroën C3 Rally2 for Saintéloc Junior Team.

== Career results ==
=== WRC results ===
Year	Entrant	Car	1	2	3	4	5	6	7	8	9	10	11	12	13	14	WDC	Points
2019	Sean Johnston	Ford Fiesta R2	MON	SWE; 35	MEX	FRA; Ret	ARG	CHL	POR	ITA; Ret	FIN; 27	GER	TUR	GBR; 26	ESP	AUS; C	NC	0
2020	Sean Johnston	Peugeot 208 R2	MON; 27	SWE	MEX												NC	0
2020	Saintéloc Junior Team	Citroën C3 R5				EST; 21	TUR; Ret	ITA; Ret	MNZ								NC	0
2021	Saintéloc Junior Team	Citroën C3 Rally2	MON; 17	ARC; 30	CRO	POR	ITA; Ret	KEN	EST; Ret	BEL	GRE; 17	FIN	ESP; 19	MNZ			NC	0
2022	Saintéloc Junior Team	Citroën C3 Rally2	MON; 11	SWE	CRO; 19	POR; Ret	ITA	KEN; 11	EST; 22	FIN	BEL	GRE	NZL	ESP	JPN; 13		NC	0

* Season still in progress.

=== WRC-2 results ===
Year	Entrant	Car	1	2	3	4	5	6	7	8	9	10	11	12	13	WDC	Points
2021	Saintéloc Junior Team	Citroën C3 Rally2	MON; 5	ARC; 7	CRO	POR	ITA; Ret	KEN	EST; Ret	BEL	GRE; 6	FIN	ESP; 5	MNZ		13th	35
2022	Saintéloc Junior Team	Citroën C3 Rally2	MON; 4	SWE	CRO; 11	POR; Ret	ITA	KEN; 2	EST; 10	FIN	BEL	GRE	NZL	ESP	JPN; 6	11th	41

* Season still in progress.

=== WRC-3 results ===
Year	Entrant	Car	1	2	3	4	5	6	7	WDC	Points
2020	Saintéloc Junior Team	Citroën C3 R5	MON	SWE	MEX	EST; 8	TUR; Ret	ITA; Ret	MNZ	34th	4

=== J-WRC results ===
Year	Entrant	Car	1	2	3	4	5	WDC	Points
2019	Sean Johnston	Ford Fiesta R2	SWE; 5	FRA; Ret	ITA; Ret	FIN; 5	GBR; 3	4th	50

=== Sports Car Racing ===
==== American Le Mans Series ====
Year	Entrant	Class	Chassis	Engine	1	2	3	4	5	6	7	8	9	10	Rank	Points
2012	JDX Racing	GTC	Porsche 997 GT3 Cup	Porsche 4.0 L Flat-6	SEB	LBH	LGA	LIM	MOS	MOH	ROA	BAL	VIR	ATL ovr:28 cls:4	24th	17

==== IMSA SportsCar Championship ====
Year	Entrant	Class	Chassis	Engine	1	2	3	4	5	6	7	8	9	10	11	Rank	Points
2015	Performance Tech Motorsports	PC	Oreca FLM09	Chevrolet LS3 6.2 L V8	DAY; 7	SEB	LGA	BEL	WGL	MOS	LIM	ROA	COTA	ATL		39th	1
2016	Starworks Motorsport	PC	Oreca FLM09	Chevrolet LS3 6.2 L V8	DAY; 7	SEB; 7	LBH	LGA	BEL	WGL	MOS	LIM	ROA	COTA	ATL	27th	26
