= 2019 Wales Rally GB =

Rally car race

2019 Wales Rally GB: 75. Wales Rally GB
Round 12 of 14 in the 2019 World Rally Championship
← Previous event	Next event →
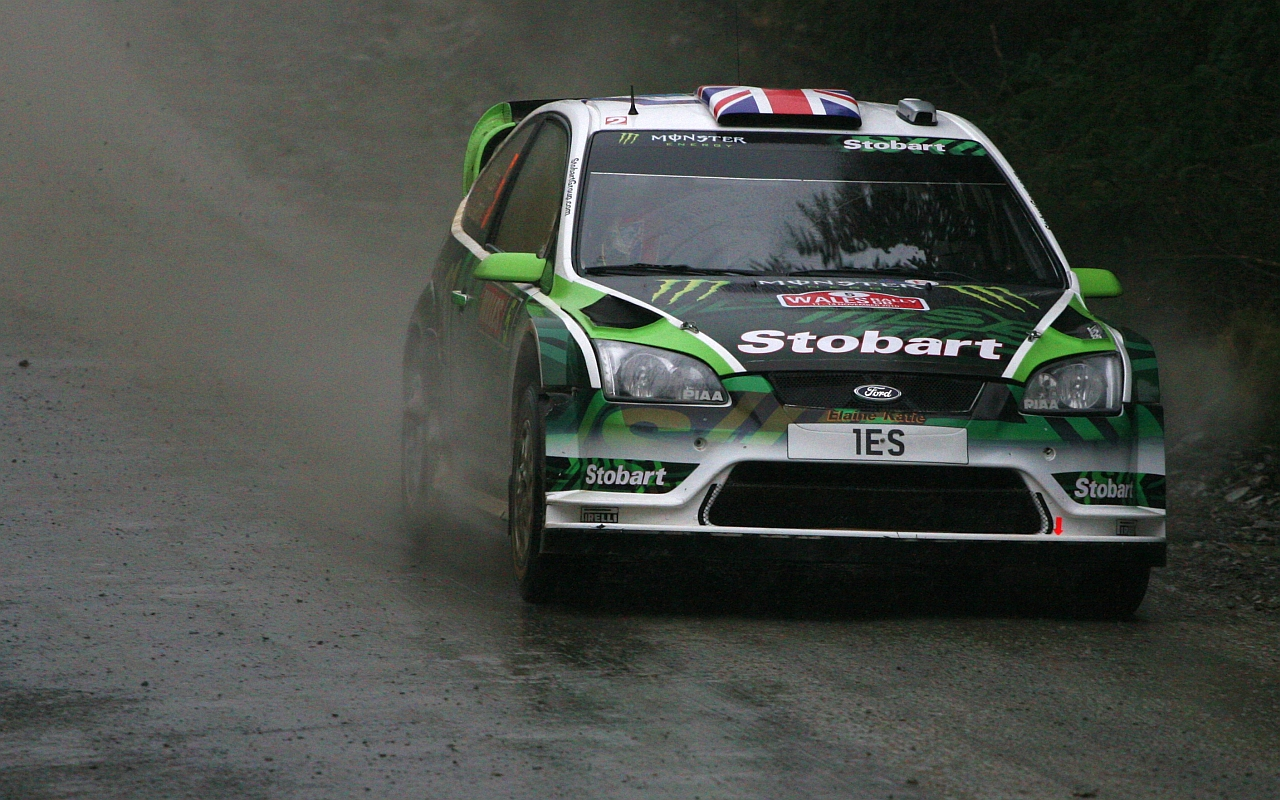
- Changeable weather can bring rain and fog to the rally.
- Host country: United Kingdom
- Rally base: Llandudno, Conwy
- Dates run: 3 – 6 October 2019
- Start location: Little Budworth, Cheshire
- Finish location: Denbigh Moors, Denbighshire
- Stages: 22 (312.75 km; 194.33 miles)
- Stage surface: Gravel
- Transport distance: 1,342.49 km (834.18 miles)
- Overall distance: 1,655.24 km (1,028.52 miles)

Statistics
- Crews registered: 59
- Crews: 52 at start, 47 at finish

Overall results
- Overall winner: (Estonia) Ott Tänak (Estonia) Martin Järveoja (Japan) Toyota Gazoo Racing WRT; 3:00:58.0
- Power Stage winner: (Estonia) Ott Tänak (Estonia) Martin Järveoja (Japan) Toyota Gazoo Racing WRT

Support category results
- WRC-2 winner: (Norway) Petter Solberg (United Kingdom) Phil Mills (Norway) Petter Solberg; 3:12:34.1
- J-WRC winner: (Spain) Jan Solans (Spain) Mauro Barreiro (Spain) Rally Team Spain; 3:30:05.0

The 2019 Wales Rally GB (also known as Wales Rally GB 2019) was a motor racing event for rally cars held over four days between 3 and 6 October 2019. It marked the seventy-fifth running of Wales Rally GB and was the twelfth round of the 2019 World Rally Championship, World Rally Championship-2 and the newly created WRC-2 Pro class. It was also the final round of the Junior World Rally Championship. The 2019 event was based in Llandudno in Conwy, and was contested over twenty-two special stages with a total a competitive distance of 312.75 km (194.33 mi).

Reigning World Drivers' and World Co-Drivers Champions Sébastien Ogier and Julien Ingrassia were the defending rally winners. M-Sport Ford WRT, the team they drove for in 2018, were the defending manufacturers' winners. The Finnish crew of Kalle Rovanperä and Jonne Halttunen were the defending rally winners in the World Rally Championship-2 category, but they did not defend their titles as they were scheduled to be promoted to the newly created WRC-2 Pro class.

Ott Tänak and Martin Järveoja won their first Wales Rally GB victory, extending their championship lead to a massive twenty-eight points. Their team, Toyota Gazoo Racing WRT, were the manufacturers' winners. The Škoda Motorsport crew of Kalle Rovanperä and Jonne Halttunen secured the first WRC-2 Pro title by winning the category, finishing first in the combined WRC-2 category. 2003 World Rally Champions Petter Solberg and Phil Mills bid farewell to WRC by winning the WRC-2 class. The Rally Team Spain crew of Jan Solans and Mauro Barreiro won the final round of the J-WRC championship and became the champions of 2019 Junior World Rally Championship.

== Background ==
=== Championship standings prior to the event ===
Ott Tänak and Martin Järveoja led both the drivers' and co-drivers' championships with a seventeen-point lead ahead of defending world champions Sébastien Ogier and Julien Ingrassia. Thierry Neuville and Nicolas Gilsoul were third, a further thirteen points behind. In the World Rally Championship for Manufacturers, Hyundai Shell Mobis WRT held a nineteen-point lead over Toyota Gazoo Racing WRT.

In the World Rally Championship-2 Pro standings, Kalle Rovanperä and Jonne Halttunen led by fifty-six points in the drivers' and co-drivers' standings respectively. Gus Greensmith and Elliott Edmondson tied with Mads Østberg and Torstein Eriksen in second. In the manufacturers' championship, Škoda Motorsport led M-Sport Ford WRT by thirty-seven points, with Citroën Total over a hundred points behind in third.

In the World Rally Championship-2 standings, Kajetan Kajetanowicz and Maciej Szczepaniak tied with Nikolay Gryazin and Yaroslav Fedorov in first, with Benito Guerra and Jaime Zapata were third, only four points separating the top three.

In the Junior-World Rally Championship standings, Tom Kristensson and Henrik Appelskog led Jan Solans and Mauro Barreiro by just a point in the drivers' and co-drivers' standings respectively, with Dennis Rådström and Johan Johansson thirty-three points further behind in third in their own standings. In the Nations' standings, Sweden were first, thirteen points cleared of Spain, with Germany forty points further behind in third.

=== Entry list ===
The following crews entered into the rally. The event opened to crews competing in the World Rally Championship, World Rally Championship-2, WRC-2 Pro and privateer entries not registered to score points in any championship. A total of fifty-nine entries were received, with eleven crews entered with World Rally Cars and twenty-one entered the World Rally Championship-2. Five crews were nominated to score points in the Pro class. A further eleven entries were received for the Junior World Rally Championship.

No.	Driver	Co-Driver	Entrant	Car	Tyre
World Rally Car entries
1	(France) Sébastien Ogier	(France) Julien Ingrassia	(France) Citroën Total WRT	Citroën C3 WRC	M
3	(Finland) Teemu Suninen	(Finland) Jarmo Lehtinen	(United Kingdom) M-Sport Ford WRT	Ford Fiesta WRC	M
4	(Finland) Esapekka Lappi	(Finland) Janne Ferm	(France) Citroën Total WRT	Citroën C3 WRC	M
5	(United Kingdom) Kris Meeke	(United Kingdom) Sebastian Marshall	(Japan) Toyota Gazoo Racing WRT	Toyota Yaris WRC	M
7	(Sweden) Pontus Tidemand	(Norway) Ola Fløene	(United Kingdom) M-Sport Ford WRT	Ford Fiesta WRC	M
8	(Estonia) Ott Tänak	(Estonia) Martin Järveoja	(Japan) Toyota Gazoo Racing WRT	Toyota Yaris WRC	M
10	(Finland) Jari-Matti Latvala	(Finland) Miikka Anttila	(Japan) Toyota Gazoo Racing WRT	Toyota Yaris WRC	M
11	(Belgium) Thierry Neuville	(Belgium) Nicolas Gilsoul	(South Korea) Hyundai Shell Mobis WRT	Hyundai i20 Coupe WRC	M
33	(United Kingdom) Elfyn Evans	(United Kingdom) Scott Martin	(United Kingdom) M-Sport Ford WRT	Ford Fiesta WRC	M
42	(Republic of Ireland) Craig Breen	(Republic of Ireland) Paul Nagle	(South Korea) Hyundai Shell Mobis WRT	Hyundai i20 Coupe WRC	M
89	(Norway) Andreas Mikkelsen	(Norway) Anders Jæger-Amland	(South Korea) Hyundai Shell Mobis WRT	Hyundai i20 Coupe WRC	M
World Rally Championship-2 Pro entries
21	(Finland) Kalle Rovanperä	(Finland) Jonne Halttunen	(Czech Republic) Škoda Motorsport	Škoda Fabia R5 Evo	M
22	(Norway) Mads Østberg	(Norway) Torstein Eriksen	(France) Citroën Total (Note: Entry run in conjunction with DG Sport.)	Citroën C3 R5	M
23	(United Kingdom) Gus Greensmith	(United Kingdom) Elliott Edmondson	(United Kingdom) M-Sport Ford WRT	Ford Fiesta R5 Mk. II	M
24	(Czech Republic) Jan Kopecký	(Czech Republic) Jan Hloušek	(Czech Republic) Škoda Motorsport	Škoda Fabia R5 Evo	M
25	(New Zealand) Hayden Paddon	(New Zealand) John Kennard	(United Kingdom) M-Sport Ford WRT	Ford Fiesta R5 Mk. II	M
World Rally Championship-2 entries
41	(Mexico) Benito Guerra	(Spain) Daniel Cué	(Mexico) Benito Guerra (Note: Entry operated by Race Seven.)	Škoda Fabia R5 Evo	M
43	(France) Pierre-Louis Loubet	(France) Vincent Landais	(France) Pierre-Louis Loubet (Note: Entry operated by Qatar 2C World Rally Team.)	Škoda Fabia R5 Evo	M
44	(Norway) Ole Christian Veiby	(Sweden) Jonas Andersson	(Norway) Ole Christian Veiby (Note: Entry operated by Volkswagen Dealerteam Bauhaus.)	Volkswagen Polo GTI R5	M
45	(Poland) Kajetan Kajetanowicz	(Poland) Maciej Szczepaniak	(Poland) Kajetan Kajetanowicz (Note: Entry operated by Lotos Dynamic Rally Team.)	Volkswagen Polo GTI R5	P
46	(Chile) Alberto Heller	(Argentina) José Díaz	(Chile) Alberto Heller	Ford Fiesta R5 Mk. II	M
47	(Italy) Fabio Andolfi	(Italy) Simone Scattolin	(Italy) Fabio Andolfi (Note: Entry operated by ACI Team Italia WRC.)	Škoda Fabia R5	P
49	(Bolivia) Marco Bulacia Wilkinson	(Argentina) Fabian Cretu	(Bolivia) Marco Bulacia Wilkinson (Note: Entry operated by VIALCO Racing.)	Škoda Fabia R5	M
50	(Brazil) Paulo Nobre	(Brazil) Gabriel Morales	(Brazil) Paulo Nobre (Note: Entry operated by Palmeirinha Rally.)	Škoda Fabia R5	P
51	(United Kingdom) Rhys Yates	(United Kingdom) James Morgan	(United Kingdom) Rhys Yates	Hyundai i20 R5	P
53	(France) Adrien Fourmaux	(Belgium) Renaud Jamoul	(France) Adrien Fourmaux (Note: Entry operated by Equipe du France FFSA.)	Ford Fiesta R5	M
54	(Sweden) Oliver Solberg	(United Kingdom) Aaron Johnston	(Sweden) Oliver Solberg (Note: Entry operated by Sports Racing Technologies.)	Volkswagen Polo GTI R5	P
55	(Norway) Petter Solberg	(United Kingdom) Phil Mills	(Norway) Petter Solberg	Volkswagen Polo GTI R5	P
56	(Belgium) Guillaume De Mevius	(Belgium) Martijn Wydaeghe	(Belgium) Guillaume De Mevius (Note: Entry operated by DG Sport.)	Citroën C3 R5	M
57	(India) Gaurav Gill	(Australia) Glenn Macneall	(India) Gaurav Gill	Ford Fiesta R5 Mk. II	M
Junior World Rally Championship entries
71	(Sweden) Tom Kristensson	(Sweden) Henrik Appelskog	(Sweden) Tom Kristensson	Ford Fiesta R2	P
72	(Spain) Jan Solans	(Spain) Mauro Barreiro	Rally Team Spain	Ford Fiesta R2	P
73	(Sweden) Dennis Rådström	(Sweden) Johan Johansson	(Sweden) Dennis Rådström	Ford Fiesta R2	P
74	(Estonia) Roland Poom	(Estonia) Ken Järveoja	(Estonia) Roland Poom	Ford Fiesta R2	P
75	(United Kingdom) Tom Williams	(United Kingdom) Phil Hall	(United Kingdom) Tom Williams	Ford Fiesta R2	P
76	(Italy) Enrico Oldrati	(Italy) Elia De Guio	(Italy) Enrico Oldrati	Ford Fiesta R2	P
77	(United States) Sean Johnston	(United States) Alex Kihurani	(United States) Sean Johnston	Ford Fiesta R2	P
78	(Paraguay) Fabrizio Zaldivar	(Argentina) Fernando Mussano	(Paraguay) Fabrizio Zaldivar	Ford Fiesta R2	P
79	(Germany) Nico Knacker	(Germany) Michael Wenzel	(Germany) ADAC Weser-Ems	Ford Fiesta R2	P
80	(United States) Ryan Booth	(Australia) Rhianon Smyth-Gelsomino	(United States) Ryan Booth	Ford Fiesta R2	P
81	(United States) Keanna Erickson-Chang	(Republic of Ireland) Niall Burns	(United States) Keanna Erickson-Chang	Ford Fiesta R2	P
Other Major Entries
91	(Russia) Nikolay Gryazin	(Russia) Yaroslav Fedorov	(Russia) Nikolay Gryazin	Škoda Fabia R5	M
92	(Japan) Takamoto Katsuta	(United Kingdom) Daniel Barritt	(Japan) Takamoto Katsuta (Note: Entry operated by Tommi Mäkinen Racing.)	Ford Fiesta R5 Mk. II	P
94	(United Kingdom) Tom Cave	(United Kingdom) Dale Furniss	(United Kingdom) Tom Cave	Hyundai i20 R5	P
105	(United Kingdom) Louise Cook	(United Kingdom) Stefan Davis	(United Kingdom) Louise Cook	Ford Fiesta R2	P

=== Route ===
The heart of Llandudno on the coast of north Wales served as the rally base for Wales Rally GB this year, with a purpose-built special stage at the Oulton Park circuit as the opening stage of the rally on Thursday evening.

==== Itinerary ====
All dates and times are BST (UTC+1).

Date	Time	No.	Stage name	Distance
3 October	9:00	—	Gwydir [Shakedown]	4.68 km
Leg 1 — 121.83 km
3 October	19:08	SS1	Oulton Park	3.58 km
4 October	7:17	SS2	Elsi 1	11.65 km
4 October	7:45	SS3	Penmachno 1	16.95 km
4 October	9:57	SS4	Dyfnant 1	19.36 km
4 October	10:55	SS5	Aberhirnant 1	10.26 km
4 October	14:39	SS6	Elsi 2	11.65 km
4 October	15:07	SS7	Penmachno 2	16.95 km
4 October	15:57	SS8	Slate Mountain	1.60 km
4 October	18:11	SS9	Dyfnant 2	19.36 km
4 October	19:09	SS10	Aberhirnant 2	10.26 km
Leg 2 — 152.50 km
5 October	8:08	SS11	Dyfi 1	25.86 km
5 October	10:08	SS12	Myherin 1	23.54 km
5 October	11:02	SS13	Sweet Lamb Hafren 1	25.65 km
5 October	14:08	SS14	Myherin 2	23.54 km
5 October	15:02	SS15	Sweet Lamb Hafren 2	25.65 km
5 October	16:22	SS16	Dyfi 2	25.86 km
5 October	19:11	SS17	Colwyn Bay	2.40 km
Leg 3 — 38.42 km
6 October	7:34	SS18	Alwen 1	10.41 km
6 October	8:08	SS19	Brenig 1	6.43 km
6 October	9:26	SS20	Great Orme	4.74 km
6 October	11:06	SS21	Alwen 2	10.41 km
6 October	12:08	SS22	Brenig 2 [Power Stage]	6.43 km

== Report ==
=== World Rally Cars ===
The M-Sport Ford WRT crew of Elfyn Evans and Scott Martin returned to the championship after Evans injured his back during Rally Estonia. Ott Tänak started his rally with a near-10-second time loss because of an engine issue in the slippery opening stage, but he grabbed a narrow lead from teammate Kris Meeke going into Saturday after a day's effort. Esapekka Lappi retired from Friday after went off the road, while Jari-Matti Latvala retired from the rally after a heavy crash. Craig Breen rolled his i20 on Saturday morning, but it only cost cosmetic damage. Tänak won in style eventually.

==== Classification ====
Position		No.	Driver	Co-driver	Entrant	Car	Time	Difference	Points	
Event	Class	No.	Driver	Co-driver	Entrant	Car	Time	Difference	Event	Stage
1	1	8	Ott Tänak	Martin Järveoja	Toyota Gazoo Racing WRT	Toyota Yaris WRC	3:00:58.0	0.0	25	5
2	2	11	Thierry Neuville	Nicolas Gilsoul	Hyundai Shell Mobis WRT	Hyundai i20 Coupe WRC	3:01:08.9	+10.9	18	1
3	3	1	Sébastien Ogier	Julien Ingrassia	Citroën Total WRT	Citroën C3 WRC	3:01:21.8	+23.8	15	4
4	4	5	Kris Meeke	Sebastian Marshall	Toyota Gazoo Racing WRT	Toyota Yaris WRC	3:01:33.6	+35.6	12	0
5	5	7	Elfyn Evans	Scott Martin	M-Sport Ford WRT	Ford Fiesta WRC	3:01:46.6	+48.6	10	2
6	6	89	Andreas Mikkelsen	Anders Jæger-Amland	Hyundai Shell Mobis WRT	Hyundai i20 Coupe WRC	3:01:56.2	+58.2	8	0
7	7	7	Pontus Tidemand	Ola Fløene	M-Sport Ford WRT	Ford Fiesta WRC	3:06:21.8	+5:23.8	6	0
8	8	42	Craig Breen	Paul Nagle	Hyundai Shell Mobis WRT	Hyundai i20 Coupe WRC	3:10:23.0	+9:25.0	4	0
27	9	4	Esapekka Lappi	Janne Ferm	Citroën Total WRT	Citroën C3 WRC	3:36:51.7	+35:53.7	0	3
Retired SS18		3	Teemu Suninen	Jarmo Lehtinen	M-Sport Ford WRT	Ford Fiesta WRC	Mechanical		0	0
Retired SS7		10	Jari-Matti Latvala	Miikka Anttila	Toyota Gazoo Racing WRT	Toyota Yaris WRC	Crash		0	0

==== Special stages ====
Date	No.	Stage name	Distance	Winners	Car	Time	Class leaders
3 October	—	Gwydir [Shakedown]	4.68 km	Meeke / Marshall	Toyota Yaris WRC	2:54.1	—N/a
3 October	SS1	Oulton Park	3.58 km	Meeke / Marshall	Toyota Yaris WRC	2:47.4	Meeke / Marshall
4 October	SS2	Elsi 1	11.65 km	Evans / Martin	Ford Fiesta WRC	8:36.9	Meeke / Marshall
4 October	SS3	Penmachno 1	16.95 km	Tänak / Järveoja	Toyota Yaris WRC	9:43.0	Meeke / Marshall
4 October	SS4	Dyfnant 1	19.36 km	Tänak / Järveoja	Toyota Yaris WRC	11:06.9	Meeke / Marshall
4 October	SS5	Aberhirnant 1	10.26 km	Latvala / Anttila; Evans / Martin	Toyota Yaris WRC; Ford Fiesta WRC	5:37.4	Meeke / Marshall
4 October	SS6	Elsi 2	11.65 km	Ogier / Ingrassia	Citroën C3 WRC	8:32.4	Meeke / Marshall
4 October	SS7	Penmachno 2	16.95 km	Ogier / Ingrassia	Citroën C3 WRC	9:44.3	Meeke / Marshall
4 October	SS8	Slate Mountain	1.60 km	Neuville / Gilsoul	Hyundai i20 Coupe WRC	1:09.7	Meeke / Marshall
4 October	SS9	Dyfnant 2	19.36 km	Tänak / Järveoja	Toyota Yaris WRC	11:06.1	Meeke / Marshall
4 October	SS10	Aberhirnant 2	10.26 km	Tänak / Järveoja	Toyota Yaris WRC	5:39.8	Tänak / Järveoja
5 October	SS11	Dyfi 1	25.86 km	Evans / Martin	Ford Fiesta WRC	14:46.8	Tänak / Järveoja
5 October	SS12	Myherin 1	23.54 km	Evans / Martin	Ford Fiesta WRC	12:50.6	Tänak / Järveoja
5 October	SS13	Sweet Lamb Hafren 1	25.65 km	Evans / Martin	Ford Fiesta WRC	14:47.7	Tänak / Järveoja
5 October	SS14	Myherin 2	23.54 km	Neuville / Gilsoul	Hyundai i20 Coupe WRC	12:56.2	Tänak / Järveoja
5 October	SS15	Sweet Lamb Hafren 2	25.65 km	Mikkelsen / Jæger-Amland	Hyundai i20 Coupe WRC	14:59.7	Tänak / Järveoja
5 October	SS16	Dyfi 2	25.86 km	Neuville / Gilsoul	Hyundai i20 Coupe WRC	15:04.0	Tänak / Järveoja
5 October	SS17	Colwyn Bay	2.40 km	Tänak / Järveoja	Toyota Yaris WRC	1:51.6	Tänak / Järveoja
6 October	SS18	Alwen 1	10.41 km	Tänak / Järveoja	Toyota Yaris WRC	5:26.3	Tänak / Järveoja
6 October	SS19	Brenig 1	6.43 km	Evans / Martin	Ford Fiesta WRC	3:56.6	Tänak / Järveoja
6 October	SS20	Great Orme	4.74 km	Stage cancelled (Note: The stage was cancelled due to insufficient safety cover.)			
6 October	SS21	Alwen 2	10.41 km	Evans / Martin	Ford Fiesta WRC	5:29.3	Tänak / Järveoja
6 October	SS22	Brenig 2 [Power Stage]	6.43 km	Tänak / Järveoja	Toyota Yaris WRC	3:58.6	Tänak / Järveoja

==== Championship standings ====
Pos.	Drivers' championships			Co-drivers' championships			Manufacturers' championships		
Pos.	Move	Driver	Points	Move	Co-driver	Points	Move	Manufacturer	Points
1		Ott Tänak	240		Martin Järveoja	240		Hyundai Shell Mobis WRT	340
2		Sébastien Ogier	212		Julien Ingrassia	212		Toyota Gazoo Racing WRT	332
3		Thierry Neuville	199		Nicolas Gilsoul	199		Citroën Total WRT	278
4		Andreas Mikkelsen	102		Anders Jæger-Amland	102		M-Sport Ford WRT	200
5		Kris Meeke	98		Sebastian Marshall	98			

=== World Rally Championship-2 Pro ===
Kalle Rovanperä, who just celebrated his 19th birthday, led comfortably in the front until a puncture made his lead lost to his teammate Jan Kopecký. Mads Østberg and Hayden Paddon retired from Friday due to oil leak and car beached. In the second leg, Rovanperä regained the top spot from his teammate as Kopecký firstly punctured and then rolled his car. Hayden Paddon restarted on Saturday, but retired from the day again after he suffered two punctures. Gus Greensmith also retired from the day after hitting a bank and damaged his rear-right suspension. Rovanperä took the rally in the end to win the 2019 WRC-2 Pro championship.

==== Classification ====
Position		No.	Driver	Co-driver	Entrant	Car	Time	Difference	Points	
Event	Class	No.	Driver	Co-driver	Entrant	Car	Time	Difference	Class	Event
9	1	21	Kalle Rovanperä	Jonne Halttunen	Škoda Motorsport	Škoda Fabia R5 Evo	3:11:49.1	0.0	**25**	**2**
18	2	24	Jan Kopecký	Jan Hloušek	Škoda Motorsport	Škoda Fabia R5 Evo	3:16:36.1	+4:47.0	**18**	**0**
33	3	22	Gus Greensmith	Elliott Edmondson	M-Sport Ford WRT	Ford Fiesta R5 Mk. II	3:59:48.5	+47:59.4	**15**	**0**
38	4	25	Hayden Paddon	John Kennard	M-Sport Ford WRT	Ford Fiesta R5 Mk. II	4:12:03.6	+1:00:14.5	**12**	**0**
45	5	23	Mads Østberg	Torstein Eriksen	Citroën Total	Citroën C3 R5	4:35:58.9	+1:24:09.8	**10**	**0**

==== Special stages ====
Results in bold denote first in the RC2 class, the class which both the WRC-2 Pro and WRC-2 championships run to.

Date	No.	Stage name	Distance	Winners	Car	Time	Class leaders
3 October	—	Gwydir [Shakedown]	4.68 km	**Rovanperä / Halttunen**	Škoda Fabia R5 Evo	2:59.6	—N/a
3 October	SS1	Oulton Park	3.58 km	Rovanperä / Halttunen	Škoda Fabia R5 Evo	2:53.2	Rovanperä / Halttunen
4 October	SS2	Elsi 1	11.65 km	**Rovanperä / Halttunen**	Škoda Fabia R5 Evo	8:48.1	Rovanperä / Halttunen
4 October	SS3	Penmachno 1	16.95 km	**Greensmith / Edmondson**	Ford Fiesta R5 Mk. II	10:08.6	Rovanperä / Halttunen
4 October	SS4	Dyfnant 1	19.36 km	**Østberg / Eriksen**	Citroën C3 R5	11:32.5	Rovanperä / Halttunen
4 October	SS5	Aberhirnant 1	10.26 km	Stage interrupted (Note: The stage was interrupted because of spectators not following the marshals' instructions.)			
4 October	SS6	Elsi 2	11.65 km	**Rovanperä / Halttunen**	Škoda Fabia R5 Evo	8:48.1	Rovanperä / Halttunen
4 October	SS7	Penmachno 2	16.95 km	Stage interrupted (Note: The stage was interrupted by the accident of Jari-Matti Latvala and Miikka Anttila.)			
4 October	SS8	Slate Mountain	1.60 km	**Greensmith / Edmondson**	Ford Fiesta R5 Mk. II	1:13.0	Rovanperä / Halttunen
4 October	SS9	Dyfnant 2	19.36 km	**Kopecký / Hloušek**	Škoda Fabia R5 Evo	11:49.5	Kopecký / Hloušek
4 October	SS10	Aberhirnant 2	10.26 km	**Greensmith / Edmondson**	Ford Fiesta R5 Mk. II	6:05.4	Kopecký / Hloušek
5 October	SS11	Dyfi 1	25.86 km	Rovanperä / Halttunen	Škoda Fabia R5 Evo	15:42.4	Rovanperä / Halttunen
5 October	SS12	Myherin 1	23.54 km	Paddon / Kennard	Ford Fiesta R5 Mk. II	13:37.9	Rovanperä / Halttunen
5 October	SS13	Sweet Lamb Hafren 1	25.65 km	**Paddon / Kennard**	Ford Fiesta R5 Mk. II	15:49.2	Rovanperä / Halttunen
5 October	SS14	Myherin 2	23.54 km	**Rovanperä / Halttunen**	Škoda Fabia R5 Evo	13:36.7	Rovanperä / Halttunen
5 October	SS15	Sweet Lamb Hafren 2	25.65 km	**Rovanperä / Halttunen**	Škoda Fabia R5 Evo	15:53.5	Rovanperä / Halttunen
5 October	SS16	Dyfi 2	25.86 km	**Rovanperä / Halttunen**	Škoda Fabia R5 Evo	15:55.8	Rovanperä / Halttunen
5 October	SS17	Colwyn Bay	2.40 km	Kopecký / Hloušek	Škoda Fabia R5 Evo	1:58.8	Rovanperä / Halttunen
6 October	SS18	Alwen 1	10.41 km	**Paddon / Kennard**	Ford Fiesta R5 Mk. II	5:45.8	Rovanperä / Halttunen
6 October	SS19	Brenig 1	6.43 km	**Østberg / Eriksen**	Citroën C3 R5	4:09.5	Rovanperä / Halttunen
6 October	SS20	Great Orme	4.74 km	Stage cancelled			
6 October	SS21	Alwen 2	10.41 km	**Østberg / Eriksen**	Citroën C3 R5	5:43.2	Rovanperä / Halttunen
6 October	SS22	Brenig 2	6.43 km	Greensmith / Edmondson	Ford Fiesta R5 Mk. II	4:11.4	Rovanperä / Halttunen

==== Championship standings ====
- **Bold text** indicates 2019 World Champions.

Pos.	Drivers' championships			Co-drivers' championships			Manufacturers' championships		
Pos.	Move	Driver	Points	Move	Co-driver	Points	Move	Manufacturer	Points
1		**Kalle Rovanperä**	191		**Jonne Halttunen**	191		Škoda Motorsport	300
2		Gus Greensmith	125		Elliott Edmondson	125		M-Sport Ford WRT	247
3		Mads Østberg	120		Torstein Eriksen	120		Citroën Total	120
4		Jan Kopecký	97		Pavel Dresler	79			
5		Łukasz Pieniążek	74		Kamil Heller	62			

=== World Rally Championship-2 ===
Pierre-Louis Loubet led the class after a trouble-free run. Kajetan Kajetanowicz retired from Friday with three punctures, while Ole Christian Veiby retired from the first leg with a broken track control arm. Petter Solberg overtook Loubet to lead the category in the second loop of Saturday. His son Oliver Solberg made a sensational return after he exited his WRC debut due to steering issue on Friday, setting two fastest stage times until he stopped because of technical problems. Eventually, the 2003 World Champion won the class, ending his 20-year-long career in satisfactory.

==== Classification ====
Position		No.	Driver	Co-driver	Entrant	Car	Time	Difference	Points	
Event	Class	No.	Driver	Co-driver	Entrant	Car	Time	Difference	Class	Event
10	1	49	Petter Solberg	Phil Mills	Petter Solberg	Volkswagen Polo GTI R5	3:12:34.1	0.0	25	1
12	2	43	Pierre-Louis Loubet	Vincent Landais	Pierre-Louis Loubet	Škoda Fabia R5 Evo	3:12:52.9	+18.8	18	0
12	3	53	Adrien Fourmaux	Renaud Jamoul	Adrien Fourmaux	Ford Fiesta R5 Mk. II	3:15:24.7	+2:50.6	15	0
15	4	49	Marco Bulacia Wilkinson	Fabian Cretu	Marco Bulacia Wilkinson	Škoda Fabia R5	3:15:43.0	+3:08.9	12	0
17	5	47	Fabio Andolfi	Simone Scattolin	Fabio Andolfi	Škoda Fabia R5	3:16:27.0	+3:52.9	10	0
19	6	46	Alberto Heller	José Díaz	Alberto Heller	Ford Fiesta R5 Mk. II	3:16:59.2	+4:25.1	8	0
20	7	41	Benito Guerra	Daniel Cué	Benito Guerra	Škoda Fabia R5 Evo	3:17:23.1	+4:49.0	6	0
22	8	50	Paulo Nobre	Gabriel Morales	Paulo Nobre	Škoda Fabia R5	3:31:16.5	+18:42.4	4	0
24	9	56	Guillaume De Mevius	Martijn Wydaeghe	Guillaume De Mevius	Citroën C3 R5	3:33:26.2	+20:52.1	2	0
25	10	51	Alberto Heller	José Díaz	Alberto Heller	Ford Fiesta R5 Mk. II	3:33:56.5	+21:22.4	1	0
35	11	44	Ole Christian Veiby	Jonas Andersson	Ole Christian Veiby	Volkswagen Polo GTI R5	4:01:21.6	+48:47.5	0	0
42	12	41	Kajetan Kajetanowicz	Maciej Szczepaniak	Kajetan Kajetanowicz	Škoda Fabia R5	4:27:45.6	+1:15:11.5	0	0
Retired SS22		54	Oliver Solberg	Aaron Johnston	Oliver Solberg	Volkswagen Polo GTI R5	Accident		0	0

==== Special stages ====
Results in bold denote first in the RC2 class, the class which both the WRC-2 Pro and WRC-2 championships run to.

Date	No.	Stage name	Distance	Winners	Car	Time	Class leaders
3 October	—	Gwydir [Shakedown]	4.68 km	O. Solberg / Johnston	Volkswagen Polo GTI R5	3:00.2	—N/a
3 October	SS1	Oulton Park	3.58 km	**P. Solberg / Mills**	Volkswagen Polo GTI R5	2:50.7	P. Solberg / Mills
4 October	SS2	Elsi 1	11.65 km	Loubet / Landais	Škoda Fabia R5	8:57.9	Loubet / Landais
4 October	SS3	Penmachno 1	16.95 km	Veiby / Andersson	Volkswagen Polo GTI R5	10:17.1	Loubet / Landais
4 October	SS4	Dyfnant 1	19.36 km	Loubet / Landais	Škoda Fabia R5	11:51.3	Loubet / Landais
4 October	SS5	Aberhirnant 1	10.26 km	Stage interrupted			
4 October	SS6	Elsi 2	11.65 km	Loubet / Landais	Škoda Fabia R5	9:02.1	Loubet / Landais
4 October	SS7	Penmachno 2	16.95 km	Stage interrupted			
4 October	SS8	Slate Mountain	1.60 km	Fourmaux / Jamoul	Ford Fiesta R5	1:13.6	Loubet / Landais
4 October	SS9	Dyfnant 2	19.36 km	Loubet / Landais	Škoda Fabia R5	12:03.7	Loubet / Landais
4 October	SS10	Aberhirnant 2	10.26 km	P. Solberg / Mills	Volkswagen Polo GTI R5	6:15.1	Loubet / Landais
5 October	SS11	Dyfi 1	25.86 km	**O. Solberg / Johnston**	Volkswagen Polo GTI R5	15:33.3	Loubet / Landais
5 October	SS12	Myherin 1	23.54 km	**O. Solberg / Johnston**	Volkswagen Polo GTI R5	13:34.8	Loubet / Landais
5 October	SS13	Sweet Lamb Hafren 1	25.65 km	P. Solberg / Mills	Volkswagen Polo GTI R5	15:49.5	Loubet / Landais
5 October	SS14	Myherin 2	23.54 km	P. Solberg / Mills	Volkswagen Polo GTI R5	13:45.1	P. Solberg / Mills
5 October	SS15	Sweet Lamb Hafren 2	25.65 km	Loubet / Landais	Škoda Fabia R5	15:55.6	Loubet / Landais
5 October	SS16	Dyfi 2	25.86 km	P. Solberg / Mills	Volkswagen Polo GTI R5	15:59.1	P. Solberg / Mills
5 October	SS17	Colwyn Bay	2.40 km	**P. Solberg / Mills**	Volkswagen Polo GTI R5	1:56.1	P. Solberg / Mills
6 October	SS18	Alwen 1	10.41 km	O. Solberg / Johnston	Volkswagen Polo GTI R5	5:48.3	P. Solberg / Mills
6 October	SS19	Brenig 1	6.43 km	O. Solberg / Johnston	Volkswagen Polo GTI R5	4:12.0	P. Solberg / Mills
6 October	SS20	Great Orme	4.74 km	Stage cancelled			
6 October	SS21	Alwen 2	10.41 km	P. Solberg / Mills	Volkswagen Polo GTI R5	5:46.1	P. Solberg / Mills
6 October	SS22	Brenig 2	6.43 km	**Fourmaux / Jamoul**	Ford Fiesta R5	4:09.4	P. Solberg / Mills

==== Championship standings ====
Pos.	Drivers' championships			Co-drivers' championships		
Pos.	Move	Driver	Points	Move	Co-driver	Points
1	3	Pierre-Louis Loubet	81	3	Vincent Landais	81
2	1	Benito Guerra	75	1	Maciej Szczepaniak	73
3	2	Kajetan Kajetanowicz	73	1	Yaroslav Fedorov	73
4	2	Nikolay Gryazin	73	1	Jaime Zapata	69
5	1	Marco Bulacia Wilkinson	60	1	Fabian Cretu	60

=== Junior World Rally Championship ===
Jan Solans fended off championship leader Tom Kristensson, while Dennis Rådström went off the road and retired from Friday despite holding an early lead. On Saturday, Kristensson suffered a puncture and dropping over three minutes. Following title rival Kristensson's problem, Solans was clear in front. The Spaniard successfully sealed the win to snatch the junior title.

==== Classification ====
Position		No.	Driver	Co-driver	Entrant	Car	Time	Difference	Points	
Event	Class	No.	Driver	Co-driver	Entrant	Car	Time	Difference	Class	Stage
21	1	72	Jan Solans	Mauro Barreiro	Rally Team Spain	Ford Fiesta R2	3:30:05.0	0.0	50	7
23	2	71	Tom Kristensson	Henrik Appelskog	Tom Kristensson	Ford Fiesta R2	3:32:56.7	+2:51.7	36	2
26	3	77	Sean Johnston	Alex Kihurani	Sean Johnston	Ford Fiesta R5	3:35:16.9	+5:11.9	30	0
30	4	76	Enrico Oldrati	Elia De Guio	Enrico Oldrati	Ford Fiesta R2	3:50:41.7	+20:36.7	24	0
32	5	78	Fabrizio Zaldívar	Fernando Mussano	Fabrizio Zaldívar	Ford Fiesta R2	3:53:17.5	+23:12.5	20	0
34	6	80	Ryan Booth	Rhianon Smyth-Gelsomino	Ryan Booth	Ford Fiesta R2	3:58:17.7	+28:12.7	16	0
36	7	81	Keanna Erickson-Chang	Niall Burns	Keanna Erickson-Chang	Ford Fiesta R2	4:04:52.2	+34:47.2	12	0
40	8	75	Tom Williams	Phil Hall	Tom Williams	Ford Fiesta R2	4:21:18.6	+51:13.6	8	0
41	9	73	Dennis Rådström	Johan Johansson	Dennis Rådström	Ford Fiesta R2	4:24:16.0	+54:11.0	4	10
43	10	74	Roland Poom	Ken Järveoja	Roland Poom	Ford Fiesta R2	4:32:24.8	+1:02:19.8	2	0

==== Special stages ====
Date	No.	Stage name	Distance	Winners	Car	Time	Class leaders
3 October	—	Gwydir [Shakedown]	4.68 km	Rådström / Johansson	Ford Fiesta R2	3:29.4	—N/a
3 October	SS1	Oulton Park	3.58 km	Rådström / Johansson	Ford Fiesta R2	3:07.0	Rådström / Johansson
4 October	SS2	Elsi 1	11.65 km	Solans / Barreiro	Ford Fiesta R2	9:42.9	Rådström / Johansson
4 October	SS3	Penmachno 1	16.95 km	Solans / Barreiro	Ford Fiesta R2	11:24.1	Solans / Barreiro
4 October	SS4	Dyfnant 1	19.36 km	Kristensson / Appelskog	Ford Fiesta R2	12:45.7	Solans / Barreiro
4 October	SS5	Aberhirnant 1	10.26 km	Stage interrupted			
4 October	SS6	Elsi 2	11.65 km	Kristensson / Appelskog	Ford Fiesta R2	9:49.2	Kristensson / Appelskog
4 October	SS7	Penmachno 2	16.95 km	Stage interrupted			
4 October	SS8	Slate Mountain	1.60 km	Solans / Barreiro	Ford Fiesta R2	1:23.3	Kristensson / Appelskog
4 October	SS9	Dyfnant 2	19.36 km	Solans / Barreiro	Ford Fiesta R2	12:59.6	Solans / Barreiro
4 October	SS10	Aberhirnant 2	10.26 km	Solans / Barreiro	Ford Fiesta R2	6:40.0	Solans / Barreiro
5 October	SS11	Dyfi 1	25.86 km	Rådström / Johansson	Ford Fiesta R2	17:25.1	Solans / Barreiro
5 October	SS12	Myherin 1	23.54 km	Solans / Barreiro	Ford Fiesta R2	14:51.6	Solans / Barreiro
5 October	SS13	Sweet Lamb Hafren 1	25.65 km	Solans / Barreiro	Ford Fiesta R2	17:25.4	Solans / Barreiro
5 October	SS14	Myherin 2	23.54 km	Rådström / Johansson	Ford Fiesta R2	15:00.8	Solans / Barreiro
5 October	SS15	Sweet Lamb Hafren 2	25.65 km	Rådström / Johansson	Ford Fiesta R2	17:35.1	Solans / Barreiro
5 October	SS16	Dyfi 2	25.86 km	Rådström / Johansson	Ford Fiesta R2	17:35.4	Solans / Barreiro
5 October	SS17	Colwyn Bay	2.40 km	Rådström / Johansson	Ford Fiesta R2	2:08.4	Solans / Barreiro
6 October	SS18	Alwen 1	10.41 km	Rådström / Johansson	Ford Fiesta R2	6:32.8	Solans / Barreiro
6 October	SS19	Brenig 1	6.43 km	Rådström / Johansson	Ford Fiesta R2	4:37.8	Solans / Barreiro
6 October	SS20	Great Orme	4.74 km	Stage cancelled			
6 October	SS21	Alwen 2	10.41 km	Rådström / Johansson	Ford Fiesta R2	6:23.5	Solans / Barreiro
6 October	SS22	Brenig 2	6.43 km	Rådström / Johansson	Ford Fiesta R2	4:34.8	Solans / Barreiro

==== Championship standings ====
- **Bold text** indicates 2019 World Champions.

Pos.	Drivers' championships			Co-drivers' championships			Trophy for Nations		
Pos.	Move	Driver	Points	Move	Co-driver	Points	Move	Country	Points
1	1	**Jan Solans**	139	1	**Mauro Barreiro**	139		**Sweden**	104
2	1	Tom Kristensson	118	1	Henrik Appelskog	118		Spain	98
3		Dennis Rådström	75		Johan Johansson	75	1	Estonia	49
4	5	Sean Johnston	50	5	Alex Kihurani	50	1	Germany	43
5	1	Roland Poom	46	1	Ken Järveoja	46		Italy	38

== Notes ==
Previous rally: 2019 Rally Turkey	2019 FIA World Rally Championship	Next rally: 2019 Rally Catalunya
Previous rally: 2018 Wales Rally GB	2019 Wales Rally GB	Next rally: 2021 Wales Rally GB; 2020 edition cancelled
