= 2019 Junior WRC Championship =

The 2019 FIA Junior WRC Championship was the seventh season of Junior WRC, a rallying championship governed by the Fédération Internationale de l'Automobile, running in support of the World Rally Championship.

The championship was open to drivers under the age of thirty with no such restriction for co-drivers. Crews competed in identical one-litre Ford Fiesta R2s built and maintained by M-Sport. The championship was contested over five selected WRC rounds with the winning crew awarded a new Ford Fiesta R5 car, tyre package, free fuel and a registration to compete in the 2020 WRC3 Championship. (Note: The prize was originally presented as registration to compete in the 2020 WRC2 Championship; however, the FIA restructured the support categories in October 2019 and the WRC2 for privateers became known as WRC3 for 2020.)

Jan Solans and Mauro Barreiro won the drivers' and co-drivers' championships, beating Tom Kristensson and Henrik Appelskog by eighteen points. In the Trophy of Nations, Sweden beat Spain by six point to become the inaugural winners.

== Calendar ==
The final 2019 Junior WRC Championship calendar consisted of five events of the 2019 World Rally Championship.

Round	Dates		Rally	Rally headquarters	Rally details		
Round	Start	Finish	Rally	Rally headquarters	Surface	Stages	Distance
1	14 February	17 February	Rally Sweden	Torsby, Värmland	Snow	19	316.80 km
2	28 March	31 March	(France) Tour de Corse	Bastia, Haute-Corse	Tarmac	14	347.51 km
3	13 June	16 June	(Italy) Rally Italia Sardegna	Alghero, Sardinia	Gravel	19	313.44 km
4	1 August	4 August	Rally Finland	Jyväskylä, Keski-Suomi	Gravel	23	307.58 km
5	3 October	6 October	(United Kingdom) Wales Rally GB	Deeside, Flintshire	Gravel	22	312.75 km

=== Calendar changes ===
The 2019 calendar was heavily revised from the 2018 schedule. The championship dropped from six rounds to five. The Rallies of Portugal and Turkey were removed from the calendar, while events in Italy and Wales were added in their place.

=== Route changes ===
Organisers of the Tour de Corse announced plans for a new route, with up to three-quarters of the 2019 route being revised from the 2018 rally.

== Entries ==
The following crews were entered into the championship:

Entrant	Drivers	Co-drivers	Rounds
ADAC Sachsen	(Germany) Julius Tannert	(Germany) Helmar Hinneberg	1
ADAC Sachsen	(Germany) Julius Tannert	(Austria) Jürgen Heigl	2–4
ADAC Weiser-Ems	(Germany) Nico Knacker	(Germany) Tobias Braun	1
ADAC Weiser-Ems	(Germany) Nico Knacker	(Germany) Michael Wenzel	2, 4
ADAC Weiser-Ems	(Germany) Nico Knacker	(Germany) Anne Katharina Stein	3
Aleksi Röyhkiö	(Finland) Aleksi Röyhkiö	(Finland) Ville Mannisenmäki	4
Dennis Rådström	(Sweden) Dennis Rådström	(Sweden) Johan Johansson	All
Enrico Oldrati	(Italy) Enrico Oldrati	(Italy) Elia De Guio	All
Fabrizio Zaldívar	(Paraguay) Fabrizio Zaldívar	(Argentina) Fernando Mussano	All
OT Racing	(Estonia) Ken Torn	(Estonia) Kuldar Sikk	1
OT Racing	(Estonia) Ken Torn	(Estonia) Kauri Pannas	2
Keanna Erickson-Chang	(United States) Keanna Erickson-Chang	(Republic of Ireland) Martin Brady	5
Rally Team Spain	(Spain) Jan Solans	(Spain) Mauro Barreiro	All
LMT Autosporta Akadēmija	(Latvia) Mārtiņš Sesks	(Latvia) Krišjānis Caune	1–4
Raul Badiu	(Romania) Raul Badiu	(Romania) Gabriel Lazăr	1–4
Roland Poom	(Estonia) Roland Poom	(Estonia) Ken Järveoja	1–2, 4–5
Ryan Booth	(United States) Ryan Booth	(Australia) Rhianon Smyth-Gelsomino	5
Sean Johnston	(United States) Sean Johnston	(United States) Alex Kihurani	All
Team Flying Finn	(Finland) Sami Pajari	(Finland) Antti Haapala	4
Tom Kristensson	(Sweden) Tom Kristensson	(Sweden) Henrik Appelskog	All
Tom Williams	(United Kingdom) Tom Williams	(United Kingdom) Phil Hall	All

== Changes ==
All teams competed with an identical car built by M-Sport. The team announced that a new model of Ford Fiesta was introduced for 2019, one that was still built to R2 specifications, but featured a new engine and drivetrain. The new engine package was capable of producing 149 kW (199.8 bhp) of power, up from the 127 kW (170.3 bhp) produced by the engine used in 2018.

Crews were no longer eligible to score points in WRC3 as the series was discontinued in 2019.

== Results and standings ==
=== Season summary ===
Round	Event	Winning driver	Winning co-driver	Nations' winner	Winning time	Report
1	Rally Sweden	(Sweden) Tom Kristensson	(Sweden) Henrik Appelskog	Sweden	3:14:48.9	Report
2	(France) Tour de Corse	(Germany) Julius Tannert	(Austria) Jürgen Heigl	Germany	3:52:10.0	Report
3	(Italy) Rally Italia Sardegna	(Spain) Jan Solans	(Spain) Mauro Barreiro	Spain	4:02:36.2	Report
4	Rally Finland	(Sweden) Tom Kristensson	(Sweden) Henrik Appelskog	Sweden	2:55:17.2	Report
5	(United Kingdom) Wales Rally GB	(Spain) Jan Solans	(Spain) Mauro Barreiro	Spain	3:30:05.0	Report

=== Scoring system ===
Points are awarded to the top ten classified finishers. An additional point is given for every stage win. The best 4 classification results count towards the drivers’ and co-drivers’ totals, but stage points from all 5 rounds can be retained. Classification points for the last event are doubled for the drivers’ and co-drivers’ championship, but only if they have started at least 3 of the previous Junior WRC rounds. For the FIA Junior WRC Trophy of Nations, only the highest-placed driver from each event received points for their nation.

Position	1st	2nd	3rd	4th	5th	6th	7th	8th	9th	10th
Points	25	18	15	12	10	8	6	4	2	1

=== FIA Junior WRC Championship for Drivers ===
Pos.	Driver	SWE (Sweden)	FRA (France)	ITA (Italy)	FIN (Finland)	GBR (United Kingdom)	Drops	Points
1	(Spain) Jan Solans	3^{1}	4^{6}	1^{12}	2^{5}	1^{7}	12	139
2	(Sweden) Tom Kristensson	1^{1}	2^{3}	3	1^{8}	2^{2}	15	118
3	(Sweden) Dennis Rådström	8^{12}	3^{1}	2^{6}	Ret^{5}	9^{10}	0	75
4	(United States) Sean Johnston	5	Ret	Ret	5	3	0	50
5	(Estonia) Roland Poom	2	6		3	10	0	43
6	(Italy) Enrico Oldrati	7	8	8	6	4	4	42
7	(Germany) Julius Tannert	11	1^{3}	6	Ret^{1}		0	37
8	(Paraguay) Fabrizio Zaldívar	9	10	7	8	5	1	32
9	(United Kingdom) Tom Williams	4	5	Ret	10	8	0	31
10	(Latvia) Mārtiņš Sesks	6^{3}	Ret	5	9^{2}		0	25
11	(Romania) Raul Badiu	13	7	4	Ret		0	18
12	(Finland) Aleksi Röyhkiö				4		0	12
13	(Germany) Nico Knacker	12	9	9	7		0	10
14	(United States) Ryan Booth					6	0	8
15	(United States) Keanna Erickson-Chang					7	0	6
16	(Estonia) Ken Torn	10^{2}	Ret				0	3
17	(Finland) Sami Pajari				Ret^{2}		0	2
Pos.	Driver	SWE (Sweden)	FRA (France)	ITA (Italy)	FIN (Finland)	GBR (United Kingdom)	Drops	Points

Key
Colour	Result
Gold	Winner
Silver	2nd place
Bronze	3rd place
Green	Points finish
Blue	Non-points finish
Blue	Non-classified finish (NC)
Purple	Did not finish (Ret)
Black	Excluded (EX)
Black	Disqualified (DSQ)
White	Did not start (DNS)
White	Cancelled (C)
Blank	Withdrew entry from the event (WD)

=== FIA Junior WRC Championship for Co-Drivers ===
Pos.	Co-Driver	SWE (Sweden)	FRA (France)	ITA (Italy)	FIN (Finland)	GBR (United Kingdom)	Drops	Points
1	(Spain) Mauro Barreiro	3^{1}	4^{6}	1^{12}	2^{5}	1^{7}	12	139
2	(Sweden) Henrik Appelskog	1^{1}	2^{3}	3	1^{8}	2^{2}	15	118
3	(Sweden) Johan Johansson	8^{12}	3^{1}	2^{6}	Ret^{5}	9^{10}	0	75
4	(United States) Alex Kihurani	5	Ret	Ret	5	3	0	50
5	(Estonia) Ken Järveoja	2	6		3	10	0	43
6	(Italy) Elia De Guio	7	8	8	6	4	4	42
7	(Austria) Jürgen Heigl		1^{3}	6	Ret^{1}		0	37
8	(Argentina) Fernando Mussano	9	10	7	8	5	1	32
9	(United Kingdom) Phil Hall	4	5	Ret	10	8	0	31
10	(Latvia) Krišjānis Caune	6^{3}	Ret	5	9^{2}		0	21
11	(Romania) Gabriel Lazăr	13	7	4	Ret		0	18
12	(Finland) Ville Mannisenmäki				4		0	12
13	(Australia) Rhianon Smyth-Gelsomino					6	0	8
14	(Germany) Michael Wenzel		9		7		0	8
15	(Republic of Ireland) Martin Brady					7	0	6
16	(Latvia) Krišjānis Caune				9^{2}		0	4
17	(Estonia) Kuldar Sikk	10^{2}					0	3
17	(Germany) Anne Katharina Stein			9			0	2
18	(Finland) Antti Haapala				Ret^{2}		0	2
Pos.	Co-Driver	SWE (Sweden)	FRA (France)	ITA (Italy)	FIN (Finland)	GBR (United Kingdom)	Drops	Points

Key
Colour	Result
Gold	Winner
Silver	2nd place
Bronze	3rd place
Green	Points finish
Blue	Non-points finish
Blue	Non-classified finish (NC)
Purple	Did not finish (Ret)
Black	Excluded (EX)
Black	Disqualified (DSQ)
White	Did not start (DNS)
White	Cancelled (C)
Blank	Withdrew entry from the event (WD)

=== FIA Junior WRC Championship Trophy for Nations ===
Pos.	Nation	SWE (Sweden)	FRA (France)	ITA (Italy)	FIN (Finland)	GBR (United Kingdom)	Points
1	Sweden	1	2	2	1	2	104
2	Spain	3	3	1	2	1	98
3	Estonia	2	5		3	7	49
4	Germany	9	1	5	7		43
5	Italy	7	7	7	6	4	38
6	United States	5	Ret	Ret	5	3	35
7	United Kingdom	4	4		10	6	33
8	Paraguay	8	8	6	8	5	30
9	Romania	10	6	3	Ret		24
10	Latvia	6	Ret	4	9		22
11	Finland				4		12
Pos.	Nation	SWE (Sweden)	FRA (France)	ITA (Italy)	FIN (Finland)	GBR (United Kingdom)	Points

Key
Colour	Result
Gold	Winner
Silver	2nd place
Bronze	3rd place
Green	Points finish
Blue	Non-points finish
Blue	Non-classified finish (NC)
Purple	Did not finish (Ret)
Black	Excluded (EX)
Black	Disqualified (DSQ)
White	Did not start (DNS)
White	Cancelled (C)
Blank	Withdrew entry from the event (WD)
