= 2019 Tour de Corse =

62nd edition of Rally Corsica

2019 Tour de Corse 62^{e} Corsica Linea – Tour de Corse
Round 4 of 14 in the 2019 World Rally Championship
← Previous event	Next event →
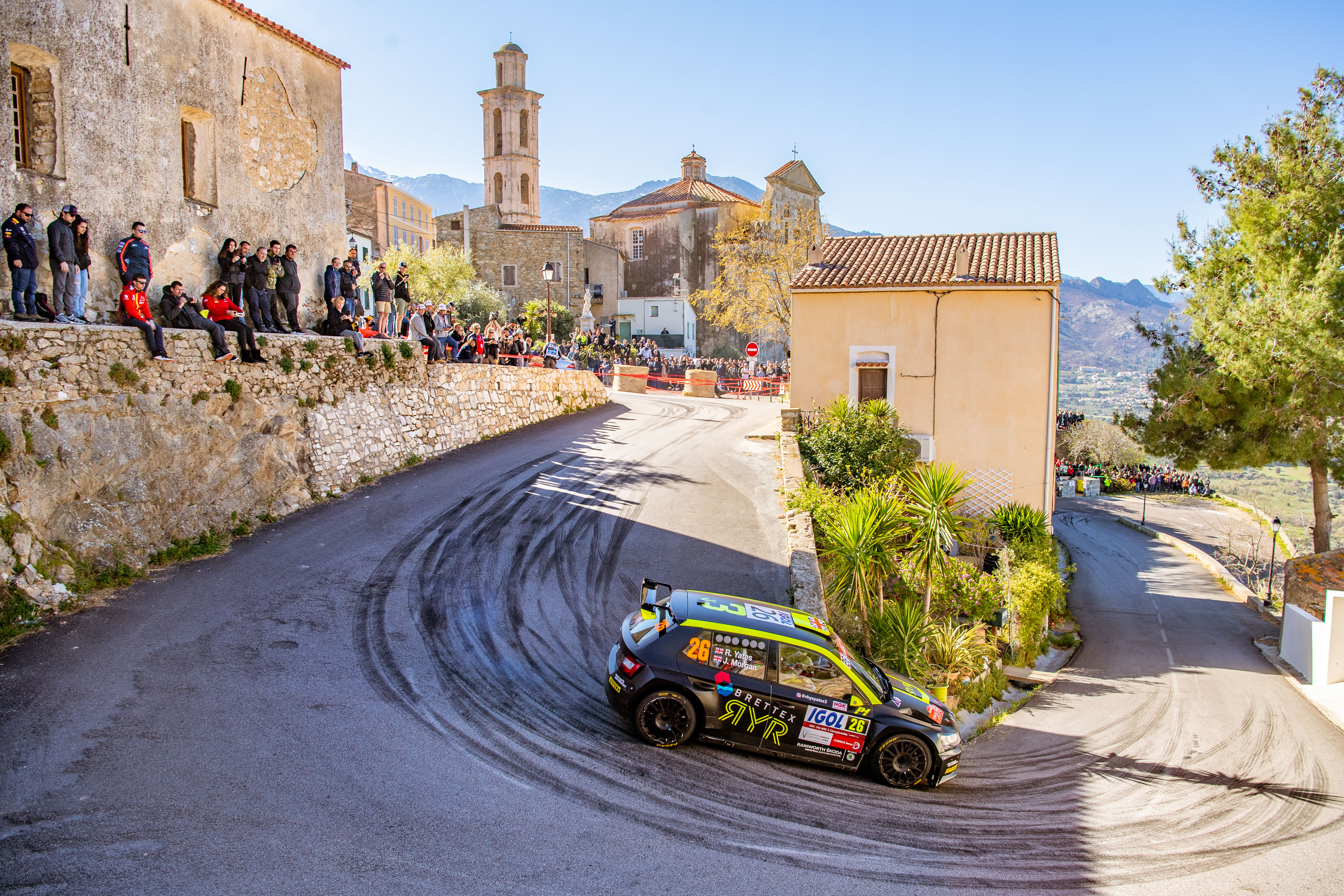
- The Tour de Corse is the first full tarmac event on the 2019 calendar.
- Host country: France
- Rally base: Bastia, Corsica
- Dates run: 28 – 31 March 2019
- Start location: Alta-Rocca, Corse-du-Sud
- Finish location: Calvi, Haute-Corse
- Stages: 14 (347.51 km; 215.93 miles)
- Stage surface: Tarmac
- Transport distance: 846.55 km (526.02 miles)
- Overall distance: 1,194.06 km (741.95 miles)

Statistics
- Crews registered: 96
- Crews: 92 at start, 68 at finish

Overall results
- Overall winner: (Belgium) Thierry Neuville (Belgium) Nicolas Gilsoul (South Korea) Hyundai Shell Mobis WRT; 3:22:59.0
- Power Stage winner: (United Kingdom) Kris Meeke (United Kingdom) Sebastian Marshall (Japan) Toyota Gazoo Racing WRT

Support category results
- WRC-2 winner: (Italy) Fabio Andolfi (Italy) Simone Scattolin (Italy) Fabio Andolfi; 3:34:28.6
- J-WRC winner: (Germany) Julius Tannert (Austria) Jürgen Heigl (Germany) ADAC Sachsen; 3:52:10.0

The 2019 Tour de Corse (also known as the Corsica Linea – Tour de Corse 2019) was a motor racing event for rally cars that was held over four days between 28 and 31 March 2019. It marked the sixty-second running of Tour de Corse and was the fourth round of the 2019 World Rally Championship, World Rally Championship-2 and the newly created WRC-2 Pro class. It was also the second round of the Junior World Rally Championship. The 2019 event was based in the town of Bastia in Corsica, and was contested over fourteen special stages with a total a competitive distance of 347.51 km (215.93 mi).

Reigning World Drivers' and World Co-Drivers' Champions Sébastien Ogier and Julien Ingrassia were the defending rally winners. M-Sport Ford WRT, the team they drove for in 2018, were the defending manufacturers' winners. Jan Kopecký and Pavel Dresler were the defending winners in the World Rally Championship-2 category, but they did not participate in the event. Jean-Baptiste Franceschi and Romain Courbon were the reigning World Rally Championship-3 and defending Junior World Rally Championship winners, but did not defend their titles as they did not take part in the rally.

Thierry Neuville and Nicolas Gilsoul won the Rally Corsica for the second time in their career. Their team, Hyundai Shell Mobis WRT, were the manufacturers' winners. The M-Sport Ford WRT crew of Łukasz Pieniążek and Kamil Heller won the WRC-2 Pro category, while the Italian crew of Fabio Andolfi and Simone Scattolin won the wider WRC-2 class, finishing first in the combined WRC-2 category. The second round of the J-WRC championship was taken by the ADAC Sachsen crew of Julius Tannert and Jürgen Heigl.

== Background ==
=== Championship standings prior to the event ===
Ott Tänak and Martin Järveoja led both the drivers' and co-drivers' championships with a four-point ahead of six-time world champions Sébastien Ogier and Julien Ingrassia. Thierry Neuville and Nicolas Gilsoul were third, a further six points behind. In the World Rally Championship for Manufacturers, defending manufacturers' champions Toyota Gazoo Racing WRT held an eight-point lead over Citroën Total WRT.

In the World Rally Championship-2 Pro standings, Gus Greensmith and Elliott Edmondson held a three-point lead ahead of Łukasz Pieniążek and Kamil Heller in the drivers' and co-drivers' standings respectively. Kalle Rovanperä and Jonne Halttunen were third, one point further back. In the manufacturers' championship, M-Sport Ford WRT led Škoda Motorsport by forty-one points, with eleven-point-behind Citroën Total in third.

In the World Rally Championship-2 standings, Ole Christian Veiby and Jonas Andersson led the drivers' and co-drivers' standings by fifteen points respectively. Yoann Bonato and Benjamin Boulloud crew and Benito Guerra and Jaime Zapata crew shared second.

In the Junior-World Rally Championship standings, Tom Kristensson and Henrik Appelskog led Roland Poom and Ken Järveoja by eight points in the drivers' and co-drivers' standings respectively, with Jan Solans and Mauro Barreiro two points further behind in third in their own standings. In the Nations' standings, Sweden were first, eight points cleared of Estonia, with Spain three points further behind in third.

=== Entry list ===
The following crews were entered into the rally. The event was open to crews competing in the World Rally Championship, World Rally Championship-2 and WRC-2 Pro, the FIA R-GT Cup, the Junior World Rally Championship, and privateer entries not registered to score points in any championship. Ninety-six crews were registered to compete, including ten competing with World Rally Cars and eighteen in World Rally Championship-2. Two of these crews are nominate to score points in the WRC-2 Pro class. A further thirteen entries were received for the Junior World Rally Championship. The total of ninety-six crews made for the largest entry list for a World Rally Championship event since the 2015 edition of the Tour de Corse, when a total of 123 crews were registered to the event.

No.	Driver	Co-Driver	Entrant	Car	Tyre
World Rally Car entries
1	(France) Sébastien Ogier	(France) Julien Ingrassia	(France) Citroën Total WRT	Citroën C3 WRC	M
3	(Finland) Teemu Suninen	(Finland) Marko Salminen	(United Kingdom) M-Sport Ford WRT	Ford Fiesta WRC	M
4	(Finland) Esapekka Lappi	(Finland) Janne Ferm	(France) Citroën Total WRT	Citroën C3 WRC	M
5	(United Kingdom) Kris Meeke	(United Kingdom) Sebastian Marshall	(Japan) Toyota Gazoo Racing WRT	Toyota Yaris WRC	M
6	(Spain) Dani Sordo	(Spain) Carlos del Barrio	(South Korea) Hyundai Shell Mobis WRT	Hyundai i20 Coupe WRC	M
8	(Estonia) Ott Tänak	(Estonia) Martin Järveoja	(Japan) Toyota Gazoo Racing WRT	Toyota Yaris WRC	M
10	(Finland) Jari-Matti Latvala	(Finland) Miikka Anttila	(Japan) Toyota Gazoo Racing WRT	Toyota Yaris WRC	M
11	(Belgium) Thierry Neuville	(Belgium) Nicolas Gilsoul	(South Korea) Hyundai Shell Mobis WRT	Hyundai i20 Coupe WRC	M
19	(France) Sébastien Loeb	(Monaco) Daniel Elena	(South Korea) Hyundai Shell Mobis WRT	Hyundai i20 Coupe WRC	M
33	(United Kingdom) Elfyn Evans	(United Kingdom) Scott Martin	(United Kingdom) M-Sport Ford WRT	Ford Fiesta WRC	M
World Rally Championship-2 Pro entries
21	(Finland) Kalle Rovanperä	(Finland) Jonne Halttunen	(Czech Republic) Škoda Motorsport (Note: Entry run in conjunction with HK Racing.)	Škoda Fabia R5	M
22	(Poland) Łukasz Pieniążek	(Poland) Kamil Heller	(United Kingdom) M-Sport Ford WRT	Ford Fiesta R5	M
World Rally Championship-2 entries
23	(Norway) Ole Christian Veiby	(Sweden) Jonas Andersson	(Norway) Ole Christian Veiby (Note: Entry operated by Volkswagen Dealerteam BAUHAUS.)	Volkswagen Polo GTI R5	M
24	(France) Yoann Bonato	(France) Benjamin Boulloud	(France) Yoann Bonato (Note: Entry operated by CHL Sport Auto.)	Citroën C3 R5	M
25	(France) Adrien Fourmaux	(Belgium) Renaud Jamoul	(France) Adrien Fourmaux (Note: Entry operated by Equipe de France FFSA.)	Ford Fiesta R5	M
26	(United Kingdom) Rhys Yates	(United Kingdom) James Morgan	(United Kingdom) Rhys Yates	Škoda Fabia R5	P
27	(France) Nicolas Ciamin	(France) Yannick Roche	(France) Nicolas Ciamin (Note: Entry operated by Oreca and THX Racing.)	Volkswagen Polo GTI R5	M
28	(Russia) Nikolay Gryazin	(Russia) Yaroslav Fedorov	(Russia) Nikolay Gryazin (Note: Entry operated by Sports Racing Technologies.)	Škoda Fabia R5	M
29	(Belgium) Guillaume De Mevius	(Belgium) Martijn Wydaeghe	(Belgium) Guillaume De Mevius (Note: Entry operated by DG Sport.)	Citroën C3 R5	M
30	(Italy) "Pedro" (Note: Pseudonym of Massimo Pedretti.)	(Italy) Emanuele Baldaccini	(Italy) "Pedro"	Ford Fiesta R5	P
31	(Japan) Takamoto Katsuta	(United Kingdom) Daniel Barritt	(Japan) Takamoto Katsuta (Note: Entry operated by Tommi Mäkinen Racing.)	Ford Fiesta R5	P
32	(France) Eric Camilli	(France) Francios-Xavier Buresi	(France) Eric Camilli	Volkswagen Polo GTI R5	M
34	(France) Pierre-Louis Loubet	(France) Vincent Landais	(France) Pierre-Louis Loubet (Note: Entry operated by 2C Competition.)	Škoda Fabia R5	M
35	(Poland) Kajetan Kajetanowicz	(Poland) Maciej Szczepaniak	(Poland) Kajetan Kajetanowicz (Note: Entry operated by Lotos Dynamic Rally Team.)	Volkswagen Polo GTI R5	P
36	(Romania) Simone Tempestini	(Romania) Sergiu Itu	(Romania) Simone Tempestini (Note: Entry operated by Friulmotor Rally Team.)	Hyundai i20 R5	P
37	(Spain) Nil Solans	(Spain) Marc Martí	(Spain) Nil Solans (Note: Entry operated by Rally Team Spain.)	Ford Fiesta R5	P
38	(Italy) Fabio Andolfi	(Italy) Simone Scattolin	(Italy) Fabio Andolfi (Note: Entry operated by ACI Team Italia WRC.)	Škoda Fabia R5	P
39	(Belgium) Sebastien Bedoret	(Belgium) Thomas Walbrecq	(Belgium) Sebastien Bedoret (Note: Entry operated by SXM Competition.)	Škoda Fabia R5	P
Junior World Rally Championship entries
71	(Sweden) Tom Kristensson	(Sweden) Henrik Appelskog	(Sweden) Tom Kristensson	Ford Fiesta R2	P
72	(Estonia) Roland Poom	(Estonia) Ken Järveoja	(Estonia) Roland Poom	Ford Fiesta R2	P
73	(Spain) Jan Solans	(Spain) Mauro Barreiro	Rally Team Spain	Ford Fiesta R2	P
74	(Sweden) Dennis Rådström	(Sweden) Johan Johansson	(Sweden) Dennis Rådström	Ford Fiesta R2	P
75	(United Kingdom) Tom Williams	(United Kingdom) Phil Hall	(United Kingdom) Tom Williams	Ford Fiesta R2	P
76	(Latvia) Mārtiņš Sesks	(Latvia) Krišjānis Caune	(Latvia) LMT Autosporta Akadēmija	Ford Fiesta R2	P
77	(United States) Sean Johnston	(United States) Alex Kihurani	(United States) Sean Johnston	Ford Fiesta R2	P
78	(Italy) Enrico Oldrati	(Italy) Elia De Guio	(Italy) Enrico Oldrati	Ford Fiesta R2	P
79	(Estonia) Ken Torn	(Estonia) Kuldar Sikk	(Estonia) OT Racing	Ford Fiesta R2	P
80	(Paraguay) Fabrizio Zaldívar	(Argentina) Fernando Mussano	(Paraguay) Fabrizio Zaldívar	Ford Fiesta R2	P
81	(Germany) Julius Tannert	(Austria) Jürgen Heigl	(Germany) ADAC Sachsen	Ford Fiesta R2	P
82	(Germany) Nico Knacker	(Germany) Tobias Braun	(Germany) ADAC Weiser-Ems	Ford Fiesta R2	P
83	(Romania) Raul Baidu	(Romania) Gabriel Lazar	(Romania) Raul Baidu	Ford Fiesta R2	P
Other major entries
40	(France) Jean-Charles Beaubelique	(France) Julien Pesenti	(France) Jean-Charles Beaubelique	Citroën DS3 WRC	M
41	(France) Armando Pereira	(France) Rémi Tutélaire	(France) Armando Pereira	Ford Fiesta RS WRC	M
42	(France) Alain Vauthier	(France) Gilbert Dini	(France) Alain Vauthier	Ford Fiesta RS WRC	M
43	(France) Robert Simonetti	(France) Célia Simonetti	(France) Robert Simonetti	Citroën DS3 WRC	M

=== Route ===
The 2019 edition of Tour de Corse features a new route, with up to three-quarters of the route being revised from the 2018 edition.

==== Itinerary ====
All dates and times are CET (UTC+1) from 28 to 30 March 2019 and CEST (UTC+2) on 31 March 2019.

Date	Time	No.	Stage name	Distance
28 March	9:00	—	Sorbo Ocagnano [Shakedown]	5.39 km
Leg 1 — 121.82 km
29 March	8:29	SS1	Bavella 1	17.60 km
29 March	9:24	SS2	Valinco 1	25.94 km
29 March	10:32	SS3	Alta-Rocca 1	17.37 km
29 March	14:05	SS4	Bavella 2	17.60 km
29 March	15:00	SS5	Valinco 2	25.94 km
29 March	16:08	SS6	Alta-Rocca 2	17.37 km
Leg 2 — 174.50 km
30 March	7:38	SS7	Cap Corse 1	25.62 km
30 March	9:08	SS8	Désert des Agriates 1	14.45 km
30 March	10:14	SS9	Castagniccia 1	47.18 km
30 March	14:38	SS10	Cap Corse 2	25.62 km
30 March	16:08	SS11	Désert des Agriates 2	14.45 km
30 March	17:14	SS12	Castagniccia 2	47.18 km
Leg 3 — 51.19 km
31 March	9:45	SS13	Eaux de Zilia	31.85 km
31 March	12:18	SS14	Calvi [Power Stage]	19.34 km

== Report ==
=== World Rally Cars ===
The very first stage of the first pure tarmac rally of the season was dramatic. Kris Meeke suffered a puncture, while four-time winner Sébastien Loeb slid wide and damaged his suspension. Defending world champion Sébastien Ogier nosed his C3 into the bank and lost about ten seconds. In the afternoon loop, a stage drama happened between Meeke and rally leader Elfyn Evans. Evans caught up to Meeke and got stuck behind him, which saw Evans set a stage time eleven seconds slower than Meeke's Toyota teammate Ott Tänak. Evans dropped behind Thierry Neuville, who was 5.3 seconds behind Tänak, on the leaderboard. Eventually, the stewards decided to credit Evans with the same time as the Estonian, which restored him to first with an unchanged advantage after Leg 1.

Saturday appeared to be a disaster for the overnight leader Tänak, who also suffered a puncture and dropped down to sixth, which handled the lead back to Evans. But the Welshman's lead was short-lived as Neuville charged himself to the top spot in the final stage of the day with a-4.5-second lead. Despite Evans astonishingly fought back, an extremely unfortunate right-front puncture happened to the Welshman at where six kilometers from the finish line, which dropped him straightly down to third, over twenty seconds behind defending world champion Sébastien Ogier. Following Evans' puncture, Neuville snatched his first victory of the season.

==== Classification ====
Position		No.	Driver	Co-driver	Entrant	Car	Time	Difference	Points	
Event	Class	No.	Driver	Co-driver	Entrant	Car	Time	Difference	Event	Stage
1	1	11	Thierry Neuville	Nicolas Gilsoul	Hyundai Shell Mobis WRT	Hyundai i20 Coupe WRC	3:22:59.0	0.0	25	2
2	2	1	Sébastien Ogier	Julien Ingrassia	Citroën Total WRT	Citroën C3 WRC	3:23:39.3	+40.3	18	1
3	3	33	Elfyn Evans	Scott Martin	M-Sport Ford WRT	Ford Fiesta WRC	3:24:05.6	+1:06.6	15	0
4	4	6	Dani Sordo	Carlos del Barrio	Hyundai Shell Mobis WRT	Hyundai i20 Coupe WRC	3:24:17.4	+1:18.4	12	0
5	5	3	Teemu Suninen	Marko Salminen	M-Sport Ford WRT	Ford Fiesta WRC	3:24:23.6	+1:24.6	10	3
6	6	8	Ott Tänak	Martin Järveoja	Toyota Gazoo Racing WRT	Toyota Yaris WRC	3:24:39.0	+1:40.0	8	4
7	7	4	Esapekka Lappi	Janne Ferm	Citroën Total WRT	Citroën C3 WRC	3:25:08.1	+2:09.1	6	0
8	8	19	Sébastien Loeb	Daniel Elena	Hyundai Shell Mobis WRT	Hyundai i20 Coupe WRC	3:26:38.2	+3:39.2	4	0
9	9	5	Kris Meeke	Sebastian Marshall	Toyota Gazoo Racing WRT	Toyota Yaris WRC	3:28:05.3	+5:06.3	2	5
10	10	10	Jari-Matti Latvala	Miikka Anttila	Toyota Gazoo Racing WRT	Toyota Yaris WRC	3:29:43.6	+6:44.6	1	0

==== Special stages ====
Date	No.	Stage name	Distance	Winners	Car	Time	Class leaders
28 March	—	Sorbo Ocagnano [Shakedown]	5.39 km	Meeke / Marshall	Toyota Yaris WRC	3:46.7	—N/a
29 March	SS1	Bavella 1	17.60 km	Evans / Martin	Ford Fiesta WRC	10:20.6	Evans / Martin
29 March	SS2	Valinco 1	25.94 km	Meeke / Marshall	Toyota Yaris WRC	14:23.6	Tänak / Järveoja
29 March	SS3	Alta-Rocca 1	17.37 km	Tänak / Järveoja	Toyota Yaris WRC	10:05.2	Tänak / Järveoja
29 March	SS4	Bavella 2	17.60 km	Evans / Martin	Ford Fiesta WRC	10:17.5	Evans / Martin
29 March	SS5	Valinco 2	25.94 km	Evans / Martin	Ford Fiesta WRC	14:23.2	Evans / Martin
29 March	SS6	Alta-Rocca 2	17.37 km	Neuville / Gilsoul	Hyundai i20 Coupe WRC	10:02.3	Evans / Martin
30 March	SS7	Cap Corse 1	25.62 km	Tänak / Järveoja	Toyota Yaris WRC	15:50.6	Evans / Martin
30 March	SS8	Désert des Agriates 1	14.45 km	Tänak / Järveoja	Toyota Yaris WRC	7:55.8	Evans / Martin
30 March	SS9	Castagniccia 1	47.18 km	Sordo / del Barrio	Hyundai i20 Coupe WRC	29:45.0	Tänak / Järveoja
30 March	SS10	Cap Corse 2	25.62 km	Meeke / Marshall	Toyota Yaris WRC	15:52.3	Tänak / Järveoja
30 March	SS11	Désert des Agriates 2	14.45 km	Neuville / Gilsoul	Hyundai i20 Coupe WRC	7:57.6	Evans / Martin
30 March	SS12	Castagniccia 2	47.18 km	Neuville / Gilsoul	Hyundai i20 Coupe WRC	29:24.4	Neuville / Gilsoul
31 March	SS13	Eaux de Zilia	31.85 km	Evans / Martin	Ford Fiesta WRC	15:47.2	Evans / Martin
31 March	SS14	Calvi [Power Stage]	19.34 km	Meeke / Marshall	Toyota Yaris WRC	9:54.0	Neuville / Gilsoul

==== Championship standings ====
Pos.	Drivers' championships			Co-drivers' championships			Manufacturers' championships		
Pos.	Move	Driver	Points	Move	Co-driver	Points	Move	Manufacturer	Points
1	2	Thierry Neuville	82	2	Nicolas Gilsoul	82	2	Hyundai Shell Mobis WRT	114
2		Sébastien Ogier	80		Julien Ingrassia	80		Citroën Total WRT	102
3	2	Ott Tänak	77	2	Martin Järveoja	77	2	Toyota Gazoo Racing WRT	98
4	1	Elfyn Evans	43	1	Scott Martin	43		M-Sport Ford WRT	70
5	1	Kris Meeke	42	1	Sebastian Marshall	42			

=== World Rally Championship-2 Pro ===
Kalle Rovanperä led the WRC-2 Pro category as Łukasz Pieniążek suffered an early puncture. However, Rovanperä was forced to retire from the event as he crashed his Fabia out in SS9. In SS12, Pieniążek also retired from the day as he went off the road. But he managed to come back on the final day and took the win.

==== Classification ====
Position		No.	Driver	Co-driver	Entrant	Car	Time	Difference	Points	
Event	Class	No.	Driver	Co-driver	Entrant	Car	Time	Difference	Class	Event
25	1	22	Łukasz Pieniążek	Kamil Heller	M-Sport Ford WRT	Ford Fiesta R5	3:52:19.7	0.0	**25**	**0**
Retired SS9		37	Kalle Rovanperä	Jonne Halttunen	Škoda Motorsport	Škoda Fabia R5	Accident		**0**	**0**

==== Special stages ====
Results in bold denote first in the RC2 class, the class which both the WRC-2 Pro and WRC-2 championships run to.

Date	No.	Stage name	Distance	Winners	Car	Time	Class leaders
28 March	—	Sorbo Ocagnano [Shakedown]	5.39 km	Rovanperä / Halttunen	Škoda Fabia R5	3:57.4	—N/a
29 March	SS1	Bavella 1	17.60 km	Rovanperä / Halttunen	Škoda Fabia R5	10:58.0	Rovanperä / Halttunen
29 March	SS2	Valinco 1	25.94 km	Rovanperä / Halttunen	Škoda Fabia R5	15:24.8	Rovanperä / Halttunen
29 March	SS3	Alta-Rocca 1	17.37 km	Rovanperä / Halttunen	Škoda Fabia R5	10:43.5	Rovanperä / Halttunen
29 March	SS4	Bavella 2	17.60 km	Rovanperä / Halttunen	Škoda Fabia R5	10:53.0	Rovanperä / Halttunen
29 March	SS5	Valinco 2	25.94 km	Rovanperä / Halttunen	Škoda Fabia R5	15:12.1	Rovanperä / Halttunen
29 March	SS6	Alta-Rocca 2	17.37 km	Rovanperä / Halttunen	Škoda Fabia R5	10:35.6	Rovanperä / Halttunen
30 March	SS7	Cap Corse 1	25.62 km	Rovanperä / Halttunen	Škoda Fabia R5	16:42.1	Rovanperä / Halttunen
30 March	SS8	Désert des Agriates 1	14.45 km	Rovanperä / Halttunen	Škoda Fabia R5	8:23.7	Rovanperä / Halttunen
30 March	SS9	Castagniccia 1	47.18 km	Pieniążek / Heller	Ford Fiesta R5	32:23.7	Pieniążek / Heller
30 March	SS10	Cap Corse 2	25.62 km	Pieniążek / Heller	Ford Fiesta R5	17:17.9	Pieniążek / Heller
30 March	SS11	Désert des Agriates 2	14.45 km	Pieniążek / Heller	Ford Fiesta R5	9:44.9	Pieniążek / Heller
30 March	SS12	Castagniccia 2	47.18 km	No stage winner		—N/a	No leader (Note: Kalle Rovanperä and Jonne Halttunen crashed out in SS9, while Łukasz Pieniążek and Kamil Heller went off road in SS12. As a result, there was no stage winner or class leader of SS12.)
31 March	SS13	Eaux de Zilia	31.85 km	Pieniążek / Heller	Ford Fiesta R5	17:43.2	Pieniążek / Heller
31 March	SS14	Calvi	19.34 km	Pieniążek / Heller	Ford Fiesta R5	10:59.4	Pieniążek / Heller

==== Championship standings ====
Pos.	Drivers' championships			Co-drivers' championships			Manufacturers' championships		
Pos.	Move	Driver	Points	Move	Co-driver	Points	Move	Manufacturer	Points
1	1	Łukasz Pieniążek	62	1	Kamil Heller	62		M-Sport Ford WRT	102
2	1	Gus Greensmith	40	1	Elliott Edmondson	40		Škoda Motorsport	36
3		Kalle Rovanperä	36		Jonne Halttunen	36		Citroën Total	25
4		Mads Østberg	25		Torstein Eriksen	25			
5		Eerik Pietarinen	0		Juhana Raitanen	0			

=== World Rally Championship-2 ===
In the WRC-2 category, local driver Eric Camilli dominated the day in a Volkswagen Polo GTI R5 as he won all six stages. However, on Saturday, an early puncture dropped him behind Fabio Andolfi, who led the category after Yoann Bonato's retirement. Wore still, although he reduced the gap to just 5.4 seconds, he still forced to retire from the rally as his Polo was burnt out. Eventually, Fabio Andolfi won the category after he overcame a transmission issue.

==== Classification ====
Position		No.	Driver	Co-driver	Entrant	Car	Time	Difference	Points	
Event	Class	No.	Driver	Co-driver	Entrant	Car	Time	Difference	Class	Event
11	1	38	Fabio Andolfi	Simone Scattolin	Fabio Andolfi	Škoda Fabia R5	3:34:28.6	0.0	25	0
12	2	28	Nikolay Gryazin	Yaroslav Fedorov	Nikolay Gryazin	Škoda Fabia R5	3:34:32.5	+3.9	18	0
13	3	35	Kajetan Kajetanowicz	Maciej Szczepaniak	Kajetan Kajetanowicz	Volkswagen Polo GTI R5	3:37:21.9	+2:53.3	15	0
14	4	31	Takamoto Katsuta	Daniel Barritt	Takamoto Katsuta	Ford Fiesta R5	3:38:20.5	+3:51.9	12	0
15	5	26	Rhys Yates	James Morgan	Rhys Yates	Škoda Fabia R5	3:38:27.1	+3:58.5	10	0
17	6	39	Sebastien Bedoret	Thomas Walbrecq	Sebastien Bedoret	Škoda Fabia R5	3:43:31.5	+9:02.9	8	0
19	7	29	Guillaume De Mevius	Martijn Wydaeghe	Guillaume De Mevius	Citroën C3 R5	3:51:44.8	+17:16.2	6	0
21	8	30	"Pedro"	Emanuele Baldaccini	"Pedro"	Ford Fiesta R5	3:52:11.6	+17:43.0	4	0
30	9	25	Adrien Fourmaux	Renaud Jamoul	Adrien Fourmaux	Ford Fiesta R5	3:58:19.2	+23:50.6	2	0
44	10	34	Pierre-Louis Loubet	Vincent Landais	Pierre-Louis Loubet	Škoda Fabia R5	4:05:12.5	+30:43.9	1	0
47	11	36	Simone Tempestini	Sergiu Itu	Simone Tempestini	Hyundai i20 R5	4:06:30.2	+32:01.6	0	0
49	12	24	Yoann Bonato	Benjamin Boulloud	Yoann Bonato	Citroën C3 R5	4:08:08.1	+33:39.5	0	0
Retired SS13		23	Ole Christian Veiby	Jonas Andersson	Ole Christian Veiby	Volkswagen Polo GTI R5	Lost wheel		0	0
Retired SS12		27	Eric Camilli	Francios-Xavier Buresi	Eric Camilli	Volkswagen Polo GTI R5	Fire		0	0
Retired SS9		32	Nicolas Ciamin	Yannick Roche	Nicolas Ciamin	Volkswagen Polo GTI R5	Mechanical		0	0
Retired SS3		37	Nil Solans	Marc Martí	Nil Solans	Ford Fiesta R5	Mechanical		0	0

==== Special stages ====
Results in bold denote first in the RC2 class, the class which both the WRC-2 Pro and WRC-2 championships run to.

Date	No.	Stage name	Distance	Winners	Car	Time	Class leaders
28 March	—	Sorbo Ocagnano [Shakedown]	5.39 km	**Camilli / Buresi**	Volkswagen Polo GTI R5	3:54.9	—N/a
29 March	SS1	Bavella 1	17.60 km	**Camilli / Buresi**	Volkswagen Polo GTI R5	10:47.5	Camilli / Buresi
29 March	SS2	Valinco 1	25.94 km	**Camilli / Buresi**	Volkswagen Polo GTI R5	14:58.7	Camilli / Buresi
29 March	SS3	Alta-Rocca 1	17.37 km	**Camilli / Buresi**	Volkswagen Polo GTI R5	10:30.8	Camilli / Buresi
29 March	SS4	Bavella 2	17.60 km	**Camilli / Buresi**	Volkswagen Polo GTI R5	10:44.2	Camilli / Buresi
29 March	SS5	Valinco 2	25.94 km	**Camilli / Buresi**	Volkswagen Polo GTI R5	14:55.2	Camilli / Buresi
29 March	SS6	Alta-Rocca 2	17.37 km	**Camilli / Buresi**	Volkswagen Polo GTI R5	10:29.6	Camilli / Buresi
30 March	SS7	Cap Corse 1	25.62 km	**Camilli / Buresi**	Volkswagen Polo GTI R5	16:34.9	Camilli / Buresi
30 March	SS8	Désert des Agriates 1	14.45 km	**Camilli / Buresi**	Volkswagen Polo GTI R5	8:17.2	Camilli / Buresi
30 March	SS9	Castagniccia 1	47.18 km	**Andolfi / Scattolin**	Škoda Fabia R5	30:57.9	Andolfi / Scattolin
30 March	SS10	Cap Corse 2	25.62 km	**Camilli / Buresi**	Volkswagen Polo GTI R5	16:35.5	Andolfi / Scattolin
30 March	SS11	Désert des Agriates 2	14.45 km	**Camilli / Buresi**	Volkswagen Polo GTI R5	8:20.2	Andolfi / Scattolin
30 March	SS12	Castagniccia 2	47.18 km	Stage interrupted (Note: The car of Eric Camilli and Francios-Xavier Buresi was on fire during the stage, which caused the stage to be interrupted. As a result, all cars except World Rally Cars were given 31:51.7 to their times.)			
31 March	SS13	Eaux de Zilia	31.85 km	**Gryazin / Fedorov**	Škoda Fabia R5	16:49.1	Gryazin / Fedorov
31 March	SS14	Calvi	19.34 km	**Andolfi / Scattolin**	Škoda Fabia R5	10:41.8	Andolfi / Scattolin

==== Championship standings ====
Pos.	Drivers' championships			Co-drivers' championships		
Pos.	Move	Driver	Points	Move	Co-driver	Points
1		Ole Christian Veiby	40		Jonas Andersson	40
2	9	Nikolay Gryazin	28	9	Yaroslav Fedorov	28
3	1	Yoann Bonato	25	1	Benjamin Boulloud	25
4	1	Benito Guerra	25	1	Jaime Zapata	25
5		Fabio Andolfi	25		Simone Scattolin	25

=== Junior World Rally Championship ===
Jan Solans started rally impressively, with over six seconds faster than any driver of the class in the first stage. However, a puncture cost him over two minutes and handled championship leader Tom Kristensson a comfortable lead. In the end, Julius Tannert put the rally into his pocket after an intense fight with championship leader Kristensson.

==== Classification ====
Position		No.	Driver	Co-driver	Entrant	Car	Time	Difference	Points	
Event	Class	No.	Driver	Co-driver	Entrant	Car	Time	Difference	Class	Stage
20	1	81	Julius Tannert	Helmar Hinneberg	ADAC Sachsen	Ford Fiesta R2	3:52:10.0	0.0	25	3
22	2	71	Tom Kristensson	Henrik Appelskog	Tom Kristensson	Ford Fiesta R2	3:52:11.9	+1.9	18	2
24	3	74	Dennis Rådström	Johan Johansson	Dennis Rådström	Ford Fiesta R2	3:52:35.8	+25.8	12	1
28	4	73	Jan Solans	Mauro Barreiro	Rally Team Spain	Ford Fiesta R2	3:57:38.8	+4:48.8	12	7
31	5	75	Tom Williams	Phil Hall	Tom Williams	Ford Fiesta R2	3:58:46.7	+6:36.7	10	0
33	6	72	Roland Poom	Ken Järveoja	Roland Poom	Ford Fiesta R2	3:59:45.3	+7:35.3	8	0
34	7	83	Raul Baidu	Gabriel Lazar	Raul Baidu	Ford Fiesta R2	4:00:10.3	+8:00.3	6	0
36	8	78	Enrico Oldrati	Elia De Guio	Enrico Oldrati	Ford Fiesta R2	4:00:40.5	+8:30.5	4	0
38	9	82	Nico Knacker	Tobias Braun	ADAC Weiser-Ems	Ford Fiesta R2	4:01:46.9	+9:36.9	2	0
41	10	80	Fabrizio Zaldívar	Fernando Mussano	Fabrizio Zaldívar	Ford Fiesta R2	4:03:52.8	+11:42.8	1	0
Retired SS6		79	Ken Torn	Kuldar Sikk	OT Racing	Ford Fiesta R5	Engine		0	0
Retired SS3		76	Mārtiņš Sesks	Krišjānis Caune	LMT Autosporta Akadēmija	Ford Fiesta R5	Accident		0	0
Retired SS2		77	Sean Johnston	Alex Kihurani	Sean Johnston	Ford Fiesta R5	Accident		0	0

==== Special stages ====
Date	No.	Stage name	Distance	Winners	Car	Time	Class leaders
28 March	—	Sorbo Ocagnano [Shakedown]	5.39 km	Kristensson / Appelskog	Ford Fiesta R2	4:19.3	—N/a
29 March	SS1	Bavella 1	17.60 km	Solans / Barreiro	Ford Fiesta R2	11:43.6	Solans / Barreiro
29 March	SS2	Valinco 1	25.94 km	Kristensson / Appelskog	Ford Fiesta R2	16:41.3	Kristensson / Appelskog
29 March	SS3	Alta-Rocca 1	17.37 km	Kristensson / Appelskog	Ford Fiesta R2	11:40.6	Kristensson / Appelskog
29 March	SS4	Bavella 2	17.60 km	Solans / Barreiro	Ford Fiesta R2	11:44.9	Kristensson / Appelskog
29 March	SS5	Valinco 2	25.94 km	Solans / Barreiro	Ford Fiesta R2	16:33.7	Kristensson / Appelskog
29 March	SS6	Alta-Rocca 2	17.37 km	Solans / Barreiro	Ford Fiesta R2	11:35.2	Kristensson / Appelskog
30 March	SS7	Cap Corse 1	25.62 km	Solans / Barreiro	Ford Fiesta R2	18:22.2	Kristensson / Appelskog
30 March	SS8	Désert des Agriates 1	14.45 km	Solans / Barreiro	Ford Fiesta R2	9:02.5	Kristensson / Appelskog
30 March	SS9	Castagniccia 1	47.18 km	Tannert / Heigl	Ford Fiesta R2	33:58.9	Kristensson / Appelskog
30 March	SS10	Cap Corse 2	25.62 km	Rådström / Johansson	Ford Fiesta R2	18:17.4	Kristensson / Appelskog
30 March	SS11	Désert des Agriates 2	14.45 km	Solans / Barreiro	Ford Fiesta R2	9:01.5	Kristensson / Appelskog
30 March	SS12	Castagniccia 2	47.18 km	Stage interrupted			
31 March	SS13	Eaux de Zilia	31.85 km	Tannert / Heigl	Ford Fiesta R2	18:20.0	Kristensson / Appelskog
31 March	SS14	Calvi	19.34 km	Tannert / Heigl	Ford Fiesta R2	11:37.0	Tannert / Heigl

==== Championship standings ====
Pos.	Drivers' championships			Co-drivers' championships			Nations' championships		
Pos.	Move	Driver	Points	Move	Co-driver	Points	Move	Country	Points
1		Tom Kristensson	47		Henrik Appelskog	47		Sweden	43
2	1	Jan Solans	34	1	Mauro Barreiro	34	1	Spain	30
3	1	Dennis Rådström	32	1	Johan Johansson	32	1	Estonia	28
4		Julius Tannert	28		Jürgen Heigl	28	5	Germany	27
5	3	Roland Poom	26	3	Ken Järveoja	26	1	United Kingdom	24

== Notes ==
Previous rally: 2019 Rally Mexico	2019 FIA World Rally Championship	Next rally: 2019 Rally Argentina
Previous rally: 2018 Tour de Corse	2019 Tour de Corse	Next rally: TBD
