= Ole Christian Veiby =

Norwegian rally driver (born 1996)

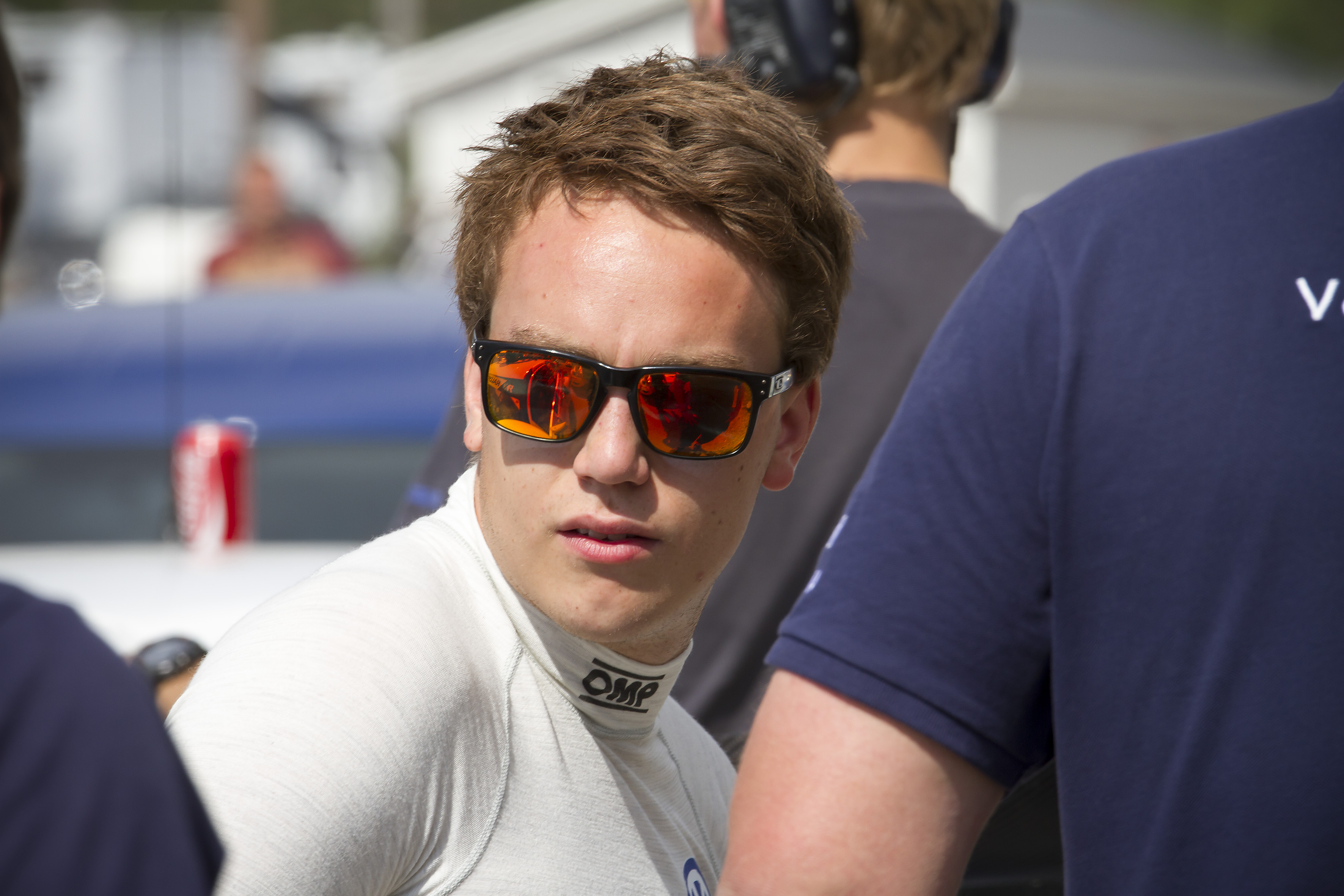

Personal information
- Nationality: Norwegian
- Born: 17 June 1996 (age 30); Kongsvinger, Norway

World Rally Championship record
- Years active: 2014–present
- Teams: Škoda Motorsport, Hyundai
- Rallies: 50
- Championships: 0
- Rally wins: 0
- Podiums: 0
- Stage wins: 0
- Total points: 8
- First rally: 2014 Rally Catalunya
- Last rally: 2022 Rally Sweden

FIA World Rallycross Championship
- Years active: 2014–2015, 2022-2024
- Car number: 96
- Former teams: Volkswagen Team Sweden; Volkswagen Dealer Team KMS
- Starts: 27
- Wins: 1
- Podiums: 13
- Best finish: 3rd in 2024

FIA ERX Supercar Championship
- Years active: 2014–2015, 2022
- Car number: 52
- Former teams: Volkswagen Team Sweden; Volkswagen Dealer Team KMS
- Starts: 7
- Wins: 1
- Podiums: 3
- Best finish: 3rd in 2015

Championship titles
- 2017: APRC Pacific Cup

Ole Christian Veiby is a professional rally driver from Norway driving for Hyundai Motorsport in the WRC-2 category of the World Rally Championship. He was the 2017 Asia-Pacific Rally Vice-Champion, the 2015 Junior WRC Vice-Champion, the 2011 Norwegian 125 Crosskart Champion, and was the Rookie of the Year in the 2013 Porsche Carrera Cup Scandinavia.

== Racing record ==
=== Complete World Rally Championship results ===
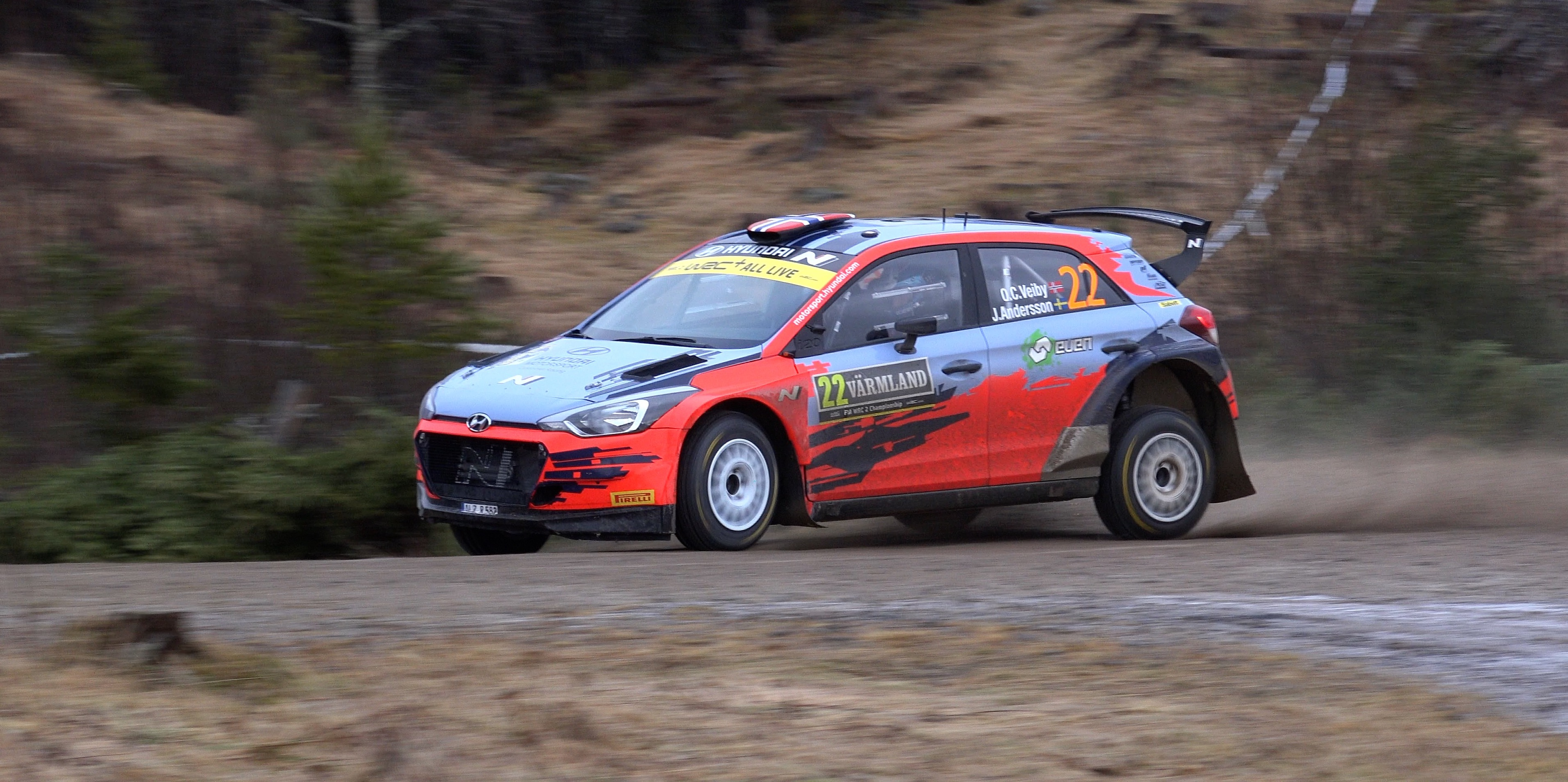
Veiby in a Hyundai i20 R5 at the 2020 Rally Sweden.

Year	Entrant	Car	1	2	3	4	5	6	7	8	9	10	11	12	13	14	Pos.	Points
2014	Ole Christian Veiby	Citroën DS3 R3T	MON	SWE	MEX	POR	ARG	ITA	POL	FIN	GER	AUS	FRA	ESP; Ret	GBR; 34		NC	0
2015	Printsport	Citroën DS3 R3T	MON; 25	SWE; 21	MEX	ARG	POR; 35	ITA	POL	FIN; 22	GER	AUS	FRA; 95	ESP; 48	GBR; 23		NC	0
2016	Printsport	Citroën DS3 R3T	MON; 19				POR; 40	ITA	POL; 29	FIN; 19	GER; 67	CHN; C	FRA; 31				NC	0
2016	Printsport	Škoda Fabia R5		SWE; 16	MEX	ARG								ESP; 28	GBR; 19	AUS	NC	0
2017	Printsport	Škoda Fabia R5	MON	SWE; 11	MEX	FRA; 14	ARG	POR	ITA; 11	POL; 12	FIN; Ret	GER	ESP; 10				23rd	1
2017	Škoda Motorsport	Škoda Fabia R5												GBR; 37	AUS		23rd	1
2018	Ole Christian Veiby	Škoda Fabia R5	MON; Ret				ARG; 11										NC	0
2018	Škoda Motorsport	Škoda Fabia R5		SWE; 13	MEX			POR		FIN; Ret		TUR					NC	0
2018	Škoda Motorsport II	Škoda Fabia R5				FRA; 12			ITA; 12								NC	0
2018	Printsport	Škoda Fabia R5									GER; 17						NC	0
2018	PH Sport	Citroën C3 R5											GBR; 26	ESP; 20	AUS		NC	0
2019	Ole Christian Veiby	Volkswagen Polo GTI R5	MON; 12	SWE; 9	MEX	FRA; Ret	ARG	CHL	POR; Ret	ITA; 20	FIN	GER	TUR	GBR; 35	ESP; 16	AUS; C	22nd	2
2020	Hyundai Motorsport N	Hyundai i20 R5	MON; Ret	SWE; 13	MEX; 10	EST; Ret	TUR	ITA; 12									24th	1
2020	Hyundai 2C Competition	Hyundai i20 Coupe WRC							MNZ; Ret								24th	1
2021	Hyundai Motorsport N	Hyundai i20 R5	MON	ARC; 16	CRO	POR; DNS	ITA; WD	KEN	EST	BEL	GRE	FIN	ESP	MNZ			NC	0
2022	Ole Christian Veiby	Volkswagen Polo GTI R5	MON	SWE; 8	CRO	POR	ITA	KEN	EST	FIN	BEL	GRE	NZL	ESP	JPN		27th	4

=== Complete World Rally Championship-2 results ===
Year	Entrant	Car	1	2	3	4	5	6	7	8	9	10	11	12	13	14	Pos.	Points
2016	Printsport	Škoda Fabia R5	MON	SWE; 6	MEX	ARG	POR	ITA	POL	FIN	GER	CHN; C	FRA	ESP; 5	GBR; 6	AUS	13th	26
2017	Printsport	Škoda Fabia R5	MON	SWE; 3	MEX	FRA; 5	ARG	POR	ITA; 2	POL; 1	FIN; WD	GER	ESP				6th	68
2017	Škoda Motorsport	Škoda Fabia R5												GBR; 16	AUS		6th	68
2018	Škoda Motorsport	Škoda Fabia R5	MON	SWE; 3	MEX					FIN; Ret	GER	TUR					7th	47
2018	Škoda Motorsport II	Škoda Fabia R5				FRA; 4	ARG	POR	ITA; 2								7th	47
2018	PH Sport	Citroën C3 R5											GBR; 11	ESP; 9	AUS		7th	47
2019	Ole Christian Veiby	Volkswagen Polo GTI R5	MON; 3	SWE; 1	MEX	FRA; Ret	ARG	CHL	POR; Ret	ITA; 5	FIN	GER	TUR	GBR; 11	ESP; 4	AUS; C	6th	62
2020	Hyundai Motorsport N	Hyundai i20 R5	MON; Ret	SWE; 2	MEX; 3	EST; Ret	TUR	ITA; 2	MNZ								4th	51
2021	Hyundai Motorsport N	Hyundai i20 R5	MON	ARC; 5	CRO	POR; DNS	ITA; WD	KEN	EST	BEL	GRE	FIN	ESP	MNZ			16th	13
2022	Ole Christian Veiby	Volkswagen Polo GTI R5	MON	SWE; 2	CRO	POR	ITA	KEN	EST	FIN	BEL	GRE	NZL	ESP	JPN		20th	18

=== Complete FIA World Rallycross Championship results ===
==== Supercar/RX1e/RX1 ====
Year	Entrant	Car	1	2	3	4	5	6	7	8	9	10	11	12	13	WRX	Points
2014	Volkswagen Dealer Team KMS	Volkswagen Polo	POR	GBR	NOR	FIN	SWE; 21	BEL; 18	CAN	FRA	GER	ITA	TUR	ARG		56th	0
2015	Volkswagen Team Sweden	Volkswagen Polo	POR	HOC	BEL	GBR	GER	SWE; 9	CAN	NOR	FRA	BAR	TUR	ITA	ARG; 10	19th	19
2022	Kristoffersson Motorsport	Volkswagen Polo RX1e	NOR; 3	LAT; 4	LAT; 3	POR; 2	POR; 2	BNL; 8	BNL; 5	ESP; 6	ESP; 3	GER; 4				4th	124
2023	Volkswagen Dealerteam BAUHAUS	Volkswagen Polo RX1e	POR; 4	NOR; 6	SWE; 3	GBR; C	BNL; C	GER; C								5th	82
2023	Volkswagen Dealerteam BAUHAUS	OMSE ZEROID X1							RSA; 6	RSA; 7	CHN; 4	CHN; 2				5th	82
2024	KMS - HORSE Powertrain	Volkswagen Polo KMS 601 RX	SWE; 5	SWE; 3	HUN; 2	HUN; 2	BNL; 2	BNL; 3	PRT; 4	PRT; 5	CHN; 1	CHN; 6				3rd	190

=== Complete FIA European Rallycross Championship results ===
==== Supercar/RX1 ====
Year	Entrant	Car	1	2	3	4	5	ERX	Points
2014	Volkswagen Dealer Team KMS	Volkswagen Polo	GBR	NOR	BEL; 10	GER	ITA	29th	7
2015	Volkswagen Team Sweden	Volkswagen Polo	BEL; 2	GER; 7	NOR; 18	BAR; 1	ITA; 3	3rd	86
2022	JC Raceteknik	Audi S1	HUN	SWE; 8	NOR	LVA	BLX	25th	8

=== Complete Extreme E results ===
(key)

Year	Team	Car	1	2	Pos.	Points
2025	Team EVEN	Spark ODYSSEY 21	DES; 1; 2	DES; 2; 4	N/A	N/A
