= Citroën C3 R5/Rally2 =

French rally car

Citroën C3 Rally2
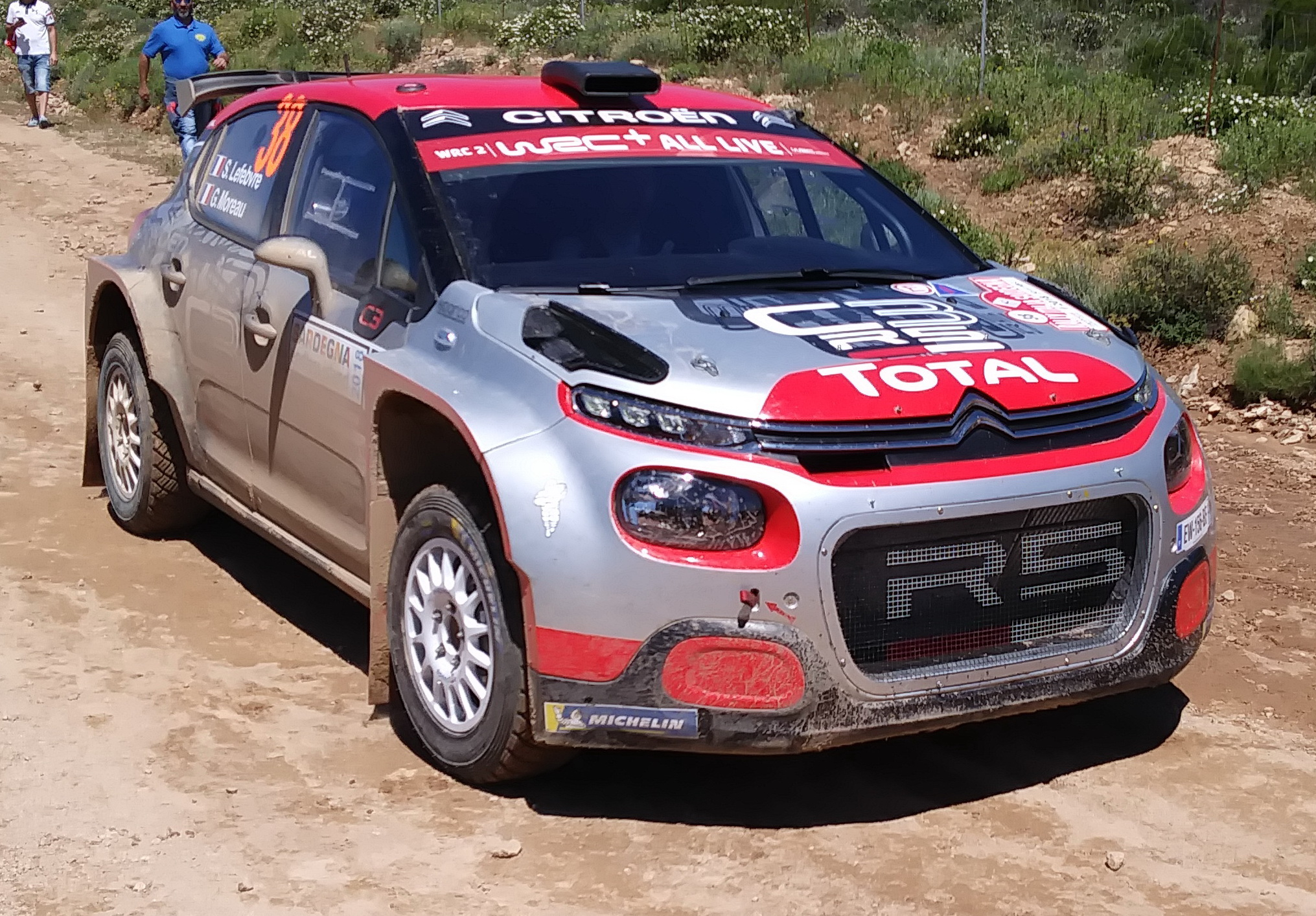
- A Citroën C3 Rally2 at the 2018 Rally Italia Sardegna
- Category: R5/Rally2
- Constructor: Citroën Racing
- Predecessor: Citroën DS3 R5; Peugeot 208 T16
- Successor: Lancia Ypsilon Rally2 HF Integrale (for many official and private teams)

Technical specifications
- Length: 3,996 mm (157.3 in)
- Width: 1,820 mm (71.7 in)
- Axle track: 1,618 mm (63.7 in)
- Wheelbase: 2,567 mm (101.1 in)
- Engine: Citroën Racing 1,598 cc (97.5 cu in) turbocharged front transverse
- Transmission: SADEV five-speed sequential 4-wheel drive
- Power: R5: 280 bhp (210 kW); Rally2: 282 bhp (210 kW)
- Weight: 1,230 kg

Competition history
- Notable entrants: (France) Citroën World Rally Team (France) CHL Sport Auto (Belgium) DG Sport
- Notable drivers: (France) Yoann Bonato (France) Stéphane Lefebvre (Russia) Alexey Lukyanuk (Norway) Mads Østberg (Romania) Simone Tempestini (Norway) Ole Christian Veiby (France) Eric Camilli (Bulgaria) Nikolay Gryazin (Italy) Andrea Crugnola (France) Yohan Rossel (France) Léo Rossel
- Debut: 2018 Tour de Corse (WRC-2)
- First win: 2019 Rally Argentina
Races	Wins	Podiums
13	1	6
- Teams' Championships: 1 (DG Sport, 2024)
- Constructors' Championships: 0
- Drivers' Championships: 2 ( (Norway) Mads Østberg, 2020 WRC2 (France) Yohan Rossel, 2021 WRC3)

The Citroën C3 Rally2 (originally known as the Citroën C3 R5) is a rally car built by Citroën World Rally Team. It is based upon the Citroën C3 road car and is built to R5 regulations. The car made its début at the 2018 Tour de Corse where it was driven by the French crews of Stéphane Lefebvre and Gabin Moreau, and Yoann Bonato and Benjamin Boulloud.

== Background ==
In early 2017, Citroën began the development of the C3 R5. The C3 would be designed to improve on the previous offerings of Groupe PSA in the R5 discipline, the Peugeot 208 T16 and the Citroën DS3 R5, both of which proved problematic and unpopular with R5 customers. The C3 had little relation to its predecessor, the DS3.

=== Development ===
Throughout summer 2017, Citroën Racing Technologies employed factory Citroën drivers Stéphane Lefebvre and Craig Breen as part of the development team for the C3, along with Yoann Bonato, who was hired for the project. The first working model was completed in September of 2017, and a month later the test C3 made its public debut at the Rallye du Var, with Bonato driving a few stages as a non-competitive entrant to the rally.

=== Competition ===
The Citroën C3 R5 passed international homologation on 1 January 2018, and was now ready for competition. It made its competitive rallying debut at the Tour de Corse in April of that year, with Yoann Bonato taking second place in the WRC-2 class, and 10th overall in the rally.

Including the original test cars, a total of 26 C3 R5s had been constructed by 1 May 2019, with 22 having been sold to independent teams. In the hands of Yoann Bonato, the C3 R5 won the French Rally Championship in 2018, and continues to be used by the Citroën World Rally Team in the WRC-2 Pro class of the World Rally Championship, in the hands of Mads Østberg. Østberg would give the C3 R5 its first World Championship-level victory at the 2019 Rally Argentina. Although Citroën withdrew from the World Rally Championship in 2020, it continued as a manufacturer team in the WRC-2 and made the C3 R5 available to privateer teams in the WRC-3.

The C3 R5 was renamed the Citroën C3 Rally2 ahead of the 2021 championships.

== Rally victories ==
=== World Rally Championship-2 Pro ===
Year	No.	Event	Surface	Driver	Co-driver
2019	1	2019 Rally Sweden	Snow	(Norway) Mads Østberg	(Norway) Torstein Eriksen
2019	2	2019 Rally Argentina	Gravel	(Norway) Mads Østberg	(Norway) Torstein Eriksen
2019	3	(Spain) 2019 Rally Catalunya	Tarmac	(Norway) Mads Østberg	(Norway) Torstein Eriksen

=== World Rally Championship-2 ===
Year	No.	Event	Surface	Driver	Co-driver
2019	1	(Monaco) 2019 Monte Carlo Rally	Mixed	(France) Yoann Bonato	(France) Benjamin Boulloud
2019	2	(Spain) 2019 Rally Catalunya	Mixed	(France) Eric Camilli	(France) Benjamin Veillas
2020	3	(Monaco) 2020 Monte Carlo Rally	Mixed	(Norway) Mads Østberg	(Norway) Torstein Eriksen
2020	4	2020 Rally Sweden	Snow	(Norway) Mads Østberg	(Norway) Torstein Eriksen
2020	5	2020 Rally Estonia	Gravel	(Norway) Mads Østberg	(Norway) Torstein Eriksen
2020	6	(Italy) 2020 Rally Monza	Tarmac	(Norway) Mads Østberg	(Norway) Torstein Eriksen
2021	7	2021 Croatia Rally	Tarmac	(Norway) Mads Østberg	(Norway) Torstein Eriksen
2021	8	(Spain) 2021 Rally Catalunya	Tarmac	(France) Eric Camilli	(France) Maxime Vilmot
2022	9	2022 Croatia Rally	Tarmac	(France) Yohan Rossel	(France) Valentin Sarreaud
2022	10	2022 Rally de Portugal	Gravel	(France) Yohan Rossel	(France) Valentin Sarreaud
2022	11	(Belgium) 2022 Ypres Rally	Tarmac	(France) Stéphane Lefebvre	(France) Andy Malfoy
2023	12	(Monaco) 2023 Monte Carlo Rally	Mixed	(France) Yohan Rossel	(France) Arnaud Dunand
2023	13	2023 Croatia Rally	Tarmac	(France) Yohan Rossel	(France) Arnaud Dunand
2024	14	(Monaco) 2024 Monte Carlo Rally	Mixed	(France) Yohan Rossel	(France) Arnaud Dunand
2024	15	2024 Croatia Rally	Tarmac	(Bulgaria) Nikolay Gryazin	(Authorised Neutral Athletes) Konstantin Aleksandrov
2024	16	2024 Rally Chile	Gravel	(France) Yohan Rossel	(France) Florian Barral
2024	17	(Europe) 2024 Central European Rally	Tarmac	(Bulgaria) Nikolay Gryazin	(Authorised Neutral Athletes) Konstantin Aleksandrov
2024	18	2024 Rally Japan	Tarmac	(Bulgaria) Nikolay Gryazin	(Authorised Neutral Athletes) Konstantin Aleksandrov
2025	19	(Monaco) 2025 Monte Carlo Rally	Mixed	(France) Yohan Rossel	(France) Arnaud Dunand
2025	20	(Spain) 2025 Rally Islas Canarias	Tarmac	(France) Yohan Rossel	(France) Arnaud Dunand
2026	21	(Monaco) 2026 Monte Carlo Rally	Mixed	(France) Léo Rossel	(France) Guillaume Mercoiret

=== World Rally Championship-3 ===
Year	No.	Event	Surface	Driver	Co-driver
2020	1	(Monaco) 2020 Monte Carlo Rally	Mixed	(France) Eric Camilli	(France) François-Xavier Buresi
2020	2	2020 Rally Mexico	Gravel	(Bolivia) Marco Bulacia	(Italy) Giovanni Bernacchini
2021	3	(Monaco) 2021 Monte Carlo Rally	Mixed	(France) Yohan Rossel	(France) Benoît Fulcrand
2021	4	(Italy) 2021 Rally Italia Sardegna	Gravel	(France) Yohan Rossel	(France) Alexandre Coria
2021	5	(Belgium) 2021 Ypres Rally	Tarmac	(France) Yohan Rossel	(France) Alexandre Coria

=== European Rally Championship ===
Year	No.	Event	Surface	Driver	Co-driver
2019	1	(Spain) 2019 Rally Islas Canarias	Tarmac	(Spain) Pepe López	(Spain) Borja Rozada
2019	2	2019 Rally Poland	Gravel	(Russia) Alexey Lukyanuk	(Russia) Alexey Arnautov
2020	3	(Italy) 2020 Rally di Roma Capitale	Tarmac	(Russia) Alexey Lukyanuk	(Russia) Dmitriy Eremeev
2020	4	(Portugal) 2020 Rally Fafe Montelongo	Tarmac	(Russia) Alexey Lukyanuk	(Russia) Dmitriy Eremeev
2021	5	2021 Rally Poland	Gravel	(Russia) Alexey Lukyanuk	(Russia) Alexey Arnautov
2021	6	2021 Rally Hungary	Tarmac	(Norway) Mads Østberg	(Norway) Torstein Eriksen
2021	7	(Spain) 2021 Rally Islas Canarias	Tarmac	(Russia) Alexey Lukyanuk	(Russia) Alexey Arnautov
2022	8	(Spain) 2022 Rally de Catalunya	Tarmac	(France) Yoann Bonato	(France) Benjamin Boulloud
2023	9	(Spain) 2023 Rally Islas Canarias	Tarmac	(France) Yoann Bonato	(France) Benjamin Boulloud
2023	10	(Italy) 2023 Rally di Roma Capitale	Tarmac	(Italy) Andrea Crugnola	(Italy) Pietro Ometto
2023	11	2023 Rally Hungary	Tarmac	(Norway) Mads Østberg	(Sweden) Patrik Barth
2024	12	(Spain) 2024 Rally Islas Canarias	Tarmac	(France) Yoann Bonato	(France) Benjamin Boulloud
2024	13	(Italy) 2024 Rally di Roma Capitale	Tarmac	(Italy) Andrea Crugnola	(Italy) Pietro Ometto

== Rally results ==
=== WRC-2 Pro results - factory team ===
Year	Team	Driver	1	2	3	4	5	6	7	8	9	10	11	12	13	14	Pos.	Points
2018	(France) Citroën Total Rallye Team	(France) Stephane Lefebvre	MON	SWE	MEX	FRA; Ret	ARG	POR; 3	ITA; 8	FIN; 13	DEU; 8	TUR	GBR; 5	ESP; 15	AUS		13th	33
2018	(France) Citroën Total Rallye Team	(Romania) Simone Tempestini	MON	SWE	MEX	FRA	ARG	POR	ITA; Ret	FIN; 9	DEU; 10	TUR	GBR	ESP	AUS		15th*	28*
2018	(France) Citroën Total Rallye Team	(Norway) Ole Christian Veiby	MON	SWE	MEX	FRA	ARG	POR	ITA	FIN	DEU	TUR	GBR	ESP; 9	AUS		7th*	47*
2019	(France) Citroën Total WRT	(Norway) Mads Østberg	MON	SWE; 1	MEX	FRA	ARG; 1	CHI; 2	POR; 3	ITA; 3	FIN	DEU; 4	TUR	GBR; 5	CAT; 1	AUS	2nd	145

=== WRC-2 Results - third party entrants ===
Year	Team	Driver	1	2	3	4	5	6	7	8	9	10	11	12	13	14	Pos.	Points
2018	(France) CHL Sport Auto	(France) Yoann Bonato	MON	SWE	MEX	FRA; 2	ARG	POR	ITA	FIN	DEU; 11	TUR	GBR	CAT	AUS		21st	18
2018	(Romania) Simone Tempestini	(Romania) Simone Tempestini	MON	SWE	MEX	FRA	ARG	POR	ITA	FIN	DEU	TUR; 2	GBR; 7	CAT; 10	AUS		15th*	28*
2019	(France) CHL Sport Auto	(France) Yoann Bonato	MON; 1	SWE	MEX	FRA; 12	ARG	CHI	POR	ITA	FIN	DEU	TUR	GBR	CAT	AUS	5th	25
2019	(Belgium) DG Sport	(Belgium) Guillaume De Mévius	MON; Ret	SWE	MEX	FRA; 7	ARG	CHI	POR	ITA	FIN	DEU	TUR	GBR	CAT	AUS	21st	6

- * scored points with different entries. - ** season still in progress.

== See also ==
- Citroën C3 WRC
- Group R
  - Ford Fiesta R5
  - Hyundai i20 R5
  - Škoda Fabia R5
  - Volkswagen Polo GTI R5
