= 2018 Tour de Corse =

Motor rally competition

2018 Tour de Corse 61^{e} Corsica Linea – Tour de Corse
Round 4 of 13 in the 2018 World Rally Championship
← Previous event	Next event →
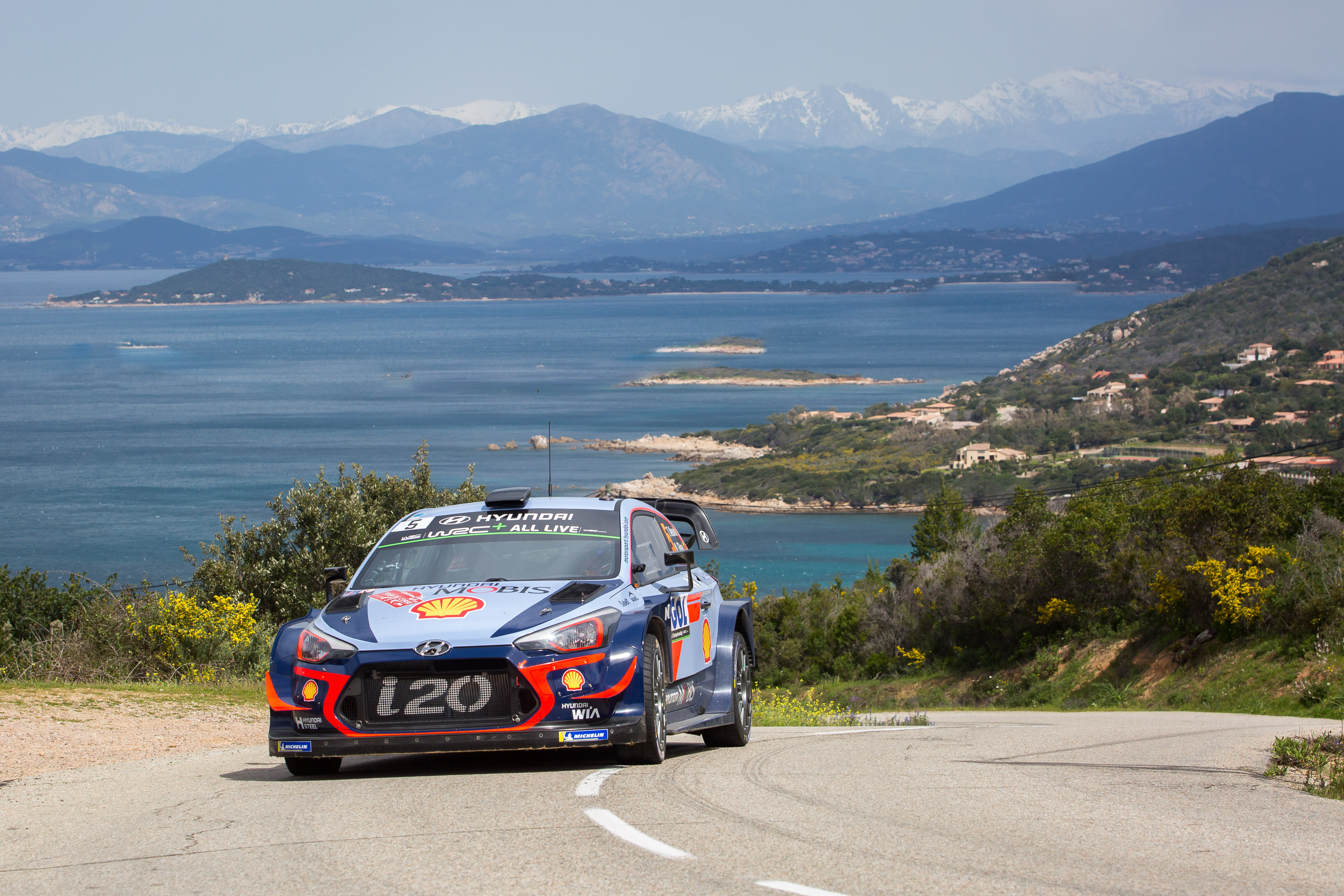
- The Hyundai i20 Coupe WRC of Thierry Neuville and Nicolas Gilsoul during the event.
- Host country: France
- Rally base: Bastia, Corsica
- Dates run: 5 – 8 April 2018
- Start location: La Porta, Corsica
- Finish location: Coti-Chiavari, Corsica
- Stages: 12 (333.48 km; 207.21 miles)
- Stage surface: Tarmac
- Transport distance: 1,119.68 km (695.74 miles)
- Overall distance: 1,454.16 km (903.57 miles)

Statistics
- Crews registered: 92
- Crews: 87 at start, 71 at finish

Overall results
- Overall winner: (France) Sébastien Ogier (France) Julien Ingrassia (United Kingdom) M-Sport Ford WRT; 3:26:52.7
- Power Stage winner: (Finland) Esapekka Lappi (Finland) Janne Ferm (Japan) Toyota Gazoo Racing WRT

Support category results
- WRC-2 winner: (Czech Republic) Jan Kopecký (Czech Republic) Pavel Dresler (Czech Republic) Škoda Motorsport II; 3:37:27.5
- WRC-3 winner: (France) Jean-Baptiste Franceschi (France) Romain Courbon (France) Jean-Baptiste Franceschi; 3:56:28.7

The 2018 Tour de Corse (formally known as the Corsica Linea – Tour de Corse 2018) was a motor racing event for rally cars that was held over four days between 5 and 8 April 2018. It marked the sixty-first running of the Tour de Corse and the fourth round of the 2018 World Rally Championship and its support categories, the WRC-2 and WRC-3 championships. It was also the second round of the Junior World Rally Championship. The event was based in the town of Bastia in Corsica, and was contested over twelve special stages totalling a competitive distance of 333.48 km (207.21 mi).

Thierry Neuville and Nicolas Gilsoul were the defending rally winners. Their team, Hyundai Shell Mobis WRT, were the defending manufacturers' winners. Sébastien Ogier and Julien Ingrassia were the rally winners. Their team, M-Sport Ford WRT, were the manufacturers' winners. The Škoda Motorsport II crew of Jan Kopecký and Pavel Dresler won the World Rally Championship-2 category in a Škoda Fabia R5, while local crew Jean-Baptiste Franceschi and Romain Courbon won the World Rally Championship-3 and Junior World Rally Championship.

== Background ==
=== Championship standings prior to the event ===
Sébastien Ogier and Julien Ingrassia entered the round with a four-point lead in the World Championships for Drivers and Co-drivers. In the World Championship for Manufacturers, Hyundai Shell Mobis WRT held a twelve-point lead over M-Sport Ford WRT.

=== Route ===
The route of the 2018 event was substantially revised, with only two of the stages—La Porta – Valle di Rostino and Novella—carried over from the 2017 rally. The event was based in Bastia, which hosted the rally for the first time since 1978.

=== Entry list ===
The following crews were entered into the rally. The event was open to crews competing in the World Rally Championship, World Rally Championship-2, and the World Rally Championship-3. The final entry list consisted of fourteen World Rally Cars, eleven World Rally Championship-2 entries, and fifteen World Rally Championship-3 entries, fourteen of which were eligible to score points in the Junior World Rally Championship.

No.	Entrant	Driver	Co-Driver	Car	Tyre
World Rally Car entries
1	(United Kingdom) M-Sport Ford WRT	(France) Sébastien Ogier	(France) Julien Ingrassia	Ford Fiesta WRC	M
2	(United Kingdom) M-Sport Ford WRT	(United Kingdom) Elfyn Evans	(United Kingdom) Phil Mills	Ford Fiesta WRC	M
3	(United Kingdom) M-Sport Ford WRT	(France) Bryan Bouffier	(France) Xavier Panseri	Ford Fiesta WRC	M
4	(South Korea) Hyundai Shell Mobis WRT	(Norway) Andreas Mikkelsen	(Norway) Anders Jæger-Synnevaag	Hyundai i20 Coupe WRC	M
5	(South Korea) Hyundai Shell Mobis WRT	(Belgium) Thierry Neuville	(Belgium) Nicolas Gilsoul	Hyundai i20 Coupe WRC	M
6	(South Korea) Hyundai Shell Mobis WRT	(Spain) Dani Sordo	(Spain) Carlos del Barrio	Hyundai i20 Coupe WRC	M
7	(Japan) Toyota Gazoo Racing WRT	(Finland) Jari-Matti Latvala	(Finland) Miikka Anttila	Toyota Yaris WRC	M
8	(Japan) Toyota Gazoo Racing WRT	(Estonia) Ott Tänak	(Estonia) Martin Järveoja	Toyota Yaris WRC	M
9	(Japan) Toyota Gazoo Racing WRT	(Finland) Esapekka Lappi	(Finland) Janne Ferm	Toyota Yaris WRC	M
10	(France) Citroën Total Abu Dhabi WRT	(United Kingdom) Kris Meeke	(Republic of Ireland) Paul Nagle	Citroën C3 WRC	M
11	(France) Citroën Total Abu Dhabi WRT	(France) Sébastien Loeb	(Monaco) Daniel Elena	Citroën C3 WRC	M
81	(Italy) Mauro Miele	(Italy) Mauro Miele	(Italy) Luca Beltrame	Citroën DS3 WRC	M
82	(France) Armando Pereira	(France) Armando Pereira	(France) Remi Tutélaire	Ford Fiesta RS WRC	P
83	(France) Alain Vauthier	(France) Alain Vauthier	(France) Stevie Nollet	Ford Fiesta RS WRC	M
World Rally Championship-2 entries
31	(Czech Republic) Škoda Motorsport II	(Czech Republic) Jan Kopecký	(Czech Republic) Pavel Dresler	Škoda Fabia R5	M
32	(Finland) Tommi Mäkinen Racing	(Japan) Takamoto Katsuta	(Finland) Marko Salminen	Ford Fiesta R5	M
33	(Czech Republic) Škoda Motorsport II	(Norway) Ole Christian Veiby	(Norway) Stig Rune Skjærmoen	Škoda Fabia R5	M
35	(Finland) Tommi Mäkinen Racing	(Japan) Hiroki Arai	(Australia) Glenn MacNeall	Ford Fiesta R5	M
36	(Spain) Nil Solans	(Spain) Nil Solans	(Spain) Miquel Ibañez Sotos	Ford Fiesta R5	D
37	(Finland) Printsport	(Poland) Łukasz Pieniążek	(Poland) Przemysław Mazur	Škoda Fabia R5	M
38	(France) Citroën Total Rallye Team	(France) Stéphane Lefebvre	(France) Gabin Moreau	Citroën C3 R5	M
39	(Italy) BRC Racing Team	(France) Pierre-Louis Loubet	(France) Vincent Landais	Hyundai i20 R5	M
40	(France) Yoann Bonato	(France) Yoann Bonato	(France) Benjamin Boulloud	Citroën C3 R5	M
41	(Italy) ACI Team Italia	(Italy) Fabio Andolfi	(Italy) Simone Scattolin	Škoda Fabia R5	P
42	(France) Nicolas Ciamin	(France) Nicolas Ciamin	(France) Thibault de la Haye	Hyundai i20 R5	M
World Rally Championship-3 entries
61	(Sweden) Denis Rådström	(Sweden) Denis Rådström^{‡}	(Sweden) Johan Johansson	Ford Fiesta R2T	P
62	(Belgium) Amaury Molle	(Belgium) Amaury Molle	(Belgium) Renaud Herman	Peugeot 208 R2	M
63	(Sweden) Emil Bergkvist	(Sweden) Emil Bergkvist^{‡}	(Norway) Ola Fløene	Ford Fiesta R2T	P
64	(Germany) ADAC Sachsen	(Germany) Julius Tannert^{‡}	(Austria) Jürgen Heigl	Ford Fiesta R2T	P
65	(France) Jean-Baptiste Franceschi	(France) Jean-Baptiste Franceschi^{‡}	(France) Romain Courbon	Ford Fiesta R2T	P
66	(France) Terry Folb	(France) Terry Folb^{‡}	(France) Christopher Guieu	Ford Fiesta R2T	P
67	(Republic of Ireland) Callum Devine	(Republic of Ireland) Callum Devine^{‡}	(Republic of Ireland) Keith Moriarty	Ford Fiesta R2T	P
68	(Chile) Emilio Fernández	(Chile) Emilio Fernández^{‡}	(Chile) Joaquin Riquelme	Ford Fiesta R2T	P
69	(Italy) ACI Team Italia	(Italy) Luca Bottarelli^{‡}	(Italy) Manuel Fenoli	Ford Fiesta R2T	P
70	(New Zealand) David Holder	(New Zealand) David Holder^{‡}	(New Zealand) Jason Farmer	Ford Fiesta R2T	P
71	(Estonia) OT Racing	(Estonia) Ken Torn^{‡}	(Estonia) Ken Järveoja	Ford Fiesta R2T	P
72	(United Kingdom) Tom Williams	(United Kingdom) Tom Williams^{‡}	(United Kingdom) Phil Hall	Ford Fiesta R2T	P
73	(Italy) Enrico Oldrati	(Italy) Enrico Oldrati^{‡}	(Italy) Danilo Fappani	Ford Fiesta R2T	P
74	(Turkey) Castrol Ford Team Turkiye	(Turkey) Bugra Banaz^{‡}	(Turkey) Burak Erdener	Ford Fiesta R2T	P
75	(Italy) Umberto Accornero	(Italy) Umberto Accornero^{‡}	(Italy) Maurizio Barone	Ford Fiesta R2T	P
Other major entries
84	(United Kingdom) Gus Greensmith	(United Kingdom) Gus Greensmith	(United Kingdom) Craig Parry	Ford Fiesta R5	M

Notes

- ^‡ — Driver is eligible to score points in the FIA Junior World Rally Championship.

== Report ==
=== Pre-event ===
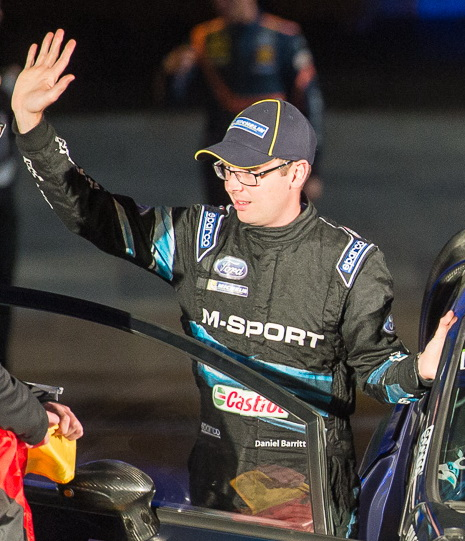
Elfyn Evans' co-driver Daniel Barritt (pictured) was replaced by Phil Mills in this rally.

In the week before the rally, the Fédération Internationale de l'Automobile (FIA) approved a rule change affecting the Power Stage. Any crew checking in late to the Power Stage will forfeit the opportunity to score bonus championship points in the Power Stage. The changes were introduced in response to a controversy that arose in previous rallies where crews deliberately checked in late, incurring time penalties but securing a preferable road position, thereby improving their chances of scoring bonus points.

Elfyn Evans' co-driver Daniel Barritt was replaced by Phil Mills as Barritt did not recover from an accident in Rally Mexico in time for the Tour de Corse.

Citroën's new R5 variant of the C3 WRC made its competitive début in the WRC-2 class during the rally.

=== Thursday ===
Thursday in Corsica only requires crews to complete a Shakedown. Kris Meeke and Paul Nagle won the stage, over two seconds faster than the Norwegian Andreas Mikkelsen. Last year winner Thierry Neuville finished third, half a second faster than teammate Dani Sordo. Current championship leader Sébastien Ogier was fifth. From sixth to tenth were Elfyn Evans, Sébastien Loeb, Ott Tänak, Jari-Matti Latvala and Esapekka Lappi respectively.

=== Friday ===
Defending world champion Sébastien Ogier was absolutely flying in Friday. He set three fastest stage times out of four and built a lead of over half a minute over the last year winner Thierry Neuville, who was struggling with the brakes. Nine-time world champion Sébastien Loeb, competing in the second of three guest appearances, carried too much pace into a left corner 400 metres after the start and dropped into a deep ditch. The rest stage won by Esapekka Lappi, who finished the day in fifth place, just less than one second ahead of Elfyn Evans and Dani Sordo. Kris Meeke, who suffered intermittent intercom problems in his C3, was third, 5.5 seconds ahead of Ott Tänak, who also had handling problems at the rear of his Toyota Yaris. Finland's Jari-Matti Latvala lacked confidence in his Toyota Yaris in eighth. Another 4.2 seconds behind was Andreas Mikkelsen. The Norwegian lost much time with a spin at the first corner in the opening stage and a brief trip into a ditch this morning, issues compounded by understeer when he tried to have a push this afternoon. Local man Bryan Bouffier completed the leaderboard in a Fiesta.

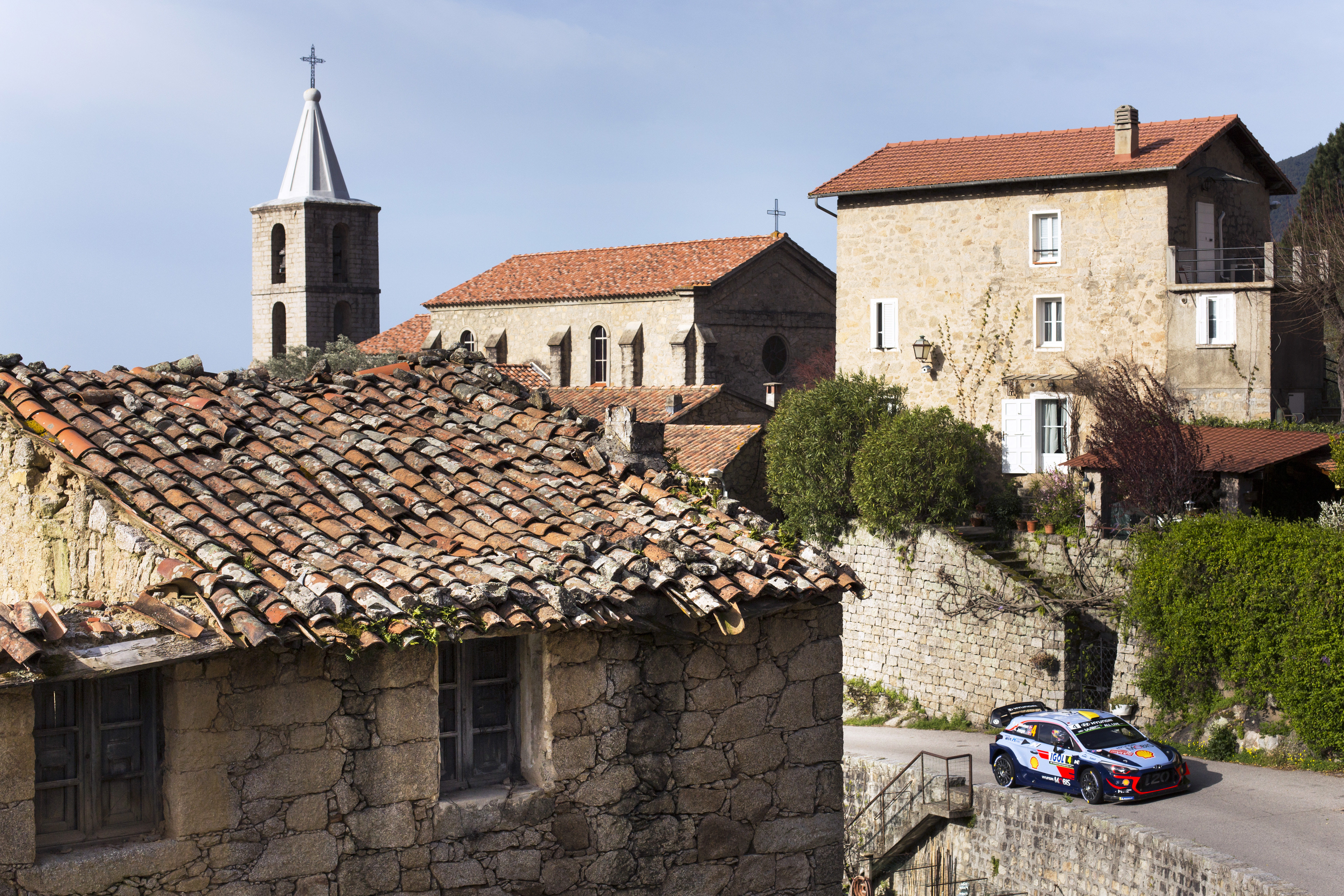
Andreas Mikkelsen and Anders Jæger-Synnevaag driving through the narrow Vero road.

=== Saturday ===
Championship leader Sébastien Ogier ended the day with a 44.5 seconds advantage over Thierry Neuville. Ott Tänak snatching position by a tenth of a second from the Belgium in the final Novella test, as Kris Meeke crashed his Citroën C3 into retirement after mishearing a pace note. Esapekka Lappi was another 10.3 seconds behind in fourth place. Dani Sordo and Elfyn Evans were evenly matched all day. The Spaniard ended fifth in his i20, with a 3.1-second advantage over the Welshman who lost time after stalling his Fiesta's engine and being too hesitant on the tricky mountain roads. Andreas Mikkelsen was bothered by understeering this weekend. He finished seventh, ahead of WRC 2 category leader Jan Kopecký. Jari-Matti Latvala retired his Yaris from eighth after slamming the rear into a tree and Bryan Bouffier went out with engine problems in his Fiesta, while nine-time world champion Sébastien Loeb, returning after yesterday's crash, won three stages in his C3. WRC 2 driver Fabio Andolfi and Ole Christian Veiby completed the provisional leaderboard in Škoda Fabia R5s.

=== Sunday ===
Sébastien Ogier led the Corsica linea - Tour de Corse from start to finish to win the three-day asphalt fixture by 36.1 seconds in his Ford Fiesta. Ott Tänak finished second in a Toyota Yaris, with Thierry Neuville, who suffered an engine issue at the power Stage, running out of the podium. Teammate Dani Sordo finished fourth after another consistent weekend, just 3.5 seconds ahead of Elfyn Evans. There was final day heartbreak for Esapekka Lappi. The Finn thrust himself into the fight for second yesterday, but his hopes were shattered when he hit a kerb and stopped to change a punctured tyre. He eventually plunged to seventh, but salvaged maximum bonus points by winning the final power Stage in his Yaris as well as overhauling Andreas Mikkelsen to climb to sixth. WRC 2 winner Jan Kopecký finished eighth ahead of Kris Meeke, who restarted today after Saturday's accident, with Yoann Bonato completed the top ten.

== Classification ==
=== Top ten finishers ===
The following crews finished the rally in each class's top ten. (Note: Only crews contesting the World Rally Championship, World Rally Championship-2 and World Rally Championship-3 are listed.)

Position		No.	Driver	Co-driver	Entrant	Car	Time	Difference	Points	
Event	Class	No.	Driver	Co-driver	Entrant	Car	Time	Difference	Class	Stage
Overall classification
1	1	1	(France) Sébastien Ogier	(France) Julien Ingrassia	(United Kingdom) M-Sport Ford WRT	Ford Fiesta WRC	3:26:52.7	0.0	25	3
2	2	8	(Estonia) Ott Tänak	(Estonia) Martin Järveoja	(Japan) Toyota Gazoo Racing WRT	Toyota Yaris WRC	3:27:28.8	+36.1	18	1
3	3	5	(Belgium) Thierry Neuville	(Belgium) Nicolas Gilsoul	(South Korea) Hyundai Shell Mobis WRT	Hyundai i20 Coupe WRC	3:28:00.2	+1:07.5	15	0
4	4	6	(Spain) Dani Sordo	(Spain) Carlos del Barrio	(South Korea) Hyundai Shell Mobis WRT	Hyundai i20 Coupe WRC	3:28:55.3	+2:02.6	12	0
5	5	2	(United Kingdom) Elfyn Evans	(United Kingdom) Phil Mills	(United Kingdom) M-Sport Ford WRT	Ford Fiesta WRC	3:28:58.8	+2:06.1	10	0
6	6	9	(Finland) Esapekka Lappi	(Finland) Janne Ferm	(Japan) Toyota Gazoo Racing WRT	Toyota Yaris WRC	3:29:26.2	+2:33.5	8	5
7	7	4	(Norway) Andreas Mikkelsen	(Norway) Anders Jæger-Synnevaag	(South Korea) Hyundai Shell Mobis WRT	Hyundai i20 Coupe WRC	3:29:36.1	+2:43.4	6	0
8	8	31	(Czech Republic) Jan Kopecký	(Czech Republic) Pavel Dresler	(Czech Republic) Škoda Motorsport II	Škoda Fabia R5	3:37:27.5	+10:34.8	4	0
9	9	10	(United Kingdom) Kris Meeke	(Republic of Ireland) Paul Nagle	(France) Citroën Total Abu Dhabi WRT	Citroën C3 WRC	3:37:33.2	+10:40.5	2	2
10	10	40	(France) Yoann Bonato	(France) Benjamin Boulloud	(France) Yoann Bonato	Citroën C3 R5	3:39:18.7	+12:26.0	1	0
World Rally Championship-2
8	1	31	(Czech Republic) Jan Kopecký	(Czech Republic) Pavel Dresler	(Czech Republic) Škoda Motorsport II	Škoda Fabia R5	3:37:27.5	0.0	25	—
10	2	40	(France) Yoann Bonato	(France) Benjamin Boulloud	(France) Yoann Bonato	Citroën C3 R5	3:39:18.7	+1:51.2	18	—
11	3	41	(Italy) Fabio Andolfi	(Italy) Simone Scattolin	(Italy) ACI Team Italia	Škoda Fabia R5	3:40:36.0	+3:08.5	15	—
12	4	33	(Norway) Ole Christian Veiby	(Norway) Stig Rune Skjærmoen	(Czech Republic) Škoda Motorsport II	Škoda Fabia R5	3:40:37.8	+3:10.3	12	—
15	5	37	(Poland) Łukasz Pieniążek	(Poland) Przemysław Mazur	(Finland) Printsport	Škoda Fabia R5	3:50:33.1	+13:05.6	10	—
23	6	39	(France) Pierre-Louis Loubet	(France) Vincent Landais	(Italy) BRC Racing Team	Hyundai i20 R5	4:00:13.0	+22:45.5	8	—
34	7	36	(Spain) Nil Solans	(Spain) Miquel Ibañez Sotos	(Spain) Nil Solans	Ford Fiesta R5	4:10:08.4	+32:40.9	6	—
35	8	32	(Japan) Takamoto Katsuta	(Finland) Marko Salminen	(Finland) Tommi Mäkinen Racing	Ford Fiesta R5	4:10:16.4	+32:48.9	4	—
55	9	35	(Japan) Hiroki Arai	(Australia) Glenn MacNeall	(Finland) Tommi Mäkinen Racing	Ford Fiesta R5	4:22:32.6	+45:05.1	2	—
World Rally Championship-3
18	1	65	(France) Jean-Baptiste Franceschi	(France) Romain Courbon	(France) Jean-Baptiste Franceschi	Ford Fiesta R2T	3:56:28.7	0.0	25	—
19	2	66	(France) Terry Folb	(France) Christopher Guieu	(France) Terry Folb	Ford Fiesta R2T	3:57:02.4	+33.7	18	—
22	3	63	(Sweden) Emil Bergkvist	(Norway) Ola Fløene	(Sweden) Emil Bergkvist	Ford Fiesta R2T	3:59:57.3	+3:28.6	15	—
24	4	61	(Sweden) Dennis Rådström	(Sweden) Johan Johansson	(Sweden) Dennis Rådström	Ford Fiesta R2T	4:00:40.4	+4:11.7	12	—
25	5	67	(Republic of Ireland) Callum Devine	(Republic of Ireland) Keith Moriarty	(Republic of Ireland) Callum Devine	Ford Fiesta R2T	4:02:53.5	+6:24.8	10	—
27	6	71	(Estonia) Ken Torn	(Estonia) Ken Järveoja	(Estonia) OT Racing	Ford Fiesta R2T	4:03:06.5	+6:37.8	8	—
28	7	69	(Italy) Luca Bottarelli	(Italy) Manuel Fenoli	(Italy) ACI Team Italia	Ford Fiesta R2T	4:03:54.3	+7:25.6	6	—
29	8	74	(Turkey) Bugra Banaz	(Turkey) Burak Erdener	(Turkey) Castrol Ford Team Turkiye	Ford Fiesta R2T	4:06:42.6	+10:13.9	4	—
32	9	64	(Germany) Julius Tannert	(Austria) Jürgen Heigl	(Germany) ADAC Sachsen	Ford Fiesta R2T	4:09:25.3	+12:56.6	2	—
36	10	68	(Chile) Emilio Fernández	(Chile) Joaquin Riquelme	(Chile) Emilio Fernández	Ford Fiesta R2T	4:10:23.3	+13:54.6	1	—
Junior World Rally Championship
18	1	65	(France) Jean-Baptiste Franceschi	(France) Romain Courbon	(France) Jean-Baptiste Franceschi	Ford Fiesta R2T	3:56:28.7	0.0	25	8
19	2	66	(France) Terry Folb	(France) Christopher Guieu	(France) Terry Folb	Ford Fiesta R2T	3:57:02.4	+33.7	18	2
22	3	63	(Sweden) Emil Bergkvist	(Norway) Ola Fløene	(Sweden) Emil Bergkvist	Ford Fiesta R2T	3:59:57.3	+3:28.6	15	0
24	4	61	(Sweden) Dennis Rådström	(Sweden) Johan Johansson	(Sweden) Dennis Rådström	Ford Fiesta R2T	4:00:40.4	+4:11.7	12	0
25	5	67	(Republic of Ireland) Callum Devine	(Republic of Ireland) Keith Moriarty	(Republic of Ireland) Callum Devine	Ford Fiesta R2T	4:02:53.5	+6:24.8	10	0
27	6	71	(Estonia) Ken Torn	(Estonia) Ken Järveoja	(Estonia) OT Racing	Ford Fiesta R2T	4:03:06.5	+6:37.8	8	0
28	7	69	(Italy) Luca Bottarelli	(Italy) Manuel Fenoli	(Italy) ACI Team Italia	Ford Fiesta R2T	4:03:54.3	+7:25.6	6	1
29	8	74	(Turkey) Bugra Banaz	(Turkey) Burak Erdener	(Turkey) Castrol Ford Team Turkiye	Ford Fiesta R2T	4:06:42.6	+10:13.9	4	0
32	9	64	(Germany) Julius Tannert	(Austria) Jürgen Heigl	(Germany) ADAC Sachsen	Ford Fiesta R2T	4:09:25.3	+12:56.6	2	0
36	10	68	(Chile) Emilio Fernández	(Chile) Joaquin Riquelme	(Chile) Emilio Fernández	Ford Fiesta R2T	4:10:23.3	+13:54.6	1	0

=== Other notable finishers ===
The following notable crews finished the rally outside top ten.

Position		No.	Driver	Co-driver	Entrant	Car	Class	Time	Points
Event	Class	No.	Driver	Co-driver	Entrant	Car	Class	Time	Stage
14	14	11	(France) Sébastien Loeb	(Monaco) Daniel Elena	(France) Citroën Total Abu Dhabi WRT	Citroën C3 WRC	WRC	3:47:50.7	4
38	11	73	(United Kingdom) Tom Williams	(United Kingdom) Phil Hall	(United Kingdom) Tom Williams	Ford Fiesta R2T	J-WRC	4:11:25.4	0
38	11	73	(United Kingdom) Tom Williams	(United Kingdom) Phil Hall	(United Kingdom) Tom Williams	Ford Fiesta R2T	WRC-3	4:11:25.4	—
39	12	73	(Italy) Enrico Oldrati	(Italy) Danilo Fappani	(Italy) Enrico Oldrati	Ford Fiesta R2T	J-WRC	4:12:14.3	0
39	13	73	(Italy) Enrico Oldrati	(Italy) Danilo Fappani	(Italy) Enrico Oldrati	Ford Fiesta R2T	WRC-3	4:12:14.3	—
45	13	75	(Italy) Umberto Accornero	(Italy) Maurizio Barone	(Italy) Umberto Accornero	Ford Fiesta R2T	J-WRC	4:17:34.2	0
45	13	75	(Italy) Umberto Accornero	(Italy) Maurizio Barone	(Italy) Umberto Accornero	Ford Fiesta R2T	WRC-3	4:17:34.2	—
14	48	62	(Belgium) Amaury Molle	(Belgium) Renaud Herman	(Belgium) Amaury Molle	Peugeot 208 R2	WRC-3	4:20:06.6	—
58	14	70	(New Zealand) David Holder	(New Zealand) Jason Farmer	(New Zealand) David Holder	Ford Fiesta R2T	J-WRC	4:27:57.8	0
58	15	70	(New Zealand) David Holder	(New Zealand) Jason Farmer	(New Zealand) David Holder	Ford Fiesta R2T	WRC-3	4:27:57.8	—

=== Special stages ===
Overall classification
Day	Stage	Name	Length	Winner	Car	Time	Class leader
5 April
5 April	—	Sorbo Ocagnano [Shakedown]	5.45 km	(United Kingdom) Kris Meeke	Citroën C3 WRC	4:00.8	—N/a
6 April
6 April	SS1	La Porta – Valle di Rostino 1	49.03 km	(France) Sébastien Ogier	Ford Fiesta WRC	31:53.8	(France) Sébastien Ogier
6 April	SS2	Piedigriggio – Pont de Castirlia 1	13.55 km	(France) Sébastien Ogier	Ford Fiesta WRC	7:59.9	(France) Sébastien Ogier
6 April	SS3	La Porta – Valle di Rostino 2	49.03 km	(France) Sébastien Ogier	Ford Fiesta WRC	31:44.1	(France) Sébastien Ogier
6 April	SS4	Piedigriggio – Pont de Castirlia 2	13.55 km	(Finland) Esapekka Lappi	Toyota Yaris WRC	7:59.4	(France) Sébastien Ogier
7 April							(France) Sébastien Ogier
7 April	SS5	Cagnano – Pino – Canari 1	35.61 km	(France) Sébastien Loeb	Citroën C3 WRC	21:58.6	(France) Sébastien Ogier
7 April	SS6	Desert des Agriatres 1	15.45 km	(France) Sébastien Loeb	Citroën C3 WRC	8:32.4	(France) Sébastien Ogier
7 April	SS7	Novella 1	17.39 km	(Estonia) Ott Tänak	Toyota Yaris WRC	11:07.7	(France) Sébastien Ogier
7 April	SS8	Cagnano – Pino – Canari 2	35.61 km	(Finland) Esapekka Lappi	Toyota Yaris WRC	21:44.7	(France) Sébastien Ogier
7 April	SS9	Desert des Agriatres 2	15.45 km	(France) Sébastien Loeb	Citroën C3 WRC	8:31.1	(France) Sébastien Ogier
7 April	SS10	Novella 2	17.39 km	(Estonia) Ott Tänak (Finland) Esapekka Lappi	Toyota Yaris WRC; Toyota Yaris WRC	11:07.1	(France) Sébastien Ogier
8 April							(France) Sébastien Ogier
8 April	SS11	Vero – Sarrola – Carcopino	55.17 km	(Estonia) Ott Tänak	Toyota Yaris WRC	33:46.9	(France) Sébastien Ogier
8 April	SS12	Penitencier de Coti-Chiavari [Power stage]	16.25 km	(Finland) Esapekka Lappi	Toyota Yaris WRC	9:41.2	(France) Sébastien Ogier
World Rally Championship-2
5 April
5 April	—	Sorbo Ocagnano [Shakedown]	5.45 km	(France) Stéphane Lefebvre	Citroën C3 R5	4:08.1	—N/a
6 April
6 April	SS1	La Porta – Valle di Rostino 1	49.03 km	(Czech Republic) Jan Kopecký	Škoda Fabia R5	33:52.1	(Czech Republic) Jan Kopecký
6 April	SS2	Piedigriggio – Pont de Castirlia 1	13.55 km	(France) Stéphane Lefebvre	Citroën C3 R5	8:24.5	(Czech Republic) Jan Kopecký
6 April	SS3	La Porta – Valle di Rostino 2	49.03 km	(Czech Republic) Jan Kopecký	Škoda Fabia R5	33:21.5	(Czech Republic) Jan Kopecký
6 April	SS4	Piedigriggio – Pont de Castirlia 2	13.55 km	(France) Stéphane Lefebvre	Citroën C3 R5	8:24.2	(Czech Republic) Jan Kopecký
7 April							(Czech Republic) Jan Kopecký
7 April	SS5	Cagnano – Pino – Canari 1	35.61 km	(Norway) Ole Christian Veiby	Škoda Fabia R5	22:59.3	(Czech Republic) Jan Kopecký
7 April	SS6	Desert des Agriatres 1	15.45 km	(Norway) Ole Christian Veiby	Škoda Fabia R5	8:54.9	(Czech Republic) Jan Kopecký
7 April	SS7	Novella 1	17.39 km	(Czech Republic) Jan Kopecký	Škoda Fabia R5	11:45.5	(Czech Republic) Jan Kopecký
7 April	SS8	Cagnano – Pino – Canari 2	35.61 km	(Czech Republic) Jan Kopecký	Škoda Fabia R5	22:50.5	(Czech Republic) Jan Kopecký
7 April	SS9	Desert des Agriatres 2	15.45 km	(Czech Republic) Jan Kopecký	Škoda Fabia R5	8:55.2	(Czech Republic) Jan Kopecký
7 April	SS10	Novella 2	17.39 km	(Czech Republic) Jan Kopecký	Škoda Fabia R5	11:47.1	(Czech Republic) Jan Kopecký
8 April							(Czech Republic) Jan Kopecký
8 April	SS11	Vero – Sarrola – Carcopino	55.17 km	(Norway) Ole Christian Veiby	Škoda Fabia R5	35:06.5	(Czech Republic) Jan Kopecký
8 April	SS12	Penitencier de Coti-Chiavari	16.25 km	(Norway) Ole Christian Veiby	Škoda Fabia R5	10:10.8	(Czech Republic) Jan Kopecký
World Rally Championship-3 / Junior World Rally Championship
5 April
5 April	—	Sorbo Ocagnano [Shakedown]	5.45 km	(Sweden) Denis Rådström	Ford Fiesta R2T	4:44.6	—N/a
6 April
6 April	SS1	La Porta – Valle di Rostino 1	49.03 km	Stage interrupted			
6 April	SS2	Piedigriggio – Pont de Castirlia 1	13.55 km	(France) Terry Folb	Ford Fiesta R2T	9:14.5	(France) Terry Folb
6 April	SS3	La Porta – Valle di Rostino 2	49.03 km	(France) Terry Folb	Ford Fiesta R2T	36:29.4	(France) Terry Folb
6 April	SS4	Piedigriggio – Pont de Castirlia 2	13.55 km	(France) Jean-Baptiste Franceschi	Ford Fiesta R2T	9:09.2	(France) Terry Folb
7 April							(France) Terry Folb
7 April	SS5	Cagnano – Pino – Canari 1	35.61 km	(France) Jean-Baptiste Franceschi	Ford Fiesta R2T	25:08.6	(France) Terry Folb
7 April	SS6	Desert des Agriatres 1	15.45 km	(France) Jean-Baptiste Franceschi	Ford Fiesta R2T	9:44.7	(France) Terry Folb
7 April	SS7	Novella 1	17.39 km	(France) Jean-Baptiste Franceschi	Ford Fiesta R2T	12:45.0	(France) Jean-Baptiste Franceschi
7 April	SS8	Cagnano – Pino – Canari 2	35.61 km	(France) Jean-Baptiste Franceschi	Ford Fiesta R2T	24:51.4	(France) Jean-Baptiste Franceschi
7 April	SS9	Desert des Agriatres 2	15.45 km	(France) Jean-Baptiste Franceschi	Ford Fiesta R2T	9:39.7	(France) Jean-Baptiste Franceschi
7 April	SS10	Novella 2	17.39 km	(France) Jean-Baptiste Franceschi	Ford Fiesta R2T	12:47.6	(France) Jean-Baptiste Franceschi
8 April							(France) Jean-Baptiste Franceschi
8 April	SS11	Vero – Sarrola – Carcopino	55.17 km	(France) Jean-Baptiste Franceschi	Ford Fiesta R2T	38:26.5	(France) Jean-Baptiste Franceschi
8 April	SS12	Penitencier de Coti-Chiavari	16.25 km	(Italy) Luca Bottarelli	Ford Fiesta R2T	11:14.3	(France) Jean-Baptiste Franceschi

=== Power stage ===
The Power stage was a 16.25 km stage at the end of the rally. Additional World Championship points were awarded to the five fastest crews.

Pos.	Driver	Co-driver	Car	Time	Diff.	Pts.
1	(Finland) Esapekka Lappi	(Finland) Janne Ferm	Toyota Yaris WRC	9:41.2	0.0	5
2	(France) Sébastien Loeb	(Monaco) Daniel Elena	Citroën C3 WRC	9:43.4	+2.2	4
3	(France) Sébastien Ogier	(France) Julien Ingrassia	Ford Fiesta WRC	9:44.6	+3.4	3
4	(United Kingdom) Kris Meeke	(Republic of Ireland) Paul Nagle	Citroën C3 WRC	9:44.6	+3.4	2
5	(Estonia) Ott Tänak	(Estonia) Martin Järveoja	Toyota Yaris WRC	9:49.7	+8.5	1

=== J-WRC stage winning crews ===
Junior World Rally Championship crews scored additional points. Each of the fastest stage time was awarded with one bonus point.

Pos.	Driver	Co-driver	Car	Pts.
1	(France) Jean-Baptiste Franceschi	(France) Romain Courbon	Ford Fiesta R2T	8
2	(France) Terry Folb	(France) Christopher Guieu	Ford Fiesta R2T	2
3	(Italy) Luca Bottarelli	(Italy) Manuel Fenoli	Ford Fiesta R2T	1

=== Penalties ===
The following notable crews were given time penalty during the rally.

Stage	No.	Driver	Co-driver	Entrant	Car	Class	Reason	Penalty
SS18	70	(New Zealand) David Holder	(New Zealand) Jason Farmer	(New Zealand) David Holder	Ford Fiesta R2T	WRC-3, JWRC	2 minutes late	0:20

=== Retirements ===
The following notable crews retired from the event. Under Rally2 regulations, they were eligible to re-enter the event starting from the next leg. Crews that re-entered were given an additional time penalty.

Stage	No.	Driver	Co-driver	Entrant	Car	Class	Cause	Re-entry
SS4	11	(France) Sébastien Loeb	(Monaco) Daniel Elena	(France) Citroën Total Abu Dhabi WRT	Citroën C3 WRC	WRC	Off road	Yes
SS4	32	(Japan) Takamoto Katsuta	(Finland) Marko Salminen	(Finland) Tommi Mäkinen Racing	Ford Fiesta R5	WRC-2	Mechanical	Yes
SS4	36	(Spain) Nil Solans	(Spain) Miquel Ibañez Sotos	(Spain) Nil Solans	Ford Fiesta R5	WRC-2	Mechanical	Yes
SS5	38	(France) Stéphane Lefebvre	(France) Gabin Moreau	(France) Citroën Total Rallye Team	Citroën C3 R5	WRC-2	Accident	No
SS8	3	(France) Bryan Bouffier	(France) Xavier Panseri	(United Kingdom) M-Sport Ford WRT	Ford Fiesta WRC	WRC	Engine	No
SS8	7	(Finland) Jari-Matti Latvala	(Finland) Miikka Anttila	(Japan) Toyota Gazoo Racing WRT	Toyota Yaris WRC	WRC	Accident	No
SS10	10	(United Kingdom) Kris Meeke	(Republic of Ireland) Paul Nagle	(France) Citroën Total Abu Dhabi WRT	Citroën C3 WRC	WRC	Off road	Yes
SS10	35	(Japan) Hiroki Arai	(Australia) Glenn MacNeall	(Finland) Tommi Mäkinen Racing	Ford Fiesta R5	WRC-2	Mechanical	Yes
SS11	42	(France) Nicolas Ciamin	(France) Thibault de la Haye	(France) Nicolas Ciamin	Hyundai i20 R5	WRC-2	Accident	No

=== Championship standings after the rally ===
==== Drivers' championships ====
World Rally Championship
	Pos.	Driver	Points
	1	(France) Sébastien Ogier	84
	2	(Belgium) Thierry Neuville	67
3	3	(Estonia) Ott Tänak	45
1	4	(Norway) Andreas Mikkelsen	41
1	5	(United Kingdom) Kris Meeke	36
World Rally Championship-2
	Pos.	Driver	Points
1	1	(Czech Republic) Jan Kopecký	50
1	2	(Sweden) Pontus Tidemand	43
	3	(Japan) Takamoto Katsuta	29
4	4	(Norway) Ole Christian Veiby	27
1	5	(Italy) Eddie Sciessere	18
World Rally Championship-3
	Pos.	Driver	Points
6	1	(France) Jean-Baptiste Franceschi	37
	2	(Sweden) Denis Rådström	37
2	3	(Sweden) Emil Bergkvist	33
4	4	(France) Terry Folb	28
4	5	(Italy) Enrico Brazzoli	25
Junior World Rally Championship
	Pos.	Driver	Points
	1	(Sweden) Denis Rådström	46
2	2	(France) Jean-Baptiste Franceschi	45
1	3	(Sweden) Emil Bergkvist	38
1	4	(France) Terry Folb	30
1	5	(Republic of Ireland) Callum Devine	18

==== Co-Drivers' championships ====
World Rally Championship
	Pos.	Co-Driver	Points
	1	(France) Julien Ingrassia	84
	2	(Belgium) Nicolas Gilsoul	67
3	3	(Estonia) Martin Järveoja	45
1	4	(Norway) Anders Jæger-Synnevaag	41
1	5	(Republic of Ireland) Paul Nagle	36
World Rally Championship-2
	Pos.	Co-Driver	Points
1	1	(Czech Republic) Pavel Dresler	50
1	2	(Sweden) Jonas Andersson	43
	3	(Finland) Marko Salminen	29
4	4	(Norway) Stig Rune Skjærmoen	27
1	5	(Italy) Flavio Zanella	18
World Rally Championship-3
	Pos.	Co-Driver	Points
6	1	(France) Romain Courbon	37
	2	(Sweden) Johan Johansson	37
2	3	(Norway) Ola Fløene	33
4	4	(France) Christopher Guieu	28
4	5	(Italy) Luca Beltrame	25
Junior World Rally Championship
	Pos.	Co-Driver	Points
	1	(Sweden) Johan Johansson	46
2	2	(France) Romain Courbon	45
1	3	(Norway) Ola Fløene	38
1	4	(France) Christopher Guieu	30
1	5	(Republic of Ireland) Keith Moriarty	18

==== Manufacturers' and teams' championships ====
World Rally Championship
	Pos.	Manufacturer	Points
	1	(South Korea) Hyundai Shell Mobis WRT	111
	2	(United Kingdom) M-Sport Ford WRT	107
1	3	(Japan) Toyota Gazoo Racing WRT	93
1	4	(France) Citroën Total Abu Dhabi WRT	81
World Rally Championship-2
	Pos.	Team	Points
2	1	(Czech Republic) Škoda Motorsport II	50
1	2	(Czech Republic) Škoda Motorsport	43
1	3	(Finland) Tommi Mäkinen Racing	35
2	4	(South Korea) Hyundai Motorsport	30
2	5	(Finland) Printsport	25
World Rally Championship-3
	Pos.	Team	Points
3	1	(Estonia) OT Racing	37
1	2	(Germany) ADAC Sachsen	37
	3	(Italy) ACI Team Italia	33
1	4	(Poland) Go+Cars Atlas Ward	18
	5	(Turkey) Castrol Ford Team Turkiye	15

== Notes ==
Previous rally: 2018 Rally Mexico	2018 FIA World Rally Championship	Next rally: 2018 Rally Argentina
Previous rally: 2017 Tour de Corse	2018 Tour de Corse	Next rally: 2019 Tour de Corse
