= 2019 Monte Carlo Rally =

87th edition of Rallye Automobile Monte-Carlo

2019 Monte Carlo Rally 87^{e} Rallye Automobile Monte-Carlo
Round 1 of 14 in the 2019 World Rally Championship
Next event →
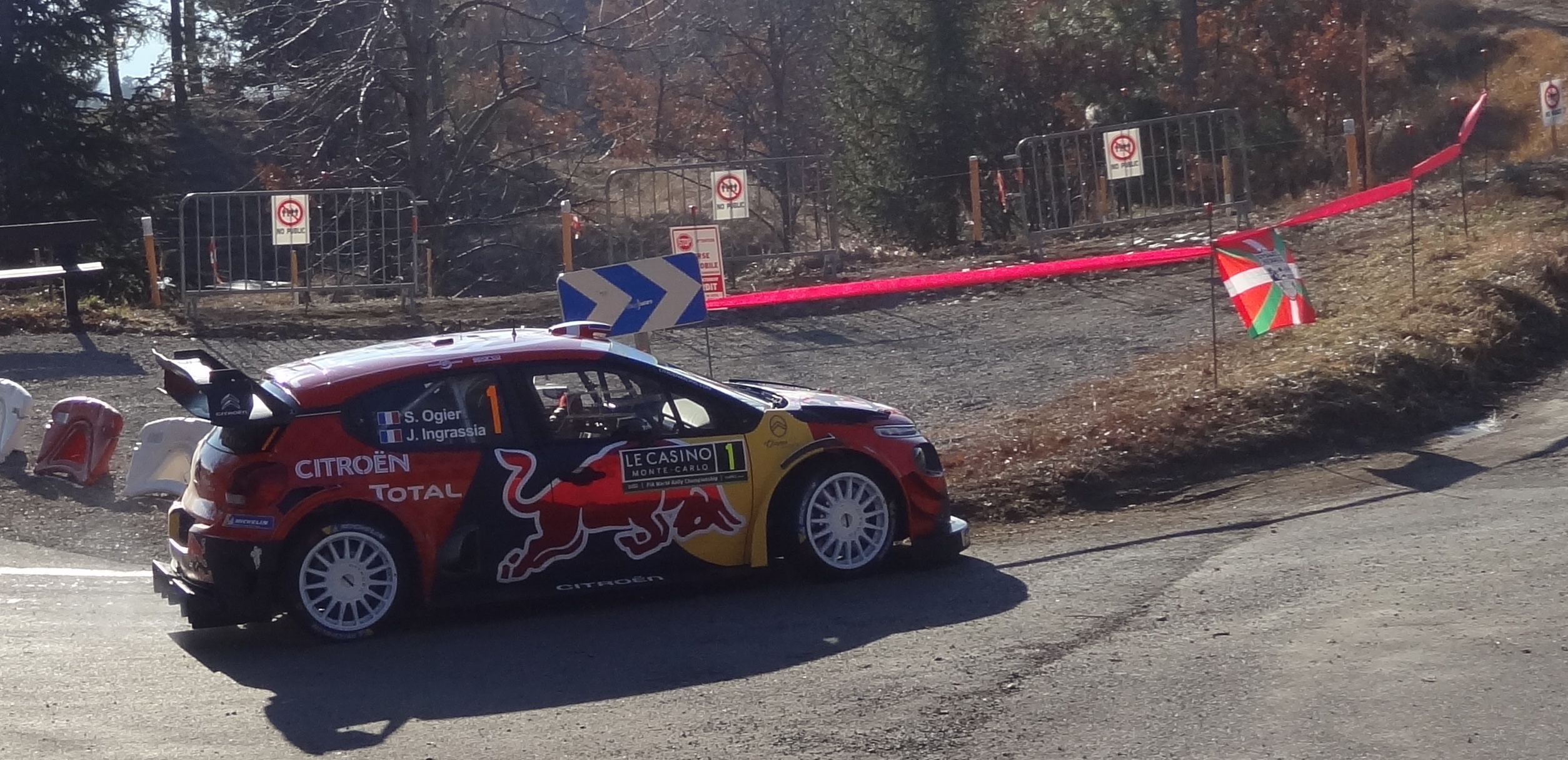
- Sébastien Ogier and Julien Ingrassia won the rally for the sixth time.
- Host country: Monaco (Note: Although the rally is run in France, the Fédération Internationale de l'Automobile does not consider France to be a host nation.)
- Rally base: Gap, Hautes-Alpes
- Dates run: 24 – 27 January 2019
- Start location: Place Desmichels, Gap
- Finish location: Casino Square, Monaco
- Stages: 16 (323.83 km; 201.22 miles)
- Stage surface: Tarmac / Snow
- Transport distance: 1,042.6 km (647.8 miles)
- Overall distance: 1,366.43 km (849.06 miles)

Statistics
- Crews registered: 84
- Crews: 84 at start, 67 at finish

Overall results
- Overall winner: (France) Sébastien Ogier (France) Julien Ingrassia (France) Citroën Total WRT; 3:21:15.9
- Power Stage winner: (United Kingdom) Kris Meeke (United Kingdom) Sebastian Marshall (Japan) Toyota Gazoo Racing WRT

Support category results
- WRC-2 winner: (France) Yoann Bonato (France) Benjamin Boulloud (France) Yoann Bonato; 3:35:12.4

The 2019 Monte Carlo Rally (also known as the 87^{e} Rallye Automobile Monte-Carlo) was a motor racing event for rally cars that was held over four days between 25 and 28 January 2019. It marked the eighty-seventh running of the Monte Carlo Rally, and was the first round of the 2019 World Rally Championship. It was also the first round of the World Rally Championship-2 and the newly created WRC-2 Pro class. The 2019 event was based in the town of Gap in the Hautes-Alpes department of France and consists of sixteen special stages. The rally covered a total competitive distance of 322.81 km (200.58 mi).

Reigning World Drivers' and World Co-Drivers Champions Sébastien Ogier and Julien Ingrassia were the defending rally winners. M-Sport Ford WRT, the team they drove for in 2018, were the defending manufacturers' winners. The Škoda Motorsport crew of Jan Kopecký and Pavel Dresler were the defending winners in the World Rally Championship-2 category, but did not enter the rally. In the World Rally Championship-3 category, Italian privateers Enrico Brazzoli and Luca Beltrame were the reigning rally winners, but did not defend their title as the WRC-3 category was discontinued in 2019. (Note: Brazzoli and Beltrame entered the rally separately; Brazzoli in a Group R-GT and Beltrame in a privately-entered pre-2017 World Rally Car.)

Ogier and Ingrassia successfully defended their titles. Their team, Citroën World Rally Team, were the manufacturers' winners. The victory also marked the 100th world rally success for the French manufacturer. The M-Sport Ford WRT crew of Gus Greensmith and Elliott Edmondson became the first crew to win an event in the WRC-2 Pro category, while Yoann Bonato and Benjamin Boulloud won the wider WRC-2 class, finishing second in the combined WRC-2 category.

== Background ==
=== Entry list ===
The following crews are entered into the rally. The event is open to crews competing in the World Rally Championship, World Rally Championship-2 and WRC-2 Pro, the FIA R-GT Cup, and privateer entries not registered to score points in any championship. Eighty-four crews registered to compete, including eleven competing with World Rally Cars and eleven in World Rally Championship-2. Three of these crews were nominated to score points in the WRC-2 Pro class, but one withdrew before the rally and the crew became a regular WRC-2 entrant.

| No. | Driver | Co-Driver | Entrant | Car | Tyre |
|---|---|---|---|---|---|
World Rally Car entries
| 1 | (France) Sébastien Ogier | (France) Julien Ingrassia | (France) Citroën Total WRT | Citroën C3 WRC | MI |
| 3 | (Finland) Teemu Suninen | (Finland) Marko Salminen | (United Kingdom) M-Sport Ford WRT | Ford Fiesta WRC | MI |
| 4 | (Finland) Esapekka Lappi | (Finland) Janne Ferm | (France) Citroën Total WRT | Citroën C3 WRC | MI |
| 5 | (United Kingdom) Kris Meeke | (United Kingdom) Sebastian Marshall | (Japan) Toyota Gazoo Racing WRT | Toyota Yaris WRC | MI |
| 7 | (Sweden) Pontus Tidemand | (Norway) Ola Fløene | (United Kingdom) M-Sport Ford WRT | Ford Fiesta WRC | MI |
| 8 | (Estonia) Ott Tänak | (Estonia) Martin Järveoja | (Japan) Toyota Gazoo Racing WRT | Toyota Yaris WRC | MI |
| 10 | (Finland) Jari-Matti Latvala | (Finland) Miikka Anttila | (Japan) Toyota Gazoo Racing WRT | Toyota Yaris WRC | MI |
| 11 | (Belgium) Thierry Neuville | (Belgium) Nicolas Gilsoul | (South Korea) Hyundai Shell Mobis WRT | Hyundai i20 Coupe WRC | MI |
| 19 | (France) Sébastien Loeb | (Monaco) Daniel Elena | (South Korea) Hyundai Shell Mobis WRT | Hyundai i20 Coupe WRC | MI |
| 33 | (United Kingdom) Elfyn Evans | (United Kingdom) Scott Martin | (United Kingdom) M-Sport Ford WRT | Ford Fiesta WRC | MI |
| 89 | (Norway) Andreas Mikkelsen | (Norway) Anders Jæger-Synnevaag | (South Korea) Hyundai Shell Mobis WRT | Hyundai i20 Coupe WRC | MI |
World Rally Championship-2 Pro entries
| 21 | (United Kingdom) Gus Greensmith | (United Kingdom) Elliott Edmondson | (United Kingdom) M-Sport Ford WRT | Ford Fiesta R5 | MI |
| 30 | (Finland) Kalle Rovanperä | (Finland) Jonne Halttunen | (Czech Republic) Škoda Motorsport (Note: Entry run in conjunction with TGS Worldwide.) | Škoda Fabia R5 | MI |
World Rally Championship-2 entries
| 22 | (France) Yoann Bonato | (France) Benjamin Boulloud | (France) Yoann Bonato (Note: Entry operated by CHL Sport Auto.) (Note: Initially entered in the WRC-2 pro class.) | Citroën C3 R5 | MI |
| 23 | (Norway) Ole Christian Veiby | (Sweden) Jonas Andersson | (Norway) Ole Christian Veiby (Note: Entry operated by BRR Baumschlager Rallye & Racing.) | Volkswagen Polo GTI R5 | MI |
| 24 | (France) Nicolas Ciamin | (France) Yannick Roche | (France) Nicolas Ciamin (Note: Entry operated by THX Racing.) | Volkswagen Polo GTI R5 | MI |
| 25 | (Belgium) Guillaume De Mevius | (Belgium) Martijn Wydaeghe | (Belgium) Guillaume De Mevius (Note: Entry operated by DG Sport.) | Citroën C3 R5 | MI |
| 26 | (France) Adrien Fourmaux | (Belgium) Renaud Jamoul | (France) Adrien Fourmaux (Note: Entry operated by Team France FFSA Rallye.) | Ford Fiesta R5 | MI |
| 27 | (Luxembourg) Grégoire Munster | (Belgium) Louis Louka | (Luxembourg) Grégoire Munster | Škoda Fabia R5 | P |
| 28 | (Italy) "Pedro" (Note: Pseudonym of Massimo Pedretti.) | (Italy) Emanuele Baldaccini | (Italy) "Pedro" | Hyundai i20 R5 | P |
| 29 | (United Kingdom) Rhys Yates | (France) Denis Giraudet | (United Kingdom) Rhys Yates | Škoda Fabia R5 | P |
| 35 | (Italy) Manuel Villa | (Italy) Luca Beltrame | (Italy) Manuel Villa | Škoda Fabia R5 | P |
Other major entries
| 20 | (Italy) Mauro Miele | (Italy) Luca Beltrame | (Italy) Mauro Miele (Note: Entry operated by Dream One Racing.) | Citroën DS3 WRC | MI |
| 31 | (Japan) Takamoto Katsuta | (United Kingdom) Daniel Barritt | (Finland) Tommi Mäkinen Racing | Ford Fiesta R5 | P |
| 34 | (France) Stéphane Sarrazin | (France) Jacques-Julien Renucci | (France) Stéphane Sarrazin | Hyundai i20 R5 | P |
| 50 | (France) "Hervé Knapick" (Note: Pseudonym of Hervé Lemonnier.) | (France) Marie-Laure Lemonnier-Peu | (France) "Hervé Knapick" | Citroën DS3 R5 | P |

=== Route ===
The rally route is made up of 323.83 km (201.22 mi) in competitive stages, making the 2019 route the shortest since the 2004 event. The route will be 71.93 km (44.7 mi) shorter than the one used in 2018. The Thoard — Sisteron and Bayons — Bréziers were removed from the itinerary and replaced by a new stage from La Bréole to Selonnet and the revival of the Avançon — Notre-Dame-du-Laus stage, which had not been contested for a decade. The opening day's stages were also revised to be better-centred around the rally base in Gap. The second and third leg of the rally were unchanged from the 2018 event. The route was revised after the Fédération Internationale de l'Automobile introduced rule changes for the 2019 championship that limited the maximum distance of a route to 350 km (217.5 mi).

==== Itinerary ====
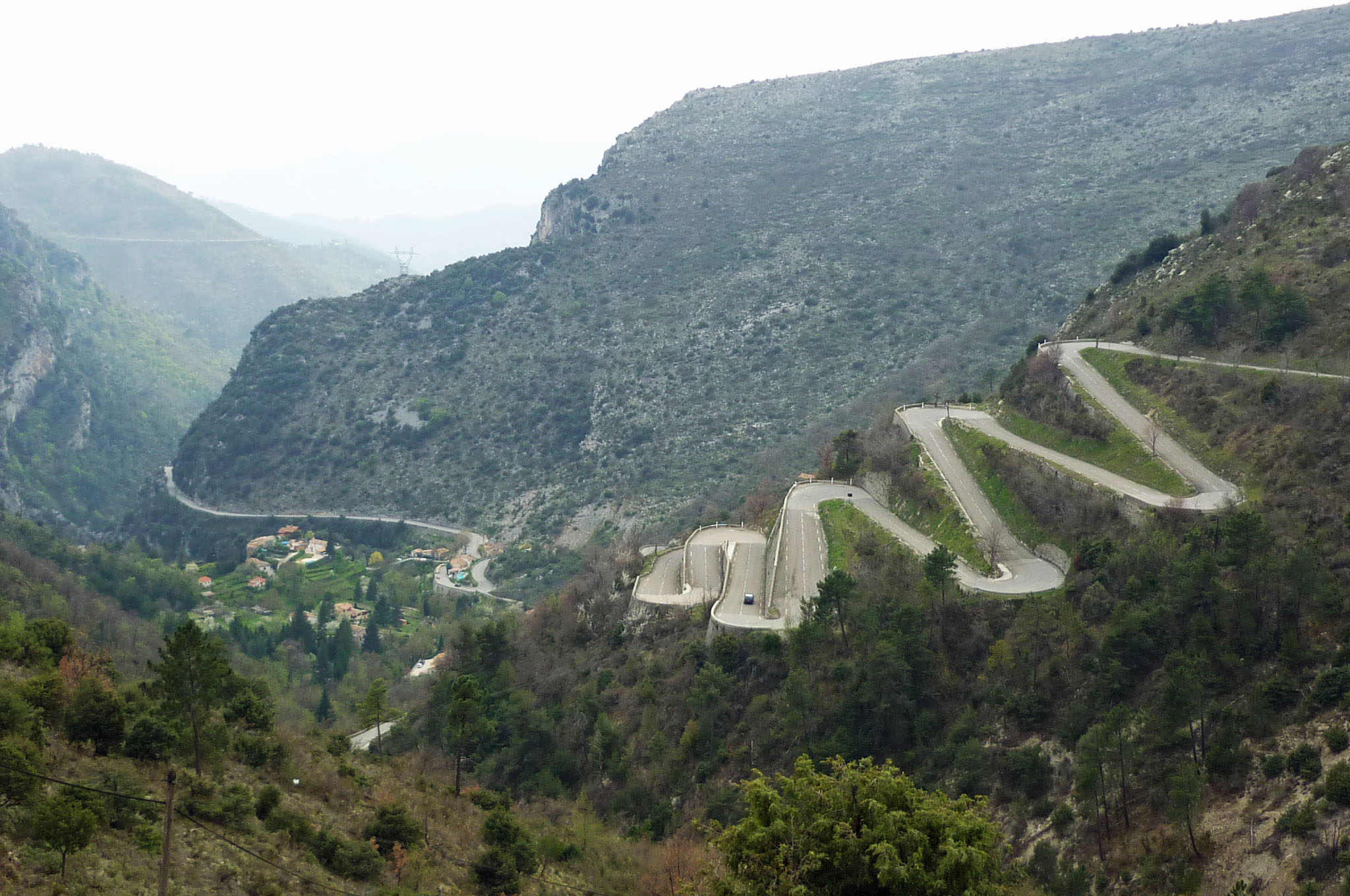
The Col de Braus mountain pass will be contested as the rally's Power Stage.

All dates and times are CET (UTC+1).

| Date | Time | No. | Stage name | Distance |
|---|---|---|---|---|
| 24 January | 10:00 | — | Gap [Shakedown] | 3.35 km |
Leg 1 — 166.47 km
| 24 January | 19:38 | SS1 | La Bréole — Selonnet | 20.76 km |
| 24 January | 20:41 | SS2 | Avançon — Notre-Dame-du-Laus | 20.59 km |
| 25 January | 9:11 | SS3 | Valdrôme — Sigottier 1 | 20.04 km |
| 25 January | 10:14 | SS4 | Roussieux — Laborel 1 | 24.05 km |
| 25 January | 11:37 | SS5 | Curbans — Piégut 1 | 18.47 km |
| 25 January | 14:23 | SS6 | Valdrôme — Sigottier 2 | 20.04 km |
| 25 January | 15:26 | SS7 | Roussieux — Laborel 2 | 24.05 km |
| 25 January | 16:49 | SS8 | Curbans — Piégut 2 | 18.47 km |
Leg 2 — 93.38 km
| 26 January | 8:48 | SS9 | Agnières-en-Dévoluy — Corps 1 | 29.82 km |
| 26 January | 10:46 | SS10 | St.-Leger-les-Mélèzes — La-Bâtie-Neuve 1 | 16.87 km |
| 26 January | 12:47 | SS11 | Agnières-en-Dévoluy — Corps 2 | 29.82 km |
| 26 January | 14:08 | SS12 | St.-Leger-les-Mélèzes — La-Bâtie-Neuve 2 | 16.87 km |
Leg 3 — 63.98 km
| 27 January | 8:20 | SS13 | La Bollène-Vésubie — Peïra Cava 1 | 18.41 km |
| 27 January | 9:08 | SS14 | La Cabanette — Col de Braus 1 | 13.58 km |
| 27 January | 10:55 | SS15 | La Bollène-Vésubie — Peïra Cava 2 | 18.41 km |
| 27 January | 12:18 | SS16 | La Cabanette — Col de Braus 2 [Power Stage] | 13.58 km |

== Report ==
=== World Rally Cars ===
Ott Tänak and Martin Järveoja took the early lead during the first two night stages. However, their lead was short-lived as Thierry Neuville and Nicolas Gilsoul moved to the front after the cancellation of the third stage. Sébastien Ogier and Julien Ingrassia then took over the rally as the Belgian crew missed a junction. Eventually, the six-time world champions won the rally for the sixth time in a row. Neuville and Gilsoul were second, 2.2 seconds behind Ogier and Ingrassia, thus making 2019 the closest finish to the Monte Carlo Rally in history. The previous closest finish was the 1979 edition, with Bernard Darniche winning by just 6.6 seconds over Björn Waldegård.

==== Classification ====
| Position | | No. | Driver | Co-driver | Entrant | Car | Time | Difference | Points | |
| Event | Class | No. | Driver | Co-driver | Entrant | Car | Time | Difference | Event | Stage |
|---|---|---|---|---|---|---|---|---|---|---|
| 1 | 1 | 1 | Sébastien Ogier | Julien Ingrassia | Citroën Total WRT | Citroën C3 WRC | 3:21:15.9 | 0.0 | 25 | 4 |
| 2 | 2 | 11 | Thierry Neuville | Nicolas Gilsoul | Hyundai Shell Mobis WRT | Hyundai i20 Coupe WRC | 3:21:18.1 | +2.2 | 18 | 3 |
| 3 | 3 | 8 | Ott Tänak | Martin Järveoja | Toyota Gazoo Racing WRT | Toyota Yaris WRC | 3:23:31.1 | +2:15.2 | 15 | 2 |
| 4 | 4 | 19 | Sébastien Loeb | Daniel Elena | Hyundai Shell Mobis WRT | Hyundai i20 Coupe WRC | 3:23:44.1 | +2:28.2 | 12 | 0 |
| 5 | 5 | 10 | Jari-Matti Latvala | Miikka Anttila | Toyota Gazoo Racing WRT | Toyota Yaris WRC | 3:23:45.8 | +2:29.9 | 10 | 0 |
| 6 | 6 | 5 | Kris Meeke | Sebastian Marshall | Toyota Gazoo Racing WRT | Toyota Yaris WRC | 3:26:52.1 | +5:36.2 | 8 | 5 |
| 11 | 7 | 3 | Teemu Suninen | Marko Salminen | M-Sport Ford WRT | Ford Fiesta WRC | 3:39:12.7 | +17:56.8 | 0 | 1 |
| 20 | 8 | 7 | Pontus Tidemand | Ola Fløene | M-Sport Ford WRT | Ford Fiesta WRC | 3:50:50.5 | +29:34.6 | 0 | 0 |
| Retired SS10 | | 33 | Elfyn Evans | Scott Martin | M-Sport Ford WRT | Ford Fiesta WRC | Accident | | 0 | 0 |
| Retired SS10 | | 89 | Andreas Mikkelsen | Anders Jæger-Synnevaag | Hyundai Shell Mobis WRT | Hyundai i20 Coupe WRC | Lost wheel | | 0 | 0 |
| Retired SS9 | | 4 | Esapekka Lappi | Janne Ferm | Citroën Total WRT | Citroën C3 WRC | Engine | | 0 | 0 |

==== Special stages ====
| Day | Stage | Stage name | Length | Winners | Car | Time | Class leaders |
|---|---|---|---|---|---|---|---|
| 24 January | — | Gap [Shakedown] | 3.35 km | Meeke / Marshall | Toyota Yaris WRC | 1:56.8 | —N/a |
| 24 January | SS1 | La Bréole — Selonnet | 20.76 km | Tänak / Järveoja | Toyota Yaris WRC | 13:02.0 | Tänak / Järveoja |
| 24 January | SS2 | Avançon — Notre-Dame-du-Laus | 20.59 km | Neuville / Gilsoul | Hyundai i20 Coupe WRC | 13:18.5 | Tänak / Järveoja |
| 25 January | SS3 | Valdrôme — Sigottier 1 | 20.04 km | Stage cancelled (Note: SS3 cancelled due to safety reasons when spectator areas became overcrowded.) | | | |
| 25 January | SS4 | Roussieux — Laborel 1 | 24.05 km | Loeb / Elena | Hyundai i20 Coupe WRC | 14:42.1 | Neuville / Gilsoul |
| 25 January | SS5 | Curbans — Piégut 1 | 18.47 km | Ogier / Ingrassia | Citroën C3 WRC | 13:49.1 | Neuville / Gilsoul |
| 25 January | SS6 | Valdrôme — Sigottier 2 | 20.04 km | Ogier / Ingrassia; Latvala / Anttila | Citroën C3 WRC; Toyota Yaris WRC | 13:39.5 | Neuville / Gilsoul |
| 25 January | SS7 | Roussieux — Laborel 2 | 24.05 km | Loeb / Elena | Hyundai i20 Coupe WRC | 14:26.6 | Ogier/Ingrassia |
| 25 January | SS8 | Curbans — Piégut 2 | 18.47 km | Neuville / Gilsoul | Hyundai i20 Coupe WRC | 13:25.5 | Ogier/Ingrassia |
| 26 January | SS9 | Agnières-en-Dévoluy — Corps 1 | 29.82 km | Tänak / Järveoja | Toyota Yaris WRC | 20:54.0 | Ogier/Ingrassia |
| 26 January | SS10 | St-Léger-les-Mélèzes — La Bâtie-Neuve 1 | 16.87 km | Tänak / Järveoja | Toyota Yaris WRC | 10:12.1 | Ogier/Ingrassia |
| 26 January | SS11 | Agnières-en-Dévoluy — Corps 2 | 29.82 km | Tänak / Järveoja | Toyota Yaris WRC | 19:54.5 | Ogier/Ingrassia |
| 26 January | SS12 | St-Léger-les-Mélèzes — La Bâtie-Neuve 2 | 16.87 km | Tänak / Järveoja | Toyota Yaris WRC | 9:53.2 | Ogier/Ingrassia |
| 27 January | SS13 | La Bollène Vésubie - Peïra Cava 1 | 18.41 km | Tänak / Järveoja | Toyota Yaris WRC | 11:40.3 | Ogier/Ingrassia |
| 27 January | SS14 | La Cabarette - Col de Braus 1 | 13.58 km | Tänak / Järveoja | Toyota Yaris WRC | 9:52.4 | Ogier/Ingrassia |
| 27 January | SS15 | La Bollène Vésubie - Peïra Cava 2 | 18.41 km | Neuville / Gilsoul | Hyundai i20 Coupe WRC | 11:25.5 | Ogier/Ingrassia |
| 27 January | SS16 | La Cabarette - Col de Braus 2 [Power Stage] | 13.58 km | Meeke / Marshall | Toyota Yaris WRC | 9:37.3 | Ogier/Ingrassia |

==== Championship standings ====
| Pos. | Drivers' championships | | | Co-drivers' championships | | | Manufacturers' championships | | |
| Pos. | Move | Driver | Points | Move | Co-driver | Points | Move | Manufacturer | Points |
|---|---|---|---|---|---|---|---|---|---|
| 1 | | Sébastien Ogier | 29 | | Julien Ingrassia | 29 | | Hyundai Shell Mobis WRT | 30 |
| 2 | | Thierry Neuville | 21 | | Nicolas Gilsoul | 21 | | Citroën Total WRT | 25 |
| 3 | | Ott Tänak | 17 | | Martin Järveoja | 17 | | Toyota Gazoo Racing WRT | 25 |
| 4 | | Kris Meeke | 13 | | Sebastian Marshall | 13 | | M-Sport Ford WRT | 14 |
| 5 | | Sébastien Loeb | 12 | | Daniel Elena | 12 | | | |

=== World Rally Championship-2 Pro ===
==== Classification ====
| Position | | No. | Driver | Co-driver | Entrant | Car | Time | Difference | Points | |
| Event | Class | No. | Driver | Co-driver | Entrant | Car | Time | Difference | Class | Event |
|---|---|---|---|---|---|---|---|---|---|---|
| 7 | 1 | 21 | Gus Greensmith | Elliott Edmondson | M-Sport Ford WRT | Ford Fiesta R5 | 3:34:20.5 | 0.0 | **25** | **6** |
| 18 | 2 | 30 | Kalle Rovanperä | Jonne Halttunen | Škoda Motorsport | Škoda Fabia R5 | 3:47:48.3 | +13:27.8 | **18** | **0** |

==== Special stages ====
Results in bold denote first in the RC2 class, the class which both the WRC-2 Pro and WRC-2 championships run to.

| Day | Stage | Stage name | Length | Winners | Car | Time | Class leaders |
|---|---|---|---|---|---|---|---|
| 24 January | — | Gap [Shakedown] | 3.35 km | Rovanperä / Halttunen | Škoda Fabia R5 | 2:04.9 | —N/a |
| 24 January | SS1 | La Bréole — Selonnet | 20.76 km | Greensmith / Edmondson | Ford Fiesta R5 | 14:28.9 | Greensmith / Edmondson |
| 24 January | SS2 | Avançon — Notre-Dame-du-Laus | 20.59 km | Greensmith / Edmondson | Ford Fiesta R5 | 14:41.1 | Greensmith / Edmondson |
| 25 January | SS3 | Valdrôme — Sigottier 1 | 20.04 km | Stage cancelled | | | |
| 25 January | SS4 | Roussieux — Laborel 1 | 24.05 km | Rovanperä / Halttunen (Note: The winner of SS4 in the RC2 class was the non-championship crew of Stéphane Sarrazin and Jacques-Julien Renucci, where they set 15:57.8.) | Škoda Fabia R5 | 15:57.8 | Greensmith / Edmondson |
| 25 January | SS5 | Curbans — Piégut 1 | 18.47 km | **Rovanperä / Halttunen** | Škoda Fabia R5 | 14:37.3 | Greensmith / Edmondson |
| 25 January | SS6 | Valdrôme — Sigottier 2 | 20.04 km | **Rovanperä / Halttunen** | Škoda Fabia R5 | 14:11.6 | Greensmith / Edmondson |
| 25 January | SS7 | Roussieux — Laborel 2 | 24.05 km | **Greensmith / Edmondson** | Ford Fiesta R5 | 15:17.8 | Greensmith / Edmondson |
| 25 January | SS8 | Curbans — Piégut 2 | 18.47 km | **Rovanperä / Halttunen** | Škoda Fabia R5 | 13:58.3 | Greensmith / Edmondson |
| 26 January | SS9 | Agnières-en-Dévoluy — Corps 1 | 29.82 km | **Greensmith / Edmondson** | Ford Fiesta R5 | 21:56.1 | Greensmith / Edmondson |
| 26 January | SS10 | St-Léger-les-Mélèzes — La Bâtie-Neuve 1 | 16.87 km | **Greensmith / Edmondson**; **Rovanperä / Halttunen** | Ford Fiesta R5; Škoda Fabia R5 | 10:57.8 | Greensmith / Edmondson |
| 26 January | SS11 | Agnières-en-Dévoluy — Corps 2 | 29.82 km | **Rovanperä / Halttunen** | Škoda Fabia R5 | 20:38.4 | Greensmith / Edmondson |
| 26 January | SS12 | St-Léger-les-Mélèzes — La Bâtie-Neuve 2 | 16.87 km | **Greensmith / Edmondson** | Ford Fiesta R5 | 10:30.9 | Greensmith / Edmondson |
| 27 January | SS13 | La Bollène-Vésubie — Peïra-Cava 1 | 18.41 km | Rovanperä / Halttunen | Škoda Fabia R5 | 12:19.9 | Greensmith / Edmondson |
| 27 January | SS14 | La Cabanette — Col de Braus 1 | 13.58 km | Rovanperä / Halttunen | Škoda Fabia R5 | 10:15.7 | Greensmith / Edmondson |
| 27 January | SS15 | La Bollène-Vésubie — Peïra-Cava 2 | 18.41 km | Rovanperä / Halttunen | Škoda Fabia R5 | 12:01.4 | Greensmith / Edmondson |
| 27 January | SS16 | La Cabanette — Col de Braus 1 | 13.58 km | Rovanperä / Halttunen | Škoda Fabia R5 | 10:07.2 | Greensmith / Edmondson |

==== Championship standings ====
| Pos. | Drivers' championships | | | Co-drivers' championships | | | Manufacturers' championships | | |
| Pos. | Move | Driver | Points | Move | Co-driver | Points | Move | Manufacturer | Points |
|---|---|---|---|---|---|---|---|---|---|
| 1 | | Gus Greensmith | 25 | | Elliott Edmondson | 25 | | M-Sport Ford WRT | 25 |
| 2 | | Kalle Rovanperä | 18 | | Jonne Halttunen | 18 | | Škoda Motorsport | 18 |

=== World Rally Championship-2 ===
==== Classification ====
| Position | | No. | Driver | Co-driver | Entrant | Car | Time | Difference | Points | |
| Event | Class | No. | Driver | Co-driver | Entrant | Car | Time | Difference | Class | Event |
|---|---|---|---|---|---|---|---|---|---|---|
| 8 | 1 | 22 | Yoann Bonato | Benjamin Boulloud | Yoann Bonato | Citroën C3 R5 | 3:35:12.4 | 0.0 | 25 | 4 |
| 10 | 2 | 26 | Adrien Fourmaux | Renaud Jamoul | Adrien Fourmaux | Ford Fiesta R5 | 3:37:19.3 | +2:06.9 | 18 | 1 |
| 12 | 3 | 23 | Ole Christian Veiby | Jonas Andersson | Ole Christian Veiby | Volkswagen Polo GTI R5 | 3:39:29.1 | +4:16.7 | 15 | 0 |
| 14 | 4 | 29 | Rhys Yates | Denis Giraudet | Rhys Yates | Škoda Fabia R5 | 3:42:10.8 | +6:58.4 | 12 | 0 |
| 16 | 5 | 24 | Nicolas Ciamin | Yannick Roche | Nicolas Ciamin | Volkswagen Polo GTI R5 | 3:43:33.2 | +8:20.8 | 10 | 0 |
| 24 | 6 | 35 | Manuel Villa | Daniele Michi | Manuel Villa | Škoda Fabia R5 | 3:55:18.5 | +20:06.1 | 8 | 0 |
| Retired SS14 | | 25 | Guillaume De Mevius | Martijn Wydaeghe | Guillaume De Mevius | Citroën C3 R5 | Accident | | 0 | 0 |
| Retired SS12 | | 28 | "Pedro" | Emanuele Baldaccini | Daytona Race | Hyundai i20 R5 | Accident | | 0 | 0 |
| Retired SS11 | | 27 | Grégoire Munster | Louis Louka | Grégoire Munster | Škoda Fabia R5 | Accident | | 0 | 0 |

==== Special stages ====
Results in bold denote first in the RC2 class, the class which both the WRC-2 Pro and WRC-2 championships run to.

| Day | Stage | Stage name | Length | Winners | Car | Time | Class leaders |
|---|---|---|---|---|---|---|---|
| 24 January | — | Gap [Shakedown] | 3.35 km | Veiby / Andersson | Volkswagen Polo GTI R5 | 2:07.8 | —N/a |
| 24 January | SS1 | La Bréole — Selonnet | 20.76 km | **Bonato / Boulloud** | Citroën C3 R5 | 14:02.8 | Bonato / Boulloud |
| 24 January | SS2 | Avançon — Notre-Dame-du-Laus | 20.59 km | **de Mevius / Wydaeghe** | Citroën C3 R5 | 14:24.8 | Bonato / Boulloud |
| 25 January | SS3 | Valdrôme — Sigottier 1 | 20.04 km | Stage cancelled | | | |
| 25 January | SS4 | Roussieux — Laborel 1 | 24.05 km | Bonato / Boulloud | Citroën C3 R5 | 16:07.6 | Bonato / Boulloud |
| 25 January | SS5 | Curbans — Piégut 1 | 18.47 km | Bonato / Boulloud | Citroën C3 R5 | 14:45.4 | Bonato / Boulloud |
| 25 January | SS6 | Valdrôme — Sigottier 2 | 20.04 km | Bonato / Boulloud | Citroën C3 R5 | 14:19.6 | Bonato / Boulloud |
| 25 January | SS7 | Roussieux — Laborel 2 | 24.05 km | Ciamin / Roche | Volkswagen Polo GTI R5 | 15:36.1 | Bonato / Boulloud |
| 25 January | SS8 | Curbans — Piégut 2 | 18.47 km | Formaux / Jamoul | Ford Fiesta R5 | 14:21.1 | Bonato / Boulloud |
| 26 January | SS9 | Agnières-en-Dévoluy — Corps 1 | 29.82 km | Bonato / Boulloud | Citroën C3 R5 | 22:04.8 | Bonato / Boulloud |
| 26 January | SS10 | St-Léger-les-Mélèzes — La Bâtie-Neuve 1 | 16.87 km | de Mevius / Wydaeghe | Citroën C3 R5 | 11:01.2 | Bonato / Boulloud |
| 26 January | SS11 | Agnières-en-Dévoluy — Corps 2 | 29.82 km | Bonato / Boulloud | Citroën C3 R5 | 20:54.2 | Bonato / Boulloud |
| 26 January | SS12 | St-Léger-les-Mélèzes — La Bâtie-Neuve 2 | 16.87 km | de Mevius / Wydaeghe | Citroën C3 R5 | 10:31.8 | Bonato / Boulloud |
| 27 January | SS13 | La Bollène-Vésubie — Peïra-Cava 1 | 18.41 km | **Ciamin / Roche** | Volkswagen Polo GTI R5 | 12:07.1 | Bonato / Boulloud |
| 27 January | SS14 | La Cabanette — Col de Braus 1 | 13.58 km | **Ciamin / Roche** | Volkswagen Polo GTI R5 | 10:07.6 | Bonato / Boulloud |
| 27 January | SS15 | La Bollène-Vésubie — Peïra-Cava 2 | 18.41 km | **Ciamin / Roche** | Volkswagen Polo GTI R5 | 11:56.3 | Bonato / Boulloud |
| 27 January | SS16 | La Cabanette — Col de Braus 1 | 13.58 km | **Ciamin / Roche** | Volkswagen Polo GTI R5 | 9:59.2 | Bonato / Boulloud |

==== Championship standings ====
| Pos. | Drivers' championships | | | Co-drivers' championships | | |
| Pos. | Move | Driver | Points | Move | Co-driver | Points |
|---|---|---|---|---|---|---|
| 1 | | Yoann Bonato | 25 | | Benjamin Boulloud | 25 |
| 2 | | Adrien Fourmaux | 18 | | Renaud Jamoul | 18 |
| 3 | | Ole Christian Veiby | 15 | | Jonas Andersson | 15 |
| 4 | | Rhys Yates | 12 | | Denis Giraudet | 12 |
| 5 | | Nicolas Ciamin | 10 | | Yannick Roche | 10 |

== Notes ==
| Previous rally: 2018 Rally Australia (2018) | 2019 FIA World Rally Championship | Next rally: 2019 Rally Sweden |
| Previous rally: 2018 Monte Carlo Rally | 2019 Monte Carlo Rally | Next rally: 2020 Monte Carlo Rally |
