= Yoann Bonato =

French rally driver (born 1983)

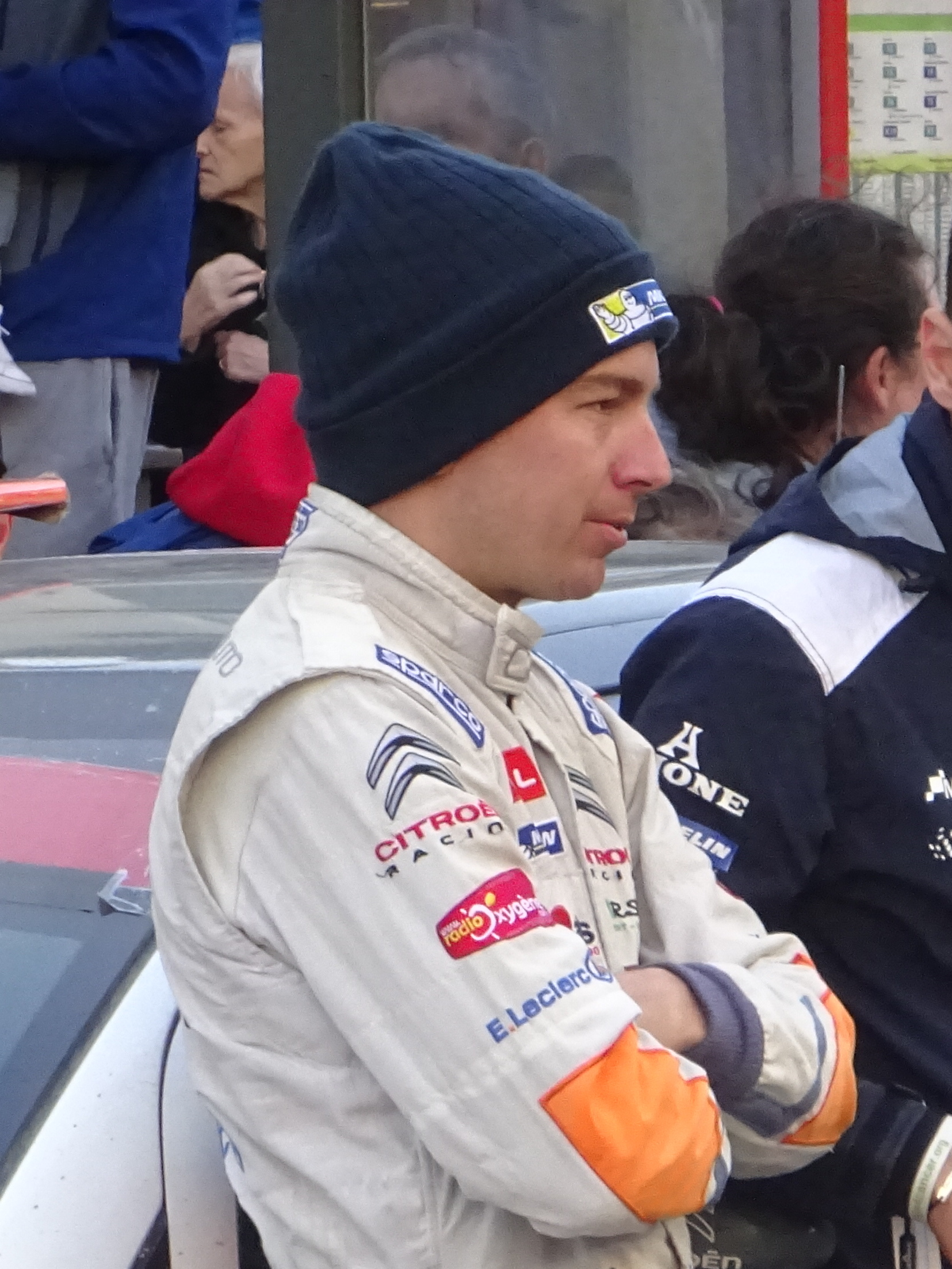
- Yoann Bonato at the 2017 Wales Rally GB

Personal information
- Nationality: (France) French
- Born: 13 May 1983 (age 43); Saint-Martin-d'Hères, Isère, France

World Rally Championship record
- Years active: 2006–2007, 2009, 2016–2021
- Co-driver: (France) Benjamin Boulloud (France) Denis Giraudet
- Rallies: 30
- Championships: 0
- Rally wins: 0
- Podiums: 0
- Stage wins: 0
- Total points: 4
- First rally: 2006 Tour de Corse
- Last rally: 2021 Monte Carlo Rally

Yoann Bonato (born 13 May 1983) is a French rally driver. He currently competes in the French Rally Championship and the WRC-2, the premier support category of the World Rally Championship, with customer Citroën team CHL Sport Auto. He also works as a development driver for Citroën's in-house customer support team PH Sport. Bonato won the French Rally Championship outright in 2017, 2018 and 2020, earning the title of "Champion of France."

After winning the French Rally Championship in 2017, PH Sport hired Bonato to be part of a team of drivers that would help Citroën develop a new R5 variant of their WRC car, the Citroën C3. Bonato gave the car its first full rally-spec test at the closing event of the French Championship Rallye du Var, as a Course Car. He, along with factory Citroën driver Stéphane Lefebvre, would give the C3 its competitive debut at the Tour de Corse the following year.

Bonato's co-driver since the beginning of his career is Benjamin Boulloud.

== Rally results ==
=== Complete WRC results ===
Year	Entrant	Car	1	2	3	4	5	6	7	8	9	10	11	12	13	14	15	16	WDC	Points
2006	Yoann Bonato	Renault Clio S1600	MON	SWE	MEX	ESP	FRA; 32	ARG	ITA	GRE	GER	FIN	JPN	CYP	TUR	AUS	NZL	GBR	NC	0
2007	PH Sport	Citroën C2 R2	MON	SWE	NOR	MEX	POR	ARG	ITA	GRE	FIN; 33	GER; 30	NZL	ESP; 32	FRA; 19	JPN	IRE	GBR	NC	0
2009	Yoann Bonato	Suzuki Swift S1600	IRE; 20	NOR	CYP	POR; Ret	ARG	ITA; 19	GRE	POL; 16	FIN; Ret	AUS	ESP	GBR					NC	0
2016	CHL Sport Auto	Citroën DS3 R5	MON; 15	SWE	MEX	ARG	POR; 16	ITA	POL; Ret	FIN; 18	GER; 30	CHN; C	FRA; 13	ESP	GBR	AUS			NC	0
2017	CHL Sport Auto	Citroën DS3 R5	MON; Ret	SWE	MEX	FRA; Ret	ARG	POR; 37	ITA	POL; 18	FIN	GER; 27	ESP; 26	GBR; 26	AUS				NC	0
2018	Yoann Bonato	Peugeot 208 R2	MON; 15	SWE	MEX														28th	1
2018	CHL Sport Auto	Citroën C3 R5				FRA; 10	ARG	POR	ITA	FIN	GER; 26	TUR	GBR	ESP	AUS				28th	1
2019	CHL Sport Auto	Citroën C3 R5	MON; 8	SWE	MEX	FRA; 49	ARG	CHL	POR	ITA	FIN	GER	TUR	GBR	ESP	AUS; C			20th	4
2020	CHL Sport Auto	Citroën C3 R5	MON; 12	SWE	MEX	EST	TUR	ITA	MNZ										NC	0
2021	CHL Sport Auto	Citroën C3 R5	MON; 13	ARC	CRO	POR	ITA	KEN	EST	BEL	GRE	FIN	ESP	MNZ					NC	0

* Season still in progress.

=== WRC-2 Results ===
Year	Entrant	Car	1	2	3	4	5	6	7	8	9	10	11	12	13	14	WDC	Points
2016	CHL Sport Auto	Citroën DS3 R5	MON; 5	SWE	MEX	ARG	POR; 7	ITA	POL; Ret	FIN; 9	GER; 12	CHN; C	FRA; 3	ESP	GBR	AUS	12th	33
2017	CHL Sport Auto	Citroën DS3 R5	MON; Ret	SWE	MEX	FRA; Ret	ARG	POR; 15	ITA	POL; 5	FIN	GER; 13	ESP; 10	GBR; 11	AUS		28th	11
2018	CHL Sport Auto	Citroën C3 R5	MON	SWE	MEX	FRA; 2	ARG	POR	ITA	FIN	GER; 11	TUR	GBR	ESP	AUS		21st	18
2019	CHL Sport Auto	Citroën C3 R5	MON; 1	SWE	MEX	FRA; 12	ARG	CHL	POR	ITA	FIN	GER	TUR	GBR	ESP	AUS; C	19th	25

=== WRC-3 results ===
Year	Entrant	Car	1	2	3	4	5	6	7	8	9	10	11	12	Pos.	Points
2020	CHL Sport Auto	Citroën C3 R5	MON; 3	SWE	MEX	EST	TUR	ITA	MNZ						12th	15
2021	CHL Sport Auto	Citroën C3 R5	MON; 2	ARC	CRO	POR	ITA	KEN	EST	BEL	GRE	FIN	ESP	MNZ	16th	22

* Season still in progress.

=== JWRC Results ===
Year	Entrant	Car	1	2	3	4	5	6	7	8	9	WDC	Points
2006	Yoann Bonato	Renault Clio S1600	SWE	ESP	FRA; 8	ARG	ITA	GER	FIN	TUR	GBR	24th	1
2007	PH Sport	Citroën C2 R2	NOR	POR	ITA	FIN; 8	GER; 7	ESP; 8	FRA; 3			9th	10
2009	Yoann Bonato	Suzuki Swift S1600	IRE; 4	CYP	POR; Ret	ARG	ITA; 4	POL; 3	FIN; Ret	ESP		7th	16
