= 2017 Tour de Corse =

Motor rally competition

2017 Tour de Corse: 60. Che Guevara Energy Drink Tour de Corse 2017
Round 4 of the 2017 World Rally Championship
← Previous event	Next event →
- Host country: France
- Rally base: (France) Ajaccio, Corsica
- Dates run: 6 – 9 April 2017
- Stages: 10 (316.80 km; 196.85 miles)
- Stage surface: Tarmac

Statistics
- Crews: 78 at start, 58 at finish

Overall results
- Overall winner: (Belgium) Thierry Neuville (Belgium) Nicolas Gilsoul (South Korea) Hyundai Motorsport

The 2017 Tour de Corse was the 4th round of the 2017 World Rally Championship. Thierry Neuville and Nicolas Gilsoul were the rally winners. Their team, Hyundai Shell Mobis WRT, were the manufacturers' winners.

== Entry list ==
Notable entrants
No.	Entrant	Class	Driver	Co-driver	Car	Tyre
1	(United Kingdom) M-Sport World Rally Team	WRC	(France) Sébastien Ogier	(France) Julien Ingrassia	Ford Fiesta WRC	M
2	(United Kingdom) M-Sport World Rally Team	WRC	(Estonia) Ott Tänak	(Estonia) Martin Järveoja	Ford Fiesta WRC	M
3	(United Kingdom) M-Sport World Rally Team	WRC	(United Kingdom) Elfyn Evans	(United Kingdom) Daniel Barritt	Ford Fiesta WRC	D
4	(South Korea) Hyundai Motorsport	WRC	(New Zealand) Hayden Paddon	(New Zealand) John Kennard	Hyundai i20 Coupe WRC	M
5	(South Korea) Hyundai Motorsport	WRC	(Belgium) Thierry Neuville	(Belgium) Nicolas Gilsoul	Hyundai i20 Coupe WRC	M
6	(South Korea) Hyundai Motorsport	WRC	(Spain) Dani Sordo	(Spain) Marc Martí	Hyundai i20 Coupe WRC	M
7	(France) Citroën Total Abu Dhabi WRT	WRC	(United Kingdom) Kris Meeke	(Republic of Ireland) Paul Nagle	Citroën C3 WRC	M
8	(France) Citroën Total Abu Dhabi WRT	WRC	(Republic of Ireland) Craig Breen	(United Kingdom) Scott Martin	Citroën C3 WRC	M
9	(France) Citroën Total Abu Dhabi WRT	WRC	(France) Stéphane Lefebvre	(France) Gabin Moreau	Citroën C3 WRC	M
10	(Japan) Toyota Gazoo Racing WRT	WRC	(Finland) Jari-Matti Latvala	(Finland) Miikka Anttila	Toyota Yaris WRC	M
11	(Japan) Toyota Gazoo Racing WRT	WRC	(Finland) Juho Hänninen	(Finland) Kaj Lindström	Toyota Yaris WRC	M
31	(United Kingdom) M-Sport World Rally Team	WRC-2	(France) Eric Camilli	(France) Benjamin Veillas	Ford Fiesta R5	M
32	(Czech Republic) Škoda Motorsport	WRC-2	(Norway) Andreas Mikkelsen	(Norway) Anders Jæger	Škoda Fabia R5	M
33	(Czech Republic) Škoda Motorsport	WRC-2	(Czech Republic) Jan Kopecký	(Czech Republic) Pavel Dresler	Škoda Fabia R5	M
34	(United Kingdom) M-Sport World Rally Team	WRC-2	(Finland) Teemu Suninen	(Finland) Mikko Markkula	Ford Fiesta R5	M
35	(Sweden) Emil Bergkvist	WRC-2	(Sweden) Emil Bergkvist	(Sweden) Joakim Sjöberg	Citroën DS3 R5	M
36	(Czech Republic) Gemini Clinic Rally Team	WRC-2	(France) Bryan Bouffier	(France) Denis Giraudet	Ford Fiesta R5	M
38	(Finland) Printsport Oy	WRC-2	(Norway) Ole Christian Veiby	(Norway) Stig Rune Skjærmoen	Škoda Fabia R5	M
39	(France) Yoann Bonato	WRC-2	(France) Yoann Bonato	(France) Benjamin Boulloud	Citroën DS3 R5	M
40	(France) Pierre-Louis Loubet	WRC-2	(France) Pierre-Louis Loubet	(France) Vincent Landais	Ford Fiesta R5	M
41	(Czech Republic) Gekon racing	WRC-2	(Italy) Simone Tempestini	(Italy) Giovanni Bernacchini	Citroën DS3 R5	M
43	(Slovakia) Styllex - Lracing	WRC-2	(Slovakia) Martin Koči	(Czech Republic) Lukáš Kostka	Škoda Fabia R5	M
44	(France) Yohan Rossel	WRC-2	(France) Yohan Rossel	(France) Benoît Fulcrand	Citroën DS3 R5	M
45	(France) Laurent Pellier	WRC-2	(France) Laurent Pellier	(France) Benoît Neyret-Gigot	Citroën DS3 R5	M
42	(Hungary) TRT Peugeot WRT	WRC-2	(Poland) Łukasz Pieniążek	(Poland) Przemysław Mazur	Peugeot 208 T16	M

Key
Icon	Class
WRC	WRC entries eligible to score manufacturer points
WRC-2	Registered to take part in WRC-2 championship

== Classification ==
=== Event standings ===
Pos.	No.	Driver	Co-driver	Team	Car	Class	Time	Difference	Points
1	5	(Belgium) Thierry Neuville	(Belgium) Nicolas Gilsoul	(South Korea) Hyundai Motorsport	Hyundai i20 Coupe WRC	WRC	3:22:53.4	0.0	26
2	1	(France) Sébastien Ogier	(France) Julien Ingrassia	(United Kingdom) M-Sport World Rally Team	Ford Fiesta WRC	WRC	3:23:48.1	+54.7	22
3	6	(Spain) Dani Sordo	(Spain) Marc Martí	(South Korea) Hyundai Motorsport	Hyundai i20 Coupe WRC	WRC	3:23:49.4	+56.0	17
4	10	(Finland) Jari-Matti Latvala	(Finland) Miikka Anttila	(Japan) Toyota Gazoo Racing WRT	Toyota Yaris WRC	WRC	3:24:03.0	+1:09.6	17
5	8	(Republic of Ireland) Craig Breen	(United Kingdom) Scott Martin	(France) Citroën Total Abu Dhabi WRT	Citroën C3 WRC	WRC	3:24:03.1	+1:09.7	13
6	4	(New Zealand) Hayden Paddon	(New Zealand) John Kennard	(South Korea) Hyundai Motorsport	Hyundai i20 Coupe WRC	WRC	3:25:09.7	+2:16.3	8
7	32	(Norway) Andreas Mikkelsen	(Norway) Anders Jæger	(Czech Republic) Škoda Motorsport	Škoda Fabia R5	WRC-2	3:31:04.1	+8:10.7	6
8	34	(Finland) Teemu Suninen	(Finland) Mikko Markkula	(United Kingdom) M-Sport World Rally Team	Ford Fiesta R5	WRC-2	3:32:10.4	+9:17.0	4
9	84	(France) Stéphane Sarrazin	(France) Jacques-Julien Renucci	(France) Stéphane Sarrazin	Škoda Fabia R5		3:32:17.0	+9:23.6	2
10	44	(France) Yohan Rossel	(France) Benoît Fulcrand	(France) Yohan Rossel	Citroën DS3 R5	WRC-2	3:35:50.5	+12:57.1	1

=== Special stages ===
Day	Stage	Name	Length	Winner	Car	Time	Rally Leader
Leg 1 (7 Apr)	SS1	Pietrosella – Albitreccia 1	31.20 km	(United Kingdom) Kris Meeke	Citroën C3 WRC	19:56.5	(United Kingdom) Kris Meeke
Leg 1 (7 Apr)	SS2	Plage du Liamone – Sarrola Carcopino 1	29.12 km	(United Kingdom) Kris Meeke	Citroën C3 WRC	18:22.3	(United Kingdom) Kris Meeke
Leg 1 (7 Apr)	SS3	Pietrosella – Albitreccia 2	31.20 km	(France) Sébastien Ogier	Ford Fiesta WRC	19:52.1	(United Kingdom) Kris Meeke
Leg 1 (7 Apr)	SS4	Plage du Liamone – Sarrola Carcopino 2	29.12 km	(United Kingdom) Kris Meeke	Citroën C3 WRC	18:20.4	(United Kingdom) Kris Meeke
Leg 2 (8 Apr)	SS5	La Porta – Valle di Rostino 1	48.71 km	(Belgium) Thierry Neuville	Hyundai i20 Coupe WRC	32:19.6	(United Kingdom) Kris Meeke
Leg 2 (8 Apr)	SS6	Novella 1	17.27 km	(Belgium) Thierry Neuville	Hyundai i20 Coupe WRC	11:13.1	(United Kingdom) Kris Meeke
Leg 2 (8 Apr)	SS7	La Porta – Valle di Rostino 2	48.71 km	(France) Sébastien Ogier	Ford Fiesta WRC	32:15.9	(Belgium) Thierry Neuville
Leg 2 (8 Apr)	SS8	Novella 2	17.27 km	(Belgium) Thierry Neuville	Hyundai i20 Coupe WRC	11:17.7	(Belgium) Thierry Neuville
Leg 3 (9 Apr)	SS9	Antisanti – Poggio di Nazza	53.78 km	(Belgium) Thierry Neuville	Hyundai i20 Coupe WRC	32:34.6	(Belgium) Thierry Neuville
Leg 3 (9 Apr)	SS10	Porto Vecchio – Palombaggia [Power Stage]	10.42 km	(Finland) Jari-Matti Latvala	Toyota Yaris WRC	6:02.2	(Belgium) Thierry Neuville

=== Power Stage ===
The Power Stage was a 10.42 km (6.5 mi) stage at the end of the rally.

Pos.	Driver	Co-driver	Car	Time	Diff.	Pts.
1	(Finland) Jari-Matti Latvala	(Finland) Miikka Anttila	Toyota Yaris WRC	6:02.2		5
2	(France) Sébastien Ogier	(France) Julien Ingrassia	Ford Fiesta WRC	6:03.0	+0.8	4
3	(Republic of Ireland) Craig Breen	(United Kingdom) Scott Martin	Citroën C3 WRC	6:04.3	+2.1	3
4	(Spain) Dani Sordo	(Spain) Marc Martí	Hyundai i20 Coupe WRC	6:06.8	+4.6	2
5	(Belgium) Thierry Neuville	(Belgium) Nicolas Gilsoul	Hyundai i20 Coupe WRC	6:08.6	+6.4	1

=== Championship standings after the rally ===
Drivers' Championship standings

	Pos.	Driver	Points
	1	(France) Sébastien Ogier	88
	2	(Finland) Jari-Matti Latvala	75
2	3	(Belgium) Thierry Neuville	54
1	4	(Estonia) Ott Tänak	48
1	5	(Spain) Dani Sordo	47

Manufacturers' Championship standings

	Pos.	Manufacturer	Points
	1	(United Kingdom) M-Sport World Rally Team	129
1	2	(South Korea) Hyundai Motorsport	105
1	3	(Japan) Toyota Gazoo Racing WRT	79
	4	(France) Citroën Total Abu Dhabi WRT	71
