= Citroën C3 WRC =

Citroën World Rally Car

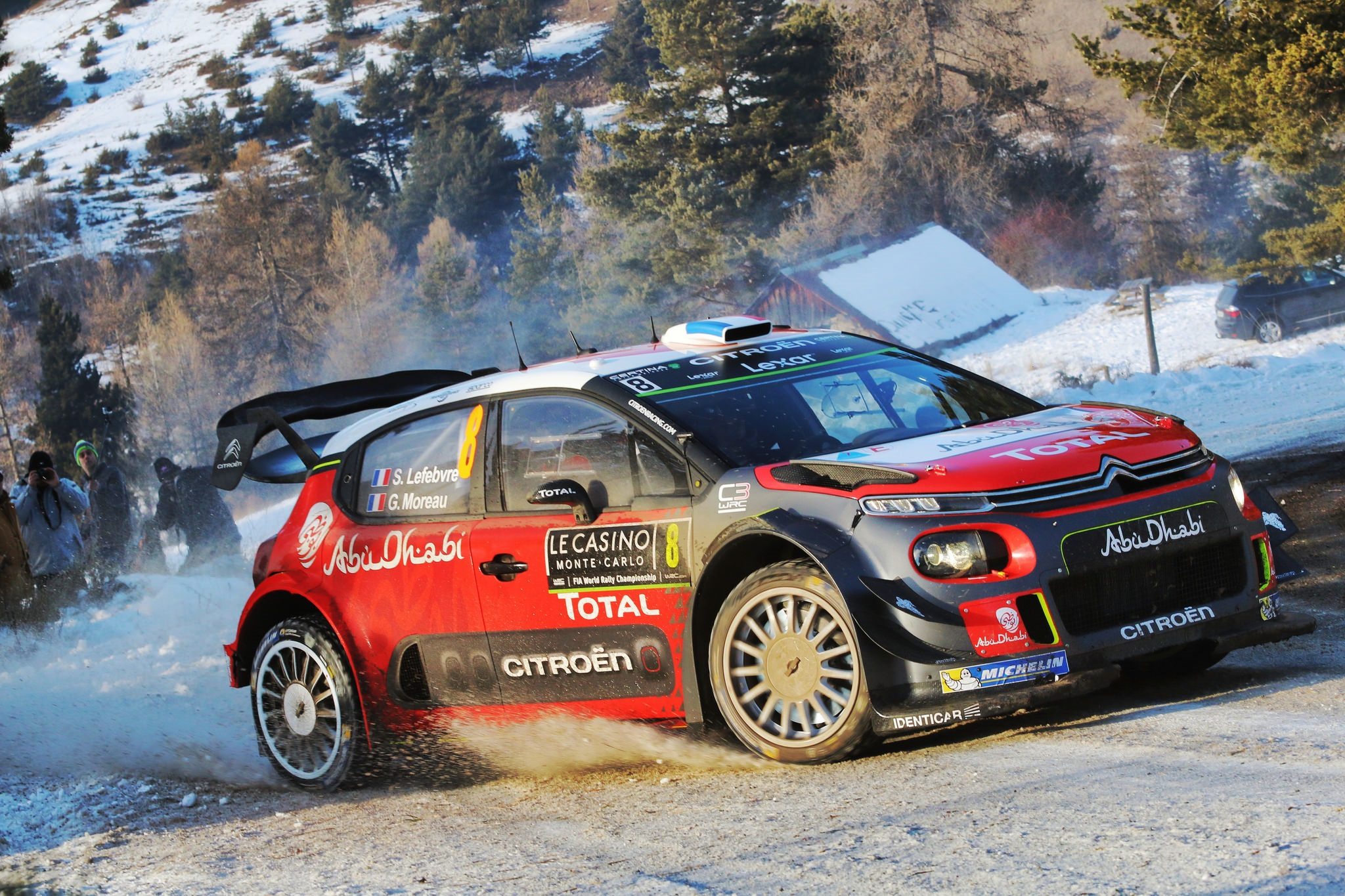
- C3 WRC of Stéphane Lefebvre in Monte Carlo
- Category: World Rally Championship
- Designer: Laurent Fregosi
- Predecessor: Citroën DS3 WRC

Technical specifications
- Suspension: MacPherson
- Length: 4,128 mm
- Width: 1,875 mm
- Axle track: 1,670 mm
- Wheelbase: 2,540 mm
- Engine: PSA 1.6 L (98 cu in) I4 Turbocharger
- Transmission: Six-speed sequential 4-wheel drive, mechanical front and rear self-locking hydraulically-controlled central differential
- Power: 380 brake horsepower (280 kW) @ 6,500 rpm 400 newton-metres (300 lbf⋅ft) @ 4,500 rpm
- Weight: 1,190 kg
- Brakes: Front: Ventilated disks, 370 mm (tarmac) and 300 mm (gravel) Water-cooled four-piston callipers (tarmac); Rear: Ventilated disks, 330 mm (tarmac) and 300 mm (gravel) Four-piston callipers
- Tyres: Michelin
- Clutch: Cerametallic twin-disk

Competition history (WRC)
- Notable entrants: (France) Citroën World Rally Team
- Notable drivers: (United Arab Emirates) Khalid Al Qassimi (Republic of Ireland) Craig Breen (Finland) Esapekka Lappi (France) Stéphane Lefebvre (France) Sébastien Loeb (United Kingdom) Kris Meeke (France) Sébastien Ogier (Norway) Mads Østberg
- Debut: (Monaco) 2017 Monte Carlo Rally
- First win: 2017 Rally Mexico
- Last win: 2019 Rally Turkey
- Last event: (Spain) 2019 Rally Catalunya
Races	Wins	Podiums	Titles
39	6	19	0

The Citroën C3 WRC is a rally car designed and developed by the Citroën World Rally Team to compete in the World Rally Championship. The car, which is a replacement for the successful Citroën DS3 WRC, is based on the Citroën C3. The C3 WRC made its début at the start of the 2017 season, where it was driven by Craig Breen, Stéphane Lefebvre and Kris Meeke, with Khalid Al Qassimi entering a fourth car at selected events.

== Development history ==
Citroën formally announced its intentions to withdraw from full-time competition at the end of the 2015 season in order to focus on the development of the C3 WRC. The team contested selected events during the 2016 season, using the DS3 WRC as a testing platform for selected parts. Further testing and development was carried out using the Citroën C-Elysée WTCC, the car used by Citroën in the World Touring Car Championship. The C3 WRC's début in 2017 coincided with the widespread revisions to the sport's technical regulations.

== WRC victories ==
Year	No.	Event	Surface	Driver	Co-driver	Entrant
2017	1	2017 Rally Mexico	Gravel	(United Kingdom) Kris Meeke	(Republic of Ireland) Paul Nagle	(France) Citroën World Rally Team
2017	2	(Spain) 2017 Rally Catalunya	Mixed	(United Kingdom) Kris Meeke	(Republic of Ireland) Paul Nagle	(France) Citroën World Rally Team
2018	3	(Spain) 2018 Rally Catalunya	Mixed	(France) Sébastien Loeb	(Monaco) Daniel Elena	(France) Citroën World Rally Team
2019	4	(Monaco) 2019 Monte Carlo Rally	Mixed	(France) Sébastien Ogier	(France) Julien Ingrassia	(France) Citroën World Rally Team
2019	5	2019 Rally Mexico	Gravel	(France) Sébastien Ogier	(France) Julien Ingrassia	(France) Citroën World Rally Team
2019	6	2019 Rally Turkey	Gravel	(France) Sébastien Ogier	(France) Julien Ingrassia	(France) Citroën World Rally Team

== WRC results ==
Year	Entrant	Driver	Rounds														Points	WCM pos.
Year	Entrant	Driver	1	2	3	4	5	6	7	8	9	10	11	12	13	14	Points	WCM pos.
2017	(France) Citroën Total Abu Dhabi WRT	(United Kingdom) Kris Meeke	MON; Ret	SWE; 12	MEX; 1	FRA; Ret	ARG; Ret	POR; 18	ITA; Ret	POL	FIN; 8	GER; Ret	ESP; 1	GBR; 7	AUS; 7		218	4th
2017	(France) Citroën Total Abu Dhabi WRT	(Republic of Ireland) Craig Breen	MON	SWE; 5	MEX	FRA; 5	ARG; Ret	POR; 5	ITA; 25	POL; 11	FIN; 5	GER; 5	ESP	GBR; 15	AUS; Ret		218	4th
2017	(France) Citroën Total Abu Dhabi WRT	(France) Stéphane Lefebvre	MON; 9	SWE	MEX; 15	FRA; 50	ARG	POR; 13	ITA	POL; 5	FIN	GER	ESP; 6	GBR	AUS; Ret		218	4th
2017	(France) Citroën Total Abu Dhabi WRT	(Norway) Andreas Mikkelsen	MON	SWE	MEX	FRA	ARG	POR	ITA; 8	POL; 9	FIN	GER; 2	ESP	GBR	AUS		218	4th
2017	(France) Citroën Total Abu Dhabi WRT	(United Arab Emirates) Khalid Al Qassimi	MON	SWE	MEX	FRA	ARG	POR; 17	ITA	POL	FIN; 16	GER	ESP; 17	GBR; 22	AUS		218	4th
2018	(France) Citroën Total Abu Dhabi WRT	(United Kingdom) Kris Meeke	MON; 4	SWE; Ret	MEX; 3	FRA; 9	ARG; 7	POR; Ret	ITA; WD	FIN	GER	TUR	GBR	ESP	AUS		237	4th
2018	(France) Citroën Total Abu Dhabi WRT	(Republic of Ireland) Craig Breen	MON; 9	SWE; 2	MEX	FRA	ARG; Ret	POR; 7	ITA; 6	FIN; 8	GER; 7	TUR; Ret	GBR; 4	ESP; 9	AUS; 7		237	4th
2018	(France) Citroën Total Abu Dhabi WRT	(France) Sébastien Loeb	MON	SWE	MEX; 5	FRA; 14	ARG	POR	ITA	FIN	GER	TUR	GBR	ESP; 1	AUS		237	4th
2018	(France) Citroën Total Abu Dhabi WRT	(Norway) Mads Østberg	MON	SWE; 6	MEX	FRA	ARG	POR; 6	ITA; 5	FIN; 2	GER; Ret	TUR; 23	GBR; 8	ESP	AUS; 3		237	4th
2018	(France) Citroën Total Abu Dhabi WRT	(United Arab Emirates) Khalid Al Qassimi	MON	SWE	MEX	FRA	ARG; 14	POR	ITA	FIN; 37	GER	TUR; 15	GBR	ESP; 21	AUS		237	4th
2019	(France) Citroën Total WRT	(France) Sébastien Ogier	MON; 1	SWE; 29	MEX; 1	FRA; 2	ARG; 3	CHL; 2	POR; 3	ITA; 41	FIN; 5	GER; 7	TUR; 1	GBR; 3	ESP; 8	AUS; C	284	3rd
2019	(France) Citroën Total WRT	(Finland) Esapekka Lappi	MON; Ret	SWE; 2	MEX; 13	FRA; 7	ARG; Ret	CHL; 6	POR; Ret	ITA; 7	FIN; 2	GER; 8	TUR; 2	GBR; 27	ESP; Ret	AUS; C	284	3rd

* Season still in progress.

== See also ==
- World Rally Car
  - Ford Fiesta RS WRC
  - Ford Fiesta WRC
  - Hyundai i20 WRC
  - Hyundai i20 Coupe WRC
  - Mini John Cooper Works WRC
  - Toyota Yaris WRC
  - Volkswagen Polo R WRC
