= Hiroki Arai =

Japanese rally driver

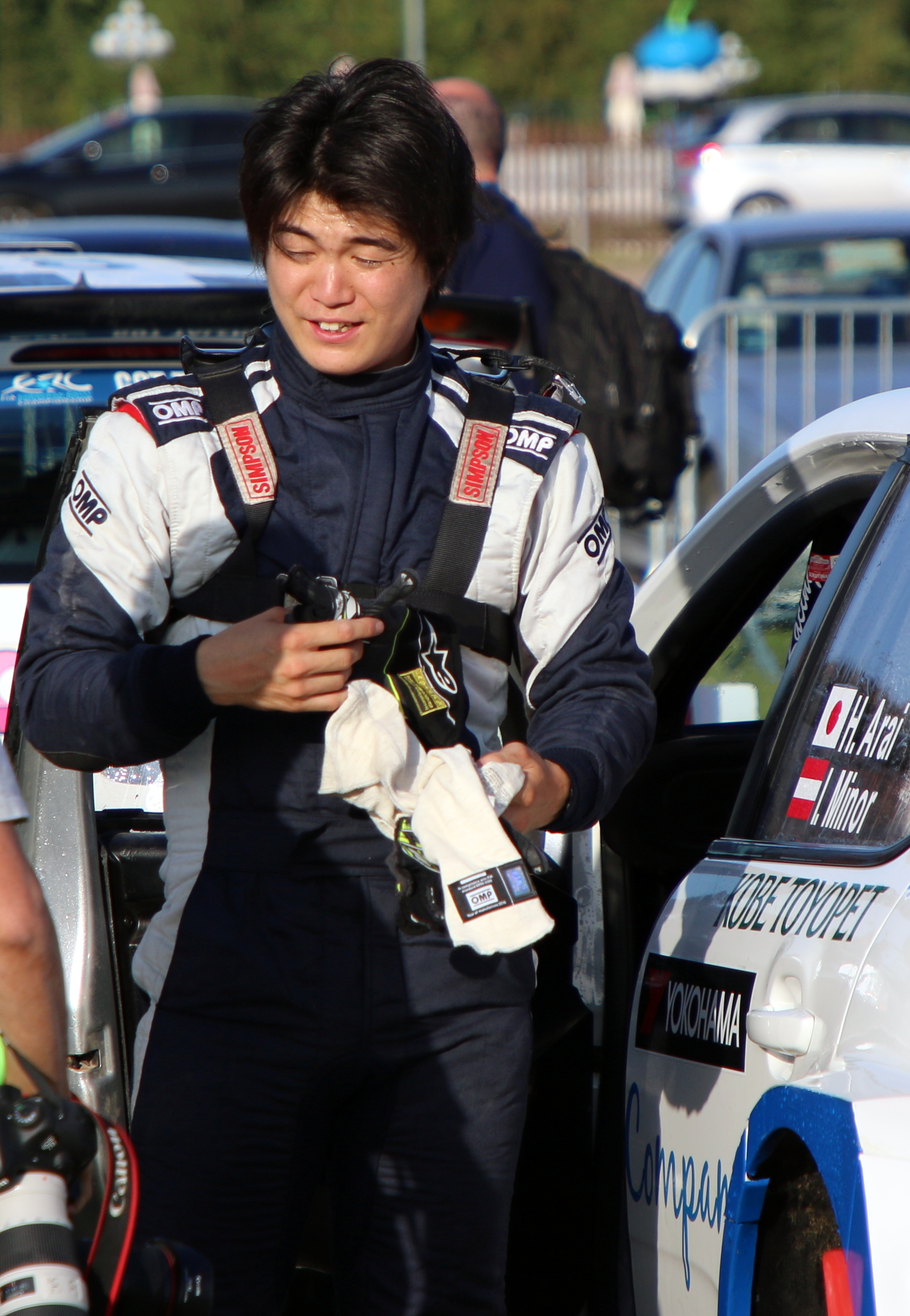
- Hiroki Arai at the 2019 Rally Poland
- Born: 2 August 1993 (age 33) Gunma, Japan
- Relatives: Toshi Arai (father)
World Rally Championship record
- Years active: 2016–2018, 2021–present
- Rallies: 15
- Championships: 0
- Rally wins: 0
- Podiums: 0
- Stage wins: 0
- First rally: 2016 Rally Finland

Hiroki Arai (新井大輝, Arai Hiroki; born 2 August 1993) is a Japanese rally driver.

== Biography ==
Arai is the son of former Japanese rally driver Toshi Arai. In 2015, he was selected by Toyota Gazoo Racing to join their Rally Challenge Program, alongside Takamoto Katsuta, and made his WRC debut in 2016. After over two years of absence in WRC, he returned at the 2021 Croatia Rally. In November 2023, Arai scored his first point in the WRC, after finishing tenth at the 2023 Rally Japan in a Peugeot 208 Rally4.

== Rally results ==
=== WRC results ===
Year	Entrant	Car	1	2	3	4	5	6	7	8	9	10	11	12	13	14	WDC	Points
2016	Tommi Mäkinen Racing	Ford Fiesta R5	MON	SWE	MEX	ARG	POR	ITA	POL; 42	FIN; Ret	GER	CHN; C	FRA	ESP	GBR	AUS	NC	0
2017	Tommi Mäkinen Racing	Ford Fiesta R5	MON	SWE; 19	MEX	FRA	ARG	POR; Ret	ITA; Ret	POL	FIN; Ret	GER	ESP	GBR	AUS		NC	0
2018	Tommi Mäkinen Racing	Ford Fiesta R5	MON	SWE; 20	MEX	FRA; 55	ARG	POR; 12	ITA; Ret	FIN; 23	GER	TUR	GBR	ESP	AUS		NC	0
2021	Hiroki Arai	Ford Fiesta Rally2	MON	ARC	CRO; Ret	POR	ITA	KEN	EST	BEL	GRE	FIN	ESP	MNZ			NC	0
2022	Ahead Japan Racing Team	Peugeot 208 Rally4	MON	SWE	CRO	POR	ITA	KEN	EST	FIN	BEL	GRE	NZL	ESP	JPN; 15		NC	0
2023	Ahead Japan Racing Team	Peugeot 208 Rally4	MON	SWE	MEX	CRO	POR	ITA	KEN	EST	FIN	GRE	CHL	EUR	JPN; 10		28th	1

* Season still in progress.
