= Miikka Anttila =

Finnish rally co-driver (born 1972)

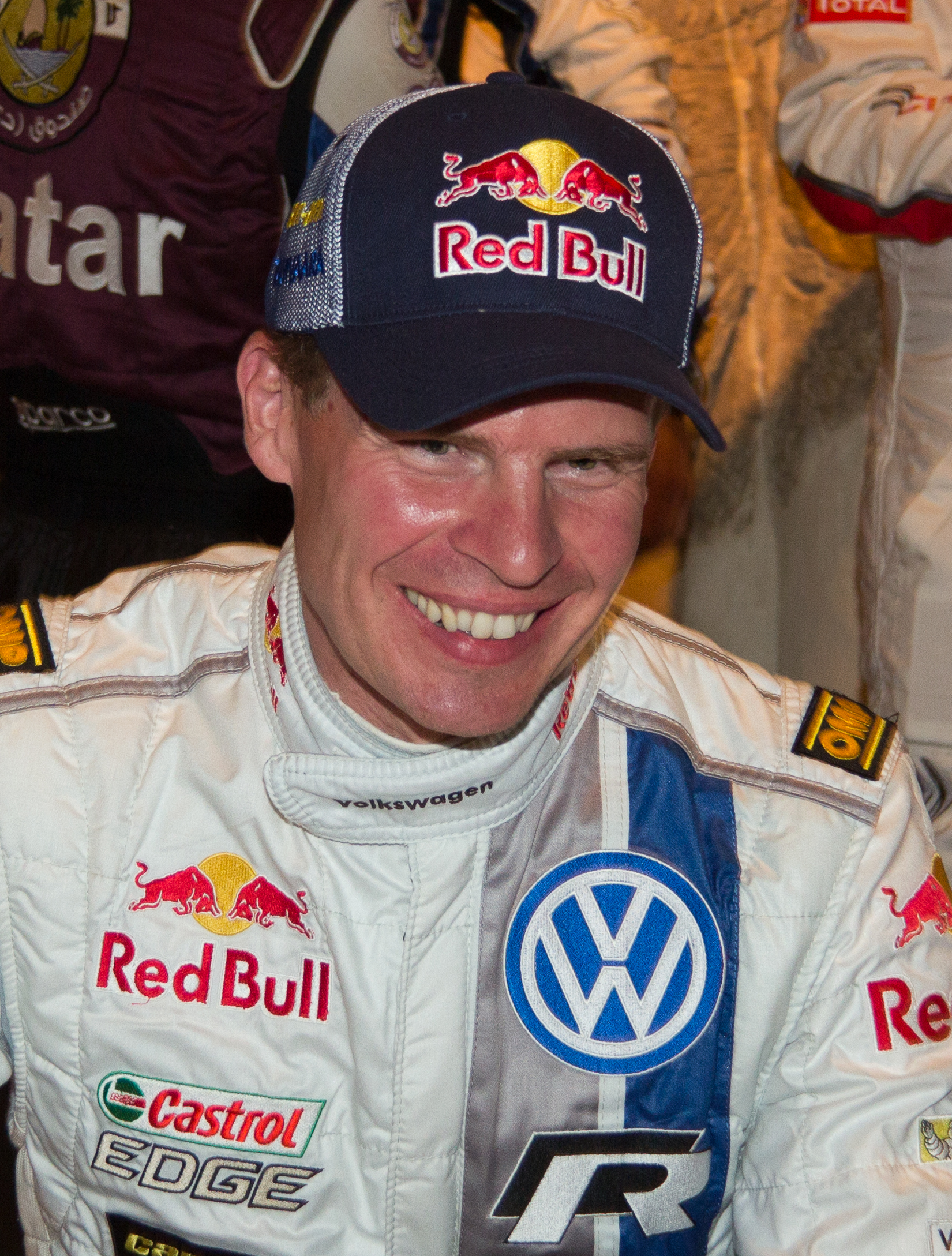
- Miikka Anttila at the 2013 Rallye Deutschland

Personal information
- Nationality: (Finland) Finnish
- Full name: Miikka Paavali Anttila
- Born: 10 September 1972 (age 54); Janakkala, Finland

World Rally Championship record
- Years active: 1999–2020
- Driver: (Finland) Janne Tuohino (Finland) Jani Pirttinen (Finland) Mikko Hirvonen (Finland) Kosti Katajamäki (Finland) Jari-Matti Latvala (Finland) Aki Teiskonen (Finland) Eerik Pietarinen
- Teams: Toyota Gazoo Racing WRT; Volkswagen Motorsport; Ford World Rally Team
- Rallies: 220
- Championships: 0
- Rally wins: 18
- Podiums: 67
- Stage wins: 539
- First rally: 1999 Rally Finland
- First win: 2008 Rally Sweden
- Last win: 2018 Rally Australia
- Last rally: 2020 Rally Sweden

Miikka Paavali Anttila (born 10 September 1972) is a Finnish rally co-driver, mostly known teaming with Jari-Matti Latvala. Anttila has previously served alongside such drivers as Mikko Hirvonen, Janne Tuohino and Kosti Katajamäki.

== Career ==
Debuting in the World Rally Championship in 1999, Anttila began co-driving Latvala at the 2003 Rallye Deutschland and got his first win at the 2008 Swedish Rally. He missed the birth of his second child to participate in the Rally de Espana in 2011.

Anttila joined Volkswagen Motorsport after its formation as a manufacturer team in 2013.

For 2017, Anttila is racing for the works Toyota team.

At the 2018 Tour de Corse, Anttila made his 197th WRC start which made him the most experienced competitor in the history of the sport. The record was previously held by Spanish driver and two times world-champion Carlos Sainz who started 196 events. He became the first-ever competitor to start 200 rallies in the WRC at the 2018 Rally d'Italia.

Until 2019, Anttila was paired up with Jari-Matti Latvala racing for Toyota.

In 2020, Anttila started co-driving Eerik Pietarinen.

== Rally victories ==
=== WRC victories ===
#	Event	Season	Driver	Car
1	(Sweden) Swedish Rally	2008	(Finland) Jari-Matti Latvala	Ford Focus RS WRC 07
2	(Italy) Rally d'Italia Sardegna	2009	(Finland) Jari-Matti Latvala	Ford Focus RS WRC 09
3	Rally New Zealand	2010	(Finland) Jari-Matti Latvala	Ford Focus RS WRC 09
4	Rally Finland	2010	(Finland) Jari-Matti Latvala	Ford Focus RS WRC 09
5	(United Kingdom) Wales Rally GB	2011	(Finland) Jari-Matti Latvala	Ford Fiesta RS WRC
6	Rally Sweden	2012	(Finland) Jari-Matti Latvala	Ford Fiesta RS WRC
7	(United Kingdom) Wales Rally GB	2012	(Finland) Jari-Matti Latvala	Ford Fiesta RS WRC
8	(Greece) Acropolis Rally	2013	(Finland) Jari-Matti Latvala	Volkswagen Polo R WRC
9	Rally Sweden	2014	(Finland) Jari-Matti Latvala	Volkswagen Polo R WRC
10	Rally Argentina	2014	(Finland) Jari-Matti Latvala	Volkswagen Polo R WRC
11	Rally Finland	2014	(Finland) Jari-Matti Latvala	Volkswagen Polo R WRC
12	Rallye de France Alsace	2014	(Finland) Jari-Matti Latvala	Volkswagen Polo R WRC
13	Rally de Portugal	2015	(Finland) Jari-Matti Latvala	Volkswagen Polo R WRC
14	Rally Finland	2015	(Finland) Jari-Matti Latvala	Volkswagen Polo R WRC
15	(France) Tour de Corse	2015	(Finland) Jari-Matti Latvala	Volkswagen Polo R WRC
16	Rally Mexico	2016	(Finland) Jari-Matti Latvala	Volkswagen Polo R WRC
17	Rally Sweden	2017	(Finland) Jari-Matti Latvala	Toyota Yaris WRC
18	Rally Australia	2018	(Finland) Jari-Matti Latvala	Toyota Yaris WRC

== Rally results ==
=== WRC results ===
Year	Entrant	Car	1	2	3	4	5	6	7	8	9	10	11	12	13	14	15	16	WDC	Points
1999	LPM Human Heat	Ford Escort WRC	MON	SWE	KEN	POR	ESP	FRA	ARG	GRC	NZL	FIN; 8	CHN	ITA		GBR; Ret			NC	0
1999	Janne Tuohino	Volkswagen Polo 16v													AUS; Ret				NC	0
2000	Janne Tuohino	Toyota Corolla WRC	MON	SWE; 15	KEN	POR; Ret	ESP	ARG	GRC	NZL	FIN; Ret	CYP	FRA	ITA	AUS	GBR			NC	0
2001	Jani Pirttinen	Volkswagen Polo IV Kit Car	MON	SWE	POR	ESP	ARG	CYP	GRE	KEN	FIN; 24	NZL	ITA	FRA	AUS	GBR			NC	0
2002	Mikko Hirvonen	Renault Clio S1600	MON	SWE	FRA	ESP	CYP	ARG	GRC	KEN	FIN; 21	GER	ITA; Ret	NZL	AUS	GBR			NC	0
2003	Kosti Katajamäki	Volkswagen Polo S1600	MON; EX	SWE	TUR; 15	NZL	ARG	GRE; Ret	CYP										NC	0
2003	Ford Motor Company	Ford Focus RS WRC 02								GER; 17	FIN; 14	AUS	ITA	FRA	ESP	GBR; 10			NC	0
2004	Jari-Matti Latvala	Ford Puma S1600	MON; Ret																NC	0
2004	Jari-Matti Latvala	Subaru Impreza WRX STI		SWE; Ret	MEX	NZL	CYP					GER; 27	JPN			FRA; 21			NC	0
2004	Jari-Matti Latvala	Ford Fiesta S1600						GRE; Ret	TUR; Ret	ARG									NC	0
2004	Jari-Matti Latvala	Suzuki Ignis S1600									FIN; Ret			GBR; 23	ITA; Ret		ESP; 29		NC	0
2004	Jari-Matti Latvala	Mitsubishi Lancer Evo VIII																AUS; Ret	NC	0
2005	Jari-Matti Latvala	Toyota Corolla WRC	MON	SWE; 16	MEX							FIN; Ret							NC	0
2005	Jari-Matti Latvala	Subaru Impreza WRX STI				NZL; Ret	ITA; 16		TUR	GRE	ARG; Ret		GER; 21			FRA; 16	ESP; 19	AUS	NC	0
2005	Jari-Matti Latvala	Ford Focus RS WRC												GBR; Ret	JPN				NC	0
2005	Syms Rally Team	Subaru Impreza WRX STI						CYP; 15											NC	0
2006	Jari-Matti Latvala	Subaru Impreza WRX STI	MON; 41	SWE	MEX; 25					GRE; 22			JPN; 69		TUR	AUS; 6	NZL; 8		13th	9
2006	Jari-Matti Latvala	Toyota Corolla WRC										FIN; 17							13th	9
2006	Stobart VK Ford Rally Team	Ford Focus RS WRC 04				ESP; 16	FRA; Ret	ARG	ITA		GER; 34								13th	9
2006	Stobart VK Ford Rally Team	Ford Focus RS WRC 06																GBR; 4	13th	9
2006	Syms Rally Team	Subaru Impreza WRX STI												CYP; 12					13th	9
2007	Stobart VK M-Sport Ford Rally Team	Ford Focus RS WRC 06	MON; Ret	SWE; Ret	NOR; 5	MEX; 7	POR; 8	ARG; 4	ITA; 9	GRE; 12	FIN; Ret	GER; 8	NZL; 5	ESP; 7	FRA; 4	JPN; 25	IRE; 3	GBR; 10	8th	30
2008	BP Ford Abu Dhabi World Rally Team	Ford Focus RS WRC 07	MON; 12	SWE; 1	MEX; 3	ARG; 15	JOR; 7	ITA; 3	GRE; 7	TUR; 2	FIN; 38								4th	58
2008	BP Ford Abu Dhabi World Rally Team	Ford Focus RS WRC 08										GER; 9	NZL; Ret			JPN; 2	GBR; 2		4th	58
2008	Stobart VK M-Sport Ford Rally Team	Ford Focus RS WRC 07												ESP; 6	FRA; 4				4th	58
2009	BP Ford Abu Dhabi World Rally Team	Ford Focus RS WRC 08	IRE; 14	NOR; 3	CYP; 12	POR; Ret	ARG; 6												4th	41
2009	BP Ford Abu Dhabi World Rally Team	Ford Focus RS WRC 09						ITA; 1	GRE; 3	POL; Ret	FIN; 3	AUS; 4	ESP; 6	GBR; 7					4th	41
2010	BP Ford Abu Dhabi World Rally Team	Ford Focus RS WRC 09	SWE; 3	MEX; 5	JOR; 2	TUR; 8	NZL; 1	POR; Ret	BUL; 6	FIN; 1	GER; 4	JPN; 3	FRA; 4	ESP; 4	GBR; 3				2nd	171
2011	Ford Abu Dhabi World Rally Team	Ford Fiesta RS WRC	SWE; 3	MEX; 3	POR; 3	JOR; 2	ITA; 18	ARG; 7	GRE; 9	FIN; 2	GER; 14	AUS; 2	FRA; 4	ESP; 3	GBR; 1				4th	172
2012	Ford World Rally Team	Ford Fiesta RS WRC	MON; Ret	SWE; 1	MEX; Ret	POR; 13	ARG	GRE; 3	NZL; 7	FIN; 3	GER; 2	GBR; 1	FRA; 2	ITA; 12	ESP; 2				3rd	154
2013	Volkswagen Motorsport	Volkswagen Polo R WRC	MON; Ret	SWE; 4	MEX; 16	POR; 3	ARG; 3	GRE; 1	ITA; 3	FIN; 17	GER; 7	AUS; 4	FRA; 3	ESP; 2	GBR; 2				3rd	162
2014	Volkswagen Motorsport	Volkswagen Polo R WRC	MON; 5	SWE; 1	MEX; 2	POR; 14	ARG; 1	ITA; 3	POL; 5	FIN; 1	GER; Ret	AUS; 2	FRA; 1	ESP; 2	GBR; 8				2nd	218
2015	Volkswagen Motorsport	Volkswagen Polo R WRC	MON; 2	SWE; Ret	MEX; 15	ARG; Ret	POR; 1	ITA; 6	POL; 5	FIN; 1	GER; 2	AUS; 2	FRA; 1	ESP; 2	GBR; 50				2nd	183
2016	Volkswagen Motorsport	Volkswagen Polo R WRC	MON; Ret	SWE; 26	MEX; 1	ARG; 16	POR; 6	ITA; 2	POL; 5	FIN; 2	GER; 48	CHN; C	FRA; 4	ESP; 14	GBR; 7	AUS; 9			6th	112
2017	Toyota Gazoo Racing WRT	Toyota Yaris WRC	MON; 2	SWE; 1	MEX; 6	FRA; 4	ARG; 5	POR; 9	ITA; 2	POL; 20	FIN; 21	GER; 7	ESP; Ret	GBR; 5	AUS; Ret				4th	136
2018	Toyota Gazoo Racing WRT	Toyota Yaris WRC	MON; 3	SWE; 7	MEX; 8	FRA; Ret	ARG; Ret	POR; 24	ITA; 7	FIN; 3	GER; Ret	TUR; 2	GBR; 2	ESP; 8	AUS; 1				4th	128
2019	Toyota Gazoo Racing WRT	Toyota Yaris WRC	MON; 5	SWE; 21	MEX; 8	FRA; 10	ARG; 5	CHL; 11	POR; 7	ITA; 19	FIN; 3	GER; 3	TUR; 6	GBR; Ret	ESP; 5	AUS; C			7th	94
2020	Eerik Pietarinen	Škoda Fabia R5 Evo	MON	SWE; 16	MEX	EST	TUR	ITA	MNZ										NC	0
