= 2018 Rally Italia Sardegna =

Motor racing event

2018 Rally Italia Sardegna 15°Rally Italia Sardegna
Round 7 of 13 in the 2018 World Rally Championship
← Previous event	Next event →
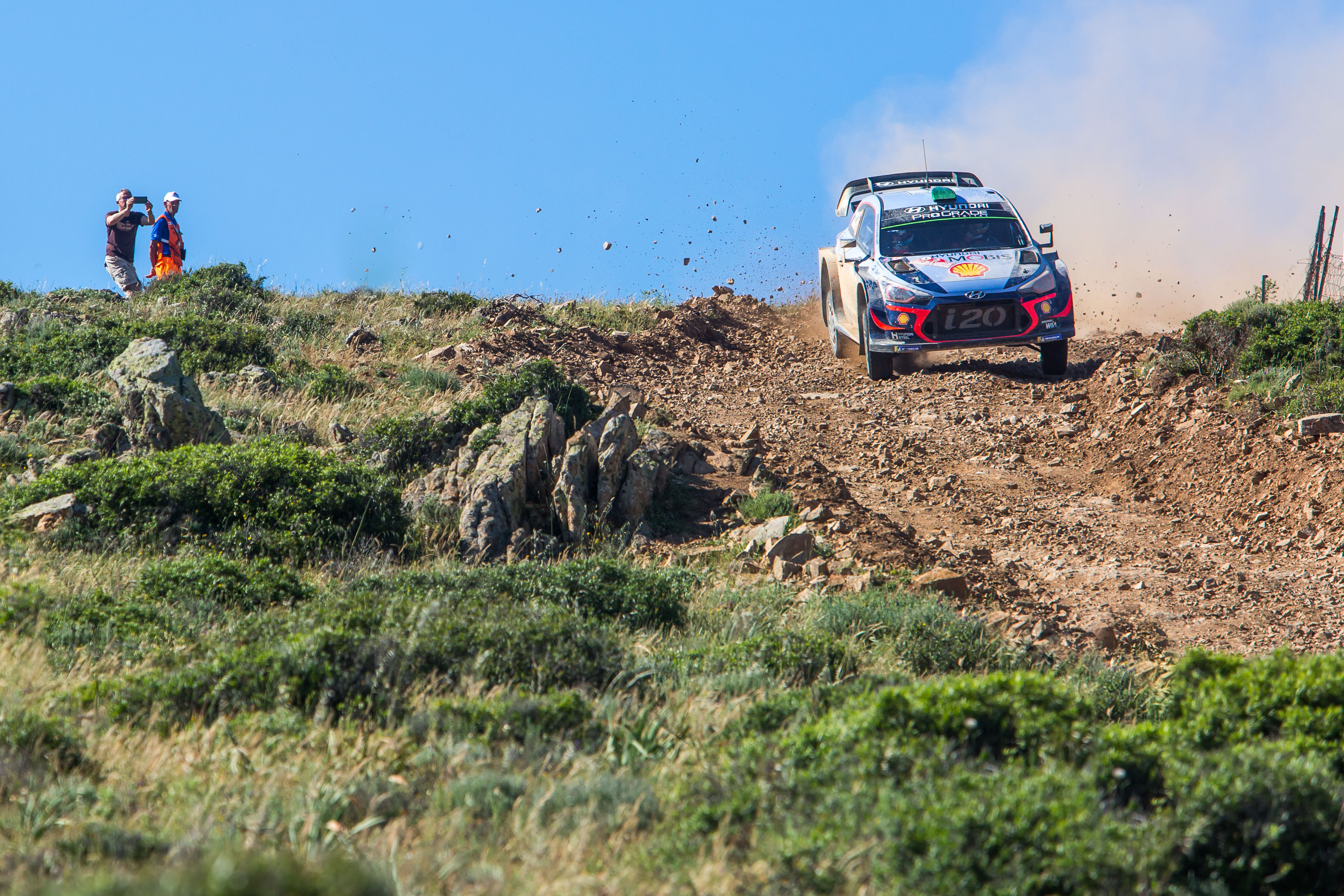
- The Hyundai i20 Coupe WRC of Hayden Paddon and Sebastian Marshall during the Power stage.
- Host country: Italy
- Rally base: Alghero, Sardinia
- Dates run: 7 – 10 June 2018
- Start location: Ittiri motocross track, Alghero
- Finish location: Argentiera, Alghero
- Stages: 20 (313.46 km; 194.78 miles)
- Stage surface: Gravel
- Transport distance: 1,072.92 km (666.68 miles)
- Overall distance: 1,386.38 km (861.46 miles)

Statistics
- Crews registered: 47
- Crews: 45 at start, 34 at finish

Overall results
- Overall winner: (Belgium) Thierry Neuville (Belgium) Nicolas Gilsoul (South Korea) Hyundai Shell Mobis WRT; 3:29:18.7
- Power Stage winner: (Belgium) Thierry Neuville (Belgium) Nicolas Gilsoul (South Korea) Hyundai Shell Mobis WRT

Support category results
- WRC-2 winner: (Czech Republic) Jan Kopecký (Czech Republic) Pavel Dresler (Czech Republic) Škoda Motorsport II; 3:42:33.3
- WRC-3 winner: Jean-Baptiste Franceschi; Romain Courbon; Équipe de France FFSA Rally; 4:07:40.2

The 2018 Rally Italia Sardegna (formally known as the Rally Italia Sardegna 2018) was a motor racing event for rally cars that was held over four days between 7 and 10 June 2018. It marked the fifteenth running of Rally Italia Sardegna, and was the seventh round of the 2018 FIA World Rally Championship and its support categories, the WRC-2 and WRC-3 championships. The event was based in Alghero in Sardinia and consisted of twenty special stages totalling 313.46 km (194.78 mi) in competitive kilometres.

Ott Tänak and Martin Järveoja were the defending rally winners. Thierry Neuville and Nicolas Gilsoul were the rally winners, with their team, Hyundai Shell Mobis WRT as the manufacturers' winners. The Škoda Motorsport II crew of Jan Kopecký and Pavel Dresler won the World Rally Championship-2 category in a Škoda Fabia R5, while the crew of Jean-Baptiste Franceschi and Romain Courbon won the World Rally Championship-3.

== Background ==
=== Championship standings prior to the event ===
Thierry Neuville and Nicolas Gilsoul entered the round with a nineteen-point lead in the World Championship for Drivers and Co-drivers. In the World Championship for Manufacturers, Hyundai Shell Mobis WRT held a thirteen-point lead over M-Sport Ford WRT.

=== Entry list ===
The following crews were entered into the rally. The event was open to crews competing in the World Rally Championship, World Rally Championship-2, and the World Rally Championship-3. The final entry list consisted of fifteen World Rally Cars, twelve World Rally Championship-2 entries, and four World Rally Championship-3 entries.

No.	Entrant	Driver	Co-Driver	Car	Tyre
World Rally Car entries
1	(United Kingdom) M-Sport Ford WRT	(France) Sébastien Ogier	(France) Julien Ingrassia	Ford Fiesta WRC	MI
2	(United Kingdom) M-Sport Ford WRT	(United Kingdom) Elfyn Evans	(United Kingdom) Daniel Barritt	Ford Fiesta WRC	MI
3	(United Kingdom) M-Sport Ford WRT	(Finland) Teemu Suninen	(Finland) Mikko Markkula	Ford Fiesta WRC	MI
4	(South Korea) Hyundai Shell Mobis WRT	(Norway) Andreas Mikkelsen	(Norway) Anders Jæger-Synnevaag	Hyundai i20 Coupe WRC	MI
5	(South Korea) Hyundai Shell Mobis WRT	(Belgium) Thierry Neuville	(Belgium) Nicolas Gilsoul	Hyundai i20 Coupe WRC	MI
6	(South Korea) Hyundai Shell Mobis WRT	(New Zealand) Hayden Paddon	(United Kingdom) Sebastian Marshall	Hyundai i20 Coupe WRC	MI
7	(Japan) Toyota Gazoo Racing WRT	(Finland) Jari-Matti Latvala	(Finland) Miikka Anttila	Toyota Yaris WRC	MI
8	(Japan) Toyota Gazoo Racing WRT	(Estonia) Ott Tänak	(Estonia) Martin Järveoja	Toyota Yaris WRC	MI
9	(Japan) Toyota Gazoo Racing WRT	(Finland) Esapekka Lappi	(Finland) Janne Ferm	Toyota Yaris WRC	MI
11	(France) Citroën Total Abu Dhabi WRT	(Republic of Ireland) Craig Breen	(United Kingdom) Scott Martin	Citroën C3 WRC	MI
12	(France) Citroën Total Abu Dhabi WRT	(Norway) Mads Østberg	(Norway) Torstein Eriksen	Citroën C3 WRC	MI
21	(Czech Republic) MP-Sports	(Czech Republic) Martin Prokop	(Czech Republic) Jan Tománek	Ford Fiesta RS WRC	DM
22	(Saudi Arabia) Yazeed Racing	(Saudi Arabia) Yazeed Al-Rajhi	(United Kingdom) Michael Orr	Ford Fiesta RS WRC	MI
23	(France) "Piano"	(France) "Piano"	(France) Jean-François Pergola	Ford Fiesta RS WRC	DM
24	(France) Cyrille Feraud	(France) Cyrille Feraud	(France) Aymeric Duschemin	Citroën DS3 WRC	DM
World Rally Championship-2 entries
31	(Czech Republic) Škoda Motorsport II	(Czech Republic) Jan Kopecký	(Czech Republic) Pavel Dresler	Škoda Fabia R5	MI
32	(Finland) Tommi Mäkinen Racing	(Japan) Takamoto Katsuta	(Finland) Marko Salminen	Ford Fiesta R5	MI
33	(Czech Republic) Škoda Motorsport II	(Norway) Ole Christian Veiby	(Norway) Stig Rune Skjærmoen	Škoda Fabia R5	MI
34	(Italy) ACI Team Italia WRC	(Italy) Fabio Andolfi	(Italy) Simone Scattolin	Škoda Fabia R5	P
35	(Finland) Printsport	(Poland) Łukasz Pieniążek	(Poland) Przemysław Mazur	Škoda Fabia R5	MI
36	(Italy) BRC Racing Team	(France) Pierre-Louis Loubet	(France) Vincent Landais	Hyundai i20 R5	MI
37	(Finland) Tommi Mäkinen Racing	(Japan) Hiroki Arai	(Finland) Jarmo Lehtinen	Ford Fiesta R5	MI
38	(France) Citroën Total Rallye Team	(France) Stéphane Lefebvre	(France) Gabin Moreau	Citroën C3 R5	MI
39	(France) Nicolas Ciamin	(France) Nicolas Ciamin	(France) Thibault de la Haye	Hyundai i20 R5	MI
40	(Italy) Motorsport Italia	(Mexico) Benito Guerra	(Spain) Borja Rozada	Škoda Fabia R5	P
41	(France) Citroën Total Rallye Team	(Romania) Simone Tempestini	(Romania) Sergiu Itu	Citroën C3 R5	MI
42	(Poland) Lotos Rally Team	(Poland) Kajetan Kajetanowicz	(Poland) Maciej Szczepaniak	Ford Fiesta R5	MI
World Rally Championship-3 entries
61	Équipe de France FFSA Rally	(France) Jean-Baptiste Franceschi	(France) Romain Courbon	Ford Fiesta R2T	MI
62	(Italy) Enrico Brazzoli	(Italy) Enrico Brazzoli	(Italy) Luca Beltrame	Peugeot 208 R2	DM
63	(Finland) Taisko Lario	(Finland) Taisko Lario	(Finland) Tatu Hämäläinen	Peugeot 208 R2	P
64	(United Kingdom) Louise Cook	(United Kingdom) Louise Cook	(United Kingdom) Stefan Davis	Ford Fiesta R2	MI
Other major entries
86	(India) Team MRF Tyres	(India) Gaurav Gill	(Australia) Glenn MacNeall	Ford Fiesta R5	MR

== Report ==
=== Pre-event ===
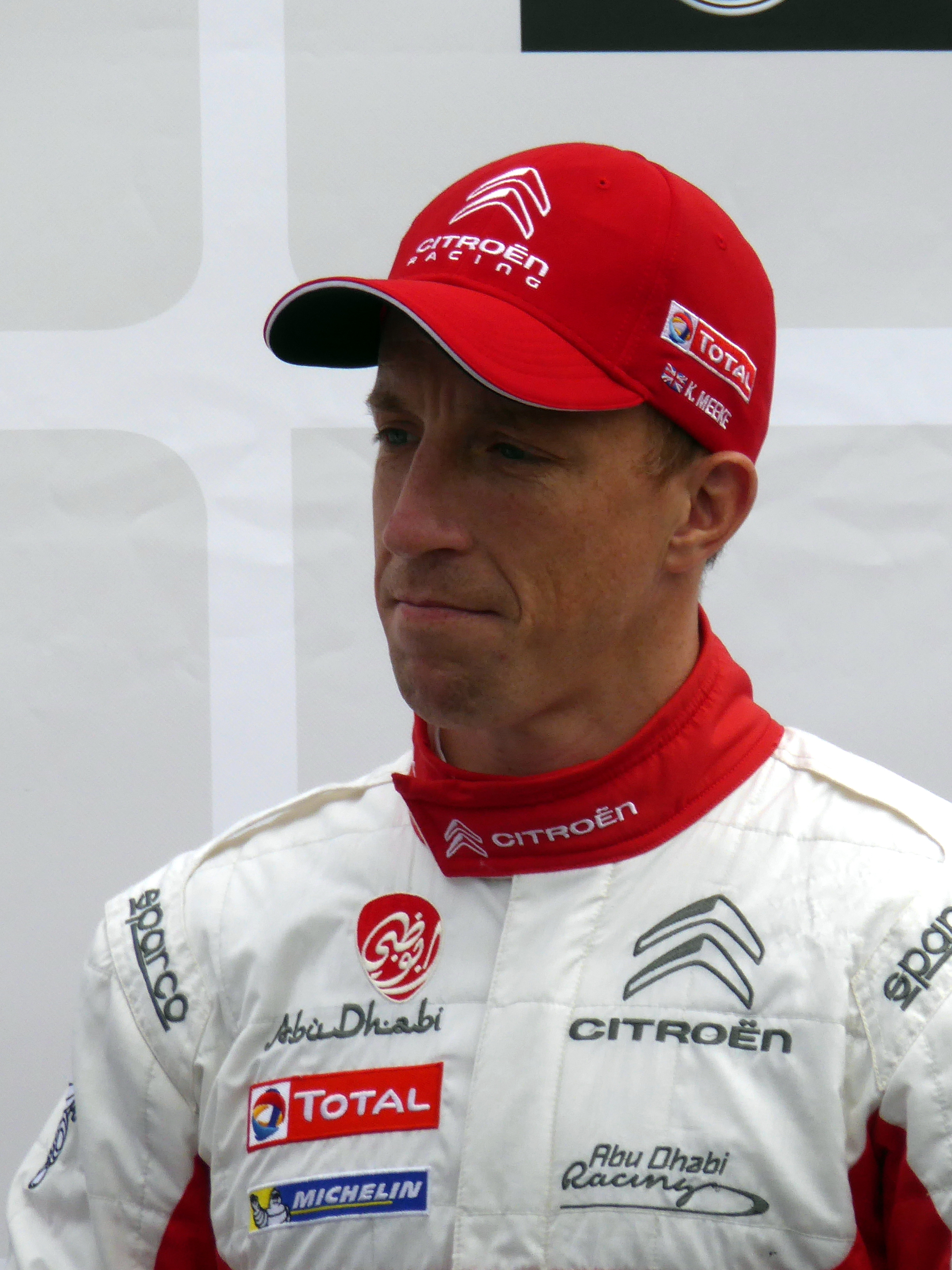
Citroën terminated their contract with Kris Meeke (pictured) and Paul Nagle before the rally.

The Citroën pairing of Kris Meeke and Paul Nagle were entered into the rally, but were subsequently withdrawn when the team released Meeke from his contract. The team did not enter another crew in their place.

=== Thursday ===
Defending world champion Sébastien Ogier, driving a Fiesta, took a slender 0.1 second lead over Andreas Mikkelsen. Championship leader Thierry Neuville was another 0.6 second behind. Elfyn Evans was fourth, followed by Hayden Paddon and Esapekka Lappi. Teammate Teemu Suninen was seventh, while the shakedown winner Jari-Matti Latvala in eighth. Mads Østberg and Ott Tänak were in ninth and tenth respectively to complete the top ten.

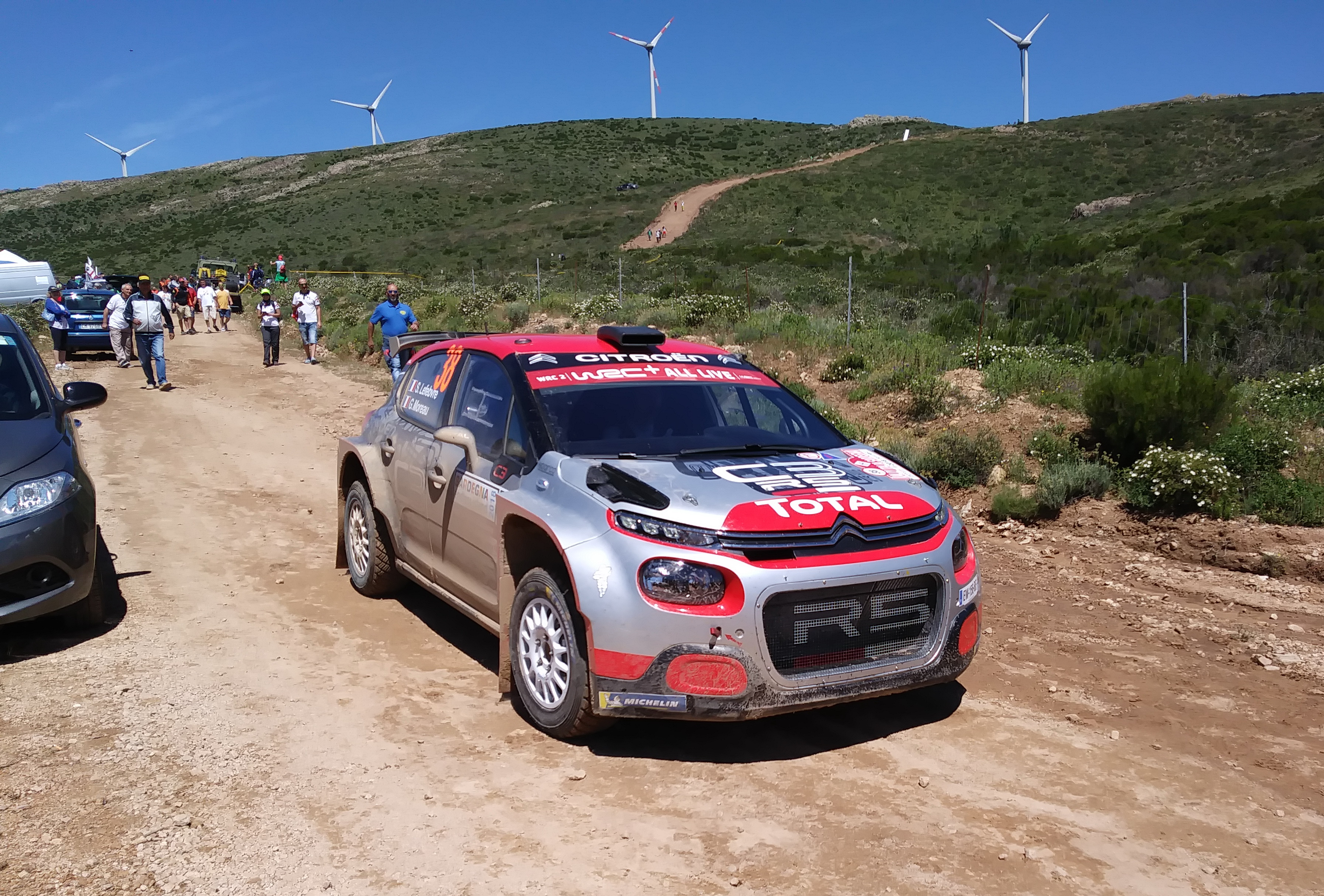
Stéphane Lefebvre led the rally in WRC-2 after Friday.

=== Friday ===
Muddy roads, caused by unpredictable rainy weather, made the first day of Sardegna very tricky. In uncharacteristic conditions, defending world champion Sébastien Ogier took a dramatic lead over the championship leader Thierry Neuville by 18.9 seconds after Andreas Mikkelsen retired from the day due to gearbox issue. Because of teammate Teemu Suninen's off-road and Ott Tänak's radiator damage caused by a heavy bump, Jari-Matti Latvala climbed up to the podium place, followed by his teammate Esapekka Lappi, another 4.4 seconds behind. Two Citroën drivers Mads Østberg and Craig Breen were in sixth and eighth respectively, sandwiched Hayden Paddon in a Hyundai i20. Elfyn Evans dropped out of top twenty after breaking a steering arm due to hitting a rock in his Ford Fiesta. WRC-2 category leader Stéphane Lefebvre, Jan Kopecký and Nicolas Ciamin completed the leaderboard.

=== Saturday ===
After a fifteen-stage fight, title rivals Sébastien Ogier and Thierry Neuville only separated by 3.9 seconds on the top. Jari-Matti Latvala, eighth overall, originally ended the day in third, but an alternator problem forced him to retired from the day, which made his teammate Esapekka Lappi snatch the podium place. Hayden Paddon and Mads Østberg presented us another great fight. Eventually, the Hyundai edged the Citroën by only 2.1 seconds. Craig Breen was in sixth, over a minute further behind, with WRC-2 category leader Jan Kopecký in seventh. Ott Tänak, who was running under Rally2 regulations, recovered to ninth after yesterday's engine damage, followed by Martin Prokop completed the top ten.

=== Sunday ===
The fastest times of the morning stages were all taken by the championship leader Thierry Neuville, which reduced the gap between the rally leader Sébastien Ogier to just 0.8 second. In the Power Stage, the Hyundai star took another stage win and overtook the defending world champion to snatch the victory from Ogier. The difference between two title rivals was only 0.7 second, the third tightest winning margin in WRC history, which shared with 2017 Rally Argentina. Esapekka Lappi ran out of the podium place in a Yaris, followed by Hayden Paddon in fourth overall. Two Citroën drivers Mads Østberg and Craig Breen were in fifth and sixth respectively, ahead of Jari-Matti Latvala, who was running under Rally2 regulations. WRC-2 category leader Jan Kopecký was in eighth after Ott Tänak received a forty-second penalty due to a four-minute late, while Teemu Suninen completed the top ten.

== Classification ==
=== Top ten finishers ===
The following crews finished the rally in each class's top ten. (Note: Only crews contesting the World Rally Championship, World Rally Championship-2 and World Rally Championship-3 are listed.)

Position		No.	Driver	Co-driver	Entrant	Car	Time	Difference	Points	
Event	Class	No.	Driver	Co-driver	Entrant	Car	Time	Difference	Class	Stage
Overall classification
1	1	5	(Belgium) Thierry Neuville	(Belgium) Nicolas Gilsoul	(South Korea) Hyundai Shell Mobis WRT	Hyundai i20 Coupe WRC	3:29:18.7	0.0	25	5
2	2	1	(France) Sébastien Ogier	(France) Julien Ingrassia	(United Kingdom) M-Sport Ford WRT	Ford Fiesta WRC	3:29:19.4	+0.7	18	4
3	3	9	(Finland) Esapekka Lappi	(Finland) Janne Ferm	(Japan) Toyota Gazoo Racing WRT	Toyota Yaris WRC	3:31:15.0	+1:56.3	15	0
4	4	6	(New Zealand) Hayden Paddon	(United Kingdom) Sebastian Marshall	(South Korea) Hyundai Shell Mobis WRT	Hyundai i20 Coupe WRC	3:32:13.9	+2:55.2	12	0
5	5	12	(Norway) Mads Østberg	(Norway) Torstein Eriksen	(France) Citroën Total Abu Dhabi WRT	Citroën C3 WRC	3:32:29.6	+3:10.9	10	0
6	6	11	(Republic of Ireland) Craig Breen	(United Kingdom) Scott Martin	(France) Citroën Total Abu Dhabi WRT	Citroën C3 WRC	3:33:50.4	+4:31.7	8	0
7	7	7	(Finland) Jari-Matti Latvala	(Finland) Miikka Anttila	(Japan) Toyota Gazoo Racing WRT	Toyota Yaris WRC	3:40:40.8	+11:22.1	6	0
8	8	37	(Czech Republic) Jan Kopecký	(Czech Republic) Pavel Dresler	(Czech Republic) Škoda Motorsport II	Škoda Fabia R5	3:42:33.3	+13:14.6	4	0
9	9	8	(Estonia) Ott Tänak	(Estonia) Martin Järveoja	(Japan) Toyota Gazoo Racing WRT	Toyota Yaris WRC	3:42:36.9	+13:18.2	2	3
10	10	3	(Finland) Teemu Suninen	(Finland) Mikko Markkula	(United Kingdom) M-Sport Ford WRT	Ford Fiesta WRC	3:44:49.1	+15:30.4	1	0
World Rally Championship-2
8	1	37	(Czech Republic) Jan Kopecký	(Czech Republic) Pavel Dresler	(Czech Republic) Škoda Motorsport II	Škoda Fabia R5	3:42:33.3	0.0	25	—
12	2	33	(Norway) Ole Christian Veiby	(Norway) Stig Rune Skjærmoen	(Czech Republic) Škoda Motorsport II	Škoda Fabia R5	3:45:35.9	+3:02.6	18	—
13	3	39	(France) Nicolas Ciamin	(France) Thibault de la Haye	(France) Nicolas Ciamin	Hyundai i20 R5	3:45:52.0	+3:18.7	15	—
15	4	34	(Italy) Fabio Andolfi	(Italy) Simone Scattolin	(Italy) ACI Team Italia WRC	Škoda Fabia R5	3:49:05.5	+6:32.2	12	—
16	5	35	(Poland) Łukasz Pieniążek	(Poland) Przemysław Mazur	(Finland) Printsport	Škoda Fabia R5	3:49:44.6	+7:11.3	10	—
20	6	40	(Mexico) Benito Guerra	(Spain) Borja Rozada	(Italy) Motorsport Italia	Škoda Fabia R5	4:08:14.4	+25:41.1	8	—
23	7	42	(Poland) Kajetan Kajetanowicz	(Poland) Maciej Szczepaniak	(Poland) Lotos Rally Team	Ford Fiesta R5	4:20:29.1	+37:55.8	6	—
24	8	38	(France) Stéphane Lefebvre	(France) Gabin Moreau	(France) Citroën Total Rallye Team	Citroën C3 R5	4:24:57.7	+42:24.4	4	—
World Rally Championship-3
21	1	61	(France) Jean-Baptiste Franceschi	(France) Romain Courbon	Équipe de France FFSA Rally	Ford Fiesta R2T	4:07:40.2	0.0	25	—
22	2	63	(Finland) Taisko Lario	(Finland) Tatu Hämäläinen	(Finland) Taisko Lario	Peugeot 208 R2	4:10:16.0	+2:35.8	18	—
26	3	64	(United Kingdom) Louise Cook	(United Kingdom) Stefan Davis	(United Kingdom) Louise Cook	Ford Fiesta R2	4:32:32.1	+24:51.9	15	—
30	4	62	(Italy) Enrico Brazzoli	(Italy) Luca Beltrame	(Italy) Enrico Brazzoli	Peugeot 208 R2	5:17:19.0	+1:09:38.8	12	—

=== Other notable finishers ===
The following notable crews finished the rally outside top ten.

Position		No.	Driver	Co-driver	Entrant	Car	Class	Time	Points
Event	Class	No.	Driver	Co-driver	Entrant	Car	Class	Time	Stage
14	14	3	(United Kingdom) Elfyn Evans	(United Kingdom) Daniel Barritt	(United Kingdom) M-Sport Ford WRT	Ford Fiesta WRC	WRC	3:47:15.2	1
18	18	4	(Norway) Andreas Mikkelsen	(Norway) Anders Jæger-Synnevaag	(South Korea) Hyundai Shell Mobis WRT	Hyundai i20 Coupe WRC	WRC	3:55:07.0	2

=== Special stages ===
Overall classification
Day	Stage	Name	Length	Winner	Car	Time	Class leader
7 June	—	Olmedo [Shakedown]	3.97 km	(Finland) Jari-Matti Latvala	Toyota Yaris WRC	1:53.9	—N/a
7 June	SS1	Ittiri Arena Show	2.00 km	(France) Sébastien Ogier	Ford Fiesta WRC	2:02.7	(France) Sébastien Ogier
8 June	SS2	Tula 1	22.12 km	(Norway) Andreas Mikkelsen	Hyundai i20 Coupe WRC	18:28.1	(Norway) Andreas Mikkelsen
8 June	SS3	Castelsardo 1	14.37 km	(Norway) Andreas Mikkelsen	Hyundai i20 Coupe WRC	10:43.3	(Norway) Andreas Mikkelsen
8 June	SS4	Tergu – Osilo 1	14.14 km	(Estonia) Ott Tänak	Toyota Yaris WRC	8:58.4	(Norway) Andreas Mikkelsen
8 June	SS5	Monte Baranta 1	11.46 km	(Belgium) Thierry Neuville	Hyundai i20 Coupe WRC	8:12.8	(Norway) Andreas Mikkelsen
8 June	SS6	Tula 2	22.12 km	(France) Sébastien Ogier	Ford Fiesta WRC	19:24.0	(France) Sébastien Ogier
8 June	SS7	Castelsardo 2	14.37 km	(Finland) Teemu Suninen	Ford Fiesta WRC	10:34.8	(France) Sébastien Ogier
8 June	SS8	Tergu – Osilo 2	14.14 km	(Belgium) Thierry Neuville	Hyundai i20 Coupe WRC	8:53.5	(France) Sébastien Ogier
8 June	SS9	Monte Baranta 2	11.16 km	(Finland) Jari-Matti Latvala	Toyota Yaris WRC	8:07.2	(France) Sébastien Ogier
9 June	SS10	Coiluna - Loelle 1	14.95 km	(Estonia) Ott Tänak	Toyota Yaris WRC	7:51.4	(France) Sébastien Ogier
9 June	SS11	Monti di Alà 1	28.52 km	(France) Sébastien Ogier	Ford Fiesta WRC	16:38.9	(France) Sébastien Ogier
9 June	SS12	Monte Lerno 1	28.89 km	(Belgium) Thierry Neuville	Hyundai i20 Coupe WRC	17:59.1	(France) Sébastien Ogier
9 June	SS13	Città di Ittiri - Coros	1.42 km	(Finland) Esapekka Lappi	Toyota Yaris WRC	1:29.0	(France) Sébastien Ogier
9 June	SS14	Coiluna – Loelle 2	14.95 km	(France) Sébastien Ogier	Ford Fiesta WRC	7:42.8	(France) Sébastien Ogier
9 June	SS15	Monti di Alà 2	28.52 km	(Belgium) Thierry Neuville	Hyundai i20 Coupe WRC	16:27.3	(France) Sébastien Ogier
9 June	SS16	Monte Lerno 2	28.89 km	(Belgium) Thierry Neuville	Hyundai i20 Coupe WRC	17:49.1	(France) Sébastien Ogier
10 June	SS17	Cala Flumini 1	14.06 km	(Belgium) Thierry Neuville	Hyundai i20 Coupe WRC	8:40.7	(France) Sébastien Ogier
10 June	SS18	Sassari – Argentiera 1	6.96 km	(Belgium) Thierry Neuville	Hyundai i20 Coupe WRC	4:55.4	(France) Sébastien Ogier
10 June	SS19	Cala Flumini 2	14.06 km	(Belgium) Thierry Neuville	Hyundai i20 Coupe WRC	8:28.9	(France) Sébastien Ogier
10 June	SS20	Sassari – Argentiera 2 [Power stage]	6.96 km	(Belgium) Thierry Neuville	Hyundai i20 Coupe WRC	4:52.9	(Belgium) Thierry Neuville
World Rally Championship-2
7 June	—	Olmedo [Shakedown]	3.97 km	(Norway) Ole Christian Veiby (France) Stéphane Lefebvre	Škoda Fabia R5; Citroën C3 R5	2:03.8	—N/a
7 June	SS1	Ittiri Arena Show	2.00 km	(Norway) Ole Christian Veiby	Škoda Fabia R5	2:08.2	(Norway) Ole Christian Veiby
8 June	SS2	Tula 1	22.12 km	(France) Pierre-Louis Loubet	Hyundai i20 R5	19:11.2	(France) Stéphane Lefebvre
8 June	SS3	Castelsardo 1	14.37 km	(Japan) Hiroki Arai	Ford Fiesta R5	11:11.2	(Japan) Hiroki Arai
8 June	SS4	Tergu – Osilo 1	14.14 km	(Norway) Ole Christian Veiby	Škoda Fabia R5	9:19.7	(Norway) Ole Christian Veiby
8 June	SS5	Monte Baranta 1	11.46 km	(France) Stéphane Lefebvre	Citroën C3 R5	8:38.9	(Norway) Ole Christian Veiby
8 June	SS6	Tula 2	22.12 km	(Czech Republic) Jan Kopecký	Škoda Fabia R5	20:13.5	(France) Stéphane Lefebvre
8 June	SS7	Castelsardo 2	14.37 km	(France) Stéphane Lefebvre	Citroën C3 R5	11:04.0	(France) Stéphane Lefebvre
8 June	SS8	Tergu – Osilo 2	14.14 km	(Czech Republic) Jan Kopecký	Škoda Fabia R5	9:22.6	(France) Stéphane Lefebvre
8 June	SS9	Monte Baranta 2	11.16 km	(France) Stéphane Lefebvre	Citroën C3 R5	8:25.0	(France) Stéphane Lefebvre
9 June	SS10	Monte Lerno 1	14.95 km	(Norway) Ole Christian Veiby	Škoda Fabia R5	8:24.9	(France) Stéphane Lefebvre
9 June	SS11	Monti di Alà 1	28.52 km	(Norway) Ole Christian Veiby	Škoda Fabia R5	17:47.6	(Czech Republic) Jan Kopecký
9 June	SS12	Coiluna – Loelle 1	28.89 km	(Norway) Ole Christian Veiby	Škoda Fabia R5	19:18.7	(Czech Republic) Jan Kopecký
9 June	SS13	Ittiri Arena	1.42 km	(Norway) Ole Christian Veiby	Škoda Fabia R5	1:31.1	(Czech Republic) Jan Kopecký
9 June	SS14	Coiluna – Loelle 2	14.95 km	(Czech Republic) Jan Kopecký	Škoda Fabia R5	8:17.5	(Czech Republic) Jan Kopecký
9 June	SS15	Monte Lerno 2	28.52 km	(Norway) Ole Christian Veiby	Škoda Fabia R5	17:37.9	(Czech Republic) Jan Kopecký
9 June	SS16	Monti di Alà 2	28.89 km	(Norway) Ole Christian Veiby	Škoda Fabia R5	19:05.2	(Czech Republic) Jan Kopecký
10 June	SS17	Cala Flumini 1	14.06 km	(Norway) Ole Christian Veiby	Škoda Fabia R5	9:15.9	(Czech Republic) Jan Kopecký
10 June	SS18	Sassari – Argentiera 1	6.96 km	(Norway) Ole Christian Veiby	Škoda Fabia R5	5:17.4	(Czech Republic) Jan Kopecký
10 June	SS19	Cala Flumini 2	14.06 km	(Norway) Ole Christian Veiby	Škoda Fabia R5	9:09.0	(Czech Republic) Jan Kopecký
10 June	SS20	Sassari – Argentiera 2	6.96 km	(France) Stéphane Lefebvre	Citroën C3 R5	5:13.2	(Czech Republic) Jan Kopecký
World Rally Championship-3
7 June	—	Olmedo [Shakedown]	3.97 km	(France) Jean-Baptiste Franceschi (Finland) Taisko Lario	Ford Fiesta R2T; Peugeot 208 R2	2:22.4	—N/a
7 June	SS1	Ittiri Arena Show	2.00 km	(France) Jean-Baptiste Franceschi	Ford Fiesta R2T	2:32.8	(France) Jean-Baptiste Franceschi
8 June	SS2	Tula 1	22.12 km	(France) Jean-Baptiste Franceschi	Ford Fiesta R2T	21:59.3	(France) Jean-Baptiste Franceschi
8 June	SS3	Castelsardo 1	14.37 km	(France) Jean-Baptiste Franceschi	Ford Fiesta R2T	12:42.4	(France) Jean-Baptiste Franceschi
8 June	SS4	Tergu – Osilo 1	14.14 km	(France) Jean-Baptiste Franceschi	Ford Fiesta R2T	10:31.2	(France) Jean-Baptiste Franceschi
8 June	SS5	Monte Baranta 1	11.46 km	(France) Jean-Baptiste Franceschi	Ford Fiesta R2T	9:46.5	(France) Jean-Baptiste Franceschi
8 June	SS6	Tula 2	22.12 km	(Finland) Taisko Lario	Peugeot 208 R2	22:43.6	(Finland) Taisko Lario
8 June	SS7	Castelsardo 2	14.37 km	(France) Jean-Baptiste Franceschi	Ford Fiesta R2T	12:18.7	(Finland) Taisko Lario
8 June	SS8	Tergu – Osilo 2	14.14 km	(Finland) Taisko Lario	Peugeot 208 R2	10:07.6	(Finland) Taisko Lario
8 June	SS9	Monte Baranta 2	11.16 km	(France) Jean-Baptiste Franceschi	Ford Fiesta R2T	9:22.7	(Finland) Taisko Lario
9 June	SS10	Monte Lerno 1	14.95 km	(France) Jean-Baptiste Franceschi	Ford Fiesta R2T	9:26.5	(Finland) Taisko Lario
9 June	SS11	Monti di Alà 1	28.52 km	(France) Jean-Baptiste Franceschi	Ford Fiesta R2T	19:53.4	(France) Jean-Baptiste Franceschi
9 June	SS12	Coiluna – Loelle 1	28.89 km	(France) Jean-Baptiste Franceschi	Ford Fiesta R2T	21:26.3	(France) Jean-Baptiste Franceschi
9 June	SS13	Ittiri Arena	1.42 km	(France) Jean-Baptiste Franceschi	Ford Fiesta R2T	1:43.5	(France) Jean-Baptiste Franceschi
9 June	SS14	Coiluna – Loelle 2	14.95 km	(France) Jean-Baptiste Franceschi	Ford Fiesta R2T	9:14.9	(France) Jean-Baptiste Franceschi
9 June	SS15	Monte Lerno 2	28.52 km	(France) Jean-Baptiste Franceschi	Ford Fiesta R2T	19:35.3	(France) Jean-Baptiste Franceschi
9 June	SS16	Monti di Alà 2	28.89 km	(France) Jean-Baptiste Franceschi	Ford Fiesta R2T	22:06.3	(France) Jean-Baptiste Franceschi
10 June	SS17	Cala Flumini 1	14.06 km	(France) Jean-Baptiste Franceschi	Ford Fiesta R2T	10:38.3	(France) Jean-Baptiste Franceschi
10 June	SS18	Sassari – Argentiera 1	6.96 km	(Finland) Taisko Lario	Peugeot 208 R2	6:16.4	(France) Jean-Baptiste Franceschi
10 June	SS19	Cala Flumini 2	14.06 km	(France) Jean-Baptiste Franceschi	Ford Fiesta R2T	11:11.7	(France) Jean-Baptiste Franceschi
10 June	SS20	Sassari – Argentiera 2	6.96 km	(Finland) Taisko Lario	Peugeot 208 R2	6:22.3	(France) Jean-Baptiste Franceschi

=== Power stage ===
The Power stage was a 6.96 km stage at the end of the rally. Additional World Championship points were awarded to the five fastest crews.

Pos.	Driver	Co-driver	Car	Time	Diff.	Pts.
1	(Belgium) Thierry Neuville	(Belgium) Nicolas Gilsoul	Hyundai i20 Coupe WRC	4:52.9	0.0	5
2	(France) Sébastien Ogier	(France) Julien Ingrassia	Ford Fiesta WRC	4:54.4	+1.5	4
3	(Estonia) Ott Tänak	(Estonia) Martin Järveoja	Toyota Yaris WRC	4:54.5	+1.6	3
4	(Norway) Andreas Mikkelsen	(Norway) Anders Jæger-Synnevaag	Hyundai i20 Coupe WRC	4:55.4	+2.4	2
5	(United Kingdom) Elfyn Evans	(United Kingdom) Daniel Barritt	Ford Fiesta WRC	4:57.2	+4.3	1

=== Penalties ===
The following notable crews were given time penalty during the rally.

Stage	No.	Driver	Co-driver	Entrant	Car	Class	Reason	Penalty
SS1	24	(France) Cyrille Feraud	(France) Aymeric Duschemin	(France) Cyrille Feraud	Citroën DS3 WRC	WRC	1 minute early	1:00
SS1	42	(Poland) Kajetan Kajetanowicz	(Poland) Maciej Szczepaniak	(Poland) Lotos Rally Team	Ford Fiesta R5	WRC-2	Jump start	0:10
SS7	62	(Italy) Enrico Brazzoli	(Italy) Luca Beltrame	(Italy) Enrico Brazzoli	Peugeot 208 R2	WRC-3	6 minutes late	1:00
SS8	36	(France) Pierre-Louis Loubet	(France) Vincent Landais	(Italy) BRC Racing Team	Hyundai i20 R5	WRC-2	1 minute late	0:10
SS9	33	(Norway) Ole Christian Veiby	(Norway) Stig Rune Skjærmoen	(Czech Republic) Škoda Motorsport II	Škoda Fabia R5	WRC-2	1 minute late	0:10
SS12	23	(France) "Piano"	(France) Jean-François Pergola	(France) "Piano"	Ford Fiesta RS WRC	WRC	14 minutes late	2:20
SS13	22	(Saudi Arabia) Yazeed Al-Rajhi	(United Kingdom) Michael Orr	(Saudi Arabia) Yazeed Racing	Ford Fiesta RS WRC	WRC	7 minutes late	1:10
SS15	36	(France) Pierre-Louis Loubet	(France) Vincent Landais	(Italy) BRC Racing Team	Hyundai i20 R5	WRC-2	8 minutes late	1:20
SS15	44	(Finland) Max Vatanen	(France) Christopher Guieu	(Finland) Max Vatanen	Hyundai i20 R5	WRC-2	9 minutes late	1:30
SS17	32	(Japan) Takamoto Katsuta	(Finland) Marko Salminen	(Finland) Tommi Mäkinen Racing	Ford Fiesta R5	WRC-2	9 minutes late	1:30
SS19	61	(France) Jean-Baptiste Franceschi	(France) Romain Courbon	(France) Jean-Baptiste Franceschi	Ford Fiesta R2T	WRC-3	16 minutes late	2:40
SS20	38	(France) Stéphane Lefebvre	(France) Gabin Moreau	(France) Citroën Total Rallye Team	Citroën C3 R5	WRC-2	6 minutes late	1:00

=== Retirements ===
The following notable crews retired from the event. Under Rally2 regulations, they were eligible to re-enter the event starting from the next leg. Crews that re-entered were given an additional time penalty.

Stage	No.	Driver	Co-driver	Entrant	Car	Class	Cause	Re-entry
SS3	23	(France) "Piano"	(France) Jean-François Pergola	(France) "Piano"	Ford Fiesta RS WRC	WRC	Mechanical	Yes
SS5	37	(Japan) Hiroki Arai	(Finland) Jarmo Lehtinen	(Finland) Tommi Mäkinen Racing	Ford Fiesta R5	WRC-2	Accident	No
SS6	41	(Romania) Simone Tempestini	(Romania) Sergiu Itu	(France) Citroën Total Rallye Team	Citroën C3 R5	WRC-2	Mechanical	Yes
SS6	42	(Poland) Kajetan Kajetanowicz	(Poland) Maciej Szczepaniak	(Poland) Lotos Rally Team	Ford Fiesta R5	WRC-2	Mechanical	Yes
SS7	4	(Norway) Andreas Mikkelsen	(Norway) Anders Jæger-Synnevaag	(South Korea) Hyundai Shell Mobis WRT	Hyundai i20 Coupe WRC	WRC	Gearbox	Yes
SS7	62	(Italy) Enrico Brazzoli	(Italy) Luca Beltrame	(Italy) Enrico Brazzoli	Peugeot 208 R2	WRC-3	Mechanical	Yes
SS9	8	(Estonia) Ott Tänak	(Estonia) Martin Järveoja	(Japan) Toyota Gazoo Racing WRT	Toyota Yaris WRC	WRC	Radiator	Yes
SS9	3	(Finland) Teemu Suninen	(Finland) Mikko Markkula	(United Kingdom) M-Sport Ford WRT	Ford Fiesta WRC	WRC	Off-road	Yes
SS11	38	(France) Stéphane Lefebvre	(France) Gabin Moreau	(France) Citroën Total Rallye Team	Citroën C3 R5	WRC-2	Mechanical	Yes
SS12	62	(Italy) Enrico Brazzoli	(Italy) Luca Beltrame	(Italy) Enrico Brazzoli	Peugeot 208 R2	WRC-3	Mechanical	Yes
SS14	40	(Mexico) Benito Guerra	(Spain) Borja Rozada	(Italy) Motorsport Italia	Škoda Fabia R5	WRC-2	Mechanical	Yes
SS15	22	(Saudi Arabia) Yazeed Al-Rajhi	(United Kingdom) Michael Orr	(Saudi Arabia) Yazeed Racing	Ford Fiesta RS WRC	WRC	Mechanical	No
SS15	41	(Romania) Simone Tempestini	(Romania) Sergiu Itu	(France) Citroën Total Rallye Team	Citroën C3 R5	WRC-2	Accident	No
SS16	7	(Finland) Jari-Matti Latvala	(Finland) Miikka Anttila	(Japan) Toyota Gazoo Racing WRT	Toyota Yaris WRC	WRC	Alternator	Yes
SS16	24	(France) Cyrille Feraud	(France) Aymeric Duschemin	(France) Cyrille Feraud	Citroën DS3 WRC	WRC	Mechanical	No
SS18	32	(Japan) Takamoto Katsuta	(Finland) Marko Salminen	(Finland) Tommi Mäkinen Racing	Ford Fiesta R5	WRC-2	Driveshaft	No
SS20	36	(France) Pierre-Louis Loubet	(France) Vincent Landais	(Italy) BRC Racing Team	Hyundai i20 R5	WRC-2	Withdrawn	No

=== Championship standings after the rally ===
==== Drivers' championships ====
World Rally Championship
	Pos.	Driver	Points
	1	(Belgium) Thierry Neuville	149
	2	(France) Sébastien Ogier	122
	3	(Estonia) Ott Tänak	77
1	4	(Finland) Esapekka Lappi	70
1	5	(Spain) Dani Sordo	60
World Rally Championship-2
	Pos.	Driver	Points
	1	(Sweden) Pontus Tidemand	93
	2	(Czech Republic) Jan Kopecký	75
4	3	(Norway) Ole Christian Veiby	45
1	4	(United Kingdom) Gus Greensmith	40
	5	(Poland) Łukasz Pieniążek	40
World Rally Championship-3
	Pos.	Driver	Points
2	1	(France) Jean-Baptiste Franceschi	64
1	2	(Sweden) Denis Rådström	62
1	3	(Sweden) Emil Bergkvist	43
	4	(Italy) Enrico Brazzoli	37
1	5	(Finland) Taisko Lario	37

==== Co-Drivers' championships ====
World Rally Championship
	Pos.	Co-Driver	Points
	1	(Belgium) Nicolas Gilsoul	149
	2	(France) Julien Ingrassia	122
	3	(Estonia) Martin Järveoja	77
1	4	(Finland) Janne Ferm	70
1	5	(Spain) Carlos del Barrio	60
World Rally Championship-2
	Pos.	Co-Driver	Points
	1	(Sweden) Jonas Andersson	93
	2	(Czech Republic) Pavel Dresler	75
4	3	(Norway) Stig Rune Skjærmoen	45
1	4	(United Kingdom) Craig Parry	40
	5	(Poland) Przemysław Mazur	40
World Rally Championship-3
	Pos.	Co-Driver	Points
1	1	(France) Romain Courbon	64
1	2	(Sweden) Johan Johansson	62
2	3	(Italy) Luca Beltrame	37
2	4	(Finland) Tatu Hämäläinen	37
2	5	(Norway) Ola Fløene	33

==== Manufacturers' and teams' championships ====
World Rally Championship
	Pos.	Manufacturer	Points
	1	(South Korea) Hyundai Shell Mobis WRT	212
	2	(United Kingdom) M-Sport Ford WRT	184
	3	(Japan) Toyota Gazoo Racing WRT	161
	4	(France) Citroën Total Abu Dhabi WRT	129
World Rally Championship-2
	Pos.	Team	Points
	1	(Czech Republic) Škoda Motorsport	93
	2	(Czech Republic) Škoda Motorsport II	75
1	3	(Finland) Printsport	58
1	4	(Finland) Tommi Mäkinen Racing	45
2	5	(Italy) ACI Team Italia WRC	38
World Rally Championship-3
	Pos.	Team	Points
	1	(Italy) ACI Team Italia	58
	2	(Germany) ADAC Sachsen	47
	3	(Estonia) OT Racing	37
3	4	Équipe de France FFSA Rally	37
1	5	(Turkey) Castrol Ford Team Turkiye	30

== Notes ==
Previous rally: 2018 Rally de Portugal	2018 FIA World Rally Championship	Next rally: 2018 Rally Finland
Previous rally: 2017 Rally Italia Sardegna	2018 Rally Italia Sardegna	Next rally: 2019 Rally Italia Sardegna
