= 2018 World Rally Championship =

46th season of the World Rally Championship

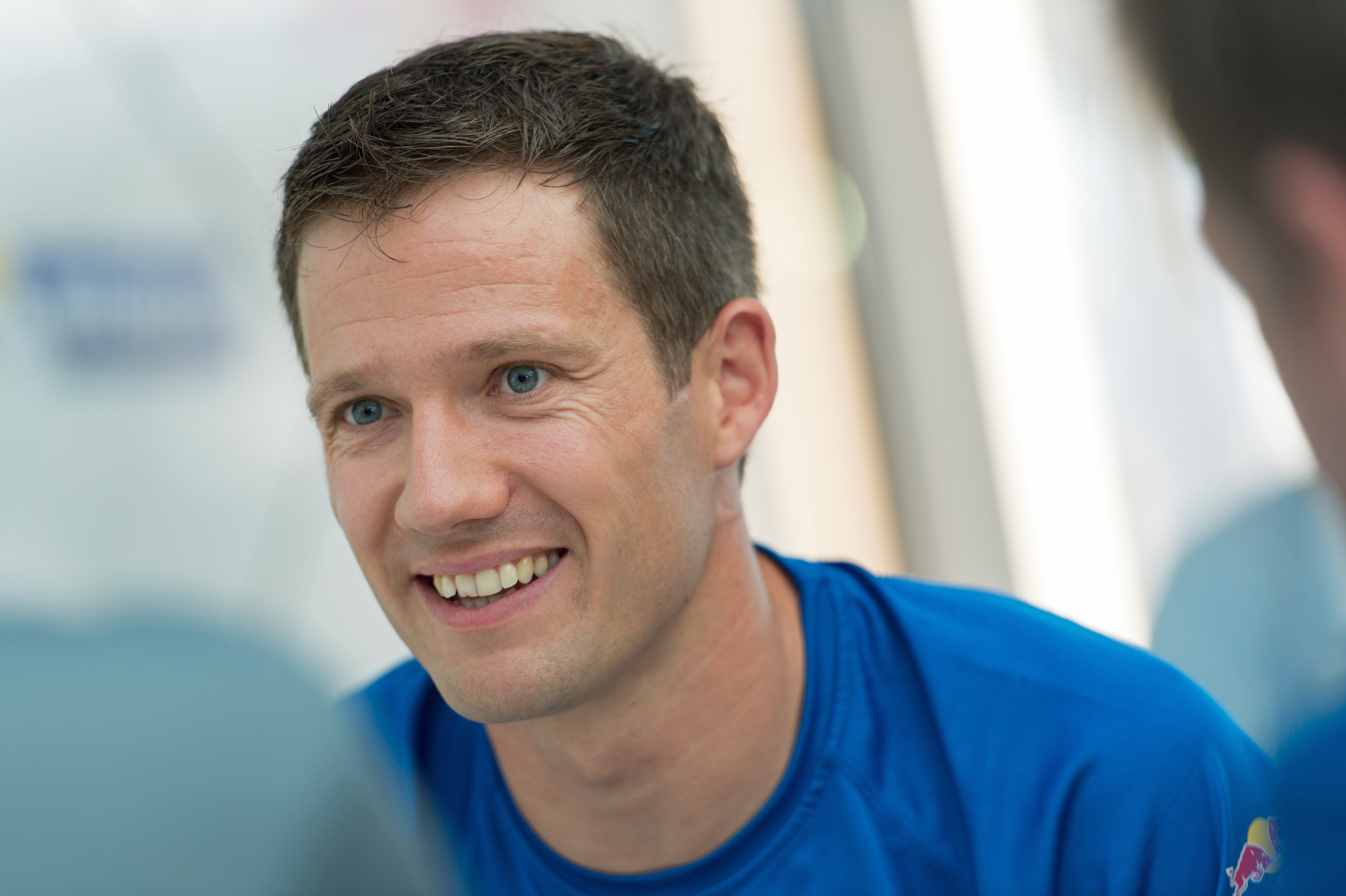
Sébastien Ogier won his sixth Drivers' Championship title.

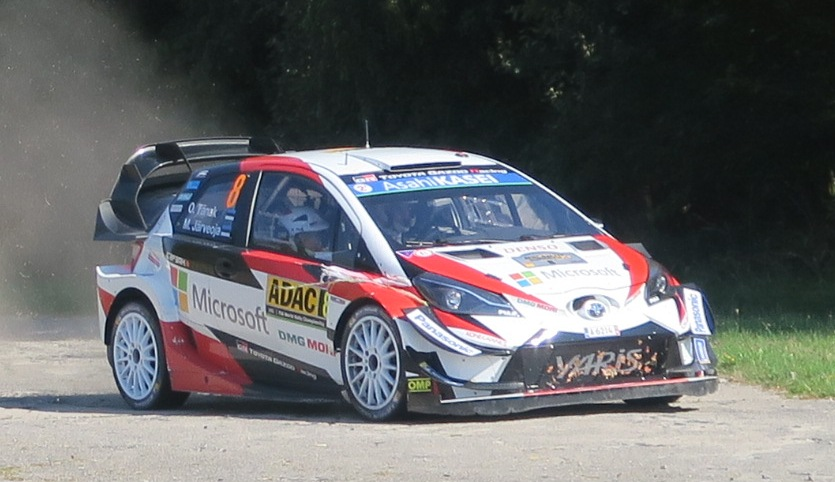
Toyota Gazoo Racing WRT (Yaris WRC pictured) won the Manufacturers' championship.

The 2018 FIA World Rally Championship was the 46th season of the World Rally Championship, a rallying championship recognised by the Fédération Internationale de l'Automobile (FIA) as the highest class of international rallying. Teams and crews were competing in thirteen events—starting with the Monte Carlo Rally in January and finishing with Rally Australia in November—for the World Rally Championships for Drivers, Co-drivers and Manufacturers. Crews were free to compete in cars complying with World Rally Car and Group R regulations; however, only Manufacturers competing with 2017-specification World Rally Cars were eligible to score points in the Manufacturers' championship. The series were once again supported by the WRC2 and WRC3 categories at every round and by the Junior WRC at selected rounds.

Sébastien Ogier and Julien Ingrassia started the season as the defending drivers' and co-drivers' champions after securing their fifth consecutive World Championship titles at the 2017 Wales Rally GB. M-Sport, the team they drove for in 2017, were the defending manufacturers' champions.

At the conclusion of the championship, Ogier and Ingrassia successfully defended their championship titles for the fifth time in their career and rewrote the title figure to six. Thierry Neuville and Nicolas Gilsoul finished the season as the runners-up, eighteen points behind the six-time world champions, while Ott Tänak and Martin Järveoja placed third, a further twenty points behind. In the World Championship for Manufacturers, Toyota Gazoo Racing WRT won their first World Championship title since 1999. Hyundai World Rally Team finished second overall twenty-seven points behind Toyota, with defending manufacturers' champions M-Sport World Rally Team in third.

== Calendar ==
The championship was contested over thirteen rounds in Europe, the Middle East, the Americas and Oceania.

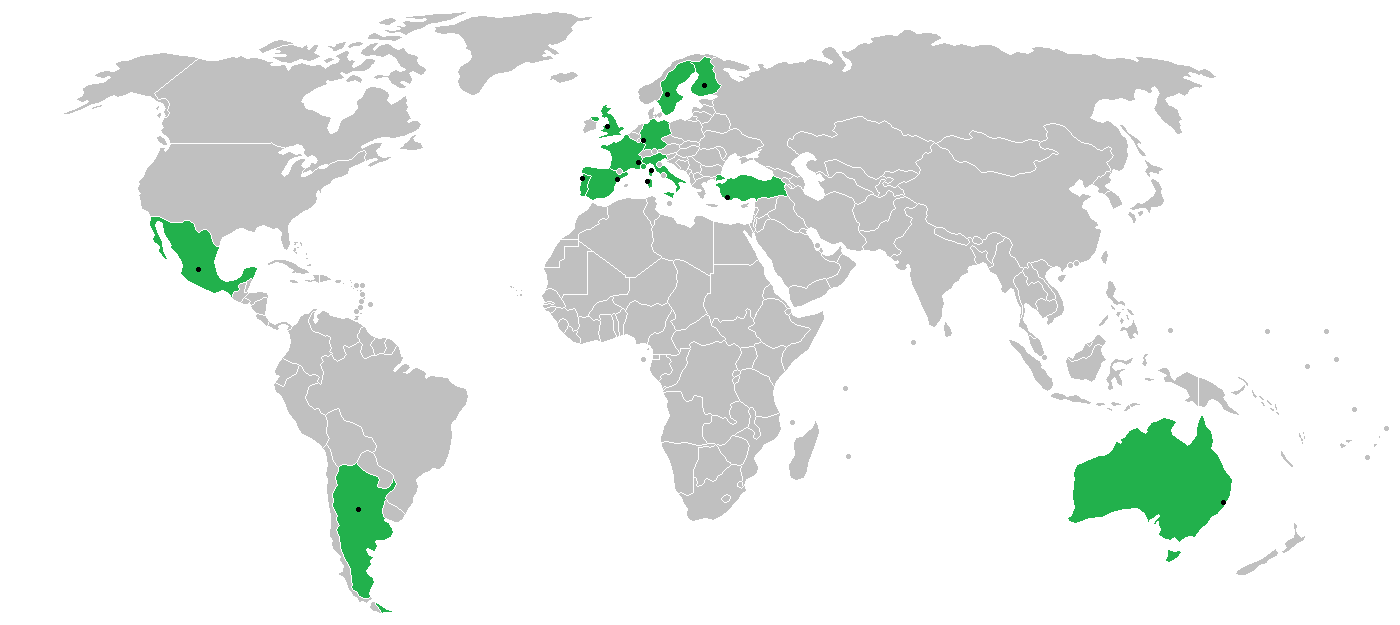
A map showing the locations of the rallies in the 2018 World Rally Championship season.

Round	Dates		Rally	Rally headquarters	Rally details		
Round	Start	Finish	Rally	Rally headquarters	Surface	Stages	Distance
1	25 January	28 January	(Monaco) Rallye Automobile Monte Carlo	Gap, Provence-Alpes-Côte d'Azur (Note: The rally base of the Monte Carlo Rally was located in France.)	Mixed (Note: Rallye Monte Carlo was run on a tarmac and snow surface.)	17	394.74 km
2	15 February	18 February	Rally Sweden	Torsby, Värmland	Snow	19	314.25 km
3	8 March	11 March	(Mexico) Rally Guanajuato México	León, Guanajuato	Gravel	22	344.49 km
4	5 April	8 April	(France) Tour de Corse	Bastia, Haute-Corse	Tarmac	12	333.48 km
5	26 April	29 April	Rally Argentina	Villa Carlos Paz, Córdoba	Gravel	18	358.25 km
6	17 May	20 May	Rally de Portugal	Matosinhos, Porto	Gravel	20	358.19 km
7	7 June	10 June	(Italy) Rally Italia Sardegna	Alghero, Sardinia	Gravel	20	313.46 km
8	26 July	29 July	Rally Finland	Jyväskylä, Keski-Suomi	Gravel	23	317.26 km
9	16 August	19 August	(Germany) ADAC Rallye Deutschland	Bostalsee, Saarland	Tarmac	18	325.76 km
10	13 September	16 September	Marmaris Rally of Turkey	Marmaris, Muğla	Gravel	17	312.44 km
11	4 October	7 October	(United Kingdom) Wales Rally GB	Deeside, Flintshire	Gravel	23	318.34 km
12	25 October	28 October	(Spain) RACC Rally Catalunya de España	Salou, Tarragona	Mixed (Note: Rally Catalunya was run on a tarmac and gravel surface.)	18	331.58 km
13	15 November	18 November	Rally Australia	Coffs Harbour, New South Wales	Gravel	24	318.64 km

=== Calendar changes ===
The Rally of Poland was removed from the calendar after the FIA repeatedly raised concerns about the event's safety. The FIA had previously ordered a review of the event's safety standards ahead of the 2017 event, threatening to rescind the rally's World Championship status if conditions were not improved.

The Rally of Poland was replaced by the Rally of Turkey, which returned to the calendar for the first time since 2010. The event, which was previously based in Istanbul, return to south-western Turkey. It was based in the coastal resort town of Marmaris in Muğla Province, with the route running along the Mediterranean coastline.

The rallies of Great Britain and Catalunya swapped places on the schedule, with Rally Catalunya becoming the penultimate round of the championship. Rallye Deutschland relocated to a new headquarters with the service park located at the Bostalsee reservoir in Saarland state.

=== Route changes ===
Rallye Monte Carlo featured a heavily revised route from the 2017 event, with half the route being brand new. After starting in Mexico City in 2017, Rally Mexico returned to its traditional start in Guanajuato. The route featured minor changes and included a new Power Stage.

The route for the Tour de Corse was heavily revised, with only two of the seven stages being run as they were in 2017. The headquarters of the event was relocated to Bastia, which hosted the event for the first time since 1978.

Organisers of the Wales Rally GB announced plans for a heavily revised route. The changes were made possible by the passage of legislation by the British government allowing public roads to be used for motorsport.

== Entries ==
The following teams and crews were entered in the 2018 FIA World Rally Championship.

World Rally Car entries eligible to score manufacturer points
Manufacturer	Entrant	Car	Tyre	No.	Driver name	Co-driver name	Rounds
Ford	(United Kingdom) M-Sport Ford WRT	Ford Fiesta WRC	M	1	(France) Sébastien Ogier	(France) Julien Ingrassia	All
Ford	(United Kingdom) M-Sport Ford WRT	Ford Fiesta WRC	M	2	(United Kingdom) Elfyn Evans	(United Kingdom) Daniel Barritt	1–3, 5–13
Ford	(United Kingdom) M-Sport Ford WRT	Ford Fiesta WRC	M	2	(United Kingdom) Elfyn Evans	(United Kingdom) Phil Mills	4
Ford	(United Kingdom) M-Sport Ford WRT	Ford Fiesta WRC	M	3	(France) Bryan Bouffier	(France) Xavier Panseri	1, 4
Ford	(United Kingdom) M-Sport Ford WRT	Ford Fiesta WRC	M	3	(Finland) Teemu Suninen	(Finland) Mikko Markkula	2–3, 5–13
Hyundai	(South Korea) Hyundai Shell Mobis WRT	Hyundai i20 Coupe WRC	M	4	(Norway) Andreas Mikkelsen	(Norway) Anders Jæger-Synnevaag	All
Hyundai	(South Korea) Hyundai Shell Mobis WRT	Hyundai i20 Coupe WRC	M	5	(Belgium) Thierry Neuville	(Belgium) Nicolas Gilsoul	All
Hyundai	(South Korea) Hyundai Shell Mobis WRT	Hyundai i20 Coupe WRC	M	6	(Spain) Dani Sordo	(Spain) Carlos del Barrio	1, 3–5, 9, 12
Hyundai	(South Korea) Hyundai Shell Mobis WRT	Hyundai i20 Coupe WRC	M	6	(New Zealand) Hayden Paddon	(United Kingdom) Sebastian Marshall	2, 6–8, 10–11, 13
Toyota	(Japan) Toyota Gazoo Racing WRT	Toyota Yaris WRC	M	7	(Finland) Jari-Matti Latvala	(Finland) Miikka Anttila	All
Toyota	(Japan) Toyota Gazoo Racing WRT	Toyota Yaris WRC	M	8	(Estonia) Ott Tänak	(Estonia) Martin Järveoja	All
Toyota	(Japan) Toyota Gazoo Racing WRT	Toyota Yaris WRC	M	9	(Finland) Esapekka Lappi	(Finland) Janne Ferm	All
Citroën	(France) Citroën Total Abu Dhabi WRT	Citroën C3 WRC	M	10	(United Kingdom) Kris Meeke (Note: Kris Meeke and Paul Nagle were entered into the Rally Italia Sardegna but were withdrawn when Meeke was dismissed from the team.)	(Republic of Ireland) Paul Nagle	1–6
Citroën	(France) Citroën Total Abu Dhabi WRT	Citroën C3 WRC	M	10	(Norway) Mads Østberg	(Norway) Torstein Eriksen	8–11, 13
Citroën	(France) Citroën Total Abu Dhabi WRT	Citroën C3 WRC	M	10	(France) Sébastien Loeb	(Monaco) Daniel Elena	12
Citroën	(France) Citroën Total Abu Dhabi WRT	Citroën C3 WRC	M	11	(Republic of Ireland) Craig Breen	(United Kingdom) Scott Martin	1–2, 5–13
Citroën	(France) Citroën Total Abu Dhabi WRT	Citroën C3 WRC	M	11	(France) Sébastien Loeb	(Monaco) Daniel Elena	3–4
Citroën	(France) Citroën Total Abu Dhabi WRT	Citroën C3 WRC	M	12	(Norway) Mads Østberg	(Norway) Torstein Eriksen	2, 6–7
Citroën	(France) Citroën Total Abu Dhabi WRT	Citroën C3 WRC	M	12	(United Arab Emirates) Khalid Al Qassimi	(United Kingdom) Chris Patterson	5, 8, 10, 12

World Rally Car entries ineligible to score manufacturer points
Manufacturer	Entrant	Car	Tyre	No.	Driver name	Co-driver name	Rounds
Ford	(Norway) Henning Solberg	Ford Fiesta WRC	M	14	(Norway) Henning Solberg	(Norway) Cato Menkerud	2
Ford	(United Kingdom) M-Sport Ford WRT	Ford Fiesta WRC	M	21	(Greece) Jourdan Serderidis	(Belgium) Frédéric Miclotte	9
Ford	(United Kingdom) M-Sport Ford WRT	Ford Fiesta WRC	M	21	(Greece) Jourdan Serderidis	(Belgium) Lara Vanneste	13
Ford	(United States) Hoonigan Racing	Ford Fiesta WRC	M	43	(United States) Ken Block	(Italy) Alex Gelsomino	12
Ford	(Italy) Manuel Villa	Ford Fiesta RS WRC	D	18	(Italy) Manuel Villa	(Italy) Daniele Michi	1
Ford	(Saudi Arabia) Yazeed Racing	Ford Fiesta RS WRC	M	21	(Saudi Arabia) Yazeed Al Rajhi	(United Kingdom) Michael Orr	2, 6, 10
Ford	(Saudi Arabia) Yazeed Racing	Ford Fiesta RS WRC	M	22	(Saudi Arabia) Yazeed Al Rajhi	(United Kingdom) Michael Orr	7
Ford	(Czech Republic) MP-Sports	Ford Fiesta RS WRC	D	21	(Czech Republic) Martin Prokop	(Czech Republic) Jan Tománek	7
Ford	(France) "Piano"	Ford Fiesta RS WRC	D	23	(France) "Piano"	(France) Jean-François Pergola	7
Ford	(France) Armando Pereira	Ford Fiesta RS WRC	P	82	(France) Armando Pereira	(France) Rémi Tutélaire	4
Ford	(France) Alain Vauthier	Ford Fiesta RS WRC	M	83	(France) Alain Vauthier	(France) Stevie Nollet	4
Hyundai	(South Korea) Hyundai Shell Mobis WRT	Hyundai i20 Coupe WRC	M	16	(Spain) Dani Sordo	(Spain) Carlos del Barrio	6
Citroën	(Germany) Marijan Griebel	Citroën DS3 WRC	M	22	(Germany) Marijan Griebel	(Germany) Alexander Rath	9
Citroën	(France) Cyrille Feraud	Citroën DS3 WRC	D	24	(France) Cyrille Feraud	(France) Aymeric Duschemin	7
Citroën	(Italy) Mauro Miele	Citroën DS3 WRC	M	81	(Italy) Mauro Miele	(Italy) Luca Beltrame	4
Citroën	(France) Jean-Michel Raoux	Citroën DS3 WRC	M	83	(France) Jean-Michel Raoux	(France) Laurent Magat	12

=== Team changes ===
Citroën reduced its commitment to two full-time entries, with a third car entered at selected events. At the same time, the C3 WRC made available to privateer entrants. The cars are leased to drivers but their operation is run by Citroën Racing's sister team PH Sport, allowing Citroën to retain control over the cars.

Ford increased its factory support for M-Sport's programme, with the team officially known as "M-Sport Ford World Rally Team". Their support includes engine, chassis and aerodynamic development. Ford is recognised as the manufacturer entry, marking the company's return to the sport for the first time since 2012. Ford's support extends to M-Sport's WRC2 programme.

Tyre supplier DMACK scaled back its involvement in the championship from full-time competition to supporting WRC2 entries. The company had previously supported its own eponymous team before becoming a supplier to and sponsor of M-Sport's third entry in 2017.

=== Crew changes ===
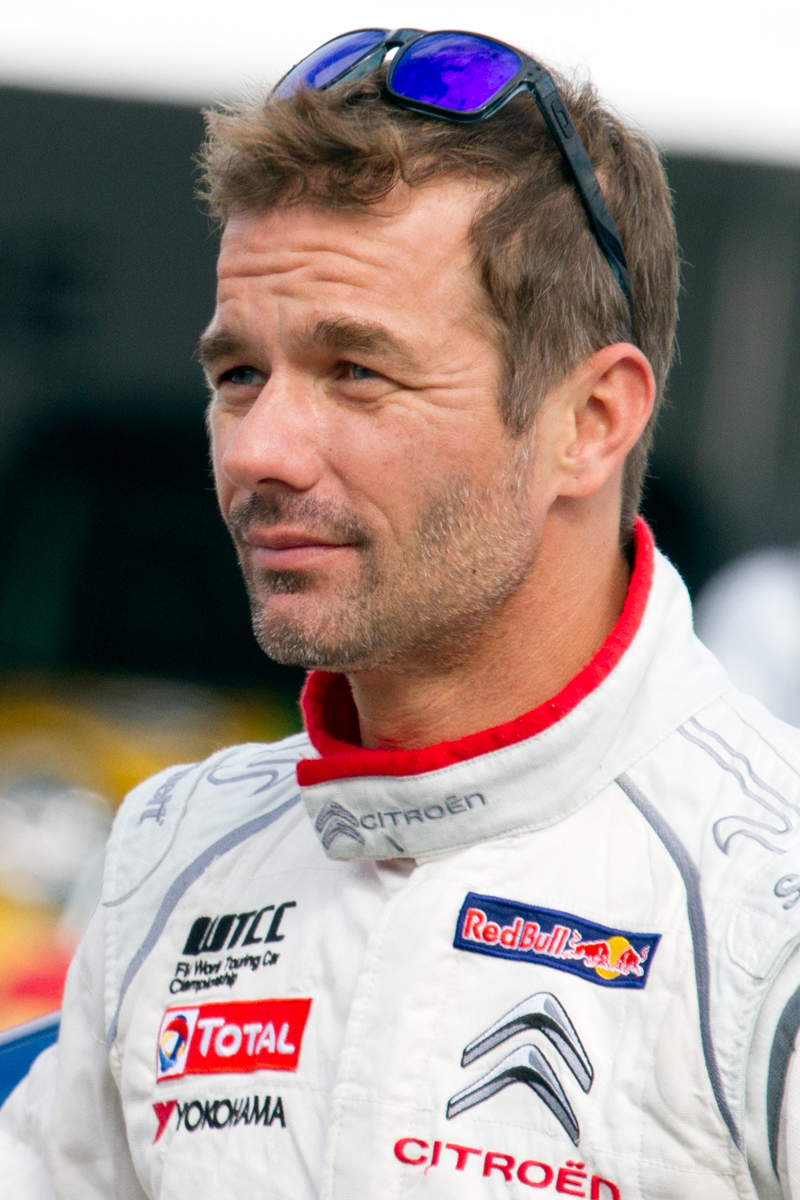
Nine-time World Champion Sébastien Loeb returned to the championship on a part-time basis with Citroën in 2018.

Nine-time World Champions Sébastien Loeb and Daniel Elena returned to the World Rally Championship with Citroën. They plan to contest selected rounds of the championship, allowing Loeb to compete in the Dakar Rally and the World Rallycross Championship. Loeb had previously been enlisted by the team to assist with development of the C3 WRC, particularly on loose surfaces, after Citroën endured a difficult championship campaign in 2017. With Citroën scaling back its commitment to two full-time entries, Stéphane Lefebvre left the championship to contest the WRC2 in an R5 variant of the C3 WRC. Mads Østberg left Jipocar World Rally Team and moved to Citroën, contesting selected events in the team's third entry. He retained ownership of the Ford Fiesta WRC that he competed with in 2017 through the Adapta World Rally Team, entering it separately to his own entry with Citroën. Kris Meeke and Paul Nagle were dismissed by Citroën after six rounds, with the team citing their disproportionately high number of crashes and a lack of self-control as the reason behind the sacking. Mads Østberg and Torstein Eriksen were recruited to replace Meeke and Nagle from the Rally Finland.

Andreas Mikkelsen and Anders Jæger returned to full-time competition with Hyundai World Rally Team. Mikkelsen and Jæger, who were left without a seat at the end of 2016 following Volkswagen Motorsport's withdrawal from the sport, contested selected rounds of the 2017 championship for Citroën and Hyundai before joining the team for 2018. Hyundai chose to split their third car between Hayden Paddon and Dani Sordo. The team entered four i20 Coupe WRCs in the Rally de Portugal to ensure that both Paddon and Sordo contest seven rounds of the championship each. Sordo also changed co-drivers, ending his four-year partnership with Marc Martí. He instead reunited with Carlos del Barrio, who previously drove with Sordo in 2013.

Ott Tänak and Martin Järveoja left M-Sport to join Toyota, where they replaced Juho Hänninen and Kaj Lindström. Hänninen and Lindström remained with the team, with Hänninen taking on a test driver role and Lindström joining the team's management. Following the departure of Tänak and Järveoja, M-Sport promoted Teemu Suninen and Mikko Markkula from their WRC2 team. Suninen and Markkula are sharing the car with Bryan Bouffier, who contested the Rallye Monte Carlo and the Tour de Corse. Bouffier was hired for his specialist knowledge of the events.

== Rule changes ==
The FIA took responsibility for the placement of artificial chicanes in stages, with regulations dictating their placement, width and frequency of use. The changes were introduced following the 2017 Rally Finland where event organisers placed chicanes that were criticised by drivers for being too narrow, poorly-positioned and potentially dangerous.

Privateers entering 2017-specification World Rally Cars are permitted to enter their cars under their own team names. In 2017, privateers competing in current-specification cars had to have their entries submitted by a manufacturer.

The WRC Trophy were no longer be open to privateers entering World Rally Cars older than 2017-specification models.

In the week before the Tour de Corse, the FIA approved a rule change that any crew checking in late to the Power Stage forfeits the possibility of scoring points in the stage. The changes were introduced in response to controversies that arose in the Rallies of Sweden and Mexico where crews deliberately checked in late to the Power Stage, incurring time penalties but earning more favourable conditions on the stage for the purposes of setting a faster time to secure more points.

== Season report ==
=== Rallye Automobile Monte Carlo ===
Rallye Monte Carlo saw Sébastien Ogier and Julien Ingrassia start their title defence with a rally victory, recording their fifth victory in the event. Ott Tänak and Martin Järveoja finished second on their Toyota debut, with teammates Jari-Matti Latvala and Miikka Anttila rounding out the podium. Citroën number one Kris Meeke claimed fourth with the fastest time on the Power Stage, despite spinning and reversing into a ditch on the opening stage during Thursday night. Hyundai star Thierry Neuville went off the road on the same stage as Meeke, eventually finishing fifth and taking four points from the power stage. Elfyn Evans and Daniel Barritt were sixth to give their team, M-Sport World Rally Team, an early lead in the manufacturers' championship. Esapekka Lappi made a mistake on the final stage, which cost him half a minute to get back on the road and dropped him from fourth to seventh. Bryan Bouffier, who drove Ford's third car, finished eighth. Craig Breen and Scott Martin were ninth on the board after enduring brake problems on Friday morning. WRC2 winner Jan Kopecky snatched one point with tenth place overall. Andreas Mikkelsen took three points in the power stage after retiring from Friday due to an alternator problem. Teammate Dani Sordo retired from the rally whilst running in third place when he went off the road in snowy conditions on Saturday morning.

=== Rally Sweden ===
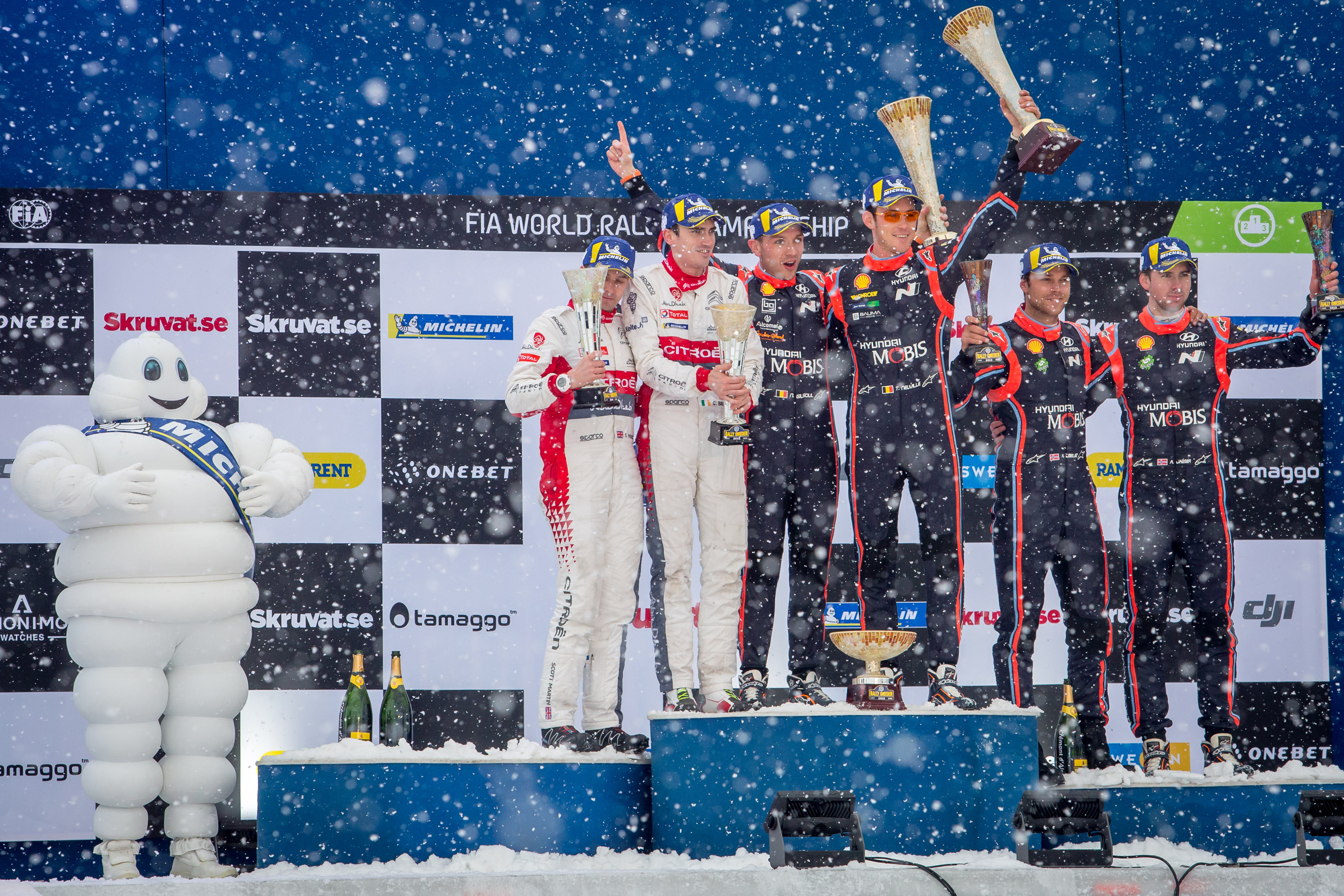
Top three crews celebrating on the podium.

Thierry Neuville won his seventh world rally and his first on snow to take the lead of the drivers' championship by ten points. The Belgian also became only the third non-Nordic driver to win the event after Sébastien Loeb and Sébastien Ogier. Craig Breen finished a career-high second after a consistent performance, with Andreas Mikkelsen rounding out the podium. With a one-three finish, Hyundai led the manufacturers' championship for the first time ever. Esapekka Lappi grabbed fourth from Hayden Paddon, and also took a full five points from the Power Stage to climbed up to fourth in the drivers' championship, on the same points as teammate Jari-Matti Latvala, who was one of many drivers to struggle in the deep snow and finished seventh overall. Norwegian Mads Østberg drove a Citroën C3 WRC especially for the event and finished sixth. Young Finn Teemu Suninen was eighth in a Ford Fiesta, the highest placed amongst the M-Sport drivers. Ott Tänak and Monte-Carlo winner Sébastien Ogier struggled the most with grip all weekend, as they ploughed a path through deep snow, being second and first on the road order. They were unable to regain lost ground and finished ninth and tenth respectively. Elfyn Evans struggled all weekend and finished outside the points in eleventh, whilst Kris Meeke retired with engine issues after hitting a snowbank during Saturday.

=== Rally Guanajuato México ===
Sébastien Ogier sealed his second victory of the season, despite receiving a 10-second penalty for cutting a chicane. With the victory, he recaptured the position of championship leader from Thierry Neuville, who finished sixth overall after faring worst in the conditions and losing more than 20 seconds due to a fuel pressure problem and a power steering issue on his i20 on Friday, by four points. Kris Meeke lost second place to Friday leader Dani Sordo after a half roll on Sunday morning. Andreas Mikkelsen finished fourth and snatched two points on the Power Stage, after struggling with his i20's handling throughout. Returning nine-time champion Sébastien Loeb was fifth overall and took an extra point at the Power Stage after suffered a puncture on Saturday whilst leading. WRC2 winner Pontus Tidemand finished seventh ahead of Jari-Matti Latvala, who fought back up the leaderboard after retiring his Toyota Yaris on Friday with alternator problems. WRC2 drivers Gus Greensmith and Pedro Heller completed the top ten. Ott Tänak finished fourteenth overall, but took victory and five points from the Power Stage. Elfyn Evans withdrew from the rally after co-driver Daniel Barritt suffered a concussion during a crash on Friday morning, whilst teammate Teemu Suninen and Toyota's Esapekka Lappi retired from Friday due to hitting a barrier and crashing out respectively.

=== Tour de Corse ===
Sébastien Ogier and Julien Ingrassia took their third win of the year in Corsica, ahead of Ott Tänak and Thierry Neuville, who suffered multiple issues during the weekend. Dani Sordo and Elfyn Evans finished fourth and fifth respectively, separated by just 3.5 seconds. Esapekka Lappi thrust himself into the fight for second on Saturday, but his hopes were shattered when he hit a kerb and was forced to stop and change a punctured tyre. He eventually plummeted to seventh, but salvaged maximum bonus points by winning the final power Stage in his Yaris, as well as overhauling Andreas Mikkelsen to climb to sixth. WRC2 winner Jan Kopecký finished eighth ahead of Kris Meeke, who restarted under Rally2 regulations after going off the road when co-driver Paul Nagle read the wrong pace notes. WRC2 runner Yoann Bonato completed the top ten. Nine-time world champion Sébastien Loeb finished out of the points after going off into a ditch on SS2 and having to restart under Rally2, but he would claim four points from the Power Stage.

=== Rally Argentina ===
Ott Tänak and Martin Järveoja took their first victory of the season and their first for their new employers: Toyota Gazoo Racing WRT. Thierry Neuville and teammate Dani Sordo finished second and third overall, which allowed their team, Hyundai Shell Mobis WRT, to move further ahead at the top of the manufacturers' championship. Championship leader Sébastien Ogier finished fourth, with his lead in the Drivers' championship shrinking to ten points. Andreas Mikkelsen was just four seconds behind in fifth, whilst Elfyn Evans finished sixth in another Fiesta. Kris Meeke came home seventh after picking up a puncture on Saturday whilst in contention for a podium. Esapekka Lappi, Teemu Suninen and WRC2 winner Pontus Tidemand completed the leaderboard. Jari-Matti Latvala was forced to retire from the rally after his Yaris' front right suspension and engine lubrication system sustained significant damage on Friday. Craig Breen was also forced to retire on Saturday after rolling his Citroën and damaging the rollcage.

=== Rally de Portugal ===
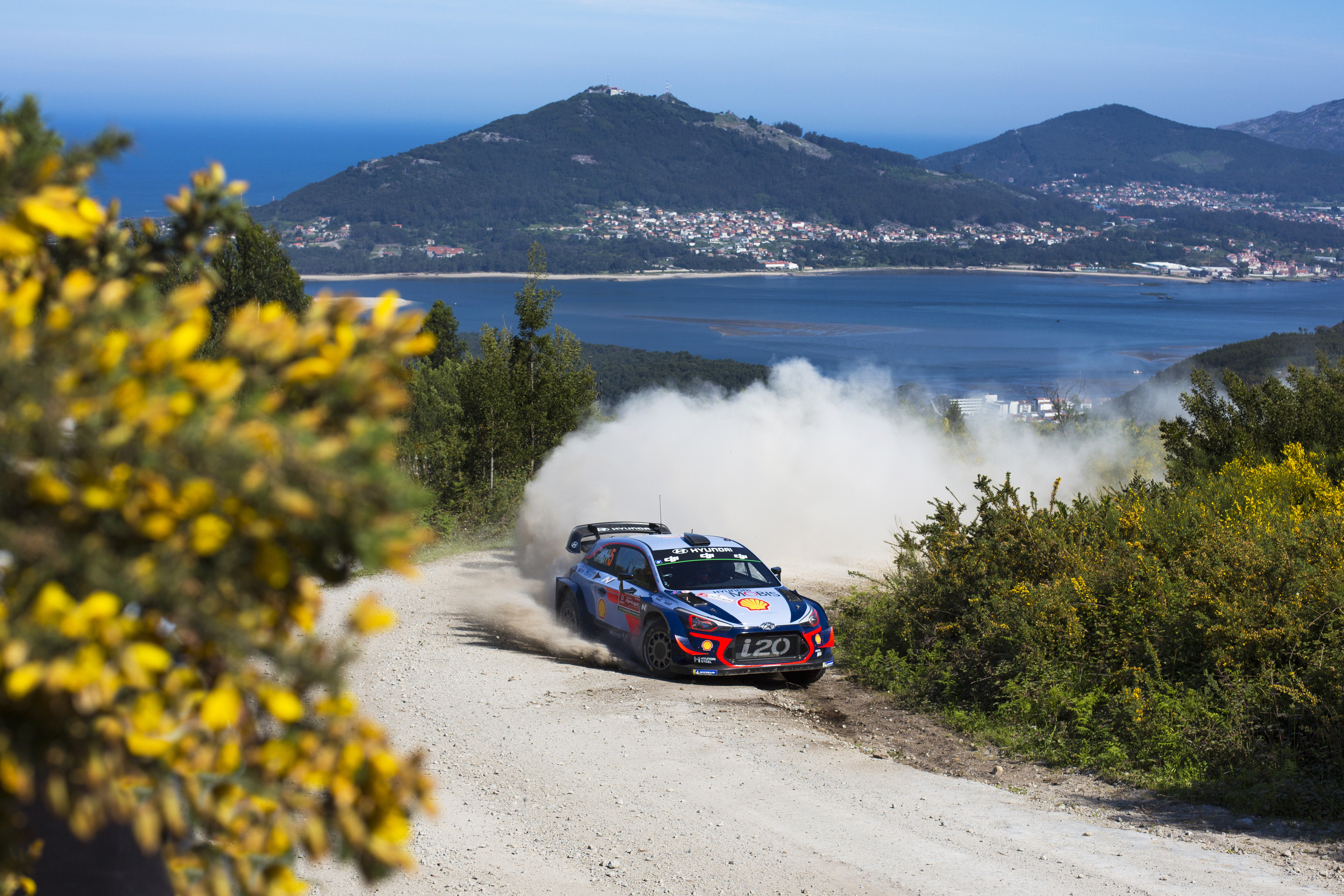
Thierry Neuville and Nicolas Gilsoul took their second win of 2018 in Portugal.

Thierry Neuville took his first Portugal and eighth WRC victory after a four-day battle. Because the championship leader Sébastien Ogier failed to score any points, he relinquished the championship lead to Neuville. The Belgian left with a nineteen-point lead. Ogier's Ford teammate's Elfyn Evans and Teemu Suninen both finished on the podium to help the team narrow the gap to Hyundai to thirteen points. Argentina winner Ott Tänak retired from the rally on the first gravel stage due to damaging his engine's cooling system after hitting a large rock, while Kris Meeke crashed his Citroën C3 during SS12 on Saturday. Esapekka Lappi took another Power Stage win but received a ten-second penalty for displacing dividing bales on SS9's third roundabout, which meant he lost his fourth place to Dani Sordo. Mads Østberg and teammate Craig Breen finished in sixth and seventh overall, which brought some valuable points to Citroën. WRC2 podium finishers Pontus Tidemand, Łukasz Pieniążek and Stéphane Lefebvre finished in eighth, ninth and tenth respectively to complete the leaderboard.

=== Rally Italia Sardegna ===
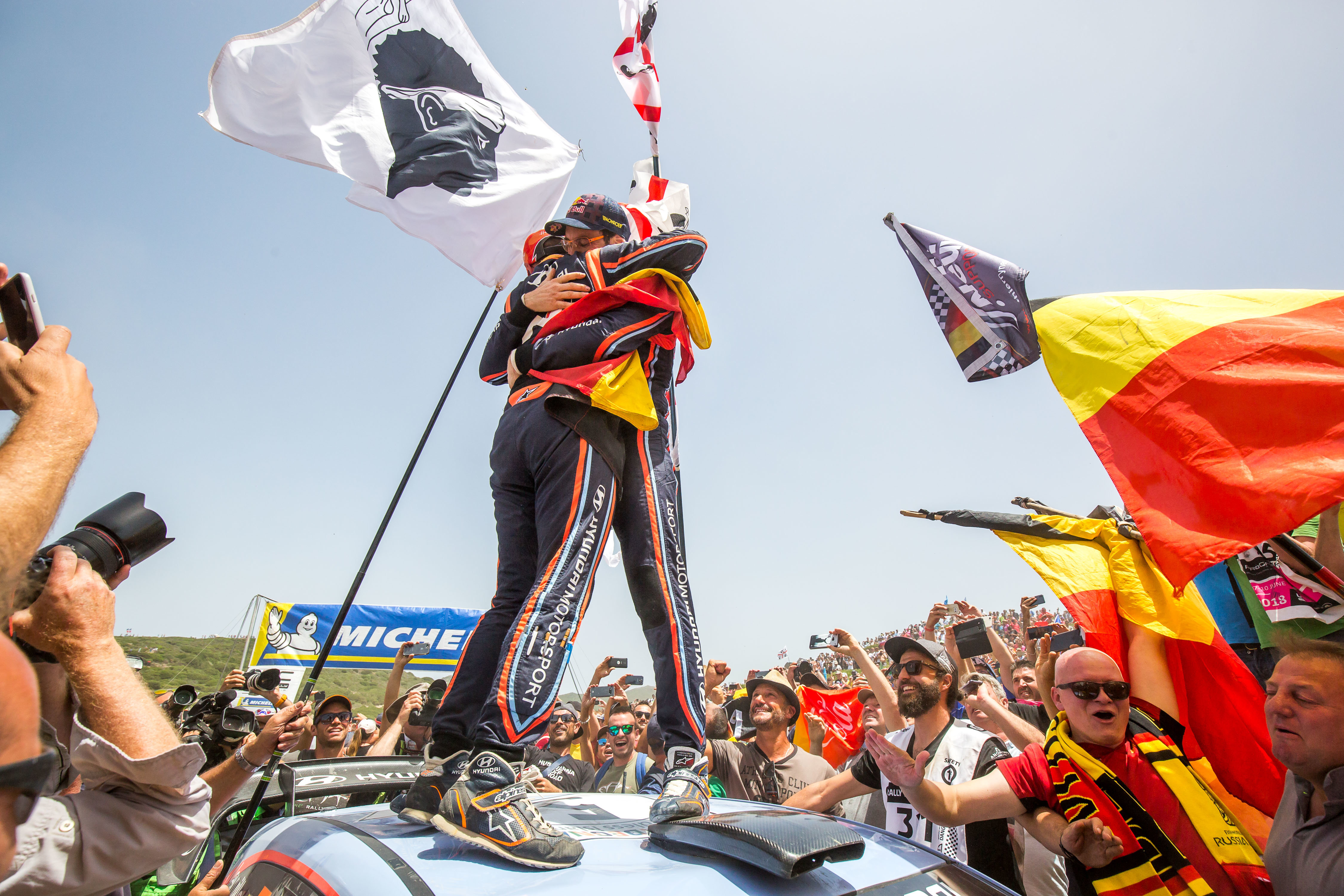
Winning crew Thierry Neuville and Nicolas Gilsoul celebrating after the Power Stage.

Thierry Neuville defeated the defending world champion Sébastien Ogier on the last stage. The Belgian won the Power Stage, gaining the maximum thirty points from the event and extending his championship lead to twenty-seven points. The difference between the two title rivals was 0.7 seconds, which at the time was tied with the 2017 Rally Argentina for the third-tightest winning margin in WRC history. Esapekka Lappi rounded out the podium places in a Yaris, followed by Hayden Paddon in fourth overall. With a one-four finish, Hyundai moved further ahead in the manufacturers' championship, twenty-eight points ahead of M-Sport World Rally Team. The two Citroën drivers Mads Østberg and Craig Breen finished fifth and sixth respectively, ahead of Jari-Matti Latvala, who was running under Rally2 regulations because of an alternator problem on Saturday. WRC2 category leader Jan Kopecký came home in eighth followed by Ott Tänak, who damaged his radiator on Friday and received a forty-second penalty, while Teemu Suninen, who went off the road on Friday, completed the top ten. Andreas Mikkelsen also retired from Friday due to a gearbox issue, but claimed two points from the Power Stage.

=== Rally Finland ===
Ott Tänak took his second rally victory of the season with a Power Stage win in Finland to gain a maximum thirty points. With a master-class performance in Rally Finland, he closed the gap to the front in the championship to twenty-five points. Mads Østberg edged Jari-Matti Latvala by only 2.8 seconds to finish second overall. Hayden Paddon completed the rally in fourth place after defending rally winner Esapekka Lappi went off in SS20. Sébastien Ogier finished fifth place after Ford gave team orders to Elfyn Evans, who finished in seventh overall, on Friday and Teemu Suninen, who finished sixth in another Fiesta, on Sunday respectively. Craig Breen in eighth after Friday's early puncture and late fuel pressure issue. Championship leader Thierry Neuville, who was first on the road on Friday, ended his rally ahead of his teammate Andreas Mikkelsen, who rolled his i20 on Friday, in ninth place. Despite an unsatisfying result, he still led the championship by twenty-one points over the defending world champion.

=== ADAC Rallye Deutschland ===
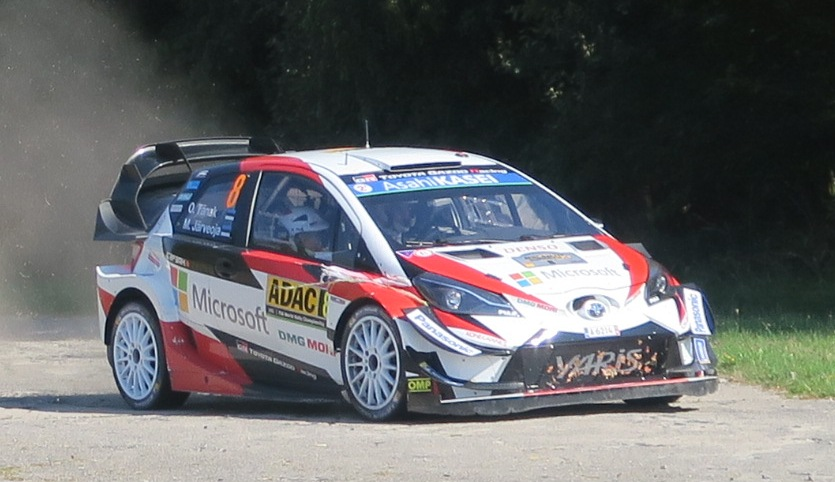
Eventual winners Ott Tänak and Martin Järveoja during the rally in Germany

Ott Tänak achieved back-to-back victories for the first time in his career and claimed his second consecutive win in Germany, to rekindle both his and Toyota's championship hopes. During the first half of the rally his main challenger was Sébastien Ogier, but that ended when the Frenchman clipped a boulder on the second run through Panzerplatte and was forced to stop and change a damaged wheel, plummeting to eighth in the process. Going into the final day the battle for second place was now between Dani Sordo and Jari-Matti Latvala, but both drivers would drop out of the rally on stage 16; Sordo when a trip through the vineyards damaged his radiator, and Latvala when his transmission failed. All of this benefitted Thierry Neuville and Esapekka Lappi, who eventually finished second and third respectively, allowing the former to extend his championship lead to 23 points. Ogier claimed fourth after a final day charge up the leaderboard which culminated with a victory in the powerstage, followed by Teemu Suninen, Andreas Mikkelsen and Craig Breen. Eighth place went to local driver Marijan Griebel, with leading WRC2 drivers Jan Kopecky and seventeen-year-old Kalle Rovanperä completing the points finishers.

=== Marmaris Rally of Turkey ===
The WRC's return to Turkey saw Ott Tänak score his third consecutive victory, and in doing so moved him to second in the standings behind Thierry Neuville. Tänak's teammate Jari-Matti Latvala finished in a season-high second place to also put Toyota Gazoo Racing WRT into the lead of the manufacturers championship, and Hyundai's Hayden Paddon completed the podium. Teemu Suninen took fourth ahead of Andreas Mikkelsen, who had led until his transmission failed. The rally would see many casualties as a result of the very rough stages. Championship leader Neuville had been leading at the end of leg one, but was forced to retire when his suspension failed on Saturday morning. This handed championship rival Sébastien Ogier the rally lead, and although he managed to repair a broken steering arm after stage 9, he too would go out when he went off the road two stages later. Both drivers recovered to set first and second place times respectively on the power stage. Other casualties included Elfyn Evans who broke his suspension on stage 6, Esapekka Lappi who went off on stage 10, Mads Østberg who suffered both suspension and turbo failure, and early leader Craig Breen whose car caught fire and burned out. The top 10 was completed by WRC2 runners Henning Solberg, Jan Kopecky, Simone Tempestini, Chris Ingram and the recovering Ogier.

=== Wales Rally GB ===
This weekend turned out to be disastrous for Ott Tänak and Martin Järveoja. The Estonian crew led the rally with a comfortable lead until they damaged the radiator after a landing off a jump during the second pass through Sweet Lamb Hafren. This left former teammate Sébastien Ogier and Jari-Matti Latvala batting for the victory. Eventually, defending world champion snatched the victory from the Finn by 10.6 seconds to move back on second in the drivers' championship, just seven points behind championship leader Thierry Neuville, who recovered to fifth after he went off on Saturday. Esapekka Lappi gained another podium to extend Toyota's lead over Hyundai to twenty points. Craig Breen finished the rally in fourth place after enjoying a trouble-free weekend except a spin on Sunday. Mads Østberg lost two places to Andreas Mikkelsen and Hayden Paddon in eighth, followed by eighteen year-old WRC2 driver Kalle Rovanperä. Teammate Pontus Tidemand completed the event in tenth to cover out of the leaderboard.

=== RACC Rally Catalunya de España ===
Coming to Spain, nine-time world champion Sébastien Loeb returned to enter the rally with a Citroën C3. His experience on tarmac roads successfully helped him achieve his 79th career win. Loeb's victory also marked the longest time span in history between a driver's first and last event win. Defending world champion Sébastien Ogier finished second with four extra Power Stage points, which elevated him to the championship lead by three points heading to Australia. His teammate Elfyn Evans found his pace and successfully kept Thierry Neuville, who suffered a puncture in the last few kilometers of the event, and Dani Sordo behind. Three more punctured tyres — one for Ott Tänak, who was leading the rally on Saturday; the other two for Jari-Matti Latvala, who was fighting for his first rally victory of the season — completely ruined their incredible speed and also shrunk Tänak's title chances. The Estonian eventually finished the rally sixth, ahead of his Toyota teammates Lappi and Latvala. Despite winning the Power Stage, Tänak fell twenty-three points off the championship leader. In the Manufacturers' championship, Toyota's lead over Hyundai decreased to twelve points.

=== Rally Australia ===
Before going to Coffs Harbour, Sébastien Ogier, who was the defending world champion, Thierry Neuville, who led the championship for most of the year, and Ott Tänak, who got the most stage victories of the season, were in contention of the drivers' title. However, Neuville clipped a bank and a tree forced to retire, while Tänak also stopped because of the damage to transmission. This meant Ogier would become the six-time world champion wherever he finishes. At the conclusion of the rally, Ogier finished fifth with a Power Stage victory.

The event eventually went into Jari-Matti Latvala's pocket. Teammate Esapekka Lappi completed the rally in fourth. The 1 & 4 finish was enough to help Toyota Gazoo Racing WRT win their first manufacturers' title since 1999. With Tommi Mäkinen heading the team, he became the first person in the history of rally driving to win a Championship both as a driver and as a team principal.

Hayden Paddon and Mads Østberg rounded out of the podium. Elfyn Evans completed the event in sixth after teammate Ogier, while Craig Breen gained one place from Teemu Suninen, who retired his Fiesta before the final test following an impact in the previous stage. WRC2 category winner Alberto Heller, local driver Steve Glenney and rally veteran Jourdan Serderidis covered out of the top ten finishers.

== Results and standings ==
=== Season summary ===
Round	Event	Winning driver	Winning co-driver	Winning entrant	Winning time	Report
1	(Monaco) Rallye Automobile Monte Carlo	(France) Sébastien Ogier	(France) Julien Ingrassia	(United Kingdom) M-Sport Ford WRT	4:18:55.5	Report
2	Rally Sweden	(Belgium) Thierry Neuville	(Belgium) Nicolas Gilsoul	(South Korea) Hyundai Shell Mobis WRT	2:52:13.1	Report
3	(Mexico) Rally Guanajuato México	(France) Sébastien Ogier	(France) Julien Ingrassia	(United Kingdom) M-Sport Ford WRT	3:54:08.0	Report
4	(France) Tour de Corse	(France) Sébastien Ogier	(France) Julien Ingrassia	(United Kingdom) M-Sport Ford WRT	3:26:52.7	Report
5	Rally Argentina	(Estonia) Ott Tänak	(Estonia) Martin Järveoja	(Japan) Toyota Gazoo Racing WRT	3:43:28.9	Report
6	Rally de Portugal	(Belgium) Thierry Neuville	(Belgium) Nicolas Gilsoul	(South Korea) Hyundai Shell Mobis WRT	3:49:46.6	Report
7	(Italy) Rally Italia Sardegna	(Belgium) Thierry Neuville	(Belgium) Nicolas Gilsoul	(South Korea) Hyundai Shell Mobis WRT	3:29:18.7	Report
8	Rally Finland	(Estonia) Ott Tänak	(Estonia) Martin Järveoja	(Japan) Toyota Gazoo Racing WRT	2:35:18.1	Report
9	(Germany) ADAC Rallye Deutschland	(Estonia) Ott Tänak	(Estonia) Martin Järveoja	(Japan) Toyota Gazoo Racing WRT	3:03:36.9	Report
10	Marmaris Rally of Turkey	(Estonia) Ott Tänak	(Estonia) Martin Järveoja	(Japan) Toyota Gazoo Racing WRT	3:59:24.5	Report
11	(United Kingdom) Wales Rally GB	(France) Sébastien Ogier	(France) Julien Ingrassia	(United Kingdom) M-Sport Ford WRT	3:06:12.5	Report
12	(Spain) RACC Rally Catalunya de España	(France) Sébastien Loeb	(Monaco) Daniel Elena	(France) Citroën Total Abu Dhabi WRT	3:12:08.0	Report
13	Rally Australia	(Finland) Jari-Matti Latvala	(Finland) Miikka Anttila	(Japan) Toyota Gazoo Racing WRT	2:59:52.0	Report

=== Scoring system ===
Points were awarded to the top ten classified finishers in each event. In the manufacturers' championship, teams were eligible to nominate three crews to score points, but these points were only awarded to the top two classified finishers representing a manufacturer and driving a 2017-specification World Rally Car. There were also five bonus points awarded to the winners of the Power Stage, four points for second place, three for third, two for fourth and one for fifth. Power Stage points were only awarded in the drivers' and co-drivers' championships.

Position	1st	2nd	3rd	4th	5th	6th	7th	8th	9th	10th
Points	25	18	15	12	10	8	6	4	2	1

=== FIA World Rally Championship for Drivers ===
Pos.	Driver	MON (Monaco)	SWE (Sweden)	MEX (Mexico)	FRA (France)	ARG (Argentina)	POR (Portugal)	ITA (Italy)	FIN (Finland)	DEU (Germany)	TUR (Turkey)	GBR (United Kingdom)	CAT (Spain)	AUS (Australia)	Points
1	(France) Sébastien Ogier	1^{5}	10^{2}	1	1^{3}	4^{2}	Ret	2^{2}	5	4^{1}	10^{2}	1^{3}	2^{2}	5^{1}	219
2	(Belgium) Thierry Neuville	5^{2}	1^{4}	6^{3}	3	2^{1}	1^{2}	1^{1}	9^{4}	2^{5}	16^{1}	5^{4}	4	Ret	201
3	(Estonia) Ott Tänak	2	9^{5}	14^{1}	2^{5}	1^{4}	Ret	9^{3}	1^{1}	1^{2}	1^{3}	19^{2}	6^{1}	Ret	181
4	(Finland) Jari-Matti Latvala	3^{4}	7	8^{2}	Ret	Ret	24	7	3^{3}	Ret	2^{4}	2^{1}	8	1^{5}	128
5	(Finland) Esapekka Lappi	7	4^{1}	11	6^{1}	8	5^{1}	3	Ret	3^{3}	Ret	3^{5}	7	4^{2}	126
6	(Norway) Andreas Mikkelsen	13^{3}	3^{3}	4^{4}	7	5^{3}	16	18^{4}	10	6	5	6	10	11	84
7	(United Kingdom) Elfyn Evans	6	14	Ret	5	6	2^{5}	14^{5}	7	25	12^{5}	20	3^{4}	6^{4}	80
8	(New Zealand) Hayden Paddon		5				Ret	4	4		3	7		2	73
9	(Spain) Dani Sordo	Ret		2	4	3	4^{3}			Ret			5^{5}		71
10	(Norway) Mads Østberg		6				6	5	2^{2}	Ret	23	8		3^{3}	70
11	(Republic of Ireland) Craig Breen	9	2			Ret	7	6	8^{5}	7^{4}	Ret	4	9	7	67
12	(Finland) Teemu Suninen	18	8	12		9	3^{4}	10	6	5	4	Ret	11	Ret	54
13	(France) Sébastien Loeb			5^{5}	14^{2}								1^{3}		43
14	(United Kingdom) Kris Meeke	4^{1}	Ret	3	9^{4}	7^{5}	Ret	WD							43
15	(Czech Republic) Jan Kopecký	10			8			8		9	7		13		17
16	(Sweden) Pontus Tidemand		12	7		10	8				Ret	10			12
17	(Norway) Henning Solberg		19								6		17		8
18	(Romania) Simone Tempestini						36	Ret	36	20	8	15	22		4
19	(France) Bryan Bouffier	8			Ret										4
20	(Chile) Alberto Heller					Ret								8	4
21	(Germany) Marijan Griebel									8					4
22	(Finland) Kalle Rovanperä	11		15		Ret			14	10		9	12		3
23	(United Kingdom) Gus Greensmith	Ret		9	13	12	18		13	Ret	Ret	11			2
24	(Poland) Łukasz Pieniążek		38		15		9	16	Ret	14		14	31		2
25	(United Kingdom) Chris Ingram										9	34			2
26	(Australia) Steve Glenney													9	2
27	(Chile) Pedro Heller			10		15	20				13			Ret	1
28	(France) Yoann Bonato	15			10					26					1
29	(France) Stéphane Lefebvre				Ret		10	24	44	16		13	32		1
30	(Greece) Jourdan Serderidis									18				10	1
Pos.	Driver	MON (Monaco)	SWE (Sweden)	MEX (Mexico)	FRA (France)	ARG (Argentina)	POR (Portugal)	ITA (Italy)	FIN (Finland)	DEU (Germany)	TUR (Turkey)	GBR (United Kingdom)	CAT (Spain)	AUS (Australia)	Points

Key
Colour	Result
Gold	Winner
Silver	2nd place
Bronze	3rd place
Green	Points finish
Blue	Non-points finish
Blue	Non-classified finish (NC)
Purple	Did not finish (Ret)
Black	Excluded (EX)
Black	Disqualified (DSQ)
White	Did not start (DNS)
White	Cancelled (C)
Blank	Withdrew entry from the event (WD)

Notes:
^{1 2 3 4 5} – Power Stage position

=== FIA World Rally Championship for Co-Drivers ===
Pos.	Co-Driver	MON (Monaco)	SWE (Sweden)	MEX (Mexico)	FRA (France)	ARG (Argentina)	POR (Portugal)	ITA (Italy)	FIN (Finland)	DEU (Germany)	TUR (Turkey)	GBR (United Kingdom)	CAT (Spain)	AUS (Australia)	Points
1	(France) Julien Ingrassia	1^{5}	10^{2}	1	1^{3}	4^{2}	Ret	2^{2}	5	4^{1}	10^{2}	1^{3}	2^{2}	5^{1}	219
2	(Belgium) Nicolas Gilsoul	5^{2}	1^{4}	6^{3}	3	2^{1}	1^{2}	1^{1}	9^{4}	2^{5}	16^{1}	5^{4}	4	Ret	201
3	(Estonia) Martin Järveoja	2	9^{5}	14^{1}	2^{5}	1^{4}	Ret	9^{3}	1^{1}	1^{2}	1^{3}	19^{2}	6^{1}	Ret	181
4	(Finland) Miikka Anttila	3^{4}	7	8^{2}	Ret	Ret	24	7	3^{3}	Ret	2^{4}	2^{1}	8	1^{5}	128
5	(Finland) Janne Ferm	7	4^{1}	11	6^{1}	8	5^{1}	3	Ret	3^{3}	Ret	3^{5}	7	4^{2}	126
6	(Norway) Anders Jæger-Synnevaag	13^{3}	3^{3}	4^{4}	7	5^{3}	16	18^{4}	10	6	5	6	10	11	84
7	(United Kingdom) Sebastian Marshall		5				Ret	4	4		3	7		2	73
8	(Spain) Carlos del Barrio	Ret		2	4	3	4^{3}			Ret			5^{5}		71
9	(Norway) Torstein Eriksen		6				6	5	2^{2}	Ret	23	8		3^{3}	70
10	(United Kingdom) Daniel Barritt	6	14	Ret		6	2^{5}	14^{5}	7	25	12^{5}	20	3^{4}	6^{4}	70
11	(United Kingdom) Scott Martin	9	2			Ret	7	6	8^{5}	7^{4}	Ret	4	9	7	67
12	(Finland) Mikko Markkula	18	8	12		9	3^{4}	10	6	5	4	Ret	11	Ret	54
13	(Monaco) Daniel Elena			5^{5}	14^{2}								1^{3}		43
14	(Republic of Ireland) Paul Nagle	4^{1}	Ret	3	9^{4}	7^{5}	Ret	WD							43
15	(Czech Republic) Pavel Dresler	10			8			8		9	7		13		17
16	(Sweden) Jonas Andersson		12	7		10	8				Ret	10			12
17	(United Kingdom) Phil Mills				5										10
18	(Austria) Ilka Minor										6		17		8
19	(Romania) Sergiu Itu						36	Ret	36	20	8	15	22		4
20	(France) Xavier Panseri	8			Ret										4
21	(Argentina) José Diaz					Ret								8	4
22	(Germany) Alexander Rath									8					4
23	(Finland) Jonne Halttunen	11		15		Ret			14	10		9	12		3
24	(United Kingdom) Craig Parry	Ret		9	13	12	18		13						2
25	(Poland) Przemysław Mazur		38		15		9	16	Ret	14		14	31		2
26	(United Kingdom) Ross Whittock										9	34			2
27	(Australia) Andrew Sarandis													9	2
28	(Argentina) Pablo Olmos			10		15	20				13			Ret	1
29	(France) Benjamin Boulloud	15			10					26					1
30	(France) Gabin Moreau				Ret		10	24	44	16		13	30		1
31	(Belgium) Lara Vanneste													10	1
Pos.	Co-Driver	MON (Monaco)	SWE (Sweden)	MEX (Mexico)	FRA (France)	ARG (Argentina)	POR (Portugal)	ITA (Italy)	FIN (Finland)	DEU (Germany)	TUR (Turkey)	GBR (United Kingdom)	CAT (Spain)	AUS (Australia)	Points

Key
Colour	Result
Gold	Winner
Silver	2nd place
Bronze	3rd place
Green	Points finish
Blue	Non-points finish
Blue	Non-classified finish (NC)
Purple	Did not finish (Ret)
Black	Excluded (EX)
Black	Disqualified (DSQ)
White	Did not start (DNS)
White	Cancelled (C)
Blank	Withdrew entry from the event (WD)

Notes:
^{1 2 3 4 5} – Power Stage position

=== FIA World Rally Championship for Manufacturers ===
Pos.	Manufacturer	No.	MON (Monaco)	SWE (Sweden)	MEX (Mexico)	FRA (France)	ARG (Argentina)	POR (Portugal)	ITA (Italy)	FIN (Finland)	DEU (Germany)	TUR (Turkey)	GBR (United Kingdom)	CAT (Spain)	AUS (Australia)	Points
1	(Japan) Toyota Gazoo Racing WRT	7	3	6	6	Ret	Ret	8	7	3	Ret	2	2	NC	1	368
1	(Japan) Toyota Gazoo Racing WRT	8	2	NC	NC	2	1	Ret	NC	1	1	1	NC	6	Ret	368
1	(Japan) Toyota Gazoo Racing WRT	9	NC	4	7	6	7	4	3	Ret	3	Ret	3	7	4	368
2	(South Korea) Hyundai Shell Mobis WRT	4	8	3	4	NC	NC	7	NC	NC	6	5	6	NC	8	341
2	(South Korea) Hyundai Shell Mobis WRT	5	5	1	NC	3	2	1	1	8	2	NC	5	4	Ret	341
2	(South Korea) Hyundai Shell Mobis WRT	6	Ret	NC	2	4	3	Ret	4	4	Ret	3	NC	5	2	341
3	(United Kingdom) M-Sport Ford WRT	1	1	8	1	1	4	Ret	2	5	4	6	1	2	5	324
3	(United Kingdom) M-Sport Ford WRT	2	6	NC	Ret	5	5	2	NC	NC	NC	NC	8	3	6	324
3	(United Kingdom) M-Sport Ford WRT	3	NC	7	8	Ret	NC	3	8	6	5	4	Ret	NC	Ret	324
4	(France) Citroën Total Abu Dhabi WRT	10	4	Ret	3	7	6	Ret	WD	2	Ret	8	7	1	3	237
4	(France) Citroën Total Abu Dhabi WRT	11	7	2	5	8	Ret	6	6	7	7	Ret	4	8	7	237
4	(France) Citroën Total Abu Dhabi WRT	12		5			8	5	5	NC		7		NC		237
Pos.	Manufacturer	No.	MON (Monaco)	SWE (Sweden)	MEX (Mexico)	FRA (France)	ARG (Argentina)	POR (Portugal)	ITA (Italy)	FIN (Finland)	DEU (Germany)	TUR (Turkey)	GBR (United Kingdom)	CAT (Spain)	AUS (Australia)	Points

Key
Colour	Result
Gold	Winner
Silver	2nd place
Bronze	3rd place
Green	Points finish
Blue	Non-points finish
Blue	Non-classified finish (NC)
Purple	Did not finish (Ret)
Black	Excluded (EX)
Black	Disqualified (DSQ)
White	Did not start (DNS)
White	Cancelled (C)
Blank	Withdrew entry from the event (WD)
