= 2025 WRC2 Championship =

Motorsport competition

The 2025 FIA WRC2 Championship was the thirteenth season of WRC2, a rallying championship for organised and governed by the Fédération Internationale de l'Automobile as the second-highest tier of international rallying. It is open to privateers and teams using cars complying with Group Rally2 regulations. The championship began in January 2025 with the Monte Carlo Rally and would conclude in November 2025 with the Rally Saudi Arabia, and runs in support of the 2025 World Rally Championship.

Sami Pajari and Enni Mälkönen were the defending drivers' and co-drivers' champions. However, Pajari did not defend his title as he was promoted to the top tier by Toyota Gazoo Racing WRT. Oliver Solberg and Elliott Edmondson became the 2025 WRC2 champions.

== Calendar ==
The 2025 season was contested over fourteen rounds across Europe, Africa, South America and Asia.

Round	Start date	Finish date	Rally	Rally headquarters	Surface	Stages	Distance	Ref.
1	23 January	26 January	(Monaco) Rallye Automobile Monte Carlo	Gap, Provence-Alpes-Côte d'Azur, France	Mixed (Note: The Monte Carlo Rally is run on a tarmac and snow surface.)	18	343.80 km	
2	13 February	16 February	Rally Sweden	Umeå, Västerbotten County, Sweden	Snow	18	300.22 km	
3	20 March	23 March	Safari Rally Kenya	Nairobi, Nairobi County, Kenya	Gravel	21	383.10 km	
4	24 April	27 April	(Spain) Rally Islas Canarias	Las Palmas, Gran Canaria, Spain	Tarmac	18	301.30 km	
5	15 May	18 May	Rally de Portugal	Matosinhos, Porto, Portugal	Gravel	24	344.50 km	
6	5 June	8 June	(Italy) Rally Italia Sardegna	Olbia, Sardinia, Italy	Gravel	16	320.24 km	
7	26 June	29 June	Acropolis Rally Greece	Lamia, Central Greece, Greece	Gravel	17	345.76 km	
8	17 July	20 July	Rally Estonia	Tartu, Tartu County, Estonia	Gravel	20	308.35 km	
9	31 July	3 August	Rally Finland	Jyväskylä, Central Finland, Finland	Gravel	20	307.22 km	
10	28 August	31 August	Rally del Paraguay	Encarnación, Itapúa, Paraguay	Gravel	19	333.18 km	
11	11 September	14 September	Rally Chile	Concepción, Biobío, Chile	Gravel	16	306.76 km	
12	16 October	19 October	(Europe) Central European Rally	Bad Griesbach, Bavaria, Germany	Tarmac	18	306.08 km	
13	6 November	9 November	Rally Japan	Toyota, Aichi, Japan	Tarmac	20	305.34 km	
14	26 November	29 November	Rally Saudi Arabia	Jeddah, Mecca Province, Saudi Arabia	Gravel	17	319.44 km	

A map showing the locations of the rallies in the 2025 championship. Event headquarters are marked with black dots.

=== Calendar changes ===
The calendar was expanded to fourteen rounds, including five flyaway events. This was originally planned for the 2024 season, but WRC Promoter GmbH retained the total of thirteen events in the hopes of attracting more Rally1 entries.

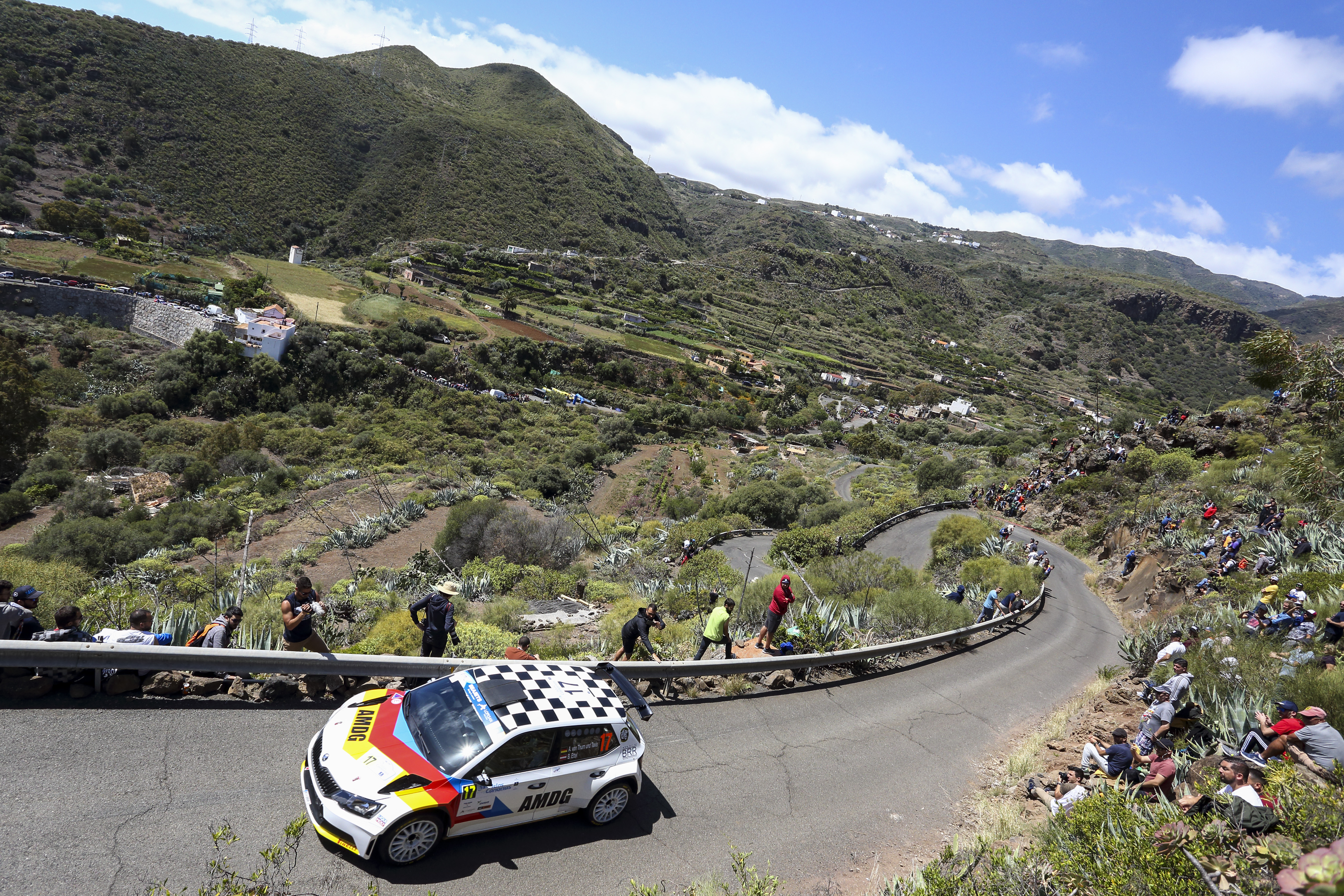
Rally Islas Canarias joined the WRC calendar.

- Rally Estonia returned to the championship after missing the 2024 season. The event replaced Rally Latvia on the calendar.
- Rally Islas Canarias was promoted from the European Rally Championship and became a World Championship event under a two-year deal. The event ran on tarmac roads.
- Rally Saudi Arabia joined the championship calendar after signing a ten-year contract with WRC Promoter GmbH. The rally was based in Jeddah, and was the season finale.
- Rally del Paraguay became a WRC event from 2025 after signing a multi-year deal, making Paraguay the thirty-eighth nation to host a WRC championship round.
- The Croatia Rally was not featured on the calendar for the first time since the event joined the championship in 2021. However, the event is set to return in 2026.
- Rally Poland was also removed from the calendar after making a one-year return to the championship in 2024.

== Contracted crews ==
The following teams and crews are under contract to contest the WRC2 championship in 2025. Teams must enter two crews to be eligible for Teams' Championship points.

Crews entered by or via teams
Entrant	Car	Driver		Co-Driver		Rounds
Entrant	Car	Driver Name	Category	Co-Driver Name	Category	Rounds
(Germany) Armin Schwarz Driving Experience	Toyota GR Yaris Rally2	(Germany) Fabio Schwarz	Challenger	(Italy) Bernhard Ettel	Challenger	7–8
FIA Rally Star	Ford Fiesta Rally2	(Estonia) Romet Jürgenson	Challenger	(Estonia) Siim Oja	Challenger	2, 4–6, 8–9
(Turkey) GP Garage My Team	Škoda Fabia RS Rally2	(Turkey) Uğur Soylu	Challenger	(Turkey) Sener Güray	Challenger	2, 4–7, 9
(Finland) JML-WRT Oy	Toyota GR Yaris Rally2	(Finland) Jari-Matti Latvala		(Finland) Janni Hussi		9
(United Kingdom) M-Sport World Rally Team	Ford Fiesta Rally2	(France) Pierre-Louis Loubet		(France) Loris Pascaud		5–6
(Italy) MT Racing SRL	Škoda Fabia RS Rally2	(Italy) Giovanni Trentin	Challenger	(Italy) Alessandro Franco	Challenger	4–7, 9
(Spain) Ph.ph	Toyota GR Yaris Rally2	(Spain) Jan Solans		(Spain) Rodrigo Sanjuan de Eusebio		3, 5–7
(France) PH Sport	Citroën C3 Rally2	(France) Léo Rossel	Challenger	(France) Guillaume Mercoiret	Challenger	1, 4–7, 9
(France) PH Sport	Citroën C3 Rally2	(France) Yohan Rossel		(France) Arnaud Dunand		1, 4–7, 10
(Finland) Printsport	Toyota GR Yaris Rally2	(Sweden) Oliver Solberg		(United Kingdom) Elliott Edmondson		2–3, 5, 7, 9–10
(Finland) Printsport	Toyota GR Yaris Rally2	(Poland) Michał Sołowow	Challenger	(Poland) Maciej Baran	Challenger	2
(Finland) Printsport	Toyota GR Yaris Rally2	(Saudi Arabia) Rakan Al-Rashed	Challenger	(Portugal) Hugo Magalhães	Challenger	5
(Finland) Rautio Motorsport	Toyota GR Yaris Rally2	(Finland) Roope Korhonen	Challenger	(Finland) Anssi Viinikka	Challenger	2, 5–6, 8–9
(Finland) Rautio Motorsport	Toyota GR Yaris Rally2	(Finland) Tuukka Kauppinen	Challenger	(Finland) Sebastian Virtanen	Challenger	2, 8–9
(France) Sarrazin Motorsport – Iron Lynx	Citroën C3 Rally2	(France) Sarah Rumeau	Challenger	(France) Julie Amblard	Challenger	1, 5–7, 9
(France) Sarrazin Motorsport – Iron Lynx	Citroën C3 Rally2	(France) Pablo Sarrazin	Challenger	(France) Geoffrey Combe	Challenger	1, 5–7, 9
(Germany) Toksport WRT	Škoda Fabia RS Rally2	(Paraguay) Fabrizio Zaldivar	Challenger	(Italy) Marcelo Der Ohannesian	Challenger	2–3, 5–8
(Germany) Toksport WRT	Škoda Fabia RS Rally2	(Finland) Emil Lindholm		(Finland) Reeta Hämäläinen		4, 6–7, 9
(Germany) Toksport WRT	Škoda Fabia RS Rally2	(Bulgaria) Nikolay Gryazin	Challenger	(Kyrgyzstan) Konstantin Aleksandrov	Challenger	4, 8, 10
(Germany) Toksport WRT	Škoda Fabia RS Rally2	(Estonia) Robert Virves	Challenger	(Estonia) Jakko Viilo	Challenger	5–10
(Spain) Toyota España	Toyota GR Yaris Rally2	(Spain) Alejandro Cachón	Challenger	(Spain) Borja Rozada	Challenger	4–7
(Japan) Toyota Gazoo Racing NG	Toyota GR Yaris Rally2	(Japan) Hikaru Kogure	Challenger	(Finland) Topi Luhtinen	Challenger	2, 4–5, 7
(Japan) Toyota Gazoo Racing NG	Toyota GR Yaris Rally2	(Japan) Yuki Yamamoto	Challenger	(Republic of Ireland) James Fulton	Challenger	2, 4–5, 7
(Japan) Toyota Gazoo Racing NG	Toyota GR Yaris Rally2	(Japan) Yuki Yamamoto	Challenger	(Finland) Topi Luhtinen	Challenger	8–9

Private entries
Car	Driver		Co-driver		Rounds
Car	Driver name	Category	Co-driver name	Category	Rounds
Citroën C3 Rally2	(Italy) Rachele Somaschini	Challenger	(Italy) Nicola Arena	Challenger	1–2, 4–6
Citroën C3 Rally2	(Czech Republic) Jan Černý	Challenger	(Czech Republic) Ondřej Krajča	Challenger	1
Citroën C3 Rally2	(Czech Republic) Jan Černý	Challenger	(Czech Republic) Jan Hloušek	Challenger	4, 9
Citroën C3 Rally2	(Spain) Diego Ruiloba	Challenger	(Spain) Ángel Vela	Challenger	4–8
Citroën C3 Rally2	(Spain) Yeray Lemes	Challenger	(Spain) Aitor Cambeiro	Challenger	~~4~~
Citroën C3 Rally2	(Spain) Efrén Llarena	Challenger	(Spain) Sara Fernández	Challenger	4
Citroën C3 Rally2	(Italy) Filippo Marchino	Challenger	(Italy) Pietro Elia Ometto	Challenger	4
Citroën C3 Rally2	(Spain) Luis Monzón	Challenger	(Spain) José Carlos Déniz	Challenger	4
Citroën C3 Rally2	(Belgium) Maxime Potty	Challenger	(Belgium) Renaud Herman	Challenger	~~4~~
Citroën C3 Rally2	(Spain) Juan Carlos Quintana	Challenger	(Spain) Jonathan Hernández	Challenger	4
Citroën C3 Rally2	(Romania) Eugen Cărăgui	Challenger	(Romania) Robert Patrick Fus	Challenger	5, 7
Citroën C3 Rally2	(Romania) Cristian Dolofan	Challenger	(Romania) Traian Pavel	Challenger	5, 7
Ford Fiesta R5	(Kenya) Hamza Anwar	Challenger	(Kenya) Adnan Din	Challenger	3
Ford Fiesta R5	(Kenya) Carl Tundo	Challenger	(Kenya) Tim Jessop	Challenger	3
Ford Fiesta Rally2	(Republic of Ireland) Eamonn Boland	Challenger	(Republic of Ireland) Michael Joseph Morrissey	Challenger	1, 4
Ford Fiesta Rally2	(Greece) George Vassilakis	Challenger	(United Kingdom) Allan Harryman	Challenger	3
Ford Fiesta Rally2	(Greece) Epaminondas Karanikolas	Challenger	(Greece) Giorgos Kakavas	Challenger	7
Hyundai i20 N Rally2	(France) Eric Camilli		(France) Thibault de la Haye		1
Hyundai i20 N Rally2	(Switzerland) Daniel Guex	Challenger	(France) Christopher Guieu	Challenger	1
Hyundai i20 N Rally2	(Luxembourg) Charles Munster	Challenger	(France) Loris Pascaud	Challenger	1
Hyundai i20 N Rally2	(Netherlands) Henk Vossen	Challenger	(Netherlands) Willem Vissenberg	Challenger	1
Hyundai i20 N Rally2	(Peru) Jorge Martínez Merizalde		(Argentina) Alberto Alvarez Nicholson		5
Hyundai i20 N Rally2	(Peru) Jorge Martínez Merizalde	Challenger	(Chile) José Alberto Aros	Challenger	10
Hyundai i20 N Rally2	(Paraguay) Miguel María García	Challenger	(Paraguay) Juan José Bilbao	Challenger	10
Škoda Fabia R5	(Switzerland) Jonathan Michellod	Challenger	(Switzerland) Stéphane Fellay	Challenger	1
Škoda Fabia R5	(Kenya) Karan Patel	Challenger	(Kenya) Tauseef Khan	Challenger	3
Škoda Fabia R5	(Kenya) Aakif Virani	Challenger	(Kenya) Zahir Shah	Challenger	3
Škoda Fabia R5	(Portugal) Ricardo Filipe	Challenger	(Portugal) Ricardo Faria	Challenger	5
Škoda Fabia R5	(Finland) Tommi Jylhä	Challenger	(Finland) Kimmo Nevanpää	Challenger	9
Škoda Fabia R5	(Paraguay) Matías Domínguez	Challenger	(Argentina) Diego Cagnotti	Challenger	10
Škoda Fabia Rally2 evo	(Switzerland) Olivier Burri	Challenger	(France) Anderson Levratti	Challenger	1
Škoda Fabia Rally2 evo	(Italy) Filippo Marchino	Challenger	(Italy) Pietro Elia Ometto	Challenger	1
Škoda Fabia Rally2 evo	(Kenya) Samman Singh Vohra	Challenger	(United Kingdom) Drew Sturrock	Challenger	3
Škoda Fabia Rally2 evo	(Spain) Miguel Díaz-Aboitiz	Challenger	(Spain) Diego Sanjuan de Eusebio	Challenger	3
Škoda Fabia Rally2 evo	(Spain) Antonio Forné	Challenger	(Spain) Axel Coronado	Challenger	4
Škoda Fabia Rally2 evo	(Portugal) Diogo Marujo	Challenger	(Portugal) Jorge Carvalho	Challenger	5
Škoda Fabia Rally2 evo	(Portugal) Lucas Simões	Challenger	(Portugal) Gonçalo Cunha	Challenger	5
Škoda Fabia Rally2 evo	(Portugal) Ernesto Cunha	Challenger	(Spain) Valter Cardoso	Challenger	5
Škoda Fabia Rally2 evo	(Portugal) Francisco Teixeira	Challenger	(Portugal) João Serôdio	Challenger	5
Škoda Fabia Rally2 evo	(Mexico) Miguel Granados	Challenger	(Spain) Marc Martí	Challenger	7
Škoda Fabia Rally2 evo	(Greece) Giorgos Amoutzas	Challenger	(Greece) Elias Panagiotounis	Challenger	7
Škoda Fabia Rally2 evo	(Paraguay) Sebastián González	Challenger	(Paraguay) Diego Fabiani	Challenger	10
Škoda Fabia Rally2 evo	(Paraguay) Juan Masi	Challenger	(Paraguay) Matías Ramos	Challenger	10
Škoda Fabia RS Rally2	(Czech Republic) Filip Kohn	Challenger	(United Kingdom) Ross Whittock	Challenger	1–2, 6
Škoda Fabia RS Rally2	(Italy) Roberto Daprà	Challenger	(Italy) Luca Guglielmetti	Challenger	1, 4–7
Škoda Fabia RS Rally2	(Italy) Maurizio Chiarani	Challenger	(Italy) Flavio Zanella	Challenger	1, 4, 9
Škoda Fabia RS Rally2	(Belgium) Maxime Potty	Challenger	(Belgium) Renaud Herman	Challenger	1, 5
Škoda Fabia RS Rally2	(Italy) Enrico Brazzoli	Challenger	(Italy) Martina Musiari	Challenger	1
Škoda Fabia RS Rally2	(Italy) Flavio Brega	Challenger	(Italy) Marco Zegna	Challenger	1
Škoda Fabia RS Rally2	(Bulgaria) Nikolay Gryazin	Challenger	(Kyrgyzstan) Konstantin Aleksandrov	Challenger	1
Škoda Fabia RS Rally2	(France) Matthieu Margaillan	Challenger	(France) Mathilde Margaillan	Challenger	1
Škoda Fabia RS Rally2	(Italy) Alberto Roveta	Challenger	(Italy) Nicolò Gonella	Challenger	1
Škoda Fabia RS Rally2	(Mexico) Miguel Granados	Challenger	(Spain) Marc Martí	Challenger	2, 4–6
Škoda Fabia RS Rally2	(Finland) Lauri Joona	Challenger	(Finland) Samu Vaaleri	Challenger	2, 5–9
Škoda Fabia RS Rally2	(Finland) Mikko Heikkilä	Challenger	(Finland) Kristian Temonen	Challenger	2, 5–6, 8–9
Škoda Fabia RS Rally2	(Mexico) Alejandro Mauro	Challenger	(Spain) Adrián Pérez	Challenger	2, 5, 7
Škoda Fabia RS Rally2	(Netherlands) Bernhard ten Brinke	Challenger	(United Kingdom) Tom Woodburn	Challenger	2, 5, 7–8
Škoda Fabia RS Rally2	(Poland) Jarosław Kołtun	Challenger	(Poland) Ireneusz Pleskot	Challenger	2
Škoda Fabia RS Rally2	(Sweden) Isak Reiersen	Challenger	(Sweden) Stefan Gustavsson	Challenger	2
Škoda Fabia RS Rally2	(Sweden) Pontus Tidemand		(Norway) Jørgen Eriksen		2
Škoda Fabia RS Rally2	(Estonia) Robert Virves	Challenger	(Estonia) Jakko Viilo	Challenger	2
Škoda Fabia RS Rally2	(United Kingdom) Gus Greensmith		(Sweden) Jonas Andersson		3, 5, 7, 10
Škoda Fabia RS Rally2	(Kenya) Jeremy Wahome	Challenger	(Kenya) Victor Okundi	Challenger	3
Škoda Fabia RS Rally2	(Argentina) Fernando Álvarez Castellano	Challenger	(Argentina) José Luis Díaz	Challenger	3
Škoda Fabia RS Rally2	(Poland) Daniel Chwist	Challenger	(Poland) Kamil Heller	Challenger	3
Škoda Fabia RS Rally2	(Mexico) Juan Carlos Peralta	Challenger	(Mexico) Victor Peréz	Challenger	4–6
Škoda Fabia RS Rally2	(United Kingdom) Philip Allen	Challenger	(United Kingdom) Dale Bowen	Challenger	4
Škoda Fabia RS Rally2	(Spain) Roberto Blach	Challenger	(Spain) Mauro Barreiro	Challenger	4
Škoda Fabia RS Rally2	(Japan) Osamu Fukunaga	Challenger	(Japan) Misako Saida	Challenger	4
Škoda Fabia RS Rally2	(Spain) Raúl Hernández	Challenger	(Spain) José Murado	Challenger	4
Škoda Fabia RS Rally2	(Spain) Roberto Rodríguez	Challenger	(Spain) Alba Rodríguez	Challenger	4
Škoda Fabia RS Rally2	(Portugal) Pedro Almeida	Challenger	(Portugal) António Costa	Challenger	5
Škoda Fabia RS Rally2	(Portugal) Armindo Araújo	Challenger	(Portugal) Luis Ramalho	Challenger	5
Škoda Fabia RS Rally2	(Portugal) Pedro Meireles	Challenger	(Portugal) Mário Castro	Challenger	5
Škoda Fabia RS Rally2	(Czech Republic) Martin Prokop	Challenger	(Czech Republic) Michal Ernst	Challenger	7, 9
Škoda Fabia RS Rally2	(Estonia) Egon Kaur	Challenger	(Estonia) Allan Birjukov	Challenger	7
Škoda Fabia RS Rally2	(Finland) Anssi Rytkönen	Challenger	(Finland) Juho-Ville Koskela	Challenger	9
Škoda Fabia RS Rally2	(Paraguay) Fabrizio Zaldivar	Challenger	(Italy) Marcelo Der Ohannesian	Challenger	10
Škoda Fabia RS Rally2	(Paraguay) Miguel Zaldivar	Challenger	(Argentina) Luis Allende	Challenger	10
Škoda Fabia RS Rally2	(Paraguay) Augusto Bestard	Challenger	(Spain) Borja Rozada	Challenger	10
Škoda Fabia RS Rally2	(Paraguay) Miguel Ángel García	Challenger	(Paraguay) Hernán Vargas Peña	Challenger	10
Škoda Fabia RS Rally2	(Paraguay) Mauricio González	Challenger	(Paraguay) Fernando Mendonca	Challenger	10
Škoda Fabia RS Rally2	(Paraguay) Franco Pappalardo	Challenger	(Paraguay) Juan Pablo Carrera	Challenger	10
Škoda Fabia RS Rally2	(Paraguay) Agustín Alonso	Challenger	(Paraguay) Edgardo Galindo	Challenger	10
Škoda Fabia RS Rally2	(Paraguay) Miguel Zaldivar	Challenger	(Argentina) Rubén García	Challenger	10
Toyota GR Yaris Rally2	(Estonia) Georg Linnamäe	Challenger	(United Kingdom) James Morgan	Challenger	2, 5, 7–9
Toyota GR Yaris Rally2	(Paraguay) Diego Domínguez Jr.	Challenger	(Spain) Rogelio Peñate	Challenger	3–4, 6, 10
Toyota GR Yaris Rally2	(Poland) Kajetan Kajetanowicz	Challenger	(Poland) Maciej Szczepaniak	Challenger	3, 5–7, 10
Toyota GR Yaris Rally2	(France) Mathieu Franceschi	Challenger	(France) Lucie Baud	Challenger	4–5
Toyota GR Yaris Rally2	(Spain) Carlos Moreno	Challenger	(Spain) Diego Fuentes	Challenger	4
Toyota GR Yaris Rally2	(Germany) Fabio Schwarz	Challenger	(Austria) Bernhard Ettel	Challenger	4–6
Toyota GR Yaris Rally2	(Bolivia) Bruno Bulacia	Challenger	(Brazil) Gabriel Morales	Challenger	5–7
Toyota GR Yaris Rally2	(Bolivia) Marco Bulacia	Challenger	(Brazil) Gabriel Morales	Challenger	10
Toyota GR Yaris Rally2	(Bolivia) Marco Bulacia	Challenger	(Spain) Diego Vallejo	Challenger	5–7
Toyota GR Yaris Rally2	(Spain) Alexander Villanueva	Challenger	(Spain) Diego Sanjuan	Challenger	5
Toyota GR Yaris Rally2	(Estonia) Joosep Ralf Nõgene	Challenger	(Estonia) Aleks Lesk	Challenger	8
Toyota GR Yaris Rally2	(Paraguay) Alejandro Galanti	Challenger	(Paraguay) Marcelo Toyotoshi	Challenger	10
Toyota GR Yaris Rally2	(Paraguay) Gustavo Saba	Challenger	(Argentina) José Díaz	Challenger	10
Toyota GR Yaris Rally2	(Paraguay) Tiago Weiler	Challenger	(Paraguay) Juan Sánchez	Challenger	10
Toyota GR Yaris Rally2	(Paraguay) Diego Domínguez	Challenger	(Argentina) Fernando Mussano	Challenger	10
Volkswagen Polo GTI R5	(Netherlands) Peter van Merksteijn Jr.	Challenger	(Netherlands) Erwin Berkhof	Challenger	5
Volkswagen Polo GTI R5	(Paraguay) Luis Ortega	Challenger	(Argentina) Leonardo Suaya	Challenger	10
Volkswagen Polo GTI R5	(Paraguay) Blas Zapag	Challenger	(Paraguay) Enrique Fratta	Challenger	10
Volkswagen Polo GTI R5	(Paraguay) Cesar Pedotti	Challenger	(Paraguay) Nicolas Elizaur	Challenger	10
Volkswagen Polo GTI R5	(Paraguay) Didier Arias	Challenger	(Paraguay) Hector Nunes	Challenger	10

=== In detail ===
Oliver Solberg and Elliott Edmondson signed with Printsport to drive a Toyota GR Yaris Rally2 for the team.

Newly-crowned WRC3 champions Diego Domínguez Jr. and Rogelio Penate is set to step up to the WRC2 category with Teo Martín Motorsport.

PH Sport announced the signs of Yohan Rossel and Léo Rossel as the drivers of their two factory supported Citroën C3 Rally2 cars.

Toksport WRT signed Robert Virves and Jakko Viilo to drive a full season with Škoda Fabia RS Rally2.

== Results and standings ==
=== Season summary ===
Round	Event	Winning driver	Winning co-driver	Winning entrant	Winning time	Report	Ref.
1	(Monaco) Rallye Automobile Monte Carlo	(France) Yohan Rossel	(France) Arnaud Dunand	(France) PH Sport	3:29:32.9	Report	
2	Rally Sweden	(Sweden) Oliver Solberg	(United Kingdom) Elliott Edmondson	(Finland) Printsport	2:42:02.3	Report	
3	Safari Rally Kenya	(United Kingdom) Gus Greensmith	(Sweden) Jonas Andersson	(United Kingdom) Gus Greensmith	4:34:15.4	Report	
4	(Spain) Rally Islas Canarias	(France) Yohan Rossel	(France) Arnaud Dunand	(France) PH Sport	3:01:50.5	Report	
5	Rally de Portugal	(Sweden) Oliver Solberg	(United Kingdom) Elliott Edmondson	(Finland) Printsport	3:57:51.0	Report	
6	(Italy) Rally Italia Sardegna	(Italy) Roberto Daprà	(Italy) Luca Guglielmetti	(Italy) Roberto Daprà	3:46:39.8	Report	
7	Acropolis Rally Greece	(Sweden) Oliver Solberg	(United Kingdom) Elliott Edmondson	(Finland) Printsport	4:22:54.8	Report	
8	Rally Estonia	(Estonia) Robert Virves	(Estonia) Jakko Viilo	(Germany) Toksport WRT	2:45:18.5	Report	
9	Rally Finland	(Finland) Roope Korhonen	(Finland) Anssi Viinikka	(Finland) Roope Korhonen	2:29:47.8	Report	
10	Rally del Paraguay	(Sweden) Oliver Solberg	(United Kingdom) Elliott Edmondson	(Finland) Printsport	3:07:00.4	Report	
11	Rally Chile	(Sweden) Oliver Solberg	(United Kingdom) Elliott Edmondson	(Finland) Printsport	3:04:00.7	Report	
12	(Europe) Central European Rally	(Czech Republic) Jan Černý	(Czech Republic) Ondřej Krajča	(Czech Republic) Jan Černý	2:47:11.2	Report	
13	Rally Japan	(Spain) Alejandro Cachón	(Spain) Borja Rozada	(Spain) Toyota España	3:31:50.5	Report	
14	Rally Saudi Arabia	(United Kingdom) Gus Greensmith	(Sweden) Jonas Andersson	(United Kingdom) Gus Greensmith	3:32:45.6	Report	

=== Scoring system ===
A team has to enter two cars to score points in an event. Drivers and teams must nominate a scoring rally when they enter the event and the best six scores from seven nominated rallies will count towards the final classification. Registered drivers are able to enter additional rallies with Priority 2 status without scoring points.

Position	1st	2nd	3rd	4th	5th	6th	7th	8th	9th	10th
Points	25	17	15	12	10	8	6	4	2	1

=== FIA WRC2 Championship for Drivers ===
Pos.	Driver	MON (Monaco)	SWE (Sweden)	KEN (Kenya)	ESP (Spain)	POR (Portugal)	ITA (Italy)	GRE (Greece)	EST (Estonia)	FIN (Finland)	PAR (Paraguay)	CHL (Chile)	EUR (Europe)	JPN (Japan)	SAU (Saudi Arabia)	Points
1	(Sweden) Oliver Solberg	NC	1	5	NC	1	NC	1		16	1	1	NC	NC	NC	135
2	(France) Yohan Rossel	1			1	2	17	3		NC	2	11				99
3	(Bulgaria) Nikolay Gryazin	NC			3		NC		Ret	NC	3	2	5	2	2	91
4	(United Kingdom) Gus Greensmith	NC		1		3		2		NC	15	13		Ret	1	82
5	(Estonia) Robert Virves		NC		NC	Ret	7	8	1	3	5				3	75
6	(Finland) Roope Korhonen		2			4	18		3	1					9	71
7	(Spain) Jan Solans			2		5	4	14				3		3	Ret	69
8	(Italy) Roberto Daprà	5			7	6	1	11					3			64
9	(Poland) Kajetan Kajetanowicz			6		10	2	4			13	6			6	54
10	(Spain) Alejandro Cachón				2	Ret	14	5					Ret	1	Ret	52
11	(Paraguay) Fabrizio Zaldivar		6	3		12	Ret	16	NC		4	5				45
12	(Czech Republic) Jan Černý	4			8					9			1			43
13	(Estonia) Romet Jürgenson		7		27	11	5		5	6						34
14	(Finland) Lauri Joona		4			25	6	10	6	8						33
15	(Finland) Mikko Heikkilä		3			8	Ret	WD	4	Ret						31
16	(Czech Republic) Martin Prokop						3	6		7						29
17	(Finland) Emil Lindholm				6		Ret	7		4		Ret				26
18	(Paraguay) Diego Domínguez Jr.			Ret	9		10				17			6	4	23
19	(Japan) Yuki Yamamoto		9		Ret	23		20	7	5				Ret		18
20	(Czech Republic) Filip Mareš												2			17
21	(Finland) Jari-Matti Latvala									2						17
22	(Estonia) Georg Linnamäe		14			30		Ret	2	Ret						17
23	(France) Eric Camilli	2														17
24	(France) Léo Rossel	3			Ret	13	Ret	9	Ret				Ret			17
25	(Republic of Ireland) Eamonn Boland	16			22								4			12
26	(Poland) Daniel Chwist			4											Ret	12
27	(Spain) Efrén Llarena				4											12
28	(Chile) Jorge Fontena											4				12
29	(Finland) Heikki Kovalainen													4		12
30	(Spain) Diego Ruiloba				5	Ret	Ret	Ret	9				Ret			12
31	(France) Pablo Sarrazin	6				Ret	8	Ret		11					Ret	12
32	(Qatar) Abdulaziz Al-Kuwari						13	12							5	10
33	(Sweden) Isak Reiersen		5													10
34	(Japan) Hiroki Arai													5		10
35	(Germany) Fabio Schwarz				11	Ret	Ret	19					6		Ret	8
36	(Paraguay) Augusto Bestard										6					8
37	(Mexico) Alejandro Mauro		10			29		Ret	DNS						7	7
38	(France) Pierre-Louis Loubet					7	DNS	WD								6
39	(Luxembourg) Charles Munster	7														6
40	(Kenya) Carl Tundo			7												6
41	(Paraguay) Tiago Weiler										7					6
42	(Chile) Gerardo Valenzuela											7				6
43	(Japan) Takuma Kamada													7		6
44	(Belgium) Maxime Potty	8			WD	WD										4
45	(Sweden) Pontus Tidemand		8													4
46	(Kenya) Jeremy Wahome			8												4
47	(Estonia) Joosep Ralf Nõgene								8							4
48	(Paraguay) Franco Pappalardo										8					4
49	(Argentina) Martin Scuncio											8				4
50	(Japan) Fumio Nutahara													8		4
51	(Saudi Arabia) Hamza Bakhashab														8	4
52	(Italy) Giovanni Trentin				12	Ret	9	Ret		10						3
53	(Spain) Miguel Díaz-Aboitiz			9											11	2
54	(France) Sarah Rumeau	9				17	Ret	Ret		12						2
55	(Bolivia) Marco Bulacia					9	Ret	Ret	WD	WD	WD					2
56	(Paraguay) Miguel Zaldivar										9					2
57	(Chile) Emilio Rosselot											9				2
58	(Japan) Satoshi Imai													9		2
59	(Paraguay) Alejandro Galanti										10	10				2
60	(Czech Republic) Filip Kohn	10	11				WD									1
61	(Netherlands) Bernhard ten Brinke		Ret			40		44	10							1
62	(Kenya) Samman Singh Vohra			10												1
63	(Spain) Luis Monzón				10											1
64	(Qatar) Nasser Khalifa Al-Attiyah														10	1
Pos.	Driver	MON (Monaco)	SWE (Sweden)	KEN (Kenya)	ESP (Spain)	POR (Portugal)	ITA (Italy)	GRE (Greece)	EST (Estonia)	FIN (Finland)	PAR (Paraguay)	CHL (Chile)	EUR (Europe)	JPN (Japan)	SAU (Saudi Arabia)	Points

Key
Colour	Result
Gold	Winner
Silver	2nd place
Bronze	3rd place
Green	Points finish
Blue	Non-points finish
Blue	Non-classified finish (NC)
Purple	Did not finish (Ret)
Black	Excluded (EX)
Black	Disqualified (DSQ)
White	Did not start (DNS)
White	Cancelled (C)
Blank	Withdrew entry from the event (WD)

=== FIA WRC2 Championship for Co-drivers ===
Pos.	Co-driver	MON (Monaco)	SWE (Sweden)	KEN (Kenya)	ESP (Spain)	POR (Portugal)	ITA (Italy)	GRE (Greece)	EST (Estonia)	FIN (Finland)	PAR (Paraguay)	CHL (Chile)	EUR (Europe)	JPN (Japan)	SAU (Saudi Arabia)	Points
1	(United Kingdom) Elliott Edmondson	NC	1	5	NC	1	NC	1		16	1	1	NC	NC	NC	135
2	(France) Arnaud Dunand	1			1	2	17	3		NC	2	11				99
3	(Kyrgyzstan) Konstantin Aleksandrov				3				Ret		3	2	5	2	2	91
4	(Sweden) Jonas Andersson	NC		1		3		2		NC	15	13		Ret	1	82
5	(Estonia) Jakko Viilo					Ret	7	8	1	3	5				3	75
6	(Finland) Anssi Viinikka		2			4	18		3	1					9	71
7	(Spain) Rodrigo Sanjuan de Eusebio			2		5	4	14				3		3	Ret	69
8	(Spain) Borja Rozada				2	Ret	14	5			6		Ret	1		60
9	(Italy) Luca Guglielmetti	5			7		1	11					3			56
10	(Poland) Maciej Szczepaniak			6		10	2	4			13	6			6	54
11	(Italy) Marcelo Der Ohannesian		6	3		12	Ret	16			4	5				45
12	(Czech Republic) Ondřej Krajča	4											1			37
13	(Estonia) Siim Oja		7		27	11	5		5	6						34
14	(Finland) Samu Vaaleri		4			25	6	10	6	8						33
15	(Finland) Kristian Temonen		3			8	Ret	WD	4	Ret						31
16	(Czech Republic) Michal Ernst						3	6		7						29
17	(Finland) Reeta Hämäläinen				6		Ret		7	4		Ret				26
18	(Spain) Rogelio Peñate			Ret	9		10				17	Ret		6	4	23
19	(United Kingdom) James Morgan		14		NC	30		Ret	2	Ret						17
20	(France) Thibault de la Haye	2														17
21	(Finland) Janni Hussi									2						17
22	(Czech Republic) Radovan Bucha												2			17
23	(France) Guillaume Mercoiret	3			Ret	13	Ret	9		Ret			Ret			17
24	(Finland) Topi Matias Luhtinen	NC	17		15	15	Ret	Ret	7	5						16
25	(Sweden) Stefan Gustavsson		5					7								16
26	(Argentina) Rubén García										9	4				14
27	(Republic of Ireland) Michael Joseph Morrissey	16			22								4			12
28	(Poland) Kamil Heller			4											Ret	12
29	(Spain) Sara Fernández				4											12
30	(France) Loris Pascaud	7				7	DNS	WD								12
31	(Spain) Ángel Vela				5	Ret	Ret	Ret	9							12
32	(Japan) Sae Kitagawa													4		12
33	(Japan) Hiroki Tachikui													5		10
34	(Italy) Giovanni Bernacchini														5	10
35	(Germany) Pascal Raabe												6		Ret	8
36	(France) Geoffrey Combe	6														8
37	(Italy) Luca Beltrame					6										8
38	(Italy) Marcelo Brizio					Ret						7				6
39	(Kenya) Tim Jessop			7												6
40	(Paraguay) Juan Sánchez										7					6
41	(Japan) Yuichi Matsumoto													7		6
42	(Czech Republic) Jan Hloušek				8					9						6
43	(France) Yannick Roche					Ret	8	Ret		11					Ret	4
44	(Republic of Ireland) Lorcan Moore						13								8	4
45	(Belgium) Renaud Herman	8			WD	WD										4
46	(Norway) Jørgen Eriksen		8													4
47	(Kenya) Victor Okundi			8												4
48	(Estonia) Aleks Lesk								8							4
49	(Paraguay) Juan Pablo Carrera										8					4
50	(Chile) Javiera Roman											8				4
51	(Japan) Shungo Azuma													8		4
52	(France) Julie Amblard	9				17	Ret	Ret		12				Ret		2
53	(Italy) Pietro Elia Ometto	19			23		9	Ret								2
54	(Republic of Ireland) James Fulton		9		Ret	23		20								2
55	(Spain) Diego Vallejo					9	Ret	Ret	WD							2
56	(Spain) Miquel Ibáñez Sotos			9												2
57	(Chile) Matias Leiva											9				2
58	(Japan) Fuyu Takahashi													9		2
59	(Paraguay) Marcelo Toyotoshi										10	10				2
60	(United Kingdom) Ross Whittock	10	11													1
61	(Italy) Alessandro Franco				14	Ret				10						1
62	(United Kingdom) Tom Woodburn		Ret			20		22	10							1
63	(Spain) Adrián Pérez		10			29		Ret	WD							1
64	(United Kingdom) Drew Sturrock			10												1
65	(Spain) José Carlos Déniz				10											1
66	(Lebanon) Ziad Chehab														10	1
Pos.	Co-driver	MON (Monaco)	SWE (Sweden)	KEN (Kenya)	ESP (Spain)	POR (Portugal)	ITA (Italy)	GRE (Greece)	EST (Estonia)	FIN (Finland)	PAR (Paraguay)	CHL (Chile)	EUR (Europe)	JPN (Japan)	SAU (Saudi Arabia)	Points

Key
Colour	Result
Gold	Winner
Silver	2nd place
Bronze	3rd place
Green	Points finish
Blue	Non-points finish
Blue	Non-classified finish (NC)
Purple	Did not finish (Ret)
Black	Excluded (EX)
Black	Disqualified (DSQ)
White	Did not start (DNS)
White	Cancelled (C)
Blank	Withdrew entry from the event (WD)

=== FIA WRC2 Championship for Teams ===
Pos.	Team	MON (Monaco)	SWE (Sweden)	KEN (Kenya)	ESP (Spain)	POR (Portugal)	ITA (Italy)	GRE (Greece)	EST (Estonia)	FIN (Finland)	PAR (Paraguay)	CHL (Chile)	EUR (Europe)	JPN (Japan)	SAU (Saudi Arabia)	Points
1	(Germany) Toksport WRT				2			2	1	1	1	1			1	215
1	(Germany) Toksport WRT				3			3	Ret	2	2	Ret			2	215
2	(France) PH Sport	1			1	1	2	1		3						178
2	(France) PH Sport	2			Ret	2	Ret	4		Ret						178
3	(Japan) Toyota Gazoo Racing WRT NG		1		4	3		5								89
3	(Japan) Toyota Gazoo Racing WRT NG		2		Ret	5		Ret								89
4	(Italy) Sarrazin Motorsport – Iron Lynx	3				4	1									64
4	(Italy) Sarrazin Motorsport – Iron Lynx	4				Ret	Ret									64
Pos.	Team	MON (Monaco)	SWE (Sweden)	KEN (Kenya)	ESP (Spain)	POR (Portugal)	ITA (Italy)	GRE (Greece)	EST (Estonia)	FIN (Finland)	PAR (Paraguay)	CHL (Chile)	EUR (Europe)	JPN (Japan)	SAU (Saudi Arabia)	Points

Key
Colour	Result
Gold	Winner
Silver	2nd place
Bronze	3rd place
Green	Points finish
Blue	Non-points finish
Blue	Non-classified finish (NC)
Purple	Did not finish (Ret)
Black	Excluded (EX)
Black	Disqualified (DSQ)
White	Did not start (DNS)
White	Cancelled (C)
Blank	Withdrew entry from the event (WD)

=== FIA WRC2 Challenger Championship for Drivers ===
Pos.	Driver	MON (Monaco)	SWE (Sweden)	KEN (Kenya)	ESP (Spain)	POR (Portugal)	ITA (Italy)	GRE (Greece)	EST (Estonia)	FIN (Finland)	PAR (Paraguay)	CHL (Chile)	EUR (Europe)	JPN (Japan)	SAU (Saudi Arabia)	Points
1	(Bulgaria) Nikolay Gryazin				2				Ret		1	1	5	2	1	119
2	(Finland) Roope Korhonen		1			1	17		3	1					8	94
3	(Estonia) Robert Virves					Ret	7	4	1	2	3				2	92
4	(Spain) Jan Solans			1		2	4	10				2		3	Ret	87
5	(Italy) Roberto Daprà	3			5	3	1	7					3			86
6	(Poland) Kajetan Kajetanowicz			4		6	2	1			11	5			5	82
7	(Spain) Alejandro Cachón				1	Ret	14	2					Ret	1	Ret	67
8	(Paraguay) Fabrizio Zaldivar		5	2		8	Ret	12			2	4				60
9	(Czech Republic) Jan Černý	2			6					7			1			56
10	(Finland) Lauri Joona		3			21	6	6	6	6						47
11	(Finland) Mikko Heikkilä		2			4	Ret	WD	4	Ret						41
12	(Czech Republic) Martin Prokop						3	3		5						40
13	(France) Léo Rossel	1			Ret	9	Ret	5		Ret			Ret			37
14	(Estonia) Romet Jürgenson		6		25	7	5		5	4						36
15	(Paraguay) Diego Dominguez Jr.			Ret	7		10				14	Ret		6	3	30
16	(Japan) Yuki Yamamoto		7		Ret	19		16	7	3				Ret		27
17	(France) Pablo Sarrazin	4				Ret	8	Ret		9					Ret	18
18	(Estonia) Georg Linnamäe		12		NC	26		Ret	2	Ret						17
19	(Czech Republic) Filip Mareš												2			17
20	(Qatar) Abdulaziz Al-Kuwari						13	8							4	16
21	(Peru) Jorge Martínez Merizalde					Ret					12	3				15
22	(Poland) Daniel Chwist			3											Ret	15
23	(Spain) Efrén Llarena				3											15
24	(Spain) Diego Ruiloba				4	Ret	Ret	Ret	9							14
25	(Republic of Ireland) Eamonn Boland	14			20								4			12
26	(Sweden) Isak Reiersen		4													12
27	(Paraguay) Augusto Bestard										4					12
28	(Finland) Heikki Kovalainen													4		12
29	(Mexico) Alejandro Mauro		8			25		Ret	WD						6	12
30	(Bolivia) Marco Bulacia					5	Ret	Ret	WD	WD	WD	WD				10
31	(Luxembourg) Charles Munster	5														10
32	(Kenya) Carl Tundo			5												10
33	(Paraguay) Tiago Weiler										5					10
34	(Japan) Hiroki Arai													5		10
35	(Germany) Fabio Schwarz				9	Ret	Ret	15	11				6		Ret	10
36	(Belgium) Maxime Potty	6			WD	WD										8
37	(Kenya) Jeremy Wahome			6												8
38	(Paraguay) Franco Pappalardo										6					8
39	(Chile) Gerardo V. Rosselot											6				8
40	(France) Sarah Rumeau	7				13	Ret	Ret		10						7
41	(Spain) Miguel Díaz-Aboitiz			7											10	7
42	(Italy) Giovanni Trentin				10	Ret	9	Ret		8						7
43	(Paraguay) Miguel Zaldivar										7					6
44	(Japan) Takuma Kamada											7				6
45	(Japan) Hiroki Arai													7		6
46	(Saudi Arabia) Hamza Bakhashab														7	6
47	(Czech Republic) Filip Kohn	8	9				WD									6
48	(Paraguay) Alejandro Galanti										8	9				6
49	(Kenya) Samman Singh Vohra			8												4
50	(Spain) Luis Monzón				8											4
51	(Estonia) Joosep Ralf Nõgene								8							4
52	(Chile) Emilio Rosselot											8				4
53	(Japan) Fumio Nutahara													8		4
54	(Mexico) Miguel Granados	13			16	27	12	9				11			Ret	2
55	(Switzerland) Olivier Burri	9														2
56	(Paraguay) Miguel Ángel García										9					2
57	(Japan) Satoshi Imai													9		2
58	(Qatar) Nasser Khalifa Al-Attiyah														9	2
59	(Bolivia) Bruno Bulacia					10	Ret	14								1
60	(Netherlands) Bernhard ten Brinke		Ret			16		22	10							1
61	(Switzerland) Jonathan Michellod	10														1
62	(Poland) Michał Sołowow		10													1
63	(Paraguay) Gustavo Saba										10					1
64	(Chile) Pedro Heller											10				1
Pos.	Driver	MON (Monaco)	SWE (Sweden)	KEN (Kenya)	ESP (Spain)	POR (Portugal)	ITA (Italy)	GRE (Greece)	EST (Estonia)	FIN (Finland)	PAR (Paraguay)	CHL (Chile)	EUR (Europe)	JPN (Japan)	SAU (Saudi Arabia)	Points

Key
Colour	Result
Gold	Winner
Silver	2nd place
Bronze	3rd place
Green	Points finish
Blue	Non-points finish
Blue	Non-classified finish (NC)
Purple	Did not finish (Ret)
Black	Excluded (EX)
Black	Disqualified (DSQ)
White	Did not start (DNS)
White	Cancelled (C)
Blank	Withdrew entry from the event (WD)

=== FIA WRC2 Challenger Championship for Co-drivers ===
Pos.	Co-driver	MON (Monaco)	SWE (Sweden)	KEN (Kenya)	ESP (Spain)	POR (Portugal)	ITA (Italy)	GRE (Greece)	EST (Estonia)	FIN (Finland)	PAR (Paraguay)	CHL (Chile)	EUR (Europe)	JPN (Japan)	SAU (Saudi Arabia)	Points
1	(Kyrgyzstan) Konstantin Aleksandrov				2				Ret		1	1	5	2	1	119
2	(Finland) Anssi Viinikka		1			1	17		3	1					8	94
3	(Estonia) Jakko Viilo					Ret	7	4	1	2	3				2	92
4	(Spain) Diego Sanjuan de Eusebio			1		2	4	10				2		3	Ret	87
5	(Poland) Maciej Szczepaniak			4		6	2	1			11	5			5	82
6	(Spain) Borja Rozada				1	Ret	14	2			4		Ret	1		79
7	(Italy) Luca Guglielmetti	3			5		1	7					3			71
8	(Italy) Marcelo Der Ohannesian		5	2		8	Ret	12			2	4				60
9	(Finland) Samu Vaaleri		3			21	6	6	6	6						47
10	(Estonia) Siim Oja		6		25	7	5		5	4						46
11	(Czech Republic) Ondřej Krajča	2											1			42
12	(Finland) Kristian Temonen		2			4	Ret	WD	4	Ret						41
13	(France) Michal Ernst						3	3		5						40
14	(France) Guillaume Mercoiret	1			Ret	9	Ret	5					Ret			37
15	(Spain) Rogelio Peñate			Ret	7		10				14	Ret		6	3	30
16	(Finland) Topi Matias Luhtinen	NC	15		Ret	13		11	7	3						21
17	(Argentina) Rubén García										7	3				21
18	(United Kingdom) James Morgan		12		NC	26		Ret	2	Ret						17
19	(Czech Republic) Radovan Bucha												2			17
20	(Poland) Kamil Heller			3											Ret	15
21	(Spain) Sara Fernández				3											15
22	(Italy) Luca Beltrame					3										15
23	(Spain) Ángel Vela				4	Ret	Ret	Ret	9				Ret			14
24	(Czech Republic) Jan Hloušek				6					7						14
25	(Republic of Ireland) Michael Joseph Morrissey	14			20								4			12
26	(France) Geoffrey Combe	4														12
27	(Sweden) Stefan Gustavsson		4													12
28	(Japan) Sae Kitagawa													4		12
29	(Italy) Giovanni Bernacchini														4	12
30	(Spain) Adrián Pérez		8			25		Ret	WD						6	12
31	(France) Loris Pascaud	5					DNS									10
32	(Kenya) Tim Jessop			5												10
33	(Paraguay) Juan Sánchez										5					10
34	(Japan) Hiroki Tachikui													5		10
35	(Spain) Diego Vallejo					5	Ret	Ret	WD							10
36	(Argentina) Marcelo Brizio					Ret						6				8
37	(Germany) Pascal Raabe												6		Ret	8
38	(Belgium) Renaud Herman	6			WD	WD										8
39	(Kenya) Victor Okundi			6												8
40	(Paraguay) Juan Pablo Carrera										6					8
41	(France) Julie Amblard	7				13	Ret	Ret		10						7
42	(Republic of Ireland) Lorcan Moore						13								7	6
43	(Republic of Ireland) James Fulton		7		Ret	19		16						Ret		6
44	(Spain) Miquel Ibáñez Sotos			7												6
45	(Chile) Javiera Roman											7				6
46	(Japan) Yuichi Matsumoto													7		6
47	(United Kingdom) Ross Whittock	8	9				WD									6
48	(France) Yannick Roche					Ret	8	Ret		9					Ret	6
49	(Paraguay) Marcelo Toyotoshi										8	9				6
50	(Italy) Alessandro Franco				10	Ret				8						5
51	(United Kingdom) Drew Sturrock			8												4
52	(Spain) José Murado				8											4
53	(Poland) Szymon Gospodarczyk							8								4
54	(Estonia) Aleks Lesk								8							4
55	(Chile) Matias Leiva											8				4
56	(Japan) Shungo Azuma													8		4
57	(Spain) Marc Martí	13			16	27	12	9				11			Ret	2
58	(Italy) Pietro Elia Ometto	17			21		9	Ret								2
59	(Austria) Bernhard Ettel				9	Ret	Ret	15	11							2
60	(France) Anderson Levratti	9														2
61	(Paraguay) Hernán Vargas Peña										9					2
62	(Japan) Fuyu Takahashi													9		2
63	(Lebanon) Ziad Chehab														9	2
64	(Brazil) Gabriel Morales					10	Ret	14		WD	WD	WD				1
65	(Spain) Diego Sanjuan					Ret									10	1
66	(United Kingdom) Tom Woodburn		Ret			16		22	10							1
67	(Switzerland) Stéphane Fellay	10														1
68	(Poland) Maciej Baran		10													1
69	(Argentina) José Díaz										10					1
70	(Chile) Matias Amestica											10				1
Pos.	Co-driver	MON (Monaco)	SWE (Sweden)	KEN (Kenya)	ESP (Spain)	POR (Portugal)	ITA (Italy)	GRE (Greece)	EST (Estonia)	FIN (Finland)	PAR (Paraguay)	CHL (Chile)	EUR (Europe)	JPN (Japan)	SAU (Saudi Arabia)	Points

Key
Colour	Result
Gold	Winner
Silver	2nd place
Bronze	3rd place
Green	Points finish
Blue	Non-points finish
Blue	Non-classified finish (NC)
Purple	Did not finish (Ret)
Black	Excluded (EX)
Black	Disqualified (DSQ)
White	Did not start (DNS)
White	Cancelled (C)
Blank	Withdrew entry from the event (WD)
