= 2025 Rally Islas Canarias =

49th edition of the Rally Islas Canarias

2025 Rally Islas Canarias Rally Islas Canarias 2025
Round 4 of 14 in the 2025 World Rally Championship
← Previous event	Next event →
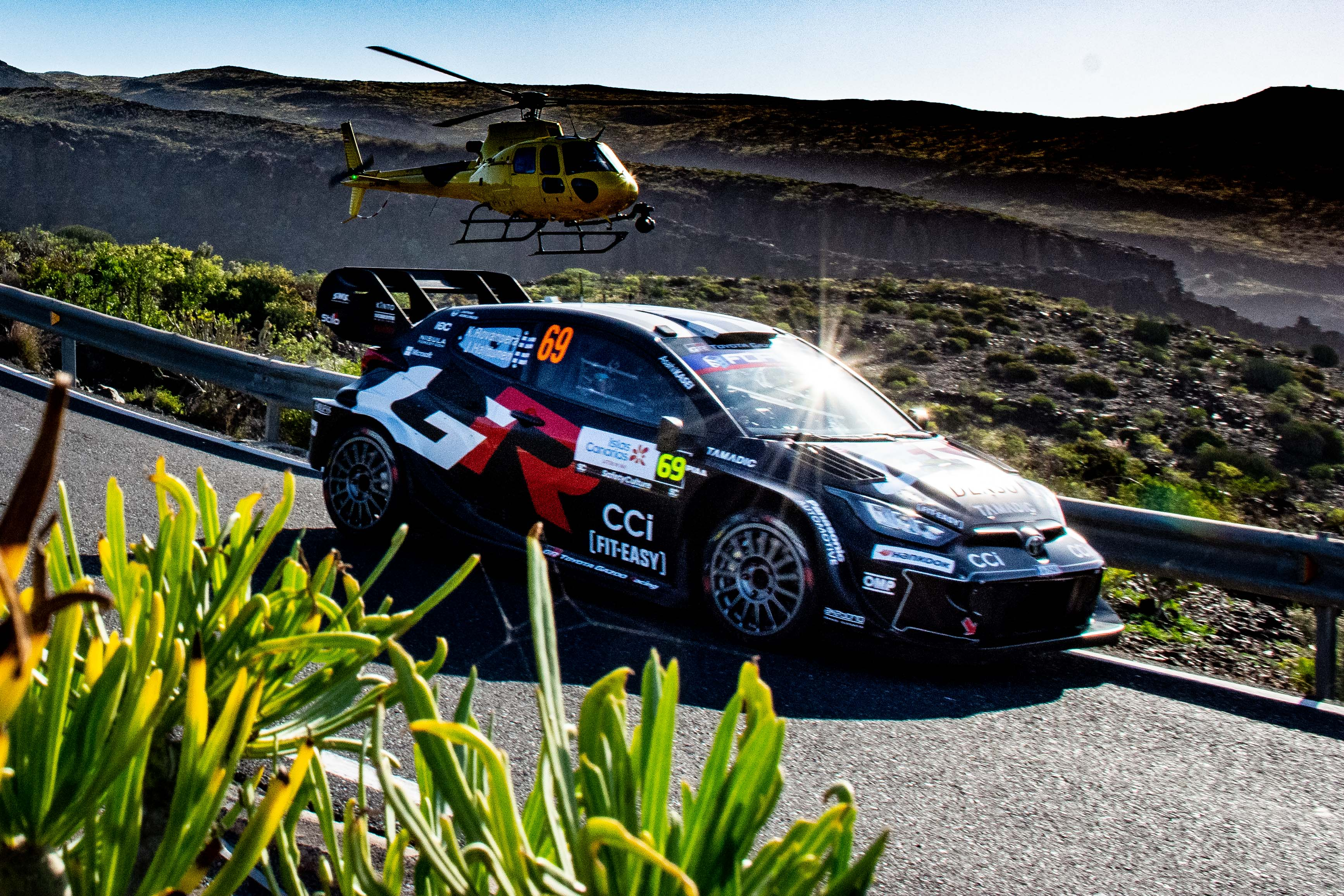
- Rally winners Kalle Rovanperä and Jonne Halttunen driving a Toyota GR Yaris Rally1 during the rally.
- Host country: Spain
- Rally base: Las Palmas, Gran Canaria
- Dates run: 24 – 27 April 2025
- Start location: Valsequillo de Gran Canaria, Gran Canaria
- Finish location: Maspalomas, Gran Canaria
- Stages: 18 (301.30 km; 187.22 miles)
- Stage surface: Tarmac
- Transport distance: 780.90 km (485.23 miles)
- Overall distance: 1,082.20 km (672.45 miles)

Statistics
- Crews registered: 63
- Crews: 59 at start, 53 at finish

Overall results
- Overall winner: (Finland) Kalle Rovanperä (Finland) Jonne Halttunen (Japan) Toyota Gazoo Racing WRT; 2:54:39.8
- Sunday Accumulated leader: (Finland) Kalle Rovanperä (Finland) Jonne Halttunen (Japan) Toyota Gazoo Racing WRT; 32:22.5
- Power Stage winner: (Finland) Kalle Rovanperä (Finland) Jonne Halttunen (Japan) Toyota Gazoo Racing WRT; 6:39.1

Support category results
- WRC-2 winner: (France) Yohan Rossel (France) Arnaud Dunand (France) PH Sport; 3:01:50.5
- WRC-3 winner: (France) Mattéo Chatillon (France) Maxence Cornuau; 3:14:39.9

The 2025 Rally Islas Canarias was a motor racing event for rally cars held over four days from 24 to 27 April 2025. It marked the forty-ninth running of the Rally Islas Canarias, and was the fourth round of the 2025 World Rally Championship, 2025 WRC2 Championship and 2025 WRC3 Championship. The 2025 event was based in Las Palmas on the island of Gran Canaria, and consisted of eighteen special stages, covering a total competitive distance of 301.30 km (187.22 mi).

Kalle Rovanperä and Jonne Halttunen won the rally, and their team, Toyota Gazoo Racing WRT, were the manufacturer's winners. Yohan Rossel and Arnaud Dunand were the winners in WRC2 category. Mattéo Chatillon and Maxence Cornuau were the winners in the WRC3 category.

== Background ==
=== Entry list ===
The following crews entered into the rally. The event was opened to crews competing in the World Rally Championship, its support categories, the WRC2 Championship, the WRC3 Championship and privateer entries that were not registered to score points in any championship. Ten entered under Rally1 regulations, as were thirty-four Rally2 crews in the WRC2 Championship and eight Rally3 crew in the WRC3 Championship.

Rally1 entries competing in the World Rally Championship
No.	Driver	Co-Driver	Entrant	Car	Championship eligibility	Tyre
1	(Belgium) Thierry Neuville	(Belgium) Martijn Wydaeghe	(South Korea) Hyundai Shell Mobis WRT	Hyundai i20 N Rally1	Driver, Co-driver, Manufacturer	H
5	(Finland) Sami Pajari	(Finland) Marko Salminen	(Japan) Toyota Gazoo Racing WRT2	Toyota GR Yaris Rally1	Driver, Co-driver, Manufacturer, Team	H
8	(Estonia) Ott Tänak	(Estonia) Martin Järveoja	(South Korea) Hyundai Shell Mobis WRT	Hyundai i20 N Rally1	Driver, Co-driver, Manufacturer	H
13	(Luxembourg) Grégoire Munster	(Belgium) Louis Louka	(United Kingdom) M-Sport Ford WRT	Ford Puma Rally1	Driver, Co-driver, Manufacturer	H
16	(France) Adrien Fourmaux	(France) Alexandre Coria	(South Korea) Hyundai Shell Mobis WRT	Hyundai i20 N Rally1	Driver, Co-driver, Manufacturer	H
17	(France) Sébastien Ogier	(France) Vincent Landais	(Japan) Toyota Gazoo Racing WRT	Toyota GR Yaris Rally1	Driver, Co-driver, Manufacturer	H
18	(Japan) Takamoto Katsuta	(Republic of Ireland) Aaron Johnston	(Japan) Toyota Gazoo Racing WRT	Toyota GR Yaris Rally1	Driver, Co-driver	H
33	(United Kingdom) Elfyn Evans	(United Kingdom) Scott Martin	(Japan) Toyota Gazoo Racing WRT	Toyota GR Yaris Rally1	Driver, Co-driver, Manufacturer	H
55	(Republic of Ireland) Josh McErlean	(Republic of Ireland) Eoin Treacy	(United Kingdom) M-Sport Ford WRT	Ford Puma Rally1	Driver, Co-driver, Manufacturer	H
69	(Finland) Kalle Rovanperä	(Finland) Jonne Halttunen	(Japan) Toyota Gazoo Racing WRT	Toyota GR Yaris Rally1	Driver, Co-driver, Manufacturer	H

Rally2 entries competing in the WRC2 Championship
No.	Driver	Co-Driver	Entrant	Car	Championship eligibility	Tyre
21	(France) Yohan Rossel	(France) Arnaud Dunand	(France) PH Sport	Citroën C3 Rally2	Driver, Co-driver, Team	H
22	(France) Léo Rossel	(France) Guillaume Mercoiret	(France) PH Sport	Citroën C3 Rally2	Challenger Driver, Challenger Co-driver, Team	H
23	(Czech Republic) Jan Černý	(Czech Republic) Jan Hloušek	(Czech Republic) Jan Černý	Citroën C3 Rally2	Challenger Driver, Challenger Co-driver	H
24	(Italy) Roberto Daprà	(Italy) Luca Guglielmetti	(Italy) Roberto Daprà	Škoda Fabia RS Rally2	Challenger Driver, Challenger Co-driver	H
25	(Estonia) Romet Jürgenson	(Estonia) Siim Oja	FIA Rally Star	Ford Fiesta Rally2	Challenger Driver, Challenger Co-driver	H
26	(Belgium) Maxime Potty	(Belgium) Renaud Herman	(Belgium) Maxime Potty	Citroën C3 Rally2	Challenger Driver, Challenger Co-driver	H
27	(Japan) Yuki Yamamoto	(Republic of Ireland) James Fulton	(Japan) Toyota Gazoo Racing WRT NG	Toyota GR Yaris Rally2	Challenger Driver, Challenger Co-driver, Team	H
28	(Bulgaria) Nikolay Gryazin	(Kyrgyzstan) Konstantin Aleksandrov	(Germany) Toksport WRT	Škoda Fabia RS Rally2	Challenger Driver, Challenger Co-driver, Team	H
29	(Finland) Emil Lindholm	(Finland) Reeta Hämäläinen	(Germany) Toksport WRT	Škoda Fabia RS Rally2	Driver, Co-driver, Team	H
30	(France) Mathieu Franceschi	(France) Lucie Baud	(France) Mathieu Franceschi	Toyota GR Yaris Rally2	Challenger Driver, Challenger Co-driver	H
31	(Spain) Alejandro Cachón	(Spain) Borja Rozada	(Spain) Toyota España	Toyota GR Yaris Rally2	Challenger Driver, Challenger Co-driver	H
32	(Spain) Diego Ruiloba	(Spain) Ángel Vela	(Spain) Diego Ruiloba	Citroën C3 Rally2	Challenger Driver, Challenger Co-driver	H
34	(Spain) Efrén Llarena	(Spain) Sara Fernández	(Spain) Efrén Llarena	Citroën C3 Rally2	Challenger Driver, Challenger Co-driver	H
35	(Paraguay) Diego Dominguez Jr.	(Spain) Rogelio Peñate	(Paraguay) Diego Dominguez Jr.	Toyota GR Yaris Rally2	Challenger Driver, Challenger Co-driver	H
36	(Spain) Luis Monzón	(Spain) José Carlos Déniz	(Spain) Auto-Laca Competición	Citroën C3 Rally2	Challenger Driver, Challenger Co-driver	H
37	(Spain) Yeray Lemes	(Spain) Aitor Cambeiro	(Spain) C.D. Todo Sport	Citroën C3 Rally2	Challenger Driver, Challenger Co-driver	H
38	(Spain) Roberto Blach	(Spain) Mauro Barreiro	(Spain) Roberto Blach	Škoda Fabia RS Rally2	Challenger Driver, Challenger Co-driver	H
39	(Germany) Fabio Schwarz	(Austria) Bernhard Ettel	(Germany) Fabio Schwarz	Toyota GR Yaris Rally2	Challenger Driver, Challenger Co-driver	H
40	(Spain) Raúl Hernández	(Spain) José Murado	(Spain) Raúl Hernández	Škoda Fabia RS Rally2	Challenger Driver, Challenger Co-driver	H
42	(United Kingdom) Philip Allen	(United Kingdom) Craig Drew	(United Kingdom) Philip Allen	Škoda Fabia RS Rally2	Challenger Driver, Challenger Co-driver	H
44	(Spain) Antonio Forné	(Spain) Axel Coronado	(Spain) Escudería Costa Brava	Škoda Fabia Rally2 evo	Challenger Driver, Challenger Co-driver	H
45	(Japan) Hikaru Kogure	(Finland) Topi Matias Luhtinen	(Japan) Toyota Gazoo Racing WRT NG	Toyota GR Yaris Rally2	Challenger Driver, Challenger Co-driver, Team	H
46	(Spain) Roberto Rodríguez	(Spain) Alba Rodríguez	(Spain) ACSM Rallye Team	Škoda Fabia RS Rally2	Challenger Driver, Challenger Co-driver	H
47	(Spain) Carlos Moreno	(Spain) Diego Fuentes	(Spain) Automóvil Club Murcia	Toyota GR Yaris Rally2	Challenger Driver, Challenger Co-driver	H
48	(Italy) Giovanni Trentin	(Italy) Alessandro Franco	(Italy) MT Racing SRL	Škoda Fabia RS Rally2	Challenger Driver, Challenger Co-driver	H
49	(Mexico) Juan Carlos Peralta	(Mexico) Victor Peréz	(Mexico) Juan Carlos Peralta	Škoda Fabia RS Rally2	Challenger Driver, Challenger Co-driver	H
50	(Turkey) Uğur Soylu	(Turkey) Sener Güray	(Turkey) GP Garage My Team	Škoda Fabia RS Rally2	Challenger/Masters Driver, Challenger Co-driver	H
51	(Japan) Osamu Fukunaga	(Japan) Misako Saida	(Japan) Osamu Fukunaga	Škoda Fabia RS Rally2	Challenger/Masters Driver, Challenger Co-driver	H
52	(Italy) Maurizio Chiarani	(Italy) Flavio Zanella	(Italy) Maurizio Chiarani	Škoda Fabia RS Rally2	Challenger/Masters Driver, Challenger/Masters Co-driver	H
53	(Spain) Juan Carlos Quintana	(Spain) Jonathan Hernández	(Spain) Escudería Maspalomas	Citroën C3 Rally2	Challenger/Masters Driver, Challenger Co-driver	H
54	(Italy) Rachele Somaschini	(Italy) Nicola Arena	(Italy) Rachele Somaschini	Citroën C3 Rally2	Challenger Driver, Challenger Co-driver	H
56	(Mexico) Miguel Granados	(Spain) Marc Martí	(Mexico) Miguel Granados	Škoda Fabia RS Rally2	Challenger/Masters Driver, Challenger/Masters Co-driver	H
57	(United States) Filippo Marchino	(Italy) Pietro Elia Ometto	(United States) Filippo Marchino	Citroën C3 Rally2	Challenger Driver, Challenger Co-driver	H
58	(Republic of Ireland) Eamonn Boland	(Republic of Ireland) Michael Joseph Morrissey	(Republic of Ireland) Eamonn Boland	Ford Fiesta Rally2	Challenger/Masters Driver, Challenger/Masters Co-driver	H

Rally3 entries competing in the WRC3 Championship
No.	Driver	Co-Driver	Entrant	Car	Tyre
59	(France) Arthur Pelamourges	(France) Bastien Pouget	(France) Arthur Pelamourges	Renault Clio Rally3	H
60	(France) Ghjuvanni Rossi	(France) Kylian Sarmezan	(France) Ghjuvanni Rossi	Ford Fiesta Rally3	H
61	(France) Mattéo Chatillon	(France) Maxence Cornuau	(France) Mattéo Chatillon	Renault Clio Rally3	H
62	(Japan) Takumi Matsushita	(Finland) Pekka Kelander	(Japan) Toyota Gazoo Racing WRT NG	Renault Clio Rally3	H
63	(Japan) Shotaro Goto	(Finland) Jussi Lindberg	(Japan) Toyota Gazoo Racing WRT NG	Renault Clio Rally3	H
64	(Bolivia) Nataniel Bruun	(Argentina) Pablo Olmos	(Bolivia) Nataniel Bruun	Ford Fiesta Rally3	H
65	(Poland) Igor Widłak	(Poland) Michał Marczewski	(Poland) Igor Widłak	Ford Fiesta Rally3	H
66	(Spain) Jonás Pérez	(Spain) Damián Sacramento	(Spain) C.D. Todo Sport	Renault Clio Rally3	H

Other major entries
No.	Driver	Co-Driver	Entrant	Car	Tyre
20	(Sweden) Oliver Solberg	(United Kingdom) Elliott Edmondson	(Finland) Printsport	Toyota GR Yaris Rally2	H
41	(Estonia) Robert Virves	(Estonia) Jakko Viilo	(Estonia) Robert Virves	Škoda Fabia RS Rally2	H
43	(Estonia) Georg Linnamäe	(United Kingdom) James Morgan	(Estonia) Georg Linnamäe	Toyota GR Yaris Rally2	H

=== Itinerary ===
All dates and times are WEST (UTC+1).

Date	No.	Time span	Stage name	Distance
24 April	—	After 9:01	Santa Brígida [Shakedown]	6.26 km
24 April		After 21:00	Opening ceremony, Plaza Santa Ana	—N/a
25 April	SS1	After 8:03	Valsequillo – Telde 1	26.32 km
25 April	SS2	After 9:49	Valleseco – Artenara 1	15.27 km
25 April	SS3	After 11:25	La Aldea – Mogán 1	17.83 km
25 April		13:05 – 13:35	Regroup, Estadio Gran Canaria	—N/a
25 April		13:35 – 14:15	Service A, Estadio Gran Canaria	—N/a
25 April	SS4	After 15:18	Valsequillo – Telde 2	26.32 km
25 April	SS5	After 17:04	Valleseco – Artenara 2	15.27 km
25 April	SS6	After 18:40	La Aldea – Mogán 2	17.83 km
25 April		20:30 – 21:15	Flexi service B, Estadio Gran Canaria	—N/a
26 April		7:05 – 7:20	Service C, Estadio Gran Canaria	—N/a
26 April	SS7	After 8:05	Moya – Gáldar 1	24.09 km
26 April	SS8	After 9:48	Arucas – Firgas – Teror 1	13.75 km
26 April	SS9	After 10:58	Tejeda – San Mateo 1	23.30 km
26 April		12:45 – 13:40	Regroup, Estadio Gran Canaria	—N/a
26 April		13:40 – 14:20	Service D, Estadio Gran Canaria	—N/a
26 April	SS10	After 15:05	Moya – Gáldar 2	24.09 km
26 April	SS11	After 16:48	Arucas – Firgas – Teror 2	13.75 km
26 April	SS12	After 17:58	Tejeda – San Mateo 2	23.30 km
26 April		19:45 – 20:30	Regroup, Estadio Gran Canaria	—N/a
26 April	SS13	After 20:35	Las Palmas de Gran Canaria	1.80 km
26 April		20:51 – 21:36	Flexi service E, Estadio Gran Canaria	—N/a
27 April		7:00 – 7:15	Service F, Estadio Gran Canaria	—N/a
27 April	SS14	After 8:10	Agüimes – Santa Lucía 1	14.97 km
27 April	SS15	After 9:05	Maspalomas 1	13.47 km
27 April		9:41 – 10:11	Regroup, Maspalomas Lighthouse	—N/a
27 April	SS16	After 10:35	Costa Canaria	1.50 km
27 April	SS17	After 11:21	Agüimes – Santa Lucía 2	14.97 km
27 April		12:07 – 12:57	Regroup, Hotel Las Tirajanas	—N/a
27 April	SS18	After 13:15	Maspalomas 2 [Power Stage]	13.47 km
27 April		After 13:35	Podium ceremony, Parque del Sur	—N/a

== Report ==
=== WRC Rally1 ===
==== Classification ====
Position		No.	Driver	Co-driver	Entrant	Car	Time	Difference	Points			
Event	Class	No.	Driver	Co-driver	Entrant	Car	Time	Difference	Event	Sunday	Stage	Total
1	1	69	Kalle Rovanperä	Jonne Halttunen	Toyota Gazoo Racing WRT	Toyota GR Yaris Rally1	2:54:39.8	0.0	25	5	5	35
2	2	17	Sébastien Ogier	Vincent Landais	Toyota Gazoo Racing WRT	Toyota GR Yaris Rally1	2:55:33.3	+53.5	17	4	4	25
3	3	33	Elfyn Evans	Scott Martin	Toyota Gazoo Racing WRT	Toyota GR Yaris Rally1	2:55:56.9	+1:17.1	15	3	3	21
4	4	18	Takamoto Katsuta	Aaron Johnston	Toyota Gazoo Racing WRT	Toyota GR Yaris Rally1	2:56:42.7	+2:02.9	12	2	0	14
5	5	16	Adrien Fourmaux	Alexandre Coria	Hyundai Shell Mobis WRT	Hyundai i20 N Rally1	2:57:10.8	+2:31.0	10	1	2	13
6	6	8	Ott Tänak	Martin Järveoja	Hyundai Shell Mobis WRT	Hyundai i20 N Rally1	2:57:52.1	+3:11.4	8	0	0	8
7	7	1	Thierry Neuville	Martijn Wydaeghe	Hyundai Shell Mobis WRT	Hyundai i20 N Rally1	2:58:20.5	+3:40.7	6	0	1	7
11	8	13	Grégoire Munster	Louis Louka	M-Sport Ford WRT	Ford Puma Rally1	3:03:17.0	+8:37.2	0	0	0	0
Retired SS14		55	Josh McErlean	Eoin Treacy	M-Sport Ford WRT	Ford Puma Rally1	Accident		0	0	0	0
Retired SS12		5	Sami Pajari	Marko Salminen	Toyota Gazoo Racing WRT2	Toyota GR Yaris Rally1	Accident		0	0	0	0

==== Special stages ====
Stage	Winners	Car	Time	Class leaders
SD	Rovanperä / Halttunen	Toyota GR Yaris Rally1	4:10.0	—N/a
SS1	Rovanperä / Halttunen	Toyota GR Yaris Rally1	15:43.0	Rovanperä / Halttunen
SS2	Rovanperä / Halttunen	Toyota GR Yaris Rally1	8:59.5	Rovanperä / Halttunen
SS3	Rovanperä / Halttunen	Toyota GR Yaris Rally1	10:39.5	Rovanperä / Halttunen
SS4	Rovanperä / Halttunen	Toyota GR Yaris Rally1	15:39.9	Rovanperä / Halttunen
SS5	Rovanperä / Halttunen	Toyota GR Yaris Rally1	8:55.5	Rovanperä / Halttunen
SS6	Rovanperä / Halttunen	Toyota GR Yaris Rally1	10:34.4	Rovanperä / Halttunen
SS7	Rovanperä / Halttunen	Toyota GR Yaris Rally1	14:29.6	Rovanperä / Halttunen
SS8	Rovanperä / Halttunen	Toyota GR Yaris Rally1	7:46.2	Rovanperä / Halttunen
SS9	Rovanperä / Halttunen	Toyota GR Yaris Rally1	12:57.8	Rovanperä / Halttunen
SS10	Rovanperä / Halttunen	Toyota GR Yaris Rally1	14:23.8	Rovanperä / Halttunen
SS11	Rovanperä / Halttunen	Toyota GR Yaris Rally1	7:41.8	Rovanperä / Halttunen
SS12	Rovanperä / Halttunen	Toyota GR Yaris Rally1	12:52.9	Rovanperä / Halttunen
SS13	Evans / Martin	Toyota GR Yaris Rally1	1:33.3	Rovanperä / Halttunen
SS14	Rovanperä / Halttunen	Toyota GR Yaris Rally1	8:50.1	Rovanperä / Halttunen
SS15	Rovanperä / Halttunen	Toyota GR Yaris Rally1	6:42.7	Rovanperä / Halttunen
SS16	Fourmaux / Coria	Hyundai i20 N Rally1	1:18.4	Rovanperä / Halttunen
SS16	Ogier / Landais	Toyota GR Yaris Rally1	1:18.4	Rovanperä / Halttunen
SS17	Ogier / Landais	Toyota GR Yaris Rally1	8:50.6	Rovanperä / Halttunen
SS18	Rovanperä / Halttunen	Toyota GR Yaris Rally1	6:39.1	Rovanperä / Halttunen

==== Championship standings ====
Drivers' Standings
Move	Pos.	Driver	Points
	1	Elfyn Evans	109
4	2	Kalle Rovanperä	66
1	3	Thierry Neuville	59
	4	Sébastien Ogier	58
2	5	Ott Tänak	57

Co-drivers' Standings
Move	Pos.	Driver	Points
	1	Scott Martin	109
4	2	Jonne Halttunen	66
1	3	Martijn Wydaeghe	59
	4	Vincent Landais	58
2	5	Martin Järveoja	57

Manufacturers' Standings
Move	Pos.	Driver	Points
	1	Toyota Gazoo Racing WRT	208
	2	Hyundai Shell Mobis WRT	157
	3	M-Sport Ford WRT	58
	4	Toyota Gazoo Racing WRT2	25

=== WRC2 Rally2 ===
==== Classification ====
Position		No.	Driver	Co-driver	Entrant	Car	Time	Difference	Points	
Event	Class	No.	Driver	Co-driver	Entrant	Car	Time	Difference	Class	Event
8	1	21	Yohan Rossel	Arnaud Dunand	PH Sport	Citroën C3 Rally2	3:01:50.5	0.0	25	4
9	2	31	Alejandro Cachón	Borja Rozada	Toyota España	Toyota GR Yaris Rally2	3:02:20.0	+29.5	17	2
10	3	28	Nikolay Gryazin	Konstantin Aleksandrov	Toksport WRT	Škoda Fabia RS Rally2	3:01:50.5	+47.7	15	1
12	4	34	Efrén Llarena	Sara Fernández	Efrén Llarena	Citroën C3 Rally2	3:03:54.0	+2:03.5	12	0
13	5	32	Diego Ruiloba	Ángel Vela	Diego Ruiloba	Citroën C3 Rally2	3:04:01.9	+2:11.4	10	0
14	6	29	Emil Lindholm	Reeta Hämäläinen	Toksport WRT	Škoda Fabia RS Rally2	3:04:26.1	+2:35.6	8	0
15	7	24	Roberto Daprà	Luca Guglielmetti	Roberto Daprà	Škoda Fabia RS Rally2	3:04:48.5	+2:58.0	6	0
17	8	23	Jan Černý	Jan Hloušek	Jan Černý	Citroën C3 Rally2	3:07:01.5	+5:11.0	4	0
19	9	35	Diego Dominguez Jr.	Rogelio Peñate	Diego Dominguez Jr.	Toyota GR Yaris Rally2	3:07:42.1	+5:51.6	2	0
20	10	36	Luis Monzón	José Carlos Déniz	Auto-Laca Competición	Citroën C3 Rally2	3:07:56.9	+6:06.4	1	0
21	11	39	Fabio Schwarz	Bernhard Ettel	Fabio Schwarz	Toyota GR Yaris Rally2	3:10:12.8	+8:22.3	0	0
22	12	48	Giovanni Trentin	Alessandro Franco	MT Racing SRL	Škoda Fabia RS Rally2	3:10:44.7	+8:54.2	0	0
23	13	44	Antonio Forné	Axel Coronado	Escudería Costa Brava	Škoda Fabia Rally2 evo	3:14:10.9	+12:20.4	0	0
26	14	53	Juan Carlos Quintana	Jonathan Hernández	Escudería Maspalomas	Citroën C3 Rally2	3:15:39.1	+13:48.6	0	0
30	15	45	Hikaru Kogure	Topi Matias Luhtinen	Toyota Gazoo Racing WRT NG	Toyota GR Yaris Rally2	3:18:23.5	+16:33.0	0	0
31	16	51	Osamu Fukunaga	Misako Saida	Osamu Fukunaga	Škoda Fabia RS Rally2	3:18:46.9	+16:56.4	0	0
32	17	47	Carlos Moreno	Diego Fuentes	Automóvil Club Murcia	Toyota GR Yaris Rally2	3:19:19.1	+17:28.6	0	0
33	18	56	Miguel Granados	Marc Martí	Miguel Granados	Škoda Fabia RS Rally2	3:19:58.8	+18:08.3	0	0
34	19	50	Uğur Soylu	Sener Güray	GP Garage My Team	Škoda Fabia RS Rally2	3:20:55.2	+19:04.7	0	0
35	20	52	Maurizio Chiarani	Flavio Zanella	Maurizio Chiarani	Škoda Fabia RS Rally2	3:20:59.4	+19:08.9	0	0
36	21	54	Rachele Somaschini	Nicola Arena	Rachele Somaschini	Citroën C3 Rally2	3:22:16.3	+20:25.8	0	0
37	22	58	Eamonn Boland	Michael Joseph Morrissey	Eamonn Boland	Ford Fiesta Rally2	3:23:13.5	+21:23.0	0	0
39	23	57	Filippo Marchino	Pietro Elia Ometto	Filippo Marchino	Citroën C3 Rally2	3:25:04.2	+23:13.7	0	0
42	24	49	Juan Carlos Peralta	Victor Peréz	Juan Carlos Peralta	Škoda Fabia RS Rally2	3:27:43.3	+25:52.8	0	0
45	25	46	Roberto Rodríguez	Alba Rodríguez	ACSM Rallye Team	Škoda Fabia RS Rally2	3:31:23.8	+29:33.3	0	0
52	26	42	Philip Allen	Craig Drew	Philip Allen	Škoda Fabia RS Rally2	3:55:25.1	+53:34.6	0	0
53	27	25	Romet Jürgenson	Siim Oja	FIA Rally Star	Ford Fiesta Rally2	4:05:06.6	+1:03:16.1	0	0
Retired SS17		27	Yuki Yamamoto	James Fulton	Toyota Gazoo Racing WRT NG	Toyota GR Yaris Rally2	Withdrawn		0	0
Retired SS12		22	Léo Rossel	Guillaume Mercoiret	PH Sport	Citroën C3 Rally2	Accident		0	0
Retired SS2		30	Mathieu Franceschi	Lucie Baud	Mathieu Franceschi	Toyota GR Yaris Rally2	Mechanical		0	0
Did not start		40	Raúl Hernández	José Murado	Raúl Hernández	Škoda Fabia RS Rally2	Withdrawn		0	0

==== Special stages ====
Overall
Stage	Winners	Car	Time	Class leaders
SD	Gryazin / Aleksandrov	Škoda Fabia RS Rally2	4:20.4	—N/a
SS1	Y. Rossel / Dunand	Citroën C3 Rally2	16:23.9	Y. Rossel / Dunand
SS2	Y. Rossel / Dunand	Citroën C3 Rally2	9:22.5	Y. Rossel / Dunand
SS3	Y. Rossel / Dunand	Citroën C3 Rally2	11:01.4	Y. Rossel / Dunand
SS4	Y. Rossel / Dunand	Citroën C3 Rally2	16:20.7	Y. Rossel / Dunand
SS5	Y. Rossel / Dunand	Citroën C3 Rally2	9:15.7	Y. Rossel / Dunand
SS6	Y. Rossel / Dunand	Citroën C3 Rally2	10:58.3	Y. Rossel / Dunand
SS7	Cachón / Rozada	Toyota GR Yaris Rally2	15:04.1	Y. Rossel / Dunand
SS8	Gryazin / Aleksandrov	Škoda Fabia RS Rally2	8:04.1	Y. Rossel / Dunand
SS9	Cachón / Rozada	Toyota GR Yaris Rally2	13:28.7	Y. Rossel / Dunand
SS10	Y. Rossel / Dunand	Citroën C3 Rally2	14:55.4	Y. Rossel / Dunand
SS11	Y. Rossel / Dunand	Citroën C3 Rally2	8:00.5	Y. Rossel / Dunand
SS12	Y. Rossel / Dunand	Citroën C3 Rally2	13:26.0	Y. Rossel / Dunand
SS13	Gryazin / Aleksandrov	Škoda Fabia RS Rally2	1:33.9	Y. Rossel / Dunand
SS14	Y. Rossel / Dunand	Citroën C3 Rally2	9:10.7	Y. Rossel / Dunand
SS15	Cachón / Rozada	Toyota GR Yaris Rally2	7:03.0	Y. Rossel / Dunand
SS16	Y. Rossel / Dunand	Citroën C3 Rally2	1:18.4	Y. Rossel / Dunand
SS17	Y. Rossel / Dunand	Citroën C3 Rally2	9:11.7	Y. Rossel / Dunand
SS18	Y. Rossel / Dunand	Citroën C3 Rally2	7:02.7	Y. Rossel / Dunand

Challenger
Stage	Winners	Car	Time	Class leaders
SD	Gryazin / Aleksandrov	Škoda Fabia RS Rally2	4:20.4	—N/a
SS1	Cachón / Rozada	Toyota GR Yaris Rally2	16:27.5	Cachón / Rozada
SS2	Gryazin / Aleksandrov	Škoda Fabia RS Rally2	9:27.6	Gryazin / Aleksandrov
SS3	Cachón / Rozada	Toyota GR Yaris Rally2	11:04.6	Cachón / Rozada
SS4	Cachón / Rozada	Toyota GR Yaris Rally2	16:21.4	Cachón / Rozada
SS5	Cachón / Rozada	Toyota GR Yaris Rally2	9:16.8	Cachón / Rozada
SS6	Cachón / Rozada	Toyota GR Yaris Rally2	10:59.4	Cachón / Rozada
SS7	Cachón / Rozada	Toyota GR Yaris Rally2	15:04.1	Cachón / Rozada
SS8	Gryazin / Aleksandrov	Škoda Fabia RS Rally2	8:04.1	Cachón / Rozada
SS9	Cachón / Rozada	Toyota GR Yaris Rally2	13:28.7	Cachón / Rozada
SS10	Cachón / Rozada	Toyota GR Yaris Rally2	14:58.1	Cachón / Rozada
SS11	Cachón / Rozada	Toyota GR Yaris Rally2	8:01.2	Cachón / Rozada
SS12	Gryazin / Aleksandrov	Škoda Fabia RS Rally2	13:26.9	Cachón / Rozada
SS13	Gryazin / Aleksandrov	Škoda Fabia RS Rally2	1:33.9	Cachón / Rozada
SS14	Cachón / Rozada	Toyota GR Yaris Rally2	9:11.6	Cachón / Rozada
SS15	Cachón / Rozada	Toyota GR Yaris Rally2	7:03.0	Cachón / Rozada
SS16	Gryazin / Aleksandrov	Škoda Fabia RS Rally2	1:18.7	Cachón / Rozada
SS17	Gryazin / Aleksandrov	Škoda Fabia RS Rally2	9:12.1	Cachón / Rozada
SS18	Gryazin / Aleksandrov	Škoda Fabia RS Rally2	7:05.3	Cachón / Rozada

==== Championship standings ====
Drivers' Standings
Move	Pos.	Driver	Points
1	1	Yohan Rossel	50
1	2	Oliver Solberg	35
	3	Gus Greensmith	25
	4	Fabrizio Zaldivar	23
	5	Eric Camilli	17

Co-drivers' Standings
Move	Pos.	Driver	Points
1	1	Arnaud Dunand	50
1	2	Elliott Edmondson	35
	3	Jonas Andersson	25
	4	Marcelo Der Ohannesian	23
	5	Thibault de la Haye	17

Manufacturers' Standings
Move	Pos.	Driver	Points
	1	PH Sport	67
	2	Toyota Gazoo Racing WRT NG	54
New entry	3	Toksport WRT	32
1	4	Sarrazin Motorsport – Iron Lynx	27

Challenger Drivers' Standings
Move	Pos.	Driver	Points
	1	Fabrizio Zaldivar	27
	2	Léo Rossel	25
	3	Roope Korhonen	25
	4	Jan Solans	25
New entry	5	Alejandro Cachón	25

Challenger Co-drivers' Standings
Move	Pos.	Driver	Points
	1	Marcelo Der Ohannesian	27
	2	Guillaume Mercoiret	25
	3	Anssi Viinikka	25
	4	Diego Sanjuan de Eusebio	25
New entry	5	Borja Rozada	25

=== WRC3 Rally3 ===
==== Classification ====
Position		No.	Driver	Co-driver	Entrant	Car	Time	Difference	Points
Event	Class	No.	Driver	Co-driver	Entrant	Car	Time	Difference	Points
24	1	61	Mattéo Chatillon	Maxence Cornuau	Mattéo Chatillon	Renault Clio Rally3	3:14:39.9	0.0	25
25	2	59	Arthur Pelamourges	Bastien Pouget	Arthur Pelamourges	Renault Clio Rally3	3:15:08.0	+28.1	17
27	3	60	Ghjuvanni Rossi	Kylian Sarmezan	Ghjuvanni Rossi	Ford Fiesta Rally3	3:16:17.0	+1:37.1	15
28	4	62	Takumi Matsushita	Pekka Kelander	Toyota Gazoo Racing WRT NG	Renault Clio Rally3	3:16:39.3	+1:59.4	12
29	5	63	Shotaro Goto	Jussi Lindberg	Toyota Gazoo Racing WRT NG	Renault Clio Rally3	3:16:40.8	+2:00.9	10
40	6	65	Igor Widłak	Michał Marczewski	Igor Widłak	Ford Fiesta Rally3	3:26:11.8	+11:31.9	8
46	7	66	Jonás Pérez	Damián Sacramento	C.D. Todo Sport	Renault Clio Rally3	3:34:08.0	+19:28.1	6
51	8	64	Nataniel Bruun	Pablo Olmos	Nataniel Bruun	Ford Fiesta Rally3	3:46:47.0	+32:07.1	4

==== Special stages ====
Stage	Winners	Car	Time	Class leaders
SD	Chatillon / Cornuau	Renault Clio Rally3	4:40.6	—N/a
SS1	Rossi / Sarmezan	Renault Clio Rally3	17:28.1	Rossi / Sarmezan
SS2	Rossi / Sarmezan	Renault Clio Rally3	9:49.8	Rossi / Sarmezan
SS3	Chatillon / Cornuau	Renault Clio Rally3	11:42.6	Rossi / Sarmezan
SS4	Pelamourges / Pouget	Renault Clio Rally3	17:18.9	Rossi / Sarmezan
SS5	Chatillon / Cornuau	Renault Clio Rally3	9:57.0	Chatillon / Cornuau
SS6	Pelamourges / Pouget	Renault Clio Rally3	11:45.5	Chatillon / Cornuau
SS7	Stage cancelled			
SS8	Pelamourges / Pouget	Renault Clio Rally3	8:31.8	Chatillon / Cornuau
SS9	Chatillon / Cornuau	Renault Clio Rally3	14:28.0	Chatillon / Cornuau
SS10	Pelamourges / Pouget	Renault Clio Rally3	15:57.4	Chatillon / Cornuau
SS11	Pelamourges / Pouget	Renault Clio Rally3	8:32.6	Chatillon / Cornuau
SS12	Pelamourges / Pouget	Renault Clio Rally3	14:13.8	Chatillon / Cornuau
SS13	Chatillon / Cornuau	Renault Clio Rally3	1:38.1	Chatillon / Cornuau
SS14	Pelamourges / Pouget	Renault Clio Rally3	9:46.1	Chatillon / Cornuau
SS15	Pelamourges / Pouget	Renault Clio Rally3	7:32.9	Chatillon / Cornuau
SS16	Rossi / Sarmezan	Renault Clio Rally3	1:22.3	Chatillon / Cornuau
SS17	Pelamourges / Pouget	Renault Clio Rally3	9:44.2	Chatillon / Cornuau
SS18	Pelamourges / Pouget	Renault Clio Rally3	7:28.3	Chatillon / Cornuau

==== Championship standings ====
Drivers' Standings
Move	Pos.	Driver	Points
1	1	Arthur Pelamourges	42
1	2	Matteo Fontana	34
2	3	Ghjuvanni Rossi	30
11	4	Mattéo Chatillon	29
2	5	Taylor Gill	25

Co-drivers' Standings
Move	Pos.	Driver	Points
1	1	Bastien Pouget	42
1	2	Alessandro Arnaboldi	34
2	3	Kylian Sarmezan	30
11	4	Maxence Cornuau	29
2	5	Daniel Brkic	25

Previous rally: 2025 Safari Rally	2025 FIA World Rally Championship	Next rally: 2025 Rally de Portugal
Previous rally: 2024 Rally Islas Canarias	2025 Rally Islas Canarias	Next rally: 2026 Rally Islas Canarias
