= 2025 Rally Italia Sardegna =

22nd edition of the Rally Italia Sardegna

2025 Rally Italia Sardegna Rally di Sardegna 2025
Round 6 of 14 in the 2025 World Rally Championship
← Previous event	Next event →
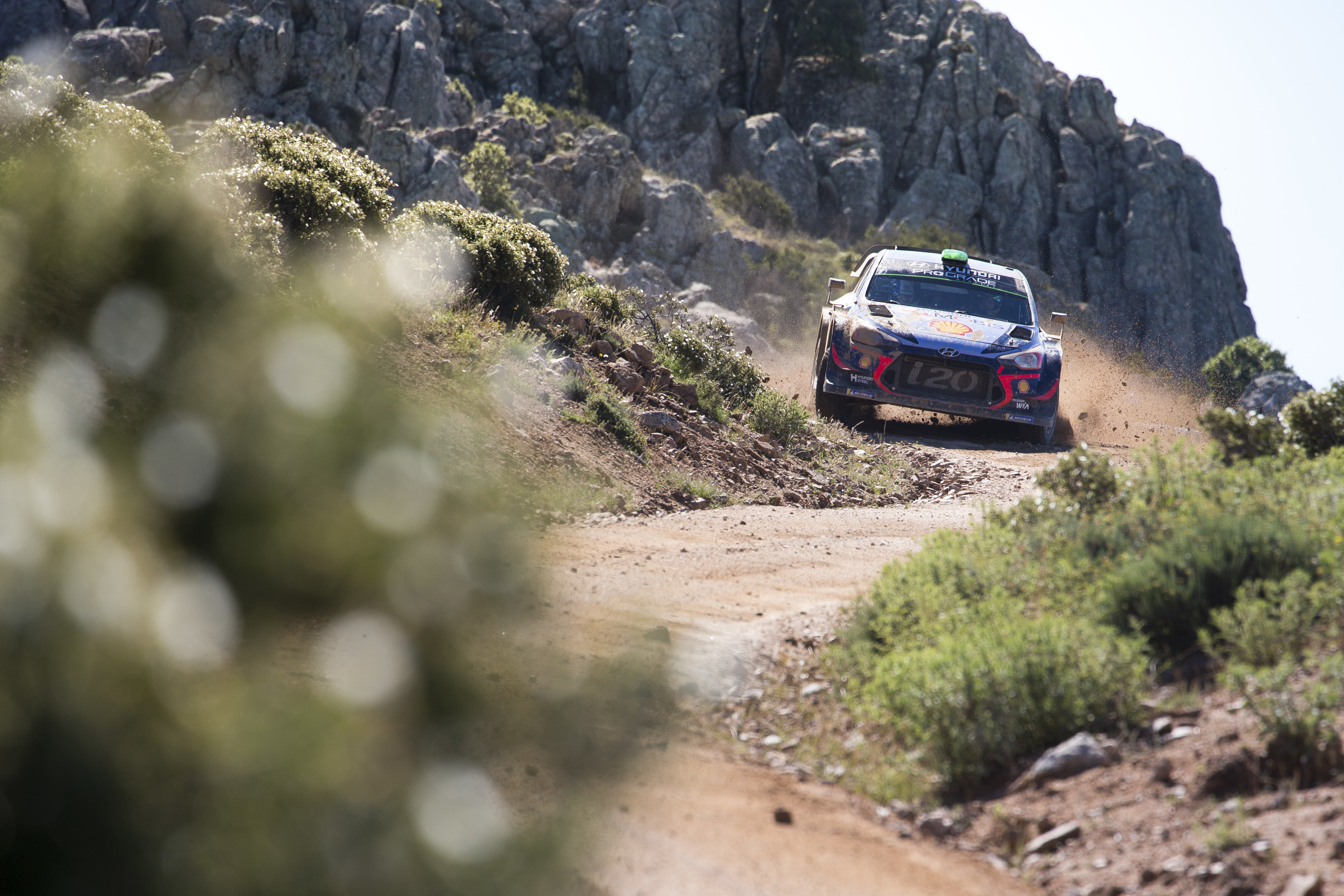
- The Sardinia Rally is known for its fast but narrow roads.
- Host country: Italy
- Rally base: Olbia, Sassari
- Dates run: 5 – 8 June 2025
- Start location: Olbia, Sassari
- Finish location: Olbia, Sassari
- Stages: 16 (320.24 km; 198.99 miles)
- Stage surface: Gravel
- Transport distance: 714.58 km (444.02 miles)
- Overall distance: 1,034.82 km (643.01 miles)

Statistics
- Crews registered: 68
- Crews: 66 at start, 42 at finish

Overall results
- Overall winner: (France) Sébastien Ogier (France) Vincent Landais (Japan) Toyota Gazoo Racing WRT; 3:34:24.5
- Sunday Accumulated leader: (Finland) Kalle Rovanperä (Finland) Jonne Halttunen (Japan) Toyota Gazoo Racing WRT; 1:01:40.6
- Power Stage winner: (Finland) Kalle Rovanperä (Finland) Jonne Halttunen (Japan) Toyota Gazoo Racing WRT; 11:24.1

Support category results
- WRC-2 winner: (Italy) Roberto Daprà (Italy) Luca Guglielmetti; 3:46:39.8
- WRC-3 winner: (Italy) Matteo Fontana (Italy) Alessandro Arnaboldi; 4:03:55.4

The 2025 Rally Italia Sardegna (also known as the Rally di Sardegna 2025) was a motor racing event for rally cars that held over four days from 5 to 8 June 2025. It marked the twenty-second running of the Rally Italia Sardegna, and was the sixth round of the 2025 World Rally Championship, 2025 WRC2 Championship and 2025 WRC3 Championship. The 2025 event was based in Olbia in the Province of Sassari and was contested over sixteen special stages, covering a total competitive distance of 320.24 km (198.99 mi).

Ott Tänak and Martin Järveoja were the defending rally winners, and their team, Hyundai Shell Mobis WRT, were the defending manufacturer's winners. Sami Pajari and Enni Mälkönen were the defending rally winners in the WRC2 category, but they did not defend their titles as they were promoted to the top tier by Toyota. Diego Dominguez Jr. and Rogelio Peñate were the defending rally winners in the WRC3 category.

Sébastien Ogier and Vincent Landais won the rally, and their team, Toyota Gazoo Racing WRT, successfully defended their titles. Roberto Daprà and Luca Guglielmetti were the winners in the WRC2 category. Matteo Fontana and Alessandro Arnaboldi were the winners in the WRC3 category.

== Background ==
=== Entry list ===
The following crews entered into the rally. The event was opened to crews competing in the World Rally Championship, its support categories, the WRC2 Championship, the WRC3 Championship and privateer entries that were not registered to score points in any championship. Twelve entered under Rally1 regulations, as were thirty-four Rally2 crews in the WRC2 Championship and eight Rally3 crew in the WRC3 Championship.

Rally1 entries competing in the World Rally Championship
No.	Driver	Co-Driver	Entrant	Car	Championship eligibility	Tyre
1	(Belgium) Thierry Neuville	(Belgium) Martijn Wydaeghe	(South Korea) Hyundai Shell Mobis WRT	Hyundai i20 N Rally1	Driver, Co-driver, Manufacturer	H
5	(Finland) Sami Pajari	(Finland) Marko Salminen	(Japan) Toyota Gazoo Racing WRT2	Toyota GR Yaris Rally1	Driver, Co-driver, Manufacturer, Team	H
8	(Estonia) Ott Tänak	(Estonia) Martin Järveoja	(South Korea) Hyundai Shell Mobis WRT	Hyundai i20 N Rally1	Driver, Co-driver, Manufacturer	H
9	(Greece) Jourdan Serderidis	(Belgium) Frédéric Miclotte	(United Kingdom) M-Sport Ford WRT	Ford Puma Rally1	Driver, Co-driver	H
13	(Luxembourg) Grégoire Munster	(Belgium) Louis Louka	(United Kingdom) M-Sport Ford WRT	Ford Puma Rally1	Driver, Co-driver, Manufacturer	H
16	(France) Adrien Fourmaux	(France) Alexandre Coria	(South Korea) Hyundai Shell Mobis WRT	Hyundai i20 N Rally1	Driver, Co-driver, Manufacturer	H
17	(France) Sébastien Ogier	(France) Vincent Landais	(Japan) Toyota Gazoo Racing WRT	Toyota GR Yaris Rally1	Driver, Co-driver, Manufacturer	H
18	(Japan) Takamoto Katsuta	(Republic of Ireland) Aaron Johnston	(Japan) Toyota Gazoo Racing WRT	Toyota GR Yaris Rally1	Driver, Co-driver	H
22	(Latvia) Mārtiņš Sesks	(Latvia) Renārs Francis	(United Kingdom) M-Sport Ford WRT	Ford Puma Rally1	Driver, Co-driver	H
33	(United Kingdom) Elfyn Evans	(United Kingdom) Scott Martin	(Japan) Toyota Gazoo Racing WRT	Toyota GR Yaris Rally1	Driver, Co-driver, Manufacturer	H
55	(Republic of Ireland) Josh McErlean	(Republic of Ireland) Eoin Treacy	(United Kingdom) M-Sport Ford WRT	Ford Puma Rally1	Driver, Co-driver, Manufacturer	H
69	(Finland) Kalle Rovanperä	(Finland) Jonne Halttunen	(Japan) Toyota Gazoo Racing WRT	Toyota GR Yaris Rally1	Driver, Co-driver, Manufacturer	H

Rally2 entries competing in the WRC2 Championship
No.	Driver	Co-Driver	Entrant	Car	Championship eligibility	Tyre
20	(France) Yohan Rossel	(France) Arnaud Dunand	(France) PH Sport	Citroën C3 Rally2	Driver, Co-driver, Team	H
23	(Paraguay) Fabrizio Zaldivar	(Italy) Marcelo Der Ohannesian	(Paraguay) Fabrizio Zaldivar	Škoda Fabia RS Rally2	Challenger Driver, Challenger Co-driver	H
24	(Spain) Jan Solans	(Spain) Rodrigo Sanjuan de Eusebio	(Spain) PH.Ph	Toyota GR Yaris Rally2	Driver, Co-driver	H
25	(Spain) Alejandro Cachón	(Spain) Borja Rozada	(Spain) Toyota España	Toyota GR Yaris Rally2	Challenger Driver, Challenger Co-driver	H
26	(Finland) Roope Korhonen	(Finland) Anssi Viinikka	(Finland) Roope Korhonen	Toyota GR Yaris Rally2	Challenger Driver, Challenger Co-driver	H
27	(Italy) Roberto Daprà	(Italy) Luca Guglielmetti	(Italy) Roberto Daprà	Škoda Fabia RS Rally2	Challenger Driver, Challenger Co-driver	H
28	(France) Léo Rossel	(France) Guillaume Mercoiret	(France) PH Sport	Citroën C3 Rally2	Challenger Driver, Challenger Co-driver, Team	H
30	(Finland) Mikko Heikkilä	(Finland) Kristian Temonen	(Finland) Mikko Heikkilä	Škoda Fabia RS Rally2	Challenger Driver, Challenger Co-driver	H
31	(Finland) Lauri Joona	(Finland) Samu Vaaleri	(Finland) Lauri Joona	Škoda Fabia RS Rally2	Challenger Driver, Challenger Co-driver	H
32	(Spain) Diego Ruiloba	(Spain) Ángel Vela	(Spain) Diego Ruiloba	Citroën C3 Rally2	Challenger Driver, Challenger Co-driver	H
34	(Finland) Emil Lindholm	(Finland) Reeta Hämäläinen	(Germany) Toksport WRT	Škoda Fabia RS Rally2	Driver, Co-driver	H
35	(Poland) Kajetan Kajetanowicz	(Poland) Maciej Szczepaniak	(Poland) Kajetan Kajetanowicz	Toyota GR Yaris Rally2	Challenger Driver, Challenger Co-driver	H
36	(France) Pablo Sarrazin	(France) Yannick Roche	(Italy) Sarrazin Motorsport – Iron Lynx	Citroën C3 Rally2	Challenger Driver, Challenger Co-driver, Team	H
37	(Estonia) Romet Jürgenson	(Estonia) Siim Oja	FIA Rally Star	Ford Fiesta Rally2	Challenger Driver, Challenger Co-driver	H
38	(Paraguay) Diego Dominguez Jr.	(Spain) Rogelio Peñate	(Paraguay) Diego Dominguez Jr.	Toyota GR Yaris Rally2	Challenger Driver, Challenger Co-driver	H
40	(France) Sarah Rumeau	(France) Julie Amblard	(Italy) Sarrazin Motorsport – Iron Lynx	Citroën C3 Rally2	Challenger Driver, Challenger Co-driver, Team	H
41	(Czech Republic) Filip Kohn	(United Kingdom) Ross Whittock	(Czech Republic) Filip Kohn	Škoda Fabia RS Rally2	Challenger Driver, Challenger Co-driver	H
42	(Bolivia) Marco Bulacia	(Spain) Diego Vallejo	(Bolivia) Marco Bulacia	Toyota GR Yaris Rally2	Challenger Driver, Challenger Co-driver	H
43	(Czech Republic) Martin Prokop	(Czech Republic) Michal Ernst	(Czech Republic) Martin Prokop	Škoda Fabia RS Rally2	Challenger Driver, Challenger Co-driver	H
44	(Estonia) Robert Virves	(Estonia) Jakko Viilo	(Germany) Toksport WRT	Škoda Fabia RS Rally2	Challenger Driver, Challenger Co-driver	H
45	(France) Pierre-Louis Loubet	(France) Loris Pascaud	(United Kingdom) M-Sport Ford WRT	Ford Fiesta Rally2	Driver, Co-driver	H
46	(Bolivia) Bruno Bulacia	(Brazil) Gabriel Morales	(Bolivia) Bruno Bulacia	Toyota GR Yaris Rally2	Challenger Driver, Challenger Co-driver	H
48	(Italy) Giovanni Trentin	(Italy) Pietro Elia Ometto	(Italy) MT Racing SRL	Škoda Fabia RS Rally2	Challenger Driver, Challenger Co-driver	H
49	(Germany) Fabio Schwarz	(Austria) Bernhard Ettel	(Germany) Fabio Schwarz	Toyota GR Yaris Rally2	Challenger Driver, Challenger Co-driver	H
50	(Italy) Christian Tiramani	(Italy) Fabio Grimaldi	(Italy) Christian Tiramani	Škoda Fabia RS Rally2	Challenger Driver, Challenger Co-driver	H
51	(Qatar) Abdulaziz Al-Kuwari	(Republic of Ireland) Lorcan Moore	(Qatar) Abdulaziz Al-Kuwari	Citroën C3 Rally2	Challenger Driver, Challenger Co-driver	H
52	(Italy) Rachele Somaschini	(Italy) Nicola Arena	(Italy) Rachele Somaschini	Citroën C3 Rally2	Challenger Driver, Challenger Co-driver	H
53	(Italy) Giuseppe Dettori	(Italy) Carlo Pisano	(Italy) Giuseppe Dettori	Škoda Fabia Rally2 evo	Challenger Driver, Challenger Co-driver	H
54	(Turkey) Uğur Soylu	(Turkey) Sener Güray	(Turkey) GP Garage My Team	Škoda Fabia RS Rally2	Challenger/Masters Driver, Challenger Co-driver	H
56	(Mexico) Juan Carlos Peralta	(Mexico) Victor Peréz	(Mexico) Juan Carlos Peralta	Škoda Fabia RS Rally2	Challenger Driver, Challenger Co-driver	H
57	(Italy) Pablo Biolghini	(Italy) Stefano Pudda	(Italy) Pablo Biolghini	Škoda Fabia RS Rally2	Challenger Driver, Challenger Co-driver	H
58	(Mexico) Miguel Granados	(Spain) Marc Martí	(Mexico) Miguel Granados	Škoda Fabia RS Rally2	Challenger/Masters Driver, Challenger/Masters Co-driver	H
59	(Italy) Pierleonardo Bancher	(Italy) Andrea Marcon	(Italy) Pierleonardo Bancher	Škoda Fabia Rally2 evo	Challenger Driver, Challenger Co-driver	H
60	(Italy) Francesco Tali	(Italy) Giulia Cefis	(Italy) Francesco Tali	Ford Fiesta Rally2	Challenger Driver, Challenger Co-driver	H

Rally3 entries competing in the WRC3 Championship
No.	Driver	Co-Driver	Entrant	Car	Tyre
61	(Italy) Matteo Fontana	(Italy) Alessandro Arnaboldi	(Italy) Matteo Fontana	Ford Fiesta Rally3	H
62	(France) Mattéo Chatillon	(France) Maxence Cornuau	(France) Mattéo Chatillon	Renault Clio Rally3	H
63	(Turkey) Kerem Kazaz	(France) Corentin Silvestre	(Turkey) Team Petrol Ofisi	Ford Fiesta Rally3	H
64	(France) Tom Pellerey	(France) Hervé Faucher	(France) Tom Pellerey	Renault Clio Rally3	H
65	(Germany) Timo Weigert	(Germany) Jasmine Weigert	(Germany) Timo Weigert	Renault Clio Rally3	H
66	(Bolivia) Nataniel Bruun	(Argentina) Pablo Olmos	(Bolivia) Nataniel Bruun	Ford Fiesta Rally3	H
67	(Peru) André Martinez	(Argentina) Matias Aranguren	(Peru) André Martinez	Ford Fiesta Rally3	H
68	(Croatia) Slaven Šekuljica	(Slovenia) Viljem Ošlaj	(Croatia) Slaven Šekuljica	Ford Fiesta Rally3	H

Other major entries
No.	Driver	Co-Driver	Entrant	Car	Tyre
21	(Sweden) Oliver Solberg	(United Kingdom) Elliott Edmondson	(Finland) Printsport	Toyota GR Yaris Rally2	H
29	(Bulgaria) Nikolay Gryazin	(Kyrgyzstan) Konstantin Aleksandrov	(Bulgaria) Nikolay Gryazin	Škoda Fabia RS Rally2	H
39	(Japan) Yuki Yamamoto	(Republic of Ireland) James Fulton	(Japan) Toyota Gazoo Racing WRT NG	Toyota GR Yaris Rally2	H
47	(Japan) Hikaru Kogure	(Finland) Topi Matias Luhtinen	(Japan) Toyota Gazoo Racing WRT NG	Toyota GR Yaris Rally2	H

=== Itinerary ===
All dates and times are CEST (UTC+2).

Date	No.	Time span	Stage name	Distance
5 June	—	After 13:01	Olbia Cabu Abbas [Shakedown]	2.19 km
6 June	SS1	After 9:01	Arzachena 1	13.97 km
6 June	SS2	After 10:16	Telti – Calangianus – Berchidda 1	18.43 km
6 June	SS3	After 11:31	Sa Conchedda 1	27.95 km
6 June		13:25 – 14:05	Regroup, Olbia	—N/a
6 June		14:00 – 14:40	Service A, Olbia	—N/a
6 June	SS4	After 15:31	Arzachena 2	13.97 km
6 June	SS5	After 16:46	Telti – Calangianus – Berchidda 2	18.43 km
6 June	SS6	After 18:31	Sa Conchedda 2	27.95 km
6 June		20:05 – 20:50	Flexi service B, Olbia	—N/a
7 June	SS7	After 9:05	Coiluna – Loelle 1	21.18 km
7 June	SS8	After 10:16	Lerno – Su Filigosu 1	24.34 km
7 June	SS9	After 11:31	Tula – Erula 1	15.28 km
7 June		13:00 – 13:20	Regroup, Olbia	—N/a
7 June		13:20 – 14:00	Service C, Olbia	—N/a
7 June	SS10	After 15:05	Coiluna – Loelle 2	21.18 km
7 June	SS11	After 16:16	Lerno – Su Filigosu 2	24.34 km
7 June	SS12	After 17:31	Tula – Erula 2	15.28 km
7 June		19:10 – 20:05	Flexi service D, Olbia	—N/a
8 June	SS13	After 7:25	San Giacomo – Plebi 1	25.19 km
8 June	SS14	After 8:35	Porto San Paolo 1	13.78 km
8 June		9:35 – 9:55	Regroup, Olbia	—N/a
8 June	SS15	After 10:50	San Giacomo – Plebi 2	25.19 km
8 June		11:40 – 12:35	Regroup, Olbia	—N/a
8 June		12:30 – 12:45	Service E, Olbia	—N/a
8 June	SS16	After 13:15	Porto San Paolo 2 [Power Stage]	13.78 km
8 June		After 14:15	Finish, Olbia	—N/a
8 June		After 16:00	Podium ceremony, Olbia	—N/a

== Report ==
=== WRC Rally1 ===
==== Classification ====
Position		No.	Driver	Co-driver	Entrant	Car	Time	Difference	Points			
Event	Class	No.	Driver	Co-driver	Entrant	Car	Time	Difference	Event	Sunday	Stage	Total
1	1	17	Sébastien Ogier	Vincent Landais	Toyota Gazoo Racing WRT	Toyota GR Yaris Rally1	3:34:24.5	0.0	25	3	0	28
2	2	8	Ott Tänak	Martin Järveoja	Hyundai Shell Mobis WRT	Hyundai i20 N Rally1	3:34:32.4	+7.9	17	4	3	27
3	3	69	Kalle Rovanperä	Jonne Halttunen	Toyota Gazoo Racing WRT	Toyota GR Yaris Rally1	3:35:15.0	+50.5	15	5	5	25
4	4	33	Elfyn Evans	Scott Martin	Toyota Gazoo Racing WRT	Toyota GR Yaris Rally1	3:39:30.2	+5:50.7	12	2	1	15
5	5	18	Takamoto Katsuta	Aaron Johnston	Toyota Gazoo Racing WRT	Toyota GR Yaris Rally1	3:41:54.1	+7:29.6	10	0	2	12
7	6	5	Sami Pajari	Marko Salminen	Toyota Gazoo Racing WRT2	Toyota GR Yaris Rally1	3:44:53.5	+10:29.0	6	0	0	6
19	7	1	Thierry Neuville	Martijn Wydaeghe	Hyundai Shell Mobis WRT	Hyundai i20 N Rally1	3:57:15.5	+22:51.0	0	1	4	5
20	8	16	Adrien Fourmaux	Alexandre Coria	Hyundai Shell Mobis WRT	Hyundai i20 N Rally1	4:01:18.8	+26:54.3	0	0	0	0
25	9	9	Jourdan Serderidis	Frédéric Miclotte	M-Sport Ford WRT	Ford Puma Rally1	4:17:30.7	+28:54.8	0	0	0	0
32	10	13	Grégoire Munster	Louis Louka	M-Sport Ford WRT	Ford Puma Rally1	4:06:25.9	+32:01.4	0	0	0	0
34	11	55	Josh McErlean	Eoin Treacy	M-Sport Ford WRT	Ford Puma Rally1	4:23:59.8	+49:35.3	0	0	0	0
Retired SS2		22	Mārtiņš Sesks	Renārs Francis	M-Sport Ford WRT	Ford Puma Rally1	Rolled		0	0	0	0

==== Special stages ====
Stage	Winners	Car	Time	Class leaders
SD	Ogier / Landais	Toyota GR Yaris Rally1	1:43.1	—N/a
SS1	Ogier / Landais	Toyota GR Yaris Rally1	7:50.0	Ogier / Landais
SS2	Tänak / Järveoja	Hyundai i20 N Rally1	10:23.9	Neuville / Wydaeghe
SS3	Fourmaux / Coria	Hyundai i20 N Rally1	17:16.4	Fourmaux / Coria
SS4	Tänak / Järveoja	Hyundai i20 N Rally1	7:40.3	Neuville / Wydaeghe
SS5	Rovanperä / Halttunen	Toyota GR Yaris Rally1	10:10.0	Fourmaux / Coria
SS6	Ogier / Landais	Toyota GR Yaris Rally1	16:51.8	Ogier / Landais
SS7	Ogier / Landais	Toyota GR Yaris Rally1	13:37.5	Ogier / Landais
SS8	Tänak / Järveoja	Hyundai i20 N Rally1	15:25.4	Ogier / Landais
SS9	Ogier / Landais	Toyota GR Yaris Rally1	12:09.7	Ogier / Landais
SS10	Tänak / Järveoja	Hyundai i20 N Rally1	13:29.9	Ogier / Landais
SS11	Tänak / Järveoja	Hyundai i20 N Rally1	15:15.9	Ogier / Landais
SS12	Ogier / Landais	Toyota GR Yaris Rally1	11:56.6	Ogier / Landais
SS13	Ogier / Landais	Toyota GR Yaris Rally1	19:10.6	Ogier / Landais
SS14	Rovanperä / Halttunen	Toyota GR Yaris Rally1	11:58.7	Ogier / Landais
SS15	Tänak / Järveoja	Hyundai i20 N Rally1	18:50.8	Ogier / Landais
SS16	Rovanperä / Halttunen	Toyota GR Yaris Rally1	11:24.1	Ogier / Landais

==== Championship standings ====
Drivers' Standings
Move	Pos.	Driver	Points
	1	Elfyn Evans	133
1	2	Sébastien Ogier	114
1	3	Kalle Rovanperä	113
	4	Ott Tänak	108
	5	Thierry Neuville	83

Co-drivers' Standings
Move	Pos.	Driver	Points
	1	Scott Martin	133
1	2	Vincent Landais	114
1	3	Jonne Halttunen	113
	4	Martin Järveoja	108
	5	Martijn Wydaeghe	83

Manufacturers' Standings
Move	Pos.	Driver	Points
	1	Toyota Gazoo Racing WRT	312
	2	Hyundai Shell Mobis WRT	243
	3	M-Sport Ford WRT	87
	4	Toyota Gazoo Racing WRT2	48

=== WRC2 Rally2 ===
==== Classification ====
Position		No.	Driver	Co-driver	Entrant	Car	Time	Difference	Points	
Event	Class	No.	Driver	Co-driver	Entrant	Car	Time	Difference	Class	Event
9	1	27	Roberto Daprà	Luca Guglielmetti	Roberto Daprà	Škoda Fabia RS Rally2	3:46:39.8	0.0	25	2
10	2	35	Kajetan Kajetanowicz	Maciej Szczepaniak	Kajetan Kajetanowicz	Toyota GR Yaris Rally2	3:46:45.6	+5.8	17	1
11	3	43	Martin Prokop	Michal Ernst	Martin Prokop	Škoda Fabia RS Rally2	3:46:50.7	+10.9	15	0
12	4	24	Jan Solans	Rodrigo Sanjuan de Eusebio	PH.Ph	Toyota GR Yaris Rally2	3:47:25.1	+45.3	12	0
13	5	37	Romet Jürgenson	Siim Oja	FIA Rally Star	Ford Fiesta Rally2	3:47:33.3	+53.5	10	0
14	6	31	Lauri Joona	Samu Vaaleri	Lauri Joona	Škoda Fabia RS Rally2	3:47:38.3	+58.5	8	0
15	7	44	Robert Virves	Jakko Viilo	Toksport WRT	Škoda Fabia RS Rally2	3:48:27.7	+1:47.9	6	0
16	8	36	Pablo Sarrazin	Yannick Roche	Sarrazin Motorsport – Iron Lynx	Citroën C3 Rally2	3:51:08.4	+4:28.6	4	0
18	9	48	Giovanni Trentin	Pietro Elia Ometto	MT Racing SRL	Škoda Fabia RS Rally2	3:54:23.7	+7:43.9	2	0
21	10	38	Diego Dominguez Jr.	Rogelio Peñate	Diego Dominguez Jr.	Toyota GR Yaris Rally2	4:02:39.8	+16:00.0	1	0
23	11	53	Giuseppe Dettori	Carlo Pisano	Giuseppe Dettori	Škoda Fabia Rally2 evo	4:04:01.5	+17:21.7	0	0
26	12	58	Miguel Granados	Marc Martí	Miguel Granados	Škoda Fabia RS Rally2	4:08:02.6	+21:22.8	0	0
27	13	51	Abdulaziz Al-Kuwari	Lorcan Moore	Abdulaziz Al-Kuwari	Citroën C3 Rally2	4:08:05.7	+21:59.9	0	0
28	14	25	Alejandro Cachón	Borja Rozada	Toyota España	Toyota GR Yaris Rally2	4:16:44.4	+30:04.6	0	0
30	15	50	Christian Tiramani	Fabio Grimaldi	Christian Tiramani	Škoda Fabia RS Rally2	4:21:53.3	+35:13.5	0	0
31	16	52	Rachele Somaschini	Nicola Arena	Rachele Somaschini	Citroën C3 Rally2	4:22:46.9	+36:07.1	0	0
33	17	20	Yohan Rossel	Arnaud Dunand	PH Sport	Citroën C3 Rally2	4:25:20.3	+38:40.5	0	0
36	18	26	Roope Korhonen	Anssi Viinikka	Roope Korhonen	Toyota GR Yaris Rally2	4:34:54.6	+48:14.8	0	0
38	19	59	Pierleonardo Bancher	Andrea Marcon	Pierleonardo Bancher	Škoda Fabia Rally2 evo	4:42:25.8	+55:46.0	0	0
39	20	54	Uğur Soylu	Sener Güray	GP Garage My Team	Škoda Fabia RS Rally2	4:47:47.0	+1:01:07.2	0	0
41	21	56	Juan Carlos Peralta	Victor Peréz	Juan Carlos Peralta	Škoda Fabia RS Rally2	5:33:59.2	+1:47:19.4	0	0
Retired SS16		42	Marco Bulacia	Diego Vallejo	Marco Bulacia	Toyota GR Yaris Rally2	Technical		0	0
Retired SS15		40	Sarah Rumeau	Julie Amblard	Sarrazin Motorsport – Iron Lynx	Citroën C3 Rally2	Withdrawn		0	0
Retired SS14		34	Emil Lindholm	Reeta Hämäläinen	Toksport WRT	Škoda Fabia RS Rally2	Off-road		0	0
Retired SS14		46	Bruno Bulacia	Gabriel Morales	Bruno Bulacia	Toyota GR Yaris Rally2	Accident		0	0
Retired SS12		49	Fabio Schwarz	Bernhard Ettel	Fabio Schwarz	Toyota GR Yaris Rally2	Engine		0	0
Retired SS11		28	Léo Rossel	Guillaume Mercoiret	PH Sport	Citroën C3 Rally2	Water hose		0	0
Retired SS8		57	Pablo Biolghini	Stefano Pudda	Pablo Biolghini	Škoda Fabia RS Rally2	Engine		0	0
Retired SS8		60	Francesco Tali	Giulia Cefis	Francesco Tali	Ford Fiesta Rally2	Gearbox		0	0
Retired SS6		23	Fabrizio Zaldivar	Marcelo Der Ohannesian	Fabrizio Zaldivar	Škoda Fabia RS Rally2	Accident		0	0
Retired SS6		32	Diego Ruiloba	Ángel Vela	Diego Ruiloba	Citroën C3 Rally2	Withdrawn		0	0
Retired SS2		30	Mikko Heikkilä	Kristian Temonen	Mikko Heikkilä	Škoda Fabia RS Rally2	Accident		0	0
Did not start		45	Pierre-Louis Loubet	Loris Pascaud	M-Sport Ford WRT	Ford Fiesta Rally2	Withdrawn		0	0

==== Special stages ====
Overall
Stage	Winners	Car	Time	Class leaders
SD	Daprà / Guglielmetti	Škoda Fabia RS Rally2	1:48.1	—N/a
SS1	Lindholm / Hämäläinen	Škoda Fabia RS Rally2	8:08.1	Lindholm / Hämäläinen
SS2	Cachón / Rozada	Toyota GR Yaris Rally2	10:51.2	Y. Rossel / Dunand
SS3	Lindholm / Hämäläinen	Škoda Fabia RS Rally2	17:53.1	Lindholm / Hämäläinen
SS4	Lindholm / Hämäläinen	Škoda Fabia RS Rally2	7:56.1	Lindholm / Hämäläinen
SS5	Y. Rossel / Dunand	Citroën C3 Rally2	10:34.5	Lindholm / Hämäläinen
SS6	Lindholm / Hämäläinen	Škoda Fabia RS Rally2	17:33.9	Lindholm / Hämäläinen
SS7	Lindholm / Hämäläinen	Škoda Fabia RS Rally2	14:14.8	Lindholm / Hämäläinen
SS8	Lindholm / Hämäläinen	Škoda Fabia RS Rally2	16:13.8	Lindholm / Hämäläinen
SS9	Korhonen / Viinikka	Toyota GR Yaris Rally2	12:36.1	Lindholm / Hämäläinen
SS10	Solans / Sanjuan de Eusebio	Toyota GR Yaris Rally2	14:02.4	Lindholm / Hämäläinen
SS11	Solans / Sanjuan de Eusebio	Toyota GR Yaris Rally2	16:00.1	Lindholm / Hämäläinen
SS12	Korhonen / Viinikka	Toyota GR Yaris Rally2	12:27.9	Lindholm / Hämäläinen
SS13	Y. Rossel / Dunand	Citroën C3 Rally2	19:53.5	Lindholm / Hämäläinen
SS14	Korhonen / Viinikka	Toyota GR Yaris Rally2	12:17.9	Joona / Vaaleri
SS15	Korhonen / Viinikka	Toyota GR Yaris Rally2	19:48.8	Daprà / Guglielmetti
SS16	Korhonen / Viinikka	Toyota GR Yaris Rally2	11:57.9	Daprà / Guglielmetti

Challenger
Stage	Winners	Car	Time	Class leaders
SD	Daprà / Guglielmetti	Škoda Fabia RS Rally2	1:48.1	—N/a
SS1	Joona / Vaaleri	Škoda Fabia RS Rally2	8:08.9	Joona / Vaaleri
SS2	Cachón / Rozada	Toyota GR Yaris Rally2	10:51.2	Cachón / Rozada
SS3	Prokop / Ernst	Škoda Fabia RS Rally2	17:59.9	Prokop / Ernst
SS4	Joona / Vaaleri	Škoda Fabia RS Rally2	8:01.8	Joona / Vaaleri
SS5	Solans / Sanjuan de Eusebio	Toyota GR Yaris Rally2	10:42.4	Joona / Vaaleri
SS6	Prokop / Ernst	Škoda Fabia RS Rally2	17:41.6	Prokop / Ernst
SS7	Solans / Sanjuan de Eusebio	Toyota GR Yaris Rally2	14:15.8	Joona / Vaaleri
SS8	Solans / Sanjuan de Eusebio	Toyota GR Yaris Rally2	16:14.0	Prokop / Ernst
SS9	Korhonen / Viinikka	Toyota GR Yaris Rally2	12:36.1	Joona / Vaaleri
SS10	Solans / Sanjuan de Eusebio	Toyota GR Yaris Rally2	14:02.4	Joona / Vaaleri
SS11	Solans / Sanjuan de Eusebio	Toyota GR Yaris Rally2	16:00.1	Joona / Vaaleri
SS12	Korhonen / Viinikka	Toyota GR Yaris Rally2	12:27.9	Joona / Vaaleri
SS13	Korhonen / Viinikka	Toyota GR Yaris Rally2	19:58.2	Joona / Vaaleri
SS14	Korhonen / Viinikka	Toyota GR Yaris Rally2	12:17.9	Joona / Vaaleri
SS15	Korhonen / Viinikka	Toyota GR Yaris Rally2	3:34:33.0	Daprà / Guglielmetti
SS16	Korhonen / Viinikka	Toyota GR Yaris Rally2	11:57.9	Daprà / Guglielmetti

==== Championship standings ====
Drivers' Standings
Move	Pos.	Driver	Points
	1	Yohan Rossel	67
	2	Oliver Solberg	60
3	3	Roberto Daprà	49
1	4	Gus Greensmith	40
	5	Jan Solans	39

Co-drivers' Standings
Move	Pos.	Driver	Points
	1	Arnaud Dunand	67
	2	Elliott Edmondson	60
7	3	Luca Guglielmetti	41
1	4	Jonas Andersson	40
1	5	Rodrigo Sanjuan de Eusebio	39

Manufacturers' Standings
Move	Pos.	Driver	Points
	1	PH Sport	126
	2	Toyota Gazoo Racing WRT NG	79
	3	Sarrazin Motorsport – Iron Lynx	64
	4	Toksport WRT	32

Challenger Drivers' Standings
Move	Pos.	Driver	Points
2	1	Roberto Daprà	65
	2	Jan Solans	54
2	3	Roope Korhonen	50
5	4	Kajetan Kajetanowicz	37
1	5	Fabrizio Zaldivar	31

Challenger Co-drivers' Standings
Move	Pos.	Driver	Points
1	1	Diego Sanjuan de Eusebio	54
1	2	Anssi Viinikka	50
4	3	Luca Guglielmetti	50
4	4	Maciej Szczepaniak	37
2	5	Marcelo Der Ohannesian	31

=== WRC3 Rally3 ===
==== Classification ====
Position		No.	Driver	Co-driver	Entrant	Car	Time	Difference	Points
Event	Class	No.	Driver	Co-driver	Entrant	Car	Time	Difference	Points
22	1	61	Matteo Fontana	Alessandro Arnaboldi	Matteo Fontana	Ford Fiesta Rally3	4:03:55.4	0.0	25
24	2	66	Nataniel Bruun	Pablo Olmos	Nataniel Bruun	Ford Fiesta Rally3	4:04:19.9	+24.5	17
29	3	67	André Martinez	Matias Aranguren	André Martinez	Ford Fiesta Rally3	4:21:21.4	+17:26.0	15
35	4	65	Timo Weigert	Jasmine Weigert	Timo Weigert	Renault Clio Rally3	4:34:00.4	+30:05.0	12
37	5	63	Kerem Kazaz	Corentin Silvestre	Team Petrol Ofisi	Ford Fiesta Rally3	4:35:27.8	+31:32.4	10
Retired SS15		62	Mattéo Chatillon	Maxence Cornuau	Mattéo Chatillon	Renault Clio Rally3	Withdrawn		0
Retired SS12		64	Tom Pellerey	Hervé Faucher	Tom Pellerey	Renault Clio Rally3	Shock absorber		0
Retired SS2		68	Slaven Šekuljica	Viljem Ošlaj	Slaven Šekuljica	Ford Fiesta Rally3	Mechanical		0

==== Special stages ====
Stage	Winners	Car	Time	Class leaders
SD	Chatillon / Cornuau	Renault Clio Rally3	1:54.4	—N/a
SS1	Pellerey / Faucher	Renault Clio Rally3	8:44.0	Pellerey / Faucher
SS2	Fontana / Arnaboldi	Ford Fiesta Rally3	11:34.9	Fontana / Arnaboldi
SS3	Fontana / Arnaboldi	Ford Fiesta Rally3	18:57.0	Fontana / Arnaboldi
SS4	Fontana / Arnaboldi	Ford Fiesta Rally3	8:36.1	Fontana / Arnaboldi
SS5	Chatillon / Cornuau	Renault Clio Rally3	11:29.0	Fontana / Arnaboldi
SS6	Fontana / Arnaboldi	Ford Fiesta Rally3	18:45.4	Fontana / Arnaboldi
SS7	Bruun / Olmos	Ford Fiesta Rally3	15:18.8	Fontana / Arnaboldi
SS8	Pellerey / Faucher	Renault Clio Rally3	17:33.1	Fontana / Arnaboldi
SS8	Bruun / Olmos	Ford Fiesta Rally3	17:33.1	Fontana / Arnaboldi
SS9	Fontana / Arnaboldi	Ford Fiesta Rally3	13:23.0	Fontana / Arnaboldi
SS10	Bruun / Olmos	Ford Fiesta Rally3	15:10.4	Fontana / Arnaboldi
SS11	Fontana / Arnaboldi	Ford Fiesta Rally3	17:17.4	Fontana / Arnaboldi
SS12	Fontana / Arnaboldi	Ford Fiesta Rally3	13:47.3	Fontana / Arnaboldi
SS13	Chatillon / Cornuau	Renault Clio Rally3	21:28.6	Fontana / Arnaboldi
SS14	Fontana / Arnaboldi	Ford Fiesta Rally3	13:10.7	Fontana / Arnaboldi
SS15	Bruun / Olmos	Ford Fiesta Rally3	21:34.9	Fontana / Arnaboldi
SS16	Bruun / Olmos	Ford Fiesta Rally3	13:11.7	Fontana / Arnaboldi

==== Championship standings ====
Drivers' Standings
Move	Pos.	Driver	Points
3	1	Matteo Fontana	59
1	2	Taylor Gill	50
1	3	Arthur Pelamourges	42
3	4	Kerem Kazaz	37
2	5	Ghjuvanni Rossi	36

Co-drivers' Standings
Move	Pos.	Driver	Points
3	1	Alessandro Arnaboldi	59
1	2	Daniel Brkic	50
1	3	Bastien Pouget	42
3	4	Corentin Silvestre	37
2	5	Kylian Sarmezan	36

Previous rally: 2025 Rally de Portugal	2025 FIA World Rally Championship	Next rally: 2025 Acropolis Rally
Previous rally: 2024 Rally Italia Sardegna	2025 Rally Italia Sardegna	Next rally: 2026 Rally Italia Sardegna
