= Fabrizio Zaldivar =

Paraguayan rally driver

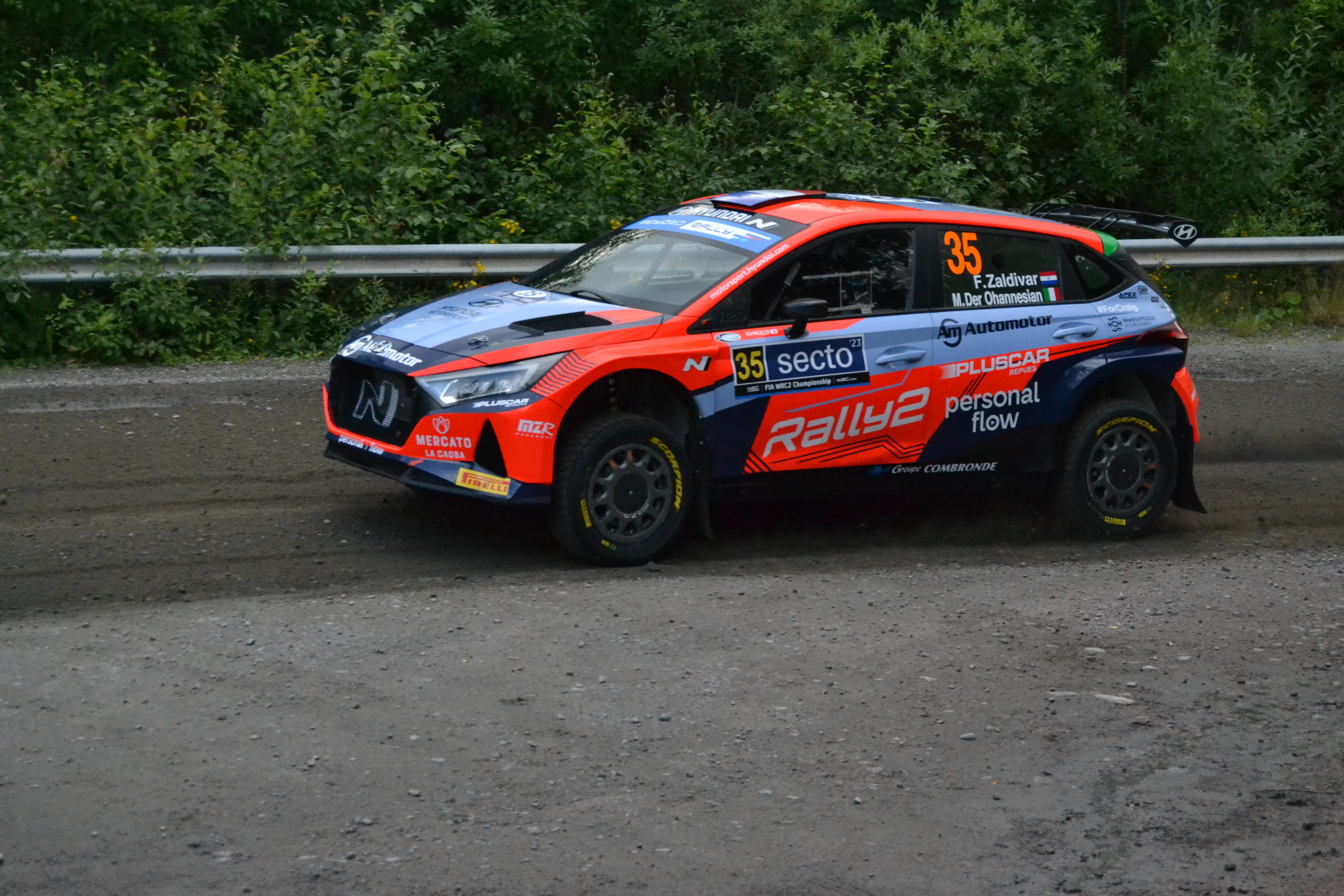

Personal information
- Nationality: (Paraguay) Paraguayan
- Born: 8 February 2001 (age 25)

World Rally Championship record
- Years active: 2019–present
- Co-driver: Marcelo Der Ohanessian
- Rallies: 47
- Championships: 0
- Rally wins: 0
- Podiums: 0
- Stage wins: 0
- Total points: 11
- First rally: 2019 Rally Sweden
- Last rally: 2026 Rally del Paraguay
- Last updated on: 12 April 2026.

Fabrizio Zaldivar (born 8 February 2001) is a rally driver from Paraguay.

== Career ==
Zaldivar started rallying in 2016, entering several events around Paraguay. He made his WRC debut in 2019 by contesting the Junior WRC and managed to finish 8th overall. He remained in the series in 2020, and switched to WRC-3 in 2021.

In 2022, Zaldivar joined Hyundai Motorsport to compete in the WRC-2 series, alongside Teemu Suninen. He scored his first WRC point at the 2022 Rally Japan by finishing fifth in the Power Stage.

For the 2023 season, Zaldivar remained with the team, which would be run by 2C Competition.

Zaldivar recorded his first career top ten finish at the 2024 Acropolis Rally, by completing eighth overall.

== Results ==
=== WRC results ===
Year	Entrant	Car	1	2	3	4	5	6	7	8	9	10	11	12	13	14	WDC	Points
2019	Fabrizio Zaldivar	Ford Fiesta R2T19	MON	SWE; 41	MEX	FRA; 41	ARG	CHL	POR	ITA; 28	FIN; 41	GER	TUR	GBR; 32	ESP; 33	AUS; C	NC	0
2020	Fabrizio Zaldivar	Ford Fiesta R2T19	MON	SWE; 31	MEX	EST; 37	TUR	ITA; 27	MNZ; 33								NC	0
2021	Fabrizio Zaldivar	Škoda Fabia Rally2 evo	MON	ARC; 33	CRO; 17	POR; 18	ITA; 11	KEN	EST; 20	BEL	GRE; 33	FIN	ESP; 23	MNZ			NC	0
2022	Hyundai Motorsport N	Hyundai i20 N Rally2	MON	SWE	CRO	POR; 31	ITA; 33	KEN	EST; 20	FIN; 15	BEL	GRE; 11	NZL	ESP; 18	JPN; 25		38th	1
2023	Hyundai Motorsport N	Hyundai i20 N Rally2	MON	SWE; 31	MEX	CRO	POR; Ret	ITA; 24	KEN	EST; 32	FIN; Ret	GRE	CHL; 14	EUR; 19	JPN		NC	0
2024	Fabrizio Zaldivar	Škoda Fabia RS Rally2	MON	SWE; 40	KEN	CRO	POR; 11	ITA; 42	POL	LAT; 15	FIN; 50	GRE; 8	CHL; 13	EUR	JPN		32nd	1
2025	Toksport WRT	Škoda Fabia RS Rally2	MON	SWE; 14			POR; 22	ITA; Ret	GRE; 29	EST; 19	FIN						19th	3
2025	Fabrizio Zaldivar	Škoda Fabia RS Rally2			KEN; 9	ESP						PAR; 10	CHL; 13	EUR	JPN	SAU	19th	3
2026	Fabrizio Zaldivar	Škoda Fabia RS Rally2	MON	SWE	KEN; 7	CRO	ESP; 28	POR; 15	JPN	GRE	EST; 26	FIN; Ret	PAR; 15	CHL; Ret	ITA; Ret	SAU; C	22nd	6

* Season still in progress.

=== WRC-2 results ===
Year	Entrant	Car	1	2	3	4	5	6	7	8	9	10	11	12	13	14	WDC	Points
2022	Hyundai Motorsport N	Hyundai i20 N Rally2	MON	SWE	CRO	POR; 14	ITA; 22	KEN	EST; 9	FIN; 7	BEL	GRE; 5	NZL	ESP; 8	JPN; 14		17th	23
2023	Hyundai Motorsport N	Hyundai i20 N Rally2	MON	SWE; 15	MEX	CRO	POR; Ret	ITA; 16	KEN	EST; 14	FIN; Ret	GRE	CHL; 8	EUR; 9	JPN		37th	6
2024	Fabrizio Zaldivar	Škoda Fabia RS Rally2	MON	SWE; 17	KEN	CRO	POR; 4	ITA; 21	POL	LAT; 4	FIN; 19	GRE; 5	CHL; 6	EUR	JPN		11th	42
2025	Toksport WRT	Škoda Fabia RS Rally2	MON	SWE; 6			POR; 12	ITA; Ret	GRE; 16	EST	FIN						11th	45
2025	Fabrizio Zaldivar	Škoda Fabia RS Rally2			KEN; 3	ESP						PAR; 4	CHL; 5	EUR	JPN	SAU	11th	45
2026	Fabrizio Zaldivar	Škoda Fabia RS Rally2	MON	SWE	KEN; 3	CRO	ESP	POR; 5	JPN	GRE	EST; 13	FIN; Ret	PAR; 9	CHL; Ret	ITA; Ret	SAU; C	16th	27

* Season still in progress.

=== WRC-2 Junior results ===
Year	Entrant	Car	1	2	3	4	5	6	7	8	9	10	11	12	13	WDC	Points
2022	Hyundai Motorsport N	Hyundai i20 N Rally2	MON	SWE	CRO	POR; 3	ITA; 9	KEN	EST; 4	FIN; 4	BEL	GRE; 3	NZL	ESP; 4	JPN; 5	4th	76

=== WRC-3 results ===
Year	Entrant	Car	1	2	3	4	5	6	7	8	9	10	11	12	WDC	Points
2021	Fabrizio Zaldivar	Škoda Fabia Rally2 evo	MCO	ARC; 13	CRO; 6	POR; 6	ITA; 4	KEN	EST; 7	BEL	GRE; 9	FIN	ESP; 6	MNZ	8th	47

=== JWRC results ===
Year	Entrant	Car	1	2	3	4	5	WDC	Points
2019	Fabrizio Zaldivar	Ford Fiesta R2T19	SWE; 9	FRA; 10	ITA; 7	FIN; 8	GBR; 5	8th	32
2020	Fabrizio Zaldivar	Ford Fiesta Rally4	SWE; 6	EST; 6	ITA; 2	MNZ; 2		4th	53
