= Lucas Simões =

Brazilian artist based in São Paulo

Lucas Simões (Catanduva, 1980) is a Brazilian artist based in São Paulo.

His works explores the limits and unpredictability of behavior of materials and spans acts of research and art. Concrete, paper, steel, foam, the most recurrent materials in Simões’ work, originated in his background as architect as does his approach to the artistic process. Part of his work can be seen as a critique of modern architecture.

== Career ==
His artistic career began before the architecture’s studies and always coexisted until becoming his definitive path.

Some of his works are permanently exhibited in public Brazilian collections such as the Museu de Arte do Rio, Rio de Janeiro, the MAC USP, (Museu de Arte Contemporânea da cidade de São Paulo), the ITAÚ collection of Brazilian photography, São Paulo, the CCSP (Centro Cultural São Paulo), São Paulo, and the IFF (Instituto Figueiredo Ferraz), Ribeirão Preto and some foreign collections, such as the Blanton Museum of Art in Austin, USA and the Kablanc Otazu Foundation in Navarra, Spain.

Simões' work has been displayed in solo exhibits at Museu de Arte Moderna Aloísio Magalhães in Recife, Brazil, at Caixa Cultural, both in São Paulo and Rio de Janeiro and at Pivô Arte e Pesquisa in São Paulo.

He took part kin various collective exhibitions; amongst them “Mil Bestias que Rugen: Dispositivos de exposición para una modernidad crítica”, at Centro Andaluz de Arte Contemporanea (CAAC) in Sevilla, Spain, “Building Materials” at Hauser & Wirth Gallery, in Los Angeles and “Acervo: Outras Abordagens” at Museu de Arte Contempoânea da USP (MAC USP), in São Paulo, all during 2017.

In 2013 his work was part of the show “Amor e ódio à Lygia Clark” at the Zacheta National Gallery in Warsaw, Poland and of “Além da biblioteca” at Itocho Ayoama Art Square in Tokyo, Japan.

In 2012 he took part in “Elogie Du vertige” at Maison Européenne de la Photographie in Paris, France and the year before to “Geração 00, a nova fotografia brasileira” at Sesc Belenzinho in São Paulo, Brazil.

He participated in the 10th Bienal do Mercosul “Mensagens de Uma Nova América” in Porto Alegre, Brazil in 2015 and “Imagine Brazil” in 2013, at Astrup Fearnley Museet in Oslo, Norway and in 2015 at D H C/ART Foundation for Contemporary Art in Quebec, Canada.
