= Juan Carlos Peralta =

Chilean footballer (born 1968)

Personal information
- Full name: Juan Carlos Peralta Moretti
- Date of birth: February 4, 1968 (age 58)
- Place of birth: Santiago, Chile
- Height: 1.85 m (6 ft 1 in)
- Position: Defender

Youth career
- 1979–1987: Colo-Colo

Senior career*
Years	Team	Apps	(Gls)
1988–1991	Colo Colo	37	(0)
1988	→ Colchagua (loan)		
1992	Deportes Concepción	7	(0)
1993	Magallanes		
1993	Deportes Antofagasta	23	(0)
1994	Deportes Melipilla	25	(1)
1995	Magallanes	–	(–)
1996–1997	Unión Santa Cruz	50	(4)
- * Club domestic league appearances and goals

Juan Carlos Peralta Moretti (born February 4, 1968) is a Chilean former professional footballer who played as a defender.

== Playing career ==
His father took him to Colo-Colo's school in 1979, and he stayed there for over nine years. His idols were always Leonel Herrera and Lizardo Garrido. He shared a locker room with the latter. In 1988, he was loaned to Colchagua.

He returned to Colo-Colo in 1989. In 1991, he was part of the extraordinary team that won the Copa Libertadores, playing 12 matches and spending 829 minutes on the field.

After his unforgettable year, despite being considered by coach Mirko Jozić, he asked to leave due to the number of reinforcements that arrived at the team. So, he went on loan to Deportes Concepción in 1992. Later, he played for clubs like Deportes Antofagasta, Magallanes, and Unión Santa Cruz. In the latter, he was relegated to the Third Division in 1997.

== Coaching career ==
Peralta leads a football academy based in Pedro Aguirre Cerda commune, Santiago de Chile.

== Personal life ==
His father was a renowned Chilean boxing coach.

== Honours ==
Colo Colo

- Chilean Primera División: 1989, 1990, 1991
- Copa Chile: 1989, 1990
- Copa Libertadores: 1991

Magallanes

- Tercera División de Chile: 1995
