= Armindo Araújo =

Portuguese rally driver (born 1977)

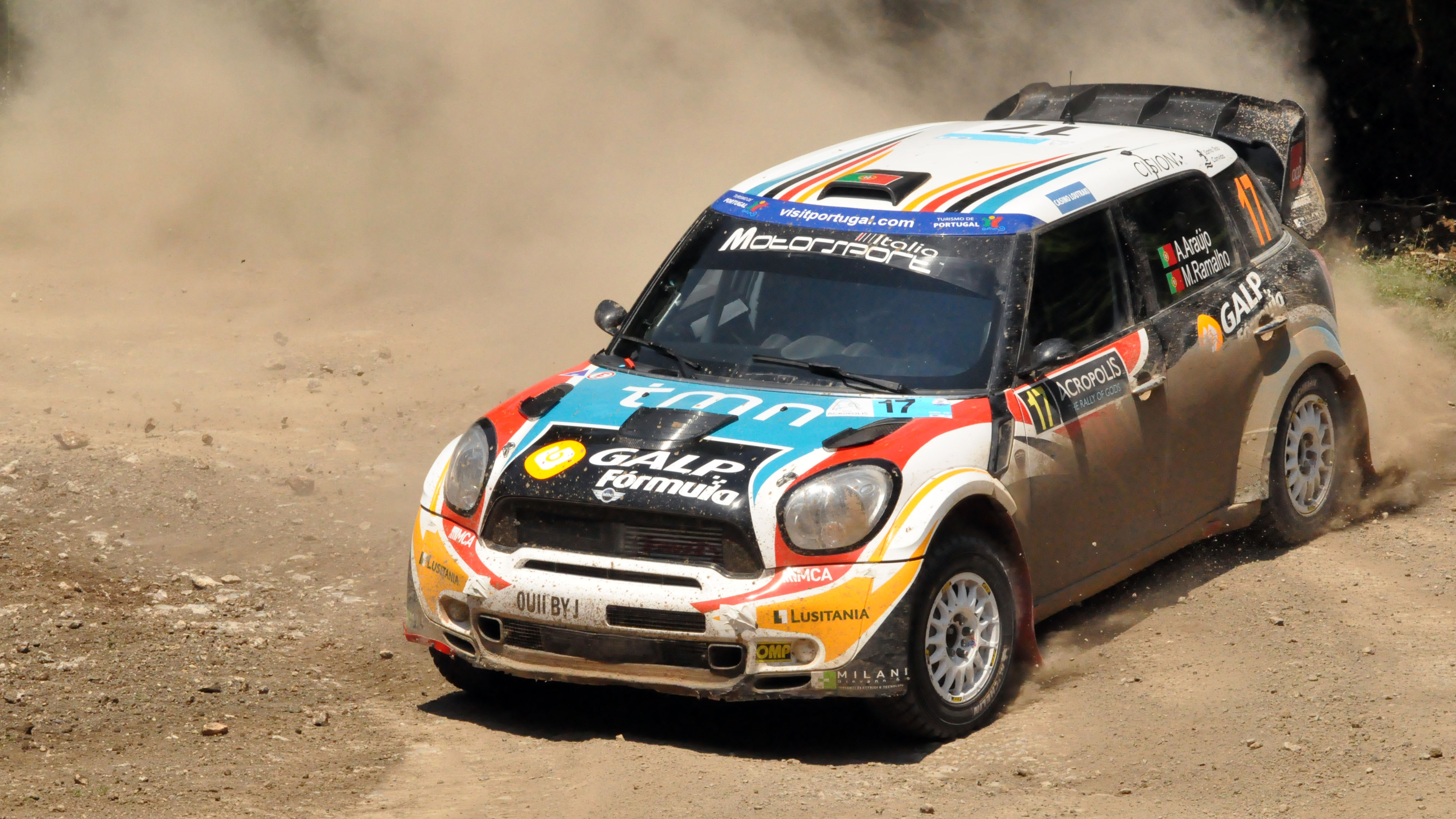
- Araújo and his Mini John Cooper Works WRC

Personal information
- Nationality: (Portugal) Portuguese
- Born: 1 September 1977 (age 49)

World Rally Championship record
- Years active: 2001, 2007–2012, 2018–2019, 2021-present
- Co-driver: (Portugal) Miguel Ramalho (Portugal) Luís Ramalho
- Teams: Ralliart Italy, Mini Portugal
- Rallies: 48
- Championships: 0
- Rally wins: 0
- Podiums: 0
- Stage wins: 1
- Total points: 17
- First rally: 2001 Rallye de Portugal
- Last rally: 2024 Rally de Portugal

Armindo Araújo (born 1 September 1977) is a Portuguese rally driver. He won the Production World Rally Championship in the 2009 season, repeating the accomplishment in the next year (2010 season), to become the first pilot to ever win this cup twice in a row since its creation back in 2002.

== Career ==
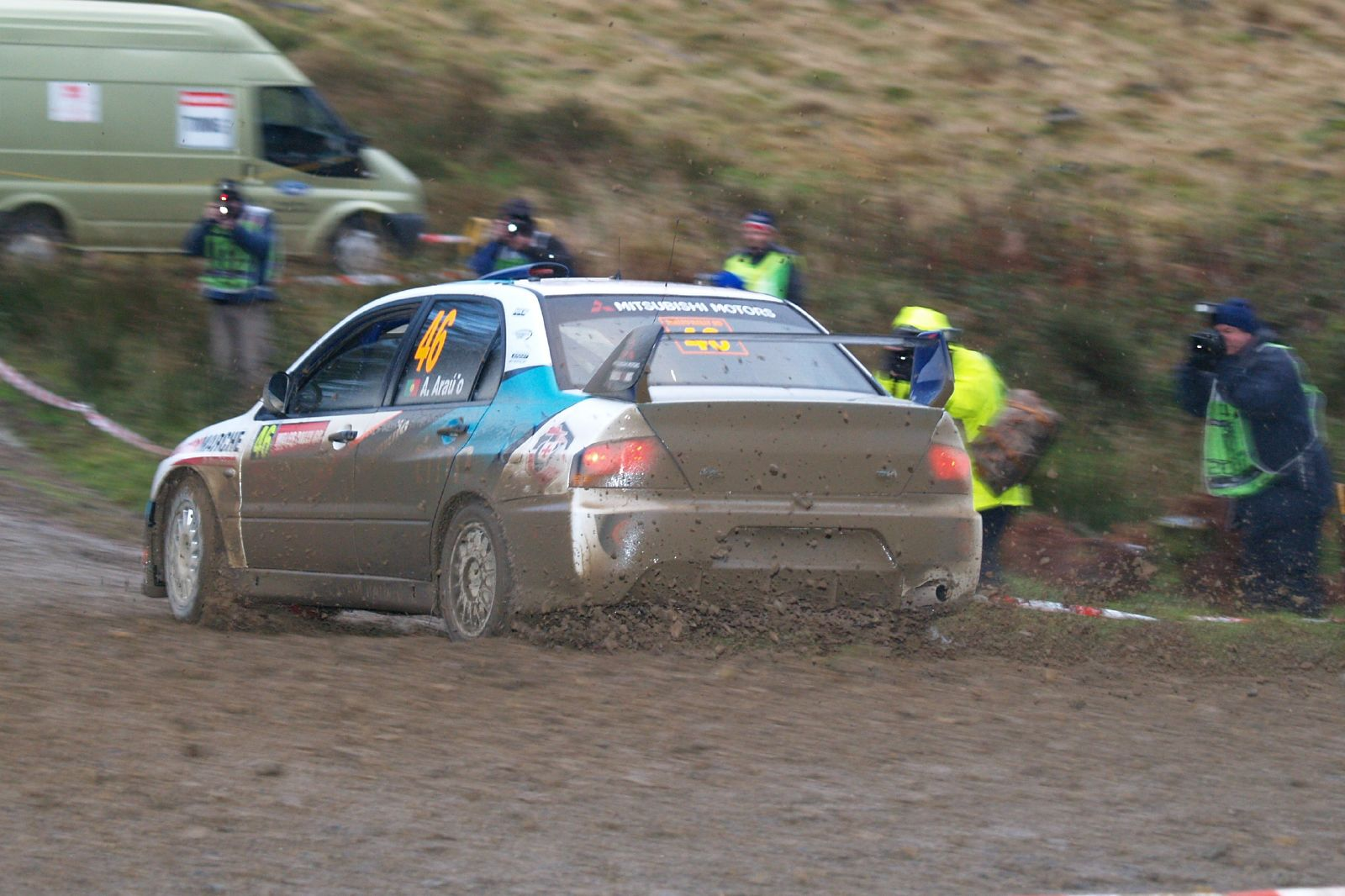
Araújo during the 2007 Rally GB.

Araújo began rallying in 2000, having raced motorcycles since 1994. Between 2000 and 2004, he used a Citroën Saxo on Portuguese national events, winning the National Championship in 2003 and 2004, before winning the title again in 2005 and 2006 using a Group N Mitsubishi Lancer Evolution VIII.

In 2007, Araújo began competing in the Production World Rally Championship (P-WRC), finishing 14th in the standings. In 2008, he finished eighth in the P-WRC standings. In 2009, he won the P-WRC class on Rally de Portugal, and two other podium finishes led to him winning the P-WRC. Araujo was co-driven by Miguel Ramalho in all events across 2001-2008.

Araújo returned to rallying in 2018, competing in the Portuguese championship. He has won the championship in his returning season of 2018, driving a Hyundai i20 R5 prepared by Hyundai Team Portugal. He switched to a Škoda Fabia Rally2 evo, prepared by The Racing Factory, in 2020 to grab another title that year. As of right now, Araújo leads the 2022 European Rally Championship as the first two rounds took place in Portugal. Since his return, Araújo is co-driven by Luis Ramalho - brother of his former co-driver.

== WRC results ==
Year	Entrant	Car	1	2	3	4	5	6	7	8	9	10	11	12	13	14	15	16	WDC	Points
2001	Armindo Araújo	Citroën Saxo	MON	SWE	POR; Ret	ESP	ARG	CYP	GRE	KEN	FIN	NZL	ITA	FRA	AUS	GBR			NC	0
2007	Mitsubishi Motors de Portugal	Mitsubishi Lancer Evolution IX	MON	SWE; 20	NOR	MEX		ARG	ITA	GRE; Ret	FIN	GER	NZL; 18	ESP	FRA	JPN; EX	IRE	GBR; 23	NC	0
2007	Mitsubishi Motors de Portugal	Mitsubishi Lancer WRC 05					POR; Ret												NC	0
2008	Ralliart Italy	Mitsubishi Lancer Evolution IX	MON	SWE; 17	MEX	ARG	JOR	ITA	GRE; 16	TUR; 16	FIN	GER	NZL; 25	ESP	FRA	JPN; 21	GBR; 27		NC	0
2009	Ralliart Italy	Mitsubishi Lancer Evolution IX	IRE	NOR; 16	CYP; 10	POR; 9	ARG	ITA; 14	GRE; 9	POL	FIN								NC	0
2009	Errani Team Group	Mitsubishi Lancer Evolution IX										AUS; 13							NC	0
2009	Ralliart Italy	Mitsubishi Lancer Evolution X											ESP	GBR; 9					NC	0
2010	Ralliart Italy	Mitsubishi Lancer Evolution X	SWE; 23		JOR; 12	TUR	NZL	POR; 14	BUL	FIN	GER; 18	JPN	FRA; 16	ESP	GBR; 18				25th	1
2010	Ralliart Italy	Mitsubishi Lancer Evolution IX		MEX; 10															25th	1
2011	Motorsport Italia/BAMP	Mini John Cooper Works S2000	SWE	MEX	POR; Ret														23rd	5
2011	Motorsport Italia/BAMP	Mini John Cooper Works WRC				JOR	ITA; 12	ARG	GRE; Ret	FIN; 20	GER; 8	AUS	FRA; Ret	ESP; Ret	GBR; 10				23rd	5
2012	Armindo Araújo World Rally Team	Mini John Cooper Works WRC	MON; 10																15th	11
2012	WRC Team Mini Portugal	Mini John Cooper Works WRC		SWE; 15	MEX; 7	POR; 15	ARG; Ret	GRE; 11	NZL; 8	FIN; 15	GER	GBR	FRA	ITA	ESP				15th	11
2018	Team Hyundai Portugal	Hyundai i20 R5	MON	SWE	MEX	FRA	ARG	POR; 14	ITA	FIN	GER	TUR	GBR	ESP	AUS				NC	0
2019	Team Hyundai Portugal	Hyundai i20 R5	MON	SWE	MEX	FRA	ARG	CHL	POR; 16	ITA	FIN	GER	TUR	GBR	ESP	AUS; C			NC	0
2021	Armindo Araújo	Škoda Fabia R5 Evo	MON	ARC	CRO	POR; 19	ITA	KEN	EST	BEL	GRE	FIN	ESP	MNZ					NC	0
2022	Armindo Araújo	Škoda Fabia Rally2 evo	MON	SWE	CRO	POR; 14	ITA	KEN	EST	FIN	BEL	GRE	NZL	ESP	JPN				NC	0
2023	Armindo Araújo	Škoda Fabia Rally2 evo	MON	SWE	MEX	CRO	POR; 17	ITA	KEN	EST	FIN	GRE	CHL	EUR	JPN				NC	0
2024	The Racing Factory	Škoda Fabia RS Rally2	MON	SWE	KEN	CRO	POR; 17	ITA	POL	LAT	FIN	GRE	CHL	EUR	JPN				NC	0

* Season still in progress.

=== PWRC results ===
Year	Entrant	Car	1	2	3	4	5	6	7	8	9	Pos.	Points
2007	Mitsubishi Motors de Portugal	Mitsubishi Lancer Evo IX	SWE; 4	MEX	ARG	GRE; Ret	NZL; 6	JPN; EX	IRE	GBR; 7		14th	10
2008	Ralliart Italy	Mitsubishi Lancer Evo IX	SWE; 7	ARG	GRE; 3	TUR; 5	FIN	NZL; 12	JPN; 9	GBR; 7		8th	14
2009	Ralliart Italy	Mitsubishi Lancer Evo IX	NOR; 4	CYP; 2	POR; 1	ARG	ITA; 3	GRE; 2				1st	42
2009	Errani Team Group	Mitsubishi Lancer Evo IX							AUS; 4	GBR		1st	42
2010	Ralliart Italy	Mitsubishi Lancer Evolution X	SWE; 3		JOR; 2	NZL	FIN	GER; 1	JPN	FRA; 1	GBR; 2	1st	126
2010	Ralliart Italy	Mitsubishi Lancer Evolution IX		MEX; 1								1st	126

=== WRC-2 results ===
Year	Entrant	Car	1	2	3	4	5	6	7	8	9	10	11	12	13	14	Pos.	Points
2019	Team Hyundai Portugal	Hyundai i20 R5	MON	SWE	MEX	FRA	ARG	CHL	POR; 8	ITA	FIN	GER	TUR	GBR	ESP	AUS; C	42nd	4
2022	Armindo Araújo	Škoda Fabia Rally2 evo	MON	SWE	CRO	POR; 5	ITA	KEN	EST	FIN	BEL	GRE	NZL	ESP	JPN		34th	10
2023	Armindo Araújo	Škoda Fabia Rally2 evo	MON	SWE	MEX	CRO	POR; 12	ITA	KEN	EST	FIN	GRE	CHL	EUR	JPN		NC	0
2024	The Racing Factory	Škoda Fabia RS Rally2	MON	SWE	KEN	CRO	POR; 10	ITA	POL	LAT	FIN	GRE	CHL	EUR	JPN		53rd	1

* Season still in progress.
