= Daniel Barritt =

British rally co-driver (born 1980)

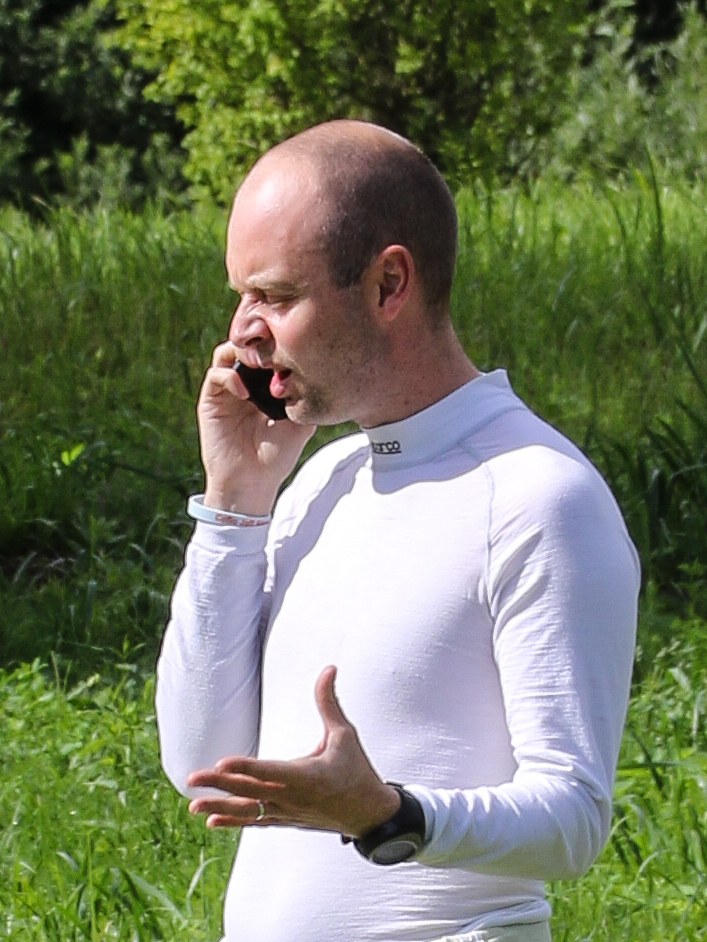
- Barritt at the 2016 Rally Estonia

Personal information
- Nationality: (United Kingdom) British
- Born: 23 August 1980 (age 46); Burnley, Lancashire, England

World Rally Championship record
- Years active: 2000, 2002, 2004–2021
- Driver: (United Kingdom) David Bateson (United Kingdom) David Higgins (United Kingdom) Mark Higgins (Japan) Fumio Nutahara (United Kingdom) Phillip Morrow (Zimbabwe) Conrad Rautenbach (Japan) Toshihiro Arai (United Kingdom) Alastair Fisher (United Kingdom) Elfyn Evans (Japan) Takamoto Katsuta
- Teams: M-Sport World Rally Team; Citroën Junior Team; Toyota Gazoo Racing WRT
- Rallies: 137
- Championships: 0
- Rally wins: 1
- Podiums: 8
- Stage wins: 39
- First rally: 2000 Rally of Great Britain
- First win: 2017 Wales Rally GB
- Last win: 2017 Wales Rally GB
- Last rally: 2021 Rally Estonia

Daniel Barritt (born 23 August 1980) is a British World Rally Championship co-driver from England.

== Background ==
Barritt was born in Burnley, UK. His family has been involved in rallying for three generations. His grandfather, for example, was a navigator (in the 1950s) and his dad adopted the same activity two decades later, at which point Barritt started going along with his dad. This piqued his interest from a very young age. He thinks he saw his very first rally from his bassinet.

== Early co-driving ==
Barritt believes that his hometown, Burnley, played a part in his sporting career, given the number of famous stock car and bike racers who hail from the area. The town also has motorsport clubs which help those interested get into the sport and for sure assisted Barritt when he first started out.

== Going pro ==
When Barritt was 16, he co-drove for his dad in Scotland on the Tour of Mull Rally. From then on he was hooked. In 2000 in England, he drove in his first rally. He turned pro in 2002. From 2006, Barritt became a regular co-driver in the WRC (World Rally Championship), marking the start of his three-year partnership with Fumio Nutahara, a PWRC driver.

In 2009, Barritt and Conrad Rautenbach competed in the World Rally Championship. In 2010, he switched back to PWRC with Toshi Arai. In 2011 and 2012, he navigated for Alastair Fisher, a WRC Academy front-runner. He then joined Elfyn Evans at the time that Evans started making his mark in 2013, and also co-driving with him as part of the M-Sport World Rally Team in 2014.

== Career highlights ==
One highlight occurred in 2002 when David Higgins approached him and asked if he would co-drive for him in the British and US championships. At the US international rally three days later, he was part of the winning team. Another highlight was the 2008 Tour of Mull rally that he won with his friend Paul Mackinnon.

Year	Event
2017	Returned as co-driver to Elfyn Evans. Lost win in Argentina by 0.7 of a second, got another second place in Finland and took first WRC win on Wales Rally GB.
2016	Finnish Rally Championship
2015	Picked up first podium finish with third in Argentina, finished second in Corsica after leading most of the rally.
2014	First full season in a WRC car for the M-Sport team. Fourth overall in Mexico and Germany, fifth overall in Italy and winner of the Power Stage on the ADAC Rally Deutschland.
2013	Winner, WRC2 on Wales Rally GB. 2nd in WRC2 in Germany and France. 6th overall in Germany (WRC2) and Sardinia (WRC)
2011/12	WRC academy and selected WRC events with Alastair Fisher
2010	PWRC and selected events with Toshi Arai
2009	Full WRC championship with Conrad Rautenbach and Citroen Junior Team
2008	PWRC with Nutahara, Middle East championship 3rd, BRC
2007	PWRC with Fumio Nutahara plus BRC
2006	PWRC with Fumio Nutahara, 2nd in championship with 3 wins. BRC Phillip Morrow
2005	BRC
2004	BRC and China National Championship
2002/3	SCCA American champions with David Higgins
1997–2001	Local and national rallies
1996	1st Rally Tour of Mull

== WRC victories ==
#	Event	Season	Co-driver	Car
1	(United Kingdom) 73. Dayinsure Wales Rally GB 2017	2017	(United Kingdom) Elfyn Evans	Ford Fiesta WRC

== Results ==
=== WRC results ===
Year	Entrant	Car	1	2	3	4	5	6	7	8	9	10	11	12	13	14	15	16	Pos.	Points
2000	David Bateson	Volkswagen Polo 16V	MON	SWE	KEN	POR	ESP	ARG	GRE	NZL	FIN	CYP	FRA	ITA	AUS	GBR; Ret			NC	0
2002	David Higgins	Subaru Impreza WRC '99	MON	SWE	FRA	ESP	CYP	ARG	GRE	KEN	FIN	GER	ITA	NZL	AUS	GBR; Ret			NC	0
2004	Mark Higgins	Subaru Impreza STi	MON	SWE	MEX	NZL	CYP	GRE	TUR	ARG	FIN	GER	JPN	GBR	ITA	FRA	ESP	AUS; Ret	NC	0
2005	David Higgins	Opel Corsa S1600	MON	SWE	MEX	NZL	ITA	CYP	TUR; 31	GRE	ARG	FIN	GER						NC	0
2005	David Higgins	Mitsubishi Lancer Evo VII												GBR; 24	JPN	FRA	ESP		NC	0
2005	Mark Higgins	Subaru Impreza STi																AUS; 10	NC	0
2006	Advan-Piaa Rally Team	Mitsubishi Lancer Evo IX	MON; 17	SWE	MEX; EX	ESP	FRA	ARG	ITA	GRE	GER	FIN	JPN; 8	CYP; 11	TUR	AUS; 26	NZL; 21		29th	1
2006	Phillip Morrow	Mitsubishi Lancer Evo IX																GBR; 51	29th	1
2007	Advan-Piaa Rally Team	Mitsubishi Lancer Evo IX	MON	SWE; 22	NOR; 18	MEX	POR	ARG; Ret	ITA	GRE	FIN	GER	NZL; 17	ESP	FRA	JPN; Ret	IRE; 21	GBR	NC	0
2008	Advan-Piaa Rally Team	Mitsubishi Lancer Evo IX	MON	SWE	MEX	ARG; 11	JOR	ITA	GRE; 17	TUR	FIN; 23	GER	NZL; Ret	ESP	FRA	JPN; 18	GBR; Ret		NC	0
2009	Citroën Junior Team	Citroën C4 WRC	IRE; 18	NOR; Ret	CYP; 6	POR; Ret	ARG; Ret	ITA; Ret	GRE; 5	POL; 8	FIN; Ret	AUS; Ret	ESP; 11	GBR; 8					10th	9
2010	Subaru Team Arai	Subaru Impreza STi N15	SWE	MEX; 11	JOR	TUR	NZL; 26	POR	BUL	FIN	GER; 34	JPN; Ret	FRA; 23	ESP	GBR; 30				NC	0
2011	Alastair Fisher	Ford Fiesta R2	SWE	MEX	POR; NC	JOR	ITA; Ret	ARG	GRE	FIN; Ret	GER; NC	AUS	FRA; NC	ESP	GBR; NC				NC	0
2012	Alastair Fisher	Ford Fiesta R2	MON	SWE	MEX	POR; NC	ARG	GRE; NC	NZL	FIN; NC	GER; Ret		FRA; Ret	ITA					NC	0
2012	Alastair Fisher	Ford Fiesta S2000										GBR; 23							NC	0
2012	Proton Motorsports	Proton Satria Neo S2000													ESP; 17				NC	0
2013	Qatar M-Sport WRT	Ford Fiesta RRC	MON	SWE	MEX	POR; 23	ARG	GRE											12th	20
2013	Qatar M-Sport WRT	Ford Fiesta RS WRC							ITA; 6										12th	20
2013	Qatar M-Sport WRT	Ford Fiesta R5								FIN; Ret	GER; 6	AUS	FRA; 11	ESP; Ret	GBR; 8				12th	20
2014	M-Sport WRT	Ford Fiesta RS WRC	MON; 6	SWE; Ret	MEX; 4	POR; 22	ARG; 7	ITA; 5	POL; 35	FIN; 7	GER; 4	AUS; 8	FRA; 6	ESP; 14	GBR; 5				8th	81
2015	M-Sport WRT	Ford Fiesta RS WRC	MON; 7	SWE; 6	MEX; 4	ARG; 3	POR; 64	ITA; 4	POL; Ret	FIN; 12	GER; 6	AUS; 9	FRA; 2	ESP; 34	GBR; 6				7th	89
2016	M-Sport WRT	Ford Fiesta R5	MON; 8	SWE; 9	MEX	ARG; 17	POR; 30	ITA	POL; 13	FIN; 11	GER	CHN; C	FRA; 11	ESP	GBR; WD	AUS			21st	6
2017	M-Sport WRT	Ford Fiesta WRC	MON; 6	SWE; 6	MEX; 9	FRA; 21	ARG; 2	POR; 6	ITA; Ret	POL; 8	FIN; 2	GER; 6	ESP; 7	GBR; 1	AUS; 5				5th	128
2018	M-Sport Ford WRT	Ford Fiesta WRC	MON; 6	SWE; 14	MEX; Ret	FRA; 5	ARG; 6	POR; 2	ITA; 14	FIN; 7	GER; 25	TUR; 12	GBR; 20	ESP; 3	AUS; 6				7th	80
2019	Tommi Mäkinen Racing	Ford Fiesta R5	MON; 13	SWE; Ret	MEX	FRA; 14	ARG; 16	CHL; 14	POR; 21	ITA; Ret									25th	1
2019	Tommi Mäkinen Racing	Ford Fiesta R5 Mk. II									FIN; Ret		TUR	GBR; 14		AUS; C			25th	1
2019	Tommi Mäkinen Racing	Toyota Yaris WRC										GER; 10			ESP; 39				25th	1
2020	Toyota Gazoo Racing WRT	Toyota Yaris WRC	MON; 7	SWE; 9	MEX	EST; Ret	TUR	ITA; Ret	MNZ; 20										13th	13
2021	Toyota Gazoo Racing WRT	Toyota Yaris WRC	MON; 6	ARC; 6	CRO; 6	POR; 4	ITA; 4	KEN; 2	EST; Ret	BEL	GRE	FIN	ESP	MNZ					7th	66

* Season still in progress.
