= Carlos del Barrio =

Spanish rally co-driver (born 1968)

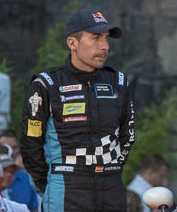
- Carlos del Barrio in 2012

Personal information
- Nationality: Spain
- Full name: Carlos del Barrio Corral
- Born: August 15, 1968 (age 58)

World Rally Championship record
- Years active: 1991–1992, 1994–2000, 2002, 2004–2007, 2010–2014, 2018–2022
- Driver: (Spain) Jaime Azcona (Spain) "Capi Saiz" (Spain) Jesús Puras (Spain) Salvador Cañellas Jr. (Spain) Dani Sordo (Mexico) Ricardo Triviňo (Spain) Xavier Pons (Spain) Daniel Solà (Jordan) Mazen Tantash (Lebanon) Nicolas Amiouni (Paraguay) Fabrizio Zaldívar (Bolivia) Bruno Bulacia
- Teams: Hyundai Motorsport; Mini WRC Team; Citroën World Rally Team; CUPRA; OMV Rally Team
- Rallies: 106
- Championships: 0
- Rally wins: 3
- Podiums: 13
- Stage wins: 76
- First rally: 1991 Rally Catalunya
- First win: 2013 Rallye Deutschland
- Last win: 2020 Rally Italia Sardegna
- Last rally: 2022 Rally Catalunya

Carlos del Barrio Corral (born 15 August 1968) is a Spanish rally co-driver. He is currently teamed with Dani Sordo and is competing for Hyundai in the World Rally Championship.

== Rally career ==
Del Barrio began his rally career in 1991, co-driving for several drivers.

In 2011, del Barrio formed a partnership with Dani Sordo in Mini WRC Team.

In 2013 Rallye Deutschland, del Barrio and Sordo won their first WRC victory, 53 seconds over Thierry Neuville.

Del Barrio ended his partnership with Sordo after 2013, but resumed in 2018. They now drive for Hyundai Motorsport.

== Victories ==
=== WRC victories ===
#	Event	Season	Driver	Car
1	(Germany) 31. ADAC Rallye Deutschland	2013	(Spain) Dani Sordo	Citroën DS3 WRC
2	(Italy) 16° Rally Italia Sardegna	2019	(Spain) Dani Sordo	Hyundai i20 Coupe WRC
3	(Italy) 17º Rally Italia Sardegna	2020	(Spain) Dani Sordo	Hyundai i20 Coupe WRC

== Results ==
=== WRC results ===
Year	Entrant	Car	1	2	3	4	5	6	7	8	9	10	11	12	13	14	15	16	WDC	Points
1991	Escudería Purroy	Peugeot 205 GTI	MON	SWE	POR	KEN	FRA	GRE	NZL	ARG	FIN	AUS	ITA	CIV	ESP; 12	GBR			-	0
1992	Peugeot Talbot Sport	Peugeot 309 GTI	MON	SWE	POR	KEN	FRA	GRE	NZL	ARG	FIN	AUS	ITA	CIV	ESP; Ret	GBR			-	0
1994	Jesús Puras	Ford Escort RS Cosworth	MON	POR; 8	KEN	FRA; 14	GRE	ARG; Ret	NZL; Ret	FIN	ITA; 17	GBR							31st	3
1995	Jesús Puras	Citroën ZX 16S	MON	SWE	POR	FRA	NZL	AUS	ESP; Ret	GBR									-	0
1996	Jesús Puras	Seat Ibiza GTi 16V	SWE	KEN	INA	GRE	ARG; Ret	FIN	AUS; Ret	ITA	ESP; 15								-	0
1997	Jesús Puras	Citroën ZX 16S	MON	SWE	KEN	POR	ESP; Ret	FRA	ARG	GRE	NZL	FIN	INA	ITA	AUS	GBR			-	0
1998	Jesús Puras	Citroën Xsara	MON	SWE	KEN	POR	ESP; Ret	FRA	ARG	GRE	NZL	FIN	ITA; Ret	AUS	GBR				-	0
1999	Salvador Cañellas Jr.	Seat Ibiza GTi 16V Evo2	MON	SWE; 46	KEN	POR; Ret	ESP; 39	FRA	ARG	GRE	NZL	FIN	CHN	ITA	AUS	GBR			-	0
2000	Salvador Cañellas Jr.	Seat Córdoba WRC	MON	SWE	KEN	POR	ESP; Ret	ARG	GRE	NZL	FIN	CYP	FRA	ITA	AUS	GBR			-	0
2002	Jesús Puras	Citroën Xsara WRC	MON	SWE	FRA	ESP; 12	CYP	ARG	GRE	KEN	FIN	GER	ITA; 6	NZL	AUS	GBR			19th	1
2004	Dani Sordo	Mitsubishi Lancer Evo VII	MON	SWE	MEX	NZL	CYP	GRE	TUR	ARG; Ret	FIN	GER; 19	JPN	GBR	ITA	FRA; 13			-	0
2004	Dani Sordo	Citroën C2 S1600															ESP; 20	AUS	-	0
2005	Ricardo Triviño	Peugeot 206 WRC	MON	SWE	MEX; 12	NZL	ITA	CYP	TUR										7th	16
2005	OMV World Rally Team	Citroën Xsara WRC								GRE; 10	ARG; 10	FIN; 12	GER; 9	GBR; 11	JPN	FRA; 7	ESP; 4	AUS; Ret	7th	16
2006	Kronos Citroën	Citroën Xsara WRC	MON; 9	SWE; 7	MEX; Ret	ESP; Ret	FRA; 6	ARG; 17	ITA; 4	GRE; 8	GER; 14	FIN; Ret	JPN	CYP; 7	TUR; 4	AUS; 4	NZL; 4	GBR; 5	7th	32
2007	Dani Solá	Honda Civic Type-R	MON	SWE	NOR	MEX	POR	ARG	ITA	GRE	FIN	GER	NZL	ESP; 20					-	0
2007	Dani Solá	Peugeot 207 S2000													FRA; 10	JPN	IRE	GBR	-	0
2010	Mazen Tantash	Mitsubishi Lancer Evo IX	SWE	MEX	JOR; Ret	TUR	NZL	POR	BUL	FIN	GER	JPN	FRA	ESP	GBR				-	0
2011	Mini WRC Team	Mini John Cooper Works WRC	SWE	MEX	POR	JOR	ITA; 6	ARG	GRE	FIN; Ret	GER; 3	AUS	FRA; 2	ESP; 4	GBR; 20				8th	59
2012	Mini WRC Team	Mini John Cooper Works WRC	MON; 2	SWE; Ret	MEX														11th	35
2012	Prodrive WRC Team	Mini John Cooper Works WRC				POR; 11		GRE	NZL; 6	FIN	GER; 9	GBR	FRA; Ret	ITA	ESP; 9				11th	35
2012	Ford World Rally Team	Ford Fiesta RS WRC					ARG; Ret												11th	35
2013	Abu Dhabi Citroën Total WRT	Citroën DS3 WRC	MON; 3	SWE; Ret			ARG; 9						FRA; 2						5th	123
2013	Citroën Total Abu Dhabi WRT	Citroën DS3 WRC			MEX; 4	POR; 12		GRE; 2	ITA; 4	FIN; 5	GER; 1	AUS		ESP; Ret	GBR; 7				5th	123
2014	Nicolas Amiouni	Ford Fiesta R2	MON	SWE	MEX	POR; Ret	ARG	ITA	POL	FIN	GER	AUS	FRA	ESP	GBR				-	0
2018	Hyundai Shell Mobis WRT	Hyundai i20 Coupe WRC	MON; Ret	SWE	MEX; 2	FRA; 4	ARG; 3	POR; 4	ITA	FIN	GER; Ret	TUR	GBR	ESP; 5	AUS				8th	71
2019	Hyundai Shell Mobis WRT	Hyundai i20 Coupe WRC	MON	SWE	MEX; 9	FRA; 4	ARG; 6	CHL	POR; 23	ITA; 1	FIN	GER; 5	TUR; 5	GBR	ESP; 3	AUS; C			8th	89
2020	Hyundai Shell Mobis WRT	Hyundai i20 Coupe WRC	MON	SWE	MEX; Ret	EST	TUR	ITA; 1	MNZ; 3										8th	42
2021	Hyundai Shell Mobis WRT	Hyundai i20 Coupe WRC	MON; 5																18th	11
2021	Fabrizio Zaldivar	Škoda Fabia R5 Evo		ARC; 33	CRO; 17	POR; 18	ITA; 11	KEN	EST; 20	BEL	GRE; 33	FIN	ESP; 23	MNZ					18th	11
2022	Hyundai Motorsport N	Hyundai i20 N Rally2	MON	SWE	CRO	POR; 31	ITA; 33	KEN	EST	FIN	BEL	GRE	NZL						NC	0
2022	Bruno Bulacia	Škoda Fabia Rally2 evo												ESP; 36	JPN				NC	0
