= 2019 Rally de Portugal =

53rd edition of Rally de Portugal

2019 Rally de Portugal: 53. Vodafone Rally de Portugal
Round 7 of 14 in the 2019 World Rally Championship
← Previous event	Next event →
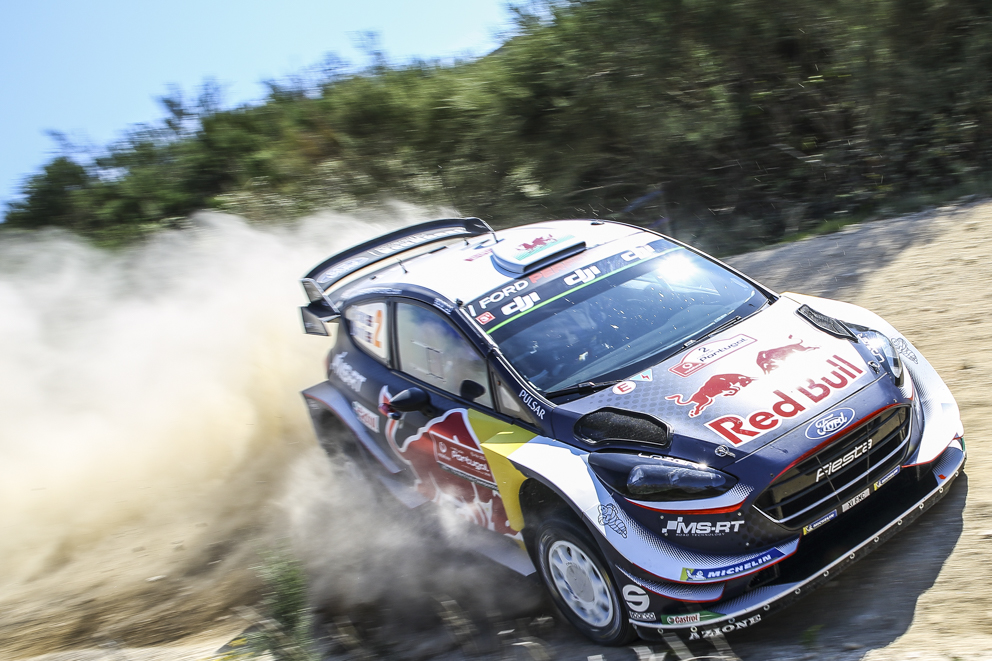
- Rocks and deep ruts are the features of the rally.
- Host country: Portugal
- Rally base: Matosinhos, Porto
- Dates run: 30 May – 2 June 2019
- Start location: Lousã, Coimbra
- Finish location: Fafe, Braga
- Stages: 20 (311.47 km; 193.54 miles)
- Stage surface: Gravel
- Transport distance: 1,429.19 km (888.06 miles)
- Overall distance: 1,117.96 km (694.67 miles)

Statistics
- Crews registered: 61
- Crews: 60 at start, 33 at finish

Overall results
- Overall winner: (Estonia) Ott Tänak (Estonia) Martin Järveoja (Japan) Toyota Gazoo Racing WRT; 3:20:22.8
- Power Stage winner: (France) Sébastien Ogier (France) Julien Ingrassia (France) Citroën Total WRT

Support category results
- WRC-2 winner: (France) Pierre-Louis Loubet (France) Vincent Landais (France) Pierre-Louis Loubet; 3:33:09.1

The 2019 Rally de Portugal (also known as the Vodafone Rally de Portugal 2019) was a motor racing event for rally cars that was held over four days between 30 May and 2 June 2019. It marked the fifty-third running of Rally de Portugal, and was the seventh round of the 2019 World Rally Championship, World Rally Championship-2 and the newly created WRC-2 Pro class. The rally was also part of the Portuguese national championship and Peugeot Rally Cup Ibérica. The 2019 event was based in Matosinhos in Porto and consisted of twenty special stages totalling 311.47 km (193.54 mi) competitive kilometres.

Thierry Neuville and Nicolas Gilsoul were the defending rally winners. Their team, Hyundai Shell Mobis WRT, were the manufacturers' winners. Pontus Tidemand and Jonas Andersson were the defending winners in the World Rally Championship-2 category, but they did not participate in the rally. The Swedish crew Denis Rådström and Johan Johansson were the reigning World Rally Championship-3 winners, but they did not defend their titles as the category was discontinued in 2019.

Ott Tänak and Martin Järveoja won the Rally de Portugal for the first time in their career. Their team, Toyota Gazoo Racing WRT, were the manufacturers' winners. The Škoda Motorsport crew of Kalle Rovanperä and Jonne Halttunen took the back-to-back victory in the WRC-2 Pro category, finishing first in the combined WRC-2 category, while the French crew of Pierre-Louis Loubet and Vincent Landais won the wider WRC-2 class.

== Background ==
=== Championship standings prior to the event ===
Defending world champions Sébastien Ogier and Julien Ingrassia led both the drivers' and co-drivers' championships with a ten-point lead over Ott Tänak and Martin Järveoja. Thierry Neuville and Nicolas Gilsoul were third, a further two points behind. In the World Rally Championship for Manufacturers, Hyundai Shell Mobis WRT held a twenty-nine-point lead over Toyota Gazoo Racing WRT.

In the World Rally Championship-2 Pro standings, Gus Greensmith and Elliott Edmondson held a five-point lead ahead of Mads Østberg and Torstein Eriksen in the drivers' and co-drivers' standings respectively. Łukasz Pieniążek and Kamil Heller were third, six points further back. In the manufacturers' championship, M-Sport Ford WRT led Škoda Motorsport by sixty-two points, with Citroën Total fifteen points further behind in third.

In the World Rally Championship-2 standings, Benito Guerra and Jaime Zapata led the drivers' and co-drivers' standings by fourteen points respectively. Takamoto Katsuta and Daniel Barritt were second, following by Ole Christian Veiby and Jonas Andersson in third.

=== Entry list ===
The following crews entered into the rally. The event opened to crews competing in the World Rally Championship, World Rally Championship-2, WRC-2 Pro, Portuguese national championship, Peugeot Rally Cup Ibérica and privateer entries not registered to score points in any championship. A total of sixty-one entries were received, with twelve crews entered with World Rally Cars and twenty-seven entered the World Rally Championship-2. Four crews were nominated to score points in the Pro class.

No.	Driver	Co-Driver	Entrant	Car	Tyre
World Rally Car entries
1	(France) Sébastien Ogier	(France) Julien Ingrassia	(France) Citroën Total WRT	Citroën C3 WRC	MI
3	(Finland) Teemu Suninen	(Finland) Marko Salminen	(United Kingdom) M-Sport Ford WRT	Ford Fiesta WRC	MI
4	(Finland) Esapekka Lappi	(Finland) Janne Ferm	(France) Citroën Total WRT	Citroën C3 WRC	MI
5	(United Kingdom) Kris Meeke	(United Kingdom) Sebastian Marshall	(Japan) Toyota Gazoo Racing WRT	Toyota Yaris WRC	MI
6	(Spain) Dani Sordo	(Spain) Carlos del Barrio	(South Korea) Hyundai Shell Mobis WRT	Hyundai i20 Coupe WRC	MI
8	(Estonia) Ott Tänak	(Estonia) Martin Järveoja	(Japan) Toyota Gazoo Racing WRT	Toyota Yaris WRC	MI
10	(Finland) Jari-Matti Latvala	(Finland) Miikka Anttila	(Japan) Toyota Gazoo Racing WRT	Toyota Yaris WRC	MI
11	(Belgium) Thierry Neuville	(Belgium) Nicolas Gilsoul	(South Korea) Hyundai Shell Mobis WRT	Hyundai i20 Coupe WRC	MI
19	(France) Sébastien Loeb	(Monaco) Daniel Elena	(South Korea) Hyundai Shell Mobis WRT	Hyundai i20 Coupe WRC	MI
33	(United Kingdom) Elfyn Evans	(United Kingdom) Scott Martin	(United Kingdom) M-Sport Ford WRT	Ford Fiesta WRC	MI
44	(United Kingdom) Gus Greensmith	(United Kingdom) Elliott Edmondson	(United Kingdom) M-Sport Ford WRT	Ford Fiesta WRC	MI
World Rally Championship-2 Pro entries
21	(Norway) Mads Østberg	(Norway) Torstein Eriksen	(France) Citroën Total (Note: Entry run in conjunction with DG Sport.)	Citroën C3 R5	MI
22	(Poland) Łukasz Pieniążek	(Poland) Jakub Gerber	(United Kingdom) M-Sport Ford WRT	Ford Fiesta R5	MI
23	(Finland) Kalle Rovanperä	(Finland) Jonne Halttunen	(Czech Republic) Škoda Motorsport	Škoda Fabia R5 Evo	MI
24	(Czech Republic) Jan Kopecký	(Czech Republic) Pavel Dresler	(Czech Republic) Škoda Motorsport	Škoda Fabia R5 Evo	MI
World Rally Championship-2 entries
41	(Mexico) Benito Guerra	(Mexico) Jaime Zapata	(Mexico) Benito Guerra (Note: Entry operated by Race Seven.)	Škoda Fabia R5	MI
42	(Japan) Takamoto Katsuta	(United Kingdom) Daniel Barritt	(Japan) Takamoto Katsuta (Note: Entry operated by Tommi Mäkinen Racing.)	Ford Fiesta R5	P
43	(Norway) Ole Christian Veiby	(Sweden) Jonas Andersson	(Norway) Ole Christian Veiby (Note: Entry operated by Volkswagen Dealerteam Bauhaus.)	Volkswagen Polo GTI R5	MI
45	(Russia) Nikolay Gryazin	(Russia) Yaroslav Fedorov	(Russia) Nikolay Gryazin (Note: Entry operated by Sports Racing Technologies.)	Škoda Fabia R5	MI
46	(Chile) Alberto Heller	(Argentina) José Díaz	(Chile) Alberto Heller	Ford Fiesta R5	MI
47	(Sweden) Emil Bergkvist	(Sweden) Patrik Barth	(Sweden) Emil Bergkvist	Ford Fiesta R5	P
48	(Belgium) Guillaume De Mevius	(Belgium) Martijn Wydaeghe	(Belgium) Guillaume De Mevius (Note: Entry operated by DG Sport.)	Citroën C3 R5	MI
49	(Norway) Henning Solberg	(Austria) Ilka Minor-Petrasko	(Norway) Henning Solberg (Note: Entry operated by Toksport World Rally Team.)	Škoda Fabia R5	MI
50	(Italy) "Pedro" (Note: Pseudonym of Massimo Pedretti.)	(Italy) Emanuele Baldaccini	(Italy) "Pedro"	Ford Fiesta R5	P
51	(France) Pierre-Louis Loubet	(France) Vincent Landais	(France) Pierre-Louis Loubet (Note: Entry operated by Qatar 2C World Rally Team.)	Škoda Fabia R5	MI
52	(Portugal) Ricardo Teodósio	(Portugal) José Teixeira	(Portugal) Ricardo Teodósio	Škoda Fabia R5	MI
53	(Romania) Simone Tempestini	(Romania) Sergiu Itu	(Romania) Simone Tempestini (Note: Entry operated by Friulmotor Rally Team.)	Hyundai i20 R5	P
54	(Portugal) Miguel Barbosa	(Portugal) Jorge Carvalho	(Portugal) Miguel Barbosa (Note: Entry operated by BP Ultimate Vodafone Škoda Team.)	Škoda Fabia R5	P
55	(Portugal) Armindo Araújo	(Portugal) Luís Ramalho	(Portugal) Armindo Araújo (Note: Entry operated by Team Hyundai Portugal.)	Hyundai i20 R5	MI
56	(Finland) Eerik Pietarinen	(Finland) Juhana Raitanen	(Finland) Eerik Pietarinen (Note: Entry operated by TGS Worldwide.)	Škoda Fabia R5	P
57	(Portugal) José Pedro Fontes	(Portugal) Inês Ponte	(Portugal) José Pedro Fontes (Note: Entry operated by Citroën Vodafone Team.)	Citroën C3 R5	P
58	(Finland) Jari Huttunen	(Finland) Antti Linnaketo	(Finland) Jari Huttunen	Hyundai i20 R5	P
59	(Portugal) Bruno Magalhães	(Portugal) Hugo Magalhães	(Portugal) Bruno Magalhães	Hyundai i20 R5	MI
60	(Portugal) Pedro Meireles	(Portugal) Mário Castro	(Portugal) Pedro Meireles (Note: Entry operated by Racing 4 You.)	Volkswagen Polo GTI R5	MI
61	(Portugal) Pedro Almeida	(Portugal) Nuno Almeida	(Portugal) Pedro Almeida	Škoda Fabia R5	MI
62	(Portugal) António Dias	(Portugal) Nuno Rodrigues da Silva	(Portugal) António Dias	Škoda Fabia R5	MI
63	(Portugal) Diogo Salvi	(Portugal) Paulo Babo	(Portugal) Diogo Salvi	Škoda Fabia R5	MI
64	(United Kingdom) Rhys Yates	(United Kingdom) James Morgan	(United Kingdom) Rhys Yates	Škoda Fabia R5	P

=== Route ===
The 2019 route cut 46.72 km (29.0 mi) from the 2018 itinerary to meet the regulation of the 350 km (217.5 mi) maximum total distance.

==== Itinerary ====
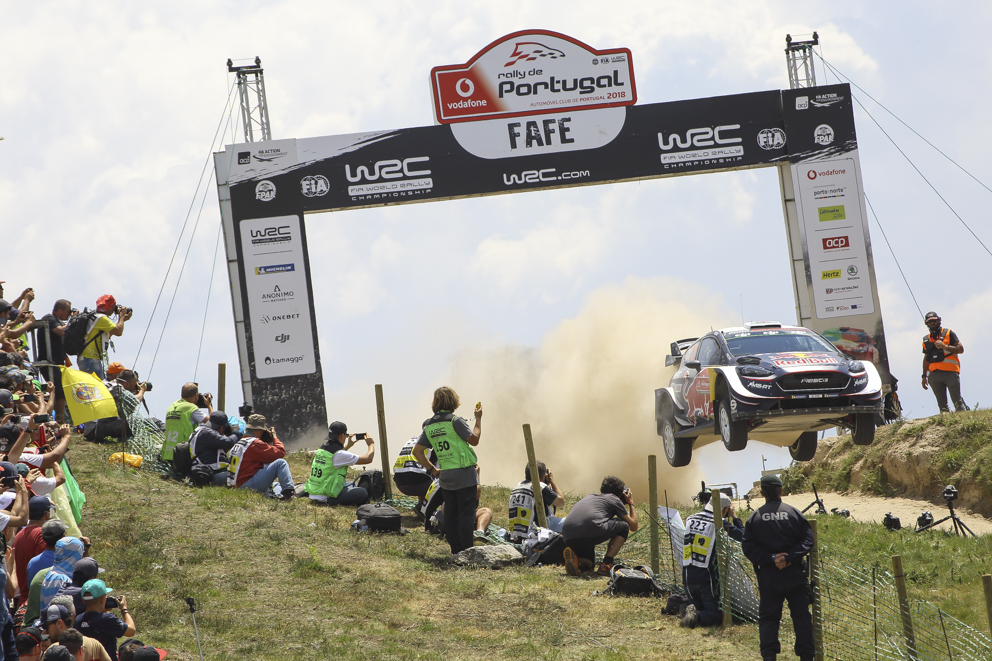
The Ford Fiesta WRC of Elfyn Evans and Daniel Barritt jumping at the Rally de Portugal's iconic Fafe stage.

All dates and times are WEST (UTC+1).

Date	Time	No.	Stage name	Distance
30 May	08:00	—	Paredes [Shakedown]	4.60 km
Leg 1 — 94.50 km
31 May	9:48	SS1	Lousã 1	12.35 km
31 May	10:32	SS2	Góis 1	18.78 km
31 May	11:20	SS3	Arganil 1	14.44 km
31 May	13:51	SS4	Lousã 2	12.35 km
31 May	14:35	SS5	Góis 2	18.78 km
31 May	15:23	SS6	Arganil 2	14.44 km
31 May	19:03	SS7	Lousada	3.36 km
Leg 2 — 165.20 km
1 June	8:08	SS8	Vieira do Minho 1	20.53 km
1 June	9:08	SS9	Cabeceiras de Basto 1	22.22 km
1 June	10:20	SS10	Amarante 1	37.60 km
1 June	15:13	SS11	Vieira do Minho 2	20.53 km
1 June	15:54	SS12	Cabeceiras de Basto 2	22.22 km
1 June	17:10	SS13	Amarante 2	37.60 km
1 June	19:03	SS14	Gaia Street Stage 1	2.25 km
1 June	19:28	SS15	Gaia Street Stage 2	2.25 km
Leg 3 — 51.77 km
2 June	08:35	SS16	Montim 1	8.76 km
2 June	09:08	SS17	Fafe 1	11.18 km
2 June	09:49	SS18	Luílhas	11.89 km
2 June	10:35	SS19	Montim 2	8.76 km
2 June	12:18	SS20	Fafe 2 [Power Stage]	11.18 km

== Report ==
=== World Rally Cars ===
Hyundai Motorsport had initially planned to enter Andreas Mikkelsen for the rally but he was dropped in favour of Sébastien Loeb, due to Mikkelsen's inconsistent form on gravel. However, Loeb's rally was conceded almost sixteen minutes as his fuel system failed. So was his teammate Dani Sordo, who grabbed an early lead until the similar issue happened to him. Following Hyundai's double disasters, Toyota managed to end the day with an 1-2-3. Teemu Suninen was the only driver can match Yaris' pace, but a brake failure pushed the Finn down to sixth. Teammate Elfyn Evans hit trouble as well. The Welshman lost almost four minutes when his Fiesta stopped with an electrical problem, which raised heavy dust when went back on the road. The dust affected greatly on Esapekka Lappi, who suffered a puncture early before, but the time he loss was later credited back to him.

On day two, rally leader Ott Tänak hit a damper issue and slashed his lead to just 4.3 seconds. Teammate Jari-Matti Latvala suffered the same problem, but he was unable to finish the rally, so Rally2 for the Finn. A double dose of tactics by Thierry Neuville's Hyundai team boosted him to third, less than ten seconds off the lead. Gus Greensmith had to retire from the day as he crashed his Fiesta into a ditch.

Eventually, Tänak secured a back-to-back victory, while the final day saw four major retirements. Esapekka Lappi was running fifth until he hit a bank and broke the rear left suspension. Kris Meeke spun out second place to his rival before he retired as he crashed into a tree. Gus Greensmith's WRC debut ended up with a crash in the final Fafe stage. Sébastien Loeb was another late casualty, retiring his i20 after hitting a bank in the same stage despite the fact that he had crossed the finishing line.

==== Classification ====
Position		No.	Driver	Co-driver	Entrant	Car	Time	Difference	Points	
Event	Class	No.	Driver	Co-driver	Entrant	Car	Time	Difference	Event	Stage
1	1	8	Ott Tänak	Martin Järveoja	Toyota Gazoo Racing WRT	Toyota Yaris WRC	3:20:22.8	0.0	25	3
2	2	11	Thierry Neuville	Nicolas Gilsoul	Hyundai Shell Mobis WRT	Hyundai i20 Coupe WRC	3:20:38.7	+15.9	18	4
3	3	1	Sébastien Ogier	Julien Ingrassia	Citroën Total WRT	Citroën C3 WRC	3:21:19.9	+57.1	15	5
4	4	3	Teemu Suninen	Marko Salminen	M-Sport Ford WRT	Ford Fiesta WRC	3:23:04.3	+2:41.5	12	2
5	5	33	Elfyn Evans	Scott Martin	M-Sport Ford WRT	Ford Fiesta WRC	3:27:31.1	+7:08.3	10	0
7	6	10	Jari-Matti Latvala	Miikka Anttila	Toyota Gazoo Racing WRT	Toyota Yaris WRC	3:26:53.0	+10:59.2	6	0
23	7	6	Dani Sordo	Carlos del Barrio	Hyundai Shell Mobis WRT	Hyundai i20 Coupe WRC	3:47:47.6	+27:24.8	0	1
Retired SS20		19	Sébastien Loeb	Daniel Elena	Hyundai Shell Mobis WRT	Hyundai i20 Coupe WRC	Lost wheel		0	0
Retired SS20		5	Kris Meeke	Sebastian Marshall	Toyota Gazoo Racing WRT	Toyota Yaris WRC	Lost wheel		0	0
Retired SS20		44	Gus Greensmith	Scott Martin	M-Sport Ford WRT	Ford Fiesta WRC	Accident		0	0
Retired SS18		4	Esapekka Lappi	Janne Ferm	Citroën Total WRT	Citroën C3 WRC	Suspension		0	0

==== Special stages ====
Date	No.	Stage name	Distance	Winners	Car	Time	Class leaders
30 May	—	Talcahuano [Shakedown]	6.45 km	Neuville / Gilsoul	Hyundai i20 Coupe WRC	3:02.1	—N/a
31 May	SS1	Lousã 1	12.35 km	Sordo / del Barrio	Hyundai i20 Coupe WRC	9:06.9	Sordo / del Barrio
31 May	SS2	Góis 1	18.78 km	Tänak / Järveoja	Toyota Yaris WRC	12:19.7	Sordo / del Barrio
31 May	SS3	Arganil 1	14.62 km	Tänak / Järveoja	Toyota Yaris WRC	9:00.0	Tänak / Järveoja
31 May	SS4	Lousã 2	12.35 km	Sordo / del Barrio	Hyundai i20 Coupe WRC	8:59.2	Tänak / Järveoja
31 May	SS5	Góis 2	18.78 km	Suninen / Salminen	Ford Fiesta WRC	12:18.9	Tänak / Järveoja
31 May	SS6	Arganil 2	14.62 km	Neuville / Gilsoul	Hyundai i20 Coupe WRC	8:58.5	Tänak / Järveoja
31 May	SS7	Lousada	3.36 km	Neuville / Gilsoul	Hyundai i20 Coupe WRC	2:35.5	Tänak / Järveoja
1 June	SS8	Vieira do Minho 1	20.53 km	Meeke / Marshall	Toyota Yaris WRC	12:59.3	Tänak / Järveoja
1 June	SS9	Cabeceiras de Basto 1	22.22 km	Latvala / Anttila	Toyota Yaris WRC	13:43.0	Tänak / Järveoja
1 June	SS10	Amarante 1	37.60 km	Latvala / Anttila	Toyota Yaris WRC	25:10.4	Tänak / Järveoja
1 June	SS11	Vieira do Minho 2	20.53 km	Tänak / Järveoja	Toyota Yaris WRC	12:51.5	Tänak / Järveoja
1 June	SS12	Cabeceiras de Basto 2	22.22 km	Neuville / Gilsoul	Hyundai i20 Coupe WRC	13:35.9	Tänak / Järveoja
1 June	SS13	Amarante 2	37.60 km	Neuville / Gilsoul	Hyundai i20 Coupe WRC	25:02.2	Tänak / Järveoja
1 June	SS14	Gaia Street Stage 1	2.25 km	Stage cancelled (Note: SS14 and SS15 were cancelled before the rally started.)			
1 June	SS15	Gaia Street Stage 2	2.25 km	Stage cancelled			
2 June	SS16	Montim 1	8.64 km	Meeke / Marshall	Toyota Yaris WRC	5:49.1	Tänak / Järveoja
2 June	SS17	Fafe 1	11.18 km	Tänak / Järveoja	Toyota Yaris WRC	6:38.6	Tänak / Järveoja
2 June	SS18	Luílhas	11.89 km	Tänak / Järveoja	Toyota Yaris WRC	8:05.7	Tänak / Järveoja
2 June	SS19	Montim 2	8.64 km	Neuville / Gilsoul	Hyundai i20 Coupe WRC	5:46.3	Tänak / Järveoja
2 June	SS20	Fafe 2 [Power stage]	11.18 km	Ogier / Ingrassia	Citroën C3 WRC	6:35.0	Tänak / Järveoja

==== Championship standings ====
Pos.	Drivers' championships			Co-drivers' championships			Manufacturers' championships		
Pos.	Move	Driver	Points	Move	Co-driver	Points	Move	Manufacturer	Points
1		Sébastien Ogier	142		Julien Ingrassia	142		Hyundai Shell Mobis WRT	202
2		Ott Tänak	140		Martin Järveoja	140		Toyota Gazoo Racing WRT	182
3		Thierry Neuville	132		Nicolas Gilsoul	132		Citroën Total WRT	158
4	1	Elfyn Evans	65	1	Scott Martin	65		M-Sport Ford WRT	122
5	1	Kris Meeke	56	1	Sebastian Marshall	56			

=== World Rally Championship-2 Pro ===
Škoda Motorsport débuted a new-generation Fabia R5, the Škoda Fabia R5 Evo, driven by drivers Jan Kopecký and Kalle Rovanperä. Rovanperä led the category comfortably until a puncture lost his lead to Kopecký. Mads Østberg was unable to finish the leg as he suffered several issues including brake problems, damaged suspension and puncture. In leg two, Rovanperä recaptured the lead as the Škoda Fabia R5 Evo's bonnet of Kopecký broke free from its fastenings after a heavy landing from a jump. Lukasz Pieniazek crashed into a tree and forced to retire from the day. In the end, Rovanperä claimed the victory as well as moving up to the top of the class standings.

==== Classification ====
Position		No.	Driver	Co-driver	Entrant	Car	Time	Difference	Points	
Event	Class	No.	Driver	Co-driver	Entrant	Car	Time	Difference	Class	Event
6	1	22	Kalle Rovanperä	Jonne Halttunen	Škoda Motorsport	Škoda Fabia R5 Evo	3:30:57.0	0.0	**25**	**8**
8	2	24	Jan Kopecký	Pavel Dresler	Škoda Motorsport	Škoda Fabia R5 Evo	3:32:04.7	+1:07.7	**18**	**4**
24	3	21	Mads Østberg	Torstein Eriksen	Citroën Total	Citroën C3 R5	3:50:05.6	+19:08.6	**15**	**0**
27	4	22	Łukasz Pieniążek	Jakub Gerber	M-Sport Ford WRT	Ford Fiesta R5	4:01:52.1	+30:55.1	**12**	**0**

==== Special stages ====
Results in bold denote first in the RC2 class, the class which both the WRC-2 Pro and WRC-2 championships run to.

Date	No.	Stage name	Distance	Winners	Car	Time	Class leaders
30 May	—	Talcahuano [Shakedown]	6.45 km	**Rovanperä / Halttunen**	Škoda Fabia R5 Evo	3:10.1	—N/a
31 May	SS1	Lousã 1	12.35 km	**Rovanperä / Halttunen**	Škoda Fabia R5 Evo	9:36.4	Rovanperä / Halttunen
31 May	SS2	Góis 1	18.78 km	**Rovanperä / Halttunen**	Škoda Fabia R5 Evo	12:54.7	Rovanperä / Halttunen
31 May	SS3	Arganil 1	14.62 km	**Rovanperä / Halttunen**	Škoda Fabia R5 Evo	9:36.1	Rovanperä / Halttunen
31 May	SS4	Lousã 2	12.35 km	**Østberg / Eriksen**	Citroën C3 R5	9:26.1	Kopecký / Dresler
31 May	SS5	Góis 2	18.78 km	Kopecký / Dresler	Škoda Fabia R5 Evo	12:58.5	Kopecký / Dresler
31 May	SS6	Arganil 2	14.62 km	**Rovanperä / Halttunen**	Škoda Fabia R5 Evo	9:30.4	Kopecký / Dresler
31 May	SS7	Lousada	3.36 km	Rovanperä / Halttunen	Škoda Fabia R5 Evo	2:42.5	Kopecký / Dresler
1 June	SS8	Vieira do Minho 1	20.53 km	**Rovanperä / Halttunen**	Škoda Fabia R5 Evo	13:33.6	Rovanperä / Halttunen
1 June	SS9	Cabeceiras de Basto 1	22.22 km	**Rovanperä / Halttunen**	Škoda Fabia R5 Evo	14:28.0	Rovanperä / Halttunen
1 June	SS10	Amarante 1	37.60 km	**Rovanperä / Halttunen**	Škoda Fabia R5 Evo	26:21.5	Rovanperä / Halttunen
1 June	SS11	Vieira do Minho 2	20.53 km	**Rovanperä / Halttunen**	Škoda Fabia R5 Evo	13:31.7	Rovanperä / Halttunen
1 June	SS12	Cabeceiras de Basto 2	22.22 km	**Østberg / Eriksen**	Citroën C3 R5	14:24.1	Rovanperä / Halttunen
1 June	SS13	Amarante 2	37.60 km	**Rovanperä / Halttunen**	Škoda Fabia R5 Evo	26:11.2	Rovanperä / Halttunen
1 June	SS14	Gaia Street Stage 1	2.25 km	Stage cancelled			
1 June	SS15	Gaia Street Stage 2	2.25 km	Stage cancelled			
2 June	SS16	Montim 1	8.64 km	**Østberg / Eriksen**	Citroën C3 R5	6:04.5	Rovanperä / Halttunen
2 June	SS17	Fafe 1	11.18 km	**Østberg / Eriksen**	Citroën C3 R5	6:59.5	Rovanperä / Halttunen
2 June	SS18	Luílhas	11.89 km	**Østberg / Eriksen**	Citroën C3 R5	8:29.8	Rovanperä / Halttunen
2 June	SS19	Montim 2	8.64 km	**Østberg / Eriksen**; **Rovanperä / Halttunen**	Citroën C3 R5; Škoda Fabia R5 Evo	6:02.1	Rovanperä / Halttunen
2 June	SS20	Fafe 2	11.18 km	Pieniążek / Gerber	Ford Fiesta R5	7:04.1	Rovanperä / Halttunen

==== Championship standings ====
Pos.	Drivers' championships			Co-drivers' championships			Manufacturers' championships		
Pos.	Move	Driver	Points	Move	Co-driver	Points	Move	Manufacturer	Points
1	2	Kalle Rovanperä	86	2	Jonne Halttunen	86		M-Sport Ford WRT	147
2		Mads Østberg	83		Torstein Eriksen	83		Škoda Motorsport	116
3		Łukasz Pieniążek	74	1	Elliott Edmondson	73		Citroën Total	83
4	2	Gus Greensmith	73	1	Kamil Heller	62			
5		Jan Kopecký	18		Pavel Dresler	18			

=== World Rally Championship-2 ===
Ole Christian Veiby led Nikolay Gryazin by 25.2 seconds. Rhys Yates retired due to double punctures, while Jari Huttunen stopped with suspension damage. Local driver Pedro Meireles retired from the rally as his Polo R5 caught fire. Day two was full of dramas. Overnight leader Veiby's rally ended up with car on fire, which handled the lead to Takamoto Katsuta, who also retired from the day due to crashing. Other retirements included Jari Huttunen, who crashed his Hyundai i20 R5, and local driver Diogo Salvi. Eerik Pietarainen damaged his Fabia's suspension, which dropped him from second to fourth in the class standings. Following so many dramas, Pierre-Louis Loubet snatched the victory.

==== Classification ====
Position		No.	Driver	Co-driver	Entrant	Car	Time	Difference	Points	
Event	Class	No.	Driver	Co-driver	Entrant	Car	Time	Difference	Class	Event
9	1	51	Pierre-Louis Loubet	Vincent Landais	Pierre-Louis Loubet	Škoda Fabia R5	3:33:09.1	0.0	25	2
10	2	47	Emil Bergkvist	Patrik Barth	Emil Bergkvist	Ford Fiesta R5	3:34:51.2	+1:42.1	18	1
11	3	49	Henning Solberg	Ilka Minor-Petrasko	Henning Solberg	Škoda Fabia R5	3:35:17.3	+2:08.2	15	0
12	4	56	Eerik Pietarinen	Juhana Raitanen	Eerik Pietarinen	Škoda Fabia R5	3:35:32.6	+2:23.5	12	0
13	5	45	Nikolay Gryazin	Yaroslav Fedorov	Nikolay Gryazin	Škoda Fabia R5	3:35:33.4	+2:24.3	10	0
14	6	41	Benito Guerra	Jaime Zapata	Benito Guerra	Škoda Fabia R5	3:36:31.9	+3:22.8	8	0
15	7	46	Alberto Heller	José Díaz	Alberto Heller	Ford Fiesta R5	3:38:03.5	+4:54.4	6	0
16	8	55	Armindo Araújo	Luís Ramalho	Armindo Araújo	Hyundai i20 R5	3:39:00.2	+5:51.1	4	0
17	9	48	Guillaume De Mevius	Martijn Wydaeghe	Guillaume De Mevius	Citroën C3 R5	3:39:50.0	+6:40.9	2	0
18	10	53	Simone Tempestini	Sergiu Itu	Simone Tempestini	Hyundai i20 R5	3:40:15.5	+7:06.4	1	0
19	11	59	Bruno Magalhães	Hugo Magalhães	Bruno Magalhães	Hyundai i20 R5	3:41:12.2	+8:03.1	0	0
20	12	61	Pedro Almeida	Nuno Almeida	Pedro Almeida	Škoda Fabia R5	3:46:44.3	+13:35.2	0	0
21	13	42	Takamoto Katsuta	Daniel Barritt	Takamoto Katsuta	Ford Fiesta R5	3:47:27.6	+14:18.5	0	0
22	14	57	José Pedro Fontes	Inês Ponte	José Pedro Fontes	Citroën C3 R5	3:47:46.5	+14:37.4	0	0
25	15	64	Rhys Yates	James Morgan	Rhys Yates	Škoda Fabia R5	3:51:29.2	+18:20.1	0	0
26	16	50	"Pedro"	Emanuele Baldaccini	"Pedro"	Ford Fiesta R5	3:58:43.3	+25:34.2	0	0
Retired SS19		63	Diogo Salvi	Paulo Babo	Diogo Salvi	Škoda Fabia R5	Mechanical		0	0
Retired SS17		62	António Dias	Nuno Rodrigues da Silva	António Dias	Škoda Fabia R5	Mechanical		0	0
Retired SS11		52	Ricardo Teodósio	José Teixeira	Ricardo Teodósio	Škoda Fabia R5	Mechanical		0	0
Retired SS10		43	Ole Christian Veiby	Jonas Andersson	Ole Christian Veiby	Volkswagen Polo GTI R5	Fire		0	0
Retired SS10		58	Jari Huttunen	Antti Linnaketo	Jari Huttunen	Hyundai i20 R5	Off-road		0	0
Retired SS6		60	Pedro Meireles	Mário Castro	Pedro Meireles	Volkswagen Polo GTI R5	Fire		0	0
Retired SS3		54	Miguel Barbosa	Jorge Carvalho	Miguel Barbosa	Škoda Fabia R5	Mechanical		0	0

==== Special stages ====
Results in bold denote first in the RC2 class, the class which both the WRC-2 Pro and WRC-2 championships run to.

Date	No.	Stage name	Distance	Winners	Car	Time	Class leaders
30 May	—	Talcahuano [Shakedown]	6.45 km	Loubet / Landais	Škoda Fabia R5	3:12.4	—N/a
31 May	SS1	Lousã 1	12.35 km	Loubet / Landais	Škoda Fabia R5	9:33.4	Loubet / Landais
31 May	SS2	Góis 1	18.78 km	Veiby / Andersson	Volkswagen Polo GTI R5	13:04.2	Veiby / Andersson
31 May	SS3	Arganil 1	14.62 km	Katsuta / Barritt	Ford Fiesta R5	9:42.2	Veiby / Andersson
31 May	SS4	Lousã 2	12.35 km	Gryazin / Fedorov	Škoda Fabia R5	9:27.5	Veiby / Andersson
31 May	SS5	Góis 2	18.78 km	**Veiby / Andersson**	Volkswagen Polo GTI R5	12:57.2	Veiby / Andersson
31 May	SS6	Arganil 2	14.62 km	Veiby / Andersson	Volkswagen Polo GTI R5	9:37.6	Veiby / Andersson
31 May	SS7	Lousada	3.36 km	**Loubet / Landais**	Škoda Fabia R5	2:41.0	Veiby / Andersson
1 June	SS8	Vieira do Minho 1	20.53 km	Veiby / Andersson	Volkswagen Polo GTI R5	13:43.5	Veiby / Andersson
1 June	SS9	Cabeceiras de Basto 1	22.22 km	Veiby / Andersson	Volkswagen Polo GTI R5	14:31.2	Veiby / Andersson
1 June	SS10	Amarante 1	37.60 km	Pietarinen / Raitanen	Škoda Fabia R5	26:49.5	Katsuta / Barritt
1 June	SS11	Vieira do Minho 2	20.53 km	Loubet / Landais	Škoda Fabia R5	13:37.9	Katsuta / Barritt
1 June	SS12	Cabeceiras de Basto 2	22.22 km	Gryazin / Fedorov	Škoda Fabia R5	9:27.5	Loubet / Landais
1 June	SS13	Amarante 2	37.60 km	Solberg / Minor-Petrasko	Škoda Fabia R5	26:37.9	Loubet / Landais
1 June	SS14	Gaia Street Stage 1	2.25 km	Stage cancelled			
1 June	SS15	Gaia Street Stage 2	2.25 km	Stage cancelled			
2 June	SS16	Montim 1	8.64 km	Gryazin / Fedorov	Škoda Fabia R5	6:07.7	Loubet / Landais
2 June	SS17	Fafe 1	11.18 km	Katsuta / Barritt	Ford Fiesta R5	7:07.8	Loubet / Landais
2 June	SS18	Luílhas	11.89 km	Katsuta / Barritt; Gryazin / Fedorov	Ford Fiesta R5; Škoda Fabia R5	8:33.2	Loubet / Landais
2 June	SS19	Montim 2	8.64 km	Katsuta / Barritt	Ford Fiesta R5	6:02.3	Loubet / Landais
2 June	SS20	Fafe 2	11.18 km	**Katsuta / Barritt**	Ford Fiesta R5	7:02.3	Loubet / Landais

==== Championship standings ====
Pos.	Drivers' championships			Co-drivers' championships		
Pos.	Move	Driver	Points	Move	Co-driver	Points
1		Benito Guerra	69		Jaime Zapata	69
2		Takamoto Katsuta	47		Daniel Barritt	47
3		Ole Christian Veiby	40		Jonas Andersson	40
4		Nikolay Gryazin	38		Yaroslav Fedorov	38
5		Alberto Heller	33		José Díaz	33

== Notes ==
Previous rally: 2019 Rally Chile	2019 FIA World Rally Championship	Next rally: 2019 Rally Italia Sardegna
Previous rally: 2018 Rally de Portugal	2019 Rally de Portugal	Next rally: 2021 Rally de Portugal; 2020 edition cancelled
