= Jonas Andersson (co-driver) =

Swedish rally co-driver (born 1977)

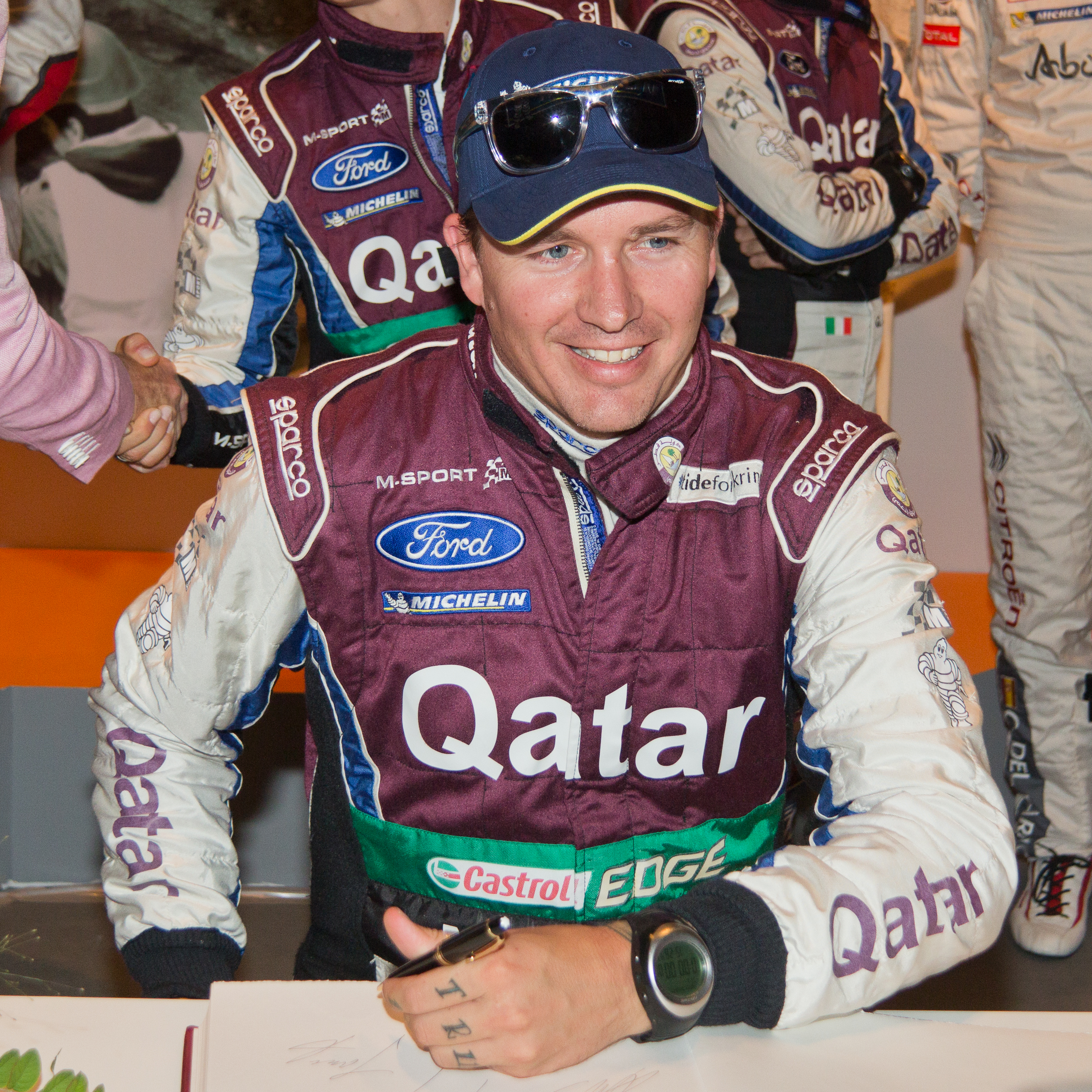
- Jonas Andersson at 2013 Rallye Deutschland

Personal information
- Nationality: (Sweden) Swedish
- Full name: Jonas Anders Andersson
- Born: January 1, 1977 (age 49); Arvika, Sweden

World Rally Championship record
- Years active: 2002–present
- Driver: (Sweden) Per-Gunnar Andersson (Sweden) Mattias Ekström (United Kingdom) James Wozencroft (Norway) Mads Østberg (Norway) Ole Christian Veiby (Sweden) Pontus Tidemand (United Kingdom) Gus Greensmith
- Teams: Suzuki, Adapta, M-Sport, Citroën, Škoda, Hyundai
- Rallies: 206
- Championships: 0
- Rally wins: 1
- Podiums: 14
- Stage wins: 56
- Total points: 739
- First rally: 2002 Swedish Rally
- First win: 2012 Rally de Portugal
- Last win: 2012 Rally de Portugal
- Last rally: 2026 Safari Rally

Jonas Anders Andersson (born 1 January 1977) is a Swedish rally co-driver. He is currently the co-driver of Gus Greensmith.

== Rally career ==
Andersson began his rally career in 2002, co-driving for Per-Gunnar Andersson. In the 2002 Rally Sweden, he made his WRC debut in a Renault Clio RS.

From 2009, Andersson started to partner with the Norwegian rally driver Mads Østberg. In the 2011 Rally Sweden, they achieved their first podium finish. One year later, in Portugal, the crew won their first and only WRC victory after Mikko Hirvonen's disqualification.

Starting from 2017, Andersson began to cooperate with Pontus Tidemand. They won the 2017 WRC-2 title at Škoda Motorsport in a Škoda Fabia R5.

The 2022 season saw Andersson moved to M-Sport, co-driving for Gus Greensmith on a full-season basis.

== WRC victories ==
#	Event	Season	Driver	Car
1	46° Rally de Portugal	2012	(Norway) Mads Østberg	Ford Fiesta RS WRC

== Rally results ==
=== WRC results ===
(key)

Year	Entrant	Car	1	2	3	4	5	6	7	8	9	10	11	12	13	14	15	16	WDC	Points
2002	Per-Gunnar Andersson	Renault Clio RS	MON	SWE; 43	FRA	ESP	CYP	ARG	GRE	KEN	FIN	GER	ITA	NZL	AUS	GBR			NC	0
2003	Per-Gunnar Andersson	Renault Clio S1600	MON	SWE	TUR	NZL	ARG	GRE	CYP	GER	FIN; Ret	AUS	ITA; 19	FRA	ESP; Ret	GBR; Ret			NC	0
2004	Per-Gunnar Andersson	Suzuki Ignis S1600	MON; 19					GRE; Ret	TUR; 11	ARG	FIN; 16	GER	JPN; Ret	GBR; Ret	ITA; 9	FRA	ESP; 16	AUS	NC	0
2004	Per-Gunnar Andersson	Mitsubishi Lancer Evo VII		SWE; 25	MEX	NZL	CYP												NC	0
2005	Per-Gunnar Andersson	Suzuki Ignis S1600	MON; 18	SWE; 18	MEX; 14	NZL; 17	ITA; 22	CYP; 33	TUR; 19	GRE; 15	ARG								NC	0
2005	Per-Gunnar Andersson	Suzuki Swift S1600										FIN; Ret	GER; 16	GBR; 22	JPN; 22	FRA	ESP; Ret	AUS	NC	0
2006	Per-Gunnar Andersson	Suzuki Swift S1600	MON	SWE; 19	MEX	ESP	FRA	ARG; 34	ITA; 21	GRE		FIN; 18	JPN	CYP	TUR; DSQ	AUS	NZL	GBR; Ret	NC	0
2006	Red Bull Škoda	Škoda Fabia WRC									GER; 11								NC	0
2007	Suzuki Sports Europe	Suzuki Swift S1600	MON	SWE	NOR; 18	MEX	POR; 14	ARG	ITA; 14	GRE	FIN	GER; 58	NZL	ESP; 15	FRA; 20	JPN	IRE	GBR	NC	0
2008	Suzuki World Rally Team	Suzuki SX4 WRC	MON; 8	SWE; Ret	MEX; Ret	ARG; 24	JOR; Ret	ITA; 9	GRE; 11	TUR; Ret	FIN; Ret	GER; 15	NZL; 6	ESP; 32	FRA; 17	JPN; 5	GBR; 5		12th	12
2009	Adapta AS	Subaru Impreza WRC2008	IRE	NOR	CYP	POR	ARG	ITA	GRE; 7	POL; Ret	FIN; Ret	AUS	ESP	GBR; Ret					11th	7
2010	Adapta AS	Subaru Impreza WRC2007	SWE; 8	MEX						FIN; 7					GBR; 9				11th	24
2010	Adapta AS	Subaru Impreza WRC2008						POR; 7											11th	24
2010	Stobart M-Sport	Ford Fiesta S2000									GER; 16	JPN	FRA; 41	ESP					11th	24
2010	Rufa Sport	Škoda Fabia S2000			JOR; 16	TUR	NZL												11th	24
2010	Stobart M-Sport Ford Rally Team	Ford Focus RS WRC 08							BUL; 7										11th	24
2011	M-Sport Stobart	Ford Fiesta RS WRC	SWE; 2	MEX; 5	POR; 31	JOR; 13	ITA; 5	ARG; 5	GRE; 12	FIN; 6	GER; Ret	AUS	FRA; 7	ESP; 6	GBR; 2				6th	88
2012	Mads Østberg	Ford Fiesta RS WRC	MON	SWE; 3															4th	149
2012	Adapta	Ford Fiesta RS WRC			MEX; 4	POR; 1	ARG; 3	GRE; 4	NZL	FIN; 5	GER; 4	GBR; 4	FRA; 5	ITA; 4	ESP; 4				4th	149
2013	Qatar M-Sport	Ford Fiesta RS WRC	MON; 6	SWE; 3	MEX; 11	POR; 8	ARG; 7	GRE; 6	ITA; 8	FIN; 3	GER; 9	AUS; 5	FRA; 8	ESP; 6	GBR; 4				6th	103
2014	Citroën Total Abu Dhabi	Citroën DS3 WRC	MON; 4	SWE; 3	MEX; 9	POR; 3	ARG; Ret	ITA; 2	POL; Ret	FIN; Ret	GER; 6	AUS; 16	FRA; 7	ESP; 4	GBR; 3				5th	108
2015	Citroën Total Abu Dhabi	Citroën DS3 WRC	MON; 4	SWE; 10	MEX; 2	ARG; 2	POR; 7	ITA; 5	POL; 9	FIN; 3	GER; 7	AUS; WD	FRA; 6	ESP; 4	GBR; 7				4th	116
2016	Printsport	Citroën DS3 R3T	MON; 19																17th	8
2016	Škoda Motorsport	Škoda Fabia R5		SWE; 11	MEX	ARG	POR; 9	ITA	POL; 20	FIN; Ret		CHN; C	FRA	ESP; 9		AUS			17th	8
2016	Škoda Motorsport II	Škoda Fabia R5									GER; 8				GBR; 13				17th	8
2017	Škoda Motorsport II	Škoda Fabia R5	MON; 11							POL; 13									18th	4
2017	Škoda Motorsport	Škoda Fabia R5		SWE; 9	MEX; 10	FRA	ARG; 10	POR; 11	ITA		FIN	GER; 12	ESP	GBR; 11	AUS				18th	4
2018	Škoda Motorsport	Škoda Fabia R5	MON	SWE; 12	MEX; 7	FRA	ARG; 10	POR; 8	ITA	FIN	GER			ESP	AUS				16th	12
2018	Škoda Motorsport II	Škoda Fabia R5										TUR; Ret	GBR; 10						16th	12
2019	Ole Christian Veiby	Volkswagen Polo GTI R5	MON; 12	SWE; 9	MEX	FRA; Ret	ARG	CHL	POR; Ret	ITA; 20	FIN	GER	TUR	GBR; 35	ESP; 16	AUS; C			23rd	2
2020	Hyundai Motorsport N	Hyundai i20 R5	MON; Ret	SWE; 13	MEX; 10	EST; Ret	TUR	ITA; 12											25th	1
2020	Hyundai 2C Competition	Hyundai i20 Coupe WRC							MNZ; Ret										25th	1
2021	Hyundai Motorsport N	Hyundai i20 R5	MON	ARC; 16	CRO	POR; DNS	ITA; WD	KEN	EST	BEL	GRE	FIN	ESP						25th	4
2021	M-Sport Ford WRT	Ford Fiesta WRC												MNZ; 8					25th	4
2022	M-Sport Ford WRT	Ford Puma Rally1	MON; 5	SWE; 5	CRO; 15	POR; 19	ITA; 7	KEN; 14	EST; Ret	FIN; 7	BEL; 19	GRE; 29	NZL; Ret	ESP; Ret	JPN; 6				10th	44
2023	Toksport WRT 2	Škoda Fabia RS Rally2	MON	SWE	MEX; 6	CRO; 14	POR; 6	ITA; Ret	KEN	EST; Ret	FIN; Ret	GRE; 8	CHL; 7	EUR; 14	JPN				13th	26
2024	Toksport WRT	Škoda Fabia RS Rally2	MON	SWE	KEN; 6	CRO; 11	POR; Ret	ITA	POL; 17	LAT; 13	FIN; Ret	GRE; Ret	CHL; 10	EUR; 12	JPN; 10				18th	8
2025	Gus Greensmith	Škoda Fabia RS Rally2	MON; 12	SWE	KEN; 6	ESP	POR; 12	ITA	GRE; 7	EST	FIN; 18	PAR; 27	CHL; 26	EUR	JPN; Ret	SAU; 12			14th	14
2026	Gus Greensmith	Toyota GR Yaris Rally2	MON	SWE	KEN; 6	CRO	ESP	POR; 22	JPN	GRE; 37	EST; 20	FIN; Ret	PAR; 8	CHL; 10	ITA; 10	SAU; C			15th	14

* Season still in progress.

=== WRC-2 Results ===
Year	Entrant	Car	1	2	3	4	5	6	7	8	9	10	11	12	13	14	Pos.	Points
2016	Škoda Motorsport	Škoda Fabia R5	MON	SWE; 2	MEX	ARG	POR; 1	ITA	POL; 7	FIN; Ret	GER	CHN; C	FRA	ESP; 2		AUS	5th	85
2016	Škoda Motorsport II	Škoda Fabia R5													GBR; 2		5th	85
2017	Škoda Motorsport	Škoda Fabia R5	MON	SWE; 1	MEX; 1	FRA	ARG; 1	POR; 1	ITA		FIN	GER; 3	ESP	GBR; 1	AUS		1st	143
2017	Škoda Motorsport II	Škoda Fabia R5								POL; 2							1st	143
2018	Škoda Motorsport	Škoda Fabia R5	MON	SWE; 2	MEX; 1	FRA	ARG; 1	POR; 1	ITA	FIN	GER			ESP	AUS		2nd	111
2018	Škoda Motorsport II	Škoda Fabia R5										TUR; Ret	GBR; 2				2nd	111
2019	Ole Christian Veiby	Volkswagen Polo GTI R5	MON; 3	SWE; 1	MEX	FRA; Ret	ARG	CHL	POR; Ret	ITA; 5	FIN	GER	TUR	GBR; 11	ESP; 4	AUS; C	5th	62
2020	Hyundai Motorsport N	Hyundai i20 R5	MON; Ret	SWE; 2	MEX; 3	EST; Ret	TUR	ITA; 2	MNZ								4th	51
2021	Hyundai Motorsport N	Hyundai i20 R5	MON	ARC; 5	CRO	POR; DNS	ITA; WD	KEN	EST	BEL	GRE	FIN	ESP	MNZ			21st	13
2023	Toksport WRT 2	Škoda Fabia RS Rally2	MON	SWE	MEX; 1	CRO; 6	POR; 1	ITA; Ret	KEN	EST	FIN; Ret	GRE; 2	CHL; 2	EUR; 4	JPN		2nd	111
2024	Toksport WRT	Škoda Fabia RS Rally2	MON	SWE	KEN; 1	CRO	POR; Ret	ITA	POL; 9	LAT	FIN; Ret	GRE; Ret	CHL; 3	EUR	JPN; 4		7th	54
2025	Gus Greensmith	Škoda Fabia RS Rally2	MON	SWE	KEN; 1	ESP	POR; 3	ITA	GRE; 2	EST	FIN	PAR; 15	CHL; 13	EUR	JPN; Ret	SAU; 1	4th	82
2026	Gus Greensmith	Toyota GR Yaris Rally2	MON	SWE	KEN; 2	CRO	ESP	POR; 10	JPN	GRE; 19	EST	FIN; Ret	PAR; 2	CHL; 3	ITA; 3	SAU; C	6th	65

* Season still in progress.
