= Benito Guerra Jr. =

Mexican rally driver (born 1985)

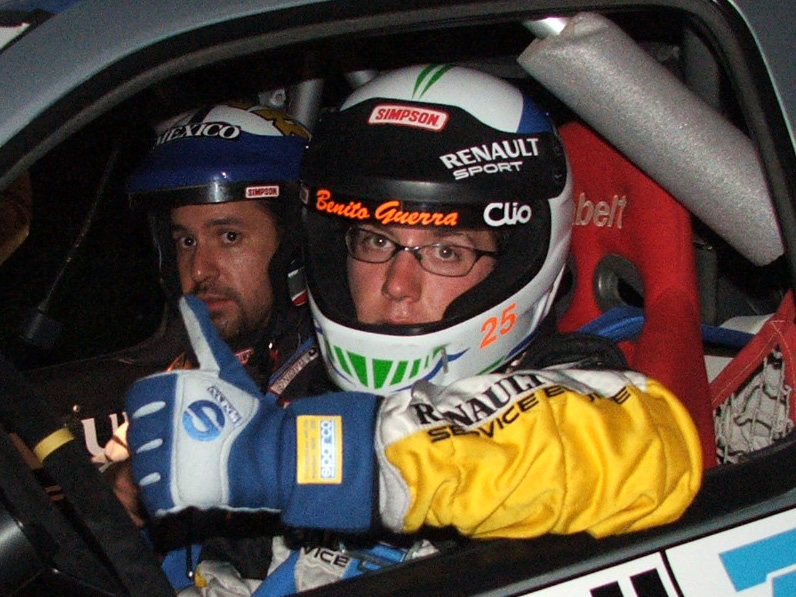
- Guerra Jr. with Javier Lozano (left), in 2005

Personal information
- Nationality: (Mexico) Mexican
- Born: 25 March 1985 (age 41)

World Rally Championship record
- Years active: 2006 – 2020, 2022
- Co-driver: (Spain) Daniel Cué (Spain) Borja Rozada
- Teams: Ralliart, Motorsport Italia
- Rallies: 44
- Championships: 0
- Rally wins: 0
- Podiums: 0
- Stage wins: 0
- Total points: 22
- First rally: 2006 Rally México
- Last rally: 2022 Rally de Portugal

Benito Iván Guerra Latapí (born 25 March 1985) is a Mexican rally driver competing for Citroën Racing, a privateer team in the FIA World Rally Championship (WRC) in 2013, with his co-driver Borja Rozada.

In 2012, Guerra won the Production World Rally Championship (PWRC) and became a World Champion.

== Personal life ==
Guerra's father is Benito Guerra Sr., a vintage racing driver like La Carrera Panamericana and Notary public in Mexico City, his mother is Mercedes Guerra (née Latapí), a CPA. Benito has a younger sister named Mercedes, a fan of motorsport.

== Career ==
=== 2006 – 2010 ===
Guerra made his World Rally Championship debut on his home event Rally Mexico in 2006, finishing the event in 26th. In 2007, he started both Rally Mexico and Rally Argentina, but retired from both with mechanical problems. He finished 14th on the 2008 Rally México, winning the Group N category. In 2009, he won the Spanish Production title, winning the Spanish gravel title outright in 2010. He finished 15th overall and fourth in PWRC on the 2010 Rally México.

=== 2011 ===
Guerra began 2011 by finishing 11th overall on Rally Mexico, and then committed to a PWRC programme. He finished fourth in PWRC in Portugal, fourth in Australia and third in Spain. At the end of the season, Guerra finished sixth overall, scoring 47 WRC points.

=== 2012 ===
Guerra and his co-driver Borja Rozada, won in México, Argentina and España rallies, plus a second place in Germany, thereby the Mexican-Spaniard duo got the PWRC world championship with 109 points, over the Argentinian team Marcos Ligato and Rubén García (88 points). So, Guerra became the first Mexican rally driver to win a World Championship, and the second Mexican to earn a title in the world of motorsport. Until then, Pedro Rodríguez was the only one who had achieved in 1970 and 1971 at the World Sportscar Championship with JW-Porsche.

Race of Champions

That same year, Guerra was invited to participate in the 25th edition of the Race of Champions, from 14 to 16 December in Bangkok along with racing legends like Michael Schumacher and Sebastian Vettel. His teammate of Team Americas was the Texan Ryan Hunter-Reay, 2012 IndyCar Series champion.

Guerra considered it to be a “a great end-of-season challenge", stating that he was extremely excited.

In the Nations Cup race, Guerra beat Jorge Lorenzo and the ROC Champion of Champions of 2011, Sébastien Ogier but was defeated by Andy Priaulx, due to a penalty. Therefore, the Team Americas was eliminated in the first round because Hunter-Reay was defeated in two of his three rounds.

In the Champion of Champions event, Guerra was eliminated in the first round. At the end, the overall winner of the ROC 2012 was F1 driver Romain Grosjean.

=== 2013 ===
Due to lack of sponsorship, Guerra did not participate in Monaco and Sweden rallies, but in his country México, he started with Citroën Racing, a privateer team in the WRC in 2013, with his co-driver Borja Rozada.

On his very first race in the WRC, as a rookie in the category, Guerra entered in the top-ten of the Mexican rally, thus he earned his first four points for the championship. ending at eighth overall position behind the winner Sébastien Ogier for 12:49.8 minutes.

=== 2019 ===
In the 29th edition of the Race of Champions, held at Foro Sol in Mexico City, Guerra defeated French driver Loïc Duval, winner of 2013 24 Hours of Le Mans and 2013 WEC, in the final. On his way to the final match against Duval, Guerra defeated drivers like Sebastian Vettel, Pierre Gasly, Daniel Suárez, Esteban Gutiérrez, among others.

== Complete World Rally Championship results ==
=== WRC results ===
| Year | Entrant | Car | 1 | 2 | 3 | 4 | 5 | 6 | 7 | 8 | 9 | 10 | 11 | 12 | 13 | 14 | 15 | 16 | WDC | Points |
|---|---|---|---|---|---|---|---|---|---|---|---|---|---|---|---|---|---|---|---|---|
| 2006 | Benito Guerra | Mitsubishi Lancer Evo VIII | MON | SWE | MEX; 26 | ESP | FRA | ARG | ITA | GRE | GER | FIN | JPN | CYP | TUR | AUS | NZL | GBR | NC | 0 |
| 2007 | Benito Guerra | Mitsubishi Lancer Evo VIII | MON | SWE | NOR | MEX; Ret | POR | ARG; Ret | ITA | GRE | FIN | GER | NZL | ESP | | | | | NC | 0 |
| 2008 | Benito Guerra | Mitsubishi Lancer Evo VIII | MON | SWE | MEX; 14 | ARG | JOR | ITA | GRE | TUR | FIN | GER | NZL | ESP | FRA | JPN | GBR | | NC | 0 |
| 2009 | RMC Motorsport | Mitsubishi Lancer Evo VIII | IRE | NOR | CYP | POR | | ITA | GRE | POL | FIN | AUS | ESP; 30 | GBR | | | | | NC | 0 |
| 2010 | Benito Guerra | Mitsubishi Lancer Evo IX | SWE | MEX; 15 | JOR | TUR | NZL | POR | BUL | FIN | GER | JPN | FRA | ESP | GBR | | | | NC | 0 |
| 2011 | Ralliart | Mitsubishi Lancer Evo X | SWE | MEX; 11 | POR; 18 | JOR | ITA | ARG; 15 | GRE | FIN; Ret | GER | | FRA | ESP; 24 | GBR; Ret | | | | 26th | 2 |
| 2011 | Ralliart | Mitsubishi Lancer Evo IX | | | | | | | | | | AUS; 9 | | | | | | | 26th | 2 |
| 2012 | Ralliart | Mitsubishi Lancer Evo X | MON | SWE | MEX; 11 | POR | ARG; 11 | GRE; 19 | NZL | FIN | GER; 16 | GBR | FRA | ITA; 24 | ESP; 18 | | | | NC | 0 |
| 2013 | Benito Guerra Jr. | Citroën DS3 WRC | MON | SWE | MEX; 8 | POR | ARG | GRE | ITA | FIN | GER | AUS | FRA | | | | | | 24th | 4 |
| 2013 | Benito Guerra Jr. | Mitsubishi Lancer Evo X | | | | | | | | | | | | ESP; 14 | GBR | | | | 24th | 4 |
| 2014 | M-Sport World Rally Team | Ford Fiesta RS WRC | MON | SWE | MEX; 6 | POR | ARG | ITA | POL | FIN | GER | AUS | FRA | | | | | | 17th | 8 |
| 2014 | BAS Motorsport | Mitsubishi Lancer Evo X | | | | | | | | | | | | ESP; 18 | GBR | | | | 17th | 8 |
| 2015 | Benito Guerra Jr. | Ford Fiesta RS WRC | MON | SWE | MEX; 12 | ARG | POR | ITA | POL | FIN | GER | AUS | FRA | ESP | GBR | | | | NC | 0 |
| 2016 | Benito Guerra Jr. | Ford Fiesta RS WRC | MON | SWE | MEX; 13 | ARG | POR | ITA | POL | FIN | GER | CHN; C | FRA | ESP | GBR | AUS | | | NC | 0 |
| 2017 | Motorsport Italia | Škoda Fabia R5 | MON | SWE | MEX; 12 | FRA | ARG; 12 | POR; 32 | ITA | POL; 17 | FIN | GER; 18 | ESP; 12 | GBR; WD | AUS | | | | NC | 0 |
| 2018 | Motorsport Italia | Škoda Fabia R5 | MON | SWE | MEX; DNS | FRA | ARG | POR; 15 | ITA; 20 | FIN; 18 | GER; 19 | TUR | GBR | ESP; WD | AUS | | | | NC | 0 |
| 2019 | Benito Guerra | Škoda Fabia R5 | MON | SWE | MEX; 6 | FRA | ARG; 12 | CHL; 16 | POR; 14 | ITA | FIN | GER | TUR | | | | | | 16th | 8 |
| 2019 | Benito Guerra | Škoda Fabia R5 Evo | | | | | | | | | | | | GBR; 20 | ESP; Ret | AUS; C | | | 16th | 8 |
| 2020 | Benito Guerra | Škoda Fabia R5 | MON | SWE | MEX; 20 | EST | TUR | ITA | MNZ | | | | | | | | | | NC | 0 |
| 2022 | Benito Guerra | Škoda Fabia Rally2 evo | MON | SWE | CRO; 23 | POR; Ret | ITA | KEN | EST | FIN | BEL | GRE | NZL | ESP | JPN | | | | NC | 0 |

=== PWRC results ===
| Year | Entrant | Car | 1 | 2 | 3 | 4 | 5 | 6 | 7 | 8 | 9 | PWRC | Points |
|---|---|---|---|---|---|---|---|---|---|---|---|---|---|
| 2010 | Benito Guerra | Mitsubishi Lancer Evo IX | SWE | MEX; 5 | JOR | NZL | FIN | GER | JPN | FRA | GBR | 18th | 12 |
| 2011 | Ralliart | Mitsubishi Lancer Evo X | SWE | POR; 4 | ARG; 6 | FIN; Ret | | ESP; 3 | GBR; Ret | | | 6th | 47 |
| 2011 | Ralliart | Mitsubishi Lancer Evo IX | | | | | AUS; 4 | | | | | 6th | 47 |
| 2012 | Ralliart | Mitsubishi Lancer Evo X | MON | MEX; 1 | ARG; 1 | GRE; 4 | NZL | GER; 2 | ITA; 6 | ESP; 1 | | 1st | 109 |

=== WRC-2 results ===
| Year | Entrant | Car | 1 | 2 | 3 | 4 | 5 | 6 | 7 | 8 | 9 | 10 | 11 | 12 | 13 | 14 | WRC-2 | Points |
|---|---|---|---|---|---|---|---|---|---|---|---|---|---|---|---|---|---|---|
| 2014 | BAS Motorsport | Mitsubishi Lancer Evo X | MON | SWE | MEX | POR | ARG | ITA | POL | FIN | GER | AUS | FRA | ESP; 4 | GBR | | 28th | 12 |
| 2017 | Motorsport Italia | Škoda Fabia R5 | MON | SWE | MEX; 3 | FRA | ARG; 3 | POR; 11 | ITA | POL; 4 | FIN | GER; 9 | ESP; 3 | GBR; WD | AUS | | 6th | 59 |
| 2018 | Motorsport Italia | Škoda Fabia R5 | MON | SWE | MEX; DNS | FRA | ARG | POR; 7 | ITA; 6 | FIN; 6 | GER; 9 | TUR | GBR | ESP; WD | AUS | | 19th | 24 |
| 2019 | Benito Guerra | Škoda Fabia R5 | MON | SWE | MEX; 1 | FRA | ARG; 2 | CHL; 2 | POR; 6 | ITA | FIN | GER | TUR | | | | 3rd | 75 |
| 2019 | Benito Guerra | Škoda Fabia R5 Evo | | | | | | | | | | | | GBR; 7 | ESP; Ret | AUS; C | 3rd | 75 |
| 2022 | Benito Guerra | Škoda Fabia Rally2 evo | MON | SWE | CRO; 13 | POR; Ret | ITA | KEN | EST | FIN | BEL | GRE | NZL | ESP | JPN | | NC | 0 |

=== WRC-3 results ===
| Year | Entrant | Car | 1 | 2 | 3 | 4 | 5 | 6 | 7 | Pos. | Points |
|---|---|---|---|---|---|---|---|---|---|---|---|
| 2020 | Benito Guerra | Škoda Fabia R5 | MON | SWE | MEX; 5 | EST | TUR | ITA | MNZ | 19th | 10 |

Sporting positions
| Preceded by Hayden Paddon | Production World Rally Championship champion 2012 | Succeeded by Sébastien Chardonnet (WRC-3) |
| Preceded by David Coulthard | Race of Champions; Champion of Champions; 2019 | Succeeded by Sébastien Loeb (2022) |
