= 2019 Rally Italia Sardegna =

16th edition of Rally Italia Sardegna

2019 Rally Italia Sardegna: 16. Rally Italia Sardegna
Round 8 of 14 in the 2019 World Rally Championship
← Previous event	Next event →
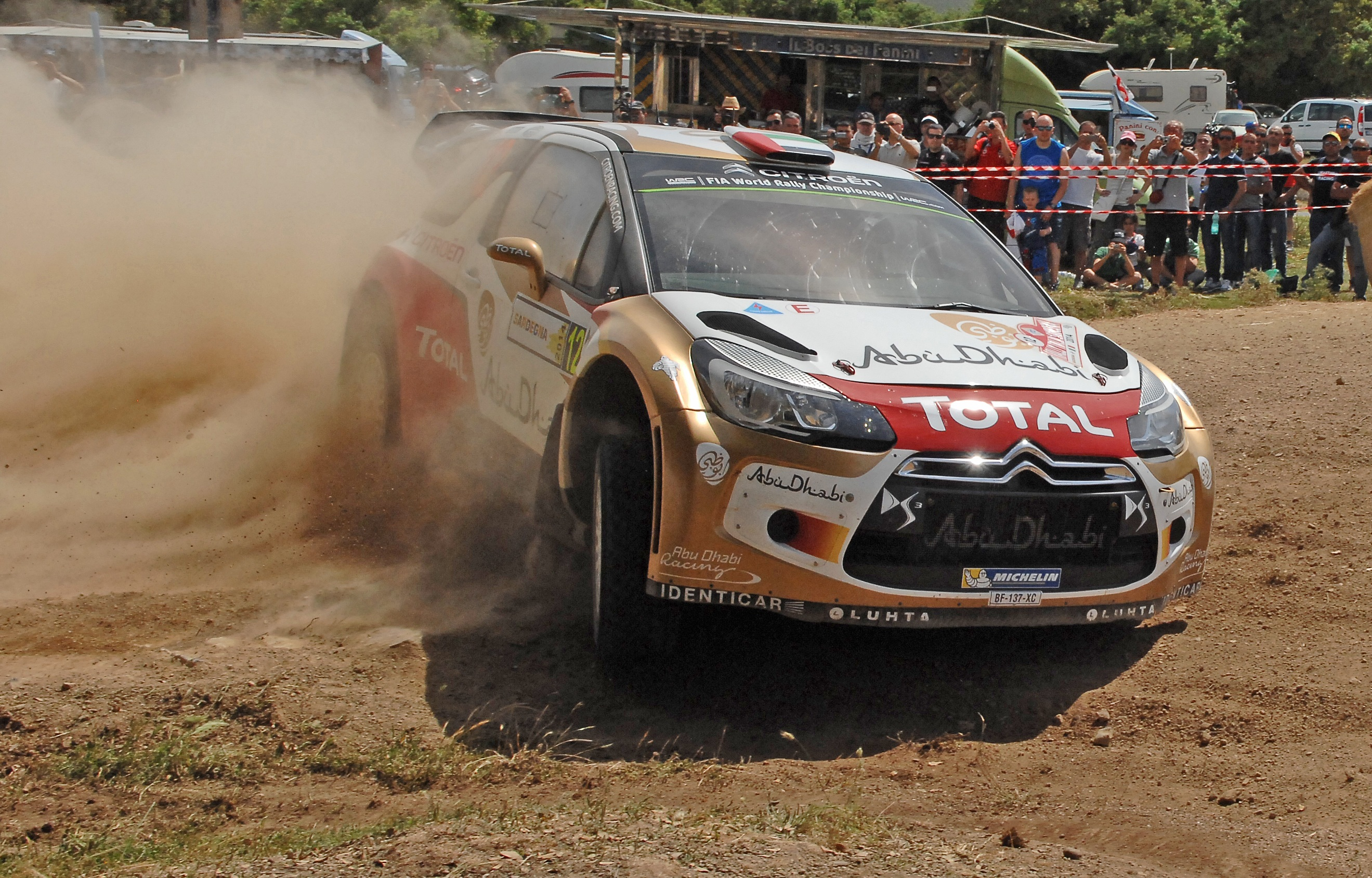
- Rally Sardegna features with fast and narrow stages, with intense heat testing tyre limits.
- Host country: Italy
- Rally base: Alghero, Sardinia
- Dates run: 13 – 16 June 2019
- Start location: Ittiri motocross track, Alghero
- Finish location: Argentiera, Alghero
- Stages: 19 (310.52 km; 192.95 miles)
- Stage surface: Gravel
- Transport distance: 1,073.12 km (666.81 miles)
- Overall distance: 1,383.64 km (859.75 miles)

Statistics
- Crews registered: 89
- Crews: 88 at start, 49 at finish

Overall results
- Overall winner: (Spain) Dani Sordo (Spain) Carlos del Barrio (South Korea) Hyundai Shell Mobis WRT; 3:32:27.2
- Power Stage winner: (Norway) Andreas Mikkelsen (Norway) Anders Jæger-Amland (South Korea) Hyundai Shell Mobis WRT

Support category results
- WRC-2 winner: (France) Pierre-Louis Loubet (France) Vincent Landais (France) Pierre-Louis Loubet; 3:43:40.2
- J-WRC winner: (Spain) Jan Solans (Spain) Mauro Barreiro (Spain) Rally Team Spain; 4:02:36.2

The 2019 Rally Italia Sardegna (also known as Rally Italia Sardegna 2019) was a motor racing event for rally cars that was held over four days between 13 and 16 June 2019. It marked the sixteenth running of Rally Italia Sardegna and was the eighth round of the 2019 World Rally Championship, World Rally Championship-2 and the newly created WRC-2 Pro class. It was also the third round of the Junior World Rally Championship. The 2019 event was based in Alghero in Sardinia, and was contested over nineteen special stages with a total a competitive distance of 310.52 km (192.95 mi).

Thierry Neuville and Nicolas Gilsoul were the defending rally winners. Their team, Hyundai Shell Mobis WRT, were the defending manufacturers' winners. Jan Kopecký and Pavel Dresler were the defending winners in the World Rally Championship-2 category, but they did not defend their titles as they participated in the newly created WRC-2 Pro class.

Dani Sordo and Carlos del Barrio won their second career victory. Their team, Hyundai Shell Mobis WRT, successfully defended their titles. The Škoda Motorsport crew of Kalle Rovanperä and Jonne Halttunen took hat-trick in the WRC-2 Pro category, finishing first in the combined WRC-2 category, while the French crew of Pierre-Louis Loubet and Vincent Landais won the wider WRC-2 class. The third round of the J-WRC championship was taken by the Rally Team Spain crew of Jan Solans and Mauro Barreiro.

== Background ==
=== Championship standings prior to the event ===
Defending world champions Sébastien Ogier and Julien Ingrassia led both the drivers' and co-drivers' championships with a two-point ahead of Ott Tänak and Martin Järveoja. Thierry Neuville and Nicolas Gilsoul were third, a further ten points behind. In the World Rally Championship for Manufacturers, Hyundai Shell Mobis WRT held a twenty-point lead over Toyota Gazoo Racing WRT.

In the World Rally Championship-2 Pro standings, Kalle Rovanperä and Jonne Halttunen held a three-point lead ahead of Mads Østberg and Torstein Eriksen in the drivers' and co-drivers' standings respectively. Łukasz Pieniążek and Elliott Edmondson were third, nine and ten points further back respectively. In the manufacturers' championship, M-Sport Ford WRT led Škoda Motorsport by thirty-one points, with Citroën Total thirty-three points further behind in third.

In the World Rally Championship-2 standings, Benito Guerra and Jaime Zapata led the drivers' and co-drivers' standings by twenty-two points respectively. Takamoto Katsuta and Daniel Barritt were second, following by Ole Christian Veiby and Jonas Andersson in third.

In the Junior-World Rally Championship standings, Tom Kristensson and Henrik Appelskog led Jan Solans and Mauro Barreiro by thirteen points in the drivers' and co-drivers' standings respectively, with Dennis Rådström and Johan Johansson two points further behind in third in their own standings. In the Nations' standings, Sweden were first, thirteen points clear of Spain, with Estonia two points further behind in third.

=== Entry list ===
The following crews entered into the rally. The event opened to crews competing in the World Rally Championship, World Rally Championship-2, WRC-2 Pro, Junior World Rally Championship, Italian national championship and privateer entries not registered to score points in any championship. A total of ninety-four entries were received, with twelve crews entered with World Rally Cars and fifteen entered the World Rally Championship-2. Five crews were nominated to score points in the Pro class. A further eleven entries were received for the Junior World Rally Championship.

No.	Driver	Co-Driver	Entrant	Car	Tyre
World Rally Car entries
1	(France) Sébastien Ogier	(France) Julien Ingrassia	(France) Citroën Total WRT	Citroën C3 WRC	MI
3	(Finland) Teemu Suninen	(Finland) Jarmo Lehtinen	(United Kingdom) M-Sport Ford WRT	Ford Fiesta WRC	MI
4	(Finland) Esapekka Lappi	(Finland) Janne Ferm	(France) Citroën Total WRT	Citroën C3 WRC	MI
5	(United Kingdom) Kris Meeke	(United Kingdom) Sebastian Marshall	(Japan) Toyota Gazoo Racing WRT	Toyota Yaris WRC	MI
6	(Spain) Dani Sordo	(Spain) Carlos del Barrio	(South Korea) Hyundai Shell Mobis WRT	Hyundai i20 Coupe WRC	MI
8	(Estonia) Ott Tänak	(Estonia) Martin Järveoja	(Japan) Toyota Gazoo Racing WRT	Toyota Yaris WRC	MI
10	(Finland) Jari-Matti Latvala	(Finland) Miikka Anttila	(Japan) Toyota Gazoo Racing WRT	Toyota Yaris WRC	MI
11	(Belgium) Thierry Neuville	(Belgium) Nicolas Gilsoul	(South Korea) Hyundai Shell Mobis WRT	Hyundai i20 Coupe WRC	MI
26	(Czech Republic) Martin Prokop	(Czech Republic) Jan Tománek	(Czech Republic) MP-Sports	Ford Fiesta RS WRC	MI
33	(United Kingdom) Elfyn Evans	(United Kingdom) Scott Martin	(United Kingdom) M-Sport Ford WRT	Ford Fiesta WRC	MI
69	(Finland) Juho Hänninen	(Finland) Tomi Tuominen	(Finland) Tommi Mäkinen Racing	Toyota Yaris WRC	MI
89	(Norway) Andreas Mikkelsen	(Norway) Anders Jæger-Amland	(South Korea) Hyundai Shell Mobis WRT	Hyundai i20 Coupe WRC	MI
World Rally Championship-2 Pro entries
21	(Norway) Mads Østberg	(Norway) Torstein Eriksen	(France) Citroën Total (Note: Entry run in conjunction with DG Sport.)	Citroën C3 R5	MI
22	(Finland) Kalle Rovanperä	(Finland) Jonne Halttunen	(Czech Republic) Škoda Motorsport	Škoda Fabia R5 Evo	MI
23	(Czech Republic) Jan Kopecký	(Czech Republic) Pavel Dresler	(Czech Republic) Škoda Motorsport	Škoda Fabia R5 Evo	MI
24	(United Kingdom) Gus Greensmith	(United Kingdom) Elliott Edmondson	(United Kingdom) M-Sport Ford WRT	Ford Fiesta R5	MI
World Rally Championship-2 entries
41	(Japan) Takamoto Katsuta	(United Kingdom) Daniel Barritt	(Japan) Takamoto Katsuta (Note: Entry operated by Tommi Mäkinen Racing.)	Ford Fiesta R5	P
42	(Norway) Ole Christian Veiby	(Sweden) Jonas Andersson	(Norway) Ole Christian Veiby (Note: Entry operated by Volkswagen Dealerteam Bauhaus.)	Volkswagen Polo GTI R5	MI
43	(Russia) Nikolay Gryazin	(Russia) Yaroslav Fedorov	(Russia) Nikolay Gryazin (Note: Entry operated by Sports Racing Technologies.)	Škoda Fabia R5	MI
44	(Italy) Fabio Andolfi	(Italy) Simone Scattolin	(Italy) Fabio Andolfi (Note: Entry operated by ACI Team Italia WRC.)	Škoda Fabia R5	P
45	(Bolivia) Marco Bulacia Wilkinson	(Argentina) Fabian Cretu	(Bolivia) Marco Bulacia Wilkinson (Note: Entry operated by VIALCO Racing.)	Škoda Fabia R5	MI
46	(Poland) Kajetan Kajetanowicz	(Poland) Maciej Szczepaniak	(Poland) Kajetan Kajetanowicz (Note: Entry operated by Lotos Dynamic Rally Team.)	Škoda Fabia R5	P
48	(Belgium) Guillaume De Mevius	(Belgium) Martijn Wydaeghe	(Belgium) Guillaume De Mevius (Note: Entry operated by DG Sport.)	Citroën C3 R5	MI
49	(France) Pierre-Louis Loubet	(France) Vincent Landais	(France) Pierre-Louis Loubet (Note: Entry operated by Qatar 2C World Rally Team.)	Škoda Fabia R5	MI
50	(Romania) Simone Tempestini	(Romania) Sergiu Itu	(Romania) Simone Tempestini (Note: Entry operated by Friulmotor Rally Team.)	Hyundai i20 R5	P
51	(Spain) Nil Solans	(Spain) Marc Martí	(Spain) Nil Solans (Note: Entry operated by Rally Team Spain.)	Ford Fiesta R5	P
Junior World Rally Championship entries
71	(Sweden) Tom Kristensson	(Sweden) Henrik Appelskog	(Sweden) Tom Kristensson	Ford Fiesta R2	P
72	(Spain) Jan Solans	(Spain) Mauro Barreiro	Rally Team Spain	Ford Fiesta R2	P
73	(Sweden) Dennis Rådström	(Sweden) Johan Johansson	(Sweden) Dennis Rådström	Ford Fiesta R2	P
74	(Germany) Julius Tannert	(Austria) Jürgen Heigl	(Germany) ADAC Sachsen	Ford Fiesta R2	P
75	(United Kingdom) Tom Williams	(United Kingdom) Phil Hall	(United Kingdom) Tom Williams	Ford Fiesta R2	P
76	(Latvia) Mārtiņš Sesks	(Latvia) Krišjānis Caune	(Latvia) LMT Autosporta Akadēmija	Ford Fiesta R2	P
77	(United States) Sean Johnston	(United States) Alex Kihurani	(United States) Sean Johnston	Ford Fiesta R2	P
78	(Italy) Enrico Oldrati	(Italy) Elia De Guio	(Italy) Enrico Oldrati	Ford Fiesta R2	P
79	(Romania) Raul Badiu	(Romania) Gabriel Lazăr	(Romania) Raul Badiu	Ford Fiesta R2	P
80	(Paraguay) Fabrizio Zaldívar	(Argentina) Fernando Mussano	(Paraguay) Fabrizio Zaldívar	Ford Fiesta R2	P
81	(Germany) Nico Knacker	(Germany) Tobias Braun	(Germany) ADAC Weiser-Ems	Ford Fiesta R2	P
Other Major Entries
96	(Germany) Albert von Thurn und Taxis	(Austria) Bernhard Ettel	(Germany) Albert von Thurn und Taxis	Škoda Fabia R5	P
100	(Italy) Giandomenico Basso	(Italy) Lorenzo Granai	(Italy) LORAN s.r.l	Škoda Fabia R5	P
101	(Italy) Luca Rossetti	(Italy) Eleonora Mori	(Italy) F.P.F. Sport	Citroën C3 R5	P
134	(France) Adrien Fourmaux	(Belgium) Renaud Jamoul	(France) Adrien Fourmaux	Ford Fiesta R2	MI

=== Route ===
The Ittiri Arena stage will be removed from the itinerary as well as some slight length-adjustments to selected stages.

==== Itinerary ====
All dates and times are CEST (UTC+2).

Date	Time	No.	Stage name	Distance
13 June	09:00	—	Olmedo [Shakedown]	3.92 km
Leg 1 — 124.20 km
13 June	17:00	SS1	Ittiri Arena Show	2.00 km
14 June	8:03	SS2	Tula 1	22.25 km
14 June	9:20	SS3	Castelsardo 1	14.72 km
14 June	10:09	SS4	Tergu — Osilo 1	14.14 km
14 June	11:18	SS5	Monte Baranta 1	10.99 km
14 June	14:42	SS6	Tula 2	22.25 km
14 June	15:59	SS7	Castelsardo 2	14.72 km
14 June	16:48	SS8	Tergu — Osilo 2	14.14 km
14 June	18:04	SS9	Monte Baranta 2	10.99 km
Leg 2 — 142.42 km
15 June	8:08	SS10	Monte Lerno 1	14.97 km
15 June	9:11	SS11	Monti di Alà 1	28.21 km
15 June	10:03	SS12	Coiluna — Loelle 1	28.03 km
15 June	16:08	SS13	Monte Lerno 2	14.97 km
15 June	17:11	SS14	Monti di Alà 2	28.21 km
15 June	18:03	SS15	Coiluna — Loelle 2	28.03 km
Leg 3 — 41.90 km
16 June	8:15	SS16	Cala Flumini 1	14.06 km
16 June	9:08	SS17	Sassari — Argentiera 1	6.89 km
16 June	11:15	SS18	Cala Flumini 2	14.06 km
16 June	12:08	SS19	Sassari — Argentiera 2 [Power Stage]	6.89 km

== Report ==
=== World Rally Cars ===
The first leg saw defending world champion Sébastien Ogier, who was the road-cleaner in Sardinia, caught out after hitting a huge rock in the morning loop. Ogier's Citroën C3 sustained serious suspension damage, forcing him and co-driver Julien Ingrassia to retire from the stage. Teemu Suninen took an early lead until a spin handed the lead to Jari-Matti Latvala, who rolled his Yaris in the afternoon loop. Things went from bad to worse as the Finn went off the road in the final stage of the leg. Thierry Neuville also hit trouble as his i20 slid nose-first into a ditch, with the Hyundai's radiator being pierced in the ordeal. Eventually, Dani Sordo became the overnight leader.

On day two, with a much better road position, Ott Tänak took over the rally — he dominated the day and won all six stages, turning a ten-second deficit to a twenty-five-second lead. However, his teammate Kris Meeke had to change a punctured tyre in the final test, which dropped him down from fifth to eighth.

Things went against Tänak's favour in the power stage, however, when a late power steering failure deprived the Estonian of a third consecutive rally win, handing the victory to Sordo; his first rally win since the 2013 Rallye Deutschland.

==== Classification ====
Position		No.	Driver	Co-driver	Entrant	Car	Time	Difference	Points	
Event	Class	No.	Driver	Co-driver	Entrant	Car	Time	Difference	Event	Stage
1	1	6	Dani Sordo	Carlos del Barrio	Hyundai Shell Mobis WRT	Hyundai i20 Coupe WRC	3:32:27.2	0.0	25	0
2	2	3	Teemu Suninen	Marko Salminen	M-Sport Ford WRT	Ford Fiesta WRC	3:32:40.9	+13.7	18	0
3	3	89	Andreas Mikkelsen	Anders Jæger-Amland	Hyundai Shell Mobis WRT	Hyundai i20 Coupe WRC	3:32:59.8	+32.6	15	5
4	4	33	Elfyn Evans	Scott Martin	M-Sport Ford WRT	Ford Fiesta WRC	3:33:00.7	+33.5	12	1
5	5	8	Ott Tänak	Martin Järveoja	Toyota Gazoo Racing WRT	Toyota Yaris WRC	3:33:57.3	+1:30.1	10	0
6	6	11	Thierry Neuville	Nicolas Gilsoul	Hyundai Shell Mobis WRT	Hyundai i20 Coupe WRC	3:34:43.9	+2:16.7	8	3
7	7	4	Esapekka Lappi	Janne Ferm	Citroën Total WRT	Citroën C3 WRC	3:35:26.8	+2:59.6	6	0
8	8	5	Kris Meeke	Sebastian Marshall	Toyota Gazoo Racing WRT	Toyota Yaris WRC	3:37:07.3	+4:40.1	4	0
19	9	10	Jari-Matti Latvala	Miikka Anttila	Toyota Gazoo Racing WRT	Toyota Yaris WRC	3:53:03.2	+20:36.0	0	2
41	10	1	Sébastien Ogier	Julien Ingrassia	Citroën Total WRT	Citroën C3 WRC	4:55:25.7	+1:22:58.5	0	4
Retired SS19		69	Juho Hänninen	Tomi Tuominen	Tommi Mäkinen Racing	Toyota Yaris WRC	Withdrawn		0	0

==== Special stages ====
Date	No.	Stage name	Distance	Winners	Car	Time	Class leaders
13 June	—	Olmedo [Shakedown]	3.92 km	Ogier / Ingrassia	Citroën C3 WRC	3:00.0	—N/a
13 June	SS1	Ittiri Arena Show	2.00 km	Ogier / Ingrassia	Citroën C3 WRC	2:00.7	Ogier / Ingrassia
14 June	SS2	Tula 1	22.25 km	Suninen / Lehtinen	Ford Fiesta WRC	18:45.0	Suninen / Lehtinen
14 June	SS3	Castelsardo 1	14.72 km	Suninen / Lehtinen	Ford Fiesta WRC	11:05.4	Suninen / Lehtinen
14 June	SS4	Tergu — Osilo 1	14.14 km	Tänak / Järveoja	Toyota Yaris WRC	9:12.7	Latvala / Anttila
14 June	SS5	Monte Baranta 1	10.99 km	Lappi / Ferm	Citroën C3 WRC	8:17.4	Latvala / Anttila
14 June	SS6	Tula 2	22.25 km	Suninen / Lehtinen	Ford Fiesta WRC	18:24.9	Sordo / del Barrio; Tänak / Järveoja
14 June	SS7	Castelsardo 2	14.72 km	Neuville / Gilsoul	Hyundai i20 Coupe WRC	10:52.8	Sordo / del Barrio; Tänak / Järveoja
14 June	SS8	Tergu — Osilo 2	14.14 km	Sordo / del Barrio	Hyundai i20 Coupe WRC	8:53.2	Sordo / del Barrio
14 June	SS9	Monte Baranta 2	10.99 km	Mikkelsen / Jæger-Amland	Hyundai i20 Coupe WRC	7:58.4	Sordo / del Barrio
15 June	SS10	Monte Lerno 1	14.97 km	Tänak / Järveoja	Toyota Yaris WRC	9:18.3	Sordo / del Barrio
15 June	SS11	Monti di Alà 1	28.21 km	Tänak / Järveoja	Toyota Yaris WRC	16:58.3	Sordo / del Barrio
15 June	SS12	Coiluna — Loelle 1	28.03 km	Tänak / Järveoja	Toyota Yaris WRC	18:10.6	Tänak / Järveoja
15 June	SS13	Monte Lerno 2	14.97 km	Tänak / Järveoja	Toyota Yaris WRC	9:09.6	Tänak / Järveoja
15 June	SS14	Monti di Alà 2	28.21 km	Tänak / Järveoja	Toyota Yaris WRC	16:31.8	Tänak / Järveoja
15 June	SS15	Coiluna — Loelle 2	28.03 km	Tänak / Järveoja	Toyota Yaris WRC	17:49.0	Tänak / Järveoja
16 June	SS16	Cala Flumini 1	14.06 km	Mikkelsen / Jæger-Amland	Hyundai i20 Coupe WRC	8:48.4	Tänak / Järveoja
16 June	SS17	Sassari — Argentiera 1	6.89 km	Mikkelsen / Jæger-Amland	Hyundai i20 Coupe WRC	4:59.0	Tänak / Järveoja
16 June	SS18	Cala Flumini 2	14.06 km	Mikkelsen / Jæger-Amland	Hyundai i20 Coupe WRC	8:34.8	Tänak / Järveoja
16 June	SS19	Sassari — Argentiera 2 [Power Stage]	6.89 km	Mikkelsen / Jæger-Amland	Hyundai i20 Coupe WRC	4:54.0	Sordo / del Barrio

==== Championship standings ====
Pos.	Drivers' championships			Co-drivers' championships			Manufacturers' championships		
Pos.	Move	Driver	Points	Move	Co-driver	Points	Move	Manufacturer	Points
1	1	Ott Tänak	150	1	Martin Järveoja	150		Hyundai Shell Mobis WRT	242
2	1	Sébastien Ogier	146	1	Julien Ingrassia	146		Toyota Gazoo Racing WRT	198
3		Thierry Neuville	143		Nicolas Gilsoul	143		Citroën Total WRT	170
4		Elfyn Evans	78		Scott Martin	78		M-Sport Ford WRT	152
5	1	Teemu Suninen	62		Sebastian Marshall	60			

=== World Rally Championship-2 Pro ===
Mads Østberg was very likely to lead the category, but he lost almost eleven minutes adrift after hitting a stone in the opening stage, which meant Kalle Rovanperä became the leader. Gus Greensmith retired from the day due to plunging down a bank. Although he restarted on Saturday, a suspension failure forced him to stop again. Eventually, Rovanperä won the category as well as played a hat-trick.

==== Classification ====
Position		No.	Driver	Co-driver	Entrant	Car	Time	Difference	Points	
Event	Class	No.	Driver	Co-driver	Entrant	Car	Time	Difference	Class	Event
9	1	22	Kalle Rovanperä	Jonne Halttunen	Škoda Motorsport	Škoda Fabia R5 Evo	3:40:51.8	0.0	**25**	**2**
10	2	24	Jan Kopecký	Pavel Dresler	Škoda Motorsport	Škoda Fabia R5 Evo	3:41:16.4	+24.6	**18**	**1**
18	3	21	Mads Østberg	Torstein Eriksen	Citroën Total	Citroën C3 R5	3:49:50.4	+8:58.6	**15**	**0**
42	4	24	Gus Greensmith	Elliott Edmondson	M-Sport Ford WRT	Ford Fiesta R5	4:58:02.8	+1:17:11.0	**12**	**0**

==== Special stages ====
Results in bold denote first in the RC2 class, the class which both the WRC-2 Pro and WRC-2 championships run to.

Date	No.	Stage name	Distance	Winners	Car	Time	Class leaders
13 June	—	Olmedo [Shakedown]	3.92 km	**Rovanperä / Halttunen**	Škoda Fabia R5 Evo	3:07.8	—N/a
13 June	SS1	Ittiri Arena Show	2.00 km	Rovanperä / Halttunen	Škoda Fabia R5 Evo	2:06.3	Rovanperä / Halttunen
14 June	SS2	Tula 1	22.25 km	**Rovanperä / Halttunen**	Škoda Fabia R5 Evo	19:26.4	Rovanperä / Halttunen
14 June	SS3	Castelsardo 1	14.72 km	Østberg / Eriksen	Citroën C3 R5	11:29.6	Rovanperä / Halttunen
14 June	SS4	Tergu — Osilo 1	14.14 km	Østberg / Eriksen (Note: The winner of SS4 in the RC2 class was the non-championship crew of Stéphane Consani and Thibault de la Haye, where they set 9:30.0.)	Citroën C3 R5	9:31.9	Kopecký / Dresler
14 June	SS5	Monte Baranta 1	10.99 km	**Østberg / Eriksen**	Citroën C3 R5	8:26.0	Kopecký / Dresler
14 June	SS6	Tula 2	22.25 km	**Rovanperä / Halttunen**	Škoda Fabia R5 Evo	18:58.6	Rovanperä / Halttunen
14 June	SS7	Castelsardo 2	14.72 km	Stage interrupted (Note: The stage was interrupted following a medical emergency in the stage involving a spectator.)			
14 June	SS8	Tergu — Osilo 2	14.14 km	Østberg / Eriksen	Citroën C3 R5	9:14.4	Rovanperä / Halttunen
14 June	SS9	Monte Baranta 2	10.99 km	**Østberg / Eriksen**	Citroën C3 R5	8:08.1	Rovanperä / Halttunen
15 June	SS10	Monte Lerno 1	14.97 km	**Østberg / Eriksen**	Citroën C3 R5	9:39.5	Rovanperä / Halttunen
15 June	SS11	Monti di Alà 1	28.21 km	**Østberg / Eriksen**	Citroën C3 R5	17:36.1	Rovanperä / Halttunen
15 June	SS12	Coiluna — Loelle 1	28.03 km	**Østberg / Eriksen**	Citroën C3 R5	18:54.8	Rovanperä / Halttunen
15 June	SS13	Monte Lerno 2	14.97 km	**Østberg / Eriksen**	Citroën C3 R5	9:36.9	Rovanperä / Halttunen
15 June	SS14	Monti di Alà 2	28.21 km	**Østberg / Eriksen**	Citroën C3 R5	17:20.9	Rovanperä / Halttunen
15 June	SS15	Coiluna — Loelle 2	28.03 km	**Østberg / Eriksen**	Citroën C3 R5	18:31.9	Rovanperä / Halttunen
16 June	SS16	Cala Flumini 1	14.06 km	**Østberg / Eriksen**	Citroën C3 R5	9:08.5	Rovanperä / Halttunen
16 June	SS17	Sassari — Argentiera 1	6.89 km	**Østberg / Eriksen**	Citroën C3 R5	5:12.9	Rovanperä / Halttunen
16 June	SS18	Cala Flumini 2	14.06 km	**Østberg / Eriksen**	Citroën C3 R5	8:58.4	Rovanperä / Halttunen
16 June	SS19	Sassari — Argentiera 2	6.89 km	**Østberg / Eriksen**	Citroën C3 R5	5:12.6	Rovanperä / Halttunen

==== Championship standings ====
Pos.	Drivers' championships			Co-drivers' championships			Manufacturers' championships		
Pos.	Move	Driver	Points	Move	Co-driver	Points	Move	Manufacturer	Points
1		Kalle Rovanperä	111		Jonne Halttunen	111	1	Škoda Motorsport	159
2		Mads Østberg	98		Torstein Eriksen	98	1	M-Sport Ford WRT	159
3	1	Gus Greensmith	85		Elliott Edmondson	85		Citroën Total	98
4		Łukasz Pieniążek	74		Kamil Heller	62			
5		Jan Kopecký	36		Pavel Dresler	36			

=== World Rally Championship-2 ===
Pierre-Louis Loubet enjoyed a troublefree day in the lead. The major retirements of the leg included Fabio Andolfi, who ripped a front wheel from his Fabia, and Ole Christian Veiby due to multiple issues. On day two, Nikolay Gryazin retired from second when he hit a rock and ripped off his right-front wheel. Back to the front, Takamoto Katsuta surpassed Loubet in the final test of the leg. However, his car was on fire on the final day and forced to retire from the rally, which handled the victory back to the former category leader Loubet.

==== Classification ====
Position		No.	Driver	Co-driver	Entrant	Car	Time	Difference	Points	
Event	Class	No.	Driver	Co-driver	Entrant	Car	Time	Difference	Class	Event
11	1	49	Pierre-Louis Loubet	Daniel Barritt	Pierre-Louis Loubet	Škoda Fabia R5	3:32:27.2	0.0	25	0
12	2	46	Kajetan Kajetanowicz	Maciej Szczepaniak	Kajetan Kajetanowicz	Škoda Fabia R5	3:44:21.9	+41.7	18	0
13	3	50	Simone Tempestini	Sergiu Itu	Simone Tempestini	Hyundai i20 R5	3:44:34.8	+54.6	15	0
14	4	45	Marco Bulacia Wilkinson	Fabian Cretu	Marco Bulacia Wilkinson	Škoda Fabia R5	3:44:21.9	+41.7	12	0
20	5	42	Ole Christian Veiby	Jonas Andersson	Ole Christian Veiby	Volkswagen Polo GTI R5	3:44:53.7	+1:13.5	10	0
34	6	48	Guillaume De Mevius	Martijn Wydaeghe	Guillaume De Mevius	Citroën C3 R5	4:27:40.3	+44:00.1	8	0
37	7	44	Fabio Andolfi	Simone Scattolin	Fabio Andolfi	Škoda Fabia R5	4:38:11.1	+54:30.9	6	0
Retired SS17		41	Takamoto Katsuta	Daniel Barritt	Takamoto Katsuta	Ford Fiesta R5	Fire		0	0
Retired SS16		51	Nil Solans	Marc Martí	Nil Solans	Ford Fiesta R5	Accident		0	0
Retired SS10		43	Nikolay Gryazin	Yaroslav Fedorov	Nikolay Gryazin	Škoda Fabia R5	Lost wheel		0	0

==== Special stages ====
Results in bold denote first in the RC2 class, the class which both the WRC-2 Pro and WRC-2 championships run to.

Date	No.	Stage name	Distance	Winners	Car	Time	Class leaders
13 June	—	Olmedo [Shakedown]	3.92 km	Katsuta / Barritt; Veiby / Andersson	Ford Fiesta R5; Volkswagen Polo GTI R5	3:10.0	—N/a
13 June	SS1	Ittiri Arena Show	2.00 km	**Gryazin / Fedorov**	Škoda Fabia R5	2:05.4	Gryazin / Fedorov
14 June	SS2	Tula 1	22.25 km	Loubet / Landais	Škoda Fabia R5	19:30.0	Loubet / Landais
14 June	SS3	Castelsardo 1	14.72 km	**Gryazin / Fedorov**	Škoda Fabia R5	11:29.4	Loubet / Landais
14 June	SS4	Tergu — Osilo 1	14.14 km	Katsuta / Barritt	Ford Fiesta R5	9:30.6	Loubet / Landais
14 June	SS5	Monte Baranta 1	10.99 km	Kajetanowicz / Szczepaniak	Škoda Fabia R5	8:26.9	Loubet / Landais
14 June	SS6	Tula 2	22.25 km	Loubet / Landais	Škoda Fabia R5	19:21.0	Loubet / Landais
14 June	SS7	Castelsardo 2	14.72 km	Stage interrupted			
14 June	SS8	Tergu — Osilo 2	14.14 km	**Loubet / Landais**	Škoda Fabia R5	9:11.1	Loubet / Landais
14 June	SS9	Monte Baranta 2	10.99 km	Loubet / Landais	Škoda Fabia R5	8:13.1	Loubet / Landais
15 June	SS10	Monte Lerno 1	14.97 km	Veiby / Andersson	Volkswagen Polo GTI R5	9:42.2	Loubet / Landais
15 June	SS11	Monti di Alà 1	28.21 km	Andolfi / Scattolin	Škoda Fabia R5	17:50.2	Loubet / Landais
15 June	SS12	Coiluna — Loelle 1	28.03 km	Veiby / Andersson	Volkswagen Polo GTI R5	19:08.6	Loubet / Landais
15 June	SS13	Monte Lerno 2	14.97 km	Veiby / Andersson	Volkswagen Polo GTI R5	9:38.5	Loubet / Landais
15 June	SS14	Monti di Alà 2	28.21 km	Veiby / Andersson	Volkswagen Polo GTI R5	17:22.8	Loubet / Landais
15 June	SS15	Coiluna — Loelle 2	28.03 km	Katsuta / Barritt	Ford Fiesta R5	18:57.0	Katsuta / Barritt
16 June	SS16	Cala Flumini 1	14.06 km	Veiby / Andersson	Volkswagen Polo GTI R5	9:09.3	Katsuta / Barritt
16 June	SS17	Sassari — Argentiera 1	6.89 km	Veiby / Andersson	Volkswagen Polo GTI R5	5:14.7	Loubet / Landais
16 June	SS18	Cala Flumini 2	14.06 km	Veiby / Andersson	Volkswagen Polo GTI R5	5:14.7	Loubet / Landais
16 June	SS19	Sassari — Argentiera 2	6.89 km	Bulacia Wilkinson / Cretu	Škoda Fabia R5	5:17.2	Loubet / Landais

==== Championship standings ====
Pos.	Drivers' championships			Co-drivers' championships		
Pos.	Move	Driver	Points	Move	Co-driver	Points
1		Benito Guerra	69		Jaime Zapata	69
2	6	Pierre-Louis Loubet	51	6	Vincent Landais	51
3		Ole Christian Veiby	50		Jonas Andersson	50
4	2	Takamoto Katsuta	47	2	Daniel Barritt	47
5	1	Nikolay Gryazin	38	1	Yaroslav Fedorov	38

=== Junior World Rally Championship ===
Dennis Rådström dominated the first day, while Sean Johnston retired from the leg due to clipping a bank and plunging off the road. Rådström maintained the lead on leg two, but his lead was slashed to only 1.2 seconds. However, he lost the lead to Jan Solans, who eventually won the J-WRC victory.

==== Classification ====
Position		No.	Driver	Co-driver	Entrant	Car	Time	Difference	Points	
Event	Class	No.	Driver	Co-driver	Entrant	Car	Time	Difference	Class	Stage
21	1	72	Jan Solans	Mauro Barreiro	Rally Team Spain	Ford Fiesta R2	4:02:36.2	0.0	25	12
22	2	73	Dennis Rådström	Johan Johansson	Dennis Rådström	Ford Fiesta R2	4:02:51.1	+14.9	18	6
23	3	71	Tom Kristensson	Henrik Appelskog	Tom Kristensson	Ford Fiesta R2	4:06:03.4	+3:27.2	15	0
24	4	79	Raul Baidu	Gabriel Lazar	Raul Baidu	Ford Fiesta R2	4:07:13.7	+4:37.5	12	0
25	5	76	Mārtiņš Sesks	Krišjānis Caune	LMT Autosporta Akadēmija	Ford Fiesta R5	4:08:11.1	+5:34.9	10	0
26	6	74	Julius Tannert	Helmar Hinneberg	ADAC Sachsen	Ford Fiesta R2	4:09:18.0	+6:41.8	8	0
28	7	80	Fabrizio Zaldívar	Fernando Mussano	Fabrizio Zaldívar	Ford Fiesta R2	4:11:35.1	+8:58.9	6	0
30	8	78	Enrico Oldrati	Elia De Guio	Enrico Oldrati	Ford Fiesta R2	4:20:20.8	+17:44.6	4	0
31	9	81	Nico Knacker	Tobias Braun	ADAC Weiser-Ems	Ford Fiesta R2	4:22:30.1	+19:53.9	2	0
Retired SS19		75	Tom Williams	Phil Hall	Tom Williams	Ford Fiesta R2	Withdrawn		0	0
Retired SS18		77	Sean Johnston	Alex Kihurani	Sean Johnston	Ford Fiesta R5	Oil leak		0	0

==== Special stages ====
Date	No.	Stage name	Distance	Winners	Car	Time	Class leaders
13 June	—	Olmedo [Shakedown]	3.92 km	Sesks / Caune	Ford Fiesta R2	3:36.4	—N/a
13 June	SS1	Ittiri Arena Show	2.00 km	Solans / Barreiro	Ford Fiesta R2	2:24.3	Solans / Barreiro
14 June	SS2	Tula 1	22.25 km	Stage interrupted (Note: The stage was interrupted following Fabio Andolfi and Simone Scattolin's accident. As a result, J-WRC crews had a nominal time of added 21:00.0 to their times.)			
14 June	SS3	Castelsardo 1	14.72 km	Rådström / Johansson	Ford Fiesta R2	12:53.2	Rådström / Johansson
14 June	SS4	Tergu — Osilo 1	14.14 km	Rådström / Johansson	Ford Fiesta R2	10:11.5	Rådström / Johansson
14 June	SS5	Monte Baranta 1	10.99 km	Solans / Barreiro	Ford Fiesta R2	9:17.2	Rådström / Johansson
14 June	SS6	Tula 2	22.25 km	Rådström / Johansson	Ford Fiesta R2	21:49.1	Rådström / Johansson
14 June	SS7	Castelsardo 2	14.72 km	Stage interrupted			
14 June	SS8	Tergu — Osilo 2	14.14 km	Rådström / Johansson	Ford Fiesta R2	9:59.7	Rådström / Johansson
14 June	SS9	Monte Baranta 2	10.99 km	Solans / Barreiro	Ford Fiesta R2	9:01.8	Rådström / Johansson
15 June	SS10	Monte Lerno 1	14.97 km	Solans / Barreiro	Ford Fiesta R2	10:49.4	Rådström / Johansson
15 June	SS11	Monti di Alà 1	28.21 km	Solans / Barreiro	Ford Fiesta R2	19:27.2	Rådström / Johansson
15 June	SS12	Coiluna — Loelle 1	28.03 km	Rådström / Johansson; Solans / Barreiro	Ford Fiesta R2; Ford Fiesta R2	20:46.0	Rådström / Johansson
15 June	SS13	Monte Lerno 2	14.97 km	Solans / Barreiro	Ford Fiesta R2	10:42.6	Rådström / Johansson
15 June	SS14	Monti di Alà 2	28.21 km	Solans / Barreiro	Ford Fiesta R2	19:23.8	Rådström / Johansson
15 June	SS15	Coiluna — Loelle 2	28.03 km	Rådström / Johansson	Ford Fiesta R2	20:38.5	Rådström / Johansson
16 June	SS16	Cala Flumini 1	14.06 km	Solans / Barreiro	Ford Fiesta R2	10:11.6	Rådström / Johansson
16 June	SS17	Sassari — Argentiera 1	6.89 km	Solans / Barreiro	Ford Fiesta R2	5:57.1	Solans / Barreiro
16 June	SS18	Cala Flumini 2	14.06 km	Solans / Barreiro	Ford Fiesta R2	9:58.8	Solans / Barreiro
16 June	SS19	Sassari — Argentiera 2	6.89 km	Solans / Barreiro	Ford Fiesta R2	5:52.2	Solans / Barreiro

==== Championship standings ====
Pos.	Drivers' championships			Co-drivers' championships			Nations' championships		
Pos.	Move	Driver	Points	Move	Co-driver	Points	Move	Country	Points
1	1	Jan Solans	71	1	Mauro Barreiro	71		Sweden	61
2	1	Tom Kristensson	62	1	Henrik Appelskog	62		Spain	55
3		Dennis Rådström	56		Johan Johansson	56	1	Germany	37
4		Julius Tannert	36		Jürgen Heigl	36	1	Estonia	28
5		Roland Poom	26		Ken Järveoja	26	4	Romania	24

== Notes ==
Previous rally: 2019 Rally de Portugal	2019 FIA World Rally Championship	Next rally: 2019 Rally Finland
Previous rally: 2018 Rally Italia Sardegna	2019 Rally Italia Sardegna	Next rally: 2020 Rally Italia Sardegna
