= Jonne Halttunen =

Finnish rally co-driver (born 1985)

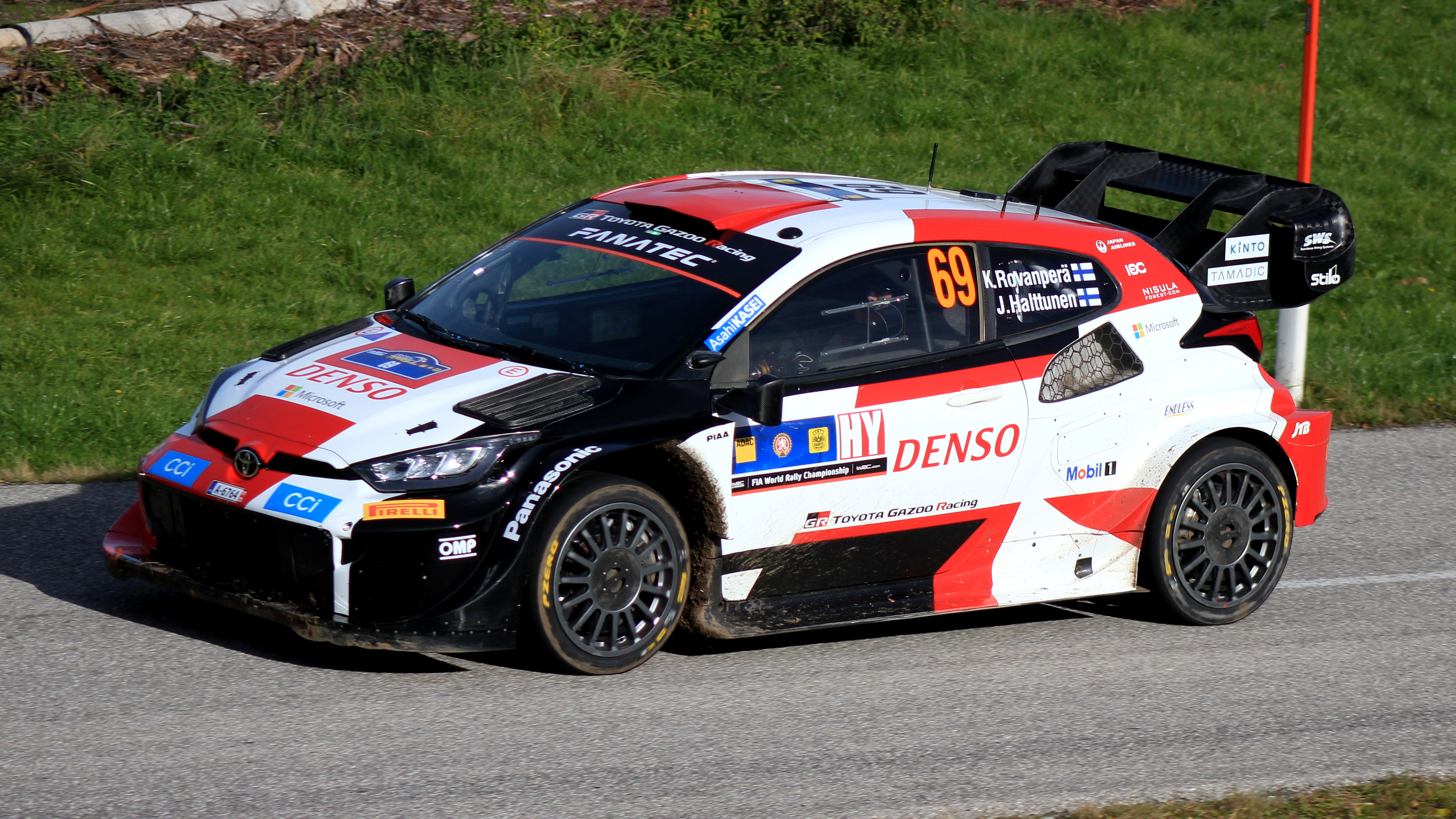

Personal information
- Nationality: (Finland) Finnish
- Full name: Jonne Aulis Halttunen
- Born: 13 December 1985 (age 40)

World Rally Championship record
- Years active: 2011–2014, 2017–2025
- Driver: (Finland) Santeri Jokinen (Finland) Matias Kauppinen (Finland) Teemu Asunmaa (Finland) Kalle Rovanperä
- Teams: Škoda, Toyota
- Rallies: 91
- Co-championships: 2 (2022, 2023)
- Rally wins: 18
- Podiums: 30
- Stage wins: 271
- Total points: 1119
- First rally: 2011 Rally Finland
- First win: 2021 Rally Estonia
- Last win: 2025 Central European Rally
- Last rally: 2025 Rally Saudi Arabia

Jonne Aulis Halttunen (born 13 December 1985) is a Finnish rally co-driver. Currently, he is the co-driver of Kalle Rovanperä, driving the Toyota GR Yaris Rally1. Previously, they represented Škoda Motorsport to participate in the World Rally Championship-2 Pro category.

== Rally career ==
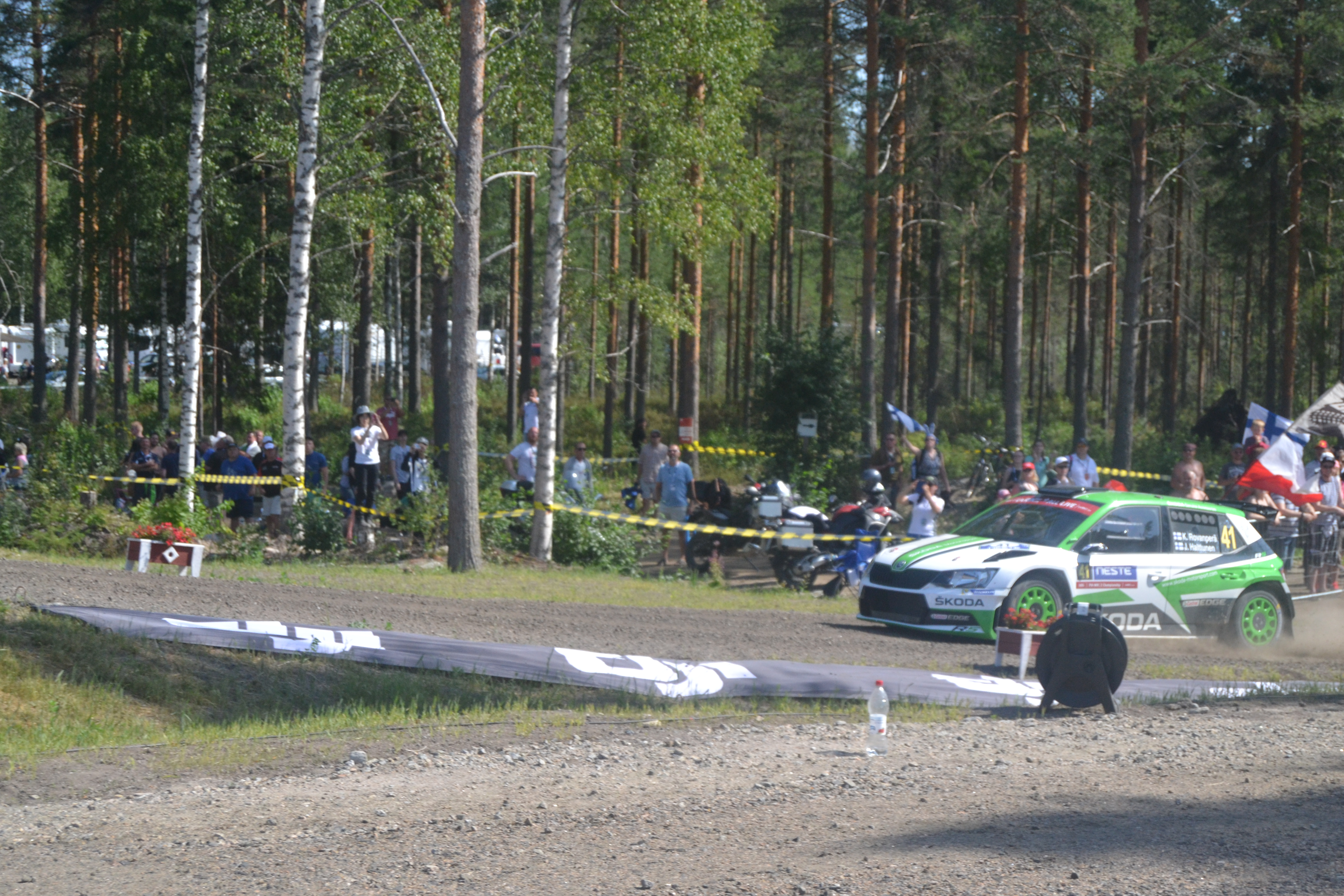
Jonne Halttunen during 2018 Rally Finland in a Škoda Fabia R5.

Halttunen made his debut at 2011 Rally Finland. In 2017, he started to cooperate with the young Finn Kalle Rovanperä in the WRC-2 class. They won the class victory as well as scored their first career points just in their second rally in Australia. They won their second and third category victory at 2018 Wales Rally GB and 2018 Rally Catalunya respectively.

In 2019, Halttunen and Rovanperä were promoted to the newly created World Rally Championship-2 Pro category. Having won in Chile and Portugal, the crew led the championship by three points.

Halttunen won the co-driver's championship in 2022 and in 2023.

== Rally victories ==
=== WRC victories ===
#	Event	Season	Driver	Car
1	2021 Rally Estonia	2021	(Finland) Kalle Rovanperä	Toyota Yaris WRC
2	(Greece) 2021 Acropolis Rally	2021	(Finland) Kalle Rovanperä	Toyota Yaris WRC
3	2022 Rally Sweden	2022	(Finland) Kalle Rovanperä	Toyota GR Yaris Rally1
4	2022 Croatia Rally	2022	(Finland) Kalle Rovanperä	Toyota GR Yaris Rally1
5	2022 Rally de Portugal	2022	(Finland) Kalle Rovanperä	Toyota GR Yaris Rally1
6	(Kenya) 2022 Safari Rally	2022	(Finland) Kalle Rovanperä	Toyota GR Yaris Rally1
7	2022 Rally Estonia	2022	(Finland) Kalle Rovanperä	Toyota GR Yaris Rally1
8	2022 Rally New Zealand	2022	(Finland) Kalle Rovanperä	Toyota GR Yaris Rally1
9	2023 Rally de Portugal	2023	(Finland) Kalle Rovanperä	Toyota GR Yaris Rally1
10	2023 Rally Estonia	2023	(Finland) Kalle Rovanperä	Toyota GR Yaris Rally1
11	(Greece) 2023 Acropolis Rally	2023	(Finland) Kalle Rovanperä	Toyota GR Yaris Rally1
12	(Kenya) 2024 Safari Rally	2024	(Finland) Kalle Rovanperä	Toyota GR Yaris Rally1
13	2024 Rally Poland	2024	(Finland) Kalle Rovanperä	Toyota GR Yaris Rally1
14	2024 Rally Latvia	2024	(Finland) Kalle Rovanperä	Toyota GR Yaris Rally1
15	2024 Rally Chile	2024	(Finland) Kalle Rovanperä	Toyota GR Yaris Rally1
16	(Spain) 2025 Rally Islas Canarias	2025	(Finland) Kalle Rovanperä	Toyota GR Yaris Rally1
17	2025 Rally Finland	2025	(Finland) Kalle Rovanperä	Toyota GR Yaris Rally1
18	(Europe) 2025 Central European Rally	2025	(Finland) Kalle Rovanperä	Toyota GR Yaris Rally1

=== WRC-2 victories ===
#	Event	Season	Driver	Car
1	2017 Rally Australia	2017	(Finland) Kalle Rovanperä	Ford Fiesta R5
2	(United Kingdom) 2018 Wales Rally GB	2018	(Finland) Kalle Rovanperä	Škoda Fabia R5
3	(Spain) 2018 Rally Catalunya	2018	(Finland) Kalle Rovanperä	Škoda Fabia R5

=== WRC-2 Pro victories ===
#	Event	Season	Driver	Car
1	2019 Rally Chile	2019	(Finland) Kalle Rovanperä	Škoda Fabia R5
2	2019 Rally de Portugal	2019	(Finland) Kalle Rovanperä	Škoda Fabia R5 Evo
3	(Italy) 2019 Rally Italia Sardegna	2019	(Finland) Kalle Rovanperä	Škoda Fabia R5 Evo
4	2019 Rally Finland	2019	(Finland) Kalle Rovanperä	Škoda Fabia R5 Evo
5	(United Kingdom) 2019 Wales Rally GB	2019	(Finland) Kalle Rovanperä	Škoda Fabia R5 Evo

== Career results ==
=== WRC results ===
Year	Entrant	Car	1	2	3	4	5	6	7	8	9	10	11	12	13	14	Pos.	Points
2011	Santeri Jokinen	Honda Civic Type R	SWE	MEX	POR	JOR	ITA	ARG	GRE	FIN; 50	GER	AUS	FRA	ESP	GBR		NC	0
2012	Matias Kauppinen	Subaru Impreza STi N12	MON	SWE	MEX	POR	ARG	GRE	NZL	FIN; 24	GER	GBR	FRA	ITA	ESP		NC	0
2013	Matias Kauppinen	Subaru Impreza STi	MON	SWE	MEX	POR	ARG	GRE	ITA	FIN; 26	GER	AUS	FRA	ESP	GBR		NC	0
2014	Matias Kauppinen	Citroën C2 R2	MON	SWE	MEX	POR	ARG	ITA	POL	FIN; Ret	GER	AUS	FRA	ESP	GBR		NC	0
2017	Hannu's Rally Team	Škoda Fabia R5	MON	SWE	MEX	FRA	ARG	POR	ITA	POL	FIN; 13						27th	1
2017	Kalle Rovanperä	Ford Fiesta R5										GER	ESP	GBR; 35	AUS; 10		27th	1
2018	Kalle Rovanperä	Škoda Fabia R5	MON; 11	SWE													23rd	3
2018	Škoda Motorsport	Škoda Fabia R5			MEX; 15	FRA	ARG; Ret	POR	ITA	FIN; 14							23rd	3
2018	Škoda Motorsport II	Škoda Fabia R5									GER; 10	TUR	GBR; 9	ESP; 12	AUS		23rd	3
2019	Škoda Motorsport	Škoda Fabia R5	MON; 18	SWE; 18	MEX	FRA; Ret	ARG	CHL; 8									13th	18
2019	Škoda Motorsport	Skoda Fabia R5 Evo							POR; 6	ITA; 9	FIN; 9	GER; 16	TUR; 18	GBR; 9	ESP; 12	AUS; C	13th	18
2020	Toyota Gazoo Racing WRT	Toyota Yaris WRC	MON; 5	SWE; 3	MEX; 5	EST; 5	TUR; 4	ITA; Ret	MNZ; 5								5th	80
2021	Toyota Gazoo Racing WRT	Toyota Yaris WRC	MON; 4	ARC; 2	CRO; Ret	POR; 22	ITA; 25	KEN; 6	EST; 1	BEL; 3	GRE; 1	FIN; 34	ESP; 5	MNZ; 9			4th	142
2022	Toyota Gazoo Racing WRT	Toyota GR Yaris Rally1	MON; 4	SWE; 1	CRO; 1	POR; 1	ITA; 5	KEN; 1	EST; 1	FIN; 2	BEL; 62	GRE; 15	NZL; 1	ESP; 3	JPN; 12		1st	255
2023	Toyota Gazoo Racing WRT	Toyota GR Yaris Rally1	MON; 2	SWE; 4	MEX; 4	CRO; 4	POR; 1	ITA; 3	KEN; 2	EST; 1	FIN; Ret	GRE; 1	CHL; 4	EUR; 2	JPN; 3		1st	250
2024	Toyota Gazoo Racing WRT	Toyota GR Yaris Rally1	MON	SWE; 39	KEN; 1	CRO	POR; 31	ITA	POL; 1	LAT; 1	FIN; Ret	GRE	CHL; 1	EUR	JPN		7th	114
2025	Toyota Gazoo Racing WRT	Toyota GR Yaris Rally1	MON; 4	SWE; 5	KEN; Ret	ESP; 1	POR; 3	ITA; 3	GRE; 27	EST; 4	FIN; 1	PAR; 5	CHL; 6	EUR; 1	JPN; 6	SAU; 7	3rd	256

=== WRC-2 results ===
Year	Entrant	Car	1	2	3	4	5	6	7	8	9	10	11	12	13	Pos.	Points
2017	Kalle Rovanperä	Ford Fiesta R5	MON	SWE	MEX	FRA	ARG	POR	ITA	POL	FIN	GER	ESP	GBR; 15	AUS; 1	15th	25
2018	Škoda Motorsport	Škoda Fabia R5	MON	SWE	MEX; 5	FRA	ARG; Ret	POR	ITA	FIN; 4						3rd	90
2018	Škoda Motorsport II	Škoda Fabia R5									GER; 2	TUR	GBR; 1	ESP; 1	AUS	3rd	90

=== WRC-2 Pro results ===
Year	Entrant	Car	1	2	3	4	5	6	7	8	9	10	11	12	13	14	Pos.	Points
2019	Škoda Motorsport	Škoda Fabia R5	MON; 2	SWE; 2	MEX	FRA; Ret	ARG	CHL; 1									1st	176
2019	Škoda Motorsport	Skoda Fabia R5 Evo							POR; 1	ITA; 1	FIN; 1	GER; 3	TUR; 3	GBR; 1	ESP; 3	AUS; C	1st	176
