= Łukasz Pieniążek =

Polish rally driver

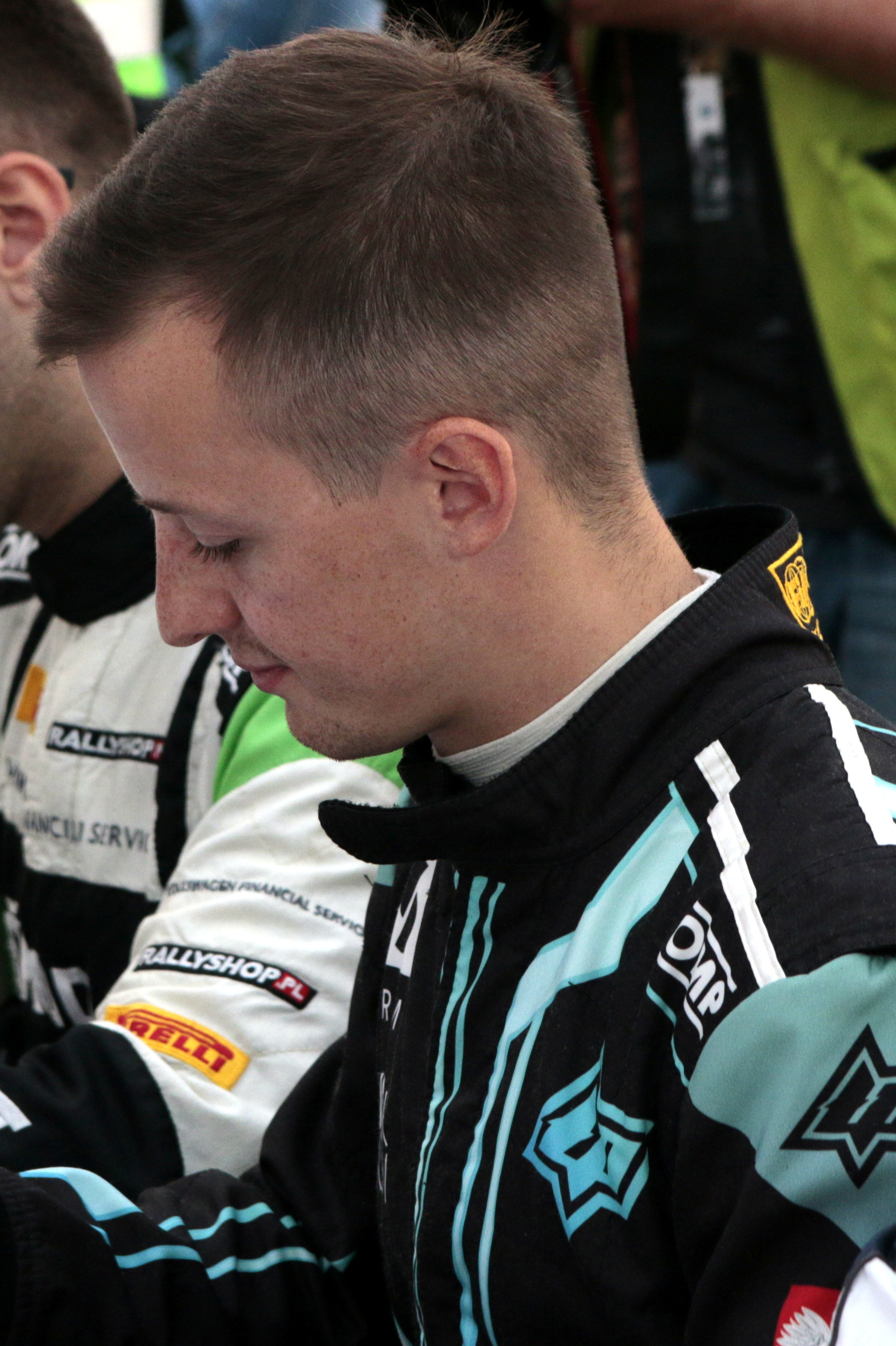
- Pieniążek in 2018

Personal information
- Nationality: (Poland) Polish
- Born: September 19, 1990 (age 36)

World Rally Championship record
- Years active: 2016–present
- Co-driver: (Poland) Jakub Gerber (Poland) Kamil Heller (Poland) Przemysław Mazur
- Teams: M-Sport Ford World Rally Team
- Rallies: 21
- Championships: 0
- Rally wins: 0
- Podiums: 0
- Stage wins: 0
- Total points: 2
- First rally: 2016 Rally de Portugal
- Last rally: 2019 Rally de Portugal

Łukasz Pieniążek (born 19 September 1990) is a Polish rally driver. Currently, He drives for M-Sport Ford in the WRC-2 Pro category.

== Rally career ==
Pieniążek made his WRC debut at 2016 Rally de Portugal, driving a Citroën DS3 R3T Max in the WRC-3 and J-WRC categories. One year later, he was promoted to the WRC-2 category.

At 2018 Rally de Portugal, Pieniążek scored his first WRC points, finishing ninth in the overall standings. The rally was also his first-ever podium finish in the WRC-2 championship.

On January 10, 2019, it was confirmed by M-Sport Ford that Pieniążek would contest for selected events in the newly created WRC-2 Pro championship. In Guanajuato and Corsica, he won the Pro class.

== Rally victories ==
=== WRC-2 Pro victories ===
#	Event	Season	Co-driver	Car
1	16th Rally Guanajuato Mexico	2019	(Poland) Kamil Heller	Ford Fiesta R5
2	(France) 62^{e} Corsica Linea – Tour de Corse	2019	(Poland) Kamil Heller	Ford Fiesta R5

== Rally results ==
=== WRC results ===
Year	Entrant	Car	1	2	3	4	5	6	7	8	9	10	11	12	13	14	WDC	Points
2016	Łukasz Pieniążek	Citroën DS3 R3T Max	MON	SWE	MEX	ARG	POR; 58	ITA	POL; 44	FIN	GER	CHN; C	FRA	ESP	GBR	AUS	NC	0
2017	TRT Peugeot WRT	Peugeot 208 T16	MON	SWE	MEX	FRA; 36	ARG	POR; 19	ITA; 26	POL; 37	FIN	GER; 23	ESP; 19				NC	0
2017	Printsport	Škoda Fabia R5												GBR; 23	AUS		NC	0
2018	Printsport	Škoda Fabia R5	MON	SWE; 38	MEX	FRA; 15	ARG	POR; 9	ITA; 16	FIN; Ret	GER; 14	TUR	GBR; 14	ESP; 33	AUS		24th	2
2019	M-Sport Ford World Rally Team	Ford Fiesta R5	MON	SWE; 50	MEX; 11	FRA; 24	ARG	CHL	POR; 27	ITA	FIN	GER	TUR	GBR	ESP	AUS; C	NC	0

* Season still in progress.

=== WRC-2 Pro results ===
Year	Entrant	Car	1	2	3	4	5	6	7	8	9	10	11	12	13	14	WDC	Points
2019	M-Sport Ford World Rally Team	Ford Fiesta R5	MON	SWE; 4	MEX; 1	FRA; 1	ARG	CHL	POR; 4	ITA	FIN	GER	TUR	GBR	ESP	AUS; C	5th	74

* Season still in progress.
