= 2019 WRC2 Pro Championship =

The 2019 FIA WRC2 Pro Championship was the first and only season of WRC2 Pro, a rallying championship organised and governed by the Fédération Internationale de l'Automobile as the second-highest tier of international rallying. The category was open to cars entered by manufacturers and complying with Group R5 regulations, while WRC2 was open to privately entered cars.

== Calendar ==
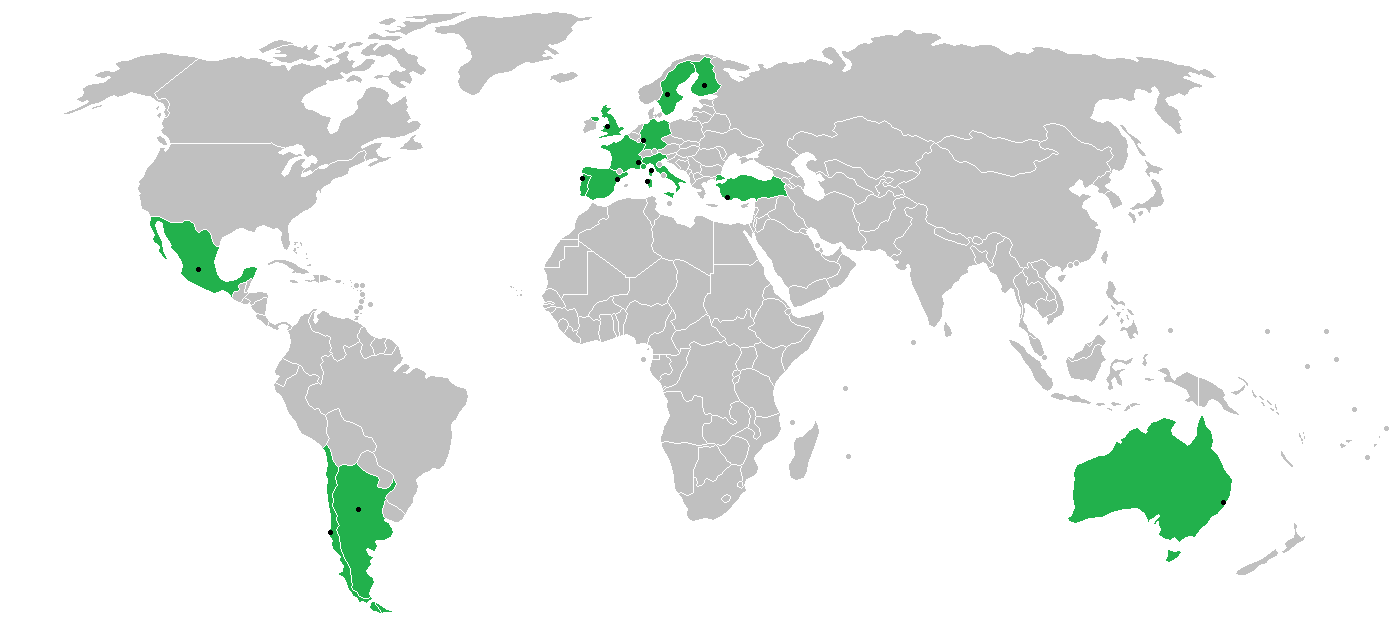
A map showing the locations of the rallies in the 2019 championship. Event headquarters are marked with a black dot.

The championship was contested over fourteen rounds in Europe, the Middle East, North and South America, and Australia.

| Round | Dates | | Rally | Rally headquarters | Rally details | | |
| Round | Start | Finish | Rally | Rally headquarters | Surface | Stages | Distance |
|---|---|---|---|---|---|---|---|
| 1 | 24 January | 27 January | (Monaco) Rallye Automobile Monte Carlo | Gap, Provence-Alpes-Côte d'Azur (Note: The rally base of the Monte Carlo Rally was located in France.) | Mixed (Note: The Monte Carlo Rally was run on a tarmac and snow surface.) | 16 (Note: The third stage of the rally was cancelled on safety grounds when spectator areas became overcrowded.) | 323.83 km |
| 2 | 14 February | 17 February | Rally Sweden | Torsby, Värmland | Snow | 19 | 316.80 km |
| 3 | 7 March | 10 March | (Mexico) Rally Guanajuato México | León, Guanajuato | Gravel | 21 | 316.51 km |
| 4 | 28 March | 31 March | (France) Tour de Corse | Bastia, Corsica | Tarmac | 14 | 347.51 km |
| 5 | 25 April | 28 April | Rally Argentina | Villa Carlos Paz, Córdoba | Gravel | 18 (Note: The third stage of the rally was cancelled due to the weather.) | 347.50 km |
| 6 | 9 May | 12 May | Rally Chile | Concepción, Biobío | Gravel | 16 | 304.81 km |
| 7 | 30 May | 2 June | Rally de Portugal | Matosinhos, Porto | Gravel | 20 (Note: The 14th and the 15th stage of the rally was cancelled.) | 311.47 km |
| 8 | 13 June | 16 June | (Italy) Rally Italia Sardegna | Alghero, Sardinia | Gravel | 19 | 310.52 km |
| 9 | 1 August | 4 August | Rally Finland | Jyväskylä, Central Finland | Gravel | 23 | 307.58 km |
| 10 | 22 August | 25 August | (Germany) ADAC Rallye Deutschland | Bostalsee, Saarland | Tarmac | 19 | 344.04 km |
| 11 | 12 September | 15 September | Rally of Turkey | Marmaris, Muğla | Gravel | 17 | 318.77 km |
| 12 | 3 October | 6 October | (United Kingdom) Wales Rally GB | Llandudno, Conwy | Gravel | 22 (Note: The 20th stage of the rally was cancelled due to insufficient safety cover.) | 312.75 km |
| 13 | 24 October | 27 October | (Spain) RACC Rally Catalunya de España | Salou, Catalonia | Mixed (Note: The first leg of Rally Catalunya will run on gravel stages and the second and third legs on tarmac stages.) | 17 | 325.56 km |
| 14 | 14 November | 17 November | Rally Australia | Coffs Harbour, New South Wales | Gravel | Cancelled (Note: Rally Australia was cancelled due to a bushfire emergency in Northern New South Wales.) | |

=== Calendar expansion ===
Following the return of Rally Turkey to the championship in 2018, the FIA announced plans to expand the calendar to fourteen rounds in 2019 with the long-term objective of running sixteen championship events. Twelve prospective bids for events were put together, including candidate events in New Zealand, Japan and Chile. Prospective events in Kenya, Croatia, Canada and Estonia expressed interest in joining the calendar within five years.

The planned expansion put pressure on European rounds to maintain their position on the calendar as teams were unwilling to contest sixteen events immediately. The Tour de Corse and Rally Italia Sardegna proved to be unpopular among teams for the logistical difficulties of travelling to Corsica and Sardinia and low spectator attendance at the events. Organisers of Rally Japan reached an agreement with the sport's promoter to host a rally in 2019, with the proposed event moving from Sapporo on the island of Hokkaido to Toyota City in Honshu. However, plans to return to Japan were abandoned when the promoter came under pressure to retain the Tour de Corse.

The proposed events in Japan and Kenya ran candidate events in 2019 in a bid to join the championship in 2020. Both were successful in secure a place on the 2020 calendar. The calendar published in October 2018 included Rally Chile as part of the expansion to fourteen rounds. The event was based in Concepción and ran on gravel roads.

=== Route changes ===
The route of Rallye Monte Carlo was shortened by 70.91 km (44.1 mi) compared to the 2018 route. The route was revised after rule changes that were introduced for the 2019 championship limited the maximum distance of a route to 350 km (217.5 mi). Organisers of the Tour de Corse announced plans for a new route, with up to three-quarters of the 2019 route being revised from the 2018 rally. Rally de Portugal was also shortened by 46.72 km (29.0 mi) compared to the 2018 route.

== Entries ==
| Manufacturer | Entrant | Car | Tyre | Crew details | | |
| Manufacturer | Entrant | Car | Tyre | Driver name | Co-driver name | Rounds |
|---|---|---|---|---|---|---|
| Ford | (United Kingdom) M-Sport Ford WRT | Ford Fiesta R5 | M | (United Kingdom) Gus Greensmith | (United Kingdom) Elliott Edmondson | 1–2, 5–6, 8 |
| Ford | (United Kingdom) M-Sport Ford WRT | Ford Fiesta R5 | M | (Poland) Łukasz Pieniążek | (Poland) Kamil Heller | 2–4 |
| Ford | (United Kingdom) M-Sport Ford WRT | Ford Fiesta R5 | M | (Poland) Łukasz Pieniążek | (Poland) Jakub Gerber | 7 |
| Ford | (United Kingdom) M-Sport Ford WRT | Ford Fiesta R5 Mk. II | M | (France) Eric Camilli | (France) Benjamin Veillas | 9–10 |
| Ford | (United Kingdom) M-Sport Ford WRT | Ford Fiesta R5 Mk. II | M | (United Kingdom) Gus Greensmith | (United Kingdom) Elliott Edmondson | 11–13 |
| Ford | (United Kingdom) M-Sport Ford WRT | Ford Fiesta R5 Mk. II | M | (New Zealand) Hayden Paddon | (New Zealand) John Kennard | 12 |
| Škoda | (Czech Republic) Škoda Motorsport | Škoda Fabia R5 | M | (Finland) Kalle Rovanperä | (Finland) Jonne Halttunen | 1–2, 4, 6 |
| Škoda | (Czech Republic) Škoda Motorsport | Škoda Fabia R5 | M | (Bolivia) Marco Bulacia (Note: The crew of Marco Bulacia Wilkinson and Fabian Cretu was run wholly independently from Škoda Motorsport in Argentina and Chile, but were nominated to score points for them in the Pro class.) | (Argentina) Fabian Cretu | 5–6 |
| Škoda | (Czech Republic) Škoda Motorsport | Škoda Fabia R5 | P | (Finland) Eerik Pietarinen | (Finland) Juhana Raitanen | 2 |
| Škoda | (Czech Republic) Škoda Motorsport | Škoda Fabia R5 Evo | P | (Finland) Eerik Pietarinen | (Finland) Juhana Raitanen | 9 |
| Škoda | (Czech Republic) Škoda Motorsport | Škoda Fabia R5 Evo | M | (Finland) Kalle Rovanperä | (Finland) Jonne Halttunen | 7–13 |
| Škoda | (Czech Republic) Škoda Motorsport | Škoda Fabia R5 Evo | M | (Czech Republic) Jan Kopecký | (Czech Republic) Pavel Dresler | 7–8, 10–11 |
| Škoda | (Czech Republic) Škoda Motorsport | Škoda Fabia R5 Evo | M | (Czech Republic) Jan Kopecký | (Czech Republic) Jan Hloušek | 12–13 |
| Škoda | (Czech Republic) Škoda Motorsport | Škoda Fabia R5 Evo | M | (Czech Republic) Jan Kopecký | (Czech Republic) Michal Ernst | 14 |
| Citroën | (France) Citroën Total | Citroën C3 R5 | M | (Norway) Mads Østberg | (Norway) Torstein Eriksen | 2, 5–7, 9–10, 12–13 |

=== Crew changes ===
Škoda Motorsport scaled back their involvement in the championship to a single two-car team. The team retained defending drivers' champion Jan Kopecký and Kalle Rovanperä, while 2017 champions Pontus Tidemand and Jonas Andersson left the team. Tidemand later joined WRC team M-Sport Ford on a part-time basis, while Andersson remained in WRC2, partnering Ole Christian Veiby. M-Sport Ford WRT will also enter two cars, one for Polish driver Łukasz Pieniążek and the other for Gus Greensmith and Elliott Edmondson. Greensmith will also make his World Rally Car début with M-Sport Ford WRT. Reigning two-time French Rally champion Yoann Bonato, who competed for privateer Citroën team CHL Sport Auto in 2018, was entered by the factory Citroën team for Monte Carlo, before Citroën withdrew their entry from the rally, leaving Bonato to run as a WRC2 entrant. After driving for Citroën's WRC team in 2018, Mads Østberg moved to the WRC-2 in 2019, staying with Citroën's factory team in a different C3 R5, in conjunction with DG Sport. Although not a member of Škoda's factory roster, 2018 Finnish Rally Champion Eerik Pietarinen was nominated to score points for Škoda alongside factory driver Kalle Rovanperä at Rally Sweden. Škoda would repeat this practice with 18-year-old Bolivian driver Marco Bulacia Wilkinson, who is set to participate in the pro-class in the South American double-header in Argentina and Chile, joining Rovanperä on the latter rally.

== Results and standings ==
=== Season summary ===
| Round | Event | Winning driver | Winning co-driver | Winning entrant | Winning time | Report |
|---|---|---|---|---|---|---|
| 1 | (Monaco) Rallye Automobile Monte Carlo | (United Kingdom) Gus Greensmith | (United Kingdom) Elliott Edmondson | (United Kingdom) M-Sport Ford WRT | 3:34:20.5 | Report |
| 2 | Rally Sweden | (Norway) Mads Østberg | (Norway) Torstein Eriksen | (France) Citroën Total | 2:55:54.5 | Report |
| 3 | (Mexico) Rally Guanajuato México | (Poland) Łukasz Pieniążek | (Poland) Kamil Heller | (United Kingdom) M-Sport Ford WRT | 4:22:31.1 | Report |
| 4 | (France) Tour de Corse | (Poland) Łukasz Pieniążek | (Poland) Kamil Heller | (United Kingdom) M-Sport Ford WRT | 3:52:19.7 | Report |
| 5 | Rally Argentina | (Norway) Mads Østberg | (Norway) Torstein Eriksen | (France) Citroën Total | 3:35:23.1 | Report |
| 6 | Rally Chile | (Finland) Kalle Rovanperä | (Finland) Jonne Halttunen | (Czech Republic) Škoda Motorsport | 3:23:46.3 | Report |
| 7 | Rally de Portugal | (Finland) Kalle Rovanperä | (Finland) Jonne Halttunen | (Czech Republic) Škoda Motorsport | 3:30:57.0 | Report |
| 8 | (Italy) Rally Italia Sardegna | (Finland) Kalle Rovanperä | (Finland) Jonne Halttunen | (Czech Republic) Škoda Motorsport | 3:40:51.8 | Report |
| 9 | Rally Finland | (Finland) Kalle Rovanperä | (Finland) Jonne Halttunen | (Czech Republic) Škoda Motorsport | 2:38:34.4 | Report |
| 10 | (Germany) ADAC Rallye Deutschland | (Czech Republic) Jan Kopecký | (Czech Republic) Pavel Dresler | (Czech Republic) Škoda Motorsport | 3:27:24.1 | Report |
| 11 | Marmaris Rally of Turkey | (United Kingdom) Gus Greensmith | (United Kingdom) Elliott Edmondson | (United Kingdom) M-Sport Ford WRT | 4:05:30.8 | Report |
| 12 | (United Kingdom) Wales Rally GB | (Finland) Kalle Rovanperä | (Finland) Jonne Halttunen | (Czech Republic) Škoda Motorsport | 3:11:49.1 | Report |
| 13 | (Spain) RACC Rally Catalunya de España | (Norway) Mads Østberg | (Norway) Torstein Eriksen | (France) Citroën Total | 3:16:04.2 | Report |
| 14 | Rally Australia | Rally cancelled (due to bushfires) | | | | Report |

=== Scoring system ===
Points were awarded to the top ten classified finishers in each event.

| Position | 1st | 2nd | 3rd | 4th | 5th | 6th | 7th | 8th | 9th | 10th |
| Points | 25 | 18 | 15 | 12 | 10 | 8 | 6 | 4 | 2 | 1 |

=== Drivers' standings ===
| Pos. | Driver | MON (Monaco) | SWE (Sweden) | MEX (Mexico) | FRA (France) | ARG (Argentina) | CHI (Chile) | POR (Portugal) | ITA (Italy) | FIN (Finland) | DEU (Germany) | TUR (Turkey) | GBR (United Kingdom) | CAT (Spain) | AUS (Australia) | Points | Best 8 |
|---|---|---|---|---|---|---|---|---|---|---|---|---|---|---|---|---|---|
| 1 | (Finland) Kalle Rovanperä | 2 | 2 | | Ret | | 1 | 1 | 1 | 1 | 3 | 3 | 1 | 3 | | 206 | 176 |
| 2 | (Norway) Mads Østberg | | 1 | | | 1 | 2 | 3 | 3 | | 4 | | 5 | 1 | | 145 | 145 |
| 3 | (United Kingdom) Gus Greensmith | 1 | 3 | | | 2 | 3 | | 4 | WD | | 1 | 3 | 4 | | 137 | 137 |
| 4 | (Czech Republic) Jan Kopecký | | | | | | | 2 | 2 | | 1 | 2 | 2 | 2 | WD | 115 | 115 |
| 5 | (Poland) Łukasz Pieniążek | | 4 | 1 | 1 | | | 4 | | | | | | | | 74 | 74 |
| 6 | (France) Eric Camilli | | | | | | | | | 2 | 2 | | | | | 36 | 36 |
| 7 | (Bolivia) Marco Bulacia | | | | | Ret | 4 | | | | | | | | | 12 | 12 |
| 8 | (New Zealand) Hayden Paddon | | | | | | | | | | | | 4 | | | 12 | 12 |
| 9 | (Finland) Eerik Pietarinen | | Ret | | | | | | | Ret | | | | | | 0 | 0 |
| Pos. | Driver | MON (Monaco) | SWE (Sweden) | MEX (Mexico) | FRA (France) | ARG (Argentina) | CHI (Chile) | POR (Portugal) | ITA (Italy) | FIN (Finland) | DEU (Germany) | TUR (Turkey) | GBR (United Kingdom) | CAT (Spain) | AUS (Australia) | Points | Best 8 |

Key
| Colour | Result |
|---|---|
| Gold | Winner |
| Silver | 2nd place |
| Bronze | 3rd place |
| Green | Points finish |
| Blue | Non-points finish |
| Blue | Non-classified finish (NC) |
| Purple | Did not finish (Ret) |
| Black | Excluded (EX) |
| Black | Disqualified (DSQ) |
| White | Did not start (DNS) |
| White | Cancelled (C) |
| Blank | Withdrew entry from the event (WD) |

=== Co-Drivers' standings ===
| Pos. | Co-Driver | MON (Monaco) | SWE (Sweden) | MEX (Mexico) | FRA (France) | ARG (Argentina) | CHI (Chile) | POR (Portugal) | ITA (Italy) | FIN (Finland) | DEU (Germany) | TUR (Turkey) | GBR (United Kingdom) | CAT (Spain) | AUS (Australia) | Points | Best 8 |
|---|---|---|---|---|---|---|---|---|---|---|---|---|---|---|---|---|---|
| 1 | (Finland) Jonne Halttunen | 2 | 2 | | Ret | | 1 | 1 | 1 | 1 | 3 | 3 | 1 | 3 | | 206 | 176 |
| 2 | (Norway) Torstein Eriksen | | 1 | | | 1 | 2 | 3 | 3 | | 4 | | 5 | 1 | | 145 | 145 |
| 3 | (United Kingdom) Elliott Edmondson | 1 | 3 | | 2 | | 3 | | 4 | WD | | 1 | 3 | 4 | | 137 | 137 |
| 4 | (Czech Republic) Pavel Dresler | | | | | | | 2 | 2 | | 1 | 2 | | | | 79 | 79 |
| 5 | (Poland) Kamil Heller | | 4 | 1 | 1 | | | | | | | | | | | 62 | 62 |
| 6 | (France) Benjamin Veillas | | | | | | | | | 2 | 2 | | | | | 36 | 36 |
| 7 | (Czech Republic) Jan Hloušek | | | | | | | | | | | | 2 | 2 | | 36 | 36 |
| 8 | (Argentina) Fabian Cretu | | | | | Ret | 4 | | | | | | | | | 12 | 12 |
| 9 | (Poland) Jakub Gerber | | | | | | | 4 | | | | | | | | 12 | 12 |
| 10 | (New Zealand) John Kennard | | | | | | | | | | | | 4 | | | 12 | 12 |
| 11 | (Finland) Juhana Raitanen | | Ret | | | | | | | Ret | | | | | | 0 | 0 |
| Pos. | Co-Driver | MON (Monaco) | SWE (Sweden) | MEX (Mexico) | FRA (France) | ARG (Argentina) | CHI (Chile) | POR (Portugal) | ITA (Italy) | FIN (Finland) | DEU (Germany) | TUR (Turkey) | GBR (United Kingdom) | CAT (Spain) | AUS (Australia) | Points | Best 8 |

Key
| Colour | Result |
|---|---|
| Gold | Winner |
| Silver | 2nd place |
| Bronze | 3rd place |
| Green | Points finish |
| Blue | Non-points finish |
| Blue | Non-classified finish (NC) |
| Purple | Did not finish (Ret) |
| Black | Excluded (EX) |
| Black | Disqualified (DSQ) |
| White | Did not start (DNS) |
| White | Cancelled (C) |
| Blank | Withdrew entry from the event (WD) |

=== Manufacturers' standings ===
| Pos. | Entrant | MON (Monaco) | SWE (Sweden) | MEX (Mexico) | FRA (France) | ARG (Argentina) | CHI (Chile) | POR (Portugal) | ITA (Italy) | FIN (Finland) | DEU (Germany) | TUR (Turkey) | GBR (United Kingdom) | CAT (Spain) | AUS (Australia) | Points |
|---|---|---|---|---|---|---|---|---|---|---|---|---|---|---|---|---|
| 1 | (Czech Republic) Škoda Motorsport | 2 | 2 | | Ret | Ret | 1 | 1 | 1 | 1 | 1 | 2 | 1 | 2 | WD | 323 |
| 1 | (Czech Republic) Škoda Motorsport | | Ret | | | | 4 | 2 | 2 | Ret | 3 | 3 | 2 | 3 | | 323 |
| 2 | (United Kingdom) M-Sport Ford WRT | 1 | 3 | 1 | 1 | 2 | 3 | 4 | 4 | 2 | 2 | 1 | 3 | 4 | | 259 |
| 2 | (United Kingdom) M-Sport Ford WRT | | 4 | | | | | | | WD | WD | | 4 | | | 259 |
| 3 | (France) Citroën Total | | 1 | | | 1 | 2 | 3 | 3 | | 4 | | 5 | 1 | | 145 |
| Pos. | Entrant | MON (Monaco) | SWE (Sweden) | MEX (Mexico) | FRA (France) | ARG (Argentina) | CHI (Chile) | POR (Portugal) | ITA (Italy) | FIN (Finland) | DEU (Germany) | TUR (Turkey) | GBR (United Kingdom) | CAT (Spain) | AUS (Australia) | Points |

Key
| Colour | Result |
|---|---|
| Gold | Winner |
| Silver | 2nd place |
| Bronze | 3rd place |
| Green | Points finish |
| Blue | Non-points finish |
| Blue | Non-classified finish (NC) |
| Purple | Did not finish (Ret) |
| Black | Excluded (EX) |
| Black | Disqualified (DSQ) |
| White | Did not start (DNS) |
| White | Cancelled (C) |
| Blank | Withdrew entry from the event (WD) |
