= 2019 Rally Mexico =

16th edition of Rally Mexico

2019 Rally Mexico: 16. Rally Guanajuato Mexico
Round 3 of 14 in the 2019 World Rally Championship
← Previous event	Next event →
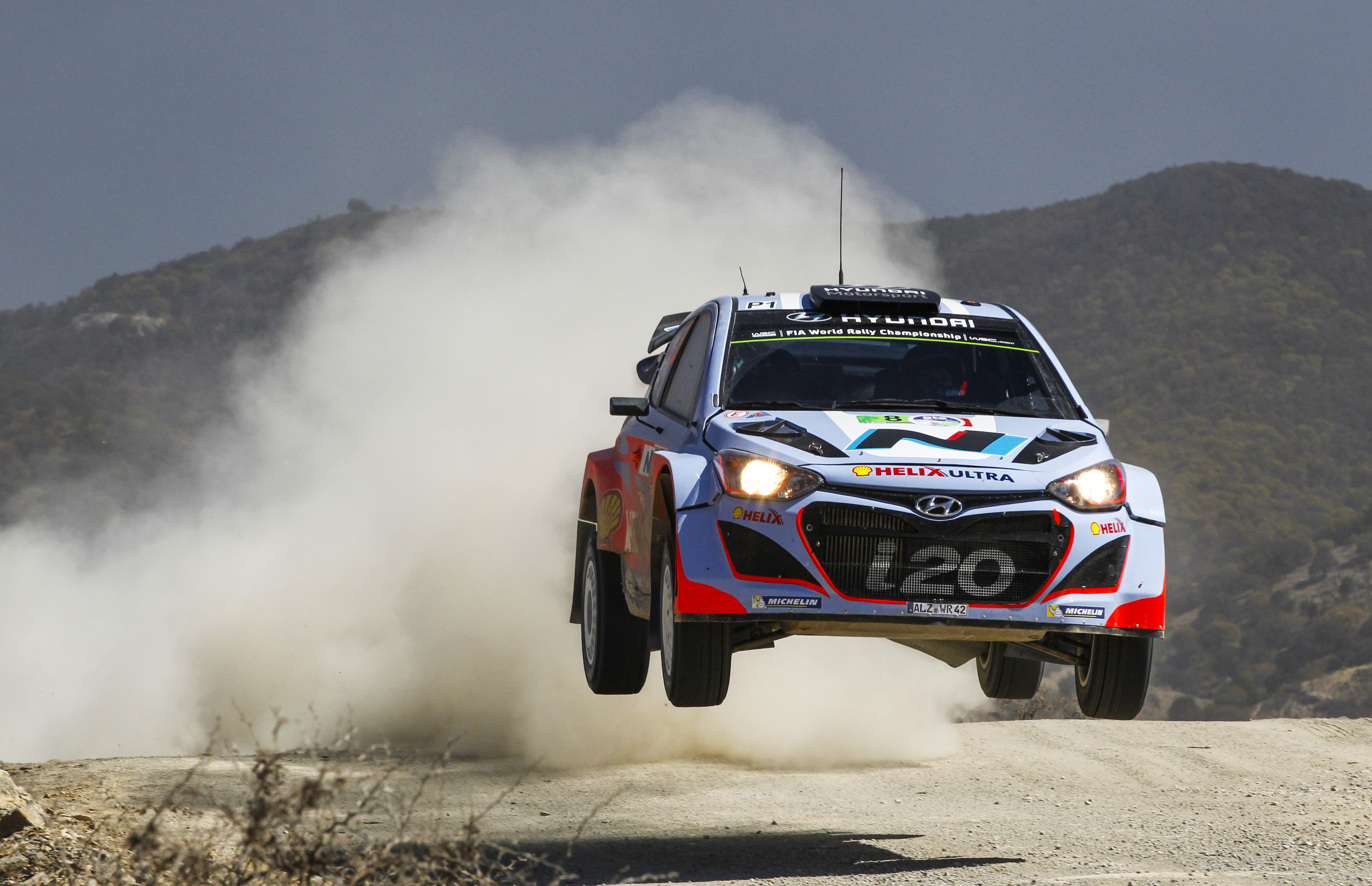
- Crews had to face the challenge of Mexico's high-altitude terrain.
- Host country: Mexico
- Rally base: León, Guanajuato
- Dates run: 7 – 10 March 2019
- Start location: Street Stage GTO, Guanajuato
- Finish location: Las Minas, Guanajuato
- Stages: 21 (316.51 km; 196.67 miles)
- Stage surface: Gravel
- Transport distance: 689.79 km (428.62 miles)
- Overall distance: 1,006.30 km (625.29 miles)

Statistics
- Crews registered: 24
- Crews: 23 at start, 15 at finish

Overall results
- Overall winner: (France) Sébastien Ogier (France) Julien Ingrassia (France) Citroën Total WRT; 3:37:08.0
- Power Stage winner: (France) Sébastien Ogier (France) Julien Ingrassia (France) Citroën Total WRT

Support category results
- WRC-2 winner: (Mexico) Benito Guerra (Mexico) Jaime Zapata (Mexico) Benito Guerra; 3:52:43.5

The 2019 Rally Mexico (also known as the Rally Guanajuato Mexico 2019) was a motor racing event for rally cars that was held over four days between 7 and 10 March 2019. It marked the sixteenth running of Rally Mexico and was the third round of the 2019 World Rally Championship, World Rally Championship-2 and the newly created WRC-2 Pro class. The 2019 event was based in the town of León in Guanajuato and consisted of twenty-one special stages. The rally covered a total competitive distance of 316.51 km (196.67 mi).

Reigning World Drivers' and World Co-Drivers Champions Sébastien Ogier and Julien Ingrassia were the defending rally winners. M-Sport Ford WRT, the team they drove for in 2018, were the defending manufacturers' winners. Pontus Tidemand and Jonas Andersson were the defending rally winners of WRC-2, but they did not participate in the event.

Ogier and Ingrassia successfully defended their titles. Their team, Citroën World Rally Team, were the manufacturers' winners. The M-Sport Ford WRT crew of Łukasz Pieniążek and Kamil Heller won the WRC-2 Pro category, while Benito Guerra and Jaime Zapata won the wider WRC-2 class, finishing first in the combined WRC-2 category.

== Background ==
=== Championship standings prior to the event ===
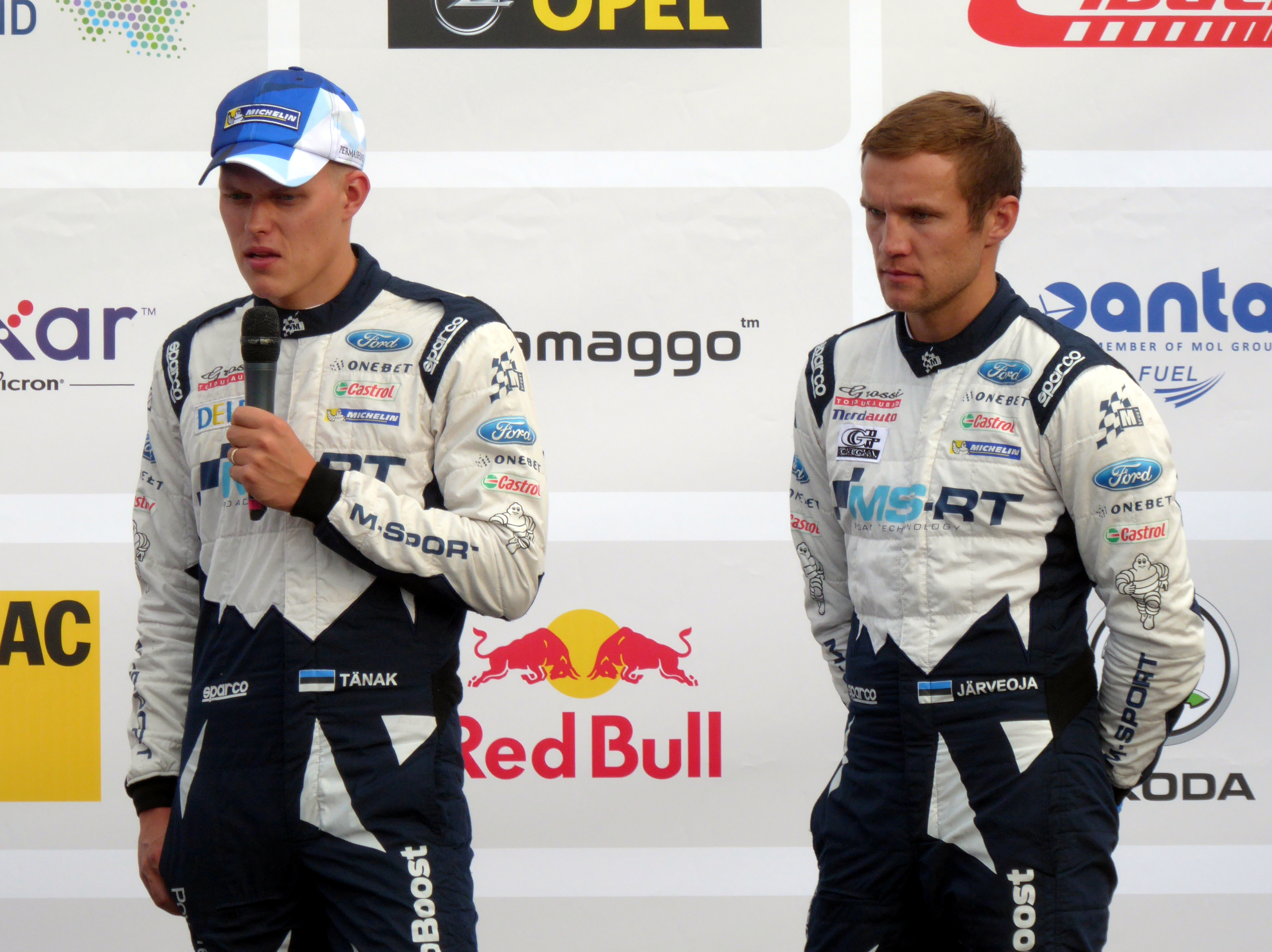
Ott Tänak (left) and Martin Järveoja (right) entered the round as the championship leaders for the first time in their career.

Ott Tänak and Martin Järveoja led both the drivers' and co-drivers' championships for the first time in their career, with a seven-point ahead of Thierry Neuville and Nicolas Gilsoul. Six-time world champions Sébastien Ogier and Julien Ingrassia were third, a further nine points behind. In the World Rally Championship for Manufacturers, defending manufacturers' champions Toyota Gazoo Racing WRT held a one-point lead over Hyundai Shell Mobis WRT.

In the World Rally Championship-2 Pro standings, Gus Greensmith and Elliott Edmondson held a four-point lead ahead of Kalle Rovanperä and Jonne Halttunen in the drivers' and co-drivers' standings respectively. Mads Østberg and Torstein Eriksen were third, eleven points further back. In the manufacturers' championship, M-Sport Ford WRT led Škoda Motorsport by sixteen points, with eleven-point-behind Citroën Total in third.

In the World Rally Championship-2 standings, Ole Christian Veiby and Jonas Andersson led the drivers' and co-drivers' standings by fifteen points respectively. Yoann Bonato and Benjamin Boulloud were second, with Adrien Fourmaux and Renaud Jamoul in third in each standings, another eight points behind.

=== Entry list ===
The following crews entered the rally. The event was open to crews competing in the World Rally Championship, World Rally Championship-2, WRC-2 Pro and privateer entries not registered to score points in any championship. A total of twenty-three entries were received, with ten crews entered with World Rally Cars and five entered the World Rally Championship-2. Only one crew was nominated to score points in the Pro class.

No.	Driver	Co-Driver	Entrant	Car	Tyre
World Rally Car entries
1	(France) Sébastien Ogier	(France) Julien Ingrassia	(France) Citroën Total WRT	Citroën C3 WRC	M
3	(Finland) Teemu Suninen	(Finland) Marko Salminen	(United Kingdom) M-Sport Ford WRT	Ford Fiesta WRC	M
4	(Finland) Esapekka Lappi	(Finland) Janne Ferm	(France) Citroën Total WRT	Citroën C3 WRC	M
5	(United Kingdom) Kris Meeke	(United Kingdom) Sebastian Marshall	(Japan) Toyota Gazoo Racing WRT	Toyota Yaris WRC	M
6	(Spain) Dani Sordo	(Spain) Carlos del Barrio	(South Korea) Hyundai Shell Mobis WRT	Hyundai i20 Coupe WRC	M
8	(Estonia) Ott Tänak	(Estonia) Martin Järveoja	(Japan) Toyota Gazoo Racing WRT	Toyota Yaris WRC	M
10	(Finland) Jari-Matti Latvala	(Finland) Miikka Anttila	(Japan) Toyota Gazoo Racing WRT	Toyota Yaris WRC	M
11	(Belgium) Thierry Neuville	(Belgium) Nicolas Gilsoul	(South Korea) Hyundai Shell Mobis WRT	Hyundai i20 Coupe WRC	M
33	(United Kingdom) Elfyn Evans	(United Kingdom) Scott Martin	(United Kingdom) M-Sport Ford WRT	Ford Fiesta WRC	M
89	(Norway) Andreas Mikkelsen	(Norway) Anders Jæger-Amland	(South Korea) Hyundai Shell Mobis WRT	Hyundai i20 Coupe WRC	M
World Rally Championship-2 Pro entries
21	(Poland) Łukasz Pieniążek	(Poland) Kamil Heller	(United Kingdom) M-Sport Ford WRT	Ford Fiesta R5	M
World Rally Championship-2 entries
41	(Mexico) Benito Guerra	(Mexico) Jaime Zapata	(Mexico) Benito Guerra (Note: Entry operated by Race Seven.)	Škoda Fabia R5	M
42	(Bolivia) Marco Bulacia Wilkinson	(Argentina) Fabian Cretu	(Bolivia) Marco Bulacia Wilkinson (Note: Entry operated by VIALCO Racing.)	Škoda Fabia R5	M
43	(Chile) Pedro Heller	(Argentina) Pablo Olmos	(Chile) Pedro Heller	Ford Fiesta R5	M
44	(Chile) Alberto Heller	(Argentina) José Díaz	(Chile) Alberto Heller	Ford Fiesta R5	M
Other notable entries
81	(Mexico) Ricardo Triviño	(Spain) Marc Martí	(Mexico) Ricardo Triviño	Škoda Fabia R5	P

=== Route ===
All the stages are located in the state of Guanajuato. Compared with the 2018 edition, the route of the 2019 edition was 27.98 km (17.39 mi) shorter. The Duarte — Derramadero stage was removed. Instead, the Mesa Cuata stage joined the itinerary.

==== Itinerary ====
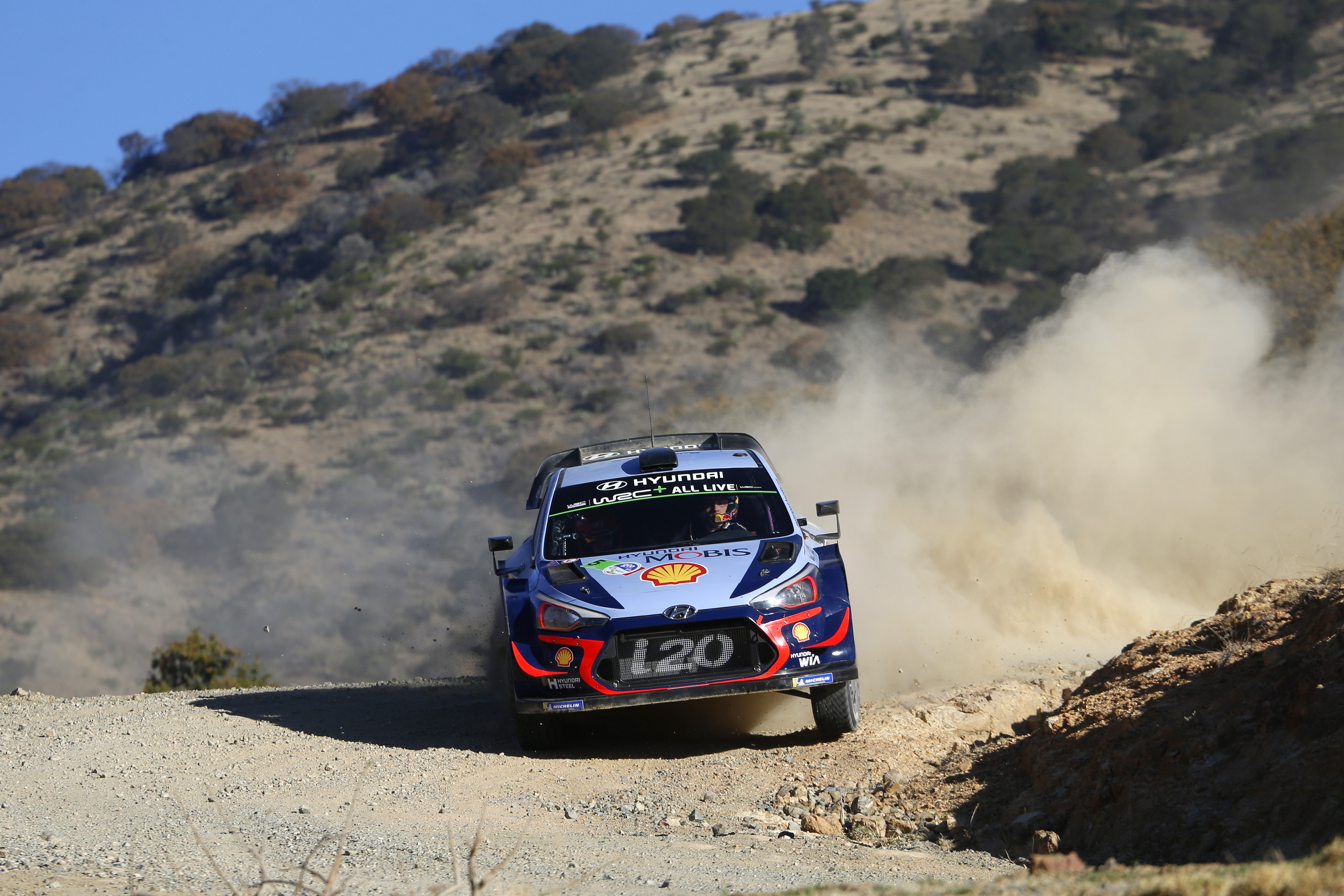
Thierry Neuville and Nicolas Gilsoul during a stage in a Hyundai i20 Coupe WRC.

All dates and times are CST (UTC-6).

Date	Time	No.	Stage name	Distance
7 March	10:00	—	Llano Grande [Shakedown]	5.31 km
Leg 1 — 115.33 km
7 March	20:08	SS1	Street Stage GTO	1.14 km
8 March	10:08	SS2	El Chocolate 1	31.57 km
8 March	11:16	SS3	Ortega 1	17.28 km
8 March	12:59	SS4	Street Stage Léon 1	1.11 km
8 March	15:17	SS5	El Chocolate 2	31.57 km
8 March	16:15	SS6	Ortega 2	17.28 km
8 March	17:18	SS7	Las Minas 1	10.72 km
8 March	18:58	SS8	V-Power Shell Stage 1	2.33 km
8 March	19:03	SS9	V-Power Shell Stage 2	2.33 km
Leg 2 — 138.37 km
9 March	8:23	SS10	Guanajuatito 1	25.90 km
9 March	10:06	SS11	Otates 1	32.27 km
9 March	11:08	SS12	El Brinco 1	8.13 km
9 March	14:31	SS13	Guanajuatito 2	25.90 km
9 March	16:29	SS14	Otates 2	32.27 km
9 March	17:38	SS15	El Brinco 2	8.13 km
9 March	19:03	SS16	V-Power Shell Stage 3	2.33 km
9 March	19:08	SS17	V-Power Shell Stage 4	2.33 km
9 March	19:51	SS18	Street Stage Léon 2	1.11 km
Leg 3 — 60.17 km
10 March	9:03	SS19	Alfaro	24.38 km
10 March	10:11	SS20	Mesa Cuata	25.07 km
10 March	12:18	SS21	Las Minas 2 [Power Stage]	10.72 km

== Report ==
=== World Rally Cars ===
The 2019 edition of Rally Mexico started with a curtailment of the opening stage due to an irreparable damaged jump. Andreas Mikkelsen took a short-lived lead on Friday morning, but the Norwegian lost his lead to Sébastien Ogier as they hit a rock and damaged the suspension. Teammate Dani Sordo also forced to retire from the day due to electrical issue. Jari-Matti Latvala was running in fourth before retiring with alternator failure. The other major retirement of the first leg was Teemu Suninen, who went off the road in his Fiesta. The young Finn retired from the rally in the end.

It turned out that Ogier was a lucky man. Despite a front-left puncture, he still reduced his time loss to just twenty seconds as his teammate Esapekka Lappi went off the road and caused the red flag, which saved his rally-winning chances. However, Kris Meeke wasn't as fortunate, as he suffered a puncture on the following Otates stage, with damaged suspension, which dropped him from the lead down to fifth place. Eventually, Ogier net his fifth Mexico victory with a power stage victory, surpassed Thierry Neuville in the drivers' standings in second, narrowing to four points off the championship leader Ott Tänak, who finished second overall, with Elfyn Evans got his first podium finish of the season.

The rally was not without controversy however. The damaged ramp was met with criticism, deeming it to be unnecessarily dangerous to both drivers and spectators, and allegations of cheating surfaced with Kris Meeke accusing Citroen of abusing red flag rules to give Ogier an unfair advantage; Meeke would later retract his statement in an apology.

==== Classification ====
Position		No.	Driver	Co-driver	Entrant	Car	Time	Difference	Points	
Event	Class	No.	Driver	Co-driver	Entrant	Car	Time	Difference	Event	Stage
1	1	1	Sébastien Ogier	Julien Ingrassia	Citroën Total WRT	Citroën C3 WRC	3:37:08.0	0.0	25	5
2	2	8	Ott Tänak	Martin Järveoja	Toyota Gazoo Racing WRT	Toyota Yaris WRC	3:37:38.2	+30.2	18	0
3	3	33	Elfyn Evans	Scott Martin	M-Sport Ford WRT	Ford Fiesta WRC	3:37:57.9	+49.9	15	0
4	4	11	Thierry Neuville	Nicolas Gilsoul	Hyundai Shell Mobis WRT	Hyundai i20 Coupe WRC	3:38:35.0	+1:27.0	12	3
5	5	5	Kris Meeke	Sebastian Marshall	Toyota Gazoo Racing WRT	Toyota Yaris WRC	3:43:14.2	+6:06.2	10	4
8	6	10	Jari-Matti Latvala	Miikka Anttila	Toyota Gazoo Racing WRT	Toyota Yaris WRC	3:56:03.9	+18:55.9	4	0
9	7	6	Dani Sordo	Carlos del Barrio	Hyundai Shell Mobis WRT	Hyundai i20 Coupe WRC	3:59:52.1	+22:44.1	2	2
13	8	4	Esapekka Lappi	Janne Ferm	Citroën Total WRT	Citroën C3 WRC	4:40:48.5	+1:03:40.5	0	1
Retired SS21		89	Andreas Mikkelsen	Anders Jæger-Amland	Hyundai Shell Mobis WRT	Hyundai i20 Coupe WRC	Withdrawn		0	0
Retired SS2		3	Teemu Suninen	Marko Salminen	M-Sport Ford WRT	Ford Fiesta WRC	Accident		0	0

==== Special stages ====
Date	No.	Stage name	Distance	Winners	Car	Time	Class leaders
7 March	—	Llano Grande [Shakedown]	5.31 km	Meeke / Marshall	Toyota Yaris WRC	3:44.2	—N/a
7 March	SS1	Street Stage GTO	1.14 km	Lappi / Ferm (Note: Crews who did not start were awarded a notional time based on that of Kris Meeke and Sebastian Marshall, the last crew to complete the test before it was stopped with an 1:01.2.)	Citroën C3 WRC	1:00.6	Lappi / Ferm
8 March	SS2	El Chocolate 1	31.57 km	Mikkelsen / Jæger-Amland	Hyundai i20 Coupe WRC	23:50.6	Mikkelsen / Jæger-Amland
8 March	SS3	Ortega 1	17.28 km	Ogier / Ingrassia	Citroën C3 WRC	9:29.0	Mikkelsen / Jæger-Amland
8 March	SS4	Street Stage Léon 1	1.11 km	Mikkelsen / Jæger-Amland	Hyundai i20 Coupe WRC	1:04.9	Mikkelsen / Jæger-Amland
8 March	SS5	El Chocolate 2	31.57 km	Ogier / Ingrassia	Citroën C3 WRC	23:35.0	Ogier / Ingrassia
8 March	SS6	Ortega 2	17.28 km	Ogier / Ingrassia	Citroën C3 WRC	9:22.3	Ogier / Ingrassia
8 March	SS7	Las Minas 1	10.72 km	Tänak / Järveoja	Toyota Yaris WRC	6:43.4	Ogier / Ingrassia
8 March	SS8	V-Power Shell Stage 1	2.33 km	Ogier / Ingrassia	Citroën C3 WRC	1:39.0	Ogier / Ingrassia
8 March	SS9	V-Power Shell Stage 2	2.33 km	Neuville / Gilsoul; Tänak / Järveoja	Hyundai i20 Coupe WRC; Toyota Yaris WRC	1:38.3	Ogier / Ingrassia
9 March	SS10	Guanajuatito 1	25.90 km	Meeke / Marshall	Toyota Yaris WRC	17:44.9	Meeke / Marshall
9 March	SS11	Otates 1	32.27 km	Latvala / Anttila	Toyota Yaris WRC	24:42.6	Ogier / Ingrassia
9 March	SS12	El Brinco 1	8.13 km	Ogier / Ingrassia; Latvala / Anttila	Citroën C3 WRC; Toyota Yaris WRC	4:40.0	Ogier / Ingrassia
9 March	SS13	Guanajuatito 2	25.90 km	Ogier / Ingrassia	Citroën C3 WRC	17:33.6	Ogier / Ingrassia
9 March	SS14	Otates 2	32.27 km	Tänak / Järveoja	Toyota Yaris WRC	24:25.2	Ogier / Ingrassia
9 March	SS15	El Brinco 2	8.13 km	Tänak / Järveoja	Toyota Yaris WRC	4:36.6	Ogier / Ingrassia
9 March	SS16	V-Power Shell Stage 3	2.33 km	Mikkelsen / Jæger-Amland	Hyundai i20 Coupe WRC	1:39.4	Ogier / Ingrassia
9 March	SS17	V-Power Shell Stage 4	2.33 km	Neuville / Gilsoul	Hyundai i20 Coupe WRC	1:38.5	Ogier / Ingrassia
9 March	SS18	Street Stage Léon 2	1.11 km	Sordo / del Barrio	Hyundai i20 Coupe WRC	1:04.4	Ogier / Ingrassia
10 March	SS19	Alfaro	24.38 km	Tänak / Järveoja	Toyota Yaris WRC	13:52.6	Ogier / Ingrassia
10 March	SS20	Mesa Cuata	25.07 km	Tänak / Järveoja	Toyota Yaris WRC	19:18.8	Ogier / Ingrassia
10 March	SS21	Las Minas 2 [Power Stage]	10.72 km	Ogier / Ingrassia	Citroën C3 WRC	6:30.4	Ogier / Ingrassia

==== Championship standings ====
Pos.	Drivers' championships			Co-drivers' championships			Manufacturers' championships		
Pos.	Move	Driver	Points	Move	Co-driver	Points	Move	Manufacturer	Points
1		Ott Tänak	65		Martin Järveoja	65		Toyota Gazoo Racing WRT	86
2	1	Sébastien Ogier	61	1	Julien Ingrassia	61	1	Citroën Total WRT	78
3	1	Thierry Neuville	55	1	Nicolas Gilsoul	55	1	Hyundai Shell Mobis WRT	77
4		Kris Meeke	35		Sebastian Marshall	35		M-Sport Ford WRT	45
5	2	Elfyn Evans	28	2	Scott Martin	28			

=== World Rally Championship-2 Pro ===
The only WRC-2 Pro driver Łukasz Pieniążek was unable to complete Friday as he crashed out in SS6. After re-entering the rally, he enjoyed a trouble-free day and eventually won the category.

==== Classification ====
Position		No.	Driver	Co-driver	Entrant	Car	Time	Difference	Points	
Event	Class	No.	Driver	Co-driver	Entrant	Car	Time	Difference	Class	Event
11	1	21	Łukasz Pieniążek	Kamil Heller	M-Sport Ford WRT	Ford Fiesta R5	4:22:31.1	0.0	**25**	**0**

==== Special stages ====
Results in bold denote first in the RC2 class, the class which both the WRC-2 Pro and WRC-2 championships run to.

Date	No.	Stage name	Distance	Winners	Car	Time	Class leaders
7 March	—	Llano Grande [Shakedown]	5.31 km	Pieniążek / Heller	Ford Fiesta R5	4:04.8	—N/a
7 March	SS1	Street Stage GTO	1.14 km	Pieniążek / Heller	Ford Fiesta R5	1:06.0	Pieniążek / Heller
8 March	SS2	El Chocolate 1	31.57 km	Pieniążek / Heller	Ford Fiesta R5	25:33.4	Pieniążek / Heller
8 March	SS3	Ortega 1	17.28 km	Pieniążek / Heller	Ford Fiesta R5	10:27.4	Pieniążek / Heller
8 March	SS4	Street Stage Léon 1	1.11 km	Pieniążek / Heller	Ford Fiesta R5	1:12.0	Pieniążek / Heller
8 March	SS5	El Chocolate 2	31.57 km	Pieniążek / Heller	Ford Fiesta R5	25:19.2	Pieniążek / Heller
8 March	SS6	Ortega 2	17.28 km	No stage winner		—N/a	No leader (Note: Łukasz Pieniążek and Kamil Heller retired from the day in SS6. They re-entered at the start of the second leg. As theirs was the only WRC 2-Pro entry, there was no stage winner or class leader from SS6 to SS10.)
8 March	SS7	Las Minas 1	10.72 km	No stage winner		—N/a	No leader
8 March	SS8	V-Power Shell Stage 1	2.33 km	No stage winner		—N/a	No leader
8 March	SS9	V-Power Shell Stage 2	2.33 km	No stage winner		—N/a	No leader
9 March	SS10	Guanajuatito 1	25.90 km	Stage interrupted (Note: The car of Esapekka Lappi and Janne Ferm was stuck in a dangerous spot, which caused the stage to be interrupted. As a result, all cars except World Rally Cars were given a 31:51.7 to their times.)			
9 March	SS11	Otates 1	32.27 km	Pieniążek / Heller	Ford Fiesta R5	26:37.5	Pieniążek / Heller
9 March	SS12	El Brinco 1	8.13 km	Pieniążek / Heller	Ford Fiesta R5	5:19.0	Pieniążek / Heller
9 March	SS13	Guanajuatito 2	25.90 km	Pieniążek / Heller	Ford Fiesta R5	19:25.6	Pieniążek / Heller
9 March	SS14	Otates 2	32.27 km	Pieniążek / Heller	Ford Fiesta R5	26:28.5	Pieniążek / Heller
9 March	SS15	El Brinco 2	8.13 km	Pieniążek / Heller	Ford Fiesta R5	5:09.2	Pieniążek / Heller
9 March	SS16	V-Power Shell Stage 3	2.33 km	Pieniążek / Heller	Ford Fiesta R5	1:47.0	Pieniążek / Heller
9 March	SS17	V-Power Shell Stage 4	2.33 km	Pieniążek / Heller	Ford Fiesta R5	1:45.8	Pieniążek / Heller
9 March	SS18	Street Stage Léon 2	1.11 km	Pieniążek / Heller	Ford Fiesta R5	1:08.4	Pieniążek / Heller
10 March	SS19	Alfaro	24.38 km	Pieniążek / Heller	Ford Fiesta R5	15:06.5	Pieniążek / Heller
10 March	SS20	Mesa Cuata	25.07 km	Pieniążek / Heller	Ford Fiesta R5	20:38.5	Pieniążek / Heller
10 March	SS21	Las Minas 2	10.72 km	Pieniążek / Heller	Ford Fiesta R5	7:11.7	Pieniążek / Heller

==== Championship standings ====
Pos.	Drivers' championships			Co-drivers' championships			Manufacturers' championships		
Pos.	Move	Driver	Points	Move	Co-driver	Points	Move	Manufacturer	Points
1		Gus Greensmith	40		Elliott Edmondson	40		M-Sport Ford WRT	77
2	2	Łukasz Pieniążek	37	2	Kamil Heller	37		Škoda Motorsport	36
3	1	Kalle Rovanperä	36	1	Jonne Halttunen	36		Citroën Total	25
4	1	Mads Østberg	25	1	Torstein Eriksen	25			
5		Eerik Pietarinen	0		Juhana Raitanen	0			

=== World Rally Championship-2 ===
Eighteen-year-old driver Marco Bulacia Wilkinson edged Benito Guerra in 9.8 seconds. The two dominated the category in two Fabia R5s as they won all eight stages of Friday combined. On the leg 2, Guerra surpassed Wilkinson and ended the day with a lead over three and a half minutes. Heller brothers both failed to finished the day. Alberto Heller retired with broken steering, while Pedro Heller retired with a mechanical issue. They restarted in the final leg, but Pedro Heller retired from the rally because of a mechanical issue. The event went into Guerra's pocket in the end, which is his first home victory in his career.

==== Classification ====
Position		No.	Driver	Co-driver	Entrant	Car	Time	Difference	Points	
Event	Class	No.	Driver	Co-driver	Entrant	Car	Time	Difference	Class	Event
6	1	41	Benito Guerra	Jaime Zapata	Benito Guerra	Škoda Fabia R5	3:52:43.5	0.0	**25**	**8**
7	2	42	Marco Bulacia Wilkinson	Fabian Cretu	Marco Bulacia Wilkinson	Škoda Fabia R5	3:55:59.5	+3:16.0	**18**	**6**
13	3	44	Alberto Heller	José Díaz	Alberto Heller	Ford Fiesta R5	4:29:50.2	+37:06.7	**15**	**0**
Retired SS20		43	Pedro Heller	Pablo Olmos	Pedro Heller	Ford Fiesta R5	Mechanical		**0**	**0**

==== Special stages ====
Results in bold denote first in the RC2 class, the class which both the WRC-2 Pro and WRC-2 championships run to.

Date	No.	Stage name	Distance	Winners	Car	Time	Class leaders
7 March	—	Llano Grande [Shakedown]	5.31 km	**Guerra / Zapata**	Škoda Fabia R5	3:59.9	—N/a
7 March	SS1	Street Stage GTO	1.14 km	**Heller / Díaz**	Ford Fiesta R5	1:05.9	Heller / Díaz
8 March	SS2	El Chocolate 1	31.57 km	**Bulacia Wilkinson / Cretu**	Škoda Fabia R5	25:12.5	Bulacia Wilkinson / Cretu
8 March	SS3	Ortega 1	17.28 km	**Guerra / Zapata**	Škoda Fabia R5	10:16.1	Guerra / Zapata
8 March	SS4	Street Stage Léon 1	1.11 km	**Bulacia Wilkinson / Cretu**	Škoda Fabia R5	1:08.3	Bulacia Wilkinson / Cretu
8 March	SS5	El Chocolate 2	31.57 km	**Bulacia Wilkinson / Cretu**	Škoda Fabia R5	24:59.6	Bulacia Wilkinson / Cretu
8 March	SS6	Ortega 2	17.28 km	**Bulacia Wilkinson / Cretu**	Škoda Fabia R5	10:17.6	Bulacia Wilkinson / Cretu
8 March	SS7	Las Minas 1	10.72 km	**Bulacia Wilkinson / Cretu**	Škoda Fabia R5	7:15.3	Bulacia Wilkinson / Cretu
8 March	SS8	V-Power Shell Stage 1	2.33 km	**Guerra / Zapata**	Škoda Fabia R5	1:45.6	Bulacia Wilkinson / Cretu
8 March	SS9	V-Power Shell Stage 2	2.33 km	**Guerra / Zapata**	Škoda Fabia R5	1:44.3	Bulacia Wilkinson / Cretu
9 March	SS10	Guanajuatito 1	25.90 km	Stage interrupted			
9 March	SS11	Otates 1	32.27 km	**Guerra / Zapata**	Škoda Fabia R5	26:12.9	Guerra / Zapata
9 March	SS12	El Brinco 1	8.13 km	**Guerra / Zapata**	Škoda Fabia R5	5:02.7	Guerra / Zapata
9 March	SS13	Guanajuatito 2	25.90 km	**Guerra / Zapata**	Škoda Fabia R5	18:55.3	Guerra / Zapata
9 March	SS14	Otates 2	32.27 km	**Bulacia Wilkinson / Cretu**	Škoda Fabia R5	26:11.3	Guerra / Zapata
9 March	SS15	El Brinco 2	8.13 km	**Guerra / Zapata**	Škoda Fabia R5	5:02.8	Guerra / Zapata
9 March	SS16	V-Power Shell Stage 3	2.33 km	**Guerra / Zapata**	Škoda Fabia R5	1:45.1	Guerra / Zapata
9 March	SS17	V-Power Shell Stage 4	2.33 km	**Bulacia Wilkinson / Cretu**	Škoda Fabia R5	1:44.7	Guerra / Zapata
9 March	SS18	Street Stage Léon 2	1.11 km	**Bulacia Wilkinson / Cretu**	Škoda Fabia R5	1:07.4	Guerra / Zapata
10 March	SS19	Alfaro	24.38 km	**Bulacia Wilkinson / Cretu**	Škoda Fabia R5	14:56.4	Guerra / Zapata
10 March	SS20	Mesa Cuata	25.07 km	**Bulacia Wilkinson / Cretu**	Škoda Fabia R5	20:23.2	Guerra / Zapata
10 March	SS21	Las Minas 2	10.72 km	**Guerra / Zapata**	Škoda Fabia R5	7:11.1	Guerra / Zapata

==== Championship standings ====
Pos.	Drivers' championships			Co-drivers' championships		
Pos.	Move	Driver	Points	Move	Co-driver	Points
1		Ole Christian Veiby	40		Jonas Andersson	40
2		Yoann Bonato	25		Benjamin Boulloud	25
3		Benito Guerra	25		Jaime Zapata	25
4	1	Adrien Fourmaux	18	1	Renaud Jamoul	18
5	1	Emil Bergkvist	18	1	Patrik Barth	18

== Notes ==
Previous rally: 2019 Rally Sweden	2019 FIA World Rally Championship	Next rally: 2019 Tour de Corse
Previous rally: 2018 Rally Mexico	2019 Rally Mexico	Next rally: 2020 Rally Mexico
