= 2019 Rally Australia =

28th edition of Rally Australia

2019 Rally Australia: 28. Kennards Hire Rally Australia
Round 14 of 14 in the 2019 World Rally Championship
← Previous event
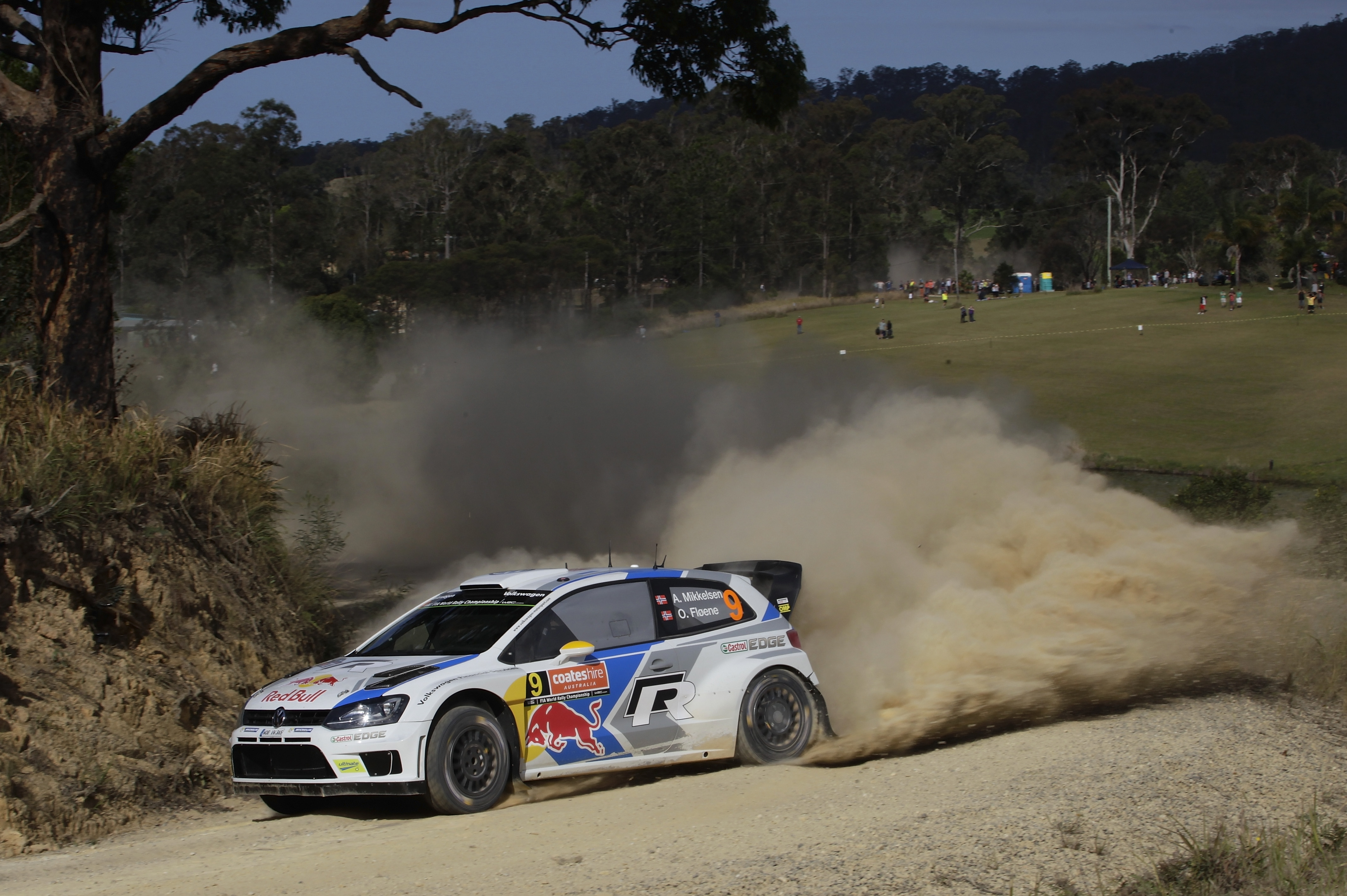
- Rally Australia marks the end of the 2019 season.
- Host country: Australia
- Rally base: Coffs Harbour, New South Wales
- Dates run: 14 – 17 November 2019
- Start location: Coffs Harbour, New South Wales
- Finish location: Coramba, New South Wales
- Stages: 25 (324.53 km; 201.65 miles)
- Stage surface: Gravel
- Transport distance: 759.47 km (471.91 miles)
- Overall distance: 1,084.00 km (673.57 miles)

Statistics
- Crews registered: 26
- Cancellation: Rally cancelled due to bushfires.

The 2019 Rally Australia (also known as Kennards Hire Rally Australia 2019) was a motor racing event for rally cars that was scheduled to be held over four days between 14 and 17 November 2019. The event was cancelled because of an ongoing bushfire emergency in the area. The event was to mark the twenty-eighth running of Rally Australia and was the final round of the 2019 World Rally Championship, WRC-2 Pro class and World Rally Championship-2. The 2019 event would have been based in Coffs Harbour in New South Wales, and contested over twenty-five special stages with a total a competitive distance of 324.53 km (201.65 mi). Rally Australia will not be featured in the 2020 championship.

Jari-Matti Latvala and Miikka Anttila were the defending rally winners. Their team, Toyota Gazoo Racing WRT, were the defending manufacturers' winners. Alberto Heller and José Diaz were the defending rally winners in the World Rally Championship-2 category, but did not participate in the event.

As a result of the rally's cancellation, Hyundai Shell Mobis WRT became the manufacturers' champions, while Pierre-Louis Loubet and Vincent Landais won the drivers' and co-drivers' titles respectively in the WRC-2 class.

== Background ==
=== Championship standings prior to the event ===
Newly crowned champions Ott Tänak and Martin Järveoja led the both drivers' and co-drivers' championships with a thirty-six-point ahead of Thierry Neuville and Nicolas Gilsoul. Defending world champions Sébastien Ogier and Julien Ingrassia were third, a further ten points behind. In the World Rally Championship for Manufacturers, Hyundai Shell Mobis WRT held an eighteen-point lead over Toyota Gazoo Racing WRT.

In the World Rally Championship-2 Pro standings, newly crowned champions Kalle Rovanperä and Jonne Halttunen led by sixty-one points in the drivers' and co-drivers' standings respectively. Mads Østberg and Torstein Eriksen were second, with Gus Greensmith and Elliott Edmondson further eight points behind in third. In the manufacturers' championship, manufacturers' champion Škoda Motorsport led M-Sport Ford WRT by seventy-four points, with Citroën Total over a hundred points behind in third.

In the World Rally Championship-2 standings, Pierre-Louis Loubet and Vincent Landais led the drivers' and co-drivers' standings by three points respectively. Kajetan Kajetanowicz and Maciej Szczepaniak were second, while Benito Guerra were third in the drivers' standings and Yaroslav Fedorov in the co-drivers' standings.

=== Entry list ===
The following crews were due to entered into the rally. The event was scheduled to open to crews competing in the World Rally Championship, World Rally Championship-2, WRC-2 Pro and privateer entries not registered to score points in any championship. A total of twenty-six entries were received, with twelve crews were scheduled to enter with World Rally Cars and three were scheduled to enter the World Rally Championship-2. This was later reduced to eleven World Rally Cars when Citroën withdrew a planned entry for Mads Østberg and Torstein Eriksen.

No.	Driver	Co-driver	Entrant	Car	Tyre
World Rally Car entries
1	(France) Sébastien Ogier	(France) Julien Ingrassia	(France) Citroën Total WRT	Citroën C3 WRC	MI
3	(Finland) Teemu Suninen	(Finland) Jarmo Lehtinen	(United Kingdom) M-Sport Ford WRT	Ford Fiesta WRC	MI
4	(Finland) Esapekka Lappi	(Finland) Janne Ferm	(France) Citroën Total WRT	Citroën C3 WRC	MI
5	(United Kingdom) Kris Meeke	(United Kingdom) Sebastian Marshall	(Japan) Toyota Gazoo Racing WRT	Toyota Yaris WRC	MI
6	(Spain) Dani Sordo	(Spain) Carlos del Barrio	(South Korea) Hyundai Shell Mobis WRT	Hyundai i20 Coupe WRC	MI
8	(Estonia) Ott Tänak	(Estonia) Martin Järveoja	(Japan) Toyota Gazoo Racing WRT	Toyota Yaris WRC	MI
10	(Finland) Jari-Matti Latvala	(Finland) Miikka Anttila	(Japan) Toyota Gazoo Racing WRT	Toyota Yaris WRC	MI
11	(Belgium) Thierry Neuville	(Belgium) Nicolas Gilsoul	(South Korea) Hyundai Shell Mobis WRT	Hyundai i20 Coupe WRC	MI
18	(Republic of Ireland) Craig Breen	(Republic of Ireland) Paul Nagle	(South Korea) Hyundai Shell Mobis WRT	Hyundai i20 Coupe WRC	MI
20	(New Zealand) Hayden Paddon	(New Zealand) John Kennard	(United Kingdom) M-Sport Ford WRT	Ford Fiesta WRC	MI
33	(United Kingdom) Elfyn Evans	(United Kingdom) Scott Martin	(United Kingdom) M-Sport Ford WRT	Ford Fiesta WRC	MI
World Rally Championship-2 entries
41	(France) Pierre-Louis Loubet	(France) Vincent Landais	(France) Pierre-Louis Loubet (Note: Entry operated by Qatar 2C World Rally Team.)	Škoda Fabia R5	MI
42	(Mexico) Benito Guerra	(Spain) Daniel Cué	(Mexico) Benito Guerra (Note: Entry operated by Race Seven.)	Škoda Fabia R5	MI
45	(India) Gaurav Gill	(Australia) Glenn Macneall	(India) Gaurav Gill	Ford Fiesta R5 Mk. II	MI

=== Route ===
Only five stages from the 2018 event were scheduled to return to the 2019 itinerary. Two of these were due to run in opposite direction to the 2018 rally.

==== Planned itinerary ====
All dates and times are AEDT (UTC+11).

Date	Time	No.	Stage name	Distance
14 November	8:00	—	Eastbank [Shakedown]	5.09 km
Leg 1 — 125.88 km
14 November	16:30	SS1	Destination NSW SSS19 1	1.33 km
14 November	16:40	SS2	Destination NSW SSS19 2	1.33 km
15 November	9:00	SS3	Coldwater19 1	16.78 km
15 November	9:48	SS4	Sherwood 1	26.68 km
15 November	10:51	SS5	Kookaburra Rd 1	16.82 km
15 November	13:36	SS6	Coldwater19 2	16.78 km
15 November	14:24	SS7	Sherwood 2	26.68 km
15 November	15:27	SS8	Kookaburra Rd 2	16.82 km
15 November	17:00	SS9	Destination NSW SSS19 3	1.33 km
15 November	17:10	SS10	Destination NSW SSS19 4	1.33 km
Leg 2 — 116.99 km
16 November	8:33	SS11	Northbank Reverse 1	8.00 km
16 November	9:12	SS12	Utungun Reverse 1	7.54 km
16 November	10:08	SS13	Argents Hill Reverse 1	13.13 km
16 November	10:51	SS14	Welshs Creek Reverse 1	28.83 km
16 November	12:14	SS15	Raleigh	1.99 km
16 November	15:08	SS16	Argents Hill Reverse 2	13.13 km
16 November	16:00	SS17	Welshs Creek Reverse 2	28.83 km
16 November	17:13	SS18	Northbank Reverse 2	8.00 km
16 November	17:52	SS19	Utungun Reverse 2	7.54 km
Leg 3 — 81.66 km
17 November	7:03	SS20	Mount Coramba 1	19.05 km
17 November	7:47	SS21	Lower Bucca 1	11.47 km
17 November	8:38	SS22	Wedding Bells19 1	10.31 km
17 November	11:06	SS23	Mount Coramba 2	19.05 km
17 November	11:50	SS24	Lower Bucca 2	11.47 km
17 November	13:08	SS25	Wedding Bells19 2 [Power Stage]	10.31 km

=== Bushfire emergency ===
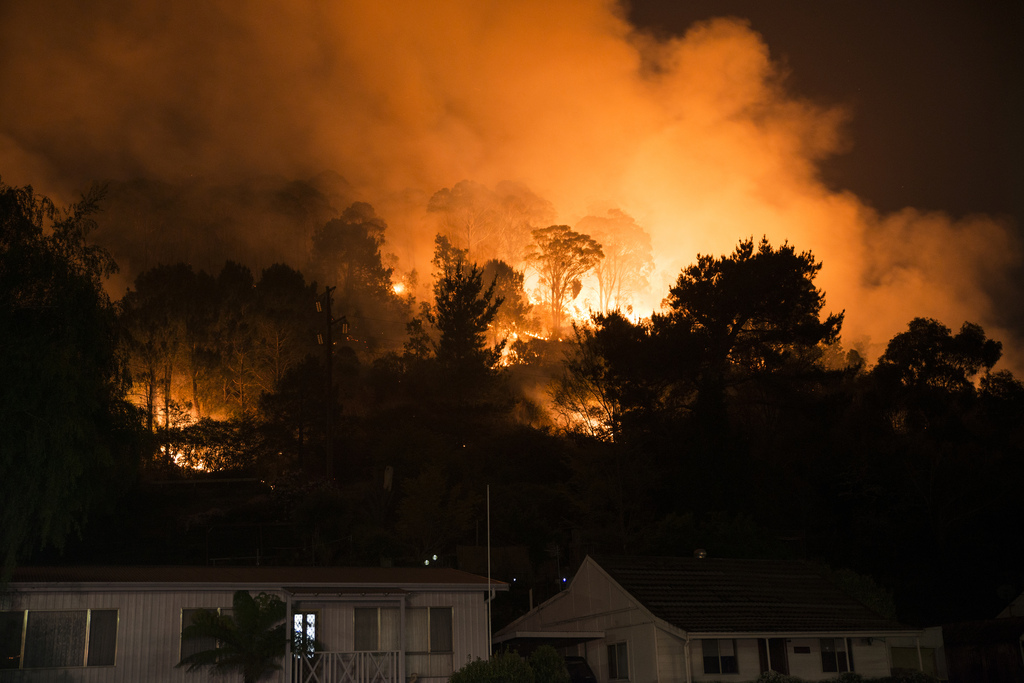
Bushfires in New South Wales led to the cancellation of the rally.

In the week before the rally, the New South Wales Mid North Coast region was devastated by unprecedented bushfires. Organisers of the rally announced plans to run the event over a shortened route if conditions deteriorated further, while organisers of the Australian Rally Championship — of which Rally Australia was planned to be the final round — cancelled the series' involvement in the rally. A revised itinerary featuring 90 km (55.9 mi) of competitive stages was submitted to the FIA for approval. However, the rally was cancelled eventually.

== Report ==
=== World Rally Cars ===
==== Championship standings ====
- **Bold text** indicates 2019 World Champions.

Pos.	Drivers' championships			Co-drivers' championships			Manufacturers' championships		
Pos.	Move	Driver	Points	Move	Co-driver	Points	Move	Manufacturer	Points
1		**Ott Tänak**	263		**Martin Järveoja**	263		**Hyundai Shell Mobis WRT**	380
2		Thierry Neuville	227		Nicolas Gilsoul	227		Toyota Gazoo Racing WRT	362
3		Sébastien Ogier	217		Julien Ingrassia	217		Citroën Total WRT	284
4		Andreas Mikkelsen	102		Anders Jæger-Amland	102		M-Sport Ford WRT	218
5		Elfyn Evans	102		Scott Martin	102			

=== World Rally Championship-2 Pro ===
==== Championship standings ====
- **Bold text** indicates 2019 World Champions.

Pos.	Drivers' championships			Co-drivers' championships			Manufacturers' championships		
Pos.	Move	Driver	Points	Move	Co-driver	Points	Move	Manufacturer	Points
1		**Kalle Rovanperä**	206		**Jonne Halttunen**	206		**Škoda Motorsport**	333
2		Mads Østberg	145		Torstein Eriksen	145		M-Sport Ford WRT	259
3		Gus Greensmith	137		Elliott Edmondson	137		Citroën Total	145
4		Jan Kopecký	115		Pavel Dresler	79			
5		Łukasz Pieniążek	74		Kamil Heller	62			

=== World Rally Championship-2 ===
==== Championship standings ====
- **Bold text** indicates 2019 World Champions.

Pos.	Drivers' championships			Co-drivers' championships		
Pos.	Move	Driver	Points	Move	Co-driver	Points
1		**Pierre-Louis Loubet**	91		**Vincent Landais**	91
2		Kajetan Kajetanowicz	88		Maciej Szczepaniak	88
3		Benito Guerra	75		Yaroslav Fedorov	73
4		Nikolay Gryazin	73		Jaime Zapata	69
5		Fabio Andolfi	64		Jonas Andersson	62

== Notes ==
Previous rally: 2019 Rally Catalunya	2019 FIA World Rally Championship	Next rally: 2020 Monte Carlo Rally (2020)
Previous rally: 2018 Rally Australia	2019 Rally Australia	Next rally: TBD
