= 2019 WRC2 Championship =

The 2019 FIA WRC2 Championship was the seventh season of WRC2, a rallying championship organised and governed by the Fédération Internationale de l'Automobile, running in support of the World Rally Championship. The championship is open to cars complying with R5 regulations.

The 2019 season saw the creation of a new category within the championship, known as WRC2 Pro. This was open to manufacturer entries competing in cars built to R5 specifications, while the wider WRC2 Championship was open to privately entered cars.

== Calendar ==
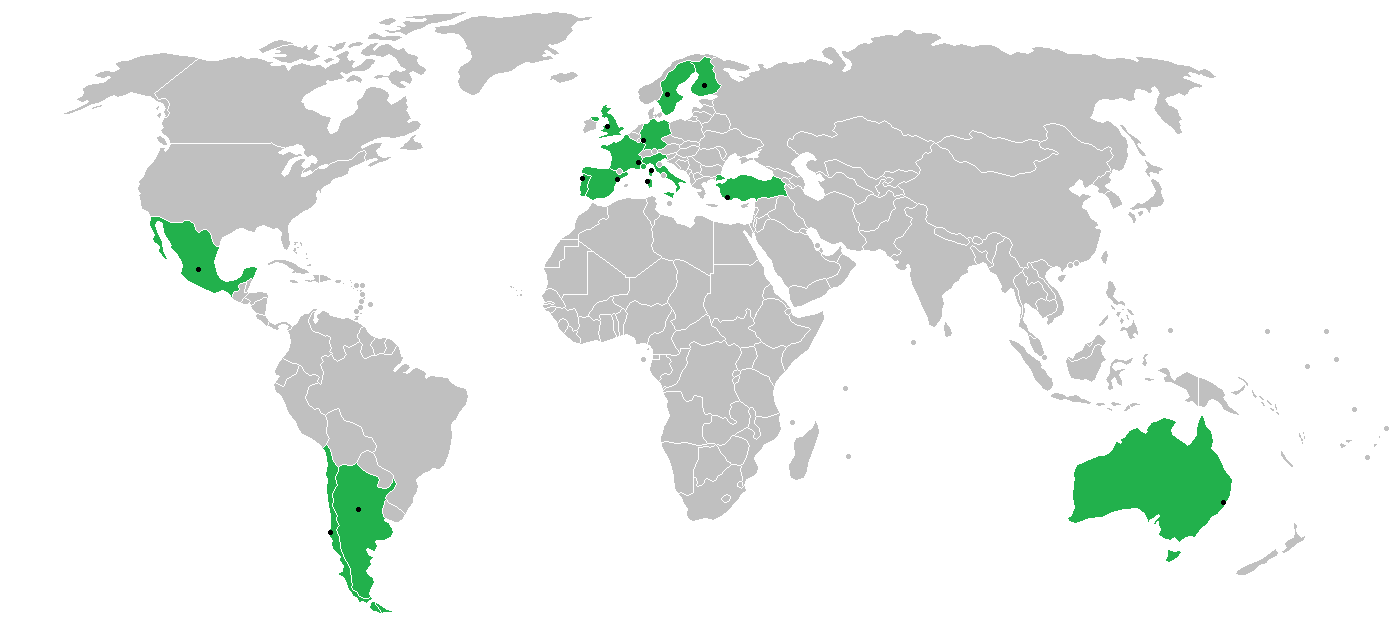
A map showing the locations of the rallies in the 2019 championship. Event headquarters are marked with a black dot.

The championship was contested over fourteen rounds in Europe, the Middle East, North and South America, and Australia.

| Round | Dates | | Rally | Rally headquarters | Rally details | | |
| Round | Start | Finish | Rally | Rally headquarters | Surface | Stages | Distance |
|---|---|---|---|---|---|---|---|
| 1 | 24 January | 27 January | (Monaco) Rallye Automobile Monte Carlo | Gap, Provence-Alpes-Côte d'Azur (Note: The rally base of the Monte Carlo Rally was located in France.) | Mixed (Note: The Monte Carlo Rally was run on a tarmac and snow surface.) | 16 (Note: The third stage of the rally was cancelled on safety grounds when spectator areas became overcrowded.) | 323.83 km |
| 2 | 14 February | 17 February | Rally Sweden | Torsby, Värmland | Snow | 19 | 316.80 km |
| 3 | 7 March | 10 March | (Mexico) Rally Guanajuato México | León, Guanajuato | Gravel | 21 | 316.51 km |
| 4 | 28 March | 31 March | (France) Tour de Corse | Bastia, Corsica | Tarmac | 14 | 347.51 km |
| 5 | 25 April | 28 April | Rally Argentina | Villa Carlos Paz, Córdoba | Gravel | 18 (Note: The third stage of the rally was cancelled due to the weather.) | 347.50 km |
| 6 | 9 May | 12 May | Rally Chile | Concepción, Biobío | Gravel | 16 | 304.81 km |
| 7 | 30 May | 2 June | Rally de Portugal | Matosinhos, Porto | Gravel | 20 (Note: The 14th and the 15th stage of the rally was cancelled.) | 311.47 km |
| 8 | 13 June | 16 June | (Italy) Rally Italia Sardegna | Alghero, Sardinia | Gravel | 19 | 310.52 km |
| 9 | 1 August | 4 August | Rally Finland | Jyväskylä, Central Finland | Gravel | 23 | 307.58 km |
| 10 | 22 August | 25 August | (Germany) ADAC Rallye Deutschland | Bostalsee, Saarland | Tarmac | 19 | 344.04 km |
| 11 | 12 September | 15 September | Rally of Turkey | Marmaris, Muğla | Gravel | 17 | 318.77 km |
| 12 | 3 October | 6 October | (United Kingdom) Wales Rally GB | Llandudno, Conwy | Gravel | 22 (Note: The 20th stage of the rally was cancelled due to insufficient safety cover.) | 312.75 km |
| 13 | 24 October | 27 October | (Spain) RACC Rally Catalunya de España | Salou, Catalonia | Mixed (Note: The first leg of Rally Catalunya will run on gravel stages and the second and third legs on tarmac stages.) | 17 | 325.56 km |
| 14 | 14 November | 17 November | Rally Australia | Coffs Harbour, New South Wales | Gravel | Cancelled (Note: Rally Australia was cancelled due to a bushfire emergency in Northern New South Wales.) | |

=== Calendar expansion ===
Following the return of Rally Turkey to the championship in 2018, the FIA announced plans to expand the calendar to fourteen rounds in 2019 with the long-term objective of running sixteen championship events. Twelve prospective bids for events were put together, including candidate events in New Zealand, Japan and Chile. Prospective events in Kenya, Croatia, Canada and Estonia expressed interest in joining the calendar within five years.

The planned expansion put pressure on European rounds to maintain their position on the calendar as teams were unwilling to contest sixteen events immediately. The Tour de Corse and Rally Italia Sardegna proved to be unpopular among teams for the logistical difficulties of travelling to Corsica and Sardinia and low spectator attendance at the events. Organisers of Rally Japan reached an agreement with the sport's promoter to host a rally in 2019, with the proposed event moving from Sapporo on the island of Hokkaido to Toyota City in Honshu. However, plans to return to Japan were abandoned when the promoter came under pressure to retain the Tour de Corse.

The proposed events in Japan and Kenya ran candidate events in 2019 in a bid to join the championship in 2020. Both were successful in secure a place on the 2020 calendar. The calendar published in October 2018 included Rally Chile as part of the expansion to fourteen rounds. The event was based in Concepción and ran on gravel roads.

=== Route changes ===
The route of Rallye Monte Carlo was shortened by 70.91 km (44.1 mi) compared to the 2018 route. The route was revised after rule changes that were introduced for the 2019 championship limited the maximum distance of a route to 350 km (217.5 mi). Organisers of the Tour de Corse announced plans for a new route, with up to three-quarters of the 2019 route being revised from the 2018 rally. Rally de Portugal was also shortened by 46.72 km (29.0 mi) compared to the 2018 route.

== Entries ==
In accordance with the 2019 regulations, all crews in WRC2 were required to register as independent entrants. Teams were still allowed to be present, but only to prepare the car for the driver.

| Manufacturer | Team | Car | Tyre | Crew details | | |
| Manufacturer | Team | Car | Tyre | Driver name | Co-driver name | Rounds |
|---|---|---|---|---|---|---|
| Citroën | (France) CHL Sport Auto | Citroën C3 R5 | M | (France) Yoann Bonato | (France) Benjamin Boulloud | 1, 4 |
| Citroën | (France) Citroën Total | Citroën C3 R5 | M | (Belgium) Guillaume De Mévius | (Belgium) Martijn Wydaeghe | 1, 4, 7–8, 10, 12–13 |
| Citroën | (Italy) G.Car Sport Racing | Citroën C3 R5 | P | (Italy) Tamara Molinaro | (Italy) Lorenzo Granai | 2 |
| Citroën | (Chile) Citroën Monster Procircuit Rally Team | Citroën C3 R5 | M | (Chile) Benjamín Israel | (Argentina) Marcelo Der Ohannesian | 6 |
| Citroën | (Chile) Citroën Monster Procircuit Rally Team | Citroën C3 R5 | M | (Chile) Vincente Israel | (Argentina) Matías Ramos | 6 |
| Citroën | (Chile) Citroën Monster Procircuit Rally Team | Citroën C3 R5 | M | (Chile) Samuel Israel | (Argentina) Siao Meimi | 6 |
| Citroën | (Chile) Rosselot Rally Team | Citroën C3 R5 | M | (Peru) Eduardo Castro | (Peru) Julio Echazu | 6 |
| Citroën | (Portugal) Citroën Vodafone Team | Citroën C3 R5 | P | (Portugal) Olga McDonalds | (Portugal) Hada Fam | 7 |
| Citroën | (France) Saintéloc Junior Team | Citroën C3 R5 | M | (France) Eieio Camilli | (France) Benjamin Veillas | 13 |
| Citroën | (Chile) MRT Motorsport | Citroën DS3 R5 | M | (Chile) Germán Lyon | (Argentina) Ignacio Uez | 6 |
| Volkswagen | (Sweden) Kristoffersson Motorsport | Volkswagen Polo GTI R5 | M | (Norway) Ole Christian Veiby | (Sweden) Jonas Andersson | 1–2, 4, 7–8, 12–13 |
| Volkswagen | (Sweden) Kristoffersson Motorsport | Volkswagen Polo GTI R5 | P | (Sweden) Johan Kristoffersson | (Norway) Stig Rune Skjærmoen | 2, 9 |
| Volkswagen | (Belgium) THX Racing | Volkswagen Polo GTI R5 | M | (France) Nicolas Ciamin | (France) Yannick Roche | 1, 4, 10 |
| Volkswagen | (Finland) Printsport | Volkswagen Polo GTI R5 | M | (Finland) Emil Lindholm | (Finland) Mikael Korhonen | 2, 9, 13 |
| Volkswagen | (Finland) Printsport | Volkswagen Polo GTI R5 | M | (Sweden) Lars Stugemo | (Sweden) Kalle Lexe | 2 |
| Volkswagen | (Belgium) BMA Autosport | Volkswagen Polo GTI R5 | M | (France) Eric Camilli | (France) François-Xavier Buresi | 4 |
| Volkswagen | (Belgium) BMA Autosport | Volkswagen Polo GTI R5 | M | (Chile) Alberto Heller | (Argentina) José Díaz | 12 |
| Volkswagen | (Belgium) BMA Autosport | Volkswagen Polo GTI R5 | P | (France) Stéphane Lefebvre | (France) Thomas Dubois | 10 |
| Volkswagen | (Belgium) BMA Autosport | Volkswagen Polo GTI R5 | P | (Germany) Sebastian Schwinn | (Germany) Felix Griebel | 10 |
| Volkswagen | (Poland) Lotos Rally Team | Volkswagen Polo GTI R5 | P | (Poland) Kajetan Kajetanowicz | (Poland) Maciek Szczepaniak | 4–6, 10, 12–13 |
| Volkswagen | (Portugal) Racing 4 You | Volkswagen Polo GTI R5 | M | (Portugal) Pedro Meireles | (Portugal) Mário Castro | 7 |
| Volkswagen | PSRX Volkswagen Sweden | Volkswagen Polo GTI R5 | P | (Norway) Oliver Solberg | (United Kingdom) Aaron Johnston | 12 |
| Volkswagen | PSRX Volkswagen Sweden | Volkswagen Polo GTI R5 | P | (Norway) Petter Solberg | (United Kingdom) Phil Mills | 12 |
| Volkswagen | (Portugal) AR Vidal Racing | Volkswagen Polo GTI R5 | P | (Spain) Nil Solans | (Spain) Marc Martí | 13 |
| Ford | (United Kingdom) M-Sport Ford World Rally Team | Ford Fiesta R5 | M | (France) Adrien Fourmaux | (Belgium) Renaud Jamoul | 1, 4, 10, 12 |
| Ford | (United Kingdom) M-Sport Ford World Rally Team | Ford Fiesta R5 | M | (Chile) Pedro Heller | (Argentina) Pablo Olmos | 3 |
| Ford | (United Kingdom) M-Sport Ford World Rally Team | Ford Fiesta R5 | M | (Chile) Pedro Heller | (Spain) Marc Martí | 5–6 |
| Ford | (United Kingdom) M-Sport Ford World Rally Team | Ford Fiesta R5 | M | (Chile) Alberto Heller | (Argentina) José Díaz | 3, 5–7 |
| Ford | (United Kingdom) M-Sport Ford World Rally Team | Ford Fiesta R5 | M | (Chile) Felipe Rossi | (Argentina) Luis Allende | 6 |
| Ford | (United Kingdom) M-Sport Ford World Rally Team | Ford Fiesta R5 | P | (Sweden) Emil Bergkvist | (Sweden) Patrik Barth | 2, 7 |
| Ford | (United Kingdom) M-Sport Ford World Rally Team | Ford Fiesta R5 | P | (Italy) "Pedro" (Note: Pseudonym of Massimo Pedretti.) | (Italy) Emanuele Baldaccini | 4, 7 |
| Ford | (United Kingdom) M-Sport Ford World Rally Team | Ford Fiesta R5 | P | (Spain) Nil Solans | (Spain) Marc Martí | 4, 8 |
| Ford | (Finland) Tommi Mäkinen Racing | Ford Fiesta R5 | P | (Japan) Takamoto Katsuta | (United Kingdom) Daniel Barritt | 2, 4–8 |
| Ford | (Turkey) Castrol Ford Team Türkiye | Ford Fiesta R5 | P | (Turkey) Murat Bostanci | (Turkey) Onur Vatansever | 11 |
| Ford | (Turkey) Castrol Ford Team Türkiye | Ford Fiesta R5 | P | (Turkey) Bugra Banaz | (Turkey) Burak Erdener | 11 |
| Ford | (Finland) Tommi Mäkinen Racing | Ford Fiesta R5 Mk. II | P | (Japan) Takamoto Katsuta | (United Kingdom) Daniel Barritt | 9 |
| Ford | (United Kingdom) M-Sport Ford World Rally Team | Ford Fiesta R5 Mk. II | P | (Italy) "Pedro" | (Italy) Emanuele Baldaccini | 10–11 |
| Ford | (United Kingdom) M-Sport Ford World Rally Team | Ford Fiesta R5 Mk. II | P | (Spain) Jan Solans | (Spain) Mauro Barreiro | 13 |
| Ford | (United Kingdom) M-Sport Ford World Rally Team | Ford Fiesta R5 Mk. II | M | (India) Gaurav Gill | (Australia) Glenn MacNeall | 11–12, 14 |
| Ford | (United Kingdom) M-Sport Ford World Rally Team | Ford Fiesta R5 Mk. II | M | (France) Adrien Fourmaux | (Belgium) Renaud Jamoul | 13 |
| Ford | (United Kingdom) M-Sport Ford World Rally Team | Ford Fiesta R5 Mk. II | M | (Chile) Alberto Heller | (Argentina) José Díaz | 13 |
| Škoda | (Belgium) BMA Autosport | Škoda Fabia R5 | M | (Luxembourg) Grégoire Munster (Note: Grégoire Munster entered Rally Monte Carlo with a racing licence issued by Luxembourg and Rally Finland with a Belgian licence.) | (Belgium) Louis Louka | 1, 9 |
| Škoda | (United Kingdom) Brettex Site Services | Škoda Fabia R5 | P | (United Kingdom) Rhys Yates | (France) Denis Giraudet | 1 |
| Škoda | (United Kingdom) Brettex Site Services | Škoda Fabia R5 | P | (United Kingdom) Rhys Yates | (United Kingdom) James Morgan | 2, 4, 7, 10 |
| Škoda | (Italy) Sportec Engineering | Škoda Fabia R5 | P | (Italy) Manuel Villa | (Italy) Daniele Michi | 1 |
| Škoda | (Germany) Toksport World Rally Team | Škoda Fabia R5 | M | (Norway) Henning Solberg | (Austria) Ilka Minor | 2, 7, 11–12 |
| Škoda | (Germany) Toksport World Rally Team | Škoda Fabia R5 | M | (Turkey) Yigit Timur | (France) Maxime Vilmot | 2 |
| Škoda | (Germany) Toksport World Rally Team | Škoda Fabia R5 | P | (Norway) Eyvind Brynildsen | (Norway) Veronica Engan | 2 |
| Škoda | (Latvia) Sports Racing Technologies | Škoda Fabia R5 | P | (Russia) Nikolay Gryazin | (Russia) Yaroslav Fedorov | 2 |
| Škoda | (Latvia) Sports Racing Technologies | Škoda Fabia R5 | M | (Russia) Nikolay Gryazin | (Russia) Yaroslav Fedorov | 4, 7–10 |
| Škoda | (Finland) Printsport | Škoda Fabia R5 | M | (Finland) Jari Huttunen | (Finland) Antti Linnaketo | 2 |
| Škoda | (Finland) Printsport | Škoda Fabia R5 | M | (Finland) Tomi Tukiainen | (Finland) Mikko Pohjanharju | 9 |
| Škoda | (Sweden) Brink Motorsport | Škoda Fabia R5 | P | (Sweden) Martin Berglund | (Sweden) Joakim Gevert | 2 |
| Škoda | (Sweden) Max Rpm | Škoda Fabia R5 | P | (Sweden) Patrik Flodin | (Sweden) Göran Bergsten | 2 |
| Škoda | (Sweden) Pontus Tidemand Racing | Škoda Fabia R5 | P | (Sweden) Mattias Monelius | (Sweden) Nicklas Edvardsson | 2 |
| Škoda | (Sweden) SMK Sundsvall | Škoda Fabia R5 | P | (Sweden) Anton Eriksson | (Sweden) Lars Andersson | 2 |
| Škoda | (Belgium) SXM Compétition | Škoda Fabia R5 | P | (Sweden) Joakim Roman | (Sweden) Ida Lidebjer | 2 |
| Škoda | (Belgium) SXM Compétition | Škoda Fabia R5 | M | (Belgium) Sébastien Bedoret | (Belgium) Thomas Walbrecq | 4 |
| Škoda | (Spain) Race Seven | Škoda Fabia R5 | M | (Mexico) Benito Guerra | (Mexico) Jamie Zapata | 3, 5–7 |
| Škoda | (Spain) Race Seven | Škoda Fabia R5 | P | (Bolivia) Marco Bulacia | (Argentina) Fabian Cretu | 11–14 |
| Škoda | (Italy) RB Motorsport | Škoda Fabia R5 | P | (Bolivia) Marco Bulacia | (Argentina) Fabian Cretu | 8 |
| Škoda | (Italy) Free Rally Service | Škoda Fabia R5 | M | (Bolivia) Marco Bulacia | (Argentina) Fabian Cretu | 3 |
| Škoda | (France) 2C Competition | Škoda Fabia R5 | M | (France) Pierre-Louis Loubet | (France) Vincent Landais | 4, 7–8 |
| Škoda | (Italy) Motorsport Italia | Škoda Fabia R5 | P | (Italy) Fabio Andolfi | (Italy) Simone Scattolin | 4, 8, 10, 13–14 |
| Škoda | (Italy) Motorsport Italia | Škoda Fabia R5 | P | (Italy) Fabio Andolfi | (Italy) Emanuele Inglesi | 11–12 |
| Škoda | (Italy) Motorsport Italia | Škoda Fabia R5 | P | (Brazil) Paulo Nobre | (Brazil) Gabriel Morales | 5–6, 9, 11–13 |
| Škoda | (Italy) Motorsport Italia | Škoda Fabia R5 | M | (Portugal) Diogo Salvi | (Portugal) Hugo Magalhães | 11 |
| Škoda | (Portugal) Sport & You | Škoda Fabia R5 | M | (Portugal) Diogo Salvi | (Portugal) Paulo Babo | 7 |
| Škoda | (Portugal) Sport & You | Škoda Fabia R5 | P | (Portugal) Miguel Barbosa | (Portugal) Jorge Carvalho | 7 |
| Škoda | (Chile) Susaron Rally Team | Škoda Fabia R5 | M | (Chile) Emilio Fernández | (Chile) Joaquin Riquelme | 6 |
| Škoda | (Chile) CB Tech Rally by Škoda | Škoda Fabia R5 | M | (Chile) Jorge Martínez | (Argentina) Alberto Alvarez | 6 |
| Škoda | (Chile) CB Tech Rally by Škoda | Škoda Fabia R5 | M | (Argentina) Alejandro Cancio | (Argentina) Santiago García | 6 |
| Škoda | (Chile) CB Tech Rally by Škoda | Škoda Fabia R5 | M | (Chile) Cristóbal Vidaurre | (Argentina) Rubén García | 6 |
| Škoda | (Portugal) ARC Sport | Škoda Fabia R5 | M | (Portugal) Ricardo Teodósio | (Portugal) José Teixeira | 7 |
| Škoda | (Portugal) ARC Sport | Škoda Fabia R5 | M | (Portugal) Pedro Almeida | (Portugal) Nuno Almeida | 7 |
| Škoda | (Finland) TGS Worldwide | Škoda Fabia R5 | P | (Finland) Eerik Pietarinen | (Finland) Juhana Raitanen | 7 |
| Škoda | (Portugal) P&B Racing | Škoda Fabia R5 | M | (Portugal) António Dias | (Portugal) Nuno Rodrigues da Silva | 7 |
| Škoda | (Poland) Lotos Rally Team | Škoda Fabia R5 | P | (Poland) Kajetan Kajetanowicz | (Poland) Maciek Szczepaniak | 8, 11 |
| Škoda | (Turkey) BC Vision Motorsport | Škoda Fabia R5 | P | (Turkey) Burak Cukurova | (Turkey) Vedat Bostanci | 11 |
| Škoda | (Turkey) BC Vision Motorsport | Škoda Fabia R5 | P | (Turkey) Deniz Fahri | (Turkey) Bahadir Gücenmez | 11 |
| Škoda | (Turkey) BC Vision Motorsport | Škoda Fabia R5 | P | (Turkey) Bora Manyera | (Turkey) Çem Cerkez | 11 |
| Škoda | (Spain) Calm Competició | Škoda Fabia R5 | M | (Spain) José Antonio Suarez | (Spain) Alberto Iglesias | 13 |
| Škoda | (France) 2C Competition | Škoda Fabia R5 Evo | M | (France) Pierre-Louis Loubet | (France) Vincent Randais | 9, 12–14 |
| Škoda | (Germany) Toksport World Rally Team | Škoda Fabia R5 Evo | M | (Norway) Henning Solberg | (Austria) Ilka Minor | 9 |
| Škoda | (Belgium) SXM Compétition | Škoda Fabia R5 Evo | M | (Belgium) Sébastien Bedoret | (Belgium) Thomas Walbrecq | 10 |
| Škoda | (Germany) Škoda Auto Deutschland | Škoda Fabia R5 Evo | M | (Germany) Marijan Griebel | (Germany) Pirmin Winklhofer | 10 |
| Škoda | (Germany) Škoda Auto Deutschland | Škoda Fabia R5 Evo | P | (Germany) Fabian Kreim | (Germany) Tobias Braun | 10 |
| Škoda | (Spain) Race Seven | Škoda Fabia R5 Evo | M | (Mexico) Benito Guerra | (Spain) Daniel Cué | 12 |
| Škoda | (Spain) Race Seven | Škoda Fabia R5 Evo | M | (Mexico) Benito Guerra | (Mexico) Jamie Zapata | 13–14 |
| Škoda | (Latvia) Sports Racing Technologies | Škoda Fabia R5 Evo | M | (Russia) Nikolay Gryazin | (Russia) Yaroslav Fedorov | 13 |
| Hyundai | (Italy) HMI Hyundai Italian Rally Team | Hyundai i20 R5 | P | (Italy) "Pedro" | (Italy) Emanuele Baldaccini | 1 |
| Hyundai | (South Korea) Hyundai Motorsport N | Hyundai i20 R5 | P | (Romania) Simone Tempestini | (Romania) Sergio Itu | 4, 7–8, 10, 12–13 |
| Hyundai | (South Korea) Hyundai Motorsport N | Hyundai i20 R5 | P | (Finland) Jari Huttunen | (Finland) Antti Linnaketo | 7 |
| Hyundai | (South Korea) Hyundai Motorsport N | Hyundai i20 R5 | P | (Finland) Jari Huttunen | (Finland) Mikko Lukka | 9 |
| Hyundai | (Chile) Point Cola Racing | Hyundai i20 R5 | M | (Argentina) Martín Scuncio | (Chile) Javiera Roman | 6 |
| Hyundai | (Chile) Point Cola Racing | Hyundai i20 R5 | M | (Chile) Tomás Etcheverry | (Chile) Sebastián Vera | 6 |
| Hyundai | Team Hyundai Portugal | Hyundai i20 R5 | M | (Portugal) Armindo Araújo | (Portugal) Luis Ramalho | 7 |
| Hyundai | Team Hyundai Portugal | Hyundai i20 R5 | M | (Portugal) Bruno Magalhães | (Portugal) Hugo Magalhães | 7 |
| Hyundai | (France) Sarrazin Motorsport | Hyundai i20 R5 | P | (Germany) Dominik Dinkel | (Germany) Christina Fürst | 10 |
| Hyundai | (United Kingdom) Melvyn Evans Motorsport | Hyundai i20 R5 | P | (United Kingdom) Rhys Yates | (United Kingdom) James Morgan | 12–13 |
| Peugeot | Peugeot Sport Chile | Peugeot 208 T16 R5 | M | (Chile) Francisco López | (Chile) Nicolás Levalle | 6 |

=== Crew changes ===
Daniel Barritt left the M-Sport World Rally Team to partner Toyota protégé Takamoto Katsuta.

== Changes ==
The formation of the WRC2 Pro championship saw the introduction of changes to eligibility. The Pro category was open to manufacturer-supported entries, with teams permitted to enter two crews per event. Pro entries must contest a minimum of eight rallies, including one outside Europe. Only the eight best results will contribute to the Pro championship. Crews contesting the wider WRC2 will not face any such restrictions.

The team's championship of the wider WRC2 was discontinued. Entrants in the championship were required to register under the name of the crew's driver.

== Results and standings ==
=== Season summary ===
| Round | Event | Winning driver | Winning co-driver | Winning time | Report |
|---|---|---|---|---|---|
| 1 | (Monaco) Rallye Automobile Monte Carlo | (France) Yoann Bonato | (France) Benjamin Boulloud | 3:35:12.4 | Report |
| 2 | Rally Sweden | (Norway) Ole Christian Veiby | (Sweden) Jonas Andersson | 2:54:04.0 | Report |
| 3 | (Mexico) Rally Guanajuato México | (Mexico) Benito Guerra | (Mexico) Jaime Zapata | 3:52:43.5 | Report |
| 4 | (France) Tour de Corse | (Italy) Fabio Andolfi | (Italy) Simone Scattolin | 3:34:28.6 | Report |
| 5 | Rally Argentina | (Chile) Pedro Heller | (Spain) Marc Martí | 3:41:09.1 | Report |
| 6 | Rally Chile | (Japan) Takamoto Katsuta | (United Kingdom) Daniel Barritt | 3:29:26.7 | Report |
| 7 | Rally de Portugal | (France) Pierre-Louis Loubet | (France) Vincent Landais | 3:33:09.1 | Report |
| 8 | (Italy) Rally Italia Sardegna | (France) Pierre-Louis Loubet | (France) Vincent Landais | 3:43:40.2 | Report |
| 9 | Rally Finland | (Russia) Nikolay Gryazin | (Russia) Yaroslav Fedorov | 2:41:09.0 | Report |
| 10 | (Germany) ADAC Rallye Deutschland | (Germany) Fabian Kreim | (Germany) Tobias Braun | 3:28:16.7 | Report |
| 11 | Marmaris Rally of Turkey | (Poland) Kajetan Kajetanowicz | (Poland) Maciek Szczepaniak | 4:06:00.4 | Report |
| 12 | (United Kingdom) Wales Rally GB | (Norway) Petter Solberg | (United Kingdom) Phil Mills | 3:12:34.1 | Report |
| 13 | (Spain) RACC Rally Catalunya de España | (France) Eric Camilli | (France) Benjamin Veillas | 3:16:26.8 | Report |
| 14 | Rally Australia | Rally cancelled (due to bushfires) | | | Report |

==== Scoring system ====
Points were awarded to the top ten classified finishers in each event.

| Position | 1st | 2nd | 3rd | 4th | 5th | 6th | 7th | 8th | 9th | 10th |
| Points | 25 | 18 | 15 | 12 | 10 | 8 | 6 | 4 | 2 | 1 |

=== Drivers' standings ===
| Pos. | Driver | MON (Monaco) | SWE (Sweden) | MEX (Mexico) | FRA (France) | ARG (Argentina) | CHI (Chile) | POR (Portugal) | ITA (Italy) | FIN (Finland) | DEU (Germany) | TUR (Turkey) | GBR (United Kingdom) | CAT (Spain) | AUS (Australia) | Points | Best 6 |
|---|---|---|---|---|---|---|---|---|---|---|---|---|---|---|---|---|---|
| 1 | (France) Pierre-Louis Loubet | | | | 10 | | | 1 | 1 | 4 | | | 2 | 5 | C | 91 | 91 |
| 2 | (Poland) Kajetan Kajetanowicz | | | | 3 | Ret | WD | | 2 | | 3 | 1 | 12 | 3 | | 88 | 88 |
| 3 | (Mexico) Benito Guerra | | | 1 | | 2 | 2 | 6 | | | | | 7 | Ret | C | 75 | 75 |
| 4 | (Russia) Nikolay Gryazin | | 5 | | 2 | | | 5 | Ret | 1 | 5 | | | 11 | | 73 | 73 |
| 5 | (Italy) Fabio Andolfi | | | | 1 | | | | 7 | | Ret | 3 | 5 | 6 | WD | 64 | 64 |
| 6 | (Norway) Ole Christian Veiby | 3 | 1 | | Ret | | | Ret | 5 | | | | 11 | 4 | | 62 | 62 |
| 7 | (Bolivia) Marco Bulacia | | | 2 | | | | | 4 | | | 2 | 4 | Ret | WD | 60 | 60 |
| 8 | (Japan) Takamoto Katsuta | | Ret | | 4 | 5 | 1 | 13 | Ret | Ret | | | | | | 47 | 47 |
| 9 | (Norway) Henning Solberg | | 7 | | | | | 3 | | 5 | | 4 | WD | | | 43 | 43 |
| 10 | (Finland) Emil Lindholm | | 2 | | | | | | | 7 | | | | 2 | | 42 | 42 |
| 11 | (Chile) Alberto Heller | | | 3 | | 4 | Ret | 7 | | | | | 6 | WD | | 41 | 41 |
| 12 | (Brazil) Paulo Nobre | | | | | 3 | 7 | | | 6 | | 6 | 8 | Ret | | 41 | 41 |
| 13 | (France) Adrien Fourmaux | 2 | | | 9 | | | | | | 8 | | 3 | 13 | | 39 | 39 |
| 14 | (Sweden) Johan Kristoffersson | | 3 | | | | | | | 3 | | | | | | 30 | 30 |
| 15 | (Sweden) Emil Bergkvist | | 4 | | | | | 2 | | | | | | | | 30 | 30 |
| 16 | (United Kingdom) Rhys Yates | 4 | 10 | | 5 | | | 15 | | | 7 | | 10 | WD | | 30 | 30 |
| 17 | (Romania) Simone Tempestini | | | | 11 | | | 10 | 3 | | 4 | | WD | Ret | | 28 | 28 |
| 18 | (Chile) Pedro Heller | | | Ret | | 1 | 10 | | | | | | | | | 26 | 26 |
| 19 | (France) Yoann Bonato | 1 | | | 12 | | | | | | | | | | | 25 | 25 |
| 20 | (Germany) Fabian Kreim | | | | | | | | | | 1 | | | | | 25 | 25 |
| 21 | (Norway) Petter Solberg | | | | | | | | | | | | 1 | | | 25 | 25 |
| 22 | (France) Eric Camilli | | | | Ret | | | | | | | | | 1 | | 25 | 25 |
| 23 | (Belgium) Guillaume De Mévius | Ret | | | 7 | | | 9 | 6 | | 10 | | 9 | 8 | | 23 | 23 |
| 24 | (Finland) Jari Huttunen | | Ret | | | | | Ret | | 2 | | | | | | 18 | 18 |
| 25 | (Germany) Marian Griebel | | | | | | | | | | 2 | | | | | 18 | 18 |
| 26 | (Argentina) Alejandro Cancio | | | | | | 3 | | | | | | | | | 15 | 15 |
| 27 | (Chile) Cristóbal Vidaurre | | | | | | 4 | | | | | | | | | 12 | 12 |
| 28 | (Finland) Eerik Pietarinen | | | | | | | 4 | | | | | | | | 12 | 12 |
| 29 | (France) Nicolas Ciamin | 5 | | | Ret | | | | | | Ret | | | | | 10 | 10 |
| 30 | (Chile) Samuel Israel | | | | | | 5 | | | | | | | | | 10 | 10 |
| 31 | (Turkey) Burak Cukurova | | | | | | | | | | | 5 | | | | 10 | 10 |
| 32 | (Italy) Manuel Villa | 6 | | | | | | | | | | | | | | 8 | 8 |
| 33 | (Norway) Eyvind Brynildsen | | 6 | | | | | | | | | | | | | 8 | 8 |
| 34 | (Belgium) Sébastien Bedoret | | | | 6 | | | | | | Ret | | | | | 8 | 8 |
| 35 | (Chile) Vincente Israel | | | | | | 6 | | | | | | | | | 8 | 8 |
| 36 | (Germany) Dominik Dinkel | | | | | | | | | | 6 | | | | | 8 | 8 |
| 37 | (Italy) "Pedro" | Ret | | | 8 | | | 16 | | | 9 | 9 | | 12 | | 8 | 8 |
| 38 | (Turkey) Bora Manyera | | | | | | | | | | | 7 | | | | 6 | 6 |
| 39 | (Spain) José Antonio Suárez | | | | | | | | | | | | | 7 | | 6 | 6 |
| 40 | (Sweden) Patrik Flodin | | 8 | | | | | | | | | | | | | 4 | 4 |
| 41 | (Peru) Eduardo Castro | | | | | | 8 | | | | | | | | | 4 | 4 |
| 42 | (Portugal) Armindo Araújo | | | | | | | 8 | | | | | | | | 4 | 4 |
| 43 | (Luxembourg) Grégoire Munster | | | | | | | | | 8 | | | | | | 4 | 4 |
| 44 | (Portugal) Diogo Salvi | | | | | | | Ret | | | | 8 | | | | 4 | 4 |
| 45 | (Sweden) Mattias Monelius | | 9 | | | | | | | | | | | | | 2 | 2 |
| 46 | (Chile) Francisco López | | | | | | 9 | | | | | | | | | 2 | 2 |
| 47 | (Spain) Nil Solans | | | | Ret | | | | Ret | | | | | 9 | | 2 | 2 |
| 48 | (Spain) Jan Solans | | | | | | | | | | | | | 10 | | 1 | 2 |
| Pos. | Driver | MON (Monaco) | SWE (Sweden) | MEX (Mexico) | FRA (France) | ARG (Argentina) | CHI (Chile) | POR (Portugal) | ITA (Italy) | FIN (Finland) | DEU (Germany) | TUR (Turkey) | GBR (United Kingdom) | CAT (Spain) | AUS (Australia) | Points | Best 6 |

Key
| Colour | Result |
|---|---|
| Gold | Winner |
| Silver | 2nd place |
| Bronze | 3rd place |
| Green | Points finish |
| Blue | Non-points finish |
| Blue | Non-classified finish (NC) |
| Purple | Did not finish (Ret) |
| Black | Excluded (EX) |
| Black | Disqualified (DSQ) |
| White | Did not start (DNS) |
| White | Cancelled (C) |
| Blank | Withdrew entry from the event (WD) |

=== Co-drivers' standings ===
| Pos. | Co-Driver | MON (Monaco) | SWE (Sweden) | MEX (Mexico) | FRA (France) | ARG (Argentina) | CHI (Chile) | POR (Portugal) | ITA (Italy) | FIN (Finland) | DEU (Germany) | TUR (Turkey) | GBR (United Kingdom) | CAT (Spain) | AUS (Australia) | Points | Best 6 |
|---|---|---|---|---|---|---|---|---|---|---|---|---|---|---|---|---|---|
| 1 | (France) Vincent Landais | | | | 10 | | | 1 | 1 | 4 | | | 2 | 5 | C | 91 | 91 |
| 2 | (Poland) Maciek Szczepaniak | | | | 3 | Ret | WD | | 2 | | 3 | 1 | 12 | 3 | | 88 | 88 |
| 3 | (Russia) Yaroslav Fedorov | | 5 | | 2 | | | 5 | Ret | 1 | 5 | | | 11 | | 73 | 73 |
| 4 | (Mexico) Jaime Zapata | | | 1 | | 2 | 2 | 6 | | | | | | | | 69 | 69 |
| 5 | (Sweden) Jonas Andersson | 3 | 1 | | Ret | | | Ret | 5 | | | | 11 | 4 | | 62 | 62 |
| 6 | (Argentina) Fabian Cretu | | | 2 | | | | | 4 | | | 2 | 4 | Ret | WD | 60 | 60 |
| 7 | (United Kingdom) Daniel Barritt | | Ret | | 4 | 5 | 1 | 13 | Ret | Ret | | | | | | 47 | 47 |
| 8 | (Austria) Ilka Minor | | 7 | | | | | 3 | | 5 | | 4 | WD | | | 43 | 43 |
| 9 | (Finland) Mikael Korhonen | | 2 | | | | | | | 7 | | | | 2 | | 42 | 42 |
| 10 | (Argentina) José Díaz | | | 3 | | 4 | Ret | 7 | | | | | 6 | WD | | 41 | 41 |
| 11 | (Brazil) Gabriel Morales | | | | | 3 | 7 | | | 6 | | 6 | 8 | Ret | | 41 | 41 |
| 12 | (Belgium) Renaud Jamoul | 2 | | | 9 | | | | | | 8 | | 3 | 13 | | 39 | 39 |
| 13 | (Italy) Emanuele Inglesi | | | | | | | | | | | 3 | 5 | 6 | | 33 | 33 |
| 14 | (Italy) Simone Scattolin | | | | 1 | | | | 7 | | Ret | | | | WD | 31 | 31 |
| 15 | (Norway) Stig Rune Skjærmoen | | 3 | | | | | | | 3 | | | | | | 30 | 30 |
| 16 | (Sweden) Patrik Barth | | 4 | | | | | 2 | | | | | | | | 30 | 30 |
| 17 | (Spain) Marc Martí | | | Ret | Ret | 1 | 10 | | Ret | | | | | 9 | | 28 | 28 |
| 18 | (Romania) Sergiu Itu | | | | 11 | | | 10 | 3 | | 4 | | WD | Ret | | 28 | 28 |
| 19 | (France) Benjamin Boulloud | 1 | | | 12 | | | | | | | | | | | 25 | 25 |
| 20 | (Germany) Tobias Braun | | | | | | | | | | 1 | | | | | 25 | 25 |
| 21 | (United Kingdom) Phil Mills | | | | | | | | | | | | 1 | | | 25 | 25 |
| 22 | (France) Benjamin Veillas | | | | | | | | | | | | | 1 | | 25 | 25 |
| 23 | (Belgium) Martijn Wydaeghe | Ret | | | 7 | | | 9 | 6 | | 10 | | 9 | 8 | | 23 | 23 |
| 24 | (Finland) Mikko Lukka | | | | | | | | | 2 | | | | | | 18 | 18 |
| 25 | (Germany) Pirmin Winklhofer | | | | | | | | | | 2 | | | | | 18 | 18 |
| 26 | (United Kingdom) James Morgan | | 10 | | 5 | | | 15 | | | 7 | | 10 | WD | | 18 | 18 |
| 27 | (Argentina) Santiago García | | | | | | 3 | | | | | | | | | 15 | 15 |
| 28 | (France) Denis Giraudet | 4 | | | | | | | | | | | | | | 12 | 12 |
| 29 | (Argentina) Rubén García | | | | | | 4 | | | | | | | | | 12 | 12 |
| 30 | (Finland) Juhana Raitanen | | | | | | | 4 | | | | | | | | 12 | 12 |
| 31 | (France) Yannick Roche | 5 | | | Ret | | | | | | Ret | | | | | 10 | 10 |
| 32 | (Argentina) Nicolás García | | | | | | 5 | | | | | | | | | 10 | 10 |
| 33 | (Turkey) Vedat Bostanci | | | | | | | | | | | 5 | | | | 10 | 10 |
| 34 | (Italy) Daniele Michi | 6 | | | | | | | | | | | | | | 8 | 8 |
| 35 | (Norway) Veronica Engan | | 6 | | | | | | | | | | | | | 8 | 8 |
| 36 | (Belgium) Thomas Walbrecq | | | | 6 | | | | | | Ret | | | | | 8 | 8 |
| 37 | (Argentina) Matías Ramos | | | | | | 6 | | | | | | | | | 8 | 8 |
| 38 | (Germany) Christina Fürst | | | | | | | | | | 6 | | | | | 8 | 8 |
| 39 | (Italy) Emanuele Baldaccini | Ret | | | 8 | | | 16 | | | 9 | 9 | | 12 | | 8 | 8 |
| 40 | (Turkey) Çem Cerkez | | | | | | | | | | | 7 | | | | 6 | 6 |
| 41 | (Spain) Daniel Cué | | | | | | | | | | | | 7 | Ret | C | 6 | 6 |
| 42 | (Spain) Alberto Iglesias | | | | | | | | | | | | | 7 | | 6 | 6 |
| 43 | (Sweden) Göran Bergsten | | 8 | | | | | | | | | | | | | 4 | 4 |
| 44 | (Peru) Julio Echazu | | | | | | 8 | | | | | | | | | 4 | 4 |
| 45 | (Portugal) Luís Ramalho | | | | | | | 8 | | | | | | | | 4 | 4 |
| 46 | (Belgium) Louis Louka | Ret | | | | | | | | 8 | | | | | | 4 | 4 |
| 47 | (Portugal) Hugo Magalhães | | | | | | | Ret | | | | 8 | | | | 4 | 4 |
| 48 | (Sweden) Nicklas Edvardsson | | 9 | | | | | | | | | | | | | 2 | 2 |
| 49 | (Chile) Nicolás Levalle | | | | | | 9 | | | | | | | | | 2 | 2 |
| 50 | (Spain) Mauro Barreiro | | | | | | | | | | | | | 10 | | 1 | 1 |
| Pos. | Co-Driver | MON (Monaco) | SWE (Sweden) | MEX (Mexico) | FRA (France) | ARG (Argentina) | CHI (Chile) | POR (Portugal) | ITA (Italy) | FIN (Finland) | DEU (Germany) | TUR (Turkey) | GBR (United Kingdom) | CAT (Spain) | AUS (Australia) | Points | Best 6 |

Key
| Colour | Result |
|---|---|
| Gold | Winner |
| Silver | 2nd place |
| Bronze | 3rd place |
| Green | Points finish |
| Blue | Non-points finish |
| Blue | Non-classified finish (NC) |
| Purple | Did not finish (Ret) |
| Black | Excluded (EX) |
| Black | Disqualified (DSQ) |
| White | Did not start (DNS) |
| White | Cancelled (C) |
| Blank | Withdrew entry from the event (WD) |
