= 2019 World Rally Championship =

2019 edition of the World Rally Championship

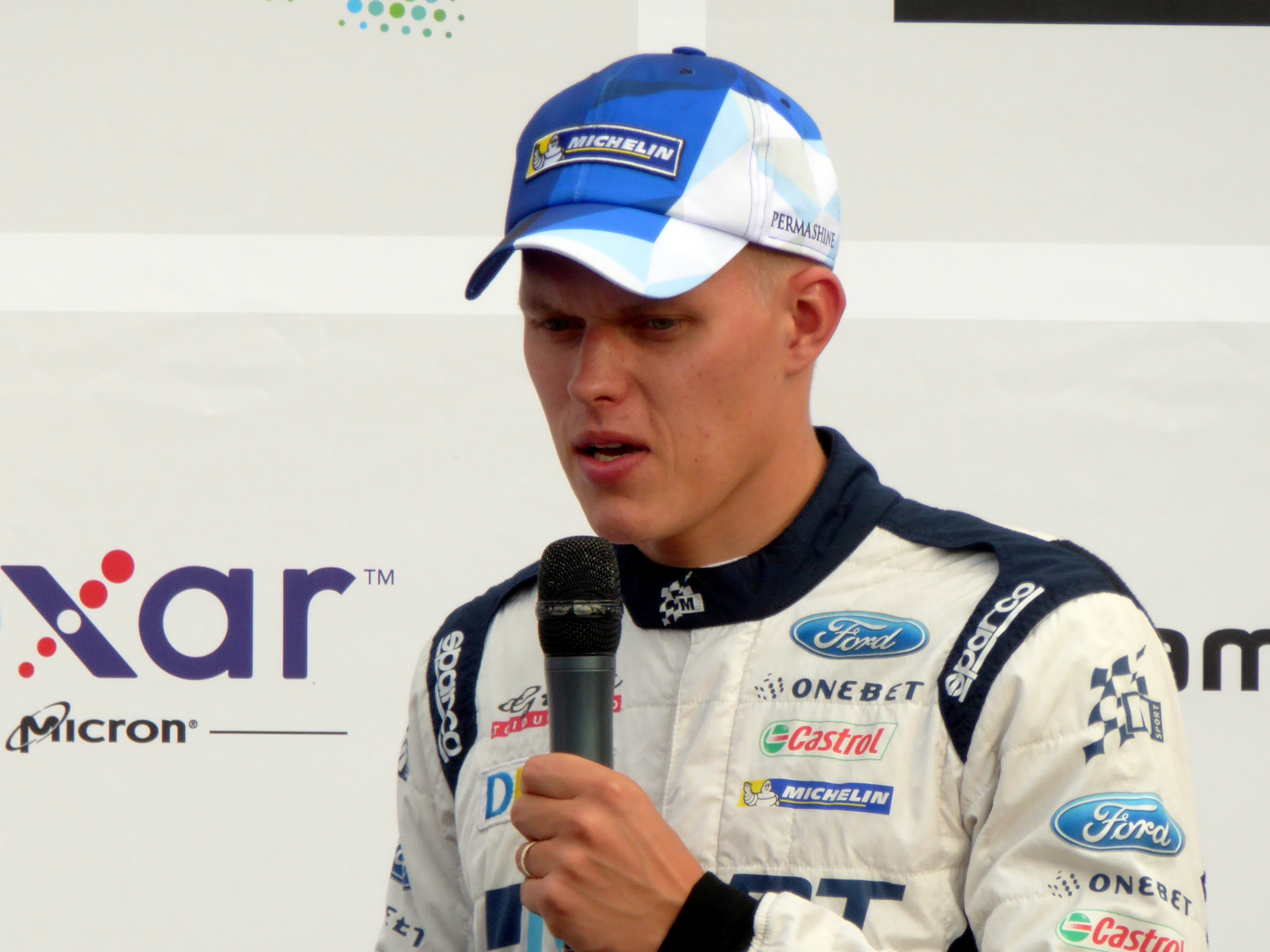
Ott Tänak won his first Drivers' Championship title.

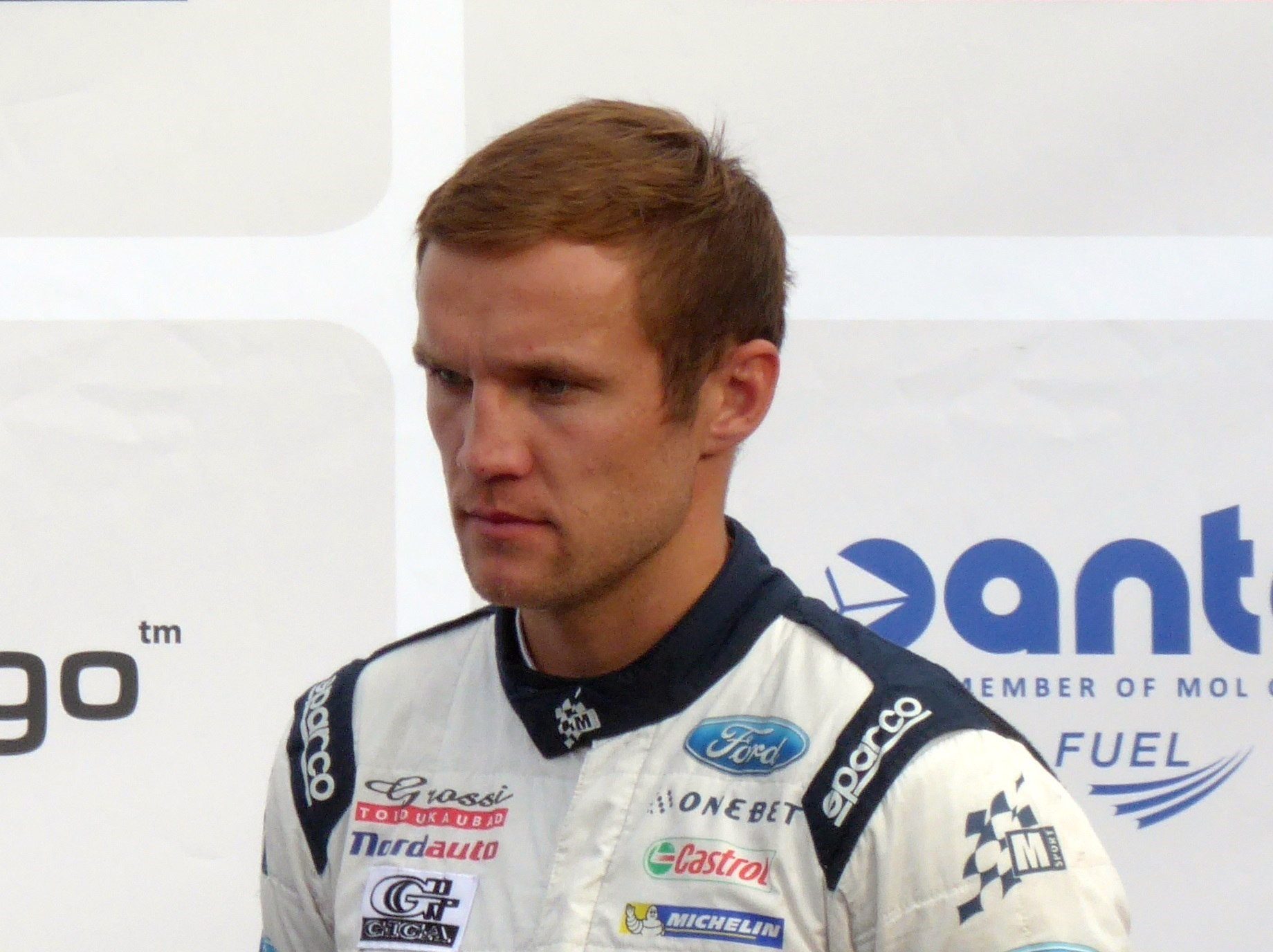
Martin Järveoja won his first Co-drivers' Championship title.

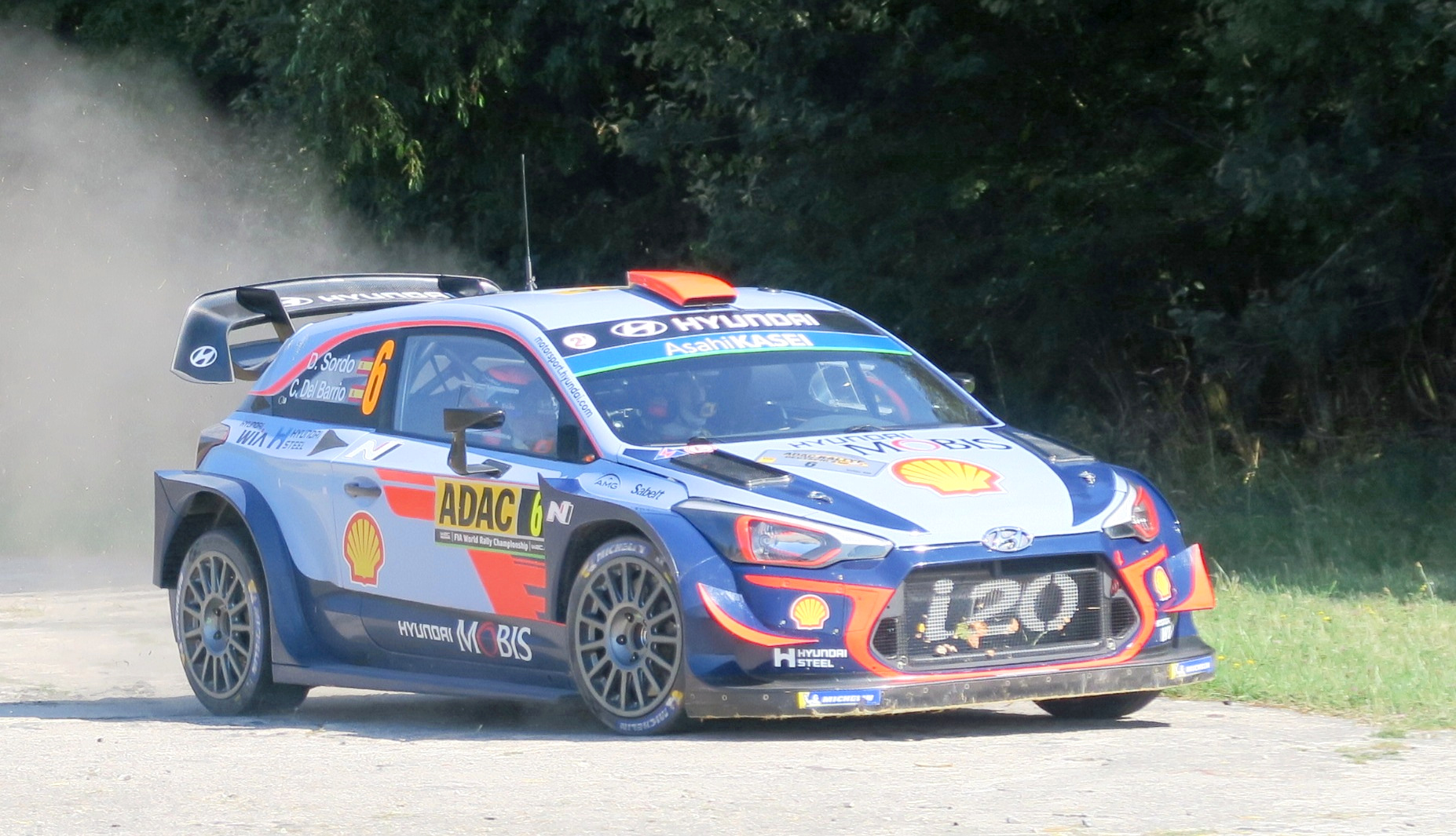
Hyundai (i20 Coupe WRC pictured) won their first Manufacturers' championship.

The 2019 FIA World Rally Championship was the forty-seventh season of the World Rally Championship, a rallying championship recognised by the Fédération Internationale de l'Automobile (FIA) as the highest class of international rallying. Teams and crews competed in fourteen events for the World Rally Championships for Drivers, Co-drivers and Manufacturers. Crews were free to compete in cars complying with World Rally Car and Group R regulations; however, only Manufacturers competing with World Rally Cars homologated under regulations introduced in 2017 were eligible to score points in the Manufacturers' championship. The series was once again supported by the WRC2 category at every round, which was split into 2 classifications: WRC2 Pro for manufacturer entries and WRC2 for private entries, and by Junior WRC at selected events. WRC3 was discontinued in 2018.

At the conclusion of the championship, Ott Tänak and Martin Järveoja won their maiden drivers' and co-drivers' championships, taking an unassailable lead of thirty-six points over Thierry Neuville and Nicolas Gilsoul. Defending champions Sébastien Ogier and Julien Ingrassia finished third. In the manufacturers' championship, Hyundai Shell Mobis WRT won their first title since they first participated in the championship. Defending manufacturers' champions Toyota Gazoo Racing WRT were second, with Citroën Total WRT in third.

== Calendar ==
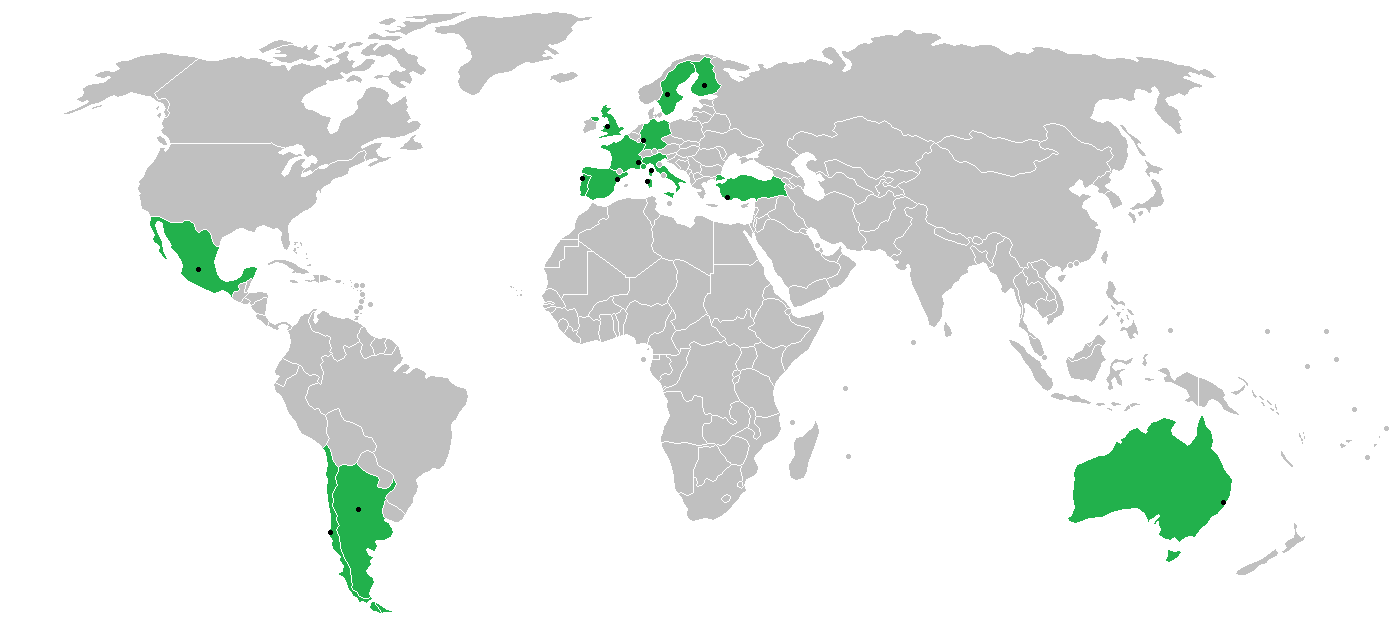
A map showing the locations of the rallies in the 2019 championship. Event headquarters are marked with a black dot.

The championship was contested over fourteen rounds in Europe, the Middle East, North and South America, and Australia.

Round	Dates		Rally	Rally headquarters	Rally details		
Round	Start	Finish	Rally	Rally headquarters	Surface	Stages	Distance
1	24 January	27 January	(Monaco) Rallye Automobile Monte Carlo	Gap, Provence-Alpes-Côte d'Azur (Note: The rally base of the Monte Carlo Rally was located in France.)	Mixed (Note: The Monte Carlo Rally was run on a tarmac and snow surface.)	16 (Note: The third stage of the rally was cancelled on safety grounds when spectator areas became overcrowded.)	323.83 km
2	14 February	17 February	Rally Sweden	Torsby, Värmland	Snow	19	316.80 km
3	7 March	10 March	(Mexico) Rally Guanajuato México	León, Guanajuato	Gravel	21	316.51 km
4	28 March	31 March	(France) Tour de Corse	Bastia, Corsica	Tarmac	14	347.51 km
5	25 April	28 April	Rally Argentina	Villa Carlos Paz, Córdoba	Gravel	18 (Note: The third stage of the rally was cancelled due to the weather.)	347.50 km
6	9 May	12 May	Rally Chile	Concepción, Biobío	Gravel	16	304.81 km
7	30 May	2 June	Rally de Portugal	Matosinhos, Porto	Gravel	20 (Note: The 14th and the 15th stage of the rally was cancelled.)	311.47 km
8	13 June	16 June	(Italy) Rally Italia Sardegna	Alghero, Sardinia	Gravel	19	310.52 km
9	1 August	4 August	Rally Finland	Jyväskylä, Central Finland	Gravel	23	307.58 km
10	22 August	25 August	(Germany) ADAC Rallye Deutschland	Bostalsee, Saarland	Tarmac	19	344.04 km
11	12 September	15 September	Rally of Turkey	Marmaris, Muğla	Gravel	17	318.77 km
12	3 October	6 October	(United Kingdom) Wales Rally GB	Llandudno, Conwy	Gravel	22 (Note: The 20th stage of the rally was cancelled due to insufficient safety cover.)	312.75 km
13	24 October	27 October	(Spain) RACC Rally Catalunya de España	Salou, Catalonia	Mixed (Note: The first leg of Rally Catalunya will run on gravel stages and the second and third legs on tarmac stages.)	17	325.56 km
14	14 November	17 November	Rally Australia	Coffs Harbour, New South Wales	Gravel	Cancelled (Note: Rally Australia was cancelled due to a bushfire emergency in Northern New South Wales.)	

=== Calendar expansion ===
Following the return of Rally Turkey to the championship in 2018, the FIA announced plans to expand the calendar to fourteen rounds in 2019 with the long-term objective of running sixteen championship events. Twelve prospective bids for events were put together, including candidate events in New Zealand, Japan and Chile. Prospective events in Kenya, Croatia, Canada and Estonia expressed interest in joining the calendar within five years.

The planned expansion put pressure on European rounds to maintain their position on the calendar as teams were unwilling to contest sixteen events immediately. The Tour de Corse and Rally Italia Sardegna proved to be unpopular among teams for the logistical difficulties of travelling to Corsica and Sardinia and low spectator attendance at the events. Organisers of Rally Japan reached an agreement with the sport's promoter to host a rally in 2019, with the proposed event moving from Sapporo on the island of Hokkaido to Toyota City in Honshu. However, plans to return to Japan were abandoned when the promoter came under pressure to retain the Tour de Corse.

The proposed events in Japan and Kenya ran candidate events in 2019 in a bid to join the championship in 2020. Both were successful in secure a place on the 2020 calendar. The calendar published in October 2018 included Rally Chile as part of the expansion to fourteen rounds. The event was based in Concepción and ran on gravel roads.

=== Route changes ===
The route of Rallye Monte Carlo was shortened by 70.91 km (44.1 mi) compared to the 2018 route. The route was revised after rule changes that were introduced for the 2019 championship limited the maximum distance of a route to 350 km (217.5 mi). Organisers of the Tour de Corse announced plans for a new route, with up to three-quarters of the 2019 route being revised from the 2018 rally. Rally de Portugal was also shortened by 46.72 km (29.0 mi) compared to the 2018 route.

== Entries ==
The following teams and crews competed in the 2019 FIA World Rally Championship. Citroën, Ford, Hyundai and Toyota were all represented by manufacturer teams and eligible to score points in the FIA World Rally Championship for Manufacturers. All World Rally Championship entries utilizing Michelin tyres.

World Rally Car entries eligible to score manufacturer points
Manufacturer	Entrant	Car	Crew details			
Manufacturer	Entrant	Car	No.	Driver name	Co-driver name	Rounds
Citroën	(France) Citroën Total WRT	Citroën C3 WRC	1	(France) Sébastien Ogier	(France) Julien Ingrassia	All
Citroën	(France) Citroën Total WRT	Citroën C3 WRC	4	(Finland) Esapekka Lappi	(Finland) Janne Ferm	All
Ford	(United Kingdom) M-Sport Ford WRT	Ford Fiesta WRC	3	(Finland) Teemu Suninen	(Finland) Marko Salminen	1–7
Ford	(United Kingdom) M-Sport Ford WRT	Ford Fiesta WRC	3	(Finland) Teemu Suninen	(Finland) Jarmo Lehtinen	8–14
Ford	(United Kingdom) M-Sport Ford WRT	Ford Fiesta WRC	7	(Sweden) Pontus Tidemand	(Norway) Ola Fløene	1–2, 11–12
Ford	(United Kingdom) M-Sport Ford WRT	Ford Fiesta WRC	20	(New Zealand) Hayden Paddon	(New Zealand) John Kennard	14
Ford	(United Kingdom) M-Sport Ford WRT	Ford Fiesta WRC	33	(United Kingdom) Elfyn Evans (Note: Elfyn Evans and Scott Martin were entered into Rally Finland, but were withdrawn before the event due to an injury sustained by Evans.)	(United Kingdom) Scott Martin	1–8, 12–14
Ford	(United Kingdom) M-Sport Ford WRT	Ford Fiesta WRC	33	(United Kingdom) Gus Greensmith	(United Kingdom) Elliott Edmondson	9
Ford	(United Kingdom) M-Sport Ford WRT	Ford Fiesta WRC	44	(United Kingdom) Gus Greensmith	(United Kingdom) Elliott Edmondson	7, 10
Hyundai	(South Korea) Hyundai Shell Mobis WRT	Hyundai i20 Coupe WRC	6	(Spain) Dani Sordo	(Spain) Carlos del Barrio	3–5, 7–8, 10–11, 13–14
Hyundai	(South Korea) Hyundai Shell Mobis WRT	Hyundai i20 Coupe WRC	11	(Belgium) Thierry Neuville	(Belgium) Nicolas Gilsoul	All
Hyundai	(South Korea) Hyundai Shell Mobis WRT	Hyundai i20 Coupe WRC	18	(Republic of Ireland) Craig Breen	(Republic of Ireland) Paul Nagle	14
Hyundai	(South Korea) Hyundai Shell Mobis WRT	Hyundai i20 Coupe WRC	19	(France) Sébastien Loeb	(Monaco) Daniel Elena	1–2, 4, 6–7, 13
Hyundai	(South Korea) Hyundai Shell Mobis WRT	Hyundai i20 Coupe WRC	42	(Republic of Ireland) Craig Breen	(Republic of Ireland) Paul Nagle	9, 12
Hyundai	(South Korea) Hyundai Shell Mobis WRT	Hyundai i20 Coupe WRC	89	(Norway) Andreas Mikkelsen	(Norway) Anders Jæger-Amland	1–3, 5–6, 8–12
Toyota	(Japan) Toyota Gazoo Racing WRT	Toyota Yaris WRC	5	(United Kingdom) Kris Meeke	(United Kingdom) Sebastian Marshall	All
Toyota	(Japan) Toyota Gazoo Racing WRT	Toyota Yaris WRC	8	(Estonia) Ott Tänak	(Estonia) Martin Järveoja	All
Toyota	(Japan) Toyota Gazoo Racing WRT	Toyota Yaris WRC	10	(Finland) Jari-Matti Latvala	(Finland) Miikka Anttila	All

World Rally Car entries ineligible to score manufacturer points
Manufacturer	Entrant	Car	Crew details			
Manufacturer	Entrant	Car	No.	Driver name	Co-driver name	Rounds
Citroën	(Italy) Mauro Miele	Citroën DS3 WRC	20	(Italy) Mauro Miele	(Italy) Luca Beltrame	1
Citroën	(France) Jean-Charles Beaubelique	Citroën DS3 WRC	40	(France) Jean-Charles Beaubelique	(France) Julien Pesenti	4
Citroën	(France) Robert Simonetti	Citroën DS3 WRC	43	(France) Robert Simonetti	(France) Célia Simonetti	4
Citroën	(Belgium) Kris Princen	Citroën DS3 WRC	72	(Belgium) Kris Princen	(Belgium) Peter Kaspers	10
Ford	(Finland) JanPro	Ford Fiesta WRC	18	(Finland) Jouni Virtanen	(Finland) Risto Pietiläinen	9
Ford	(United Kingdom) M-Sport Ford WRT	Ford Fiesta WRC	37	(Italy) Lorenzo Bertelli	(Italy) Simone Scattolin	2, 6
Ford	(Finland) Janne Tuohino	Ford Fiesta WRC	92	(Finland) Janne Tuohino	(Finland) Mikko Markkula	2
Ford	(Czech Republic) MP-Sports	Ford Fiesta RS WRC	26	(Czech Republic) Martin Prokop	(Czech Republic) Jan Tománek	8
Ford	(France) Armando Pereira	Ford Fiesta RS WRC	41	(France) Armando Pereira	(France) Rémi Tutélaire	4
Ford	(France) Alain Vauthier	Ford Fiesta RS WRC	42	(France) Alain Vauthier	(France) Gilbert Dini	4
Toyota	(Finland) GRX Team	Toyota Yaris WRC	68	(Finland) Marcus Grönholm	(Finland) Timo Rautiainen	2
Toyota	(Finland) Tommi Mäkinen Racing	Toyota Yaris WRC	17	(Japan) Takamoto Katsuta	(United Kingdom) Daniel Barritt	10, 13
Toyota	(Finland) Tommi Mäkinen Racing	Toyota Yaris WRC	69	(Finland) Juho Hänninen	(Finland) Tomi Tuominen	8

=== Team changes ===
Citroën will only enter two cars for the entire season. The team had two full-time entries in 2018, with a third car run on a part-time basis. Citroën cited a change in sponsorship arrangements as being the reason behind the decision to forgo a third car. M-Sport Ford will also scale back to two full-time entries, with a third car entered on a round-by-round basis. Malcolm Wilson stepped down from his role as M-Sport Ford's team principal to oversee the company's wider commercial operations. Richard Millener was appointed as his replacement. Hyundai also replaced their team principal Michel Nandan with their customer racing manager Andrea Adamo. Toyota expanded to four cars, adding an additional car on a part-time basis. The fourth car will be run by Toyota's factory team, but entered under Marcus Grönholm's GRX Team banner.

=== Crew changes ===
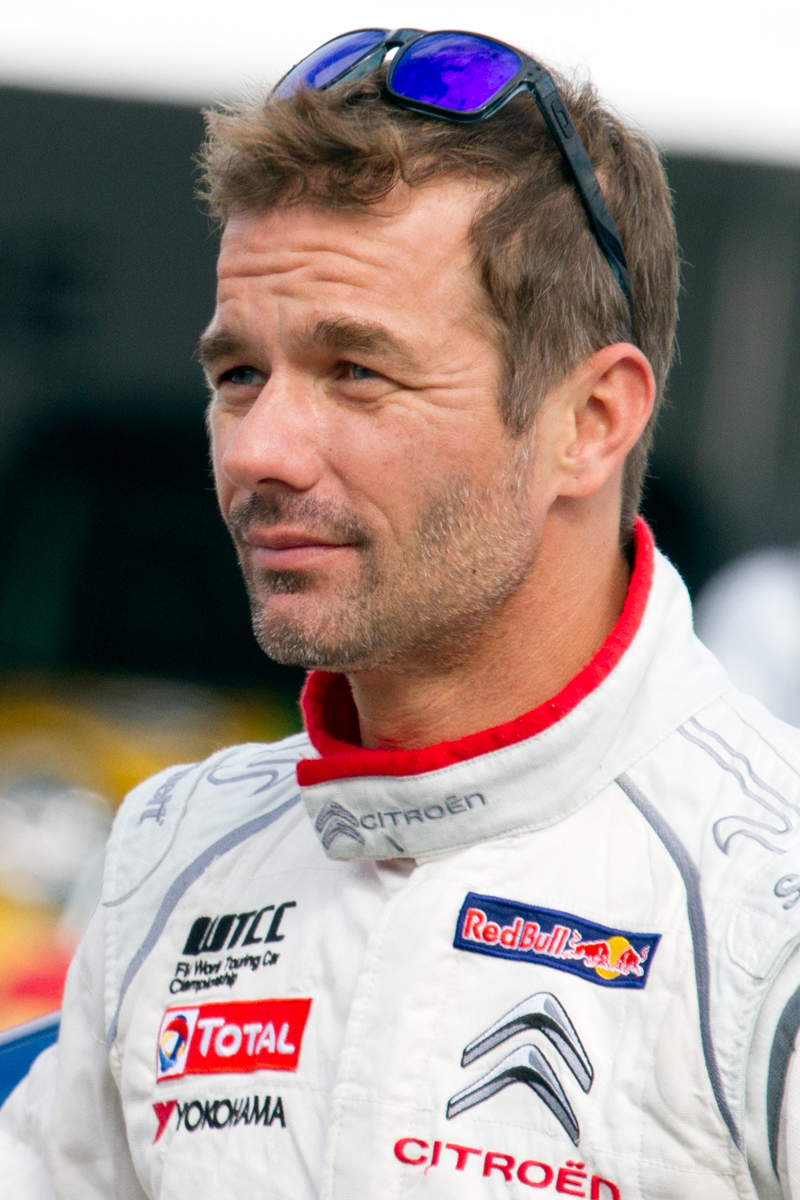
Sébastien Loeb contested six rallies with Hyundai.

Sébastien Ogier and Julien Ingrassia left M-Sport Ford and returned to Citroën. Ogier and Ingrassia had previously competed with the French manufacturer in 2011 before moving to Volkswagen Motorsport. Esapekka Lappi and Janne Ferm also joined the team after two years with Toyota. Craig Breen and Scott Martin left the team when Citroën announced that they would scale back their involvement in the championship to two full-time entries for Ogier and Lappi. They were unable to secure seats for the start of the championship, but Breen represented Hyundai to compete in Finland and Wales. Mads Østberg and Torstein Eriksen remained with the Citroën team, agreeing to a full-time factory campaign in the WRC2 class in R5 version of the C3. Later, they got an opportunity to drive a third Citroën C3 WRC in Australia to boost Ogier's title bid, but they withdrew before the rally starts as Ogier's title chance was over in Spain. Teemu Suninen was promoted to a full-time drive with M-Sport Ford, effectively replacing Ogier. Pontus Tidemand and Ola Fløene will contest selected rounds with M-Sport Ford. Tidemand and Fløene will share the third car with Gus Greensmith.

Two-time World Drivers' and Co-drivers' Champions Marcus Grönholm and Timo Rautiainen returned to the championship for the first time since 2010, making one-off appearance with Toyota. Sébastien Loeb and Daniel Elena signed a contract to contest six rounds with Hyundai, sharing an i20 with the crew of Dani Sordo and Carlos del Barrio. Hayden Paddon was set to enter the Rally Finland with M-Sport Ford after he left without a drive for the season, but a heavy crash during testing forced M-Sport to delay his planned return to Australia. Unfortunately, things did not work as planned as the rally was cancelled due to bushfires. Paddon's co-driver Sebastian Marshall moved to Toyota. He partnered Kris Meeke, who returned to full-time competition after being fired by Citroën halfway through the 2018 championship. Meeke's former co-driver Paul Nagle is due to cooperate with Crag Breen in Finland. Teemu Suninen also changed co-drivers, with Marko Salminen replacing Mikko Markkula. However, they ended their partnership before Sardegna as Jarmo Lehtinen took over Salminen's position. Daniel Barritt split with Elfyn Evans to partner Takamoto Katsuta in the WRC2; Evans instead was joined by Scott Martin. Katsuta and Barritt were later entered into Rallye Deutschland in a fourth Toyota.

== Rule changes ==
The maximum total distance of special stages per event was reduced from 500 km (310.7 mi) to 350 km (217.5 mi).

Drivers were permitted to choose a permanent number, similar to the numbering systems used in Formula 1, MotoGP and DTM. Prior to the 2019 championship, the numbering system was based on the manufacturers' championship standings from the previous year. The reigning world champions still competed with the number 1 and their permanent teammates were assigned the number 2.

The number of test days were reduced from 55, with teams permitted to test for 42 days per year.

The championship's support categories were restructured. WRC3 was discontinued and a new class was created within the WRC2. The class, known as WRC2 Pro, is open to manufacturer-supported teams entering cars complying with Group R5 regulations. Two-wheel drive cars and Group R2 and R3 cars are still eligible to enter rallies.

== Season report ==
=== Rallye Automobile Monte Carlo ===
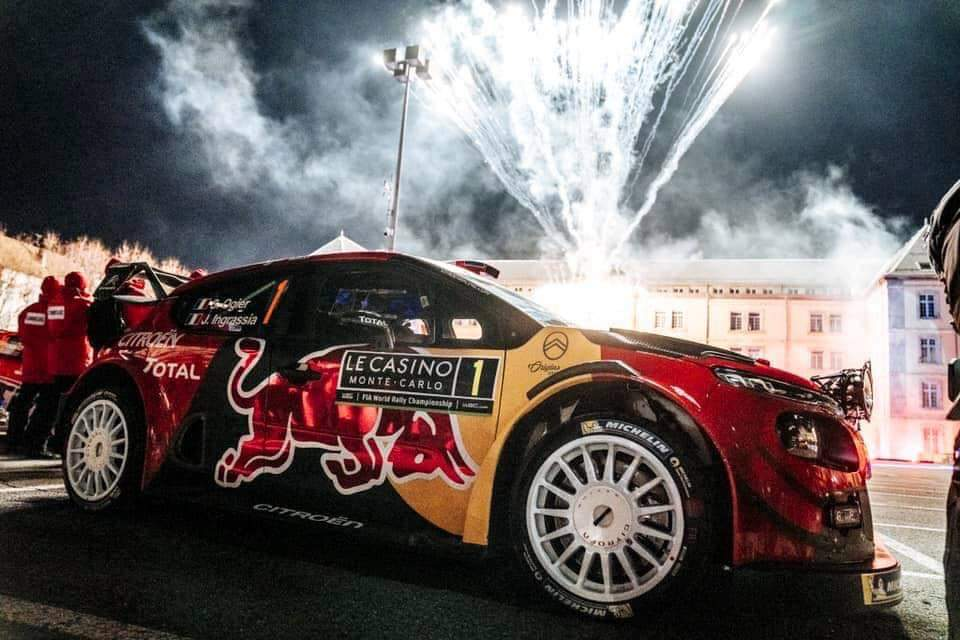
The Citroën C3 WRC of the rally winning crew Sébastien Ogier and Julien Ingrassia in the event.

The first round of the 2019 World Rally Championship saw another epic battle between the three rivals Sébastien Ogier, who started his new Citroën career this season, Thierry Neuville and Ott Tänak. The Estonian took an early lead during the first two night stages, but a puncture on Friday forced him to stop, which cost him two minutes to replace. Neuville then took a short-lived lead although he missed a junction at the same stage and lost around 20 seconds. However, Ogier hammered home his advantage on the following stage and ended the day by only 2.0 seconds. On Saturday and Sunday, Ogier and Neuville were neck and neck whereas Tänak started to chase time. He set four out of four fastest stage times at leg 2 and pulled himself back to fifth overall after Andreas Mikkelsen, Elfyn Evans and Esapekka Lappi retired from the rally due to lost wheel, off-road and suspension damage respectively. Having overtaken teammate Jari-Matti Latvala and nine-time world champion Sébastien Loeb, Tänak eventually finished at the podium, behind Ogier, who won the rally for the six straight years, and a 4.3-second-behind Neuville. From fourth to tenth were Loeb, Latvala, a returned Kris Meeke, who put his fifth power stage victory in his pocket, new championship WRC2 Pro winner Gus Greensmith, WRC2 winner Yoann Bonato, Stéphane Sarrazin and Adrien Fourmaux.

=== Rally Sweden ===
Coming into the only snow event in the calendar, Sébastien Ogier was first on the road. However, a small mistake caused him stuck in the snowbank and there were no spectators to push him out. As a result, Rally2 for the defending world champion. On the final stage of the first leg, Jari-Matti Latvala also went wide over a crest. By choosing to run under the Rally2 regulation, he reduced his time loss to just ten minutes. Teemu Suninen surprisingly put himself on top at the end of Friday, leading from Ott Tänak by 2 seconds but that surprise did not sustain to Saturday. Beaching his Fiesta in the morning loop dropped him down to eighth. Worse still, in the afternoon loop, he hit a tree and damaged his roll cage, which forced the young Finn to retire from the leg. Tänak then took over the rally and comfortably dominated to win his first snow rally in his career with his ninth power stage victory to take maximum points and go into the lead of the championship for the first time in his career. Although Esapekka Lappi almost rolled on Friday, he still successfully finished ahead of Thierry Neuville, who made a few mistakes at this weekend, by three seconds. Andreas Mikkelsen, who once occupied the second place, completed the rally in fourth in the end after a lucky escape from the snowbank on Saturday. From fifth to tenth were Elfyn Evans, Kris Meeke, nine-time world champion Sébastien Loeb, localman Pontus Tidemand, WRC2 winner Ole Christian Veiby and rally veteran Janne Tuohino.

=== Rally Guanajuato México ===
The high-altitude terrain of Rally Mexico provided difficult conditions for the drivers. Teemu Suninen was forced to retire from the rally when he went off the road only a few kilometers into the second stage. Andreas Mikkelsen led the rally until he hit a rock and damaged his suspension. Teammate Dani Sordo, who was the first time in a World Rally Car this season, suffered an electrical issue as he was fighting for the win. Jari-Matti Latvala was running in fourth before retiring with alternator failure. Esapekka Lappi got stuck and had to run under Rally2 regulation. Kris Meeke had a flat tyre and damaged his suspension, which dropped him from the lead down to fifth place. Although Sébastien Ogier had a puncture on the opening stage of leg 2, a red flag caused by his teammate Lappi's off saved his rally and eventually won the event with a power stage victory. Ott Tänak, who was first on the road on the first day, finished second, with Elfyn Evans rounding out of the podium. Thierry Neuville completed the rally in fourth after Friday's puncture, with Meeke in fifth. From sixth to tenth were WRC2 winner Benito Guerra, eighteen-year-old rising star Marco Bulacia Wilkinson, Latvala, Sordo and local driver Ricardo Triviño.

=== Tour de Corse ===
At Corsica, Elfyn Evans set amazing pace at the entire weekend and led the rally, as championship leader Ott Tänak suffered a puncture on Saturday. However, a front-right puncture in the ultimate power stage dropped the Brit down to third. Several more punctures also happened on Toyota duo Kris Meeke, who won another power stage, and Jari-Matti Latvala. In the end, it was Thierry Neuville that won the rally for the second time as well as his first season victory. With the victory, the Belgian moved two places to the top spot in the championship. So were their team, Hyundai. Defending world champion Sébastien Ogier finished ahead of Evans in second despite an early spin, following by tarmac expert Dani Sordo in fourth. Teemu Suninen completed the event in fifth and managed to stay ahead of championship contender Tänak in fifth after a trouble-free weekend, only 6.2 seconds behind Sordo. Esapekka Lappi, who was lack of paceat the whole weekend, finished in seventh. Nine-time world champion Sébastien Loeb finished the rally in eighth after a suspension damage on the very first stage, with Meeke and Latvala completing the top ten. This is the first time of the season that top ten were all covered by World Rally Cars.

=== Rally Argentina ===
Heavy rain hit Córdoba in the days leading up to the rally, making the road conditions very difficult. Thierry Neuville led at the end of the first leg after Ott Tänak spun on the last stage of the leg, which was later stopped due to an accident for Esapekka Lappi. The Estonian attempted to regain the time on the second leg, but he was forced to stop with a broken alternator. Elfyn Evans also retired during the day after hitting a rock and rolling his Fiesta. Sébastien Ogier lost time in the morning loop with a power steering failure, dropping him to fourth place behind Kris Meeke. Neuville was untroubled throughout the final day to claim a second Argentina win, whilst teammate Andreas Mikkelsen took advantage of other drivers' problems to finish second, his best result for Hyundai. Meeke lost out on third place to Ogier after a final stage puncture, the Citroën driver also winning the power stage. Jari-Matti Latvala had a quiet run to finish fifth, ahead of Dani Sordo, Teemu Suninen and the recovering Tänak. Leading WRC2 drivers Mads Østberg and Pedro Heller completed the points finishers.

=== Rally Chile ===
The head story of the brand new event was the huge crash of Thierry Neuville. The Belgian crashed violently after a right-hand blind crest, badly damaging his i20. Neuville's accident opened up the championship situation. With a second-place finish, defending world champion Sébastien Ogier regained the top spot with a ten-point lead ahead of Ott Tänak, who eventually won the rally together with the power stage. Following Tänak and Ogier, nine-time world champion Sébastien Loeb took his first podium this season in Hyundai. M-Sport Ford duos Elfyn Evans and Teemu Suninen completed in fourth and fifth respectively after a trouble-free weekend. From sixth to ninth were Esapekka Lappi, Andreas Mikkelsen, Pro winner Kalle Rovanperä and Mads Østberg. Kris Meeke originally finished in eighth after a roll on Saturday, but he received a ten-second time penalty for removing his damaged windscreen in a time control, which dropped him down to the tenth place. Jari-Matti Latvala recovered to eleventh after he hit a rock in the final test and broke his Toyota's driveshaft on Saturday.

=== Rally de Portugal ===
Rally de Portugal saw much drama this year. Nine-time world champion Sébastien Loeb and teammate Dani Sordo both suffered fuel system issue in the opening day. They dropped dramatically in the overall standing, which meant their only mission was to help their teammate Thierry Neuville — Both of them checked into stages late to play a double dose of tactics. Loeb also damaged his i20's suspension after hitting a bank in the power stage, while Gus Greensmith's WRC debut ended up with a crash in the same test. Esapekka Lappi was running fifth until he hit a bank and broke the rear left suspension in the final day. Jari-Matti Latvala retired from Saturday due to a damper issue, but he recovered to seventh in the final standings. Teammate Ott Tänak overcame the same issue and another brake problem and won his third rally of the season. Neuville and defending world champion Sébastien Ogier were the only two drivers to have a trouble-free weekend, rounding out of the podium. Teemu Suninen also suffered brake failure on Friday, but he carried on to claim the fourth spot. Teammate Elfyn Evans, who lost almost four minutes on the same day when his Fiesta stopped with an electrical problem, completed the rally in fifth. Pro winner Kalle Rovanperä snatched sixth despite an early puncture, with teammate Jan Kopecký in eighth. Pierre-Louis Loubet and Emil Bergkvist finished the event in ninth and tenth, respectively, to take their first career points in the World Rally Championship.

=== Rally Italia Sardegna ===
In Sardinia, Ott Tänak suffered a coaster-style pain. Because championship leader Sébastien Ogier retired from the first leg, Tänak became the road-opener, which affected greatly on his stage times. However, with a better road position on Saturday, the Estonian immediately blew away everyone until his Yaris' power steering failed in the ultimate power stage and dropped down to fifth, which sent a huge gift to Dani Sordo, who snatched his second career victory. However, fifth position was enough to elevate Tänak to the lead of the drivers' championship. Teammate Jari-Matti Latvala had two big moments on Friday. The Finn rolled his Yaris when he led the rally and went off the road later in the afternoon. Teemu Suninen finished a career-high second place with new co-driver Jarmo Lehtinen. Andreas Mikkelsen surpassed Elfyn Evans in the final power stage, separating by only 0.9 second. The Norwegian won his first power stage since 2015 Rally Catalunya as well. Thierry Neuville completed the rally in sixth after a troublesome weekend, following by Esapekka Lappi. Kris Meeke completed the event in the eighth spot after Saturday's puncture, with WRC2 Pro duos Kalle Rovanperä and Jan Kopecký completed the leaderboard.

=== Rally Finland ===
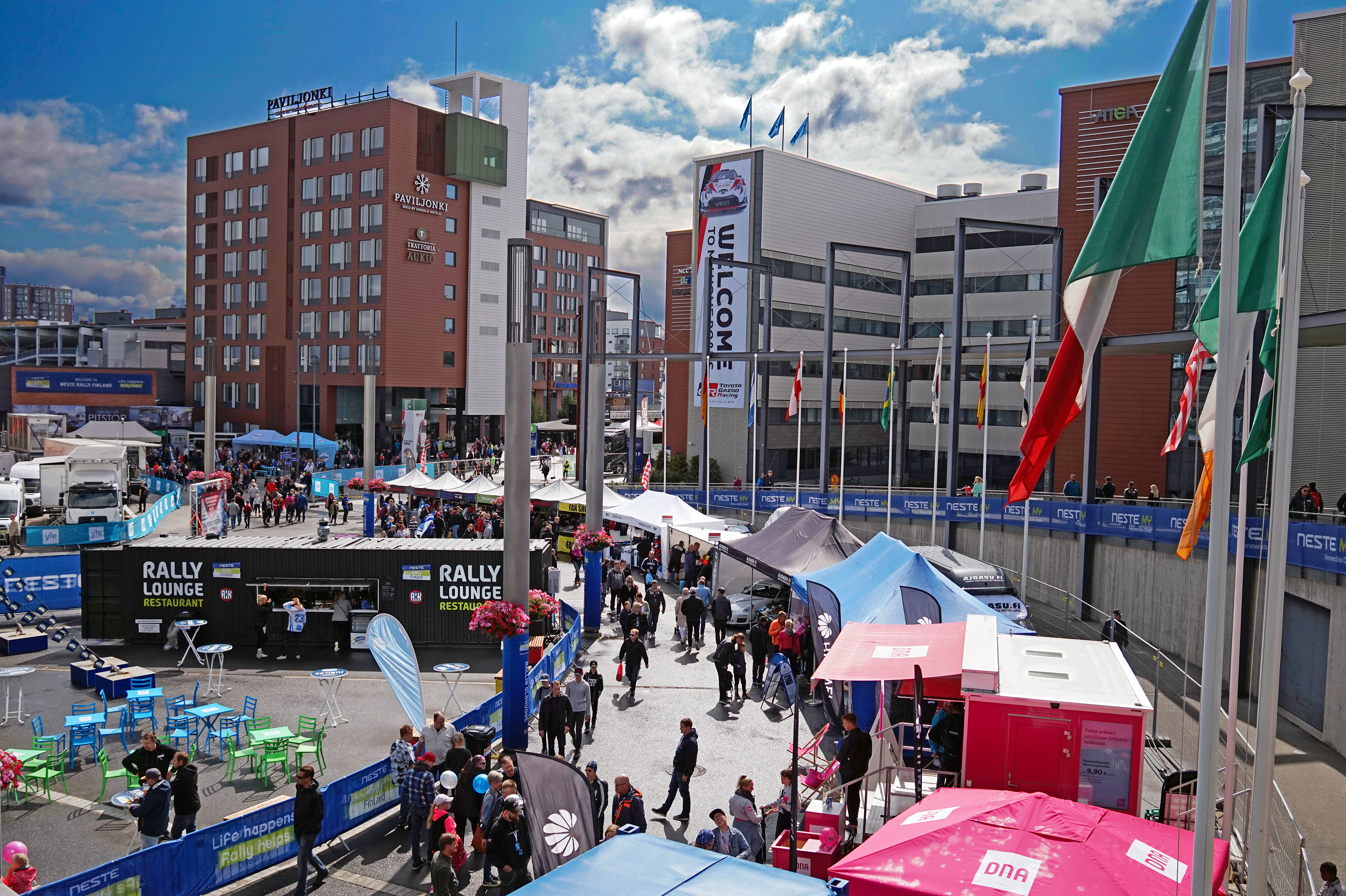
The service park of Rally Finland in 2019.

After the summer break, the World Rally Championship came to the fastest rally on the calendar. Before the rally began, Elfyn Evans withdrew from the rally due to a back injury. Hayden Paddon was scheduled to come back in a third Ford Fiesta WRC, but a heavy crash during testing forced M-Sport Ford to abandon his returning plan. When the event started, championship leader Ott Tänak was first on the road, but sweeping the road did not slow him down. Eventually, he successfully defended the rally with a power stage win to extend his championship lead to twenty-two points. It was the redemption weekend for tornado Tänak, who won his 200th stage victory during the event as well. Esapekka Lappi found his form back after struggling a lot in the first half of the season, finishing second overall in his home rally. Three-time winner Jari-Matti Latvala was leading the rally, but a driving error punctured his rear-left tyre in a right-hand corner, which dropped him down to third. Teammate Kris Meeke also ran wide at the same corner, but he damaged his rear-left suspension and was unable to continue. Although the Northern Irishman rejoined the rally on the final day, he still stopped again as he hit a rock. Following Meeke's retirement, there was an epic battle for the fourth place including defending world Sébastien Ogier, Andreas Mikkelsen and Craig Breen, who returned to championship in a third Hyundai. By virtue of was consistently fast performance, Mikkelsen stood out the other two, with Ogier in fifth. Breen was given a team order that let his championship contender teammate Thierry Neuville by on the leaderboard to take sixth. Teemu Suninen completed the rally following Breen in eighth after struggling to find pace during the weekend, with WRC2 Pro youngster Kalle Rovanperä and WRC2 class winner Nikolay Gryazin rounding out of the top ten. Gus Greensmith was the driver who replaced Paddon, but his rally was ended during SS20 after crashing into a tree.

=== ADAC Rallye Deutschland ===
"Cool like a cucumber" is what to describe the championship leader Ott Tänak, who got a hat-trick win on the German tarmac, although he did not push in the power stage due to brakes issue. However, Tänak's win was not so easy as there was an epic battle between him and title rival Thierry Neuville. The Belgian was running second overall, trailing Tänak by seconds, until a puncture in the longest Panzerplatte stage dropped him down, whilst reigning champion Sébastien Ogier suffered the same problem during the second pass through the same test. Following Neuville's and Ogier's drama, Kris Meeke and Jari-Matti Latvala elevated to second and third respectively to make Toyota finish 1–2–3 at the end of the rally. The last 1–2–3 finish was created by Volkswagen here back to 2015, when Sébastien Ogier, Jari-Matti Latvala and Andreas Mikkelsen covered out of the podium. Dani Sordo suffered a transmission issue on Friday afternoon, which stuck his Hyundai's gearbox in first. The Spaniard finished the rally in fourth before swapping places with teammate Neuville. Esapekka Lappi originally finished sixth, following by seventh-place Andreas Mikkelsen and eighth-spot teammate Ogier. However, the Finn did the same thing as what Sordo did to give the defending world champion an extra two points at the cost of letting Mikkelsen by as well. Gus Greensmith finished ninth despite breaking a driveshaft on Friday morning, with Japanese driver Takamoto Katsuta, who made his World Rally Car debut in a fourth Yaris, completed the top ten. Teemu Suninen retired from Friday due to mechanical failure, but he scored four bonus points from the power stage after rejoining the rally on Saturday.

=== Marmaris Rally of Turkey ===
Rally Turkey was full of dramas last year, and so was this year. The "rockstorm" caused several punctures, and none of the Toyota drivers, nor Dani Sordo stayed away from tyre troubles. Thierry Neuville elevated himself to third on Friday after a masterful drive in the second pass of the Çetibeli stage, but the Belgian went off the road due to poor visibility on Saturday. Ott Tänak took full five power stage bonus points after retiring from Saturday because of electrical failure. Following two championship contenders in nightmares, defending world champion Sébastien Ogier caught the chance. The six-time world champion eventually took his first Turkey victory to slash the gap between championship leader Tänak from forty points to seventeen points. Teammate Esapekka Lappi finished second to give Citroën an 1–2 finish for the first time since 2015, when Kris Meeke and Mads Østberg outshone everybody else in Argentina. Andreas Mikkelsen finished third to take his third podium of the season. Teemu Suninen completed the rally in fourth after a consistent weekend, following by Sordo and Jari-Matti Latvala. Meeke finished the event in seventh, although he went off the road in the afternoon loop of the second leg. Neuville and Pontus Tidemand finished the rally in eighth and ninth respectively. The final scoring spot could be covered by WRC2 winner Kajetan Kajetanowicz, but a broken driveshaft meant him miss the opportunity to score his first WRC point. The Polish driver lost the place to Gus Greensmith, who won the WRC2 Pro category despite rolling his Fiesta R5.

=== Wales Rally GB ===
The coming of the Hurricane Lorenzo meant Wales Rally GB would run under wet conditions this year. The typically muddy road surface caught out several drivers. Esapekka Lappi went off the road and retired from Friday, whilst Jari-Matti Latvala also dropped out completely when he rolled on Friday, his Yaris coming to rest against a tree. Despite teammate Ott Tänak suffering an engine issue on the opening stage of the rally, he easily made up the lost time and claimed his sixth rally win of the season along with a power stage victory, extending his championship lead to twenty-eight points. Championship rivals Thierry Neuville and Sébastien Ogier rounded out the podium. Early leader Kris Meeke finished fourth after a consistent weekend. Elfyn Evans returned to the championship after he missed three rounds due to back injury. Although he suffered a puncture on the first day, he set several fastest stage times and overtook Andreas Mikkelsen to snatch fifth spot. Teemu Suninen failed to restart on Sunday after hitting a bank and damaging his car on Saturday, which left the seventh place to teammate Pontus Tidemand. Craig Breen rolled his i20 on Saturday morning, but despite losing five minutes the damage was only cosmetic and he recovered to finish eighth. Kalle Rovanperä finished the rally in ninth and won the 2019 WRC2 Pro championship, while Petter Solberg completed the leaderboard in tenth. The 2003 World Champion won the WRC2 in a one-off drive to celebrate his retirement, ending his 20-year-long career in satisfaction.

=== RACC Rally Catalunya de España ===
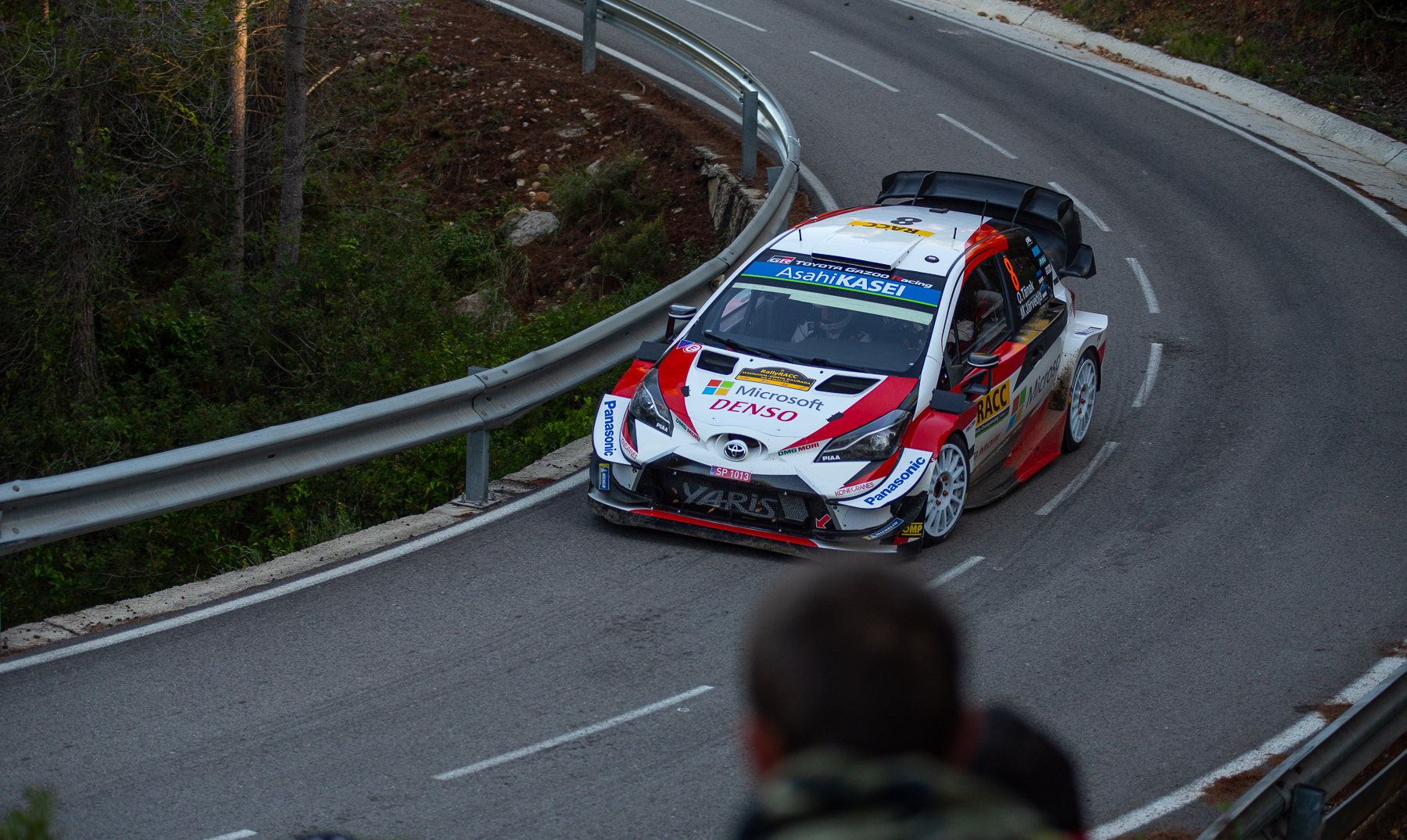
Ott Tänak and Martin Järveoja won their maiden World Rally Championship titles by finishing second overall.

It was a devastating blow for the reigning world champion Sébastien Ogier's title hope - having led after the opening stage, the six-time world champion's C3 was crawling through the rest of the morning loop due to loss of hydraulics. Coming to Spain, Thierry Neuville was forty-one points off the lead. To keep his championship alive, he had to score big points from the weekend. The Belgian eventually won the rally in style, so it was all down to how championship leader Ott Tänak reacted to Neuville's charge. The Estonian took a dominant power stage victory and snatched second place from local hero Dani Sordo in the final rally results, which was enough for him to seal his first World Rally Championship title in a commanding fashion. Tänak's title win ended the two French Sebastiens' dominance stretching a decade and a half. However, in the World Rally Championship for Manufacturers, Hyundai Shell Mobis WRT was able to extend their lead over the defending manufacturers' champion Toyota Gazoo Racing WRT with an 1–3 point-count finish. Nine-time world champion Sébastien Loeb finished fourth after being unable to find pace on tarmac, with Jari-Matti Latvala in fifth. M-Sport Ford duos Elfyn Evans and Teemu Suninen completed the rally in sixth and seventh respectively after both enjoyed a rather trouble-free weekend. Ogier, WRC2 Pro winner Mads Østberg and wider WRC2 class winner Eric Camilli covered out of the top ten. Esapekka Lappi was the only major retirement. The Finn ended his rally as his engine failed on Friday.

=== Rally Australia ===
The rally was cancelled due to bushfires in the Mid North Coast region. The organisers initially proposed a shortened route in lieu of the planned rally, which was developed with input from the New South Wales Rural Fire Service, but they were forced to cancel the event altogether as the bushfires intensified, rendering the area unsafe for the rally to proceed as planned. As a result, Hyundai Shell Mobis WRT won their first manufacturers' title.

== Results and standings ==
=== Season summary ===
Round	Event	Winning driver	Winning co-driver	Winning entrant	Winning time	Report	Ref.
1	(Monaco) Rallye Automobile Monte Carlo	(France) Sébastien Ogier	(France) Julien Ingrassia	(France) Citroën Total WRT	3:21:15.9	Report	
2	Rally Sweden	(Estonia) Ott Tänak	(Estonia) Martin Järveoja	(Japan) Toyota Gazoo Racing WRT	2:47:30.0	Report	
3	(Mexico) Rally Guanajuato México	(France) Sébastien Ogier	(France) Julien Ingrassia	(France) Citroën Total WRT	3:37:08.0	Report	
4	(France) Tour de Corse	(Belgium) Thierry Neuville	(Belgium) Nicolas Gilsoul	(South Korea) Hyundai Shell Mobis WRT	3:22:59.0	Report	
5	Rally Argentina	(Belgium) Thierry Neuville	(Belgium) Nicolas Gilsoul	(South Korea) Hyundai Shell Mobis WRT	3:20:54.6	Report	
6	Rally Chile	(Estonia) Ott Tänak	(Estonia) Martin Järveoja	(Japan) Toyota Gazoo Racing WRT	3:15:53.8	Report	
7	Rally de Portugal	(Estonia) Ott Tänak	(Estonia) Martin Järveoja	(Japan) Toyota Gazoo Racing WRT	3:20:22.8	Report	
8	(Italy) Rally Italia Sardegna	(Spain) Dani Sordo	(Spain) Carlos del Barrio	(South Korea) Hyundai Shell Mobis WRT	3:32:27.2	Report	
9	Rally Finland	(Estonia) Ott Tänak	(Estonia) Martin Järveoja	(Japan) Toyota Gazoo Racing WRT	2:30:40.3	Report	
10	(Germany) ADAC Rallye Deutschland	(Estonia) Ott Tänak	(Estonia) Martin Järveoja	(Japan) Toyota Gazoo Racing WRT	3:15:29.8	Report	
11	Marmaris Rally of Turkey	(France) Sébastien Ogier	(France) Julien Ingrassia	(France) Citroën Total WRT	3:50:12.1	Report	
12	(United Kingdom) Wales Rally GB	(Estonia) Ott Tänak	(Estonia) Martin Järveoja	(Japan) Toyota Gazoo Racing WRT	3:00:58.0	Report	
13	(Spain) RACC Rally Catalunya de España	(Belgium) Thierry Neuville	(Belgium) Nicolas Gilsoul	(South Korea) Hyundai Shell Mobis WRT	3:07:39.6	Report	
14	Rally Australia	Rally cancelled (due to bushfires)				Report	

=== Scoring system ===
Points were awarded to the top ten classified finishers in each event. In the manufacturers' championship, teams were eligible to nominate three crews to score points, but these points were only awarded to the top two classified finishers representing a manufacturer and driving a 2017-specification World Rally Car. There were also five bonus points awarded to the winners of the Power Stage, four points for second place, three for third, two for fourth and one for fifth. Power Stage points were only awarded in the drivers' and co-drivers' championships.

Position	1st	2nd	3rd	4th	5th	6th	7th	8th	9th	10th
Points	25	18	15	12	10	8	6	4	2	1

=== FIA World Rally Championship for Drivers ===
Pos.	Driver	MON (Monaco)	SWE (Sweden)	MEX (Mexico)	COR (France)	ARG (Argentina)	CHI (Chile)	POR (Portugal)	ITA (Italy)	FIN (Finland)	DEU (Germany)	TUR (Turkey)	GBR (United Kingdom)	CAT (Spain)	AUS (Australia)	Points
1	(Estonia) Ott Tänak	3^{4}	1^{1}	2	6^{2}	8^{5}	1^{1}	1^{3}	5	1^{1}	1	16^{1}	1^{1}	2^{1}	C	263
2	(Belgium) Thierry Neuville	2^{3}	3^{2}	4^{3}	1^{4}	1^{3}	Ret	2^{2}	6^{3}	6^{2}	4^{1}	8^{2}	2^{5}	1^{3}	C	227
3	(France) Sébastien Ogier	1^{2}	29^{4}	1^{1}	2^{5}	3^{1}	2^{2}	3^{1}	41^{2}	5^{4}	7^{5}	1^{3}	3^{2}	8^{5}	C	217
4	(Norway) Andreas Mikkelsen	Ret	4	Ret		2	7		3^{1}	4^{3}	6	3	6		WD	102
5	(United Kingdom) Elfyn Evans	Ret	5^{3}	3	3	Ret	4	5	4^{5}	WD		WD	5^{4}	6^{2}	C	102
6	(United Kingdom) Kris Meeke	6^{1}	6	5^{2}	9^{1}	4	10^{5}	Ret	8	Ret	2^{4}	7	4	29	C	98
7	(Finland) Jari-Matti Latvala	5	21	8	10	5^{2}	11^{3}	7	19^{4}	3^{5}	3^{3}	6^{4}	Ret	5	C	94
8	(Spain) Dani Sordo			9^{4}	4	6^{4}		23^{5}	1		5	5		3^{4}	C	89
9	(Finland) Teemu Suninen	11^{5}	23	Ret	5^{3}	7	5	4^{4}	2	8	29^{2}	4^{5}	Ret	7	C	89
10	(Finland) Esapekka Lappi	Ret	2^{5}	13^{5}	7	Ret	6	Ret	7	2	8	2	27^{3}	Ret	C	83
11	(France) Sébastien Loeb	4	7		8		3^{4}	Ret						4		51
12	(Finland) Kalle Rovanperä	18	18		Ret		8	6	9	9	16	18	9	12		18
13	(Sweden) Pontus Tidemand	20	8								WD	9	7			12
14	(Republic of Ireland) Craig Breen									7			8		C	10
15	(United Kingdom) Gus Greensmith	7	19			15	12	Ret	42	Ret	9	10	33	15		9
16	(Mexico) Benito Guerra			6		12	16	14					20	Ret	C	8
17	(Bolivia) Marco Bulacia Wilkinson			7		Ret	15		14			13	15	Ret	WD	6
18	(Norway) Mads Østberg		11			9	9	24	18		17		45	9	WD	6
19	(Czech Republic) Jan Kopecký							8	10		11	11	18	11	WD	5
20	(France) Yoann Bonato	8			49											4
21	(France) Pierre-Louis Loubet				44			9	11	14			12	17	C	2
22	(Norway) Ole Christian Veiby	12	9		Ret			Ret	20				35	16		2
23	(France) Stéphane Sarrazin	9									Ret					2
24	(Russia) Nikolay Gryazin		15		12			13	Ret	10	20	WD	13	23		1
25	(Japan) Takamoto Katsuta	13	Ret		14	16	14	21	Ret	Ret	10		14	39		1
26	(France) Eric Camilli				Ret					13	15			10		1
27	(Sweden) Emil Bergkvist		14					10	WD							1
28	(France) Adrien Fourmaux	10	45		30				36	23	23		16	32		1
29	(Chile) Pedro Heller			Ret		10	28									1
30	(Finland) Janne Tuohino		10													1
31	(Mexico) Ricardo Triviño			10												1
32	(Norway) Petter Solberg												10			1
Pos.	Driver	MON (Monaco)	SWE (Sweden)	MEX (Mexico)	COR (France)	ARG (Argentina)	CHI (Chile)	POR (Portugal)	ITA (Italy)	FIN (Finland)	DEU (Germany)	TUR (Turkey)	GBR (United Kingdom)	CAT (Spain)	AUS (Australia)	Points

Key
Colour	Result
Gold	Winner
Silver	2nd place
Bronze	3rd place
Green	Points finish
Blue	Non-points finish
Blue	Non-classified finish (NC)
Purple	Did not finish (Ret)
Black	Excluded (EX)
Black	Disqualified (DSQ)
White	Did not start (DNS)
White	Cancelled (C)
Blank	Withdrew entry from the event (WD)

Notes:
^{1 2 3 4 5} – Power Stage position

=== FIA World Rally Championship for Co-Drivers ===
Pos.	Co-Driver	MON (Monaco)	SWE (Sweden)	MEX (Mexico)	COR (France)	ARG (Argentina)	CHI (Chile)	POR (Portugal)	ITA (Italy)	FIN (Finland)	DEU (Germany)	TUR (Turkey)	GBR (United Kingdom)	CAT (Spain)	AUS (Australia)	Points
1	(Estonia) Martin Järveoja	3^{4}	1^{1}	2	6^{2}	8^{5}	1^{1}	1^{3}	5	1^{1}	1	16^{1}	1^{1}	2^{1}	C	263
2	(Belgium) Nicolas Gilsoul	2^{3}	3^{2}	4^{3}	1^{4}	1^{3}	Ret	2^{2}	6^{3}	6^{2}	4^{1}	8^{2}	2^{5}	1^{3}	C	227
3	(France) Julien Ingrassia	1^{2}	29^{4}	1^{1}	2^{5}	3^{1}	2^{2}	3^{1}	41^{2}	5^{4}	7^{5}	1^{3}	3^{2}	8^{5}	C	217
4	(Norway) Anders Jæger-Amland	Ret	4	Ret		2	7		3^{1}	4^{3}	6	3	6		WD	102
5	(United Kingdom) Scott Martin	Ret	5^{3}	3	3	Ret	4	5	4^{5}	WD		WD	5^{4}	6^{2}	C	102
6	(United Kingdom) Sebastian Marshall	6^{1}	6	5^{2}	9^{1}	4	10^{5}	Ret	8	Ret	2^{4}	7	4	29	C	98
7	(Finland) Miikka Anttila	5	21	8	10	5^{2}	11^{3}	7	19^{4}	3^{5}	3^{3}	6^{4}	Ret	5	C	94
8	(Spain) Carlos del Barrio			9^{4}	4	6^{4}		23^{5}	1		5	5		3^{4}	C	89
9	(Finland) Janne Ferm	Ret	2^{5}	13^{5}	7	Ret	6	Ret	7	2	8	2	27^{3}	Ret	C	83
10	(Monaco) Daniel Elena	4	7		8		3^{4}	Ret						4		51
11	(Finland) Jarmo Lehtinen								2	8	29^{2}	4^{5}	Ret	7	C	45
12	(Finland) Marko Salminen	11^{5}	23	Ret	5^{3}	7	5	4^{4}								44
13	(Finland) Jonne Halttunen	18	18		Ret		8	6	9	9	16	18	9	12		18
14	(Norway) Ola Fløene	20	8								WD	9	7			12
15	(Republic of Ireland) Paul Nagle									7			8		C	10
16	(United Kingdom) Elliott Edmondson	7	19			15	12	Ret	42	Ret	9	10	33	15		9
17	(Mexico) Jaime Zapata			6		12	16	14								8
18	(Argentina) Fabian Cretu			7		Ret	15		14			13	15	Ret	WD	6
19	(Norway) Torstein Eriksen		11			9	9	24	18		17		45	9	WD	6
20	(Czech Republic) Pavel Dresler							8	10		11	11				5
21	(France) Benjamin Boulloud	8			49											4
22	(France) Vincent Landais				44			9	11	14			12	17	C	2
23	(Sweden) Jonas Andersson	12	9		Ret			Ret	20				35	16		2
24	(France) Jacques-Julien Renucci	9									Ret					2
25	(Spain) Marc Martí			10	Ret	10	28		Ret					21		2
26	(Russia) Yaroslav Fedorov		15		12			13	Ret	10	20	WD	13	23		1
27	(United Kingdom) Daniel Barritt	13	Ret		14	16	14	21	Ret	Ret	10		14	39		1
28	(France) Benjamin Veillas									13	15			10		1
29	(Sweden) Patrik Barth		14					10	WD							1
30	(Belgium) Renaud Jamoul	10	45		30				36	23	23		16	32		1
31	(Finland) Mikko Markkula		10													1
32	(United Kingdom) Phil Mills												10			1
Pos.	Co-Driver	MON (Monaco)	SWE (Sweden)	MEX (Mexico)	COR (France)	ARG (Argentina)	CHI (Chile)	POR (Portugal)	ITA (Italy)	FIN (Finland)	DEU (Germany)	TUR (Turkey)	GBR (United Kingdom)	CAT (Spain)	AUS (Australia)	Points

Key
Colour	Result
Gold	Winner
Silver	2nd place
Bronze	3rd place
Green	Points finish
Blue	Non-points finish
Blue	Non-classified finish (NC)
Purple	Did not finish (Ret)
Black	Excluded (EX)
Black	Disqualified (DSQ)
White	Did not start (DNS)
White	Cancelled (C)
Blank	Withdrew entry from the event (WD)

Notes:
^{1 2 3 4 5} – Power Stage position

=== FIA World Rally Championship for Manufacturers ===
Only the best two results of every manufacturer at each rally were counted for the manufacturers' championship.

Pos.	Entrant	MON (Monaco)	SWE (Sweden)	MEX (Mexico)	COR (France)	ARG (Argentina)	CHI (Chile)	POR (Portugal)	ITA (Italy)	FIN (Finland)	DEU (Germany)	TUR (Turkey)	GBR (United Kingdom)	CAT (Spain)	AUS (Australia)	Points
1	(South Korea) Hyundai Shell Mobis WRT	2	3	4	1	1	3	2	1	4	3	3	2	1	C	380
1	(South Korea) Hyundai Shell Mobis WRT	4	4	6	4	2	7	7	3	6	4	5	6	3	C	380
2	(Japan) Toyota Gazoo Racing WRT	3	1	2	6	4	1	1	5	1	1	6	1	2	C	362
2	(Japan) Toyota Gazoo Racing WRT	5	6	5	8	5	8	6	7	3	2	7	4	4	C	362
3	(France) Citroën Total WRT	1	2	1	2	3	2	3	6	2	5	1	3	7	C	284
3	(France) Citroën Total WRT	Ret	8	7	7	Ret	6	Ret	8	5	6	2	8	Ret	C	284
4	(United Kingdom) M-Sport Ford WRT	6	5	3	3	6	4	4	2	7	7	4	5	5	C	218
4	(United Kingdom) M-Sport Ford WRT	7	7	Ret	5	Ret	5	5	4	Ret	8	8	7	6	C	218
Pos.	Entrant	MON (Monaco)	SWE (Sweden)	MEX (Mexico)	COR (France)	ARG (Argentina)	CHI (Chile)	POR (Portugal)	ITA (Italy)	FIN (Finland)	DEU (Germany)	TUR (Turkey)	GBR (United Kingdom)	CAT (Spain)	AUS (Australia)	Points

Key
Colour	Result
Gold	Winner
Silver	2nd place
Bronze	3rd place
Green	Points finish
Blue	Non-points finish
Blue	Non-classified finish (NC)
Purple	Did not finish (Ret)
Black	Excluded (EX)
Black	Disqualified (DSQ)
White	Did not start (DNS)
White	Cancelled (C)
Blank	Withdrew entry from the event (WD)
