= Andrea Adamo =

Andrea Adamo may refer to:

- Andrea Adamo (footballer) (born 1991), Italian footballer
- Andrea Adamo (motocross racer) (born 2003), Italian motocross racer
- Andrea Adamo (racing manager) (born 1971), Italian engineer and racing manager
