= Andrea Adamo (racing manager) =

Team Principal of Hyundai World Rally Team

- Born: 25 May 1971 (age 55); Cuneo, Piedmont, Italy
- Occupation: Team principal
- Employer: Hyundai Shell Mobis WRT

Andrea Adamo (born 25 May 1971 in Turin, Italy), is an Italian engineer and racing manager. He was appointed to the role of Hyundai Shell Mobis WRT team principal in the World Rally Championship in January 2019, replacing Michel Nandan. Under his leadership, the team secured their maiden manufacturers' title in 2019.

== Career ==
Between 1995 and 2008, he worked as an aerodynamics technician, race engineer, head designer and technical director in the DTM and Superturismo championships with N.Technology. From 2009 to 2011 he was at Lola where he designed several cars for the Le Mans Prototype category. He also worked on a Porsche Panamera for the Superstars Series.

In 2012, he became chief engineer at JAS Motorsport for the World Touring Car Championship. In 2015, he moved briefly to FCA Italy, where he took part in the design of the Alfa Romeo Giulia production model.

In 2015, he joined Hyundai Motorsport as head of sports programmes for customer teams. In January 2019, he was promoted to team principal of the official Hyundai team in the World Rally Championship, taking over from Michel Nandan. Under his leadership, the team won the constructors' title in the 2019 season, the first in the history of the South Korean manufacturer, and repeated the following year. He stepped down from his positions at Hyundai in December 2021.

Year	Occupations
1995–2008	Working as aerodynamics developer, race engineering, head designer, technical director in DTM and Super Touring Series with N.Technology
2009–2011	Lola LMP cars projects Porsche Panamera for Superstars Series projects
2012–2015	WTCC chief engineer of Honda Racing
2015	Responsible for the Alfa Romeo Giulia civilian car
2015–2018	Hyundai Customer Program manager
2019–2021	Hyundai Shell Mobis World Rally Team team principal
