= Dani Sordo =

Spanish rally driver (born 1983)

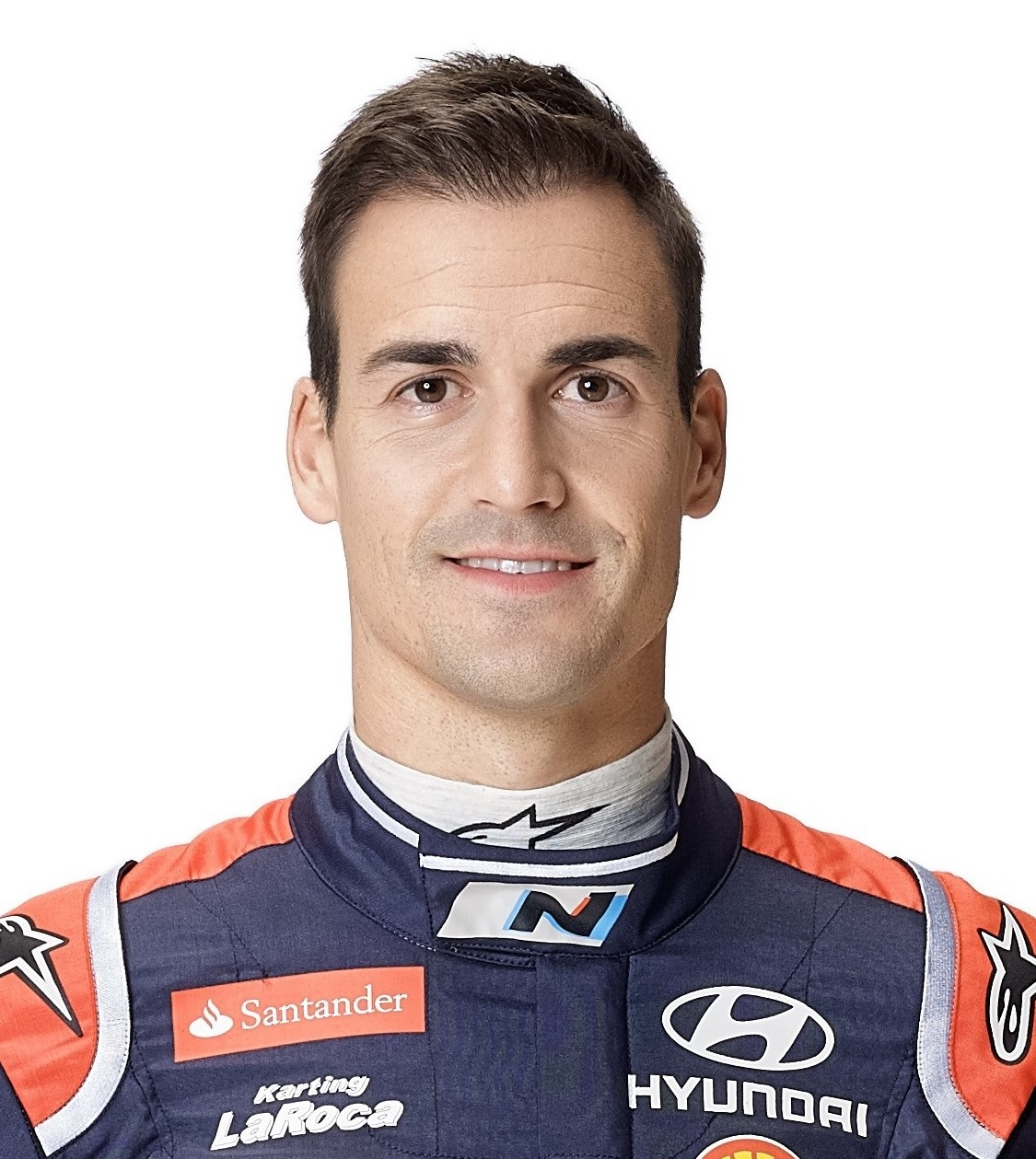
- Sordo in 2014

Personal information
- Nationality: (Spain) Spanish
- Full name: Daniel Sordo Castillo
- Born: 2 May 1983 (age 43); Puente San Miguel, Cantabria

World Rally Championship record
- Years active: 2003–present
- Co-driver: (Spain) Juan Antonio Castillo (Spain) Carlos del Barrio (Spain) Marc Martí (Spain) Oriol Julià (Spain) Diego Vallejo (Spain) Borja Rozada (Spain) Cándido Carrera
- Teams: Kronos Citroën, Citroën, Mini, Ford, Hyundai
- Rallies: 196
- Championships: 0
- Rally wins: 3
- Podiums: 58
- Stage wins: 229
- Total points: 1413
- First rally: 2003 Rally Catalunya
- First win: 2013 Rallye Deutschland
- Last win: 2020 Rally Italia Sardegna
- Last rally: 2026 Acropolis Rally

Daniel Sordo Castillo (born 2 May 1983) is a Spanish rally driver. He competes in the World Rally Championship for Hyundai Motorsport. He achieved his first WRC victory at the 2013 Rallye Deutschland.

== Career ==
Sordo began in motocross when he was 12 years old, but also experienced success in hillclimbing, karting and touring cars. He first drove in a World Rally Championship event at the Rally Catalunya, the Spanish round of the series, in 2003 in a Mitsubishi Lancer Evo VII, finishing 18th overall. He won the Spanish Junior Championship that year, and retained the title in 2004, while also accumulating further international experience at the WRC events in Argentina (retired), Germany (19th), France (13th) and Spain (20th).

In this last event, Sordo switched from the Lancer Evo to a Citroën C2 S1600, and for 2005 he committed to a full season driving the C2 in the Junior World Rally Championship (JWRC) with Belgium's Kronos Racing team. He also switched co-drivers, pairing with Marc Martí, the former co-driver of double World Champion Carlos Sainz. Victories in Sardinia, Finland, Germany and Spain brought him the junior world title.

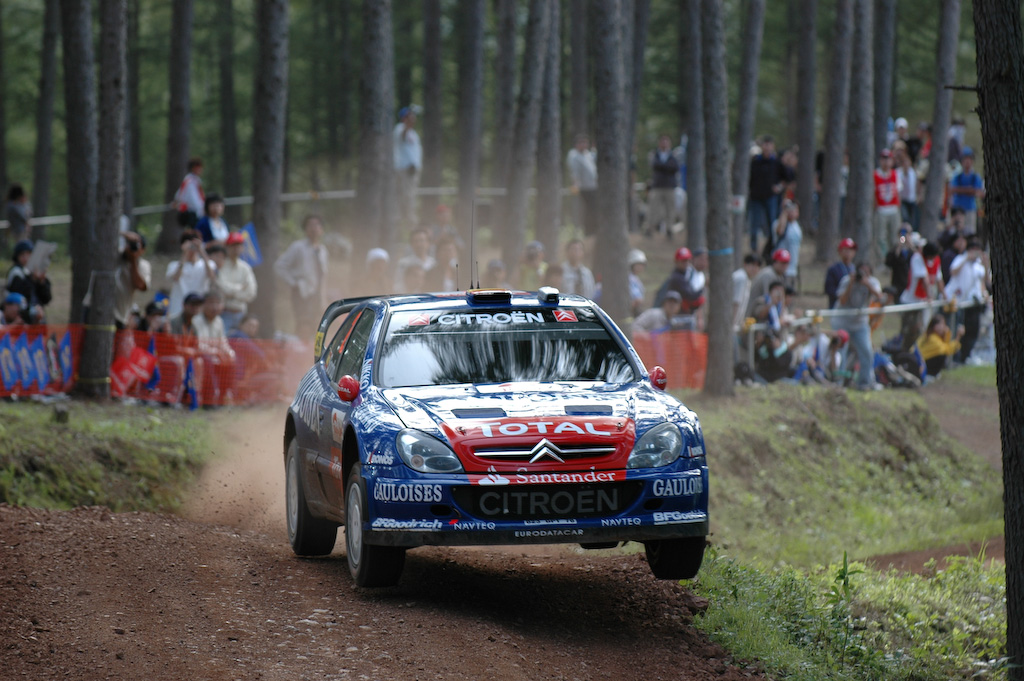
Sordo driving a Citroën Xsara WRC at the 2006 Rally Japan.

These showings earned Sordo a subsequent drive in a Kronos Total Citroën-prepared Xsara World Rally Car as the team's third driver in the 2006 season, although the initial plan - latterly dropped - was for the Spaniard to combine a piecemeal World Rally Car programme with a simultaneous defence of the JWRC title in the C2.

Sordo's early results though, including successive podiums at the Rally Catalunya and the Rallye de France, proved sufficient to not only expand his complement of contested events, but also ensure promotion to the second driver berth from the Rallye Deutschland onwards, alongside Sébastien Loeb and ahead of team-mate Xavier Pons. Sordo finished the 2006 season with four podium places, 49 points and a fifth overall in the drivers' world championship.

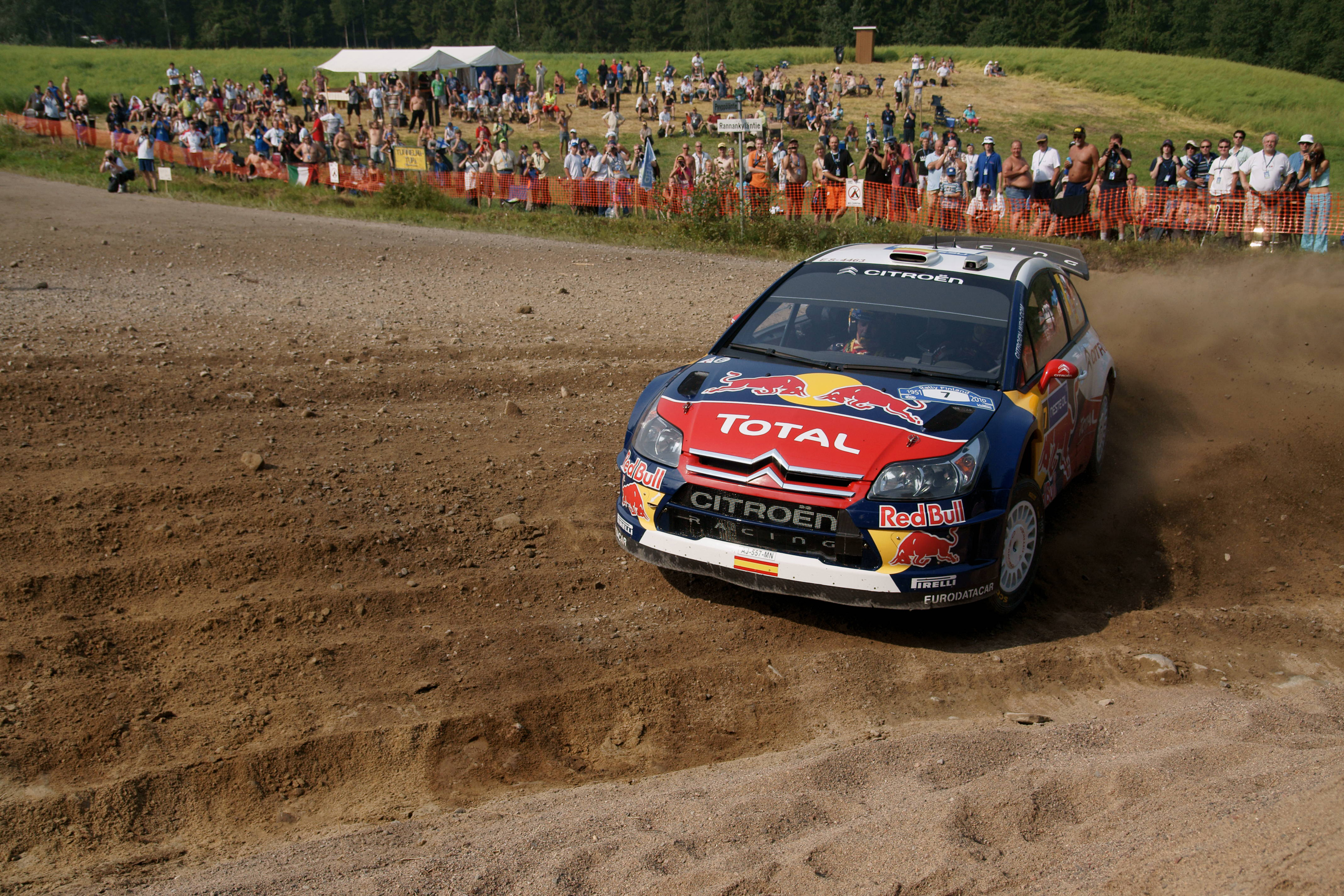
Sordo driving a Citroën C4 WRC at the 2010 Rally Finland.

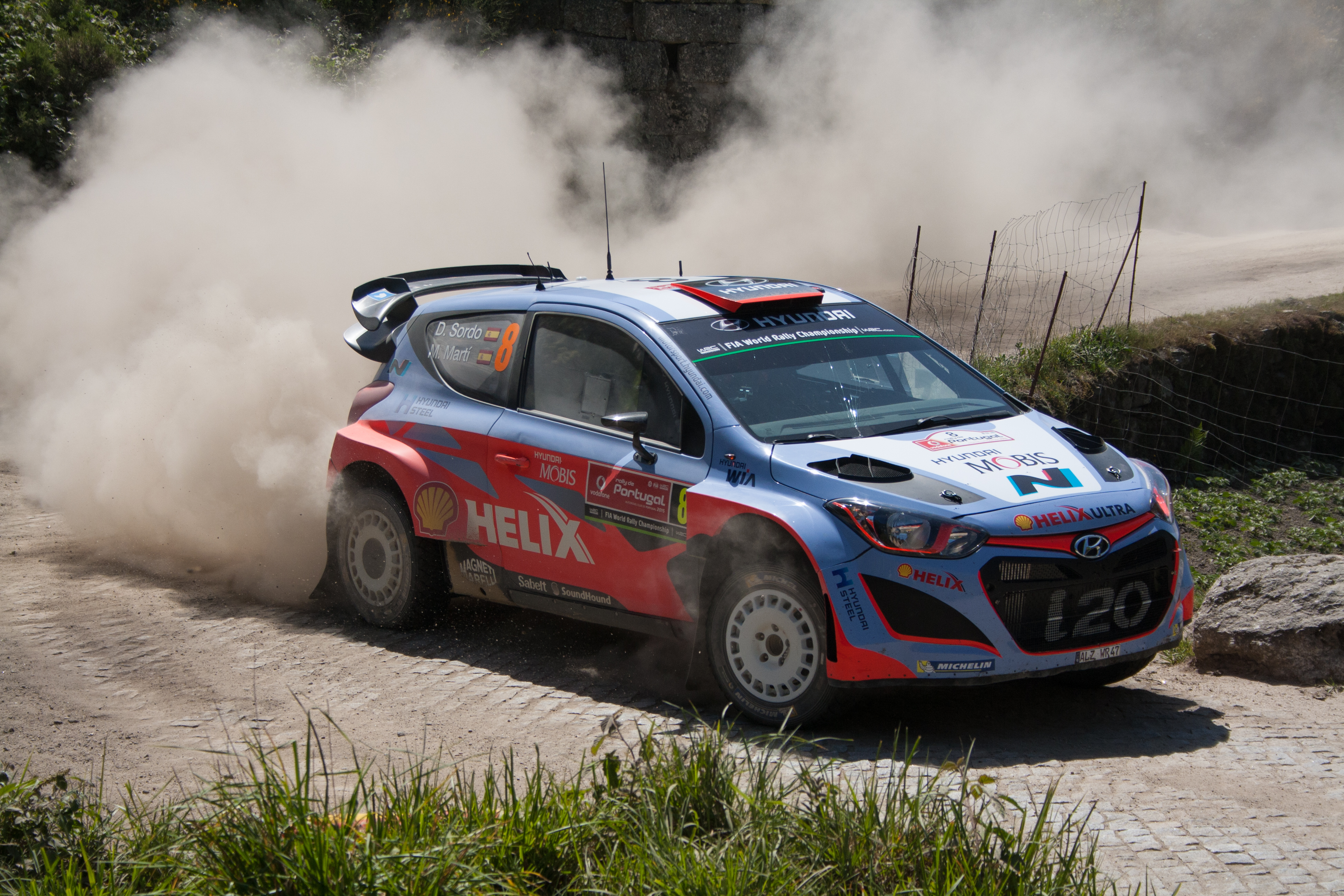
Sordo driving a Hyundai i20 WRC at the 2015 Rally de Portugal.

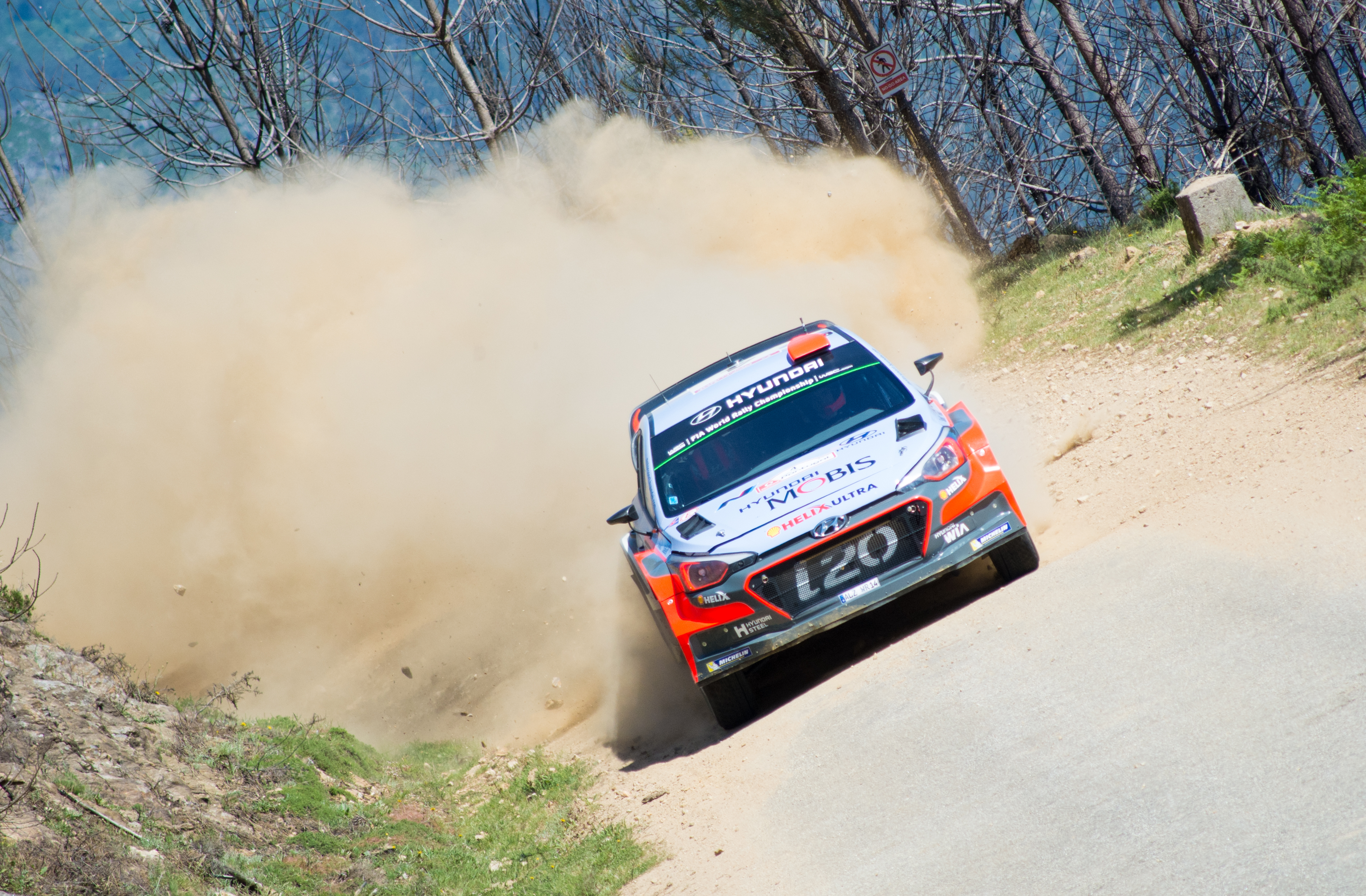
Sordo driving a Hyundai i20 WRC at the 2016 Rally de Portugal.

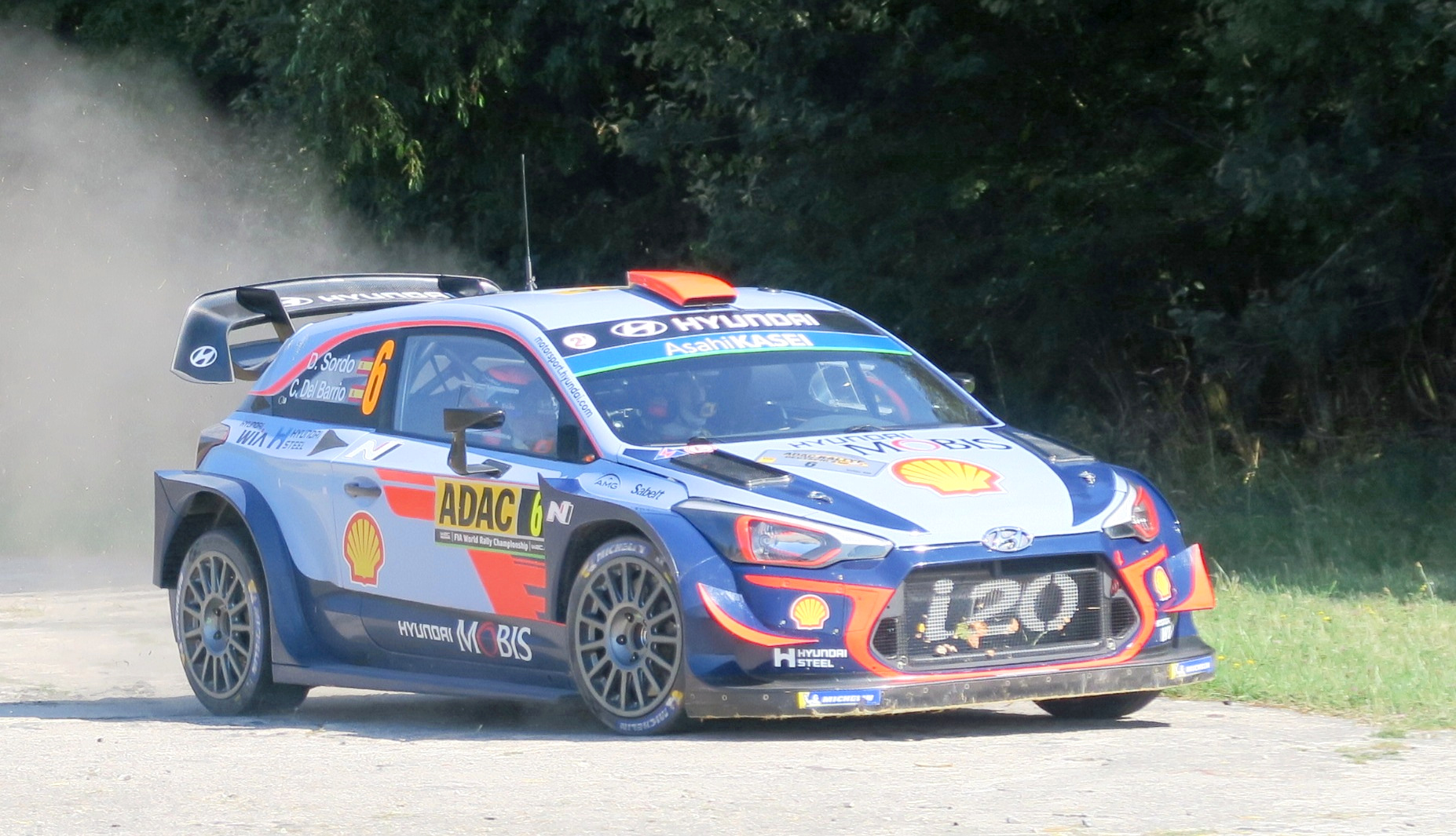
Sordo in his Hyundai i20 WRC for the 2018 Rallye Deutschland.

Citroën Sport then announced that Sordo will be their second driver for their 2007 season works team return. Sébastien Loeb would lead the team's push to win another title, this time using the C4 instead of Xsara. Sordo started the season with a second place at the 2007 Monte Carlo Rally and went on to finish on the podium six more times; in Portugal, Italy, Spain, where he also led a WRC event for the first time in his career, France, Japan and Ireland. With 65 points, he placed fourth overall in the drivers' championship, behind his teammate Loeb and BP Ford World Rally Team's Marcus Grönholm and Mikko Hirvonen.

In the 2008 season, after only three points in the first three events, Sordo finished third in Argentina and second in Jordan. On 12 July Sordo won the SM O.K. Auto-Ralli, the fifth round of the Finnish Rally Championship. Initially, he only planned to use the event as a test session when Citroën decided to competitively enroll him in the event to build confidence in preparation for the 2008 Rally Finland. Sordo's win marks his first in a WRC car. Citroën is also believed to have been testing out new parts at this event as a few slight modifications could be noticed in a few cars.

Back in the World Rally Championship, Sordo took fourth place in Finland and went on to drive his C4 WRC to three consecutive runner-up finishes behind his teammate Loeb; in Germany, New Zealand and Spain. With these results, Citroën passed Ford and took a 27-point lead in the manufacturers' world championship. At the season-ending Wales Rally GB, Loeb and Sordo secured the team their fourth manufacturers' crown by finishing first and third, respectively. Sordo finished a career-best third in the drivers' standings.

In the 2010 WRC season, Sordo scored a fourth place in the opening round Rally Sweden, while he scored no points in the following round in Rally Mexico. In the third round in Rally Jordan, he scored another fourth place, in the Turkish Rally, he was forced to retire, while in Rally New Zealand, he scored fifth place and in the Rally of Portugal he scored his first podium finish of the year. In Rally Bulgaria, Sordo finished in second place behind his team leader Loeb, giving his Citroën team their first one-two finish of the season. However, he was replaced by Sebastien Ogier for the remaining gravel events of the season in the works team, and was demoted to the Citroën Junior Team alongside Kimi Räikkönen. In Rally Finland, Sordo finished fourth, and from Rally Deutschland onwards, he swapped his co-driver to Diego Vallejo. In Rally Deutschland itself, Sordo scored another second place podium. In the following Rally in Japan, he finished fourth and in Rally Alsace second again. At the end of the season, he had 63 points using the old scoring system in fifth place.

For the 2011 season, Sordo joined MINI in their first year in the WRC, securing two podiums with third in Germany and second in France, respectively. He also finished fourth in Spain and sixth in the first round for MINI in Sardegnia.

For 2012, he continued his partnership with MINI for their first full season beginning with the Monte Carlo Rally, where he took his first podium for 2012 finishing in second place. However, in Sweden he went off-road and scored no points. Sordo did not compete in the Rally Mexico due to MINI separating from Prodrive. A round later, however, after some more than 100 modifications to the MINI, Sordo won six stages including the power stage. Sordo was set to replace Ford's number one driver Jari-Matti Latvala in Argentina, after the Finn was injured in practice for the upcoming event, the only event he drove for Ford, after which he competed in New-Zealand, Germany, France and Spain for Prodrive as the team tried to focus on the sealed surfaces.

Besides competing in the WRC for 2012, Sordo participated in the IRC in the Tour de Corse in a MINI. He won the event and took his maiden win in the IRC championship. After two seasons in the Prodrive (MINI) Team, Sordo rejoined Citroën for 2013 driving the second DS3 WRC.

At 2013 Rallye Deustchland, Sordo was in a stable third position in the second of three days, but after first placed Jari-Matti Latvala and second placed Thierry Neuville both left the road, Sordo found himself in the lead, with the Belgian just 0.8 seconds behind him at the end of the day, with just two stages to go. He eventually managed to hold on to first place and finally, after a nail-biting Power Stage and at his 106th WRC start, Dani Sordo won a WRC round.

Since the 2014 season, Sordo moved to the new Hyundai Motorsport team and drives the second or third car in selected events.

In 2019, Sordo achieved the second victory of his career at Rally Italia Sardegna. Sordo, was second for most of the rally behind Ott Tänak, but the Estonian suffered a power steering failure at the power stage, giving victory to Dani.

A year later, Sordo won the 2020 Rally Italia Sardegna, his second victory in a row at the event. He is the only driver alongside Sébastien Loeb, Sébastien Ogier and Thierry Neuville, to win the Italian Rally on multiple times. In the next race in Rally Monza, after leading the overall virtually, finally finished third, helping Hyundai win the constructors' championship.

In October 2021, Sordo renewed his contract through the 2022 season with Hyundai. After the renewal, he announced that 2022 would be his last season. At 2021 Rally Catalunya, after winning four stages in a row (SS15, SS16, SS17 and power stage), he finished third in the rally, achieving his 50th podium in the WRC.

== Other ventures ==
Sordo lent his voice for Dale Earnhardt Jr. in the European Spanish dub of the 2006 Pixar animated film Cars.

== WRC victories ==
#	Event	Season	Co-driver	Car
1	(Germany) 31. ADAC Rallye Deutschland	2013	Carlos del Barrio	Citroën DS3 WRC
2	(Italy) 16° Rally Italia Sardegna	2019	Carlos del Barrio	Hyundai i20 Coupe WRC
3	(Italy) 17º Rally Italia Sardegna	2020	Carlos del Barrio	Hyundai i20 Coupe WRC

== Career results ==
=== Complete WRC results ===
Year	Entrant	Car	1	2	3	4	5	6	7	8	9	10	11	12	13	14	15	16	WDC	Points
2003	Dani Sordo	Mitsubishi Lancer Evo VII	MON	SWE	TUR	NZL	ARG	GRC	CYP	GER	FIN	AUS	ITA	FRA	ESP; 18	GBR			NC	0
2004	Dani Sordo	Mitsubishi Lancer Evo VII	MON	SWE	MEX	NZL	CYP	GRE	TUR	ARG; Ret	FIN	GER; 19	JPN	GBR	ITA	FRA; 13			NC	0
2004	Dani Sordo	Citroën C2 S1600															ESP; 20	AUS	NC	0
2005	Dani Sordo	Citroën C2 S1600	MON; 15	SWE	MEX	NZL	ITA; 17	CYP	TUR	GRE; Ret	ARG	FIN; 15	GER; 13	GBR	JPN	FRA; 15	ESP; 12	AUS	NC	0
2006	Kronos Total Citroën WRT	Citroën Xsara WRC	MON; 8	SWE; 16	MEX; 4	ESP; 2	FRA; 3	ARG; 5	ITA; 3	GRE; 6	GER; 2	FIN; Ret	JPN; DSQ	CYP; Ret	TUR; 7	AUS; 23	NZL; 5	GBR; 7	5th	49
2007	Citroën Total WRT	Citroën C4 WRC	MON; 2	SWE; 12	NOR; 25	MEX; 4	POR; 3	ARG; 6	ITA; 3	GRE; 24	FIN; Ret	GER; Ret	NZL; 6	ESP; 2	FRA; 3	JPN; 2	IRE; 2	GBR; 5	4th	65
2008	Citroën Total WRT	Citroën C4 WRC	MON; 11	SWE; 6	MEX; 16	ARG; 3	JOR; 2	ITA; 5	GRE; 5	TUR; 4	FIN; 4	GER; 2	NZL; 2	ESP; 2	FRA; Ret	JPN; DSQ	GBR; 3		3rd	65
2009	Citroën Total WRT	Citroën C4 WRC	IRE; 2	NOR; 5	CYP; 4	POR; 3	ARG; 2	ITA; 22	GRE; 11	POL; 2	FIN; 4	AUS; 3	ESP; 2	GBR; 3					3rd	64
2010	Citroën Total WRT	Citroën C4 WRC	SWE; 4	MEX; 14	JOR; 4	TUR; Ret	NZL; 5	POR; 3	BUL; 2		GER; 2		FRA; 2	ESP; 3					5th	150
2010	Citroën Junior Team	Citroën C4 WRC								FIN; 5		JPN; 4			GBR; 5				5th	150
2011	Mini WRC Team	Mini John Cooper Works WRC	SWE	MEX	POR	JOR	ITA; 6	ARG	GRE	FIN; Ret	GER; 3	AUS	FRA; 2	ESP; 4	GBR; 20				8th	59
2012	Mini WRC Team	Mini John Cooper Works WRC	MON; 2	SWE; Ret	MEX														11th	35
2012	Prodrive WRC Team	Mini John Cooper Works WRC				POR; 11		GRE	NZL; 6	FIN	GER; 9	GBR	FRA; Ret	ITA	ESP; 9				11th	35
2012	Ford World Rally Team	Ford Fiesta RS WRC					ARG; Ret												11th	35
2013	Abu Dhabi Citroën Total WRT	Citroën DS3 WRC	MON; 3	SWE; Ret			ARG; 9						FRA; 2						5th	123
2013	Citroën Total Abu Dhabi WRT	Citroën DS3 WRC			MEX; 4	POR; 12		GRE; 2	ITA; 4	FIN; 5	GER; 1	AUS		ESP; Ret	GBR; 7				5th	123
2014	Hyundai Shell World Rally Team	Hyundai i20 WRC	MON; Ret	SWE	MEX	POR; Ret	ARG; Ret	ITA	POL	FIN	GER; 2	AUS	FRA; 4	ESP; 5	GBR				10th	40
2015	Hyundai Motorsport	Hyundai i20 WRC	MON; 6	SWE; WD	MEX; 5	ARG; 5	POR; 6	ITA; 20	POL; 10	FIN; 11	GER; 4		FRA; 7	ESP; 3	GBR; 4				8th	89
2015	Hyundai Motorsport N	Hyundai i20 WRC										AUS; 8							8th	89
2016	Hyundai Motorsport	Hyundai i20 WRC	MON; 6		MEX; 4	ARG; 4	POR; 4	ITA; 4			GER; 2	CHN; C	FRA; 7	ESP; 2	GBR; 6				5th	130
2016	Hyundai Motorsport N	Hyundai i20 WRC		SWE; 6					POL; Ret	FIN; WD						AUS; 5			5th	130
2017	Hyundai Motorsport	Hyundai i20 Coupe WRC	MON; 4	SWE; 4	MEX; 8	FRA; 3	ARG; 8	POR; 3	ITA; 12	POL; 4	FIN; 9	GER; 34	ESP; 15	GBR; 10	AUS				6th	95
2018	Hyundai Shell Mobis WRT	Hyundai i20 Coupe WRC	MON; Ret	SWE	MEX; 2	FRA; 4	ARG; 3	POR; 4	ITA	FIN	GER; Ret	TUR	GBR	ESP; 5	AUS				9th	71
2019	Hyundai Shell Mobis WRT	Hyundai i20 Coupe WRC	MON	SWE	MEX; 9	FRA; 4	ARG; 6	CHL	POR; 23	ITA; 1	FIN	GER; 5	TUR; 5	GBR	ESP; 3	AUS; C			8th	89
2020	Hyundai Shell Mobis WRT	Hyundai i20 Coupe WRC	MON	SWE	MEX; Ret	EST	TUR	ITA; 1	MNZ; 3										8th	42
2021	Hyundai Shell Mobis WRT	Hyundai i20 Coupe WRC	MON; 5	ARC	CRO	POR; 2	ITA; 17	KEN; 12	EST	BEL	GRE; 4	FIN	ESP; 3	MNZ; 3					6th	81
2022	Hyundai Shell Mobis WRT	Hyundai i20 N Rally1	MON	SWE	CRO	POR; 3	ITA; 3	KEN	EST	FIN	BEL	GRE; 3	NZL	ESP; 5	JPN; Ret				8th	59
2023	Hyundai Shell Mobis WRT	Hyundai i20 N Rally1	MON; 7	SWE	MEX; 5	CRO	POR; 2	ITA; Ret	KEN; 5	EST	FIN	GRE; 3	CHL	EUR	JPN; Ret				8th	63
2024	Hyundai Shell Mobis WRT	Hyundai i20 N Rally1	MON	SWE	KEN	CRO	POR; 5	ITA; 3	POL	LAT	FIN	GRE; 2	CHL	EUR	JPN				9th	44
2025	Team Hyundai Portugal	Hyundai i20 N Rally2	MON	SWE	KEN	ESP	POR; Ret	ITA	GRE	EST	FIN	PAR	CHL	EUR	JPN	SAU			NC	0
2026	Hyundai Shell Mobis WRT	Hyundai i20 N Rally1	MON	SWE	KEN	CRO	ESP; 7	POR; 8	JPN	GRE; Ret	EST	FIN	PAR	CHL	ITA; Ret	SAU; C			18th	10

* Season still in progress.

=== JWRC results ===
Year	Entrant	Car	1	2	3	4	5	6	7	8	Pos.	Points
2005	Dani Sordo	Citroën C2 S1600	MON; 4	MEX	ITA; 1	GRE; Ret	FIN; 1	GER; 1	FRA; 2	ESP; 1	1st	53

=== IRC results ===
Year	Entrant	Car	1	2	3	4	5	6	7	8	9	10	11	12	13	WDC	Points
2012	Dani Sordo	Mini Cooper S2000 1.6T	AZO	CAN	IRL	COR; 1	MEC	YPR	SMR	ROM	ZLI	YAL	SLI	SAN	CYP	15th	25

=== ERC results ===
Year	Entrant	Car	1	2	3	4	5	6	7	8	WDC	Points
2018	Hyundai Motorsport	Hyundai i20 R5	AZO	CAN	ACR	CYP	RMC	CZE; 3	POL	LIE	16th	24
2021	Team MRF Tyres	Hyundai i20 R5	POL	LAT	ITA	CZE	PRT1; 2	PRT2; 12	HUN	ESP	12th	40

== Footnotes ==
Sporting positions
Preceded by Per-Gunnar Andersson	Junior World Rally Champion; 2005	Succeeded by Patrik Sandell
