= Michel Nandan =

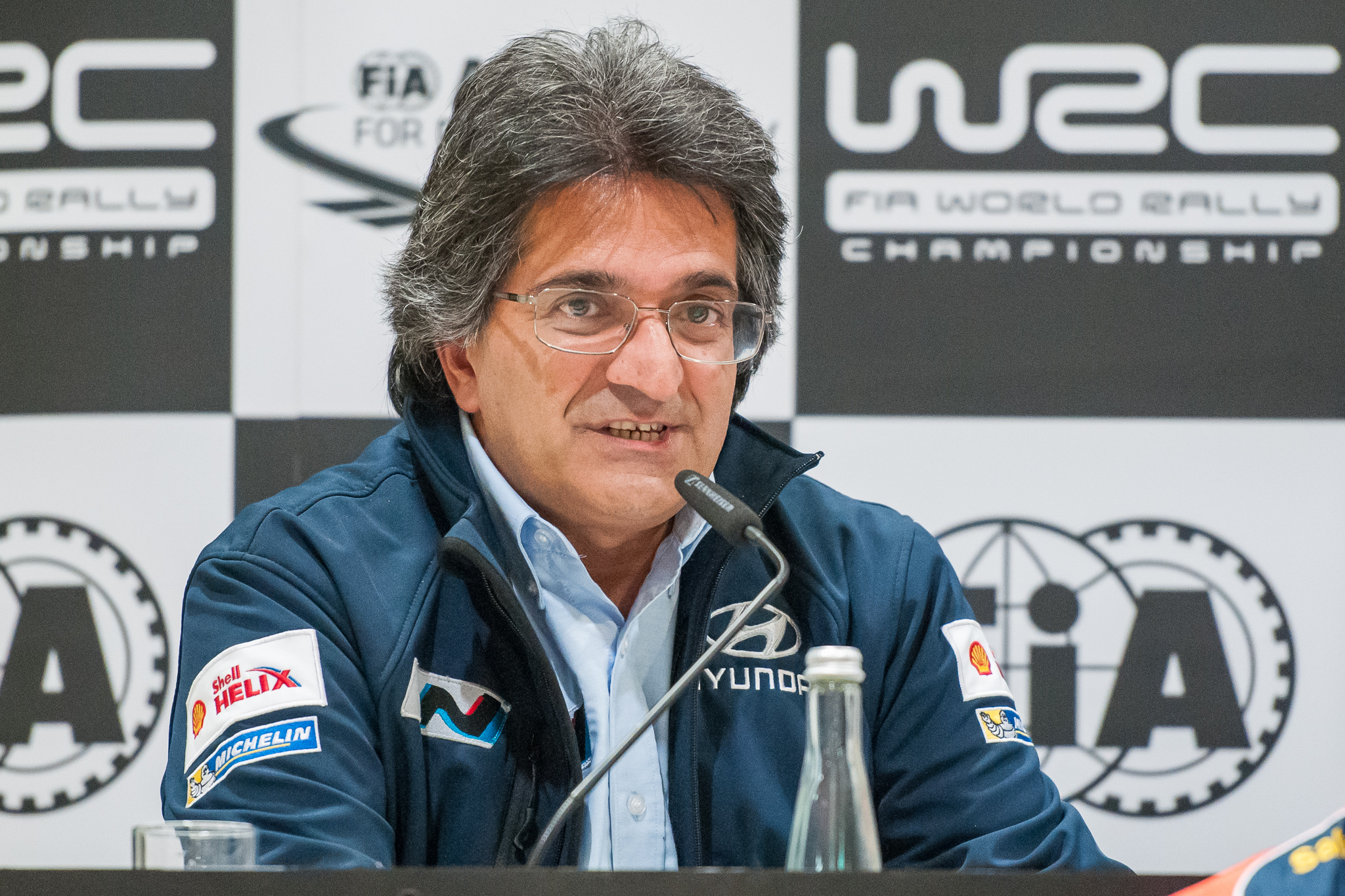
Michel Nandan, Rally Germany 2014.

Michel Nandan (born 5 April 1958) is a Monaco-based motor sport executive. His first major assignment as an engineer was in 1987 as a test and development engineer for Peugeot Sports Italy.

The Monaco born Nandan was appointed Team Principal of Hyundai Motorsport GmbH in January 2013. Before joining Hyundai, he was employed by the Fédération Française du Sport Automobile (French Motorsports Federation) as their technical/regulation representative. He had experience of working in three WRC teams: Toyota, Peugeot and Suzuki. Nandan's role in team principal ended in January 2019.

Nandan's sole experience as a driver was when he competed at the 1983 Rally Alpin-Behra in France.
