= Hyundai Motorsport =

South Korean company based in Germany

Hyundai Motorsport GmbH
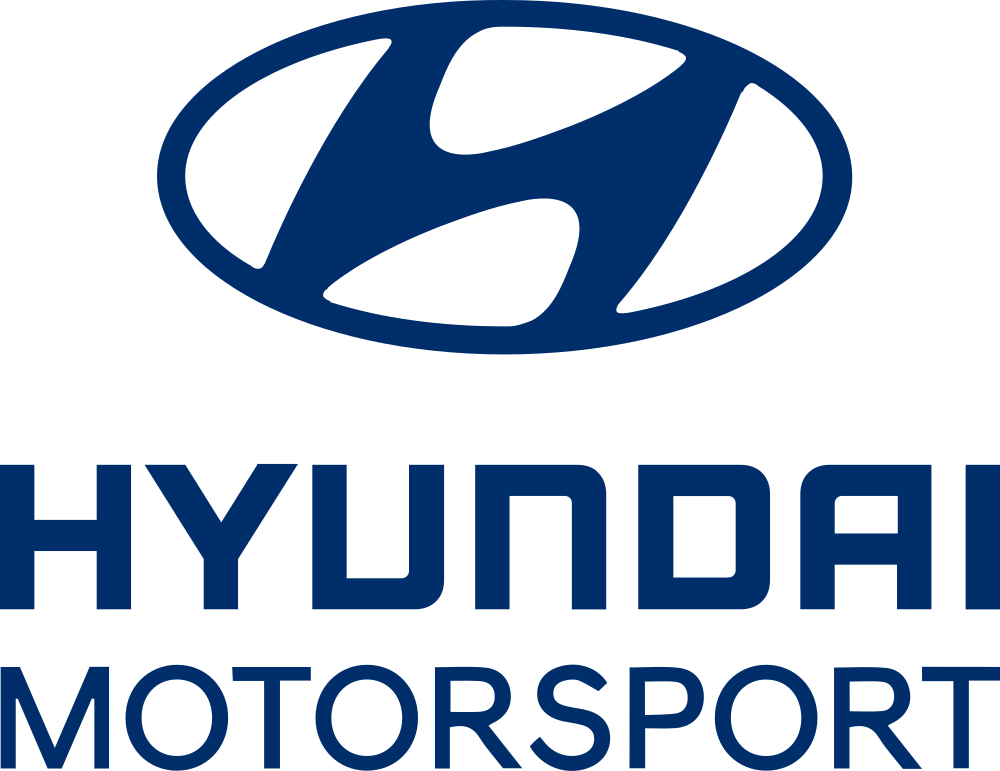
- Type: GmbH
- Industry: Motorsport
- Founded: 2012
- Headquarters: Alzenau, Germany,
- Key people: Cyril Abiteboul, President
- Website: motorsport.hyundai.com

Hyundai Motorsport GmbH (HMSG; Korean: 현대 모터스포츠) is a division of South Korean automaker Hyundai Motor Company responsible for the brand's global motorsport activities. The company was established in December 2012 and is based in Alzenau, Germany.

Their principal activity is running the Hyundai World Rally Team in the World Rally Championship (WRC). In 2015, its customer racing division was established to provide competition machinery and services in the R5 rallying and TCR touring car motorsport categories. In 2024, the company announced its intention to enter the FIA World Endurance Championship (WEC) through the LMDh program using the Genesis brand.

== History ==
A predecessor based in Korea, Hyundai Motor Sport, existed at least between 1998 and 2003. This was the department of Hyundai that contracted Motor Sport Developments to run campaigns in the 2-Litre Cup of the World Rally Championship with the Hyundai Coupe F2, and in the WRC Manufacturer's championship with the Hyundai Accent WRC. In September 2003, after a season hampered by budget constraints, Hyundai withdrew from the WRC, severing the partnership with MSD whilst vowing to return with an in-house operation based in Germany for 2006.

Nine years later at the 2012 Paris Motor Show, Hyundai announced it would be returning to the WRC in 2014 using the i20 model built to World Rally Car specifications. As promised, on 19 December 2012 an in-house operation, Hyundai Motorsport GmbH, was established in Alzenau, Germany, responsible for the programme.

In December 2015, the Customer Racing department was established to provide rally and touring cars and services to private customers. Its first project was an R5 specification car based on the Hyundai i20 model which debuted in September 2016 at the Tour de Corse with three entries. The department has grown to provide touring cars for use in global and national competition.

== Hyundai World Rally Team ==
HMSG developed the Hyundai i20 WRC for use in the WRC from 2014. An evolution, the i20 NG (Next Generation) was run in 2016 before being replaced in 2017 with the Hyundai i20 Coupe WRC due to new regulations. In 2022, with another new set of regulations, the hybrid i20 N Rally1 was launched after a delayed and interrupted development, caused by internal turmoil and the departure of the team principal Andrea Adamo.

Juho Hänninen, Bryan Bouffier and Chris Atkinson served as development test drivers in 2013. Thierry Neuville was named lead driver for the debut World Rally Championship season, and he has remained with the team ever since the Monte-Carlo Rally in January 2014. He and Hyundai also took the team's first victory at that year's Rallye Deutschland. Dani Sordo is also a long-time team servant though has not contested as many rallies. Other drivers have included Hayden Paddon, Kevin Abbring, Andreas Mikkelsen, Sébastien Loeb, Craig Breen, Ott Tänak, Oliver Solberg, Esapekka Lappi and Adrien Fourmaux.

Hyundai Motorsport won the 2019 Manufacturer's championship title, and repeated the feat in 2020.

=== WRC2 ===
Hyundai's 2023 WRC2 campaign is being run by French racing company, 2C Compétition using Hyundai i20 N Rally2 cars. In 2022, Estonian based RedGrey Team (former MM Motorsport) were contracted to enter WRC2 on Hyundai's behalf. Whilst 2C Compétition and RedGrey could be considered Rally2 car customers of HMSG, in return Hyundai are considered customers of their operational services. RedGrey is also part-owned by Ott Tänak, who in 2022 was a contracted Hyundai World Rally Team driver.

== Customer Racing ==
=== Rally ===
==== Hyundai i20 Coupe WRC ====
Pierre-Louis Loubet, Ole Cristian Veiby, Oliver Solberg, Nils Solans and Ken Block have all driven the World Rally Car on behalf of independent team, 2C Compétition.

==== Hyundai i20 R5 ====
Hyundai Motorsport developed the i20 R5 car in 2016 for use in various national and regional championships such as World Rally Championship-2, European Rally Championship and Tour European Rally.

The car was first tested in January 2016 and made its competitive debut in the WRC2 class at Tour de Corse.

The i20 R5 quickly made a name for itself, taking wins and championships in local and regional championships around the world.

==== Hyundai i20 N Rally2 ====
The Hyundai i20 N Rally2 is a rally car developed and built by Hyundai Motorsport to Group Rally2 specifications. It is the successor to Hyundai i20 R5.

The car was debuted at the 2021 Ypres Rally.

=== TCR ===
==== Hyundai i30 N TCR ====
In early 2017 Hyundai Motorsport announced it was developing an i30 N touring car based on TCR regulation. The car made its debut in the Touring Car Endurance Series 24h of Misano before being made available to customers by the end of the year.

For the 2018 World Touring Car Cup(WTCR), two teams entered the Hyundai i30 N TCR: YMR with Yvan Muller and Thed Björk, and BRC Racing Team with Gabriele Tarquini and Norbert Michelisz. Tarquini clinched the inaugural WTCR Driver's Championship, and YMR secured the Teams' Championship.

BRC Racing Team entered four i30 N TCR cars in to the 2019 World Touring Car Cup season. Reigning drivers’ champion Tarquini and teammate Michelisz returned to compete with BRC Hyundai N Squadra Corse team. Newcomers to WTCR Augusto Farfus and Nicky Catsburg signed to BRC Hyundai N LUKOIL Racing Team for the season.

The i30 N TCR won the USAC Pirelli World Challenge TCR class in 2018 with Bryan Herta Autosport in owner and manufacturer championships.

==== Veloster N TCR ====
Hyundai added the Hyundai Veloster, a car sold in some markets where the i30 is not sold, as a TCR option in 2019. The Veloster N competed in the 2019 Michelin Pilot Challenge and the 2019 24 Hours Nürburgring under the Hyundai Motorsport N marque alongside a Hyundai i30 N TCR. Both cars finished on the podium of the TCR class.

An electrical version of the car – Veloster ETCR, was unveiled in 2020 to compete in the Pure ETCR championship starting from 2021.

==== Elantra N TCR ====
In 2020 a third car, based on the TCR regulations, was unveiled by Hyundai Motorsport Customer Racing based on the Hyundai Elantra saloon model. The car made its competitive debut at the 2021 Michelin Pilot Challenge season opener at the Daytona International Speedway.

== FIA World Endurance Championship ==
On 12 September 2024, Hyundai Motorsport announced that it will enter the FIA World Endurance Championship (WEC). Building a car to the LMDh regulations, Hyundai will use the Genesis brand and Hyundai Motorsport will run the car under the title Genesis Magma Racing.

== Gallery ==
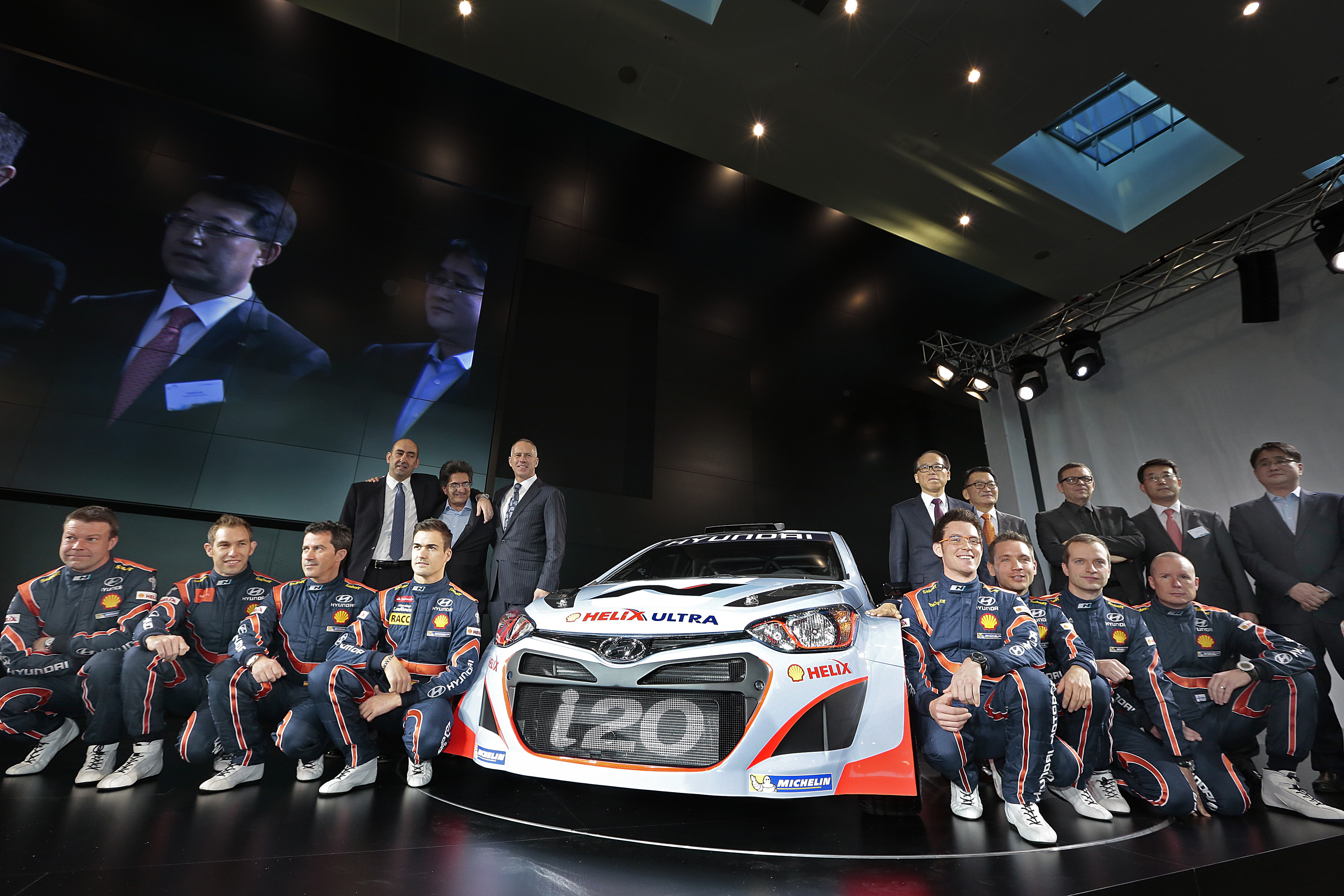
2013

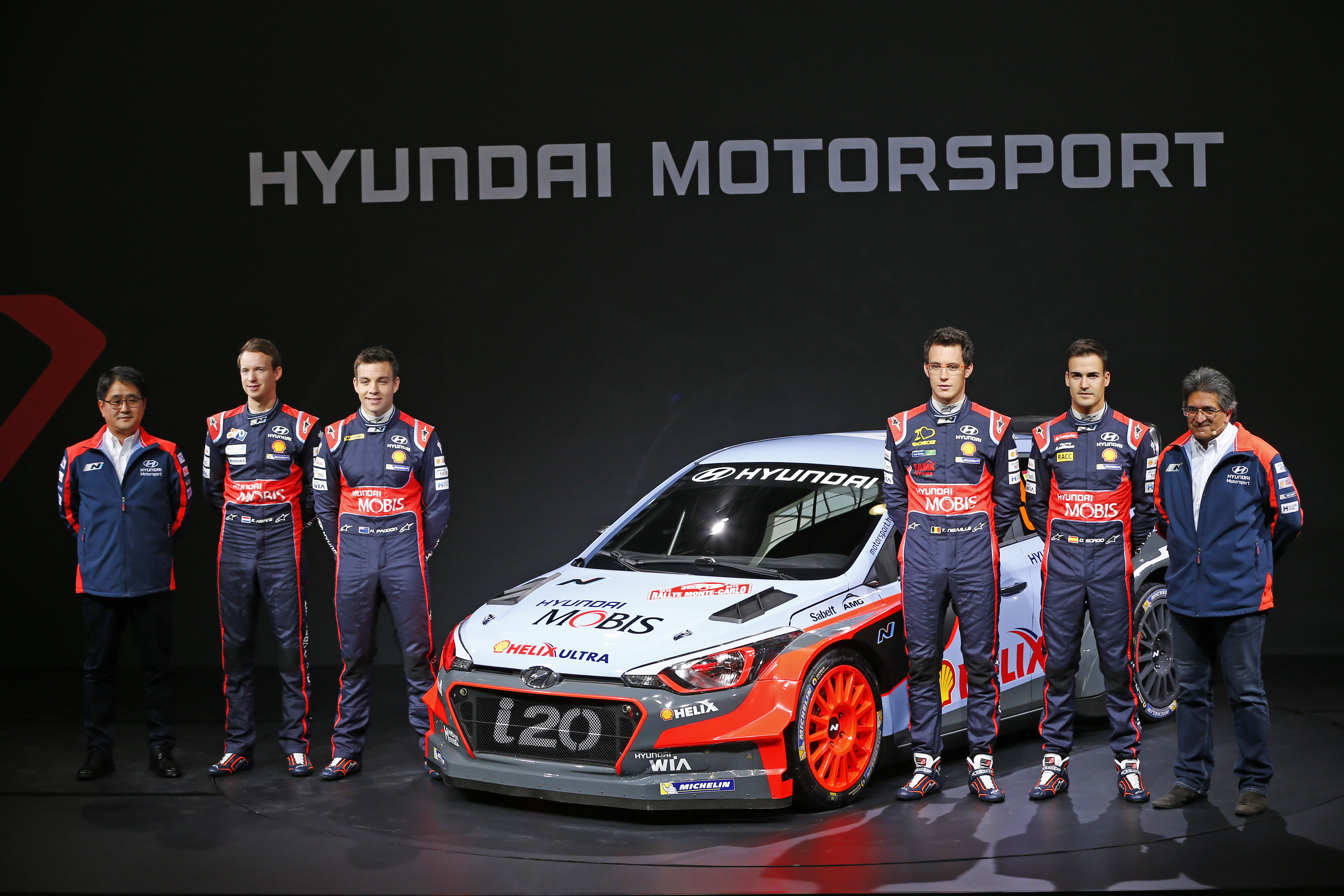
2016

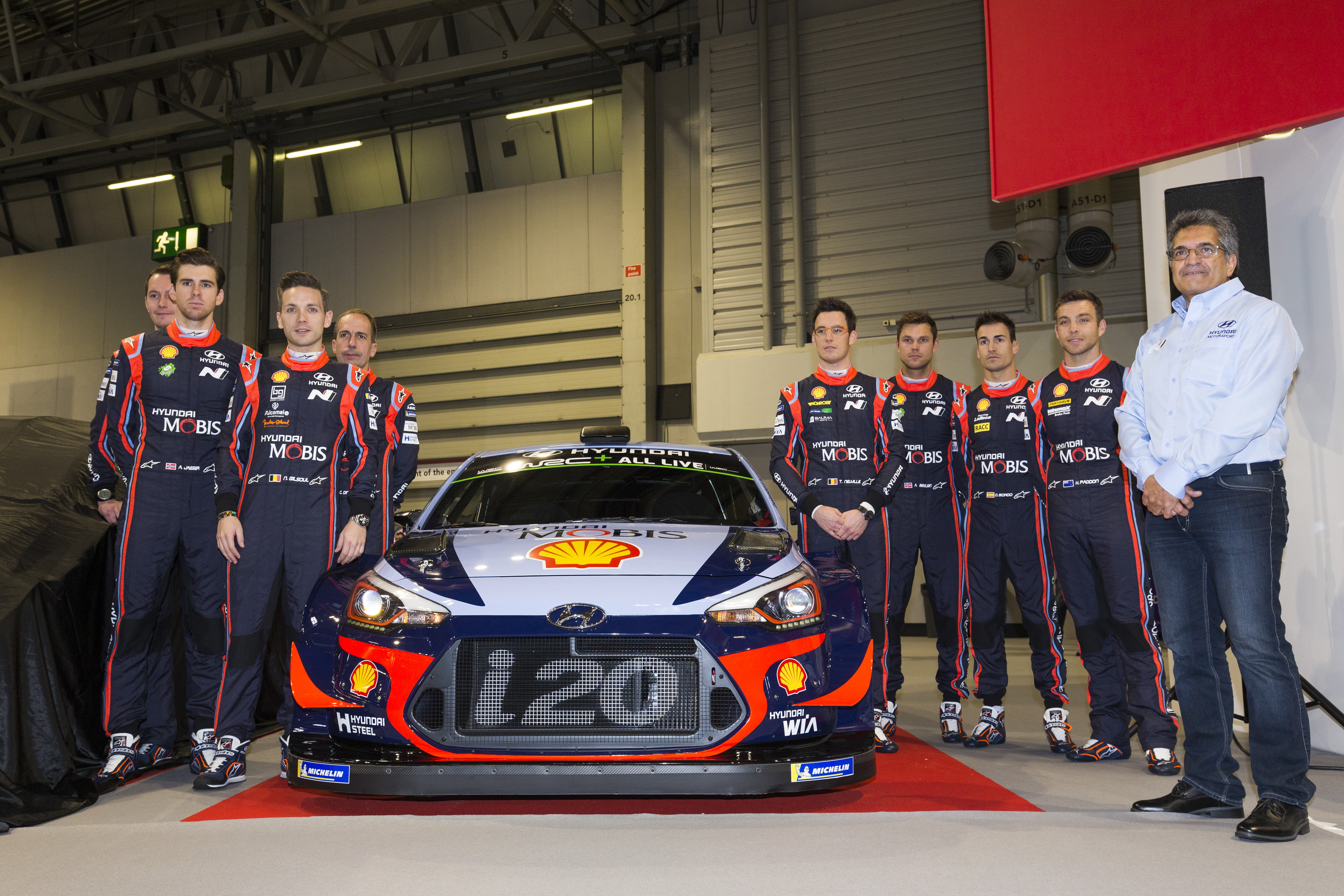
2018

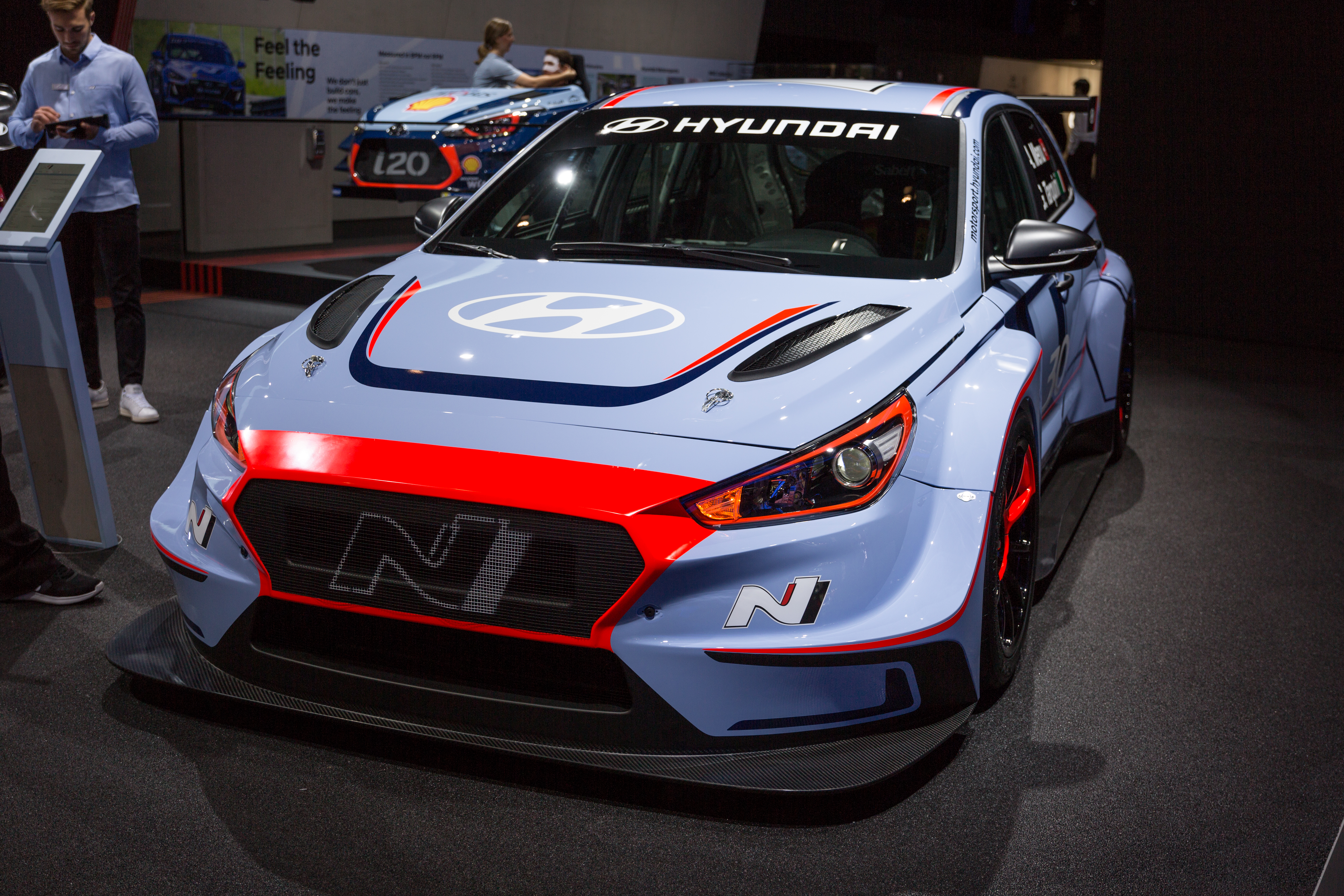
Hyundai i30 N TCR, IAA 2017, Frankfurt

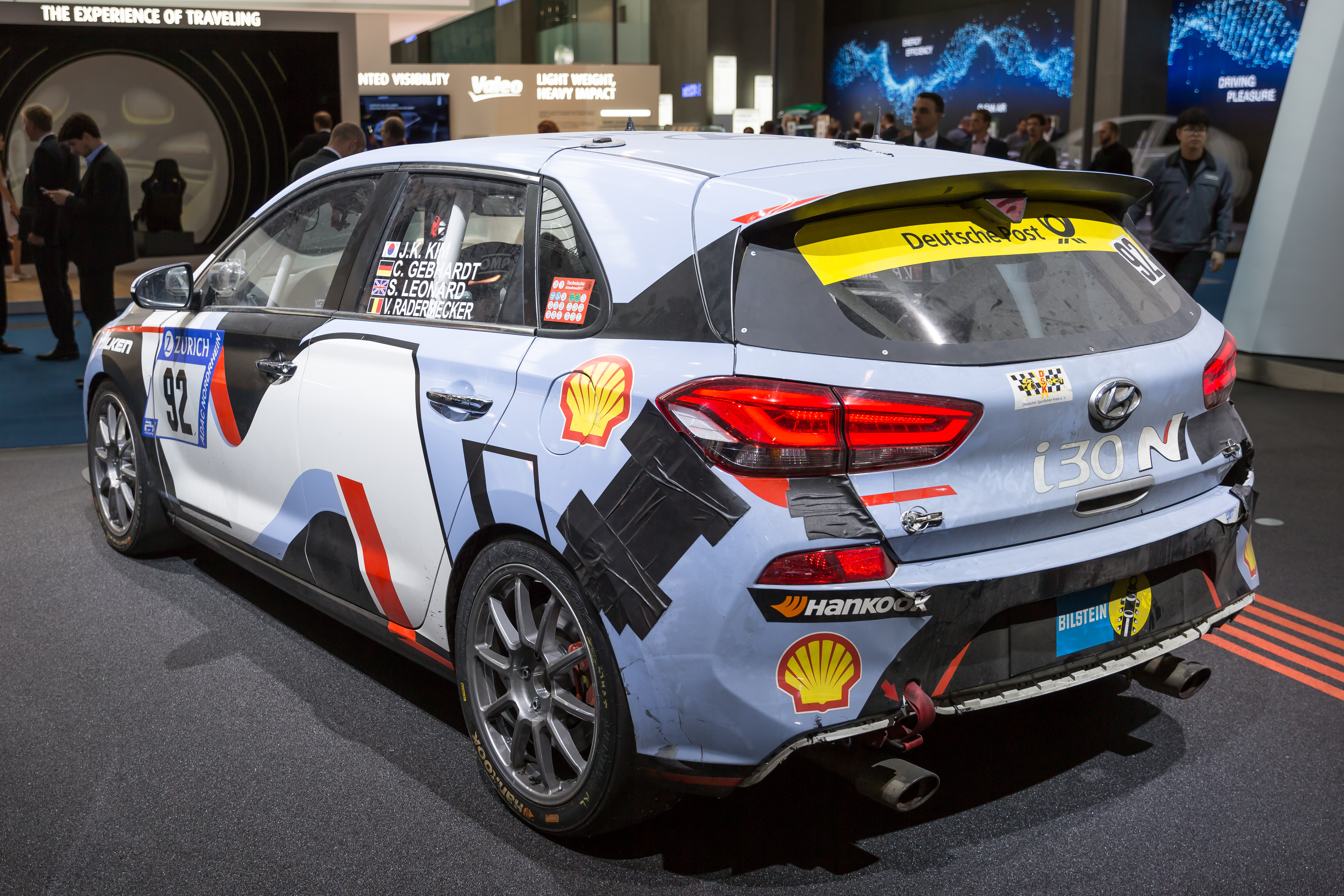
Hyundai i30 N of Hyundai Motorsport after the 24h Nürburgring

== Cars ==
| Year | Car | Image | Category |
|---|---|---|---|
| 2014 | Hyundai i20 WRC | | WRC |
| 2016 | Hyundai i20 R5 | | Group R5 |
| 2017 | Hyundai i20 Coupe WRC | | WRC |
| 2017 | Hyundai i30 N TCR | | TCR |
| 2019 | Hyundai Veloster N ETCR | | ETCR |
| 2020 | Hyundai i30 Fastback N Performance | | NGTC |
| 2020 | Veloster N TCR | | TCR |
| 2021 | Hyundai Elantra N TCR | | TCR |
| 2021 | Hyundai i20 N Rally2 | | Group Rally2 |
| 2022 | Hyundai i20 N Rally1 | | Group Rally1 |
| 2024 | Hyundai Elantra N TCR | | TCR |
