= 2014 WRC3 Championship =

The 2014 FIA WRC3 Championship was the second season of WRC3, a rallying championship organised and governed by the Fédération Internationale de l'Automobile, running in support of the World Rally Championship. It was created when the Group R class of rally car was introduced in 2013.

Sébastien Chardonnet started as the defending champion. However, he did not defend his title as he competed in the WRC2 championship instead.

The championship was won by Stéphane Lefebvre. Alastair Fisher finished the championship second with Martin Koči third.

== Calendar ==
Unlike its predecessor the Production Car World Rally Championship, WRC3 did not have a fixed calendar. Instead, teams and drivers competing in the series were free to contest any of thirteen rallies that formed the 2014 World Rally Championship. They had to nominate up to six events to score points in, and their best five results from these six events counted towards their final championship points score. The World Rally Championship was open to two-wheel drive cars complying with R1, R2 and R3 regulations. The 2014 calendar was announced at a meeting of the FIA World Motor Sport Council in Croatia on 27 September 2013. The 2014 championship was contested over thirteen rounds in Europe, the Americas and Oceania.

Round	Dates	Rally name	Rally headquarters	Surface
1	16–18 January	(Monaco) Monte Carlo Rally	Gap, Hautes-Alpes, France	Mixed
2	5–8 February	Rally Sweden	Hagfors, Värmland	Snow
3	6–9 March	Rally Mexico	León, Guanajuato	Gravel
4	3–6 April	Rally de Portugal	Faro, Algarve	Gravel
5	8–11 May	Rally Argentina	Villa Carlos Paz, Córdoba	Gravel
6	6–8 June	(Italy) Rally Italia Sardegna	Alghero, Sardinia	Gravel
7	27–29 June	Rally Poland	Mikołajki, Warmia-Masuria	Gravel
8	31 July–3 August	Rally Finland	Jyväskylä, Keski-Suomi	Gravel
9	22–24 August	(Germany) Rallye Deutschland	Trier, Rhineland-Palatinate	Tarmac
10	12–14 September	Rally Australia	Coffs Harbour, New South Wales	Gravel
11	3–5 October	Rallye de France Alsace	Strasbourg, Alsace	Tarmac
12	24–26 October	(Spain) Rally de Catalunya	Salou, Tarragona	Mixed
13	14–16 November	(United Kingdom) Wales Rally GB	Deeside, Flintshire	Gravel

=== Calendar changes ===
- Rally Australia and Rally New Zealand abandoned the event-sharing arrangement established in 2008 that saw each event host a round of the championship every other year. After hosting an event in 2013, Rally Australia remains on the calendar throughout 2014 and 2015 before the arrangement is due to be renegotiated.
- The Rallye Monte Carlo relocated its base from Valence in the French province of Rhône-Alpes to the town of Gap in the neighbouring province of Hautes-Alpes.
- The 2014 calendar saw the Rally of Poland return to the championship for the first time since 2009. The event also crossed the border into Lithuania for one day of competition. Its inclusion came at the expense of the Acropolis Rally, which was removed after struggling with its financial obligations to the championship. The Acropolis Rally later moved to the European Rally Championship for the 2014 season. The rallies of Brazil and China had also been considered for inclusion on the WRC calendar before the FIA approved of the Rally of Poland.

== Teams and drivers ==
Constructor	Entrant	Driver	Co-driver	Tyre	Class	Rounds
Citroën (Citroën DS3 R3T)	(France) Quentin Gilbert	(France) Quentin Gilbert	(Belgium) Renaud Jamoul	MI	R3	1
Citroën (Citroën DS3 R3T)	(Italy) Simone Tempestini	(Italy) Simone Tempestini	(Romania) Dorin Pulpea	MI	R3	4, 7–9, 11
Citroën (Citroën DS3 R3T)	(Italy) Simone Tempestini	(Italy) Simone Tempestini	(Italy) Matteo Chiarcossi	MI	R3	13
Citroën (Citroën DS3 R3T)	(Poland) Aron Domżała	(Poland) Aron Domżała	(Poland) Przemysław Zawada	MI	R3	4, 7–8
Citroën (Citroën DS3 R3T)	(Poland) Aron Domżała	(Poland) Aron Domżała	(Poland) Szymon Gospodarczyk	MI	R3	11
Citroën (Citroën DS3 R3T)	(Poland) Aron Domżała	(Poland) Aron Domżała	(Poland) Kamil Heller	MI	R3	13
Citroën (Citroën DS3 R3T)	(Germany) ADAC Team Weser-Ems e.V.	(Germany) Christian Riedemann	(Belgium) Lara Vanneste	MI	R3	4, 7, 11
Citroën (Citroën DS3 R3T)	(Germany) ADAC Team Weser-Ems e.V.	(Germany) Christian Riedemann	(Belgium) Michael Wenzel	MI	R3	9
Citroën (Citroën DS3 R3T)	(France) Quentin Giordano	(France) Quentin Giordano	(France) Guillaume Duval	MI	R3	4, 7
Citroën (Citroën DS3 R3T)	(France) Quentin Giordano	(France) Quentin Giordano	(France) Valentin Sarreaud	MI	R3	8, 11, 13
Citroën (Citroën DS3 R3T)	(France) Quentin Giordano	(France) Quentin Giordano	(France) Thomas Roux	MI	R3	9
Citroën (Citroën DS3 R3T)	(Slovakia) Martin Koči	(Slovakia) Martin Koči	(Czech Republic) Lukáš Kostka	MI	R3	4
Citroën (Citroën DS3 R3T)	(Slovakia) Styllex Slovak National Team	(Slovakia) Martin Koči	(Czech Republic) Lukáš Kostka	MI	R3	7–9, 11, 13
Citroën (Citroën DS3 R3T)	(France) Stéphane Lefebvre	(France) Stéphane Lefebvre	(France) Thomas Dubois	MI	R3	4, 7–9
Citroën (Citroën DS3 R3T)	(Australia) Molly Taylor	(Australia) Molly Taylor	(Australia) Coral Taylor	MI	R3	4
Citroën (Citroën DS3 R3T)	(Australia) Molly Taylor	(Australia) Molly Taylor	(United Kingdom) Sebastian Marshall	MI	R3	7–8, 13
Citroën (Citroën DS3 R3T)	(Austria) Team Jaga Motorsport	(Cyprus) Panikos Polykarpou	(Austria) Gerald Winter	MI	R3	4, 7
Citroën (Citroën DS3 R3T)	(France) Sylvain Michel	(France) Sylvain Michel	(France) Gwenola Marie	MI	R3	4
Citroën (Citroën DS3 R3T)	(Switzerland) Frederico Della Casa	(Switzerland) Frederico Della Casa	(Italy) Domenico Pozzi	MI	R3	4, 7–9
Citroën (Citroën DS3 R3T)	(United Kingdom) Alastair Fisher	(United Kingdom) Alastair Fisher	(United Kingdom) Gordon Noble	MI	R3	4, 7–9, 11, 13
Citroën (Citroën DS3 R3T)	(Austria) Wurmbrand Racing Team	(Hungary) Kornél Lukács	(Hungary) Márk Mesterházi	MI	R3	4, 7–9, 11
Citroën (Citroën DS3 R3T)	(Czech Republic) Czech National Team	(Czech Republic) Jan Černý	(Czech Republic) Pavel Kohout	MI	R3	4
Citroën (Citroën DS3 R3T)	(Italy) Simone Campedelli	(Italy) Simone Campedelli	(Italy) Danilo Fappani	MI	R3	4
Citroën (Citroën DS3 R3T)	AKK Sports Team Finland	(Finland) Teemu Suninen	(Finland) Juha-Pekka Jauhiainen	DM	R3	8
Citroën (Citroën DS3 R3T)	(United Arab Emirates) Abu Dhabi Racing	(United Arab Emirates) Mohamed Al Mutawaa	(United Kingdom) Stephen McAuley	MI	R3	9, 12
Citroën (Citroën DS3 R3T)	(France) Eric Camilli	(France) Eric Camilli	(France) Maxime Vilmot	MI	R3	9
Citroën (Citroën DS3 R3T)	(France) Rallye Jeunes FFSA	(France) Eric Camilli	(France) Maxime Vilmot	MI	R3	11
Citroën (Citroën DS3 R3T)	(France) Rallye Jeunes FFSA	(France) Yohan Rossel	(France) Benoît Fulcrand	MI	R3	11
Citroën (Citroën DS3 R3T)	(France) Frédéric Hauswald	(France) Frédéric Hauswald	(France) Olivier Ural	MI	R3	11
Citroën (Citroën DS3 R3T)	(Finland) Hannu's Rally Team	(Finland) Henri Haapamäki	(Finland) Marko Salminen	MI	R3	13
Renault (Renault Clio R3T)	(France) Alain Pyrame	(France) Alain Pyrame	(France) Vincent Varetz	P	R3	11

Icon	Class
R1	Classification within Group R^{‡}
R2	Classification within Group R^{‡}
R3	Classification within Group R^{‡}

== Rally summaries ==
Round	Rally name	Podium finishers				Statistics			
Round	Rally name	Pos.	Driver	Team	Time	Stages	Length	Starters	Finishers
1	(Monaco) Monte Carlo Rally (15–20 January) — Results and report	1	(France) Quentin Gilbert (Belgium) Renaud Jamoul	(France) Quentin Gilbert (Citroën DS3 R3T)	5:18:33.8	(15)^{1a} 14	(383.88 km)^{1b} 360.48 km	1	1
1	(Monaco) Monte Carlo Rally (15–20 January) — Results and report	No further WRC3 entries.				(15)^{1a} 14	(383.88 km)^{1b} 360.48 km	1	1
2	Rally Sweden (5–8 February) — Results and report	No WRC3 entries.				(24); 23	(323.54 km); 312.22 km	—N/a	—N/a
3	Rally Mexico (6–9 March) — Results and report	No WRC3 entries.				21	401.77 km	—N/a	—N/a
4	Rally de Portugal (3–6 April) — Results and report	1	(France) Stéphane Lefebvre (France) Thomas Dubois	(France) Stéphane Lefebvre (Citroën DS3 R3T)	4:02:51.8	16	339.46 km	14	12
4	Rally de Portugal (3–6 April) — Results and report	2	(Germany) Christian Riedemann (Belgium) Lara Vanneste	(Germany) ADAC Team Weser-Ems e.V. (Citroën DS3 R3T)	4:03:54.5	16	339.46 km	14	12
4	Rally de Portugal (3–6 April) — Results and report	3	(Slovakia) Martin Koči (Czech Republic) Lukáš Kostka	(Slovakia) Martin Koči (Citroën DS3 R3T)	4:06:22.4	16	339.46 km	14	12
5	Rally Argentina (8–11 May) — Results and report	No WRC3 entries.				14	405.10 km	—N/a	—N/a
6	(Italy) Rally Italia Sardegna (6–8 June) — Results and report	No WRC3 entries.				17	364.54 km	—N/a	—N/a
7	Rally Poland (26–29 June) — Results and report	1	(France) Stéphane Lefebvre (France) Thomas Dubois	(France) Stéphane Lefebvre (Citroën DS3 R3T)	2:58:25.3	24	336.64 km	11	9
7	Rally Poland (26–29 June) — Results and report	2	(United Kingdom) Alastair Fisher (United Kingdom) Gordon Noble	(United Kingdom) Alastair Fisher (Citroën DS3 R3T)	3:00:38.6	24	336.64 km	11	9
7	Rally Poland (26–29 June) — Results and report	3	(France) Quentin Giordano (France) Guillaume Duval	(France) Quentin Giordano (Citroën DS3 R3T)	3:01:51.2	24	336.64 km	11	9
8	Rally Finland (1–3 August) — Results and report	1	(Finland) Teemu Suninen (Finland) Juha-Pekka Jauhiainen	AKK Sports Team Finland (Citroën DS3 R3T)	3:31:27.8	26	360.94 km	10	9
8	Rally Finland (1–3 August) — Results and report	2	(Slovakia) Martin Koči (Czech Republic) Lukáš Kostka	(Slovakia) Styllex Slovak National Team (Citroën DS3 R3T)	3:31:59.7	26	360.94 km	10	9
8	Rally Finland (1–3 August) — Results and report	3	(France) Quentin Giordano (France) Valentin Sarreaud	(France) Quentin Giordano (Citroën DS3 R3T)	3:33:19.8	26	360.94 km	10	9
9	(Germany) Rallye Deutschland (22–24 August) — Results and report	1	(France) Stéphane Lefebvre (France) Thomas Dubois	(France) Stéphane Lefebvre (Citroën DS3 R3T)	3:27:45.4	18	324.31 km	10	6
9	(Germany) Rallye Deutschland (22–24 August) — Results and report	2	(Germany) Christian Riedemann (Germany) Michael Wenzel	(Germany) ADAC Team Weser-Ems e.V. (Citroën DS3 R3T)	3:27:54.8	18	324.31 km	10	6
9	(Germany) Rallye Deutschland (22–24 August) — Results and report	3	(France) Quentin Giordano (France) Thomas Roux	(France) Quentin Giordano (Citroën DS3 R3T)	3:33:21.5	18	324.31 km	10	6
10	Rally Australia (12–14 September) — Results and report	No WRC3 entries.				20	319.58 km	—N/a	—N/a
11	Rallye de France Alsace (3–5 October) — Results and report	No results; all 7 finishers excluded for technical irregularities.				18	303.63 km	11	7
12	(Spain) Rally Catalunya (24–26 October) — Results and report	1	(United Arab Emirates) Mohamed Al Mutawaa (United Kingdom) Stephen McAuley	(United Arab Emirates) Abu Dhabi Racing (Citroën DS3 R3T)	4:51:22.6	17	372.96 km	1	1
12	(Spain) Rally Catalunya (24–26 October) — Results and report		(France) Alain Pyrame (France) Vincent Varetz	(France) Alain Pyrame (Renault Clio R3T)	Withdrew	17	372.96 km	1	1
12	(Spain) Rally Catalunya (24–26 October) — Results and report	No further WRC3 entries.				17	372.96 km	1	1
13	(United Kingdom) Wales Rally GB (14–16 November) — Results and report	1	(United Kingdom) Alastair Fisher (United Kingdom) Gordon Noble	(United Kingdom) Alastair Fisher (Citroën DS3 R3T)	3:31:20.1	17	305.64 km	7	6
13	(United Kingdom) Wales Rally GB (14–16 November) — Results and report	2	(Slovakia) Martin Koči (Czech Republic) Lukáš Kostka	(Slovakia) Styllex Slovak National Team (Citroën DS3 R3T)	3:32:38.9	17	305.64 km	7	6
13	(United Kingdom) Wales Rally GB (14–16 November) — Results and report	3	(Finland) Henri Haapamäki (Finland) Marko Salminen	(Finland) Hannu's Rally Team (Citroën DS3 R3T)	3:34:14.6	17	305.64 km	7	6

Notes

- ^1 — The Monte Carlo Rally was shortened when a competitor stopped on Stage 14, blocking traffic and forcing organisers to abandon the stage.

== Standings ==
=== FIA WRC3 Championship for Drivers ===
Pos.	Driver	MON (Monaco)	SWE (Sweden)	MEX (Mexico)	POR (Portugal)	ARG (Argentina)	ITA (Italy)	POL (Poland)	FIN (Finland)	GER (Germany)	AUS (Australia)	FRA (France)	ESP (Spain)	GBR (United Kingdom)	Points
1	(France) Stéphane Lefebvre				1			1	8	1		EX			79
2	(United Kingdom) Alastair Fisher				Ret			2	5	4		EX		1	65
3	(Slovakia) Martin Koči				3			4	2	Ret		EX		2	63
4	(France) Quentin Giordano				10			3	3	3		EX		6	54
5	(Germany) Christian Riedemann				2			5	WD	2		WD			46
6	(Australia) Molly Taylor				8			8	4					4	32
7	(Italy) Simone Tempestini				6			Ret	6	5		Ret		Ret	26
8	(Finland) Teemu Suninen								1						25
9	(France) Quentin Gilbert	1													25
10	(United Arab Emirates) Mohamed Al-Mutawaa									Ret			1		25
11	(Poland) Aron Domżała				Ret			7	7			EX		5	22
12	(Switzerland) Federico della Casa				4			9	9	Ret					16
13	(Hungary) Kornél Lukács				12			6	Ret	6		Ret			16
14	(Finland) Henri Haapamäki													3	15
15	(Italy) Simone Campedelli				5			WD							10
16	(Czech Republic) Jan Černý				7										6
17	(Cyprus) Panikos Polykarpou				9			Ret							2
Pos.	Driver	MON (Monaco)	SWE (Sweden)	MEX (Mexico)	POR (Portugal)	ARG (Argentina)	ITA (Italy)	POL (Poland)	FIN (Finland)	GER (Germany)	AUS (Australia)	FRA (France)	ESP (Spain)	GBR (United Kingdom)	Points

Key
Colour	Result
Gold	Winner
Silver	2nd place
Bronze	3rd place
Green	Points finish
Blue	Non-points finish
Blue	Non-classified finish (NC)
Purple	Did not finish (Ret)
Black	Excluded (EX)
Black	Disqualified (DSQ)
White	Did not start (DNS)
White	Cancelled (C)
Blank	Withdrew entry from the event (WD)

=== FIA WRC3 Championship for Co-Drivers ===
Pos.	Co-driver	MON (Monaco)	SWE (Sweden)	MEX (Mexico)	POR (Portugal)	ARG (Argentina)	ITA (Italy)	POL (Poland)	FIN (Finland)	GER (Germany)	AUS (Australia)	FRA (France)	ESP (Spain)	GBR (United Kingdom)	Points
1	(France) Thomas Dubois				1			1	8	1		EX			79
2	(United Kingdom) Gordon Noble				Ret			2	5	4		EX		1	65
3	(Czech Republic) Lukáš Kostka				3			4	2	Ret		EX		2	63
4	(Belgium) Lara Vanneste				2			5	WD			WD			28
5	(United Kingdom) Sebastian Marshall							8	4					4	28
6	(Romania) Dorin Pulpea				6			Ret	6	5		Ret			26
7	(Finland) Juha-Pekka Jauhiainen								1						25
8	(Belgium) Renaud Jamoul	1													25
9	(United Kingdom) Stephen McAuley									Ret			1		25
10	(France) Valentin Sarreaud								3			EX		6	23
11	(Germany) Michael Wenzel									2					18
12	(France) Guillaume Duval				10			3							16
13	(Hungary) Márk Mesterházi				12			6	Ret	6		Ret			16
14	(Italy) Domenico Pozzi				4			9	9	Ret					16
15	(France) Thomas Roux									3					15
16	(Finland) Marko Salminen													3	15
17	(Poland) Przemek Zawada				Ret			7	7						12
18	(Italy) Danilo Fappani				5			WD							10
19	(Poland) Kamil Heller													5	10
20	(Czech Republic) Pavel Kohout				7										6
21	(Australia) Coral Taylor				8										4
22	(Austria) Gerald Winter				9			Ret							2
Pos.	Co-driver	MON (Monaco)	SWE (Sweden)	MEX (Mexico)	POR (Portugal)	ARG (Argentina)	ITA (Italy)	POL (Poland)	FIN (Finland)	GER (Germany)	AUS (Australia)	FRA (France)	ESP (Spain)	GBR (United Kingdom)	Points

Key
Colour	Result
Gold	Winner
Silver	2nd place
Bronze	3rd place
Green	Points finish
Blue	Non-points finish
Blue	Non-classified finish (NC)
Purple	Did not finish (Ret)
Black	Excluded (EX)
Black	Disqualified (DSQ)
White	Did not start (DNS)
White	Cancelled (C)
Blank	Withdrew entry from the event (WD)

=== FIA WRC3 Championship for Teams ===
Pos.	Team	MON (Monaco)	SWE (Sweden)	MEX (Mexico)	POR (Portugal)	ARG (Argentina)	ITA (Italy)	POL (Poland)	FIN (Finland)	GER (Germany)	AUS (Australia)	FRA (France)	ESP (Spain)	GBR (United Kingdom)	Points
1	(Germany) ADAC Team Weser-Ems e.V.				1			2	WD	1		WD			68
2	(Slovakia) Styllex Slovak National Team							1	2	Ret		EX		1	68
3	(Austria) Wurmbrand Racing Team				4			3	Ret	2		Ret			45
4	AKK Sports Team Finland								1						25
5	(United Arab Emirates) Abu Dhabi Racing									Ret			1		25
6	(Czech Republic) Czech National Team				2										18
7	(Finland) Hannu's Rally Team													2	18
8	(Austria) Team Jaga Motorsport				3			Ret							15
Pos.	Team	MON (Monaco)	SWE (Sweden)	MEX (Mexico)	POR (Portugal)	ARG (Argentina)	ITA (Italy)	POL (Poland)	FIN (Finland)	GER (Germany)	AUS (Australia)	FRA (France)	ESP (Spain)	GBR (United Kingdom)	Points

Key
Colour	Result
Gold	Winner
Silver	2nd place
Bronze	3rd place
Green	Points finish
Blue	Non-points finish
Blue	Non-classified finish (NC)
Purple	Did not finish (Ret)
Black	Excluded (EX)
Black	Disqualified (DSQ)
White	Did not start (DNS)
White	Cancelled (C)
Blank	Withdrew entry from the event (WD)

== Regulation changes ==
- All competitors registered in the Manufacturers', WRC2, WRC3 and Junior WRC championships were obliged to use a colour-coded windscreen sticker to distinguish its category.
- Drivers were no longer assigned permanent numbers, except upon request.
- All competitors registered for the Junior WRC were registered for scoring points in the WRC3 Championship.
