= 2014 Rally Poland =

Motor rally competition

2014 Rally Poland 71st Rally Poland
Round 7 of the 2014 World Rally Championship season
| ← Previous event | Next event → |
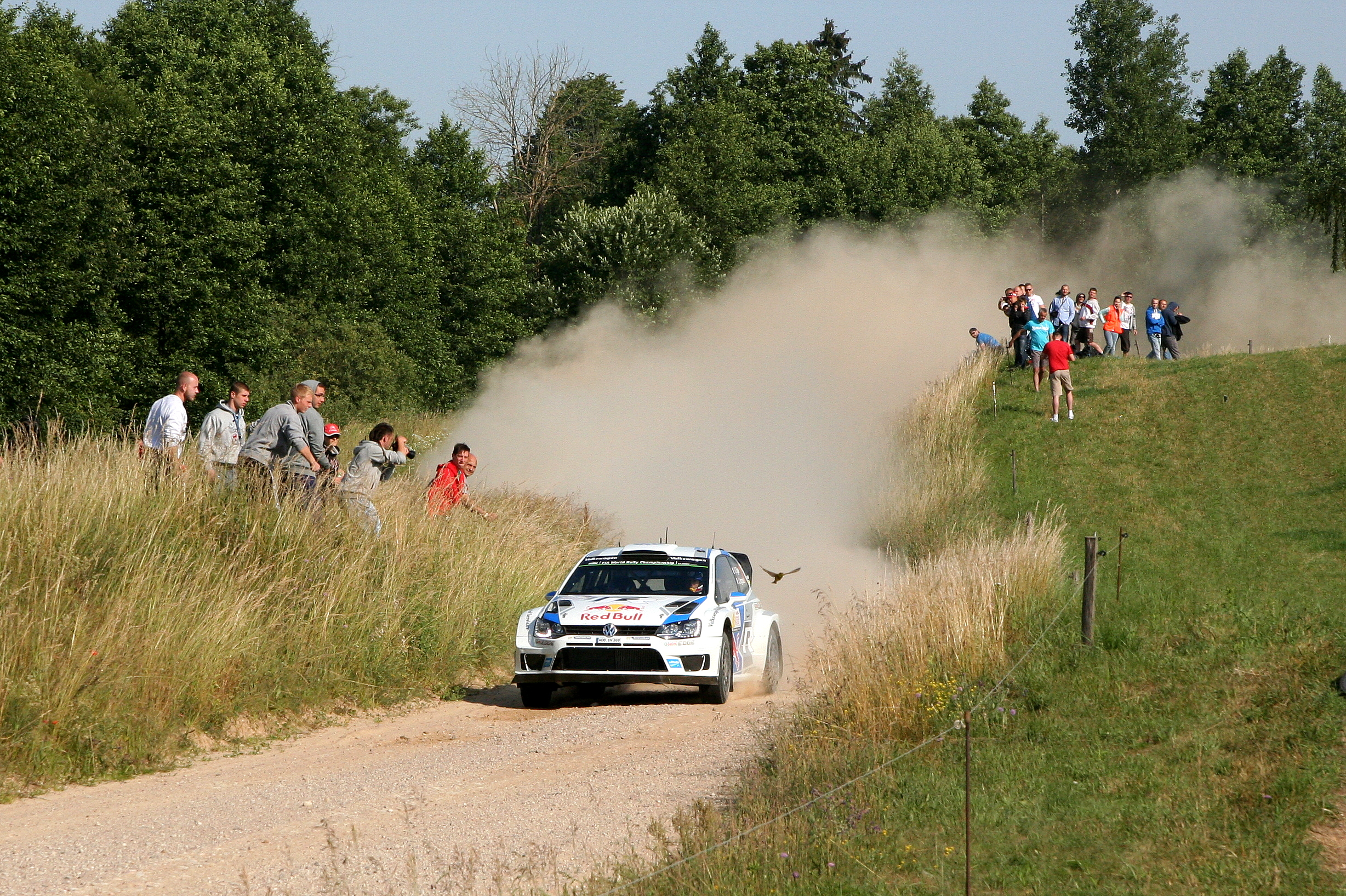
- Sébastien Ogier at 2014 Rally Poland
- Host country: Poland
- Rally base: Mikołajki, Warmian-Masurian
- Dates run: June 27 – June 29, 2014
- Stages: 24 (336.64 km; 209.18 miles)
- Stage surface: Gravel

Statistics
- Crews: 68 at start, 52 at finish

Overall results
- Overall winner: (France) Sébastien Ogier (France) Julien Ingrassia (Germany) Volkswagen Motorsport

The 2014 LOTOS Rally Poland was the seventh round of the 2014 World Rally Championship season. The event was based in Mikołajki, Poland, and started on 27 June and finished on 29 June after 24 special stages, totaling 336.6 competitive kilometres.

WRC Champion Sébastien Ogier won the Rally Poland for the first time in his career, taking his fifth victory of the 2014 season.

== Entry list ==
Notable entrants
| No. | Entrant | Class | Driver | Co-driver | Car | Tyre |
|---|---|---|---|---|---|---|
| 1 | (Germany) Volkswagen Motorsport | WRC | (France) Sébastien Ogier | (France) Julien Ingrassia | Volkswagen Polo R WRC | M |
| 2 | (Germany) Volkswagen Motorsport | WRC | (Finland) Jari-Matti Latvala | (Finland) Miikka Anttila | Volkswagen Polo R WRC | M |
| 3 | (France) Citroën Total Abu Dhabi WRT | WRC | (United Kingdom) Kris Meeke | (Republic of Ireland) Paul Nagle | Citroën DS3 WRC | M |
| 4 | (France) Citroën Total Abu Dhabi WRT | WRC | (Norway) Mads Østberg | (Sweden) Jonas Andersson | Citroën DS3 WRC | M |
| 5 | (United Kingdom) M-Sport Ltd | WRC | (Finland) Mikko Hirvonen | (Finland) Jarmo Lehtinen | Ford Fiesta RS WRC | M |
| 6 | (United Kingdom) M-Sport Ltd | WRC | (United Kingdom) Elfyn Evans | (United Kingdom) Daniel Barritt | Ford Fiesta RS WRC | M |
| 7 | (Germany) Hyundai Shell World Rally Team | WRC | (Belgium) Thierry Neuville | (Belgium) Nicolas Gilsoul | Hyundai i20 WRC | M |
| 8 | (Germany) Hyundai Shell World Rally Team | WRC | (Finland) Juho Hänninen | (Finland) Tomi Tuominen | Hyundai i20 WRC | M |
| 9 | (Germany) Volkswagen Motorsport II | WRC | (Norway) Andreas Mikkelsen | (Norway) Ola Fløene | Volkswagen Polo R WRC | M |
| 10 | (United Kingdom) RK M-Sport World Rally Team | WRC | (Poland) Robert Kubica | (Poland) Maciek Szczepaniak | Ford Fiesta RS WRC | M |
| 11 | (Poland) Michał Sołowow | WRC | (Poland) Michał Sołowow | (Poland) Maciek Baran | Ford Fiesta RS WRC | M |
| 16 | (Norway) Henning Solberg | WRC | (Norway) Henning Solberg | (Austria) Ilka Minor | Ford Fiesta RS WRC | D |
| 20 | (Germany) Hyundai Motorsport N | WRC | (New Zealand) Hayden Paddon | (New Zealand) John Kennard | Hyundai i20 WRC | M |
| 21 | (Czech Republic) Jipocar Czech National Team | WRC | (Czech Republic) Martin Prokop | (Czech Republic) Jan Tománek | Ford Fiesta RS WRC | M |
| 22 | (Poland) Lotto Team | WRC | (Poland) Krzysztof Hołowczyc | (Poland) Łukasz Kurzeja | Ford Fiesta RS WRC | M |
| 31 | (Saudi Arabia) Yazeed Racing | WRC-2 | (Saudi Arabia) Yazeed Al-Rajhi | (United Kingdom) Michael Orr | Ford Fiesta RRC | M |
| 32 | (Estonia) Karl Kruuda | WRC-2 | (Estonia) Karl Kruuda | (Estonia) Martin Järveoja | Peugeot 208 T16 R5 | M |
| 33 | (Italy) www.Rallyproject.com srl | WRC-2 | (Italy) Massimiliano Rendina | (Italy) Mario Pizzuti | Mitsubishi Lancer Evo X | P |
| 35 | (United Kingdom) Drive Dmack | WRC-2 | (Finland) Jari Ketomaa | (Finland) Kaj Lindström | Ford Fiesta R5 | D |
| 36 | (United Kingdom) Drive Dmack | WRC-2 | (Estonia) Ott Tänak | (Estonia) Raigo Mőlder | Ford Fiesta R5 | D |
| 38 | (Portugal) Bernardo Sousa | WRC-2 | (Portugal) Bernardo Sousa | (Portugal) Hugo Magalhães | Ford Fiesta RRC | P |
| 39 | (Ukraine) Eurolamp World Rally Team | WRC-2 | (Ukraine) Valeriy Gorban | (Ukraine) Volodymyr Korsia | Mini John Cooper Works S2000 | M |
| 40 | (Greece) Jourdan Serderidis | WRC-2 | (Greece) Jourdan Serderidis | (Belgium) Frédéric Miclotte | Ford Fiesta R5 | P |
| 41 | (Peru) Nicolás Fuchs | WRC-2 | (Peru) Nicolás Fuchs | (Argentina) Fernando Mussano | Ford Fiesta R5 | D |
| 42 | (Ukraine) AT Rally Team | WRC-2 | (Estonia) Martin Kangur | (Estonia) Kuldar Sikk | Ford Fiesta S2000 | M |
| 44 | (Poland) C-Rally | WRC-2 | (Poland) Jarosław Koltun | (Poland) Ireneusz Pleskot | Ford Fiesta R5 | M |
| 46 | (United Arab Emirates) Skydive Dubai Rally Team | WRC-2 | (United Arab Emirates) Rashid Al Ketbi | (Germany) Karina Hepperle | Ford Fiesta R5 | D |
| 52 | (Italy) Simone Tempestini | WRC-3; JWRC | (Italy) Simone Tempestini | (Romania) Dorin Pulpea | Citroën DS3 R3T | M |
| 53 | (Poland) Aron Domzala | WRC-3; JWRC | (Poland) Aron Domzala | (Poland) Przemek Zawada | Citroën DS3 R3T | M |
| 54 | (Germany) ADAC Weser-Ems | WRC-3; JWRC | (Germany) Christian Riedemann | (Republic of Ireland) Lara Vanneste | Citroën DS3 R3T | M |
| 55 | (France) Quentin Giordano | WRC-3; JWRC | (France) Quentin Giordano | (France) Guillaume Duval | Citroën DS3 R3T | M |
| 56 | (Slovakia) Martin Koči | WRC-3; JWRC | (Slovakia) Martin Koči | (Czech Republic) Lukáš Kosta | Citroën DS3 R3T | M |
| 57 | (France) Stéphane Lefebvre | WRC-3; JWRC | (France) Stéphane Lefebvre | (France) Thomas Dubois | Citroën DS3 R3T | M |
| 58 | (Australia) Molly Taylor | WRC-3; JWRC | (Australia) Molly Taylor | (United Kingdom) Sebastian Marshall | Citroën DS3 R3T | M |
| 59 | (Austria) Team Jaga Motorsport | WRC-3; JWRC | (Cyprus) Panikos Polykarpou | (Austria) Gerald Winter | Citroën DS3 R3T | M |
| 61 | (Switzerland) Federico Della Casa | WRC-3; JWRC | (Switzerland) Federico Della Casa | (Italy) Domenico Pozzi | Citroën DS3 R3T | M |
| 62 | (United Kingdom) Alastair Fisher | WRC-3; JWRC | (United Kingdom) Alastair Fisher | (United Kingdom) Gordon Noble | Citroën DS3 R3T | M |
| 63 | (Austria) Wurmbrand Racing Team | WRC-3; JWRC | (Hungary) Kornél Lukács | (Hungary) Márk Mesterházi | Citroën DS3 R3T | M |
| 72 | (Argentina) Juan Carlos Alonso | WRC-2 | (Argentina) Juan Carlos Alonso | (Argentina) Juan Pablo Monasterolo | Mitsubishi Lancer Evo X | D |
| 74 | (Belgium) Top Teams by MY Racing | WRC-2 | (France) Sébastien Chardonnet | (France) Thibault de la Haye | Citroën DS3 R5 | M |
| 78 | (Chile) Ramón Torres | WRC-2 | (Chile) Ramón Torres | (Argentina) José Díaz | Mitsubishi Lancer Evolution X | D |

| Icon | Class |
|---|---|
| WRC | WRC entries eligible to score manufacturer points |
| WRC | Major entry ineligible to score manufacturer points |
| WRC-2 | Registered to take part in WRC-2 championship |
| WRC-3 | Registered to take part in WRC-3 championship |
| JWRC | Registered to take part in Junior World Rally championship |

== Results ==
=== Event standings ===
| Pos. | No. | Driver | Co-driver | Team | Car | Class | Time | Difference | Points |
Overall classification
| 1 | 1 | (France) Sébastien Ogier | (France) Julien Ingrassia | (Germany) Volkswagen Motorsport | Volkswagen Polo R WRC | WRC | 2:34:02.0 | 0.0 | 28 |
| 2 | 9 | (Norway) Andreas Mikkelsen | (Norway) Ola Fløene | (Germany) Volkswagen Motorsport | Volkswagen Polo R WRC | WRC | 2:35:09.7 | +1:07.7 | 20 |
| 3 | 7 | (Belgium) Thierry Neuville | (Belgium) Nicolas Gilsoul | (Germany) Hyundai Shell World Rally Team | Hyundai i20 WRC | WRC | 2:36:15.5 | +2:13.5 | 15 |
| 4 | 5 | (Finland) Mikko Hirvonen | (Finland) Jarmo Lehtinen | (United Kingdom) M-Sport World Rally Team | Ford Fiesta RS WRC | WRC | 2:36:34.4 | +2:32.4 | 12 |
| 5 | 2 | (Finland) Jari-Matti Latvala | (Finland) Miikka Anttila | (Germany) Volkswagen Motorsport | Volkswagen Polo R WRC | WRC | 2:36:35.1 | +2:33.1 | 11 |
| 6 | 8 | (Finland) Juho Hänninen | (Finland) Tomi Tuominen | (Germany) Hyundai Shell World Rally Team | Hyundai i20 WRC | WRC | 2:36:51.9 | +2:49.9 | 8 |
| 7 | 3 | (United Kingdom) Kris Meeke | (Republic of Ireland) Paul Nagle | (France) Citroën Total Abu Dhabi WRT | Citroën DS3 WRC | WRC | 2:38:29.9 | +4:27.9 | 6 |
| 8 | 20 | (New Zealand) Hayden Paddon | (New Zealand) John Kennard | (Germany) Hyundai Motorsport N | Hyundai i20 WRC | WRC | 2:38:34.1 | +4:32.1 | 4 |
| 9 | 16 | (Norway) Henning Solberg | (Austria) Ilka Minor | (Norway) Henning Solberg | Ford Fiesta RS WRC | WRC | 2:39:01.0 | +4:59.0 | 2 |
| 10 | 21 | (Czech Republic) Martin Prokop | (Czech Republic) Jan Tománek | (Czech Republic) Jipocar Czech National Team | Ford Fiesta RS WRC | WRC | 2:40:13.3 | +6:11.3 | 1 |
WRC-2 standings
| 1 (11.) | 36 | (Estonia) Ott Tänak | (Estonia) Raigo Mõlder | (United Kingdom) Drive Dmack | Ford Fiesta R5 | WRC-2 | 2:42:12.3 | 0.0 | 25 |
| 2 (12.) | 35 | (Finland) Jari Ketomaa | (Finland) Kaj Lindström | (United Kingdom) Drive Dmack | Ford Fiesta R5 | WRC-2 | 2:43:50.5 | +1:38.2 | 18 |
| 3 (13.) | 31 | (Saudi Arabia) Yazeed Al-Rajhi | (United Kingdom) Michael Orr | (Saudi Arabia) Yazeed Racing | Ford Fiesta RRC | WRC-2 | 2:46:23.5 | +4:11.2 | 15 |
| 4 (15.) | 39 | (Ukraine) Valeriy Gorban | (Ukraine) Volodymyr Korsia | (Ukraine) Eurolamp World Rally Team | Mini John Cooper Works S2000 | WRC-2 | 2:47:42.3 | +5:30.0 | 12 |
| 5 (16.) | 38 | (Portugal) Bernardo Sousa | (Portugal) Hugo Magalhães | (Portugal) Bernardo Sousa | Ford Fiesta RRC | WRC-2 | 2:48:47.3 | +6:35.0 | 10 |
| 6 (17.) | 41 | (Peru) Nicolás Fuchs | (Argentina) Fernando Mussano | (Peru) Nicolás Fuchs | Ford Fiesta R5 | WRC-2 | 2:51:22.1 | +9:09.8 | 8 |
| 7 (18.) | 44 | (Poland) Jarosław Kołltun | (Poland) Ireneusz Pleskot | (Poland) C-Rally | Ford Fiesta R5 | WRC-2 | 2:53:29.9 | +11:17.6 | 6 |
| 8 (28.) | 33 | (Italy) Massimiliano Rendina | (Italy) Mario Pizzuti | (Italy) www.Rallyproject.com srl | Mitsubishi Lancer Evolution X | WRC-2 | 3:06:12.3 | +24:00.0 | 4 |
| 9 (30.) | 40 | (Greece) Jourdan Serderidis | (Belgium) Frédéric Miclotte | (Greece) Jourdan Serderidis | Ford Fiesta R5 | WRC-2 | 3:07:40.7 | +25:28.4 | 2 |
| 10 (37.) | 72 | (Argentina) Juan Carlos Alonso | (Argentina) Juan Pablo Monasterolo | (Argentina) Juan Carlos Alonso | Mitsubishi Lancer Evolution X | WRC-2 | 3:12:37.2 | +30:24.9 | 1 |
WRC-3/JWRC standings
| 1 (19.) | 57 | (France) Stéphane Lefebvre | (France) Thomas Dubois | (France) Stéphane Lefebvre | Citroën DS3 R3T | WRC-3; JWRC | 2:58:25.3 | 0.0 | 25 |
| 2 (22.) | 62 | (United Kingdom) Alastair Fisher | (United Kingdom) Gordon Noble | (United Kingdom) Alastair Fisher | Citroën DS3 R3T | WRC-3; JWRC | 3:00:38.6 | +2:13.3 | 18 |
| 3 (23.) | 55 | (France) Quentin Giordano | (France) Guillaume Duval | (France) Quentin Giordano | Citroën DS3 R3T | WRC-3; JWRC | 3:01:51.2 | +3:25.9 | 15 |
| 4 (25.) | 56 | (Slovakia) Martin Koči | (Czech Republic) Lukáš Kostka | (Slovakia) Martin Koči | Citroën DS3 R3T | WRC-3; JWRC | 3:03:17.8 | +4:52.5 | 12 |
| 5 (34.) | 54 | (Germany) Christian Riedemann | (Belgium) Lara Vanneste | (Germany) ADAC Weser-Ems | Citroën DS3 R3T | WRC-3; JWRC | 3:10:41.4 | +12:16.1 | 10 |
| 6 (38.) | 63 | (Hungary) Kornél Lukács | (Hungary) Márk Mesterházi | (Austria) Wurmbrand Racing Team | Citroën DS3 R3T | WRC-3; JWRC | 3:15:47.9 | +17:22.6 | 8 |
| 7 (41.) | 53 | (Poland) Aron Domzala | (Poland) Przemek Zawada | (Italy) Aron Domzala | Citroën DS3 R3T | WRC-3; JWRC | 3:23:51.8 | +25:26.5 | 6 |
| 8 (45.) | 58 | (Australia) Molly Taylor | (United Kingdom) Sebastian Marshall | (Australia) Molly Taylor | Citroën DS3 R3T | WRC-3; JWRC | 3:36:35.6 | +38:10.3 | 4 |
| 9 (50.) | 51 | (Switzerland) Federico Della Casa | (Italy) Domenico Pozzi | (Switzerland) Federico Della Casa | Citroën DS3 R3T | WRC-3; JWRC | 3:48:20.2 | +49:54.9 | 2 |

=== Special stages ===
| Day | Stage | Name | Length | Winner | Car | Time | Rally leader |
|---|---|---|---|---|---|---|---|
| Leg 1 (26 June) | SS1 | (Poland) Milki 1 | 14.54 km | (France) Sébastien Ogier | Volkswagen Polo R WRC | 6:54.0 | (France) Sébastien Ogier |
| Leg 1 (26 June) | SS2 | (Poland) Kruklanki 1 | 17.24 km | (Finland) Juho Hänninen | Hyundai i20 WRC | 9:05.1 | (Norway) Andreas Mikkelsen |
| Leg 1 (26 June) | SS3 | (Poland) SSS Mikolajki Arena 1 | 2.50 km | (France) Sébastien Ogier | Volkswagen Polo R WRC | 12:20.8 | (France) Sébastien Ogier |
| Leg 1 (27 June) | SS4 | (Poland) Wieliczki 1 | 12.89 km | (Norway) Andreas Mikkelsen | Volkswagen Polo R WRC | 5:48.3 | (Norway) Andreas Mikkelsen |
| Leg 1 (27 June) | SS5 | (Lithuania) Kapciamiestis 1 | 13.69 km | (Norway) Mads Østberg | Citroën DS3 WRC | 6:21.5 | (Norway) Andreas Mikkelsen |
| Leg 1 (27 June) | SS6 | (Lithuania) Margionys 1 | 17.97 km | (France) Sébastien Ogier | Volkswagen Polo R WRC | 9:51.3 | (France) Sébastien Ogier |
| Leg 1 (27 June) | SS7 | (Lithuania) Kapciamiestis 2 | 13.69 km | Stage Cancelled | | | |
| Leg 1 (27 June) | SS8 | (Lithuania) Margionys 2 | 17.97 km | Stage Cancelled | | | |
| Leg 1 (27 June) | SS9 | (Poland) Wieliczki 2 | 12.89 km | (Norway) Andreas Mikkelsen | Volkswagen Polo R WRC | 5:39.0 | (Norway) Andreas Mikkelsen |
| Leg 1 (27 June) | SS10 | (Poland) SSS Mikolajki Arena 2 | 2.50 km | (France) Sébastien Ogier | Volkswagen Polo R WRC | 1:46.9 | (France) Sébastien Ogier |
| Leg 2 (28 June) | SS11 | (Poland) Chmielewo 1 | 6.75 km | (Norway) Andreas Mikkelsen | Volkswagen Polo R WRC | 3:21.7 | (France) Sébastien Ogier |
| Leg 2 (28 June) | SS12 | (Poland) Stare Juchy 1 | 14.41 km | (Norway) Mads Østberg | Citroën DS3 WRC | 7:31.1 | (France) Sébastien Ogier |
| Leg 2 (28 June) | SS13 | (Poland) Babki 1 | 15.76 km | (France) Sébastien Ogier | Volkswagen Polo R WRC | 7:43.8 | (France) Sébastien Ogier |
| Leg 2 (28 June) | SS14 | (Poland) Goldap 1 | 35.17 km | (France) Sébastien Ogier | Volkswagen Polo R WRC | 17:21.7 | (France) Sébastien Ogier |
| Leg 2 (28 June) | SS15 | (Poland) Baranowo 1 | 14.90 km | (France) Sébastien Ogier | Volkswagen Polo R WRC | 7:35.9 | (France) Sébastien Ogier |
| Leg 2 (28 June) | SS16 | (Poland) Chmielwo 2 | 6.75 km | (France) Sébastien Ogier | Volkswagen Polo R WRC | 3:20.2 | (France) Sébastien Ogier |
| Leg 2 (28 June) | SS17 | (Poland) Stare Juchy 2 | 14.41 km | (Belgium) Thierry Neuville | Hyundai i20 WRC | 7:24.8 | (France) Sébastien Ogier |
| Leg 2 (28 June) | SS18 | (Poland) Babki 2 | 15.76 km | (Finland) Jari-Matti Latvala | Volkswagen Polo R WRC | 7:40.1 | (France) Sébastien Ogier |
| Leg 2 (28 June) | SS19 | (Poland) Goldap 2 | 35.17 km | (Finland) Jari-Matti Latvala | Volkswagen Polo R WRC | 17:21.7 | (France) Sébastien Ogier |
| Leg 2 (28 June) | SS20 | (Poland) SSS Mikolajki Arena 3 | 2.50 km | (France) Sébastien Ogier | Volkswagen Polo R WRC | 1:48.8 | (France) Sébastien Ogier |
| Leg 3 (29 June) | SS21 | (Poland) Milki 2 | 14.54 km | (Finland) Jari-Matti Latvala | Volkswagen Polo R WRC | 6:53.4 | (France) Sébastien Ogier |
| Leg 3 (29 June) | SS22 | (Poland) Kruklanki 2 | 17.24 km | (Finland) Jari-Matti Latvala | Volkswagen Polo R WRC | 8:57.0 | (France) Sébastien Ogier |
| Leg 3 (29 June) | SS23 | (Poland) SSS Mikolajki Arena 4 | 2.50 km | (Finland) Jari-Matti Latvala | Volkswagen Polo R WRC | 1:47.2 | (France) Sébastien Ogier |
| Leg 3 (29 June) | SS24 | (Poland) Baranowo 2 (Power Stage) | 14.90 km | (France) Sébastien Ogier | Volkswagen Polo R WRC | 7:22.3 | (France) Sébastien Ogier |

=== Power Stage ===
The "Power stage" was a 14.90 km (9.26 mi) stage at the end of the rally.

| Pos | Driver | Car | Time | Diff. | Pts |
|---|---|---|---|---|---|
| 1 | (France) Sébastien Ogier | Volkswagen Polo R WRC | 7:22.3 | 0.0 | 3 |
| 2 | (Norway) Andreas Mikkelsen | Volkswagen Polo R WRC | 7:23.8 | +1.5 | 2 |
| 3 | (Finland) Jari-Matti Latvala | Volkswagen Polo R WRC | 7:24.6 | +2.3 | 1 |

== Standings after the rally ==
=== WRC ===
Drivers' Championship standings

| Pos. | Driver | Points |
|---|---|---|
| 1 | (France) Sebastien Ogier | 166 |
| 2 | (Finland) Jari-Matti Latvala | 116 |
| 3 | (Norway) Andreas Mikkelsen | 83 |
| 4 | (Norway) Mads Ostberg | 66 |
| 5 | (Finland) Mikko Hirvonen | 52 |

Manufacturers' Championship standings

| Pos. | Manufacturer | Points |
|---|---|---|
| 1 | (Germany) Volkswagen Motorsport | 262 |
| 2 | (France) Citroën Total Abu Dhabi WRT | 115 |
| 3 | (United Kingdom) M-Sport World Rally Team | 90 |
| 4 | (Germany) Volkswagen Motorsport II | 82 |
| 5 | (Germany) Hyundai Shell World Rally Team | 80 |

=== Other ===
WRC2 Drivers' Championship standings

| Pos. | Driver | Points |
|---|---|---|
| 1 | (Italy) Lorenzo Bertelli | 81 |
| 2 | (Ukraine) Yuriy Protasov | 75 |
| 3 | (Finland) Jari Ketomaa | 54 |
| 4 | (Qatar) Nasser Al-Attiyah | 50 |
| 5 | (Estonia) Karl Kruuda | 49 |

WRC3 Drivers' Championship standings

| Pos. | Driver | Points |
|---|---|---|
| 1 | (France) Stéphane Lefebvre | 50 |
| 2 | (Germany) Christian Riedemann | 28 |
| 3 | (Slovakia) Martin Koči | 27 |
| 4 | (France) Quentin Gilbert | 25 |
| 5 | (United Kingdom) Alastair Fisher | 18 |

Junior WRC Drivers' Championship standings

| Pos. | Driver | Points |
|---|---|---|
| 1 | (France) Stéphane Lefebvre | 50 |
| 2 | (Germany) Christian Riedemann | 28 |
| 3 | (Slovakia) Martin Koči | 27 |
| 4 | (United Kingdom) Alastair Fisher | 18 |
| 5 | (France) Quentin Giordano | 16 |
