= Stéphane Lefebvre =

French rally driver (born 1992)

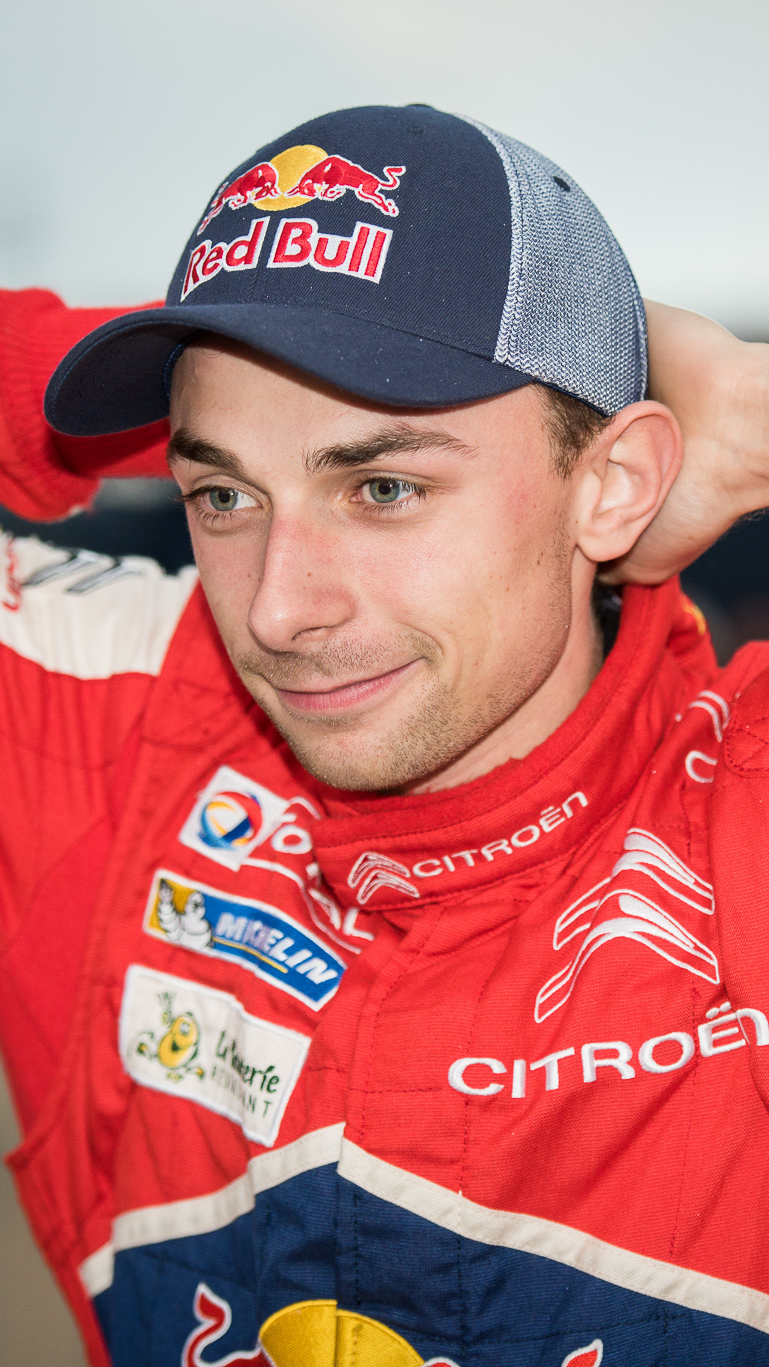
- Stéphane Lefebvre at Rallye Deutschland 2014

Personal information
- Nationality: (France) French
- Full name: Stéphane Philippe Emmanuel Lefebvre
- Born: March 16, 1992 (age 34); Nœux-les-Mines, France

World Rally Championship record
- Years active: 2013–present
- Teams: Citroën Total Abu Dhabi World Rally Team
- Rallies: 49
- Championships: 0
- Rally wins: 0
- Podiums: 0
- Stage wins: 3
- Total points: 58
- First rally: 2013 Rallye de France

Stéphane Philippe Emmanuel Lefebvre (born 16 March 1992) is a rally driver from France.

Lefebvre won the World Rally Championship-3 and Junior World Rally Championship in the 2014 season, and scored his first points at the 2015 Rallye Deutschland, his first time driving a World Rally Car.

== Results ==
=== WRC results ===
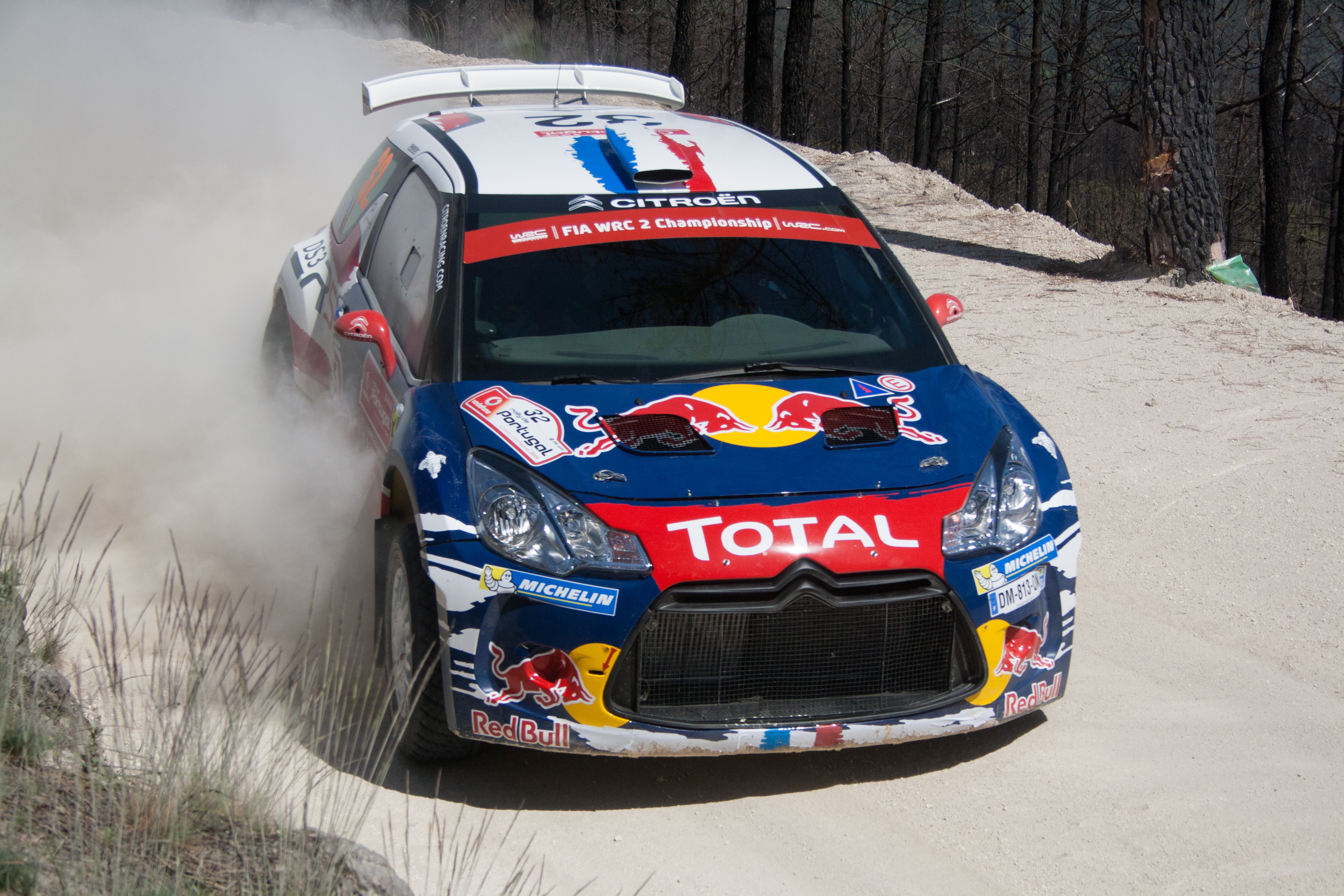
Stéphane Lefebvre in 2015 Rally de Portugal.

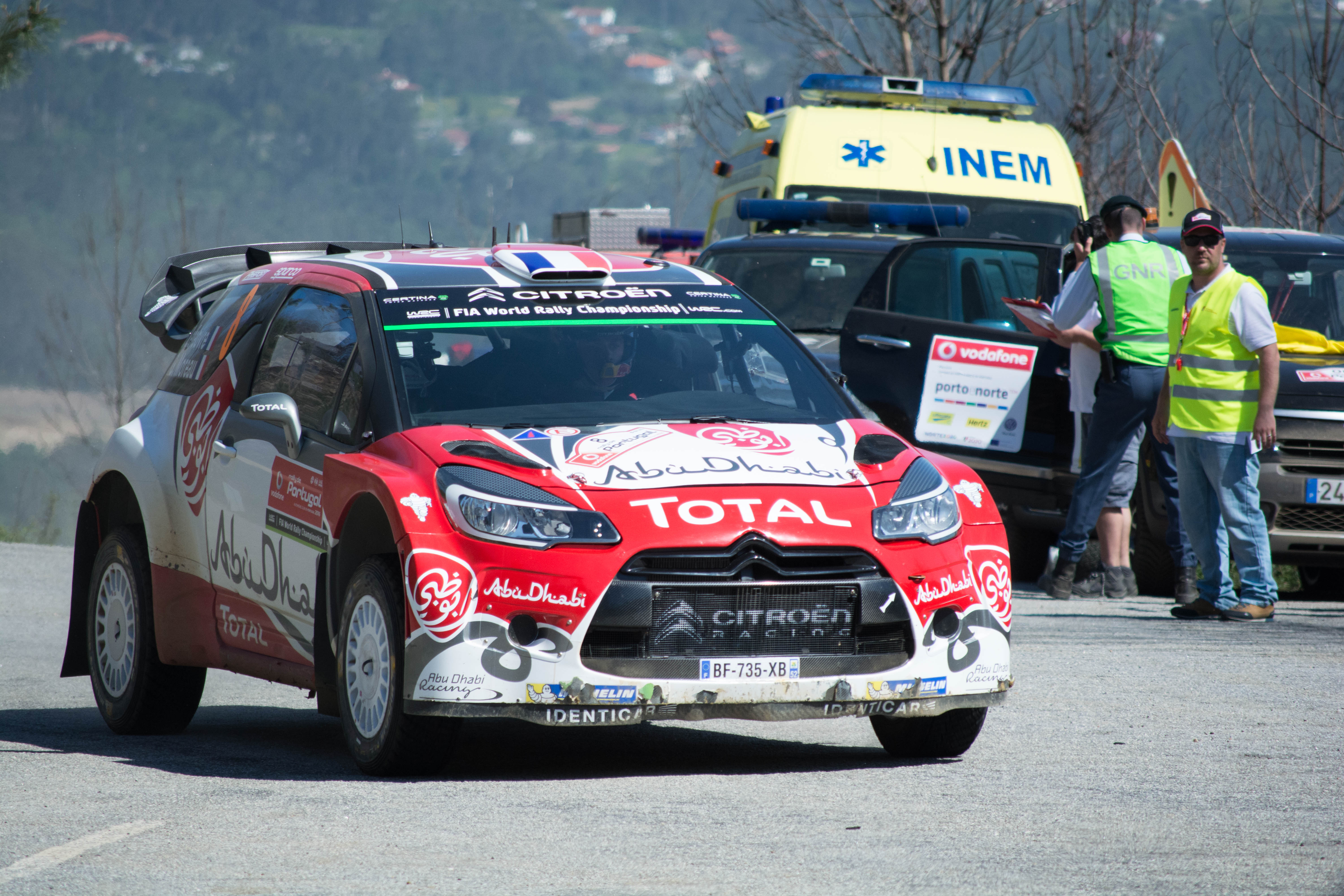
Stéphane Lefebvre in 2016 Rally de Portugal.

Year	Entrant	Car	1	2	3	4	5	6	7	8	9	10	11	12	13	14	WDC	Points
2013	Equipe de France FFSA	Peugeot 208 R2	MON	SWE	MEX	POR	ARG	GRE	ITA	FIN	GER	AUS	FRA; 20	ESP	GBR		NC	0
2014	Stéphane Lefebvre	Citroën DS3 R3T	MON	SWE	MEX	POR; 26	ARG	ITA	POL; 19	FIN; 45	GER; 19	AUS	FRA; EX				NC	0
2014	Stéphane Lefebvre	Citroën DS3 R5												ESP; Ret	GBR; 35		NC	0
2015	PH-Sport	Citroën DS3 R5	MON; 12	SWE; Ret	MEX; Ret	ARG; Ret	POR; 15										19th	5
2015	PH-Sport	Citroën DS3 RRC						ITA; 26	POL; Ret	FIN; EX							19th	5
2015	PH-Sport	Citroën DS3 WRC												ESP; 50			19th	5
2015	Citroën Total Abu Dhabi WRT	Citroën DS3 WRC									GER; 10	AUS; 13	FRA; 11		GBR; 8		19th	5
2016	Abu Dhabi Total WRT	Citroën DS3 WRC	MON; 5	SWE	MEX	ARG	POR; 35	ITA	POL; 9	FIN		CHN; C	FRA	ESP	GBR; 9	AUS	13th	14
2016	Stéphane Lefebvre	Citroën DS3 WRC									GER; Ret						13th	14
2017	Citroën Total Abu Dhabi WRT	Citroën C3 WRC	MON; 9		MEX; 15	FRA; 50	ARG	POR; 13	ITA	POL; 5	FIN	GER	ESP; 6	GBR	AUS; Ret		13th	30
2017	Citroën Total Abu Dhabi WRT	Citroën DS3 WRC		SWE; 8													13th	30
2018	Citroën Total Rallye Team	Citroën C3 R5	MON	SWE	MEX	FRA; Ret	ARG	POR; 10	ITA; 24	FIN; 44	GER; 16	TUR	GBR; 13	ESP; 32	AUS		29th	1
2019	Stéphane Lefebvre	Volkswagen Polo GTI R5	MON	SWE	MEX	FRA	ARG	CHL	POR	ITA	FIN	GER; Ret	TUR	GBR	ESP	AUS; C	NC	0
2020	D-Max Swiss	Citroën C3 R5	MON	SWE	MEX	EST	TUR	ITA	MNZ; 12								NC	0
2021	Gilles De Turckheim	Citroën C3 R5	MON	ARC	CRO	POR	ITA	KEN	EST	BEL	GRE	FIN	ESP	MNZ; 18			NC	0
2022	DG Sport Compétition	Citroën C3 Rally2	MON; Ret	SWE	CRO; 12	POR; WD	ITA	KEN	EST	FIN	BEL; 6	GRE	NZL	ESP	JPN		22nd	8
2023	Stéphane Lefebvre	Citroën C3 Rally2	MON; 18	SWE	MEX	CRO	POR	ITA	KEN	EST	FIN	GRE	CHL	EUR	JPN		NC	0
2024	Stéphane Lefebvre	Toyota GR Yaris Rally2	MON; 13	SWE	KEN	CRO	POR	ITA	POL	LAT	FIN	GRE	CHL	EUR	JPN		NC*	0*

* Season still in progress.

=== WRC-2 results ===
Year	Entrant	Car	1	2	3	4	5	6	7	8	9	10	11	12	13	14	Pos.	Points
2014	Stéphane Lefebvre	Citroën DS3 R5	MON	SWE	MEX	ARG	POR	ITA	POL	FIN	GER	AUS	FRA	ESP; Ret	GBR; 11		NC	0
2015	PH Sport	Citroën DS3 R5	MON; 1	SWE	MEX; Ret	ARG	POR; 5										14th	35
2015	PH Sport	Citroën DS3 RRC						ITA; 15	POL; Ret	FIN; EX	GER	AUS	FRA	ESP	GBR		14th	35
2018	Citroën Total Rallye Team	Citroën C3 R5	MON	SWE	MEX	FRA; Ret	ARG	POR; 3	ITA; 8	FIN; 13	GER; 8	TUR	GBR; 5	ESP; 15	AUS		13th	33
2019	Stéphane Lefebvre	Volkswagen Polo GTI R5	MON	SWE	MEX	FRA	ARG	CHL	POR	ITA	FIN	GER; Ret	TUR	GBR	ESP	AUS; C	NC	0
2022	DG Sport Compétition	Citroën C3 Rally2	MON; Ret	SWE	CRO; 6	POR; WD	ITA	KEN	EST	FIN	BEL; 1	GRE	NZL	ESP	JPN		12th	36
2023	Stéphane Lefebvre	Citroën C3 Rally2	MON; 9	SWE	MEX	CRO	POR	ITA	KEN	EST	FIN	GRE	CHL	EUR	JPN		42th	3
2024	Stéphane Lefebvre	Toyota GR Yaris Rally2	MON; 5	SWE	KEN	CRO	POR	ITA	POL	LAT	FIN	GRE	CHL	EUR	JPN		12th*	10*

* Season still in progress.

=== WRC-3 results ===
Year	Entrant	Car	1	2	3	4	5	6	7	8	9	10	11	12	13	Pos.	Points
2014	Stéphane Lefebvre	Citroën DS3 R3T	MON	SWE	MEX	POR; 1	ARG	ITA	POL; 1	FIN; 8	GER; 1	AUS	FRA; EX	ESP	GBR	1st	79

=== JWRC results ===
Year	Entrant	Car	1	2	3	4	5	6	Pos.	Points
2014	Stéphane Lefebvre	Citroën DS3 R3T	POR; 1	POL; 1	FIN; 7	GER; 1	FRA; 4	GBR	1st	93

Sporting positions
Preceded by Pontus Tidemand	Junior World Rally; Champion; 2014	Succeeded by Quentin Gilbert
Preceded by Sébastien Chardonnet	World Rally-3; Champion; 2014	Succeeded by Quentin Gilbert
