= Jari Ketomaa =

Finnish rally driver (born 1979)

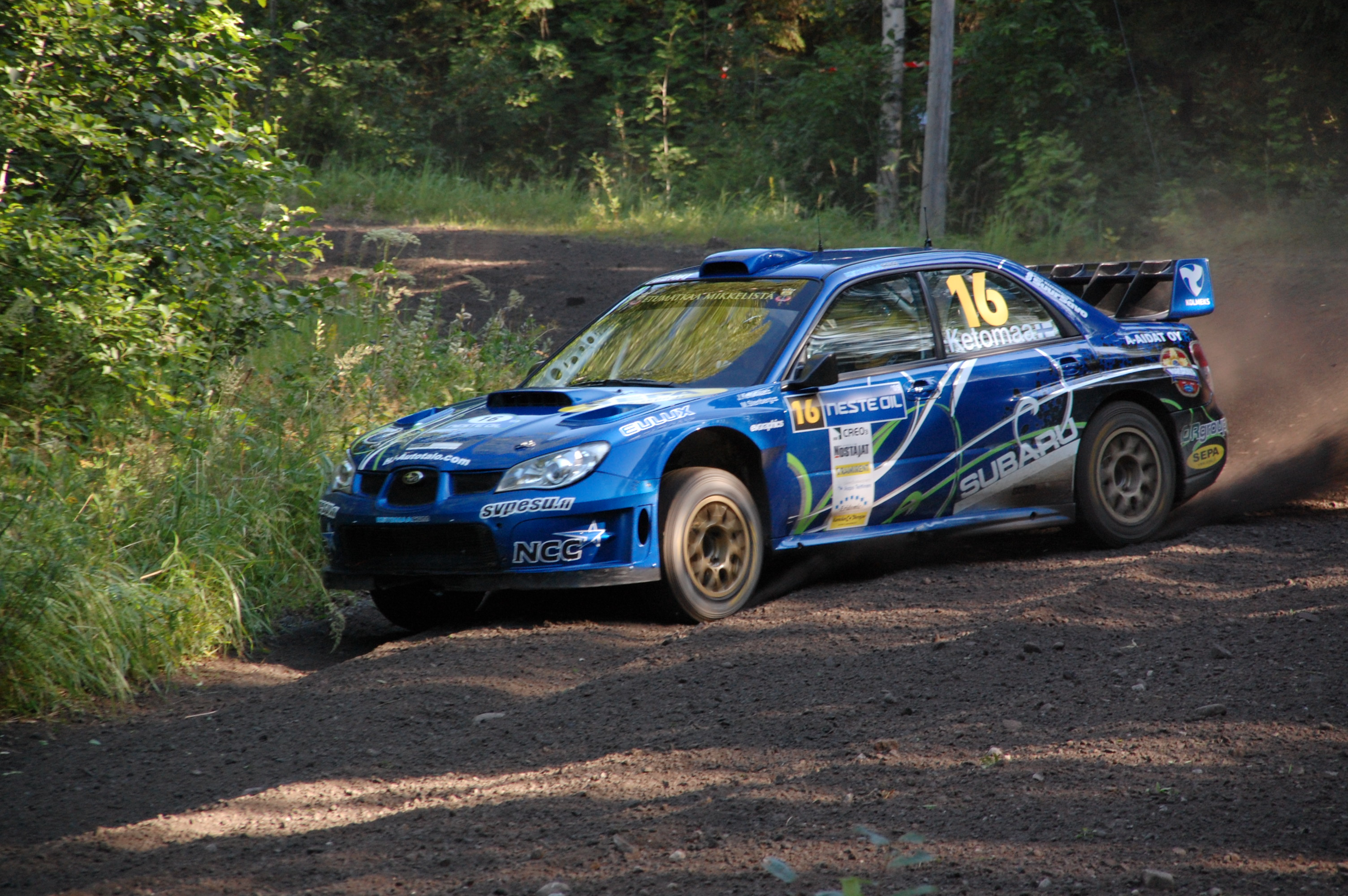
- Ketomaa on his way to a seventh place finish on 2009 Rally Finland

Personal information
- Nationality: (Finland) Finnish
- Born: April 18, 1979 (age 47)

World Rally Championship record
- Years active: 2000–2002, 2007–2015
- Co-driver: (Finland) Petri Lantta (Finland) Ossi Lehtonen (Finland) Miika Teiskonen (Finland) Mika Stenberg (Finland) Kaj Lindström (Finland) Marko Sallinen (Finland) Tapio Souminen
- Rallies: 42
- Championships: 0
- Rally wins: 0
- Podiums: 0
- Stage wins: 1
- Total points: 24
- First rally: 2000 Rally Finland
- Last rally: 2015 Rally Catalunya

Jari Ketomaa (born 18 April 1979) is a Finnish former rally driver.

== Career ==
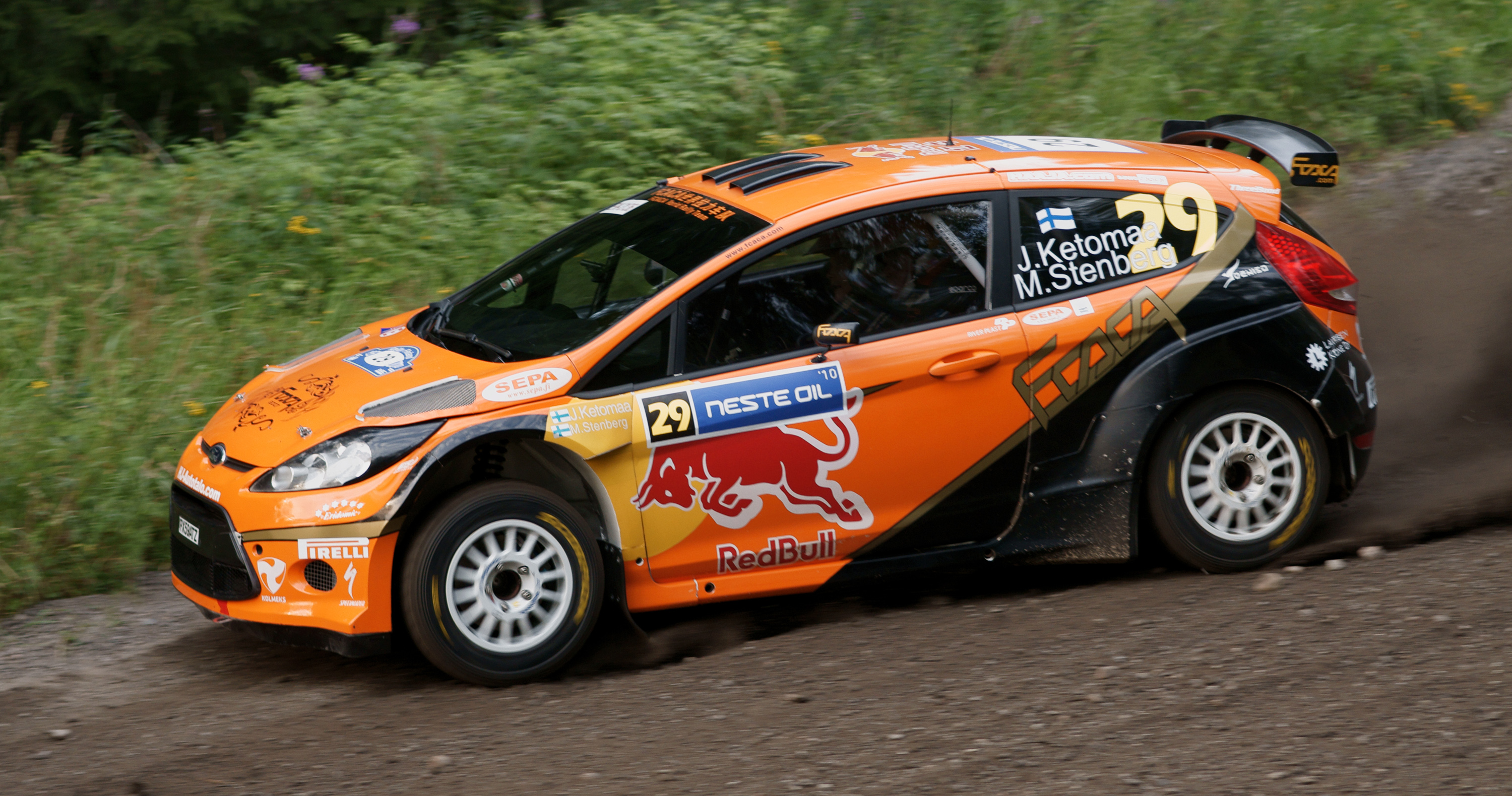
Ketomaa at the 2010 Rally Finland

A former kart racer, Ketomaa started rallying in 1995. He made his World Rally Championship debut in 2000 at Rally Finland. He won the Group N class of the Finnish Rally Championship in 2006 and 2007. In 2008, he competed a full season in the Production World Rally Championship, finishing the season third in the standings. Ketomaa regained the Finnish Group N title in 2009. He also made his debut in a World Rally Car at 2009 Rally Finland, finishing seventh overall. In 2010, Ketomaa is competing in the Super 2000 World Rally Championship in a Ford Fiesta S2000. In 2011, Ketomaa raced in Rally Finland with Ford Fiesta RS WRC and lead after first special stage but later retired from top 5 position.

== Career results ==
=== World Rally Championship results ===
Year	Entrant	Car	1	2	3	4	5	6	7	8	9	10	11	12	13	14	15	16	WDC	Pts
2000	Jari Ketomaa	Subaru Impreza 555	MON	SWE	KEN	POR	ESP	ARG	GRC	NZL	FIN; Ret	CYP	FRA	ITA	AUS	GBR			NC	0
2001	Jari Ketomaa	Subaru Impreza 555	MON	SWE	POR	ESP	ARG	CYP	GRE	KEN	FIN; Ret	NZL	ITA	FRA	AUS	GBR			NC	0
2002	Jari Ketomaa	Subaru Impreza 555	MON	SWE; 30	FRA	ESP	CYP	ARG	GRE	KEN									NC	0
2002	Jari Ketomaa	Subaru Impreza WRX									FIN; Ret	GER	ITA	NZL	AUS	GBR			NC	0
2007	Jari Ketomaa	Mitsubishi Lancer Evolution IX	MON	SWE	NOR	MEX	POR	ARG	ITA	GRE	FIN; Ret	GER	NZL	ESP	FRA	JPN	IRE	GBR	NC	0
2008	Motoring Club	Subaru Impreza STi N14	MON	SWE; 10	MEX		JOR	ITA	GRE; Ret	TUR	FIN; 16	GER	NZL; 15	ESP	FRA		GBR; 17		NC	0
2008	Motoring Club	Subaru Impreza STi N12				ARG; 10													NC	0
2008	Subaru Rally Team Japan	Subaru Impreza STi N14														JPN; Ret			NC	0
2009	Jari Ketomaa	Subaru Impreza WRC	IRE	NOR	CYP	POR	ARG	ITA	GRE	POL	FIN; 7	AUS	ESP	GBR					17th	2
2010	Shanghai FCACA Rally Team	Ford Fiesta S2000	SWE	MEX	JOR; 25	TUR	NZL; 8	POR; 11	BUL	FIN; Ret	GER	JPN; 9	FRA; 11	ESP	GBR; Ret				14th	6
2011	JR Motorsport	Mitsubishi Lancer Evolution X	SWE	MEX	POR	JOR	ITA; Ret												NC	0
2011	HJ-Autotalo.com	Ford Fiesta RS WRC						ARG	GRE	FIN; Ret	GER	AUS	FRA	ESP	GBR				NC	0
2012	Jari Ketomaa	Ford Fiesta RS WRC	MON	SWE; Ret	MEX	POR; 9	ARG	GRE	NZL; 11	FIN; 8	GER	GBR	FRA	ITA	ESP				23rd	6
2013	Jari Ketomaa	Ford Fiesta RS WRC	MON	SWE; Ret	MEX	POR	ARG	GRE	ITA										17th	8
2013	DMACK - Autotek	Ford Fiesta R5								FIN; 7	GER	AUS	FRA	ESP	GBR; 9				17th	8
2014	Drive Dmack	Ford Fiesta R5	MON	SWE; 12	MEX	POR; 10	ARG; 21	ITA	POL; 12	FIN; 11	GER	AUS; 12	FRA	ESP	GBR; 12				27th	1
2015	Drive Dmack	Ford Fiesta R5	MON	SWE; 13	MEX; 10	ARG; 12	POR; Ret	ITA	POL; 17	FIN	GER	AUS	FRA	ESP; 36	GBR; WD				30th	1

==== PWRC results ====
Year	Entrant	Car	1	2	3	4	5	6	7	8	Pos.	Points
2008	Motoring Club	Subaru Impreza STi N14	SWE; 2		GRE; Ret	TUR	FIN; 3	NZL; 4	JPN	GBR; 4	3rd	28
2008	Motoring Club	Subaru Impreza STi N12		ARG; 3							3rd	28

==== SWRC results ====
Year	Entrant	Car	1	2	3	4	5	6	7	8	9	10	Pos.	Points
2010	Shanghai FCACA Rally Team	Ford Fiesta S2000	SWE	MEX	JOR; 6	NZL; 1	POR; 1	FIN; Ret	GER	JPN; 1	FRA; 2	GBR; Ret	4th	101

==== WRC-2 results ====
Year	Entrant	Car	1	2	3	4	5	6	7	8	9	10	11	12	13	Pos.	Points
2013	DMACK - Autotek	Ford Fiesta R5	MON	SWE	MEX	POR	ARG	GRE	ITA	FIN; 1	GER	AUS	FRA	ESP	GBR; 2	11th	43
2014	Drive Dmack	Ford Fiesta R5	MON	SWE; 2	MEX	POR; 2	ARG; 11	ITA	POL; 2	FIN; 2	GER	AUS; 2	FRA	ESP	GBR; 1	2nd	115
2015	Drive Dmack	Ford Fiesta R5	MON	SWE; 1	MEX; 3	ARG; 3	POR; Ret	ITA	POL; 4	FIN	GER	AUS	FRA	ESP; 12	GBR; WD	6th	67
