= 2014 Wales Rally GB =

Rally car race

2014 Wales Rally GB 70th Wales Rally of Great Britain
Round 13 of 13 in the 2014 World Rally Championship
← Previous event
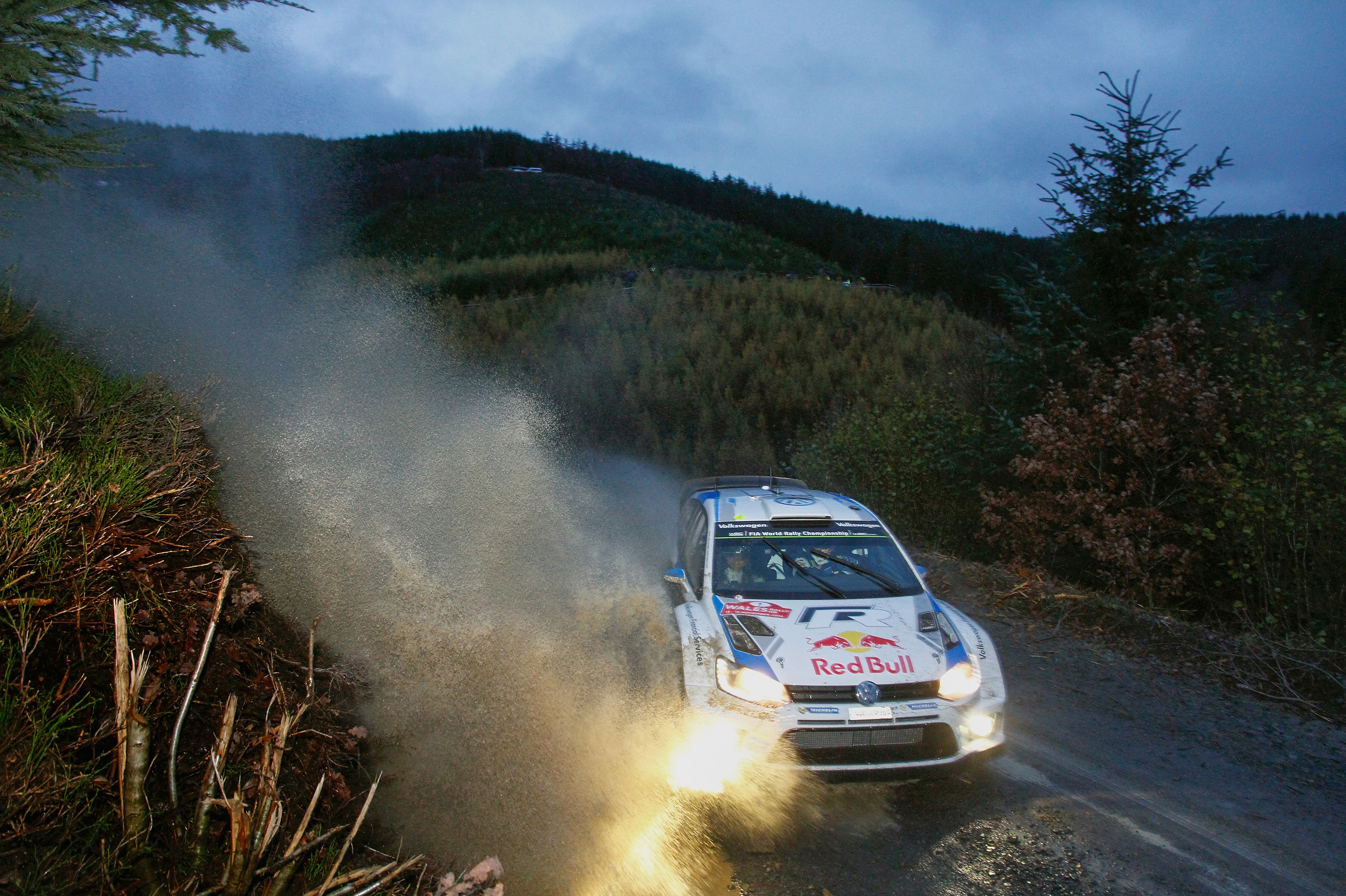
- Host country: United Kingdom
- Rally base: Deeside
- Dates run: November 13 – 16, 2014
- Stages: 23 (305.64 km; 189.92 miles)
- Stage surface: Gravel

Statistics
- Crews: 63 at start, 53 at finish

Overall results
- Overall winner: (France) Sébastien Ogier (France) Julien Ingrassia (Germany) Volkswagen Motorsport; 3:03:08.2
- Power Stage winner: (Finland) Jari-Matti Latvala (Finland) Miikka Anttila (Germany) Volkswagen Motorsport

The 70th Wales Rally of Great Britain was the thirteenth and final round of the 2014 World Rally Championship, held from 13 to 16 November, 2014. The rally was won by Sébastien Ogier in his eighth victory of the season, after winning the championship at the previous rally.

== Results ==
=== Event standings ===
Pos.	No.	Driver	Co-driver	Team	Car	Class	Time	Difference	Points
Overall classification
1	1	(France) Sébastien Ogier	(France) Julien Ingrassia	(Germany) Volkswagen Motorsport	Volkswagen Polo R WRC	WRC	3:03:08.2	0.0	25
2	5	(Finland) Mikko Hirvonen	(Finland) Jarmo Lehtinen	(United Kingdom) M-Sport World Rally Team	Ford Fiesta RS WRC	WRC	3:03:45.8	+37.6	18
3	4	(Norway) Mads Østberg	(Sweden) Jonas Andersson	(France) Citroën Total Abu Dhabi WRT	Citroën DS3 WRC	WRC	3:04:11.8	+1:03.6	16
4	7	(Belgium) Thierry Neuville	(Belgium) Nicolas Gilsoul	(South Korea) Hyundai Shell World Rally Team	Hyundai i20 WRC	WRC	3:04:23.1	+1:14.9	14
5	6	(United Kingdom) Elfyn Evans	(United Kingdom) Daniel Barritt	(United Kingdom) M-Sport World Rally Team	Ford Fiesta RS WRC	WRC	3:04:32.5	+1:24.3	10
6	3	(United Kingdom) Kris Meeke	(Republic of Ireland) Paul Nagle	(France) Citroën Total Abu Dhabi WRT	Citroën DS3 WRC	WRC	3:05:11.2	+2:03.0	8
7	22	(Estonia) Ott Tänak	(Estonia) Raigo Mölder	(United Kingdom) Drive DMACK	Ford Fiesta RS WRC	WRC	3:05:37.9	+2:29.7	6
8	2	(Finland) Jari-Matti Latvala	(Finland) Miikka Anttila	(Germany) Volkswagen Motorsport	Volkswagen Polo R WRC	WRC	3:05:55.7	+2:47.5	7
9	21	(Czech Republic) Martin Prokop	(Czech Republic) Jan Tománek	(Czech Republic) Jipocar Czech National Team	Ford Fiesta RS WRC	WRC	3:06:51.5	+3:43.3	2
10	20	(New Zealand) Hayden Paddon	(New Zealand) John Kennard	(South Korea) Hyundai Motorsport N	Hyundai i20 WRC	WRC	3:06:56.7	+3:48.5	1
WRC-2 standings
1 (12.)	35	(Finland) Jari Ketomaa	(Finland) Kaj Lindström	(United Kingdom) Drive DMACK	Ford Fiesta R5	WRC-2	3:14:08.1	0.0	25
2 (13.)	37	(Italy) Lorenzo Bertelli	(Italy) Mitia Dotta	(Italy) FWRT s.r.l.	Ford Fiesta R5	WRC-2	3:15:05.8	+57.4	18
3 (14.)	31	(United Kingdom) Matthew Wilson	(United Kingdom) Scott Martin	(Saudi Arabia) Yazeed Racing	Ford Fiesta RRC	WRC-2	3:15:25.3	+1:17.2	15
4 (15.)	46	(United Kingdom) Tom Cave	(United Kingdom) Craig Parry	MZR Paraguay	Ford Fiesta R5	WRC-2	3:15:36.5	+1:28.4	12
5 (16.)	36	(Estonia) Karl Kruuda	(Estonia) Martin Järveoja	(Finland) Printsport Racing	Ford Fiesta S2000	WRC-2	3:16:09.7	+2:01.6	10
6 (17.)	32	(Qatar) Nasser Al-Attiyah	(Italy) Giovanni Bernacchini	Qatar World Rally Team	Ford Fiesta RRC	WRC-2	3:16:45.1	+2:37.0	8
7 (19.)	40	(Ukraine) Valeriy Gorban	(Ukraine) Volodymyr Korsia	(Ukraine) Eurolamp World Rally Team	Mini John Cooper Works WRC	WRC-2	3:17:28.9	+3:20.8	6
8 (21.)	39	(France) Quentin Gilbert	(Belgium) Renaud Jamoul	(United Kingdom) M-Sport	Ford Fiesta R5	WRC-2	3:20:33.2	+6:25.1	4
9 (23.)	41	(Peru) Nicolás Fuchs	(Argentina) Fernando Mussano	(United Kingdom) M-Sport	Ford Fiesta R5	WRC-2	3:25:40.6	+11:32.5	2
10 (33.)	38	(Greece) Jourdan Serderidis	(Belgium) Frédéric Miclotte	(Belgium) J-Motorsport	Ford Fiesta R5	WRC-2	3:36:46.2	+22:38.1	1
WRC-3 standings
1 (26.)	62	(United Kingdom) Alastair Fisher	(United Kingdom) Gordon Noble	(United Kingdom) Alastair Fisher	Citroën DS3 R3T	WRC-3	3:31:20.1	0.0	25
2 (28.)	56	(Slovakia) Martin Koči	(Czech Republic) Lukáš Kostka	(Slovakia) Styllex Slovak National Team	Citroën DS3 R3T	WRC-3	3:32:38.9	+1:18.8	18
3 (31.)	73	(Finland) Henri Haapamäki	(Finland) Marko Salminen	(Finland) Hannu's Rally Team	Citroën DS3 R3T	WRC-3	3:34:14.6	+2:54.5	15
4 (32.)	58	(Australia) Molly Taylor	(United Kingdom) Sebastian Marshall	(Australia) Molly Taylor	Citroën DS3 R3T	WRC-3	3:35:57.2	+4:37.1	12
5 (36.)	53	(Poland) Aron Domżała	(Poland) Kamil Heller	(Poland) Aron Domżała	Citroën DS3 R3T	WRC-3	3:37:31.9	+6:11.8	10
6 (49.)	55	(France) Quentin Giordano	(France) Valentin Sarreaud	(France) Quentin Giordano	Citroën DS3 R3T	WRC-3	4:09:57.8	+38:37.7	8
JWRC standings
1 (26.)	62	(United Kingdom) Alastair Fisher	(United Kingdom) Gordon Noble	(United Kingdom) Alastair Fisher	Citroën DS3 R3T	JWRC	3:31:20.1	0.0	25
2 (28.)	56	(Slovakia) Martin Koči	(Czech Republic) Lukáš Kostka	(Slovakia) Styllex Slovak National Team	Citroën DS3 R3T	JWRC	3:32:38.9	+1:18.8	18
3 (31.)	73	(Finland) Henri Haapamäki	(Finland) Marko Salminen	(Finland) Hannu's Rally Team	Citroën DS3 R3T	JWRC	3:34:14.6	+2:54.5	15
4 (32.)	58	(Australia) Molly Taylor	(United Kingdom) Sebastian Marshall	(Australia) Molly Taylor	Citroën DS3 R3T	JWRC	3:35:57.2	+4:37.1	12
5 (36.)	53	(Poland) Aron Domżała	(Poland) Kamil Heller	(Poland) Aron Domżała	Citroën DS3 R3T	JWRC	3:37:31.9	+6:11.8	10
6 (49.)	55	(France) Quentin Giordano	(France) Valentin Sarreaud	(France) Quentin Giordano	Citroën DS3 R3T	JWRC	4:09:57.8	+38:37.7	8

=== Special stages ===
Day	Stage	Name	Length	Winner	Car	Time	Rally Leader
Leg 1 (31 July)	SS1	Gartheiniog 1	14.58 km	(France) Sébastien Ogier	Volkswagen Polo R WRC	8:34.3	(France) Sébastien Ogier
Leg 1 (31 July)	SS2	Dyfi 1	21.90 km	(France) Sébastien Ogier	Volkswagen Polo R WRC	12:25.9	(France) Sébastien Ogier
Leg 1 (31 July)	SS3	Hafren Sweet Lamb 1	23.55 km	(Finland) Jari-Matti Latvala	Volkswagen Polo R WRC	13:39.1	(France) Sébastien Ogier
Leg 1 (31 July)	SS4	Maesnant 1	12.86 km	(France) Sébastien Ogier	Volkswagen Polo R WRC	7:52.6	(France) Sébastien Ogier
Leg 1 (31 July)	SS5	Gartheiniog 2	14.58 km	(Finland) Jari-Matti Latvala	Volkswagen Polo R WRC	8:48.6	(France) Sébastien Ogier
Leg 1 (31 July)	SS6	Dyfi 2	21.90 km	(France) Sébastien Ogier	Volkswagen Polo R WRC	12:51.7	(France) Sébastien Ogier
Leg 1 (31 July)	SS7	Hafren Sweet Lamb 2	23.55 km	(Finland) Jari-Matti Latvala	Volkswagen Polo R WRC	14:00.7	(France) Sébastien Ogier
Leg 1 (31 July)	SS8	Maesnant 2	12.86 km	(Finland) Jari-Matti Latvala	Volkswagen Polo R WRC	8:07.5	(France) Sébastien Ogier
Leg 2 (1 August)	SS9	Clocaenog East 1	8.25 km	(Norway) Andreas Mikkelsen	Volkswagen Polo R WRC	4:39.6	(France) Sébastien Ogier
Leg 2 (1 August)	SS10	Clocaenog Main 1	13.74 km	(Norway) Andreas Mikkelsen	Volkswagen Polo R WRC	8:07.8	(France) Sébastien Ogier
Leg 2 (1 August)	SS11	Aberhirnant 1	13.87 km	(Norway) Andreas Mikkelsen	Volkswagen Polo R WRC	7:28.8	(France) Sébastien Ogier
Leg 2 (1 August)	SS12	Dyfnant 1	19.98 km	(Norway) Andreas Mikkelsen	Volkswagen Polo R WRC	11:32.9	(France) Sébastien Ogier
Leg 2 (1 August)	SS13	Chirk Castle	2.06 km	(Norway) Henning Solberg	Ford Fiesta RS WRC	1:32.5	(France) Sébastien Ogier
Leg 2 (1 August)	SS14	Clocaenog East 2	8.25 km	(United Kingdom) Kris Meeke	Citroën DS3 WRC	4:44.8	(France) Sébastien Ogier
Leg 2 (1 August)	SS15	Clocaenog Main 2	13.74 km	(Finland) Mikko Hirvonen	Ford Fiesta RS WRC	8:11.2	(France) Sébastien Ogier
Leg 2 (1 August)	SS16	Aberhirnant 2	13.87 km	(Norway) Andreas Mikkelsen	Volkswagen Polo R WRC	7:48.2	(France) Sébastien Ogier
Leg 2 (1 August)	SS17	Dyfnant 2	19.98 km	(Finland) Jari-Matti Latvala	Volkswagen Polo R WRC	11:50.6	(France) Sébastien Ogier
Leg 3 (2 August)	SS18	Brenig 1	10.81 km	(Norway) Mads Østberg	Citroën DS3 WRC	7:07.6	(France) Sébastien Ogier
Leg 3 (2 August)	SS19	Alwen 1	10.04 km	(Norway) Mads Østberg	Citroën DS3 WRC	5:43.1	(France) Sébastien Ogier
Leg 3 (2 August)	SS20	Kinmel Park 1	2.21 km	(Finland) Jari-Matti Latvala	Volkswagen Polo R WRC	1:41.9	(France) Sébastien Ogier
Leg 3 (2 August)	SS21	Kinmel Park 2	2.21 km	(Finland) Jari-Matti Latvala	Volkswagen Polo R WRC	1:40.5	(France) Sébastien Ogier
Leg 3 (2 August)	SS22	Alwen 2	10.04 km	(Finland) Jari-Matti Latvala	Volkswagen Polo R WRC	5:44.7	(France) Sébastien Ogier
Leg 3 (2 August)	SS23	Brenig 2	10.81 km	(Finland) Jari-Matti Latvala	Volkswagen Polo R WRC	7:04.7	(France) Sébastien Ogier

=== Power Stage ===
The "Power Stage" was a 10.81 km (6.72 mi) stage at the end of the rally.

Pos	Driver	Car	Time	Diff.	Pts.
1	(Finland) Jari-Matti Latvala	Volkswagen Polo R WRC	7:04.7	0.0	3
2	(Belgium) Thierry Neuville	Hyundai i20 WRC	7:07.0	+2.3	2
3	(Norway) Mads Østberg	Citroën DS3 WRC	7:07.8	+3.1	1

== Standings after the rally ==
=== WRC ===
Drivers' Championship standings

Pos.	Driver	Points
1	(France) Sébastien Ogier	267
2	(Finland) Jari-Matti Latvala	218
3	(Norway) Andreas Mikkelsen	150
4	(Finland) Mikko Hirvonen	126
5	(Norway) Mads Østberg	108

Manufacturers' Championship standings

Pos.	Manufacturer	Points
1	(Germany) Volkswagen Motorsport	447
2	(France) Citroën Total Abu Dhabi WRT	210
3	(United Kingdom) M-Sport World Rally Team	208
4	(South Korea) Hyundai Shell World Rally Team	187
5	(Germany) Volkswagen Motorsport II	133

=== Other ===
WRC-2 Drivers' Championship standings

Pos.	Driver	Points
1	(Qatar) Nasser Al-Attiyah	118
2	(Finland) Jari Ketomaa	115
3	(Italy) Lorenzo Bertelli	103
4	(Ukraine) Yuriy Protasov	90
5	(Estonia) Karl Kruuda	90

WRC-3 Drivers' Championship standings

Pos.	Driver	Points
1	(France) Stéphane Lefebvre	79
2	(United Kingdom) Alastair Fisher	65
3	(Slovakia) Martin Koči	63
4	(France) Quentin Giordano	54
5	(Germany) Christian Riedemann	46

JWRC Drivers' Championship standings

Pos.	Driver	Points
1	(France) Stéphane Lefebvre	93
2	(United Kingdom) Alastair Fisher	92
3	(Slovakia) Martin Koči	76
4	(France) Quentin Giordano	72
5	(Germany) Christian Riedemann	46
