= 2014 Rally Finland =

Motor rally competition

2014 Rally Finland 64th Rally Finland
Round 8 of the 2014 World Rally Championship season
← Previous event	Next event →
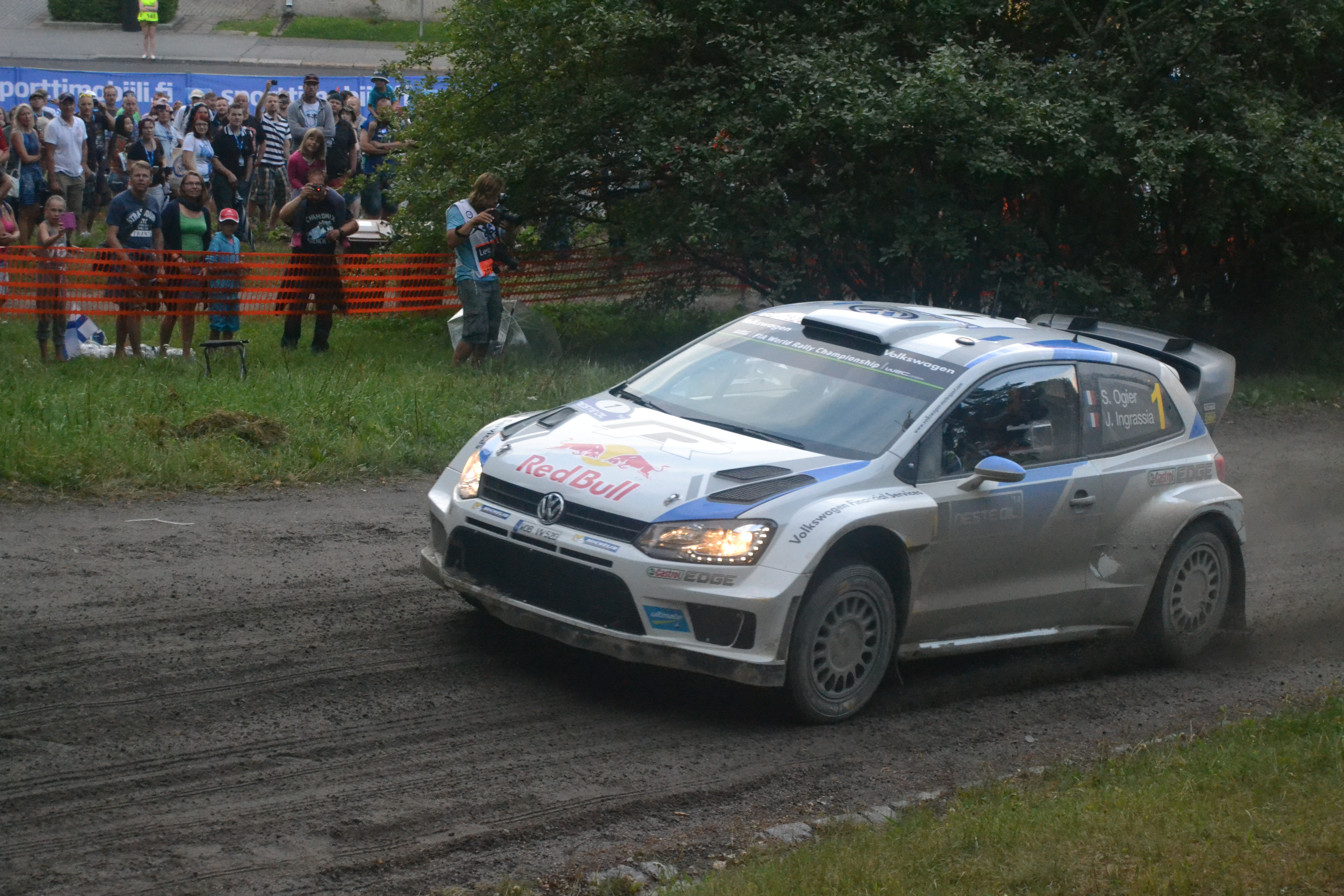
- Sébastien Ogier climbing up on the Harju special stage.
- Host country: Finland
- Rally base: Jyväskylä, Finland
- Dates run: July 31 – August 3, 2014
- Stages: 26 (360.94 km; 224.28 miles)
- Stage surface: Gravel

Statistics
- Crews: 77 at start, 54 at finish

Overall results
- Overall winner: (Finland) Jari-Matti Latvala (Finland) Miikka Anttila (Germany) Volkswagen Motorsport

The 2014 Neste Oil Rally Finland was the eighth round of the 2014 World Rally Championship season. The event was based in Jyväskylä, Finland, and started on 31 July and finished on 3 August after 26 special stages, totaling 360.9 competitive kilometres.

Finnish driver Jari-Matti Latvala won his home Rally Finland for the second time in his career, taking his third victory of the 2014 season.

== Entry list ==
Notable entrants
No.	Entrant	Class	Driver	Co-driver	Car	Tyre
1	(Germany) Volkswagen Motorsport	WRC	(France) Sébastien Ogier	(France) Julien Ingrassia	Volkswagen Polo R WRC	MI
2	(Germany) Volkswagen Motorsport	WRC	(Finland) Jari-Matti Latvala	(Finland) Miikka Anttila	Volkswagen Polo R WRC	MI
3	(France) Citroën Total Abu Dhabi WRT	WRC	(United Kingdom) Kris Meeke	(Republic of Ireland) Paul Nagle	Citroën DS3 WRC	MI
4	(France) Citroën Total Abu Dhabi WRT	WRC	(Norway) Mads Østberg	(Sweden) Jonas Andersson	Citroën DS3 WRC	MI
5	(United Kingdom) M-Sport World Rally Team	WRC	(Finland) Mikko Hirvonen	(Finland) Jarmo Lehtinen	Ford Fiesta RS WRC	MI
6	(United Kingdom) M-Sport World Rally Team	WRC	(United Kingdom) Elfyn Evans	(United Kingdom) Daniel Barritt	Ford Fiesta RS WRC	MI
7	(Germany) Hyundai Shell World Rally Team	WRC	(Belgium) Thierry Neuville	(Belgium) Nicolas Gilsoul	Hyundai i20 WRC	MI
8	(Germany) Hyundai Shell World Rally Team	WRC	(Finland) Juho Hänninen	(Finland) Tomi Tuominent	Hyundai i20 WRC	MI
9	(Germany) Volkswagen Motorsport II	WRC	(Norway) Andreas Mikkelsen	(Norway) Ola Fløene	Volkswagen Polo R WRC	MI
10	(United Kingdom) RK M-Sport World Rally Team	WRC	(Poland) Robert Kubica	(Poland) Maciek Szczepaniak	Ford Fiesta RS WRC	MI
19	(Norway) Henning Solberg	WRC	(Norway) Henning Solberg	(Austria) Ilka Minor	Ford Fiesta RS WRC	DM
20	(Germany) Hyundai Motorsport N	WRC	(New Zealand) Hayden Paddon	(New Zealand) John Kennard	Hyundai i20 WRC	MI
21	(Czech Republic) Jipocar Czech National Team	WRC	(Czech Republic) Martin Prokop	(Czech Republic) Jan Tománek	Ford Fiesta RS WRC	MI
22	(Finland) Jarkko Nikara	WRC	(Finland) Jarkko Nikara	(Finland) Jarkko Kalliolepo	Ford Fiesta RS WRC	P
23	(Republic of Ireland) Craig Breen	WRC	(Republic of Ireland) Craig Breen	(United Kingdom) Scott Martin	Ford Fiesta RS WRC	MI
24	(United Kingdom) M-Sport World Rally Team	WRC	(Poland) Michał Sołowow	(Poland) Maciek Baran	Ford Fiesta RS WRC	MI
31	(Saudi Arabia) Yazeed Racing	WRC-2	(Saudi Arabia) Yazeed Al-Rajhi	(United Kingdom) Michael Orr	Ford Fiesta RRC	MI
35	(United Kingdom) Drive Dmack	WRC-2	(Finland) Jari Ketomaa	(Finland) Kaj Lindström	Ford Fiesta R5	DM
36	(Estonia) Karl Kruuda	WRC-2	(Estonia) Karl Kruuda	(Estonia) Martin Järveoja	Ford Fiesta S2000	MI
38	(United Kingdom) Drive Dmack	WRC-2	(Estonia) Ott Tänak	(Estonia) Raigo Mőlder	Ford Fiesta R5	DM
39	(Ukraine) Eurolamp World Rally Team	WRC-2	(Ukraine) Valeriy Gorban	(Ukraine) Volodymyr Korsia	Mini John Cooper Works S2000	MI
40	(Belgium) Top Teams by MY Racing	WRC-2	(France) Sébastien Chardonnet	(France) Thibault de la Haye	Citroën DS3 R5	MI
42	(Norway) Eyvind Brynildsen	WRC-2	(Norway) Eyvind Brynildsen	(Sweden) Anders Fredriksson	Ford Fiesta RRC	DM
43	(Ukraine) Oleksiy Kikireshko	WRC-2	(Ukraine) Oleksiy Kikireshko	(Estonia) Kuldar Sikk	Ford Fiesta R5	DM
44	(Italy) BAS Motorsport Srl	WRC-2	(Italy) Mario Pizzuti	(Italy) Max Rendina	Mitsubishi Lancer Evo X	P
52	(Italy) Simone Tempestini	WRC-3; JWRC	(Italy) Simone Tempestini	(Romania) Dorin Pulpea	Citroën DS3 R3T	MI
53	(Poland) Aron Domzala	WRC-3; JWRC	(Poland) Aron Domzala	(Poland) Przemek Zawada	Citroën DS3 R3T	MI
55	(France) Quentin Giordano	WRC-3; JWRC	(France) Quentin Giordano	(France) Guillaume Duval	Citroën DS3 R3T	MI
56	(Slovakia) Styllex Slovak National Team	WRC-3; JWRC	(Slovakia) Martin Koči	(Czech Republic) Lukáš Kosta	Citroën DS3 R3T	MI
57	(France) Stéphane Lefebvre	WRC-3; JWRC	(France) Stéphane Lefebvre	(France) Thomas Dubois	Citroën DS3 R3T	MI
58	(Australia) Molly Taylor	WRC-3; JWRC	(Australia) Molly Taylor	(United Kingdom) Sebastian Marshall	Citroën DS3 R3T	MI
61	(Switzerland) Federico Della Casa	WRC-3; JWRC	(Switzerland) Federico Della Casa	(Italy) Domenico Pozzi	Citroën DS3 R3T	MI
62	(United Kingdom) Alastair Fisher	WRC-3; JWRC	(United Kingdom) Alastair Fisher	(United Kingdom) Gordon Noble	Citroën DS3 R3T	MI
63	(Austria) Wurmbrand Racing Team	WRC-3; JWRC	(Hungary) Kornél Lukács	(Hungary) Márk Mesterházi	Citroën DS3 R3T	MI
66	AKK Sports Team Finland	WRC-3	(Finland) Teemu Suninen	(Finland) Juha-Pekka Jauhiainen	Citroën DS3 R3T	DM
72	(Argentina) Juan Carlos Alonso	WRC-2	(Argentina) Juan Carlos Alonso	(Argentina) Juan Pablo Monasterolo	Mitsubishi Lancer Evo X	DM

Icon	Class
WRC	WRC entries eligible to score manufacturer points
WRC	Major entry ineligible to score manufacturer points
WRC-2	Registered to take part in WRC-2 championship
WRC-3	Registered to take part in WRC-3 championship
JWRC	Registered to take part in Junior World Rally championship

== Results ==
=== Event standings ===
Pos.	No.	Driver	Co-driver	Team	Car	Class	Time	Difference	Points
Overall classification
1	2	(Finland) Jari-Matti Latvala	(Finland) Miikka Anttila	(Germany) Volkswagen Motorsport	Volkswagen Polo R WRC	WRC	2:57:23.2	0.0	27
2	1	(France) Sébastien Ogier	(France) Julien Ingrassia	(Germany) Volkswagen Motorsport	Volkswagen Polo R WRC	WRC	2:57:26.8	+3.6	21
3	3	(United Kingdom) Kris Meeke	(Republic of Ireland) Paul Nagle	(France) Citroën Total Abu Dhabi WRT	Citroën DS3 WRC	WRC	2:58:13.8	+50.6	16
4	9	(Norway) Andreas Mikkelsen	(Norway) Ola Fløene	(Germany) Volkswagen Motorsport II	Volkswagen Polo R WRC	WRC	2:59:15.7	+1:52.5	12
5	5	(Finland) Mikko Hirvonen	(Finland) Jarmo Lehtinen	(United Kingdom) M-Sport World Rally Team	Ford Fiesta RS WRC	WRC	3:00:12.9	+2:49.7	10
6	8	(Finland) Juho Hänninen	(Finland) Tomi Tuominen	(Germany) Hyundai Shell World Rally Team	Hyundai i20 WRC	WRC	3:01:52.2	+4:29.0	8
7	6	(United Kingdom) Elfyn Evans	(United Kingdom) Daniel Barritt	(United Kingdom) M-Sport World Rally Team	Ford Fiesta RS WRC	WRC	3:02:49.0	+5:25.8	6
8	20	(New Zealand) Hayden Paddon	(New Zealand) John Kennard	(Germany) Hyundai Motorsport N	Hyundai i20 WRC	WRC	3:03:41.0	+6:17.8	4
9	19	(Norway) Henning Solberg	(Austria) Ilka Minor	(Norway) Henning Solberg	Ford Fiesta RS WRC	WRC	3:09:30.2	+12:07.0	2
10	36	(Estonia) Karl Kruuda	(Estonia) Martin Järveoja	(Estonia) Karl Kruuda	Ford Fiesta S2000	WRC-2	3:12:07.9	+14:44.7	1
WRC-2 standings
1 (10.)	36	(Estonia) Karl Kruuda	(Estonia) Martin Järveoja	(Estonia) Karl Kruuda	Ford Fiesta S2000	WRC-2	3:12:07.9	0.0	25
2 (11.)	35	(Finland) Jari Ketomaa	(Finland) Kaj Lindström	(United Kingdom) Drive Dmack	Ford Fiesta R5	WRC-2	3:14:16.6	+2:08.7	18
3 (12.)	38	(Estonia) Ott Tänak	(Estonia) Raigo Mõlder	(United Kingdom) Drive Dmack	Ford Fiesta RRC	WRC-2	3:14:40.1	+2:32.2	15
4 (13.)	31	(Saudi Arabia) Yazeed Al Rajhi	(United Kingdom) Michael Orr	(Saudi Arabia) Yazeed Racing	Ford Fiesta RRC	WRC-2	3:16:41.1	+4:33.2	12
5 (14.)	42	(Norway) Eyvind Brynildsen	(Sweden) Anders Fredriksson	(Norway) Eyvind Brynildsen	Ford Fiesta RRC	WRC-2	3:19:04.5	+6:56.6	10
6 (26.)	72	(Argentina) Juan Carlos Alonso	(Argentina) Juano Pablo Monasterolo	(Argentina) Juan Carlos Alonso	Mitsubishi Lancer Evo X	WRC-2	3:37:41.0	+25:33.1	8
7 (31.)	39	(Ukraine) Valeriy Gorban	(Ukraine) Volodymyr Korsia	(Ukraine) Eurolamp World Rally Team	Mini John Cooper Works S2000	WRC-2	3:45:52.4	+33:44.5	6
WRC-3 standings
1 (17.)	66	(Finland) Teemu Suninen	(Finland) Juha-Pekka Jauhiainen	AKK Sports Team Finland	Citroën DS3 R3T	WRC-3	3:31:27.8	0.0	25
2 (19.)	56	(Slovakia) Martin Koči	(Czech Republic) Lukáš Kostka	Styllex Slovakia National Team	Citroën DS3 R3T	WRC-3	3:31:59.0	+31.9	18
3 (22.)	55	(France) Quentin Giordano	(France) Guillaume Duval	(France) Quentin Giordano	Citroën DS3 R3T	WRC-3	3:33:19.8	+1:52.0	15
4 (35.)	58	(Australia) Molly Taylor	(United Kingdom) Sebastian Marshall	(Australia) Molly Taylor	Citroën DS3 R3T	WRC-3	3:47:15.7	+15:47.9	12
5 (36.)	62	(United Kingdom) Alastair Fisher	(United Kingdom) Gordon Noble	(United Kingdom) Alastair Fisher	Citroën DS3 R3T	WRC-3	3:47:50.1	+16:22.3	10
6 (38.)	52	(Italy) Simone Tempestini	(Romania) Dorin Pulpea	(Italy) Simone Tempestini	Citroën DS3 R3T	WRC-3	3:49:15.0	+17:47.2	8
7 (40.)	53	(Poland) Aron Domzala	(Poland) Przemek Zawada	(Poland) Aron Domzala	Citroën DS3 R3T	WRC-3	3:51:48.9	+20:21.1	6
8 (45.)	57	(France) Stéphane Lefebvre	(France) Thomas Dubois	(France) Stéphane Lefebvre	Citroën DS3 R3T	WRC-3	4:06:02.1	+34:34.3	4
9 (50.)	61	(Switzerland) Federico Della Casa	(Italy) Domenico Pozzi	(Switzerland) Federico Della Casa	Citroën DS3 R3T	WRC-3	4:18:26.3	+46:58.5	2
JWRC standings
1 (19.)	56	(Slovakia) Martin Koči	(Czech Republic) Lukáš Kostka	Styllex Slovakia National Team	Citroën DS3 R3T	JWRC	3:31:59.0	0.0	25
2 (22.)	55	(France) Quentin Giordano	(France) Guillaume Duval	(France) Quentin Giordano	Citroën DS3 R3T	JWRC	3:33:19.8	+1:20.1	18
3 (35.)	58	(Australia) Molly Taylor	(United Kingdom) Sebastian Marshall	(Australia) Molly Taylor	Citroën DS3 R3T	JWRC	3:47:15.7	+15:16.0	15
4 (36.)	62	(United Kingdom) Alastair Fisher	(United Kingdom) Gordon Noble	(United Kingdom) Alastair Fisher	Citroën DS3 R3T	JWRC	3:47:50.1	+15:50.4	12
5 (38.)	52	(Italy) Simone Tempestini	(Romania) Dorin Pulpea	(Italy) Simone Tempestini	Citroën DS3 R3T	JWRC	3:49:15.0	+17:15.3	10
6 (40.)	53	(Poland) Aron Domzala	(Poland) Przemek Zawada	(Poland) Aron Domzala	Citroën DS3 R3T	JWRC	3:51:48.9	+19:49.2	8
7 (45.)	57	(France) Stéphane Lefebvre	(France) Thomas Dubois	(France) Stéphane Lefebvre	Citroën DS3 R3T	JWRC	4:06:02.1	+34:02.4	6
8 (50.)	61	(Switzerland) Federico Della Casa	(Italy) Domenico Pozzi	(Switzerland) Federico Della Casa	Citroën DS3 R3T	JWRC	4:18:26.3	+46:26.6	4

=== Special stages ===
Day	Stage	Name	Length	Winner	Car	Time	Rally leader
Leg 1 (31 July)	SS1	Lankamaa 1	23.44 km	(Finland) Jari-Matti Latvala	Volkswagen Polo R WRC	11:17.3	(Finland) Jari-Matti Latvala
Leg 1 (31 July)	SS2	Jouhtikylä	10.36 km	(Finland) Jari-Matti Latvala	Volkswagen Polo R WRC	5:02.5	(Finland) Jari-Matti Latvala
Leg 1 (31 July)	SS3	Lankamaa 2	23.44 km	(France) Sébastien Ogier (Finland) Jari-Matti Latvala	Volkswagen Polo R WRC	11:11.2	(Finland) Jari-Matti Latvala
Leg 1 (31 July)	SS4	Harju 1	2.27 km	(France) Sébastien Ogier	Volkswagen Polo R WRC	1:46.1	(Finland) Jari-Matti Latvala
Leg 1 (1 Aug)	SS5	Pihlajakoski 1	14.51 km	(Finland) Jari-Matti Latvala	Volkswagen Polo R WRC	6:45.9	(Finland) Jari-Matti Latvala
Leg 1 (1 Aug)	SS6	Päijälä 1	23.38 km	(Finland) Jari-Matti Latvala	Volkswagen Polo R WRC	10:52.3	(Finland) Jari-Matti Latvala
Leg 1 (1 Aug)	SS7	Kakaristo 1	20.51 km	(United Kingdom) Kris Meeke	Citroën DS3 WRC	10:37.0	(Finland) Jari-Matti Latvala
Leg 1 (1 Aug)	SS8	Painaa 1	7.70 km	(France) Sébastien Ogier	Volkswagen Polo R WRC	3:51.3	(Finland) Jari-Matti Latvala
Leg 1 (1 Aug)	SS9	Pihlajakoski 2	14.51 km	(France) Sébastien Ogier	Volkswagen Polo R WRC	6:39.8	(Finland) Jari-Matti Latvala
Leg 1 (1 Aug)	SS10	Päijälä 2	23.38 km	(Finland) Jari-Matti Latvala	Volkswagen Polo R WRC	10:38.3	(Finland) Jari-Matti Latvala
Leg 1 (1 Aug)	SS11	Kakaristo 2	20.51 km	(Finland) Jari-Matti Latvala	Volkswagen Polo R WRC	10:22.1	(Finland) Jari-Matti Latvala
Leg 1 (1 Aug)	SS12	Painaa 2	7.70 km	(Finland) Jari-Matti Latvala	Volkswagen Polo R WRC	3:48.5	(Finland) Jari-Matti Latvala
Leg 1 (1 Aug)	SS13	Harju 2	2.27 km	(France) Sébastien Ogier	Volkswagen Polo R WRC	1:46.3	(Finland) Jari-Matti Latvala
Leg 2 (2 Aug)	SS14	Mökkiperä 1	13.84 km	(Finland) Jari-Matti Latvala	Volkswagen Polo R WRC	6:44.8	(Finland) Jari-Matti Latvala
Leg 2 (2 Aug)	SS15	Jukojärvi 1	21.93 km	(Finland) Jari-Matti Latvala	Volkswagen Polo R WRC	10:15.3	(Finland) Jari-Matti Latvala
Leg 2 (2 Aug)	SS16	Surkee 1	14.95 km	(Finland) Jari-Matti Latvala	Volkswagen Polo R WRC	7:58.9	(Finland) Jari-Matti Latvala
Leg 2 (2 Aug)	SS17	Himos 1	4.45 km	(France) Sébastien Ogier	Volkswagen Polo R WRC	2:37.6	(Finland) Jari-Matti Latvala
Leg 2 (2 Aug)	SS18	Leustu 1	10.01 km	(Finland) Jari-Matti Latvala	Volkswagen Polo R WRC	5:15.9	(Finland) Jari-Matti Latvala
Leg 2 (2 Aug)	SS19	Mökkiperä 2	13.84 km	(Finland) Jari-Matti Latvala	Volkswagen Polo R WRC	6:40.7	(Finland) Jari-Matti Latvala
Leg 2 (2 Aug)	SS20	Jukojärvi 2	21.93 km	(France) Sébastien Ogier	Volkswagen Polo R WRC	10:09.4	(Finland) Jari-Matti Latvala
Leg 2 (2 Aug)	SS21	Surkee 2	14.95 km	(France) Sébastien Ogier	Volkswagen Polo R WRC	7:53.4	(Finland) Jari-Matti Latvala
Leg 2 (2 Aug)	SS22	Himos 2	4.45 km	(France) Sébastien Ogier	Volkswagen Polo R WRC	2:35.4	(Finland) Jari-Matti Latvala
Leg 2 (2 Aug)	SS23	Leustu 2	10.01 km	(France) Sébastien Ogier	Volkswagen Polo R WRC	5:11.3	(Finland) Jari-Matti Latvala
Leg 3 (3 Aug)	SS24	Ruuhimäki 1	6.79 km	(Finland) Jari-Matti Latvala	Volkswagen Polo R WRC	3:16.7	(Finland) Jari-Matti Latvala
Leg 3 (3 Aug)	SS25	Myhinpää	23.02 km	(France) Sébastien Ogier	Volkswagen Polo R WRC	10:15.5	(Finland) Jari-Matti Latvala
Leg 3 (3 Aug)	SS24	Ruuhimäki 2 {Power Stage)	6.79 km	(France) Sébastien Ogier	Volkswagen Polo R WRC	3:16.0	(Finland) Jari-Matti Latvala

=== Power Stage ===
The "Power stage" was a 6.79 km (4.22 mi) stage at the end of the rally.

Pos	Driver	Car	Time	Diff.	Pts
1	(France) Sébastien Ogier	Volkswagen Polo R WRC	3:16.0	0.0	3
2	(Finland) Jari-Matti Latvala	Volkswagen Polo R WRC	3:16.1	+0.1	2
3	(United Kingdom) Kris Meeke	Citroën DS3 WRC	3:18.1	+2.1	1

== Standings after the rally ==
=== WRC ===
Drivers' Championship standings

Pos.	Driver	Points
1	(France) Sebastien Ogier	187
2	(Finland) Jari-Matti Latvala	143
3	(Norway) Andreas Mikkelsen	95
4	(Norway) Mads Ostberg	66
5	(Finland) Mikko Hirvonen	62

Manufacturers' Championship standings

Pos.	Manufacturer	Points
1	(Germany) Volkswagen Motorsport	305
2	(France) Citroën Total Abu Dhabi WRT	130
3	(United Kingdom) M-Sport World Rally Team	106
4	(Germany) Volkswagen Motorsport II	94
5	(Germany) Hyundai Shell World Rally Team	88

=== Other ===
WRC2 Drivers' Championship standings

Pos.	Driver	Points
1	(Italy) Lorenzo Bertelli	81
2	(Ukraine) Yuriy Protasov	75
3	(Estonia) Karl Kruuda	74
4	(Finland) Jari Ketomaa	72
5	(Estonia) Ott Tänak	60

WRC3 Drivers' Championship standings

Pos.	Driver	Points
1	(France) Stéphane Lefebvre	54
2	(Slovakia) Martin Koči	45
3	(France) Quentin Giordano	31
4	(United Kingdom) Alastair Fisher	28
5	(Germany) Christian Riedemann	28

Junior WRC Drivers' Championship standings

Pos.	Driver	Points
1	(France) Stéphane Lefebvre	56
2	(Slovakia) Martin Koči	52
3	(France) Quentin Giordano	34
4	(United Kingdom) Alastair Fisher	30
5	(Germany) Christian Riedemann	28
