= 2014 Rallye Deutschland =

Motor rally competition

2014 ADAC Rallye Deutschland: 32. Rallye Deutschland
Round 9 of the 2014 World Rally Championship season
← Previous event	Next event →
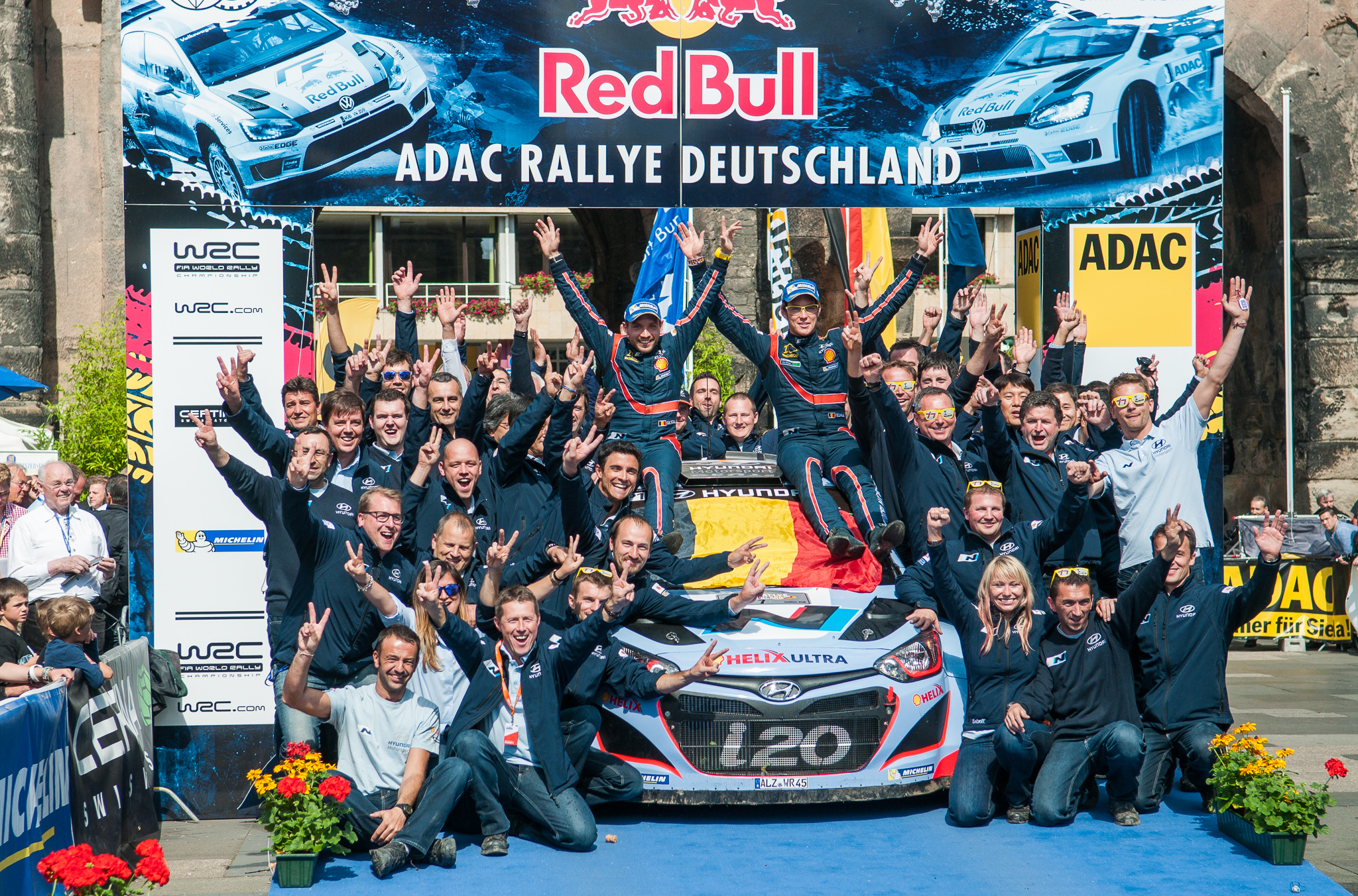
- Thierry Neuville during Podium
- Host country: Germany
- Rally base: Trier, Germany
- Dates run: August 22 – August 24, 2014
- Stages: 18 (324.31 km; 201.52 miles)
- Stage surface: Tarmac

Statistics
- Crews: 85 at start, 63 at finish

Overall results
- Overall winner: (Belgium) Thierry Neuville (Belgium) Nicolas Gilsoul (Germany) Hyundai Shell World Rally Team

The 2014 ADAC Rallye Deutschland was the ninth round of the 2014 World Rally Championship season. The event was based in Trier, Germany, and started on 22 August and finished on 24 August after eighteen special stages, totaling 324.3 competitive kilometres.

Hyundai driver Thierry Neuville earned his first ever World Rally Championship victory of his career. It was also the first rally of the season not to be won by either the Volkswagen of Sébastien Ogier or Jari-Matti Latvala as they had both crashed out during the event. It was the first non-VW victory since the previous year's German Rally won by Citroën's Dani Sordo, ending VW's streak of twelve consecutive WRC rally victories dating back to the 2013 Rally Australia. It was also Hyundai World Rally Team's first victory in the WRC having returned to the sport in 2014 after an eleven-year absence. Neuville became only the second Belgian rally driver to win a WRC event; the other being François Duval when he won the 2005 Rally Australia.

== Entry list ==
Notable entrants
No.	Entrant	Class	Driver	Co-driver	Car	Tyre
1	(Germany) Volkswagen Motorsport	WRC	(France) Sébastien Ogier	(France) Julien Ingrassia	Volkswagen Polo R WRC	M
2	(Germany) Volkswagen Motorsport	WRC	(Finland) Jari-Matti Latvala	(Finland) Miikka Anttila	Volkswagen Polo R WRC	M
3	(France) Citroën Total Abu Dhabi WRT	WRC	(United Kingdom) Kris Meeke	(Republic of Ireland) Paul Nagle	Citroën DS3 WRC	M
4	(France) Citroën Total Abu Dhabi WRT	WRC	(Norway) Mads Østberg	(Sweden) Jonas Andersson	Citroën DS3 WRC	M
5	(United Kingdom) M-Sport World Rally Team	WRC	(Finland) Mikko Hirvonen	(Finland) Jarmo Lehtinen	Ford Fiesta RS WRC	M
6	(United Kingdom) M-Sport World Rally Team	WRC	(United Kingdom) Elfyn Evans	(United Kingdom) Daniel Barritt	Ford Fiesta RS WRC	M
7	(Germany) Hyundai Shell World Rally Team	WRC	(Belgium) Thierry Neuville	(Belgium) Nicolas Gilsoul	Hyundai i20 WRC	M
8	(Germany) Hyundai Shell World Rally Team	WRC	(Spain) Dani Sordo	(Spain) Marc Martí	Hyundai i20 WRC	M
9	(Germany) Volkswagen Motorsport II	WRC	(Norway) Andreas Mikkelsen	(Norway) Ola Fløene	Volkswagen Polo R WRC	M
10	(United Kingdom) RK M-Sport World Rally Team	WRC	(Poland) Robert Kubica	(Poland) Maciek Szczepaniak	Ford Fiesta RS WRC	M
11	(United Kingdom) M-Sport World Rally Team	WRC	(Netherlands) Dennis Kuipers	(Belgium) Robin Buysmans	Ford Fiesta RS WRC	M
12	(United Kingdom) M-Sport World Rally Team	WRC	(Ukraine) Yuriy Protasov	(Ukraine) Pavlo Cherepin	Ford Fiesta RS WRC	M
20	(Germany) Hyundai Motorsport N	WRC	(France) Bryan Bouffier	(France) Xavier Panseri	Hyundai i20 WRC	M
21	(Czech Republic) Jipocar Czech National Team	WRC	(Czech Republic) Martin Prokop	(Czech Republic) Jan Tománek	Ford Fiesta RS WRC	M
22	Slovakia World Rally Team	WRC	(Slovakia) Jaroslav Melichárek	(Slovakia) Erik Melichárek	Ford Fiesta RS WRC	P
23	(Republic of Ireland) Sam Moffett	WRC	(Republic of Ireland) Sam Moffett	(Republic of Ireland) James O'Reilly	Ford Fiesta RS WRC	P
31	(Qatar) Nasser Al-Attiyah	WRC-2	(Qatar) Nasser Al-Attiyah	(Italy) Giovanni Bernacchini	Ford Fiesta RRC	M
32	(United Kingdom) Drive Dmack	WRC-2	(Estonia) Ott Tänak	(Estonia) Raigo Mőlder	Ford Fiesta R5	D
33	(Portugal) Bernardo Sousa	WRC-2	(Portugal) Bernardo Sousa	(Portugal) Hugo Magalhães	Ford Fiesta RRC	P
34	(Belgium) Top Teams by MY Racing	WRC-2	(France) Sébastien Chardonnet	(France) Thibault de la Haye	Citroën DS3 R5	M
35	(Sweden) Pontus Tidemand	WRC-2	(Sweden) Pontus Tidemand	(Sweden) Emil Axelsson	Ford Fiesta R5	M
36	(Germany) Armin Kremer	WRC-2	(Germany) Armin Kremer	(Germany) Klaus Wicha	Škoda Fabia S2000	P
38	(United Arab Emirates) Skydive Dubai Rally Team	WRC-2	(United Arab Emirates) Rashid Al Ketbi	(Germany) Karina Hepperle	Ford Fiesta R5	D
39	(France) Julien Maurin	WRC-2	(France) Julien Maurin	(France) Nicolas Klinger	Ford Fiesta R5	P
49	(United Kingdom) Martin McCormack	WRC-2	(United Kingdom) Martin McCormack	(United Kingdom) Phil Clarke	Ford Fiesta R5	H
52	(Italy) Simone Tempestini	WRC-3; JWRC	(Italy) Simone Tempestini	(Romania) Dorin Pulpea	Citroën DS3 R3T	M
54	(Germany) ADAC Weser-Ems	WRC-3; JWRC	(Germany) Christian Riedemann	(Belgium) Michael Wenzel	Citroën DS3 R3T	M
55	(France) Quentin Giordano	WRC-3; JWRC	(France) Quentin Giordano	(France) Thomas Roux	Citroën DS3 R3T	M
56	(Slovakia) Styllex Slovak National Team	WRC-3; JWRC	(Slovakia) Martin Koči	(Czech Republic) Lukáš Kosta	Citroën DS3 R3T	M
57	(France) Stéphane Lefebvre	WRC-3; JWRC	(France) Stéphane Lefebvre	(France) Thomas Dubois	Citroën DS3 R3T	M
61	(Switzerland) Federico Della Casa	WRC-3; JWRC	(Switzerland) Federico Della Casa	(Italy) Domenico Pozzi	Citroën DS3 R3T	M
62	(United Kingdom) Alastair Fisher	WRC-3; JWRC	(United Kingdom) Alastair Fisher	(United Kingdom) Gordon Noble	Citroën DS3 R3T	M
63	(Austria) Wurmbrand Racing Team	WRC-3; JWRC	(Hungary) Kornél Lukács	(Hungary) Márk Mesterházi	Citroën DS3 R3T	M
67	(United Arab Emirates) Abu Dhabi Racing	WRC-3; JWRC	(United Arab Emirates) Mohammed Al Mutawaa	(United Kingdom) Stephen McAuley	Citroën DS3 R3T	M
68	(France) Eric Camilli	WRC-3; JWRC	(France) Eric Camilli	(France) Maxime Vilmot	Citroën DS3 R3T	M

Icon	Class
WRC	WRC entries eligible to score manufacturer points
WRC	Major entry ineligible to score manufacturer points
WRC-2	Registered to take part in WRC-2 championship
WRC-3	Registered to take part in WRC-3 championship
JWRC	Registered to take part in Junior World Rally championship

== Results ==
=== Event standings ===
Pos.	No.	Driver	Co-driver	Team	Car	Class	Time	Difference	Points
Overall classification
1	7	(Belgium) Thierry Neuville	(Belgium) Nicolas Gilsoul	(Germany) Hyundai Shell World Rally Team	Hyundai i20 WRC	WRC	3:07:20.2	0.0	27
2	8	(Spain) Dani Sordo	(Spain) Marc Martí	(Germany) Hyundai Shell World Rally Team	Hyundai i20 WRC	WRC	3:08:00.9	+40.7	18
3	9	(Norway) Andreas Mikkelsen	(Norway) Ola Fløene	(Germany) Volkswagen Motorsport II	Volkswagen Polo R WRC	WRC	3:08:18.2	+58.0	15
4	6	(United Kingdom) Elfyn Evans	(United Kingdom) Daniel Barritt	(United Kingdom) M-Sport World Rally Team	Ford Fiesta RS WRC	WRC	3:08:23.8	+1:03.6	15
5	5	(Finland) Mikko Hirvonen	(Finland) Jarmo Lehtinen	(United Kingdom) M-Sport World Rally Team	Ford Fiesta RS WRC	WRC	3:08:30.7	+1:10.5	11
6	4	(Norway) Mads Østberg	(Sweden) Jonas Andersson	(France) Citroën Total Abu Dhabi WRT	Citroën DS3 WRC	WRC	3:08:42.9	+1:22.7	8
7	21	(Czech Republic) Martin Prokop	(Czech Republic) Jan Tománek	(Czech Republic) Jipocar Czech National Team	Ford Fiesta RS WRC	WRC	3:12:13.0	+4:52.8	6
8	11	(Netherlands) Dennis Kuipers	(Belgium) Robin Buysmans	(United Kingdom) M-Sport World Rally Team	Ford Fiesta RS WRC	WRC	3:16:38.3	+9:18.0	4
9	35	(Sweden) Pontus Tidemand	(Sweden) Emil Axelsson	(Sweden) Pontus Tidemand	Ford Fiesta R5	WRC-2	3:18:55.6	+11:35.4	2
10	32	(Estonia) Ott Tänak	(Estonia) Raigo Mõlder	(United Kingdom) Drive Dmack	Ford Fiesta R5	WRC-2	3:18:57.4	+11:37.2	1
WRC-2 standings
1 (9.)	35	(Sweden) Pontus Tidemand	(Sweden) Emil Axelsson	(Sweden) Pontus Tidemand	Ford Fiesta R5	WRC-2	3:18:55.6	0.0	25
2 (10.)	32	(Estonia) Ott Tänak	(Estonia) Raigo Mõlder	(United Kingdom) Drive Dmack	Ford Fiesta R5	WRC-2	3:18:57.4	+1.8	18
3 (13.)	36	(Germany) Armin Kremer	(Germany) Klaus Wicha	(Germany) Armin Kremer	Škoda Fabia S2000	WRC-2	3:20:00.8	+1:05.2	15
4 (16.)	39	(France) Julien Maurin	(France) Nicolas Klinger	(France) Julien Maurin	Ford Fiesta R5	WRC-2	3:21:36.6	+2:41.0	12
5 (17.)	31	(Qatar) Nasser Al-Attiyah	(Italy) Giovanni Bernacchini	(Qatar) Nasser Al-Attiyah	Ford Fiesta RRC	WRC-2	3:25:31.2	+6:35.6	10
6 (23.)	38	(United Arab Emirates) Rashid Al Ketbi	(Germany) Karina Hepperle	(United Arab Emirates) Skydive Dubai Rally Team	Ford Fiesta R5	WRC-2	3:34:56.9	+16:01.3	8
7 (56.)	49	(United Kingdom) Martin McCormack	(United Kingdom) Phil Clarke	(United Kingdom) Martin McCormack	Ford Fiesta R5	WRC-2	4:09:07.8	+50:12.2	6
WRC-3/JWRC standings
1 (19.)	57	(France) Stéphane Lefebvre	(France) Thomas Dubois	(France) Stéphane Lefebvre	Citroën DS3 R3T	WRC-3; JWRC	3:27:45.4	0.0	25
2 (20.)	54	(Germany) Christian Riedemann	(Belgium) Michael Wenzel	(Germany) ADAC Weser-Ems	Citroën DS3 R3T	WRC-3; JWRC	3:27:54.8	+9.4	18
3 (21.)	55	(France) Quentin Giordano	(France) Thomas Roux	(France) Quentin Giordano	Citroën DS3 R3T	WRC-3; JWRC	3:33:21.5	+5:36.1	15
4 (22.)	62	(United Kingdom) Alastair Fisher	(United Kingdom) Gordon Noble	(United Kingdom) Alastair Fisher	Citroën DS3 R3T	WRC-3; JWRC	3:33:49.3	+6:03.9	12
5 (26.)	52	(Italy) Simone Tempestini	(Romania) Dorin Pulpea	(Italy) Simone Tempestini	Citroën DS3 R3T	WRC-3; JWRC	3:38:32.1	+10:46.7	10
6 (28.)	63	(Hungary) Kornél Lukács	(Hungary) Márk Mesterházi	(Austria) Wurmbrand Racing Team	Citroën DS3 R3T	WRC-3; JWRC	3:39:37.4	+11:52.0	8

=== Special stages ===
Day	Stage	Name	Length	Winner	Car	Time	Rally leader
Leg 1 (22 Aug)	SS1	Sauertal 1	14.14 km	(France) Sébastien Ogier	Volkswagen Polo R WRC	7:18.9	(France) Sébastien Ogier
Leg 1 (22 Aug)	SS2	Waxweiler 1	16.40 km	(France) Sébastien Ogier	Volkswagen Polo R WRC	9:39.9	(France) Sébastien Ogier
Leg 1 (22 Aug)	SS3	Moselland 1	21.02 km	(Finland) Jari-Matti Latvala	Volkswagen Polo R WRC	12:48.1	(France) Sébastien Ogier
Leg 1 (22 Aug)	SS4	Sauertal 2	14.14 km	(France) Sébastien Ogier	Volkswagen Polo R WRC	7:17.0	(France) Sébastien Ogier
Leg 1 (22 Aug)	SS5	Waxweiler 2	16.40 km	(Finland) Jari-Matti Latvala	Volkswagen Polo R WRC	9:41.2	(France) Sébastien Ogier
Leg 1 (22 Aug)	SS6	Moselland 2	21.02 km	(Finland) Jari-Matti Latvala	Volkswagen Polo R WRC	12:45.8	(Finland) Jari-Matti Latvala
Leg 2 (23 Aug)	SS7	Stein & Wein 1	17.53 km	(Poland) Robert Kubica	Ford Fiesta RS WRC	10:21.8	(Finland) Jari-Matti Latvala
Leg 2 (23 Aug)	SS8	Peterberg 1	9.37 km	Stage Cancelled			(Finland) Jari-Matti Latvala
Leg 2 (23 Aug)	SS9	Arena Panzerplatte 1	3.03 km	(Finland) Jari-Matti Latvala	Volkswagen Polo R WRC	2:01.9	(Finland) Jari-Matti Latvala
Leg 2 (23 Aug)	SS10	Panzerplatte Lang 1	42.51 km	(Finland) Jari-Matti Latvala	Volkswagen Polo R WRC	24:40.2	(Finland) Jari-Matti Latvala
Leg 2 (23 Aug)	SS11	Stein & Wein 2	17.53 km	(Finland) Jari-Matti Latvala	Volkswagen Polo R WRC	9:59.1	(Finland) Jari-Matti Latvala
Leg 2 (23 Aug)	SS12	Peterberg 2	9.37 km	(Poland) Robert Kubica	Ford Fiesta RS WRC	5:15.8	(Finland) Jari-Matti Latvala
Leg 2 (23 Aug)	SS13	Arena Panzerplatte 2	3.03 km	(Finland) Jari-Matti Latvala	Volkswagen Polo R WRC	2:04.7	(Finland) Jari-Matti Latvala
Leg 2 (23 Aug)	SS14	Panzerplatte Lang 2	42.51 km	(Finland) Jari-Matti Latvala	Volkswagen Polo R WRC	24:47.8	(Finland) Jari-Matti Latvala
Leg 3 (24 Aug)	SS15	Dhrontal 1	18.03 km	(United Kingdom) Kris Meeke	Citroën DS3 WRC	11:46.4	(United Kingdom) Kris Meeke
Leg 3 (24 Aug)	SS16	Grafschaft 1	19.27 km	(Belgium) Thierry Neuville	Hyundai i20 WRC	12:00.3	(Belgium) Thierry Neuville
Leg 3 (24 Aug)	SS17	Dhrontal 2	18.03 km	(Finland) Mikko Hirvonen	Ford Fiesta RS WRC	11:36.4	(Belgium) Thierry Neuville
Leg 3 (24 Aug)	SS18	Grafschaft 2 (Power Stage)	19.27 km	(United Kingdom) Elfyn Evans	Ford Fiesta RS WRC	11:45.7	(Belgium) Thierry Neuville

=== Power Stage ===
The "Power stage" was a 19.27 km (11.97 mi) stage at the end of the rally.

Pos	Driver	Car	Time	Diff.	Pts
1	(United Kingdom) Elfyn Evans	Ford Fiesta RS WRC	11:45.7	0.0	3
2	(Belgium) Thierry Neuville	Hyundai i20 WRC	11:46.6	+0.9	2
3	(Finland) Mikko Hirvonen	Ford Fiesta RS WRC	11:47.7	+2.0	1

== Standings after the rally ==
=== WRC ===
Drivers' Championship standings

Pos.	Driver	Points
1	(France) Sebastien Ogier	187
2	(Finland) Jari-Matti Latvala	143
3	(Norway) Andreas Mikkelsen	110
4	(Norway) Mads Østberg	74
5	(Belgium) Thierry Neuville	73

Manufacturers' Championship standings

Pos.	Manufacturer	Points
1	(Germany) Volkswagen Motorsport	305
2	(France) Citroën Total Abu Dhabi WRT	138
3	(Germany) Hyundai Shell World Rally Team	131
4	(United Kingdom) M-Sport World Rally Team	128
5	(Germany) Volkswagen Motorsport II	109

=== Other ===
WRC2 Drivers' Championship standings

Pos.	Driver	Points
1	(Italy) Lorenzo Bertelli	81
2	(Estonia) Ott Tänak	78
3	(Ukraine) Yuriy Protasov	75
4	(Estonia) Karl Kruuda	74
5	(Finland) Jari Ketomaa	72

WRC3 Drivers' Championship standings

Pos.	Driver	Points
1	(France) Stéphane Lefebvre	79
2	(Germany) Christian Riedemann	46
3	(France) Quentin Giordano	46
4	(Slovakia) Martin Koči	45
5	(United Kingdom) Alastair Fisher	40

Junior WRC Drivers' Championship standings

Pos.	Driver	Points
1	(France) Stéphane Lefebvre	81
2	(Slovakia) Martin Koči	52
3	(France) Quentin Giordano	49
4	(Germany) Christian Riedemann	46
5	(United Kingdom) Alastair Fisher	42
