= Weser-Ems =

Coordinates: 53.04105°N 8.88019°E

- Regierungsbezirk
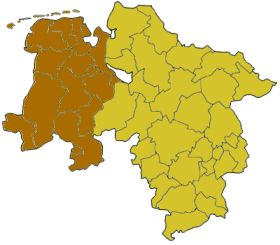
- Map of Lower Saxony highlighting Weser-Ems
- Country: Germany
- State: Lower Saxony
- Disestablished: 2004-12-31
- Region seat: Oldenburg

Area
  - Total: 14,965.38 km^{2} (5,778.17 sq mi)

Population (30 Sep. 2004)
  - Total: 2,473,998
  - Density: 165.3147/km^{2} (428.1632/sq mi)

GDP
  - Total: €120.883 billion (2024)
  - Per capita: €47,054 (2024)

The Regierungsbezirk Weser-Ems was the most westerly of the four administrative regions of Lower Saxony, Germany, bordering on the Dutch provinces of Groningen, Drenthe and Overijssel. It was established in 1978 by merging the former regions Osnabrück, Aurich, and Oldenburg. It was formally dissolved by the end of 2004 along with the other Regierungsbezirke of Lower Saxony as part of an effort to optimize the administrative system of the state.

The administrative centre of the Regierungsbezirk Weser-Ems was located in the Staatsministerium building in Oldenburg, a representative governmental complex from the period of the Grand Duchy and later Free State of Oldenburg. The department of educational affairs was based in Osnabrück, the department for financial affairs (Regierungskasse treasurer's office) in Aurich.

Kreise
(districts)

- Ammerland district
- District of Aurich
- Bentheim
- District of Cloppenburg
- Emsland district
- District of Friesland
- District of Leer
- District of Oldenburg
- District of Osnabrück
- District of Vechta
- District of Wesermarsch
- District of Wittmund

Kreisfreie Städte
(district-free towns)

- Delmenhorst
- Emden
- Oldenburg (city)
- Osnabrück (city)
- Wilhelmshaven
