= Aron Domżała =

Polish rally raid driver

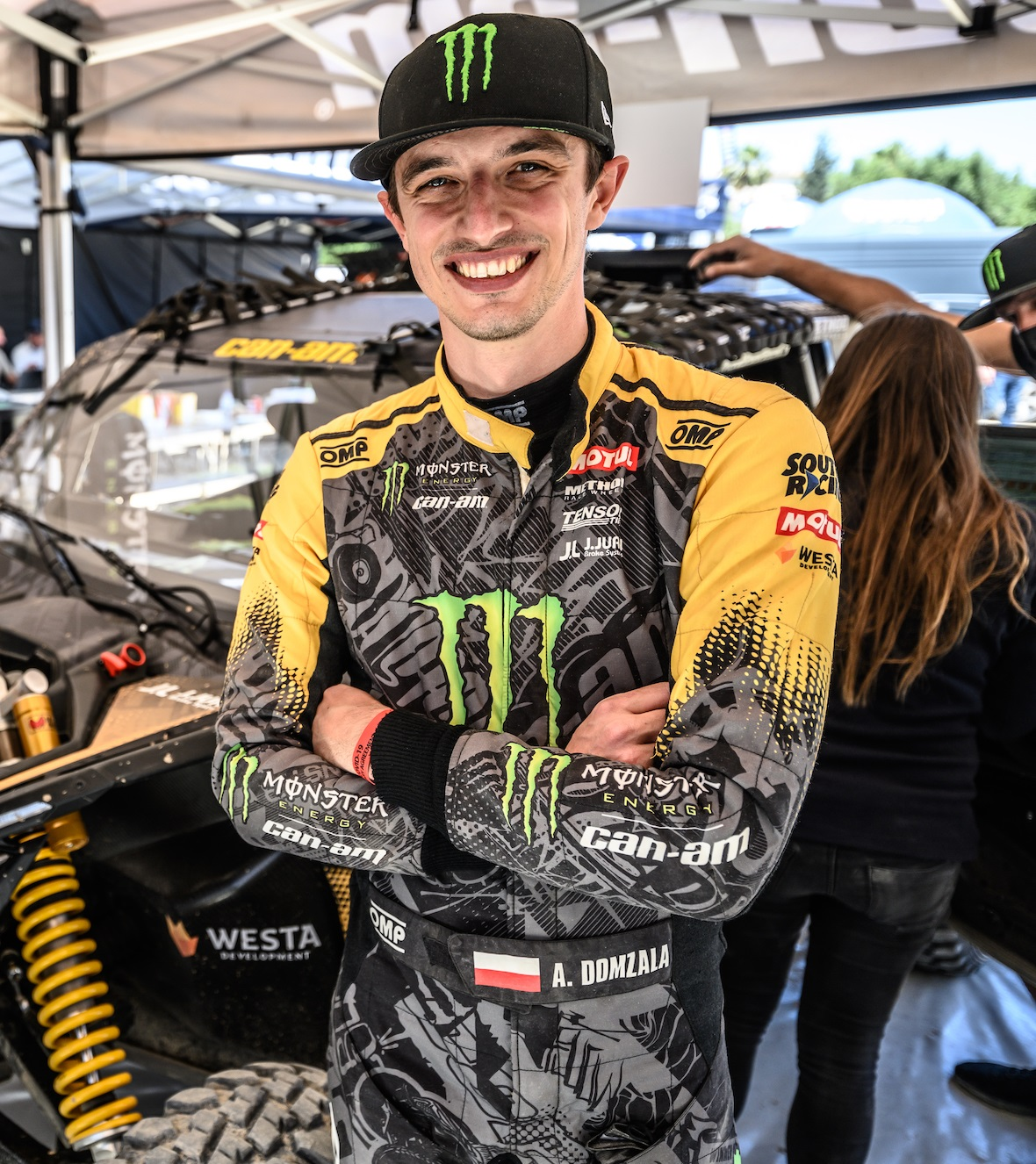
- Nationality: Polish
- Born: 1 August 1989 (age 36) Barlinek, Poland

Championship titles
- 2016: FIM Cross-Country Rallies World Championship (T3)

Aron Domżała (born 1 August 1989) is a Polish rally raid racer who currently competes in the UTV category. He won the 2016 FIA Cross Country Rally World Cup in the T3 class.
