= Renaud Jamoul =

Belgian rally co-driver (born 1984)

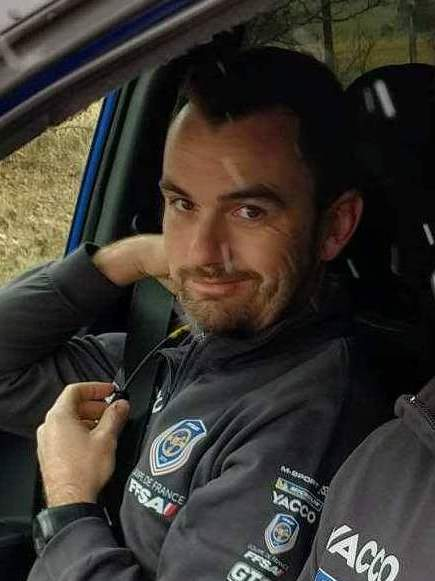
- Jamoul at the 2019 Monte Carlo Rally

Personal information
- Nationality: (Belgium) Belgian
- Born: June 10, 1984 (age 42)

World Rally Championship record
- Years active: 2006–2008, 2010, 2012–2017, 2019–2021
- Driver: (Luxembourg) Gilles Schammel (France) Mathieu Arzeno (France) Quentin Gilbert (France) Adrien Fourmaux
- Teams: M-Sport
- Rallies: 84
- Championships: 0
- Rally wins: 0
- Podiums: 0
- Stage wins: 1
- First rally: 2006 Rally Catalunya
- Last rally: 2021 Acropolis Rally

Renaud Jamoul (born 10 June 1984) is a Belgian rallying co-driver. He currently co-drives former Formula One driver Jos Verstappen in the 2025 European Rally Championship.

Jamoul previously partnered with Adrien Fourmaux for M-Sport Ford World Rally Team, co-driving him in the World Rally Championship and World Rally Championship-2 categories in 2019–2021. Mid 2021, he was replaced by Alexandre Coria.

== Rally career ==
Jamoul made his WRC debut at the 2006 Rally Catalunya. The current partnership with the French driver Adrien Fourmaux was started in 2019, with both of them are set to drive for M-Sport Ford World Rally Team in the sport's top tier.

Since late 2022, Jamoul co-drives former Formula One driver Jos Verstappen, mainly in local rallies. In 2025, they announced a full campaign in European Rally Championship.

== Rally results ==
=== WRC results ===
Year	Entrant	Car	1	2	3	4	5	6	7	8	9	10	11	12	13	14	15	16	WDC	Points
2006	JPS Junior Team Luxemburg	Ford Fiesta ST	MON	SWE	MEX	ESP; 51	FRA; 53	ARG	ITA; 40	GRE	GER; 37	FIN; 63	JPN	CYP	TUR	AUS	NZL	GBR; 57	NC	0
2007	JPS Junior Team Luxemburg	Citroën C2 R2	MON	SWE	NOR	MEX	POR; 58	ARG	ITA; 43	GRE	FIN; Ret	GER; 59	NZL	ESP; 47	FRA; Ret	JPN	IRE	GBR	NC	0
2008	JPS Junior Team Luxemburg	Renault Clio R3	MON	SWE	MEX	ARG	JOR; 14	ITA; 34	GRE	TUR	FIN; 34	GER; Ret	NZL	ESP; Ret	FRA; 33	JPN	GBR		NC	0
2010	Mathieu Arzeno	Citroën C2 R2 Max	SWE	MEX	JOR	TUR	NZL	POR; Ret											NC	0
2010	Mathieu Arzeno	Citroën C2 S1600							BUL; 23	FIN	GER; Ret	JPN	FRA; 30						NC	0
2010	Mathieu Arzeno	Ford Fiesta R2												ESP; Ret	GBR				NC	0
2012	Saintéloc Racing	Peugeot 207 S2000	MON; Ret	SWE	MEX	POR	ARG	GRE	NZL	FIN			FRA; Ret	ITA	ESP				32nd	1
2012	Mathieu Arzeno	Peugeot 207 S2000									GER; 10								32nd	1
2012	Mathieu Arzeno	Citroën DS3 R3T										GBR; 18							32nd	1
2013	Quentin Gilbert	Citroën DS3 R3T	MON	SWE	MEX	POR	ARG	GRE	ITA	FIN	GER	AUS	FRA; 13	ESP	GBR; 16				NC	0
2014	Quentin Gilbert	Citroën DS3 R3T	MON; 39	SWE															NC	0
2014	Drive Dmack	Ford Fiesta R5			MEX; Ret		ARG; Ret	ITA; 17											NC	0
2014	Quentin Gilbert	Ford Fiesta R2				POR; Ret			POL; Ret	FIN; 21	GER; 57	AUS		ESP; 38					NC	0
2014	Quentin Gilbert	Ford Fiesta R5											FRA; 15		GBR; 21				NC	0
2015	Quentin Gilbert	Citroën DS3 R3T Max	MON; 22	SWE	MEX	ARG	POR; 22	ITA	POL; 53	FIN; 18	GER	AUS	FRA; 92	ESP; 18	GBR; 27				NC	0
2016	DGM Sport	Citroën DS3 R5	MON; 11	SWE	MEX	ARG	POR; Ret	ITA; 23	POL; Ret	FIN; 13	GER; Ret	CHN; C	FRA; 28	ESP					NC	0
2016	Abu Dhabi Total WRT	Citroën DS3 WRC													GBR; 17	AUS			NC	0
2017	Quentin Gilbert	Ford Fiesta R5	MON; 13																NC	0
2017	Quentin Gilbert	Škoda Fabia R5		SWE	MEX	FRA	ARG	POR; Ret	ITA	POL; 15	FIN; 14	GER; 13	ESP	GBR	AUS				NC	0
2019	Adrien Fourmaux	Ford Fiesta R5	MON; 10			FRA; 30	ARG	CHL	POR; 13			GER; 23	TUR	GBR; 15					30th	1
2019	Adrien Fourmaux	Ford Fiesta R2		SWE; 45	MEX					ITA; 36	FIN; 23								30th	1
2019	Adrien Fourmaux	Ford Fiesta R5 Mk. II													ESP; 32	AUS; C			30th	1
2020	M-Sport Ford WRT	Ford Fiesta R5 Mk. II	MON; 15	SWE; 18	MEX	EST; 13	TUR; 9	ITA; Ret	MNZ; 49										22nd	2
2021	M-Sport Ford WRT	Ford Fiesta R5 Mk. II	MON; 9	ARC; 48			ITA; 30		EST; 12										10th	36
2021	M-Sport Ford WRT	Ford Fiesta WRC			CRO; 5	POR; 6		KEN; 5		BEL; Ret	GRE; 7	FIN	ESP	MNZ					10th	36

* Season still in progress.
