= 2016 World Rally Championship =

44th season of the World Rally Championship

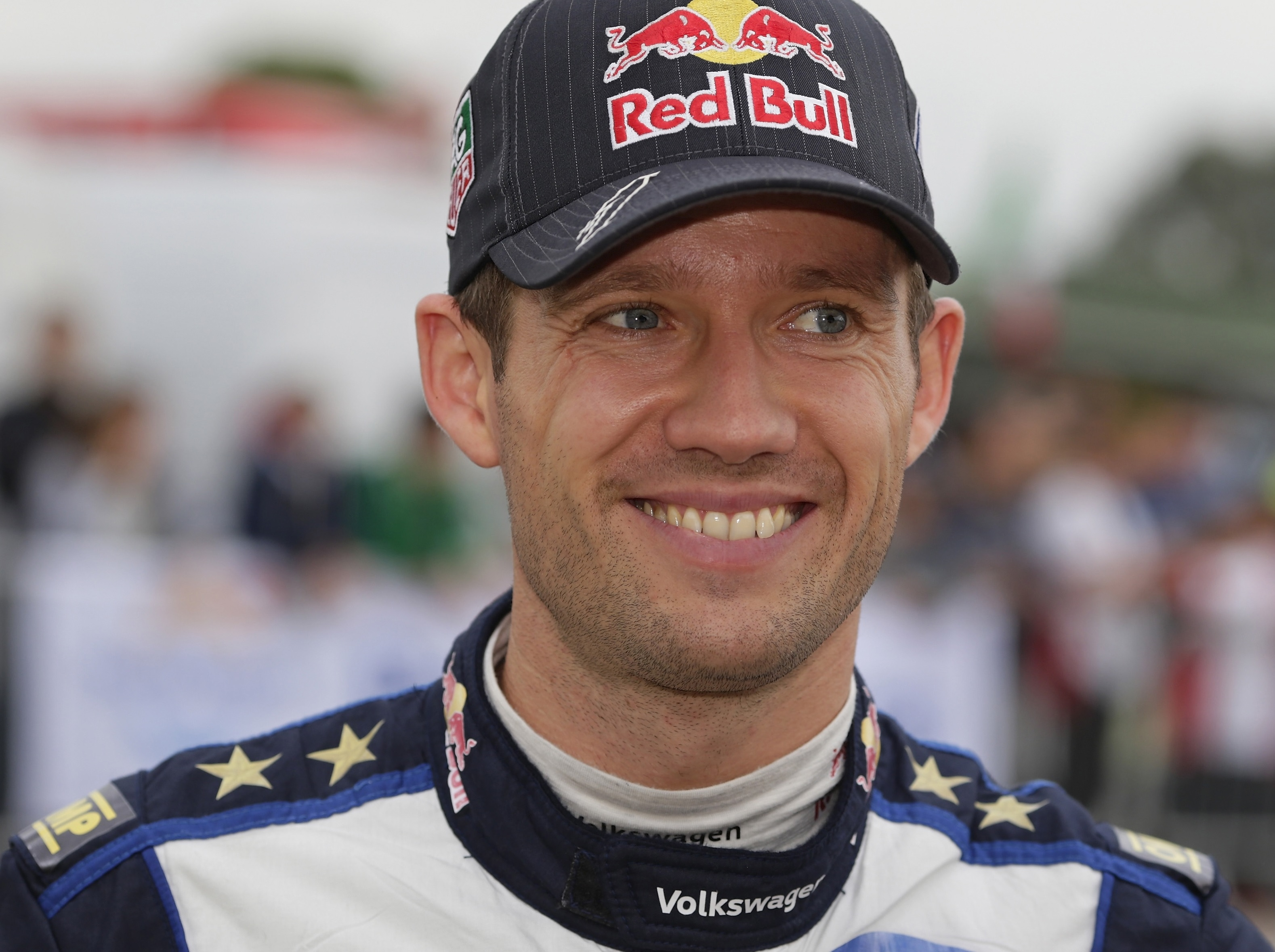
Sébastien Ogier successfully defended the drivers' title.

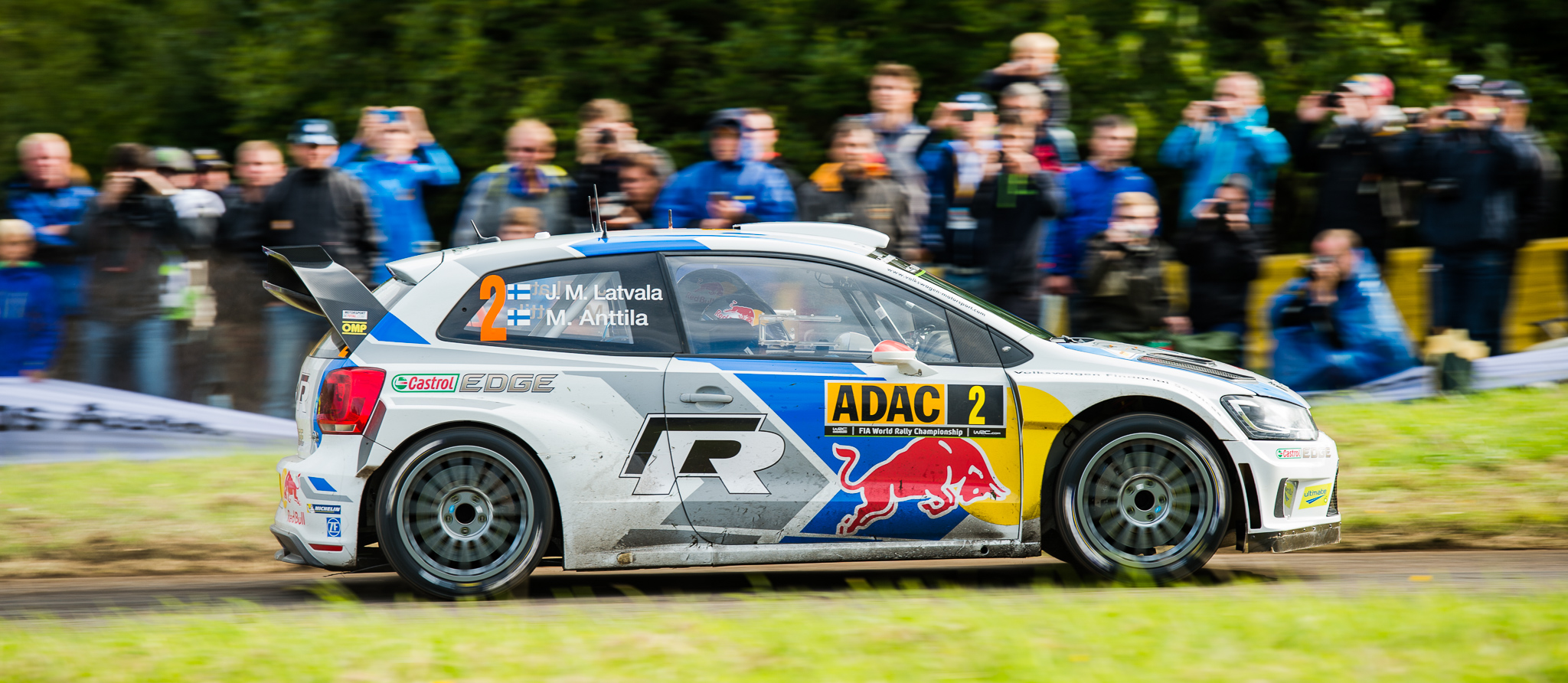
The Volkswagen Polo R WRC, car entered by Volkswagen Motorsport, who successfully defended manufacturers' title.

The 2016 FIA World Rally Championship was the 44th season of the World Rally Championship, a rallying championship recognised by the Fédération Internationale de l'Automobile (FIA) as the highest class of international rallying. Teams and drivers competed in thirteen rounds—starting with the Rallye Monte Carlo in January and finishing with Rally Australia in November—for the World Rally Championships for Drivers and Manufacturers.

Sébastien Ogier started the season as the defending drivers' champion. His team, Volkswagen Motorsport, were the defending manufacturers' champions. Both Ogier and Volkswagen Motorsport claimed their fourth consecutive drivers' and manufacturers' championships.

== Calendar ==
The calendar was announced in November 2015 by the FIA. The season was scheduled to expand with one rally in comparison to the 2015 championship, contested over fourteen rounds in Europe, the Americas, Oceania and Asia, but the Chinese round was ultimately cancelled.

Round	Dates	Rally name	Rally headquarters	Surface	Stages	Distance
1	21–24 January	(Monaco) Monte Carlo Rally	Gap, Hautes-Alpes, France	Mixed	16	337.59km
2	12–14 February	Rally Sweden	Karlstad, Värmland	Snow	12^{1a}	226.48km^{1b}
3	3–6 March	Rally Mexico	León, Guanajuato	Gravel	21	399.67km
4	21–24 April	Rally Argentina	Villa Carlos Paz, Córdoba	Gravel	18	364.68km
5	19–22 May	Rally de Portugal	Matosinhos, Porto	Gravel	19	368.00km
6	9–12 June	(Italy) Rally Italia Sardegna	Alghero, Sardinia	Gravel	19	324.60km
7	30 June–3 July	Rally Poland	Mikołajki, Warmia-Masuria	Gravel	21	306.10km
8	28–31 July	Rally Finland	Jyväskylä, Keski-Suomi	Gravel	24	333.99km
9	19–21 August	(Germany) Rallye Deutschland	Trier, Rhineland-Palatinate	Tarmac	18	306.80km
10	9–11 September	Rally China	Beijing, Hebei	Tarmac	Cancelled^{2}	
11	30 September–2 October	(France) Tour de Corse	Bastia, Haute-Corse	Tarmac	10	390.92km
12	13–16 October	(Spain) Rally Catalunya	Salou, Tarragona	Mixed	21	321.08km
13	28–30 October	(United Kingdom) Wales Rally GB	Deeside, Flintshire	Gravel	22	336.00km
14	18–20 November	Rally Australia	Coffs Harbour, New South Wales	Gravel	23	283.36km^{3}

Notes

- ^1 – Rally Sweden was shortened due to warm weather conditions turning frozen roads into soft, muddy gravel and making the studded tyres unsafe to use.
- ^2 – Rally China was cancelled due to weather damage caused by torrential storms and flooding in July.
- ^3 – The route of Rally Australia was shortened following concerns over dust reducing visibility in forest stages.

=== Calendar changes ===
- Rally Australia was moved from its September date to November to become the final round of the championship.
- The calendar was to be expanded to fourteen rounds in 2016, with the inclusion of the Rally of China, seventeen years after its only appearance as a round of the WRC.
- The Tour de Corse relocated its headquarters from Corte to Bastia, which features a brand-new route.

== Teams and drivers ==
The following teams and drivers competed in the World Rally Championship during the 2016 season:

World Rally Car entries eligible to score manufacturer points
Manufacturer	Car	Entrant	Tyre	No.	Drivers	Co-drivers	Rounds
Volkswagen	Volkswagen Polo R WRC	(Germany) Volkswagen Motorsport	M	1	(France) Sébastien Ogier	(France) Julien Ingrassia	All
Volkswagen	Volkswagen Polo R WRC	(Germany) Volkswagen Motorsport	M	2	(Finland) Jari-Matti Latvala	(Finland) Miikka Anttila	All
Volkswagen	Volkswagen Polo R WRC	(Germany) Volkswagen Motorsport II	M	9	(Norway) Andreas Mikkelsen	(Norway) Anders Jæger	All
Hyundai	Hyundai i20 WRC	(South Korea) Hyundai Motorsport	M	3	(Belgium) Thierry Neuville	(Belgium) Nicolas Gilsoul	1–4, 7–13
Hyundai	Hyundai i20 WRC	(South Korea) Hyundai Motorsport	M	3	(New Zealand) Hayden Paddon	(New Zealand) John Kennard	5–6
Hyundai	Hyundai i20 WRC	(South Korea) Hyundai Motorsport	M	4	(Spain) Dani Sordo	(Spain) Marc Martí	1, 3–6, 9–12
Hyundai	Hyundai i20 WRC	(South Korea) Hyundai Motorsport	M	4	(New Zealand) Hayden Paddon	(New Zealand) John Kennard	2, 7–8, 13
Hyundai	Hyundai i20 WRC	(South Korea) Hyundai Motorsport N	M	10	(New Zealand) Hayden Paddon	(New Zealand) John Kennard	1
Hyundai	Hyundai i20 WRC	(South Korea) Hyundai Motorsport N	M	10	(Netherlands) Kevin Abbring	(United Kingdom) Sebastian Marshall	5–6, 11
Hyundai	Hyundai i20 WRC	(South Korea) Hyundai Motorsport N	M	20	(Spain) Dani Sordo	(Spain) Marc Martí	2, 7, 13
Hyundai	Hyundai i20 WRC	(South Korea) Hyundai Motorsport N	M	20	(New Zealand) Hayden Paddon	(New Zealand) John Kennard	3–4, 9–12
Hyundai	Hyundai i20 WRC	(South Korea) Hyundai Motorsport N	M	20	(Belgium) Thierry Neuville	(Belgium) Nicolas Gilsoul	5–6
Hyundai	Hyundai i20 WRC	(South Korea) Hyundai Motorsport N	M	20	(Netherlands) Kevin Abbring	(United Kingdom) Sebastian Marshall	8
Ford	Ford Fiesta RS WRC	(United Kingdom) M-Sport World Rally Team	M	5	(Norway) Mads Østberg	(Norway) Ola Fløene	All
Ford	Ford Fiesta RS WRC	(United Kingdom) M-Sport World Rally Team	M	6	(France) Eric Camilli	(France) Nicolas Klinger	1–2
Ford	Ford Fiesta RS WRC	(United Kingdom) M-Sport World Rally Team	M	6	(France) Eric Camilli	(France) Benjamin Veillas	3–13
Ford	Ford Fiesta RS WRC	(United Kingdom) DMACK World Rally Team	D	12	(Estonia) Ott Tänak	(Estonia) Raigo Mõlder	All
Ford	Ford Fiesta RS WRC	(Czech Republic) Jipocar Czech National Team	P	21	(Czech Republic) Martin Prokop	(Czech Republic) Jan Tománek	3, 5–6, 11
Ford	Ford Fiesta RS WRC	(Saudi Arabia) Yazeed Racing	P	30	(Saudi Arabia) Yazeed Al-Rajhi	(United Kingdom) Michael Orr	2, 5–8, 12

World Rally Car entries ineligible to score manufacturer points
Manufacturer	Car	Entrant	Tyre	Drivers	Co-drivers	Rounds
Citroën	Citroën DS3 WRC	(France) Abu Dhabi Total World Rally Team	M	(United Kingdom) Kris Meeke	(Republic of Ireland) Paul Nagle	1–2, 5, 8, 10–12
Citroën	Citroën DS3 WRC	(France) Abu Dhabi Total World Rally Team	M	(France) Stéphane Lefebvre	(France) Gabin Moreau	1, 5, 7, 9
Citroën	Citroën DS3 WRC	(France) Abu Dhabi Total World Rally Team	M	(France) Stéphane Lefebvre	(France) Gilles De Turckheim	13
Citroën	Citroën DS3 WRC	(France) Abu Dhabi Total World Rally Team	M	(Republic of Ireland) Craig Breen	(United Kingdom) Scott Martin	2, 7–8, 10–12
Citroën	Citroën DS3 WRC	(France) Abu Dhabi Total World Rally Team	M	(United Arab Emirates) Khalid Al Qassimi	(United Kingdom) Chris Patterson	2, 5, 8, 12
Citroën	Citroën DS3 WRC	(France) Abu Dhabi Total World Rally Team	M	(France) Quentin Gilbert	(Belgium) Renaud Jamoul	13
Citroën	Citroën DS3 WRC	(Italy) D-Max Racing	P	(Italy) Felice Re	(Italy) Mara Bariani	1
Citroën	Citroën DS3 WRC	(Argentina) Marcos Ligato	M	(Argentina) Marcos Ligato	(Argentina) Rubén García	4, 8
Citroën	Citroën DS3 WRC	(Argentina) José Alberto Nicolas	M	(Argentina) José Alberto Nicolas	(Argentina) Miguel Recalt	4
Citroën	Citroën DS3 WRC	(Argentina) José Alberto Nicolas	M	(Argentina) José Alberto Nicolas	(Argentina) Leonardo Suaya	8
Ford	Ford Fiesta RS WRC	(United Kingdom) M-Sport World Rally Team	M	(France) Bryan Bouffier	(France) Victor Bellotto	1
Ford	Ford Fiesta RS WRC	(Italy) FWRT s.r.l.	P	(Italy) Lorenzo Bertelli	(Italy) Simone Scattolin	1–4, 6–8, 10–13
Ford	Ford Fiesta RS WRC	(Italy) BRC Racing Team	P	(Poland) Robert Kubica	(Poland) Maciek Szczepaniak	1
Ford	Ford Fiesta RS WRC	(Norway) Adapta Motorsport	M	(Norway) Henning Solberg	(Austria) Ilka Minor	2, 4–7, 12
Ford	Ford Fiesta RS WRC	(Italy) Motorsport Italia	P	(Mexico) Benito Guerra	(Spain) Borja Rozada	3
Ford	Ford Fiesta RS WRC	(Czech Republic) Jipocar Czech National Team	P	(Slovakia) Jaroslav Melichárek	(Slovakia) Erik Melichárek	5
Ford	Ford Fiesta RS WRC	(Italy) A-Style Team	P	(Switzerland) Federico Della Casa	(Italy) Domenico Pozzi	6
Ford	Ford Fiesta RS WRC	(Italy) Delta Rally	P	(Italy) Roberto Tononi	(Italy) Paolo Comini	6
Ford	Ford Fiesta RS WRC	(United Arab Emirates) Abdullah Al Qassimi Rally Team	M	(United Arab Emirates) Abdullah Al Qassimi	(United Kingdom) Steve Lancaster	8, 12
Ford	Ford Fiesta RS WRC	(Ukraine) AT Rally Team	P	(Ukraine) Oleksiy Tamrazov	(Italy) Nicola Arena	8
Ford	Ford Fiesta RS WRC	(Germany) Toksport World Rally Team	D	(Finland) Matti Koskelo	(Finland) Rami Suorsa	8
Mini	Mini John Cooper Works WRC	(Ukraine) Eurolamp World Rally Team	P	(Ukraine) Valeriy Gorban	(Ukraine) Volodymyr Korsia	2–8, 11–12
Mini	Mini John Cooper Works WRC	(Ukraine) Eurolamp World Rally Team	P	(Estonia) Mait Maarend	(Estonia) Mihkel Kapp	2, 6

=== Constructor changes ===
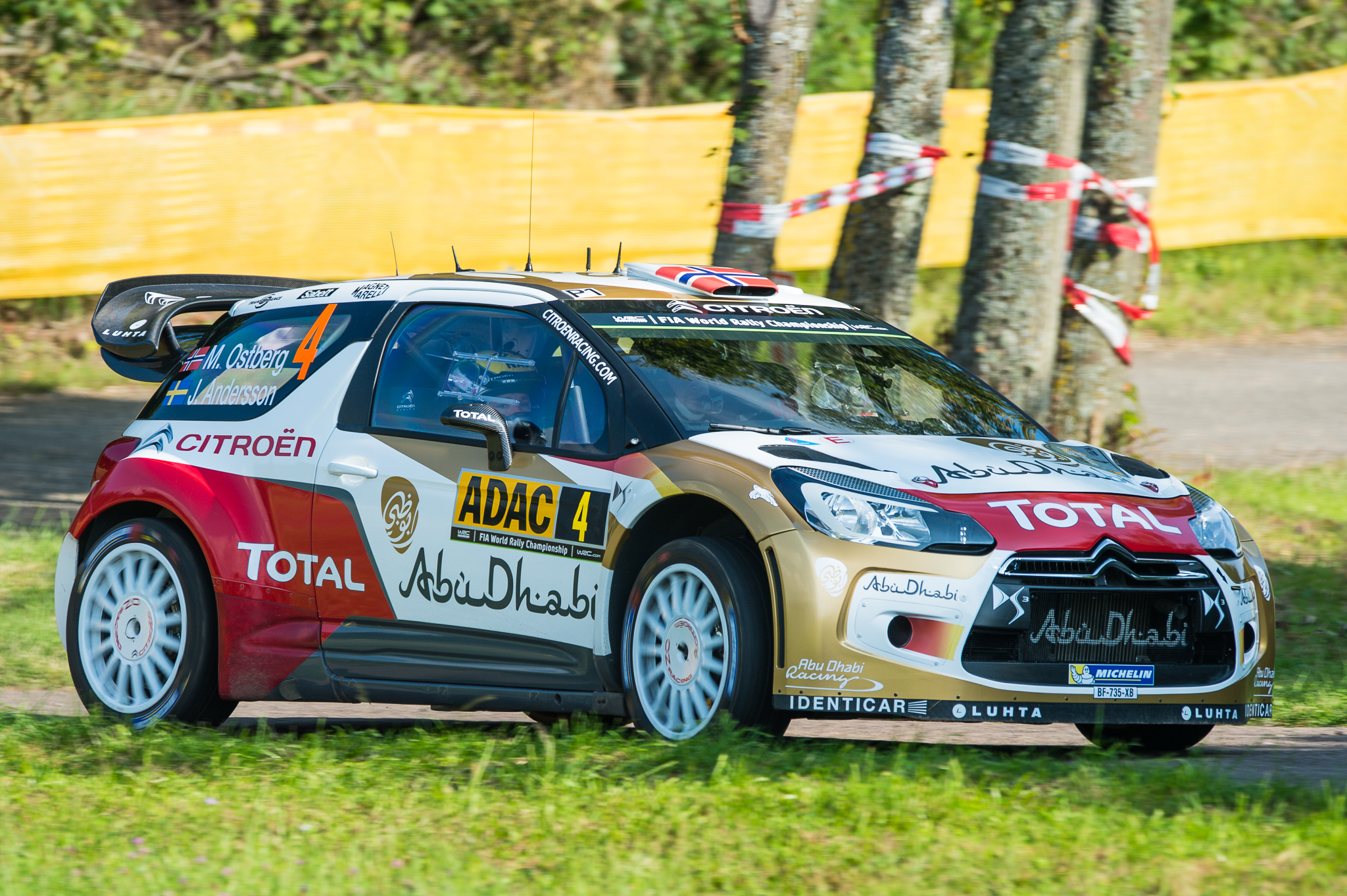
Citroën formally withdrew manufacturer support for the DS3 WRC at the end of the 2015 season.

- Citroën withdrew their works team from the 2016 season in order to focus on development of their 2017 car ahead of major regulation changes for the 2017 season. However, the manufacturer remained open to contesting selected events and the Citroën DS3 WRC was still made available to privateer teams. Citroën previously withdrew formal works support for a team in 2006 when the Xsara WRC reached the end of its working life, in order to focus on developing the Xsara's replacement, the C4 WRC.
- After contesting selected World Rally Championship and WRC2 events between 2013 and 2015, Anglo-Chinese tyre manufacturer DMACK planned to contest the full 2016 season as a manufacturer team. The team is equipped with Ford Fiesta RS WRCs built and prepared by M-Sport.

=== Driver changes ===
- Elfyn Evans was dropped by M-Sport World Rally Team in favour of Mads Østberg and Eric Camilli. However he would remain with the team next season, competing in WRC-2 with all-new Ford Fiesta R5.
- Mads Østberg left Citroën to and returned to M-Sport World Rally Team, the team he competed for in 2013. He is partnered by Toyota test driver Eric Camilli, who made his World Rally Championship début after competing part-time in the WRC2 championship throughout 2015.
- After competing part-time with Hyundai in 2015, Hayden Paddon was promoted to a full-time seat for the 2016 season. Hyundai's development driver Kevin Abbring took Paddon's place making regular appearances for the team, expanding on his four-round campaign in 2015.
- Ott Tänak left the M-Sport World Rally Team and returned to the DMACK World Rally Team, the team he drove for at selected events in 2014.

== Rally summaries ==
=== Round 1 — Monte Carlo Rally ===
Defending World Champion Sébastien Ogier started the season with a win in Monte Carlo, his third consecutive in the principality. Ogier and Kris Meeke fought for the rally lead until Meeke hit a rock on SS12. He managed to return to the stage finish but was forced to withdraw due to damage sustained to his gearbox. Jari-Matti Latvala retired from third after losing control of his car and running off the road, hitting a spectator, though no-one was seriously injured. Andreas Mikkelsen finished second after resisting Thierry Neuville. Only seven WRC cars reached the end of the rally after six retirements.

=== Round 2 — Rally Sweden ===
The Rally Sweden was marked by the lack of snow, which forced the organization to change the rally route and cancel some of the stages that had started to thaw out, making the studded snow tyres unsafe to use. Ogier protested the event going ahead, but with the changes to the route approved by the FIA, he took to the start and went on to claim the win.

Jari-Matti Latvala was delayed by mechanical issues, suffering a broken drive shaft early in the second stage. Andreas Mikkelsen in the third Polo R WRC was Ogier's early challenger, but as the temperature started to drop and the roads started to freeze over, Hayden Paddon emerged as his biggest rival. By the third day, the roads had completely set, allowing Ogier to maintain his lead. Mads Østberg completed the podium, having taken advantage of his rivals' ongoing battles to build and sustain a margin big enough to maintain third overall.

=== Round 3 — Rally Mexico ===
Having scored no points in the opening rounds while Ogier took a full 58, Jari-Matti Latvala started the Rally Mexico needing to secure a strong result if he was to have any hope of mounting a bid for the World Drivers' Championship. With the running order set based on championship positions, Ogier was forced to sweep the roads clear of loose gravel, while Latvala enjoyed comparatively clean roads. He took advantage of this from the first stage, establishing an early lead that he consistently built upon throughout the first two days of the event. With the running order for the final day—which included the single longest special stage on the calendar, weighing in at eighty kilometres—based on the rally standings, Latvala's advantage was quashed, but his lead strong enough to secure his first win of the season ahead of Ogier. Hyundai's Dani Sordo finished third overall, but a late penalty handed the final podium place to Mads Østberg.

=== Round 4 — Rally Argentina ===
Wishing to continue his point scoring momentum, Jari-Matti Latvala targeted Argentina as another rally to win to further his championship standings. Another driver determined to score a podium in this rally was Hayden Paddon. The two drivers were in close competition on Friday, but by Saturday morning Latvala pulled ahead. In the afternoon, however, Latvala suffered a major accident, forcing him to retire, and giving the lead to Paddon. Engine problems on Sunday combined with a quick time from Sebastian Ogier on the penultimate stage meant the winner would be decided on the power stage. Hayden Paddon won the power stage and took his first WRC event win. Sebastian Ogier placed second, While Andreas Mikkelsen placed third. Paddon was elevated to second place in the overall championship, but Volkswagen Motorsport held the lead in the manufacturers championship.

=== Round 5 — Rally de Portugal ===
Participating in his third even of the season as Citroën was not included in the manufacturers championship, Kris Meeke was determined to gain experience for the upcoming 2017 season. He managed to keep a strong lead throughout Friday, but second place was in high contention. Dani Sordo and Sebastian Ogier fought for the position in the afternoon. Hayden Paddon and Ott Tänak would run off of the road in the same place. Paddon's car became engulfed in flames which destroyed it, but Tänak managed to pull his vehicle away from the inferno. Saturday proved only to increase the gap between Meeke and Ogier, and on Sunday Andreas Mikkelsen would take second place off of Ogier. Kris Meeke took the event win, but Ogier would take the three power stage points.

=== Round 6 — Rally Italia Sardegna ===
Jari-Matti Latvala wished to gain another win in Italy's WRC Event to reignite his season after scoring points in only two of five events so far. He led Friday morning, but by the last stage was passed by Thierry Neuville. Hayden Paddon ran off of the road on stage seven, destroying his car for the second event in a row. Andreas Mikkelsen and later Mads Ostberg would both be involved in incidents on Saturday afternoon, forcing Mikkelsen out of the point-scoring positions and Ostberg to retire. Thierry Neuville would win his second WRC event, followed by Latvala in second and then Ogier, who managed to score all three power stage points.

=== Round 7 — Rally Poland ===
After career-best position in Poland in 2015, Ott Tänak was determined to make the most out of this year's running of the event. Friday saw the lead changing between Tänak, Andreas Mikkelsen, and Hayden Paddon, the later two of which wanted redemption for the lack of points in Sardinia. On Saturday, Tänak would expand his lead over Andreas, who was close behind. Sunday seemed as if Tänak would take the victory, but on the penultimate stage Tänak would receive a punctured tire, putting him in second place. Andreas Mikkelsen ended up winning the event ahead of a crushed Tänak, with Hayden Paddon finishing in third.

=== Round 8 — Rally Finland ===
Being his home event, and after winning the event the previous two years, Jari-Matti Latvala was an obvious contender in Finland. Kris Meeke would return to participate for the first time after his victory in Portugal. Meeke took the lead on Friday and held it firm, while Latvala chased behind. Ott Tänak, despite holding an early second place, would spin and puncture a tire before the day was out. Sebastian Ogier would get stuck in a ditch, putting him out of the points. On Saturday, Meeke would distance his lead over Latvala a long way. Stages thirteen and fourteen would be canceled by violent crashes by Lorenzo Bertelli and Eric Camilli respectively. Craig Breen would find his way into third after Tänak's crash. On Sunday, Meeke became the first Brit to win the event. Latvala would follow up, and Craig Breen would score third, a personal best. Kris Meeke ended up breaking the record for the highest average speed in a rally.

=== Round 9 — Rallye Deutschland ===
The first event on tarmac since Monte Carlo, Sebastian Ogier would not have to clean the roads as he did by going first in gravel stages. Though determined to place first, an early mistake pushed him behind Andreas Mikkelsen. Thierry Neuville, considering Germany his home event as it is the closest event to his home country Belgium, kept behind Ogier in third. Jari-Matti Latvala retired on the first stage due to gearbox issues. Ogier would regain the lead on Saturday, and Dani Sordo would take third from Neuville. By the end of the event, Mikkelsen would fall a further two positions, giving the win to Ogier. Dani Sordo would place second, finishing ahead of Neuville by less than a tenth of a second.

=== Round 10 — Tour de Corse ===
Due to the cancellation of Rally China, the Tour de Corse was the round after Rallye Deutschland. Being another tarmac event, Sebastian Ogier saw this as another opportunity to take a win. Ogier started off strongly, winning all four events on Friday. Kris Meeke pushed his way into second, but a spin and a puncture set him back. Dani Sordo also fell from second due to a puncture. This gave the position to Thierry Neuville and third to Jari-Matti Latvala. On Saturday, Andreas Mikkelsen overtook Latvala and attempted to chase Neuville. Meeke would crash on Saturday, pulling him out of the points places. The event would finish in the order it was in that evening, with Ogier finishing first, Neuville finishing second, and Mikkelsen in third. Despite finishing in sixteenth, Meeke would take first in the power stage.

== Results and standings ==
=== Season summary ===
Round	Event name	Winning driver	Winning co-driver	Winning manufacturer	Winning time	Report
1	(Monaco) Monte Carlo Rally	(France) Sébastien Ogier	(France) Julien Ingrassia	(Germany) Volkswagen Motorsport	3:49:53.1	Report
2	Rally Sweden	(France) Sébastien Ogier	(France) Julien Ingrassia	(Germany) Volkswagen Motorsport	1:59:47.4	Report
3	Rally Mexico	(Finland) Jari-Matti Latvala	(Finland) Miikka Anttila	(Germany) Volkswagen Motorsport	4:25:57.4	Report
4	Rally Argentina	(New Zealand) Hayden Paddon	(New Zealand) John Kennard	(South Korea) Hyundai Motorsport N	3:40:52.9	Report
5	Rally de Portugal	(United Kingdom) Kris Meeke	(Republic of Ireland) Paul Nagle	(France) Abu Dhabi Total WRT	3:59:01.0	Report
6	(Italy) Rally Italia Sardegna	(Belgium) Thierry Neuville	(Belgium) Nicolas Gilsoul	(South Korea) Hyundai Motorsport N	3:35:25.8	Report
7	Rally Poland	(Norway) Andreas Mikkelsen	(Norway) Anders Jæger	(Germany) Volkswagen Motorsport II	2:37:34.4	Report
8	Rally Finland	(United Kingdom) Kris Meeke	(Republic of Ireland) Paul Nagle	(France) Abu Dhabi Total WRT	2:38:05.8	Report
9	(Germany) Rallye Deutschland	(France) Sébastien Ogier	(France) Julien Ingrassia	(Germany) Volkswagen Motorsport	3:00:26.7	Report
10	Rally China	Rally cancelled (due to the 2016 China floods)				
11	(France) Tour de Corse	(France) Sébastien Ogier	(France) Julien Ingrassia	(Germany) Volkswagen Motorsport	4:07:17.0	Report
12	(Spain) Rally Catalunya	(France) Sébastien Ogier	(France) Julien Ingrassia	(Germany) Volkswagen Motorsport	3:13:03.6	Report
13	(United Kingdom) Wales Rally GB	(France) Sébastien Ogier	(France) Julien Ingrassia	(Germany) Volkswagen Motorsport	3:14:30.2	Report
14	Rally Australia	(Norway) Andreas Mikkelsen	(Norway) Anders Jæger	(Germany) Volkswagen Motorsport II	2:46:05.7	Report

=== FIA World Rally Championship for Drivers ===
Points are awarded to the top ten classified finishers. There are also three bonus points awarded to the winner of the Power stage, two points for second place and one for third.

Position	1st	2nd	3rd	4th	5th	6th	7th	8th	9th	10th
Points	25	18	15	12	10	8	6	4	2	1

Pos.	Driver	MON (Monaco)	SWE (Sweden)	MEX (Mexico)	ARG (Argentina)	POR (Portugal)	ITA (Italy)	POL (Poland)	FIN (Finland)	GER (Germany)	CHN (China)	FRA (France)	ESP (Spain)	GBR (United Kingdom)	AUS (Australia)	Points
1	(France) Sébastien Ogier	1^{1}	1^{1}	2^{1}	2^{3}	3^{1}	3^{1}	6^{1}	24	1^{3}	C	1^{3}	1^{2}	1	2^{1}	268
2	(Belgium) Thierry Neuville	3	14	Ret	6	29	1	4^{3}	4^{1}	3^{1}	C	2	3	3^{3}	3^{2}	160
3	(Norway) Andreas Mikkelsen	2^{3}	4^{2}	Ret	3	2^{3}	13	1	7	4	C	3^{2}	Ret	12^{2}	1	154
4	(New Zealand) Hayden Paddon	25	2	5^{3}	1^{1}	Ret	Ret	3	5^{2}	5	C	6	4	4	4	138
5	(Spain) Dani Sordo	6^{2}	6	4	4^{2}	4	4	Ret	WD	2	C	7	2^{3}	6	5^{3}	130
6	(Finland) Jari-Matti Latvala	Ret	26	1^{2}	16	6^{2}	2^{3}	5^{2}	2^{3}	48^{2}	C	4	14^{1}	7	9	112
7	(Norway) Mads Østberg	4	3	3	5	7	Ret	8	6	6	C	9	5	8	6	102
8	(Estonia) Ott Tänak	7	5	6	15	Ret	5	2	Ret	23	C	10	6	2^{1}	7	88
9	(United Kingdom) Kris Meeke	Ret	23^{3}			1			1		C	16^{1}	Ret	5		64
10	(Republic of Ireland) Craig Breen		8					7	3		C	5	10	Ret		36
11	(France) Eric Camilli	Ret	Ret	16	8	5	6	10	Ret	50	C	8	19	10	Ret	28
12	(Finland) Esapekka Lappi	9	12				21	14	8	7	C			11	8	16
13	(France) Stéphane Lefebvre	5				35		9		Ret	C			9		14
14	(Norway) Henning Solberg		7		9	27	7	15	12		C			WD		14
15	(Czech Republic) Martin Prokop			7		8	9				C		Ret			12
16	(Netherlands) Kevin Abbring					Ret	15^{2}		9		C	Ret	7	Ret		10
17	(Sweden) Pontus Tidemand		11			9		19	Ret	8	C		9	13		8
18	(Finland) Teemu Suninen	12	10	9		45	8	11	10	56	C	15	28	14		8
19	(Czech Republic) Jan Kopecký					19	10			9	C	12	8	16	WD	7
20	(Argentina) Marcos Ligato				7				44		C					6
21	(United Kingdom) Elfyn Evans	8	9		17	30		13	11		C	11		WD		6
22	(Italy) Lorenzo Bertelli	Ret	Ret	8	13	WD	Ret	12	Ret	WD	C	17	11	15	10	5
23	(Germany) Armin Kremer	10		19			12	Ret		10	C		Ret			2
24	(Peru) Nicolás Fuchs			14	10	10	Ret	20			C			21	11	2
25	(Ukraine) Valeriy Gorban		24	10	Ret	Ret	28	27	21		C		15	37		1
Pos.	Driver	MON (Monaco)	SWE (Sweden)	MEX (Mexico)	ARG (Argentina)	POR (Portugal)	ITA (Italy)	POL (Poland)	FIN (Finland)	GER (Germany)	CHN (China)	FRA (France)	ESP (Spain)	GBR (United Kingdom)	AUS (Australia)	Points

Key
Colour	Result
Gold	Winner
Silver	2nd place
Bronze	3rd place
Green	Points finish
Blue	Non-points finish
Blue	Non-classified finish (NC)
Purple	Did not finish (Ret)
Black	Excluded (EX)
Black	Disqualified (DSQ)
White	Did not start (DNS)
White	Cancelled (C)
Blank	Withdrew entry from the event (WD)

Notes:
^{1 2 3} – Indicate position on Power stage

=== FIA World Rally Championship for Co-Drivers ===
Points are awarded to the top ten classified finishers. There are also three bonus points awarded to the winner of the Power stage, two points for second place and one for third.

Position	1st	2nd	3rd	4th	5th	6th	7th	8th	9th	10th
Points	25	18	15	12	10	8	6	4	2	1

Pos.	Co-driver	MON (Monaco)	SWE (Sweden)	MEX (Mexico)	ARG (Argentina)	POR (Portugal)	ITA (Italy)	POL (Poland)	FIN (Finland)	GER (Germany)	CHN (China)	FRA (France)	ESP (Spain)	GBR (United Kingdom)	AUS (Australia)	Points
1	(France) Julien Ingrassia	1^{1}	1^{1}	2^{1}	2^{3}	3^{1}	3^{1}	6^{1}	24	1^{3}	C	1^{3}	1^{2}	1	2^{1}	268
2	(Belgium) Nicolas Gilsoul	3	14	Ret	6	29	1	4^{3}	4^{1}	3^{1}	C	2	3	3^{3}	3^{2}	160
3	(Norway) Anders Jæger	2^{3}	4^{2}	Ret	3	2^{3}	13	1	7	4	C	3^{2}	Ret	12^{2}	1	154
4	(New Zealand) John Kennard	25	2	5^{3}	1^{1}	Ret	Ret	3	5^{2}	5	C	6	4	4	4	138
5	(Spain) Marc Martí	6^{2}	6	4	4^{2}	4	4	Ret	WD	2	C	7	2^{3}	6	5^{3}	130
6	(Finland) Miikka Anttila	Ret	26	1^{2}	16	6^{2}	2^{3}	5^{2}	2^{3}	48^{2}	C	4	14^{1}	7	9	112
7	(Norway) Ola Fløene	4	3	3	5	7	Ret	8	6	6	C	9	5	8	6	102
8	(Estonia) Raigo Mõlder	7	5	6	15	Ret	5	2	Ret	23	C	10	6	2^{1}	7	88
9	(Republic of Ireland) Paul Nagle	Ret	23^{3}			1			1		C	16^{1}	Ret	5		64
10	(United Kingdom) Scott Martin		8					7	3		C	5	10	Ret		36
11	(France) Benjamin Veillas			16	8	5	6	10	Ret	50	C	8	19	10	Ret	28
12	(Finland) Janne Ferm	9	12				21	14	8	7	C			11	8	16
13	(Austria) Ilka Minor		7		9	27	7	15	12		C			WD		14
14	(France) Gabin Moreau	5				35		9		Ret	C					12
15	(Czech Republic) Jan Tománek			7		8	9				C		Ret			12
16	(United Kingdom) Sebastian Marshall					Ret	15^{2}		9		C	Ret	7	Ret		10
17	(Sweden) Jonas Andersson	19	11			9		19	Ret	8	C		9	13		8
18	(Finland) Mikko Markkula	12	10	9		45	8	11	10	56	C	15	28	14		8
19	(Czech Republic) Pavel Dresler					19	10			9	C	12	8	16	WD	7
20	(Argentina) Rubén García				7				44		C					6
21	(United Kingdom) Craig Parry	8	9		17	30		13	11		C	11		WD		6
22	(Italy) Simone Scattolin	Ret	Ret	8	13	WD	Ret	12	Ret	WD	C	17	11	15	10	5
23	(France) Gilles De Turckheim										C			9		2
24	(Germany) Pirmin Winklhofer	10		19			12	Ret		10	C		Ret			2
25	(Argentina) Fernando Mussano			14	10	10	Ret	20			C			21	11	2
26	(Ukraine) Volodymyr Korsia		24	10	Ret	Ret	28	27	21		C		15	37		1
Pos.	Co-driver	MON (Monaco)	SWE (Sweden)	MEX (Mexico)	ARG (Argentina)	POR (Portugal)	ITA (Italy)	POL (Poland)	FIN (Finland)	GER (Germany)	CHN (China)	FRA (France)	ESP (Spain)	GBR (United Kingdom)	AUS (Australia)	Points

Key
Colour	Result
Gold	Winner
Silver	2nd place
Bronze	3rd place
Green	Points finish
Blue	Non-points finish
Blue	Non-classified finish (NC)
Purple	Did not finish (Ret)
Black	Excluded (EX)
Black	Disqualified (DSQ)
White	Did not start (DNS)
White	Cancelled (C)
Blank	Withdrew entry from the event (WD)

Notes:
^{1 2 3} – Indicate position on Power stage

=== FIA World Rally Championship for Manufacturers ===
Points are awarded to the top ten classified finishers.

Position	1st	2nd	3rd	4th	5th	6th	7th	8th	9th	10th
Points	25	18	15	12	10	8	6	4	2	1

Pos.	Manufacturer	No.	MON (Monaco)	SWE (Sweden)	MEX (Mexico)	ARG (Argentina)	POR (Portugal)	ITA (Italy)	POL (Poland)	FIN (Finland)	GER (Germany)	CHN (China)	FRA (France)	ESP (Spain)	GBR (United Kingdom)	AUS (Australia)	Points
1	(Germany) Volkswagen Motorsport	1	1	1	2	2	2	3	6	7	1	C	1	1	1	2	377
1	(Germany) Volkswagen Motorsport	2	Ret	8	1	9	5	2	5	1	8	C	4	8	6	8	377
2	(South Korea) Hyundai Motorsport	3	3	7	Ret	6	Ret	Ret	4	2	3	C	2	3	3	3	312
2	(South Korea) Hyundai Motorsport	4	5	2	4	4	3	4	3	3	2	C	6	2	5	4	312
3	(Germany) Volkswagen Motorsport II	9	2	4	Ret	3	1	8	1	5	4	C	3	Ret	9	1	163
4	(United Kingdom) M-Sport World Rally Team	5	4	3	3	5	6	Ret	7	4	6	C	8	5	7	6	162
4	(United Kingdom) M-Sport World Rally Team	6	Ret	Ret	8	7	4	6	8	Ret	9	C	7	9	8	Ret	162
5	(South Korea) Hyundai Motorsport N	10	7				Ret	9				C		7			146
5	(South Korea) Hyundai Motorsport N	20		6	5	1	9	1	Ret	6	5	C	5	4	4	5	146
6	(United Kingdom) DMACK World Rally Team	12	6	5	6	8	Ret	5	2	Ret	7	C	9	6	2	7	98
7	(Czech Republic) Jipocar Czech National Team	21			7		7	7				C		Ret			18
8	(Saudi Arabia) Yazeed Racing	30		Ret			8	Ret	Ret	Ret		C			Ret		4
Pos.	Manufacturer	No.	MON (Monaco)	SWE (Sweden)	MEX (Mexico)	ARG (Argentina)	POR (Portugal)	ITA (Italy)	POL (Poland)	FIN (Finland)	GER (Germany)	CHN (China)	FRA (France)	ESP (Spain)	GBR (United Kingdom)	AUS (Australia)	Points

Key
Colour	Result
Gold	Winner
Silver	2nd place
Bronze	3rd place
Green	Points finish
Blue	Non-points finish
Blue	Non-classified finish (NC)
Purple	Did not finish (Ret)
Black	Excluded (EX)
Black	Disqualified (DSQ)
White	Did not start (DNS)
White	Cancelled (C)
Blank	Withdrew entry from the event (WD)
