= 2014 Monte Carlo Rally =

82nd running of the Monte Carlo Rally

2014 Monte Carlo Rally 82ème Rallye Automobile Monte-Carlo
Round 1 of 13 of the 2014 World Rally Championship
Next event →
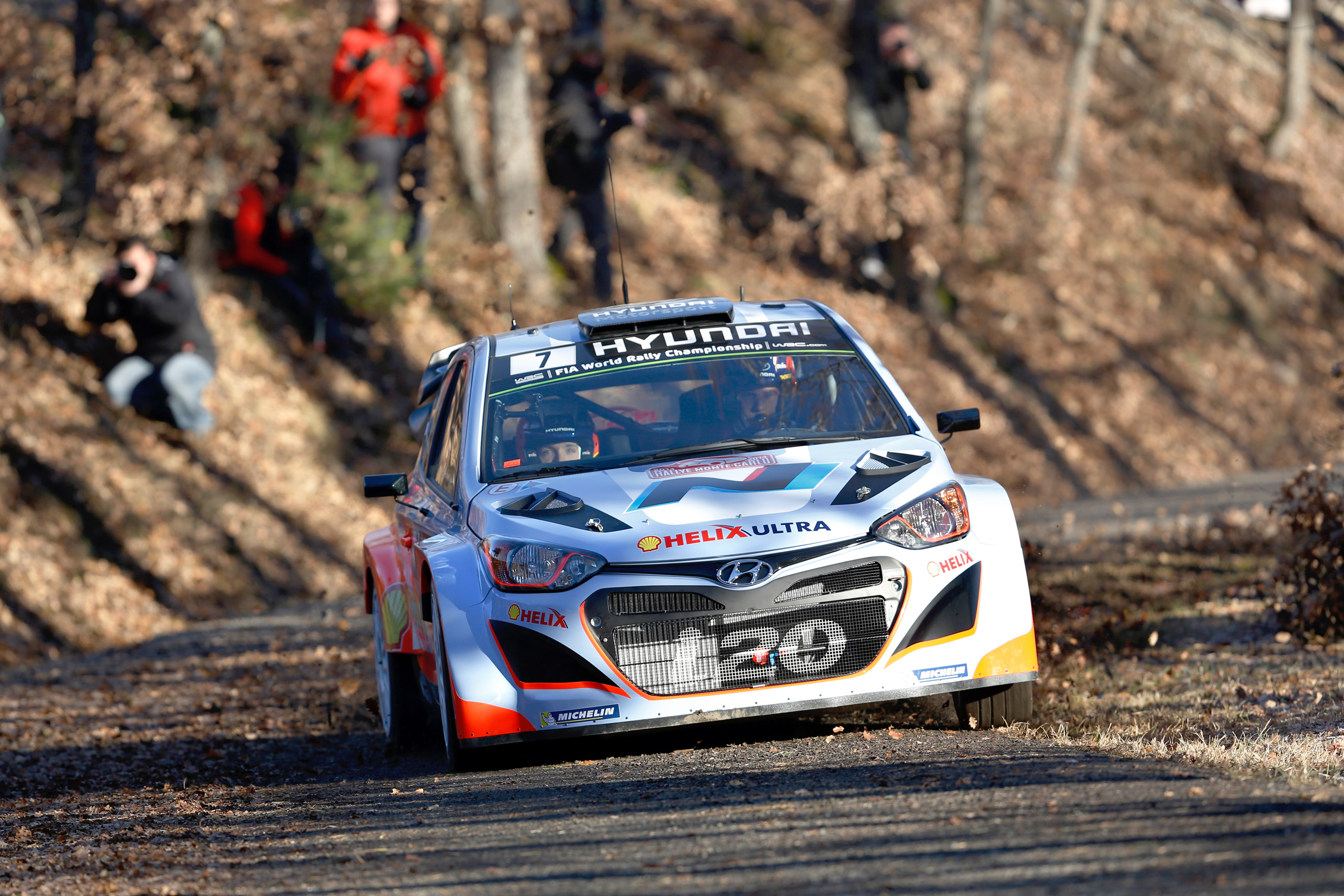
- Host country: Monaco
- Rally base: (France) Gap, Hautes-Alpes
- Dates run: 16 – 18 January 2014
- Stages: 15 (383.88 km; 238.53 miles)
- Stage surface: Tarmac and snow

Statistics
- Crews: 98 at start, 40 at finish

Overall results
- Overall winner: (France) Sébastien Ogier (France) Julien Ingrassia (Germany) Volkswagen Motorsport

The 2014 Monte Carlo Rally (formally known as the 82ème Rallye Automobile Monte-Carlo) is a motor racing event for rally cars that was held over three days between 14 and 18 January 2014. It marked the eighty-second running of the Monte Carlo Rally, and was the first round of the 2014 World Rally Championship, WRC-2 and WRC-3 seasons. After being based in the town of Valence for the 2013 event, the rally headquarters was relocated to Gap in the French province of Hautes-Alpes. The rally itself was run over fifteen special stages, with teams and drivers contesting 383.88 km (238.53 mi) in competitive stages.

Former Formula 1 Driver Robert Kubica won the first two stages of the rally before being caught by Bryan Bouffier, who moved into the lead heading into the first days afternoon stages.

Bouffier led heading into the second day but was overtaken by Sebastian Ogier, following a lengthy spin on SS9. Kubica's rally ended on the same stage after sliding off the road under braking and being unable to recover onto the tarmac.

It was the first Monte Carlo Rally event since 2001 without Sebastien Loeb.

== Entry list ==
Notable entrants
No.	Entrant	Class	Driver	Co-driver	Car	Tyre
1	(Germany) Volkswagen Motorsport	WRC	(France) Sébastien Ogier	(France) Julien Ingrassia	Volkswagen Polo R WRC	MI
2	(Germany) Volkswagen Motorsport	WRC	(Finland) Jari-Matti Latvala	(Finland) Miikka Anttila	Volkswagen Polo R WRC	MI
3	(France) Citroën Total Abu Dhabi WRT	WRC	(United Kingdom) Kris Meeke	(Republic of Ireland) Paul Nagle	Citroën DS3 WRC	MI
4	(France) Citroën Total Abu Dhabi WRT	WRC	(Norway) Mads Østberg	(Sweden) Jonas Andersson	Citroën DS3 WRC	MI
5	(United Kingdom) M-Sport Ltd	WRC	(Finland) Mikko Hirvonen	(Finland) Jarmo Lehtinen	Ford Fiesta RS WRC	MI
6	(United Kingdom) M-Sport Ltd	WRC	(United Kingdom) Elfyn Evans	(United Kingdom) Daniel Barritt	Ford Fiesta RS WRC	MI
7	(Germany) Hyundai Motorsport	WRC	(Belgium) Thierry Neuville	(Belgium) Nicolas Gilsoul	Hyundai i20 WRC	MI
8	(Germany) Hyundai Motorsport	WRC	(Spain) Dani Sordo	(Spain) Marc Martí	Hyundai i20 WRC	MI
9	(Germany) Volkswagen Motorsport II	WRC	(Norway) Andreas Mikkelsen	(Finland) Mikko Markkula	Volkswagen Polo R WRC	MI
10	(United Kingdom) RK M-Sport World Rally Team	WRC	(Poland) Robert Kubica	(Poland) Maciej Szczepaniak	Ford Fiesta RS WRC	MI
11	(United Kingdom) M-Sport Ltd	WRC	(France) Bryan Bouffier	(France) Xavier Panseri	Ford Fiesta RS WRC	MI
12	(France) François Delecour	WRC	(France) François Delecour	(France) Dominique Savignoni	Ford Fiesta RS WRC	MI
21	(Czech Republic) Jipocar Czech National Team	WRC	(Czech Republic) Martin Prokop	(Czech Republic) Michal Ernst	Ford Fiesta RS WRC	MI
22	Slovakia World Rally Team	WRC	(Slovakia) Jaroslav Melichárek	(Slovakia) Erik Melichárek	Ford Fiesta RS WRC	MI
31	(Ukraine) Yuriy Protasov	WRC-2	(Ukraine) Yuriy Protasov	(Ukraine) Pavlo Cherepin	Ford Fiesta R5	MI
32	(Austria) Stohl Racing	WRC-2	(Germany) Armin Kremer	(Germany) Klaus Wicha	Ford Fiesta R5	P
33	(Italy) www.Rallyproject.com srl	WRC-2	(Italy) Massimiliano Rendina	(Italy) Mario Pizzuti	Mitsubishi Lancer Evo X	P
34	(Greece) Jourdan Serderidis	WRC-2	(Greece) Jourdan Serderidis	(Belgium) Morgane Rose	Ford Fiesta R5	P
35	(France) Julien Maurin	WRC-2	(France) Julien Maurin	(France) Nicolas Klinger	Ford Fiesta RRC	P
36	(Republic of Ireland) Robert Barrable	WRC-2	(Republic of Ireland) Robert Barrable	(United Kingdom) Stuart Loudon	Ford Fiesta R5	DM
37	(Italy) FWRT s.r.l.	WRC-2	(Italy) Lorenzo Bertelli	(Italy) Mitia Dotta	Ford Fiesta R5	P
38	(Switzerland) Olivier Burri		(Switzerland) Olivier Burri	(France) Fabrice Gordon	Ford Fiesta S2000	P
41	(Republic of Ireland) Eamonn Boland		(Republic of Ireland) Eamonn Boland	(Republic of Ireland) Michael Joseph Morrissey	Subaru Impreza STi R4	MI
42	(France) Michel Daumas		(France) Michel Daumas	(France) Eric Baille	Mitsubishi Lancer Evo IX	MI
43	(France) Jean Noël Mondet		(France) Jean Noël Mondet	(France) Sylvain Peirone	Mitsubishi Lancer Evo X	MI
44	(Netherlands) Jac Gillis		(Netherlands) Henk Vossen	(Netherlands) Jac Gillis	Mitsubishi Lancer Evo X	MI
45	(France) Mathieu Margaillan		(France) Mathieu Margaillan	(France) Mathilde Margaillan	Škoda Fabia S2000	P
46	(Italy) Carlo Covi		(Italy) Carlo Covi	(Italy) Giorgio Campesan	Peugeot 207 S2000	P
47	(France) Claude Carret		(France) Claude Carret	(France) Olivier Mathias	Subaru Impreza STi R4	MI
48	(Italy) Matteo Gamba		(Italy) Matteo Gamba	(Italy) Nicola Arena	Peugeot 207 S2000	HK
50	(Belgium) Marc Duez		(Belgium) Marc Duez	(Belgium) Steve Vyncke	Porsche 996 GT3	MI
51	(France) Quentin Gilbert	WRC-3	(France) Quentin Gilbert	(Belgium) Renaud Jamoul	Citroën DS3 R3T	MI
56	(France) Sébastien Chardonnet		(France) Sébastien Chardonnet	(France) Thibault De La Haye	Citroën DS3 R3T	MI
57	(France) Christophe Arnaud		(France) Christophe Arnaud	(France) Stéphane Arnaud	Renault Clio R3	MI
58	(France) Francis O´Mahony		(France) Francis O'Mahony	(France) Gilles Vernay	Peugeot 207 RC	MI
59	(France) Damien Oberti		(France) Damien Oberti	(France) Christophe Allioud Perraud	Citroën DS3 R3T	MI

Icon	Class
WRC	WRC entries eligible to score manufacturer points
WRC	Major entry ineligible to score manufacturer points
WRC-2	Registered to take part in WRC-2 championship
WRC-3	Registered to take part in WRC-3 championship

== Results ==
=== Event standings ===
Pos.	No.	Driver	Co-driver	Team	Car	Class	Time	Difference	Points
Overall classification
1	1	(France) Sébastien Ogier	(France) Julien Ingrassia	(Germany) Volkswagen Motorsport	Volkswagen Polo R WRC	WRC	3:55:14.4	0.0	27
2	11	(France) Bryan Bouffier	(France) Xavier Panseri	(United Kingdom) M-Sport WRT	Ford Fiesta RS WRC	WRC	3:56:33.3	+1:18.9	18
3	3	(United Kingdom) Kris Meeke	(Republic of Ireland) Paul Nagle	(France) Citroën Total Abu Dhabi WRT	Citroën DS3 WRC	WRC	3:57:08.7	+1:54.3	16
4	4	(Norway) Mads Østberg	(Sweden) Jonas Andersson	(France) Citroën Total Abu Dhabi WRT	Citroën DS3 WRC	WRC	3:59:08.3	+3:53.9	12
5	2	(Finland) Jari-Matti Latvala	(Finland) Miikka Anttila	(Germany) Volkswagen Motorsport	Volkswagen Polo R WRC	WRC	4:01:22.7	+6:08.3	13
6	6	(United Kingdom) Elfyn Evans	(United Kingdom) Daniel Barritt	(United Kingdom) M-Sport WRT	Ford Fiesta RS WRC	WRC	4:03:51.8	+8:37.4	8
7	9	(Norway) Andreas Mikkelsen	(Finland) Mikko Markkula	(Germany) Volkswagen Motorsport II	Volkswagen Polo R WRC	WRC	4:06:56.7	+11:42.3	6
8	22	(Slovakia) Jaroslav Melichárek	(Slovakia) Erik Melichárek	Slovakia WRT	Ford Fiesta RS WRC	WRC	4:17:10.6	+21:56.2	4
9	48	(Italy) Matteo Gamba	(Italy) Nicola Arena	(Italy) Matteo Gamba	Peugeot 207 S2000	—N/a	4:19:05.1	+23:50.7	2
10	31	(Ukraine) Yuriy Protasov	(Ukraine) Pavlo Cherepin	(Ukraine) Yuriy Protasov	Ford Fiesta R5	WRC-2	4:20:57.7	+25:43.1	1
WRC-2 standings
1 (10.)	31	(Ukraine) Yuriy Protasov	(Ukraine) Pavlo Cherepin	(Ukraine) Yuriy Protasov	Ford Fiesta R5	WRC-2	4:20:57.7	0.0	25
2 (12.)	37	(Italy) Lorenzo Bertelli	(Italy) Mitia Dotta	(Italy) FWRT s.r.l.	Ford Fiesta R5	WRC-2	4:28:47.9	+7:50.4	18
3 (13.)	36	(Republic of Ireland) Robert Barrable	(United Kingdom) Stuart Loudon	(Republic of Ireland) Robert Barrable	Ford Fiesta R5	WRC-2	4:30:22.3	+9:24.8	15
4 (17.)	32	(Germany) Armin Kremer	(Germany) Klaus Wicha	(Austria) Stohl Racing	Ford Fiesta R5	WRC-2	4:46:06.0	+25:10.3	12
5 (26.)	33	(Italy) Massimiliano Rendina	(Italy) Mario Pizzuti	(Italy) www.Rallyproject.com	Mitsubishi Lancer Evolution X	WRC-2	4:58:19.8	+38:07.1	10
6 (31.)	34	(Greece) Jourdan Serderidis	(Belgium) Morgane Rose	(Belgium) J-Motorsport	Ford Fiesta R5	WRC-2	5:04:47.0	+44:34.3	8
WRC-3 standings
1 (39.)	51	(France) Quentin Gilbert	(Belgium) Renaud Jamoul	(France) Quentin Gilbert	Citroen DS3 R3T	WRC-3	5:18:33.8	0.0	25

== Championship standings after the race ==
=== WRC ===
Drivers' Championship standings

Pos.	Driver	Points
1	(France) Sébastien Ogier	27
2	(France) Bryan Bouffier	18
3	(United Kingdom) Kris Meeke	16
4	(Finland) Jari-Matti Latvala	13
5	(Norway) Mads Østberg	12

Manufacturers' Championship standings

Pos.	Constructor	Points
1	(Germany) Volkswagen Motorsport	37
2	(France) Citroen Total Abu Dhabi WRT	33
3	(United Kingdom) M-Sport World Rally Team	10
4	(Germany) Volkswagen Motorsport II	8

=== Other ===
WRC2 Drivers' Championship standings

Pos.	Driver	Points
1	(Ukraine) Yuriy Protasov	25
2	(Italy) Lorenzo Bertelli	18
3	(Republic of Ireland) Robert Barrable	15
4	(Germany) Armin Kremer	12
5	(Italy) Massimiliano Rendina	10

WRC3 Drivers' Championship standings

Pos.	Constructor	Points
1	(France) Quentin Gilbert	25
