= 2015 Rallye Deutschland =

Motor racing event for rally cars

Rallye Deutschland 2015: 33. ADAC Rallye Deutschland
Round 9 of the 2015 World Rally Championship season
← Previous event	Next event →
- Host country: Germany
- Rally base: Trier, Germany
- Dates run: 20 – 23 August 2015
- Stages: 21 (374.43 km; 232.66 miles)
- Stage surface: Tarmac

Statistics
- Crews: 74 at start, 56 at finish

Overall results
- Overall winner: (France) Sébastien Ogier (France) Julien Ingrassia (Germany) Volkswagen Motorsport

The 2015 Rallye Deutschland was a motor racing event for rally cars that was held over four days between 20 and 23 August 2015. It marked the 33rd running of the Rallye Deutschland, and was the ninth round of the 2015 season for the World Rally Championship, WRC-2, WRC-3 championships, as well as the third round of the FIA R-GT Cup.

== Entry list ==
The following competitors entered in to the Rallye Deutschland.

World Rally Car entries competing in the World Rally Championship
No.	Driver	Co-Driver	Entrant	Car	Tyre
1	(France) Sébastien Ogier	(France) Julien Ingrassia	(Germany) Volkswagen Motorsport	Volkswagen Polo R WRC	MI
2	(Finland) Jari-Matti Latvala	(Finland) Miikka Anttila	(Germany) Volkswagen Motorsport	Volkswagen Polo R WRC	MI
3	(United Kingdom) Kris Meeke	(Republic of Ireland) Paul Nagle	(France) Citroën Total Abu Dhabi WRT	Citroën DS3 WRC	MI
4	(Norway) Mads Østberg	(Sweden) Jonas Andersson	(France) Citroën Total Abu Dhabi WRT	Citroën DS3 WRC	MI
5	(United Kingdom) Elfyn Evans	(United Kingdom) Daniel Barritt	(United Kingdom) M-Sport World Rally Team	Ford Fiesta RS WRC	MI
6	(Estonia) Ott Tänak	(Estonia) Raigo Mõlder	(United Kingdom) M-Sport World Rally Team	Ford Fiesta RS WRC	MI
7	(Belgium) Thierry Neuville	(Belgium) Nicolas Gilsoul	(South Korea) Hyundai Motorsport	Hyundai i20 WRC	MI
8	(Spain) Dani Sordo	(Spain) Marc Martí	(South Korea) Hyundai Motorsport	Hyundai i20 WRC	MI
9	(Norway) Andreas Mikkelsen	(Norway) Ola Fløene	(Germany) Volkswagen Motorsport II	Volkswagen Polo R WRC	MI
10	(Netherlands) Kevin Abbring	(United Kingdom) Sebastian Marshall	(South Korea) Hyundai Motorsport N	Hyundai i20 WRC	MI
12	(France) Stephane Lefebvre	(Belgium) Stéphane Prévot	(France) Citroën Total Abu Dhabi WRT	Citroën DS3 WRC	MI
14	(Poland) Robert Kubica	(Poland) Maciej Szczepaniak	(Poland) Robert Kubica	Ford Fiesta RS WRC	P
20	(New Zealand) Hayden Paddon	(New Zealand) John Kennard	(South Korea) Hyundai Motorsport N	Hyundai i20 WRC	MI
21	(Czech Republic) Martin Prokop	(Czech Republic) Jan Tománek	(Czech Republic) Jipocar Czech National Team	Ford Fiesta RS WRC	P
22	(Slovakia) Jaroslav Melichárek	(Slovakia) Erik Melichárek	(Slovakia) Jaroslav Melichárek	Ford Fiesta RS WRC	P

R4, R5, or Super 2000 entries competing in the World Rally Championship 2
No.	Driver	Co-Driver	Entrant	Car	Tyre
33	(Italy) Max Rendina	(Italy) Emanuele Inglesi	(Italy) Mitsubishi Italia	Mitsubishi Lancer Evo X	P
34	(France) Quentin Giordano	(France) Valentin Sarreaud	(France) Quentin Giordano	Citroën DS3 RRC	P
35	(Greece) Jourdan Serderidis	(Belgium) Frédéric Miclotte	(Greece) Jourdan Serderidis	Citroën DS3 R5	MI
38	(Qatar) Nasser Al-Attiyah	(France) Mathieu Baumel	(Qatar) Nasser Al-Attiyah	Škoda Fabia R5	MI
39	(Finland) Esapekka Lappi	(Finland) Janne Ferm	(Czech Republic) Škoda Motorsport	Škoda Fabia R5	MI
40	(Germany) Armin Kremer	(Germany) Pirmin Winklhofer	(Austria) BRR Baumschlager Rallye & Racing Team	Škoda Fabia R5	P
42	(Republic of Ireland) Craig Breen	(United Kingdom) Scott Martin	(France) Saintéloc Junior Team	Peugeot 208 T16 R5	MI
43	(France) Julien Maurin	(France) Nicolas Klinger	(France) Julien Maurin	Ford Fiesta RRC	P
44	(France) Eric Camilli	(France) Benjamin Veillas	(France) Team ORECA	Ford Fiesta R5	MI
45	(Czech Republic) Jan Kopecký	(Czech Republic) Pavel Dresler	(Czech Republic) Škoda Motorsport	Škoda Fabia R5	MI
47	(Switzerland) Jonathan Hirschi	(France) Vincent Landais	(Switzerland) Jonathan Hirschi	Peugeot 208 T16 R5	P
48	(Germany) Fabian Kreim	(Germany) Frank Christian	(Germany) Škoda Auto Deutschland	Škoda Fabia R5	P
49	(Slovakia) Martin Koči	(Czech Republic) Lukáš Kostka	Peugeot Sport Slovakia	Peugeot 208 T16 R5	MI
50	(Spain) Nil Solans	(Spain) Miquel Ibáñez	(Spain) ACSM Rallye Team	Peugeot 208 T16 R5	HK
70	(Russia) Dmitri Biryukov	(Russia) Evgeny Kalachev	(Finland) TGS Worldwide	Škoda Fabia S2000	?
71	(Andorra) Joan Carchat	(Andorra) Claudi Ribeiro	(Spain) ACSM Rallye Team	Mitsubishi Lancer Evo X	?
73	(Republic of Ireland) Eamonn Boland	(Republic of Ireland) Michael Joseph Morrissey	(Republic of Ireland) Eamonn Boland	Subaru Impreza STi N16	?
74	(Italy) Enrico Brazzoli	(Italy) Maurizio Barone	(Italy) Enrico Brazzoli	Subaru Impreza STi N14	?
76	(Finland) Teemu Suninen	(Finland) Mikko Markkula	(France) Team ORECA	Ford Fiesta R5	MI

R2 or R3 entries competing in the World Rally Championship 3
No.	Driver	Co-Driver	Entrant	Car	Tyre
75	(Italy) Andrea Crugnola	(Italy) Michele Ferrara	(France) Renault Sport Technologies	Renault Clio R3T	MI

== Results ==
Defending champion Sébastien Ogier won the rally by 23 seconds ahead of his Volkswagen Motorsport teammate Jari-Matti Latvala, to extend his championship lead to 93 points. The podium was completed by another Volkswagen driver, Andreas Mikkelsen. In the supporting classes, Jan Kopecký won in WRC-2, Andrea Crugnola took the WRC-3 honours while the FIA R-GT Cup class was won by Romain Dumas.

=== Overall standings ===
Pos.	No.	Driver	Co-driver	Team	Car	Class	Time	Difference	Points
Overall classification
1	1	(France) Sébastien Ogier	(France) Julien Ingrassia	(Germany) Volkswagen Motorsport	Volkswagen Polo R WRC	WRC	3:35:49.5		25
2	2	(Finland) Jari-Matti Latvala	(Finland) Miikka Anttila	(Germany) Volkswagen Motorsport	Volkswagen Polo R WRC	WRC	3:36:12.5	+23.0	21
3	9	(Norway) Andreas Mikkelsen	(Finland) Mikko Markkula	(Germany) Volkswagen Motorsport II	Volkswagen Polo R WRC	WRC	3:37:46.1	+1:56.6	15
4	8	(Spain) Dani Sordo	(Spain) Marc Martí	(Germany) Hyundai Motorsport	Hyundai i20 WRC	WRC	3:37:58.8	+2:09.3	13
5	7	(Belgium) Thierry Neuville	(Belgium) Nicolas Gilsoul	(Germany) Hyundai Motorsport	Hyundai i20 WRC	WRC	3:38:23.3	+2:33.8	10
6	5	(United Kingdom) Elfyn Evans	(United Kingdom) Daniel Barritt	(United Kingdom) M-Sport World Rally Team	Ford Fiesta RS WRC	WRC	3:38:41.6	+2:52.1	8
7	4	(Norway) Mads Østberg	(Sweden) Jonas Andersson	(France) Citroën Total Abu Dhabi WRT	Citroën DS3 WRC	WRC	3:39:02.0	+3:12.5	6
8	6	(Estonia) Ott Tänak	(Estonia) Raigo Mõlder	(United Kingdom) M-Sport World Rally Team	Ford Fiesta RS WRC	WRC	3:40:16.1	+4:26.6	4
9	20	(New Zealand) Hayden Paddon	(New Zealand) John Kennard	(Germany) Hyundai Shell World Rally Team	Hyundai i20 WRC	WRC	3:40:36.3	+4:46.8	2
10	12	(France) Stéphane Lefebvre	(Belgium) Stéphane Prévot	(France) Citroën Total Abu Dhabi WRT	Citroën DS3 WRC	WRC	3:40:44.0	+4:54.5	1
12	3	(United Kingdom) Kris Meeke	(Republic of Ireland) Paul Nagle	(France) Citroën Total Abu Dhabi WRT	Citroën DS3 WRC	WRC	3:46:50.2	+11:00.7	2

=== Stage times ===
Day	Stage number	Stage name	Length	Stage winner	Car No.	Team	Time	Rally leader
21 Aug	SS1	Sauertal 1	14.84 km	(France) Sébastien Ogier (France) Julien Ingrassia	1	(Germany) Volkswagen Motorsport	7:58.4	(France) Sébastien Ogier (France) Julien Ingrassia
21 Aug	SS2	Waxweiler 1	16.40 km	(France) Sébastien Ogier (France) Julien Ingrassia	1	(Germany) Volkswagen Motorsport	9:33.1	(France) Sébastien Ogier (France) Julien Ingrassia
21 Aug	SS3	Moselland 1	23.24 km	(Finland) Jari-Matti Latvala (Finland) Miikka Anttila	2	(Germany) Volkswagen Motorsport	14:01.1	(Finland) Jari-Matti Latvala (Finland) Miikka Anttila
21 Aug	SS4	Mittelmosel 1	13.67 km	(France) Sébastien Ogier (France) Julien Ingrassia	1	(Germany) Volkswagen Motorsport	8:06.9	(Finland) Jari-Matti Latvala (Finland) Miikka Anttila
21 Aug	SS5	Sauertal 2	14.84 km	(France) Sébastien Ogier (France) Julien Ingrassia	1	(Germany) Volkswagen Motorsport	7:56.4	(France) Sébastien Ogier (France) Julien Ingrassia
21 Aug	SS6	Waxweiler 2	16.40 km	(France) Sébastien Ogier (France) Julien Ingrassia	1	(Germany) Volkswagen Motorsport	9:38.5	(France) Sébastien Ogier (France) Julien Ingrassia
21 Aug	SS7	Moselland 2	23.24 km	(France) Sébastien Ogier (France) Julien Ingrassia	1	(Germany) Volkswagen Motorsport	13:54.2	(France) Sébastien Ogier (France) Julien Ingrassia
21 Aug	SS8	Mittelmosel 2	13.67 km	(France) Sébastien Ogier (France) Julien Ingrassia	1	(Germany) Volkswagen Motorsport	8:02.6	(France) Sébastien Ogier (France) Julien Ingrassia
22 Aug	SS9	Grafschaft 1	18.35 km	(France) Sébastien Ogier (France) Julien Ingrassia	1	(Germany) Volkswagen Motorsport	10:44.1	(France) Sébastien Ogier (France) Julien Ingrassia
22 Aug	SS10	Bosenberg 1	17.13 km	(Finland) Jari-Matti Latvala (Finland) Miikka Anttila	2	(Germany) Volkswagen Motorsport	9:14.9	(France) Sébastien Ogier (France) Julien Ingrassia
22 Aug	SS11	Arena Panzerplatte 1	2.87 km	(France) Sébastien Ogier (France) Julien Ingrassia	1	(Germany) Volkswagen Motorsport	1:46.5	(France) Sébastien Ogier (France) Julien Ingrassia
22 Aug	SS12	Arena Panzerplatte 2	2.87 km	(France) Sébastien Ogier (France) Julien Ingrassia	1	(Germany) Volkswagen Motorsport	1:45.6	(France) Sébastien Ogier (France) Julien Ingrassia
22 Aug	SS13	Panzerplatte Long 1	45.61 km	(France) Sébastien Ogier (France) Julien Ingrassia	1	(Germany) Volkswagen Motorsport	25:39.1	(France) Sébastien Ogier (France) Julien Ingrassia
22 Aug	SS14	Grafschaft 2	18.35 km	(Finland) Jari-Matti Latvala (Finland) Miikka Anttila	2	(Germany) Volkswagen Motorsport	10:41.2	(France) Sébastien Ogier (France) Julien Ingrassia
22 Aug	SS15	Arena Panzerplatte 3	2.87 km	(Finland) Jari-Matti Latvala (Finland) Miikka Anttila	2	(Germany) Volkswagen Motorsport	1:45.7	(France) Sébastien Ogier (France) Julien Ingrassia
22 Aug	SS16	Panzerplatte Long 2	45.61 km	(France) Sébastien Ogier (France) Julien Ingrassia	1	(Germany) Volkswagen Motorsport	25:34.0	(France) Sébastien Ogier (France) Julien Ingrassia
22 Aug	SS17	Bosenberg 2	17.13 km	(France) Sébastien Ogier (France) Julien Ingrassia	1	(Germany) Volkswagen Motorsport	9:13.6	(France) Sébastien Ogier (France) Julien Ingrassia
23 Aug	SS18	Stein & Wein 1	19.59 km	(United Kingdom) Elfyn Evans (United Kingdom) Daniel Barritt	5	(United Kingdom) M-Sport World Rally Team	10:48.0	(France) Sébastien Ogier (France) Julien Ingrassia
23 Aug	SS19	Dhrontal 1	14.08 km	(Finland) Jari-Matti Latvala (Finland) Miikka Anttila	2	(Germany) Volkswagen Motorsport	9:10.5	(France) Sébastien Ogier (France) Julien Ingrassia
23 Aug	SS20	Stein & Wein 2	19.59 km	(France) Sébastien Ogier (France) Julien Ingrassia	1	(Germany) Volkswagen Motorsport	10:45.7	(France) Sébastien Ogier (France) Julien Ingrassia
23 Aug	SS21	Dhrontal 2 (Power Stage)	14.08 km	(Finland) Jari-Matti Latvala (Finland) Miikka Anttila	2	(Germany) Volkswagen Motorsport	9:07.4	(France) Sébastien Ogier (France) Julien Ingrassia
