= Jaroslav Melichárek =

Slovak rally driver (born 1977)

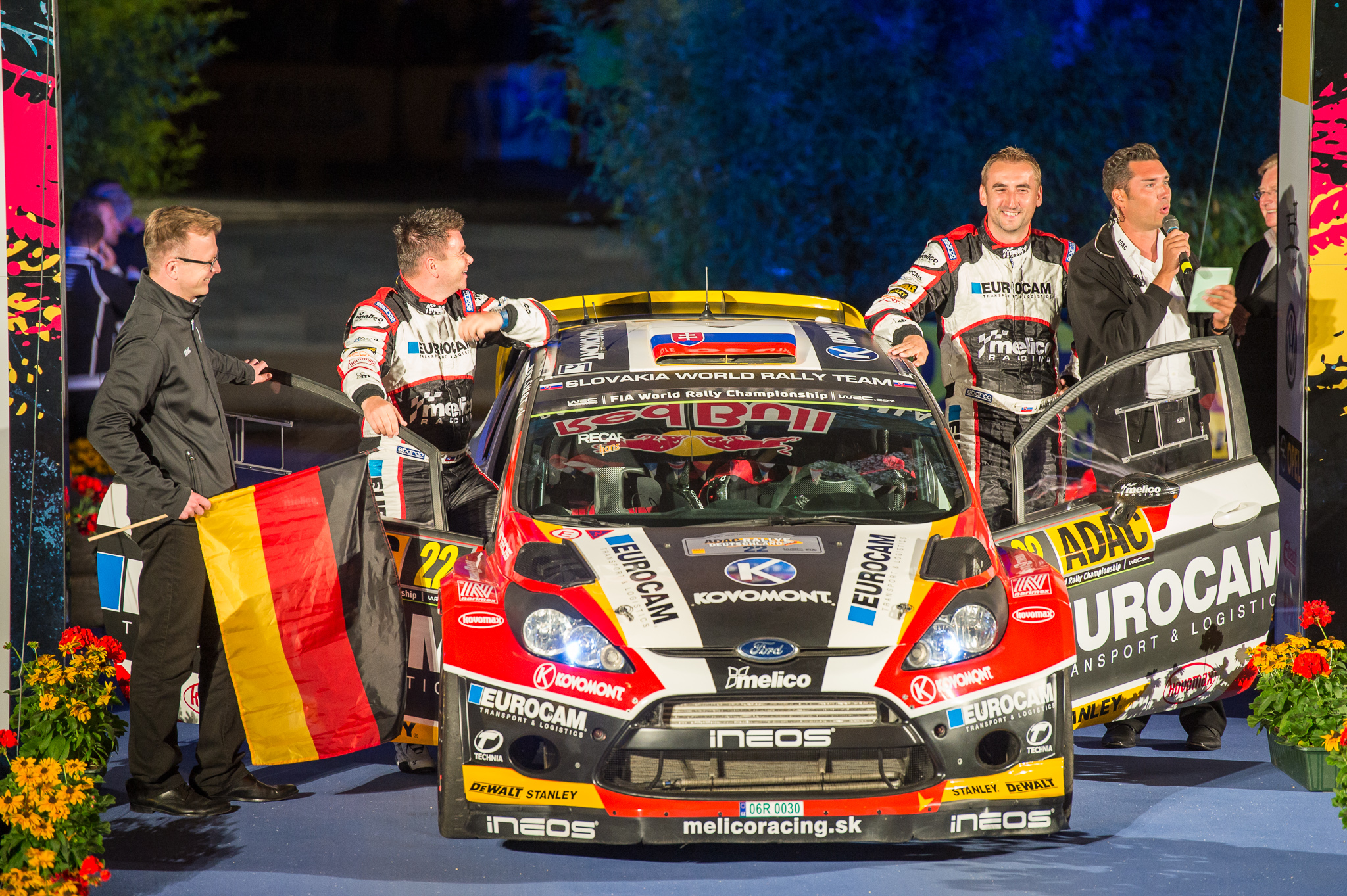
- Melichárek, third from right (in race suit)

Personal information
- Nationality: (Slovakia) Slovak
- Born: 22 December 1977 (age 48)

World Rally Championship record
- Years active: 2011–2016
- Rallies: 10
- Championships: 0
- Rally wins: 0
- Podiums: 0
- Stage wins: 0
- Total points: 4
- First rally: 2011 Rallye Deutschland
- Last rally: 2016 Rally de Portugal

Jaroslav Melichárek (born 22 December 1977) is rally driver from Slovakia. As of December 2013 he had made 58 starts. He became Slovak Rally Champion in 2015.

== Career results ==
=== WRC results ===
Year	Entrant	Car	1	2	3	4	5	6	7	8	9	10	11	12	13	Pos.	Points
2011	Jaroslav Melichárek	Mitsubishi Lancer Evo IX	SWE	MEX	POR	JOR	ITA	ARG	GRE	FIN	GER; 42	AUS	FRA	ESP	GBR	NC	0
2012	Jaroslav Melichárek	Peugeot 207 S2000	MON; 21	SWE	MEX	POR	ARG	GRE	NZL	FIN						NC	0
2012	Jaroslav Melichárek	Škoda Fabia S2000									GER; 17	GBR	FRA	ITA		NC	0
2012	Jaroslav Melichárek	Mitsubishi Lancer Evo IX													ESP; 26	NC	0
2013	Jaroslav Melichárek	Subaru Impreza STi R4	MON	SWE	MEX	POR	ARG	GRE	ITA	FIN	GER	AUS	FRA	ESP; 36	GBR	NC	0
2014	Slovakia World Rally Team	Ford Fiesta RS WRC	MON; 8	SWE	MEX	POR	ARG	ITA; 19	POL	FIN	GER; 14	AUS	FRA	ESP	GBR	21st	4
