= Slovak Rally Championship =

- Country: Slovakia
- Inaugural season: 1994
- Drivers' champion: (Czech Republic) Pavel Valoušek
- Official website: rallye.sk

The Slovak Rally Championship is a rallying series based in the Slovakia. The first championship was run in 1994.

== Slovak Rally Championship ==
=== Champions ===
Season	Champion	Co-Driver	Car	Team
2026	(Slovakia) Martin Koči	(Czech Republic) Petr Tešinský	Škoda Fabia RS Rally2	Styllex motorsport
2025	(Slovakia) Jaroslav Melichárek	(Slovakia) Erik Melichárek	Škoda Fabia RS Rally2	Melico Racing
2024	(Slovakia) Jaroslav Melichárek	(Slovakia) Erik Melichárek	Škoda Fabia RS Rally2	Melico Racing
2023	(Slovakia) Jaroslav Melichárek	(Slovakia) Erik Melichárek	Ford Fiesta RS WRC	Melico Racing
2022	(Poland) Grzegorz Grzyb	(Poland) Adam Binięda	Škoda Fabia Rally2 evo	Rufa Motor-Sport
2021	(Poland) Grzegorz Grzyb	(Poland) Michał Poradzisz	Škoda Fabia Rally2 evo	Rufa Sport
2020	(Poland) Grzegorz Grzyb	(Poland) Michał Poradzisz	Škoda Fabia Rally2 evo	Rufa Sport
2019	(Slovakia) Martin Koči	(Slovakia) Radovan Mozner	Škoda Fabia R5	Škoda Slovakia Motorsport
2018	(Slovakia) Martin Koči	(Slovakia) Radovan Mozner	Škoda Fabia R5	Škoda Slovakia Motorsport
2017	(Czech Republic) Pavel Valoušek	(Czech Republic) Veronika Havelková	Ford Fiesta R5	Icari Rally Team
2016	(Czech Republic) Pavel Valoušek	(Czech Republic) Veronika Havelková	Škoda Fabia R5	Energy Oil Motorsport
2015	(Slovakia) Jaroslav Melichárek	(Slovakia) Erik Melichárek	Ford Fiesta RS WRC	Melico Racing
2014	(Poland) Grzegorz Grzyb	(Poland) Robert Hundla	Škoda Fabia S2000	Rufa Sport
2013	(Poland) Grzegorz Grzyb	(Poland) Robert Hundla	Škoda Fabia S2000/Ford Focus RS WRC '08	Rufa Sport
2012	(Poland) Grzegorz Grzyb	(Poland) Robert Hundla	Peugeot 207 S2000	Rufa Sport
2011	(Slovakia) Jozef Béreš jun.	(Slovakia) Róbert Müller	Škoda Fabia S2000	Styllex Motorsport s.r.o.
2010	(Slovakia) Jozef Béreš jun.	(Slovakia) Róbert Müller	Škoda Fabia S2000	Styllex Motorsport s.r.o.
2009	(Slovakia) Jozef Béreš jun.	(Slovakia) Róbert Müller	Peugeot 207 S2000	Styllex Motorsport s.r.o.
2008	(Slovakia) Jozef Béreš jun.	(Slovakia) Róbert Müller	Fiat Abarth Grande Punto S2000	Tempus Styllex
2007	(Czech Republic) Václav Pech	(Czech Republic) Petr Uhel	Mitsubishi Lancer Evo IX	Čedok Slovakia
2006	(Poland) Grzegorz Grzyb	(Poland) Robert Hundla	Mitsubishi Lancer Evo VIII	K.I.T. Racing CS
2005	(Slovakia) Jozef Béreš jun.	(Czech Republic) Petr Starý	Subaru Impreza STi	Styllex Tuning Motorsport
2004	(Slovakia) Tibor Cserhalmi	(Slovakia) Martin Krajňák	Mitsubishi Lancer Evo VII	Mimex Miva Motorsport
2003	(Czech Republic) Václav Pech	(Czech Republic) Petr Uhel	Ford Focus RS WRC '02	Mikona Slovnaft Rally Team
2002	(Czech Republic) Václav Pech	(Czech Republic) Petr Uhel	Ford Focus RS WRC '01	Mikona Slovnaft Rally Team
2001	(Poland) Janusz Kulig	(Slovakia) Emil Horniaček	Toyota Corolla WRC	AMK Mikona
2000	(Czech Republic) Stanislav Chovanec	(Czech Republic) Karel Holaň	Ford Escort RS Cosworth/Škoda Octavia WRC	Matador Rally Team
1999	(Czech Republic) Stanislav Chovanec	(Czech Republic) Karel Holaň	Ford Escort RS Cosworth	Matador Rally Team Slovakia
1998	(Italy) Enrico Bertone	(Slovakia) Michal Kočí	Toyota Celica GT-Four	Styllex Tuning Motorsport
1997	(Slovakia) Igor Drotár	(Slovakia) Vladimír Bánoci	Toyota Celica GT-Four	Complex Košice
1996	(Czech Republic) Stanislav Chovanec	(Czech Republic) Henrich Kurus	Ford Escort RS Cosworth	Matador Rally Team Slovakia
1995	(Slovakia) Jozef Béreš	(Slovakia) Michal Kočí	Ford Escort RS Cosworth	Styllex Tuning Motorsport
1994	(Slovakia) Jozef Béreš	(Slovakia) Michal Kočí	Nissan Sunny GTI-R	Styllex Tuning Motorsport

=== Multiple wins by individual ===
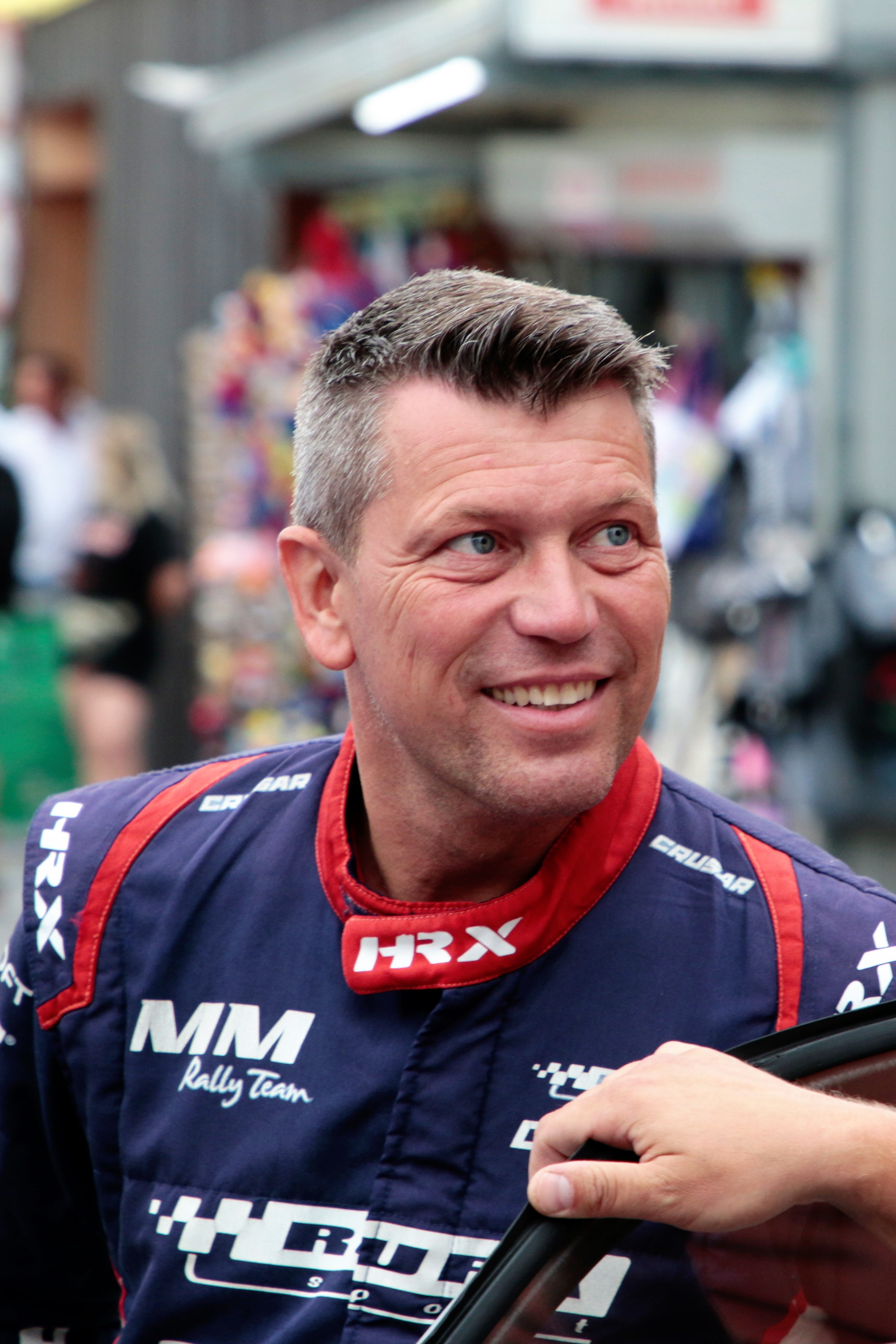
7 times champion Grzegorz Grzyb (pictured in 2022)

	Name	Titles	Winning years
(Poland)	Grzegorz Grzyb	7	2006, 2012, 2013, 2014, 2020, 2021, 2022
(Slovakia)	Jozef Béreš jun.	5	2005, 2008, 2009, 2010, 2011
(Czech Republic)	Stanislav Chovanec	3	1996, 1999, 2000
(Czech Republic)	Václav Pech	3	2002, 2003, 2007
(Slovakia)	Jozef Béreš sen.	2	1994, 1995
(Czech Republic)	Pavel Valoušek	2	2016, 2017
(Slovakia)	Martin Koči	2	2018, 2019
(Slovakia)	Jaroslav Melichárek	2	2015, 2023

=== Multiple wins by car manufacturer ===
	Name	Titles	Winning years
(Czech Republic)	Škoda Auto	11	2000, 2010, 2011, 2013, 2014, 2016, 2018, 2019, 2020, 2021, 2022
(United States)	Ford	10	1995, 1996, 1999, 2000, 2002, 2003, 2013, 2015, 2017, 2023
(Japan)	Mitsubishi Motors	3	2004, 2006, 2007
(Japan)	Toyota	3	1997, 1998, 2001
(France)	Peugeot	2	2009, 2012
