= 2014 Rally Italia Sardegna =

2014 motoring rally in Italy

2014 Rally Italia Sardegna Rally Italia Sardegna 2014
Round 6 of the 2014 World Rally Championship season
| ← Previous event | Next event → |
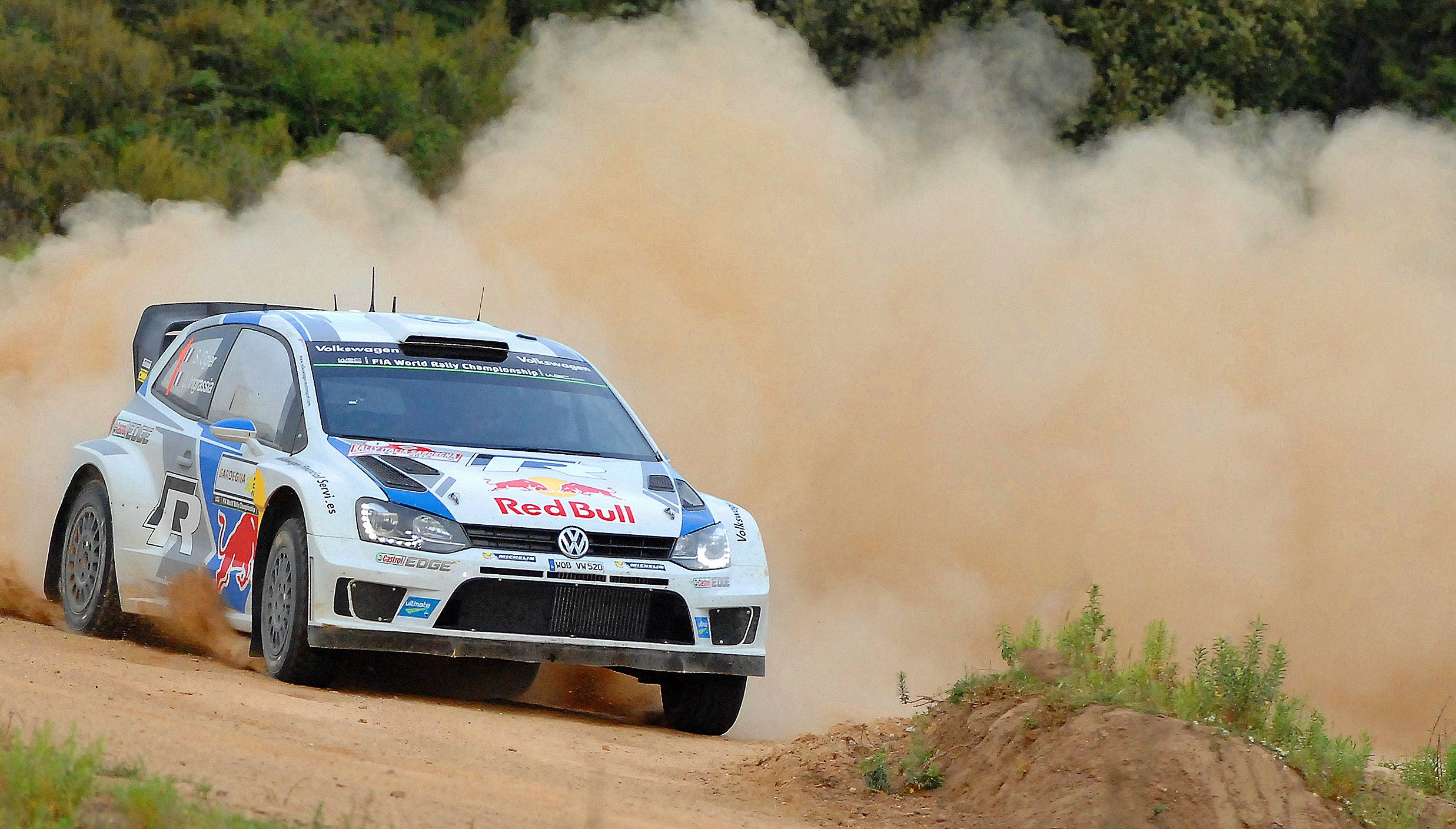
- Sébastien Ogier during Rally
- Host country: Italy
- Rally base: Alghero, Sardinia, Italy
- Dates run: June 5 – June 8, 2014
- Stages: 17 (364.54 km; 226.51 miles)
- Stage surface: Gravel

Statistics
- Crews: 57 at start, 39 at finish

Overall results
- Overall winner: (France) Sébastien Ogier (France) Julien Ingrassia (Germany) Volkswagen Motorsport

The 2014 Rally Italia Sardegna was the sixth round of the 2014 World Rally Championship season. The event was based in Alghero, Sardinia, and started on 5 June and finished on 8 June after seventeen special stages, totaling 364.5 competitive kilometres.

French driver Sébastien Ogier won the Rally Italia Sardegna for the second time in his career, taking his fourth win of eight victories during the 2014 season.

== Entry list ==
Entry List
| No. | Entrant | Class | Driver | Co-driver | Car | Tyre |
|---|---|---|---|---|---|---|
| 1 | (Germany) Volkswagen Motorsport | WRC | (France) Sébastien Ogier | (France) Julien Ingrassia | Volkswagen Polo R WRC | MI |
| 2 | (Germany) Volkswagen Motorsport | WRC | (Finland) Jari-Matti Latvala | (Finland) Miikka Anttila | Volkswagen Polo R WRC | MI |
| 3 | (France) Citroën Total Abu Dhabi WRT | WRC | (United Kingdom) Kris Meeke | (Republic of Ireland) Paul Nagle | Citroën DS3 WRC | MI |
| 4 | (France) Citroën Total Abu Dhabi WRT | WRC | (Norway) Mads Østberg | (Sweden) Jonas Andersson | Citroën DS3 WRC | MI |
| 5 | (United Kingdom) M-Sport World Rally Team | WRC | (Finland) Mikko Hirvonen | (Finland) Jarmo Lehtinen | Ford Fiesta RS WRC | MI |
| 6 | (United Kingdom) M-Sport World Rally Team | WRC | (United Kingdom) Elfyn Evans | (United Kingdom) Daniel Barritt | Ford Fiesta RS WRC | MI |
| 7 | (Germany) Hyundai Motorsport | WRC | (Belgium) Thierry Neuville | (Belgium) Nicolas Gilsoul | Hyundai i20 WRC | MI |
| 8 | (Germany) Hyundai Motorsport | WRC | (Finland) Juho Hänninen | (Finland) Tomi Tuominen | Hyundai i20 WRC | MI |
| 9 | (Germany) Volkswagen Motorsport II | WRC | (Norway) Andreas Mikkelsen | (Norway) Ola Fløene | Volkswagen Polo R WRC | MI |
| 10 | (United Kingdom) RK M-Sport World Rally Team | WRC | (Poland) Robert Kubica | (Poland) Maciej Szczepaniak | Ford Fiesta RS WRC | MI |
| 12 | (France) Citroën Total Abu Dhabi WRT | WRC | (United Arab Emirates) Khalid Al Qassimi | (United Kingdom) Chris Patterson | Citroën DS3 WRC | MI |
| 16 | (Norway) Adapta Motorsport | WRC | (Norway) Henning Solberg | (Austria) Ilka Minor | Ford Fiesta RS WRC | P |
| 20 | (Germany) Hyundai Motorsport N | WRC | (New Zealand) Hayden Paddon | (New Zealand) John Kennard | Hyundai i20 WRC | MI |
| 21 | (Czech Republic) Jipocar Czech National Team | WRC | (Czech Republic) Martin Prokop | (Czech Republic) Jan Tománek | Ford Fiesta RS WRC | MI |
| 22 | Slovakia World Rally Team | WRC | (Slovakia) Jaroslav Melichárek | (Slovakia) Erik Melichárek | Ford Fiesta RS WRC | DM |
| 31 | (Saudi Arabia) Yazeed Racing | WRC-2 | (Saudi Arabia) Yazeed Al-Rajhi | (United Kingdom) Michael Orr | Ford Fiesta RRC | MI |
| 32 | (Ukraine) Yuriy Protasov | WRC-2 | (Ukraine) Yuriy Protasov | (Ukraine) Pavlo Cherepin | Ford Fiesta RRC | P |
| 33 | (Italy) www.Rallyproject.com srl | WRC-2 | (Italy) Massimiliano Rendina | (Italy) Mario Pizzuti | Mitsubishi Lancer Evo X | P |
| 35 | (United Kingdom) Drive DMACK | WRC-2 | (Estonia) Ott Tänak | (Estonia) Raigo Mőlder | Ford Fiesta R5 | DM |
| 36 | (Estonia) Karl Kruuda | WRC-2 | (Estonia) Karl Kruuda | (Estonia) Martin Järveoja | Peugeot 208 T16 R5 | MI |
| 37 | (Italy) FWRT s.r.l. | WRC-2 | (Italy) Lorenzo Bertelli | (Italy) Mitia Dotta | Ford Fiesta RRC | P |
| 38 | (United Kingdom) Drive DMACK | WRC-2 | (France) Quentin Gilbert | (Belgium) Renaud Jamoul | Ford Fiesta R5 | DM |
| 39 | (Ukraine) Eurolamp World Rally Team | WRC-2 | (Ukraine) Valeriy Gorban | (Ukraine) Volodymyr Korsia | Mini John Cooper Works S2000 | MI |
| 40 | (Qatar) Nasser Al-Attiyah | WRC-2 | (Qatar) Nasser Al-Attiyah | (Italy) Giovanni Bernacchini | Ford Fiesta RRC | MI |
| 41 | (Peru) Nicolás Fuchs | WRC-2 | (Peru) Nicolás Fuchs | (Argentina) Fernando Mussano | Ford Fiesta R5 | DM |
| 42 | (Italy) Giuseppe Dettori | WRC-2 | (Italy) Giuseppe Dettori | (Italy) Carlo Pisano | Mitsubishi Lancer Evo IX | DM |
| 43 | (Portugal) Bernardo Sousa | WRC-2 | (Portugal) Bernardo Sousa | (Portugal) Hugo Magalhães | Ford Fiesta RRC | P |
| 44 | (France) Julien Maurin | WRC-2 | (France) Julien Maurin | (France) Nicolas Klinger | Ford Fiesta R5 | P |
| 47 | (Italy) Gianluca Linari | WRC-2 | (Italy) Gianluca Linari | (Italy) Nicola Arena | Subaru Impreza STi N15 | DM |
| 48 | (Ukraine) AT Rally Team | WRC-2 | (Estonia) Martin Kangur | (Poland) Paweł Drahan | Ford Fiesta S2000 | MI |
| 49 | (United Kingdom) Martin McCormack | WRC-2 | (United Kingdom) Martin McCormack | (Republic of Ireland) David Moynihan | Ford Fiesta R5 | HK |
| 72 | (Argentina) Juan Carlos Alonso | WRC-2 | (Argentina) Juan Carlos Alonso | (Argentina) Juan Pablo Monasterolo | Mitsubishi Lancer Evo X | DM |
| 73 | (Germany) Puma Rally Team | WRC-2 | (Qatar) Abdulaziz Al-Kuwari | (Republic of Ireland) Killian Duffy | Ford Fiesta RRC | MI |
| 74 | (Belgium) Top Teams by MY Racing | WRC-2 | (France) Sébastien Chardonnet | (France) Thibault de la Haye | Citroën DS3 R5 | MI |
| 76 | Sirbb Kuwait | WRC-2 | (Kuwait) Salah Bin Eidan | (Italy) Alex Gelsomino | Ford Fiesta R5 | DM |
| 78 | (Chile) Ramón Torres | WRC-2 | (Chile) Ramón Torres | (Argentina) José Díaz | Mitsubishi Lancer Evo X | DM |

| Icon | Class |
|---|---|
| WRC | WRC entries eligible to score manufacturer points |
| WRC | WRC entries ineligible to score manufacturer points |
| WRC-2 | Registered to take part in WRC-2 championship |

== Results ==
=== Event standings ===
| Pos. | No. | Driver | Co-driver | Team | Car | Class | Time | Difference | Points |
Overall classification
| 1 | 1 | (France) Sébastien Ogier | (France) Julien Ingrassia | (Germany) Volkswagen Motorsport | Volkswagen Polo R WRC | WRC | 4:02:37.8 | 0.00 | 26 |
| 2 | 4 | (Norway) Mads Østberg | (Sweden) Jonas Andersson | (France) Citroën Total Abu Dhabi WRT | Citroën DS3 WRC | WRC | 4:04:00.9 | +1:23.1 | 18 |
| 3 | 2 | (Finland) Jari-Matti Latvala | (Finland) Miikka Anttila | (Germany) Volkswagen Motorsport | Volkswagen Polo R WRC | WRC | 4:04:10.6 | +1:32.8 | 17 |
| 4 | 9 | (Norway) Andreas Mikkelsen | (Norway) Ola Fløene | (Germany) Volkswagen Motorsport II | Volkswagen Polo R WRC | WRC | 4:05:17.1 | +2:39.3 | 15 |
| 5 | 6 | (United Kingdom) Elfyn Evans | (United Kingdom) Daniel Barritt | (United Kingdom) M-Sport World Rally Team | Ford Fiesta RS WRC | WRC | 4:07:19.6 | +4:41.8 | 10 |
| 6 | 21 | (Czech Republic) Martin Prokop | (Czech Republic) Jan Tománek | (Czech Republic) Jipocar Czech National Team | Ford Fiesta RS WRC | WRC | 4:08:43.1 | +6:05.3 | 8 |
| 7 | 16 | (Norway) Henning Solberg | (Austria) Ilka Minor | (Norway) Adapta Motorsport | Ford Fiesta RS WRC | WRC | 4:09:53.6 | +7:15.8 | 6 |
| 8 | 10 | (Poland) Robert Kubica | (Poland) Maciek Szczepaniak | (United Kingdom) RK M-Sport World Rally Team | Ford Fiesta RS WRC | WRC | 4:14:56.8 | +12:19.0 | 4 |
| 9 | 37 | (Italy) Lorenzo Bertelli | (Italy) Mitia Dotta | (Italy) FWRT s.r.l. | Ford Fiesta RRC | WRC-2 | 4:17:59.9 | +15:22.1 | 2 |
| 10 | 12 | (United Arab Emirates) Khalid Al-Qassimi | (United Kingdom) Chris Patterson | (France) Citroën Total Abu Dhabi WRT | Citroën DS3 WRC | WRC | 4:19:27.1 | +16:49.3 | 1 |
WRC-2 standings
| 1 (9.) | 37 | (Italy) Lorenzo Bertelli | (Italy) Mitia Dotta | (Italy) FWRT s.r.l. | Ford Fiesta RRC | WRC-2 | 4:17:59.9 | 0.0 | 25 |
| 2 (11.) | 74 | (France) Sébastien Chardonnet | (France) Thibault de la Haye | (Belgium) Top Teams by MY Racing | Citroën DS3 R5 | WRC-2 | 4:20:111.5 | +2:11.6 | 18 |
| 3 (13.) | 32 | (Ukraine) Yuriy Protasov | (Ukraine) Pavlo Cherepin | (Ukraine) Yuriy Protasov | Ford Fiesta RRC | WRC-2 | 4:23:27.0 | +5:27.1 | 15 |
| 4 (14.) | 36 | (Estonia) Karl Kruuda | (Estonia) Martin Järveoja | (Estonia) Karl Kruuda | Peugeot 208 T16 R5 | WRC-2 | 4:26:35.5 | +8:35.6 | 12 |
| 5 (15.) | 43 | (Portugal) Bernardo Sousa | (Portugal) Hugo Magalhães | (Portugal) Bernardo Sousa | Ford Fiesta RRC | WRC-2 | 4:26:54.7 | +8:54.8 | 10 |
| 6 (17.) | 38 | (France) Quentin Gilbert | (Belgium) Renaud Jamoul | (United Kingdom) Drive Dmack | Ford Fiesta R5 | WRC-2 | 4:32:08.2 | +14:08.3 | 8 |
| 7 (20.) | 48 | (Estonia) Martin Kangur | (Poland) Paweł Drahan | (Ukraine) AT Rally Team | Ford Fiesta S2000 | WRC-2 | 4:36:21.8 | +18:21.9 | 6 |
| 8 (21.) | 35 | (Estonia) Ott Tänak | (Estonia) Raigo Mőlder | (United Kingdom) Drive DMACK | Ford Fiesta R5 | WRC-2 | 4:46:07.0 | +28:07.1 | 4 |
| 9 (23.) | 72 | (Argentina) Juan Carlos Alonso | (Argentina) Juan Pablo Monasterolo | (Argentina) Juan Carlos Alonso | Mitsubishi Lancer Evo X | WRC-2 | 4:47:57.8 | +29:57.9 | 2 |
| 10 (24.) | 78 | (Chile) Ramón Torres | (Argentina) José Díaz | (Chile) Ramón Torres | Mitsubishi Lancer Evo X | WRC-2 | 4:51:11.1 | +33:11.2 | 1 |

=== Special stages ===
| Day | Stage | Name | Length | Winner | Car | Time | Rally leader |
|---|---|---|---|---|---|---|---|
| Leg 1 (5 June) | SS1 | Città di Cagliari | 1.30 km | (Finland) Mikko Hirvonen | Ford Fiesta RS WRC | 1:19.1 | (Finland) Mikko Hirvonen |
| Leg 1 (6 June) | SS2 | Terranova Nord 1 | 19.81 km | (Belgium) Thierry Neuville | Hyundai i20 WRC | 13:28.1 | (Belgium) Thierry Neuville |
| Leg 1 (6 June) | SS3 | Terranova Sud 1 | 12.40 km | (Finland) Juho Hänninen | Hyundai i20 WRC | 9:25.2 | (Finland) Juho Hänninen |
| Leg 1 (6 June) | SS4 | Coiluna - Crastazza 1 | 20.29 km | (Norway) Mads Østberg | Citroën DS3 WRC | 13:22.9 | (Belgium) Thierry Neuville |
| Leg 1 (6 June) | SS5 | Loelle 1 | 27.30 km | (Finland) Jari-Matti Latvala | Volkswagen Polo R WRC | 18:23.6 | (Finland) Jari-Matti Latvala |
| Leg 1 (6 June) | SS6 | Terranova Nord 2 | 19.81 km | (Finland) Jari-Matti Latvala | Volkswagen Polo R WRC | 13:01.7 | (Finland) Jari-Matti Latvala |
| Leg 1 (6 June) | SS7 | Terranova Sud 2 | 12.40 km | (Finland) Jari-Matti Latvala | Volkswagen Polo R WRC | 9:06.1 | (Finland) Jari-Matti Latvala |
| Leg 1 (6 June) | SS8 | Coiluna - Crastazza 2 | 20.29 km | (France) Sébastien Ogier | Volkswagen Polo R WRC | 12:51.9 | (Finland) Jari-Matti Latvala |
| Leg 1 (6 June) | SS9 | Loelle 2 | 27.30 km | (Finland) Jari-Matti Latvala | Volkswagen Polo R WRC | 17:43.8 | (Finland) Jari-Matti Latvala |
| Leg 2 (7 June) | SS10 | Monte Olia 1 | 19.27 km | (Finland) Jari-Matti Latvala | Volkswagen Polo R WRC | 13:31.6 | (Finland) Jari-Matti Latvala |
| Leg 2 (7 June) | SS11 | Monte Lerno 1 | 59.13 km | (France) Sébastien Ogier | Volkswagen Polo R WRC | 37:15.8 | (Finland) Jari-Matti Latvala |
| Leg 2 (7 June) | SS12 | Monte Olia 2 | 19.27 km | (France) Sébastien Ogier | Volkswagen Polo R WRC | 13:12.2 | (Finland) Jari-Matti Latvala |
| Leg 2 (7 June) | SS13 | Monte Lerno 2 | 59.13 km | (France) Sébastien Ogier | Volkswagen Polo R WRC | 36:38.0 | (France) Sébastien Ogier |
| Leg 3 (8 June) | SS14 | Cala Flumini 1 | 8.98 km | (Norway) Mads Østberg | Citroën DS3 WRC | 5:50.9 | (France) Sébastien Ogier |
| Leg 3 (8 June) | SS15 | Castelsardo 1 | 14.00 km | (Finland) Jari-Matti Latvala | Volkswagen Polo R WRC | 10:29.7 | (France) Sébastien Ogier |
| Leg 3 (8 June) | SS16 | Tergu - Osilo | 14.88 km | (Finland) Jari-Matti Latvala | Volkswagen Polo R WRC | 9:48.8 | (France) Sébastien Ogier |
| Leg 3 (8 June) | SS14 | Cala Flumini 2 (Power Stage) | 8.98 km | (Norway) Andreas Mikkelsen | Volkswagen Polo R WRC | 5:39.7 | (France) Sébastien Ogier |

=== Power Stage ===
The "Power stage" was a 8.98 km (5.58 mi) stage at the end of the rally.

| Pos | Driver | Car | Time | Diff. | Pts |
|---|---|---|---|---|---|
| 1 | (Norway) Andreas Mikkelsen | Volkswagen Polo R WRC | 5:39.7 | 0.0 | 3 |
| 2 | (Finland) Jari-Matti Latvala | Volkswagen Polo R WRC | 5:40.7 | +1.0 | 2 |
| 3 | (France) Sébastien Ogier | Volkswagen Polo R WRC | 5:42.2 | +2.5 | 1 |

== Standings after the rally ==
=== WRC ===
Drivers' Championship standings

| Pos. | Driver | Points |
|---|---|---|
| 1 | (France) Sebastien Ogier | 138 |
| 2 | (Finland) Jari-Matti Latvala | 105 |
| 3 | (Norway) Mads Østberg | 66 |
| 4 | (Norway) Andreas Mikkelsen | 63 |
| 5 | (Finland) Mikko Hirvonen | 40 |

Manufacturers' Championship standings

| Pos. | Manufacturer | Points |
|---|---|---|
| 1 | (Germany) Volkswagen Motorsport | 227 |
| 2 | (France) Citroën Total Abu Dhabi WRT | 109 |
| 3 | (United Kingdom) M-Sport World Rally Team | 78 |
| 4 | (Germany) Volkswagen Motorsport II | 64 |
| 5 | (Germany) Hyundai Motorsport | 57 |

=== Other ===
WRC2 Drivers' Championship standings

| Pos. | Driver | Points |
|---|---|---|
| 1 | (Italy) Lorenzo Bertelli | 81 |
| 2 | (Ukraine) Yuriy Protasov | 75 |
| 3 | (Qatar) Nasser Al-Attiyah | 50 |
| 4 | (Estonia) Karl Kruuda | 49 |
| 5 | (Finland) Jari Ketomaa | 36 |

WRC3 Drivers' Championship standings

| Pos. | Driver | Points |
|---|---|---|
| 1 | (France) Quentin Gilbert | 25 |
| 2 | (France) Stéphane Lefebvre | 25 |
| 3 | (Germany) Christian Riedemann | 18 |
| 4 | (Slovakia) Martin Koči | 15 |
| 5 | (Switzerland) Federico della Casa | 12 |

Junior WRC Drivers' Championship standings

| Pos. | Driver | Points |
|---|---|---|
| 1 | (France) Stéphane Lefebvre | 25 |
| 2 | (Germany) Christian Riedemann | 18 |
| 3 | (Slovakia) Martin Koči | 15 |
| 4 | (Switzerland) Federico della Casa | 12 |
| 5 | (Italy) Simone Campedelli | 10 |
