= Jipocar Czech National Team =

World Rally Championship manufacturing team

- Full name: Jipocar Czech National Team
- Team principal(s): (Czech Republic) Quirin Müller
- Drivers: (Czech Republic) Martin Prokop (Slovakia) Jaroslav Melichárek
- Co-drivers: (Czech Republic) Michal Ernst (Slovakia) Erik Melichrek
- Chassis: Ford Fiesta RS WRC
- Tyres: Pirelli

World Rally Championship history
- Debut: 2013 (as WRC team)
- Manufacturers' Championships: 0
- Drivers' Championships: 0
- Rally wins: 0

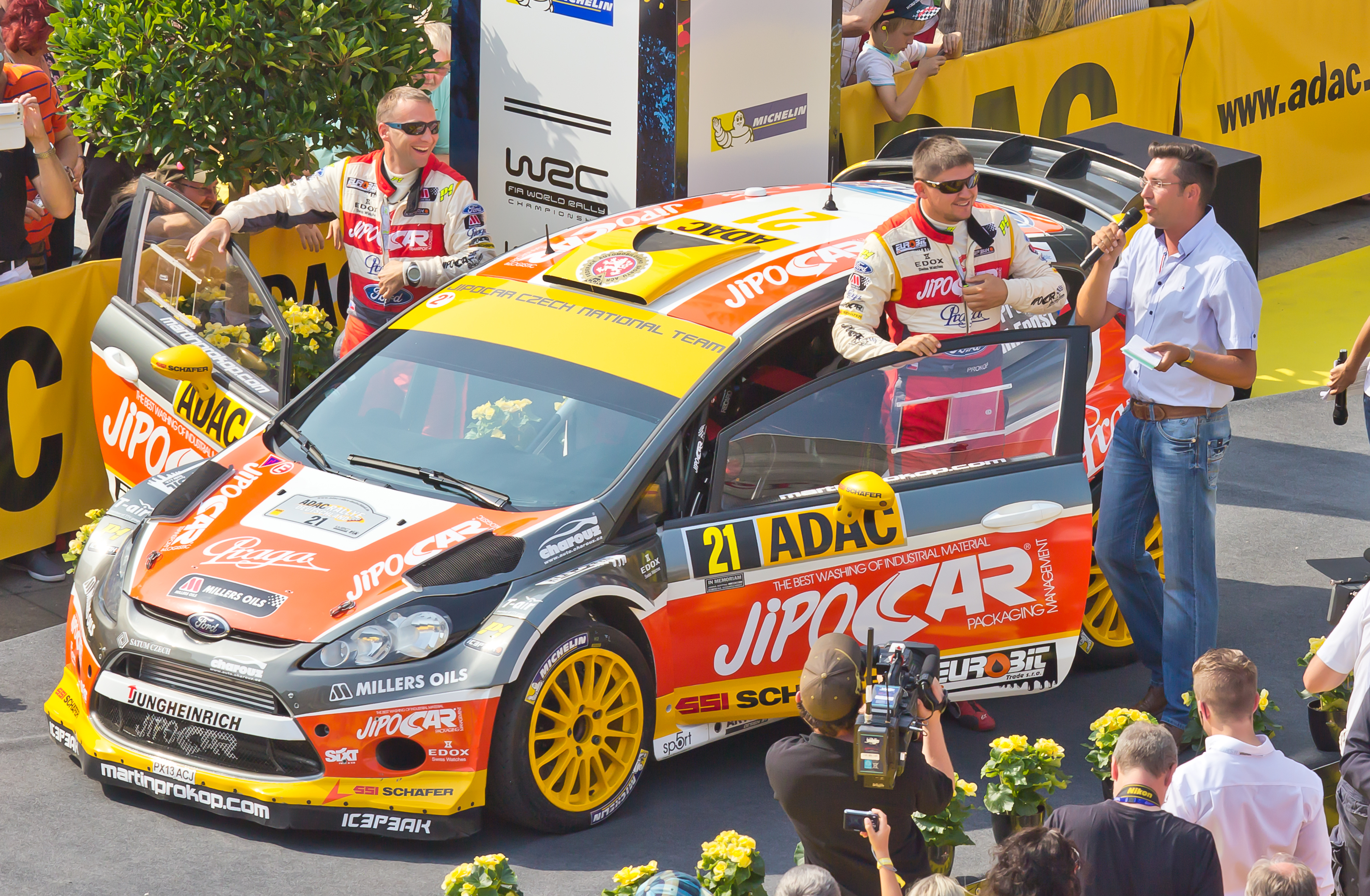
2013 Rallye Deutschland, Cologne, Germany

Jipocar Czech National Team is a Czech motor racing team, which runs the WRC campaign of Martin Prokop. The team debuted in 2010 and will appear as fully eligible to score WRC manufacturer points team from 2013 Rally Sweden.

The origins of the team can be traced back to the years when Prokop was racing in the support WRC series – Junior World Rally Championship (JWRC) and Production World Rally Championship (PWRC). The team appeared as Czech Ford National Team in 2010. The team and Prokop raced in SWRC with Ford Fiesta S2000. For 2011 the team switched to Ford Fiesta RS WRC, but they were not eligible for scoring manufacturer points as they were not registered as manufacturer or WRC team. The trend was kept in 2012. From 2013 Rally Sweden the team will be eligible to score manufacturer points.

In 2014, the team expanded to run a second car at selected events. This car, entered under the name Slovakia World Rally Team would not be eligible to score manufacturer points.

== Complete WRC results ==
Year	Team	Car	Driver Co-driver	Rounds														WDC	Points	WMC	Points
Year	Team	Car	Driver Co-driver	1	2	3	4	5	6	7	8	9	10	11	12	13	14	WDC	Points	WMC	Points
2012	Czech Ford National Team	Ford Fiesta RS WRC	(Czech Republic) Martin Prokop (Czech Republic) Zdeněk Hrůza^{1}	MON; 9	SWE; 9	MEX	POR; 5	ARG	GRE; 5	NZL	FIN; 9	GER; Ret	GBR; 9	FRA; 9	ITA; 8	ESP; 13		9th	46	–	–^{2}
2013	Jipocar Czech National Team	Ford Fiesta RS WRC	(Czech Republic) Martin Prokop (Czech Republic) Michal Ernst	MON; 7	SWE; 7	MEX; 9	POR; 7	ARG; 10	GRE; 7	ITA; 5	FIN; Ret	GER; 4	AUS	FRA; Ret	ESP; 7	GBR; 6		9th	63	5th	65^{3}
2014	Jipocar Czech National Team	Ford Fiesta RS WRC	(Czech Republic) Martin Prokop (Czech Republic) Jan Tománek^{4}	MON; Ret	SWE; Ret	MEX; 5	POR; 6	ARG; 8	ITA; 6	POL; 10	FIN; Ret	GER; 7	AUS	FRA; 10	ESP; 8	GBR; 9		9th	44	6th	49
2014	Slovakia World Rally Team	Ford Fiesta RS WRC	(Slovakia) Jaroslav Melichárek (Slovakia) Erik Melichárek	MON; 8	SWE	MEX	POR	ARG	ITA; 19	POL	FIN	GER; 14	AUS	FRA	ESP	GBR		21st	4	–	–^{2}
2015	Jipocar Czech National Team	Ford Fiesta RS WRC	(Czech Republic) Martin Prokop (Czech Republic) Jan Tománek	MON; 9	SWE; 8	MEX; 6	ARG; 4	POR; 10	ITA; Ret	POL; 11	FIN; 7	GER; Ret	AUS	FRA; 12	ESP; 7	GBR; 21		11th	39	7th	53
2015	Jaroslav Melichárek	Ford Fiesta RS WRC	(Slovakia) Jaroslav Melichárek (Slovakia) Erik Melichárek	MON	SWE	MEX	ARG	POR	ITA	POL	FIN	GER; Ret	AUS	FRA	ESP	GBR		–	0	–	–^{2}
2016	Jipocar Czech National Team	Ford Fiesta RS WRC	(Czech Republic) Martin Prokop (Czech Republic) Jan Tománek	MON	SWE	MEX; 7	ARG	POR; 8	ITA; 9	POL	FIN	GER	CHN; C	FRA	ESP; Ret	GBR	AUS	15th	12	7th	18
2017	OneBet Jipocar Czech National Team	Ford Fiesta RS WRC	(Czech Republic) Martin Prokop (Czech Republic) Jan Tománek	MON	SWE	MEX	FRA	ARG	POR; 14	ITA; 28	POL	FIN	GER	ESP	GBR	AUS		NC	0	–	–^{2}

Notes:

- ^1 – For the last rally of the season Hrůza was replaced by Michal Ernst.
- ^2 – The team was not competing in Manufacturers Championship.
- ^3 – The team was eligible to compete for Manufacturer points from Rally Sweden.
- ^4 – Jan Tománek replaced Michal Ernst after Rally Monte Carlo.
