= 2016 Rally de Portugal =

Motor rally competition

2016 Rally de Portugal: 50. Vodafone Rally de Portugal 2016
Round 5 of the 2016 World Rally Championship
| ← Previous event | Next event → |
- Rally base: (Portugal) Matosinhos
- Dates run: 19 – 22 May 2016
- Stages: 19 (368.00 km; 228.66 miles)
- Stage surface: Gravel

Overall results
- Overall winner: (United Kingdom) Kris Meeke (Republic of Ireland) Paul Nagle (France) Abu Dhabi Total World Rally Team

The 2016 Rally de Portugal (formally the 50. Vodafone Rally de Portugal 2016) was the fifth round of the 2016 World Rally Championship. The race was held over four days between 19 May and 22 May 2016, and was based in Matosinhos, Portugal. Citroën's Kris Meeke won the race, his 2nd win in the World Rally Championship.

== Overall standings ==
| Pos. | No. | Driver | Co-driver | Team | Car | Class | Time | Difference | Points |
Overall classification
| 1 | 7 | (United Kingdom) Kris Meeke | (Republic of Ireland) Paul Nagle | (France) Abu Dhabi Total World Rally Team | Citroën DS3 WRC | WRC | 3:59:01.0 | | 25 |
| 2 | 9 | (Norway) Andreas Mikkelsen | (Norway) Anders Jæger | (Germany) Volkswagen Motorsport II | Volkswagen Polo R WRC | WRC | 3:59:30.7 | +29.7 | 19 |
| 3 | 1 | (France) Sébastien Ogier | (France) Julien Ingrassia | (Germany) Volkswagen Motorsport | Volkswagen Polo R WRC | WRC | 3:59:35.5 | +34.5 | 18 |
| 4 | 4 | (Spain) Dani Sordo | (Spain) Marc Martí | (Germany) Hyundai Motorsport | Hyundai i20 WRC | WRC | 4:00:38.1 | +1:37.1 | 12 |
| 5 | 6 | (France) Eric Camilli | (France) Benjamin Veillas | (United Kingdom) M-Sport World Rally Team | Ford Fiesta RS WRC | WRC | 4:03:02.6 | +4:01.6 | 10 |
| 6 | 2 | (Finland) Jari-Matti Latvala | (Finland) Miikka Anttila | (Germany) Volkswagen Motorsport | Volkswagen Polo R WRC | WRC | 4:03:07.9 | +4:06.9 | 10 |
| 7 | 5 | (Norway) Mads Østberg | (Norway) Ola Fløene | (United Kingdom) M-Sport World Rally Team | Ford Fiesta RS WRC | WRC | 4:05:54.6 | +6:53.6 | 6 |
| 8 | 21 | (Czech Republic) Martin Prokop | (Czech Republic) Jan Tománek | (Czech Republic) Jipocar Czech National Team | Ford Fiesta RS WRC | WRC | 4:09:25.1 | +10:24.1 | 4 |
| 9 | 34 | (Sweden) Pontus Tidemand | (Sweden) Jonas Andersson | (Czech Republic) Škoda Motorsport | Škoda Fabia R5 | WRC-2 | 4:10:46.2 | +11:45.2 | 2 |
| 10 | 42 | (Peru) Nicolás Fuchs | (Argentina) Fernando Mussano | (Peru) Nicolás Fuchs | Škoda Fabia R5 | WRC-2 | 4:12:15.0 | +13:14.0 | 1 |

== Special stages ==
| Day | Stage | Name | Length | Winner | Car | Time | Rally leader |
|---|---|---|---|---|---|---|---|
| Leg 1 | SS1 | SSS Lousada | 3.36 km | (France) Sébastien Ogier | Volkswagen Polo R WRC | 2:41.1 | (France) Sébastien Ogier |
| Leg 1 | SS2 | Ponte de Lima 1 | 27.44 km | (United Kingdom) Kris Meeke | Citroën DS3 WRC | 19:17.8 | (United Kingdom) Kris Meeke |
| Leg 1 | SS3 | Caminha 1 | 18.03 km | (United Kingdom) Kris Meeke | Citroën DS3 WRC | 10:35.3 | (United Kingdom) Kris Meeke |
| Leg 1 | SS4 | Viana do Castelo 1 | 18.70 km | (Finland) Jari-Matti Latvala | Volkswagen Polo R WRC | 11:27.1 | (United Kingdom) Kris Meeke |
| Leg 1 | SS5 | Ponte de Lima 2 | 27.44 km | (United Kingdom) Kris Meeke | Citroën DS3 WRC | 19:20.6 | (United Kingdom) Kris Meeke |
| Leg 1 | SS6 | Caminha 2 | 18.03 km | (United Kingdom) Kris Meeke | Citroën DS3 WRC | 10:31.7 | (United Kingdom) Kris Meeke |
| Leg 1 | SS7 | Viana do Castelo 2 | 18.70 km | (United Kingdom) Kris Meeke | Citroën DS3 WRC | 11:22.3 | (United Kingdom) Kris Meeke |
| Leg 1 | SS8 | Porto Street Stage 1 | 1.85 km | (Belgium) Thierry Neuville | Hyundai i20 WRC | 1:46.9 | (United Kingdom) Kris Meeke |
| Leg 1 | SS9 | Porto Street Stage 2 | 1.85 km | (Belgium) Thierry Neuville | Hyundai i20 WRC | 1:43.6 | (United Kingdom) Kris Meeke |
| Leg 2 | SS10 | Baião 1 | 18.66 km | (United Kingdom) Kris Meeke | Citroën DS3 WRC | 11:35.4 | (United Kingdom) Kris Meeke |
| Leg 2 | SS11 | Marão 1 | 26.31 km | (United Kingdom) Kris Meeke | Citroën DS3 WRC | 16:46.8 | (United Kingdom) Kris Meeke |
| Leg 2 | SS12 | Amarante 1 | 37.67 km | (United Kingdom) Kris Meeke | Citroën DS3 WRC | 25:10.9 | (United Kingdom) Kris Meeke |
| Leg 2 | SS13 | Baião 2 | 18.66 km | (Norway) Andreas Mikkelsen | Volkswagen Polo R WRC | 11:30.2 | (United Kingdom) Kris Meeke |
| Leg 2 | SS14 | Marão 2 | 26.31 km | (Norway) Andreas Mikkelsen | Volkswagen Polo R WRC | 16:39.9 | (United Kingdom) Kris Meeke |
| Leg 2 | SS15 | Amarante 2 | 37.67 km | (France) Sébastien Ogier | Volkswagen Polo R WRC | 25:05.0 | (United Kingdom) Kris Meeke |
| Leg 3 | SS16 | Vieira do Minho 1 | 22.47 km | (Norway) Andreas Mikkelsen | Volkswagen Polo R WRC | 14:29.6 | (United Kingdom) Kris Meeke |
| Leg 3 | SS17 | Fafe 1 | 11.19 km | (Norway) Andreas Mikkelsen | Volkswagen Polo R WRC | 6:49.2 | (United Kingdom) Kris Meeke |
| Leg 3 | SS18 | Vieira do Minho 2 | 22.47 km | (France) Sébastien Ogier | Volkswagen Polo R WRC | 14:24.5 | (United Kingdom) Kris Meeke |
| Leg 3 | SS19 | Fafe 2 (Power Stage) | 11.19 km | (France) Sébastien Ogier | Volkswagen Polo R WRC | 6:44.3 | (United Kingdom) Kris Meeke |

=== Power Stage ===
The "Power stage" was a 11.19 km (6.95 mi) stage at the end of the rally.

| Pos | Driver | Car | Time | Diff. | Pts |
|---|---|---|---|---|---|
| 1 | (France) Sébastien Ogier | Volkswagen Polo R WRC | 6:44.3 | 0.0 | 3 |
| 2 | (Finland) Jari-Matti Latvala | Volkswagen Polo R WRC | 6:45.5 | +1.2 | 2 |
| 3 | (Norway) Andreas Mikkelsen | Volkswagen Polo R WRC | 6:46.3 | +2.0 | 1 |
