= 2014 Rally Sweden =

Motor racing event

2014 Rally Sweden: 62. Rally Sweden 2014
Round 2 of 13 of the 2014 World Rally Championship
← Previous event	Next event →
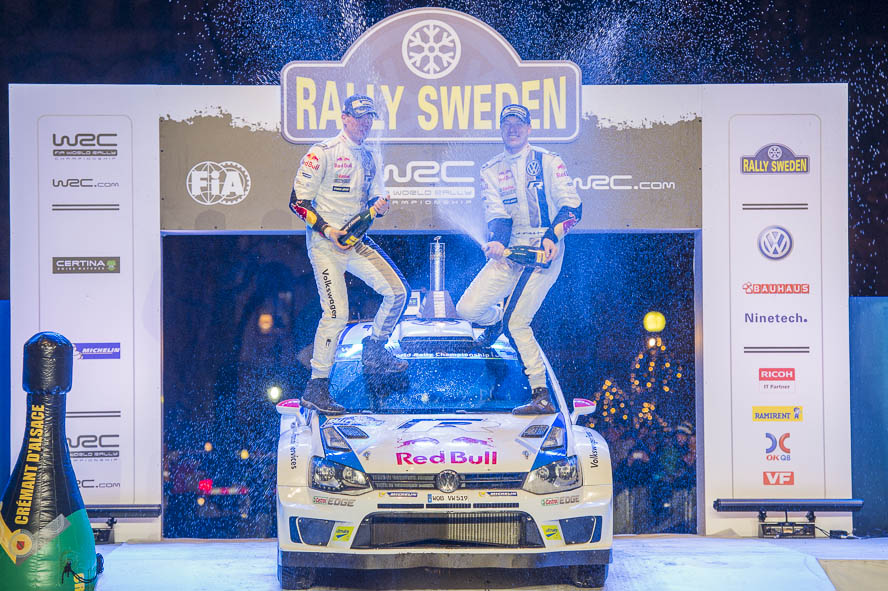
- Jari-Matti Latvala during Podium
- Host country: Sweden
- Rally base: (Sweden) Karlstad
- Dates run: 5 – 8 February 2014
- Stages: 24 (323.54 km; 201.04 miles)
- Stage surface: Snow and ice

Statistics
- Crews: 39 at start, 30 at finish

Overall results
- Overall winner: (Finland) Jari-Matti Latvala (Germany) Volkswagen Motorsport

The 2014 Rally Sweden was a motor racing event for rally cars that was held over four days between 5 and 8 February, which marked the 62nd running of the Rally Sweden. The rally was based in the town of Karlstad and was contested over 24 special stages, covering a total of 323.54 km (201.04 mi) in competitive stages.

The event was won by Finland's Jari-Matti Latvala of the Volkswagen Motorsport team, taking his third victory in Sweden, and the ninth victory of his WRC career. He finished 53.6 seconds clear of his teammate Andreas Mikkelsen – taking his best WRC finish – while the podium was completed by Mads Østberg, a further 5.9 seconds in arrears. Latvala's victory allowed him to take the championship lead from another teammate, Sébastien Ogier, who could only finish sixth in Sweden. In the supporting WRC-2 category, Karl Kruuda edged out Jari Ketomaa by 2.3 seconds for the victory.

== Entry list ==
Notable entrants
No.	Entrant	Class	Driver	Co-driver	Car	Tyre
1	(Germany) Volkswagen Motorsport	WRC	(France) Sébastien Ogier	(France) Julien Ingrassia	Volkswagen Polo R WRC	MI
2	(Germany) Volkswagen Motorsport	WRC	(Finland) Jari-Matti Latvala	(Finland) Miikka Anttila	Volkswagen Polo R WRC	MI
3	(France) Citroën Total Abu Dhabi WRT	WRC	(United Kingdom) Kris Meeke	(Republic of Ireland) Paul Nagle	Citroën DS3 WRC	MI
4	(France) Citroën Total Abu Dhabi WRT	WRC	(Norway) Mads Østberg	(Sweden) Jonas Andersson	Citroën DS3 WRC	MI
5	(United Kingdom) M-Sport World Rally Team	WRC	(Finland) Mikko Hirvonen	(Finland) Jarmo Lehtinen	Ford Fiesta RS WRC	MI
6	(United Kingdom) M-Sport World Rally Team	WRC	(United Kingdom) Elfyn Evans	(United Kingdom) Daniel Barritt	Ford Fiesta RS WRC	MI
7	(Germany) Hyundai Motorsport	WRC	(Belgium) Thierry Neuville	(Belgium) Nicolas Gilsoul	Hyundai i20 WRC	MI
8	(Germany) Hyundai Motorsport	WRC	(Finland) Juho Hänninen	(Finland) Tomi Tuominen	Hyundai i20 WRC	MI
9	(Germany) Volkswagen Motorsport II	WRC	(Norway) Andreas Mikkelsen	(Finland) Mikko Markkula	Volkswagen Polo R WRC	MI
10	(United Kingdom) RK M-Sport World Rally Team	WRC	(Poland) Robert Kubica	(Poland) Maciej Szczepaniak	Ford Fiesta RS WRC	MI
11	(United Kingdom) M-Sport World Rally Team	WRC	(Estonia) Ott Tänak	(Estonia) Raigo Mõlder	Ford Fiesta RS WRC	MI
12	(France) Citroën Total Abu Dhabi WRT	WRC	(United Arab Emirates) Khalid Al-Qassimi	(United Kingdom) Chris Patterson	Citroën DS3 WRC	MI
14	(United Kingdom) M-Sport World Rally Team	WRC	(Poland) Michał Sołowow	(Poland) Maciej Baran	Ford Fiesta RS WRC	MI
15	(Sweden) Pontus Tidemand	WRC	(Sweden) Pontus Tidemand	(Norway) Ola Floene	Ford Fiesta RS WRC	MI
16	(Norway) Henning Solberg	WRC	(Norway) Henning Solberg	(Austria) Ilka Minor	Ford Fiesta RS WRC	P
17	(Republic of Ireland) Craig Breen	WRC	(Republic of Ireland) Craig Breen	(United Kingdom) Scott Martin	Ford Fiesta RS WRC	MI
21	(Czech Republic) Jipocar Czech National Team	WRC	(Czech Republic) Martin Prokop	(Czech Republic) Jan Tománek	Ford Fiesta RS WRC	MI
31	(Saudi Arabia) Yazeed Racing	WRC-2	(Saudi Arabia) Yazeed Al-Rajhi	(United Kingdom) Michael Orr	Ford Fiesta RRC	MI
32	(Ukraine) Yuriy Protasov	WRC-2	(Ukraine) Yuriy Protasov	(Ukraine) Pavlo Cherepin	Ford Fiesta R5	MI
33	(United Kingdom) Drive DMACK	WRC-2	(Finland) Jari Ketomaa	(Finland) Kaj Lindström	Ford Fiesta R5	DM
34	(Norway) Anders Grøndal	WRC-2	(Norway) Anders Grøndal	(Norway) Roger Eilertsen	Subaru Impreza WRX STi	P
37	(Italy) FWRT s.r.l.	WRC-2	(Italy) Lorenzo Bertelli	(Italy) Mitia Dotta	Ford Fiesta R5	P
40	(Ukraine) Eurolamp World Rally Team	WRC-2	(Ukraine) Valeriy Gorban	(Ukraine) Volodymyr Korsia	MINI John Cooper Works S2000	P
41	(Estonia) Karl Kruuda	WRC-2	(Estonia) Karl Kruuda	(Estonia) Martin Järveoja	Ford Fiesta S2000	MI
42	(Sweden) Fredrik Åhlin	WRC-2	(Sweden) Fredrik Åhlin	(Norway) Moreten Erik Abrahamsen	Ford Fiesta R5	DM
43	(Greece) Jourdan Serderidis	WRC-2	(Greece) Jourdan Serderidis	(Belgium) Morgane Rose	Ford Fiesta R5	P
45	(Italy) Gianluca Linari	WRC-2	(Italy) Gianluca Linari	(Italy) Nicola Arena	Subaru Impreza WRX STi	P
72	(Finland) Kristian Sohlberg		(Finland) Kristian Sohlberg	(Finland) Peter Flythström	Ford Fiesta R5	DM
73	(Germany) Maximilian Koch		(Germany) Maximilian Koch	(Germany) Stefan Weigel	Subaru Impreza WRX STi	MI
74	(Sweden) Robert Blomberg		(Sweden) Robert Blomberg	(Sweden) Kristoffer Karlsson	Subaru Impreza WRX STi	P
75	(Sweden) Joakim Roman		(Sweden) Joakim Roman	(Sweden) Marcus Sundh	Subaru Impreza WRX STi	DM
76	(Sweden) Mattias Adielsson		(Sweden) Mattias Adielsson	(Sweden) Patrik Barth	Peugeot 208 R2	MI
77	(Italy) Fabio Frisiero		(Italy) Fabio Frisiero	(Italy) Simone Scattolin	Peugeot 207 S2000	P
78	(Republic of Ireland) Eamonn Boland		(Republic of Ireland) Eamonn Boland	(Republic of Ireland) Michael Joseph Morrissey	Subaru Impreza STi R4	MI
79	(Spain) Joan Font Guixaro		(Spain) Joan Font Guixaro	(Spain) Alex Haro	Mitsubishi Lancer Evo IX	P
81	(Poland) Hubert Ptaszek		(Poland) Hubert Ptaszek	(Poland) Kamil Kozdron	Ford Fiesta R2	MI
82	(Slovakia) Martin Koči		(Slovakia) Martin Koči	(Czech Republic) Lukáš Kostka	Citroën DS3 R3T	MI
83	(Poland) Szymon Gospodarczyk		(Poland) Łukasz Kabacinski	(Poland) Szymon Gospodarczyk	Renault Clio R3	MI
84	(Ukraine) Borys Gandzha		(Ukraine) Borys Gandzha	(Ukraine) Sergiy Potiyko	Mitsubishi Lancer Evo IX	P

Icon	Class
WRC	WRC entries eligible to score manufacturer points
WRC	Major entry ineligible to score manufacturer points
WRC-2	Registered to take part in WRC-2 championship
WRC-3	Registered to take part in WRC-3 championship

== Results ==
=== Event standings ===
Pos.	No.	Driver	Co-driver	Team	Car	Class	Time	Difference	Points
Overall classification
1	2	(Finland) Jari-Matti Latvala	(Finland) Miikka Anttila	(Germany) Volkswagen Motorsport	Volkswagen Polo R WRC	WRC	3:00:31.1	0.00	27
2	9	(Norway) Andreas Mikkelsen	(Finland) Mikko Markkula	(Germany) Volkswagen Motorsport II	Volkswagen Polo R WRC	WRC	3:01:24.7	+53.6	18
3	4	(Norway) Mads Østberg	(Sweden) Jonas Andersson	(France) Citroën Total Abu Dhabi WRT	Citroën DS3 WRC	WRC	3:01:30.6	+59.5	18
4	5	(Finland) Mikko Hirvonen	(Finland) Jarmo Lehtinen	(United Kingdom) M-Sport WRT	Ford Fiesta RS WRC	WRC	3:02:58.0	+2:26.9	13
5	11	(Estonia) Ott Tänak	(Estonia) Raigo Mõlder	(United Kingdom) M-Sport WRT	Ford Fiesta RS WRC	WRC	3:03:31.6	+3:00.5	10
6	1	(France) Sébastien Ogier	(France) Julien Ingrassia	(Germany) Volkswagen Motorsport	Volkswagen Polo R WRC	WRC	3:05:01.0	+4:29.9	8
7	16	(Norway) Henning Solberg	(Austria) Ilka Minor	(Norway) Henning Solberg	Ford Fiesta RS WRC	WRC	3:05:18.6	+4:47.5	6
8	15	(Sweden) Pontus Tidemand	(Norway) Ola Fløene	(Sweden) Pontus Tidemand	Ford Fiesta RS WRC	WRC	3:06:09.3	+5:38.2	4
9	17	(Republic of Ireland) Craig Breen	(United Kingdom) Scott Martin	(Republic of Ireland) Craig Breen	Ford Fiesta RS WRC	WRC	3:09:26.5	+8:55.4	2
10	3	(United Kingdom) Kris Meeke	(Republic of Ireland) Paul Nagle	(France) Citroën Total Abu Dhabi WRT	Citroën DS3 WRC	WRC	3:11:49.1	+11:18.0	1
WRC-2 standings
1 (11.)	41	(Estonia) Karl Kruuda	(Estonia) Raigo Mõlder	(Estonia) Karl Kruuda	Ford Fiesta S2000	WRC-2	3:14:40.2	+14:09.1	25
2 (12.)	33	(Finland) Jari Ketomaa	(Finland) Kaj Lindström	(United Kingdom) Drive DMACK	Ford Fiesta R5	WRC-2	3:14:42.5	+14:11.4	18
3 (13.)	42	(Sweden) Fredrik Åhlin	(Norway) Morten Erik Abrahamsen	(Sweden) Fredrik Åhlin	Ford Fiesta R5	WRC-2	3:15:58.3	+15:27.2	15
4 (14.)	31	(Saudi Arabia) Yazeed Al-Rajhi	(United Kingdom) Michael Orr	(Saudi Arabia) Yazeed Al-Rajhi	Ford Fiesta R5	WRC-2	3:16:57.6	+16:26.5	12
5 (15.)	32	(Ukraine) Yuriy Protasov	(Ukraine) Pavlo Cherepin	(Ukraine) Yuriy Protasov	Ford Fiesta R5	WRC-2	3:18:00.3	+17:29.2	10
6 (18.)	37	(Italy) Lorenzo Bertelli	(Italy) Mitia Dotta	(Italy) FWRT s.r.l.	Ford Fiesta R5	WRC-2	3:25:14.4	+24:43.3	8
7 (15.)	40	(Ukraine) Valeriy Gorban	(Ukraine) Volodymyr Korsia	(Ukraine) Eurolamp World Rally Team	MINI John Cooper Works S2000	WRC-2	3:28:49.2	+28:18.1	6
8 (26.)	45	(Italy) Gianluca Linari	(Italy) Nicola Arena	(Italy) Gianluca Linari	Subaru Impreza WRX STi	WRC-2	3:40:43.1	+40:12.0	4

== Championship standings after the race ==
=== WRC ===
Drivers' Championship standings

Pos.	Driver	Points
1	(Finland) Jari-Matti Latvala	40
2	(France) Sebastien Ogier	35
3	(Norway) Mads Østberg	30
4	(Norway) Andreas Mikkelsen	24
5	(France) Bryan Bouffier	18

Manufacturers' Championship standings

Pos.	Constructor	Points
1	(Germany) Volkswagen Motorsport	72
2	(France) Citroen Total Abu Dhabi WRT	56
3	(Germany) Volkswagen Motorsport II	26
4	(United Kingdom) M-Sport World Rally Team	22
5	(Germany) Hyundai Shell World Rally Team	8

=== Other ===
WRC2 Drivers' Championship standings

Pos.	Driver	Points
1	(Ukraine) Yuriy Protasov	35
2	(Italy) Lorenzo Bertelli	26
3	(Estonia) Karl Kruuda	25
4	(Finland) Jari Ketomaa	18
5	(Republic of Ireland) Robert Barrable	15
5	(Sweden) Fredrik Åhlin	15

WRC3 Drivers' Championship standings

Pos.	Driver	Points
1	(France) Quentin Gilbert	25
