= Khalid Al Qassimi =

Emirati royal and rally driver (born 1972)

Sheikh Khalid Al Qassimi
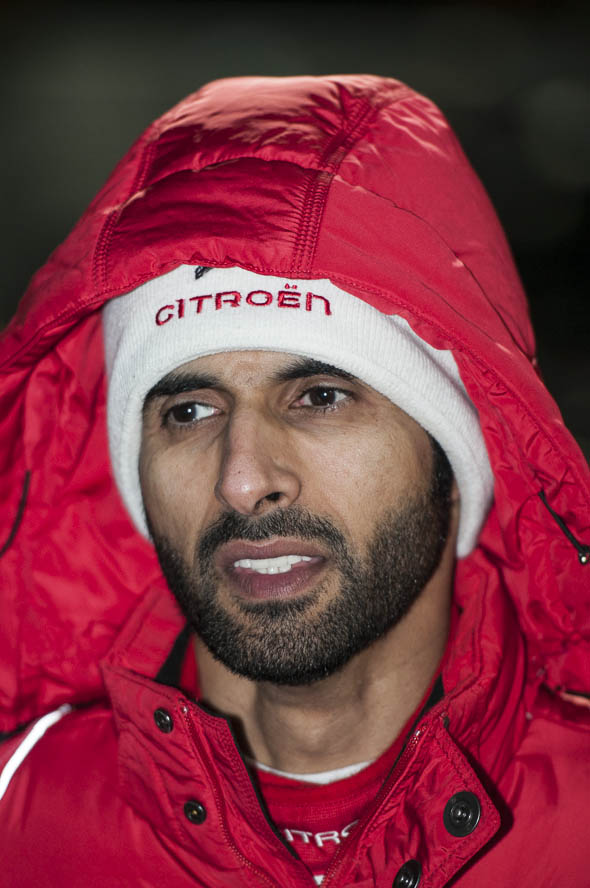
- Sheikh Khalid in 2013

Personal information
- Born: 18 February 1972 (age 54); Abu Dhabi, UAE

World Rally Championship record
- Years active: 2004–2011, 2013–2018
- Teams: Citroën, Ford
- Rallies: over 180 Dakar: 6th in 2018; 7th in 2021; 3rd position in the T1 2WD category 2021
- Championships: Top World Rank Driver-Seeding Driver; 3 times Middle East Champion: FIA Middle East Cup for Drivers Of Production Cars Champion 2002; FIA Middle East Rally Championship for Drivers Champion 2004, 2014; First ever Emirati to win Abu Dhabi Desert Challenge in 2017; World Cup Champion in Cross Country 2WD in 2017
- Podiums: 80
- Total points: 48 in WRC and over 200 in other rallies
- First rally: 2004 Acropolis Rally

Khalid Al Qassimi
- House: Al Qasimi

Sheikh Khalid bin Faisal bin Sultan Al Qassimi (Arabic: الشيخ خالد بن فيصل بن سلطان القاسمي; born 18 February 1972) is a rally driver from the United Arab Emirates, and a member of the royal house of Al Qasimi who rule the Emirates of Sharjah and Ras Al Khaimah, and has competed in the World Rally Championship and Dakar Rally.

== Early life ==
Al Qassimi was born on 18 February 1972. He is the son of Sheikh Faisal bin Sultan Al Qassimi and Sheikha Moza bint Hilal Al Nahyan.

== Career ==
Al Qassimi won the FIA Middle East Cup for Drivers of Production Cars in 2002 and the FIA Middle East Rally Championship in 2004.

At the half way stage of the 2007 World Rally Championship season, a joint venture between the BP Ford World Rally Team and the Abu Dhabi Tourism Board was announced to bring a third official Focus RS WRC to the team's World Rally Championship campaign. With heavy sponsorship from the latter, Al Qassimi was given a chance to drive alongside Mikko Hirvonen and Jari-Matti Latvala in the extra car. Co-driven by Nicky Beech, Khalid Al Qassimi contested Rally Finland, Rallye Deutschland, Rally Catalunya and Rally Ireland. On his debut in Rally Finland, al-Qassimi drove consistently to finish in 16th place overall.

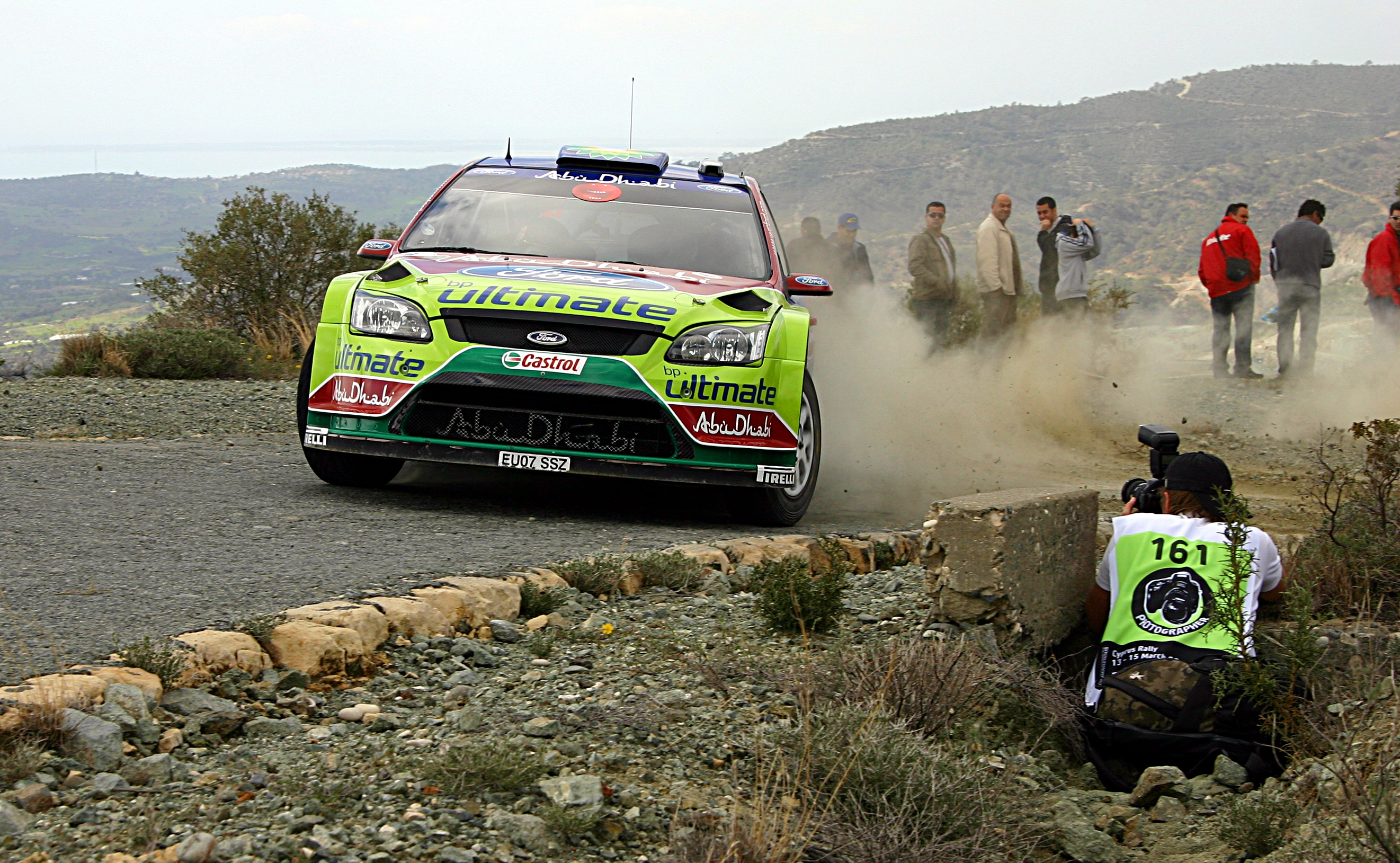
Al Qassimi during the shakedown of the 2009 Cyprus Rally.

For the 2008 WRC season, Al Qassimi continued with BP Ford Abu Dhabi WRT, contesting ten events, co-driven by Michael Orr. His best result was ninth at the Jordan Rally. For 2009, Al Qassimi and co-driver Michael Orr remain with the BP Ford World Rally Team. His season began with a first world championship point by finishing in eighth place on the Rally Ireland; he repeated this feat in Cyprus and Portugal.

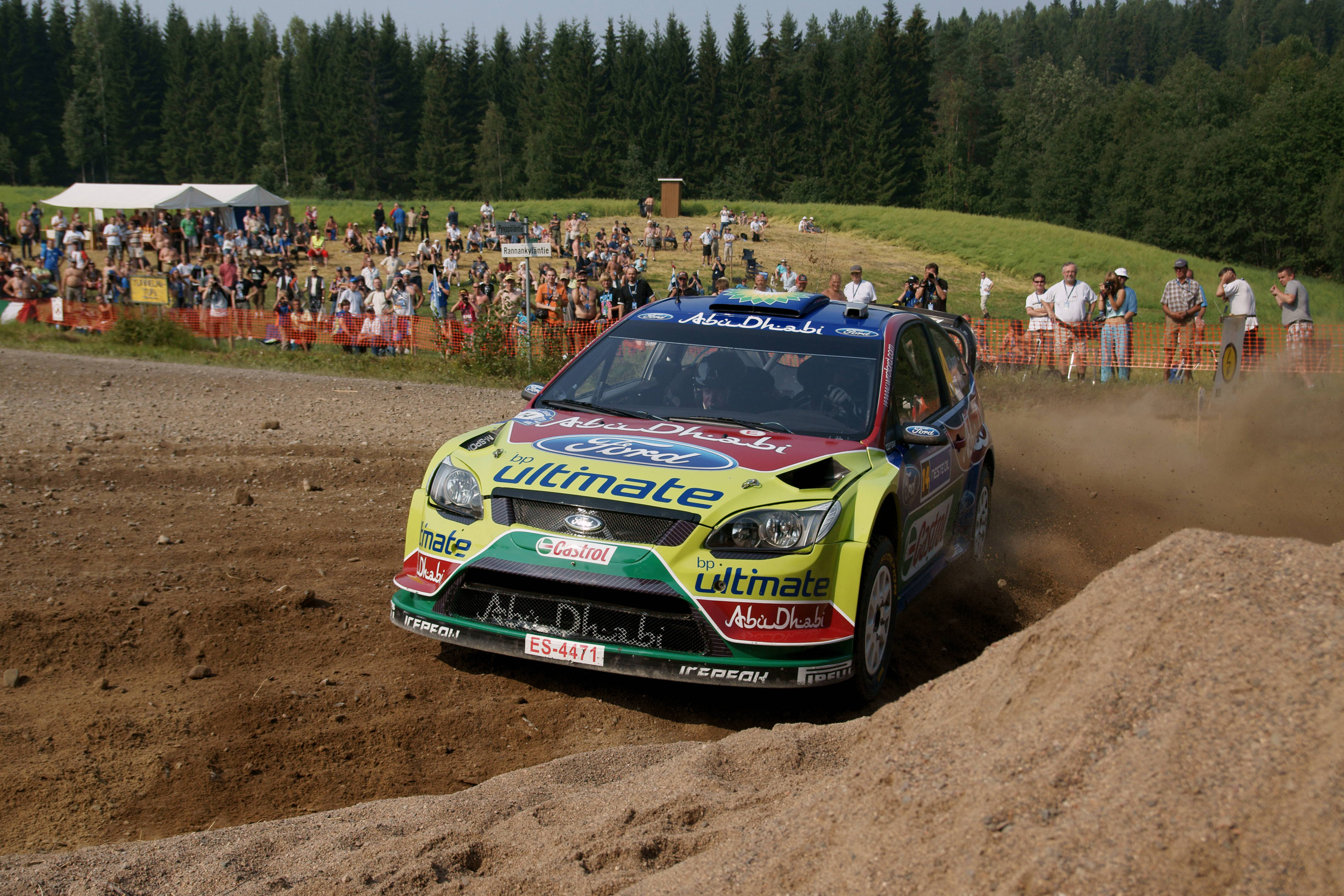
Al Qassimi driving a Ford Focus RS WRC 09 at the 2010 Rally Finland.

At the 2011 Rally Australia, he finished with a career-best fifth place. After a sabbatical year, he returned to the World Rally Championship in 2013, switching to an Abu Dhabi-sponsored Citroën DS3 WRC, claiming two ninth places and a tenth. In 2014, he took tenth place at Sardinia. In 2015, he finished sixth at the Rally Argentina and tenth at Sardinia. He also entered the Middle East Rally Championship with a Citroën DS3 RRC winning at Dubai and finishing second at Qatar and Kuwait.

In 2016, Al Qassimi finished sixth at the Abu Dhabi Desert Challenge.

Al Qassimi entered the 2017 Dakar Rally with a customer Peugeot 2008 DKR.

== Titles ==
Year	Title	Car
2002	FIA Middle East Cup for Drivers of Production Cars Champion	Mitsubishi Lancer Evo 6
2004	FIA Middle East Rally Championship for Drivers Champion	Subaru Impreza WRX STI
2014	FIA Middle East Rally Championship for Drivers Champion	Citroen DS3 / RC2
2017	Abu Dhabi Desert Challenge Champion	Peugeot 3008 DKR
2017	World Cup Champion in Cross Country 2WD	Peugeot 3008 DKR

== WRC results ==
Year	Entrant	Car	1	2	3	4	5	6	7	8	9	10	11	12	13	14	15	16	WDC	Points
2004	Khalid Al Qassimi	Subaru Impreza WRX STi	MON	SWE	MEX	NZL	CYP	GRE; 20	TUR; Ret	ARG	FIN	GER	JPN	GBR	ITA	FRA	ESP	AUS; Ret	NC	0
2005	Khalid Al Qassimi	Subaru Impreza WRX STi	MON	SWE	MEX	NZL	ITA	CYP	TUR; 33	GRE	ARG	FIN	GER	GBR	JPN	FRA	ESP	AUS	NC	0
2006	Khalid Al Qassimi	Subaru Impreza WRX STi	MON	SWE	MEX	ESP	FRA	ARG	ITA	GRE; 23	GER	FIN	JPN	CYP; 13	TUR	AUS	NZL	GBR	NC	0
2007	BP Ford World Rally Team	Ford Focus RS WRC 06	MON	SWE	NOR	MEX	POR	ARG	ITA	GRE	FIN; 16	GER; 16	NZL	ESP; 14	FRA	JPN	IRE; 15	GBR	NC	0
2008	BP Ford Abu Dhabi World Rally Team	Ford Focus RS WRC 07	MON; 16	SWE; 26	MEX	ARG	JOR; 9	ITA; 16	GRE; 12	TUR	FIN; 11								NC	0
2008	BP Ford Abu Dhabi World Rally Team	Ford Focus RS WRC 08										GER; 14	NZL	ESP; 21	FRA; 12	JPN	GBR; 16		NC	0
2009	BP Ford Abu Dhabi World Rally Team	Ford Focus RS WRC 08	IRE; 8	NOR	CYP; 8	POR; 8	ARG	ITA; 15	GRE; 6	POL	FIN; 9	AUS; 19	ESP; 14	GBR; 19					12th	6
2010	BP Ford Abu Dhabi World Rally Team	Ford Focus RS WRC 08	SWE; 13	MEX	JOR	TUR	NZL	POR; 9	BUL	FIN; Ret	GER; 8	JPN; Ret	FRA; 13	ESP; 7	GBR; 11				12th	12
2011	Team Abu Dhabi	Ford Fiesta RS WRC	SWE; 10	MEX	POR; 14	JOR; 8	ITA; 13	ARG	GRE	FIN; 14	GER	AUS; 5	FRA; 12	ESP; 12	GBR				14th	15
2013	Abu Dhabi Citroën Total WRT	Citroën DS3 WRC	MON	SWE; Ret	MEX	POR; 9	ARG	GRE; Ret	ITA; 10	FIN	GER; 11	AUS; 9	FRA	ESP; 11	GBR				21st	5
2014	Citroën Total Abu Dhabi WRT	Citroën DS3 WRC	MON	SWE; 16	MEX	POR; 13	ARG	ITA; 10	POL	FIN	GER	AUS	FRA	ESP; 15	GBR				29th	1
2015	Citroën Total Abu Dhabi WRT	Citroën DS3 WRC	MON	SWE	MEX	ARG; 6	POR; 24	ITA; 10	POL	FIN; 16	GER	AUS	FRA	ESP; 15	GBR				13th	9
2016	Abu Dhabi Total WRT	Citroën DS3 WRC	MON	SWE; 19	MEX	ARG	POR; 26	ITA	POL	FIN; 16	GER	CHN; C	FRA	ESP; 12	GBR	AUS			NC	0
2017	Citroën Total Abu Dhabi WRT	Citroën C3 WRC	MON	SWE	MEX	FRA	ARG	POR; 17	ITA	POL	FIN; 16	GER	ESP; 17	GBR; 22	AUS				NC	0
2018	Citroën Total Abu Dhabi WRT	Citroën C3 WRC	MON	SWE	MEX	FRA	ARG; 14	POR	ITA	FIN; 37	GER	TUR; 15	GBR	ESP; 21	AUS				NC	0

=== PWRC results ===
Year	Entrant	Car	1	2	3	4	5	6	7	8	Pos.	Points
2006	Khalid Al Qassimi	Subaru Impreza WRX STi	MON	MEX	ARG	GRE	JPN	CYP; 3	AUS	NZL	11th	6

Sporting positions
Preceded by Nasser Al-Attiyah	Middle East Rally Champion; 2004	Succeeded by Nasser Al-Attiyah
