= Moza bint Hilal Al Nahyan =

Her Highness Sheikha Moza bint Hilal bin Saqer bin Zayed Al Nahyan (Arabic: الشيخة موزة بنت هلال بن صقر بن زايد آل نهيان) is a member of the royal house of Al Nahyan who rule Abu Dhabi. She is the grand-daughter of Sheikh Saqer (ruler of Abu Dhabi from 1926-1928). Sheikha Moza worked alongside Sheikha Fatima bint Mubarak in setting up the Women's Union, which became the first feminist activity in the UAE.

== Career ==
Sheikha Moza initiated her career as being the secretary general of the Women's Union, and Vice President of the Abu Dhabi Women's Development Society. She was the official representative of Sheikha Fatima bint Mubarak to receive state, local and international diplomatic figures throughout Abu Dhabi. During her career, she held symposiums, conferences and workshops for training and developing UAE women. Sheikha Moza was the first woman to represent UAE in conferences related to women all over the world. As the head of the UAE delegation, she attended international women conferences in Mexico (1975), Copenhagen (1985) and Eastern Germany. She also attended conferences around the Arab World in countries such as Egypt and Syria.

== National Honors ==
- UAE: Zayed the First Ribbon (1998)
- UAE: Awarded with a letter of gratitude and recommendation for recognition for her fruitful efforts and positive cooperation since the establishment of the Women's Union by Sheikha Fatima, wife of Sheikh Zayed, former President of the UAE. (February, 2001)

== Personal life ==
Sheikha Moza is the only child of her father, Hilal. Her mother's family is from the Al Shamsi tribal sheikhs. Sheikha Moza married Sheikh Faisal bin Sultan Al Qassimi and have the following children: Khalid, Basma, Mohammed, Sara, Hessa, Shima, Alyazia, Arwa, and Sultan.
