= 2017 World Rally Championship =

2017 edition of the World Rally Championship

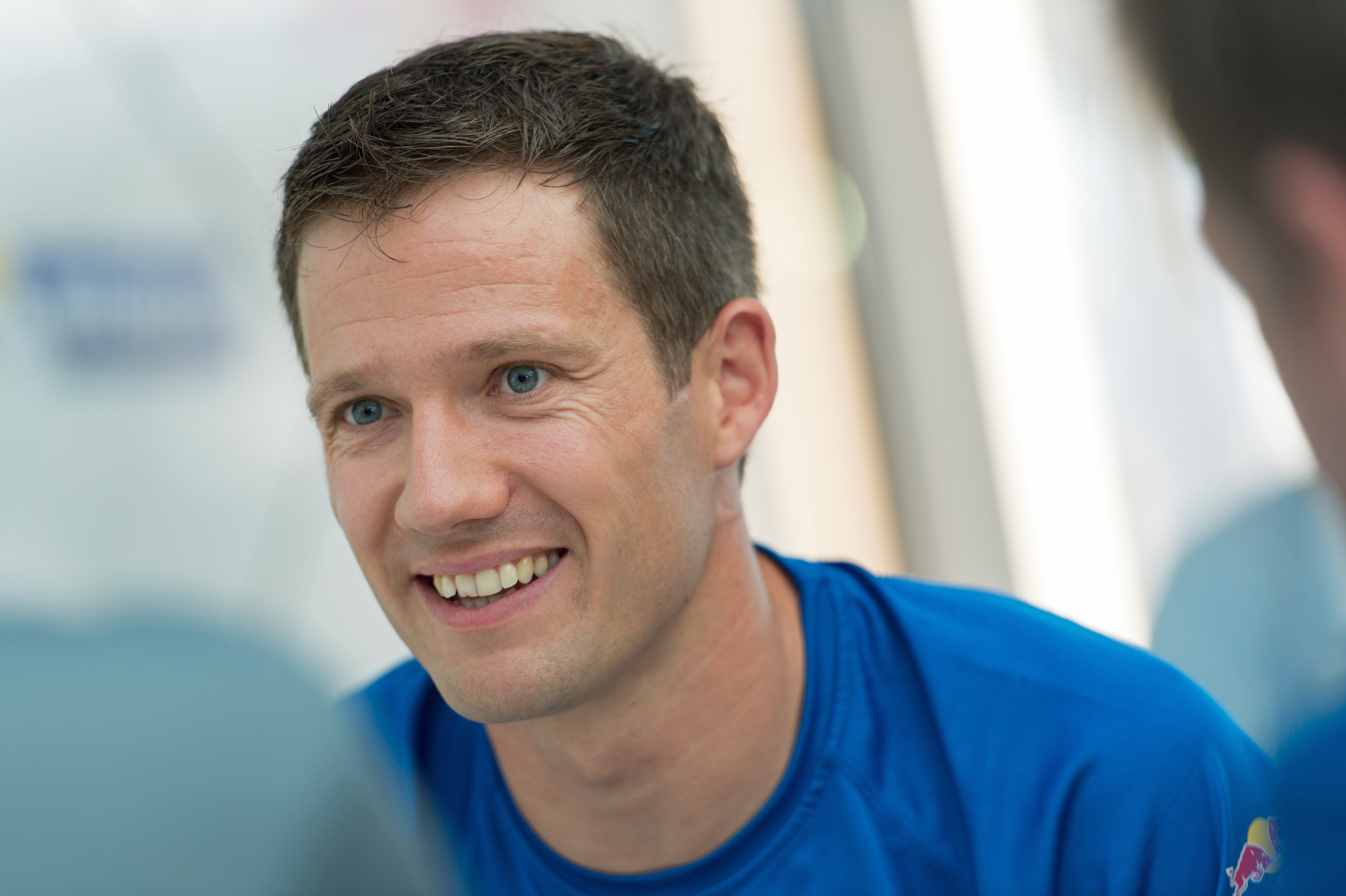
Sébastien Ogier successfully defended the drivers' title.

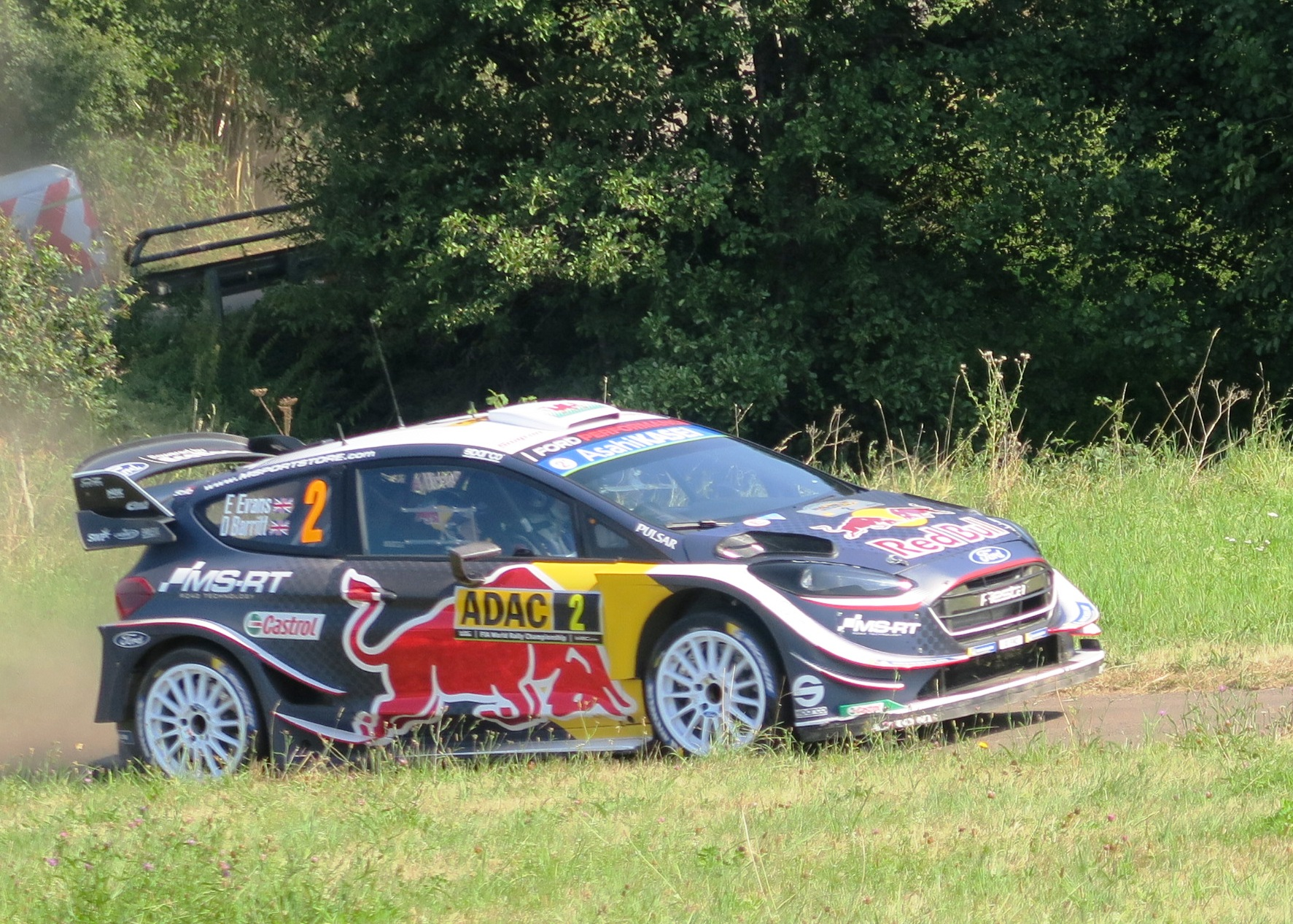
M-Sport World Rally Team won their first World Championship title since 2007.

The 2017 FIA World Rally Championship was the 45th season of the World Rally Championship, a rallying championship recognised by the Fédération Internationale de l'Automobile (FIA) as the highest class of international rallying. Teams and crews contested in thirteen events—starting in Monte Carlo on 19 January and ending in Australia on 19 November—for the World Rally Championships for Drivers, Co-drivers and Manufacturers. Drivers were free to compete in cars complying with World Rally Car and Group R regulations; however, only Manufacturers competing with 2017-specification World Rally Cars were eligible to score points in the Manufacturers' championship. The series were supported by the WRC-2 and WRC-3 championships and the newly created WRC Trophy at every round, and by the Junior WRC at selected rounds.

The 2017 season saw substantial revisions to the technical regulations aimed at improving the performance of the cars and offering teams a greater degree of technical and design freedom. Toyota returned to the sport as a full manufacturer team, entering the Toyota Yaris WRC, as did Citroën, who returned to full-time competition after contesting a partial campaign in 2016. Conversely, Volkswagen formally withdrew from the sport at the end of the 2016 championship.

Sébastien Ogier and Julien Ingrassia started the season as the defending World Drivers' and Co-drivers' Champions after securing their fourth World Championship titles at the 2016 Rally Catalunya. Volkswagen Motorsport, the team Ogier and Ingrassia won their 2016 titles with, were the reigning World Manufacturers' Champions, having secured their fourth title at the 2016 Wales Rally GB. However, the team did not return to defend their title after parent company Volkswagen's withdrawal from the sport.

At the conclusion of the championship, Ogier and Ingrassia successfully defended their championship titles, becoming the second most-successful crew in the sport's history behind Sébastien Loeb and Daniel Elena and only the third crew to win multiple titles with more than one manufacturer. Thierry Neuville and Nicolas Gilsoul finished second, thirty-two points behind Ogier and Ingrassia, while Ott Tänak and Martin Järveoja placed third. In the World Championship for Manufacturers, M-Sport World Rally Team won their first World Championship title since 2007. (Note: M-Sport contested the 2007 championship as Ford World Rally Team. Although a separate team was entered under the name Stobart VK M-Sport Ford Rally Team, all of the cars were entered and operated by M-Sport.) Hyundai Motorsport finished second overall ninety-three points behind M-Sport, with Toyota Gazoo Racing WRT in third.

== Calendar ==
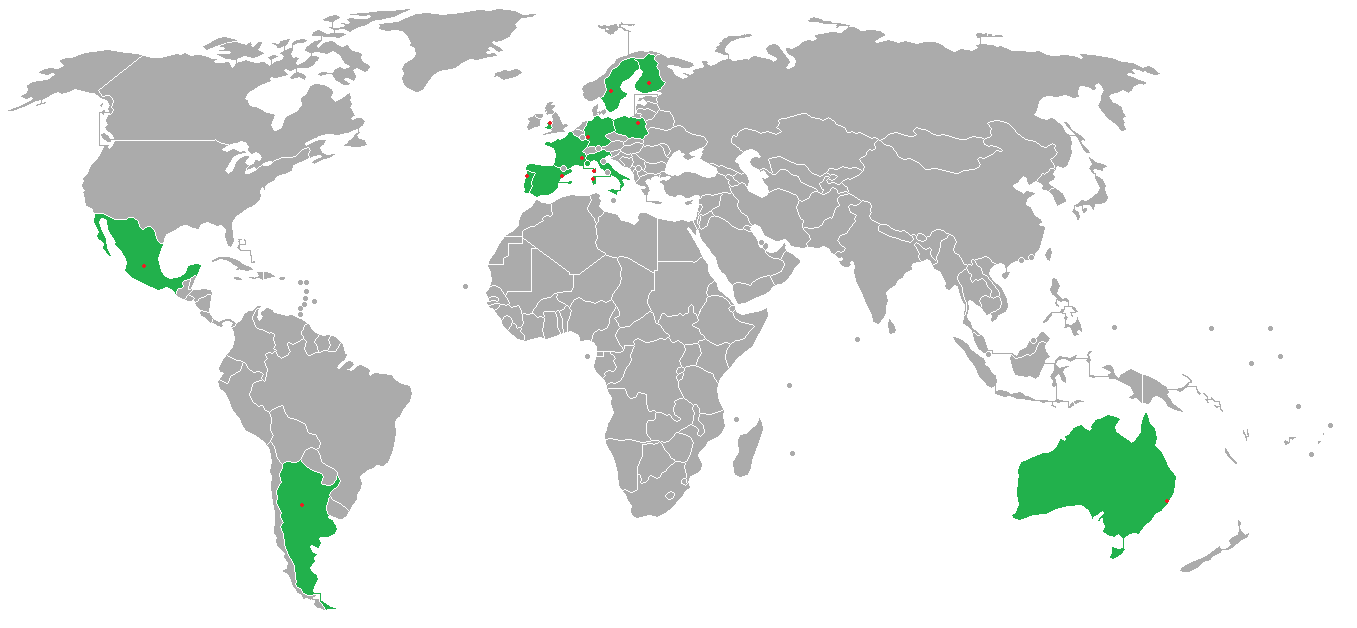
Nations that hosted a rally in 2017 are highlighted in green, with rally headquarters marked by a red dot.

The season was contested over thirteen rounds in Europe, the Americas and Oceania.

Round	Dates		Rally name	Rally headquarters	Rally details		
Round	Start	Finish	Rally name	Rally headquarters	Surface	Stages	Distance
1	19 January	22 January	(Monaco) Monte Carlo Rally	Gap, Hautes-Alpes, France	Mixed (Note: Rallye Monte Carlo was run on a tarmac and snow surface.)	15 (Note: Rallye Monte Carlo was shortened when the first stage was cancelled due to a fatal accident involving a spectator. The sixteenth stage was later cancelled owing to overcrowding of spectators.)	355.96 km
2	9 February	12 February	Rally Sweden	Torsby, Värmland	Snow	17 (Note: Rally Sweden was shortened when the second pass over the Knon stage was cancelled on the advice of the FIA as the leading drivers exceeded the maximum average stage speed of 130 km/h (80.8 mph) during the first run through the stage.)	305.83 km
3	9 March	12 March	Rally Mexico	León, Guanajuato	Gravel	17 (Note: Rally Mexico had its route shortened when a highway accident prevented the cars being transported to León in time for the start of the first stages.)	231.25 km
4	7 April	9 April	(France) Tour de Corse	Bastia, Haute-Corse	Tarmac	10	316.76 km
5	27 April	30 April	Rally Argentina	Villa Carlos Paz, Córdoba	Gravel	18	356.49 km
6	18 May	21 May	Rally de Portugal	Matosinhos, Porto	Gravel	19	349.17 km
7	8 June	11 June	(Italy) Rally Italia Sardegna	Alghero, Sardinia	Gravel	19	312.66 km
8	29 June	2 July	Rally Poland	Mikołajki, Warmia-Masuria	Gravel	22 (Note: The sixth stage of Rally Poland was cancelled after heavy rains in the region created large puddles of standing water on the stage which was subsequently deemed too dangerous.)	338.34 km
9	27 July	30 July	Rally Finland	Jyväskylä, Keski-Suomi	Gravel	25	315.62 km
10	17 August	20 August	(Germany) Rallye Deutschland	Saarbrücken, Saarland	Tarmac	21	309.17 km
11	6 October	8 October	(Spain) Rally Catalunya	Salou, Tarragona	Mixed (Note: Rally Catalunya was run on a tarmac and gravel surface.)	19	312.02 km
12	26 October	29 October	(United Kingdom) Wales Rally GB	Deeside, Flintshire	Gravel	20	306.13 km
13	17 November	19 November	Rally Australia	Coffs Harbour, New South Wales	Gravel	19 (Note: Rally Australia had its route shortened after a bridge in the Newry stage was found to be damaged, making the second pass over the stage impossible to complete. The penultimate stage, Pilbara Reverse 2, was also cancelled after heavy rain made conditions unsafe.)	287.68 km

=== Calendar changes ===
The FIA re-organised the calendar for the 2017 season to include a greater variation in surfaces between events, bringing the Tour de Corse forward from October to April. The decision was made after concerns were expressed about the 2016 calendar, which originally contained six consecutive gravel events followed by four tarmac rallies.

The Rally of China was removed from the calendar. The event had been included on the 2016 calendar before storm damage to the proposed route forced its cancellation. The round was removed from the 2017 calendar to give event organisers more time to prepare for a future bid to rejoin the calendar. Similarly, the FIA put the Rallies of Argentina and Poland on notice regarding safety concerns, threatening to rescind their World Championship status for the 2017 season unless safety standards were improved in 2016, with drivers citing a lack of safety marshalls and expressing concerns over spectators getting too close to the cars as the main areas to be addressed. Both events were subsequently included on the calendar.

The Rallies of Sweden and Germany changed their headquarters. The Rally of Sweden stayed within Värmland County, but relocated from Karlstad to Torsby. The Rally of Germany moved from Trier in Rhineland-Palatine to Saarbrücken in the neighbouring state of Saarland.

=== Route changes ===
The Rallye Monte-Carlo introduced a heavily revised itinerary, with eighty-five percent of the route used in 2016 being revised for the 2017 event, which saw the competitive distance increase from 337.59 km to 382.65 km and included the Col de Turini as part of the Power Stage. Rally Sweden adjusted its route to remove the emphasis on purpose-built stages that had filled out the event itinerary in previous years. The new route raised the average speed of the rally and introduced more competitive mileage in Hedmark County in neighbouring Norway.

Rally Mexico also featured route revisions, with the eighty-kilometre Guanajuato stage—the longest in the championship in 2016—removed from the schedule; however, the addition of new stages and further changes to existing ones meant that the overall competitive distance of the 2017 rally was only six kilometres shorter than the route used in the 2016 event. The rally started in Mexico City with a spectator-friendly stage before moving to its traditional headquarters in León. The Tour de Corse shortened its route by seventy-four kilometres, from 390.92 km in 2016 down to 316.76 km in 2017, with most of the changes coming from shortening each of the individual stages used in 2016. Rally Portugal shortened its route by twenty kilometres, reintroducing stages that had not been used for several years and reconfiguring stages from the 2016 event. Rally Poland also revised its route, introducing a series of brand-new stages close to the Russian border. The changes saw the crews compete on a wider ranges of surfaces—including tarmac and cobblestones—within individual stages, although the rally was still officially classified as a gravel surface event.

Following the cancellation of stages in Rally Sweden when the front-running cars exceeded the maximum average speed mandated by the FIA, Rally Finland was forced to revise its route to find ways of keeping the average stage speed down—with some estimates predicting that the 2017 generation of cars could exceed 140 km/h (87.0 mph)—to avoid stage cancellations. This was achieved by installing artificial chicanes into all but two of the stages, which proved to be controversial as drivers complained that they were too narrow and thus had the potential to damage cars, and were poorly-positioned with little regulatory oversight from rally organisers. With Rallye Deutschland moving to a new headquarters, the rally routed was revised. The vineyard and military proving ground stages in the Baumholder region were retained, but the final leg of the route was changed to introduce high-speed stages based on country lanes.

Rally Catalunya introduced several new and returning stages to its route, focusing on the tarmac legs of the event. Organisers of the Wales Rally GB retained the event route used in 2016, but revised the itinerary to increase its difficulty, with the route featuring earlier start times, later finishes and the reintroduction of night stages. Rally Australia underwent route revisions, introducing a new loop of stages north of the rally headquarters in Coffs Harbour. The new stages were designed to be faster and more technical than in previous events.

== Entries ==
The following teams and drivers were entered for the rallies in the 2017 World Rally Championship:

World Rally Car entries eligible to score manufacturer points
Manufacturer	Entrant	Car	Tyre	No.	Drivers	Co-drivers	Rounds
Ford	(United Kingdom) M-Sport World Rally Team	Ford Fiesta WRC	M	1	(France) Sébastien Ogier	(France) Julien Ingrassia	All
Ford	(United Kingdom) M-Sport World Rally Team	Ford Fiesta WRC	M	2	(Estonia) Ott Tänak	(Estonia) Martin Järveoja	All
Ford	(United Kingdom) M-Sport World Rally Team	Ford Fiesta WRC	D	3	(United Kingdom) Elfyn Evans	(United Kingdom) Daniel Barritt	All
Hyundai	(South Korea) Hyundai Motorsport	Hyundai i20 Coupe WRC	M	4	(New Zealand) Hayden Paddon	(New Zealand) John Kennard	1–5
Hyundai	(South Korea) Hyundai Motorsport	Hyundai i20 Coupe WRC	M	4	(New Zealand) Hayden Paddon	(United Kingdom) Sebastian Marshall	6–10, 12–13
Hyundai	(South Korea) Hyundai Motorsport	Hyundai i20 Coupe WRC	M	4	(Norway) Andreas Mikkelsen	(Norway) Anders Jæger	11
Hyundai	(South Korea) Hyundai Motorsport	Hyundai i20 Coupe WRC	M	5	(Belgium) Thierry Neuville	(Belgium) Nicolas Gilsoul	All
Hyundai	(South Korea) Hyundai Motorsport	Hyundai i20 Coupe WRC	M	6	(Spain) Dani Sordo	(Spain) Marc Martí	1–11
Hyundai	(South Korea) Hyundai Motorsport	Hyundai i20 Coupe WRC	M	6	(Norway) Andreas Mikkelsen	(Norway) Anders Jæger	12–13
Citroën	(France) Citroën Total Abu Dhabi WRT	Citroën C3 WRC	M	7	(United Kingdom) Kris Meeke	(Republic of Ireland) Paul Nagle	1–7, 9–11
Citroën	(France) Citroën Total Abu Dhabi WRT	Citroën C3 WRC	M	7	(Norway) Andreas Mikkelsen	(Norway) Anders Jæger	8
Citroën	(France) Citroën Total Abu Dhabi WRT	Citroën C3 WRC	M	7	(United Arab Emirates) Khalid Al Qassimi	(United Kingdom) Chris Patterson	12
Citroën	(France) Citroën Total Abu Dhabi WRT	Citroën C3 WRC	M	7	(France) Stéphane Lefebvre	(France) Gabin Moreau	13
Citroën	(France) Citroën Total Abu Dhabi WRT	Citroën C3 WRC	M	8	(France) Stéphane Lefebvre	(France) Gabin Moreau	1, 3, 11
Citroën	(France) Citroën Total Abu Dhabi WRT	Citroën C3 WRC	M	8	(Republic of Ireland) Craig Breen	(United Kingdom) Scott Martin	2, 4–8, 10, 12–13
Citroën	(France) Citroën Total Abu Dhabi WRT	Citroën C3 WRC	M	8	(United Arab Emirates) Khalid Al Qassimi	(United Kingdom) Chris Patterson	9
Citroën	(France) Citroën Total Abu Dhabi WRT	Citroën C3 WRC	M	9	(France) Stéphane Lefebvre	(France) Gabin Moreau	4, 6, 8
Citroën	(France) Citroën Total Abu Dhabi WRT	Citroën C3 WRC	M	9	(Norway) Andreas Mikkelsen	(Norway) Anders Jæger	7, 10
Citroën	(France) Citroën Total Abu Dhabi WRT	Citroën C3 WRC	M	9	(Republic of Ireland) Craig Breen	(United Kingdom) Scott Martin	9
Citroën	(France) Citroën Total Abu Dhabi WRT	Citroën C3 WRC	M	9	(United Arab Emirates) Khalid Al Qassimi	(United Kingdom) Chris Patterson	11
Citroën	(France) Citroën Total Abu Dhabi WRT	Citroën C3 WRC	M	9	(United Kingdom) Kris Meeke	(Republic of Ireland) Paul Nagle	12–13
Toyota	(Japan) Toyota Gazoo Racing WRT	Toyota Yaris WRC	M	10	(Finland) Jari-Matti Latvala	(Finland) Miikka Anttila	All
Toyota	(Japan) Toyota Gazoo Racing WRT	Toyota Yaris WRC	M	11	(Finland) Juho Hänninen	(Finland) Kaj Lindström	1–12
Toyota	(Japan) Toyota Gazoo Racing WRT	Toyota Yaris WRC	M	11	(Finland) Esapekka Lappi	(Finland) Janne Ferm	13
Toyota	(Japan) Toyota Gazoo Racing WRT	Toyota Yaris WRC	M	12	(Finland) Esapekka Lappi	(Finland) Janne Ferm	6–12

World Rally Car entries ineligible to score manufacturer points
Manufacturer	Entrant	Car	Tyre	No.	Drivers	Co-drivers	Rounds
Citroën	(France) Citroën Total Abu Dhabi WRT	Citroën DS3 WRC	M	14	(Republic of Ireland) Craig Breen	(United Kingdom) Scott Martin	1
Citroën	(France) Citroën Total Abu Dhabi WRT	Citroën DS3 WRC	M	15	(France) Stéphane Lefebvre	(France) Gabin Moreau	2
Citroën	(Greece) Jourdan Serderidis	Citroën DS3 WRC	M	15	(Greece) Jourdan Serderidis	(Belgium) Frédéric Miclotte	12
Citroën	(Greece) Jourdan Serderidis	Citroën DS3 WRC	M	20	(Greece) Jourdan Serderidis	(Belgium) Frédéric Miclotte	1
Citroën	(Greece) Jourdan Serderidis	Citroën DS3 WRC	M	21	(Greece) Jourdan Serderidis	(Belgium) Frédéric Miclotte	13
Citroën	(Greece) Jourdan Serderidis	Citroën DS3 WRC	M	22	(Greece) Jourdan Serderidis	(Belgium) Lara Vanneste	8
Citroën	(Greece) Jourdan Serderidis	Citroën DS3 WRC	M	22	(Greece) Jourdan Serderidis	(Belgium) Frédéric Miclotte	11
Citroën	(Greece) Jourdan Serderidis	Citroën DS3 WRC	M	23	(Greece) Jourdan Serderidis	(Belgium) Frédéric Miclotte	10
Citroën	(France) Jean-Michel Raoux	Citroën DS3 WRC	D	21	(France) Jean-Michel Raoux	(France) Laurent Magat	11
Citroën	(France) Jean-Michel Raoux	Citroën DS3 WRC	D	22	(France) Jean-Michel Raoux	(France) Laurent Magat	7, 9–10
Citroën	(France) Jean-Michel Raoux	Citroën DS3 WRC	D	23	(France) Jean-Michel Raoux	(France) Laurent Magat	8
Citroën	(France) Jean-Michel Raoux	Citroën DS3 WRC	D	23	(France) Jean-Michel Raoux	(France) Thomas Escartefigue	6
Citroën	(France) Citroën Total Abu Dhabi WRT	Citroën C3 WRC	M	15	(United Arab Emirates) Khalid Al Qassimi	(United Kingdom) Chris Patterson	6
Ford	(United Kingdom) M-Sport World Rally Team	Ford Fiesta WRC	M	14	(Norway) Mads Østberg	(Norway) Ola Fløene	2, 5, 7–8
Ford	(United Kingdom) M-Sport World Rally Team	Ford Fiesta WRC	M	14	(Norway) Mads Østberg	(Norway) Torstein Eriksen	9, 11
Ford	(United Kingdom) M-Sport World Rally Team	Ford Fiesta WRC	M	14	(Norway) Mads Østberg	(Sweden) Emil Axelsson	12
Ford	(United Kingdom) M-Sport World Rally Team	Ford Fiesta WRC	D	14	(Norway) Mads Østberg	(Norway) Ola Fløene	6
Ford	(United Kingdom) M-Sport World Rally Team	Ford Fiesta WRC	M	14	(Germany) Armin Kremer	(Germany) Pirmin Winklhofer	10
Ford	(United Kingdom) M-Sport World Rally Team	Ford Fiesta WRC	M	15	(Finland) Teemu Suninen	(Finland) Mikko Markkula	8–9
Ford	(United Kingdom) M-Sport World Rally Team	Ford Fiesta WRC	M	37	(Italy) Lorenzo Bertelli	(Italy) Simone Scattolin	3, 5
Ford	(Saudi Arabia) Yazeed Racing	Ford Fiesta RS WRC	M	20	(Saudi Arabia) Yazeed Al Rajhi	(United Kingdom) Michael Orr	7, 12
Ford	(Czech Republic) OneBet Jipocar World Rally Team	Ford Fiesta RS WRC	D	21	(Czech Republic) Martin Prokop	(Czech Republic) Jan Tománek	6–7
Ford	(Italy) FWRT	Ford Fiesta RS WRC	M	37	(Italy) Lorenzo Bertelli	(Italy) Simone Scattolin	2
Ford	(France) Armando Pereira	Ford Fiesta RS WRC	M	81	(France) Armando Pereira	(France) Rémi Tutélaire	4
Ford	(France) Alain Vauthier	Ford Fiesta RS WRC	M	82	(France) Alain Vauthier	(France) Stevie Nollet	4
Ford	(Italy) Paolo Liceri	Ford Fiesta RS WRC	M	82	(Italy) Paolo Liceri	(Italy) Salvatore Mendola	7
Ford	(United Kingdom) Charles Payne	Ford Fiesta RS WRC	P	86	(United Kingdom) Charles Payne	(United Kingdom) Carl Williamson	12
Ford	(Italy) Simone Romagna	Ford Fiesta RS WRC	M	99	(Italy) Simone Romagna	(Italy) Massimiliano Bosi	7
Hyundai	(South Korea) Hyundai Motorsport	Hyundai i20 Coupe WRC	M	16	(Spain) Dani Sordo	(Spain) Marc Martí	12
Mini	(Ukraine) Eurolamp World Rally Team	Mini John Cooper Works WRC	M	12	(Ukraine) Valeriy Gorban	(Estonia) Sergei Larens	3
Mini	(Ukraine) Eurolamp World Rally Team	Mini John Cooper Works WRC	M	15	(Ukraine) Valeriy Gorban	(Estonia) Sergei Larens	5
Mini	(Ukraine) Eurolamp World Rally Team	Mini John Cooper Works WRC	M	16	(Ukraine) Valeriy Gorban	(Estonia) Sergei Larens	2
Mini	(Ukraine) Eurolamp World Rally Team	Mini John Cooper Works WRC	M	20	(Ukraine) Valeriy Gorban	(Estonia) Sergei Larens	11
Mini	(Ukraine) Eurolamp World Rally Team	Mini John Cooper Works WRC	M	21	(Ukraine) Valeriy Gorban	(Estonia) Sergei Larens	8–9
Mini	(Ukraine) Eurolamp World Rally Team	Mini John Cooper Works WRC	M	22	(Ukraine) Valeriy Gorban	(Estonia) Sergei Larens	6

=== Team and crew changes ===
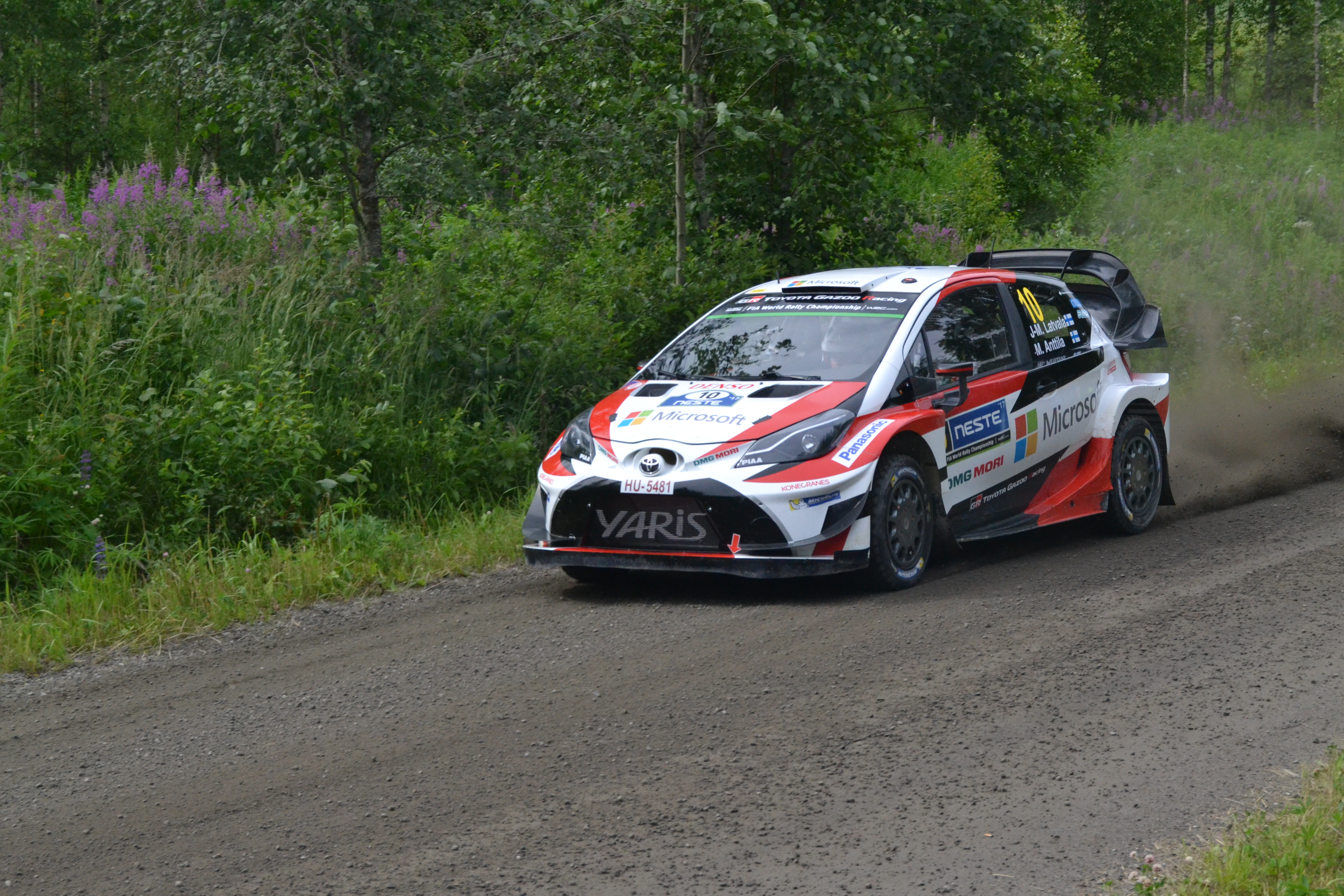
Toyota returned to the World Rally Championship in 2017 with the Toyota Yaris WRC.

M-Sport entered the Ford Fiesta WRC, based on the Fiesta RS WRC and updated to fit the 2017 regulation. The team secured Sébastien Ogier and Julien Ingrassia to drive one car, and re-hired Ott Tänak, who returned to the team after contesting the 2016 season with DMACK World Rally Team. Tänak changed co-drivers, with Martin Järveoja replacing Raigo Mõlder. Elfyn Evans and Daniel Barritt returned to the premier class after contesting the 2016 season in the WRC-2 category, swapping places Eric Camilli and Benjamin Veillas, who stayed with M-Sport and were entered in the WRC-2.

M-Sport resumed their practice of promoting their junior drivers for guest appearances, starting with Teemu Suninen at the Rally of Poland. Suninen will be partnered by his regular WRC2 co-driver, Mikko Markkula. The team also continued to operate their customer programme, with Adapta World Rally Team returning to the sport and merging with Jipocar Czech National Team to form the OneBet Jipocar World Rally Team, starting the season from the 65th Rally Sweden. (Note: Under rules introduced for the 2017 season, only manufacturers are permitted to enter 2017-specification cars. As such, the OneBet Jipocar and FWRT entries are officially a part of M-Sport, but are treated as a separate entity by the team.) Mads Østberg and Ola Fløene competed in a Fiesta WRC, with the team expanding to two cars later in the season; the second, an older-model Fiesta RS WRC, will be driven by Martin Prokop and Jan Tománek, who return to the World Rally Championship after missing the second half of the 2016 season. Lorenzo Bertelli, Simone Scattolin and their FWRT team acquired a Fiesta for the Rally Mexico, which like the OneBet Jipocar entry, was run by M-Sport. DMACK World Rally Team will no longer operate as a customer team, instead becoming a partner and supplier of M-Sport, providing tyres and sponsorship for Elfyn Evans' entry.

Hyundai entered a three-door variant of the i20 WRC, known as the i20 Coupe WRC, having used the five-door model in competition throughout the 2016 season. The team had previously used a three-door model in 2014 and 2015 before being forced to adopt the five-door model in 2016 for logistical reasons. However, the team considered the three-door model to be better-suited to competition, and developed the i20 Coupe WRC around it. Hyundai elected to retain the three crews—Thierry Neuville and Nicolas Gilsoul, Hayden Paddon and John Kennard, and Dani Sordo and Marc Martí—who drove for the team in 2016 to contest their 2017 campaign. Following the Rally of Mexico, Hyundai announced that Paddon and Kennard would part ways after a twelve-year partnership, with Sebastian Marshall becoming Paddon's new co-driver.

Citroën returned to the sport with a fully factory-supported team after competing part-time in 2016 to focus on the development of their 2017-generation car. The DS3 WRC was succeeded by the C3 WRC, a brand-new car based on the Citroën C3. The decision to re-enter the World Rally Championship coincided with Citroën withdrawing its factory support for the Citroën C-Elysée WTCC and its World Touring Car Championship programme. The team signed Kris Meeke and co-driver Paul Nagle to contest the full season, while Craig Breen and Scott Martin shared a car with Stéphane Lefebvre between events—as they did in 2016—until the Tour de Corse, when a third C3 WRC became available; Citroën also entered a DS3 WRC for Breen and Lefebvre in the opening rounds. Gabin Moreau returned as Lefebvre's co-driver following an injury at the 34. Rallye Deutschland that saw him sit out the final events of the 2016 season. Lefebvre and Moreau were later replaced for the Rally Sardinia by Andreas Mikkelsen and Anders Jæger, who had started the season contesting the WRC2 in a Škoda Fabia R5. Mikkelsen and Jæger went on to rotate between Citroën's entries before switching to Hyundai for the final rounds of the championship. Khalid Al Qassimi contested selected events in a fourth C3 WRC.

Toyota returned to the sport after eighteen years, entering the brand-new Toyota Yaris WRC under the banner of Toyota Gazoo Racing WRT. The development and operation of the cars is overseen by four-time World Drivers' Champion Tommi Mäkinen. Jari-Matti Latvala and co-driver Miikka Anttila left Volkswagen Motorsport following the team's withdrawal from the sport to join Toyota, where they are partnered with Juho Hänninen—who returned to the championship for the first time since 2014—and Kaj Lindström. Reigning WRC-2 champions Esapekka Lappi and Janne Ferm made their début in a WRC specification car, contesting a partial campaign from the Rally of Portugal. Toyota last competed in the sport as a factory-supported team between 1997 and 1999 with the Toyota Corolla WRC before withdrawing ahead of the 2000 season to focus on its Formula One project.

Volkswagen scaled back their involvement in the sport, withdrawing their entry as a manufacturer at the end of the 2016 season and cancelling the Polo R WRC programme in light of the emissions scandal that broke in 2015. Volkswagen instead switched focus from a factory-supported team to a customer programme with a Polo rally car built to R5 regulations and scheduled for introduction in 2018. The 2016 specification of the Polo R WRC was made available to privateer entries and the 2017 model, known as the Polo WRC, was abandoned after the FIA denied an exemption to homologation regulations that would have allowed the Polo WRC to compete in 2017.

== Regulation changes ==
=== Technical regulations ===
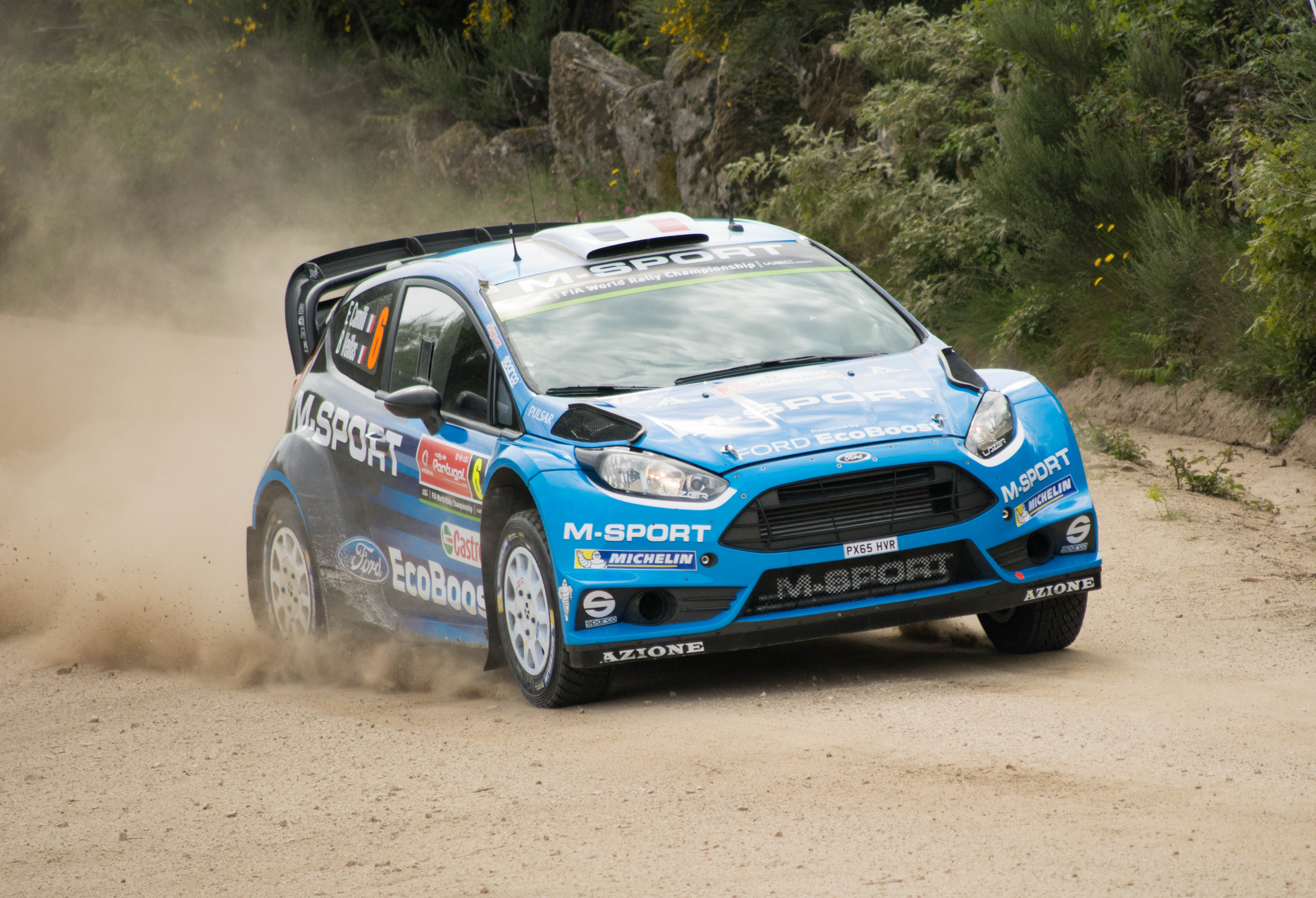

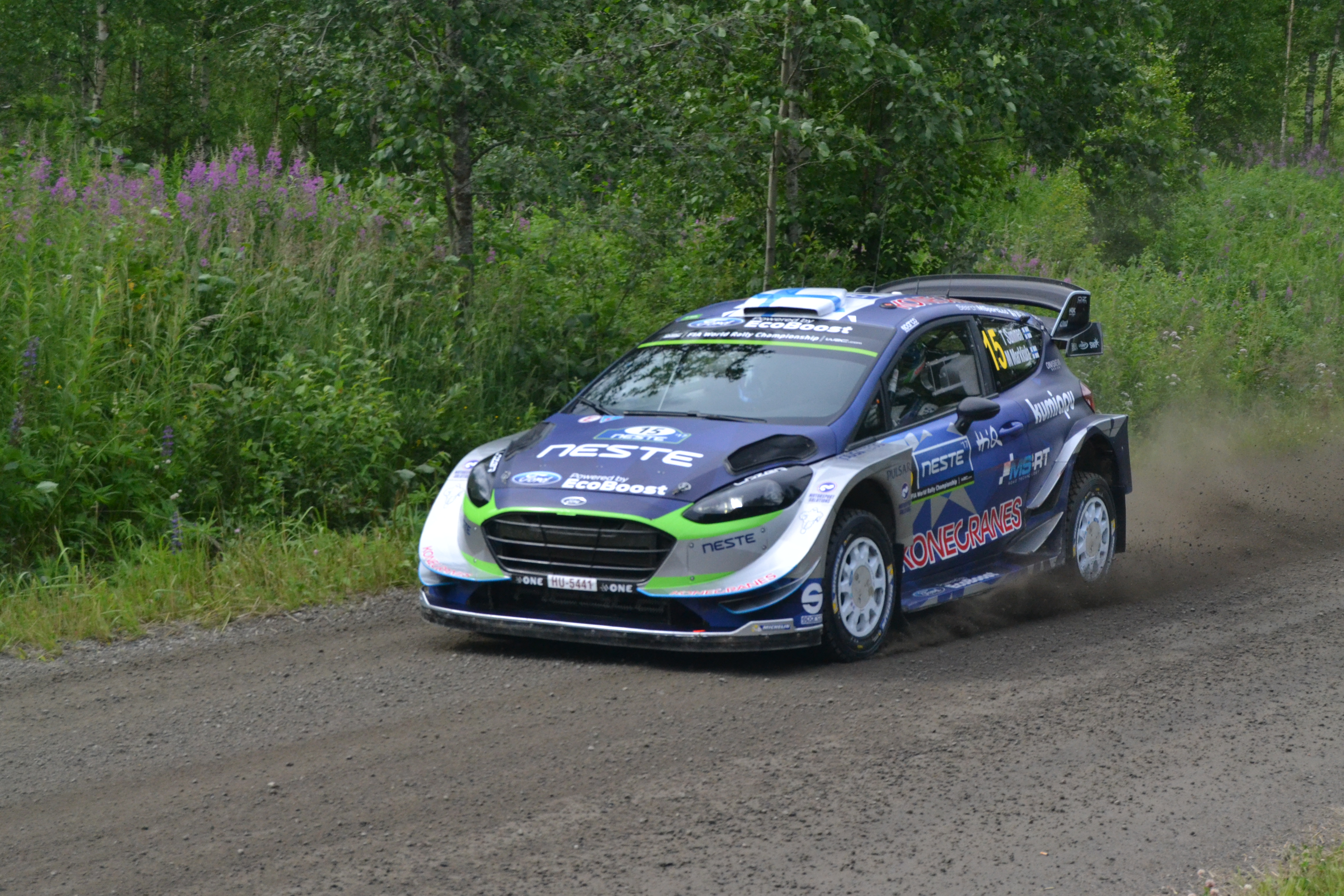
A comparison between the 2016 Ford Fiesta RS WRC (top) and 2017 Ford Fiesta WRC (bottom) showing the more complex aerodynamic devices on the front of the car and the larger rear wings used in 2017.

The sport underwent a revision of the technical regulations for 2017, introducing a variety of changes aimed at improving aerodynamic and mechanical grip, with modelling suggesting that average stage speeds are expected to increase to the point where stage records could be broken by up to thirty seconds and drawing comparisons to the defunct Group B regulations. These changes include:

- An increase in the power output of the engine, from 300 bhp (223.7 kW) to 380 bhp (283.4 kW), the equivalent of a TC1-specification World Touring Car Championship engine. The engine will be capable of producing 450 N⋅m (331.9 lb⋅ft) of torque.
- A larger turbo restrictor, increasing from 33mm in 2016 to 36mm in 2017; however, the maximum allowable turbo pressure remains fixed at 2.5 bar absolute.
- A reduction of the overall weight of the car, cutting 25 kg (55.1 lb) from the monocoque.
- An increase in the overhang of the front and rear bumpers and increases in the size of the door sills, door pillars and the fixed rear wing, permitting the inclusion of additional aerodynamic aids, all aimed at improving aerodynamic grip. However, the bodywork of the 2017 model must be able to cover the bodywork of the 2016 model of car.
- Deregulation of the rules governing the rear diffuser to allow manufacturers to develop a wider range of aerodynamic shapes. There was also further deregulation of the rules governing the wheel arches, allowing the introduction of additional brake cooling ducts.
- The reintroduction of an active centre differential for the first time since the 2010 season. Similarly, electronic differentials are permitted in the sport for the first time.

In order to promote further manufacturer participation, homologation requirements were relaxed to allow any production car that is at least 3.9 m (12.8 ft) long to be eligible for recognition as a World Rally Car. The designs of the cars were to be finalised by September 2016 and submitted for homologation by 1 November 2016.

=== Sporting regulations ===
The points-scoring system for the World Championship for Manufacturers was changed, with manufacturers permitted to enter at least two and as many as three crews in each round, with the best two results being awarded points. Changes were also made to the points awarded for the Power Stage, with points awarded to the top five drivers.

The FIA exercised stricter controls over which drivers are eligible to compete in 2017-specification cars by only permitting registered manufacturers to enter 2017-specification cars. The rule was introduced as a response to concerns over inexperienced drivers and drivers paying for the opportunity to race being able to compete in the more powerful 2017 cars without oversight. The controls stop short of a licensing system similar to the one used in Formula One to allow experienced guest drivers to compete part-time. To complement this, a new privateers' championship known as the WRC Trophy was added for crews entering World Rally Cars used between 2011 and 2016. Crews competing in the WRC Trophy had to nominate seven rounds at which they were eligible to score points, with their six best results counting towards their final points tally.

Further changes were made to the sporting regulations, with the rules governing the running order—the order in which crews enter a stage—reverting to the system used in 2014 to address concerns over road sweeping, whereby championship leaders were forced to clear the roads of loose gravel, costing them time and exposing the harder-packed and faster road base for following drivers to take advantage of. Under the reintroduced rules, the crews will enter a stage in championship order for the first day of competition, and then in reverse championship order for the remaining legs of the event.

== Season report ==
=== Monte Carlo Rally ===
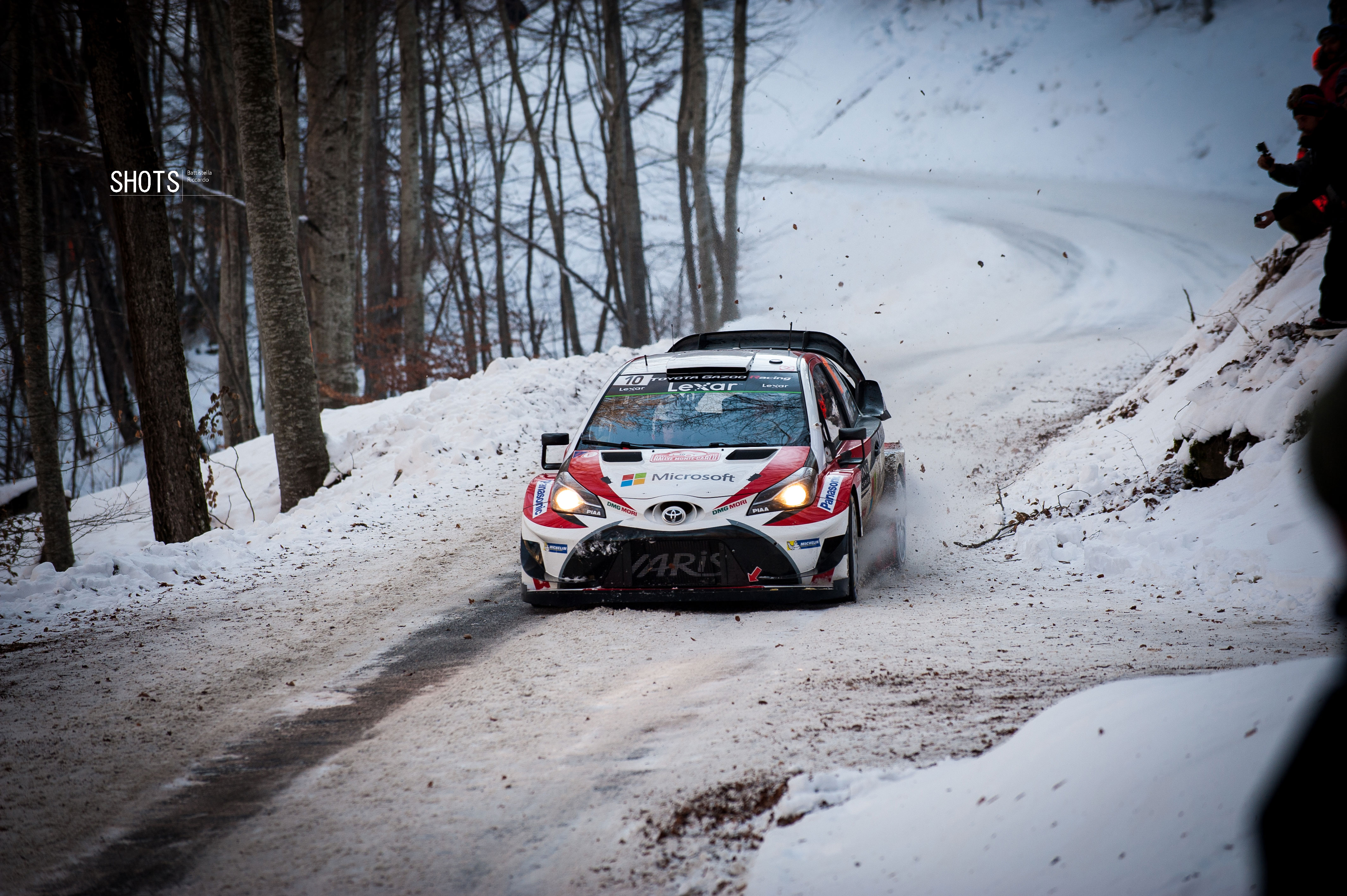
Toyota scored a podium on their return to the WRC in Monte Carlo.

Rallye Monte Carlo saw Sébastien Ogier and Julien Ingrassia start their title defence with a win, recording their fourth victory in the event and M-Sport's first win since the 68th Wales Rally GB in 2012. (Note: M-Sport contested the 2012 season under the name Ford World Rally Team.) Jari-Matti Latvala and Miikka Anttila finished second on Toyota's return to the sport, with Ott Tänak and Martin Järveoja completing the podium. Thierry Neuville established an early lead as the opening stages were marked by attrition; Ogier lost forty seconds when he slid into a ditch, Kris Meeke and Juho Hänninen crashed out and restarted the next day with a penalty, Stéphane Lefebvre suffered a gearbox failure, and Elfyn Evans struggled for grip on the icy surface. Neuville carried the overnight lead from Ogier, who had recovered from ninth after his off, and Tänak. Neuville extended his lead to over a minute on the second leg of the rally as Ogier took a conservative approach to the icy roads. He gradually started to recover during the second pass over the day's stages, and inherited the lead when Neuville crashed on the final stage of the day, breaking his suspension and losing half an hour. Neuville's accident also handed Jari-Matti Latvala a provisional podium position. Dani Sordo encountered problems in the sister Hyundai, struggling with a loss of power steering, while Meeke was forced to retire after a collision on the road section between stages. Meanwhile, Evans regained his confidence on the dry tarmac and won three of the day's five stages to secure sixth place going into the final day of competition. The final leg of the rally saw Tänak develop a misfire that allowed Latvala to pass him for second and left him vulnerable to Sordo. A late change in the weather on the final stage left the field contending with difficult conditions; while Ogier and Latvala drove conservatively to secure first and second, Tänak withstood pressure from Sordo to finish third. Sordo and co-driver Marc Martí finished the event fourth ahead of Craig Breen and Scott Martin who were the leading Citroën crew despite driving a year-old DS3 WRC. Elfyn Evans and Daniel Barritt finished sixth, while seventh and eighth place went to WRC2 entries; driving a Škoda Fabia R5 in a guest appearance, Andreas Mikkelsen and Anders Jæger finished ahead of Škoda Motorsport teammates Jan Kopecký and Pavel Dresler. Stéphane Lefebvre and Gabin Moreau overcame their penalty for restarting under Rally-2 regulations to finish ninth, while WRC-2 entrants Bryan Bouffier and Denis Giraudet completed the top ten in a Ford Fiesta R5. Thierry Neuville and Nicolas Gilsoul scored an additional five points for winning the Power Stage.

The rally was overshadowed by a fatal accident involving a spectator on the opening stage when Hayden Paddon lost control on a patch of black ice and hit the spectator as he rolled into an embankment, blocking the roadway. The stage was stopped—and ultimately cancelled—as medical attention was sought and the car cleared away, but the spectator later died of his injuries. Although eligible to restart under Rally-2 regulations, Paddon withdrew from the event.

=== Rally Sweden ===
Jari-Matti Latvala and Miikka Anttila won the Rally of Sweden, and combined with five bonus points for winning the Power Stage, took the lead of the drivers' and co-drivers' championships. The result marked Toyota's first World Rally Championship victory since Didier Auriol and Denis Giraudet won the 3rd China Rally in 1999. Ott Tänak and Martin Järveoja finished second, while Sébastien Ogier and Julien Ingrassia completed the podium and allowed M-Sport to retain the manufacturers' championship lead. The first day of competition saw Thierry Neuville and Latvala emerged as the early contenders for the rally lead as drivers reported that the rough surface and frequent jumps interrupted the airflow over the cars and making the level of aerodynamic grip available inconsistent. As the crews began their second pass over the day's stages, the icy road surface began to break up enabling Neuville—whose road position meant that he had experience with the degrading road surface during the first pass—to break free, building up a twenty-second lead over Latvala at the end of the day, with Ott Tänak a further thirty seconds behind. Further down the order, Craig Breen struggled with snow drifts on his début in the C3 WRC; Juho Hänninen retired after damaging his radiator when he hit a tree; and Mads Østberg was forced out when the rear wing of his Fiesta WRC fell off. The second leg of the rally saw Neuville build his overnight lead to forty-three seconds, only crash out for the second event in a row. Tänak won every stage of the morning loop to put pressure on Latvala in second, closing to within five seconds when Latvala was forced to slow to avoid Kris Meeke as Meeke attempted to return to the stage after an off. Sébastien Ogier, running ahead of Meeke and therefore unimpeded, started to catch Tänak and was thirteen seconds behind the Estonian as the crews started the final stage of the day, a short super-special stage. Neuville hit a tire stack and broke his steering, forcing him out of the event and handing the provisional podium positions to Latvala, Tänak and Ogier; Neuville ultimately salvaged three points on the Power Stage. The third day started with Ogier spinning on the opening stage and losing ground to the leaders; meanwhile, Latvala won the opening stages to consolidate his lead over Tänak. Tänak was unable to respond on the Power Stage, handing Latvala his fourth victory in Sweden. Dani Sordo and Marc Martí finished fourth ahead of Breen and Scott Martin. Elfyn Evans and Daniel Barritt survived a late push from Hayden Paddon and John Kennard to secure sixth. Stéphane Lefebvre and Gabin Moreau finished eighth, having reverted to a year-old DS3 for the event. WRC-2 entrants Pontus Tidemand and Jonas Andersson finished ninth in a Škoda Fabia R5, while Teemu Suninen and Mikko Markkula completed the points-scoring positions in a Ford Fiesta R5.

=== Rally Mexico ===
Kris Meeke and Paul Nagle won the Rally of Mexico, marking the pair's first victory of the season, and the first for the Citroën C3 WRC. Sébastien Ogier led into Friday after two runs of the New Mexico City street stage, but an accident involving civilian vehicles lead to heavy traffic on the road to León and subsequently caused the first two special stages of Friday to be cancelled as the cars arrived late. Meeke won the first gravel stage as Hyundai, M-Sport and Toyota all suffered issues blamed on the heat and altitude of the Mexican stages. Despite a threat from Ogier and Neuville in third, Meeke maintained his lead through Saturday. A spin on a hairpin for Ogier stretched Meeke's lead to over thirty seconds by the end of the day. Stéphane Lefebvre and Lorenzo Bertelli crashed on Saturday, but both resumed on Sunday with only cosmetic damage. By Sunday morning, Ott Tänak was fourth, followed by Hayden Paddon, who reported technical issues. They would hold their positions until the end of the rally. Jari-Matti Latvala, plagued by engine issues and a poor road position on Friday, won a battle for sixth with his teammate Juho Hänninen who was suffering from illness. Further back, Elfyn Evans won three stages but had been issued a five-minute time penalty following an engine change before the first stage. Similarly, Dani Sordo had been given a ten-minute penalty for an incomplete performance at Saturday evening's super-special stage, but this was successfully appealed by his team, meaning he finished eighth. The power stage was won by Neuville, with Ogier, Tänak, Latvala and Sordo also scoring. In the final few corners of the power stage, Meeke lost control over a bump in a fast right turn, left the road and hit a spectator's parked car. After spending twenty seconds in a field doubling as a car park, he returned to the road, to win the rally with a margin of fourteen seconds. He moved to sixth in the championship standings, while Ogier took the lead from Latvala. Ogier's podium finish and championship lead were briefly threatened after his car failed scrutineering due to a technical infringement with his gearbox, but were subsequently upheld after closer examination of the car.

=== Tour de Corse ===
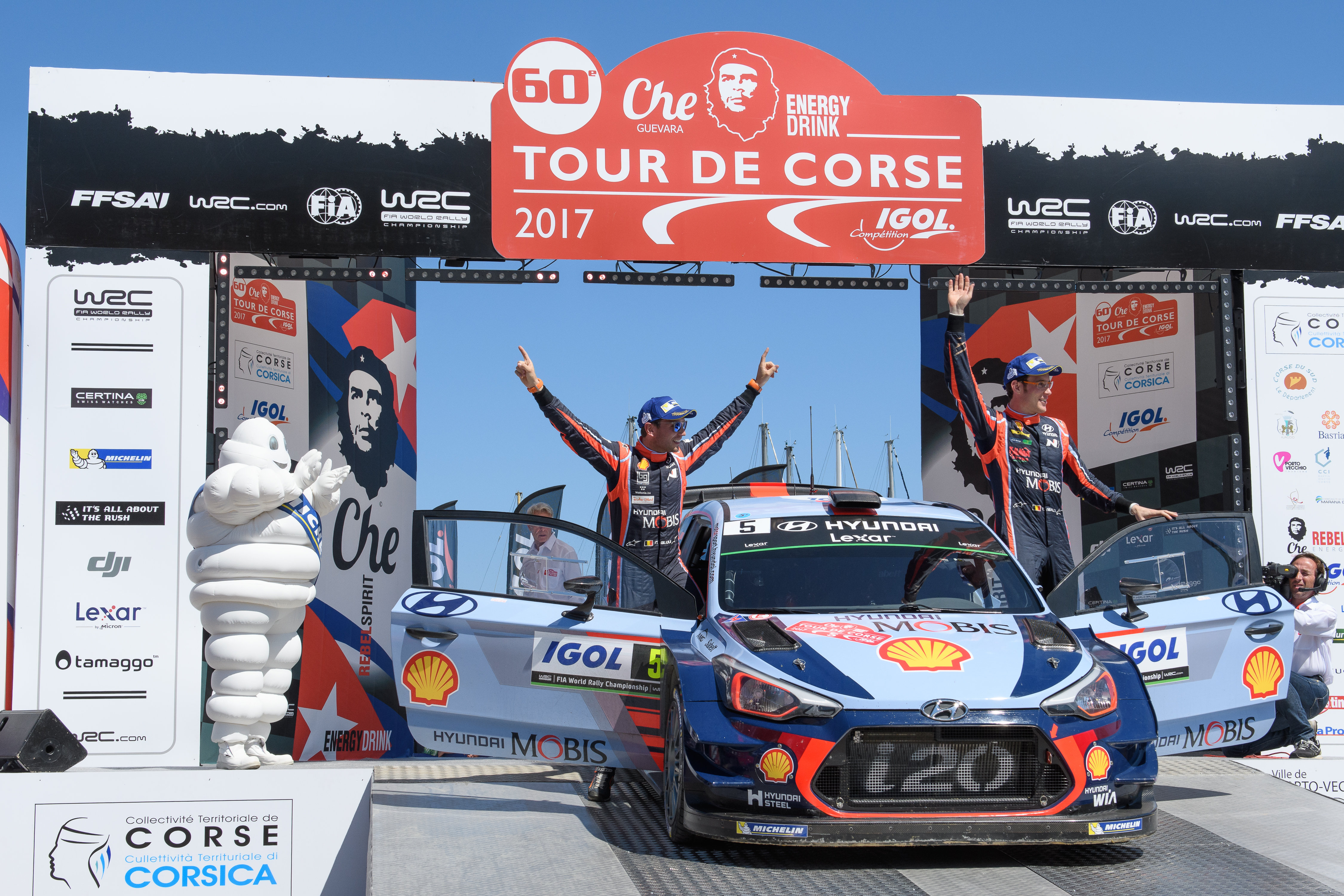
After retiring from the lead in Monte Carlo and Sweden, Thierry Neuville and Nicolas Gilsoul won their first event of the season in Corsica.

Thierry Neuville and Nicolas Gilsoul won the Tour de Corse, making Hyundai the fourth different manufacturer to win in as many rallies. Kris Meeke and Paul Nagle established themselves as the early leaders, with Sébastien Ogier and Julien Ingrassia emerged as their closest challengers as Ott Tänak and Martin Järveoja had an early off that they could not recover from. Neuville and Gilsoul made a slow start, but recovered well to take advantage of setup and hydraulics problems that stymied Ogier's progress, and by the end of the first day were in a position to challenge the reigning World Champions for second place. Meeke and Nagle continued to build their lead until their engine let go, forcing them to retire on the spot and handing the lead of the rally to Neuville and Gilsoul. With Ogier and Ingrassia struggling with an engine misfire, the Hyundai crew were able to establish a lead of over thirty seconds, and they remained unchallenged for the rest of the event. Dani Sordo and Marc Martí briefly held second place—despite struggling with setup problems and being unable to find a rhythm—before Ogier and Ingrassia reclaimed the position in the final stage. Jari-Matti Latvala and Miikka Anttila finished fourth, edging out Craig Breen and Scott Martin by a tenth of a second, while Hayden Paddon and John Kennard finished sixth. Seventh place was taken by WRC-2 entrants Andreas Mikkelsen and Anders Jæger, with the fellow WRC-2 crew of Teemu Suninen and Mikko Markkula eighth. Stéphane Sarrazin and Jacques-Julien Renucci finished ninth in an independent entry, with former French junior champions Yohan Rossel and Benoît Fulcrand completing the top ten. The result saw Ogier and Ingrassia extend their championship lead by five points, while Neuville and Gilsoul took third place in the drivers' and co-drivers' championships from Tänak and Järveoja. Neuville's win and Sordo's podium saw Hyundai pass Toyota for second place in the manufacturers' standings.

=== Rally Argentina ===
Thierry Neuville and Nicolas Gilsoul took their second consecutive victory in Rally Argentina to close within two points of Jari-Matti Latvala and Miikka Anttila in the drivers' and co-drivers' championships. The rough roads of Argentina quickly proved to be difficult for the crews. Sébastien Ogier and Julien Ingrassia slid wide into a ditch; Latvala and Miikka Anttila struggled with an overheating engine; Dani Sordo and Marc Martí broke a steering arm and lost eleven minutes repairing it after striking a rock; Hayden Paddon and John Kennard, and Kris Meeke and Paul Nagle both rolled; while Craig Breen and Scott Martin damaged their gearbox after hitting the same rock as Meeke. With the high rate of attrition, Elfyn Evans and Daniel Barritt emerged as the early leaders, attributing their success to the durability of the soft compound DMACK tyres compared to the soft compound Michelins used by the other crews. However, two punctures, a spin and the loss of the rear diffuser on the second day saw Neuville and Gilsoul cut Evans' and Barritt's lead from one minute to eleven seconds. Neuville continued to apply pressure during the final day, cutting the deficit to less than a second going into the final stage. Neuville forced an error from Evans who struck a bridge and lost a second and a half. Ott Tänak and Martin Järveoja finished third after a strategic drive to avoid damage, with Ogier and Ingrassia beating Latvala and Anttila to fourth. Paddon and Kennard recovered from their roll to finish sixth, while Juho Hänninen and Kaj Lindström finished seventh. Dani Sordo and Marc Martí successfully defended eighth from Mads Østberg and Ola Fløene, who had run as high as second before damaging their suspension. WRC2 points leaders Pontus Tidemand and Jonas Andersson completed the points-scoring positions in tenth.

=== Rally de Portugal ===
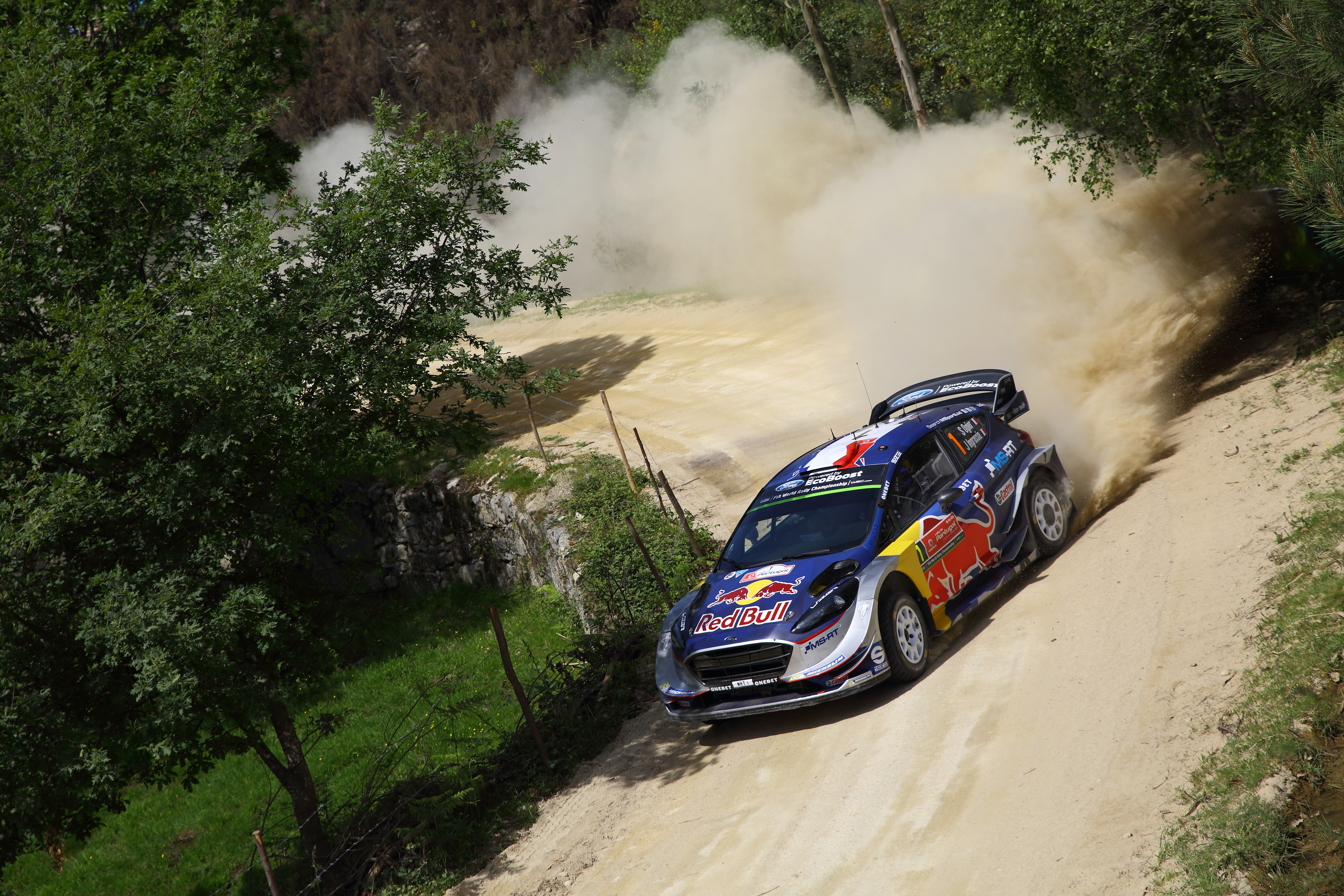
Sébastien Ogier and Julien Ingrassia won their second event of the season in Portugal.

Sébastien Ogier and Julien Ingrassia took their second victory of the season at the Rally of Portugal, matching Markku Alén and Ilkka Kivimäki's record of five wins in Portugal. Thierry Neuville and Nicolas Gilsoul finished second, scoring enough points to take second place from Jari-Matti Latvala and Miikka Anttila in the championship. The opening leg of the rally saw the lead change five times in seven stages, with Ott Tänak and Martin Järveoja emerging at the eventual leaders. Both Latvala and Anttila and Kris Meeke and Paul Nagle briefly held the lead before crashing out of contention; Latvala, battling a fever and back injury suffered a low-speed roll-over and was able to continue, while Meeke broke his suspension after sliding off the road and he retired from the leg. The second day saw the lead between Tänak and second-placed Ogier fluctuate until Tänak ran wide and damaged his car. Ogier inherited a twenty-second lead over Neuville and started pulling away until the Hyundai driver made set-up changes for the afternoon stages and started closing the deficit. However, Ogier was able to maintain his pace and went on to win by fifteen seconds. Dani Sordo and Marc Martí completed the podium in third, while Tänak and Järveoja recovered to fourth, picking up an extra five points for winning the Power Stage. Craig Breen and Scott Martin were the leading Citroën in fifth, having won a rally-long fight with Elfyn Evans and Daniel Barritt. Juho Hänninen and Kaj Lindstrom matched their best result of the season with seventh, having driven conservatively to account for their inexperience in Portugal. Mads Østberg and Ola Flœne finished eighth in a privateer Fiesta WRC, beating Latvala and Anttila, while in the third Toyota, Esapekka Lappi and Janne Ferm scored points on their début.

=== Rally Italia Sardegna ===
Ott Tänak and Martin Järveoja claimed their maiden World Rally Championship victory in Sardegna, finishing ahead of Jari-Matti Latvala and Miikka Anttila, with Thierry Neuville and Nicolas Gilsoul in third. The rally was run in difficult conditions, with high temperatures across the weekend while a lack of wind caused further problems as dust from the surface lingered in the forest stages, reducing visibility. Kris Meeke and Paul Nagle took the lead on the first day before suffering a roll-over—their fourth in three rallies—that damaged their rollcage and forced them into retirement. Hayden Paddon and Sebastian Marshall inherited the lead while further down the order Craig Breen and Scott Martin cracked their gearbox casing after landing heavily on a rock, Elfyn Evans and Daniel Barritt slid into a tree, and Dani Sordo and Marc Martí struggled with an intermittent turbo failure. Neuville and Gilsoul challenged for the lead until their brakes failed and they lost a minute to Paddon and Marshall. The lead changed again when Paddon and Marshall clipped and embankment and tore a suspension upright out of the car. Tänak and Järveoja inherited the lead themselves while Latvala and Anttila recovered from a slow start to be second at the end of the day. Both crews made errors throughout the final day, but Tänak and Järveoja held a twenty-eight second lead ahead of the power stage and held on to secure first place overall. Esapekka Lappi and Janne Ferm finished fourth and scored an extra five points for winning the power stage, while Sébastien Ogier and Julien Ingrassia were fifth. Juho Hänninen and Kaj Lindström matched their career-best result with sixth ahead of Mads Østberg and Øla Flœne, who damaged their suspension on the final stage. Andreas Mikkelsen and Anders Jæger scored points on début for Citroën. The points-scoring positions were completed by Eric Camilli and Benjamin Veillas in a Ford Fiesta R5 in ninth, and WRC2 class winners Jan Kopecký and Pavel Dressler.

=== Rally Poland ===
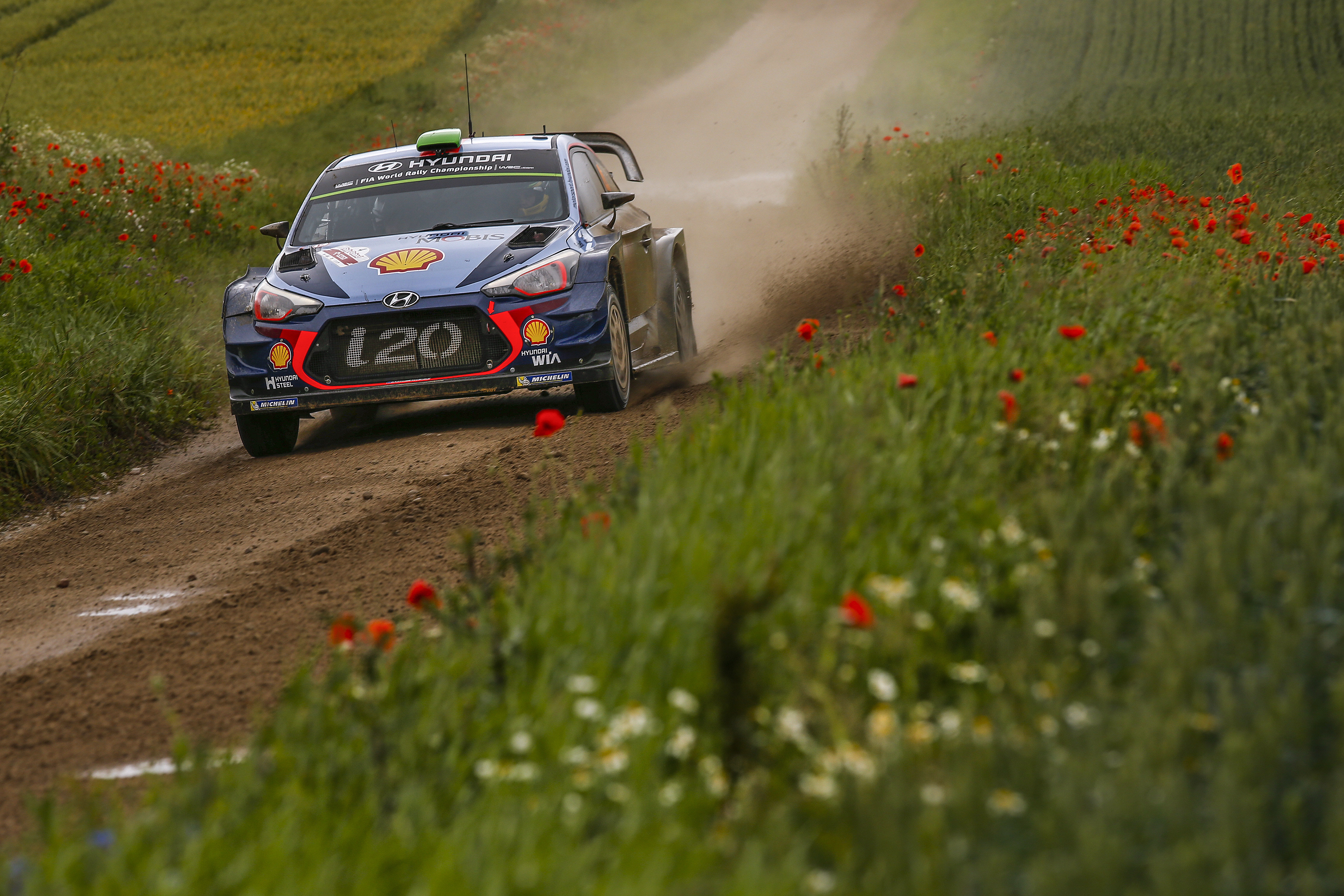
Hayden Paddon finished on the podium for the first time of the season in Poland. It was the first podium for his co-driver, Sebastian Marshall.

Thierry Neuville and Nicolas Gilsoul took their third win of the season in Poland to further close in on the championship lead. Hayden Paddon and Sebastian Marshall finished second in their best result of the season, with Sébastien Ogier and Julien Ingrassia completing the podium in third. Heavy rains in the region the week before the rally meant that the normally loose, sandy surface became very slippery, with deep ruts being carved into the surface for the second pass over the stages. The four crews leading the championship—Ogier and Ingrassia, Neuville and Gilsoul, Ott Tänak and Martin Järveoja, and Jari-Matti Latvala and Miika Anttila—set the early pace, with the lead changing hands several times on the first morning of competition. Ogier and Ingrassia struggled to stay with the leaders during the afternoon's running as their road position meant that they were the first to encounter the ruts, while Latvala and Anttila later retired with a terminal engine fault. Neuville and Gilsoul lead the rally at the end of the first day. Tänak and Järveoja reclaimed the lead on the second day, only to lose their rear wing late in the afternoon; however, Neuville and Gilsoul were unable to build on their newfound lead as they suffered a puncture shortly thereafter. Tänak and Järveoja pushed early on the final day and briefly took the lead again, but clipped a tree stump on the next stage that spun them into an embankment, crushing their intercooler and radiator. Their retirement handed the lead to Neuville and Gilsoul, who won the rally by over a minute. Dani Sordo and Marc Martí were fourth, putting all three Hyundais in the top four, while Stéphane Lefebvre and Gabin Moreau were fifth after missing the Rally of Italy. Partnered with Mikko Markkula, Teemu Suninen scored points on his World Rally Championship début in sixth. Mads Østberg and Ola Flœne were seventh ahead of Elfyn Evans and Daniel Barritt. Andreas Mikkelsen and Anders Jæger—substituting for Kris Meeke and Paul Nagle—were ninth in an upgraded C3 WRC, with Juho Hänninen and Kaj Lindström completing the points in tenth. Re-entering the event under Rally-2 regulations, Latvala and Anttila won the Power Stage to take third position in the drivers' and co-drivers' championships from Tänak and Järveoja.

=== Rally Finland ===
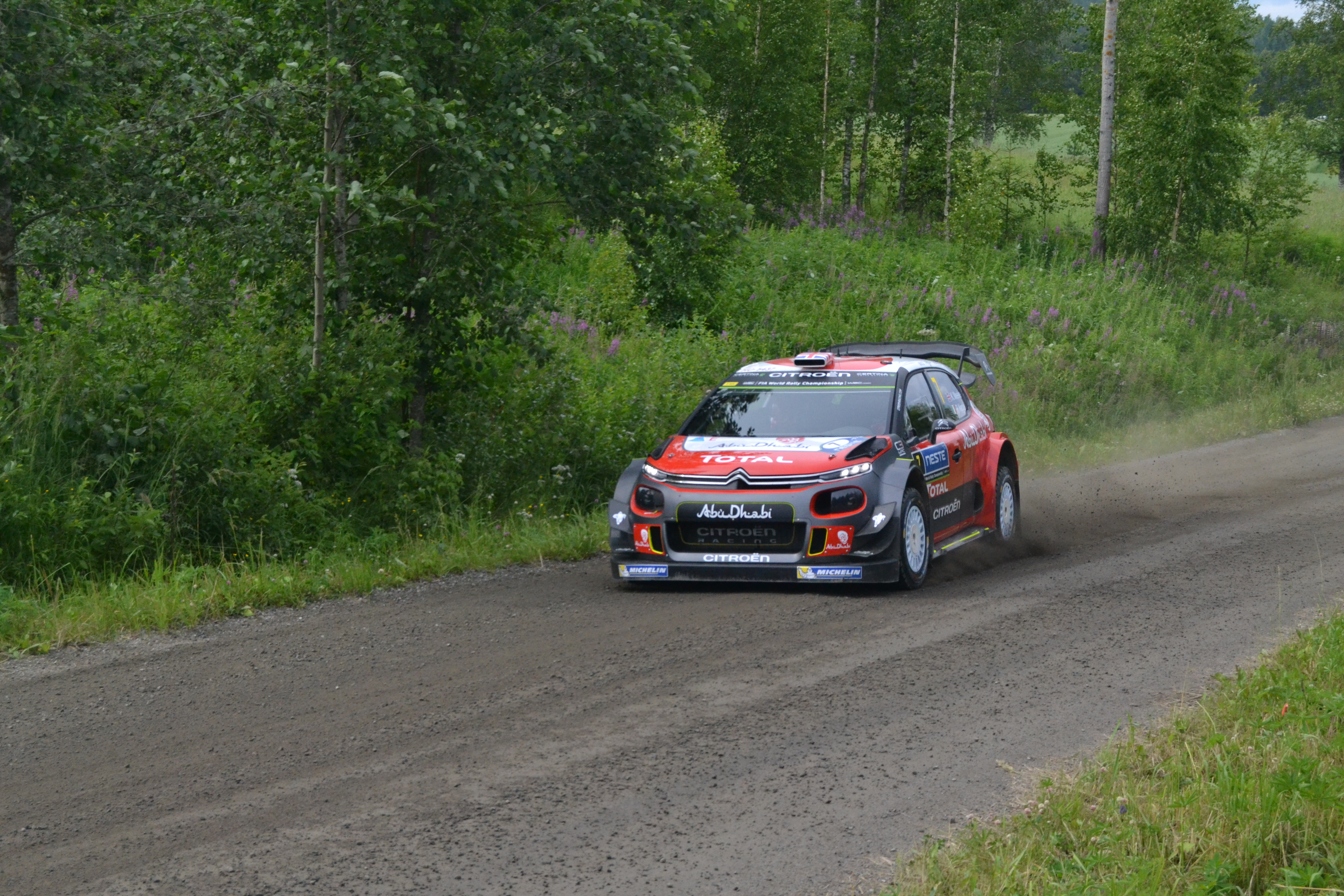
2016 Rally Finland winners Kris Meeke and Paul Nagle returned for the 2017 event having been dropped for the previous round in Poland.

Esapekka Lappi and Janne Ferm won Rally Finland in their fourth start in the sport's premier class. Elfyn Evans and Daniel Barritt finished second, claiming the position from Juho Hänninen and Kaj Lindström on the final stage. The rally saw a change in the championship lead as Thierry Neuville and Nicolas Gilsoul secured enough points to match Sébastien Ogier and Julien Ingrassia; having won three rallies compared to Ogier's two, Neuville was considered the championship leader. Ogier's rally came to an early end when he damaged his suspension after landing heavily off a jump. Distracted by the change in his car's handling, Ogier misheard a pace note and slid into a tree. Although M-Sport were able to repair the car to re-enter the rally, Ingrassia was diagnosed with a concussion and the team elected against continuing on medical advice. The battle for the rally lead was waged between the three Toyotas—the Yaris WRC having been extensively tested on the roads around Jyväskylä during its initial development phase—and the privately entered Fiesta of Teemu Suninen and Mikko Markkula. Finnish crews occupied the top four positions until an electrical fault paralysed Jari-Matti Latvala and Miikka Anttila's Toyota, forcing them to retire and handing a fifty-second lead to Lappi and Ferm. Suninen crashed on the final day and fell from second to fourth, while Craig Breen secured another fifth-place finish for Citroën. Neuville and Gilsoul were sixth after struggling with the undulating roads on the opening day. Ott Tänak and Martin Järveoja recovered to seventh after suffering a puncture on the opening day, finishing ahead of Kris Meeke and Paul Nagle, who finished eighth on their return to the sport. Dani Sordo and Marc Martí finished ninth, with Mads Østberg completing the points in tenth with new co-driver Torstein Eriksen.

=== Rallye Deutschland ===
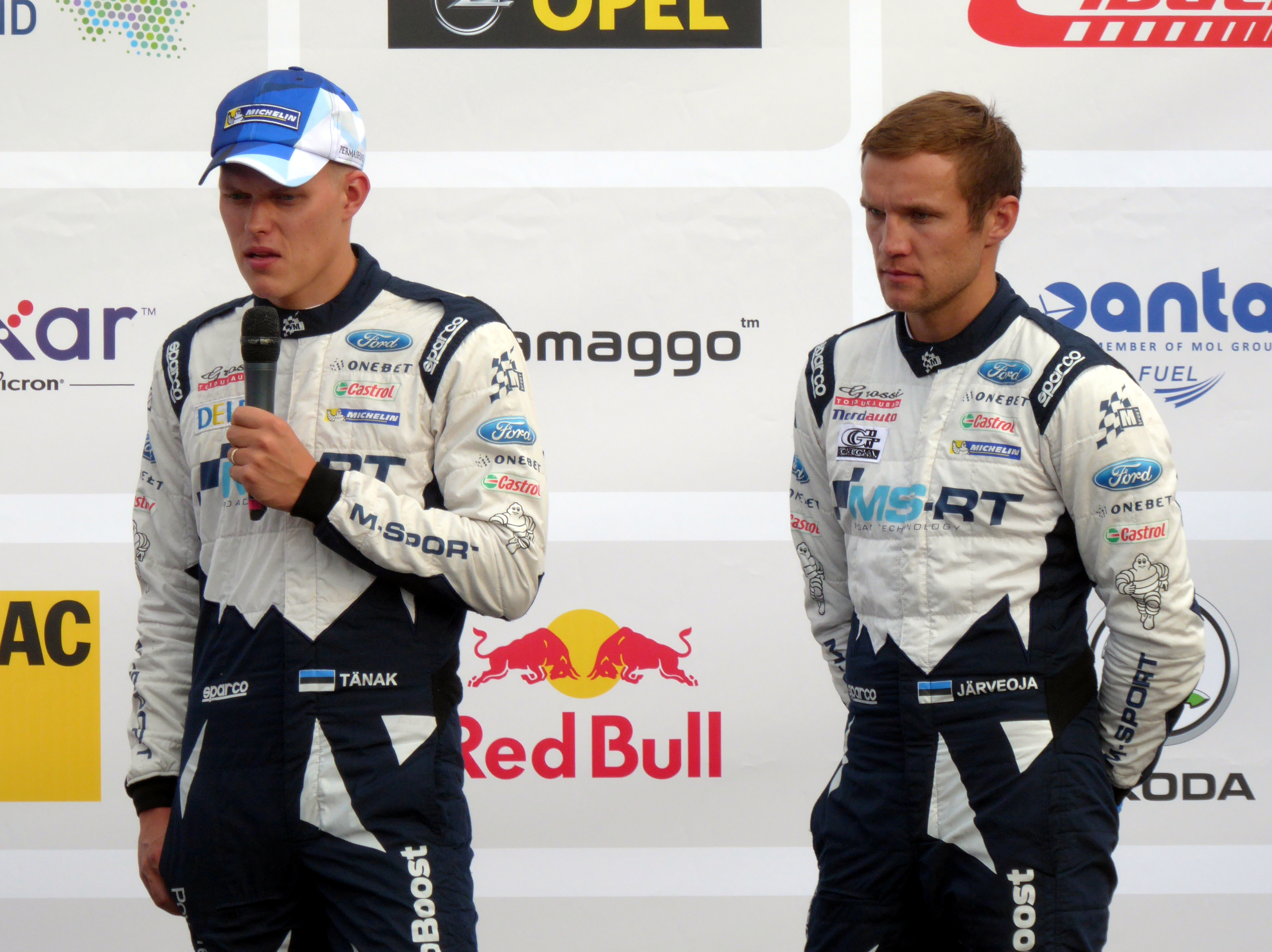
Ott Tänak and Martin Järveoja took their second win of the season.

Ott Tänak and Martin Järveoja took their second win of the season in Germany ahead of Andreas Mikkelsen and Anders Jæger. Sébastien Ogier and Julien Ingrassia reclaimed the championship lead in third as Thierry Neuville and Nicolas Gilsoul failed to score points when they retired with broken suspension. Tänak and Järveoja controlled the rally for most of the event by managing their tyres across the variety of surfaces that made up the route, benefiting from errors made by other drivers. In taking victory Tänak and Järveoja secured M-Sport's first win in Germany, which prior to the rally had been the only calendar event that M-Sport had not won. Juho Hänninen and Kaj Lindström were the highest-placed Toyota crew in fourth as Jari-Matti Latvala and Miikka Anttila struggled with mechanical issues and Esapekka Lappi and Janne Ferm retired after hitting a wall. Craig Breen and Scott Martin finished fifth, taking the place from Elfyn Evans and Daniel Barritt on the final stage. Latvala and Anttila recovered from their engine problems to finish seventh, while Hayden Paddon and Sebastian Marshall experienced several punctures on their way to eighth. Local privateers Armin Kremer and Pirmin Winklhofer finished ninth in a 2017-specification Fiesta WRC, and WRC-2 entrants Eric Camilli and Benjamin Veillas completed the points in tenth. Pre-event favourites Dani Sordo and Marc Martí crashed out on the opening day, but re-entered under Rally-2 regulations and went on to score five points for winning the Power Stage. Kris Meeke and Paul Nagle retired on the first stage after Meeke misjudged a corner and hit a barricade the broke his steering arm.

=== Rally Catalunya ===
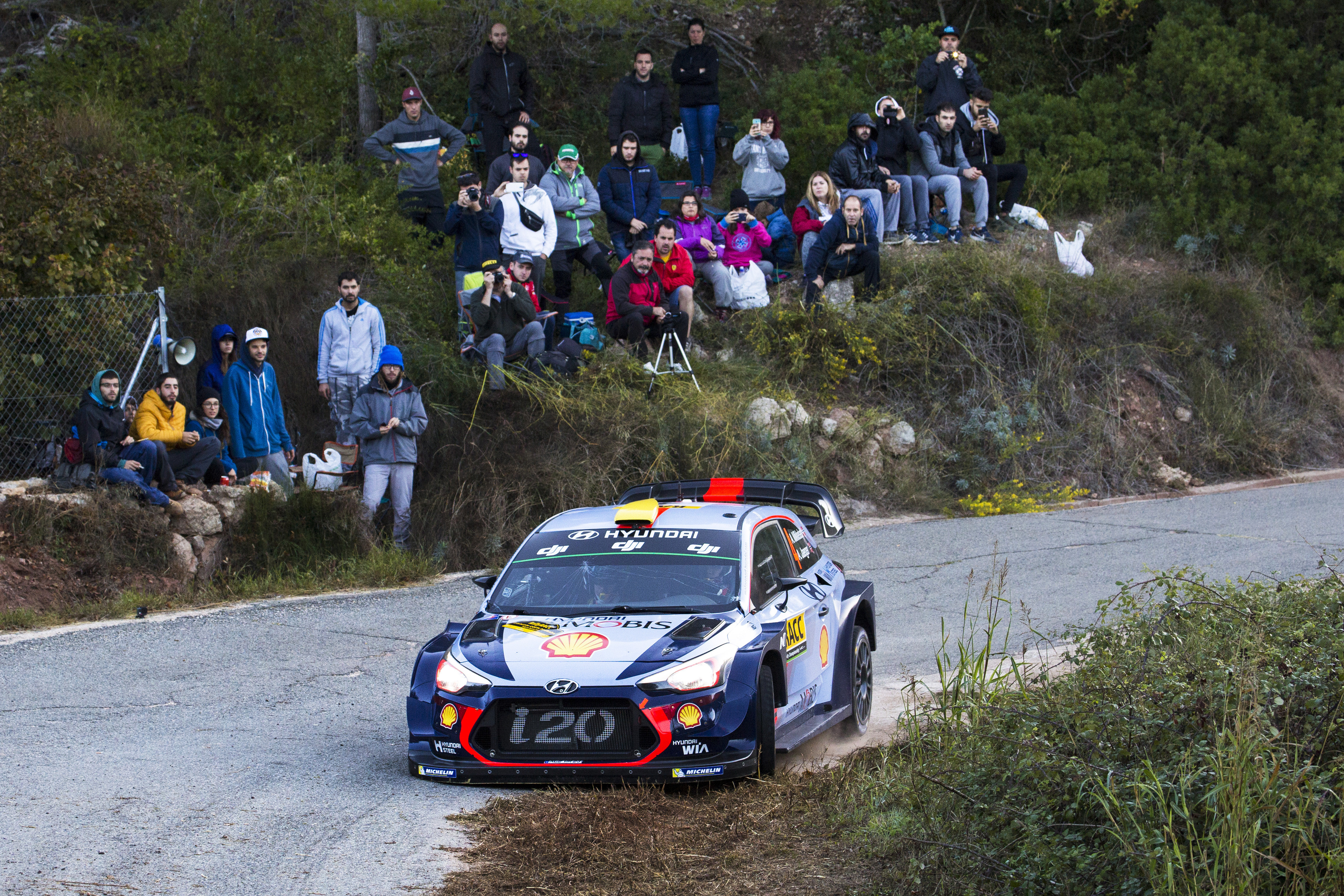
Andreas Mikkelsen and Anders Jæger joined Hyundai Motorsport for the 2017 Rally Catalunya.

Kris Meeke and Paul Nagle took the first tarmac win of their career in Catalunya, while Sébastien Ogier and Julien Ingrassia extended their championship lead. Ott Tänak and Martin Järveoja finished third, passing Thierry Neuville and Nicolas Gilsoul in the championship standings after Neuville and Gilsoul retired with damaged suspension.

Andreas Mikkelsen and Anders Jæger took an early lead on début for Hyundai, but fell behind during the tarmac stages. Mikkelsen acknowledged that his lack of experience with the i20 Coupe WRC on tarmac limited his ability to get the most out of it. They retired and re-entered under Rally 2 regulations when they struck a culvert and damages their suspension, as did Dani Sordo and Marc Martí in the sister Hyundai. Meeke and Nagle assumed the lead as Ogier and Ingrassia became embroiled in a fight with Tänak and Järveoja, who were forced to use a gravel-specification gearbox on tarmac when their tarmac gearbox failed. Juho Hänninen and Kaj Lindström finished fourth, the only Toyota to complete the event after Esapekka Lappi and Janne Ferm crashed out, and Jari-Matti Latvala and Mikka Anttila retired with an electrical fault. Mads Østberg and Torstein Eriksen finished fifth, with Østberg attributing the result to the 2017 generation of cars, which he found easier to drive on tarmac. Stéphane Lefebvre and Gabin Moreau finished sixth on their return to competition, ahead of Elfyn Evans and Daniel Barritt, who struggled with a lack of grip on tarmac. World Rally Championship entrants Teemu Suninen and Mikko Markkula finished eighth, with Jan Kopecký and Pavel Dressler in ninth and Ole Christian Veiby and Stig Rune Skjærmoen completing the points in tenth.

=== Wales Rally GB ===
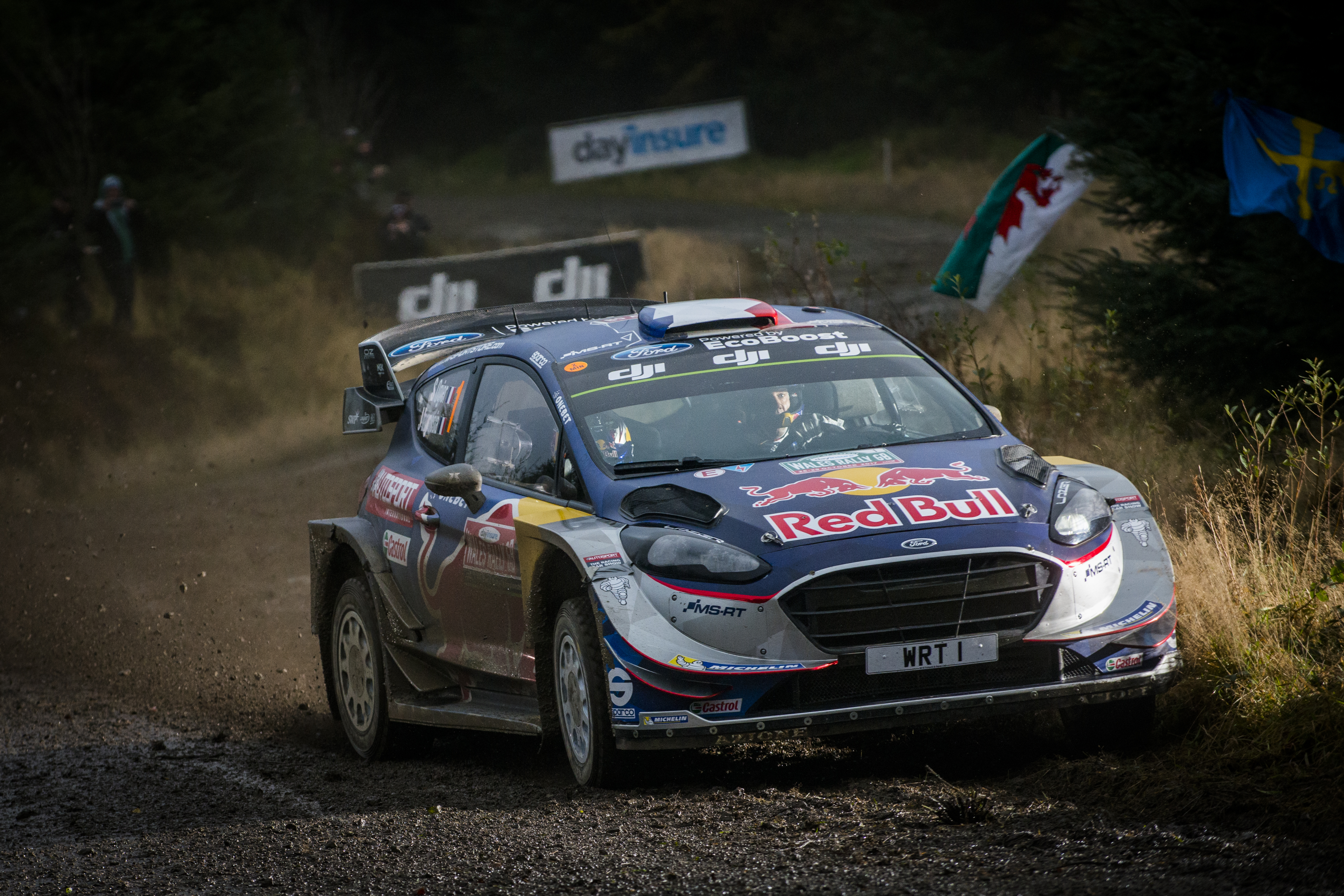
Ogier and Ingrassia secured the drivers' and co-drivers' titles in Wales.

Elfyn Evans and Daniel Barritt became the seventh different crew to win a rally in 2017 when they won the Wales Rally GB. The event saw Ogier and Ingrassia secure their fifth consecutive World Championship titles, becoming the first Ford crew to win the World Championship since Ari Vatanen and David Richards in 1981. (Note: The FIA officially recognise M-Sport as the manufacturer entering Ogier and Ingrassia's car as Ford do not officially support the team; however, the FIA do recognise the car as a Ford Fiesta WRC.)

Thierry Neuville and Nicolas Gilsoul finished the rally second overall despite incurring an early penalty and sliding into a ditch on the opening day. Ogier and Ingrassia finished third after nursing a puncture and broken brake disc during the foggy night stages, while a late push from Andreas Mikkelsen and Anders Jæger was enough to secure fourth position. Jari-Matti Latvala and Miikka Anttila were fifth, having struggled to match the leaders' pace early in the rally until the night stages where successive stage wins saw them climb several places in the overall standings. Conversely, Ott Tänak and Martin Järveoja ran as high as second through the opening legs, but struggled with low visibility in the fog and slipped to sixth. Kris Meeke and Paul Nagle struggled with a lack of pace after making several unforced errors to finish seventh ahead of Hayden Paddon and Sebastian Marshall. Esapekka Lappi and Janne Ferm finished ninth while Dani Sordo and Marc Martí completed the points in tenth position.

=== Rally Australia ===
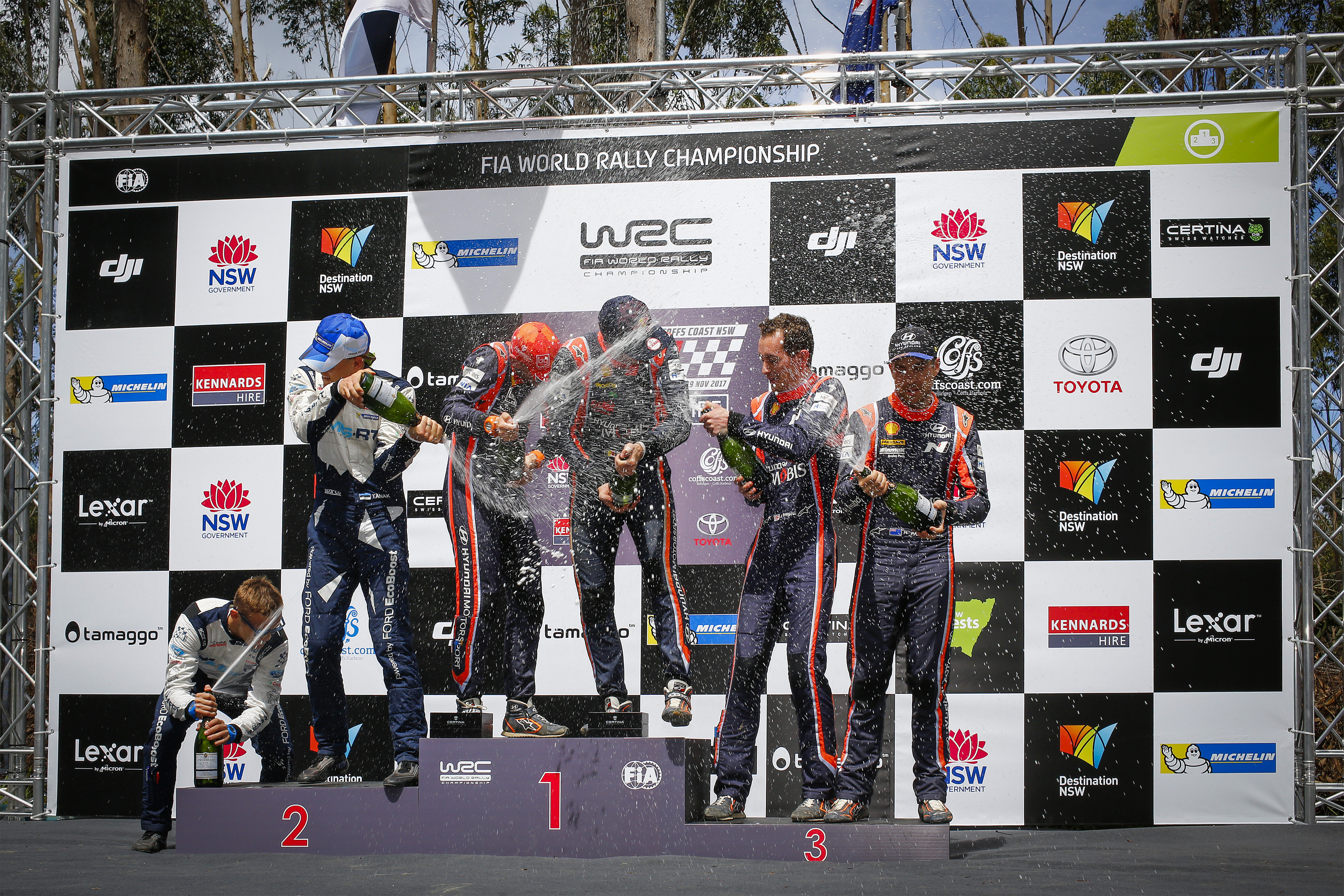
Rally Australia podium

Thierry Neuville and Nicolas Gilsoul claimed their fourth win of the year in Australia, with the result securing second place in the championship. Ott Tänak and Martin Järveoja were second, while Hayden Paddon and Sebastian Marshall finished in third—their first podium finish of the season—when Jari-Matti Latvala and Miikka Anttilla crashed out on the final stage.

The rally saw variable conditions across the three days of competition, ranging from dry heat to humidity and heavy rain. Andreas Mikkelsen and Anders Jæger established an early lead as the front-runners were forced to sweep the loose, heavy gravel from the road surface. They maintained their pace into the second day until they struck an embankment and punctured two tyres, but with only one spare they were not permitted to start the next stage. Neuville and Gilsoul climbed from fourth place to the lead as others suffered their own misfortunes; Craig Breen and Scott Martin damaged a wheel, while Kris Meeke and Paul Nagle damaged their rear suspension on a bridge. Citroën elected to retire the car, concerned that the suspension would fail completely on an upcoming stage, only for the stage to be cancelled. Sitting in second, Latvala and Anttilla began catching Neuville and Gilsoul in the dry, but fell back in the wet before crashing out. Sébastien Ogier and Julien Ingrassia finished fourth and won the Power Stage for an additional five championship points. Elfyn Evans and Daniel Barritt were fifth ahead of Esapekka Lappi and Janne Ferm, who lost time on the first day with a power steering failure. Having re-entered under Rally-2 regulations, Meeke and Nagle took advantage of attrition on the final day—that saw the sister Citroëns of Breen and Martin and Stéphane Lefebvre and Gabin Moreau retire—to finish seventh ahead of local privateers Nathan Quinn and John Allen. Jourdan Serderidis and Frédéric Miclotte finished eleventh overall, but were classified ninth in the points standings as the crew the finished ninth were ineligible to score points. Similarly, Kalle Rovanperä and Jonne Halttunen finished in twelfth but were classified in tenth.

== Results and standings ==
=== Season summary ===
Round	Event	Winning driver	Winning co-driver	Winning entrant	Winning time	Report
1	(Monaco) Monte Carlo Rally	(France) Sébastien Ogier	(France) Julien Ingrassia	(United Kingdom) M-Sport World Rally Team	4:00:03.6	Report
2	Rally Sweden	(Finland) Jari-Matti Latvala	(Finland) Miikka Anttila	(Japan) Toyota Gazoo Racing WRT	2:36:03.6	Report
3	Rally Mexico	(United Kingdom) Kris Meeke	(Republic of Ireland) Paul Nagle	(France) Citroën Total Abu Dhabi WRT	3:22:04.6	Report
4	(France) Tour de Corse	(Belgium) Thierry Neuville	(Belgium) Nicolas Gilsoul	(South Korea) Hyundai Motorsport	3:22:53.4	Report
5	Rally Argentina	(Belgium) Thierry Neuville	(Belgium) Nicolas Gilsoul	(South Korea) Hyundai Motorsport	3:38:10.6	Report
6	Rally Portugal	(France) Sébastien Ogier	(France) Julien Ingrassia	(United Kingdom) M-Sport World Rally Team	3:42:55.7	Report
7	(Italy) Rally Italia Sardegna	(Estonia) Ott Tänak	(Estonia) Martin Järveoja	(United Kingdom) M-Sport World Rally Team	3:25:15.1	Report
8	Rally Poland	(Belgium) Thierry Neuville	(Belgium) Nicolas Gilsoul	(South Korea) Hyundai Motorsport	2:40:46.1	Report
9	Rally Finland	(Finland) Esapekka Lappi	(Finland) Janne Ferm	(Japan) Toyota Gazoo Racing WRT	2:29:26.9	Report
10	(Germany) Rallye Deutschland	(Estonia) Ott Tänak	(Estonia) Martin Järveoja	(United Kingdom) M-Sport World Rally Team	2:57:31.7	Report
11	(Spain) Rally Catalunya	(United Kingdom) Kris Meeke	(Republic of Ireland) Paul Nagle	(France) Citroën Total Abu Dhabi WRT	3:01:21.1	Report
12	(United Kingdom) Wales Rally GB	(United Kingdom) Elfyn Evans	(United Kingdom) Daniel Barritt	(United Kingdom) M-Sport World Rally Team	2:57:00.6	Report
13	Rally Australia	(Belgium) Thierry Neuville	(Belgium) Nicolas Gilsoul	(South Korea) Hyundai Motorsport	2:35:44.8	Report

=== Scoring system ===
Points are awarded to the top ten classified finishers. In the manufacturers' championship, points are only awarded to the top two classified finishers representing a manufacturer and driving a 2017-specification World Rally Car. There are also five bonus points awarded to the winners of the Power Stage, four points for second place, three for third, two for fourth and one for fifth. Power Stage points are only awarded in the drivers' and co-drivers' championships.

Position	1st	2nd	3rd	4th	5th	6th	7th	8th	9th	10th
Points	25	18	15	12	10	8	6	4	2	1

=== FIA World Rally Championship for Drivers ===
Pos.	Driver	MON (Monaco)	SWE (Sweden)	MEX (Mexico)	FRA (France)	ARG (Argentina)	POR (Portugal)	ITA (Italy)	POL (Poland)	FIN (Finland)	DEU (Germany)	CAT (Spain)	GBR (United Kingdom)	AUS (Australia)	Points
1	(France) Sébastien Ogier	1	3^{2}	2^{2}	2^{2}	4^{4}	1^{5}	5^{3}	3^{2}	Ret	3^{4}	2^{3}	3^{4}	4^{1}	232
2	(Belgium) Thierry Neuville	15^{1}	13^{3}	3^{1}	1^{5}	1^{1}	2^{2}	3^{4}	1^{5}	6^{3}	44	Ret	2^{1}	1	208
3	(Estonia) Ott Tänak	3	2	4^{3}	11	3^{3}	4^{1}	1	Ret	7^{1}	1	3^{4}	6	2^{2}	191
4	(Finland) Jari-Matti Latvala	2	1^{1}	6^{4}	4^{1}	5^{5}	9	2^{5}	20^{1}	21^{4}	7^{3}	Ret	5^{3}	Ret	136
5	(United Kingdom) Elfyn Evans	6^{4}	6	9	21	2^{2}	6^{3}	Ret	8	2^{2}	6	7	1	5	128
6	(Spain) Dani Sordo	4^{5}	4	8^{5}	3^{4}	8	3	12^{2}	4	9	34^{1}	15^{1}	10		95
7	(United Kingdom) Kris Meeke	Ret	12^{4}	1	Ret	Ret	18	Ret		8	Ret	1^{2}	7^{2}	7^{5}	77
8	(New Zealand) Hayden Paddon	Ret	7^{5}	5	6	6	Ret	Ret	2	Ret	8		8	3	74
9	(Finland) Juho Hänninen	16^{3}	23	7	Ret	7	7	6	10	3^{5}	4	4^{5}	Ret		71
10	(Republic of Ireland) Craig Breen	5	5		5^{3}	Ret	5	25	11	5	5^{5}		15	Ret	64
11	(Finland) Esapekka Lappi						10^{4}	4^{1}	Ret	1	21^{2}	Ret	9	6^{3}	62
12	(Norway) Andreas Mikkelsen	7			7		Ret	8	9^{3}		2	18	4^{5}	11^{4}	54
13	(France) Stéphane Lefebvre	9^{2}	8	15	50		13		5^{4}			6		Ret	30
14	(Finland) Teemu Suninen		10		8		12		6	4	16	8	31		29
15	(Norway) Mads Østberg		15			9	8	7	7	10	WD	5	38		29
16	(Czech Republic) Jan Kopecký	8			16			10			11	9			7
17	(Sweden) Pontus Tidemand	11	9	10		10	11		13		12		11		4
18	(Republic of Ireland) Richie Dalton													8	4
19	(France) Eric Camilli	12	14	11	28		21	9	14	12	10	16	12		3
20	(Greece) Jourdan Serderidis (Note: Crews were credited with World Championship points in Australia despite finishing outside the points-paying positions as the crews that finished in those positions were ineligible to score points.)	29							30		25	33	42	9	2
21	(France) Stéphane Sarrazin				9										2
22	(Germany) Armin Kremer	Ret									9				2
23	(Norway) Ole Christian Veiby		11		14			11	12	Ret		10	37		1
24	(France) Yohan Rossel				10		38	15			41	WD			1
25	(Finland) Kalle Rovanperä												35	10	1
26	(France) Bryan Bouffier	10			Ret										1
Pos.	Driver	MON (Monaco)	SWE (Sweden)	MEX (Mexico)	FRA (France)	ARG (Argentina)	POR (Portugal)	ITA (Italy)	POL (Poland)	FIN (Finland)	DEU (Germany)	CAT (Spain)	GBR (United Kingdom)	AUS (Australia)	Points

Key
Colour	Result
Gold	Winner
Silver	2nd place
Bronze	3rd place
Green	Points finish
Blue	Non-points finish
Blue	Non-classified finish (NC)
Purple	Did not finish (Ret)
Black	Excluded (EX)
Black	Disqualified (DSQ)
White	Did not start (DNS)
White	Cancelled (C)
Blank	Withdrew entry from the event (WD)

Notes:
^{1 2 3 4 5} – Power Stage position

=== FIA World Rally Championship for Co-Drivers ===
Pos.	Co-Driver	MON (Monaco)	SWE (Sweden)	MEX (Mexico)	FRA (France)	ARG (Argentina)	POR (Portugal)	ITA (Italy)	POL (Poland)	FIN (Finland)	DEU (Germany)	CAT (Spain)	GBR (United Kingdom)	AUS (Australia)	Points
1	(France) Julien Ingrassia	1	3^{2}	2^{2}	2^{2}	4^{4}	1^{5}	5^{3}	3^{2}	Ret	3^{4}	2^{3}	3^{4}	4^{1}	232
2	(Belgium) Nicolas Gilsoul	15^{1}	13^{3}	3^{1}	1^{5}	1^{1}	2^{2}	3^{4}	1^{5}	6^{3}	44	Ret	2^{1}	1	208
3	(Estonia) Martin Järveoja	3	2	4^{3}	11	3^{3}	4^{1}	1	Ret	7^{1}	1	3^{4}	6	2^{2}	191
4	(Finland) Miikka Anttila	2	1^{1}	6^{4}	4^{1}	5^{5}	9	2^{5}	20^{1}	21^{4}	7^{3}	Ret	5^{3}	Ret	136
5	(United Kingdom) Daniel Barritt	6^{4}	6	9	21	2^{2}	6^{3}	Ret	8	2^{2}	6	7	1	5	128
6	(Spain) Marc Martí	4^{5}	4	8^{5}	3^{4}	8	3	12^{2}	4	9	34^{1}	15^{1}	10		95
7	(Republic of Ireland) Paul Nagle	Ret	12^{4}	1	Ret	Ret	18	Ret		8	Ret	1^{2}	7^{2}	7^{5}	77
8	(Finland) Kaj Lindström	16^{3}	23	7	Ret	7	7	6	10	3^{5}	4	4^{5}	Ret		71
9	(United Kingdom) Scott Martin	5	5		5^{3}	Ret	5	25	11	5	5^{5}		15	Ret	64
10	(Finland) Janne Ferm						10^{4}	4^{1}	Ret	1	21^{2}	Ret	9	6^{3}	62
11	(Norway) Anders Jæger	7			7		Ret	8	9^{3}		2	18	4^{5}	11^{4}	54
12	(United Kingdom) Sebastian Marshall	31					Ret	Ret	2	Ret	8		8	3	41
13	(New Zealand) John Kennard	WD	7^{5}	5	6	6									33
14	(France) Gabin Moreau	9^{2}	8	15	50		13		5^{4}			6		Ret	30
15	(Finland) Mikko Markkula		10		8		12		6	4	16	8	31		29
16	(Norway) Ola Fløene		15			9	8	7	7		19		Ret		18
17	(Norway) Torstein Eriksen									10		5			11
18	(Czech Republic) Pavel Dresler	8			16			10			11	9			7
19	(Sweden) Jonas Andersson	11	9	10		10	11		13		12		11		4
20	(Australia) John Allen													8	4
21	(France) Benjamin Veillas	12	14	11	28		21	9	14	12	10	16	12		3
22	(France) Jacques-Julien Renucci				9		33			17		Ret	WD		2
23	(Belgium) Frédéric Miclotte	29									25	33	42	9	2
24	(Germany) Pirmin Winklhofer	Ret									9				2
25	(Norway) Stig Rune Skjærmoen		11		14			11	12	Ret		10	37		1
26	(France) Benoît Fulcrand				10		38	15			41	WD			1
27	(Finland) Jonne Halttunen									13			35	10	1
28	(France) Denis Giraudet	10			Ret										1
Pos.	Co-Driver	MON (Monaco)	SWE (Sweden)	MEX (Mexico)	FRA (France)	ARG (Argentina)	POR (Portugal)	ITA (Italy)	POL (Poland)	FIN (Finland)	DEU (Germany)	CAT (Spain)	GBR (United Kingdom)	AUS (Australia)	Points

Key
Colour	Result
Gold	Winner
Silver	2nd place
Bronze	3rd place
Green	Points finish
Blue	Non-points finish
Blue	Non-classified finish (NC)
Purple	Did not finish (Ret)
Black	Excluded (EX)
Black	Disqualified (DSQ)
White	Did not start (DNS)
White	Cancelled (C)
Blank	Withdrew entry from the event (WD)

Notes:
^{1 2 3 4 5} – Power Stage position

=== FIA World Rally Championship for Manufacturers ===
Pos.	Team	No.	MON (Monaco)	SWE (Sweden)	MEX (Mexico)	FRA (France)	ARG (Argentina)	POR (Portugal)	ITA (Italy)	POL (Poland)	FIN (Finland)	GER (Germany)	CAT (Spain)	GBR (United Kingdom)	AUS (Australia)	Points
1	(United Kingdom) M-Sport World Rally Team	1	1	3	2	2	NC	1	5	3	Ret	3	2	3	4	428
1	(United Kingdom) M-Sport World Rally Team	2	3	2	4	6	3	4	1	Ret	6	1	3	NC	2	428
1	(United Kingdom) M-Sport World Rally Team	3	NC	NC	NC	NC	2	NC	Ret	5	2	NC	NC	1	NC	428
2	(South Korea) Hyundai Motorsport	4	WD	6	5	NC	5	Ret	Ret	2	Ret	7	7	NC	3	345
2	(South Korea) Hyundai Motorsport	5	6	NC	3	1	1	2	3	1	5	NC	Ret	2	1	345
2	(South Korea) Hyundai Motorsport	6	4	4	NC	3	NC	3	7	NC	8	8	6	4	NC	345
3	(Japan) Toyota Gazoo Racing WRT	10	2	1	6	4	4	7	2	8	NC	6	Ret	5	Ret	251
3	(Japan) Toyota Gazoo Racing WRT	11	7	8	7	Ret	6	6	NC	7	3	4	4	Ret	5	251
3	(Japan) Toyota Gazoo Racing WRT	12						NC	4	Ret	1	NC	Ret	7		251
4	(France) Citroën Total Abu Dhabi WRT	7	Ret	7	1	Ret	Ret	NC	Ret	6	7	Ret	1	NC	Ret	218
4	(France) Citroën Total Abu Dhabi WRT	8	5	5	8	5	Ret	5	8	NC	NC	5	5	8	Ret	218
4	(France) Citroën Total Abu Dhabi WRT	9				7		8	6	4	4	2	NC	6	6	218
Pos.	Team	No.	MON (Monaco)	SWE (Sweden)	MEX (Mexico)	FRA (France)	ARG (Argentina)	POR (Portugal)	ITA (Italy)	POL (Poland)	FIN (Finland)	DEU (Germany)	CAT (Spain)	GBR (United Kingdom)	AUS (Australia)	Points

Key
Colour	Result
Gold	Winner
Silver	2nd place
Bronze	3rd place
Green	Points finish
Blue	Non-points finish
Blue	Non-classified finish (NC)
Purple	Did not finish (Ret)
Black	Excluded (EX)
Black	Disqualified (DSQ)
White	Did not start (DNS)
White	Cancelled (C)
Blank	Withdrew entry from the event (WD)
