= Faisal bin Sultan Al Qassimi =

United Arab Emirates politician and businessman

His Highness Sheikh Faisal bin Sultan Al Qassimi
- Born: Ras al-Khaimah, Trucial States (now United Arab Emirates)
- Occupation: Businessman
- Spouse: Sheikha Moza bint Hilal Al Nahyan
- Father: Sheikh Sultan bin Salem
- House: Al Qasimi

Chairman of the Arab Organization for Industrialization (AOI)
- In office 1978–1979
- Preceded by: Ashraf Marwan
- Succeeded by: Ahmad Zendo

Chief of staff of the Abu Dhabi Defence Force (ADDF)
- In office 1973–1974

Under Secretary of the Ministry of Defence
- In office 1971–1972

Chairman of the Court of Crown Prince at the time – Sheikh Khalifa Bin Zayed Al Nahyan
- In office 1969–1971

Military service
- Allegiance: UAE
- Branch/service: UAE armed forces, specifically UAE infantry
- Years of service: 1954–1975
- Rank: Major General

Sheikh Faisal bin Sultan Al Qassimi (Arabic: الشيخ فيصل بن سلطان بن سالم القاسمي) is a member of the royal house of Al Qasimi who rule the Emirates of Sharjah and Ras Al Khaimah. He was the first Under Secretary of the Ministry of Defence and chief of staff in Abu Dhabi. Today, Sheikh Faisal is a chairman of the board of directors of a number of private companies including Faisal Holding LLC, GIBCA, Grand Stores, Hospitality Management Holdings LLC, and United Arab Bank. He has several companies and affiliates in key industrial sectors such as real estate, hospitality, tourism, trading, marketing, energy and resources, security printing and private equity.

== Early life and education ==
Sheikh Faisal is the son of Sultan bin Salim Al Qasimi (ruler of Ras Al Khaimah from 19 July 1921 to February 1948) and grandson of Salim bin Sultan Al Qasimi (who ruled both Ras Al Khaimah, from 14 April 1868 to 1869, and Sharjah, from 14 April 1868 to March 1883).

Sheikh Faisal started his education in Ras Al Khaimah's Al Katateb School, and then went to Al Ahmadiya School of Dubai and Al Qassimia School of Sharjah. In 1954, Sheikh Faisal joined the Trucial Oman Scouts (TOS), and graduated in 1956 from the Officer Cadet School of Jordan. After graduating, he returned and served as a Lieutenant in the TOS for four years.

In 1960, he joined the Mons Officer Cadet School in Aldershot, where he excelled and was promoted to Queen's Commission Officer. Following his education at Mons Officer Cadet School, he returned to the Trucial States to serve once again as a Lieutenant in the TOS. During 1962, Sheikh Faisal continued his training and education at the Army School of Education at Wilton Park in Beaconsfield. After completing his courses, he attended the Small Arms School Corps at Hythe that same year. He finished his training at the School of Infantry in Warminster.

== Military career ==
In 1969, Sheikh Faisal left the TOS to join Sheikh Zayed bin Sultan Al Nahyan, then-ruler of Abu Dhabi. He was appointed the Chairman of the Ruler's Representative in the Eastern Region's diwan and Chief of the Court. Sheikh Zayed's representative in the Eastern region was his son Sheikh Khalifa bin Zayed, former president of the UAE. Sheikh Faisal moved to Abu Dhabi with Sheikh Khalifa after the latter was declared as Crown Prince and Deputy Supreme Commander of the Armed Forces. After their arrival to Abu Dhabi in 1971, Sheikh Faisal was appointed the Under Secretary of the Ministry of Defence. A year later, he was appointed the Chief of staff of the Abu Dhabi Defence Force (ADDF). He served briefly as the Chairman of the Arab Organization for Industrialization (AOI) during 1973-1974 after Ashraf Marwan; hence, making him the first non-Egyptian to head the organization.

== Decorations and medals ==
As an influential figure, Sheikh Faisal was decorated with several medals. He received the following orders and decorations during his career.

=== National honors ===
- UAE: 1st Class Emirates Military Medal by former UAE president Sheikh Zayed bin Sultan Al Nahyan (2.12.1989)

=== Foreign honors ===
- Jordan: Jordanian Star 1st Class by the late King Hussein (10.6.1974)
- Egypt: 1st Class Medal of Merit by the former President of Egypt, Anwar Sadat (31 May 1972)
- Morocco: Superior Order Staff General by the former King of Morocco, King Hassan II (12.8.1974)
- Sudan: Order of the Two Niles by former President of Sudan, Gaafar Nimeiry (25 May 1974)
