= 2018 in rallycross =

The following are the rallycross events and series of the year 2018 throughout the world.

The following are the rallycross series which took place in 2018 throughout the world. Championship standings for Supercar class series at national and subregional level are displayed in this article.

== Worldwide Series ==
Series	Organiser	Duration	(gold) Champion	(silver) Second place	(bronze) Third place
2018 FIA World Rallycross Championship	(France) Fédération Internationale de l'Automobile	14 April–25 November	(Sweden) Johan Kristoffersson	(Sweden) Mattias Ekström	(Norway) Andreas Bakkerud
2018 RX2 International Series	(France) Fédération Internationale de l'Automobile	12 May–25 November	(Sweden) Oliver Eriksson	(Belgium) Guillaume De Ridder	(Norway) Henrik Krogstad
2018 Nitro Rallycross	(United States) Nitro Circus	22 September-23 September	(Sweden) Timmy Hansen	(Sweden) Mattias Ekström	(United States) Tanner Foust

== Regional Series ==
=== Continental Series ===
Series	Organiser	Duration	(gold) Champion	(silver) Second place	(bronze) Third place
2018 Americas Rallycross Championship	(France) Fédération Internationale de l'Automobile	27 May-30 September	(United States) Scott Speed	(United States) Tanner Foust	(Sweden) Patrik Sandell
2018 ARX2 Series	(France) Fédération Internationale de l'Automobile	14 July-30 September	(United States) Conner Martell	(United States) Christian Brooks	(United States) Alex Keyes
2018 FIA European Rallycross Championship - Supercar	(France) Fédération Internationale de l'Automobile	13 April-15 September	(Latvia) Reinis Nitišs	(Sweden) Anton Marklund	(France) Cyril Raymond
2018 FIA European Rallycross Championship - Super1600	(France) Fédération Internationale de l'Automobile	13 April-13 October	(Lithuania) Rokas Baciuška	(Russia) Aydar Nuriev	(Latvia) Artis Baumanis
2018 FIA European Rallycross Championship - TouringCar	(France) Fédération Internationale de l'Automobile	10 May-1 July	(Belgium) Steve Volders	(Norway) Fredrik Rolid Magnussen	(Norway) Daniel Holten

=== Subregional Series ===
Series	Organiser	Duration	(gold) Champion	(silver) Second place	(bronze) Third place
2018 RallyX Nordic - Supercar	(Sweden) RallyX Nordic	5 May-15 October	(Sweden) Oliver Solberg	(Sweden) Oliver Eriksson	(Norway) Thomas Bryntesson
2018 RallyX Nordic - Supercar Lites	(Sweden) RallyX Nordic	5 May-15 October	(Belgium) Guillame De Ridder	(Norway) Ben-Philip Gundersen	(Norway) Sondre Evjen
2018 RallyX on Ice - Supercar Lites	(Sweden) RallyX Nordic	5 May-15 October	(Sweden) Oliver Eriksson	(Sweden) Kevin Eriksson	(Norway) Sondre Evjen
2018 RallyX on Ice - Speedcar Xtreme	(Sweden) RallyX Nordic	5 May-15 October	(Sweden) Kevin Hansen	(Norway) Finn Erik Løberg	(Sweden) Timmy Hansen
2018 FIA CEZ Rallycross - Supercar	(France) Fédération Internationale de l'Automobile	24 March-21 October	(Austria) Alois Höller	(Czech Republic) Lukáš Červený	(Hungary) Tamás Kárai
2018 FIA CEZ Rallycross - Super1600	(France) Fédération Internationale de l'Automobile	24 March-21 October	(Czech Republic) Jan Ratajský	(Austria) Raphael Dirnberger	(Czech Republic) Tomáš Krejčík
2018 FIA CEZ Rallycross - STC up 1600	(France) Fédération Internationale de l'Automobile	24 March-21 October	(Austria) Birgit Kuttner	(Austria) Richard Förster	(Austria) Raphael Dirnberger
2018 FIA CEZ Rallycross - STC up 2000	(France) Fédération Internationale de l'Automobile	24 March-21 October	(Czech Republic) Roman Častoral	(Czech Republic) Martin Šindelek	(Czech Republic) Tomáš Michal
2018 FIA CEZ Rallycross - STC over 2000	(France) Fédération Internationale de l'Automobile	24 March-21 October	(Slovakia) Miroslav Pospíchal	(Austria) Karl Schadenhofer	(Slovakia) Pavol Zachar

==== RallyX Nordic - Supercar ====
(key)

Pos.	Driver	HÖL (Sweden)	ARV (Sweden)	GRE (Norway)	NYS (Denmark)	KOU (Finland)	TIE (Sweden)	Points
1	(Sweden) Oliver Solberg	4	1	1	5	2	1	148
2	(Sweden) Oliver Eriksson	7	6	2	2	1	6	137
3	(Norway) Thomas Bryntesson	1	4	7	4	8	5	132
4	(Norway) Ola Frøshaug	8	7	5	6	5	8	96
5	(Sweden) Peter Hedström	6	5	6	10	4	12	94
6	(Sweden) Andreas Carlsson	11	9	4	7	7	4	87
7	(Sweden) Philip Gehrman	5	3		3		3	74
8	(Sweden) Daniel Thorén	12	8	3	8	17	9	59
9	(Sweden) Lukas Walfridson	2	2				7	58
10	(Sweden) Mats Öhman	3	11	8				41
11	(Denmark) Ulrik Linnemann				1		10	27
12	(Norway) Ole Kristian Temte	13	10	12			13	27
13	(Norway) Stene Johansen	14	13	10	11	31		27
14	(Sweden) Crister Dalmans	10	12				11	25
15	(Sweden) Robin Larsson						2	24
16	(Hungary) Lukács Kornél					6		18
17	(Norway) Anders Bråten	9						12
18	(Denmark) Dennis Romer				9			10
19	(Norway) Øivind Finstad	17						0
Pos.	Driver	HÖL (Sweden)	ARV (Sweden)	GRE (Norway)	NYS (Denmark)	KOU (Finland)	TIE (Sweden)	Points

- Note: Despite there being 41 drivers competing in the races in this championship, only 19 were eligible for the championship standings.

==== FIA CEZ Rallycross - Supercar ====
(key)

Pos.	Driver	SLV (Slovakia)	RAB (Hungary)	WAC (Austria)	TOR (Poland)	MAG1 (Italy)	SED1 (Czech Republic)	NYR (Hungary)	SED2 (Czech Republic)	GRE (Austria)	SLM (Poland)	MAG2 (Italy)	Points
1	(Austria) Alois Höller	1	2			3	1	6	1	5			142
2	(Czech Republic) Lukáš Červený	2			9		3	7		11	8	4	96
3	(Hungary) Tamás Kárai		1					1		1			82
4	(Hungary) Csaba Spitzmüller		3							2	5	1	81
5	(Italy) Oscar Ortfeldt			3		1		5				3	74
6	(Austria) Tristan Ekker			4				8	2	7			61
7	(Hungary) Attila Mozer		4					3		3			60
8	(Hungary) Zoltán Vass		5					2		5			56
9	(Austria) Michael Pucher			1				10		4			24
10	(Hungary) Zoltán Harsányi		6					4		7			47
11	(Czech Republic) Lukas Marek						4		3				44
12	(Austria) Christoph Holzner			2						9			32
Pos.	Driver	SLV (Slovakia)	RAB (Hungary)	WAC (Austria)	TOR (Poland)	MAG1 (Italy)	SED1 (Czech Republic)	NYR (Hungary)	SED2 (Czech Republic)	GRE (Austria)	SLM (Poland)	MAG2 (Italy)	Points

- Note: Despite there being 30 drivers competing in the races in this championship, only 12 were eligible for the championship standings.

=== National Series ===
Series	Organiser	Duration	(gold) Champion	(silver) Second place	(bronze) Third place
2018 MSA British Rallycross Championship	(England) Motorsport UK	17 March-4 November	(Isle of Man) Mark Higgins	(England) Julian Godfrey	(Republic of Ireland) Ollie O'Donovan
2018 MSA Supernational Rallycross Championship	(England) Motorsport UK	17 March-4 November	(England) Tristan Ovenden	(England) Jack Thorne	(England) Paul Coney
2018 Rallicross SM - SuperCar	(Finland) Rallicross SM	26 May-26 August	(Finland) Ari Perkiömäki	(Finland) Mikko Ikonen	(Finland) Riku Tahko
2018 Rallicross SM - SRC	(Finland) Rallicross SM	26 May-26 August	(Finland) Henri Haapamäki	(Finland) Joni-Pekka Rajala	(Finland) Mika Perttula
2018 Championnat de France de Rallycross - Supercar	(France) Fédération Française du Sport Automobile	5 May-21 October	(France) Antoine Masse	(France) Guerlain Chicherit	(France) Fabien Chanoine
2018 Championnat de France de Rallycross - Super1600	(France) Fédération Française du Sport Automobile	5 May-21 October	(France) Yvonnick Jagu	(France) Laurent Chartrain	(France) Allan Mottais
2018 Championnat de France de Rallycross - Division 3	(France) Fédération Française du Sport Automobile	5 May-21 October	(France) David Vincent	(France) Xavier Briffaud	(France) Grégory Le Guernevé
2018 Championnat de France de Rallycross - Division 4	(France) Fédération Française du Sport Automobile	5 May-21 October	(France) Xavier Goubill	(France) Florian Zavattin	(France) Aurélien Crochard
2018 Campionato Italiano Rallycross - Supercar	(Italy) RX Italia	31 March-4 November	(Italy) Marco Noris	(Italy) Oscar Ortfeldt	(Italy) Franco Mollo
2018 Campionato Italiano Rallycross - Super1600	(Italy) RX Italia	31 March-4 November	(Italy) Stefano Cerri	(Italy) Marco Valazza	(Italy) Marco Valsesia
2018 Russian Rallycross Championship - National; 2018 Чемпионат России Pалли-кросс - Национальный	(Russia) Russian Automobile Federation	11 May-9 September	(Russia) Egor Sanin	(Russia) Pavel Kalmanovich	(Russia) Denis Suvorov
2018 Russian Rallycross Championship - Super1600; 2018 Чемпионат России Pалли-кросс - Супер 1600	(Russia) Russian Automobile Federation	11 May-9 September	(Russia) Artur Egorov	(Russia) Mikhail Simonov	(Russia) Kirill Koroplev

==== MSA British Rallycross Championship ====
(key)

Pos.	Driver	SIL1 (England)	LYD1 (England)	CRO1 (England)	PEM1 (Wales)	PEM2 (Wales)	CRO2 (England)	LYD2 (England)	PEM3 (Wales)	SIL2 (England)	Points
1	(Isle of Man) Mark Higgins	7	1	2	5	2	3	1	3	1	194
2	(England) Julian Godfrey	4	2	6	4	3	1	5	1	2	192
3	(Republic of Ireland) Ollie O'Donovan	9	3	1	1	1	6	2	2	4	192
4	(England) Steve Hill	5	7	6	2	4	4	4	4	6	163
5	(Wales) Roger Thomas	6	9		3	6	7				103
6	(England) Kevin Procter	8	12			5	2	7			100
7	(England) Steve Mundy		11	7			8	6		9	84
8	(Wales) Liam Manning				6		8	6		9	76
9	(England) Oliver Bennett		5					3		11	60
10	(England) "Mad Mark" Watson	11	10	4							55
11	(England) Jake Harris		4					8			40
12	(Wales) Mike Manning		6							10	37
13	(England) Andy Grant	10						9			34
14	(Wales) Nigel Burke								6	10	33
15	(Scotland) Andy Scott			3							25
16	(Republic of Ireland) Pat Doran									3	25
16	(England) Dan Rooke									5	21
17	(England) Liam Doran		8								17
18	(France) Sébastien Loeb	1									0
19	(Sweden) Timmy Hansen	2									0
20	(Norway) Andreas Bakkerud	3									0
21	(France) Guerlain Chicherit	12									0
Pos.	Driver	SIL1 (England)	LYD1 (England)	CRO1 (England)	PEM1 (Wales)	PEM2 (Wales)	CRO2 (England)	LYD2 (England)	PEM3 (Wales)	SIL2 (England)	Points

- Note 1: There were four "guest drivers" in Round 1. Guest drivers do appear in MSA Rallycross standings but cannot score points.
- Note 2: Only the points from each driver's best seven results are counted towards the championship. Steve Hill was docked two points in addition to this

==== Rallicross SM - Supercar ====
(key)

Pos.	Driver	KAA (Finland)	HON (Finland)	JUR (Finland)	JAL (Finland)	KOU (Finland)	Points
1	(Finland) Ari Perkiömäki	1	6	1	7	1	123
2	(Finland) Mikko Ikonen	2	4	3	3	3	116
3	(Finland) Riku Tahko	3	3	2	2	6	113
4	(Finland) Jukka Lautamäki	6	1	12	1	2	111
5	(Finland) Janne Rinta-Kauhajärvi	5	2	6	8	5	85
6	(Finland) Miikka Kaskinen	4			6	4	55
7	(Finland) Ari-Pekka Niemi		5	5	4	12	54
8	(Finland) Mikko Malinen	9	13	4	15	11	42
9	(Finland) Niko Korhonen	13	12	7	13	8	41
10	(Finland) Jukka Pykäläinen	7	10	13	10		41
11	(Finland) Iivari Niemi	11		9	11	11	37
12	(Finland) Matti Nisula	10	14	10	16	10	33
13	(Finland) Kari Irri		9	8		9	30
14	(Finland) Jari Putkinen		8	11	12	13	28
Pos.	Driver	KAA (Finland)	HON (Finland)	JUR (Finland)	JAL (Finland)	KOU (Finland)	Points

- Note: Despite there being 20 drivers competing in the races in this championship, only 14 were eligible for the championship standings.

==== Championnat de France de Rallycross - Supercar ====
(key)

Pos.	Driver	ESS (France)	FAL1 (France)	CHA (France)	FAL2 (France)	SAR (France)	RUA (France)	KER (France)	MAY (France)	LES (France)	DRE (France)	Points
1	(France) Antoine Masse	2	8	8	2	1	2	1	1	3	1	317
2	(France) Guerlain Chicherit	1	1	1	3		1	8	10	2		252
3	(France) Fabien Chanoine	4	3	4	10	10	4	7	6	6	4	238
4	(France) Samuel Peu	9	4	7	1	2	3		2	4	8	232
5	(France) Philippe Maloigne	6	9	9	11	6	5	13	10	1	12	171
6	(France) Julien Febreau	3	7	2	9		3					145
7	(France) Laurent Bouliou	7	6	15	12	9	11	2	7	11	9	136
8	(France) Jonathan Pailler	16		3	4	7		9	5		5	128
9	(France) Damien Meunier	8	13	5	15	4	9	10	21	8	7	124
10	(France) Fabien Pailler			10	14	8		5	3		2	108
11	(France) David Olivier	11	17	18	5	14	7	4	4	7	16	108
12	(France) Jean-Sébastien Vigion	12	2	11	13		8		11		15	91
13	(France) Patrick Guillerme	14	11	12	18	12	6	15	14	15	21	81
14	(France) Adeline Sangnier	21		6	8						3	70
15	(France) David Meslier		16			5	10	22	15	9	11	61
16	(France) Christophe Jouet	5			6			12		5		58
17	(Belgium) Jochen Coox	12	12			11	15		13	13	13	54
18	(France) Emmanuel Anne	17	18					11	8	19	6	41
19	(France) Stéphane Lefebvre					3						35
20	(France) Yannick Couillet	23	23	17	17	15	12			14	19	25
21	(France) David Fevre	13	14	13							18	22
22	(France) Kévin Jacquinet	19	21	16	7	18	17	21	22	18	28	20
23	(France) Guy Moreton	15	15	20	22	13		16	19		17	19
24	(France) Christophe Saunois							6	17			16
25	(France) Frédéric Makowiecki								9			15
26	(France) Laurent Laskowski										10	14
27	(France) Hervé Lemonnier		10		19							13
28	(France) Alexandre Theuil									10		13
29	(France) Jean Juin		22					17	18	12	25	10
30	(France) Francis Balocchi	18	19	14	16	19			20		22	10
31	(France) Martial Barbette			19	20	16	13	18	23		26	8
32	(France) Jean-Luc Pailler							14				6
33	(France) Jean-Michel Mure	20				17	14	20		17	23	6
34	(France) Romuald Delaunay										14	5
35	(France) Florent Béduneau								16			4
36	(France) Emmanuel Galivel						16	24				2
37	(France) Christophe Wilt	22										0
38	(France) Gregory Pain		20					23		16	24	0
39	(France) Guillaume Bergeon				21							0
40	(France) Rodolphe Audran							19				0
41	(France) Nicolas Briand									20	20	0
42	(France) Gérard Roussel										27	0
Pos.	Driver	ESS (France)	FAL1 (France)	CHA (France)	FAL2 (France)	SAR (France)	RUA (France)	KER (France)	MAY (France)	LES (France)	DRE (France)	Points

==== Campionato Italiano Rallycross - Supercar ====
(key)

Pos.	Driver	MAG1 (Italy)	MAG2 (Italy)	MAG3 (Italy)	REV (Italy)	Points
1	(Italy) Marco Noris	2	2	2	1	108.5
2	(Italy) Oscar Ortfeldt	1	1	3	3	107
3	(Italy) Franco Mollo	3	7		4	58.5
4	(Italy) Nicola Agrelli		4	4	5	57
5	(Italy) Ivan Carmellino	6			2	51
6	(Italy) Alessandro Negri	4	6			34
7	(Italy) Massimo Nardin	8	5			32
8	(Italy) Werner Gurschler	5				19.5
9	(Italy) Daniele Tomassini	7				18
	(Hungary) Csaba Spitzmüller			1		0
	(Austria) Alois Höller		3			0
	(Czech Republic) Lukáš Červený			5		0
Pos.	Driver	MAG1 (Italy)	MAG2 (Italy)	MAG3 (Italy)	REV (Italy)	Points

- Note: As rounds 2 and 3 doubled as FIA CEZ Rallycross rounds, non-Italian drivers participated in the races but did not score points in the Italian championship.

==== Russian Rallycross Championship - National ====
(key)

Pos.	Driver	KAZ1 (Russia)	SEK1 (Russia)	SEK2 (Russia)	SEK3 (Russia)	KAZ2 (Russia)	BEL (Russia)	Points
1	(Russia) Egor Sanin	1	3	1	1	2	2	143
2	(Russia) Pavel Kalmanovich	5	2	2	2	4	1	115
3	(Russia) Denis Suvorov	11	6	3	3	3	11	96
4	(Russia) Arkadiy Illeritskiy	4	5	5	4	7	6	94
5	(Russia) Pavel Sokerkin	14	1	8	6	9	4	86
6	(Russia) Mikhail Tyagunov	9	7	4	13	6	3	80
7	(Russia) Arseniy Rod	13	4	12	7	20	5	57
8	(Russia) Aydar Nuriev	2				1		56
9	(Russia) Nikita Ushakov	20	13	6	5	16	7	45
10	(Russia) Pavel Korpachev	10	12	11	16		9	42
11	(Russia) Mikhail Donchenko	6	8	19	9	8		40
12	(Russia) Andrey Petukov	8	9	7		18		39
13	(Russia) Vyacheslav Staroverov	16	17	13	10	11	10	34
14	(Russia) Stanislav Evsenin		10	10	11			33
15	(Russia) Vladislav Dyomkin	3	14	15	23			27
16	(Russia) Rais Minnikhanov	19	15	22	15	5		23
17	(Russia) Anatoliy Sherbak	30	11	9	18	22	23	22
18	(Russia) Danil Berngardt	21	22	14	8	24	12	19
19	(Russia) Daniil Slepov	18		17	20	12	8	15
20	(Russia) Anvar Tytaev	7						12
21	(Russia) Aleksey Svalov					10		11
22	(Russia) Nikolay Shabanov			20	12	27	17	10
23	(Russia) Rafael Fattakhov	12						8
24	(Russia) Aleksandr Samsonov					13		4
25	(Russia) Evgeniy Goroshko	26	20	27	25	17	13	4
26	(Russia) Maksim Kornilkov	17	21	16		14		4
27	(Russia) Aleksey Shin		23	24	14			3
28	(Russia) Aleksey Kozlov			31	26	23	14	3
29	(Russia) Vladimir Zakharov						15	2
30	(Russia) Julia Strukova		16					1
31	(Russia) Dmitriy Dydin						16	1
32	(Russia) Ruslan Medevedev	18						0
33	(Russia) Daniil Moskalev	23	24	21	17			0
34	(Russia) Andrey Pirochenko	33	19	25	27	28	18	0
35	(Russia) Stepan Borisov			18			21	0
36	(Russia) Aleksey Volkov	37	18					0
37	(Russia) Aleksandr Alpeev	29	27	28	21	26	19	0
38	(Russia) Andrey Tyurin	22				19		0
39	(Russia) Anastasia Voronkova	27	29	26	22	25	20	0
40	(Russia) Aleksandr Shuvalov	25		23		21		0
41	(Russia) Anton Sochenko	34	25	29	28		22	0
42	(Russia) Nikita Yakuchenkov	24	26					0
43	(Russia) Viktor Sandybaev	28						0
44	(Russia) Aleksandr Kolesnichenko	32	28	30				0
45	(Russia) Andrey Fadeev	31						0
46	(Russia) Nikita Lushnichenko	35						0
47	(Russia) Eduard Sharafiev	36						0
Pos.	Driver	KAZ1 (Russia)	SEK1 (Russia)	SEK2 (Russia)	SEK3 (Russia)	KAZ2 (Russia)	BEL (Russia)	Points

== See also ==
- Rallycross
