= 2014 Junior WRC Championship =

The 2014 FIA Junior WRC Championship was the second season of the Junior WRC Championship, a rallying championship organised and governed by the Fédération Internationale de l'Automobile in association with Citroën Racing, running in support of the World Rally Championship.

The Junior WRC Championship was open to drivers under the age of twenty-eight. All teams contested in six European events, with all of their score counting towards their final championship position, in identical Citroën DS3 R3Ts using Michelin tyres.

The championship went to Stephane Lefebvre, who secured the title in Rallye de France Alsace with one round to spare. Alastair Fisher finished second, one point behind of Lefebvre and Martin Koči finished the championship third.

== Calendar ==
The final 2014 Junior WRC Championship calendar consisted of six European events, taken from the 2014 World Rally Championship.

Round	Dates	Rally name	Rally headquarters	Surface
1	3–6 April	Rally de Portugal	Faro, Algarve	Gravel
2	27–29 June	Rally Poland	Mikołajki, Warmia-Masuria	Gravel
3	1–3 August	Rally Finland	Jyväskylä, Keski-Suomi	Gravel
4	22–24 August	(Germany) Rallye Deutschland	Trier, Rhineland-Palatinate	Tarmac
5	3–5 October	Rallye de France Alsace	Strasbourg, Alsace	Tarmac
6	14–16 November	(United Kingdom) Wales Rally GB	Deeside, Flintshire	Gravel

== Drivers ==
The following drivers competed in the championship.

No.	Driver	Co-driver	Rounds
52	(Italy) Simone Tempestini	(Romania) Dorin Pulpea	1–5
52	(Italy) Simone Tempestini	(Italy) Matteo Chiarcossi	6
53	(Poland) Aron Domzala	(Poland) Przemek Zawada	1–3
53	(Poland) Aron Domzala	(Poland) Szymon Gospodarczyk	5
53	(Poland) Aron Domzala	(Poland) Kamil Heller	6
54	(Germany) Christian Riedemann	(Belgium) Lara Vanneste	1–2, 5
54	(Germany) Christian Riedemann	(Belgium) Michael Wenzel	4
55	(France) Quentin Giordano	(France) Guillaume Duval	1–2
55	(France) Quentin Giordano	(France) Valentin Sarreaud	3, 5–6
55	(France) Quentin Giordano	(France) Thomas Roux	4
56	(Slovakia) Martin Koči	(Czech Republic) Lukáš Kostka	All
57	(France) Stephane Lefebvre	(France) Thomas Dubois	1–5
58	(Australia) Molly Taylor	(Australia) Coral Taylor	1
58	(Australia) Molly Taylor	(United Kingdom) Sebastian Marshall	2–3, 6
59	(Cyprus) Panikos Polykarpou	(Austria) Gerald Winter	1–2
60	(France) Sylvain Michel	(France) Gwenola Marie	1
61	(Switzerland) Frederico Della Casa	(Italy) Domenico Pozzi	1–4
62	(United Kingdom) Alastair Fisher	(United Kingdom) Gordon Noble	All
63	(Hungary) Kornél Lukács	(Hungary) Márk Mesterházi	1–5
64	(Czech Republic) Jan Černý	(Czech Republic) Pavel Kohout	1
65	(Italy) Simone Campedelli	(Italy) Danilo Fappani	1
67	(United Arab Emirates) Mohammed Al Mutawaa	(United Kingdom) Stephen McAuley	4
68	(France) Eric Camilli	(France) Maxime Vilmot	4–5
69	(France) Frédéric Hauswald	(France) Olivier Ural	5
70	(France) Yohan Rossel	(France) Benoît Fulcrand	5
73	(Finland) Henri Haapamäki	(Finland) Marko Salminen	6

== Rule changes ==
- Citroën Racing became the car supplier for the 2014 and 2015 seasons, providing identical Citroën DS3 R3T that fell under the Group R3 regulations. They replaced M-Sport, who prepared identical Ford Fiesta R2 cars for the previous season and the WRC Academy in 2011 and 2012.
- Michelin replaced Hankook as the tyre supplier for the series.
- All competitors registered in the Manufacturers', WRC2, WRC3 and the Junior WRC championships were obliged to use a colour-coded windscreen sticker to distinguish its category.
- All competitors registered for the Junior WRC were also registered for scoring points in WRC3.
- Competitors no longer scored points per Stage Win. Only the final result of each rally counted toward the championship.

== Rally summaries ==
Round	Rally name	Podium finishers				Statistics			
Round	Rally name	Pos.	No.	Driver	Time	Stages	Length	Starters	Finishers
1	Rally de Portugal (3–6 April) — Results and report	1	57	(France) Stephane Lefebvre (France) Thomas Dubois	4:02:51.8	16	330.78 km	14	12
1	Rally de Portugal (3–6 April) — Results and report	2	54	(Germany) Christian Riedemann (Belgium) Lara Vanneste	4:03:54.5	16	330.78 km	14	12
1	Rally de Portugal (3–6 April) — Results and report	3	56	(Slovakia) Martin Koči (Czech Republic) Lukáš Kostka	4:06:22.4	16	330.78 km	14	12
2	Rally Poland (27–29 June) — Results and report	1	57	(France) Stephane Lefebvre (France) Thomas Dubois	2:58:25.3	24	336.64 km	11	9
2	Rally Poland (27–29 June) — Results and report	2	62	(United Kingdom) Alastair Fisher (United Kingdom) Gordon Noble	3:00:38.6	24	336.64 km	11	9
2	Rally Poland (27–29 June) — Results and report	3	55	(France) Quentin Giordano (France) Guillaume Duval	3:01:51.2	24	336.64 km	11	9
3	Rally Finland (1–3 August) — Results and report	1	56	(Slovakia) Martin Koči (Czech Republic) Lukáš Kostka	3:31:59.7	26	360.94 km	9	8
3	Rally Finland (1–3 August) — Results and report	2	55	(France) Quentin Giordano (France) Valentin Sarreaud	3:33:19.8	26	360.94 km	9	8
3	Rally Finland (1–3 August) — Results and report	3	58	(Australia) Molly Taylor (United Kingdom) Sebastian Marshall	3:47:15.7	26	360.94 km	9	8
4	(Germany) Rallye Deutschland (22–24 August) — Results and report	1	57	(France) Stephane Lefebvre (France) Thomas Dubois	3:27:45.4	18	324.31 km	10	6
4	(Germany) Rallye Deutschland (22–24 August) — Results and report	2	54	(Germany) Christian Riedemann (Belgium) Michael Wenzel	3:27:54.8	18	324.31 km	10	6
4	(Germany) Rallye Deutschland (22–24 August) — Results and report	3	55	(France) Quentin Giordano (France) Thomas Roux	3:33:21.5	18	324.31 km	10	6
5	Rallye de France-Alsace (Note: Due to technical irregularities, the seven Junior WRC finishers were excluded from the rally results. However, the drivers were allowed to keep their results within the Junior WRC class.) (3–5 October) — Results and report	1	62	(United Kingdom) Alastair Fisher (United Kingdom) Gordon Noble	2:57:06.5	18	303.63 km	10	7
5	Rallye de France-Alsace (3–5 October) — Results and report	2	68	(France) Eric Camilli (France) Maxime Vilmot	2:57:57.4	18	303.63 km	10	7
5	Rallye de France-Alsace (3–5 October) — Results and report	3	55	(France) Quentin Giordano (France) Valentin Sarreaud	2:58:27.5	18	303.63 km	10	7
6	(United Kingdom) Wales Rally GB (14–16 November) — Results and report	1	62	(United Kingdom) Alastair Fisher (United Kingdom) Gordon Noble	3:31:20.1	17	305,64 km	7	6
6	(United Kingdom) Wales Rally GB (14–16 November) — Results and report	2	56	(Slovakia) Martin Koči (Czech Republic) Lukáš Kostka	3:32:38.9	17	305,64 km	7	6
6	(United Kingdom) Wales Rally GB (14–16 November) — Results and report	3	73	(Finland) Henri Haapamäki (Finland) Marko Salminen	3:34:14.6	17	305,64 km	7	6

== Standings ==
=== FIA Junior WRC Championship for Drivers ===
Pos.	Driver	POR (Portugal)	POL (Poland)	FIN (Finland)	GER (Germany)	FRA (France)	GBR (United Kingdom)	Points
1	(France) Stéphane Lefebvre	1	1	7	1	4		93
2	(United Kingdom) Alastair Fisher	Ret	2	4	4	1	1	92
3	(Slovakia) Martin Koči	3	4	1	Ret	7	2	76
4	(France) Quentin Giordano	10	3	2	3	3	6	72
5	(Germany) Christian Riedemann	2	5		2			46
6	(Australia) Molly Taylor	8	8	3			4	35
7	(Poland) Aron Domżała	Ret	7	6		6	5	32
8	(Italy) Simone Tempestini	6	Ret	5	5	Ret	Ret	28
9	(France) Eric Camilli				Ret	2		18
10	(Switzerland) Federico della Casa	4	9	8	Ret			18
11	(Hungary) Kornél Lukács	12	6	Ret	6	Ret		16
12	(Finland) Henri Haapamäki						3	15
13	(France) Yohan Rossel					5		10
14	(Czech Republic) Jan Černý	7						6
15	(Cyprus) Panikos Polykarpou	9	Ret					2
Pos.	Driver	POR (Portugal)	POL (Poland)	FIN (Finland)	GER (Germany)	FRA (France)	GBR (United Kingdom)	Points

Key
Colour	Result
Gold	Winner
Silver	2nd place
Bronze	3rd place
Green	Points finish
Blue	Non-points finish
Blue	Non-classified finish (NC)
Purple	Did not finish (Ret)
Black	Excluded (EX)
Black	Disqualified (DSQ)
White	Did not start (DNS)
White	Cancelled (C)
Blank	Withdrew entry from the event (WD)

=== FIA Junior WRC Championship for Co-Drivers ===
Pos.	Co-driver	POR (Portugal)	POL (Poland)	FIN (Finland)	GER (Germany)	FRA (France)	GBR (United Kingdom)	Points
1	(France) Thomas Dubois	1	1	7	1	4		93
2	(United Kingdom) Gordon Noble	Ret	2	4	4	1	1	92
3	(Czech Republic) Lukáš Kostka	3	4	1	Ret	7	2	76
4	(France) Valentin Sarreaud			2		3	6	41
5	(United Kingdom) Sebastian Marshall		8	3			4	31
6	(Belgium) Lara Vanneste	2	5					28
7	(Romania) Dorin Pulpea	6	Ret	5	5	Ret		28
8	(Germany) Michael Wenzel				2			18
9	(France) Maxime Vilmot				Ret	2		18
10	(Italy) Domenico Pozzi	4	9	8	Ret			18
11	(France) Guillaume Duval	10	3					16
12	(Hungary) Márk Mesterházi	12	6	Ret	6	Ret		16
13	(France) Thomas Roux				3			15
14	(Finland) Marko Salminen						3	15
15	(Poland) Przemek Zawada	Ret	7	6				14
16	(France) Benoît Fulcrand					5		10
17	(Poland) Kamil Heller						5	10
18	(Poland) Szymon Gospodarczyk					6		8
19	(Czech Republic) Pavel Kohout	7						6
20	(Australia) Coral Taylor	8						4
21	(Austria) Gerald Winter	9	Ret					2
Pos.	Co-driver	POR (Portugal)	POL (Poland)	FIN (Finland)	GER (Germany)	FRA (France)	GBR (United Kingdom)	Points

Key
Colour	Result
Gold	Winner
Silver	2nd place
Bronze	3rd place
Green	Points finish
Blue	Non-points finish
Blue	Non-classified finish (NC)
Purple	Did not finish (Ret)
Black	Excluded (EX)
Black	Disqualified (DSQ)
White	Did not start (DNS)
White	Cancelled (C)
Blank	Withdrew entry from the event (WD)

=== FIA Junior WRC Championship for Nations ===
Pos.	Country	Drivers	POR (Portugal)	POL (Poland)	FIN (Finland)	GER (Germany)	FRA (France)	GBR (United Kingdom)	Points
1	France	Stéphane Lefebvre	1	1	7	1	4		193
1	France	Quentin Giordano	10	3	2	3	3	6	193
1	France	Eric Camilli				Ret	2		193
1	France	Yohan Rossel					5		193
2	United Kingdom	Alastair Fisher	Ret	2	4	4	1	1	92
3	Slovakia	Martin Koči	3	4	1	Ret	7	2	76
4	Germany	Christian Riedemann	2	5		2			46
5	Australia	Molly Taylor	8	8	3			4	35
6	Poland	Aron Domzala	Ret	7	6		6	5	32
7	Romania	Simone Tempestini	6	Ret	5	5	Ret	Ret	28
8	Switzerland	Frederico Della Casa	4	9	8	Ret			18
9	Hungary	Kornél Lukács	12	6	Ret	6	Ret		16
10	Finland	Henri Haapamäki						3	15
11	Czech Republic	Jan Černý	7						6
16	Cyprus	Panikos Polykarpou	9	Ret					2
Pos.	Country	Drivers	POR (Portugal)	POL (Poland)	FIN (Finland)	GER (Germany)	FRA (France)	GBR (United Kingdom)	Points

Key
Colour	Result
Gold	Winner
Silver	2nd place
Bronze	3rd place
Green	Points finish
Blue	Non-points finish
Blue	Non-classified finish (NC)
Purple	Did not finish (Ret)
Black	Excluded (EX)
Black	Disqualified (DSQ)
White	Did not start (DNS)
White	Cancelled (C)
Blank	Withdrew entry from the event (WD)
