= 2015 Monte Carlo Rally =

World Rally Championship event in Monaco and southern France

2015 Monte Carlo Rally 83ème Rallye Automobile Monte-Carlo
Round 1 of 13 of the 2015 World Rally Championship
Next event →
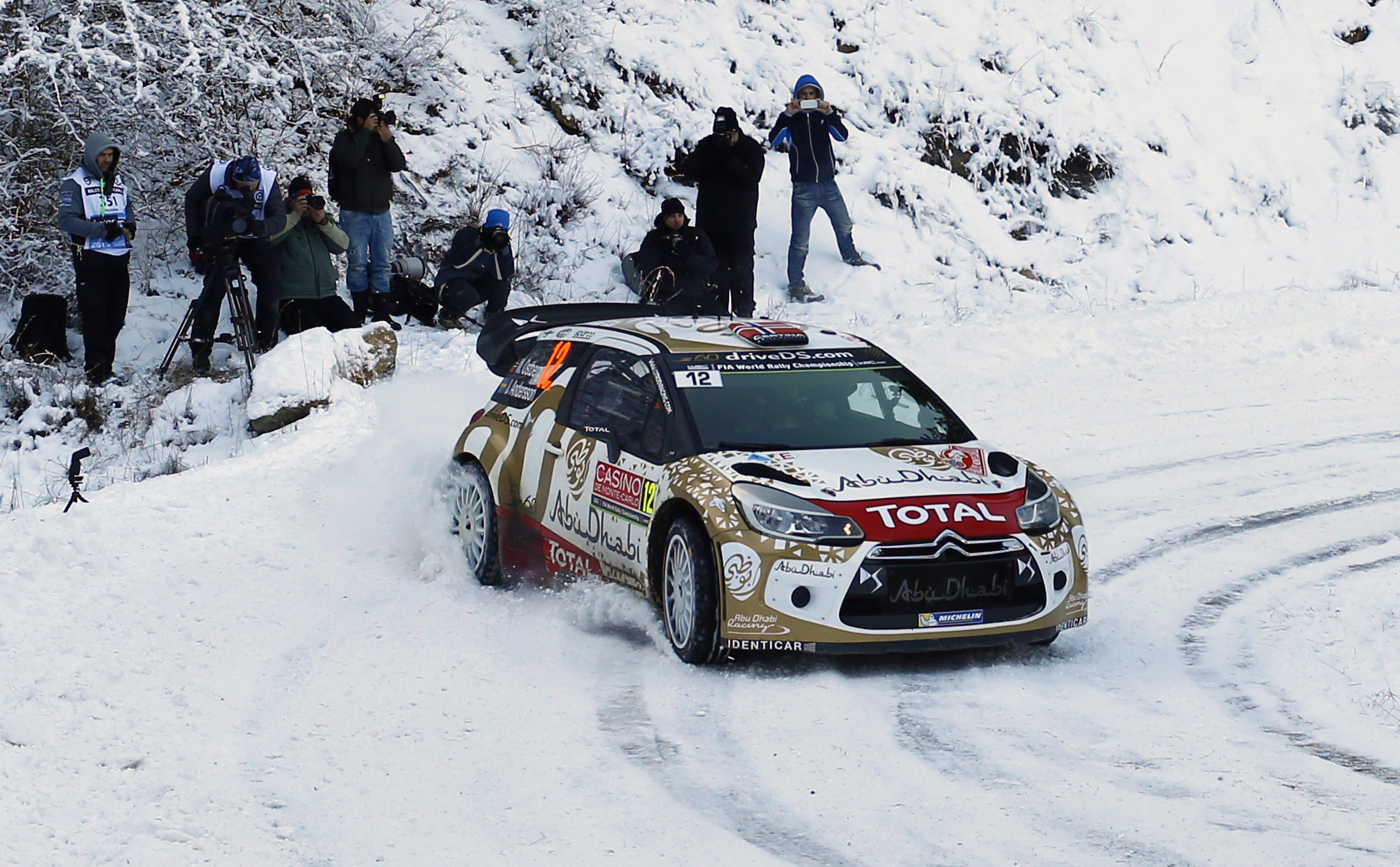
- Host country: Monaco
- Rally base: (France) Gap, Hautes-Alpes
- Dates run: 22 – 25 January 2015
- Stages: 15 (335.48 km; 208.46 miles)
- Stage surface: Tarmac and snow

Statistics
- Crews: 94 at start, 78 at finish

Overall results
- Overall winner: (France) Sébastien Ogier (France) Julien Ingrassia (Germany) Volkswagen Motorsport

The 2015 Monte Carlo Rally (formally known as the 83ème Rallye Automobile Monte-Carlo) was a motor racing event for rally cars that was held over four days between 22 and 25 January 2015. It marked the eighty-third running of the Monte Carlo Rally, and was the first round of the 2015 World Rally Championship, WRC-2, WRC-3, Junior World Rally Championship and FIA R-GT Cup seasons.

Defending World Champion Sébastien Ogier started the season with a win in Monte Carlo, his second consecutive in the principality and the 25th of his WRC career. Returning nine-time World Champion Sébastien Loeb was the early leader of the rally, losing first position to Ogier on the seventh stage after a spin while negotiating a hairpin bend. On the next stage, Loeb hit a rock and lost a total of six minutes, before retiring in the following liaison section. This gave Ogier a lead of almost two minutes over Volkswagen team-mate Jari-Matti Latvala. Despite being unable to monitor his rivals' split times during the stages under new rules, Ogier blended a controlled pace with safe tyre choices through the final two days to seal the victory. Latvala finished second, also taking one power stage point, with Andreas Mikkelsen completing a one-two-three for Volkswagen Motorsport. Citroën's Mads Østberg finished the event in fourth position. Hyundai Motorsport duo Thierry Neuville and Dani Sordo finished in fifth and sixth, split by 0.8 seconds. M-Sport's Elfyn Evans finished seventh, having dropped time after he damaged his car's rear suspension against a wall. Evans finished ahead of Loeb, who rejoined under rally-2 rules and won two power stage points. The top ten was completed by Martin Prokop and Kris Meeke, who won the power stage to take three additional points.

In the support classes, Stéphane Lefebvre won WRC-2 in 12th position overall, Quentin Gilbert finished as the best WRC-3/JWRC runner in 22nd place, just ahead of the FIA R-GT Cup winner François Delecour.

== Entry list ==
Notable entrants
No.	Entrant	Class	Driver	Co-driver	Car	Tyre
1	(Germany) Volkswagen Motorsport	WRC	(France) Sébastien Ogier	(France) Julien Ingrassia	Volkswagen Polo R WRC	MI
2	(Germany) Volkswagen Motorsport	WRC	(Finland) Jari-Matti Latvala	(Finland) Miikka Anttila	Volkswagen Polo R WRC	MI
3	(France) Citroën Total Abu Dhabi WRT	WRC	(United Kingdom) Kris Meeke	(Republic of Ireland) Paul Nagle	Citroën DS3 WRC	MI
4	(France) Citroën Total Abu Dhabi WRT	WRC	(France) Sébastien Loeb	(Monaco) Daniel Elena	Citroën DS3 WRC	MI
5	(United Kingdom) M-Sport Ltd	WRC	(United Kingdom) Elfyn Evans	(United Kingdom) Daniel Barritt	Ford Fiesta RS WRC	MI
6	(United Kingdom) M-Sport Ltd	WRC	(Estonia) Ott Tänak	(Estonia) Raigo Mőlder	Ford Fiesta RS WRC	MI
7	(Germany) Hyundai Motorsport	WRC	(Belgium) Thierry Neuville	(Belgium) Nicolas Gilsoul	Hyundai i20 WRC	MI
8	(Germany) Hyundai Motorsport	WRC	(Spain) Dani Sordo	(Spain) Marc Martí	Hyundai i20 WRC	MI
9	(Germany) Volkswagen Motorsport II	WRC	(Norway) Andreas Mikkelsen	(Norway) Ola Fløene	Volkswagen Polo R WRC	MI
12	(France) Citroën Total Abu Dhabi WRT	WRC	(Norway) Mads Østberg	(Sweden) Jonas Andersson	Citroën DS3 WRC	MI
14	(Norway) Henning Solberg	WRC	(Norway) Henning Solberg	(Austria) Ilka Minor	Ford Fiesta RS WRC	MI
15	(United Kingdom) M-Sport World Rally Team	WRC	(France) Bryan Bouffier	(France) Xavier Panseri	Ford Fiesta RS WRC	MI
16	(United Kingdom) RK M-Sport World Rally Team	WRC	(Poland) Robert Kubica	(Poland) Maciej Szczepaniak	Ford Fiesta RS WRC	P
17	(Italy) D-Max Racing	WRC	(Ukraine) Yuriy Protasov	(Ukraine) Pavlo Cherepin	Citroën DS3 WRC	P
18	(France) Sébastien Chardonnet	WRC	(France) Sébastien Chardonnet	(France) Thibaut de la Haye	Citroën DS3 WRC	MI
19	(France) Jean-Michel Raoux	WRC	(France) Jean-Michel Raoux	(France) Thomas Escartefigue	Ford Fiesta RS WRC	MI
21	(Czech Republic) Jipocar Czech National Team	WRC	(Czech Republic) Martin Prokop	(Czech Republic) Michal Ernst	Ford Fiesta RS WRC	P
32	(France) PH Sport	WRC-2	(France) Stéphane Lefebvre	(Belgium) Stéphane Prévot	Citroën DS3 R5	MI
33	(France) Quentin Giordano	WRC-2	(France) Quentin Giordano	(France) Valentin Sarreaud	Citroën DS3 R5	MI
34	(France) Saintéloc Junior Team	WRC-2	(Republic of Ireland) Craig Breen	(United Kingdom) Scott Martin	Peugeot 208 T16 R5	MI
35	(Greece) Jourdan Serderidis	WRC-2	(Greece) Jourdan Serderidis	(Belgium) William Mergny	Citroën DS3 R5	MI
36	(France) Julien Maurin	WRC-2	(France) Julien Maurin	(France) Nicolas Klinger	Ford Fiesta RRC	P
37	(Italy) FWRT s.r.l.	WRC	(Italy) Lorenzo Bertelli	(Italy) Giovanni Bernacchini	Ford Fiesta RS WRC	P
38	(Italy) Marco Vallario	WRC-2	(Italy) Marco Vallario	(Italy) Antonio Pascale	Mitsubishi Lancer Evolution X	DM
39	(France) Eric Camilli	WRC-2	(France) Eric Camilli	(France) Benjamin Veillas	Ford Fiesta R5	MI
40	(Switzerland) Jonathan Hirschi	WRC-2	(Switzerland) Jonathan Hirschi	(France) Vincent Landais	Peugeot 208 T16 R5	MI
41	(Austria) BRR Baumschlager Rallye & Racing Team	WRC-2	(Germany) Armin Kremer	(Germany) Klaus Wicha	Škoda Fabia S2000	P
42	(South Africa) Barry White	WRC-2	(South Africa) Henk Lategan	(South Africa) Barry White	Škoda Fabia S2000	P
43	(Slovakia) Styllex Slovak National Team	WRC-2	(Slovakia) Martin Koči	(Czech Republic) Lukáš Kostka	Ford Fiesta R5	MI
51	(France) Charlotte Dalmasso	WRC-3; JWRC	(France) Charlotte Dalmasso	(France) Marine Delon	Citroën DS3 R3T Max	MI
52	(Italy) Simone Tempestini	WRC-3; JWRC	(Italy) Simone Tempestini	(Italy) Matteo Chiarcossi	Citroën DS3 R3T Max	MI
53	(Finland) Printsport	WRC-3; JWRC	(Norway) Ole Christian Veiby	(Norway) Anders Jaæger	Citroën DS3 R3T Max	MI
54	(Republic of Ireland) Daniel McKenna	WRC-3; JWRC	(Republic of Ireland) Daniel McKenna	(Republic of Ireland) Andrew Grennan	Citroën DS3 R3T Max	MI
56	(Italy) Alessandro Re	WRC-3; JWRC	(Italy) Alessandro Re	(Italy) Giacomo Ciucci	Citroën DS3 R3T Max	MI
57	Équipe de France FFSA	WRC-3; JWRC	(France) Yohan Rossel	(France) Benoît Fulcrand	Citroën DS3 R3T Max	MI
58	(France) Terry Folb	WRC-3; JWRC	(France) Terry Folb	(France) Franck Le Floch	Citroën DS3 R3T Max	MI
59	(Hungary) Kornél Lukács	WRC-3; JWRC	(Hungary) Kornél Lukács	(Hungary) Márk Mesterházi	Citroën DS3 R3T Max	MI
60	(France) Quentin Gilbert	WRC-3; JWRC	(France) Quentin Gilbert	(France) Renaud Gamoul	Citroën DS3 R3T Max	MI
61	(Germany) ADAC Weser-Ems	WRC-3; JWRC	(Germany) Christian Riedemann	(Germany) Michael Wenzel	Citroën DS3 R3T Max	MI
76	(Republic of Ireland) Eamonn Boland	WRC-2	(Republic of Ireland) Eamonn Boland	(Republic of Ireland) Michael Joseph Morrissey	Subaru Impreza STi R4 D	MI
78	(France) Alain Foulon	WRC-2	(France) Alain Foulon	(France) Gilles Delarche	Mitsubishi Lancer Evolution X	MI
84	(France) Stéphane Consani	WRC-3	(France) Stéphane Consani	(France) Maxime Vilmot	Renault Clio R3T	P

Icon	Class
WRC	WRC entries eligible to score manufacturer points
WRC	Major entry ineligible to score manufacturer points
WRC-2	Registered to take part in WRC-2 championship
WRC-3	Registered to take part in WRC-3 championship
JWRC	Registered to take part in Junior World Rally championship

== Results ==
=== Special Stages ===
Stage	Winners	Co-Driver	Car	Time	Class Leaders
SD	(France) Sébastien Loeb	(Monaco) Daniel Elena	Citroën DS3 WRC	2:21.0	—N/a
SS1	(France) Sébastien Loeb	(Monaco) Daniel Elena	Citroën DS3 WRC	15:53.5	Loeb / Elena
SS2	(France) Sébastien Ogier	(France) Julien Ingrassia	Volkswagen Polo R WRC	13:57.1	Loeb / Elena
SS3	(France) Sébestien Loeb	(Monaco) Daniel Elena	Citroën DS3 WRC	10:23.9	Loeb / Elena
SS4	(Poland) Robert Kubica	(Poland) Maciej Szczepaniak	Ford Fiesta RS WRC	15:27.0	Loeb / Elena
SS5	(Poland) Robert Kubica	(Poland) Maciej Szczepaniak	Ford Fiesta RS WRC	15:13.2	Loeb / Elena
SS6	(France) Sébastien Loeb	(Monaco) Daniel Elena	Citroën DS3 WRC	10:26.1	Loeb / Elena
SS7	(Poland) Robert Kubica	(Poland) Maciej Szczepaniak	Ford Fiesta RS WRC	14:36.1	Ogier / Ingrassia
SS8	(France) Sebastien Ogier	(France) Julien Ingrassia	Volkswagen Polo R WRC	15:15.9	Ogier / Ingrassia
SS10	(Poland) Robert Kubica	(Poland) Maciej Szczepaniak	Ford Fiesta RS WRC	30:41.9	Ogier / Ingrassia

Pos.	No.	Driver	Co-driver	Team	Car	Class	Time	Difference	Points
Overall classification
1	1	(France) Sébastien Ogier	(France) Julien Ingrassia	(Germany) Volkswagen Motorsport	Volkswagen Polo R WRC	WRC	3:36:40.2	0.0	25
2	2	(Finland) Jari-Matti Latvala	(Finland) Miikka Anttila	(Germany) Volkswagen Motorsport	Volkswagen Polo R WRC	WRC	3:37:38.2	+58.0	19
3	9	(Norway) Andreas Mikkelsen	(Norway) Ola Fløene	(Germany) Volkswagen Motorsport II	Volkswagen Polo R WRC	WRC	3:38:52.5	+2:12.3	15
4	12	(Norway) Mads Østberg	(Sweden) Jonas Andersson	(France) Citroën Total Abu Dhabi WRT	Citroën DS3 WRC	WRC	3:39:23.8	+2:43.6	12
5	7	(Belgium) Thierry Neuville	(Belgium) Nicolas Gilsoul	(Germany) Hyundai Motorsport	Hyundai i20 WRC	WRC	3:39:52.3	+3:12.1	10
6	8	(Spain) Dani Sordo	(Spain) Marc Martí	(Germany) Hyundai Motorsport	Hyundai i20 WRC	WRC	3:39:53.1	+3:12.9	8
7	5	(United Kingdom) Elfyn Evans	(United Kingdom) Daniel Barritt	(United Kingdom) M-Sport World Rally Team	Ford Fiesta RS WRC	WRC	3:42:03.9	+5:23.7	6
8	4	(France) Sébastien Loeb	(Monaco) Daniel Elena	(France) Citroën Total Abu Dhabi WRT	Citroën DS3 WRC	WRC	3:45:14.9	+8:34.7	6
9	21	(Czech Republic) Martin Prokop	(Czech Republic) Jan Tománek	(Czech Republic) Jipocar Czech National Team	Ford Fiesta RS WRC	WRC	3:46:35.0	+9:54.8	2
10	3	(United Kingdom) Kris Meeke	(Republic of Ireland) Paul Nagle	(France) Citroën Total Abu Dhabi WRT	Citroën DS3 WRC	WRC	3:47:35.8	+10:55.6	3
WRC-2 standings
1 (12.)	32	(France) Stéphane Lefebvre	(Belgium) Stéphane Prévot	(France) PH Sport	Citroën DS3 R5	WRC-2	3:49:36.7	0.0	25
2 (13.)	34	(Republic of Ireland) Craig Breen	(United Kingdom) Scott Martin	(France) Saintéloc Junior Team	Peugeot 208 T16 R5	WRC-2	3:51:50.7	+2:14.0	18
3 (14.)	41	(Germany) Armin Kramer	(Germany) Klaus Wicha	(Austria) BRR Baumschlager Rallye & Racing Team	Škoda Fabia S2000	WRC-2	3:52:03.7	+2:27.0	15
4 (15.)	39	(France) Eric Camilli	(France) Benjamin Veillas	(France) Eric Camilli	Ford Fiesta R5	WRC-2	3:54:36.4	+4:59.7	12
5 (19.)	40	(Switzerland) Jonathan Hirschi	(France) Vincent Landais	(Switzerland) Jonathan Hirschi	Peugeot 208 T16 R5	WRC-2	3:59:29.5	+9:52.8	10
6 (21.)	33	(France) Quentin Giordano	(France) Valentin Sarreaud	(France) Quentin Giordano	Citroën DS3 R5	WRC-2	4:06:43.7	+17:17.0	8
7 (66.)	78	(France) Alain Foulon	(France) Gilles Delarche	(France) Alain Foulon	Mitsubishi Lancer Evolution X	WRC-2	4:52:15.9	+1:02:39.2	6
8 (75.)	38	(Italy) Marco Vallario	(Italy) Manuela di Lorenzo	(Italy) Marco Vallario	Mitsubishi Lancer Evolution X	WRC-2	5:14:44.3	+1:25:07.6	4
WRC-3 standings
1 (22.)	60	(France) Quentin Gilbert	(Belgium) Renaud Jamoul	(France) Quentin Gilbert	Citroën DS3 R3T Max	WRC-3	4:08:32.7	0.0	25
2 (24.)	61	(Germany) Christian Riedemann	(Germany) Michael Wenzel	(Germany) ADAC Weser-Ems	Citroën DS3 R3T Max	WRC-3	4:10:56.4	+2:23.7	18
3 (25.)	53	(Norway) Ole Christian Veiby	(Norway) Anders Jæger	(Finland) Printsport	Citroën DS3 R3T Max	WRC-3	4:12:04.1	+3:31.4	15
4 (27.)	52	(Italy) Simone Tempestini	(Italy) Matteo Chiarcossi	(Italy) Simone Tempestini	Citroën DS3 R3T Max	WRC-3	4:14:01.1	+5:28.4	12
5 (31.)	84	(France) Stéphane Consani	(France) Maxime Vilmot	(France) Stéphane Consani	Renault Clio R3T	WRC-3	4:17:57.6	+9:24.9	10
6 (33.)	57	(France) Yohan Rossel	(France) Benoît Fulcrand	Équipe de France FFSA	Citroën DS3 R3T Max	WRC-3	4:20:00.4	+11:27.7	8
7 (35.)	56	(Italy) Alessandro Re	(Italy) Giacomo Ciucci	(Italy) Alessandro Re	Citroën DS3 R3T Max	WRC-3	4:20:37.2	+12:04.5	6
8 (43.)	59	(Hungary) Kornél Lukács	(Hungary) Márk Mesterházi	(Hungary) Kornél Lukács	Citroën DS3 R3T Max	WRC-3	4:28:35.1	+20:02.4	4
9 (61.)	51	(France) Charlotte Dalmasso	(France) Marine Delon	(France) Charlotte Dalmasso	Citroën DS3 R3T Max	WRC-3	4:47:43.1	+39:10.4	2
JWRC standings
1 (22.)	60	(France) Quentin Gilbert	(Belgium) Renaud Jamoul	(France) Quentin Gilbert	Citroën DS3 R3T Max	JWRC	4:08:32.7	0.0	25
2 (24.)	61	(Germany) Christian Riedemann	(Germany) Michael Wenzel	(Germany) ADAC Weser-Ems	Citroën DS3 R3T Max	JWRC	4:10:56.4	+2:23.7	18
3 (25.)	53	(Norway) Ole Christian Veiby	(Norway) Anders Jæger	(Finland) Printsport	Citroën DS3 R3T Max	JWRC	4:12:04.1	+3:31.4	15
4 (27.)	52	(Italy) Simone Tempestini	(Italy) Matteo Chiarcossi	(Italy) Simone Tempestini	Citroën DS3 R3T Max	JWRC	4:14:01.1	+5:28.4	12
5 (33.)	57	(France) Yohan Rossel	(France) Benoît Fulcrand	Équipe de France FFSA	Citroën DS3 R3T Max	JWRC	4:20:00.4	+11:27.7	8
6 (35.)	56	(Italy) Alessandro Re	(Italy) Giacomo Ciucci	(Italy) Alessandro Re	Citroën DS3 R3T Max	JWRC	4:20:37.2	+12:04.5	6
7 (43.)	59	(Hungary) Kornél Lukács	(Hungary) Márk Mesterházi	(Hungary) Kornél Lukács	Citroën DS3 R3T Max	JWRC	4:28:35.1	+20:02.4	4
8 (61.)	51	(France) Charlotte Dalmasso	(France) Marine Delon	(France) Charlotte Dalmasso	Citroën DS3 R3T Max	JWRC	4:47:43.1	+39:10.4	2

== Championship standings after the event ==
=== WRC ===
Drivers' Championship standings

Pos.	Driver	Points
1	(France) Sébastien Ogier	25
2	(Finland) Jari-Matti Latvala	19
3	(Norway) Andreas Mikkelsen	15
4	(Norway) Mads Østberg	12
5	(Belgium) Thierry Neuville	10

Manufacturers' Championship standings

Pos.	Constructor	Points
1	(Germany) Volkswagen Motorsport	43
2	(Germany) Hyundai Motorsport	27
3	(United Kingdom) M-Sport World Rally Team	12
4	(France) Citroën Total Abu Dhabi WRT	12
5	(Czech Republic) Jipocar Czech National Team	6

=== Other ===
WRC2 Drivers' Championship standings

Pos.	Driver	Points
1	(France) Stéphane Lefebvre	25
2	(Republic of Ireland) Craig Breen	18
3	(Germany) Armin Kremer	15
4	(France) Eric Camilli	12
5	(Switzerland) Jonathan Hirschi	10

WRC3 Drivers' Championship standings

Pos.	Driver	Points
1	(France) Quentin Gilbert	25
2	(Germany) Christian Riedemann	18
3	(Norway) Ole Christian Veiby	15
4	(Italy) Simone Tempestini	12
5	(France) Stéphane Consani	10

JWRC Drivers' Championship standings

Pos.	Driver	Points
1	(France) Quentin Gilbert	25
2	(Germany) Christian Riedemann	18
3	(Norway) Ole Christian Veiby	15
4	(Italy) Simone Tempestini	12
5	(France) Yohan Rossel	10

FIA R-GT Drivers' Championship standings

Pos.	Driver	Points
1	(France) François Delecour	25
2	(France) Romain Dumas	18
3	(Belgium) Marc Duez	15
