= 2018 FIA European Rallycross Championship =

FIA European Rallycross Championship season

The 2018 FIA European Rallycross Championship was the 43rd season of the FIA European Championships for Rallycross Drivers. The season consists of nine rounds across three categories; Supercar, Super1600 and TouringCar. This season is confirmed as the final season for TouringCar. The season commenced on 14 April with the Spanish round at the Circuit de Barcelona-Catalunya, and culminated on 13 October in Germany at the Estering.

Swede Anton Marklund is the defending Supercar champion, Hungarian Krisztián Szabó the defending Super1600 champion and Norwegian Lars Øivind Enerberg the defending TouringCar champion.

Steve Volders was crowned the TouringCar champion on 18 August 2018 after champion-elect Sivert Svardal was disqualified from the final round in Höljes.

== Calendar ==
Round	Event	Venue	Dates	Category	Final winner	Car	Team
1	(Spain) Euro RX of Barcelona	Circuit de Barcelona-Catalunya	13–14 April	Supercar	(Latvia) Reinis Nitišs	Ford Fiesta	(Finland) Set Promotion
1	(Spain) Euro RX of Barcelona	Circuit de Barcelona-Catalunya	13–14 April	Super1600	(Latvia) Artis Baumanis	Škoda Fabia	(Hungary) Volland Racing
2	Euro RX of Portugal	Pista Automóvel de Montalegre	26–27 April	Super1600	(Latvia) Artis Baumanis	Škoda Fabia	(Hungary) Volland Racing
3	Euro RX of Belgium	Circuit Jules Tacheny Mettet	10–11 May	Supercar	(Sweden) Anton Marklund	Volkswagen Polo	(Sweden) Marklund Motorsport
3	Euro RX of Belgium	Circuit Jules Tacheny Mettet	10–11 May	TouringCar	(Sweden) Fredrik Salsten	Citroën DS3	(Sweden) Salsten Racing
4	Euro RX of Norway	Lånkebanen	7–8 June	Super1600	(Finland) Jesse Kallio	Renault Twingo	(Finland) Set Promotion
4	Euro RX of Norway	Lånkebanen	7–8 June	TouringCar	(Norway) Daniel Holten	Ford Fiesta	(Norway) Daniel Holten
5	Euro RX of Sweden	Höljesbanan	30 June–1 July	Supercar	(Latvia) Reinis Nitišs	Ford Fiesta	(Finland) Set Promotion
5	Euro RX of Sweden	Höljesbanan	30 June–1 July	TouringCar	(Belgium) Steve Volders	Ford Fiesta	(Belgium) N.R. Trommelke vzw
6	Euro RX of France	Circuit de Lohéac	31 August–1 September	Supercar	(France) Cyril Raymond	Peugeot 208	(France) Cyril Raymond
6	Euro RX of France	Circuit de Lohéac	31 August–1 September	Super1600	(Russia) Aydar Nuriev	Škoda Fabia	(Hungary) Volland Racing
7	Euro RX of Latvia	Biķernieku Kompleksā Sporta Bāze	14–15 September	Supercar	(Latvia) Reinis Nitišs	Ford Fiesta	(Finland) Set Promotion
7	Euro RX of Latvia	Biķernieku Kompleksā Sporta Bāze	14–15 September	Super1600	(Lithuania) Rokas Baciuška	Audi A1	(Hungary) Volland Racing
8	Euro RX of Germany	Estering	12–13 October	Super1600	(Russia) Aydar Nuriev	Škoda Fabia	(Hungary) Volland Racing

== Entry list ==
=== Supercar ===
Supercar entries
Constructor	Entrant	Car	No.	Drivers	Rounds
Audi	(Hungary) Nyirád Motorsport	Audi A1	50	(Hungary) Attila Mózer	All
Audi	(Hungary) Kárai Motorsport Egyesület	Audi A1	102	(Hungary) Tamás Kárai	All
Audi	(Sweden) EKS Audi Sport	Audi S1	123	(Hungary) Krisztián Szabó	4-5
Citroën	(Portugal) Mário Barbosa	Citroën DS3	75	(Portugal) Mário Barbosa	1–2,4
Ford	(Norway) Knut Ove Børseth	Ford Focus	70	(Norway) Knut Ove Børseth	3
Ford	(Finland) Set Promotion	Ford Fiesta	15	(Latvia) Reinis Nitišs	All
Ford	(Belgium) M.D.K.	Ford Fiesta	49	(Belgium) M.D.K.	1-4
Ford	(Sweden) Mats Ӧhman	Ford Fiesta	54	(Sweden) Mats Ӧhman	1-3
Ford	(Lithuania) TSK Baltijos Sportas	Ford Fiesta	55	(Lithuania) Paulius Pleskovas	All
Ford	(Finland) Joni-Pekka Rajala	Ford Fiesta	60	(Finland) Joni-Pekka Rajala	5
Ford	(Republic of Ireland) Derek Tohill	Ford Fiesta	111	(Republic of Ireland) Derek Tohill	All
Ford	(Sweden) JC Raceteknik	Ford Fiesta	90	(Norway) Thomas Bryntesson	All
Ford	(Sweden) JC Raceteknik	Ford Fiesta	91	(Norway) Ola Frøshaug	All
Volkswagen	(Sweden) JC Raceteknik	Volkswagen Polo	69	(Norway) Sondre Evjen	5
Peugeot	(France) Dubourg Auto	Peugeot 208	18	(Sweden) Magda Andersson	2–5
Peugeot	(France) Dubourg Auto	Peugeot 208	23	(France) Andréa Dubourg	All
Peugeot	(United Kingdom) Andrew Scott	Peugeot 208	23	(United Kingdom) Andrew Scott	3
Peugeot	(France) Fabien Pailler	Peugeot 208	20	(France) Fabien Pailler	4
Peugeot	(France) Florent Béduneau	Peugeot 208	39	(France) Florent Béduneau	All
Peugeot	(France) Rodolphe Audran	Peugeot 208	56	(France) Rodolphe Audran	All
Peugeot	(France) Patrick Guillerme	Peugeot 208	83	(France) Patrick Guillerme	1–2, 4
Peugeot	(France) Cyril Raymond	Peugeot 208	113	(France) Cyril Raymond	2-5
Renault	(France) G-Fors	Renault Clio	14	(Finland) Jere Kalliokoski	All
Renault	(France) G-Fors	Renault Clio	87	(France) Jean-Baptiste Dubourg	All
Renault	(Sweden) Lukas Walfridson	Renault Clio	48	(Sweden) Lukas Walfridson	All
SEAT	(Germany) ALL-INKL.COM Münnich Motorsport	SEAT Ibiza	77	(Germany) René Münnich	All
Audi	(Germany) ALL-INKL.COM Münnich Motorsport	Audi S3	38	(Germany) Mandie August	3
Škoda	(Czech Republic) KRTZ Mot ACCR Czech Team	Škoda Fabia	99	(Czech Republic) Aleš Fučík	All
Volkswagen	(Sweden) Eklund Motorsport	Volkswagen Beetle	76	(Sweden) Philip Gehrman	All
Volkswagen	(Sweden) Eklund Motorsport	Volkswagen Beetle	86	(Norway) Anders Bråten	All
Volkswagen	(Sweden) Peter Hedström	Volkswagen Polo	8	(Sweden) Peter Hedström	All
Volkswagen	(Sweden) Hedströms Motorsport	Volkswagen Polo	37	(Sweden) Daniel Thorén	5
Volkswagen	(Hungary) Speedy Motorsport	Volkswagen Polo	10	(Hungary) Lukács Kornél	All
Volkswagen	(Norway) Kjetil Larsen	Volkswagen Polo	64	(Norway) Kjetil Larsen	All
Volkswagen	(Denmark) Ulrik Linnemann	Volkswagen Polo	72	(Denmark) Ulrik Linnemann	All
Volkswagen	(Sweden) Marklund Motorsport	Volkswagen Polo	92	(Sweden) Anton Marklund	All
Volkswagen	(Denmark) Dennis Rømer	Volkswagen Polo	27	(Denmark) Dennis Rømer	3

=== Super1600 ===
Super1600 entries
Constructor	Entrant	Car	No.	Drivers	Rounds
Alfa Romeo	(Italy) Andrea Carretti	Alfa Romeo MiTo	59	(Italy) Andrea Carretti	6
Audi	(Hungary) Volland Racing	Audi A1	14	(Lithuania) Rokas Baciuška	All
Audi	(Hungary) Volland Racing	Audi A1	17	(Latvia) Artis Baumanis	4-6
Citroën	(Portugal) Hélder Ribeiro	Citroën C2	22	(Portugal) Hélder Ribeiro	2
Citroën	(France) Jimmy Terpereau	Citroën C2	37	(France) Jimmy Terpereau	All
Citroën	(France) Maximilien Eveno	Citroën C2	75	(France) Maximilien Eveno	All
Citroën	(Norway) Morten Majormoen	Citroën C2	85	(Norway) Guro Majormoen	3, 6
Citroën	(Norway) Marius Bermingrud	Citroën DS3	51	(Norway) Marius Bermingrud	All
Ford	(Portugal) Bompiso Racing	Ford Fiesta	77	(Portugal) Mário Teixeira	2
Ford	(Czech Republic) LS Tech ACCR Czech Team	Ford Fiesta	5	(Czech Republic) Ondrej Smetana	All
Ford	(Estonia) Reinsalu Sport	Ford Ka	29	(Estonia) Arvo Kask	3
Peugeot	(Czech Republic) Jihočeský autoklub v AČR	Peugeot 207	96	(Czech Republic) Marcel Suchý	All
Peugeot	(Norway) Espen Isaksćtre	Peugeot 208	8	(Norway) Espen Isaksćtre	All
Peugeot	(Czech Republic) Veverka ACCR Czech Team	Peugeot 208	66	(Czech Republic) Václav Veverka	1-5
Peugeot	(Denmark) Ulrik Linnemann	Peugeot 208	86	(Czech Republic) Jan Skala	3
Renault	(France) Anthony Jan	Renault Clio	35	(France) Anthony Jan	4
Renault	(Netherlands) Marcel Snoeijers	Renault Mégane	50	(Netherlands) Marcel Snoeijers	1–2, 4, 6
Renault	(Latvia) Rencenu Autoklubs	Renault Twingo	7	(Russia) Marat Knyazev	All
Renault	(Estonia) RS Racing Team	Renault Twingo	20	(Estonia) Siim Saluri	1, 4-6
Renault	(Russia) Artur Egorov	Renault Twingo	99	(Russia) Artur Egorov	1–2, 4-6
Renault	(Finland) Set Promotion	Renault Twingo	74	(Finland) Jesse Kallio	All
Renault	(Finland) Set Promotion	Renault Twingo	89	(Russia) Timur Shigabutdinov	All
Renault	(Norway) Lars Christian Lote Rosland	Renault Twingo	80	(Norway) Lars Christian Lote Rosland	1–3, 5-6
Škoda	(Czech Republic) Diana ACCR Czech Team	Škoda Fabia	3	(Czech Republic) Pavel Vimmer	All
Škoda	(Estonia) Janno Ligur	Škoda Fabia	10	(Estonia) Janno Ligur	1-5
Škoda	(Hungary) Volland Racing	Škoda Fabia	15	(Hungary) Gergely Márton	All
Škoda	(Hungary) Volland Racing	Škoda Fabia	17	(Latvia) Artis Baumanis	1-3
Škoda	(Hungary) Volland Racing	Škoda Fabia	48	(Russia) Aydar Nuriev	All
Škoda	(Czech Republic) Noprosu ACCR Czech Team	Škoda Fabia	16	(Czech Republic) Josef Šusta	All
Škoda	(Hungary) Speedy Motorsport	Škoda Fabia	18	(Hungary) Zsolt Szíjj	1-5
Škoda	(France) Yvonnick Jagu	Škoda Fabia	31	(France) Yvonnick Jagu	4
Škoda	(Latvia) Martins Spīķis	Škoda Fabia	34	(Latvia) Juris Spīķis	3
Škoda	(Germany) ALL-INKL.COM Münnich Motorsport	Škoda Fabia	38	(Germany) Mandie August	All
Škoda	(Latvia) Arnis Odiņš	Škoda Fabia	33	(Latvia) Arnis Odiņš	5
Volkswagen	(Norway) Anders Hansen	Volkswagen Polo	4	(Norway) Anders Hansen	3, 5
Volkswagen	(Poland) Jakub Wyszyński	Volkswagen Polo	57	(Poland) Jakub Wyszyński	1–2

=== TouringCar ===
TouringCar entries
Constructor	Entrant	Car	No.	Drivers	Rounds
Audi	(Norway) Camilla Antonsen	Audi A1	15	(Norway) Camilla Antonsen	All
BMW	(Norway) Sondre Hansen	BMW 120	82	(Norway) Sondre Hansen	3
BMW	(Germany) Ralf Evers	BMW e87	28	(Germany) Ralf Evers	1, 3
Citroën	(Norway) Jan-Emil Wilsberg	Citroën DS3	8	(Norway) Jan-Emil Wilsberg	All
Citroën	(Sweden) Salsten Racing	Citroën DS3	17	(Sweden) Fredrik Salsten	All
Ford	(Norway) Anders Bråten	Ford Fiesta	3	(Norway) Anders Bråten	2
Ford	(Norway) Daniel Holten	Ford Fiesta	10	(Norway) Daniel Holten	All
Ford	(Norway) Fredrik Rolid Magnussen	Ford Fiesta	12	(Norway) Fredrik Rolid Magnussen	All
Ford	(Norway) Kenneth Johansen	Ford Fiesta	75	(Norway) Kenneth Johansen	All
Ford	(Belgium) N.R. Trommelke vzw	Ford Fiesta	77	(Belgium) Steve Volders	All
Ford	(Denmark) Troels Daarbak	Ford Fiesta	93	(Denmark) Tobias Daarbak	All
Ford	(Norway) Ole Morten Tangen	Ford Fiesta	94	(Norway) Ole Morten Tangen	1, 3
Ford	(Republic of Ireland) Peter McGarry	Ford Fiesta	111	(Republic of Ireland) Peter McGarry	3
Mazda	(Norway) Per Magne Røyrås	Mazda RX-8	5	(Norway) Per Magne Røyrås	All
Mazda	(Finland) Jari Jaakkola	Mazda RX-8	6	(Finland) Jari Jaakkola	All
Mazda	(Norway) Sivert Svardal	Mazda RX-8	9	(Norway) Sivert Svardal	All
Mazda	(Norway) Fredrik Ågedal	Mazda RX-8	24	(Norway) Fredrik Ågedal	2
Mazda	(Norway) Ernst Atle Larsen	Mazda RX-8	27	(Norway) Ernst Atle Larsen	2-3
Toyota	(Sweden) Sören Hedlund	Toyota Auris	83	(Sweden) Sören Hedlund	2-3
Volkswagen	(Netherlands) Jo van de Ven	Volkswagen Polo	56	(Netherlands) Jo van de Ven	All
Volvo	(Sweden) Daniel Lundh	Volvo C30	19	(Sweden) Daniel Lundh	All
Volvo	(Belgium) Oud-Turnhout Rally Team VZW	Volvo C30	22	(Belgium) Filip Baelus	All

== Championship standings ==
European championship points are scored as follows:

	Position															
Round	1st	2nd	3rd	4th	5th	6th	7th	8th	9th	10th	11th	12th	13th	14th	15th	16th
Heats	16	15	14	13	12	11	10	9	8	7	6	5	4	3	2	1
Semi-finals	6	5	4	3	2	1										
Final	8	5	4	3	2	1										

- A red background denotes drivers who did not advance from the round

(key)

=== Supercar ===
Pos.	Driver	BAR (Spain)	BEL (Belgium)	SWE (Sweden)	FRA (France)	LAT (Latvia)	Points
1	(Latvia) Reinis Nitišs	1	2	1	6	1	135
2	(Sweden) Anton Marklund	2	1	14	3	3	101
3	(France) Cyril Raymond		3	4	1	2	100
4	(Norway) Thomas Bryntesson	18	8	2	4	11	62
5	(France) Jean-Baptiste Dubourg	3	13	7	12	7	61
6	(Denmark) Ulrik Linnemann	5	5	24	8	15	53
7	(Germany) René Münnich	11	9	5^{a}	10	4	52
8	(Hungary) Krisztián Szabó				2	6	47
9	(Sweden) Peter Hedström	6	4	6	27	26	46
10	(Finland) Jere Kalliokoski	17	10	19	5	8	43
11	(Sweden) Lukas Walfridson	10	12	3	18	14	43
12	(France) Andréa Dubourg	13	7	8	16	17	29
13	(Sweden) Philip Gehrman	4	17	20	20	10	28
14	(Republic of Ireland) Derek Tohill	9	14	13	13	13	25
15	(Norway) Ola Frøshaug	7	20	12	22	18	19
16	(Norway) Kjetil Larsen	14	19	17	21	9	15
17	(Portugal) Mário Barbosa	24	25		9		14
18	(Norway) Sondre Evjen					5	12
19	(Belgium) Michael De Keersmaeckeer	25	11	15	29		12
20	(Sweden) Mats Ӧhman	21	18	9			10
21	(United Kingdom) Andrew Scott			10			10
22	(Norway) Anders Bråten	15	6	11	15	19^{a}	7
23	(Hungary) Tamás Kárai	12	16	16	11^{a}	12	5
24	(Lithuania) Paulius Pleskovas	16	23	27	23	27	1
25	(Finland) Joni-Pekka Rajala					16	1
26	(Sweden) Magda Andersson		15	18^{a}	7	22	0
27	(France) Fabien Pailler				19		0
28	(France) Rodolphe Audran	20	21	26	26		0
29	(Sweden) Daniel Thorén					20	0
30	(Hungary) Attila Mózer	23	22	21	25	21	0
31	(Germany) Mandie August			22			0
32	(Czech Republic) Aleš Fučík	26	26	23	28	25	0
33	(Denmark) Dennis Romer			28			0
34	(Norway) Knut Ove Børseth			30			0
35	(France) Florent Béduneau	8	28	25	14	23^{a}	-1
36	(France) Patrick Guillerme	19	27		24^{a}		-15
37	(Hungary) Lukács Kornél	22	24	29^{a}	17^{a}	24^{a}	-60
Pos.	Driver	BAR (Spain)	BEL (Belgium)	SWE (Sweden)	FRA (France)	LAT (Latvia)	Points

^{a} Loss of fifteen championship points – stewards' decision

=== Super1600 ===
Pos.	Driver	BAR (Spain)	POR (Portugal)	NOR (Norway)	FRA (France)	LAT (Latvia)	GER (Germany)	Points
1	(Lithuania) Rokas Baciuška	4	4	3				63
2	(Russia) Aydar Nuriev	8	10	2				52
3	(Latvia) Artis Baumanis	1	1	4				65
4	(France) Jimmy Terpereau	2	6	12				47
5	(Norway) Espen Isaksćtre	6	2	8				44
6	(Estonia) Janno Ligur	9	8	6				44
7	(Hungary) Gergely Márton	3	14	5				43
8	(Finland) Jesse Kallio	15	9	1				42
9	(France) Maximilien Eveno	7	24	10				42
10	(Czech Republic) Josef Šusta	13	7	7				36
11	(Czech Republic) Ondřej Smetana	5	3	14				34
12	(Czech Republic) Václav Veverka	10	5	17				24
13	(Norway) Marius Bermingrud	18	11	9				24
14	(Hungary) Zsolt Szíjj	11	12	25				9
15	(Czech Republic) Pavel Vimmer	12	17	16				9
16	(Czech Republic) Jan Skala			11				8
17	(Russia) Timur Shigabutdinov	16	13	24				5
18	(Poland) Jakub Wyszyński	14	15					5
19	(Norway) Anders Hansen			13				4
20	(Russia) Marat Knyazev	17	23	15				2
21	(Norway) Lars Christian Lote Rosland	22	16	21				1
22	(Latvia) Juris Spīķis			18				0
23	(Russia) Artur Egorov	19	18					0
23	(Czech Republic) Marcel Suchý	20	25	19				0
25	(Germany) Mandie August	21	19	22				0
26	(Estonia) Arvo Kask			20				0
27	(Luxembourg) Marcel Snoeijers	23	20					0
28	(Portugal) Hélder Ribeiro		21					0
29	(Portugal) Mário Teixeira		22					0
30	(Norway) Guro Majormoen		23					0
31	(Estonia) Siim Saluri	24						0
Pos.	Driver	BAR (Spain)	POR (Portugal)	NOR (Norway)	FRA (France)	LAT (Latvia)	GER (Germany)	Points

=== TouringCar ===
Pos.	Driver	BEL (Belgium)	NOR (Norway)	SWE (Sweden)	Points
1	(Belgium) Steve Volders	2	3	8	60
2	(Norway) Fredrik Rolid Magnussen	8	4	1	59
3	(Norway) Daniel Holten	9	1	4	58
4	(Norway) Jan-Emil Wilsberg	7	2	9	52
5	(Norway) Camilla Antonsen	6	10	5	44
6	(Sweden) Daniel Lundh	3	7	16	41
7	(Denmark) Tobias Daarbak	11	9	3	39
8	(Norway) Per Magne Røyrås	4	13	6	38
9	(Norway) Sivert Svardal	5	5	DQ ^{a}	33
10	(Sweden) Fredrik Salsten	1	11	17	32
11	(Norway) Sondre Hansen			2	23
12	(Sweden) Sören Hedlund		12	7	22
13	(Norway) Anders Bråten		6		20
14	(Norway) Fredrik Ågedal		8		15
15	(Norway) Ernst Atle Larsen		14	10	10
16	(Norway) Ole Morten Tangen	10		DQ ^{a}	10
17	(Germany) Ralf Evers	12		13	9
18	(Republic of Ireland) Peter McGarry			11	6
19	(Finland) Jari Jaakkola	DQ ^{a}	16	12	6
20	(Belgium) Filip Baelus	DQ ^{a}	15	14	5
21	(Netherlands) Jo van de Ven	14	17	15	5
22	(Norway) Kenneth Johansen	13	18	DQ ^{a}	4
Pos.	Driver	BEL (Belgium)	NOR (Norway)	SWE (Sweden)	Points

^{a} Disqualified by stewards' decision

== See also ==
2018 in rallycross
