= Circuit de Faleyras =

Racing circuit in France

- Location: Faleyras, France
- Coordinates: 44°45′7″N 0°14′28″E
- Opened: 1974
- Major events: FIA European Rallycross, French Rallycross

Rallycross Circuit
- Length: 1.036 km (0.644 miles)
- Turns: 7

The Circuit de Faleyras is a racing circuit in Faleyras, Gironde, used for rallycross and autocross events.

== History ==
Built in 1974, the circuit initially hosted autocross events with rallycross events beginning in 1990. From that year onwards, the circuit became a regular host for the Championnat de France de Rallycross, with the circuit occasionally hosting a round of the FIA European Rallycross Championship, with the most recent occasion being in 2002. In the late 2000s however, French racing championships moved away from the site.

In 2013, the Faleyras Circuit was sold to Amoleen Racing headed by Stéphane Zittoun, who signed an agreement with the race organizers, allowing the return of rallycross and autocross stages. Amoleen Racing also developed an improvement plan to allow for additional sports activities to be hosted on site.

== See also ==
- Rallycross
- FIA European Rallycross Championship
