= Lukács Kornél =

Hungarian rally and rallycross driver (born 1991)

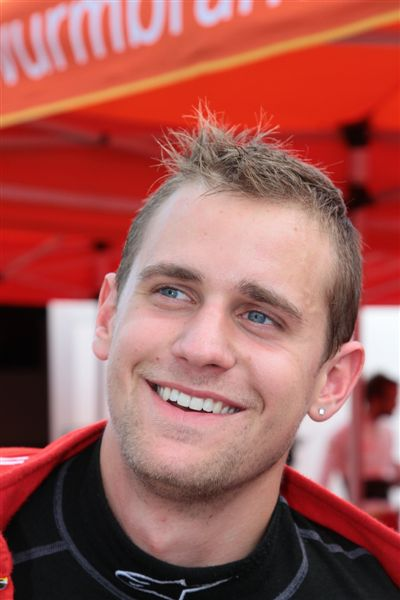
- Nationality: Hungarian
- Born: 5 September 1991 (age 35)

FIA World Rallycross Championship career
- Debut season: 2017
- Current team: Speedy Motorsport
- Car number: 10
- Starts: 12
- Wins: 0
- Podiums: 0
- Best finish: 42nd in 2017

FIA European Rallycross Championship
- Years active: 2016
- Starts: 4
- Wins: 0
- Podiums: 0
- Best finish: 13th (Supercar) in 2016

World Rally Championship record
- Years active: 2014–2015
- Teams: Wurmbrand Racing
- Rallies: 7
- Rally wins: 0
- Total points: 8
- First rally: 2014 Rally de Portugal
- Last rally: 2015 Rally de Portugal

Lukács "Csucsu" Kornél (born 5 September 1991) is a Hungarian rally and rallycross driver.

Kornél competed for Wurmbrand Racing and Arrabona Rallye Club in the JWRC, EWRC and the Hungarian Rally Series events. His co-driver is Márk Mesterházi.

Kornél currently competes in the FIA World Rallycross Championship with Speedy Motorsport in a Kia Rio.

== Career ==
=== Early career ===
Since his childhood, Kornél has participated in racing competitions. Originally, he started his career as a motorcycle racer before switching to rallying. After participating several amateur competitions, he rapidly moved up to professional racing level.

At the age of 16, Kornél started his amateur driver career by entering smaller events with a Suzuki Swift. In 2009, he and his co-driver Márk Mesterházi were driving rally sprints.

=== Professional rallying ===
==== 2010 ====
In this season was Kornél's first professional year by entering the Hungarian Rally tour category driving a Honda Civic.

==== 2011 ====
Kornél was driving a Citroën C2 R2 Max. This year, he entered the ERC category. His best race was the Hungarian IRC run, the Mecsek Rally where he gained the 2. place.

==== 2012 ====
This season, Kornél switched to Tatai Aréna Sportsclub. With a new Citroën C2 R2, he participated three ERC and six Hungarian Rally Series Events. On his debut event at the 47. Mogul Rallye Šumava Klatovy Csucsu along with Márk Mesterházi took rd place. This success was followed by 23. Waldviertel Rally, where he won the event in his category.

==== 2013 ====
In 2013, Kornél participated continuously rally events. He drove a Mitsubishi Lancer Evo IX in the Hungarian Rally Series and he entered nine ERC events. He won the 56. Tour the Corse and finished second in the overall standings in the ERC 2WD category.

==== 2014 ====
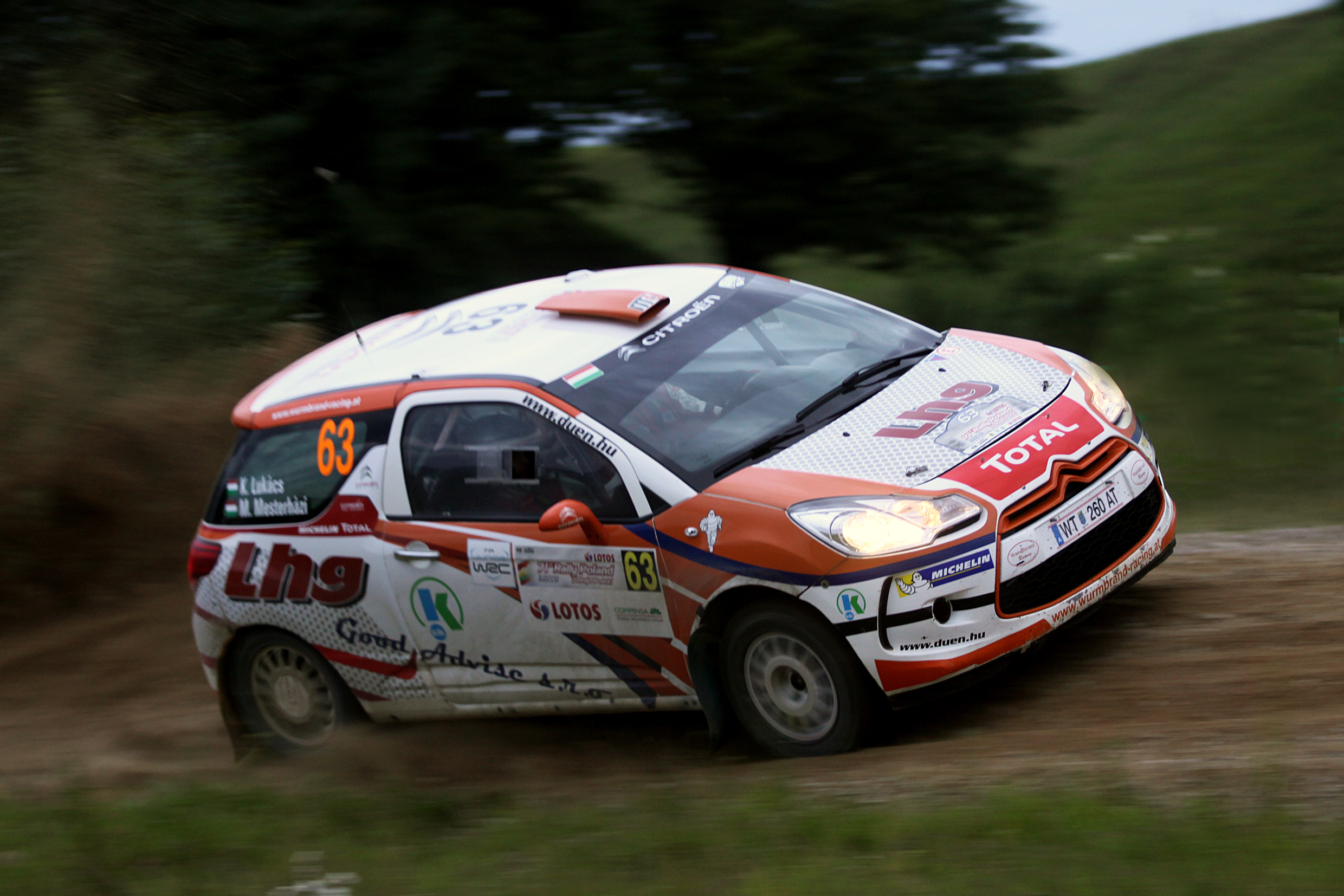
Citroën driven by Lukács Kornél

In 2014, Kornél competed in the ERC with a Mitsubishi Lancer Evo IX and his first as a JWRC driver with the Wurmbrand Racing Team. He drove a Citroën DS3 R3T.

== Results ==
=== Complete ERC results ===
(key)

Year	Team	Car	1	2	3	4	5	6	7		8	9	10	11	12	Position	Points
2011	Váci Autó SE	Citroën C2 R2 Max	ITA	HR	TUR	BEL	BUL	POR	CZE		ESP	POL	FRA	SUI		-	0
2011	Váci Autó SE	Citroën C2 R2 Max								Ret						-	0
2012	Tatai Aréna SE	Citroën C2 R2 Max	AUT	ITA	HR	BUL	BEL	TUR	POR		CZE	ESP	POL	SUI			
2012	Tatai Aréna SE	Citroën C2 R2 Max									42		21				
2013	Tatai Aréna SE	Citroën C2 R2 Max	AUT	LAT	ESP	POR	FRA	BEL	ROM		CZE	POL	HR	ITA	SUI		
2013	Tatai Aréna SE	Citroën C2 R2 Max	27	28			13	Ret	Ret		Ret	Ret	22	23			
2014	Tatai Aréna SE	Mitsubishi Lancer Evo IX	AUT	LAT	GRE	IRL	POR	BEL	EST		CZE	CYP	SUI	FRA			
2014	Tatai Aréna SE	Mitsubishi Lancer Evo IX	15	Ret													

Ret = Retired

=== WRC results ===
(key)

Year	Entrant	Car	1	2	3	4	5	6	7	8	9	10	11	12	13	Pos.	Points
2014	Kornél Lukács	Citroën DS3 R3T	MON	SWE	MEX	POR; 54	ARG	ITA								NC	0
2014	Wurmbrand Racing	Citroën DS3 R3T							POL; 38	FIN; Ret	GER; 28	AUS	FRA; Ret	ESP	GBR	NC	0
2015	Kornél Lukács	Citroën DS3 R3T Max	MON; 43	SWE	MEX	ARG	POR; 55	ITA	POL	FIN	GER	AUS	FRA	ESP	GBR	NC	0

==== WRC-3 results ====
(key)

Year	Entrant	Car	1	2	3	4	5	6	7	8	9	10	11	12	13	Pos.	Points
2014	Kornél Lukács	Citroën DS3 R3T	MON	SWE	MEX	POR; 12	ARG	ITA								12th	16
2014	Wurmbrand Racing	Citroën DS3 R3T							POL; 6	FIN; Ret	GER; 6	AUS	FRA; Ret	ESP	GBR	12th	16
2015	Kornél Lukács	Citroën DS3 R3T Max	MON; 8	SWE	MEX	ARG	POR; 11	ITA	POL	FIN	GER	AUS	FRA	ESP	GBR	22nd	4

==== JWRC results ====
(key)

Year	Entrant	Car	1	2	3	4	5	6	7	Pos.	Points
2014	Kornél Lukács	Citroën DS3 R3T	POR; 12							11th	16
2014	Wurmbrand Racing	Citroën DS3 R3T		POL; 6	FIN; Ret	GER; 6	FRA; Ret	GBR		11th	16
2015	Kornél Lukács	Citroën DS3 R3T Max	MON; 7	POR; 9	POL	FIN	FRA	ESP	GBR	16th	8

Ret = Retired

=== Complete FIA European Rallycross Championship results ===
(key)

==== Supercar ====
Year	Entrant	Car	1	2	3	4	5	ERX	Points
2016	Speedy Motorsport	Ford Focus	BEL; 4	NOR; 18	SWE; 13	BAR; 13	LAT	13th	24
2018	Speedy Motorsport	Volkswagen Polo	BAR; 22	BEL; 24	SWE	FRA	LAT	26th*	0*

^{*} Season still in progress.

=== Complete FIA World Rallycross Championship results ===
(key)

==== Supercar ====
Year	Entrant	Car	1	2	3	4	5	6	7	8	9	10	11	12	WRX	Points
2017	Speedy Motorsport	Kia Rio	BAR; 16	POR; 20	HOC; 22	BEL; 24†	GBR; 21	NOR; 22	SWE; 22	CAN; 19	FRA; 22	LAT; 17	GER; 20	RSA; 22	42nd	-9

^{†} Ten Championship points deducted for sealing an additional turbo after scrutineering.

== Trainings ==
- 2012 LRS London Rally School- UK
- 2012 2.CO-Driver Rally School – Huszárokelőpuszta, Hungary
- 2013 Tommi Mäkinen Racing School- Finland

== Awards, Trophies ==
- 2011: Award from the City Tata for the Exceptional talented Sportsman
- 2013: 2. Place in FIA ERC 2WD category
