= 2014 Rally de Portugal =

Motor rally competition

2014 Rally Portugal 48º Rally de Portugal
Round 4 of the 2014 World Rally Championship season
← Previous event	Next event →
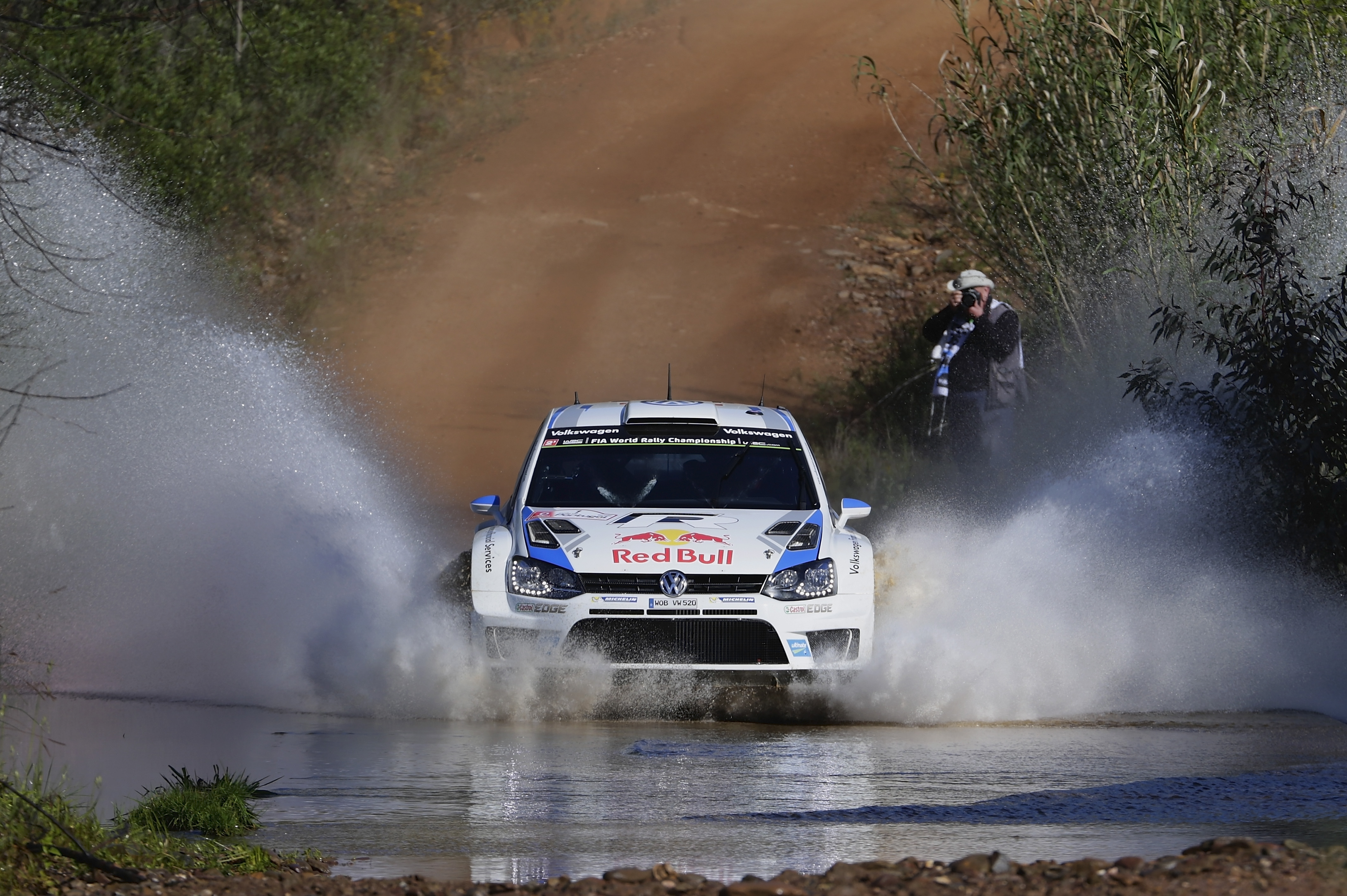
- Sébastien Ogier during Rally
- Host country: Portugal
- Rally base: Faro, Portugal
- Dates run: April 3 – April 6, 2014
- Stages: 16 (339.46 km; 210.93 miles)
- Stage surface: Gravel
- Overall distance: 1,394.30 km (866.38 miles)

Statistics
- Crews: 84 at start, 60 at finish

Overall results
- Overall winner: (France) Sébastien Ogier (France) Julien Ingrassia (Germany) Volkswagen Motorsport

The 2014 Rally de Portugal was the fourth round of the 2014 World Rally Championship season. The event was based in Faro, Portugal, and started on 3 April and finished on 6 April after sixteen special stages, totaling 339.5 competitive kilometres, including a street stage in Lisbon on 3 April.

WRC Champion Sébastien Ogier won the Rally de Portugal for the fourth time, taking his third victory of the 2014 season.

== Entry list ==
Entry List
No.	Entrant	Class	Driver	Co-driver	Car	Tyre
1	(Germany) Volkswagen Motorsport	WRC	(France) Sébastien Ogier	(France) Julien Ingrassia	Volkswagen Polo R WRC	M
2	(Germany) Volkswagen Motorsport	WRC	(Finland) Jari-Matti Latvala	(Finland) Miikka Anttila	Volkswagen Polo R WRC	M
3	(France) Citroën Total Abu Dhabi WRT	WRC	(United Kingdom) Kris Meeke	(Republic of Ireland) Paul Nagle	Citroën DS3 WRC	M
4	(France) Citroën Total Abu Dhabi WRT	WRC	(Norway) Mads Østberg	(Sweden) Jonas Andersson	Citroën DS3 WRC	M
5	(United Kingdom) M-Sport World Rally Team	WRC	(Finland) Mikko Hirvonen	(Finland) Jarmo Lehtinen	Ford Fiesta RS WRC	M
6	(United Kingdom) M-Sport World Rally Team	WRC	(United Kingdom) Elfyn Evans	(United Kingdom) Daniel Barritt	Ford Fiesta RS WRC	M
7	(Germany) Hyundai Motorsport	WRC	(Belgium) Thierry Neuville	(Belgium) Nicolas Gilsoul	Hyundai i20 WRC	M
8	(Germany) Hyundai Motorsport	WRC	(Finland) Juho Hänninen	(Finland) Tomi Tuominen	Hyundai i20 WRC	M
9	(Germany) Volkswagen Motorsport II	WRC	(Norway) Andreas Mikkelsen	(Finland) Mikko Markkula	Volkswagen Polo R WRC	M
10	(United Kingdom) RK M-Sport World Rally Team	WRC	(Poland) Robert Kubica	(Poland) Maciej Szczepaniak	Ford Fiesta RS WRC	M
11	(United Kingdom) M-Sport World Rally Team	WRC	(Estonia) Ott Tänak	(Estonia) Raigo Mõlde	Ford Fiesta RS WRC	M
12	(France) Citroën Total Abu Dhabi World Rally Team	WRC	(United Arab Emirates) Khalid Al Qassimi	(United Kingdom) Chris Patterson	Citroën DS3 WRC	M
16	(Norway) Henning Solberg	WRC	(Norway) Henning Solberg	(Austria) Ilka Minor	Ford Fiesta RS WRC	P
20	(Germany) Hyundai Motorsport N	WRC	(Spain) Dani Sordo	(Spain) Marc Martí	Hyundai i20 WRC	M
21	(Czech Republic) Jipocar Czech National Team	WRC	(Czech Republic) Martin Prokop	(Czech Republic) Jan Tománek	Ford Fiesta RS WRC	M
32	(Ukraine) Yuriy Protasov	WRC-2	(Ukraine) Yuriy Protasov	(Ukraine) Pavlo Cherepin	Ford Fiesta R5	M
33	(Italy) www.Rallyproject.com srl	WRC-2	(Italy) Massimiliano Rendina	(Italy) Mario Pizzuti	Mitsubishi Lancer Evo X	P
35	(United Kingdom) Drive DMACK	WRC-2	(Finland) Jari Ketomaa	(Finland) Kaj Lindström	Ford Fiesta R5	D
36	(Republic of Ireland) Robert Barrable	WRC-2	(Republic of Ireland) Robert Barrable	(United Kingdom) Stuart Loudon	Ford Fiesta R5	D
37	(Italy) FWRT s.r.l.		(Italy) Lorenzo Bertelli	(Italy) Mitia Dotta	Ford Fiesta R5	P
38	(Sweden) Fredrik Åhlin	WRC-2	(Sweden) Fredrik Åhlin	(Norway) Morten Erik Abrahamsen	Ford Fiesta R5	D
39	(Ukraine) Eurolamp World Rally Team	WRC-2	(Ukraine) Valeriy Gorban	(Ukraine) Volodymyr Korsia	MINI John Cooper Works S2000	M
40	(Qatar) Nasser Al-Attiyah	WRC-2	(Qatar) Nasser Al-Attiyah	(Italy) Giovanni Bernacchini	Ford Fiesta RRC	M
41	(Peru) Nicolás Fuchs	WRC-2	(Peru) Nicolás Fuchs	(Argentina) Fernando Mussano	Ford Fiesta R5	D
42	(Sweden) Pontus Tidemand	WRC-2	(Sweden) Pontus Tidemand	(Norway) Ola Floene	Ford Fiesta R5	M
43	(Portugal) Bernardo Sousa	WRC-2	(Portugal) Bernardo Sousa	(Portugal) Hugo Magalhães	Ford Fiesta RRC	P
44	(France) Julien Maurin	WRC-2	(France) Julien Maurin	(France) Nicolas Klinger	Ford Fiesta RRC	P
45	(Indonesia) Bosowa Rally Team	WRC-2	(Indonesia) Subhan Aksa	(Italy) Nicola Arena	Ford Fiesta RRC	M
46	(United Arab Emirates) Skydive Dubai Rally Team	WRC-2	(United Arab Emirates) Rashid Al Ketbi	(Germany) Karina Hepperle	Ford Fiesta R5	D
47	(Germany) Puma Rally Team	WRC-2	(Qatar) Abdulaziz Al-Kuwari	(Republic of Ireland) Killian Duffy	Ford Fiesta RRC	M
48	(Ukraine) AT Rally Team	WRC-2	(Estonia) Martin Kangur	(Estonia) Andres Ots	Ford Fiesta S2000	M
49	(United Kingdom) Martin McCormack	WRC-2	(United Kingdom) Martin McCormack	(Republic of Ireland) David Moynihan	Ford Fiesta R5	H
50	(Italy) Marco Vallario	WRC-2	(Italy) Marco Vallario	(Italy) Antonio Pascale	Mitsubishi Lancer Evo X	D
52	(Italy) Simone Tempestini	WRC-3	(Italy) Simone Tempestini	(Romania) Dorin Pulpea	Citroën DS3 R3T	M
53	(Poland) Aron Domzala	WRC-3	(Poland) Aron Domzala	(Poland) Przemek Zawada	Citroën DS3 R3T	M
54	(Germany) ADAC Team Weser-Ems e.V.	WRC-3	(Germany) Christian Riedemann	(Belgium) Lara Vanneste	Citroën DS3 R3T	M
55	(France) Quentin Giordano	WRC-3	(France) Quentin Giordano	(France) Guillaume Duval	Citroën DS3 R3T	M
56	(Slovakia) Martin Koči	WRC-3	(Slovakia) Martin Koči	(Czech Republic) Lukáš Kostka	Citroën DS3 R3T	M
57	(France) Stéphane Lefebvre	WRC-3	(France) Stéphane Lefebvre	(France) Thomas Dubois	Citroën DS3 R3T	M
58	(Australia) Molly Taylor	WRC-3	(Australia) Molly Taylor	(Australia) Coral Taylor	Citroën DS3 R3T	M
59	(Austria) Team Jaga Motorsport	WRC-3	(Cyprus) Panikos Polykarpou	(Austria) Gerald Winter	Citroën DS3 R3T	M
60	(France) Sylvain Michel	WRC-3	(France) Sylvain Michel	(France) Gwenola Marie	Citroën DS3 R3T	M
61	(Switzerland) Frederico Della Casa	WRC-3	(Switzerland) Frederico Della Casa	(Italy) Domenico Pozzi	Citroën DS3 R3T	M
62	(United Kingdom) Alastair Fisher	WRC-3	(United Kingdom) Alastair Fisher	(United Kingdom) Gordon Noble	Citroën DS3 R3T	M
63	(Austria) Wurmbrand Racing Team	WRC-3	(Hungary) Kornél Lukács	(Hungary) Márk Mesterházi	Citroën DS3 R3T	M
64	(Czech Republic) Czech National Team	WRC-3	(Czech Republic) Jan Černý	(Czech Republic) Pavel Kohout	Citroën DS3 R3T	M
65	(Italy) Simone Campedelli	WRC-3	(Italy) Simone Campedelli	(Italy) Danilo Fappani	Citroën DS3 R3T	M
70	(Estonia) Karl Kruuda	WRC-2	(Estonia) Karl Kruuda	(Estonia) Martin Järveoja	Ford Fiesta S2000	M
71	(Portugal) Ricardo Moura		(Portugal) Ricardo Moura	(Portugal) António Costa	Škoda Fabia S2000	M
72	(Argentina) Juan Carlos Alonso	WRC-2	(Argentina) Juan Carlos Alonso	(Argentina) Juan Pablo Monasterolo	Mitsubishi Lancer Evo X	D
84	Sirbb Kuwait	WRC-2	(Kuwait) Salah Bin Eidan	(Italy) Alex Gelsomino	Ford Fiesta R5	M

Icon	Class
WRC	WRC entries eligible to score manufacturer points
WRC	Major entry ineligible to score manufacturer points
WRC-2	Registered to take part in WRC-2 championship
WRC-3	Registered to take part in WRC-3 championship

== Report ==
=== Before the rally ===
The rally was preceded by the "Fafe Rally Sprint", a single-stage exhibition event run over the famous Fafe stages in the country's north which was won by Volkswagen driver Sebastien Ogier.

=== During the rally ===
WRC leader Sébastien Ogier was the first on the road in the first leg, but his disadvantage was decreased since in the days before the rally it rained, and the Algarve roads were a combination of dry and a little moist tracks, which led to difficulties for drivers to choose the right tire compound. Sébastien Ogier led the rally since Lisbon SSS until the last stage of the first leg (SS7), finishing behind Mikko Hirvonen (1st) and Ott Tänak. In the middle Dani Sordo was in the lead after winning SS2 and SS3 with his Hyundai i20 WRC. In the 2nd leg Sébastien Ogier imposed a demonic pace retaking the lead and quickly pulled away from a powerless Mikko Hirvonen. Mads Østberg finished in the podium last place. Dani Sordo after a promising start, retired at the beginning of the last day (due to mechanical when he was heading do start SS14) when he was in overall fourth place. This rally was marked by the high number of crashes between the top drivers: Jari-Matti Latvala, Kris Meeke, Elfyn Evans and Robert Kubica (who would crash again in 2nd leg).

== Results ==
=== Event standings ===
Pos.	No.	Driver	Co-driver	Team	Car	Class	Time	Difference	Points
Overall classification
1	1	(France) Sébastien Ogier	(France) Julien Ingrassia	(Germany) Volkswagen Motorsport	Volkswagen Polo R WRC	WRC	3:33:20.4	0.00	28
2	5	(Finland) Mikko Hirvonen	(Finland) Jarmo Lehtinen	(United Kingdom) M-Sport WRT	Ford Fiesta RS WRC	WRC	3:34:03.6	+43.2	18
3	4	(Norway) Mads Østberg	(Sweden) Jonas Andersson	(France) Citroën Total Abu Dhabi WRT	Citroën DS3 WRC	WRC	3:34:32.8	+1:12.4	16
4	9	(Norway) Andreas Mikkelsen	(Finland) Mikko Markkula	(Germany) Volkswagen Motorsport II	Volkswagen Polo R WRC	WRC	3:38:10.9	+4:50.5	12
5	16	(Norway) Henning Solberg	(Austria) Ilka Minor	(Norway) Henning Solberg	Ford Fiesta RS WRC	WRC	3:38:30.6	+5:10.2	10
6	21	(Czech Republic) Martin Prokop	(Czech Republic) Jan Tománek	(Czech Republic) Jipocar Czech National Team	Ford Fiesta RS WRC	WRC	3:41:47.6	+8:27.2	8
7	7	(Belgium) Thierry Neuville	(Belgium) Nicolas Gilsoul	(Germany) Hyundai Shell World Rally Team	Hyundai i20 WRC	WRC	3:41:52.7	+8:32.3	6
8	8	(Finland) Juho Hänninen	(Finland) Tomi Tuominen	(Germany) Hyundai Shell World Rally Team	Hyundai i20 WRC	WRC	3:42:12.0	+8:51.6	4
9	40	(Qatar) Nasser Al-Attiyah	(Italy) Giovanni Bernacchini	(Qatar) Nasser Al-Attiyah	Ford Fiesta RRC	WRC-2	3:43:35.1	+10:14.7	2
10	35	(Finland) Jari Ketomaa	(Finland) Kaj Lindström	(United Kingdom) Drive DMACK	Ford Fiesta R5	WRC-2	3:43:46.7	+10:26.3	1

=== Special stages ===
Day	Stage	Name	Length	Winner	Car	Time	Rally leader
Leg 1 (3 Apr)	SS1	SSS Lisboa	3.27 km	(France) Sébastien Ogier	Volkswagen Polo R WRC	2:52.7	(France) Sébastien Ogier
Leg 1 (4 Apr)	SS2	Silves 1	21.52 km	(Spain) Dani Sordo	Hyundai i20 WRC	12:25.5	(France) Sébastien Ogier
Leg 1 (4 Apr)	SS3	Ourique 1	20.70 km	(Spain) Dani Sordo	Hyundai i20 WRC	12:20.8	(Spain) Dani Sordo
Leg 1 (4 Apr)	SS4	Almodôvar 1	26.48 km	(Finland) Jari-Matti Latvala	Volkswagen Polo R WRC	16:31.8	(France) Sébastien Ogier
Leg 1 (4 Apr)	SS5	Silves 2	21.50 km	(France) Sébastien Ogier	Volkswagen Polo R WRC	11:53.8	(France) Sébastien Ogier
Leg 1 (4 Apr)	SS6	Ourique 2	20.70 km	(Belgium) Thierry Neuville	Hyundai i20 WRC	12:10.4	(France) Sébastien Ogier
Leg 1 (4 Apr)	SS7	Almodôvar 2	26.48 km	(Finland) Mikko Hirvonen	Ford Fiesta RS WRC	16:27.6	(Finland) Mikko Hirvonen
Leg 2 (5 Apr)	SS8	Santa Clara 1	19.09 km	(France) Sébastien Ogier	Volkswagen Polo R WRC	12:23.0	(Finland) Mikko Hirvonen
Leg 2 (5 Apr)	SS9	Santana da Serra 1	31.90 km	(France) Sébastien Ogier	Volkswagen Polo R WRC	23:10.2	(France) Sébastien Ogier
Leg 2 (5 Apr)	SS10	Malhão 1	22.15 km	(Finland) Jari-Matti Latvala	Volkswagen Polo R WRC	13:58.1	(France) Sébastien Ogier
Leg 2 (5 Apr)	SS11	Santa Clara 2	19.09 km	(France) Sébastien Ogier	Volkswagen Polo R WRC	12:04.7	(France) Sébastien Ogier
Leg 2 (5 Apr)	SS12	Santana da Serra 2	31.90 km	(France) Sébastien Ogier	Volkswagen Polo R WRC	23:00.6	(France) Sébastien Ogier
Leg 2 (5 Apr)	SS13	Malhão 2	22.15 km	(France) Sébastien Ogier	Volkswagen Polo R WRC	13:49.2	(France) Sébastien Ogier
Leg 3 (6 Apr)	SS14	Loulé 1	13.83 km	(Finland) Jari-Matti Latvala	Volkswagen Polo R WRC	8:57.8	(France) Sébastien Ogier
Leg 3 (6 Apr)	SS15	S. Brás de Alportel 1	16.21 km	(Norway) Mads Østberg	Citroën DS3 WRC	11:38.7	(France) Sébastien Ogier
Leg 3 (6 Apr)	SS16	Loulé 2 (Power Stage)	13.83 km	(France) Sébastien Ogier	Volkswagen Polo R WRC	8:41.7	(France) Sébastien Ogier

=== Power Stage ===
The "Power stage" was a 13.83 km (8.59 mi) stage at the end of the rally.

Pos	Driver	Car	Time	Diff.	Pts
1	(France) Sébastien Ogier	Volkswagen Polo R WRC	8:41.7	0.0	3
2	(Finland) Jari-Matti Latvala	Volkswagen Polo R WRC	8:45.0	+3.3	2
3	(Norway) Mads Østberg	Citroën DS3 WRC	8:46.0	+4.3	1

== Standings after the rally ==
=== WRC ===
Drivers' Championship standings

Pos.	Driver	Points
1	(France) Sebastien Ogier	91
2	(Finland) Jari-Matti Latvala	62
3	(Norway) Mads Ostberg	48
4	(Norway) Andreas Mikkelsen	36
5	(Finland) Mikko Hirvonen	36

Manufacturers' Championship standings

Pos.	Manufacturer	Points
1	(Germany) Volkswagen Motorsport	144
2	(France) Citroën World Rally Team	75
3	(United Kingdom) M-Sport World Rally Team	60
4	(Germany) Hyundai World Rally Team	45
5	(Germany) Volkswagen Motorsport II	40

=== Other ===
WRC2 Drivers' Championship standings

Pos.	Driver	Points
1	(Ukraine) Yuriy Protasov	60
2	(Italy) Lorenzo Bertelli	44
3	(Estonia) Karl Kruuda	37
4	(Finland) Jari Ketomaa	36
5	(Qatar) Nasser Al-Attiyah	25

WRC3 Drivers' Championship standings

Pos.	Driver	Points
1	(France) Quentin Gilbert	25
2	(France) Stéphane Lefebvre	25
3	(Germany) Christian Riedemann	18
4	(Slovakia) Martin Koči	15
5	(Switzerland) Federico della Casa	12

Junior WRC Drivers' Championship standings

Pos.	Driver	Points
1	(France) Stéphane Lefebvre	25
2	(Germany) Christian Riedemann	18
3	(Slovakia) Martin Koči	15
4	(Switzerland) Federico della Casa	12
5	(Italy) Simone Campedelli	10
