= Faleyras =

- Commune
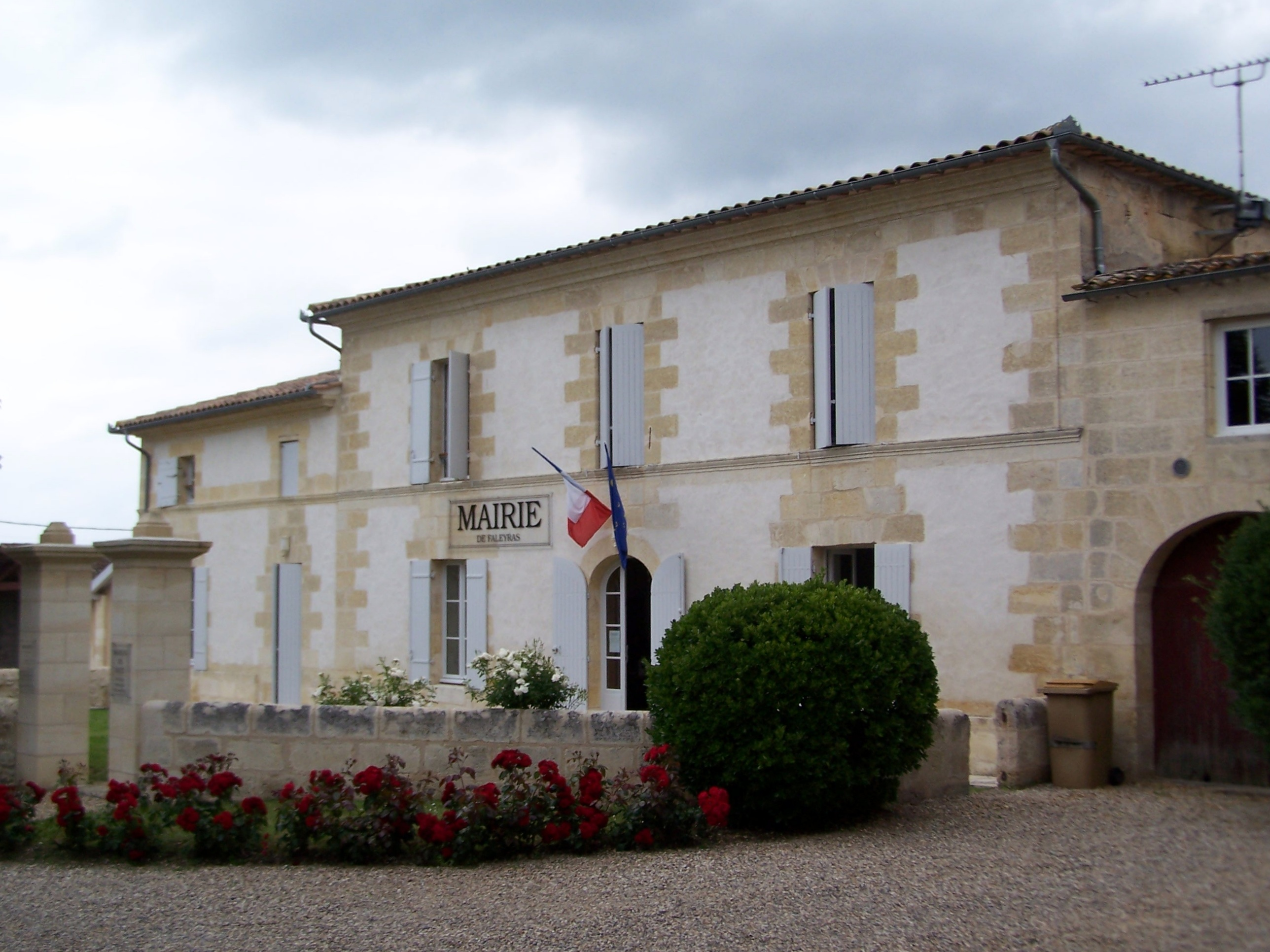
- Town hall
- Location of Faleyras
- Location within France Location within Nouvelle-Aquitaine
- Coordinates: 44°46′20″N 0°13′33″W
- Country: France
- Region: Nouvelle-Aquitaine
- Department: Gironde
- Arrondissement: Langon
- Canton: L'Entre-Deux-Mers
- Intercommunality: CC rurales de l'Entre-Deux-Mers

Government
  - Mayor (2020–2026): Lionel Solans
- Area^{1}: 10.44 km^{2} (4.03 sq mi)
- Elevation: 76 m (249 ft)
- Highest elevation: 102 m (335 ft)
- Lowest elevation: 26 m (85 ft)
- Population (2023): 430
  - Density: 41/km^{2} (110/sq mi)
- Time zone: UTC+01:00 (CET)
  - Summer (DST): UTC+02:00 (CEST)
- INSEE/Postal code: 33163 /33760
- ^{1} French Land Register data, which excludes lakes, ponds, glaciers > 1 km^{2} (0.386 sq mi or 247 acres) and river estuaries.

Faleyras is a commune in the Gironde department in Nouvelle-Aquitaine in southwestern France.

== Population ==
Historical population
Year	Pop.	±% p.a.
1968	285	—
1975	280	−0.25%
1982	289	+0.45%
1990	299	+0.43%
1999	309	+0.37%
2007	389	+2.92%
2012	390	+0.05%
2017	424	+1.69%
2023	430	+0.23%
Source: INSEE

== See also ==
- Communes of the Gironde department
